= List of women's football clubs in South Korea =

This is a list of South Korean women's football clubs, as of the 2026 season.

== WK League ==
- Gangjin Swans
- Gyeongju KHNP
- Hwacheon KSPO
- Incheon Hyundai Steel Red Angels
- Mungyeong Sangmu
- Sejong Sportstoto
- Seoul City Amazones
- Suwon FC Women

== Former clubs ==
- Bucheon FMC Best
- Chungnam Ilhwa Chunma
- Icheon Daekyo
- Soongmin Wonders

== See also ==
- WK League
- Women's football in South Korea
- Korea Women's Football Federation
- List of women's association football clubs
- List of football clubs in South Korea
