= Cho So-hyun =

South Korean footballer (born 1988)

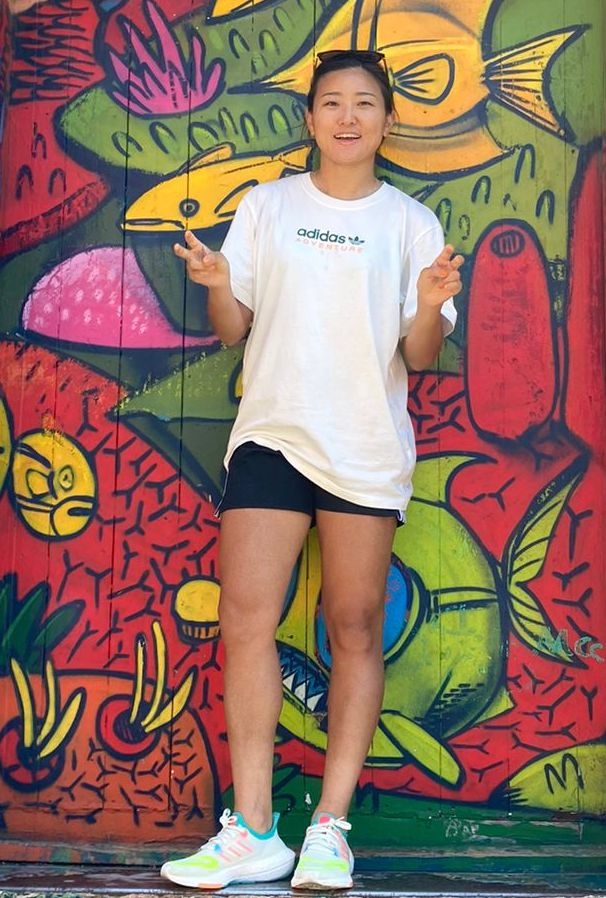
- Cho in 2022

Personal information
- Date of birth: 24 June 1988 (age 38)
- Place of birth: Seoul, South Korea
- Height: 1.67 m (5 ft 6 in)
- Position: Midfielder

Team information
- Current team: Halifax Tides FC
- Number: 8

Youth career
- Yeojoo Institute of Technology

Senior career*
Years	Team	Apps	(Gls)
2009–2010	Suwon FMC		
2011–2017	Hyundai Steel Red Angels		
2016	→ INAC Kobe Leonessa (loan)	17	(0)
2018	Avaldsnes IL	20	(0)
2019–2021	West Ham United	24	(0)
2021	→ Tottenham Hotspur (loan)	7	(0)
2021–2023	Tottenham Hotspur	21	(0)
2023–2025	Birmingham City	24	(3)
2025	Suwon FC		
2026–	Halifax Tides FC	25	(1)

International career
2005	South Korea U17	5	(1)
2005–2007	South Korea U20	6	(0)
2007–2009	South Korea Universiade	10	(2)
2007–2024	South Korea	156	(26)
Medal record
Summer Universiade
Gold medal – first place	2009 Belgrade	Team
Asian Games
Bronze medal – third place	2014 Incheon	Team
- * Club domestic league appearances and goals as of 11 November 2026

- Cho So-hyun
- Hangul: 조소현
- Hanja: 趙昭賢
- RR: Jo Sohyeon
- MR: Cho Sohyŏn

Cho So-hyun (Korean: 조소현, Korean pronunciation: [tɕo.so.ɦjʌn]; born 24 June 1988) is a South Korean professional footballer who plays as a midfielder for Northern Super League club Halifax Tides FC. She is widely regarded as one of South Korea's best players, and is their second most-capped international player with 156 appearances. She has won multiple domestic league titles and was named Korean Women's Player of the Year in 2015.

== Club career ==
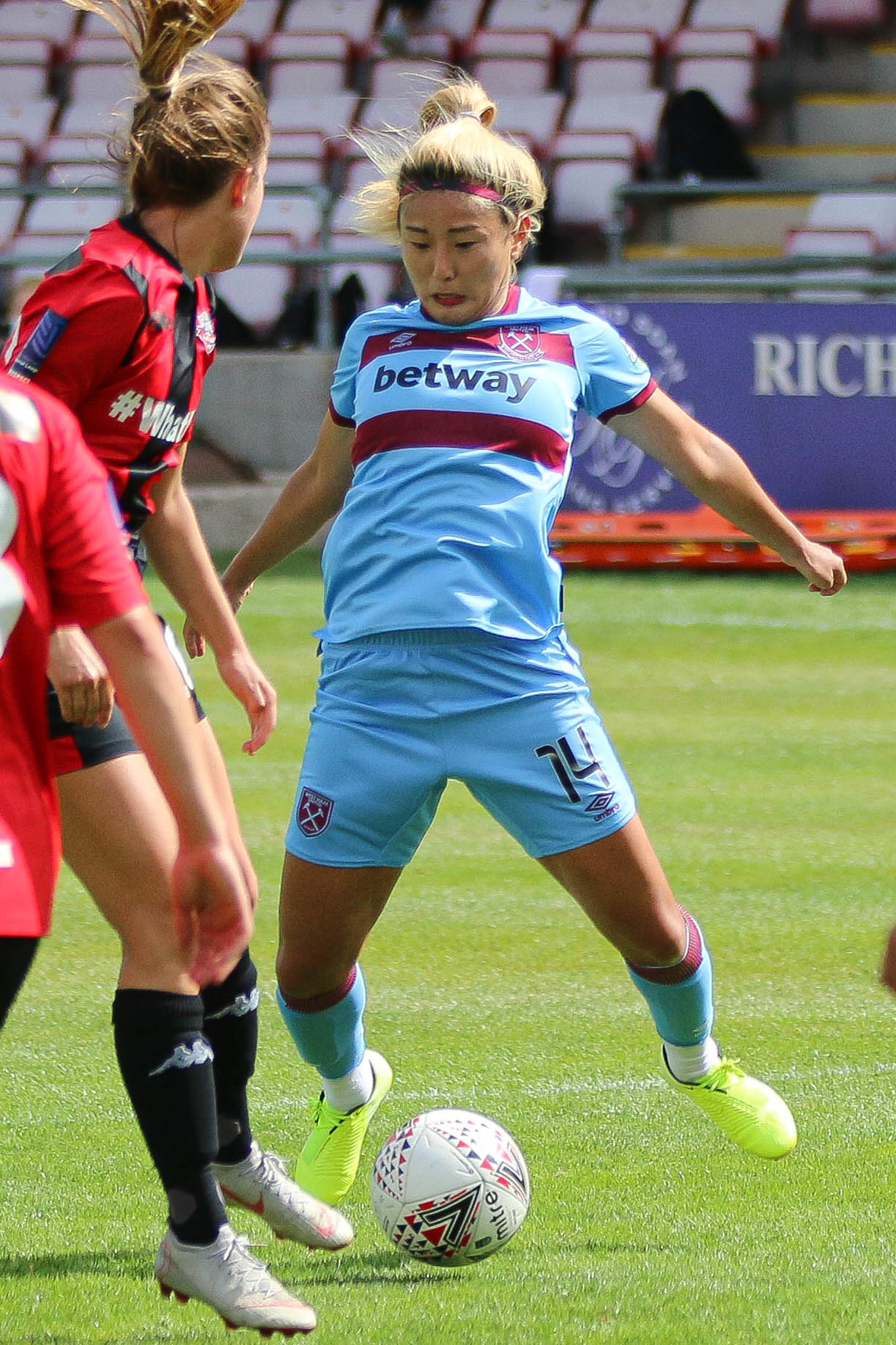
Cho playing for West Ham United in 2020

=== Suwon FMC ===
Cho was the first pick in the 2009 WK League draft, signing for newly established team Suwon Facilities Management Corporation WFC.

=== Hyundai Steel Red Angels ===
On 20 November 2017, Cho scored twice in a 3–0 win over Hwacheon KSPO in the second leg of the WK League final. She finished the 2017 season with three goals and two assists in 27 appearances and won her fourth league title.

=== Loan to INAC Kobe Leonessa ===
On 29 January 2016, Cho joined INAC Kobe Leonessa on loan and was given the number 16 shirt. On 26 March, she made her debut in a 3–1 win over Konomiya Speranza Osaka-Takatsuki. On 11 June, she scored twice in a 6–0 away victory against Konomiya Speranza Osaka-Takatsuki in the Nadeshiko League Cup. On 25 December, she converted a penalty in INAC Kobe Leonessa's penalty shootout win over Albirex Niigata in the 2016 Empress's Cup final, helping the club to its sixth Empress's Cup title. Cho finished the season with two goals in 27 appearances in all competitions. On 12 January 2017, it was announced that Cho had returned to Hyundai Steel Red Angels.

=== Avaldsnes IL ===
On 7 February 2018, Cho signed a one-year contract with Avaldsnes IL, becoming the first South Korean female footballer to play in Norway. On 22 April 2018, she made her debut in a 3–0 loss to Vålerenga. With Cho, Avaldsnes IL reached the round of 32 in the 2017–18 UEFA Women's Champions League.

=== West Ham United ===
In December 2018, South Korean media reported that Cho had signed for West Ham United of the English FA Women's Super League. Cho So-hyun was officially announced as a West Ham player on 13 January 2019 via the club website where she was quoted as saying "It's always been my ambition to play in England, so this is a very exciting time for me. It's a big league, and to be signing for a big club like West Ham with all the history, makes it even more special." Cho made her debut on the same day coming on as a second-half substitute against title challengers Manchester City.

In February 2019, Cho provided both assists for Alisha Lehmann as West Ham beat Reading 2–1.

Cho made her Women's FA Cup debut on 3 February 2019 in a 3–1 home victory over Blackburn Rovers. On 14 April 2019 West Ham reached their first FA Cup final by defeating Reading after a penalty shoot-out. With the scoreline deadlocked at 1–1, Cho scored the decisive penalty to send West Ham to Wembley.

On 6 July 2020, Cho signed a new two-year contract with West Ham.

=== Tottenham Hotspur ===
On 28 January 2021, Cho joined the FA WSL side Tottenham Hotspur on loan for the remainder of the 2020–21 season, with an option to make the loan permanent. With her men's counterpart Son Heung-min already at the club, it gave Spurs the rare distinction of having both the men's and women's South Korean national team captains at one club.

Spurs announced Cho had officially signed for the club on 2 July 2021. She scored her first goal for Spurs and her first ever goal in England on 17 November 2021 in their League Cup tie against Watford.

=== Birmingham City ===
On 14 September 2023, Cho joined Women's Championship club Birmingham City, signing a one-year contract with an option for another season. In March 2024, the club announced that Cho had signed a one-year contract extension.

=== Return to Suwon ===
In July 2025, Cho signed a contract with Suwon FC Women (formerly known as Suwon FMC) and returned to the club where her footballing career began.

=== Halifax Tides ===
On 11 February 2026, Cho signed for Canadian Northern Super League side Halifax Tides FC ahead of the 2026 season.

== International career ==
Cho captained South Korea at the 2015 FIFA Women's World Cup in Canada. In their final group match Cho scored a vital equaliser against Spain. They would go on to win the match and finish second in their group which saw them qualify for the knockout stages. It was the first time South Korea had progressed to the round of 16. In 2015, she was named the KFA Footballer of the Year. In April 2018 Cho scored twice against the Philippines at the 2018 AFC Women's Asian Cup, a win which saw South Korea qualify for the 2019 FIFA Women's World Cup. On 17 May 2019, Cho was officially announced in the 2019 World Cup squad and would again captain the team. Despite South Korea losing their second group stage match to Nigeria, Cho was statistically the best player on the pitch according to football analytics site Twelve Football. In September 2021 Cho scored twice in a 12–0 victory over Mongolia in the Asian Cup qualifiers.

On 30 January 2022, Cho made her 137th appearance for South Korea in a 1–0 victory over Australia at the 2022 AFC Women's Asian Cup and became the most capped South Korean footballer in the country's history.

Cho scored her 23rd international goal on 3 February 2022, the opener in a 2–0 win over the Philippines. That victory saw South Korea reach the final of the AFC Women's Asian Cup for the first time in history.

At the 2023 FIFA Women's World Cup, Cho notably scored South Korea's only goal of the tournament in a 1–1 draw with Germany. While South Korea were thus knocked out of the tournament in the group stage, the result meant that Germany, the second-ranked team in the world, was also eliminated, which was described as one of the biggest upsets in the history of the Women's World Cup.

== Personal life ==
In an interview with British journalist Drew Diamond, Cho revealed that amongst her many ambitions in life is to become a general manager of a women's football club in her native South Korea.

Alongside fellow South Korean footballer Son Heung-min, Cho was an ambassador for AIA Group where she promoted healthy living. Like Son, Cho also has a sponsorship deal with sportswear and equipment supplier Adidas.

== Career statistics ==
=== Club ===
As of 21 September 2024

Appearances and goals by club, season and competition
Club	Season	League			National cup		League cup		Total	
Club	Season	Division	Apps	Goals	Apps	Goals	Apps	Goals	Apps	Goals
West Ham United	2018–19	Women's Super League	7	0	5	0	0	0	12	0
West Ham United	2019–20	Women's Super League	8	0	0	0	3	0	11	0
West Ham United	2020–21	Women's Super League	9	0	0	0	2	0	11	0
West Ham United	Total		24	0	5	0	5	0	34	0
Tottenham Hotspur (loan)	2020–21	Women's Super League	7	0	2	0	0	0	9	0
Tottenham Hotspur	2021–22	Women's Super League	12	0	0	0	2	1	14	1
Tottenham Hotspur	2022–23	Women's Super League	9	0	0	0	3	0	12	0
Tottenham Hotspur	Total		28	0	2	0	5	1	35	1
Birmingham City	2023–24	Women's Championship	9	1	2	0	2	0	13	1
Birmingham City	2024–25	Women's Championship	1	0	0	0	0	0	1	0
Birmingham City	Total		10	1	2	0	2	0	14	1
Career total			62	1	9	0	12	1	83	2

=== International ===
Scores and results list South Korea's goal tally first, score column indicates score after each Cho goal.

List of international goals scored by Cho So-hyun
No.	Date	Venue	Opponent	Score	Result	Competition
1	24 August 2009	Tainan County Stadium, Tainan County, Taiwan	Guam	9–0	9–0	2010 EAFF Women's Football Championship
2	26 August 2009	Tainan County Stadium, Tainan County, Taiwan	Northern Mariana Islands	14–0	19–0	2010 EAFF Women's Football Championship
3	15 June 2013	Gillette Stadium, Foxborough, Massachusetts, United States	United States	1–2	1–4	Friendly
4	15 May 2015	Thống Nhất Stadium, Vietnam	Myanmar	6–0	12–0	2014 AFC Women's Asian Cup
5	15 May 2015	Thống Nhất Stadium, Vietnam	Myanmar	8–0	12–0	2014 AFC Women's Asian Cup
6	15 May 2015	Thống Nhất Stadium, Vietnam	Myanmar	12–0	12–0	2014 AFC Women's Asian Cup
7	21 September 2014	Munhak Stadium, Incheon, South Korea	Maldives	12–0	13–0	2014 Asian Games
8	18 June 2015	Daejeon World Cup Stadium, Daejeon, South Korea	Russia	1–0	2–0	Friendly
9	18 June 2015	TD Place Stadium, Ottawa, Canada	Spain	1–1	2–1	2015 FIFA Women's World Cup
10	4 August 2015	Wuhan Sports Center Stadium, Wuhan, China	Japan	1–1	2–1	2015 EAFF Women's East Asian Cup
11	8 November 2016	Hong Kong Football Club Stadium, Hong Kong	Guam	13–0	13–0	2017 EAFF E-1 Football Championship preliminary
12	14 November 2016	Hong Kong Football Club Stadium, Hong Kong	Chinese Taipei	9–0	9–0	2017 EAFF E-1 Football Championship preliminary
13	3 March 2017	GSP Stadium, Strovolos, Cyprus	Scotland	2–0	2–0	2017 Cyprus Women's Cup
14	9 April 2017	Kim Il-sung Stadium, Pyongyang, North Korea	Hong Kong	1–0	6–0	2018 AFC Women's Asian Cup qualification
15	9 April 2017	Kim Il-sung Stadium, Pyongyang, North Korea	Hong Kong	3–0	6–0	2018 AFC Women's Asian Cup qualification
16	11 April 2017	Kim Il-sung Stadium, Pyongyang, North Korea	Uzbekistan	4–0	4–0	2018 AFC Women's Asian Cup qualification
17	8 December 2017	Fukuda Denshi Arena, Chiba, Japan	Japan	1–1	2–3	2017 EAFF E-1 Football Championship
18	13 April 2018	King Abdullah II Stadium, Amman, Jordan	Vietnam	1–0	4–0	2018 AFC Women's Asian Cup
19	16 April 2018	Amman International Stadium, Amman, Jordan	Philippines	4–0	5–0	2018 AFC Women's Asian Cup
20	16 April 2018	Amman International Stadium, Amman, Jordan	Philippines	5–0	5–0	2018 AFC Women's Asian Cup
21	17 September 2021	Pakhtakor Stadium, Tashkent, Uzbekistan	Mongolia	2–0	12–0	2022 AFC Women's Asian Cup qualification
22	17 September 2021	Pakhtakor Stadium, Tashkent, Uzbekistan	Mongolia	7–0	12–0	2022 AFC Women's Asian Cup qualification
23	3 February 2022	Shree Shiv Chhatrapati Sports Complex, Pune, India	Philippines	1–0	2–0	2022 AFC Women's Asian Cup
24	7 April 2023	Suwon World Cup Stadium, Suwon, South Korea	Zambia	1–0	5–2	Friendly
25	7 April 2023	Suwon World Cup Stadium, Suwon, South Korea	Zambia	4–2	5–2	Friendly
26	3 August 2023	Lang Park, Brisbane, Australia	Germany	1–0	1–1	2023 FIFA Women's World Cup

== Honours ==
Suwon FMC

- WK League: 2010

Incheon Hyundai Steel Red Angels

- WK League: 2013, 2014, 2015, 2017

INAC Kobe Leonessa

- Empress's Cup: 2016

West Ham United

- Women's FA Cup Finalist: 2018–19

South Korea

- Summer Universiade Gold medal: 2009
- Asian Games Bronze medal: 2014
- Four Nations Tournament runner-up: 2019
- AFC Women's Asian Cup runner-up: 2022

Individual

- KFA Footballer of the Year: 2015
