= 2009 in South Korean football =

Football in South Korea
- Season: 2009

Men's football
- K League: Jeonbuk Hyundai Motors
- National League: Gangneung City
- K3 League: Pocheon Citizen
- Korean FA Cup: Suwon Samsung Bluewings
- Korean League Cup: Pohang Steelers

Women's football
- WK League: Daekyo Kangaroos

This article shows a summary of the 2009 football season in South Korea.

== National teams ==
=== FIFA World Cup qualification ===
11 February AFC fourth round, Group B	Iran	1–1	South Korea	Tehran, Iran
	Nekounam 58'		Park Ji-sung 81'

1 April AFC fourth round, Group B	South Korea	1–0	North Korea	Seoul, South Korea
	Kim Chi-woo 87'

6 June AFC fourth round, Group B	United Arab Emirates	0–2	South Korea	Dubai, United Arab Emirates
			Park Chu-young 9'; Ki Sung-yueng 39'

10 June AFC fourth round, Group B	South Korea	0–0	Saudi Arabia	Seoul, South Korea

17 June AFC fourth round, Group B	South Korea	1–1	Iran	Seoul, South Korea
	Park Ji-sung 81'		Shojaei 51'

AFC fourth round, Group B table
Pos	Team	Pld	W	D	L	GF	GA	GD	Pts	Qualification
1	South Korea	8	4	4	0	12	4	+8	16	Qualification for World Cup
2	North Korea	8	3	3	2	7	5	+2	12	Qualification for World Cup
3	Saudi Arabia	8	3	3	2	8	8	0	12	Advance to AFC fifth round
4	Iran	8	2	5	1	8	7	+1	11	
5	United Arab Emirates	8	0	1	7	6	17	−11	1	

=== Friendlies ===
==== Senior team ====
1 February	South Korea	1–1	Syria	Dubai, United Arab Emirates
	Al Aitoni 80' (o.g.)		Al-Rashed 90'

4 February	South Korea	2–2	Bahrain	Dubai, United Arab Emirates
	Kim Jung-woo 79'; Lee Keun-ho 90+3'		Aaish 63' (pen.); Abdulrahman 82'

28 March	South Korea	2–1	Iraq	Suwon, South Korea
	Kim Chi-woo 57'; Lee Keun-ho 70' (pen.)		Hwang Jae-won 52' (o.g.)

2 June	South Korea	0–0 (Note: The friendly match against Oman was not regarded as an official match organized by FIFA because South Korea used seven substitutes in the match. Under the FIFA regulations, a maximum of six substitutes may be used in an official national team match.)	Oman	Dubai, United Arab Emirates

12 August	South Korea	1–0	Paraguay	Seoul, South Korea
	Park Chu-young 83'

5 September	South Korea	3–1	Australia	Seoul, South Korea
	Park Chu-young 4'; Lee Jung-soo 20'; Seol Ki-hyeon 86'		Kisnorbo 33'

14 October	South Korea	2–0	Senegal	Seoul, South Korea
	Ki Sung-yueng 42'; Oh Beom-seok 80'

14 November	Denmark	0–0	South Korea	Esbjerg, Denmark

18 November	South Korea	0–1	Serbia	London, England
			Žigić 7'

==== Under-23 team ====
19 December Friendly	South Korea	1–2	Japan U20	Changwon, South Korea
15:00 KST (UTC+09)	Cho Young-cheol 36'	Report	Yamada 77', 88'	Stadium: Changwon Football Center; Attendance: 13,277; Referee: Huang Junjie (China PR)

== Leagues ==
=== K League ===
==== Regular season ====
Pos	Team	Pld	W	D	L	GF	GA	GD	Pts	Qualification
1	Jeonbuk Hyundai Motors	28	17	6	5	59	33	+26	57	Qualification for playoffs final
2	Pohang Steelers	28	14	11	3	55	33	+22	53	Qualification for playoffs semi-final
3	FC Seoul	28	16	5	7	47	27	+20	53	Qualification for playoffs first round
4	Seongnam Ilhwa Chunma	28	13	6	9	40	34	+6	45	Qualification for playoffs first round
5	Incheon United	28	11	10	7	31	29	+2	43	Qualification for playoffs first round
6	Jeonnam Dragons	28	11	9	8	41	39	+2	42	Qualification for playoffs first round
7	Gyeongnam FC	28	10	10	8	38	32	+6	40	
8	Ulsan Hyundai	28	9	9	10	32	29	+3	36	
9	Daejeon Citizen	28	8	9	11	29	38	−9	33	
10	Suwon Samsung Bluewings	28	8	8	12	29	32	−3	32	Qualification for Champions League (Note: Qualified as champions of FA Cup.)
11	Gwangju Sangmu	28	9	3	16	33	40	−7	30	
12	Busan IPark	28	7	8	13	36	42	−6	29	
13	Gangwon FC	28	7	7	14	42	57	−15	28	
14	Jeju United	28	7	7	14	22	44	−22	28	
15	Daegu FC	28	5	8	15	20	45	−25	23	

Source: K League (in Korean)
Rules for classification: 1) Points; 2) Goal difference; 3) Goals scored

==== Championship playoffs ====
First round
3	FC Seoul	1 (2)
6	Jeonnam Dragons (p)	1 (3)
4	Seongnam Ilhwa Chunma (p)	1 (3)
5	Incheon United	1 (2)

Second round
Seongnam Ilhwa Chunma	1
Jeonnam Dragons	0

Semifinal
2	Pohang Steelers	0
Seongnam Ilhwa Chunma	1

Final
1	Jeonbuk Hyundai Motors	0	3	3
Seongnam Ilhwa Chunma	0	1	1

==== Final table ====
Pos	Team	Qualification
1	Jeonbuk Hyundai Motors (C)	Qualification for the Champions League
2	Seongnam Ilhwa Chunma	Qualification for the Champions League
3	Pohang Steelers	Qualification for the Champions League
4	Jeonnam Dragons	
5	FC Seoul	
6	Incheon United	

Source: RSSSF
(C) Champions

=== Korea National League ===
==== Regular season ====
Pos	Team	Pld	W	D	L	GF	GA	GD	Pts	Qualification
1	Changwon City	25	14	8	3	44	28	+16	50	Second stage winners
2	Suwon City	25	12	10	3	46	23	+23	46	Qualification for playoffs
3	Gangneung City (C)	25	13	7	5	41	30	+11	46	Qualification for playoffs
4	Gimhae City	25	12	6	7	45	37	+8	42	First stage winners
5	Incheon Korail	25	11	6	8	31	28	+3	39	
6	Ansan Hallelujah	25	10	7	8	30	24	+6	37	
7	Hyundai Mipo Dockyard	25	10	6	9	39	31	+8	36	
8	Busan Transportation Corporation	25	11	3	11	42	35	+7	36	
9	Goyang KB Kookmin Bank	25	9	8	8	35	31	+4	35	
10	Cheonan City	25	8	4	13	29	31	−2	28	
11	Daejeon KHNP	25	6	10	9	35	41	−6	28	
12	Nowon Hummel Korea	25	6	4	15	28	42	−14	22	
13	Yesan FC	25	3	5	17	24	63	−39	14	
14	Hongcheon Idu	13	1	2	10	11	36	−25	5	Withdrawal (Note: Withdrew due to financial problem.)

Source: Korea National League (in Korean)
Rules for classification: 1) Points; 2) Goal difference; 3) Goals scored
(C) Champions

==== Championship playoffs ====
Semi-finals
Gimhae City	2
Suwon City	1
Changwon City	1
Gangneung City	3

Final
Gimhae City	0	2	2
Gangneung City	1	3	4

=== K3 League ===
Pos	Team	Pld	W	D	L	GF	GA	GD	Pts	Qualification
1	Pocheon Citizen (C)	32	19	10	3	79	29	+50	67	Qualification for FA Cup second round
2	Gwangju Gwangsan	32	20	4	8	65	25	+40	64	Qualification for FA Cup first round
3	Yongin Citizen	32	18	6	8	76	39	+37	60	Qualification for FA Cup first round
4	Bucheon FC 1995	32	17	9	6	62	37	+25	60	Qualification for FA Cup first round
5	Icheon Citizen	32	16	10	6	70	35	+35	58	Qualification for FA Cup first round
6	Cheonan FC	32	17	6	9	63	38	+25	57	Qualification for FA Cup first round
7	Namyangju United	32	17	5	10	79	48	+31	56	Qualification for FA Cup first round
8	Cheongju Jikji	32	15	6	11	61	47	+14	51	Qualification for FA Cup first round
9	Gyeongju Citizen	32	13	9	10	74	32	+42	48	Qualification for FA Cup first round
10	Yangju Citizen	32	14	6	12	60	45	+15	48	
11	Jeonju FC	32	13	6	13	59	42	+17	45	
12	Samcheok Shinwoo Electronics	32	13	5	14	73	49	+24	44	
13	Seoul United	32	11	7	14	70	56	+14	40	
14	Jeonju Ongoeul	32	11	7	14	54	58	−4	40	
15	Goyang Citizen	32	5	1	26	29	125	−96	16	
16	Asan United	32	1	3	28	28	121	−93	6	
17	Seoul FC Martyrs	32	2	0	30	18	194	−176	6	

Source: Soccerway KFA
Rules for classification: 1) Points; 2) Goal difference; 3) Goals scored
(C) Champions

=== WK League ===
==== Regular season ====
Pos	Team	Pld	W	D	L	GF	GA	GD	Pts	Qualification
1	Daekyo Kangaroos (C)	20	15	3	2	38	13	+25	48	Qualification for Championship
2	Incheon Hyundai Steel Red Angels	20	9	8	3	25	7	+18	35	Qualification for Championship
3	Seoul City Amazones	20	8	5	7	27	25	+2	29	
4	Chungnam Ilhwa Chunma	20	3	9	8	18	24	−6	18	
5	Busan Sangmu	20	4	6	10	21	39	−18	18	
6	Suwon FMC	20	4	3	13	15	36	−21	15	

Source: WK League (in Korean)
Rules for classification: 1) Points; 2) Goal difference; 3) Goals scored
(C) Champions

==== Championship playoff ====
Team 1	Agg.	Team 2	1st leg	2nd leg
Incheon Hyundai Steel Red Angels	0–2	Daekyo Kangaroos	0–1	0–1

== Domestic cups ==
=== Korean FA Cup ===
Round of 32
Gyeongnam FC	1
Ansan Hallelujah	0
Daegu FC	3
Suwon City	1
Daejeon Citizen	2
Cheonan City	0
Incheon United	0
Kyung Hee University	1
Seongnam Ilhwa Chunma	5
Busan Transportation Corporation	2
Sun Moon University	0 (2)
Chung-Ang University (p)	0 (4)
Ulsan Hyundai	1 (5)
Goyang KB Kookmin Bank (p)	1 (7)
Pohang Steelers	7
Hongcheon Idu	1
Busan IPark	2
Hyundai Mipo Dockyard	1
Suwon Samsung Bluewings	1
Nowon Hummel Korea	0
Jeonnam Dragons	2
Daejeon KHNP	1
Gangwon FC (p)	2 (4)
Incheon Korail	2 (3)
Jeju United (p)	0 (5)
Gangneung City	0 (3)
Yesan FC	0
Gwangju Sangmu	5
Jeonbuk Hyundai Motors	1
Changwon City	0
FC Seoul	2
Gimhae City	0

Round of 16
Gyeongnam FC	0 (4)
Daegu FC (p)	0 (5)
Daejeon Citizen	2
Kyung Hee University	1
Seongnam Ilhwa Chunma	1
Chung-Ang University	0
Goyang KB Kookmin Bank	0
Pohang Steelers	4
Busan IPark	0
Suwon Samsung Bluewings	1
Jeonnam Dragons	1
Gangwon FC	0
Jeju United (p)	1 (4)
Gwangju Sangmu	1 (3)
Jeonbuk Hyundai Motors	3
FC Seoul	1

Quarter-finals
Daegu FC	1 (3)
Daejeon Citizen (p)	1 (5)
Seongnam Ilhwa Chunma	2
Pohang Steelers	1
Suwon Samsung Bluewings	3
Jeonnam Dragons	0
Jeju United	2
Jeonbuk Hyundai Motors	5

Semi-finals
7 October – Daejeon
Daejeon Citizen	0
Seongnam Ilhwa Chunma	1
7 October – Suwon
Suwon Samsung Bluewings	3
Jeonbuk Hyundai Motors	0

Final
8 November – Seongnam
Seongnam Ilhwa Chunma	1 (2)
Suwon Samsung Bluewings (p)	1 (4)

=== Korean League Cup ===
==== Group stage ====
Group A
Pos	Team	Pld	Pts
1	Seongnam Ilhwa Chunma	5	11
2	Incheon United	5	8
3	Daegu FC	5	7
4	Jeonnam Dragons	5	7
5	Daejeon Citizen	5	6
6	Gangwon FC	5	3

Source: RSSSF

Group B
Pos	Team	Pld	Pts
1	Jeju United	4	10
2	Busan IPark	4	8
3	Jeonbuk Hyundai Motors	4	4
4	Gyeongnam FC	4	4
5	Gwangju Sangmu	4	1

Source: RSSSF

==== Knockout stage ====
Quarter-finals
B2	Busan IPark (p)	3	0	3 (5)
A1	Seongnam Ilhwa Chunma	2	1	3 (4)
B1	Jeju United	0	1	1
CL	Ulsan Hyundai	1	4	5
CL	FC Seoul (p)	0	1	1 (5)
A2	Incheon United	0	1	1 (3)
CL	Pohang Steelers	3	1	4
CL	Suwon Samsung Bluewings	0	0	0

Semi-finals
Busan IPark	2	1	3
Ulsan Hyundai	1	0	1
FC Seoul	2	2	4
Pohang Steelers	1	5	6

Final
Busan IPark	1	1	2
Pohang Steelers	1	5	6

=== Korea National League Championship ===
==== Group stage ====
Group A
Pos	Team	Pld	Pts
1	Busan Transportation Corporation	2	4
2	Hyundai Mipo Dockyard	2	4
3	Incheon Korail	2	0

Source: Reports

Group B
Pos	Team	Pld	Pts
1	Daejeon KHNP	3	7
2	Suwon City	3	6
3	Changwon City	3	4
4	Hongcheon Idu	3	0

Source: Reports

Group C
Pos	Team	Pld	Pts
1	Goyang KB Kookmin Bank	3	7
2	Gangneung City	3	5
3	Cheonan City	3	4
4	Yesan FC	3	0

Source: Reports

Group D
Pos	Team	Pld	Pts
1	Gimhae FC	3	7
2	Ansan Hallelujah	3	4
3	Gumi Siltron	3	3
4	Nowon Hummel Korea	3	1

Source: Reports

==== Knockout stage ====
Quarter-finals
Busan Transportation Corporation	2
Gangneung City	1
Daejeon KHNP	5
Ansan Hallelujah	1
Goyang KB Kookmin Bank	3
Hyundai Mipo Dockyard	2
Gimhae FC (p)	0 (5)
Suwon City	0 (3)

Semi-finals
Busan Transportation Corporation	0
Daejeon KHNP	2
Goyang KB Kookmin Bank	2
Gimhae FC	0

Final
Daejeon KHNP	1
Goyang KB Kookmin Bank	3

== International cups ==
=== AFC Champions League ===
Team	Result	Round	Aggregate	Score	Venue	Opponent
FC Seoul	Quarter-finals	Group F	Runners-up	4–2	Away	(Indonesia) Sriwijaya
FC Seoul	Quarter-finals	Group F	Runners-up	5–1	Home	(Indonesia) Sriwijaya
FC Seoul	Quarter-finals	Group F	Runners-up	2–4	Home	(Japan) Gamba Osaka
FC Seoul	Quarter-finals	Group F	Runners-up	2–1	Away	(Japan) Gamba Osaka
FC Seoul	Quarter-finals	Group F	Runners-up	0–2	Away	(China) Shandong Luneng
FC Seoul	Quarter-finals	Group F	Runners-up	1–1	Home	(China) Shandong Luneng
FC Seoul	Quarter-finals	Round of 16	2–2 (5–4 p)	2–2 (a.e.t.)	—	(Japan) Kashima Antlers
FC Seoul	Quarter-finals	Quarter-finals	3–4	2–3	Away	(Qatar) Umm-Salal
FC Seoul	Quarter-finals	Quarter-finals	3–4	1–1	Home	(Qatar) Umm-Salal
Pohang Steelers	Champions	Group H	Winners	0–0	Away	(Australia) Central Coast Mariners
Pohang Steelers	Champions	Group H	Winners	3–2	Home	(Australia) Central Coast Mariners
Pohang Steelers	Champions	Group H	Winners	1–1	Home	(Japan) Kawasaki Frontale
Pohang Steelers	Champions	Group H	Winners	2–0	Away	(Japan) Kawasaki Frontale
Pohang Steelers	Champions	Group H	Winners	1–0	Home	(China) Tianjin TEDA
Pohang Steelers	Champions	Group H	Winners	0–0	Away	(China) Tianjin TEDA
Pohang Steelers	Champions	Round of 16	6–0	6–0	—	(Australia) Newcastle Jets
Pohang Steelers	Champions	Quarter-finals	5–4	1–3	Away	(Uzbekistan) Bunyodkor
Pohang Steelers	Champions	Quarter-finals	5–4	4–1 (a.e.t.)	Home	(Uzbekistan) Bunyodkor
Pohang Steelers	Champions	Semi-finals	4–1	2–0	Home	(Qatar) Umm-Salal
Pohang Steelers	Champions	Semi-finals	4–1	2–1	Away	(Qatar) Umm-Salal
Pohang Steelers	Champions	Final	2–1	2–1	—	(Saudi Arabia) Al-Ittihad
Suwon Samsung Bluewings	Round of 16	Group G	Runners-up	4–1	Home	(Japan) Kashima Antlers
Suwon Samsung Bluewings	Round of 16	Group G	Runners-up	0–3	Away	(Japan) Kashima Antlers
Suwon Samsung Bluewings	Round of 16	Group G	Runners-up	2–0	Away	Singapore Armed Forces
Suwon Samsung Bluewings	Round of 16	Group G	Runners-up	3–1	Home	Singapore Armed Forces
Suwon Samsung Bluewings	Round of 16	Group G	Runners-up	1–2	Away	(China) Shanghai Shenhua
Suwon Samsung Bluewings	Round of 16	Group G	Runners-up	2–1	Home	(China) Shanghai Shenhua
Suwon Samsung Bluewings	Round of 16	Round of 16	1–2	1–2	—	(Japan) Nagoya Grampus
Ulsan Hyundai	Group stage	Group E	Third place	1–3	Home	(Japan) Nagoya Grampus
Ulsan Hyundai	Group stage	Group E	Third place	1–4	Away	(Japan) Nagoya Grampus
Ulsan Hyundai	Group stage	Group E	Third place	0–2	Away	(Australia) Newcastle Jets
Ulsan Hyundai	Group stage	Group E	Third place	0–1	Home	(Australia) Newcastle Jets
Ulsan Hyundai	Group stage	Group E	Third place	1–0	Home	(China) Beijing Guoan
Ulsan Hyundai	Group stage	Group E	Third place	1–0	Away	(China) Beijing Guoan

=== FIFA Club World Cup ===
Team	Result	Round	Score	Opponent
Pohang Steelers	Third place	Quarter-finals	2–1	(Democratic Republic of the Congo) TP Mazembe
Pohang Steelers	Third place	Semi-finals	1–2	(Argentina) Estudiantes
Pohang Steelers	Third place	Third place match	1–1 (4–3 p)	(Mexico) Atlante

== See also ==
- Football in South Korea
