= 2011 WK-League =

WK League
- Season: 2011
- Dates: 21 March – 19 September 2011
- Champions: Goyang Daekyo Noonnoppi (2nd title)
- Matches: 84
- Goals: 243 (2.89 per match)
- Top goalscorer: Pretinha (18 goals)
- Biggest home win: Goyang 5–1 Chungnam; Suwon 5–1 Chungbuk
- Biggest away win: Jeonbuk 0–6 Goyang
- (Note: All statistics do not include play-off matches)

The 2011 WK League was the third season of the WK League, South Korea's women's football league. The regular season began on 21 March 2011 and ended on 19 September 2011. Two new clubs joined the league this season. Eight clubs played each other three times during 21 rounds. Unlike the previous season, the second and third-placed teams played in the one-legged semi-final (officially named "Play-off") after the regular season, and the semi-final winners played against the regular season winners in the two-legged final (officially named "Championship").

Defending champions Suwon FMC lost their title to Goyang Daekyo Noonnoppi.

== Teams ==
Locations of the 2011 WK League teams

Team	City/Province	Stadium	Capacity	Position in 2010
Busan Sangmu	Busan	Unknown	Unknown	6th place
Chungbuk Sportstoto	Chungbuk	Unknown	Unknown	—
Chungnam Ilhwa Chunma	Chungnam	Dangjin Sports Complex	11,770	5th place
Goyang Daekyo	Goyang	Goyang Stadium	41,311	3rd place
Incheon Hyundai Steel Red Angels	Incheon	Incheon Namdong Asiad Rugby Field	5,078	Runners-up
Jeonbuk KSPO	Jeonbuk	Unknown	Unknown	—
Seoul City Amazones	Seoul	Hyochang Stadium	15,194	4th place
Suwon FMC	Suwon	Suwon Sports Complex	11,808	Champions

== Regular season ==
=== League table ===
Pos	Team	Pld	W	D	L	GF	GA	GD	Pts	Qualification
1	Goyang Daekyo Noonnoppi (C)	21	19	1	1	64	16	+48	58	Qualification for playoffs final
2	Incheon Hyundai Steel Red Angels	21	12	5	4	37	18	+19	41	Qualification for playoffs semi-final
3	Suwon FMC	21	12	4	5	39	21	+18	40	Qualification for playoffs semi-final
4	Busan Sangmu	21	11	2	8	30	32	−2	35	
5	Chungnam Ilhwa Chunma	21	8	3	10	24	35	−11	27	
6	Seoul City Amazones	21	5	9	7	19	26	−7	24	
7	Jeonbuk KSPO	21	1	3	17	17	46	−29	6	
8	Chungbuk Sportstoto	21	1	3	17	13	49	−36	6	

Source: Soccerway
Rules for classification: 1) Points; 2) Goal difference; 3) Goals scored
(C) Champions

=== Results ===
==== Matches 1–14 ====
Home \ Away	BS	CBS	CIC	GDN	INC	JEO	SC	SUW
Busan Sangmu	—	2–1	2–1	1–5	1–5	3–0	2–1	0–1
Chungbuk Sportstoto	1–3	—	0–1	0–4	0–2	2–0	1–2	0–3
Chungnam Ilhwa Chunma	2–3	2–1	—	0–5	1–0	1–1	0–0	0–1
Goyang Daekyo Noonnoppi	2–1	2–0	5–1	—	2–1	3–0	2–0	4–2
Incheon Hyundai Steel Red Angels	2–2	4–0	3–0	0–2	—	2–1	1–1	2–2
Jeonbuk KSPO	0–2	2–1	2–3	0–6	1–2	—	1–2	0–2
Seoul City Amazones	1–0	0–0	1–2	0–2	0–2	2–1	—	2–2
Suwon FMC	2–0	5–1	3–2	1–2	0–1	2–0	0–0	—

Source: Soccerway
Legend: Blue = home team win; Yellow = draw; Red = away team win.

==== Matches 15–21 ====
Home \ Away	BS	CBS	CIC	GDN	INC	JEO	SC	SUW
Busan Sangmu	—		2–0		0–1		1–1	2–1
Chungbuk Sportstoto	0–1	—		0–3	1–3			
Chungnam Ilhwa Chunma			—			1–0		1–1
Goyang Daekyo Noonnoppi	3–0		3–2	—		3–2	3–1	
Incheon Hyundai Steel Red Angels			2–1	1–1	—		0–0	0–1
Jeonbuk KSPO	1–2	3–3			1–2	—		0–2
Seoul City Amazones		2–2	0–2			1–1	—	2–1
Suwon FMC		4–0		3–2				—

Source: Soccerway
Legend: Blue = home team win; Yellow = draw; Red = away team win.

== All-Star Game ==
Busan Sangmu, Chungbuk Sportstoto, Chungnam Ilhwa Chunma and Goyang Daekyo Noonnoppi Kangaroos players played for Team Gaia, while Incheon Hyundai Steel Red Angels, Jeonbuk KSPO, Seoul City Amazones, Suwon Facilities Management Corporation players played for Team Athena.

13 June 2011
19:00 UTC+9

Team Gaia	9–6	Team Athena
Park Hee-young 11', 24', 55', 84'; Kwon Hah-nul 28'; Kim Jin-young 41'; Lee Hyun-young 58'; Choi Soo-jin 60'; Han Song-i 90'		Karina 4'; Jeon Ga-eul 22'; Cho So-hyun 46'; Son Yun-hee 49'; Sung Hyun-ah 73'; Lee Yoo-ra 81'

Boeun Stadium, Boeun

== Championship playoffs ==
=== Bracket ===
Semi-final			Final
			1	Goyang Daekyo Noonnoppi	2	3	5
2	Incheon Hyundai Steel Red Angels (a.e.t.)	2		Incheon Hyundai Steel Red Angels	2	1	3
3	Suwon FMC	1

=== Semi-final ===
19 September 2011
19:00 UTC+9

Incheon Hyundai Steel Red Angels	2–1 (a.e.t.)	Suwon FMC
Sung Hyun-ah 15'; Ko Yoo-jung 94'		Jo A-ra 69'

Hwacheon Stadium, Hwacheon

=== Final ===
26 September 2011
19:00 UTC+9

Goyang Daekyo Noonnoppi	2–2	Incheon Hyundai Steel Red Angels
Yoo Han-byul 14'; Song Yoo-na 33'		Jung Seol-bin 30', 90+2'

Goyang Stadium, Goyang

29 September 2011
19:00 UTC+9

Incheon Hyundai Steel Red Angels	1–3	Goyang Daekyo Noonnoppi
Park Ji-young 69'		Yoo Han-byul 30'; Cha Yun-hee 53'; Pretinha 61'

Boeun Stadium, Boeun

Goyang Daekyo Noonnoppi won 5–3 on aggregate.

== See also ==
- 2011 in South Korean football
