= Song Ju-hee =

South Korean footballer and coach

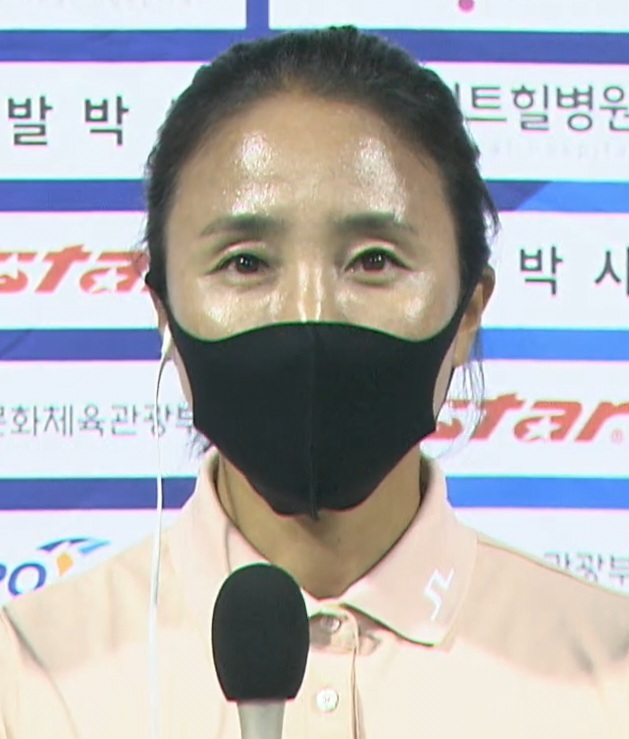

Personal information
- Full name: Song Ju-hee
- Date of birth: October 30, 1977 (age 48)
- Place of birth: South Korea
- Height: 1.66 m (5 ft 5 1/2 in)
- Positions: Forward; defender

Youth career
- Kyunghee University

Senior career*
Years	Team	Apps	(Gls)
2000–2002	Soongmin Wonders		
2003–2005	Hyundai INI Steel		
2006–2009	Chungnam Ilhwa Chunma	15	(3)

International career
1995–2008	Korea Republic	43	(3)

Managerial career
- 2011–2019: Jeonbuk KSPO (coach)
- 2019-2025: Gyeongju KHNP
- * Club domestic league appearances and goals

Song Ju-hee (Korean: 송주희, Korean pronunciation: [soŋ.dʑu.ɦi] or [soŋ] [tɕu.ɦi]; born October 30, 1977) is a retired South Korean football player and coach.

== Club career ==
After graduating from Uiryesang Technical High School and Kyunghee University, Song joined the newly established Soongmin Wonders in 2000. She was the team captain in 2002 when the club was disbanded. She then played for INI Steel and later, Chungnam Ilhwa Chunma, before retiring at the end of the 2009 season.

== International career ==
Song made her debut for the South Korean national team in a friendly match against New Zealand in 1995. She made a total of 43 appearances for her country from 1995-2008, including at the 2003 FIFA Women’s World Cup and three editions of the AFC Women’s Asian Cup

== Managerial career ==
Song joined Jeonbuk KSPO as a coach in 2011 and remained in the role for eight years. In late 2019 she was appointed as manager of Gyeongju KHNP WFC.

== Career statistics ==
=== Club ===
Club	Season	Korea Women's Football Championship (Spring/Fall)		National Women's Football Championship		National Sports Festival		Total	
Club	Season	Apps	Goals	Apps	Goals	Apps	Goals	Apps	Goals
Soongmin Wonders	2000	-/-	-/-	-		-		-	-
Soongmin Wonders	2001	-/-	-/-	-		-		-	-
Soongmin Wonders	2002	/1	/0	-		-			
Hyundai INI Steel	2003	/-	/-	-		-			
Hyundai INI Steel	2004	2/4	0/0	2	0	1	0	9	0
Hyundai INI Steel	2005	/	/						
Chungnam Ilhwa Chunma	2006	3/4	1/0						
Chungnam Ilhwa Chunma	2007	3/-	1/-	3	2	3	1	9	4
Chungnam Ilhwa Chunma	2008	3/4	0/2	3	0	3	1	13	3
Club	Season	WK League		National Women's Football Championship		National Sports Festival		Total	
Club	Season	Apps	Goals	Apps	Goals	Apps	Goals	Apps	Goals
Chungnam Ilhwa Chunma	2009	15	3	-		0	0	15	3

=== International ===
- 1995 AFC Women's Championship
- 1997 AFC Women's Championship
- 1999 Women's US Cup
- 2000 Women's US Cup
- 2003 AFC Women's Championship
- 2003 FIFA Women's World Cup
- 2005 EAFF Women's Football Championship
- 2008 EAFF Women's Football Championship

== Honours ==
=== Team ===
Korea Republic

- AFC Women's Asian Cup 4th Place: 1995; 3rd Place: 2003
- EAFF Women's Football Championship: 2005

=== Individual ===
- National Women's Football Championship MVP: 2004
- KFA Best Player Award: 2004
- Korea Women's Football Championship (Spring) MVP: 2005
- Korea Women's Football Championship (Spring) Top Scorer: 2007
- National Women's Football Championship Outstanding Player: 2007
