= Sung Hyun-ah (footballer) =

South Korean footballer

Personal information
- Date of birth: 5 May 1982 (age 44)
- Position: Forward

Senior career*
Years	Team	Apps	(Gls)
2002-	Daekyo Kangaroos		
- Seoul City
- Incheon Hyundai

International career^{‡}
2003-2006	South Korea	15	(2)
- * Club domestic league appearances and goals ‡ National team caps and goals as of 05:08, 24 March 2026 (UTC)

Sung Hyun-ah (Korean: 성현아; born 5 May 1982) is a South Korean former footballer who played as a forward for the South Korea women's national football team. She played at the 2003 FIFA Women's World Cup.

== Club career ==
Sung played for Daekyo Kangaroos from the time of the club's foundation in 2002. She later joined Seoul City Amazones. Sung then played for Incheon Hyundai, scoring a key goal in the team's first win of the 2010 WK League season and going on to score the winner in the first leg of that year's championship final against Suwon FMC.

In 2011, Sung scored twice in the final of the National Women's Football Championship to help Incheon lift the trophy.

== International career ==
In a group stage match against Hong Kong at the 2003 AFC Women's Championship, Sung scored a goal after just 38 seconds of play. This was the fastest goal the South Korean women's national team had ever scored, a record Sung held for over twenty years until it was broken by Choo Hyo-joo in 2024.
