= Kim Kyeong-hee =

South Korean footballer (born 2003)

Personal information
- Date of birth: March 17, 2003 (age 23)
- Height: 1.74 m (5 ft 9 in)
- Position: Goalkeeper

Team information
- Current team: Suwon FC
- Number: 16

Youth career
- -2015: Hwacheon Elementary School
- 2016-2018: Ganggyung Girls' Middle School
- 2019: Hwacheon High School
- 2020-2021: Chungnam Internet High School

Senior career*
Years	Team	Apps	(Gls)
2022	Changnyeong WFC		
2023-	Suwon FC		

International career^{‡}
2022	South Korea U-20	2	(0)
2024-	South Korea	3	(0)
- * Club domestic league appearances and goals ‡ National team caps and goals as of 06:54, 18 September 2026 (UTC)

Kim Kyeong-hee (Korean: 김경희, born 17 March 2003) is a South Korean footballer who plays as a goalkeeper for WK League side Suwon FC and the South Korea national team.

== Club career ==
Kim failed to secure a place at university upon her graduation from Chungnam Internet High School, but decided to enter the 2022 WK League new players draft. She was selected by Changnyeong WFC in the eighth round of the draft, becoming the first player to enter the WK League directly from high school.

Kim signed with Suwon FC ahead of the 2023 season. In 2024, she was the team's regular starting goalkeeper, and was named KWFF WK League goalkeeper of the year in recognition of her contribution to Suwon's league victory.

In 2026, Kim continued to start regularly for Suwon in the WK League, achieving her original aim of ten league clean sheets by the summer and adjusting her target to fifteen. She also played in the 2025-26 AFC Women's Champions League and the inaugural edition of the W Korea Cup.

== International career ==
Kim played at the 2022 FIFA U-20 Women's World Cup. She kept a clean sheet in South Korea's opening match against Canada, and received praise for her performance against Nigeria despite conceding a goal.

Kim received her first senior call-up for South Korea in 2022 under then-manager Colin Bell. She made her A match debut in 2024 in a friendly against Canada, playing only half the match before being replaced at half time by Min Yu-kyeong. Kim was named in South Korea's squad for the 2026 Asian Games.

== Honours ==
=== Suwon FC ===
- WK League
  - Champions: 2024
  - Runners-up: 2023

=== Individual ===
- KWFF WK League goalkeeper of the year: 2024
