= Hwang Bo-ram =

South Korean footballer

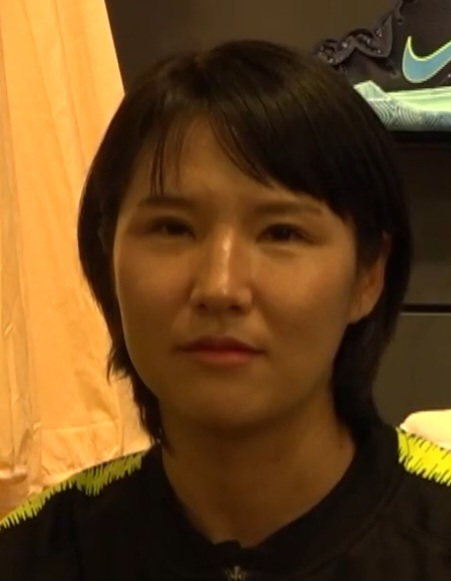

Personal information
- Date of birth: 6 October 1987 (age 39)
- Place of birth: Icheon, South Korea
- Height: 1.71 m (5 ft 7 1/2 in)
- Position: Defender

Youth career
- Yeungjin College

Senior career*
Years	Team	Apps	(Gls)
2008-2014	Icheon Daekyo		
2016-2023	Hwacheon KSPO		
2023-2024	Sejong Sportstoto	5	(1)

International career^{‡}
2006–2019	South Korea	35	(0)
- * Club domestic league appearances and goals ‡ National team caps and goals as of 18:59, 23 June 2015 (UTC)

- Hwang Bo-ram
- Hangul: 황보람
- RR: Hwang Boram
- MR: Hwang Poram

Hwang Bo-ram (Korean: 황보람; [hwaŋ.bo.ɾam] or [hwaŋ] [po.ɾam]; born 6 October 1987) is a South Korean former footballer who played as a defender for the South Korean women's national football team. She participated at the 2015 FIFA Women's World Cup.

== Club career ==
After graduating from Yeungjin College in 2008, Hwang joined Daekyo Kangaroos, where she played for eight years before transferring to Hwacheon KSPO. While at Hwacheon, she underwent surgery for a knee injury and in 2017, shortly after returning to football discovered that she was pregnant. After informing the club of her pregnancy, Hwang was initially excluded from training and told to use sick leave, but her contract was eventually terminated, despite the existence of maternity leave and childcare leave provisions. However, Hwang was encouraged to consider a post-partum return to football by the club's coaching staff, particularly Song Ju-hee, herself a former player who had continued to work in football after becoming a mother. Hwang returned to league football in 2019, continuing to play for Hwacheon KSPO. In 2022 she was honoured for reaching the milestone of 200 matches played in the WK League, and also received the 'Defender of the year' award at the 2022 WK League Awards. The following year, she transferred to Sejong Sportstoto. In 2024, Hwang retired from football.

== International career ==
Hwang received her first senior call-up for South Korea in 2006, making her debut at the Peace Cup. She played in the Cyprus Women's Cup in 2011 and 2012 and a friendly tournament in China in 2012 before being dropped from the squad for a while. She returned to the squad in 2015 for a pair of friendly matches with Russia and subsequently appeared at the 2015 FIFA Women's World Cup in Canada. When Hwang returned to football in 2019 after the birth of her daughter, she was included in South Korea's squad for the 2019 FIFA Women's World Cup in France, and became the first mother to play for the country's national team.

== Personal life ==
Hwang's then-boyfriend Lee Du-hee proposed to her after South Korea's draw with Costa Rica at the 2015 World Cup. The couple married in 2016 and their daughter Bom was born in February 2018. Hwang stopped playing football during her pregnancy but returned to the sport when her daughter was eight months old. Hwang's daughter, Lee Bom, appeared in the 2024 television series Little Giant Strikers (Korean: 달려라 불꽃소녀), which features the daughters of prominent Korean sportspeople playing in an under-7 football team coached by Lee Dong-guk.
