= Cha Yun-hee =

South Korean footballer (born 1986)

Personal information
- Date of birth: 26 February 1986 (age 40)
- Place of birth: South Korea
- Height: 1.67 m (5 ft 5 1/2 in)
- Position: Forward

Youth career
- 2001-2003: Gwangyang Girls' High School
- 2004-2005: Yeojoo Institute of Technology

Senior career*
Years	Team	Apps	(Gls)
2006–2017	Goyang Daekyo Noonnoppi	19	(10)
2009–2010	→ SC 07 Bad Neuenahr (loan)	19	(1)
2017	Gyeongju KHNP		

International career^{‡}
2004–2006	South Korea U20	13	(1)
2004–2013	South Korea	63	(13)

Managerial career
- 2020-: Gangwon FC Youth
Medal record
Women's football
Representing South Korea
Asian Games
Bronze medal – third place	2010 Guangzhou	Team
- * Club domestic league appearances and goals as of 27 June 2011 ‡ National team caps and goals as of 24 July 2013

- Cha Yun-hee
- Hangul: 차연희
- RR: Cha Yeonhui
- MR: Ch'a Yŏnhŭi

Cha Yun-hee (Korean: 차연희, Korean pronunciation: [tɕʰa.jʌn.çi]; born 26 February 1986) is a South Korean former footballer and manager and coach who last played for Gyeongju KHNP in the WK League.

== Early life ==
Born into a farming family in Haenam County, as a child Cha was a talented track and field athlete, but she was forced to take a break from the sport as a middle school student due to injury. However, a coach noticed her potential when she took part in a friendly football match, and she started playing football seriously while attending Gwangyang Girls' High School.

== Club career ==
In April 2009, she was loaned to SC 07 Bad Neuenahr for one year and two months, becoming the first female Korean footballer to play in Europe. She wanted to stay in Germany longer but her parent club Goyang Daekyo was struggling and recalled her to boost their performance. After Daekyo's disbandment in 2017, Cha was part of the first squad of Gyeongju KHNP WFC following its foundation. She retired from football at the end of the 2017 season.

== International career ==
Cha first trained with the national team in 2003 and was said to be in consideration for South Korea's squad for the 2003 FIFA Women's World Cup, despite only having played football for three years. She eventually made her debut for the team the following year. Cha was part of the South Korean team that won the 2005 EAFF Women's Football Championship.

== Managerial career ==
After retiring as a player, Cha took a year away from football and trained as a barista, but returned to the sport as a youth coach after being encouraged by a friend. At first, she volunteered at a local youth futsal team in Icheon, before joining Gangwon FC as manager of the youth academy and women's futsal team.

== Honors ==
=== Club ===
Icheon Daekyo

- WK League: 2011, 2012

=== International ===
- EAFF Women's Football Championship: 2005
- Asian Games Bronze medal: 2010

=== Individual ===
- WK League MVP: 2011, 2012
