= Lee Jeong-min (footballer, born 2000) =

South Korean footballer (born 2000)

Personal information
- Date of birth: 11 November 2000 (age 25)
- Place of birth: South Korea
- Height: 1.68 m (5 ft 6 in)
- Position: Winger

Team information
- Current team: Suwon FC
- Number: 19

Youth career
- -2012: Myeongseo Elementary School
- 2013-2015: Daesan Middle School
- 2016-2018: Chungnam Internet High School
- 2019-2020: Uiduk University

Senior career*
Years	Team	Apps	(Gls)
2021-2025	Mungyeong Sangmu		
2026-	Suwon FC		

International career
2018-2020	South Korea U20	6	(1)
2021-	South Korea	2	(0)
- * Club domestic league appearances and goals

Lee Jeong-min (Korean: 이정민, born 11 November 2000) is a South Korean professional footballer who plays as a winger for WK League club Suwon FC and the South Korea national team.

== Youth career ==
While playing at the U18 level, Lee represented Chungnam Internet High School, scoring twice in the final of the 2017 National Women's Football Championship to secure her team the trophy for the first time in five years.

== Club career ==
After leaving Uiduk University, Lee joined military team Boeun Sangmu in 2021. As part of the Sangmu team, she represented South Korea at the Women's Military World Cup in 2022, scoring twice in the third place playoff match to help the side win the bronze medal. The following year, she scored the winning goal that saw South Korea lift the trophy at the 2023 World Military Games. Lee left Mungyeong Sangmu and ended her military service in June 2025.

Lee signed with Suwon FC ahead of the 2026 WK League season.

== International career ==
Lee received her first senior call-up for South Korea in 2020. She was the first player from the military team to be named in a South Korea squad.

She was part of the South Korean squad that finished as runners-up at the 2022 AFC Women's Asian Cup.

== Honours ==
=== Chungnam Internet High School ===
- National Women's Football Championship winners: 2017

=== Mungyeong Sangmu WFC ===
- Women's Military World Cup bronze medal: 2022
- World Military Games winners: 2023

=== Individual ===
- Korea Football Association Young Player of the Year: 2021
