= 2009 Korea National League Championship =

Tournament details
- Country: South Korea
- City: Yanggu, Gangwon
- Dates: 1–12 June 2009
- Teams: 15

Final positions
- Champions: Goyang KB Kookmin Bank (1st title)
- Runner-up: Daejeon KHNP

Tournament statistics
- Top goal scorer(s): Nam Ki-il

Awards
- Best player: Cha Jong-yoon

The 2009 Korea National League Championship was the sixth edition of the Korea National League Championship. Amateur club Gumi Siltron was invited to the competition.

== Group stage ==
=== Group A ===
| Pos | Team | Pld | W | D | L | GF | GA | GD | Pts |
|---|---|---|---|---|---|---|---|---|---|
| 1 | Busan Transportation Corporation | 2 | 1 | 1 | 0 | 4 | 1 | +3 | 4 |
| 2 | Hyundai Mipo Dockyard | 2 | 1 | 1 | 0 | 3 | 1 | +2 | 4 |
| 3 | Incheon Korail | 2 | 0 | 0 | 2 | 0 | 5 | −5 | 0 |

1 June 2009
14:00 UTC+9

| Incheon Korail | 0–2 | Hyundai Mipo Dockyard |
|---|---|---|
| | Report | Choi Chul-woo 23'; Kim Young-nam 65' |

Yanggu Sports Complex A, Yanggu

3 June 2009
16:00 UTC+9

| Incheon Korail | 0–3 | Busan Transportation Corporation |
|---|---|---|
| | Report | Ha Tae-keun 28'; Kim Do-yong 52'; Park Dong-il 79' |

Yanggu Sports Complex A, Yanggu

5 June 2009
16:00 UTC+9

| Busan Transportation Corporation | 1–1 | Hyundai Mipo Dockyard |
|---|---|---|
| Lim Song-in 54' | Report | Choi Jong-hoan 53' |

Yanggu Sports Complex A, Yanggu

=== Group B ===
| Pos | Team | Pld | W | D | L | GF | GA | GD | Pts |
|---|---|---|---|---|---|---|---|---|---|
| 1 | Daejeon KHNP | 3 | 2 | 1 | 0 | 4 | 2 | +2 | 7 |
| 2 | Suwon City | 3 | 2 | 0 | 1 | 4 | 2 | +2 | 6 |
| 3 | Changwon City | 3 | 1 | 1 | 1 | 6 | 3 | +3 | 4 |
| 4 | Hongcheon Idu | 3 | 0 | 0 | 3 | 1 | 8 | −7 | 0 |

1 June 2009
16:00 UTC+9

| Suwon City | 2–1 | Changwon City |
|---|---|---|
| Yoo Su-hyun 76'; Jang Hyeok 90+1' | Report | Song Geun-soo 60' |

Yanggu Sports Complex A, Yanggu

1 June 2009
16:00 UTC+9

| Hongcheon Idu | 1–2 | Daejeon KHNP |
|---|---|---|
| Lee Seon-hoo 38' | Report | Kim Jung-kyum 19'; Hong Deok-jong 86' |

Yanggu Sports Complex B, Yanggu

3 June 2009
14:00 UTC+9

| Suwon City | 2–0 | Hongcheon Idu |
|---|---|---|
| Park Jong-chan 13', 65' | Report |

Yanggu Sports Complex B, Yanggu

3 June 2009
14:00 UTC+9

| Changwon City | 1–1 | Daejeon KHNP |
|---|---|---|
| Lee Kil-yong 17' | Report | Lee Soo-in 9' |

Yanggu Sports Complex A, Yanggu

5 June 2009
14:00 UTC+9

| Daejeon KHNP | 1–0 | Suwon City |
|---|---|---|
| Lee Soo-in 80' | Report |

Yanggu Sports Complex B, Yanggu

5 June 2009
14:00 UTC+9

| Hongcheon Idu | 0–4 | Changwon City |
|---|---|---|
| | Report | Choi Myung-sung 15'; Lee Kil-yong 21'; Lee Sang-geun 58'; Song Geun-soo 82' |

Yanggu Sports Complex A, Yanggu

=== Group C ===
| Pos | Team | Pld | W | D | L | GF | GA | GD | Pts |
|---|---|---|---|---|---|---|---|---|---|
| 1 | Goyang KB Kookmin Bank | 3 | 2 | 1 | 0 | 3 | 0 | +3 | 7 |
| 2 | Gangneung City | 3 | 1 | 2 | 0 | 6 | 4 | +2 | 5 |
| 3 | Cheonan City | 3 | 1 | 1 | 1 | 6 | 6 | 0 | 4 |
| 4 | Yesan FC | 3 | 0 | 0 | 3 | 1 | 6 | −5 | 0 |

2 June 2009
14:00 UTC+9

| Goyang KB Kookmin Bank | 0–0 | Gangneung City |
|---|---|---|
| | Report |

Yanggu Sports Complex A, Yanggu

2 June 2009
14:00 UTC+9

| Cheonan City | 2–1 | Yesan FC |
|---|---|---|
| Nam Ki-il 38', 90+1' | Report | Baek Hyung-do 22' |

Yanggu Sports Complex B, Yanggu

4 June 2009
16:00 UTC+9

| Goyang KB Kookmin Bank | 1–0 | Cheonan City |
|---|---|---|
| Park Sung-jin 23' | Report |

Yanggu Sports Complex B, Yanggu

4 June 2009
16:00 UTC+9

| Gangneung City | 2–0 | Yesan FC |
|---|---|---|
| Ko Min-gi 29'; Han Kyung-sung 53' | Report |

Yanggu Sports Complex A, Yanggu

6 June 2009
16:00 UTC+9

| Yesan FC | 0–2 | Goyang KB Kookmin Bank |
|---|---|---|
| | Report | Han Soo-bin 62'; Choi Jae-young 68' |

Yanggu Sports Complex B, Yanggu

6 June 2009
16:00 UTC+9

| Cheonan City | 4–4 | Gangneung City |
|---|---|---|
| Moon Soon-ho 21'; Yoon Won-cheol 33'; Nam Ki-il 42', 44' | Report | Ko Min-gi 45'; Hwang Seok-hoon 70'; Kim Jin-seok 73'; Hwang Seong-ju 74' |

Yanggu Sports Complex A, Yanggu

=== Group D ===
| Pos | Team | Pld | W | D | L | GF | GA | GD | Pts |
|---|---|---|---|---|---|---|---|---|---|
| 1 | Gimhae FC | 3 | 2 | 1 | 0 | 6 | 3 | +3 | 7 |
| 2 | Ansan Hallelujah | 3 | 1 | 1 | 1 | 4 | 3 | +1 | 4 |
| 3 | Gumi Siltron | 3 | 0 | 3 | 0 | 4 | 4 | 0 | 3 |
| 4 | Nowon Hummel Korea | 3 | 0 | 1 | 2 | 2 | 6 | −4 | 1 |

2 June 2009
16:00 UTC+9

| Gimhae FC | 2–2 | Gumi Siltron |
|---|---|---|
| Lee Jin-hee 62'; Yang Dong-cheol 76' | Report | Kwon Soon-wook 12'; Kim Young-joon 15' |

Yanggu Sports Complex A, Yanggu

2 June 2009
16:00 UTC+9

| Nowon Hummel Korea | 0–3 | Ansan Hallelujah |
|---|---|---|
| | Report | Jeon Jae-hee 13', 78'; Park Bo-bae 86' |

Yanggu Sports Complex B, Yanggu

4 June 2009
14:00 UTC+9

| Gimhae FC | 2–1 | Nowon Hummel Korea |
|---|---|---|
| Yang Dong-cheol 31'; Kim Jae-young 68' (o.g.) | Report | Kwon Hyuk-min 86' |

Yanggu Sports Complex B, Yanggu

4 June 2009
14:00 UTC+9

| Gumi Siltron | 1–1 | Ansan Hallelujah |
|---|---|---|
| Lee Kwang-yong 34' | Report | Lim Seong-ho 2' |

Yanggu Sports Complex A, Yanggu

6 June 2009
14:00 UTC+9

| Ansan Hallelujah | 0–2 | Gimhae FC |
|---|---|---|
| | Report | Lee Seung-hwan 68'; Chu Woon-ki 70' |

Yanggu Sports Complex B, Yanggu

6 June 2009
14:00 UTC+9

| Nowon Hummel Korea | 1–1 | Gumi Siltron |
|---|---|---|
| Han Ji-ho 41' | Report | Lee Ki-yong 25' |

Yanggu Sports Complex A, Yanggu

== Knockout stage ==
=== Bracket ===
Quarter-finals
Busan Transportation Corporation | 2
Gangneung City | 1
Daejeon KHNP | 5
Ansan Hallelujah | 1
Goyang KB Kookmin Bank | 3
Hyundai Mipo Dockyard | 2
Gimhae FC (p) | 0 (5)
Suwon City | 0 (3)

Semi-finals
Busan Transportation Corporation | 0
Daejeon KHNP | 2
Goyang KB Kookmin Bank | 2
Gimhae FC | 0

Final
Daejeon KHNP | 1
Goyang KB Kookmin Bank | 3

=== Quarter-finals ===
8 June 2009
14:00 UTC+9

| Busan Transportation Corporation | 2–1 | Gangneung City |
|---|---|---|
| | Report |

Yanggu Sports Complex B, Yanggu

8 June 2009
14:00 UTC+9

| Daejeon KHNP | 5–1 | Ansan Hallelujah |
|---|---|---|
| | Report |

Yanggu Sports Complex A, Yanggu

8 June 2009
16:00 UTC+9

| Goyang KB Kookmin Bank | 3–2 | Hyundai Mipo Dockyard |
|---|---|---|
| | Report |

Yanggu Sports Complex B, Yanggu

8 June 2009
16:00 UTC+9

| Gimhae FC | 0–0 | Suwon City |
|---|---|---|
| | Report |
Penalties
| | 5–3 |

Yanggu Sports Complex A, Yanggu

=== Semi-finals ===
10 June 2009
14:00 UTC+9

| Busan Transportation Corporation | 0–2 | Daejeon KHNP |
|---|---|---|
| | Report |

Yanggu Sports Complex A, Yanggu

10 June 2009
16:00 UTC+9

| Goyang KB Kookmin Bank | 2–0 | Gimhae FC |
|---|---|---|
| | Report |

Yanggu Sports Complex A, Yanggu

=== Final ===
12 June 2009
14:00 UTC+9

| Daejeon KHNP | 1–3 | Goyang KB Kookmin Bank |
|---|---|---|
| | Report |

Yanggu Sports Complex A, Yanggu

== See also ==
- 2009 in South Korean football
- 2009 Korea National League
