= Jung Ji-yeon =

South Korean footballer (born 1996)

Personal information
- Date of birth: 1 September 1996 (age 30)
- Place of birth: Incheon, South Korea
- Height: 1.62 m (5 ft 4 in)
- Positions: Wing back; winger

Team information
- Current team: Hwacheon KSPO
- Number: 2

Youth career
- 2008-2009: Gajeong Girls' Middle School
- 2010: Hyundai Chungeun Middle School
- 2011-2013: Hyundai High School
- 2014-2015: Yeoju University

Senior career*
Years	Team	Apps	(Gls)
2016	Sejong City Sports Council	0	(0)
2017	Suwon FMC	4	(0)
2018-2021	Gyeongju KHNP	33	(0)
2022-	Hwacheon KSPO	88	(2)

International career^{‡}
2011	South Korea U-17	0	(0)
2014-2015	South Korea U-20	1	(0)
2024-	South Korea	1	(0)
- * Club domestic league appearances and goals as of 2 October 2025 ‡ National team caps and goals as of 3 December 2024

Jung Ji-yeon (Korean: 정지연; born 1 September 1996) is a South Korean professional footballer who plays as a defender for WK League club Hwacheon KSPO and the South Korea national team.

== Club career ==
Jung joined Hwacheon KSPO ahead of the 2022 WK League season. She scored her league debut goal in a match against her former team, Gyeongju KHNP. In 2025, Jung was named as club captain and earned the season MVP award from the Korea Women's Football Federation for her role in achieving Hwacheon's first ever WK League championship title. The club also won at the National Women's Football Championship and the National Sports Festival, completing the first ever domestic treble in South Korean women's football. Jung also received the MVP award at the 2025 National Women's Football Championship.

== International career ==
Having previously represented South Korea at the 2015 AFC U-19 Women's Championship, Jung received her first senior international call-up in 2024 under recently appointed manager Shin Sang-woo. She has one international cap at senior level, having played in a friendly match against Canada.

== Style of play ==
Jung is known as a versatile player thanks to her two-footedness. She mostly plays as a wing back but occasionally plays as a winger.

== Honours ==
=== Hwacheon KSPO ===
- WK League
  - Winners: 2025
  - Runners-up: 2024
- National Women's Football Championship
  - Winners: 2025
- National Sports Festival
  - Winners: 2025

=== Individual ===
- KWFF WK League Best 11: 2024, 2025
- KWFF WK League MVP: 2025
- National Women's Football Championship MVP: 2025
