= Soongmin Wonders =

1999–2002 South Korean football club

- Full name: Soongmin Wonders W.F.C.
- Founded: 1999
- Dissolved: 2002
- Owner: Lee Gwang-nam
- Chairman: Park Jong-hwan
- Manager: Ha Sung-joon

Soongmin Wonders (Korean: 숭민원더스 여자축구단) was a South Korean women's football club based in Gwangju, Gyeonggi Province.

== History ==
The club was founded on 13 December 1999 by Lee Gwang-nam, the director of the multi-level marketing company Soongmin Group. At the time of its official launch, Soongmin Wonders had a squad of eighteen players, nine of whom had played for the South Korea women's national team. The club was the third women's works football team to be established in South Korea, following Incheon Hyundai in 1993 and Hebron Mission earlier in 1999. Soongmin offered the highest wages of any club of its kind.

In 2002, the club's chairman Lee Gwang-nam was arrested and charged with embezzlement. Shortly afterwards, Soongmin Wonders was disbanded, with many of its former players moving to INI Steel (formerly Incheon Hyundai) or the newly established Daekyo Kangaroos.

== Honours ==
- Korean Women's League
  - Winners (1): 2001
- President's Cup (Women's Division)
  - Winners (1): 2000
- Soongmin Women's Football Championship
  - Winners (1): 2001

== Noted players ==
- Song Ju-hee, manager of Gyeongju KHNP WFC
