= 2009 Korea National League =

Kyobo Life Korea National League
- Season: 2009
- Dates: 10 April – 14 November 2009
- Champions: Gangneung City (1st title)
- Matches: 173
- Goals: 483 (2.79 per match)
- Best Player: Na Il-kyun
- Top goalscorer: Lee Yong-seung (16 goals)

The 2009 Korea National League was the seventh season of the Korea National League. The league was divided into two stages, and the top two clubs of the overall table qualified for the championship playoffs in addition to the winners of each stage. The first stage began on 11 April, and ended on 11 July. The second stage started on 21 August, and ended on 22 November.

== Regular season ==
=== First stage ===
| Pos | Team | Pld | W | D | L | GF | GA | GD | Pts | Qualification |
|---|---|---|---|---|---|---|---|---|---|---|
| 1 | Gimhae City | 13 | 8 | 2 | 3 | 26 | 20 | +6 | 26 | Qualification for the playoffs |
| 2 | Busan Transportation Corporation | 13 | 7 | 2 | 4 | 25 | 15 | +10 | 23 | |
| 3 | Incheon Korail | 13 | 6 | 5 | 2 | 20 | 13 | +7 | 23 | |
| 4 | Changwon City | 13 | 6 | 5 | 2 | 21 | 15 | +6 | 23 | |
| 5 | Gangneung City | 13 | 6 | 4 | 3 | 21 | 15 | +6 | 22 | |
| 6 | Ansan Hallelujah | 13 | 6 | 4 | 3 | 19 | 14 | +5 | 22 | |
| 7 | Suwon City | 13 | 5 | 6 | 2 | 25 | 16 | +9 | 21 | |
| 8 | Goyang KB Kookmin Bank | 13 | 4 | 4 | 5 | 18 | 16 | +2 | 16 | |
| 9 | Hyundai Mipo Dockyard | 13 | 4 | 3 | 6 | 18 | 17 | +1 | 15 | |
| 10 | Cheonan City | 13 | 4 | 3 | 6 | 14 | 18 | −4 | 15 | |
| 11 | Daejeon KHNP | 13 | 3 | 5 | 5 | 21 | 23 | −2 | 14 | |
| 12 | Yesan FC | 13 | 3 | 4 | 6 | 13 | 25 | −12 | 13 | |
| 13 | Nowon Hummel Korea | 13 | 3 | 1 | 9 | 12 | 21 | −9 | 10 | |
| 14 | Hongcheon Idu | 13 | 1 | 2 | 10 | 11 | 36 | −25 | 5 | |

Source: Korea National League (in Korean)
Rules for classification: 1) Points; 2) Goal difference; 3) Goals scored

=== Second stage ===
| Pos | Team | Pld | W | D | L | GF | GA | GD | Pts | Qualification |
|---|---|---|---|---|---|---|---|---|---|---|
| 1 | Changwon City | 12 | 8 | 3 | 1 | 23 | 13 | +10 | 27 | Qualification for the playoffs |
| 2 | Suwon City | 12 | 7 | 4 | 1 | 21 | 7 | +14 | 25 | |
| 3 | Gangneung City | 12 | 7 | 3 | 2 | 20 | 15 | +5 | 24 | |
| 4 | Hyundai Mipo Dockyard | 12 | 6 | 3 | 3 | 21 | 14 | +7 | 21 | |
| 5 | Goyang KB Kookmin Bank | 12 | 5 | 4 | 3 | 17 | 15 | +2 | 19 | |
| 6 | Gimhae City | 12 | 4 | 4 | 4 | 19 | 17 | +2 | 16 | |
| 7 | Incheon Korail | 12 | 5 | 1 | 6 | 11 | 15 | −4 | 16 | |
| 8 | Ansan Hallelujah | 12 | 4 | 3 | 5 | 11 | 10 | +1 | 15 | |
| 9 | Daejeon KHNP | 12 | 3 | 5 | 4 | 14 | 18 | −4 | 14 | |
| 10 | Cheonan City | 12 | 4 | 1 | 7 | 15 | 13 | +2 | 13 | |
| 11 | Busan Transportation Corporation | 12 | 4 | 1 | 7 | 17 | 20 | −3 | 13 | |
| 12 | Nowon Hummel Korea | 12 | 3 | 3 | 6 | 16 | 21 | −5 | 12 | |
| 13 | Yesan FC | 12 | 0 | 1 | 11 | 11 | 38 | −27 | 1 | |
| 14 | Hongcheon Idu | 0 | 0 | 0 | 0 | 0 | 0 | 0 | 0 | Withdrawal (Note: Withdrew due to financial problem.) |

Source: Korea National League (in Korean)
Rules for classification: 1) Points; 2) Goal difference; 3) Goals scored

=== Overall table ===
| Pos | Team | Pld | W | D | L | GF | GA | GD | Pts | Qualification |
|---|---|---|---|---|---|---|---|---|---|---|
| 1 | Changwon City | 25 | 14 | 8 | 3 | 44 | 28 | +16 | 50 | Second stage winners |
| 2 | Suwon City | 25 | 12 | 10 | 3 | 46 | 23 | +23 | 46 | Qualification for the playoffs |
| 3 | Gangneung City | 25 | 13 | 7 | 5 | 41 | 30 | +11 | 46 | Qualification for the playoffs |
| 4 | Gimhae City | 25 | 12 | 6 | 7 | 45 | 37 | +8 | 42 | First stage winners |
| 5 | Incheon Korail | 25 | 11 | 6 | 8 | 31 | 28 | +3 | 39 | |
| 6 | Ansan Hallelujah | 25 | 10 | 7 | 8 | 30 | 24 | +6 | 37 | |
| 7 | Hyundai Mipo Dockyard | 25 | 10 | 6 | 9 | 39 | 31 | +8 | 36 | |
| 8 | Busan Transportation Corporation | 25 | 11 | 3 | 11 | 42 | 35 | +7 | 36 | |
| 9 | Goyang KB Kookmin Bank | 25 | 9 | 8 | 8 | 35 | 31 | +4 | 35 | |
| 10 | Cheonan City | 25 | 8 | 4 | 13 | 29 | 31 | −2 | 28 | |
| 11 | Daejeon KHNP | 25 | 6 | 10 | 9 | 35 | 41 | −6 | 28 | |
| 12 | Nowon Hummel Korea | 25 | 6 | 4 | 15 | 28 | 42 | −14 | 22 | |
| 13 | Yesan FC | 25 | 3 | 5 | 17 | 24 | 63 | −39 | 14 | |
| 14 | Hongcheon Idu | 13 | 1 | 2 | 10 | 11 | 36 | −25 | 5 | Withdrawal (Note: Withdrew due to financial problem.) |

Source: Korea National League (in Korean)
Rules for classification: 1) Points; 2) Goal difference; 3) Goals scored

=== Result ===
| Home \ Away | ASH | BTC | CWC | CAC | DHN | GNC | GHC | GKB | HOC | HMD | ICK | NWH | SWC | YES |
|---|---|---|---|---|---|---|---|---|---|---|---|---|---|---|
| Ansan Hallelujah | — | 1–2 | 0–1 | 2–0 | 0–0 | 1–0 | 1–0 | 0–0 | 1–0 | 2–1 | 2–3 | 2–0 | 0–0 | 4–1 |
| Busan Transportation Corporation | 1–3 | — | 1–2 | 2–3 | 2–2 | 3–1 | 3–1 | 0–1 | 0–1 | 2–0 | 0–0 | 3–1 | 2–3 | 2–2 |
| Changwon City | 2–1 | 1–4 | — | 1–0 | 3–2 | 1–2 | 3–3 | 3–0 | — | 0–0 | 1–0 | 4–3 | 1–1 | 3–1 |
| Cheonan City | 0–1 | 1–3 | 1–1 | — | 1–2 | 1–2 | 1–2 | 1–0 | — | 0–2 | 4–0 | 3–1 | 0–1 | 3–0 |
| Daejeon KHNP | 2–2 | 1–3 | 2–4 | 1–0 | — | 1–1 | 1–4 | 0–0 | 5–2 | 1–1 | 0–2 | 2–0 | 1–1 | 3–1 |
| Gangneung City | 1–0 | 2–1 | 2–1 | 0–0 | 1–1 | — | 3–0 | 2–4 | — | 2–2 | 1–0 | 1–1 | 0–0 | 2–0 |
| Gimhae City | 3–1 | 1–3 | 2–2 | 1–1 | 2–1 | 1–3 | — | 2–0 | 3–2 | 3–2 | 0–1 | 0–0 | 1–1 | 3–1 |
| Goyang KB Kookmin Bank | 3–3 | 0–1 | 1–1 | 2–1 | 1–0 | 2–2 | 1–1 | — | 4–1 | 2–4 | 1–0 | 2–1 | 1–2 | 4–1 |
| Hongcheon Idu | — | — | 0–0 | 1–2 | — | 1–5 | — | — | — | — | — | 1–1 | 1–6 | 1–2 |
| Hyundai Mipo Dockyard | 1–0 | 3–1 | 0–1 | 1–0 | 1–1 | 1–3 | 0–1 | 3–1 | 3–0 | — | 1–2 | 2–1 | 1–1 | 1–2 |
| Incheon Korail | 1–0 | 2–0 | 1–1 | 1–1 | 1–2 | 1–2 | 3–2 | 1–1 | 4–0 | 2–1 | — | 2–1 | 0–2 | 1–0 |
| Nowon Hummel Korea | 0–1 | 2–0 | 0–2 | 3–0 | 2–1 | 1–2 | 0–1 | 2–1 | — | 1–3 | 2–2 | — | 0–2 | 1–0 |
| Suwon City | 2–2 | 1–0 | 0–1 | 1–3 | 3–0 | 4–0 | 2–4 | 0–0 | — | 1–1 | 2–0 | 3–1 | — | 1–1 |
| Yesan FC | 0–0 | 0–3 | 1–4 | 0–2 | 3–3 | 2–1 | 1–4 | 0–3 | — | 1–4 | 1–1 | 2–3 | 2–6 | — |

Source: Korea National League
Legend: Blue = home team win; Yellow = draw; Red = away team win.

== Championship playoffs ==
=== Bracket ===
Semi-finals
Gimhae City | 2
Suwon City | 1
Changwon City | 1
Gangneung City | 3

Final
Gimhae City | 0 | 2 | 2
Gangneung City | 1 | 3 | 4

=== Semi-finals ===
14 November
15:00 UTC+9

| Gimhae City | 2–1 | Suwon City |
|---|---|---|
| Yang Dong-cheol 79'; Jo Jae-hyun 84' | Report | Park Jong-chan 3' |

Gimhae Stadium, Gimhae
Attendance: 1,500
Referee: Kim Sang-woo

14 November
17:00 UTC+9

| Changwon City | 1–3 | Gangneung City |
|---|---|---|
| Song Geun-soo 9' | Report | Na Il-gyun 28', 81'; An Seong-hoon 62' |

Changwon Civil Stadium, Changwon
Attendance: 800
Referee: Kim Jong-hyuk

=== Final ===
18 November
19:00 UTC+9

| Gimhae City | 0–1 | Gangneung City |
|---|---|---|
| | Report | Lee Dong-joon 29' |

Gimhae Stadium, Gimhae
Attendance: 1,000

21 November
19:00 UTC+9

| Gangneung City | 3–2 | Gimhae City |
|---|---|---|
| Ko Min-ki 22'; An Sung-hoon 74'; Kim Jun-beom 89' | Report | Choi Hyung-joon 53'; Kim Hyo-joon 90+4' |

Gangneung Stadium, Gangneung

Gangneung City won 4–2 on aggregate.

== Awards ==
=== Main awards ===
| Award | Winner | Club |
|---|---|---|
| Most Valuable Player | (South Korea) Na Il-kyun | Gangneung City |
| Top goalscorer | (South Korea) Lee Yong-seung | Busan Transportation Corporation |
| Top assist provider | (South Korea) Kim Jung-kyum | Daejeon KHNP |
| Manager of the Year | (South Korea) Park Mun-young | Gangneung City |
| Club of the Year | Ansan Hallelujah | |
| Fair Play Award | Goyang KB Kookmin Bank | |

=== Best XI ===
| Position | Winner | Club |
|---|---|---|
| Goalkeeper | (South Korea) Na Kyung-man | Ansan Hallelujah |
| Defenders | (South Korea) Kim Jung-kyum | Daejeon KHNP |
| Defenders | (South Korea) Don Ji-deok | Goyang KB Kookmin Bank |
| Defenders | (South Korea) Kim Ho-yoo | Hyundai Mipo Dockyard |
| Defenders | (South Korea) Jung Jae-woon | Suwon City |
| Midfielders | (South Korea) Na Il-kyun | Gangneung City |
| Midfielders | (South Korea) Lee Seung-hwan | Gimhae City |
| Midfielders | (South Korea) Nam Ki-il | Cheonan City |
| Midfielders | (South Korea) Choi Myung-sung | Changwon City |
| Forwards | (South Korea) Ko Min-ki | Gangneung City |
| Forwards | (South Korea) Lee Yong-seung | Busan Transportation Corporation |

== See also ==
- 2009 in South Korean football
- 2009 Korea National League Championship
- 2009 Korean FA Cup
