= Min Yu-kyeong =

South Korean association football player

Personal information
- Date of birth: June 9, 1995 (age 31)
- Height: 1.78 m (5 ft 10 in)
- Position: Goalkeeper

Team information
- Current team: Hwacheon KSPO
- Number: 1

Youth career
- 2008-2010: Gwangyeong Middle School
- 2011-2013: Gwangyang Girls High School
- 2014-2015: Hanyang Women's University

Senior career*
Years	Team	Apps	(Gls)
2016-2022	Suwon FMC		
2023-	Hwacheon KSPO		

International career^{‡}
2009	South Korea U-14	1	(0)
2011	South Korea U-17	5	(0)
2012-2013	South Korea U-20	11	(0)
2015	South Korea Universiade	10	(0)
2014-	South Korea	1	(0)
- * Club domestic league appearances and goals ‡ National team caps and goals as of 05:01, 28 April 2026 (UTC)

Min Yu-kyeong (Korean: 민유경, born 9 June 1995) is a South Korean professional footballer who plays as a goalkeeper for WK League side Hwacheon KSPO and the South Korean national team.

== Early life ==
Min started playing football with boys at elementary school but took the sport up more seriously in sixth grade after being scouted by a coach from a football academy programme at another local school.

== Club career ==
Min was selected by Suwon FMC in the fifth round of the 2016 WK League new players draft. In 2023, Min moved to Hwacheon KSPO and was named as club captain, leading the team to their first WK League playoff in six years. In 2025, after Hwacheon lifted the WK League trophy and completed a domestic treble, Min was named in the Best XI at the annual WK League Awards.

== International career ==
Min played for South Korea at several youth levels. She was the country's first-choice goalkeeper at the 2014 FIFA U-20 Women's World Cup, at which South Korea reached the quarter-finals.

She received her first senior international call-up in 2014. She was part of South Korea's squad at the 2014 AFC Women's Asian Cup. Min was included in the first South Korea squad selected by newly appointed manager Shin Sang-woo in 2024, but withdrew due to injury.

== Honours ==
=== Hwacheon KSPO ===
- WK League
  - Champions: 2025
  - Runners-up: 2024
- National Sports Festival
  - Champions: 2024, 2025
- National Women's Football Championship
  - Champions: 2025

=== Individual ===
- KWFF WK League Awards
  - Best XI: 2025
