= Nam Ki-il =

South Korean footballer and manager

Personal information
- Full name: Nam Ki-il
- Date of birth: August 17, 1974 (age 52)
- Place of birth: Suncheon, Jeonnam, South Korea
- Height: 1.77 m (5 ft 10 in)
- Position: Midfielder

Youth career
- Kyunghee University

Senior career*
Years	Team	Apps	(Gls)
1997–2003	Bucheon SK	122	(19)
2004	Jeonnam Dragons	19	(1)
2005–2008	Seongnam Ilhwa Chunma	62	(13)
2009–2010	Cheonan City	40	(6)

Managerial career
- 2009–2010: Cheonan City FC (player-coach)
- 2011–2012: Gwangju FC
- 2013: Gwangju FC (assistant)
- 2013–2014: Gwangju FC (caretaker)
- 2015–2017: Gwangju FC
- 2017–2019: Seongnam FC
- 2020–2023: Jeju United FC
- 2024–2025: Henan FC
- * Club domestic league appearances and goals

- Nam Ki-il
- Hangul: 남기일
- Hanja: 南基一
- RR: Nam Giil
- MR: Nam Kiil

Nam Ki-il (born August 17, 1974) is a South Korean former football player and current football manager.

== Club career ==
He played for Bucheon SK, Jeonnam Dragons, Seongnam Ilhwa Chunma and Cheonan City FC.

== Career statistics ==
=== Club ===
Club performance			League		Cup		League Cup		Continental		Total	
Season	Club	League	Apps	Goals	Apps	Goals	Apps	Goals	Apps	Goals	Apps	Goals
South Korea			League		KFA Cup		League Cup		Asia		Total	
1997	Bucheon SK	K League 1	12	0			6	0	-			
1998	Bucheon SK	K League 1	6	0			9	1	-			
1999	Bucheon SK	K League 1	16	1			4	0	-			
2000	Bucheon SK	K League 1	7	1			4	0	-			
2001	Bucheon SK	K League 1	27	9			8	0	-			
2002	Bucheon SK	K League 1	24	3			8	1	-			
2003	Bucheon SK	K League 1	30	5	4	0	-		-		34	5
2004	Chunnam Dragons	K League 1	19	1	3	0	10	1	-		32	2
2005	Seongnam Ilhwa	K League 1	20	7	1	0	8	0	-		29	7
2006	Seongnam Ilhwa	K League 1	20	4	1	1	12	4	-		33	9
2007	Seongnam Ilhwa	K League 1	19	2	1	0	1	0	7	0	28	2
2008	Seongnam Ilhwa	K League 1	3	0	1	0	4	0	-		8	0
2009	Cheonan City	National League	22	5	1	0	-		-		23	5
2010	Cheonan City	National League	18	1	2	0	-		-		20	1
Total	South Korea		243	39			74	7	7	0		
Career total			243	39			74	7	7	0		
