= 2010 WK-League =

WK League
- Season: 2010
- Dates: 22 March – 30 September 2010
- Champions: Suwon FMC (1st title)
- Matches: 60
- Goals: 164 (2.73 per match)
- Top goalscorer: Pretinha (13 goals)
- Biggest home win: Goyang 6–0 Busan
- Biggest away win: Chungnam 0–5 Suwon
- (Note: All statistics do not include play-off matches)

The 2010 WK League was the second season of the WK League, South Korea's women's football league. The regular season began on 22 March 2010 and ended on 30 September 2010. Six clubs competed as a quadruple round-robin, for a total of 20 matches. Daekyo Kangaroos were the defending champions.

== Teams ==
Locations of the 2010 WK League teams

| Team | City/Province | Stadium | Capacity | Position in 2009 |
|---|---|---|---|---|
| Busan Sangmu | Busan | Unknown | Unknown | 5th place |
| Chungnam Ilhwa Chunma | Chungnam | Dangjin Sports Complex | 11,770 | 4th place |
| Daekyo Kangaroos | Goyang (Note: Daekyo Kangaroos represented Goyang in the WK League, and Gyeongnam in the Korean National Sports Festival.) | Goyang Stadium | 41,311 | Champions |
| Incheon Hyundai Steel Red Angels | Incheon | Incheon Namdong Asiad Rugby Field | 5,078 | Runners-up |
| Seoul City Amazones | Seoul | Hyochang Stadium | 15,194 | 3rd place |
| Suwon FMC | Suwon | Suwon Sports Complex | 11,808 | 6th place |

== Regular season ==
=== League table ===
| Pos | Team | Pld | W | D | L | GF | GA | GD | Pts | Qualification |
|---|---|---|---|---|---|---|---|---|---|---|
| 1 | Incheon Hyundai Steel Red Angels | 20 | 13 | 2 | 5 | 32 | 21 | +11 | 41 | Qualification for Championship |
| 2 | Suwon FMC (C) | 20 | 12 | 3 | 5 | 29 | 17 | +12 | 39 | Qualification for Championship |
| 3 | Daekyo Kangaroos | 20 | 12 | 2 | 6 | 37 | 17 | +20 | 38 | |
| 4 | Seoul City Amazones | 20 | 7 | 2 | 11 | 23 | 32 | −9 | 23 | |
| 5 | Chungnam Ilhwa Chunma | 20 | 5 | 4 | 11 | 19 | 35 | −16 | 19 | |
| 6 | Busan Sangmu | 20 | 3 | 3 | 14 | 24 | 42 | −18 | 12 | |

Source: WK League (in Korean)
Rules for classification: 1) Points; 2) Goal difference; 3) Goals scored
(C) Champions

=== Results ===
==== Matches 1–10 ====
| Home \ Away | BUS | CIC | DK | HDS | SEO | SUW |
|---|---|---|---|---|---|---|
| Busan Sangmu | — | 2–0 | 0–1 | 1–4 | 0–1 | 0–2 |
| Chungnam Ilhwa Chunma | 3–2 | — | 1–0 | 1–2 | 1–0 | 1–1 |
| Daekyo Kangaroos | 2–2 | 0–1 | — | 2–2 | 4–1 | 1–2 |
| Incheon Hyundai Steel Red Angels | 3–2 | 1–0 | 1–2 | — | 1–2 | 1–0 |
| Seoul City Amazones | 3–1 | 1–1 | 0–4 | 2–0 | — | 0–1 |
| Suwon FMC | 2–2 | 2–0 | 1–0 | 1–2 | 2–1 | — |

Source: WK League (in Korean)
Legend: Blue = home team win; Yellow = draw; Red = away team win.

==== Matches 11–20 ====
| Home \ Away | BUS | CIC | DK | HDS | SEO | SUW |
|---|---|---|---|---|---|---|
| Busan Sangmu | — | 2–2 | 0–1 | 2–4 | 2–0 | 0–1 |
| Chungnam Ilhwa Chunma | 3–2 | — | 1–0 | 1–2 | 0–2 | 0–5 |
| Daekyo Kangaroos | 6–0 | 4–1 | — | 1–2 | 2–1 | 2–1 |
| Incheon Hyundai Steel Red Angels | 1–0 | 1–0 | 0–1 | — | 3–1 | 2–1 |
| Seoul City Amazones | 3–2 | 2–2 | 0–2 | 1–0 | — | 1–2 |
| Suwon FMC | 0–2 | 2–1 | 1–0 | 0–0 | 2–1 | — |

Source: WK League (in Korean)
Legend: Blue = home team win; Yellow = draw; Red = away team win.

== All-Star Game ==
Incheon Hyundai Steel Red Angels, Seoul City Amazones and Suwon Facilities Management Corporation players played for the Central team, while Busan Sangmu, Chungnam Ilhwa Chunma and Daekyo Kangaroos players played for the South team.

1 July 2010
UTC+9 15:00

| Central | 3–4 | South |
|---|---|---|
| Kim Joo-hee 36'; Barbara 39'; Karina 85' | | Ko Tae-hwa 33'; Pretinha 41'; Kang Sun-mi 64'; Yoo Young-a 77' |

Hwacheon Stadium, Hwacheon

== Championship ==
27 September 2010
UTC+9 19:00

| Incheon Hyundai Steel Red Angels | 1–0 | Suwon FMC |
|---|---|---|
| Sung Hyun-a 83' |

Busan Gudeok Stadium, Busan

30 September 2010
UTC+9 19:00

| Suwon FMC | 2–0 | Incheon Hyundai Steel Red Angels |
|---|---|---|
| Jeon Ga-eul 56', 63' |

Ulsan Complex Stadium, Ulsan

Suwon FMC won 2–1 on aggregate.

== See also ==
- 2010 in South Korean football
