= 2009 WK-League =

WK League
- Season: 2009
- Champions: Daekyo Kangaroos (1st title)
- Matches: 60
- Goals: 144 (2.4 per match)
- Top goalscorer: Lee Jang-mi (10 goals)
- Biggest home win: Incheon 5–0 Busan
- Biggest away win: Busan 0–4 Chungnam
- (Note: All statistics do not include play-off matches)

The 2009 WK League was the inaugural season of the WK League, the South Korean women's football league. It began on 20 April 2009 with the first matches of the regular season and ended on 16 November 2009 with the return leg of the Championship Final. The slogan of the 2009 season was "Beautiful Football".

A total of six teams competed in the 2009 season, playing each other four times during the regular season for a total of 20 matches per team. Daekyo Kangaroos won the two-legged final 2–0 to become the inaugural champions.

== Teams ==
Locations of the 2009 WK League teams

Team	City/Province	Stadium	Capacity
Busan Sangmu	Busan	Unknown	Unknown
Chungnam Ilhwa Chunma	Chungnam	Dangjin Sports Complex	11,77
Daekyo Kangaroos	Gyeongnam	Gyeongju Civic Stadium	12,199
Incheon Hyundai Steel Red Angels	Incheon	Incheon Namdong Asiad Rugby Field	5,078
Seoul City Amazones	Seoul	Hyochang Stadium	15,194
Suwon FMC	Suwon	Suwon Sports Complex	11,808

== Regular season ==
=== League table ===
Pos	Team	Pld	W	D	L	GF	GA	GD	Pts	Qualification
1	Daekyo Kangaroos (C)	20	15	3	2	38	13	+25	48	Qualification for Championship
2	Incheon Hyundai Steel Red Angels	20	9	8	3	25	7	+18	35	Qualification for Championship
3	Seoul City Amazones	20	8	5	7	27	25	+2	29	
4	Chungnam Ilhwa Chunma	20	3	9	8	18	24	−6	18	
5	Busan Sangmu	20	4	6	10	21	39	−18	18	
6	Suwon FMC	20	4	3	13	15	36	−21	15	

Source: WK League (in Korean)
Rules for classification: 1) Points; 2) Goal difference; 3) Goals scored
(C) Champions

=== Results ===
==== Matches 1–10 ====
Home \ Away	BUS	CIC	DK	HDS	SEO	SUW
Busan Sangmu	—	0–4	0–2	1–0	2–3	2–1
Chungnam Ilhwa Chunma	1–1	—	0–2	1–1	0–2	3–0
Daekyo Kangaroos	1–1	2–0	—	0–2	3–2	5–1
Incheon Hyundai Steel Red Angels	5–0	0–0	0–0	—	1–0	2–0
Seoul City Amazones	2–1	2–1	0–1	0–2	—	1–0
Suwon FMC	0–2	1–1	0–3	0–2	0–0	—

Source: WK League (in Korean)
Legend: Blue = home team win; Yellow = draw; Red = away team win.

==== Matches 11–20 ====
Home \ Away	BUS	CIC	DK	HDS	SEO	SUW
Busan Sangmu	—	1–1	1–3	0–0	1–3	0–2
Chungnam Ilhwa Chunma	2–2	—	0–2	0–0	2–0	0–1
Daekyo Kangaroos	2–1	3–0	—	2–1	2–2	3–1
Incheon Hyundai Steel Red Angels	3–0	0–0	0–1	—	1–0	0–0
Seoul City Amazones	2–2	2–2	1–0	1–1	—	4–1
Suwon FMC	2–3	2–0	0–1	1–4	2–0	—

Source: WK League (in Korean)
Legend: Blue = home team win; Yellow = draw; Red = away team win.

== All-Star Game ==
The six teams were split into two regions: Incheon Hyundai Steel Red Angels, Seoul City Amazones, and Suwon Facilities Management Corporation comprised the Central region, while the Southern region consisted of Busan Sangmu, Chungnam Ilhwa Chunma, and Daekyo Kangaroos. Both regions sent their best players for the All-Star Game.

Kim Joo-hee of the Hyundai Steel Redangels was named player of the match.

10 August 2009
UTC+9 20:00

Team Central	6–3	Team South
Kim Joo-hee 6', 12', 18', 63'; Jeon Ga-eul 48'; Kim Yoo-jin 75'		Pretinha 4', 8'; Ko Tae-hwa 51'

International Football Center, Mokpo
Attendance: 1,000
Referee: Kim Sook-hee

== Championship ==
9 November 2009
UTC+9 19:00

Incheon Hyundai Steel Red Angels	0–1	Daekyo Kangaroos
	Report	Lee Eun-hea 51'

Goyang Stadium, Goyang
Attendance: 1,200
Referee: Lee Young-choon

16 November 2009
UTC+9 15:00

Daekyo Kangaroos	1–0	Incheon Hyundai Steel Red Angels
Lee Jang-mi 81'	Report

Gyeongju Stadium, Gyeongju
Attendance: 600
Referee: Lee Kang-wook

Daekyo Kangaroos won 2–0 on aggregate.

== See also ==
- 2009 in South Korean football
