= Chungnam Ilhwa Chunma WFC =

2006–2012 South Korean football club

- Full name: Ilhwa Chunma Women's Football Club
- Founded: 2006
- Dissolved: 2012
- Ground: Dangjin Stadium
- Capacity: 5,000
Home colours	Away colours

Chungnam Ilhwa Chunma Women's Football Club (Korean: 충남 일화 천마 여자 축구단) was a South Korean women's football team based in Chungnam. Founded in 2006, the club played in the WK League from 2009 until 2012, when it was dissolved.

== Honours ==
- National Women's Football Championship
  - Winners (2): 2007, 2011
  - Runners-up (1): 2008

== Records ==
=== Year-by-year ===
Season	WK League regular season								Playoffs
Season	P	W	D	L	GF	GA	Pts	Pos.	Playoffs
2009	20	3	9	8	18	24	18	4th	Did not qualify
2010	20	5	4	11	19	35	19	5th	Did not qualify
2011	21	8	3	10	24	35	27	5th	Did not qualify
2012	21	3	6	12	16	30	15	7th	Did not qualify
