= WK League =

Semi-professional women's football league, run by the Korea Football Association

- Founded: 2009; 17 years ago
- Country: South Korea
- Confederation: AFC (Asia)
- Number of clubs: 8
- Level on pyramid: 1
- International cup: AFC Women's Champions League
- Current champions: Gyeongju KHNP (1st title) (2026)
- Most championships: Incheon Hyundai Steel Red Angels (11 titles)
- Website: kwff.or.kr
- Current: 2026 WK League

The WK League (Korean: WK리그) is a semi-professional women's football league, run by the Korea Football Association (KFA) and the Korea Women's Football Federation (KWFF), which represents the sport's highest level in South Korea.

Icheon Daekyo won the inaugural edition of the WK League in 2009 and won two more titles in 2011 and 2012. Incheon Hyundai Steel Red Angels are the most successful team in the league, having won eleven consecutive titles between 2013 and 2023.

== History ==
=== Development and establishment of the league ===
In 2006, the Korea Women's Football Federation (KWFF) announced their intention to start a semi-professional women's league the following year with four teams playing 12 to 15 games each across four or five rounds. At the end of 2006 discussions were being held over player eligibility rules, in particular the issue of visas for foreign players. In January 2007, the KWFF clarified that the women's league would not be referred to as a professional league, and that official names under consideration included WK League, following the name of the men's K League and adding a "W" to stand for "women's".

In 2008, the KWFF launched an exhibition league as a pilot for the planned year-round league, with four teams participating in three rounds, to be held alongside pre-existing football tournaments. Daekyo Kangaroos won the exhibition league. Following the pilot scheme, it was announced that the WK League would be launched in 2009.

Due to the issue of securing stadiums in major cities, it was deemed too difficult to operate a home-and-away system. Instead, cities were selected to host a number of rounds each. The first edition of the league was contested by six teams over four rounds and 63 matches, including an all-star game and the championship final. Matches were held on Monday nights to avoid clashes with other professional sports.

=== Early years of the WK League (2009–2012) ===
The first match of the 2009 WK League took place on 20 April 2009 at Wolmyeong Sports Complex in Gunsan between Daekyo Kangaroos and Hyundai Steel, resulting in a 0–0 draw. Daekyo finished the regular season in first place and went on to win the championship final against Hyundai Steel to become the inaugural WK League champions.

In 2010, the South Korean government announced plans to invest in women's football, including the creation of two new clubs to compete in the WK League. Jeonbuk KSPO and Chungbuk Sportstoto were both formally launched ahead of the 2011 season, bringing the total number of teams in the league to eight. However, the following year the league was reduced to seven teams following the dissolution of Chungnam Ilhwa. From 2012 to 2016, the league continued with seven teams, meaning one team would sit out each round.

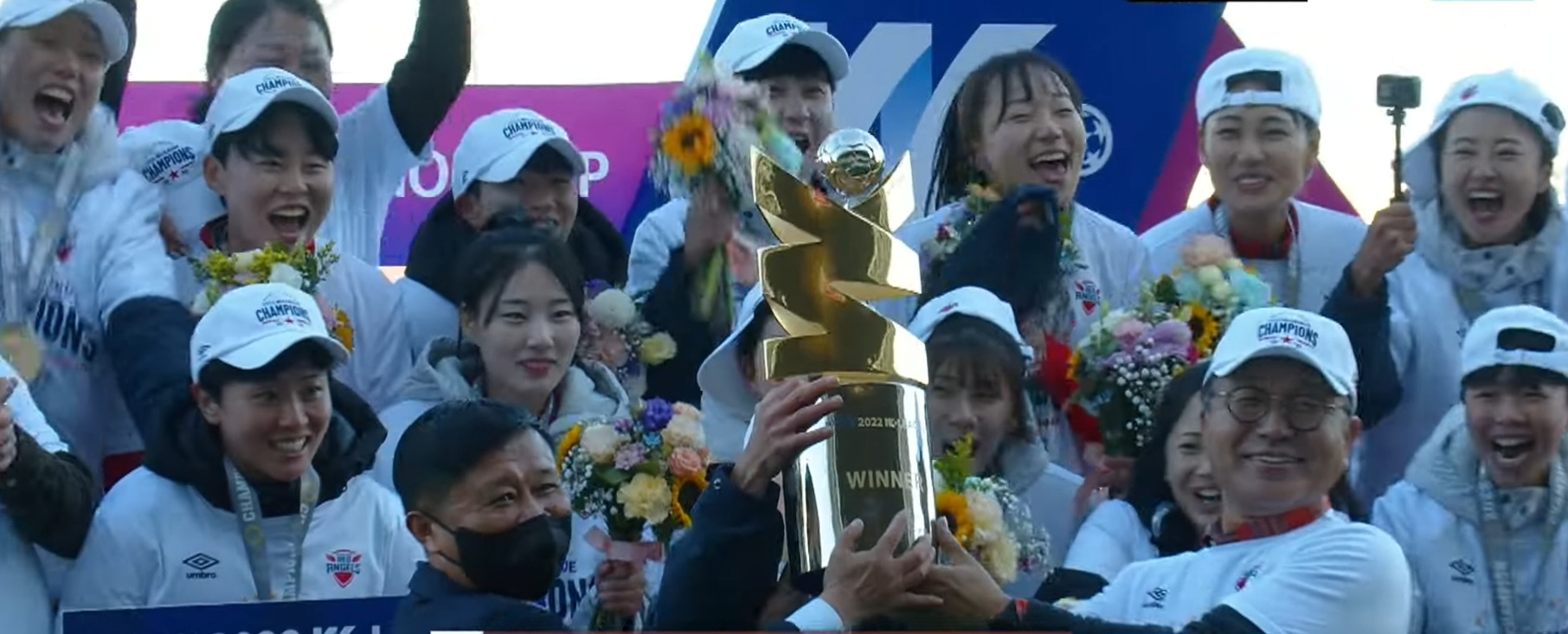
Incheon Hyundai Steel Red Angels lift the WK League trophy in 2022

In 2013, the WK League drew the attention of local and international media following claims by six clubs that Seoul WFC striker Park Eun-sun was in fact a man. It was reported that coaches from six teams threatened to boycott the 2014 league unless Park took a gender verification test. Seoul WFC accused their rivals of violating Park's human rights and demanded an apology. Park also received support from an online petition as well as Democratic Party politician Jun Byung-hun, who called for an investigation by the National Human Rights Commission. The six coaches involved claimed that the controversy was a private joke that had been leaked and blown out of proportion. Lee Sung-gyun of Suwon FMC and Yoo Dong-gwan of Goyang Daekyo resigned in the aftermath of the row. In February 2014, the National Human Rights Commission advised the Korea Football Association (KFA) to punish the coaches, but neither the KFA nor the league itself handed down any punishment and as a result, Park eventually left Seoul to join FC Rossiyanka.

=== Incheon dominance (2013–2023) ===
The 2013 season also saw Incheon Hyundai Steel Red Angels win their first WK League title, having finished as runners-up every year from 2009 to 2012. The club went on to win eleven consecutive titles. During this period of Incheon dominance, in 2015, the league began a home-and-away system for the first time, allowing teams to establish stronger connections with regional governments and fanbases. Gyeongju KHNP WFC joined the league in the 2017 season, bringing the total number of teams back to eight. At the end of the season, Icheon Daekyo ceased operations but was replaced in the WK League by new team Changnyeong WFC.

=== Recent years (2024–present) ===
The Red Angels' run of WK League success came to an end in 2024, when the club finished in fourth place, outside of the playoff places for the first time in the history of the league. Despite finishing second in the regular league, Suwon beat Hwacheon KSPO on aggregate in the championship final to lift the trophy for the second time, and the first time since the club merged with the Suwon FC men's team and rebranded as Suwon FC Women in 2022. KSPO won their first title the following year, beating underdogs Seoul City in the championship final to become the first team in the history of South Korean women's football to complete a domestic treble.

Ahead of the 2026 season, Changnyeong WFC moved to Gangjin County in South Jeolla Province and rebranded as Gangjin Swans WFC, becoming the region's first WK League side.

== Competition format ==
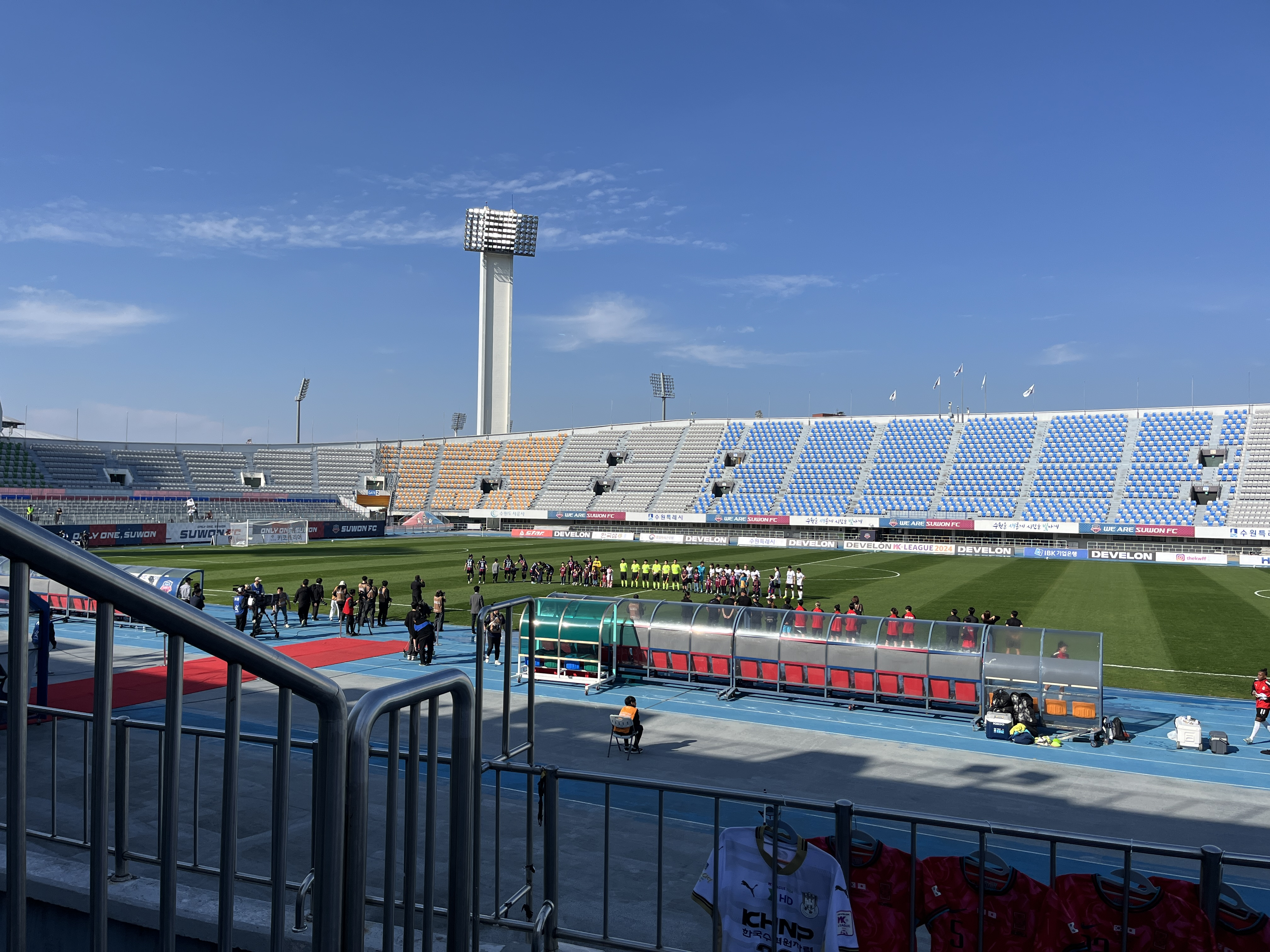
The 2024 WK League play-off match between Suwon FC and Gyeongju KHNP, held at Suwon Sports Complex

During the regular season, contested from March to September, each team plays a total of 28 games, playing four times against each of the other seven teams. Teams receive three points for a win and one point for a draw. No points are awarded for a loss. Teams are ranked by total points.

In the case that teams are level on points, tie-breakers are applied in the following order:

1. Goal difference
2. Head-to-head results
3. Total goals scored
4. Total wins
5. Drawing lots

Then, the second and third-placed teams of the regular season face off in a one-legged play-off, with the winners facing the first-placed team of the regular season in a two-legged championship game. The remaining teams are ranked from fourth to eighth.

The regular season was reduced to 21 games in 2020 and 2021 due to the COVID-19 pandemic in South Korea. A shortened season was maintained in 2022 due to the 2022 FIFA U-20 Women's World Cup and the 2022 Asian Games, and again in 2023 due to the 2023 FIFA Women's World Cup. The 2024 edition of the league saw a return to the 28-round regular season.

The WK League is the only women's league in the country and as such there is no relegation system in place.

== All-Star Game ==
The first all-star game was held on 10 August 2009, with players from all teams in the league competing as "Central All Stars" (players from Incheon Hyundai, Seoul WFC, and Suwon FMC) and "Southern All Stars" (players from Daekyo Kangaroos, Chunhnam Ilhwa, and Busan Sangmu). The game ended with a 3–2 victory for the Central All Stars. In 2010, following the same format, the Southern All Stars won 4–3.

Following the expansion of the league in 2011, the all-star game was contested between "Team Gaia" (Goyang Daekyo, Busan Sangmu, Chungnam Ilhwa, Chungbuk Sportstoto) and "Team Athena" (Suwon FMC, Incheon Hyundai, Seoul WFC, Jeonbuk KSPO) and ended in a 9–6 win for Team Gaia, with six goals scored in the first half alone.

In 2012, the format changed once again, with teams divided into two based on their position in the league following the 9th round of the regular season. While players were previously selected based on coaches' recommendations, for the first time fans were able to vote for coaches and players to participate. In an effort to promote the WK League and women's football more widely, the all-star game also featured attractions and gimmicks such as an autograph signing event, unique goal celebrations, celebrity guests, and a goalkeeper taking a penalty kick. The "Blue Mir" team (Goyang Daekyo, Jeonbuk KSPO, Chungnam Ilhwa, Suwon FMC) won 5–4 against the "Red Mir" team (Hyundai Steel, Seoul WFC, Chungbuk Sportstoto, Busan Sangmu). The 2013 all-star game saw a 4–4 draw between team "Phenomenon" (Hyundai Steel, Jeonbuk KSPO, Suwon FMC, Busan Sangmu) and team "Fantasy Star" (Goyang Daekyo, Chungbuk Sportstoto, Seoul WFC), with elaborate pre-rehearsed goal celebrations such as dancing to Psy's hit song "Gentleman" and a portrayal of baseball player Ryu Hyun-jin's pitch.

The 2014 all-star game was due to be held on 2 June, but was cancelled following the sinking of the MV Sewol, with the KWFF stating that it would not be appropriate to hold such a festive event during a period of national mourning. The event did not take place in 2015 due to South Korea's participation in the 2015 FIFA Women's World Cup.

When the all-star game returned to the schedule in 2016, it had a new format. Rather than an exhibition match between two all-star teams from within the league, a WK League all-stars team selected by a technical committee played against 1. FFC Frankfurt in a friendly match held at Ulsan Stadium. The game finished as a 1–1 draw, and the WK League side won 5–3 in a penalty shoot-out.

In 2017, the all-star game was held after the end of the league season in November rather than during the mid-season break. The WK League all-star team, selected by fan vote, hosted INAC Kobe Leonessa at Incheon Namdong Stadium in a match that resulted in a 2–2 draw. The WK League side won the subsequent penalty shoot-out 4–2. Following developments in inter-Korean relations, the KWFF hoped to invite a North Korean team for the 2018 all-star game, but an agreement could not be reached and the game was cancelled.

In 2019 and 2022, an all-star game was included in the league schedule with the date, location, and teams listed as "undecided".

== Clubs ==
=== Current clubs ===
Team	Location	Stadium	First season	Current spell	Seasons (Note: As of the start of the 2026 season.)	Last title
Gangjin Swans WFC	Gangjin	Gangjin Yeongrang Stadium	2018	2018–present	9	—
Gyeongju KHNP	Gyeongju	Gyeongju Football Park	2017	2017–present	10	2026
Hwacheon KSPO	Hwacheon	Hwacheon Sports Park	2011	2011–present	16	2025
Incheon Hyundai Steel Red Angels	Incheon	Incheon Namdong Asiad Rugby Field	2009	2009–present	18	2023
Mungyeong Sangmu	Mungyeong	Mungyeong Civic Stadium	2009	2009–present	18	—
Sejong Sportstoto	Sejong	Sejong Civic Stadium	2011	2011–present	16	—
Seoul City	Seoul	Seoul World Cup Stadium Auxiliary Pitch	2009	2009–present	18	—
Suwon FC	Suwon	Suwon Sports Complex	2009	2009–present	18	2024

=== Former clubs ===
Club	First season	Last season
Chungnam Ilhwa Chunma	2009	2012
Icheon Daekyo	2009	2017

== Champions ==
The following is a list of all seasons' finals.

=== Finals ===
Season	Champions	Aggregate	Runners-up	First leg	Second leg
2009	Daekyo Kangaroos	2–0	Incheon Hyundai Steel Red Angels	1–0	1–0
2010	Suwon FMC	2–1	Incheon Hyundai Steel Red Angels	0–1	2–0
2011	Goyang Daekyo Noonnoppi	5–3	Incheon Hyundai Steel Red Angels	2–2	3–1
2012	Goyang Daekyo Noonnoppi	3–2	Incheon Hyundai Steel Red Angels	0–1	3–1
2013	Incheon Hyundai Steel Red Angels	4–2	Seoul WFC	1–1	3–1
2014	Incheon Hyundai Steel Red Angels	1–0	Goyang Daekyo Noonnoppi	1–0	0–0
2015	Incheon Hyundai Steel Red Angels	1–1 (4–3 p)	Icheon Daekyo	0–0	1–1 (a.e.t.)
2016	Incheon Hyundai Steel Red Angels	4–0	Icheon Daekyo	0–0	4–0
2017	Incheon Hyundai Steel Red Angels	6–0	Hwacheon KSPO	3–0	3–0
2018	Incheon Hyundai Steel Red Angels	4–4 (3–1 p)	Gyeongju KHNP	0–3	4–1 (a.e.t.)
2019	Incheon Hyundai Steel Red Angels	1–0	Suwon UDC	0–0	1–0
2020	Incheon Hyundai Steel Red Angels	2–0	Gyeongju KHNP	0–0	2–0
2021	Incheon Hyundai Steel Red Angels	2–1	Gyeongju KHNP	1–1	1–0
2022	Incheon Hyundai Steel Red Angels	2–0	Gyeongju KHNP	0–0	2–0
2023	Incheon Hyundai Steel Red Angels	7–5	Suwon FC	1–3	6–2
2024	Suwon FC	3–2	Hwacheon KSPO	2–0	1–2
2025	Hwacheon KSPO	7–5	Seoul City	3–2	4–3
2026	Gyeongju KHNP	1–0	Suwon FC	0–0	1–0

=== Performance by club ===
Club	Champions	Runners-up	Seasons won	Seasons runner-up
Incheon Hyundai Steel Red Angels	11	4	2013, 2014, 2015, 2016, 2017, 2018, 2019, 2020, 2021, 2022, 2023	2009, 2010, 2011, 2012
Icheon Daekyo	3	3	2009, 2011, 2012	2014, 2015, 2016
Suwon FC	2	3	2010, 2024	2019, 2023, 2026
Gyeongju KHNP	1	4	2026	2018, 2020, 2021, 2022
Hwacheon KSPO	1	2	2025	2017, 2024
Seoul City	0	2	—	2013, 2025

== Players ==
=== WK League draft ===
Each year the teams of the WK League participate in a draft to select new players from among graduating university students. Teams draw lots in the order of the previous year's final league position to determine the order of the draft. Drafted players' contract length and salary cap are determined by their position in the draft. Previously, draftees picked in the first four rounds of the draft signed '3+2' contracts, but these were changed to more basic three year contracts ahead of the 2026 season. The basic salaries for new draftees were also raised in 2026.

Round of draft	Contract length	Salary (2026)
1	3 years	₩34 million
2	3 years	₩32 million
3	3 years	₩30 million
4	3 years	₩26 million
5–10	1 year	₩26 million

=== Military team recruitment ===
The Sangmu (military team) originally participated in the draft along with the other teams. All Sangmu players are required to join the military as a non-commissioned officer and undergo basic training for four months, leading to questions over the welfare of players drafted by the club. The rules of the draft stated that if a player refused to join their drafted team, they were not permitted to sign to any team in the league for two years, making it difficult for rookie players to refuse to join the military if called up by Sangmu.

In 2014, South Korea international Choe Yu-ri was selected by Busan Sangmu as their first pick in the draft. At first, Choe expressed concerns about joining the military and in particular not being able to train with the national squad during military training. She eventually refused to enter the military on the grounds that it infringed upon her freedom to choose a career. The incident led the KWFF to revise the rules of the draft, and Choe was selected by Daejeon Sportstoto in a special draft in 2015, after missing a season of league football.

Since the 2016 season draft, rookie players can choose to apply to Sangmu, and the team selects their recruits from among the applicants. Applicants who are not selected are automatically included in the main draft. The Sangmu team is no longer permitted to participate in the draft.

=== Foreign players ===
When the league was established, each team was permitted to include two foreign players in their squad. Daekyo Kangaroos became the first team to field a foreign player when they signed Brazilian striker Pretinha in April 2009.

== Awards ==
=== Official awards ===
The WK League Awards were first introduced by the Korea Women's Football Federation in 2022.

General awards
Season	Most Valuable Player	Best new player	Best manager	Top goalscorer	Top assist provider	Best referee	Ref.
2022	—N/a (Note: The MVP category was added in 2025.)	Kwon Hee-sun (Suwon)	Kim Eun-sook (Incheon)	Moon Mi-ra (Suwon)	Josée Nahi (Gyeongju)	Kim Yu-jeong	
2023	—N/a	Chun Ga-ram (Hwacheon)	Kim Eun-sook (Incheon)	Moon Mi-ra (Suwon)	Ji So-yun (Suwon)	Cha Min-ji	
2024	—N/a	Lee Eun-young (Changnyeong)	Park Gil-young (Suwon)	Mai Kyokawa (Gyeongju)	Jang Sel-gi (Gyeongju)	Lee A-hyun	
2025	Jung Ji-yeon (Hwacheon)	Woo Seo-bin (Seoul)	Kang Sun-mi (Hwacheon)	Moon Mi-ra (Gyeongju)	Choi Yoo-jung (Hwacheon)	Kim Ji-hee	

Best player by position (2022–2024)
Season	Goalkeeper	Defender	Midfielder	Forward	Ref.
2022	Kim Jung-mi (Incheon)	Hwang Bo-ram (Sejong)	Ji So-yun (Suwon)	Choe Yu-ri (Incheon)	
2023	Kim Jung-mi (Incheon)	Kim Hye-ri (Incheon)	Ji So-yun (Suwon)	Moon Mi-ra (Suwon)	
2024	Kim Kyung-hee (Suwon)	Kim Hye-ri, Jung Ji-yeon (Incheon, Hwacheon)	Jang Sel-gi (Gyeongju)	Mai Kyokawa (Gyeongju)	

Best XI
Season	Goalkeeper	Defenders	Midfielders	Forwards	Ref.
2025	Min Yu-kyeong (Hwacheon)	Jung Ji-yeon (Hwacheon); Kim Mi-yeon (Seoul); Lee Min-hwa (Hwacheon); Jang Sel-gi (Gyeongju)	Mun Eun-ju (Hwacheon); Kwon Hah-nul (Mungyeong); Kim Min-ji (Seoul)	Choi Yoo-jung (Hwacheon); Moon Mi-ra (Gyeongju); Han Chae-rin (Seoul)	

=== KPFA awards (2024) ===
In 2024, some players expressed dissatisfaction with the KWFF's award ceremonies, which include several categories for youth football rather than focusing on the WK League, and at the time did not feature categories such as a Best XI or MVP. As a result, the Korea Pro Footballers' Association (KPFA) organised a separate WK League Awards ceremony, with the players themselves voting for the winners.

KPFA awards (2024)
Most Valuable Player	Best new player	Celebration award	Best XI				Ref.
Most Valuable Player	Best new player	Celebration award	Goalkeeper	Defenders	Midfielders	Forwards	Ref.
Mai Kyokawa (Gyeongju)	Lee Eun-young (Changnyeong)	Yeo Min-ji (Gyeongju)	Kang Ga-ae (Sejong)	Jang Sel-gi (Gyeongju); Kim Hye-ri (Incheon); Lee Min-hwa (Hwacheon); Jung Ji-yeon (Hwacheon)	Jang Chang (Incheon); Asuna Tanaka (Hwacheon); Kim Hye-ji (Gyeongju); Kwon Hah-nul (Mungyeong)	Mai Kyokawa (Gyeongju); Kang Chae-rim (Suwon)	

== Sponsorship ==
=== Title sponsors ===
Period	Sponsor	Sponsorship name	Ref.
2009–2010	Daekyo Noonnoppi	Daekyo Noonnoppi WK League	
2011–2017	Industrial Bank of Korea	Industrial Bank of Korea WK League	
2018	Hyundai Steel	Hyundai Steel H CORE 2018 WK League	
2019–2020	No sponsor	WK League	
2021	Hanwha Life	Hanwha Life 2021 WK League	
2022–2023	Hyundai Steel	Hyundai Steel WK League	
2024	Develon	Develon WK League	
2025–present	No sponsor		

=== Other partnerships ===
The official match ball of the WK League is the Sportstribe F24+. The Star Polaris 5000 (FIFA) was previously used. In 2026 the Korea Women's Football Federation signed an agreement with entertainment company BIGC to develop a WK League fandom platform.

== See also ==
- Football in South Korea
- Japan and South Korea Women's League Championship
- List of women's football clubs in South Korea
