= Suwon FC Women =

Suwon FC
- Full name: Suwon Football Club Women
- Founded: 2008; 18 years ago
- Ground: Suwon Sports Complex
- Capacity: 11,808
- Head coach: Park Kil-young
- League: WK League
- 2026: Regular season: 1st of 8 Playoffs: Runners-up
- Website: suwonfc.com
Home colours	Away colours

Suwon FC Women (Korean: 수원 FC 위민) is a South Korean women's football team based in Suwon. They compete in the WK League, the highest division of women's football in South Korea.

== History ==
In 2007, amid dwindling participation in women's and girls' football nationwide, the Suwon City Government announced its intention to form South Korea's sixth women's works football team. The club was founded in February 2008 as Suwon Facilities Management Corporation WFC. The team has played in the WK League since its inaugural season in 2009. Suwon FMC won the championship title in 2010.

In 2019, the club reached the championship final for the first time since their 2010 title win.

Before the 2022 WK League season, the club merged with the existing Suwon FC men's team and changed its name to Suwon FC Women. In 2022, Suwon signed Ji So-yun from Chelsea in a move that aimed to increase interest not only in the club, but in the WK League as a whole. Ji left the club to join NWSL side Seattle Reign in 2024, after Suwon reached the 2023 WK League championship final but ultimately finished as runners-up.

Suwon FC won its second WK League title in 2024, qualifying for the 2025–26 AFC Women's Champions League. In the group stage of the tournament, the club played against North Korean side Naegohyang WFC in the first ever inter-Korean clash in women's club football, eventually losing 3–0. Despite finishing third in the group, Suwon progressed to the knockout stage, where they defeated defending champions Wuhan Jiangda 4–0 to advance to the semi-finals, earning the right to host the competition's finals.

== Stadium ==
Suwon FC play their home matches at the main stadium of Suwon Sports Complex. Prior to the 2022 merging of Suwon FC and Suwon UDC, the two teams shared the stadium. The multi-purpose stadium has a capacity of 11,800.

== Current squad ==
As of 6 March 2026

Note: Flags indicate national team as defined under FIFA eligibility rules; some limited exceptions apply. Players may hold more than one non-FIFA nationality.

No.	Pos.	Nation	Player
1	GK	KOR	Park Hyun-jin
5	DF	KOR	Lee Su-in
6	DF	KOR	Lee Yu-jin (vice-captain)
7	MF	KOR	Kwon Eun-som
8	MF	JPN	Ayaka Nishikawa (vice-captain)
9	FW	BRA	Mileninha
10	MF	KOR	Ji So-yun (captain)
11	FW	KOR	Choe Yu-ri
13	FW	KOR	Song Ji-yoon
14	FW	KOR	Kim Ga-yeon
16	GK	KOR	Kim Kyeong-hee

No.	Pos.	Nation	Player
17	DF	KOR	Han Da-in
18	FW	KOR	Jeon Min-ji
19	FW	KOR	Lee Jeong-min
20	DF	KOR	Kim Hye-ri
22	DF	KOR	Seo Jin-ju
23	DF	KOR	Kwon Hui-seon
25	DF	KOR	Seo Ye-jin
26	DF	KOR	Yoon Su-jeong
27	MF	KOR	Lee Jin-joo
33	GK	KOR	Jung Yoon-jung
39	FW	JPN	Haruhi Suzuki

== Coaching staff ==
- Head coach: (South Korea) Park Kil-young
- Assistant coach: (South Korea) Lee Eun-mi
- Goalkeeping coach: (South Korea) Lee Sang-yeop
- Physical coach: (South Korea) Kim Dae-eun
- Medical trainers: (South Korea) Lee Han-na, (South Korea) Ham Ji-young
- Kit manager: (South Korea) Kim Ha-bin

Source: Official website

== Honours ==
- WK League
  - Winners (2): 2010, 2024
  - Runners-up (3): 2019, 2023, 2026
- National Women's Football Championship
  - Winners (2): 2010, 2019
  - Runners-up (2): 2014, 2018
- W Korea Cup
  - Winners (1): 2026

== Records ==
=== Year-by-year ===
Season	WK League regular season								Playoffs
Season	P	W	D	L	GF	GA	Pts	Pos.	Playoffs
2009	20	4	3	13	15	36	15	6th	Did not qualify
2010	20	12	3	5	29	17	39	2nd	Winners
2011	21	12	4	5	39	21	40	3rd	Semifinal
2012	21	6	6	9	29	39	24	6th	Did not qualify
2013	24	7	6	11	28	38	27	6th	Did not qualify
2014	24	8	5	11	20	31	29	5th	Did not qualify
2015	24	10	7	7	36	30	37	3rd	Semifinal
2016	24	4	8	12	26	38	20	6th	Did not qualify
2017	28	9	10	9	39	38	37	5th	Did not qualify
2018	28	14	8	6	48	34	50	3rd	Semifinal
2019	28	13	10	5	52	42	49	3rd	Runners-up
2020	21	11	0	10	34	24	33	3rd	Semifinal
2021	21	9	3	9	35	27	30	3rd	Semifinal
2022	21	10	7	4	39	27	37	3rd	Semifinal
2023	21	12	4	5	36	15	40	3rd	Runners-up
2024	28	15	8	5	47	31	53	2nd	Winners
2025	28	5	9	14	27	45	24	7th	Did not qualify
2026	28	20	2	6	61	24	62	1st	Runners-up
