= Icheon Daekyo WFC =

2002–2017 South Korean football club

Icheon Daekyo 이천 대교
- Full name: Icheon Daekyo Women's Football Club 이천 대교 여자축구단
- Founded: 2002; 24 years ago
- Dissolved: 2017; 9 years ago
- Ground: Icheon City Stadium
- Capacity: 20,305
Home colours	Away colours

Icheon Daekyo Women's Football Club (Korean: 이천 대교 여자축구단) was a South Korean women's football team based in Icheon, Gyeonggi-do. It was founded in 2002 and competed in the WK League, the top division of women's football in South Korea, from the league's inaugural season in 2009 until the team's disbandment in 2017.

== History ==
In August 2002, Daekyo announced the foundation of a new women's football team, with Choi Chu-kyung appointed as manager. The team was formally established under the name Daekyo Kangaroos in November 2002.

In 2008, when the Korean Women's Football Federation announced a pilot scheme for a new women's league, Daekyo were one of the four teams to participate. The following year they were one of six teams to compete in the first edition of the WK League, playing in the league's opening match against Incheon Hyundai Steel. They went on to become the first league champions, beating Hyundai Steel 2–0 over two legs in the championship final. Daekyo won the championship on two further occasions, in 2011 and 2012.

In January 2010, the team signed an agreement with the Goyang City government, establishing the city as their home base for the next five years and changing their full name to Goyang Daekyo Noonnoppi WFC. They changed their name to Icheon Daekyo when they moved to Icheon ahead of the 2015 season, following an agreement with the Icheon City Government to be based in the city for five years.

Icheon Daekyo ceased operations at the end of 2017.

== Honours ==
- WK League
  - Winners (3): 2009, 2011, 2012
  - Runners-up (3): 2014, 2015, 2016
- National Women's Football Championship
  - Winners (5): 2003, 2005, 2006, 2007, 2013
  - Runners-up (1): 2004

== Season-by-season records ==
Season	WK League regular season								Playoffs
Season	P	W	D	L	GF	GA	Pts	Pos.	Playoffs
2009	20	15	3	2	38	13	48	1st	Winners
2010	20	12	2	6	37	17	38	3rd	Did not qualify
2011	21	19	1	1	64	16	58	1st	Winners
2012	21	17	2	2	54	11	53	1st	Winners
2013	24	10	9	5	31	20	39	3rd	Semifinal
2014	24	12	10	2	34	20	46	2nd	Runners-up
2015	24	12	7	5	43	23	43	2nd	Runners-up
2016	24	16	5	3	46	20	53	2nd	Runners-up
2017	28	16	5	7	51	34	53	3rd	Semifinal
