= Incheon Hyundai Steel Red Angels WFC =

- Full name: Incheon Hyundai Steel Red Angels Women's Football Club
- Nickname: Red Angels
- Founded: 1993; 33 years ago
- Ground: Incheon Namdong Asiad Rugby Field
- Capacity: 4,968
- Owner: Hyundai Steel
- Manager: Hur Jeong-jae
- League: WK League
- 2026: WK League, 7th of 8
- Website: redangels.hyundai-steel.com
Home colours	Away colours

Incheon Hyundai Steel Red Angels WFC (Korean: 인천 현대제철 레드엔젤스 WFC) is a South Korean women's football team based in Incheon. The club was founded in 1993.

They are South Korea's most successful club with eleven consecutive WK League titles won from 2013 to 2023.

== History ==
=== Foundation and early years ===
In the 1990s, the Hyundai Group established and invested in various sports teams to improve the company's image following its founder Chung Ju-yung's unsuccessful campaign in the 1992 presidential election, as well as to boost employees' morale and loyalty. Hyundai's women's football club was formally established on 3 December 1993, becoming the first women's works football team in South Korea. Byun Byung-joo was appointed as manager and the squad initially consisted of fifteen players, including five former field hockey players. With no other works teams to compete with, they initially played against university and high school teams.

=== WK League dominance ===
Hyundai Steel were one of the founding members of the WK League when it was launched in 2009. In the inaugural edition, the club finished the season as runners-up, after losing in the championship final to Daekyo Kangaroos. In the following three seasons, Incheon again faced disappointment on the final day of the season as they made it to the final but lost on aggregate each time.

The Red Angels finally won their first league title in 2013, beating Seoul City 4–2 on aggregate after recording a draw in the first leg of the final. This began an era of WK League dominance for the club, as they went on to win eleven consecutive titles. In 2018, their league title earned them a place in the 2019 AFC Women's Club Championship, a pilot competition for the AFC Women's Champions League. The competition was held in Yongin, South Korea and Incheon finished in third place among four teams in the round-robin tournament.

Following Incheon's 2022 WK League title, they qualified for the 2023 AFC Women's Club Championship, an expanded version of the pilot competition with eight teams from across the region participating. The Red Angels won Group B to advance to the final against Urawa Red Diamonds, ultimately finishing as runners-up.

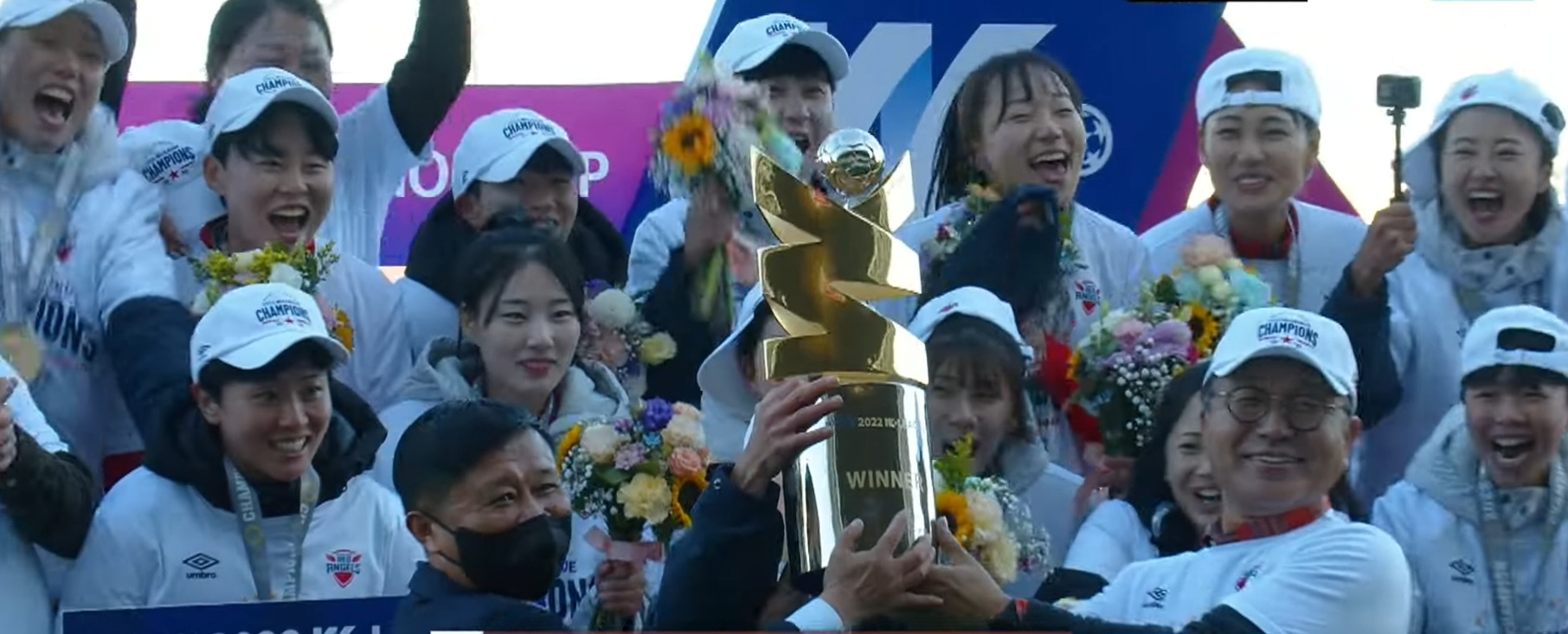
Incheon Hyudai Steel Red Angels players lifting the 2022 WK League trophy.

=== The winning streak ends ===
The club's WK League winning streak came to an end in 2024 when Incheon finished in fourth place in the league, failing to qualify for the championship playoff for the first time in league history. Despite disappointing results in the league, as defending champions Incheon were also competing in the 2024–25 AFC Women's Champions League, winning Group A in October 2024.

Under new manager Hur Jung-jae, Incheon had a slow start to the 2025 WK League season, with several matches postponed due to their continental fixtures. In the Champions League, the club hosted Bam Khatoon in the quarter-finals in March, beating the Iranian team 1–0. The semi-finals and final took place in Wuhan, China, and Incheon travelled to the final stage of the tournament with high hopes of overall victory. However, their Champions League title hopes were brought to a dramatic end in the semi-final in which they were beaten by Melbourne City, with the only goal of the match scored in second-half injury time. In the domestic league, Incheon finished the season in third place but were absent from the championship final for the second consecutive year as they failed to beat Seoul City in the playoff.

== Current squad ==
As of 10 April 2026

Note: Flags indicate national team as defined under FIFA eligibility rules; some limited exceptions apply. Players may hold more than one non-FIFA nationality.

No.	Pos.	Nation	Player
1	GK	KOR	Cho Eo-jin
4	DF	KOR	Maeng Da-hee
5	DF	KOR	Ko Yoo-jin
6	MF	KOR	Jung Yoo-jin
7	MF	KOR	Park Hye-jeong
8	MF	KOR	Kim Soo-jin
9	FW	KOR	Kang Ji-woo
10	FW	KOR	Jang Yoo-bin
11	FW	KOR	Park Ah-yeon
13	GK	KOR	Sung Seoul-seorabeol
14	MF	KOR	Kim Min-seo
15	DF	KOR	Moon Ha-yeon
16	MF	KOR	Kim Myeong-jin

No.	Pos.	Nation	Player
17	FW	KOR	Cho Mi-jin
18	FW	KOR	Park Mid-eum
19	DF	KOR	Yoon Hye-in
20	DF	KOR	Lim Hee-eun
21	FW	KOR	Hong Chae-bin
22	DF	KOR	Kim Eun-sol
23	DF	KOR	An Song-hee
27	MF	KOR	Namgung Ye-ji
29	FW	ENG	Fiona Worts
30	FW	KOR	Chun Ga-ram
32	FW	JPN	Yuka Toriumi
33	GK	KOR	Kim Min-jeong (captain)
46	MF	KOR	Bae Ye-bin

== Backroom staff ==
=== Coaching staff ===
- Manager: (South Korea) Hur Jeong-jae
- Head coach: (South Korea) Kim Eun-jeong
- Goalkeeper coach: (South Korea) Jo Jung-min
- Coach: (South Korea) Kim Chang-hee

=== Support staff ===
- Medical trainers: (South Korea) Kim Kyung-mi, (South Korea) Kim Ju-hyun
- Analyst: (South Korea) Lee Ju-han

Source: Official website

== Honours ==
=== Domestic ===
- Queen's National Women's Football Championship
  - Winners (8): 1998, 1999, 2000, 2003, 2004, 2005, 2006, 2007
  - Runners-up (4): 1995, 1996, 1997, 2001
- President's Cup (Women's Division)
  - Winners (5): 1996, 1998, 1999, 2001, 2002
  - Runners-up (1): 2000
- Korea Expressway Corporation National Women's Football Tournament
  - Winners (5): 1996, 1998, 1999, 2000, 2001
  - Runners-up (1): 1997
- National Women's Football Championship
  - Winners (7): 2004, 2008, 2012, 2015, 2016, 2021, 2024
  - Runners-up (6): 2002, 2003, 2005, 2011, 2017, 2022
- Peace Cup National Women's Football Tournament
  - Winners (1): 2005
- WK League
  - Winners (11): 2013, 2014, 2015, 2016, 2017, 2018, 2019, 2020, 2021, 2022, 2023
  - Runners-up (4): 2009, 2010, 2011, 2012

=== International ===
- AFC Women's Club Championship
  - Runners-up (1): 2023

== Season-by-season records ==
=== Pre-WK League era ===
Season	Queen's National Women's Football Championship	President's Cup	National Football Championship (Women's division)	Korea Expressway Corporation National Women's Football Tournament	Korean Women's League		Unification Cup	National Sports Festival
Season	Queen's National Women's Football Championship	President's Cup	National Football Championship (Women's division)	Korea Expressway Corporation National Women's Football Tournament	1st ed.	2nd ed.	Unification Cup	National Sports Festival
1994	3rd	3rd						(Note: Before 2001, the National Sports Festival did not feature a senior women's football tournament.)
1995	2nd		3rd					(Note: Before 2001, the National Sports Festival did not feature a senior women's football tournament.)
1996	2nd	1st	(Note: The tournament only featured a women's division once, in 1995.)	1st				(Note: Before 2001, the National Sports Festival did not feature a senior women's football tournament.)
1997	2nd	3rd	(Note: The tournament only featured a women's division once, in 1995.)	2nd				(Note: Before 2001, the National Sports Festival did not feature a senior women's football tournament.)
1998	1st	1st	(Note: The tournament only featured a women's division once, in 1995.)	1st	2nd	1st		(Note: Before 2001, the National Sports Festival did not feature a senior women's football tournament.)
1999	1st	1st	(Note: The tournament only featured a women's division once, in 1995.)	1st	1st	1st		(Note: Before 2001, the National Sports Festival did not feature a senior women's football tournament.)
2000	1st	2nd	(Note: The tournament only featured a women's division once, in 1995.)	1st	2nd			(Note: Before 2001, the National Sports Festival did not feature a senior women's football tournament.)
2001	2nd	1st	(Note: The tournament only featured a women's division once, in 1995.)	1st	2nd			1st
Season	Queen's National Women's Football Championship	President's Cup	National Football Championship (Women's division)	National Women's Football Championship	Korea Women's Football Championship		Unification Cup	National Sports Festival
Season	Queen's National Women's Football Championship	President's Cup	National Football Championship (Women's division)	National Women's Football Championship	Spring	Autumn	Unification Cup	National Sports Festival
2002		1st		2nd	2nd	2nd	1st	1st
2003	1st	(Note: The President's Cup did not have a women's division after 2002.)		2nd	1st		1st	1st
2004	1st	(Note: The President's Cup did not have a women's division after 2002.)		1st	1st	1st	2nd	2nd
2005	1st	(Note: The President's Cup did not have a women's division after 2002.)		2nd	1st	1st	1st	Unranked
2006	1st	(Note: The President's Cup did not have a women's division after 2002.)		3rd	1st	1st	1st	Quarter-finals
2007	1st	(Note: The President's Cup did not have a women's division after 2002.)					2nd	Semi-finals
2008	(Note: The tournament did not have a senior division after 2007.)	(Note: The President's Cup did not have a women's division after 2002.)		1st	2nd	2nd	2nd	Quarter-finals

=== WK League era ===
Season	WK League									National Women's Football Championship	National Sports Festival	Ref.
Season	P	W	D	L	GF	GA	Pts	Pos	Playoffs	National Women's Football Championship	National Sports Festival	Ref.
2009	20	9	8	3	25	7	35	2nd	Runners-up		1st	
2010	20	13	2	5	32	21	41	1st	Runners-up		Semi-finals	
2011	21	12	5	4	37	18	41	2nd	Runners-up	2nd	Semi-finals	
2012	21	16	2	3	43	17	50	2nd	Runners-up	1st	1st	
2013	24	15	5	4	44	15	50	1st	Winners	Unranked	Unranked	
2014	24	16	5	3	49	14	53	1st	Winners	Unranked	1st	
2015	24	19	4	1	57	16	61	1st	Winners	1st	Semi-finals	
2016	24	16	7	1	55	21	55	1st	Winners	1st	Semi-finals	
2017	28	22	4	2	88	18	70	1st	Winners	2nd	1st	
2018	28	21	6	1	84	21	69	1st	Winners	Unranked	1st	
2019	28	24	4	0	82	19	76	1st	Winners	Unranked	Semi-finals	
2020	21	18	1	2	60	11	55	1st	Winners	Not held (Note: The tournament was not held in 2020 due to the COVID-19 pandemic in South Korea.)	Cancelled (Note: Cancelled due to the COVID-19 pandemic in South Korea.)	
2021	21	17	1	3	51	14	52	1st	Winners	1st	Cancelled (Note: Cancelled due to the COVID-19 pandemic in South Korea.)	
2022	21	16	4	1	44	13	52	1st	Winners	2nd	Unranked	
2023	21	13	3	5	36	14	42	1st	Winners	Semi-finals	2nd	
2024	28	12	11	5	36	25	47	4th	Did not qualify	1st	2nd	
2025	28	13	9	6	35	26	48	3rd	Semifinal	Group stage		
2026	28	7	6	15	23	42	27	7th	Did not qualify			

=== Record in AFC Women's Club Championship ===
All results list Red Angels's goal tally first.

Season	Round	Opponents	Result	Placement
2019	Group stage	(Australia) Melbourne Victory	4–0	Third place
2019	Group stage	(Japan) Nippon TV Beleza	0–2	Third place
2019	Group stage	(China) Jiangsu Suning	0–2	Third place
2023	Group stage	(Uzbekistan) FC Nasaf	2–0	First place
2023	Group stage	(Iran) Bam Khatoon	2–1	First place
2023	Group stage	(Australia) Sydney FC	3–0	First place
2023	Final	(Japan) Urawa Red Diamonds	1–2	

== Managers ==
No.	Manager	Period	Ref.
1	(South Korea) Byun Byung-joo	1993–1995	
2	(South Korea) Kim Pyung-seok	1996–1998	
3	(South Korea) An Jong-goan	1999–2009	
4	(South Korea) Lee Moon-seok	2010–2011	
5	(South Korea) Choi In-cheol	2012–2019	
6	(South Korea) Jung Sung-chun	2020–2021	
C	(South Korea) Kim Eun-sook	2021	
7	(South Korea) Kim Eun-sook	2022–2024	
8	(South Korea) Hur Jeong-jae	2025–present	
