= Kim Jung-mi (footballer) =

South Korean footballer (born 1984)

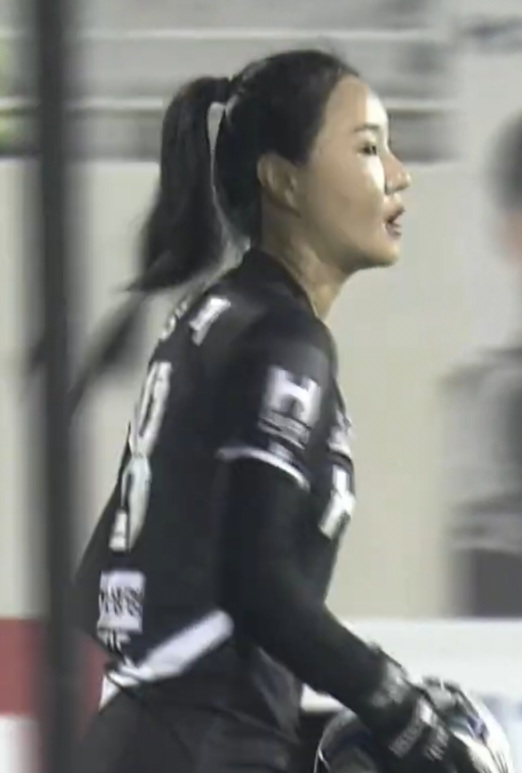

Personal information
- Date of birth: 16 October 1984 (age 42)
- Place of birth: South Korea
- Height: 1.78 m (5 ft 10 in)
- Position: Goalkeeper

Team information
- Current team: Seoul City Hall
- Number: 18

Youth career
- Yeungjin College

Senior career*
Years	Team	Apps	(Gls)
2004–2025	Hyundai Steel Red Angels		
2026–	Seoul City Hall		

International career
2003–2024	South Korea	152	(0)
- * Club domestic league appearances and goals

- Kim Jung-mi
- Hangul: 김정미
- RR: Gim Jeongmi
- MR: Kim Chŏngmi

Kim Jung-mi (Korean: 김정미; Korean pronunciation: [kim.dʑʌŋ.mi] or [kim] [tɕʌŋ.mi]; born 16 October 1984) is a South Korean footballer who plays as a goalkeeper for WK League club Seoul City Hall.

== Club career ==
Kim joined INI Steel in 2004 and remained at the club for 21 years until her departure in 2025. In 2024, she became the first ever goalkeeper to make 300 WK League appearances.

== International career ==
Having made her international debut at the 2003 AFC Women's Championship, Kim played for South Korea at the 2003 FIFA Women's World Cup.

Kim participated at the 2015 FIFA Women's World Cup in Canada. At the tournament, she drew attention for her resilience as she continued to play despite an injury to her cheekbone. She was named best goalkeeper at the 2015 EAFF Women's East Asian Cup, where South Korea finished as runners-up.

Kim missed the 2019 World Cup due to an achilles tendon injury, but returned to the national team squad for the 2023 iteration of the tournament.

== Honours ==
Incheon Hyundai Steel Red Angels

- WK League: 2013, 2014, 2015, 2016, 2017, 2018, 2019, 2020, 2021, 2022, 2023
- National Women's Football Championship: 2004, 2008, 2012, 2015, 2016, 2021, 2024
- Queen's Cup: 2004, 2005, 2006, 2007
- AFC Women's Club Championship runner-up: 2023

South Korea

- EAFF Women's East Asian Cup: 2005

Individual

- Korea Football Association Women's Player of the Year: 2016
