= Lee Min-a =

South Korean footballer (born 1991)

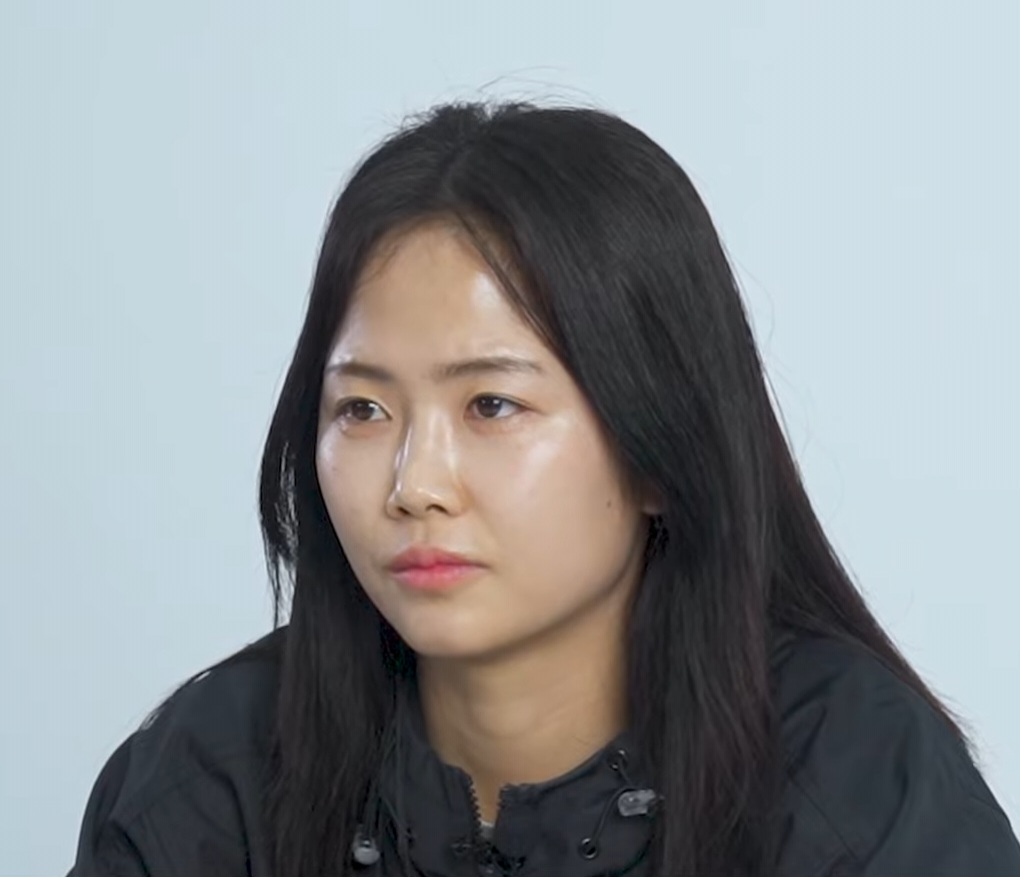
- Lee in 2021

Personal information
- Date of birth: 8 November 1991 (age 35)
- Place of birth: Daegu, South Korea
- Height: 1.62 m (5 ft 4 in)
- Position: Midfielder

Team information
- Current team: Ottawa Rapid
- Number: 14

Youth career
- 2010–2012: Yeungjin College

Senior career*
Years	Team	Apps	(Gls)
2012–2017	Incheon Red Angels		
2018–2019	INAC Kobe Leonessa	17	(5)
2020–2024	Hyundai Steel Red Angels		
2025–	Ottawa Rapid	45	(5)

International career^{‡}
2008	South Korea U17	4	(0)
2010	South Korea U20	7	(0)
2012–	South Korea	83	(17)
- * Club domestic league appearances and goals as of 30 October 2026 ‡ National team caps and goals as of 13 January 2025

- Lee Min-a
- Hangul: 이민아
- RR: I Mina
- MR: I Mina

Lee Min-a (born 8 November 1991) is a South Korean footballer who plays as a midfielder for Canadian Northern Super League club Ottawa Rapid and the South Korea national team.

In 2017, Lee was named KFA Women's Player of the Year.

== Club career ==
=== Incheon Hyundai Steel Red Angels ===
After playing for Yeungjin College from 2010 to 2012, Lee joined Incheon Hyundai Steel Red Angels in the WK League. In 2015, she scored 6 goals and recorded 5 assists in 26 appearances. In 2016, she scored 7 goals and provided 1 assist in 23 appearances. In 2017, she finished the season with 14 goals and 10 assists in 28 appearances. Between 2013 and 2017, Lee won 5 straight WK League titles.

=== INAC Kobe Leonessa ===
In December 2017, Lee joined Nadeshiko League club INAC Kobe Leonessa. On 21 March 2018, she made her debut in a 2–0 home victory against Nippon Sport Science University Fields Yokohama. On 24 September 2018, she scored a brace in a 5–1 win over Mynavi Vegalta Sendai.

=== Ottawa Rapid ===
On 23 February 2025, Lee signed with Ottawa Rapid in the newly launched Northern Super League. On 27 April, she scored the first-ever goal in franchise history, in a 2–1 victory over AFC Toronto. At the end of the 2025 regular season, Lee was included in the Northern Super League's team of the year. In March 2026, she signed a contract extension with the Rapid for the 2026 season.

== International career ==
Lee was part of the South Korea under-20 team that finished third at the 2010 FIFA U-20 Women's World Cup. On 15 February 2012, she made her debut for the senior team in a 1–0 loss to North Korea. On 21 January 2016, she scored her first goal in a 5–0 win over Vietnam in the 2016 Four Nations Tournament in Shenzhen.

== Career statistics ==
=== International ===
As of 3 December 2024.

Appearances and goals by national team and year
National team	Year	Apps	Goals
South Korea	2012	7	0
South Korea	2013	6	0
South Korea	2015	4	0
South Korea	2016	13	5
South Korea	2017	8	1
South Korea	2018	13	8
South Korea	2019	9	0
South Korea	2021	5	1
South Korea	2022	11	2
South Korea	2023	3	0
South Korea	2024	4	0
Total		83	17

Scores and results list South Korea's goal tally first, score column indicates score after each Lee goal.

List of international goals scored by Lee Min-a
No.	Date	Venue	Opponent	Score	Result	Competition
1	21 January 2016	Shenzhen Stadium, Shenzhen, China	Vietnam	1–0	5–0	2016 Four Nations Tournament
2	8 November 2016	Hong Kong Football Club Stadium, Hong Kong	Guam	6–0	13–0	2017 EAFF E-1 Football Championship
3	8 November 2016	Hong Kong Football Club Stadium, Hong Kong	Guam	12–0	13–0	2017 EAFF E-1 Football Championship
4	11 November 2016	Hong Kong Football Club Stadium, Hong Kong	Hong Kong	3–0	14–0	2017 EAFF E-1 Football Championship
5	14 November 2016	Hong Kong Football Club Stadium, Hong Kong	Chinese Taipei	1–0	9–0	2017 EAFF E-1 Football Championship
6	5 April 2017	Kim Il-sung Stadium, Pyongyang, North Korea	India	2–0	10–0	2018 AFC Women's Asian Cup qualification
7	28 February 2018	Albufeira Municipal Stadium, Albufeira, Portugal	Russia	1–0	3–1	2018 Algarve Cup
8	6 March 2018	Bela Vista Municipal Stadium, Parchal, Portugal	Sweden	1–1	1–1	2018 Algarve Cup
9	13 April 2018	King Abdullah II Stadium, Amman, Jordan	Vietnam	3–0	4–0	2018 AFC Women's Asian Cup
10	13 April 2018	King Abdullah II Stadium, Amman, Jordan	Vietnam	4–0	4–0	2018 AFC Women's Asian Cup
11	16 April 2018	Amman International Stadium, Amman, Jordan	Philippines	2–0	5–0	2018 AFC Women's Asian Cup
12	24 August 2018	Gelora Sriwijaya Stadium, Palembang, Indonesia	Hong Kong	5–0	5–0	2018 Asian Games
13	28 August 2018	Gelora Sriwijaya Stadium, Palembang, Indonesia	Japan	1–1	1–2	2018 Asian Games
14	31 August 2018	Gelora Sriwijaya Stadium, Palembang, Indonesia	Chinese Taipei	3–0	4–0	2018 Asian Games
15	17 September 2021	Pakhtakor Stadium, Tashkent, Uzbekistan	Mongolia	4–0	12–0	2022 AFC Women's Asian Cup qualification
16	26 July 2022	Kashima Soccer Stadium, Kashima, Japan	Chinese Taipei	3–0	4–0	2022 EAFF E-1 Football Championship
17	12 November 2022	Orangetheory Stadium, Christchurch, New Zealand	New Zealand	1–0	1–0	Friendly

== Honours ==
Incheon Hyundai Steel Red Angels

- WK League: 2013, 2014, 2015, 2016, 2017, 2020, 2021, 2022, 2023

Individual

- KFA Footballer of the Year: 2017
