= Jeon Eun-ha =

South Korean footballer (born 1993)

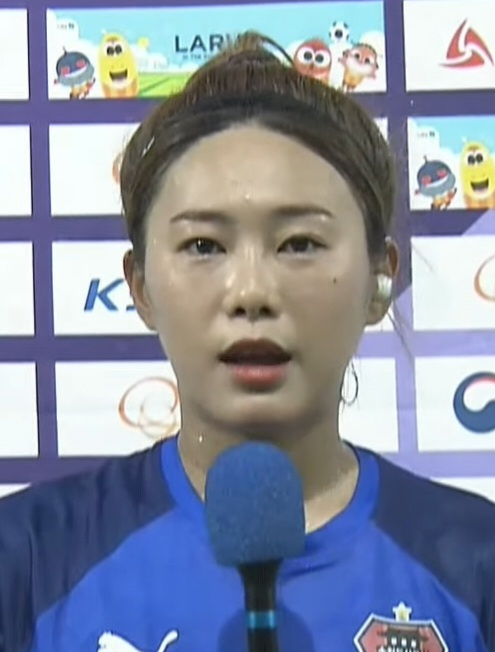

Personal information
- Date of birth: 28 January 1993 (age 33)
- Place of birth: Yeongdeok County, South Korea
- Height: 1.64 m (5 ft 5 in)
- Positions: Forward; midfielder

Team information
- Current team: Gyeongju KHNP
- Number: 14

Youth career
- 2008–2010: Pohang Girls' Electronic High School
- 2011–2012: Gangwon State University

Senior career*
Years	Team	Apps	(Gls)
2013–2014	Jeonbuk KSPO		
2015	Gumi Sportstoto		
2016–2018	Incheon Hyundai		
2019–2020	Gyeongju KHNP		
2021–2024	Suwon FC		
2025–	Gyeongju KHNP		

International career
2008–2009	South Korea U17	4	(0)
2010–2012	South Korea U20	15	(4)
2013–2024	South Korea	26	(1)
- * Club domestic league appearances and goals

- Jeon Eun-ha
- Hangul: 전은하
- RR: Jeon Eunha
- MR: Chŏn Ŭnha

Jeon Eun-ha (Korean: 전은하; Korean pronunciation: [tɕʌ.nɯn.ɦa] or [tɕʌn] [ɯn.ɦa]; born 28 January 1993) is a South Korean footballer who plays for the WK League side Gyeongju KHNP. She made her international debut for the South Korea women's national team in 2013, and earned a total of 26 caps.

Jeon scored four goals at the 2012 FIFA U-20 Women's World Cup. In 2012, she was awarded women's footballer of the year by the Korea Football Association.

== Early life ==
Jeon was born in Yeongdeok County in North Gyeongsang. Her father, a former footballer, was the coach of a local middle school football team and she began playing football under his guidance in the fourth grade of elementary school.

== Youth career ==
At U-18 level she played for Pohang Girls' Electronic High School in nearby Pohang. She played a key role in the school's victory at the 2009 National Women's Football Championship, their second consecutive title at that tournament. While still at high school, she played at the 2010 FIFA U-20 Women's World Cup, and was awarded a plaque by the mayor of Pohang in recognition of her achievements.

She went on to play for Gangwon State University, leading the side as captain to their first ever tournament victory at the 2012 KWFF Spring Championship, where she was also named tournament MVP. Gangwon State also won the KWFF Fall Championship in the same year. Having made an impression with her strong performance for the national team at the 2012 U-20 Women's World Cup, Jeon won the prestigious Korea Football Association Women's Player of the Year award in 2012.

== Club career ==
Owing to her successful youth career and involvement with South Korea's national youth teams, Jeon was tipped as one of the most sought-after players in the 2013 WK League draft. She was signed in the first round of the draft and fifth place overall by Jeonbuk KSPO. She made her league debut in the team's first match of the 2013 season against Icheon Daekyo.

After two years with KSPO, Jeon transferred to Daejeon Sportstoto ahead of the 2015 WK League season. She only spent one season with the club before moving again, this time to Incheon Hyundai Steel Red Angels. Having won three league titles with Incheon, Jeon left the club upon expiration of her contract at the end of the 2018 WK League season. From there, she joined Gyeongju KHNP. She played a key role in Gyeongju's challenge for the WK League title in 2020, which saw them progress to the championship final but ultimately finish as runners-up to Incheon.

Jeon was part of the Suwon FC side that won the WK League title in 2024, scoring a goal in the second leg of the championship final. She returned to Gyeongju KHNP in 2025, making the move from Suwon together with teammates Moon Mi-ra and Kim Yun-ji. In 2026, Jeon was named as one of KHNP's vice-captains.

== International career ==
=== Youth ===
Jeon played for South Korea at the 2008 FIFA U-17 Women's World Cup in New Zealand, where she appeared in the team's group stage match against England and the quarter final against the United States. She went on to play for the South Korea U20 side at the 2010 FIFA U-20 Women's World Cup as one of the youngest members of the squad, playing in every match as the team became the first South Korean national team to finish third in a FIFA tournament. At the 2012 edition of the same tournament, Jeon was considered one of the stars of South Korea's squad, scoring three goals in the group stage and another in the side's quarter-final defeat to Japan.

=== Senior ===
Jeon was called up to South Korea's senior side in January 2013 for a friendly tournament in China. She became a regular member of the squad, playing nine international matches in 2013. However, Jeon was then absent from the national team for over six years, until she made her return to international football under then-manager Colin Bell at the 2019 EAFF E-1 Football Championship. She was selected to play in qualifiers for the 2022 AFC Women's Asian Cup but had to withdraw due to injury.

Having made a full recovery, Jeon was part of South Korea's squad at the 2023 FIFA Women's World Cup, her first senior World Cup. She made one appearance at the tournament, coming on as a second-half substitute in South Korea's 1–0 defeat to Morocco. Later in 2023, Jeon played at the postponed 2022 Asian Games, where she scored her first senior international goal in South Korea's opening match against Myanmar. Having made a handful of appearances throughout 2024, Jeon was set to feature in a pair of friendly matches in 2025 but withdrew from the squad with an injury.

== Honours ==
Gangwon State University

- KWFF Spring Championship: 2012
- KWFF Fall Championship: 2012

Incheon Hyundai Steel Red Angels

- WK League: 2016, 2017, 2018

Gyeongju KHNP

- WK League: 2026

Suwon FC

- WK League: 2024

South Korea U-20

- FIFA U-20 Women's World Cup third place: 2010

Individual

- KWFF Spring Championship university division MVP: 2012
- Korea Football Association Women's Player of the Year: 2012
