= 2022 WK League =

Thirteenth season of the top Korean women's association football league

WK League
- Season: 2022
- Dates: 2 April – 27 October 2022
- Champions: Incheon Hyundai Steel Red Angels (10th title)
- AFC Club Championship: Incheon Hyundai Steel Red Angels
- Matches: 84
- Goals: 251 (2.99 per match)
- Top goalscorer: Moon Mi-ra; Choe Yu-ri (10 goals each)
- Biggest home win: Hwacheon 4–0 Changnyeong
- Biggest away win: Sejong 1–6 Gyeongju
- Highest scoring: Seoul 3–5 Gyeongju
- Longest unbeaten run: 11 matches Incheon
- Longest winless run: 12 matches Sejong
- (Note: All statistics do not include play-off matches)

The 2022 WK League was the 14th season of the WK League, the top division of women's football in South Korea. The regular season ran from 2 April to 27 October 2022, and the play-offs from 4 to 26 November 2022. The total number of rounds has been reduced from 28 to 21 due to the 2022 FIFA U-20 Women's World Cup and the 2022 Asian Games.

Suwon UDC was renamed Suwon FC Women after being affiliated with Suwon FC, and attracted attention with the signing of Ji So-yun, who is widely considered one of the greatest players in South Korean women's football.

== Teams ==
=== Stadiums and locations ===
Locations of the 2022 WK League teams

Team	City	Stadium	Capacity	Position in 2021
Boeun Sangmu	Boeun	Boeun Public Stadium	6,000	6th place
Changnyeong WFC	Changnyeong	Changnyeong Sports Park	2,500	8th place
Gyeongju KHNP	Gyeongju	Gyeongju Football Park	650	Runners-up
Hwacheon KSPO	Hwacheon	Hwacheon Sports Park	3,000	5th place
Incheon Hyundai Steel Red Angels	Incheon	Incheon Namdong Asiad Rugby Field	5,078	Champions
Sejong Sportstoto	Sejong	Sejong Central Park	1,000	7th place
Seoul WFC	Seoul	Seoul World Cup Auxiliary Stadium	1,012	4th place
Suwon FC	Suwon	Suwon Sports Complex (Note: At Suwon Sports Complex, Suwon FC used the auxiliary stadium in April and May, and the main stadium from June.)	11,808	3rd place

=== Foreign players ===
The total number of foreign players was restricted to three per club, including a slot for a player from the Asian Football Confederation countries. Boeun Sangmu were not allowed to sign any foreign players due to their military status.

Club	Player 1	Player 2	AFC player
Changnyeong WFC	(Ivory Coast) Ines Nrehy	(Japan) Nanase Kiryu	(Japan) Sawako Yasumoto
Gyeongju KHNP	(Ivory Coast) Josée Nahi	(Nigeria) Chinaza Uchendu	(Japan) Asuna Tanaka
Hwacheon KSPO			(Japan) Natsuki Yoshimi
Incheon Hyundai Steel Red Angels	(Kenya) Tereza Engesha		
Sejong Sportstoto	(South Africa) Hildah Magaia	(Brazil) Neném	(Japan) Naoko Sakuramoto
Seoul WFC			
Suwon FC			(Japan) Mebae Tanaka

== Regular season ==
=== League table ===
Pos	Team	Pld	W	D	L	GF	GA	GD	Pts	Qualification
1	Incheon Hyundai Steel Red Angels	21	16	4	1	44	13	+31	52	Qualification for play-offs final
2	Gyeongju KHNP	21	15	4	2	46	21	+25	49	Qualification for play-offs semi-final
3	Suwon FC	21	10	7	4	39	27	+12	37	Qualification for play-offs semi-final
4	Hwacheon KSPO	21	9	7	5	36	25	+11	34	
5	Seoul WFC	21	6	4	11	32	43	−11	22	
6	Boeun Sangmu	21	4	4	13	16	35	−19	16	
7	Changnyeong WFC	21	5	1	15	20	42	−22	16	
8	Sejong Sportstoto	21	2	3	16	18	45	−27	9	

Source: Soccerway

=== Results ===
==== Matches 1–14 ====
Home \ Away	BOE	CHA	GYE	HWA	INC	SEJ	SEO	SUW
Boeun Sangmu	—	0–2	1–3	0–1	0–2	1–1	2–4	1–3
Changnyeong WFC	2–1	—	0–1	1–2	0–2	1–0	2–1	0–3
Gyeongju KHNP	3–0	3–1	—	1–1	0–2	3–2	4–2	1–1
Hwacheon KSPO	3–0	5–2	1–2	—	1–1	1–0	1–1	2–2
Incheon Hyundai Steel Red Angels	2–0	3–0	1–3	2–1	—	2–1	5–2	2–0
Sejong Sportstoto	0–3	0–2	1–6	0–1	0–3	—	2–0	1–2
Seoul WFC	1–1	1–0	1–2	1–1	0–1	1–1	—	1–2
Suwon FC	2–0	3–1	0–2	1–1	2–2	2–1	2–3	—

Source: Soccerway
Legend: Blue = home team win; Yellow = draw; Red = away team win.

==== Matches 15–21 ====
Home \ Away	BOE	CHA	GYE	HWA	INC	SEJ	SEO	SUW
Boeun Sangmu	—	1–0		0–1			2–1	
Changnyeong WFC		—	0–2		1–3		2–3	
Gyeongju KHNP	1–1		—			2–1		1–0
Hwacheon KSPO		4–0	1–1	—	0–2			2–4
Incheon Hyundai Steel Red Angels	0–0		1–0		—	3–0		2–2
Sejong Sportstoto	0–2	2–1		2–5		—		1–1
Seoul WFC			3–5	2–1	0–3	3–2	—	
Suwon FC	3–0	2–2					2–1	—

Source: Soccerway
Legend: Blue = home team win; Yellow = draw; Red = away team win.

== Statistics ==
=== Top scorers ===
Rank	Player	Club	Goals
1	(South Korea) Moon Mi-ra	Suwon FC	10
1	(South Korea) Choe Yu-ri	Incheon Hyundai Steel Red Angels	10
3	(South Korea) Lee Soo-bin	Hwacheon KSPO	8
3	(South Korea) Seo Ji-yeon	Gyeongju KHNP	8
5	(South Korea) Kang Chae-rim	Incheon Hyundai Steel Red Angels	7
5	(Ivory Coast) Ines Nrehy	Changnyeong WFC	7
5	(South Korea) Choi Ji-na	Hwacheon KSPO	7
5	(South Korea) Lee Jeong-min	Boeun Sangmu	7

== Championship play-offs ==
=== Bracket ===
Semi-final			Final
			1	Incheon Hyundai Steel Red Angels	0	2	2
2	Gyeongju KHNP	4		Gyeongju KHNP	0	0	0
3	Suwon FC	3

=== Semi-final ===
4 November 2022
18:00 UTC+9

Gyeongju KHNP	4–3	Suwon FC
Lee Si-ho 4'; Hyun Seul-gi 19'; Seo Ji-yeon 22'; Nahi 73'		Kim Yun-ji 41'; Ji So-yun 45'; Tanaka 53'

Gyeongju Football Park, Gyeongju
Referee: Cha Min-ji

=== Final ===
19 November 2022
14:00 UTC+9

Gyeongju KHNP	0–0	Incheon Hyundai Steel Red Angels

Gyeongju Football Park, Gyeongju
Referee: Won Myung-hee

26 November 2022
14:00 UTC+9

Incheon Hyundai Steel Red Angels	2–0	Gyeongju KHNP
Lee Min-a 9'; Jung Seol-bin 17'

Incheon Namdong Asiad Rugby Field, Incheon
Referee: Oh Hyun-jung

Incheon Hyundai Steel Red Angels won 2–0 on aggregate.

=== Final table ===
Pos	Team	Qualification
1	Incheon Hyundai Steel Red Angels (C)	Qualification for AFC Club Championship
2	Gyeongju KHNP	
3	Suwon FC	

Source: RSSSF
(C) Champions
