= 2019 WK League =

WK League
- Season: 2019
- Dates: 15 April – 31 October 2019
- Champions: Incheon Hyundai Steel Red Angels (7th title)
- Matches: 112
- Goals: 345 (3.08 per match)
- Top goalscorer: Bia Zaneratto (16 goals)
- Biggest home win: Gyeongju 6–0 Changnyeong
- Biggest away win: Gumi 0–5 Incheon; Changnyeong 0–5 Hwacheon
- Longest winning run: 13 matches Incheon
- Longest unbeaten run: 28 matches Incheon
- Longest winless run: 14 matches Changnyeong
- Longest losing run: 5 matches Changnyeong
- Average attendance: 353
- (Note: All statistics do not include play-off matches)

The 2019 WK League was the eleventh season of the WK League, the top division of women's football in South Korea. The regular season began on 15 April and ended on 31 October 2019.

Incheon Hyundai Steel Red Angels won their seventh consecutive title.

== Teams ==
=== Stadiums and locations ===
Locations of the 2019 WK League teams

Team	City	Stadium	Capacity	Position in 2018
Boeun Sangmu	Boeun	Boeun Public Stadium	6,000	7th place
Changnyeong WFC	Changnyeong	Changnyeong Sports Park	2,500	8th place
Gumi Sportstoto	Gumi	Gumi Civic Stadium	35,000	4th place
Gyeongju KHNP	Gyeongju	Gyeongju Football Park	650	Runners-up
Hwacheon KSPO	Hwacheon	Hwacheon Sports Park	3,000	5th place
Incheon Hyundai Steel Red Angels	Incheon	Incheon Namdong Asiad Rugby Field	5,078	Champions
Seoul WFC	Seoul	Hyochang Stadium	15,194	6th place
Suwon UDC	Suwon	Suwon Sports Complex	11,808	3rd place

=== Foreign players ===
The total number of foreign players was restricted to three per club, including a slot for a player from the Asian Football Confederation countries.

Club	Player 1	Player 2	AFC player
Changnyeong WFC			
Gumi Sportstoto			
Gyeongju KHNP	(Ivory Coast) Josée Nahi	(Ivory Coast) Ines Nrehy	(Japan) Asuna Tanaka
Hwacheon KSPO	(Brazil) Luana	(Austria) Annelie Leitner	
Incheon Hyundai Steel Red Angels	(Brazil) Bia Zaneratto	(Brazil) Thaís Guedes	
Seoul City WFC			
Suwon UDC		(Japan) Madoka Haji	(Japan) Mayu Ikejiri

== Regular season ==
=== League table ===
Pos	Team	Pld	W	D	L	GF	GA	GD	Pts	Qualification
1	Incheon Hyundai Steel Red Angels (C)	28	24	4	0	82	19	+63	76	Qualification for playoffs final
2	Gyeongju KHNP	28	14	7	7	62	35	+27	49	Qualification for playoffs semi-final
3	Suwon UDC	28	13	10	5	52	42	+10	49	Qualification for playoffs semi-final
4	Hwacheon KSPO	28	12	8	8	49	39	+10	44	
5	Gumi Sportstoto	28	9	9	10	37	40	−3	36	
6	Boeun Sangmu	28	8	6	14	22	36	−14	30	
7	Seoul WFC	28	3	6	19	26	63	−37	15	
8	Changnyeong WFC	28	1	6	21	15	71	−56	9	

Source: Soccerway
(C) Champions

=== Results ===
==== Matches 1–14 ====
Home \ Away	BOE	CHA	GUM	GYE	HWA	INC	SEO	SUW
Boeun Sangmu	—	3–1	0–0	0–3	1–1	0–3	0–0	1–2
Changnyeong WFC	1–2	—	0–0	1–1	0–4	0–2	0–0	1–2
Gumi Sportstoto	1–2	4–0	—	0–4	0–0	0–5	3–0	1–1
Gyeongju KHNP	0–2	4–1	1–1	—	1–1	2–4	2–1	5–2
Hwacheon KSPO	2–1	3–1	5–1	1–1	—	0–2	3–0	1–1
Incheon Hyundai Steel Red Angels	5–1	3–0	3–1	2–1	5–3	—	3–0	3–1
Seoul WFC	0–2	2–1	1–2	0–3	3–3	1–2	—	1–2
Suwon UDC	3–0	4–0	2–1	2–2	1–1	1–1	3–2	—

Source: Soccerway KWFF
Legend: Blue = home team win; Yellow = draw; Red = away team win.

==== Matches 15–28 ====
Home \ Away	BOE	CHA	GUM	GYE	HWA	INC	SEO	SUW
Boeun Sangmu	—	1–0	1–1	0–2	0–1	0–1	2–0	0–2
Changnyeong WFC	0–0	—	1–3	1–4	0–5	0–4	0–0	3–4
Gumi Sportstoto	0–1	5–0	—	0–1	1–0	2–2	2–0	1–0
Gyeongju KHNP	1–0	6–0	2–2	—	2–3	0–4	4–0	0–2
Hwacheon KSPO	1–0	0–1	1–0	4–0	—	0–3	5–1	2–0
Incheon Hyundai Steel Red Angels	2–0	1–0	3–0	4–0	5–0	—	5–1	3–1
Seoul WFC	1–1	2–0	2–3	1–3	2–1	2–4	—	2–2
Suwon UDC	2–1	2–2	0–1	3–2	2–2	1–1	2–1	—

Source: Soccerway KWFF
Legend: Blue = home team win; Yellow = draw; Red = away team win.

== Championship playoffs ==
=== Bracket ===
Semi-final			Final
			1	Incheon Hyundai Steel Red Angels	0	1	1
2	Gyeongju KHNP	0		Suwon UDC	0	0	0
3	Suwon UDC	2

=== Semi-final ===
4 November 2019
19:00 UTC+9

Gyeongju KHNP	0–2	Suwon UDC
	Report	Kim Yun-ji 15'; Moon Mi-ra 71'

Gyeongju Football Park, Gyeongju

=== Final ===
7 November 2019
19:00 UTC+9

Suwon UDC	0–0	Incheon Hyundai Steel Red Angels
	Report

Suwon Sports Complex, Suwon

11 November 2019
19:00 UTC+9

Incheon Hyundai Steel Red Angels	1–0	Suwon UDC
Thaís Guedes 75'	Report

Namdong Asiad Rugby Field, Incheon

Incheon Hyundai Steel Red Angels won 1–0 on aggregate.
