= Hong Hye-ji =

South Korean footballer (born 1996)

Hong Hye-ji 홍혜지
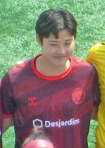
- Hong in 2025

Personal information
- Date of birth: 25 August 1996 (age 30)
- Place of birth: South Korea
- Height: 1.74 m (5 ft 9 in)
- Position: Defender

Team information
- Current team: Gyeongju KHNP
- Number: 23

College career
Years	Team	Apps	(Gls)
- Korea University

Senior career*
Years	Team	Apps	(Gls)
2017	INAC Kobe Leonessa	2	(0)
2018–2020	Changnyeong WFC		
2021–2024	Hyundai Steel Red Angels		
2025	AFC Toronto	6	(0)
2026–	Gyeongju KHNP		

International career^{‡}
2011	South Korea U17	2	(0)
2013–2016	South Korea U20	17	(0)
2015	South Korea Universiade	3	(1)
2015–	South Korea	43	(1)
- * Club domestic league appearances and goals as of 20 November 2026 ‡ National team caps and goals as of 15 December 2025

- Hong Hye-ji
- Hangul: 홍혜지
- RR: Hong Hyeji
- MR: Hong Hyeji

Hong Hye-ji (born 25 August 1996) is a South Korean footballer who plays as a defender for WK League club Gyeongju KHNP and the South Korea national team.

== Early life ==
Hong attended Hyundai Technical High School, followed by attending Korea University. At Korea University, she played for the women's football team.

== Club career ==
In December 2016, Hong signed a one-year contract with Japanese Nadeshiko League club INAC Kobe Leonessa for the 2017 season. At the end of the season, after having only made two appearances, she departed the club to enter the South Korean WK League draft.

In December 2017, she was selected first overall in the 2018 WK League Draft by Changnyeong WFC. She scored the winning goals that led to the team's first wins of the season in both the 2018 and 2019 season.

In 2021, she joined WK League club Incheon Hyundai Steel Red Angels. She won three consecutive WK League titles with the club, from 2021 to 2023.

In January 2025, she signed with Canadian club AFC Toronto in the Northern Super League. After one season with the side, Hong returned to the WK League, signing with Gyeongju KHNP.

== International career ==
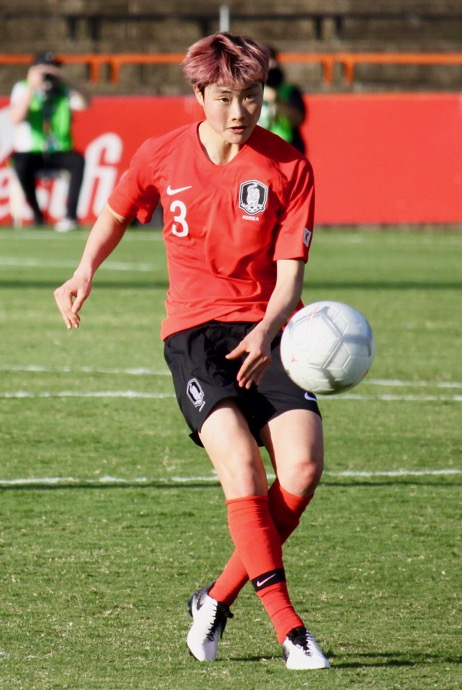
Hong playing for South Korea in 2019

Hong played with the South Korea U16 at the 2011 AFC U-16 Women's Championship.

She played with the South Korea U19 at the 2013 AFC U-19 Women's Championship and the 2015 AFC U-19 Women's Championship, helping them qualify for the 2014 FIFA U-20 Women's World Cup and the 2016 FIFA U-20 Women's World Cup. She served as captain at both the 2015 U19 AFC Championship and 2016 U20 World Cup.

On 29 November 2015, Hong made her senior debut in a 1–0 loss to Australia. In December 2015, she won the Korea Football Association Young Player of the Year Award. On 4 June 2016, she scored her first goal in a 5–0 victory against Myanmar. She was regularly called up to the senior team for several tournaments, but suffered an injury in April before the 2019 FIFA Women's World Cup, resulting in her not being selected to the squad.

== Career statistics ==
=== International ===
As of 15 December 2025

Appearances and goals by national team and year
National team	Year	Apps	Goals
South Korea	2015	1	0
South Korea	2016	3	1
South Korea	2017	4	0
South Korea	2018	8	0
South Korea	2019	6	0
South Korea	2020	2	0
South Korea	2021	8	0
South Korea	2022	3	0
South Korea	2023	5	0
South Korea	2024	1	0
South Korea	2025	2	0
Total		43	1

== Honours ==
Incheon Hyundai Steel Red Angels

- WK League: 2021, 2022, 2023

Gyeongju KHNP

- WK League: 2026

South Korea

- AFC U-19 Women's Championship: 2013

Individual

- KFA Young Player of the Year: 2015
