= Jung Seol-bin =

South Korean footballer

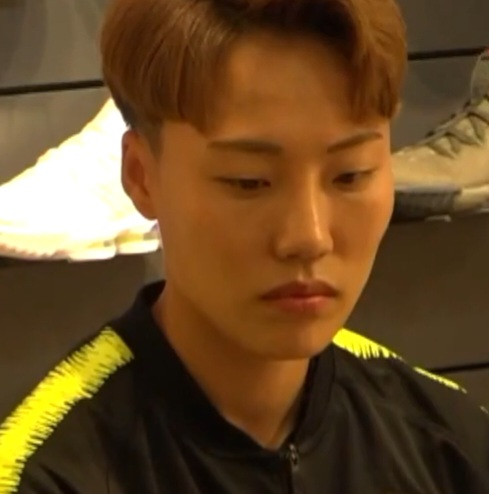

Personal information
- Date of birth: 6 January 1990 (age 36)
- Place of birth: South Korea
- Height: 1.65 m (5 ft 5 in)
- Position: Forward

Youth career
- Dongsan Information Industry High School
- Hanyang Women's University

Senior career*
Years	Team	Apps	(Gls)
2010–2023	Hyundai Steel Red Angels	36	(14)
2024–2025	Sejong Sportstoto	25	(2)

International career
2007–2010	South Korea U20	21	(9)
2006–2023	South Korea	84	(22)
Medal record
Asian Games
Bronze medal – third place	2014 Incheon	Team
- * Club domestic league appearances and goals

- Jung Seol-bin
- Hangul: 정설빈
- RR: Jeong Seolbin
- MR: Chŏng Sŏlbin

Former name
- Hangul: 정혜인
- RR: Jeong Hyein
- MR: Chŏng Hyein

Jung Seol-bin (Korean pronunciation: [tɕʌŋ.sʌl.bin]), formerly Jung Hye-in (born 6 January 1990), is a retired South Korean footballer who played as a forward.

== Early life ==
Jung's parents divorced when she was a young child and she was raised by her mother, Gong Min-ju. Throughout Jung's childhood, Gong worked several jobs including as a singer and comedy club manager in order to support her daughter.

== Youth career ==
Jung trained in the football academies at Oju Middle School and Dongsan I.C.T. High School in Seoul. Jung was selected for South Korea's senior national team while still at high school and her talent was such that some speculated Dongsan's performance as a team would suffer significantly following her graduation.

Jung went on to play for Hanyang Women's University. In 2008, she sustained a serious injury to her foot that forced her to take a year off from football, but upon her return she played a key role in Hanyang's victory at the 2009 Queen's Cup, earning the tournament's top goalscorer award.

== Club career ==
=== Incheon Hyundai Steel Red Angels ===
At the 2010 WK League draft, Jung was picked in the first round by Incheon Hyundai Steel Red Angels. During off-season training before the 2011 season, Jung suffered a shoulder injury that saw her take another three months away from the pitch, but once again she made an impact upon her return to the squad, including scoring twice in the 2011 WK League championship final against Goyang Daekyo.

Jung scored the only goal in the 2014 WK League championship final, which saw Incheon win their second championship title. In the second leg of the 2018 WK League championship final, Jung converted two crucial penalties for Incheon to help the side recover from a 3–0 loss to Gyeongju KHNP in the first leg. The match ended in a draw, and the championship was decided by a penalty shootout, in which Jung scored again and Incheon eventually claimed the title. She was Incheon's club captain in 2019, leading the Red Angels to their seventh consecutive title and in their first continental competition, the 2019 AFC Women's Club Championship.

Jung scored the deciding goal in yet another WK League championship final in 2020, as Incheon defeated Gyeongju to successfully defend their title. She scored a hattrick in the opening match of the 2021 WK League season, which saw Incheon beat Seoul City 7-0. In 2022, Incheon Hyundai and Gyeongju KHNP met in the final once again, and Jung scored one of two goals for the Red Angels to seal the team's tenth title.

She was part of Incheon's squad throughout their run of eleven consecutive WK League titles. During her fourteen years at the club, Jung also won four National Women's Football Championship titles and four National Sports Festival gold medals.

=== Sejong Sportstoto ===
In 2024, she transferred to Sejong Sportstoto, playing under former national team manager Yoon Deok-yeo. Yoon hoped that alongside several other veteran players, Jung's experience would help Sejong reach the WK League playoff for the first time since 2016. Jung played for Sportstoto for two years before announcing her retirement from football at the end of the 2025 season.

== International career ==
Jung first represented South Korea in 2006 while still attending high school, making her debut for the senior team in Canada at the Peace Queen Cup. The following year, she made her first appearance for the under-20 side at the 2007 AFC U-19 Women's Championship, where she scored in all three of South Korea's group stage matches.

She went on to represent the country at major tournaments including the 2010 AFC Women's Asian Cup.

== Style of play ==
Jung played as a striker and was known for her power, agility, and goalscoring ability. She gained attention for her powerful knuckleball, which she practiced after watching videos of Cristiano Ronaldo and demonstrated in a match at the 2014 Asian Games. She has been referred to as the 'North Korea killer' for scoring against the country on two separate occasions, in 2014 and 2016.

== Personal life ==
Jung changed her name in 2011 on the advice of her mother, who felt that a different name might give her better fortune and make her less likely to sustain injuries. She has several tattoos including the words "Don't touch me" on her arm.

== Career statistics ==
=== International ===
Appearances and goals by national team and year
National team	Year	Apps	Goals
South Korea	2006	4	0
South Korea	2007	9	2
South Korea	2008	1	0
South Korea	2010	5	1
South Korea	2011	2	1
South Korea	2013	4	1
South Korea	2014	6	6
South Korea	2015	15	1
South Korea	2016	11	7
South Korea	2017	8	0
South Korea	2018	7	1
South Korea	2019	8	2
South Korea	2022	1	0
South Korea	2023	3	0
Total		84	22

Scores and results list South Korea's goal tally first, score column indicates score after each Jung goal.

List of international goals scored by Jung Seol-bin
No.	Date	Venue	Opponent	Score	Result	Competition	Ref.
1	3 June 2007	National Olympic Stadium, Tokyo, Japan	Japan	6–1	6–1	2008 Olympic Women's Asian Qualifiers	
2	1 July 2007	LeoPalace Resort Main Stadium, Guam, United States	Guam	4–1	4–1	2008 EAFF Women's Football Championship	
3	23 May 2010	Shuangliu Sports Centre, Sichuan, China	Vietnam	4–0	5–0	2010 AFC Women's Asian Cup	
4	8 September 2011	Jinan Olympic Sports Center, Jinan, China	Thailand	1–0	3–0	2012 Olympic Women's Asian Qualifiers	
5	14 January 2013	Yongchuan Sports Center, Chongqing, China	Canada	3–0	3–1	2013 Four Nations Tournament	
6	14 September 2014	Namdong Asiad Rugby Field, Incheon, South Korea	Thailand	1–0	5–0	2014 Asian Games	
7	17 September 2014	Namdong Asiad Rugby Field, Incheon, South Korea	India	6–0	10–0	2014 Asian Games	
8	17 September 2014	Namdong Asiad Rugby Field, Incheon, South Korea	India	10–0	10–0	2014 Asian Games	
9	21 September 2014	Munhak Stadium, Incheon, South Korea	Maldives	1–0	13–0	2014 Asian Games	
10	29 September 2014	Munhak Stadium, Incheon, South Korea	North Korea	1–0	1–2	2014 Asian Games	
11	1 October 2014	Incheon Football Stadium, Incheon, South Korea	Vietnam	1–0	3–0	2014 Asian Games	
12	1 August 2015	Wuhan Sports Center Stadium, Wuhan, China	China	1–0	1–0	2015 EAFF Women's East Asian Cup	
13	29 February 2016	Nagai Stadium, Osaka, Japan	North Korea	1–0	1–1	2016 AFC Women's Olympic Qualifying Tournament	
14	2 March 2016	Kincho Stadium, Osaka, Japan	Japan	1–1	1–1	2016 AFC Women's Olympic Qualifying Tournament	
15	8 November 2016	Hong Kong Football Club Stadium, Hong Kong	Guam	1–0	13–0	2017 EAFF E-1 Football Championship	
16	8 November 2016	Hong Kong Football Club Stadium, Hong Kong	Guam	3–0	13–0	2017 EAFF E-1 Football Championship	
17	8 November 2016	Hong Kong Football Club Stadium, Hong Kong	Guam	5–0	13–0	2017 EAFF E-1 Football Championship	
18	8 November 2016	Hong Kong Football Club Stadium, Hong Kong	Guam	7–0	13–0	2017 EAFF E-1 Football Championship	
19	14 November 2016	Hong Kong Football Club Stadium, Hong Kong	Chinese Taipei	5–0	9–0	2017 EAFF E-1 Football Championship	
20	28 February 2018	Estádio Municipal de Albufeira, Albufeira, Portugal	Russia	3–1	3–1	2018 Algarve Cup	
21	17 January 2019	Wuhua County Olympic Sports Centre, Meizhou, China	Romania	2–0	3–0	2019 Four Nations Tournament	
22	15 December 2019	Busan Asiad Main Stadium, Busan, South Korea	Chinese Taipei	3–0	3–0	2019 EAFF E-1 Football Championship	

== Honours ==
Incheon Hyundai Steel Red Angels

- WK League: 2013, 2014, 2015, 2016, 2017, 2018, 2019, 2020, 2021, 2022, 2023
- National Women's Football Championship: 2012, 2015, 2016, 2021
- National Sports Festival: 2012, 2014, 2017, 2018

South Korea

- Asian Games Bronze medal: 2014
