= Kim Seong-mi =

South Korean footballer (born 1997)

Personal information
- Date of birth: April 2, 1997 (age 29)
- Height: 1.64 m (5 ft 5 in)
- Position: Midfielder

Team information
- Current team: Gangjin Swans
- Number: 19

Youth career
- 2010-2012: Gwangyeong Middle School
- 2013-2015: Gwangyang Girls' High School
- 2016-2017: Ulsan College

Senior career*
Years	Team	Apps	(Gls)
2018-2022	Sejong Sportstoto		
2023-2025	Incheon Hyundai		
2026-	Gangjin Swans		

International career^{‡}
2013	South Korea U-17	4	(1)
2016	South Korea U-20	6	(1)
2021-	South Korea	3	(0)
- * Club domestic league appearances and goals ‡ National team caps and goals as of 05:37, 17 September 2026 (UTC)

Kim Seong-mi (Korean: 김성미, born 2 April 1997) is a South Korean professional footballer who plays as a midfielder for WK League side Gangjin Swans. She played for South Korea at the 2022 AFC Women's Asian Cup.

== Club career ==
Kim was selected by Gumi Sportstoto in the first round of the 2018 WK League new players draft. After four years at Sportstoto, she transferred to Incheon Hyundai Steel Red Angels, making her debut appearance for the club in the first round of the 2023 WK League. Kim signed with Gangjin Swans ahead of the 2026 WK League season. She was named as one of the club's vice-captains.

== International career ==
Kim scored in a friendly against Australia while playing for South Korea's under-16 side, and later played for the country's under-20 team, including at the 2016 FIFA U-20 Women's World Cup. She also played at the 2017 Summer Universiade, scoring a consolation goal in South Korea's final match against the United States as the team finished in sixth place.

Kim received her first senior call-up for South Korea in 2021 under then-manager Colin Bell. She was part of the squad for the 2022 AFC Women's Asian Cup, in which South Korea finished as runners-up.

== Honours ==
=== Incheon Hyundai Steel Red Angels ===
- WK League champions: 2023

=== South Korea ===
- AFC Women's Asian Cup runners-up: 2022
