= 2023 WK League =

Fifteenth season of the top Korean women's association football league

WK League
- Season: 2023
- Dates: 24 March – 3 September 2023
- Champions: Incheon Hyundai Steel Red Angels (11th title)
- Champions League: Incheon Hyundai Steel Red Angels
- Matches: 84
- Goals: 214 (2.55 per match)
- Top goalscorer: Moon Mi-ra (12 goals)
- Biggest home win: Incheon 6–0 Seoul
- Biggest away win: Mungyeong 0–5 Incheon
- Highest scoring: Suwon 6–2 Seoul
- Longest winning run: 5 matches Incheon and Suwon
- Longest unbeaten run: 10 matches Incheon
- Longest winless run: 11 matches Changnyeong
- Longest losing run: 5 matches Boeun
- (Note: All statistics do not include play-off matches)

The 2023 WK League was the 15th season of the WK League, the top division of women's football in South Korea. The regular season ran from 24 March to 3 September 2023, and the play-offs from 11 to 25 November 2023. Incheon Hyundai Steel Red Angels won their eleventh consecutive title after beating Suwon FC in the final. As winners, they qualified for the inaugural edition of the AFC Women's Champions League.

Boeun Sangmu relocated from Boeun to Mungyeong before the season and renamed as Mungyeong Sangmu.

== Teams ==
=== Stadiums and locations ===
Locations of the 2023 WK League teams

Team	City	Stadium	Capacity	Position in 2022
Changnyeong WFC	Changnyeong	Changnyeong Sports Park	2,500	7th place
Gyeongju KHNP	Gyeongju	Gyeongju Football Park	650	Runners-up
Hwacheon KSPO	Hwacheon	Hwacheon Sports Park	3,000	4th place
Incheon Hyundai Steel Red Angels	Incheon	Incheon Namdong Asiad Rugby Field	5,078	Champions
Mungyeong Sangmu	Mungyeong	Mungyeong Civic Stadium	9,000	6th place
Sejong Sportstoto	Sejong	Sejong Central Park	1,000	8th place
Seoul WFC	Seoul	Seoul World Cup Auxiliary Stadium	1,012	5th place
Suwon FC	Suwon	Suwon Sports Complex	11,808	3rd place

=== Foreign players ===
The total number of foreign players was restricted to three per club, including a slot for a player from the Asian Football Confederation countries. Mungyeong Sangmu were not allowed to sign any foreign players due to their military status.

Club	Player 1	Player 2	AFC player
Changnyeong WFC	(United States) Enzi Broussard	(Japan) Nanase Kiryu	(Japan) Sawako Yasumoto
Gyeongju KHNP	(Cameroon) Farida Machia	(Nigeria) Chinaza Uchendu	(Japan) Asuna Tanaka
Hwacheon KSPO			(Japan) Natsuki Yoshimi
Incheon Hyundai Steel Red Angels	(Kenya) Tereza Engesha	(Ivory Coast) Ines Nrehy	
Sejong Sportstoto	(South Africa) Hildah Magaia	(Brazil) Gabrielle Itacaré	
Seoul WFC			
Suwon FC	(Ivory Coast) Josée Nahi		(Japan) Mebae Tanaka

== Regular season ==
=== League table ===
Pos	Team	Pld	W	D	L	GF	GA	GD	Pts	Qualification
1	Incheon Hyundai Steel Red Angels	21	13	3	5	36	14	+22	42	Qualification for play-offs final
2	Hwacheon KSPO	21	12	5	4	33	18	+15	41	Qualification for play-offs semi-final
3	Suwon FC	21	12	4	5	36	15	+21	40	Qualification for play-offs semi-final
4	Gyeongju KHNP	21	9	6	6	25	21	+4	33	
5	Sejong Sportstoto	21	6	4	11	27	33	−6	22	
6	Mungyeong Sangmu	21	5	6	10	20	38	−18	21	
7	Seoul WFC	21	4	7	10	22	38	−16	19	
8	Changnyeong WFC	21	3	5	13	15	37	−22	14	

Source: Soccerway

=== Results ===
==== Matches 1–14 ====
Home \ Away	CHA	GYE	HWA	INC	MUN	SEJ	SEO	SUW
Changnyeong WFC	—	1–2	2–1	0–1	0–0	0–2	1–2	0–4
Gyeongju KHNP	2–0	—	1–1	2–1	0–1	2–1	2–0	0–0
Hwacheon KSPO	3–0	2–0	—	2–0	3–2	2–1	0–1	0–0
Incheon Hyundai Steel Red Angels		1–1	2–1	—	3–0	1–2	0–0	0–1
Mungyeong Sangmu	2–1	0–3	0–3	0–5	—	1–1	2–2	1–0
Sejong Sportstoto	2–4	3–1	0–3	2–3	1–1	—	1–3	0–1
Seoul WFC	1–1	0–0	1–2	0–0	2–2	2–3	—	2–0
Suwon FC	1–1	2–0	1–2	1–2	3–0	2–0	3–0	—

Source: Soccerway
Legend: Blue = home team win; Yellow = draw; Red = away team win.

==== Matches 15–21 ====
Home \ Away	CHA	GYE	HWA	INC	MUN	SEJ	SEO	SUW
Changnyeong WFC	—		0–1	0–1	1–0			0–4
Gyeongju KHNP	3–0	—		0–3	3–0		0–0	1–0
Hwacheon KSPO		3–2	—	0–0			1–0	
Incheon Hyundai Steel Red Angels	2–0			—	1–0	1–0	6–0	1–2
Mungyeong Sangmu	0–0	2–2	2–0		—	0–3	2–1	
Sejong Sportstoto	1–1	0–1	1–1			—		
Seoul WFC	2–2			0–2		0–1	—	
Suwon FC			2–2		1–0	2–1	6–2	—

Source: Soccerway
Legend: Blue = home team win; Yellow = draw; Red = away team win.

== Statistics ==
=== Top scorers ===
Rank	Player	Club	Goals
1	(South Korea) Moon Mi-ra	Suwon FC	12
2	(South Korea) Jung Seol-bin	Incheon Hyundai Steel Red Angels	10
3	(South Africa) Hildah Magaia	Sejong Sportstoto	9
3	(South Korea) Lee Jeong-eun	Hwacheon KSPO	9
5	(South Korea) Yeo Min-ji	Gyeongju KHNP	8
6	(South Korea) Choi Yoo-jung	Incheon Hyundai Steel Red Angels	7
6	(South Korea) Moon Eun-ju	Hwacheon KSPO	7
8	(South Korea) Park Eun-sun	Seoul WFC	6

== Championship play-offs ==
=== Bracket ===
Semi-final			Final
			1	Incheon Hyundai Steel Red Angels	1	6	7
2	Hwacheon KSPO	1		Suwon FC	3	2	5
3	Suwon FC (a.e.t.)	2

=== Semi-final ===
11 November 2023
14:00 UTC+9

Hwacheon KSPO	1–2 (a.e.t.)	Suwon FC
Lee Jeong-eun 89'	Report	Moon Mi-ra 19'; Tanaka 112'

Hwacheon Sports Park, Hwacheon

=== Final ===
19 November 2023
14:00 UTC+9

Suwon FC	3–1	Incheon Hyundai Steel Red Angels
Ji So-yun 73', 80'; Kim Yun-ji 90'	Report	Jang Chang 38'

Suwon Stadium, Suwon

25 November 2023
14:00 UTC+9

Incheon Hyundai Steel Red Angels	6–2	Suwon FC
Lim Seon-joo 7'; Son Hwa-yeon 23', 39', 40'; Nrehy 68', 90'	Report	Nahi 46'; Moon Mi-ra 86'

Namdong Asiad Rugby Field, Incheon

Incheon Hyundai Steel Red Angels won 7–5 on aggregate.

=== Final table ===
Pos	Team	Qualification
1	Incheon Hyundai Steel Red Angels (C)	Qualification for Champions League
2	Suwon FC	
3	Hwacheon KSPO	

Source: Soccerway
(C) Champions
