= 2020 WK League =

WK League
- Season: 2020
- Dates: 15 June – 15 October 2020
- Champions: Incheon Hyundai Steel Red Angels (8th title)
- Matches: 84
- Goals: 262 (3.12 per match)
- Top goalscorer: Choi Yoo-jung; Kim Sang-eun (11 goals each)
- Biggest home win: Incheon 6–1 Hwacheon; Incheon 5–0 Sejong; Incheon 5–0 Boeun
- Biggest away win: Changnyeong 0–5 Incheon; Hwacheon 0–5 Incheon
- Highest scoring: Incheon 6–1 Hwacheon; Sejong 5–2 Changnyeong
- Longest winning run: 12 matches Gyeongju
- Longest unbeaten run: 12 matches Gyeongju and Incheon
- Longest winless run: 11 matches Boeun
- Longest losing run: 11 matches Boeun
- (Note: All statistics do not include play-off matches)

The 2020 WK League was the twelfth season of the WK League, the top division of women's football in South Korea. The regular season ran from 15 June to 15 October 2020. Due to the COVID-19 pandemic, the total amount of rounds were reduced from 28 to 21.

Before the season, Gumi Sportstoto relocated to Sejong City.

Incheon Hyundai Steel Red Angels won their eighth consecutive title after defeating Gyeongju KHNP in the play-offs final.

== Teams ==
=== Stadiums and locations ===
Locations of the 2020 WK League teams

| Team | City | Stadium | Capacity | Position in 2019 |
|---|---|---|---|---|
| Boeun Sangmu | Boeun | Boeun Public Stadium | 6,000 | 6th place |
| Changnyeong WFC | Changnyeong | Changnyeong Sports Park | 2,500 | 8th place |
| Gyeongju KHNP | Gyeongju | Gyeongju Football Park | 650 | 3rd place |
| Hwacheon KSPO | Hwacheon | Hwacheon Sports Park | 3,000 | 4th place |
| Incheon Hyundai Steel Red Angels | Incheon | Incheon Namdong Asiad Rugby Field | 5,078 | Champions |
| Sejong Sportstoto | Sejong | Sejong Central Park | 1,000 | 5th place |
| Seoul WFC | Seoul | Mokdong Stadium | 15,511 | 7th place |
| Suwon UDC | Suwon | Suwon Sports Complex | 11,808 | Runners-up |

=== Foreign players ===
The total number of foreign players was restricted to three per club, including a slot for a player from the Asian Football Confederation countries. Boeun Sangmu were not allowed to sign any foreign players due to their military status.

| Club | Player 1 | Player 2 | AFC player |
|---|---|---|---|
| Changnyeong WFC | (Japan) Aya Shimojo | (Japan) Nanase Kiryu | |
| Gyeongju KHNP | (Ivory Coast) Josée Nahi | (Ivory Coast) Ines Nrehy | (Japan) Asuna Tanaka |
| Hwacheon KSPO | (Brazil) Nathane | (Japan) Natsuki Yoshimi | (Japan) Fumina Katsurama |
| Incheon Hyundai Steel Red Angels | (Brazil) Neném | (Spain) Eli del Estal | |
| Sejong Sportstoto | | | |
| Seoul WFC | | | |
| Suwon UDC | | (Japan) Madoka Haji | |

== Regular season ==
=== League table ===
| Pos | Team | Pld | W | D | L | GF | GA | GD | Pts | Qualification |
|---|---|---|---|---|---|---|---|---|---|---|
| 1 | Incheon Hyundai Steel Red Angels (C) | 21 | 18 | 1 | 2 | 60 | 11 | +49 | 55 | Qualification for play-offs final |
| 2 | Gyeongju KHNP | 21 | 17 | 3 | 1 | 43 | 13 | +30 | 54 | Qualification for play-offs semi-final |
| 3 | Suwon UDC | 21 | 11 | 0 | 10 | 34 | 24 | +10 | 33 | Qualification for play-offs semi-final |
| 4 | Hwacheon KSPO | 21 | 9 | 5 | 7 | 24 | 31 | −7 | 32 | |
| 5 | Changnyeong WFC | 21 | 7 | 5 | 9 | 33 | 41 | −8 | 26 | |
| 6 | Sejong Sportstoto | 21 | 6 | 3 | 12 | 27 | 41 | −14 | 21 | |
| 7 | Seoul WFC | 21 | 3 | 4 | 14 | 20 | 49 | −29 | 13 | |
| 8 | Boeun Sangmu | 21 | 2 | 1 | 18 | 21 | 52 | −31 | 7 | |

Source: Soccerway
(C) Champions

=== Results ===
==== Matches 1–14 ====
| Home \ Away | BOE | CHA | GYE | HWA | INC | SEJ | SEO | SUW |
|---|---|---|---|---|---|---|---|---|
| Boeun Sangmu | — | 2–3 | 0–3 | 0–1 | 0–2 | 0–2 | 0–1 | 0–2 |
| Changnyeong WFC | 2–2 | — | 0–0 | 2–3 | 0–1 | 2–2 | 2–1 | 2–3 |
| Gyeongju KHNP | 2–4 | 5–1 | — | 2–0 | 0–0 | 3–0 | 4–1 | 1–0 |
| Hwacheon KSPO | 1–0 | 1–2 | 1–1 | — | 0–5 | 2–0 | 2–0 | 0–2 |
| Incheon Hyundai Steel Red Angels | 5–0 | 2–0 | 0–2 | 6–1 | — | 5–0 | 3–0 | 1–0 |
| Sejong Sportstoto | 2–1 | 0–2 | 1–3 | 1–1 | 0–4 | — | 0–1 | 1–2 |
| Seoul WFC | 3–2 | 3–3 | 1–2 | 2–2 | 1–2 | 2–4 | — | 0–4 |
| Suwon UDC | 3–2 | 3–0 | 0–1 | 1–2 | 1–2 | 0–1 | 2–1 | — |

Source: Soccerway
Legend: Blue = home team win; Yellow = draw; Red = away team win.

==== Matches 15–21 ====
| Home \ Away | BOE | CHA | GYE | HWA | INC | SEJ | SEO | SUW |
|---|---|---|---|---|---|---|---|---|
| Boeun Sangmu | — | 0–3 | 1–3 | | | 0–4 | 4–0 | |
| Changnyeong WFC | | — | 0–1 | 1–1 | 0–5 | | | |
| Gyeongju KHNP | | | — | | 3–2 | 2–1 | 2–0 | 1–0 |
| Hwacheon KSPO | 2–1 | | 0–2 | — | | | 1–1 | 1–0 |
| Incheon Hyundai Steel Red Angels | 4–0 | | | 2–0 | — | 4–2 | | 3–1 |
| Sejong Sportstoto | | 5–2 | | 0–2 | | — | | 0–2 |
| Seoul WFC | | 0–4 | | | 0–2 | 1–1 | — | 1–3 |
| Suwon UDC | 4–2 | 1–2 | | | | | | — |

Source: Soccerway
Legend: Blue = home team win; Yellow = draw; Red = away team win.

== Statistics ==
=== Top scorers ===
| Rank | Player | Club | Goals |
|---|---|---|---|
| 1 | (South Korea) Choi Yoo-jung | Incheon Hyundai Steel Red Angels | 11 |
| 1 | (South Korea) Kim Sang-eun | Sejong Sportstoto | 11 |
| 3 | (South Korea) Kang Chae-rim | Incheon Hyundai Steel Red Angels | 9 |
| 3 | (South Korea) Kwon Ha-neul | Boeun Sangmu | 9 |
| 3 | (South Korea) Yeo Min-ji | Suwon UDC | 9 |
| 6 | (South Korea) Choi Ji-na | Changnyeong WFC | 8 |
| 6 | (South Korea) Moon Mi-ra | Suwon UDC | 8 |
| 6 | (South Korea) Kim Yun-ji | Suwon UDC | 8 |
| 6 | (Spain) Eli del Estal | Incheon Hyundai Steel Red Angels | 8 |
| 10 | (South Korea) Jung Seol-bin | Incheon Hyundai Steel Red Angels | 7 |
| 10 | (South Korea) Son Hwa-yeon | Changnyeong WFC | 7 |

== Championship play-offs ==
=== Bracket ===
| Semi-final | | | Final |
| | | | 1 | Incheon Hyundai Steel Red Angels | 0 | 2 | 2 |
| 2 | Gyeongju KHNP | 1 | | Gyeongju KHNP | 0 | 0 | 0 |
| 3 | Suwon UDC | 0 |

=== Semi-final ===
9 November 2020
18:00 UTC+9

| Gyeongju KHNP | 1–0 | Suwon UDC |
|---|---|---|
| Jeong Ji-yeon 66' | Report |

Gyeongju Football Park, Gyeongju

=== Final ===
12 November 2020
18:00 UTC+9

| Gyeongju KHNP | 0–0 | Incheon Hyundai Steel Red Angels |
|---|---|---|
| | Report |

Gyeongju Football Park, Gyeongju

16 November 2020
18:00 UTC+9

| Incheon Hyundai Steel Red Angels | 2–0 | Gyeongju KHNP |
|---|---|---|
| Jung Seol-bin 76'; Eli del Estal 90+4' | Report |

Namdong Rugby Stadium, Incheon

Incheon Hyundai Steel Red Angels won 2–0 on aggregate.
