= 2021 WK League =

Thirteenth season of the top Korean women's association football league

WK League
- Season: 2021
- Dates: 26 April – 9 November 2021
- Champions: Incheon Hyundai Steel Red Angels (9th title)
- Matches: 84
- Goals: 253 (3.01 per match)
- Top goalscorer: Josée Nahi (15 goals)
- Biggest home win: Incheon 7–0 Seoul
- Biggest away win: Boeun 0–6 Gyeongju
- Highest scoring: Incheon 7–0 Seoul
- Longest winning run: 9 matches Gyeongju
- Longest unbeaten run: 10 matches Incheon
- Longest winless run: 18 matches Changnyeong
- (Note: All statistics do not include play-off matches)

The 2021 WK League was the 13th season of the WK League, the top division of women's football in South Korea. The regular season ran from 26 April to 9 November 2021 (originally until 5 October, but was delayed because of the COVID-19 pandemic in South Korea).

Due to the COVID-19 pandemic, the total amount of rounds were reduced from 28 to 21 (same as the previous season).

== Teams ==
=== Stadiums and locations ===
Locations of the 2021 WK League teams

Team	City	Stadium	Capacity	Position in 2020
Boeun Sangmu	Boeun	Boeun Public Stadium	6,000	8th place
Changnyeong WFC	Changnyeong	Changnyeong Sports Park	2,500	5th place
Gyeongju KHNP	Gyeongju	Gyeongju Football Park	650	Runners-up
Hwacheon KSPO	Hwacheon	Hwacheon Sports Park	3,000	4th place
Incheon Hyundai Steel Red Angels	Incheon	Incheon Namdong Asiad Rugby Field	5,078	Champions
Sejong Sportstoto	Sejong	Sejong Central Park	1,000	6th place
Seoul WFC	Seoul	Mokdong Stadium	15,511	7th place
Suwon UDC	Suwon	Suwon Sports Complex	11,808	3rd place

=== Foreign players ===
The total number of foreign players was restricted to three per club, including a slot for a player from the Asian Football Confederation countries. Boeun Sangmu were not allowed to sign any foreign players due to their military status.

Club	Player 1	Player 2	AFC player
Changnyeong WFC	(Japan) Nanase Kiryu		(Japan) Aya Shimojo
Gyeongju KHNP	(Ivory Coast) Josée Nahi	(Ivory Coast) Ines Nrehy	(Japan) Asuna Tanaka
Hwacheon KSPO	(Japan) Fumina Katsurama	(Brazil) Thays Ferrer	(Japan) Natsuki Yoshimi
Incheon Hyundai Steel Red Angels	(Spain) Eli del Estal	(Brazil) Neném	
Sejong Sportstoto			
Seoul WFC			
Suwon UDC	(Japan) Sawako Yasumoto	(Japan) Naoko Sakuramoto	(Japan) Mebae Tanaka

== Regular season ==
=== League table ===
Pos	Team	Pld	W	D	L	GF	GA	GD	Pts	Qualification
1	Incheon Hyundai Steel Red Angels (C)	21	17	1	3	51	14	+37	52	Qualification for play-offs final
2	Gyeongju KHNP	21	16	3	2	59	17	+42	51	Qualification for play-offs semi-final
3	Suwon UDC	21	9	3	9	35	27	+8	30	Qualification for play-offs semi-final
4	Seoul WFC	21	9	3	9	28	44	−16	30	
5	Hwacheon KSPO	21	7	7	7	28	30	−2	28	
6	Boeun Sangmu	21	5	7	9	16	30	−14	22	
7	Sejong Sportstoto	21	4	2	15	17	44	−27	14	
8	Changnyeong WFC	21	1	6	14	19	47	−28	9	

Source: Soccerway
(C) Champions

=== Results ===
==== Matches 1–14 ====
Home \ Away	BOE	CHA	GYE	HWA	INC	SEJ	SEO	SUW
Boeun Sangmu	—	1–0	0–6	1–1	1–3	0–1	1–1	0–2
Changnyeong WFC	0–2	—	1–2	3–3	0–5	1–1	1–2	2–2
Gyeongju KHNP	3–0	3–2	—	1–1	3–1	1–0	3–0	1–2
Hwacheon KSPO	2–2	1–1	1–3	—	1–3	3–1	1–0	1–0
Incheon Hyundai Steel Red Angels	0–0	3–0	1–0	2–0	—	3–1	7–0	1–2
Sejong Sportstoto	0–1	3–2	1–3	1–1	0–2	—	1–4	0–4
Seoul WFC	2–1	1–0	2–2	1–0	2–3	4–1	—	1–2
Suwon UDC	0–0	2–1	2–2	2–4	0–1	4–0	2–3	—

Source: Soccerway
Legend: Blue = home team win; Yellow = draw; Red = away team win.

==== Matches 15–21 ====
Home \ Away	BOE	CHA	GYE	HWA	INC	SEJ	SEO	SUW
Boeun Sangmu	—			1–0				0–1
Changnyeong WFC	1–1	—			0–1	0–2	3–1	0–4
Gyeongju KHNP	3–0	6–0	—	4–1			6–0	4–1
Hwacheon KSPO		1–1		—			2–1	1–0
Incheon Hyundai Steel Red Angels	3–1		1–2	1–0	—		5–0	3–1
Sejong Sportstoto	0–2		0–1	1–3	0–2	—	3–0	0–3
Seoul WFC	1–1						—	1–0
Suwon UDC								—

Source: Soccerway
Legend: Blue = home team win; Yellow = draw; Red = away team win.

== Statistics ==
=== Top scorers ===
Rank	Player	Club	Goals
1	(Ivory Coast) Josée Nahi	Gyeongju KHNP	15
2	(Ivory Coast) Ines Nrehy	Gyeongju KHNP	11
2	(South Korea) Son Hwa-yeon	Incheon Hyundai Steel Red Angels	11
2	(South Korea) Moon Mi-ra	Suwon UDC	11
5	(South Korea) Yeo Min-ji	Gyeongju KHNP	9
5	(South Korea) Choi Yoo-jung	Incheon Hyundai Steel Red Angels	9
7	(South Korea) Yoo Young-a	Seoul WFC	8
8	(Brazil) Thays Ferrer	Hwacheon KSPO	7

== Championship play-offs ==
=== Bracket ===
Semi-final			Final
			1	Incheon Hyundai Steel Red Angels	1	1	2
2	Gyeongju KHNP	5		Gyeongju KHNP	1	0	1
3	Suwon UDC	4

=== Semi-final ===
12 November 2021
18:00 UTC+9

Gyeongju KHNP	5–4	Suwon UDC
A. Tanaka 21'; Park Ye-eun 47'; Yeo Min-ji 48'; Nahi 58', 84'	Report	Jeoun Eun-ha 3'; Chu Hyo-joo 18'; Moon Mi-ra 42'; M. Tanaka 90+1'

Gyeongju Football Park, Gyeongju
Referee: Kim Yoo-jung

=== Final ===
16 November 2021
18:00 UTC+9

Gyeongju KHNP	1–1	Incheon Hyundai Steel Red Angels
Tanaka 90+3'	Report	Kim Hye-yeong 3' (o.g.)

Gyeongju Football Park, Gyeongju
Referee: Jo Hae-mi

19 November 2021
18:00 UTC+9

Incheon Hyundai Steel Red Angels	1–0	Gyeongju KHNP
Choe Yu-ri 51'	Report

Namdong Asiad Rugby Field, Incheon
Referee: Cha Min-ji

Incheon Hyundai Steel Red Angels won 2–1 on aggregate.
