= Lee Young-ju =

South Korean footballer (born 1992)

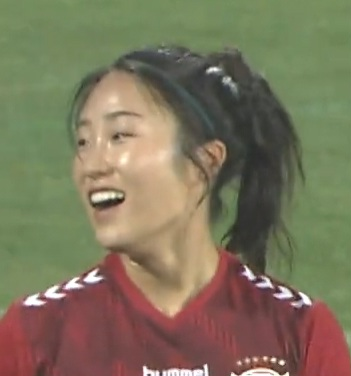

Personal information
- Date of birth: 22 April 1992 (age 34)
- Place of birth: South Korea
- Height: 1.63 m (5 ft 4 in)
- Position: Midfielder

Team information
- Current team: Gyeongju KHNP
- Number: 17

Senior career*
Years	Team	Apps	(Gls)
2013–2016	Boeun Sangmu		
2016–2021	Hyundai Steel Red Angels		
2022–2024	Madrid CFF	36	(2)
2024–2025	Levante Badalona	24	(0)
2025–	Gyeongju KHNP		

International career^{‡}
2007–2008	South Korea U17	5	(1)
2009–2012	South Korea U20	16	(0)
2014–	South Korea	73	(2)
- * Club domestic league appearances and goals as of 5 June 2025 ‡ National team caps and goals as of 5 June 2025

Lee Young-ju (Korean: 이영주, born 22 April 1992) is a South Korean professional footballer who plays as a midfielder for Gyeongju KHNP and the South Korea women's national team.

== Club career ==
Following success while playing for Hanyang Women's University and the South Korea U20 team, Lee was the first player to be selected in the 2012 WK League draft, signing a contract with the military team Busan Sangmu. In order to play for Sangmu, Lee underwent three months of basic training and joined the ROK Armed Forces as a non-commissioned officer. After her discharge from the military in 2016, she joined Incheon Hyundai Steel Red Angels, lifting the WK League trophy six times while at the club. In 2021, Lee became the second South Korean female footballer to play professionally in Spain, signing with Liga F side Madrid CFF. In 2024, she transferred to Levante Badalona. In 2025, Lee returned to the WK League, joining Gyeongju KHNP during the summer transfer window.

== International career ==
Lee played five matches for the South Korea U17 team in 2007 and 2008, and was part of the squad for the 2008 FIFA U-17 Women's World Cup, playing in one group match against Nigeria. She subsequently played for the South Korea U20 team between 2009 and 2012 and was a member of the squad that finished third in the 2010 FIFA U-20 Women's World Cup and reached the quarter-finals of the 2012 FIFA U-20 Women's World Cup. She made her full international debut on 17 September 2014 in a 2014 Asian Games match where South Korea routed India 10–0.
