= Choi Ye-seul (footballer, born 1997) =

South Korean footballer (born 1997)

Personal information
- Date of birth: 12 March 1997 (age 29)
- Place of birth: South Korea
- Position: Goalkeeper

Team information
- Current team: Gyeongju Korea Hydro & Nuclear Power WFC
- Number: 24

Senior career*
Years	Team	Apps	(Gls)
2018–2023	Changnyeong WFC		
2024–	Gyeongju Korea Hydro & Nuclear Power WFC		

International career
2023–	South Korea	2	(0)
- * Club domestic league appearances and goals

Choi Ye-seul (Korean: 최예슬; born 12 March 1997) is a South Korean footballer who plays as a goalkeeper for Gyeongju Korea Hydro & Nuclear Power WFC and the South Korea women's national football team.

== Early life ==
Choi was born in 1997 in South Korea. She participated in archery as a child.

== Career ==
Choi was first called up to the South Korea national football team in 2023. She also played for the national team in 2024.
