= Ines Nrehy =

Ivorian footballer

Inès Tia
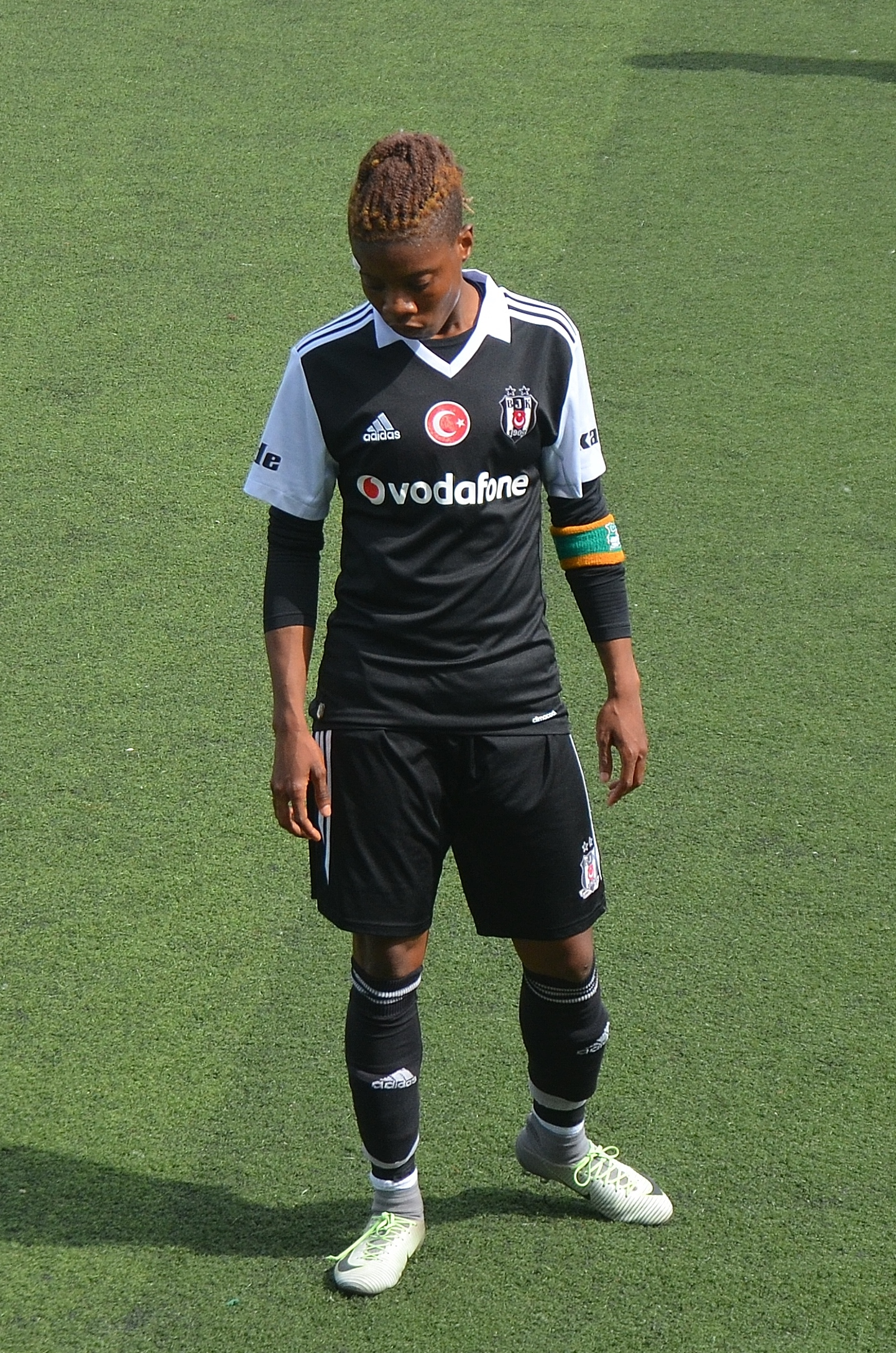
- Inès Nrehy with Beşiktaş J.K. in 2017

Personal information
- Full name: Vino Inès Nrehy Tia
- Date of birth: 1 October 1993 (age 33)
- Place of birth: Daloa, Ivory Coast
- Height: 1.67 m (5 ft 6 in)
- Position: Forward

Team information
- Current team: Henan Jianye
- Number: 20

Youth career
- Juventus Yopougon

Senior career*
Years	Team	Apps	(Gls)
2010–2012	Juventus Yopougon		
2013–2014	Spartak Subotica		
2015–2017	Rossiyanka	28	(8)
2017–2018	Beşiktaş J.K.	13	(10)
2018–2021	Gyeongju KHNP		
2022	Changnyeong WFC		
2023–2024	Hyundai Steel Red Angels		
2025–	Henan Jianye		

International career
- Ivory Coast
- * Club domestic league appearances and goals

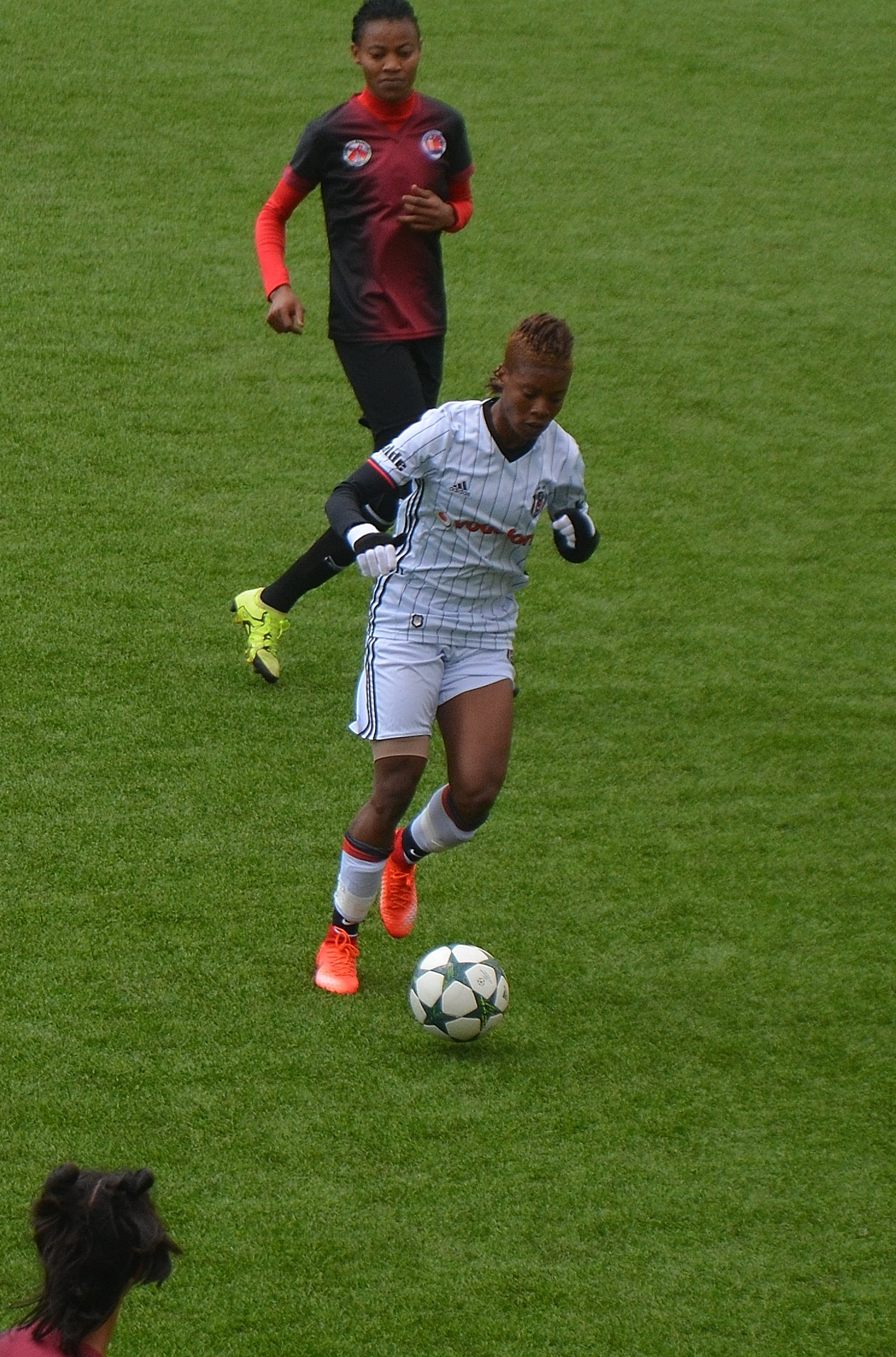
Tia playing for Turkish club Beşiktaş JK in the 2016–17 season's play-off home match against 1207 Antalya Döşemealtı Belediyespor.

Vino Inès Nrehy Tia (born 1 October 1993), also known as Inès Tia, is an Ivorian women's footballer who plays as a forward for Henan Jianye. She was part of the Ivorian squad for the 2015 FIFA Women's World Cup.

== Club career ==
Tia began her career at AS Juventus Yopougon in her homeland, where she played between 2010 and 2012. In the 2013–14 Serbian SuperLiga season, she played for Spartak Subotica and won the league title with the club. Tia then transferred to the Khimki-based Russian side Rossiyanka in April 2015, where she stayed for two seasons and scored 8 goals in 28 league matches. In the 2016 season, she also won the league title. Tia represented Rossiyanka in the 2016–17 UEFA Women's Champions League, making four appearances.

In February 2017, Tia moved to Turkey and signed with the Istanbul-based Beşiktaş J.K. to play in the second half of the Turkish First League season.

In March 2018, Tia left Turkey for South Korea. She joined Gyeongju KHNP WFC to play in the 2018 WK League.

== International career ==
Tia played for the Ivory Coast national team, and represented the nation at the 2012 and 2014 African Women's Championship and the 2015 FIFA Women's World Cup.

== Career statistics ==
As of 4 May 2021

Appearances and goals by club, season and competition
Club	Season	League			Cup		Continental		Total	
Club	Season	Division	Apps	Goals	Apps	Goals	Apps	Goals	Apps	Goals
Spartak Subotica	2013–14	Serbian SuperLiga					5	1	5	1
Spartak Subotica	2014–15	Serbian SuperLiga					3	3	3	3
Spartak Subotica	Total						8	4	8	4
Rossiyanka	2015	Russian Championship	14	5					14	5
Rossiyanka	2016	Russian Championship	14	3			4	1	18	4
Rossiyanka	Total		28	8			4	1	32	9
Beşiktaş J.K.	2016–17	Turkish First League	13	10					13	10

== Honours ==
Spartak Subotica

- Serbian Women's Super League: 2013–14

Rossiyanka

- Russian Championship: 2016; runner-up: 2015

Beşiktaş J.K.

- Turkish First League runner-up: 2016–17

Gyeongju KHNP WFC

- WK League runner-up: 2018, 2020, 2021

Hyundai Steel Red Angels

- WK League: 2023

Ivory Coast

- African Women's Championship third place: 2014

== See also ==
- List of Ivory Coast women's international footballers
