= 2018 WK League =

WK League
- Season: 2018
- Dates: 23 April – 22 October 2018
- Champions: Incheon Hyundai Steel Red Angels (6th title)
- AFC Club Championship: Incheon Hyundai Steel Red Angels
- Matches: 112
- Goals: 369 (3.29 per match)
- Top goalscorer: Bia Zaneratto (22 goals)
- Biggest home win: Incheon 7–1 Changnyeong
- Biggest away win: Seoul 0–6 Incheon
- Longest unbeaten run: 22 matches Incheon
- Longest winless run: 20 matches Boeun
- Highest attendance: 1,121
- Lowest attendance: 51
- Average attendance: 284
- (Note: All statistics do not include play-off matches)

The 2018 WK League was the tenth season of the WK League, the top division of women's football in South Korea. The regular season began on 23 April 2018 and ended on 22 October 2018.

In the off-season, Icheon Daekyo ceased operations, while Changnyeong WFC joined the league. Suwon FMC (Facilities Management Corporation) changed its name to Suwon UDC (Urban Development Corporation).

Incheon Hyundai Steel Red Angels won their sixth consecutive title.

== Teams ==
=== Stadiums and locations ===
Locations of the 2018 WK League teams

Team	City	Stadium	Capacity	Position in 2017
Boeun Sangmu	Boeun	Boeun Public Stadium	6,000	8th place
Changnyeong WFC	Changnyeong	Changnyeong Sports Park	2,500	—
Gumi Sportstoto	Gumi	Gumi Civic Stadium	35,000	6th place
Gyeongju KHNP	Gyeongju	Gyeongju Football Park	650	7th place
Hwacheon KSPO	Hwacheon	Hwacheon Sports Park	3,000	Runners-up
Incheon Hyundai Steel Red Angels	Incheon	Incheon Namdong Asiad Rugby Field	5,078	Champions
Seoul WFC	Seoul	Hyochang Stadium	15,194	4th place
Suwon UDC	Suwon	Suwon Sports Complex	11,808	5th place

=== Draft ===
The 2018 WK League Draft was held on 27 December 2017 at the Koreana Hotel in Seoul.

Military-owned team Boeun Sangmu was not allowed to participate in the main draft because of the military status, and it could select players among the applicants only.

Round	Player	Team	Previous team
1	Hong Hye-ji	Changnyeong WFC	INAC Kobe Leonessa
1	Son Hwa-yeon	Changnyeong WFC	Korea University
1	Kim Sung-mi	Gumi Sportstoto	Ulsan College
1	Han Chae-rin	Incheon Hyundai Steel Red Angels	Uiduk University
1	Jang Eun-mi	Seoul WFC	Gangwon State University
1	Maeng Da-hee	Hwacheon KSPO	Ulsan College
1	Kim Hyo-seon	Suwon UDC	Uiduk University
2	Kim Do-hyun	Gyeongju KHNP	Ulsan College
2	Lee Ji-eon	Hwacheon KSPO	Ulsan College
2	Kwon Do-hee	Incheon Hyundai Steel Red Angels	Korea University
3	Baek Jang-mi	Suwon UDC	Gangwon State University
3	Seo A-ri	Gyeongju KHNP	Hanyang Women's University
4	Oh Ji-eun	Suwon UDC	Hanyang Women's University
5	Choi Ye-seul	Changnyeong WFC	Gangwon State University
5	Kang Yu-ri	Hwacheon KSPO	Gangwon State University
5	Mo Soo-kyung	Suwon UDC	Ulsan College
5	Park Hye-joo	Gyeongju KHNP	Hanyang Women's University
6	Kim Dong-won	Suwon UDC	Ulsan College
6	Kwon Sung-kyung	Changnyeong WFC	Ulsan College
7	Park So-ri	Changnyeong WFC	Gangwon State University
8	Kim Ye-jin	Changnyeong WFC	Hanyang Women's University
9	Lee Do-hyun	Changnyeong WFC	Hanyang Women's University
10	Shin Ye-rim	Changnyeong WFC	Hanyang Women's University
Addition	Song Min-hee	Changnyeong WFC	Hanyang Women's University
Addition	Kim Min-soo	Boeun Sangmu	Hanyang Women's University
Addition	Shim Hyo-jung	Boeun Sangmu	Hanyang Women's University

=== Foreign players ===
The total number of foreign players was restricted to three per club, including a slot for a player from the Asian Football Confederation countries.

Military-owned team Boeun Sangmu was not allowed to sign any foreign players.

Club	Player 1	Player 2	AFC player
Changnyeong WFC			
Gumi Sportstoto			
Gyeongju KHNP	(Ivory Coast) Ines Nrehy	(Ivory Coast) Josée Nahi	(Japan) Asuna Tanaka
Hwacheon KSPO	(Brazil) Glaucia Cristiano		(Japan) Chiaki Minamiyama
Incheon Hyundai Steel Red Angels	(Brazil) Bia Zaneratto	(Brazil) Thaís Guedes	(Japan) Fuka Nagano
Seoul WFC			
Suwon UDC	(United States) Jennifer Skogerboe	(United States) Paige Nielsen	

== Regular season ==
=== League table ===
Pos	Team	Pld	W	D	L	GF	GA	GD	Pts	Qualification
1	Incheon Hyundai Steel Red Angels	28	21	6	1	84	21	+63	69	Qualification for playoffs final
2	Gyeongju KHNP	28	16	5	7	54	35	+19	53	Qualification for playoffs semi-final
3	Suwon UDC	28	14	8	6	48	34	+14	50	Qualification for playoffs semi-final
4	Gumi Sportstoto	28	15	3	10	49	38	+11	48	
5	Hwacheon KSPO	28	13	5	10	52	45	+7	44	
6	Seoul WFC	28	4	9	15	34	57	−23	21	
7	Boeun Sangmu	28	3	7	18	18	59	−41	16	
8	Changnyeong WFC	28	3	3	22	30	80	−50	12	

Source: Soccerway

=== Results ===
==== Matches 1–14 ====
Home \ Away	BOE	CHA	GUM	GYE	HWA	INC	SEO	SUW
Boeun Sangmu	—	0–3	0–0	0–2	2–2	0–5	0–0	1–2
Changnyeong WFC	1–3	—	4–3	0–3	1–3	2–4	1–2	0–2
Gumi Sportstoto	3–2	3–0	—	0–2	3–0	0–3	2–0	1–0
Gyeongju KHNP	1–0	2–1	1–1	—	1–1	1–3	2–2	2–4
Hwacheon KSPO	3–0	2–0	0–1	1–5	—	1–0	4–3	3–3
Incheon Hyundai Steel Red Angels	5–0	7–1	2–1	0–0	2–1	—	1–0	6–2
Seoul WFC	1–1	3–1	2–1	1–2	1–1	0–6	—	0–1
Suwon UDC	3–0	1–0	1–0	1–1	2–1	1–1	2–1	—

Source: Soccerway
Legend: Blue = home team win; Yellow = draw; Red = away team win.

==== Matches 15–28 ====
Home \ Away	BOE	CHA	GUM	GYE	HWA	INC	SEO	SUW
Boeun Sangmu	—	3–2	2–3	1–2	0–2	0–4	1–0	0–1
Changnyeong WFC	1–1	—	2–0	0–2	3–5	0–5	1–4	2–2
Gumi Sportstoto	2–0	2–1	—	2–0	3–1	0–3	4–0	1–1
Gyeongju KHNP	4–0	4–1	2–5	—	2–3	1–5	2–0	4–0
Hwacheon KSPO	4–1	4–0	1–3	0–2	—	1–2	1–0	0–0
Incheon Hyundai Steel Red Angels	0–0	4–0	3–1	1–0	4–1	—	3–3	3–2
Seoul WFC	0–0	2–2	3–4	1–2	0–4	2–2	—	1–1
Suwon UDC	3–0	4–0	2–0	1–2	1–2	0–0	5–2	—

Source: Soccerway
Legend: Blue = home team win; Yellow = draw; Red = away team win.

== Championship playoffs ==
The semi-final was contested between Gyeongju KHNP and Suwon UDC, the second and third-placed teams in the regular season, respectively. Gyeongju KHNP advanced to the two-legged final after defeating Suwon UDC 2–0, but lost 3–1 on penalties to regular season winners Incheon Hyundai Steel Red Angels in the final.

=== Bracket ===
Semi-final			Final
			1	Incheon Hyundai Steel Red Angels (p)	0	4	4 (3)
2	Gyeongju KHNP	2		Gyeongju KHNP	3	1	4 (1)
3	Suwon UDC	0

=== Semi-final ===
29 October 2018
19:00 UTC+9

Gyeongju KHNP	2–0	Suwon UDC
Lee Geum-min 30'; Park Ye-eun 32'	Report

Gyeongju Football Park, Gyeongju

=== Final ===
2 November 2018
19:00 UTC+9

Gyeongju KHNP	3–0	Incheon Hyundai Steel Red Angels
Tanaka 38' (pen.); Kim Do-yeon 42' (o.g.); Kim A-reum 72'	Report

Gyeongju Football Park, Gyeongju

5 November 2018
19:00 UTC+9

Incheon Hyundai Steel Red Angels	4–1 (a.e.t.)	Gyeongju KHNP
Jang Sel-gi 45+2'; Jung Seol-bin 50' (pen.), 90+5' (pen.); Thaís Guedes 98'		Tanaka 120' (pen.)
Penalties
	3–1

Namdong Asiad Rugby Field, Incheon

4–4 on aggregate. Incheon Hyundai Steel Red Angels won 3–1 on penalties.

=== Final table ===
Pos	Team	Qualification
1	Incheon Hyundai Steel Red Angels (C)	Qualification for AFC Club Championship
2	Gyeongju KHNP	
3	Suwon UDC	

Source: RSSSF
(C) Champions

== Attendance ==
Team	Pld	Total	Highest	Lowest	Average
Boeun Sangmu	11	7,658	1,121	100	696
Incheon Hyundai Steel Red Angels	12	3,429	872	178	285
Gumi Sportstoto	12	3,390	522	161	282
Hwacheon KSPO	14	3,479	817	100	248
Changnyeong WFC	12	2,896	512	51	241
Gyeongju KHNP	11	2,323	328	100	211
Seoul WFC	13	2,388	327	57	183
Suwon UDC	11	1,706	221	121	155
Total	96	27,269	1,121	51	284
