= Yeungjin College =

- Hangul: 영진 전문 대학교
- Hanja: 永進專門大學校
- RR: Yeongjin jeonmun daehakgyo
- MR: Yŏngjin chŏnmun taehakkyo

Yeungjin University, formerly Yeungjin College, is a private technical college located in Buk-gu, Daegu, South Korea. Information technology is the principal academic focus; however, courses of study in other fields such as nursing and international tourism are also provided.

== History ==
Founded on March 12, 1977, the educational foundation pioneered Korea’s first industry-linked customized education model, through which companies could request and secure the training of future employees in advance. The university is also known as the first institution in South Korea to develop this form of customized education and to spread the model to universities across the nation. This innovative approach transformed higher education in South Korea and later evolved into what is now widely recognized as industry-academia cooperation, becoming a fundamental framework of university education and playing a significant role in the industrial development of the Republic of Korea.

== Academics ==
The university offers a wide range of academic fields and departments, including engineering fields such as computers, semiconductors, electronics, machinery, and electrical engineering; humanities and social science fields such as business administration, tourism, welfare, and early childhood education; natural science fields such as nursing, health sciences, animal-related studies, and culinary arts; and arts and physical education fields such as design, comics, broadcasting and video production, beauty, and rehabilitation.

== See also ==
- List of colleges and universities in South Korea
- Education in South Korea
