= Mungyeong Sangmu WFC =

South Korean football club

Mungyeong Sangmu
- Full name: Mungyeong Sangmu Women's Football Club
- Founded: 2007; 19 years ago
- Ground: Mungyeong Civic Stadium
- Capacity: 4,959
- Manager: Lee Mi-yeon
- League: WK League
- 2026: WK League, 4th of 8
- Website: sangmu.mil.kr
Home colours	Away colours

Mungyeong Sangmu Women's Football Club (Korean: 문경 상무 여자 축구단) is a South Korean women's football section within the sports division of the Republic of Korea Armed Forces, based in Mungyeong, North Gyeongsang Province. The team was founded in 2007 and competes in the WK League, the top division of women's football in South Korea.

== History ==
Following the success of the women's national football team at the 2005 EAFF Women's Football Championship, and alongside plans to expand the female workforce in the military, the Ministry of National Defense announced in 2005 that it was considering establishing a women's football team. The team was established in 2007 and was initially based in Busan. Manager Lee Mi-yeon, appointed in 2008, was the first female coach of a Korean women's works football team.

Sangmu were one of the six teams to participate in the inaugural season of the WK League in 2009.

The team relocated to Boeun County in 2016 and was known as Boeun Sangmu until it moved again, to Mungyeong, in 2023.

In 2023, Mungyeong Sangmu, representing South Korea, won the World Military Women's Football Championship. It was the team's first victory at the tournament after finishing as runners-up four times previously.

== Recruitment ==
Because of their military status, they are not allowed to sign any foreign players. All players undergo military training and three years of mandatory service, after which they can apply for long-term service.

Sangmu previously participated in the WK League new players' draft along with the other WK League clubs. In 2015, the team used their first place position in the draft to select Korea international Choe Yu-ri, but Choe refused to join the team, considering it an infringement of her freedom to choose a career. In response to Choe's protest, the Korea Women's Football Federation revised the rules so that only willing applicants could be selected by the military team.

From 2016, players had an opportunity to apply to join Sangmu ahead of the main draft, and any players not picked by the team were automatically included in the draft.

== Stadium ==
Although the team was originally based in Busan, when the WK League instituted a home-and-away system for the first time in the 2015 season Sangmu could not reach an agreement with the local government in Busan. Although the team was known as Busan Sangmu, they played their home matches at Boeun Public Stadium in North Chungcheong Province. From the 2016 season onwards the team officially relocated to Boeun and changed their name accordingly, continuing to use the same stadium.

The team moved again in 2023 to Mungyeong in North Gyeongsang Province, using Mungyeong Civic Stadium as their home ground. The multi-purpose stadium was built in 1983 and has a total capacity of 4,959, although not all seating is used during WK League matches. The stadium does not have floodlights, so Mungyeong Sangmu's home matches are held in the afternoon, rather than in the evening in line with other WK League fixtures. The electronic scoreboard was replaced in 2024, and Mungyeong City expressed the intention to install floodlights ahead of the 2025 season to allow for evening matches and improve the atmosphere at home matches.

== Current squad ==
As of 6 March 2026

Note: Flags indicate national team as defined under FIFA eligibility rules; some limited exceptions apply. Players may hold more than one non-FIFA nationality.

No.	Pos.	Nation	Player
4	DF	KOR	Seo In-gyeong (vice-captain)
6	DF	KOR	Kim Ji-won
7	DF	KOR	Song Da-hui
8	MF	KOR	Kwon Hah-nul (captain)
9	FW	KOR	Yang Seo-young
10	FW	KOR	Kwon Da-eun
12	MF	KOR	Park Yea-na
13	FW	KOR	Kim Hye-jeong (vice-captain)
14	FW	KOR	Lee A-reum
15	MF	KOR	Jung Eun-jin
16	DF	KOR	Yoon Chae-hyun

No.	Pos.	Nation	Player
17	DF	KOR	Park Hyun-a
18	GK	KOR	Jo A-ra
19	FW	KOR	Kim Tae-yang
20	DF	KOR	Jeon Min-ju
21	MF	KOR	Noh Jin-young
22	DF	KOR	Lee Sun-bin
23	GK	KOR	Ha Ji-hee
24	DF	KOR	Byun Hye-jin
27	MF	KOR	Lee Se-ran
28	DF	KOR	Kim Ryun-gyeong
29	GK	KOR	Lee Ha-gyeong

== Honours ==
- World Military Women's Football Championship
  - Winners (1): 2023
  - Runners-up (4): 2009, 2010, 2012, 2018

== Season-by-season records ==
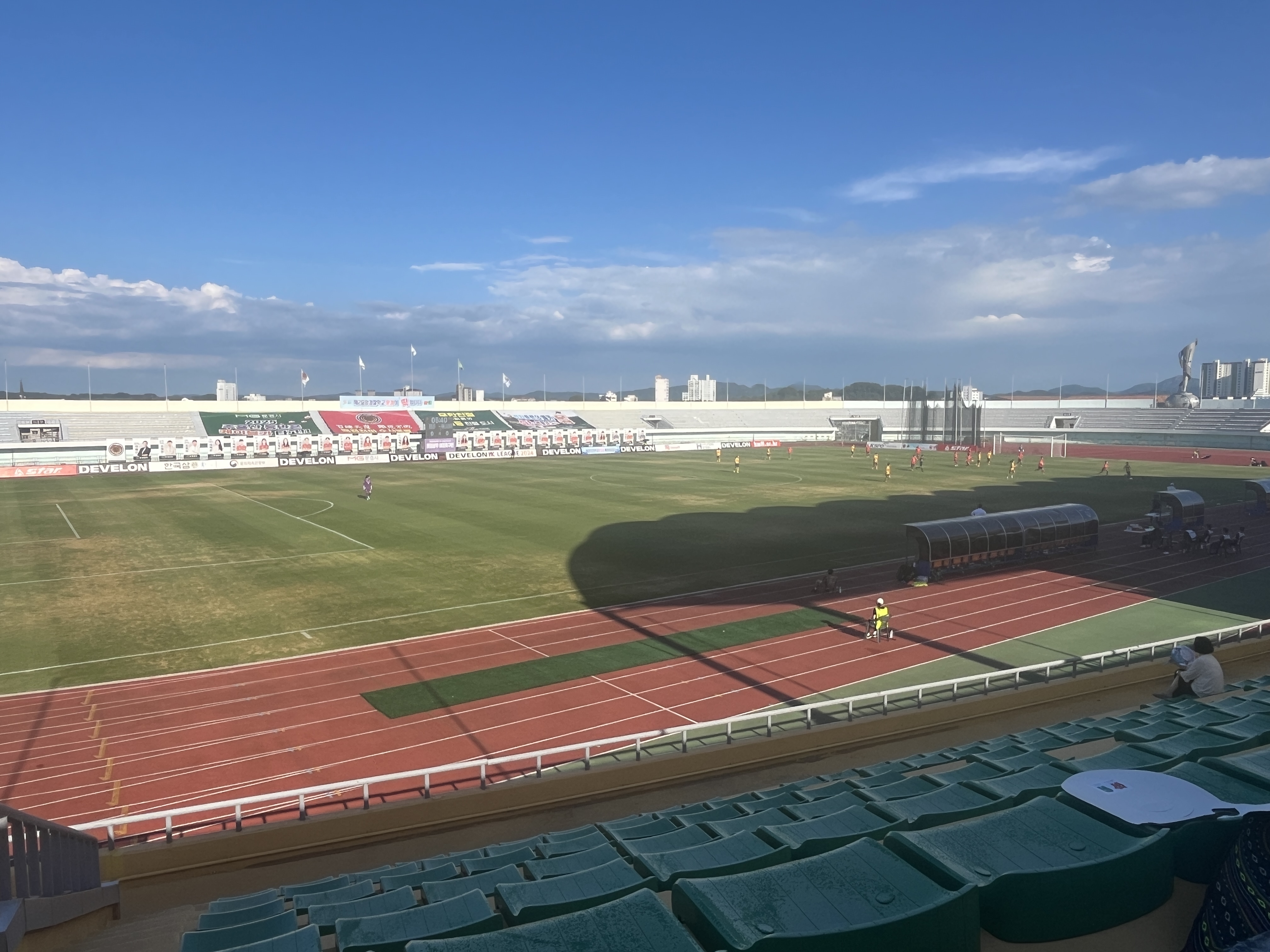
Mungyeong Sangmu play in a WK League match against Sejong Sportstoto at Mungyeong Civic Stadium

Season	WK League regular season								Playoffs
Season	P	W	D	L	GF	GA	Pts	Pos.	Playoffs
2009	20	4	6	10	21	39	18	5th	Did not qualify
2010	20	3	3	14	24	42	12	6th	Did not qualify
2011	21	11	2	8	30	32	35	4th	Did not qualify
2012	21	2	4	15	25	53	10	8th	Did not qualify
2013	24	2	7	15	22	43	13	7th	Did not qualify
2014	24	4	6	14	23	45	18	6th	Did not qualify
2015	24	3	2	19	22	66	11	7th	Did not qualify
2016	24	1	5	18	13	53	8	7th	Did not qualify
2017	28	3	4	21	22	63	13	8th	Did not qualify
2018	28	3	7	18	18	59	16	7th	Did not qualify
2019	28	8	6	14	22	36	30	6th	Did not qualify
2020	21	2	1	18	21	52	7	8th	Did not qualify
2021	21	5	7	9	16	30	22	6th	Did not qualify
2022	21	4	4	13	16	35	16	6th	Did not qualify
2023	21	5	6	10	20	38	21	6th	Did not qualify
2024	28	4	7	17	24	45	19	7th	Did not qualify
2025	28	8	8	12	35	37	32	6th	Did not qualify
2026	28	12	3	13	30	34	39	4th	Did not qualify
