= Gangjin Swans WFC =

South Korean women's football team

- Full name: Gangjin Swans Women's Football Club
- Founded: 2018; 8 years ago (as Changnyeong WFC)
- Ground: Gangjin Yeongrang Stadium
- Chairman: Ahn Myung-seok
- Head coach: Go Hyun-ho
- League: WK League
- 2026: WK League, 8th of 8
| Home colours | Away colours |

Gangjin Swans Women's Football Club (Korean: 강진 스완스 WFC) is a South Korean women's football team based in Gangjin County. Established in 2018 as Changnyeong WFC, the team plays in the WK League, the top division of women's football in South Korea.

== History ==
=== Foundation ===
The foundation of a new women's football team to be based in Changnyeong County was announced in late 2017, with the objective of developing women's football and maintaining the eight-team system in the WK League following the dissolution of Icheon Daekyo. Former Icheon manager Shin Sang-woo was appointed as Changnyeong WFC's first manager, and the Korea Women's Football Federation allowed the club two priority picks at the beginning of the 2018 WK League draft. Thanks to this special consideration, the newly established club was able to sign two of the most sought-after talents in the draft, South Korea internationals Son Hwa-yeon and Hong Hye-ji, along with seven other rookie draftees. Changnyeong also acquired three former Icheon players, three free agents and a small number of other rookies, starting their first league season with a squad of only 19 players. This barely met the league's minimum requirement of 18 players, and any players getting injured would have caused them difficulties in managing their games.

Changnyeong played their first league match away against Suwon FMC. Their first home match took place on 30 April 2018 against Incheon Hyundai Steel.

=== Poor performance and financial difficulties ===
After finishing at the bottom of the league for two years in a row, the club attempted to bolster its squad ahead of the 2020 season, recruiting a number of experienced players including former Japan international Nanase Kiryu. The influx of talent helped the team reach their highest ever finish, ending the season in fifth place. However, Changnyeong were unable to build on this momentum, scoring only nine points to finish bottom of the table once again in 2021. The trend of poor performance continued as the club faced increasing financial pressure. Despite increased financial contributions from Changnyeong County, subsidies provided by the Ministry of Culture, Sports and Tourism to the Korean Women's Football Federation to fund league operations steadily decreased from 2021 to 2023. In 2024, with the existence of the league itself under threat, Changnyeong WFC's future was also called into question due to financial difficulties and low attendance. Even the signing of star striker and South Korea international Lee Eun-young was not enough to save Changnyeong from eighth place in the league, and the lowest attendance of all WK League clubs in 2024.

=== Relocation to Gangjin ===
After the 106th National Sports Festival, the club was rebranded as Gangjin Swans WFC and relocated to Gangjin County, South Jeolla Province, starting with the 2026 season.

== Stadium ==
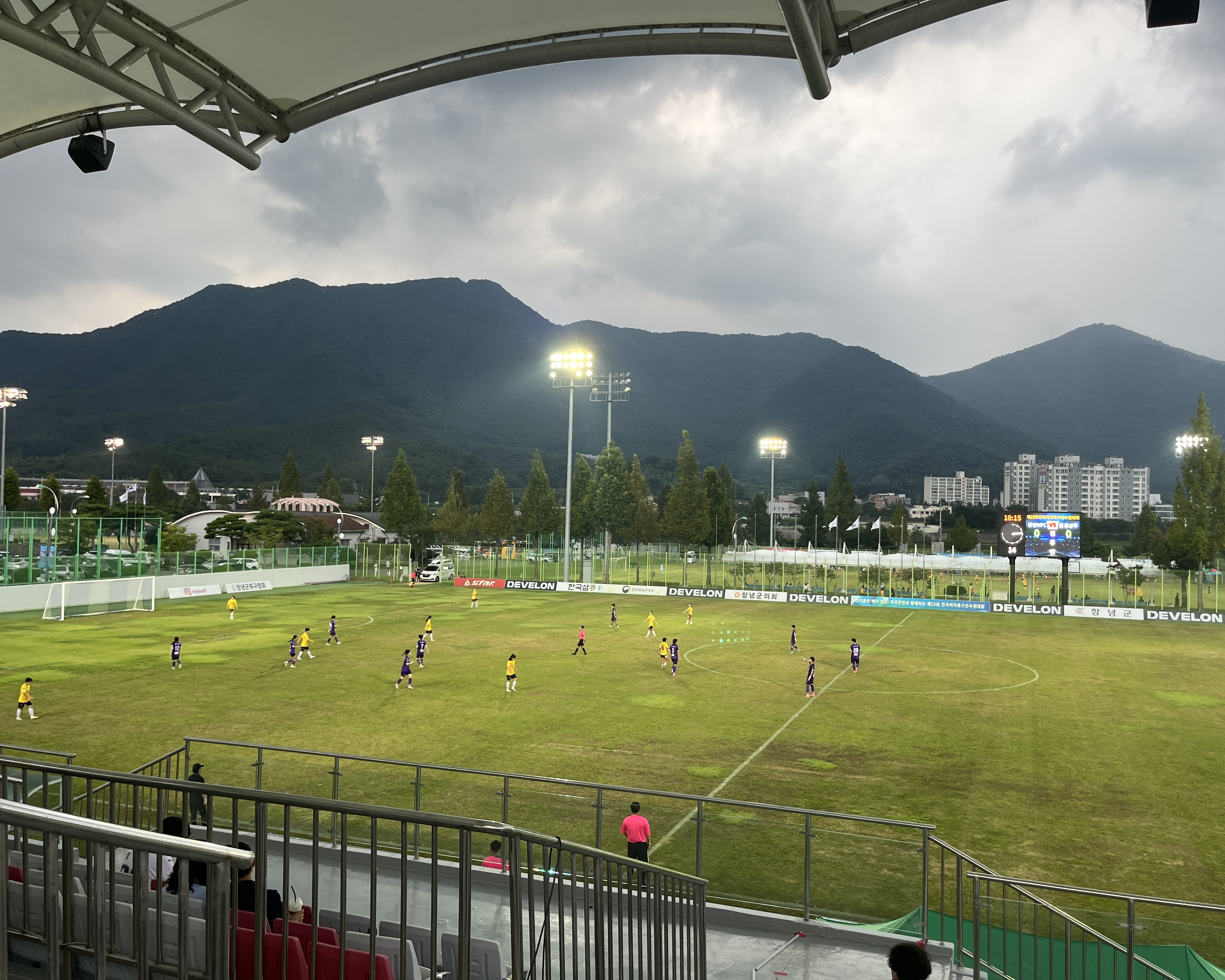
The main grass pitch at Changnyeong Sports Park

Between 2018 and 2025, the club played their home fixtures at Changnyeong Sports Park in Bugok. Changnyeong WFC had priority access to the facility's grass pitches, artificial pitches and health centre, with the club's former manager Ahn Tae-hwa describing it as the "best environment in [Korean] women's football". By the time the club relocated in 2026, the facility had hosted the National Women's Football Tournament for five consecutive years (2021 to 2025).

== Current squad ==
As of 2 November 2026

Note: Flags indicate national team as defined under FIFA eligibility rules; some limited exceptions apply. Players may hold more than one non-FIFA nationality.

| No. | Pos. | Nation | Player |
|---|---|---|---|
| 1 | GK | KOR | Kim Ye-rin |
| 3 | DF | KOR | Jung Seol-a |
| 4 | DF | KOR | Gu Ka-ram |
| 5 | MF | KOR | Kim Hye-yeong |
| 6 | DF | KOR | Noh Hye-yeon |
| 7 | DF | KOR | Lee Si-ho |
| 8 | MF | KOR | Kim Eun-joo |
| 9 | FW | KOR | Lee Yeong-seo |
| 10 | MF | KOR | Lee So-hee |
| 11 | FW | KOR | Son Hwa-yeon |
| 12 | DF | KOR | Lee Ye-sol |
| 13 | DF | KOR | Kim Kyu-yeon |
| 14 | FW | KOR | Kwak Ro-young |
| 15 | DF | KOR | Lee Hyo-kyeong (captain) |

| No. | Pos. | Nation | Player |
|---|---|---|---|
| 16 | DF | KOR | Go Da-ae |
| 17 | DF | KOR | Lee Deok-ju |
| 18 | GK | KOR | Kang Ji-yeon |
| 19 | MF | KOR | Kim Seong-mi |
| 20 | MF | KOR | Choi Eun-hyoung |
| 21 | GK | KOR | Do Yoon-ji |
| 22 | MF | KOR | Yang Eun-seo |
| 23 | FW | KOR | Hwang A-hyun |
| 25 | MF | KOR | Yoon Yu-ri |
| 26 | DF | KOR | Hong Seong-yeon |
| 27 | FW | KOR | Park Ga-hyun |
| 31 | GK | KOR | Kim Soo-rin |
| 33 | MF | KOR | Go Da-young |
| 47 | FW | KOR | Kang Chae-rim |

== Coaching staff ==
As of 6 March 2026

- Head coach: (South Korea) Go Hyun-ho
- Coach: (South Korea) Jeon Hyeong-chan
- Goalkeeping coach: (South Korea) Yeo Myung-yong
- Physical coach: (South Korea) Maeng Chang-yoon
- Trainer: (South Korea) Kim Soo-ha

== Season-by-season records ==
| Season | WK League regular season | | | | | | | | Playoffs |
| Season | P | W | D | L | GF | GA | Pts | Pos. | Playoffs |
|---|---|---|---|---|---|---|---|---|---|
| 2018 | 28 | 3 | 3 | 22 | 30 | 80 | 12 | 8th | Did not qualify |
| 2019 | 28 | 1 | 6 | 21 | 15 | 71 | 9 | 8th | Did not qualify |
| 2020 | 21 | 7 | 5 | 9 | 33 | 41 | 26 | 5th | Did not qualify |
| 2021 | 21 | 1 | 6 | 14 | 19 | 47 | 9 | 8th | Did not qualify |
| 2022 | 21 | 5 | 1 | 15 | 20 | 42 | 16 | 7th | Did not qualify |
| 2023 | 21 | 3 | 5 | 13 | 15 | 37 | 14 | 8th | Did not qualify |
| 2024 | 28 | 2 | 5 | 21 | 11 | 47 | 11 | 8th | Did not qualify |
| 2025 | 28 | 2 | 4 | 22 | 17 | 66 | 10 | 8th | Did not qualify |
| 2026 | 28 | 4 | 6 | 18 | 23 | 52 | 18 | 8th | Did not qualify |
