= Son Hwa-yeon =

South Korean footballer (born 1997)

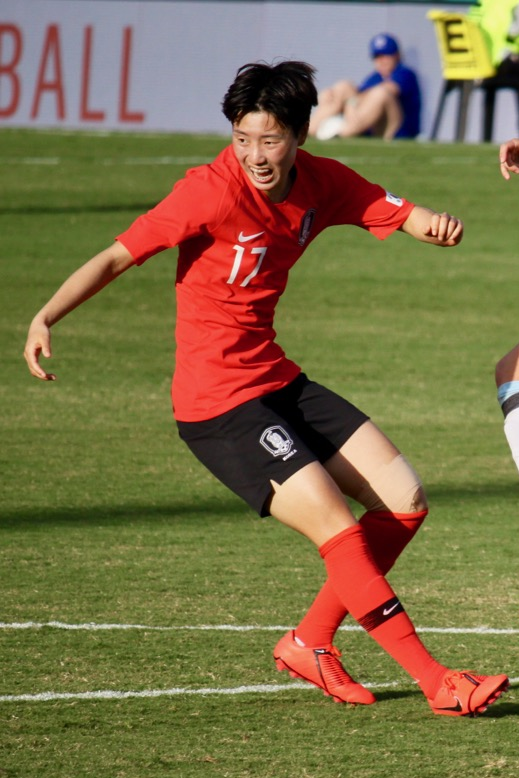
- Son in 2019

Personal information
- Date of birth: 15 March 1997 (age 29)
- Place of birth: South Korea
- Height: 1.68 m (5 ft 6 in)
- Position: Striker

Team information
- Current team: Gangjin Swans
- Number: 11

Youth career
- Korea University

Senior career*
Years	Team	Apps	(Gls)
2018–2020	Changnyeong WFC		
2021–2024	Incheon Hyundai Steel Red Angels		
2024–2025	AIK Fotboll	14	(0)
2026–	Gangjin Swans		

International career^{‡}
2013	South Korea U17	4	(0)
2015	South Korea U20	5	(4)
2016–	South Korea	69	(15)
Medal record
Women's football
Representing South Korea
Asian Games
Bronze medal – third place	2018 Jakarta–Palembang	Team
Bronze medal – third place	2026 Aichi–Nagoya	Team
- * Club domestic league appearances and goals as of 13 February 2026 ‡ National team caps and goals as of 2 October 2026

- Son Hwa-yeon
- Hangul: 손화연
- RR: Son Hwayeon
- MR: Son Hwayŏn

Son Hwa-yeon (Korean: 손화연; born 15 March 1997) is a South Korean footballer who plays as a striker for WK League club Gangjin Swans and the South Korea national team.

== Club career ==
On 27 December 2017, Son was drafted second overall in the 2018 WK League Draft by Changnyeong WFC. On 23 April 2018, she made her debut in a 1–0 away loss to Suwon UDC. On 30 April 2018, she scored her first goal in a 4–2 home loss to Incheon Hyundai Steel Red Angels. She transferred to Swedish first tier side AIK Fotboll in July 2024.

== International career ==
Son scored four goals at the 2015 AFC U-19 Women's Championship, helping South Korea finish third and qualify for the 2016 FIFA U-20 Women's World Cup. On 4 June 2016, she scored twice on her senior debut, in a 5–0 win over Myanmar. On 3 July 2017, she was named in the squad for the 2017 Summer Universiade; she went on to score three times in the tournament.

== Career statistics ==
=== International ===
Scores and results list South Korea's goal tally first, score column indicates score after each Son goal.

List of international goals scored by Son Hwa-yeon
No.	Date	Venue	Opponent	Score	Result	Competition
1	4 June 2016	Thuwunna Stadium, Yangon, Myanmar	Myanmar	4–0	5–0	Friendly
2	4 June 2016	Thuwunna Stadium, Yangon, Myanmar	Myanmar	5–0	5–0	Friendly
3	19 August 2018	Gelora Sriwijaya Stadium, Palembang, Indonesia	Maldives	3–0	8–0	2018 Asian Games
4	19 August 2018	Gelora Sriwijaya Stadium, Palembang, Indonesia	Maldives	6–0	8–0	2018 Asian Games
5	19 August 2018	Gelora Sriwijaya Stadium, Palembang, Indonesia	Maldives	7–0	8–0	2018 Asian Games
6	21 August 2018	Gelora Sriwijaya Stadium, Palembang, Indonesia	Indonesia	7–0	12–0	2018 Asian Games
7	28 February 2019	Leichhardt Oval, Sydney, Australia	Argentina	2–0	5–0	2019 Cup of Nations
8	3 February 2022	Shree Shiv Chhatrapati Sports Complex, Pune, India	Philippines	2–0	2–0	2022 AFC Women's Asian Cup
9	25 September 2023	Wenzhou Sports Centre, Wenzhou, China	Philippines	2–1	5–1	2022 Asian Games
10	25 September 2023	Wenzhou Sports Centre, Wenzhou, China	Philippines	4–1	5–1	2022 Asian Games
11	25 September 2023	Wenzhou Sports Centre, Wenzhou, China	Philippines	5–1	5–1	2022 Asian Games
12	27 February 2024	Estádio António Coimbra da Mota, Estoril, Portugal	Portugal	1–5	1–5	Friendly
13	14 March 2026	Stadium Australia, Sydney, Australia	Uzbekistan	1–0	6–0	2026 AFC Women's Asian Cup
14	3 June 2026	GFA National Training Center, Dededo, Guam	Guam	2–0	5–0	2028 EAFF E-1 Football Championship preliminary round
15	3 June 2026	GFA National Training Center, Dededo, Guam	Guam	4–0	5–0	2028 EAFF E-1 Football Championship preliminary round
