= Gyeongju Korea Hydro & Nuclear Power WFC =

South Korean women's football club

Gyeongju KHNP WFC
- Full name: Gyeongju Korea Hydro & Nuclear Power WFC
- Founded: 2017; 9 years ago
- Ground: Gyeongju Football Park
- Capacity: 650
- Manager: Park Nam-yeol
- League: WK League
- 2026: Regular season: 3rd of 8 Playoffs: Champions
- Website: khnpfc.co.kr
Home colours	Away colours

Gyeongju Korea Hydro and Nuclear Power Women's Football Club (Korean: 경주 한국수력원자력 여자 축구단), also known as Gyeongju KHNP WFC, is a South Korean women's football club. The club was founded by Korea Hydro & Nuclear Power in 2017 and competes in the WK League. They play their home games at Gyeongju Football Park.

== History ==
=== Foundation ===
Korea Hydro & Nuclear Power FC, a men's team competing in the National League, had moved to Gyeongju in 2013. In October 2016, the president of Korea Hydro & Nuclear Power Co., Ltd and the mayor of Gyeongju announced the formation of an attached women's team.

The team was formally founded in March 2017 with 27 players and 5 coaches, including manager Ha Keum-jin, who had previously coached the under-20 women's national team in 2014 and the under-16 women's national team in 2015. They played their first match on 17 April 2017 against Boeun Sangmu.

=== Departure of Ha Keum-jin and KFA investigation ===
After finishing the 2017 season in seventh place, Gyeongju KHNP finished in second place in the regular league in 2018. Amid speculation over the sudden departure of manager Ha Keum-jin due to "personal reasons", the team beat Suwon FMC in the playoff semi-final to qualify for the two-legged championship final against Incheon Hyundai Steel. Despite leading 3–0 after the first leg at home, the final ended as a 4–4 draw on aggregate, and Gyeongju lost 3–1 in a penalty shoot-out to finish as league runners-up.

In early 2019, the club was investigated by the Korea Football Association after accusations of sexual misconduct by former manager Ha Keum-jin. After it emerged that the real reason for Ha's mid-season departure in 2018 was a dismissal due to sexual violence against a player at the club, KHNP was accused of a cover-up. The club denied this allegation. Following reports that Ha had previously been dismissed from the KFA in January 2016 due to sexual harassment, the Korea Women's Football Federation stated that Gyeongju KHNP had been unaware of this fact when they hired him the following year.

=== Chasing the WK League title ===
The 2019 season finished with Gyeongju and Suwon FMC in second and third place respectively, leading to a replay of the previous year's playoff semi-final. This time, Suwon won 2–0 and progressed to the final against Incheon Hyundai Steel. In December 2019, the club announced Song Ju-hee as its new manager.

From 2020 to 2022, the same three teams again finished at the top of the league table, with Gyeongju defeating Suwon to progress to the final against Incheon Hyundai Steel but ultimately finishing as runners-up in all three years. They finished the 2023 season in fourth place. The following year, they finished the regular league in third position and once again met Suwon FC (formerly Suwon FMC) in the playoff, which ended as a draw after extra time. Gyeongju lost 5–4 in the resulting penalty shoot-out after Jang Sel-gi's attempt was blocked by goalkeeper Kim Kyung-hee. After a disappointing 2025 season that saw KHNP finish in fourth place despite being tipped by some as title favourites, manager Song Ju-hee departed the club and was replaced by Park Nam-yeol ahead of the 2026 season.

== Colours and badge ==
Gyeongju KHNP play in green at home and white away from home. The club emblem comprises a shield, representing the history of the city of Gyeongju, and a circle representing Korea Hydro & Nuclear Power. The emblem also features the mythical winged horse Chunma, signifying the club's relentless energy and attacking play. The club mascot is also a winged horse, named 'Hantori', a portmanteau of the club's name in Korean and the word 'victory'.

== Stadium ==
Gyeongju play their home games at Gyeongju Football Park, located within Gyeongju's Hwangseong Park. The team plays on Pitch 3, which has a capacity of 650.

== Current squad ==
As of 10 April 2026

Note: Flags indicate national team as defined under FIFA eligibility rules; some limited exceptions apply. Players may hold more than one non-FIFA nationality.

No.	Pos.	Nation	Player
1	GK	KOR	Jo Eui-jung
2	DF	KOR	Kim Jin-hui
5	DF	KOR	Son Da-seul
6	DF	KOR	Yang Da-min
7	MF	KOR	Kim Hye-ji
8	MF	KOR	Kim Yun-ji
9	FW	JPN	Mai Kyokawa
10	FW	KOR	Kim Sang-eun
11	FW	KOR	Hyun Seul-gi
12	DF	KOR	Kwak Min-jeong
13	MF	KOR	Ko Da-young
14	MF	KOR	Jeon Eun-ha (vice-captain)
15	MF	KOR	Oh Seo-yeon
16	DF	KOR	Jang Sel-gi (captain)

No.	Pos.	Nation	Player
17	MF	KOR	Lee Young-ju
18	GK	KOR	Kim Do-hyun
19	DF	KOR	Koo Chae-hyun
20	DF	KOR	Kim Hye-yeong
22	DF	KOR	Jeong Yeong-a
23	DF	KOR	Hong Hye-ji
24	GK	KOR	Jeon Ha-neul
26	MF	KOR	Jung Yoo-jin
27	FW	KOR	Moon Mi-ra (vice-captain)
28	DF	KOR	Um Min-gyeong
30	FW	KOR	Park Yoo-jeong
33	MF	KOR	Kang Eun-young
35	MF	JPN	Emi Nakajima
99	FW	USA	Rebekah Valdez

== Backroom staff ==
=== Coaching staff ===
- Manager: (South Korea) Park Nam-yeol
- Head coach: (South Korea) Song Yu-na
- Coach: (South Korea) Park Ji-young
- Goalkeeping coach: (South Korea) Kwon Ki-bo
- Fitness coach: (South Korea) Jang Ji-seok
- Medical trainer: (South Korea) Yang Min-ji

Source: Official website

== Honours ==
- WK League
  - Winners (1): 2026
  - Runners-up (4): 2018, 2020, 2021, 2022
- National Women's Football Championship
  - Winners (1): 2022
  - Runners-up (2): 2021, 2025

== Season-by-season records ==
Season	WK League regular season								Playoffs
Season	P	W	D	L	GF	GA	Pts	Pos.	Playoffs
2017	28	5	6	17	23	53	21	7th	Did not qualify
2018	28	16	5	7	54	35	53	2nd	Runners-up
2019	28	14	7	7	62	35	49	2nd	Semifinal
2020	21	17	3	1	43	13	54	2nd	Runners-up
2021	21	16	3	2	59	17	51	2nd	Runners-up
2022	21	15	4	2	46	21	49	2nd	Runners-up
2023	21	9	6	6	25	21	33	4th	Did not qualify
2024	28	14	9	5	54	36	51	3rd	Semifinal
2025	28	12	7	9	47	38	43	4th	Did not qualify
2026	28	11	7	10	43	33	40	3rd	Champions

== See also ==
- Gyeongju Korea Hydro & Nuclear Power FC
