= Josée Nahi =

Ivorian footballer (born 1989)

Personal information
- Full name: Estelle Marie Josée Nahi
- Date of birth: 29 May 1989 (age 37)
- Place of birth: Diégonéfla, Ivory Coast
- Height: 1.71 m (5 ft 7 in)
- Position: Forward

Senior career*
Years	Team	Apps	(Gls)
- Spartak Subotica
2014–2015	Zvezda 2005 Perm	23	(8)
2016	Rossiyanka	11	(4)
2017	Arna-Bjørnar	20	(7)
2018–2022	Gyeongju KHNP		
2023–2024	Suwon FC		

International career
- Ivory Coast
- * Club domestic league appearances and goals

Estelle Marie Josée Nahi (born 29 May 1989), known as Josée Nahi, is an Ivorian professional footballer who plays as a forward. She was part of the Ivorian squad for the 2015 FIFA Women's World Cup.

== See also ==
- List of Ivory Coast women's international footballers
