= Kim Yun-ji (footballer) =

South Korean footballer (born 1989)

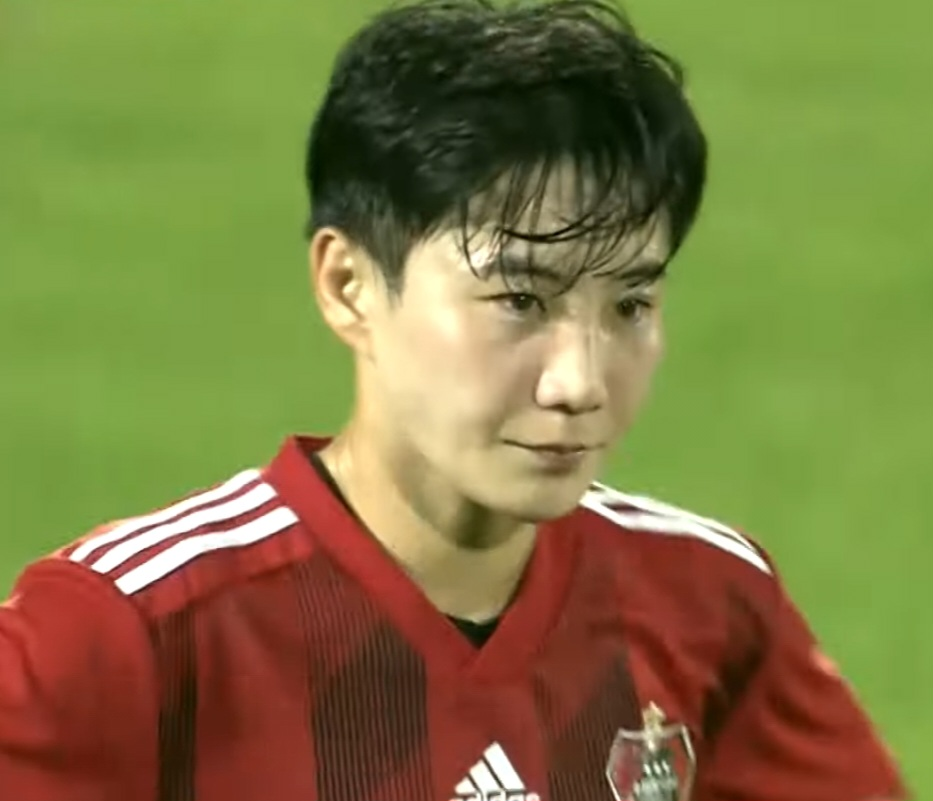

Personal information
- Date of birth: 1 June 1989 (age 37)
- Place of birth: Ulsan, Gyeongsangnam-do, South Korea
- Height: 1.65 m (5 ft 5 in)
- Position: Midfielder

Team information
- Current team: Gyeongju KHNP

Youth career
- 2008-2009: Ulsan College

Senior career*
Years	Team	Apps	(Gls)
2010-2013	Incheon Hyundai		
2014-2024	Suwon FC		
2025-	Gyeongju KHNP		

International career^{‡}
2007	South Korea U-20	11	(0)
2008-	South Korea	11	(0)
- * Club domestic league appearances and goals ‡ National team caps and goals as of 03:45, 27 July 2026 (UTC)

Kim Yun-ji (born June 1, 1989) is a South Korean footballer who plays as a midfielder for Gyeongju KHNP and the South Korea women's national football team. She was selected to the 2023 FIFA Women's World Cup South Korean squad.

== Club career ==
Kim started playing for Ulsan College in 2008. She made her WK League debut in 2010, playing for Incheon Hyundai Steel Red Angels WFC. She went on to play for Suwon FC for eleven seasons starting in 2014. Kim scored the equaliser in the 2024 WK League championship playoff between Suwon and Gyeongju, leading to a penalty shootout, which Suwon won. The club went on to win the championship final and lift the WK League trophy. The following year, Kim transferred to Gyeongju KHNP.

== International career ==
Kim made her senior debut for South Korea in November 2008, appearing in a friendly match against the U.S.A. She made only a few international appearances before being dropped from the squad, returning after an absence of ten years ahead of the 2019 FIFA Women's World Cup. However, a hamstring injury sustained in training caused her to miss out on the tournament. Kim was called up in South Korea's final squad for the 2023 FIFA Women's World Cup.

== Honours ==
=== Incheon Hyundai Steel Red Angels ===
- WK League
  - Champions: 2013

=== Suwon FC ===
- WK League
  - Champions: 2024
