= Asuna Tanaka =

Japanese footballer

Asuna Tanaka 田中 明日菜
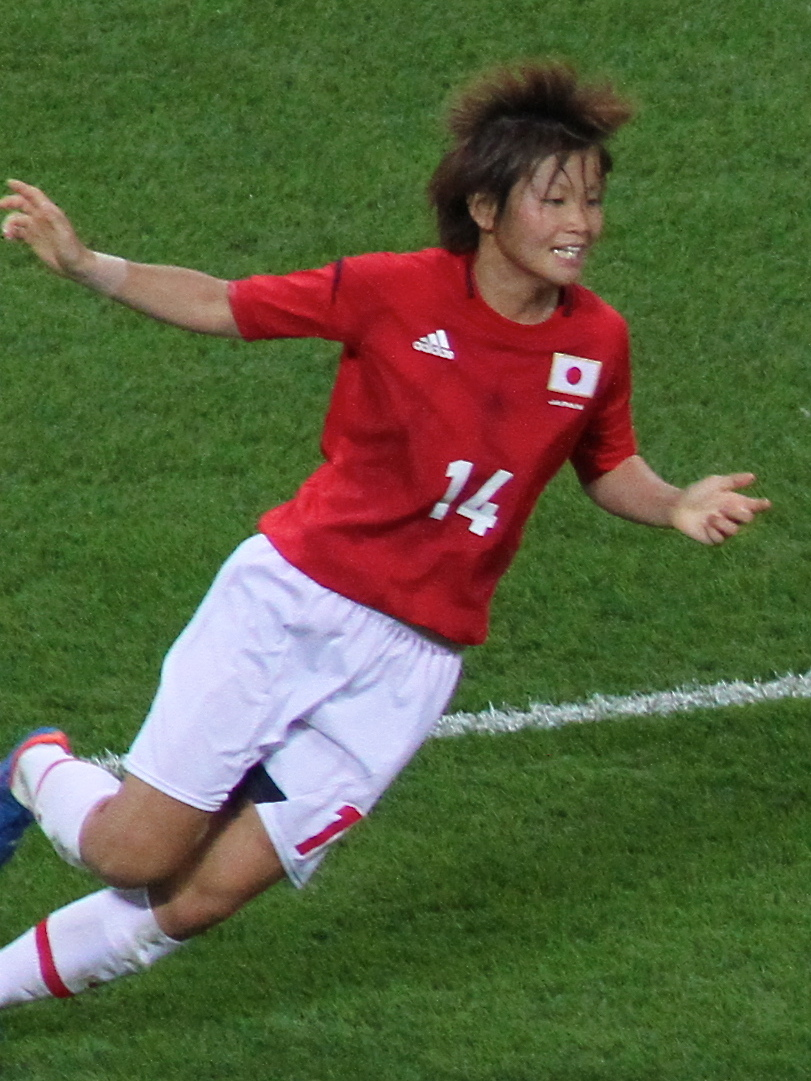
- Tanaka in 2012

Personal information
- Full name: Asuna Tanaka
- Date of birth: 23 April 1988 (age 38)
- Place of birth: Sakai, Osaka, Japan
- Height: 1.64 m (5 ft 4 1/2 in)
- Position: Midfielder

Team information
- Current team: Hwacheon KSPO WFC
- Number: 4

Youth career
- 2004–2006: Tokiwagi Gakuen High School

Senior career*
Years	Team	Apps	(Gls)
2007–2008	Tasaki Perule FC	32	(2)
2009–2013	INAC Kobe Leonessa	80	(15)
2013–2014	Frankfurt	22	(1)
2014–2017	INAC Kobe Leonessa	39	(3)
2018–2023	Gyeongju KHNP	35	(6)
2024-	Hwacheon KSPO WFC	6	(1)
Total		173	(21)

International career
2008	Japan U-20	4	(1)
2011–2016	Japan	39	(3)
Medal record
Tasaki Perule FC
Runner-up	Nadeshiko League	2007
Runner-up	Empress's Cup	2007
INAC Kobe Leonessa
Winner	Nadeshiko League	2011
Winner	Nadeshiko League	2012
Winner	Nadeshiko League	2013
Runner-up	Nadeshiko League	2016
Runner-up	Nadeshiko League	2017
Winner	Nadeshiko League Cup	2013
Runner-up	Nadeshiko League Cup	2012
Winner	Empress's Cup	2010
Winner	Empress's Cup	2011
Winner	Empress's Cup	2012
Winner	Empress's Cup	2013
Winner	Empress's Cup	2015
Winner	Empress's Cup	2016
Representing Japan
Olympic Games
Silver medal – second place	2012 London	Team
FIFA Women's World Cup
Gold medal – first place	2011 Germany
Silver medal – second place	2015 Canada
AFC U-19 Women's Championship
Silver medal – second place	2007 China
AFC U-16 Women's Championship
Gold medal – first place	2005 South Korea
- * Club domestic league appearances and goals as of 31 December 2017

Asuna Tanaka (田中 明日菜, Tanaka Asuna; born 23 April 1988) is a Japanese footballer who plays as a midfielder. She plays for Hwacheon KSPO WFC and has also played for the Japan national team.

== Club career ==
Tanaka was born in Sakai on 23 April 1988. After graduating from high school, she joined Tasaki Perule FC in 2007. However, the club was disbanded in 2008 due to financial strain. She moved to INAC Kobe Leonessa in 2009. She was selected Best Eleven in 2011 and 2012. She moved to German Bundesliga club Frankfurt in July 2013. In October 2014, she returned to INAC Kobe Leonessa. She moved to Korean WK League club Gyeongju KHNP.

== National team career ==
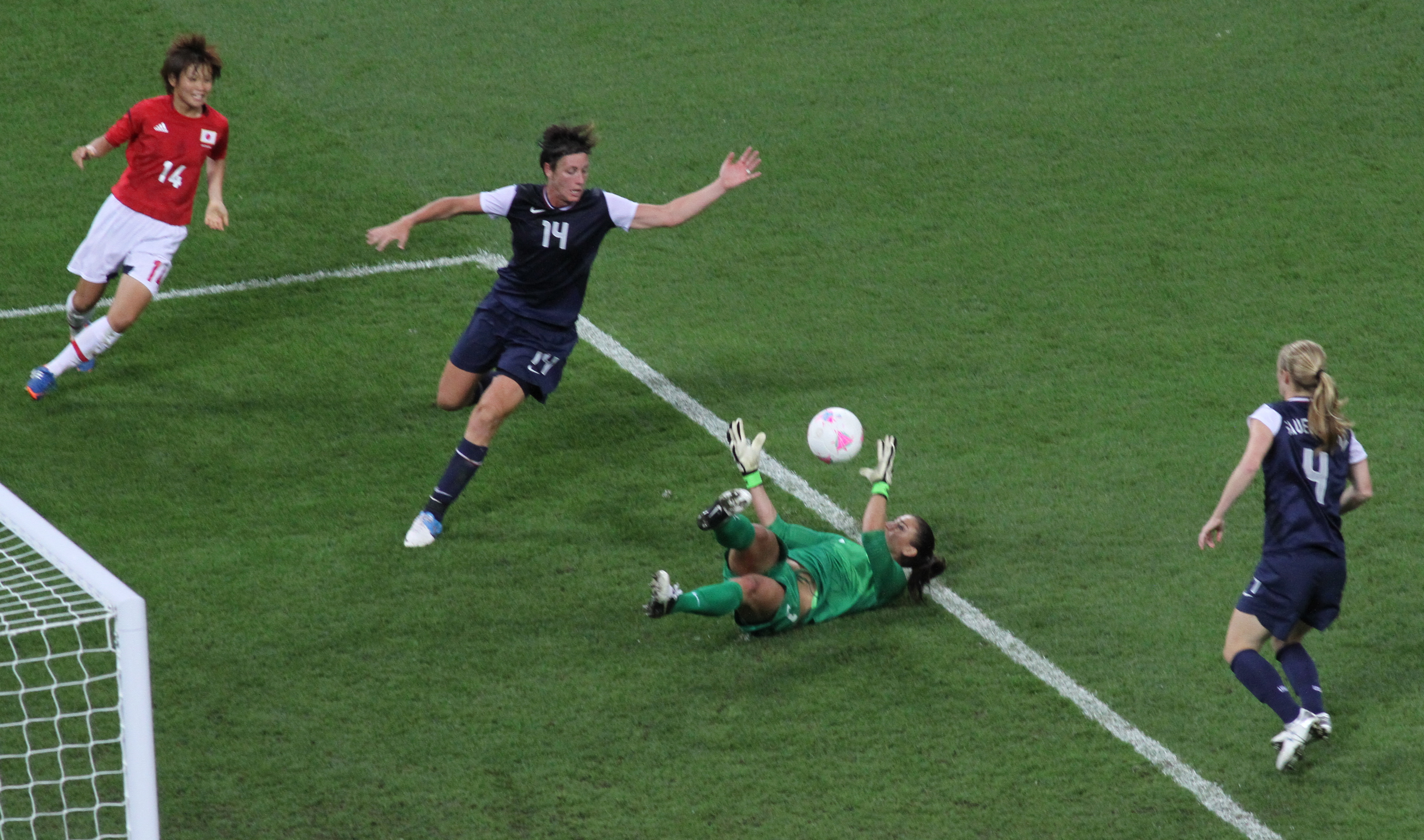
Gold medal match in 2012 London Olympics. Tanaka-red 14, Abby Wambach-blue 14, Hope Solo-1, Becky Sauerbrunn-4

In November 2008, Tanaka was selected by the Japan U-20 national team for the 2008 U-20 World Cup. In March 2011, Tanaka was selected by the Japan national team for the 2011 Algarve Cup. At this competition, on 4 March, she debuted against Finland. In July, she played at the 2011 World Cup as Japan won the championship. She also played at the 2012 Summer Olympics and the 2015 World Cup. Japan won 2nd place at both tournaments. She played 39 games and scored 3 goals for Japan until 2016.

== Club statistics ==
Club	Season	League		Cup		League Cup		Total	
Club	Season	Apps	Goals	Apps	Goals	Apps	Goals	Apps	Goals
Tasaki Perule FC	2007	13	0	3	0	3	0	19	0
Tasaki Perule FC	2008	19	2	3	0	—		22	2
Tasaki Perule FC	Total	32	2	6	0	3	0	41	2
INAC Kobe Leonessa	2009	19	4	3	1	—		22	5
INAC Kobe Leonessa	2010	18	5	4	2	5	1	27	8
INAC Kobe Leonessa	2011	16	4	4	1	—		20	5
INAC Kobe Leonessa	2012	18	1	4	1	6	0	28	2
INAC Kobe Leonessa	2013	9	1	—		3	0	12	1
INAC Kobe Leonessa	Total	80	15	15	5	14	1	109	21
Frankfurt	2013–14	18	1	4	0	—		22	1
Frankfurt	2014–15	4	0	1	1	1*	0*	6	1
Frankfurt	Total	22	1	5	1	1	0	28	2
Career total		134	18	26	6	18	1	178	25

*Champions League

== National team statistics ==
Japan national team
Year	Apps	Goals
2011	6	2
2012	13	1
2013	9	0
2014	2	0
2015	6	0
2016	3	0
Total	39	3

=== National team Goals ===
#	Date	Venue	Opponent	Score	Result	Competition
1.	1 September 2011	Jinan, China	Thailand	2–0	3–0	Football at the 2012 Summer Olympics Qualifiers
2.	11 September 2011	Jinan, China	China	1–0	1–0	Football at the 2012 Summer Olympics Qualifiers
3.	2 March 2012	Faro, Portugal	Germany	2–2	4–3	2012 Algarve Cup

== Honors ==
=== International ===
Japan National Team

- AFC U-17 Women's Championship

Champion: 2005

- FIFA Women's World Cup

Champion: 2011

=== Club ===
INAC Kobe Leonessa

- L.League

Champions: 2011, 2012

- Empress's Cup

Champions: 2010, 2011, 2012

- Japan and South Korea Women's League Championship

Champion: 2012

Frankfurt

- DFB-Pokal

Champion: 2013–14

=== Individual ===
- L.League Division 1

Best Eleven: 2011, 2012
