= Moon Mi-ra =

South Korean footballer (born 1992)

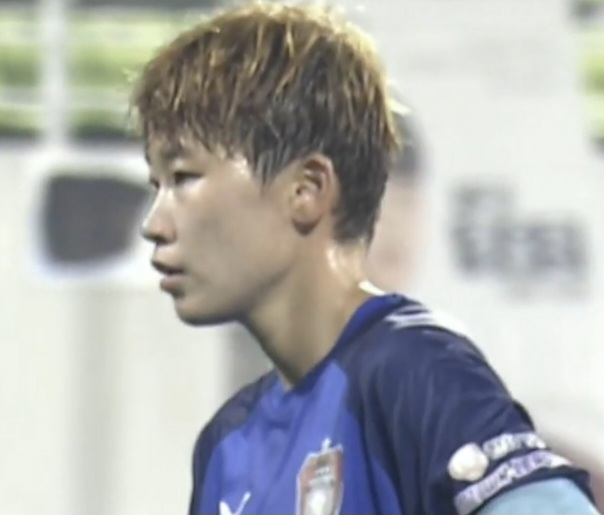

Personal information
- Date of birth: 28 February 1992 (age 34)
- Height: 1.65 m (5 ft 5 in)
- Position: Forward

Team information
- Current team: Gyeongju KHNP
- Number: 27

Youth career
- Yeoju Institute of Technology

Senior career*
Years	Team	Apps	(Gls)
2012–2014	Hyundai Steel Red Angels		
2015–2017	Icheon Daekyo		
2018–2024	Suwon FC		
2025–	Gyeongju KHNP		

International career^{‡}
2008–2012	South Korea U20	11	(5)
2016–	South Korea	45	(19)
- * Club domestic league appearances and goals ‡ National team caps and goals as of 7 April 2025

Moon Mi-ra (Korean: 문미라; born 28 February 1992) is a South Korean footballer who plays as a forward for Gyeongju KHNP and the South Korea national team.

== Club career ==
Incheon Hyundai Steel Red Angels selected Moon as their first choice draftee at the 2012 WK League draft, signing her on a three-year contract. She joined Icheon Daekyo in 2015 and became the first player in the WK League to score ten goals in one season. Following Icheon's disbandment in 2017, Moon signed with Suwon FMC, where she became known for her goal scoring ability, scoring ten or more goals in every season except 2020. She was the league's top goal scorer in 2022 and 2023. In July 2024, she scored twice in an away match against Seoul City, becoming the first player in history to have scored 100 goals in the WK League. As captain of Suwon FC Women, she led her team to their first league title since 2010 and was named as MVP in the second leg of the 2024 championship final. In January 2025, Gyeongju KHNP announced that they had signed Moon for the forthcoming season.

== International career ==
Moon played eleven matches for the South Korea under-20 team between 2008 and 2012, scoring five goals. She was a member of the squad that finished third in the 2010 FIFA U-20 Women's World Cup and reached the quarter-finals of the 2012 FIFA U-20 Women's World Cup. She made her full international debut on 4 June 2016 in a friendly against Myanmar and scored her first goal in her third cap against Guam on 8 November 2016.

She represented South Korea in several major tournaments, including the 2018 and 2022 Asian Games, where she scored several goals and helped the team win the bronze medal in 2018.

== Career statistics ==
=== International ===
Scores and results list South Korea's goal tally first, score column indicates score after each Moon goal.

List of international goals scored by Moon Mi-ra
No.	Date	Venue	Opponent	Score	Result	Competition
1	8 November 2016	Hong Kong Football Club Stadium, Hong Kong	Guam	2–0	13–0	2017 EAFF E-1 Football Championship
2	8 November 2016	Hong Kong Football Club Stadium, Hong Kong	Guam	4–0	13–0	2017 EAFF E-1 Football Championship
3	14 November 2016	Hong Kong Football Club Stadium, Hong Kong	Chinese Taipei	7–0	9–0	2017 EAFF E-1 Football Championship
4	19 August 2018	Gelora Sriwijaya Stadium, Palembang, Indonesia	Maldives	4–0	8–0	2018 Asian Games
5	19 August 2018	Gelora Sriwijaya Stadium, Palembang, Indonesia	Maldives	5–0	8–0	2018 Asian Games
6	21 August 2018	Gelora Sriwijaya Stadium, Palembang, Indonesia	Indonesia	2–0	12–0	2018 Asian Games
7	21 August 2018	Gelora Sriwijaya Stadium, Palembang, Indonesia	Indonesia	4–0	12–0	2018 Asian Games
8	24 August 2018	Gelora Sriwijaya Stadium, Palembang, Indonesia	Hong Kong	4–0	5–0	2018 Asian Games
9	31 August 2018	Gelora Sriwijaya Stadium, Palembang, Indonesia	Chinese Taipei	4–0	4–0	2018 Asian Games
10	28 February 2019	Leichhardt Oval, Sydney, Australia	Argentina	1–0	5–0	2019 Cup of Nations
11	6 March 2019	AAMI Park, Melbourne, Australia	New Zealand	2–0	2–0	2019 Cup of Nations
12	17 September 2021	Pakhtakor Stadium, Tashkent, Uzbekistan	Mongolia	9–0	12–0	2022 AFC Women's Asian Cup qualification
13	17 September 2021	Pakhtakor Stadium, Tashkent, Uzbekistan	Mongolia	10–0	12–0	2022 AFC Women's Asian Cup qualification
14	17 September 2021	Pakhtakor Stadium, Tashkent, Uzbekistan	Mongolia	12–0	12–0	2022 AFC Women's Asian Cup qualification
15	23 September 2021	Pakhtakor Stadium, Tashkent, Uzbekistan	Uzbekistan	3–0	4–0	2022 AFC Women's Asian Cup qualification
16	23 September 2021	Pakhtakor Stadium, Tashkent, Uzbekistan	Uzbekistan	4–0	4–0	2022 AFC Women's Asian Cup qualification
17	28 September 2023	Wenzhou Sports Centre, Wenzhou, China	Hong Kong	1–0	5–0	2022 Asian Games
18	28 September 2023	Wenzhou Sports Centre, Wenzhou, China	Hong Kong	2–0	5–0	2022 Asian Games
19	26 October 2023	Xiamen Egret Stadium, Xiamen, China	Thailand	9–0	10–1	2024 Olympic Games qualification
