= Gyeonggi Province =

Province of South Korea

- Province
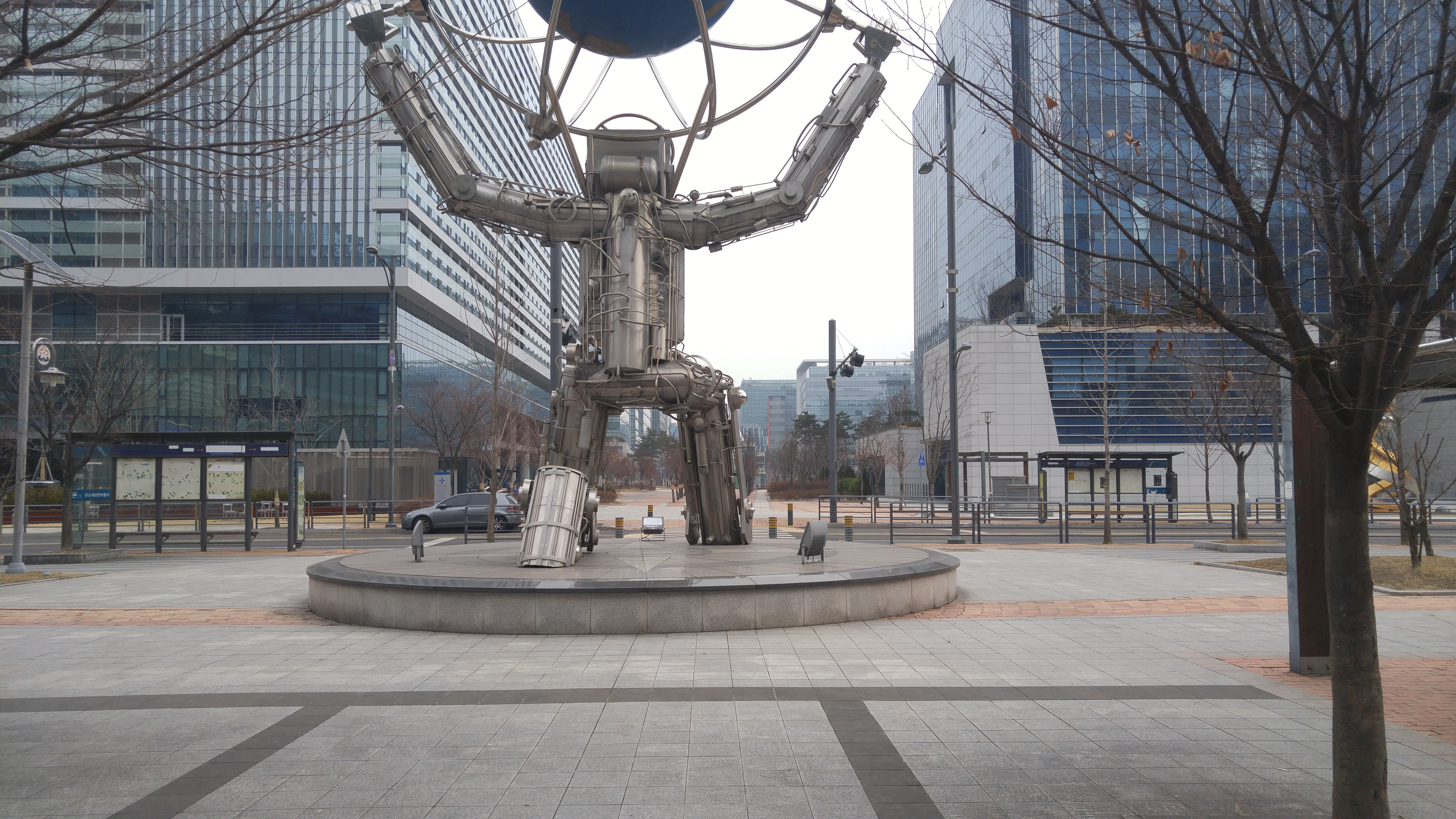
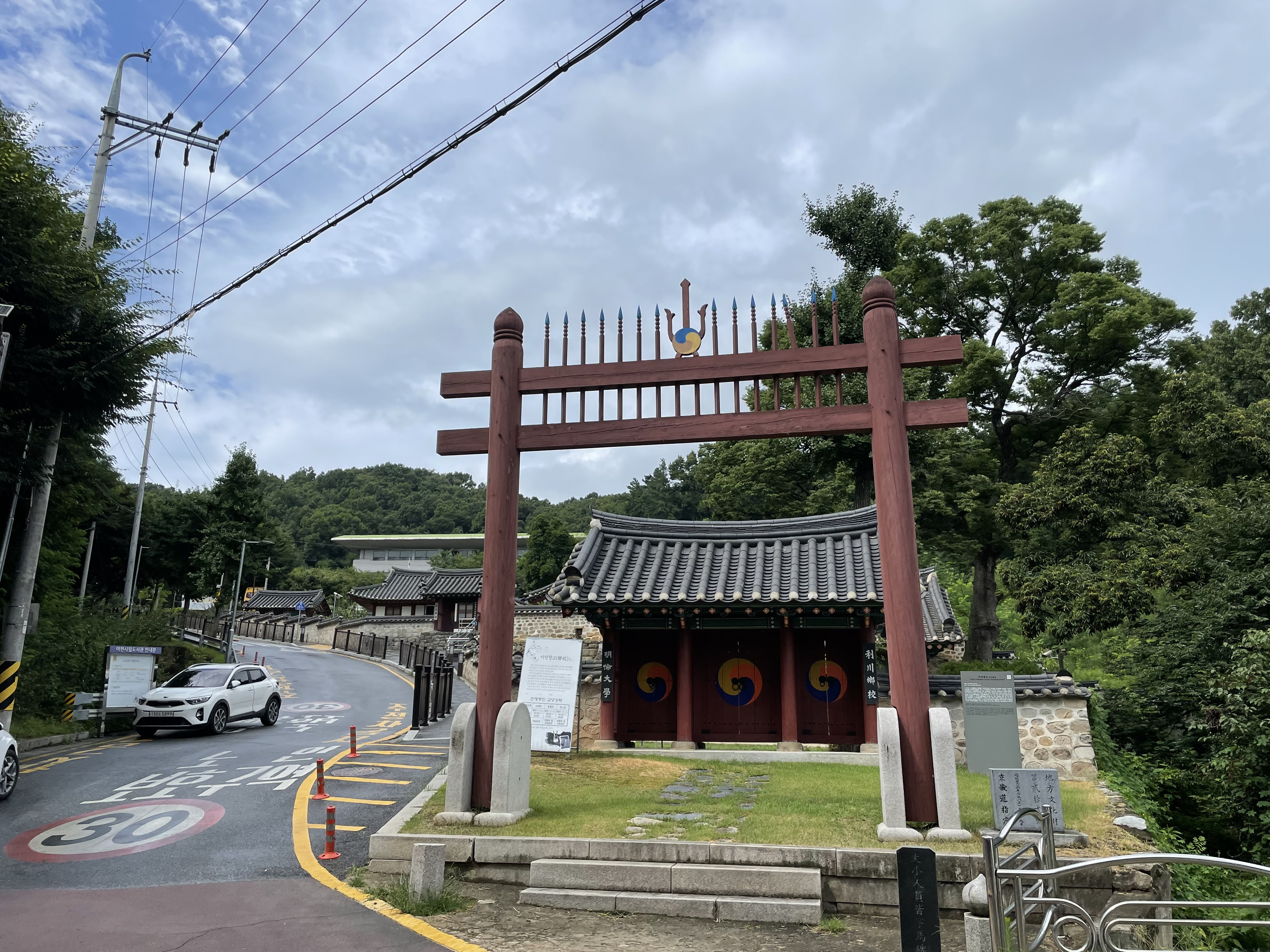
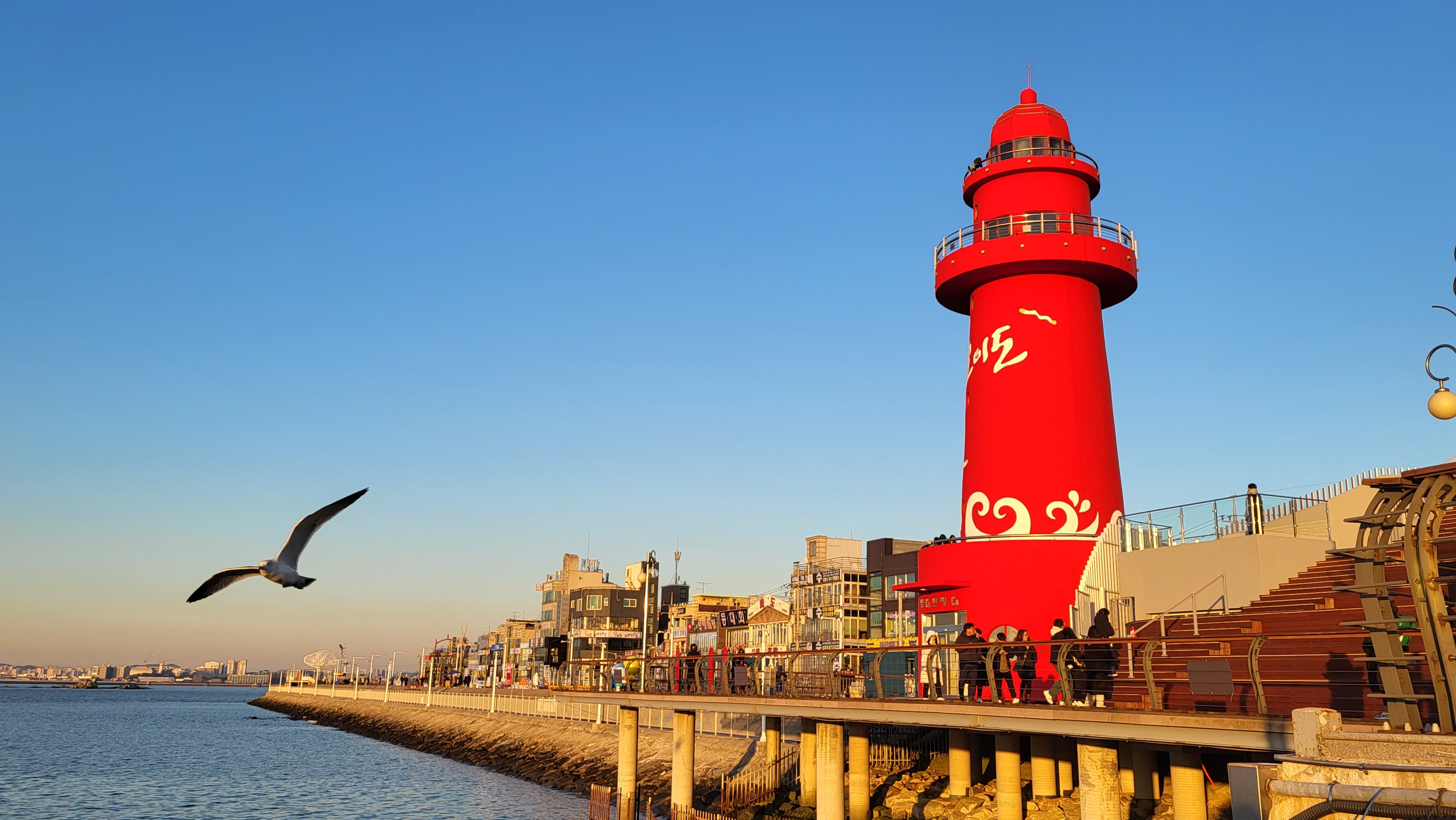
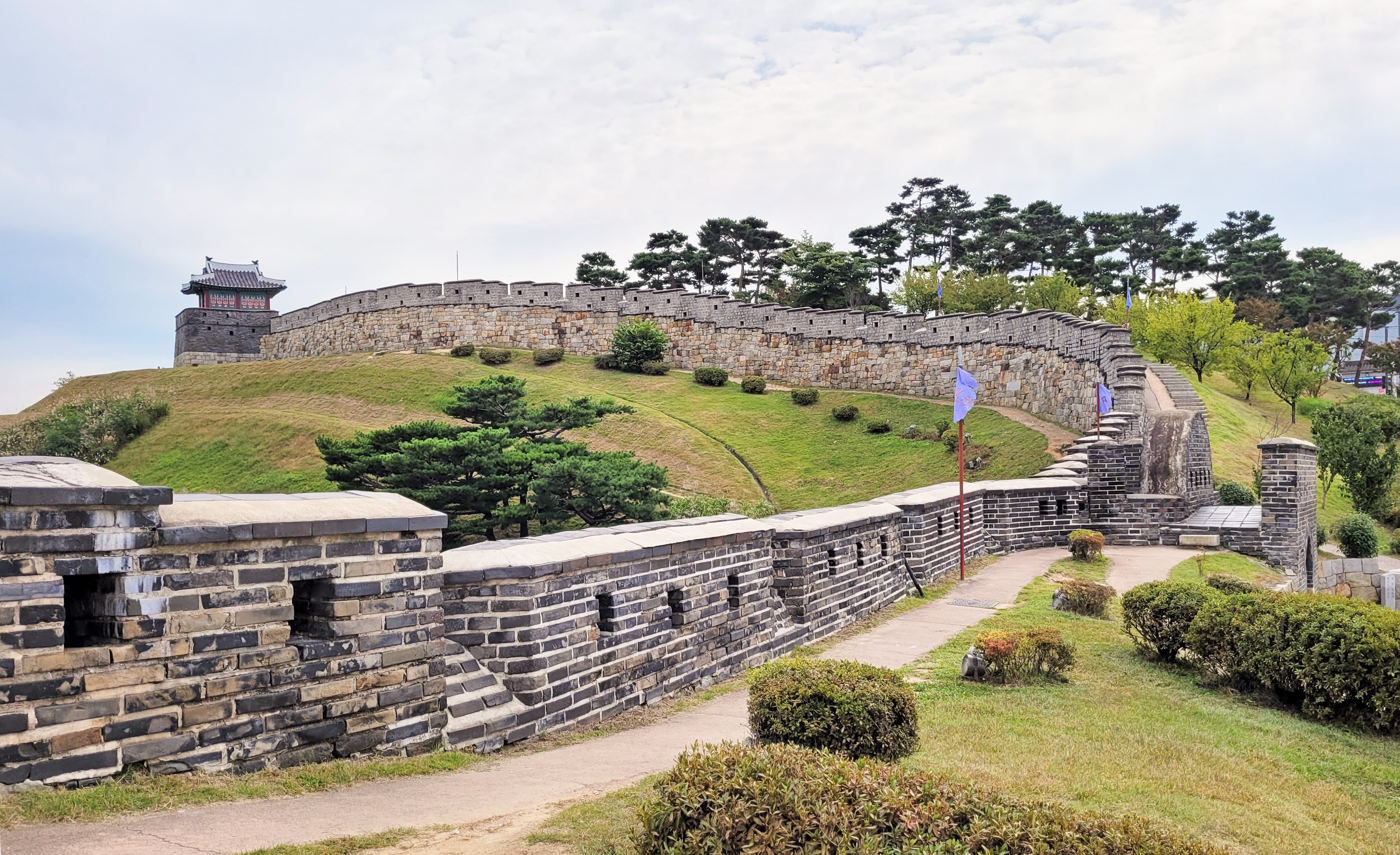
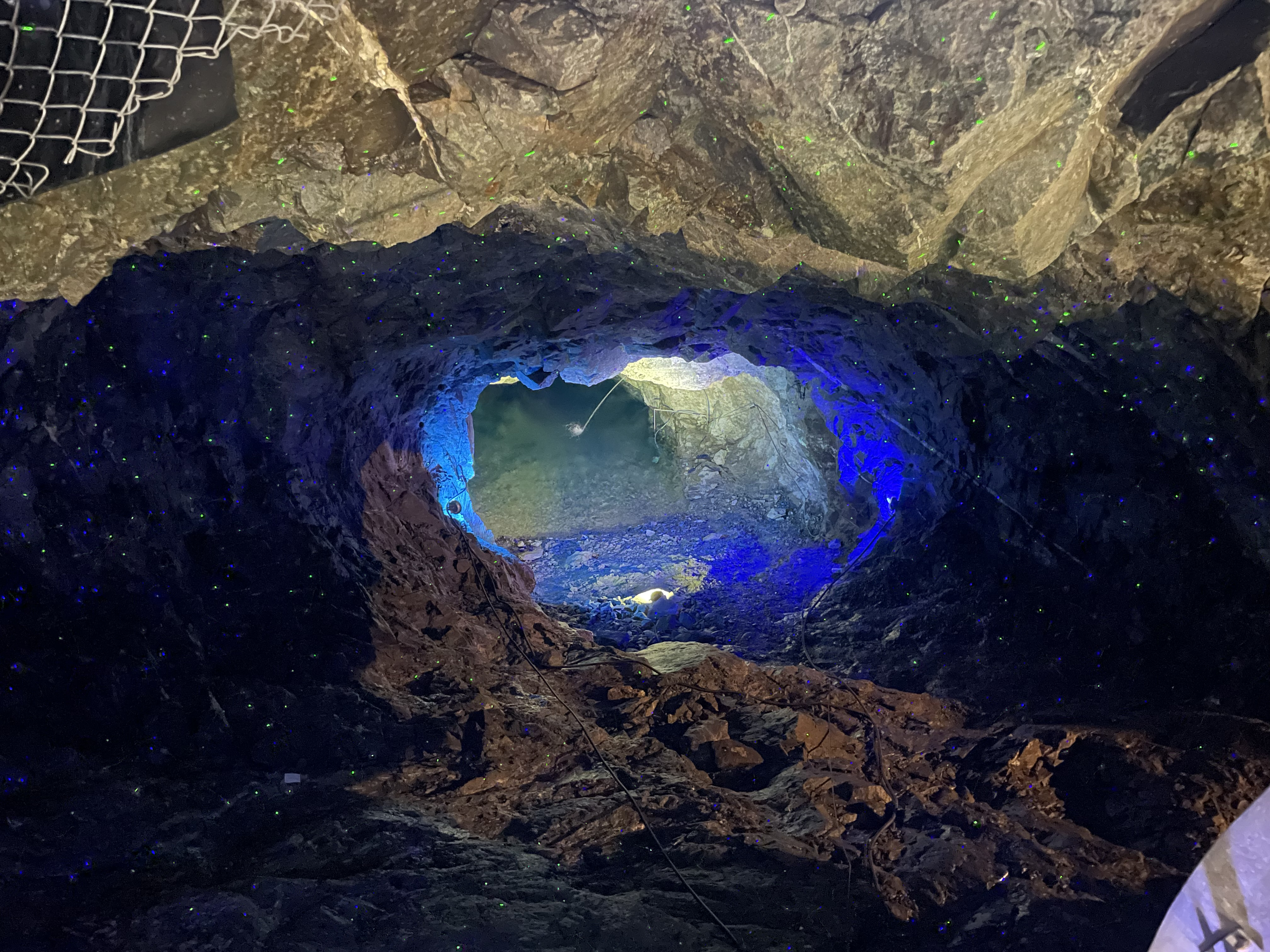
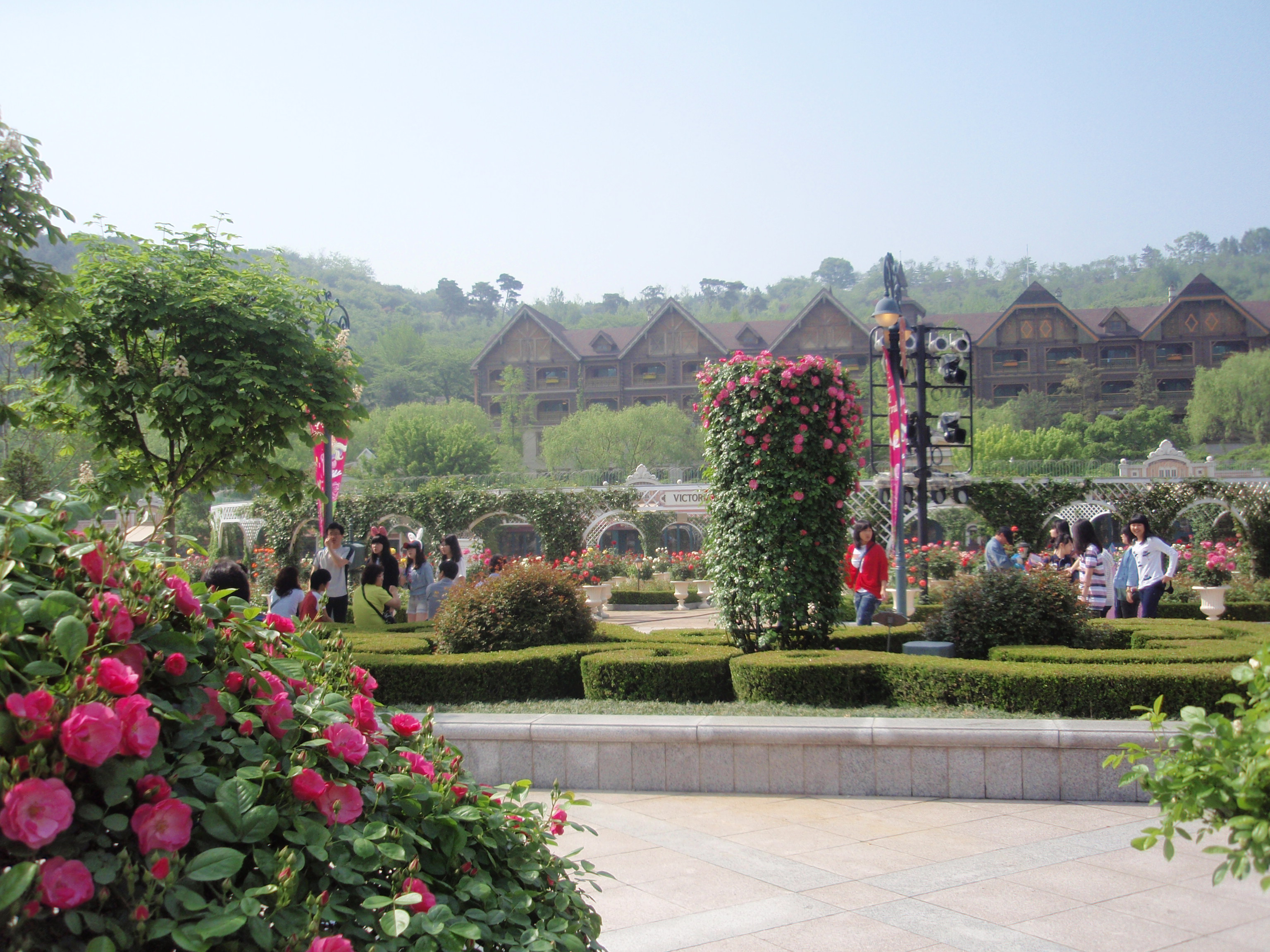
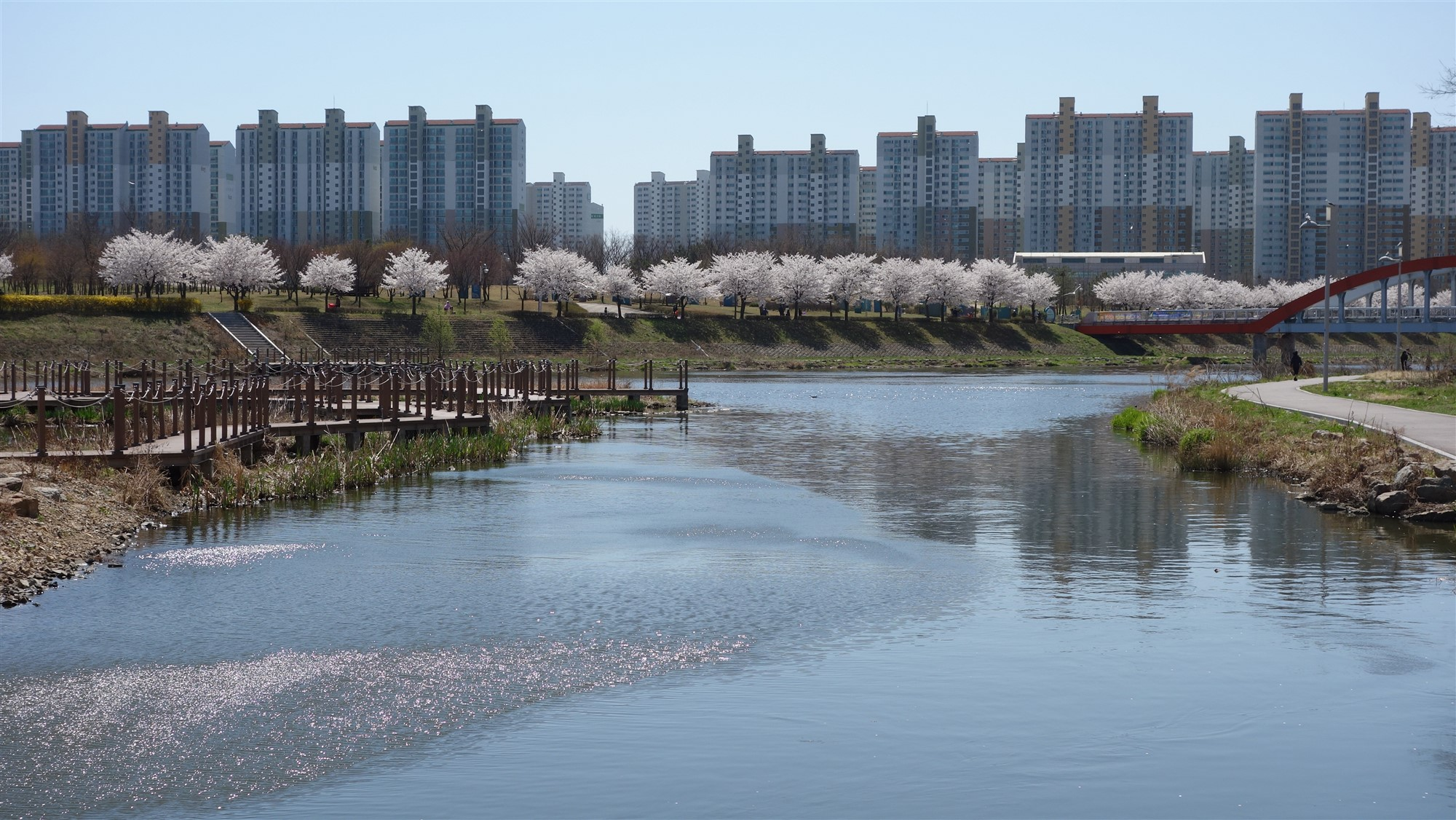
- From the left: Seongnam, Icheon, Siheung, Suwon, Gwangmyeong, Yongin, Ansan

- Flag Logo

- Coordinates: 37°30′N 127°15′E
- Country: South Korea
- Region: Seoul Metropolitan Area
- Capital: Suwon
- Subdivisions: 28 cities; 3 counties

Government
  - Governor: Choo Mi-ae (Democratic)
  - Legislature: Gyeonggi Assembly

Area
  - Total: 10,199 km^{2} (3,938 sq mi)
  - Rank: 5th

Population (2020 census)
  - Total: 13,511,676
  - Rank: 1st
  - Density: 1,327/km^{2} (3,440/sq mi)

GDP (Nominal, 2023)
  - Total: KRW 594 trillion (US$475 billion)
  - Per capita: US$39,969
- ISO 3166 code: KR-41
- Dialect: Gyeonggi
- Blog: Official blog
- Website: Official website (English)

Korean name
- Hangul: 경기도
- Hanja: 京畿道
- RR: Gyeonggi-do
- MR: Kyŏnggi-do

Gyeonggi Province (Korean: 경기도, pronounced [kjʌŋ.ɡi.do]) is the most populous province in South Korea.

Seoul, the nation's largest city and capital, is in the heart of the area but has been separately administered as a provincial-level special city since 1946. Incheon, the nation's third-largest city, is on the coast of the province and has been similarly administered as a provincial-level metropolitan city since 1981. The three jurisdictions are collectively referred to as Sudogwon and cover 11,730 km^{2} (4,530 sq mi), with a combined population of over 26 million – amounting to over half (50.25%) of the entire population of South Korea, and a third of the population of the Korean peninsula at the 2020 census.

== Etymology ==
Its name, Gyeonggi, means "京 (the capital) and 畿 (the surrounding area)". Thus, Gyeonggi Province can be translated as "Seoul and the surrounding areas of Seoul".

== History ==
Gyeonggi Province has been a politically important area since 18 BCE, when Korea was divided into three nations during the Three Kingdoms period. Ever since King Onjo, the founder of Baekje (one of the three kingdoms), founded the government in Wiryeseong of Hanam, the Han River Valley was absorbed into Goguryeo in the mid-fifth century, and became Silla's territory in the year 553 (the 14th year of King Jinheung). (Note: In traditional Korean timekeeping, years are tracked by reign of monarchs. Today, this is practiced in addition to Common Era (CE).) Afterward, the current location of Gyeonggi Province, one of the nine states of Later Silla, was called Hansanju.

The Gyeonggi region started to rise as the central region of Goryeo as King Taejo of Goryeo (the kingdom following Silla) set up the capital in Gaesong. Since 1018 (the 9th year of Goryeo's King Hyeonjong), this area has been officially called "Gyeonggi".

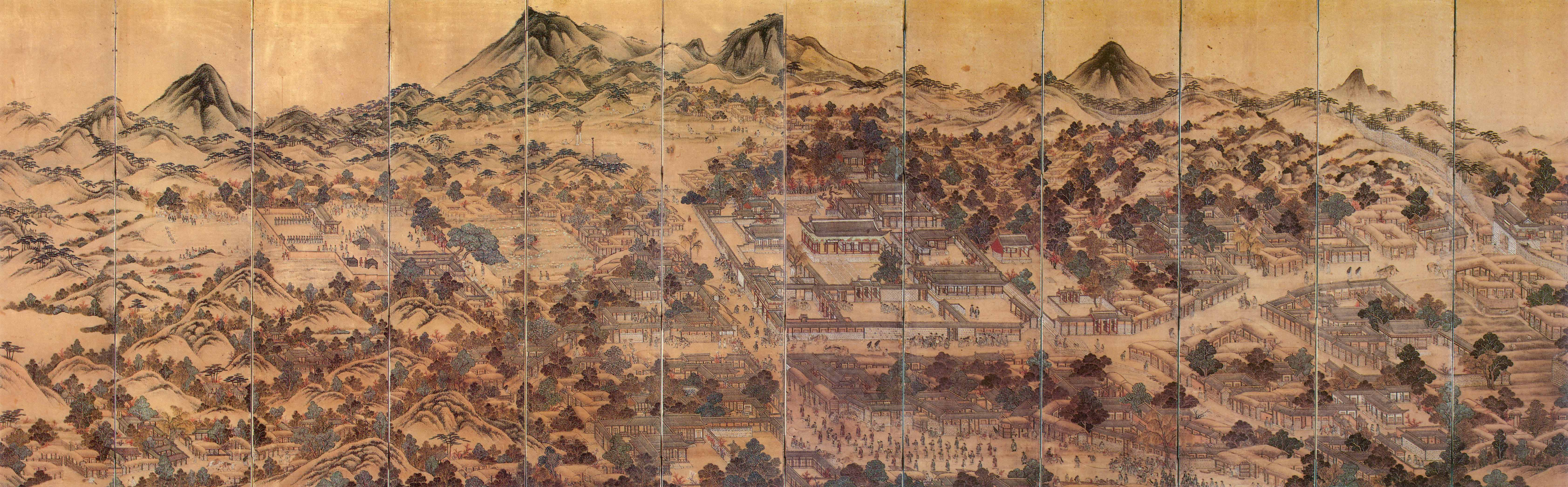
Headquarters of the provincial governor, Joseon dynasty

During the Joseon, which was founded after the Goryeo, King Taejo of Joseon set the capital in Hanyang, while restructuring Gyeonggi's area to include Gwangju, Suwon, Yeoju, and Anseong, along with the southeast region. Since the period of King Taejong and Sejong the Great, the Gyeonggi region has been very similar to the current administrative area of Gyeonggi Province.

In 1895 the 23-Bu system, which reorganized administrative areas, was effected. The Gyeonggi region was divided into Hanseong (modern Seoul), Incheon, Chungju, Gongju, and Kaesong.

During the Japanese colonial period, Hanseong-bu was incorporated into Gyeonggi Province. On October 1, 1910, it was renamed Keijo and a provincial government was placed in Keijo according to the reorganization of administrative districts.

After liberation and the foundation of two separate Korean states, Gyeonggi Province and its capital, Seoul, were separated with partial regions of Gyeonggi Province being incorporated into Seoul thereafter in 1946. Additionally, Kaesong became North Korean territory, the only city to change control after the countries were divided at the 38th parallel, which is now part of North Korea's North Hwanghae Province.

In 1967 the seat of the Gyeonggi provincial government was transferred from Seoul to Suwon. After Incheon separated from Gyeonggi Province in 1981, Gyeonggi regions such as Ongjin County and Ganghwa County were incorporated into Incheon in 1995.

== Geography ==
Gyeonggi Province is in the western central region of the Korean Peninsula, which is vertically situated in Northeast Asia and is between east longitude of 126 and 127, and north latitude of 36 and 38. Its dimension is 10% of Korea's territory, 10,171 square kilometres (3,927 mi^{2}). It is in contact with 86 kilometres (53 mi) of cease-fire line to the north, 413 kilometres (257 mi) of coastline to the west, Gangwon Province to the east, North Chungcheong Province and South Chungcheong Province to the south, and has Seoul, the capital of the Republic of Korea, in its center. Its provincial government is in Suwon, but some of its government buildings are in Uijeongbu for the administrative conveniences of the northern region.

=== Climate ===
The climate of Gyeonggi Province is the continental climate, which has a severe differentiation of temperature between summer and winter, and has distinctions of four seasons. Spring is warm, summer is hot and humid, autumn is cool, and winter is cold and snowy. The annual average temperature is between 11–13 °C (52–55 °F), where the temperature in the mountainous areas to the northeast is lower and the coastal areas to the southwest is higher. For January's average temperature, the Gyeonggi Bay is −4 °C (25 °F), the Namhangang (River) Basin is −4 to −6 °C (25 to 21 °F), and the Bukhangang (River) and Imjingang Basins are −6 to −8 °C (21 to 18 °F). It becomes colder and higher in temperature differentiation from coastal to inland areas. Summer has a lower local differentiation compared to winter. The inland areas are hotter than the Gyeonggi Bay area, the hottest area is Pyeongtaek, making the average temperature of August 26.5 °C (79.7 °F).

The annual average precipitation is around 1,100 millimetres (43 in), with a lot of rainfall. It is rainy in summer and dry during winter. The northeastern inland areas of Bukhangang and the upper stream of Imjingang has a precipitation of 1,300–1,400 millimetres (51–55 in), whereas the coastal area has only 900 millimetres (35 in) of precipitation.

=== Nature and national parks ===
The topography of Gyeonggi Province is divided into southern and northern areas by the Han River, which flows from east to west. The area north to the Han River is mainly mountainous, while the southern area is mainly plain.

The configuration of Gyeonggi Province is represented by Dong-go-seo-jeo (high in the east and low in the west), where the Gwangju Mountain Range and the Charyeong Mountain Range spreads from the east and drops in elevation in the west. The fields of Gimpo, Gyeonggi, and Pyeongtaek extend to the west.

Gyeonggi Province natural environment includes its rivers, lakes, mountains, and seas. Its representative rivers are the Hangang, Imjingang, and Anseongcheon Fg(Stream), which flow into the Yellow Sea, with Gyeonggi Plain, Yeonbaek Plain and Anseong Plain forming a fertile field area around the rivers. The Gwangju Mountain Range and the Charyeong Mountain Range stretch toward China in Gyeonggi Province. Most of the mountains that rise above 1,000 metres (3,300 ft), such as Myeongjisan (1,267 metres (4,157 ft)), Gukmangbong (1,168 metres (3,832 ft)) and Yongmunsan (1,157 metres (3,796 ft)) in the Gwangju Mountain Range. It iriidc Ktihas a developed granite area which, due to the granite's exfoliation effect, makes it full of strangely shaped cliffs and deep valleys. The Charyeong Mountain Range forms the boundary between Gyeonggi Province and North Chungcheong Province, but is a relatively low-altitude hilly area.

In Gyeonggi Province, there is Bukhansan National Park in Uijeongbu. For provincial parks, there are the Chukryeongsan Natural Recreation Area, Namhan-sanseong Provincial Park, Gapyeong Yeoninsan Provincial Park, and Mulhyanggi Arboretum. Besides the listed, the scenery of well-known mountains including Soyosan of Dongducheon City, Yongmunsan of Yangpyeong County, and Gwanaksan of Anyang and Gwacheon, along with Hangang and Imjingang are tourist sites of Gyeonggi Province.

- Moraksan, a 385-meter rock mountain.

== Population ==
Historical population
Year	Pop.	±%
1930	2,004,012	—
1940	2,668,119	+33.1%
1949	2,733,944	+2.5%
1960	2,748,765	+0.5%
1970	2,662,904	−3.1%
1980	3,849,956	+44.6%
1990	6,155,632	+59.9%
2000	8,984,134	+45.9%
2010	11,379,459	+26.7%
2020	13,511,676	+18.7%
Population decrease between 1960–1970 is due to Incheon being excluded from population figures from there. Source:

Gyeonggi Province has shown a rapid increase in population due to the modernization and urbanization of the Republic of Korea. Its population has increased from 2,748,765 in 1960 to 3,703,761 in 1980; 6,050,943 in 1990; 8,984,134 in 2000; 11,379,459 in 2010; and 13,511,676 in 2020.

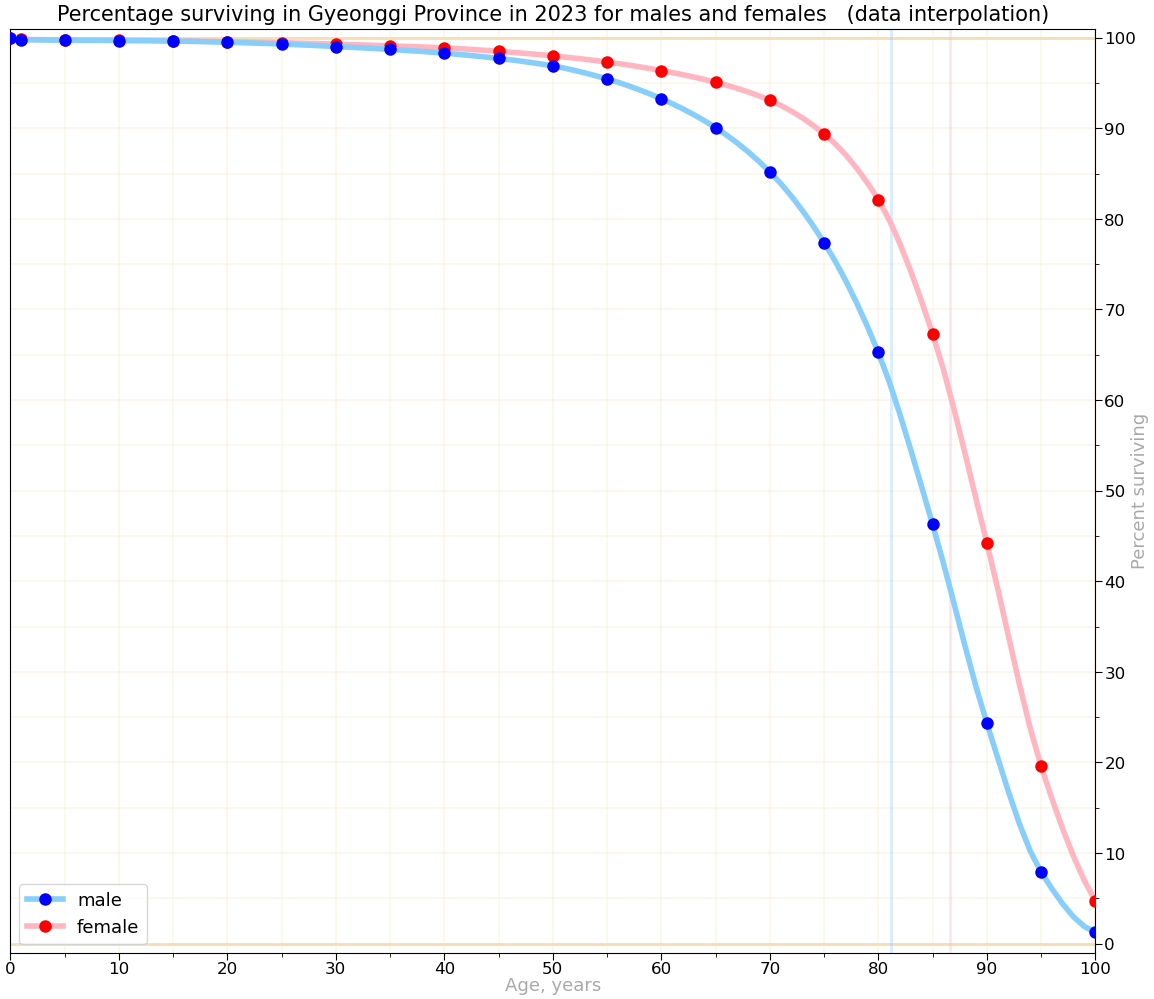
Percentage surviving to certatin ages in Gyeonggi Province in 2023. Life expectancy for the province in 2023 was 83.9 years.

In 2010 there were 4,527,282 households, with an average of 3 people per family. There were 6,112,339 males and 5,959,545 females. The population density was 1,119 people/km^{2}, almost double the national average of 486 people/km^{2}.

The province's most heavily populated area as of 2024 is Suwon (1,195,000) followed by Yongin (1,085,000), Goyang (1,071,000), Hwasung (962,000), Seongnam (915,000) and Bucheon (772,000). The lowest populated area in 2010 was Yeoncheon County (41,000), followed by Gapyeong County (62,000) and Yangpyeong County (72,595).

== Economy ==
As the backbone of Seoul in the means of manufacturing complex, Gyeonggi Province is evenly developed in heavy industry (electronics, machine, heavy and chemical industry, steel), light industry (textile), and farm, livestock and fisheries industry. Due to the influence of recent high wages, the weight of manufacturing industries has decreased in Korea's economy. Gyeonggi Province is making efforts in many ways to improve and modernize the conventional industry structure, resulting in quick growth of innovative small and medium-sized enterprises such as U-JIN Tech Corp. Gyeonggi Province is unsparingly investing in the promotion of service industries related to soft competitive power such as state-of-the-art IT industry, designing, conventions and tourism, along with its great leap as a commercial hub in Northeast Asia using the Pyeongtaek Harbor.

Besides this, it is known for its special local products such as Icheon rice and Gwangju ceramics. Leading companies representing Korea, including Samsung Electronics' headquarters, SK Hynix's headquarters, NAVER's headquarters, Samsung SDI's headquarters, and Paju LG Corporation's LCD complex, are gathered in southern Gyeonggi Province, including Suwon City.

== Administrative area ==
Gyeonggi Province consists of 28 cities (special: 7, normal: 21) and three counties. This is because many counties were elevated to city status owing to the influence of Seoul's new town development plan. Special cities are especially concentrated in the southern area of Gyeonggi Province.

Listed below is each entity's name in English, Hangul and Hanja.

Map	#	Name	Hangul	Hanja	Population (2015.5)	Subdivisions
— Special City —
	1	Suwon	수원시	水原市	1,177,376	4 ilban-gu — 41 haengjeong-dong
	2	Seongnam	성남시	城南市	974,580	3 ilban-gu — 39 haengjeong-dong
	3	Goyang	고양시	高陽市	1,041,706	3 ilban-gu — 46 haengjeong-dong
	4	Yongin	용인시	龍仁市	968,346	3 ilban-gu — 1 eup, 6 myeon, 23 haengjeong-dong
	5	Bucheon	부천시	富川市	852,758	36 haengjeong-dong
	6	Ansan	안산시	安山市	704,765	2 ilban-gu — 24 haengjeong-dong
	7	Anyang	안양시	安養市	599,464	2 ilban-gu — 31 haengjeong-dong
	8	Namyangju	남양주시	南楊州市	640,579	5 eup, 4 myeon, 7 haengjeong-dong
	9	Hwaseong	화성시	華城市	565,269	4 eup, 10 myeon, 10 haengjeong-dong
— City —
	10	Uijeongbu	의정부시	議政府市	431,149	15 haengjeong-dong
	11	Siheung	시흥시	始興市	393,356	17 haengjeong-dong
	12	Pyeongtaek	평택시	平澤市	453,437	3 eup, 6 myeon, 13 haengjeong-dong
	13	Gwangmyeong	광명시	光明市	346,888	18 haengjeong-dong
	14	Paju	파주시	坡州市	416,439	4 eup, 9 myeon, 7 haengjeong-dong
	15	Gunpo	군포시	軍浦市	288,494	11 haengjeong-dong
	16	Gwangju	광주시	廣州市	304,503	3 eup, 4 myeon, 3 haengjeong-dong
	17	Gimpo	김포시	金浦市	344,585	3 eup, 3 myeon, 6 haengjeong-dong
	18	Icheon	이천시	利川市	204,988	2 eup, 8 myeon, 4 haengjeong-dong
	19	Yangju	양주시	楊州市	203,519	1 eup, 4 myeon, 6 haengjeong-dong
	20	Guri	구리시	九里市	186,611	8 haengjeong-dong
	21	Osan	오산시	烏山市	207,596	6 haengjeong-dong
	22	Anseong	안성시	安城市	181,478	1 eup, 11 myeon, 3 haengjeong-dong
	23	Uiwang	의왕시	義王市	157,916	6 haengjeong-dong
	24	Pocheon	포천시	抱川市	155,629	1 eup, 11 myeon, 2 haengjeong-dong
	25	Hanam	하남시	河南市	155,752	12 haengjeong-dong
	26	Dongducheon	동두천시	東豆川市	97,407	8 haengjeong-dong
	27	Gwacheon	과천시	果川市	69,914	6 haengjeong-dong
	28	Yeoju	여주시	驪州市	110,560	1 eup, 8 myeon, 3 haengjeong-dong
— County —
	29	Yangpyeong	양평군	楊平郡	106,445	1 eup, 11 myeon
	30	Gapyeong	가평군	加平郡	61,403	1 eup, 5 myeon
	31	Yeoncheon	연천군	漣川郡	45,314	2 eup, 8 myeon

=== Claimed ===
- Gaeseong, Gaepung County and Jangdan County

== Transportation ==
Gyeonggi Province's proximity to Seoul, South Korea's capital, and Incheon, its second-busiest port, has contributed to its extremely well-developed transportation infrastructure. It is close to both Incheon International Airport, South Korea's main international gateway and busiest airport, and Gimpo International Airport, its second-busiest airport. Use of water transportation from the harbor at Pyeongtaek is also high.

=== Road ===
The road pavement rate throughout the province averages 86.5 percent. The area has access to many of South Korea's expressways, including

- No. 1 Gyeongbu Expressway, Seoul–Busan
- No. 15 Seohaean Expressway, Seoul–Mokpo
- No. 35 Jungbu Expressway, Seoul–Tongyeong
- No. 37 Second Jungbu Expressway, Seoul–Yongin
- No. 45 Jungbu Naeryuk Expressway, Yangpyeong–Changwon
- No. 50 Yeongdong Expressway, Incheon–Gangneung
- No. 60 Seoul–Yangyang Expressway, Seoul–Chuncheon
- No. 100 Seoul Ring Expressway
- No. 110 Second Gyeongin Expressway, Incheon–Anyang
- No. 120 Gyeongin Expressway, Seoul–Incheon
- No. 130 Incheon International Airport Expressway, Incheon International Airport–Seoul
- No. 153 Siheung-Pyeongtaek Expressway

=== Rail ===
Gyeonggi Province is served by Korail commuter, standard and high-speed (KTX) services. It is home to Korea's first railroad, the Gyeongin Line, and includes portions of the GTX-A Line, Gyeongbu Line, Gyeongui Line, Jungang Line, and Honam Line. Gyeonggi has stations on the Suin, Bundang, Gyeongchun, and Shinbundang commuter rail services and the Gyeongbu and Honam High Speed Railways.

The area has numerous connections to the Seoul Metropolitan Subway system. Line 1 (formerly Korea National Railroad of Seoul) extends to Cheonan past Gyeonggi Province to the southwest, and to Dongducheon to the north. Line 3 connects to Goyang to the north, while Line 4 is connected to Gwacheon and Ansan to the southwest. Line 7 is connected to Uijeongbu to the north and Gwangmyeong to the south, Line 8 is connected to Seongnam to the south, while the GTX-A line connects Paju and Goyang to Yeonsinnae Station in Eunpyeong-gu and Seoul Station in Jung-gu.

Uijeongbu has its own light rail system, the U Line, which connects to Line 1.

A short section of the AREX line between Gimpo and Incheon airports passes through Gyeonggi, but there are no stops within the province.

== Education ==
Gyeonggi Province is encouraging the opening of local campuses of reputable universities as well as establishing special purpose high schools. It has also founded and operates at Paju the largest domestic "English village" for education in the English language, as well as villages in Ansan and Yangpyeong.

=== Universities of Gyeonggi Province ===
- National
- Anseong City
  - Hankyong National University
  - Dong-A Institute of Media and Arts
- Uiwang City
  - Korea National University of Transportation (Uiwang Campus)
- Private
- Ansan City
  - Ansan University
  - Hanyang University (ERICA Campus)
  - Seoul Institute of the Arts
  - Shin Ansan University
- Anseong City
  - Chung-Ang University (Anseong Campus)
- Anyang City
  - Anyang University
  - Sungkyul University
- Bucheon City
  - Seoul Theological University
- Goyang City
  - Korea Aerospace University
- Gunpo City
  - Hansei University
- Gwangju City
  - Seoul Jangsin University and Theological Seminary
- Hwaseong City
  - Hyupsung University
  - Shingyeong University
- Osan City
  - Hanshin University
- Pochon City
  - College of Medicine Pochon CHA University
  - Daejin University
- Pyeongtaek City
  - Pyongtaek University
- Seongnam City
  - Gachon University
- Siheung City
  - Korea Polytechnic University
- Suwon City
  - Ajou University
  - Kyung Hee University
  - Seoul National University (Gwanggyo Graduate School Campus)
  - Sungkyungwan university (Natural Science Campus)
  - Suwon Catholic University
  - Suwon Science College
- Uijeongbu City
  - Shin han University
- Yangpyeong County
  - Asian Center for Theological Studies and Mission
- Yongin City
  - Calvin University
  - Dankook University
  - Hankuk University of Foreign Studies (Global Campus)
  - Kangnam University
  - Kyung Hee University (International Campus)
  - Luther University
  - Myongji University (Science Departments Campus)
  - Yongin University

== Culture ==
=== Historical landmarks ===
Gyeonggi Province has long been a capital area, leaving many historic relics and ruins. For royal tombs (called reung), there are Donggureung of Guri, and Gwangreung, Hongreung and Yureung of Namyangju. For castles (called seong), there are Suwon Hwaseong, which is designated as the World Cultural Heritage, Namwonsanseong, Haengjusanseong, Ganghwasanseong, and Doksan Fortress. For Buddhist temples, there are many aged temples within Gyeonggi Province where one can experience 'temple stay'. You can view folk culture in the Korean Folk Village in Yongin, and the scene of Korea's division at Panmunjom in Paju.

=== Performing arts ===
Gyeonggi Province is investing a lot of money at a provincial level so that people do not have to go to Seoul to enjoy a high-class cultural life. There are performances at Gyeonggi Arts Center in Suwon as well as at Gyeonggi Korean Traditional Music Center in Yongin. Gyeonggi Provincial Museum in Yongin, Nam June Paik Art Center in Yongin, Gyeonggi Museum of Art in Ansan, and the Ceramics Museum in Gwangju are some of the facilities that are currently run by the province. There are also sightseeing opportunities at Jangheung Art Park, Publication Art Complex at Heyri, Paju, and the Icheon Ceramics Exposition.

=== Heyri Art Valley ===
Heyri Art Valley is Korea's largest art town. Various Korean artists constructed the cultural town of Heyri and it features several art galleries and museums; there are about 40 museums, exhibitions, concert halls and bookstores.

=== Religion ===
Religion in Gyeonggi Province (2015)
1. Not religious or Other (57.3%)
2. Protestantism (23.0%)
3. Buddhism (10.7%)
4. Catholicism (9.00%)

According to the census of 2015, of the people of Gyeonggi Province 32.0% follow Christianity (23.0% Protestantism and 9.0% Catholicism) and 10.7% follow Buddhism. 57.3% of the population is mostly not religious or follow indigenous religions.

=== Park ===
The Province has Ilsan Lake Park, one of the largest lake parks in the country. In addition, there is Gwanggyo Lake Park, which was redeveloped in 2013.

== Sports ==
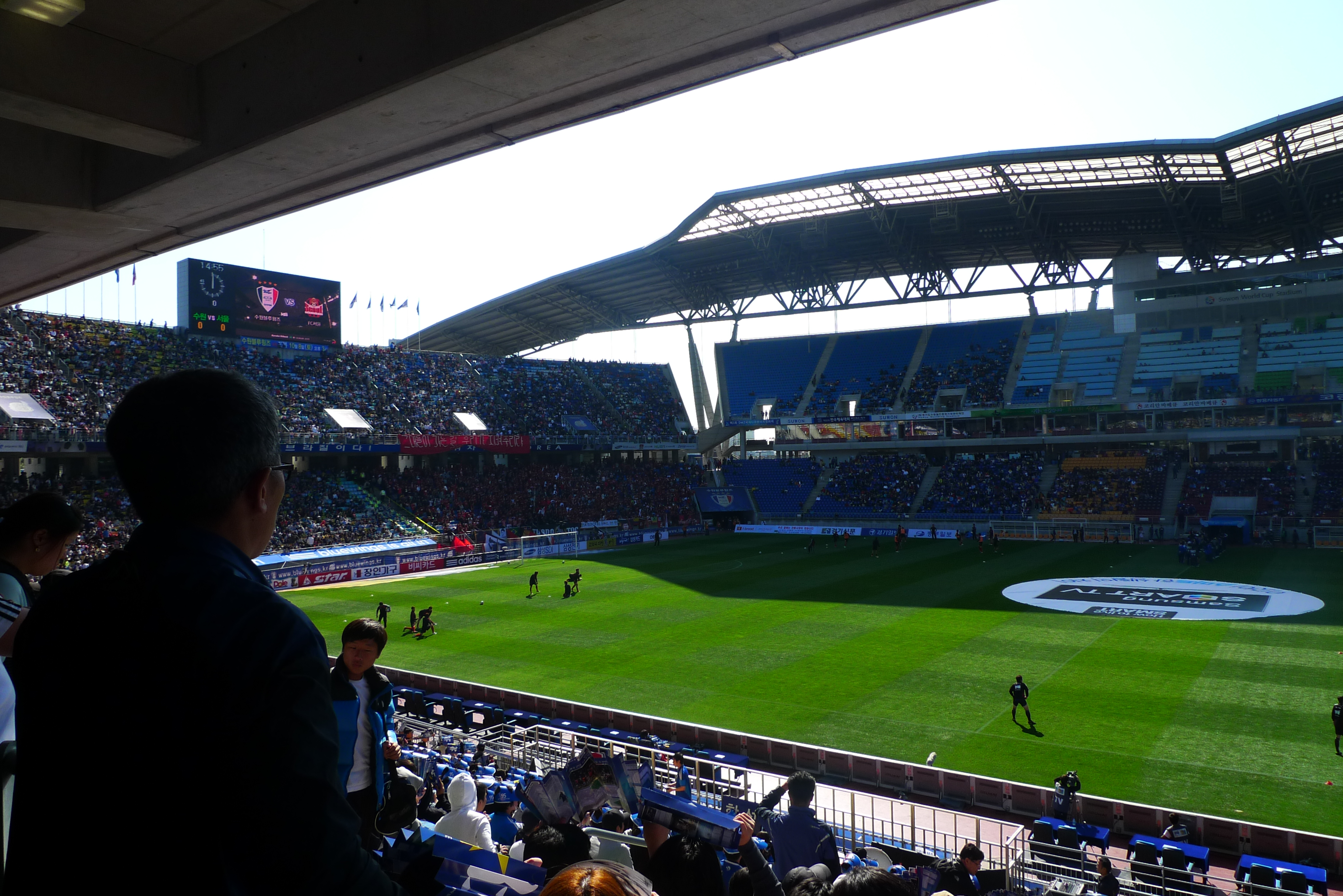
Suwon World Cup Stadium

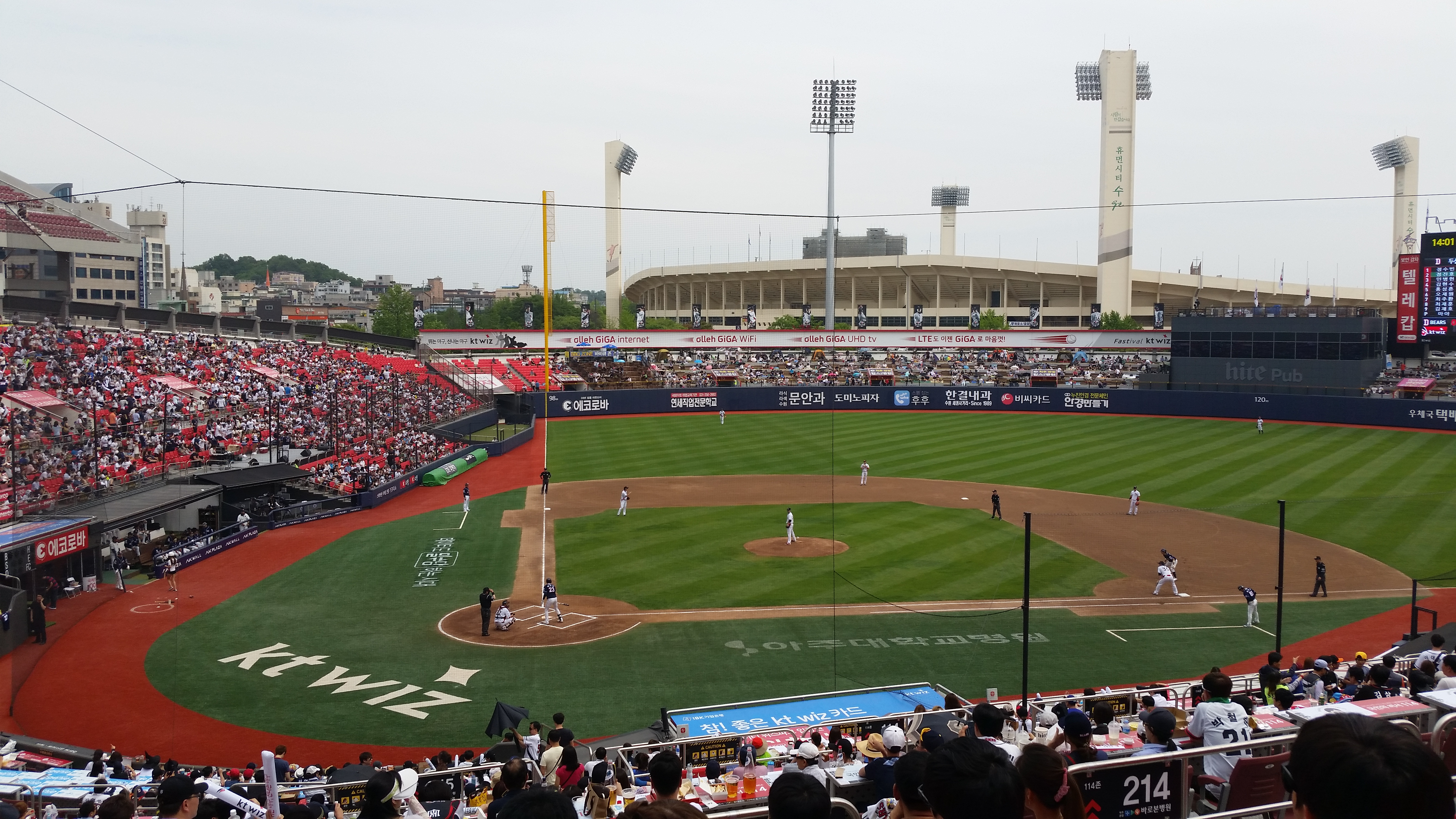
Suwon Baseball Stadium

The 2002 Korea-Japan World Cup matches were held in Suwon World Cup Stadium. As for the professional soccer teams with Gyeonggi Province as their home ground, there are the Suwon Samsung Bluewings and Seongnam FC.

Korea's foremost thoroughbred horse racing track Seoul Race Park is in Gwacheon.

=== Domestic sports clubs ===
==== Association football ====
- K League 1 (1)
  - Suwon FC
- K League 2 (6)
  - Suwon Samsung Bluewings
  - Seongnam FC
  - FC Anyang
  - Ansan Greeners
  - Bucheon FC 1995
  - Gimpo FC
- K3 League (5)
  - Hwaseong FC
  - Paju Citizen
  - Pyeongtaek Citizen
  - Yangju Citizen
  - Siheung Citizen
- K4 League (5)
  - Goyang Citizen
  - Pocheon Citizen
  - Yangpyeong FC
  - Yeoju FC
- WK-League (2)
  - Suwon FMC
  - Goyang Daekyo Noonnoppi Kangaroos

==== Baseball ====
- Korea Baseball Organization (1)
  - KT Wiz

==== Basketball ====
- KBL (2)
  - Anyang KGC
  - Goyang Orion Orions
- WKBL (4)
  - Yongin Samsung Life Blueminx
  - Ansan Shinhan Bank S-Birds
  - Guri KDB Life Winnus
  - Bucheon KEB-Hana

==== Volleyball ====
- V-League Men (2)
  - Suwon KEPCO Vixtorm
  - Sangmu Shinhyup
- V-League Women (3)
  - Suwon Hyundai Engineering & Construction Hillstate
  - Seongnam Korea Expressway Hi-pass Zenith
  - Hwaseong IBK Altos

==== Ice hockey ====
- Asia League Ice Hockey (1)
  - HL Anyang

=== Former sports clubs ===
==== Football ====
- Anyang LG Cheetahs (1996–2003, Anyang → Seoul)
- Bucheon SK (1996–2005, Bucheon → Jeju)
- Bucheon FMC Best (2010, Dissolved)
- Ansan H FC
- Goyang KB Kookmin Bank
- Namyangju United

==== Basketball ====
- Suwon Samsung Thunders (1997–2001, Suwon → Seoul)
- Bucheon Shinsegae Coolcat (2006–2012, Dissolved)

== Tourism ==
=== Entertainment ===
- Everland theme park in Yongin-si
- Korean Folk Village in Yongin-si
- Munhwa Broadcasting Corporation (MBC) Dramia at Cheoin-gu in Yongin-si; is the filming location of historical dramas such as Moon Embracing the Sun, Jumong, Queen Seondeok and Dong Yi. Viewing tours are available, which includes traditional folk games, historical court dress and archery.
- Hallyuworld theme park, which is based on the 'Korean Fever', is under construction in Goyang
- Seoul Grand Park in Gwacheon, which has the Korea's National Museum of Contemporary Art and a zoo * ski and golf resorts
- Icheon Hot Spring
- LetsRunPark in Gwacheon

=== Gourmet ===
Gyeonggi Province has long been famous for its Icheon rice, Yangpyeong Korean beef, Suwon cow ribs and Korean court cuisine, and marine delicacies made of fresh marine products from the west coast.

=== Festival ===
Area	Festival Name	Period	Main Contents	Sponsor/Supervision
Suwon	Hwaseong Cultural Festival	October	Great King Jeong Jo parade, Hwaryeongjeon Heondarae, re-presentation of the 60th birthday banquet of Hyekyeongung Hong, re-presentation of Kwageo (state examination during the Joseon dynasty) National housewife scenery festival, traditional flag game, culture and art festival, international food festival, drawing of Mars	Suwon City, Hwaseong Cultural Festival Committee
Suwon	KBS Drama Festival	August ~ October	KBS Magic, Studio Tour, digital image machinery, public broadcasting, reconstructions of historical dramas, national amateur image contest	Suwon City, KBS
Seongnam	Seongnam Global Folk Art Festival	May	Global folk dancing, music and clothing festival with 400 performers from 12 countries participating	Seongnam/Gyeongpyeong International Co., Ltd.
Seongnam	Seongnam Cultural Art Festival	May~June, September~October	International / dance / music / play / movie festivals, art / picture exhibitions, citizen composition contest, citizen singing contest	Seongnam City, Seongnam Art Assembly and Members
Seongnam	Moran 5-Day Folk Festival	April	Traditional folk art performances, reminiscent folk song stage, art performance of modern taste	Moran 5-Day Folk Festival Committee
Seongnam	Seongnam Art Village Lotus Festival	July	Lotus and nature workbook exhibition, lotus food and local food corner	Lotus Festival Committee
Anyang	Anyang Cultural Art Festival	Mid-May	Culture and art events such as art, music, dancing and plays	Anyang Cultural Center and Art Assembly Anyang Branch
Anyang	Anyang Citizen Festival	October	Local festival full of things to see / play / buy / eat	Anyang City/Anyang Citizen Festival Committee
Goyang	Goyang Haengju Cultural Festival	April	Seungjeon Street Parade, folk contest, Haengju Daecheop memorial services and rites	Goyang City/Goyang Cultural Center
Bucheon	Boksagol Art Festival	May	Student and citizen composition contest, street festival, image and picture subscription, art festival, citizen singing contest, dance contest, family musicals for children, play contest, music contest, citizen movie contest, citizen photography contest	Korea Art Assembly Bucheon Branch
Ansan	Danwon Art Festival (Kim Hong-do Festival)	September	Art Contest: art subscription contest, art appreciation classroom, street art contest Ansan Kim Hong-do Festival: Danwon PR Hall, antique necessity products exhibition, yard play, art experience, traditional eateries	Ansan City/Danwon Art Festival Committee
Ansan	Byeolmangseong Art Festival	September	Byeolmangseong Festival, Byeolchomu performance, fireworks, teenager play festival, national music festival, other art events	Ansan City/Ansan Art Assembly
Ansan	Seongho Cultural Festival	May	Seongho admiration services, National Cultural Festival performances, Gyeonggi folk song choir performance, Seongho ideology academic contest, other events	Ansan City/Ansan Cultural Center
Ansan	Ansan Street Arts Festival	May	Ansan Street Arts Festival is street arts gala as a part of performing arts, which started in 2005 at Ansan and held in every May.	Ansan City/Ansan Culture Square area
Uijeongbu	Tongil Art Festival	June	Exhibition, traditional dance performance, Hanmaeum Citizen Singing Contest, composition contest, modern arts invitation	Art Assembly Uijeongbu Branch
Uijeongbu	Hoeryong Cultural Festival	October	Reproduction of royal parade, exhibition, dragon dance, yard drama	Uijeongbu Cultural Center
Uijeongbu	Uijeongbu International Music Performance Festival	May	Overseas group invitation/performance, college student showcase event, exhibition	Uijeongbu Arts Center
Namyangju	Dasan Cultural Festival	September~October	Awarding of Dasanmokmin Award, literature contest, traditional folk performance experience event	Namyangju City/Namyangju Cultural Center
Namyangju	Namyangju Outdoor Performance Festival	August	Invitation/performance of famous domestic/foreign performers, teenager get-together yard, experience event	Namyangju City
Gwangmyeong	Gureum Mt. Art Festival	October	National Music Festival, art exhibition, painting exhibition, picture exhibition, composition contest, student music contest, play performance, National Music Contest	Art Assembly Gwangmyeong Branch/Respective Associations
Gwangmyeong	Ori Cultural Festival	May	Lecture on the life and ideology of Lee Won-ik, yard games, picture drawing, musicals, shortened marathon, masque dance performance	Gwangmyeong Cultural Center
Siheung	Mulwang Art Festival	May	National music yard festival, literature and art event, citizen singing contest	Art Assembly Siheung Branch/Siheung City Hall
Siheung	Yeonseong Cultural Festival	October	Juvenile drama, composition contest, open concert, totem trimming and services	Siheung Cultural Center/Siheung City Hall
Gunpo	Gunpo Citizen's Grand Festival	April	Masquerade parade, street exhibition, village concert, silver festival, photography contest	Gunpo Cultural Information Department
Gunpo	Cheoljjuk Dongsan Festival	April	Exhibitions and concerts	Gunpo Cultural Information Department
Guri	Guri Han River Rape Flower Festival	May	Fly away butterflies, concerts, citizen singer contests, art, writing contest, photography contest, teenager rock concert	Guri/Korea Art Assembly Guri Branch
Guri	Guri Cosmos Festival	September	Eve celebration, Chinese arts circus, open-air movie appreciation, smiling picture photography, experience events	Guri/Korea Art Assembly Guri Branch
Hanam	Hanam Iseong Cultural Festival	September	Public broadcast attraction, provincial troupe performance, citizen performance, citizen participation yard	Hanam City Hall/Hanam Cultural Center
Uiwang	Uiwang Baekwun Art Festival	October	Walking on old street in Uiwang, I am an Artist Events: composition contest, sketch contest, fairy tale recital, puppet show, scenery games, making traditional toys, guitar performance	Uiwang Baekwun Art Festival Committee
Anseong	Anseong Namsadang Bawudeogi Festival	September	Art and science contest, taffy seller play, masque performance, tightrope walking performance, Baudeoki PR Hall, wayfaring male entertainer play of 6 yards, street play, general play, yard play, folk market and cattle market remake	Anseong
Anseong	Anseong Juksan International Art Festival	June	Dance, music, creative performance, Avantgarde Exhibition with globally famous artists, make-your-own-product with artists, film contest	Smile Stone Co., Ltd.
Anseong	Juksan Children Festival	May	For-children performance twice a day, experience	Festival Troupe Mucheon
Yangju	Yangju Traditional Culture and Art Festival	May	Intangible cultural assets and traditional folk art performance	Yangju Festival Committee
Yangju	Yangju Cultural Festival	October	Traditional folk art performance and participation event, unit event	Yangju Festival Committee
Osan	Doksanseong Culture and Art Festival	September	Art events such as culture event performance, citizen participation yard	Osan City/Osan Cultural Center
Yeoju	Sejong Cultural Grand Feast	October	Resident concert, Hangeul writing contest, empress travel, exhibitions, national picture subscription	Yeoju City, Yeoju Cultural Center Art Assembly Yeoju Branch
Yeoju	Yeoju Ceramics Exposition	May	Ceramics sales event, igniting of traditional oven, exhibition/performance event and experience event	Yeoju, Yeoju Ceramics Exposition
Yeoju	Yeoju Artifact Exhibition	October	Farm products exhibition, outstanding product sales, international sweet potato cooking contest, farming experience event (sweet potato tour)	Yeoju Artifact Exhibition Committee Yeoju Agricultural Technology Center
Yeoju	Myeongseong Empress Anniversary	October	Yeongsan memorial services, hyewon exorcism	Yeoju City, Yeoju Cultural Center
Paju	Yulgok Cultural Festival	September	Chuhyang ritual at Jawun Auditorium, art and science symposium, reconstruction of Confucian parade, Yulgok and Chinese poem writing contest, native writer invitation, calligraphy contest	Paju City/Paju Cultural Center
Paju	Paju Children Book Hanmadang	October	Publications exhibition and sales, book culture hanmadang, seminar games hanmadang, experience & study	Paju City, Paju Publication Complex
Paju	Heyri Festival	October	Art and plastic product exhibition at Heyri Village, construction tourism, performance, percussion, dance, play, classic jazz, workshop classrooms	Paju City, Paju Construction Committee, Heyri Festival Committee
Paju	Paju Art Festival	May	Music performance, national music performance, literature seminar, literary writing contest, art association member exhibition	Paju City/Paju Art Assembly
Dongducheon	Dongducheon Rock Festival	August	Multi-day concert event featuring local, national, and international rock music performances.	Dongducheon, Soyosan Tourist Resort

== Fauna ==
While Korean fauna is relatively uniform, there are some differences across the country. Animals living in Gyeonggi Province include the following.

=== Mammals ===
The raccoon dog is widespread in the province, as are the Japanese mole, Siberian weasel, water deer, Korean hare, red squirrel, house mouse, striped field mouse, and the Eurasian harvest mouse.

=== Birds ===
==== Waterfowl ====
The common merganser, common pochard, green-winged teal, Eastern spot-billed duck, mallard, mandarin, Taiga bean goose, tundra bean goose, whooper swan, great crested grebe, little grebe common moorhen, Eurasian coot, and white-breasted waterhen all inhabit the province.

==== Herons and cormorants ====
Herons frequent the provinces waterways. These include the black-crowned night heron, great white egret, grey heron, little egret, medium egret, striated heron, great cormorant, and Japanese cormorant.

==== Raptors ====
Raptors in Gyeonggi Province include the Eurasian sparrowhawk, Goshawk, common kestrel, and Eurasian hobby.

==== Crows and jays ====
A range of crows and jays are found in Gyeonggi Province, including the azure-winged magpie carrion crow, Eurasian jay, large-billed crow, Oriental magpie, and rook.

==== Tits ====
There are also many tits in the province, including the coal tit, Japanese tit, marsh tit, and varied tit.

==== Others ====
Other birds in Gyeonggi Province include the common sandpiper, long-toed stint, wood sandpiper, ring-necked pheasant, white-winged tern, Oriental turtle dove, rock dove, Oriental dollarbird, common kingfisher, common hoopoe great spotted woodpecker, grey-headed woodpecker Japanese pygmy woodpecker, black-naped oriole, Eurasian skylark, brown-eared bulbul, long-tailed tit, Oriental reed warbler, vinous-throated parrotbill, white-cheeked starling, dusky thrush, Asian brown flycatcher, Daurian redstart, Eurasian tree sparrow, brambling, and Oriental greenfinch.

=== Reptiles ===
The river cooter, peninsula cooter, Amur softshell turtle, and pond slider live in the province's lakes and streams, while the steppe rat snake and mountain grass lizard are among its land-dwelling reptiles.

=== Amphibia ===
Gyeonggi Province has a variety of amphibia: the Boreal digging frog, Imienpo Station frog, Korean brown frog, Suwon tree frog, and Sakhalin toad.

=== Arachnids ===
The province has a variety of spiders, including the Joro spider, Sernokorba allidipatellis, and Uroctea lesserti.

=== Insects ===
==== Moths ====
A wide range of moths live in Gyeonggi Province, e.g., the box tree moth, euonymus defoliator moth, gypsy moth, larch hawk moth, meal moth, rush veneer, Monema flavescens, Nordstromia duplicata, Orthogonia sera, Ostrinia palustralis, Sinna extrema, and Striglina cancellata.

==== Butterflies ====
Butterflies in the province include the Asian comma, common straight swift, lesser purple emperor, painted lady, pale grass blue, Pallas' sailer, red ring skirt, small white, and Colias poliographus.

==== Bees, wasps, and hornets ====
Gyeonggi Province's bees, wasps, and hornets include the western honey bee, dark-waisted paper wasp, Asian hornet, European hornet, and yellow-vented hornet.

==== Ants ====
There is a wide variety of ant species in Gyeonggi Province. These include the Asian needle ant, Japanese carpenter ant, Japanese pavement ant, Japanese queenless ant, yellow-footed ant, Aphaenogaster japonica, Camponotus concavus, Camponotus itoi, Camponotus nipponensis, Camponotus quadrinotatus, Crematogaster matsumurai, Crematogaster teranishii, Dolichoderus sibiricus, Lasius spathepus, Temnothorax wui, and Vollenhovia emeryi.

==== Damselflies and dragonflies ====
The province's damselflies and dragonflies include the common bluetail, Ischnura asiatica, Platycnemis phyllopoda, blue-spotted emperor foot-tipped darter, regal pond cruiser, white-tailed skimmer, Deielia phaon, and Sympetrum infuscatum.

==== Others ====
Other insects in the province include Eristalis cerealis, the Chinese rice grasshopper, Oriental longheaded grasshopper, sickle-bearing bush-cricket, greenhouse camel cricket, Loxoblemmus arietulus, black cicada, Asian jumping mantis, giant Asian mantis, turnip sawfly, Promachus yesonicus, Spotted lanternfly, green stink bug, sloe bug, Sastragala esakii, Placosternum esakii, Lygocorides rubronasutus, harlequin lady beetle, seven-spot ladybird, turtle vein lady beetle, Calvia muiri, Pheropsophus javanus, Scirtes japonicus, 'varied carpet beetle, citrus long-horned beetle, thin-winged longicorn beetle, mealworm, German cockroach, Blattella nipponica, Adoretus hirsutus, Eusilpha jakowlewi, Dryophilocoris kerzhneri, bean bug, western conifer seed bug, marsh rhopalid, Deraeocoris salicis, Oriental beetle, black planthopper, and lake pondskater.

=== Molluscs ===
Taiwan pond mussels live in Gyeonggi Province's freshwater.

=== Fish ===
The province's lakes and streams house Amur catfish, Eurasian carp, largemouth bass, northern snakehead, and pale chub.

== Sisterhood relations ==
- Utah, United States
- Aichi Prefecture, Japan
- Kanagawa Prefecture, Japan
- Liaoning, People's Republic of China
- North Holland, Netherlands
- Gauteng, South Africa
- State of Mexico, Mexico
- Virginia, United States
- Alto Paraná Department, Paraguay
- Queensland, Australia
- Catalonia, Spain
- Florida, United States
- Guangdong, People's Republic of China
- British Columbia, Canada
- Hebei, People's Republic of China
- Shandong, People's Republic of China
- Taiwan Province, Republic of China (Taiwan)
- Pahang, Malaysia
