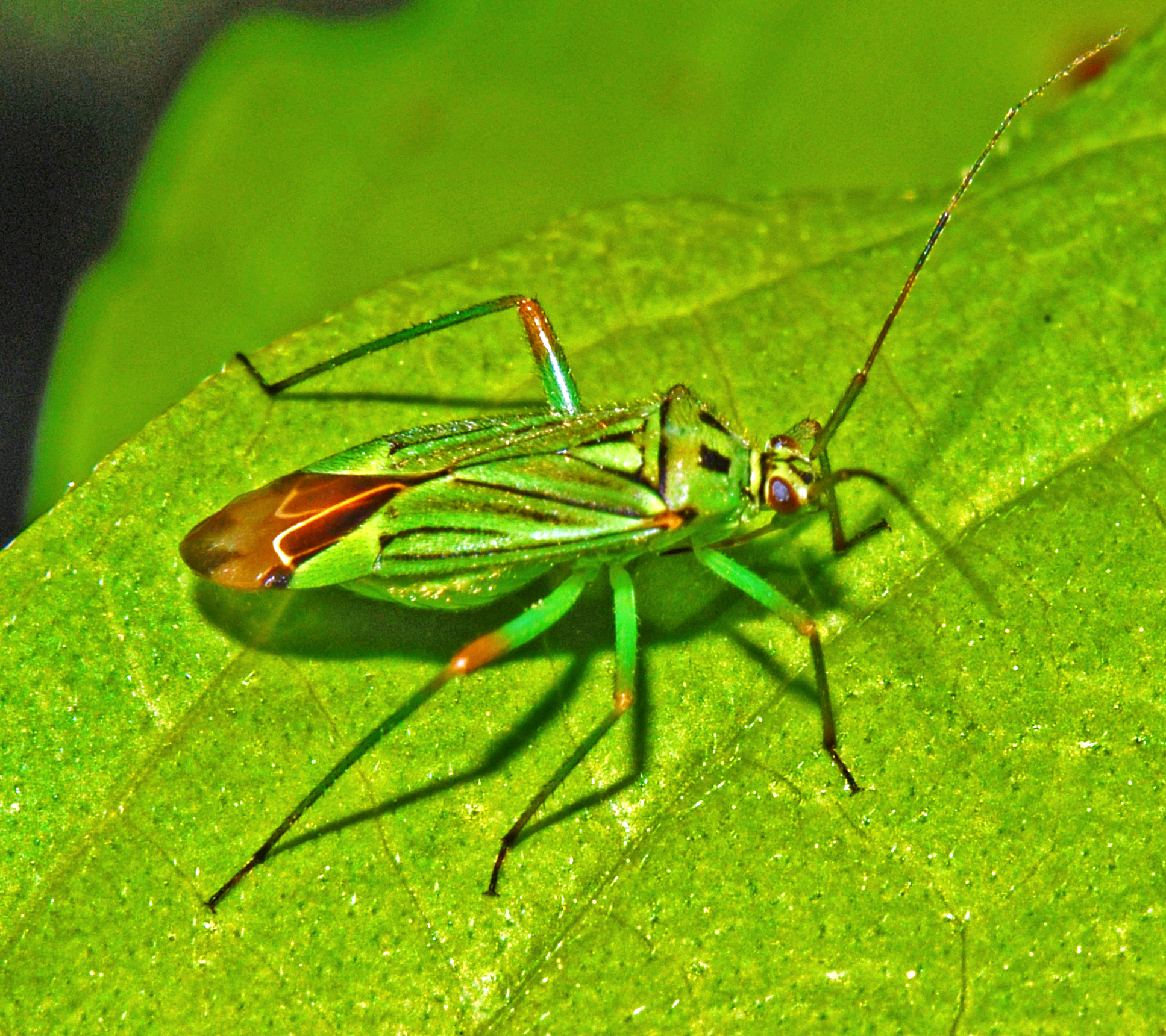
- Mermitelocerus schmidtii

Scientific classification
- Kingdom: Animalia
- Phylum: Arthropoda
- Class: Insecta
- Order: Hemiptera
- Suborder: Heteroptera
- Family: Miridae
- Subfamily: Mirinae
- Tribe: Mirini
- Genus: Mermitelocerus; Reuter, 1908

= Mermitelocerus =

Genus of true bugs

Mermitelocerus is a genus of plant bug belonging to the family Miridae.

== Species ==
- Mermitelocerus schmidtii Fieber, 1836
- Mermitelocerus annulipes Reuter 1908
- Mermitelocerus viridis Yasunaga & Miyamoto 1991
