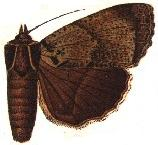

Scientific classification
- Kingdom: Animalia
- Phylum: Arthropoda
- Class: Insecta
- Order: Lepidoptera
- Superfamily: Noctuoidea
- Family: Noctuidae
- Genus: Orthogonia
- Species: O. grisea

Binomial name
- Orthogonia grisea Leech, 1900

Synonyms
- Orthogonia sera var. grisea Leech, 1900

= Orthogonia grisea =

Species of moth

Orthogonia grisea is a moth of the family Noctuidae. It is known from Sichuan, China. Its type locality is Mount Emei.
