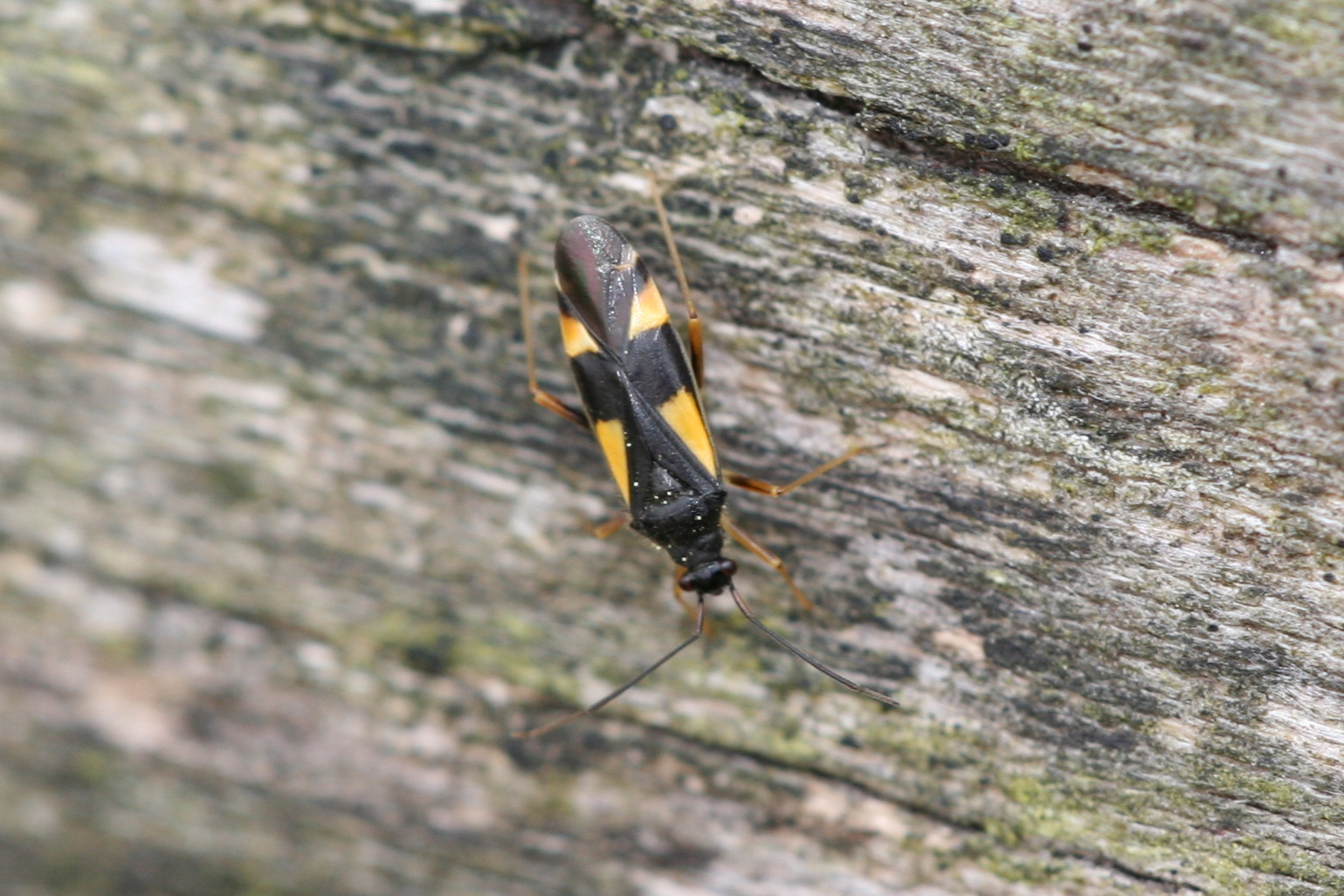
- Dryophilocoris flavoquadrimaculatus

Scientific classification
- Kingdom: Animalia
- Phylum: Arthropoda
- Clade: Pancrustacea
- Class: Insecta
- Order: Hemiptera
- Suborder: Heteroptera
- Family: Miridae
- Genus: Dryophilocoris; Reuter, 1875

Type species
- Capsus flavoquadrimaculatus De Geer, 1773

= Dryophilocoris =

Genus of true bugs

Dryophilocoris is a genus of plant bugs in the family Miridae, subfamily Orthotylinae, tribe Orthotylini. The genus was erected by the Finnish entomologist Odo Morannal Reuter in his 1875 Revisio critica Capsinarum, with Dryophilocoris flavoquadrimaculatus (De Geer, 1773) designated as the type species. Members of the genus occur across the Palearctic realm, with the greatest species diversity in East Asia and a smaller number of representatives in Europe.

== Description ==
Species of Dryophilocoris are small to medium-sized plant bugs, with the type species measuring roughly 6–7 mm in length. Adults of most species are predominantly black or dark brown with contrasting pale yellow markings on the hemelytra. The pronotum is conspicuously raised at its posterior margin, and both the pronotum and forewings are clothed in long, fine, erect setae; adults are always macropterous. Female genitalia were first illustrated and used as taxonomic characters for the genus by Jung et al. (2010), who showed the shape of the sclerotized rings and the K-structure to be diagnostically useful.

== Distribution and ecology ==
Dryophilocoris is restricted to the Palearctic, with its center of diversity in the Russian Far East, the Korean Peninsula, Japan, and parts of China; two species (D. flavoquadrimaculatus and D. luteus) occur in Europe. Species are phytophagous and are most commonly associated with oaks (Quercus); D. flavoquadrimaculatus is widespread on oak across temperate Europe and the British Isles in May and June, where it also takes small prey opportunistically.

== Species ==
The genus contains the following species:

- Dryophilocoris alni Zou, 1986
- Dryophilocoris flavoquadrimaculatus (De Geer, 1773)
- Dryophilocoris jenjouristi Kerzhner, 1988
- Dryophilocoris kanyukovae Kerzhner, 1988
- Dryophilocoris kerzhneri Jung & Yasunaga, 2010
- Dryophilocoris limbatus Linnavuori, 1961
- Dryophilocoris longus Zou, 1986
- Dryophilocoris lucidus Yasunaga, 1999
- Dryophilocoris luteus (Herrich-Schäffer, 1836)
- Dryophilocoris miyamotoi Yasunaga, 1999
- Dryophilocoris pallidulus Josifov & Kerzhner, 1984
- Dryophilocoris persimilis Zou, 1986
- Dryophilocoris saigusai Miyamoto, 1966
- Dryophilocoris zebrinus Zou, 1986
