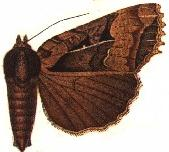

Scientific classification
- Kingdom: Animalia
- Phylum: Arthropoda
- Class: Insecta
- Order: Lepidoptera
- Superfamily: Noctuoidea
- Family: Noctuidae
- Genus: Orthogonia
- Species: O. plumbinotata

Binomial name
- Orthogonia plumbinotata (Hampson, 1908)

Synonyms
- Orthogonica plumbinotata Hampson, 1908

= Orthogonia plumbinotata =

Species of moth

Orthogonia plumbinotata is a moth of the family Noctuidae. It is found in China.
