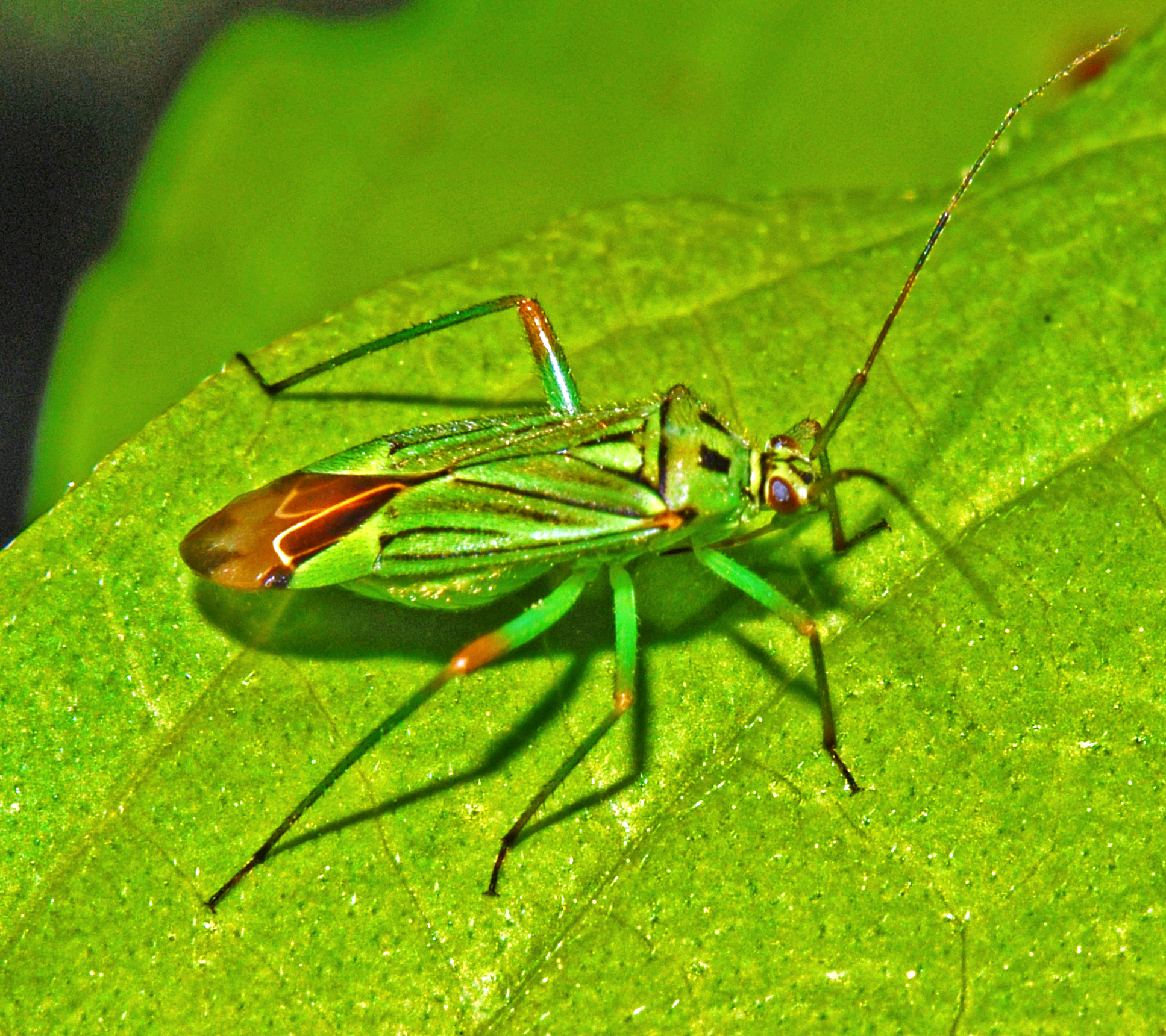
- Mermitelocerus schmidtii, dorsal view

Scientific classification
- Kingdom: Animalia
- Phylum: Arthropoda
- Class: Insecta
- Order: Hemiptera
- Suborder: Heteroptera
- Family: Miridae
- Genus: Mermitelocerus
- Species: M. schmidtii

Binomial name
- Mermitelocerus schmidtii Fieber, 1836

Synonyms
- Phytocoris schmidtii Fieber, 1836; Calocoris schmidti (Fieber, 1836)

= Mermitelocerus schmidtii =

Species of true bug

Mermitelocerus schmidtii is a species of plant bug belonging to the family Miridae.

== Distribution ==
This species is present in most of Europe (Austria, Belgium, Bosnia and Herzegovina, Bulgaria, Croatia, Czech Republic, Denmark, France, Germany, Greece, Hungary, Italy. Luxembourg, Republic of Moldova, Poland, Romania, Slovakia, Slovenia, Netherlands and Ukraine). It can also be found in the Caucasus and in Central Asia.

== Habitat ==
These insects inhabit forest edges and light open areas.

== Description ==
Mermitelocerus schmidtii can reach a body length of 7.3–8 millimetres (0.29–0.31 in). These small bugs are green with black longitudinal markings on the hemielytra. Head is green with two black stripes. Pronotum is light green, with two black dots, a black stripe in the width and a black spot on the side. Scutellum shows a black central line and a black border. The membrane is dark with light green veins. Legs are mainly green, but the thighs are partially orange.

== Biology ==
Mermitelocerus schmidtii is a univoltine species, overwintering as an egg. Adults can be found from mid-May to early July. These bugs are zoophytophagous, mainly feeding on ash (Fraxinus excelsior) and various other deciduous trees such as hawthorn (Crataegus sp.), maple (Acer sp.) and buckthorn (Rhamnus frangula, Rhamnus cathartica), elm (Ulmus ssp.) and hassel (Corylus avellana), but also on common nettle (Urtica dioica). They suck the inflorescences and feed on leaf fleas (Psylloidea), aphids (Aphidoidea), caterpillars of butterflies and other small arthropods.

== Gallery ==
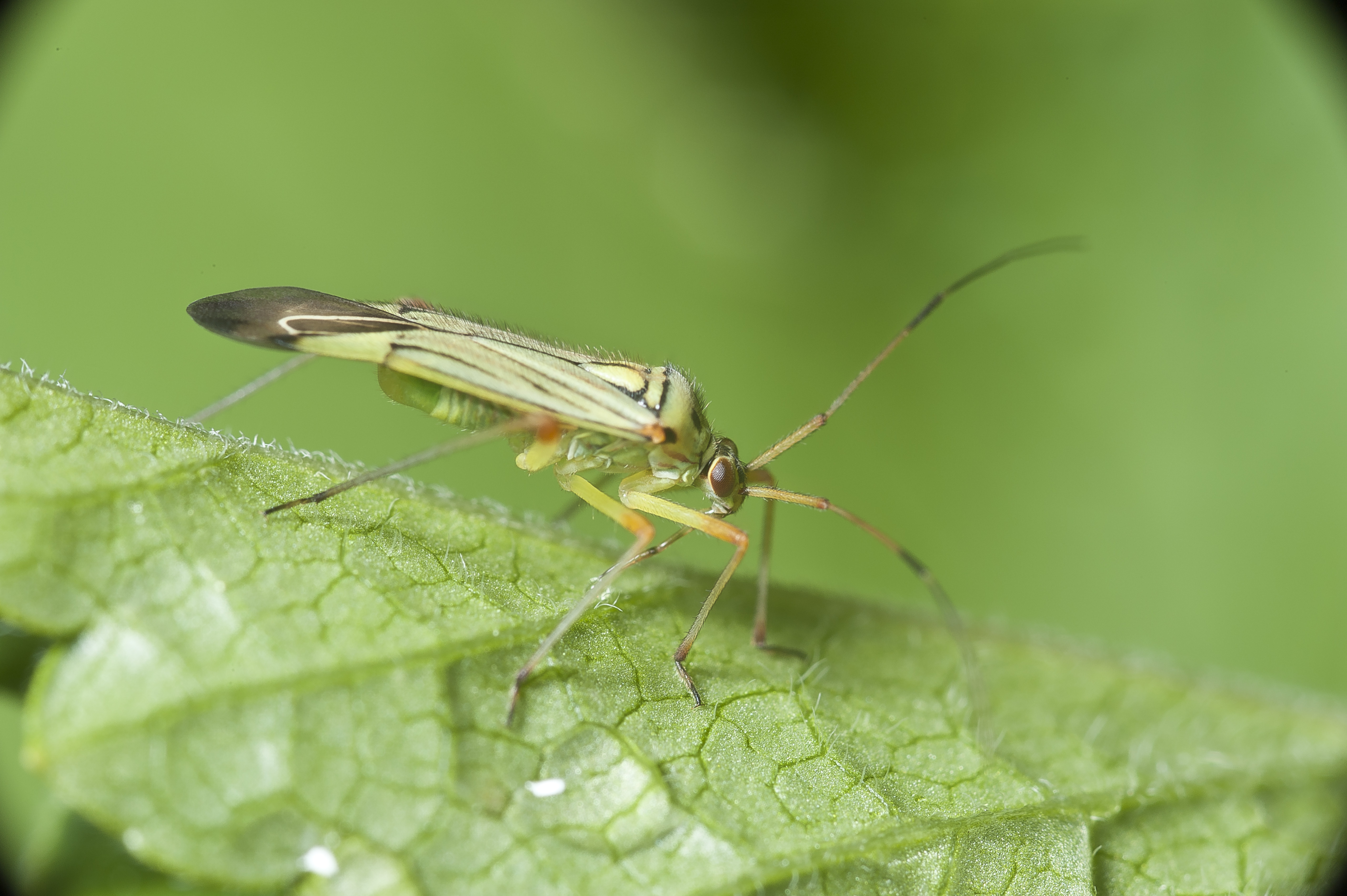
Side view

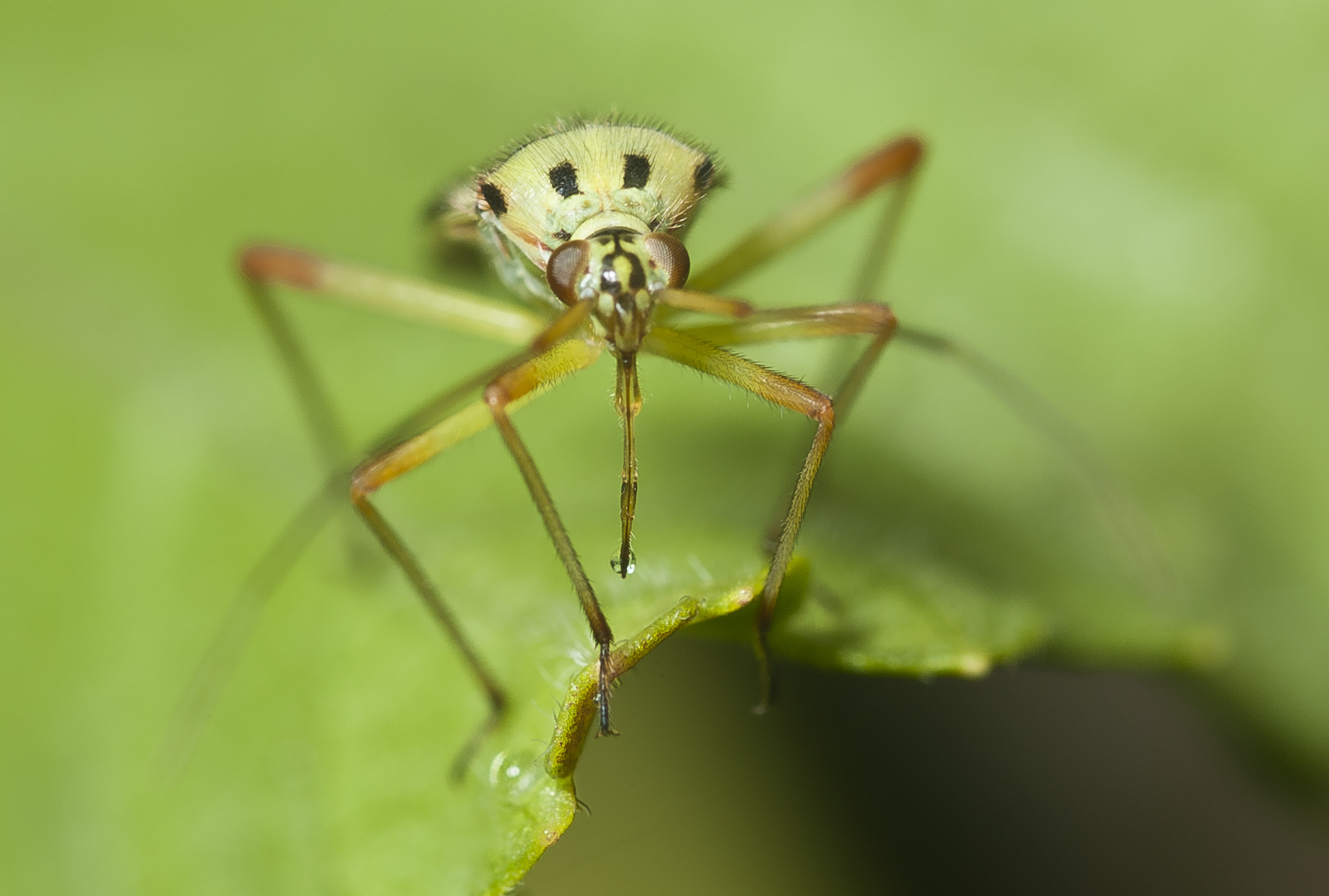
Front view
