= Yeoninsan =

Mountain in South Korea

Coordinates: 37°53′58″N 127°24′52″E

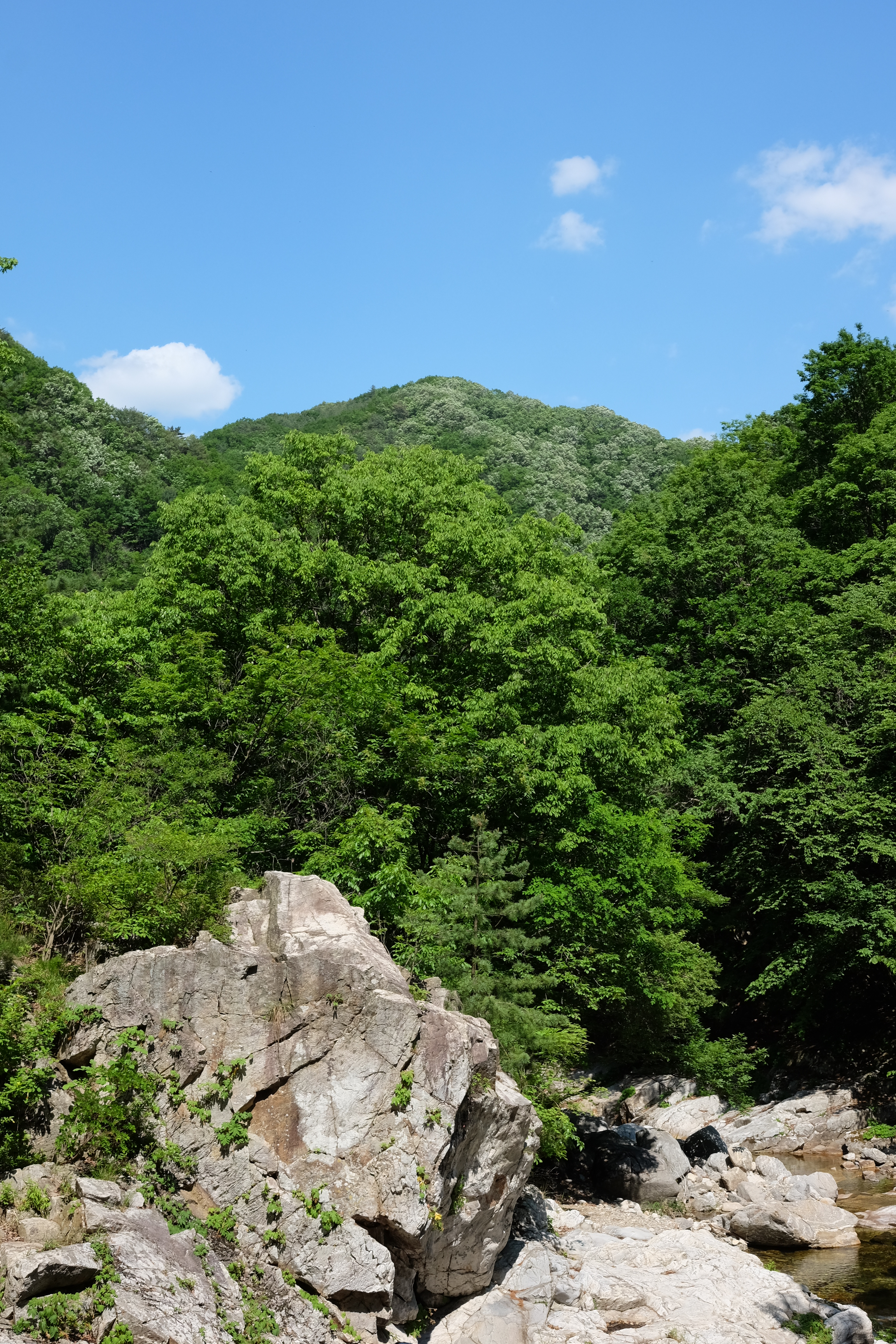

Highest point
- Elevation: 1,068 m (3,504 ft)

Geography
- Location: South Korea

Korean name
- Hangul: 연인산
- Hanja: 戀人山
- RR: Yeoninsan
- MR: Yŏninsan

Yeoninsan, alternatively Yoninsan, is a mountain in Gapyeong County, Gyeonggi Province in South Korea. It has an elevation of 737 m (2,418 ft).

== Gallery ==
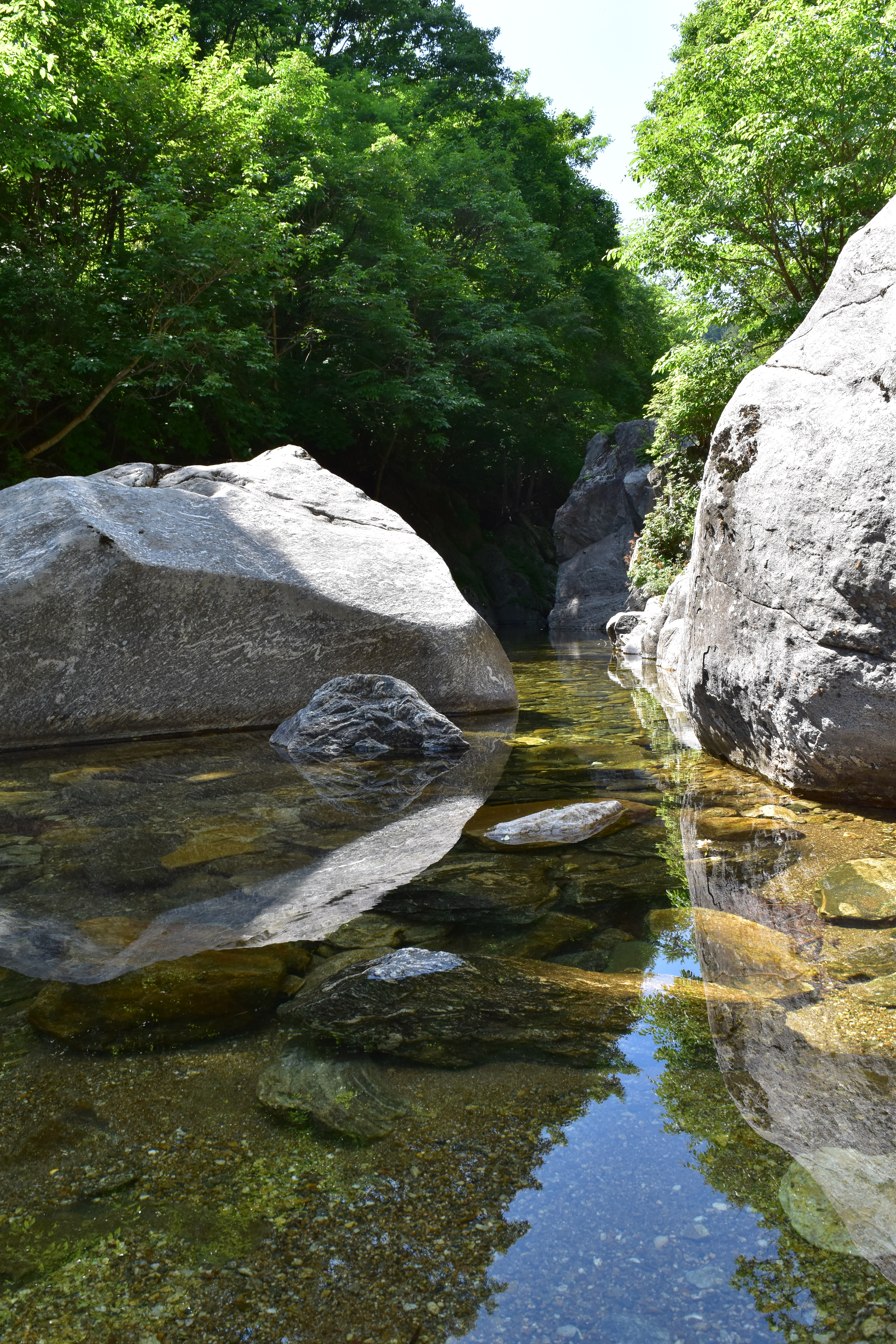

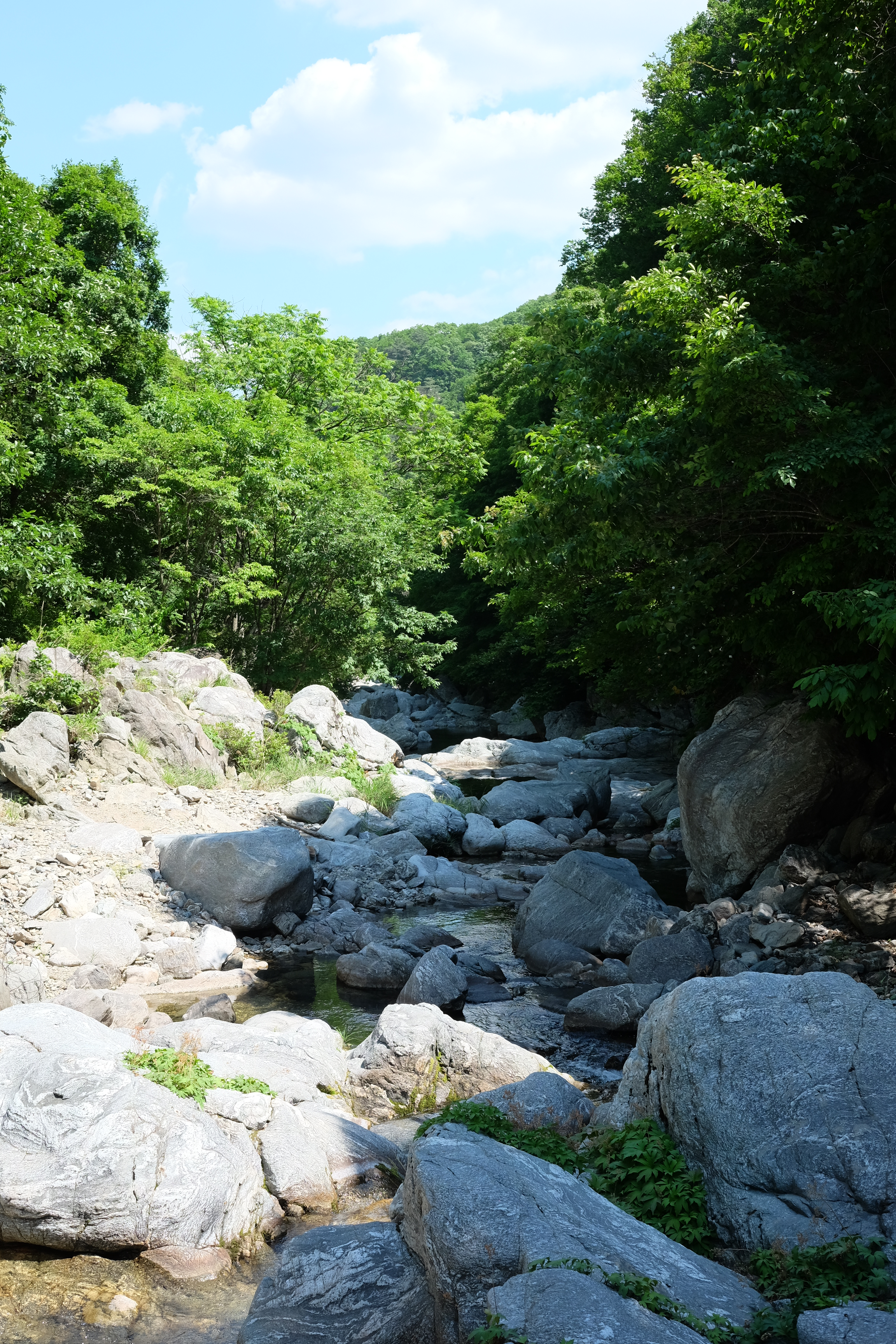

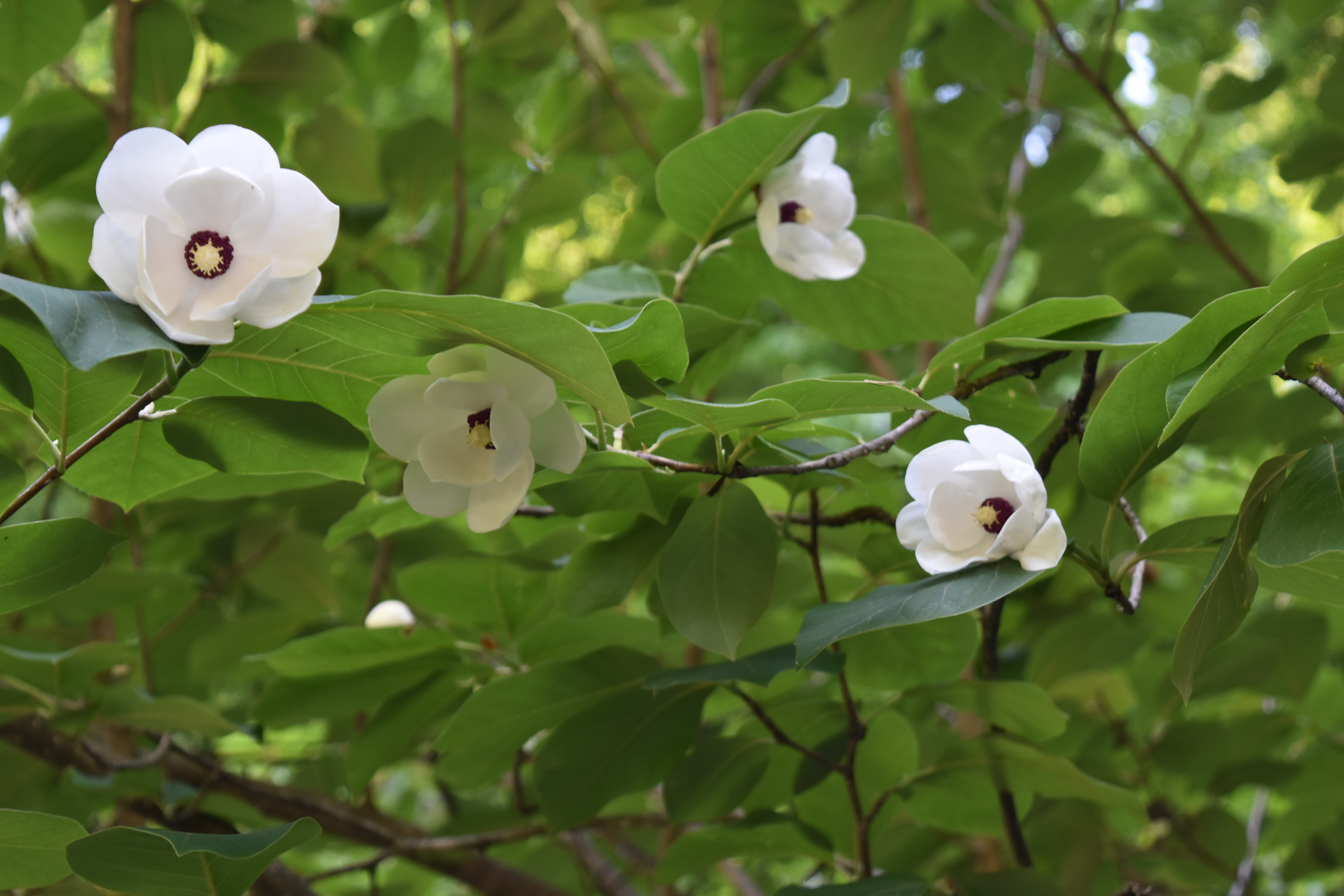

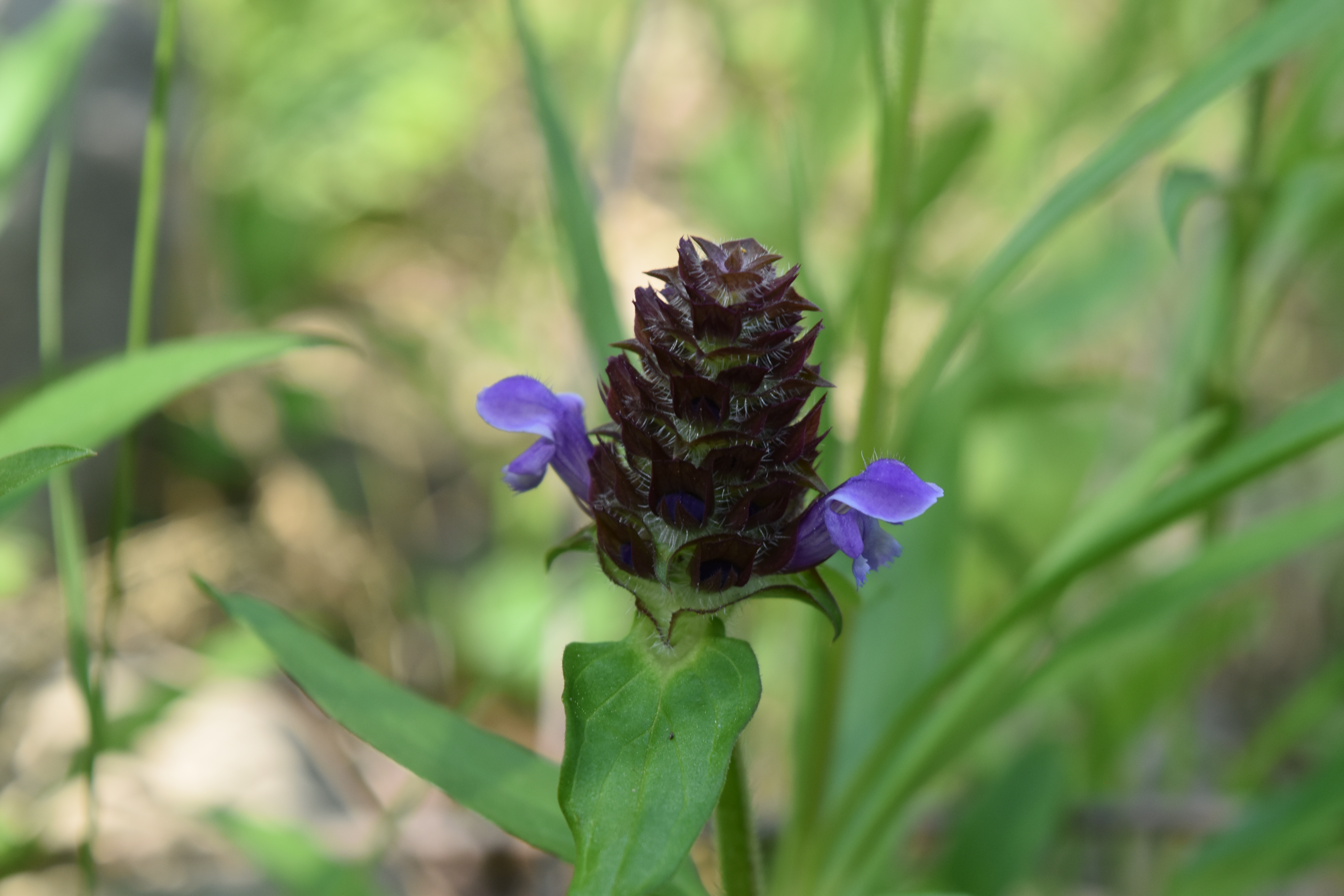

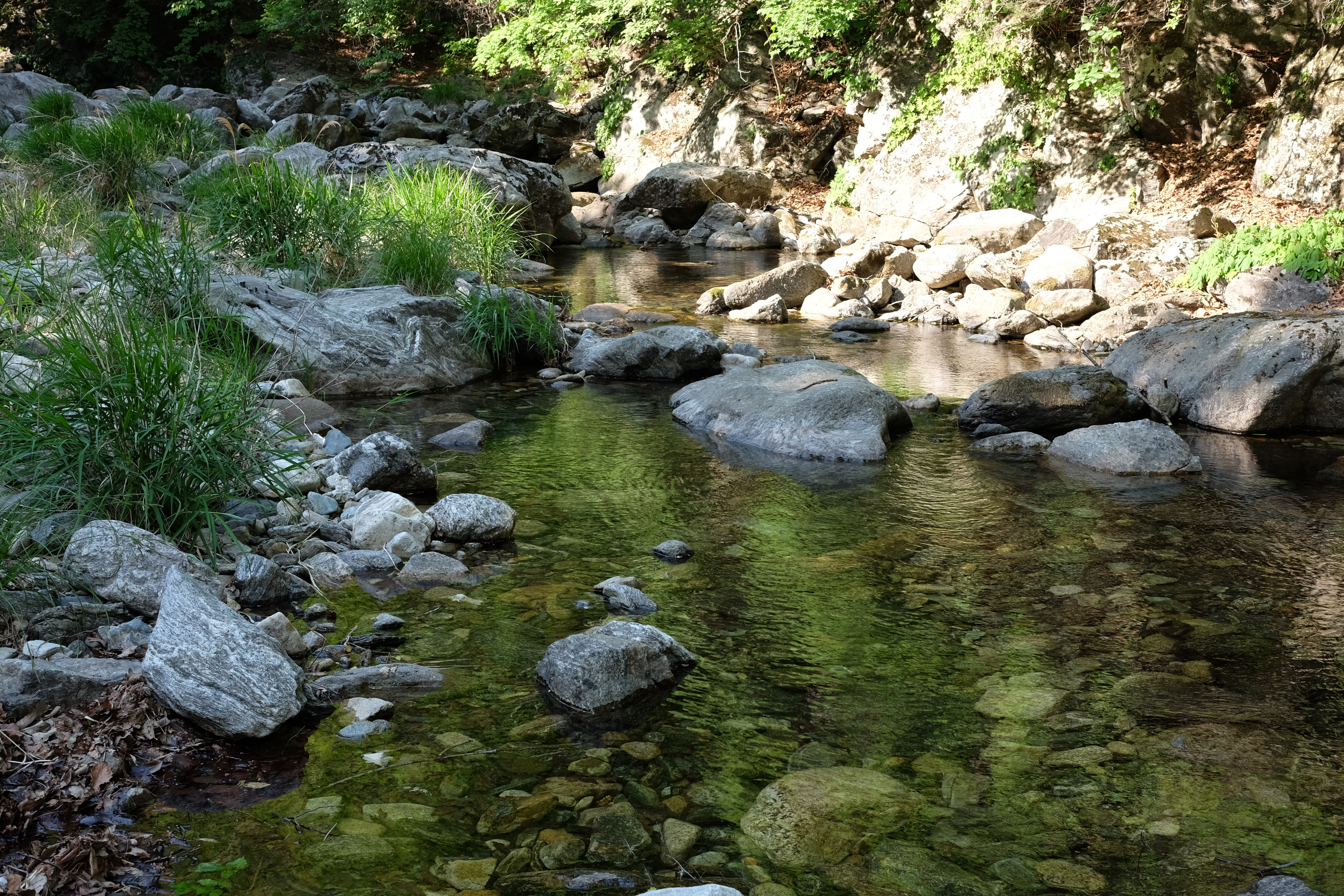

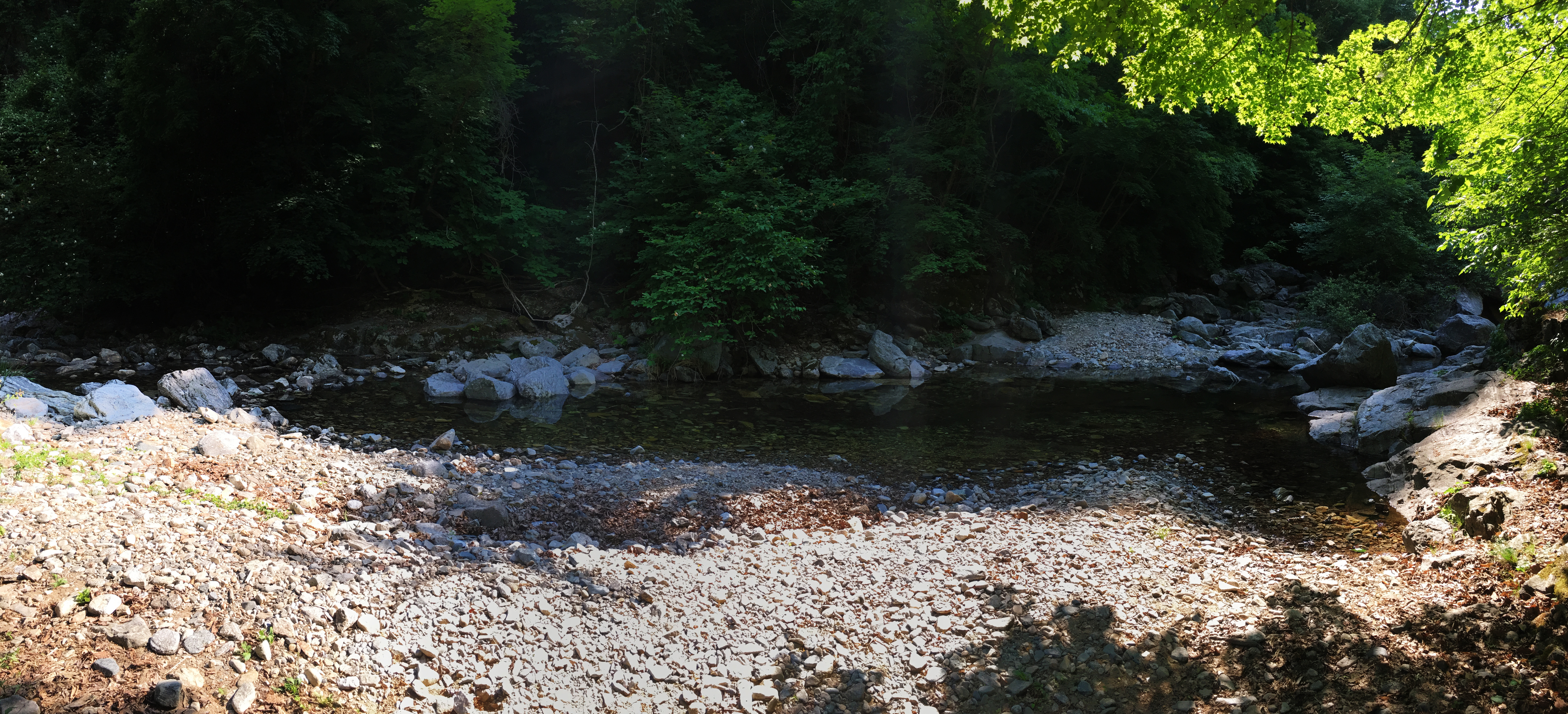

== See also ==
- List of mountains in Korea
