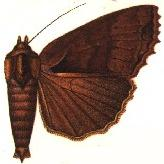

Scientific classification
- Kingdom: Animalia
- Phylum: Arthropoda
- Class: Insecta
- Order: Lepidoptera
- Superfamily: Noctuoidea
- Family: Noctuidae
- Genus: Orthogonia
- Species: O. plana

Binomial name
- Orthogonia plana Leech, 1900

Synonyms
- Orthogonia sera var. plana Leech, 1900; Orthogonia griseobrunnea Strand, 1921; Orthogonia olivaceobrunnea Strand, 1921; Orthogonia postmedealis Strand, 1921; Orthogonia carneata Warren, 1911; Orthogonia semigrisea Warren, 1911; Orthogonia suffusa Warren, 1911

= Orthogonia plana =

Species of moth

Orthogonia plana is a moth of the family Noctuidae, described from China by John Henry Leech in 1900. It occurs in Western China.
