= Partition of Gyeonggi Province =

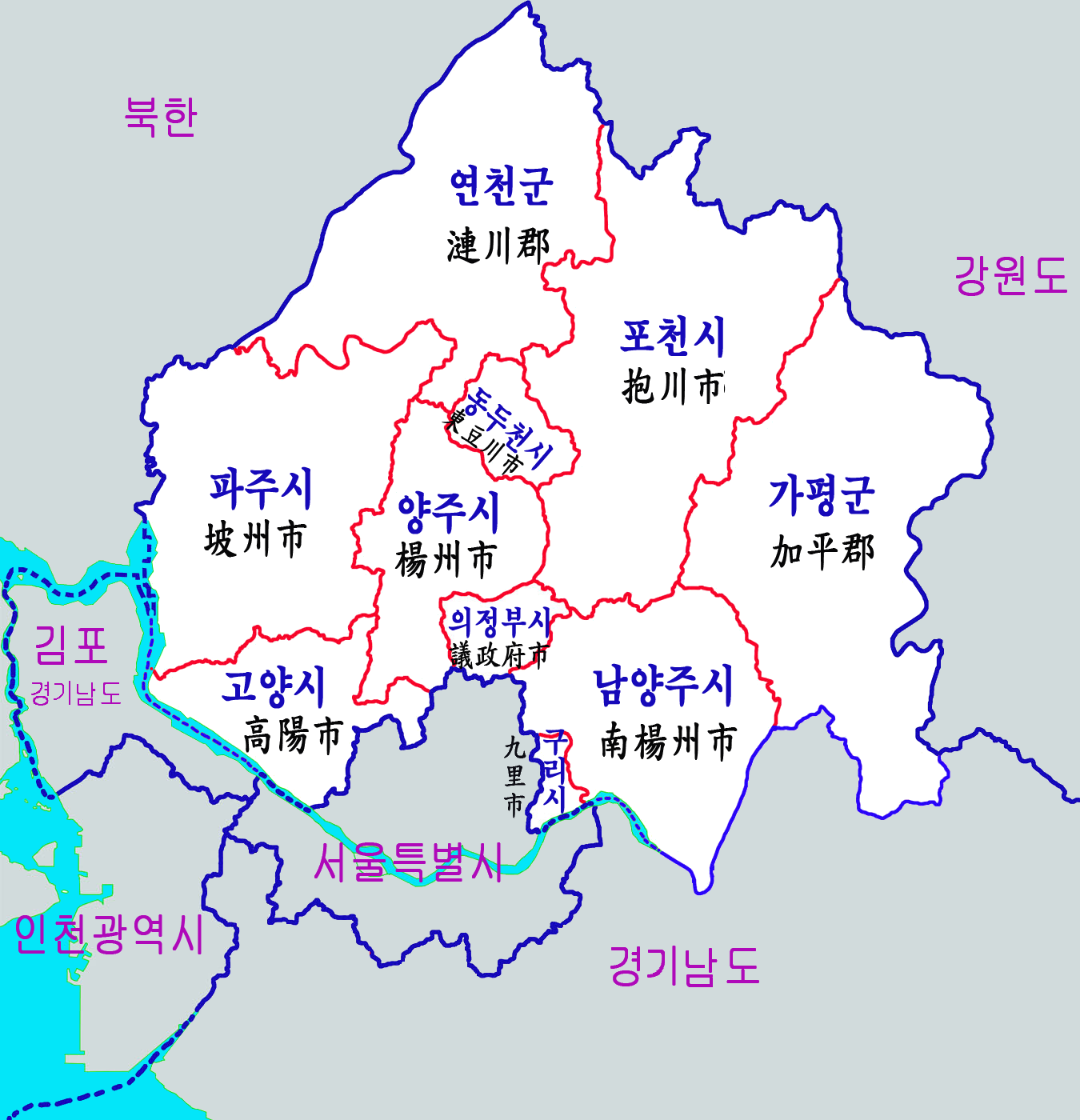
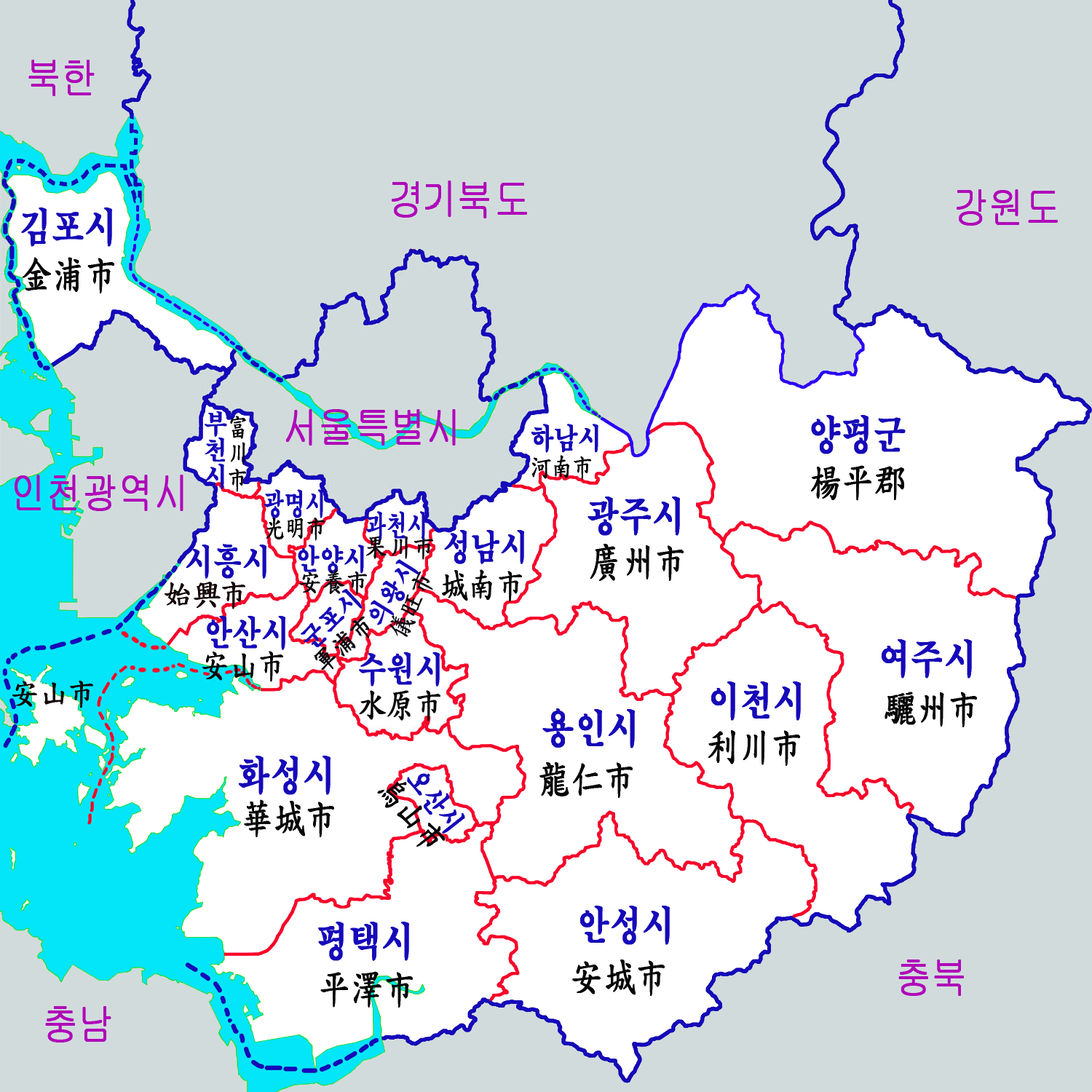
proposed North Gyeonggi Province and South Gyeonggi Province

Gyeonggi Province is the most populous province in South Korea. It has been the subject of proposals to divide it into two provinces since 1987.

During the 1992 South Korean presidential election, Kim Young-sam and Kim Dae-jung made a promise to establish North Gyeonggi Province.

In 2014, the Council of Gyeonggi Province sponsored its partition, However this plan was opposed by the provincial governor Nam Kyung-pil.

== See also ==
- Partition of California
