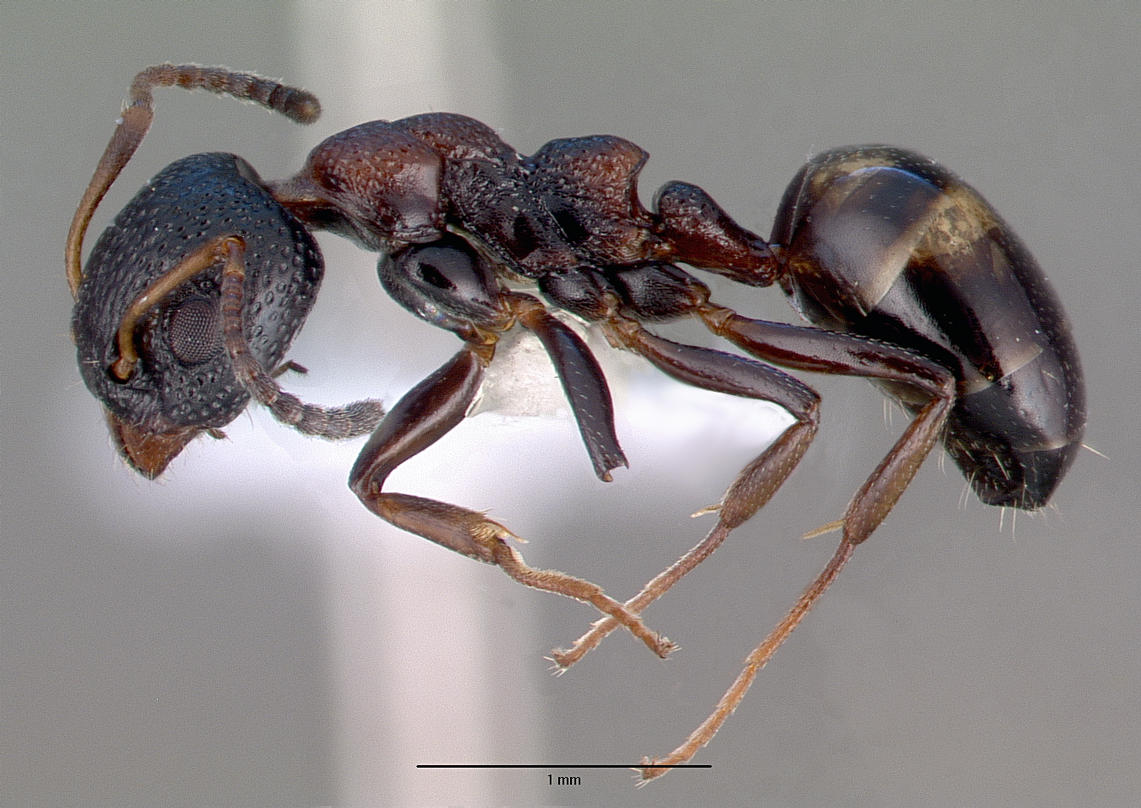

Scientific classification
- Kingdom: Animalia
- Phylum: Arthropoda
- Clade: Pancrustacea
- Class: Insecta
- Order: Hymenoptera
- Family: Formicidae
- Subfamily: Dolichoderinae
- Genus: Dolichoderus
- Species: D. sibiricus

Binomial name
- Dolichoderus sibiricus Emery, 1889

Synonyms
- Dolichoderus abietis Kono & Sugihara, 1939; Dolichoderus quadripunctatus japonicus Yoshioka, 1939; Dolichoderus quadripunctatus yoshiokae Wheeler, W.M., 1933; Dolichoderus sinensis Wheeler, W.M., 1921; Dolichoderus sinensis atriceps Wheeler, W.M., 1928

= Dolichoderus sibiricus =

Species of ant

Dolichoderus sibiricus is a species of ant in the subfamily Dolichoderinae. Described by Carlo Emery in 1889, the species is found in China, North Korea, Japan, Mongolia, South Korea, Siberia (Russian Federation), and Taiwan.
