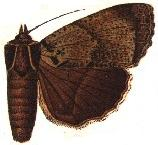
- Orthogonia grisea

Scientific classification
- Domain: Eukaryota
- Kingdom: Animalia
- Phylum: Arthropoda
- Class: Insecta
- Order: Lepidoptera
- Superfamily: Noctuoidea
- Family: Noctuidae
- Genus: Orthogonia; C. & R. Felder, 1862

= Orthogonia =

Genus of moths

Orthogonia is a genus of moths of the family Noctuidae.

== Species ==
- Orthogonia basimacula (Draudt, 1939)
- Orthogonia canimaculata Warren, 1911
- Orthogonia denormata (Draudt, 1939)
- Orthogonia grisea Leech, 1900
- Orthogonia plana Leech, 1900
- Orthogonia plumbinotata (Hampson, 1908)
- Orthogonia sera C. & R. Felder, 1862
- Orthogonia tapaishana (Draudt, 1939)
