= Bucheon FMC Best WFC =

2010 South Korean football club

Bucheon FMC Best 부천시 시설관리공단 BEST
- Full name: Bucheon Facilities Management Corporation Women's Football Club 부천시 시설관리공단 BEST 여자축구단
- Founded: March 3, 2010
- Dissolved: 2010
- Ground: Bucheon Leports Complex
- Capacity: 35,545
- Owner: (South Korea) Hong Kun-Pyo (Mayor)
- Chairman: (South Korea) Jeon Young-Pyo

Bucheon FMC Best WFC, full name Bucheon Facilities Management Corporation BEST Women's Football Club (Korean: 부천시 시설관리공단 BEST 여자축구단) was a South Korean women's football team based in Bucheon.

== History ==
Bucheon FMC Best was founded on March 3, 2010, with sporting goods manufacturer Nassau Co. as the main sponsor. At the time of its official launch the team had 18 players recruited from among university graduates and free agents, and planned to participate in the 2011 WK League. Bucheon participated in the 2010 National Women's Football Tournament in Hapcheon County. In October 2010, only a few months after the club's foundation, Bucheon Facilities Management Corporation announced its disbandment, citing issues at Bucheon City Hall as the reason.
