= Odo Reuter =

Odo Morannal Reuter
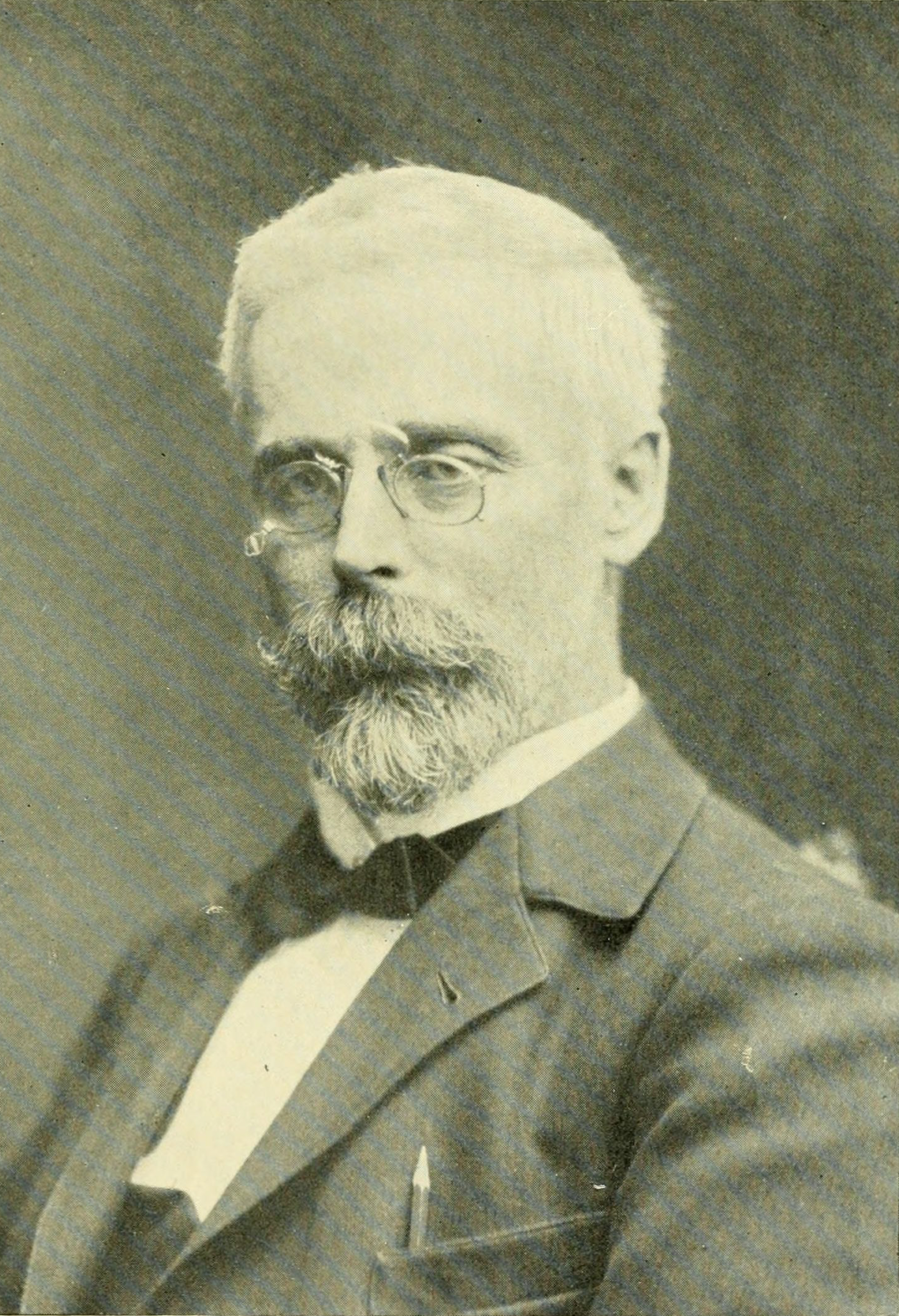
- Born: 28 April 1850; Åbo, Finland
- Died: 2 September 1913 (aged 63); Åbo, Finland
- Scientific career
- Fields: Zoology

Signature
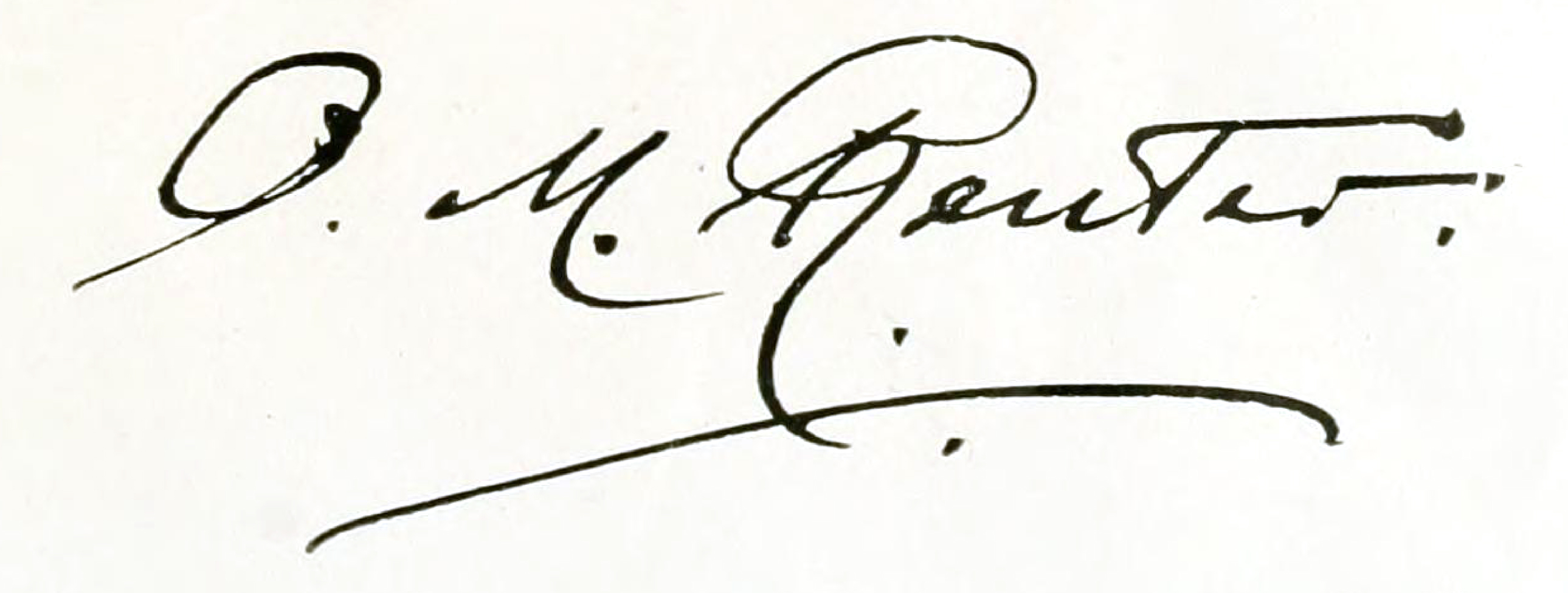

Odo Morannal Reuter (28 April 1850 – 2 September 1913) was a Finland Swedish zoologist and poet. He was a specialist on the heteropteran bugs.

== Early life ==
Reuter was born in Åbo (Turku) on 28 April 1850, and died there on 2 September 1913.

He became a student at the University of Helsinki in 1867. He gained his master's degree in philology in 1873, followed by a doctorate in zoology in 1877, when he became an associate professor of zoology.

== Career ==
Reuter was a hemipterist, a specialist in mirid plant bugs, becoming the world's leading expert in this group at his time. He coined the term "parasitoid" to describe the way of life of species such as many wasps which feed on but do not immediately kill their prey. He published nearly 445 papers by 1907 most dealing with the Hemiptera.

In addition to systematics, he took an interest in movement and nutrition in insects. He also wrote popular natural science works for the general public.

He was dismissed from his position in 1910 due to prolonged leave on account of illness. He formally retired in 1910 due to long-term health problems. His enthusiasm remained, and in 1911, despite his blindness, he published Nattens sånger (Night's Songs) describing the experiences of his latter years. He died on 2 September 1913 in Turku.

== Works ==
Reuter's many publications on entomology include:

- Revisio critica Capsinarum praecipue Scandinaviae et Fenniae, väitöskirja. 1875
- Hemiptera Gymnoceratae Europae I-V. 1878–1896
- Ad cognitionem Reduviidarum. 1881
- Monographia Anthocoridarum orbis terrestris. 1885
- Nya rön om myrornas omtviflade medlidande och hjälpsamhet. 1888 (in Swedish)
- Revisio synonymica Heteropterarum palearcticarum. 1888
- Corrodentia Fennica. 1892
- Ängsmasken, dess härjningar i Finland och medlen till deras bekämpande. Finska Hushållningssällskapet, Åbo 1892 (in Swedish)
- Monographia Ceratocombidarum orbis terrestris. 1893
- Monographia generis Holotrichius Burm. 1893
- Monographia generis Reduvius Fabr., Lam. 1893
- Ängsmasken 2, Berättelse öfver en på K. Finska hushållningssällskapets bekostnad sommaren 1892 företagen resa i och för studium af ängsmasken och de naturenliga medlen till dess utrotande. Finska Hushållningssällskapet, Åbo 1893 (in Swedish)
- Ängsmasken 3, Berättelse öfver på K. Finska hushållningssällskapet bekostnad sommaren 1893 företagna undersökningar om ängsmasken och medlen till dess utrotande. Finska Hushållningssällskapet, Åbo 1894 (in Swedish)
- Neuroptera fennica : förteckning och beskrifning öfver Finlands Neuropterer. 1894 (in Swedish)
- Species palæarcticae generis Acanthia Fabr., Latr. 1895
- Species palaearcticae generis Acanthia Fabr., Latr. dispositae. 1896
- Skadeinsekter i våra fruktträdgårdar. 1897 (in Swedish)
- Thysaunoptera Fennica : förteckning och beskrifning öfver finska Thysanoptera. 1898–1899 (in Swedish)
- Monographia generis Heteropterorum Phimodera Germ. Cum tabulis duabus. 1908
- Monographia Nabidarum orbis terrestris : pars prior : cum tabula colorata. 1910 (B. Poppiuksen kanssa)
- Insekternas levnadsvanor och instinkter intill gryningen av de sociala instinkterna. 1913 (in Swedish)

He also wrote literary criticism, travel guides and poetry. His last works were produced when he was blind.
