= 2026 WK League =

South Korean association football league season

WK League
- Season: 2026
- Dates: 4 April – 31 October 2026
- Champions: Gyeongju KHNP (1st title)
- Runner up: Suwon FC
- Champions League: Gyeongju KHNP
- Matches: 112
- Goals: 271 (2.42 per match)
- Top goalscorer: Haruhi Suzuki (12 goals)
- Biggest home win: Suwon 6–0 Sejong
- Biggest away win: Gangjin 1–6 Suwon
- Highest scoring: Gyeongju 6–1 Gangjin; Gangjin 1–6 Suwon
- Longest winning run: 7 matches Hwacheon
- Longest unbeaten run: 16 matches Hwacheon
- Longest winless run: 14 matches Incheon
- Longest losing run: 7 matches Gangjin
- Average attendance: 287
- (Note: All statistics do not include play-off matches)

The 2026 WK League was the 18th season of the WK League, the top division of women's football in South Korea. Each of the eight teams played every other side four times, twice at home and twice away, totalling 28 matches per club in the regular season. The regular season began on 4 April 2026. After the regular season, the second and third-placed teams contested a one-legged playoff match, with the winner facing the top-ranked side in a two-legged final.

Hwacheon KSPO were the defending champions after beating Seoul City in the 2025 championship final.

Suwon FC finished top of the regular season table. However, they were defeated 1–0 on aggregate by Gyeongju KHNP in the championship final, with Gyeongju claiming their first WK League championship in their history.

== Teams ==
=== Stadiums and locations ===
Locations of the 2026 WK League teams

The following eight teams competed in the 2026 WK League. Changnyeong WFC was rebranded as Gangjin Swans WFC and relocated to Gangjin County, Jeonnam-Gwangju, starting with the 2026 season.

Team	Location	Stadium	Capacity	Position in 2025
Gangjin Swans	Gangjin	Gangjin Yeongrang Stadium		8th (as Changnyeong WFC)
Gyeongju KHNP	Gyeongju	Gyeongju Football Park Pitch 3	650	4th
Hwacheon KSPO	Hwacheon	Hwacheon Sports Park	2,000	1st
Incheon Hyundai Steel Red Angels	Incheon	Incheon Namdong Asiad	4,968	3rd
Mungyeong Sangmu	Mungyeong	Mungyeong Civic Stadium	4,959	6th
Sejong Sportstoto	Sejong	Sejong Civic Stadium		5th
Seoul City	Seoul	Seoul World Cup Stadium Auxiliary Field	1,012	2nd
Suwon FC	Suwon	Suwon Sports Complex	11,808	7th

=== Managerial changes ===
Team	Outgoing manager	Manner of departure	Date of vacancy	Replaced by	Date of appointment
Gyeongju KHNP	(South Korea) Song Ju-hee	Mutual consent	28 October 2025	(South Korea) Park Nam-yeol	2 December 2025
Gangjin Swans	(South Korea) Ahn Tae-hwan			(South Korea) Kwon Young-in	
Gangjin Swans	(South Korea) Kwon Young-in	Resigned	February 2026	(South Korea) Go Hyun-ho	25 February 2026

== Players ==
=== Foreign players ===
Each team was allowed to sign a total of three foreign players. As a military team, Mungyeong Sangmu can not recruit any foreign players.

Club	Player 1	Player 2	Player 3
Gangjin Swans	(Brazil) Manu Polachini		
Gyeongju KHNP	(Japan) Mai Kyokawa	(Japan) Emi Nakajima	(United States) Rebekah Valdez
Hwacheon KSPO	(Japan) Asuna Tanaka	(Japan) Sae Kitakata	
Incheon Hyundai Steel Red Angels	(Japan) Yuka Toriumi	(England) Fiona Worts	
Sejong Sportstoto			
Seoul City			
Suwon FC	(Japan) Ayaka Nishikawa	(Brazil) Mileninha	(Japan) Haruhi Suzuki

== Regular season ==
=== League table ===
Pos	Team	Pld	W	D	L	GF	GA	GD	Pts	Qualification
1	Suwon FC	28	20	2	6	61	24	+37	62	Qualification for Championship
2	Hwacheon KSPO	28	15	10	3	39	14	+25	55	Qualification for Playoff
3	Gyeongju KHNP	28	11	7	10	43	33	+10	40	Qualification for Playoff
4	Mungyeong Sangmu	28	12	3	13	30	34	−4	39	
5	Seoul City	28	11	4	13	25	38	−13	37	
6	Sejong Sportstoto	28	10	6	12	27	34	−7	36	
7	Incheon Red Angels	28	7	6	15	23	42	−19	27	
8	Gangjin Swans	28	4	6	18	23	52	−29	18	

Source: Soccerway

== Results ==
=== Matches 1–14 ===
Home \ Away	GAN	GYE	HWA	INC	MUN	SEJ	SEO	SUW
Gangjin Swans	—	2–3	0–2	1–3	1–2	0–0	1–2	1–6
Gyeongju KHNP	1–1	—	0–1	0–2	3–0	1–2	0–1	0–2
Hwacheon KSPO	2–0	2–0	—	1–1	0–1	2–0	1–0	1–2
Incheon Red Angels	3–2	1–0	0–1	—	0–1	0–1	1–0	2–1
Mungyeong Sangmu	1–0	1–1	1–3	1–1	—	1–2	3–0	1–3
Sejong Sportstoto	3–1	2–4	0–1	0–0	0–1	—	3–1	2–3
Seoul City	0–2	1–3	0–0	2–1	2–1	2–1	—	0–3
Suwon FC	1–2	1–2	1–0	4–0	2–0	6–0	2–1	—

Source: Soccerway
Legend: Blue = home team win; Yellow = draw; Red = away team win.

=== Matches 15–28 ===
Home \ Away	GAN	GYE	HWA	INC	MUN	SEJ	SEO	SUW
Gangjin Swans	—	1–1	1–1	1–1	0–1	0–1	0–1	2–0
Gyeongju KHNP	6–1	—	1–2	2–1	3–2	0–0	4–0	2–3
Hwacheon KSPO	5–1	1–1	—	3–0	2–0	1–1	0–0	2–0
Incheon Red Angels	1–0	1–1	0–2	—	1–2	0–1	0–2	0–1
Mungyeong Sangmu	0–1	1–0	1–1	4–1	—	0–1	2–1	0–1
Sejong Sportstoto	2–0	0–1	0–0	1–1	0–1	—	0–2	0–1
Seoul City	3–1	0–0	1–1	1–0	1–0	0–3	—	0–3
Suwon FC	0–0	1–3	0–0	4–0	3–1	4–1	2–1	—

Source: Soccerway
Legend: Blue = home team win; Yellow = draw; Red = away team win.

== Championship playoffs ==
Under WK League rules, a draw in the playoff was considered a win for the team with the higher regular-season ranking.

=== Bracket ===
Playoff (semi-final)			Championship (finals)
			1	Suwon FC	0	0	0
2	Hwacheon KSPO	1		Gyeongju KHNP	0	1	1
3	Gyeongju KHNP	2

=== Playoff ===
12 November 2026
19:00 UTC+9

Hwacheon KSPO	1–2	Gyeongju KHNP
Choi Yoo-jung 57'	Report	Moon Mi-ra 21'; Nakajima 48'

Hwacheon Sports Park, Hwacheon

=== Championship ===
15 November 2026
14:00 UTC+9

Gyeongju KHNP	0–0	Suwon FC
	Report

Gyeongju Civic Stadium, Gyeongju
18 November 2026
19:00 UTC+9

Suwon FC	0–1	Gyeongju KHNP
	Report	Nakajima 72'

Suwon Sports Complex, Suwon

Gyeongju KHNP won 1–0 on aggregate.

=== Final table ===
Pos	Team	Qualification
1	Gyeongju KHNP (C)	Qualification for Champions League
2	Suwon FC	
3	Hwacheon KSPO	

(C) Champions

== Statistics ==
=== Top scorers ===
Rank	Player	Club	Goals
1	(Japan) Haruhi Suzuki	Suwon FC	12
2	(South Korea) Choe Yu-ri	Suwon FC	10
2	(South Korea) Hyun Seul-gi	Gyeongju KHNP	10
4	(Japan) Mai Kyokawa	Gyeongju KHNP	9
5	(South Korea) Choi Yoo-jung	Hwacheon KSPO	8
5	(South Korea) Han Chae-rin	Seoul City	8
5	(South Korea) Kwon Hah-nul	Mungyeong Sangmu	8
8	(South Korea) Jeon Eun-ha	Gyeongju KHNP	7
8	(South Korea) Kang Tae-kyung	Seoul City	7
8	(South Korea) Lee Soo-bin	Hwacheon KSPO	7
8	(South Korea) Son Hwa-yeon	Gangjin Swans	7
8	(South Korea) Yoon Seo-jung	Suwon FC	7

==== Hat-tricks ====
Player	For	Against	Result	Date
(South Korea) Jang Yu-bin	Incheon Red Angels	Gangjin Swans	3–1 (A)	5 May 2026

=== Top assists ===
Rank	Player	Club	Assists
1	(South Korea) Ji So-yun	Suwon FC	9
2	(South Korea) Choi Yoo-jung	Hwacheon KSPO	7
3	(South Korea) Kim Seong-mi	Gangjin Swans	6
3	(Japan) Emi Nakajima	Gyeongju KHNP	6
5	(South Korea) Jang Sel-gi	Gyeongju KHNP	5
5	(South Korea) Yoon Su-jeong	Suwon FC	5
7	(South Korea) Han Da-in	Suwon FC	4
7	(South Korea) Hyun Seul-gi	Gyeongju KHNP	4
7	(South Korea) Jeon Eun-ha	Gyeongju KHNP	4
7	(South Korea) Kim Yun-ji	Gyeongju KHNP	4
7	(Japan) Ayaka Nishikawa	Suwon FC	4
7	(Japan) Haruhi Suzuki	Suwon FC	4
