= Jang Sel-gi =

South Korean footballer (born 1994)

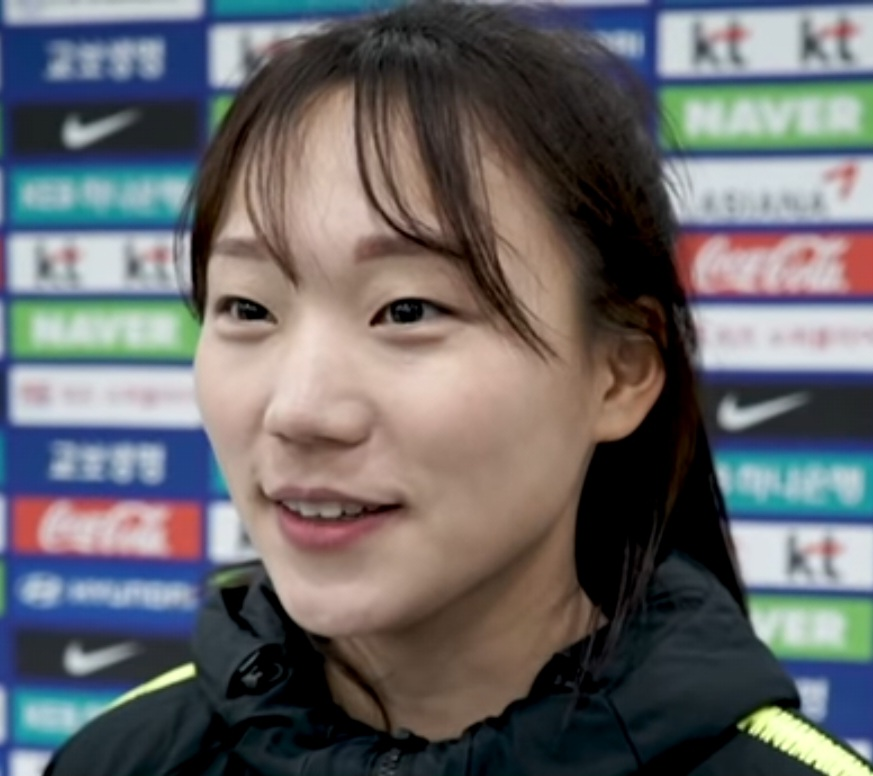
- Jang in 2019

Personal information
- Date of birth: 31 May 1994 (age 32)
- Place of birth: Incheon, South Korea
- Height: 1.62 m (5 ft 4 in)
- Positions: Defender; midfielder

Team information
- Current team: Gyeongju KHNP
- Number: 16

Youth career
- 2010–2011: Chungnam Internet High School
- 2012: Gangil Girl's High School

College career
Years	Team	Apps	(Gls)
2013–2014	Gangwon State University		

Senior career*
Years	Team	Apps	(Gls)
2015	INAC Kobe Leonessa	7	(0)
2016–2019	Incheon Hyundai Steel Red Angels	107	(44)
2020	Madrid CFF	6	(0)
2020–2023	Incheon Hyundai Steel Red Angels		
2024–	Gyeongju KHNP		

International career^{‡}
2009–2010	South Korea U17	12	(1)
2011–2014	South Korea U20	23	(12)
2013–2015	South Korea Universiade	12	(10)
2013–	South Korea	121	(19)
Medal record
Women's football
Representing South Korea
FIFA U-17 Women's World Cup
Winner	2010 Trinidad and Tobago
AFC Women's Asian Cup
Runner-up	2022 India
Asian Games
Bronze medal – third place	2018 Jakarta–Palembang
Bronze medal – third place	2026 Aichi–Nagoya
AFC U-19 Women's Championship
Winner	2013 China
AFC U-16 Women's Championship
Winner	2009 Thailand
EAFF Championship
Winner	2025 South Korea
Runner-up	2015 China
Runner-up	2019 South Korea
Bronze medal – third place	2022 Japan
Korean name
Hangul	장슬기
Hanja	張슬기
RR	Jang Seulgi
MR	Chang Sŭlgi
- * Club domestic league appearances and goals ‡ National team caps and goals as of 2 October 2026

Jang Sel-gi (Korean: 장슬기; born 31 May 1994) is a South Korean footballer who plays as a defender or midfielder for Gyeongju KHNP and the South Korea women's national team.

== Club career ==
=== INAC Kobe Leonessa ===
On 16 January 2015, Jang signed a one-year contract with Nadeshiko League club INAC Kobe Leonessa. After spending the first half of the season injured, she played her first league match as a 66th-minute substitute in a 1–0 home victory against Albirex Niigata on 5 September 2015. On 15 November 2015, she made her Empress's Cup debut in a 4–0 win over Bunnys Kyoto. She made a total of eight appearances for the club in all competitions.

=== Incheon Hyundai Steel Red Angels ===
On 21 January 2016, Jang joined WK League club Incheon Hyundai Steel Red Angels. On 14 March 2016, she made her WK League debut in a 2–1 win over Seoul WFC.

Jang scored 20 goals and made nine assists in 53 appearances across her first two seasons at Incheon, and won the league title in both seasons. On 25 November 2017, after scoring one goal and making one assist in a 2–2 draw between WK League All-Stars and her former club INAC Kobe Leonessa (followed by WK League's 4–2 penalty shoot-out win), she was named the Most Valuable Player of the match.

In 2018, Jang was selected as Women's Player of the Year by Korea Football Association after achieving her third consecutive title in addition to 11 goals and seven assists at the league.

At the 2019 WK League, where Jang won her fourth title, she provided the most assists with 17 assists as well as scoring 13 goals.

=== Madrid CFF ===
On 9 December 2019, Jang signed for Primera División club Madrid CFF, becoming the first South Korean female footballer to play for a Spanish club. On 7 May 2020, the Primera División competition was suspended due to the COVID-19 pandemic. With uncertainty over when the league would resume, Madrid CFF released players from their contracts and Jang returned to South Korea.

=== Return to Incheon ===
On 11 June 2020, Jang rejoined Incheon Hyundai Steel, signing a contract until the end of the 2022 season.

In 2021, Jang helped the club win the Korean Women's National Championship, and received the tournament's Most Valuable Player award.

In 2023, Jang left Incheon Hyundai Steel after the club reached their eleventh consecutive WK League title. Incheon lifted eight out of their eleven trophies with her.

=== Gyeongju KHNP ===
In 2024, Jang joined Gyeongju KHNP on a one-year contract, stating that she wanted a fresh start and "new energy" to avoid becoming complacent with repeatedly winning the championship. In her first year at another WK League club, she once again became the league's top assist provider, and received the best midfielder award. Having renewed her contract for another year, Gyeongju announced via their official Instagram page that Jang would be the club's captain for the 2025 season.

== International career ==
Jang was a member of the South Korea under-17 team at the 2009 AFC U-16 Women's Championship and the 2010 FIFA U-17 Women's World Cup, and won both competitions. She scored South Korea's last penalty in the penalty shoot-out of the U-17 World Cup final against Japan, which ended in a 5–4 win.

In 2013, Jang led the South Korea under-19 team to their second AFC U-19 Women's Championship title. She scored five goals in a 7–0 win over Myanmar and one goal in each of the three matches against China, North Korea and Australia, becoming the tournament's top scorer with eight goals. As a result of her performances, she received the AFC Women's Youth Player of the Year award as well as the tournament's Most Valuable Player award.

On 6 March 2013, Jang made her senior debut for South Korea in a 2–0 win against South Africa at the 2013 Cyprus Women's Cup. On 4 June 2016, she scored her first international goal in a 5–0 win against Myanmar.

== Career statistics ==
=== International ===
Scores and results list South Korea's goal tally first, score column indicates score after each Jang goal.

List of international goals scored by Jang Sel-gi
No.	Date	Venue	Opponent	Score	Result	Competition
1	4 June 2016	Thuwunna Stadium, Yangon, Myanmar	Myanmar	3–0	5–0	Friendly
2	7 June 2016	Thuwunna Stadium, Yangon, Myanmar	Myanmar	1–0	4–1	Friendly
3	7 June 2016	Thuwunna Stadium, Yangon, Myanmar	Myanmar	2–1	4–1	Friendly
4	8 November 2016	Hong Kong Football Club Stadium, Hong Kong	Guam	9–0	13–0	2017 EAFF E-1 Football Championship
5	11 November 2016	Hong Kong Football Club Stadium, Hong Kong	Hong Kong	13–0	14–0	2017 EAFF E-1 Football Championship
6	14 November 2016	Hong Kong Football Club Stadium, Hong Kong	Chinese Taipei	3–0	9–0	2017 EAFF E-1 Football Championship
7	7 April 2017	Kim Il-sung Stadium, Pyongyang, North Korea	North Korea	1–1	1–1	2018 AFC Women's Asian Cup qualification
8	9 April 2017	Kim Il-sung Stadium, Pyongyang, North Korea	Hong Kong	6–0	6–0	2018 AFC Women's Asian Cup qualification
9	16 April 2018	Amman International Stadium, Amman, Jordan	Philippines	1–0	5–0	2018 AFC Women's Asian Cup
10	16 August 2018	Gelora Sriwijaya Stadium, Palembang, Indonesia	Chinese Taipei	2–0	2–1	2018 Asian Games
11	21 August 2018	Gelora Sriwijaya Stadium, Palembang, Indonesia	Indonesia	8–0	12–0	2018 Asian Games
12	9 February 2020	Jeju World Cup Stadium, Seogwipo, South Korea	Vietnam	1–0	3–0	2020 AFC Women's Olympic Qualifying Tournament
13	8 July 2023	Seoul World Cup Stadium, Seoul, South Korea	Haiti	2–1	2–1	Friendly
14	5 April 2024	Icheon City Stadium, Icheon, South Korea	Philippines	3–0	3–0	Friendly
15	9 July 2025	Suwon World Cup Stadium, Suwon, South Korea	China	1–1	2–2	2025 EAFF E-1 Football Championship
16	16 July 2025	Suwon World Cup Stadium, Suwon, South Korea	Chinese Taipei	2–0	2–0	2025 EAFF E-1 Football Championship
17	14 March 2026	Stadium Australia, Sydney, Australia	Uzbekistan	6–0	6–0	2026 AFC Women's Asian Cup
18	9 June 2026	GFA National Training Center, Dededo, Guam	Chinese Taipei	4–3	5–3 (a.e.t.)	2028 EAFF E-1 Football Championship preliminary round
19	14 September 2026	Nagai Stadium, Osaka, Japan	Myanmar	3–0	5–0	2026 Asian Games

== Honours ==
Incheon Hyundai Steel Red Angels

- WK League: 2016, 2017, 2018, 2019, 2020, 2021, 2022, 2023
- Korean Women's National Championship: 2016, 2021

Gyeongju KHNP

- WK League: 2026
- Korean Women's National Championship runner-up: 2025

South Korea U17

- FIFA U-17 Women's World Cup: 2010
- AFC U-16 Women's Championship: 2009

South Korea U20

- AFC U-19 Women's Championship: 2013

South Korea

- EAFF Championship: 2025
- AFC Women's Asian Cup runner-up: 2022
- Asian Games bronze medal: 2018, 2026

Individual

- AFC U-19 Women's Championship Most Valuable Player: 2013
- AFC U-19 Women's Championship top goalscorer: 2013
- AFC Women's Youth Player of the Year: 2013
- EAFF Championship Best Defender: 2019
- EAFF Championship Most Valuable Player: 2025
- WK League All-Star Game Most Valuable Player: 2017
- WK League top assist provider: 2019, 2024
- WK League Best Midfielder: 2024
- WK League Best XI: 2025
- Korean FA Women's Player of the Year: 2018, 2020, 2025
- Korean Women's National Championship Most Valuable Player: 2021
