= Kim Min-ji (footballer) =

South Korean footballer (born 2003)

Personal information
- Date of birth: 21 August 2003 (age 23)
- Place of birth: Mapo-gu, Seoul, South Korea
- Height: 1.71 m (5 ft 7 in)
- Position: Midfielder

Team information
- Current team: Seoul City
- Number: 14

Youth career
- 2022-2023: Daeduk University

Senior career*
Years	Team	Apps	(Gls)
2024-	Seoul City		

International career^{‡}
2017-2019	South Korea U17	8	(0)
2022	South Korea U20	3	(0)
2025-	South Korea	5	(1)
Medal record
Women's football
Representing China
Asian Games
Bronze medal – third place	2026 Aichi–Nagoya	Team
- * Club domestic league appearances and goals ‡ National team caps and goals as of 07:38, 25 February 2026 (UTC)

Kim Min-ji (Korean: 김민지; born 21 August 2003) is a South Korean footballer who plays as a midfielder for WK League team Seoul City Amazones and the South Korea national team.

== Early life ==
Kim was born in Mapo-gu, Seoul. While attending Seogang Elementary School, she enjoyed running and often stayed behind on the sports field to watch the school's boys' football team train. The coach noticed her and suggested she try the sport, and as a result, she played for the boys' team up to the U-12 level.

== Youth career ==
Kim progressed to the U-15 girls' football academy at Oju Middle School, where she was known for her work ethic, undertaking weight training alone for up to two hours every night. Kim continued to play at Seoul Dongsan I.C.T. High School, then Daeduk University in Daejeon.

== Club career ==
Kim was selected by Seoul City manager Yoo Young-sil in the first round of the 2024 WK League new players draft, signing a three-year contract with the club. She was unable to play for much of the 2024 WK League season after sustaining an anterior cruciate ligament injury that required surgery; she played the 2025 season with a pin still in place in her right knee. In 2025, Kim recorded eight goals and three assists across 26 league games and was named in the WK League Best XI at the 2025 KWFF Awards. She was also presented with the Best Young Player award at the 2025 KFA Awards.

== International career ==
Kim represented South Korea at the 2017 EAFF U-15 Girls' Tournament and the 2018 FIFA U-17 Women's World Cup. She wore the captain's armband at the 2019 AFC U-16 Women's Championship. Team coaches named Kim as one of South Korea's key hopes ahead of the 2020 FIFA U-17 Women's World Cup, but the tournament was eventually cancelled due to the COVID-19 pandemic.

Kim received her first senior international call-up ahead of the 2025 EAFF E-1 Football Championship. She made her debut in July 2025, coming on as a substitute in the 23rd minute of South Korea's clash with China at the tournament, and was in the starting line-up for the team's second match, against Japan. Praising Kim's "hard work and fighting spirit", manager Shin Sang-woo said he believes Kim will play an important role as the South Korea women's team undergoes a generational shift.

Kim scored her first international goal in a friendly against Wales in November 2025.

== Style of play ==
As a youth player Kim played primarily as a defender, but also occasionally played as a midfielder or centre forward, and even briefly as a goalkeeper. She began playing as a midfielder after joining Seoul City at the suggestion of manager Yoo Young-sil.

Kim is known for her versatility, stamina, and dedication to training and self-management off the field. She credits her early years playing for a boys' team as helping her develop physicality and confidence in duels. Kim has cited Jeon Eun-ha and Lee Geum-min as role models for their skill in taking risks to break through opposition lines and create attacking opportunities.

== Career statistics ==
=== International ===
As of match played 3 December 2025

Appearances and goals by national team and year
National team	Year	Apps	Goals
South Korea	2025	5	1
Total		5	1

Scores and results list South Korea's goal tally first, score column indicates score after each Kim goal.

List of international goals scored by Kim Min-ji
No.	Date	Venue	Opponent	Score	Result	Competition
1	29 November 2025	Ciudad Deportiva Fundación, Málaga, Spain	Wales	1–1	1–1	Friendly
2	14 September 2026	Nagai Stadium, Osaka, Japan	Myanmar	1–0	5–0	2026 Asian Games
3	14 September 2026	Nagai Stadium, Osaka, Japan	Myanmar	2–0	5–0	2026 Asian Games
4	14 September 2026	Nagai Stadium, Osaka, Japan	Myanmar	4–0	5–0	2026 Asian Games
5	17 September 2026	Nagai Stadium, Osaka, Japan	Bangladesh	1–0	6–0	2026 Asian Games
6	25 September 2026	Nagai Stadium, Osaka, Japan	Uzbekistan	6–3	6–3	2026 Asian Games

== Honours ==
Daeduk University

- National Sports Festival: 2022
- Queen's Cup runner-up: 2022, 2023

Seoul City Amazones

- National Sports Festival runner-up: 2024
- WK League runner-up: 2025

South Korea

- EAFF E-1 Football Championship: 2025

Individual

- Queen's Cup Best Defender: 2023
- KWFF WK League Best XI: 2025
- KFA Young Player Award: 2025
