= Park Hye-jeong (footballer) =

South Korean football player

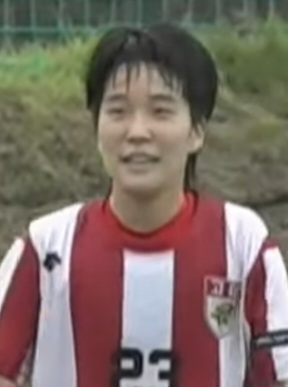
- Park playing for Korea University in 2021

Personal information
- Date of birth: March 30, 2000 (age 26)
- Height: 1.65 m (5 ft 5 in)
- Position: Midfielder

Team information
- Current team: Incheon Hyundai
- Number: 7

Youth career
- 2011-2012: Shinha Elementary School
- 2013-2015: Seolbong Middle School
- 2016-2018: Osan Girls I.C.T. High School
- 2019-2022: Korea University

Senior career*
Years	Team	Apps	(Gls)
2023-2025	Sejong Sportstoto	46	(4)
2026-	Incheon Hyundai	0	(0)

International career^{‡}
2013-2014	South Korea U-14	13	(10)
2014-2015	South Korea U-17	7	(1)
2018-2020	South Korea U-20	10	(2)
2023-	South Korea	3	(0)
- * Club domestic league appearances and goals as of 05:38, 23 April 2026 (UTC) ‡ National team caps and goals as of 05:10, 23 April 2026 (UTC)

Park Hye-jeong (Korean: 박혜정, born 30 March 2000) is a South Korean professional footballer who plays for WK League side Incheon Hyundai Steel Red Angels and the South Korea women's national team.

== Youth career ==
As a member of the U-12 side at Shinha Elementary School in Icheon, Park won five national championship titles in 2011. The following year, the side won the Unification Cup, and Park was named tournament MVP. Following a strong performance at the 2012 Queen's Cup, a newspaper report referred to her as the "female Park Ji-sung," and after Park Ji-sung himself read the report, Park Hye-jeong became the first recipient of a Park Ji-sung scholarship.

== Club career ==
Park was selected by Sejong Sportstoto in the first round of the 2023 WK League new players draft. She transferred to Incheon Hyundai Steel Red Angels ahead of the 2026 season.

== International career ==
Despite her small physique, Park demonstrated speed and goalscoring ability for South Korea at U-14 level and her footballing intelligence was widely considered to be outstanding for that age group. She was named tournament MVP at the 2014 AFC U-14 Women's Championship, at which South Korea finished in third.

In November 2019, Park received her first senior national team call-up when she was included in the 24-strong roster for the final training camp ahead of the EAFF E-1 Football Championship, but she had to withdraw from the squad due to college class requirements. She was included in the squad for the qualifying tournament for the 2020 Tokyo Olympics, replacing an injured Cho So-hyun. She made her A match debut in 2023 when she was called up for a friendly match against Zambia.

Park played for South Korea at the 2026 AFC Women's Asian Cup.

== Honours ==
=== Individual ===
- AFC U-14 Women's Championship MVP: 2014
