= 2014 WK League =

WK League
- Season: 2014
- Dates: 17 March – 18 August 2014
- Champions: Incheon Hyundai Steel Red Angels (2nd title)
- Matches: 84
- Goals: 212 (2.52 per match)
- Top goalscorer: Park Hee-young (11 goals)
- Biggest home win: Incheon 5–0 Busan
- Biggest away win: Daejeon 0–5 Incheon
- (Note: All statistics do not include play-off matches)

The 2014 WK League was the sixth season of the WK League, the top division of women's football in South Korea. The regular season began on 17 March 2014 and ended on 18 August 2014. Defending champions Incheon Hyundai Steel Red Angels successfully defended their title by defeating Goyang Daekyo Noonnoppi 1–0 on aggregate in the two-legged final.

== Teams ==
=== Stadiums and locations ===
Locations of the 2014 WK League teams

Team	City/Province	Stadium	Capacity	Position in 2013
Busan Sangmu	Busan	Unknown	Unknown	7th place
Daejeon Sportstoto	Daejeon	Unknown	Unknown	5th place
Goyang Daekyo Noonnoppi	Goyang	Unknown	Unknown	3rd place
Incheon Hyundai Steel Red Angels	Incheon	Incheon Namdong Asiad Rugby Field	5,078	Champions
Jeonbuk KSPO	Jeonbuk	Unknown	Unknown	4th place
Seoul WFC	Seoul	Hyochang Stadium	15,194	Runners-up
Suwon FMC	Suwon	Suwon Sports Complex	11,808	6th place

=== Draft ===
The 2014 WK League Draft was held on 17 December 2013 at the Koreana Hotel in Seoul.

Team	Pick	First round	Third round	Fifth round	Seventh round
Busan Sangmu	1st	Lee Jung-eun	Kim Na-ri	Jeon Da-eun	Pass
Suwon FMC	2nd	Shin Dam-yeong	Pass	Kim Deok-yu	Pass
Daejeon Sportstoto	3rd	Yeo Min-ji	Yoon Da-gyeong	Pass	Pass
Jeonbuk KSPO	4th	Oh Da-hye	Pass	Oh Eun-ah	Pass
Goyang Daekyo Noonnoppi	5th	Lee Yoo-na	Pass	Pass	Pass
Seoul WFC	6th	Shin Seon-ae	No So-mi	Song Bo-ram	Kim Mi-sook
Incheon Hyundai Steel Red Angels	7th	Baek Eun-mi	Pass	Pass	Pass
Team	Pick	Second round	Fourth round	Sixth round	—
Incheon Hyundai Steel Red Angels	1st	Shin Hye-sun	Pass	Pass	—
Seoul WFC	2nd	Seo Hye-bin	Pass	Pass	—
Goyang Daekyo Noonnoppi	3rd	Kim Bich-na	Pass	Pass	—
Jeonbuk KSPO	4th	Kim Da-hye	Pass	Pass	—
Daejeon Sportstoto	5th	Joo Soo-jin	Pass	Pass	—
Suwon FMC	6th	Choi So-jung	Pass	Kim Su-min	—
Busan Sangmu	7th	Pass	Pass	Kim Ji-won	—

== Regular season ==
=== League table ===
Pos	Team	Pld	W	D	L	GF	GA	GD	Pts	Qualification
1	Incheon Hyundai Steel Red Angels (C)	24	16	5	3	49	14	+35	53	Qualification for playoffs final
2	Goyang Daekyo Noonnoppi	24	12	10	2	34	20	+14	46	Qualification for playoffs semi-final
3	Seoul WFC	24	10	6	8	28	29	−1	36	Qualification for playoffs semi-final
4	Daejeon Sportstoto	24	8	8	8	32	30	+2	32	
5	Suwon FMC	24	8	5	11	20	31	−11	29	
6	Busan Sangmu	24	4	6	14	23	45	−22	18	
7	Jeonbuk KSPO	24	4	4	16	26	43	−17	16	

Source: KWFF
Rules for classification: 1) Points; 2) Goal difference; 3) Goals scored
(C) Champions

=== Results ===
==== Matches 1–12 ====
Home \ Away	BS	DS	GDN	INC	JEO	SC	SUW
Busan Sangmu	—	1–2	2–3	0–2	2–1	1–2	1–0
Daejeon Sportstoto	2–1	—	0–0	1–1	0–1	3–1	1–1
Goyang Daekyo Noonnoppi	1–1	4–0	—	0–0	4–0	0–0	0–0
Incheon Hyundai Steel Red Angels	5–0	1–0	5–1	—	3–0	2–1	0–1
Jeonbuk KSPO	3–1	1–1	2–3	0–1	—	3–4	0–1
Seoul WFC	1–2	2–2	1–1	2–1	3–2	—	1–2
Suwon FMC	1–1	1–0	1–1	0–2	1–0	0–3	—

Source: Soccerway
Legend: Blue = home team win; Yellow = draw; Red = away team win.

==== Matches 13–24 ====
Home \ Away	BS	DS	GDN	INC	JEO	SC	SUW
Busan Sangmu	—	0–0	0–3	3–3	0–0	0–1	1–4
Daejeon Sportstoto	5–3	—	1–1	0–5	3–2	2–0	1–2
Goyang Daekyo Noonnoppi	1–0	0–0	—	0–4	1–0	1–0	1–0
Incheon Hyundai Steel Red Angels	4–0	2–0	1–3	—	3–0	0–0	1–1
Jeonbuk KSPO	1–2	0–4	1–1	0–1	—	2–3	3–1
Seoul WFC	0–0	1–0	0–2	0–3	0–0	—	2–0
Suwon FMC	2–0	0–4	1–2	0–1	0–4	0–1	—

Source: Soccerway
Legend: Blue = home team win; Yellow = draw; Red = away team win.

== Statistics ==
=== Top scorers ===
Rank	Player	Club	Goals
1	(South Korea) Park Hee-young	Daejeon Sportstoto	11
2	(South Korea) Park Eun-sun	Seoul WFC	9
2	(Brazil) Bia Zaneratto	Incheon Hyundai Steel Red Angels	9
2	(South Korea) Yoo Young-a	Incheon Hyundai Steel Red Angels	9
5	(Brazil) Pretinha	Goyang Daekyo Noonnoppi	8
6	(South Korea) Kwon Hah-nul	Busan Sangmu	7
7	(South Korea) Lee Hyeon-yeong	Goyang Daekyo Noonnoppi	6
7	(South Korea) Kim Sang-eun	Jeonbuk KSPO	6

=== Top assist providers ===
Rank	Player	Club	Assists
1	(Brazil) Thaís Guedes	Incheon Hyundai Steel Red Angels	10
2	(South Korea) Lee Se-eun	Incheon Hyundai Steel Red Angels	7
3	(South Korea) Park Sung-eun	Seoul WFC	6
3	(South Korea) Park Ji-young	Daejeon Sportstoto	6
5	(Brazil) Bia Zaneratto	Incheon Hyundai Steel Red Angels	5
6	(South Korea) Seo Hyun-sook	Goyang Daekyo Noonnoppi	4
6	(South Korea) Choi Yoo-jung	Suwon FMC	4
6	(South Korea) Lee Min-a	Incheon Hyundai Steel Red Angels	4

== Championship playoffs ==
The semi-final was contested between Goyang Daekyo Noonnoppi and Seoul WFC, the second and third placed teams in the regular season. After defeating Seoul WFC 1–0, Goyang Daekyo Noonnoppi advanced to the two-legged final to face regular season winners Incheon Hyundai Steel Red Angels. Goyang Daekyo lost 1–0 on aggregate to Incheon Hyundai Steel Red Angels, who won their second consecutive league title.

=== Bracket ===
Semi-final			Final
			1	Incheon Hyundai Steel Red Angels	1	0	1
2	Goyang Daekyo Noonnoppi	1		Goyang Daekyo Noonnoppi	0	0	0
3	Seoul WFC	0

=== Semi-final ===
6 October 2014
19:00

Goyang Daekyo Noonnoppi	1–0	Seoul WFC
Lee Hyun-young 76'

Goyang Stadium, Goyang

=== Final ===
13 October 2014
16:00

Goyang Daekyo Noonnoppi	0–1	Incheon Hyundai Steel Red Angels
		Jung Seol-bin 72'

Goyang Stadium, Goyang

20 October 2014
16:00

Incheon Hyundai Steel Red Angels	0–0	Goyang Daekyo Noonnoppi

Boeun Stadium, Boeun

Incheon Hyundai Steel Red Angels won 1–0 on aggregate.

== See also ==
- 2014 in South Korean football
