= Kim Myeong-jin =

South Korean footballer (born 2002)

Personal information
- Date of birth: December 20, 2002 (age 23)
- Place of birth: Gangwon Province
- Height: 1.60 m (5 ft 3 in)
- Position: Midfielder

Team information
- Current team: Incheon Hyundai Steel Red Angels
- Number: 21

Youth career
- -2014: Seongdeok Elementary School
- 2015-2017: Haseulla Middle School
- 2018-2020: Hwacheon Information Industrial High School
- 2021-2024: Korea University

Senior career*
Years	Team	Apps	(Gls)
2025-	Incheon Hyundai		

International career
- South Korea U-15
2022	South Korea U-20		
2025-	South Korea		
- * Club domestic league appearances and goals

Kim Myeong-jin (Korean: 김명진; born December 20, 2002) is a South Korean footballer who plays as a midfielder for WK League club Incheon Hyundai Steel Red Angels and the South Korea women's national team.

== Youth career ==
She began playing football while attending elementary school and gained attention for her natural ability and technical skills, being named as the most outstanding player in the elementary school category at the 2014 Unification National Women's Football Tournament. She was also the top goalscorer in the elementary school division at the 2014 Fall Korean Women's Football Championship, scoring eleven goals to help her team reach third place in the tournament. As a middle school student at Haseulla Middle School in Gangneung, she received a scholarship of 1 million won from the Korea Southeast Power Company to support her footballing career. She attended Hwacheon Information Industrial High School, scoring the first goal in the final of the 18th National Women's Football Tournament, which saw her team defeat Ulsan Technical College to lift the trophy in the high school division. She went on to play as a forward for Korea University and was named as the most outstanding university-level player nationwide at the 2024 KPFA WK League Awards.

== Club career ==
Kim was signed by Incheon Hyundai Steel Red Angels as the overall first pick at the 2025 WK League draft. She made her league debut on 15 March 2025, coming on as a substitute at half time in Incheon's opening match against Mungyeong Sangmu. In her second appearance for the club a week later, she scored the winning goal against Bam Khatoon F.C. in the quarter finals of the AFC Women's Champions League.

== International career ==
Kim played for South Korea's U-15 national team while at middle school. As a high schooler she was called up to train with the national U-20 squad in preparation for the 2020 FIFA U-20 Women's World Cup. She was part of South Korea's squad for the 2022 FIFA U-20 Women's World Cup in Costa Rica and Panama. Kim received her first senior call-up in 2025, travelling to the United Arab Emirates to participate in the Pink Ladies Cup.
