= 2013 WK League =

WK League
- Season: 2013
- Dates: 18 March – 7 October 2013
- Champions: Incheon Hyundai Steel Red Angels (1st title)
- Matches: 84
- Goals: 207 (2.46 per match)
- Top goalscorer: Park Eun-sun (19 goals)
- Biggest home win: Goyang 4–0 Suwon; Incheon 4–0 Suwon
- Biggest away win: Jeonbuk 0–4 Incheon
- (Note: All statistics do not include play-off matches)

The 2013 WK League was the fifth season of the WK League, the top division of women's football in South Korea. The regular season began on 18 March 2013 and ended on 7 October 2013.

Chungnam Ilhwa Chunma withdrew from the league due to their dissolution before the season. Defending champions Goyang Daekyo Noonnoppi lost the title to Incheon Hyundai Steel Red Angels 2–4 on aggregate in the two-legged final.

== Teams ==
Locations of the 2013 WK League teams

Team	City/Province	Stadium	Capacity	Position in 2012
Busan Sangmu	Busan	Unknown	Unknown	8th place
Chungbuk Sportstoto	Chungbuk	Unknown	Unknown	4th place
Goyang Daekyo Noonnoppi	Goyang	Unknown	Unknown	Champions
Incheon Hyundai Steel Red Angels	Incheon	Incheon Namdong Asiad Rugby Field	5,078	Runners-up
Jeonbuk KSPO	Jeonbuk	Unknown	Unknown	3rd place
Seoul WFC	Seoul	Hyochang Stadium	15,194	5th place
Suwon FMC	Suwon	Suwon Sports Complex	11,808	6th place

== Regular season ==
=== League table ===
Pos	Team	Pld	W	D	L	GF	GA	GD	Pts	Qualification
1	Incheon Hyundai Steel Red Angels (C)	24	15	5	4	44	15	+29	50	Qualification for playoffs final
2	Seoul WFC	24	11	7	6	34	26	+8	40	Qualification for playoffs semi-final
3	Goyang Daekyo Noonnoppi	24	10	9	5	31	20	+11	39	Qualification for playoffs semi-final
4	Jeonbuk KSPO	24	8	6	10	28	38	−10	30	
5	Chungbuk Sportstoto	24	7	8	9	27	34	−7	29	
6	Suwon FMC	24	7	6	11	28	38	−10	27	
7	Busan Sangmu	24	2	7	15	22	43	−21	13	

Source: KWFF
Rules for classification: 1) Points; 2) Goal difference; 3) Goals scored
(C) Champions

=== Results ===
==== Matches 1–12 ====
Home \ Away	BS	CBS	GDN	INC	JEO	SC	SUW
Busan Sangmu	—	1–1	1–3	0–2	0–0	1–1	1–2
Chungbuk Sportstoto	1–0	—	1–1	0–2	1–3	1–2	3–1
Goyang Daekyo Noonnoppi	3–1	1–2	—	3–1	0–0	1–1	2–0
Incheon Hyundai Steel Red Angels	2–0	2–0	2–0	—	1–1	0–0	2–0
Jeonbuk KSPO	3–2	1–0	2–2	0–4	—	1–4	0–1
Seoul WFC	2–1	1–4	2–0	2–1	2–1	—	2–1
Suwon FMC	2–2	2–2	0–1	0–1	4–1	2–1	—

Source: Soccerway
Legend: Blue = home team win; Yellow = draw; Red = away team win.

==== Matches 13–24 ====
Home \ Away	BS	CBS	GDN	INC	JEO	SC	SUW
Busan Sangmu	—	1–2	0–1	0–2	1–2	0–3	2–1
Chungbuk Sportstoto	2–2	—	1–1	0–2	1–2	4–1	1–1
Goyang Daekyo Noonnoppi	2–0	0–0	—	1–0	1–1	1–1	4–0
Incheon Hyundai Steel Red Angels	1–1	3–0	2–1	—	3–2	1–2	4–0
Jeonbuk KSPO	2–1	1–2	1–0	0–4	—	0–1	2–2
Seoul WFC	0–1	0–0	1–1	1–1	0–2	—	1–2
Suwon FMC	3–3	0–1	0–1	1–1	1–0	2–0	—

Source: Soccerway
Legend: Blue = home team win; Yellow = draw; Red = away team win.

== Championship playoffs ==
=== Bracket ===
Semi-final			Final
			1	Incheon Hyundai Steel Red Angels	1	3	4
2	Seoul WFC	3		Seoul WFC	1	1	2
3	Goyang Daekyo Noonnoppi	2

=== Semi-final ===
30 September 2013

Seoul WFC	3–2	Goyang Daekyo Noonnoppi

Boeun Public Stadium, Boeun

=== Final ===
7 October 2013

Seoul WFC	1–1	Incheon Hyundai Steel Red Angels

Boeun Public Stadium, Boeun

14 October 2013

Incheon Hyundai Steel Red Angels	3–1	Seoul WFC

Seoul World Cup Stadium, Seoul

Incheon Hyundai Steel Red Angels won 4–2 on aggregate.

== See also ==
- 2013 in South Korean football
