= Choi Yoo-jung (footballer) =

South Korean footballer (born 1992)

Personal information
- Date of birth: 25 January 1992 (age 34)
- Height: 1.70 m (5 ft 7 in)
- Positions: Winger; striker

Team information
- Current team: Hwacheon KSPO WFC
- Number: 10

Youth career
- 2010-2011: Ulsan College

Senior career*
Years	Team	Apps	(Gls)
2012-2014	Suwon FMC		
2015	Daejeon Sportstoto		
2016-2018	Seoul City		
2019-2023	Incheon Hyundai		
2024-	Hwacheon KSPO		

International career^{‡}
2011	South Korea Universiade	6	(2)
2011-2012	South Korea U-20	7	(1)
2024-	South Korea	8	(1)
- * Club domestic league appearances and goals ‡ National team caps and goals as of 04:54, 15 April 2026 (UTC)

Choi Yoo-jung (Korean: 최유정; born 25 January 1992) is a South Korean professional footballer who plays as a winger or striker for WK League club Hwacheon KSPO and the South Korea national team.

== Club career ==
=== Early years (2012–2018) ===
After graduating from Ulsan College, Choi made her WK League debut in 2012 with Suwon FMC and soon became known for her goalscoring ability. In 2014, Choi scored for Suwon in the final of the National Women's Football Championship, but the team ultimately lost 2–4 to Seoul City to finish as runners-up.

In 2015, Choi joined Daejeon Sportstoto, making her debut for the club in the opening match of the WK League season against Seoul City. The following year, she transferred to Seoul, where she maintained her reputation as one of the league's top goalscorers.

=== Incheon Hyundai Steel Red Angels (2019–2023) ===
Following the expiration of her contract with Seoul City, in 2019, Choi transferred to Incheon Hyundai Steel Red Angels, joining the club as it aimed to win an eighth consecutive WK League title. After settling into the team, Choi continued to demonstrate her creative abilities. In 2020, she scored a hat-trick in Incheon's 5–0 win against Hwacheon KSPO, and by the following year, she had established herself as a crucial member of the team's attacking line, recording nine goals and six assists in the first 15 matches of the 2021 WK League season, including a hat-trick against Changnyeong WFC in the second round.

Choi had a strong start to the 2023 WK League season, scoring two goals in Incheon's opening match against Mungyeong Sangmu and receiving the Player of the Match award.

=== Hwacheon KSPO (2024-) ===
Choi joined Hwacheon KSPO in 2024 and was a key player in that year's WK League campaign, scoring nine goals and providing five assists during the regular league season, which saw Hwacheon finish in first place. In 2025, she scored the winning goal in the final of the National Women's Football Championship and received the tournament's top goalscorer award. She was the top assist provider in the 2025 WK League, recording 13 assists during the regular season in addition to scoring 12 goals. She scored twice and provided one assist in the second leg of the championship final to help Hwacheon achieve their first WK League Championship title and complete the first domestic treble in the history of South Korean women's football. She was named in the 2025 WK League Best XI at the 2025 KWFF Awards.

== International career ==
Choi received her first senior call-up for South Korea in 2024. She scored her first international goal in a match against India at the 2025 Pink Ladies Cup. Choi made her major tournament debut at the 2026 AFC Women's Asian Cup, appearing in South Korea's opening match against Iran.

== Career statistics ==
=== International ===
As of match played 2 March 2026

Appearances and goals by national team and year
National team	Year	Apps	Goals
South Korea	2024	2	0
South Korea	2025	5	1
South Korea	2026	1	0
Total		9	1

Scores and results list South Korea's goal tally first, score column indicates score after each Choi Yoo-jung goal.

List of international goals scored by Choi Yoo-jung
No.	Date	Venue	Opponent	Score	Result	Competition	Ref.
1	26 February 2025	Al Hamriya Sports Club Stadium, Al Hamriyah, United Arab Emirates	India	1–0	3-0	2025 Pink Ladies Cup	

== Honours ==
=== Suwon FMC ===
- National Women's Football Championship
  - Runners-up: 2014
  - Third place: 2013

=== Incheon Hyundai Steel Red Angels ===
- WK League
  - Champions: 2019, 2020, 2021, 2022, 2023

=== Hwacheon KSPO ===
- WK League
  - Champions: 2025
  - Runners-up: 2024
- National Women's Football Championship
  - Champions: 2025
- National Sports Festival
  - Champions: 2025

=== Individual ===
- National Women's Football Championship top goalscorer: 2025
- WK League championship final MVP: 2025
- WK League top assist provider: 2025
- WK League Best XI: 2025
