= 2012 WK-League =

WK League
- Season: 2012
- Dates: 26 March – 29 October 2012
- Champions: Goyang Daekyo Noonnoppi (3rd title)
- Matches: 84
- Goals: 254 (3.02 per match)
- Top goalscorer: Pretinha (18 goals)
- Biggest home win: Incheon 5–1 Busan; Incheon 5–1 Suwon
- Biggest away win: Chungbuk 0–4 Goyang; Jeonbuk 0–4 Seoul
- (Note: All statistics do not include play-off matches)

The 2012 WK League was the fourth season of the WK League, the top division of women's football in South Korea. The regular season began on 26 March 2012 and ended on 29 October 2012. Defending champions Goyang Daekyo Noonnoppi successfully defended their title, winning the two-legged final 3–2 on aggregate.

== Teams ==
Locations of the 2012 WK League teams

Team	City/Province	Stadium	Capacity	Position in 2011
Busan Sangmu	Busan	Unknown	Unknown	4th place
Chungbuk Sportstoto	Chungbuk	Unknown	Unknown	8th place
Chungnam Ilhwa Chunma	Chungnam	Unknown	Unknown	5th place
Goyang Daekyo Noonnoppi	Goyang	Goyang Stadium	41,311	Champions
Incheon Hyundai Steel Red Angels	Incheon	Incheon Namdong Asiad Rugby Field	5,078	Runners-up
Jeonbuk KSPO	Jeonbuk	Unknown	Unknown	7th place
Seoul City Amazones	Seoul	Hyochang Stadium	15,194	6th place
Suwon FMC	Suwon	Suwon Sports Complex	11,808	3rd place

== Regular season ==
=== League table ===
Pos	Team	Pld	W	D	L	GF	GA	GD	Pts	Qualification
1	Goyang Daekyo Noonnoppi (C)	21	17	2	2	54	11	+43	53	Qualification for playoffs final
2	Incheon Hyundai Steel Red Angels	21	16	2	3	43	17	+26	50	Qualification for playoffs semi-final
3	Jeonbuk KSPO	21	10	2	9	30	32	−2	32	Qualification for playoffs semi-final
4	Chungbuk Sportstoto	21	7	5	9	31	43	−12	26	
5	Seoul City Amazones	21	5	9	7	26	29	−3	24	
6	Suwon FMC	21	6	6	9	29	39	−10	24	
7	Chungnam Ilhwa Chunma	21	3	6	12	16	30	−14	15	
8	Busan Sangmu	21	2	4	15	25	53	−28	10	

Source: WK League
Rules for classification: 1) Points; 2) Goal difference; 3) Goals scored
(C) Champions

=== Results ===
==== Matches 1–14 ====
Home \ Away	BS	CBS	CIC	GDN	INC	JEO	SC	SUW
Busan Sangmu	—	2–1	3–4	1–4	0–1	2–3	1–4	3–2
Chungbuk Sportstoto	4–2	—	1–0	0–4	0–1	1–3	2–1	3–3
Chungnam Ilhwa Chunma	1–1	1–3	—	1–1	0–1	0–1	0–0	1–1
Goyang Daekyo Noonnoppi	2–0	4–0	2–0	—	1–0	3–0	0–2	2–0
Incheon Hyundai Steel Red Angels	3–1	3–2	1–0	1–3	—	2–1	2–0	1–0
Jeonbuk KSPO	4–1	3–0	3–1	1–1	2–1	—	1–2	1–2
Seoul City Amazones	1–1	3–1	0–2	2–4	1–3	2–0	—	1–1
Suwon FMC	2–0	1–1	2–3	0–1	2–3	1–0	2–2	—

Source: Soccerway
Legend: Blue = home team win; Yellow = draw; Red = away team win.

==== Matches 15–21 ====
Home \ Away	BS	CBS	CIC	GDN	INC	JEO	SC	SUW
Busan Sangmu	—	1–2		0–3		1–2		2–3
Chungbuk Sportstoto		—	1–1		1–1		2–2	2–2
Chungnam Ilhwa Chunma	1–1		—	0–2	0–3		0–0	
Goyang Daekyo Noonnoppi		5–1		—	0–1		3–0	5–1
Incheon Hyundai Steel Red Angels	5–1				—			5–1
Jeonbuk KSPO		0–2	1–0	0–4		—	0–4	
Seoul City Amazones	1–1					1–1	—	0–1
Suwon FMC			1–0			1–3		—

Source: Soccerway
Legend: Blue = home team win; Yellow = draw; Red = away team win.

== All-Star Game ==
Chungnam Ilhwa Chunma, Goyang Daekyo Noonnoppi, Jeonbuk KSPO and Suwon Facilities Management Corporation players played for Blue Mir, while Busan Sangmu, Chungbuk Sportstoto, Incheon Hyundai Steel Red Angels and Seoul City Amazones players played for Red Mir.

4 June 2012
19:00 UTC+9

Blue Mir	5–4	Red Mir
Kwon Eun-som 8'; Park Hee-young 15', 25'; Karina 22'; Kwak Ji-hye 51'		Lee Ye-eun 17'; Kang Ga-ae 23' (o.g.); Park Eun-sun 47'; Kim Soo-yeon 80'

Boeun Stadium, Boeun
Attendance: 5,000
Referee: Hong Eun-ah

== Championship playoffs ==
=== Bracket ===
Semi-final			Final
			1	Goyang Daekyo Noonnoppi	0	3	3
2	Incheon Hyundai Steel Red Angels	3		Incheon Hyundai Steel Red Angels	1	1	2
3	Jeonbuk KSPO	2

=== Semi-final ===
24 September 2012
19:00 UTC+9

Incheon Hyundai Steel Red Angels	3–2	Jeonbuk KSPO
Lee Min-a 26'; Cho So-hyun 59'; Lim Sun-joo 85'		Choi Eun-ji 24'; Jang Jung-hee 81'

Hwacheon Stadium, Hwacheon
Attendance: 1,000
Referee: Lee Yong-woon

=== Final ===
22 October 2012
19:00 UTC+9

Incheon Hyundai Steel Red Angels	1–0	Goyang Daekyo Noonnoppi
Lee Ye-eun 51'

Boeun Stadium, Boeun

29 October 2012
19:00 UTC+9

Goyang Daekyo Noonnoppi	3–1	Incheon Hyundai Steel Red Angels
Choi Woong-bi 14'; Cha Yun-hee 75', 79'		Jeon Ga-eul 90+1'

Goyang Stadium, Goyang

Goyang Daekyo Noonnoppi won 3–2 on aggregate.

== See also ==
- 2012 in South Korean football
