= 2015 WK League =

WK League
- Season: 2015
- Dates: 16 March – 5 October 2015
- Champions: Incheon Hyundai Steel Red Angels (3rd title)
- Matches: 84
- Goals: 250 (2.98 per match)
- Top goalscorer: Laura Rus (17 goals)
- Biggest home win: Incheon 5–0 Seoul (twice); Icheon 5–0 Busan; Icheon 5–0 Seoul
- Biggest away win: Busan 0–4 Incheon
- (Note: All statistics do not include play-off matches)

The 2015 WK League was the seventh season of the WK League, the top division of women's football in South Korea. The regular season began on 16 March 2015 and ended on 5 October 2015. Incheon Hyundai Steel Red Angels successfully defended their title to claim their third consecutive championship.

== Changes from 2014 ==
Goyang Daekyo Noonnoppi and Jeonbuk KSPO relocated to Icheon and Hwacheon and were renamed Icheon Daekyo and Hwacheon KSPO, respectively. For the first time, the WK League introduced a home and away system, with the hope that teams could build stronger connections with regional governments and fans.

== Teams ==
Locations of the 2015 WK League teams

Team	City	Stadium	Capacity	Position in 2014
Busan Sangmu	Busan	Boeun Public Stadium (Note: Busan Sangmu played their WK League matches in Boeun, but decided to be named Busan to represent the city in the Korean National Sports Festival.)	6,000	6th place
Daejeon Sportstoto	Daejeon	Daejeon Hanbat Sports Complex	26,000	4th place
Hwacheon KSPO	Hwacheon	Hwacheon Sports Park	3,000	7th place
Icheon Daekyo	Icheon	Icheon City Stadium	20,305	Runners-up
Incheon Hyundai Steel Red Angels	Incheon	Incheon Namdong Asiad Rugby Field	5,078	Champions
Seoul WFC	Seoul	Hyochang Stadium	15,194	3rd place
Suwon FMC	Suwon	Suwon Sports Complex	11,808	5th place

== Regular season ==
=== League table ===
Pos	Team	Pld	W	D	L	GF	GA	GD	Pts	Qualification
1	Incheon Hyundai Steel Red Angels (C)	24	19	4	1	57	16	+41	61	Qualification for playoffs final
2	Icheon Daekyo	24	12	7	5	43	23	+20	43	Qualification for playoffs semi-final
3	Suwon FMC	24	10	7	7	36	30	+6	37	Qualification for playoffs semi-final
4	Hwacheon KSPO	24	8	10	6	34	28	+6	34	
5	Daejeon Sportstoto	24	8	6	10	30	26	+4	30	
6	Seoul WFC	24	3	6	15	28	61	−33	15	
7	Busan Sangmu	24	3	2	19	22	66	−44	11	

Source: RSSSF
(C) Champions

=== Results ===
==== Matches 1–12 ====
Home \ Away	BUS	DJS	HWA	ICH	INC	SEO	SUW
Busan Sangmu	—	1–2	1–2	0–1	0–4	1–4	1–5
Daejeon Sportstoto	3–1	—	2–0	1–1	2–2	1–1	0–1
Hwacheon KSPO	2–0	0–0	—	1–1	0–1	2–1	1–1
Icheon Daekyo	5–0	0–1	1–1	—	0–0	3–2	1–2
Incheon Hyundai Steel Red Angels	4–0	2–0	1–1	2–1	—	5–0	3–1
Seoul WFC	0–2	0–2	3–3	0–1	1–2	—	1–4
Suwon FMC	1–0	2–1	2–1	0–0	3–4	2–2	—

Source: Soccerway
Legend: Blue = home team win; Yellow = draw; Red = away team win.

==== Matches 13–24 ====
Home \ Away	BUS	DJS	HWA	ICH	INC	SEO	SUW
Busan Sangmu	—	3–2	2–2	0–3	1–3	2–2	0–1
Daejeon Sportstoto	1–0	—	0–1	2–2	0–2	1–2	4–0
Hwacheon KSPO	5–2	2–1	—	1–1	0–2	0–0	0–0
Icheon Daekyo	4–0	1–0	1–4	—	3–1	5–0	2–1
Incheon Hyundai Steel Red Angels	4–1	1–0	3–0	1–0	—	5–0	1–1
Seoul WFC	2–4	1–4	1–5	1–2	1–3	—	2–1
Suwon FMC	4–0	0–0	1–0	2–4	0–1	1–1	—

Source: Soccerway
Legend: Blue = home team win; Yellow = draw; Red = away team win.

== Championship playoffs ==
=== Bracket ===
Semi-final			Final
			1	Incheon Hyundai Steel Red Angels (p)	0	1	1 (4)
2	Icheon Daekyo	2		Icheon Daekyo	0	1	1 (3)
3	Suwon FMC	1

=== Semi-final ===
26 October 2015

Icheon Daekyo	2–1	Suwon FMC

Icheon City Stadium, Icheon

=== Final ===
2 November 2015

Icheon Daekyo	0–0	Incheon Hyundai Steel Red Angels

Icheon City Stadium, Icheon

9 November 2015

Incheon Hyundai Steel Red Angels	1–1	Icheon Daekyo
Penalties
	4–3

Incheon Asiad Main Stadium, Incheon

1–1 on aggregate. Incheon Hyundai Steel Red Angels won 4–3 on penalties.
