= Ryu Ji-soo =

South Korean footballer (born 1997)

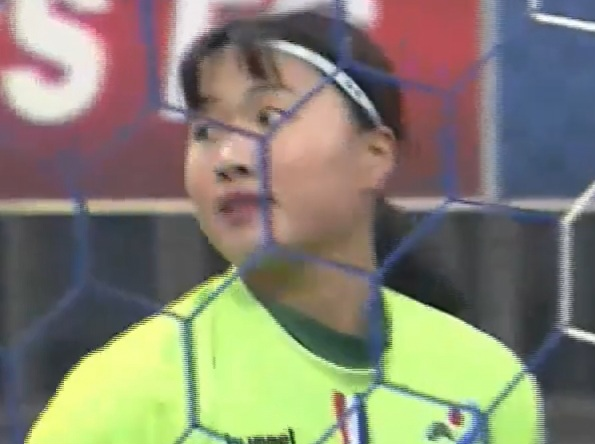

Personal information
- Date of birth: 3 September 1997 (age 29)
- Height: 1.74 m (5 ft 9 in)
- Position: Goalkeeper

Team information
- Current team: Seoul City

Youth career
- 2011-2012: Oju Middle School
- 2013-2015: Dongsan I.I. High School

International career^{‡}
Years	Team	Apps	(Gls)
2013	South Korea U-17	1	(0)
2015	South Korea U-20	0	(0)
2022-	South Korea	2	(0)
- ‡ National team caps and goals as of 2 June 2025

Ryu Ji-soo (Korean: 류지수; born September 3, 1997) is a South Korean footballer who plays as a goalkeeper for Seoul City and the South Korea national team. Ryu Ji-soo was selected to the 2023 FIFA Women's World Cup South Korean squad.

== Early life ==
Ryu first became interested in football in elementary school, but was discouraged by her parents, who felt she had talent in musical theatre. Her parents' attitude changed after seeing the success of South Korea's women's youth teams in international competitions, so as a middle school student, Ryu directly telephoned the Korea Football Association to try and find a school where she would be allowed to try out for the football team. On their recommendation she went to Oju Middle School in Songpa-gu and started playing football in the second grade, but struggled to match her peers who had been playing football for longer, and started playing as a goalkeeper. She attended Korea University in Sejong, an institution well known for its women's football, but was unable to join the team due to personal reasons, resulting in a three-year hiatus from football.

== Club career ==
After three years away from football, Ryu participated in the 2019 WK League draft and was signed by Suwon FC as their fifth-round pick. As the team's second goalkeeper, she didn't have many opportunities to play, and transferred to Seoul City Amazones in 2021 with the hope of getting more time on the pitch.

== International career ==
Having played football for only two years, Ryu was called up to the South Korea squad for the 2013 AFC U-16 Women's Championship. She also represented her country at U-20 level, travelling to Nanjing, China, as part of the squad for the 2015 AFC U-19 Women's Championship.
