= Yoo Young-sil =

South Korean footballer

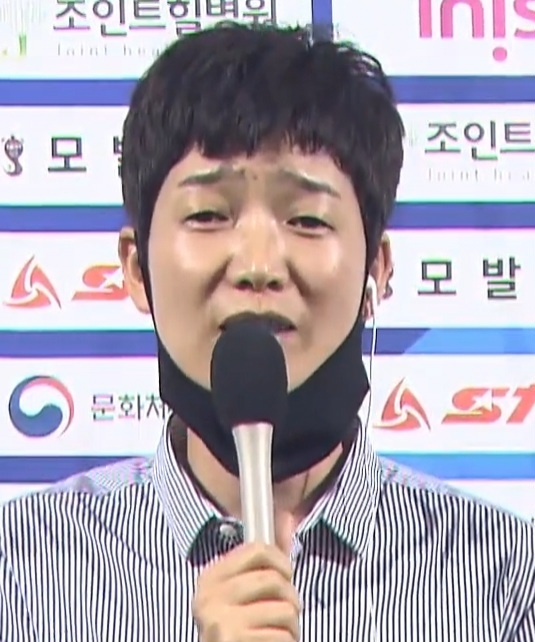

Personal information
- Full name: Yoo Young-sil
- Date of birth: May 1, 1975 (age 51)
- Place of birth: Goheung, Jeollanam-do, South Korea
- Height: 1.71 m (5 ft 7 in)
- Position: Defender

Youth career
- Kyunghee University

Senior career*
Years	Team	Apps	(Gls)
1998–2005	INI Steel		
2006	Chungnam Ilhwa Chunma		
2007–2008	Daekyo Kangaroos		

International career
1993–2008	Korea Republic	72	(6)

Managerial career
- 2009-2014: Dongsan Information Technical High School
- 2015: Seoul WFC (coach)
- 2016-2019: Daeduk College
- 2019-: Seoul WFC
- * Club domestic league appearances and goals

Yoo Young-sil (Korean: 유영실, Korean pronunciation: [ju.jʌŋ.ɕil]; born May 1, 1975) is a retired South Korean football player and coach who is currently the manager of Seoul City Amazones WFC. Sometimes referred to as "the female Hong Myung-bo" during her career for her reliable defensive play, she is considered part of the 'first generation' of the South Korean women's national team.

== Early life ==
In elementary school, Yoo played competitive badminton, but gave it up to focus on her studies. She started playing football in the first grade of high school when she heard about the newly established girls' football academy at Gwangyang Girls' High School. She went on to play for Kyunghee University.

== Club career ==
Upon graduation from Kyunghee University, Yoo took a break from football for eight months and contemplated giving it up entirely to become a P.E. teacher, but eventually joined Hyundai Steel in late 1998. The club dominated in domestic competitions as the only women's works football team to exist prior to 1999. Yoo quickly became a key player, earning individual recognition in her first season at the club, including being named MVP of the Korean Women's League.

In 2006, Yoo moved to newly established team Chungnam Ilhwa Chunma WFC. She recorded an assist in the final of the 14th Queen's Cup, helping the new club achieve its first tournament victory. After one season at Chungnam Ilhwa, she transferred to Daekyo Kangaroos as part of a direct trade between the two clubs. On 6 October 2008, Yoo announced her retirement from football.

== International career ==
Yoo began her international career as an 18-year-old defender, having played football for only a year at the time. She made her first appearance during 1993 AFC Women's Championship finals against Malaysia and scored her debut goal in the same game. Yoo wore the captain's armband for South Korea at the 2003 FIFA Women's World Cup. This was the first time South Korea's women's team qualified for the World Cup, and to mark the achievement Yoo was selected to be the first runner in the torch relay for the 2003 Summer Universiade, held in Daegu. Yoo later led the national team to victory at the 2005 EAFF Women's Football Championship, where she also picked up the Best Defender award.

== Managerial career ==
After retiring from football, Yoo turned to coaching. She was the first Korean woman to undertake a football coaching course overseas when she travelled to Japan in late 2008 to study at INAC Kobe Leonessa. She began her coaching career at the girls' football academy of Dongsan Information Technical High School in Seoul. When Yoo arrived at the school in 2009, there were not enough players to meet the minimum entry requirement for tournaments, but she worked hard to motivate the team, and in her final year at Dongsan, her squad won three domestic titles.

Yoo then spent a year as a coach at the WK League side Seoul WFC, before being appointed manager of the women's football team at Daeduk College. She led the team to tournament victory at the 26th Queen's Cup in 2018, and Yoo was honoured as 'Coach of the Year' by the Korea Football Association. Daeduk finished as runners-up at the Fall Korea Women's Football Championship the following year, and Yoo was also appointed as head coach of the Korean women's football team for the 2019 Summer Universiade.

Yoo returned to Seoul WFC, this time as manager, ahead of the 2020 WK League season. In early 2025, even with the start of the WK League season approaching, Yoo personally orchestrated a football coaching session for local girls, speaking publicly about the lack of resources for girls' football and saying she felt a responsibility to help future generations of Korean women's football. In the 2025 WK League, Seoul progressed to the league's championship final for the first time in 12 years.

== Career statistics ==
=== International ===
As of match played 24 February 2008

Appearances and goals by national team and year
National team	Year	Apps	Goals
South Korea	1993	1	1
South Korea	1994	3	0
South Korea	1995	5	0
South Korea	1996	0	0
South Korea	1997	2	0
South Korea	1998	5	0
South Korea	1999	7	1
South Korea	2000	4	0
South Korea	2001	7	2
South Korea	2002	6	0
South Korea	2003	17	0
South Korea	2004	5	2
South Korea	2005	4	0
South Korea	2006	0	0
South Korea	2007	3	0
South Korea	2008	3	0
Total		72	6

Scores and results list South Korea's goal tally first, score column indicates score after each Yoo Young-sil goal.

List of international goals scored by Yoo Young-sil
No.	Date	Venue	Opponent	Score	Result	Competition	Ref.
1	3 December 1993	Kuching, Malaysia	Malaysia		4–0	1993 Asian Women's Championship	
2	13 November 1999	Bacolod, Philippines	Guam		11-0	1999 AFC Women's Championship	
3	4 December 2001	New Taipei City, Taiwan	India	1–0	7-0	2001 AFC Women's Championship	
4	8 December 2001	New Taipei City, Taiwan	Malaysia	1-0	3-0	2001 AFC Women's Championship	
5	20 April 2004	Hiroshima Stadium, Hiroshima, Japan	Myanmar	6-0	7-0	2004 Summer Olympics (qualification)	
6	20 April 2004	Hiroshima Stadium, Hiroshima, Japan	Myanmar	7-0	7-0	2004 Summer Olympics (qualification)	

== Honors ==
=== Korea Republic ===
- Women's East Asian Cup Winner: 2005

=== Individual ===
- Women's East Asian Cup Best defender: 2005
- Korea Football Association awards
  - MVP (Women's): 2003
  - Coach of the Year: 2018
- President's Cup (Women's Division) Best defender: 1999
- Korean Women's League MVP: 1999
