= 2016 WK League =

WK League
- Season: 2016
- Dates: 14 March – 17 October 2016
- Champions: Incheon Hyundai Steel Red Angels (4th title)
- Matches: 84
- Goals: 239 (2.85 per match)
- Top goalscorer: Racheal Quigley (13 goals)
- Biggest home win: Hwacheon 5–1 Seoul
- Biggest away win: Boeun 1–5 Incheon
- (Note: All statistics do not include play-off matches)

The 2016 WK League was the eighth season of the WK League, South Korea's top level women's football league. The regular season began on 14 March 2016 and ended on 17 October 2016.

Busan Sangmu and Daejeon Sportstoto relocated to Boeun and Gumi and were renamed Boeun Sangmu and Gumi Sportstoto, respectively.

Incheon Hyundai Steel Red Angels won their fourth consecutive title by beating Icheon Daekyo in the playoffs final.

== Teams ==
Locations of the 2016 WK League teams

Team	City	Stadium	Capacity	Position in 2015
Boeun Sangmu	Boeun	Boeun Public Stadium	6,000	7th place
Gumi Sportstoto	Gumi	Gumi Civic Stadium	35,000	5th place
Hwacheon KSPO	Hwacheon	Hwacheon Sports Park	3,000	4th place
Icheon Daekyo	Icheon	Icheon City Stadium	20,305	Runners-up
Incheon Hyundai Steel Red Angels	Incheon	Incheon Namdong Asiad Rugby Field	5,078	Champions
Seoul WFC	Seoul	Hyochang Stadium	15,194	6th place
Suwon FMC	Suwon	Suwon Sports Complex	11,808	3rd place

== Regular season ==
=== League table ===
Pos	Team	Pld	W	D	L	GF	GA	GD	Pts	Qualification
1	Incheon Hyundai Steel Red Angels (C)	24	16	7	1	55	21	+34	55	Qualification for playoffs final
2	Icheon Daekyo	24	16	5	3	46	20	+26	53	Qualification for playoffs semi-final
3	Gumi Sportstoto	24	10	6	8	31	27	+4	36	Qualification for playoffs semi-final
4	Hwacheon KSPO	24	9	6	9	35	32	+3	33	
5	Seoul WFC	24	7	5	12	33	48	−15	26	
6	Suwon FMC	24	4	8	12	26	38	−12	20	
7	Boeun Sangmu	24	1	5	18	13	53	−40	8	

Source: KWFF
Rules for classification: 1) Points; 2) Goal difference; 3) Goals scored
(C) Champions

=== Results ===
==== Matches 1–12 ====
Home \ Away	BOE	ICD	GUM	HWA	INC	SEO	SUW
Boeun Sangmu	—	0–3	0–1	2–2	1–5	0–3	0–0
Icheon Daekyo	1–0	—	1–0	0–0	1–4	2–3	3–1
Gumi Sportstoto	3–0	1–1	—	2–0	0–1	0–0	0–0
Hwacheon KSPO	2–0	2–4	1–2	—	1–1	5–1	1–1
Incheon Hyundai Steel Red Angels	3–0	0–3	0–0	1–1	—	2–1	1–1
Seoul WFC	2–2	0–2	2–4	3–1	2–4	—	3–1
Suwon FMC	2–0	0–1	2–2	1–2	0–2	2–1	—

Source: Soccerway
Legend: Blue = home team win; Yellow = draw; Red = away team win.

==== Matches 13–24 ====
Home \ Away	BOE	ICD	GUM	HWA	INC	SEO	SUW
Boeun Sangmu	—	0–3	2–1	0–1	0–2	1–2	2–2
Icheon Daekyo	2–1	—	4–0	1–0	3–3	4–0	3–2
Gumi Sportstoto	3–0	1–1	—	3–1	0–3	2–1	0–1
Hwacheon KSPO	3–0	1–0	2–3	—	0–0	2–0	4–1
Incheon Hyundai Steel Red Angels	3–0	0–0	2–1	4–1	—	5–0	3–2
Seoul WFC	1–1	0–1	2–1	2–0	2–4	—	1–1
Suwon FMC	3–1	1–2	0–1	0–2	1–2	1–1	—

Source: Soccerway
Legend: Blue = home team win; Yellow = draw; Red = away team win.

== Championship playoffs ==
=== Bracket ===
Semi-final			Final
			1	Incheon Hyundai Steel Red Angels	0	4	4
2	Icheon Daekyo	2		Icheon Daekyo	0	0	0
3	Gumi Sportstoto	0

=== Semi-final ===
17 October 2016

Icheon Daekyo	2–0	Gumi Sportstoto

Icheon City Stadium, Icheon

=== Final ===
20 October 2016

Icheon Daekyo	0–0	Incheon Hyundai Steel Red Angels

Icheon City Stadium, Icheon

24 October 2016

Incheon Hyundai Steel Red Angels	4–0	Icheon Daekyo
Bia Zaneratto 24', 49', 78'; Yoo Young-a 27'	Report

Incheon Munhak Stadium, Incheon

Incheon Hyundai Steel Red Angels won 4–0 on aggregate.
