= An Jong-goan =

South Korean football manager

Personal information
- Date of birth: 30 August 1966 (age 60)

Managerial career
- Years: Team
- South Korea Women

An Jong-goan (Korean: 안종관; born 30 August 1966) is a South Korean football manager and former footballer who played as a defender.

== Career ==
His playing career was abruptly cut short at the age of 28 due to a knee injury.

An was the head coach of the South Korea women's national team at the 2003 FIFA Women's World Cup.
