= Han Chae-rin =

South Korean footballer (born 1996)

Personal information
- Date of birth: 2 September 1996 (age 30)
- Place of birth: South Korea
- Height: 1.63 m (5 ft 4 in)
- Position: Midfielder

Team information
- Current team: Seoul City
- Number: 7

Youth career
- Uiduk University

Senior career*
Years	Team	Apps	(Gls)
2018–2020	Incheon Red Angels		
2021–	Seoul City		

International career
2016	South Korea U20	6	(2)
2017–2019	South Korea	19	(3)
- * Club domestic league appearances and goals

- Han Chae-rin
- Hangul: 한채린
- RR: Han Chaerin
- MR: Han Ch'aerin

Han Chae-rin (Korean: 한채린; born 2 September 1996) is a South Korean footballer who plays as a midfielder for WK League club Seoul City.

== Club career ==
On 27 December 2017, Han was drafted fourth overall in the 2018 WK League Draft by Incheon Hyundai Steel Red Angels. On 23 April 2018, she made her debut in a 0–0 draw against Gyeongju KHNP. On 25 May 2018, she scored her first goal in a 6–2 win against Suwon UDC.

== International career ==
Han was selected in the squad for the 2016 FIFA U-20 Women's World Cup in Papua New Guinea, where she scored against Venezuela. On 19 October 2017, she scored on her senior debut, in a 3–1 loss to the United States. She went to her first major tournament the following year when she was selected for the 2018 AFC Women's Asian Cup.

== Honours ==
Individual

- KWFF WK League Awards Best XI: 2025
