= Park Eun-sun (footballer) =

South Korean footballer

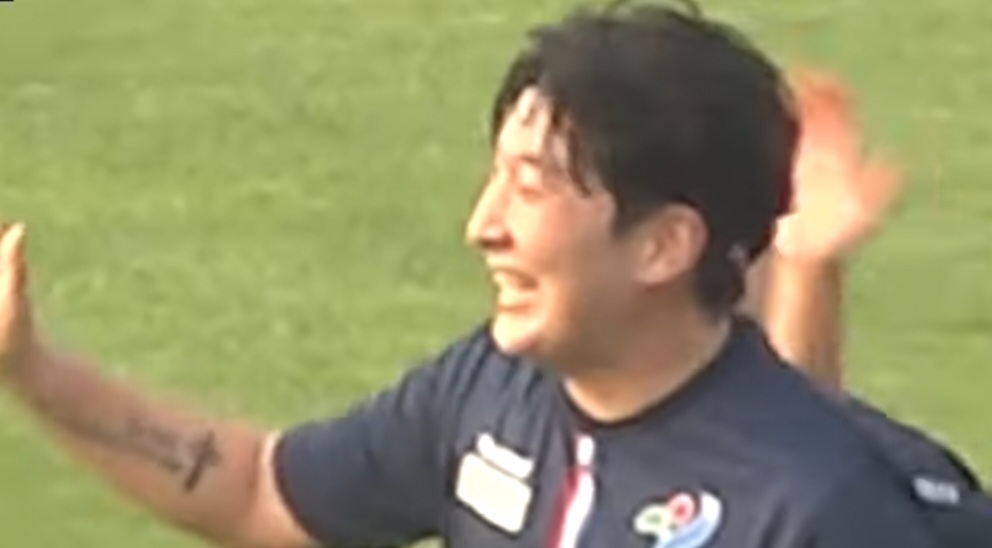

Personal information
- Date of birth: 25 December 1986 (age 39)
- Place of birth: Busan, South Korea
- Height: 1.82 m (6 ft 0 in)
- Position: Forward

Youth career
- Dongsan Information Industry High School

Senior career*
Years	Team	Apps	(Gls)
2005–2014	Seoul City		
2014–2015	WFC Rossiyanka	13	(4)
2015–2017	Icheon Daekyo		
2018–2019	Sejong Sportstoto		
2020–2023	Seoul City		

International career
2004–2006	South Korea U20	13	(14)
2003–2023	South Korea	49	(20)
Medal record
Asian Games
Bronze medal – third place	2010 Guangzhou	Team
Summer Universiade
Gold medal – first place	2009 Belgrade	Team
- * Club domestic league appearances and goals

- Park Eun-sun
- Hangul: 박은선
- RR: Bak Eunseon
- MR: Pak Ŭnsŏn

Park Eun-sun (Korean pronunciation: [pa.ɡɯn.sʌn] or [pak̚] [ɯn.sʌn]; born 25 December 1986) is a retired South Korean footballer who played as a forward.

== Early life ==
Park was born in the southern city of Busan. As a child Park enjoyed sports, taking part in taekwondo classes and playing football with her brother and other local children. While attending Okjeong Middle School in Seoul, she participated in an athletics competition where she was noticed by a sports coach from Changdeok Girls' Middle School. The coach suggested she pursue football more seriously, so she transferred to Changdeok, where there was a girls' football team. She continued to play while attending Wirye I.C.T. High School and was already playing for South Korea's senior national team by the time she graduated.

== Club career ==
=== Early years at Seoul WFC ===
Upon graduating from high school, Park received several offers from university football teams in Korea and clubs overseas but decided to join Seoul City WFC, with whom she was already training. The club offered her a salary of 35 million won, at the time the highest ever salary for a female footballer in South Korea. The Korea Women's Football Federation (KWFF) initially objected to Seoul's recruitment of Park due to rules stipulating that works teams could not sign high school players. However, Seoul manager Seo Jeong-ho argued that the KWFF had not been consistent with recruitment rules at the time of the club's foundation, and Park's father suggested that she may be forced to go overseas if not allowed to play at senior level in Korea. Eventually, Park joined Seoul City as planned, but was banned from KWFF competitions for two years. The ban was withdrawn in April 2006 after Park took legal action and fans filed a complaint with Korea's Human Rights Commission.

In February 2007, it was reported that ahead of a training camp in Kunming, China, Park told team staff she wanted to quit playing football. Amid reports of a dispute between her and Seoul's coaching staff, Park did not join the team for the camp. This incident followed Park's suspension from the national team for similar unauthorised absences from training camps. Park's father said that she was suffering from poor mental health due to the pressure of playing football professionally. After a few months away from the sport, Park returned to action at the 2007 National Women's Football Championship, coming on as a substitute in Seoul's first round match against Chungnam Ilhwa.

A similar incident followed in 2009, when Park left the team just days ahead of the inaugural WK League season. Seoul manager Seo Jeong-ho publicly stated that Park would have to make a choice between re-joining and fully committing to the team, or paying a substantial fine to leave the club. She was absent throughout the 2009 season but returned to training with the club ahead of the 2010 WK League. She took another break from football in 2010 after the death of her father, during which time she held part-time jobs including selling cheering accessories at Jamsil Baseball Stadium, serving in a pub, and working in an internet cafe.

=== Gender accusations and move to Russia ===
In 2013, Park was at the centre of a controversy that began when representatives of the other six clubs in the WK League claimed that she was male and threatened to boycott the league if Park did not undergo a gender verification test. Seoul City stood by Park, accusing their rivals of violating her human rights in an attempt to gain a competitive advantage by keeping their star player out of the league. The National Human Rights Commission labelled calls for gender testing as sexual harassment and advised the Korea Football Association (KFA) to punish the coaches of the other teams, but neither the KFA nor the KWFF acted on the recommendations. Park was critical of the rival coaches for previously praising her when they hoped to recruit her, but turning against her now that she was playing for a rival team. As a result of the controversy, after taking some time away from football, Park left Seoul in 2014 to join Russian side WFC Rossiyanka.

=== Return to WK League ===
Park initially signed an eighteen-month contract with Rossiyanka but following contract issues and an ankle injury, Park left the club after only a year and returned to the WK League, joining Icheon Daekyo WFC. Daekyo were the only one of the six clubs which had questioned her gender to have replaced their manager in the meantime. Park's contract with Daekyo saw her earn a salary of 50 million won, the highest amount allowed under league rules. When Icheon Daekyo was disbanded in 2017, Park moved to Gumi Sportstoto along with several of her teammates.

Park considered retiring from football but in 2020 returned to Seoul City, now managed by former Korea teammate Yoo Young-sil. She remained at the club until her retirement from football after the conclusion of the 2023 season. Park had hoped to renew her contract with Seoul for another season but the club did not make her an offer. The KWFF honoured her with a retirement ceremony at Seoul City's home ground, the auxiliary field of Seoul World Cup Stadium, in March 2024.

== International career ==
=== South Korea U-20 ===
Park, having already made her senior debut, played for South Korea's U-20 team at the 2004 AFC U-19 Women's Championship, where she scored a hattrick in the final against China. Having scored a total of eight goals, Park was named tournament MVP. She also played at the 2004 FIFA U-19 Women's World Championship and the 2006 AFC U-19 Women's Championship.

=== South Korea ===
Park made her full international debut on 8 June 2003 at the 2003 AFC Women's Championship, becoming the youngest player ever to represent South Korea at senior level across both the men's and women's teams. She scored four goals in her debut match. Park was South Korea's top goalscorer at the tournament with seven goals in total, helping the team on their way to a third place finish, which secured South Korea qualification to the FIFA Women's World Cup for the first time. Appearing at the 2003 tournament, Park was the youngest player to represent South Korea at a World Cup until Casey Phair broke her record in 2023. She was part of the South Korean squad that lifted the trophy on home soil at the 2005 EAFF Women's Cup.

In 2006, Park was suspended from the national team for six months due to unauthorised absences from training camps on two separate occasions. She received her next call-up for South Korea in 2008, but declined the invitation on the basis that she had yet to physically and mentally recover following an ankle injury sustained the previous year. Ahead of the 2010 AFC Women's Asian Cup, a coach with China's national team told local press that they would appeal to the AFC to test Park's gender, should she be selected for the tournament. In the end, Park was not included in the final squad list for the tournament.

Park returned to the national team for the 2014 AFC Women's Asian Cup. At the tournament, which saw South Korea finish fourth to qualify for the World Cup, Park was joint top goalscorer, winning the Golden Boot award as she had recorded one more assist than Chinese striker Yang Li. Despite two separate ankle injuries in the months leading up to the tournament, Park played at the 2015 FIFA Women's World Cup in Canada, where South Korea progressed into the knockout stage for the first time.

Park received her first national team call-up in seven years under manager Colin Bell when she was selected ahead of the 2022 EAFF E-1 Football Championship. The following year, she recorded her first international goal in almost nine years when she scored in a friendly match against Zambia, held as part of South Korea's preparations for the upcoming 2023 FIFA Women's World Cup. Park was subsequently selected to play in her third World Cup. South Korea failed to progress from the group stage of the tournament, but Park played in all three of their matches, including the 1-1 draw against Germany that saw the two-time champions fail to reach the knockout stage for the first time ever.

== Style of play ==
Mostly playing as a centre forward, Park was known throughout her playing career for her powerful striking and ability to score goals both in open play and from set pieces. Standing at 182 cm, she was often one of the tallest players on the pitch and was valued for her success in aerial duels. Thanks to her height and physique she was able to physically dominate defenders, and for the South Korea national team she often worked in combination with Ji So-yun, by contrast known for her slight stature and agility. She has sometimes been referred to as "Park-latan", a nickname combining her name with that of Swedish footballer Zlatan Ibrahimović.

== Personal life ==
Park's father Park Sun-gwon, who supported her throughout her youth and in the early years of her professional career, died of osteomyelitis in February 2010. After his death Park was burdened with debt due to hospital expenses.

Park is a Christian. She has several tattoos including a cross and a tiger, the animal of her birth year in the Chinese zodiac.

== Career statistics ==
=== International ===
As of match played 30 September 2023

Appearances and goals by national team and year
National team	Year	Apps	Goals
South Korea	2003	12	7
South Korea	2004	5	3
South Korea	2005	4	1
South Korea	2014	5	6
South Korea	2015	9	0
South Korea	2022	4	0
South Korea	2023	10	3
Total		49	20

Scores and results list South Korea's goal tally first, score column indicates score after each Park Eun-sun goal.

List of international goals scored by Park Eun-sun
No.	Date	Venue	Opponent	Score	Result	Competition	Ref.
1	8 June 2003	Rajamangala Stadium, Bangkok, Thailand	Hong Kong	5-0	8-0	2003 AFC Women's Championship	
2	8 June 2003	Rajamangala Stadium, Bangkok, Thailand	Hong Kong	6-0	8-0	2003 AFC Women's Championship	
3	8 June 2003	Rajamangala Stadium, Bangkok, Thailand	Hong Kong	7-0	8-0	2003 AFC Women's Championship	
4	8 June 2003	Rajamangala Stadium, Bangkok, Thailand	Hong Kong	8-0	8-0	2003 AFC Women's Championship	
5	10 June 2003	Rajamangala Stadium, Bangkok, Thailand	Thailand	4-0	6-0	2003 AFC Women's Championship	
6	10 June 2003	Rajamangala Stadium, Bangkok, Thailand	Thailand	5-0	6-0	2003 AFC Women's Championship	
7	12 June 2003	Rajamangala Stadium, Bangkok, Thailand	Singapore	1-0	4-0	2003 AFC Women's Championship	
8	18 April 2004	Hiroshima Stadium, Hiroshima, Japan	Guam	1-0	7-0	2004 Olympics qualifying competition	
9	20 April 2004	Hiroshima Stadium, Hiroshima, Japan	Myanmar	1-0	7-0	2004 Olympics qualifying competition	
10	26 April 2004	Hiroshima Stadium, Hiroshima, Japan	North Korea	1-2	1-5	2004 Olympics qualifying competition	
11	1 August 2005	Jeonju World Cup Stadium, Jeonju, South Korea	China	2-0	2-0	2005 EAFF E-1 Football Championship	
12	15 May 2014	Thống Nhất Stadium, Ho Chi Minh City, Vietnam	Myanmar	2-0	12-0	2014 AFC Women's Asian Cup	
13	15 May 2014	Thống Nhất Stadium, Ho Chi Minh City, Vietnam	Myanmar	6-0	12-0	2014 AFC Women's Asian Cup	
14	17 May 2014	Thống Nhất Stadium, Ho Chi Minh City, Vietnam	Thailand	2-0	4-0	2014 AFC Women's Asian Cup	
15	17 May 2014	Thống Nhất Stadium, Ho Chi Minh City, Vietnam	Thailand	3-0	4-0	2014 AFC Women's Asian Cup	
16	17 May 2014	Thống Nhất Stadium, Ho Chi Minh City, Vietnam	Thailand	4-0	4-0	2014 AFC Women's Asian Cup	
17	22 May 2014	Thống Nhất Stadium, Ho Chi Minh City, Vietnam	Australia	1-1	1-2	2014 AFC Women's Asian Cup	
18	7 April 2023	Suwon World Cup Stadium, Suwon, South Korea	Zambia	5-2	5-2	Friendly	
19	11 April 2023	Yongin Mireu Stadium, Yongin, South Korea	Zambia	2-0	5-0	Friendly	
20	11 April 2023	Yongin Mireu Stadium, Yongin, South Korea	Zambia	5-0	5-0	Friendly	
