= Hyun Seul-gi =

South Korean footballer (born 2001)

Personal information
- Date of birth: January 28, 2001 (age 25)
- Place of birth: Seoul, South Korea
- Height: 1.64 m (5 ft 5 in)
- Position: Winger

Team information
- Current team: Gyeongju KHNP
- Number: 11

Youth career
- 2013-2015: Yeseong Girls' Middle School
- 2016-2018: Yeseong Girls' High School
- 2019-2020: Gangwon State University

Senior career*
Years	Team	Apps	(Gls)
2021-	Gyeongju KHNP		

International career^{‡}
2014-2015	South Korea U-14	5	(2)
2016	South Korea U-17	3	(5)
2019	South Korea U-20	5	(1)
2024-	South Korea	8	(1)
- * Club domestic league appearances and goals ‡ National team caps and goals as of 11:35, 17 September 2026 (UTC)

Hyun Seul-gi (Korean: 현슬기, born 28 January 2001) is a South Korean footballer who plays as a winger for WK League side Gyeongju KHNP and the South Korea national team.

== Youth career ==
Hyun played for Yeseong Girls' Middle School and Yeseong Girls' High School in Chungju. Hyun was part of the Yeseong Girls' High School side that won the KWFF Spring Championship, the Queen's Cup, and the National Sports Festival in 2017. The team also lifted the U-18 trophy at the 2017 Kanga Cup in Australia, where Hyun scored twice in the final, which Yeseong won 10–1. Hyun was named in Chungju Football Association's 2017 Best XI for her contributions to Yeseong's successful season.

== Club career ==
Hyun was selected by Gyeongju KHNP in the second round of the 2021 WK League new players' draft. Hyun scored in KHNP's 4–3 victory over Suwon FC in the 2022 WK League playoff, helping take the club to their third consecutive championship final against Incheon Hyundai Steel Red Angels.

== International career ==
Hyun received her first senior call-up for South Korea in 2022 but had to withdraw from the squad after contracting COVID-19. She eventually made her full international debut in a 2024 friendly against Spain under manager Shin Sang-woo. She was part of the South Korean side that won the 2025 EAFF E-1 Football Championship, having been called up as a replacement for Choe Yu-ri, who withdrew from the squad due to injury. Hyun was named in South Korea's squad for the 2026 Asian Games.

== International goals ==
No.	Date	Venue	Opponent	Score	Result	Competition
1.	17 September 2026	Nagai Stadium, Osaka, Japan	Bangladesh	5–0	6–0	2026 Asian Games

== Style of play ==
Hyun is known for her speed and goal-scoring ability. Her particular skill at scoring headed goals has earned her the nickname "Golden Head" among her teammates at Gyeongju.
