= South Korea women's national football team =

Women's national association football team representing South Korea

Korea Republic
- Nickname(s): Taegeuk Ladies (태극낭자); Tigresses of Asia (아시아의 호랑이)
- Association: Korea Football Association
- Confederation: AFC (Asia)
- Sub-confederation: EAFF (East Asia)
- Head coach: Shin Sang-woo
- Most caps: Ji So-yun (182)
- Top scorer: Ji So-yun (76)
- FIFA code: KOR
First colours	Second colours

FIFA ranking
- Current: 17 ▲2 (20 October 2026)
- Highest: 14 (December 2017, September 2018 – March 2019)
- Lowest: 26 (August 2004 – June 2005)

First international
- Japan 13–1 South Korea (Seoul, South Korea; 6 September 1990)

Biggest win
- South Korea 19–0 Northern Mariana Islands (Tainan County, Taiwan; 26 August 2009)

Biggest defeat
- Japan 13–1 South Korea (Seoul, South Korea; 6 September 1990)

World Cup
- Appearances: 5 (first in 2003)
- Best result: Round of 16 (2015)

Asian Cup
- Appearances: 14 (first in 1991)
- Best result: Runners-up (2022)

Asian Games
- Appearances: 10 (first in 1990)
- Best result: Bronze medalists (2010, 2014, 2018, 2026)

EAFF Championship
- Appearances: 9 (first in 2005)
- Best result: Champions (2005, 2025)
Medal record
AFC Women's Asian Cup
Silver medal – second place	2022 India	Team
Bronze medal – third place	2003 Thailand
Asian Games
Bronze medal – third place	2010 Guangzhou	Team
Bronze medal – third place	2014 Incheon	Team
Bronze medal – third place	2018 Jakarta-Palembang	Team
EAFF Championship
Gold medal – first place	2005 South Korea
Gold medal – first place	2025 South Korea
Silver medal – second place	2015 China	Team
Silver medal – second place	2019 South Korea	Team
Bronze medal – third place	2010 Japan
Bronze medal – third place	2013 South Korea
Bronze medal – third place	2022 Japan

The South Korea women's national football team (Korean: 대한민국 여자 축구 국가대표팀, recognised as Korea Republic by FIFA) represents South Korea in international women's football competitions. The South Korean women's team has qualified for five FIFA World Cups in 2003, 2015 (when they reached the round of 16), 2019, 2023 and 2027.

== History ==
=== Early history ===
Less than a year after the government of the Republic of Korea was established in 1948, the first official women's football matches were held in Seoul on 28 and 29 June 1949, as a part of the National Girls' and Women's Sport Games. While women's basketball and volleyball won public recognition through the Games, football was seen as being unsuitable for women and unattractive to the public. As a result, the women's teams were disbanded soon after the event.

When women's football was officially adopted at the 1990 Asian Games in Beijing, the South Korean sports authorities decided to form a women's team with athletes from other sports and send the team to the Games. The result was defeat in all matches against Japan, North Korea, China and Chinese Taipei. Nevertheless, colleges and corporations started to launch women's football teams through the 1990s and the first annual national women's football event, the Queen's Cup, was held in 1993. When the 1999 FIFA Women's World Cup sparked interest worldwide, the South Korean ministry in charge of sports sponsored the foundation of new teams and tournaments for girls’ high school teams, university teams and company teams. To promote women's football, the Korea Women's Football Federation (KWFF) was established in March 2001, as an independent organization in association with the Korea Football Association (KFA).

=== World Cup debut ===
South Korea finished in third place at the 2003 AFC Women's Championship and qualified for the FIFA Women's World Cup for the first time. The Taegeuk Ladies were drawn in Group B with Norway, France and Brazil. Their first match played at the World Cup was a 3–0 loss to Brazil. They then lost 1–0 to France and 7–1 to Norway, with Kim Jin-hee scoring South Korea's first ever World Cup goal against the latter. They also won the inaugural EAFF Championship on home soil in 2005.

The notable talents in South Korea appeared in the late 2000s. They won the 2009 Summer Universiade and the 2010 FIFA U-17 Women's World Cup, as well as finishing third at the 2010 FIFA U-20 Women's World Cup. The number of Women's World Cup berths in Asia was increased from three to five in 2012, which saw South Korea qualify for the 2015 FIFA Women's World Cup as the fourth-placed team at the 2014 AFC Women's Asian Cup. They earned their first ever World Cup victory by defeating Spain 2–1 after a 2–0 loss to Brazil and a 2–2 draw with Costa Rica in Group E. They made it out of the group stage for the first time with the new generation, although losing 3–0 to France in the round of 16.

== Team image ==
=== Nicknames ===
The South Korea women's national football team has been known or nicknamed as the "Taegeuk Ladies" (태극낭자, Taegeuk Nangja).

=== Kits and crest ===
The women's team usually use exactly the same kit as its male counterpart, along with the combinations available, as of 2023. However, there were many combinations that the men's team never used.

Kit used at the 2003 AFC Women's Championship in the match against North Korea.	Kit used at the 2003 FIFA Women's World Cup in the match against Brazil.	Kit used at the 2015 FIFA Women's World Cup	Kit used at the 2015 FIFA Women's World Cup

Kit used at the 2019 FIFA Women's World Cup	Kit used at the 2019 FIFA Women's World Cup	Kit used at the 2022 AFC Women's Asian Cup.	Kit used at the 2022 AFC Women's Asian Cup.

=== Rivalries ===
South Korea has a long-standing football rivalry with Japan. The two sides met for the first time in 1990, when South Korea suffered a 1–13 defeat at the hands of Japan. The South Korea women's team trailed behind Japan with just 4 wins, 11 draws and 18 losses as of 2022, in contrast to the fairly dominant performance of the men's team. The reason for South Korea's weaker performance against Japan is that South Korea started to develop women's football much later than Japan. South Korea's WK League was founded 20 years later than Japan's Nadeshiko League.

== Results and fixtures ==
The following is a list of match results in the last 12 months, as well as any future matches that have been scheduled.

Legend

Win Draw Loss Fixture

=== 2025 ===
28 November Friendly	Wales	1–1	South Korea	Málaga, Spain
19:00 UTC+1	Ingle 4'	Report	Kim Min-ji 67'	Referee: Caroline Lanssens (Belgium)

2 December Friendly	Netherlands	5–0	South Korea	Waalwijk, Netherlands
20:45 UTC+1	Miedema 9', 17', 31', 38'; Peddemors 43'	Report

=== 2026 ===
2 March AFC Women's Asian Cup GS	South Korea	3–0	Iran	Gold Coast, Australia
19:00 UTC+10	Choe Yu-ri 37'; Kim Hye-ri 59' (pen.); Ko Yoo-jin 75'	Report (AFC); Report (FIFA)		Stadium: Gold Coast Stadium; Attendance: 2,874; Referee: Veronika Bernatskaia (Kyrgyzstan)

5 March AFC Women's Asian Cup GS	Philippines	0–3	South Korea	Gold Coast, Australia
13:00 UTC+10		Report (AFC); Report (FIFA)	Jeon Yu-gyeong 12'; Park Soo-jeong 15'; Mun Eun-ju 56'	Stadium: Gold Coast Stadium; Attendance: 2,332; Referee: Lê Thị Ly (Vietnam)

8 March AFC Women's Asian Cup GS	Australia	3–3	South Korea	Sydney, Australia
20:00 UTC+11	Kennedy 33', 90+8'; Kerr 45+6'	Report (AFC); Report (FIFA)	Mun Eun-ju 13'; Kim Shin-ji 53' (pen.); Kang Chae-rim 56'	Stadium: Stadium Australia; Referee: Yoshimi Yamashita (Japan)

14 March AFC Women's Asian Cup QF	South Korea	6–0	Uzbekistan	Sydney, Australia
20:00 UTC+11	Son Hwa-yeon 9'; Ko Yoo-jin 20'; Park Soo-jeong 57'; Ji So-yun 72'; Lee Eun-young 85'; Jang Sel-gi 90+3' (pen.)	Report (AFC); Report (FIFA)		Stadium: Stadium Australia; Attendance: 12,974; Referee: Lara Lee (Australia)

18 March AFC Women's Asian Cup SF	South Korea	1–4	Japan	Sydney, Australia
20:00 UTC+11	Kang Chae-rim 78'	Report (AFC); Report (FIFA)	Ueki 15'; Hamano 25'; Kumagai 75'; Chiba 81'	Stadium: Stadium Australia; Attendance: 17,367; Referee: Veronika Bernatskaia (Kyrgyzstan)

11 April 2026 FIFA Series	Brazil	5–1	South Korea	Cuiabá, Brazil
21:30 UTC−4	Ary Borges 42'; Ludmila 47'; Dudinha 58'; Kerolin 61'; T. Maranhão 83'	Report (FIFA)	Park Soo-jeong 87'	Stadium: Arena Pantanal; Referee: Laura Fortunato (Argentina)

14 April 2026 FIFA Series	Canada	3–1	South Korea	Cuiabá, Brazil
15:30 UTC−4	Viens 23'; Gilles 50', 70'	Report (FIFA)	Kim Shin-ji 29'	Stadium: Arena Pantanal; Referee: Charly Deretti (Brazil)

18 April 2026 FIFA Series	South Korea	1–1	Zambia	Cuiabá, Brazil
15:30 UTC−4	C. Phair 45+3'	Report (FIFA)	B. Banda 26' (pen.)	Stadium: Arena Pantanal; Referee: Edina Batista (Brazil)

3 June EAFF E-1 Football Championship Preliminary round GS	Guam	0–5	South Korea	Dededo, Guam
18:00 UTC+10		Report (EAFF)	Jang You-been 4', 28'; Son Hwa-yeon 6', 43'; Ko Yoo-jin 57'	Stadium: GFA National Training Center; Referee: Yoshimi Yamashita (Japan)

5 June EAFF E-1 Football Championship Preliminary round GS	Macau	0–13 (Note: The Korea Football Association explained, 'We were notified by the EAFF via official letter on the night of the 30th of last month that the match against Macau among the three qualifying matches played by South Korea will not be recognized as an official A match.' According to FIFA regulations, the principle is that a national team may play a maximum of two matches during the A match window. However, as the EAFF's request for FIFA approval was delayed, the current EAFF qualifying schedule does not meet the minimum 48-hour rest period required before matches to protect players. In the past, FIFA approved EAFF qualifying matches held in the same or similar manner without raising issues, but as FIFA has recently applied related regulations more strictly, this measure was taken.)	South Korea	Dededo, Guam
14:30 UTC+10		Report (EAFF)	Kim Ji-yun 3'; Jang You-been 4', 53'; Kim Ji-hyeon 11', 22', 46'; Weng Lam Chong 49' (o.g.); Lee Min-hwa 57', 76'; Park Ye-na 79'; Son Hwa-yeon 81'; Jang Sel-gi 86', 90'	Stadium: GFA National Training Center; Referee: Sugino Azusa (Japan)

9 June EAFF E-1 Football Championship Preliminary round Final	South Korea	5–3 (a.e.t.)	Chinese Taipei	Dededo, Guam
18:00 UTC+10	Yoon Su-jeong 50', 105'; Kim Hye-ri 53' (pen.); Jang Sel-gi 114'; Jeong Yu-jin 120'	Report (EAFF)	Hsu Yi-yun 54'; Chen Jin-wen 61'; Li Yi-wen 106'	Stadium: GFA National Training Center; Referee: Koizumi Asaka (Japan)

14 September 2026 Asian Games GS	South Korea	5–0	Myanmar	Osaka, Japan
19:30 UTC+9	Kim Min-ji 29', 33', 59'; Jang Sel-gi 38'; Choe Yu-ri 76'	Report		Stadium: Nagai Stadium; Attendance: 500; Referee: Tian Jin (China)

17 September 2026 Asian Games GS	Bangladesh	0–6	South Korea	Osaka, Japan
16:00 UTC+9		Report	Kim Min-ji 16'; Jeong Da-bin 42'; Choe Yu-ri 65'; Ji So-yun 77'; Hyun Seul-gi 79'; Ko Yoo-jin 90+1'	Stadium: Nagai Stadium; Attendance: 135; Referee: Fatemeh Nasiri Looshani (Iran)

21 September 2026 Asian Games GS	South Korea	1–1	North Korea	Fukuroi, Japan
16:00 UTC+9	Yoon Su-jeong 46'	Report	Chae Un-yong 35'	Stadium: Shizuoka Stadium; Attendance: 2,032; Referee: Supiree Testhomya (Thailand)

25 September 2026 Asian Games QF	South Korea	6–3	Uzbekistan	Osaka, Japan
19:30 UTC+9	Yoon Su-jeong 6', 44'; Choe Yu-ri 17', 45+1'; Khabibullaeva 74' (o.g.); Kim Min-ji 90+4'	Report	Khabibullaeva 10'; Jang Sel-gi 64' (o.g.); Kudratova 66'	Stadium: Nagai Stadium; Attendance: 240; Referee: Mu Mingxin (China)

29 September 2026 Asian Games SF	Japan	2–0	South Korea	Fukuroi, Japan
19:30 UTC+9	Kamiya 54', 63'	Report		Stadium: Shizuoka Stadium; Attendance: 998; Referee: Lê Thị Ly (Vietnam)

2 October 2026 Asian Games 3rd	China	0–1	South Korea	Fukuroi, Japan
19:30 UTC+9		Report	Noh Jin-young 4'	Stadium: Shizuoka Stadium; Attendance: 1,331; Referee: Rawdha Al-Mansoori (United Arab Emirates)

28 November Friendly	Catalonia	v	South Korea	Barcelona, Spain
				Stadium: Camp Municipal Narcís Sala

1 December Friendly	Belgium	v	South Korea	Girona, Spain

=== 2027 ===
19 April 2028 Olympic Qualifiers	China	v	South Korea	China
		Report

24 April 2028 Olympic Qualifiers	South Korea	v	North Korea	South Korea
		Report

June 2027 World Cup GS	South Korea	v	TBD	Brazil

June/July 2027 World Cup GS	South Korea	v	TBD	Brazil

July 2027 World Cup GS	South Korea	v	TBD	Brazil

7 October 2028 Olympic Qualifiers	Philippines	v	South Korea	Philippines
		Report

12 October 2028 Olympic Qualifiers	South Korea	v	Philippines	South Korea
		Report

29 November 2028 Olympic Qualifiers	South Korea	v	China	South Korea
		Report

4 December 2028 Olympic Qualifiers	North Korea	v	South Korea
		Report

- "South Korea Results and Fixtures". Soccerway.

== All-time results ==
As of 27 February 2024

Results by year						FIFA ranking by year				
Year	Pld	W	D	L	Win %	Rank	BR	BM	WR	WM
Total	257	112	46	99	43.58	14	14	▲4	26	▼6
2024	6	3	0	3	50.00					
2023	16	7	3	6	43.75					
2022	14	8	4	2	57.14	15	15	▲2	18	▼1
2021	8	3	2	3	37.50	18	18	▲1	19	▼1
2020	2	2	0	0	100.00	18	18	▲2	18	Steady
2019	16	4	3	9	25.00	20	14	Steady	20	▼6
2018	14	8	4	2	57.14	14	14	▲1	16	▼2
2017	13	5	2	6	38.46	14	14	▲1	17	▼1
2016	13	7	2	4	53.85	18	17	▲1	19	▼2
2015	19	7	3	9	36.84	18	17	▲1	18	▼1
2014	19	12	4	3	63.16	17	17	Steady	18	▼1
2013	13	4	1	8	30.77	17	16	Steady	17	▼1
2012	7	3	3	1	42.86	16	15	▲1	16	Steady
2011	10	3	3	4	30.00	16	16	▲2	16	Steady
2010	13	6	4	3	46.15	18	18	▲3	21	Steady
2009	6	5	0	1	83.33	21	21	▲1	21	Steady
2008	17	7	1	9	41.18	22	22	▲2	25	Steady
2007	15	6	3	6	40.00	25	25	Steady	25	▼2
2006	12	4	0	8	33.33	23	22	▲1	23	▼1
2005	6	3	2	1	50.00	23	22	▲4	26	Steady
2004	2	2	0	0	100.00	26	24	▲1	26	▼2
2003	11	2	2	7	18.18	25	25	▲3	25	Steady
2002	3	0	0	3	0.00	Not introduced				
1996	2	1	0	1	50.00	Not introduced				

== Coaching staff ==
=== Current coaching staff ===
As of 17 October 2024

Position	Name
Head coach	(South Korea) Shin Sang-woo
Assistant coach	(South Korea) Park Youn-jeong
First-team coach	(South Korea) Go Hyun-bok
Goalkeeping coach	(South Korea) Chung Yoo-suk
Fitness coach	(South Korea) Jung Hyun-gyu

=== Manager history ===
As of 10 October 2024

No.	Manager	Year	P	W	D	L	Win %	Competition(s)
1	(South Korea) Park Kyung-hwa	1990						1990 Asian Games fifth place
2	(South Korea) Moon Jung-sik	1990–1991						1991 AFC Women's Championship group stage
3	(South Korea) Lee Yi-woo	1991–1999						1993 AFC Women's Championship group stage 1994 Asian Games fourth place 1995 AFC Women's Championship fourth place 1997 AFC Women's Championship group stage 1998 Asian Games group stage
4	(South Korea) Yoo Kee-heung	1999–2001						1999 AFC Women's Championship group stage
5	(South Korea) An Jong-goan	2001–2002						2001 AFC Women's Championship fourth place
6	(South Korea) Lee Young-gi	2002						2002 Asian Games fourth place
7	(South Korea) An Jong-goan	2003						2003 AFC Women's Championship third place 2003 FIFA Women's World Cup group stage
8	(South Korea) Choi Chu-kyung	2004						—
9	(South Korea) An Jong-goan	2005–2006						2005 EAFF Championship champion 2006 AFC Women's Asian Cup group stage 2006 Asian Games fourth place
10	(South Korea) An Ik-soo	2007–2009						2008 AFC Women's Asian Cup group stage 2008 EAFF Championship fourth place
11	(South Korea) Lee Sang-yup	2010						2010 EAFF Championship third place 2010 AFC Women's Asian Cup group stage
12	(South Korea) Choi In-cheol	2010–2011						2010 Asian Games bronze medal
13	(South Korea) Park Nam-yeol	2012						—
14	(South Korea) Yoon Deok-yeo	2012–2019						2013 EAFF Championship third place 2014 AFC Women's Asian Cup fourth place 2014 Asian Games bronze medal 2015 FIFA Women's World Cup round of 16; 2015 EAFF Championship runner-up 2017 EAFF Championship fourth place 2018 AFC Women's Asian Cup fifth place 2018 Asian Games bronze medal 2019 FIFA Women's World Cup group stage
15	(England) Colin Bell	2019–2024						2019 EAFF Championship runner-up 2022 AFC Women's Asian Cup runner-up 2022 EAFF Championship third place 2023 FIFA Women's World Cup group stage 2022 Asian Games quarter-finals
16	(South Korea) Shin Sang-woo	2024–						2025 EAFF Championship champion 2026 Asian Games bronze medal

== Players ==
=== Current squad ===
The following players were called up to the friendly matches against Catalonia and Belgium on 28 November and 2 December 2026, respectively.

Caps and goals correct as of 2 October 2026, after the match against China.

No.	Pos.	Player	Date of birth (age)	Caps	Goals	Club
	GK	Kim Kyeong-hee	17 March 2003 (age 23)	4	0	(Korea Football Association) Suwon FC
	GK	Kim Min-young	14 November 2001 (age 25)	0	0	(Korea Football Association) Hwacheon KSPO
	DF	Kim Hye-ri	25 June 1990 (age 36)	148	3	(Korea Football Association) Suwon FC
	DF	Choo Hyo-joo	29 July 2000 (age 26)	68	6	(Canadian Soccer Association) Ottawa Rapid
	DF	Noh Jin-young	3 June 2000 (age 26)	19	1	(Korea Football Association) Gyeongju KHNP
	DF	Ko Yoo-jin (captain)	24 January 1997 (age 29)	18	4	(Korea Football Association) Incheon Hyundai Steel Red Angels
	DF	Lee Min-hwa	29 October 1999 (age 27)	12	0	(Korea Football Association) Hwacheon KSPO
	DF	Han Da-in	9 February 2002 (age 24)	7	0	(Korea Football Association) Suwon FC
	DF	Nam Seung-eun	10 January 2006 (age 20)	3	0	(Japan Football Association) Bunnys Gunma
	DF	Lee Yu-jin	15 May 2000 (age 26)	2	0	(Korea Football Association) Suwon FC
	MF	Ji So-yun	21 February 1991 (age 35)	182	76	(Korea Football Association) Suwon FC
	MF	Lee Geum-min	7 April 1994 (age 32)	101	27	(The Football Association) Birmingham City
	MF	Choe Yu-ri	16 September 1994 (age 32)	79	18	(Korea Football Association) Suwon FC
	MF	Kang Chae-rim	23 March 1998 (age 28)	55	10	(Korea Football Association) Gangjin Swans
	MF	Lee Eun-young	31 March 2002 (age 24)	28	2	(Norwegian Football Federation) Molde
	MF	Kim Shin-ji	3 May 2004 (age 22)	19	2	(Royal Spanish Football Federation) Deportivo Alavés
	MF	Jung Min-young	28 September 2000 (age 26)	17	1	(Canadian Soccer Association) Ottawa Rapid
	MF	Kim Min-ji	21 August 2003 (age 23)	16	6	(Korea Football Association) Seoul WFC
	MF	Park Soo-jeong	3 November 2004 (age 22)	10	3	(Italian Football Federation) AC Milan
	MF	Yoon Su-jeong	20 June 2002 (age 24)	8	5	(Korea Football Association) Suwon FC
	MF	Han Min-seo	22 June 2006 (age 20)	0	0	(Korea Football Association) Korea University
	FW	Casey Phair	29 June 2007 (age 19)	24	5	(Royal Dutch Football Association) Feyenoord
	FW	Jeon Yu-gyeong	20 January 2004 (age 22)	5	1	(Norwegian Football Federation) Molde

=== Recent call-ups ===
The following players have been called up to the South Korea squad in the past 12 months.

Pos.	Player	Date of birth (age)	Caps	Goals	Club	Latest call-up
GK	Kim Min-jung	12 September 1996 (age 30)	29	0	(South Korea) Incheon Hyundai Steel Red Angels	2026 Asian Games
GK	Ryu Ji-soo	3 September 1997 (age 29)	5	0	(South Korea) Sejong Sportstoto	2026 Asian Games
GK	Woo Seo-bin	13 April 2004 (age 22)	3	0	(South Korea) Seoul WFC	v. Zambia, 18 April 2026
GK	Kang Ji-yeon	11 June 2001 (age 25)	0	0	(South Korea) Gangjin Swans	v. Zambia, 18 April 2026
DF	Jang Sel-gi	31 May 1994 (age 32)	121	19	(South Korea) Gyeongju KHNP	2026 Asian Games
DF	Jeong Yu-jin	25 December 2000 (age 25)	5	1	(South Korea) Incheon Hyundai Steel Red Angels	2026 Asian Games
DF	Kim Jin-hui	7 October 1998 (age 28)	13	0	(South Korea) Gyeongju KHNP	v. Guam, 3 June 2026 ^{INJ}
DF	Shin Na-yeong	9 October 1999 (age 27)	9	0	(United States) Brooklyn FC	v. Zambia, 18 April 2026
DF	Jo Min-ah	26 October 2000 (age 26)	5	0	(South Korea) Sejong Sportstoto	v. Zambia, 18 April 2026
DF	Seo Ye-jin	25 January 1996 (age 30)	3	0	(South Korea) Suwon FC	v. Zambia, 18 April 2026
DF	Kim Min-seo	23 November 2002 (age 23)	2	0	(South Korea) Incheon Hyundai Steel Red Angels	v. Zambia, 18 April 2026
DF	Choi Min-a	2 February 2003 (age 23)	1	0	(South Korea) Hwacheon KSPO	v. Zambia, 18 April 2026
DF	Kim Mi-yeon	21 March 1995 (age 31)	4	0	(South Korea) Sejong Sportstoto	v. Netherlands, 2 December 2025
MF	Hyun Seul-gi	28 January 2001 (age 25)	11	1	(South Korea) Gyeongju KHNP	2026 Asian Games
MF	Park Hye-jeong	30 March 2000 (age 26)	9	0	(South Korea) Incheon Hyundai Steel Red Angels	2026 Asian Games
MF	Park Ye-na	14 May 1999 (age 27)	4	0	(South Korea) Mungyeong Sangmu	2026 Asian Games
MF	Kang Tae-kyung	10 December 1998 (age 27)	2	0	(South Korea) Seoul WFC	2026 Asian Games
MF	Jung You-jin	10 October 2005 (age 21)	3	0	(South Korea) Gyeongju KHNP	v. Chinese Taipei, 9 June 2026
MF	Kim Ji-hyeon	27 July 2004 (age 22)	2	0	(South Korea) Sejong Sportstoto	v. Chinese Taipei, 9 June 2026
MF	Kim Ji-yun	8 June 2004 (age 22)	1	0	(South Korea) Sejong Sportstoto	v. Chinese Taipei, 9 June 2026
MF	Song Jae-eun	3 April 1997 (age 29)	5	0	(Turkey) Trabzonspor	v. Zambia, 18 April 2026
MF	Mun Eun-ju	1 September 2000 (age 26)	18	6	(South Korea) Hwacheon KSPO	2026 AFC Women's Asian Cup
MF	Lee Su-bin	26 December 1994 (age 31)	3	0	(South Korea) Hwacheon KSPO	v. Netherlands, 2 December 2025
FW	Son Hwa-yeon	15 March 1997 (age 29)	69	15	(South Korea) Gangjin Swans	2026 Asian Games
FW	Jeong Da-bin	5 September 2005 (age 21)	10	3	(Norway) Stabæk	2026 Asian Games
FW	Jang Yu-bin	10 February 2002 (age 24)	8	2	(South Korea) Seoul WFC	v. Chinese Taipei, 9 June 2026
FW	Kang Ji-woo	9 May 2000 (age 26)	6	0	(South Korea) Incheon Hyundai Steel Red Angels	v. Chinese Taipei, 9 June 2026
FW	Choi Yoo-jung	25 January 1992 (age 34)	8	1	(South Korea) Hwacheon KSPO	2026 AFC Women's Asian Cup
^{INJ} Withdrew due to injury^{RET} Retired from the national team^{PRE} Preliminary squad^{WD} Player withdrew from the squad due to non-injury issue.

== Records ==
As of 2 October 2026

Players in bold are still active with the national team.

=== Most appearances ===
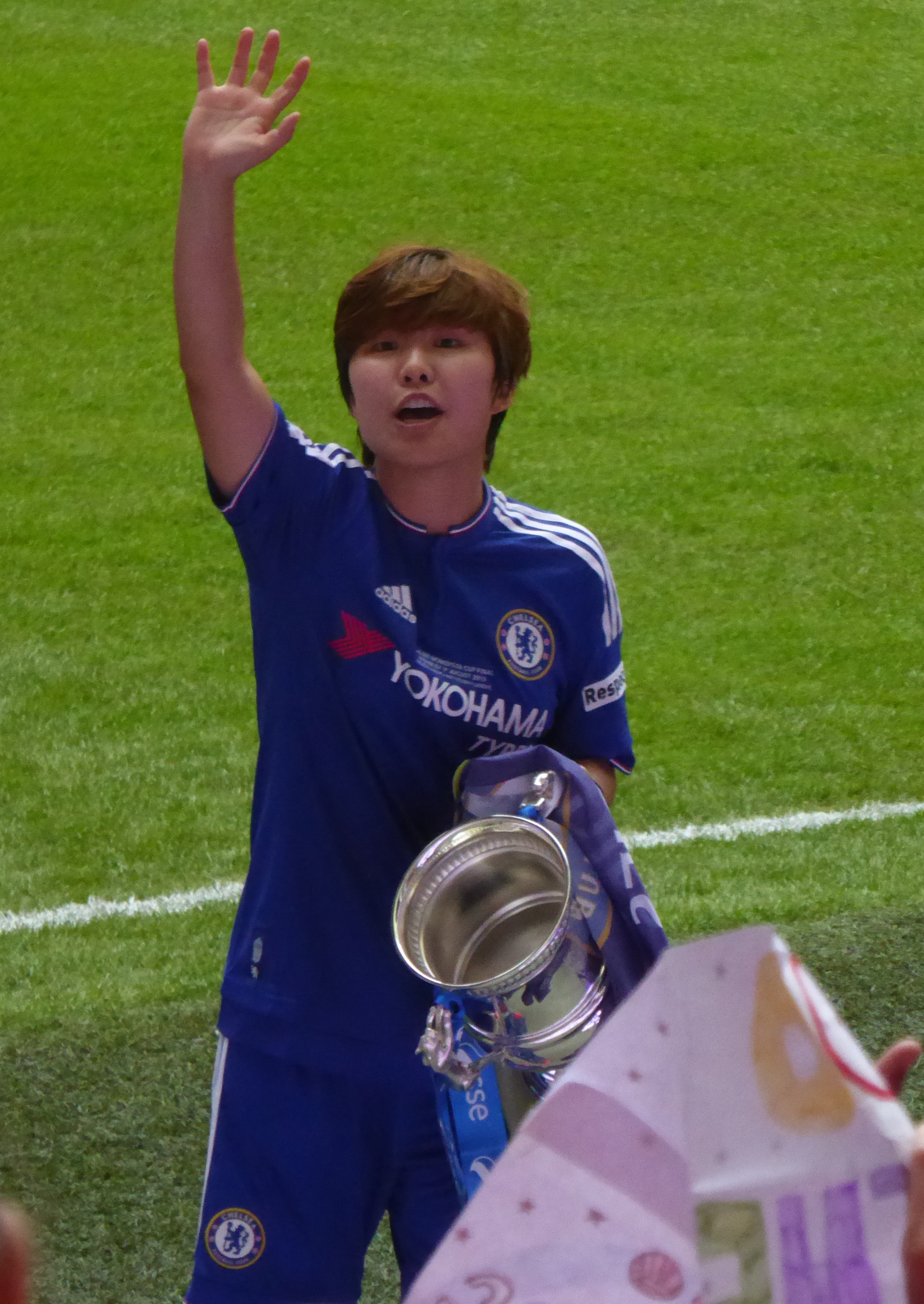
Ji So-yun is South Korea's most capped player and top goalscorer.

Rank	Player	Career	Caps	Goals
1	**Ji So-yun**	2006–present	182	76
2	**Cho So-hyun**	2007–present	156	26
3	**Kim Jung-mi**	2003–2024	152	0
4	**Kim Hye-ri**	2010–present	148	3
5	**Jang Sel-gi**	2013–present	121	19
6	**Lim Seon-joo**	2009–present	110	6
7	**Kwon Hah-nul**	2006–present	109	15
8	Jeon Ga-eul	2007–2019	102	38
9	**Lee Geum-min**	2013–present	101	27
10	Shim Seo-yeon	2008–2024	92	1

=== Top goalscorers ===
Rank	Player	Career	Goals	Caps	Avg.
1	**Ji So-yun**	2006–present	76	182	0.42
2	Jeon Ga-eul	2007–2019	38	102	0.37
3	Yoo Young-a	2007–2017	32	87	0.37
4	Cha Sung-mi	1994–2003	29	57	0.51
5	**Lee Geum-min**	2013–present	27	101	0.27
6	**Cho So-hyun**	2007–present	26	156	0.17
7	Park Hee-young	2005–2013	22	57	0.39
7	Jung Seol-bin	2006–2023	22	84	0.26
9	Park Eun-sun	2003–2023	20	49	0.41
10	**Moon Mi-ra**	2016–present	19	45	0.42
10	**Jang Sel-gi**	2013–present	19	121	0.16

== Competitive record ==
Champions Runners-up Third place Tournament played on home soil

=== FIFA Women's World Cup ===
FIFA Women's World Cup record									Qualification record					
Year	Round	Pld	W	D	L	GF	GA	Squad	Pld	W	D	L	GF	GA
(China) 1991	Did not qualify								Via AFC Women's Asian Cup					
(Sweden) 1995	Did not qualify								Via Asian Games					
(United States) 1999	Did not qualify								Via AFC Women's Asian Cup					
(United States) 2003	Group stage	3	0	0	3	1	11	Squad	Via AFC Women's Asian Cup					
(China) 2007	Did not qualify								Via AFC Women's Asian Cup					
(Germany) 2011	Did not qualify								Via AFC Women's Asian Cup					
(Canada) 2015	Round of 16	4	1	1	2	4	8	Squad	Via AFC Women's Asian Cup					
(France) 2019	Group stage	3	0	0	3	1	8	Squad	Via AFC Women's Asian Cup					
(Australia) (New Zealand) 2023	Group stage	3	0	1	2	1	4	Squad	Via AFC Women's Asian Cup					
(Brazil) 2027	Qualified								Via AFC Women's Asian Cup					
(Costa Rica) (Jamaica) (Mexico) (United States) 2031	To be determined								To be determined					
(United Kingdom) 2035	To be determined								To be determined					
Total	Round of 16	13	1	2	10	7	31	5/12	0	0	0	0	0	0

=== Summer Olympics ===
Summer Olympics record									Qualification record					
Year	Round	Pld	W	D	L	GF	GA	Squad	Pld	W	D	L	GF	GA
(United States) 1996	Did not qualify								Via FIFA Women's World Cup					
(Australia) 2000	Did not qualify								Via FIFA Women's World Cup					
(Greece) 2004	Did not qualify								5	2	0	3	15	9
(China) 2008	Did not qualify								10	4	3	3	18	15
(United Kingdom) 2012	Did not qualify								5	1	1	3	7	7
(Brazil) 2016	Did not qualify								5	1	2	2	6	5
(Japan) 2020	Did not qualify								4	2	1	1	13	4
(France) 2024	Did not qualify								3	1	2	0	11	2
(United States) 2028	To be determined								To be determined					
(Australia) 2032	To be determined								To be determined					
Total	—	0	0	0	0	0	0	0/8	32	11	9	12	70	42

=== AFC Women's Asian Cup ===
AFC Women's Asian Cup record									Qualification record					
Year	Round	Pld	W	D	L	GF	GA	Squad	Pld	W	D	L	GF	GA
(Hong Kong) 1975	Did not enter								Not held					
(Taiwan) 1977	Did not enter								Not held					
(India) 1979	Did not enter								Not held					
(Hong Kong) 1981	Did not enter								Not held					
1983	Did not enter								Not held					
(Hong Kong) 1986	Did not enter								Not held					
(Hong Kong) 1989	Did not enter								Not held					
(Japan) 1991	Group stage	3	0	0	3	0	22		Not held					
(Malaysia) 1993	Group stage	3	1	0	2	4	9		Not held					
(Malaysia) 1995	Fourth place	5	2	1	2	11	5		Not held					
(China) 1997	Group stage	2	1	0	1	11	1		Not held					
(Philippines) 1999	Group stage	4	3	0	1	30	5		Not held					
(Chinese Taipei) 2001	Fourth place	6	4	0	2	16	10		Not held					
2003	Third place	6	4	1	1	22	5		Not held					
(Australia) 2006	Group stage	4	2	0	2	14	6		Directly qualified					
(Vietnam) 2008	Group stage	3	2	0	1	5	3		3	3	0	0	22	0
(China) 2010	Group stage	3	1	1	1	6	3	Squad	Directly qualified					
(Vietnam) 2014	Fourth place	5	2	1	2	18	4	Squad	Directly qualified					
(Jordan) 2018	Fifth place	4	2	2	0	9	0	Squad	4	3	1	0	21	1
(India) 2022	Runners-up	6	4	1	1	11	4	Squad	2	2	0	0	16	0
(Australia) 2026	Semi-finals	5	3	1	1	16	7	Squad	Directly qualified					
(Uzbekistan) 2029	To be determined								To be determined					
Total	Runners-up	59	31	8	20	173	84	14/21	9	8	1	0	59	1

=== Asian Games ===
Asian Games record
Year	Round	Pld	W	D	L	GF	GA	Squad
(China) 1990	Fifth place	5	1	0	4	2	30	Squad
(Japan) 1994	Fourth place	3	0	0	3	0	9	Squad
1998	Group stage	3	1	1	1	8	4	Squad
(South Korea) 2002	Fourth place	5	2	0	3	6	8	Squad
(Qatar) 2006	Fourth place	5	2	0	3	7	10	Squad
(China) 2010	Bronze medalists	5	3	1	1	14	4	Squad
(South Korea) 2014	Bronze medalists	6	5	0	1	33	2	Squad
(Indonesia) 2018	Bronze medalists	6	5	0	1	32	3	Squad
(China) 2022	Quarter-finals	4	3	0	1	14	5	Squad
(Japan) 2026	Bronze medalists	6	4	1	1	19	6	Squad
(Qatar) 2030
(Saudi Arabia) 2034
Total	Bronze medalists	48	26	3	19	135	82	10/10

=== EAFF Championship ===
EAFF Championship record									Qualification record					
Year	Round	Pld	W	D	L	GF	GA	Squad	Pld	W	D	L	GF	GA
(South Korea) 2005	Champions	3	2	1	0	3	0		Not held					
(China) 2008	Fourth place	3	0	0	3	2	9		3	3	0	0	13	1
(Japan) 2010	Third place	3	1	0	2	6	4		4	4	0	0	41	0
(South Korea) 2013	Third place	3	1	0	2	4	5		Qualified as hosts					
(China) 2015	Runners-up	3	2	0	1	3	3	Squad	3	3	0	0	26	0
(Japan) 2017	Fourth place	3	0	0	3	3	7	Squad	3	3	0	0	36	0
(South Korea) 2019	Runners-up	3	1	1	1	3	1	Squad	Qualified as hosts					
(Japan) 2022	Third place	3	1	1	1	6	3		Not held					
(South Korea) 2025	Champions	3	1	2	0	5	3		Qualified as hosts					
Total	2 titles	27	9	5	13	35	35	9/9	13	13	0	0	116	1

=== Friendly competitions ===
Competition	Round	Pld	W	D	L	GF	GA
(South Korea) 2006 Peace Queen Cup	Group stage	3	0	0	3	2	6
(South Korea) 2008 Peace Queen Cup	Group stage	3	2	0	1	5	4
(South Korea) 2010 Peace Queen Cup	Champions	3	1	2	0	2	1
2011 Cyprus Women's Cup	Sixth place	4	2	1	1	6	5
2012 Cyprus Women's Cup	Fifth place	4	2	2	0	5	3
2013 Cyprus Women's Cup	Tenth place	4	2	1	1	5	1
2014 Cyprus Women's Cup	Third place	4	1	3	0	7	3
2015 Cyprus Women's Cup	Eleventh place	4	0	1	3	3	6
2017 Cyprus Women's Cup	Runners-up	4	2	1	1	4	1
(Portugal) 2018 Algarve Cup	Seventh place	3	1	1	1	4	5
(England) 2023 Arnold Clark Cup	Fourth place	3	0	0	3	2	8

== Honours ==
=== Continental ===
- AFC Women's Asian Cup

Runners-up: 2022
Third place: 2003

- Asian Games

Bronze medalists: 2010, 2014, 2018, 2026

=== Regional ===
- EAFF Championship

Champions: 2005, 2025
Runners-up: 2015, 2019
Third place: 2010, 2013, 2022

=== Friendly competitions ===
- Peace Queen Cup: 2010
- Pink Ladies Cup: 2025

== See also ==
- Women's football in South Korea
- Football in South Korea
- South Korea women's national under-20 football team
- South Korea women's national under-17 football team
- South Korea national football team

== Notes ==
Preceded by Inaugural champions	EAFF Championship; 2005 (first title)	Succeeded by 2008 Japan
