= Ayaka Nishikawa =

Japanese footballer

Personal information
- Date of birth: 2 April 1996 (age 30)
- Place of birth: Kanagawa Prefecture, Japan
- Height: 1.66 m (5 ft 5 in)
- Position: Defender

Team information
- Current team: Suwon FC
- Number: 5

Senior career*
Years	Team	Apps	(Gls)
2020–2022	INAC Kobe Leonessa		
2022–2024	Nippon TV Tokyo Verdy Beleza		
2024–	Suwon FC		
- * Club domestic league appearances and goals

Ayaka Nishikawa (西川彩香, Nishikawa Ayaka; pronounced [niɕikaɰa aʲaka]; born 2 April 1996) is a Japanese professional footballer who plays as a defender for WK League club Suwon FC.

== Club career ==
Nishikawa made her WE League debut on 12 September 2021.
