= Sae Kitakata =

Japanese footballer

Personal information
- Date of birth: 27 August 1998 (age 28)
- Place of birth: Tondabayashi, Japan
- Height: 1.59 m (5 ft 3 in)
- Position: Defender

Team information
- Current team: Nojima Stella
- Number: 6

Senior career*
Years	Team	Apps	(Gls)
	Nojima Stella	12	(0)
- * Club domestic league appearances and goals

Sae Kitakata (born 27 August 1998) is a Japanese professional footballer who plays as a defender for WE League club Nojima Stella.

== Club career ==
Kitakata made her WE League debut on 12 September 2021.
