= Sejong Sportstoto WFC =

South Korean women's football team

- Full name: Sejong Sportstoto Women's Football Club
- Founded: 16 March 2011; 15 years ago
- Ground: Sejong Civic Stadium
- Owner: Son Jun-cheol
- Manager: Yoon Deok-yeo
- League: WK League
- 2026: WK League, 6th of 8
- Website: sportstoto.co.kr
Home colours	Away colours

Sejong Sportstoto Women's Football Club (Korean: 세종 스포츠토토 여자 축구단) is a South Korean women's football team based in Sejong. The club competes in the WK League, the top division of women's football in South Korea, and plays its home games at Sejong Civic Stadium.

== History ==
The club was founded on 16 March 2011 as Chungbuk Sportstoto, under an agreement signed with North Chungcheong Province to be affiliated with the region for three years. The team was the eighth to join the WK League, playing their first match against Goyang Daekyo only five days after their official foundation. Ahead of the 2014 season, the team moved to Daejeon, changing its name to Daejeon Sportstoto. The club was renamed Gumi Sportstoto when they relocated to Gumi, North Gyeongsang on 29 January 2016. On 20 December 2019, the club moved again, this time to Sejong, becoming Sejong Sportstoto.

== Current squad ==
As of 6 March 2026

Note: Flags indicate national team as defined under FIFA eligibility rules; some limited exceptions apply. Players may hold more than one non-FIFA nationality.

No.	Pos.	Nation	Player
1	GK	KOR	Kim So-hee
3	DF	KOR	Kim Ji-yoon
4	DF	KOR	Kim Do-yeon (captain)
5	DF	KOR	Shin Dam-yeong (vice-captain)
6	DF	KOR	Kim Mi-yeon
7	MF	KOR	Ji Seon-mi
8	FW	KOR	Go Min-jeong
9	FW	KOR	Park Hee-young
10	MF	KOR	Lee Ha-rim
11	FW	KOR	Shin Hye-bin
13	MF	KOR	Yoon Min-ji
14	DF	KOR	Kim Yoon-joo
16	MF	KOR	Kim Ji-hyun

No.	Pos.	Nation	Player
17	MF	KOR	Oh Yeon-hee
18	GK	KOR	Ryu Ji-soo
19	MF	KOR	No Ha-neul
20	DF	KOR	Kim Hye-in
21	MF	KOR	Jang Jin-young
22	DF	KOR	Lee Jung-yeon
23	DF	KOR	Jo Min-ah (vice-captain)
24	DF	KOR	Yoon Sun-young
27	MF	KOR	Seo A-ri
29	FW	KOR	Lee Jung-in
30	DF	KOR	Kim Yoon-ju
33	GK	KOR	Kim Yu-mi

== Backroom staff ==
=== Coaching staff ===
- Manager: (South Korea) Yoon Deok-yeo
- Coach: (South Korea) Kang Min-jung
- Coach: (South Korea) Park Kyu-hong
- Coach: (South Korea) Sung Ki-hun

=== Support staff ===
- Club doctor: (South Korea) Lee Eun-mi

Source: Official website

== Honours ==
- National Women's Football Championship
  - Winners (2): 2017, 2018
  - Runners-up (4): 2013, 2015, 2019, 2024
- W Korea Cup
  - Runners-up (1): 2026

== Season-by-season records ==
Season	WK League regular season								Playoffs
Season	P	W	D	L	GF	GA	Pts	Pos.	Playoffs
2011	21	1	3	17	13	49	6	8th	Did not qualify
2012	21	7	5	9	31	43	26	4th	Did not qualify
2013	24	7	8	9	27	34	29	5th	Did not qualify
2014	24	8	8	8	32	31	32	4th	Did not qualify
2015	24	8	6	10	30	26	30	5th	Did not qualify
2016	24	10	6	8	31	27	36	3rd	Semifinal
2017	28	8	7	13	34	43	31	6th	Did not qualify
2018	28	15	3	10	49	38	48	4th	Did not qualify
2019	28	9	9	10	37	40	36	5th	Did not qualify
2020	21	6	3	12	27	41	21	6th	Did not qualify
2021	21	4	2	15	17	44	14	7th	Did not qualify
2022	21	2	3	16	18	45	9	8th	Did not qualify
2023	21	6	4	11	27	33	22	5th	Did not qualify
2024	28	9	11	8	31	30	38	5th	Did not qualify
2025	28	9	9	10	30	32	36	5th	Did not qualify
2026	28	10	6	12	27	34	36	6th	Did not qualify
