= 2025 WK League =

Korean association football league season

WK League
- Season: 2025
- Dates: 15 March – 2 October 2025
- Champions: Hwacheon KSPO (1st title)
- Runner up: Seoul City
- Champions League: Hwacheon KSPO
- Matches: 112
- Goals: 295 (2.63 per match)
- Top goalscorer: Moon Mi-ra (15 goals)
- Biggest home win: Gyeongju 5–0 Changnyeong; Mungyeong 5–0 Changnyeong
- Biggest away win: Mungyeong 0–4 Gyeongju; Suwon 0–4 Hwacheon
- Highest scoring: Mungyeong 5–2 Changnyeong; Suwon 2–5 Gyeongju
- (Note: All statistics do not include play-off matches)

The 2025 WK League was the 17th season of the WK League, the top division of women's football in South Korea. Each of the eight teams played every other side four times, twice at home and twice away, totalling 28 matches per club in the regular season. The regular season began on 15 March 2025. After the regular season, the second and third-placed teams contested a one-legged semi-playoff, with the winner facing the top-ranked side in a two-legged final.

Suwon FC were the defending champions after beating Hwacheon KSPO in the 2024 championship final. Hwacheon KSPO won the 2025 title, beating Seoul City 7–5 on aggregate in the final.

== Teams ==
=== Stadiums and locations ===
Locations of the 2025 WK League teams

The following eight teams competed in the 2025 WK League.

Team	Location	Stadium	Capacity	Position in 2024
Changnyeong WFC	Changnyeong	Changnyeong Sports Park	876	8th
Gyeongju KHNP	Gyeongju	Gyeongju Football Park Pitch 3	650	3rd
Hwacheon KSPO	Hwacheon	Hwacheon Sports Park	604	2nd
Incheon Hyundai Steel Red Angels	Incheon	Incheon Namdong Asiad	4,968	4th
Mungyeong Sangmu	Mungyeong	Mungyeong Civic Stadium	4,959	7th
Sejong Sportstoto	Sejong	Sejong Civic Stadium	996	5th
Seoul City	Seoul	Seoul World Cup Stadium Auxiliary Field	1,012	6th
Suwon FC	Suwon	Suwon Sports Complex	11,808	1st

=== Managerial changes ===
Team	Outgoing manager	Manner of departure	Date of vacancy	Replaced by	Date of appointment
Incheon Hyundai Steel Red Angels	Kim Eun-sook	Resigned	5 November 2024	Hur Jeong-jae	27 November 2024
Hwacheon KSPO	Kang Jae-soon	Appointed as director	30 December 2024	Kang Sun-mi	1 January 2025

== Players ==
=== WK League draft ===
The 2025 WK League draft took place on December 12, 2024 at the Olympic Parktel in Seoul, with 24 of 50 participants receiving a contract from one of the seven participating teams. Midfielder Kim Myeong-jin of Korea University was the first player to be selected in the draft, signing to Incheon Hyundai Steel Red Angels.

The following new players were signed in the 2025 WK League draft:

Round of draft	Incheon Hyundai	Changnyeong WFC	Seoul WFC	Gyeongju KHNP WFC	Hwacheon KSPO	Suwon FC Women	Sejong Sportstoto
First round	Kim Myeong-jin	Do Yoon-ji	Woo Seo-bin	Kang Eun-yeong	Cheon Se-hwa	Lee Soo-in	Kim Ji-hyun (1)
Second round	Bae Ye-bin		Seo Hyun-min	Um Min-gyeong	Choi Min-a	Kim Ga-yeon	Jang Jin-yeong
Third round					Hong Yoo-jin		
Fourth round							
Additional signings		Kim Ji-hyun (2)	Park Hyun-jin	Kang Ji-yeon	Cho Ye-jin	Hwang A-hyun	
Additional signings		Hwang Hye-min		Oh Seo-yeon			
Additional signings		Park Ga-hyun	Kim Eun-mi				
Additional signings		Hong Seong-yeon					

=== Foreign players ===
The total number of foreign players is limited to only three per team. As a military team, Mungyeong Sangmu can not recruit any foreign players.

Club	Player 1	Player 2	Player 3	Departed mid-season
Changnyeong WFC	(Japan) Sae Kitakata			
Gyeongju KHNP	(Brazil) Bruna Pelé	(Japan) Mai Kyokawa	(Japan) Emi Nakajima	
Hwacheon KSPO	(Japan) Nonaka Hana	(Japan) Asuna Tanaka		
Incheon Hyundai Steel Red Angels	(Japan) Yuka Toriumi	(Japan) Haruhi Suzuki		
Sejong Sportstoto				(United States) Eva Vlassopoulos
Seoul City				
Suwon FC	(Japan) Ayaka Nishikawa	(Brazil) Mileninha	(Japan) Rena Okutsu	(United States) Megan Callahan Root

== Regular season ==
=== League table ===
Pos	Team	Pld	W	D	L	GF	GA	GD	Pts	Qualification
1	Hwacheon KSPO	28	16	9	3	56	23	+33	57	Qualification for Championship
2	Seoul City	28	15	9	4	48	28	+20	54	Qualification for Play-off
3	Incheon Hyundai Steel Red Angels	28	13	9	6	35	26	+9	48	Qualification for Play-off
4	Gyeongju KHNP	28	12	7	9	47	38	+9	43	
5	Sejong Sportstoto	28	9	9	10	30	32	−2	36	
6	Mungyeong Sangmu	28	8	8	12	35	37	−2	32	
7	Suwon FC	28	5	9	14	27	45	−18	24	
8	Changnyeong WFC	28	2	4	22	17	66	−49	10	

Source: Soccerway

== Results ==
=== Matches 1–14 ===
Home \ Away	CHA	GYE	HWA	INC	MUN	SEJ	SEO	SUW
Changnyeong WFC	—	1–3	0–2	0–1	2–1	0–2	0–0	0–3
Gyeongju KHNP	5–0	—	2–2	1–0	2–0	1–0	1–4	2–2
Hwacheon KSPO	3–1	2–0	—	3–1	1–1	2–0	1–1	1–1
Incheon Hyundai Steel Red Angels	3–0	2–1	1–0	—	1–0	0–0	1–1	0–0
Mungyeong Sangmu	5–2	0–4	0–1	0–0	—	1–2	2–1	2–1
Sejong Sportstoto	2–0	1–1	0–0	0–0	1–4	—	0–1	3–0
Seoul City	4–1	1–2	1–1	2–1	3–0	1–1	—	3–2
Suwon FC	2–1	1–2	0–3	2–2	0–1	0–0	1–3	—

Source: Soccerway Flashscore
Legend: Blue = home team win; Yellow = draw; Red = away team win.

=== Matches 15–28 ===
Home \ Away	CHA	GYE	HWA	INC	MUN	SEJ	SEO	SUW
Changnyeong WFC	—	1–1	1–5	1–2	0–0	1–1	0–1	1–0
Gyeongju KHNP	3–0	—	0–2	0–1	0–3	3–3	0–2	0–0
Hwacheon KSPO	7–3	0–1	—	3–1	1–1	2–1	2–0	2–1
Incheon Hyundai Steel Red Angels	1–0	3–0	1–3	—	3–1	2–1	1–2	0–0
Mungyeong Sangmu	5–0	2–2	1–0	1–1	—	0–1	2–2	0–0
Sejong Sportstoto	1–0	1–4	1–1	1–2	2–1	—	2–1	3–1
Seoul City	2–1	2–1	2–2	1–1	2–0	2–0	—	1–1
Suwon FC	1–0	2–5	0–4	2–3	2–1	1–3	1–0	—

Source: Soccerway Flashscore
Legend: Blue = home team win; Yellow = draw; Red = away team win.

== Championship play-offs ==
Under WK League rules, a draw in the play-off was considered a win for the team with the higher regular-season ranking.

=== Bracket ===
Play-off (semi-final)			Championship (finals)
			1	Hwacheon KSPO	3	4	7
2	Seoul City	0		Seoul City	2	3	5
3	Incheon Hyundai Steel Red Angels	0

=== Play-off ===
1 November 2025
14:00 UTC+9

Seoul City	0–0	Incheon Hyundai Steel Red Angels
	Report

Seoul World Cup Stadium Auxiliary Field, Seoul
Attendance: 800

=== Championship ===
8 November 2025
14:00 UTC+9

Seoul City	2–3	Hwacheon KSPO
Shin Bo-mi 61'; Kim Mi-yeon 64'	Report	Wi Jae-eun 10'; Choi Yoo-jung 14'; Lee Soo-bin 37'

Seoul World Cup Stadium Auxiliary Field, Seoul
15 November 2025
14:00 UTC+9

Hwacheon KSPO	4–3	Seoul City
Lee Soo-bin 6'; Choi Yoo-jung 9', 20'; Wi Jae-eun 69'	Report	Shin Bo-mi 88'; Kim Mi-yeon 90+2'; Han Chae-rin 90+4'

Hwacheon Sports Park, Hwacheon

Hwacheon KSPO won 7–5 on aggregate.

=== Final table ===
Pos	Team	Qualification
1	Hwacheon KSPO (C)	Qualification for Champions League
2	Seoul City	
3	Incheon Hyundai Steel Red Angels	

(C) Champions
