= Seoul City Hall WFC =

South Korean women's football club

Seoul City Hall
- Full name: Seoul City Hall Amazones Women's Football Club 서울 시청 아마조네스 여자 축구단
- Founded: 2004; 22 years ago
- Ground: Seoul World Cup Auxiliary Stadium
- Capacity: 1,012
- Owner: Seoul Metropolitan Government
- Manager: Yoo Young-sil
- League: WK League
- 2026: WK League, 5th of 8
- Website: seoulsports.or.kr
| Home colours | Away colours |

Seoul City Amazones Women's Football Club (Korean: 서울 시청 아마조네스 여자 축구단), also known as Seoul City Hall WFC, is a South Korean women's football club based in Seoul. The club competes in the WK League, the top division of women's football in South Korea, and plays its home games at the auxiliary pitch of the Seoul World Cup Stadium.

== History ==
In 2003, the Seoul Metropolitan Government announced its plans to establish a professional men's football club and a women's works football club the following year. Seoul City Hall WFC was formally founded in February 2004 with a squad of 22 players, including nine members of the South Korean national women's team at the time. The club's first manager was Seo Jung-ho. The club won its first tournament in September 2004, beating INI Steel and Daekyo Kangaroos to the top spot in the league-format Unification Cup. The club was one of the founding members of the WK League in 2009.

Seoul was at the centre of a controversy in 2013 when representatives of the other six clubs in the WK League claimed that striker Park Eun-sun was male and threatened to boycott the league if Park did not undergo a gender verification test. The club stood by Park, accusing their rivals of violating her human rights and suggesting the allegations were merely a ploy to gain a competitive advantage by keeping Park out of the league, who had scored 19 goals in 22 games. Although the National Human Rights Commission advised the Korea Football Association to punish the coaches of the other teams, neither the KFA nor the WK League acted on the recommendations, and as a result, Park left Seoul to join FC Rossiyanka.

== Current squad ==
As of 10 April 2026

Note: Flags indicate national team as defined under FIFA eligibility rules; some limited exceptions apply. Players may hold more than one non-FIFA nationality.

| No. | Pos. | Nation | Player |
|---|---|---|---|
| 2 | DF | KOR | Bin Hyun-jin |
| 3 | MF | KOR | Lee Yoo-jung |
| 7 | FW | KOR | Han Chae-rin |
| 8 | MF | KOR | Lee Yoo-jung |
| 9 | FW | KOR | Kang Tae-gyeong (captain) |
| 10 | FW | KOR | Seo Hyun-min |
| 11 | FW | KOR | Choi Ji-na |
| 12 | DF | KOR | Baek Do-hye |
| 13 | DF | KOR | Kim Young-eun |
| 14 | DF | KOR | Kim Min-ji (vice-captain) |
| 15 | FW | KOR | Kang Yu-mi |

| No. | Pos. | Nation | Player |
|---|---|---|---|
| 16 | DF | KOR | Jo Ye-song |
| 17 | DF | KOR | Lee Ye-eun |
| 18 | GK | KOR | Kim Jung-mi |
| 19 | DF | KOR | Kang Ye-jin |
| 20 | DF | KOR | Shin Bo-mi |
| 21 | GK | KOR | Woo Seo-bin |
| 22 | DF | KOR | Jeong Hyun-gyeong |
| 23 | DF | KOR | Choi Jung-yoon |
| 26 | DF | KOR | Lim Seon-joo |
| 27 | DF | KOR | Lee Chae-yun |

== Coaching staff ==
- Manager: (South Korea) Yoo Young-sil
- Coaches: (South Korea) Yoon Sung-hwi, (South Korea) Yoo Young-a, (South Korea) Ahn Tae-hwa
- Playing coach: (South Korea) Lee Yoo-jung
- Medical trainer: (South Korea) Yang Yoon-mi

Source: Official website

== Honours ==
- WK League
  - Runners-up (2): 2013, 2025
- National Women's Football Championship
  - Winners (2): 2014, 2023
  - Runners-up (3): 2006, 2010, 2012
- Unification Cup
  - Winners (1): 2004

== Season-by-season records ==
| Season | WK League regular season | | | | | | | | Playoffs |
| Season | P | W | D | L | GF | GA | Pts | Pos. | Playoffs |
|---|---|---|---|---|---|---|---|---|---|
| 2009 | 20 | 8 | 5 | 7 | 27 | 25 | 29 | 3rd | Did not qualify |
| 2010 | 20 | 7 | 2 | 11 | 23 | 32 | 23 | 4th | Did not qualify |
| 2011 | 21 | 5 | 9 | 7 | 19 | 26 | 24 | 6th | Did not qualify |
| 2012 | 21 | 5 | 9 | 7 | 26 | 29 | 24 | 5th | Did not qualify |
| 2013 | 24 | 11 | 7 | 6 | 34 | 26 | 40 | 2nd | Runners-up |
| 2014 | 24 | 10 | 6 | 8 | 29 | 29 | 36 | 3rd | Semifinal |
| 2015 | 24 | 3 | 6 | 15 | 28 | 61 | 15 | 6th | Did not qualify |
| 2016 | 24 | 7 | 5 | 12 | 33 | 48 | 26 | 5th | Did not qualify |
| 2017 | 28 | 12 | 5 | 11 | 40 | 43 | 41 | 4th | Did not qualify |
| 2018 | 28 | 4 | 9 | 15 | 34 | 57 | 21 | 6th | Did not qualify |
| 2019 | 28 | 3 | 6 | 19 | 26 | 63 | 15 | 7th | Did not qualify |
| 2020 | 21 | 3 | 4 | 14 | 20 | 49 | 13 | 7th | Did not qualify |
| 2021 | 21 | 9 | 3 | 9 | 28 | 44 | 30 | 4th | Did not qualify |
| 2022 | 21 | 6 | 4 | 11 | 32 | 43 | 22 | 5th | Did not qualify |
| 2023 | 21 | 4 | 7 | 10 | 22 | 38 | 19 | 7th | Did not qualify |
| 2024 | 28 | 6 | 9 | 13 | 33 | 44 | 27 | 6th | Did not qualify |
| 2025 | 28 | 15 | 9 | 4 | 48 | 28 | 54 | 2nd | Runners-up |
| 2026 | 28 | 11 | 4 | 13 | 25 | 38 | 37 | 5th | Did not qualify |

== See also ==
- Seoul FC
- Football in Seoul
