= Football at the 2026 Asian Games – Women's team squads =

The following is a list of squads for each nation competing in women's football at the 2026 Asian Games in Aichi and Nagoya, Japan. Each nation submitted a squad of 22 players.

== Group E ==
=== Japan ===
The following players list is the Japan squad for the 2026 Asian Games.

Head Coach: Michihisa Kano (狩野 倫久)

No.	Pos.	Player	Date of birth (age)	Caps	Goals	Club
1	GK	Natsumi Asano (浅野 菜摘)	14 April 1997 (age 29)	1	0	(Japan Football Association) Chifure AS Elfen Saitama
12	GK	Shiori Fukuda (福田 史織)	13 June 2002 (age 24)	0	0	(Japan Football Association) Urawa Reds
23	GK	Shū Ohba (大場 朱羽)	11 July 2002 (age 24)	1	0	(Scottish Football Association) Rangers
2	DF	Sumire Suzuki (鈴木 菫)	24 January 2004 (age 22)	0	0	(Japan Football Association) JEF United Chiba
3	DF	Sakurako Ōhashi (大箸 桜子)	8 April 2004 (age 22)	0	0	(Japan Football Association) Toyo University
4	DF	Wakaba Gotō (後藤 若葉)	4 June 2001 (age 25)	0	0	(Japan Football Association) Urawa Reds
5	DF	Yūki Seno (瀬野 有希)	30 December 1996 (age 29)	0	0	(Japan Football Association) Chifure AS Elfen Saitama
13	DF	Ai Kuwahara (桑原 藍)	18 August 2004 (age 22)	0	0	(Japan Football Association) INAC Kobe Leonessa
19	DF	Fukina Mizuno (水野 蕗奈)	31 January 2001 (age 25)	0	0	(Japan Football Association) INAC Kobe Leonessa
6	MF	Fūna Yanase (柳瀬 楓菜)	6 June 2002 (age 24)	0	0	(Japan Football Association) Sanfrecce Hiroshima Regina
8	MF	Kotono Sakakibara (榊原 琴乃)	11 October 2004 (age 22)	0	0	(Japan Football Association) Urawa Reds
10	MF	Yui Narumiya (成宮 唯) (captain)	22 February 1995 (age 31)	14	5	(Japan Football Association) INAC Kobe Leonessa
14	MF	Yuzuho Shiokoshi (塩越 柚歩)	1 November 1997 (age 29)	8	2	(Japan Football Association) Tokyo Verdy Beleza
15	MF	Juri Ito (伊東 珠梨)	2 October 2002 (age 24)	2	0	(Japan Football Association) Nojima Stella Kanagawa Sagamihara
17	MF	Saori Takarada (宝田 沙織)	27 December 1999 (age 26)	24	1	(Japan Football Association) Cerezo Osaka
18	MF	Hikaru Yūmura (祐村 ひかる)	18 October 1997 (age 29)	0	0	(Japan Football Association) Nojima Stella Kanagawa Sagamihara
22	MF	Yoshino Nakashima (中嶋 淑乃)	27 July 1999 (age 27)	11	2	(Japan Football Association) Sanfrecce Hiroshima Regina
7	FW	Megu Hamada (浜田 芽来)	27 December 2000 (age 25)	1	0	(Japan Football Association) RB Omiya Ardija
9	FW	Mami Ueno (上野 真実)	27 September 1996 (age 30)	15	1	(Japan Football Association) Sanfrecce Hiroshima Regina
11	FW	Chiina Kamiya (神谷 千菜)	29 March 2001 (age 25)	0	0	(Japan Football Association) Sanfrecce Hiroshima Regina
16	FW	Nanasa Ikuta (生田 七彩)	14 September 2003 (age 23)	0	0	(Japan Football Association) Chifure AS Elfen Saitama
20	FW	Ai Tsujisawa (辻澤 亜唯)	17 December 2005 (age 20)	0	0	(Japan Football Association) INAC Kobe Leonessa
21	FW	Hanon Nishio (西尾 葉音)	27 April 2003 (age 23)	0	0	(Japan Football Association) RB Omiya Ardija

=== Chinese Taipei ===
The following players list is the Chinese Taipei squad for the 2026 Asian Games.

Head Coach: (Belgium) Patrick De Wilde

No.	Pos.	Player	Date of birth (age)	Club
1	GK	Wang Yu-ting	27 May 2001 (age 25)	(Chinese Taipei Football Association) Hang Yuan
18	GK	Cheng Ssu-yu	25 September 1989 (age 37)	(Chinese Taipei Football Association) Hualien
23	GK	Liu Ying-chia	1 September 2005 (age 21)	(United States Soccer Federation) Eastern Kentucky Colonels
2	DF	Chang Chi-lan	18 September 1996 (age 30)	(Chinese Taipei Football Association) Kaohsiung Attackers
3	DF	Pan Shin-yu	3 May 1997 (age 29)	(Chinese Taipei Football Association) Kaohsiung Attackers
4	DF	Lin Jing-xuan	11 May 2005 (age 21)	(Chinese Taipei Football Association) Taichung Blue Whale
7	DF	Minori Wakabayashi	1 June 1993 (age 33)	(Chinese Taipei Football Association) Kaohsiung Attackers
20	DF	Chen Ying-hui	5 October 1998 (age 28)	(Chinese Taipei Football Association) Taichung Blue Whale
22	DF	Huang Ke-sin	18 July 2003 (age 23)	(Chinese Taipei Football Association) Taichung Blue Whale
6	MF	Chuan Tzu-yu	4 November 2008 (age 18)	(Chinese Taipei Football Association) Taipei Bravo
8	MF	Maho Tanaka	4 March 2001 (age 25)	(Chinese Taipei Football Association) Taichung Blue Whale
9	MF	Hsu Yi-yun	29 April 1997 (age 29)	(Chinese Taipei Football Association) AC Taipei
10	MF	Saki Matsunaga	26 December 1995 (age 30)	(Chinese Taipei Football Association) Hang Yuan
13	MF	Pan Yen-hsin	18 February 1996 (age 30)	(Chinese Taipei Football Association) Hang Yuan
14	MF	Wu Kai-ching	14 November 1999 (age 26)	(Chinese Taipei Football Association) Kaohsiung Attackers
15	MF	Tseng Yun-ching	14 February 2000 (age 26)	(Chinese Taipei Football Association) AC Taipei
5	FW	Liao Jie-ning	24 September 2008 (age 18)	(Chinese Taipei Football Association) Meimei
11	FW	He Jia-shiuan	7 May 2005 (age 21)	(Chinese Taipei Football Association) Hang Yuan
12	FW	Lin Hsin-hui	6 February 2002 (age 24)	(Chinese Football Association) Guangxi Pingguo
16	FW	Liu Yu-chiao	14 December 2005 (age 20)	(Chinese Taipei Football Association) Hang Yuan
17	FW	Chen Jin-wen	13 June 2003 (age 23)	(Chinese Taipei Football Association) Taichung Blue Whale
19	FW	Su Yu-hsuan	21 February 2001 (age 25)	(Chinese Football Association) Hangzhou WFC
21	FW	Chen Yu-chin	5 August 2007 (age 19)	(Chinese Taipei Football Association) Hang Yuan

=== Vietnam ===
The following players list is the Vietnam squad for the 2026 Asian Games.

Head coach: Hoàng Văn Phúc

No.	Pos.	Player	Date of birth (age)	Caps	Goals	Club
1	GK	Lê Thị Thu	1 August 2007 (age 19)	0	0	(Vietnam Football Federation) Phong Phu Ha Nam
2	DF	Lương Thị Thu Thương	1 May 2000 (age 26)	42	0	(Vietnam Football Federation) Than KSVN
4	DF	Ngô Thị Hồng Nhung	5 September 2000 (age 26)	0	0	(Vietnam Football Federation) Ho Chi Minh City
5	DF	Hoàng Thị Loan	6 February 1995 (age 31)	45	3	(Vietnam Football Federation) Hanoi
6	DF	Nguyễn Thị Hoa	28 November 2000 (age 25)	9	0	(Vietnam Football Federation) Hanoi
7	FW	Ngọc Minh Chuyên	23 June 2004 (age 22)	10	1	(Vietnam Football Federation) Thai Nguyen T&T
8	MF	Nguyễn Thị Trúc Hương	4 March 2000 (age 26)	18	1	(Vietnam Football Federation) Than KSVN
10	FW	Lưu Hoàng Vân	9 April 2006 (age 20)	0	0	(Vietnam Football Federation) Phong Phu Ha Nam
11	MF	Thái Thị Thảo	12 February 1995 (age 31)	67	18	(Vietnam Football Federation) Hanoi
12	FW	Phạm Hải Yến (captain)	9 November 1994 (age 32)	100	57	(Vietnam Football Federation) Hanoi
13	DF	Lê Thị Diễm My	6 March 1994 (age 32)	38	0	(Vietnam Football Federation) Than KSVN
14	GK	Trần Thị Kim Thanh	18 September 1993 (age 33)	68	0	(Vietnam Football Federation) Ho Chi Minh City
15	MF	Vũ Thị Hoa	6 November 2003 (age 23)	8	0	(Vietnam Football Federation) Hanoi
16	MF	Dương Thị Vân	20 September 1994 (age 32)	60	3	(Vietnam Football Federation) Thai Nguyen T&T
17	MF	Trần Thị Thu Xuân	21 December 2002 (age 23)	1	0	(Vietnam Football Federation) Ho Chi Minh City
18	DF	Cù Thị Huỳnh Như	7 August 2000 (age 26)	7	0	(Vietnam Football Federation) Ho Chi Minh City
19	DF	Nguyễn Thị Thanh Nhã	25 September 2001 (age 25)	47	7	(Vietnam Football Federation) Hanoi
20	GK	Khổng Thị Hằng	10 October 1993 (age 33)	36	0	(Vietnam Football Federation) Thai Nguyen T&T
21	MF	Ngân Thị Vạn Sự	29 April 2001 (age 25)	52	14	(Vietnam Football Federation) Hanoi
23	MF	Nguyễn Thị Bích Thùy	1 May 1994 (age 32)	90	25	(Vietnam Football Federation) Thai Nguyen T&T
24	FW	Nguyễn Thị Thúy Hằng	19 November 1997 (age 28)	24	6	(Vietnam Football Federation) Thai Nguyen T&T
25	DF	Nguyễn Thị Tuyết Ngân	10 February 2000 (age 26)	9	1	(Vietnam Football Federation) Ho Chi Minh City
26	DF	Trần Thị Thu Phương	1 February 2002 (age 24)	0	0	(Vietnam Football Federation) Than KSVN

=== Thailand ===
The following players list is the Thailand squad for the 2026 Asian Games.

Head Coach: Natipong Sritong-In

No.	Pos.	Player	Date of birth (age)	Club
1	GK	Chonticha Panyarung	30 December 2008 (age 17)	(Football Association of Thailand) Khon Kaen Sports School
18	GK	Thichanan Sodchuen	1 February 2003 (age 23)	(Football Association of Thailand) BGC–College of Asian Scholars
22	GK	Chotmanee Thongmongkol	12 January 1999 (age 27)	(Chinese Taipei Football Association) Taichung Blue Whale
2	DF	U-raiporn Yongkul	17 August 1998 (age 28)	(Football Association of Thailand) BGC–College of Asian Scholars
3	DF	Phonphirun Philawan	8 April 1999 (age 27)	(Football Association of Thailand) BGC–College of Asian Scholars
4	DF	Panittha Jeeratanapavibul	15 November 2001 (age 24)	(Chinese Football Association) Guangxi Pingguo
5	DF	Natcha Kaewanta	3 December 2006 (age 19)	(Football Association of Thailand) Chonburi
6	DF	Supapron Intaraprasit	18 February 2004 (age 22)	(Football Association of Thailand) Chonburi
11	DF	Chatchawan Rodthong	22 June 2002 (age 24)	(Football Association of Thailand) Bangkok
16	DF	Krittiya Munrang	5 March 2003 (age 23)	(Football Association of Thailand) BGC–College of Asian Scholars
19	DF	Pitsamai Sornsai	19 January 1989 (age 37)	(Chinese Taipei Football Association) Taichung Blue Whale
7	MF	Khwanjira Ngok-Wong	22 December 2003 (age 22)	(Football Association of Thailand) BGC–College of Asian Scholars
8	MF	Pluemjai Sontisawat	20 July 2003 (age 23)	(Football Association of Thailand) Chonburi
12	MF	Sangrawee Meekham	27 February 1997 (age 29)	(Football Association of Thailand) BGC–College of Asian Scholars
13	MF	Achiraya Yingsakul	13 December 2007 (age 18)	(Football Association of Thailand) Bangkok
21	MF	Rinyaphat Moondong	19 June 2007 (age 19)	(Football Association of Thailand) Chonburi
9	FW	Jiraporn Mongkoldee	13 August 1998 (age 28)	(Chinese Football Association) Guangxi Pingguo
10	FW	Kanyanat Chetthabutr	24 September 1999 (age 27)	(Football Association of Thailand) BGC–College of Asian Scholars
14	FW	Saowalak Pengngam	30 November 1996 (age 29)	(Chinese Taipei Football Association) Taichung Blue Whale
15	FW	Karnjanathat Phomsri	17 January 2003 (age 23)	(Football Association of Thailand) Kasem Bundit University
17	FW	Taneekarn Dangda	15 December 1992 (age 33)	(Football Association of Thailand) Bangkok
20	FW	Wirunya Kwenkasikum	7 July 2005 (age 21)	(Football Association of Thailand) Chonburi
23	FW	Janista Jinantuya	9 September 2003 (age 23)	(Football Association of Thailand) Bangkok

== Group F ==
=== South Korea ===
The following players list is the South Korea squad for the 2026 Asian Games.

Head Coach: Shin Sang-woo .

No.	Pos.	Player	Date of birth (age)	Caps	Goals	Club
1	GK	Kim Kyeong-hee (김경희)	17 March 2003 (age 23)	3	0	(Korea Football Association) Suwon FC
12	GK	Ryu Ji-soo (류지수)	3 September 1997 (age 29)	5	0	(Korea Football Association) Sejong Sportstoto
21	GK	Kim Min-jung (김민정)	12 September 1996 (age 30)	24	0	(Korea Football Association) Incheon Hyundai Steel Red Angels
2	DF	Han Da-in (한다인)	9 February 2002 (age 24)	2	0	(Korea Football Association) Suwon FC
3	DF	Lee Min-hwa (이민화)	29 October 1999 (age 27)	8	0	(Korea Football Association) Hwacheon KSPO
4	DF	Noh Jin-young (노진영)	3 June 2000 (age 26)	13	0	(Korea Football Association) Gyeongju KHNP
5	DF	Ko Yoo-jin (고유진) (captain)	24 January 1997 (age 29)	13	3	(Korea Football Association) Incheon Hyundai Steel Red Angels
15	DF	Jeong Yu-jin (정유진)	25 December 2000 (age 25)	2	1	(Korea Football Association) Incheon Hyundai Steel Red Angels
16	DF	Jang Sel-gi (장슬기)	31 May 1994 (age 32)	115	18	(Korea Football Association) Gyeongju KHNP
20	DF	Kim Hye-ri (김혜리)	25 June 1990 (age 36)	142	3	(Korea Football Association) Suwon FC
22	DF	Choo Hyo-joo (추효주)	29 July 2000 (age 26)	65	6	(Canadian Soccer Association) Ottawa Rapid
6	MF	Park Hye-jeong (박혜정)	30 March 2000 (age 26)	8	0	(Korea Football Association) Incheon Hyundai Steel Red Angels
8	MF	Park Ye-na (박예나)	14 May 1999 (age 27)	2	0	(Korea Football Association) Mungyeong Sangmu
10	MF	Ji So-yun (지소연)	21 February 1991 (age 35)	176	75	(Korea Football Association) Suwon FC
11	MF	Choe Yu-ri (최유리)	16 September 1994 (age 32)	73	14	(Korea Football Association) Suwon FC
13	MF	Hyun Seul-gi (현슬기)	28 January 2001 (age 25)	6	0	(Korea Football Association) Gyeongju KHNP
14	MF	Jung Min-young (정민영)	28 September 2000 (age 26)	12	1	(Canadian Soccer Association) Ottawa Rapid
17	MF	Yun Su-jeong (윤수정)	20 June 2002 (age 24)	2	2	(Korea Football Association) Suwon FC
18	MF	Kim Min-ji (김민지)	21 August 2003 (age 23)	10	1	(Korea Football Association) Seoul WFC
19	MF	Kang Tae-kyung (강태경)	10 December 1998 (age 27)	0	0	(Korea Football Association) Seoul WFC
23	MF	Kang Chae-rim (강채림)	23 March 1998 (age 28)	51	10	(Korea Football Association) Gangjin Swans
7	FW	Son Hwa-yeon (손화연)	15 March 1997 (age 29)	65	15	(Korea Football Association) Gangjin Swans
9	FW	Jeong Da-bin (정다빈)	5 September 2005 (age 21)	7	2	(Norwegian Football Federation) Stabæk

=== North Korea ===
The following players list is the North Korea squad for the 2026 Asian Games.

Head Coach: Pak Song-jin

No.	Pos.	Player	Date of birth (age)	Caps	Goals	Club
1	GK	Pak Ju-mi	1 July 2003 (age 23)	8	0	(DPR Korea Football Association) Naegohyang
2	DF	Ri Myong-gum	1 January 2003 (age 23)	21	2	(DPR Korea Football Association) Naegohyang
3	DF	Ri Kum-hyang	22 April 2001 (age 25)	16	2	(DPR Korea Football Association) Naegohyang
4	DF	Oh Sol-song	30 June 2004 (age 22)	0	0	(DPR Korea Football Association) Sobaeksu
5	DF	An Kuk-hyang (captain)	25 May 2001 (age 25)	11	0	(DPR Korea Football Association) April 25
6	MF	An Pok-yong	10 January 2002 (age 24)	5	0	(DPR Korea Football Association) Naegohyang
7	MF	Myong Yu-jong	29 August 2003 (age 23)	25	15	(DPR Korea Football Association) April 25
8	FW	Ri Song-a	22 June 1999 (age 27)	3	0	(Japan Football Association) Sanfrecce Hiroshima Regina
9	MF	Kim Song-gyong	12 February 2005 (age 21)	11	3	(DPR Korea Football Association) Amnokgang
10	FW	Jong Kum	1 June 2004 (age 22)	0	0	(DPR Korea Football Association) Naegohyang
11	FW	Han Jin-hong	16 February 2002 (age 24)	18	9	(DPR Korea Football Association) April 25
12	MF	Hong Song-ok	21 August 2003 (age 23)	25	12	(DPR Korea Football Association) Amnokgang
13	MF	Jon Ryong-jong	25 July 2004 (age 22)	6	0	(DPR Korea Football Association) April 25
14	DF	Hwang Yu-yong	13 April 2006 (age 20)	9	0	(DPR Korea Football Association) Amnokgang
15	FW	Choe Il-son	1 January 2007 (age 19)	4	0	(DPR Korea Football Association) April 25
16	DF	Song Chun-sim	29 May 2002 (age 24)	9	3	(DPR Korea Football Association) Pyongyang
17	FW	Kim Kyong-yong	2 January 2002 (age 24)	23	30	(DPR Korea Football Association) Naegohyang
18	GK	Yu Son-gum	8 November 2003 (age 23)	14	0	(DPR Korea Football Association) Sobaeksu
19	MF	Choe Kum-ok	23 February 2002 (age 24)	4	0	(DPR Korea Football Association) Naegohyang
20	MF	Chae Un-yong	12 April 2004 (age 22)	9	3	(DPR Korea Football Association) Wolmido
21	GK	Chae Un-gyong	29 November 2004 (age 21)	0	0	(DPR Korea Football Association) Pyongyang
22	MF	Kim Hye-yong	11 March 2003 (age 23)	15	9	(DPR Korea Football Association) Naegohyang
23	DF	Ri Hye-gyong	24 September 1999 (age 27)	24	1	(DPR Korea Football Association) Amnokgang

=== Bangladesh ===
The following players list is the Bangladesh squad for the 2026 Asian Games.

Head Coach: (England) Peter Butler

No.	Pos.	Player	Date of birth (age)	Caps	Goals	Club
	GK	Rupna Chakma	2 January 2004 (age 22)	39	0	(Bangladesh Football Federation) Rajshahi Stars
	GK	Swarna Rani Mandal	6 June 2006 (age 20)	2	0	(Bangladesh Football Federation) Rajshahi Stars
	GK	Mile Akter	14 September 2006 (age 20)	8	0	(Bangladesh Football Federation) Bangladesh Army
	DF	Sheuli Azim	20 December 2001 (age 24)	51	1	(Bangladesh Football Federation) Rajshahi Stars
	DF	Shamsunnahar Sr.	31 January 2003 (age 23)	54	0	(Bangladesh Football Federation) Farashganj SC
	DF	Afeida Khandaker	18 November 2006 (age 19)	30	4	(Bangladesh Football Federation) Rajshahi Stars
	DF	Kohati Kisku	5 September 2005 (age 21)	23	2	(Bangladesh Football Federation) Bangladesh Police
	DF	Mst Surovi Akter Arfin	5 June 2008 (age 18)	4	0	(Bangladesh Football Federation) Bangladesh Army
	DF	Arpita Biswas	7 May 2009 (age 17)	0	0	(Bangladesh Football Federation) Bangladesh Army
	DF	Unnoti Khatun	30 December 2005 (age 20)	1	0	(Bangladesh Football Federation) Bangladesh Army
	DF	Surma Jannat	1 January 2006 (age 20)	1	0	(Bangladesh Football Federation) Bangladesh Police
	MF	Maria Manda (C)	10 May 2003 (age 23)	53	1	(Bangladesh Football Federation) Farashganj SC
	MF	Monika Chakma	15 September 2003 (age 23)	45	4	(Bangladesh Football Federation) Farashganj SC
	MF	Momita Khatun	1 December 2009 (age 16)	4	0	(Bangladesh Football Federation) Bangladesh Army
	MF	Anika Rania Siddiqui	25 May 2005 (age 21)	7	1	(Swedish Football Association) Djursholm
	MF	Halima Akther	6 April 2005 (age 21)	6	0	(Bangladesh Football Federation) Bangladesh Army
	FW	Tohura Khatun	5 May 2003 (age 23)	40	15	(Bangladesh Football Federation) Farashganj SC
	FW	Umehla Marma	14 August 2007 (age 19)	11	1	(Bangladesh Football Federation) Ansar & VDP
	FW	Sauravi Akanda Prity	31 December 2009 (age 16)	7	1	(Bangladesh Football Federation) Rajshahi Stars
	FW	Ritu Porna Chakma	30 December 2003 (age 22)	42	15	(Myanmar Football Federation) Ayeyawady
	FW	Shaheda Akter Ripa	8 December 2005 (age 20)	24	1	(Bangladesh Football Federation) Rajshahi Stars
	FW	Mst Sagorika	1 December 2007 (age 18)	17	5	(Bangladesh Football Federation) Bangladesh Police
	FW	Shamsunnahar Jr.	30 March 2004 (age 22)	38	8	(Bangladesh Football Federation) Farashganj SC

=== Myanmar ===
The following players list is the Myanmar squad for the 2026 Asian Games.

Head Coach: (England) Colin Bell

No.	Pos.	Player	Date of birth (age)	Club
1	GK	Ei Sandar Zaw	15 February 2000 (age 26)	(Myanmar Football Federation) ISPE
18	GK	Zu Latt Nadi	22 December 2000 (age 25)	(Myanmar Football Federation) ISPE
22	GK	Myo Mya Mya Nyein	22 August 1999 (age 27)	(Myanmar Football Federation) Thitsar Arman
2	DF	May Thet Mon Myint	1 January 2004 (age 22)	(Myanmar Football Federation) Thitsar Arman
3	DF	Yu Yu Naing	29 November 2007 (age 18)	(Myanmar Football Federation) Yangon United
4	DF	Zune Yu Ya Oo	12 February 2001 (age 25)	(Myanmar Football Federation) Ayeyawady
5	DF	Phyu Phyu Win	1 December 2004 (age 21)	(Myanmar Football Federation) Ayeyawady
11	DF	Yu Per Khine	31 January 1996 (age 30)	(Myanmar Football Federation) Shan United
14	DF	Lin Lae Oo	6 September 2002 (age 24)	(Myanmar Football Federation) ISPE
17	DF	Than Than Nwe	5 August 2001 (age 25)	(Myanmar Football Federation) ISPE
21	DF	Zune Thae Oo	24 November 2002 (age 23)	(Myanmar Football Federation) Shan United
23	DF	Khin Myo Thandar Tun	22 February 2004 (age 22)	(Myanmar Football Federation) Shan United
6	MF	Naw Htet Htet Wai	30 July 2000 (age 26)	(Myanmar Football Federation) Ayeyawady
10	MF	Khin Marlar Tun	21 May 1988 (age 38)	(Myanmar Football Federation) ISPE
12	MF	Win Theingi Tun	1 February 1995 (age 31)	(Myanmar Football Federation) Thitsar Arman
15	MF	Zin Mar Htwe	5 May 2003 (age 23)	(Myanmar Football Federation) Thitsar Arman
16	MF	Lin Myint Mo	9 June 2002 (age 24)	(Myanmar Football Federation) ISPE
19	MF	Shwe Yee Tun	14 May 2003 (age 23)	(Myanmar Football Federation) ISPE
20	MF	Daisy Aung	9 June 2006 (age 20)	(Myanmar Football Federation) Yangon United
7	FW	Win Win Tun	12 February 2003 (age 23)	(Myanmar Football Federation) Yadanarbon
8	FW	Myat Noe Khin	24 July 2003 (age 23)	(Myanmar Football Federation) Thitsar Arman
9	FW	Su Su Kyi	30 May 2006 (age 20)	(Myanmar Football Federation) Yangon United
13	FW	May Htet Lu	28 January 2003 (age 23)	(Myanmar Football Federation) Ayeyawady

== Group G ==
=== China ===
The following players list is the China squad for the 2026 Asian Games.

Head Coach: (Australia) Ante Milicic

No.	Pos.	Player	Date of birth (age)	Club
1	GK	Pan Hongyan	30 December 2004 (age 21)	(Chinese Football Association) Beijing
12	GK	Xiao Zitong	27 March 2002 (age 24)	(Chinese Football Association) Shanghai
22	GK	Zhu Mengdi	25 January 2000 (age 26)	(Chinese Football Association) Shanxi
2	DF	Yu Fan	4 July 2000 (age 26)	(Chinese Football Association) Beijing
3	DF	Chen Qiaozhu	8 September 1999 (age 27)	(Chinese Football Association) Beijing
4	DF	Si Yu	18 March 2000 (age 26)	(Chinese Football Association) Beijing
5	DF	Wu Haiyan	26 February 1993 (age 33)	(Chinese Football Association) Wuhan
8	DF	Yao Wei	1 September 1997 (age 29)	(Chinese Football Association) Wuhan
13	DF	Wang Ying	18 November 1997 (age 28)	(Chinese Football Association) Guangdong
20	DF	Zhang Chengxue	2 December 1995 (age 30)	(Chinese Football Association) Sichuan
7	MF	Wang Shuang	23 January 1995 (age 31)	(Chinese Football Association) Wuhan
10	MF	Wang Yanwen	27 March 1999 (age 27)	(Chinese Football Association) Beijing
14	MF	Li Qingtong	14 April 1999 (age 27)	(Chinese Football Association) Beijing
15	MF	Wang Aifang	15 January 2006 (age 20)	(Chinese Football Association) Liaoning
16	MF	Liu Jing	28 April 1998 (age 28)	(Chinese Football Association) Changchun
18	MF	Zhang Rui	17 January 1989 (age 37)	(Chinese Football Association) Shandong
19	MF	Zhang Linyan	16 January 2001 (age 25)	(Chinese Football Association) Beijing
21	MF	Sun Fangxin	6 July 2003 (age 23)	(Chinese Football Association) Guangxi
6	FW	Yuan Cong	17 April 2000 (age 26)	(Chinese Football Association) Guangdong
9	FW	Wurigumula	26 August 1996 (age 30)	(Chinese Football Association) Sichuan
11	FW	Zhou Xinyu	26 February 2002 (age 24)	(Chinese Football Association) Liaoning
17	FW	Xie Zongmei	26 April 2006 (age 20)	(Chinese Football Association) Liaoning
23	FW	Shao Ziqin	24 February 2003 (age 23)	(Portuguese Football Federation) Benfica

=== Philippines ===
The following players list is the Philippines squad for the 2026 Asian Games.

Head Coach: (Australia) Mark Torcaso

No.	Pos.	Player	Date of birth (age)	Club
1	GK	Olivia McDaniel	14 October 1997 (age 29)	Free agent
18	GK	Nina Meollo	23 June 2004 (age 22)	Free agent
22	GK	Leah Bradley	7 April 2009 (age 17)	(United States Soccer Federation) Liberty Lady Flames
2	DF	Reina Bonta	17 April 1999 (age 27)	Free agent
3	DF	Azumi Oka	21 April 2006 (age 20)	(United States Soccer Federation) UNCG Spartans
5	DF	Hali Long	21 January 1995 (age 31)	(Football Association of Thailand) BGC–College of Asian Scholars
12	DF	Kaya Hawkinson	17 April 2000 (age 26)	Free agent
13	DF	Janly Fontamillas	24 January 2000 (age 26)	(Philippine Football Federation) Kaya–Iloilo
14	DF	Jourdyn Curran	11 May 2003 (age 23)	(United States Soccer Federation) Salmon Bay
16	DF	Sofia Wunsch	16 February 1999 (age 27)	Free agent
17	DF	Aiselyn Sia	23 February 2009 (age 17)	(United States Soccer Federation) Illinois Fighting Illini
4	MF	Charisa Lemoran	21 September 1998 (age 28)	(Philippine Football Federation) Kaya–Iloilo
6	MF	Jaclyn Sawicki	14 November 1992 (age 33)	(Canadian Soccer Association) Calgary Wild
7	MF	Natalie Collins	28 May 2007 (age 19)	(United States Soccer Federation) Boise State Broncos
8	MF	Skye Leach	8 October 2003 (age 23)	(Football Australia) Melbourne Victory
9	MF	Carleigh Frilles	11 April 2002 (age 24)	(United States Soccer Federation) DC Power
15	MF	Isabella Pasion	14 July 2006 (age 20)	Free agent
19	MF	Alessandrea Carpio	4 April 2002 (age 24)	(Philippine Football Federation) Kaya–Iloilo
20	MF	Camryn Penn	15 October 2004 (age 22)	(United States Soccer Federation) Cal Poly Mustangs
21	MF	Katrina Guillou	19 December 1993 (age 32)	(United States Soccer Federation) DC Power
23	MF	Megan Murray	23 November 2005 (age 20)	(United States Soccer Federation) Marquette Golden Eagles
10	FW	Mallie Ramirez	1 September 2004 (age 22)	Free agent
11	FW	Dionesa Tolentin	25 June 2000 (age 26)	(Philippine Football Federation) Kaya–Iloilo

=== Uzbekistan ===
The following players list is the Uzbekistan squad for the 2026 Asian Games.

Head Coach: (Lithuania) Kotryna Kulbytė

No.	Pos.	Player	Date of birth (age)	Club
1	GK	Maftuna Jonimqulova	26 July 1999 (age 27)	(Uzbekistan Football Association) Nasaf
12	GK	Kumushoy Gulomova	6 November 1999 (age 27)	(Uzbekistan Football Association) Qizilqum
13	GK	Zarina Saidova	19 September 2001 (age 25)	(Uzbekistan Football Association) Nasaf
2	DF	Madina Khikmatova	9 August 2001 (age 25)	(Uzbekistan Football Association) Nasaf
3	DF	Kholida Dadaboeva	12 April 1993 (age 33)	(Uzbekistan Football Association) Qizilqum
4	DF	Rukhshona Usarova	26 July 2007 (age 19)	(Uzbekistan Football Association) Sogdiyona
6	DF	Shodiya Tosheva	14 May 1997 (age 29)	(Uzbekistan Football Association) Nasaf
11	DF	Maftuna Shoyimova	1 January 1999 (age 27)	(Uzbekistan Football Association) Nasaf
15	DF	Umida Zoirova	22 April 1998 (age 28)	(Uzbekistan Football Association) Nasaf
21	DF	Leyla Oraniyazova	18 October 2004 (age 22)	(Uzbekistan Football Association) AGMK
22	DF	Sevinch Kuchkorova	28 September 2004 (age 22)	(Uzbekistan Football Association) AGMK
5	MF	Rukhshona Olimjonova	1 January 2007 (age 19)	(Uzbekistan Football Association) AGMK
8	MF	Ilvina Ablyakimova	27 April 1995 (age 31)	(Uzbekistan Football Association) Nasaf
16	MF	Zarina Mamatkarimova	4 March 2004 (age 22)	(Uzbekistan Football Association) Nasaf
19	MF	Nozimakhon Ergasheva	23 January 2001 (age 25)	(Uzbekistan Football Association) AGMK
20	MF	Mehribon Egamberdieva	9 October 2007 (age 19)	(Uzbekistan Football Association) Nasaf
7	FW	Nilufar Kudratova	5 June 1997 (age 29)	(Uzbekistan Football Association) Nasaf
9	FW	Dildora Nozimova	3 November 1997 (age 29)	(Uzbekistan Football Association) Qizilqum
10	FW	Diyorakhon Khabibullaeva	15 September 1999 (age 27)	(Uzbekistan Football Association) Nasaf
14	FW	Oydinoy Turgunova	15 March 2006 (age 20)	(Uzbekistan Football Association) AGMK
17	FW	Lyudmila Karachik	8 December 1994 (age 31)	(Uzbekistan Football Association) Nasaf
18	FW	Shahnoza Dekanbaeva	18 January 2008 (age 18)	(Uzbekistan Football Association) Lokomotiv Tashkent
23	FW	Diyora Bakhtiyarova	29 August 2007 (age 19)	(Uzbekistan Football Association) Bunyodkor

=== Hong Kong ===
The following players list is the Hong Kong squad for the 2026 Asian Games.

Head Coach: (Brazil) José Ricardo Rambo

No.	Pos.	Player	Date of birth (age)	Club
1	GK	Ng Cheuk Wai	19 March 1997 (age 29)	(Football Association of Hong Kong, China) TSL
18	GK	Lee Yi Yan	15 October 2006 (age 20)	(Football Association of Hong Kong, China) Shatin
19	GK	Li Sze Ying	29 March 2007 (age 19)	(Football Association of Hong Kong, China) Citizen
2	DF	Chu Sin Kwan	24 September 2004 (age 22)	(Football Association of Hong Kong, China) Shatin
3	DF	Ma Chak Shun	2 March 1996 (age 30)	(Football Association of Hong Kong, China) TSL
4	DF	Chu So Kwan	3 March 2004 (age 22)	(Football Association of Hong Kong, China) Kitchee
5	DF	Chan Tsz Shan	19 January 2005 (age 21)	(Football Association of Hong Kong, China) TSL
12	DF	Wei Lan	21 May 2006 (age 20)	(Football Association of Hong Kong, China) Citizen
13	DF	Lai Mae Halasan Tsang	11 September 2001 (age 25)	(Football Association of Hong Kong, China) TSL
21	DF	Wu Choi Yiu	10 September 2004 (age 22)	(Football Association of Hong Kong, China) TSL
6	MF	Tsang Pak Tung	28 October 2003 (age 23)	(Canadian Soccer Association) Langley United
7	MF	Chan Wing Lam	30 July 2003 (age 23)	(Football Association of Hong Kong, China) TSL
8	MF	Fu Chiu Man	2 June 1998 (age 28)	(Football Association of Hong Kong, China) Kitchee
10	MF	Wai Yuen Ting	15 October 1992 (age 34)	(Football Association of Hong Kong, China) Shatin
11	MF	Kwan Wing Yu	6 August 2003 (age 23)	(Football Association of Hong Kong, China) Citizen
14	MF	Karri Chan	11 January 2005 (age 21)	(The Football Association) Blackburn Rovers
15	MF	Sharon Fung	16 July 1999 (age 27)	(Football Association of Hong Kong, China) TSL
16	MF	Sean Luk	9 January 2004 (age 22)	(United States Soccer Federation) MIT Engineers
20	MF	Lucia Ko Pak-ling	25 October 2007 (age 19)	(The Football Association) Derby County
22	MF	Anke Leung Hong-kiu	29 September 2006 (age 20)	(Football Association of Hong Kong, China) TSL
23	MF	Chan Yee Hing	29 March 2004 (age 22)	(Football Association of Hong Kong, China) TSL
9	FW	Li Hau Yi	22 November 2006 (age 19)	(Football Association of Hong Kong, China) Citizen
17	FW	Cheung Wai Ki	22 November 1990 (age 35)	(Football Association of Hong Kong, China) Kitchee
