= Football at the 2026 Asian Games =

Event details
- Games: 2026 Asian Games
- Host country: Japan
- Dates: 14 September – 3 October 2026
- Venues: 7 (in 6 host cities)
- Competitors: TBA from 18 nations

Men's tournament
- Teams: 15 (from 1 confederation)
Medalists
Gold	South Korea
Silver	Japan
Bronze	China

Women's tournament
- Teams: 12 (from 1 confederation)
Medalists
Gold	Japan
Silver	North Korea
Bronze	South Korea

Editions
- ← 2022 2030 →

The Football tournament at the 2026 Asian Games was held between 14 September and 3 October 2026 in several cities across both Chūbu and Kansai regions. In this tournament, fifteen teams participated in men's competition and twelve teams participated in women's competition.

South Korea were the men's defending champions, and successfully defended the title beating Japan in the final. Japan were the women's defending champions, and successfully defended the title beating North Korea in the final on penalties.

== Competition schedule ==
The schedule is as follows:

G	Group stage	1/4	Quarter-finals	1/2	Semi-finals	B	Bronze medal match	F	Gold medal match

Date Event	Mon 14	Tue 15	Wed 16	Thu 17	Fri 18	Sat 19	Sun 20	Mon 21	Tue 22	Wed 23	Thu 24	Fri 25	Sat 26	Sun 27	Mon 28	Tue 29	Wed 30	Thu 1	Fri 2		Sat 3	
Men	—N/a	G		—N/a	G	—N/a	G	—N/a	G		—N/a	1/4		—N/a			1/2	—N/a			B	F
Women	G	—N/a		G	—N/a			G	—N/a			1/4	—N/a			1/2	—N/a		B	F	—N/a	

== Venues ==
A total of seven venues around six cities is used.

Eleven venues were chosen for the bid after Aichi-Nagoya was selected, including Toyota, Nagoya, Kariya, Oita, Utsunomiya, Yokohama, Hiroshima, Suita, Saitama, Chiba and Chōfu. Those venues where shortlisted to Toyota, Nagoya, Kariya, Gifu, Shizuoka, Kyoto, Osaka and Kobe, then later excluded Kyoto and Kobe on 30 April 2025. Notably, none of the stadiums used in the 2020 Olympics and 2012 FIFA U-20 Women's World Cup is used in this tournament, and the Shizuoka Stadium with Nagai Stadium are the only stadiums in this tournament that were used in the 2002 FIFA World Cup.

The Toyota Stadium hosts the men's finals, while Shizuoka Stadium hosts the women's finals.

Fukuroi	Osaka	Toyota	Gifu
Shizuoka Stadium	Nagai Stadium	Toyota Stadium	Gifu Nagaragawa Stadium
Capacity: 50,889	Capacity: 47,853	Capacity: 45,000	Capacity: 26,109
Nagoya	Football at the 2026 Asian Games is located in Central Japan		
Paloma Mizuho Rugby Stadium	Football at the 2026 Asian Games is located in Central Japan		
Capacity: 10,400	Football at the 2026 Asian Games is located in Central Japan		
Nagoya	Football at the 2026 Asian Games is located in Central Japan		
CS Asset Minato Soccer Stadium	Football at the 2026 Asian Games is located in Central Japan		
Capacity: 6,700	Football at the 2026 Asian Games is located in Central Japan		
Kariya	Football at the 2026 Asian Games is located in Central Japan		
Wave Stadium Kariya	Football at the 2026 Asian Games is located in Central Japan		
Capacity: 2,602	Football at the 2026 Asian Games is located in Central Japan		

These host cities host the following matches:

- Fukuroi
  - Women's – 6 group stage, 2 quarter-finals, 2 semi-finals, bronze medal match and gold medal match
- Osaka
  - Men's – 2 semi-final matches
  - Women's – 6 group stage, 2 quarter-final matches
- Toyota
  - Men's – 6 group stage, 2 quarter-finals, bronze medal match and gold medal match
- Gifu
  - Women's – 5 group stage matches
- Nagoya, Rugby Stadium
  - Men's – 4 group stage, 2 quarter-final matches
- Nagoya, Soccer Stadium
  - Men's – 5 group stage matches
- Kariya
  - Men's – 6 group stage matches
  - Women's – 1 group stage match

== Qualification ==
In the previous editions, participating nations were free to enter teams in the football tournament of the Asian Games. For the 2026 Asian Games, a qualification criteria was set up with the participating teams of the 2026 AFC U-23 Asian Cup qualifying for the men's tournament, and the teams of the 2026 AFC Women's Asian Cup qualifying for the women's tournament (both with the exception of Australia due to not being a member of the OCA). On 12 March 2026, it was confirmed that Hong Kong's both men's team and women's team would participate in the tournament. On 29 June 2026, it was confirmed that the Philippines would participate in the men's tournament. On 10 July 2026, Indian media The Times of India reported the final men's and women's participating teams; according to the list, in the men's tournament, Jordan, Lebanon and Syria would no longer participate, and were replaced by Kuwait and North Korea. In the women's tournament India and Iran would no longer participate, and were replaced by Myanmar and Thailand. They also stated that the women's tournament will be held not by 16 teams but by 12 teams. On 19 July 2026, 4 days before the draw, it was reported that Iraq had withdrawn from the men's tournament, and its spot would not be filled by another team.

The draw for the tournaments were held on 23 July 2026.

Nation	Men's	Women's
Bangladesh	—N/a	Yes
China	Yes	Yes
Chinese Taipei	—N/a	Yes
Hong Kong	Yes	Yes
Iran	Yes	—N/a
Japan	Yes	Yes
Kuwait	Yes	—N/a
Kyrgyzstan	Yes	—N/a
Myanmar	—N/a	Yes
North Korea	Yes	Yes
Philippines	Yes	Yes
Qatar	Yes	—N/a
Saudi Arabia	Yes	—N/a
South Korea	Yes	Yes
Thailand	Yes	Yes
United Arab Emirates	Yes	—N/a
Uzbekistan	Yes	Yes
Vietnam	Yes	Yes
Total: 18 NOCs	15/15	12/12

== Participating teams ==
=== Men's tournament ===
Group A	Group B	Group C	Group D
1. Japan (hosts); 2. Thailand; 3. Kyrgyzstan; 4. Hong Kong	5. China; 6. United Arab Emirates; 7. Iran; 8. North Korea	9. Vietnam; 10. Uzbekistan; 11. Philippines; 12. Kuwait	13. South Korea; 14. Saudi Arabia; 15. Qatar

=== Women's tournament ===
Group E	Group F	Group G
1. Japan (hosts); 2. Chinese Taipei; 3. Vietnam; 4. Thailand	5. South Korea; 6. North Korea; 7. Bangladesh; 8. Myanmar	9. China; 10. Philippines; 11. Uzbekistan; 12. Hong Kong

== Men's tournament ==
=== Group stage ===
15 teams were divided into four groups. Top two teams from each group advance to the quarter-finals.

==== Group A ====
Pos	Team	Pld	W	D	L	GF	GA	GD	Pts	Qualification
1	Japan (H)	3	3	0	0	12	0	+12	9	Advance to knockout stage
2	Thailand	3	2	0	1	8	6	+2	6	Advance to knockout stage
3	Kyrgyzstan	3	1	0	2	6	10	−4	3	
4	Hong Kong	3	0	0	3	1	11	−10	0	

Source: Aichi–Nagoya 26
(H) Hosts

==== Group B ====
Pos	Team	Pld	W	D	L	GF	GA	GD	Pts	Qualification
1	China	3	1	2	0	2	1	+1	5	Advance to knockout stage
2	North Korea	3	1	1	1	5	3	+2	4	Advance to knockout stage
3	Iran	3	1	1	1	4	5	−1	4	
4	United Arab Emirates	3	0	2	1	1	3	−2	2	

Source: Aichi–Nagoya 26

==== Group C ====
Pos	Team	Pld	W	D	L	GF	GA	GD	Pts	Qualification
1	Uzbekistan	3	3	0	0	9	1	+8	9	Advance to knockout stage
2	Vietnam	3	1	1	1	3	3	0	4	Advance to knockout stage
3	Philippines	3	1	0	2	3	8	−5	3	
4	Kuwait	3	0	1	2	2	5	−3	1	

Source: Aichi–Nagoya 26

==== Group D ====
Pos	Team	Pld	W	D	L	GF	GA	GD	Pts	Qualification
1	South Korea	2	2	0	0	6	1	+5	6	Advance to knockout stage
2	Saudi Arabia	2	1	0	1	2	2	0	3	Advance to knockout stage
3	Qatar	2	0	0	2	1	6	−5	0	

Source: Aichi–Nagoya 26

=== Medal round ===
Quarter-finals
25 September – Nagoya
South Korea	4
Vietnam	0
26 September – Toyota
China	3
Thailand	0
25 September – Nagoya
Uzbekistan	3
Saudi Arabia	0
26 September – Toyota
Japan	1
North Korea	0

Semi-finals
30 September – Osaka
South Korea	2
China	1
30 September – Osaka
Uzbekistan	1 (8)
Japan (p)	1 (9)

Gold medal match
3 October – Toyota
South Korea	1
Japan	0
Bronze medal match
3 October – Toyota
China	2 (4)
Uzbekistan	2 (3)

== Women's tournament ==
=== Group stage ===
12 teams were divided into three groups. Top two teams from each group along with two best third-placed teams advance to the quarter-finals.

==== Group E ====
Pos	Team	Pld	W	D	L	GF	GA	GD	Pts	Qualification
1	Japan (H)	3	3	0	0	20	0	+20	9	Advance to knockout stage
2	Chinese Taipei	3	2	0	1	3	5	−2	6	Advance to knockout stage
3	Vietnam	3	0	1	2	1	10	−9	1	Advance to knockout stage
4	Thailand	3	0	1	2	0	9	−9	1	

Source: Aichi–Nagoya 26
(H) Hosts

==== Group F ====
Pos	Team	Pld	W	D	L	GF	GA	GD	Pts	Qualification
1	North Korea	3	2	1	0	19	1	+18	7	Advance to knockout stage
2	South Korea	3	2	1	0	12	1	+11	7	Advance to knockout stage
3	Myanmar	3	0	1	2	0	13	−13	1	
4	Bangladesh	3	0	1	2	0	16	−16	1	

Source: Aichi–Nagoya 26

==== Group G ====
Pos	Team	Pld	W	D	L	GF	GA	GD	Pts	Qualification
1	China	3	2	1	0	11	3	+8	7	Advance to knockout stage
2	Uzbekistan	3	1	2	0	4	3	+1	5	Advance to knockout stage
3	Philippines	3	1	1	1	4	6	−2	4	Advance to knockout stage
4	Hong Kong	3	0	0	3	2	9	−7	0	

Source: Aichi–Nagoya 26

==== Ranking of third-placed teams ====
Pos	Grp	Team	Pld	W	D	L	GF	GA	GD	Pts	Qualification
1	G	Philippines	3	1	1	1	4	6	−2	4	Advance to knockout stage
2	E	Vietnam	3	0	1	2	1	10	−9	1	Advance to knockout stage
3	F	Myanmar	3	0	1	2	0	13	−13	1	

Source: Aichi–Nagoya 26

=== Medal round ===
Quarter-finals
25 September – Fukuroi
North Korea	5
Chinese Taipei	1
25 September – Osaka
China (a.e.t.)	1
Vietnam	0
25 September – Fukuroi
Japan	4
Philippines	0
25 September – Osaka
South Korea	6
Uzbekistan	3

Semi-finals
29 September – Fukuroi
North Korea	2
China	0
29 September – Fukuroi
Japan	2
South Korea	0

Gold medal match
2 October – Fukuroi
North Korea	2 (3)
Japan (p)	2 (5)
Bronze medal match
2 October – Fukuroi
China	0
South Korea	1

== Medal summary ==
=== Medal table ===
* Host nation (Japan)

Rank	Nation	Gold	Silver	Bronze	Total
1	Japan*	1	1	0	2
2	South Korea	1	0	1	2
3	North Korea	0	1	0	1
4	China	0	0	1	1
Totals (4 entries)		2	2	2	6

=== Medalists ===
Event	Gold	Silver	Bronze
Men's tournament	South Korea; Kim Joon-hong; Choi Woo-jin; Kim Ji-soo; Eom Ji-sung; Lee Young-jun; Yang Hyun-jun; Kang Sang-yoon; Hwang Do-yun; Yang Min-hyeok; Park Seung-soo; Lee Seung-hwan; Shin Min-ha; Kang Min-jun; Park Seong-hoon; Lee Gi-hyuk; Lee Seung-won; Bae Jun-ho; Kim Min-seung; Lee Hyun-ju; Choi Seok-hyun; Kim Myung-jun; Park Gyeong-seop; Bae Hyun-seo	Japan; Alexandre Pisano; Rei Umeki; Keita Kosugi; Kaito Tsuchiya; Rion Ichihara; Shuto Nagano; Nelson Ishiwatari; Kenshin Yasuda; Yutaka Michiwaki; Hisatsugu Ishii; Yumeki Yokoyama; Masataka Kobayashi; Shusuke Furuya; Yuto Ozeki; Soichiro Mori; Yuya Fukunaga; Yotaro Nakajima; Yudai Shimamoto; Uche BS Nwadike; Sena Ishibashi; Mihiro Sato; Tariqkani Hayato Okabe; Rui Araki	China; Yu Jinyong; Hu Hetao; Liu Haofan; Shi Songchen; Zhu Chenjie; Xu Bin; Xiang Yuwang; Li Xinxiang; Zhang Yuning; Wang Yudong; Kuai Jiwen; Yao Haoyang; Mutalifu Yimingkari; Yimulan Maimaiti; Wu Xi; Li Hao; He Yiran; Chen Zeshi; Baihelamu Abuduwaili; Yang Haoyu; Peng Xiao; Mao Weijie; Yang Xi
Women's tournament	Japan; Natsumi Asano; Shiori Fukuda; Shū Ohba; Sumire Suzuki; Sakurako Ōhashi; Wakaba Gotō; Yūki Seno; Ai Kuwahara; Fukina Mizuno; Fūna Yanase; Kotono Sakakibara; Yui Narumiya; Yuzuho Shiokoshi; Juri Ito; Saori Takarada; Hikaru Yūmura; Yoshino Nakashima; Megu Hamada; Mami Ueno; Chiina Kamiya; Nanasa Ikuta; Ai Tsujisawa; Hanon Nishio	North Korea; Pak Ju-mi; Ri Myong-gum; Ri Kum-hyang; Oh Sol-song; An Kuk-hyang; An Pok-yong; Myong Yu-jong; Ri Song-a; Kim Song-gyong; Jong Kum; Han Jin-hong; Hong Song-ok; Jon Ryong-jong; Hwang Yu-yong; Choe Il-son; Song Chun-sim; Kim Kyong-yong; Yu Son-gum; Choe Kum-ok; Chae Un-yong; Chae Un-gyong; Kim Hye-yong; Ri Hye-gyong	South Korea; Kim Kyeong-hee; Ryu Ji-soo; Kim Min-jung; Han Da-in; Lee Min-hwa; Noh Jin-young; Ko Yoo-jin; Jeong Yu-jin; Jang Sel-gi; Kim Hye-ri; Choo Hyo-joo; Park Hye-jeong; Park Ye-na; Ji So-yun; Choe Yu-ri; Hyun Seul-gi; Jung Min-young; Yun Su-jeong; Kim Min-ji; Kang Tae-kyung; Kang Chae-rim; Son Hwa-yeon; Jeong Da-bin
