= Japan women's national football team results (2020–present) =

This page records the details of the Japan women's national football team from 2020 to present.

== 2020 ==
5 March 2020 SheBelieves Cup	Japan	1–3	Spain	Orlando, United States
16:15 ET	Iwabuchi 44'	Report	Putellas 8'; García 48', 78'	Stadium: Exploria Stadium; Attendance: 7,528; Referee: Katja Koroleva (United States)

8 March 2020 SheBelieves Cup	Japan	0–1	England	Harrison, United States
14:15 ET		Report	White 84'	Stadium: Red Bull Arena; Attendance: 14,758; Referee: Katja Koroleva (United States)

11 March 2020 SheBelieves Cup	United States	3–1	Japan	Frisco, United States
19:00 CT	Rapinoe 7'; Press 26'; Horan 83'	Report	Iwabuchi 58'	Stadium: Toyota Stadium; Referee: Melissa Borjas (Honduras)

11 April 2020 MS&AD Cup 2020	Japan	Cancelled	New Zealand	Sendai
15:00		Cancellation		Stadium: Yurtec Stadium

== 2021 ==
8 April Friendly	Japan	7–0	Paraguay	Sendai, Japan
16:30 UTC+9	Minami 6'; Iwabuchi 26', 63'; Bogarin 36' (o.g.); Sugasawa 52'; Momiki 90+2'; Tanaka 90+3'	Report (JFA); Report (JFA); Report (SW)		Stadium: Yurtec Stadium Sendai; Attendance: 818; Referee: Yoshimi Yamashita (Japan)

11 April Friendly	Japan	7–0	Panama	Tokyo, Japan
13:30 UTC+9	Sugasawa 8', 42', 56'; Shimizu 17'; Hasegawa 32'; Momiki 45'; Sugita 61'	Report (JFA); Report (JFA); Report (SW)		Stadium: Japan National Stadium; Attendance: 4,036; Referee: Azusa Sugino (Japan)

10 June Friendly	Japan	8–0	Ukraine	Hiroshima, Japan
15:15 UTC+9	Shiokoshi 5', 41'; Iwabuchi 30', 58'; Takarada 38'; Sugita 80'; Tanaka 89' (pen.); Momiki 90'	Report (JFA); Report (JFA); Report (SW)		Stadium: Edion Stadium Hiroshima; Attendance: 796; Referee: Yoshimi Yamashita (Japan)

13 June MS&AD CUP	Japan	5–1	Mexico	Utsunomiya, Japan
14:00 UTC+9	Iwabuchi 36'; Tanaka 46'; Momiki 54'; Kinoshita 74'; Endo 88'	Report (JFA); Report (JFA); Report (FMF); Report (SW)	González 49'	Stadium: Kanseki Stadium Tochigi; Attendance: 3,890; Referee: Asaka Koizumi (England)

14 July MS&AD CUP	Japan	1–0	Australia	Kameoka, Japan
19:20 UTC+9	Iwabuchi 54' (pen.)	Report (JFA); Report (JFA); Report (FA); Report (SW)		Stadium: Sanga Stadium by Kyocera; Attendance: 2,584; Referee: Azusa Sugino (Japan)

21 July Olympics GS	Japan	1–1	Canada	Sapporo, Japan
19:30 UTC+9	Iwabuchi 84'	Report (TOCOG); Report (FIFA); Report (JFA); Report (SW)	Sinclair 6'	Stadium: Sapporo Dome; Attendance: 0 Referee: Edina Alves Batista (Brazil)

24 July Olympics GS	Japan	0–1	Great Britain	Sapporo, Japan
19:30 UTC+9		Report (TOCOG); Report (FIFA); Report (JFA); Report (SW)	White 74'	Stadium: Sapporo Dome; Attendance: 0 Referee: Anastasia Pustovoitova (Russia)

27 July Olympics GS	Chile	0–1	Japan	Rifu, Japan
20:00 UTC+9		Report (TOCOG); Report (FIFA); Report (JFA); Report (SW)	Tanaka 77'	Stadium: Miyagi Stadium; Attendance: 1,326; Referee: Melissa Borjas (Honduras)

30 July Olympics QF	Sweden	3–1	Japan	Saitama, Japan
19:00 UTC+9	Eriksson 7'; Blackstenius 53'; Asllani 68' (pen.)	Report (TOCOG); Report (FIFA); Report (JFA); Report (SW)	Tanaka 23'	Stadium: Saitama Stadium 2002; Attendance: 0 Referee: Lucila Venegas (Mexico)

25 November Friendly	Japan	0–2	Iceland	Almere, Netherlands
TBD CET (UTC+1)		Report (JFA); Report (JFA); Report (Soccerway)	S. Jónsdóttir 14'; Torvalsdottir 70'	Stadium: Yanmar Stadion

29 November Friendly	Netherlands	0–0	Japan	The Hague, Netherlands
19:40 CET (UTC+1)		Report (JFA); Report (Soccerway)		Stadium: Cars Jeans Stadion

== 2022 ==
21 January Asian Cup GS	Japan	5–0	Myanmar	Pune, India
13:30 IST (UTC+05:30)	Ueki 22'; Hasegawa 47', 90+2'; Naomoto 52'; Narumiya 70'	Report		Stadium: Shree Shiv Chhatrapati Sports Complex

24 January Asian Cup GS	Vietnam	0–3	Japan	Pune, India
19:30 IST (UTC+05:30)		Report	Narumiya 38', 58'; Kumagai 50'	Stadium: Shree Shiv Chhatrapati Sports Complex

27 January Asian Cup GS	Japan	1–1	South Korea	Pune, India
13:30 IST (UTC+05:30)	Ueki 1'	Report	Seo Ji-youn 85'	Stadium: Shree Shiv Chhatrapati Sports Complex

30 January AFC Asian Cup QF	Japan	7–0	Thailand	Navi Mumbai, India
	Sugasawa 27', 65' (pen.), 80', 83'; Miyazawa 45+2'; Sumida 48'; Ueki 75'	Report (SW)		Stadium: DY Patil Stadium; Referee: Casey Reibelt (Australia)

3 February AFC Asian Cup SF	China	2–2 (a.e.t.) (4–3 p)	Japan	Pune, India
	Wu Chengshu 46'; Wang Shanshan 119'		Ueki 26', 103'	Stadium: Shiv Chhatrapati Sports Complex; Referee: Lara Lee (Australia)
	Penalties
	Zhang Xin (penalty missed); Zhang Rui (penalty scored); Yang Lina (penalty scored); Gao Chen (penalty scored); Wang Shanshan (penalty scored)		(penalty missed) Kumagai; (penalty scored) Hasegawa; (penalty scored) Shimizu; (penalty scored) Nagano; (penalty missed) Minami

24 June Friendly	Serbia	0–5	Japan	Stara Pazova, Serbia
		Report	Ueki 28'; Naomoto 62'; Miyazawa 76'; Chiba 81'; Narumiya 88'	Stadium: Sport Center FAS

27 June Friendly	Finland	1–5	Japan	Turku, Finland
	Engman 18'	Report	Kuikka 13' (o.g.); Endo 47'; Takahashi 58'; Ueki 74'; Hasegawa 89' (pen.)	Stadium: Veritas Stadion

19 July 2022 EAFF E-1 Football Championship	Japan	2–1	South Korea	Kashima, Japan
16:00	Miyazawa 33'; Nagano 65'	Report (EAFF)	Ji So-yun 59'	Stadium: Kashima Soccer Stadium; Attendance: 2,200; Referee: Pansa Chaisanit (Thailand)

23 July 2022 EAFF E-1 Football Championship	Japan	4–1	Chinese Taipei	Kashima, Japan
15:30	Chiba 14'; Ueno 45+2'; Chang Su-hsin 57' (o.g.); Sugasawa 72'	Report (EAFF)	Su Hsin-yun 8'	Stadium: Kashima Soccer Stadium; Attendance: 1,051; Referee: Veronika Bernatskaia (Kyrgyzstan)

26 July 2022 EAFF E-1 Football Championship	Japan	0–0	China	Kashima, Japan
19:20		Report (EAFF)		Stadium: Kashima Soccer Stadium; Attendance: 901; Referee: Pansa Chaisanit (Thailand)

6 October Friendly	Japan	2–0	Nigeria	Kobe, Japan
	Tanaka 64', 68' (pen.)	Report		Stadium: Noevir Stadium Kobe

9 October Friendly	Japan	2–0	New Zealand	Nagano, Japan
	Miyazawa 44'; Ueki 61'	Report		Stadium: Nagano U Stadium

11 November Friendly	England	4–0	Japan	San Pedro del Pinatar, Spain
20:00 CET (UTC+1)	Daly 38'; Kelly 53'; Toone 77'; Park 90+1'	Report		Stadium: Pinatar Arena; Referee: Zuzana Valentová (Slovakia)

15 November Friendly	Spain	1–0	Japan	Seville
20:00	Redondo 8'	Report		Stadium: La Cartuja; Attendance: 1,400; Referee: Ioanna Allayiotou (Cyprus)

== 2023 ==
16 February SheBelieves Cup	Japan	0–1	Brazil	Orlando, United States
16:00 ET		Report	Debinha 71'	Stadium: Exploria Stadium; Attendance: 6,453; Referee: Tori Penso (United States)

19 February SheBelieves Cup	United States	1–0	Japan	Nashville, United States
15:30 ET	Swanson 45'	Report		Stadium: Geodis Park; Attendance: 25,471; Referee: Myriam Marcotte (Canada)

22 February SheBelieves Cup	Canada	0–3	Japan	Frisco, United States
16:00 ET		Report	Seike 26'; Hasegawa 41' (pen.); Endo 77'	Stadium: Toyota Stadium; Attendance: 6,975; Referee: Danielle Chesky (United States)

7 April International friendly	Portugal	1–2	Japan	Guimarães, Portugal
17:00 UTC+1	Capeta 25'	Report (JFA)	Hasegawa 35'; Tanaka 53'	Stadium: Estádio D. Afonso Henriques

11 April International friendly	Denmark	1–0	Japan	Odense, Denmark
18:00 UTC+2	Minami 7' (o.g.)	Report (JFA)		Stadium: Odense Stadium

14 July MS & AD Cup	Japan	5–0	Panama	Sendai, Japan
19:05 UTC+9	Shimizu 33'; Hasegawa 37', 61'; Fujino 60'; Minami 90+2'	Source		Stadium: Yurtec Stadium Sendai

22 July 2023 FIFA World Cup GS	Zambia	0–5	Japan	Hamilton, New Zealand
19:00 UTC+12		Report	Miyazawa 43', 62'; Tanaka 55'; Endō 71'; Ueki 90+11' (pen.)	Stadium: Waikato Stadium; Attendance: 16,111; Referee: Tess Olofsson (Sweden)

26 July 2023 FIFA World Cup GS	Japan	2–0	Costa Rica	Dunedin, New Zealand
17:00 UTC+12	Naomoto 25'; Fujino 27'	Report		Stadium: Forsyth Barr Stadium; Attendance: 6,992; Referee: Maria Sole Ferrieri Caputi (Italy)

31 July 2023 FIFA World Cup GS	Japan	4–0	Spain	Wellington, New Zealand
19:00 UTC+12	Miyazawa 12', 40'; Ueki 29'; Tanaka 82'	Report		Stadium: Wellington Regional Stadium; Attendance: 20,957; Referee: Ekaterina Koroleva (United States)

5 August 2023 FIFA World Cup R16	Japan	3–1	Norway	Wellington, New Zealand
20:00 UTC+12	Engen 15' (o.g.); Shimizu 50'; Miyazawa 81'	Report	Reiten 20'	Stadium: Wellington Regional Stadium; Attendance: 33,042; Referee: Edina Alves Batista (Brazil)

11 August 2023 FIFA World Cup QF	Japan	1–2	Sweden	Auckland, New Zealand
19:30 UTC+12	Hayashi 87'	Report	Ilestedt 32'; Angeldahl 51' (pen.)	Stadium: Eden Park; Attendance: 43,217; Referee: Esther Staubli (Switzerland)

23 September International friendly	Japan	8–0	Argentina	Kitakyushu, Japan
12:00 UTC+9	Tanaka 2'; Hasegawa 10', 39'; Takahashi 25'; Seike 61', 90+2'; Sugita 66'; Ueki 80'	Report (JFA)		Stadium: Kitakyushu Stadium; Attendance: 7,265; Referee: Oh Hyeon-jeong (South Korea)

26 October 2024 Olympic Qualifiers R2	Japan	7–0	India	Tashkent, Uzbekistan
15:00 UTC+5	Nakashima 17', 46'; Hayashi 53'; Tanaka 54'; Moriya 57'; Seike 73'; Naomoto 82'	Report		Stadium: Lokomotiv Stadium

29 October 2024 Olympic Qualifiers R2	Uzbekistan	0–2	Japan	Tashkent, Uzbekistan
17:00 UTC+5		Report	Minami 10'; Chiba 15'	Stadium: Bunyodkor Stadium

1 November 2024 Olympic Qualifiers R2	Japan	2–0	Vietnam	Tashkent, Uzbekistan
15:00 UTC+5	Shimizu 40'; Moriya 53'	Report		Stadium: Lokomotiv Stadium

30 November Friendly	Brazil	4–3	Japan	São Paulo, Brazil
15:15 UTC−3	Bia Zaneratto 41', 63'; Gabi Portilho 61'; Priscila 90+6'	Report	Fujino 38'; Endo 86' (pen.); Tanaka 88'	Stadium: Arena Corinthians; Referee: María Victoria Daza (Colombia)

3 December Friendly	Brazil	0–2	Japan	São Paulo, Brazil
11:00 UTC−3		Report	Minami 15'; Tanaka 18'	Stadium: Estádio do Morumbi

== 2024 ==
24 February 2024 Olympic Qualifiers R3	North Korea	0–0	Japan	Jeddah, Saudi Arabia
--:--

28 February 2024 Olympic Qualifiers R3	Japan	2–1	North Korea	Tokyo, Japan
--:--

6 April 2024 SheBelieves Cup	United States	2–1	Japan	Atlanta, United States

9 April 2024 SheBelieves Cup	Japan	1–1 (0–3 p)	Brazil	Columbus, United States

31 May Friendly	Japan	2–0	New Zealand	Murcia, Spain
16:00 UTC+2	Tanaka 45+2'; Koga 47'	Report (JFA)		Stadium: Estadio Nueva Condomina; Referee: Jason Barcelo (Gibraltar)

3 June Friendly	Japan	4–1	New Zealand	Murcia, Spain
16:00 UTC+2	Hamano 49', 60'; Fujino 66'; Chiba 80'	Report (JFA)	Clegg 22'	Stadium: Estadio Nueva Condomina; Referee: Jason Barcelo (Gibraltar)

13 July MS&AD Cup	Japan	4–0	Ghana	Kanazawa, Japan
15:20 UTC+9	Tanaka 51'; Hamano 65'; Fujino 67'; Ueki 80'	Report (JFA)		Stadium: Kanazawa Go Go Curry Stadium; Attendance: 9,648; Referee: Oh Hyeon-jeong (Korea)

19 July Unofficial friendly	Japan	1–1	Colombia	Le Touquet, France
			Ramírez

25 July Olympic Games GS	Spain	2–1	Japan	Nantes, France
17:00 UTC+2	Bonmatí 22'; Caldentey 74'	Report	Fujino 13'	Stadium: Stade de la Beaujoire

28 July Olympic Games GS	Brazil	1–2	Japan	Paris, France
17:00 UTC+2	Jheniffer 56'	Report	Kumagai 90+2' (pen.); Tanikawa 90+6'	Stadium: Parc de Princes

31 July Olympic Games GS	Japan	3–1	Nigeria	Nantes, France
17:00 UTC+2	Hamano 22'; Tanaka 32'; Kitagawa 45+5'	Report	Echegini 42'	Stadium: Stade de la Beaujoire; Referee: Emikar Calderas (Venezuela

3 August Olympic Games QF	United States	1–0 (a.e.t.)	Japan	Paris, France
15:00 UTC+2	Rodman 105+2'	Report		Stadium: Parc de Princes; Attendance: 43,004; Referee: Tess Olofsson (Sweden)

26 October Mizuho Blue Dream Match	Japan	4–0	South Korea	Tokyo, Japan
14:20 UTC+9	Kitagawa 33'; Fujino 34'; Tanaka 37'; Tanikawa 56'	Report (JFA); Report (KFA)		Stadium: Japan National Stadium; Attendance: 12,420

== 2025 ==
20 February SheBelieves Cup	Japan	4–0	Australia	Houston, United States
16:00 UTC−6	Tanaka 6', 32'; Hamano 52'; Minami 75'	Report		Stadium: Shell Energy Stadium; Attendance: 5,243

23 February SheBelieves Cup	Colombia	1–4	Japan	Glendale, United States
13:00 UTC−7	Caicedo 45+4'	Report (USS); Report (JFA)	Tanikawa 1'; Tanaka 8', 80' (pen.); Hamano 57'	Stadium: State Farm Stadium; Attendance: 12,624; Referee: Alex Billeter (USA)

26 February SheBelieves Cup	United States	1–2	Japan	San Diego, United States
19:30 UTC−8	Sentnor 14'	Report	Momiki 2'; Koga 50'	Stadium: Snapdragon Stadium; Attendance: 17,188

6 April Friendly	Japan	1–1	Colombia	Osaka, Japan
14:00 UTC+9	Takahashi 90+4' (pen.)	Report	Torres 35'	Stadium: Yodoko Sakura Stadium; Attendance: 8,381; Referee: Oh Hyeon-jeong (South Korea)

8 April Unofficial Friendly	Japan	6–1	Colombia	Sakai, Japan
	Ueki 45+3' (pen.); Matsukubo 46'; Momiki 50'; Endo 57'; Takahashi 60'; Miharu Shinjo 90'	Report	Caracas 73'	Attendance: 500

30 May Friendly	Brazil	3–1	Japan	São Paulo, Brazil
21:30 UTC−3	Dudinha 27', 41'; Kerolin 55'	Report	Seike 88'	Stadium: Arena Corinthians

2 June Friendly	Brazil	2–1	Japan	São Paulo, Brazil
20:00 UTC−3	Ishikawa 54' (o.g.); Jhonson 78'	Report	Seike 46'	Stadium: Estádio Cícero de Souza Marques

27 June Friendly	Spain	3–1	Japan	Leganés, Spain
21:00 UTC+2	Pina 44'; López 66'; Del Castillo 88'	Report	Tanaka 30'	Stadium: Butarque; Attendance: 9,458; Referee: Milica Milovanović (Serbia)

9 July EAFF E-1 Football Championship	Japan	4–0	Chinese Taipei	Suwon, South Korea
16:30 UTC+9	Yakata 22'; Takikawa 25'; Takahashi 48'; Chen Ying-hui 70' (o.g.)	Report (EAFF); Report (JFA)		Stadium: Suwon World Cup Stadium; Attendance: 193; Referee: Pansa Chaisanit (Thailand)

13 July EAFF E-1 Football Championship	Japan	1–1	South Korea	Hwaseong, South Korea
20:00 UTC+9	Narumiya 37'		Jeong Da-bin 86'	Stadium: Hwaseong Sports Complex; Attendance: 1,641; Referee: Tam Ping Wun (Hong Kong)

16 July EAFF E-1 Football Championship	Japan	0–0	China	Suwon, South Korea
16:00 UTC+9		Report		Stadium: Suwon World Cup Stadium; Attendance: 323; Referee: Pansa Chaisanit (Thailand)

25 October Friendly	Italy	1–1	Japan	Como, Italy
18:15 UTC+2	Greggi 52'	Source (JFA)	Hasegawa 64'	Stadium: Stadio Giuseppe Sinigaglia

28 October Friendly	Norway	2–0	Japan	La Línea, Spain
18:00 UTC+1	Gaupset 28', 52'	Report		Stadium: Estadio Municipal de La Línea; Attendance: 30; Referee: Teresa Oliveira (Portugal)

29 November MS&AD Cup	Japan	3–0	Canada	Nagasaki, Japan
15:30 UTC+9	Tanikawa 43'; Tanaka 51'; Fujino 68'	Report		Stadium: Peace Stadium

2 December Friendly	Japan	1–0	Canada	Isahaya, Japan
	Tanaka 45'	Report		Stadium: Transcosmos Stadium Nagasaki

== 2026 ==
4 March 2026 AFC Women's Asian Cup	Japan	2–0	Chinese Taipei	Perth, Australia
13:00 UTC+8	Tanikawa 61'; Seike 90+2'	Report (AFC); Report (FIFA)		Stadium: Perth Rectangular Stadium; Referee: Oh Hyeon-jeong (South Korea)

7 March 2026 AFC Women's Asian Cup	India	0–11	Japan	Perth, Australia
19:00 UTC+8		Report (AFC); Report (FIFA)	Yamamoto 4'; Hasegawa 13'; Miyazawa 20', 35', 81'; Seike 45+5', 55'; Ueki 47', 50', 65'; Hijikata 62'	Stadium: Perth Rectangular Stadium; Attendance: 3,233; Referee: Veronika Bernatskaia (Kyrgyzstan)

10 March 2026 AFC Women's Asian Cup	Japan	4–0	Vietnam	Perth, Australia
17:00 UTC+8	Ueki 21'; Hamano 51'; Fujino 64'; Seike 67'	Report (AFC); Report (FIFA)		Stadium: HBF Park; Referee: Kim Yu-jeong (South Korea)

15 March 2026 AFC Women's Asian Cup	Japan	7–0	Philippines	Sydney, Australia
16:00 UTC+11	Tanaka 45'; Koga 45+3', 76'; Chiba 65'; Matsukubo 67'; Tanikawa 86'; Ueki 90'	Report (AFC); Report (FIFA)		Stadium: Stadium Australia; Referee: Dong Fangyu (China)

18 March 2026 AFC Women's Asian Cup	South Korea	1–4	Japan	Sydney, Australia
20:00 UTC+11	Kang Chae-rim 78'	Report (AFC); Report (FIFA)	Ueki 15'; Hamano 25'; Kumagai 75'; Chiba 81'	Stadium: Stadium Australia; Attendance: 17,367; Referee: Veronika Bernatskaia (Kyrgyzstan)

21 March 2026 AFC Women's Asian Cup	Japan	1–0	Australia	Sydney, Australia
20:00 UTC+11	Hamano 17'	Report (AFC); Report (FIFA)		Stadium: Stadium Australia; Attendance: 74,397; Referee: Kim Yu-jeong (South Korea)

11 April Friendly	United States	2–1	Japan	San Jose, United States
17:30 ET	Lavelle 9'; Heaps 48'	Report	Ueki 61'	Stadium: PayPal Park; Attendance: 17,435; Referee: Karen Andrade (Mexico)

14 April Friendly	United States	0–1	Japan	Seattle, United States
22:00 ET		Report	Hamano 27'	Stadium: Lumen Field; Attendance: 36,128; Referee: Janeishka Caban (Puerto Rico)

17 April Friendly	United States	3–0	Japan	Commerce City, United States
21:00 ET	Girma 47'; Lavelle 56'; Wesley 64'	Report		Stadium: Dick's Sporting Goods Park; Attendance: 17,589; Referee: Myriam Marcotte (Canada)

6 June Friendly	Japan	5–0	South Africa	Osaka, Japan
15:50 UTC+9	Seike 1', 19'; Tanikawa 29'; Fujino 49', 60'	Report		Stadium: Yodoko Sakura Stadium

9 June Friendly	Japan	0–1	South Africa	Osaka, Japan
15:30 UTC+9			Motlhalo 9'	Stadium: Natural Grass Main Field S1

14 September Asian Games GS	Japan	8–0	Thailand	Shizuoka, Japan
	Nakashima 3', 37', 41'; Kamiya 30'; Takarada 70', 74', 79'; Sakakibara 88'	Report		Stadium: Shizuoka Stadium ECOPA; Attendance: 1,202; Referee: Nurul Ain Izatty Zainal (Malaysia)

17 September Asian Games GS	Vietnam	0–8	Japan	Fukuroi, Japan
19:30 UTC+9		Report	Kamiya 12', 52'; Shiokoshi 19'; Cù Thị Huỳnh Như 43' (o.g.); Hamada 45+3'; Nishio 78'; Narumiya 81'; Yumura 90+2'	Stadium: Shizuoka Stadium ECOPA; Attendance: 1,029; Referee: Esra'a Al-Mbaiden (Jordan)

21 September Asian Games GS	Japan	4–0	Chinese Taipei	Fukuroi, Japan
19:30 UTC+9	Takarada 7' (pen.); Kamiya 20'; Ueno 51'; Ikuta 58'	Report		Stadium: Shizuoka Stadium ECOPA; Attendance: 3,679; Referee: Khin Nyein Chan (Myanmar)

25 September Asian Games QF	Japan	4–0	Philippines	Fukuroi, Japan
19:30 UTC+9	Takarada 2', 36'; Ueno 26'; Kamiya 45+2'	Report		Stadium: Shizuoka Stadium ECOPA; Attendance: 1,084; Referee: Esra'a Al-Mbaiden (Jordan)

29 September Asian Games SF	Japan	2–0	South Korea	Fukuroi, Japan
19:30 UTC+9	Kamiya 54', 63'	Report		Stadium: Shizuoka Stadium ECOPA; Attendance: 998; Referee: Lê Thị Ly (Vietnam)

2 October Asian Games F	North Korea	2–2 (a.e.t.) (3–5 p)	Japan	Fukuroi, Japan
19:30 UTC+9	Jong Kum 47'; Jon Ryong-jong 69'	Report	Ueno 32'; Nishio 86'	Stadium: Shizuoka Stadium ECOPA; Attendance: 6,243; Referee: Supiree Testhomya (Thailand)
	Penalties
	Myong Yu-jong (penalty scored); Jon Ryong-jong (penalty scored); Jong Kum (penalty missed); Ri Hye-gyong (penalty scored)		(penalty scored) Takarada; (penalty scored) Mizuno; (penalty scored) Kuwahara; (penalty scored) Nishio; (penalty scored) Shiokoshi

9 October Friendly	Haiti	1–5	Japan	Saint-Ouen-sur-Seine, France
20:00 UTC+1	B. Louis 45+3'	Source	Seike 26'; Hamano 33'; Hasegawa 38'; Chiba 57'; Hijikata 81'	Stadium: Stade Bauer

13 October Friendly	Germany	2–1	Japan	Bremen, Germany
17:45	Dallmann 28'; Bühl 73'	Report	Tanikawa 15'	Stadium: Weserstadion; Attendance: 26,574; Referee: Karoline Marie Jensen (Norway)

29 November Friendly	Japan	v	Brazil	Hiroshima, Japan
				Stadium: Edion Peace Wing Hiroshima

5 December Friendly	Japan	v	Brazil	Okayama, Japan
				Stadium: JFE Harenokuni Stadium

== See also ==
Japan
Women's

- International footballers
- National football team (Results)
- National under-20 football team
- National under-17 football team
- National futsal team

Men's

- International footballers
- National football team (Results (2020–present))
- National under-23 football team
- National under-20 football team
- National under-17 football team
- National futsal team
- National under-20 futsal team
- National beach soccer team
