= Vietnam women's national football team results (2020–present) =

National football team results

This article provides details of international football games played by the Vietnam women's national football team from 2020–present.

== Results ==
Key
Win
Draw
Defeat

=== 2020 ===
6 February 2020 AFC Olympic qualifiers R3	Vietnam	1–0	Myanmar	Seogwipo, South Korea
19:00 UTC+9	Ngân Thị Vạn Sự 62'			Stadium: Jeju World Cup Stadium; Attendance: 158; Referee: Qin Liang (China)

9 February 2020 AFC Olympic qualifiers R3	South Korea	3–0	Vietnam	Seogwipo, South Korea
15:00 UTC+9	Jang Sel-gi 23'; Choo Hyo-joo 53'; Ji So-yun 83'			Stadium: Jeju World Cup Stadium; Attendance: 1,278; Referee: Edita Mirabidova (Uzbekistan)

6 March 2020 AFC Olympic qualifiers PO	Australia	5–0	Vietnam	Newcastle, Australia
18:30 UTC+11	Kerr 10', 80' (pen.); Logarzo 27'; Van Egmond 38'; Polkinghorne 67'			Stadium: McDonald Jones Stadium; Attendance: 14,014; Referee: Abirami Naidu (Singapore

11 March 2020 AFC Olympic qualifiers PO	Vietnam	1–2	Australia	Quảng Ninh, Vietnam
18:00 UTC+7	Huỳnh Như 55'		Kerr 15'; Raso 27'	Stadium: Cẩm Phả Stadium; Attendance: 54; Referee: Thein Thein Aye (Myanmar)

=== 2021 ===
23 September 2022 AFC Women's Asian Cup qualification	Maldives	0–16	Vietnam	Dushanbe, Tajikistan
18:00 UTC+5			Nguyễn Thị Thanh Nhã 11', 62'; Haneefa 13' (o.g.); Nguyễn Thị Tuyết Dung 14', 65'; Nguyễn Thị Tuyết Ngân 32'; Trần Thị Thùy Trang 41'; Chương Thị Kiều 50'; Phạm Hải Yến 51', 59', 67', 73', 79', 84'; Huỳnh Như 55'; Hồ Thị Quỳnh 83'	Stadium: Pamir Stadium; Attendance: 0 Referee: Mahsa Ghorbani (Iran)

29 September 2022 AFC Women's Asian Cup qualification	Vietnam	7–0	Tajikistan	Dushanbe, Tajikistan
18:00 UTC+5	Phạm Hải Yến 14', 73'; Nguyễn Thị Bích Thùy 42', 54'; Huỳnh Như 51' (pen.); Hoàng Thị Loan 84'; Nguyễn Thị Vạn 90'			Stadium: Pamir Stadium; Attendance: 250; Referee: Pansa Chaisanit (Thailand)

=== 2022 ===
21 January 2022 AFC Women's Asian Cup GS	South Korea	3–0	Vietnam	Pune, India
19:30 UTC+5:30	Ji So-yun 4', 81' (pen.); Trần Thị Phương Thảo 7' (o.g.)			Stadium: Shiv Chhatrapti Sports Complex; Referee: Qin Liang (China)

24 January 2022 AFC Women's Asian Cup GS	Vietnam	0–3	Japan	Pune, India
19:30 UTC+5:30			Narumiya 38', 58'; Kumagai 50'	Stadium: Shiv Chhatrapati Sports Complex; Referee: Lara Lee (Australia)

27 January 2022 AFC Women's Asian Cup GS	Vietnam	2–2	Myanmar	Navi Mumbai, India
13:30 UTC+5:30	Nguyễn Thị Tuyết Dung 45+2'; Huỳnh Như 64' (pen.)		Win Theingi Tun 28' (pen.); Khin Marlar Tun 49'	Stadium: DY Patil Stadium; Referee: Ranjita Devi Tekcham (India)

30 January 2022 AFC Women's Asian Cup QF	China	3–1	Vietnam	Navi Mumbai, India
17:30 UTC+5:30	Wang Shuang 25'; Wang Shanshan 52'; Tang Jiali 53'		Nguyễn Thị Tuyết Dung 11'	Stadium: DY Patil Stadium; Referee: Oh Hyeon-jeong (South Korea)

2 February 2023 FIFA Women's World Cup PO	Thailand	0–2	Vietnam	Navi Mumbai, India
13:30 UTC+5:30			Huỳnh Như 19'; Thái Thị Thảo 24'	Stadium: DY Patil Stadium; Referee: Edita Mirabidova (Uzbekistan)

6 February 2023 FIFA Women's World Cup PO	Vietnam	2–1	Chinese Taipei	Navi Mumbai, India
13:00 UTC+5:30	Chương Thị Kiều 7'; Nguyễn Thị Bích Thùy 56'		Su Yu-hsuan 50'	Stadium: DY Patil Stadium; Referee: Yoshimi Yamashita (Japan)

9 April Friendly	South Korea	3–0	Vietnam	Goyang, South Korea
16:30 UTC+9	Choe Yu-ri 38'; Kang Chae-rim 54'; Lee Geum-min 67'	Report		Stadium: Goyang Stadium; Referee: Cha Min-ji (South Korea)

12 April Unofficial friendly	South Korea	2–3	Vietnam	Gyeongju, South Korea
13:00 UTC+9		Report

9 May 2021 SEA Games GS	Vietnam	Cancelled	Indonesia	Quảng Ninh, Vietnam
19:00 UTC+7				Stadium: Cẩm Phả Stadium

11 May 2021 SEA Games GS	Vietnam	2–1	Philippines	Quảng Ninh, Vietnam
19:00 UTC+7	Nguyễn Thị Tuyết Dung 38'; Trần Thị Thùy Trang 50'	Report	Annis 15'	Stadium: Cẩm Phả Stadium; Attendance: 16,100; Referee: Rebecca Durcau (Australia)

14 May 2021 SEA Games GS	Cambodia	0–7	Vietnam	Quảng Ninh, Vietnam
19:00 UTC+7		Report	Nguyễn Thị Vạn 6', 77'; Phạm Hải Yến 58' (pen.); Nguyễn Thị Tuyết Dung 65'; Trần Thị Thu 79'; Ngân Thị Vạn Sự 81'; Dương Thị Vân 87'	Stadium: Cẩm Phả Stadium; Attendance: 16,000; Referee: Anna Sidorova (Uzbekistan)

18 May 2021 SEA Games SF	Vietnam	1–0	Myanmar	Quảng Ninh, Vietnam
19:00 UTC+7	Huỳnh Như 28'	Report		Stadium: Cẩm Phả Stadium; Attendance: 15,950; Referee: Haruna Kanematsu (Japan)

21 May 2021 SEA Games Gold medal	Vietnam	1–0	Thailand	Quảng Ninh, Vietnam
19:00 UTC+7	Huỳnh Như 59'	Report		Stadium: Cẩm Phả Stadium; Attendance: 16,020; Referee: Choki Om (Bhutan)

1 July Friendly	France	7–0	Vietnam	Orléans, France
21:10 UTC+2	Cascarino 5'; Diani 11', 45+1'; Toletti 16'; Katoto 22'; Matéo 33'; Tounkara 68'	Report		Stadium: Stade de la Source; Referee: Shona Shukrula (Netherlands)

7 July 2022 AFF Women's Championship GS	Cambodia	0–3	Vietnam	Biñan, Philippines
19:00 UTC+8			Ngân Thị Vạn Sự 19'; Phạm Hải Yến 32' (pen.); Nguyễn Thị Thanh Nhã 45+2'	Stadium: Biñan Football Stadium; Referee: Supiree Testhomya (Thailand)

9 July 2022 AFF Women's Championship GS	Vietnam	5–0	Laos	Biñan, Philippines
19:00 UTC+8	Phạm Hoàng Quỳnh 41'; Huỳnh Như 45+1', 72'; Phạm Hải Yến 57', 65'			Stadium: Biñan Football Stadium; Referee: Pansa Chaisanit (Thailand)

11 July 2022 AFF Women's Championship GS	Timor-Leste	0–6	Vietnam	Biñan, Philippines
19:00 UTC+8			Huỳnh Như 11', 43'; Ngân Thị Vạn Sự 31', 73'; Nguyễn Thị Tuyết Dung 37' (pen.); Trần Thị Thùy Trang 85'	Stadium: Biñan Football Stadium; Referee: Keomany Phengmeuangkhoun (Laos)

13 July 2022 AFF Women's Championship GS	Vietnam	4–0	Myanmar	Manila, Philippines
19:00 UTC+8	Nguyễn Thị Tuyết Dung 16', 32' (pen.); Huỳnh Như 45+2'; Phạm Hải Yến 89'			Stadium: Rizal Memorial Stadium

15 July 2022 AFF Women's Championship SF	Vietnam	0–4	Philippines	Manila, Philippines
20:00 UTC+8			Long 31'; Annis 50' (pen.); Bolden 61', 70'	Stadium: Rizal Memorial Stadium

17 July 2022 AFF Women's Championship 3rd place	Myanmar	4–3	Vietnam	Manila, Philippines
16:00 UTC+8	Saw Thaw Thaw 9', 56', 86'; Lin Mynt Mo 83'		Huỳnh Như 23', 39'; Phạm Hải Yến 80'	Stadium: Rizal Memorial Stadium

=== 2023 ===
April 2024 AFC Olympic qualifiers R1	Afghanistan	Cancelled	Vietnam	Kathmandu, Nepal
				Stadium: Dasarath Stadium

April 2024 AFC Olympic qualifiers R1	Palestine	Cancelled	Vietnam	Kathmandu, Nepal
				Stadium: Dasarath Stadium

5 April 2024 AFC Olympic qualifiers R1	Nepal	1–5	Vietnam	Kathmandu, Nepal
18:00 UTC+5:45	Bhandari 80'	Report	Phạm Hải Yến 11'; Huỳnh Như 36' (pen.), 48'; Nguyễn Thị Bích Thùy 38'; Nguyễn Thị Thanh Nhã 90+1'	Stadium: Dasarath Stadium; Attendance: 2,715; Referee: Sunita Thongthawin (Thailand)

8 April 2024 AFC Olympic qualifiers R1	Vietnam	2–0	Nepal	Kathmandu, Nepal
18:00 UTC+5:45	Phạm Hải Yến 4', 7'	Report		Stadium: Dasarath Stadium

3 May 2023 SEA Games GS	Vietnam	3–0	Malaysia	Phnom Penh, Cambodia
16:00 UTC+7	Phạm Hải Yến 5'; Nguyễn Thị Bích Thùy 24'; Jaciah 34' (o.g.)			Stadium: RCAF Old Stadium

6 May 2023 SEA Games GS	Myanmar	1–3	Vietnam	Phnom Penh, Cambodia
16:00 UTC+7	Naw Htet Htet Wai 42'		Huỳnh Như 10'; Nguyễn Thị Thanh Nhã 76'; Trần Thị Thùy Trang 89'	Stadium: RCAF Old Stadium

9 May 2023 SEA Games GS	Vietnam	1–2	Philippines	Phnom Penh, Cambodia
16:00 UTC+7	Nguyễn Thị Bích Thùy 40'		Bolden 12' (pen.); Long 82'	Stadium: RSN Stadium

12 May 2023 SEA Games SF	Vietnam	4–0	Cambodia	Phnom Penh, Cambodia
16:00 UTC+7	Ngân Thị Vạn Sự 20'; Phạm Hải Yến 30'; Trần Thị Thùy Trang 36' (pen.); Huỳnh Như 90+3' (pen.)			Stadium: Olympic Stadium; Attendance: 9,849; Referee: Mahnaz Zokaee (Iran)

15 May 2023 SEA Gold medal	Vietnam	2–0	Myanmar	Phnom Penh, Cambodia
19:30 UTC+7	Huỳnh Như 12'; Nguyễn Thị Thanh Nhã 75'			Stadium: Olympic Stadium; Referee: Plong Pichakara (Cambodia)

24 June Friendly	Germany	2–1	Vietnam	Offenbach, Germany
18:15 UTC+2	Krumbiegel 3'; Minge 80'		Nguyễn Thị Thanh Nhã 90+3'	Stadium: Stadion am Bieberer Berg; Attendance: 13,642; Referee: Kirsty Dowle (England)

10 July Friendly	New Zealand	2–0	Vietnam	Napier, New Zealand
17:30 UTC+12	Bott 17'; Hand 44'			Stadium: McLean Park; Referee: Rebecca Durcau (Australia)

14 July Unofficial friendly	Vietnam	0–9	Spain	Auckland, New Zealand
12:30			Redondo 7'; Del Castillo 12'; Paralluelo 51', 88'; González 60', 65'; Hermoso 63', 83'; Bonmatí 71'	Stadium: McLennan Park; Attendance: 0

22 July 2023 FIFA Women's World Cup GS	United States	3–0	Vietnam	Auckland, New Zealand
13:00 UTC+12	Smith 14', 45+7'; Horan 77'	Report (FIFA)		Stadium: Eden Park; Attendance: 41,107; Referee: Bouchra Karboubi (Morocco)

27 July 2023 FIFA Women's World Cup GS	Portugal	2–0	Vietnam	Hamilton, New Zealand
19:30 UTC+12	Encarnação 7'; Nazareth 21'	Report (FIFA)		Stadium: Waikato Stadium; Attendance: 6,645; Referee: Salima Mukansanga (Rwanda)

1 August 2023 FIFA Women's World Cup GS	Vietnam	0–7	Netherlands	Dunedin, New Zealand
19:00 UTC+12		Report (FIFA)	Martens 8'; Snoeijs 11'; Brugts 18', 57'; Roord 23', 83'; van de Donk 45'	Stadium: Forsyth Barr Stadium; Attendance: 8,215; Referee: Ivana Martinčić (Croatia)

2 September Unofficial friendly	Vietnam	2–1	Hong Kong	Haiphong, Vietnam
19:30 UTC+7	Phạm Hải Yến; Nguyễn Thị Thúy Hằng	Report		Stadium: Lach Tray Stadium

22 September 2022 Asian Games GS	Vietnam	2–0	Nepal	Wenzhou, China
16:00 UTC+8	Phạm Hải Yến 53'; Nguyễn Thị Bích Thùy 64'	Report		Stadium: Wenzhou Olympic Stadium; Attendance: 1,367; Referee: Dong Fangyu (China)

25 September 2022 Asian Games GS	Bangladesh	1–6	Vietnam	Wenzhou, China
16:00 UTC+8	Parvin 87' (pen.)	Report	Phạm Hải Yến 5'; Nguyễn Thị Thúy Hằng 34'; Trần Thị Duyên 66'; Thái Thị Thảo 78'; Nguyễn Thị Bích Thùy 71', 80'	Stadium: Wenzhou Olympic Stadium; Attendance: 2,108; Referee: Yu Hong (China)

28 September 2022 Asian Games GS	Japan	7–0	Vietnam	Wenzhou, China
16L00 UTC+8	Shiokoshi 19', 24'; Chiba 51', 77'; Wakisaka 55' (pen.); Osawa 69', 90+2'	Report		Stadium: Wenzhou Olympic Stadium; Attendance: 10,174; Referee: Lara Christie Lee (Australia)

26 October 2024 AFC Olympic qualifiers R2	Vietnam	0–1	Uzbekistan	Tashkent, Uzbekistan
17:00 UTC+5		Report	Khabibullaeva 30'	Stadium: Bunyodkor Stadium; Attendance: 2,570; Referee: Casey Reibelt (Australia)

29 October 2024 AFC Olympic qualifiers R2	India	1–3	Vietnam	Tashkent, Uzbekistan
15:00 UTC+5	Sandhiya 80'	Report	Huỳnh Như 4'; Trần Thị Hải Linh 22'; Phạm Hải Yến 73'	Stadium: Lokomotiv Stadium; Attendance: 150; Referee: Pansa Chaisanit (Thailand)

1 November 2024 AFC Olympic qualifiers R2	Japan	2–0	Vietnam	Tashkent, Uzbekistan
15:00 UTC+5	Shimizu 40'; Moriya 53'	Report		Stadium: Lokomotiv Stadium; Attendance: 200; Referee: Yang Shu-Ting (Chinese Taipei)

=== 2024 ===
23 October 2024 Yongchuan International Tournament	Vietnam	2–0	Uzbekistan	Chongqing, China
15:30 UTC+8	Nguyễn Thị Tuyết Dung 4'; Phạm Hải Yến 35'	Report		Stadium: Yongchuan Sports Center

29 October 2024 Yongchuan International Tournament	China	2–0	Vietnam	Chongqing, China
19:35 UTC+8	Zhang Xin 43'; Trần Thị Thu Thảo 90+3' (o.g.)			Stadium: Yongchuan Sports Center

=== 2025 ===
29 June 2026 AFC Women's Asian Cup qualification	Vietnam	7–0	Maldives	Phú Thọ, Vietnam
19:00 UTC+7	Ngân Thị Vạn Sự 7', 11'; Nguyễn Thị Bích Thùy 14'; Nguyễn Thị Vạn 25'; Nguyễn Thị Mỹ Anh 30'; Ngọc Minh Chuyên 44'; Phạm Hải Yến 67'	Report		Stadium: Việt Trì Stadium; Referee: Dong Fangyu (China)

2 July 2026 AFC Women's Asian Cup qualification	United Arab Emirates	0–6	Vietnam	Phú Thọ, Vietnam
19:00 UTC+7		Report	Chương Thị Kiều 11'; Thái Thị Thảo 14'; Nguyễn Thị Vạn 43', 51'; Phạm Hải Yến 64'; Ngân Thị Vạn Sự 90+5'	Stadium: Việt Trì Stadium; Referee: Dong Fangyu (China)

5 July 2026 AFC Women's Asian Cup qualification	Vietnam	4–0	Guam	Phú Thọ, Vietnam
19:00 UTC+7	Nguyễn Thị Vạn 1'; Nguyễn Thị Bích Thùy 13', 25'; Lê Thị Diễm My 73'	Report		Stadium: Việt Trì Stadium; Referee: Alesar Baddour (Syria)

6 August 2025 ASEAN Women's Championship GS	Vietnam	6–0	Cambodia	Haiphong, Vietnam
19:30 UTC+7	Dương Thị Vân 7'; Ngân Thị Vạn Sự 11'; Phạm Hải Yến 14' (pen.); Nguyễn Thị Vạn 17'; Nguyễn Thị Trúc Hương 51'; Thái Thị Thảo 60'	Report		Stadium: Lạch Tray Stadium; Referee: Muhammad Izzul (Malaysia)

9 August 2025 ASEAN Women's Championship GS	Indonesia	0–7	Vietnam	Haiphong, Vietnam
19:30 UTC+7		Report	Nguyễn Thị Bích Thùy 25'; Hoàng Thị Loan 28'; Phạm Hải Yến 69', 85'; Ngân Thị Vạn Sự 71'; Trần Thị Thu Thảo 81'; Nguyễn Thị Tuyết Dung 89'	Stadium: Lạch Tray Stadium; Referee: Asker Nadjafaliev (Uzbekistan)

12 August 2025 ASEAN Women's Championship GS	Vietnam	1–0	Thailand	Haiphong, Vietnam
19:30 UTC+7	Trần Thị Thu Thảo 36'	Report		Stadium: Lạch Tray Stadium; Referee: Rustam Lutfullin (Uzbekistan)

16 August 2025 ASEAN Women's Championship SF	Vietnam	1–2	Australia U-23	Haiphong, Vietnam
20:00 UTC+7	Nguyễn Thị Bích Thùy 88'	Report	Keane 7'; McKenna 16'	Stadium: Lạch Tray Stadium; Referee: Yoshimi Yamashita (Japan)

19 August 2025 ASEAN Women's Championship 3rd place	Thailand	1–3	Vietnam	Haiphong, Vietnam
16:30	Wiranya 87'	Report	Phạm Hải Yến 45'; Huỳnh Như 65'; Nguyễn Thị Bích Thùy 68'	Stadium: Lạch Tray Stadium; Referee: Kim Yu-jeong (South Korea)

5 December 2025 SEA Games GS	Vietnam	7–0	Malaysia	Chonburi, Thailand
18:30 UTC+7	Phạm Hải Yến 4', 26'; Nguyễn Thị Bích Thùy 23'; Trần Thị Hải Linh 36'; Thái Thị Thảo 48', 59', 78'	Report		Stadium: Chonburi Stadium; Referee: Rawdha Almansoori (United Arab Emirates)

8 December 2025 SEA Games GS	Philippines	1–0	Vietnam	Chonburi, Thailand
18:30 UTC+7	Ramirez 90+4'	Report		Stadium: Chonburi Stadium; Referee: Gulshoda Saidqulova (Uzbekistan)

11 December 2025 SEA Games GS	Vietnam	2–0	Myanmar	Chonburi, Thailand
16:00 UTC+7	Ngân Thị Vạn Sự 8'; Nguyễn Thị Bích Thùy 14'	Report		Stadium: Chonburi Stadium; Referee: Esraa Almbaidin (Jordan)

14 December 2025 SEA Games SF	Vietnam	5–0	Indonesia	Chonburi, Thailand
16:00 UTC+7	Nguyễn Thị Bích Thùy 28' (pen.), 80'; Phạm Hải Yến 49', 58'; Huỳnh Như 86'	Report		Stadium: IPE Chonburi Stadium; Referee: Alesar Baddour (Syria)

17 December 2025 SEA Games Gold Medal Match	Philippines	0–0 (a.e.t.) (6–5 p)	Vietnam	Chonburi, Thailand
19:30 UTC+7		Report		Stadium: Chonburi Stadium; Referee: Rebecca Durcau (Australia)
	Penalties
	Jael-Marie (penalty scored); Pino (penalty scored); Hali (penalty scored); Angela (penalty scored); Markey (penalty scored); Sawicki (penalty scored)		(penalty scored) Huỳnh Như; (penalty scored) Ngọc Minh Chuyên; (penalty scored) Nguyễn Thị Trúc Hương; (penalty scored) Hoàng Thị Loan; (penalty scored) Cù Thị Huỳnh Như; (penalty missed) Trần Thị Thu

=== 2026 ===
27 January Unofficial friendly	Vietnam	1–0	Uzbekistan	Hanoi, Vietnam
16:00 UTC+7	Nguyễn Thị Bích Thùy 59'	Report

30 January Unofficial friendly	Vietnam	2–6	Uzbekistan	Hanoi, Vietnam
15:30 UTC+7		Report	Karachik 52', 70', 75'; Asadova 81'; Shoyimova 87'; Valixonova 90+2'

10 February Unofficial friendly	China	2–0	Vietnam	Shenzhen, China
19:00 UTC+8	Wurigumula 30', 46'	Report		Stadium: Shenzhen Youth Football Training Base Centre Stadium

13 February Unofficial friendly	China	6–1	Vietnam	Shenzhen, China
19:00 UTC+8	Wang Linlin 8'; Wurigumula 49'; Jin Kun 52'; Zhang Xin 62'; Shao Ziqin 72'; Lu Yatong 82'	Report	Nguyễn Thị Thanh Nhã 66'	Stadium: Shenzhen Youth Football Training Base Centre Stadium

4 March 2026 AFC Women's Asian Cup GS	Vietnam	2–1	India	Perth, Australia
19:00 UTC+8	Ngân Thị Vạn Sự 30', 90+4'	Report (AFC); Report (FIFA)	Sanfida 52'	Stadium: HBF Park; Attendance: 1,961; Referee: Kim Yu-jeong (South Korea)

7 March 2026 AFC Women's Asian Cup GS	Chinese Taipei	1–0	Vietnam	Perth, Australia
13:00 UTC+8	Su Yu-hsuan 26'	Report (AFC); Report (FIFA)		Stadium: HBF Park; Attendance: 1,784; Referee: Lara Lee (Australia)

10 March 2026 AFC Women's Asian Cup GS	Japan	4–0	Vietnam	Perth, Australia
17:00 UTC+8	Ueki 21'; Hamano 51'; Fujino 64'; Seike 67'	Report (AFC); Report (FIFA)		Stadium: HBF Park; Attendance: 3,648; Referee: Kim Yu-jeong (South Korea)

9 September Unofficial friendly	China	3–0	Vietnam	Suzhou, China
--:-- UTC+8		Report

14 September 2026 Asian Games GS	Chinese Taipei	2–1	Vietnam	Fukuroi, Japan
16:00 UTC+9	Su Yu-hsuan 16'; Wakabayashi 81'	Report	Nguyễn Thị Thanh Nhã 85'	Stadium: Shizuoka Stadium; Referee: Park Se-jin (South Korea)

17 September 2026 Asian Games GS	Vietnam	0–8	Japan	Fukuroi, Japan
19:30 UTC+9		Report	Kamiya 12', 52'; Shiokoshi 19'; Cù Thị Huỳnh Như 43' (o.g.); Hamada 45+3'; Nishio 78'; Narumiya 81'; Yumura 90+2'	Stadium: Shizuoka Stadium; Attendance: 1,029; Referee: Esraa Al-Mbaiden (Jordan)

21 September 2026 Asian Games GS	Vietnam	0–0	Thailand	Osaka, Japan
19:30 UTC+9		Report		Stadium: Nagai Stadium; Referee: Veronika Bernatskaia (Kyrgyzstan)

25 September 2026 Asian Games QF	China	1–0 (a.e.t.)	Vietnam	Osaka, Japan
15:00 UTC+9	Wang Shuang 109'	Report		Stadium: Nagai Stadium; Attendance: 252; Referee: Azusa Sugino (Japan)

== Hybrid friendlies ==
21 January 2021 Hybrid friendly	Vietnam	4–0	(Vietnam) Hà Nội II	Hanoi, Vietnam
--:-- UTC+7		Report		Stadium: Vietnam Youth Football Training Center

30 December 2021 Hybrid friendly	CD Pozoalbense (Spain)	0–3	Vietnam	Córdoba, Spain
19:15 UTC+1		Report	Nguyễn Thị Vạn 17'; Nguyễn Thị Tuyết Ngân 30'; Nguyễn Thị Thanh Nhã 90'

2 January 2022 Hybrid friendly	CF La Solana (Spain)	0–0	Vietnam	La Solana, Spain
17:00 UTC+1		Report

4 January 2022 Hybrid friendly	Córdoba CF (Spain)	0–3	Vietnam	Córdoba, Spain
17:00 UTC+1		Report	Nguyễn Thị Vạn 27'; Nguyễn Thị Thanh Nhã 44'; Phạm Hải Yến 60'

6 January 2022 Hybrid friendly	Sporting de Huelva (Spain)	Cancelled	Vietnam	Huelva, Spain
11:30 UTC+1

15 April 2022 Hybrid friendly	Uiduk University (South Korea)	1–4	Vietnam	Gyeongju, South Korea
11:00 UTC+9		Report	Nguyễn Thị Vạn 21'; Nguyễn Thị Thúy Hằng 43', 72'; Nguyễn Thị Bích Thùy 82'	Stadium: Gyeongju Civic Stadium

18 April 2022 Hybrid friendly	Gyeongju KHNP (South Korea)	2–2	Vietnam	Gyeongju, South Korea
15:00 UTC+9	7'; 81' (pen.)	Report	Phạm Hải Yến 10'; Huỳnh Như 35'	Stadium: Gyeongju Civic Stadium

27 April 2022 Hybrid friendly	Than KSVN (Vietnam)	0–1	Vietnam	Quảng Ninh, Vietnam
--:-- UTC+7		Report		Stadium: Cửa Ông Stadium; Attendance: 0

29 April 2022 Hybrid friendly	Than KSVN (Vietnam)	1–0	Vietnam	Quảng Ninh, Vietnam
--:-- UTC+7	83'	Report		Stadium: Cẩm Phả Stadium; Attendance: 0

5 May 2022 Hybrid friendly	Than KSVN (Vietnam)	1–4	Vietnam	Quảng Ninh, Vietnam
--:-- UTC+7		Report		Stadium: Cẩm Phả Stadium; Attendance: 0

19 April 2023 Hybrid friendly	Biwako Seikei College (Japan)	0–4	Vietnam	Osaka, Japan
14:00 UTC+9		Report		Stadium: J-Green Sakai Sports Center

22 April 2023 Hybrid friendly	Cerezo Osaka (Japan)	2–0	Vietnam	Osaka, Japan
--:-- UTC+9	Tanaka 11'; Momono 42'	Report		Stadium: J-Green Sakai Sports Center

26 April 2023 Hybrid friendly	Osaka UHSS (Japan)	0–0	Vietnam	Osaka, Japan
--:-- UTC+9		Report		Stadium: J-Green Sakai Sports Center

10 June 2023 Hybrid friendly	Eintracht Frankfurt U-20 (Germany)	1–2	Vietnam	Rüsselsheim am Main, Germany
14:00 UTC+2	Khalifa 65'	Report	Nguyễn Thị Bích Thùy 9'; Phạm Hải Yến 52'	Stadium: Sommerdamm Stadium

15 June 2023 Hybrid friendly	TSV Schott Mainz (Germany)	0–2	Vietnam	Rüsselsheim am Main, Germany
14:00 UTC+2		Report	Phạm Hải Yến 10'; Nguyễn Thị Thúy Hằng 90'	Stadium: Sommerdamm Stadium

19 June 2023 Hybrid friendly	Poland U-23	2–1	Vietnam	Pruszków, Poland
11:00 UTC+2	Sobal 23'; Grzybowska 58'	Report	Ngân Thị Vạn Sự 88'	Stadium: Znicz Pruszków Stadium

4 September 2024 Hybrid friendly	RB Leipzig (Germany)	2–0	Vietnam	Leipzig, Germany
18:00 UTC+2	Müller; Schimmer	Report		Stadium: Red Bull Arena

8 September 2024 Hybrid friendly	FK Pardubice (Czech Republic)	0–6	Vietnam	Pardubice, Czech Republic
13:00 UTC+2		Report	Huỳnh Như 30', 37'; Vũ Thị Hoa 65', 75'; Nguyễn Thị Tuyết Ngân 70', 89'	Stadium: Pod Vinicí

11 September 2024 Hybrid friendly	Viktoria Plzeň (Czech Republic)	0–3	Vietnam	Vestec, Czech Republic
18:00 UTC+2		Report	Huỳnh Như 6'; Nguyễn Thị Vạn 16', 35'	Stadium: TJ Viktoria Vestec Sports Centre

12 May 2025 Hybrid friendly	Vietnam	0–0	(Vietnam) Hồ Chí Minh City	Hanoi, Vietnam
--:-- UTC+7		Report		Stadium: Vietnam Youth Football Training Center

16 May 2025 Hybrid friendly	Vietnam	1–4	(Germany) Werder Bremen	Hanoi, Vietnam
19:00 UTC+7	Ngọc Minh Chuyên 64'	Report	Walkling 15'; Mühlhaus 50', 81'; Pápai 90+4'	Stadium: Hàng Đẫy Stadium

11 June 2025 Hybrid friendly	Iga Kunoichi (Japan)	2–3	Vietnam	Osaka, Japan
--:-- UTC+9		Report		Stadium: J-Green Sakai Sports Center

13 June 2025 Hybrid friendly	Tezukayama Gakuin University (Japan)	1–3	Vietnam	Osaka, Japan
--:-- UTC+9		Report		Stadium: J-Green Sakai Sports Center

15 June 2025 Hybrid friendly	Osaka UHSS (Japan)	1–1	Vietnam	Osaka, Japan
--:-- UTC+9		Report		Stadium: J-Green Sakai Sports Center

25 July 2025 Hybrid friendly	Than KSVN (Vietnam)	2–3	Vietnam	Quảng Ninh, Vietnam
--:-- UTC+7		Report		Stadium: Cẩm Phả Stadium

1 November 2025 Hybrid friendly	Vietnam	3–2	(Vietnam) Hồ Chí Minh City	Hanoi, Vietnam
--:-- UTC+7	Nguyễn Thị Vạn; Ngân Thị Vạn Sự; Nguyễn Thị Bích Thùy	Report	Goodwill; Ngô Thị Hồng Nhung	Stadium: Vietnam Youth Football Training Center

4 November 2025 Hybrid friendly	Vietnam	1–2	(Vietnam) Hồ Chí Minh City	Hanoi, Vietnam
--:-- UTC+7	Nguyễn Thị Thanh Nhã	Report	Huỳnh Như; Lê Hoài Lương	Stadium: Vietnam Youth Football Training Center

24 November 2025 Hybrid friendly	Aichi Toho University (Japan)	0–3	Vietnam	Hamamatsu, Japan
--:-- UTC+9		Report	Nguyễn Thị Bích Thùy 53', 56'; Thái Thị Thảo 69'

26 November 2025 Hybrid friendly	Shizuoka Sangyo University (Japan)	2–1	Vietnam	Hamamatsu, Japan
--:-- UTC+9	? 40'; ? 47'	Report	Nguyễn Thị Trúc Hương 85'

5 September 2026 Hybrid friendly	Jiangsu Wuxi (China)	0–1	Vietnam	Suzhou, China
--:-- UTC+9		Report	Phạm Hải Yến 14'

== Head-to-head records ==
As of 25 September 2026

Vietnam women's national football team head-to-head records
Opponents	Pld	W	D	L	GF	GA	GD	Pts
Australia	2	0	0	2	1	7	–6	0
Bangladesh	1	1	0	0	6	1	+5	3
Cambodia	4	4	0	0	20	0	+20	12
China	3	0	0	3	1	6	–5	0
Chinese Taipei	3	1	0	2	3	4	–1	3
France	1	0	0	1	0	7	–7	0
Germany	1	0	0	1	1	2	–1	0
Guam	1	1	0	0	4	0	+4	3
India	2	2	0	0	5	2	+3	6
Indonesia	2	2	0	0	12	0	+12	6
Japan	4	0	0	4	0	17	–17	0
South Korea	3	0	0	3	0	9	–9	0
Laos	1	1	0	0	5	0	+5	3
Malaysia	2	2	0	0	10	0	+10	6
Maldives	2	2	0	0	23	0	+23	6
Myanmar	8	6	1	1	18	7	+11	19
Nepal	2	2	0	0	7	1	+6	6
Netherlands	1	0	0	1	0	7	–7	0
New Zealand	1	0	0	1	0	2	–2	0
Philippines	5	1	1	3	3	8	–5	3
Portugal	1	0	0	1	0	2	–2	0
Tajikistan	1	1	0	0	7	0	+7	3
Thailand	5	4	1	0	7	1	+6	13
Timor-Leste	1	1	0	0	6	0	+6	3
United Arab Emirates	1	1	0	0	6	0	+6	3
United States	1	0	0	1	0	3	–3	0
Uzbekistan	2	1	0	1	2	1	+1	3
