= Skye Leach =

Filipino footballer (born 2003)

Personal information
- Date of birth: August 10, 2003 (age 23)
- Place of birth: Texas, U.S.
- Height: 1.70 m (5 ft 7 in)
- Position: Midfielder

Team information
- Current team: Melbourne Victory
- Number: 2

College career
Years	Team	Apps	(Gls)
2022–2024	Baylor Bears	54	(1)
2025	Kentucky Wildcats	21	(2)

Senior career*
Years	Team	Apps	(Gls)
2026	Minnesota Aurora		
2026–	Melbourne Victory	0	(0)

International career^{‡}
2026–	Philippines	4	(2)
- * Club domestic league appearances and goals ‡ National team caps and goals as of September 29, 2026

Skye Alana Leach is a professional footballer who plays as a midfielder for the Melbourne Victory of the A-League Women. Born in the United States, she plays for the Philippines national team.

== Early life and education ==
Skye Alana Leach was born on August 10, 2003, in Texas in the United States. She is one of three siblings. Leach graduated at Flower Mound High School in 2022. Leach studied at the Baylor University before moving to the University of Kentucky where she pursued a degree in engineering.

== College career ==
Leach played for the Baylor Bears for three season from 2022 to 2024 in the Big 12 Conference before moving to play for the Kentucky Wildcats for her senior year in 2025.

== Club career ==
=== Minnesota Aurora ===
Leach played for the Minnesota Aurora for its 2026 season in the USL W League.

=== Melbourne Victory ===
In September 2026, the Melbourne Victory of the A-League Women announced they have signed in Leach for the 2026–27 season.

== International career ==
Leach was recruited for the Philippine women's national team during the June 2026 identification camp of the Philippine Football Federation in San Diego. She later debuted for the Philippines at the women's football tournament of the 2026 Asian Games in Aichi and Nagoya, Japan. She made her first international goal in the Philippines' 2–0 win over Hong Kong.

== Career statistics ==
=== International ===
Scores and results list the Philippines' goal tally first, score column indicates score after each Leah goal.

List of international goals scored by Skye Leah
No.	Date	Venue	Opponent	Score	Result	Competition	Ref.
1	September 17, 2026	Gifu Nagaragawa Stadium, Gifu, Japan	Hong Kong	1–0	2–0	2026 Asian Games	
2	September 21, 2026	Gifu Nagaragawa Stadium, Gifu, Japan	China	1–4	1–5	2026 Asian Games	
