= Yoon Su-jeong =

South Korean footballer (born 2002)

Personal information
- Date of birth: June 20, 2002 (age 24)
- Height: 1.68 m (5 ft 6 in)
- Positions: Forward; midfielder

Team information
- Current team: Suwon FC
- Number: 26

Youth career
- 2018-2020: Hwacheon Information Industry H.S.
- Tongwon University

Senior career*
Years	Team	Apps	(Gls)
2024	Changnyeong WFC		
2025-	Suwon FC		

International career^{‡}
2026-	South Korea	7	(5)
- * Club domestic league appearances and goals ‡ National team caps and goals as of 21:10, 29 September 2026 (UTC)

Yoon Su-jeong (Korean: 윤수정, born 20 June 2002) is a South Korean professional footballer who plays for WK League side Suwon FC and the South Korean national team.

== Club career ==
Yoon was selected by Changnyeong WFC at the 2024 WK League new players draft. In the 2024 season she made 19 appearances for Changnyeong, demonstrating her versatility by playing in a variety of attacking and defensive positions. She transferred to Suwon FC ahead of the 2025 season. In her first season at Suwon, Yoon made 14 league appearances, playing primarily in a more attacking role, but scored only one goal. However, in 2026 she became a more regular fixture of Suwon's squad, and recorded several goals and assists.

== International career ==
At the end of the 2025 season, Yoon took part in a South Korea U-23 training camp aimed at developing upcoming talent caught in the age gap between the country's youth teams and its senior squad. She was called up to South Korea's national team for the first time in 2026 ahead of the preliminary round of the 2028 EAFF E-1 Football Championship. She scored a brace against Chinese Taipei in the final of the preliminary round, helping South Korea secure qualification for the main tournament in 2028. Yoon represented South Korea at the 2026 Asian Games, scoring in the side's final group stage match against North Korea.

== Career statistics ==
=== International ===
As of 29 September 2026

South Korea
Year	Apps	Goals
2026	7	5
Total	7	5

==== International goals ====
Scores and results list South Korea's goal tally first.

List of international goals scored by Yoon Su-jeong
No.	Date	Venue	Opponent	Score	Result	Competition	Ref.
1.	9 June 2026	GFA National Training Center, Dededo, Guam	Chinese Taipei	1–0	5–3 (a.e.t.)	2028 EAFF E-1 Football Championship preliminary round	
2.	9 June 2026	GFA National Training Center, Dededo, Guam	Chinese Taipei	3–2	5–3 (a.e.t.)	2028 EAFF E-1 Football Championship preliminary round	
3.	21 September 2026	Shizuoka Stadium, Fukuroi, Japan	North Korea	1–1	1–1	2026 Asian Games	
4.	25 September 2026	Nagai Stadium, Osaka, Japan	Uzbekistan	1–0	6–3	2026 Asian Games	
5.	25 September 2026	Nagai Stadium, Osaka, Japan	Uzbekistan	3–1	6–3	2026 Asian Games	
