= Natalie Collins =

Filipino footballer (born 2007)

Personal information
- Full name: Natalie Kirsten Sim Collins
- Date of birth: May 28, 2007 (age 19)
- Height: 5 ft 4 in (1.63 m)
- Positions: Midfielder; forward

Team information
- Current team: Boise State Broncos
- Number: 2

Youth career
- Heat FC ECNL
- Liberty Patriots

College career
Years	Team	Apps	(Gls)
2025–	Boise State Broncos	6	(0)

International career^{‡}
2024	Philippines U17	5	(2)
2026–	Philippines	3	(1)
- ‡ National team caps and goals as of September 25, 2026

Natalie Kirsten Sim Collins (born May 28, 2007) is a Filipino association football player who plays as a midfielder or forward for the Boise State Broncos and the Philippines national team.

== High school career ==
Attending the Liberty High School in Nevada, Collins was a three-year varsity starter for the school's soccer team from 2022 to 2024.

== College career ==
Collins has been playing for the Boise State Broncos women's soccer team since her freshman year in 2025.

== International career ==
Natalie Collins has played for the Philippines women's national team. She has played for the under-17 girls team at the 2024 AFC U17 Women's Asian Cup in Indonesia. She later debuted for the senior team at the football tournament of the 2026 Asian Games in Japan where she scored the late equalizer in the 1–1 draw against Uzbekistan.

== Career statistics ==
=== International ===
As of match played September 25, 2026

Appearances and goals by national team and year
National team	Year	Apps	Goals
Philippines	2026	3	1
Total		3	1

Scores and results list Philippine's goal tally first, score column indicates score after each Collins goal.

List of international goals scored by Natalie Collins
No.	Date	Venue	Opponent	Score	Result	Competition
1.	September 14, 2026	Gifu Nagaragawa Stadium, Gifu, Japan	Uzbekistan	1–1	1–1	2026 Asian Games
