= Juri Ito =

Japanese footballer

Personal information
- Full name: Juri Ito
- Date of birth: 2 October 2002 (age 24)
- Place of birth: Mie Prefecture, Japan
- Height: 1.62 m (5 ft 4 in)
- Position: Midfielder

Team information
- Current team: Nojima Stella Kanagawa Sagamihara
- Number: 15

Senior career*
Years	Team	Apps	(Gls)
2021–	Nojima Stella Kanagawa Sagamihara		

International career
2026–	Japan		
Medal record
Representing Japan
Women's football
Asian Games
Gold medal – first place	2026 Aichi-Nagoya	Women's tournament
- * Club domestic league appearances and goals

Juri Ito (Japanese: 伊東珠梨; born 2 October 2002) is a Japanese professional footballer who plays as a midfielder for Nojima Stella Kanagawa Sagamihara and the Japan women's national football team.

== Club career ==
Ito began her senior career with Nojima Stella Kanagawa Sagamihara in 2021. She has played in Japan's top-level women's football competition, the WE League.

== International career ==
Ito was selected for the Japan women's national team squad for the 2026 Asian Games, held in Aichi-Nagoya, Japan.

She appeared in several matches during the tournament, playing in defence and midfield. In Japan's 8–0 group-stage victory over Vietnam on 17 September, she started the match and delivered the corner that led to Yuzuho Shiokoshi's goal. Ito also started in Japan's semi-final victory over South Korea and the final against North Korea.

Japan won the gold medal after defeating North Korea in a penalty shoot-out in the final on 2 October 2026, following a 2–2 draw after extra time. Ito was part of the gold-medal-winning squad.
