= Yūki Seno =

Japanese footballer

Yuki Seno
Personal information
- Date of birth: 30 December 1996 (age 29)
- Place of birth: Saitama Prefecture, Japan
- Height: 1.68 m (5 ft 6 in)
- Position: Midfielder

Team information
- Current team: Chifure AS Elfen Saitama
- Number: 6

Senior career*
Years	Team	Apps	(Gls)
2021–	Chifure AS Elfen Saitama		

International career
2026-	Japan	4	(0)
- * Club domestic league appearances and goals

Yuki Seno (born 30 December 1996) is a Japanese professional footballer who plays as a midfielder for WE League club Chifure AS Elfen Saitama.

== Club career ==
Seno made her WE League debut on 12 September 2021.
