= Ri Song-a =

North Korean footballer (born 1999)

Personal information
- Date of birth: 22 June 1999 (age 27)
- Place of birth: Osaka Prefecture, Japan
- Height: 1.67 m (5 ft 6 in)
- Position: Forward

Team information
- Current team: Sanfrecce Hiroshima Regina
- Number: 30

Senior career*
Years	Team	Apps	(Gls)
2015–2017	Cerezo Osaka Yanmar Ladies	16	(1)
2018–2023	Nittaidai SMG Yokohama	40	(13)
2024–	Sanfrecce Hiroshima Regina		

International career
2016	North Korea U17	3	(0)
2026–	North Korea	5	(2)
- * Club domestic league appearances and goals

Ri Song-a (Japanese: 李誠雅; Korean: 리성아; born 22 June 1999) is a professional footballer who plays as a forward for Sanfrecce Hiroshima Regina. Born in Japan, she is a North Korea international.

== Early life ==
Ri was born on 22 June 1999. Born in Osaka Prefecture, Japan, she grew up in the prefecture. Growing up, she attended Nippon Sport Science University in Japan.

== Club career ==
Ri started her career with Japanese side Cerezo Osaka Yanmar Ladies in 2015, where she made sixteen league appearances and scored one goal. Ahead of the 2018 season, she signed for Japanese side Nittaidai SMG Yokohama, where she made forty league appearances and scored thirteen goals. Following her stint there, she signed for Japanese side Sanfrecce Hiroshima Regina in 2024, helping the club win the 2024–25 WE League Cup.

== International career ==
Ri is a North Korea international. During the spring of 2026, she played for the North Korea women's national football team at the 2026 AFC Women's Asian Cup.

== International goals ==
No.	Date	Venue	Opponent	Score	Result	Competition
1.	14 September 2026	Nagai Stadium, Osaka, Japan	Bangladesh	8–0	10–0	2026 Asian Games
2.	17 September 2026	Nagai Stadium, Osaka, Japan	Myanmar	2–0	8–0	2026 Asian Games

== Style of play ==
Ri plays as a forward. Japanese news website Yahoo Japan wrote in 2021 that she "leads the team with a variety of plays and goals, including speedy movements and ball keeping up front".
