= Nanasa Ikuta =

Japanese footballer (born 2003)

Nanasa Ikuta 生田 七彩
Personal information
- Date of birth: September 24, 2003 (age 23)
- Place of birth: Kumamoto, Japan
- Height: 1.61 m (5 ft 3 1/2 in)
- Position: Forward

Team information
- Current team: Chifure AS Elfen Saitama
- Number: 10

Youth career
- Kumamoto United SC A-ma
- Kumamoto United SC Flora
- 2019–2021: Sakuyo Gakuen High School

College career
Years	Team	Apps	(Gls)
2022–2026	Waseda University		

Senior career*
Years	Team	Apps	(Gls)
2025–	Chifure AS Elfen Saitama	11	(5)

International career^{‡}
2026–	Japan	4	(1)
Medal record
Representing Japan
Asian Games
Gold medal – first place	2026 Aichi–Nagoya
- * Club domestic league appearances and goals as of 1 June 2026 (UTC) ‡ National team caps and goals as of 2 October 2026 (UTC)

Nanasa Ikuta (生田 七彩, Ikuta Nanasa; born September 24, 2003) is a Japanese professional footballer who plays as a forward for Chifure AS Elfen Saitama in the WE League and the Japan national team.

== College career ==
Until high school, Ikuta excelled in both football and sprinting.

After graduating from Sakuyo Gakuen High School, Ikuta enrolled at Waseda University, where she played with the university's football club. In her first two years at university, she tore her ACL three times, each resulting in an eight-month absence from the game.

On July 25, 2025, Ikuta was signed by Chifure AS Elfen Saitama, becoming a special designated player in the process.

== Club career ==
In February 2026, Ikuta officially joined Chifure AS Elfen Saitama. In her first match after joining, on February 14 against AC Nagano Parceiro Ladies, in the 15th round, she scored two goals, which were her first league goals. She went on to have a successful 2025–26 season, scoring 5 goals in 11 matches.

For the 2026–27 season, Ikuta was given the number 10 jersey, despite being only in her second year.

== International career ==
On July 27, 2026, Ikuta was called up to the Japan national team to compete at the 2026 Asian Games. On September 21, she scored her first international goal, which came on the 58th minute in a 4–0 victory over Chinese Taipei. Her team went on to win the gold medal by beating North Korea in the final on penalties.

== International goals ==
No.	Date	Venue	Opponent	Score	Result	Competition
1.	21 September 2026	Shizuoka Stadium, Fukuroi, Japan	Chinese Taipei	4–0	4–0	2026 Asian Games

== Honours ==
Japan

- Asian Games: 2026
