= Hikaru Yūmura =

Japanese footballer

Hikaru Yumura
Personal information
- Date of birth: 18 October 1997 (age 29)
- Place of birth: Osaka Prefecture, Japan
- Height: 1.62 m (5 ft 4 in)
- Position: Midfielder

Team information
- Current team: Nojima Stella
- Number: 29

Senior career*
Years	Team	Apps	(Gls)
2018–2025	Chifure AS Elfen Saitama	112	(23)
2025–	Nojima Stella		

International career^{‡}
2026–	Japan	2	(1)
- * Club domestic league appearances and goals ‡ National team caps and goals as of 17 September 2026

Hikaru Yumura (born 18 October 1997) is a Japanese professional footballer who plays as a midfielder for WE League club Nojima Stella Kanagawa Sagamihara.

== Club career ==
Yumura made her WE League debut on 12 September 2021.

== International goals ==
No.	Date	Venue	Opponent	Score	Result	Competition
1.	17 September 2026	Shizuoka Stadium, Fukuroi, Japan	Vietnam	8–0	8–0	2026 Asian Games
