= Chiina Kamiya =

Japanese footballer (born 2001)

Personal information
- Date of birth: March 19, 2001 (age 25)
- Place of birth: Nisshin, Aichi, Japan
- Height: 1.65 m (5 ft 5 in)
- Position: Forward

Team information
- Current team: Sanfrecce Hiroshima Regina
- Number: 17

Senior career*
Years	Team	Apps	(Gls)
2020	Iga FC Kunoichi Mie	0	(0)
2021−2023	Asahi Intecc Loveledge Nagoya	33	(20)
2024	Tokyo Verdy Beleza	14	(5)
2024−2025	Iga FC Kunoichi Mie	22	(15)
2026−	Sanfrecce Hiroshima Regina	8	(2)

International career^{‡}
2017	Japan U16	1	(0)
2018	Japan U17	5	(0)
2026−	Japan	6	(7)
Medal record
Representing Japan
Asian Games
Gold medal – first place	2026 Aichi–Nagoya
- * Club domestic league appearances and goals ‡ National team caps and goals as of 2 October 2026

Chiina Kamiya (神谷 千菜, Kamiya Chiina; born March 19, 2001) is a Japanese professional footballer who plays as a forward for Sanfrecce Hiroshima Regina and the Japan national team.

== Club career ==
=== Asahi Intecc Loveledge Nagoya ===
Kamiya spent the 2021 and 2022 seasons with the Asahi Intecc Loveledge Nagoya as designated special player, and on January 7, 2023, she joined them on a permanent contract. Despite being a rookie, she played in every match, winning the top goalscorer award, the Fighting Spirit Award, and the Best Eleven in the 2023 season.

=== Tokyo Verdy Beleza and Iga FC Kunoichi Mie ===
On December 27, 2023, Tokyo Verdy Beleza announced that they had signed Kamiya on a permanent transfer. She made a spectacular WE League debut on March 3, 2024, in the 8th round of the 2023–24 season against Nojima Stella Kanagawa Sagamihara, where she was given a starting position and scored two goals. She finished the season with 14 appearances and 5 goals, and on July 8, she renewed her contract with Beleza for the 2024–25 season. On September 7, however, before the season was about to start, her contract with Beleza was terminated by mutual agreement at her request.

On October 3, 2024, it was announced that Kamiya had joined Iga FC Kunoichi Mie.

=== Sanfrecce Hiroshima Regina ===
On January 10, 2026, Sanfrecce Hiroshima Regina announced they had signed Kamiya on a permanent transfer.

== International career ==
On July 27, 2026, Kamiya was called up to the Japan national team to compete at the 2026 Asian Games. She made her senior debut in Japan's opening game in the 2026 Asian Games, where she scored her first goal in a 8–0 win against Thailand on September 14. On September 17, she scored her next two goals in 8–0 victory over Vietnam. On September 21, she scored her third goal, which came on the 20th minute in a 4–0 victory over Chinese Taipei. In the quarterfinals, Kamiya scored her next goal in a 4–0 victory over the Philippines. She scored her final two goals in the tournament in the semifinals in a 2–0 victory over South Korea, after which her team went on to win the gold medal by beating North Korea in the final on penalties.

=== International goals ===
As of match played 2 October 2026

Appearances and goals by national team and year
National Team	Year	Apps	Goals
Japan	2026	6	7
Total		6	7

Scores and results list Japan's goal tally first, score column indicates score after each Kamiya goal.

List of international goals scored by Chiina Kamiya
No.	Date	Venue	Opponent	Score	Result	Competition	Ref.
1	14 September 2026	Shizuoka Stadium, Fukuroi, Japan	Thailand	2–0	8–0	2026 Asian Games	
2	17 September 2026	Shizuoka Stadium, Fukuroi, Japan	Vietnam	1–0	8–0	2026 Asian Games	
3	17 September 2026	Shizuoka Stadium, Fukuroi, Japan	Vietnam	5–0	8–0	2026 Asian Games	
4	21 September 2026	Shizuoka Stadium, Fukuroi, Japan	Chinese Taipei	2–0	4–0	2026 Asian Games	
5	25 September 2026	Shizuoka Stadium, Fukuroi, Japan	Philippines	4–0	4–0	2026 Asian Games	
6	29 September 2026	Shizuoka Stadium, Fukuroi, Japan	South Korea	1–0	2–0	2026 Asian Games	
7	29 September 2026	Shizuoka Stadium, Fukuroi, Japan	South Korea	2–0	2–0	2026 Asian Games	

== Honours ==
Japan

- Asian Games:

Champions: 2026

Individual

- Nadeshiko League Top Scorer: 2023
- Nadeshiko League Fighting Spirit Award: 2023
- Nadeshiko League Best Eleven: 2023
