= Football at the 2026 Asian Games – Women's tournament =

Women's Football Tournament at the 2026 Asian Games

Tournament details
- Host country: Japan
- Dates: 14 September – 2 October 2026
- Teams: 12
- Venues: 4 (in 4 host cities)

Final positions
- Champions: Japan (4th title)
- Runners-up: North Korea
- Third place: South Korea
- Fourth place: China

Tournament statistics
- Matches played: 26
- Goals scored: 105 (4.04 per match)
- Attendance: 26,056 (1,002 per match)
- Top scorer(s): (Japan) Chiina Kamiya (7 goals)

The women's football tournament at the 2026 Asian Games was played from 14 September to 2 October 2026 in Fukuroi, Osaka, Gifu and Kariya in Japan.

Japan were the two-time defending champions, and successfully defended the title beating North Korea in the final on penalties. Japan won the record-breaking fourth Asian Games title in women's football.

== Competition schedule ==
All times are local Japan Standard Time (UTC+9).

G	Group stage	1/4	Quarter-finals	1/2	Semi-finals	B	Bronze medal match	F	Gold medal match

Date Event	Mon 14	Tue 15	Wed 16	Thu 17	Fri 18	Sat 19	Sun 20	Mon 21	Tue 22	Wed 23	Thu 24	Fri 25	Sat 26	Sun 27	Mon 28	Tue 29	Wed 30	Thu 1	Fri 2	
Women	G			G				G				1/4				1/2			B	F

== Venues ==
Four venues across four cities were used for the tournament.

Shizuoka Stadium hostsed the final.

Fukuroi	Osaka
Shizuoka Stadium	Nagai Stadium
Capacity: 50,889	Capacity: 47,853
Football at the 2026 Asian Games – Women's tournament is located in Central Japan
Gifu	Kariya
Gifu Nagaragawa Stadium	Wave Stadium Kariya
Capacity: 26,109	Capacity: 2,602

== Draw ==
The draw for the tournament was held on 23 July 2026.

Pot 1	Pot 2	Pot 3	Pot 4
1. Japan; 2. South Korea; 3. China	4. Chinese Taipei; 5. North Korea; 6. Philippines	7. Vietnam; 8. Bangladesh; 9. Uzbekistan	10. Thailand; 11. Myanmar; 12. Hong Kong

== Group stage ==
All times are local, Japan Standard Time (UTC+9).

=== Group E ===
Pos	Team	Pld	W	D	L	GF	GA	GD	Pts	Qualification
1	Japan (H)	3	3	0	0	20	0	+20	9	Advance to knockout stage
2	Chinese Taipei	3	2	0	1	3	5	−2	6	Advance to knockout stage
3	Vietnam	3	0	1	2	1	10	−9	1	Advance to knockout stage
4	Thailand	3	0	1	2	0	9	−9	1	

Source: Aichi–Nagoya 26
(H) Hosts
14 September 2026
16:00

Chinese Taipei	2–1	Vietnam
Su Yu-hsuan 16'; Wakabayashi 81'	Report	Nguyễn Thị Thanh Nhã 86'

Shizuoka Stadium, Fukuroi
Attendance: 352
Referee: Park Se-jin (South Korea)
14 September 2026
19:30

Japan	8–0	Thailand
Nakashima 3', 37', 41'; Kamiya 30'; Takarada 70', 74', 79'; Sakakibara 88'	Report

Shizuoka Stadium, Fukuroi
Attendance: 1,202
Referee: Nurul Ain Izatty Zainal (Malaysia)

17 September 2026
16:00

Thailand	0–1	Chinese Taipei
	Report	Tanaka 78'

Shizuoka Stadium, Fukuroi
Attendance: 277
Referee: Rawdha Al-Mansoori (United Arab Emirates)
17 September 2026
19:30

Vietnam	0–8	Japan
	Report	Kamiya 12', 52'; Shiokoshi 19'; Cù Thị Huỳnh Như 43' (o.g.); Hamada 45+3'; Nishio 78'; Narumiya 81'; Yumura 90+2'

Shizuoka Stadium, Fukuroi
Attendance: 1,029
Referee: Esraa Al-Mbaiden (Jordan)

21 September 2026
19:30

Japan	4–0	Chinese Taipei
Takarada 7' (pen.); Kamiya 20'; Ueno 51'; Ikuta 58'	Report

Shizuoka Stadium, Fukuroi
Attendance: 3,679
Referee: Khin Nyein Chan (Myanmar)
21 September 2026
19:30

Vietnam	0–0	Thailand
	Report

Nagai Stadium, Osaka
Attendance: 483
Referee: Veronika Bernatskaia (Kyrgyzstan)

=== Group F ===
Pos	Team	Pld	W	D	L	GF	GA	GD	Pts	Qualification
1	North Korea	3	2	1	0	19	1	+18	7	Advance to knockout stage
2	South Korea	3	2	1	0	12	1	+11	7	Advance to knockout stage
3	Myanmar	3	0	1	2	0	13	−13	1	
4	Bangladesh	3	0	1	2	0	16	−16	1	

Source: Aichi–Nagoya 26
14 September 2026
16:00

North Korea	10–0	Bangladesh
Jon Ryong-jong 5', 10'; Hwang Yu-yong 12'; Chae Un-yong 18', 35'; Kim Kyong-yong 40', 43'; Ri Song-a 51'; Jong Kum 60'; Han Jin-hong 90'	Report

Nagai Stadium, Osaka
Attendance: 1,343
Referee: Plong Pich Akara (Cambodia)
14 September 2026
19:30

South Korea	5–0	Myanmar
Kim Min-ji 29', 33', 59'; Jang Sel-gi 38'; Choe Yu-ri 76'	Report

Nagai Stadium, Osaka
Attendance: 500
Referee: Tian Jin (China)

17 September 2026
16:00

Bangladesh	0–6	South Korea
	Report	Kim Min-ji 16'; Jeong Da-bin 42'; Choe Yu-ri 65'; Ji So-yun 77'; Hyun Seul-gi 79'; Ko Yoo-jin 90+1'

Nagai Stadium, Osaka
Attendance: 135
Referee: Fatemeh Nasiri Looshani (Iran)
17 September 2026
19:30

Myanmar	0–8	North Korea
	Report	Ri Myong-gum 10'; Ri Song-a 18' (pen.); Khin Marlar Tun 37' (o.g.); Jon Ryong-jong 40', 42'; Choe Kum-ok 58', 77'; Jong Kum 66'

Nagai Stadium, Osaka
Attendance: 885
Referee: Mu Mingxin (China)

21 September 2026
16:00

South Korea	1–1	North Korea
Yoon Su-jeong 46'	Report	Chae Un-yong 35'

Shizuoka Stadium, Fukuroi
Attendance: 2,032
Referee: Supiree Testhomya (Thailand)
21 September 2026
16:00

Bangladesh	0–0	Myanmar
	Report

Nagai Stadium, Osaka
Attendance: 571
Referee: Roziyabonu Yusupova (Uzbekistan)

=== Group G ===
Pos	Team	Pld	W	D	L	GF	GA	GD	Pts	Qualification
1	China	3	2	1	0	11	3	+8	7	Advance to knockout stage
2	Uzbekistan	3	1	2	0	4	3	+1	5	Advance to knockout stage
3	Philippines	3	1	1	1	4	6	−2	4	Advance to knockout stage
4	Hong Kong	3	0	0	3	2	9	−7	0	

Source: Aichi–Nagoya 26
14 September 2026
14:00

Philippines	1–1	Uzbekistan
Collins 89'	Report	Egamberdieva 81'

Gifu Nagaragawa Stadium, Gifu
Attendance: 202
Referee: Lê Thị Ly (Vietnam)
14 September 2026
19:00

China	5–1	Hong Kong
Chen Qiaozhu 14'; Si Yu 38'; Wang Yanwen 48'; Wang Shuang 80', 89'	Report	Cheung Wai Ki 31'

Gifu Nagaragawa Stadium, Gifu
Attendance: 179
Referee: Khin Nyein Chan (Myanmar)

17 September 2026
14:00

Uzbekistan	1–1	China
Dadaboeva 42'	Report	Zhang Linyan 70'

Gifu Nagaragawa Stadium, Gifu
Attendance: 226
Referee: Azusa Sugino (Japan)
17 September 2026
19:00

Hong Kong	0–2	Philippines
	Report	Leach 12'; Ramirez 63'

Gifu Nagaragawa Stadium, Gifu
Attendance: 189
Referee: Haneen Murad (Jordan)

21 September 2026
16:00

China	5–1	Philippines
Wang Yanwen 20', 40', 54'; Chen Qiaozhu 49'; Yuan Cong 90+2'	Report	Leach 65'

Gifu Nagaragawa Stadium, Gifu
Attendance: 1,022
Referee: Esraa Almbaiden (Jordan)
21 September 2026
16:00

Uzbekistan	2–1	Hong Kong
Khabibullaeva 34'; Shoyimova 90+2'	Report	Wei Lan 65'

Wave Stadium Kariya, Kariya
Attendance: 561
Referee: Park Se-jin (South Korea)

=== Ranking of third-placed teams ===
Pos	Grp	Team	Pld	W	D	L	GF	GA	GD	Pts	Qualification
1	G	Philippines	3	1	1	1	4	6	−2	4	Advance to knockout stage
2	E	Vietnam	3	0	1	2	1	10	−9	1	Advance to knockout stage
3	F	Myanmar	3	0	1	2	0	13	−13	1	

Source: Aichi–Nagoya 26

== Knockout stage ==
All times are local, Japan Standard Time (UTC+9).

=== Bracket ===
Quarter-finals
25 September – Fukuroi
North Korea	5
Chinese Taipei	1
25 September – Osaka
China (a.e.t.)	1
Vietnam	0
25 September – Fukuroi
Japan	4
Philippines	0
25 September – Osaka
South Korea	6
Uzbekistan	3

Semi-finals
29 September – Fukuroi
North Korea	2
China	0
29 September – Fukuroi
Japan	2
South Korea	0

Gold medal match
2 October – Fukuroi
North Korea	2 (3)
Japan (p)	2 (5)
Bronze medal match
2 October – Fukuroi
China	0
South Korea	1

=== Quarter-finals ===
25 September 2026
15:00

North Korea	5–1	Chinese Taipei
Song Chun-sim 21'; Myong Yu-jong 29'; Kim Kyong-yong 34'; Choe Kum-ok 64'; Kim Song-gyong 86'	Report	Chen Yu-chin 90+2'

Shizuoka Stadium, Fukuroi
Attendance: 477
Referee: Veronika Bernatskaia (Kyrgyzstan)

25 September 2026
19:30

Japan	4–0	Philippines
Takarada 2', 36'; Ueno 26'; Kamiya 45+2'	Report

Shizuoka Stadium, Fukuroi
Attendance: 1,084
Referee: Esraa Al-Mbaiden (Jordan)

25 September 2026
15:00

China	1–0 (a.e.t.)	Vietnam
Wang Shuang 109'	Report

Nagai Stadium, Osaka
Attendance: 252
Referee: Azusa Sugino (Japan)

25 September 2026
19:30

South Korea	6–3	Uzbekistan
Yoon Su-jeong 6', 44'; Choe Yu-ri 17', 45+1'; Khabibullaeva 74' (o.g.); Kim Min-ji 90+4'	Report	Khabibullaeva 10'; Jang Sel-gi 64' (o.g.); Kudratova 66'

Nagai Stadium, Osaka
Attendance: 240
Referee: Mu Mingxin (China)

=== Semi-finals ===
29 September 2026
15:00

North Korea	2–0	China
Yao Wei 53' (o.g.); Myong Yu-jong 79'	Report

Shizuoka Stadium, Fukuroi
Attendance: 564
Referee: Veronika Bernatskaia (Kyrgyzstan)
29 September 2026
19:30

Japan	2–0	South Korea
Kamiya 54', 63'	Report

Shizuoka Stadium, Fukuroi
Attendance: 998
Referee: Lê Thị Ly (Vietnam)

=== Bronze medal match ===
2 October 2026
15:00

China	0–1	South Korea (bronze)
	Report	Noh Jin-young 4'

Shizuoka Stadium, Fukuroi
Attendance: 1,331
Referee: Rawdha Al-Mansoori (United Arab Emirates)

=== Gold medal match ===
2 October 2026
19:30

(silver) North Korea	2–2 (a.e.t.)	Japan (gold)
Jong Kum 47'; Jon Ryong-jong 69'	Report	Ueno 32'; Nishio 86'
Penalties
Myong Yu-jong (penalty scored); Jon Ryong-jong (penalty scored); Jong Kum (penalty missed); Ri Hye-gyong (penalty scored)	3–5	(penalty scored) Takarada; (penalty scored) Mizuno; (penalty scored) Kuwahara; (penalty scored) Nishio; (penalty scored) Shiokoshi

Shizuoka Stadium, Fukuroi
Attendance: 6,243
Referee: Supiree Testhomya (Thailand)

== Final standing ==
As per statistical convention in football, matches decided in extra time are counted as wins and losses, while matches decided by penalty shoot-outs are counted as draws.

Standings:

Pos	Team	Pld	W	D	L	GF	GA	GD	Pts	Final result
1	Japan	6	5	1	0	28	2	+26	16	Gold medal
2	North Korea	6	4	2	0	28	4	+24	14	Silver medal
3	South Korea	6	4	1	1	19	6	+13	13	Bronze medal
4	China	6	3	1	2	12	6	+6	10	Fourth place
5	Chinese Taipei	4	2	0	2	4	10	−6	6	Eliminated in quarter-finals
6	Uzbekistan	4	1	2	1	7	9	−2	5	Eliminated in quarter-finals
7	Philippines	4	1	1	2	4	10	−6	4	Eliminated in quarter-finals
8	Vietnam	4	0	1	3	1	11	−10	1	Eliminated in quarter-finals
9	Thailand	3	0	1	2	0	9	−9	1	Eliminated in group stage
10	Myanmar	3	0	1	2	0	13	−13	1	Eliminated in group stage
11	Bangladesh	3	0	1	2	0	16	−16	1	Eliminated in group stage
12	Hong Kong	3	0	0	3	2	9	−7	0	Eliminated in group stage

== Goalscorers ==
There were 105 goals scored in 26 matches, for an average of 4.04 goals per match.

7 goals

- (Japan) Chiina Kamiya

6 goals

- (Japan) Saori Takarada

5 goals

- (South Korea) Kim Min-ji
- (North Korea) Jon Ryong-jong

4 goals

- (China) Wang Yanwen
- (South Korea) Choe Yu-ri

3 goals

- (China) Wang Shuang
- (Japan) Mami Ueno
- (Japan) Yoshino Nakashima
- (North Korea) Chae Un-yong
- (North Korea) Choe Kum-ok
- (North Korea) Kim Kyong-yong
- (North Korea) Jong Kum
- (South Korea) Yoon Su-jeong

2 goals

- (China) Chen Qiaozhu
- (Japan) Hanon Nishio
- (North Korea) Myong Yu-jong
- (North Korea) Ri Song-a
- (Philippines) Skye Leach
- (Uzbekistan) Diyorakhon Khabibullaeva

1 goal

- (China) Si Yu
- (China) Zhang Linyan
- (China) Yuan Cong
- (Hong Kong) Cheung Wai Ki
- (Hong Kong) Wei Lan
- (Japan) Nanasa Ikuta
- (Japan) Kotono Sakakibara
- (Japan) Yuzuho Shiokoshi
- (Japan) Megu Hamada
- (Japan) Yui Narumiya
- (Japan) Hikaru Yumura
- (North Korea) Ri Myong-gum
- (North Korea) Hwang Yu-yong
- (North Korea) Han Jin-hong
- (North Korea) Kim Song-gyong
- (North Korea) Song Chun-sim
- (Philippines) Natalie Collins
- (Philippines) Mallie Ramirez
- (South Korea) Noh Jin-young
- (South Korea) Jang Sel-gi
- (South Korea) Jeong Da-bin
- (South Korea) Ji So-yun
- (South Korea) Hyun Seul-gi
- (South Korea) Ko Yoo-jin
- (Chinese Taipei) Chen Yu-chin
- (Chinese Taipei) Su Yu-hsuan
- (Chinese Taipei) Minori Wakabayashi
- (Chinese Taipei) Maho Tanaka
- (Uzbekistan) Maftuna Shoyimova
- (Uzbekistan) Mehribon Egamberdieva
- (Uzbekistan) Nilufar Kudratova
- (Uzbekistan) Kholida Dadaboeva
- (Vietnam) Nguyễn Thị Thanh Nhã

1 own goal

- (Vietnam) Cù Thị Huỳnh Như (against Japan)
- (China) Yao Wei (against North Korea)
- (Myanmar) Khin Marlar Tun (against North Korea)
- (South Korea) Jang Sel-gi (against Uzbekistan)
- (Uzbekistan) Diyorakhon Khabibullaeva (against South Korea)

== See also ==
- Football at the 2026 Asian Games – Men's tournament
