= Yuzuho Shiokoshi =

Japanese footballer (born 1997)

Personal information
- Date of birth: 1 November 1997 (age 29)
- Place of birth: Kawagoe, Saitama, Japan
- Height: 1.66 m (5 ft 5 in)
- Position: Midfielder

Team information
- Current team: Nippon TV Tokyo Verdy Beleza
- Number: 19

Youth career
- Takashina 11s
- –2009: Kawagoe SC
- 2010–2016: Urawa Reds

Senior career*
Years	Team	Apps	(Gls)
2014–2015	Urawa Reds Youth		(9)
2016–2025	Urawa Reds	134	(17)
2025–	Nippon TV Tokyo Verdy Beleza	22	(9)

International career^{‡}
2016	Japan U20	1	(0)
2021	Japan	13	(3)
- * Club domestic league appearances and goals as of 1 June 2026 ‡ National team caps and goals as of 30 September 2026

Yuzuho Shiokoshi (塩越 柚歩, Shiokoshi Yuzuho; born 1 November 1997) is a Japanese footballer who plays as a midfielder for Urawa Reds in the WE League. She has also played for the Japan national team.

== Career statistics ==
=== Club ===
Club	Season	League			National Cup		League Cup		Other		Total	
Club	Season	Division	Apps	Goals	Apps	Goals	Apps	Goals	Apps	Goals	Apps	Goals
Urawa Reds	2016	Nadeshiko League	18	1	2 (Note: Appearances in the Empress's Cup)	0	9 (Note: Appearances in the Nadeshiko League Cup)	0	0	0	29	1
Urawa Reds	2017	Nadeshiko League	14	0	1	0	10	1	0	0	25	1
Urawa Reds	2018	Nadeshiko League	4	0	0	0	4	0	0	0	8	0
Urawa Reds	2019	Nadeshiko League	5	0	5	1	0	0	0	0	10	1
Urawa Reds	2020	Nadeshiko League	18	3	4	1	0	0	0	0	22	4
Urawa Reds	2021–22	WE League	0	0	0	0	0	0	0	0	0	0
Career total			59	4	12	2	26	1	0	0	97	7

=== International ===
As of matches played September 17, 2026.

National Team	Year	Apps	Goals
Japan
Japan	2021	5	2
Japan	2024	1	0
Japan	2025	2	0
Japan	2026	5	1
Total		13	3

=== International goals ===
Scores and results list Japan's goal tally first.

No	Date	Venue	Opponent	Score	Result	Competition
1.	10 June 2021	Edion Stadium Hiroshima, Hiroshima, Japan	Ukraine	1–0	8–0	Friendly
2.	10 June 2021	Edion Stadium Hiroshima, Hiroshima, Japan	Ukraine	4–0	8–0	Friendly
3.	17 September 2026	Shizuoka Stadium, Fukuroi, Japan	Vietnam	2–0	8–0	2026 Asian Games
