= Megu Hamada =

Japanese footballer

Personal information
- Date of birth: 27 December 2000
- Place of birth: Tokyo, Japan
- Height: 1.62 m (5 ft 4 in)
- Position: Forward

Team information
- Current team: RB Omiya Ardija Women
- Number: 7

Youth career
- Soleil FC
- Kita-ku Sakura Girls
- Jumonji Junior High School
- Jumonji High School

College career
Years	Team	Apps	(Gls)
2019–2023	Yamanashi Gakuin University		

Senior career*
Years	Team	Apps	(Gls)
2023–2025	Nojima Stella Kanagawa Sagamihara		
2025–	RB Omiya Ardija Women		

International career
2025–	Japan	7	(1)
Medal record
Representing Japan
Asian Games
Gold medal – first place	2026 Aichi-Nagoya	Women's football
- * Club domestic league appearances and goals

Megu Hamada (Japanese: 浜田 芽来, born 27 December 2000) is a Japanese professional footballer who plays as a forward for RB Omiya Ardija Women in the WE League and the Japan national team. She was part of the Japan squad that won the women's football gold medal at the 2026 Asian Games.

== Career ==
Hamada was born in Tokyo, Japan. She played youth football for Soleil FC and Kita-ku Sakura Girls before attending Jumonji Junior High School and Jumonji High School. She later played for the women's football team at Yamanashi Gakuin University.

In 2023, Hamada joined Nojima Stella Kanagawa Sagamihara after graduating from university. She made her WE League debut on 5 March 2023 and scored her first league goal on the same day. She subsequently moved to RB Omiya Ardija Women, continuing her career in Japan's top division of women's football.

In July 2026, Hamada was selected for Japan's squad for the women's football tournament at the 2026 Asian Games. She played as a forward during the tournament, including in Japan's semi-final victory over South Korea and the final against North Korea. Japan drew 2–2 after extra time in the final on 2 October and won the penalty shoot-out 5–3 to secure its third consecutive Asian Games gold medal.

== International goals ==
No.	Date	Venue	Opponent	Score	Result	Competition
1.	17 September 2026	Shizuoka Stadium, Fukuroi, Japan	Vietnam	4–0	8–0	2026 Asian Games
