= South Korea women's national football team results =

- Win Draw Loss

This article summarizes the outcomes of all matches including FIFA recognised, unofficial and matches played against club teams by the South Korea women's national football team.

== Matches ==
=== 2022 ===
| 21 January 2022 AFC Women's Asian Cup (Group C) | South Korea | 3–0 | Vietnam | Pune, India |
| 19:30 (UTC+5:30) | Ji; Trần (o.g.) | (ESPN) | | Stadium: Shree Shiv Chhatrapati Sports Complex; Attendance: 0 Referee: Qin Liang (China PR) |

| 24 January 2022 AFC Women's Asian Cup (Group C) | Myanmar | 0–2 | South Korea | Pune, India |
| 13:30 (UTC+5:30) | | (ESPN) | Lee 50'; Ji 84' | Stadium: Shree Shiv Chhatrapati Sports Complex; Attendance: 0 Referee: Casey Reibelt (Australia) |

| 27 January 2022 AFC Women's Asian Cup (Group C) | Japan | 1–1 | South Korea | Pune, India |
| 13:30 (UTC+5:30) | Ueki 1' | (ESPN) | Seo 85' | Stadium: Shree Shiv Chhatrapati Sports Complex; Attendance: 0 Referee: Edita Mirabidova (Uzbekistan) |

| 30 January 2022 AFC Women's Asian Cup (Quarter-finals) | Australia | 0–1 | South Korea | Pune, India |
| 13:30 (UTC+5:30) | | (ESPN) | Ji 87' | Stadium: Shree Shiv Chhatrapati Sports Complex; Attendance: 0 Referee: Qin Liang (China PR) |

| 3 February 2022 AFC Women's Asian Cup (Semi-finals) | South Korea | 2–0 | Philippines | Pune, India |
| 13:30 (UTC+5:30) | Cho 4'; Son 34' | (ESPN) | | Stadium: Shree Shiv Chhatrapati Sports Complex; Attendance: 0 Referee: Lara Lee (Australia) |

| 6 February 2022 AFC Women's Asian Cup (Final) | China | 3–2 | South Korea | Navi Mumbai, India |
| 16:30 (UTC+5:30) | Tang 68' (pen.); Zhang 72'; Xiao 90+3' | (ESPN) | Choe 27'; Ji 45+3' (pen.) | Stadium: DY Patil Stadium; Attendance: 0 Referee: Casey Reibelt (Australia) |

| 26 June Friendly | Canada | 0–0 | South Korea | Toronto, Canada |
| 15:00 UTC−4 | | Report | | Stadium: BMO Field |

| 19 July 2022 EAFF Championship | Japan | 2–1 | South Korea | Ibaraki, Japan |
| 16:00 UTC+9 | Miyazawa 33'; Nagano 65' | Report (EAFF); Report (EAFF) | Ji So-yun 59' | Stadium: Kashima Soccer Stadium; Attendance: 2,200; Referee: Pansa Chaisanit (Thailand) |

| 24 July 2022 EAFF Championship | China | 1–1 | South Korea | Ibaraki, Japan |
| 16:00 UTC+9 | Wang Linlin 73' | Report (EAFF); Report (EAFF) | Choe Yu-ri 34' | Stadium: Kashima Soccer Stadium; Attendance: 352; Referee: Kate Jacewicz (Australia) |

| 26 July 2022 EAFF Championship | South Korea | 4–0 | Chinese Taipei | Ibaraki, Japan |
| 15:00 UTC+9 | Chang Chi-lan 35' (o.g.); Kang Chae-rim 38'; Lee Min-a 40'; Ko Min-jung 90+1' | Report (EAFF); Report (EAFF) | | Stadium: Kashima Soccer Stadium; Attendance: 347; Referee: Aye Thein Thein (Myanmar) |

| 3 September Friendly | South Korea | 1–0 | Jamaica | Hwaseong, South Korea |
| 17:00 UTC+9 | Choe Yu-ri 23' | Report | | Stadium: Hwaseong Stadium; Attendance: 1,500; Referee: Haruna Kanematsu (Japan) |

| 12 November Friendly | New Zealand | 0–1 | South Korea | Christchurch, New Zealand |
| 14:30 UTC+13 | | Report | Lee Min-a 31' | Stadium: Orangetheory Stadium; Attendance: 0 Referee: Casey Reibelt (Australia) |

| 15 November Friendly | New Zealand | 1–1 | South Korea | Christchurch, New Zealand |
| 18:00 UTC+13 | Chance 13' | Report | Park Ye-eun 57' | Stadium: Orangetheory Stadium; Attendance: 0 Referee: Kate Jacewicz (Australia) |

=== 2023 ===
| 16 February 2023 Arnold Clark Cup | England | 4–0 | South Korea | Milton Keynes, England |
| 19:45 UTC+0 | Stanway 40' (pen.); Kelly 46'; Russo 50'; James 78' | Report | | Stadium: Stadium MK; Attendance: 21,013; Referee: Andreza de Siqueira (Brazil) |

| 19 February 2023 Arnold Clark Cup | Belgium | 2–1 | South Korea | Coventry, England |
| 18:15 UTC+0 | Wullaert 45+1'; De Caigny 68' | Report | Lee Geum-min 10' | Stadium: Coventry Building Society Arena; Referee: Frida Nielsen (Denmark) |

| 22 February 2023 Arnold Clark Cup | South Korea | 1–2 | Italy | Bristol, England |
| | | Report | | Stadium: Ashton Gate Stadium |

| 7 April Friendly | South Korea | 5–2 | Zambia | Suwon, South Korea |
| 19:00 UTC+9 | Cho So-hyun 24', 84'; Lee Geum-min 58', 62'; Park Eun-sun 90+1' | Report | Kundananji 38'; Banda 45+2' | Stadium: Suwon World Cup Stadium; Referee: Anna-Marie Keighley (New Zealand) |

| 11 April Friendly | South Korea | 5–0 | Zambia | Yongin, South Korea |
| | Lee Geum-min 33' (pen.), 53', 77' (pen.); Park Eun-sun 35', 89' | Report | | Stadium: Yongin Mireu Stadium; Referee: Anna-Marie Keighley (New Zealand) |

| 8 July Friendly | South Korea | 2–1 | Haiti | Seoul, South Korea |
| 17:00 UTC+9 | | | | Stadium: Seoul World Cup Stadium |

| 25 July 2023 FIFA Women's World Cup (Group H) | Colombia | 2–0 | South Korea | Sydney, Australia |
| 12:00 UTC+10 | Usme 30' (pen.); Caicedo 39' | Report (FIFA) | | Stadium: Sydney Football Stadium; Attendance: 24,323; Referee: Rebecca Welch (England) |

| 30 July 2023 FIFA Women's World Cup (Group H) | South Korea | 0–1 | Morocco | Adelaide, Australia |
| 14:00 UTC+9:30 | | Report (FIFA) | Jraïdi 6' | Stadium: Hindmarsh Stadium; Attendance: 12,886; Referee: Edina Alves Batista (Brazil) |

| 3 August 2023 FIFA Women's World Cup (Group H) | South Korea | 1–1 | Germany | Brisbane, Australia |
| 20:00 UTC+10 | Cho So-hyun 6' | Report (FIFA) | Popp 42' | Stadium: Lang Park; Attendance: 38,945; Referee: Anna-Marie Keighley (New Zealand) |

| 22 September 2022 Asian Games (Group E) | South Korea | 3–0 | Myanmar | Wenzhou, China |
| 19:30 UTC+8 | Lee Eun-young 24'; Ji So-yun 60'; Jeon Eun-ha 68' | Report | | Stadium: Wenzhou Sports Center Stadium; Attendance: 3,234; Referee: Doumouh Al Bakkar (Lebanon) |

| 25 September 2022 Asian Games (Group E) | Philippines | 1–5 | South Korea | Wenzhou, China |
| 19:30 UTC+8 | Bolden 8' | Report | Chun Ga-ram 12'; Son Hwa-yeon 44', 56', 70'; Ji So-yun 52' (pen.) | Stadium: Wenzhou Sports Center Stadium; Attendance: 2,974; Referee: Asaka Koizumi (Japan) |

| 28 September 2022 Asian Games (Group E) | South Korea | 5–0 | Hong Kong | Wenzhou, China |
| 19:30 UTC+8 | Moon Mi-ra 29', 45+1'; Mun Eun-ju 47', 70'; Wu Choi Yiu 52' (o.g.) | Report | | Stadium: Wenzhou Olympic Sports Center Stadium; Attendance: 22,083; Referee: Lê Thị Lý (Vietnam) |

| 30 September 2022 Asian Games (Quarter-finals) | South Korea | 1–4 | North Korea | Wenzhou, China |
| 16:30 UTC+8 | An Myong-song 11' (o.g.) | Report | Ri Hak 20', 90'; An Myong-song 81'; Kim Kyong-yong 90+5' | Stadium: Wenzhou Sports Centre; Attendance: 6,171; Referee: Pansa Chaisanit (Thailand) |

| 26 October 2024 Summer Olympics (Qualification) | South Korea | 10–1 | Thailand | Xiamen, China |
| 15:30 UTC+8 | Phair 33', 56', 66'; Chun Ga-ram 36', 49', 75'; Kang Chae-rim 39', 54'; Lee Geum-min 68'; Moon Mi-ra 72' | Report | Moondong 90+3' | Stadium: Xiamen Egret Stadium; Attendance: 2,269; Referee: Lê Thị Lý (Vietnam) |

| 29 October 2024 Summer Olympics (Qualification) | North Korea | 0–0 | South Korea | Xiamen, China |
| 15:30 UTC+8 | | Report | | Stadium: Xiamen Egret Stadium; Attendance: 7,582; Referee: Lê Thị Lý (Vietnam) |

| 1 November 2024 Summer Olympics (Qualification) | China | 1–1 | South Korea | Xiamen, China |
| 19:30 UTC+8 | Wang Shanshan 78' | Report | Shim Seo-yeon 62' | Stadium: Xiamen Egret Stadium; Attendance: 21,958; Referee: Kate Jacewicz (Australia) |

=== 2024 ===
| 24 February Friendly | Czech Republic | 1–2 | South Korea | Lisbon, Portugal |
| 18:00 UTC+0 | Bartoňová 53' | Report | Ji So-yun 16'; Phair 46' | Referee: Sandra Braz Bastos (Portugal) |

| 27 February Friendly | Portugal | 5–1 | South Korea | Estoril, Portugal |
| --:-- UTC+0 | Joana Marchão 18'; Andreia 37'; Encarnação 45'; Jessica Silva 45+2', 52' | | Son Hwa-yeon 79' | Stadium: Estádio António Coimbra da Mota; Referee: Daniela Constantinescu (Romania) |

| 5 April Friendly | Philippines | 0–3 | South Korea | Icheon, South Korea |
| | | Report | Choe Yu-ri 73'; Ji So-yun 76'; Jang Sel-gi 88' | Stadium: Icheon Sports Complex |

| 8 April Friendly | Philippines | 1–2 | South Korea | Icheon, South Korea |
| 19:00 UTC+9 | Beard 74' | Report | Choo Hyo-joo 1'; Choe Yu-ri 33' | Stadium: Icheon Sports Complex |

| 1 June Friendly | United States | 4–0 | South Korea | Commerce City, United States |
| 15:00 UTC−6 | Swanson 34', 74'; Davidson 38', 48' | Report | | Stadium: Dick's Sporting Goods Park; Attendance: 19,010; Referee: Carly Shaw-MacLaren (Canada) |

| 4 June Friendly | United States | 3–0 | South Korea | St. Paul, United States |
| 19:00 UTC−5 | Dunn 13'; Smith 67'; Yohannes 82' | Report | | Stadium: Allianz Field; Attendance: 19,169; Referee: Astrid Azucena Gramajo (Guatemala) |

| 26 October Friendly | Japan | 4–0 | South Korea | Tokyo, Japan |
| 14:20 UTC+9 | Kitagawa 33'; Fujino 34'; Tanaka 37'; Tanikawa 56' | Report | | Stadium: Japan National Stadium; Attendance: 12,420; Referee: Shu Ting Yang (Chinese Taipei) |

| 29 November Friendly | Spain | 5–0 | South Korea | Cartagena, Spain |
| 19:00 UTC+1 | Pina 4'; Sarriegi 33'; Bonmatí 45+1'; López 63', 90+3' | Report | | Stadium: Estadio Cartagonova; Attendance: 8,660; Referee: Kirsty Dowle (England) |

| 3 December Friendly | Canada | 5–1 | South Korea | Murcia, Spain |
| 18:00 UTC+1 | Lim Seon-joo 22' (o.g.); Alidou 52'; Smith 58'; Gilles 78'; Leon 90+2' | Report | Lee Hyo-kyeong 76' | Stadium: Pinatar Arena |

=== 2025 ===
| 20 February Pink Ladies Cup | South Korea | 3–0 | Uzbekistan | Al Hamriyah, UAE |
| 11:00 GST (UTC+4) | Choo Hyo-joo 42', 45+3'; Choe Yu-ri 90+2' | Report | | Stadium: Hamriyah CSC Stadium |

| 23 February Pink Ladies Cup | Thailand | 0–4 | South Korea | Al Hamriyah, UAE |
| 15:00 GST (UTC+4) | | Report | Lee Geum-min 24'; Choe Yu-ri 32'; Ji So-yun 45+2'; Moon Eun-ju 77' | Stadium: Hamriyah CSC Stadium |

| 26 February Pink Ladies Cup | India | 0–3 | South Korea | Al Hamriyah, UAE |
| 11:00 GST (UTC+4) | | Report | Choi Yoo-jeong 8'; Choi Da-gyeong 27'; Moon Eun-ju 81' | Stadium: Hamriyah CSC Stadium |

| 4 April Friendly | Australia | 1–0 | South Korea | Sydney, Australia |
| 20:00 UTC+11 | Lim Seon-joo 54' (o.g.) | Report | | Stadium: Allianz Stadium; Attendance: 37,199; Referee: Yoshimi Yamashita (Japan) |

| 7 April Friendly | Australia | 2–0 | South Korea | Newcastle, Australia |
| 19:30 UTC+10 | Fowler 43'; Lim Seon-joo 63' (o.g.) | Report | | Stadium: McDonald Jones Stadium; Attendance: 28,019; Referee: Asaka Koizumi (Japan) |

| 30 May Friendly | South Korea | 0–1 | Colombia | Incheon, South Korea |
| 19:00 UTC+9 | | Report | Usme 26' | Stadium: Incheon Namdong Asiad Rugby Field; Attendance: 912; Referee: Koizumi Asaka (Japan) |

| 2 June Friendly | South Korea | 1–1 | Colombia | Yongin, South Korea |
| 19:00 UTC+9 | Jung Min-young 2' | Report | Kim Jin-hui 63' (o.g.) | Stadium: Yongin Mireu Stadium; Attendance: 742; Referee: Yoshimi Yamashita (Japan) |

| 9 July EAFF Championship | South Korea | 2–2 | China | Suwon, South Korea |
| 20:00 UTC+9 | Jang Sel-gi 45+1'; Ji So-yun 90+4' | report | Yao Wei 15'; Shao Ziqin 67' | Stadium: Suwon World Cup Stadium; Attendance: 923; Referee: Bùi Thị Thu Trang (Vietnam) |

| 13 July EAFF Championship | Japan | 1–1 | South Korea | Hwaseong, South Korea |
| 20:00 UTC+9 | Narumiya 37' | report | Jeong Da-bin 86' | Stadium: Hwaseong Sports Complex; Attendance: 1,641; Referee: Tam Ping Wun (Hong Kong) |

| 16 July EAFF Championship | South Korea | 2–0 | Chinese Taipei | Suwon, South Korea |
| 19:30 UTC+9 | Ji So-yun 70' (pen.); Jang Sel-gi 85' | report | | Stadium: Suwon World Cup Stadium; Attendance: 597; Referee: Khin Nyein Chan (Myanmar) |

| 28 November Friendly | Wales | 1–1 | South Korea | Málaga, Spain |
| 19:00 | Ingle 4' | Report | Kim Min-ji 67' | Referee: Caroline Lanssens (Belgium) |

| 2 December Friendly | Netherlands | 5–0 | South Korea | Waalwijk, Netherlands |
| 20:45 | Miedema 9', 17', 31', 38'; Peddemors 43' | Report |

=== 2026 ===
| 2 March AFC Women's Asian Cup GS | South Korea | 3–0 | Iran | Gold Coast, Australia |
| 18:00 | Choe Yu-ri 37'; Kim Hye-ri 59' (pen.); Ko Yoo-jin 75' | Report (AFC); Report (FIFA) | | Stadium: Gold Coast Stadium; Referee: Veronika Bernatskaia (Kyrgyzstan) |

| 5 March AFC Women's Asian Cup GS | Philippines | 0–3 | South Korea | Gold Coast, Australia |
| 13:00 UTC+10 | | Report (AFC); Report (FIFA) | Jeon Yu-gyeong 12'; Park Soo-jeong 15'; Mun Eun-ju 56' | Stadium: Gold Coast Stadium; Attendance: 2,332; Referee: Lê Thị Ly (Vietnam) |

| 8 March AFC Women's Asian Cup GS | Australia | 3–3 | South Korea | Sydney, Australia |
| 20:00 UTC+11 | Kennedy 33', 90+8'; Kerr 45+6' | Report (AFC); Report (FIFA) | Mun Eun-ju 13'; Kim Shin-ji 53' (pen.); Kang Chae-rim 56' | Stadium: Stadium Australia; Referee: Yoshimi Yamashita (Japan) |

| 14 March AFC Women's Asian Cup QF | South Korea | 6–0 | Uzbekistan | Sydney, Australia |
| 20:00 UTC+11 | Son Hwa-yeon 9'; Ko Yoo-jin 20'; Park Soo-jeong 57'; Ji So-yun 72'; Lee Eun-young 85'; Jang Sel-gi 90+3' (pen.) | Report (AFC); Report (FIFA) | | Stadium: Stadium Australia; Attendance: 12,974; Referee: Lara Lee (Australia) |

| 18 March AFC Women's Asian Cup SF | South Korea | 1–4 | Japan | Sydney, Australia |
| 20:00 UTC+11 | Kang Chae-rim 78' | Report (AFC); Report (FIFA) | Ueki 15'; Hamano 25'; Kumagai 75'; Chiba 81' | Stadium: Stadium Australia; Attendance: 17,367; Referee: Veronika Bernatskaia (Kyrgyzstan) |

| 11 April 2026 FIFA Series | Brazil | 5–1 | South Korea | Cuiabá, Brazil |
| 21:30 UTC−4 | Ary Borges 42'; Ludmila 47'; Dudinha 58'; Kerolin 61'; T. Maranhão 83' | Report (FIFA) | Park Soo-jeong 87' | Stadium: Arena Pantanal; Referee: Laura Fortunato (Argentina) |

| 14 April 2026 FIFA Series | Canada | 3–1 | South Korea | Cuiabá, Brazil |
| 15:30 UTC−4 | Viens 23'; Gilles 50', 70' | Report (FIFA) | Kim Shin-ji 29' | Stadium: Arena Pantanal; Referee: Charly Deretti (Brazil) |

| 18 April 2026 FIFA Series | South Korea | 1–1 | Zambia | Cuiabá, Brazil |
| 15:30 UTC−4 | C. Phair 45+3' | Report (FIFA) | B. Banda 26' (pen.) | Stadium: Arena Pantanal; Referee: Edina Batista (Brazil) |

| 3 June EAFF E-1 Football Championship Preliminary round GS | Guam | 0–5 | South Korea | Dededo, Guam |
| 18:00 UTC+10 | | Report (EAFF) | Jang You-been 4', 28'; Son Hwa-yeon 6', 43'; Ko Yoo-jin 57' | Stadium: GFA National Training Center; Referee: Yoshimi Yamashita (Japan) |

| 5 June EAFF E-1 Football Championship Preliminary round GS | Macau | 0–13 (Note: The Korea Football Association explained, 'We were notified by the EAFF via official letter on the night of the 30th of last month that the match against Macau among the three qualifying matches played by South Korea will not be recognized as an official A match.' According to FIFA regulations, the principle is that a national team may play a maximum of two matches during the A match window. However, as the EAFF's request for FIFA approval was delayed, the current EAFF qualifying schedule does not meet the minimum 48-hour rest period required before matches to protect players. In the past, FIFA approved EAFF qualifying matches held in the same or similar manner without raising issues, but as FIFA has recently applied related regulations more strictly, this measure was taken.) | South Korea | Dededo, Guam |
| 14:30 UTC+10 | | Report (EAFF) | Kim Ji-yun 3'; Jang You-been 4', 53'; Kim Ji-hyeon 11', 22', 46'; Weng Lam Chong 49' (o.g.); Lee Min-hwa 57', 76'; Park Ye-na 79'; Son Hwa-yeon 81'; Jang Sel-gi 86', 90' | Stadium: GFA National Training Center; Referee: Sugino Azusa (Japan) |

| 9 June EAFF E-1 Football Championship Preliminary round Final | South Korea | 5–3 (a.e.t.) | Chinese Taipei | Dededo, Guam |
| 18:00 UTC+10 | Yun Su-jeong 50', 105'; Kim Hye-ri 53' (pen.); Jang Sel-gi 114'; Jeong Yu-jin 120' | Report (EAFF) | Hsu Yi-yun 54'; Chen Jin-wen 61'; Li Yi-wen 106' | Stadium: GFA National Training Center; Referee: Koizumi Asaka (Japan) |

| 14 September 2026 Asian Games GS | South Korea | 5–0 | Myanmar | Osaka, Japan |
| 19:30 UTC+9 | Kim Min-ji 29', 33', 59'; Jang Sel-gi 38'; Choe Yu-ri 76' | Report | | Stadium: Nagai Stadium; Attendance: 500; Referee: Tian Jin (China) |

| 17 September 2026 Asian Games GS | Bangladesh | 0–6 | South Korea | Osaka, Japan |
| 16:00 UTC+9 | | Report | Kim Min-ji 16'; Jeong Da-bin 42'; Choe Yu-ri 65'; Ji So-yun 77'; Hyun Seul-gi 79'; Ko Yoo-jin 90+1' | Stadium: Nagai Stadium; Attendance: 135; Referee: Fatemeh Nasiri Looshani (Iran) |

| 21 September 2026 Asian Games GS | South Korea | 1–1 | North Korea | Fukuroi, Japan |
| 16:00 UTC+9 | Yoon Su-jeong 46' | Report | Chae Un-yong 35' | Stadium: Shizuoka Stadium; Attendance: 2,032; Referee: Supiree Testhomya (Thailand) |

| 25 September 2026 Asian Games QF | South Korea | 6–3 | Uzbekistan | Osaka, Japan |
| 19:30 UTC+9 | Yoon Su-jeong 6', 44'; Choe Yu-ri 17', 45+1'; Khabibullaeva 74' (o.g.); Kim Min-ji 90+4' | Report | Khabibullaeva 10'; Jang Sel-gi 64' (o.g.); Kudratova 66' | Stadium: Nagai Stadium; Attendance: 240; Referee: Mu Mingxin (China) |

| 29 September 2026 Asian Games SF | Japan | 2–0 | South Korea | Fukuroi, Japan |
| 19:30 UTC+9 | Kamiya 54', 63' | Report | | Stadium: Shizuoka Stadium; Attendance: 998; Referee: Lê Thị Ly (Vietnam) |

| 2 October 2026 Asian Games 3rd | China | 0–1 | South Korea | Fukuroi, Japan |
| 19:30 UTC+9 | | Report | Noh Jin-young 4' | Stadium: Shizuoka Stadium; Attendance: 1,331; Referee: Rawdha Al-Mansoori (United Arab Emirates) |

== See also ==
- South Korea national football team results
