= 2026 AFC Women's Asian Cup knockout stage =

Football tournament

The 2026 AFC Women's Asian Cup knockout stage was the second and final stage of the 2026 AFC Women's Asian Cup final tournament. It began on 13 March with the quarter-finals and ended on 21 March 2026 with the final.

All times are local.

== Format ==
In the knockout stage, extra time and a penalty shoot-out were used to decide the winner if necessary (Regulations Article 10.1).

=== Combinations of matches in the quarter-finals ===
The specific matchups involving the third-placed teams depended on which two third-placed teams qualified for the quarter-finals.

Combinations of matches in the quarter-finals
No.	Third-placed teams advance from groups			1A vs	1C vs
1	A	B		3B	3A
2	A		C	3C	3A
3		B	C	3C	3B

== Qualified teams ==
The top two placed teams from each of the three groups, along with the two best-ranked third-placed teams, qualified for the knockout stage.

Group	Winners	Runners-up	Third-placed teams (Best two qualify)
A	South Korea	Australia	Philippines
B	China	North Korea	Uzbekistan
C	Japan	Chinese Taipei	—N/a

== Bracket ==
Quarter-finals
14 March – Sydney (SA)
South Korea	6
Uzbekistan	0
15 March – Sydney (SA)
Japan	7
Philippines	0
14 March – Perth (PRS)
China (a.e.t.)	2
Chinese Taipei	0
13 March – Perth (PRS)
Australia	2
North Korea	1

Semi-finals
18 March – Sydney (SA)
South Korea	1
Japan	4
17 March – Perth (PS)
China	1
Australia	2

Final
21 March – Sydney (SA)
Japan	1
Australia	0

Play-in matches 19 March – Gold Coast
Uzbekistan	0
Philippines	2
19 March – Gold Coast
Chinese Taipei	0
North Korea	4

== Quarter-finals ==
The winners qualified for the 2027 FIFA Women's World Cup. The losers advanced to the play-in matches.

=== Australia vs North Korea ===
13 March 2026
18:00 UTC+8

Australia	2–1	North Korea
Kennedy 9'; Kerr 47'	Report (AFC); Report (FIFA)	Chae Un-yong 65'

Perth Rectangular Stadium, Perth
Attendance: 16,466
Referee: Veronika Bernatskaia (Kyrgyzstan)

GK	1	Mackenzie Arnold
DF	21	Ellie Carpenter
DF	4	Clare Hunt
DF	3	Wini Heatley
DF	8	Kaitlyn Torpey	(yellow card) 77'
MF	10	Emily van Egmond		(substituted off) 70'
MF	14	Alanna Kennedy		(substituted off) 90'
MF	19	Katrina Gorry		(substituted off) 90'
FW	11	Mary Fowler		(substituted off) 70'
FW	20	Sam Kerr (c)		(substituted off) 90+4'
FW	9	Caitlin Foord
Substitutions:
MF	6	Clare Wheeler		(substituted on) 70'
MF	17	Amy Sayer		(substituted on) 70'
MF	23	Kyra Cooney-Cross		(substituted on) 90'
DF	24	Charlize Rule		(substituted on) 90'
FW	22	Michelle Heyman		(substituted on) 90+4'
Manager:
Joe Montemurro

GK	18	Yu Son-gum
DF	2	Ri Myong-gum
DF	5	An Kuk-hyang (c)
DF	23	Ri Hye-gyong
DF	16	Song Chun-sim
MF	20	Chae Un-yong
MF	9	Kim Song-gyong		(substituted off) 51'
MF	7	Myong Yu-jong	(yellow card) 84'
MF	12	Hong Song-ok
FW	11	Han Jin-hong		(substituted off) 51'
FW	17	Kim Kyong-yong
Substitutions:
FW	8	Choe Il-son		(substituted on) 51'
FW	10	Ri Hak		(substituted on) 51'
Manager:
Ri Song-ho

Player of the Match:
(Australia) Mackenzie Arnold

Assistant referees:
Heba Saadieh (Palestine)
Supawan Hinthong (Thailand)
Fourth official:
Doumouh Al Bakkar (Lebanon)
Reserve assistant referee:
Makoto Bozono (Japan)
Video assistant referee:
Muhammad Taqi (Singapore)
Assistant video assistant referee:
Meshari Al-Shamari (Qatar)

Statistics	Australia	North Korea
Possession	38.3%	61.7%
Shots	4	25
Shots on target	2	10
Passes	358	540
Fouls committed	9	6
Corner kicks	1	10

=== China vs Chinese Taipei ===
14 March 2026
13:00 UTC+8

China	2–0 (a.e.t.)	Chinese Taipei
Shao Ziqin 94'; Chen Ying-hui 118' (o.g.)	Report (AFC); Report (FIFA)

Perth Rectangular Stadium, Perth
Attendance: 5,238
Referee: Oh Hyeon-jeong (South Korea)

GK	12	Peng Shimeng	(yellow card) 116'
DF	3	Chen Qiaozhu
DF	4	Wang Linlin
DF	5	Wu Haiyan (c)
DF	6	Zhang Xin
DF	21	Li Mengwen		(substituted off) 46'
MF	7	Wang Shuang	(yellow card) 75'	(substituted off) 98'
MF	10	Wang Yanwen		(substituted off) 63'
MF	14	Li Qingtong		(substituted off) 63'
FW	11	Wu Chengshu		(substituted off) 46'
FW	23	Shao Ziqin		(substituted off) 90+4'
Substitutions:
FW	9	Wurigumula		(substituted on) 46'
FW	20	Zhang Chengxue		(substituted on) 46'
MF	8	Yao Wei		(substituted on) 63'
MF	26	Zhang Rui		(substituted on) 63'
MF	19	Zhang Linyan		(substituted on) 74'
FW	13	Jin Kun		(substituted on) 98'
Manager:
(Australia) Ante Milicic

GK	23	Cheng Ssu-yu
DF	2	Chang Chi-lan	(substituted off) 83'
DF	3	Su Sin-yun	(substituted off) 109'
DF	20	Chen Ying-hui (c)
DF	22	Huang Ke-sin
MF	9	Hsu Yi-yun
MF	10	Saki Matsunaga
MF	14	Wu Kai-Ching	(substituted off) 109'
MF	17	Chen Jin-wen	(substituted off) 109'
MF	21	Chen Yu-chin	(substituted off) 28'
FW	19	Su Yu-hsuan	(substituted off) 99'
Substitutions:
DF	8	Li Yi-wen	(substituted on) 78'
DF	6	Teng Pei-lin	(substituted on) 83'
FW	16	Liu Yu-chiao	(substituted on) 99'
FW	7	Ting Chi	(substituted on) 109'
FW	11	He Jia-shiuan	(substituted on) 109'
DF	24	Pan Yen-hsin	(substituted on) 109'
Manager:
(Thailand) Prasobchoke Chokemor

Player of the Match:
(China) Shao Ziqin

Assistant referees:
Park Mi-suk (South Korea)
Lee Soo-bin (South Korea)
Fourth official:
Asaka Koizumi (Japan)
Reserve assistant referee:
Chihiro Ikki (Japan)
Video assistant referee:
Sivakorn Pu-udom (Thailand)
Assistant video assistant referee:
Mamdouh Al-Shadan (Saudi Arabia)

Statistics	China	Chinese Taipei
Possession	72.1%	27.9%
Shots	26	2
Shots on target	8	0
Passes	779	314
Fouls committed	9	4
Corner kicks	9	1

=== South Korea vs Uzbekistan ===
14 March 2026
20:00 UTC+11

South Korea	6–0	Uzbekistan
Son Hwa-yeon 9'; Ko Yoo-jin 20'; Park Soo-jeong 57'; Ji So-yun 72'; Lee Eun-young 85'; Jang Sel-gi 90+3' (pen.)	Report (AFC); Report (FIFA)

Stadium Australia, Sydney
Attendance: 12,974
Referee: Lara Lee (Australia)

GK	18	Ryu Ji-soo	(substituted off) 83'
DF	5	Ko Yoo-jin (c)
DF	16	Jang Sel-gi
DF	19	Noh Jin-young
DF	20	Kim Hye-ri	(substituted off) 46'
MF	8	Kim Shin-ji	(substituted off) 46'
MF	9	Mun Eun-ju	(substituted off) 76'
MF	10	Ji So-yun
MF	11	Choe Yu-ri	(substituted off) 64'
MF	13	Park Soo-jeong
FW	7	Son Hwa-yeon
Substitutions:
MF	14	Jung Min-young	(substituted on) 46'
DF	22	Choo Hyo-joo	(substituted on) 46'
MF	23	Kang Chae-rim	(substituted on) 64'
MF	24	Lee Eun-young	(substituted on) 76'
GK	1	Woo Seo-bin	(substituted on) 83'
Manager:
Shin Sang-woo

GK	1	Maftuna Jonimqulova
DF	6	Dilrabo Asadova
DF	20	Kamila Zaripova		(substituted off) 78'
DF	21	Leyla Oraniyazova	(yellow card) 79'
DF	22	Sevinch Kuchkorova		(substituted off) 89'
MF	3	Kholida Dadaboeva (c)
MF	5	Solikha Khusniddinova		(substituted off) 46'
MF	15	Umida Zoirova		(substituted off) 63'
MF	16	Zarina Mamatkarimova
MF	26	Diyora Bakhtiyarova
FW	18	Dildora Novimova		(substituted off) 63'
Substitutions:
FW	10	Diyorakhon Khabibullaeva		(substituted on) 46'
MF	24	Ominakhon Valikhanova		(substituted on) 63'
MF	25	Rukhshona Usarova		(substituted on) 63'
DF	4	Shodiya Tosheva		(substituted on) 78'
MF	23	Asalkhona Aminjonova		(substituted on) 89'
Manager:
(Lithuania) Kotryna Kulbytė

Player of the Match:
(South Korea) Ko Yoo-jin

Assistant referees:
Emma Kocbek (Australia)
Madelaine Allum (Australia)
Fourth official:
Casey Reibelt (Australia)
Reserve assistant referee:
Hà Thị Phượng (Vietnam)
Video assistant referee:
Kate Jacewicz (Australia)
Assistant video assistant referee:
Muhammad Taqi (Singapore)

Statistics	South Korea	Uzbekistan
Possession	80.5%	19.5%
Shots	26	1
Shots on target	16	0
Passes	642	159
Fouls committed	6	10
Corner kicks	11	0

=== Japan vs Philippines ===
15 March 2026
16:00 UTC+11

Japan	7–0	Philippines
Tanaka 45'; Koga 45+3', 76'; Chiba 65'; Matsukubo 67'; Tanikawa 86'; Ueki 90'	Report (AFC); Report (FIFA)

Stadium Australia, Sydney
Attendance: 13,321
Referee: Dong Fangyu (China)

GK	12	Chika Hirao	(substituted off) 73'
DF	2	Risa Shimizu
DF	3	Moeka Minami
DF	6	Tōko Koga
DF	21	Miyabi Moriya	(substituted off) 46'
MF	7	Hinata Miyazawa	(substituted off) 57'
MF	14	Yui Hasegawa (c)	(substituted off) 57'
MF	15	Aoba Fujino
MF	18	Honoka Hayashi
FW	8	Kiko Seike	(substituted off) 46'
FW	11	Mina Tanaka	(substituted off) 89'
Substitutions:
DF	13	Hikaru Kitagawa	(substituted on) 46'
FW	25	Remina Chiba	(substituted on) 46'
MF	19	Momoko Tanikawa	(substituted on) 57'
MF	20	Manaka Matsukubo	(substituted on) 57'
GK	23	Akane Okuma	(substituted on) 73'
FW	9	Riko Ueki	(substituted on) 89'
Manager:
(Denmark) Nils Nielsen

GK	18	Nina Meollo
DF	3	Jessika Cowart	(substituted off) 59'
DF	5	Hali Long (c)	(substituted off) 71'
DF	12	Kaya Hawkinson
DF	14	Jourdyn Curran
DF	17	Ariana Markey
MF	2	Malea Cesar	(substituted off) 87'
MF	6	Jaclyn Sawicki	(substituted off) 59'
MF	15	Isabella Pasion
MF	23	Alexa Pino
FW	24	Mallie Ramirez	(substituted off) 9'
Substitutions:
FW	10	Chandler McDaniel	(substituted on) 9' (substituted off) 59'
MF	8	Sara Eggesvik	(substituted on) 59'
DF	13	Angela Beard	(substituted on) 59'
FW	19	Alessandrea Carpio	(substituted on) 59'
DF	16	Sofia Wunsch	(substituted on) 71'
MF	11	Anicka Castañeda	(substituted on) 87'
Manager:
(Australia) Mark Torcaso

Player of the Match:
(Japan) Risa Shimizu

Assistant referees:
Xie Lijun (China)
Bao Mengxiao (China)
Fourth official:
Supiree Testhomya (Thailand)
Reserve assistant referee:
Nuannid Donjangreed (Thailand)
Video assistant referee:
Fu Ming (China)
Assistant video assistant referee:
Law Bik Chi (Hong Kong)

Statistics	Japan	Philippines
Possession	85.3%	14.7%
Shots	50	0
Shots on target	17	0
Passes	622	117
Fouls committed	3	2
Corner kicks	17	0

== Play-in matches ==
The winners qualified for the 2027 FIFA Women's World Cup. The losers advanced to the inter-confederation play-offs.

=== Uzbekistan vs Philippines ===
19 March 2026
13:00 UTC+10

Uzbekistan	0–2	Philippines
	Report (AFC); Report (FIFA)	Beard 47'; Sawicki 52'

Gold Coast Stadium, Gold Coast
Attendance: 1,922
Referee: Casey Reibelt (Australia)

GK	1	Maftuna Jonimqulova
DF	2	Madina Khikmatova
DF	6	Dilrabo Asadova	(yellow card) 56'
DF	11	Maftuna Shoyimova
DF	21	Leyla Oraniyazova
MF	14	Gulzoda Amirova		(substituted off) 35'
MF	16	Zarina Mamatkarimova
MF	17	Lyudmila Karachik
FW	7	Nilufar Kudratova
FW	10	Diyorakhon Khabibullaeva	(yellow card) 58'
MF	15	Umida Zoirova		(substituted off) 63'
Substitutions:
MF	8	Ilvina Ablyakimova		(substituted on) 35' (substituted off) 76'
FW	18	Dildora Novimova		(substituted on) 63'
DF	22	Sevench Kuchkorova		(substituted on) 76'
Manager:
(Lithuania) Kotryna Kulbytė

GK	1	Olivia McDaniel
DF	3	Jessika Cowart
DF	5	Hali Long
DF	9	Carleigh Frilles		(substituted off) 90'
DF	16	Sofia Wunsch
MF	6	Jaclyn Sawicki
MF	7	Jael-Marie Guy		(substituted off) 67'
MF	13	Angela Beard	(yellow card) 90+2'
MF	21	Katrina Guillou
FW	8	Sara Eggesvik		(substituted off) 74'
FW	10	Chandler McDaniel		(substituted off) 67'
Substitutions:
DF	17	Ariana Markey		(substituted on) 67'
MF	23	Alexa Pino		(substituted on) 67'
DF	14	Jourdyn Curran		(substituted on) 74'
MF	4	Natalie Oca		(substituted on) 90'
Manager:
(Australia) Mark Torcaso

Player of the Match:
(Philippines) Jael-Marie Guy

Assistant referees:
Emma Kocbek (Australia)
Madelaine Allum (Australia)
Fourth official:
Oh Hyeon-jeong (South Korea)
Reserve assistant referee:
Lee Soo-bin (South Korea)
Video assistant referee:
Kate Jacewicz (Australia)
Assistant video assistant referee:
Mamdouh Al-Shadan (Saudi Arabia)

Statistics	Uzbekistan	Philippines
Possession	53.3%	46.7%
Shots	6	17
Shots on target	2	6
Passes	421	353
Fouls committed	10	5
Corner kicks	2	3

=== Chinese Taipei vs North Korea ===
19 March 2026
19:00 UTC+10

Chinese Taipei	0–4	North Korea
	Report (AFC); Report (FIFA)	Hong Song-ok 32', 49', 68'; Kim Kyong-yong 52'

Gold Coast Stadium, Gold Coast
Attendance: 3,560
Referee: Asaka Koizumi (Japan)

GK	23	Cheng Ssu-yu
DF	2	Chang Chi-lan		(substituted off) 79'
DF	3	Su Sin-yun
DF	20	Chen Ying-hui (c)
DF	22	Huang Ke-sin
MF	9	Hsu Yi-yun		(substituted off) 90+6'
MF	10	Saki Matsunaga
MF	14	Wu Kai-Ching
MF	17	Chen Jin-wen		(substituted off) 88'
MF	21	Chen Yu-chin	(yellow card) 90+4'	(substituted off) 90+6'
FW	19	Su Yu-hsuan		(substituted off) 88'
Substitutions:
MF	13	Chan Pi-han		(substituted on) 79'
FW	16	Liu Yu-chiao		(substituted on) 88'
FW	26	Yang Hsiao-chuan		(substituted on) 88'
FW	11	He Jia-shiuan		(substituted on) 90+6'
FW	25	Wang Hsiang-huei		(substituted on) 90+6'
Manager:
(Thailand) Prasobchoke Chokemor

GK	18	Yu Son-gum
DF	2	Ri Myong-gum	(yellow card) 36'
DF	3	Ri Kum-hyang (c)
DF	14	Hwang Yu-yong		(substituted off) 46'
DF	23	Ri Hye-gyong
MF	9	Kim Song-gyong
MF	10	Ri Hak		(substituted off) 30'
MF	13	Jon Ryong-jong
MF	20	Chae Un-yong
FW	12	Hong Song-ok	(yellow card) 27'
FW	17	Kim Kyong-yong		(substituted off) 63'
Substitutions:
FW	8	Choe Il-son		(substituted on) 30' (substituted off) 77'
DF	16	Song Chun-sim		(substituted on) 46'
FW	24	Ri Song-a		(substituted on) 63'
FW	19	Sin Hyang		(substituted on) 77'
Manager:
Ri Song-ho

Player of the Match:
(North Korea) Hong Song-ok

Assistant referees:
Makoto Bozono (Japan)
Chihiro Ikki (Japan)
Fourth official:
Yoshimi Yamashita (Japan)
Reserve assistant referee:
Nuannid Donjangreed (Thailand)
Video assistant referee:
Jumpei Iida (Japan)
Assistant video assistant referee:
Edita Mirabidova (Uzbekistan)

Statistics	Chinese Taipei	North Korea
Possession	24.0%	76.0%
Shots	4	42
Shots on target	0	17
Passes	242	726
Fouls committed	3	5
Corner kicks	0	11

== Semi-finals ==
=== China vs Australia ===
17 March 2026
18:00 UTC+8

China	1–2	Australia
Zhang Linyan 26' (pen.)	Report (AFC); Report (FIFA)	Foord 17'; Kerr 58'

Perth Stadium, Perth
Attendance: 35,170
Referee: Supiree Testhomya (Thailand)

GK	12	Peng Shimeng
DF	3	Chen Qiaozhu		(substituted off) 87'
DF	5	Wu Haiyan (c)	(yellow card) 87'
DF	8	Yao Wei	(yellow card) 7'
DF	20	Zhang Chengxue		(substituted off) 87'
MF	10	Wang Yanwen		(substituted off) 77'
MF	15	Wang Aifang	(yellow card) 35'
MF	19	Zhang Linyan
MF	26	Zhang Rui		(substituted off) 77'
FW	9	Wurigumula		(substituted off) 71'
FW	23	Shao Ziqin
Substitutions:
FW	13	Jin Kun		(substituted on) 71'
MF	14	Li Qingtong		(substituted on) 77'
MF	16	Liu Jing		(substituted on) 77'
DF	4	Wang Linlin		(substituted on) 87'
FW	24	Yuan Cong		(substituted on) 87'
Manager:
(Australia) Ante Milicic

GK	1	Mackenzie Arnold	(yellow card) 24'
DF	4	Clare Hunt		(substituted off) 59'
DF	7	Steph Catley
DF	8	Kaitlyn Torpey
DF	21	Ellie Carpenter
MF	14	Alanna Kennedy		(substituted off) 90+3'
MF	19	Katrina Gorry		(substituted off) 90+3'
MF	23	Kyra Cooney-Cross		(substituted off) 78'
FW	9	Caitlin Foord
FW	11	Mary Fowler		(substituted off) 78'
FW	20	Sam Kerr (c)
Substitutions:
DF	3	Wini Heatley		(substituted on) 59'
MF	6	Clare Wheeler		(substituted on) 78'
MF	17	Amy Sayer		(substituted on) 78'
MF	10	Emily van Egmond		(substituted on) 90+3'
DF	24	Charlize Rule		(substituted on) 90+3'
Manager:
Joe Montemurro

Player of the Match:
(Australia) Caitlin Foord

Assistant referees:
Supawan Hinthong (Thailand)
Nuannid Donjangreed (Thailand)
Fourth official:
Doumouh Al Bakkar (Lebanon)
Reserve assistant referee:
Park Mi-suk (South Korea)
Video assistant referee:
Sivakorn Pu-udom (Thailand)
Assistant video assistant referee:
Meshari Al-Shamari (Qatar)

Statistics	China	Australia
Possession	44.7%	55.3%
Shots	13	8
Shots on target	4	3
Passes	363	452
Fouls committed	8	5
Corner kicks	2	2

=== South Korea vs Japan ===
18 March 2026
20:00 UTC+11

South Korea	1–4	Japan
Kang Chae-rim 78'	Report (AFC); Report (FIFA)	Ueki 15'; Hamano 25'; Kumagai 75'; Chiba 81'

Stadium Australia, Sydney
Attendance: 17,367
Referee: Veronika Bernatskaia (Kyrgyzstan)

GK	21	Kim Min-jeong
DF	5	Ko Yoo-jin (c)
DF	19	Noh Jin-young
DF	20	Kim Hye-ri
MF	8	Kim Shin-ji	(substituted off) 72'
MF	14	Jung Min-young	(substituted off) 72'
DF	16	Jang Sel-gi
DF	22	Choo Hyo-joo	(substituted off) 46'
FW	9	Mun Eun-ju	(substituted off) 45+4'
FW	13	Park Soo-jeong
FW	15	Jeon Yu-gyeong	(substituted off) 41'
Substitutions:
FW	7	Son Hwa-yeon	(substituted on) 41'
MF	10	Ji So-yun	(substituted on) 45+4'
MF	23	Kang Chae-rim	(substituted on) 46'
MF	3	Park Hye-jeong	(substituted on) 72'
MF	11	Choe Yu-ri	(substituted on) 72'
Manager:
Shin Sang-woo

GK	1	Ayaka Yamashita
DF	4	Saki Kumagai
DF	5	Hana Takahashi
DF	6	Tōko Koga
DF	13	Hikaru Kitagawa	(substituted off) 87'
MF	7	Hinata Miyazawa
MF	10	Fuka Nagano
MF	14	Yui Hasegawa (c)	(substituted off) 79'
FW	9	Riko Ueki	(substituted off) 68'
FW	15	Aoba Fujino	(substituted off) 79'
FW	17	Maika Hamano	(substituted off) 68'
Substitutions:
MF	19	Momoko Tanikawa	(substituted on) 68'
MF	20	Manaka Matsukubo	(substituted on) 68'
DF	16	Yuzuki Yamamoto	(substituted on) 79'
FW	25	Remina Chiba	(substituted on) 79'
DF	2	Risa Shimizu	(substituted on) 87'
Manager:
(Denmark) Nils Nielsen

Player of the Match:
(Japan) Saki Kumagai

Assistant referees:
Heba Saadieh (Palestine)
Hà Thị Phượng (Vietnam)
Fourth official:
Lara Lee (Australia)
Reserve assistant referee:
Xie Lijun (China)
Video assistant referee:
Muhammad Taqi (Singapore)
Assistant video assistant referee:
Mamdouh Al-Shadan (Saudi Arabia)

Statistics	South Korea	Japan
Possession	36.3%	63.7%
Shots	6	21
Shots on target	3	9
Passes	340	590
Fouls committed	8	6
Corner kicks	1	7

== Final ==
21 March 2026
20:00 UTC+11

Japan	1–0	Australia
Hamano 17'	Report (AFC); Report (FIFA)

Stadium Australia, Sydney
Attendance: 74,397
Referee: Kim Yu-jeong (South Korea)

GK	1	Ayaka Yamashita
RB	5	Hana Takahashi
CB	6	Tōko Koga
CB	4	Saki Kumagai
LB	13	Hikaru Kitagawa	(substituted off) 82'
RM	15	Aoba Fujino
CM	7	Hinata Miyazawa
CM	10	Fuka Nagano
LM	17	Maika Hamano	(substituted off) 76'
CAM	14	Yui Hasegawa (c)	(substituted off) 82'
ST	9	Riko Ueki	(substituted off) 57'
Substitutions:
ST	20	Manaka Matsukubo	(substituted on) 57'
LF	25	Remina Chiba	(substituted on) 76'
CB	3	Moeka Minami	(substituted on) 82'
LB	21	Miyabi Moriya	(substituted on) 82'
Manager:
(Denmark) Nils Nielsen

GK	1	Mackenzie Arnold
RB	21	Ellie Carpenter
CB	3	Winonah Heatley
CB	7	Steph Catley
LB	8	Kaitlyn Torpey
CM	23	Kyra Cooney-Cross	(substituted off) 83'
CM	14	Alanna Kennedy
RW	11	Mary Fowler	(substituted off) 83'
CF	19	Katrina Gorry	(substituted off) 64'
LW	9	Caitlin Foord
ST	20	Sam Kerr (c)
Substitutions:
CF	16	Hayley Raso	(substituted on) 64'
CM	6	Clare Wheeler	(substituted on) 83'
RW	10	Emily van Egmond	(substituted on) 83'
Manager:
Joe Montemurro

Player of the Match:
(Japan) Maika Hamano

Assistant referees:
Assistant referees:
Heba Saadieh (Palestine)
Supawan Hinthong (Thailand)
Fourth official:
Oh Hyeon-jeong (South Korea)
Video Assistant Referee (VAR):
Sivakorn Pu-udom (Thailand)
Assistant VAR:
Law Bik Chi (Hong Kong)

Statistics	Japan	Australia
Possession	46%	54%
Shots	9	16
Shots on target	3	5
Passes	361	442
Fouls committed	1	6
Corner kicks	2	4
