= 2026 AFC Women's Asian Cup Group A =

Group A of the 2026 AFC Women's Asian Cup was played from 1 to 8 March 2026, with the group made up of hosts Australia, South Korea, Iran and the Philippines. The top two teams, South Korea and Australia, along with third-placed Philippines (as one of the two best third-placed teams), advanced to the quarter-finals.

== Teams ==
Draw position	Team	Zone	Pot	Method of qualification	Date of qualification	Finals appearance	Last appearance	Previous best performance	FIFA Rankings June 2025 (Note: The June 2025 FIFA Women's World Ranking was used for seeding for the final draw.)	FIFA Rankings December 2025
A1	Australia	AFF	1	Host	15 May 2024	7th	2022	Winners (2010)	15	15
A2	South Korea	EAFF	2	2022 runners-up	18 December 2024	14th	2022	Runners-up (2022)	21	21
A3	Iran	CAFA	4	Group A winner	19 July 2025	2nd	2022	Group stage (2022)	70	68
A4	Philippines	AFF	3	Group G winner	5 July 2025	11th	2022	Semi-finals (2022)	39	41

== Standings ==
Pos	Team	Pld	W	D	L	GF	GA	GD	Pts	Qualification
1	South Korea	3	2	1	0	9	3	+6	7	Advance to knockout stage
2	Australia (H)	3	2	1	0	8	3	+5	7	Advance to knockout stage
3	Philippines	3	1	0	2	2	4	−2	3	Advance to knockout stage
4	Iran	3	0	0	3	0	9	−9	0	

Source: AFC
(H) Hosts

== Matches ==
=== Australia vs Philippines ===
1 March 2026
17:00 UTC+8

Australia	1–0	Philippines
Kerr 14'	Report (AFC); Report (FIFA)

Perth Stadium, Perth
Attendance: 44,379
Referee: Dong Fangyu (China)

GK	12	Chloe Lincoln
RB	21	Ellie Carpenter
CB	3	Wini Heatley
CB	4	Clare Hunt
LB	7	Steph Catley
CM	19	Katrina Gorry
CM	10	Emily van Egmond	(substituted off) 67'
CM	6	Clare Wheeler	(substituted off) 67'
RF	16	Hayley Raso	(substituted off) 81'
CF	20	Sam Kerr (c)
LF	9	Caitlin Foord
Substitutions:
FW	11	Mary Fowler	(substituted on) 67'
DF	14	Alanna Kennedy	(substituted on) 67'
FW	17	Amy Sayer	(substituted on) 81'
Manager:
Joe Montemurro

GK	1	Olivia McDaniel
RB	16	Sofia Wunsch
CB	3	Jessika Cowart
CB	5	Hali Long (c)
LB	13	Angela Beard
CM	9	Carleigh Frilles	(substituted off) 59'
CM	6	Jaclyn Sawicki
CM	8	Sara Eggesvik	(substituted off) 83'
RF	23	Alexa Pino	(substituted off) 46'
CF	10	Chandler McDaniel	(substituted off) 59'
LF	21	Katrina Guillou	(substituted off) 83'
Substitutions:
FW	7	Jael-Marie Guy	(substituted on) 46'
DF	17	Ariana Markey	(substituted on) 59'
FW	24	Mallie Ramirez	(substituted on) 59'
MF	14	Jourdyn Curran	(substituted on) 83'
MF	15	Isabella Pasion	(substituted on) 83'
Manager:
(Australia) Mark Torcaso

Player of the Match:
(Australia) Sam Kerr

Assistant referees:
Xie Lijun (China)
Bao Mengxiao (China)
Fourth official:
Tian Jin (China)
Video assistant referee:
Fu Ming (China)
Assistant video assistant referee:
Law Bik Chi (Hong Kong)

Statistics	Australia	Philippines
Possession	85.4%	14.6%
Shots	15	1
Shots on target	6	0
Passes	679	119
Fouls committed	4	4
Corner kicks	6	0

=== South Korea vs Iran ===
2 March 2026
19:00 UTC+10

South Korea	3–0	Iran
Choe Yu-ri 37'; Kim Hye-ri 59' (pen.); Ko Yoo-jin 75'	Report (AFC); Report (FIFA)

Gold Coast Stadium, Gold Coast
Attendance: 2,874
Referee: Veronika Bernatskaia (Kyrgyzstan)

GK	21	Kim Min-jeong
DF	5	Ko Yoo-jin (c)
DF	16	Jang Sel-gi
DF	19	Noh Jin-young
DF	20	Kim Hye-ri
MF	9	Mun Eun-ju
MF	10	Ji So-yun	(substituted off) 66'
MF	14	Jung Min-young
MF	23	Kang Chae-rim	(substituted off) 57'
FW	11	Choe Yu-ri	(substituted off) 57'
FW	17	Choi Yoo-jung	(substituted off) 57'
Substitutions:
MF	12	Song Jae-eun	(substituted on) 57'
MF	24	Lee Eun-young	(substituted on) 57'
MF	26	Kim Min-ji	(substituted on) 57'
MF	8	Kim Shin-ji	(substituted on) 66'
Manager:
Shin Sang-woo

GK	12	Maryam Yektaei
DF	2	Atefeh Imani	(yellow card) 25'
DF	4	Melika Motevalli
DF	13	Fatemeh Amineh
DF	14	Fatemeh Makhdoomi		(substituted off) 46'
DF	17	Shahnaz Jafarizadeh		(substituted off) 46'
MF	6	Zahra Sarbali
MF	8	Shabnam Beheshti		(substituted off) 46'
MF	16	Fatemeh Shaban
FW	7	Afsaneh Chatrenoor		(substituted off) 38'
FW	9	Zahra Ghanbari (c)
Substitutions:
FW	20	Sara Didar	(yellow card) 90'	(substituted on) 38'
MF	10	Fatemeh Pasandideh		(substituted on) 46'
MF	15	Mohaddeseh Zolfi		(substituted on) 46'
MF	23	Mona Hamoudi		(substituted on) 46'
Manager:
Marziyeh Jafari

Player of the Match:
(South Korea) Choe Yu-ri

Assistant referees:
Amal Badhafari (United Arab Emirates)
Riiohlang Dhar (India)
Fourth official:
Supiree Testhomya (Thailand)
Video assistant referee:
Mamdouh Al-Shadan (Saudi Arabia)
Assistant video assistant referee:
Meshari Al-Shamari (Qatar)

Statistics	South Korea	Iran
Possession	78.5%	21.5%
Shots	32	3
Shots on target	11	2
Passes	673	190
Fouls committed	4	10
Corner kicks	8	0

=== Philippines vs South Korea ===
5 March 2026
13:00 UTC+10

Philippines	0–3	South Korea
	Report (AFC); Report (FIFA)	Jeon Yu-gyeong 12'; Park Soo-jeong 15'; Mun Eun-ju 56'

Gold Coast Stadium, Gold Coast
Attendance: 2,332
Referee: Lê Thị Ly (Vietnam)

GK	1	Olivia McDaniel
RB	16	Sofia Wunsch
CB	3	Jessika Cowart
CB	5	Hali Long (c)
LB	13	Angela Beard
CM	9	Carleigh Frilles	(yellow card) 79'	(substituted off) 87'
MF	15	Isabella Pasion		(substituted off) 46'
CM	8	Sara Eggesvik		(substituted off) 74'
DF	17	Ariana Markey		(substituted off) 60'
CF	10	Chandler McDaniel		(substituted off) 46'
LF	21	Katrina Guillou
Substitutions:
FW	24	Mallie Ramirez		(substituted on) 46'
MF	14	Jourdyn Curran		(substituted on) 46'
FW	7	Jael-Marie Guy		(substituted on) 60'
MF	4	Natalie Oca	(yellow card) 90+3'	(substituted on) 74'
MF	19	Alessandrea Carpio		(substituted on) 87'
Manager:
(Australia) Mark Torcaso

GK	21	Kim Min-jeong		(substituted off) 87'
DF	2	Kim Jin-hui
DF	5	Ko Yoo-jin (c)		(substituted off) 87'
DF	22	Choo Hyo-joo	(yellow card) 53'
DF	25	Lee Min-hwa
MF	8	Kim Shin-ji	(yellow card) 73'	(substituted off) 78'
MF	9	Mun Eun-ju		(substituted off) 64'
MF	13	Park Soo-jeong
MF	14	Jung Min-young
FW	7	Son Hwa-yeon		(substituted off) 78'
FW	15	Jeon Yu-gyeong
Substitutions:
MF	26	Kim Min-ji		(substituted on) 64'
MF	24	Lee Eun-young		(substituted on) 78'
MF	12	Park Hye-jeong		(substituted on) 78'
CB	4	Shin Na-yeong		(substituted on) 87'
GK	18	Ryu Ji-soo		(substituted on) 87'
Manager:
Shin Sang-woo

Player of the Match:
(South Korea) Lee Min-hwa

Assistant referees:
Hà Thị Phượng (Vietnam)
Bao Mengxiao (China)
Fourth official:
Tian Jin (China)
Video assistant referee:
Muhammad Taqi (Singapore)
Assistant video assistant referee:
Sivakorn Pu-udom (Thailand)

Statistics	Philippines	South Korea
Possession	22.6%	77.4%
Shots	3	15
Shots on target	2	7
Passes	179	625
Fouls committed	10	15
Corner kicks	1	1

=== Iran vs Australia ===
5 March 2026
19:00 UTC+10

Iran	0–4	Australia
	Report (AFC); Report (FIFA)	Sayer 8'; Fowler 27'; Kennedy 35', 58'

Gold Coast Stadium, Gold Coast
Attendance: 22,398
Referee: Asaka Koizumi (Japan)

GK	12	Maryam Yektaei	(substituted off) 45'
DF	4	Melika Motevalli
DF	2	Atefeh Imani
DF	13	Fatemeh Amineh
DF	3	Atefeh Ramezanizadeh	(substituted off) 42'
DF	16	Fatemeh Amineh
MF	15	Mohaddeseh Zolfi	(substituted off) 45'
MF	8	Shabnam Behesht	(substituted off) 54'
MF	6	Zahra Sarbali
MF	23	Mona Hamoudi
FW	9	Zahra Ghanbari (c)	(substituted off) 90'
Substitutions:
MF	10	Fatemeh Pasandideh	(substituted on) 42'
FW	21	Golnoosh Khosravi	(substituted on) 45'
GK	1	Raha Yazdani	(substituted on) 45'
FW	20	Sara Didar	(substituted on) 54'
DF	24	Kosar Anbari	(substituted on) 90'
Manager:
Marziyeh Jafari

GK	12	Chloe Lincoln
DF	21	Ellie Carpenter		(substituted off) 72'
DF	24	Charlize Rule	(yellow card) 52'
DF	4	Clare Hunt		(substituted off) 72'
DF	2	Courtney Nevin
MF	17	Amy Sayer
MF	14	Alanna Kennedy
MF	10	Emily van Egmond
FW	11	Mary Fowler		(substituted off) 59'
FW	20	Sam Kerr (c)		(substituted off) 59'
FW	9	Caitlin Foord		(substituted off) 59'
Substitutions:
FW	25	Holly McNamara		(substituted on) 59'
FW	16	Hayley Raso		(substituted on) 59'	(substituted off) 90+11'
FW	26	Remy Siemsen		(substituted on) 59'
DF	7	Steph Catley		(substituted on) 72'
MF	8	Kaitlyn Torpey		(substituted on) 72'
FW	22	Michelle Heyman		(substituted on) 90+11'
Manager:
Joe Montemurro

Player of the Match:
(Australia) Emily van Egmond

Assistant referees:
Makoto Bozono (Japan)
Chihiro Ikki (Japan)
Fourth official:
Yoshimi Yamashita (Japan)
Video assistant referee:
Jumpei Iida (Japan)
Assistant video assistant referee:
Fu Ming (China)

Statistics	Iran	Australia
Possession	20.8%	79.2%
Shots	2	30
Shots on target	1	10
Passes	165	592
Fouls committed	1	2
Corner kicks	0	11

=== Iran vs Philippines ===
8 March 2026
19:00 UTC+10

Iran	0–2	Philippines
	Report (AFC); Report (FIFA)	Eggesvik 29'; C. McDaniel 82'

Gold Coast Stadium, Gold Coast
Attendance: 2,384
Referee: Tian Jin (China)

GK	1	Raha Yazdani
DF	4	Melika Motevalli
DF	2	Atefeh Imani
DF	13	Fatemeh Amineh		(substituted off) 60'
DF	6	Zahra Sarbali (c)	(yellow card) 34'
DF	16	Fatemeh Shaban		(substituted off) 71'
MF	14	Fatemeh Makhdoomi		(substituted off) 86'
MF	15	Mohaddeseh Zolfi
MF	18	Sana Sadeghi		(substituted off) 45'
MF	10	Fatemeh Pasandideh	(yellow card) 43'	(substituted off) 86'
FW	20	Sara Didar
Substitutions:
FW	9	Zahra Ghanbari		(substituted on) 45'
FW	21	Golnoosh Khosravi		(substituted on) 60'
FW	11	Maryam Dini		(substituted on) 71'
DF	5	Zahra Ahmadizadeh		(substituted on) 86'
FW	19	Roujin Tamrian		(substituted on) 86'
Manager:
Marziyeh Jafari

GK	1	Olivia McDaniel
DF	9	Carleigh Frilles
DF	3	Jessika Cowart
DF	5	Hali Long (c)
DF	13	Angela Beard
MF	7	Jael-Marie Guy	(substituted off) 63'
MF	21	Katrina Guillou
MF	6	Jaclyn Sawicki
MF	23	Alexa Pino	(substituted off) 50'
FW	24	Mallie Ramirez	(substituted off) 63'
FW	8	Sara Eggesvik	(substituted off) 87'
Substitutions:
DF	16	Sofia Wunsch	(substituted on) 50'
DF	17	Ariana Markey	(substituted on) 63'
FW	10	Chandler McDaniel	(substituted on) 63'
FW	19	Alessandrea Carpio	(substituted on) 87'
Manager:
(Australia) Mark Torcaso

Player of the Match:
(Philippines) Sara Eggesvik

Assistant referees:
Xie Lijun (China)
Bao Mengxiao (China)
Fourth official:
Dong Fangyu (China)
Video assistant referee:
Fu Ming (China)
Assistant video assistant referee:
Law Bik Chi (Hong Kong)

Statistics	Iran	Philippines
Possession	46.7%	53.3%
Shots	6	23
Shots on target	1	14
Passes	279	307
Fouls committed	9	6
Corner kicks	3	5

=== Australia vs South Korea ===
8 March 2026
20:00 UTC+11

Australia	3–3	South Korea
Kennedy 32', 90+8'; Kerr 45+6'	Report (AFC); Report (FIFA)	Mun Eun-ju 13'; Kim Shin-ji 53' (pen.); Kang Chae-rim 56'

Stadium Australia, Sydney
Attendance: 60,279
Referee: Yoshimi Yamashita (Japan)

GK	1	Mackenzie Arnold
DF	21	Ellie Carpenter
DF	3	Wini Heatley		(substituted off) 84'
DF	4	Clare Hunt	(yellow card) 39'
DF	7	Steph Catley		(substituted off) 19'
MF	6	Clare Wheeler		(substituted off) 71'
MF	14	Alanna Kennedy
MF	19	Katrina Gorry		(substituted off) 84'
FW	11	Mary Fowler
FW	20	Sam Kerr (c)
FW	9	Caitlin Foord	(yellow card) 90+8'
Substitutions:
DF	2	Courtney Nevin		(substituted on) 19'
MF	17	Amy Sayer		(substituted on) 71'
MF	23	Kyra Cooney-Cross		(substituted on) 84'
MF	10	Emily van Egmond		(substituted on) 84'
Manager:
Joe Montemurro

GK	21	Kim Min-jeong
DF	20	Kim Hye-ri
DF	5	Ko Yoo-jin (c)
DF	19	Noh Jin-young	(substituted off) 90+1'
DF	16	Jang Sel-gi
MF	11	Choe Yu-ri	(substituted off) 45'
MF	10	Ji So-yun	(substituted off) 71'
MF	14	Jung Min-young	(substituted off) 45'
MF	13	Park Soo-jeong
FW	9	Mun Eun-ju	(substituted off) 90+7'
FW	15	Jeon Yu-gyeong	(substituted off) 79'
Substitutions:
MF	23	Kang Chae-rim	(substituted on) 45'
MF	8	Kim Shin-ji	(substituted on) 45'
DF	2	Kim Jin-hui	(substituted on) 71'
FW	6	Casey Phair	(substituted on) 79'
DF	25	Lee Min-hwa	(substituted on) 90+1'
MF	26	Kim Min-ji	(substituted on) 90+7'
Manager:
Shin Sang-woo

Player of the Match:
(Australia) Alanna Kennedy

Assistant referees:
Makoto Bozono (Japan)
Chihiro Ikki (Japan)
Fourth official:
Asaka Koizumi (Japan)
Video assistant referee:
Jumpei Iida (Japan)
Assistant video assistant referee:
Meshari Al-Shamari (Qatar)

Statistics	Australia	South Korea
Possession	57.0%	43.0%
Shots	17	10
Shots on target	8	7
Passes	487	377
Fouls committed	7	7
Corner kicks	3	2

== Discipline ==
Disciplinary points would have been used as a tiebreaker in the group if teams were tied on overall and head-to-head records, with a lower number of disciplinary points ranking higher. Points were calculated based on yellow and red cards received by players and coaches in all group matches as follows:

- first yellow card: –1 point;
- indirect red card (second yellow card): –3 points;
- direct red card: –3 points;
- yellow card and direct red card: –4 points.

Team	Match 1				Match 2				Match 3				Points
Team	Booked	(yellow card) (yellow-red card)	Sent off (straight red)	(yellow card) (red card)	Booked	(yellow card) (yellow-red card)	Sent off (straight red)	(yellow card) (red card)	Booked	(yellow card) (yellow-red card)	Sent off (straight red)	(yellow card) (red card)	Points
Philippines					–2								–2
South Korea					–2								–2
Australia					–1				–2				–3
Iran	–2								–2				–4
