= Woo Seo-bin =

South Korean footballer (born 2004)

Woo Seo-bin 우서빈
Personal information
- Date of birth: 13 April 2004 (age 22)
- Height: 1.72 m (5 ft 7 1/2 in)
- Position: Goalkeeper

Team information
- Current team: Seoul City Amazones
- Number: 18

Youth career
- 2020–2022: Pohang Electronic Girls' High School
- 2023–2024: Uiduk University

Senior career*
Years	Team	Apps	(Gls)
2025–	Seoul City		

International career^{‡}
2018	South Korea U14	2	(0)
2019	South Korea U16		
2019	South Korea U17	5	(0)
2022–2024	South Korea U20	10	(0)
2025–	South Korea	1	(0)
- * Club domestic league appearances and goals ‡ National team caps and goals as of 05:32, 17 March 2026 (UTC)

Woo Seo-bin (Korean: 우서빈; born 13 April 2004) is a South Korean footballer who plays as a goalkeeper for Seoul City Amazones and the South Korea national team.

== Youth career ==
Woo began playing football at elementary school, and wanted to play as a goalkeeper from a young age. She continued her training at Pohang Hangdo Middle School alongside contemporaries Jeon Yu-gyeong and Park Soo-jeong. The trio were among those called up to play for South Korea at the 2019 AFC U-16 Women's Championship. Woo went on to play for Pohang Electronic Girls' High School. In her final year, the team achieved a 'treble' by winning the U-18 divisions of the Spring Korea Women's Football Championship, the Fall Korea Women's Football Championship, and the National Sports Festival. As a youth, Woo cited South Korean men's national team goalkeeper Jo Hyeon-woo as her role model.

Woo's footballing success continued at Uiduk University. In 2023, Uiduk won three domestic tournaments. Woo also earned individual praise, receiving the Best Goalkeeper award at the 22nd National Women's Football Championship.

During the season Woo had also picked up the Best Goalkeeper award at the 2024 Spring Korea Women's Football Championship, and received particular attention for her performance in the penalty shootout held to determine the winner of the 105th National Sports Festival.

== Club career ==
Woo was selected by Seoul City as their first round pick at the 2025 WK League draft, signing a three-year contract with the club. She made her league debut in Seoul's first round fixture against Gyeongju KHNP. Woo was named Player of the Match after the 2025 WK League playoff match between Seoul and Incheon Hyundai Steel Red Angels, which saw Seoul progress to the championship final for the first time in twelve years. Woo received the Best New Player award at the 2025 KWFF awards ceremony, becoming the first goalkeeper ever to receive the award.

Early in the 2026 WK League season, with injuries affecting Seoul's small squad, Woo made several appearances in an outfield position before sustaining an ankle injury that required surgery and missing much of the season.

== International career ==
In 2022, while still at high school, Woo was named in South Korea’s squad for the 2022 FIFA U-20 Women’s World Cup. She was manager Park Yoon-jung's first choice goalkeeper at the 2024 AFC U-20 Women's Asian Cup but missed the team's third place playoff match against Australia after sustaining a head injury during the semi-final clash with North Korea.

At the 2024 FIFA U-20 Women's World Cup, Woo played a key role in South Korea's victory over Germany, which saw them progress to the Round of 16. At the tournament, South Korea conceded only two goals in four matches. Despite the team's exit from the competition after a loss to Colombia in the Round of 16, Woo was praised for her timing and judgment under pressure.

Woo received her first senior call-up for South Korea in 2025 under manager Shin Sang-woo. She was a member of the South Korean squad that won the 2025 EAFF E-1 Football Championship. Woo made her A match debut at the 2026 AFC Women's Asian Cup, where she was brought on as a substitute in the second half of South Korea's quarter final match against Uzbekistan.

== Honours ==
=== Uiduk University ===
- Spring Korea Women's Football Championship (Winners): 2023, 2024
- Fall Korea Women's Football Championship (Winners): 2024
- National Women's Football Championship (Winners): 2023, 2024
- National Sports Festival (Winners): 2023, 2024
- Develon 2024 Korea Women's Football Awards: Best University Team: 2024

=== Seoul City Amazones ===
- WK League (Runners-up): 2025

=== South Korea ===
- EAFF E-1 Football Championship (Winners): 2025

=== Individual ===
- Develon 2024 Korea Women's Football Awards: Best Goalkeeper (university division): 2024
- 2025 Korea Women's Football Awards: Best New Player (WK League): 2025
