= Ko Yoo-jin =

South Korean footballer (born 1997)

Personal information
- Date of birth: January 24, 1997
- Place of birth: South Korea
- Height: 1.70 m (5 ft 7 in)
- Position: Defender

Team information
- Current team: Incheon Hyundai
- Number: 5

Youth career
- 2010–2012: Oju Middle School
- 2013–2015: Hyundai High School
- 2016–2019: Korea University

Senior career*
| Years | Team | Apps | (Gls) |
| 2020–2022 | Hwacheon KSPO | 57 | (1) |
| 2023– | Incheon Hyundai | | |

International career^{‡}
| 2010 | South Korea U14 | 0 | (0) |
| 2013 | South Korea U17 | 1 | (0) |
| 2015–2016 | South Korea U20 | 7 | (0) |
| 2019 | South Korea Universiade | 4 | (1) |
| 2022– | South Korea | 11 | (2) |
- * Club domestic league appearances and goals ‡ National team caps and goals as of 06:19, 18 May 2026 (UTC)

Ko Yoo-jin (Korean: 고유진, born 24 January 1997) is a South Korean professional footballer who plays as a defender for WK League club Incheon Hyundai and the South Korea national team.

== Youth career ==
Ko was inspired to play football by her father's love of the sport and enrolled in the girls' football academy at Shimwon Elementary School to start playing more seriously. She progressed to the U15 academy at Oju Middle School, then the U18 team at Hyundai High School, where she was team captain in her final year.

Ko initially played as a forward, but after changing position to become a defender, during her time at university she received accolades such as tournament MVP and second-highest goalscorer. In 2019 Ko captained the Korea University football team, leading them to victories in the Spring Women's Football Championship and the Queen's Cup.

== Club career ==
Ko was the first player selected at the 2020 WK League new players draft, signing a three-year contract with Hwacheon KSPO. She transferred to Incheon Hyundai Steel Red Angels ahead of the 2023 season.

== International career ==
Ko was first called up to South Korea's senior side in 2022. However, she did not make any appearances and was subsequently absent from the squad until 2025, when she was selected by new manager Shin Sang-woo and made her full international debut in a friendly match against Australia. Following her debut, she became a fixture in Shin's squad, making five further appearances in the same year before leading South Korea as captain upon her major tournament debut at the 2026 AFC Women's Asian Cup. Ko scored her debut international goal in South Korea's first match of the tournament in a 3–0 victory against Iran.

== Career statistics ==
=== International ===
Scores and results list South Korea's goal tally first, score column indicates score after each Yoo-jin goal.

List of international goals scored by Ko Yoo-jin
| No. | Date | Venue | Opponent | Score | Result | Competition |
|---|---|---|---|---|---|---|
| 1 | 2 March 2026 | Gold Coast Stadium, Gold Coast, Australia | Iran | 3–0 | 3–0 | 2026 AFC Women's Asian Cup |
| 2 | 14 March 2026 | Stadium Australia, Sydney, Australia | Uzbekistan | 2–0 | 6–0 | 2026 AFC Women's Asian Cup |
| 3 | 3 June 2026 | GFA National Training Center, Dededo, Guam | Guam | 5–0 | 5–0 | 2028 EAFF E-1 Football Championship |
| 4 | 17 September 2026 | Nagai Stadium, Osaka, Japan | Bangladesh | 6–0 | 6–0 | 2026 Asian Games |

== Honours ==
=== Ulsan Hyundai High School (previously Hyundai Technical High School) ===
- National Women's Football Championship U18 winners: 2015
- National Sports Festival U18 winners: 2013, 2014
- Fall Women's Football Championship U18 winners: 2013, 2014

=== Korea University ===
- Spring Women's Football Championship University winners: 2019
- Queen's Cup University winners: 2019

=== Incheon Hyundai Steel Red Angels ===
- WK League winners: 2023

=== South Korea ===
- EAFF E-1 Football Championship winners: 2025
