= Veronika Bernatskaia =

Kyrgyz football referee (born 1992)

- Born: 1991 or 1992 (age 34–35); Kyrgyzstan

Domestic
Years	League	Role
??–present	Kyrgyz Football Leagues	Referee

International
Years	League	Role
2018–present	FIFA listed	Referee

Veronika Bernatskaia (Kyrgyz: Вероника Бернацкая; born 1991 or 1992) is a Kyrgyz football referee and former football player who has been on the FIFA International Referees List since 2018.

== Career ==
Bernatskaia began her football career playing for a local club and later ascended to become part of the squad of the Kyrgyzstan women's national football team, being recognized as a defender by the Kyrgyz league. After quitting her playing career, Bernatskaia pursued a career as a referee, officiating matches at the Kyrgyz Premier League and attaining the FIFA badge in 2018.

She has represented Kyrgyzstan at the international level in several Asian tournaments, including the 2022 and 2023 editions of the AFC Women's Club Championship, the 2022 Asian Games, and the 2024 AFC U-17 Women's Asian Cup. At the Asian Games, Bernatskaia oversaw the 2022 final between Japan and North Korea and she refereed the final game between North Korea and Japan at the 2024 U-17 tournament.

That same year, she was appointed as a support referee for the women's tournament of the 2024 Summer Olympics and later officiated two group stage matches at the 2024 FIFA U-20 Women's World Cup: Ghana v. Austria and Netherlands v. Argentina.

In the 2026 AFC Women's Asian Cup refereed four matches: South Korea v. Iran (Group A), India v. Japan (Group C), a quarterfinal between Australia v. North Korea, and a semifinal between South Korea and Japan.

In 2023, Bernatskaia was distinguished as "Pride of Kyrgyz Football" at the 2023 Awards by the Kyrgyz Football Union.
