= Bae Ye-bin =

South Korean footballer (born 2004)

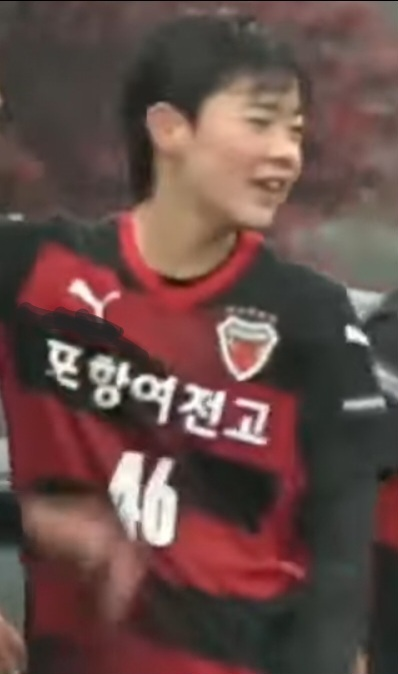

Personal information
- Date of birth: 7 December 2004 (age 21)
- Place of birth: Pohang, Gyeongsangbuk-do, South Korea
- Height: 1.63 m (5 ft 4 in)
- Position: Midfielder

Youth career
- 2014-2016: Sangdae Elementary School
- 2017-2019: Pohang Hangdo Middle School
- 2020-2022: Pohang Girls' Electrical High School
- 2023-2024: Uiduk University

Senior career*
Years	Team	Apps	(Gls)
2025-	Incheon Hyundai		

International career
2022–	South Korea U20	8	(1)
2022–	South Korea	3	(0)
- * Club domestic league appearances and goals

Bae Ye-bin (Korean: 배예빈; born 7 December 2004) is a South Korean footballer who plays as a midfielder for WK League side Incheon Hyundai Steel Red Angels and the South Korea national team.

== Early life ==
Bae was born in Pohang, South Korea, and began playing football in the fourth grade of elementary school. She has a younger sister, Bae Yoon-kyung, who also plays football.

== Youth career ==
Bae attended Sangdae Elementary School, Pohang Hangdo Middle School, and Pohang Girls' Electrical High School, all known for their girls' football programmes. She then played for Uiduk University, helping her team to claim victory in four national tournaments in 2024.

== Club career ==
In the 2025 WK League new players draft, Bae was signed in the second round of the draft by Incheon Hyundai Steel Red Angels.

== International career ==
Bae was part of the South Korea U-20 squad that finished in third place at the 2024 AFC U-20 Women's Asian Cup and reached the round of 16 at the 2024 FIFA U-20 Women's World Cup.

Bae received her first senior call up in 2022. She was a member of South Korea's squad at the 2023 FIFA Women's World Cup.
