= Jeong Da-bin (footballer) =

South Korean footballer (born 2005)

Personal information
- Date of birth: September 5, 2005 (age 21)
- Height: 1.73 m (5 ft 8 in)
- Position: Striker

Team information
- Current team: Stabæk
- Number: 10

Youth career
- -2017: Hanam Jungang Elementary School
- 2018-2020: Seolbong Middle School
- 2021-2023: Gwangyang Girls' High School
- 2024-2025: Korea University

Senior career*
Years	Team	Apps	(Gls)
2025-	Stabæk		

International career^{‡}
2019	South Korea U-14	2	(0)
2023-2024	South Korea U-20	9	(2)
2025-	South Korea	7	(2)
- * Club domestic league appearances and goals ‡ National team caps and goals as of 05:48, 15 September 2026 (UTC)

Jeong Da-bin (Korean: 정다빈; born 5 September 2005) is a South Korean footballer who plays as a striker for Toppserien club Stabæk Fotball and the South Korean national team.

== Youth career ==
Jeong started playing football as an elementary schooler, initially playing with a boys' team as a hobby before taking up the sport more seriously after transferring to Hanam Jungang Elementary School. She gave up football for a year at around the time she started middle school due to her parents' concerns about her pursuing a career as an athlete, but eventually returned to the sport and soon started to gain recognition as an emerging talent.

In her first year at Gwangyang Girls' High School, she played a key role in the team's 2021 KWFF Spring Championship victory, scoring six goals and winning the tournament's golden boot award. In her final year at high school, Jeong was the team captain, leading Gwangyang Girls' High to a second consecutive victory at the Queen's Cup, as well as wins at the National Women's Football Championship and the National Sports Festival.

Jeong began playing for Korea University in 2024, repeating her 2021 Spring Championship success by scoring six goals and winning the golden boot at the 2024 edition of the same tournament as KU lifted the trophy in the college division. During her time at KU, Jeong became known as the "baby one-top" for her talent as a goalscoring striker despite being one of the youngest players. Besides scoring goals, Jeong also gained attention for her heading and success in duels.

== Club career ==
Jeong signed with Stabæk Fotball in July 2025, becoming the second South Korean woman to play professional football in Norway. After just three appearances for the club, Jeong sustained a knee injury that left her unable to play for several months.

== International career ==
Having represented her country at youth level, including at the 2024 FIFA U-20 Women's World Cup, Jeong received her first senior call-up for South Korea in 2025 under manager Shin Sang-woo. She made her full international debut at the 2025 Pink Ladies Cup, opening the scoring for South Korea in the side's 4–0 victory against Thailand. At the 2025 EAFF E-1 Football Championship, Jeong scored a crucial late equaliser in South Korea's match against Japan to keep her team's hope of lifting the trophy alive. South Korea went on to win the tournament for the first time in 20 years.

== Career statistics ==
=== International ===
As of match played 16 July 2025

Appearances and goals by national team and year
National team	Year	Apps	Goals
South Korea	2025	7	2
Total		7	2

Scores and results list South Korea's goal tally first, score column indicates score after each Jeong Da-bin goal.

List of international goals scored by Jeong Da-bin
No.	Date	Venue	Opponent	Score	Result	Competition	Ref.
1	23 February 2025	Al Hamriya Sports Club Stadium, Al Hamriyah, United Arab Emirates	Thailand	1–0	4–0	2025 Pink Ladies Cup	
2	13 July 2025	Hwaseong Sports Complex, Hwaseong, South Korea	Japan	1–1	1–1	2025 EAFF E-1 Football Championship	
3	17 September 2026	Nagai Stadium, Osaka, Japan	Bangladesh	2–0	6–0	2026 Asian Games	

== Honours ==
=== Gwangyang Girls' High School ===
- KWFF Spring Championship U-18 winners: 2021, 2023
- National Women's Football Championship U-18 winners: 2023
- Queen's Cup U-18 winners: 2022, 2023
- National Sports Festival U-18 winners: 2023

=== Korea University ===
- KWFF Spring Championship university winners: 2024, 2025

=== South Korea ===
- Pink Ladies Cup winners: 2025
- EAFF E-1 Football Championship winners: 2025

=== Individual ===
- KWFF Spring Championship U-18 top goalscorer: 2021
- KWFF Spring Championship university top goalscorer: 2024
