= Kang Chae-rim =

South Korean footballer

Kang Chae-rim 강채림
Personal information
- Date of birth: 23 March 1998 (age 28)
- Place of birth: South Korea
- Height: 1.63 m (5 ft 4 in)
- Position: Midfielder

Team information
- Current team: Gangjin Swans
- Number: 47

Senior career*
Years	Team	Apps	(Gls)
2019–2023	Hyundai Steel Red Angels		
2024–2025	Suwon FC		
2025–2026	Montreal Roses FC	17	(3)
2026–	Gangjin Swans	0	(0)

International career^{‡}
2013	South Korea U16	2	(0)
2016	South Korea U17	3	(0)
2015–2017	South Korea U19	6	(0)
2016	South Korea U20	3	(0)
2019–	South Korea	42	(8)
Medal record
Women's football
Representing China
Asian Games
Bronze medal – third place	2026 Aichi–Nagoya	Team
- * Club domestic league appearances and goals as of 26 June 2026 ‡ National team caps and goals as of 22:05, 16 July 2025 (UTC)

Kang Chae-rim (Korean: 강채림; born 23 March 1998) is a South Korean footballer who plays as a midfielder for Gangjin Swans and the South Korea women's national team.

== Club career ==
Kang joined Hyundai Steel Red Angels through the 2019 WK League Draft.

In January 2024, Kang signed with Suwon FC.

In August 2025, she joined Canadian Northern Super League club Montreal Roses FC. In June 2026, she was granted a mutual termination of her contract, after requesting one in order to return to Asia to be closer to her family. She subsequently joined WK League side Gangjin Swans.

== International career ==
In 2018, Kang served as a training player with the South Korea national team. She earned his first call-up the following year, making her debut on 9 April 2019 in a friendly match against Iceland. She scored her first international goals on 15 December 2019, scoring twice in a 3-0 victory over Chinese Taipei.

== Career statistics ==
=== International ===
As of 16 July 2025

South Korea
Year	Apps	Goals
2019	9	2
2020	2	0
2021	2	2
2022	8	2
2023	9	2
2024	5	0
2025	7	0
Total	42	8

==== International goals ====
Scores and results list South Korea's goal tally first.

No.	Date	Venue	Opponent	Score	Result	Competition
1.	15 December 2019	Busan Asiad Main Stadium, Busan, South Korea	Chinese Taipei	1–0	3–0	2019 EAFF E-1 Football Championship
2.	15 December 2019	Busan Asiad Main Stadium, Busan, South Korea	Chinese Taipei	2–0	3–0	2019 EAFF E-1 Football Championship
3.	8 April 2021	Goyang Stadium, Goyang, South Korea	China	1–1	1–2	2020 AFC Women's Olympic Qualifying Tournament
4.	13 April 2021	Suzhou Olympic Sports Centre, Suzhou, China	China	1–0	2–2 (a.e.t.)	2020 AFC Women's Olympic Qualifying Tournament
5.	9 April 2022	Goyang Stadium, Goyang, South Korea	Vietnam	2–0	3–0	Friendly
6.	26 July 2022	Kashima Soccer Stadium, Kashima, Japan	Chinese Taipei	2–0	4–0	2022 EAFF E-1 Football Championship
7.	26 October 2023	Xiamen Egret Stadium, Xiamen, China	Thailand	3–0	10–1	2024 AFC Women's Olympic Qualifying Tournament
8.	26 October 2023	Xiamen Egret Stadium, Xiamen, China	Thailand	5–0	10–1	2024 AFC Women's Olympic Qualifying Tournament
9.	8 March 2026	Stadium Australia, Sydney, Australia	Australia	3–2	3–3	2026 AFC Women's Asian Cup
10.	18 March 2026	Stadium Australia, Sydney, Australia	Japan	1–3	1–4	2026 AFC Women's Asian Cup
