= Park Soo-jeong (footballer) =

South Korean footballer (born 2004)

Park Soo–jeong
Personal information
- Date of birth: 3 November 2004 (age 22)
- Place of birth: South Korea
- Height: 1.61 m (5 ft 3 in)
- Position: Midfielder

Team information
- Current team: AC Milan
- Number: 14

Youth career
- 2015–2016: Sangdae E.S.
- 2017–2019: Pohang Hangdo M.S.
- 2020–2022: Pohang Electronic Girls' H.S.
- 2023–2025: Ulsan College

Senior career*
Years	Team	Apps	(Gls)
2025–	AC Milan	11	(1)

International career^{‡}
2017–2018	South Korea U14	3	(1)
2019	South Korea U17	6	(9)
2023–2024	South Korea U20	13	(4)
2025–	South Korea	7	(2)
- * Club domestic league appearances and goals as of 06:32, 21 December 2025 (UTC) ‡ National team caps and goals as of 13:30, 27 August 2025 (UTC)

Park Soo-jeong (Korean: 박수정; born 3 November 2004) is a South Korean professional footballer who plays as a midfielder for Serie A club AC Milan and the South Korea women's national team.

== Youth career ==
Park's football career began in the girls' football academy of Sangdae Elementary School in Pohang. As an elementary schooler, she gained attention for her speed, technical ability and judgment, earning the Cha Bum-kun national award for 'best female player' in 2017. She continued playing at Pohang Hangdo Middle School and Pohang Electronic Girls' High School, receiving various team and individual honours.

After graduating from high school, Park went on to play for Ulsan College, where she continued to demonstrate her talent and goalscoring ability in domestic tournaments, while also making appearances for South Korea's youth teams.

== Club career ==
In July 2025, Park signed her first professional contract with AC Milan, becoming the club's first ever South Korean player and the second South Korean woman to join an Italian club, after Kim Shin-ji.

== International career ==
Park played for the South Korea U-20 team at the 2024 U-20 Women's Asian Cup, reaching the semi-finals and earning qualification for the U-20 Women's World Cup, where she scored a goal against Germany to take Korea into the knockout stage of the tournament. She received her first senior call-up in 2025 under manager Shin Sang-woo for a pair of friendly matches against Colombia.

== Career statistics ==
=== International ===
Scores and results list South Korea's goal tally first, score column indicates score after each Soo-jeong goal.

List of international goals scored by Park Soo-jeong
No.	Date	Venue	Opponent	Score	Result	Competition
1	5 March 2026	Gold Coast Stadium, Gold Coast, Australia	Philippines	2–0	3–0	2026 AFC Women's Asian Cup
2	14 March 2026	Stadium Australia, Sydney, Australia	Uzbekistan	3–0	6–0	2026 AFC Women's Asian Cup
3	12 April 2026	Arena Pantanal, Cuiabá, Brazil	Brazil	1–5	1–5	2026 FIFA Series
