= Lee Eun-young (footballer) =

South Korean footballer

Personal information
- Date of birth: 31 March 2002 (age 24)
- Place of birth: Changwon, South Korea
- Height: 1.73 m (5 ft 8 in)
- Positions: Forward; defender

Team information
- Current team: Molde FK
- Number: 16

Youth career
- 2010–2014: Myeongseo Elementary School
- 2015–2017: Hyundai Chungun Middle School
- 2018–2020: Hyundai High School
- 2021–2023: Korea University

Senior career*
Years	Team	Apps	(Gls)
2024–2025	Changnyeong WFC	28	(3)
2026–	Molde FK	0	(0)

International career^{‡}
2015–2016	South Korea U-14	11	(8)
2016–2018	South Korea U-17	14	(0)
2019–2022	South Korea U-20	7	(0)
2023	South Korea Universities	1	(0)
2020–	South Korea	25	(2)
- * Club domestic league appearances and goals as of 14 March 2026 ‡ National team caps and goals as of 30 May 2025

Lee Eun-young (Korean: 이은영) is a South Korean footballer who plays as a forward for Toppserien club Molde FK and as a defender for the South Korean national team.

== Early life ==
Lee was born in the southern city of Changwon. She began playing football for fun in the second grade of elementary school and was inspired by the South Korean team that won the 2010 U-17 Women's World Cup. She started taking football more seriously after a coach at her school's after-school football programme recognised her talent and encouraged her to join a local club. After graduating from high school, Lee continued to play football as a student at Korea University.

== Club career ==
She was the first player to be selected in the 2024 WK League draft, signing a three-year contract with Changnyeong WFC. In her debut season, she made 28 appearances, scoring three goals, and was awarded the Best New Player award at the 2024 Korean Women's Football Awards.

In February 2026, Lee signed a two-and-a-half-year contract with Norwegian Toppserien side Molde FK, becoming the club's second South Korean player after Jeon Yu-gyeong. This was her first signing with a club outside South Korea.

== International career ==
Lee was selected for the South Korea U-14 team in 2015 and began to stand out for her goalscoring ability, even scoring six goals in one match during the 2016 AFC U-14 Girls' Championship. At 17, she was selected for the South Korea U-20 squad, and received her first senior call-up the following year. She made her senior international debut at the 2023 Arnold Clark Cup and scored her first goal for South Korea at senior level against Myanmar at the 2022 Asian Games in Hangzhou, China.

=== International goals ===
Scores and results list South Korea's goal tally first, score column indicates score after each Eun-young goal.

List of international goals scored by Lee Eun-young
No.	Date	Venue	Opponent	Score	Result	Competition
1	22 September 2023	Wenzhou Sports Centre, Wenzhou, China	Myanmar	1–0	3–0	2022 Asian Games
2	14 March 2026	Stadium Australia, Sydney, Australia	Uzbekistan	5–0	6–0	2026 AFC Women's Asian Cup

== Style of play ==
At 1.73 m (5 ft 8 in) tall, Lee is known for her speed and strength. Although she played as a striker for Changnyeong WFC, she has played as a defender for the national team, which she has credited as being helpful in developing her offensive play. She has cited Son Hwa-yeon and Moon Mi-ra as inspirations.
