= Kim Jin-hui (footballer) =

South Korean footballer (born 1998)

Personal information
- Full name: Kim Jin-hui
- Date of birth: October 7, 1998 (age 28)
- Height: 1.67 m (5 ft 6 in)
- Position: Defender

Team information
- Current team: Gyeongju KHNP
- Number: 2

Youth career
- 2014-2016: Daegu Dongbu High School
- 2017-2018: Uiduk University

Senior career*
Years	Team	Apps	(Gls)
2019-2021	Changnyeong WFC		
2022-	Gyeongju KHNP		

International career^{‡}
2013	South Korea U17	2	(0)
2016-2017	South Korea U20	7	(1)
2019	South Korea Universiade	5	(0)
2024-	South Korea	13	(0)
- * Club domestic league appearances and goals ‡ National team caps and goals as of 06:54, 18 May 2026 (UTC)

Kim Jin-hui (Korean: 김진희; born October 7, 1998) is a South Korean footballer who plays as a defender for WK League club Gyeongju KHNP and South Korea.

== Club career ==
Kim attended Daegu Dongbu High School, the only high school in Daegu with a girls' football programme. At school, she played as a forward, although she played in defence when representing South Korea at youth level. She went on to play for Uiduk University.

In the 2019 WK League new player draft, Kim was signed by Changnyeong WFC as their first round selection. After completing a three-year contract with Changnyeong, Kim transferred to Gyeongju KHNP ahead of the 2022 season.

== International career ==
Kim was a member of South Korea's squad at the 2016 FIFA U-20 Women's World Cup. She received her first senior call-up in 2019 when she was named in the squad for a match against the United States. Kim made her senior international debut in 2024, coming on as a substitute in a friendly against Japan. She was selected to play at the 2025 EAFF E-1 Football Championship but was withdrew from the squad due to an injury. Kim's first major tournament was the 2026 AFC Women's Asian Cup.
