= Lee Hyo-kyeong =

South Korean footballer

Personal information
- Date of birth: 12 February 1997 (age 29)
- Place of birth: South Korea
- Height: 1.67 m (5 ft 6 in)
- Position: Defender

Team information
- Current team: Gangjin Swans
- Number: 15

Senior career*
Years	Team	Apps	(Gls)
2018-2022	Albirex Niigata	4	(0)
2023-2025	Sejong Sportstoto		
2026-	Gangjin Swans		

International career^{‡}
2016	South Korea U20	2	(0)
2019	South Korea	3	(1)
- * Club domestic league appearances and goals as of 26 November 2022 ‡ National team caps and goals as of 03:45, 21 July 2026 (UTC)

Lee Hyo-kyeong (born 12 February 1997) is a South Korean professional footballer who plays as a defender for WK League club Gangjin Swans WFC and the South Korea women's national team.

== Early life ==
Hailing from the southwestern city of Mokpo, Lee is the second of five sisters. She began playing football while in the third grade at Mokpo Buseol Elementary School. She was the first girl to play in the Mokpo Mayor's Cup football tournament, attracting the attention of local football coaches and scouts. Her youngest sisters Lee Hyo-joo and Lee Ha-sun followed her into football, both playing at elite level as youths.

== Youth career ==
Upon graduating from elementary school, Lee pursued football more seriously, moving to Gwangyang, where she could play for the elite girls' academy side at Gwangyeong Middle School. Lee continued her youth career at Gwangyang Girls' High School. She then became the first Korean to play for a Japanese university side when she moved to Hokuriku University. During her youth career, Lee suffered from a series of anterior cruciate ligament injuries.

== Club career ==
Lee signed with Albirex Niigata Ladies in 2018. Having spent the 2018 season on the bench, Lee made her debut for Niigata in the club's first match of 2019 and went on to make 25 appearances in the 2019 Nadeshiko League season.

Lee made her WE League debut with Albirex Niigata on 12 September 2021.

Lee joined Sejong Sportstoto ahead of the 2023 WK League season. She became club captain in 2024.

In 2026 Lee moved to newly established side Gangjin Swans, becoming the club's first captain. She scored the opening goal in the Swans' shock away win against Suwon FC in round 5 of the 2026 WK League.

== International career ==
Within a few months of deciding to pursue football seriously, Lee began playing for South Korea at youth level, serving as captain of the country's U-13 side. She later also captained South Korea's U-16 side, including at the 2013 AFC U-16 Women's Championship. Lee played for the South Korea U-20 team at the 2016 FIFA U-20 Women's World Cup.

Lee received her first senior call-up for South Korea in 2019 ahead of a pair of friendly matches against the U.S.A. She scored her debut international goal in 2024 in a friendly against Canada.

== International goals ==
No.	Date	Venue	Opponent	Score	Result	Competition	Ref.
1.	3 December 2024	Pinatar Arena, San Pedro del Pinatar, Spain	Canada	1–3	1–5	Friendly	
