= Lee Min-hwa =

South Korean footballer (born 1999)

Personal information
- Date of birth: October 29, 1999 (age 27)
- Height: 1.69 m (5 ft 7 in)
- Position: Defender

Team information
- Current team: Hwacheon KSPO
- Number: 20

Youth career
- 2012-2014: Jinju Girls' Middle School
- 2015-2017: Gwangyang Girls' High School
- 2018-2019: Ulsan College

Senior career*
Years	Team	Apps	(Gls)
2020-	Hwacheon KSPO	112	(0)

International career^{‡}
2025-	South Korea	7	(0)
- * Club domestic league appearances and goals as of 04:25, 27 April 2026 (UTC) ‡ National team caps and goals as of 04:25, 27 April 2026 (UTC)

Lee Min-hwa (Korean: 이민화) is a South Korean professional footballer who plays as a defender for WK League club Hwacheon KSPO and the South Korean national team. She played at the 2026 AFC Women's Asian Cup.

== Club career ==
Lee was selected by Hwacheon KSPO in the second round of the 2020 WK League new players draft. In 2024, after KSPO finished as WK League runners-up, Lee was named in the Korea Pro Footballers Association (KPFA) WK League Best XI. The following year, Hwacheon won their first WK League title to complete a domestic treble, and Lee was again recognised as a key player, being named in the WK League Best XI at the KWFF WK League Awards.

== International career ==
Lee received her first senior call-up for South Korea in 2024 under newly appointed manager Shin Sang-woo. She made her international debut the following year in a friendly match against Colombia and was subsequently added to South Korea's squad for the 2025 EAFF E-1 Football Championship.

== Honours ==
=== Hwacheon KSPO ===
- WK League
  - Champions: 2025
  - Runners-up: 2024
- National Women's Football Championship
  - Champions: 2025
- National Sports Festival
  - Champions: 2025

=== South Korea ===
- EAFF E-1 Football Championship
  - Champions: 2025

=== Individual ===
- KPFA 2024 WK League Awards
  - Best XI: 2024
- KWFF WK League Awards
  - Best XI: 2025
