= Kim Min-jung (footballer) =

South Korean footballer

Kim Min-jung 김민정
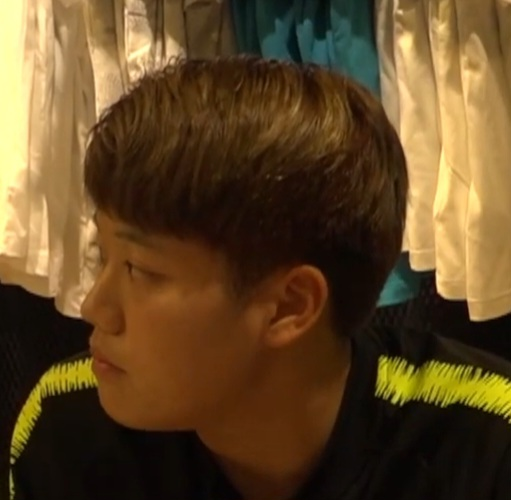

Personal information
- Date of birth: 12 September 1996 (age 30)
- Height: 1.75 m (5 ft 9 in)
- Position: Goalkeeper

Team information
- Current team: Incheon Hyundai
- Number: 33

Youth career
- 2009–2011: Oju Middle School
- 2012-2014: Dongsan Information High School
- 2016: Daeduk University

Senior career*
Years	Team	Apps	(Gls)
2017	Suwon FMC	10	(0)
2018–	Incheon Hyundai		

International career^{‡}
2010	South Korea U14	0	(0)
2015–2016	South Korea U20	10	(0)
2015	South Korea Universiade		
2016–	South Korea	23	(0)
- * Club domestic league appearances and goals ‡ National team caps and goals as of 06:16, 17 April 2026 (UTC)

Kim Min-jung (born 12 September 1996) is a South Korean footballer who plays as a goalkeeper for Incheon Hyundai Steel Red Angels and the South Korea national team.

== Youth career ==
While at school, Kim progressed through the South Korea national age group teams playing as a defender, and only switched to playing as a goalkeeper during her second year of high school on the advice of manager Yoo Young-sil. She went on to play for Daeduk University.

== Club career ==
Kim was selected by Suwon FMC in the 2017 WK League draft and joined the club on a one year contract, playing in ten matches during her first season in the league. After a year at Suwon, Kim transferred to Incheon Hyundai Steel Red Angels ahead of the 2018 WK League season.

== International career ==
Kim played ten matches for the South Korea U20 team between 2015 and 2016 and was a member of the squad for the 2016 FIFA U-20 Women's World Cup. She was named Player of the Match after South Korea's clash with Venezuela, in which she successfully saved a penalty.

Kim made her full international debut on 7 June 2016 in a friendly match against Myanmar. Despite her relative lack of A match experience, she was unexpectedly selected to play at the 2019 FIFA Women's World Cup when veteran keepers Kim Jung-mi and Yoon Young-geul were both unavailable due to injury and Kang Ga-ae, who had been expected to play instead, suffered an injury in training.
