= Jung Min-young =

South Korean footballer (born 2000)

Jung Min-young 정민영
Personal information
- Date of birth: 28 September 2000 (age 26)
- Place of birth: South Korea
- Height: 1.63 m (5 ft 4 in)
- Position: Midfielder

Team information
- Current team: Ottawa Rapid FC

College career
| Years | Team | Apps | (Gls) |
- Korea University

Senior career*
| Years | Team | Apps | (Gls) |
| 2023–2025 | Seoul City Hall | | |
| 2026– | Ottawa Rapid FC | 22 | (1) |

International career^{‡}
| 2014 | South Korea U14 | 5 | (2) |
| 2015 | South Korea U16 | 3 | (1) |
| 2016–2020 | South Korea U20 | 10 | (2) |
| 2025– | South Korea | 4 | (1) |
Medal record
Women's football
Representing China
Asian Games
| Bronze medal – third place | 2026 Aichi–Nagoya | Team |
- * Club domestic league appearances and goals as of 30 October 2026 ‡ National team caps and goals as of 16 July 2025

Jung Min-young (Korean: 정민영; born 28 September 2000) is a South Korean footballer who plays for Ottawa Rapid FC in the Northern Super League and the South Korea women's national team.

== University career ==
Jung played football with the Korea University women's football team, where she served as team captain.

== Club career ==
Jung played three seasons with Seoul City Hall in the WK League.

In 2026, she signed with Canadian club Ottawa Rapid FC in the Northern Super League.

== International career ==
In November 2020, Jung was called up to a camp with the South Korea U20 for the fourth time.

Jung was called up to the South Korea senior team for the first time for the a set of friendlies against Australia. On 2 June 2025, she made her national team debut, in a friendly against Colombia, scoring her first international goal just 84 seconds into the match. Afterwards, she played at the 2025 EAFF E-1 Football Championship, helping South Korea win the title.

== Career statistics ==
=== International ===
As of 26 February 2025

South Korea
| Year | Apps | Goals |
|---|---|---|
| 2025 | 4 | 1 |
| Total | 4 | 1 |
