= Kim Shin-ji =

South Korean footballer (born 2004)

Personal information
- Date of birth: May 3, 2004 (age 22)
- Place of birth: Busan, South Korea
- Height: 1.70 m (5 ft 7 in)
- Position: Midfielder

Team information
- Current team: Alavés (on loan from AS Roma)

Youth career
- -2016: Sangdae Elementary School
- 2017-2019: Pohang Hangdo Middle School
- 2020–2022: Pohang Girls' Electrical High School
- 2023–2024: Uiduk University

Senior career*
Years	Team	Apps	(Gls)
2025–	AS Roma	1	(0)
2025–2026	→ Rangers (loan)	16	(3)
2026–	→ Alavés (loan)	0	(0)

International career^{‡}
2019	South Korea U-17	5	(3)
2024	South Korea U-20	15	(2)
2024–	South Korea	19	(2)
- * Club domestic league appearances and goals as of 02:04, 9 March 2026 (UTC) ‡ National team caps and goals as of 05:00, 14 April 2026 (UTC)

Kim Shin-ji (Korean: 김신지) is a South Korean professional footballer who plays as a midfielder for Liga F club Deportivo Alavés Gloriosas, on loan from Serie A club AS Roma, and the South Korean women's national team.

== Youth career ==
Kim began playing football in an after-school club at her elementary school in Busan, where a P.E. teacher recognised her talent and suggested she transfer to a school with a girls' football programme. She transferred to Sangdae Elementary School in Pohang, and began attending national tournaments with the football team. She went on to play for Pohang Hangdo Middle School and then Pohang Girls' Electrical High School, where she was part of the winning team in the high school division at the Fall Women's Football Championship for three years in a row. After graduating from high school she played for Uiduk University.

== Club career ==
In February 2025, Kim joined Italian side AS Roma, signing a contract until June 2027. In August 2025, Kim was loaned to Rangers for the 2025–26 season. She made 23 appearances for the club across all competitions and was named in the PFA Scotland 2026 SWPL Team of the Year. In July 2026, Kim joined Spanish side Deportivo Alavés Gloriosas on a one-year loan deal.

== International career ==
Kim was called up to the South Korea U-17 team in 2019. She was part of the South Korea U-20 squad that came in third place at the 2024 AFC U-20 Women's Asian Cup and progressed to the round of 16 at the 2024 FIFA U-20 Women's World Cup. She received her first senior call up in late 2024. Kim played at the 2026 AFC Women's Asian Cup, scoring her debut international goal in South Korea's group stage match against Australia.

== Career statistics ==
=== Club ===
As of match played 23 February 2026

Appearances and goals by club, season and competition
Club	Season	League			National cup (Note: Includes Coppa Italia, Women's Scottish Cup)		League cup (Note: Includes SWPL Cup)		Continental		Total	
Club	Season	Division	Apps	Goals	Apps	Goals	Apps	Goals	Apps	Goals	Apps	Goals
AS Roma	2024–25	Serie A	1	0	1	0	—		0	0	2	0
Rangers (loan)	2025–26	SWPL	16	3	2	2	1	1	—		19	6
Career total			17	3	3	2	1	1	0	0	21	6

=== International ===
As of match played 14 April 2026

Appearances and goals by national team and year
National team	Year	Apps	Goals
South Korea	2024	2	0
South Korea	2025	10	0
South Korea	2026	7	2
Total		19	2

Scores and results list South Korea's goal tally first, score column indicates score after each Kim Shin-ji goal.

List of international goals scored by Kim Shin-ji
No.	Date	Venue	Opponent	Score	Result	Competition	Ref.
1	8 March 2026	Stadium Australia, Sydney, Australia	Australia	2–2	3–3	2026 Women's Asian Cup	
2	14 April 2026	Arena Pantanal, Cuiabá, Brazil	Canada	1–1	1–3	2026 FIFA Series	

== Honours ==
=== South Korea ===
- Pink Ladies Cup
  - Champions: 2025
- EAFF E-1 Football Championship
  - Champions: 2025

=== Individual ===
- 2026 PFA Scotland SWPL Team of the Year
