= Noh Jin-young =

South Korean footballer (born 2000)

Personal information
- Date of birth: June 3, 2000 (age 26)
- Height: 1.71 m (5 ft 7 in)
- Position: Defender

Team information
- Current team: Gyeongju KHNP
- Number: 21

Senior career*
Years	Team	Apps	(Gls)
2021	Sejong Sportstoto		
2022-2026	Mungyeong Sangmu		
2026-	Gyeongju KHNP		

International career^{‡}
2014	South Korea U-14	4	(4)
2019-2020	South Korea U-20	7	(1)
2024-	South Korea	10	(0)
- * Club domestic league appearances and goals ‡ National team caps and goals as of 04:30, 20 April 2026 (UTC)

Noh Jin-young (Korean: 노진영) is a South Korean professional footballer who plays for WK League side Gyeongju KHNP and the South Korean national team.

== Club career ==
Noh made her WK League debut in 2021, playing for Sejong Sportstoto. She underwent training at the Korea Military Academy in 2022 and was formally admitted to join military football team Mungyeong Sangmu in December of the same year. In October 2025 she reached the milestone of 100 WK League appearances. After leaving Sangmu and formally retiring from military service in April 2026, Noh signed with Gyeongju KHNP in June 2026.

== International career ==
Noh played for South Korea at youth level, including at the 2019 AFC U-19 Women's Championship, where she scored the first goal in the side's 9–1 win against Australia to finish in third place.

Noh received her first senior international call-up for South Korea in 2024 ahead of a pair of friendly matches against Japan. She was part of the South Korea squad that lifted the trophy at the 2025 EAFF E-1 Football Championship. Noh played for South Korea at the 2026 AFC Women's Asian Cup. The side reached the semi-finals to earn qualification for the 2027 FIFA Women's World Cup.

=== International goals ===
No.	Date	Venue	Opponent	Score	Result	Competition
1.	2 October 2026	Shizuoka Stadium, Fukuroi, Japan	China	1–0	1–0	2026 Asian Games

== Honours ==
=== Mungyeong Sangmu ===
- World Military Women's Football Championship
  - Champions: 2023

=== South Korea U-20 ===
- AFC U-19 Women's Championship
  - Third place: 2019

=== South Korea ===
- EAFF E-1 Football Championship
  - Champions: 2025
