= Mark Torcaso =

Australian association football coach

Personal information
- Full name: Mark Gabriele Torcaso
- Date of birth: 24 April 1981 (age 45)
- Place of birth: Australia

Managerial career
- Years: Team
- 2016–2021: Calder United
- 2022–2023: Western United Women
- 2023–: Philippines Women
- 2024: Philippines (assistant)

Mark Gabriele Torcaso is an Australian soccer coach who is the head coach of the Philippines women's national team. He was the inaugural coach of Western United in the A-League Women.

== Career ==
=== Coaching ===
==== Early Career and Western United ====
Torcaso's senior coaching career began in the National Premier Leagues Women's (NPLW), where he managed Calder United starting in 2016. In August 2021, he was appointed head coach of Western United's women's developmental squad. When the club joined the A-League Women for the 2022–23 season, Torcaso was named the inaugural head coach on 29 June 2022. In their debut season, he led the club to the Grand Final and was subsequently named the A-League Women Coach of the Year.

==== Philippines National Team ====
On 23 August 2023, the Philippine Football Federation (PFF) appointed Torcaso as the head coach of the women's national team, succeeding Alen Stajcic. While he initially coached both Western United and the Philippines concurrently, he resigned from his club role in December 2023 to commit fully to the national program, maintaining only an advisory role with Western United.

Under his leadership, the Philippines reached the quarter-finals in their debut appearance at the 2022 Asian Games and the second round of the 2024 AFC Women's Olympic Qualifying Tournament. In 2025, he guided the squad to a historic gold medal at the SEA Games in Thailand. In March 2026, Torcaso secured the Philippines' second consecutive FIFA Women's World Cup appearance to be held in 2027 in Brazil after a 2–0 victory over Uzbekistan in the 2026 AFC Women's Asian Cup.

=== Other Roles ===
Outside of professional club and international management, Torcaso has maintained a long-term commitment to youth development in Australia. Since the 2000s, he has served as the Director of Football at St Monica's College in Melbourne, overseeing the school's football programs and player pathways alongside his various professional appointments.
