= Mun Eun-ju =

South Korean footballer (born 2000)

Personal information
- Date of birth: 1 September 2000 (age 26)
- Height: 1.72 m (5 ft 8 in)
- Positions: Forward; attacking midfielder

Team information
- Current team: Hwacheon KSPO
- Number: 16

Senior career*
Years	Team	Apps	(Gls)
2021-	Hwacheon KSPO		

International career^{‡}
2015	South Korea U-17	3	(2)
2016-2017	South Korea U-20	5	(1)
2023-	South Korea	18	(6)
- * Club domestic league appearances and goals ‡ National team caps and goals as of 07:00, 16 April 2026 (UTC)

Mun Eun-ju (Korean: 문은주; born 1 September 2000) is a South Korean professional footballer who plays as a forward or attacking midfielder for WK League club Hwacheon KSPO and the South Korea national team.

== Club career ==
Mun was selected by Hwacheon KSPO as the first overall pick at the 2021 WK League new players draft. She was considered to be one of the league's most promising young players at the start of her second season with the club, and scored a hat-trick in Hwacheon's third round match against Changnyeong WFC.

Mun was named in the 2025 WK League Best XI at the annual WK League Awards, following a season in which she scored 12 goals, and Hwacheon won their first WK League title to complete a domestic treble. She missed the start of the 2026 WK League season due to an injury sustained while on international duty.

== International career ==
Mun made her senior international debut for South Korea in 2023, coming on as a substitute in the side's match against Myanmar at the 2022 Asian Games. She scored twice in her second A match appearance, a 5–0 victory over Hong Kong, a few days later. Mun played in all three of South Korea's matches on the way to lifting the trophy at the 2025 EAFF E-1 Football Championship.

She played in all of South Korea's matches at the 2026 AFC Women's Asian Cup, scoring twice during the group stage to help her side progress to the quarter-finals as group winners. Mun sustained an injury in the first half of the team's semi-final clash with Japan, and as a result she was absent from the national team squad for the 2026 FIFA Series.

== Career statistics ==
As of match played 18 March 2026

Appearances and goals by national team and year
National team	Year	Apps	Goals
South Korea	2023	3	2
South Korea	2024	1	0
South Korea	2025	9	2
South Korea	2026	5	2
Total		18	6

Scores and results list South Korea's goal tally first, score column indicates score after each Mun Eun-ju goal.

List of international goals scored by Mun Eun-ju
No.	Date	Venue	Opponent	Score	Result	Competition	Ref.
1	28 September 2023	Hangzhou Olympic Expo Center, Hangzhou, China	Hong Kong	3–0	5–0	2022 Asian Games	
2	28 September 2023	Hangzhou Olympic Expo Center, Hangzhou, China	Hong Kong	5–0	5–0	2022 Asian Games	
3	23 February 2025	Al Hamriya Sports Club Stadium, Al Hamriyah, United Arab Emirates	Thailand	4–0	4–0	2025 Pink Ladies Cup	
4	26 February 2025	Al Hamriya Sports Club Stadium, Al Hamriyah, United Arab Emirates	India	3–0	3–0	2025 Pink Ladies Cup	
5	5 March 2026	Gold Coast Stadium, Gold Coast, Australia	Philippines	3–0	3–0	2026 AFC Women's Asian Cup	
6	8 March 2026	Stadium Australia, Sydney, Australia	Australia	1–0	3–3	2026 AFC Women's Asian Cup	

== Honours ==
Hwacheon KSPO

- WK League
  - Champions: 2025
  - Runners-up: 2024
- National Women's Football Championship
  - Champions: 2025
- National Sports Festival
  - Champions: 2025

South Korea

- Pink Ladies Cup
  - Champions: 2025
- EAFF E-1 Football Championship
  - Champions: 2025

Individual

- WK League Awards Best XI: 2025
