= Alex Carpio =

Filipino footballer (born 2002)

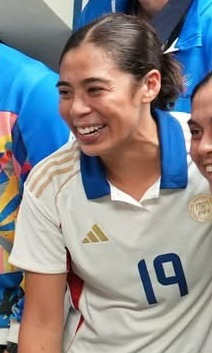
- Carpio in 2025

Personal information
- Full name: Alessandrea Casimere Carpio
- Date of birth: March 4, 2002 (age 24)
- Place of birth: Queens, New York, U.S.
- Height: 5 ft 5 in (1.64 m)
- Positions: Forward; attacking midfielder

Team information
- Current team: Kaya–Iloilo
- Number: 30

Youth career
- Moreau Catholic Mariners

College career
Years	Team	Apps	(Gls)
2022–2024	San Francisco Dons	52	(5)

Senior career*
Years	Team	Apps	(Gls)
2021	San Ramon FC		
2022–2023	San Francisco Nighthawks		(5)
2024	Oakland Soul	8	(0)
2025–	Kaya–Iloilo	0	(0)

International career^{‡}
2024–	Philippines	16	(0)
Medal record
Women's football
Representing the Philippines
Southeast Asian Games
Gold medal – first place	2025 Thailand	Team
- * Club domestic league appearances and goals as of June 14, 2025 ‡ National team caps and goals as of September 25, 2026

Alessandrea Casimere Carpio (born March 4, 2002) is a professional footballer who plays as a forward or midfielder for PFF Women's League club Kaya–Iloilo. Born in the United States, she represents the Philippines at international level.

== Early life ==
Alex Carpio grew up in Union City, California, and attended Moreau Catholic High School, where she played high school soccer.

== College career ==
Carpio began her collegiate career at the University of San Francisco in 2022. As a junior, she played in all 19 matches, scoring her first collegiate goal in a 1–1 draw against California on September 1. She also recorded an assist in a win over UC Davis.

In 2023, she appeared in all 18 games and made eight starts. She scored four goals during the season, including a brace against UC Riverside and a goal and an assist in a win over Santa Clara. In 2024, as a graduate student, Carpio made 15 appearances with eight starts.

== Club career ==
In 2021, Carpio joined San Ramon FC in the Women's Premier Soccer League.

In 2022, she played for the San Francisco Nighthawks in the WPSL. She scored her first goal for the club in a 3–2 win over Napa Valley on May 22, 2022. Over the 2022 and 2023 WPSL seasons, she tallied five goals and one assist.

In 2024, Carpio played for Oakland Soul SC in the USL W League, where she made eight appearances during the season.

Carpio played for Kaya–Iloilo of the PFF Women's League. In the 2026 season, she helped her team win their third consecutive title. She was also named the Most Valuable Player of the season.

== International career ==
Carpio received her first call-up to the Philippines women's national football team on March 31, 2025, for a pair of friendlies against South Korea. She made her international debut on April 8, 2025, coming on as a substitute in a 2–1 loss to South Korea.

== Career statistics ==
=== International ===
As of match played September 25, 2026

Appearances and goals by national team and year
National team	Year	Apps	Goals
Philippines	2024	3	0
Philippines	2025	6	0
Philippines	2026	7	0
Total		16	0

== Honors ==
Kaya–Iloilo

- PFF Women's League: 2026

Philippines

- Southeast Asian Games: 2025

Individual

- PFF Women's League Most Valuable Player: 2026
