= Mary Fowler =

Australian football player (born 2003)

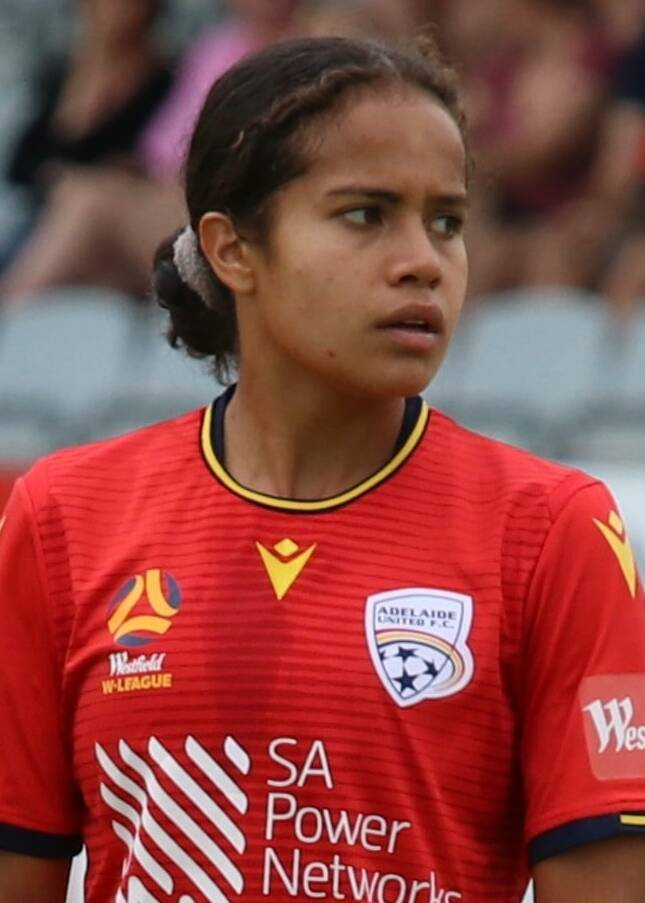
- Fowler with Adelaide United in 2019

Personal information
- Full name: Mary Boio Fowler
- Date of birth: 14 February 2003 (age 23)
- Place of birth: Cairns, Queensland, Australia
- Height: 1.72 m (5 ft 8 in)
- Positions: Forward; midfielder

Team information
- Current team: Manchester City
- Number: 8

Youth career
- Saints FC
- Leichhardt FC
- BVV Barendrecht
- ESA

Senior career*
Years	Team	Apps	(Gls)
2019	Illawarra Stingrays	9	(3)
2019	Bankstown City	4	(3)
2019–2020	Adelaide United	7	(3)
2020–2022	Montpellier	40	(10)
2022–	Manchester City	65	(13)

International career^{‡}
2018–2019	Australia U20	10	(17)
2018–	Australia	71	(17)
- * Club domestic league appearances and goals as of 22:00, 22 November 2026 (UTC) ‡ National team caps and goals as of 19:35, 6 September 2026 (UTC)

Mary Boio Fowler (Tok Pisin: [bojo] BOY-oh; born 14 February 2003) is an Australian professional soccer player who plays for English Women's Super League club Manchester City and the Australia national team. Mainly a forward, she is also able to play as a midfielder.

== Early life and education ==
Mary Boio Fowler was born on 14 February 2003 in Cairns, Queensland, the third of five children. Fowler's father, Kevin, is from Dublin, Ireland. Her mother, Nido, is from Kira Kira, a village within greater Port Moresby, Papua New Guinea, where the couple met.

As a young child, Fowler attended Holy Cross Primary School in Cairns. Her favourite school subject was maths. Her parents chose not to have a television set at home, and so she and her siblings engaged in other forms of entertainment, such as kicking a football around at Trinity Beach near Cairns after school. As a child, Fowler was interested in drawing, writing poetry, dressing up and acting in little shows with her siblings, and enjoyed being creative.

Fowler began playing football at the age of seven. While still at school, she was a member of boys teams for Saints FC as well as Leichhardt FC in the local Cairns league. She was selected to play for the Queensland state under-12s team at 10 years of age. A year later, she moved with her family to the Netherlands where they lived for three years, during which she was signed to BVV Barendrecht and learnt to speak Dutch fluently.

At age 14, Fowler returned to Australia with her family and began attending Wollongong High School of the Performing Arts. Later, she played for Bankstown City in the NSW Women's National Premier League. In 2019, aged 16 years, Fowler signed her first professional contract with Adelaide United and relocated to South Australia to begin her football career.

== Club career ==
=== Adelaide United ===
Fowler made her W-League debut for Adelaide United in the first game of the 2019–20 season. She scored her first goal in that game in a 2–1 loss against Western Sydney Wanderers.

=== Montpellier ===
In February 2020, on the day of her 17th birthday, Fowler signed for French Ligue 1 club Montpellier HSC on a three-year contract, arranged by her father, after an undisclosed transfer fee was paid. She moved to Montpelier and made her debut against Olympique Lyonnais in February 2020.

She was named to ESPN's 21 under 21, an international list of footballers representing the next generation of talent, in May 2021.

In her book, Bloom, published in 2025, Fowler wrote that she had self-harmed, had suicidal thoughts, and had also seriously contemplated quitting football, during her time with Montpellier. She had planned her retirement in detail, even drawing up a budget for living in a renovated van back in Australia and working as an online personal trainer. "I wasn't even 20 years old, so if I wanted to jump into a whole new career, time was on my side. There were options aplenty," she later wrote in her book.

Fowler also claimed that she and her friend Ashleigh Weerden had been treated differently from their teammates throughout her second year at Montpellier. In particular, she wrote that after she, Weerden, and several of their foreign teammates had played their final game for the club, the foreign teammates had been presented with flowers, but that the two friends had not been mentioned. In the changing room afterwards, "... [a] few of the girls laughed about it and then one of the other players came over and handed my friend and me some bananas, saying, ‘here have these’..." Fowler suggested that this was racially-motivated, saying "it was hard to see it as merely a simple error" given her and Weerden were "two of only six black girls in the squad." Montpellier denied the accusation of racism and said the club had found no evidence to back up Fowler's assertions.

Shortly after leaving Montpellier, Fowler asked to be exempted from attending a national training camp. "After a challenging season, I was exhausted," she later wrote. National team officials told her that she needed a psychologist to declare her medically unfit to attend the camp, and she obtained such a ruling within five minutes of a session she felt was beneficial to her.

=== Manchester City ===
In June 2022, Fowler signed a four-year contract with English FA WSL club Manchester City. On 26 October 2022, she scored her first goal for the club, a penalty, in a 6-0 win over Blackburn Rovers before scoring her second of the match 29 minutes later.

During her first season at Manchester City, Fowler spent much time on the substitutes' bench, and her mental health struggles reached their highest point. On the other hand, she felt that joining Manchester City had been "a step up", and that her football awareness had progressed under the influence of the team's players, staff and facilities. "Your faults are far more apparent here because you’re at a much higher level and the players around you demand so much more," she told The Observer in April 2023.

Later in the year, Fowler was nominated for The Best FIFA Women's Player and The European Golden Girl Award after a positive season for both Manchester City and Australia. Her second year with Manchester City resulted in more game time with her regularly joining the starting line-up. She scored the first two goals in her team's 4-0 victory over Bristol City in April 2024.

On 13 April 2025, Fowler acquired an anterior cruciate ligament (ACL) injury during Manchester City's FA Cup semi-final game against Manchester United. She signed a new contract with Manchester City on 1 October 2025, until mid-2027. On 1 February 2026, Fowler made her return to the pitch following her recovery from the ACL injury, in their 5-1 victory over Chelsea, coming on as a substitute in the 75th minute.

== International career ==
=== Young Matildas ===
Fowler, aged 15, was named by Australia under-20s (Young Matildas) head coach Leah Blayney to the 23-player squad on 20 June 2018 for the AFF Women's Championship, which was held in Indonesia. The Young Matildas competed against senior teams from the ASEAN region. Fowler was the tournament's highest goal scorer (Golden Boot) with ten goals, which included five against Cambodia in a group stage game and two goals in their 3–2 loss in the final against Thailand, to become runners-up.

=== 2018 Tournament of Nations ===
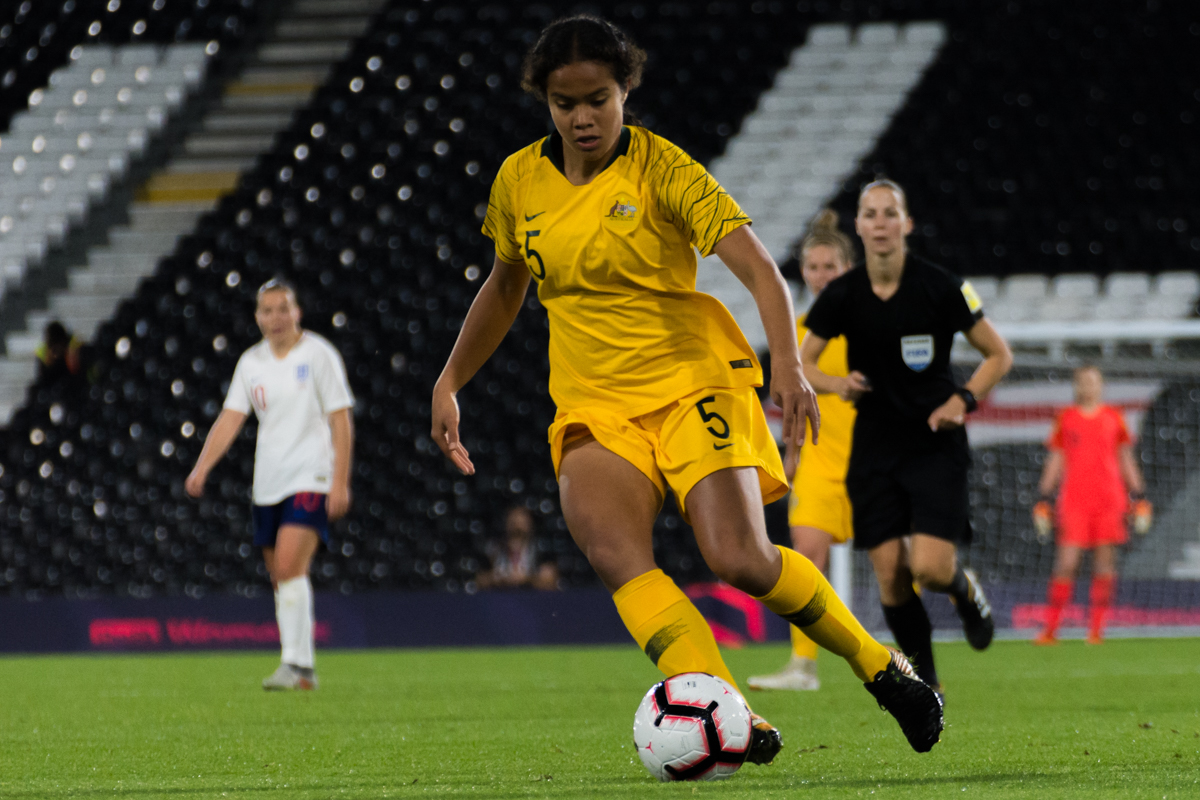
Fowler playing for Australia in the 2018 friendly against England

As a teenager, Fowler resisted attempts by the Football Association of Ireland to poach her from Football Australia's youth system. In 2018, she was added to the Australian squad for the Tournament of Nations. She made her debut late in the game against Brazil, thus becoming the fifth youngest player for the Matildas at 15 years and 162 days.

At that early stage in her international career, Fowler received wide praise for her abilities as a player, with coach Alen Stajcic saying that she has "probably got the most weapons I've seen from a young player her age in women's football".

Fowler was again used as a substitute in Australia's friendlies against England and France later in the year, but was unavailable for the matches against Chile to attend trials with the first teams of Chelsea, West Ham and Manchester City, who all wanted to sign her. She also attended sprint and power training sessions in Manchester with coach Mick Clegg.

=== 2019 FIFA Women's World Cup ===
Fowler was called up to the Australian squad for the 2019 FIFA Women's World Cup. At the age of 16, she was the squad's youngest player, and the event was an important learning experience for her. However, a hamstring injury prevented her from making a World Cup debut before her team was eliminated from the tournament in its first knockout match.

=== 2020 Summer Olympics ===
Fowler was selected to the Australian squad for the 2020 Summer Olympics. She made her Olympic debut as a substitute in a Group G match against New Zealand. The Matildas advanced to the quarter-finals with one victory and a draw in the group stage. In the quarter-finals against Great Britain, which ended in a 4–3 win for Australia after extra time, Fowler scored a goal in the 104th minute. However, they lost 1–0 to Sweden in the semi-finals and lost 4–3 in the bronze medal match to the United States.

=== 2023 FIFA Women's World Cup ===
Fowler was selected as part of the Matildas squad for the 2023 FIFA Women's World Cup, and became instrumental in the team after squad captain Sam Kerr was ruled out for at least the first two games due to injury. She had scored the winning goal in a friendly against France in the week preceding the beginning of the tournament, in front of a record crowd.

She was ruled out of Australia's second match against Nigeria on 27 July due to concussion.

On 31 July, Fowler scored her first World Cup goal for Australia, against Canada in Melbourne in what was a 4–0 win.

On 7 August in the Round of 16 game against Denmark, Fowler's pin-point assist pass to Caitlin Foord set up the first goal for Australia to take the score to 1–0. Australia later won the match 2–0. On 12 August, during Australia's quarter final defeat of France in what was Fowler's first ever competitive penalty shoot-out, she took, and succeeded with, her team's fourth penalty shot.

=== 2024 Summer Olympics ===
On 4 June 2024, Fowler was named in the Matildas team which qualified for the Paris 2024 Olympics, her second Olympic games selection.

== Media commentary ==
Fowler is regarded by many commentors and journalists as one of the best young talents in women's soccer, and is known for her creativity on the ball.

== Endorsements and recognition ==
Ahead of the 2023 World Cup, Fowler was engaged as one of the Australian faces of Adidas, and as a brand ambassador for Rebel Sport, a sporting goods retailer. In December 2023, she became a brand ambassador for Rise & Shine, a childcare provider.

In May 2024, Mattel announced the manufacture of a new Barbie doll in Fowler's likeness, along with that of seven other athletes, including Venus Williams.

== Personal life ==
Fowler began her professional career together with her older sister Ciara when they were both signed by Adelaide United in the same year. They played together professionally for the first time in the first match of the 2019–20 season when Ciara came on as an 85th-minute substitute. This was the debut for both sisters. Fowler likes connecting with her heritage and ethnic roots, both New Guinean and Irish. During the 2023 World Cup, her mother's home village hung up banners in Fowler's honour and held viewing parties for her matches.

Since August 2023 and as of November 2025, Fowler has been in a relationship with Australian rugby league player Nathan Cleary, after meeting several months earlier at an Adidas event in Sydney. They had their first date on the morning of Australia's first game in the 2023 World Cup, and continued to meet during the tournament.

Fowler enjoys travelling and learning languages. Although she enjoyed living in Montpellier, she became homesick during the COVID-19 pandemic. She had learned Dutch at school in the Netherlands, but found learning French challenging. She still enjoys painting, drawing, and writing.

Fowler's memoir, Bloom, was published in November 2025.

== Career statistics ==
=== Club ===
As of match played 22 November 2026

Appearances and goals by club, season and competition
Club	Season	League			National cup (Note: includes Coupe de France, Women's FA Cup)		League cup (Note: includes Women's League Cup)		Continental (Note: includes UEFA Women's Champions League)		Total	
Club	Season	Division	Apps	Goals	Apps	Goals	Apps	Goals	Apps	Goals	Apps	Goals
Adelaide United	2019–20	W-League	7	3	—		—		—		7	3
Montpellier HSC	2019–20	D1 Féminine	1	0	0	0	—		—		1	0
Montpellier HSC	2020–21	D1 Féminine	22	5	1	0	—		—		23	5
Montpellier HSC	2021–22	D1 Féminine	17	5	1	0	—		—		18	5
Montpellier HSC	Total		40	10	2	0	—		—		42	10
Manchester City	2022–23	Women's Super League	11	1	3	0	6	4	2	0	22	5
Manchester City	2023–24	Women's Super League	21	4	3	2	6	0	—		30	6
Manchester City	2024–25	Women's Super League	17	6	4	0	3	2	10	2	34	10
Manchester City	2025–26	Women's Super League	5	0	4	1	0	0	—		9	1
Manchester City	2026–27	Women's Super League	11	2	0	0	—		5	0	16	2
Manchester City	Total		65	13	14	3	15	6	17	2	111	24
Career total			112	26	16	3	15	6	17	2	160	37

=== International ===
As of match played 9 June 2026

Appearances and goals by national team and year
National Team	Year	Apps	Goals
Australia	2018	3	0
Australia	2019	1	0
Australia	2020	0	0
Australia	2021	16	5
Australia	2022	12	4
Australia	2023	16	4
Australia	2024	11	2
Australia	2025	5	1
Australia	2026	8	1
Total		71	17

Scores and results list Australia's goal tally first, score column indicates score after each Fowler goal.

List of international goals scored by Mary Fowler
No.	Date	Venue	Opponent	Score	Result	Competition	Ref.
1	10 June 2021	CASA Arena, Horsens, Denmark	Denmark	1–3	2–3	Friendly	
2	30 July 2021	Kashima Soccer Stadium, Kashima, Japan	Great Britain	3–2	4–3	2020 Summer Olympics	
3	21 September 2021	Tallaght Stadium, Dublin, Ireland	Republic of Ireland	1–1	2–3	Friendly	
4	21 September 2021	Tallaght Stadium, Dublin, Ireland	Republic of Ireland	2–2	2–3	Friendly	
5	23 October 2021	Western Sydney Stadium, Sydney, Australia	Brazil	2–0	3–1	Friendly	
6	21 January 2022	Mumbai Football Arena, Mumbai, India	Indonesia	4–0	18–0	2022 AFC Women's Asian Cup	
7	24 January 2022	Mumbai Football Arena, Mumbai, India	Philippines	4–0	4–0	2022 AFC Women's Asian Cup	
8	6 September 2022	Sydney Football Stadium, Sydney, Australia	Canada	1–0	1–2	Friendly	
9	12 November 2022	AAMI Park, Melbourne, Australia	Sweden	3–0	4–0	Friendly	
10	14 July 2023	Docklands Stadium, Melbourne, Australia	France	1–0	1–0	Friendly	
11	31 July 2023	Melbourne Rectangular Stadium, Melbourne, Australia	Canada	3–0	4–0	2023 FIFA Women's World Cup	
12	29 October 2023	Perth Stadium, Perth, Australia	Philippines	1–0	8–0	2024 AFC Women's Olympic Qualifying Tournament	
13	1 November 2023	Perth Rectangular Stadium, Perth, Australia	Chinese Taipei	1–0	3–0	2024 AFC Women's Olympic Qualifying Tournament	
14	24 February 2024	Milliy Stadium, Tashkent, Uzbekistan	Uzbekistan	2–0	3–0	2024 AFC Women's Olympic Qualifying Tournament	
15	28 February 2024	Marvel Stadium, Melbourne, Australia	Uzbekistan	6–0	10–0	2024 AFC Women's Olympic Qualifying Tournament	
16	7 April 2025	McDonald Jones Stadium, Newcastle, Australia	South Korea	1–0	2–0	Friendly	
17	5 March 2026	Gold Coast Stadium, Gold Coast, Australia	Iran	2–0	4–0	2026 Women's Asian Cup	

== Honours ==
Manchester City

- Women's Super League: 2025–26
- Women's FA Cup: 2025–26

Australia

- AFF Women's Championship: Runners-up: 2018 (Australia U20)

Individual

- 2018 AFF Women's Championship: Golden Boot
- PFA Australian Young Women's Footballer of the Year: 2022, 2024
- PFA WSL Team of the Year: 2024–25

== Bibliography ==
- Fowler, Mary; Gullan, Scott (2025), Bloom: Creating a life I love, Southbank, Vic: Penguin Random House Australia, ISBN 978-1-76135-590-5
