= Jeon Yu-gyeong =

South Korean footballer (born 2004)

Personal information
- Date of birth: 20 January 2004 (age 22)
- Place of birth: South Korea
- Height: 1.70 m (5 ft 7 in)
- Position: Forward

Team information
- Current team: Molde
- Number: 9

Youth career
- 2017–2019: Pohang Hangdo Middle School
- 2020–2022: Pohang Girls' Electronic High School

College career
Years	Team	Apps	(Gls)
2023–2025	Uiduk University		

Senior career*
Years	Team	Apps	(Gls)
2025–	Molde	11	(8)

International career
	South Korea	2	(0)
- * Club domestic league appearances and goals as of 22 June 2025

Jeon Yu-gyeong (Korean: 전유경; born 20 January 2004) is a South Korean footballer who plays as a forward for Molde.

== Early life ==
Jeon was born on 20 January 2004 in South Korea. Growing up, she attended Sangdae Elementary School, Pohang Hangdo Middle School, and Pohang Girls' Electronic High School. Subsequently, she attended Uiduk University.

== Club career ==
Jeon started her career with Norwegian side Molde. On 23 March 2025, she debuted and scored her first goal for the club during a 3–1 home win over Arna-Bjørnar in the league. On 26 December 2025, Molde announced that they had signed a new two-year contract with Jeon.

== International career ==
Jeon is a South Korea international. During the summer of 2022, she played for the South Korea women's national under-20 football team at the 2022 FIFA U-20 Women's World Cup.

== Career statistics ==
=== International ===
Scores and results list South Korea's goal tally first, score column indicates score after each Yu-gyeong goal.

List of international goals scored by Jeon Yu-gyeong
No.	Date	Venue	Opponent	Score	Result	Competition
1	5 March 2026	Gold Coast Stadium, Gold Coast, Australia	Philippines	1–0	3–0	2026 Women's Asian Cup

== Style of play ==
Jeon plays as a forward. South Korean newspaper The Chosun Ilbo wrote in 2025 that she is a "striker resource with a height of 170cm, quick feet, back-to-back play, bold shooting, and a fighting spirit and activity level that doesn't spare her body".
