= Uiduk University =

University in Gyeongju, South Korea

Coordinates: 36.0128°N 129.2831°E

Uiduk University (Korean: 위덕대학교; Hanja: 威德大學校) is a private university located in Gyeongju, North Gyeongsang Province, South Korea.

== See also ==
- List of colleges and universities in South Korea
- Education in South Korea
