= Shin Sang-woo (footballer) =

South Korean footballer

Personal information
- Date of birth: March 10, 1976 (age 50)
- Place of birth: South Korea
- Height: 1.76 m (5 ft 9 in)
- Position: Defender

Youth career
- 1992–1994: Kwangwoon Electronics Technical High School
- 1995–1998: Kwangwoon University

Senior career*
Years	Team	Apps	(Gls)
1999–2004	Daejeon Citizen	83	(6)
2002–2003	→ Gwangju Sangmu (army)		
2005–2006	Seongnam Ilhwa	1	(0)
2008	Incheon United	0	(0)
2009–2011	Gimhae City	0	(0)

Managerial career
- 2010–2014: Gimhae FC (assistant)
- 2015–2016: Boeun Sangmu (assistant)
- 2017: Icheon Daekyo
- 2018–2021: Changnyeong WFC
- 2022–2024: Gimcheon Sangmu (assistant)
- 2024–: South Korea Women
- * Club domestic league appearances and goals

Shin Sang-woo (Korean: 신상우; Hanja: 申相又; born March 10, 1976) is a South Korean football manager and former player. He is currently the manager of the South Korea women's national football team.

== Playing career ==
During his playing career, Shin played for Daejeon Citizen, Gwangju Sangmu, Seongnam Ilhwa, Incheon United and Gimhae City FC.

== Managerial career ==
Shin's first coaching appointment was at Gimhae FC from 2010-2014, from where he moved to serve as an assistant coach at the military team Boeun Sangmu. He took charge of the WK League team Icheon Daekyo in 2017, before being appointed as the first manager of new club Changnyeong WFC ahead of the 2018 season. After three seasons at Changnyeong, Shin moved to become an assistant coach at the K League 1 side Gimcheon Sangmu. In 2024, the Korea Football Association appointed Shin manager of the women's national football team, contracting his services until the 2028 Los Angeles Olympics.
