= South Korea women's national under-20 football team =

Korea Republic U-20
- Nickname(s): Taegeuk Nangja (Taegeuk Ladies)
- Association: Korea Football Association
- Confederation: AFC (Asia)
- Sub-confederation: EAFF (East Asia)
- Head coach: Park Youn-jeong
- FIFA code: KOR
First colours	Second colours

FIFA U-20 Women's World Cup
- Appearances: 7 (first in 2004)
- Best result: Third place (2010)

AFC U-20 Women's Asian Cup
- Appearances: 11 (first in 2002)
- Best result: Champions (2004, 2013)

The South Korea women's national under-20 football team (recognized as Korea Republic by FIFA) represents South Korea in women's international youth football competitions.

== Team image ==
=== Nicknames ===
The South Korea women's national under-20 football team has been known or nicknamed as the "Taegeuk Nangja (Taegeuk Ladies)".

== Results and fixtures ==
Win Draw Lose Fixture

== Coaching staff ==
Current coaching staff
Position	Name
Team manager	(South Korea) Hwang In-soo
Coach	(South Korea) Go Hyeon-bok
Coach	(South Korea) Park Youn-jeong
Goalkeeping coach	(South Korea) Cho Min
Fitness coach	(South Korea) Su Hwang-bo

== Players ==
=== Current squad ===
The following 21 players represented South Korea on the 2024 FIFA U-20 Women's World Cup, held in Colombia in August 2024.

No.	Pos.	Player	Date of birth (age)	Caps	Goals	Club
1	GK	Woo Seo-bin	13 April 2004 (aged 20)			(Korea Football Association) Uiduk University
2	DF	Jung You-jin	10 October 2005 (aged 18)			(Korea Football Association) Uiduk University
3	DF	Yang Da-min	18 September 2005 (aged 18)			(Korea Football Association) Ulsan College
4	DF	Eom Min-kyoung	24 November 2004 (aged 19)			(Korea Football Association) Uiduk University
5	DF	Nam Seung-eun	10 January 2006 (aged 18)			(Korea Football Association) Osan Information High School
6	MF	Kim Shin-ji	3 May 2004 (aged 20)			(Korea Football Association) Uiduk University
7	FW	Jeon Yu-gyeong (captain)	20 January 2004 (aged 20)			(Korea Football Association) Uiduk University
8	MF	Kim Ji-hyeon	27 July 2004 (aged 20)			(Korea Football Association) Daedeok University
9	FW	Park Soo-jeong	3 November 2004 (aged 19)			(Korea Football Association) Ulsan College
10	MF	Bae Ye-bin	7 December 2004 (aged 19)			(Korea Football Association) Uiduk University
11	FW	Cho Hye-young	18 February 2006 (aged 18)			(Korea Football Association) Gwangyang Girls' High School
12	GK	Cho Eo-jin	20 March 2005 (aged 19)			(Korea Football Association) Ulsan College
13	MF	Choi Han-bin	2 March 2004 (aged 20)			(Korea Football Association) Korea University
14	FW	Cheon Se-hwa	11 November 2004 (aged 19)			(Korea Football Association) Ulsan College
15	DF	Choi Eun-hyoung	25 May 2005 (aged 19)			(Korea Football Association) Korea University
16	DF	Kim Kyu-yeon	23 June 2005 (aged 19)			(Korea Football Association) Ulsan College
17	MF	Hong Chae-bin	11 February 2004 (aged 20)			(Korea Football Association) Korea University
18	MF	Kang Eun-young	5 December 2004 (aged 19)			(Korea Football Association) Daedeok University
19	FW	Jeong Da-bin	5 September 2005 (aged 18)			(Korea Football Association) Korea University
20	DF	Chang Seo-yoon	30 October 2004 (aged 19)			(United States Soccer Federation) Yale Bulldogs
21	GK	Jeong Da-hee	13 November 2006 (aged 17)			(Korea Football Association) Chungnam Internet High School

(Players are listed within position group by order of seniority, kit number, caps, goals, and then alphabetically)

== Competitive record ==
Champions Runners-up Third place

=== FIFA U-20 Women's World Cup ===
FIFA U-20 Women's World Cup record
Year	Round	Pld	W	D	L	GF	GA	Squad
(Canada) 2002	Did not qualify							
(Thailand) 2004	Group stage	3	1	0	2	3	5	Squad
(Russia) 2006	Did not qualify							
(Chile) 2008	Did not qualify							
(Germany) 2010	Third place	6	4	0	2	13	9	Squad
(Japan) 2012	Quarter-finals	4	2	0	2	5	5	Squad
(Canada) 2014	Quarter-finals	4	1	2	1	4	4	Squad
(Papua New Guinea) 2016	Group stage	3	1	0	2	3	4	Squad
(France) 2018	Did not qualify							
(Costa Rica) 2022	Group stage	3	1	0	2	2	2	Squad
(Colombia) 2024	Round of 16	4	1	1	2	1	2	Squad
(Poland) 2026	Quarter-finals	5	2	1	2	7	9	Squad
Total:8/12	Third place	32	13	4	15	38	40	-

=== AFC U-20 Women's Asian Cup ===
AFC U-20 Women's Asian Cup record								Qualification record					
Year	Round	Pld	W	D	L	GF	GA	Pld	W	D	L	GF	GA
(India) 2002	Group stage	3	2	0	1	17	7	Not held					
(China) 2004	Champions	6	6	0	0	24	3	Not held					
(Malaysia) 2006	Group stage	3	1	0	2	13	4	Directly qualified					
(China) 2007	Fourth place	5	2	2	1	10	3	Directly qualified					
(China) 2009	Runners-up	5	3	0	2	10	5	5	5	0	0	66	0
(Vietnam) 2011	Fourth place	5	2	1	2	11	9	Directly qualified					
(China) 2013	Champions	5	4	1	0	15	4	Directly qualified					
(China) 2015	Third place	5	3	0	2	20	2	Directly qualified					
(China) 2017	Group stage	3	1	0	2	5	4	Directly qualified					
(Thailand) 2019	Third place	5	3	0	2	13	7	6	6	0	0	27	1
(Uzbekistan) 2024	Fourth place	5	2	0	3	20	6	Directly qualified					
(Thailand) 2026	Semi-finals	5	3	0	2	6	10	3	3	0	0	16	1
Total	2 titles	55	32	4	19	164	64	14	14	0	0	109	2

== Head-to-head record ==
The following table shows South Korea's head-to-head record in the FIFA U-20 Women's World Cup.

Opponent	Pld	W	D	L	GF	GA	GD	Win %
Argentina	1	1	0	0	1	0	+1	100.00
Brazil	1	1	0	0	2	0	+2	100.00
Canada	1	1	0	0	2	0	+2	100.00
Colombia	2	1	0	1	1	1	+0	50.00
Ecuador	1	1	0	0	3	2	+1	100.00
England	1	0	1	0	1	1	+0	0.00
France	3	0	2	1	1	2	−1	0.00
Germany	3	1	0	2	2	7	−5	33.33
Ghana	2	1	0	1	5	5	+0	50.00
Italy	1	1	0	0	2	0	+2	100.00
Japan	1	0	0	1	1	3	−2	0.00
Mexico	3	2	0	1	5	4	+1	66.67
Nigeria	4	0	0	4	1	6	−5	0.00
Russia	1	1	0	0	2	0	+2	100.00
Spain	1	0	0	1	1	2	−1	0.00
Switzerland	1	1	0	0	4	0	+4	100.00
United States	2	0	0	2	0	4	−4	0.00
Venezuela	2	1	1	0	3	0	+3	50.00
Total	31	13	4	14	37	37	+0	41.94

== See also ==
- Football in South Korea
- South Korea women's national football team
- South Korea women's national under-17 football team
- South Korea national under-20 football team
