= NRL regular season =

Regular season of the Australian National Rugby League

The National Rugby League (NRL) regular season usually begins in the first week of March, finishing in the first weekend of September before the finals series. Generally, there are 204 games played over 27 rounds, with each of the 17 teams playing 24 matches each. Since 2017, the schedule has generally featured one Thursday night game (7:55pm (all times AEDT/AEST)), two Friday games (6:00pm and 7:55pm), three Saturday games (3:00pm, 5:30pm and 7:35pm) and two Sunday games (2:00pm, 4:05pm and/or 6:30pm). In addition to these regularly scheduled games, there are occasionally games at other times, such as Easter Weekend, ANZAC Day and the King's Birthday.

Also in place are TV agreements as to who shows these games. All matches are shown live on Fox League and the Thursday night, Friday night and Sunday afternoon (4:05pm) are simulcast with Channel 9. Channel 9 also show the Good Friday and ANZAC Day games on top of the usual matches.

Each team plays half of their matches at home and half away, playing eight teams just once and eight teams twice. Who each team plays, when and where is mainly determined on club requests as to which matchups attracts the best crowds and television ratings.

The winning team at the end of the regular season is crowned the minor premier, and has received the J. J. Giltinan Shield since 1997.

== Game times ==
Matches, as of 2024, are played as follows (all times AEDT/AEST):

- Thursday night: 7:50 pm
- Friday evening: 6:00 pm
- Friday night: 8:00 pm
- Saturday afternoon: 3:00 pm
- Saturday evening: 5:30 pm
- Saturday night: 7:35 pm
- Sunday afternoon: 2:00 pm (only during AEST)
- Sunday afternoon: 4:05 pm
- Sunday evening: 6:15 pm (only during AEDT)

This can be shown above al

On ANZAC Day, two matches are played:

- St. George Illawarra Dragons vs Sydney Roosters: 4:05pm (Sydney Football Stadium)
- Melbourne Storm vs South Sydney Rabbitohs: 7:50pm (Melbourne Rectangular Stadium)

On Easter Weekend:

- Good Friday — the 6pm match is moved to 4:05pm, where the South Sydney Rabbitohs play the Canterbury-Bankstown Bulldogs in the annual Good Friday Game
- Easter Monday — the Parramatta Eels play the Wests Tigers at 4:05pm in the annual Easter Monday Game

On the King's Birthday holiday, the Canterbury-Bankstown Bulldogs play the Parramatta Eels at 4:00pm in the King's Birthday match.

== History ==
Number of regular season games per team
| 1908 | 9 games |
| 1909 | 10 games |
| 1910–1919, 1930–1934, 1938–1946 | 14 games |
| 1920, 1936 | 13–14 games (varies) |
| 1921, 1924, 1937 | 8 games |
| 1922 | 15–16 games (varies) |
| 1923, 1926–1927, 1929, 1935 | 16 games |
| 1925 | 11–12 games (varies) |
| 1928 | 12–13 games (varies) |
| 1947–1966, 1997 (SL) | 18 games |
| 1967–1981, 1988–1995, 1997 (ARL) | 22 games |
| 1982–1983, 2000–2001 | 26 games |
| 1984–1987, 1998–1999, 2002–2019, 2021– | 24 games |
| 1996 | 21–22 games (varies) |
| 2020 | 20 games (COVID-19 pandemic) |

The 1908 NSWRFL season featured ten rounds, with each of the nine teams playing nine games each, playing one team twice in the process. The following season, due to the loss of Cumberland, the eight teams played ten rounds, playing ten games in the process (six teams once, two teams twice). The following ten years saw each team play fourteen matches, playing each team in the competition twice. The next eighteen years saw a lot of change in the number of matches played, including years where some teams played a match more than others. In 1938, consistency was again found, where each team played each other team twice, constituting into a 14-round, 14-game season. In 1947, with the additions of Manly Warringah and Parramatta, the number of teams was brought up to ten, meaning that the number of matches was brought up to 18. In 1967, the NSWRL again expanded at the same rate, with Cronulla-Sutherland and Penrith being introduced, making the league a 12 team contest. The same seasonal structure remained, with each team playing each other twice. In 1982, with the additions of the Canberra Raiders and the Illawarra Steelers, the number of teams was brought up to fourteen, increasing the number of games to 26. In 1984, with the loss of the Newtown Jets, one team had a bye each week, however there were still 26 rounds, only with 24 games for each team. In 1988, three teams were added (Brisbane Broncos, Gold Coast-Tweed Giants, Newcastle Knights), leading to the NSWRL changing up the draw formula, with teams playing seven teams twice and eight teams just once in the new 22-game season. In the 1996 ARL season, due to the emergence of the Super League war, teams aligned with the Super League refused to take part in the first week, leading to an unbalanced match count, with twelve teams having 21 games and eight teams having 22. In 1997, the 12 team ARL had each team play each other twice, leading to a 22-game season. The 10 team Super League went with the same style, ending up with an 18-game season. After the two leagues reunified into the National Rugby League, the 1998 NRL season saw the 20 teams play 24 matches, playing five teams twice whilst coming up against the other 14 sides once. The next season, the competition cut to 17 teams, meaning one team had a bye each week. The teams still played 24 matches though, playing more teams twice. In the 2000 season, when the competition again cut to 14, the season expanded the season size so every team played each other twice, leading to a 26-game season. In the 2002 season, 15 teams played 24 matches across 26 weeks, with each team receiving two byes throughout the year. In the 2007 season, with the addition of the Gold Coast Titans, 16 teams played 24 matches over 25 weeks, receiving one bye each. Round 26 was added back into the season schedule the following year, and remained until 2018, when that round was taken off again. In the 2020 NRL season, due to the COVID-19 pandemic, the season was placed in a two-month hiatus from March to May. The season was then revised into a 20-game campaign with no byes. It also held the competition's first matches behind closed doors. In the 2023 season, with the addition of the Dolphins, the teams played 24 matches over 27 weeks, receiving three byes each. There was previously a representative weekend in May/June, when no clubs played to make way for tests and State of Origin, but this was scrapped with the change in schedule for the 2023 season.

Currently, seasons are 27 rounds long with 24 matches being played by each club.
