= Nils Nielsen =

Danish football manager (born 1971)

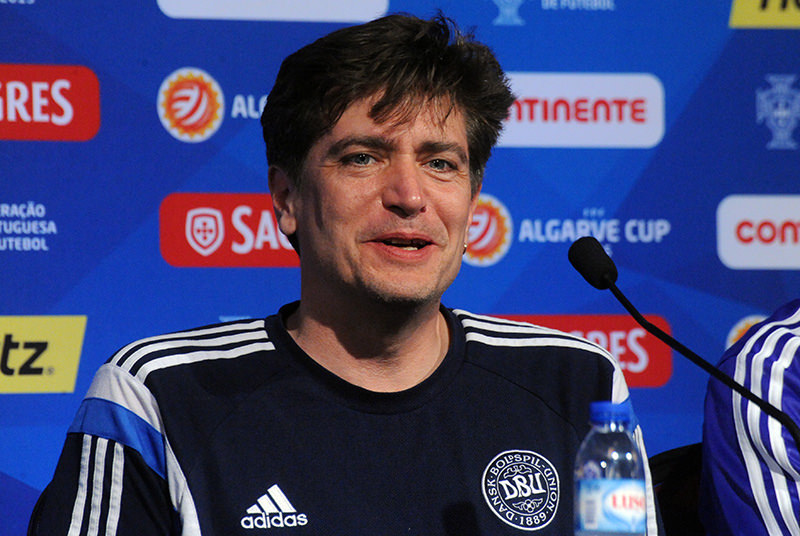
- Nielsen at the 2015 Algarve Cup

Personal information
- Full name: Nils Herbert Kromann Nielsen
- Date of birth: 3 November 1971 (age 54)
- Place of birth: Nuuk, Greenland

Managerial career
- Years: Team
- 2012–2013: Denmark U18
- 2013–2017: Denmark Women
- 2018: China U20 Women (assistant)
- 2018–2022: Switzerland Women
- 2024–2026: Japan Women

Nils Herbert Kromann Nielsen (born 3 November 1971) is a Greenlandic-Danish football manager.

Nielsen is best known for his tenure with the Denmark women's national football team from 2013 to 2017. He led the Danes to a runners-up finish at the UEFA Women's Euro 2017. Despite departing the team shortly after, Nielsen received acclaim for his work and finished runner-up in the 2017 The Best FIFA Women's Coach award. He spent most of 2018 as the assistant manager of the China women's national under-20 football team, taking them to the 2018 FIFA U-20 Women's World Cup. He was also manager of the Switzerland women's national football team from 2018 to 2022.

On 12 December 2024, Nielsen was appointed as the new coach of the Japan women's national football team.

== Career ==
=== Early career ===
After hopes of a playing career were ended through serious injury, Nielsen turned his attention to coaching. At 20 years old, Nielsen received special dispensation from the Danish FA to take his UEFA A Licence.

In the early years of his career, he held various academy coaching roles with FC Copenhagen, Aalborg BK, Odense Boldklub, Brøndby IF, and Akademisk Boldklub Gladsaxe. He also worked with the Danish Football Federation’s U15 and U16 boys’ teams. In 2011, Nielsen was appointed as the head coach of Denmark men’s national U18 team.

=== Denmark Women ===
In 2013, Nielsen moved into women's football as the head coach of Denmark women's national team. At UEFA Women's Euro 2017, he led the team to their first major tournament final after securing a 2–1 quarter-final victory over defending champions Germany. Following a penalty shootout win over Austria in the semi-finals, Denmark advanced to the final. Despite a 4–2 defeat to the Netherlands at the De Grolsch Veste in Enschede, the runner-up finish remains the Danish women’s national team’s most successful result in a major competition. Following this achievement, Nielsen was named the runner-up for the 2017 The Best FIFA Women's Coach award.

=== China U20 Women ===
In early 2018, Nielsen joined Peter Bonde in China to serve as the assistant coach for the China women's national under-20 team, helping them prepare for the 2018 FIFA U-20 Women's World Cup in France.

=== Switzerland Women ===
In December 2018, Nielsen was appointed head coach of the Switzerland women's national team. He successfully guided the Swiss to UEFA Women's Euro 2022, though they were eliminated in the group stage after a 4–1 defeat to the Netherlands in their final group match. In October 2022, he led Switzerland to qualification for the 2023 FIFA Women's World Cup after a 2–1 play-off victory over Wales.

=== Manchester City Women ===
On 4 May 2023, Nielsen moved into an executive role, becoming the first Director of Football for Manchester City Women. At the Women's Super League club, he was responsible for coach and player development, as well as player recruitment from the girls’ academy to the senior team. During his tenure, Nielsen facilitated the recruitment of several international players and secured key contract renewals, most notably for Japanese midfielder Yui Hasegawa in early 2024.

=== Japan Women ===
On December 12, 2024, Nielsen made history by becoming the first foreign head coach of the Japan women's national team (Nadeshiko Japan). His tenure began with a 4–0 win against Australia at the 2025 SheBelieves Cup, which Japan went on to win after a 2–1 final victory over the USA.

In March 2026, Nielsen led Japan to their third AFC Women's Asian Cup title. After securing automatic qualification for the 2027 FIFA Women's World Cup by reaching the knockout stages, his side advanced to the final following a 4–1 semi-final victory over South Korea. On 21 March 2026, Nielsen guided Japan to a 1–0 win over hosts Australia in the final at Stadium Australia in Sydney. This victory marked the first major continental trophy of Nielsen's managerial career.

On 2 April 2026, it was announced that Nielsen had stepped down as head coach upon expiry of his contract. The non-renewal of contract was attributed to "communication issues and cultural differences". Women's national team director Norio Sasaki have expressed skepticism on Japan's upcoming World Cup bid if Nielsen remain in his role. Sasaki described Nielsen's coaching style as "a little too lax, a little too soft".

== Personal life ==
Nielsen was born in Greenland, to Danish parents who worked as teachers. During his early years, Nielsen lived in a small village of only 25 inhabitants. After his parents separated when he was five years old, Nielsen moved back to mainland Denmark with his mother.

Born with back problems, Nielsen was medically advised against playing football. He defied these warnings by undertaking muscular strength training to compensate for the condition and played at a high youth level. However, during a match, he fell into an advertising hoarding and broke a vertebra in his spine. Although he narrowly avoided paraplegia, the injury ended his hopes of a professional playing career. He subsequently turned to coaching, earning his UEFA A Licence at the age of 20, and studied Physiology at the University of Copenhagen.

Beyond football, Nielsen is a published author of a teenage fiction novel. Under the title Ud af skyggen (translated into English in 2026 as Out of the shadows), the novel explores themes of football, friendship, and gambling.

== Honours ==
Denmark Women

- UEFA European Women's Championship runner-up: 2017

Japan Women

- SheBelieves Cup: 2025
- AFC Women's Asian Cup: 2026

Individual

- The Best FIFA Women's Coach runner-up: 2017
