= 2026 AFC Women's Asian Cup final =

Final match of the 2026 Asian Women's Football Championship

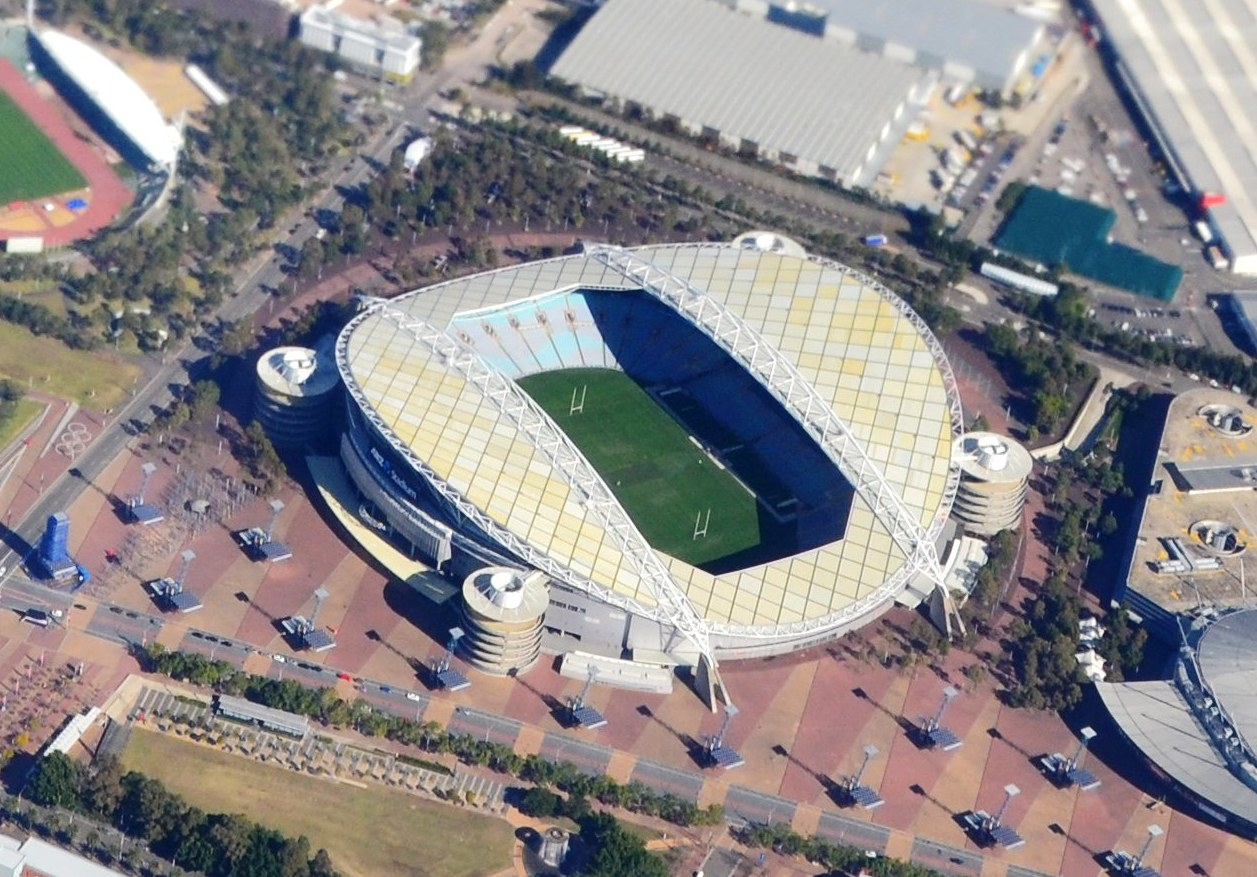
- The final was played at Stadium Australia.
- Event: 2026 AFC Women's Asian Cup
Japan	Australia
1	0
- Date: 21 March 2026
- Venue: Stadium Australia, Sydney, New South Wales
- Player of the Match: Maika Hamano
- Referee: Kim Yu-jeong (South Korea)
- Attendance: 74,397
- Weather: Partly cloudy 22 °C (72 °F); 85% humidity

The 2026 AFC Women's Asian Cup final was a women's football match to determine the winner of the 2026 AFC Women's Asian Cup, the 21st edition of the AFC Women's Asian Cup, a quadrennial tournament contested by the women's national teams of the member associations of the Asian Football Confederation. The match was held on 21 March 2026 at Stadium Australia in Sydney, Australia, between the hosts Australia and Japan. Japan won their third Asian Cup title, emerging victorious 1–0 courtesy of a 17th-minute goal by Maika Hamano, who also won player of the match.

This was the third time in the past four tournaments that Japan and Australia had met in a final, with Japan winning 1–0 in each match. China were the defending champions, having won the tournament in 2022, who were eliminated by Australia in the semi-finals.

The match broke the AFC Women's Asian Cup attendance record, with 74,397 people attending the final. The aftermath of the match is most memorable for both Japan and Australia releasing a joint statement criticising the low prize money given to both teams, as well as the lack of prize money for other competing nations, despite it being the most attended Women's Asian Cup tournament in history and in increase in revenue.

== Background ==
The tournament featured twelve teams divided into three groups of four. The top two teams from each group, along with the two best third-placed teams, advanced to the knockout stage. The 2026 edition continued the expansion from previous tournaments, with eight teams competing in the knockout phase. Video assistant referee (VAR) technology was used throughout the knockout stage to assist refereeing decisions.

Japan had won the tournament four times, most recently in 2018. Previously, they were the 2011 FIFA Women's World Cup champions and runners-up in 2015, the only country in the Asian confederation to have won a World Cup. They were the highest-ranked team in the tournament, ranked number eight in the world when the tournament began. Japan hired its first non-Japanese coach, Nils Nielsen, in 2024, winning the 2025 SheBelieves Cup, its first tournament win since 2018, after a period of challenges in keeping up with the rising improvement of other nations at the international level.

Australia sought its second championship, having last won in 2010, while also competing at a home tournament for a second time after the 2023 FIFA Women's World Cup. At the beginning of the tournament, they were ranked 15th in the world and were the third-highest country in the Asian confederation, behind Japan and North Korea. They were previously eliminated in the quarterfinals in 2022, their worst result at an Asian Cup. Like their fellow finalists, Australia was competing under a new manager, fellow Australian Joe Montemurro, who took over the team from interim coach Tom Sermanni in June 2025.

== Venue ==
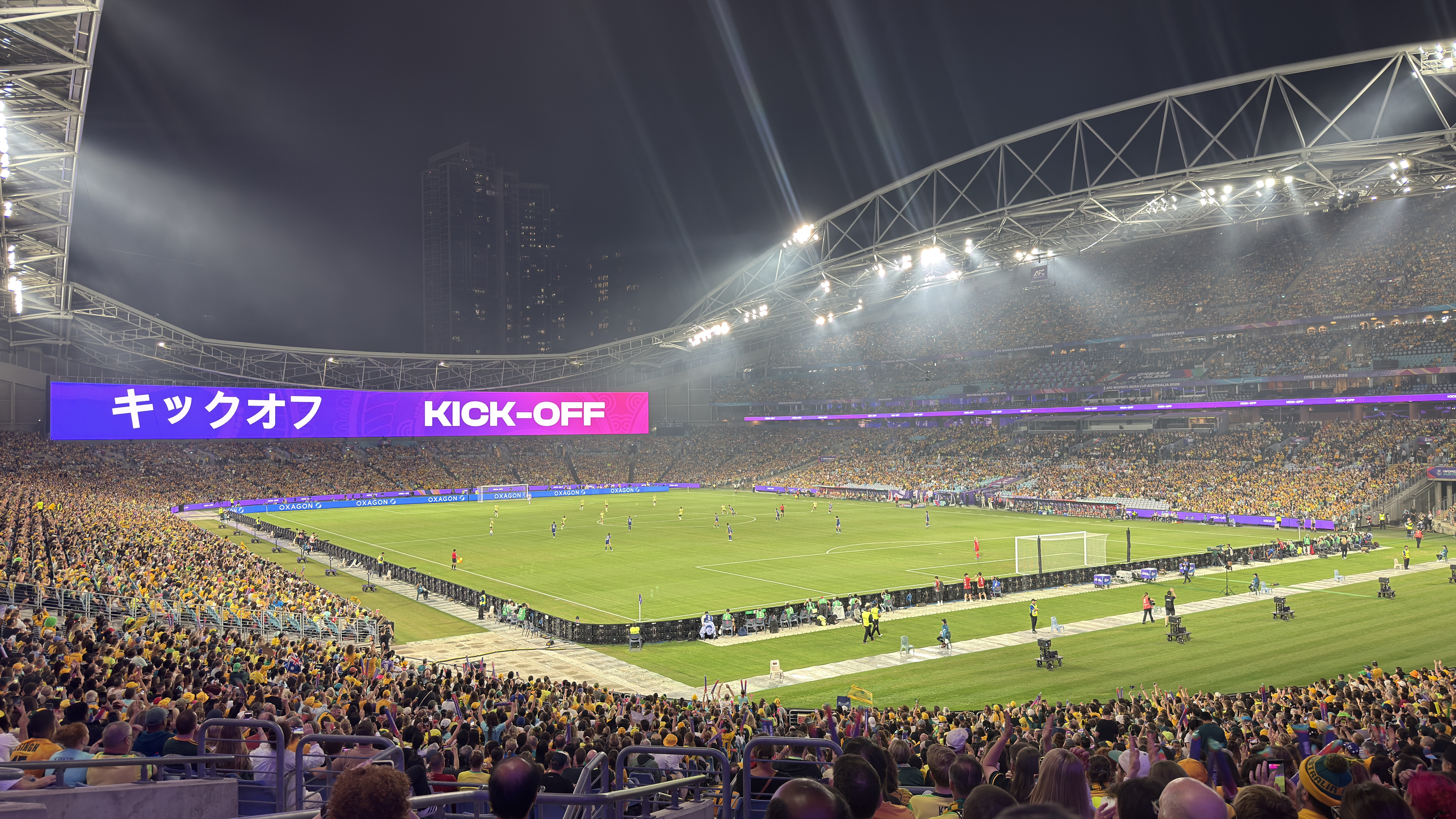
The scene inside Stadium Australia at kickoff

The final was held at Stadium Australia (also known as Accor Stadium) in Sydney, New South Wales. The venue which has a capacity of 79,500, hosted five matches during the Asian Cup which included a semi-final. The stadium was confirmed to be the host of the final when the final stadiums for the Asian Cup was confirmed on 27 February 2025.

Built for the 2000 Summer Olympics, it opened in March 1999. In addition to the opening and closing ceremonies and the track and field events, the stadium hosted the men's football gold medal match. The venue was also chosen as a venue for the men's 2015 AFC Asian Cup, where it hosted seven matches including the final, which Australia won against South Korea to win the tournament for the first time. It was also the host of the 2005 shootout victory over Uruguay in the OFC–CONMEBOL playoff, which qualified the Socceroos for the 2006 World Cup, their first appearance since 1974. The stadium later hosted the 2023 FIFA Women's World Cup final and was contested by Spain and England. It took place in front of 75,784 supporters, and Spain won the final 1–0 through a goal from Olga Carmona, assisted by Mariona Caldentey.

== Route to the final ==
=== Japan ===
==== Group stage ====
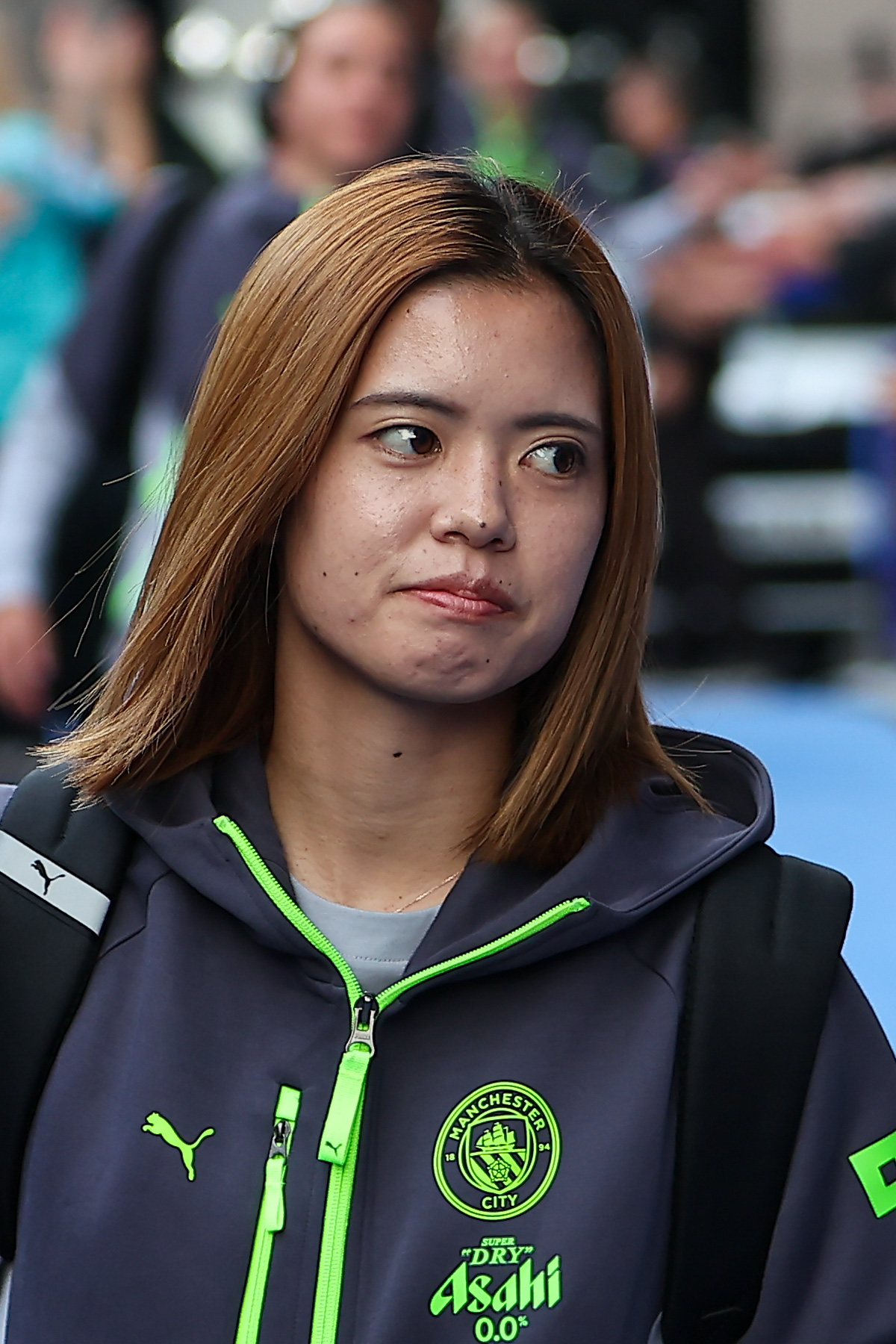
Japanese midfielder, Yui Hasegawa was named as squad captain for the tournament.

Japan's opening match of the tournament was against Chinese Taipei, with the match finishing with a 2–0 win, courtesy of goals from Momoko Tanikawa and Kiko Seike, as the temperature reached 36 degrees. Tanikawa's goal notably did not occur until the 61st minute, with the score remaining 0–0 despite Japan having nearly 90% possession throughout the match. Their second pool game against India, Japan scored 11 goals, which included hattricks for both Hinata Miyazawa and Riko Ueki, and had possession for 80% of the overall match. Their first goal of the match coming in the fourth minute from Yuzuki Yamamoto. This victory, due to the goal differential across their first two games, assured that Japan would qualify for the quarterfinals as the number one seed from their pool. Their final match of the pool stage was against Vietnam, winning 4–0, while also achieving 80% possession for the first-half, only for multiple saves by Vietnam's goalkeeper preventing Japan from extending their goal differential; while Japan were able to take advantage of their persistent attack in the second half, scoring three goals.

==== Knockout stage ====
Japan's quarterfinal match would be against Philippines in Sydney, ending 7–0, which continued Japan's unblemished goal defence record in the tournament. The match remained goalless until the 45th minute, with a goal to Mina Tanaka, while another goal by Tōko Koga three minutes into stoppage time meant that Japan would enter half-time with a 2–0 lead. Japan's attack prowess continued to put pressure on opponents, with five goals in the second half of the match.

Japan continued their form into the semi-finals, emerging victorious over South Korea 4–1, with two goals scored in the first half from Golden Boot leader, Ueki, and Maika Hamano. After being criticised for having an "easy" run to the semi-finals, Japan's manager Nils Nielsen was "proud" of the team's performance, and highlighting that, "sometimes it's not easy to just switch and play [a team] that has much more to give and make it look easy — and they actually did it." Nielsen additionally praised South Korea for being a "great" opponent, saying that the game did not feel as easy as it looked.

=== Australia ===
==== Group stage ====
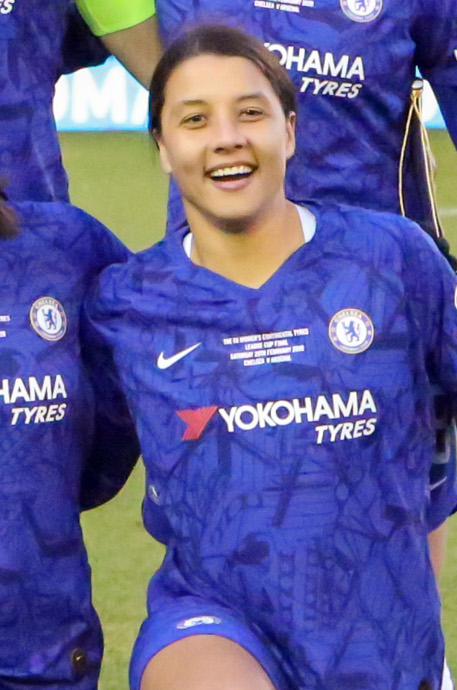
Sam Kerr (pictured playing for Chelsea) was named the Australian women's captain for the tournament. This was her first major international tournament since the 2023 FIFA Women's World Cup.

Australia played the Opening match of the tournament in Perth against Philippines with a 1–0 victory, with the team forced to bring in an extra goalkeeper due to injuries to all three squad goalkeepers, including their number one keeper Mackenzie Arnold. Despite having 85% of possession throughout the entire match, Australia only had six shots at the goal, with manager Joe Montemurro calling their performance "conservative." Australia's second pool game was against Iran at the Gold Coast, played in heavy rain, with the match ending 4–0. The match would see Hayley Raso sustain a concussion after being hit in the head by the ball twice, which put her in doubt to compete for the rest of the tournament; while Alanna Kennedy scored two goals, including the lone goal in the second-half.

Their final pool game against South Korea in Sydney would also determine who would win the pool, with Australia requiring a win to be placed as Group A's number one seeds due to South Korea having a better goal differential. The match would end in a 3–3 draw, with Kennedy scoring two of the three goals. Australia finished the first half with a 2–1 lead, while South Korea dominated possession in the second half, took the lead in the 53rd minute, and prevented Australia from creating opportunities to surpass them. Australian manager, Montemurro, described their defence as being their biggest weakness, describing their defence as being "exposed," acknowledging that the team needed to be "a little bit better and be a little bit smarter" in key moments. The draw to South Korea would mean that Australia would prevent meeting Japan until the final, described by journalists and fans as a "blessing in disguise."

==== Knockout stage ====
Australia's quarterfinal match ended with a victory against North Korea, with Kennedy scoring her fifth goal of the tournament in the ninth minute, while their lead was extended by Sam Kerr in the first two minutes of the second half. North Korea would shrink Australia's lead to 2–1, with goalkeeper Mackenzie Arnold able to maintain Australia's lead with multiple saves in the last 30 minutes of the match, as North Korea managed to take 21 attempted shots at goal, Arnold saving all but one. This win also guaranteed Australia's qualification to the 2027 FIFA Women's World Cup. Australian captain, Kerr, was proud of the team's defensive performance and "mindset" after their early goals in both halves, which "allowed us to go on and defend the game."

Their semi-final match would be against the defending Asian Cup champions, China, in Perth Stadium. Australia would once again win 2–1, and advance to the final, their fifth major tournament final in 15 years. Caitlin Foord would score the first goal of the match in the 17th minute, only for China to level the scoreline 10 minutes later due to a handling error in Australia's defence. The second half would continue to remain a 1-all draw, until Kerr scored, courtesy of an assist from Foord.

=== Path to the final ===
Japan
Round
Australia
Opponents
Results
Group stage
Opponents
Results
Chinese Taipei
2–0
Match 1
Philippines
1–0
India
11–0
Match 2
Iran
4–0
Vietnam
4–0
Match 3
South Korea
3–3
Group C winners

Pos	Team	Pld	Pts
1	Japan	3	9
2	Chinese Taipei	3	6
3	Vietnam	3	3
4	India	3	0

Source: AFC
Final standings
Group A runners-up

Pos	Team	Pld	Pts
1	South Korea	3	7
2	Australia (H)	3	7
3	Philippines	3	3
4	Iran	3	0

Source: AFC
(H) Hosts
Opponents
Results
Knockout stage
Opponents
Results
Philippines
7–0
Quarter-final
North Korea
2–1
South Korea
4–1
Semi-final
China
2–1

== Pre-match ==
=== Lead up to the final ===
Japan entered the final as favourites after going through the tournament undefeated and was the highest-ranked team in Asia. Japanese team manager Nils Nielsen, when asked to comment about his team being tipped to win the final, humorously responded, "I will be completely honest with you. That question about who's the favourite in the final, it's like asking a bee to explain to a fly why honey is better than shit," going on to state that both teams had equal chances to win the final. In their previous encounter at the 2025 SheBelieves Cup, Japan was the 4–0 winner over Australia and had previously beaten Australia 1–0 in their two previous Asian Cup finals in 2014 and 2018. Japan's strength in creating attacking opportunities without possession had contributed to their overwhelming dominance in the tournament, while their squad also had depth that allowed most of their team to compete and rest throughout the tournament. Japan had also not conceded a goal throughout the tournament until their semi-final against South Korea and had scored 28 goals across their five matches.

After co-hosting the 2023 FIFA Women's World Cup, Australia had a rare opportunity to attempt a tournament win on home soil for the second time, with Ellie Carpenter calling the chance to win a tournament final at home "a once-in-a-lifetime opportunity." They were also looking for their second Women's Asian Cup victory, their lone victory occurring in 2010, when they beat North Korea 5–4. Current Australian captain, Sam Kerr was the only member of the 2010 winning Asian Cup squad to remain in the Australian squad and was the opening goal scorer in the final. Their main strikers, Kerr and Mary Fowler, were playing their first tournaments since both of them had sustained ACL injuries, with Fowler's return marking her first at the professional football level in nearly a year. It was considered by journalists to be the last opportunity of the 'Golden Generation' of the Australian team to win a trophy at a national level. When Australian manager, Joe Montemurro, was asked about Japan's status as 'favourites', he replied, "There's no favourites in the final. It's the best team and the one who wants it more and the one who is smart enough to manage the moments." Steph Catley noted that they had beaten Japan previously and believed that they still had an opportunity to win particularly with the home crowd on their side, stating, "I have been in so many finals where my team is the underdog and no one gave us a chance, then we come out and won." Catley continued to say that the Australian team were "a great side" and that "we back ourselves (to win the final)."

=== Referees ===
South Korean, Kim Yu-jeong, was announced as the lead referee for the final, her first major final in her career. The Assistant Referee roles would be filled by Palestine's Heba Saadieh and Thailand's Supawan Hinthong. The VAR would be led by Thai referee, Sivakorn Pu-Udom, with the assistant role to be performed by Hong Kong's Law Bik Chi. South Korea's Park Mi-suk was named the reserve referee.

=== Entertainment ===
Australian singer G Flip was announced as the pre-match entertainment for the final, who also provided the tournament's official anthem, a cover of "All Fired Up" originally sung by Australian band Rattling Sabres, later made famous by Pat Benatar's cover. They stated that they were, “excited to have the opportunity to perform at the Closing Ceremony and to help celebrate such an incredible moment for women’s football, I’m such a big fan of women’s sports and can’t wait to watch the final match!” They also performed their song "Disco Cowgirl" during their set.

== Match ==
=== Details ===
The match was held at Stadium Australia in Sydney with an attendance of 74,397. Australia had the first chance in the second minute when Mary Fowler's pass found Caitlin Foord, who set up Sam Kerr, but Ayaka Yamashita tipped the shot away. The Japanese goalkeeper was tested again in the 11th minute as Foord raced into the box, only for her effort to be saved by Yamashita. Japan opened the scoring in the 17th minute through Maika Hamano, who curled a shot from outside the box past Mackenzie Arnold. Japan then controlled the game, though Australia came close before halftime, with Sam Kerr and Foord both missing chances, and Arnold making key saves.

In the second half, Japan threatened on the break, including a Hamano cross that Hikaru Kitagawa struck low, saved by Arnold. Australia pressed for an equaliser, with Kyra Cooney-Cross and Foord creating opportunities, but Japan's defence and Yamashita's saves held firm. In the final minutes, Japan blocked several attempts from Emily van Egmond and Foord, with Yamashita producing a crucial save to secure the 1–0 victory and reclaim the title.

21 March 2026
20:00 UTC+11

Japan	1–0	Australia
Hamano 17'	Report (AFC); Report (FIFA)

Stadium Australia, Sydney
Attendance: 74,397
Referee: Kim Yu-jeong (South Korea)

Japan

Team stats
Japan	Statistics	Australia
9	Shots	16
3	Shots on target	5
46%	Possession	54%
361	Passes	442
81%	Pass accuracy	84%
1	Fouls	6
0	Yellow cards	0
0	Red cards	0
6	Offsides	0
2	Corners	4

Australia

GK	1	Ayaka Yamashita
RB	5	Hana Takahashi
CB	6	Tōko Koga
CB	4	Saki Kumagai
LB	13	Hikaru Kitagawa	(substituted off) 82'
RM	15	Aoba Fujino
CM	7	Hinata Miyazawa
CM	10	Fuka Nagano
LM	17	Maika Hamano	(substituted off) 76'
CAM	14	Yui Hasegawa (c)	(substituted off) 82'
ST	9	Riko Ueki	(substituted off) 57'
Substitutions:
ST	20	Manaka Matsukubo	(substituted on) 57'
LF	25	Remina Chiba	(substituted on) 76'
CB	3	Moeka Minami	(substituted on) 82'
LB	21	Miyabi Moriya	(substituted on) 82'
Manager:
(Denmark) Nils Nielsen

GK	1	Mackenzie Arnold
RB	21	Ellie Carpenter
CB	3	Winonah Heatley
CB	7	Steph Catley
LB	8	Kaitlyn Torpey
CM	23	Kyra Cooney-Cross	(substituted off) 83'
CM	14	Alanna Kennedy
RW	11	Mary Fowler	(substituted off) 83'
CF	19	Katrina Gorry	(substituted off) 64'
LW	9	Caitlin Foord
ST	20	Sam Kerr (c)
Substitutions:
CF	16	Hayley Raso	(substituted on) 64'
CM	6	Clare Wheeler	(substituted on) 83'
RW	10	Emily van Egmond	(substituted on) 83'
Manager:
(Australia) Joe Montemurro

Assistant referees:
Heba Saadieh (Palestine)
Supawan Hinthong (Thailand)
Fourth official:
Oh Hyeon-jeong (South Korea)
Video Assistant Referee (VAR):
Sivakorn Pu-udom (Thailand)
Assistant VAR:
Law Bik Chi (Hong Kong)

== Post-match ==
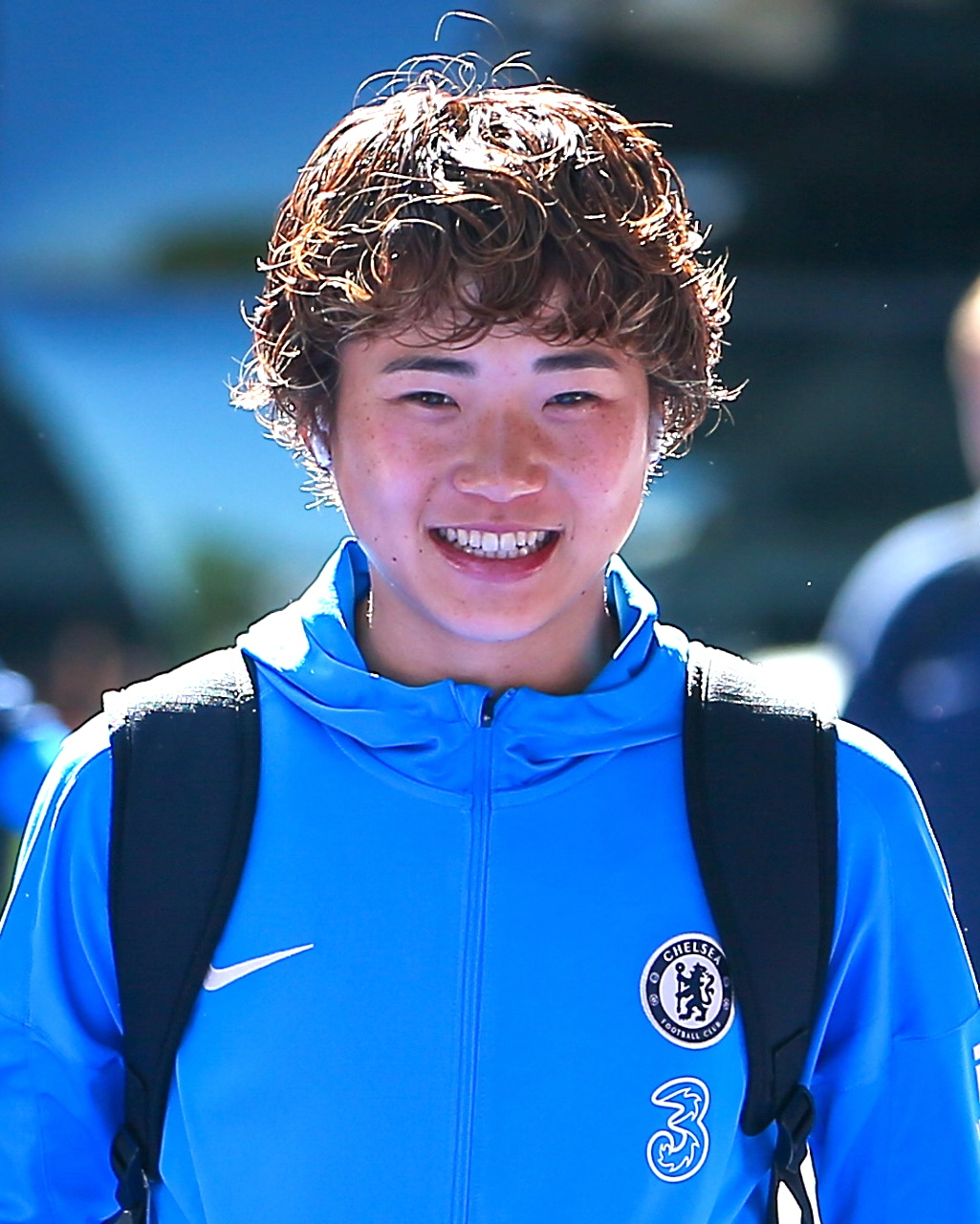
Japan's Maika Hamano (pictured playing for Chelsea) was awarded the player of the match and scored the lone goal that won Japan the tournament.

Japan's victory was their third Asian Cup title in the past four tournaments, having previously won in 2014 and 2018, both against Australia with the same scoreline, and was their first major tournament victory in eight years. The victory also confirmed their place at the 2027 FIFA Women's World Cup, alongside runners-up Australia, China, South Korea, the Philippines, and North Korea. The player of the match was awarded to Maika Hamano, with her goal in the 17th minute proving crucial to Japan's path to winning the tournament, as Japan spend most of the match having to defend and protect their lead. Hamano's 17th minute goal was described as one of the goals of the tournament, beating most of Australia's defensive line and shooting from just outside the box, described as "a stunner" and "unstoppable goal." Riko Ueki won the Golden Boot for most goals scored, while Ayaka Yamashita was awarded the goalkeeper of the tournament. Yamashita's defence, particularly in the second half, proved to be essential in Japan winning back the Asian Cup title. In the post-match press conference, Japan's manager, Nils Nielsen praised the team's resilience, "We found a way to win the game, even if it wasn't our best game, and we couldn't really find our own rhythm."

For Australia, the loss continued a 16-year drought without a major trophy. Their performance in the final was the closest that any team had been to defeating Japan in the tournament, despite having most of the scoring opportunities and possession–particularly in the second half– Japan's defence, as well as the saves performed by Japan's goalkeeper Yamashita prevented Australia from levelling the scoreline. Alanna Kennedy was awarded the player of the tournament during the presentation ceremony who continued to remain optimistic about Australia's chances in ending the trophy drought, although acknowledged it was "tough" to compete in another tournament and finish with "no silverware." Australian manager, Joe Montemurro, also continued to remain positive after the match, stating the team should be "proud" and that "they can't drop their heads." Montemurro also discussed his will to "(try) to keep the belief going" moving forward into the next tournaments, including the 2027 FIFA Women's World Cup and the 2028 Summer Olympics.

The attendance for the final of 74,397 people, was the largest attendance for an Asian Cup match in the tournament's history.

== Aftermath ==
=== Prize money controversy ===
On April 2nd, 2026, both Japan and Australia released a joint statement criticising the AFC's distribution of prize money for the tournament. The predominant critique of both teams was the large inequality of prize money between the men's and women's Asian Cup tournaments, while the men's tournament in 2023 had a prize pool of $21.5 million AUD, the women's did not receive an increase from the 2022 tournament and received the exact same prize pool, which totalled $2.62 million AUD. This made the women's Asian Cup the lowest-paid continental tournament in the world, despite the tournament being the most attended in women's AFC history, and the tournament receiving a significant increase in revenue. Both Japan and Australia revealed that they were part of discussions pre-tournament with the AFC in regards to the low prize-money offered, alongside South Korea, Philippines, Chinese Taipei, India and Uzbekistan, however, as noted in their joint statement, "Our pre-tournament invitation to the AFC to work together on equal prize money, a guaranteed share to all players, and to co-develop a lasting legacy has so far been ignored." Additionally, across the tournament, only the four semi-finalists, Japan, Australia, China and South Korea received prize money, while no participation fee was awarded to the rest of the teams. For making the final, it was reported that the Australian team received only $8,800 AUD per player, five times less than the men's runners-up in 2023.

The low prize-money pool was contrasted with FIFA President Gianni Infantino's statement of the aim to have equal pay between the men's and women's tournaments by the 2027 FIFA Women's World Cup, as well as FIFPRO's report with a predicted forecast of a revenue intake of $82.4 million USD. With the AFC, revealing before the start of the tournament that prize money would not increase despite these reports, with their justification being, “The current strategy focuses on long-term development of the women’s game across Asia. Further, it is to be noted that the prize fund of all competitions is closely tied to commercial revenues such as broadcasting and sponsorships." The AFC continued to state that the tournament was "still growing" and would increase value only if it was commercially successful. FIFPRO's Asia and Oceania Secretary General, Shoko Tsuji, was critical of the AFC's response, by noting that "Australia is hosting this tournament now, and a world-class event can’t ask players to wait for future improvements."

== See also ==
- 2026 AFC Women's Asian Cup knockout stage
