= Easter Monday match (NRL) =

Annual rugby match in Australia

- Sport: Rugby league
- Location: Sydney, Australia
- Teams: Parramatta Eels; Wests Tigers
- First meeting: 21 April 2014; Wests Tigers 21–18 Parramatta
- Latest meeting: 6 April 2026; Wests Tigers 22–20 Parramatta
- Broadcasters: Fox League

Statistics
- Most wins: Tied; 5 wins
- Largest victory: Parramatta Eels; 45 points (22 April 2019)

The Easter Monday match is held annually on the Easter Monday holiday in Australia between the Parramatta Eels and Wests Tigers. It is generally played at Stadium Australia, however Parramatta home matches were held at Western Sydney Stadium from 2019.

== Background ==
The match has traditionally drawn large crowds, including selling out the opening of the new Western Sydney Stadium, where the Parramatta club defeated the Wests Tigers by a record-breaking 51–6.

No event was held in 2020 due to the season being suspended due to the COVID-19 pandemic.

== Head-to-head record ==
As of April 2024

Team	P	W	D	L	PF	PA	PD
Parramatta Eels	10	5	0	5	230	182	+48
Wests Tigers	10	5	0	5	182	230	−48

== Results ==
Scores with an asterisk (*) indicate golden point games.

Season	Winner	Score	Venue	Attendance	Ref.
2014	Wests Tigers	21–18	Stadium Australia	50,688	
2015	Wests Tigers	22–6	Stadium Australia	35,510	
2016	Parramatta Eels	8–0	Stadium Australia	36,112	
2017	Parramatta Eels	26–22	Stadium Australia	28,249	
2018	Wests Tigers	30–20	Stadium Australia	30,420	
2019	Parramatta Eels	51–6	Western Sydney Stadium	29,047	
2021	Parramatta Eels	36–22	Stadium Australia	29,056	
2022	Wests Tigers	21–20	Western Sydney Stadium	28,336	
2023	Parramatta Eels	28–22	Stadium Australia	28,611	
2024	Wests Tigers	17–16	Western Sydney Stadium	28,608	
2025	Parramatta Eels	38–22	Western Sydney Stadium	26,145	
2026	Wests Tigers	22–20*	Western Sydney Stadium	29,397	

== See also ==
- NRL Good Friday Game
- ANZAC Day Cup
- King's Birthday match (NRL)
