= 2018 AFC Women's Asian Cup final =

- The venue of the final
- Event: 2018 AFC Women's Asian Cup
Japan	Australia
(Japan)	(Australia)
1	0
- Date: 20 April 2018
- Venue: Amman International Stadium, Amman
- Referee: Ri Hyang-ok (North Korea)
- Attendance: 3,065

The 2018 AFC Women's Asian Cup final was a football match at the Amman International Stadium in Amman, Jordan which determined the winner of the 2018 AFC Women's Asian Cup. The final was contested between Japan and Australia, teams which were also the finalists of the previous edition held in 2014.

Japan defeated Australia 1–0 in the final to win their second consecutive title.

== Background ==
Japan were the defending champions of the AFC Women's Asian Cup having defeated Australia in the final of the 2014 edition in Vietnam to win their first continental title. The two sides had met in the group stage of the 2018 AFC Women's Asian Cup. Their encounter ended in a 1–1 draw.

The match also marked Australia's third consecutive appearance in a Women's Asian Cup final. This feat was last achieved by China which featured in the final of the 2003, 2006, and 2008 editions.

Australia's previous victory against Japan in a major tournament was their match up at the 2010 AFC Women's Asian Cup in Vietnam, where it knockout their East Asian opposition out of the semifinals and win the title. Australia has been beaten by Japan since then including their quarter final loss in the 2015 FIFA Women's World Cup.

== Route to the final ==
Australia and Japan were both part of Group B in the group stage. Australia finished as group leaders and had to face second-placers Thailand in the semifinal while Japan had to play against China, the Group A leaders. The semifinalists of the tournament including Australia and Japan secured a berth at the 2019 FIFA Women's World Cup by finishing among the top two teams in their group.

Australia was trailing 1–2 to Thailand in their semifinal tie before Australia made an equalizer just before the end of the regulation time. This meant that the match had to go to extra time but no further goals were made and penalty shoot-out was held to determine which among the two teams to advance to the final. Australia outscored Thailand in the penalties. Japan won over China in the other semifinal with the sole Chinese goal being scored from a penalty kick in the 90th minute.

Japan
Round
Australia
Opponent
Result
Group stage
Opponent
Result
Vietnam
4–0
Match 1
South Korea
0–0
South Korea
0–0
Match 2
Vietnam
8–0
Australia
1–1
Match 3
Japan
1–1

Group B runner-up
Team	Pld	W	D	L	GF	GA	GD	Pts
Australia	3	1	2	0	9	1	+8	5
Japan	3	1	2	0	5	1	+4	5
South Korea	3	1	2	0	4	0	+4	5
Vietnam	3	0	0	3	0	16	−16	0

Final standings

Group B winner
Team	Pld	W	D	L	GF	GA	GD	Pts
Australia	3	1	2	0	9	1	+8	5
Japan	3	1	2	0	5	1	+4	5
South Korea	3	1	2	0	4	0	+4	5
Vietnam	3	0	0	3	0	16	−16	0

Opponent
Result
Knockout stage
Opponent
Result
China
3–1
Semi-finals
Thailand
2–2 (a.e.t.)
(3–1 p)

== Match ==
Australian winger Hayley Raso, right knee injury, was ruled out of the final.

In the first half, Australia had a chance to score when they were awarded a penalty after Saki Kumagai handled Tameka Butt’s shot at goal in the 14th minute, but Ayaka Yamashita saved the penalty from Elise Kellond-Knight.

In the 84th minute, substitute Kumi Yokoyama received the ball from Yui Hasegawa and shot the ball into the top corner of the net from 18 yards scoring the winning goal.

=== Details ===
20 April 2018
20:00 AST

Japan	1–0	Australia
Yokoyama 84'	Report

Amman International Stadium, Amman
Attendance: 3,065
Referee: Ri Hyang-ok (North Korea)

Japan	Australia

GK	18	Ayaka Yamashita
RB	22	Risa Shimizu
CB	4	Saki Kumagai (c)	(yellow card) 14'
CB	5	Nana Ichise
LB	10	Mizuho Sakaguchi
RM	7	Emi Nakajima
CM	14	Yui Hasegawa
CM	2	Rumi Utsugi
LM	3	Aya Sameshima
SS	13	Yuika Sugasawa		(substituted off) 72'
CF	8	Mana Iwabuchi
Substitutes:
GK	1	Sakiko Ikeda
GK	21	Chika Hirao
DF	6	Saori Ariyoshi
DF	17	Hikari Takagi
DF	23	Shiori Miyake
MF	12	Hikaru Naomoto
MF	15	Moeno Sakaguchi
MF	16	Rin Sumida
MF	19	Rika Masuya
FW	9	Nahomi Kawasumi
FW	11	Mina Tanaka
FW	20	Kumi Yokoyama		(substituted on) 72'
Manager:
Asako Takakura

GK	1	Lydia Williams
RB	8	Elise Kellond-Knight	(yellow card) 80'
CB	4	Clare Polkinghorne
CB	14	Alanna Kennedy
LB	7	Steph Catley (c)
CM	10	Emily van Egmond
CM	6	Chloe Logarzo
RW	21	Ellie Carpenter
AM	13	Tameka Butt
LW	11	Lisa De Vanna		(substituted off) 60'
CF	20	Sam Kerr
Substitutes:
GK	12	Casey Dumont
GK	18	Mackenzie Arnold
DF	2	Caitlin Cooper
DF	5	Laura Alleway
MF	3	Aivi Luik
MF	9	Alex Chidiac
MF	19	Katrina Gorry
FW	15	Emily Gielnik
FW	17	Kyah Simon		(substituted on) 60'
FW	22	Larissa Crummer
FW	23	Michelle Heyman
Manager:
Alen Stajcic

== Aftermath ==
Japan won their second AFC Women's Asian Cup title. Japan's win also marks the first time a national team won the continental title two times consecutively, a feat last done North Korea who emerged champions of the 2001 and 2003 editions. It was also the first title won by Japan women's team under the tutelage of manager, Asako Takakura and the third major title within the last seven years.
