= Stadium Australia =

Multi-purpose stadium in Sydney, New South Wales, Australia

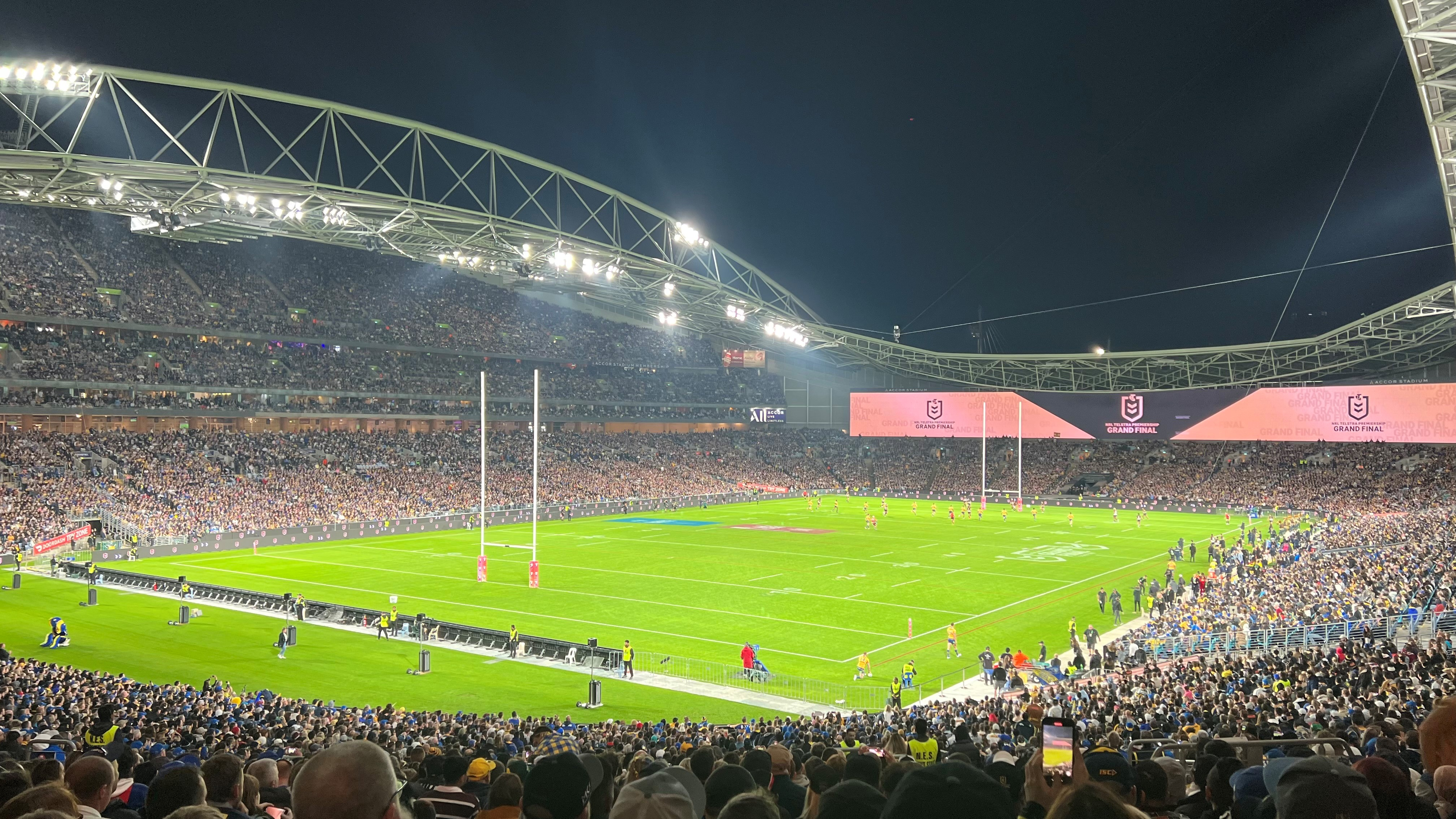
- The stadium during the 2022 NRL Grand Final
- Interactive map of Stadium Australia
- Former names: Sydney Olympic Stadium (1999–2001, 2025); Telstra Stadium (2002–2007); ANZ Stadium (2008–2020)
- Location: Sydney Olympic Park, New South Wales, Australia
- Coordinates: 33°50′50″S 151°03′47″E
- Owner: Venues NSW via Government of New South Wales
- Operator: VenuesLive Management Services
- Capacity: 83,000 (expandable to 115,000) 115,000 (2000 Summer Olympics)
- Surface: Grass
- Record attendance: 114,714: 2000 Olympics closing ceremony
- Field size: 160 m × 118 m (525 ft × 387 ft)
- Public transit: Olympic Park; Special event buses

Construction
- Groundbreaking: 12 September 1996; 30 years ago
- Opened: 6 March 1999; 27 years ago
- Cost: A$690 million
- Architect: HOK Sport

Tenants
- Rugby league New South Wales Blues (State of Origin; 1999–present); Canterbury-Bankstown Bulldogs (NRL; 1999–2000, 2006-present); South Sydney Rabbitohs (NRL; 2006–present); St George Illawarra Dragons (NRL; 2008, 2014–2017); Wests Tigers (NRL; 2005–2008, 2014–2018); Parramatta Eels (NRL; 2017–2019) Rugby union Australia national rugby union team (selected matches) Association football Western Sydney Wanderers (A-League; 2016–2019); Australia men's national soccer team (selected matches); Australia women's national soccer team (selected matches); Sydney FC (selected matches) Cricket New South Wales cricket team Sydney Thunder (BBL; 2012–2015) Australian rules football GWS Giants (2012–2013; 2022); Sydney Swans (2002–2015)

Website
- accorstadium.com.au

Stadium Australia (known under naming rights as Accor Stadium) is a multi-purpose stadium located in the Sydney Olympic Park in Sydney. The stadium is primarily used for rugby league as the home ground of the South Sydney Rabbitohs and Canterbury-Bankstown Bulldogs in the National Rugby League (NRL) as well as the New South Wales Blues in State of Origin and the venue for the NRL Grand Final. It also frequently hosts the Australia national rugby union team, Australia men's national soccer team, and Australia women's national soccer team.

The stadium opened in 1999, in time for its use as a primary venue in the 2000 Summer Olympics. At the time of opening the stadium featured a capacity of 115,000 spectators, making it the largest Olympic Stadium ever built and the largest stadium in Australia at the time. However since then reconfiguration work has occurred to add movable seating, able to be converted between rectangular and oval configurations, and a current capacity of 80,000 spectators. The stadium was constructed at a cost of $690 million and is operated by Venues NSW.

The stadium is the host of the annual NRL Grand Final, and is one of the primary stadiums in the annual State of Origin series. The stadium also hosted the opening and closing ceremonies of the 2000 Summer Olympics, where it also hosted athletics and the football final. The stadium has also hosted matches during the 2023 FIFA Women’s World Cup, including the final. It also hosted games in the 2003 Rugby World Cup, including the opening and the final, the 2015 AFC Asian Cup, including the final, and the 2026 AFC Women's Asian Cup including the final.

== History ==
=== Early history ===
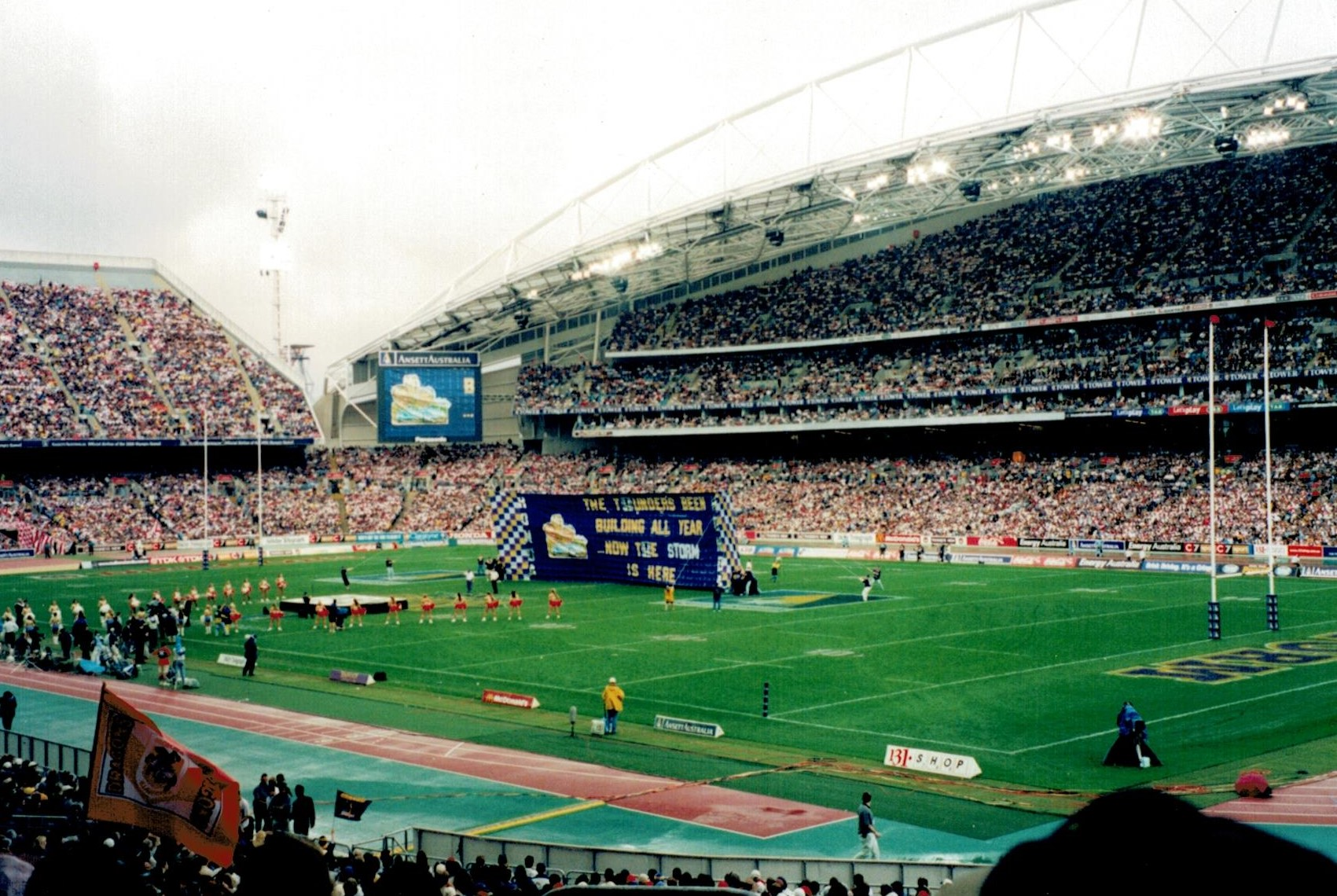
A rugby league match was the stadium's first event, and has since become the venue's predominant sport, hosting the annual NRL Grand Final since the 1999 match (pictured).

The first sporting event held at the stadium was on 6 March 1999 when a then-record rugby league crowd of 104,583 watched the NRL first round double-header, featuring Newcastle v Manly and Parramatta v St George Illawarra Dragons. The attendance broke the old record of 102,569 set at the Odsal Stadium in Bradford, England for the Challenge Cup Final replay between Warrington and Halifax held on 5 May 1954.

The first concert at the stadium was the Bee Gees, on 27 March 1999. The band had embarked on what would be their final world tour before the death of Maurice Gibb, the tour ending in the newly built Olympic Stadium. The show was sold out with an attendance of 66,285.

The stadium was officially opened on 12 June 1999 when the Australian National Soccer team played the FIFA All Stars. Australia won the match 3–2 in front of a crowd of 88,101. Stadium Australia also played host to the national side's historic playoff win over Uruguay in November 2005, a victory which granted Australia FIFA World Cup qualification for only the second time. The event attracted a virtual capacity crowd of 82,698.

The 1999 Bledisloe Cup rugby union match between Australia and New Zealand attracted a then-world record rugby union crowd of 107,042. In 2000, this was bettered when a near-capacity crowd of 109,874 (capacity at the time was 110,000) witnessed the "greatest ever rugby match" when a Jonah Lomu try sealed an All Blacks win over the Wallabies 39–35.

An exhibition soccer match between the Australia national team and English club Manchester United was played on 18 July 1999, with Manchester United winning 1–0 in front of 78,000 spectators.

On 9 June 1999, the stadium hosted its first State of Origin game between New South Wales and Queensland. The match, game 2 of the three-game series, saw the record Origin attendance in Sydney when 88,336 saw the Blues christen their new home with a 12–8 win. The attendance broke the Origin attendance record of 87,161 set at the Melbourne Cricket Ground for Game 2 of the 1994 series.

On 7 August 1999, a National Football League (American football) exhibition game called the American Bowl was played between the Denver Broncos and the San Diego Chargers, bringing home former Australian Football League player Darren Bennett, the Chargers' punter. The Broncos won the game 20–17 in front of 73,811 spectators. This was Australia's first, and currently only, American Bowl game.

The 1999 National Rugby League grand final, played on 26 September between the Melbourne Storm and the St George Illawarra Dragons, broke the rugby league world-record crowd, set earlier in the season, when 107,999 came to watch the Storm defeat the Dragons 20–18 to win their first NRL premiership.

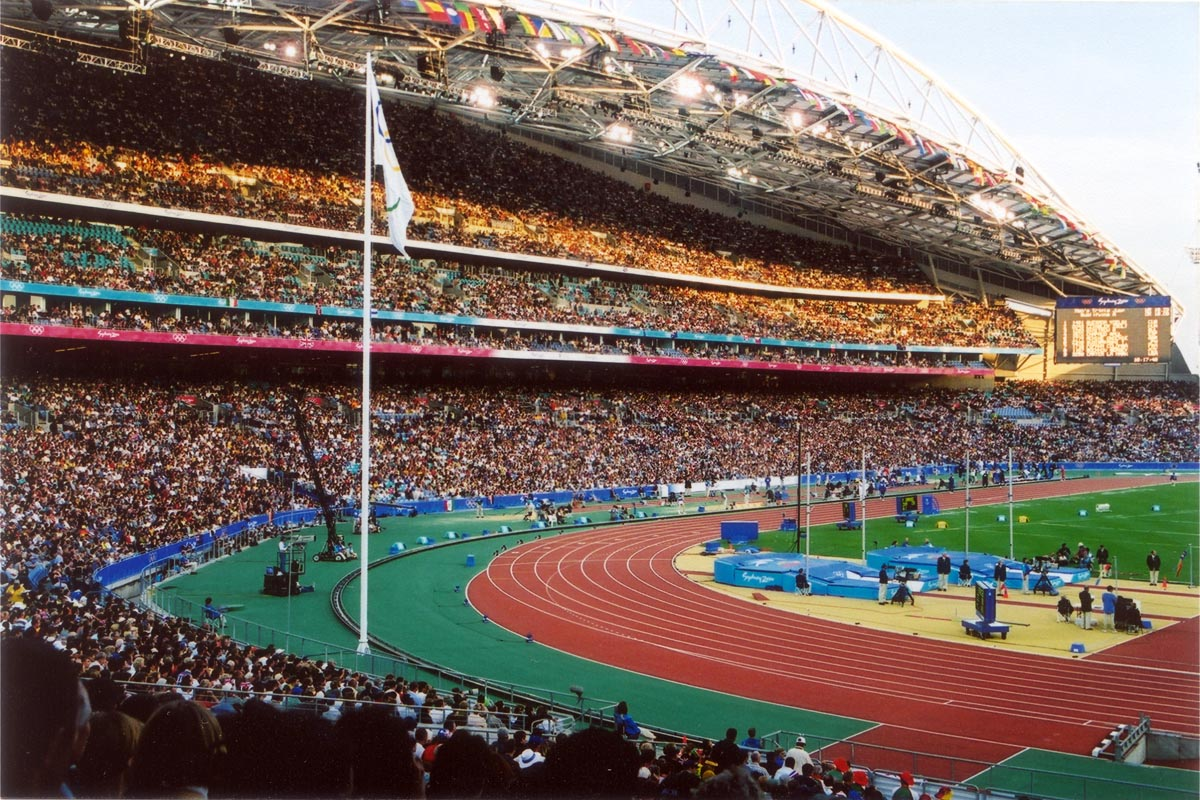
During the 2000 Summer Olympics, the stadium primarily hosted track and field athletics events.

During the 2000 Olympics, the evening athletics sessions on day 11 attracted 112,524 spectators on the night that Australia's Cathy Freeman won the Olympic Gold Medal for the Women's 400 metres. As of 2014, this remains the world record attendance for any athletics event. Also during the Olympics, the soccer final attracted 104,098 to witness Cameroon defeat Spain for its first-ever Olympic gold medal. This was an Olympic Games football attendance record, breaking the record of 101,799 set at the Rose Bowl during the Gold medal game of the 1984 Olympic Games in Los Angeles between France and Brazil.

The opening ceremony for the 2000 Summer Olympics at the stadium completely sold out all 110,000 seats, while the highest attendance for any event in modern Olympic Games history was recorded with 114,714 at the stadium for the closing ceremony of the same Games. Musical acts for the closing ceremony were a "who's who" of Australian music including Kylie Minogue, John Williamson, John Paul Young, Jimmy Barnes, Midnight Oil, INXS (with Jon Stevens), Men at Work, and Slim Dusty who sang Waltzing Matilda. Also in attendance on stage during the closing ceremony were other famous Australians including golfer Greg Norman and comedian-actor Paul Hogan. The venue also hosted the same events during the 2000 Summer Paralympics.

=== Post-reconfiguration ===
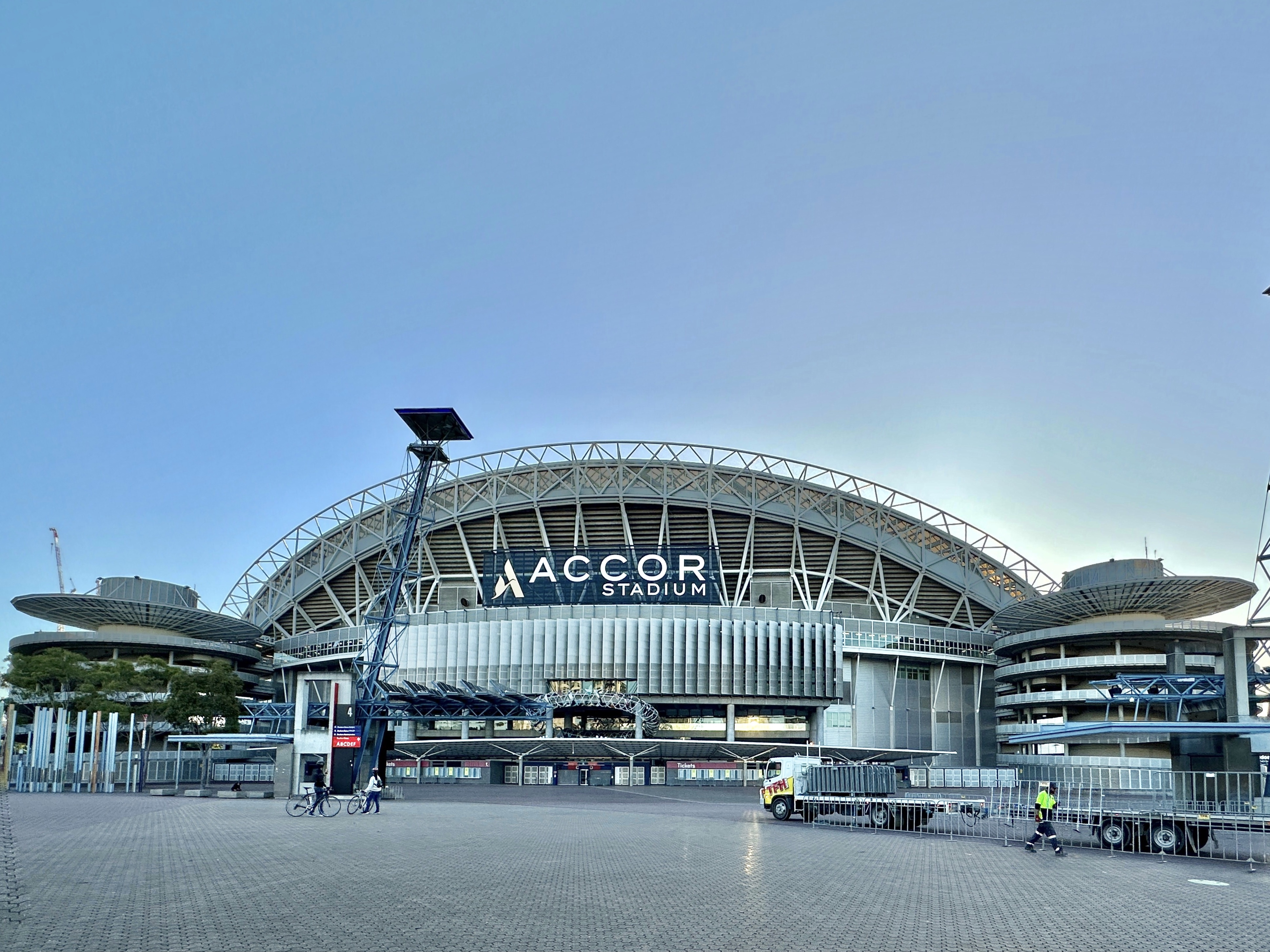
The main entrance to the stadium

On Saturday night of 23 August 2003, The AFL match Sydney Swans v Collingwood at the stadium set an attendance record for the largest crowd to watch an Australian rules football match outside Victoria with 72,393 spectators (87.7% capacity) attending and was the largest home-and-away AFL crowd at any Australian stadium for 2003. The attendance broke the record of 66,897 set at Football Park in Adelaide, South Australia on 28 September 1976 for the South Australian National Football League (SANFL) grand final between the Sturt and Port Adelaide Football Clubs.

2 October 2005 saw 82,453 attend the NRL grand final in which the Wests Tigers defeated the North Queensland Cowboys 30–16.

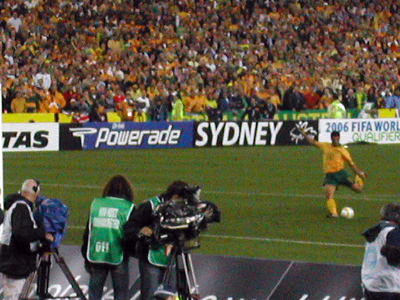
An intercontinental play-off against Uruguay held at Stadium Australia concluded with a penalty shootout that saw John Aloisi kick the decisive goal (pictured) which sent Australia to the 2006 FIFA World Cup in Germany.

16 November 2005 saw 82,698 attend the second leg of the Oceania-South America Qualification Playoff game for qualification to the 2006 FIFA World Cup. Australia defeated Uruguay 1–0, which led to a penalty shootout as Uruguay had won the first leg of the playoff 1–0. Australia won the shootout 4–2 and secured a spot in the World Cup for the first time since 1974. The penalty spot where John Aloisi's spot kick secured victory has been permanently preserved and is on public display at the stadium.

On 1 October 2006, the stadium hosted the 2006 NRL Grand Final between the Brisbane Broncos and Melbourne Storm. It was the first time since the competition began in 1908 that two teams from outside of Sydney had contested the grand final. 79,609 fans saw the Broncos defeat the Storm 15–8. As of the 2018 NRL Grand Final, this is one of three times that no Sydney based team has contested the premiership decider and also the only time an NRL grand final at the Olympic Stadium has failed to attract at least 80,000 fans.

On 5 October 2008, the Manly-Warringah Sea Eagles defeated the Melbourne Storm 40–0 in the 2008 NRL Grand Final in front of 80,388 fans. This is the record winning margin for a grand final, breaking the previous record of 38–0 when Eastern Suburbs defeated St George in the 1975 Grand Final played at the Sydney Cricket Ground. 2008 was the centenary year of the competition. It was also the first time a team had been held scoreless in a grand final since Manly had defeated Cronulla-Sutherland 16–0 in the 1978 Grand Final Replay at the SCG (the original Grand Final that year had been drawn 11–11).

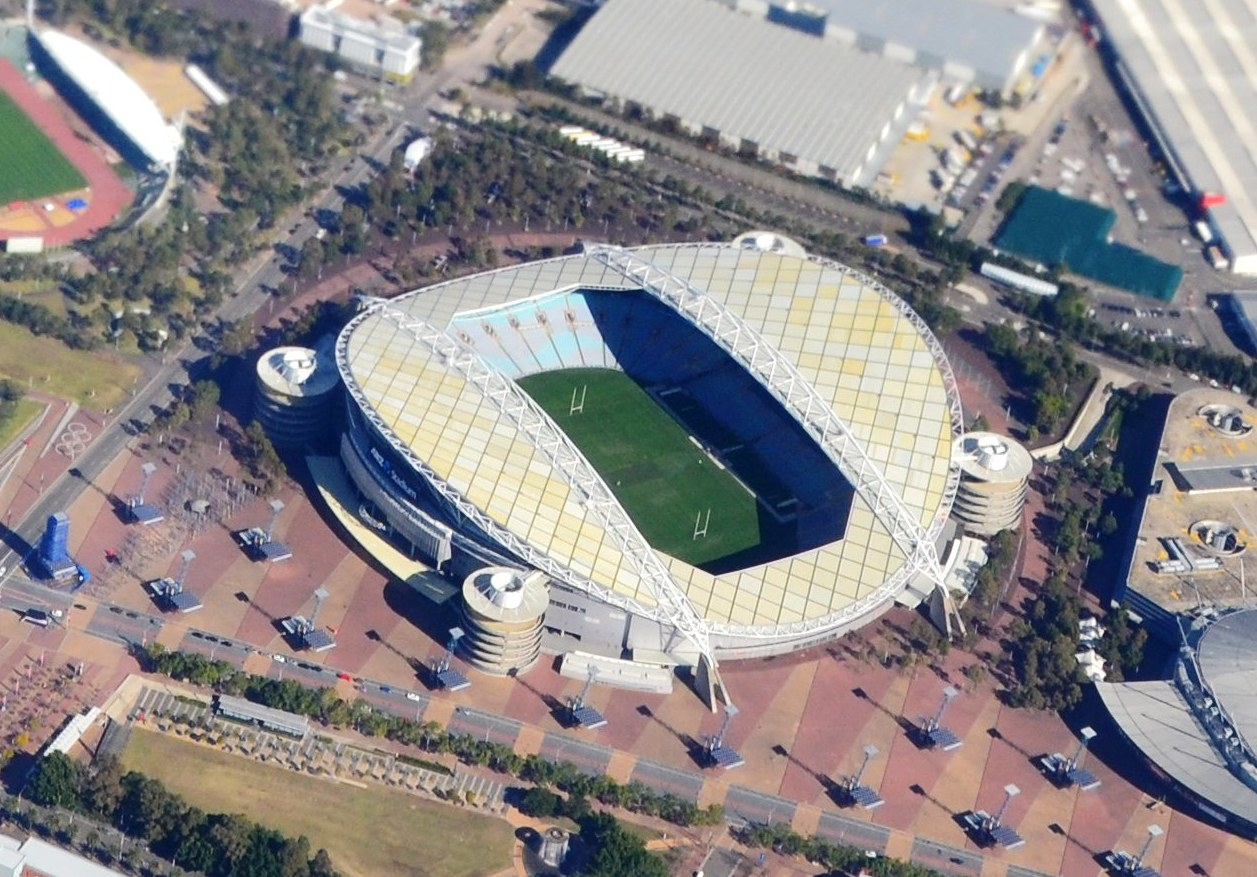
An aerial view of the stadium

In February 2009, the stadium replaced its existing two television screens with new Panasonic HD LED video screens that measure 23x10m – 70% larger than the original screens, and 50% larger than the screens in the Beijing National Stadium, while consuming less power than the old screens. Additionally, an LED perimeter screen showcasing ANZ advertising has been installed on the second level from the 30m line to the 30m line.

25 September 2009 saw the largest ever NRL finals attendance (non-grand final) in competition history when 74,549 fans saw the Parramatta Eels defeat the Bulldogs RLFC 22–12 in the preliminary final of the 2009 NRL season. This beat the previous finals record of 57,973 set at the Sydney Cricket Ground for the preliminary final of the 1963 NSWRFL season which St George defeat Parramatta 12–7.

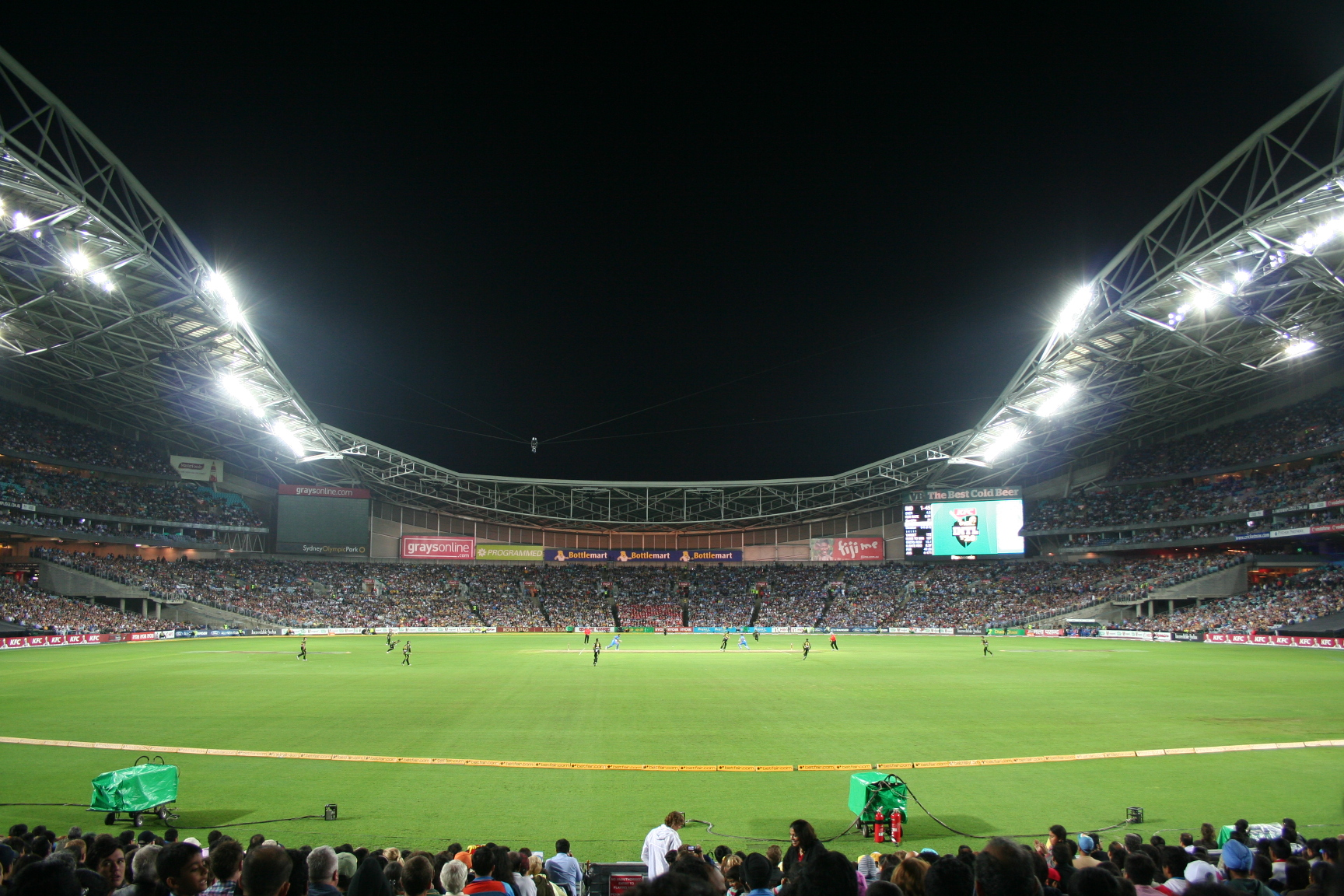
The stadium's first international cricket match, a Twenty20 International between Australia and India (pictured), took place in February 2012.

It hosted its first International Cricket match when Australia took on India in a Twenty20 night game on 1 February 2012. The match attracted a crowd of 59,569 which remains the largest crowd ever for a cricket match in New South Wales.

30 September 2012 saw the largest ever NRL Grand Final crowd since reconfiguration up until 2014 when 82,976 attended the 2012 NRL Grand Final to see the Melbourne Storm defeat the Canterbury-Bankstown Bulldogs 14–4. This number was nearly reached in the 2009 NRL Grand Final between the Storm and the Parramatta Eels, with 82,538 in attendance. On 13 and 14 December 2010, a U2 concert, one of the biggest in history, was held at the ANZ Stadium.

On 6 July 2013 a new rectangle configuration record attendance of 83,702 watched the British & Irish Lions defeat Australia 41–16 to win the Tom Richards Cup series by 2–1.

The record set by the Wallabies test was broken just 10 days later on 17 July when 83,813 (only 187 short of capacity) attended Game 3 of the 2013 State of Origin series. Queensland defeated NSW 12–10 to win their 8th straight Origin series. With 80,380 attending Game 1 at the stadium, the attendances also broke the Origin attendance records for the first and third game of a series. With the second game of the series attracting 51,690 to Brisbane's Suncorp Stadium, 2013 also broke the Origin series attendance record with 215,883 attending the three games.

On 6 September 2013, the largest ever NRL minor round attendance for a single game at the stadium was set when 59,708 saw eventual 2013 Premiers the Sydney Roosters defeat South Sydney 24–12 in the final round of the 2013 NRL season. This was also the largest single game minor round crowd in the history of the premiership dating back to 1908, breaking the previous record set at the ANZ Stadium in Brisbane (now known as the Queensland Sport and Athletics Centre) on 27 August 1993 when St George defeated Brisbane 16–10 in Round 22 of the 1993 NSWRL season in front of 58,593 fans. The record crowd stood until 18 April 2025, when 65,305 people attended the Good Friday clash between the Canterbury-Bankstown Bulldogs and South Sydney.

On 18 June 2014, 83,421 fans saw NSW defeat Qld 6–4 in Game 2 of the 2014 State of Origin series. After having won Game 1 at the Suncorp Stadium in Brisbane, the home side's win saw Queensland's eight year domination of Origin come to an end as New South Wales won their first series since 2005.

On 5 October 2014, a new post-reconfiguration attendance record of 83,833 saw South Sydney defeat Canterbury-Bankstown 30–6 in the 2014 NRL Grand Final. It was the Rabbitohs first grand final appearance and premiership win since 1971.

On 27 December 2014, a new domestic cricket record crowd for NSW was set with 32,823 attending the Sydney Derby between the Sydney Thunder and the Sydney Sixers. The crowd was the highest domestic cricket crowd in NSW history, only to be knocked off a few weeks later at the Sydney Cricket Ground involving the same two teams.

History was repeated on 4 October 2015 when for only the second time in the NRL's history, no NSW team was in the grand final and for the first time ever, it was a Queensland derby in the final between Brisbane and North Queensland. 82,758 people, many of whom had travelled down from various parts of Queensland, witnessed one of the all-time great grand finals when the game went into golden point time courtesy of a Kyle Feldt try in the dying moments to level the scores at 16 all. But the game would be remembered for Ben Hunt's dropped ball from the kick-off to extra time which led to Johnathan Thurston's field goal that gave North Queensland their first premiership in the NRL since being admitted into the competition in 1995. Apart from games involving national teams, the crowd is the largest ever in NSW not to involve a team based in the state.

On 30 September 2018, the Grand Final between the Sydney Roosters and the Melbourne Storm featured one of the best performances in Australian sporting history when Cooper Cronk, despite having a shoulder injury from the week before, playing for nearly the entire match, inspiring his Roosters to a famous 21–6 victory over his former club and at the same time denying the Storm back to back premierships.

On 6 October 2019, another notable NRL Grand Final was held with 82,922 people witnessing the Sydney Roosters become the first back to back premiers in the NRL since the Brisbane Broncos of 1992 and 1993, defeating the Canberra Raiders who were in their first Grand Final since 1994 in controversial circumstances. During the 2nd half with 10 minutes to go with scores locked at 8 all, referee Ben Cummins initially gave Canberra a new set of six tackles after he thought a Roosters player touched the ball, but then retracted the call as Canberra's Jack Wighton was tackled with the ball and ordered a handover to the Roosters with James Tedesco scoring the winning try for the Roosters shortly after the handover to win 14–8.

== Development ==
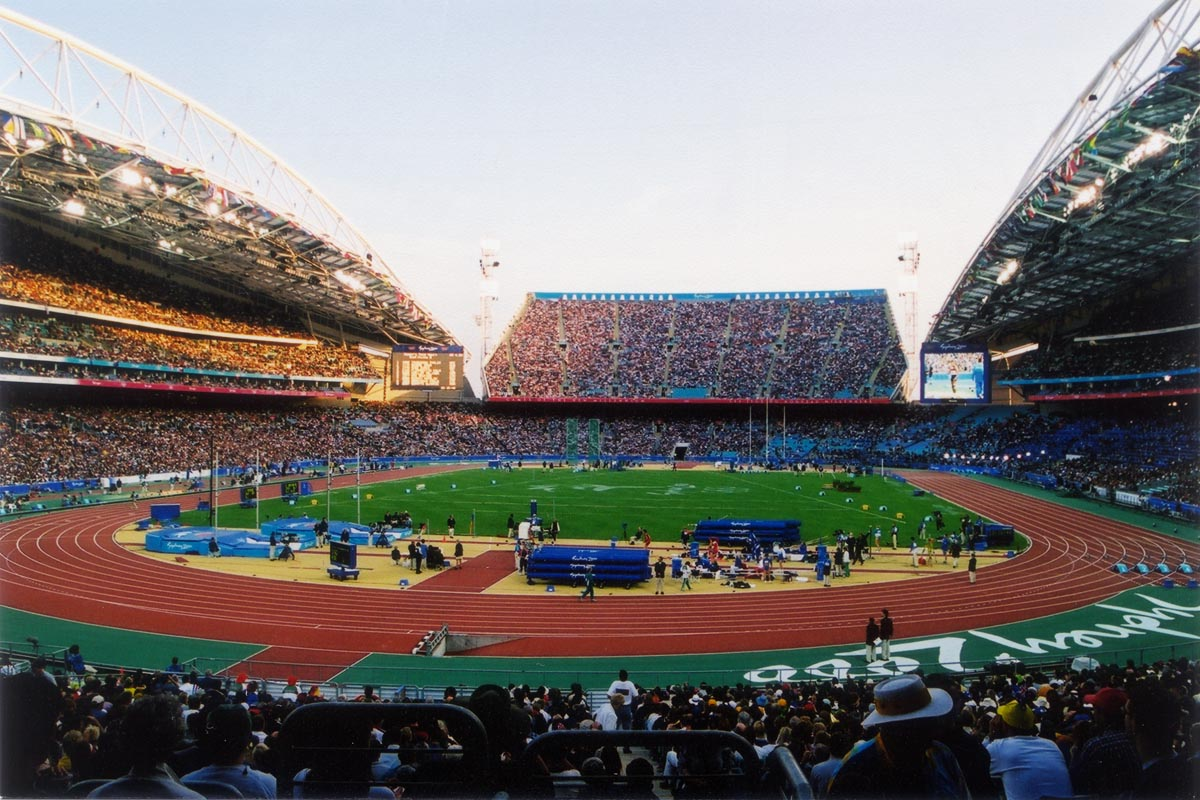
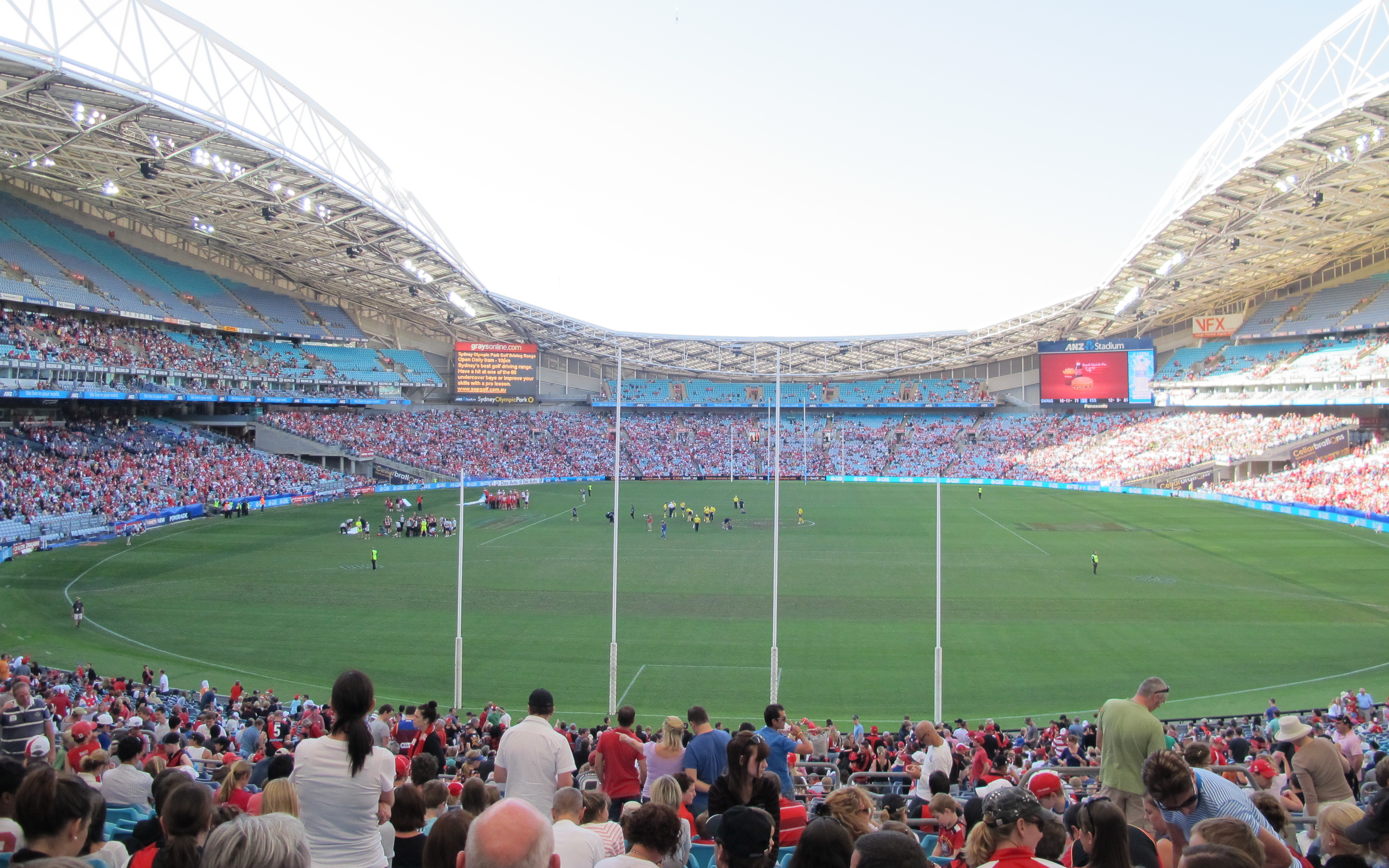
Following the Olympics, the north and south wing stands were replaced with roofs. The ability to retract the stands to accommodate Australian rules football and cricket matches was also added.

In October 2001, major reconfiguration work on the stadium was begun to allow cricket and Australian rules football, which require an oval field, to be played. The two wing stands and the athletics track were removed and replaced with movable seating sections. New roofs were built over the two ends and seats that had a poor view of the field were removed. The reconfiguration reduced the capacity to 84,000 for the rectangular field and 82,500 for the oval field at a total cost of $80 million. The construction work was carried out by Multiplex.

The reconfiguration work was completed in October 2003 in time for the 2003 Rugby World Cup, when the then Telstra Stadium hosted the opening game, two other groupsgames, both semi-finals, the third-place play-off and the final.

In 2022, a new scoreboard was installed at the southern end of the stadium, measuring 120 metres wide. Also in 2022, the stadium lighting was replaced with new LED sports lights and were first used in Game One of the 2022 State of Origin series.

In 2023, upgrades of the match day change rooms and media facilities were completed at a cost of $81.4 million ahead of the 2023 FIFA Women's World Cup and were first used for a NRL game between South Sydney and Manly Warringah on 25 March 2023.

== Proposed renovations ==
In September 2015, the New South Wales Government announced it intended to upgrade the stadium within the next decade, and install a retractable roof over the stadium.

On 23 November 2017, the New South Wales Government revealed that Stadium Australia would be knocked down and completely re-built, with a new 75,000 seat rectangular stadium built in its place. The announcement was made in conjunction with the unveiling of rebuilding plans for the Sydney Football Stadium in Moore Park. The original plan for Stadium Australia was for the demolition to start in 2019 and the new stadium to be completed by 2021.

On 29 March 2018 NSW Premier Gladys Berejiklian backflipped on the rebuilding plan, and revealed the government would instead refurbish Stadium Australia and reconfigure the pitch dimensions to a permanently rectangular shape. This would come at a cost of $800 million, compared to the knock-down and rebuild cost of $1.3 billion.

On 31 May 2020, the renovation plans were cancelled by the government, who pointed to a shift in budget priorities as a result of the ongoing COVID-19 pandemic. The decision meant the stadium remained capable of hosting oval-shaped sports such as cricket and Australian rules football, and retain its capacity to 83,500.

== Hall of fame ==
On 15 September 2025, the 25th anniversary of the opening of the Sydney Olympics, Stadium Australia announced the inaugural inductees to its hall of fame. The anniversary event included a performance from Nikki Webster who performed at the Olympic opening ceremony, singing with her children.

Year of Induction	Inductee
2025	(Australia) Cathy Freeman
2025	(Australia) Louise Sauvage
2025	(Australia) Tim Sullivan
2025	(Australia) Ian Thorpe
2025	(Australia) John Eales
2025	(England) Jonny Wilkinson
2025	(Australia) Brad Fittler
2025	(Australia) Andrew Johns
2025	(Australia) John Aloisi
2025	(Australia) Mark Schwarzer

== Naming rights ==
The stadium lacked a naming rights sponsor in its formative years, bearing the name Stadium Australia when it opened in 1999. In 2002, telecommunications company Telstra acquired the naming rights, resulting in the stadium being known as Telstra Stadium. On 12 December 2007 it was announced by the Stadium Australia Group (SAG) that the stadium's name was to be changed to ANZ Stadium after concluding a deal with ANZ Bank worth around A$31.5 million over seven years. This change took effect on 1 January 2008. In 2014, ANZ renewed the deal through to the end of 2017 and again until its closure for intended rebuilding in October 2019.

In December 2020, ANZ's naming rights to the stadium expired and it reverted to being Stadium Australia.

In November 2021, French multinational hospitality company Accor acquired the rights, with the venue to be known as Accor Stadium.

== Uses ==
Various sporting codes have used this ground on a regular basis. The National Rugby League is the most regular tenant of the ground, while rugby union internationals, soccer internationals and Australian rules football are all played at the ground. ANZ Stadium hosts the following:

=== Rugby league ===
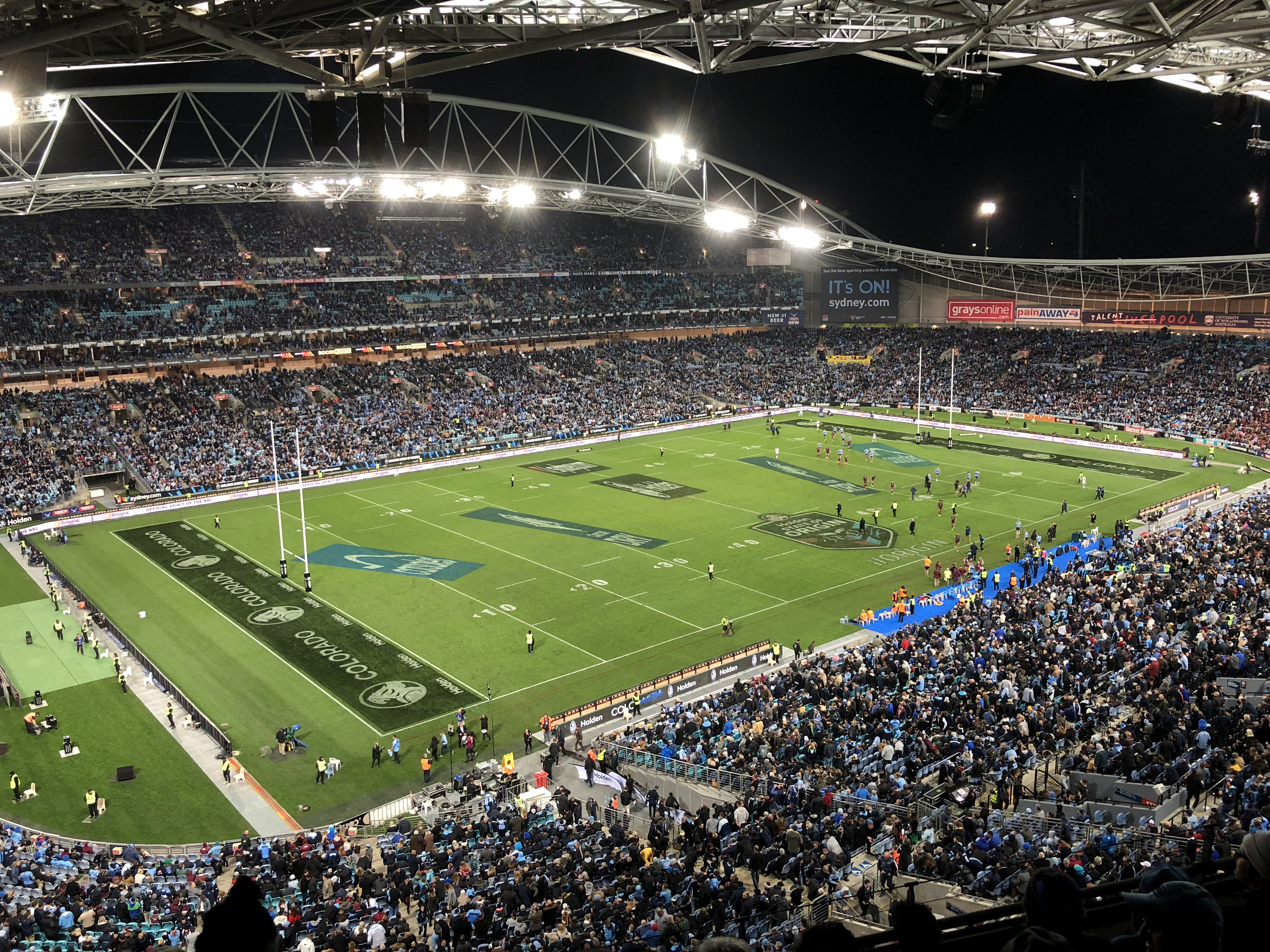
The stadium has hosted one of the three annual State of Origin games since the 1999 series.

- Two teams play the majority of their home games there: Canterbury-Bankstown Bulldogs (1999 to 2000 and again since 2006) and South Sydney Rabbitohs (since 2006). Between 2001 and 2005, Canterbury played selected home games at Stadium Australia, especially while their then home ground, the Sydney Showground Stadium was being used for the Royal Easter Show.
- The Parramatta Eels played two home games a year at Stadium Australia between 2008 and 2016. Parramatta then called the stadium their temporary home from 2017 until April 2019 while their regular home ground Parramatta Stadium was demolished; with the Western Sydney Stadium built in its place.
- The Wests Tigers now share the Western Sydney Stadium with Parramatta, using it as one of their three home grounds, having previously used the stadium between 2005–2008 and 2014–2018. For the 2021 and 2023 seasons, Stadium Australia was used as their home ground for Easter Monday home games against Parramatta.
- The St George Illawarra Dragons called Stadium Australia their Sydney home in 2008 while their home ground, Kogarah Oval was redeveloped, and again for 2 games a year between 2014 and 2017.
- All New South Wales home games of the State of Origin series are played at the stadium each year (either one or two annually since 1999), and every NRL Grand Final has been held there since 1999 with the exception of the 2021 NRL Grand Final, which was played at Lang Park, Brisbane due to ongoing COVID-19 lockdowns in New South Wales.
- The North Sydney Bears and Manly Warringah played at least one home game at Stadium Australia in its opening year.

=== Rugby union ===
- In October and November 2003, the stadium hosted seven matches in the 2003 Rugby World Cup. Among them were the opener on 10 October, which Australia won 24–8 against Argentina, both semifinals and the final on 22 November, which England won against Australia 20–17 following Jonny Wilkinson's 100th-minute drop goal to win their first Rugby World Cup.
- On 6 July 2013, the last test of the 2013 British & Irish Lions tour was played in the ANZ Stadium, with the Lions winning 41–16 to win the series.
- On 2 August 2014, the stadium played host to the Super Rugby Final between the New South Wales Waratahs and the Canterbury Crusaders. A record Super Rugby crowd of over 61,800 witnessed the Waratahs defeat the Crusaders in a thriller, 33–32.
- On 2 August 2025, the last test of the 2025 British & Irish Lions tour was played in the Accor Stadium, with Australia winning 22-12 to avoid a series whitewash.
- On 17 October 2026, the stadium host the second test of Bledisloe Cup 2026 where the New Zealand defeated Australia 43-21.

=== Cricket ===
- The Stadium has been approved as a ground for international cricket and has hosted Twenty20 Internationals.
- The Stadium was home to the Sydney Thunder franchise of the Big Bash League from 2011 to 2014. In June 2015, the Thunder announced they would leave ANZ Stadium and play all home games at Sydney Showground Stadium until the 2024–25 BBL season.
- It hosted its first International Cricket match when Australia took on India in a Twenty20 night game on 1 February 2012 and hosted its last T20 International in 2014.

=== Soccer ===
As the largest capacity stadium in Australia that can be configured for rectangular field sports, high-profile Australia national team (Socceroos) fixtures are often staged at the stadium. The stadium hosted Australia's 2005 shootout victory over Uruguay in the OFC-CONMEBOL intercontinental play-off, which qualified the Socceroos for the 2006 FIFA World Cup, their first appearance since 1974. Australia's extra time victory over South Korea in the 2015 AFC Asian Cup Final, which marked the Socceroos' first Asian Cup victory, also came at the stadium. Stadium Australia was also the venue for Australia's 3–1 victory against Honduras in the 2018 FIFA World Cup CONCACAF-AFC intercontinental play-off.

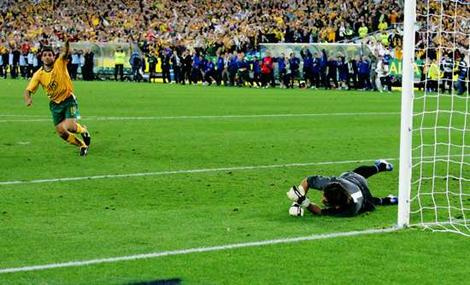
Stadium Australia held the second leg of the 2006 FIFA World Cup OFC-CONMEBOL intercontinental play-off, with John Aloisi scoring the decisive penalty to secure a 4–2 shootout victory.

The venue hosted the 2000 Olympics football gold medal match, with Cameroon defeating Spain 5–3 on penalties. The match attracted a crowd of 104,098, which remains the all-time largest attendance for an association football game in Australia.

Sydney FC have played a number of one-off exhibition matches at the stadium. Sydney FC defeated the Los Angeles Galaxy of MLS 5–3 in front of a crowd of 80,295 in 2007. The game was notable for including Galaxy legend and US international Landon Donovan and former England captain David Beckham, who had joined the Galaxy in 2007 and scored from a direct free kick during the game.

The local A-League teams, Sydney FC and Western Sydney Wanderers, have also hosted a number of English Premier League teams. Chelsea defeated Sydney FC 1–0 in front of a crowd of 83,598 on 2 June 2015, the largest crowd for a soccer game at the stadium since the post-Olympics reconfiguration in 2002. Everton defeated Sydney FC 1–0 in front of a crowd of 40,466 in 2010. Tottenham Hotspur defeated Sydney FC 1–0 in front of a crowd of over 71,500 on 30 May 2015. The stadium hosted two exhibition matches in 2017: Liverpool defeated Sydney FC 3–0 in front of a crowd of 72,892 on 24 May 2017, while on 13 July 2017, Arsenal defeated Sydney FC 2–0 in front of a crowd of 80,432. Arsenal would play Western Sydney Wanderers in the stadium two days later, with the English side winning 3–1 in front of a crowd of 83,221.

The A-League All Stars have also played a number of one-off exhibition matches at the stadium. Premier League side Manchester United defeated the A-League All Stars 5-1 in front of a crowd of 83,127 on 20 July 2013. Italian Serie A side Juventus defeated the A-League All Stars 3-2 in front of a crowd of 55,364 on 10 August 2014. The game was also notable for Juventus legend Alessandro Del Piero, at the time with Sydney FC, playing against his old club for the first time. In 2022, the venue hosted FC Barcelona, who featured in a 3-2 victory against the All Stars.

Stadium Australia also hosts a smaller number of domestic A-League matches when the need arises. Sydney FC hosted an A-League home game on 9 January 2016 against Newcastle Jets at this ground. Western Sydney Wanderers used the stadium as well as Sydney Showground Stadium as their home grounds while Pirtek Stadium was demolished and replaced by Western Sydney Stadium. On 8 October 2016, the opening round of the 2016–17 A-League season attracted a crowd of 61,880 for the Sydney Derby, with Sydney FC prevailing 4–0. That game remains as the highest-ever crowd figure for an A-League match.

==== 2015 AFC Asian Cup ====
The stadium hosted seven games of the 2015 AFC Asian Cup, including the final.

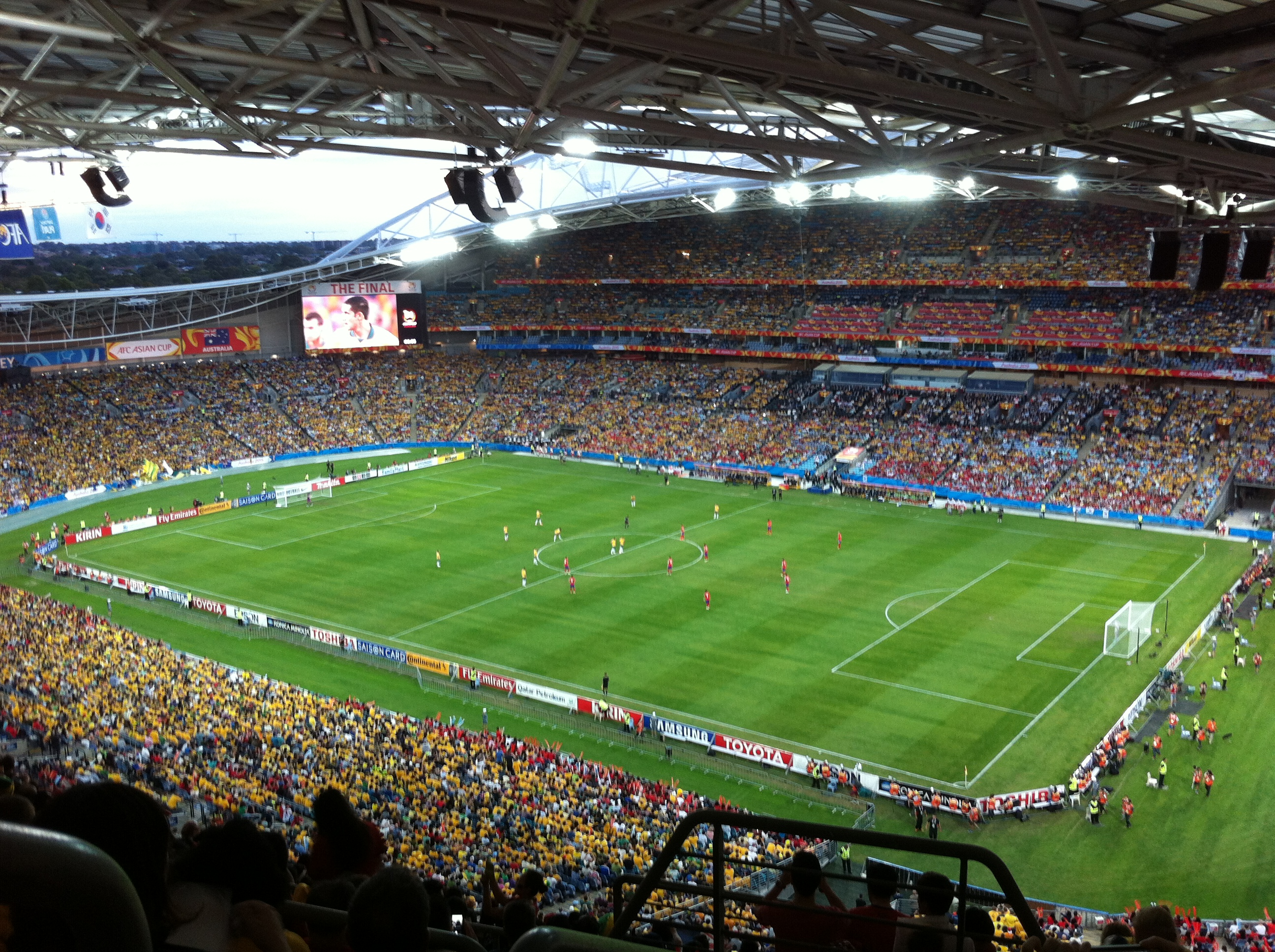
The 2015 AFC Asian Cup final (pictured) was held at Stadium Australia, along with six other matches during the tournament.

Date	Team #1	Res.	Team #2	Stage	Attendance
10 January 2015	Uzbekistan	1–0	North Korea	Group B	12,078
13 January 2015	Oman	0–4	Australia	Group A	50,276
15 January 2015	Qatar	0–1	Iran	Group C	22,672
19 January 2015	Qatar	1–2	Bahrain	Group C	4,841
23 January 2015	Japan	1–1 (4–5 pen.)	United Arab Emirates	Quarter-finals	19,094
26 January 2015	South Korea	2–0	Iraq	Semi-finals	36,053
31 January 2015	South Korea	1–2 (a.e.t.)	Australia	Final	76,385

==== 2023 FIFA Women's World Cup ====
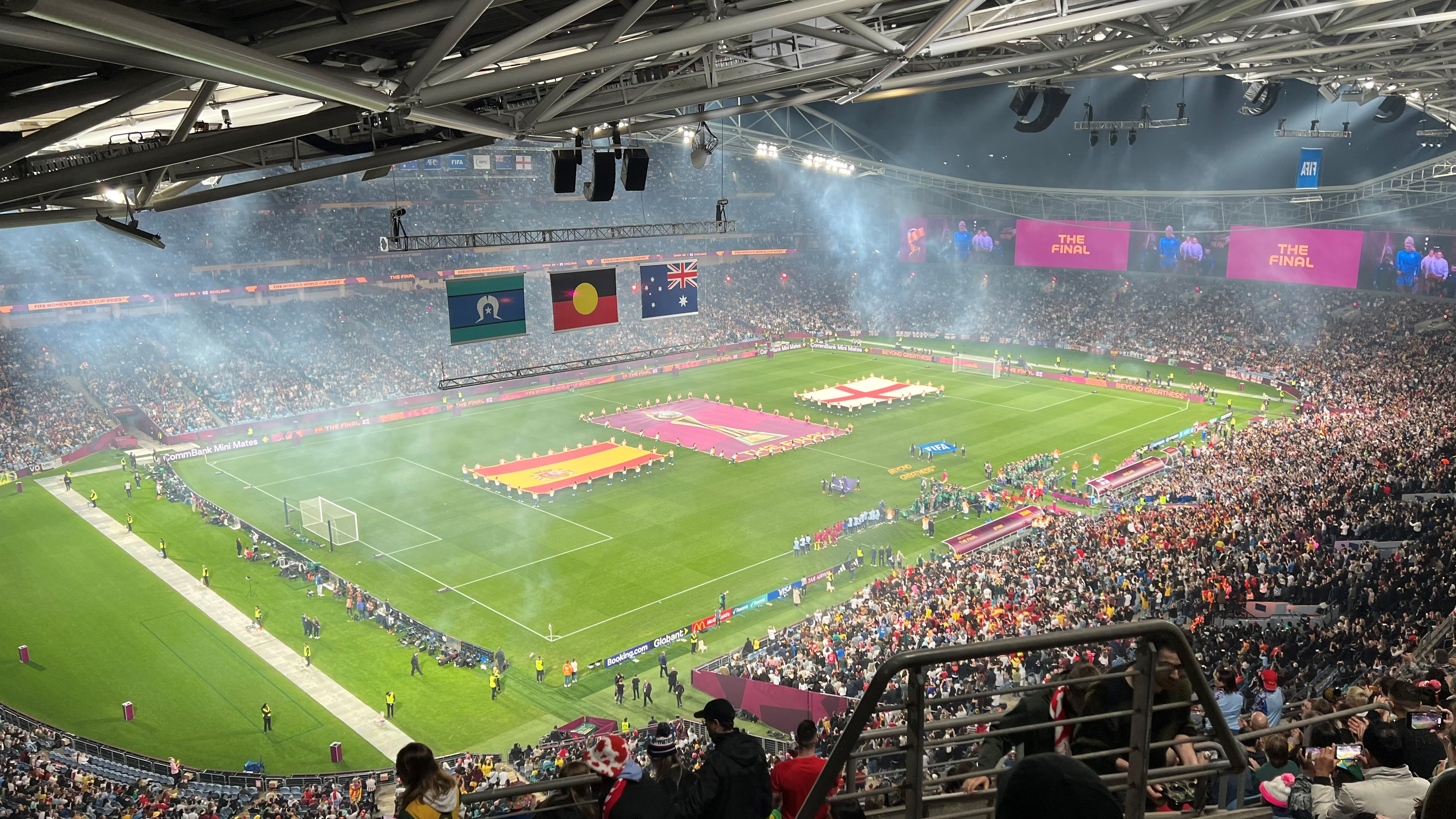
Stadium Australia hosted the 2023 FIFA Women's World Cup final, with Spain defeating England 1–0 before a crowd of 75,784.

The stadium hosted the opening match for the Australian half of the 2023 FIFA Women's World Cup. Hosts Australia took on Republic of Ireland and won 1–0 from Steph Catley's converted penalty. The stadium also hosted four knock-out matches of the 2023 FIFA Women's World Cup, including the final between Spain and England.

Date	Team #1	Res.	Team #2	Stage	Attendance
21 July 2023	Australia	1–0	Republic of Ireland	Group B	75,784
7 August 2023	Australia	2–0	Denmark	Round of 16	75,784
12 August 2023	England	2–1	Colombia	Quarter-final	75,784
16 August 2023	Australia	1–3	England	Semi-final	75,784
20 August 2023	Spain	1–0	England	Final	75,784

==== 2026 AFC Women's Asian Cup ====
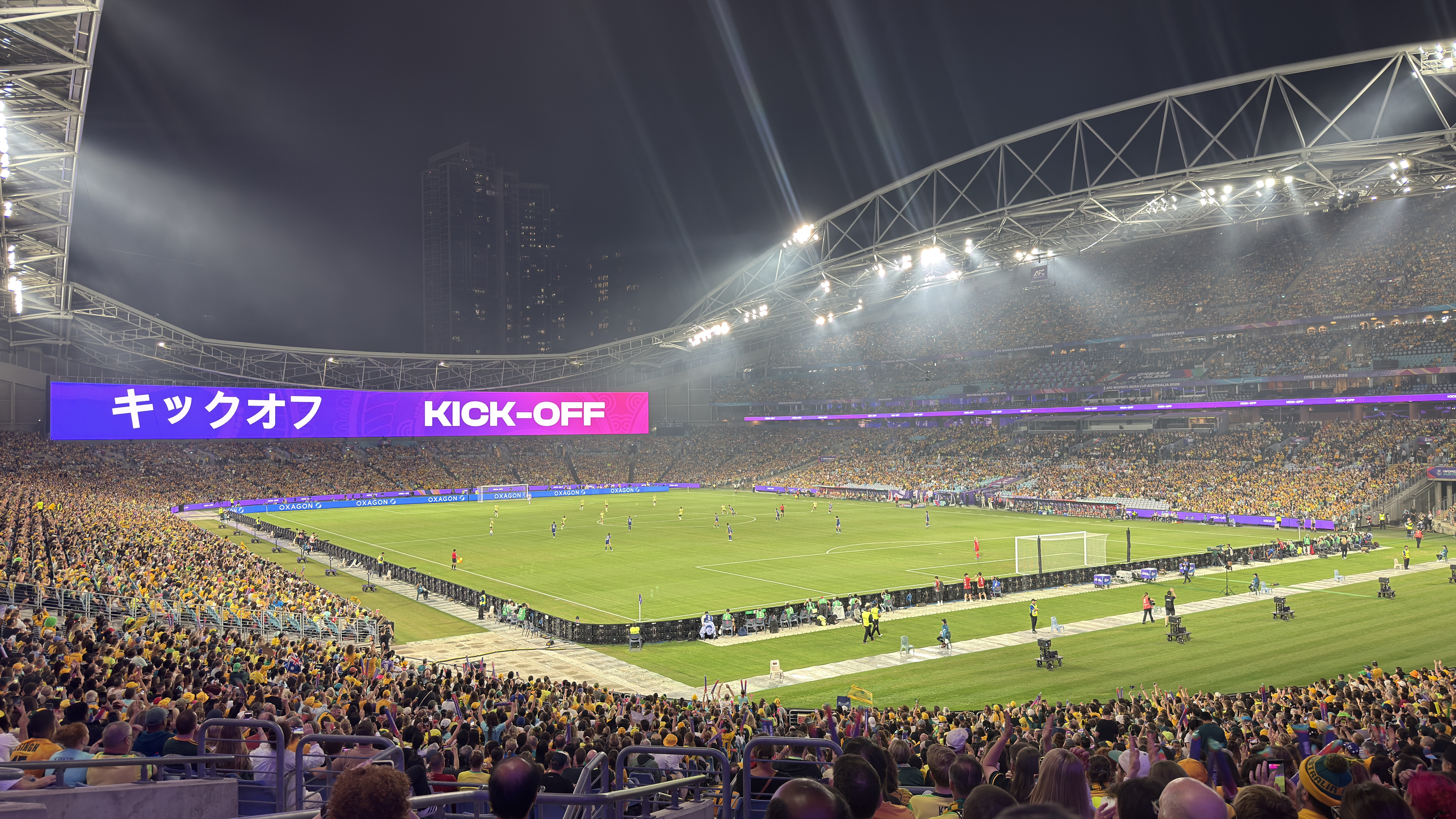
Stadium Australia hosted the 2026 AFC Women's Asian Cup final, with Japan defeating hosts Australia 1–0 before a crowd of 74,397.

Date	Team #1	Res.	Team #2	Stage	Attendance
8 March 2026	Australia	3–3	South Korea	Group A	60,279
14 March 2026	South Korea	6–0	Uzbekistan	Quarter-finals	12,974
15 March 2026	Japan	7–0	Philippines	Quarter-finals	13,321
18 March 2026	South Korea	1–4	Japan	Semi-finals	17,367
21 March 2026	Japan	1–0	Australia	Final	74,397

The stadium is expected to host several games of the 2032 Summer Olympics, including a quarter-final match.

=== Australian rules football ===
- All home Australian Football League finals hosted by the Sydney Swans were played at this ground between 2003 and 2016, except for one in 2005 due to the stadium being unavailable. The first three Sydney Derbies were also played at the venue, however, the Swans home game moved to the Sydney Cricket Ground in 2013 and the Giants home game moved to Sydney Showground Stadium in 2014.
- The Sydney Swans played up to three "blockbuster" games at the venue each season between 2002 and 2015, with their remaining eight home games played at the Sydney Cricket Ground (SCG). As of 2016, the Swans no longer play at Stadium Australia, with all of their home games moving back to the Sydney Cricket Ground on a full-time basis.
- The Greater Western Sydney Giants has Accor Stadium as an option for home games when the Sydney Showground Stadium, their primary home ground, is unavailable. In 2022, Australian rules football returned to the ground for a round one match between the Giants and Sydney Swans. This was the first Australian rules football match to be played at the venue since September 2016, and the first sporting event to be played with a new 120 metre-long scoreboard installed at the stadium's southern end.
- The Swans shifted all home games in 2016 to the SCG, including its three scheduled games at ANZ Stadium. However, the stadium did host a qualifying final derby between the Sydney Swans and Greater Western Sydney Giants on 10 September 2016. A crowd of 60,222 attended the match, the highest attendance for an Australian rules football match in New South Wales since 2007.

=== Motorsports ===
On 26 October 2002, Stadium Australia played host to Motorcycle speedway with the Speedway Grand Prix of Australia, the 10th and final round of the 2002 Speedway Grand Prix World Championship series. A temporary 400 metres (440 yards) long track was used with American rider Greg Hancock winning the GP from England's Scott Nicholls and Australia's own future triple World Champion Jason Crump whose third place was enough to lift him to third in the championship standings above fellow Aussie Ryan Sullivan. Also representing Australia at the meeting were Leigh Adams who finished 4th in the World Championship, and meeting wildcard riders Jason Lyons and Mick Poole. The event attracted approximately 31,500 fans.

Stadium Australia played host to the first-ever Monster Jam Australia event in 2013, and remains the only venue to feature on all four Australian tours as of 2016. The 2025 Race of Champions was held at the venue in March 2025. It was the first time the event has been hosted in the Southern Hemisphere.

=== American football ===
Stadium Australia hosted the American Bowl on 7 August 1999 between the Denver Broncos and the San Diego Chargers. This was the first professional American football game to be held in the Southern Hemisphere.

On 27 August 2016, the stadium hosted the Sydney Cup—a season-opening 2016 NCAA Division I FBS college football game between the California Golden Bears and the Hawaii Rainbow Warriors, where California defeated Hawaii 51–31.

=== Concerts ===
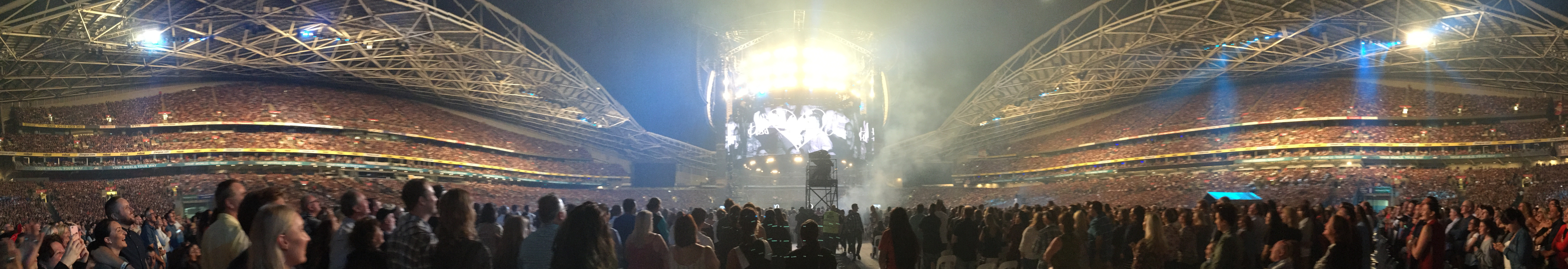
Two Adele Live 2017 concerts took place at Stadium Australia in March 2017. The second concert on 11 March (pictured) set the venue's post-reconfiguration attendance record of 98,364.

- The Bee Gees, consisting of Barry, Robin and Maurice Gibb, played the first concert at the stadium on 27 March 1999. The show was sold out with an attendance of 66,285.
- Australian rock band AC/DC played 3 shows in February 2010 (18th, 20th & 22nd) as part of their Black Ice World Tour, supported by Wolfmother. Respectively the shows had an attendance of 70,282, 75,867 and 66,896. The band returned to play 2 shows in November 2015 (4th & 7th) as part of the Rock or Bust World Tour, supported by The Hives and Kingswood, and are scheduled to return once again for 2 shows in November 2025 (21st & 25th) as part of the Power Up Tour, supported by Amyl and the Sniffers.
- Irish rock band U2 performed at the stadium on 10, 11 and 13 November 2006 to a combined attendance of 206,568 people, as part of their Vertigo Tour. They returned 13 and 14 December 2010 to a combined attendance of 107,155 people, as part of their U2 360° Tour.
- US rock band Bon Jovi performed at the stadium on 14 December 2013 as part of their Because We Can Tour. The show was sold out with a crowd of 60,510 and it was the biggest concert at the stadium since U2 in 2010. Kid Rock was the opening act.
- Rapper Eminem performed at the stadium on 22 February 2014 as part of his Rapture Tour. The show was sold out with an attendance of 53,649 people. He returned to the stadium on 22 February 2019, exactly 5 years later.
- American singer-songwriter Taylor Swift performed at the stadium on 28 November 2015 as part of the 1989 World Tour, playing to a sold-out crowd of 75,980 people. She also filmed the tour’s accompanying film during that show. Swift returned to the stadium on 2 November 2018 as part of her Reputation Stadium Tour, then on 23–26 February 2024 as part of her Eras Tour, which made her the first solo musician to perform four consecutive shows at the stadium.
- American rock band Guns N' Roses performed at the stadium on 10 and 11 February 2017 to a combined attendance of 84,277 people, as part of their Not in This Lifetime... Tour. The band returned to perform on 27 November 2022, as part of their 2020 Tour.
- English singer-songwriter Adele performed at the stadium on 10 and 11 March 2017, as part of Adele Live 2017. The singer played to a total of 200,000 people, making her two concerts the highest attended concerts in the history of the stadium. This is the largest audience the venue has seen since the 2000 Sydney Olympics, breaking Taylor Swift's 2015 record of 75,980 audience members.
- Canadian singer Justin Bieber performed at the stadium on 15 March 2017 to an attendance of 65,836 people, as part of his Purpose World Tour.
- Foo Fighters performed at the stadium on 27 January 2018, to 71,314 people, as a part of their Concrete and Gold Tour. The band was scheduled to return on 12 December 2022, but the concert was cancelled in March of that year in light of drummer Taylor Hawkins' death. They returned to perform on 9 December 2023 and will again return to perform on 10 November 2026 as part of their Take Cover Tour.
- English singer-songwriter Ed Sheeran performed at the stadium on 15, 16 and 17 March 2018, to an attendance of 243,513 over the three nights, as part of his ÷ Tour. He returned to perform on 24 and 25 February 2023, as part of his +–=÷x (Mathematics) Tour, and will again return on 13 and 14 February 2026, as part of the Loop Tour.
- Queen + Adam Lambert performed at the stadium on 15 February 2020 as part of their Rhapsody Tour.
- On Sunday, 16 February 2020 the fund raising concert Fire Fight Australia was held which included live performances by Lee Kernaghan, Conrad Sewell, Baker Boy, Daryl Braithwaite, Pete Murray, Grinspoon, Jessica Mauboy, Illy, Guy Sebastian, Peking Duk, Delta Goodrem, Ronan Keating, Tina Arena, Alice Cooper, Amy Shark, 5 Seconds of Summer, Queen + Adam Lambert performing the same set as their Live Aid performance, Michael Bublé (Live cross from Rod Laver Arena), Hilltop Hoods (with Illy, Ecca Vandal, Adrian Eagle), and Montaigne), k.d. lang, Icehouse + William Barton and John Farnham + Olivia Newton-John and joined on stage for You're The Voice by Mitch Tambo, William Barton, and Queen's Brian May. The event was hosted by comedian Celeste Barber and broadcast on television by the Seven Network and FOX8, and was later noteworthy for being Newton-John's final performance before her death in August 2022.
- American rock band Red Hot Chili Peppers performed at the stadium on 2 February 2023, supported by Post Malone, as part of their 2022 Global Stadium Tour.
- English singer-songwriter Harry Styles performed at the stadium on 3 and 4 March 2023, supported by Wet Leg, as part of his final performance for Love On Tour in Australia. He is scheduled to return on 12 & 13 December 2026, supported by Skye Newman and Baby J as part of his Together, Together tour.
- American rock band Kiss performed at the stadium on 7 October 2023, supported by Weezer and Regurgitator, as part of their End of the Road World Tour. It was the band's final Australian performance.
- Canadian singer-songwriter The Weeknd was supposed to play there on 24, 25 and 27 November 2023, as part of his After Hours til Dawn Tour, but instead performed on the 22nd and 23rd of October 2024. He was supported by Anna Lunoe, Mike Dean and Chxrry22.
- American singer-songwriter Pink performed at the stadium on 16 March 2024, supported by Tones and I, as part of the Oceania leg of her Summer Carnival tour.
- British rock band Coldplay performed at the stadium on 6, 7, 9 and 10 November 2024 as part of their Music of the Spheres World Tour. They were the first group to perform at the Accor Stadium four times on a single tour, breaking the record for most attended event of all time at the venue with 338,776 people.
- American country singer-songwriter Luke Combs performed at the stadium on 31 January and 1 February 2025, supported by Jordan Davis, Mitchell Tenpenny and Lane Pittman.
- Taiwanese rock band Mayday performed at the stadium on 22 February 2025, as part of their #5525 Live Tour.
- British rock band Oasis performed at the stadium on 7 and 8 November 2025, with support from Ball Park Music, as part of their Live '25 Tour.
- American metal band Metallica performed at the stadium on 15 November 2025, supported by Evanescence and Suicidal Tendencies, as part of their M72 World Tour.
- American singer Lady Gaga performed at the stadium on 12 and 13 December 2025, as part of her Mayhem Ball.
- GaliaBeats hosted a charity concert early 2026.
- British singer Robbie Williams will perform at the stadium on 14 November 2026, as part of the Britpop Tour, supported by G Flip and the Lottery Winners.
- Armenian-American metal band System of a Down and American rock band Faith No More will perform at the stadium as part of a co-headlining tour on January 22, 2027.
- Korean boy band BTS will perform at the stadium on 20 and 21 February 2027, as part of the Arirang World Tour.

== Attendance records ==
	Before reconfiguration	After reconfiguration	
	Before reconfiguration	Oval shape	Rectangular shape
Stadium capacity	115,000	82,500	84,000
Overall	114,714; Closing ceremony (Sydney 2000 Olympics); 1 October 2000	85,000; Ed Sheeran +–=÷× Tour; 24 February 2023	98,364; Adele; Adele Live 2017; 11 March 2017
Athletics	112,524; Sydney 2000 Olympics; 25 September 2000	—N/a	—N/a
Rugby league (State Of Origin)	88,336; New South Wales v Queensland (1999 State of Origin series); 9 June 1999	—N/a	83,813; New South Wales v Queensland (2013 State of Origin series); 17 July 2013
Rugby league (premiership)	107,999; St George Illawarra v Melbourne; 1999 NRL Grand Final; 26 September 1999	—N/a	83,833; South Sydney Rabbitohs v Canterbury-Bankstown Bulldogs; 2014 NRL Grand Final; 5 October 2014
Rugby union	109,874; Australia v New Zealand (2000 Tri Nations Series); 15 July 2000	—N/a	83,702; Australia v British & Irish Lions (2013 British & Irish Lions tour to Australia); 6 July 2013
Australian rules football (all matches)	—N/a	72,393; Sydney v Collingwood (2003 AFL season); 23 August 2003	—N/a
International soccer	104,098; Spain v Cameroon (Sydney 2000 Olympics; Men's Football Final); 30 September 2000	—N/a	82,698; Australia v Uruguay (2006 FIFA World Cup qualification); 16 November 2005
Club soccer	—N/a	—N/a	83,598; Sydney FC v Chelsea; 2 June 2015
International cricket	—N/a	59,569; Australia v India; T20 International; 1 February 2012	—N/a
Domestic cricket	—N/a	32,823; Sydney Thunder v Sydney Sixers (2014-15 Big Bash League); 27 December 2014	—N/a
Australian rules football (finals)	—N/a	71,019; Sydney v Brisbane; 2003 AFL Preliminary Final; 20 September 2003	—N/a
American football	73,811; Denver Broncos v San Diego Chargers; 1999 American Bowl; 8 August 1999	—N/a	61,247; California Golden Bears v Hawaii Rainbow Warriors; 2016 NCAA Division I FBS football season 27 August 2016
Motorcycle speedway	—N/a	—N/a	31,500; Speedway Grand Prix of Australia; 2002 Speedway Grand Prix; 26 October 2002
Concerts	66,285; Bee Gees; The One Night Only Tour; 27 March 1999	85,000; Ed Sheeran +–=÷× Tour; 24 February 2023	98,364; Adele; Adele Live 2017; 11 March 2017

== See also ==
- 2000 Summer Olympics venues
- List of sports venues in Australia
- List of national stadiums
- List of rugby league stadiums by capacity
- List of stadiums in Oceania

Preceded by Sydney Football Stadium; Moore Park	National Rugby League; Grand final venue 1999–present	Succeeded by incumbent
Preceded by Centennial Olympic Stadium; Atlanta	Summer Olympics; Opening and Closing Ceremonies (Sydney Olympic Stadium); 2000	Succeeded by Olympic Stadium; Athens
Preceded by Sanford Stadium; Athens, Georgia	Summer Olympics; Football Men's Finals (Sydney Olympic Stadium); 2000	Succeeded by Olympic Stadium; Athens
Preceded by Centennial Olympic Stadium; Atlanta	Olympic Athletics competitions Main Venue; 2000	Succeeded by Olympic Stadium; Athens
Preceded by Millennium Stadium; Cardiff	Rugby World Cup; Final Venue; 2003	Succeeded by Stade de France; Saint-Denis
Preceded by Khalifa International Stadium; Doha	AFC Asian Cup; Final Venue; 2015	Succeeded by Zayed Sports City Stadium; Abu Dhabi
Preceded by Parc Olympique Lyonnais; Lyon	FIFA Women's World Cup; Final venue 2023	Succeeded by TBA
