= NRL Good Friday Game =

Annual rugby league game in Australia

- Location: Stadium Australia, Sydney, New South Wales
- Teams: Canterbury-Bankstown Bulldogs; South Sydney Rabbitohs
- First meeting: 6 April 2012; South Sydney 20 def. Canterbury-Bankstown 10
- Latest meeting: 3 April 2026; South Sydney 32 def. Canterbury-Bankstown 24
- Next meeting: 26 March 2027
- Broadcasters: Fox League, Channel 9

Statistics
- Most wins: South Sydney; 10 wins
- Largest victory: South-Sydney; 38 points (2 April 2021)

The National Rugby League's Good Friday Game is held annually on the Good Friday holiday in Australia between the South Sydney Rabbitohs and Canterbury-Bankstown Bulldogs. It is traditionally played at Stadium Australia.

In 2014, it took a Trent Hodkinson field goal in the 78th minute to gift the Canterbury-Bankstown Bulldogs the win 15-14. In the 2015 match, dubbed 'Bad Friday', a controversial finish to the match ended with a penalty being awarded against James Graham of Canterbury-Bankstown, allowing South Sydney to score a winning penalty goal.

This led to arguments between Canterbury players and referee Gerard Sutton, with David Klemmer being sin binned for dissent. Canterbury-Bankstown supporters then threw objects at the referees as they were escorted swiftly of the field straight after full-time. In 2020, due to the COVID-19 pandemic in Australia, the NRL season was postponed meaning the match did not go ahead.

In round 4 of the 2021 NRL season, South Sydney recorded the biggest winning margin in the fixture defeating Canterbury-Bankstown 38-0. In round 6 of the 2023 NRL season, South Sydney recorded the most points scored by a winning team in the Good Friday game as they defeated Canterbury 50-16.

== Head to head ==
Team	Played	Games won	Draws	Games lost	Points For	Points Against	Point Difference
Canterbury-Bankstown Bulldogs	14	4	0	10	218	301	-83
South Sydney Rabbitohs	14	10	0	4	301	218	+83

== Results ==
Date	Home team	Score	Away team	Venue	Crowd	Reference
6 April 2012	South Sydney Rabbitohs	20–10	Canterbury-Bankstown Bulldogs	ANZ Stadium, Sydney	35,221	
29 March 2013	Canterbury-Bankstown Bulldogs	12–17	South Sydney Rabbitohs	ANZ Stadium, Sydney	51,686	
18 April 2014	South Sydney Rabbitohs	14–15	Canterbury-Bankstown Bulldogs	ANZ Stadium, Sydney	43,255	
3 April 2015	Canterbury-Bankstown Bulldogs	17–18	South Sydney Rabbitohs	ANZ Stadium, Sydney	40,523	
25 March 2016	South Sydney Rabbitohs	12–42	Canterbury-Bankstown Bulldogs	ANZ Stadium, Sydney	38,192	
14 April 2017	Canterbury-Bankstown Bulldogs	24–9	South Sydney Rabbitohs	ANZ Stadium, Sydney	35,984	
30 March 2018	South Sydney Rabbitohs	20–16	Canterbury-Bankstown Bulldogs	ANZ Stadium, Sydney	32,471	
19 April 2019	Canterbury-Bankstown Bulldogs	6–14	South Sydney Rabbitohs	ANZ Stadium, Sydney	30,040	
2 April 2021	Canterbury-Bankstown Bulldogs	0–38	South Sydney Rabbitohs	Stadium Australia, Sydney	23,240	
15 April 2022	South Sydney Rabbitohs	36–16	Canterbury-Bankstown Bulldogs	Accor Stadium, Sydney	30,194	
7 April 2023	Canterbury-Bankstown Bulldogs	16–50	South Sydney Rabbitohs	Accor Stadium, Sydney	35,211	
29 March 2024	South Sydney Rabbitohs	20–16	Canterbury-Bankstown Bulldogs	Accor Stadium, Sydney	35,275	
18 April 2025	Canterbury-Bankstown Bulldogs	32–0	South Sydney Rabbitohs	Accor Stadium, Sydney	65,305	
3 April 2026	South Sydney Rabbitohs	32–24	Canterbury-Bankstown Bulldogs	Accor Stadium, Sydney	49,813	

- 2020 NRL Good Friday Game cancelled due to COVID-19 lockdown
