= K League =

Association football league in South Korea

- Organising body: Korea Football Association (1983–1986); K League Federation (1987–1988); Korea Football Association (1989–1994); K League Federation (1994–present)
- Founded: 1983
- Country: South Korea
- Confederation: AFC
- Divisions: K League 1 K League 2
- Number of clubs: 29
- Level on pyramid: 1–2
- Domestic cup(s): Korea Cup; K League Super Cup
- International cup(s): AFC Champions League Elite; AFC Champions League Two
- Current champions: FC Seoul (2026)
- Most championships: Jeonbuk Hyundai Motors (10 titles)
- Most appearances: Kim Byung-ji (708) (Note: Includes statistics in the Korean League Cup and the K League Championship.)
- Top scorer: Lee Dong-gook (228)
- Broadcasters: JTBC Golf&Sports; Sky Sports (South Korea); IB Sports
- Website: www.kleague.com
- Current: 2026 K League 1; 2026 K League 2

K League (Korean: K리그) is South Korea's professional football league. It includes the first division K League 1 and the second division K League 2. Clubs competing in the K League have won a record total of twelve AFC Champions League titles, the top continental competition for Asian clubs.

== History ==
Until the 1970s, South Korean football operated two major football leagues, the National Semi-professional Football League and the National University Football League, but these were not professional leagues, and footballers could not focus solely on football. In 1979, however, the Korea Football Association (KFA) president Choi Soon-young planned to establish a professional football league, and founded South Korea's first professional football club, Hallelujah FC, the following year. After the South Korean professional baseball league KBO League was founded in 1982, the KFA was aware of crisis about the popularity of football. In 1983, it urgently founded the Korean Super League with two professional clubs (Hallelujah FC, Yukong Elephants) and three semi-professional clubs (POSCO Dolphins, Daewoo Royals, Kookmin Bank) to professionalize South Korean football. Then, the Super League accomplished its purpose after existing clubs were also converted into professional clubs (POSCO Atoms, Daewoo Royals) and new professional clubs joined the league. In its early years, it also used a promotion system by granting qualification to the semi-professional League winners. (Hanil Bank in 1984, Sangmu FC in 1985)

However, the number of spectators consistently decreased despite KFA's effort, and so the professional league, renamed as the Korean Professional Football League, operated a home-and-away system to interest fans since 1987. On 30 July 1994, the Professional League Committee under KFA was independent of the association, and renamed as the "Korean Professional Football Federation". In 1996, the South Korean government and the Football Federation introduced a decentralization policy to proliferate the popularity of football nationally in preparation for the 2002 FIFA World Cup, which they wanted to host. Several clubs located in the capital Seoul moved to other cities according to the new policy, but this was abolished after only three years and is regarded as a failed policy because it gave up the most populous city in South Korea. In 1998, the league was renamed again as current K League.

The league adopted its current format by abolishing the K League Championship and the Korean League Cup after the 2011 season, and being split into two divisions in 2013. The first division's name was the K League Classic, and the second division's name was the K League Challenge at the time. The fact that both the first and the second divisions had very similar names caused some degree of confusion and controversy. Beginning with the 2018 season, both divisions were renamed the K League 1 and the K League 2 respectively.

In February 2021, an OTT service for international markets called K League TV was officially launched.

== Structure ==
Below K League 1 is the second-tier K League 2, and both form the K League as professional championships. Under them, there are two semi-professional leagues (K3 League and K4 League) and three amateur leagues (K5, K6 and K7 Leagues). At present, promotion and relegation exists within each of the three levels (professional, semi-professional, and amateur) but clubs from K3 and below cannot be promoted to the K League. However, the KFA has announced plans to combine the three promotion-relegation systems into one from 2027.

Since 2021, K League 1 and K League 2 teams have been permitted to field their reserve teams in the K4 League.

== Clubs ==
=== Current clubs ===
==== K League 1 ====
Locations of the 2026 K League 1 teams in the Seoul metropolitan area
Location of the 2026 K League 1 teams

==== K League 2 ====
Locations of the 2026 K League 2 teams in the Seoul metropolitan area
Location of the 2026 K League 2 teams

=== All-time clubs ===
As of 2026, there have been a total of 40 member clubs in the history of the K League – those clubs are listed below with their current names (where applicable):

- K League's principle of official statistics is that final club succeeds to predecessor club's history and records.
- Clubs in italics no longer exist.

| No. | Club | Owner(s) |
|---|---|---|
| 1 | POSCO Dolphins (1983–1984); POSCO Atoms (1985–1994); Pohang Atoms (1995–1996); Pohang Steelers (1997–present) | POSCO |
| 2 | Hallelujah FC (1983–1985) | Shindongah Group |
| 3 | Yukong Elephants (1983–1995); Bucheon Yukong (1996–1997); Bucheon SK (1997–2005); Jeju United (2006–2024); Jeju SK (2025–present) | SK Energy |
| 4 | Daewoo Royals (1983–1995); Busan Daewoo Royals (1996–1999); Busan I'Cons (2000–2004); Busan IPark (2005–present) | Daewoo (1983–1999); HDC Group (2000–present) |
| 5 | Kookmin Bank (1983–1984) | Kookmin Bank |
| 6 | Hyundai Horang-i (1984–1995); Ulsan Hyundai Horang-i (1996–2007); Ulsan Hyundai (2008–2023); Ulsan HD (2024–present) | Hyundai Motor Company (1984–1997); Hyundai Heavy Industries (1998–present) |
| 7 | Lucky-Goldstar Hwangso (1984–1990); LG Cheetahs (1991–1995); Anyang LG Cheetahs (1996–2003); FC Seoul (2004–present) | LG Group (1984–2004); GS Group (2004–present) |
| 8 | Hanil Bank FC (1984–1986) | Hanil Bank |
| 9 (Note: Sangmu, Gwangju Sangmu, Sangju Sangmu and Gimcheon Sangmu are separate legal entities according to the K League Federation) | Sangmu FC (1985) | Korea Armed Forces Athletic Corps |
| 10 | Ilhwa Chunma (1989–1995); Cheonan Ilhwa Chunma (1996–1999); Seongnam Ilhwa Chunma (2000–2013); Seongnam FC (2014–present) | Ilwha Company (1989–2013); Government of Seongnam (2014–present) |
| 11 | Chonbuk Buffalo (1994) | Bobae Soju |
| 12 | Jeonbuk Dinos (1995–1996); Jeonbuk Hyundai Dinos (1997–1999); Jeonbuk Hyundai Motors (2000–present) | Hyundai Motor Company; Hyunyang Company (1995–1999) |
| 13 | Jeonnam Dragons (1995–present) | POSCO |
| 14 | Suwon Samsung Bluewings (1996–present) | Samsung Electronics (1996–2014); Cheil Worldwide (2014–present) |
| 15 | Daejeon Citizen (1997–2019); Daejeon Hana Citizen (2020–present) | Dong Ah Group (1997–1998); Chungchong Bank (1997–1998); Dongyang Department Store (1997–1999); Kyeryong Construction Company (1997–2002); Government of Daejeon (2003–2019); Hana Financial Group (2020–present) |
| 16 | Gwangju Sangmu (2003–2010) | Korea Armed Forces Athletic Corps; Government of Gwangju |
| 17 | Daegu FC (2003–present) | Government of Daegu |
| 18 | Incheon United (2004–present) | Government of Incheon |
| 19 | Gyeongnam FC (2006–present) | Government of Gyeongnam Province |
| 20 | Gangwon FC (2009–present) | Government of Gangwon Province |
| 21 | Sangju Sangmu (2011–2020) | Korea Armed Forces Athletic Corps; Government of Sangju |
| 22 | Gwangju FC (2011–present) | Government of Gwangju |
| 23 (Note: Ansan Mugunghwa and Asan Mugunghwa are separate legal entities according to the K League Federation) | Police FC (2013); Ansan Police (2014–2015); Ansan Mugunghwa (2016) | KNP Sports Club; Government of Ansan (2014–2016) |
| 24 | Goyang Hi FC (2013–2015); Goyang Zaicro (2016) | |
| 25 | Chungju Hummel (2013–2016) | Hummel Korea |
| 26 | Suwon FC (2013–present) | Government of Suwon |
| 27 | Bucheon FC 1995 (2013–present) | Government of Bucheon |
| 28 | FC Anyang (2013–present) | Government of Anyang |
| 29 | Seoul E-Land (2015–present) | E-Land Group |
| 30 | Asan Mugunghwa (2017–2019) | KNP Sports Club; Government of Asan |
| 31 | Ansan Greeners (2017–present) | Government of Ansan |
| 32 | Chungnam Asan (2020–present) | Government of Asan; Government of Chungnam Province |
| 33 | Gimcheon Sangmu (2021–present) | Korea Armed Forces Athletic Corps; Government of Gimcheon |
| 34 | Gimpo FC (2022–present) | Government of Gimpo |
| 35 | Cheonan City (2023–present) | Government of Cheonan |
| 36 | Chungbuk Cheongju (2023–present) | Government of Cheongju |
| 37 | Hwaseong FC (2025–present) | Government of Hwaseong |
| 38 | Gimhae FC 2008 (2026–present) | Government of Gimhae |
| 39 | Paju Frontier (2026–present) | Government of Paju |
| 40 | Yongin FC (2026–present) | Government of Yongin |

== Champions ==
| Year | K League 1 | K League 2 |
|---|---|---|
| 1983 | Hallelujah FC | No second-tier professional league |
| 1984 | Daewoo Royals | No second-tier professional league |
| 1985 | Lucky-Goldstar Hwangso | No second-tier professional league |
| 1986 | POSCO Atoms | No second-tier professional league |
| 1987 | Daewoo Royals | No second-tier professional league |
| 1988 | POSCO Atoms | No second-tier professional league |
| 1989 | Yukong Elephants | No second-tier professional league |
| 1990 | Lucky-Goldstar Hwangso | No second-tier professional league |
| 1991 | Daewoo Royals | No second-tier professional league |
| 1992 | POSCO Atoms | No second-tier professional league |
| 1993 | Ilhwa Chunma | No second-tier professional league |
| 1994 | Ilhwa Chunma | No second-tier professional league |
| 1995 | Ilhwa Chunma | No second-tier professional league |
| 1996 | Ulsan Hyundai Horang-i | No second-tier professional league |
| 1997 | Busan Daewoo Royals | No second-tier professional league |
| 1998 | Suwon Samsung Bluewings | No second-tier professional league |
| 1999 | Suwon Samsung Bluewings | No second-tier professional league |
| 2000 | Anyang LG Cheetahs | No second-tier professional league |
| 2001 | Seongnam Ilhwa Chunma | No second-tier professional league |
| 2002 | Seongnam Ilhwa Chunma | No second-tier professional league |
| 2003 | Seongnam Ilhwa Chunma | No second-tier professional league |
| 2004 | Suwon Samsung Bluewings | No second-tier professional league |
| 2005 | Ulsan Hyundai Horang-i | No second-tier professional league |
| 2006 | Seongnam Ilhwa Chunma | No second-tier professional league |
| 2007 | Pohang Steelers | No second-tier professional league |
| 2008 | Suwon Samsung Bluewings | No second-tier professional league |
| 2009 | Jeonbuk Hyundai Motors | No second-tier professional league |
| 2010 | FC Seoul | No second-tier professional league |
| 2011 | Jeonbuk Hyundai Motors | No second-tier professional league |
| 2012 | FC Seoul | No second-tier professional league |
| 2013 | Pohang Steelers | Sangju Sangmu |
| 2014 | Jeonbuk Hyundai Motors | Daejeon Citizen |
| 2015 | Jeonbuk Hyundai Motors | Sangju Sangmu |
| 2016 | FC Seoul | Ansan Mugunghwa |
| 2017 | Jeonbuk Hyundai Motors | Gyeongnam FC |
| 2018 | Jeonbuk Hyundai Motors | Asan Mugunghwa |
| 2019 | Jeonbuk Hyundai Motors | Gwangju FC |
| 2020 | Jeonbuk Hyundai Motors | Jeju United |
| 2021 | Jeonbuk Hyundai Motors | Gimcheon Sangmu |
| 2022 | Ulsan Hyundai | Gwangju FC |
| 2023 | Ulsan Hyundai | Gimcheon Sangmu |
| 2024 | Ulsan HD | FC Anyang |
| 2025 | Jeonbuk Hyundai Motors | Incheon United |
| 2026 | FC Seoul | Suwon Samsung Bluewings |

== Promotion-relegation play-offs ==
The K League promotion-relegation play-offs were introduced in 2013 and are contested between the eleventh-placed team of K League 1 and the runners-up of K League 2. The first leg is always played at the second division team's home ground, while the second leg is played at the first division team's home ground. Starting in 2022, another series was added between the tenth-placed team of K League 1 and the third-placed team of K League 2.

| Season | K League 1 | Aggregate | K League 2 | 1st leg | 2nd leg |
|---|---|---|---|---|---|
| 2013 | Gangwon FC | 2–4 | Sangju Sangmu | 1–4 | 1–0 |
| 2014 | Gyeongnam FC | 2–4 | Gwangju FC | 1–3 | 1–1 |
| 2015 | Busan IPark | 0–3 | Suwon FC | 0–1 | 0–2 |
| 2016 | Seongnam FC | 1–1 (a) | Gangwon FC | 0–0 | 1–1 |
| 2017 | Sangju Sangmu | 1–1 (5–4 p) | Busan IPark | 1–0 | 0–1 (a.e.t.) |
| 2018 | FC Seoul | 4–2 | Busan IPark | 3–1 | 1–1 |
| 2019 | Gyeongnam FC | 0–2 | Busan IPark | 0–0 | 0–2 |
| 2020 | Not held (Note: Two K League 1 teams were relegated, so the runners-up of K League 2 were directly promoted.) | | | | |
| 2021 | Gangwon FC | 4–2 | Daejeon Hana Citizen | 0–1 | 4–1 |
| 2022 | Suwon Samsung Bluewings | 2–1 | FC Anyang | 0–0 | 2–1 (a.e.t.) |
| 2022 | Gimcheon Sangmu | 1–6 | Daejeon Hana Citizen | 1–2 | 0–4 |
| 2023 | Gangwon FC | 2–1 | Gimpo FC | 0–0 | 2–1 |
| 2023 | Suwon FC | 6–4 | Busan IPark | 1–2 | 5–2 (a.e.t.) |
| 2024 | Daegu FC | 6–5 | Chungnam Asan | 3–4 | 3–1 (a.e.t.) |
| 2024 | Jeonbuk Hyundai Motors | 4–2 | Seoul E-Land | 2–1 | 2–1 |
| 2025 | Jeju SK | 3–0 | Suwon Samsung Bluewings | 1–0 | 2–0 |
| 2025 | Suwon FC | 2–4 | Bucheon FC 1995 | 0–1 | 2–3 |

== Records and statistics ==
K League officially includes records of K League 1, K League 2, K League Championship, and Korean League Cup in its statistics.

As of 4 December 2025

| Category | Record holder | Record |
|---|---|---|
| Appearances | (South Korea) Kim Byung-ji | 708 |
| Goals | (South Korea) Lee Dong-gook | 228 |
| Assists | (South Korea) Yeom Ki-hun | 110 |
| Clean sheets | (South Korea) Kim Byung-ji | 229 |
| Longest goal | (South Korea) Kwon Jung-hyuk | 85 m |
| Fastest goal | (South Korea) Bang Seung-hwan | 00:11 |
| Fastest assist | (South Korea) Lee Jae-sung | 00:18 |

== Restriction of foreign players ==
At the inception of the K League in 1983, only two Brazilian players made rosters. At the time, rules allowed each club to have three foreign players and that the three could also play simultaneously in a game. From the 1996 season, each team had five foreign players among whom three could play in a game at the same time. In 1999, foreign goalkeepers were banned from the league because South Korean clubs excessively employed foreign goalkeepers after watching Valeri Sarychev's performances at that time. In 2001 and 2002, the limit on foreign players was expanded to seven but only three could play in a game at the same time. The limit was lowered to five in 2003, four in 2005, and three in 2007. Since 2009, the number of foreign players went back up to four per team, including a slot for a player from AFC countries. Between 2020 and 2024, Southeast Asian players could be registered under the ASEAN Quota. The prohibition of foreign goalkeepers was abolished in 2025, and they will be able to play in the league since 2026.

| Season | Lineup | Squad | Note |
|---|---|---|---|
| 1983–1993 | 2 | 2 | |
| 1994 | 2 | 3 | |
| 1995 | 3 | 3 | |
| 1996–2000 | 3 | 5 | The number of foreign goalkeepers' appearances was limited in 1997 and 1998, and their employment was banned in 1999.: 1997: Two-thirds of all matches; 1998: One-third of all matches; 1999–2025: Banned in the league |
| 2001–2002 | 3 | 7 | Temporary operation due to frequent call-ups of the World Cup team. |
| 2003–2004 | 3 | 5 | |
| 2005 | 3 | 4 | |
| 2006–2008 | 3 | 3 | |
| 2009–2019 | 3+1 | 3+1 | +1 AFC player |
| 2020–2024 | 3+1+1 | 3+1+1 | +1 AFC player +1 ASEAN player; only used by K League 2 since 2023. |
| 2023–2024 | 3+1 | 5+1 | +1 AFC player; only used by K League 1. |
| 2025–present | 4 | 5 or 6 | K League 1 teams can register six foreign players each in their squads, while K League 2 teams can register five. The foreign goalkeepers' employment is being allowed since 2026. |

== Relocation of clubs ==
In early years, the hometowns of K League clubs were determined, but they were pointless in substance because the clubs played all K League matches by going around all stadiums together. The current home and away system is being operated since 1987. The clubs were relocated from provinces to cities in 1990, but clubs are currently based in their area regardless of province and city since 1994. In 1996, the decentralization policy was operated. In result 3 clubs based in Seoul were relocated. Since 1996, it is obligatory for all clubs to include hometown name in their club name.

| Club | National tour system (1983–1986) | Home and away system (1987–present) |
|---|---|---|
| Pohang Steelers | Daegu–Gyeongbuk (1983) | Daegu–Gyeongbuk → Pohang (1988 (Note: K League officially introduced the relocation policy to cities in 1990, but POSCO Atoms already followed it in 1988.)) |
| Jeju SK | Seoul–Incheon–Gyeonggi (1983) → Seoul (1984) | Seoul → Incheon–Gyeonggi (1987) → Seoul (1991) → Bucheon (2001 (Note: Bucheon Yukong decided Bucheon as its new city in 1996, but played its home matches at Mokdong Stadium located in Mok-dong, Seoul until 2000, because Bucheon Stadium was under construction during that time.)) → Jeju (2006) |
| Busan IPark | Busan–Gyeongnam (1983) | Busan–Gyeongnam → Busan (1989 (Note: K League officially introduced the relocation policy to cities in 1990, but Daewoo Royals already followed it in 1989.)) |
| Ulsan HD | Incheon–Gyeonggi (1984) → Incheon–Gyeonggi–Gangwon (1986) | Gangwon (1987) → Ulsan (1990) |
| FC Seoul | Chungnam–Chungbuk (1984) | Chungnam–Chungbuk → Seoul (1990) → Anyang (1996) → Seoul (2004) |
| Seongnam FC | — | Seoul (1989) → Cheonan (1996) → Seongnam (2000) |
| Gimcheon Sangmu (Note: Gwangju Sangmu, Sangju Sangmu, and Gimcheon Sangmu are separate legal entities according to K League. Officially not relocated and founded as a new club.) | — | Gwangju (2003) → Sangju (2011) → Gimcheon (2021) |
| Asan Mugunghwa (Note: Police FC, Ansan Police, and Asan Mugunghwa are separate legal entities according to K League. Officially not relocated and re-founded as a new civil club named Chungnam Asan, in 2019.) | — | Unlocated (Note: Played all matches at away stadiums.) (2013) → Ansan (2014) → Asan (2017) |

== Awards ==
=== Annual awards ===
- K League Most Valuable Player Award
- K League Top Scorer Award
- K League Top Assist Provider Award
- K League Young Player of the Year Award
- K League Manager of the Year Award
- K League Best XI
- K League FANtastic Player

=== Hall of Fame ===
==== Stars ====
| Year | Inductee | Clubs | Ref. |
|---|---|---|---|
| 2023 | Choi Soon-ho | POSCO Atoms (1983–1987, 1991); Lucky-Goldstar Hwangso (1988–1990) | |
| 2023 | Hong Myung-bo | Pohang Steelers (1992–1997, 2002) | |
| 2023 | Shin Tae-yong | Seongnam Ilhwa Chunma (1992–2004) | |
| 2023 | Lee Dong-gook | Pohang Steelers (1998–2002, 2005–2006); Gwangju Sangmu (2003–2005); Seongnam Ilhwa Chunma (2008); Jeonbuk Hyundai Motors (2009–2020) | |
| 2025 | Kim Joo-sung | Busan Daewoo Royals (1987–1999) | |
| 2025 | Kim Byung-ji | Ulsan Hyundai Horang-i (1992–2000); Pohang Steelers (2001–2005); FC Seoul (2006–2008); Gyeongnam FC (2009–2012); Jeonnam Dragons (2013–2015) | |
| 2025 | Yoo Sang-chul | Ulsan Hyundai Horang-i (1994–1998, 2002–2003, 2005–2006) | |
| 2025 | Dejan Damjanović | Incheon United (2007); FC Seoul (2008–2013, 2016–2017); Suwon Samsung Bluewings (2018–2019); Daegu FC (2020) | |

==== Leaders ====
| Year | Inductee | Clubs | Ref. |
|---|---|---|---|
| 2023 | Kim Jung-nam | Yukong Elephants (1985–1992); Ulsan Hyundai (2000–2008) | |
| 2025 | Kim Ho | Hyundai Horang-i (1988–1990); Suwon Samsung Bluewings (1995–2003); Daejeon Citizen (2007–2009) | |

==== Honors ====
| Year | Inductee | Notes | Ref. |
|---|---|---|---|
| 2023 | Park Tae-joon | Founder of Pohang Steelers and Jeonnam Dragons | |
| 2025 | Chung Mong-joon | President of Korea Football Association (1993–2009); President of K League Federation (1994–1998); Vice-president of FIFA (1994–2011); President of East Asian Football Federation (2004) | |

== Sponsorship ==
| Sponsor | Season | Competition |
|---|---|---|
| None | 1983–1985 | Super League |
| None | 1986 | Football Festival |
| None | 1987–1993 | Korean Professional Football League |
| Hite | 1994–1995 | Hite Cup Korean League |
| Rapido | 1996–1997 | Rapido Cup Professional Football League |
| Hyundai Group | 1998 | Hyundai Cup K-League |
| Hyundai Securities | 1999 | Buy Korea Cup K-League |
| Samsung Electronics | 2000 | Samsung DigiTall K-League |
| POSCO | 2001 | POSCO K-League |
| Samsung Electronics | 2002 | Samsung PAVV K-League |
| Samsung Electronics | 2003–2008 | Samsung Hauzen K-League |
| None | 2009 | K-League |
| Hyundai Motor Company | 2010 | Sonata K-League |
| Hyundai Oilbank | 2011–2016 | Hyundai Oilbank K League |
| Hana Bank | 2017–2018 | KEB Hana Bank K League |
| Hana Bank | 2019–2023 | Hana 1Q K League |
| Hana Bank | 2024–present | Hana Bank K League |

== Controversies ==
=== Dependence on tax ===
After the 2002 FIFA World Cup, city-owned clubs operated by tax money have increased at the K League. The city-owned clubs currently outnumber companies' clubs, and most of them are heavily dependent on citizens' tax. In 2026, the prize money of the K League was ₩0.5 billion, whereas the sum of taxes used by city-owned clubs for a year amounted to ₩150 billion, and Cesinha, a foreign player of city-owned club Daegu FC, was receiving ₩2.1 billion per year. The citizens criticised these clubs for using their tax for about 10,000 fans of each club, and demanded the clubs create fair profits through sponsors and fans. However, football-related figures have participated in the election campaign to increase city-owned clubs and their jobs by getting cooperation with politicians. In 2024, Shin Moon-sun, a candidate for KFA president, also promised the increase of K League clubs to collect votes from football-related figures.

=== Origin of the name ===
The K League was founded in 1983, but the current name has been used since 1998. The name of "K League" was inspired by Japan's J.League, and started to be used by South Korean journalists in 1996. The league's federation officially adopted this name two years later, and was criticised for losing the league's characteristic. In 2005, the federation discussed whether the name should be change, but decided to maintain it.

=== Match-fixing scandal (2011) ===
A match-fixing scandal occurred at the K League in 2010 and was revealed in 2011. A total of 57 players were charged with the scandal and 55 players among them were punished.

== See also ==
- Football in South Korea
- Korean League Cup
- K League All-Star Game
- Korean Super Cup
- R League
