= 2024 in South Korean football =

Football in South Korea
- Season: 2024

Men's football
- K League 1: Ulsan HD
- K League 2: FC Anyang
- K3 League: Siheung Citizen
- K4 League: Jeonbuk Hyundai Motors B
- Korea Cup: Pohang Steelers

Women's football
- WK League: Suwon FC

This article shows a summary of the 2024 football season in South Korea.

== National teams ==
=== AFC Asian Cup ===
Under manager Jürgen Klinsmann, South Korea were considered among the pre-tournament favourites. After winning their opening match against Bahrain, the team failed to win their remaining two group stage matches after drawing with Jordan and Malaysia, respectively, finishing second in their group and conceding goals in all matches. South Korea narrowly advanced to the semi-finals after knocking out Saudi Arabia on penalties and Australia in extra time, but Klinsmann was heavily criticised for his lack of tactical ability. Korean FA president Chung Mong-gyu, who directly appointed Klinsmann as national team manager without a general process, was called to be held responsible for his decision after South Korea's semi-final loss to Jordan without a shot on target.

| 15 January Group E | South Korea | 3–1 | Bahrain | Al Rayyan, Qatar |
| 14:30 UTC+3 | Hwang In-beom 38'; Lee Kang-in 56', 68' | Report | Al-Hashsash 51' | Stadium: Jassim bin Hamad Stadium; Attendance: 8,388; Referee: Ma Ning (China) |

| 20 January Group E | Jordan | 2–2 | South Korea | Doha, Qatar |
| 14:30 UTC+3 | Park Yong-woo 37' (o.g.); Al-Naimat 45+6' | Report | Son Heung-min 9' (pen.); Al-Arab 90+1' (o.g.) | Stadium: Al Thumama Stadium; Attendance: 36,627; Referee: Salman Falahi (Qatar) |

| 25 January Group E | South Korea | 3–3 | Malaysia | Al Wakrah, Qatar |
| 14:30 UTC+3 | Jeong Woo-yeong 21'; Lee Kang-in 83'; Son Heung-min 90+4' (pen.) | Report | Faisal 51'; Arif 62' (pen.); Morales 90+15' | Stadium: Al Janoub Stadium; Attendance: 30,117; Referee: Khalid Al-Turais (Saudi Arabia) |

Group E table
| Pos | Team | Pld | W | D | L | GF | GA | GD | Pts | Qualification |
|---|---|---|---|---|---|---|---|---|---|---|
| 1 | Bahrain | 3 | 2 | 0 | 1 | 3 | 3 | 0 | 6 | Advance to knockout stage |
| 2 | South Korea | 3 | 1 | 2 | 0 | 8 | 6 | +2 | 5 | Advance to knockout stage |
| 3 | Jordan | 3 | 1 | 1 | 1 | 6 | 3 | +3 | 4 | Advance to knockout stage |
| 4 | Malaysia | 3 | 0 | 1 | 2 | 3 | 8 | –5 | 1 | |

| 30 January Round of 16 | Saudi Arabia | 1–1 (a.e.t.) (2–4 p) | South Korea | Al Rayyan, Qatar |
| 19:00 UTC+3 | Radif 46' | Report | Cho Gue-sung 90+9' | Stadium: Education City Stadium; Attendance: 42,389; Referee: Ilgiz Tantashev (Uzbekistan) |
| | Penalties |
| | Kanno (penalty scored); Abdulhamid (penalty scored); Al-Najei (penalty missed); Ghareeb (penalty missed) | | (penalty scored) Son Heung-min; (penalty scored) Kim Young-gwon; (penalty scored) Cho Gue-sung; (penalty scored) Hwang Hee-chan |

| 2 February Quarter-finals | Australia | 1–2 (a.e.t.) | South Korea | Al Wakrah, Qatar |
| 18:30 UTC+3 | Goodwin 42' | Report | Hwang Hee-chan 90+6' (pen.); Son Heung-min 104' | Stadium: Al Janoub Stadium; Attendance: 39,632; Referee: Ahmed Al-Kaf (Oman) |

| 6 February Semi-finals | Jordan | 2–0 | South Korea | Al Rayyan, Qatar |
| 18:00 UTC+3 | Al-Naimat 53'; Al-Taamari 66' | Report | | Stadium: Ahmad bin Ali Stadium; Attendance: 42,850; Referee: Mohammed Abdulla Hassan Mohamed (United Arab Emirates) |

=== FIFA World Cup qualification ===
| 21 March AFC second round, Group C | South Korea | 1–1 | Thailand | Seoul, South Korea |
| 20:00 UTC+9 | Son Heung-min 42' | Report | Mueanta 61' | Stadium: Seoul World Cup Stadium; Attendance: 64,912; Referee: Khalid Al-Turais (Saudi Arabia) |

| 26 March AFC second round, Group C | Thailand | 0–3 | South Korea | Bangkok, Thailand |
| 19:30 UTC+7 | | Report | Lee Jae-sung 19'; Son Heung-min 54'; Park Jin-seop 82' | Stadium: Rajamangala Stadium; Attendance: 45,458; Referee: Adham Makhadmeh (Jordan) |

| 6 June AFC second round, Group C | Singapore | 0–7 | South Korea | Kallang, Singapore |
| 20:00 UTC+8 | | Report | Lee Kang-in 9', 54'; Joo Min-kyu 20'; Son Heung-min 53', 56'; Bae Jun-ho 79'; Hwang Hee-chan 82' | Stadium: National Stadium; Attendance: 49,097; Referee: Sadullo Gulmurodi (Tajikistan) |

| 11 June AFC second round, Group C | South Korea | 1–0 | China | Seoul, South Korea |
| 20:00 UTC+9 | Lee Kang-in 61' | Report | | Stadium: Seoul World Cup Stadium; Attendance: 64,935; Referee: Mohammed Al Hoish (Saudi Arabia) |

AFC second round, Group C table
| Pos | Team | Pld | W | D | L | GF | GA | GD | Pts | Qualification |
|---|---|---|---|---|---|---|---|---|---|---|
| 1 | South Korea | 6 | 5 | 1 | 0 | 20 | 1 | +19 | 16 | Advance to AFC third round |
| 2 | China (Note: Head-to-head points: China 4, Thailand 1.) | 6 | 2 | 2 | 2 | 9 | 9 | 0 | 8 | Advance to AFC third round |
| 3 | Thailand | 6 | 2 | 2 | 2 | 9 | 9 | 0 | 8 | |
| 4 | Singapore | 6 | 0 | 1 | 5 | 5 | 24 | −19 | 1 | |

Source: FIFA AFC
Rules for classification: Tiebreakers

| 5 September AFC third round, Group B | South Korea | 0–0 | Palestine | Seoul, South Korea |
| 20:00 UTC+9 | | Report | | Stadium: Seoul World Cup Stadium; Attendance: 59,579; Referee: Alireza Faghani (Australia) |

| 10 September AFC third round, Group B | Oman | 1–3 | South Korea | Muscat, Oman |
| 18:00 UTC+4 | Jung Seung-hyun 45+2' (o.g.) | Report | Hwang Hee-chan 10'; Son Heung-min 82'; Joo Min-kyu 90+11' | Stadium: Sultan Qaboos Sports Complex; Referee: Ma Ning (China) |

| 10 October AFC third round, Group B | Jordan | 0–2 | South Korea | Amman, Jordan |
| 17:00 UTC+3 | | Report | Lee Jae-sung 38'; Oh Hyeon-gyu 68' | Stadium: Amman International Stadium; Referee: Hiroyuki Kimura (Japan) |

| 15 October AFC third round, Group B | South Korea | 3–2 | Iraq | Yongin, South Korea |
| 20:00 UTC+9 | Oh Se-hun 41'; Oh Hyeon-gyu 74'; Lee Jae-sung 83' | Report | Hussein 50'; Bayesh 90+5' | Stadium: Yongin Mireu Stadium; Attendance: 35,198; Referee: Rustam Lutfullin (Uzbekistan) |

| 14 November AFC third round, Group B | Kuwait | 1–3 | South Korea | Kuwait City, Kuwait |
| 17:00 UTC+3 | Daham 60' | | Oh Se-hun 10'; Son Heung-min 19' (pen.); Bae Jun-ho 74' | Stadium: Jaber Al-Ahmad International Stadium, Kuwait City; Attendance: 22,791; Referee: Shaun Evans (Australia) |

| 19 November AFC third round, Group B | Palestine | 1–1 | South Korea | Amman, Jordan |
| 17:00 UTC+3 | Qunbar 12' | Report | Son Heung-min 16' | Stadium: Amman International Stadium; Attendance: 2,405; Referee: Yusuke Araki (Japan) |

=== AFC U-23 Asian Cup ===
| 16 April Group B | South Korea | 1–0 | United Arab Emirates | Qatar |
| | Lee Young-jun 90+4' | Report | | Attendance: Abdullah bin Khalifa Stadium, Doha; Referee: Rustam Lutfullin (Uzbekistan) |

| 19 April Group B | China | 0–2 | South Korea | Qatar |
| | | Report | Lee Young-jun 34', 69' | Stadium: Abdullah bin Khalifa Stadium, Doha; Referee: Mohammed Al-Shammari (Qatar) |

| 22 April Group B | Japan | 0–1 | South Korea | Al Rayyan, Qatar |
| 16:00 UTC+3 | | Report | Kim Min-woo 75' | Stadium: Jassim Bin Hamad Stadium; Referee: Majed Al-Shamrani (Saudi Arabia) |

Group B table
| Pos | Team | Pld | W | D | L | GF | GA | GD | Pts | Qualification |
|---|---|---|---|---|---|---|---|---|---|---|
| 1 | South Korea | 3 | 3 | 0 | 0 | 4 | 0 | +4 | 9 | Advance to knockout stage |
| 2 | Japan | 3 | 2 | 0 | 1 | 3 | 1 | +2 | 6 | Advance to knockout stage |
| 3 | China | 3 | 1 | 0 | 2 | 2 | 4 | −2 | 3 | |
| 4 | United Arab Emirates | 3 | 0 | 0 | 3 | 1 | 5 | −4 | 0 | |

Source: AFC

| 25 April Quarter-finals | South Korea | 2–2 (a.e.t.) (10–11 p) | Indonesia | Doha, Qatar |
| 20:30 UTC+3 | Komang 45' (o.g.); Jeong Sang-bin 84' | Report | Struick 15', 45+3' | Stadium: Abdullah bin Khalifa Stadium; Referee: Shaun Evans (Australia) |
| | Penalties |
| | Kim Min-woo (penalty scored); Lee Kang-hee (penalty scored); Hwang Jae-won (penalty scored); Paik Sang-hoon (penalty scored); Byun Joon-soo (penalty scored); Kang Sang-yoon (penalty missed); Jeong Sang-bin (penalty scored); Hong Yun-sang (penalty scored); Cho Hyun-taek (penalty scored); Baek Jong-bum (penalty scored); Kim Min-woo (penalty scored); Lee Kang-hee (penalty missed) | | (penalty scored) Sananta; (penalty scored) Arhan; (penalty scored) Struick; (penalty scored) Marselino; (penalty scored) Hubner; (penalty missed) Arkhan; (penalty scored) Sroyer; (penalty scored) Ridho; (penalty scored) Ferarri; (penalty scored) Ernando; (penalty scored) Sananta; (penalty scored) Arhan |

=== WAFF U-23 Championship ===
| 20 March Quarter-finals | South Korea | 1–0 | Thailand | Hofuf, Saudi Arabia |
| 20:00 UTC+3 | Cho Hyun-taek 45+1' | Report | | Stadium: Prince Abdullah bin Jalawi Stadium; Attendance: 100; Referee: Alaeddin Sheikh Ahmad (Lebanon) |

| 23 March Semi-finals | Saudi Arabia | 0–1 | South Korea | Al Mubarraz, Saudi Arabia |
| 23:00 UTC+3 | | Report | Eom Ji-sung 41' | Stadium: Al Fateh Stadium; Attendance: 1,500; Referee: Saad Ahmed (Egypt) |

| 26 March Final | Australia | 2–2 (3–4 p) | South Korea | Al Mubarraz, Saudi Arabia |
| 23:00 UTC+3 | A. Kuol 11', 72' | Report | Lee Young-jun 26'; Kang Seong-jin 62' | Stadium: Al Fateh Stadium |
| | Penalties |
| | A. Kuol (penalty scored); Italiano (penalty scored); D'Arrigo (penalty scored); J. Hollman (penalty missed); G. Kuol (penalty missed) | | (penalty scored) Lee Tae-seok; (penalty scored) Lee Kang-hee; (penalty scored) An Jae-jun; (penalty scored) Seo Myung-guan |

=== Friendlies ===
==== Senior team ====
| 6 January | South Korea | 1–0 | Iraq | Abu Dhabi, United Arab Emirates |
| 17:00 UTC+4 | Lee Jae-sung 40' | Report | | Stadium: New York University Stadium; Attendance: 100; Referee: Yahya Al-Mulla (United Arab Emirates) |

==== Under-23 team ====
| 9 April | Saudi Arabia | 1–0 | South Korea | Abu Dhabi, United Arab Emirates |
| | Thakri 72' | Report | | Stadium: Al Nahyan Stadium |

| 3 June Maurice Revello Tournament | South Korea | 0–2 | Saudi Arabia | Vitrolles, France |
| 14:00 UTC+2 | | Report | Al-Zaid 80'; Al-Asmari 90+3' | Stadium: Stade Jules-Ladoumègue; Referee: Veronika Bernatskaia (Kyrgyzstan) |

| 5 June Maurice Revello Tournament | Ivory Coast U20 | 2–1 | South Korea | Fos-sur-Mer, France |
| 14:00 UTC+2 | Wawa 12'; Ouotro 72' | Report | Hong Yong-jun 90' | Stadium: Stade Parsemain; Referee: Odette Hamilton (Jamaica) |

| 7 June Maurice Revello Tournament | France | 1–0 | South Korea | Aubagne, France |
| 17:30 UTC+2 | Virginius 40' | Report | | Stadium: Stade de Lattre-de-Tassigny; Referee: Susana Corella (Ecuador) |

| 11 June Maurice Revello Tournament | South Korea | 0–0 (3–5 p) | Mexico | Fos-sur-Mer, France |
| 14:00 UTC+2 | | Report | | Stadium: Stade Parsemain; Referee: Antsino Twanyanyukwa (Namibia) |
| | Penalties |
| | Jung Sung-woo (penalty scored); Jo Jin-ho (penalty missed); Moon Seong-woo (penalty scored); Ahn Jae-min (penalty scored) | | (penalty scored) Alcántar; (penalty scored) Ambríz; (penalty scored) Monroy; (penalty scored) J. Rodríguez; (penalty scored) Álvarez |

| 14 June Maurice Revello Tournament | South Korea | 2–1 | Indonesia U20 | Saint-Chamas, France |
| 14:00 UTC+2 | Jung Seung-bae 48', 59' | Report | Firmansyah 78' | Stadium: Stade René Gimet; Referee: Akhona Makalima (South Africa) |

==== Women's team ====
| 24 February | Czech Republic | 1–2 | South Korea | Lisbon, Portugal |
| 18:00 UTC+0 | Bartoňová 53' | Report | Ji So-yun 16'; Phair 46' | Referee: Sandra Braz Bastos (Portugal) |

| 27 February | Portugal | 5–1 | South Korea | Estoril, Portugal |
| --:-- UTC+0 | Joana Marchão 18'; Andreia 37'; Encarnação 45'; Jessica Silva 45+2', 52' | | Son Hwa-yeon 79' | Stadium: Estádio António Coimbra da Mota; Referee: Daniela Constantinescu (Romania) |

| 5 April | Philippines | 0–3 | South Korea | Icheon, South Korea |
| | | Report | Choe Yu-ri 73'; Ji So-yun 76'; Jang Sel-gi 88' | Stadium: Icheon Sports Complex |

| 8 April | Philippines | 1–2 | South Korea | Icheon, South Korea |
| 19:00 UTC+9 | Beard 74' | Report | Choo Hyo-joo 1'; Choe Yu-ri 33' | Stadium: Icheon Sports Complex |

| 1 June | United States | 4–0 | South Korea | Commerce City, United States |
| 15:00 UTC−6 | Swanson 34', 74'; Davidson 38', 48' | Report | | Stadium: Dick's Sporting Goods Park; Attendance: 19,010; Referee: Carly Shaw-MacLaren (Canada) |

| 4 June | United States | 3–0 | South Korea | St. Paul, United States |
| 19:00 UTC−5 | Dunn 13'; Smith 67'; Yohannes 82' | Report | | Stadium: Allianz Field; Attendance: 19,169; Referee: Astrid Azucena Gramajo (Guatemala) |

| 26 October | Japan | 4–0 | South Korea | Tokyo, Japan |
| 14:20 UTC+9 | Kitagawa 33'; Fujino 34'; Tanaka 37'; Tanikawa 56' | Report | | Stadium: Japan National Stadium; Attendance: 12,420; Referee: Shu Ting Yang (Chinese Taipei) |

| 29 November | Spain | 5–0 | South Korea | Cartagena, Spain |
| 19:00 UTC+1 | Pina 4'; Sarriegi 33'; Bonmatí 45+1'; López 63', 90+3' | Report | | Stadium: Estadio Cartagonova; Attendance: 8,660; Referee: Kirsty Dowle (England) |

| 3 December | Canada | 5–1 | South Korea | Murcia, Spain |
| 18:00 UTC+1 | Lim Seon-joo 22' (o.g.); Alidou 52'; Smith 58'; Gilles 78'; Leon 90+2' | Report | Lee Hyo-kyeong 76' | Stadium: Pinatar Arena |

== Leagues ==
=== K League 1 ===
| Pos | Team | Pld | W | D | L | GF | GA | GD | Pts | Qualification or relegation (Note: Teams played each other three times (33 matches), before the league was split into two groups, the top six and the bottom six.) |
|---|---|---|---|---|---|---|---|---|---|---|
| 1 | Ulsan HD (C) | 38 | 21 | 9 | 8 | 62 | 40 | +22 | 72 | Qualification for Champions League Elite league stage |
| 2 | Gangwon FC | 38 | 19 | 7 | 12 | 62 | 56 | +6 | 64 | Qualification for Champions League Elite league stage |
| 3 | Gimcheon Sangmu (Note: Military-owned team Gimcheon Sangmu cannot qualify for AFC competitions.) | 38 | 18 | 9 | 11 | 55 | 41 | +14 | 63 | |
| 4 | FC Seoul | 38 | 16 | 10 | 12 | 55 | 42 | +13 | 58 | Qualification for Champions League Elite league stage |
| 5 | Suwon FC | 38 | 15 | 8 | 15 | 54 | 57 | −3 | 53 | |
| 6 | Pohang Steelers | 38 | 14 | 11 | 13 | 53 | 50 | +3 | 53 | Qualification for Champions League Two group stage (Note: Qualified as Korea Cup champions.) |
| 7 | Jeju United | 38 | 15 | 4 | 19 | 38 | 54 | −16 | 49 | |
| 8 | Daejeon Hana Citizen | 38 | 12 | 12 | 14 | 43 | 47 | −4 | 48 | |
| 9 | Gwangju FC | 38 | 14 | 5 | 19 | 42 | 49 | −7 | 47 | |
| 10 | Jeonbuk Hyundai Motors (O) | 38 | 10 | 12 | 16 | 49 | 59 | −10 | 42 | Qualification for relegation play-offs |
| 11 | Daegu FC (O) | 38 | 9 | 13 | 16 | 45 | 52 | −7 | 40 | Qualification for relegation play-offs |
| 12 | Incheon United (R) | 38 | 9 | 12 | 17 | 38 | 49 | −11 | 39 | Relegation to K League 2 |

Source: Soccerway K League
Rules for classification: 1) Points; 2) Goals scored; 3) Goal difference; 4) Wins; 5) Head-to-head points
(C) Champions; (O) Play-off winners; (R) Relegated

=== K League 2 ===
==== Regular season ====
| Pos | Team | Pld | W | D | L | GF | GA | GD | Pts | Promotion or qualification |
|---|---|---|---|---|---|---|---|---|---|---|
| 1 | FC Anyang (C, P) | 36 | 18 | 9 | 9 | 51 | 36 | +15 | 63 | Promotion to K League 1 |
| 2 | Chungnam Asan | 36 | 17 | 9 | 10 | 60 | 44 | +16 | 60 | Qualification for promotion play-offs final round |
| 3 | Seoul E-Land | 36 | 17 | 7 | 12 | 62 | 45 | +17 | 58 | Qualification for promotion play-offs second round |
| 4 | Jeonnam Dragons | 36 | 16 | 9 | 11 | 61 | 50 | +11 | 57 | Qualification for promotion play-offs first round |
| 5 | Busan IPark | 36 | 16 | 8 | 12 | 55 | 45 | +10 | 56 | Qualification for promotion play-offs first round |
| 6 | Suwon Samsung Bluewings | 36 | 15 | 11 | 10 | 46 | 35 | +11 | 56 | |
| 7 | Gimpo FC | 36 | 14 | 12 | 10 | 43 | 41 | +2 | 54 | |
| 8 | Bucheon FC 1995 | 36 | 12 | 13 | 11 | 44 | 45 | −1 | 49 | |
| 9 | Cheonan City | 36 | 11 | 10 | 15 | 48 | 57 | −9 | 43 | |
| 10 | Chungbuk Cheongju | 36 | 8 | 16 | 12 | 32 | 42 | −10 | 40 | |
| 11 | Ansan Greeners | 36 | 9 | 10 | 17 | 35 | 48 | −13 | 37 | |
| 12 | Gyeongnam FC | 36 | 6 | 15 | 15 | 45 | 62 | −17 | 33 | |
| 13 | Seongnam FC | 36 | 5 | 11 | 20 | 34 | 66 | −32 | 26 | |

Source: K League Soccerway
Rules for classification: 1) Points; 2) Goals scored; 3) Goal difference; 4) Wins; 5) Head-to-head points
(C) Champions; (P) Promoted

==== Promotion play-offs ====
First round
4 | Jeonnam Dragons | 0
5 | Busan IPark | 0

Second round
3 | Seoul E-Land | 2
4 | Jeonnam Dragons | 2

Final 1
Seoul E-Land | 1 | 1 | 2
Jeonbuk Hyundai Motors | 2 | 2 | 4
Final 2
Chungnam Asan | 4 | 1 | 5
Daegu FC (a.e.t.) | 3 | 3 | 6

=== K3 League ===
| Pos | Team | Pld | W | D | L | GF | GA | GD | Pts | Promotion or relegation |
|---|---|---|---|---|---|---|---|---|---|---|
| 1 | Siheung Citizen (C) | 30 | 18 | 6 | 6 | 60 | 27 | +33 | 60 | |
| 2 | Hwaseong FC (P) | 30 | 16 | 8 | 6 | 56 | 32 | +24 | 56 | Promotion to K League 2 (Note: Promoted after getting a license for K League 2.) |
| 3 | Gyeongju KHNP | 30 | 17 | 5 | 8 | 44 | 28 | +16 | 56 | |
| 4 | Changwon FC | 30 | 14 | 8 | 8 | 48 | 31 | +17 | 50 | |
| 5 | Gimhae FC | 30 | 13 | 11 | 6 | 41 | 28 | +13 | 50 | |
| 6 | FC Mokpo | 30 | 15 | 4 | 11 | 49 | 45 | +4 | 49 | |
| 7 | Daejeon Korail | 30 | 11 | 13 | 6 | 42 | 28 | +14 | 46 | |
| 8 | Paju Citizen | 30 | 11 | 9 | 10 | 30 | 30 | 0 | 42 | |
| 9 | Gangneung Citizen | 30 | 10 | 9 | 11 | 34 | 41 | −7 | 39 | |
| 10 | Yangpyeong FC | 30 | 11 | 4 | 15 | 33 | 45 | −12 | 37 | |
| 11 | Yeoju FC | 30 | 9 | 8 | 13 | 26 | 42 | −16 | 35 | |
| 12 | Ulsan Citizen | 30 | 9 | 7 | 14 | 30 | 43 | −13 | 34 | |
| 13 | Busan Transportation Corporation | 30 | 9 | 3 | 18 | 38 | 60 | −22 | 30 | |
| 14 | Chuncheon Citizen | 30 | 4 | 14 | 12 | 27 | 38 | −11 | 26 | |
| 15 | Pocheon Citizen (O) | 30 | 5 | 11 | 14 | 34 | 49 | −15 | 26 | Qualification for relegation play-off |
| 16 | Daegu FC B (R) | 30 | 5 | 6 | 19 | 36 | 61 | −25 | 21 | Relegation to K4 League |

Source: Soccerway
Rules for classification: 1) Points; 2) Goal difference; 3) Goals scored; 4) Wins
(C) Champions; (O) Play-off winners; (P) Promoted; (R) Relegated

=== K4 League ===
==== Regular season ====
| Pos | Team | Pld | W | D | L | GF | GA | GD | Pts | Qualification |
|---|---|---|---|---|---|---|---|---|---|---|
| 1 | Jeonbuk Hyundai Motors B (C, P) | 24 | 17 | 3 | 4 | 57 | 27 | +30 | 54 | Promotion to K3 League |
| 2 | Daejeon Hana Citizen B (Note: Daejeon Hana Citizen B did not qualify for the promotion play-off due to its dissolution after the season.) | 24 | 11 | 4 | 9 | 41 | 32 | +9 | 37 | |
| 3 | Seoul Nowon United (Note: Seoul Nowon United received a 9-point deduction.) | 24 | 13 | 4 | 7 | 63 | 43 | +20 | 34 | Qualification for promotion play-off |
| 4 | Jeonju Citizen | 24 | 9 | 7 | 8 | 43 | 36 | +7 | 34 | |
| 5 | Jinju Citizen | 24 | 10 | 4 | 10 | 36 | 36 | 0 | 34 | |
| 6 | Namyangju FC | 24 | 9 | 7 | 8 | 36 | 36 | 0 | 34 | |
| 7 | Dangjin Citizen | 24 | 11 | 1 | 12 | 46 | 47 | −1 | 34 | |
| 8 | Geoje Citizen | 24 | 9 | 7 | 8 | 38 | 47 | −9 | 34 | |
| 9 | Pyeongchang United | 24 | 9 | 5 | 10 | 39 | 35 | +4 | 32 | |
| 10 | FC Chungju (Note: FC Chungju received a 2-point deduction.) | 24 | 10 | 4 | 10 | 43 | 43 | 0 | 32 | |
| 11 | Seoul Jungnang (Note: Seoul Jungnang received a 4-point deduction.) | 24 | 8 | 6 | 10 | 34 | 38 | −4 | 26 | |
| 12 | Pyeongtaek Citizen | 24 | 6 | 7 | 11 | 39 | 34 | +5 | 25 | |
| 13 | FC Sejong | 24 | 3 | 3 | 18 | 29 | 90 | −61 | 12 | |

Source: Soccerway
Rules for classification: 1) Points; 2) Goal difference; 3) Head-to-head points; 4) Goals scored; 5) Wins
(C) Champions; (P) Promoted

==== Promotion play-off ====
The promotion play-off was contested between the 15th-placed team of K3 League and the third-placed team of K4 League (instead of runners-up Daejeon Hana Citizen B).

9 November
14:00 (UTC+9)

| Pocheon Citizen | 3–1 | Seoul Nowon United |
|---|---|---|
| | Report |

Pocheon Stadium, Pocheon

=== WK League ===
==== Regular season ====
| Pos | Team | Pld | W | D | L | GF | GA | GD | Pts | Qualification |
|---|---|---|---|---|---|---|---|---|---|---|
| 1 | Hwacheon KSPO | 28 | 16 | 8 | 4 | 49 | 27 | +22 | 56 | Qualification for Championship |
| 2 | Suwon FC | 28 | 15 | 8 | 5 | 47 | 31 | +16 | 53 | Qualification for Play-off |
| 3 | Gyeongju KHNP | 28 | 14 | 9 | 5 | 54 | 36 | +18 | 51 | Qualification for Play-off |
| 4 | Incheon Hyundai Steel Red Angels | 28 | 12 | 11 | 5 | 36 | 25 | +11 | 47 | |
| 5 | Sejong Sportstoto | 28 | 9 | 11 | 8 | 31 | 30 | +1 | 38 | |
| 6 | Seoul City | 28 | 6 | 9 | 13 | 33 | 44 | −11 | 27 | |
| 7 | Mungyeong Sangmu | 28 | 4 | 7 | 17 | 24 | 45 | −21 | 19 | |
| 8 | Changnyeong WFC | 28 | 2 | 5 | 21 | 11 | 47 | −36 | 11 | |

Source: Soccerway

==== Championship play-offs ====
| Play-off (Semi-final) | | | Championship (Finals) |
| | | | 1 | Hwacheon KSPO | 0 | 2 | 2 |
| 2 | Suwon FC (p) | 1 (5) | | Suwon FC | 2 | 1 | 3 |
| 3 | Gyeongju KHNP | 1 (4) |

==== Final table ====
| Pos | Team | Qualification |
|---|---|---|
| 1 | Suwon FC (C) | Qualification for Champions League |
| 2 | Hwacheon KSPO | |
| 3 | Gyeongju KHNP | |

Source: Soccerway
(C) Champions

== Domestic cups ==
=== Korea Cup ===
Round of 16 (Fourth round)
Pohang Steelers (p) | 1 (5)
Suwon Samsung Bluewings | 1 (4)
FC Seoul (p) | 0 (5)
Gangwon FC | 0 (4)
Gimpo FC | 1
Jeonbuk Hyundai Motors | 0
Daejeon Hana Citizen | 0 (7)
Jeju United (p) | 0 (8)
Bucheon FC 1995 | 2
Gwangju FC | 3
Seongnam FC (p) | 1 (5)
Chungbuk Cheongju | 1 (4)
Ulsan HD (p) | 4 (3)
Gyeongnam FC | 4 (0)
Incheon United (p) | 0 (4)
Gimcheon Sangmu | 0 (3)

Quarter-finals (Fifth round)
Pohang Steelers | 5
FC Seoul | 1
Gimpo FC | 0
Jeju United | 1
Gwangju FC (a.e.t.) | 3
Seongnam FC | 2
Ulsan HD | 1
Incheon United | 0

Semi-finals (Sixth round)
Pohang Steelers | 2 | 2 | 4
Jeju United | 2 | 1 | 3
Gwangju FC | 0 | 2 | 2
Ulsan HD | 1 | 2 | 3

Final (Seventh round)
Pohang Steelers (a.e.t.) | 3
Ulsan HD | 1

== International cups ==
=== AFC Champions League Elite ===
==== 2023–24 season ====
The previous rounds before the knockout stage were held in 2023.

| Team | Result | Round | Aggregate | Score | Venue | Opponent |
|---|---|---|---|---|---|---|
| Jeonbuk Hyundai Motors | Quarter-finals | Round of 16 | 3–1 | 2–0 | Home | (South Korea) Pohang Steelers |
| Jeonbuk Hyundai Motors | Quarter-finals | Round of 16 | 3–1 | 1–1 | Away | (South Korea) Pohang Steelers |
| Jeonbuk Hyundai Motors | Quarter-finals | Quarter-finals | 1–2 | 1–1 | Home | (South Korea) Ulsan HD |
| Jeonbuk Hyundai Motors | Quarter-finals | Quarter-finals | 1–2 | 0–1 | Away | (South Korea) Ulsan HD |
| Pohang Steelers | Round of 16 | Round of 16 | 1–3 | 0–2 | Away | (South Korea) Jeonbuk Hyundai Motors |
| Pohang Steelers | Round of 16 | Round of 16 | 1–3 | 1–1 | Home | (South Korea) Jeonbuk Hyundai Motors |
| Ulsan HD | Semi-finals | Round of 16 | 5–1 | 3–0 | Home | (Japan) Ventforet Kofu |
| Ulsan HD | Semi-finals | Round of 16 | 5–1 | 2–1 | Away | (Japan) Ventforet Kofu |
| Ulsan HD | Semi-finals | Quarter-finals | 2–1 | 1–1 | Away | (South Korea) Jeonbuk Hyundai Motors |
| Ulsan HD | Semi-finals | Quarter-finals | 2–1 | 1–0 | Home | (South Korea) Jeonbuk Hyundai Motors |
| Ulsan HD | Semi-finals | Semi-finals | 3–3 (4–5 p) | 1–0 | Home | (Japan) Yokohama F. Marinos |
| Ulsan HD | Semi-finals | Semi-finals | 3–3 (4–5 p) | 2–3 (a.e.t.) | Away | (Japan) Yokohama F. Marinos |

==== 2024–25 season ====
The other two league stage matches and the next rounds were held in 2025.

| Team | Round | Score | Venue | Opponent |
|---|---|---|---|---|
| Gwangju FC | League East | 7–3 | Home | (Japan) Yokohama F. Marinos |
| Gwangju FC | League East | 1–0 | Away | (Japan) Kawasaki Frontale |
| Gwangju FC | League East | 3–1 | Home | (Malaysia) Johor Darul Ta'zim |
| Gwangju FC | League East | 0–2 | Away | (Japan) Vissel Kobe |
| Gwangju FC | League East | 1–0 | Home | (China) Shanghai Shenhua |
| Gwangju FC | League East | 1–1 | Away | (China) Shanghai Port |
| Pohang Steelers | League East | 1–4 | Away | (China) Shanghai Shenhua |
| Pohang Steelers | League East | 3–0 | Home | (China) Shanghai Port |
| Pohang Steelers | League East | 0–1 | Away | (Thailand) Buriram United |
| Pohang Steelers | League East | ~~4–2~~ Cancelled | Home | (China) Shandong Taishan |
| Pohang Steelers | League East | 0–2 | Away | (Japan) Yokohama F. Marinos |
| Pohang Steelers | League East | 3–1 | Home | (Japan) Vissel Kobe |
| Ulsan HD | League East | 0–1 | Home | (Japan) Kawasaki Frontale |
| Ulsan HD | League East | 0–4 | Away | (Japan) Yokohama F. Marinos |
| Ulsan HD | League East | 0–2 | Home | (Japan) Vissel Kobe |
| Ulsan HD | League East | 0–3 | Away | (Malaysia) Johor Darul Ta'zim |
| Ulsan HD | League East | 1–3 | Home | (China) Shanghai Port |
| Ulsan HD | League East | 2–1 | Away | (China) Shanghai Shenhua |

=== AFC Champions League Two ===
The next rounds after the group stage were held in 2025.

| Team | Result | Round | Aggregate | Score | Venue | Opponent |
|---|---|---|---|---|---|---|
| Jeonbuk Hyundai Motors | Knockout stage | Group H | Winners | 6–0 | Away | (Philippines) Dynamic Herb Cebu |
| Jeonbuk Hyundai Motors | Knockout stage | Group H | Winners | 4–0 | Home | (Philippines) Dynamic Herb Cebu |
| Jeonbuk Hyundai Motors | Knockout stage | Group H | Winners | 4–1 | Home | (Thailand) Muangthong United |
| Jeonbuk Hyundai Motors | Knockout stage | Group H | Winners | 0–1 | Away | (Thailand) Muangthong United |
| Jeonbuk Hyundai Motors | Knockout stage | Group H | Winners | 1–2 | Away | (Malaysia) Selangor |
| Jeonbuk Hyundai Motors | Knockout stage | Group H | Winners | 1–0 | Home | (Malaysia) Selangor |

=== AFC Women's Champions League ===
The next rounds after the group stage were held in 2025.

| Team | Result | Round | Aggregate | Score | Venue | Opponent |
|---|---|---|---|---|---|---|
| Incheon Hyundai Steel Red Angels | Knockout stage | Group A | Winners | 3–0 | — | (Malaysia) Sabah |
| Incheon Hyundai Steel Red Angels | Knockout stage | Group A | Winners | 2–2 | — | (United Arab Emirates) Abu Dhabi Country Club |
| Incheon Hyundai Steel Red Angels | Knockout stage | Group A | Winners | 2–0 | — | (China) Wuhan Jianghan University |

== See also ==
- Football in South Korea
