= 2025 in South Korean football =

Football in South Korea
- Season: 2025

Men's football
- K League 1: Jeonbuk Hyundai Motors
- K League 2: Incheon United
- K3 League: Gimhae FC 2008
- K4 League: Dangjin Citizen
- Korea Cup: Jeonbuk Hyundai Motors

Women's football
- WK League: Hwacheon KSPO

This article shows a summary of the 2025 football season in South Korea.

== National teams ==
=== FIFA World Cup qualification ===
20 March AFC third round, Group B	South Korea	1–1	Oman	Goyang, South Korea
20:00 UTC+9	Hwang Hee-chan 41'	Report	Al-Busaidi 80'	Stadium: Goyang Stadium; Attendance: 35,212; Referee: Alireza Faghani (Australia)

25 March AFC third round, Group B	South Korea	1–1	Jordan	Suwon, South Korea
20:00 UTC+9	Lee Jae-sung 5'	Report	Kwon Kyung-won 30' (o.g.)	Stadium: Suwon World Cup Stadium; Attendance: 41,582; Referee: Ilgiz Tantashev (Uzbekistan)

5 June AFC third round, Group B	Iraq	0–2	South Korea	Basra, Iraq
21:15 UTC+3		Report	Kim Jin-gyu 63'; Oh Hyeon-gyu 82'	Stadium: Basra International Stadium; Attendance: 55,972; Referee: Yusuke Araki (Japan)

10 June AFC third round, Group B	South Korea	4–0	Kuwait	Seoul, South Korea
20:00 UTC+9	Al Hajeri 30' (o.g.); Lee Kang-in 51'; Oh Hyeon-gyu 54'; Lee Jae-sung 72'	Report		Stadium: Seoul World Cup Stadium; Attendance: 41,911; Referee: Majed Al-Shamrani (Saudi Arabia)

AFC third round, Group B table
Pos	Team	Pld	W	D	L	GF	GA	GD	Pts	Qualification
1	South Korea	10	6	4	0	20	7	+13	22	Qualification for World Cup
2	Jordan	10	4	4	2	16	8	+8	16	Qualification for World Cup
3	Iraq	10	4	3	3	9	9	0	15	Qualification for AFC fourth round
4	Oman	10	3	2	5	9	14	−5	11	Qualification for AFC fourth round
5	Palestine	10	2	4	4	10	13	−3	10	
6	Kuwait	10	0	5	5	7	20	−13	5	

Source: AFC FIFA
Rules for classification: Tiebreakers

=== EAFF Championship ===
==== Men's tournament ====
7 July	South Korea	3–0	China	Yongin, South Korea
20:00 UTC+9	Lee Dong-gyeong 8'; Joo Min-kyu 21'; Kim Ju-sung 56'	Report		Stadium: Yongin Mireu Stadium; Attendance: 4,426; Referee: Tuan Yaasin (Malaysia)

11 July	South Korea	2–0	Hong Kong	Yongin, South Korea
20:00 UTC+9	Kang Sang-yoon 27'; Lee Ho-jae 67'	Report		Stadium: Yongin Mireu Stadium; Attendance: 5,521; Referee: Ahmad A'Qashah (Singapore)

15 July	South Korea	0–1	Japan	Yongin, South Korea
19:24 UTC+9		Report	Germain 8'	Stadium: Yongin Mireu Stadium; Attendance: 18,418; Referee: Tuan Yaasin (Malaysia)

Pos	Team	Pld	W	D	L	GF	GA	GD	Pts
1	Japan (C)	3	3	0	0	9	1	+8	9
2	South Korea (H)	3	2	0	1	5	1	+4	6
3	China	3	1	0	2	1	5	−4	3
4	Hong Kong	3	0	0	3	1	9	−8	0

Source: EAFF
(C) Champions; (H) Hosts

==== Women's tournament ====
9 July	South Korea	2–2	China	Suwon, South Korea
20:00 UTC+9	Jang Sel-gi 45+1'; Ji So-yun 90+4'	report	Yao Wei 15'; Shao Ziqin 67'	Stadium: Suwon World Cup Stadium; Attendance: 923; Referee: Bùi Thị Thu Trang (Vietnam)

13 July	Japan	1–1	South Korea	Hwaseong, South Korea
20:00 UTC+9	Narumiya 37'	report	Jeong Da-bin 86'	Stadium: Hwaseong Sports Complex; Attendance: 1,641; Referee: Tam Ping Wun (Hong Kong)

16 July	South Korea	2–0	Chinese Taipei	Suwon, South Korea
19:30 UTC+9	Ji So-yun 70' (pen.); Jang Sel-gi 85'	report		Stadium: Suwon World Cup Stadium; Attendance: 597; Referee: Khin Nyein Chan (Myanmar)

Pos	Team	Pld	W	D	L	GF	GA	GD	Pts
1	South Korea (C, H)	3	1	2	0	5	3	+2	5 (Note: Head-to-head goals scored: South Korea 3, China 2, Japan 1.)
2	China	3	1	2	0	6	4	+2	5
3	Japan	3	1	2	0	5	1	+4	5
4	Chinese Taipei	3	0	0	3	2	10	−8	0

Source: EAFF
(C) Champions; (H) Hosts

=== AFC U-23 Asian Cup qualification ===
3 September	South Korea	5–0	Macau	Sidoarjo, Indonesia
15:30 UTC+7	Jeong Jae-sang 14', 49' (pen.); Park Seung-ho 45+4'; Kang Seong-jin 58'; Seo Jae-min 88'	Report		Stadium: Gelora Delta Stadium; Attendance: 106

6 September	Laos	0–7	South Korea	Sidoarjo, Indonesia
15:30 UTC+7		Report	Jung Ji-hun 44'; Lee Kyu-dong 45+4'; Cho Sang-hyeok 49', 60', 90+2'; Park Seung-ho 69' (pen.); Hwang Do-yoon 70'	Stadium: Gelora Delta Stadium; Attendance: 249

9 September	South Korea	1–0	Indonesia	Sidoarjo, Indonesia
19:30 UTC+7	Hwang Do-yoon 6'	Report		Stadium: Gelora Delta Stadium

Group J table
Pos	Team	Pld	W	D	L	GF	GA	GD	Pts	Qualification
1	South Korea	3	3	0	0	13	0	+13	9	Qualification for U-23 Asian Cup
2	Indonesia (H)	3	1	1	1	5	1	+4	4	
3	Laos	3	1	1	1	3	8	−5	4	
4	Macau	3	0	0	3	1	13	−12	0	

Source: AFC
Rules for classification: Tiebreakers
(H) Hosts

=== Friendlies ===
==== Senior team ====
6 September	United States	0–2	South Korea	Harrison, United States
17:00 UTC−4		Report	Son Heung-min 18'; Lee Dong-gyeong 43'	Stadium: Sports Illustrated Stadium; Attendance: 26,500; Referee: Reon Radix (Grenada)

9 September	Mexico	2–2	South Korea	Nashville, United States
20:00 UTC−5	Jiménez 22'; Giménez 90+4'	Report	Son Heung-min 65'; Oh Hyeon-gyu 75'	Stadium: Geodis Park; Attendance: 27,604; Referee: Guido Gonzales Jr. (United States)

10 October	South Korea	0–5	Brazil	Seoul, South Korea
20:00 UTC+9		Report	Estêvão 13', 47'; Rodrygo 41', 49'; Vinícius 77'	Stadium: Seoul World Cup Stadium; Attendance: 63,237; Referee: Abdulrahman Al-Jassim (Qatar)

14 October	South Korea	2–0	Paraguay	Seoul, South Korea
20:00 UTC+9	Eom Ji-sung 15'; Oh Hyeon-gyu 75'	Report		Stadium: Seoul World Cup Stadium; Attendance: 22,206; Referee: Yusuke Araki (Japan)

14 November	South Korea	2–0	Bolivia	Daejeon, South Korea
20:00 UTC+9	Son Heung-min 57'; Cho Gue-sung 88'	Report		Stadium: Daejeon World Cup Stadium; Attendance: 33,852; Referee: Ma Ning (China)

18 November	South Korea	1–0	Ghana	Seoul, South Korea
20:00 UTC+9	Lee Tae-seok 63'	Report		Stadium: Seoul World Cup Stadium; Attendance: 33,256; Referee: Ahmed Al-Ali (Kuwait)

==== Under-23 team ====
20 March CFA Team China 2025	South Korea	1–1	Vietnam	Yancheng, China
14:30 UTC+8	Kim Woo-bin 90+5'	Report	Nguyễn Thanh Nhàn 53'	Stadium: Yancheng Sports Center Stadium

23 March CFA Team China 2025	China	1–0	South Korea	Yancheng, China
14:30 UTC+8	Liu Haofan 85'			Stadium: Yancheng Sports Center Stadium

25 March CFA Team China 2025	South Korea	3–1	Uzbekistan	Yancheng, China
14:30 UTC+8	Hwang In-taek 27'; Lee Seung-won 73' (pen.); Moon Min-seo 90+5'		Turdimurodov 90+3'	Stadium: Yancheng Sports Center Stadium

5 June	South Korea	0–0	Australia	Yongin, South Korea
19:00 UTC+9		Report		Stadium: Yongin Mireu Stadium; Attendance: 2,135; Referee: Kim Woo-sung (South Korea)

9 June	South Korea	0–2	Australia	Siheung, South Korea
13:00 UTC+9		Report	Kuol 6'; Lopane 21'	Stadium: Jeongwang Stadium; Attendance: 0

10 October	Saudi Arabia	4–0	South Korea	Al-Ahsa, Saudi Arabia
16:30 UTC+3	Al-Aliwa 40', 61'; Al-Julaydan 49'; Al-Subiani 64'	Report		Stadium: Prince Abdullah bin Jalawi Stadium

14 October	Saudi Arabia	2–0	South Korea	Al-Ahsa, Saudi Arabia
16:30 UTC+3	Al-Nemer 45' (pen.); Abdullah 79' (pen.)	Report		Stadium: Prince Abdullah bin Jalawi Stadium

12 November Panda Cup	South Korea	2–0	Uzbekistan	Chengdu, China
15:30 UTC+8	Jung Seung-bae 56'; Kim Myung-jun 88'	Report		Stadium: Shuangliu Sports Centre

15 November Panda Cup	China	2–0	South Korea	Chengdu, China
19:35 UTC+8	Behram Abduweli 71', 81'	Report		Stadium: Shuangliu Sports Centre; Attendance: 10,089; Referee: Tang Shunqi (China)

18 November Panda Cup	Vietnam	0–1	South Korea	Chengdu, China
15:30 UTC+8		Report	Kim Myung-jun 34'	Stadium: Shuangliu Sports Centre

==== Women's team ====
20 February Pink Ladies Cup	South Korea	3–0	Uzbekistan	Al Hamriyah, UAE
11:00 GST (UTC+4)	Choo Hyo-joo 42', 45+3'; Choe Yu-ri 90+2'	Report		Stadium: Hamriyah CSC Stadium

23 February Pink Ladies Cup	Thailand	0–4	South Korea	Al Hamriyah, UAE
15:00 GST (UTC+4)		Report	Lee Geum-min 24'; Choe Yu-ri 32'; Ji So-yun 45+2'; Moon Eun-ju 77'	Stadium: Hamriyah CSC Stadium

26 February Pink Ladies Cup	India	0–3	South Korea	Al Hamriyah, UAE
11:00 GST (UTC+4)		Report	Choi Yoo-jeong 8'; Choi Da-gyeong 27'; Moon Eun-ju 81'	Stadium: Hamriyah CSC Stadium

4 April	Australia	1–0	South Korea	Sydney, Australia
20:00 UTC+11	Lim Seon-joo 54' (o.g.)	Report		Stadium: Allianz Stadium; Attendance: 37,199; Referee: Yoshimi Yamashita (Japan)

7 April	Australia	2–0	South Korea	Newcastle, Australia
19:30 UTC+10	Fowler 43'; Lim Seon-joo 63' (o.g.)	Report		Stadium: McDonald Jones Stadium; Attendance: 28,019; Referee: Asaka Koizumi (Japan)

30 May	South Korea	0–1	Colombia	Incheon, South Korea
19:00 UTC+9		Report	Usme 26'	Stadium: Incheon Namdong Asiad Rugby Field; Attendance: 912; Referee: Koizumi Asaka (Japan)

2 June	South Korea	1–1	Colombia	Yongin, South Korea
19:00 UTC+9	Jung Min-young 2'	Report	Kim Jin-hui 63' (o.g.)	Stadium: Yongin Mireu Stadium; Attendance: 742; Referee: Yoshimi Yamashita (Japan)

28 November	Wales	1–1	South Korea	Málaga, Spain
19:00	Ingle 4'	Report	Kim Min-ji 67'	Referee: Caroline Lanssens (Belgium)

2 December	Netherlands	5–0	South Korea	Waalwijk, Netherlands
20:45	Miedema 9', 17', 31', 38'; Peddemors 43'	Report

== Leagues ==
=== K League 1 ===
Pos	Team	Pld	W	D	L	GF	GA	GD	Pts	Qualification or relegation (Note: Teams played each other three times (33 matches), before the league was split into two groups, the top six and the bottom six.)
1	Jeonbuk Hyundai Motors (C)	38	23	10	5	64	32	+32	79	Qualification for Champions League Elite league stage
2	Daejeon Hana Citizen	38	18	11	9	58	46	+12	65	Qualification for Champions League Elite league stage
3	Gimcheon Sangmu (Note: Military-owned team Gimcheon Sangmu cannot qualify for AFC competitions.)	38	18	7	13	59	45	+14	61	
4	Pohang Steelers	38	16	8	14	41	46	−5	56	Qualification for Champions League Elite league stage
5	Gangwon FC	38	13	13	12	37	41	−4	52	Qualification for Champions League Elite preliminary stage
6	FC Seoul	38	12	13	13	50	52	−2	49	Qualification for Champions League Two group stage
7	Gwangju FC	38	15	9	14	40	41	−1	54	
8	FC Anyang	38	14	7	17	49	47	+2	49	
9	Ulsan HD	38	11	11	16	42	50	−8	44	
10	Suwon FC (R)	38	11	9	18	51	58	−7	42	Qualification for relegation play-offs
11	Jeju SK (O)	38	10	9	19	40	53	−13	39	Qualification for relegation play-offs
12	Daegu FC (R)	38	7	13	18	47	67	−20	34	Relegation to K League 2

Source: Soccerway K League
Rules for classification: 1) Points; 2) Goals scored; 3) Goal difference; 4) Wins; 5) Head-to-head points
(C) Champions; (O) Play-off winners; (R) Relegated

=== K League 2 ===
==== Regular season ====
Pos	Team	Pld	W	D	L	GF	GA	GD	Pts	Promotion or qualification
1	Incheon United (C, P)	39	23	9	7	66	30	+36	78	Promotion to K League 1
2	Suwon Samsung Bluewings	39	20	12	7	76	50	+26	72	Qualification for promotion play-offs final round
3	Bucheon FC 1995 (O, P)	39	19	10	10	59	49	+10	67	Qualification for promotion play-offs second round
4	Seoul E-Land	39	17	14	8	64	43	+21	65	Qualification for promotion play-offs first round
5	Seongnam FC	39	17	13	9	46	32	+14	64	Qualification for promotion play-offs first round
6	Jeonnam Dragons	39	17	11	11	63	52	+11	62	
7	Gimpo FC	39	14	13	12	48	37	+11	55	
8	Busan IPark	39	14	13	12	47	46	+1	55	
9	Chungnam Asan	39	13	14	12	51	47	+4	53	
10	Hwaseong FC	39	9	13	17	36	50	−14	40	
11	Gyeongnam FC	39	11	7	21	34	58	−24	40	
12	Chungbuk Cheongju	39	7	10	22	30	62	−32	31	
13	Cheonan City	39	7	9	23	41	70	−29	30	
14	Ansan Greeners	39	5	12	22	25	60	−35	27	

Source: K League Soccerway
Rules for classification: 1) Points; 2) Goals scored; 3) Goal difference; 4) Wins; 5) Head-to-head points
(C) Champions; (O) Play-off winners; (P) Promoted

==== Promotion play-offs ====
First round
4	Seoul E-Land	0
5	Seongnam FC	1

Second round
3	Bucheon FC 1995	0
5	Seongnam FC	0

Final 2
Bucheon FC 1995	1	3	4
Suwon FC	0	2	2
Final 1
Suwon Samsung Bluewings	0	0	0
Jeju SK	1	2	3

=== K3 League ===
Pos	Team	Pld	W	D	L	GF	GA	GD	Pts	Promotion or relegation
1	Gimhae FC 2008 (C, P)	28	18	7	3	48	20	+28	61	Promotion to K League 2 (Note: Promoted after getting a license for K League 2.)
2	Siheung Citizen	28	17	6	5	45	25	+20	57	
3	Pocheon Citizen	28	16	7	5	47	28	+19	55	
4	Daejeon Korail	28	14	7	7	48	32	+16	49	
5	Gyeongju KHNP	28	12	9	7	34	29	+5	45	
6	Busan Transportation Corporation	28	14	2	12	35	34	+1	44	
7	Changwon FC	28	12	7	9	31	23	+8	43	
8	Yangpyeong FC	28	13	4	11	27	24	+3	43	
9	Yeoju FC	28	10	6	12	31	35	−4	36	
10	Paju Citizen (P)	28	10	6	12	27	32	−5	36	Promotion to K League 2
11	Gangneung Citizen	28	8	7	13	38	45	−7	31	
12	Chuncheon FC	28	9	3	16	27	37	−10	30	
13	Ulsan Citizen	28	5	6	17	20	38	−18	21	
14	Jeonbuk Hyundai Motors N	28	5	5	18	28	51	−23	20	
15	FC Mokpo (O)	28	4	4	20	18	51	−33	16	Qualification for relegation play-off

Source: JoinKFA Sofascore
Rules for classification: 1) Points; 2) Goal difference; 3) Goals scored; 4) Wins
(C) Champions; (O) Play-off winners; (P) Promoted

=== K4 League ===
==== Regular season ====
Pos	Team	Pld	W	D	L	GF	GA	GD	Pts	Promotion
1	Dangjin Citizen (C, P)	30	16	3	11	72	54	+18	51	Promotion to 2026 K3 League
2	Namyangju FC	30	15	6	9	47	33	+14	51	Qualification for promotion play-off
3	Pyeongchang United	30	13	10	7	49	38	+11	49	
4	Jinju Citizen	30	14	7	9	55	48	+7	49	
5	Gijang United	30	15	4	11	45	40	+5	49	
6	Geoje Citizen	30	14	6	10	63	49	+14	48	
7	Daegu FC B	30	13	9	8	44	30	+14	48	
8	Yeoncheon FC	30	10	7	13	39	61	−22	37	
9	Pyeongtaek Citizen	30	8	8	14	46	64	−18	32	
10	Sejong SA	30	7	8	15	45	56	−11	29	
11	Seoul Jungnang	30	4	4	22	44	76	−32	16	

Source: JoinKFA Soccerway
Rules for classification: 1) Points; 2) Goal difference; 3) Goals scored; 4) Wins
(C) Champions; (P) Promoted

==== Promotion play-off ====
The promotion play-off was contested between the 15th-placed team of K3 League and the runners-up of K4 League.

22 November 2025
14:00 (UTC+9)

FC Mokpo	1–0	Namyangju FC
Ryu Yeon-joon 63'	Report

Mokpo International Football Center, Mokpo

=== WK League ===
==== Regular season ====
Pos	Team	Pld	W	D	L	GF	GA	GD	Pts	Qualification
1	Hwacheon KSPO	28	16	9	3	56	23	+33	57	Qualification for Championship
2	Seoul City	28	15	9	4	48	28	+20	54	Qualification for Play-off
3	Incheon Hyundai Steel Red Angels	28	13	9	6	35	26	+9	48	Qualification for Play-off
4	Gyeongju KHNP	28	12	7	9	47	38	+9	43	
5	Sejong Sportstoto	28	9	9	10	30	32	−2	36	
6	Mungyeong Sangmu	28	8	8	12	35	37	−2	32	
7	Suwon FC	28	5	9	14	27	45	−18	24	
8	Changnyeong WFC	28	2	4	22	17	66	−49	10	

Source: Soccerway

==== Championship play-offs ====
Play-off (Semi-final)			Championship (Finals)
			1	Hwacheon KSPO	3	4	7
2	Seoul City	0		Seoul City	2	3	5
3	Incheon Hyundai Steel Red Angels	0

==== Final table ====
Pos	Team	Qualification
1	Hwacheon KSPO (C)	Qualification for Champions League
2	Seoul City	
3	Incheon Hyundai Steel Red Angels	

(C) Champions

== Domestic cups ==
=== Korea Cup ===
Round of 16 (Fourth round)
Suwon FC	1 (3)
Gwangju FC (p)	1 (4)
Ulsan HD	3
Incheon United	0
Gimpo FC	2
Pohang Steelers	1
Bucheon FC 1995 (a.e.t.)	3
Gimcheon Sangmu	1
Daejeon Korail	1
FC Seoul	2
Daejeon Hana Citizen	2
Jeonbuk Hyundai Motors	3
FC Anyang	1
Daegu FC	2
Gangwon FC	2
Siheung Citizen	1

Quarter-finals (Fifth round)
Gwangju FC	1
Ulsan HD	0
Gimpo FC	1
Bucheon FC 1995	3
FC Seoul	0
Jeonbuk Hyundai Motors	1
Daegu FC	1
Gangwon FC	2

Semi-finals (Sixth round)
Gwangju FC	2	2	4
Bucheon FC 1995	0	1	1
Jeonbuk Hyundai Motors	1	2	3
Gangwon FC	1	1	2

Final (Seventh round)
Gwangju FC	1
Jeonbuk Hyundai Motors (a.e.t.)	2

== International cups ==
=== AFC Champions League Elite ===
==== 2024–25 season ====
The previous six league stage matches were held in 2024.

Team	Result	Round	Aggregate	Score	Venue	Opponent
Gwangju FC	Quarter-finals	League East	Fourth place	~~1–3~~ Cancelled	Away	(China) Shandong Taishan
Gwangju FC	Quarter-finals	League East	Fourth place	2–2	Home	(Thailand) Buriram United
Gwangju FC	Quarter-finals	Round of 16	3–2	0–2	Away	(Japan) Vissel Kobe
Gwangju FC	Quarter-finals	Round of 16	3–2	3–0 (a.e.t.)	Home	(Japan) Vissel Kobe
Gwangju FC	Quarter-finals	Quarter-finals	0–7	0–7	—	(Saudi Arabia) Al-Hilal
Pohang Steelers	League stage	League East	Ninth place	0–4	Home	(Japan) Kawasaki Frontale
Pohang Steelers	League stage	League East	Ninth place	2–5	Away	(Malaysia) Johor Darul Ta'zim
Ulsan HD	League stage	League East	Tenth place	1–2	Away	(Thailand) Buriram United
Ulsan HD	League stage	League East	Tenth place	Cancelled	Home	(China) Shandong Taishan

==== 2025–26 season ====
The other two league stage matches and the next rounds were held in 2026.

Team	Round	Score	Venue	Opponent
FC Seoul	League East	1–1	Away	(Japan) Machida Zelvia
FC Seoul	League East	3–0	Home	(Thailand) Buriram United
FC Seoul	League East	0–2	Away	(China) Shanghai Shenhua
FC Seoul	League East	0–0	Home	(China) Chengdu Rongcheng
FC Seoul	League East	3–1	Away	(China) Shanghai Port
FC Seoul	League East	1–1	Home	(Australia) Melbourne City
Gangwon FC	League East	2–1	Home	(China) Shanghai Shenhua
Gangwon FC	League East	0–1	Away	(China) Chengdu Rongcheng
Gangwon FC	League East	4–3	Home	(Japan) Vissel Kobe
Gangwon FC	League East	0–1	Away	(Japan) Sanfrecce Hiroshima
Gangwon FC	League East	1–3	Home	(Japan) Machida Zelvia
Gangwon FC	League East	2–2	Away	(Thailand) Buriram United
Ulsan HD	League East	2–1	Home	(China) Chengdu Rongcheng
Ulsan HD	League East	1–1	Away	(China) Shanghai Shenhua
Ulsan HD	League East	1–0	Home	(Japan) Sanfrecce Hiroshima
Ulsan HD	League East	0–1	Away	(Japan) Vissel Kobe
Ulsan HD	League East	0–0	Home	(Thailand) Buriram United
Ulsan HD	League East	1–3	Away	(Japan) Machida Zelvia

=== AFC Champions League Two ===
==== 2024–25 season ====
The previous group stage matches were held in 2024.

Team	Result	Round	Aggregate	Score	Venue	Opponent
Jeonbuk Hyundai Motors	Quarter-finals	Round of 16	5–0	4–0	Away	(Thailand) Port
Jeonbuk Hyundai Motors	Quarter-finals	Round of 16	5–0	1–0	Home	(Thailand) Port
Jeonbuk Hyundai Motors	Quarter-finals	Quarter-finals	2–5	0–2	Home	(Australia) Sydney FC
Jeonbuk Hyundai Motors	Quarter-finals	Quarter-finals	2–5	2–3	Away	(Australia) Sydney FC

==== 2025–26 season ====
The next rounds after the group stage were held in 2026.

Team	Result	Round	Aggregate	Score	Venue	Opponent
Pohang Steelers	Knockout stage	Group H	Runners-up	1–0	Away	(Thailand) BG Pathum United
Pohang Steelers	Knockout stage	Group H	Runners-up	2–0	Home	(Thailand) BG Pathum United
Pohang Steelers	Knockout stage	Group H	Runners-up	2–0	Home	(Philippines) Kaya–Iloilo
Pohang Steelers	Knockout stage	Group H	Runners-up	1–0	Away	(Philippines) Kaya–Iloilo
Pohang Steelers	Knockout stage	Group H	Runners-up	0–1	Away	(Singapore) Tampines Rovers
Pohang Steelers	Knockout stage	Group H	Runners-up	1–1	Home	(Singapore) Tampines Rovers

=== FIFA Club World Cup ===
Team	Result	Round	Aggregate	Score	Venue	Opponent
Ulsan HD	Group stage	Group F	Fourth place	0–1	—	(South Africa) Mamelodi Sundowns
Ulsan HD	Group stage	Group F	Fourth place	2–4	—	(Brazil) Fluminense
Ulsan HD	Group stage	Group F	Fourth place	0–1	—	(Germany) Borussia Dortmund

=== AFC Women's Champions League ===
==== 2024–25 season ====
The previous group stage matches were held in 2024.

Team	Result	Round	Aggregate	Score	Venue	Opponent
Incheon Hyundai Steel Red Angels	Semi-finals	Quarter-finals	1–0	1–0	—	(Iran) Bam Khatoon
Incheon Hyundai Steel Red Angels	Semi-finals	Semi-finals	0–1	0–1	—	(Australia) Melbourne City

==== 2025–26 season ====
The next rounds after the group stage were held in 2026.

Team	Result	Round	Aggregate	Score	Venue	Opponent
Suwon FC	Knockout stage	Group C	Third place	5–0	—	(Myanmar) ISPE
Suwon FC	Knockout stage	Group C	Third place	0–3	—	(North Korea) Naegohyang
Suwon FC	Knockout stage	Group C	Third place	0–0	—	(Japan) Tokyo Verdy Beleza

== See also ==
- Football in South Korea
- Women's football in South Korea
