= 2026 in South Korean football =

Football in South Korea
- Season: 2026

Men's football
- K League Super Cup: Jeonbuk Hyundai Motors

This article is a summary of the 2026 football season in South Korea. The season began on 28 February for the men's professional divisions K League 1 and K League 2. The third tier K3 League and fourth tier K4 League began on 7 March. The women's top tier WK League is due to start on 4 April.

== Domestic leagues ==
=== Team changes ===
Division	Promoted to	Relegated to	Newly joined	Withdrawn
K League 1	Incheon United; Bucheon FC 1995	—	—	—
K League 2	Gimhae FC 2008; Paju Frontier	Suwon FC; Daegu FC	Yongin FC	—
K3 League	Dangjin Citizen	—	—	—
K4 League	—	—	Geumsan Insam; Seosan Pioneer; Jecheon Citizen; Jincheon HR; Haman FC	Daegu FC B; Yeoncheon FC

=== K League 1 ===
Pos	Team	Pld	W	D	L	GF	GA	GD	Pts	Qualification or relegation (Note: Teams played each other three times (33 matches), before the league was split into two groups, the top six and the bottom six.)
1	FC Seoul (C, Q)	35	20	7	8	62	32	+30	67	Qualification for Champions League Elite league stage
2	Ulsan HD	35	17	6	12	56	49	+7	57	Qualification for Champions League Elite league stage
3	Daejeon Hana Citizen	35	14	11	10	55	41	+14	53	Qualification for Champions League Elite league stage
4	Gangwon FC	35	12	15	8	44	34	+10	51	Qualification for Champions League Elite play-off round
5	Jeonbuk Hyundai Motors	35	12	13	10	45	36	+9	49	
6	Incheon United	35	13	10	12	44	37	+7	49	
7	Jeju SK	35	12	12	11	41	39	+2	48	
8	FC Anyang	35	11	13	11	42	50	−8	46	
9	Pohang Steelers	35	11	11	13	33	42	−9	44	
10	Gimcheon Sangmu (Note: Military-owned team Gimcheon Sangmu cannot qualify for AFC competitions. Gimcheon Sangmu will be relegated to K League 2 2027 season regardless of their own final place.) (R)	35	6	20	9	35	42	−7	38	Relegation to K League 2
11	Bucheon FC 1995	35	7	12	16	35	51	−16	33	
12	Gwangju FC (Q)	35	3	14	18	32	71	−39	23	Qualification for relegation play-offs

Updated to match(es) played on 8 November 2026. Source: Soccerway K League
Rules for classification: 1) Points; 2) Goals scored; 3) Goal difference; 4) Wins; 5) Head-to-head points
(C) Champions; (Q) Qualified for the phase indicated; (R) Relegated

=== K League 2 ===
==== Regular season ====
Pos	Team	Pld	W	D	L	GF	GA	GD	Pts	Promotion or qualification
1	Suwon Samsung Bluewings (P)	30	20	6	4	52	25	+27	66	Promotion to K League 1
2	Suwon FC (T)	30	17	9	4	57	31	+26	60	Promotion to K League 1
3	Seoul E-Land (T)	30	17	6	7	57	38	+19	57	Qualification for the promotion play-offs
4	Daegu FC (T)	30	16	8	6	58	40	+18	56	Qualification for the promotion play-offs
5	Busan IPark	30	14	6	10	47	38	+9	48	Qualification for the promotion play-offs
6	Hwaseong FC	31	13	9	9	45	33	+12	48	Qualification for the promotion play-offs
7	Chungnam Asan	30	11	10	9	42	34	+8	43	
8	Gimpo FC (Z)	30	9	12	9	39	41	−2	39	
9	Gyeongnam FC (Z)	30	9	11	10	33	37	−4	38	
10	Paju Frontier (Z)	30	9	8	13	30	36	−6	35	
11	Cheonan City (Z)	30	7	12	11	38	41	−3	33	
12	Yongin FC (Z)	30	7	12	11	38	45	−7	33	
13	Chungbuk Cheongju (Z)	30	6	14	10	36	49	−13	32	
14	Seongnam FC (Z)	30	7	11	12	32	40	−8	32	
15	Ansan Greeners (Z)	31	7	5	19	35	59	−24	26	
16	Jeonnam Dragons (Z)	30	5	10	15	37	55	−18	25	
17	Gimhae FC 2008 (Z)	30	3	9	18	27	61	−34	18	

Updated to match(es) played on 8 November 2026. Source: K League Soccerway
Rules for classification: 1) Points; 2) Goals scored; 3) Goal difference; 4) Wins; 5) Head-to-head points
(P) Promoted; (T) Qualified, but not yet for the particular phase indicated; (Z) Secured 2027 K league 2

=== K3 League ===
==== League table ====
Pos	Team	Pld	W	D	L	GF	GA	GD	Pts	Promotion or relegation
1	Siheung Citizen	26	17	6	3	38	22	+16	57	Promotion to K League 2 (Note: Promotion is subject to obtaining a K League license.)
2	Pocheon Citizen	26	14	9	3	43	22	+21	51	
3	Daejeon Korail	26	13	6	7	37	21	+16	45	
4	Busan Transportation Corporation	26	12	7	7	46	31	+15	43	
5	Gyeongju KHNP	26	10	10	6	42	37	+5	40	
6	Dangjin Citizen	26	11	5	10	51	41	+10	38	
7	Chuncheon FC	26	10	6	10	45	40	+5	36	
8	Gangneung Citizen	26	10	6	10	27	33	−6	36	
9	Ulsan Citizen	26	8	6	12	25	28	−3	30	
10	Yeoju FC	26	7	9	10	31	35	−4	30	
11	Changwon FC	26	7	9	10	27	32	−5	30	
12	FC Mokpo	26	5	11	10	24	40	−16	26	
13	Yangpyeong FC	26	4	8	14	32	53	−21	20	
14	Jeonbuk Hyundai Motors N	26	1	8	17	27	60	−33	11	Qualification for relegation play-off (Note: Relegation play-off against K4 League runners-up.)

Source: JoinKFA
Rules for classification: 1) Points; 2) Goal difference; 3) Goals scored; 4) Wins

=== K4 League ===
==== Regular season ====
Pos	Team	Pld	W	D	L	GF	GA	GD	Pts	Promotion
1	Jinju Citizen	23	16	3	4	51	19	+32	51	Promotion to 2027 K3 League
2	Jincheon HR	23	13	6	4	44	21	+23	45	Qualification for promotion play-off
3	Namyangju FC	23	11	6	6	32	29	+3	39	
4	Geoje Citizen	23	11	4	8	42	28	+14	37	
5	Seoul Jungnang	24	11	4	9	40	32	+8	37	
6	Geumsan Insam	23	9	9	5	37	27	+10	36	
7	Jecheon Citizen	23	9	7	7	30	32	−2	34	
8	Pyeongchang United	23	9	3	11	30	35	−5	30	
9	Sejong SA	23	9	3	11	37	51	−14	30	
10	Gijang United	23	9	2	12	33	44	−11	29	
11	Haman FC	23	7	2	14	25	38	−13	23	
12	Pyeongtaek Citizen	23	4	5	14	29	48	−19	17	
13	Seosan Pioneer	23	4	2	17	24	50	−26	14	

Updated to match(es) played on 1 November 2026. Source: JoinKFA
Rules for classification: 1) Points; 2) Goal difference; 3) Goals scored; 4) Wins

== Domestic cups ==
=== Korea Cup ===
The KFA announced a restructuring of the Korea Cup ahead of the 2026 season, with the competition switching fron a spring-autumn format to an autumn-spring format. The first four rounds of the 2026-27 Korea Cup are expected to take place in July and August 2026.

=== K League Super Cup ===
The K League Super Cup returned to the footballing calendar after a 20-year hiatus. It was contested between previous year's Double winners Jeonbuk Hyundai Motors and 2025 K League 1 runners-up Daejeon Hana Citizen on 21 February at Jeonju World Cup Stadium.

21 February
14:00

Jeonbuk Hyundai Motors	2–0	Daejeon Hana Citizen
Mota 32'; Orobó 67'	Report

Jeonju World Cup Stadium, Jeonju
Attendance: 17,937
Referee: Go Hyung-jin

=== K3·K4 Championship ===
First round
Jeonbuk Hyundai Motors N	0
Yeoju FC	1
Sejong SA	2
Yangpyeong FC	0
Gijang United	Bye
—	—
Pyeongchang United	0
Busan Transportation Corporation	2
Siheung Citizen	2
Jincheon HR	1
Dangjin Citizen	Bye
—	—
Namyangju FC	3
Ulsan Citizen (a.e.t.)	4
Seosan Pioneer	0
Daejeon Korail	1
Seoul Jungnang	Bye
—	—
Chuncheon FC	2
FC Mokpo	1
Geoje Citizen	4
Geumsan Insam	1
Pyeongtaek Citizen	0
Jecheon Citizen	2
Gyeongju KHNP	Bye
—	—
Jinju Citizen	2
Haman FC	1
FC Gangneung	1
Pocheon Citizen	2
Changwon FC	Bye
—	—

Round of 16
Yeoju FC	4
Sejong SA	3
Gijang United	0
Busan Transportation Corporation	3
Siheung Citizen	1
Dangjin Citizen	0
Ulsan Citizen (p)	2 (5)
Daejeon Korail	2 (4)
Seoul Jungnang	1
Chuncheon FC	6
Geoje Citizen (p)	1 (5)
Jecheon Citizen	1 (4)
Gyeongju KHNP	3
Jinju Citizen	2
Pocheon Citizen	3
Changwon FC	2

Quarter-finals
Yeoju FC	0
Busan Transportation Corporation	2
Siheung Citizen	0
Ulsan Citizen	1
Chuncheon FC	1
Geoje Citizen	2
Gyeongju KHNP	2
Pocheon Citizen	5

Semi-finals
Busan Transportation Corporation	1
Ulsan Citizen	0
Geoje Citizen	1
Pocheon Citizen	2

Final
Busan Transportation Corporation	1
Pocheon Citizen	0

=== W Korea Cup ===
The KFA established the W Korea Cup in the 2026 season, with fifteen teams taking part across four rounds of competition between June and November 2026.

==== Round 1 ====
Team 1	Score	Team 2
Suwon FC	2-0	Gyeongju KHNP
Ulsan College	2-1	Dankook University
Daeduk University	0-2	Uiduk University
Korea University	1-2 (a.e.t.)	Seoul City
Gangwon State University	0-6	Sejong Sportstoto
Gangjin Swans	0-2	Mungyeong Sangmu
Incheon Hyundai Steel	4-0	Daekyeung University

Hwacheon KSPO received a bye to the second round as 2025 WK League champions.

== International club competitions ==
=== AFC Champions League Elite ===
==== 2025–26 season ====
The league stage matches until matchday 6 were held in 2025.

10 February League stage, East	Vissel Kobe (Japan)	2–0	(South Korea) FC Seoul	Kobe, Japan
19:00 UTC+9	Muto 69'; G. Sakai 73'	Report		Stadium: Kobe City Misaki Park Stadium; Attendance: 7,159; Referee: Nazmi Nasaruddin (Malaysia)

11 February League stage, East	Gangwon FC (South Korea)	0–0	(China) Shanghai Port	Chuncheon, South Korea
19:00 UTC+9		Report		Stadium: Chuncheon Songam Sports Town Stadium; Attendance: 2,527; Referee: Ahmad Al-Ali (Kuwait)

11 February League stage, East	Ulsan HD (South Korea)	1–2	(Australia) Melbourne City	Ulsan, South Korea
19:00 UTC+9	Bojanic 80'	Report	Caputo 36'; Younis 90+3'	Stadium: Ulsan Munsu Football Stadium; Attendance: 3,750; Referee: Ahmed Al-Kaf (Oman)

17 February League stage, East	FC Seoul (South Korea)	2–2	(Japan) Sanfrecce Hiroshima	Seoul, South Korea
19:00 UTC+9	Klimala 10' (pen.); Arai 27' (o.g.)	Report	Germain 90+3'; Kinoshita 90+6'	Stadium: Mokdong Stadium; Attendance: 7,441; Referee: Khalid Al-Turais (Saudi Arabia)

18 February League stage, East	Shanghai Port (China)	0–0	(South Korea) Ulsan HD	Shanghai, China
18:00 UTC+8		Report		Stadium: Pudong Football Stadium; Attendance: 15,103; Referee: Adel Al-Naqbi (United Arab Emirates)

18 February League stage, East	Melbourne City (Australia)	0–0	(South Korea) Gangwon FC	Melbourne, Australia
21:00 UTC+11		Report		Stadium: Melbourne Rectangular Stadium; Attendance: 936; Referee: Mohammed Al-Shammari (Qatar)

League stage, East table
Pos	Team	Pld	W	D	L	GF	GA	GD	Pts	Qualification
1	(Japan) Machida Zelvia	8	5	2	1	15	7	+8	17	Advance to knockout stage
2	(Japan) Vissel Kobe	8	5	1	2	14	7	+7	16	Advance to knockout stage
3	(Japan) Sanfrecce Hiroshima	8	4	3	1	10	6	+4	15	Advance to knockout stage
4	(Thailand) Buriram United	8	4	2	2	10	8	+2	14	Advance to knockout stage
5	(Australia) Melbourne City	8	4	2	2	9	7	+2	14	Advance to knockout stage
6	(Malaysia) Johor Darul Ta'zim	8	3	2	3	8	7	+1	11	Advance to knockout stage
7	(South Korea) FC Seoul (A)	8	2	4	2	10	9	+1	10	Advance to knockout stage
8	(South Korea) Gangwon FC (A)	8	2	3	3	9	11	−2	9	Advance to knockout stage
9	(South Korea) Ulsan HD (E)	8	2	3	3	6	8	−2	9	
10	(China) Chengdu Rongcheng	8	1	3	4	7	11	−4	6	
11	(China) Shanghai Shenhua	8	1	1	6	5	13	−8	4	
12	(China) Shanghai Port	8	0	4	4	2	11	−9	4	

Source: AFC
Rules for classification: 1) Points; 2) Goal difference; 3) Goals scored; 4) Matches won; 5) Penalty shoot-out if only two teams remain tied and played each other on the final matchday; 6) Fair play ranking; 7) Drawing of lots
(A) Advance to a further round; (E) Eliminated

3 March Round of 16	Gangwon FC (South Korea)	0–0	(Japan) Machida Zelvia	Chuncheon, South Korea
19:00 UTC+9		Report		Stadium: Chuncheon Songam Sports Town Stadium; Attendance: 2,675; Referee: Ahmad A'Qashah (Singapore)

4 March Round of 16	FC Seoul (South Korea)	0–1	(Japan) Vissel Kobe	Seoul, South Korea
19:00 UTC+9		Report	Thuler 23'	Stadium: Seoul World Cup Stadium; Attendance: 6,508; Referee: Khaled Al-Hoish (Saudi Arabia)

10 March Round of 16	Machida Zelvia (Japan)	1–0 (1–0 agg.)	(South Korea) Gangwon FC	Machida, Japan
19:00 UTC+9	Nakamura 25'	Report		Stadium: Machida City Nozuta Park Stadium; Attendance: 4,345; Referee: Rustam Lutfullin (Uzbekistan)

11 March Round of 16	Vissel Kobe (Japan)	2–1 (3–1 agg.)	(South Korea) FC Seoul	Kobe, Japan
19:00 UTC+9	Osako 78'; Ideguchi 89'	Report	Klimala 20'	Stadium: Kobe City Misaki Park Stadium; Attendance: 14,750; Referee: Alireza Faghani (Australia)

=== AFC Champions League Two ===
==== 2025–26 season ====
The group stage matches were held in 2025.

12 February Round of 16	Pohang Steelers (South Korea)	1–1	(Japan) Gamba Osaka	Pohang, South Korea
19:00 UTC+9	J. Teixeira 70'	Report	R. Yamashita 47'	Stadium: Pohang Steel Yard; Attendance: 4,589; Referee: Ahmad A'Qashah (Singapore)

19 February Round of 16	Gamba Osaka (Japan)	2–1 (3–2 agg.)	(South Korea) Pohang Steelers	Suita, Japan
19:00 UTC+9	Hümmet 34'; R. Yamashita 41'	Report	Nishiya 61'	Stadium: Suita City Football Stadium; Attendance: 9,456; Referee: Casey Reibelt (Australia)

=== AFC Women's Champions League ===
==== 2025–26 season ====
The group stage matches were held in 2025.

29 March Quarter-finals	Wuhan Jiangda (China)	0–4	(South Korea) Suwon FC	Wuhan, China
19:00 UTC+8		Report	Ji So-yun 11'; Suzuki 35'; Kim Hye-ri 47'; Jeon Min-ji 90+3'	Stadium: Hankou Cultural Sports Centre; Attendance: 5,869; Referee: Lê Thị Ly (Vietnam)

20 May Semi-finals	Naegohyang (North Korea)	2–1	(South Korea) Suwon FC	Suwon, South Korea
19:00 UTC+9	Choe Kum-ok 55'; Kim Kyong-yong 67'	Report	Suzuki 49'	Stadium: Suwon Sports Complex

==== 2026-27 season ====
1 November 2026 Group stage	Hwacheon KSPO (South Korea)	v	(North Korea) April 25	Kolkata, India
14:00 UTC+5:30				Stadium: Kishore Bharati Krirangan

4 November 2026 Group stage	East Bengal (India)	v	(South Korea) Hwacheon KSPO	Kolkata, India
18:00 UTC+5:30				Stadium: Kishore Bharati Krirangan

7 November 2026 Group stage	Hwacheon KSPO (South Korea)	v	(Vietnam) Hồ Chí Minh City	Kolkata, India
14:00 UTC+5:30				Stadium: Kishore Bharati Krirangan

== National teams ==
=== Men's senior ===
==== FIFA World Cup ====
After previous manager Jürgen Klinsmann, directly appointed by KFA president Chung Mong-gyu, was sacked for his lack of capability at the 2023 AFC Asian Cup, the KFA established their committee in charge of finding the next manager. At first, the selection committee tried negotiating with foreign managers including Jesse Marsch, who met KFA executives before choosing Canada. However, they changed their targets to domestic managers despite some committeemen's opposition, and then selected Hong Myung-bo, who had managed South Korea at the 2014 World Cup. President Chung, who preferred foreign manager, refused this recommendation and arbitrarily authorized another executive Lee Lim-saeng to negotiate with other nominees, but Lee reached the same conclusion. The announcement of Hong's appointment caused great controversy due to his poor result of the past, and Park Joo-ho, a committeeman who disagreed with this announcement, disclosed problems about the selection process through YouTube.

Chung stood trial for the violation of procedure, but Hong's appointment was not reversed. Hong led South Korea to qualify for the 2026 World Cup without a defeat in the qualifiers, but did not show steady results in friendlies against World Cup participants prior to the tournament. In the group stage, South Korea made a good start by defeating Czech Republic 2–1. Afterwards, however, opposing managers easily made countermeasures against Hong's unchanging tactics, and South Korea shiftlessly lost 1–0 to both Mexico and South Africa. Hong's lack of tactical change shocked South Korean media and fans, and he was strongly criticised for being eliminated in the group stage of the World Cup twice.

11 June Group A	South Korea	2–1	Czech Republic	Zapopan, Mexico
20:00 UTC−6	Hwang In-beom 67'; Oh Hyeon-gyu 80'	Report	Krejčí 59'	Stadium: Estadio Akron; Attendance: 44,985; Referee: Amin Mohamed Omar (Egypt)

18 June Group A	Mexico	1–0	South Korea	Zapopan, Mexico
19:00 UTC−6	Romo 50'	Report		Stadium: Estadio Akron; Attendance: 45,522; Referee: Gustavo Tejera (Uruguay)

24 June Group A	South Africa	1–0	South Korea	Guadalupe, Mexico
19:00 UTC−6	Maseko 63'	Report		Stadium: Estadio BBVA; Attendance: 51,243; Referee: Facundo Tello (Argentina)

Group A table
Pos	Team	Pld	W	D	L	GF	GA	GD	Pts	Qualification
1	Mexico (H)	3	3	0	0	6	0	+6	9	Advanced to knockout stage
2	South Africa	3	1	1	1	2	3	−1	4	Advanced to knockout stage
3	South Korea	3	1	0	2	2	3	−1	3	
4	Czech Republic	3	0	1	2	2	6	−4	1	

Source: FIFA
Rules for classification: Group stage tiebreakers
(H) Hosts

==== Friendlies ====
28 March	South Korea	0–4	Ivory Coast	Milton Keynes, England
14:00 UTC+0		Report	Guessand 35'; Adingra 45+1'; Godo 62'; Singo 90+3'	Stadium: Stadium MK; Attendance: 5,917; Referee: Ian McNabb (Northern Ireland)

31 March	Austria	1–0	South Korea	Vienna, Austria
20:45 UTC+2	Sabitzer 48'	Report		Stadium: Ernst-Happel-Stadion; Attendance: 35,300; Referee: Sander van der Eijk (Netherlands)

30 May	South Korea	5–0	Trinidad and Tobago	Provo, Utah, United States
19:00 UTC−6	Son Heung-min 40', 43' (pen.); Cho Gue-sung 65', 77'; Hwang Hee-chan 75' (pen.)	Report		Stadium: South Field; Attendance: 3,454; Referee: Victor Rivas (United States)

3 June	South Korea	1–0	El Salvador	Provo, Utah, United States
19:00 UTC−6	Lee Dong-gyeong 54'	Report		Stadium: South Field; Referee: Natalie Simon (United States)

=== Women's senior ===
==== AFC Women's Asian Cup ====
2 March Group A	South Korea	3–0	Iran	Gold Coast, Australia
19:00 UTC+10	Choe Yu-ri 37'; Kim Hye-ri 59' (pen.); Ko Yoo-jin 75'	Report		Stadium: Gold Coast Stadium; Attendance: 2,874; Referee: Veronika Bernatskaia (Kyrgyzstan)

5 March Group A	Philippines	0–3	South Korea	Gold Coast, Australia
13:00 UTC+10		Report	Jeon Yu-gyeong 12'; Park Soo-jeong 15'; Mun Eun-ju 56'	Stadium: Gold Coast Stadium; Attendance: 2,332; Referee: Lê Thị Ly (Vietnam)

8 March Group A	Australia	3–3	South Korea	Sydney, Australia
20:00 UTC+11	Kennedy 32', 90+8'; Kerr 45+6'	Report	Mun Eun-ju 13'; Kim Shin-ji 53' (pen.); Kang Chae-rim 56'	Stadium: Stadium Australia; Attendance: 60,279; Referee: Yoshimi Yamashita (Japan)

Group A table
Pos	Team	Pld	W	D	L	GF	GA	GD	Pts	Qualification
1	South Korea	3	2	1	0	9	3	+6	7	Advance to knockout stage
2	Australia (H)	3	2	1	0	8	3	+5	7	Advance to knockout stage
3	Philippines	3	1	0	2	2	4	−2	3	Advance to knockout stage
4	Iran	3	0	0	3	0	9	−9	0	

Source: AFC
(H) Hosts

14 March Quarter-finals	South Korea	6–0	Uzbekistan	Sydney, Australia
20:00 UTC+11	Son Hwa-yeon 9'; Ko Yoo-jin 20'; Park Soo-jeong 57'; Ji So-yun 72'; Lee Eun-young 85'; Jang Sel-gi 90+3' (pen.)	Report (AFC); Report (FIFA)		Stadium: Stadium Australia; Attendance: 12,974; Referee: Lara Lee (Australia)

18 March Semi-finals	South Korea	1–4	Japan	Sydney, Australia
20:00 UTC+11	Kang Chae-rim 78'	Report (AFC); Report (FIFA)	Ueki 15'; Hamano 25'; Kumagai 75'; Chiba 81'	Stadium: Stadium Australia; Attendance: 17,367; Referee: Veronika Bernatskaia (Kyrgyzstan)

==== EAFF Championship (preliminary) ====
3 June Group A	Guam	0–5	South Korea	Dededo, Guam
18:00 UTC+10		Report	Jang Yu-been 4', 28'; Son Hwa-yeon 6', 43'; Ko Yoo-jin 57'	Stadium: GFA National Training Center; Referee: Yoshimi Yamashita (Japan)

5 June Group A	Macau	0–13 (Note: Not recognised as an international "A" match due to players' lack of downtime, for which 48 or more hours were needed.)	South Korea	Dededo, Guam
14:30 UTC+10		Report	Kim Ji-yun 3'; Jang Yu-been 4', 53', 79'; Kim Ji-hyun 11', 22', 46'; Weng Lam Chong 49' (o.g.); Lee Min-hwa 57', 76'; Son Hwa-yeon 81'; Jang Sel-gi 86', 90'	Stadium: GFA National Training Center; Referee: Sugino Azusa (Japan)

Group A table
Pos	Team	Pld	W	D	L	GF	GA	GD	Pts	Qualification
1	South Korea	2	2	0	0	18	0	+18	6	Advance to final
2	Guam (H)	2	1	0	1	3	5	−2	3	
3	Macau	2	0	0	2	0	16	−16	0	

Source: EAFF
(H) Hosts

9 June Final	South Korea	5–3 (a.e.t.)	Chinese Taipei	Dededo, Guam
18:00 UTC+10	Yoon Su-jeong 50', 105'; Kim Hye-ri 53' (pen.); Jang Sel-gi 114'; Jeong Yu-jin 120'	Report (EAFF)	Hsu Yi-yun 54'; Chen Jin-wen 61'; Li Yi-wen 106'	Stadium: GFA National Training Center; Referee: Koizumi Asaka (Japan)

==== 2026 Asian Games ====
14 September 2026 Asian Games GS	South Korea	5–0	Myanmar	Osaka, Japan
19:30 UTC+9	Kim Min-ji 29', 33', 59'; Jang Sel-gi 38'; Choe Yu-ri 76'	Report		Stadium: Nagai Stadium; Attendance: 500; Referee: Tian Jin (China)

17 September 2026 Asian Games GS	Bangladesh	0–6	South Korea	Osaka, Japan
16:00 UTC+9		Report	Kim Min-ji 16'; Jeong Da-bin 42'; Choe Yu-ri 65'; Ji So-yun 77'; Hyun Seul-gi 79'; Ko Yoo-jin 90+1'	Stadium: Nagai Stadium; Attendance: 135; Referee: Fatemeh Nasiri Looshani (Iran)

21 September 2026 Asian Games GS	South Korea	1–1	North Korea	Fukuroi, Japan
16:00 UTC+9	Yoon Su-jeong 46'	Report	Chae Un-yong 35'	Stadium: Shizuoka Stadium; Attendance: 2,032; Referee: Supiree Testhomya (Thailand)

Group F table
Pos	Team	Pld	W	D	L	GF	GA	GD	Pts	Qualification
1	North Korea	3	2	1	0	19	1	+18	7	Advance to knockout stage
2	South Korea	3	2	1	0	12	1	+11	7	Advance to knockout stage
3	Myanmar	3	0	1	2	0	13	−13	1	
4	Bangladesh	3	0	1	2	0	16	−16	1	

Source: Aichi–Nagoya 26

25 September 2026 Asian Games QF	South Korea	6-3	Uzbekistan	Osaka, Japan
19:30 UTC+9	Yoon Su-jeong 6', 44'; Choe Yu-ri 17', 45+1'; Khabibullaeva 74' (o.g.); Kim Min-ji 90+4'	Report	Khabibullaeva 10'; Jang Sel-gi 64' (o.g.); Kudratova 66'	Stadium: Nagai Stadium; Attendance: 240; Referee: Mu Mingxin (China)

29 September 2026 Asian Games SF	Japan	2-0	South Korea	Fukuroi, Japan
19:30 UTC+9	Kamiya 54', 63'	Report		Stadium: Shizuoka Stadium; Attendance: 998; Referee: Lê Thị Ly (Vietnam)

2 October 2026 Asian Games bronze medal match	China	0-1	South Korea	Fukuroi, Japan
15:00 UTC+9	Kamiya 54', 63'	Report	Noh Jin-young 4'	Stadium: Shizuoka Stadium; Attendance: 1,331; Referee: Rawdha Al-Mansoori (United Arab Emirates)

==== Friendlies ====
11 April FIFA Series Brazil	Brazil	5–1	South Korea	Cuiabá, Brazil
21:30 UTC−4	Ary Borges 42'; Ludmila 47'; Dudinha 58'; Kerolin 61'; Maranhão 83'	Report (FIFA)	Park Soo-jeong 87'	Stadium: Arena Pantanal; Referee: Laura Fortunato (Argentina)

14 April FIFA Series Brazil	Canada	3–1	South Korea	Cuiabá, Brazil
15:30 UTC−4	Viens 23'; Gilles 50', 70'	Report (FIFA)	Kim Shin-ji 29'	Stadium: Arena Pantanal; Referee: Charly Deretti (Brazil)

18 April FIFA Series Brazil	South Korea	1–1	Zambia	Cuiabá, Brazil
15:30 UTC−4	Phair 45+3'	Report (FIFA)	Banda 26' (pen.)	Stadium: Arena Pantanal; Referee: Edina Batista (Brazil)

=== Men's under-23 ===
==== AFC U-23 Asian Cup ====
7 January Group C	South Korea	0–0	Iran	Riyadh, Saudi Arabia
14:30 UTC+3		Report		Stadium: Al-Shabab Club Stadium; Referee: Ammar Mahfoodh (Bahrain)

10 January Group C	Lebanon	2–4	South Korea	Riyadh, Saudi Arabia
14:30 UTC+3	Shahin 13'; El Fadl 48'	Report	Lee Hyun-yong 20'; Jeong Jae-sang 56'; Kang Seong-jin 71'; Kim Tae-won 76'	Stadium: Al-Shabab Club Stadium; Attendance: 588; Referee: Abdulla Al-Marri (Qatar)

13 January Group C	Uzbekistan	2–0	South Korea	Riyadh, Saudi Arabia
14:30 UTC+3	Karimov 48'; Saidnurullaev 70'	Report		Stadium: Prince Faisal bin Fahd Sports City Stadium; Attendance: 139; Referee: Qasim Al-Hatmi (Oman)

Group C table
Pos	Team	Pld	W	D	L	GF	GA	GD	Pts	Qualification
1	Uzbekistan	3	2	1	0	5	2	+3	7	Advance to knockout stage
2	South Korea	3	1	1	1	4	4	0	4	Advance to knockout stage
3	Lebanon	3	1	0	2	5	7	−2	3	
4	Iran	3	0	2	1	0	1	−1	2	

Source: AFC

17 January Quarter-finals	Australia	1–2	South Korea	Jeddah, Saudi Arabia
18:30	Jovanovic 51'	Report	Baek Ga-on 21'; Shin Min-ha 88'	Stadium: King Abdullah Sports City Hall Stadium; Attendance: 172; Referee: Fu Ming (China)

20 January Semi-finals	Japan	1–0	South Korea	Jeddah, Saudi Arabia
14:30	Koizumi 36'	Report		Stadium: King Abdullah Sports City Hall Stadium; Attendance: 188; Referee: Abdulla Al-Marri (Qatar)

23 January Third place match	Vietnam	2–2 (a.e.t.) (7–6 p)	South Korea	Jeddah, Saudi Arabia
18:00	Nguyễn Quốc Việt 30'; Nguyễn Đình Bắc 71'	Report	Kim Tae-won 69'; Shin Min-ha 90+7'	Stadium: King Abdullah Sports City Hall Stadium; Attendance: 270; Referee: Abdullah Jamali (Kuwait)
	Penalties
	Khuất Văn Khang (penalty scored); Phạm Minh Phúc (penalty scored); Nguyễn Thái Quốc Cường (penalty scored); Nguyễn Ngọc Mỹ (penalty scored); Nguyễn Nhật Minh (penalty scored); Nguyễn Xuân Bắc (penalty scored); Nguyễn Thanh Nhàn (penalty scored)		(penalty scored) Kim Tae-won; (penalty scored) Kang Seong-jin; (penalty scored) Lee Chan-wook; (penalty scored) Kim Yong-hak; (penalty scored) Lee Hyun-yong; (penalty scored) Jang Seok-hwan; (penalty missed) Bae Hyun-seo

==== Friendlies ====
29 March	South Korea	2–1	Japan	Cheonan, South Korea
17:00 UTC+9	Lee Young-jun 34', 49'	Report	Ishii 77'	Stadium: Korea Football Park

31 March	South Korea	1–4	United States	Cheonan, South Korea
19:00 UTC+9	Park Seung-ho 12' (pen.)	Report	Baker-Whiting 7', 33'; Brennan 15'; Castañeda 80'	Stadium: Korea Football Park

3 June	South Korea	1–1	United Arab Emirates	Thanyaburi, Thailand
20:00 UTC+7	Lee Seung-won 47'	Report	Saleh 50'	Stadium: True BG Stadium

6 June	Thailand	2–3	South Korea	Thanyaburi, Thailand
20:00 UTC+7	Buaphan 3'; Chansri 16'	Report	Kang Seong-jin 10'; Lee Young-jun 49'; Choi Woo-jin 79'	Stadium: True BG Stadium

9 June	South Korea	0–1	Kyrgyzstan	Thanyaburi, Thailand
20:00 UTC+7		Report	Madanov 81'	Stadium: True BG Stadium

=== Women's under-20 ===
==== AFC U-20 Women's Asian Cup ====
2 April Group B	South Korea	2–0	Uzbekistan	Nonthaburi, Thailand
16:00	Jin Hye-rin 43'; Cho Hye-young 72' (pen.)	Report		Stadium: Nonthaburi Province Stadium; Attendance: 18; Referee: Mu Mingxin (China)

5 April Group B	Jordan	1–2	South Korea	Nonthaburi, Thailand
16:00	Al Zurikat 51'	Report	Jin Hye-rin 41'; Lee Ha-eun 43'	Stadium: Nonthaburi Province Stadium; Attendance: 35; Referee: Ranjita Devi Teckham (India)

8 April Group B	North Korea	5–0	South Korea	Pathum Thani, Thailand
20:00	Kang Ryu-mi 37'; Pak Ok-i 45', 45+1'; Pak Il-sim 48'; Ho Kyong 51'	Report		Stadium: Pathum Thani Stadium; Attendance: 46; Referee: Mu Mingxin (China)

Group B table
Pos	Team	Pld	W	D	L	GF	GA	GD	Pts	Qualification
1	North Korea	3	3	0	0	19	0	+19	9	Advance to knockout stage
2	South Korea	3	2	0	1	4	6	−2	6	Advance to knockout stage
3	Uzbekistan	3	1	0	2	4	8	−4	3	Advance to knockout stage
4	Jordan	3	0	0	3	1	14	−13	0	

Source: AFC
Rules for classification: Group stage tiebreakers

12 April Quarter-finals	Thailand	1–2 (a.e.t.)	South Korea	Pathum Thani, Thailand
20:00	Casteen 72'	Report	Nam Seung-eun 16'; Park Ju-ha 106'	Stadium: Thammasat Stadium; Attendance: 574; Referee: Azusa Sugino (Japan)

15 April Semi-finals	North Korea	3–0	South Korea	Pathum Thani, Thailand
20:00	Pak Il-sim 24'; Kang Ryu-mi 34'; Choe Yon-a 84'	Report		Stadium: Thammasat Stadium; Attendance: 65; Referee: Nurul Ain Izatty Zainal (Malaysia)

=== Men's under-17 ===
==== AFC U-17 Asian Cup ====
6 May Group C	South Korea	1–1	United Arab Emirates	Jeddah, Saudi Arabia
20:30	Ahn Joo-wan 88'	Report	Al-Jneibi 8'	Stadium: King Abdullah Sports City Training Stadium (Pitch B); Attendance: 100; Referee: Adam Kersey (Australia)

10 May Group C	Vietnam	1–4	South Korea	Jeddah, Saudi Arabia
19:00	Lê Sỹ Bách 33'	Report	An Sun-hyun 84'; Ian Nam 86'; Ahn Joo-wan 88'; Kim Ji-woo 90+4'	Stadium: King Abdullah Sports City Training Stadium (Pitch C); Attendance: 100; Referee: Du Jianxin (China)

13 May Group C	South Korea	0–0	Yemen	Jeddah, Saudi Arabia
20:00		Report		Stadium: King Abdullah Sports City Training Stadium (Pitch B); Attendance: 252; Referee: Saud Al-Samhan (Kuwait)

Group C table
Pos	Team	Pld	W	D	L	GF	GA	GD	Pts	Qualification
1	Vietnam	3	2	0	1	5	6	−1	6	Advance to knockout stage
2	South Korea	3	1	2	0	5	2	+3	5	Advance to knockout stage
3	Yemen	3	1	1	1	3	3	0	4	
4	United Arab Emirates	3	0	1	2	5	7	−2	1	

Source: AFC
Rules for classification: Group stage tiebreakers

16 May Quarter-finals	Uzbekistan	2–2 (5–3 p)	South Korea	Jeddah, Saudi Arabia
19:00	Ravshanbekov 41', 45+2'	Report	Moon Ji-hwan 22'; An Sun-hyun 88'	Stadium: King Abdullah Sports City Training Stadium (Pitch C); Attendance: 81; Referee: Du Jianxin (China)
	Penalties
	Khakimov (penalty scored); Anvarov (penalty scored); Abdusoliev (penalty scored); Mamatov (penalty scored); Erkinov (penalty scored)		(penalty scored) Jung Ha-won; (penalty scored) Kim Ji-ho; (penalty scored) Ahn Joo-wan; (penalty missed) Park Kyung-hoon

=== Women's under-17 ===
==== AFC U-17 Women's Asian Cup ====
2 May Group C	South Korea	5–0	Philippines	Suzhou, China
15:30	Baek Seo-yeong 6', 14', 34', 55'; Kim Hee-na 67'	Report		Stadium: Suzhou Taihu Football Sports Centre Pitch 8 Attendance: 25; Referee: Yu Hong (China)

5 May Group C	Chinese Taipei	0–4	South Korea	Suzhou, China
15:30		Report	Chen You-yu 36' (o.g.); Lim Ji-hye 38'; Kim Min-seo 82'; Kim Hee-na 83'	Stadium: Suzhou Taihu Football Sports Centre Pitch 4 Attendance: 87; Referee: Keomany Phengmeuangkhoun (Laos)

8 May Group C	North Korea	3–0	South Korea	Suzhou, China
19:30	Eh Chong-gum 13'; Kim Won-sim 77', 82'	Report		Stadium: Suzhou Taihu Football Sports Centre Pitch 4 Attendance: 263; Referee: Maïka Vanderstichel (France)

Group C table
Pos	Team	Pld	W	D	L	GF	GA	GD	Pts	Qualification
1	North Korea	3	3	0	0	21	0	+21	9	Advance to knockout stage
2	South Korea	3	2	0	1	9	3	+6	6	Advance to knockout stage
3	Philippines	3	0	1	2	0	13	−13	1	
4	Chinese Taipei	3	0	1	2	0	14	−14	1	

Source: AFC
Rules for classification: Group stage tiebreakers

11 May Quarter-finals	Japan	1–0	South Korea	Suzhou, China
15:00	Higuchi 74'	Report		Stadium: Suzhou Taihu Football Sports Centre Pitch 1 Attendance: 81; Referee: Yu Hong (China)

== See also ==
- Football in South Korea
- Women's football in South Korea
