= Choe Yu-ri =

South Korean footballer (born 1994)

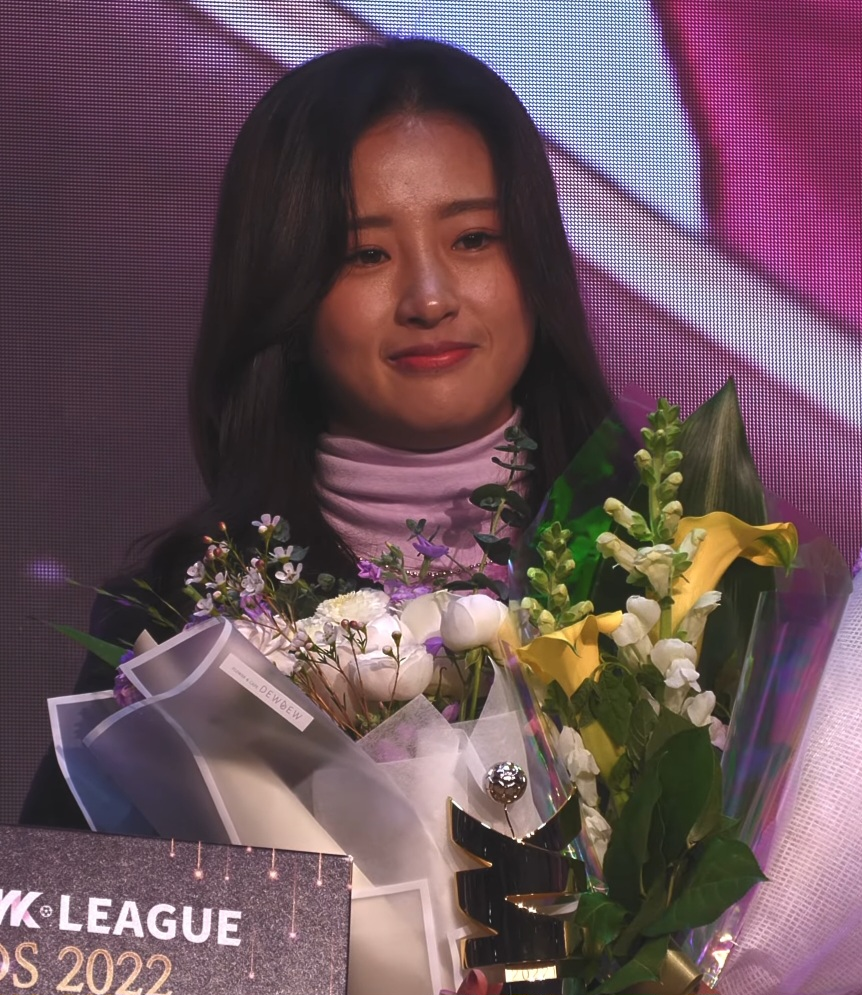

Personal information
- Full name: Choe Yu-ri
- Date of birth: 16 September 1994 (age 32)
- Place of birth: South Korea
- Height: 1.70 m (5 ft 7 in)
- Position: Forward

Team information
- Current team: Suwon FC
- Number: 11

Youth career
- 2007–2009: Hyundai Chungun Middle School
- 2010–2012: Hyundai Technical High School
- 2013–2014: Ulsan College

Senior career*
Years	Team	Apps	(Gls)
2016–2020	Sejong Sportstoto		
2021–2023	Hyundai Steel Red Angels		
2023–2025	Birmingham City	24	(2)
2025	Hyundai Steel Red Angels		
2026–	Suwon FC		

International career^{‡}
2011–2014	South Korea U20	22	(3)
2014–	South Korea	79	(18)
Medal record
Women's football
Representing South Korea
Asian Games
Bronze medal – third place	2014 Incheon	Team
Bronze medal – third place	2018 Jakarta–Palembang	Team
Bronze medal – third place	2026 Aichi–Nagoya	Team
- * Club domestic league appearances and goals ‡ National team caps and goals as of 2 October 2026

- Choe Yu-ri
- Hangul: 최유리
- Hanja: 崔有利
- RR: Choe Yuri
- MR: Ch'oe Yuri

Choe Yu-ri (Korean: 최유리; born 16 September 1994) is a South Korean footballer who plays as a forward for WK League club Suwon FC Women and the South Korea women's national team.

== Early life ==
Choe started playing football in elementary school, after a coach from the school's football team noticed her ability to run very fast at a school sports day. She is close friends with forward Lee Geum-min, who attended the same high school and college. Together with Jang Sel-gi, they have been called the '94 line trio', referring to their birth year and close teamwork having trained together with the national team from a young age.

== Club career ==
=== Military enlistment refusal ===
In the 2015 WK League rookie player draft, Choe was selected by Busan Sangmu, a military team requiring all players to join the military and undertake basic training. At first, Choe stated that she would join the team despite reservations about joining the military, in particular the effect that such a career move would have upon her training with the national squad. However, she eventually refused to join the military, considering it an infringement of her freedom to choose a career. According to the rules of the WK League draft at the time, any player who refused to join their drafted team was not permitted to play in the league for two years, and as such Choe was absent from the WK League in 2015. Following the incident, the KWFF revised the rules of the draft with regards to the military team, and held a special draft for Choe to give her a second chance.

=== WK League ===
Choe was signed by Daejeon Sportstoto in late 2015, having missed only one season of league football. She played for the side for five years before transferring to Incheon Hyundai Steel Red Angels ahead of the 2021 season. At the 2022 WK League Women's Football Awards, the first annual awards ceremony of its type, she was named the league's forward of the year, having scored eight goals during the 2022 season. Choe made 55 appearances for the Red Angels, scoring 20 goals and providing six assists.

=== Birmingham City ===
Choe transferred to Women's Championship side Birmingham City during the 2023 summer transfer window on a two-year deal with a year option. She scored her first goal for the club in an FA Cup tie against MK Dons in December of the same year. Choe started her second season at Birmingham with three goal involvements, recording a goal and two assists in the club's opening match against Sunderland.

=== Return to WK League ===
Following the expiration of her contract at Birmingham in 2025, Choe returned to South Korea and joined her former club Incheon Hyundai Steel Red Angels. After spending half a season with Incheon, Choe transferred to Suwon FC ahead of the 2026 season.

== International career ==
Choe made her full international debut for South Korea at the 2014 Cyprus Women's Cup before making her first appearance at a major tournament later the same year at the Asian Games. She scored her debut international goal at the tournament on her fifth appearance for South Korea, making her the record holder for the shortest time between debut and first goal for the country. Choe has since become a regular member of the national team. She was a member of the South Korean squad that finished as runners-up at the 2022 Asian Cup, scoring the first goal in the final against China.

== Style of play ==
Besides her goal-scoring ability, Choe is known for her speed and stamina. Her high-intensity play has drawn comparisons to South Korean international midfielder Hwang Hee-chan. Since her youth, she played mostly as a midfielder or winger, but started playing in a more attacking role from the 2020 season onwards.

== Career statistics ==
=== International ===
Scores and results list South Korea's goal tally first, score column indicates score after each Choe goal.

List of international goals scored by Choe Yu-ri
No.	Date	Venue	Opponent	Score	Result	Competition
1	14 September 2014	Incheon Namdong Asiad Rugby Field, Incheon, South Korea	Thailand	5–0	5–0	2014 Asian Games
2	21 September 2014	Munhak Stadium, Incheon, South Korea	Maldives	13–0	13–0	2014 Asian Games
3	11 November 2016	Hong Kong Football Club Stadium, Happy Valley, Hong Kong	Hong Kong	8–0	14–0	2017 EAFF E-1 Football Championship
4	14 November 2016	Hong Kong Football Club Stadium, Happy Valley, Hong Kong	Chinese Taipei	8–0	9–0	2017 EAFF E-1 Football Championship
5	23 September 2021	Pakhtakor Stadium, Tashkent, Uzbekistan	Uzbekistan	2–0	4–0	2022 AFC Women's Asian Cup qualification
6	6 February 2022	DY Patil Stadium, Navi Mumbai, India	China	1–0	2–3	2022 AFC Women's Asian Cup
7	9 April 2022	Goyang Stadium, Goyang, South Korea	Vietnam	1–0	3–0	Friendly
8	23 July 2022	Kashima Soccer Stadium, Kashima, Japan	China	1–0	1–1	2022 EAFF E-1 Football Championship
9	3 September 2022	Hwaseong Stadium, Hwaseong, South Korea	Jamaica	1–0	1–0	Friendly
10	5 April 2024	Icheon City Stadium, Icheon, South Korea	Philippines	1–0	3–0	Friendly
11	8 April 2024	Icheon City Stadium, Icheon, South Korea	Philippines	2–0	2–1	Friendly
12	20 February 2025	Al Hamriya Sports Club Stadium, Al Hamriyah, United Arab Emirates	Uzbekistan	3–0	3–0	2025 Pink Ladies Cup
13	23 February 2025	Al Hamriya Sports Club Stadium, Al Hamriyah, United Arab Emirates	Thailand	2–0	4–0	2025 Pink Ladies Cup
14	2 March 2026	Cbus Super Stadium, Gold Coast, Australia	Iran	1–0	3–0	2026 AFC Women's Asian Cup
15	14 September 2026	Nagai Stadium, Osaka, Japan	Myanmar	5–0	5–0	2026 Asian Games
16	17 September 2026	Nagai Stadium, Osaka, Japan	Bangladesh	3–0	6–0	2026 Asian Games
17	25 September 2026	Nagai Stadium, Osaka, Japan	Uzbekistan	2–1	6–3	2026 Asian Games
18	25 September 2026	Nagai Stadium, Osaka, Japan	Uzbekistan	4–1	6–3	2026 Asian Games
