= Football at the 2012 Summer Olympics – Women's team squads =

The women's football tournament at the 2012 Summer Olympics in London was held from 25 July to 9 August 2012. The women's tournament was a full international tournament with no restrictions on age. The twelve national teams involved in the tournament were required to register a squad of 18 players, including two goalkeepers. Additionally, teams could name a maximum of four alternate players, numbered from 19 to 22. The alternate list could contain at most three outfielders, as at least one slot was reserved for a goalkeeper. In the event of serious injury during the tournament, an injured player could be replaced by one of the players in the alternate list. Only players in these squads were eligible to take part in the tournament.

The age listed for each player is on 25 July 2012, the first day of the tournament. The numbers of caps and goals listed for each player do not include any matches played after the start of the tournament. The club listed is the club for which the player last played a competitive match prior to the tournament. A flag is included for coaches who are of a different nationality than their own national team.

== Group E ==
=== Brazil ===
Head coach: Jorge Barcellos

Brazil named a squad of 18 players and 4 alternates for the tournament. Prior to the tournament, Elaine withdrew injured and was replaced on 23 July 2012 by Danielli, who was initially selected as an alternate player. Gabi Zanotti subsequently filled the vacant alternate spot.

No.	Pos.	Player	Date of birth (age)	Caps	Goals	Club
1	GK	Andréia	14 September 1977 (aged 34)	77	0	(Brazilian Football Confederation) Juventus
2	FW	Fabiana	4 August 1989 (aged 22)	27	1	(Russian Football Union) WFC Rossiyanka
3	DF	Daiane	15 April 1983 (aged 29)	28	0	(Brazilian Football Confederation) São José
4	DF	Aline	6 July 1982 (aged 30)	50	5	(Russian Football Union) WFC Rossiyanka
5	DF	Érika	4 February 1988 (aged 24)	28	7	(Brazilian Football Confederation) Centro Olímpico
6	FW	Maurine	14 January 1986 (aged 26)	32	4	(Brazilian Football Confederation) Centro Olímpico
7	MF	Ester	9 December 1982 (aged 29)	54	1	(Russian Football Union) WFC Rossiyanka
8	MF	Formiga	3 March 1978 (aged 34)	98	11	(Brazilian Football Confederation) São José
9	FW	Thaís Guedes	20 January 1993 (aged 19)	18	3	(Brazilian Football Confederation) Vitória das Tabocas
10	FW	Marta (captain)	19 February 1986 (aged 26)	68	67	(Swedish Football Association) Tyresö
11	FW	Cristiane	15 May 1985 (aged 27)	74	57	(Russian Football Union) WFC Rossiyanka
12	MF	Rosana	7 July 1982 (aged 30)	83	14	(Brazilian Football Confederation) Centro Olímpico
13	MF	Francielle	18 October 1989 (aged 22)	36	0	(Brazilian Football Confederation) São José
14	MF	Bruna	16 October 1985 (aged 26)	0	0	(Brazilian Football Confederation) Foz Cataratas
15	MF	Danielli	21 January 1987 (aged 25)	9	0	(Brazilian Football Confederation) São José
16	DF	Renata Costa	8 July 1986 (aged 26)	74	7	(Brazilian Football Confederation) Foz Cataratas
17	DF	Grazielle	28 March 1981 (aged 31)	35	7	(Brazilian Football Confederation) Portuguesa
18	GK	Bárbara	4 July 1988 (aged 24)	23	0	(Brazilian Football Confederation) Foz Cataratas

Unenrolled alternate players
No.	Pos.	Player	Date of birth (age)	Caps	Goals	Club
19	MF	Tânia	3 October 1974 (aged 37)	80	0	(Brazilian Football Confederation) Vasco da Gama
20	FW	Gabi Zanotti	28 February 1985 (aged 27)	11	2	(Brazilian Football Confederation) Centro Olímpico
21	FW	Debinha	20 October 1991 (aged 20)	8	2	(Brazilian Football Confederation) Centro Olímpico
22	GK	Thaís Picarte	22 September 1982 (aged 29)	10	0	(Brazilian Football Confederation) Vitória das Tabocas

=== Cameroon ===
Head coach: Carl Enow

Cameroon named a squad of 18 players and 4 alternates for the tournament.

No.	Pos.	Player	Date of birth (age)	Caps	Goals	Club
1	GK	Annette Ngo Ndom	2 June 1985 (aged 27)	13	0	(Cameroonian Football Federation) Louves Minproff
2	DF	Christine Manie	4 May 1984 (aged 28)	40	6	(Romanian Football Federation) Negrea Reșița
3	FW	Ajara Nchout	12 January 1993 (aged 19)	15	2	(Russian Football Union) Energy Voronezh
4	MF	Yvonne Leuko	20 November 1991 (aged 20)	3	0	(French Football Federation) Montigny-le-Bretonneux
5	DF	Augustine Ejangue	19 January 1989 (aged 23)	22	0	(Russian Football Union) Energy Voronezh
6	MF	Francine Zouga	9 November 1987 (aged 24)	23	3	(Swiss Football Association) FSG Aïre-le-Lignon
7	FW	Gabrielle Onguéné	25 February 1989 (aged 23)	0	0	(Cameroonian Football Federation) Louves Minproff
8	MF	Raissa Feudjio	29 October 1995 (aged 16)	11	0	(Cameroonian Football Federation) Lorema
9	FW	Madeleine Ngono Mani	16 October 1983 (aged 28)	42	26	(French Football Federation) EA Guingamp
10	MF	Bébéy Beyene	10 May 1992 (aged 20)	22	1	(Cameroonian Football Federation) Louves Minproff
11	FW	Adrienne Iven	9 March 1983 (aged 29)	12	2	(Cameroonian Football Federation) Louves Minproff
12	MF	Francoise Bella (captain)	9 March 1983 (aged 29)	53	7	(Nigeria Football Federation) Rivers Angels
13	DF	Claudine Meffometou	1 July 1990 (aged 22)	8	0	(Cameroonian Football Federation) Franck Rollycek
14	DF	Bibi Medoua	9 August 1993 (aged 18)	19	0	(Cameroonian Football Federation) Locomotive de Yaoundé
15	DF	Ysis Sonkeng	20 September 1989 (aged 22)	30	0	(Cameroonian Football Federation) Louves Minproff
16	MF	Jeannette Yango	12 June 1993 (aged 19)	20	1	(Polish Football Association) Katowice
17	FW	Gaëlle Enganamouit	9 June 1992 (aged 20)	17	2	(Football Association of Serbia) Spartak Subotica
18	GK	Reine Sosso	19 March 1993 (aged 19)	11	0	(Cameroonian Football Federation) Franck Rollycek

Unenrolled alternate players
No.	Pos.	Player	Date of birth (age)	Caps	Goals	Club
19	MF	Carine Yoh	10 April 1993 (aged 19)	15	0	(Cameroonian Football Federation) Franck Rollycek
20	FW	Henriette Akaba	7 June 1992 (aged 20)	15	0	(Cameroonian Football Federation) Lorema
21	DF	Rosine Siewe Yamaleu	25 November 1991 (aged 20)	24	0	(Cameroonian Football Federation) Franck Rollycek
22	GK	Drusille Ngako	23 June 1987 (aged 25)	7	0	(Cameroonian Football Federation) Lorema

=== Great Britain ===
Head coach: Hope Powell

Great Britain named a squad of 18 players and 4 alternates for the tournament. During the tournament, Dunia Susi replaced Ifeoma Dieke on 30 July 2012 due to injury.

No.	Pos.	Player	Date of birth (age)	Caps	Goals	Club
1	GK	Karen Bardsley	14 October 1984 (aged 27)	1	0	(Swedish Football Association) Linköping
2	DF	Alex Scott	14 October 1984 (aged 27)	1	0	(The Football Association) Arsenal
3	DF	Steph Houghton	23 April 1988 (aged 24)	1	0	(The Football Association) Arsenal
4	MF	Jill Scott	2 February 1987 (aged 25)	1	0	(The Football Association) Everton
5	DF	Sophie Bradley	20 October 1989 (aged 22)	1	0	(The Football Association) Lincoln Ladies
6	DF	Casey Stoney (captain)	13 May 1982 (aged 30)	1	0	(The Football Association) Lincoln Ladies
7	FW	Karen Carney	1 August 1987 (aged 24)	1	0	(The Football Association) Birmingham City
8	MF	Fara Williams	25 January 1984 (aged 28)	1	0	(The Football Association) Everton
9	FW	Ellen White	9 May 1989 (aged 23)	1	0	(The Football Association) Arsenal
10	FW	Kelly Smith	29 October 1978 (aged 33)	1	0	(The Football Association) Arsenal
11	MF	Rachel Yankey	1 November 1979 (aged 32)	1	0	(The Football Association) Arsenal
12	FW	Kim Little	29 June 1990 (aged 22)	1	0	(The Football Association) Arsenal
13	DF	Ifeoma Dieke	25 February 1981 (aged 31)	1	0	(Swedish Football Association) Vittsjö GIK
14	MF	Anita Asante	27 April 1985 (aged 27)	1	0	(Swedish Football Association) Göteborg
15	FW	Eniola Aluko	21 February 1987 (aged 25)	1	0	(The Football Association) Birmingham City
16	DF	Claire Rafferty	11 January 1989 (aged 23)	1	0	(The Football Association) Chelsea
17	FW	Rachel Williams	10 January 1988 (aged 24)	0	0	(The Football Association) Birmingham City
18	GK	Rachel Brown	2 July 1980 (aged 32)	1	0	(The Football Association) Everton
19	DF	Dunia Susi	10 August 1987 (aged 24)	0	0	(The Football Association) Chelsea

Unenrolled alternate players
No.	Pos.	Player	Date of birth (age)	Caps	Goals	Club
20	FW	Jessica Clarke	5 May 1989 (aged 23)	0	0	(The Football Association) Lincoln Ladies
21	FW	Jane Ross	18 September 1989 (aged 22)	0	0	(Scottish Football Association) Glasgow City
22	GK	Emma Higgins	15 May 1986 (aged 26)	0	0	(Football Association of Iceland) KR

=== New Zealand ===
Head coach: (United Kingdom) Tony Readings

New Zealand named a squad of 18 players and 4 alternates for the tournament.

No.	Pos.	Player	Date of birth (age)	Caps	Goals	Club
1	GK	Jenny Bindon	25 February 1973 (aged 39)	69	0	(New Zealand Football) Hibiscus Coast
2	DF	Ria Percival	7 December 1989 (aged 22)	70	8	(German Football Association) FFC Frankfurt
3	DF	Anna Green	20 August 1990 (aged 21)	50	6	(German Football Association) Lokomotive Leipzig
4	MF	Katie Hoyle	1 February 1988 (aged 24)	62	1	(German Football Association) Bad Neuenahr
5	DF	Abby Erceg	20 November 1989 (aged 22)	72	4	(New Zealand Football) Fencibles United
6	DF	Rebecca Smith (captain)	17 June 1981 (aged 31)	68	4	(German Football Association) VfL Wolfsburg
7	DF	Ali Riley	30 October 1987 (aged 24)	61	1	(Swedish Football Association) Malmö
8	MF	Hayley Moorwood	13 February 1984 (aged 28)	80	10	(The Football Association) Chelsea
9	FW	Amber Hearn	28 November 1984 (aged 27)	59	30	(German Football Association) FF USV Jena
10	FW	Sarah Gregorius	6 August 1987 (aged 24)	28	15	(German Football Association) Bad Neuenahr
11	MF	Kirsty Yallop	4 November 1986 (aged 25)	59	11	(Swedish Football Association) Vittsjö
12	MF	Betsy Hassett	4 August 1990 (aged 21)	38	4	(United States Soccer Federation) California Golden Bears
13	FW	Rosie White	6 June 1993 (aged 19)	35	9	(United States Soccer Federation) UCLA Bruins
14	DF	Kristy Hill	1 July 1979 (aged 33)	19	0	(New Zealand Football) Eastern Suburbs
15	DF	Rebekah Stott	17 July 1993 (aged 19)	3	0	(Football Australia) Melbourne Victory
16	MF	Annalie Longo	1 July 1991 (aged 21)	42	0	(New Zealand Football) Three Kings United
17	FW	Hannah Wilkinson	28 May 1992 (aged 20)	33	12	(New Zealand Football) Glenfield Rovers
18	GK	Rebecca Rolls	22 August 1975 (aged 36)	14	0	(New Zealand Football) Fencibles United

Unenrolled alternate players
No.	Pos.	Player	Date of birth (age)	Caps	Goals	Club
19	MF	Katie Bowen	15 April 1994 (aged 18)	8	0	(New Zealand Football) Glenfield Rovers
20	FW	Sarah McLaughlin	3 June 1991 (aged 21)	11	0	(New Zealand Football) Claudelands Rovers
21	DF	Holly Patterson	16 April 1994 (aged 18)	4	0	(New Zealand Football) Claudelands Rovers
22	GK	Erin Nayler	17 April 1992 (aged 20)	0	0	(New Zealand Football) Eastern Suburbs

== Group F ==
=== Canada ===
Head coach: (United Kingdom) John Herdman

Canada named a squad of 18 players and 4 alternates for the tournament. During the tournament, Melanie Booth replaced Emily Zurrer and Marie-Ève Nault replaced Robyn Gayle on 30 July 2012 due to injury.

No.	Pos.	Player	Date of birth (age)	Caps	Goals	Club
1	GK	Karina LeBlanc	30 March 1980 (aged 32)	102	0	(United States Soccer Federation) Sky Blue
2	DF	Emily Zurrer	12 July 1987 (aged 25)	55	3	(Swedish Football Association) Dalsjöfors
3	DF	Chelsea Stewart	28 April 1990 (aged 22)	35	0	(United States Soccer Federation) UCLA Bruins
4	DF	Carmelina Moscato	2 May 1984 (aged 28)	64	2	(Swedish Football Association) Piteå IF
5	DF	Robyn Gayle	31 October 1985 (aged 26)	62	2	Unattached
6	MF	Kaylyn Kyle	6 October 1988 (aged 23)	59	4	(Canadian Soccer Association) Vancouver Whitecaps
7	DF	Rhian Wilkinson	12 May 1982 (aged 30)	125	7	Unattached
8	MF	Diana Matheson	6 April 1984 (aged 28)	135	11	Unattached
9	DF	Candace Chapman	2 April 1983 (aged 29)	112	6	(United States Soccer Federation) Sky Blue
10	DF	Lauren Sesselmann	14 August 1983 (aged 28)	20	0	Unattached
11	MF	Desiree Scott	31 July 1987 (aged 24)	47	0	(Canadian Soccer Association) Vancouver Whitecaps
12	FW	Christine Sinclair (captain)	12 June 1983 (aged 29)	184	137	Unattached
13	MF	Sophie Schmidt	28 June 1988 (aged 24)	90	7	(Swedish Football Association) Kristianstads
14	FW	Melissa Tancredi	27 December 1981 (aged 30)	82	18	(Swedish Football Association) Piteå IF
15	MF	Kelly Parker	8 March 1981 (aged 31)	37	3	(United States Soccer Federation) Atlanta Beat
16	FW	Jonelle Filigno	24 September 1990 (aged 21)	45	8	(United States Soccer Federation) Rutgers Scarlet Knights
17	MF	Brittany Timko	5 September 1985 (aged 26)	115	4	Unattached
18	GK	Erin McLeod	26 February 1983 (aged 29)	74	0	(Swedish Football Association) Dalsjöfors
19	DF	Melanie Booth	24 August 1984 (aged 27)	63	2	(Canadian Soccer Association) Vancouver Whitecaps
20	DF	Marie-Ève Nault	16 February 1982 (aged 30)	49	0	Unattached

Unenrolled alternate players
No.	Pos.	Player	Date of birth (age)	Caps	Goals	Club
21	FW	Christina Julien	6 May 1988 (aged 24)	48	10	(Swedish Football Association) Jitex BK
22	GK	Justine Bernier	20 March 1989 (aged 23)	0	0	(Canadian Soccer Association) Vancouver Whitecaps

=== Japan ===
Head coach: Norio Sasaki

Japan named a squad of 18 players and 4 alternates for the tournament.

No.	Pos.	Player	Date of birth (age)	Caps	Goals	Club
1	GK	Miho Fukumoto	2 October 1983 (aged 28)	60	0	(Japan Football Association) Okayama Yunogo Belle
2	DF	Yukari Kinga	2 May 1984 (aged 28)	79	5	(Japan Football Association) INAC Leonessa
3	DF	Azusa Iwashimizu	14 October 1986 (aged 25)	77	8	(Japan Football Association) NTV Beleza
4	DF	Saki Kumagai	17 October 1990 (aged 21)	41	0	(German Football Association) 1. FFC Frankfurt
5	DF	Aya Sameshima	16 June 1987 (aged 25)	45	2	(Japan Football Association) Vegalta Sendai
6	MF	Mizuho Sakaguchi	15 October 1987 (aged 24)	53	16	(Japan Football Association) NTV Beleza
7	FW	Kozue Ando	9 July 1982 (aged 30)	103	17	(German Football Association) FCR 2001 Duisburg
8	MF	Aya Miyama (captain)	28 January 1985 (aged 27)	112	27	(Japan Football Association) Okayama Yunogo Belle
9	MF	Nahomi Kawasumi	23 September 1985 (aged 26)	31	8	(Japan Football Association) INAC Leonessa
10	MF	Homare Sawa	6 September 1978 (aged 33)	179	80	(Japan Football Association) INAC Leonessa
11	FW	Shinobu Ohno	23 January 1984 (aged 28)	105	37	(Japan Football Association) INAC Leonessa
12	DF	Kyoko Yano	3 June 1984 (aged 28)	72	1	(Japan Football Association) Urawa Red Diamonds
13	FW	Karina Maruyama	26 March 1983 (aged 29)	70	14	(Japan Football Association) Speranza F.C. Osaka-Takatsuki
14	MF	Asuna Tanaka	23 April 1988 (aged 24)	13	3	(Japan Football Association) INAC Leonessa
15	FW	Megumi Takase	10 November 1990 (aged 21)	26	5	(Japan Football Association) INAC Leonessa
16	FW	Mana Iwabuchi	18 March 1993 (aged 19)	11	2	(Japan Football Association) NTV Beleza
17	FW	Yūki Ōgimi	15 July 1987 (aged 25)	83	36	(German Football Association) 1. FFC Turbine Potsdam
18	GK	Ayumi Kaihori	4 September 1986 (aged 25)	31	0	(Japan Football Association) INAC Leonessa

Unenrolled alternate players
No.	Pos.	Player	Date of birth (age)	Caps	Goals	Club
19	DF	Saori Ariyoshi	1 November 1987 (aged 24)	5	0	(Japan Football Association) NTV Beleza
20	MF	Megumi Kamionobe	15 March 1986 (aged 26)	18	2	(Japan Football Association) Albirex Niigata
21	FW	Ami Otaki	28 July 1989 (aged 22)	1	0	(French Football Federation) Lyon
22	GK	Erina Yamane	20 December 1990 (aged 21)	1	0	(Japan Football Association) JEF United Chiba

=== South Africa ===
Head coach: Joseph Mkhonza

South Africa named a squad of 18 players and 4 alternates for the tournament.

No.	Pos.	Player	Date of birth (age)	Caps	Goals	Club
1	GK	Roxanne Barker	6 May 1991 (aged 21)	6	0	(United States Soccer Federation) Pepperdine Waves
2	MF	Robyn Moodaly	16 June 1994 (aged 18)	12	1	(South African Football Association) High Performance Centre
3	DF	Nothando Vilakazi	28 October 1988 (aged 23)	30	6	(South African Football Association) Palace Super Falcons
4	DF	Amanda Sister	1 March 1990 (aged 22)	33	1	(South African Football Association) Liverpool Eastern Cape
5	DF	Janine van Wyk	17 April 1987 (aged 25)	76	8	(South African Football Association) Palace Super Falcons
6	DF	Zamandosi Cele	26 December 1990 (aged 21)	18	0	(South African Football Association) Durban Ladies
7	MF	Leandra Smeda	22 July 1989 (aged 23)	19	3	(South African Football Association) Cape Town Roses
8	MF	Kylie Louw	15 January 1989 (aged 23)	72	7	(United States Soccer Federation) Stephen F. Austin Ladyjacks
9	MF	Amanda Dlamini (captain)	22 July 1988 (aged 24)	49	16	(South African Football Association) University of Johannesburg
10	MF	Marry Ntsweng	19 December 1989 (aged 22)	41	1	(South African Football Association) Tshwane University
11	FW	Noko Matlou	30 September 1985 (aged 26)	74	55	(South African Football Association) University of Johannesburg
12	FW	Portia Modise	20 June 1983 (aged 29)	92	71	(South African Football Association) Palace Super Falcons
13	MF	Gabisile Hlumbane	20 December 1986 (aged 25)	33	0	(South African Football Association) University of the Free State
14	FW	Sanah Mollo	30 January 1987 (aged 25)	26	8	(South African Football Association) Bloemfontein Celtic Ladies
15	DF	Refiloe Jane	4 August 1992 (aged 19)	5	0	(South African Football Association) Mamelodi Sundowns Ladies
16	MF	Mpumi Nyandeni	19 August 1987 (aged 24)	93	7	(Russian Football Union) WFC Rossiyanka
17	FW	Andisiwe Mgcoyi	3 July 1988 (aged 24)	21	4	(South African Football Association) Mamelodi Sundowns Ladies
18	GK	Thokozile Mndaweni	8 August 1981 (aged 30)	57	1	(South African Football Association) University of Johannesburg

Unenrolled alternate players
No.	Pos.	Player	Date of birth (age)	Caps	Goals	Club
19	DF	Lebogang Mabatle	3 March 1992 (aged 20)	2	0	(South African Football Association) Hallelujah Zebra Force
20	MF	Nocawe Skiti	13 May 1989 (aged 23)	17	4	(South African Football Association) Cape Town Roses
21	FW	Jermaine Seoposenwe	12 October 1993 (aged 18)	14	2	(South African Football Association) Santos
22	GK	Andile Dlamini	2 September 1992 (aged 19)	2	0	(South African Football Association) Mamelodi Sundowns

=== Sweden ===
Head coach: Thomas Dennerby

Sweden named a squad of 18 players and 4 alternates for the tournament.

No.	Pos.	Player	Date of birth (age)	Caps	Goals	Club
1	GK	Hedvig Lindahl	29 April 1983 (aged 29)	86	0	(Swedish Football Association) Kristianstad
2	DF	Linda Sembrant	15 May 1987 (aged 25)	35	1	(Swedish Football Association) Tyresö
3	DF	Emma Berglund	19 December 1988 (aged 23)	11	0	(Swedish Football Association) Umeå
4	DF	Annica Svensson	3 March 1983 (aged 29)	28	0	(Swedish Football Association) Tyresö
5	MF	Nilla Fischer (captain)	2 August 1984 (aged 27)	90	12	(Swedish Football Association) Linköping
6	DF	Sara Thunebro	26 April 1979 (aged 33)	93	3	(German Football Association) FFC Frankfurt
7	MF	Lisa Dahlkvist	6 February 1987 (aged 25)	56	7	(Swedish Football Association) Tyresö
8	FW	Lotta Schelin	27 February 1984 (aged 28)	107	45	(French Football Federation) Lyon
9	MF	Kosovare Asllani	29 July 1989 (aged 22)	36	6	(Swedish Football Association) Kristianstad
10	MF	Sofia Jakobsson	23 April 1990 (aged 22)	17	3	(Russian Football Union) WFC Rossiyanka
11	MF	Antonia Göransson	16 September 1990 (aged 21)	24	4	(German Football Association) FFC Turbine Potsdam
12	MF	Marie Hammarström	29 March 1982 (aged 30)	23	1	(Swedish Football Association) Örebro
13	DF	Lina Nilsson	17 June 1987 (aged 25)	34	0	(Swedish Football Association) Malmö
14	MF	Johanna Almgren	22 March 1984 (aged 28)	40	0	(Swedish Football Association) Göteborg
15	MF	Caroline Seger	19 March 1985 (aged 27)	93	13	(Swedish Football Association) Tyresö
16	FW	Madelaine Edlund	15 September 1985 (aged 26)	33	1	(Swedish Football Association) Tyresö
17	DF	Malin Levenstad	13 September 1988 (aged 23)	6	0	(Swedish Football Association) Malmö
18	GK	Sofia Lundgren	20 September 1982 (aged 29)	26	0	(Swedish Football Association) Linköping

Unenrolled alternate players
No.	Pos.	Player	Date of birth (age)	Caps	Goals	Club
19	MF	Susanne Moberg	13 February 1986 (aged 26)	7	0	(Swedish Football Association) Kristianstad
20	DF	Stina Segerström	17 June 1982 (aged 30)	56	3	(Swedish Football Association) Göteborg
21	FW	Jessica Landström	12 December 1984 (aged 27)	64	19	(Swedish Football Association) Djurgårdens IF
22	GK	Kristin Hammarström	29 March 1982 (aged 30)	15	0	(Swedish Football Association) Göteborg

== Group G ==
=== Colombia ===
Head coach: Ricardo Rozo

Colombia named a squad of 18 players and 4 alternates for the tournament.

No.	Pos.	Player	Date of birth (age)	Caps	Goals	Club
1	GK	Stefany Castaño	11 January 1994 (aged 18)	0	0	(United States Soccer Federation) Graceland Yellowjackets
2	MF	Tatiana Ariza	21 February 1991 (aged 21)	12	2	(United States Soccer Federation) Austin Peay Governors
3	DF	Natalia Gaitán (captain)	3 April 1991 (aged 21)	5	0	(United States Soccer Federation) Toledo Rockets
4	DF	Natalia Ariza	21 February 1991 (aged 21)	2	0	(United States Soccer Federation) Austin Peay Governors
5	DF	Nataly Arias	2 April 1986 (aged 26)	16	3	(United States Soccer Federation) Maryland Terrapins
6	MF	Daniela Montoya	22 August 1990 (aged 21)	11	1	(Colombian Football Federation) CD Formas Íntimas
7	FW	Oriánica Velásquez	1 August 1989 (aged 22)	13	1	(United States Soccer Federation) Indiana Hoosiers
8	MF	Yoreli Rincón	27 July 1993 (aged 18)	14	8	(Colombian Football Federation) CD Gol Star
9	MF	Carmen Rodallega	15 July 1983 (aged 29)	34	6	(Colombian Football Federation) CD Carlos Sarmiento Lora
10	MF	Catalina Usme	25 December 1989 (aged 22)	20	14	(Colombian Football Federation) Independiente Medellín
11	MF	Liana Salazar	16 September 1992 (aged 19)	13	0	(United States Soccer Federation) Kansas Jayhawks
12	GK	Sandra Sepúlveda	3 March 1988 (aged 24)	16	0	(Colombian Football Federation) CD Formas Íntimas
13	DF	Yulieth Domínguez	6 September 1993 (aged 18)	17	3	(Colombian Football Federation) Estudiantes F.C.
14	DF	Kelis Peduzine	21 April 1983 (aged 29)	23	2	(Colombian Football Federation) CD Eba
15	FW	Ingrid Vidal	22 April 1991 (aged 21)	18	5	(Colombian Football Federation) CD Generaciones Palmiranas
16	FW	Lady Andrade	10 January 1992 (aged 20)	8	1	(Colombian Football Federation) CD Inter de Bogotá
17	FW	Melissa Ortiz	24 January 1990 (aged 22)	0	0	(United States Soccer Federation) Lynn Fighting Knights
18	MF	Ana María Montoya	24 September 1991 (aged 20)	0	0	(United States Soccer Federation) Arizona Wildcats

Unenrolled alternate players
No.	Pos.	Player	Date of birth (age)	Caps	Goals	Club
19	FW	Katerin Castro	21 November 1991 (aged 20)	9	3	(Colombian Football Federation) Estudiantes F.C.
20	FW	Kena Romero	31 December 1987 (aged 24)	0	0	(Colombian Football Federation) C.D. Futuras Estrellas
21	DF	Angélica Hernández	22 July 1994 (aged 18)	0	0	(Colombian Football Federation) CD Gol Star
22	GK	Catalina Pérez	8 November 1994 (aged 17)	0	0	(United States Soccer Federation) Team Boca

=== France ===
Head coach: Bruno Bini

France named a squad of 18 players and 4 alternates for the tournament.

No.	Pos.	Player	Date of birth (age)	Caps	Goals	Club
1	GK	Céline Deville	24 January 1982 (aged 30)	54	0	(French Football Federation) Lyon
2	DF	Wendie Renard	20 July 1990 (aged 22)	22	3	(French Football Federation) Lyon
3	MF	Laure Boulleau	22 October 1986 (aged 25)	27	1	(French Football Federation) Paris Saint-Germain
4	DF	Laura Georges	20 August 1984 (aged 27)	118	3	(French Football Federation) Lyon
5	DF	Ophélie Meilleroux	18 January 1984 (aged 28)	61	0	(French Football Federation) Montpellier
6	MF	Sandrine Soubeyrand (captain)	16 August 1973 (aged 38)	177	18	(French Football Federation) Juvisy
7	DF	Corine Franco	5 October 1983 (aged 28)	63	10	(French Football Federation) Lyon
8	DF	Sonia Bompastor	8 June 1980 (aged 32)	149	18	(French Football Federation) Lyon
9	FW	Eugénie Le Sommer	18 May 1989 (aged 23)	56	19	(French Football Federation) Lyon
10	MF	Camille Abily	5 December 1984 (aged 27)	97	23	(French Football Federation) Lyon
11	FW	Marie-Laure Delie	29 January 1988 (aged 24)	40	35	(French Football Federation) Montpellier
12	FW	Élodie Thomis	13 August 1986 (aged 25)	72	23	(French Football Federation) Lyon
13	MF	Camille Catala	6 May 1991 (aged 21)	7	1	(French Football Federation) Saint-Étienne
14	MF	Louisa Nécib	23 January 1987 (aged 25)	79	16	(French Football Federation) Lyon
15	MF	Élise Bussaglia	24 September 1984 (aged 27)	101	20	(French Football Federation) Paris Saint-Germain
16	DF	Sabrina Viguier	4 January 1981 (aged 31)	91	1	(French Football Federation) Lyon
17	FW	Gaëtane Thiney	28 October 1985 (aged 26)	70	32	(French Football Federation) Juvisy
18	GK	Sarah Bouhaddi	17 October 1986 (aged 25)	52	0	(French Football Federation) Lyon

Unenrolled alternate players
No.	Pos.	Player	Date of birth (age)	Caps	Goals	Club
19	DF	Kelly Gadéa	16 December 1991 (aged 20)	3	0	(French Football Federation) Montpellier
20	DF	Julie Soyer	30 June 1985 (aged 27)	1	0	(French Football Federation) Paris Saint-Germain
21	FW	Marina Makanza	1 July 1991 (aged 21)	3	0	(German Football Association) SC Freiburg
22	GK	Laëtitia Philippe	30 April 1991 (aged 21)	3	0	(French Football Federation) Montpellier

=== North Korea ===
Head coach: Sin Ui-gun

North Korea named a squad of 18 players and 4 alternates for the tournament. During the tournament, Choe Yong-sim replaced Kwon Song-hwa on 25 July and Kim Su-gyong replaced Ro Chol-ok on 31 July 2012 due to injury.

No.	Pos.	Player	Date of birth (age)	Caps	Goals	Club
1	GK	Jo Yun-mi	22 May 1989 (aged 23)	14	0	(DPR Korea Football Association) April 25
2	DF	Kim Nam-hui	4 March 1994 (aged 18)	10	0	(DPR Korea Football Association) April 25
3	DF	Kim Myong-gum	4 November 1990 (aged 21)	14	0	(DPR Korea Football Association) Rimyongsu
4	DF	Ro Chol-ok	3 January 1993 (aged 19)	6	0	(DPR Korea Football Association) April 25
5	DF	Yun Song-mi	28 January 1992 (aged 20)	20	2	(DPR Korea Football Association) Pyongyang City
6	MF	Choe Un-ju	23 January 1991 (aged 21)	14	3	(DPR Korea Football Association) Pyongyang City
7	MF	Ri Ye-gyong	26 October 1989 (aged 22)	25	9	(DPR Korea Football Association) Amrokkang
8	MF	Jon Myong-hwa	9 August 1993 (aged 18)	24	3	(DPR Korea Football Association) April 25
9	FW	Choe Mi-gyong	17 January 1991 (aged 21)	13	4	(DPR Korea Football Association) Rimyongsu
10	FW	Yun Hyon-hi	9 September 1992 (aged 19)	22	6	(DPR Korea Football Association) April 25
11	MF	Kim Chung-sim (captain)	27 November 1990 (aged 21)	15	2	(DPR Korea Football Association) April 25
12	MF	Kim Un-hyang	26 August 1993 (aged 18)	9	2	(DPR Korea Football Association) April 25
13	MF	O Hui-sun	22 November 1993 (aged 18)	9	0	(DPR Korea Football Association) Sobaeksu
14	DF	Pong Son-hwa	18 February 1993 (aged 19)	9	0	(DPR Korea Football Association) Pyongyang City
15	DF	Ri Nam-sil	13 February 1994 (aged 18)	1	0	(DPR Korea Football Association) Sobaeksu
16	FW	Kim Song-hui	23 February 1987 (aged 25)	18	5	(DPR Korea Football Association) Pyongyang City
17	FW	Kwon Song-hwa	5 February 1992 (aged 20)	6	0	(DPR Korea Football Association) April 25
18	GK	O Chang-ran	5 September 1991 (aged 20)	6	0	(DPR Korea Football Association) Mangyongbong
20	DF	Choe Yong-sim	13 October 1990 (aged 21)	17	0	(DPR Korea Football Association) Pyongyang City
21	MF	Kim Su-gyong	4 January 1995 (aged 17)	15	2	(DPR Korea Football Association) April 25

Unenrolled alternate players
No.	Pos.	Player	Date of birth (age)	Caps	Goals	Club
19	MF	Yu Jong-im	6 December 1993 (aged 18)	6	0	(DPR Korea Football Association) Amnokgang
22	GK	Kim Chol-ok	15 October 1994 (aged 17)	0	0	(DPR Korea Football Association) April 25

=== United States ===
Head coach: (Sweden) Pia Sundhage

The United States named a squad of 18 players and 4 alternates for the tournament.

No.	Pos.	Player	Date of birth (age)	Caps	Goals	Club
1	GK	Hope Solo	30 July 1981 (aged 30)	118	0	(United States Soccer Federation) Seattle Sounders
2	DF	Heather Mitts	9 June 1978 (aged 34)	126	2	Unattached
3	DF	Christie Rampone (captain)	24 June 1975 (aged 37)	260	4	Unattached
4	DF	Becky Sauerbrunn	6 June 1985 (aged 27)	24	0	(United States Soccer Federation) D.C. United
5	DF	Kelley O'Hara	4 August 1988 (aged 23)	19	0	Unattached
6	DF	Amy LePeilbet	12 March 1982 (aged 30)	70	0	Unattached
7	MF	Shannon Boxx	29 June 1977 (aged 35)	168	23	Unattached
8	FW	Amy Rodriguez	17 February 1987 (aged 25)	89	25	Unattached
9	MF	Heather O'Reilly	2 January 1985 (aged 27)	166	34	(United States Soccer Federation) Boston Breakers
10	MF	Carli Lloyd	16 July 1982 (aged 30)	135	36	Unattached
11	FW	Sydney Leroux	7 May 1990 (aged 22)	14	7	(United States Soccer Federation) Seattle Sounders
12	FW	Lauren Cheney	30 September 1987 (aged 24)	67	18	Unattached
13	FW	Alex Morgan	2 July 1989 (aged 23)	42	27	(United States Soccer Federation) Seattle Sounders
14	FW	Abby Wambach	2 June 1980 (aged 32)	182	138	Unattached
15	MF	Megan Rapinoe	5 July 1985 (aged 27)	52	12	(United States Soccer Federation) Seattle Sounders
16	DF	Rachel Buehler	26 August 1985 (aged 26)	82	3	Unattached
17	MF	Tobin Heath	29 May 1988 (aged 24)	45	6	(United States Soccer Federation) New York Fury
18	GK	Nicole Barnhart	10 October 1981 (aged 30)	43	0	Unattached

Unenrolled alternate players
No.	Pos.	Player	Date of birth (age)	Caps	Goals	Club
19	MF	Lori Lindsey	19 March 1980 (aged 32)	30	1	(United States Soccer Federation) Western New York Flash
20	DF	Meghan Klingenberg	2 August 1988 (aged 23)	2	0	(United States Soccer Federation) Western New York Flash
21	FW	Christen Press	29 December 1988 (aged 23)	0	0	(Swedish Football Association) Göteborg
22	GK	Jillian Loyden	25 June 1985 (aged 27)	2	0	Unattached
