= Football at the 2012 Summer Olympics – Women's tournament – Group G =

== Standings ==
Pos	Team	Pld	W	D	L	GF	GA	GD	Pts	Qualification
1	United States	3	3	0	0	8	2	+6	9	Qualified for the quarter-finals
2	France	3	2	0	1	8	4	+4	6	Qualified for the quarter-finals
3	North Korea	3	1	0	2	2	6	−4	3	
4	Colombia	3	0	0	3	0	6	−6	0	

Source: IOC

== United States vs France ==
25 July 2012
17:00

United States	4–2	France
Wambach 19'; Morgan 32', 66'; Lloyd 56'	Report	Thiney 12'; Delie 14'

Hampden Park, Glasgow
Attendance: 18,090
Referee: Sachiko Yamagishi (Japan)

United States	France

GK	1	Hope Solo
DF	3	Christie Rampone (c)
DF	5	Kelley O'Hara
DF	6	Amy LePeilbet
DF	16	Rachel Buehler
MF	7	Shannon Boxx	(substituted off) 17'
MF	15	Megan Rapinoe	(substituted off) 84'
MF	17	Tobin Heath
FW	12	Lauren Cheney
FW	13	Alex Morgan	(substituted off) 74'
FW	14	Abby Wambach
Substitutions:
MF	10	Carli Lloyd	(substituted on) 17'
FW	8	Amy Rodriguez	(substituted on) 74'
FW	11	Sydney Leroux	(substituted on) 84'
Manager:
(Sweden) Pia Sundhage

GK	18	Sarah Bouhaddi
DF	2	Wendie Renard
DF	5	Ophélie Meilleroux (c)	(substituted off) 46'
DF	7	Corine Franco
DF	8	Sonia Bompastor
MF	10	Camille Abily	(substituted off) 71'
MF	14	Louisa Nécib	(substituted off) 46'
MF	15	Élise Bussaglia
FW	11	Marie-Laure Delie
FW	12	Élodie Thomis
FW	17	Gaëtane Thiney
Substitutions:
DF	4	Laura Georges	(substituted on) 46'
FW	9	Eugénie Le Sommer	(substituted on) 46'
MF	6	Sandrine Soubeyrand	(substituted on) 71'
Manager:
Bruno Bini

Assistant referees:
Saori Takahashi (Japan)
Widiya Shamsuri (Malaysia)
Fourth official:
Hong Eun-Ah (South Korea)

== Colombia vs North Korea ==
25 July 2012
20:50 †

Colombia	0–2	North Korea
	Report	Kim Song-hui 39', 85'

Hampden Park, Glasgow
Attendance: 18,900
Referee: Carol Anne Chenard (Canada)

Colombia	Korea DPR

GK	18	Ana María Montoya
DF	3	Natalia Gaitán (c)
DF	4	Natalia Ariza	(substituted off) 46'
DF	13	Yulieth Domínguez
DF	14	Kelis Peduzine
MF	6	Daniela Montoya	(substituted off) 46'
MF	9	Carmen Rodallega
MF	10	Catalina Usme
MF	11	Liana Salazar	(substituted off) 77'
FW	7	Oriánica Velásquez
FW	16	Lady Andrade
Substitutions:
DF	5	Nataly Arias	(substituted on) 46'
FW	15	Ingrid Vidal	(substituted on) 46'
MF	2	Tatiana Ariza	(substituted on) 77'
Manager:
Ricardo Rozo

GK	1	Jo Yun-mi
DF	2	Kim Nam-hui
DF	3	Kim Myong-gum
DF	4	Ro Chol-ok
DF	5	Yun Song-mi
MF	6	Choe Un-ju		(substituted off) 88'
MF	7	Ri Ye-gyong
MF	8	Jon Myong-hwa
MF	11	Kim Chung-sim (c)		(substituted off) 40'
FW	10	Yun Hyon-hi	(yellow card) 83'
FW	16	Kim Song-hui		(substituted off) 90+2'
Substitutions:
MF	12	Kim Un-hyang		(substituted on) 40'
DF	20	Choe Yong-sim		(substituted on) 88'
FW	9	Choe Mi-gyong		(substituted on) 90+2'
Manager:
Sin Ui-gun

Assistant referees:
Marie Charbonneau (Canada)
Stacy Greyson (Jamaica)
Fourth official:
Therese Neguel (Cameroon)

† Game delayed by one hour due to a North Korean protest after erroneous use of the South Korean flag for North Korea.

== United States vs Colombia ==
28 July 2012
17:00

United States	3–0	Colombia
Rapinoe 33'; Wambach 74'; Lloyd 77'	Report

Hampden Park, Glasgow
Attendance: 11,313
Referee: Efthalia Mitsi (Greece)

United States	Colombia

GK	1	Hope Solo
DF	2	Heather Mitts
DF	3	Christie Rampone (c)
DF	5	Kelley O'Hara
DF	16	Rachel Buehler
MF	9	Heather O'Reilly	(substituted off) 67'
MF	10	Carli Lloyd
MF	15	Megan Rapinoe	(substituted off) 81'
FW	12	Lauren Cheney
FW	13	Alex Morgan
FW	14	Abby Wambach	(substituted off) 78'
Substitutions:
MF	17	Tobin Heath	(substituted on) 67'
FW	11	Sydney Leroux	(substituted on) 78'
FW	8	Amy Rodriguez	(substituted on) 81'
Manager:
(Sweden) Pia Sundhage

GK	18	Sandra Sepulveda
DF	3	Natalia Gaitán (c)
DF	5	Nataly Arias
DF	13	Yulieth Domínguez
DF	14	Kelis Peduzine
MF	2	Tatiana Ariza	(substituted off) 71'
MF	9	Carmen Rodallega	(substituted off) 71'
FW	10	Maria Usme
FW	7	Oriánica Velásquez
FW	15	Ingrid Vidal	(substituted off) 86'
FW	16	Lady Andrade
Substitutions:
MF	12	Daniela Montoya	(substituted on) 71'
MF	11	Liana Salazar	(substituted on) 71'
FW	17	Melissa Ortiz	(substituted on) 86'
Manager:
Ricardo Rozo

Assistant referees:
María Villa (Spain)
Yolanda Parga (Spain)
Fourth official:
Jenny Palmqvist (Sweden)

== France vs North Korea ==
28 July 2012
19:45

France	5–0	North Korea
Georges 45'; Thomis 70'; Delie 71'; Renard 81'; Catala 87'	Report

Hampden Park, Glasgow
Attendance: 11,743
Referee: Thérèse Neguel (Cameroon)

France	Korea DPR

GK	18	Sarah Bouhaddi
DF	2	Wendie Renard
DF	4	Laura Georges
DF	7	Corine Franco
DF	8	Sonia Bompastor	(yellow card) 83'
MF	6	Sandrine Soubeyrand (c)		(substituted off) 62'
MF	14	Louisa Nécib
MF	15	Élise Bussaglia
FW	9	Eugénie Le Sommer	(yellow card) 54'	(substituted off) 62'
FW	11	Marie-Laure Delie		(substituted off) 80'
FW	17	Gaëtane Thiney
Substitutions:
MF	10	Camille Abily		(substituted on) 62'
FW	12	Élodie Thomis		(substituted on) 62'
MF	13	Camille Catala		(substituted on) 80'
Manager:
Bruno Bini

GK	1	Jo Yun-mi
DF	2	Kim Nam-hui
DF	3	Kim Myong-gum (c)
DF	4	Ro Chol-ok
DF	5	Yun Song-mi
MF	6	Choe Un-ju	(substituted off) 51'
MF	7	Ri Ye-gyong
MF	8	Jon Myong-hwa	(substituted off) 72'
MF	12	Kim Un-hyang	(substituted off) 59'
FW	9	Choe Mi-gyong
FW	10	Yun Hyon-hi
Substitutions:
FW	16	Kim Song-hui	(substituted on) 51'
MF	11	Kim Chung-sim	(substituted on) 59'
MF	13	O Hui-sun	(substituted on) 72'
Manager:
Sin Ui-gun

Assistant referees:
Tempa Ndah (Benin)
Lidwine Rakotozafinoro (Madagascar)
Fourth official:
Salomé di Iorio (Argentina)

== United States vs North Korea ==
31 July 2012
17:15

United States	1–0	North Korea
Wambach 25'	Report

Old Trafford, Manchester
Attendance: 29,522
Referee: Jenny Palmqvist (Sweden)

United States	Korea DPR

GK	1	Hope Solo
DF	3	Christie Rampone (c)
DF	5	Kelley O'Hara
DF	6	Amy LePeilbet
DF	16	Rachel Buehler		(substituted off) 75'
MF	9	Heather O'Reilly
MF	10	Carli Lloyd
MF	15	Megan Rapinoe		(substituted off) 46'
FW	12	Lauren Cheney	(yellow card) 16'	(substituted off) 83'
FW	13	Alex Morgan
FW	14	Abby Wambach
Substitutions:
MF	17	Tobin Heath		(substituted on) 46'
DF	4	Becky Sauerbrunn		(substituted on) 75'
FW	8	Amy Rodriguez		(substituted on) 83'
Manager:
(Sweden) Pia Sundhage

GK	18	O Chang-ran
DF	2	Kim Nam-hui
DF	3	Kim Myong-gum
DF	14	Pong Son-hwa
DF	20	Choe Yong-sim
MF	6	Choe Un-ju
MF	7	Ri Ye-gyong	(yellow card) 13'
MF	8	Jon Myong-hwa
MF	11	Kim Chung-sim (c)		(substituted off) 80'
FW	10	Yun Hyon-hi		(substituted off) 31'
FW	16	Kim Song-hui	(yellow card) 43'	(substituted off) 63'
Substitutions:
MF	21	Kim Su-gyong		(substituted on) 31'
FW	9	Choe Mi-gyong	(yellow card) 76' (yellow-red card) 81'	(substituted on) 63'
MF	12	Kim Un-hyang		(substituted on) 80'
Manager:
Sin Ui-gun

Assistant referees:
Anna Nyström (Sweden)
Helen Karo (Sweden)
Fourth official:
Bibiana Steinhaus (Germany)

== France vs Colombia ==
31 July 2012
17:15

France	1–0	Colombia
Thomis 5'	Report

St James' Park, Newcastle
Attendance: 13,184
Referee: Quetzalli Alvarado (Mexico)

France	Colombia

GK	18	Sarah Bouhaddi
DF	2	Wendie Renard
DF	4	Laura Georges
DF	7	Corine Franco		(substituted off) 84'
DF	8	Sonia Bompastor		(substituted off) 46'
MF	6	Sandrine Soubeyrand (c)		(substituted off) 55'
MF	10	Camille Abily
MF	14	Louisa Nécib	(yellow card) 61'
FW	11	Marie-Laure Delie
FW	12	Élodie Thomis
FW	17	Gaëtane Thiney
Substitutions:
MF	3	Laure Boulleau		(substituted on) 46'
MF	15	Élise Bussaglia		(substituted on) 55'
DF	16	Sabrina Viguier		(substituted on) 84'
Manager:
Bruno Bini

GK	18	Sandra Sepulveda
DF	3	Natalia Gaitán (c)
DF	4	Natalia Ariza
DF	5	Nataly Arias
DF	13	Yulieth Domínguez	(yellow card) 49'
DF	14	Kelis Peduzine
MF	6	Daniela Montoya	(yellow card) 53'
MF	9	Carmen Rodallega
MF	10	Catalina Usme		(substituted off) 45+3'
FW	7	Oriánica Velásquez		(substituted off) 68'
FW	15	Ingrid Vidal		(substituted off) 81'
Substitutions:
MF	8	Yoreli Rincón		(substituted on) 45+3'
FW	17	Melissa Ortiz		(substituted on) 68'
MF	2	Tatiana Ariza		(substituted on) 81'
Manager:
Ricardo Rozo

Assistant referees:
Mayte Chávez (Mexico)
Shirley Perello (Honduras)
Fourth official:
Salomé di Iorio (Argentina)
