= Football at the 2010 Asian Games =

Football tournament in China

- Venue: Huadu Stadium; Ying Tung Stadium; Guangdong People's Stadium; Huangpu Sports Center; Yuexiushan Stadium; Tianhe Stadium; Guangzhou University Town Stadium
- Date: 7–25 November 2010
- Competitors: 602 from 24 nations

Football at the 2010 Asian Games was held in Guangzhou, Guangdong, China from 7 to 25 November 2010. The opening match was played 5 days prior to the opening ceremony. In this tournament, 24 teams played in the men's competition, and 7 teams participated in women's competition.

Age limit for the men teams was under-23, same as the age limit in football competitions in Olympic Games, while three overage players are allowed among each squad.

Japan became the first ever nation that won both Gold medals of Men's and Women's tournament in an Asian Games.

== Venues ==
Guangzhou
Tianhe	Panyu		Yuexiu		Huadu	Huangpu
Tianhe Stadium	University Town Main Stadium	Ying Tung Stadium	Yuexiushan Stadium	Guangdong Provincial Stadium	Huadu Stadium	Huangpu Sports Center Stadium
Capacity: 56,000	Capacity: 50,000	Capacity: 14,818	Capacity: 30,000	Capacity: 27,096	Capacity: 13,395	Capacity: 10,000
Map of Guangdong with 2010 Football of Asian Games venues marked.

== Schedule ==
P	Preliminary round	R	Round of 16	¼	Quarterfinals	½	Semifinals	F	Finals

Event↓/Date →	7th Sun	8th Mon	9th Tue	10th Wed	11th Thu	12th Fri	13th Sat	14th Sun	15th Mon	16th Tue	17th Wed	18th Thu	19th Fri	20th Sat	21st Sun	22nd Mon	23rd Tue	24th Wed	25th Thu
Men	P	P	P	P	P		P		R	R			¼				½		F
Women								P		P		P		½		F			

== Medalists ==
Event	Gold	Silver	Bronze
Men	Japan; Takuya Masuda; Yuki Saneto; Jun Sonoda; Takefumi Toma; Yusuke Higa; Shoma Kamata; Ryohei Yamazaki; Kazuya Yamamura; Masato Kurogi; Kota Mizunuma; Kensuke Nagai; Shunya Suganuma; Daisuke Suzuki; Shohei Otsuka; Keigo Higashi; Hotaru Yamaguchi; Kyohei Noborizato; Shunsuke Ando; Masato Kudo; Takamitsu Tomiyama	United Arab Emirates; Ali Khasif; Saad Surour; Abdullah Mousa; Amer Abdulrahman; Ali Al-Amri; Mohamed Al-Shehhi; Hamdan Al-Kamali; Ahmed Ali; Theyab Awana; Ahmed Khalil; Abdelaziz Sanqour; Saeed Al-Kathiri; Adel Al-Hosani; Mohamed Fawzi; Mohamed Ahmed; Abdulaziz Haikal; Ahmed Mahmoud; Mohammed Jamal; Haboush Saleh; Omar Abdulrahman	South Korea; Kim Seung-gyu; Hong Chul; Shin Kwang-hoon; Kim Ju-young; Kim Young-gwon; Hong Jeong-ho; Koo Ja-cheol; Yoon Bit-garam; Park Hee-seong; Park Chu-young; Cho Young-cheol; Kim Min-woo; Jang Suk-won; Kim Jung-woo; Oh Jae-suk; Seo Jung-jin; Yun Suk-young; Ji Dong-won; Kim Bo-kyung; Lee Bum-young
Women	Japan; Nozomi Yamago; Azusa Iwashimizu; Kyoko Yano; Yukari Kinga; Aya Sameshima; Mizuho Sakaguchi; Megumi Kamionobe; Aya Miyama; Ayako Kitamoto; Homare Sawa; Shinobu Ono; Ayumi Kaihori; Saki Kumagai; Mami Yamaguchi; Kana Osafune; Nahomi Kawasumi; Manami Nakano; Megumi Takase	North Korea; Hong Myong-hui; Kim Kyong-hwa; Choe Yong-sim; Song Jong-sun; Ro Chol-ok; Ho Un-byol; Jo Yun-mi; Ri Ye-gyong; Kim Yong-ae; Ra Un-sim; Ri Un-gyong; Kim Chung-sim; Yun Hyon-hi; Yu Jong-hui; Jon Myong-hwa; Jo Yun-mi; Jong Pok-sim; Kong Hye-ok	South Korea; Jun Min-kyung; Shim Seo-yeon; Lee Eun-mi; Kim Do-yeon; Hong Kyung-suk; Yu Ji-eun; Kwon Hah-nul; Park Eun-jung; Park Hee-young; Ji So-yun; Kim Soo-yun; Moon So-ri; Jeon Ga-eul; Kwon Eun-som; Kim Na-rae; Yoo Young-a; Cha Yun-hee; Kim Hye-ri

== Medal table ==
Rank	Nation	Gold	Silver	Bronze	Total
1	Japan (JPN)	2	0	0	2
2	North Korea (PRK)	0	1	0	1
2	United Arab Emirates (UAE)	0	1	0	1
4	South Korea (KOR)	0	0	2	2
Totals (4 entries)		2	2	2	6

== Draw ==
The draw ceremony for the team sports was held on 7 October 2010 in China. The teams were seeded based on their final ranking at the 2006 Asian Games.

=== Men ===
Group A

- China
- Malaysia
- Kyrgyzstan
- Japan

Group B

- Iran
- Vietnam
- Bahrain
- Turkmenistan

Group C

- South Korea
- Palestine
- Jordan
- North Korea

Group D

- Qatar
- Athletes from Kuwait
- India
- Singapore

Group E

- Uzbekistan
- United Arab Emirates
- Hong Kong
- Bangladesh

Group F

- ~~Iraq~~*
- Maldives
- Oman
- Thailand

* Iraq withdrew from the competition shortly after the draw and was replaced by Pakistan.

=== Women ===
Group A

- China
- South Korea
- Vietnam
- Jordan

Group B

- North Korea
- Japan
- Thailand

== Final standing ==
=== Men ===
Rank	Team	Pld	W	D	L	GF	GA	GD	Pts
1st place, gold medalist(s)	Japan	7	7	0	0	17	1	+16	21
2nd place, silver medalist(s)	United Arab Emirates	7	4	2	1	10	2	+8	14
3rd place, bronze medalist(s)	South Korea	7	5	0	2	17	6	+11	15
4	Iran	7	5	0	2	14	8	+6	15
5	North Korea	5	4	1	0	9	0	+9	13
6	Oman	5	3	1	1	9	2	+7	10
7	Thailand	5	2	2	1	8	2	+6	8
8	Uzbekistan	5	2	0	3	5	7	−2	6
9	Qatar	4	2	1	1	4	2	+2	7
10	Hong Kong	4	2	1	1	6	5	+1	7
11	Athletes from Kuwait	4	2	0	2	4	4	0	6
12	China	4	2	0	2	5	7	−2	6
13	Turkmenistan	4	1	1	2	8	8	0	4
14	India	4	1	0	3	5	10	−5	3
14	Vietnam	4	1	0	3	5	10	−5	3
16	Malaysia	4	1	0	3	3	9	−6	3
17	Maldives	3	0	2	1	0	3	−3	2
18	Bahrain	3	0	1	2	2	5	−3	1
19	Singapore	3	0	1	2	1	6	−5	1
20	Palestine	3	0	1	2	0	6	−6	1
21	Jordan	3	0	1	2	0	7	−7	1
22	Pakistan	3	0	1	2	0	8	−8	1
23	Kyrgyzstan	3	0	0	3	2	7	−5	0
24	Bangladesh	3	0	0	3	1	10	−9	0

=== Women ===
Rank	Team	Pld	W	D	L	GF	GA	GD	Pts
1st place, gold medalist(s)	Japan	4	3	1	0	6	0	+6	10
2nd place, silver medalist(s)	North Korea	4	2	1	1	5	2	+3	7
3rd place, bronze medalist(s)	South Korea	5	3	1	1	14	4	+10	10
4	China	5	2	1	2	11	4	+7	7
5	Vietnam	3	1	0	2	4	7	−3	3
6	Thailand	2	0	0	2	0	6	−6	0
7	Jordan	3	0	0	3	1	18	−17	0
