= North Korea at the 2012 Summer Olympics =

- IOC code: PRK
- NOC: Olympic Committee of the Democratic People's Republic of Korea

in London
- Competitors: 51 in 10 sports
- Flag bearers: Pak Song-chol (opening); Ri Jong-myong (closing)
- Medals Ranked 20th: Gold 4 Silver 0 Bronze 3 Total 7

Summer Olympics appearances (overview)
- 1972; 1976; 1980; 1984–1988; 1992; 1996; 2000; 2004; 2008; 2012; 2016; 2020; 2024; 2028

North Korea (officially the Democratic People's Republic of Korea) competed at the 2012 Summer Olympics in London, from 27 July to 12 August 2012. This was the nation's tenth appearance at the Olympics since its debut in 1972. North Korean athletes did not attend the 1984 Summer Olympics in Los Angeles, when they participated in the Soviet boycott, and subsequently, led a boycott at the 1988 Summer Olympics in Seoul, along with six other nations.

Olympic Committee of the Democratic People's Republic of Korea sent the nation's third largest delegation ever to the Games. A total of 51 athletes, 15 men and 36 women, competed in 10 sports. Women's football was the only team-based sport in which North Korea was represented at these Olympic games. There was only a single competitor in archery, judo, and shooting. Marathon runner Pak Song-chol became the first track and field athlete to carry the North Korean flag at the opening ceremony. For the first time since its Olympic return in 1992, North Korea did not qualify athletes in gymnastics.

North Korea left London with a total of 7 medals (4 gold and 3 bronze), beating its record from the 2008 Summer Olympics in Beijing. Along with the 1992 Summer Olympics, this was also the nation's most successful Olympics for the number of gold medals received at a single games. All of these medals were awarded to the team in judo, weightlifting, and wrestling.

== Medalists ==
Medal	Name	Sport	Event	Date
Gold	An Kum-ae	Judo	Women's 52 kg	29 July
Gold	Om Yun-chol	Weightlifting	Men's 56 kg	29 July
Gold	Kim Un-guk	Weightlifting	Men's 62 kg	30 July
Gold	Rim Jong-sim	Weightlifting	Women's 69 kg	1 August
Bronze	Ryang Chun-hwa	Weightlifting	Women's 48 kg	28 July
Bronze	Kim Myong-hyok	Weightlifting	Men's 69 kg	31 July
Bronze	Yang Kyong-il	Wrestling	Men's freestyle 55 kg	10 August

Medals by sport
Sport	1st place, gold medalist(s)	2nd place, silver medalist(s)	3rd place, bronze medalist(s)	Total
Weightlifting	3	0	2	5
Judo	1	0	0	1
Wrestling	0	0	1	1
Total	4	0	3	7

== Archery ==
Athlete	Event	Ranking round		Round of 64	Round of 32	Round of 16	Quarterfinals	Semifinals	Final	
Athlete	Event	Score	Seed	Opposition Score	Opposition Score	Opposition Score	Opposition Score	Opposition Score	Opposition Score	Rank
Kwon Un-sil	Women's individual	638	41	Valeeva (ITA) (24); L 3–7	Did not advance					

== Athletics ==
North Korean athletes have so far achieved qualifying standards in the following athletics events (up to a maximum of 3 athletes in each event at the 'A' Standard, and 1 at the 'B' Standard):

Key

- Note – Ranks given for track events are within the athlete's heat only
- Q = Qualified for the next round
- q = Qualified for the next round as a fastest loser or, in field events, by position without achieving the qualifying target
- NR = National record
- N/A = Round not applicable for the event
- Bye = Athlete not required to compete in round

Men

Athlete	Event	Final	
Athlete	Event	Result	Rank
Kim Kwang-hyok	Marathon	2:20:20	53
Pak Song-chol	Marathon	2:20:20	52

Women

Athlete	Event	Final	
Athlete	Event	Result	Rank
Jon Kyong-hui	Marathon	2:35:17	56
Kim Kum-ok	Marathon	2:33:30	49
Kim Mi-gyong	Marathon	2:38:33	74

== Boxing ==
North Korea has qualified boxers for the following events.

Men

Athlete	Event	Round of 32	Round of 16	Quarterfinals	Semifinals	Final	
Athlete	Event	Opposition Result	Opposition Result	Opposition Result	Opposition Result	Opposition Result	Rank
Pak Jong-chol	Flyweight	Henriques (BRA); L 8–12	Did not advance				

Women

Athlete	Event	Round of 16	Quarterfinals	Semifinals	Final	
Athlete	Event	Opposition Result	Opposition Result	Opposition Result	Opposition Result	Rank
Kim Hye-song	Flyweight	Savelyeva (RUS); L 9–12	Did not advance			

== Diving ==
North Korea has qualified in the following events.

Men

Athlete	Event	Preliminaries		Semifinals		Final	
Athlete	Event	Points	Rank	Points	Rank	Points	Rank
Ri Hyon-ju	10 m platform	331.30	32	Did not advance			

Women

Athlete	Event	Preliminaries		Semifinals		Final	
Athlete	Event	Points	Rank	Points	Rank	Points	Rank
Kim Jin-ok	10 m platform	320.10	15 Q	312.95	14	Did not advance	
Kim Un-hyang	10 m platform	308.10	18 Q	314.40	13	Did not advance	

== Football ==
North Korea is qualified for the women's event

- Women's team event – 1 team of 18 players

=== Women's tournament ===
Team roster

Head coach: Sin Ui-gun

North Korea named a squad of 18 players and 4 alternates for the tournament. During the tournament, Choe Yong-sim replaced Kwon Song-hwa on 25 July and Kim Su-gyong replaced Ro Chol-ok on 31 July 2012 due to injury.

No.	Pos.	Player	Date of birth (age)	Caps	Goals	Club
1	GK	Jo Yun-mi	22 May 1989 (aged 23)	14	0	(DPR Korea Football Association) April 25
2	DF	Kim Nam-hui	4 March 1994 (aged 18)	10	0	(DPR Korea Football Association) April 25
3	DF	Kim Myong-gum	4 November 1990 (aged 21)	14	0	(DPR Korea Football Association) Rimyongsu
4	DF	Ro Chol-ok	3 January 1993 (aged 19)	6	0	(DPR Korea Football Association) April 25
5	DF	Yun Song-mi	28 January 1992 (aged 20)	20	2	(DPR Korea Football Association) Pyongyang City
6	MF	Choe Un-ju	23 January 1991 (aged 21)	14	3	(DPR Korea Football Association) Pyongyang City
7	MF	Ri Ye-gyong	26 October 1989 (aged 22)	25	9	(DPR Korea Football Association) Amrokkang
8	MF	Jon Myong-hwa	9 August 1993 (aged 18)	24	3	(DPR Korea Football Association) April 25
9	FW	Choe Mi-gyong	17 January 1991 (aged 21)	13	4	(DPR Korea Football Association) Rimyongsu
10	FW	Yun Hyon-hi	9 September 1992 (aged 19)	22	6	(DPR Korea Football Association) April 25
11	MF	Kim Chung-sim (captain)	27 November 1990 (aged 21)	15	2	(DPR Korea Football Association) April 25
12	MF	Kim Un-hyang	26 August 1993 (aged 18)	9	2	(DPR Korea Football Association) April 25
13	MF	O Hui-sun	22 November 1993 (aged 18)	9	0	(DPR Korea Football Association) Sobaeksu
14	DF	Pong Son-hwa	18 February 1993 (aged 19)	9	0	(DPR Korea Football Association) Pyongyang City
15	DF	Ri Nam-sil	13 February 1994 (aged 18)	1	0	(DPR Korea Football Association) Sobaeksu
16	FW	Kim Song-hui	23 February 1987 (aged 25)	18	5	(DPR Korea Football Association) Pyongyang City
17	FW	Kwon Song-hwa	5 February 1992 (aged 20)	6	0	(DPR Korea Football Association) April 25
18	GK	O Chang-ran	5 September 1991 (aged 20)	6	0	(DPR Korea Football Association) Mangyongbong
20	DF	Choe Yong-sim	13 October 1990 (aged 21)	17	0	(DPR Korea Football Association) Pyongyang City
21	MF	Kim Su-gyong	4 January 1995 (aged 17)	15	2	(DPR Korea Football Association) April 25

Group play

Pos	Team	Pld	W	D	L	GF	GA	GD	Pts	Qualification
1	United States	3	3	0	0	8	2	+6	9	Qualified for the quarter-finals
2	France	3	2	0	1	8	4	+4	6	Qualified for the quarter-finals
3	North Korea	3	1	0	2	2	6	−4	3	
4	Colombia	3	0	0	3	0	6	−6	0	

Source: IOC
25 July 2012
20:50 †

Colombia	0–2	North Korea
	Report	Kim Song-hui 39', 85'

Hampden Park, Glasgow
Attendance: 18,900
Referee: Carol Anne Chenard (Canada)

28 July 2012
19:45

France	5–0	North Korea
Georges 45'; Thomis 70'; Delie 71'; Renard 81'; Catala 87'	Report

Hampden Park, Glasgow
Attendance: 11,743
Referee: Thérèse Neguel (Cameroon)

31 July 2012
17:15

United States	1–0	North Korea
Wambach 25'	Report

Old Trafford, Manchester
Attendance: 29,522
Referee: Jenny Palmqvist (Sweden)

† Game delayed by one hour due to North Korean protest after erroneous use of South Korean flag for North Korea.

== Judo ==
Athlete	Event	Round of 32	Round of 16	Quarterfinals	Semifinals	Repechage	Final / BM	
Athlete	Event	Opposition Result	Opposition Result	Opposition Result	Opposition Result	Opposition Result	Opposition Result	Rank
An Kum-Ae	Women's −52 kg	Cox (GBR); W 0001–0000	Nakamura (JPN); W 0102–0002	Gneto (FRA); W 0102–0013	Forciniti (ITA); W 0101–0000	Bye	Bermoy (CUB); W 0001–0000	1st place, gold medalist(s)

== Shooting ==
The following quota place has been qualified for the North Korean shooting squad at the Games;

Women

Athlete	Event	Qualification		Final	
Athlete	Event	Points	Rank	Points	Rank
Jo Yong-suk	10 m air pistol	384	10	Did not advance	
Jo Yong-suk	25 m pistol	583	7 Q	782.3	7

== Synchronized swimming ==
North Korea has qualified 2 quota places in synchronized swimming.

Athlete	Event	Technical routine		Free routine (preliminary)			Free routine (final)		
Athlete	Event	Points	Rank	Points	Total (technical + free)	Rank	Points	Total (technical + free)	Rank
Jang Hyang-mi; Jong Yon-hui	Duet	84.400	16	84.830	169.230	16	Did not advance		

== Table tennis ==
North Korea has qualified 6 quotas athlete for singles table tennis events.

Men

Athlete	Event	Preliminary round	Round 1	Round 2	Round 3	Round 4	Quarterfinals	Semifinals	Final / BM	
Athlete	Event	Opposition Result	Opposition Result	Opposition Result	Opposition Result	Opposition Result	Opposition Result	Opposition Result	Opposition Result	Rank
Kim Hyok-bong	Singles	Bye		Ghosh (IND); W 4–1	Joo S-H (KOR); W 4–2	Jiang Ty (HKG); L 3–4	Did not advance			
Kim Song-nam	Singles	Wang (USA); W 4–0	Lin J (DOM); L 3–4	Did not advance						
Jang Song-man; Kim Hyok-bong; Kim Song-nam	Team	—N/a				South Korea; L 1–3	Did not advance			

Women

Athlete	Event	Preliminary round	Round 1	Round 2	Round 3	Round 4	Quarterfinals	Semifinals	Final / BM	
Athlete	Event	Opposition Result	Opposition Result	Opposition Result	Opposition Result	Opposition Result	Opposition Result	Opposition Result	Opposition Result	Rank
Kim Jong	Singles	Bye		Molnar (CRO); W 4–1	Jiang Hj (HKG); L 2–4	Did not advance				
Ri Myong-sun	Singles	Bye		Xian Yf (FRA); L 2–4	Did not advance					
Kim Jong; Ri Mi-gyong; Ri Myong-sun	Team	—N/a				Great Britain; W 3–0	Singapore; L 0–3	Did not advance		

== Weightlifting ==
North Korea has qualified 5 men and 3 women.

Men

Athlete	Event	Snatch		Clean & Jerk		Total	Rank
Athlete	Event	Result	Rank	Result	Rank	Total	Rank
Om Yun-chol	−56 kg	125	6	168 OR	1	293	1st place, gold medalist(s)
Sin Chol-Bom	−56 kg	113	12	145	9	258	8
Kim Un-guk	−62 kg	153 OR	1	174	2	327 WR	1st place, gold medalist(s)
Kim Kum-sok	−69 kg	140	11	175	7	315	8
Kim Myong-hyok	−69 kg	145	5	184	3	329	3rd place, bronze medalist(s)

- Kim Myong-hyok originally finished fourth, but in June 2021, he was promoted to bronze due to the disqualification of Răzvan Martin.

Women

Athlete	Event	Snatch		Clean & Jerk		Total	Rank
Athlete	Event	Result	Rank	Result	Rank	Total	Rank
Ryang Chun-hwa	−48 kg	80	5	112	2	192	3rd place, bronze medalist(s)
Jong Chun-mi	−58 kg	101	4	130	4	231	4
Rim Jong-sim	−69 kg	115	1	146	1	261	1st place, gold medalist(s)

== Wrestling ==
North Korea has qualified in the following events.

Key

- VT - Victory by Fall.
- PP - Decision by Points - the loser with technical points.
- PO - Decision by Points - the loser without technical points.

Men's freestyle

Athlete	Event	Qualification	Round of 16	Quarterfinal	Semifinal	Repechage 1	Repechage 2	Final / BM	
Athlete	Event	Opposition Result	Opposition Result	Opposition Result	Opposition Result	Opposition Result	Opposition Result	Opposition Result	Rank
Yang Kyong-il	−55 kg	Bye	Mansurov (UZB); W 3–1 ^{PP}	Otarsultanov (RUS); L 1–3 ^{PP}	Did not advance	Bye	Shilimela (NAM); W 3–1 ^{PP}	Niyazbekov (KAZ); W 3–1 ^{PP}	3rd place, bronze medalist(s)
Ri Jong-myong	−60 kg	Bye	Tarash (AUS); W 3–0 ^{PO}	Madany (EGY); W 3–1 ^{PP}	Kudukhov (RUS); L 0–3 ^{PO}	Bye		Dutt (IND); L 1–3 ^{PP}	5

Men's Greco-Roman

Athlete	Event	Qualification	Round of 16	Quarterfinal	Semifinal	Repechage 1	Repechage 2	Final / BM	
Athlete	Event	Opposition Result	Opposition Result	Opposition Result	Opposition Result	Opposition Result	Opposition Result	Opposition Result	Rank
Yun Won-chol	−55 kg	Bye	Choi G-J (KOR); L 0–3 ^{PO}	Did not advance					15

Women's freestyle

Athlete	Event	Qualification	Round of 16	Quarterfinal	Semifinal	Repechage 1	Repechage 2	Final / BM	
Athlete	Event	Opposition Result	Opposition Result	Opposition Result	Opposition Result	Opposition Result	Opposition Result	Opposition Result	Rank
Han Kum-ok	−55 kg	Bye	Rentería (COL); L 1–3 ^{PP}	Did not advance					10
Choe Un-gyong	−63 kg	Bye	Jing Rx (CHN); L 1–3 ^{PP}	Did not advance		Bye	Michalik (POL); L 1–3 ^{PP}	Did not advance	12

== See also ==
- North Korea at the 2012 Summer Paralympics
