= 2007 AFC U-16 Women's Championship =

AFC U-16 Women's Championship

Tournament details
- Host country: Malaysia
- Dates: 8–17 March
- Teams: 6 (from 1 confederation)
- Venue(s): 2 (in 2 host cities)

Final positions
- Champions: North Korea (1st title)
- Runners-up: Japan
- Third place: South Korea
- Fourth place: China

The 2007 AFC U-16 Women's Championship was the second instance of the AFC U-16 Women's Championship. It was held from 8 to 17 March 2007 in Malaysia. The top three teams qualified for 2008 FIFA U-17 Women's World Cup.

== Group stage ==
=== Group A ===
Team	Pld	W	D	L	GF	GA	GD	Pts
China	2	1	1	0	3	1	+2	4
South Korea	2	1	0	1	4	4	0	3
Australia	2	0	1	1	1	3	−2	1

8 March 2007
17:30

China	3–1	South Korea
Li Wei 10'; Lou Jiahui 18'; Yang Li 37'	Report	Ji So-yun 42'

MBPJ Stadium, Petaling Jaya
Attendance: 200
Referee: Kim Kyong-hui (Korea DPR)

10 March 2007
17:00

South Korea	3–1	Australia
Park Hee-young 51'; Kim Jung-in 53'; Lee Hyun-young 58'	Report; Source	Simon 61'

MBPJ Stadium, Petaling Jaya
Attendance: 150
Referee: Praew Semaksuk (Thailand)

12 March 2007
17:00

Australia	0–0	China
	Report

MBPJ Stadium, Petaling Jaya
Attendance: 100
Referee: Kim Kyong-hui (Korea DPR)

=== Group B ===
Team	Pld	W	D	L	GF	GA	GD	Pts
North Korea	2	2	0	0	8	1	+7	6
Japan	2	1	0	1	2	2	0	3
Thailand	2	0	0	2	2	9	−7	0

8 March 2007
20:00

Japan	0–1	North Korea
	Report	Yun Hyon-hi 11'

MBPJ Stadium, Petaling Jaya
Attendance: 200
Referee: Wang Jia (China PR)

10 March 2007
19:30

North Korea	7–1	Thailand
Ho Un-byol 5', 26'; Yun Hyon-hi 8', 11', 41'; Kim Un-ju 48'; Ro Chol-ok 60'	Report	Thongsombut 3'

MBPJ Stadium, Petaling Jaya
Attendance: 150
Referee: Cha Sung-mi (Korea Republic)

12 March 2007
19:30

Thailand	1–2	Japan
Dounjantuek 44'	Report	Takano 16', 57'

MBPJ Stadium, Petaling Jaya
Attendance: 150
Referee: Wang Jia (China PR)

== Knockout stage ==
=== Semi-finals ===
14 March 2007
17:00

China	1–3	Japan
Wu Xuan 30'	Report	Fujita 37'; Iwabuchi 41'; Kira 67'

Shah Alam Stadium, Shah Alam
Attendance: 80
Referee: Cha Sung-mi (Korea Republic)

14 March 2007
20:00

North Korea	4–1	South Korea
Yun Hyon-hi 38', 81'; Ho Un-byol 63'; Ri Un-ae 70'	Report	Ryu Un-jong 28' (o.g.)

Shah Alam Stadium, Shah Alam
Attendance: 120
Referee: Praew Semaksuk (Thailand)

=== Third place match ===
17 March 2007
17:00

China	1–1 (a.e.t.)	South Korea
Ma Jun 25'	Report	Choi Eun-ji 70'
Penalties
	2–4

MBPJ Stadium, Petaling Jaya
Attendance: 150
Referee: Praew Semaksuk (Thailand)

=== Final ===
17 March 2007
20:00

Japan	0–3	North Korea
	Report	Yun Hyon-hi 8'; Jon Myong-hwa 56', 70'

MBPJ Stadium, Petaling Jaya
Attendance: 400
Referee: Cha Sung-mi (Korea Republic)

== Winners ==
2007 AFC U-16 Women's Championship

North Korea
First title

== Qualified Teams ==
Following teams qualified 2008 FIFA U-17 Women's World Cup.

- North Korea
- Japan
- South Korea

== Goalscorers ==
7 goals

- (North Korea) Yun Hyon-hi

3 goals

- (North Korea) Ho Un-byol

2 goals

- (Japan) Saki Takano
- (North Korea) Jon Myong-hwa

1 goal

- (Australia) Kyah Simon
- (China) Ma Jun
- (China) Li Wei
- (China) Lou Jiahui
- (China) Wu Xuan
- (China) Yang Li
- (Japan) Nozomi Fujita
- (Japan) Mana Iwabuchi
- (Japan) Chinatsu Kira
- (North Korea) Kim Un-ju
- (North Korea) Ri Un-ae
- (North Korea) Ro Chol-ok
- (South Korea) Choi Eun-ji
- (South Korea) Ji So-yun
- (South Korea) Kim Jung-in
- (South Korea) Lee Hyun-young
- (South Korea) Park Hee-young
- (Thailand) Nattaya Dounjantuek
- (Thailand) Rattikan Thongsombut

Own goal

- (North Korea) Ryu Un-jong (for South Korea)
