= 2015 AFC U-19 Women's Championship qualification =

Tournament details
- Host countries: Jordan (Group A); Sri Lanka (Group B); Vietnam (Group C); Thailand (Group D)
- Dates: 5–11 November 2014
- Teams: 14 (from 1 confederation)

Tournament statistics
- Matches played: 18
- Goals scored: 85 (4.72 per match)
- Attendance: 4,050 (225 per match)
- Top scorer(s): (Australia) Sunny Franco (Vietnam) Lê Hoài Lương (Uzbekistan) Nilufar Kudratova (7 goals each)

The 2015 AFC U-19 Women's Championship qualification was a women's under-19 football competition which decided the participating teams of the 2015 AFC U-19 Women's Championship. Players born between 1 January 1996 and 31 December 2000 were eligible to compete in the tournament.

A total of eight teams qualified to play in the final tournament, including South Korea, North Korea, China PR (hosts), and Japan, who qualified directly as the top four finishers of the 2013 AFC U-19 Women's Championship.

The top three teams of the final tournament qualified for the 2016 FIFA U-20 Women's World Cup in Papua New Guinea.

== Draw ==
The draw for the qualifiers was held on 17 June 2014 at the AFC House in Kuala Lumpur. A total of 14 AFC member national teams entered the qualifying stage and were drawn into four groups.

- West Zone had 7 entrants from Central Asia, South Asia and West Asia, where they were drawn into one group of four teams and one group of three teams.
- East Zone had 7 entrants from ASEAN and East Asia (excluding direct qualifiers South Korea, North Korea, China, and Japan), where they were drawn into one group of four teams and one group of three teams.

The teams were seeded according to their performance in the previous season in 2013.

| | Pot 1 | Pot 2 | Pot 3 | Pot 4 |
|---|---|---|---|---|
| West Zone (Groups A–B) | Jordan; Palestine | Iran; Uzbekistan | India; Sri Lanka | Lebanon |
| East Zone (Groups C–D) | Australia; Myanmar | Thailand; Vietnam | Chinese Taipei; Singapore | Hong Kong |

Did not enter
| West Zone | Afghanistan; Bahrain; Bangladesh; Bhutan; Iraq; Kyrgyzstan; Kuwait; Maldives; Nepal; Oman; Pakistan; Qatar; Saudi Arabia; Syria; Tajikistan; Turkmenistan; United Arab Emirates; Yemen |
| East Zone | Brunei; Cambodia; Guam; Indonesia; Laos; Macau; Malaysia; Mongolia; Northern Mariana^{1} Philippines; Timor-Leste |

Notes
^{1} Non-FIFA member, ineligible for World Cup.

== Format ==
In each group, teams played each other once at a centralised venue. The four group winners qualified for the final tournament.

=== Tiebreakers ===
The teams were ranked according to points (3 points for a win, 1 point for a draw, 0 points for a loss). If tied on points, tiebreakers would be applied in the following order:

1. Greater number of points obtained in the group matches between the teams concerned;
2. Goal difference resulting from the group matches between the teams concerned;
3. Greater number of goals scored in the group matches between the teams concerned;
4. Goal difference in all the group matches;
5. Greater number of goals scored in all the group matches;
6. Penalty shoot-out if only two teams are involved and they are both on the field of play;
7. Fewer score calculated according to the number of yellow and red cards received in the group matches (1 point for a single yellow card, 3 points for a red card as a consequence of two yellow cards, 3 points for a direct red card, 4 points for a yellow card followed by a direct red card);
8. Drawing of lots.

== Groups ==
The matches were played between 5–9 November 2014 for Groups A, C and D; 7–11 November 2014 for Group B.

=== Group A ===
- All matches were held in Jordan.
- Times listed were UTC+2.

| Pos | Team | Pld | W | D | L | GF | GA | GD | Pts | Qualification |
|---|---|---|---|---|---|---|---|---|---|---|
| 1 | Uzbekistan | 3 | 3 | 0 | 0 | 12 | 0 | +12 | 9 | 2015 AFC U-19 Women's Championship |
| 2 | Jordan (H) | 3 | 2 | 0 | 1 | 6 | 4 | +2 | 6 | |
| 3 | India | 3 | 1 | 0 | 2 | 4 | 6 | −2 | 3 | |
| 4 | Lebanon | 3 | 0 | 0 | 3 | 1 | 13 | −12 | 0 | |

Source: AFC
Rules for classification: Qualification tiebreakers
(H) Hosts
5 November 2014
12:30

| Uzbekistan | 2–0 | India |
|---|---|---|
| Kudratova 20', 35' | Report |

Petra Stadium, Amman
Attendance: 100
Referee: Rita Gani (Malaysia)
5 November 2014
16:30

| Jordan | 3–0 | Lebanon |
|---|---|---|
| Al-Khawaled 19', 51'; Al-Naber 88' | Report |

Petra Stadium, Amman
Attendance: 350
Referee: Pannipar Kamneung (Thailand)

7 November 2014
12:30

| Lebanon | 0–7 | Uzbekistan |
|---|---|---|
| | Report | Muydinova 29', 45+3', 83'; Kudratova 33', 49', 79'; Shoyimova 90+4' |

Petra Stadium, Amman
Attendance: 100
Referee: Saltanat Noroozi (Iran)
7 November 2014
16:30

| India | 1–3 | Jordan |
|---|---|---|
| Pyari Xaxa 30' | Report | Al-Khawaled 9'; Feras 56'; Al-Naber 70' |

Petra Stadium, Amman
Attendance: 300
Referee: Cong Thi Dung (Vietnam)

9 November 2014
12:30

| India | 3–1 | Lebanon |
|---|---|---|
| Dangmei Grace 33'; Pyari Xaxa 60'; Sweety Devi 87' | Report | Chehab 19' |

Petra Stadium, Amman
Attendance: 80
Referee: Rita Gani (Malaysia)
9 November 2014
16:30

| Jordan | 0–3 | Uzbekistan |
|---|---|---|
| | Report | Muydinova 49'; Kudratova 83', 90+3' |

Petra Stadium, Amman
Attendance: 300
Referee: Pannipar Kamnueng (Thailand)

=== Group B ===
- All matches were initially to be held in Palestine, but were relocated to Sri Lanka due to Iranian passport rules about banning of traveling to Palestine
- Times listed were UTC+5:30.

| Pos | Team | Pld | W | D | L | GF | GA | GD | Pts | Qualification |
|---|---|---|---|---|---|---|---|---|---|---|
| 1 | Iran | 2 | 2 | 0 | 0 | 10 | 1 | +9 | 6 | 2015 AFC U-19 Women's Championship |
| 2 | Sri Lanka (H) | 2 | 0 | 1 | 1 | 1 | 4 | −3 | 1 | |
| 3 | Palestine | 2 | 0 | 1 | 1 | 0 | 6 | −6 | 1 | |

Source: AFC
Rules for classification: Qualification tiebreakers
(H) Hosts
7 November 2014
15:30

| Sri Lanka | 0–0 | Palestine |
|---|---|---|
| | Report |

City Football Complex, Colombo
Attendance: 300
Referee: Li Juan (China)

9 November 2014
15:30

| Iran | 4–1 | Sri Lanka |
|---|---|---|
| Behesht 20', 33', 89'; Khodabakhshi 24' | Report | Aberathna 71' |

City Football Complex, Colombo
Attendance: 100
Referee: Kate Jacewicz (Australia)

11 November 2014
15:30

| Palestine | 0–6 | Iran |
|---|---|---|
| | Report | Khosravi 3', 38', 44'; Behesht 11'; Rahmati 74', 77' |

City Football Complex, Colombo
Attendance: 100
Referee: Nami Imaizumi (Japan)

=== Group C ===
- All matches were held in Vietnam.
- Times listed were UTC+7.

| Pos | Team | Pld | W | D | L | GF | GA | GD | Pts | Qualification |
|---|---|---|---|---|---|---|---|---|---|---|
| 1 | Australia | 3 | 3 | 0 | 0 | 28 | 0 | +28 | 9 | 2015 AFC U-19 Women's Championship |
| 2 | Vietnam (H) | 3 | 2 | 0 | 1 | 17 | 3 | +14 | 6 | |
| 3 | Hong Kong | 3 | 1 | 0 | 2 | 2 | 13 | −11 | 3 | |
| 4 | Singapore | 3 | 0 | 0 | 3 | 1 | 32 | −31 | 0 | |

Source: AFC
Rules for classification: Qualification tiebreakers
(H) Hosts
5 November 2014
13:00

| Australia | 6–0 | Hong Kong |
|---|---|---|
| Crummer 25'; Harrison 49'; Ibini-Isei 65'; Condon 73'; Goad 76', 84' | Report |

Vietnam Youth Football Training Centre, Hanoi
Attendance: 30
Referee: Kim Sook-hee (South Korea)
5 November 2014
15:15

| Vietnam | 11–0 | Singapore |
|---|---|---|
| Bùi Thị Trang 5'; Nguyễn Thanh Huyền 14'; Lê Hoài Lương 16', 45', 47', 62', 83'; Biện Thị Hằng 24', 77'; Đoàn Thị Thanh Tâm 42', 90+3' | Report |

Vietnam Youth Football Training Centre, Hanoi
Attendance: 100
Referee: Qin Liang (China)

7 November 2014
13:00

| Singapore | 0–19 | Australia |
|---|---|---|
| | Report | Franco 5', 11', 29', 35', 44', 59'; Chidiac 23', 70'; Baker 25', 45', 72', 80'; Goodrich 34'; Goad 50'; Binte Ros 68' (o.g.); Condon 74'; Price 83' (pen.), 86'; Harrison 90+2' |

Vietnam Youth Football Training Centre, Hanoi
Attendance: 60
Referee: Maria Piedade Rebello (India)
7 November 2014
15:15

| Hong Kong | 0–6 | Vietnam |
|---|---|---|
| | Report | Nguyễn Kim Anh 4', 50'; Bùi Thị Trang 25'; Lê Thị Thùy Trang 38'; Lê Hoài Lương 39', 73' |

Vietnam Youth Football Training Centre, Hanoi
Attendance: 30
Referee: Kuwahara Rikako (Japan)

9 November 2014
13:00

| Singapore | 1–2 | Hong Kong |
|---|---|---|
| Siti 12' | Report | Sharon Fung 58'; Lee Wing Yan 60' (pen.) |

Vietnam Youth Football Training Centre, Hanoi
Attendance: 50
Referee: Kim Sook-hee (South Korea)
9 November 2014
15:15

| Australia | 3–0 | Vietnam |
|---|---|---|
| Harrison 8' (pen.); Goad 56'; Franco 81' | Report |

Vietnam Youth Football Training Centre, Hanoi
Attendance: 150
Referee: Qin Liang (China)

=== Group D ===
- All matches were held in Thailand.
- Times listed were UTC+7.

| Pos | Team | Pld | W | D | L | GF | GA | GD | Pts | Qualification |
|---|---|---|---|---|---|---|---|---|---|---|
| 1 | Thailand | 2 | 1 | 1 | 0 | 2 | 1 | +1 | 4 | 2015 AFC U-19 Women's Championship |
| 2 | Myanmar (H) | 2 | 0 | 2 | 0 | 0 | 0 | 0 | 2 | |
| 3 | Chinese Taipei | 2 | 0 | 1 | 1 | 1 | 2 | −1 | 1 | |

Source: AFC
Rules for classification: Qualification tiebreakers
(H) Hosts
5 November 2014
17:00

| Chinese Taipei | 0–0 | Myanmar |
|---|---|---|
| | Report |

Thephasadin Stadium, Bangkok
Attendance: 200
Referee: Ri Hyang-ok (North Korea)

7 November 2014
17:00

| Thailand | 2–1 | Chinese Taipei |
|---|---|---|
| Jiraporn 12'; Jenjira 63' | Report | Pan Yen-hsin 34' |

Thephasadin Stadium, Bangkok
Attendance: 200
Referee: Casey Reibelt (Australia)

9 November 2014
17:00

| Myanmar | 0–0 | Thailand |
|---|---|---|
| | Report |

Thephasadin Stadium, Bangkok
Attendance: 1,500
Referee: Mai Hoang Trang (Vietnam)

== Qualified teams ==
The following eight teams qualified for the final tournament.

| Team | Qualified as | Qualified on | Previous appearances in tournament^{2} |
|---|---|---|---|
| South Korea | 2013 champions | 17 June 2014 | 7 (2002, **2004**, 2006, 2007, 2009, 2011, **2013**) |
| North Korea | 2013 runners-up | 17 June 2014 | 7 (2002, 2004, 2006, **2007**, 2009, 2011, 2013) |
| China | 2013 third place / Hosts | 17 June 2014 | 7 (2002, 2004, **2006**, 2007, 2009, 2011, 2013) |
| Japan | 2013 fourth place | 17 June 2014 | 7 (**2002**, 2004, 2006, 2007, **2009**, **2011**, 2013) |
| Uzbekistan | Group A winners | 9 November 2014 | 2 (2002, 2004) |
| Iran | Group B winners | 11 November 2014 | 0 (debut) |
| Australia | Group C winners | 9 November 2014 | 5 (2006, 2007, 2009, 2011, 2013) |
| Thailand | Group D winners | 9 November 2014 | 4 (2002, 2004, 2007, 2009) |

^{2} Bold indicates champion for that year. Italic indicates host for that year.

== Goalscorers ==
7 goals

- (Australia) Sunny Franco
- (Uzbekistan) Nilufar Kudratova
- (Vietnam) Lê Hoài Lương

4 goals

- (Australia) Jordan Baker
- (Australia) Beattie Goad
- (Iran) Shabnam Behesht
- (Uzbekistan) Nodira Muydinova

3 goals

- (Australia) Amy Harrison
- (Iran) Fereshteh Khosravi
- (Jordan) Rasha Al-Khawaled

2 goals

- (Australia) Alexandra Chidiac
- (Australia) Emily Condon
- (Australia) Olivia Price
- (India) Pyari Xaxa
- (Iran) Fatemeh Rahmati
- (Jordan) Jeeda Al-Naber
- (Vietnam) Biện Thị Hằng
- (Vietnam) Bùi Thị Trang
- (Vietnam) Đoàn Thị Thanh Tâm
- (Vietnam) Nguyễn Kim Anh

1 goal

- (Australia) Larissa Crummer
- (Australia) Brooke Goodrich
- (Australia) Princess Ibini-Isei
- (Chinese Taipei) Pan Yen-hsin
- (Hong Kong) Sharon Fung
- (Hong Kong) Lee Wing Yan
- (India) Dangmei Grace
- (India) Ngangbam Sweety Devi
- (Iran) Zahra Khodabakhshi
- (Jordan) Lana Feras
- (Lebanon) Mariam Chehab
- (Singapore) Sitianiwati Binte Rosielin
- (Sri Lanka) Upeksha Aberathna
- (Thailand) Jenjira Bubpha
- (Thailand) Jiraporn Mongkoldee
- (Uzbekistan) Maftuna Shoyimova
- (Vietnam) Lê Thị Thùy Trang
- (Vietnam) Nguyễn Thanh Huyền

Own goal

- (Singapore) Roseamelya Binte Ros (playing against Australia)

Source: the-AFC.com
