= Jo Yun-mi =

Jo Yun-mi may refer to:

- Jo Yun-mi (footballer, born 1987) (born 1987), North Korean midfielder
- Jo Yun-mi (footballer, born 1989) (born 1989), North Korean goalkeeper
