= 2011 AFC U-19 Women's Championship =

AFC U-19 Women's Championship

Tournament details
- Host country: Vietnam
- Dates: 6–16 October
- Teams: 6 (from 1 confederation)
- Venues: 2 (in 1 host city)

Final positions
- Champions: Japan (3rd title)
- Runners-up: North Korea
- Third place: China
- Fourth place: South Korea

Tournament statistics
- Matches played: 15
- Goals scored: 56 (3.73 per match)
- Top scorer(s): (Japan) Mai Kyokawa (North Korea) Yun Hyon-hi (5 goals)
- Best player: (Japan) Mai Kyokawa
- Fair play award: Japan

The 2011 AFC U-19 Women's Championship was the 6th edition of the AFC U-19 Women's Championship. Vietnam hosted the tournament from 6 to 16 October 2011. The top 3 teams Japan, North Korea, and China qualified to the 2012 FIFA U-20 Women's World Cup. Japan was later named host of the U-20 Women's World Cup, so their spot was awarded to fourth-place finisher South Korea.

== Seeding ==
The tournament format is:

	Teams entering in this round	Teams advancing from previous round	Competition format
First qualifying round (8 teams)	teams not in the top 8 of last tournament: Bangladesh; Hong Kong; India; Iran; Jordan; Myanmar; Philippines; Uzbekistan		2 groups of 4 teams, hosted by Philippines and Bangladesh
Second qualifying round (5 teams)	teams placed 6 to 8 in last tournament: Chinese Taipei; Thailand; Vietnam	2 group winners from 1st qualifying round	1 groups of 5 teams, hosted by Malaysia
Final tournament (6 teams)	top 5 finishers from last tournament: Australia; China; Japan; North Korea; South Korea	1 group winner from 2nd qualifying round	round-robin tournament, hosted by Vietnam

== Qualification ==
Uzbekistan and Iran progressed from the first qualifying round as winners but then finished in the last two places in the second qualification round. Vietnam came through the qualification as the group winner in the 2nd qualification round.

== Final round ==
=== Venues ===
The host city was Ho Chi Minh City in Vietnam. The Final round was played at the following stadiums.

- Thanh Long Sports Centre
- Thong Nhat Stadium

=== Results ===
All matches were held in Ho Chi Minh City, Vietnam (UTC+7)

Team	Pld	W	D	L	GF	GA	GD	Pts
Japan	5	4	1	0	13	3	+10	13
North Korea	5	4	0	1	13	3	+10	12
China	5	2	2	1	7	8	−1	8
South Korea	5	2	1	2	11	9	+2	7
Australia	5	1	0	4	7	12	−5	3
Vietnam	5	0	0	5	5	21	−16	0

6 October 2011
16:00

Vietnam	3–4	Australia
Nguyễn Thị Nguyệt 6', 49'; Phạm Hoàng Quỳnh 37'	Report	O'Neill 4'; Gielnik 60', 62', 73'

Thong Nhat Stadium, Ho Chi Minh City
Attendance: 500
Referee: Kim Sook-Hee (Korea Republic)

6 October 2011
16:00

Japan	1–1	China
Hamada 90+3'	Report	Yao Shuangyan 29'

Thanh Long Sports Centre, Ho Chi Minh City
Attendance: 300
Referee: Pannipar Kamnueng (Thailand)

6 October 2011
19:00

South Korea	1–2	North Korea
Choi Mi-rae 19'	Report	Kim Jo-ran 73'; Kim Su-gyong 81'

Thong Nhat Stadium, Ho Chi Minh City
Attendance: 200
Referee: Sachiko Yamagishi (Japan)

8 October 2011
16:00

Japan	3–1	South Korea
Kyokawa 59'; Yokoyama 61'; Shibata 79'	Report	Kim Ji-hye 85'

Thong Nhat Stadium, Ho Chi Minh City
Attendance: 500
Referee: Mai Hoàng Trang (Vietnam)

8 October 2011
16:00

North Korea	1–0	Australia
Kwon Song-hwa 23'	Report

Thanh Long Sports Centre, Ho Chi Minh City
Attendance: 200
Referee: Qin Liang (China)

8 October 2011
19:00

China	2–1	Vietnam
Nguyễn Thị Hương 43' (o.g.); Yao Shuangyan 47'	Report	Phạm Hoàng Quỳnh 35'

Thong Nhat Stadium, Ho Chi Minh City
Attendance: 300
Referee: Rita Gani (Malaysia)

10 October 2011
16:00

China	1–1	South Korea
Ni Mengjie 10'	Report	Moon Mi-ra 61'

Thanh Long Sports Centre, Ho Chi Minh City
Attendance: 300
Referee: Sachiko Yamagishi (Japan)

10 October 2011
16:00

Australia	0–1	Japan
	Report	Kyokawa 42'

Thong Nhat Stadium, Ho Chi Minh City
Attendance: 200
Referee: Ri Hyang Ok (North Korea)

10 October 2011
19:00

Vietnam	0–5	North Korea
	Report	Jon Myong-hwa 17'; Kim Un-hwa 68'; Kwon Song-hwa 71'; Yun Hyon-hi 64', 89'

Thong Nhat Stadium, Ho Chi Minh City
Attendance: 200
Referee: Pannipar Kamnueng (Thailand)

13 October 2011
16:00

North Korea	1–2	Japan
Yun Hyon-hi 74'	Report	Tanaka 30'; Kyokawa 73'

Thanh Long Sports Centre, Ho Chi Minh City
Attendance: 200
Referee: Mai Hoàng Trang (Vietnam)

13 October 2011
16:00

Australia	1–3	China
van Egmond 80'	Report	Wang Tingting 33'; Yao Shuangyan 66'; Ni Mengjie 82'

Thong Nhat Stadium, Ho Chi Minh City
Attendance: 200
Referee: Rita Gani (Malaysia)

13 October 2011
19:00

South Korea	4–1	Vietnam
Seo Hyun-sook 3'; Lee Jung-eun 45', 55'; Jang Sel-gi 88'	Report	Phan Thị Trang 63'

Thong Nhat Stadium, Ho Chi Minh City
Attendance: 350
Referee: Qin Liang (China)

16 October 2011
16:00

Australia	2–4	South Korea
Andrews 50'; Brown 82'	Report	Choi Yoo-jung 28'; Lee Geum-min 67', 83'; Seo Hyun-sook 68'

Thanh Long Sports Centre, Ho Chi Minh City
Attendance: 200
Referee: Ri Hyang Ok (North Korea)

16 October 2011
16:00

China	0–4	North Korea
	Report	Yun Hyon-hi 22', 58'; Kim Un-hwa 45'; Kim Un-ju 66'

Thong Nhat Stadium, Ho Chi Minh City
Attendance: 200
Referee: Rita Gani (Malaysia)

16 October 2011
19:00

Vietnam	0–6	Japan
	Report	Kyokawa 37', 43'; Yokoyama 46', 83', 86'; Saito 53' (pen.)

Thong Nhat Stadium, Ho Chi Minh City
Attendance: 500
Referee: Kim Sook-Hee (Korea Republic)

== Winners ==
AFC U-19 Women's Championship 2011

Japan
Third title

== Awards ==
The following awards were given.

Most Valuable Player	Top Scorer	Fair Play Award
(Japan) Mai Kyokawa	(Japan) Mai Kyokawa (5 goals) (North Korea) Yun Hyon-hi (5 goals)	Japan

== Goalscorers ==
5 goals

- (Japan) Mai Kyokawa
- (North Korea) Yun Hyon-hi

4 goals

- (Japan) Kumi Yokoyama

3 goals

- (Australia) Emily Gielnik
- (China) Yao Shuangyan

2 goals

- (China) Ni Mengjie
- (South Korea) Lee Geummin
- (South Korea) Lee Jungeun
- (South Korea) Seo Hyunsook
- (North Korea) Kwon Song-hwa
- (North Korea) Kim Un-hwa
- (Vietnam) Nguyễn Thị Nguyệt
- (Vietnam) Phạm Hoàng Quỳnh

1 goal

- (Australia) Ashley Sarine Brown
- (Australia) Emily van Egmond
- (Australia) Linda Jane O'Neill
- (Australia) Tara Jayne Andrews
- (China) Wang Tingting
- (Japan) Akane Saito
- (Japan) Haruka Hamada
- (Japan) Hanae Shibata
- (Japan) Yoko Tanaka
- (South Korea) Choi Mirae
- (South Korea) Choi Yoojung
- (South Korea) Jang Selgi
- (South Korea) Kim Ji-hye
- (South Korea) Moon Mira
- (North Korea) Jon Myong-hwa
- (North Korea) Kim Jo-ran
- (North Korea) Kim Su-gyong
- (North Korea) Kim Un-ju
- (Vietnam) Phan Thi Trang

Own goal

- (Vietnam) Nguyễn Thị Hương (playing against China PR)

== See also ==
- 2012 FIFA U-20 Women's World Cup
- 2011 AFC U-16 Women's Championship
