= Kim Un-ju (disambiguation) =

- Kim Un-ju (born 1989) is a North Korean weightlifter

Kim Un-ju may also refer to:

- Kim Un-ju (footballer, born 1992)
- Kim Un-ju (footballer, born 1993)
- Go Joon-hee (born Kim Eun-ju, 1985), South Korean actress
