= Ryoko Takara =

Japanese footballer (born 1990)

Ryoko Takara 高良 亮子
Personal information
- Full name: Ryoko Takara
- Date of birth: April 9, 1990 (age 36)
- Place of birth: Naha, Okinawa, Japan
- Height: 1.58 m (5 ft 2 in)
- Position: Midfielder

Youth career
- 2006–2008: Kamimura Gakuen High School

Senior career*
Years	Team	Apps	(Gls)
2009–2012	INAC Kobe Leonessa	41	(2)
2013–2016	Vegalta Sendai	71	(4)
2017	LSK Kvinner	15	(3)
Total		127	(9)

International career
2013–2015	Japan	3	(0)
Medal record
INAC Kobe Leonessa
Winner	Nadeshiko League	2011
Winner	Nadeshiko League	2012
Runner-up	Nadeshiko League Cup	2012
Winner	Empress's Cup	2010
Winner	Empress's Cup	2011
Winner	Empress's Cup	2012
Vegalta Sendai
Runner-up	Nadeshiko League	2015
Representing Japan
AFC U-19 Women's Championship
Gold medal – first place	2009 China
- * Club domestic league appearances and goals

Ryoko Takara (高良 亮子, Takara Ryoko; born April 9, 1990) is a former Japanese footballer who played for the Japan national team as a midfielder.

== Club career ==
Takara was born in Naha on April 9, 1990. After graduating from high school, she joined INAC Kobe Leonessa from 2009. She moved to Vegalta Sendai. In 2017, she moved to Norwegian Toppserien club LSK Kvinner. She retired end of 2017 season.

== National team career ==
On September 22, 2013, Takara debuted for Japan national team against Nigeria. She played 3 games for Japan until 2015.

== National team statistics ==
Japan national team
Year	Apps	Goals
2013	1	0
2014	0	0
2015	2	0
Total	3	0
