= Lee Wing Yan =

Hongkonger footballer

Personal information
- Full name: Lee Wing Yan
- Date of birth: 28 April 1997 (age 29)
- Place of birth: Sha Tin, Hong Kong
- Height: 1.61 m (5 ft 3 in)
- Position: Midfielder

Team information
- Current team: Happy Valley

Senior career*
Years	Team	Apps	(Gls)
- Happy Valley

International career^{‡}
2012	Hong Kong U16		(0)
2012–2014	Hong Kong U19		(0)
2016–	Hong Kong	15	(1)
- * Club domestic league appearances and goals ‡ National team caps and goals as of 15 September 2019

Lee Wing Yan (born 28 April 1997) is a Hongkonger footballer who plays as a midfielder for Hong Kong Women League club Happy Valley AA and the Hong Kong women's national team.

== International career ==
Lee Wing Yan represented Hong Kong at the 2013 AFC U-16 Women's Championship qualification, two AFC U-19 Women's Championship qualification editions (2013 and 2015), the 2017 EAFF E-1 Football Championship, the 2018 AFC Women's Asian Cup qualification, the 2018 Asian Games and the 2020 AFC Women's Olympic Qualifying Tournament.

== International goals ==
No.	Date	Venue	Opponent	Score	Result	Competition
1.	15 March 2018	IPE Chonburi Stadium, Chonburi, Thailand	Iran	1–0	1–1	2020 AFC Women's Olympic Qualifying Tournament

== See also ==
- List of Hong Kong women's international footballers
