= Yuria Obara =

Japanese footballer

Yuria Obara 小原 由梨愛
Personal information
- Full name: Yuria Obara
- Date of birth: September 4, 1990 (age 36)
- Place of birth: Towada, Aomori, Japan
- Height: 1.62 m (5 ft 4 in)
- Position: Defender

Team information
- Current team: Albirex Niigata
- Number: 14

Youth career
- 2006–2008: Tokiwagi Gakuen High School LSC

Senior career*
Years	Team	Apps	(Gls)
2009–	Albirex Niigata	146	(5)
Total		146	(5)

International career
2010	Japan U-20	3	(0)
2014	Japan	1	(0)
Medal record
Albirex Niigata
Runner-up	Empress's Cup	2011
Runner-up	Empress's Cup	2013
Runner-up	Empress's Cup	2015
Runner-up	Empress's Cup	2016
Representing Japan
AFC Women's Asian Cup
Gold medal – first place	2014 Vietnam
AFC U-19 Women's Championship
Gold medal – first place	2009 China
- * Club domestic league appearances and goals as of December 31, 2018

Yuria Obara (小原 由梨愛, Obara Yuria; born September 4, 1990) is a Japanese football player who plays for Albirex Niigata. She has previously played for the Japan national team.

== Club career ==
Obara was born in Towada on September 4, 1990. After graduating from high school, she joined Albirex Niigata in 2009.

== National team career ==
In July 2010, Obara was selected Japan U-20 national team for 2010 U-20 World Cup. In May 2014, she was selected Japan national team for 2014 Asian Cup. At this competition, on May 18, she debuted against Jordan. Japan won the championship.

== National team statistics ==
Japan national team
Year	Apps	Goals
2014	1	0
Total	1	0
