= Sunny Franco =

Australian soccer player

Personal information
- Full name: Sunny Kathleen Franco
- Date of birth: June 10, 1997 (age 29)
- Place of birth: Australia
- Position: Midfielder

Team information
- Current team: Souths United FC
- Number: 16

Senior career*
| Years | Team | Apps | (Gls) |
| 2013–2015 | Brisbane Roar | 13 | (2) |
| 2015–2016 | Sydney FC | 12 | (0) |
| 2016–2017 | Brisbane Roar | 6 | (0) |
| 2017–2018 | Western Sydney Wanderers | 2 | (0) |
| 2017–2020 | Manly United | | |
| 2020–2021 | Newcastle Jets | 12 | (2) |
| 2021 | Brisbane Roar | 1 | (0) |
| 2021–2022 | Newcastle Jets | 6 | (1) |
| 2022-2023 | NWS Spirit | 9 | (3) |
| 2023- | Souths United FC | 21 | (3) |

International career
| | Australia U-17 | 8 | (9) |
| 2014– | Australia U-19 | 3 | |
- * Club domestic league appearances and goals as of 14 June 2024

Sunny Kathleen Franco (born 10 June 1997) is an Australian women's soccer player who has played for the Newcastle Jets and the Brisbane Roar in the Australian W-League. She is currently signed with Souths United FC of the Queensland National Premier Leagues.

== Club career ==
Queensland is known to have been producing players of calibre for the Matildas, from Sue Monteath to former captain, Clare Polkinghorne. Sunny Franco has retained this legacy as Matildas captain for the U17 contingent.

Whilst the team is gearing up for the AFC U16s Girls Championships, Franco is headed for doubling as a World Cup qualifier and a major contender to represent Australia. The sixteen year player has fortified her position within the past year by producing remarkable goal scores in the Championship qualifiers last November in Manila.

Fast and quick to react, her yielding skill has been a result of her hard work training with a coach and undergoing a vigorous sprint-training. An aggressive midfielder reminding one of fellow Queenslander Tameka Butt, she is noted for her "pace, confidence on the ball, vision, technical ability, physicality and an eye for goal".

=== Brisbane Roar ===
In October 2014 she scored her first W-League goal against Melbourne. A month later she scored six goals in the AFC U-19 qualifier for Australia.

In October 2016, Franco returned to Brisbane Roar.

=== Manly United ===
Franco joined Manly United in April 2017.

=== Western Sydney Wanderers ===
Franco joined Western Sydney Wanderers ahead of the 2017–18 season.

=== Newcastle Jets ===
Franco returned to the W-League in December 2020, joining Newcastle Jets

=== Return to Brisbane Roar ===
In March 2021, following the conclusion of the 2020–21 W-League regular season, Franco joined Brisbane Roar ahead of the finals series.

=== Return to Newcastle Jets ===
Following the finals series of the 2020–21 W-League season, Franco returned Newcastle Jets, signing with them for the 2021–22 W-League season.

=== NWS Spirit ===
Franco played the 2022 season with the NWS Spirit in the NSW NPLW.

=== Souths United ===
As of 2024, Franco plays for Souths United in the Queensland NPLW competition
