= Sawako Yasumoto =

Japanese footballer (born 1990)

Sawako Yasumoto 安本 紗和子
Personal information
- Full name: Sawako Yasumoto
- Date of birth: July 6, 1990 (age 36)
- Place of birth: Shizuoka, Japan
- Height: 1.51 m (4 ft 11 1/2 in)
- Position: Forward

Team information
- Current team: Changnyeong
- Number: 11

Senior career*
Years	Team	Apps	(Gls)
????–2011	TEPCO Mareeze	0	(0)
2011	JEF United Chiba	0	(0)
2012–2020	Mynavi Vegalta Sendai	0	(6)
2021	Suwon FC	0	(0)
2022-	Changnyeong	0	(0)

International career
2010	Japan U-20	1	(0)
2010	Japan	2	(0)
Medal record
Mynavi Vegalta Sendai
Runner-up	Nadeshiko League	2015
Representing Japan
AFC U-19 Women's Championship
Gold medal – first place	2009 China
- * Club domestic league appearances and goals

Sawako Yasumoto (安本 紗和子, Yasumoto Sawako; born July 6, 1990) is a Japanese football player. She plays for Changnyeong in the WK League. She played for Japan national team.

== Club career ==
Yasumoto was born in Shizuoka Prefecture on July 6, 1990. She joined TEPCO Mareeze. However, the club was disbanded for Fukushima Daiichi nuclear disaster in 2011. In May, she moved to JEF United Chiba. In 2012, she moved to Vegalta Sendai (later Mynavi Vegalta Sendai).

== National team career ==
On May 8, 2010, when Yasumoto was 20 years old, she debuted for Japan national team against Mexico. She played 2 games Japan in 2010. She was also a member of Japan U-20 national team for 2010 U-20 World Cup in July.

== National team statistics ==
Japan national team
Year	Apps	Goals
2010	2	0
Total	2	0
