= Kwon Song-hwa =

North Korean footballer (born 1992)

Personal information
- Date of birth: 5 February 1992 (age 34)
- Place of birth: North Korea
- Position: Forward

Senior career*
Years	Team	Apps	(Gls)
2012	April 25		

International career
?	North Korea	6 (?)	(0)
- * Club domestic league appearances and goals

- Kwon Song-hwa
- Hangul: 권송화
- RR: Gwon Songhwa
- MR: Kwŏn Songhwa

Kwon Song-hwa (Korean: 권송화; born 5 February 1992) is a North Korean football forward who played for the North Korea women's national football team. She competed at the 2011 FIFA Women's World Cup, and the 2012 Summer Olympics. At the club level, she played for April 25.

== International goals ==
=== Under-19 ===
No.	Date	Venue	Opponent	Score	Result	Competition
1.	8 October 2011	Thống Nhất Stadium, Ho Chi Minh City, Vietnam	Australia	1–0	1–0	2011 AFC U-19 Women's Championship
2.	10 October 2011	Thống Nhất Stadium, Ho Chi Minh City, Vietnam	Vietnam	4–0	5–0	2011 AFC U-19 Women's Championship

== See also ==
- North Korea at the 2012 Summer Olympics
