= Seo Hyun-sook =

South Korean footballer

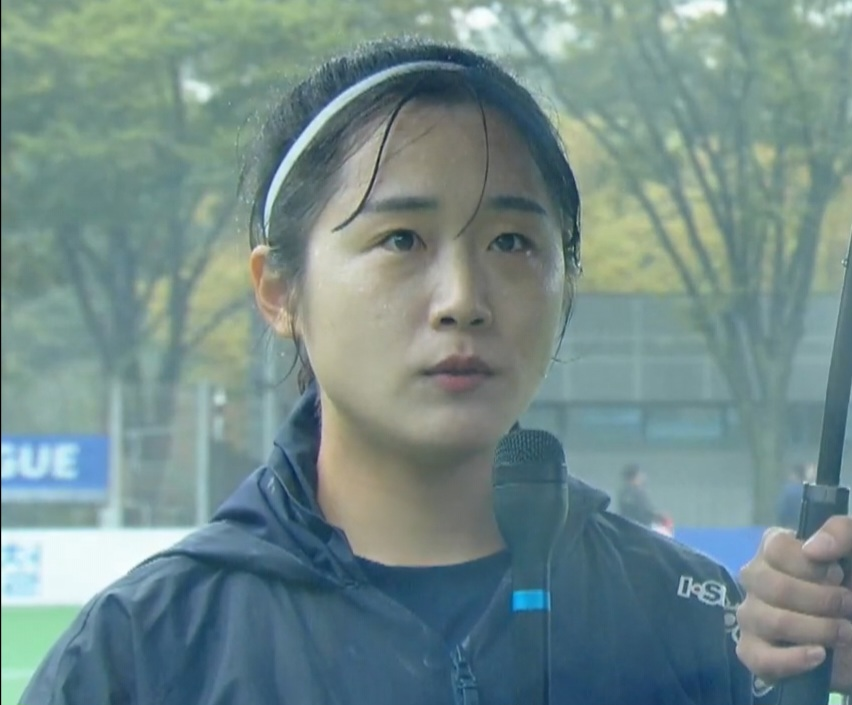

Personal information
- Full name: Seo Hyun-sook
- Date of birth: 6 January 1992 (age 34)
- Place of birth: South Korea
- Height: 1.65 m (5 ft 5 in)
- Position: Defender

Senior career*
Years	Team	Apps	(Gls)
2012–2017	Icheon Daekyo		
2018–2020	Suwon UDC		
2021–2024	Seoul City		

International career
2007–2008	South Korea U17	11	(0)
2009–2012	South Korea U20	19	(2)
2012–2017	South Korea	30	(0)
- * Club domestic league appearances and goals

Seo Hyun-sook (Korean: 서현숙; born 6 January 1992) is a South Korean former footballer who played as a defender in the WK League and for the South Korea national team.

== Early life ==
Seo is the youngest of four sisters. Her father recommended that she try playing football after seeing how fast she could run as a sixth-grade elementary schooler. Her father had wanted to become an athlete, but not having been able to realise this dream himself, he instead hoped that at least one of his daughters might pursue a career in sports. At under-18 level, Seo played for Dongsan I.C.T. Industry High School, before joining the women's football academy at Hanyang Women's University.

== Club career ==
Seo was selected by Goyang Daekyo at the 2012 WK League new players' draft. During the 2015 season she suffered from a series of minor injuries that caused her to miss much of the first half of the season, but she recovered in time to play a key role in Daekyo's second-place finish. She also took part in the 2015 Hong Myung-bo charity match at the end of the season. Seo later appeared in the 2016 WK League all-star match.

When Daekyo disbanded in 2017, Seo joined Suwon UDC. The following year she reached 100 WK League appearances. She led the team as club captain in 2019.

In 2022, while playing for Seoul City Amazones, Seo achieved the milestone of 200 WK League appearances. She retired from football in 2024.

== International career ==
Seo's international career began when she was called up to South Korea's U-16 side in 2007. She went on to play for her country at U-17 and U-20 level, and was part of the South Korean squad that won the bronze medal at the 2010 FIFA U-20 Women's World Cup. Seo made her A match debut in 2012 in a match against North Korea at a friendly tournament in China.

She went on to play at the 2014 AFC Women's Asian Cup and trained with the South Korea squad in 2015 but was left out of the squad for that year's FIFA Women's World Cup due to injury and increasing competition in her position. Seo returned to South Korea's line-up ahead of the 2015 EAFF Women's East Asian Cup, where after the side's match against North Korea, the result of which would determine the tournament winner, Seo was praised for her performance despite the end result, a 0-2 loss. The following year, she was again included in the squad as South Korea's women sought to qualify for their first Olympic Games.

After several months absence from international football, Seo was called up to play in the qualifying campaign for the 2018 AFC Women's Asian Cup.

== After football ==
In 2019, while still playing football, Seo completed her AFC C coaching license. After retiring from her playing career, the Korea Women's Football Federation awarded Seo a grant intended to help mothers working in football, at which time she expressed her intention to pursue a career in coaching after the birth of her first child.

== Personal life ==
Throughout her career, Seo received attention for her appearance and became popular with fans, regularly being referred to as a "footballing beauty" or "ulzzang footballer" in the media.

In 2019, Seo shared a photo of herself and boyfriend Kim Man-sik on her social media. During an appearance on television show Woorimal Battle later the same year she announced her forthcoming marriage to Kim. The couple were married during the football off-season in early 2020.
