= Choe Un-ju =

North Korean footballer

Personal information
- Date of birth: 23 January 1991 (age 35)
- Place of birth: Pyongyang, North Korea
- Position: Midfielder

Senior career*
| Years | Team | Apps | (Gls) |
| 2012 | Pyongyang City | | |

International career
- North Korea (under-20)
| | North Korea | 14 (?) | (3) |
- * Club domestic league appearances and goals

Choe Un-ju (Korean pronunciation: [tsʰø.ɯn.dzu]; born 23 January 1991,Korean: 최은주) is a female North Korean football midfielder.

As a junior, she was a member of the North Korea women's national under-20 football team. She won with the team the silver medal at the 2008 FIFA U-20 Women's World Cup and scored one goal during the tournament. She was part of the North Korea women's national football team at the 2012 Summer Olympics. On club level she played for Pyongyang City.

== International goals ==
=== Under-19 ===
| No. | Date | Venue | Opponent | Score | Result | Competition |
|---|---|---|---|---|---|---|
| 1. | 6 August 2009 | Hankou Cultural Sports Centre, Wuhan, China | South Korea | 3–0 | 3–0 | 2009 AFC U-19 Women's Championship |

== See also ==
- North Korea at the 2012 Summer Olympics
