= Ri Nam-sil =

North Korean footballer

Personal information
- Date of birth: 13 February 1994 (age 32)
- Place of birth: North Korea
- Position: Defender

Senior career*
| Years | Team | Apps | (Gls) |
| 2012 | Sobaeksu | | |

International career
| 2012 | North Korea | 1 (?) | (0) |
- * Club domestic league appearances and goals

Ri Nam-sil(리남실) (born 13 February 1994) is a North Korean football defender who played for the North Korea women's national football team. She competed at the 2012 Summer Olympics. At the club level, she played for Sobaeksu.

== See also ==
- North Korea at the 2012 Summer Olympics
