= Hankou Cultural Sports Centre =

Sports venue in Wuhan, China

Coordinates: 30°36′14″N 114°15′51″E

Hankou Cultural Sports Centre (Simplified Chinese: 汉口文化体育中心) is a multi-use stadium in Wuhan, China. It is currently used mostly for football matches. The stadium holds 20,000 people.

== Competitions ==
- 2009 AFC U-19 Women's Championship
- 2015 AFC U-16 Women's Championship
