= Kim Myong-gum =

North Korean footballer (born 1990)

Personal information
- Date of birth: 4 November 1990 (age 35)
- Place of birth: North Korea
- Position: Defender

Senior career*
Years	Team	Apps	(Gls)
2012	Rimyongsu		

International career
2012	North Korea	14 (?)	(0)
- * Club domestic league appearances and goals

Kim Myong-gum (born 4 November 1990) is a North Korean football defender who played for the North Korea women's national football team at the 2012 Summer Olympics. At the club level, she played for Rimyongsu.

== See also ==
- North Korea at the 2012 Summer Olympics
