= Ricardo Rozo =

Colombian football manager (born 1969)

Personal information
- Full name: Ricardo Rozo Ocampo
- Date of birth: 7 September 1969 (age 57)
- Place of birth: Bogotá, Colombia
- Position: Midfielder

Youth career
- El Salitre

Senior career*
Years	Team	Apps	(Gls)
	Millonarios	0	(0)
- Academia
- Bogotá
- Girardot

Managerial career
- 2010: Colombia Women U20
- 2010–2012: Colombia Women
- * Club domestic league appearances and goals

Ricardo Rozo Ocampo (born 7 September 1969) is a Colombian football manager and former player.

== Career ==
Rozo began his career as a footballer, playing for Millonarios, Academia, Bogotá and Girardot. He later began coaching in women's football. He was the head coach of the Colombia women's national team at the 2011 FIFA Women's World Cup and 2012 Summer Olympics.
