= Kim Un-ju (footballer, born 1992) =

North Korean footballer

Personal information
- Date of birth: 6 June 1992 (age 34)
- Place of birth: Pyongyang, North Korea
- Height: 1.72 m (5 ft 8 in)
- Position: Midfielder

International career^{‡}
Years	Team	Apps	(Gls)
2008	North Korea U-17		
2010–2012	North Korea U-20	4	(0)
2011–	North Korea	6	(0)
- ‡ National team caps and goals as of 07:57, 5 March 2016 (UTC)

- Kim Un-ju
- Hangul: 김은주
- RR: Gim Eunju
- MR: Kim Ŭnju

Kim Un-ju (Korean: 김은주; Korean pronunciation: [ki.mɯn.dzu] or [kim] [ɯn.dzu]; born 6 June 1992) is a North Korean female international football player.

== International goals ==
=== Under-19 ===
No.	Date	Venue	Opponent	Score	Result	Competition
1.	16 October 2021	Thống Nhất Stadium, Ho Chi Minh City, Vietnam	China	4–0	4–0	2011 AFC U-19 Women's Championship

=== National team ===
No.	Date	Venue	Opponent	Score	Result	Competition
1.	29 February 2016	Nagai Stadium, Osaka, Japan	South Korea	1–1	1–1	2016 AFC Women's Olympic Qualifying Tournament
