= 2009 AFC U-19 Women's Championship =

AFC U-19 Women's Championship

Tournament details
- Host country: China
- Dates: 1–12 August
- Teams: 8 (from 1 confederation)
- Venues: 2 (in 1 host city)

Final positions
- Champions: Japan (2nd title)
- Runners-up: South Korea
- Third place: North Korea
- Fourth place: China

Tournament statistics
- Matches played: 16
- Goals scored: 48 (3 per match)
- Top scorer(s): (Japan) Mana Iwabuchi (South Korea) Ji So-yun (4 goals)
- Best player: (Japan) Mana Iwabuchi
- Fair play award: North Korea

The AFC U-19 Women's Championship 2009 was the fifth edition of the AFC U-19 Women's Championship. It was held from 1 to 12 August in Wuhan, China. The top 3 teams qualified for the 2010 FIFA U-20 Women's World Cup.

== Qualification ==
=== Qualified teams ===
Direct entry

- North Korea (Defending champions)
- Japan (2007 runners-up)
- China (2007 3rd place)

Via qualification

- South Korea: Qualification Group A winners
- Vietnam: Qualification Group A runner-up
- Thailand: Qualification Group B winners
- Australia: Qualification Group B runner-up
- Chinese Taipei: Qualification Group A third-placed

== Venues ==
Wuhan
| Xinhua Road Sports Center | Hankou Cultural Sports Centre |
| Capacity: 22,140 | Capacity: 20,000 |
2009 AFC U-19 Women's Championship is located in China

== Seeding ==
1. North Korea
2. Japan
3. China
4. South Korea
5. Thailand
6. Australia
7. Vietnam
8. Chinese Taipei

== Group stage ==
The draw for the AFC U-19 Women's Championship 2009 took place in Kuala Lumpur on February 27, 2009.

- All times are China standard time (UTC+8).

=== Group A ===
| Team | Pld | W | D | L | GF | GA | GD | Pts |
|---|---|---|---|---|---|---|---|---|
| North Korea | 3 | 3 | 0 | 0 | 13 | 0 | +13 | 9 |
| South Korea | 3 | 2 | 0 | 1 | 8 | 3 | +5 | 6 |
| Vietnam | 3 | 1 | 0 | 2 | 2 | 10 | −8 | 3 |
| Thailand | 3 | 0 | 0 | 3 | 1 | 11 | −10 | 0 |

2009-08-02
18:00

| North Korea | 4–0 | Thailand |
|---|---|---|
| Ho Un-byol 7'; Kim Un-hyang 52'; Kim Chung-sim 74'; Yun Hyon-hi 90+1' | Summary |

Hankou Cultural Sports Centre, Wuhan
Attendance: 500
Referee: Jacqui Melksham (Australia)

2009-08-02
20:30

| South Korea | 3–0 | Vietnam |
|---|---|---|
| Kong Hye-won 5'; Kang In-hae 29'; Park Hee-young 46' | Summary |

Hankou Cultural Sports Centre, Wuhan
Attendance: 600
Referee: Wang Jia (China)

2009-08-04
18:00

| Thailand | 0–5 | South Korea |
|---|---|---|
| | Summary | Kang In-hae 16'; Ji So-yun 49', 65'; Park Hee-young 59'; Lim Jin-young 62' |

Hankou Cultural Sports Centre, Wuhan
Attendance: 500
Referee: Fukano Etsuko (Japan)

2009-08-04
20:30

| Vietnam | 0–6 | North Korea |
|---|---|---|
| | Summary | Yun Hyon-hi 6' (pen.), 67'; Jon Myong-hwa 17', 22', 32'; Kim Chung-sim 88' |

Hankou Cultural Sports Centre, Wuhan
Attendance: 500
Referee: Jacqui Melksham (Australia)

2009-08-06
19:30

| North Korea | 3–0 | South Korea |
|---|---|---|
| Ho Un-byol 21'; Kim Chung-sim 55'; Choe Un-ju 85' | Summary |

Hankou Cultural Sports Centre, Wuhan
Attendance: 1,100
Referee: Jacqui Melksham (Australia)

2009-08-06
19:30

| Vietnam | 2–1 | Thailand |
|---|---|---|
| Nguyễn Thị Nguyệt 10', 85' | Summary | Romyen 31' |

Xinhua Road Sports Center, Wuhan
Attendance: 100
Referee: Fukano Etsuko (Japan)

=== Group B ===
| Team | Pld | W | D | L | GF | GA | GD | Pts |
|---|---|---|---|---|---|---|---|---|
| China | 3 | 2 | 1 | 0 | 5 | 2 | +3 | 7 |
| Japan | 3 | 1 | 2 | 0 | 7 | 2 | +5 | 5 |
| Australia | 3 | 1 | 1 | 1 | 6 | 3 | +3 | 4 |
| Chinese Taipei | 3 | 0 | 0 | 3 | 0 | 11 | −11 | 0 |

2009-08-01
18:00

| Japan | 1–1 | Australia |
|---|---|---|
| Iwabuchi 66' | Summary | Simon 88' |

Hankou Cultural Sports Centre, Wuhan
Attendance: 1,500
Referee: Hong Eun-ah (Korea Republic)

2009-08-01
20:30

| China | 2–0 | Chinese Taipei |
|---|---|---|
| Gu Yasha 4'; Zhang Chenxue 82' | Summary |

Hankou Cultural Sports Centre, Wuhan
Attendance: 1,000
Referee: Semaksuk Praew (Thailand)

2009-08-03
18:00

| Chinese Taipei | 0–5 | Japan |
|---|---|---|
| | Summary | Kumagai 4'; Obara 33'; Fujita 37'; Takara 59'; Takeyama 68' |

Hankou Cultural Sports Centre, Wuhan
Attendance: 1,000
Referee: Ri Hong-sil (DPR Korea)

2009-08-03
20:30

| Australia | 1–2 | China |
|---|---|---|
| Simon 75' | Summary | Lou Jiahui 10'; An Ning 42' |

Hankou Cultural Sports Centre, Wuhan
Attendance: 3,500
Referee: Bentla D'Coth (India)

2009-08-05
19:30

| Japan | 1–1 | China |
|---|---|---|
| Iwabuchi 49' | Summary | An Ning 83' |

Hankou Cultural Sports Centre, Wuhan
Attendance: 3,000
Referee: Hong Eun-ah (Korea Republic)

2009-08-05
19:30

| Chinese Taipei | 0–4 | Australia |
|---|---|---|
| | Summary | Clifford 21'; Simon 58'; Courtney 66'; Bolger 84' |

Xinhua Road Sports Center, Wuhan
Attendance: 200
Referee: Ri Hong-sil (DPR Korea)

== Knockout stage ==
All times are China standard time (UTC+8).

=== Semi-finals ===
The winners qualified for 2010 FIFA U-20 Women's World Cup.

9 August
18:00

| North Korea | 0–1 | Japan |
|---|---|---|
| | Summary | Iwabuchi 58' |

Hankou Cultural Sports Centre, Wuhan
Attendance: 2,000
Referee: Melksham Jacqui (Australia)
9 August
21:00

| China | 0–1 | South Korea |
|---|---|---|
| | Summary | Ji So-yun 84' |

Hankou Cultural Sports Centre, Wuhan
Attendance: 6,200
Referee: Semaksuk Praew (Thailand)

=== Third place play-off ===
The winner qualified for 2010 FIFA U-20 Women's World Cup.

12 August
18:00

| North Korea | 1–0 | China |
|---|---|---|
| Ho Un-byol 66' | Summary |

Hankou Cultural Sports Centre, Wuhan
Attendance: 4,000
Referee: Hong Eun-ah (Korea Republic)

=== Final ===
12 August
21:00

| Japan | 2–1 | South Korea |
|---|---|---|
| Yasumoto 63'; Iwabuchi 87' | Summary | Ji So-yun 69' (pen.) |

Hankou Cultural Sports Centre, Wuhan
Attendance: 1,000
Referee: Wang Jia (China)

== Winners ==
AFC U-19 Women's Championship 2009

Japan
Second title

== Awards ==
| Most Valuable Player | Top Scorer | Fair Play Award |
|---|---|---|
| (Japan) Mana Iwabuchi | (Japan) Mana Iwabuchi (4 goals) (South Korea) Ji So-yun (4 goals) | North Korea |

== Goalscorers ==
There were 48 goals scored in 16 matches, for an average of 3 goals per match.

4 goals

- (Japan) Mana Iwabuchi
- (South Korea) Ji So-yun

3 goals

- (Australia) Kyah Simon
- (North Korea) Ho Un-byol
- (North Korea) Jon Myong-hwa
- (North Korea) Kim Chung-sim
- (North Korea) Yun Hyon-hi

2 goals

- (China) An Ning
- (South Korea) Kang In-hae
- (South Korea) Park Hee-young
- (Vietnam) Nguyễn Thị Nguyệt

1 goal

- (Australia) Alesha Clifford
- (Australia) Faye Courtney
- (Australia) Nicola Bolger
- (China) Gu Yasha
- (China) Lou Jiahui
- (China) Zhang Chenxue
- (Japan) Nozomi Fujita
- (Japan) Ryoko Takara
- (Japan) Saki Kumagai
- (Japan) Sawako Yasumoto
- (Japan) Yuko Takeyama
- (Japan) Yuria Obara
- (South Korea) Kong Hye-won
- (South Korea) Lim Jin-young
- (North Korea) Choe Un-ju
- (North Korea) Kim Un-hyang
- (Thailand) Nisa Romyen

== See also ==
- 2010 FIFA U-20 Women's World Cup
- AFC U-16 Women's Championship 2009
