= Kim Nam-hui =

North Korean footballer (born 1994)

Personal information
- Date of birth: 4 March 1994 (age 32)
- Place of birth: Kimchaek, North Korea
- Height: 1.63 m (5 ft 4 in)
- Position: Defender

Senior career*
Years	Team	Apps	(Gls)
2012	April 25		

International career
2012	North Korea	10 (?)	(0)
- * Club domestic league appearances and goals

- Kim Nam-hui
- Hangul: 김남희
- RR: Gim Namhui
- MR: Kim Namhŭi

Kim Nam-hui (Korean: 김남희; born 4 March 1994) is a North Korean football defender who played for the North Korea women's national football team at the 2012 Summer Olympics. At the club level, she played for April 25.

== International goals ==
No.	Date	Venue	Opponent	Score	Result	Competition
1.	17 August 2018	Palembang, Indonesia	Tajikistan	12–0	16–0	2018 Asian Games
2.	25 August 2018	Palembang, Indonesia	Japan	1–2	1–2	2018 Asian Games

== See also ==
- North Korea at the 2012 Summer Olympics
