= Ana María Montoya =

Colombian footballer (born 1991)

Personal information
- Full name: Ana María Montoya Prophater
- Date of birth: 24 September 1991 (age 35)
- Place of birth: Portland, Oregon, United States
- Height: 1.66 m (5 ft 5 1/2 in)
- Position: Midfielder

College career
Years	Team	Apps	(Gls)
2010–2013	Arizona Wildcats	78	(6)

International career^{‡}
2008	Colombia U17	3	(0)
2010	Colombia U20	5	(0)
2012	Colombia	1	(0)
- ‡ National team caps and goals as of 28 July 2012

Ana María Montoya Prophater (born 24 September 1991) is an American-born Colombian footballer who plays as a midfielder. She has been a member of the Colombia women's national team.

== College career ==
Montoya attended the University of Arizona.

== International career ==
Montoya represented Colombia at the 2008 FIFA U-17 Women's World Cup and the 2010 FIFA U-20 Women's World Cup. At senior level, she played the 2012 Summer Olympics.

== See also ==
- Colombia at the 2012 Summer Olympics
