= Tatiana Ariza =

Colombian footballer (born 1991)

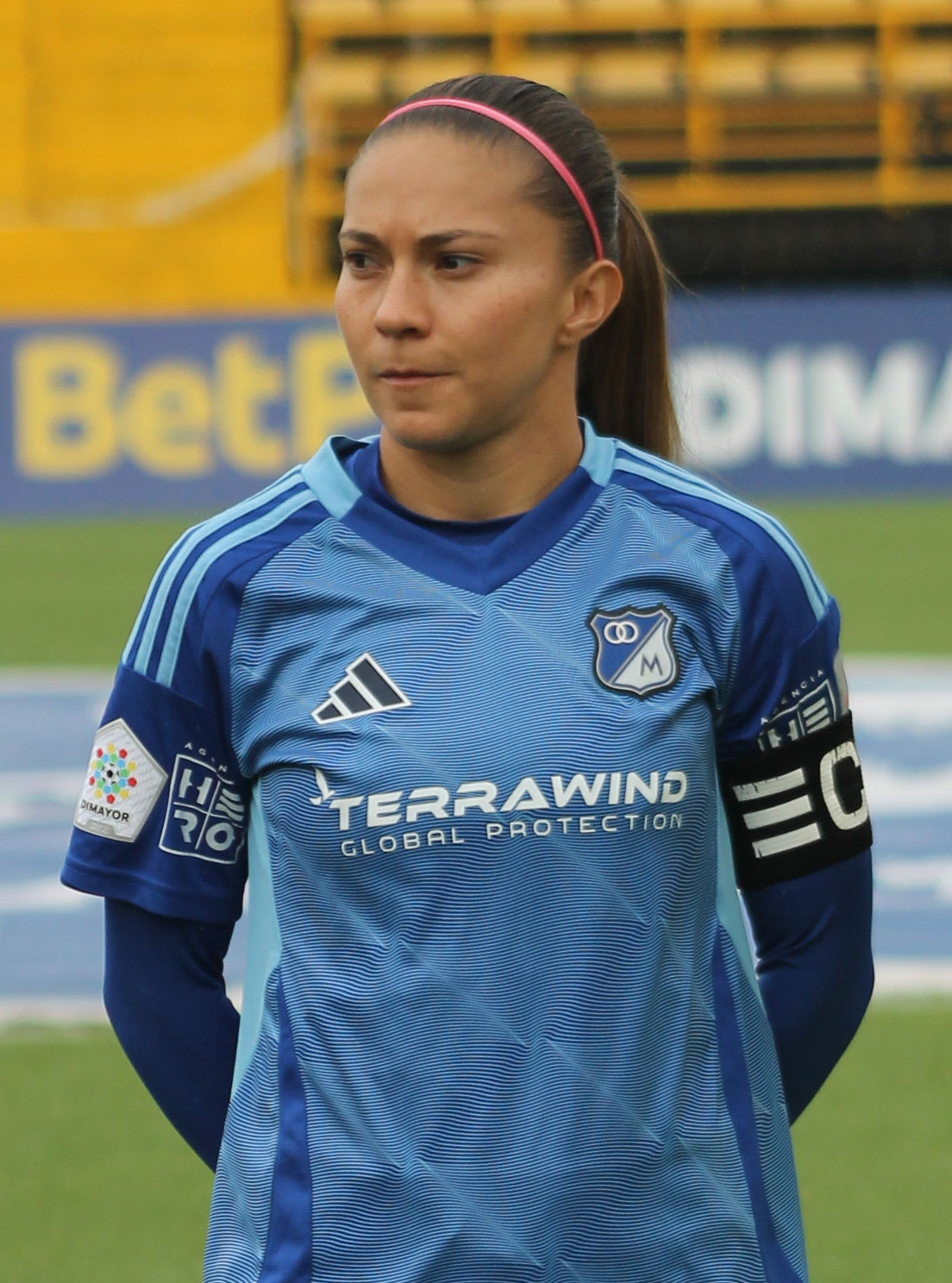
- Ariza in 2025

Personal information
- Full name: Tatiana Ariza Díaz
- Date of birth: 21 February 1991 (age 35)
- Place of birth: Bogotá, Colombia
- Height: 1.63 m (5 ft 4 in)
- Position: Midfielder

Team information
- Current team: Millonarios
- Number: 15

College career
Years	Team	Apps	(Gls)
2010–2013	Austin Peay		

Senior career*
Years	Team	Apps	(Gls)
- Gol Stars
2014–2018	Houston Aces		
2018–20??	Elpides Karditsas	0	(0)
2021	Santa Fe	11	(1)
2022–2023	Deportivo Cali	19	(6)
2024-	Millonarios		

International career^{‡}
2008	Colombia U17		
2010	Colombia U20		
2009–2025	Colombia	38	(8)
Medal record
Women's football
Representing Colombia
Copa América Femenina
Runner-up	2014 Ecuador
Runner-up	2022 Colombia
- * Club domestic league appearances and goals as of 5 June 2022 ‡ National team caps and goals as of 24 June 2015

Tatiana Ariza Díaz (born 21 February 1991) is a Colombian footballer who plays as a midfielder for Millonarios and the Colombia women's national team. She has also played for the Colombia U17 and U20 teams.

She was part of the Colombia women's national football team at the 2012 Summer Olympics. Her twin sister Natalia Ariza is also a footballer.
