= O Chang-ran =

North Korean footballer

Personal information
- Date of birth: 5 September 1991 (age 35)
- Place of birth: North Korea
- Position: Goalkeeper

Senior career*
Years	Team	Apps	(Gls)
2012	Mangyongbong		

International career
2012	North Korea	6 (?)	(0)
- * Club domestic league appearances and goals

O Chang-ran (오창란) (born 5 September 1991) is a North Korean former football goalkeeper who played for the North Korea women's national football team.

O competed at the 2012 Summer Olympics. At the club level, she played for Mangyongbong.

== See also ==
- North Korea at the 2012 Summer Olympics
