= Pong Son-hwa =

North Korean footballer

Personal information
- Date of birth: 18 February 1993 (age 33)
- Place of birth: North Korea
- Position: Defender

Senior career*
Years	Team	Apps	(Gls)
2012	Pyongyang City		

International career
2012	North Korea	9 (?)	(0)
- * Club domestic league appearances and goals

Pong Son-hwa (Korean: 봉선화, born 18 February 1993) is a North Korean football defender who played for the North Korea women's national football team at the 2012 Summer Olympics. At the club level, she played for Pyongyang City.

== See also ==
- North Korea at the 2012 Summer Olympics
