= Kelis Peduzine =

Colombian footballer (born 1983)

Personal information
- Full name: Kelis Johana Peduzine Vargas
- Date of birth: 21 April 1983 (age 43)
- Place of birth: Barranquilla, Atlántico, Colombia
- Height: 1.76 m (5 ft 9 in)
- Position: Defender

Senior career*
Years	Team	Apps	(Gls)
2012	CD Eba		

International career
2010–2012	Colombia	23(?)	(2)
- * Club domestic league appearances and goals

Kelis Johana Peduzine Vargas (born 21 April 1983) is a Colombian former footballer who played as a defender for the Colombia women's national football team. She competed at the 2011 FIFA Women's World Cup and the 2012 Summer Olympics. At the club level, she played for CD Eba.

== See also ==
- Colombia at the 2012 Summer Olympics
