= O Hui-sun =

North Korean footballer

Personal information
- Date of birth: 22 November 1993 (age 32)
- Place of birth: North Korea
- Position: Midfielder

Senior career*
Years	Team	Apps	(Gls)
2012	Sobaeksu		

International career
2012	North Korea	9 (?)	(0)
- * Club domestic league appearances and goals

- O Hui-sun
- Hangul: 오희순
- RR: O Huisun
- MR: O Hŭisun

O Hui-sun (born 22 November 1993) was a North Korean football midfielder who played for the North Korea women's national football team.

She participated at the 2012 Summer Olympics. At the club level, she played for Sobaeksu.

== See also ==
- North Korea at the 2012 Summer Olympics
