= Kim Chung-sim =

North Korean footballer (born 1990)

Personal information
- Date of birth: 27 November 1990 (age 35)
- Place of birth: North Korea
- Position: Midfielder

Senior career*
Years	Team	Apps	(Gls)
2012	April 25		

International career
2012	North Korea	15 (?)	(2)
- * Club domestic league appearances and goals

- Kim Chung-sim
- Hangul: 김충심
- RR: Gim Chungsim
- MR: Kim Ch'ungsim

Kim Chung-sim (Korean: 김충심; born 27 November 1990) is a North Korean football midfielder who plays for the North Korea women's national football team. She competed at the 2012 Summer Olympics and 2011 FIFA Women's World Cup. At the club level, she played for April 25.

== International goals ==
=== Under-19 ===
No.	Date	Venue	Opponent	Score	Result	Competition
1.	2 August 2009	Hankou Cultural Sports Centre, Wuhan, China	Thailand	3–0	4–0	2009 AFC U-19 Women's Championship
2.	4 August 2009	Hankou Cultural Sports Centre, Wuhan, China	Vietnam	6–0	6–0	2009 AFC U-19 Women's Championship
3.	6 August 2009	Hankou Cultural Sports Centre, Wuhan, China	South Korea	2–0	3–0	2009 AFC U-19 Women's Championship

== See also ==
- North Korea at the 2012 Summer Olympics
