= Natalia Ariza =

Colombian footballer (born 1991)

Personal information
- Full name: Natalia Ariza Díaz
- Date of birth: 21 February 1991 (age 35)
- Place of birth: Bogotá, Colombia
- Height: 1.62 m (5 ft 4 in)
- Position: Defender

Team information
- Current team: Houston Aces
- Number: 11

College career
Years	Team	Apps	(Gls)
2010–2013	Austin Peay		

Senior career*
Years	Team	Apps	(Gls)
2014–	Houston Aces		

International career
2008	Colombia U17		
2012	Colombia	2 (?)	(0)
- * Club domestic league appearances and goals

Natalia Ariza Díaz (born 21 February 1991) is a Colombian footballer who plays as a defender for Houston Aces.

She was part of the Colombia women's national football team at the 2012 Summer Olympics. She has also played for the Colombia U17 team. At club level, she played for Austin Peay State University.

Her twin sister, Tatiana Ariza, is also a footballer who plays as a defender.

== See also ==
- Colombia at the 2012 Summer Olympics
