= Yun Hyon-hi =

North Korean footballer (born 1992)

Personal information
- Date of birth: 9 September 1992 (age 34)
- Place of birth: North Korea
- Position: Forward

Senior career*
Years	Team	Apps	(Gls)
2012	April 25		

International career
2012	North Korea	22 (?)	(6)
- * Club domestic league appearances and goals

- Yun Hyon-hi
- Hangul: 윤현히
- RR: Yun Hyeonhi
- MR: Yun Hyŏnhi

Yun Hyon-hi (Korean: 윤현히; born 9 September 1992) is a North Korean football forward who played for the North Korea women's national football team at the 2012 Summer Olympics. At the club level, she played for April 25.

== International goals ==
=== Under-16 ===
No.	Date	Venue	Opponent	Score	Result	Competition
1.	8 March 2007	Petaling Jaya, Malaysia	Japan	1–0	1–0	2007 AFC U-16 Women's Championship
2.	10 March 2007	Petaling Jaya, Malaysia	Thailand	2–1	7–1	2007 AFC U-16 Women's Championship
3.	10 March 2007	Petaling Jaya, Malaysia	Thailand	3–1	7–1	2007 AFC U-16 Women's Championship
4.	10 March 2007	Petaling Jaya, Malaysia	Thailand	5–1	7–1	2007 AFC U-16 Women's Championship
5.	14 March 2007	Shah Alam, Malaysia	South Korea	1–1	4–1	2007 AFC U-16 Women's Championship
6.	14 March 2007	Shah Alam, Malaysia	South Korea	4–1	4–1	2007 AFC U-16 Women's Championship
7.	17 March 2007	Petaling Jaya, Malaysia	Japan	1–0	3–0	2007 AFC U-16 Women's Championship
8.	1 November 2008	Christchurch, New Zealand	Costa Rica	1–0	2–1	2008 FIFA U-17 Women's World Cup
9.	1 November 2008	Christchurch, New Zealand	Costa Rica	2–1	2–1	2008 FIFA U-17 Women's World Cup

=== Under-19 ===
No.	Date	Venue	Opponent	Score	Result	Competition
1.	2 August 2009	Wuhan, China	Thailand	4–0	4–0	2009 AFC U-19 Women's Championship
2.	4 August 2009	Wuhan, China	Vietnam	1–0	6–0	2009 AFC U-19 Women's Championship
3.	4 August 2009	Wuhan, China	Vietnam	5–0	6–0	2009 AFC U-19 Women's Championship
4.	16 July 2010	Bielefeld, Germany	New Zealand	1–0	2–1	2010 FIFA U-20 Women's World Cup
5.	10 October 2011	Hồ Chí Minh City, Vietnam	Vietnam	2–0	5–0	2011 AFC U-19 Women's Championship
6.	10 October 2011	Hồ Chí Minh City, Vietnam	Vietnam	5–0	5–0	2011 AFC U-19 Women's Championship
7.	13 October 2011	Hồ Chí Minh City, Vietnam	Japan	1–2	1–2	2011 AFC U-19 Women's Championship
8.	16 October 2011	Hồ Chí Minh City, Vietnam	China	1–0	4–0	2011 AFC U-19 Women's Championship
9.	16 October 2011	Hồ Chí Minh City, Vietnam	China	3–0	4–0	2011 AFC U-19 Women's Championship
10.	20 August 2012	Kobe, Japan	Norway	1–0	4–2	2012 FIFA U-20 Women's World Cup
11.	20 August 2012	Kobe, Japan	Norway	2–1	4–2	2012 FIFA U-20 Women's World Cup
12.	23 August 2012	Kobe, Japan	Argentina	1–0	9–0	2012 FIFA U-20 Women's World Cup
13.	27 August 2012	Saitama, Japan	Canada	2–1	2–1	2012 FIFA U-20 Women's World Cup

=== National team ===
No.	Date	Venue	Opponent	Score	Result	Competition
1.	3 March 2010	Spencer Park, Brisbane, Australia	Australia	1–0	2–2	Friendly
2.	3 March 2010	Spencer Park, Brisbane, Australia	Australia	2–2	2–2	Friendly
3.	15 February 2012	Yongchuan Sports Center, Chongqing, China	South Korea	1–0	1–0	2012 Four Nations Tournament

== See also ==
- North Korea at the 2012 Summer Olympics
