= Sin Ui-gun =

North Korean football manager

Personal information
- Date of birth: 1 October 1958 (age 68)

Managerial career
- Years: Team
- 2012–2018: North Korea Women
- 2012: North Korea Women U20
- 2014: North Korea Women U17

Sin Ui-gun (Korean: 신의근; born 1 October 1958) is a North Korean football manager.

== Career ==
Sin was the head coach of the North Korea women's national team at the 2012 Summer Olympics.
