= Ro Chol-ok =

North Korean footballer

Personal information
- Date of birth: 3 January 1993 (age 33)
- Place of birth: North Korea
- Position: Defender

Senior career*
| Years | Team | Apps | (Gls) |
| 2012 | April 25 | | |

International career
| 2012 | North Korea | 6 (?) | (0) |
- * Club domestic league appearances and goals

- Ro Chol-ok
- Hangul: 로철옥
- RR: Ro Cheolok
- MR: Ro Ch'ŏrok

Ro Chol-ok (born 3 January 1993) was a North Korean football defender who played for the North Korea women's national football team at the 2012 Summer Olympics. At the club level, she played for April 25.

== See also ==
- North Korea at the 2012 Summer Olympics
