= Jon Myong-hwa =

North Korean footballer (born 1993)

Personal information
- Date of birth: 9 August 1993 (age 33)
- Place of birth: Pyongyang, North Korea
- Position: Midfielder

Senior career*
Years	Team	Apps	(Gls)
2012	April 25		

International career
2012	North Korea	24 (?)	(3)
- * Club domestic league appearances and goals

- Jon Myong-hwa
- Hangul: 전명화
- RR: Jeon Myeonghwa
- MR: Chŏn Myŏnghwa

Jon Myong-hwa (Korean: 전명화; born 9 August 1993) is a female North Korean football midfielder.

She was part of the North Korea women's national football team at the 2012 Summer Olympics. On club level she played for April 25.

== International goals ==
=== Under-19 ===
No.	Date	Venue	Opponent	Score	Result	Competition
1.	4 August 2009	Wuhan, China	Vietnam	2–0	6–0	2009 AFC U-19 Women's Championship
2.	4 August 2009	Wuhan, China	Vietnam	3–0	6–0	2009 AFC U-19 Women's Championship
3.	4 August 2009	Wuhan, China	Vietnam	4–0	6–0	2009 AFC U-19 Women's Championship
4.	10 October 2011	Ho Chi Minh City, Vietnam	Vietnam	1–0	5–0	2011 AFC U-19 Women's Championship

=== National team ===
No.	Date	Venue	Opponent	Score	Result	Competition
1.	20 May 2010	Chengdu Sports Centre, Chengdu, China	Thailand	1–0	3–0	2010 AFC Women's Asian Cup

== See also ==
- North Korea at the 2012 Summer Olympics
