= Choe Yong-sim =

North Korean footballer (born 1990)

Personal information
- Date of birth: 13 October 1990 (age 36)
- Place of birth: Pyongyang, North Korea
- Height: 1.72 m (5 ft 8 in)
- Position: Defender

Senior career*
Years	Team	Apps	(Gls)
- Pyongyang City

International career
- North Korea
- * Club domestic league appearances and goals

- Choe Yong-sim
- Hangul: 최영심
- RR: Choe Yeongsim
- MR: Ch'oe Yŏngsim

Choe Yong-sim (Korean pronunciation: [tsʰø.jʌŋ.ɕim]; born 13 October 1990 in Pyongyang) is a North Korean women's international footballer who plays as a defender.

She is a member of the North Korea women's national football team. She was part of the team at the 2010 Asian Games, and 2012 Summer Olympics. At club level, she played for Pyongyang City in North Korea.
