= Jo Yun-mi (footballer, born 1989) =

North Korean footballer

- Hangul: 조윤미
- RR: Jo Yunmi
- MR: Cho Yunmi

Jo Yun-mi (Korean pronunciation: [tso.jun.mi]; born 22 May 1989) is a North Korean football player that plays for the North Korea women's national football team. She played in the 2012 Summer Olympics.
