= 2012 FIFA U-20 Women's World Cup squads =

This article lists the squads for the 2012 FIFA U-20 Women's World Cup, held in Japan. Each competing federation was allowed a 21-player squad, which had to be submitted to FIFA.

== Group A ==
=== Japan ===
Coach: Hiroshi Yoshida

No.	Pos.	Player	Date of birth (age)	Caps	Goals	Club
1	GK	Sakiko Ikeda	8 September 1992 (aged 19)	—	—	(Japan Football Association) Urawa Red Diamonds Ladies
2	MF	Chika Kato	28 February 1994 (aged 18)	—	—	(Japan Football Association) Urawa Red Diamonds Ladies
3	DF	Shiori Kinoshita	17 August 1992 (aged 20)	—	—	(Japan Football Association) NTV Beleza
4	DF	Riho Sakamoto	7 July 1992 (aged 20)	—	—	(Japan Football Association) Urawa Red Diamonds Ladies
5	DF	Haruka Hamada	26 January 1993 (aged 19)	—	—	(Japan Football Association) Speranza F.C. Osaka Takatsuki
6	MF	Ayu Nakada	15 August 1993 (aged 19)	—	—	(Japan Football Association) INAC Kobe Leonessa
7	MF	Nozomi Fujita (c)	21 February 1992 (aged 20)	—	—	(Japan Football Association) Urawa Red Diamonds Ladies
8	MF	Hikaru Naomoto	3 March 1994 (aged 18)	—	—	(Japan Football Association) Urawa Red Diamonds Ladies
9	MF	Yoko Tanaka	30 July 1993 (aged 19)	—	—	(Japan Football Association) INAC Kobe Leonessa
10	FW	Kumi Yokoyama	13 August 1993 (aged 19)	—	—	(Japan Football Association) Okayama Yunogo Belle
11	FW	Mina Tanaka	28 April 1994 (aged 18)	—	—	(Japan Football Association) NTV Beleza
12	GK	Rei Takenaka	18 May 1992 (aged 20)	—	—	(Japan Football Association) INAC Kobe Leonessa
13	FW	Ayaka Michigami	27 July 1994 (aged 18)	—	—	(Japan Football Association) Tokiwagi Gakuen Hhigh School
14	MF	Hanae Shibata	27 July 1992 (aged 20)	—	—	(Japan Football Association) Urawa Red Diamonds Ladies
15	DF	Yushika Nakamura	21 August 1992 (aged 19)	—	—	(Japan Football Association) Kanto Gakuen University
16	DF	Naoko Wada	24 May 1993 (aged 19)	—	—	(Japan Football Association) Urawa Red Diamonds Ladies
17	DF	Hikari Takagi	21 May 1993 (aged 19)	—	—	(Japan Football Association) Waseda University
18	FW	Asuka Nishikawa	22 April 1992 (aged 20)	—	—	(Japan Football Association) FC Takahashi Kibi International University
19	MF	Yu Nakasato	14 July 1994 (aged 18)	—	—	(Japan Football Association) NTV Beleza
20	DF	Mayo Doko	3 May 1996 (aged 16)	—	—	(Japan Football Association) NTV Beleza
21	GK	Arisa Mochizuki	15 April 1994 (aged 18)	—	—	(Japan Football Association) NTV Menina

=== Mexico ===
Coach: Leonardo Cuéllar

No.	Pos.	Player	Date of birth (age)	Caps	Goals	Club
1	GK	Cecilia Santiago	19 October 1994 (aged 17)			(Mexican Football Federation) Santos Laguna
2	DF	Arianna Romero	29 July 1992 (aged 20)			(United States Soccer Federation) Nebraska Cornhuskers
3	DF	Christina Murillo	28 January 1993 (aged 19)			(United States Soccer Federation) Michigan Wolverines
4	DF	Bianca Sierra	25 June 1992 (aged 20)			(United States Soccer Federation) Auburn Tigers
5	DF	Valeria Miranda	18 August 1992 (aged 20)			(Mexican Football Federation) UNAM
6	MF	Olivia Jiménez	26 February 1992 (aged 20)			(United States Soccer Federation) Arizona Rush
7	MF	Nayeli Rangel (c)	28 February 1992 (aged 20)			(Mexican Football Federation) UANL
8	FW	Ariana Martínez	25 January 1992 (aged 20)			(United States Soccer Federation) California Golden Bears
9	FW	Sofia Huerta	14 December 1992 (aged 19)			(United States Soccer Federation) Santa Clara Broncos
10	MF	Natalia Gómez Junco	9 October 1992 (aged 19)			(United States Soccer Federation) Memphis Tigers
11	FW	Chrystal Martínez	12 October 1993 (aged 18)			(United States Soccer Federation) American River College
12	GK	Alejandra Gutiérrez	2 July 1994 (aged 18)			(Mexican Football Federation) Selección Morelos
13	DF	Ashley Kotero	23 November 1992 (aged 19)			(United States Soccer Federation) Auburn Tigers
14	DF	Kenia Sánchez	25 March 1992 (aged 20)			(Mexican Football Federation) Juventus Femenil Tijuana
15	DF	Mariel Gutiérrez	6 August 1994 (aged 18)			(Mexican Football Federation) Andrea's Soccer
16	DF	Amber Hernández	14 July 1993 (aged 19)			(United States Soccer Federation) South Valley Chivas
17	MF	Amanda Pérez	31 July 1994 (aged 18)			(United States Soccer Federation) PSV Union
18	MF	Yamile Franco	7 July 1992 (aged 20)			(Mexican Football Federation) Andrea's Soccer
19	FW	Tanya Samarzich	28 December 1994 (aged 17)			(United States Soccer Federation) Legends FC
20	FW	Daniela Solís	19 April 1993 (aged 19)			(United States Soccer Federation) Portland State Vikings
21	GK	Itzel González	14 August 1994 (aged 18)			(United States Soccer Federation) UC San Diego Tritons

=== New Zealand ===
Coach: Aaron McFarland

No.	Pos.	Player	Date of birth (age)	Caps	Goals	Club
1	GK	Erin Nayler	17 April 1992 (aged 20)			(New Zealand Football) Eastern Suburbs
2	DF	Bridgette Armstrong	11 September 1992 (aged 19)			(New Zealand Football) Glenfield Rovers
3	MF	Rebecca Burrows	29 August 1994 (aged 17)			(New Zealand Football) Three Kings United
4	MF	Nadia Pearl	20 October 1992 (aged 19)			(New Zealand Football) Three Kings United
5	MF	Tayla O'Brien	6 July 1994 (aged 18)			(New Zealand Football) Lynn-Avon United
6	MF	Evie Millynn	23 November 1994 (aged 17)			(New Zealand Football) Eastern Suburbs
7	DF	Holly Patterson	16 April 1994 (aged 18)			(New Zealand Football) Claudelands Rovers
8	MF	Olivia Chance	5 October 1993 (aged 18)			(New Zealand Football) Claudelands Rovers
9	MF	Georgia Brown	18 October 1993 (aged 18)			(New Zealand Football) Three Kings United
10	MF	Kate Loye	15 May 1993 (aged 19)			(New Zealand Football) Claudelands Rovers
11	FW	Katie Rood	2 September 1992 (aged 19)			(The Football Association) Lincoln Ladies
12	FW	Stephanie Skilton	27 October 1994 (aged 17)			(New Zealand Football) Glenfield Rovers
13	FW	Rosie White (c)	6 June 1993 (aged 19)			(United States Soccer Federation) UCLA
14	MF	Katie Bowen	15 April 1994 (aged 18)			(New Zealand Football) Glenfield Rovers
15	DF	Tessa Huntington	2 September 1994 (aged 17)			(New Zealand Football) Three Kings United
16	DF	Ashleigh Ward	18 August 1994 (aged 18)			(New Zealand Football) Glenfield Rovers
17	FW	Hannah Wilkinson	28 May 1992 (aged 20)			(United States Soccer Federation) Tennessee Lady Volunteers
18	DF	Caitlin Smallfield	27 August 1994 (aged 17)			(New Zealand Football) Glenfield Rovers
19	MF	Lucy Carter	19 August 1993 (aged 19)			(New Zealand Football) Fencibles United
20	GK	Corina Brown	1 February 1994 (aged 18)			(New Zealand Football) Three Kings United
21	GK	Jess Reddaway	12 January 1994 (aged 18)			(New Zealand Football) Lynn-Avon United

=== Switzerland ===
Coach: Yannick Schwery

No.	Pos.	Player	Date of birth (age)	Caps	Goals	Club
1	GK	Pascale Küffer	13 November 1992 (aged 19)			(German Football Association) VfL Sindelfingen
2	MF	Audrey Wuichet	29 June 1995 (aged 17)			(Swiss Football Association) Yverdon Féminin
3	DF	Carolyn Mallaun	30 March 1992 (aged 20)			(Swiss Football Association) Yverdon Féminin
4	DF	Carina Gerber (c)	8 May 1993 (aged 19)			(Swiss Football Association) BSC YB Frauen
5	MF	Anja Thürig	3 May 1995 (aged 17)			(Swiss Football Association) Grasshopper
6	MF	Lia Wälti	19 April 1993 (aged 19)			(Swiss Football Association) BSC YB Frauen
7	MF	Cinzia Jörg	23 May 1992 (aged 20)			(Swiss Football Association) St. Gallen
8	MF	Egzona Seljimi	13 September 1993 (aged 18)			(Swiss Football Association) Zürich Frauen
9	FW	Eseosa Aigbogun	23 May 1993 (aged 19)			(Swiss Football Association) Basel
10	MF	Mirnije Selimi	22 October 1996 (aged 15)			(Swiss Football Association) Grasshopper
11	FW	Cora Canetta	6 January 1992 (aged 20)			(Swiss Football Association) Zürich Frauen
12	GK	Nadine Böni	3 May 1994 (aged 18)			(Swiss Football Association) Kriens
13	FW	Sabrina Ribeaud	7 May 1995 (aged 17)			(Swiss Football Association) Basel
14	MF	Nadine Fässler	7 August 1993 (aged 19)			(Swiss Football Association) St. Gallen
15	DF	Sarina Schenkel	5 August 1993 (aged 19)			(Swiss Football Association) BSC YB Frauen
16	MF	Carmen Pulver	18 September 1995 (aged 16)			(Swiss Football Association) Grasshopper
17	DF	Fabienne Rochaix	30 September 1994 (aged 17)			(Swiss Football Association) Grasshopper
18	MF	Natasha Gensetter	4 December 1993 (aged 18)			(Swiss Football Association) Grasshopper
19	MF	Karin Bernet	30 November 1994 (aged 17)			(Swiss Football Association) Zürich Frauen
20	DF	Noelle Maritz	23 December 1995 (aged 16)			(Swiss Football Association) Zürich Frauen
21	GK	Sina Autino	25 May 1992 (aged 20)			(Swiss Football Association) Basel

== Group B ==
=== Brazil ===
Coach: Caio Couto

No.	Pos.	Player	Date of birth (age)	Caps	Goals	Club
1	GK	Daniele	21 March 1993 (aged 19)			(Brazilian Football Confederation) Foz Cataratas
2	DF	Giovanna Oliveira	28 August 1992 (aged 19)			(Brazilian Football Confederation) São José
3	DF	Ingrid	8 October 1993 (aged 18)			(Brazilian Football Confederation) Juventus-SP
4	DF	Tayla	9 May 1992 (aged 20)			(Brazilian Football Confederation) Foz Cataratas
5	MF	Maria	7 July 1993 (aged 19)			(Brazilian Football Confederation) Vitória das Tabocas
6	FW	Andressa Alves	10 November 1992 (aged 19)			(Brazilian Football Confederation) Foz Cataratas
7	FW	Ketlen	7 January 1992 (aged 20)			(Brazilian Football Confederation) Vitória das Tabocas
8	MF	Lucimara	14 April 1993 (aged 19)			(Brazilian Football Confederation) Atlético Mineiro
9	FW	Glaucia	30 January 1993 (aged 19)			(Korea Football Association) Hyundai Steel Red Angels
10	MF	Beatriz	17 December 1993 (aged 18)			(Brazilian Football Confederation) Vitória das Tabocas
11	FW	Thaís Guedes (c)	20 January 1993 (aged 19)			(Brazilian Football Confederation) Vitória das Tabocas
12	GK	Letícia	13 August 1994 (aged 18)			(Brazilian Football Confederation) Vitória das Tabocas
13	DF	Caroline	14 May 1993 (aged 19)			(Brazilian Football Confederation) Coritiba
14	DF	Amanda	23 February 1993 (aged 19)			(Brazilian Football Confederation) Foz Cataratas
15	DF	Patricia	4 May 1994 (aged 18)			(Brazilian Football Confederation) Vitória
16	DF	Jucinara	3 August 1993 (aged 19)			(Brazilian Football Confederation) Centro Olímpico
17	FW	Giovanna	23 February 1993 (aged 19)			(Brazilian Football Confederation) Foz Cataratas
18	MF	Luana	2 May 1993 (aged 19)			(Brazilian Football Confederation) Centro Olímpico
19	FW	Carol	28 October 1994 (aged 17)			(Brazilian Football Confederation) Vitória das Tabocas
20	MF	Bruna	7 July 1992 (aged 20)			(Brazilian Football Confederation) Manchester
21	GK	Monique	5 March 1992 (aged 20)			(Brazilian Football Confederation) Centro Olímpico

=== Italy ===
Coach: Corrado Corradini

No.	Pos.	Player	Date of birth (age)	Caps	Goals	Club
1	GK	Chiara Valzolgher	8 January 1992 (aged 20)			(Italian Football Federation) Südtirol
2	DF	Cecilia Salvai	2 December 1993 (aged 18)			(Italian Football Federation) Torino
3	DF	Michela Ledri	12 May 1992 (aged 20)			(Italian Football Federation) Bardolino
4	MF	Michela Franco	27 January 1992 (aged 20)			(Italian Football Federation) Torino
5	DF	Francesca Vitale	28 March 1992 (aged 20)			(Italian Football Federation) Milan
6	DF	Roberta Filippozzi	10 March 1992 (aged 20)			(Italian Football Federation) Napoli
7	FW	Elisa Lecce	3 February 1993 (aged 19)			(Italian Football Federation) Napoli
8	MF	Claudia Mauri	18 December 1992 (aged 19)			(Italian Football Federation) Mozzanica
9	MF	Lisa Alborghetti	19 June 1993 (aged 19)			(Italian Football Federation) Brescia
10	MF	Martina Rosucci (c)	9 May 1992 (aged 20)			(Italian Football Federation) Brescia
11	FW	Katia Coppola	5 May 1993 (aged 19)			(Italian Football Federation) Como 2000
12	GK	Laura Giuliani	5 June 1993 (aged 19)			(Italian Football Federation) Como 2000
13	DF	Valentina Pedretti	5 October 1993 (aged 18)			(Italian Football Federation) Brescia
14	DF	Elena Linari	15 April 1994 (aged 18)			(Italian Football Federation) Firenze
15	MF	Federica Di Criscio	12 May 1993 (aged 19)			(Italian Football Federation) Bardolino
16	DF	Ana Carolina Cannone	21 February 1995 (aged 17)			(Italian Football Federation) Como 2000
17	FW	Sofia Luciani	31 January 1993 (aged 19)			(Italian Football Federation) Jesina
18	MF	Cecilia Re	28 March 1994 (aged 18)			(Italian Football Federation) Fiammamonza 1970
19	FW	Luisa Pugnali	20 March 1994 (aged 18)			(Italian Football Federation) Grifo Perugia
20	MF	Arianna Ferrati	3 January 1995 (aged 17)			(Italian Football Federation) Firenze
21	GK	Valentina Casaroli	9 July 1993 (aged 19)			(Italian Football Federation) Roma

=== Nigeria ===
Coach: Okon Edwin

No.	Pos.	Player	Date of birth (age)	Caps	Goals	Club
1	GK	Ibubeleye Whyte	9 January 1992 (aged 20)			(Nigeria Football Federation) River Angels
2	DF	Blessing Edoho	5 September 1992 (aged 19)			(Nigeria Football Federation) Pelican Stars
3	DF	Gloria Ofoegbu (c)	3 January 1992 (aged 20)			(Nigeria Football Federation) River Angels
4	DF	Ugo Njoku	27 November 1994 (aged 17)			(Nigeria Football Federation) River Angels
5	MF	Cecilia Nku	26 October 1992 (aged 19)			(Nigeria Football Federation) Bayelsa Queens
6	DF	Jennifer Osawaru	7 January 1992 (aged 20)			(Nigeria Football Federation) River Angels
7	FW	Esther Sunday	13 March 1992 (aged 20)			(Nigeria Football Federation) Sunshine Queens
8	FW	Ebere Orji	23 December 1992 (aged 19)			(Nigeria Football Federation) River Angels
9	FW	Desire Oparanozie	17 December 1993 (aged 18)			(Nigeria Football Federation) Delta Queens
10	MF	Ngozi Okobi	14 December 1993 (aged 18)			(Nigeria Football Federation) Delta Queens
11	FW	Winifred Eyebhoria	14 February 1994 (aged 18)			(Nigeria Football Federation) River Angels
12	GK	Chioma Nwankwo	9 November 1992 (aged 19)			(Nigeria Football Federation) Pelican Stars
13	DF	Fasilat Adeyemo	22 December 1994 (aged 17)			(Nigeria Football Federation) Confluence Queens
14	MF	Asisat Oshoala	9 October 1994 (aged 17)			(Nigeria Football Federation) Robo
15	DF	Josephine Chukwunonye	19 March 1992 (aged 20)			(Nigeria Football Federation) River Angels
16	MF	Osarenoma Igbinovia	5 June 1996 (aged 16)			(Nigeria Football Federation) Inneh Queens
17	FW	Francisca Ordega	19 October 1993 (aged 18)			(Nigeria Football Federation) River Angels
18	FW	Charity Adule	7 November 1993 (aged 18)			(Nigeria Football Federation) Bayelsa Queens
19	FW	Abosede Olukayode	14 June 1994 (aged 18)			(Nigeria Football Federation) Cerezo Angels
20	DF	Chidinma Okoro	15 August 1992 (aged 20)			(Nigeria Football Federation) River Angels
21	GK	Damilola Akano	30 December 1993 (aged 18)			(Nigeria Football Federation) Sunshine Queens

=== South Korea ===
Coach: Jong Song-chon

No.	Pos.	Player	Date of birth (age)	Caps	Goals	Club
1	GK	Jeon Ha-neul	6 July 1992 (aged 20)			(Korea Football Association) Yeojoo Institute of Technology
2	DF	Seo Hyun-sook	6 January 1992 (aged 20)			(Korea Football Association) Goyang Daekyo Noonnoppi
3	DF	Jang Sel-gi	31 May 1994 (aged 18)			(Korea Football Association) Gangil Girls' High School
4	DF	Choi So-mi	22 June 1992 (aged 20)			(Korea Football Association) Yeojoo Institute of Technology
5	DF	Kim Ji-hye	4 May 1992 (aged 20)			(Korea Football Association) Hanyang Women's University
6	DF	Shin Dam-yeong	2 October 1993 (aged 18)			(Korea Football Association) Ulsan College
7	MF	Lee Young-ju (c)	22 April 1992 (aged 20)			(Korea Football Association) Hanyang Women's University
8	MF	Lee Jung-eun	15 December 1993 (aged 18)			(Korea Football Association) Hanyang Women's University
9	FW	Moon Mi-ra	28 February 1992 (aged 20)			(Korea Football Association) Hyundai Steel Red Angels
10	FW	Yeo Min-ji	27 April 1993 (aged 19)			(Korea Football Association) Ulsan College
11	FW	Jeoun Eun-ha	28 January 1993 (aged 19)			(Korea Football Association) Gangwon Provincial College
12	MF	Choe Yu-ri	16 September 1994 (aged 17)			(Korea Football Association) Hyundai Info-Tech High School
13	MF	Kim A-reum	7 August 1993 (aged 19)			(Korea Football Association) Ulsan College
14	MF	Lee So-dam	12 October 1994 (aged 17)			(Korea Football Association) Hyundai Info-Tech High School
15	FW	Choi Yoo-jung	25 January 1992 (aged 20)			(Korea Football Association) Suwon FMC
16	MF	Kim Ji-eun	16 November 1992 (aged 19)			(Korea Football Association) Gangwon Provincial College
17	DF	Kim Hye-yeong	26 February 1995 (aged 17)			(Korea Football Association) Hyundai Info-Tech High School
18	GK	Shim Dan-bi	18 January 1993 (aged 19)			(Korea Football Association) Ulsan College
19	DF	Kim Du-ri	2 March 1994 (aged 18)			(Korea Football Association) Hyundai Info-Tech High School
20	FW	Lee Geum-min	7 April 1994 (aged 18)			(Korea Football Association) Hyundai Info-Tech High School
21	GK	Min Yu-kyeong	9 June 1995 (aged 17)			(Korea Football Association) Gwangyang Girls' High School

== Group C ==
=== Argentina ===
Coach: Carlos Borrello

No.	Pos.	Player	Date of birth (age)	Caps	Goals	Club
1	GK	Laurina Oliveros (c)	10 September 1993 (aged 18)			(Argentine Football Association) UAI Urquiza
2	DF	Agustina Barroso	20 May 1993 (aged 19)			(Argentine Football Association) UAI Urquiza
3	DF	Noelia Espíndola	6 April 1992 (aged 20)			(Argentine Football Association) San Lorenzo
4	DF	Yanina Hernández	4 May 1992 (aged 20)			(Argentine Football Association) AFA
5	MF	Camila Gómez Ares	26 October 1994 (aged 17)			(Argentine Football Association) River Plate
6	DF	Adriana Sachs	25 December 1993 (aged 18)			(Argentine Football Association) Huracán
7	FW	Betina Soriano	1 March 1994 (aged 18)			(Argentine Football Association) Belgrano
8	MF	Micaela Sandoval	27 January 1992 (aged 20)			(Argentine Football Association) Estudiantes
9	FW	Yael Oviedo	22 May 1992 (aged 20)			(Argentine Football Association) Boca Juniors
10	MF	Mariana Larroquette	24 October 1992 (aged 19)			(Argentine Football Association) River Plate
11	MF	Florencia Bonsegundo	14 July 1993 (aged 19)			(Argentine Football Association) Huracán
12	GK	Romina Fontana	30 November 1992 (aged 19)			(Argentine Football Association) AFA
13	DF	Dianela Rotela	10 August 1995 (aged 17)			(Argentine Football Association) Belgrano
14	DF	Constanza Vázquez	10 September 1995 (aged 16)			(Argentine Football Association) San Lorenzo
15	FW	Johanna Chamorro	27 April 1992 (aged 20)			(Argentine Football Association) AFA
16	MF	Micaela Cabrera	18 July 1997 (aged 15)			(Argentine Football Association) Independiente
17	MF	Gabriela Iribarne	24 March 1993 (aged 19)			(United States Soccer Federation) Rice Owls
18	FW	Aldana Benitez	18 December 1996 (aged 15)			(Argentine Football Association) AFA
19	MF	Florencia Arce	23 May 1994 (aged 18)			(Argentine Football Association) AFA
20	MF	Jimena Vera	10 January 1992 (aged 20)			(Argentine Football Association) AFA
21	GK	Sabrina Pagliero	21 January 1994 (aged 18)			(Argentine Football Association) AFA

=== Canada ===
Coach: Andrew Olivieri

No.	Pos.	Player	Date of birth (age)	Caps	Goals	Club
1	GK	Dayle Colpitts	18 April 1992 (aged 20)			(United States Soccer Federation) Virginia Tech Hokies
2	DF	Jade Kovacevic	4 March 1994 (aged 18)			(United States Soccer Federation) LSU Tigers
3	DF	Mélissa Roy	2 October 1993 (aged 18)			(Canadian Soccer Association) Collège François-Xavier-Garneau
4	DF	Rachel Melhado	24 September 1992 (aged 19)			(United States Soccer Federation) Louisville Cardinals
5	MF	Sarah Robbins	30 July 1992 (aged 20)			(United States Soccer Federation) Kansas Jayhawks
6	DF	Shelina Zadorsky (c)	24 October 1992 (aged 19)			(United States Soccer Federation) Michigan Wolverines
7	MF	Kylie Davis	22 July 1994 (aged 18)			(United States Soccer Federation) Memphis Tigers
8	MF	Danica Wu	13 August 1992 (aged 20)			(United States Soccer Federation) Ohio State Buckeyes
9	FW	Christine Exeter	3 September 1992 (aged 19)			(United States Soccer Federation) Louisville Cardinals
10	FW	Christabel Oduro	1 November 1992 (aged 19)			(United States Soccer Federation) Memphis Tigers
11	FW	Jenna Richardson	6 July 1992 (aged 20)			(United States Soccer Federation) Oregon State Beavers
12	DF	Nicole Setterlund	16 February 1993 (aged 19)			(United States Soccer Federation) Washington State Cougars
13	FW	Caroline Beaulne	30 April 1994 (aged 18)			(United States Soccer Federation) Saint Mary's Gaels
14	MF	Constance de Chantal-Dumont	11 March 1992 (aged 20)			(Canadian Soccer Association) Montréal Carabins
15	DF	Vanessa Legault-Cordisco	5 November 1992 (aged 19)			(United States Soccer Federation) Marquette Golden Eagles
16	MF	Jaclyn Sawicki	14 November 1992 (aged 19)			(Canadian Soccer Association) Victoria Vikes
17	FW	Nkem Ezurike	19 March 1992 (aged 20)			(United States Soccer Federation) Michigan Wolverines
18	GK	Sabrina D'Angelo	11 May 1993 (aged 19)			(United States Soccer Federation) South Carolina Gamecocks
19	FW	Adriana Leon	2 October 1992 (aged 19)			(United States Soccer Federation) Florida Gators
20	MF	Catherine Charron-Delage	15 June 1992 (aged 20)			(Canadian Soccer Association) Montréal Carabins
21	GK	Geneviève Richard	17 August 1992 (aged 20)			(United States Soccer Federation) Wisconsin Badgers

=== North Korea ===
Coach: Sin Ui-gun

No.	Pos.	Player	Date of birth (age)	Caps	Goals	Club
1	GK	Choe Kyong-im	15 July 1993 (aged 19)			(DPR Korea Football Association) Pyongyang City
2	DF	Kim Nam-hui	4 March 1994 (aged 18)			(DPR Korea Football Association) April 25
3	MF	Ri Yong-mi	8 May 1993 (aged 19)			(DPR Korea Football Association) Amrokgang
4	DF	Kim Un-ha	23 March 1993 (aged 19)			(DPR Korea Football Association) Sobaeksu
5	DF	Yun Song-mi	28 January 1992 (aged 20)			(DPR Korea Football Association) Pyongyang City
6	DF	Ryu Un-jong	20 April 1992 (aged 20)			(DPR Korea Football Association) Rimyongsu
7	MF	Kim Un-ju	6 June 1992 (aged 20)			(DPR Korea Football Association) April 25
8	MF	Jon Myong-hwa	9 August 1993 (aged 19)			(DPR Korea Football Association) April 25
9	DF	Pak Kyong-mi	8 April 1993 (aged 19)			(DPR Korea Football Association) April 25
10	FW	Yun Hyon-hi	9 September 1992 (aged 19)			(DPR Korea Football Association) April 25
11	FW	Kim Un-hwa	30 September 1992 (aged 19)			(DPR Korea Football Association) Wolmido
12	MF	Kim Un-hyang	26 August 1993 (aged 18)			(DPR Korea Football Association) April 25
13	MF	O Hui-sun (c)	22 November 1993 (aged 18)			(DPR Korea Football Association) Sobaeksu
14	DF	Pong Son-hwa	18 February 1993 (aged 19)			(DPR Korea Football Association) Pyongyang City
15	DF	Ri Nam-sil	13 February 1994 (aged 18)			(DPR Korea Football Association) Sobaeksu
16	MF	Ri Hyang-hui	30 September 1992 (aged 19)			(DPR Korea Football Association) April 25
17	FW	Kwon Song-hwa	5 February 1992 (aged 20)			(DPR Korea Football Association) April 25
18	GK	O Chang-ran	5 September 1992 (aged 19)			(DPR Korea Football Association) Mangyongbong
19	MF	Yu Jong-im	6 December 1993 (aged 18)			(DPR Korea Football Association) Amrokgang
20	MF	Kim Su-gyong	4 January 1995 (aged 17)			(DPR Korea Football Association) April 25
21	GK	Kim Chol-ok	15 October 1994 (aged 17)			(DPR Korea Football Association) April 25

=== Norway ===
Coach: Jarl Torske

No.	Pos.	Player	Date of birth (age)	Caps	Goals	Club
1	GK	Nora Neset Gjøen	20 February 1992 (aged 20)			(Norwegian Football Federation) Sandviken
2	DF	Anja Sønstevold	21 June 1992 (aged 20)			(Norwegian Football Federation) Kolbotn
3	DF	Ingrid Søndenå	20 December 1993 (aged 18)			(Norwegian Football Federation) Røa
4	DF	Ida Aardalen	27 July 1993 (aged 19)			(Norwegian Football Federation) Sarpsborg 08
5	DF	Anette Tengesdal	28 April 1992 (aged 20)			(Norwegian Football Federation) Klepp
6	MF	Maria Thorisdottir	5 June 1993 (aged 19)			(Norwegian Football Federation) Klepp
7	MF	Andrine Hegerberg	6 June 1993 (aged 19)			(Norwegian Football Federation) Stabæk
8	MF	Caroline Graham Hansen	18 February 1995 (aged 17)			(Norwegian Football Federation) Stabæk
9	FW	Ada Hegerberg	10 July 1995 (aged 17)			(Norwegian Football Federation) Stabæk
10	FW	Melissa Bjånesøy	18 April 1992 (aged 20)			(Norwegian Football Federation) Sandviken
11	FW	Kristine Wigdahl Hegland (c)	8 August 1992 (aged 20)			(Norwegian Football Federation) Arna-Bjørnar
12	GK	Ane Fimreite	7 July 1993 (aged 19)			(Norwegian Football Federation) Arna-Bjørnar
13	DF	Ingrid Bakke	3 September 1994 (aged 17)			(Norwegian Football Federation) Stabæk
14	DF	Maren Knudsen	24 July 1993 (aged 19)			(Norwegian Football Federation) Sandviken
15	DF	Ina Skaug	2 April 1992 (aged 20)			(Norwegian Football Federation) Stabæk
16	MF	Cathrine Dekkerhus	17 September 1992 (aged 19)			(Norwegian Football Federation) Stabæk Fotball
17	MF	Guro Reiten	26 July 1994 (aged 18)			(Norwegian Football Federation) Kattem
18	DF	Stine Reinås	15 July 1994 (aged 18)			(Norwegian Football Federation) Kattem
18	FW	Andrea Thun	27 June 1994 (aged 18)			(Norwegian Football Federation) Sarpsborg 08
20	FW	Emilie Haavi	16 June 1992 (aged 20)			(Norwegian Football Federation) Røa
21	GK	Hilde Olsen	2 March 1992 (aged 20)			(Norwegian Football Federation) Klepp

== Group D ==
=== China PR ===
Coach: Yin Tiesheng

No.	Pos.	Player	Date of birth (age)	Caps	Goals	Club
1	GK	Shen Li	28 July 1992 (aged 20)			(Chinese Football Association) Shanghai SVT
2	DF	Wu Haiyan	26 February 1993 (aged 19)			(Chinese Football Association) Zhejiang Hangzhou
3	DF	Wang Yingying	15 September 1992 (aged 19)			(Chinese Football Association) Shanghai SVT
4	DF	Luo Guiping	20 April 1993 (aged 19)			(Chinese Football Association) Guangdong Haiyin
5	DF	Liu Shanshan	16 March 1992 (aged 20)			(Chinese Football Association) Hebei Ticai
6	DF	Huang Yini	20 January 1993 (aged 19)			(Chinese Football Association) Shanghai SVT
7	MF	Zhang Xin	23 May 1992 (aged 20)			(Chinese Football Association) Shanghai SVT
8	FW	Zhang Jieli	4 January 1993 (aged 19)			(Chinese Football Association) Shanghai SVT
9	FW	Li Ying	7 January 1993 (aged 19)			(Chinese Football Association) Zhejiang Hangzhou
10	MF	Song Sicheng (c)	17 January 1992 (aged 20)			(Chinese Football Association) Jiangsu Huatai
11	FW	Yao Shuangyan	13 August 1992 (aged 20)			(Chinese Football Association) Jiangsu Huatai
12	GK	Cai Wenfei	18 August 1993 (aged 19)			(Chinese Football Association) Bayi Xiangtan
13	MF	Han Jiayuan	8 September 1993 (aged 18)			(Chinese Football Association) Bayi Xiangtan
14	DF	Su Xin	18 February 1993 (aged 19)			(Chinese Football Association) Beijing Baxy
15	MF	Wang Tingting	18 February 1992 (aged 20)			(Chinese Football Association) Shandong Huangming
16	MF	Zhao Xindi	8 January 1995 (aged 17)			(Chinese Football Association) Dalian Shide
17	DF	Lin Yuping	28 February 1992 (aged 20)			(Chinese Football Association) Bayi Xiangtan
18	MF	Wang Shuang	23 January 1995 (aged 17)			(Chinese Football Association) Wuhan Jiangda University
19	MF	Mu Yunrui	8 June 1992 (aged 20)			(Chinese Football Association) Tianjin Huisen
20	FW	Shen Lili	13 July 1992 (aged 20)			(Chinese Football Association) Hebei Ticai
21	GK	Xia Tingting	4 November 1993 (aged 18)			(Chinese Football Association) Beijing Baxy

=== Germany ===
Coach: Maren Meinert

No.	Pos.	Player	Date of birth (age)	Caps	Goals	Club
1	GK	Laura Benkarth	14 October 1992 (aged 19)			(German Football Association) SC Freiburg
2	DF	Leonie Maier	29 September 1992 (aged 19)			(German Football Association) SC 07 Bad Neuenahr
3	DF	Carolin Simon	24 November 1992 (aged 19)			(German Football Association) VfL Wolfsburg
4	DF	Jennifer Cramer	24 February 1993 (aged 19)			(German Football Association) 1. FFC Turbine Potsdam
5	DF	Luisa Wensing	8 February 1993 (aged 19)			(German Football Association) VfL Wolfsburg
6	MF	Kathrin Hendrich	6 April 1992 (aged 20)			(German Football Association) Bayer 04 Leverkusen
7	MF	Annabel Jäger	6 January 1994 (aged 18)			(German Football Association) VfL Wolfsburg
8	MF	Melanie Leupolz	14 April 1994 (aged 18)			(German Football Association) SC Freiburg
9	FW	Nicole Rolser	7 February 1992 (aged 20)			(German Football Association) SC 07 Bad Neuenahr
10	FW	Ramona Petzelberger (c)	13 November 1992 (aged 19)			(German Football Association) Bayer 04 Leverkusen
11	FW	Lena Lotzen	11 September 1993 (aged 18)			(German Football Association) FC Bayern Munich
12	GK	Meike Kämper	23 April 1994 (aged 18)			(German Football Association) FCR 2001 Duisburg
13	DF	Sophie Howard	17 September 1993 (aged 18)			(United States Soccer Federation) UCF Knights
14	FW	Dzsenifer Marozsán	18 April 1992 (aged 20)			(German Football Association) 1. FFC Frankfurt
15	MF	Karoline Heinze	15 October 1993 (aged 18)			(German Football Association) FF USV Jena
16	MF	Anja Hegenauer	9 December 1992 (aged 19)			(German Football Association) SC Freiburg
17	DF	Katharina Leiding	17 March 1994 (aged 18)			(German Football Association) SG Essen-Schönebeck
18	MF	Silvana Chojnowski	17 April 1994 (aged 18)			(German Football Association) 1. FFC Frankfurt
19	MF	Marie Pyko	8 August 1993 (aged 19)			(German Football Association) SC 07 Bad Neuenahr
20	MF	Lina Magull	15 August 1994 (aged 18)			(German Football Association) VfL Wolfsburg
21	GK	Anke Preuß	22 September 1992 (aged 19)			(German Football Association) TSG 1899 Hoffenheim

=== Ghana ===
Coach: Robert Sackey

No.	Pos.	Player	Date of birth (age)	Caps	Goals	Club
1	GK	Patricia Mantey	27 September 1992 (aged 19)			(Ghana Football Association) Mawuena Ladies
2	DF	Rebecca Asante	16 October 1994 (aged 17)			(Ghana Football Association) Vodafone Ladies
3	DF	Grace Adams	2 November 1995 (aged 16)			(Ghana Football Association) Ghana Post Ladies
4	DF	Cynthia Yiadom	25 December 1994 (aged 17)			(Ghana Football Association) Fabulous Ladies
5	DF	Rosemary Ampem	27 August 1992 (aged 19)			(Ghana Football Association) Ash Town Ladies
6	MF	Mercy Myles (c)	2 May 1992 (aged 20)			(Ghana Football Association) Nungua Ladies
7	DF	Linda Addai	12 December 1995 (aged 16)			(Ghana Football Association) Soccer Intellectual Ladies
8	MF	Elizabeth Addo	1 September 1993 (aged 18)			(Ghana Football Association) Athleta Ladies
9	FW	Alice Danso	25 December 1994 (aged 17)			(Ghana Football Association) Ghatel Ladies Accra
10	MF	Priscilla Saahene	24 July 1992 (aged 20)			(Ghana Football Association) Ash Town Ladies
11	MF	Deborah Afriyie	3 January 1992 (aged 20)			(Ghana Football Association) Oforikrom Ladies
12	DF	Janet Egyir	7 May 1992 (aged 20)			(Ghana Football Association) Hasaacas Ladies
13	MF	Jennifer Cudjoe	7 March 1994 (aged 18)			(Ghana Football Association) Hasaacas Ladies
14	DF	Faustina Ampah	30 November 1996 (aged 15)			(Ghana Football Association) Ash Town Ladies
15	MF	Mary Essiful	22 June 1993 (aged 19)			(Ghana Football Association) Soccer Intellectual Ladies
16	GK	Nana Asantewaa	28 December 1993 (aged 18)			(Ghana Football Association) Faith Ladies
17	FW	Veronica Appiah	28 June 1997 (aged 15)			(Ghana Football Association) Ash Town Ladies
18	MF	Beatrice Sesu	27 November 1995 (aged 16)			(Ghana Football Association) Ghana Post Ladies
19	FW	Candice Osei-Agyemang	14 September 1992 (aged 19)			(United States Soccer Federation) Northwest Nationals
20	FW	Florence Dadson	23 April 1992 (aged 20)			(United States Soccer Federation) Robert Morris Eagles
21	GK	Margaret Otoo	1 September 1993 (aged 18)			(Ghana Football Association) Ghatel Ladies Accra

=== United States ===
Coach: Steve Swanson

No.	Pos.	Player	Date of birth (age)	Caps	Goals	Club
1	GK	Bryane Heaberlin	2 November 1993 (aged 18)			(United States Soccer Federation) North Carolina Tar Heels
2	DF	Mollie Pathman	1 July 1992 (aged 20)			(United States Soccer Federation) Duke Blue Devils
3	DF	Cari Roccaro	18 July 1994 (aged 18)			(United States Soccer Federation) Albertson Fury
4	DF	Crystal Dunn	3 July 1992 (aged 20)			(United States Soccer Federation) North Carolina Tar Heels
5	FW	Maya Hayes	26 March 1992 (aged 20)			(United States Soccer Federation) Penn State Nittany Lions
6	MF	Morgan Brian	26 February 1993 (aged 19)			(United States Soccer Federation) Virginia Cavaliers
7	FW	Kealia Ohai	31 January 1992 (aged 20)			(United States Soccer Federation) North Carolina Tar Heels
8	DF	Julie Johnston (c)	6 April 1992 (aged 20)			(United States Soccer Federation) Santa Clara Broncos
9	FW	Chioma Ubogagu	10 September 1992 (aged 19)			(United States Soccer Federation) Stanford Cardinal
10	MF	Vanessa DiBernardo	15 May 1992 (aged 20)			(United States Soccer Federation) Illinois Fighting Illini
11	FW	Becca Wann	16 August 1992 (aged 20)			(United States Soccer Federation) Richmond Spiders
12	FW	Katie Stengel	29 February 1992 (aged 20)			(United States Soccer Federation) Wake Forest Demon Deacons
13	MF	Samantha Mewis	9 October 1992 (aged 19)			(United States Soccer Federation) UCLA Bruins
14	MF	Mandy Laddish	13 May 1992 (aged 20)			(United States Soccer Federation) Notre Dame Fighting Irish
15	DF	Kassey Kallman	6 May 1992 (aged 20)			(United States Soccer Federation) Florida State Seminoles
16	MF	Sarah Killion	27 July 1992 (aged 20)			(United States Soccer Federation) UCLA Bruins
17	MF	Taylor Schram	14 June 1992 (aged 20)			(United States Soccer Federation) Penn State Nittany Lions
18	GK	Abby Smith	4 October 1993 (aged 18)			(United States Soccer Federation) Dallas Texans Soccer Club
19	DF	Stephanie Amack	23 December 1994 (aged 17)			(United States Soccer Federation) Mustang Blast
20	FW	Kelly Cobb	26 August 1992 (aged 19)			(United States Soccer Federation) Duke Blue Devils
21	GK	Jami Kranich	27 May 1992 (aged 20)			(United States Soccer Federation) Villanova Wildcats
