= Jarl Torske =

Norwegian footballer and manager (born 1949)

Personal information
- Full name: Jarl Erik Torske
- Date of birth: 5 June 1949 (age 77)

Team information
- Current team: Molde (coach developer)

Youth career
- Sunndal

Senior career*
Years	Team	Apps	(Gls)
- Sunndal

Managerial career
- 1981–1988: Sunndal (player-manager)
- 1995–1996: Molde (assistant)
- 1995–1996: Norway U16/U17 (assistant)
- 1997–2000: Norway women (assistant)
- 2001–2014: Norway women U19
- 2014–2016: Norway (assistant)
- 2020–: Molde (coach developer)
- * Club domestic league appearances and goals

Jarl Torske (born 5 June 1949) is a retired Norwegian footballer and manager. His main accolades as a manager are an Olympic gold medal with the Norway women's team in 2000, and four UEFA U19 silver medals with Norway women's U19 team. He has also been assistant manager of Molde FK and Norway.

== Career ==
He hails from Sunndal Municipality and spent his playing career in Sunndal, which reached their all-time high level of the second tier in Norwegian football. He amassed 403 games across all competitions. He was also player-manager for Sunndal throughout most of the 1980s, before qualifying as a teacher. He was also a member of the municipal council of Sunndal Municipality for the Socialist Left Party.

Torske did regional work in the Football Association of Norway before being hired as Åge Hareide's assistant manager in Molde FK in 1995. He left after the 1996 season, only to become assistant manager under Per Mathias Høgmo for Norway women's national football team in 1997. They had worked together with the Norwegian boys' under-16 and under-17 national teams. Høgmo and Torske coached Norway to win the 2000 Olympic Games. The next year, Torske became manager of Norway women's national under-19 football team. Staying until 2014, he managed the team to win silver medals at the 2001, 2003, 2008 and 2011 UEFA Women's Under-19 Championships. Several key players during this era came from Torske's native Sunndal, notably Ada Hegerberg, Andrine Hegerberg and Guro Reiten.

In 2014 he was again picked as Per Mathias Høgmo's assistant, this time for the Norway men's national football team. The spell lasted until 2016. He continued as an adviser for young managers in the Football Association of Norway before retiring in 2018. In 2020 he was hired by Molde FK as a developer of youth team coaches.
