= Johanna Chamorro =

Argentine footballer

Personal information
- Full name: Johanna Fernanda Chamorro
- Date of birth: 27 April 1992 (age 34)
- Place of birth: San Martín, Buenos Aires, Argentina
- Height: 1.71 m (5 ft 7 1/2 in)
- Position: Midfielder

Team information
- Current team: Racing

Senior career*
| Years | Team | Apps | (Gls) |
| 2013–2015 | Huracán | | |
| 2016 | Taubaté | | |
| 2016 | Santa Cruz | | |
| 2017 | Sport | 10 | (2) |
| 2018– | Racing | | |

International career^{‡}
| 2012 | Argentina U20 | 1 | (0) |
| 2014 | Argentina | 1 | (0) |
- * Club domestic league appearances and goals as of 28 September 2014 ‡ National team caps and goals as of 31 May 2017

Johanna Fernanda Chamorro (born 27 April 1992) is an Argentine footballer who plays as a midfielder for Racing Club de Avellaneda. She was a member of the Argentina women's national team.

== International career ==
Chamorro represented Argentina at the 2012 FIFA U-20 Women's World Cup. She made her senior debut during the 2014 Copa América Femenina on 12 September that year in a 0–1 loss to Chile.
