= Jennifer Cramer =

German footballer

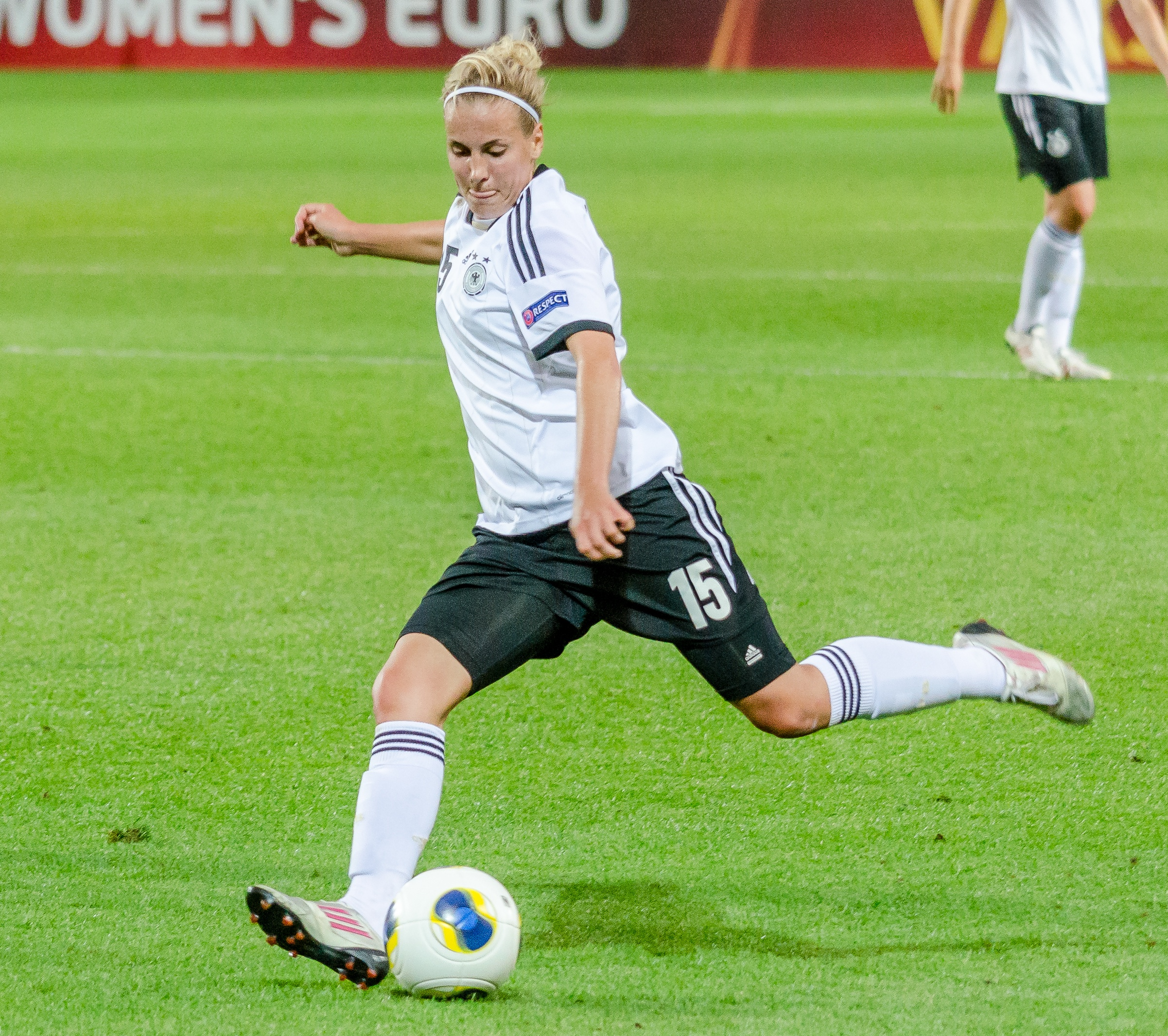
- Cramer playing for Germany in 2013

Personal information
- Full name: Jennifer Cramer
- Date of birth: 24 February 1993 (age 33)
- Place of birth: Frankenberg (Eder), Germany
- Height: 1.68 m (5 ft 6 in)
- Positions: Midfielder; full-back

Team information
- Current team: Hertha BSC
- Number: 24

Youth career
- 1998–2007: JSG Röddenau/Birkenbringhausen
- 2005–2008: DFC Allendorf/Eder
- 2008–2010: 1. FFC Turbine Potsdam

Senior career*
Years	Team	Apps	(Gls)
2009–2018	1. FFC Turbine Potsdam II	26	(1)
2010–2018	1. FFC Turbine Potsdam	94	(7)
2021	Pink Bari	4	(0)
2022–2025	1. FFC Turbine Potsdam	51	(0)
2025–	Hertha BSC	7	(0)

International career
2009–2010	Germany U-17	14	(1)
2011	Germany U-19	16	(1)
2012	Germany U-20	12	(2)
2013–2015	Germany	23	(0)
Medal record
Women's football
Representing Germany
UEFA Women's Championship
Gold medal – first place	2013 Sweden	Team
- * Club domestic league appearances and goals as of 28 May 2023

Jennifer Cramer (born 24 February 1993) is a German footballer. She plays for Hertha BSC in the Frauen-Regionalliga.

== Club career ==
In June 2017, she extended her contract with 1. FFC Turbine Potsdam.

== International career ==
She represented Germany at the 2015 FIFA Women's World Cup.

== Honours ==
1. FFC Turbine Potsdam

- UEFA Women's Champions League Runner-up: 2010–11
- Frauen-Bundesliga Winners: 2010–11, 2011–12
- DFB-Pokal Runners-up: 2010–11, 2012–13

Germany U17

- UEFA Women's U-17 Championship Winner: 2009

Germany U19

- UEFA Women's U-19 Championship Winner: 2011

Germany U20

- FIFA U-20 Women's World Cup Runner-up: 2012

Germany

- UEFA Women's Championship Winner: 2013
- Algarve Cup: Winner 2014
