= 2011 UEFA Women's Under-19 Championship =

Campionato europeo femminile Under-19 di calcio 2011

Tournament details
- Host country: Italy
- Dates: 30 May – 11 June
- Teams: 8

Final positions
- Champions: Germany (6th title)
- Runners-up: Norway

Tournament statistics
- Matches played: 15
- Goals scored: 54 (3.6 per match)
- Top scorer(s): (Norway) Melissa Bjånesøy (7 goals)
- Best player: (Germany) Ramona Petzelberger

The UEFA Women's U-19 Championship 2011 Final Tournament was held in Italy between 30 May and 11 June 2011. Players born after 1 January 1992 were eligible to participate in this competition.

As the final tournament took place in an odd year this tournament serves as the European qualifying tournament for the 2012 FIFA U-20 Women's World Cup.

Germany defeated Norway in the final 8–1 to win their sixth title.

== Tournament structure ==
	Teams entering in this round	Teams advancing from previous round	Competition format
First qualifying round (44 teams)	44 teams from associations ranked 2–53		11 groups of 4 teams, hosted by one club, seeded into four pots by UEFA coefficient
Second qualifying round (24 teams)	Germany (top-seed)	11 group winners and runners-up from 1st qualifying round; best group third-place finisher from 1st qualifying round	6 groups of 4 teams, hosted by one club, seeded into four pots by UEFA coefficient
Final tournament (8 teams)	Italy (hosts)	6 group winners from 2nd qualifying round; best group runners-up from 2nd qualifying round	2 groups of 4 teams, semi-finals, final

== Qualifications ==
There were two separate rounds of qualifications held before the Final Tournament.

=== First qualifying round ===
In the first qualifying round 44 teams were drawn into 11 groups. The top two of each group and the best third-place finisher, counting only matches against the top two in the group, advanced.

=== Second qualifying round ===
In the second round the 23 teams from the first qualifying round were joined by top seeds Germany. The 24 teams of this round were drawn into six groups of four teams. The group winners and the runners-up team with the best record against the sides first and third in their group advance to the final tournament.

== Cities & Stadiums ==
Città	Stadio
Imola	Stadio Romeo Galli
Bellaria – Igea Marina	Stadio Enrico Nanni
Cervia	Stadio Germano Todoli
Forlì	Stadio Tullo Morgagni

== Final tournament ==
The 7 teams advancing from the second qualifying round were joined by host nation Italy. The eight teams were drawn into two groups of four with the top two teams of each group advancing to the semi-finals. The draw was made on 14 April 2011.

=== Qualified teams ===
Italy were qualified as hosts. Belgium was best group runner-up in the second qualifying round. The other six teams won their groups.

- Italy
- Belgium
- Germany
- Netherlands
- Norway
- Russia
- Spain
- Switzerland

=== Group stage ===
The draw was held on 14 April 2011 at Cervia, Italy.

==== Group A ====
Team	Pld	W	D	L	GF	GA	GD	Pts
Italy	3	3	0	0	6	2	+4	9
Switzerland	3	1	1	1	4	2	+2	4
Russia	3	1	1	1	4	3	+1	4
Belgium	3	0	0	3	3	10	−7	0

30 May 2011
17:00

Italy	2–1	Russia
Coppola 3'; Alborghetti 53'	Report	Koltakova 13'

Stadio Romeo Galli, Imola
Referee: Sandra Braz Bastos (Portugal)

30 May 2011
17:00

Switzerland	4–1	Belgium
Aigbogun 23'; Saner 35'; Probst 89'; Fässler 90+3'	Report	Aga 58'

Stadio Enrico Nanni, Bellaria
Referee: Pernilla Larsson (Sweden)

2 June 2011
17:00

Italy	1–0	Switzerland
Coppola 84'	Report

Stadio Germano Todoli, Cervia
Referee: Lilach Asulin (Israel)

2 June 2011
17:00

Russia	3–1	Belgium
Cholovyaga 22', 62'; Ananyeva 64'	Report	Vanhaevermaet 36'

Stadio Tullo Morgagni, Forlì
Referee: Séverine Zinck (France)

5 June 2011
17:00

Belgium	1–3	Italy
Aga 30'	Report	Salvai 64'; Filippozzi 67'; Alborghetti 69'

Stadio Enrico Nanni, Bellaria
Referee: Lina Lehtovaara (Finland)

5 June 2011
17:00

Russia	0–0	Switzerland
	Report

Stadio Germano Todoli, Cervia
Referee: Pernilla Larsson (Sweden)

==== Group B ====
Team	Pld	W	D	L	GF	GA	GD	Pts
Germany	3	3	0	0	6	2	+4	9
Norway	3	2	0	1	9	4	+5	6
Netherlands	3	0	1	2	2	6	−4	1
Spain	3	0	1	2	2	7	−5	1

30 May 2011
17:00

Germany	3–1	Norway
Schmid 26'; Lotzen 45+1'; Hegenauer 90+3'	Report	Bjånesøy 35'

Stadio Germano Todoli, Cervia
Referee: Séverine Zinck (France)

30 May 2011
17:00

Spain	1–1	Netherlands
Beristain 11'	Report	Rijsdijk 49'

Stadio Tullo Morgagni, Forlì
Referee: Lina Lehtovaara (Finland)

2 June 2011
17:00

Germany	1–0	Spain
Beckmann 57'	Report

Stadio Enrico Nanni, Bellaria
Referee: Sandra Braz Bastos (Portugal)

2 June 2011
17:00

Norway	3–0	Netherlands
Bjånesøy 6' (pen.), 57'; Hegland 39'	Report

Stadio Romeo Galli, Imola
Referee: Morag Pirie (Scotland)

5 June 2011
17:00

Netherlands	1–2	Germany
van de Sanden 58'	Report	Lotzen 67'; Rudelic 90+1'

Stadio Romeo Galli, Imola
Referee: Lilach Asulin (Israel)

5 June 2011
17:00

Norway	5–1	Spain
Bjånesøy 7', 90'; An. Hegerberg 33'; Hegland 45+1'; Reiten 85'	Report	Knudsen 61' (o.g.)

Stadio Tullo Morgagni, Forlì
Referee: Morag Pirie (Scotland)

=== Knockout stage ===
Semi-finals
Italy	2
Norway	3
Germany	3
Switzerland	1

Final
Norway	1
Germany	8

==== Semifinals ====
8 June 2011
17:00

Italy	2–3	Norway
Lecce 22'; Coppola 49'	Report	Bjånesøy 12'; Hegerberg 48'; Hansen 65'

Stadio Enrico Nanni, Bellaria
Referee: Séverine Zinck (France)

8 June 2011
20:00

Germany	3–1	Switzerland
Petzelberger 20'; Beckmann 54'; Lotzen 84'	Report	Canetta 38'

Stadio Romeo Galli, Imola
Referee: Morag Pirie (Scotland)

==== Final ====
11 June 2011
20:30

Norway	1–8	Germany
Bjånesøy 72'	Report	Wensing 29'; Schmid 50', 79'; Lotzen 55', 60'; Petzelberger 58'; Rudelic 70'; Hegenauer 88'

Stadio Romeo Galli, Imola
Referee: Sandra Braz Bastos (Portugal)

Norway	Germany

NORWAY:
GK	1	Ane Fimreite
DF	2	Anja Sønstevold	(substituted off) 74'
DF	3	Ingrid Søndenå
DF	4	Maren Knudsen
FW	14	Ada Hegerberg	(substituted off) 46'
DF	6	Maria Thorisdottir
DF	7	Andrine Hegerberg
MF	8	Ina Skaug
FW	10	Melissa Bjånesøy
MF	13	Cathrine Dekkerhus	(substituted off) 70'
FW	11	Kristine Hegland (c)
Substitutes:
MF	9	Caroline Hansen	(substituted in) 46'
MF	11	Guro Reiten	(substituted in) 70'
DF	8	Ida Aardalen	(substituted in) 74'
Manager:
Jarl Torske

GERMANY:
GK	1	Lisa Schmitz
DF	5	Luisa Wensing
DF	4	Johanna Elsig
DF	16	Jennifer Cramer
DF	2	Leonie Maier
MF	6	Kathrin Hendrich	(substituted off) 64'
MF	8	Isabella Schmid
FW	7	Eunice Beckmann	(substituted off) 63'
FW	10	Ramona Petzelberger (c)
DF	3	Carolin Simon	(substituted off) 58'
MF	11	Lena Lotzen
Substitutes:
MF	17	Marie Pyko	(substituted in) 58'
FW	15	Ivana Rudelic	(substituted in) 63'
MF	18	Anja Hegenauer	(substituted in) 64'
Manager:
Maren Meinert

MATCH OFFICIALS

- Assistant referees:
  - Sian Massey (England)
  - Angela Kyriakou (Cyprus)
- Fourth official: Pernilla Larsson (Sweden)

== Awards ==
2011 UEFA Women's U-19 European champions

Germany
Sixth title

== Goal scorers ==
7 goals

- (Norway) Melissa Bjånesøy

5 goals

- (Germany) Lena Lotzen

3 goals

- (Germany) Isabella Schmid
- (Italy) Katia Coppola

2 goals

- (Belgium) Maria-Laura Aga
- (Germany) Eunice Beckmann
- (Germany) Anja Hegenauer
- (Germany) Ramona Petzelberger
- (Germany) Ivana Rudelic
- (Italy) Lisa Alborghetti
- (Norway) Kristine Hegland
- (Russia) Anna Cholovyaga

1 goal

- (Belgium) Justine Vanhaevermaet
- (Germany) Luisa Wensing
- (Italy) Roberta Filippozzi
- (Italy) Elisa Lecce
- (Italy) Cecilia Salvai
- (Netherlands) Pia Rijsdijk
- (Netherlands) Shanice van de Sanden
- (Norway) Ada Hegerberg
- (Norway) Andrine Hegerberg
- (Norway) Caroline Hansen
- (Norway) Guro Reiten
- (Russia) Tatiana Ananyeva
- (Russia) Nadezhda Koltakova
- (Spain) Naiara Beristain
- (Switzerland) Eseosa Aigbogun
- (Switzerland) Cora Canetta
- (Switzerland) Nadine Fässler
- (Switzerland) Michelle Probst
- (Switzerland) Corina Saner

own goal

- (Norway) Maren Knudsen (playing against Spain)
