= Bryane Heaberlin =

American soccer player

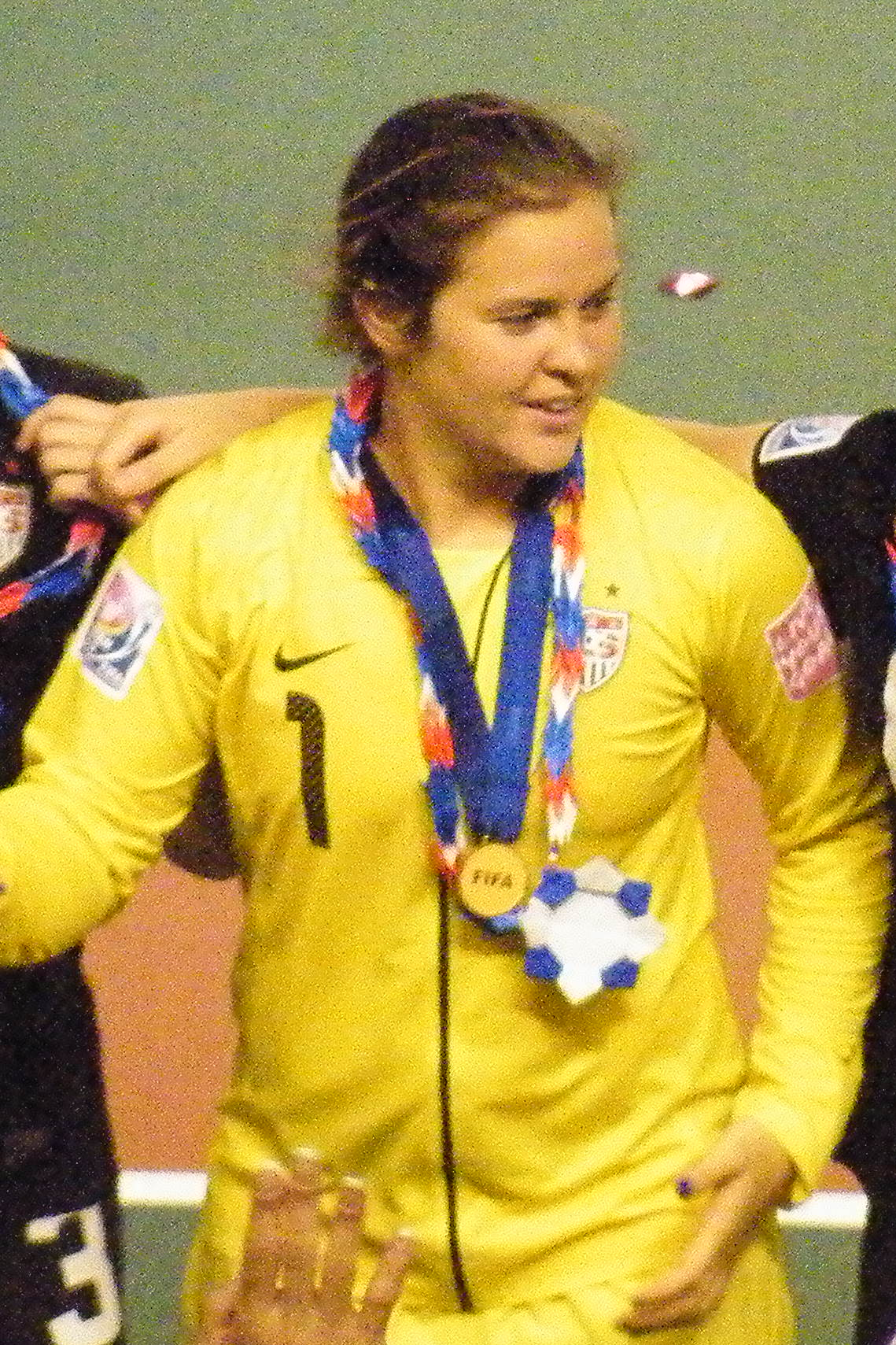
- Heaberlin in 2012

Personal information
- Full name: Bryane Somerton Heaberlin
- Date of birth: November 2, 1993 (age 32)
- Place of birth: St. Petersburg, Florida, United States
- Height: 5 ft 8 in (1.73 m)
- Position: Goalkeeper

Youth career
- 2002–2009: Chargers SC
- 2007–2008: Northeast Raiders SC
- 2009–2010: Berkeley Prep Buccaneers
- 2011: IMG Academy

College career
Years	Team	Apps	(Gls)
2012–2015	North Carolina Tar Heels		

Senior career*
Years	Team	Apps	(Gls)
2015–2017	Turbine Potsdam	5	(0)
2017–2021	Eintracht Frankfurt	58	(0)

International career^{‡}
2010–2012	United States U-20	16	(0)
- * Club domestic league appearances and goals as of 21:56, 18 December 2022 (UTC) ‡ National team caps and goals as of 21:56, 18 December 2022 (UTC)

Bryane Somerton Heaberlin (born November 2, 1993) is an American soccer goalkeeper who last played for Eintracht Frankfurt. She previously played for Turbine Potsdam. She has represented the United States on the under-20 national team and won gold with the team at the 2012 CONCACAF Women's U-20 Championship and 2012 FIFA U-20 Women's World Cup.

== Early life ==
Heaberlin started playing youth soccer in 2002 at the Chargers Soccer Club in Clearwater, Florida. From 2009 until 2010, she played for the Northeast Raiders.

== Club career ==
Heaberlin made 63 appearances for 1. FFC Frankfurt (Known as Eintracht Frankfurt from 2020) after joining from Turbine Potsdam in 2017. After suffering a concussion she agreed a mutual termination of her contract in March 2021 and returned to the United States.
