= Anja Sønstevold =

Norwegian footballer (born 1992)

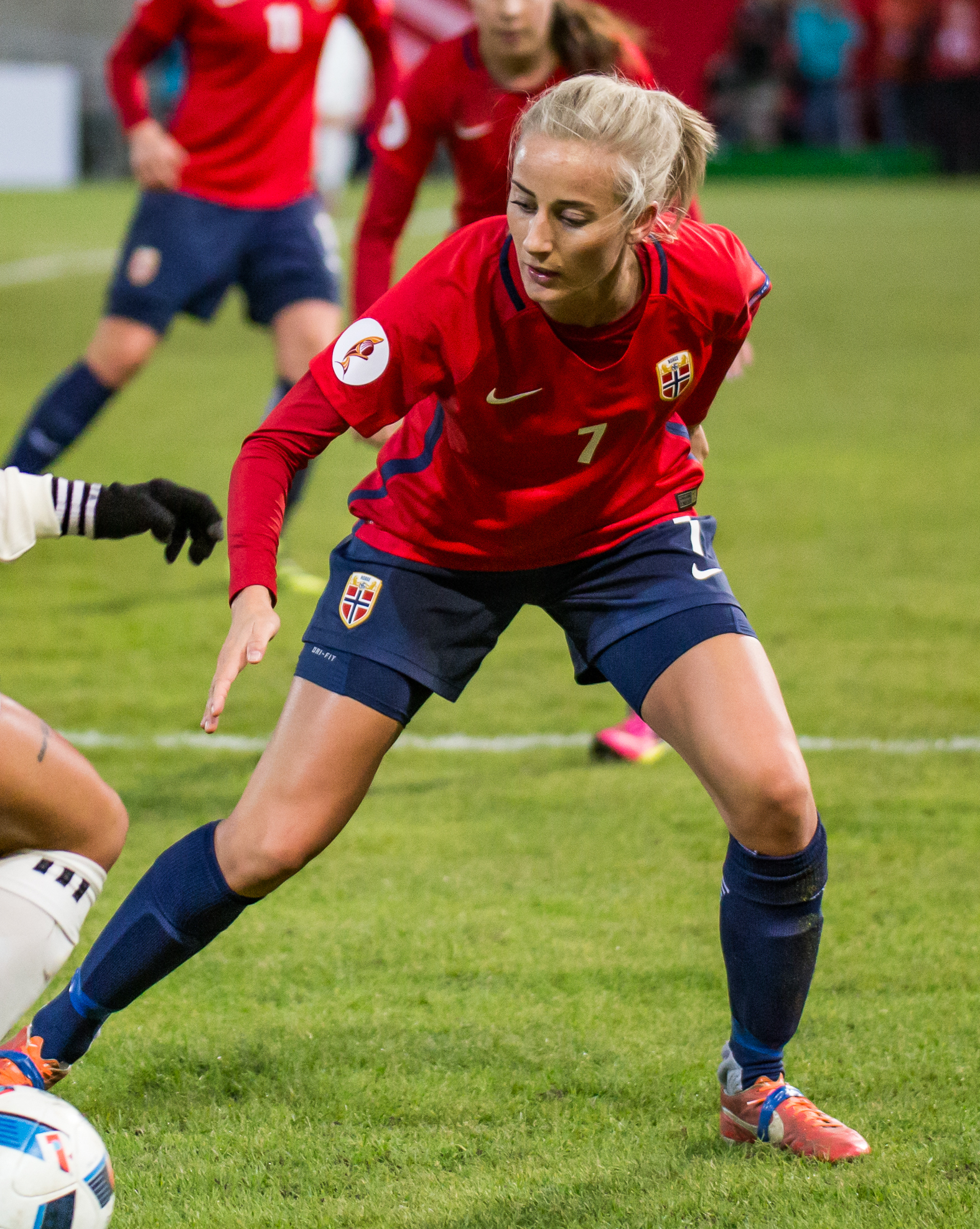
- Sønstevold playing for Norway in 2016

Personal information
- Full name: Anja Sønstevold
- Date of birth: 21 June 1992 (age 34)
- Place of birth: Oslo, Norway
- Height: 1.70 m (5 ft 7 in)
- Positions: Defender; midfielder

Youth career
- 2007: SF Grei
- 2008: Linderud-Grei

Senior career*
Years	Team	Apps	(Gls)
2009–2014	Kolbotn	105	(7)
2015–2019	LSK Kvinner	105	(11)
2020–2021	Fleury	7	(0)
2021–2023	Inter Milan	50	(2)
2024	AS Roma	13	(0)
Total		280	(20)

International career^{‡}
2007	Norway U15	1	(0)
2008	Norway U16	11	(1)
2009	Norway U17	6	(0)
2009–2011	Norway U19	27	(0)
2011–2012	Norway U20	9	(0)
2012–2019	Norway U23	14	(1)
2014–2024	Norway	28	(1)
- * Club domestic league appearances and goals as of 20:44, 22 October 2024 (UTC) ‡ National team caps and goals as of 9 July 2023

Anja Sønstevold (born 21 June 1992) is a Norwegian former professional footballer who played as a defender.

== Club career ==
Sønstevold played in her youth at SF Grei and Linderud/Grei. In 2010, she joined the Toppserien club Kolbotn, after being selected by her former coach Dan Eggen. During her time there, she played for 4 years, recording 113 top-flight appearances and scoring 10 goals. In 2015, she moved to the current league champions LSK Kvinner FK. In June 2020, Sønstevold left LSK Kvinner after playing 127 league matches and being the current captain of the team.

Sønstevold joined Fleury in 2020, but left in 2021 due to problems with sexual harassment, misconduct and a toxic culture at the club.

On 7 August 2021, Sønstevold was announced at Inter Milan. She made her league debut against Napoli on 28 August 2021. Sønstevold scored her first league goal against Hellas Verona on 14 November 2021, scoring in the 6th minute. On 30 March 2022, it was announced that she had signed a two-year contract extension with the club.

On 16 January 2024, Sønstevold was announced at Roma.

Sønstevold retired from football in 2024.

== International career ==
Sønstevold went through several Norwegian youth teams and participated with the U-17 team in the qualification and the finals of the 2009 UEFA Women's Under-17 Championship in Nyon, where Norway finish in the fourth place. A year later she was part of the team that played at 2010 UEFA Women's Under-17 Championship, but failed to reach the finals. In 2011, she was in the team that qualified and reached the final of the 2011 UEFA Women's Under-19 Championship, when the team finish second after a massive loss for Germany, 8:1. For reaching the semi-finals, the Norwegians had already qualified for the 2012 FIFA U-20 Women's World Cup in Japan. Sønstevold was part of the squad that played the tournament. Norway reached the quarter-finals, but again they were defeated by Germany, 4:0. On 14 January 2014, she got her first senior international cap against Spain in La Manga, Spain. One year later, she was called for the 2015 Algarve Cup.

On 23 April 2015 she was appointed to the provisional squad of 35 players for the 2015 FIFA Women's World Cup. She was initially dropped from the final squad on 14 May, but she was later called into the 23-player roster to replace Caroline Graham Hansen, who had to withdraw to an injury.

Sønstevold was part of the squad that was called up to the UEFA Women's Euro 2017.

Sønstevold scored her first international goal against Armenia on 30 November 2021, scoring in the 59th minute.

Sønstevold was part of the squad that was called up to the UEFA Women's Euro 2022.

On 19 June 2023, she was included in the 23-player Norwegian squad for the 2023 FIFA Women's World Cup.

== Career statistics ==
=== International ===
As of match played 2 September 2022

Appearances and goals by national team and year
National team	Year	Apps	Goals
Norway	2014	1	0
Norway	2015	2	0
Norway	2016	3	0
Norway	2017	7	0
Norway	2018	2	0
Norway	2019	0	0
Norway	2020	2	0
Norway	2021	1	1
Norway	2022	5	0
Total		23	1

Scores and results list Norway's goal tally first, score column indicates score after each Sønstevold goal.

List of international goals scored by Anja Sønstevold
No.	Date	Venue	Opponent	Score	Result	Competition
1	30 November 2021	Yerevan Football Academy Stadium, Yerevan, Armenia	Armenia	7–0	10–0	2023 FIFA Women's World Cup qualification
