= Lisa Alborghetti =

Italian footballer (born 1993)

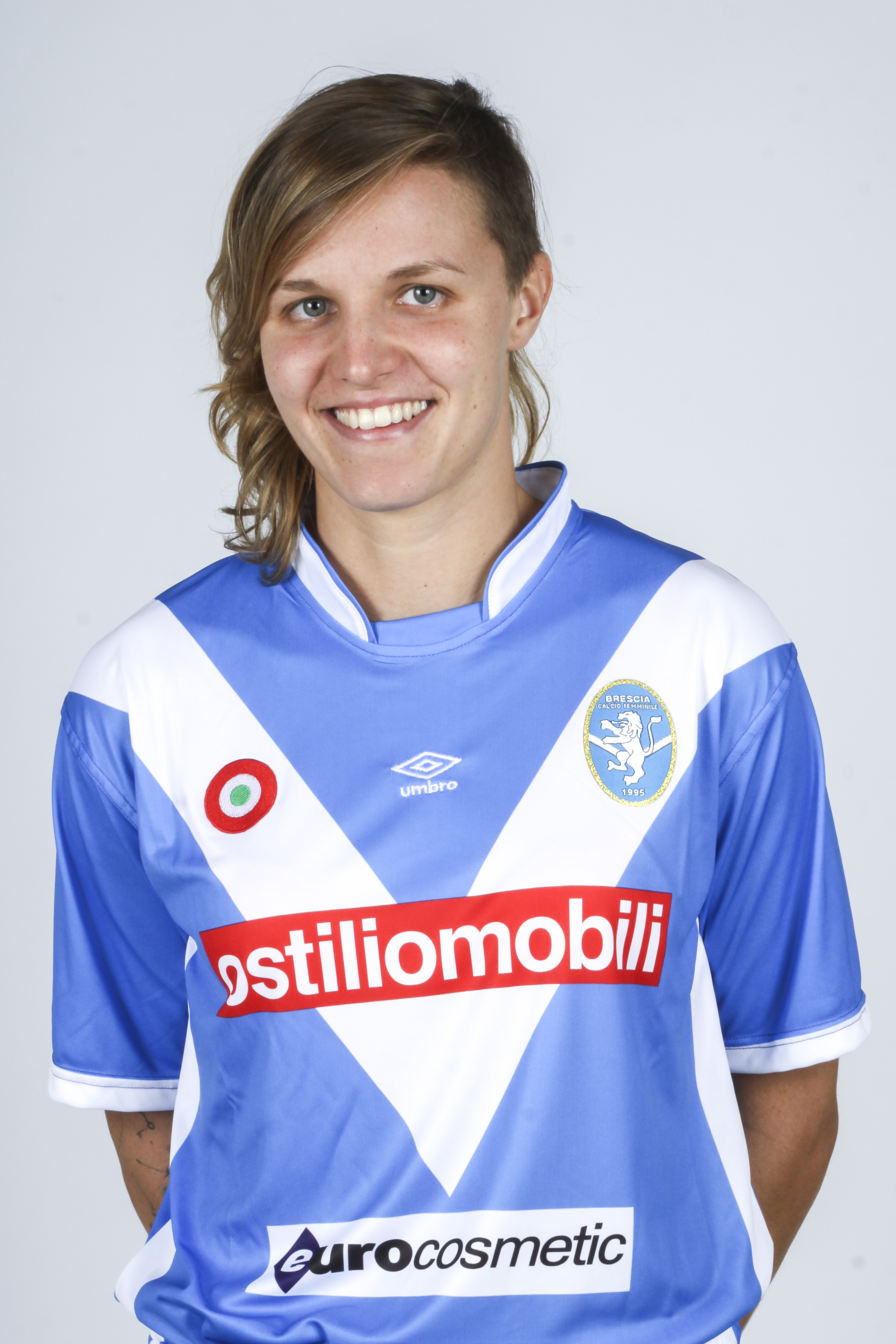

Personal information
- Full name: Lisa Alborghetti
- Date of birth: 19 June 1993 (age 33)
- Place of birth: Brescia, Italy
- Height: 1.72 m (5 ft 8 in)
- Position: Midfielder

Senior career*
Years	Team	Apps	(Gls)
2008–2016	ACF Brescia	149	(27)
2016–2017	Apollon Limassol	7	(0)
2017–2018	Atalanta Mozzanica	31	(16)
2018–2019	A.C. Milan	22	(4)
2019–2025	Inter Milan	87	(1)
Total		296	(48)

International career
2009	Italy U17	3	(2)
2011–2012	Italy U19	17	(10)
2013–2019	Italy	12	(0)
- * Club domestic league appearances and goals as of 15:11, 15 December 2025 (UTC)

Lisa Alborghetti (born 19 June 1993) is an Italian former professional footballer who played as a midfielder. She earned 12 caps for the Italy national team.

== Club career ==
Alborghetti started playing for ACF Brescia at the age of 15, when the team was playing in the second division (Serie B) in 2008. The club reached the Serie A for the first time in the 2009–10 season with Alborghetti scoring the club's first ever goal at the top division. With two Serie A titles, three Italian Women's Cup titles and three Italian Women's Super Cup titles, almost 200 matches played in all competitions in eight years with the club, it was announced on 30 June 2016 that she was joining Apollon Limassol of Cyprus.

In February 2017, She returned to Italy and played for Atalanta Mozzanica. She stayed there for one more season. In 2018–19 she played for newly founded team A.C. Milan Women.

Alborghetti retired from professional football at the end of the 2024–25 Serie A season.

== International career ==
Alborghetti has represented her country in the under-17 team and under-19 team, where she scored two goals in the 2011 UEFA Women's Under-19 Championship against Russia and Belgium.

She made her debut for the national team on 8 March 2013 against New Zealand.

== Honours ==
ACF Brescia

- Serie A: 2014, 2016
- Italian Cup: 2012, 2015, 2016
- Super Cup: 2014, 2015, 2016
