= Christine Exeter =

Canadian-born Jamaican footballer (born 1992)

Personal information
- Full name: Christine Exeter
- Date of birth: 3 September 1992 (age 34)
- Place of birth: Toronto, Ontario, Canada
- Height: 1.73 m (5 ft 8 in)
- Position: Forward

Youth career
- Pickering SC
- Ajax SC

College career
| Years | Team | Apps | (Gls) |
| 2010–2013 | Louisville Cardinals | 72 | (31) |

Senior career*
| Years | Team | Apps | (Gls) |
| 2010–2011 | Toronto Lady Lynx | | |
| 2022 | Darby FC | 14 | (8) |
| 2024– | Darby FC | 10 | (5) |

International career
| 2012 | Canada U20 | 7 | (1) |
| 2015– | Jamaica | 4 | |
- * Club domestic league appearances and goals as of August 2, 2024

Christine Exeter (born 3 September 1992) is a footballer who plays as a forward for Darby FC in League1 Ontario. Born in Canada, she represented Jamaica at senior international level.

== Early life ==
She began playing youth soccer at age 6 with Pickering SC. She later played youth soccer with Ajax SC. In 2004, at the age of 11, she was a recipient of the Bob Marley Award, which is given out to Jamaican-Canadians whose works have elevated the city of Toronto.

== College career ==
In 2010, she began attending the University of Louisville, where she played for the women's soccer team on a soccer scholarship. In 2010, she was named the Big East Rookie of the Year, after she led her team with seven goals. In 2011, she was named an NSCAA Third Team All-American, the Big East Conference Offensive Player of the Year, and a First Team All-Big East, helping the team clinch the program's first ever Big East National Division title. In 2012, she was named to the Third Team All-Big East and was a nominee for the Hermann Trophy.

== Club career ==
In 2010 and 2011, she played for the Toronto Lady Lynx in the USL W-League. She was named to the 2011 W-League All-Star team.

In 2022, she played for Darby FC in League1 Ontario. She was named a league Third Team All-Star in 2022.

== International career ==
Born in Canada, Exeter was also eligible to represent St. Vincent & the Grenadines, where her father was born, and Jamaica, where her mother was born.

In 2008, she was called up to a Canada U17 camp for the first time. She won a silver medal with the Canada U20 at the 2012 CONCACAF Women’s Under-20 Championship and also played at the 2012 FIFA U-20 Women’s World Cup. She scored her first international goal at the U20 World Cup on August 27 against North Korea U20.

In 2015, she switched to begin representing the Jamaica women's national football team. She was named team captain ahead of her third game.
