= Anja Hegenauer =

German footballer (born 1992)

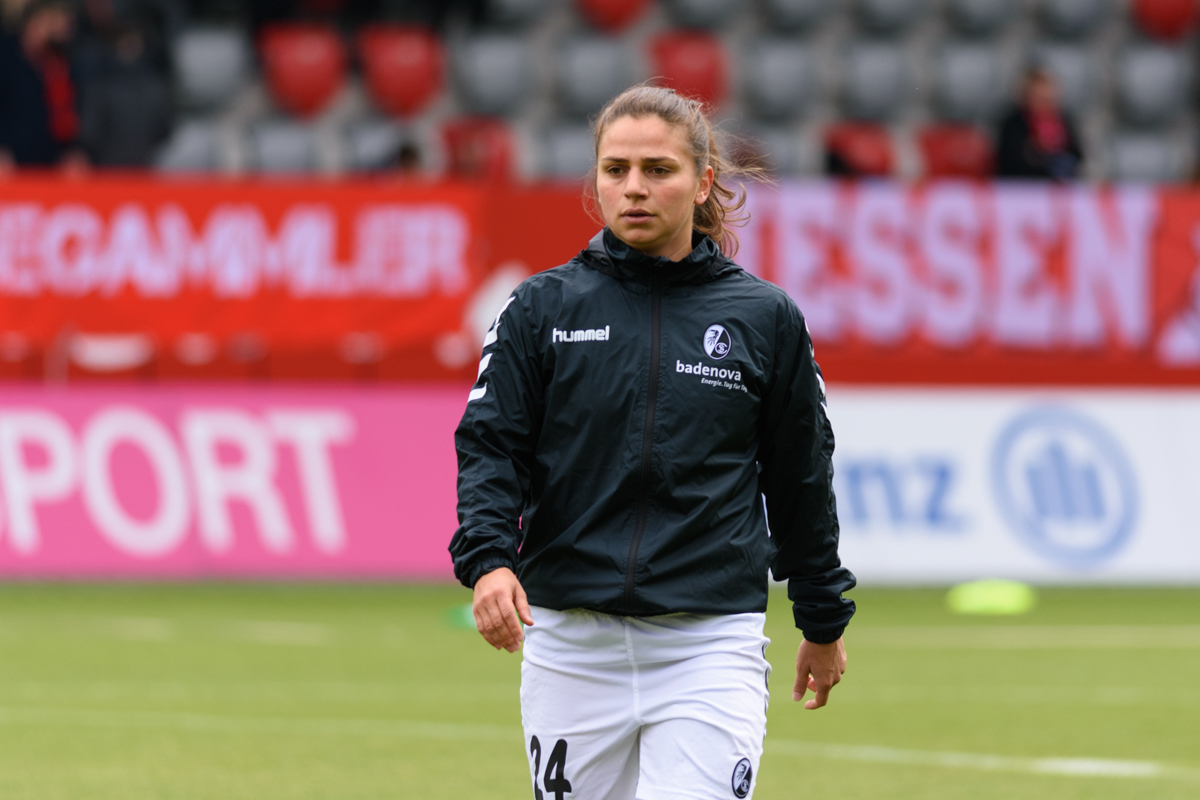
- Anja Maike Hegenauer during FC Bayern (women) SC Freiburg (women), May 2019

Personal information
- Full name: Anja Maike Hegenauer
- Date of birth: 9 December 1992 (age 33)
- Place of birth: Ulm, Germany
- Height: 1.69 m (5 ft 7 in)
- Position: Midfielder

Senior career*
Years	Team	Apps	(Gls)
2009–2020	Freiburg	164	(6)

International career
2011	Germany U19	6	(2)
2012	Germany U20	5	(1)
- * Club domestic league appearances and goals

Anja Maike Hegenauer is a former German football midfielder. As a junior international she won the 2011 U-19 European Championship. She studied at Albert Ludwig's University of Freiburg.

== Career ==
=== Clubs ===
Hegenauer started playing football at TSG Söflingen (Ulm) at the age of four, switched to VfL Munderkingen at the age of 14, and two years later to SC Freiburg. She made her Bundesliga debut on October 4, 2009 (3rd matchday) in the 0-2 defeat against 1. FFC Frankfurt; in the 82nd minute she was substituted for Selina Nowak. After being relegated to the 2nd Bundesliga South with Freiburg in 2010, they were promoted directly again in the 2010/11 season. On March 25, 2012 (16th matchday) she scored the first Bundesliga goal in a 3-0 home win against 1. FC Lokomotive Leipzig. With 220 competitive appearances and 11 years in the professional squad, she ranks among Freiburg's record appearance holders.

=== National team ===
From May 30 to June 11, 2011, she took part with the German team at the Under-19 European Championship in Italy and advanced to the final, which was won 8-1 against Norway. She made her debut in this national team on October 27, 2010 in Sollentuna/Sweden in a 1-1 draw against the hosts when she came on for Annika Doppler in the 71st minute. She scored her first international goal on May 11, 2011 in Bremerhaven with the goal to make it 5-0 over Russia. With the German under-20 national team, she took part in the 2012 World Cup in Japan and became vice world champion there after a 1-0 defeat in the final against the USA.

== Achievements ==
- Champion 2nd Bundesliga South and promotion to the Bundesliga 2011 (with SC Freiburg)
- DFB-Cup finalist 2019 (with SC Freiburg)
- U-19 European Champion 2011
- U-20 Vice World Champion 2012
