= Yushika Nakamura =

Japanese footballer

Personal information
- Date of birth: 21 August 1992 (age 34)
- Place of birth: Tokyo Prefecture, Japan
- Height: 1.56 m (5 ft 1 in)
- Position: Midfielder

Team information
- Current team: Chifure AS Elfen Saitama
- Number: 23

Senior career*
| Years | Team | Apps | (Gls) |
- Chifure AS Elfen Saitama
- * Club domestic league appearances and goals

Yushika Nakamura (born 21 August 1992) is a Japanese professional footballer who plays as a midfielder for WE League club Chifure AS Elfen Saitama.

== Club career ==
Nakamura made her WE League debut on 20 September 2021.
