= Osarenoma Igbinovia =

Nigerian footballer

Personal information
- Date of birth: 5 June 1996 (age 30)
- Position: Midfielder

Team information
- Current team: Bayelsa Queens

International career
Years	Team	Apps	(Gls)
- Nigeria

Osarenoma Igbinovia (born 5 June 1996) is a Nigerian footballer who plays for Bayelsa Queens in the Nigeria Women Premier League, and Nigeria women's national football team at national level.

== Career ==
At youth level, she represented Nigeria at the 2012 and 2014 FIFA U-20 Women's World Cup.

During the buildup to the 2016 Federation Cup semi final game against Delta Queens, Igbinovia described the training of her team as professional and tactical, explaining that a place in the final will be their quest in the game.

In April 2016, Igbinovia scored a decisive goal for Nigeria against Senegal that sealed her qualification to the 2016 Africa Women Cup of Nations. In the final group game at the tournament against Mali, Igbinovia played in the game, defeating the Malians, four goals to nil.

In May 2016, Igbinovia was nominated alongside Bayelsa Queens teammate, Rofiat Sule for the May edition of the Nigeria Women Premier League player of the month.

== Honours ==
- 2014 FIFA U-20 Women's World Cup - runners up.
