= Melissa Bjånesøy =

American-born Norwegian footballer (born 1992)

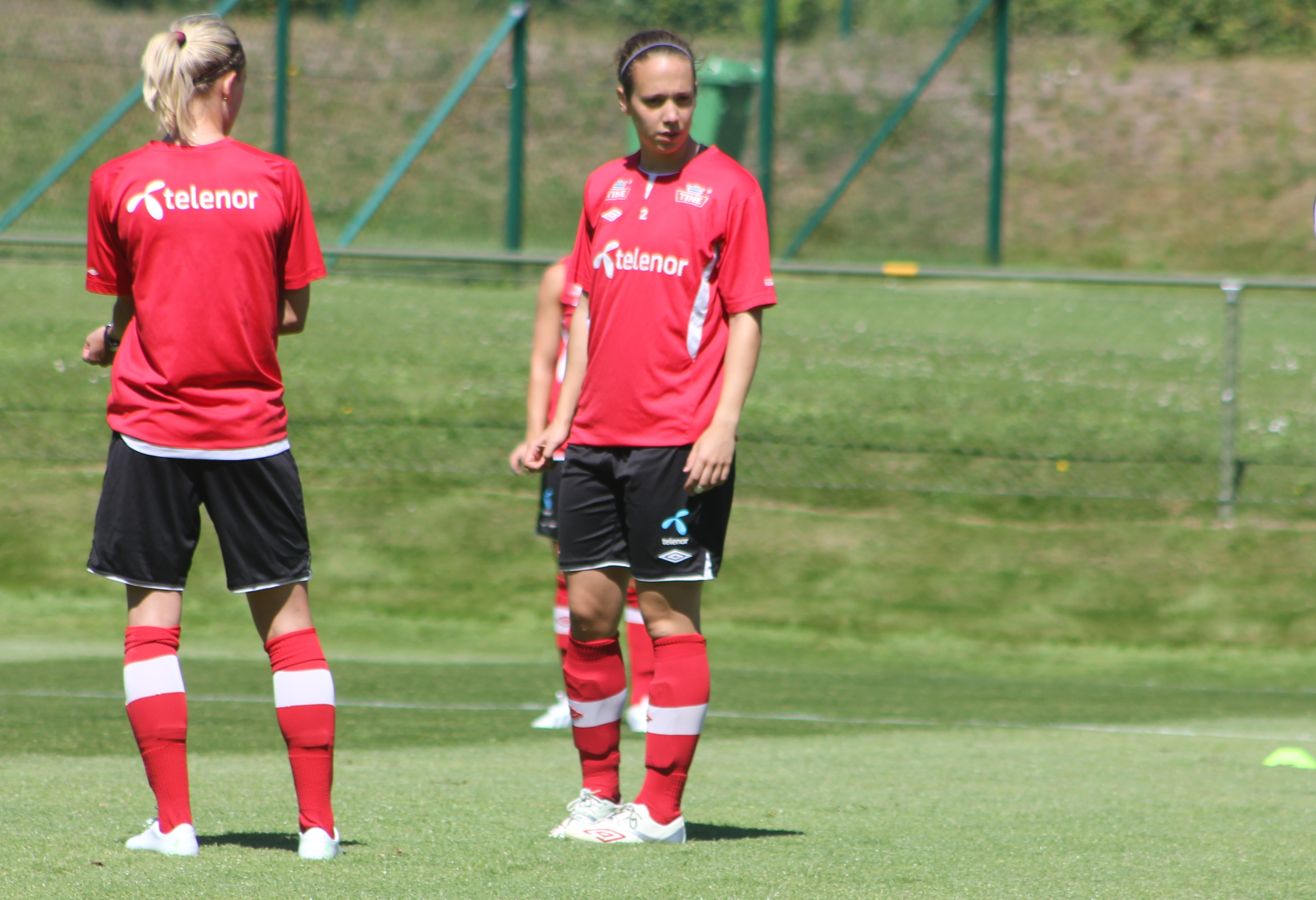

Personal information
- Full name: Melissa Linn Berman Bjånesøy
- Date of birth: 18 April 1992 (age 34)
- Place of birth: Chicago, Illinois, United States
- Height: 1.70 m (5 ft 7 in)
- Position: Striker

Senior career*
Years	Team	Apps	(Gls)
2009–2013	IL Sandviken	71	(31)
2014–2024	Stabæk	129	(73)

International career^{‡}
2010–2011	Norway U19	23	(28)
2012	Norway U20	6	(2)
2012–2015	Norway U23	1	(1)
2013–2015	Norway	21	(4)
Medal record
Women's football
Representing Norway
UEFA Women's Championship
Silver medal – second place	2013 Sweden	Team
- * Club domestic league appearances and goals as of 1 December 2020 ‡ National team caps and goals as of 2020

Melissa Linn Berman Bjånesøy (born 18 April 1992) is an American-born Norwegian former footballer who played as a striker. She previously played for IL Sandviken. In the 2011 season she scored ten goals to help Sandviken avoid relegation.

== Career ==
An Under-19 international, she was the top scorer of the 2011 U-19 European Championship with seven goals. She scored in all five games from the group stage to the final, which Norway lost 8–1 to Germany.

Veteran national coach Even Pellerud selected Bjånesøy in Norway's squad for UEFA Women's Euro 2013 in Sweden. In the final at Friends Arena, she was an unused substitute as Norway lost 1–0 to Germany.

== Career statistics ==
As of 1 December 2020

Club	Season	Division	League		Cup		Continental		Total	
Club	Season	Division	Apps	Goals	Apps	Goals	Apps	Goals	Apps	Goals
Sandviken	2009	Toppserien	9	1	0	0	-		9	1
Sandviken	2011	Toppserien	18	10	0	0	-		18	10
Sandviken	2012	Toppserien	22	13	3	1	-		25	14
Sandviken	2013	Toppserien	22	7	2	4	-		24	11
Sandviken	Total		71	31	5	5	-	-	76	36
Stabæk	2014	Toppserien	22	12	2	0	2	0	26	12
Stabæk	2015	Toppserien	19	6	4	0	-		23	6
Stabæk	2016	Toppserien	11	1	2	0	-		13	1
Stabæk	2017	Toppserien	21	11	3	1	-		24	12
Stabæk	2018	Toppserien	19	9	0	0	-		19	9
Stabæk	2019	Toppserien	20	9	1	1	-		21	10
Stabæk	2020	1. divisjon	17	25	2	1	-		19	26
Stabæk	Total		129	73	14	3	2	0	145	76
Career total			200	104	19	8	2	0	221	112

== International goals ==
No.	Date	Venue	Opponent	Score	Result	Competition
1.	14 January 2013	Yongchuan Sports Center, Chongqing, China	China	1–0	1–0	2013 Four Nations Tournament
2.	17 January 2014	La Manga Stadium, La Manga, Spain	England	1–1	1–1	Friendly
3.	13 February 2014	Komotini Municipal Stadium, Komotini, Greece	Greece	5–0	5–0	2015 FIFA Women's World Cup qualification
4.	11 March 2015	Estádio Municipal, Albufeira, Portugal	Denmark	5–1	5–2	2015 Algarve Cup
