= Ayu Nakada =

Japanese association footballer

Personal information
- Date of birth: August 15, 1993 (age 33)
- Place of birth: Yamanashi, Yamanashi Prefecture, Japan
- Height: 1.61 m (5 ft 3 in)
- Position: Midfielder

Team information
- Current team: Omiya Ardija Ventus
- Number: 13

Youth career
- 2009–2011: Tokiwagi Gakuen High School LSC

Senior career*
Years	Team	Apps	(Gls)
2012–2020	INAC Kobe Leonessa	99	(11)
2021–	Omiya Ardija Ventus	40	(2)

International career^{‡}
2010–2011	Japan U17	10	(1)
2012–2013	Japan U20	7	(0)
- * Club domestic league appearances and goals as of 18:50, 25 October 2023 (UTC) ‡ National team caps and goals as of 18:50, 25 October 2023 (UTC)

Ayu Nakada (仲田 歩夢; born August 15, 1993) is a Japanese professional football player who currently plays as a midfielder for Japanese WE League club Omiya Ardija Ventus. She played for Japan at the 2010 FIFA U-17 Women's World Cup and the 2012 FIFA U-20 Women's World Cup, winning silver at the former and bronze at the latter.

== Career ==
Influenced by her father, a football coach, Nakada started playing football at the age of 6. In elementary school she joined the strongest club in her prefecture, Fortuna SC. In junior high school, she competed for Japan at the U-15 level. At the U-17 level, she contributed to Japan's second place at the U-17 Women's World Cup, held in Trinidad at Tobago in 2010. She was a member of the Japanese team that won the bronze medal at the 2012 FIFA U-20 Women's World Cup.In the spring of 2012, at the age of 18, she joined INAC Kobe Leonessa.

== Outside football ==
For years Ayu Nakada has been a hot topic in Japan, attracting much attention for her looks (cuteness, idol-like/model-like appearance).

In 2014, she placed fifth in the survey "Which Japanese female soccer player would you want to date?". In 2016, she was selected to be the face of the poster promoting the Internet filtering rules for schools and other children's facilities, newly adopted in Hyogo Prefecture.

== Career statistics ==
=== Club ===
As of match played 1 October 2023

Club	Season	League			Empress's cup		League cup (Note: includes Nadeshiko League Cup, WE League Cup)		Total	
Club	Season	Division	Apps	Goals	Apps	Goals	Apps	Goals	Apps	Goals
INAC Kobe Leonessa	2012	Nadeshiko League	5	0	1	0	1	1	7	1
INAC Kobe Leonessa	2013	Nadeshiko League	3	1	0	0	1	0	4	1
INAC Kobe Leonessa	2014	Nadeshiko League	21	2	0	0	—		21	2
INAC Kobe Leonessa	2015	Nadeshiko League	8	1	1	1	—		9	2
INAC Kobe Leonessa	2016	Nadeshiko League	7	0	2	0	6	0	15	0
INAC Kobe Leonessa	2017	Nadeshiko League	15	1	2	2	9	2	26	5
INAC Kobe Leonessa	2018	Nadeshiko League	18	5	5	0	9	0	32	5
INAC Kobe Leonessa	2019	Nadeshiko League	13	0	2	0	8	3	23	3
INAC Kobe Leonessa	2020	Nadeshiko League	9	1	1	0	—		10	1
INAC Kobe Leonessa	Total		99	11	14	3	34	6	147	20
Omiya Ardija Ventus	2021–22	WE League	20	0	2	0	—		22	0
Omiya Ardija Ventus	2022–23	WE League	20	2	0	0	4	1	24	3
Omiya Ardija Ventus	2023–24	WE League	0	0	0	0	5	1	5	1
Omiya Ardija Ventus	Total		40	2	2	0	9	2	51	4
Career total			139	13	16	3	43	8	198	24

== Honours ==
=== Club ===
Tokiwagi Gakuen High School LSC

- All Japan High School Women's Soccer Tournament: 2009, 2011
- Challenge League East: 2010, 2011

INAC Kobe Leonessa

- Japan Women's Football League: 2012, 2013
- Empress's Cup All-Japan Women's Soccer Championship Tournament: 2012, 2013, 2015, 2016
- Nadeshiko League Cup: 2013
- Japan and South Korea Women's League Championship: 2012

=== International ===
Japan U19

- AFC U-19 Women's Championship: 2011

== Other appearances ==
=== Television ===
- Sports X (BS Asahi)
