= Evie Millynn =

New Zealand footballer

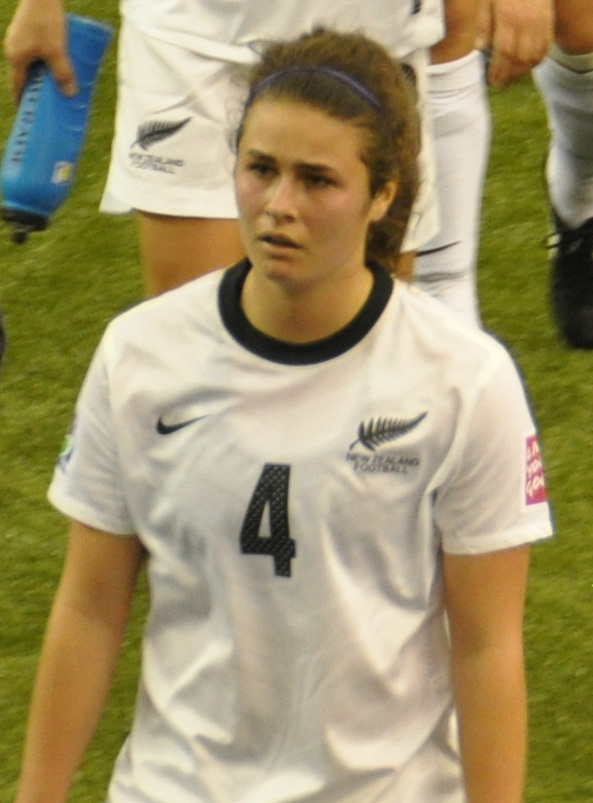
- Millynn at FIFA U-20 Women's World Cup

Personal information
- Full name: Evelyn Grace Millynn
- Date of birth: 23 November 1994 (age 31)
- Place of birth: Auckland, New Zealand
- Height: 1.58 m (5 ft 2 in)
- Position: Midfielder

Team information
- Current team: Eastern Suburbs AFC

International career^{‡}
Years	Team	Apps	(Gls)
2009–2010	New Zealand U17		
2011–2014	New Zealand U20		
2014–2015	New Zealand	2	(0)
- ‡ National team caps and goals as of 11:00, 16 June 2015 (UTC)

Evie Millynn (born 23 November 1994) is a New Zealand footballer who plays for Eastern Suburbs AFC as a midfielder.

== College career ==
In 2013, Millynn started studying at San Diego State University, taking part of the San Diego State Aztecs women's soccer team.

== International career ==
Millynn was part of New Zealand U17 roster who played in the 2010 FIFA U-17 Women's World Cup. She appeared in two matches. She was also a constant presence in the New Zealand U20 team. She was part of the roster in the 2012 FIFA U-20 Women's World Cup, where she played three matches and scored one goal. Millyn was also in the roster that represented New Zealand in the 2014 FIFA U-20 Women's World Cup, she played matches for her country. In 2015, she was called to the New Zealand 23-roster that played in the 2015 FIFA Women's World Cup but was an unused substitute.

== Personal ==
In March 2022 Millynn was diagnosed with COVID-19. In April 2022 Millynn permanently relocated to Melbourne, Australia. On October 15, 2023, Millynn completed the Nike Melbourne Marathon, crossing the line with a time of 4:14:23, a valiant effort.

== Philanthropy ==
Evie, with the help of friends and family, raised over $4,000 for the New Zealand Leukaemia and Blood Cancer Foundation during the lead up to the Melbourne Marathon.
