= Katia Coppola =

Italian football striker

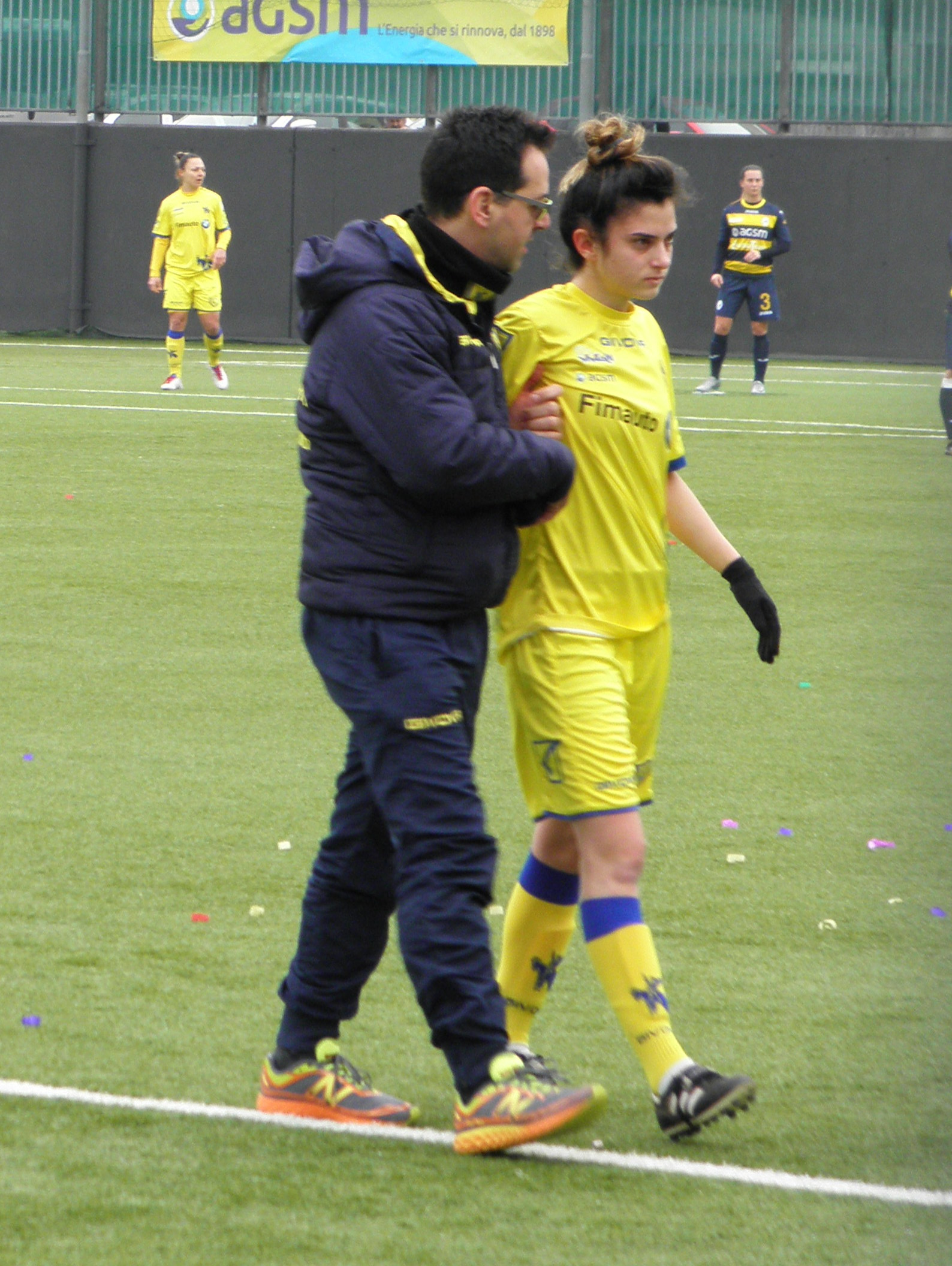
- Katia Coppola in 2018

Personal information
- Full name: Katia Coppola
- Date of birth: 5 May 1993 (age 33)
- Place of birth: Como, Italy
- Height: 1.61 m (5 ft 3 in)
- Position: Striker

Senior career*
Years	Team	Apps	(Gls)
2009–2012	FCF Como	74	(42)
2012-2014	FF Lugano 1976		
2014-2015	Inter Milan (women)	21	(15)
2015-2016	Milan Ladies	22	(25)
2016	ASD Cuneo Calcio Femminile	6	(0)
2016-2017	FCF Como	11	(6)
2017-2018	ChievoVerona Valpo	17	(4)

International career^{‡}
2010	Italia U-17		
2011	Italia U-19		
2012	Italia U-20	3	(0)
- * Club domestic league appearances and goals as of 2 July 2018 ‡ National team caps and goals as of 2 July 2018

Katia Coppola is an Italian football striker, currently playing for FCF Como in Italy's Serie A.

An Under-19 international, she was Italy's top scorer in the 2011 U-19 European Championship with 3 goals.
