= Hanae Shibata =

Japanese footballer

Hanae Shibata 柴田 華絵
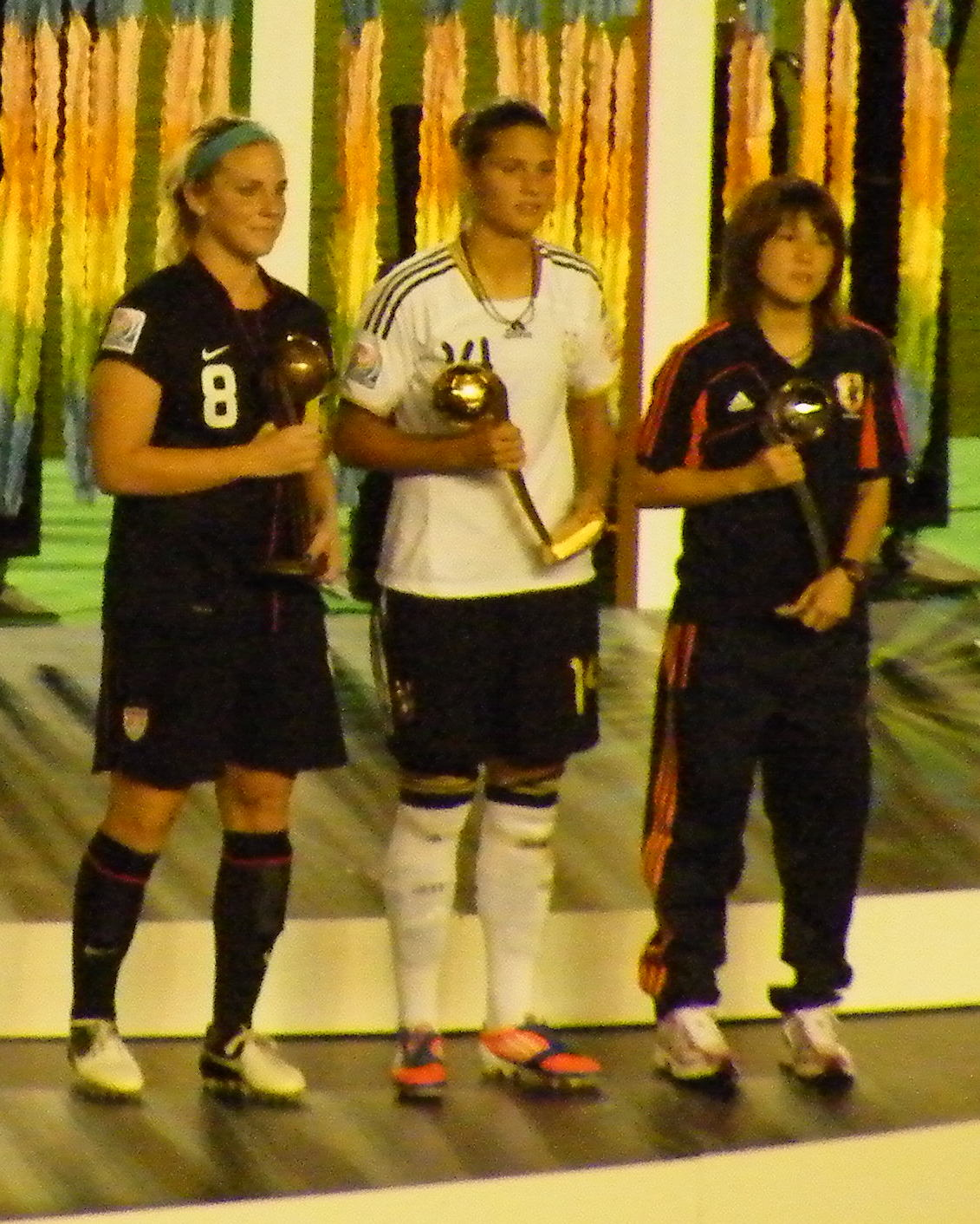
- 2012 U-20 World Cup Awards Ceremony (right)

Personal information
- Full name: Hanae Shibata
- Date of birth: July 27, 1992 (age 34)
- Place of birth: Kitakyushu, Fukuoka, Japan
- Height: 1.55 m (5 ft 1 in)
- Position: Midfielder

Team information
- Current team: Urawa Reds
- Number: 18

Youth career
- 2008–2010: Kamimura Gakuen High School

Senior career*
Years	Team	Apps	(Gls)
2011–	Urawa Reds	148	(11)
Total		148	(11)

International career
2012	Japan U-20	6	(3)
2015	Japan	1	(0)
Medal record
Urawa Reds
Winner	Nadeshiko League	2014
Runner-up	Nadeshiko League Cup	2017
Runner-up	Empress's Cup	2014
Representing Japan
FIFA U-20 Women's World Cup
Bronze medal – third place	2012 Japan
AFC U-19 Women's Championship
Gold medal – first place	2011 Vietnam
- * Club domestic league appearances and goals as of December 31, 2018

Hanae Shibata (柴田 華絵, Shibata Hanae; born July 27, 1992) is a Japanese football player. She plays for Urawa Reds in the WE League. She has also played for the Japan national team.

== Club career ==
Shibata was born in Kitakyushu on July 27, 1992. After graduating from high school, she joined Urawa Reds in 2011. She was selected for the Best Eleven in the 2015 season.

== National team career ==
In August 2012, Shibata was selected Japan U-20 national team for 2012 U-20 World Cup. She played 6 games and scored 3 goals, and Japan won 3rd place. Shibata was named the 2012 Asian Young Footballer of the Year. In August 2015, she was selected Japan national team for 2015 East Asian Cup. At this competition, on August 4, she debuted against South Korea.

== National team statistics ==
Japan national team
Year	Apps	Goals
2015	1	0
Total	1	0
