= Andrine Hegerberg =

Norwegian footballer (born 1993)

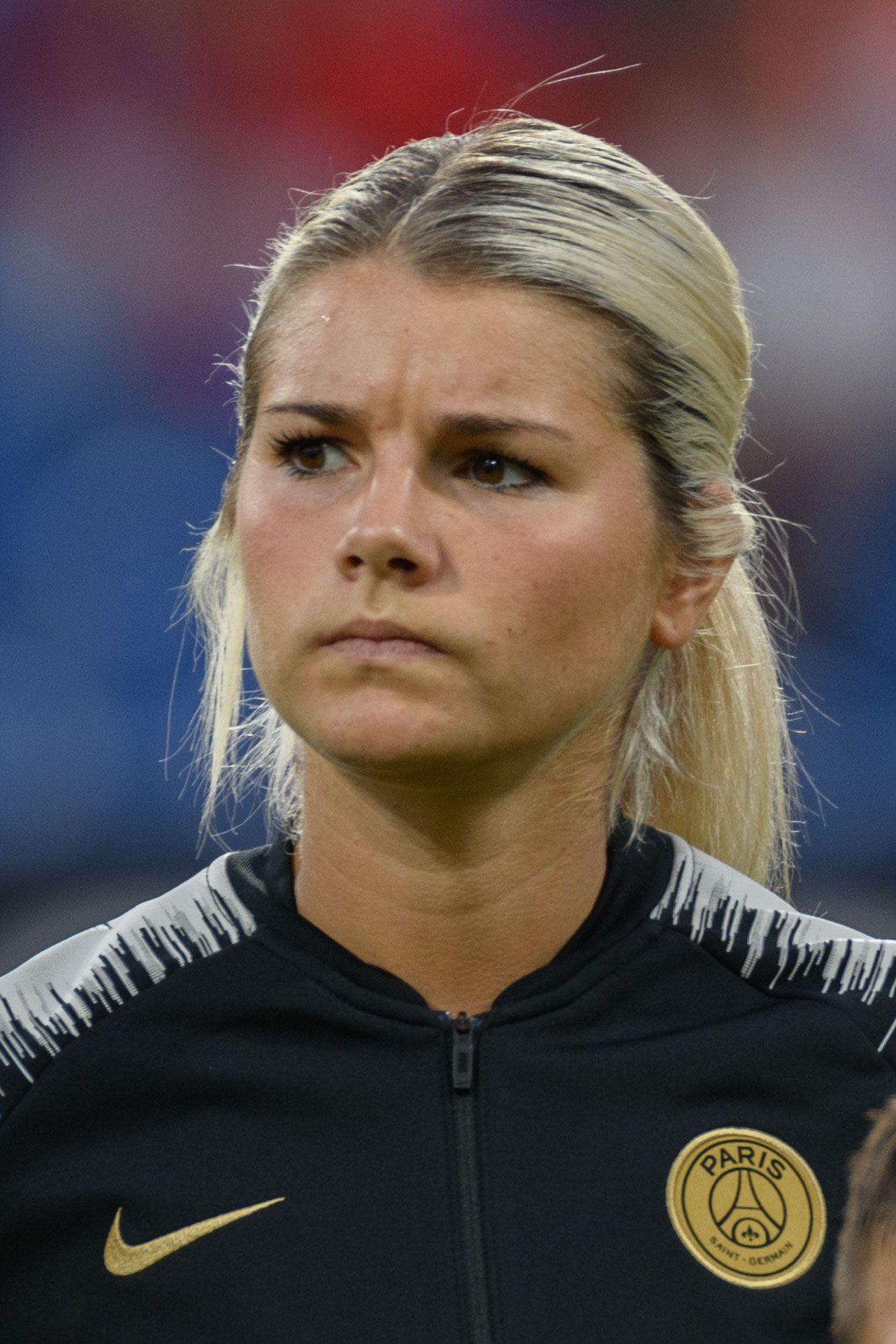
- Hegerberg with Paris Saint-Germain in 2018

Personal information
- Full name: Andrine Stolsmo Hegerberg
- Date of birth: 6 June 1993 (age 33)
- Place of birth: Sunndalsøra, Norway
- Height: 1.69 m (5 ft 7 in)
- Position: Midfielder

Youth career
- Sunndal
- 2007–2008: Kolbotn

Senior career*
Years	Team	Apps	(Gls)
2009–2011	Kolbotn	38	(10)
2012	Stabæk	21	(4)
2013	1. FFC Turbine Potsdam	4	(0)
2013–2016	Kopparbergs/Göteborg FC	59	(3)
2016–2018	Birmingham City	19	(0)
2018–2019	Paris Saint-Germain	9	(0)
2019–2021	Roma	24	(4)
2022	BK Häcken	20	(2)
2023–2024	SK Brann	24	(0)

International career
2007–2008	Norway U15	5	(1)
2008–2009	Norway U16	18	(4)
2008–2010	Norway U17	11	(0)
2010–2011	Norway U19	18	(3)
2011–2012	Norway U20	8	(3)
2012–2016	Norway U23	17	(5)
2012–2017	Norway	25	(1)
- * Club domestic league appearances and goals as of 23 September 2024

Andrine Stolsmo Hegerberg (born 6 June 1993) is a retired Norwegian footballer who played as a midfielder.

== Club career ==
Hegerberg was raised in Sunndal Municipality and played for Sunndal Fotball together with her younger sister Ada. In 2007, their family moved to Kolbotn, where the sisters joined the youth-ranks of Kolbotn IL. Ahead of the 2009 season, the 16-year-old Hegerberg was promoted to the first-team squad and signed a professional contract with Kolbotn, and subsequently made her debut in the Toppserien on 27 September 2009 during a 2–1 win against Fløya. The sisters were early considered as two of the most talented footballers in Norway, and in July 2011 Andrine won the Statoil Talent of the Month award. After three years with Kolbotn, where she won bronze in Toppserien in 2010 and 2011, she and Ada signed with Stabæk ahead of the 2012 season. With Stabæk, Hegerberg won the silver medal in the Toppserien and won gold at the Norwegian Cup.

In January 2013, Hegerberg moved with her sister to 1. FFC Turbine Potsdam, where she made her debut in the semifinal of the 2012–13 Frauen DFB-Pokal against Bayern Munich on 3 March 2013. She made her Bundesliga debut on 24 March 2013 in a 3–0 win against SC 07 Bad Neuenahr. Hegerberg made a total of four appearances for Potsdam, when the team finished second behind VfL Wolfsburg in both the league and the cup.

During the summer of 2013, Hegerberg signed with Swedish side Kopparbergs/Göteborg FC in the Damallsvenskan. She announced the move on her public Facebook profile, stating that she was no longer prepared to play for veteran coach Bernd Schröder. Turbine's players issued an open letter in response, which expressed disappointment at the manner of Hegerberg's departure. She made her debut for Göteborg during the team's 0–5 defeat to LdB Malmö on 18 August.

She signed for FA WSL club Birmingham City L.F.C. on 15 June 2016.

It was announced in January 2018, that Hegerberg was joining Paris Saint-Germain ("PSG") in Division 1 Féminine on a transfer from Birmingham. She stayed with PSG until 2019. In May 2019, it was announced Hegerberg had mutually agreed to leave PSG at the end of her contract and had already started negotiating with other teams.

In July 2019, Hegerberg signed with Italian Serie A team Roma. She cited her childhood passion for the Roma club colours and club icon Francesco Totti as her motivations for joining the club. Hegerberg made her Roma debut on 15 September 2019 in a 3–0 loss to AC Milan. She then scored her first goal for the club just one week later, in a 2–0 victory over Fiorentina.

Hegerberg went on to score four league goals from midfield for Roma in the 2019-20 Serie A season, as well as scoring in the Coppa Italia against Pink Bari. Despite her great start in Rome, the following year saw Hegerberg's second season in Rome cut short as she suffered a major knee injury during a January 2021 training session. Nonetheless, Hegerberg did pick up a Coppa Italia winner's medal in May 2021 after her club defeated AC Milan on penalties in the final.

== International career ==
Hegerberg has represented Norway at various junior levels of the Norwegian Football Association. In 2009, she was part of the Norwegian team that finished fourth during the finals of the U-17 European Championship in Nyon. Two years later, the team reached the final match of the 2011 UEFA Women's U-19 Championship in Italy, where they were defeated 1–8 by Germany. Hegerberg was also a part of the Norwegian team in the 2012 FIFA U-20 Women's World Cup, where she and her sister scored one goal each when Canada was beaten 2–1 and the Norwegian team advanced to the quarterfinal. On 17 January 2012, Hegerberg made her first appearance for the senior national team during a friendly match against Sweden. She scored her first senior international goal on 15 September 2016 again Kazakhstan.

== Playing style ==
Andrine Hegerberg is a box-to-box midfielder who contributes to her team's play with her movement off the ball. She can be relied upon to come inside her own defensive half of the pitch and join in the build-up play, as well as time her runs into the opponent's half and penalty area to help her team's offensive threat. This skill also makes Hegerberg a regular goalscoring threat in the box herself.

== Career statistics ==
=== International ===
As of match played 20 July 2017

Appearances and goals by national team and year
National team	Year	Apps	Goals
Norway
Norway	2012	1	0
Norway	2013	1	0
Norway	2014	3	0
Norway	2015	6	0
Norway	2016	6	1
Norway	2017	8	0
Total		25	1

Scores and results list Norway's goal tally first, score column indicates score after each Hegerberg goal.

List of international goals scored by Andrine Hegerberg
No.	Date	Venue	Opponent	Score	Result	Competition
1	15 September 2016	Aker Stadion, Molde, Norway	Kazakhstan	10–0	10–0	2017 UEFA Women's Euro qualification

== Honours ==
=== Club ===
Stabæk

- Norwegian Women's Cup: 2012
- Toppserien: Runner-up, 2012

1. FFC Turbine Potsdam

- Frauen Bundesliga: Runner-up, 2012–13
- Frauen DFB Pokal: Runner-up, 2012–13

Roma

- Coppa Italia: Winner, 2020–21

=== Country ===
Norway U-19

- 2011 UEFA Women's U-19 Championship: Runners-up, 2011
