= Lin Yuping =

Chinese association football player

Personal information
- Full name: Lin Yuping
- Date of birth: 28 February 1992 (age 34)
- Height: 1.78 m (5 ft 10 in)
- Position: Defender

Senior career*
Years	Team	Apps	(Gls)
-2017	Bayi		
2017-2019	Wuhan Jianghan University	0	(0)
2020	Bayi	0	(0)
2021-2023	Guangdong	17	(2)

International career
2012	China U20	3	(0)
2018–	China	17	(0)
Medal record
Women's football
Representing China
Asian Games
Silver medal – second place	2018 Palembang	Team
- * Club domestic league appearances and goals as of 25 June 2019

Lin Yuping (Chinese: 林宇萍; born 28 February 1992) is a Chinese footballer who plays as a defender.

== Career statistics ==
=== International ===
As of matches played 7 June 2019.

National team	Year	Apps	Goals
China	2018	5	0
China	2019	4	0
Total		9	0

== Honours ==
China

- Asian Games silver medalist: 2018
