= 2012 FIFA U-20 Women's World Cup =

2012 FIFA U-20女子ワールドカップ

Tournament details
- Host country: Japan
- Dates: 19 August – 8 September
- Teams: 16 (from 6 confederations)
- Venues: 5 (in 5 host cities)

Final positions
- Champions: United States (3rd title)
- Runners-up: Germany
- Third place: Japan
- Fourth place: Nigeria

Tournament statistics
- Matches played: 32
- Goals scored: 104 (3.25 per match)
- Attendance: 307,348 (9,605 per match)
- Top scorer: (North Korea) Kim Un-hwa (7 goals)
- Best player: (Germany) Dzsenifer Marozsán
- Best goalkeeper: (Germany) Laura Benkarth
- Fair play award: Japan

The 2012 FIFA U-20 Women's World Cup was the 6th edition of the tournament. The tournament was played in Japan from 19 August to 8 September with sixteen national football teams and marked the first hosting of a FIFA women's tournament in the country.

The host nation was to be decided on 19 March 2010 but was postponed by FIFA to give bidders more time to prepare their bids.

On 3 March 2011, FIFA initially awarded the World Cup to Uzbekistan. However, on 18 December 2011 FIFA had the tournament stripped from this country for problems with the bid and named Japan as a possible host. Japan was officially announced as host on 8 February 2012.

== Bids and hosting problems ==
Vietnam had originally won the right the host the tournament. However, the country had to withdraw its bid because it could not guarantee government backing and found the FIFA bid process "taxing".

New Zealand had initially been asked to be ready as a backup venue, but was eventually awarded the 2015 FIFA U-20 Men's World Cup and FIFA then awarded the hosting rights to Uzbekistan. However, in its meeting in Tokyo in December 2011, FIFA's Executive Committee decided to cancel Uzbekistan's hosting of the tournament due to "a number of logistical and technical issues" and announced that Japan had been proposed as its new organiser.

The Uzbekistan Football Federation had recommended six cities to host the matches. They were Tashkent, Samarkand, Bukhara, Qarshi, Mubarek and Guzar. The competition would have taken place in Tashkent's Pakhtakor and Bunyodkor Stadiums, Samarkand's Olympic Stadium, Bukhara's Markaziy Stadium, Qarshi's Nasaf Stadium, Mubarek's Bahrom Vafoev Stadium and the Guzar Stadium.

== Host cities and venues ==
On 31 March 2012, FIFA announced five stadiums for the tournament. Miyagi Stadium was the only stadium previously used for a FIFA tournament, one of ten Japanese venues for the 2002 FIFA World Cup.

Rifu	Saitama	Tokyo	Kobe	Hiroshima
Miyagi Stadium	Urawa Komaba Stadium	Japan National Stadium	Kobe Universiade Memorial Stadium	Hiroshima Big Arch
Capacity: 49,133	Capacity: 21,500	Capacity: 48,000	Capacity: 45,000	Capacity: 50,000
38.335378°N 140.950567°E	35.871475°N 139.665947°E	35.678084°N 139.714937°E	34.682375°N 135.080348°E	34.440779°N 132.394281°E
2012 FIFA U-20 Women's World Cup is located in Japan

== Qualified teams ==
Confederation (Continent)	Qualifying Tournament	Qualifier(s)
AFC (Asia)	Host nation	~~Vietnam~~; ~~Uzbekistan~~; Japan
AFC (Asia)	2011 AFC U-19 Women's Championship	North Korea; China; South Korea
CAF (Africa)	2012 African U-20 Women's World Cup Qualifying Tournament	Ghana; Nigeria
CONCACAF (North, Central America & Caribbean)	2012 CONCACAF Under-20 Women's Championship	United States; Canada; Mexico
CONMEBOL (South America)	2012 South American Under-20 Women's Football Championship	Brazil; Argentina
OFC (Oceania)	2012 OFC Women's U-20 Championship	New Zealand
UEFA (Europe)	2011 UEFA Women's Under-19 Championship	Germany; Norway; Switzerland; Italy

Notes

1. Withdrew its rights as host country.
2. Rights canceled as host country.
3. South Korea qualified because Japan was named the host nation.

== Squads ==
Each team submitted a squad of 21 players, including three goalkeepers. The squads were announced on 10 August 2012.

== Match officials ==
A total of 14 referees and 28 assistant referees were appointed by FIFA for the tournament.

Confederation	Referees	Assistant referees
AFC	(Singapore) Abirami Apbai Naidu (China) Qin Liang (Japan) Nami Sato (Japan) Fusako Kajiyama	(Singapore) Rohaidah Mohamed Nasir (Japan) Emi Chiba (China) Cui Yongmei (China) Fang Yan (Vietnam) Thi Thuy Kieu (South Korea) Lee Seul-gi (Japan) Saori Takahashi (Thailand) Praphaiphit Tarik
CAF	(Senegal) Fadouma Dia	(Togo) Mana Ayawa Dzodope (Morocco) Souad Oulhaj
CONCACAF	(United States) Margaret Domka (Guyana) Dianne Ferreira-James (Mexico) Lucila Venegas	(El Salvador) Emperatriz Ayala (Mexico) Enedina Caudillo (Mexico) Lixy Enríquez (Guatemala) Flor Escobar (Costa Rica) Kimberly Moreira (El Salvador) Patricia Pacheco
CONMEBOL	(Brazil) Ana Marques	(Argentina) Mariana de Almeida (Venezuela) Yoly García
UEFA	(Romania) Teodora Albon (Germany) Christine Baitinger (Beck) (Sweden) Pernilla Larsson (Italy) Silvia Spinelli (Switzerland) Esther Staubli	(England) Natalie Aspinall (Walker) (Switzerland) Eveline Bolli (Belgium) Ella De Vries (Romania) Petruța Iugulescu (Cyprus) Angela Kyriakou (England) Sian Massey (France) Manuela Nicolosi (Croatia) Sanja Rođak-Karšić (Slovakia) Mária Súkeníková (Lisická) (France) Karine Vives Solana

== Final draw ==
The final draw was held on 4 June 2012 in Tokyo. Teams were placed in four pots:

- Pot 1: Hosts and continental champions of the AFC, CONCACAF and CONMEBOL
- Pot 2: Remaining teams from AFC and CONCACAF
- Pot 3: Teams from UEFA
- Pot 4: Teams from CAF, OFC and remaining team from CONMEBOL

Pot 1	Pot 2	Pot 3	Pot 4
Japan (A1); North Korea; Brazil; United States	China; South Korea; Canada; Mexico	Germany; Italy; Norway; Switzerland	Ghana; Nigeria; Argentina; New Zealand

== Group stage ==
The ranking of each team in each group will be determined as follows:

1. greatest number of points obtained in all group matches
2. goal difference in all group matches
3. greatest number of goals scored in all group matches

If two or more teams are equal on the basis of the above three criteria, their rankings will be determined as follows:

1. greatest number of points obtained in the group matches between the teams concerned
2. goal difference resulting from the group matches between the teams concerned
3. greatest number of goals scored in all group matches between the teams concerned
4. drawing of lots by the FIFA Organising Committee

The two teams finishing first and second in each group qualify for the quarter-finals.

All times are Japanese Standard Time (UTC+9).

=== Group A ===
Team	Pld	W	D	L	GF	GA	GD	Pts
Japan	3	2	1	0	10	3	+7	7
Mexico	3	2	0	1	7	4	+3	6
New Zealand	3	1	1	1	4	7	−3	4
Switzerland	3	0	0	3	1	8	−7	0

19 August 2012
16:20

New Zealand	2–1	Switzerland
Millynn 39'; White 52'	Report	Aigbogun 90+1'

Miyagi Stadium, Rifu
Attendance: 9,542
Referee: Abirami Apbai (Singapore)

19 August 2012
19:20

Japan	4–1	Mexico
Shibata 32'; Naomoto 56'; Yokoyama 77'; Y. Tanaka 89' (pen.)	Report	Huerta 90+1'

Miyagi Stadium, Rifu
Attendance: 9,542
Referee: Christine Baitinger (Germany)

22 August 2012
16:20

Mexico	2–0	Switzerland
Huerta 46'; Jiménez 90+1'	Report

Miyagi Stadium, Rifu
Attendance: 9,061
Referee: Ana Marques (Brazil)

22 August 2012
19:20

Japan	2–2	New Zealand
Y. Tanaka 37'; Michigami 71'	Report	Nakada 11' (o.g.); White 15'

Miyagi Stadium, Rifu
Attendance: 9,061
Referee: Silvia Spinelli (Italy)

26 August 2012
19:20

Mexico	4–0	New Zealand
Huerta 47'; Gómez Junco 74'; Franco 85'; Jiménez 87'	Report

Kobe Universiade Memorial Stadium, Kobe
Attendance: 4,659
Referee: Teodora Albon (Romania)

26 August 2012
19:20

Switzerland	0–4	Japan
	Report	Y. Tanaka 30', 47'; Nishikawa 52'; Naomoto 84' (pen.)

Japan National Stadium, Tokyo
Attendance: 16,914
Referee: Margaret Domka (United States)

=== Group B ===
Team	Pld	W	D	L	GF	GA	GD	Pts
Nigeria	3	2	1	0	7	1	+6	7
South Korea	3	2	0	1	4	2	+2	6
Brazil	3	0	2	1	2	4	−2	2
Italy	3	0	1	2	1	7	−6	1

19 August 2012
15:00

Brazil	1–1	Italy
Amanda 90+2'	Report	Linari 38'

Urawa Komaba Stadium, Saitama
Attendance: 2,511
Referee: Margaret Domka (United States)

19 August 2012
18:00

Nigeria	2–0	South Korea
Okobi 15'; Oparanozie 67'	Report

Urawa Komaba Stadium, Saitama
Attendance: 2,511
Referee: Dianne Ferreira-James (Guyana)

22 August 2012
15:00

Brazil	1–1	Nigeria
Giovanna Oliveira 87'	Report	Ordega 44'

Urawa Komaba Stadium, Saitama
Attendance: 2,539
Referee: Esther Staubli (Switzerland)

22 August 2012
18:00

Italy	0–2	South Korea
	Report	Lee Geum-Min 54'; Jeoun Eun-Ha 56'

Urawa Komaba Stadium, Saitama
Attendance: 2,539
Referee: Lucila Venegas (Mexico)

26 August 2012
16:20

Italy	0–4	Nigeria
	Report	Ordega 22', 40', 47'; Igbinovia 86'

Kobe Universiade Memorial Stadium, Kobe
Attendance: 4,659
Referee: Qin Liang (China)

26 August 2012
16:20

South Korea	2–0	Brazil
Jeoun Eun-Ha 74', 82'	Report

Japan National Stadium, Tokyo
Attendance: 16,914
Referee: Christine Baitinger (Germany)

=== Group C ===
North Korea's 9–0 win over Argentina set a new competition record as highest win.

Team	Pld	W	D	L	GF	GA	GD	Pts
North Korea	3	3	0	0	15	3	+12	9
Norway	3	2	0	1	8	6	+2	6
Canada	3	1	0	2	8	4	+4	3
Argentina	3	0	0	3	1	19	−18	0

20 August 2012
16:00

North Korea	4–2	Norway
Yun Hyon-hi 15', 40' (pen.); Kim Un-hwa 72'; Kim Su-gyong 77'	Report	Hansen 23'; Ad. Hegerberg 54'

Kobe Universiade Memorial Stadium, Kobe
Attendance: 3,468
Referee: Lucila Venegas (Mexico)

20 August 2012
19:00

Argentina	0–6	Canada
	Report	Zadorsky 7' (pen.); Sawicki 20'; Leon 22', 42', 45+1'; Charron-Delage 86'

Kobe Universiade Memorial Stadium, Kobe
Attendance: 3,468
Referee: Esther Staubli (Switzerland)

23 August 2012
16:00

North Korea	9–0	Argentina
Yun Hyon-hi 16'; Kim Un-hwa 26', 30', 41', 45+2', 56'; Kim Su-gyong 38', 44', 55'	Report

Kobe Universiade Memorial Stadium, Kobe
Attendance: 3,144
Referee: Fadouma Dia (Senegal)

23 August 2012
19:00

Norway	2–1	Canada
Ad. Hegerberg 52'; An. Hegerberg 79'	Report	Richardson 44'

Kobe Universiade Memorial Stadium, Kobe
Attendance: 3,144
Referee: Qin Liang (China)

27 August 2012
19:00

Norway	4–1	Argentina
Haavi 25'; Hansen 70'; An. Hegerberg 85'; Skaug 90+3'	Report	Oviedo 82'

Miyagi Stadium, Rifu
Attendance: 1,712
Referee: Nami Sato (Japan)

27 August 2012
19:00

Canada	1–2	North Korea
Exeter 12'	Report	Kim Un-hwa 33'; Yun Hyon-hi 78' (pen.)

Urawa Komaba Stadium, Saitama
Attendance: 4,182
Referee: Pernilla Larsson (Sweden)

=== Group D ===
Team	Pld	W	D	L	GF	GA	GD	Pts
Germany	3	3	0	0	8	0	+8	9
United States	3	1	1	1	5	4	+1	4
China	3	1	1	1	2	5	−3	4
Ghana	3	0	0	3	0	6	−6	0

20 August 2012
16:00

Ghana	0–4	United States
	Report	Addai 20' (o.g.); Hayes 50', 74', 90+2'

Hiroshima Big Arch, Hiroshima
Attendance: 2,582
Referee: Teodora Albon (Romania)

20 August 2012
19:00

Germany	4–0	China
Lotzen 3'; Hegenauer 45'; Lin Yuping 74' (o.g.); Wensing 90+1'	Report

Hiroshima Big Arch, Hiroshima
Attendance: 2,582
Referee: Ana Marques (Brazil)

23 August 2012
16:00

Ghana	0–1	Germany
	Report	Magull 90+1'

Hiroshima Big Arch, Hiroshima
Attendance: 3,559
Referee: Nami Sato (Japan)

23 August 2012
19:00

United States	1–1	China
Hayes 36'	Report	Shen Lili 19'

Hiroshima Big Arch, Hiroshima
Attendance: 3,559
Referee: Pernilla Larsson (Sweden)

27 August 2012
16:00

United States	0–3	Germany
	Report	Lotzen 35', 53'; Leupolz 55'

Miyagi Stadium, Rifu
Attendance: 1,712
Referee: Abirami Apbai (Singapore)

27 August 2012
16:00

China	1–0	Ghana
Zhao Xindi 35'	Report

Urawa Komaba Stadium, Saitama
Attendance: 4,182
Referee: Dianne Ferreira-James (Guyana)

== Knockout stage ==
In the knockout stages, if a match is level at the end of normal playing time, extra time shall be played (two periods of 15 minutes each) and followed, if necessary, by kicks from the penalty mark to determine the winner, except for the play-off for third place where no extra time shall be played as the match is played directly before the final.

Quarter-finals
30 August – Tokyo
Nigeria (a.e.t.)	1
Mexico	0
31 August – Saitama
North Korea	1
United States (a.e.t.)	2
30 August – Tokyo
Japan	3
South Korea	1
31 August – Saitama
Germany	4
Norway	0

Semi-finals
4 September – Tokyo
Nigeria	0
United States	2
4 September – Tokyo
Japan	0
Germany	3

Final
8 September – Tokyo
United States	1
Germany	0
Third place
8 September – Tokyo
Nigeria	1
Japan	2

=== Quarter-finals ===
30 August 2012
16:00

Nigeria	1–0 (a.e.t.)	Mexico
Oparanozie 109'	Report

Japan National Stadium, Tokyo
Attendance: 24,097
Referee: Abirami Apbai (Singapore)

30 August 2012
19:30

Japan	3–1	South Korea
Shibata 8', 19'; Y. Tanaka 37'	Report	Jeoun Eun-Ha 15'

Japan National Stadium, Tokyo
Attendance: 24,097
Referee: Teodora Albon (Romania)

31 August 2012
16:00

Germany	4–0	Norway
Lotzen 5', 20'; Leupolz 7'; Wensing 85'	Report

Urawa Komaba Stadium, Saitama
Attendance: 6,284
Referee: Margaret Domka (United States)

31 August 2012
19:30

North Korea	1–2 (a.e.t.)	United States
Kim Su-gyong 75'	Report	DiBernardo 52'; Ubogagu 98'

Urawa Komaba Stadium, Saitama
Attendance: 6,284
Referee: Silvia Spinelli (Italy)

=== Semi-finals ===
4 September 2012
16:00

Nigeria	0–2	United States
	Report	Brian 22'; Ohai 70'

Japan National Stadium, Tokyo
Attendance: 28,306
Referee: Esther Staubli (Switzerland)

4 September 2012
19:30

Japan	0–3	Germany
	Report	Leupolz 1'; Marozsán 13'; Lotzen 19'

Japan National Stadium, Tokyo
Attendance: 28,306
Referee: Lucila Venegas (Mexico)

=== Third place match ===
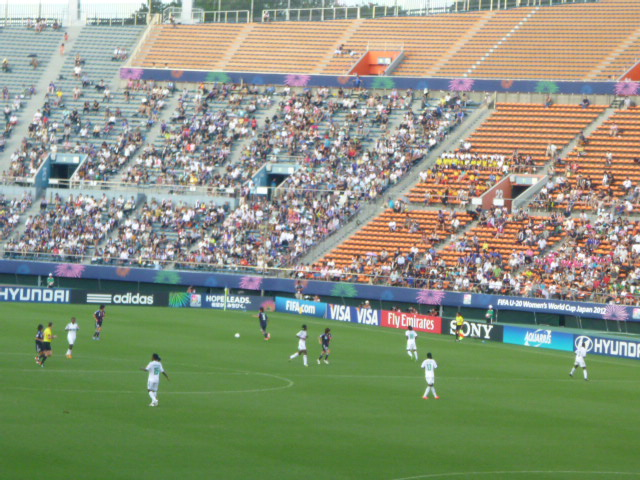
Nigeria vs. Japan

8 September 2012
15:30

Nigeria	1–2	Japan
Oparanozie 73'	Report	Y. Tanaka 24'; Nishikawa 50'

Japan National Stadium, Tokyo
Attendance: 31,114
Referee: Margaret Domka (United States)

=== Final ===
8 September 2012
19:20

United States	1–0	Germany
Ohai 44'	Report

Japan National Stadium, Tokyo
Attendance: 31,114
Referee: Pernilla Larsson (Sweden)

2012 FIFA U-20 Women's World Cup winners

United States
Third title

== Awards ==
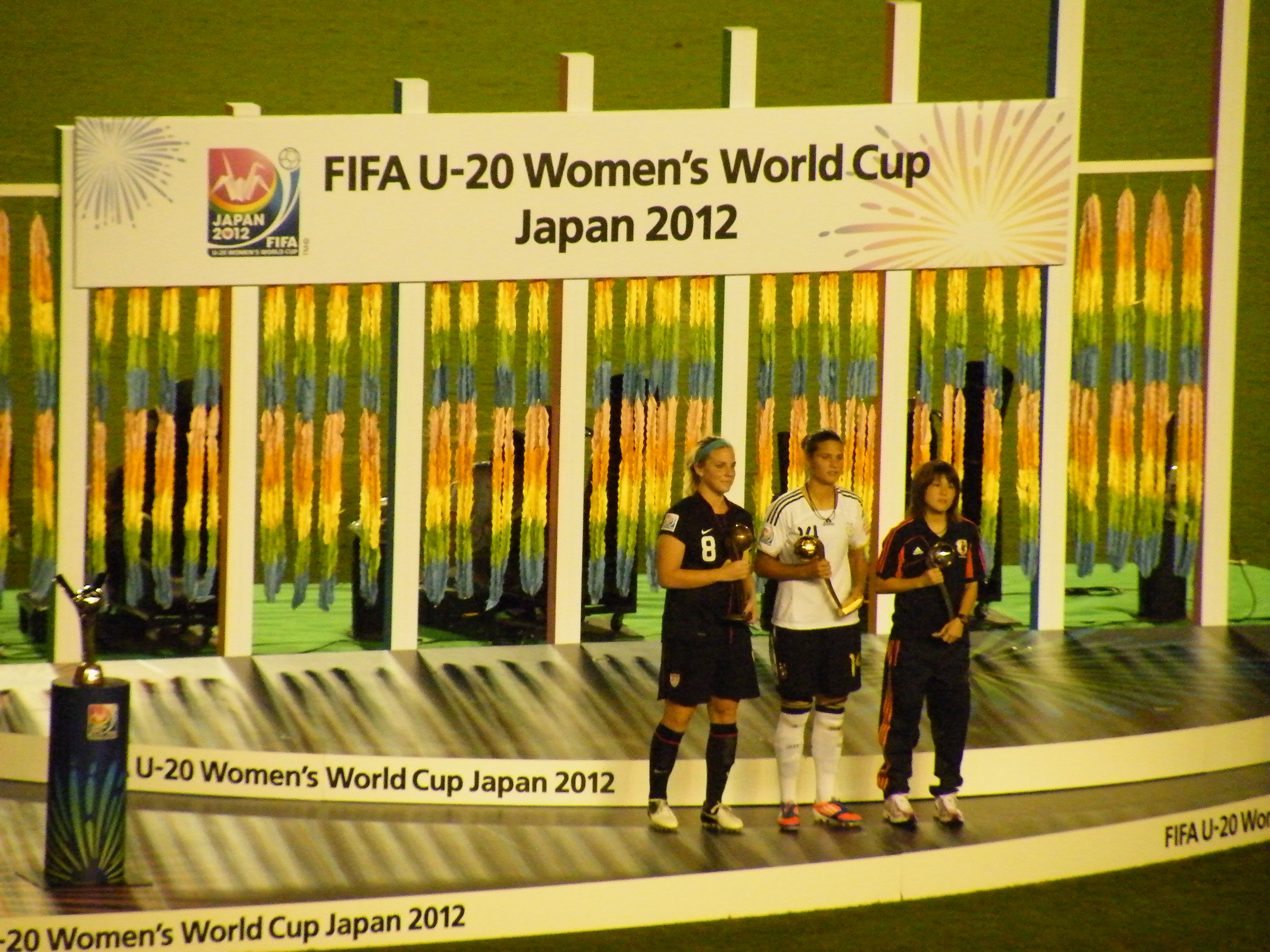
L-R: Julie Johnston (Bronze Ball), Dzsenifer Marozsán (Golden Ball) and Hanae Shibata (Silver Ball).

The following awards were given for the tournament:

Golden Ball	Silver Ball	Bronze Ball
(Germany) Dzsenifer Marozsán	(Japan) Hanae Shibata	(United States) Julie Johnston
Golden Shoe	Silver Shoe	Bronze Shoe
(North Korea) Kim Un-hwa	(Japan) Yōko Tanaka	(Germany) Lena Lotzen
7 goals	6 goals	6 goals
Golden Glove
(Germany) Laura Benkarth
FIFA Fair Play Award
Japan

== Goalscorers ==
7 goals

- (North Korea) Kim Un-hwa

6 goals

- (Germany) Lena Lotzen
- (Japan) Yōko Tanaka

5 goals

- (North Korea) Kim Su-gyong

4 goals

- (Nigeria) Francisca Ordega
- (North Korea) Yun Hyon-hi
- (South Korea) Jeoun Eun-ha
- (United States) Maya Hayes

3 goals

- (Canada) Adriana Leon
- (Germany) Melanie Leupolz
- (Japan) Hanae Shibata
- (Mexico) Sofia Huerta
- (Nigeria) Desire Oparanozie

2 goals

- (Germany) Luisa Wensing
- (Japan) Hikaru Naomoto
- (Japan) Asuka Nishikawa
- (Mexico) Olivia Jiménez
- (New Zealand) Rosie White
- (Norway) Caroline Hansen
- (Norway) Ada Hegerberg
- (Norway) Andrine Hegerberg
- (United States) Kealia Ohai

1 goal

- (Argentina) Yael Oviedo
- (Brazil) Amanda
- (Brazil) Giovanna Oliveira
- (Canada) Catherine Charron-Delage
- (Canada) Christine Exeter
- (Canada) Jenna Richardson
- (Canada) Jaclyn Sawicki
- (Canada) Shelina Zadorsky
- (China) Shen Lili
- (China) Zhao Xindi
- (Germany) Anja Hegenauer
- (Germany) Lina Magull
- (Germany) Dzsenifer Marozsán
- (Italy) Elena Linari
- (Japan) Ayaka Michigami
- (Japan) Kumi Yokoyama
- (Mexico) Natalia Gómez Junco
- (Mexico) Yamile Franco
- (New Zealand) Evie Myllin
- (Nigeria) Osarenoma Igbinovia
- (Nigeria) Ngozi Okobe
- (Norway) Emilie Haavi
- (Norway) Ina Skaug
- (South Korea) Lee Geum-min
- (Switzerland) Eseosa Aigbogun
- (United States) Morgan Brian
- (United States) Vanessa DiBernardo
- (United States) Chioma Ubogagu

Own Goal

- (China) Lin Yuping
- (Ghana) Linda Addai
- (Japan) Ayu Nakada
