= 2008 FIFA U-17 Women's World Cup squads =

The following is a list of squads for each nation competing at the 2008 FIFA U-17 Women's World Cup in New Zealand. The tournament started on 28 October and the final took place in Auckland on 16 November 2008.

Each nation had to submit a squad of 21 players, three of which had to be goalkeepers, for the tournament.

Ages as of 28 October 2008.

== Group A ==
=== Canada ===
Head coach: Bryan Rosenfeld

No.	Pos.	Player	Date of birth (age)	Caps	Club
1	GK	Cynthia LeBlanc	12 January 1991 (aged 17)		(Canada) Ontario National Training Centre
2	DF	Kayla Afonso	20 September 1991 (aged 17)		(Canada) Ontario National Training Centre
3	DF	Bryanna McCarthy	13 October 1991 (aged 17)		(Canada) Ontario National Training Centre
4	DF	Marialye Laramee-Trottier	13 March 1991 (aged 17)		(Canada) Quebec National Training Centre
5	MF	Alyscha Mottershead	25 May 1991 (aged 17)		(Canada) Ontario National Training Centre
6	MF	Shelina Zadorsky	24 October 1992 (aged 16)		(Canada) Ontario National Training Centre
7	FW	Annick Maltais	11 February 1991 (aged 17)		(Canada) Quebec National Training Centre
8	MF	Caroline Szwed	18 November 1991 (aged 16)		(Canada) Ontario National Training Centre
9	FW	Amy Harrison	5 August 1991 (aged 17)		(Canada) University of Manitoba
10	FW	Tiffany Cameron	16 October 1991 (aged 17)		(Canada) Ontario National Training Centre
11	DF	Karli Hedlund	10 February 1991 (aged 17)		(Canada) Alberta National Training Centre
12	FW	Nkem Ezurike	19 March 1992 (aged 16)		(Canada) Nova Scotia F.C.
13	MF	Danica Wu	13 August 1992 (aged 16)		(Canada) Alberta National Training Centre
14	FW	Rachel Lamarre	17 April 1991 (aged 17)		(Canada) Quebec National Training Centre
15	MF	Julia Ignacio	23 January 1991 (aged 17)		(Canada) Alberta National Training Centre
16	DF	Alexandra Smith	24 September 1991 (aged 17)		(Canada) Alberta National Training Centre
17	MF	Nicole Mitchell	5 March 1992 (aged 16)		(Canada) Ontario National Training Centre
18	GK	Sabrina D'Angelo	11 May 1993 (aged 15)		(Canada) Ontario National Training Centre
19	FW	Diamond Simpson	28 April 1993 (aged 15)		(Canada) Ontario National Training Centre
20	DF	Lauren Granberg	28 February 1992 (aged 16)		(Canada) Alberta National Training Centre
21	GK	Genevieve Richard	17 August 1992 (aged 16)		(Canada) Quebec National Training Centre

=== Colombia ===
Head coach: Pedro Rodríguez

No.	Pos.	Player	Date of birth (age)	Caps	Club
1	GK	María Echeverri	20 June 1991 (aged 17)		(Colombia) Bogota
2	DF	Lina Taborda	2 November 1991 (aged 16)		(Colombia) Quindio
3	DF	Natalia Gaitán	3 April 1991 (aged 17)		(Colombia) Bogota
4	MF	Diana Vélez	4 April 1993 (aged 15)		(Colombia) Vallecaucana
5	MF	Natalia Ariza	21 February 1991 (aged 17)		(Colombia) Cundinamarca
6	DF	Edna Méndez	22 January 1991 (aged 17)		(Colombia) Tolima
7	FW	Nahiomy Ortiz	13 January 1992 (aged 16)		(Canada) Victoria United
8	MF	Alejandra Quintero	25 November 1991 (aged 16)		(Colombia) Bogota
9	FW	Ingrid Vidal	22 April 1991 (aged 17)		(Colombia) Vallecaucana
10	MF	Yoreli Rincón	27 July 1993 (aged 15)		(Colombia) Tolima
11	MF	Liana Salazar	16 September 1992 (aged 16)		(Colombia) Bogota
12	GK	Paula Forero	25 January 1992 (aged 16)		(Colombia) Bogota
13	MF	Gaby Santos	1 February 1993 (aged 15)		(Colombia) Tolima
14	MF	Paola Bayona	13 March 1992 (aged 16)		(Colombia) Bogota
15	MF	Tatiana Ariza	21 February 1991 (aged 17)		(Colombia) Cundinamarca
16	MF	Paola Sánchez	19 September 1991 (aged 17)		(Colombia) Bogota
17	MF	Ana María Montoya	24 September 1991 (aged 17)		(United States) Oregon
18	MF	Gabriela Huertas	17 June 1991 (aged 17)		(Colombia) Bogota
19	MF	Andrea Hernández	15 January 1991 (aged 17)		(United States) Crossfire Premier
20	MF	Vanessa Aponte	15 October 1991 (aged 17)		(United States) FC America
21	GK	Stefany Castaño	11 January 1994 (aged 14)		(Colombia) Bogota

=== Denmark ===
Head coach: Bent Eriksen

No.	Pos.	Player	Date of birth (age)	Caps	Club
1	GK	Lene Gissel	7 April 1991 (aged 17)		(Denmark) Skovbakken
2	DF	Line Ostergaard	30 April 1992 (aged 16)		(Denmark) Viborg
3	DF	Line Sigvardsen Jensen	23 August 1991 (aged 17)		(Denmark) B52 Aalborg
4	DF	Pernille Ramlov	11 April 1991 (aged 17)		(Denmark) B52 Aalborg
5	MF	Simone Boye Sørensen	3 March 1992 (aged 16)		(Denmark) B52 Aalborg
6	DF	Louise Brix	20 September 1993 (aged 15)		(Denmark) Odense BK
7	MF	Sofie Junge Pedersen	24 April 1992 (aged 16)		(Denmark) Skovbakken
8	FW	Katrine Veje	19 June 1991 (aged 17)		(Denmark) Odense BK
9	DF	Britta Olsen	8 May 1991 (aged 17)		(Denmark) Odense BK
10	MF	Amanda Hohol	26 February 1992 (aged 16)		(Denmark) Brondby
11	MF	Liv Havgaard Nyhegn	25 April 1992 (aged 16)		(Denmark) Odense BK
12	MF	Pernille Harder	15 November 1992 (aged 15)		(Denmark) Team Viborg
13	FW	Linette Andreasen	19 September 1991 (aged 17)		(Denmark) Skovbakken
14	FW	Laerke Lillelund Michaelsen	7 March 1992 (aged 16)		(Denmark) Horsens SIK
15	FW	Tenna Kappel	20 March 1992 (aged 16)		(Denmark) Team Viborg
16	GK	Esther Dam Sorensen	21 May 1992 (aged 16)		(Denmark) Lemvig GF
17	FW	Anne Rudmose	3 January 1991 (aged 17)		(Denmark) Team Viborg
18	MF	Michelle Madsen	16 March 1991 (aged 17)		(Denmark) Lemvig GF
19	DF	Camilla Christensen	18 October 1992 (aged 16)		(Denmark) Skovbakken
20	DF	Nina Frausing-Pedersen	20 June 1991 (aged 17)		(Denmark) Skovbakken
21	GK	Tanja Ingeman	21 September 1993 (aged 15)		(Denmark) Odense BK

=== New Zealand ===
Head coach: Paul Temple

No.	Pos.	Player	Date of birth (age)	Caps	Club
1	GK	Charlotte Wood	5 November 1991 (aged 16)		(New Zealand) Three Kings United
2	DF	Anna Fullerton	20 July 1991 (aged 17)		(New Zealand) Glenfield Rovers
3	DF	Rebecca Brown	31 July 1991 (aged 17)		(New Zealand) Eastern Suburbs FC
4	MF	Leah Gallie	3 October 1991 (aged 17)		(New Zealand) Glenfield Rovers
5	DF	Briony Fisher (c)	22 August 1991 (aged 17)		(New Zealand) Western Springs FC
6	DF	Bridgette Armstrong	9 November 1991 (aged 16)		(New Zealand) Glenfield Rovers
7	MF	Caitlin Campbell	2 February 1991 (aged 17)		(New Zealand) Glenfield Rovers
8	FW	Sarah McLaughlin	3 June 1991 (aged 17)		(New Zealand) Claudeland Rovers FC
9	MF	Hannah Wall	3 May 1991 (aged 17)		(New Zealand) Waterside Karori AFC
10	MF	Annalie Longo	1 July 1991 (aged 17)		(New Zealand) Three Kings United
11	FW	Rosie White	6 June 1993 (aged 15)		(New Zealand) Western Springs FC
12	MF	Claudia Crasborn	17 July 1991 (aged 17)		(New Zealand) Western Springs FC
13	MF	Nadia Pearl	20 October 1992 (aged 16)		(New Zealand) Three Kings United
14	MF	Katie Bowen	15 April 1994 (aged 14)		(New Zealand) Glenfield Rovers
15	GK	Victoria Esson	6 March 1991 (aged 17)		(New Zealand) Fencibles United
16	FW	Megan Shea	9 July 1992 (aged 16)		(New Zealand) Coastal Spirit
17	MF	Jessica Rollings	3 January 1991 (aged 17)		(New Zealand) Glenfield Rovers
18	FW	Lauren Mathis	30 May 1991 (aged 17)		(New Zealand) Glenfield Rovers
19	FW	Lauren Murray	31 May 1992 (aged 16)		(New Zealand) Three Kings United
20	GK	Danielle McFadyen	12 February 1991 (aged 17)		(New Zealand) Western Springs FC
21	DF	Yumi Nguyen	21 April 1991 (aged 17)		(New Zealand) Waterside Karori AFC

== Group B ==
=== Costa Rica ===
Head coach: Juan Quesada

No.	Pos.	Player	Date of birth (age)	Caps	Club
1	GK	Priscilla Tapia	2 May 1991 (aged 17)		(Costa Rica) Puntarenas
2	DF	Lina Jaramillo	9 July 1992 (aged 16)		(Costa Rica) San Jose
3	DF	Daniela Vega	19 February 1991 (aged 17)		(Costa Rica) Cartago
4	DF	María Barquero	7 February 1992 (aged 16)		(Costa Rica) San Jose
5	DF	Gabriela Guillén	1 March 1992 (aged 16)		(Costa Rica) San Jose
6	FW	Jazmine Guzmán	30 July 1991 (aged 17)		(Costa Rica) Canas
7	MF	Mariela Campos	4 January 1991 (aged 17)		(Costa Rica) Alajuela
8	DF	Daniela Cruz	8 March 1991 (aged 17)		(Costa Rica) Sportek
9	FW	Carolina Morales	28 September 1991 (aged 17)		(Costa Rica) San Jose
10	MF	Katherine Alvarado	11 April 1991 (aged 17)		(Costa Rica) San Jose
11	FW	Raquel Rodríguez	28 October 1993 (aged 15)		(Costa Rica) San Jose
12	FW	Raquel Rodriguez Vásquez	3 August 1991 (aged 17)		(Costa Rica) Grecia
13	MF	Jacquelline Mata	14 October 1991 (aged 17)		(Costa Rica) Alajuela
14	MF	Daniella Camacho	3 February 1992 (aged 16)		(Costa Rica) Alajuela
15	DF	Adriana Guzmán	30 July 1991 (aged 17)		(Costa Rica) Canas
16	DF	Krickshia Spence	20 March 1991 (aged 17)		(Costa Rica) Sportek
17	FW	Yocxelin Rodríguez	15 April 1992 (aged 16)		(Costa Rica) San Jose
18	GK	María Arias	4 May 1991 (aged 17)		(Costa Rica) Alajuela
19	DF	Fabiola Sánchez	9 April 1993 (aged 15)		(Costa Rica) Alajuela
20	MF	Hazel Quirós	7 July 1992 (aged 16)		(Costa Rica) Alajuela
21	GK	Jakellene Palacios	23 July 1993 (aged 15)		(United States) Aliso H.S.

=== Germany ===
Head coach: Ralf Peter

No.	Pos.	Player	Date of birth (age)	Caps	Club
1	GK	Anna Felicitas Sarholz	5 July 1992 (aged 16)		(Germany) 1. FFC Turbine Potsdam
2	MF	Angelina Lübcke	24 February 1991 (aged 17)		(Germany) Hamburger SV
3	DF	Inka Wesely	10 May 1991 (aged 17)		(Germany) SGS Essen
4	DF	Valeria Kleiner	27 March 1991 (aged 17)		(Germany) SC Freiburg
5	DF	Carolin Simon	24 November 1992 (aged 15)		(Germany) TSV Jahn Calden
6	MF	Marie-Louise Bagehorn	7 July 1991 (aged 17)		(Germany) 1. FFC Turbine Potsdam
7	MF	Turid Knaak	24 January 1991 (aged 17)		(Germany) FCR 2001 Duisburg
8	MF	Lynn Mester	27 March 1992 (aged 16)		(Germany) Westfalia Osterwick
9	FW	Tabea Kemme	14 December 1991 (aged 16)		(Germany) 1. FFC Turbine Potsdam
10	FW	Dzsenifer Marozsán	18 April 1992 (aged 16)		(Germany) 1. FC Saarbrücken
11	FW	Alexandra Popp	6 April 1991 (aged 17)		(Germany) FCR 2001 Duisburg
12	GK	Almuth Schult	9 February 1991 (aged 17)		(Germany) Magdeburger FFC
13	DF	Julia Debitzki	25 June 1991 (aged 17)		(Germany) SG Wattenscheid 09
14	FW	Ivana Rudelić	25 January 1992 (aged 16)		(Germany) FC Bayern Munich
15	FW	Hasret Kayikçi	6 November 1991 (aged 16)		(Germany) FCR 2001 Duisburg
16	FW	Nicole Rolser	7 February 1992 (aged 16)		(Germany) VfL Sindelfingen
17	MF	Isabelle Linden	15 January 1991 (aged 17)		(Germany) SGS Essen
18	FW	Svenja Huth	25 January 1991 (aged 17)		(Germany) 1. FFC Frankfurt
19	MF	Claudia Götte	7 September 1992 (aged 16)		(Germany) Westfalia Scherfede
20	DF	Leonie Maier	29 September 1992 (aged 16)		(Germany) JSG Remseck
21	GK	Lisa Schmitz	4 May 1992 (aged 16)		(Germany) Bayer 04 Leverkusen

=== Ghana ===
Head coach: Abraham Allotey

No.	Pos.	Player	Date of birth (age)	Caps	Club
1	GK	Margaret Otoo	1 September 1993 (15)		(Ghana) Ghatel Ladies Accra
2	DF	Henrietta Annie	1 August 1991 (17)		(Ghana) Post Ladies
3	DF	Edem Atovor	10 April 1994 (14)		(Ghana) Ghatel Ladies Accra
4	DF	Linda Eshun	5 August 1992 (16)		(Ghana) Hasaacas Ladies
5	DF	Ellen Coleman	11 December 1995 (12)		(Ghana) Ghatel Ladies Accra
6	MF	Elizabeth Cudjoe	17 October 1992 (16)		(Ghana) Hasaacas Ladies
7	MF	Juliet Acheampong	11 July 1991 (17)		(Ghana) Ash Town Ladies
8	MF	Elizabeth Addo	1 September 1993 (15)		(Ghana) Athleta Ladies
9	FW	Florence Dadson	23 April 1992 (16)		(Ghana) Ghatel Ladies Accra
10	MF	Mercy Myles	2 May 1992 (16)		(Ghana) Nungua Ladies
11	FW	Isha Fordjour	18 June 1993 (15)		(Ghana) La Ladies Accra
12	DF	Mantenn Kobblah	7 July 1991 (17)		(Ghana) Faith Ladies
13	DF	Priscilla Okine	28 November 1993 (14)		(Ghana) Sunsport Ladies
14	FW	Deborah Afriyie	3 January 1992 (16)		(Ghana) Oforikrom Ladies
15	DF	Rosemary Ampem	27 August 1992 (16)		(Ghana) Ash Town Ladies
16	GK	Patricia Mantey	27 September 1992 (16)		(Ghana) Mawuena Ladies
17	MF	Abena Ampomah	5 September 1991 (17)		(Ghana) Ghatel Ladies Accra
18	FW	Samira Suleman	16 August 1991 (17)		(Ghana) Hasaacas Ladies
19	FW	Candice Osei-Agyemang	9 April 1992 (16)		(United States) Northwest Nationals
20	MF	Priscilla Saahene	24 July 1992 (16)		(Ghana) Ash Town Ladies
21	GK	Linda Aboagye	25 October 1991 (17)		(Ghana) Ash Town Ladies

=== North Korea ===
Head coach: Ri Ui-ham

No.	Pos.	Player	Date of birth (age)	Caps	Club
1	GK	Hong Myong-hui	4 September 1991 (17)		(North Korea) April 25 Sports Group
2	DF	Hyon Un-hui	22 November 1991 (17)		(North Korea) April 25 Sports Group
3	DF	Jon Hong-yon	11 June 1992 (16)		(North Korea) April 25 Sports Group
4	DF	Ryu Un-jong	20 April 1992 (16)		(North Korea) Rimyongsu
5	DF	Kim Sol-hui	4 June 1991 (17)		(North Korea) Sobaeksu
6	MF	Kim Un-ju	9 April 1993 (15)		(North Korea) April 25 Sports Group
7	MF	Kim Un-ju	6 June 1992 (16)		(North Korea) April 25 Sports Group
8	MF	Pae Yon-hui	27 November 1992 (16)		(North Korea) April 25 Sports Group
9	MF	Ho Un-byol	19 January 1992 (16)		(North Korea) April 25 Sports Group
10	FW	Jon Myong-hwa	9 August 1993 (15)		(North Korea) April 25 Sports Group
11	FW	Yun Hyon-hi	9 September 1992 (16)		(North Korea) Chobyong
12	DF	Kim Hyon-hi	30 November 1992 (16)		(North Korea) April 25 Sports Group
13	DF	Jo Myong-hui	6 July 1991 (17)		(North Korea) April 25 Sports Group
14	DF	Ro Chol-ok	3 January 1993 (15)		(North Korea) April 25 Sports Group
15	MF	Ri Un-ae	31 May 1993 (15)		(North Korea) Rimyongsu
16	FW	Cha-ok	21 October 1992 (16)		(North Korea) Amrokgang
17	FW	Jong Yu-ri	21 June 1992 (16)		(North Korea) Sobaeksu
18	DF	Kim Un-hyang	26 August 1993 (15)		(North Korea) April 25 Sports Group
19	FW	Jang Hyon-sun	1 July 1991 (17)		(North Korea) Wolmido
20	GK	Ri Hyang-hui	30 September 1992 (16)		(North Korea) Chobyong
21	GK	Kim Su-jong	3 June 1991 (17)		(North Korea) April 25 Sports Group

== Group C ==
=== France ===
Head coach: Gerard Sergent

No.	Pos.	Player	Date of birth (age)	Caps	Club
1	GK	Laëtitia Philippe	30 April 1991 (17)		(France) Montpellier
2	DF	Floriane Hellio	18 May 1992 (16)		(France) Stade Briochin
3	DF	Caroline La Villa	12 February 1992 (16)		(France) Montpellier
4	DF	Adeline Rousseau	24 July 1991 (17)		(France) Verchers St Georges/Layon
5	DF	Annaïg Butel	15 February 1992 (16)		(France) Juvisy
6	MF	Léa Rubio	6 May 1991 (17)		(France) Monteux
7	MF	Ines Jaurena	14 May 1991 (17)		(France) St Maur
8	MF	Charlotte Poulain	15 May 1991 (17)		(France) Évreux
9	FW	Pauline Crammer	14 February 1991 (17)		(France) Hénin-Beaumont
10	FW	Solene Barbance	13 August 1991 (17)		(France) Rodez
11	MF	Marina Makanza	1 July 1991 (17)		(France) Saint-Étienne
12	FW	Marine Augis	12 June 1991 (17)		(France) Tours
13	MF	Rose Lavaud	6 April 1992 (16)		(France) Limoges Landouge
14	DF	Kelly Gadéa	16 December 1991 (16)		(France) Saint-Étienne
15	MF	Charlene Olivier	6 March 1992 (16)		(France) Gravelinoise
16	GK	Solene Chauvet	8 October 1991 (17)		(France) La Roche/Yon
17	MF	Kelly Perdrizet	6 September 1991 (17)		(France) Tours
18	MF	Justine Dubois	17 February 1992 (16)		(France) Gravelines
19	FW	Cindy Thomas	8 March 1992 (16)		(France) Paris SG
20	MF	Camille Catala	6 May 1991 (17)		(France) Saint-Étienne
21	GK	Laura Guilleux	21 May 1991 (17)		(France) Le Mans

=== Japan ===
Head coach: Hiroshi Yoshida

No.	Pos.	Player	Date of birth (age)	Caps	Club
1	GK	Saki Nakamura	1 August 1992 (16)		(Japan) JFA Academy Fukushima
2	DF	Kozue Chiba	7 October 1991 (17)		(Japan) Tokiwagi Gakuen H.S
3	DF	Minori Chiba	6 September 1991 (17)		(Japan) Urawa Reds Ladies
4	DF	Nagisa Okuda	3 April 1991 (17)		(Japan) Kamimura Gakuen H.S
5	DF	Natsuki Kishikawa (c)	26 April 1991 (17)		(Japan) Urawa Reds Ladies
6	MF	Natsumi Kameoka	5 January 1991 (17)		(Japan) JFA Academy Fukushima
7	MF	Chiaki Shimada	18 February 1992 (16)		(Japan) NTV Menina
8	MF	Yuko Takeyama	30 September 1991 (17)		(Japan) Urawa Reds Ladies
9	FW	Chinatsu Kira	5 July 1991 (17)		(Japan) Kamimura Gakuen H.S
10	FW	Mana Iwabuchi	18 March 1993 (15)		(Japan) NTV Menina
11	FW	Akane Saito	12 January 1993 (15)		(Japan) Tokiwagi Gakuen H.S
12	MF	Yuiko Inoue	12 October 1991 (17)		(Japan) JEF United Ichihara Ladies
13	MF	Takako Sugiyama	4 April 1991 (17)		(Japan) Tokoha Gakuen Tachibana H.S
14	FW	Kei Yoshioka	6 June 1991 (17)		(Japan) Victories
15	MF	Saori Takahashi	24 January 1992 (16)		(Japan) NTV Menina
16	GK	Sakiko Ikeda	8 September 1992 (16)		(Japan) Urawa Reds Ladies
17	DF	Minami Ishida	14 May 1991 (17)		(Japan) Tokoha Gakuen Tachibana H.S
18	DF	Marika Ohshima	17 July 1992 (16)		(Japan) Kamimura Gakuen H.S
19	MF	Haruka Hamada	26 January 1993 (15)		(Japan) JFA Academy Fukushima
20	MF	Yoko Tanaka	30 July 1993 (15)		(Japan) JFA Academy Fukushima
21	GK	Ayaka Saito	26 August 1991 (17)		(Japan) Tokiwagi Gakuen H.S

=== Paraguay ===
Head coach: Carlos Báez

No.	Pos.	Player	Date of birth (age)	Caps	Club
1	GK	Zulma Orué	20 May 1991 (17)		(Paraguay) Cerro Porteno
2	DF	Érika Rolón	27 January 1993 (15)		(Paraguay) Rakiura
3	DF	Cris Mabel Flores	25 September 1992 (16)		(Paraguay) Cerro Porteno
4	DF	Noelia Cuevas	3 January 1992 (16)		(Paraguay) UAA
5	DF	Paola Genes	14 June 1991 (17)		(Paraguay) Rakiura
6	MF	Jacqueline González	2 October 1991 (17)		(Paraguay) Rakiura
7	FW	Rebeca Fernández	1 December 1991 (16)		(Paraguay) Cerro Porteno
8	MF	Paola Zalazar	3 May 1993 (15)		(Paraguay) Rakiura
9	FW	Karen Ruiz Díaz	13 November 1991 (16)		(Paraguay) Olimpia Asuncion
10	MF	Ana Fleitas	8 August 1992 (16)		(Paraguay) Cerro Porteno
11	FW	Gloria Villamayor	10 April 1992 (16)		(Paraguay) Rakiura
12	GK	Sara Torres	3 October 1991 (17)		(Paraguay) Olimpia Asuncion
13	DF	Raquel Carreras	7 April 1992 (16)		(Paraguay) Olimpia Asuncion
14	MF	Evelyn Armoa	17 September 1991 (17)		(Paraguay) Rakiura
15	DF	Macarena Toledo	13 December 1992 (15)		(Paraguay) Cerro Porteno
16	FW	Mirna Díaz	1 September 1991 (17)		(Paraguay) UAA
17	MF	María Toledo	16 January 1993 (15)		(Paraguay) Cerro Porteno
18	DF	Jacqueline Rivas	27 October 1992 (16)		(Paraguay) Cerro Porteno
19	MF	Melissa Parada	23 July 1992 (16)		(Paraguay) Cerro Porteno
20	MF	María Talavera	6 September 1991 (17)		(Paraguay) UAA
21	GK	Vivian González	25 April 1991 (17)		(Paraguay) Olimpia Asuncion

=== United States ===
Head coach: Kazbek Tambi

No.	Pos.	Player	Date of birth (age)	Caps	Club
1	GK	Alexa Gaul	15 May 1991 (aged 17)		(United States) Eclipse Select
2	DF	Alexis Harris	6 December 1991 (aged 16)		(United States) Dallas Texans
3	DF	Amber Brooks	23 January 1991 (aged 17)		(United States) Arsenal Soccer
4	DF	Crystal Dunn	3 July 1992 (aged 16)		(United States) Albertson Fury
5	MF	Erika Tymrak	7 August 1991 (aged 17)		(United States) IMG Soccer Academy
6	DF	Cloee Colohan	1 June 1991 (aged 17)		(United States) Black Diamond Park City
7	FW	Courtney Verloo	9 May 1991 (aged 17)		(United States) South Side Strikers
8	FW	Vicki DiMartino	4 September 1991 (aged 17)		(United States) Albertson Fury
9	FW	Samantha Johnson	10 June 1991 (aged 17)		(United States) Real So Cal
10	MF	Kristie Mewis	25 February 1991 (aged 17)		(United States) Scorpions SC
11	MF	Samantha Mewis	9 October 1992 (aged 16)		(United States) Scorpions SC
12	FW	Hayley Brock	3 August 1992 (aged 16)		(United States) Stars of Massachusetts
13	DF	Julia Roberts	7 February 1991 (aged 17)		(United States) McLean Freedom
14	MF	Mandy Laddish	13 May 1992 (aged 16)		(United States) Blue Valley Stars
15	MF	Kate Bennett	3 December 1991 (aged 16)		(United States) Crossfire Premier
16	MF	Morgan Brian	26 February 1993 (aged 15)		(United States) Ponte Vedra
17	DF	Rachel Quon	21 May 1991 (aged 17)		(United States) Eclipse Select
18	GK	Taylor Vancil	18 May 1991 (aged 17)		(United States) Eclipse Select
19	MF	Elizabeth Eddy	13 September 1991 (aged 17)		(United States) Southern California Blues
20	MF	Olivia Klei	20 March 1991 (aged 17)		(United States) Pleasanton Rage
21	GK	Jennifer Pettigrew	22 June 1991 (aged 17)		(United States) Arsenal Soccer

== Group D ==
=== Brazil ===
Head coach: Marcos Gaspar

No.	Pos.	Player	Date of birth (age)	Caps	Club
1	GK	Aline	9 January 1992 (16)		(Brazil) Mixto
2	DF	Thatiane	16 May 1991 (17)		(Brazil) Avai
3	DF	Thaynara	2 March 1991 (17)		(Brazil) USS/Vassouras
4	DF	Tuani	19 January 1991 (17)		
5	MF	Bruna	7 July 1992 (16)		(Brazil) Atletico Mineiro
6	DF	Rafaelle Souza	18 June 1991 (17)		(Brazil) Sao Francisco
7	MF	Thaís	20 January 1993 (15)		(Brazil) Juventus
8	FW	Rafaela Baroni	31 December 1992 (15)		(Brazil) Tigres do Brasil
9	FW	Raquel	21 March 1991 (17)		(Brazil) Atletico Mineiro
10	MF	Beatriz	17 December 1993 (14)		(Brazil) Ferroviaria
11	FW	Franciele	26 January 1991 (17)		(Brazil) AJA Jaguariuna
12	GK	Eduarda	18 March 1991 (17)		(Brazil) Pelotas
13	DF	Carine	3 January 1991 (17)		(Brazil) A.E. Kindermann
14	DF	Fernanda	29 July 1991 (17)		(Brazil) Vila Fanny
15	DF	Juliana Cardozo	6 September 1991 (17)		(Brazil) Saad
16	MF	Taiana	4 April 1991 (17)		(Brazil) Sao Francisco
17	FW	Ketlen Wiggers	7 January 1992 (16)		(Brazil) Santos
18	MF	Juliana	22 December 1991 (16)		(Brazil) Team Chicago Brasil
19	FW	Rafaela	31 January 1991 (17)		(Brazil) Vila Fanny
20	FW	Ana Caroline	3 November 1992 (15)		(Brazil) Cepe Caxias
21	GK	Dani Neuhaus	21 March 1993 (15)		(Brazil) Guarani

=== England ===
Head coach: Lois Fidler

No.	Pos.	Player	Date of birth (age)	Caps	Club
1	GK	Lauren Davey	1 June 1991 (17)		(England) Watford L.F.C.
2	DF	Rachel Daly	6 December 1991 (16)		(England) Leeds Carnegie L.F.C.
3	DF	Naomi Chadwick	22 September 1991 (17)		(England) Doncaster Rovers Belles
4	MF	Jess Holbrook	1 August 1992 (16)		(England) Everton F.C.
5	DF	Jodie Jacobs	4 February 1991 (17)		(England) Chelsea L.F.C.
6	DF	Gemma Bonner	13 July 1991 (17)		(England) Leeds Carnegie L.F.C.
7	MF	Rebecca Jane	31 March 1992 (16)		(England) Chelsea L.F.C.
8	MF	Jordan Nobbs	8 December 1992 (15)		(England) Sunderland F.C.
9	FW	Danielle Carter	18 May 1993 (15)		(England) Leyton Orient F.C.
10	MF	Izzy Christiansen	20 September 1991 (17)		(England) Everton F.C.
11	MF	Lucy Staniforth	2 October 1992 (16)		(England) Sunderland F.C.
12	DF	Lucy Bronze	28 October 1991 (17)		(England) Sunderland F.C.
13	GK	Amy Carr	27 April 1991 (17)		(England) Reading F.C.
14	DF	Stephanie Marsh	15 October 1991 (17)		(England) Everton F.C.
15	DF	Jemma Rose	19 January 1992 (16)		(England) Plymouth Argyle L.F.C.
16	FW	Lauren Bruton	22 November 1992 (15)		(England) Arsenal L.F.C.
17	FW	Sarah Wiltshire	7 July 1991 (17)		(England) Watford L.F.C.
18	DF	Rachel Pitman	6 December 1991 (16)		(England) Bristol Academy W.F.C.
19	FW	Paige Eli	5 August 1993 (15)		(England) West Riding F.C.
20	FW	Kirsty Linnett	24 September 1993 (15)		(England) Leicester City W.F.C.
21	GK	Juliana Draycott	15 July 1992 (16)		(England) Leeds Carnegie L.F.C.

=== South Korea ===
Head coach: Kim Yong Ho

No.	Pos.	Player	Date of birth (age)	Caps	Club
1	GK	Lee Hyo-ju	4 March 1991 (aged 17)		(South Korea) Incheon Design HS
2	DF	Seo Hyun-sook	6 January 1992 (aged 16)		(South Korea) Dongsan Information Industry HS
3	DF	Lee Eun-kyung	18 March 1991 (aged 17)		(South Korea) Dongsan Information Industry HS
4	MF	Oh Hye-jin	14 March 1991 (aged 17)		(South Korea) Dongsan Information Industry HS
5	DF	Song A-ri	13 August 1991 (aged 17)		(South Korea) Dongsan Information Industry HS
6	MF	Lee Young-ju	22 April 1992 (aged 16)		(South Korea) Dongsan Information Industry HS
7	MF	Mok Hyun-su	8 February 1991 (aged 17)		(South Korea) Hyundai HS
8	DF	Shin Mi-na	3 February 1991 (aged 17)		(South Korea) Dongsan Information Industry HS
9	MF	Lee Hyun-young	16 February 1991 (aged 17)		(South Korea) Dongsan Information Industry HS
10	FW	Ji So-yun	21 February 1991 (aged 17)		(South Korea) Dongsan Information Industry HS
11	FW	Park Hee-young	21 March 1991 (aged 17)		(South Korea) Dongsan Information Industry HS
12	MF	Jeoun Eun-ha	28 January 1993 (aged 15)		(South Korea) Pohang Girls' Electronic HS
13	GK	Lee Han-na	8 November 1991 (aged 16)		(South Korea) Dongsan Information Industry HS
14	MF	Cho Sun-hwa	1 October 1992 (aged 16)		(South Korea) Dongsan Information Industry HS
15	DF	Oh Yu-sun	24 July 1992 (aged 16)		(South Korea) Dongsan Information Industry HS
16	MF	Oh Hye-mi	19 July 1992 (aged 16)		(South Korea) Dongsan Information Industry HS
17	MF	Lee Min-a	8 November 1991 (aged 16)		(South Korea) Pohang Girls' Electronic HS
18	FW	Lee Min-sun	29 June 1991 (aged 17)		(South Korea) Pohang Girls' Electronic HS
19	DF	Kim Jung-in	23 March 1991 (aged 17)		(South Korea) Hyundai HS
20	DF	Koh Kyung-yeon	10 April 1991 (aged 17)		(South Korea) Hwacheon Information Industry HS
21	GK	Jung Bo-ram	22 July 1991 (aged 17)		(South Korea) Janghowon HS

=== Nigeria ===
Head coach: Felix Ibe Ukwu

No.	Pos.	Player	Date of birth (age)	Caps	Club
1	GK	Favour Okeke	27 December 1992 (15)		(Nigeria) Pelican Stars
2	DF	Nina Egeonu	22 December 1992 (15)		(Nigeria) Nitto FC
3	DF	Doris Ewhubare	18 June 1991 (17)		(Nigeria) Pelican Stars
4	MF	Martina Ohadugha	5 May 1991 (17)		(Nigeria) Nasara United
5	DF	Maria Nwoko	3 October 1991 (17)		(Nigeria) Delta Queens
6	DF	Gloria Ofoegbu	3 January 1992 (16)		(Nigeria) Nasara United
7	MF	Eno Umoh	3 May 1992 (16)		(Nigeria) Rivers Angels
8	FW	Ngozi Ebere	5 August 1991 (17)		(Nigeria) Rivers Angels
9	FW	Desire Oparanozie	17 December 1993 (14)		(Nigeria) Bayelsa Queens
10	FW	Amarachi Okoronkwo	12 December 1992 (15)		(Nigeria) Nasara United
11	FW	Amenze Aighewi	21 November 1991 (16)		(Nigeria) Ineeh Queens
12	GK	Marbel Egwuenu	15 December 1992 (16)		(Nigeria) Delta Queens
13	FW	Valentine Ibe	4 October 1992 (15)		(Nigeria) Pelican Stars
14	FW	Soo Adekwagh	15 July 1992 (16)		(Nigeria) Nasara United
15	DF	Helen Ukaonu	17 May 1991 (17)		(Nigeria) Delta Queens
16	DF	Regina Macfancy	24 January 1991 (17)		(Nigeria) Rivers Angels
17	FW	Ebere Orji	23 December 1992 (15)		(Nigeria) Bayelsa Queens
18	DF	Josephine Chukwunonye	19 March 1992 (16)		(Nigeria) Pelican Stars
19	MF	Prudent Ugoh	2 February 1992 (16)		(Nigeria) Rivers Angels
20	MF	Ngozi Okobi	14 December 1993 (14)		(Nigeria) Remo Queens
21	GK	Asebe Adamu	20 April 1994 (14)		
