= 2010 UEFA Women's Under-19 Championship =

2010 УЕФА првенство за жени до 19 години

Tournament details
- Host country: Macedonia
- Dates: 24 May – 5 June
- Teams: 8

Final positions
- Champions: France (2nd title)
- Runners-up: England

Tournament statistics
- Matches played: 15
- Goals scored: 57 (3.8 per match)
- Top scorer(s): (Germany) Turid Knaak (Netherlands) Lieke Martens (4 goals)
- Best player: (North Macedonia) Natasa Andonova

The UEFA Women's U-19 Championship 2010 Final Tournament was held in Macedonia between 24 May and 5 June 2010. Players born after 1 January 1991 were eligible to participate in this competition.

== Qualifications ==
There were two separate rounds of qualifications held before the Final Tournament, beginning with the First qualifying round. The first 44 teams were drawn into 11 groups.

Top two teams from each group and the best third-placed team entered in a Second qualifying round along with Germany who automatically qualified. The 24 teams were drawn into 6 groups.

Then, the group winners and the runners-up team with the best record against the sides first and third in their pool join hosts Macedonia at the Final Tournament.

	Teams entering in this round	Teams advancing from previous round	Competition format
First qualifying round (44 teams)	44 teams from associations ranked 2–53		11 groups of 4 teams, hosted by one club, seeded into four pots by UEFA coefficient
Second qualifying round (24 teams)	Germany (top-seed)	11 group winners and runners-up from 1st qualifying round; best group third-place finisher from 1st qualifying round	6 groups of 4 teams, hosted by one club, seeded into four pots by UEFA coefficient
Final tournament (8 teams)	Macedonia (hosts)	6 group winners from 2nd qualifying round; best group runners-up from 2nd qualifying round	2 groups of 4 teams, semi-finals, final

== Final tournament ==
=== Group stage ===
==== Group A ====
Team	Pld	W	D	L	GF	GA	GD	Pts
Germany	3	3	0	0	11	3	+8	9
England	3	2	0	1	6	4	+2	6
Italy	3	0	1	2	5	9	−4	1
Scotland	3	0	1	2	5	11	−6	1

24 May 2010
13:00 (CEST)

Scotland	1–3	England
Beattie 67'	Report	Duggan 20'; Christiansen 34'; Coombs 72'

Zelezarnica, Skopje
Attendance: 350
Referee: Esther Azzopardi (Malta)

24 May 2010
13:00 (CEST)

Germany	4–1	Italy
Malinowski 15'; Kayikci 25'; Bagehorn 34'; Simon 47'	Report	Mason 59'

Milano Arena, Kumanovo
Attendance: 1,800
Referee: Rhona Daly (Ireland)

27 May 2010
17:00 (CEST)

Scotland	1–5	Germany
Dempster 66'	Report	Knaak 45+2', 69', 90+1'; Kleiner 25' (pen.); Doppler 90+2'

Boris Trajkovski Stadium, Skopje
Attendance: 300
Referee: Sofia Karagiorgi (Cyprus)

27 May 2010
17:00 (CEST)

England	2–1	Italy
Duggan 87'; Bruton 90+1'	Report	Vitale 6'

Milano Arena, Kumanovo
Attendance: 3,000
Referee: Petra Chuda (Slovakia)

30 May 2010
17:00 (CEST)

Italy	3–3	Scotland
Bonansea 17'; Franco 22'; Vitale 27'	Report	Ewens 20'; Dempster 64', 73'

Boris Trajkovski Stadium, Skopje
Attendance: 400
Referee: Esther Azzopardi (Malta)

30 May 2010
17:00 (CEST)

England	1–2	Germany
Bruton 45+1'	Report	Doppler 12'; Knaak 40'

National Arena Philip II, Skopje
Attendance: 250
Referee: Katalin Kulcsar (Hungary)

==== Group B ====
Team	Pld	W	D	L	GF	GA	GD	Pts
Netherlands	3	3	0	0	11	0	+11	9
France	3	2	0	1	7	3	+4	6
Spain	3	1	0	2	6	3	+3	3
Macedonia	3	0	0	3	1	19	−18	0

24 May 2010
17:00 (CEST)

Macedonia	0–6	Spain
	Report	Galan 38' del Rio 53'; Ferez 81'; Losada 85'; Buceta 87'; Beristain 90+2'

National Arena Philip II, Skopje
Attendance: 8,000
Referee: Karolina Radzik-Johan (Poland)

24 May 2010
13:00 (CEST)

Netherlands	2–0	France
Van Dongen 8'; Martens 35'	Report

Boris Trajkovski Stadium, Skopje
Attendance: 300
Referee: Sofia Karagiorgi (Cyprus)

27 May 2010
17:00 (CEST)

Macedonia	0–7	Netherlands
	Report	Martens 1', 66'; Lewerissa 10', 45'; Koopmans 23', 56'; Van de Wetering 79'

Zelezarnica, Skopje
Attendance: 550
Referee: Rhona Daly (Ireland)

27 May 2010
17:00 (CEST)

Spain	0–1	France
	Report	Le Garrec 69'

National Arena Philip II, Skopje
Attendance: 200
Referee: Katalin Kulcsar (Hungary)

30 May 2010
17:00 (CEST)

France	6–1	Macedonia
Makanza 12', 40'; Catala 14'; Barbetta 15', 88'; Le Garrec 72'	Report	N. Andonova 66'

Milano Arena, Kumanovo
Attendance: 2,900
Referee: Petra Chuda (Slovakia)

30 May 2010
17:00 (CEST)

Spain	0–2	Netherlands
	Report	Van Dongen 37'; Martens 39'

Zelezarnica, Skopje
Attendance: 500
Referee: Karolina Radzik-Johan (Poland)

=== Knockout stage ===
Semi-finals
Germany	1(3)
France	1(5)
Netherlands	0(4)
England	0(5)

Final
France	2
England	1

==== Semifinals ====
June 2, 2010
17:00 (CEST)

Germany	1–1 (a.e.t.)	France
Malinowski 37'	Report	Barbance 28'
Penalties
Bagehorn (penalty scored); Kleiner (penalty missed); Elsig (penalty scored); Beckmann (penalty scored)	3–5	(penalty scored) Torrent; (penalty scored) Catala; (penalty scored) Le Garrec; (penalty scored) Rubio; (penalty scored) Crammer

Milano Arena, Kumanovo
Attendance: 3,000
Referee: Esther Azzopardi (Malta)

2 June 2010
17:00 (CEST)

Netherlands	0–0 (a.e.t.)	England
	Report
Penalties
Jansen (penalty scored); Worm (penalty missed); Martens (penalty scored); Van Dongen (penalty scored); Van der Gragt (penalty scored)	4–5	(penalty scored) Nobbs; (penalty scored) Christiansen; (penalty scored) Holbrook; (penalty scored) Bonner; (penalty scored) Flaherty

National Arena Philip II, Skopje
Attendance: 300
Referee: Katalin Kulcsár (Hungary)

==== Final ====
June 5, 2010
15:00 (CEST)

France	2–1	England
Lavaud 29'; Crammer 55'	Report	Holbrook 25'

National Arena Philip II, Skopje
Attendance: 4,000
Referee: Karolina Radzik-Johan (Poland)

France	England

GK	16	Laëtitia Philippe
DF	14	Inès Jaurena
DF	4	Kelly Gadéa (c)
DF	5	Adeline Rousseau
DF	3	Caroline La Villa
MF	10	Solène Barbance	(substituted off) 59'
MF	6	Léa Rubio
MF	15	Amélie Barbetta
FW	7	Marina Makanza	(substituted off) 59'
FW	9	Pauline Crammer	(substituted off) 80'
FW	17	Rose Lavaud
Substitutes:
DF	2	Anaïg Butel	(substituted on) 59'
MF	11	Léa Le Garrec	(substituted on) 59'
FW	8	Camille Catala	(substituted on) 80'
Manager:
(France) Jean-Michel Degrange

GK	1	Rebecca Spencer
DF	2	Lyndsey Cunningham
DF	5	Lucy Bronze
DF	6	Gemma Bonner
DF	3	Gilly Flaherty (c)	(substituted off) 62'
MF	4	Abbie Prosser
MF	7	Isobel Christiansen	(substituted off) 77'
MF	10	Jessica Holbrook
MF	8	Jordan Nobbs
FW	11	Demi Stokes
FW	9	Toni Duggan
Substitutes:
FW	18	Rebecca Jane	(substituted on) 62'
FW	17	Lauren Bruton	(substituted on) 77'
Manager:
(England) Maureen Marley

Match officials

- Assistant referees:
  - Petruta Iugulescu (Romania)
  - Monica Lokkeberg (Norway)
- Fourth official: Rhona Daly (Ireland)

== Awards ==
2010 UEFA Women's U-19 European champions

France
Second title

== Goal scorers ==
4 goals

- (Germany) Turid Knaak
- (Netherlands) Lieke Martens

3 goals

- (Scotland) Rebecca Dempster

2 goals

- (England) Lauren Bruton
- (England) Toni Duggan
- (France) Amélie Barbetta
- (France) Léa Le Garrec
- (France) Marina Makanza
- (Germany) Annika Doppler
- (Germany) Kyra Malinowski
- (Italy) Francesca Vitale
- (Netherlands) Merel van Dongen
- (Netherlands) Kirsten Koopmans
- (Netherlands) Vanity Lewerissa

1 goal

- (England) Isobel Christiansen
- (England) Laura Coombs
- (England) Jessica Holbrook
- (France) Solène Barbance
- (France) Camille Catala
- (France) Pauline Crammer
- (France) Rose Lavaud
- (Germany) Marie-Louise Bagehorn
- (Germany) Hasret Kayikci
- (Germany) Valeria Kleiner
- (Germany) Carolin Simon
- (Italy) Barbara Bonansea
- (Italy) Michela Franco
- (Italy) Marta Mason
- (North Macedonia) Natasa Andonova
- (Netherlands) Mauri van de Wetering
- (Scotland) Jen Beattie
- (Scotland) Sarah Ewens
- (Spain) Naiara Beristain
- (Spain) Ana Buceta
- (Spain) Carolina Ferez
- (Spain) Maria Galan
- (Spain) Maria Victoria Losada
- (Spain) Irene del Rio
