= 2008 FIFA U-17 Women's World Cup =

First women's football U-17 World Cup in FIFA history

2008 FIFA I Raro I Te 17 Kapu Wahine O Te Ao
- FIFA U-17 WWC official logo

Tournament details
- Host country: New Zealand
- Dates: 28 October – 16 November
- Teams: 16
- Venues: 4 (in 4 host cities)

Final positions
- Champions: North Korea (1st title)
- Runners-up: United States
- Third place: Germany
- Fourth place: England

Tournament statistics
- Matches played: 32
- Goals scored: 113 (3.53 per match)
- Attendance: 207,803 (6,494 per match)
- Top scorer(s): (Germany) Dzsenifer Marozsán (6 goals)
- Best player: (Japan) Mana Iwabuchi
- Best goalkeeper: (United States) Taylor Vancil
- Fair play award: Germany

The 2008 FIFA U-17 Women's World Cup was the first women's football edition of the U-17 World Cup. It was held in New Zealand from 28 October to 16 November 2008. North Korea won the first edition, extending their grip of women's youth football having won the then-most recent U-20 Women's World Cup.

== Host cities ==

Matches were played in four New Zealand cities:

- The Auckland conurbation, New Zealand's largest metropolitan area, hosted the final and 3rd place playoff. The designated host stadium is located in North Shore City.
- Hamilton hosted two of the quarter-finals.
- Wellington, New Zealand's capital city, hosted two of the quarter-finals.
- Christchurch, the only host city in the South Island, hosted the semi-finals.

Pool matches were spread evenly among these cities. The host nation, New Zealand, was based mostly in Auckland but played one pool match in Wellington.

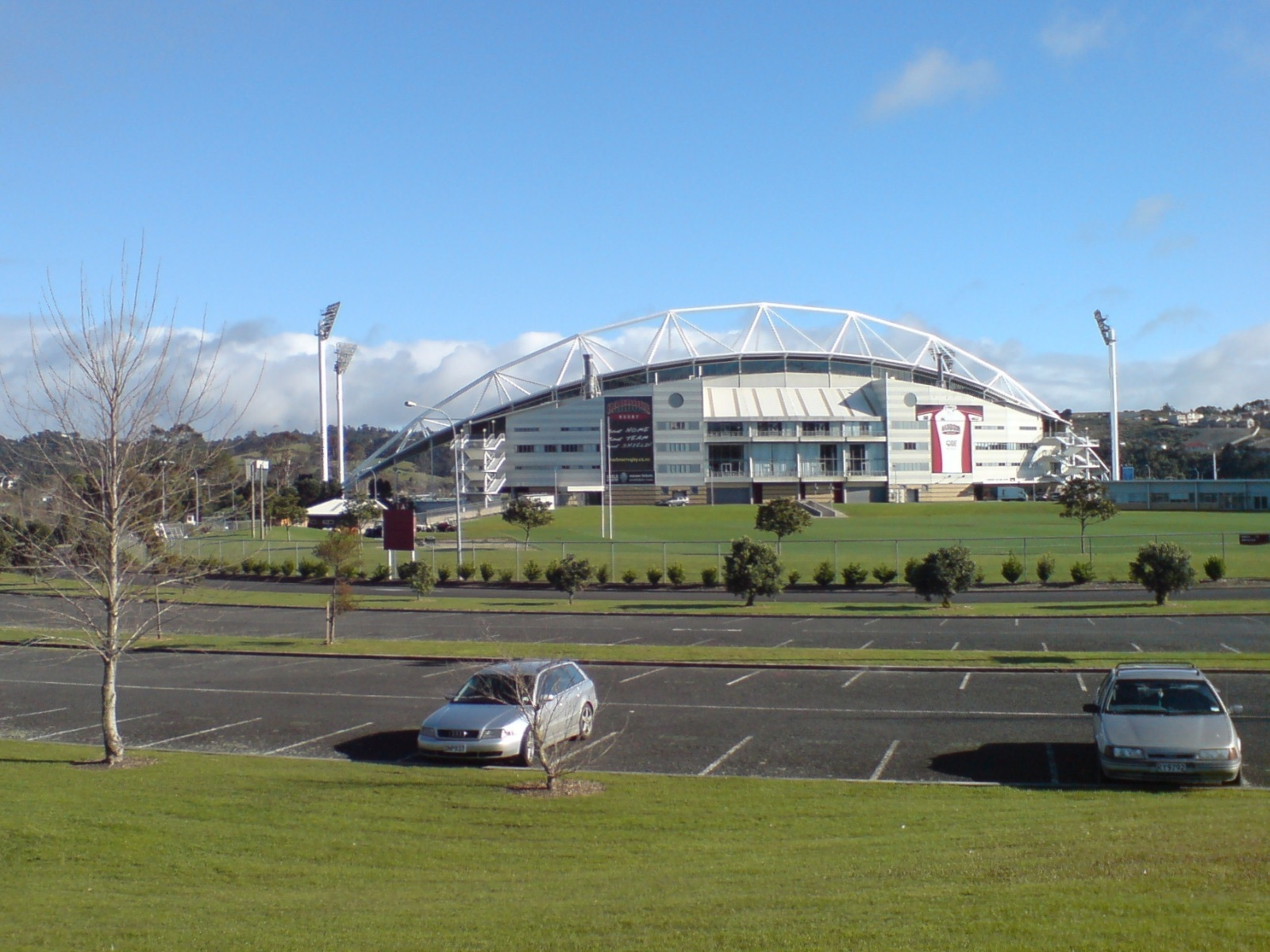
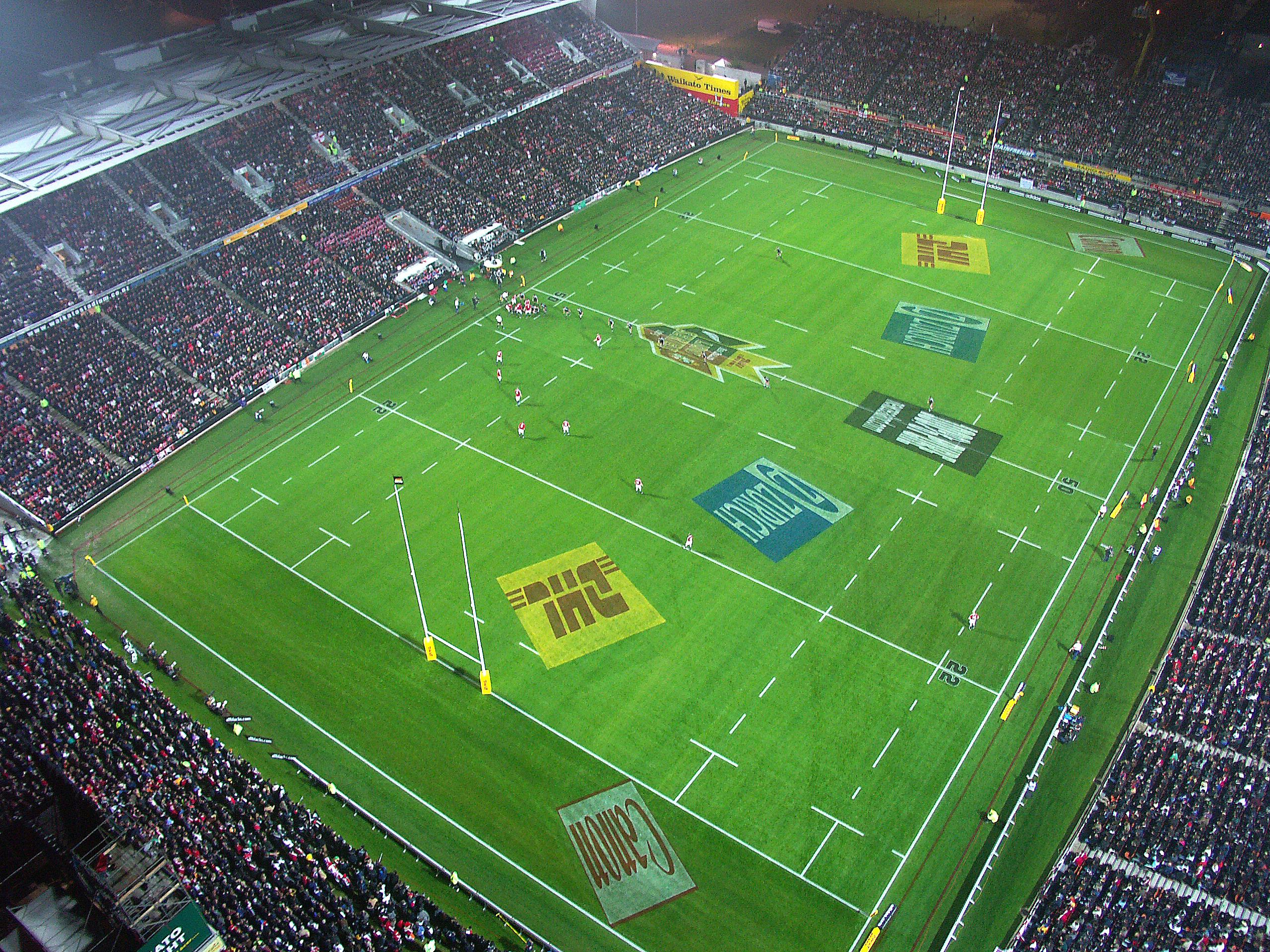
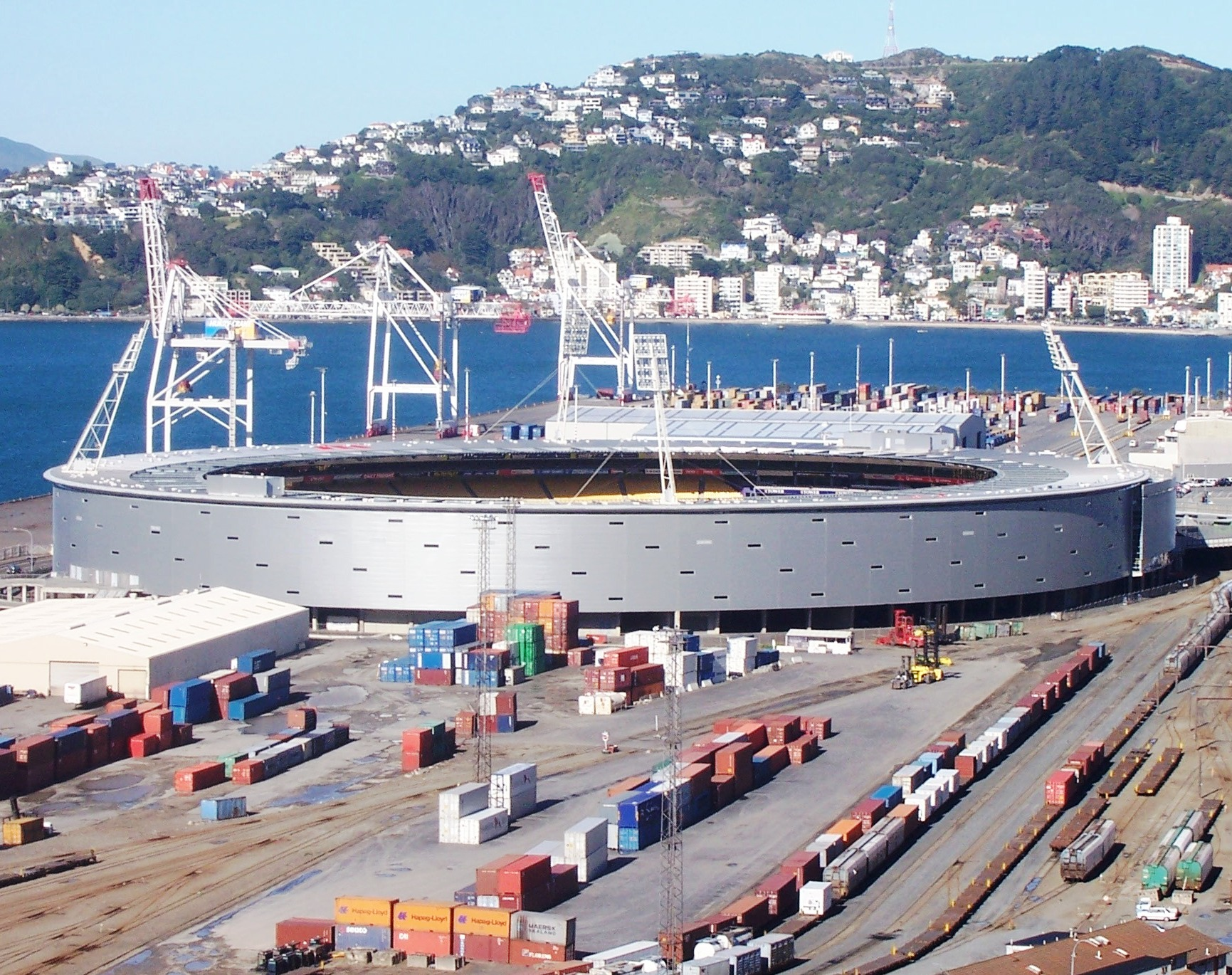
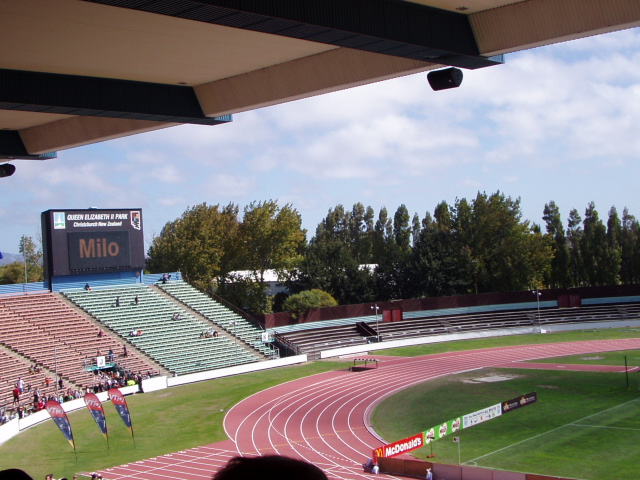
North Harbour Stadium

Location: Auckland (North Shore City)
Capacity: 25,000

Waikato Stadium

Location: Hamilton
Capacity: 26,500

Wellington Stadium
(Westpac Stadium)

Location: Wellington
Capacity: 36,500

Queen Elizabeth II Park

Location: Christchurch
Capacity: 20,000

== Qualified teams ==
Confederation (Continent)	Qualifying Tournament	Qualifier(s)
AFC (Asia)	2007 AFC U-16 Women's Championship	North Korea; Japan; South Korea
CAF (Africa)	2008 African U-17 Women's Championship	Nigeria; Ghana
CONCACAF (North, Central America & Caribbean)	2008 CONCACAF Women's U-17 Championship	United States; Costa Rica; Canada
CONMEBOL (South America)	2008 South American Under-17 Women's Championship	Colombia; Brazil; Paraguay
OFC (Oceania)	Host nation	New Zealand
UEFA (Europe)	2008 UEFA Women's Under-17 Championship	Germany; France; Denmark; England

== Tournament ==
=== Group stage ===
All times local (UTC+13)

==== Group A ====
Pos	Team	Pld	W	D	L	GF	GA	GD	Pts	Qualification
1	Denmark	3	1	2	0	3	2	+1	5	Knockout stage
2	Canada	3	1	2	0	2	1	+1	5	Knockout stage
3	New Zealand	3	1	0	2	4	4	0	3	
4	Colombia	3	0	2	1	3	5	−2	2	

29 October 2008
12:00

Denmark	1–1	Colombia
Boye 51'	Report	Ariza 20'

North Harbour Stadium, Auckland
Attendance: 6,759
Referee: Cha Sung-mi (South Korea)
28 October 2008
19:00

New Zealand	0–1	Canada
	Report	Lamarre 53'

North Harbour Stadium, Auckland
Attendance: 13,123
Referee: Kirsi Savolainen (Finland)

1 November 2008
13:00

Colombia	1–1	Canada
Vidal 10'	Report	Ezurike 9'

North Harbour Stadium, Auckland
Attendance: 11,170
Referee: Wang Jia (China PR)
1 November 2008
16:00

New Zealand	1–2	Denmark
Longo 13'	Report	Andreasen 29'; Olsen 56'

North Harbour Stadium, Auckland
Attendance: 11,170
Referee: Silvia Reyes (Peru)

4 November 2008
19:00

Colombia	1–3	New Zealand
Ariza 82'	Report	White 44', 81', 87'

Wellington Stadium, Wellington
Attendance: 3,546
Referee: Etsuko Fukano (Japan)
4 November 2008
19:00

Canada	0–0	Denmark
	Report

Waikato Stadium, Hamilton
Attendance: 3,283
Referee: Finau Vulivuli (Fiji)

==== Group B ====
Pos	Team	Pld	W	D	L	GF	GA	GD	Pts	Qualification
1	Germany	3	2	1	0	9	3	+6	7	Knockout stage
2	North Korea	3	1	2	0	4	3	+1	5	Knockout stage
3	Ghana	3	1	1	1	4	4	0	4	
4	Costa Rica	3	0	0	3	1	8	−7	0	

29 October 2008
12:00

Costa Rica	0–5	Germany
	Report	Mester 17'; Marozsán 34', 43'; Knaak 51'; Kemme 66'

Queen Elizabeth II Park, Christchurch
Attendance: 4,105
Referee: Etsuko Fukano (Japan)
29 October 2008
15:00

North Korea	1–1	Ghana
Ho Un-byol 69'	Report	Dadson 73'

Queen Elizabeth II Park, Christchurch
Attendance: 4,105
Referee: Natalia Avdonchenko (Russia)

1 November 2008
13:00

Ghana	2–3	Germany
Dadson 65'; Fordjour 86'	Report	Marozsán 5' (pen.), 35'; Maier 69'

Queen Elizabeth II Park, Christchurch
Attendance: 4,272
Referee: Kirsi Savolainen (Finland)
1 November 2008
16:00

Costa Rica	1–2	North Korea
Rodríguez Cedeño 20'	Report	Yun Hyon-hi 16', 65'

Queen Elizabeth II Park, Christchurch
Attendance: 4,272
Referee: Cristina Dorcioman (Romania)

4 November 2008
16:00

Ghana	1–0	Costa Rica
Afriyie 19'	Report

Wellington Stadium, Wellington
Attendance: 3,546
Referee: Cha Sung-mi (South Korea)
4 November 2008
16:00

Germany	1–1	North Korea
Popp 3'	Report	Jon Myong-hwa 58'

Waikato Stadium, Hamilton
Attendance: 3,283
Referee: Michelle Pye (Canada)

==== Group C ====
Pos	Team	Pld	W	D	L	GF	GA	GD	Pts	Qualification
1	Japan	3	3	0	0	17	5	+12	9	Knockout stage
2	United States	3	1	1	1	6	5	+1	4	Knockout stage
3	France	3	1	1	1	8	10	−2	4	
4	Paraguay	3	0	0	3	5	16	−11	0	

30 October 2008
12:00

Japan	3–2	United States
Iwabuchi 31'; Kameoka 68'; Yoshioka 74'	Report	DiMartino 3'; K. Mewis 51'

Waikato Stadium, Hamilton
Attendance: 4,816
Referee: Thalia Mitsi (Greece)
30 October 2008
15:00

France	6–2	Paraguay
Crammer 5', 12', 61' (pen.); Charlotte Poulain 17'; Augis 58'; Catala 86'	Report	J. González 45+3'; Genes 90+2'

Waikato Stadium, Hamilton
Attendance: 5,016
Referee: Pannipar Kamnueng (Thailand)

2 November 2008
13:00

Paraguay	1–3	United States
Fernández 32'	Report	Flores 48' (o.g.); DiMartino 77'; Verloo 83'

Waikato Stadium, Hamilton
Attendance: 4,115
Referee: Thalia Mitsi (Greece)
2 November 2008
16:00

Japan	7–1	France
Inoue 11'; Kishikawa 21' (pen.), 57'; Kira 26', 27', 34'; Shimada 38'	Report	Augis 16'

Waikato Stadium, Hamilton
Attendance: 4,115
Referee: Quetzalli Alvarado (Mexico)

5 November 2008
16:00

Paraguay	2–7	Japan
J. González 20' (pen.); Villamayor 55'	Report	Kishikawa 36', 73'; Ohshima 40'; Hamada 43', 52'; Takahashi 83', 89'

Queen Elizabeth II Park, Christchurch
Attendance: 3,920
Referee: Cristina Dorcioman (Romania)
5 November 2008
16:00

United States	1–1	France
DiMartino 57'	Report	Rubio 72'

North Harbour Stadium, Auckland
Attendance: 1,410
Referee: Silvia Reyes (Peru)

==== Group D ====
Pos	Team	Pld	W	D	L	GF	GA	GD	Pts	Qualification
1	South Korea	3	2	0	1	6	3	+3	6	Knockout stage
2	England	3	2	0	1	4	3	+1	6	Knockout stage
3	Nigeria	3	1	1	1	4	4	0	4	
4	Brazil	3	0	1	2	3	7	−4	1	

30 October 2008
12:00

Brazil	0–3	England
	Report	Carter 71', 89'; Bruton 75'

Wellington Stadium, Wellington
Attendance: 10,795
Referee: Michelle Pye (Canada)
30 October 2008
15:00

South Korea	1–2	Nigeria
Ji So-yun 85'	Report	Adekwagh 1'; Aighewi 60'

Wellington Stadium, Wellington
Attendance: 11,500
Referee: Finau Vulivuli (Fiji)

2 November 2008
13:00

Nigeria	0–1	England
	Report	Holbrook 79'

Wellington Stadium, Wellington
Attendance: 6,471
Referee: Etsuko Fukano (Japan)
2 November 2008
16:00

Brazil	1–2	South Korea
Raquel 66'	Report	Lee Min-sun 47'; Lee Hyun-young 57'

Wellington Stadium, Wellington
Attendance: 6,471
Referee: Damgoua Neguel (Cameroon)

5 November 2008
19:00

Nigeria	2–2	Brazil
Orji 43'; Okoronkwo 75'	Report	Ketlen 35'; Rafaelle 71'

Queen Elizabeth II Park, Christchurch
Attendance: 1,410
Referee: Natalia Avdonchenko (Russia)
5 November 2008
19:00

England	0–3	South Korea
	Report	Ji So-yun 8'; Koh Kyung-yeon 16'; Song Ah-ri 71'

North Harbour Stadium, Auckland
Attendance: 3,920
Referee: Damgoua Neguel (Cameroon)

=== Knockout stage ===
All times local (UTC+13)

Quarter-finals
8 November – Wellington
Denmark	0
North Korea	4
9 November – Hamilton
Japan	2 (4)
England (p)	2 (5)
8 November – Wellington
Germany	3
Canada	1
9 November – Hamilton
South Korea	2
United States	4

Semi-finals
13 November – Christchurch
North Korea	2
England	1
13 November – Christchurch
Germany	1
United States	2

Final
16 November – Auckland
North Korea (a.e.t.)	2
United States	1
Third place
16 November – Auckland
England	0
Germany	3

==== Quarterfinals ====
8 November 2008
13:00

Denmark	0–4	North Korea
	Report	Jon Myong-hwa 21', 73'; Ri Un-ae 86'; Kim Un-ju 89'

Wellington Stadium, Wellington
Attendance: 4,182
Referee: Thalia Mitsi (Greece)
8 November 2008
16:00

Germany	3–1	Canada
Marozsán 4', 78'; Mester 34'	Report	Ezurike 44'

Wellington Stadium, Wellington
Attendance: 4,182
Referee: Silvia Reyes (Peru)

9 November 2008
13:00

Japan	2–2 (a.e.t.)	England
Kira 8'; Iwabuchi 82'	Report	Staniforth 45+1'; Christiansen 90+1'
Penalties
Kira (penalty scored); Takeyama (penalty scored); Kameoka (penalty missed); Kishikawa (penalty scored); Saitō (penalty scored)	4–5	(penalty scored) Nobbs; (penalty scored) Bruton; (penalty scored) Carter; (penalty scored) Pitman; (penalty scored) Bonner

Waikato Stadium, Hamilton
Attendance: 7,247
Referee: Quetzalli Alvarado (Mexico)
9 November 2008
16:00

South Korea	2–4	United States
Lee Hyun-young 65', 85'	Report	Verloo 27', 78'; K. Mewis 54'; DiMartino 84'

Waikato Stadium, Hamilton
Attendance: 7,247
Referee: Kirsi Savolainen (Finland)

==== Semifinals ====
13 November 2008
16:00

North Korea	2–1	England
Ho Un-byol 19'; Jon Myong-hwa 44'	Report	Sutton 75'

Queen Elizabeth II Park, Christchurch
Attendance: 8,014
Referee: Michelle Pye (Canada)

13 November 2008
19:00

Germany	1–2	United States
Popp 6'	Report	DiMartino 63'; Verloo 81'

Queen Elizabeth II Park, Christchurch
Attendance: 8,014
Referee: Cha Sung-mi (South Korea)

==== 3rd Place Playoff ====
16 November 2008
13:00

England	0–3	Germany
	Report	Wesely 11'; Knaak 74'; Mester 88'

North Harbour Stadium, Auckland
Attendance: 16,162
Referee: Natalia Avdonchenko (Russia)

==== Final ====
16 November 2008
16:00

North Korea	2–1 (a.e.t.)	United States
Kim Un-hyang 77'; Jang Hyon-sun 113'	Report	Hong Myong-hui 2' (o.g.)

North Harbour Stadium, Auckland
Attendance: 16,162
Referee: Silvia Reyes (Peru)

== Winners ==
2008 FIFA U-17 Women's World Cup winners

North Korea
First title

== Awards ==
Golden Ball	Silver Ball	Bronze Ball
(Japan) Mana Iwabuchi	(Germany) Dzsenifer Marozsán	(United States) Kristie Mewis

Golden Shoe	Silver Shoe	Bronze Shoe
(Germany) Dzsenifer Marozsán	(United States) Vicki DiMartino	(North Korea) Jon Myong-hwa

FIFA Fair Play Award	Golden Glove
Germany	(United States) Taylor Vancil

== Goalscorers ==
Dzsenifer Marozsán of Germany won the Golden Shoe award for scoring six goals. In total, 113 goals were scored by 69 different players, with two of them credited as own goals.

6 goals

- (Germany) Dzsenifer Marozsán

5 goals

- (United States) Vicki DiMartino

4 goals

- (Japan) Chinatsu Kira
- (Japan) Natsuki Kishikawa
- (North Korea) Jon Myong-hwa
- (United States) Courtney Verloo

3 goals

- (France) Pauline Crammer
- (Germany) Lynn Mester
- (New Zealand) Rosie White
- (North Korea) Ho Un-byol
- (South Korea) Lee Hyun-young

2 goals

- (Canada) Nkem Ezurike
- (Colombia) Tatiana Ariza
- (England) Danielle Carter
- (France) Marine Augis
- (Germany) Alexandra Popp
- (Germany) Turid Knaak
- (Japan) Haruka Hamada
- (Japan) Mana Iwabuchi
- (Japan) Saori Takahashi
- (North Korea) Yun Hyon-hi
- (Paraguay) Jacqueline Gonzalez
- (South Korea) Ji So-yun
- (United States) Kristie Mewis

1 goal

- (Brazil) Ketlen Wiggers
- (Brazil) Raquel Fernandez
- (Brazil) Rafaelle Souza
- (Canada) Rachel Lamarre
- (Colombia) Ingrid Vidal
- (Costa Rica) Raquel Rodríguez
- (Denmark) Britta Olsen
- (Denmark) Linette Andreasen
- (Denmark) Simone Boye
- (England) Isobel Christiansen
- (England) Jessica Holbrook
- (England) Lauren Bruton
- (England) Lucy Staniforth
- (England) Rebecca Jane
- (France) Camille Catala
- (France) Charlotte Poulain
- (France) Lea Rubio
- (Germany) Inka Wesely
- (Germany) Leonie Maier
- (Germany) Tabea Kemme
- (Ghana) Deborah Afriyie
- (Ghana) Florence Dadson
- (Ghana) Isha Fordjour
- (Japan) Chiaki Shimada
- (Japan) Kei Yoshioka
- (Japan) Marika Ohshima
- (Japan) Natsumi Kameoka
- (Japan) Yuiko Inoue
- (New Zealand) Annalie Longo
- (Nigeria) Amarachi Okoronkwo
- (Nigeria) Amenze Aighewi
- (Nigeria) Ebere Orji
- (Nigeria) Soo Adekwagh
- (North Korea) Jang Hyon-sun
- (North Korea) Kim Un-hyang
- (North Korea) Kim Un-ju
- (North Korea) Ri Un-ae
- (Paraguay) Gloria Villamayor
- (Paraguay) Paola Genes
- (Paraguay) Rebeca Fernández
- (South Korea) Go Kyung-yeon
- (South Korea) Lee Min-sun
- (South Korea) Song Ah-ri

Own goal

- (North Korea) Hong Myong-hui (playing against the United States)
- (Paraguay) Cris Mabel Flores (playing against the United States)
