= Rebecca Dempster =

Scottish footballer (born 1991)

Personal information
- Full name: Rebecca Eileen Dempster
- Date of birth: 10 February 1991 (age 35)
- Position: Forward

Team information
- Current team: Fimauto Valpolicella

Senior career*
Years	Team	Apps	(Gls)
2008	Inverness City Ladies		
2009	Celtic Women		
2010	Forfar Farmington		
2011	Hibernian Ladies	17	(10)
2012–2013	Aberdeen Ladies	33	(11)
2016–	Fimauto Valpolicella		

International career^{‡}
2007–2009	Scotland U17	4	(0)
2009–2010	Scotland U19	11	(12)
2011–2012	Scotland	3	(0)
- * Club domestic league appearances and goals as of 17 May 2017 ‡ National team caps and goals as of 19:52, 15 May 2017 (UTC)

Rebecca Eileen Dempster (born 10 February 1991) is a Scottish footballer who plays as a forward for Italian club Fimauto Valpolicella. She has made three appearances for the Scotland national team.

== Early life ==
Dempster grew up in Ellon, Aberdeenshire, and was educated at Ellon Academy.

== Playing career ==
=== Club ===
Dempster played for Inverness City before joining Celtic in 2009. After a spell with Forfar Farmington, she joined Hibernian ahead of the 2011 season. on 25 May 2011, she was part of the Hibernian team that won the Scottish Women's Premier League Cup, beating Spartans 5–2 in the final.

In 2012, Dempster joined Aberdeen, where she played for three seasons. She then spent a year out of official football before signing for Fimauto Valpolicella in Italy in 2016. In her first season, Valpolicella won promotion from Serie B.

=== International ===
Dempster made her debut for the Scotland under-17 team against Sweden in September 2007, going on to make four appearances at that level. She then progressed to the under-19 squad, where she scored twelve goals in eleven appearances, including a hat-trick in a 5–1 win against Bulgaria in September 2009. At the 2010 European Championships, she scored three times in three matches.

Dempster was given her first call-up to the full Scotland squad in 2010. She won her first international cap in a friendly match against France on 18 May 2011. She made further appearances against Northern Ireland and Cameroon in 2012.

== Honours ==
=== Club ===
Hibernian:

- Scottish Women's Premier League Cup: 2011

Fimauto Valpolicella:

- Serie B Group C: 2016–17
