= Hannah Wall =

New Zealand footballer

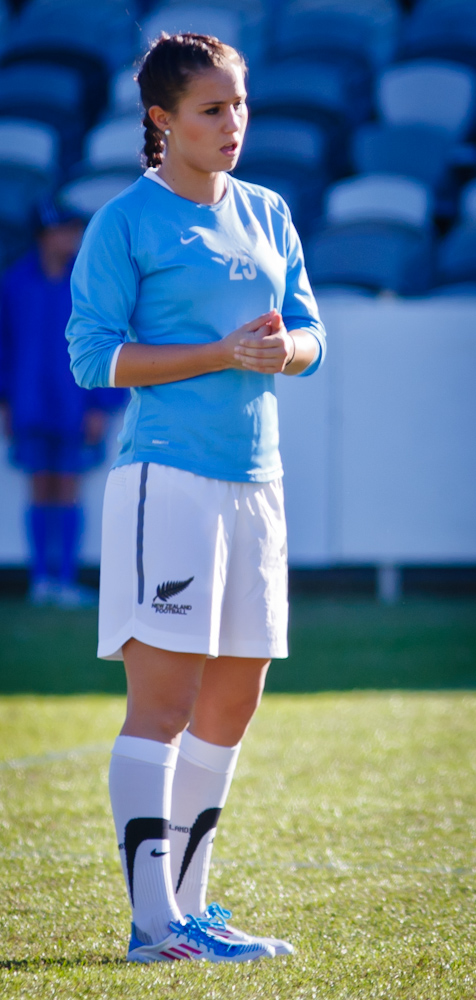

Personal information
- Full name: Hannah Rachael Wall
- Date of birth: 3 May 1991 (age 35)
- Place of birth: Wellington, New Zealand
- Height: 1.66 m (5 ft 5 in)
- Position: Striker

International career^{‡}
Years	Team	Apps	(Gls)
2008	New Zealand U-17		
2008–2010	New Zealand U-20	14	(2)
2009–	New Zealand	11	(2)
- ‡ National team caps and goals as of 13 May 2011

Hannah Rachael Wall (born 3 May 1991) is an association football player who represented New Zealand at the FIFA U-17 Women's World Cup, FIFA U-20 Women's World Cup and at full New Zealand international level.

== International career ==
She was a member of the New Zealand squad in the inaugural FIFA U-17 Women's World Cup held in New Zealand in 2007, and played in all three group games against Canada, Denmark and also the 3–1 victory over Colombia.

Wall also represented New Zealand at the 2008 FIFA U-20 Women's World Cup in Chile, again playing all three group games; a 2–3 loss to Nigeria, a 4–3 win over hosts Chile, and a 1–1 draw with England. In 2010, she represented New Zealand at the 2010 FIFA U-20 Women's World Cup, appearing in all three group games.

Wall made her senior Football Ferns debut in a 0–6 loss to China on 10 January 2009.
