= Cha Sung-mi =

South Korean football referee (born 1975)

Personal information
- Full name: Cha Sung-mi
- Date of birth: 23 November 1975 (age 50)
- Place of birth: Seoul, South Korea
- Height: 1.63 m (5 ft 4 in)
- Position: Striker

Senior career*
Years	Team	Apps	(Gls)
1996-2003	INI Steel		
2006	Ilhwa Chunma		

International career
1992-2003	South Korea	57	(30)
- * Club domestic league appearances and goals

Cha Sung-mi (Korean: 차성미, born 23 November 1975) is a South Korean football referee and former footballer who played as a striker for INI Steel and the South Korea national team. Having played for the national team throughout the 1990s, Cha is one of the first generation of women's footballers in South Korea, and is considered as one of the country's greatest ever female strikers.

== Early life ==
Cha was born in Seoul, but moved to Osan with her mother and younger brother after her father died when she was two years old. Her mother ran a local restaurant. While attending Osan Girls' Middle School, Cha competed as a javelin thrower, but in her first year of high school a P.E. teacher suggested she try football, and she began playing for the national team less than a year later. She continued playing at Ulsan College.

== Club career ==
Cha joined Hyundai Steel (later INI Steel), at the time the only women's works football team in South Korea, in 1996. She was the top scorer in the Women's Korean League in all of her first three years at the club. In the first edition of the 1999 tournament, Cha netted ten goals in Incheon's three matches.

A knee injury forced Cha into early retirement, and a retirement ceremony was held for her at the 2003 National Sports Festival. However, after a successful rehabilitation and working as a referee for two years, she returned to playing, joining Chungnam Ilhwa Chunma in 2006. Cha became a core squad member at the newly established club, but struggled with injury and ultimately retired from football at the end of 2006.

== International career ==
Cha was first called up to play for South Korea in 1992 and was considered the team's best striker throughout the 1990s. At the 1999 AFC Women's Championship, she became the first ever Korean player to score two hat-tricks in the same tournament.

Cha played at the 2002 Asian Games in Busan, scoring a goal in South Korea's opening match against Vietnam. She was part of the South Korean squad that finished in third at the 2003 AFC Women's Championship, earning the country its first ever appearance at a FIFA Women's World Cup.

She retired from international football in 2003, and later expressed regret that she never had the opportunity to play in the World Cup. Cha held the record as South Korea's top international goalscorer until 2014, when her total of 30 goals was surpassed by Ji So-yun.

== Refereeing career ==
Even during her playing days, Cha had the ambition to become a referee. She first trained as a referee in 2004, after a knee injury cut her playing career short. After a brief return to football, Cha retired from playing and received her FIFA badge in late 2006, becoming the second female Korean former footballer to qualify as an international referee after Im Eun-ju.

In 2007, Cha refereed at the 2007 AFC U-16 Women's Championship, where she oversaw three matches including the final. Later that year, Cha was the first female referee to officiate in an AFC men's tournament when she oversaw three matches in the qualification stages of the 2008 AFC U-16 Championship. Cha was later selected for the 2008 FIFA U-17 Women's World Cup, where she refereed the semi-final between Germany and the U.S.A., with both assistant referees also hailing from South Korea.

Cha won a scholarship to study in the United States for a year to improve her English skills and subsequently scored full marks in the English test during the referee selection process for the 2011 FIFA Women's World Cup. Cha was one of two Korean match officials at the tournament, along with assistant referee Kim Kyoung-min.

== Style of play ==
Known from a young age for her goalscoring ability, Cha has been called the 'Korean Mia Hamm' and the 'female Cha Bum-kun'. Ahn Jong-goan, her manager at INI Steel, noted that Cha had excellent basic skills as well as physical strength and footballing intelligence, comparing her to Lee Dong-gook and Sun Wen.

== Honours ==
=== INI Steel ===
- Queen's Cup
  - Winners: 1998, 1999, 2000, 2003
  - Runners-up: 1997, 2001
- President's Cup
  - Winners: 1998, 1999, 2001, 2002
  - Runners-up: 2000
- Korea Expressway Corporation National Women's Football Tournament
  - Winners: 1996, 1998, 1999, 2000, 2001
  - Runners-up: 1997, 2002
- Korea Women's League
  - Winners: 1998-2, 1999-1, 1999-2, 2003-1
  - Runners-up: 1998-1, 2000-1, 2001, 2002-1, 2002-2
- Unification Cup
  - Winners: 2002, 2003
- National Sports Festival
  - Winners: 2001, 2002, 2003

=== Individual ===
- Korean women's football MVP: 1996
- Korea Women's League top goalscorer: 1997,1998, 1999
