= Valeria Kleiner =

German footballer

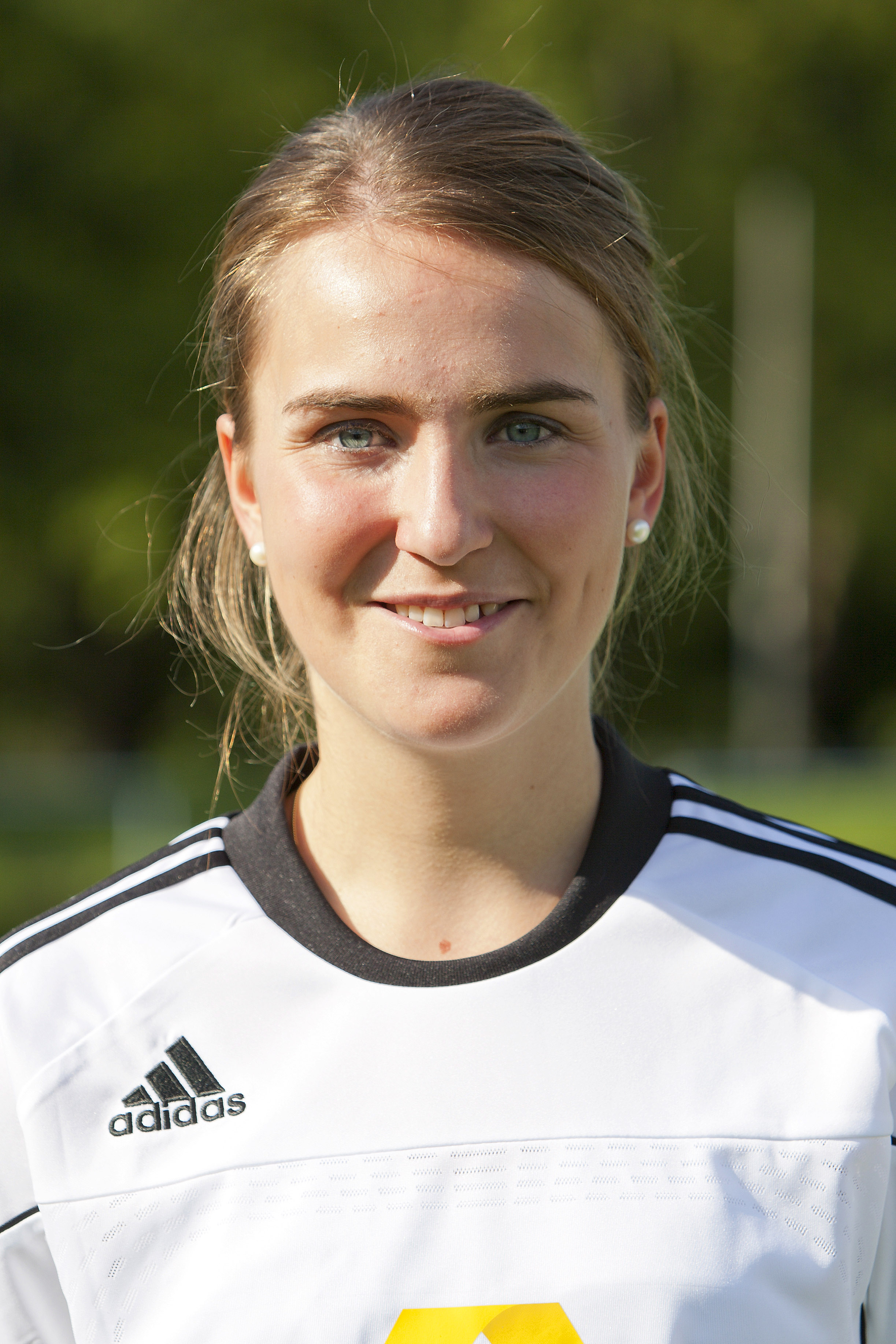
- Valeria Kleiner, August 2011

Personal information
- Full name: Valeria Katharina Kleiner
- Date of birth: 27 March 1991 (age 35)
- Place of birth: Lindau, Germany
- Height: 1.79 m (5 ft 10 1/2 in)
- Position: Defender

Team information
- Current team: Bayer Leverkusen
- Number: 6

Youth career
- 1998–2003: TSV Oberreitnau
- 2003–2006: FC Wangen
- 2006–2007: VfB Friedrichshafen

Senior career*
Years	Team	Apps	(Gls)
2007–2010	SC Freiburg	46	(1)
2010–2013	1. FFC Frankfurt	6	(0)
2012–2013	1. FFC Frankfurt II	11	(0)
2013–2014	Bayern Munich	0	(0)
2014–	Bayer Leverkusen	5	(0)

International career^{‡}
2005–2006	Germany U15	8	(3)
2006–2008	Germany U17	25	(3)
2009–2010	Germany U19	20	(1)
2010	Germany U20	3	(0)
- * Club domestic league appearances and goals as of 19:22, 15 August 2013 (UTC) ‡ National team caps and goals as of 13 June 2010

Valeria Katharina Kleiner (born 27 March 1991) is a German football player who plays as defender for Bayer Leverkusen in the Women Bundesliga and for the Germany Women's National U-20.

== Career ==
=== Club career ===
Valeria Kleiner began playing football at TSV Oberreitnau in 1998. Later on she played for FC Wangen and VfB Friedrichshafen.

In 2007, she joined SC Freiburg and she made her first appearance in the match against FC Saarbrücken becoming the youngest player to play for SC Freiburg in Bundesliga.

She joined 1. FFC Frankfurt in 2010/11 and 2011/12 football season.

On 9 August 2013, she signed a contract with Bayern Munich.

=== International career ===
In October 2008, Kleiner won her first call up to the Germany Women's National Under-17. In May 2008 she began the captain of the team and Germany won the Uefa Women's Under-17 Championship in Nyon. In the same tournament she was named in the UEFA top 11 team.

In November 2008, she was part of the Germany Women's National Under-19 that reached the third place in the 2008 FIFA U-17 Women's World Cup. In 2010, after the UEFA Women's U-19 Championship, UEFA named her in the top 10 players list.

In June 2010, Kleiner was named in the Germany Women's National U-20 Team by the trainer Maren Meinert to take part in the 2010 FIFA U-20 Women's World Cup in Germany.

== Honours ==
National team

- FIFA U-20 Women's World Cup: Winner 2010
- FIFA U-17 Women's World Cup: Third Place 2008
- UEFA Women's Under-17 Championship Winner 2008
- DFB-Pokal: Winner 2011

Individual

- Bronze Fritz-Walter Medal 2008
