= Julia Debitzki =

German footballer (born 1991)

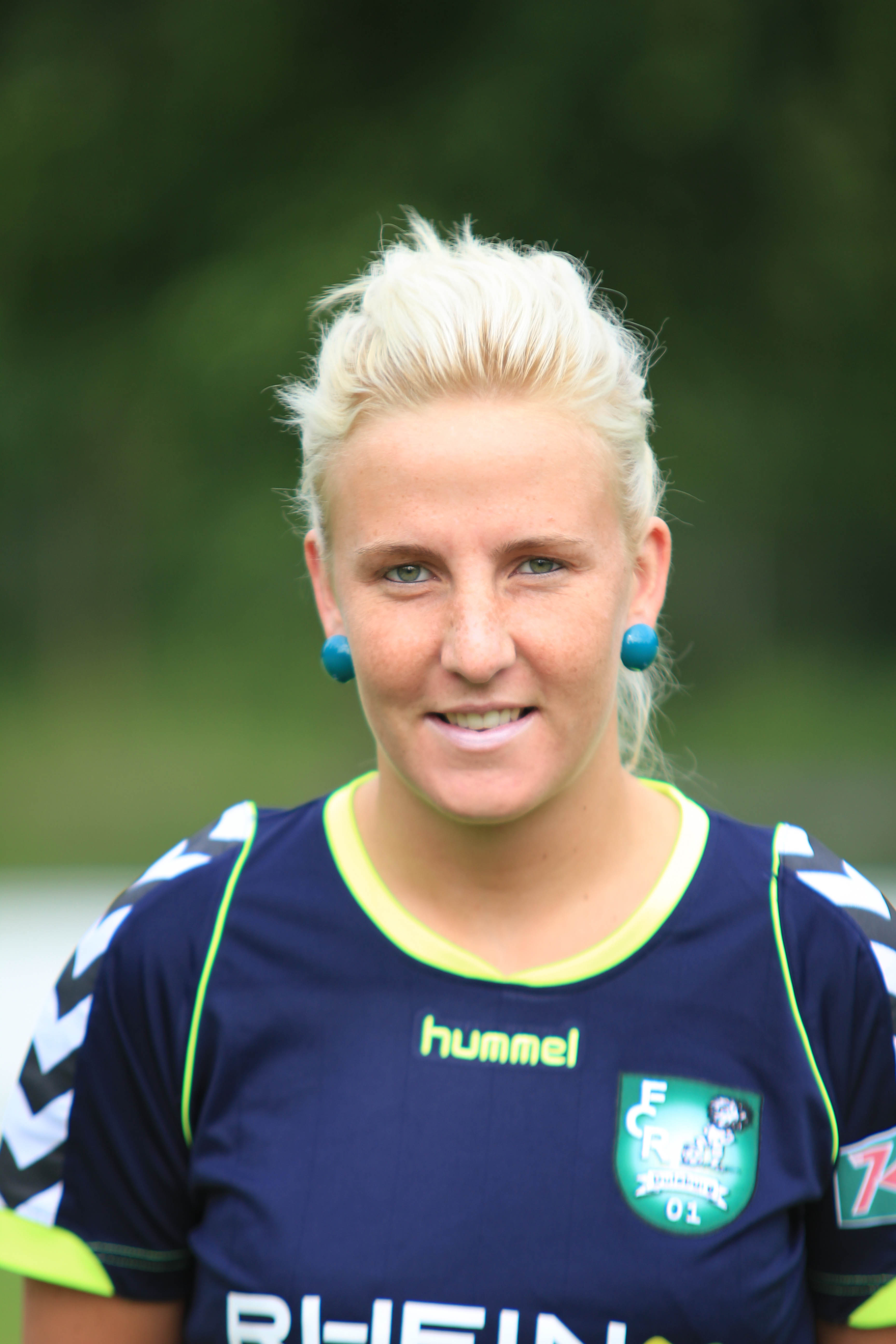

Personal information
- Full name: Julia Debitzki
- Date of birth: 25 June 1991 (age 35)
- Place of birth: Duisburg, Germany
- Height: 1.72 m (5 ft 8 in)
- Position: Midfielder

Team information
- Current team: Schalke 04
- Number: 23

Senior career*
Years	Team	Apps	(Gls)
2007–2008	MSV Duisburg II	14	(2)
2008–2009	SG Wattenscheid 09	20	(1)
2009–2011	SC 07 Bad Neuenahr	29	(0)
2011–2012	MSV Duisburg II	32	(5)
2012–2021	MSV Duisburg	86	(4)
2021–2026	SGS Essen	57	(2)
2024–2025	SGS Essen II	4	(0)
2026–	Schalke 04	3	(0)
- * Club domestic league appearances and goals as of 19 September 2026

Julia Debitzki (born 25 June 1991) is a German footballer who plays as a midfielder for Schalke 04.
