= Paola Genes =

Paraguayan footballer (born 1991)

Personal information
- Full name: Paola María Genes Garcete
- Date of birth: 14 June 1991 (age 35)
- Height: 1.72 m (5 ft 8 in)
- Position: Centre back

Team information
- Current team: Libertad/Limpeño
- Number: 15

Senior career*
Years	Team	Apps	(Gls)
- Rakiura
20??–2015	Cerro Porteño		
2016–2017	Deportivo Capiatá		
2018	Cerro Porteño		
2019–	Libertad/Limpeño		

International career^{‡}
2008	Paraguay U17	3	(1)
2010–2018	Paraguay	3	(0)
- * Club domestic league appearances and goals ‡ National team caps and goals as of 12 April 2018

Paola María Genes Garcete (born 14 June 1991) is a Paraguayan footballer who plays as a centre back for Libertad/Limpeño. She has also played for the Paraguay women's national team.

== International career ==
Genes represented Paraguay at the 2008 FIFA U-17 Women's World Cup. At senior level, she played two Copa América Femenina editions (2010 and 2018).
