= Patricia Mantey =

Ghanaian footballer

Personal information
- Date of birth: 27 September 1992 (age 34)
- Position: Goalkeeper

Senior career*
Years	Team	Apps	(Gls)
- Immigration Accra
- Rivers Angels F.C.

International career^{‡}
- Ghana
- * Club domestic league appearances and goals ‡ National team caps and goals as of 11 October 2014 (before the 2014 African Women's Championship)

Patricia Mantey (born 27 September 1992) is a Ghanaian footballer who plays as a goalkeeper for the Ghana women's national football team. She was part of the team at the 2014 African Women's Championship. On club level she played for Immigration Accra in Ghana. In 2020, she signed for NWFL Premiership side, Rivers Angels F.C.
