= Solène Barbance =

French footballer (born 1991)

Personal information
- Date of birth: 13 August 1991 (age 35)
- Place of birth: Rodez, France
- Height: 1.61 m (5 ft 3 in)
- Position: Midfielder

Team information
- Current team: Rodez
- Number: 24

Senior career*
Years	Team	Apps	(Gls)
2009–2011	Toulouse	36	(5)
2011–2012	Paris Saint-Germain	3	(0)
2012	AS Muret	3	(0)
2013–2014	ASPTT Albi	5	(1)
2014–2015	Rodez	40	(5)
2015–2017	Bordeaux	43	(2)
2017–2019	Dijon	57	(5)
2019–2022	Rodez	22	(1)

International career
- Occitania
- * Club domestic league appearances and goals as of 19:03, 12 September 2024 (UTC)

Solène Barbance (born 13 August 1991) is a French footballer who plays as a midfielder for Seconde Ligue club Rodez.

== Career ==
=== Toulouse ===
Barbance started her career with French side Toulouse.

=== Peamount United ===
In 2012, she signed for Peamount United in the Republic of Ireland, helping them win the 2013 WNL Cup.

=== Rodez ===
In 2015, she returned to French club Rodez.

== International career ==
She represented France at the 2015 Summer Universiade and at the 2015 World Military Cup, helping them win both.
