= Jung Bo-ram =

South Korean footballer

Jung Bo-ram 정보람
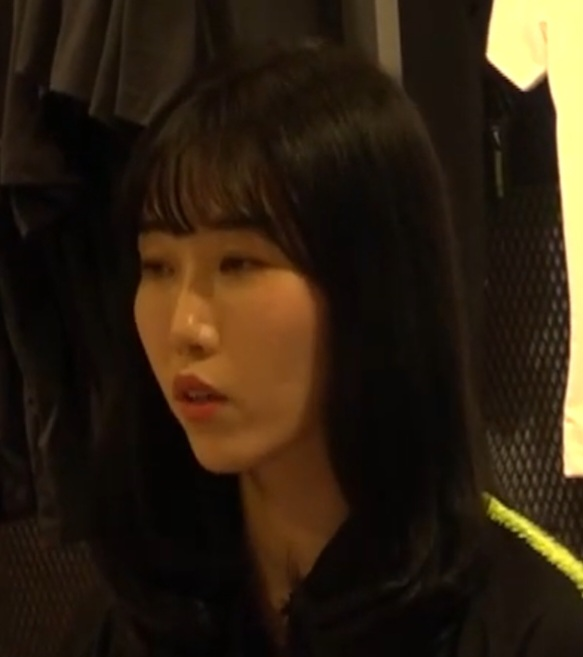

Personal information
- Date of birth: 22 July 1991 (age 35)
- Place of birth: South Korea,
- Height: 1.72 m (5 ft 7 1/2 in)
- Position: Goalkeeper

College career
Years	Team	Apps	(Gls)
- Yeoju University

Senior career*
Years	Team	Apps	(Gls)
2012-2014	Seoul WFC		
2015-2024	Hwacheon KSPO	30	(0)

International career^{‡}
2007	South Korea U17	2	(0)
2011	South Korea Universiade	5	(0)
2016–2019	South Korea	3	(0)
- * Club domestic league appearances and goals ‡ National team caps and goals as of 06:42, 16 September 2026 (UTC)

Jung Bo-ram (Korean: 정보람, born 22 July 1991) is a South Korean former footballer who played as a goalkeeper.

== Early life ==
As a child, Jung enjoyed several sports and even played competitive basketball for a year, but took up football on the suggestion of a friend of her father's, who worked in the sport.

== Club career ==
Having played for Yeoju University, Jung registered for the 2012 WK League new players' draft. She played for Seoul City for three seasons before transferring to Hwacheon KSPO in 2015. Jung retired from football at the end of the 2024 season.

== International career ==
Jung played two matches for the South Korea U17 team in 2007. She made her full international debut on 7 June 2016 in a friendly match against Myanmar. Jung was part of South Korea's squad for the 2018 Asian Games. The following year, she was included in the squad for the 2019 FIFA Women's World Cup, gaining an opportunity amid an injury crisis that saw several of South Korea's most experienced goalkeepers unavailable for the tournament.

== Honours ==
=== Hwacheon KSPO ===
- National Sports Festival champions: 2019
