= Lynn Mester =

German footballer

Personal information
- Full name: Lynn Julia Mester
- Date of birth: 27 March 1992 (age 34)
- Place of birth: Coesfeld, Germany
- Height: 1.63 m (5 ft 4 in)
- Position: Midfielder

Youth career
- –2009: Westfalia Osterwick

Senior career*
Years	Team	Apps	(Gls)
2009–2011	Bayer Leverkusen	22	(18)

International career
2007	Germany U15	5	(3)
2007–2008	Germany U16	6	(0)
2007–2009	Germany U17	25	(13)
2010–2011	Germany U19	3	(0)
- * Club domestic league appearances and goals

Lynn Julia Mester (born 27 March 1992) is a German former footballer who played as a midfielder for Bundesliga club Bayer Leverkusen.

== Club career ==
Lynn Mester joined Bayer Leverkusen for the 2009–10 season, from the youth of Westfalia Osterwick. After competing in second division 2. Bundesliga South for the initial season, the team was promoted to the Frauen-Bundesliga for the 2010–11 Bundesliga season. Although primarily played in midfield, Mester was top scorer of her team with 18 goals. The club and Mester agreed to immediate separation in January 2011.

== International career ==
Mester played a total of 39 games for the youth teams of the Germany national team. She won the European championship with the German U-17 national team in both 2008 and 2009 and finished third at the U-17 World Cup 2008 in New Zealand.

== Personal life ==
Mester is the younger sister of football player Ina Lehmann, who plays for SGS Essen. She is the cousin of Mathias Mester, a javelin and discus thrower, who is multiple world champion and competes for the athletic division of German sports club Bayer Leverkusen. She was previously in a relationship with footballer Christian Clemens from 1. FC Köln and Schalke 04.

Mester qualified as an office clerk through an apprenticeship at Bayer AG and currently works for a recruiting company.

== Honours ==
Bayer Leverkusen

- 2. Bundesliga South: 2010

Germany U17

- FIFA U-17 Women's World Cup third place: 2008
- UEFA Women's Under-17 Championship: 2008, 2009
