= Florence Dadson =

Ghanaian footballer (born 1992)

Personal information
- Full name: Florence Dadson
- Date of birth: 23 April 1992 (age 34)
- Place of birth: Cape Coast, Ghana
- Position: Striker

Team information
- Current team: RMU Eagles
- Number: 11

Youth career
- Academy of Christ the King
- 2006–2007: Ghatel Ladies Cape Coast

Senior career*
Years	Team	Apps	(Gls)
2007–2010	Ghatel Ladies Cape Coast		
2011–2013	RMU Eagles	42	(50)
2014–	Gulf Coast Texans	7	(7)

International career
	Ghana U-17	3	(2)
	Ghana U-20	3	(0)
2012–	Ghana		
- * Club domestic league appearances and goals

Florence Dadson (born 23 April 1992) is a Ghanaian female footballer, who currently plays for the Gulf Coast Texans in the United States.

== Club career ==
Dadson started her career in the Academy of Christ the King and joined Ghatel Ladies Cape Coast at age thirteen. She left her homeland, Ghana, in September 2011 after she gained admission to the Robert Morris University in Illinois to pursue her undergraduate studies in Business Administration – Majoring in Tourism Studies. She played for RMU alongside Ghanaian team members Olivia Amoako and Linda Eshun.

After graduating from Robert Morris University in the Spring of 2014, she joined to W-League club Gulf Coast Texans.

== International career ==
Dadson played as a forward and has represented her country at both U-17 and U-20 levels. Dadson played for Ghana at the 2008 FIFA U-17 Women's World Cup and 2012 FIFA U-20 Women's World Cup. She stands also in the extended squad of the Black Queens.

== Personal life ==
Dadson married Ghanaian international footballer David Accam on 3 January 2019 in Cape Coast, Ghana.

== Honours ==
Ghana

- Africa Women Cup of Nations : Third-place 2016
