= Rose Lavaud =

French Association football player (born 1992)

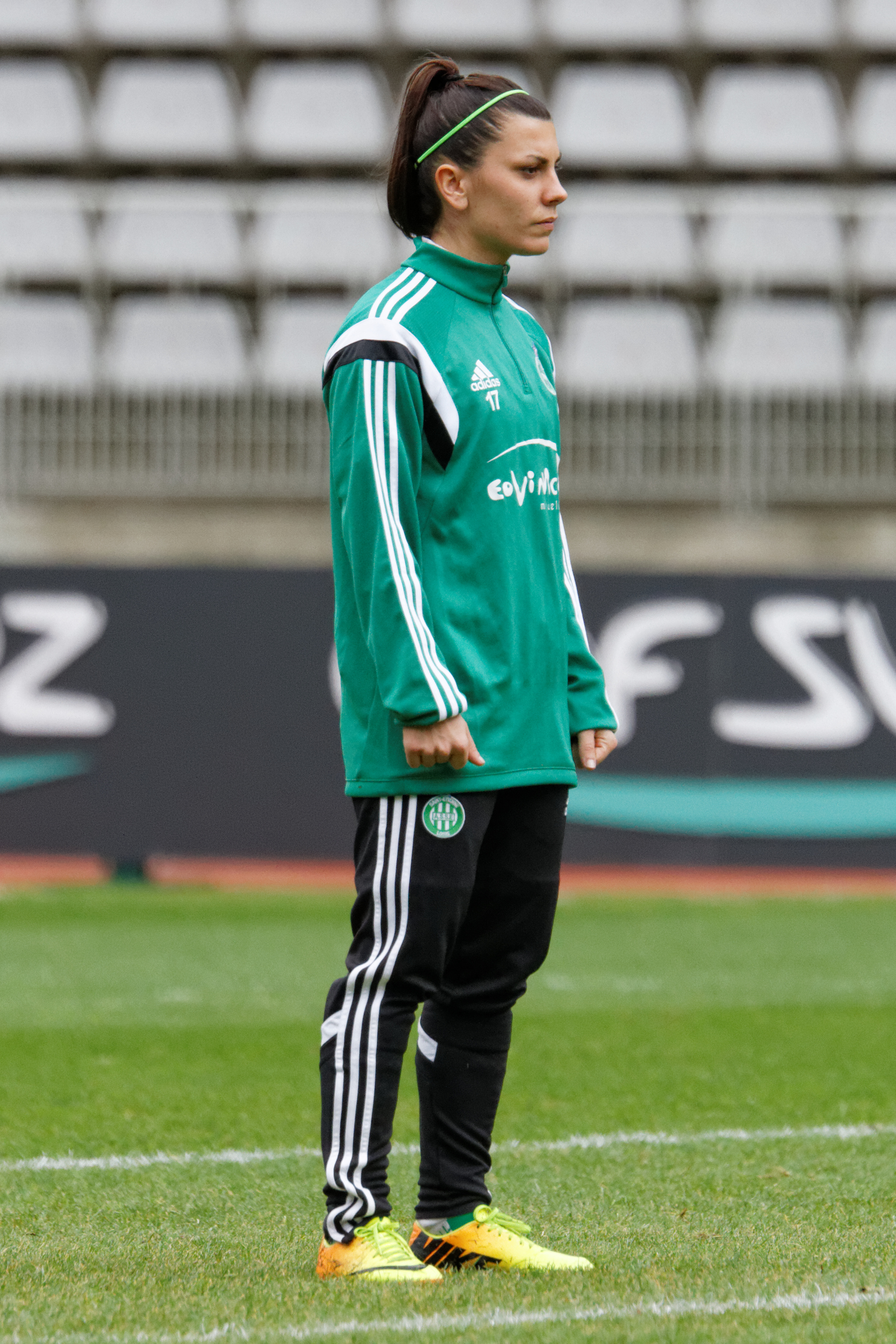

Personal information
- Date of birth: 6 April 1992 (age 34)
- Place of birth: Tulle, France
- Height: 1.58 m (5 ft 2 in)
- Position: Forward

Senior career*
Years	Team	Apps	(Gls)
2007–2009	Limoges Landouge	28	(11)
2009–2010	Flacé Mâcon	19	(6)
2010–2011	Toulouse	21	(2)
2011–2017	Saint-Étienne	107	(20)
2017–2019	Bordeaux	40	(2)
2019–2025	Dijon	99	(6)

International career
2007	France U16	2	(0)
2008–2009	France U17	10	(0)
2009–2011	France U19	17	(8)
2010	France U20	1	(0)
2014–2017	France B	13	(1)
2013	France	1	(0)
- * Club domestic league appearances and goals as of 14:57, 1 December 2024 (UTC)

Rose Lavaud is a French football player who plays as a forward.

Lavaud has played over 250 matches in the Première Ligue.

== Career ==
=== Toulouse ===
Lavaud made her league debut against Lyon on 5 September 2010. She scored her first league goal against Le Mans on 19 September 2010, scoring in the 16th minute.

=== Saint-Étienne ===
Lavaud made her league debut against Rodez on 11 September 2011. She scored her first league goal against Juvisy on 9 October 2011, scoring in the 8th minute.

=== Bordeaux ===
Lavaud made her league debut against Lille on 3 September 2017. She scored her first league goal against Fleury on 22 September 2018, scoring in the 41st minute.

=== Dijon ===
In 2019, Lavaud signed with Dijon for one season. She made her league debut on 24 August 2019 against Paris FC. Lavaud scored her first league goal against Soyaux on 18 January 2020. On 11 June 2020, she extended her contract with the club. On 16 June 2023, Lavaud extended her contract with the club until 2024.

Lavaud has played over 100 matches for Dijon.

== International career ==
Rose Lavaud represented France at the 2010 UEFA Women's Under-19 Championship.

In November 2013, Lavaud was called up to the senior France squad for the first time. She made her international debut against Bulgaria on 28 November 2013.

Lavaud has also played for the France B team and the Occitania national football team.
