= Rosemary Ampem =

Ghanaian footballer (born 1992)

Personal information
- Date of birth: 27 August 1992 (age 34)
- Position: Defender

Senior career*
Years	Team	Apps	(Gls)
- Ghana Immigration Football Club

International career^{‡}
- Ghana
- * Club domestic league appearances and goals ‡ National team caps and goals as of 11 october 2014 (before the 2014 African Women's Championship)

Rosemary Ampem (born 27 August 1992) is a Ghanaian footballer who plays as a defender for the Ghana women's national football team and the Ghana Immigration football team. She was part of the team at the 2014 African Women's Championship.

== Career ==
Ampem played for the Ghana national women's football team in the 2014 African Women's Championship.
