= Marta Mason =

Italian singer and former footballer

Personal information
- Full name: Marta Mason
- Date of birth: 10 February 1993 (age 33)
- Place of birth: Camposampiero, Italy
- Position: Striker

Senior career*
Years	Team	Apps	(Gls)
2008–2010	Venezia	31	(6)
2010–2011	Reggiana	25	(6)
2011–2012	Chiasiellis	8	(0)
2012–2013	Bardolino	23	(11)
2013–2014	AGSM Verona	23	(22)
2014–2016	Mozzanica	27	(13)
2017–2018	Valpolicella	10	(1)
2018–2019	ChievoVerona Valpo		

International career
- Italy U19
- * Club domestic league appearances and goals

Marta Mason (born 10 February 1993) is an Italian singer and former footballer who played as a striker. She was an Italy under-19 international. Following her football career, she has pursued a singing career.

== Singing career ==
In the 2016–17 season, Mason took some time away from football to appear on the television singing contest Amici di Maria De Filippi. This marked the beginning of her singing career.

== Personal life ==
As of 2022, Mason lives in Verona, and divides her time working as a massage therapist, video producer, and singer.
