= Occitania women's national football team =

Sports team of the European region of Occitania

Occitania
- Nickname: La Seleccion
- Association: Occitania Football Association
- Head coach: (France) Sylvain Blaise
- Most caps: Rose Lavaud (5)
- Top scorer: Laurie Saulnier (6); Rose Lavaud (6)
First colours	Second colours

First international
- Occitania 12–1 Lusatian Serbian (Italy; 19 June 2016)

Biggest win
- Occitania 12–1 Lusatian Serbian (Italy; 19 June 2016)

Biggest defeat
- Occitania 2–3 South Tyrol (Italy; 24 June 2016)

Europeada
- Appearances: 1 (first in 2016)
- Best result: Second place (2016)

The Occitania women's national football team (Occitan: Equipa nacionala de fotbòl feminí d'Occitània) is the football team of Occitania, which is the name given to areas of southern France, westernmost Italy and a small valley in northern Spain where the Occitan language is spoken. It is controlled by the Associacion Occitania de Fotbol.

Occitania also play in the Europeada, which is organised by the Federal Union of European Nationalities (FUEN). In the Europeada 2016 Occitania reached the final, being eliminated by eventual tournament winner South Tyrol. In the 2016 tournament and lost after extra time, finishing 2nd out of 6 teams.

== Tournament records ==
=== Europeada record ===
Year	Round	Position	GP	W	D	L	GS	GA
(Italy) Europeada 2016	Runners-up	2nd	4	3	0	1	22	–5
(Austria) Europeada 2022	Did not participate							
(Denmark) (Germany) Europeada 2024	Did not participate							
Total			4	3	0	1	22	–5

== Results and upcoming fixtures ==
Date	Venue	Opponent	Score
19 June 2016	Europeada 2016 – Italy	Lusatian Serbian	12–1 report
21 June 2016	Europeada 2016 – Italy	South Tyrol	2–1 report
23 June 2016	Europeada 2016 – Italy	Ladin	6–0 report
24 June 2016	Europeada 2016 – Italy	South Tyrol	2–3 report
6 June 2017	Friendly – France	Rodez AF (women)	3–1 report
2018	Friendly – Sweden	Sápmi (Women)	Canceled

== Personalities of the team ==
=== Current squad ===
==== Squad for the Europeada 2016 ====
Club	Name
Goalkeeper
FF Nîmes Métropole Gard	Noémie Cuberes
AS Monaco FF	Charlotte Ridoux
Defensive
Toulouse FC (women)	Morgane Ritter
US Castanet-Tolosane	Pauline Exposito
Rodez AF (women)	Manon Alard
Montpellier HSC (women)	Isabelle Dedieu
Montpellier HSC (women)	Laura Prouzet Garcia
Midfielder
Montpellier HSC (women)	Manon Bruno
Montpellier HSC (women)	Manon Agullo
Rodez AF (women)	Solène Barbance
Toulouse FC (women)	Laura Asensio
FC St Estève	Farah Lagra
Forward
AS Saint-Étienne (women)	Rose Lavaud
FF Nîmes Métropole Gard	Laurie Saulnier
FC St Estève	Sarah Dernis
Staff	Name
Head coach	Sylvain Blaise
President	Nicolas Desachy
Physical therapy	Paul Walcker
Team coach	José Olacia
Occitan commentator	Maurizio Giraudo

=== Managers ===
Manager	Period	Played	Won	Drawn	Lost	Win %
(France) Sylvain Blaise	2016	5	4	0	1	80.0
Totals		5	4	0	1	80
