= Jacqueline González =

Paraguayan footballer (born 1991)

Personal information
- Full name: Jacqueline Diana González Servín
- Date of birth: 2 October 1991 (age 35)
- Height: 1.69 m (5 ft 7 in)
- Position: Midfielder

Senior career*
Years	Team	Apps	(Gls)
- Rakiura
- Cerro Porteño

International career^{‡}
2008	Paraguay U17	2	(2)
2014	Paraguay	2	(0)
- * Club domestic league appearances and goals ‡ National team caps and goals as of 18 September 2014

Jacqueline Diana "Jacky" González Servín (born 2 October 1991) is a Paraguayan footballer who plays as a midfielder. She has been a member of the Paraguay women's national team and has also played for the national under-17 squad.

== International career ==
González represented Paraguay at the 2008 FIFA U-17 Women's World Cup. At senior level, she played the 2014 Copa América Femenina.
