= Pauline Crammer =

French football player (born 1991)

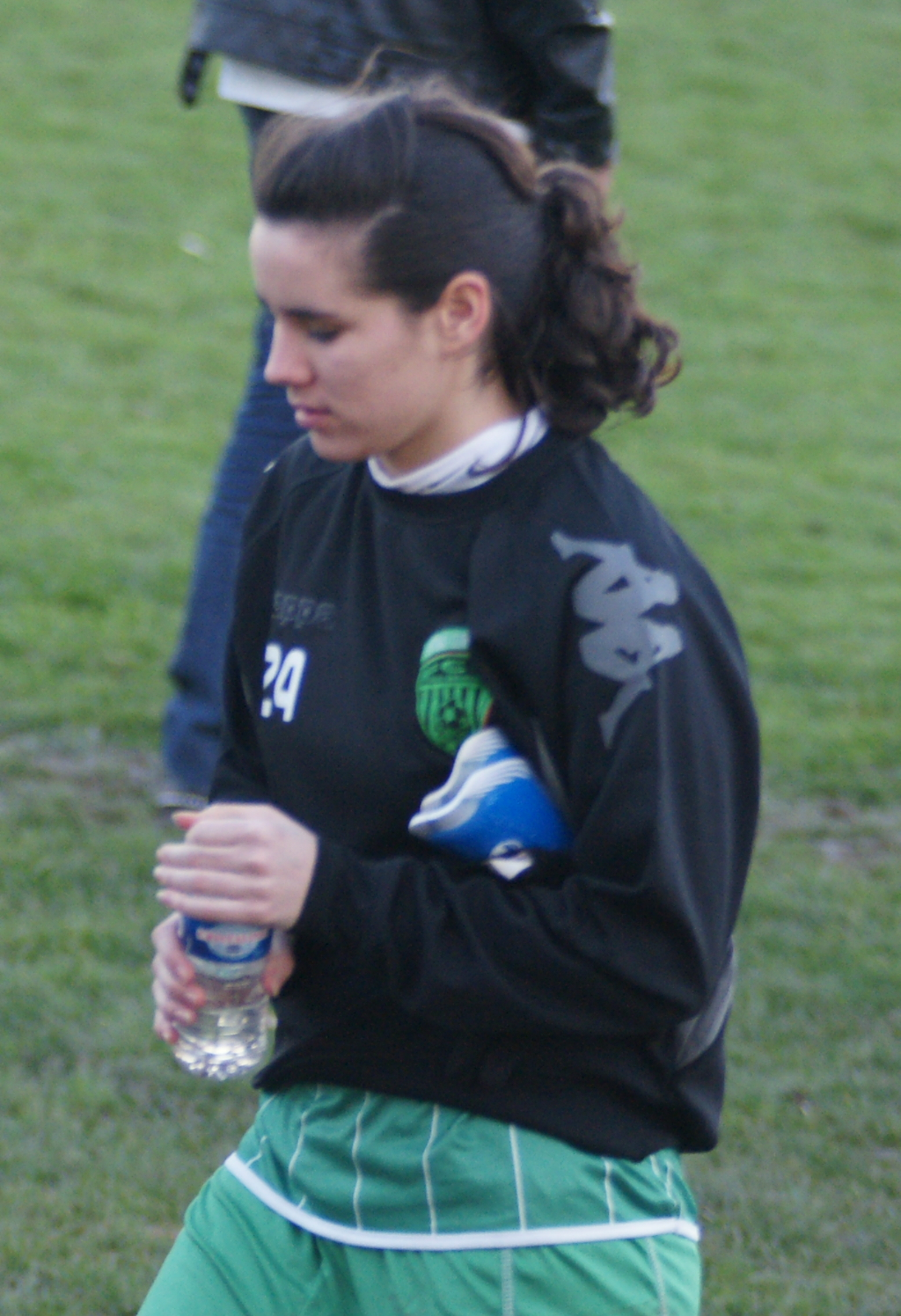

Personal information
- Full name: Pauline Crammer
- Date of birth: 14 February 1991 (age 35)
- Place of birth: Cucq, France
- Height: 1.67 m (5 ft 6 in)
- Position: Striker

Team information
- Current team: RSC Anderlecht
- Number: 9

Youth career
- 1997–1999: Verton
- 1999–2006: Le Touquet

Senior career*
Years	Team	Apps	(Gls)
2006–2012	Hénin-Beaumont	109	(50)
2012–2013	Dames SV Zulte-Waregem	24	(13)
2013–2015	RSC Anderlecht	48	(37)
2017-2020	Arras FCF	28	(15)
2020-2021	Hénin-Beaumont	1	(1)

International career^{‡}
2006–2008	France U17	26	(20)
2009–2010	France U19	20	(11)
2009–2010	France U20	3	(1)
2010	France	1	(0)
- * Club domestic league appearances and goals as of 29 September 2022 (UTC) ‡ National team caps and goals as of 16 September 2016 (UTC)

Pauline Crammer (born 14 February 1991) is a French footballer who last played as a striker for Hénin-Beaumont. Prior to that, she played for Arras FCF in the French Division 2 Féminine and RSC Anderlecht in the BeNe League.

== Career ==
Crammer was born in the commune of Cucq just off the coast of the English Channel and began her career at nearby club FCF Hénin-Beaumont. She remained in the club's youth system until the 2006–07 season, when, despite being only 15 years old, was promoted to the senior team. Despite her age, she performed well scoring 12 goals in 20 matches. The 2007–08 season saw a decrease in playing time and goals scored as Crammer only appeared in 16 matches and scored three goals. Crammer quickly returned to form the following season scoring 14 goals off of 18 appearances. Her spectacular play saw Hénin-Beaumont finish in 5th position.

Crammer got off to a fast start for the 2009–10 season scoring four goals in her first seven league matches including a brace in her club's shocking 3–1 upset of powerhouse Lyon. Her quick start placed her among the top goalscorers for the season.

== International career ==
Crammer has been active with the women's section of the national team. She has earned caps with the women's under-17, under-18, and under-19 teams. With the under-17 team, she participated in both the 2008 UEFA Women's Under-17 Championship and the inaugural 2008 FIFA U-17 Women's World Cup, where France were eliminated in the group stage. In the final group stage match against Paraguay, Crammer became the first woman to score a hat trick in the tournament's history. With the under-19s, Crammer played in the 2009 UEFA Women's Under-19 Championship where France reached the semi-finals before bowing out to Sweden in extra time.
