= Natsuki Kishikawa =

Japanese footballer (born 1991)

Personal information
- Date of birth: 26 April 1991 (age 35)
- Place of birth: Kanagawa Prefecture, Japan
- Height: 1.68 m (5 ft 6 in)
- Position: Midfielder

Team information
- Current team: Nojima Stella
- Number: 8

Senior career*
Years	Team	Apps	(Gls)
2009–2015	Urawa Reds	98	(9)
2016–2017	MyNavi Sendai	31	(0)
2018–2020	BV Cloppenburg	37	(5)
2020–2025	JEF United Chiba	25	(5)
2025–	Nojima Stella		

International career
2010	Japan U-20	3	(2)
- * Club domestic league appearances and goals

Natsuki Kishikawa (born 26 April 1991) is a Japanese professional footballer who plays as a midfielder for WE League club Nojima Stella Kanagawa Sagamihara.

== Club career ==
Kishikawa made her WE League debut on 20 September 2021.
