= Vicki DiMartino =

American former soccer player

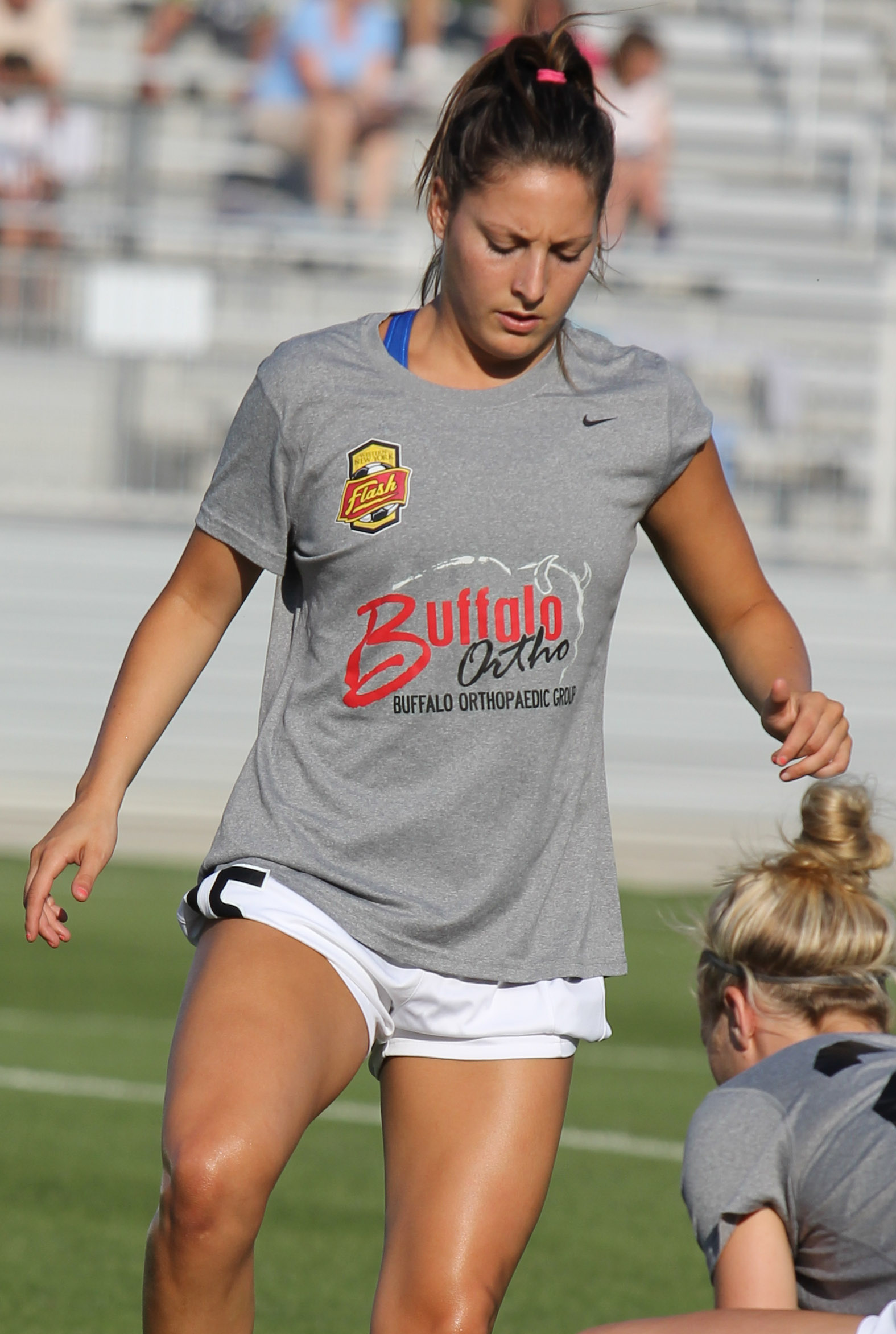

Personal information
- Full name: Victoria Teresa DiMartino
- Date of birth: September 4, 1991 (age 35)
- Place of birth: Long Island, New York, United States
- Height: 5 ft 7 in (1.70 m)
- Positions: Forward; defender

Youth career
- Albertson Fury
- 2005–2008: Massapequa High School

College career
Years	Team	Apps	(Gls)
2009–2012	Boston College Eagles		

Senior career*
Years	Team	Apps	(Gls)
2009	Long Island Fury		(14)
2013	Western New York Flash	12	(2)

International career
2008	United States U-17		
2009–2010	United States U-20	17	(1)
- * Club domestic league appearances and goals

Victoria Teresa DiMartino (born September 4, 1991) is an American former soccer player from Massapequa, New York. She was a forward for the Western New York Flash in the National Women's Soccer League, and a defender for the United States U-20 women's national soccer team.

== Early life ==
DiMartino grew up in Massapequa, New York and attended Massapequa High School where she was a 2009 Parade All-American. During her three seasons at Massapequa, she scored 52 goals and provided 27 assists. She was named All-County as a freshman, sophomore and junior. In 2007, she was named an NSCAA Youth All-American. As a junior, she earned All-Long Island and Big Apple Player of the Year honors. She played in three games as a senior due to national team commitments.

As a teenager, she played for club team, the Alberston Fury. She won the New York State Cup every year she played in the tournament.

=== Boston College ===
DiMartino attended Boston College and played for the Eagles for four years. She finished her career at Boston as the third all-time in points scored with 93 career points. She finished third on the goals scored list with 34 and fifth in assists with 25.

== Club career ==
In 2013, DiMartino was drafted to the Western New York Flash in the National Women's Soccer League. She was selected seventh in the third round during the 2013 NWSL College Draft.

== International career ==
DiMartino has represented the United States on the U-15, U-16, U-17, U-20, and U-23 national teams. A multi-dimensional player, she played as forward for the U-17 team, as outside back and outside midfield for the U.S. U-20 team and also played forward at the U-20 World Cup. She is a member of the U.S. team that won the 2010 CONACAF U-20 Women's Championships in Guatemala to earn a berth to the 2010 FIFA U-20 Women's World Cup.

DiMartino was one of the leading scorers for the U-17 team in 2008. She scored five goals in five consecutive games (the only U.S. player ever to achieve that feat in a World Cup) and won the Silver Boot as the second-leading scorer at the U-17 Women's World Cup in New Zealand. She scored twice at the CONCACAF U-17 Women's Qualifying Tournament. She finished her U-17 international career with nine goals in 14 matches.

== Personal ==
DiMartino has two older sisters who played professional soccer. Her oldest sister Christina DiMartino, a former star at UCLA, was a midfielder for the United States women's national soccer team and Philadelphia Independence. Another sister, Gina DiMartino, was a forward for the Philadelphia Independence.

== Honors ==
Western New York Flash

- NWSL Shield: 2013
