= Haruka Hamada =

Japanese footballer

Personal information
- Date of birth: 26 January 1993 (age 33)
- Place of birth: Takatsuki, Osaka, Japan
- Height: 1.73 m (5 ft 8 in)
- Position: Midfielder

Team information
- Current team: Mynavi Sendai
- Number: 10

Youth career
- 2006–2010: JFA Academy Fukushima

Senior career*
Years	Team	Apps	(Gls)
2009	Ohara Gakuen JaSRA	9	(5)
2010–2011	TEPCO Mareeze	8	(0)
2011–2013	Speranza Osaka-Takatsuki	36	(12)
2014–	Mynavi Sendai	107	(42)

International career
2010	Japan U17	4	(0)
2011	Japan U19		
2012	Japan U20	6	(0)
2021	Japan	2	(0)
- * Club domestic league appearances and goals as of 8 April 2021

Haruka Hamada (浜田 遥, Hamada Haruka; born 26 January 1993) is a Japanese footballer currently playing as a midfielder in the WE League.

== Career statistics ==
=== Club ===
Club	Season	League			National Cup		League Cup		Other		Total	
Club	Season	Division	Apps	Goals	Apps	Goals	Apps	Goals	Apps	Goals	Apps	Goals
JFA Academy Fukushima	2008	–			2 (Note: Appearances in the Empress's Cup)	0	–		0	0	2	0
JFA Academy Fukushima	2009	–			3	4	–		0	0	3	4
JFA Academy Fukushima	2010	–			1	0	–		0	0	1	0
JFA Academy Fukushima	Total		0	0	6	4	0	0	0	0	6	4
Ohara Gakuen JaSRA	2009	Nadeshiko League Div 2	9	5	0	0	–		0	0	9	5
TEPCO Mareeze	2010	Nadeshiko League	8	0	0	0	0	0	0	0	8	0
TEPCO Mareeze	2011	Nadeshiko League	0	0	0	0	0	0	0	0	0	0
TEPCO Mareeze	Total		8	0	0	0	0	0	0	0	8	0
Speranza Osaka-Takatsuki	2011	Challenge (West)	9	11	1	1	0	0	0	0	10	12
Speranza Osaka-Takatsuki	2012	Nadeshiko League	18	1	1	1	2 (Note: Appearances in the Nadeshiko League Cup)	0	0	0	21	2
Speranza Osaka-Takatsuki	2013	Nadeshiko League	9	0	2	2	4	0	0	0	15	2
Speranza Osaka-Takatsuki	Total		36	12	4	4	6	0	0	0	46	16
Mynavi Sendai	2014	Nadeshiko League	24	7	3	6	0	0	0	0	27	13
Mynavi Sendai	2015	Nadeshiko League Div 1	17	5	3	0	0	0	0	0	20	5
Mynavi Sendai	2016	Nadeshiko League Div 1	17	6	3	2	9	1	0	0	29	9
Mynavi Sendai	2017	Nadeshiko League Div 1	16	4	0	0	7	2	0	0	23	6
Mynavi Sendai	2018	Nadeshiko League Div 1	16	5	3	0	7	2	0	0	26	7
Mynavi Sendai	2019	Nadeshiko League Div 1	18	5	3	0	7	0	0	0	28	5
Mynavi Sendai	2020	Nadeshiko League Div 1	17	15	4	4	0	0	0	0	21	19
Mynavi Sendai	2021–22	WE League	0	0	0	0	0	0	0	0	0	0
Mynavi Sendai	Total		107	42	19	12	37	5	0	0	163	59
Career total			160	59	29	20	43	5	0	0	232	84

=== International ===
As of matches played 27 March 2023.

National Team	Year	Apps	Goals
Japan
Japan	2021	2	0
Total		2	0
