= Jessica Holbrook =

English footballer (born 1992)

Jess Holbrook
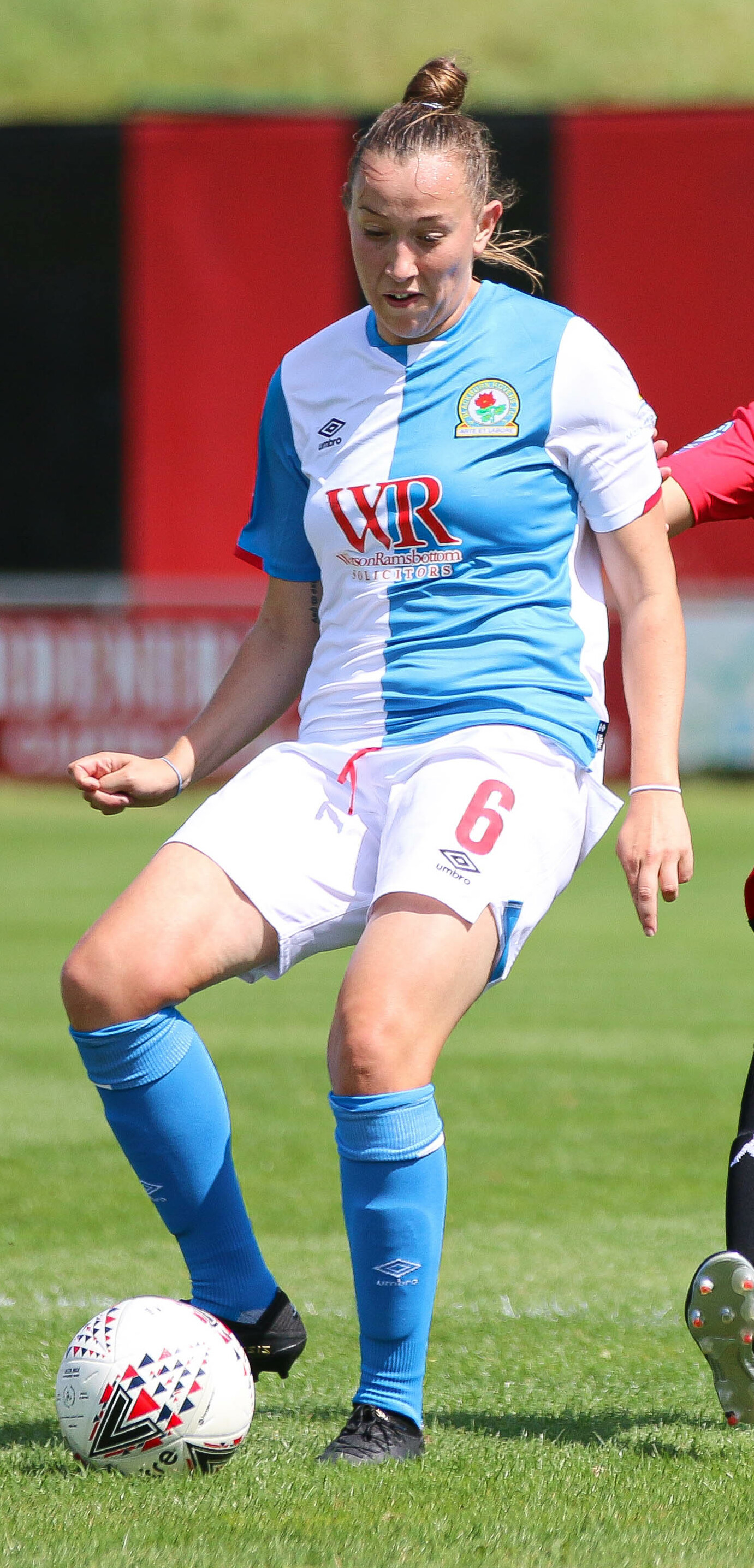
- Holbrook playing for Blackburn Rovers on 18 August 2019

Personal information
- Full name: Jessica Holbrook
- Date of birth: 1 August 1992 (age 34)
- Place of birth: Manchester, England
- Height: 1.72 m (5 ft 8 in)
- Position: Midfielder

Youth career
- Everton

Senior career*
Years	Team	Apps	(Gls)
2009–2011	Everton	6	(0)
2010	→ Leeds City Vixens (loan)	5	(1)
2011–2012	Leeds United	24	(4)
2013	Liverpool	8	(0)
2014	Manchester City	5	(0)
2014–2020	Blackburn Rovers	109	(23)
2020–	AFC Fylde	39	(8)

International career^{‡}
- England (under-17)
- * Club domestic league appearances and goals as of 08:30, 13 December 2022 (UTC) ‡ National team caps and goals as of 08:30, 13 December 2022 (UTC)

Jessica Holbrook (born 1 August 1992) is an English former footballer who played as a midfielder.

== Career ==
In 2013, Holbrook joined Liverpool from Leeds United.

On 24 January 2014, after winning the Women's Super League with Liverpool during the 2013 season, Holbrook was announced at Manchester City.

== International career ==
Holbrook represented England at the 2008 FIFA U-17 Women's World Cup.

== Honours ==
England

- UEFA Women's Under-19 Championship: 2009

Liverpool Ladies

- WSL Women's Super League : 2013
