= Amenze Aighewi =

Nigerian footballer

Personal information
- Date of birth: 21 November 1991 (age 34)
- Height: 1.70 m (5 ft 7 in)
- Position: Forward

Senior career*
Years	Team	Apps	(Gls)
?-2012	Rivers Angels		
?-2015	Edo Queens		(1)

International career^{‡}
2011	Nigeria	3	(0)
- * Club domestic league appearances and goals ‡ National team caps and goals as of before the 2011 FIFA Women's World Cup

Amenze Aighewi (born November 21, 1991) is a Nigerian footballer who played as a forward. She was part of the national team at the 2011 FIFA Women's World Cup.

== Club career ==
S Amenze he scored a late penalty goal for Edo Queens in a 2015 Nigerian Women Football League match against Rivers Angels ending their seven match unbeaten run

== International career ==
Amenze was capped at senior level for the Nigeria women's national team and participated in the 2011 FIFA Women's World Cup. She participated in the FIFA women's world cup qualifiers in 2011 group stage.

== Coaching career ==
Amenze is listed among 10 former Super Falcons players who are participating in the CAF C - License Coaching Course (for women), showing a shift from her playing career to coaching and development roles in Nigerian women's football.
