= 2010 FIFA U-20 Women's World Cup squads =

This article lists the squads for the 2010 FIFA U-20 Women's World Cup, held in Germany. Each competing federation was allowed a 21-player squad, which had to be submitted to FIFA no later than 25 June.

== Group A ==
=== Germany ===
Coach: (Germany) Maren Meinert

No.	Pos.	Player	Date of birth (age)	Caps	Club
1	GK	Almuth Schult	9 February 1991 (aged 19)	5	(Germany) Magdeburger FFC
2	MF	Stefanie Mirlach	18 April 1990 (aged 20)	9	(Germany) Bayern Munich
3	DF	Tabea Kemme	14 December 1991 (aged 18)	6	(Germany) 1. FFC Turbine Potsdam
4	DF	Marith Prießen	17 December 1990 (aged 19)	7	(Germany) Bayer Leverkusen
5	MF	Kristina Gessat	8 November 1990 (aged 19)	7	(Germany) FC Gütersloh
6	MF	Marina Hegering (c)	17 April 1990 (aged 20)	11	(Germany) FCR Duisburg
7	FW	Jessica Wich	14 July 1990 (aged 19)	7	(Germany) 1. FFC Turbine Potsdam
8	MF	Selina Wagner	6 October 1990 (aged 19)	7	(Germany) VfL Wolfsburg
9	FW	Svenja Huth	25 January 1991 (aged 19)	7	(Germany) 1. FFC Frankfurt
10	FW	Dzsenifer Marozsán	18 April 1992 (aged 18)	5	(Germany) 1. FFC Frankfurt
11	FW	Alexandra Popp	6 April 1991 (aged 19)	3	(Germany) FCR Duisburg
12	GK	Desirée Schumann	6 February 1990 (aged 20)	6	(Germany) 1. FFC Turbine Potsdam
13	MF	Sylvia Arnold	4 May 1991 (aged 19)	6	(Germany) FF USV Jena
14	DF	Inka Wesely	10 May 1991 (aged 19)	1	(Germany) 1. FFC Turbine Potsdam
15	DF	Valeria Kleiner	27 March 1991 (aged 19)	2	(Germany) 1. FFC Frankfurt
16	MF	Marie-Louise Bagehorn	7 July 1991 (aged 19)	2	(Germany) 1. FFC Turbine Potsdam
17	MF	Turid Knaak	24 January 1991 (aged 19)	2	(Germany) FCR Duisburg
18	FW	Anne Bartke	2 March 1991 (aged 19)	4	(Germany) FF USV Jena
19	MF	Kim Kulig	9 April 1990 (aged 20)	10	(Germany) Hamburger SV
20	DF	Bianca Schmidt	23 January 1990 (aged 20)	12	(Germany) 1. FFC Turbine Potsdam
21	GK	Laura Benkarth	14 October 1992 (aged 17)	0	(Germany) SC Freiburg

=== Costa Rica ===
Coach: Randall Chacón.

No.	Pos.	Player	Date of birth (age)	Caps	Club
1	GK	Priscilla Tapia	2 May 1991 (aged 19)	—	(Costa Rica) Alajuela
2	DF	María Gamboa	7 July 1993 (aged 17)	—	(Costa Rica) San Ramón
3	MF	Daniela Vega	19 February 1991 (aged 19)	—	(Costa Rica) Cartago
4	MF	Mariela Campos	4 January 1991 (aged 19)	—	(Costa Rica) Alajuela
5	MF	Gabriela Guillén	1 March 1992 (aged 18)	—	(United States) Creighton Bluejays
6	MF	Mónica Vargas	20 December 1990 (aged 19)	—	(Costa Rica) Alajuela
7	MF	Paola Alvarado	11 April 1991 (aged 19)	—	(Costa Rica) San José
8	DF	Daniela Cruz	8 March 1991 (aged 19)	—	(Costa Rica) Flores
9	FW	Carolina Venegas	28 September 1991 (aged 18)	—	(Costa Rica) Arenal Coronado
10	MF	Katherine Alvarado (captain)	11 April 1991 (aged 19)	—	(Costa Rica) San José
11	FW	Raquel Rodríguez Cedeño	28 October 1993 (aged 16)	—	(Costa Rica) San José
12	FW	Raquel Rodríguez Vásquez	3 August 1991 (aged 18)	—	(Costa Rica) Alajuela
13	GK	María Arias	4 May 1991 (aged 19)	—	(United States) Saint Louis Billikens
14	DF	Marianne Ugalde	25 March 1991 (aged 19)	—	(Costa Rica) Alajuela
15	FW	María Moreira	25 April 1993 (aged 17)	—	(Costa Rica) Alajuela
16	FW	Angélica Fallas	22 April 1993 (aged 17)	—	(Costa Rica) Alajuela
17	DF	Yoxcelín Rodríguez	15 April 1992 (aged 18)	—	(Costa Rica) San José
18	FW	Ana Aguilar	14 November 1990 (aged 19)	—	(Costa Rica) San José
19	DF	Fabiola Sánchez	9 April 1993 (aged 17)	—	(Costa Rica) Alajuela
20	DF	Hazel Quirós	7 July 1992 (aged 18)	—	(Costa Rica) Alajuela
21	GK	Jacqueline Palacios	23 July 1993 (aged 16)	—	(United States) Aliso Niguel High School

=== Colombia ===
Coach: (Colombia) Ricardo Rozo

No.	Pos.	Player	Date of birth (age)	Caps	Club
1	GK	Paula Forero	25 January 1992 (aged 18)	—	(Colombia) Liga de Fútbol de Bogotá
2	DF	Lina Taborda	2 November 1991 (aged 18)	—	(Colombia) Liga de Fútbol del Quindío
3	DF	Natalia Gaitán (c)	3 April 1991 (aged 19)	—	(Colombia) Liga de Fútbol de Bogotá
4	DF	Jackeline Fonseca	17 April 1990 (aged 20)	—	(Colombia) Liga de Fútbol de Bogotá
5	MF	Natalia Ariza	21 February 1991 (aged 19)	—	(Colombia) Liga de Fútbol de Bogotá
6	MF	Daniela Montoya	22 August 1990 (aged 19)	—	(Colombia) Liga Antioqueña de Fútbol
7	FW	Ingrid Vidal	22 April 1991 (aged 19)	—	(Colombia) Liga Vallecaucana de Fútbol
8	MF	Paola Sánchez	11 September 1991 (aged 18)	—	(Colombia) Liga de Fútbol de Bogotá
9	FW	Katerin Castro	21 November 1991 (aged 18)	—	(Colombia) Liga de Fútbol del Tolima
10	MF	Yoreli Rincón	27 July 1993 (aged 16)	—	(Colombia) Liga de Fútbol de Bogotá
11	MF	Liana Salazar	16 September 1992 (aged 17)	—	(Colombia) Liga de Fútbol de Bogotá
12	GK	Catalina Pérez	8 November 1994 (aged 15)	—	(United States) Team Boca
13	DF	Yulieht Domínguez	6 September 1993 (aged 16)	—	(Colombia) Liga de Fútbol del Tolima
14	MF	Melissa Cepeda	4 January 1993 (aged 17)	—	(Colombia) Liga Vallecaucana de Fútbol
15	MF	Tatiana Ariza	21 February 1991 (aged 19)	—	(Colombia) Liga de Fútbol de Bogotá
16	FW	Lady Andrade	10 January 1992 (aged 18)	—	(Colombia) Liga de Fútbol de Bogotá
17	MF	Carolina Arias	2 September 1990 (aged 19)	—	(Colombia) Liga Vallecaucana de Fútbol
18	MF	Ana María Montoya	24 September 1991 (aged 18)	—	(United States) Lake Oswego SC
19	MF	Vanessa Aponte	25 October 1991 (aged 18)	—	(United States) Florida Rush
20	FW	Melissa Ortiz	24 September 1990 (aged 19)	—	(United States) Lynn Fighting Knights
21	GK	Alexandra Avenado	9 May 1992 (aged 18)	—	(Colombia) Liga Antioqueña de Fútbol

=== France ===
Coach: (France) Jean-Michel Degrange

No.	Pos.	Player	Date of birth (age)	Caps	Club
1	GK	Solène Chauvet	8 October 1991 (aged 18)	—	(France) La Roche-sur-Yon
2	DF	Annaïg Butel	15 February 1992 (aged 18)	—	(France) Juvisy
3	MF	Charlotte Bilbault	5 June 1990 (aged 20)	—	(France) Nord Allier Yzeure
4	DF	Kelly Gadéa	25 March 1991 (aged 19)	—	(France) Saint-Étienne
5	DF	Adeline Rousseau	24 July 1991 (aged 18)	—	(France) La Roche-sur-Yon
6	MF	Léa Rubio	6 May 1991 (aged 19)	—	(France) Paris Saint-Germain
7	FW	Marina Makanza	1 July 1991 (aged 19)	—	(France) Saint-Étienne
8	DF	Audrey Février (c)	20 July 1990 (aged 19)	—	(France) Stade Briochin
9	FW	Pauline Crammer	14 February 1991 (aged 19)	—	(France) Hénin-Beaumont
10	FW	Solène Barbance	13 August 1991 (aged 18)	—	(France) Toulouse
11	FW	Fanny Tenret	11 March 1990 (aged 20)	—	(France) Rodez
12	DF	Caroline La Villa	12 February 1992 (aged 18)	—	(France) Montpellier
13	DF	Alexandra Plantive	12 February 1990 (aged 20)	—	(France) La Roche-sur-Yon
14	MF	Inès Jaurena	14 May 1991 (aged 19)	—	(United States) Florida State Seminoles
15	MF	Aude Moreau	5 August 1990 (aged 19)	—	(France) Montigny-le-Bretonneux
16	GK	Laëtitia Philippe	4 May 1991 (aged 19)	—	(France) Montpellier
17	FW	Rose Lavaud	6 April 1992 (aged 18)	—	(France) Flacé-Mâcon
18	DF	Marion Torrent	17 April 1992 (aged 18)	—	(France) Montpellier
19	MF	Amélie Barbetta	16 March 1991 (aged 19)	—	(France) Saint-Étienne
20	FW	Camille Catala	6 May 1991 (aged 19)	—	(France) Saint-Étienne
21	GK	Pauline Peyraud-Magnin	17 March 1992 (aged 18)	—	(France) Lyon

== Group B ==
=== Brazil ===
Coach: (Brazil) Marcos Gaspar

No.	Pos.	Player	Date of birth (age)	Caps	Club
1	GK	Aline	9 January 1992 (aged 18)	—	(Brazil) Mixto
2	DF	Leah	13 December 1990 (aged 19)	—	(United States) Texas Longhorns
3	DF	Juliana Cardozo	6 September 1991 (aged 18)	—	(Brazil) Botucatu
4	DF	Estergiane (c)	9 July 1990 (aged 20)	—	(Brazil) CBF
5	MF	Bruna	7 July 1992 (aged 18)	—	(Brazil) Atlético Mineiro
6	MF	Rafaelle	18 June 1991 (aged 19)	—	(Brazil) São Francisco do Conde
7	FW	Ketlen	7 January 1992 (aged 18)	—	(Brazil) Santos
8	MF	Camila	24 July 1991 (aged 18)	—	(Brazil) Caxias
9	FW	Débora Oliviera	20 October 1991 (aged 18)	—	(Brazil) Portuguesa de Desportos
10	MF	Alanna	10 March 1990 (aged 20)	—	(Brazil) Ferroviária
11	FW	Andressa Alves	10 November 1992 (aged 17)	—	(Brazil) Juventus
12	GK	Monique	5 March 1992 (aged 18)	—	(Brazil) CBF
13	DF	Marina	24 April 1991 (aged 19)	—	(Brazil) Marília
14	MF	Lara	23 March 1990 (aged 20)	—	(Brazil) Kindermann
15	MF	Aline Carmago	14 May 1990 (aged 20)	—	(Brazil) Botucatu
16	DF	Thaynara	2 March 1991 (aged 19)	—	(Brazil) Vassouras
17	FW	Rafaela	31 January 1991 (aged 19)	—	(Brazil) Ferroviária
18	MF	Edna	31 May 1992 (aged 18)	—	(Brazil) Juventus
19	DF	Poliana	6 February 1991 (aged 19)	—	(Brazil) São José
20	DF	Ludmila	9 December 1990 (aged 19)	—	(Brazil) CBF
21	FW	Ana Patrícia	14 June 1991 (aged 19)	—	(Brazil) Pelotas

=== North Korea ===
Coach: (North Korea) Kwang Sok Choe

No.	Pos.	Player	Date of birth (age)	Caps	Club
1	GK	Hong Myong-hui	4 September 1991 (aged 18)	—	(North Korea) 25 April
2	DF	Hyon Un-hui	22 November 1991 (aged 18)	—	(North Korea) 25 April
3	DF	Jo Myong-hui	6 July 1991 (aged 19)	—	(North Korea) 25 April
4	DF	Yun Song-mi	28 January 1992 (aged 18)	—	(North Korea) Pyongyang City
5	DF	Won Un-ha	6 November 1990 (aged 20)	—	Unattached
6	MF	Ryo Song-mi	13 March 1990 (aged 20)	—	Unattached
7	MF	Choe Un-ju	23 January 1991 (aged 19)	—	(North Korea) Pyongyang City
8	MF	Kim Un-hyang	26 August 1993 (aged 16)	—	(North Korea) 25 April
9	FW	Cha Ok	21 October 1992 (aged 17)	—	(North Korea) Amrokgang
10	FW	Choe Mi-gyong	17 January 1991 (aged 19)	—	Unattached
11	MF	Kim Myong-gum	11 April 1990 (aged 20)	—	Unattached
12	FW	Kim Un-ju	9 April 1993 (aged 17)	—	(North Korea) 25 April
13	MF	Kim Chung-sim (c)	27 November 1990 (aged 19)	—	Unattached
14	FW	Yun Hyon-hi	9 September 1992 (aged 17)	—	(North Korea) Chobyong
15	FW	Ho Un-byol	19 January 1992 (aged 18)	—	(North Korea) 25 April
16	MF	Kang Un-gyong	5 February 1991 (aged 19)	—	(North Korea) Pyongyang City
17	FW	Jon Myong-hwa	9 August 1993 (aged 16)	—	(North Korea) 25 April
18	GK	Thak Un-mi	12 August 1991 (aged 18)	—	(North Korea) Rimyongsu
19	DF	Jon Hong-yon	11 June 1992 (aged 18)	—	(North Korea) 25 April
20	DF	Sin Sol-ryon	29 September 1990 (aged 19)	—	(North Korea) Amrokgang
21	GK	Ri Jin-sim	25 May 1991 (aged 19)	—	(North Korea) Wolmido

=== Sweden ===
Coach: (Sweden) Calle Barrling

No.	Pos.	Player	Date of birth (age)	Caps	Club
1	GK	Susanne Nilsson	30 December 1991 (aged 18)	—	(Sweden) Kopparbergs/Göteborg FC
2	DF	Catrine Johansson	18 December 1991 (aged 18)	—	(Sweden) Kopparbergs/Göteborg FC
3	DF	Jessica Samuelsson	30 January 1992 (aged 18)	—	(Sweden) Linköpings
4	DF	Emma Kullberg	25 September 1991 (aged 18)	—	(Sweden) Umeå
5	DF	Elin Borg	27 February 1990 (aged 20)	—	(Sweden) Stattena
6	DF	Mia Carlsson	12 March 1990 (aged 20)	—	(Sweden) Kristianstads
7	MF	Emilia Appelqvist (c)	11 February 1990 (aged 20)	—	(Sweden) AIK
8	MF	Josefine Alfsson	20 August 1991 (aged 18)	—	(Sweden) Malmö
9	FW	Sofia Jakobsson	23 April 1990 (aged 20)	—	(Sweden) Umeå
10	MF	Tilda Heimersson	22 December 1991 (aged 18)	—	(Sweden) Linköpings
11	FW	Olivia Schough	11 March 1991 (aged 19)	—	(Sweden) Kopparbergs/Göteborg FC
12	GK	Hilda Carlén	13 August 1991 (aged 18)	—	(Sweden) Malmö
13	DF	Amanda Ilestedt	17 January 1993 (aged 17)	—	(Sweden) Malmö
14	MF	Sarah Storck	22 September 1990 (aged 19)	—	(Sweden) Malmö
15	MF	Antonia Göransson	16 September 1990 (aged 19)	—	(Sweden) Kristianstads
16	FW	Kristin Karlsson	31 March 1991 (aged 19)	—	(Sweden) Jitex
17	FW	Jennifer Egelryd	25 July 1990 (aged 19)	—	(Sweden) Tyresö
18	FW	Amanda Wegerman	21 September 1991 (aged 18)	—	(Sweden) Vasteras
19	DF	Emelie Lövgren	3 July 1990 (aged 20)	—	(Sweden) Sunnanå
20	MF	Tempest Norlin	28 July 1991 (aged 18)	—	(Sweden) Hammarby
21	GK	Malin Reuterwall	12 October 1990 (aged 19)	—	(Sweden) Vasteras

=== New Zealand ===
Coach: (New Zealand) Tony Readings

No.	Pos.	Player	Date of birth (age)	Caps	Club
1	GK	Victoria Esson	6 March 1991 (aged 19)	—	(New Zealand) Fencibles United
2	DF	Elizabeth Milne	11 December 1990 (aged 19)	—	(New Zealand) Glenfield Rovers
3	DF	Anna Green (c)	20 August 1990 (aged 19)	—	(New Zealand) Three Kings United
4	DF	Chelsey Wood	23 June 1990 (aged 20)	—	(New Zealand) Three Kings United
5	DF	Briony Fisher	22 August 1991 (aged 19)	—	(New Zealand) Three Kings United
6	DF	Bridgette Armstrong	9 November 1992 (aged 17)	—	(New Zealand) Glenfield Rovers
7	FW	Hannah Wilkinson	28 May 1992 (aged 18)	—	(New Zealand) Glenfield Rovers
8	MF	Betsy Hassett	4 August 1990 (aged 19)	—	(United States) California Golden Bears
9	DF	Hannah Wall	3 May 1991 (aged 19)	—	(New Zealand) Three Kings United
10	MF	Annalie Longo	1 July 1991 (aged 19)	—	(New Zealand) Three Kings United
11	FW	Rosie White	6 June 1993 (aged 17)	—	(New Zealand) Three Kings United
12	MF	Claudia Crasborn	17 July 1991 (aged 18)	—	(New Zealand) Three Kings United
13	MF	Nadia Pearl	20 October 1992 (aged 17)	—	(New Zealand) Three Kings United
14	FW	Renee Leota	16 May 1990 (aged 20)	—	(New Zealand) Waterside Karori
15	MF	Emily Cooper	2 March 1992 (aged 18)	—	(New Zealand) Lynn-Avon United
16	GK	Julia Lynds	28 March 1990 (aged 20)	—	Unattached
17	MF	Sarah McLaughlin	3 June 1991 (aged 19)	—	(New Zealand) Claudelands Rovers
18	MF	Lauren Mathis	30 May 1991 (aged 19)	—	(New Zealand) Glenfield Rovers
19	FW	Terri-Amber Carlson	26 April 1990 (aged 20)	—	(New Zealand) Waterside Karori
20	GK	Erin Nayler	17 April 1992 (aged 18)	—	(New Zealand) Eastern Suburbs
21	DF	Lisa Kemp	12 January 1990 (aged 20)	—	(New Zealand) Eastern Suburbs

== Group C ==
=== England ===
Coach: (England) Mo Marley

No.	Pos.	Player	Date of birth (age)	Caps	Club
1	GK	Rebecca Spencer	2 February 1991 (aged 19)	—	(England) Arsenal
2	DF	Chelsea Weston	27 January 1990 (aged 20)	—	(England) Doncaster Rovers
3	DF	Gilly Flaherty	24 August 1991 (aged 18)	—	(England) Arsenal
4	FW	Jade Moore	22 October 1990 (aged 19)	—	(England) Leeds United
5	DF	Gemma Bonner	13 July 1991 (aged 19)	—	(England) Leeds United
6	DF	Kerys Harrop (c)	3 December 1990 (aged 19)	—	(England) Birmingham City
7	MF	Jessica Holbrook	1 August 1992 (aged 17)	—	(England) Everton
8	MF	Jordan Nobbs	8 December 1992 (aged 17)	—	(England) Sunderland
9	FW	Toni Duggan	25 July 1991 (aged 18)	—	(England) Everton
10	MF	Michelle Hinnigan	12 June 1990 (aged 20)	—	(England) Everton
11	FW	Demi Stokes	12 December 1991 (aged 18)	—	(England) Sunderland
12	DF	Lyndsey Cunningham	30 August 1991 (aged 18)	—	(England) Nottingham Forest
13	GK	Lauren Davey	1 June 1991 (aged 19)	—	(England) Watford
14	MF	Abbie Prosser	4 September 1991 (aged 18)	—	(England) Arsenal
15	DF	Lucy Bronze	28 October 1991 (aged 18)	—	(England) Sunderland
16	DF	Shelby Hills	17 April 1991 (aged 19)	—	(England) Chelsea
17	MF	Izzy Christiansen	20 September 1991 (aged 18)	—	(England) Birmingham City
18	FW	Becky Jane	31 March 1992 (aged 18)	—	(England) Chelsea
19	FW	Danielle Carter	18 May 1993 (aged 17)	—	(England) Arsenal
20	FW	Lucy Staniforth	2 October 1992 (aged 17)	—	(England) Sunderland
21	GK	Ashley Baker	15 March 1990 (aged 20)	—	(United States) Georgia Bulldogs

=== Nigeria ===
Coach: (Nigeria) Ndem Egan

No.	Pos.	Player	Date of birth (age)	Caps	Club
1	GK	Alaba Jonathan	1 June 1992 (aged 18)	—	(Nigeria) Pelican Stars
2	DF	Blessing Edoho	5 September 1992 (aged 17)	—	(Nigeria) Rivers Angels
3	DF	Gloria Ofoegbu	5 January 1992 (aged 18)	—	(Nigeria) Rivers Angels
4	MF	Martina Ohadugha	5 May 1991 (aged 19)	—	(Nigeria) Rivers Angels
5	MF	Cecilia Nku	26 October 1992 (aged 18)	—	(Nigeria) Bayelsa Queens
6	DF	Esther Michael	16 November 1992 (aged 17)	—	(Nigeria) Sunshine Queens
7	FW	Esther Sunday	13 March 1992 (aged 18)	—	(Nigeria) Sunshine Queens
8	FW	Ebere Orji	23 December 1992 (aged 17)	—	(Nigeria) Rivers Angels
9	FW	Desire Oparanozie	17 December 1993 (aged 16)	—	(Nigeria) Delta Queens
10	MF	Rebecca Kalu	12 June 1990 (aged 20)	—	(Nigeria) Delta Queens
11	MF	Glory Iroka	1 March 1990 (aged 20)	—	(Nigeria) Rivers Angels
12	GK	Rabi Ihiabe	30 December 1992 (aged 17)	—	(Nigeria) Bayelsa Queens
13	FW	Ngozi Ebere	5 August 1991 (aged 18)	—	(Nigeria) Rivers Angels
14	FW	Soo Adekwagh	15 July 1992 (aged 17)	—	(Nigeria) Bayelsa Queens
15	DF	Joy Jegede (c)	16 December 1991 (aged 18)	—	(Nigeria) Delta Queens
16	FW	Amarachi Okoronkwo	12 December 1992 (aged 17)	—	(Nigeria) Nasarawa Amazons
17	DF	Helen Ukaonu	17 May 1991 (aged 19)	—	(Nigeria) Delta Queens
18	FW	Charity Adule	7 November 1993 (aged 16)	—	(Nigeria) Pelican Stars
19	FW	Uchechi Sunday	9 September 1994 (aged 15)	—	(Nigeria) Rivers Angels
20	DF	Osinachi Ohale	21 December 1991 (aged 18)	—	(Nigeria) Delta Queens
21	GK	Marbel Egwuenu	15 December 1991 (aged 18)	—	(Nigeria) Delta Queens

=== Mexico ===
Coach: (Mexico) Roberto Medina

No.	Pos.	Player	Date of birth (age)	Caps	Club
1	GK	Cecilia Santiago	19 October 1994 (aged 15)	—	(Mexico) Santos Laguna
2	DF	Bianca Sierra	25 June 1992 (aged 18)	—	(United States) Mustang Spirit
3	DF	Alina Garciamendez	16 April 1991 (aged 19)	—	(United States) Stanford Cardinal
4	DF	Marylin Díaz	18 November 1991 (aged 18)	—	(Mexico) Andrea's Soccer
5	DF	Valeria Miranda	18 August 1992 (aged 18)	—	(Mexico) Pumas UNAM
6	DF	Kenti Robles	15 February 1991 (aged 19)	—	(Spain) Espanyol
7	MF	Nayeli Rangel (c)	28 February 1992 (aged 18)	—	(Mexico) Monterrey Royal Eagles
8	MF	Mirelle Arciniega	13 August 1992 (aged 17)	—	(Mexico) Puebla FC
9	FW	Stephany Mayor	23 September 1991 (aged 18)	—	(Mexico) UDLA Puebla
10	FW	Charlyn Corral	11 September 1991 (aged 18)	—	(Mexico) ITESM Monterrey
11	FW	Renae Cuéllar	24 June 1990 (aged 20)	—	(United States) Arizona Wildcats
12	GK	Brissa Rangel	24 June 1990 (aged 20)	—	(Mexico) Pumas UNAM
13	DF	Olivia Jiménez	26 February 1992 (aged 18)	—	(United States) Arizona Rush
14	DF	Mónica Alvarado	11 January 1991 (aged 19)	—	(United States) Mississippi State Bulldogs
15	MF	Angélica Figueroa	14 May 1990 (aged 20)	—	(United States) Pacific Tigers
16	MF	Ashley Kotero	23 November 1992 (aged 17)	—	(United States) West Coast FC
17	MF	Natalia Gómez Junco	9 October 1992 (aged 17)	—	(Mexico) ITESM Monterrey
18	DF	Natalie García	30 January 1990 (aged 20)	—	(United States) San Diego Toreros
19	MF	Ana Cruz	4 March 1990 (aged 20)	—	(United States) Chemeketa Community College
20	GK	Diana Sánchez	5 May 1990 (aged 20)	—	(Mexico) Chivas
21	MF	Mar Rodríguez	17 September 1991 (aged 18)	—	(United States) UC Irvine Anteaters

=== Japan ===
Coach: (Japan) Norio Sasaki

No.	Pos.	Player	Date of birth (age)	Caps	Club
1	GK	Erina Yamane	20 October 1990 (aged 19)	—	(Japan) Tepco Mareeze
2	DF	Yuko Takeyama	30 September 1991 (aged 18)	—	(Japan) Urawa Red Diamonds
3	DF	Misaki Kobayashi	21 August 1990 (aged 19)	—	(Japan) NTV Beleza
4	DF	Natsuki Kishikawa	26 April 1991 (aged 19)	—	(Japan) Urawa Red Diamonds
5	DF	Saki Kumagai (c)	17 October 1990 (aged 20)	—	(Japan) Urawa Red Diamonds
6	DF	Yuria Obara	4 September 1990 (aged 19)	—	(Japan) Albirex Niigata
7	MF	Nozomi Fujita	21 February 1992 (aged 18)	—	(Japan) Urawa Red Diamonds
8	MF	Yuika Sugasawa	5 October 1990 (aged 19)	—	(Japan) Albirex Niigata
9	FW	Megumi Takase	10 November 1990 (aged 19)	—	(Japan) INAC Kobe
10	FW	Mana Iwabuchi	18 March 1993 (aged 17)	—	(Japan) NTV Beleza
11	MF	Michi Goto	27 July 1990 (aged 19)	—	(Japan) Urawa Red Diamonds
12	GK	Mayu Funada	9 November 1990 (aged 19)	—	(Japan) JEF United Chiba
13	FW	Sawako Yasumoto	6 July 1990 (aged 20)	—	(Japan) Tepco Mareeze
14	MF	Emi Nakajima	27 September 1990 (aged 19)	—	(Japan) INAC Kobe
15	MF	Yuka Kado	19 June 1990 (aged 20)	—	(Japan) Yunogo Belle
16	DF	Ayano Dozono	27 March 1990 (aged 20)	—	(Japan) Urawa Red Diamonds
17	MF	Shoko Yamada	23 July 1990 (aged 19)	—	(Japan) JEF United Chiba
18	MF	Akane Saito	12 January 1993 (aged 17)	—	(Japan) Tokiwagi Gakuen
19	MF	Shiori Kinoshita	17 August 1992 (aged 17)	—	(Japan) NTV Menina
20	FW	Nanami Seguchi	17 October 1992 (aged 17)	—	(Japan) Hinomoto Gakuen
21	GK	Ayaka Saito	26 August 1991 (aged 18)	—	(Japan) Tepco Mareeze

== Group D ==
=== United States ===
Coach: (United States) Jill Ellis

No.	Pos.	Player	Date of birth (age)	Caps	Club
1	GK	Bianca Henninger	22 October 1990 (aged 19)	—	(United States) Santa Clara Broncos
2	DF	Toni Pressley	19 February 1990 (aged 20)	—	(United States) Florida State Seminoles
3	DF	Rachel Quon	21 May 1991 (aged 19)	—	(United States) Stanford Cardinal
4	DF	Crystal Dunn	3 July 1992 (aged 18)	—	(United States) North Carolina Tar Heels
5	DF	Kendall Johnson	24 April 1991 (aged 19)	—	(United States) Portland Pilots
6	FW	Vicki DiMartino	4 September 1991 (aged 18)	—	(United States) Boston College Eagles
7	FW	Courtney Verloo	9 May 1991 (aged 19)	—	(United States) Stanford Cardinal
8	MF	Samantha Mewis	9 October 1992 (aged 17)	—	(United States) Scorpions SC
9	MF	Kristie Mewis	25 February 1991 (aged 19)	—	(United States) Boston College Eagles
10	MF	Teresa Noyola	15 April 1990 (aged 20)	—	(United States) Stanford Cardinal
11	MF	Christine Nairn	25 September 1990 (aged 19)	—	(United States) Penn State Nittany Lions
12	MF	Zakiya Bywaters	24 July 1991 (aged 18)	—	(United States) UCLA Bruins
13	DF	Mollie Pathman	1 July 1992 (aged 18)	—	(United States) Duke Blue Devils
14	DF	Meg Morris	11 May 1992 (aged 18)	—	(United States) North Carolina Tar Heels
15	MF	Jenna Richmond	18 December 1991 (aged 18)	—	(United States) UCLA Bruins
16	FW	Maya Hayes	26 March 1992 (aged 18)	—	(United States) Penn State Nittany Lions
17	MF	Casey Short	23 August 1990 (aged 19)	—	(United States) Florida State Seminoles
18	GK	Adrianna Franch	12 November 1990 (aged 19)	—	(United States) Oklahoma State Cowgirls
19	FW	Sydney Leroux (c)	7 May 1990 (aged 20)	—	(United States) UCLA Bruins
20	MF	Amber Brooks	23 January 1991 (aged 19)	—	(United States) North Carolina Tar Heels
21	GK	Bryane Heaberlin	2 November 1993 (aged 16)	—	(United States) Clearwater Chargers

=== Ghana ===
Coach: (Ghana) James Dadzie

No.	Pos.	Player	Date of birth (age)	Caps	Club
1	GK	Fafali Dumehasi	25 December 1993 (aged 16)		(Ghana) Vodafon Ladies
2	DF	Felicia Dapaah	30 October 1994 (aged 15)		(Ghana) Ash Town
3	MF	Henrietta Annie	1 August 1991 (aged 18)		(Ghana) Post Ladies
4	DF	Janet Egyir	7 May 1992 (aged 18)		(Ghana) Hasaacas Ladies
5	DF	Rosemary Ampem	27 August 1992 (aged 17)		(Ghana) Ash Town
6	MF	Elizabeth Cudjoe	17 October 1992 (aged 17)		(Ghana) Hasaacas Ladies
7	FW	Samira Suleman	16 August 1991 (aged 18)		(Ghana) Hasaacas Ladies
8	MF	Elizabeth Addo	1 September 1993 (aged 16)		(Ghana) Athleta Ladies
9	FW	Florence Dadson	23 April 1992 (aged 18)		(Ghana) Ghatel Ladies
10	MF	Priscilla Saahene	24 July 1992 (aged 17)		(Ghana) Ash Town
11	MF	Deborah Afriyie	3 January 1992 (aged 18)		(Ghana) Oforikrom Ladies
12	DF	Mantenn Kobblah	7 July 1991 (aged 19)		(Ghana) Faith Ladies
13	MF	Mercy Myles (c)	2 May 1992 (aged 18)		(Ghana) Nungua Ladies
14	DF	Fauzia Mustapha	16 June 1993 (aged 17)		(Ghana) Faith Ladies
15	MF	Juliet Acheampong	11 July 1991 (aged 19)		(Ghana) Ash Town
16	GK	Nana Asantewaa	28 December 1993 (aged 16)		(Ghana) Faith Ladies
17	FW	Faiza Ibrahim	22 March 1990 (aged 20)		(Ghana) Vodafon Ladies
18	DF	Edem Atovor	10 April 1994 (aged 16)		(Ghana) Ghatel Ladies
19	FW	Janet Owusu	23 April 1991 (aged 19)		(Ghana) La Ladies
20	DF	Cynthia Adobea	1 August 1990 (aged 19)		(Ghana) Reformers Ladies
21	GK	Patricia Mantey	27 September 1992 (aged 17)		(Ghana) Mawuena Ladies

=== Switzerland ===
Coach: (Switzerland) Yannick Schwery

No.	Pos.	Player	Date of birth (age)	Caps	Club
1	GK	Nathalie Schwery	27 July 1991 (aged 18)	1	(Switzerland) Thun
2	MF	Carolyn Mallaun	30 March 1992 (aged 18)	1	(Switzerland) Yverdon
3	DF	Sarah Steinmann	11 April 1991 (aged 19)	1	(Switzerland) Grasshopper
4	DF	Muriel Bouakaz	3 March 1991 (aged 19)	1	(France) Saint-Étienne
5	DF	Danique Stein (c)	16 July 1990 (aged 19)	1	(Germany) SC 07 Bad Neuenahr
6	MF	Selina Kuster	8 August 1991 (aged 18)	1	(Switzerland) Grasshopper
7	MF	Lara Keller	13 April 1991 (aged 19)	1	(Switzerland) Kriens
8	MF	Chantal Fimian	20 July 1990 (aged 19)	1	(Switzerland) Grasshopper
9	FW	Ana-Maria Crnogorčević	3 October 1990 (aged 19)	1	(Germany) Hamburger SV
10	FW	Ramona Bachmann	25 December 1990 (aged 19)	1	(United States) Atlanta Beat
11	MF	Samira Susuri	11 October 1991 (aged 18)	1	(Switzerland) Naters
12	GK	Pascale Küffer	13 November 1992 (aged 17)	1	(Switzerland) Schlieren
13	DF	Michelle Probst	31 October 1992 (aged 17)	1	(Switzerland) Zuchwil
14	MF	Cinzia Jörg	23 May 1992 (aged 18)	1	(Switzerland) St. Gallen
15	MF	Lia Wälti	19 April 1993 (aged 17)	1	(Switzerland) Young Boys
16	FW	Cora Canetta	6 January 1992 (aged 18)	1	(Switzerland) Zürich
17	MF	Jehona Mehmeti	25 September 1990 (aged 19)	1	(Switzerland) Young Boys
18	MF	Vanessa Pittet	6 August 1990 (aged 19)	1	(Switzerland) Grasshopper
19	DF	Rahel Kiwic	5 January 1991 (aged 19)	1	(Switzerland) Zürich
20	FW	Nadine Baker	8 May 1992 (aged 18)	1	(Switzerland) Zürich
21	GK	Stephanie Kaderli	20 October 1990 (aged 19)	0	(Switzerland) Thun

=== South Korea ===
Coach: (South Korea) Choi In-cheul

No.	Pos.	Player	Date of birth (age)	Caps	Club
1	GK	Moon So-ri	12 August 1990 (aged 19)		(South Korea) Ulsan College
2	DF	Seo Hyun-sook	6 January 1992 (aged 18)		(South Korea) Hanyang Women's College
3	DF	Koh Kyung-yeon	10 April 1991 (aged 19)		(South Korea) Uiduk University
4	DF	Song Ari	13 August 1991 (aged 19)		(South Korea) Hanyang Women's College
5	DF	Lim Seon-joo	27 November 1990 (aged 19)		(South Korea) Hanyang Women's College
6	DF	Jeong Yeong-a	9 December 1990 (aged 19)		(South Korea) Ulsan College
7	FW	Kwon Eun-som	13 November 1990 (aged 19)		(South Korea) Ulsan College
8	MF	Kim Na-rae	1 June 1990 (aged 20)		(South Korea) Yeojoo Institute of Technology
9	FW	Jung Hae-in	6 January 1992 (aged 18)		(South Korea) Incheon Hyundai Steel
10	FW	Ji So-yun	21 February 1991 (aged 19)		(South Korea) Hanyang Women's College
11	MF	Lee Hyun-young	16 February 1991 (aged 19)		(South Korea) Yeojoo Institute of Technology
12	GK	Jung Ji-soo	6 April 1990 (aged 20)		(South Korea) Uiduk University
13	MF	Lee Min-a	8 November 1991 (aged 18)		(South Korea) Yeungjin College
14	MF	Kim Jin-young	30 May 1990 (aged 20)		(South Korea) Yeojoo Institute of Technology
15	MF	Lee Young-ju	24 April 1992 (aged 18)		(South Korea) Dongsan Information Industry
16	DF	Lee Eun-kyung	18 March 1991 (aged 19)		(South Korea) Hanyang Women's College
17	FW	Kang Yu-mi	5 October 1991 (aged 18)		(South Korea) Hanyang Women's College
18	GK	Kang Ga-ae	12 October 1990 (aged 19)		(South Korea) Yeojoo Institute of Technology
19	MF	Jeoun Eun-ha	28 January 1993 (aged 17)		(South Korea) Pohang Girls' Electronic
20	DF	Kim Hye-ri (c)	25 June 1990 (aged 19)		(South Korea) Yeojoo Institute of Technology
21	MF	Park Hee-young	21 March 1991 (aged 19)		(South Korea) Gangwon Provincial College
