= Kang Ga-ae =

South Korean footballer

Kang Ga-ae 강가애
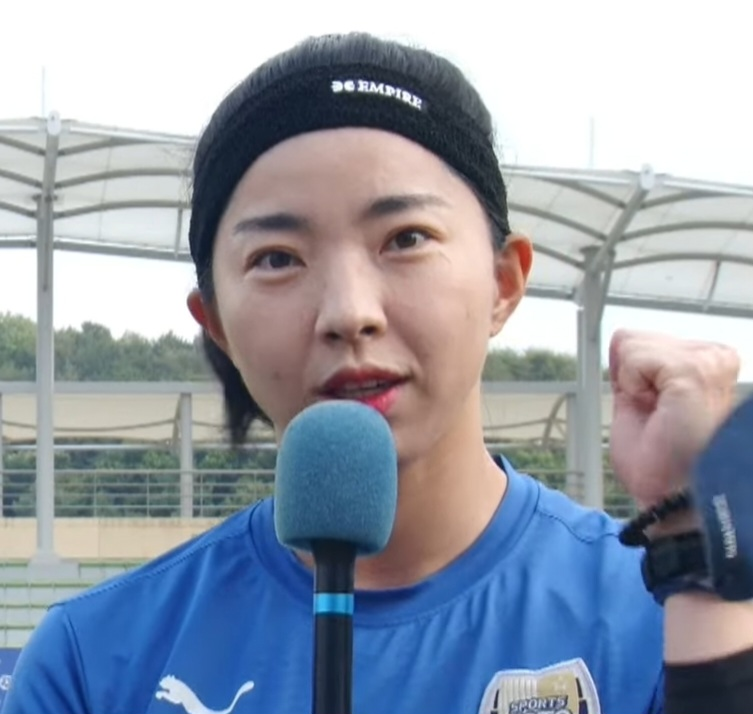

Personal information
- Date of birth: 10 December 1990 (age 35)
- Place of birth: Dangjin, South Korea
- Height: 1.72 m (5 ft 7 1/2 in)
- Position: Goalkeeper

College career
| Years | Team | Apps | (Gls) |
| 2009-2010 | Yeoju Institute of Technology | | |

Senior career*
| Years | Team | Apps | (Gls) |
| 2011–2012 | Chungnam Ilhwa Chunma | 19 | (0) |
| 2013-2024 | Sejong Sportstoto | | |
| 2013 | →Goyang Daekyo (loan) | | |

International career^{‡}
| 2010 | South Korea U20 | 1 | (0) |
| 2016–2022 | South Korea | 14 | (0) |
- * Club domestic league appearances and goals ‡ National team caps and goals as of 14:51, 21-11-2025 (UTC)

Kang Ga-ae (born 10 December 1990) is a South Korean former footballer who played as a goalkeeper.

== Early life ==
Kang became interested in football after the 2002 FIFA World Cup and got the opportunity to play thanks to the football academy at her younger brother's elementary school. Kang and her twin sister Kang Na-ru both took up football and were scouted for their talent, transferring to Deokcheon Elementary School in Anyang, where they trained in the girls' football academy. Kang progressed through the football academies at Anyang Buheung Middle School and Osan I.C.T. High School, going on to become the first choice goalkeeper of the women's football team at Yeoju Institute of Technology.

== Club career ==
Kang was selected by Chungnam Ilhwa in the third round of the 2011 WK League new players' draft. When the club was dissolved at the end of 2012, Kang signed with Chungbuk Sportstoto, but was immediately loaned to Goyang Daekyo due to their goalkeeper sustaining an injury. After four months in Goyang, she returned to Sportstoto's squad.

As Kang settled into her new club, she was gradually given more match minutes, eventually becoming Sportstoto's first choice goalkeeper in 2015. The following year, having relocated from Daejeon to Gumi, the club progressed to the WK League playoff for the first time. Kang became a core member of the Sportstoto squad, playing an important role in winning the club's first trophy at the 2017 National Women's Football Championship, a feat they repeated in 2018. She also received the best goalkeeper award at the tournament.

Kang remained a central figure at Sportstoto as the club again moved its home base in 2019, this time from Gumi to Sejong, and underwent a generational shift as several veteran players moved on and were replaced by less experienced youngsters. She played a key role in Sportstoto's 2023 National Sports Festival win, with the final against 10-time WK League champions Incheon Hyundai Steel Red Angels being decided by a penalty shootout.

Kang retired from football at the end of the 2024 season. A retirement ceremony was held for her and long-time teammate Hwang Bo-ram at Sejong Civic Stadium following Sportstoto's final WK League fixture. She was named in the 2024 WK League Best XI at the Korea Pro Footballers Association (KPFA) WK League awards. The KPFA also held a retirement ceremony for Kang at the annual KPFA Charity Match in December 2024.

== International career ==
Kang played a single match for the South Korea U20 team in 2010, a 6–2 win over Hesse in Germany. She was part the South Korean squad that came in third at the 2010 FIFA U-20 Women's World Cup, although she didn't play at the tournament as Moon So-ri was the first choice goalkeeper.

She made her full international debut on 4 June 2016 in a friendly against Myanmar, keeping a clean sheet in a 5–0 win. She did not concede a goal until her seventh cap, a 1–0 defeat to Switzerland in the 2017 Cyprus Cup. Kang was tipped to be Korea's "next generation" first choice goalkeeper as Kim Jung-mi reached the end of her international career, but she missed out on the 2018 Asian Games squad due to a torn ligament, which caused her to miss several weeks of training.

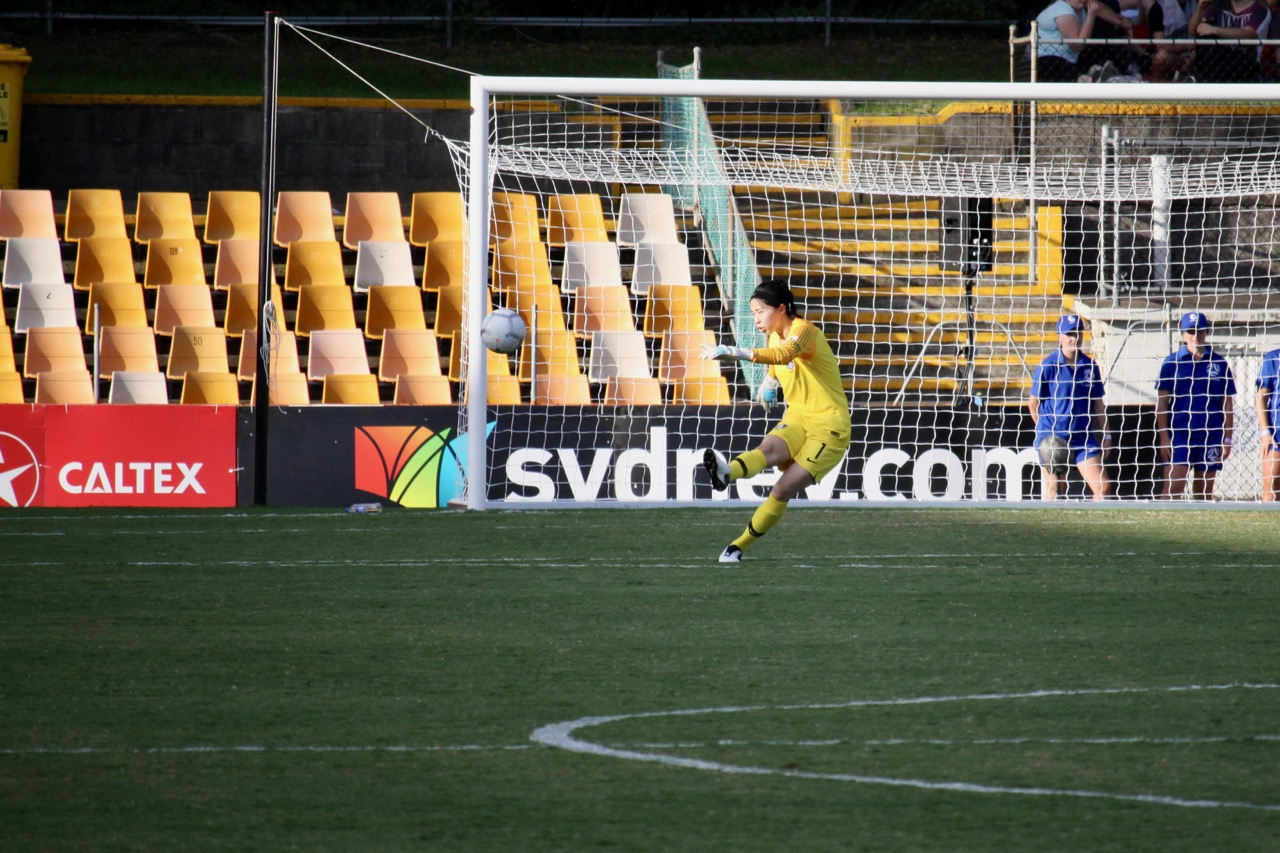
Kang playing for South Korea in 2019

Kang was part of South Korea's squad for the 2019 FIFA Women's World Cup despite sustaining tearing a muscle in her thigh shortly before the squad was announced. With experienced goalkeepers Kim Jung-mi and Yoon Young-geul also unavailable for selection due to more serious injuries, it was deemed that Kang would be able to recover in time for the tournament. However ultimately Kang did not play at the World Cup, with up-and-coming keeper Kim Min-jeong being named in the starting line-up for all three of Korea's matches.

Kang was part of South Korea's squad during qualification for the 2022 AFC Women's Asian Cup. She subsequently travelled to the tournament in India but did not play any minutes during the competition, which saw South Korea finish as runners-up and earn automatic qualification for the 2026 edition of the tournament. Following the end of the Asian Cup, Kang announced her retirement from international football.

== Personal life ==
=== Family and local community ===
When Kang's twin sister Kang Na-ru signed a contract with the newly established Jeonbuk KSPO in 2011, the pair became the first twins to play in the Korean women's top division. Kang Na-ru was forced to retire early due to a knee injury, after which Kang Ga-ae always chose shirt number 19, the same number her sister wore prior to her career being cut short, in honour of the pair's shared footballing journey.

Throughout her career Kang has maintained strong links with her native Dangjin, funding scholarships and donating supplies for aspiring footballers and golfers at local schools and supporting local football teams. In 2020 she became an ambassador for Dangjin's police force, participating in campaigns to raise awareness of domestic and sexual violence, road traffic safety and voice phishing scams.

After her retirement from football, Kang returned to Dangjin. She is the goalkeeping coach at Dangchan FC, a local women's football club established by her mother and sister.

=== Advocacy work ===
Kang was first appointed as a member of the board of directors of the Korea Pro Footballers Association in 2021. She later became the KPFA's vice-chair and regularly uses her position to call for the development of women's football in Korea, in particular the professionalisation of the WK League, the abolition of the league's salary cap, and a better youth development system. In 2024, she won the FIFPro Player Voice Award in recognition of her efforts to improve conditions for female footballers in South Korea. She was instrumental in the 2025 launch of Team KPFA, an initiative that aims to promote women's football and support the sustainable development of girls' football.

== Career statistics ==
=== International ===
As of match played 6 October 2019

Appearances and goals by national team and year
| National team | Year | Apps | Goals |
|---|---|---|---|
| South Korea | 2016 | 4 | 0 |
| South Korea | 2017 | 5 | 0 |
| South Korea | 2018 | 0 | 0 |
| South Korea | 2019 | 4 | 0 |
| Total | | 14 | 0 |

== Honours ==
=== Sejong Sportstoto ===
- National Women's Football Championship: 2017, 2018
- National Sports Festival champions: 2023

=== Individual ===
- National Women's Football Championship best goalkeeper: 2018
- FIFPro Player Voice Award: 2024
- KPFA WK League Awards Best XI: 2024
