= Shaghayegh =

Shaghayegh means corn poppy (a red flower) in Persian.

Notable people with the name include:

- Shaghayegh Cyrous (born 1987), Iranian-American artist
- Shaghayegh Dehghan (born 1979), Persian actress and writer
- Shaghayegh Farahani (born 1972), Persian actress
- Shaghayegh Rouzbahan (born 1994), Iranian footballer
