= 2018 AFC Women's Asian Cup qualification =

Tournament details
- Host countries: Tajikistan (Group A); North Korea (Group B); Palestine (Group C); Vietnam (Group D)
- Dates: 3–12 April 2017
- Teams: 21 (from 1 confederation)
- Venue(s): 4 (in 4 host cities)

Tournament statistics
- Matches played: 38
- Goals scored: 206 (5.42 per match)
- Attendance: 138,337 (3,640 per match)
- Top scorer(s): (Jordan) Maysa Jbarah (13 goals)

The 2018 AFC Women's Asian Cup qualification was the qualification tournament for the 2018 AFC Women's Asian Cup.

A total of 21 teams entered the qualification tournament, which decided four of the eight participating teams in the final tournament held in Jordan. This tournament also served as the first stage of Asian qualification for the 2019 FIFA Women's World Cup, with the top five teams of the final tournament qualifying for the World Cup.

== Draw ==
Of the 47 AFC member associations, a total of 24 teams entered the competition, with Japan, Australia, and China PR automatically qualified for the final tournament by their position as the top three teams of the 2014 AFC Women's Asian Cup and thus did not participate in the qualifying competition. Jordan also automatically qualified for the final tournament as hosts, but decided to also participate in the qualifying competition.

The draw was held on 21 January 2017, 15:00 AST (UTC+2), at the Grand Hyatt in Amman, Jordan. The 21 teams were drawn into one group of six teams and three groups of five teams.

The teams were seeded according to their performance in the 2014 AFC Women's Asian Cup final tournament and qualification. The following restrictions were also applied:

- The four teams which indicated their intention to serve as qualification group hosts prior to the draw were drawn into separate groups.
- As Iran and Syria had indicated they would not travel to Palestine, they would not be drawn into the group hosted by Palestine.

Automatically qualified for final tournament and not participating in qualification
1. **Japan**; 2. **Australia**; 3. **China**
Participating in qualification
Pot 1	Pot 2	Pot 3	Pot 4	Pot 5 (unranked)
4. **South Korea**; 5. **Thailand**; 6. **Vietnam** **(H)**; 7. **Jordan** **(Q)**	8. Myanmar; 9. Chinese Taipei; 10. Uzbekistan; 11. **Philippines**	12. Hong Kong; 13. Bahrain; 14. Lebanon **(W)**; 15. Iran	16. India; 17. Palestine **(H)**	Guam **(W)**; Iraq; North Korea **(H)**; Singapore; Syria; Tajikistan **(H)**; United Arab Emirates

Notes

- Teams in **bold** qualified for the final tournament.
- (H): Qualification group hosts
- (Q): Automatically qualified for final tournament regardless of qualification results
- (W): Withdrew after draw

Did not enter

- Afghanistan
- Bangladesh
- Bhutan
- Brunei
- Cambodia
- Indonesia
- Kuwait (suspended)
- Kyrgyzstan
- Laos
- Macau
- Malaysia
- Maldives
- Mongolia
- Nepal
- Oman
- Pakistan
- Qatar
- Saudi Arabia
- Sri Lanka
- Timor-Leste
- Turkmenistan
- Yemen

== Format ==
In each group, teams played each other once at a centralised venue. The four group winners qualified for the final tournament. If Jordan won their group, the runner-up of their group also qualified for the final tournament.

=== Tiebreakers ===
Teams were ranked according to points (3 points for a win, 1 point for a draw, 0 points for a loss), and if tied on points, the following tiebreaking criteria were applied, in the order given, to determine the rankings (Regulations Article 11.5):

1. Points in head-to-head matches among tied teams;
2. Goal difference in head-to-head matches among tied teams;
3. Goals scored in head-to-head matches among tied teams;
4. If more than two teams are tied, and after applying all head-to-head criteria above, a subset of teams are still tied, all head-to-head criteria above are reapplied exclusively to this subset of teams;
5. Goal difference in all group matches;
6. Goals scored in all group matches;
7. Penalty shoot-out if only two teams are tied and they met in the last round of the group;
8. Disciplinary points (yellow card = 1 point, red card as a result of two yellow cards = 3 points, direct red card = 3 points, yellow card followed by direct red card = 4 points);
9. Drawing of lots.

== Groups ==
The matches were played between 3–12 April 2017.

Schedule
Matchday	Group A		Groups B & D		Group C	
Matchday	Dates	Matches	Dates	Matches	Dates	Matches
Matchday 1	3 April 2017	3 v 1, 4 v 6, 2 v 5	3 April 2017	3 v 2, 5 v 4	3 April 2017	3 v 1
Matchday 2	5 April 2017	1 v 5, 2 v 4, 3 v 6	5 April 2017	4 v 1, 5 v 3	5 April 2017	2 v 3
Matchday 3	7 April 2017	5 v 3, 6 v 2, 1 v 4	7 April 2017	1 v 5, 2 v 4	7 April 2017	1 v 2
Matchday 4	10 April 2017	4 v 5, 6 v 1, 2 v 3	9 April 2017	2 v 5, 3 v 1	—	
Matchday 5	12 April 2017	5 v 6, 3 v 4, 1 v 2	11 April 2017	4 v 3, 1 v 2	—	

=== Group A ===
- All matches were held in Tajikistan.
- Times listed were UTC+5.

Pos	Team	Pld	W	D	L	GF	GA	GD	Pts	Qualification
1	Jordan (Note: Jordan, as final tournament hosts, automatically qualified regardless of qualification results.)	5	5	0	0	37	3	+34	15	Final tournament
2	Philippines	5	3	1	1	18	6	+12	10	Final tournament
3	Bahrain	5	2	2	1	10	8	+2	8	
4	United Arab Emirates	5	2	1	2	5	11	−6	7	
5	Tajikistan (H)	5	1	0	4	3	23	−20	3	
6	Iraq	5	0	0	5	0	22	−22	0	

Source: AFC
Rules for classification: Qualification tiebreakers
(H) Hosts
Notes:
3 April 2017
13:00

Bahrain	0–6	Jordan
	Report	Jebreen 9'; Jbarah 22', 30', 43'; Al-Naber 86'; Al-Masri 90'

Pamir Stadium, Dushanbe
Attendance: 40
Referee: Rebecca Durcau (Australia)
3 April 2017
16:00

Iraq	0–1	Tajikistan
	Report	Halimova 87'

Pamir Stadium, Dushanbe
Attendance: 110
Referee: Pansa Chaisanit (Thailand)
3 April 2017
19:00

Philippines	4–0	United Arab Emirates
Madarang 14', 45+1'; Navaja 49'; S. Castañeda 54'	Report

Pamir Stadium, Dushanbe
Attendance: 40
Referee: Mahsa Ghorbani (Iran)

5 April 2017
13:00

Philippines	4–0	Iraq
Madarang 21'; Long 44'; S. Castañeda 45+1'; Dolino 45+3'	Report

Pamir Stadium, Dushanbe
Attendance: 50
Referee: Anna Sidorova (Uzbekistan)
5 April 2017
16:00

Bahrain	4–0	Tajikistan
Al-Hashmi 17', 20', 78'; Al-Dossary 46'	Report

Pamir Stadium, Dushanbe
Attendance: 60
Referee: Oh Hyeon-jeong (South Korea)
5 April 2017
19:00

Jordan	6–0	United Arab Emirates
Jbarah 3', 40', 77', 81'; Al-Naber 44', 80'	Report

Pamir Stadium, Dushanbe
Attendance: 40
Referee: Yoshimi Yamashita (Japan)

7 April 2017
13:00

United Arab Emirates	1–1	Bahrain
Budebs 50'	Report	Abdulrahman 84'

Pamir Stadium, Dushanbe
Attendance: 30
Referee: Pansa Chaisanit (Thailand)
7 April 2017
16:00

Tajikistan	0–8	Philippines
	Report	Madarang 17'; A. Castañeda 34', 85'; Long 38', 59', 84'; S. Castañeda 48'; Duran 90'

Pamir Stadium, Dushanbe
Attendance: 120
Referee: Yoshimi Yamashita (Japan)
7 April 2017
19:00

Jordan	10–0	Iraq
Jebreen 1'; Al-Masri 20'; Al-Naber 27' (pen.), 61' (pen.), 81'; Jbarah 45+5', 65', 79', 84'; Breesam 77' (o.g.)	Report

Pamir Stadium, Dushanbe
Attendance: 80
Referee: Mahsa Ghorbani (Iran)

10 April 2017
13:00

Iraq	0–3	United Arab Emirates
	Report	Taheri 17'; Faleh 78'; Rashid 87'

Pamir Stadium, Dushanbe
Attendance: 30
Referee: Oh Hyeon-jeong (South Korea)
10 April 2017
16:00

Tajikistan	2–10	Jordan
Iskandari 21'; Sotnikova 76'	Report	Al-Naber 4' (pen.), 63'; Jebreen 8', 15', 23', 45+3'; Sweilem 34', 45+2'; Al-Kousheh 69'; Al-Nahar 81'

Pamir Stadium, Dushanbe
Attendance: 120
Referee: Anna Sidorova (Uzbekistan)
10 April 2017
19:00

Philippines	1–1	Bahrain
S. Castañeda 82'	Report	Al-Dossary 55'

Pamir Stadium, Dushanbe
Attendance: 50
Referee: Rebecca Durcau (Australia)

12 April 2017
13:00

Jordan	5–1	Philippines
Al-Masri 15', 48'; Jbarah 29', 37'; Al-Naber 67'	Report	Del Campo 90+1'

Pamir Stadium, Dushanbe
Attendance: 110
Referee: Yoshimi Yamashita (Japan)
12 April 2017
16:00

United Arab Emirates	1–0	Tajikistan
Rashid 90+3'	Report

Pamir Stadium, Dushanbe
Attendance: 200
Referee: Rebecca Durcau (Australia)
12 April 2017
19:00

Bahrain	4–0	Iraq
Al-Hashmi 31'; Abdulrahman 41', 71'; Tobellah 80' (pen.)	Report

Pamir Stadium, Dushanbe
Attendance: 30
Referee: Anna Sidorova (Uzbekistan)

=== Group B ===
- All matches were held in North Korea.
- Times listed were UTC+8:30.

Pos	Team	Pld	W	D	L	GF	GA	GD	Pts	Qualification
1	South Korea	4	3	1	0	21	1	+20	10	Final tournament
2	North Korea (H)	4	3	1	0	18	1	+17	10	
3	Uzbekistan	4	2	0	2	9	10	−1	6	
4	India	4	1	0	3	3	25	−22	3	
5	Hong Kong	4	0	0	4	1	15	−14	0	

Source: AFC
Rules for classification: Qualification tiebreakers
(H) Hosts
3 April 2017
15:00

North Korea	8–0	India
Ri Un-yong 7'; Ri Kyong-hyang 13'; Ri Hyang-sim 21'; Kim Phyong-hwa 45+1', 78'; Wi Jong-sim 48', 64' (pen.); Sung Hyang-sim 80'	Report

Kim Il-sung Stadium, Pyongyang
Attendance: 15,000
Referee: Bui Thi Thu Trang (Vietnam)
3 April 2017
18:00

Hong Kong	1–2	Uzbekistan
Cheung Wai Ki 80'	Report	Karachik 16'; Nozimova 90+4'

Kim Il-sung Stadium, Pyongyang
Attendance: 2,500
Referee: Casey Reibelt (Australia)

5 April 2017
15:00

North Korea	5–0	Hong Kong
Ri Un-yong 12'; Kim Yun-mi 28', 39'; Ho Wan Tung 45+1' (o.g.); Choe Un-ju 77'	Report

Kim Il-sung Stadium, Pyongyang
Attendance: 13,500
Referee: Aye Thein (Myanmar)
5 April 2017
18:00

India	0–10	South Korea
	Report	Kang Yu-mi 12'; Lee Min-a 19'; Lee Geum-min 29', 36', 67'; Lee Eun-mi 45+1'; Yoo Young-a 65'; Ji So-yun 68', 90+1'; Lee So-dam 69'

Kim Il-sung Stadium, Pyongyang
Attendance: 2,500
Referee: Lee Yi-chi (Chinese Taipei)

7 April 2017
15:00

South Korea	1–1	North Korea
Jang Sel-gi 76'	Report	Sung Hyang-sim 45+3'

Kim Il-sung Stadium, Pyongyang
Attendance: 42,500
Referee: Casey Reibelt (Australia)
7 April 2017
18:00

Uzbekistan	7–1	India
Karachik 3', 6'; Sarikova 11', 44'; Zoirova 19'; Narbekova 63'; Turdiboeva 90+2' (pen.)	Report	Bala Devi 22'

Kim Il-sung Stadium, Pyongyang
Attendance: 600
Referee: Yu Hong (China)

9 April 2017
16:00

Uzbekistan	0–4	North Korea
	Report	Kim Yun-mi 28', 90+2'; Sung Hyang-sim 54', 65'

Kim Il-sung Stadium, Pyongyang
Attendance: 40,400
Referee: Bui Thi Thu Trang (Vietnam)
9 April 2017
19:00

Hong Kong	0–6	South Korea
	Report	Cho So-hyun 44' (pen.), 71' (pen.); Yoo Young-a 63'; Kwon Eun-som 74'; Lee Geum-min 83'; Jang Sel-gi 88'

Kim Il-sung Stadium, Pyongyang
Attendance: 17,000
Referee: Lee Yi-chi (Chinese Taipei)

11 April 2017
15:00

India	2–0	Hong Kong
Malik 68' (pen.); Ratanbala Devi 70'	Report

Kim Il-sung Stadium, Pyongyang
Attendance: 50
Referee: Yu Hong (China)
11 April 2017
18:00

South Korea	4–0	Uzbekistan
Yoo Young-a 21'; Ji So-yun 23', 53'; Cho So-hyun 42'	Report

Kim Il-sung Stadium, Pyongyang
Attendance: 80
Referee: Aye Thein (Myanmar)

=== Group C ===
- All matches were held in Palestine.
- Times listed were UTC+3.

Pos	Team	Pld	W	D	L	GF	GA	GD	Pts	Qualification
1	Thailand	2	2	0	0	7	0	+7	6	Final tournament
2	Chinese Taipei	2	1	0	1	5	1	+4	3	
3	Palestine (H)	2	0	0	2	0	11	−11	0	
4	Lebanon	0	0	0	0	0	0	0	0	Withdrew
5	Guam	0	0	0	0	0	0	0	0	Withdrew

Source: AFC
Rules for classification: Qualification tiebreakers
(H) Hosts
3 April 2017
16:00

Palestine	0–6	Thailand
	Report	Kanjana 7'; Al-Sarras 19' (o.g.); Taneekarn 26'; Suchawadee 64'; Orathai 73'; Rattikan 76'

Faisal Al-Husseini International Stadium, Al-Ram
Attendance: 500
Referee: Kate Jacewicz (Australia)

5 April 2017
16:00

Chinese Taipei	5–0	Palestine
Pao 2', 15'; Yu Hsiu-chin 6', 66', 70' (pen.)	Report

Faisal Al-Husseini International Stadium, Al-Ram
Attendance: 350
Referee: Cong Thi Dung (Vietnam)

7 April 2017
16:00

Thailand	1–0	Chinese Taipei
Suchawadee 3'	Report

Faisal Al-Husseini International Stadium, Al-Ram
Attendance: 120
Referee: Kate Jacewicz (Australia)

=== Group D ===
- All matches were held in Vietnam.
- Times listed were UTC+7.

Pos	Team	Pld	W	D	L	GF	GA	GD	Pts	Qualification
1	Vietnam (H)	4	4	0	0	27	1	+26	12	Final tournament
2	Myanmar	4	3	0	1	22	2	+20	9	
3	Iran	4	2	0	2	19	8	+11	6	
4	Singapore	4	1	0	3	1	20	−19	3	
5	Syria	4	0	0	4	0	38	−38	0	

Source: AFC
Rules for classification: Qualification tiebreakers
(H) Hosts
3 April 2017
15:00

Iran	0–2	Myanmar
	Report	July Kyaw 4'; Win Theingi Tun 45+3'

Vietnam YFT Center Field no.3, Hanoi
Attendance: 96
Referee: Qin Liang (China)
3 April 2017
18:00

Singapore	1–0	Syria
Lim 81'	Report

Vietnam YFT Center Field no.3, Hanoi
Attendance: 55
Referee: Edita Mirabidova (Uzbekistan)

5 April 2017
15:00

Singapore	0–6	Iran
	Report	Ghanbari 14'; Ghomi 15', 52'; Ghasemi 84'; Mouri 87', 90'

Vietnam YFT Center Field no.3, Hanoi
Attendance: 100
Referee: Ri Hyang-ok (North Korea)
5 April 2017
18:00

Syria	0–11	Vietnam
	Report	Nguyễn Thị Liễu 1', 45+1'; Phạm Hải Yến 6', 24'; Nguyễn Thị Tuyết Dung 13' (pen.), 38'; Nguyễn Thị Nguyệt 17'; Nguyễn Thị Hòa 20', 90'; Nguyễn Thị Muôn 71'; Nguyễn Thị Thúy Hằng 76'

Vietnam YFT Center Field no.3, Hanoi
Attendance: 300
Referee: Mi Siyu (China)

7 April 2017
15:00

Myanmar	14–0	Syria
Naw Ar Lo Wer Phaw 7', 41', 90+6'; Yee Yee Oo 19', 45+2', 76', 82'; Win Theingi Tun 25' (pen.), 38', 39', 53', 60'; Wai Wai Aung 67'; Phu Pwint Khaing 87'	Report

Vietnam YFT Center Field no.3, Hanoi
Attendance: 56
Referee: Asaka Matsushita (Japan)
7 April 2017
18:00

Vietnam	8–0	Singapore
Pang 8' (o.g.); Huỳnh Như 21' (pen.), 52', 63'; Vũ Thị Nhung 36'; Trần Thị Thùy Trang 45+1'; Nguyễn Thị Bích Thùy 67' (pen.); Nguyễn Thị Nguyệt 81'	Report

Vietnam YFT Center Field no.3, Hanoi
Attendance: 300
Referee: Edita Mirabidova (Uzbekistan)

9 April 2017
15:00

Myanmar	6–0	Singapore
Hla Yin Win 22'; Wai Wai Aung 41', 76'; Win Theingi Tun 56', 85'; Yee Yee Oo 72'	Report

Vietnam YFT Center Field no.3, Hanoi
Attendance: 55
Referee: Mi Siyu (China)
9 April 2017
18:00

Iran	1–6	Vietnam
Ghanbari 8'	Report	Nguyễn Thị Tuyết Dung 15'; Phạm Hải Yến 25', 79'; Huỳnh Như 61', 82'; Nguyễn Thị Hòa 74'

Vietnam YFT Center Field no.3, Hanoi
Attendance: 380
Referee: Ri Hyang-ok (North Korea)

11 April 2017
15:00

Syria	0–12	Iran
	Report	Ghanbari 4', 35', 66', 88'; Zohrabi Nia 13', 27', 45+1', 54', 87'; Rouzbahan 16'; Ghasemi 63'; Ghomi 90+2'

Vietnam YFT Center Field no.3, Hanoi
Attendance: 35
Referee: Mi Siyu (China)
11 April 2017
18:00

Vietnam	2–0	Myanmar
Nguyễn Thị Tuyết Dung 55'; Huỳnh Như 82'	Report

Vietnam YFT Center Field no.3, Hanoi
Attendance: 750
Referee: Qin Liang (China)

== Qualified teams ==
The following eight teams qualified for the final tournament.

Team	Qualified as	Qualified on	Previous appearances in AFC Women's Asian Cup^{1}
Jordan	Hosts	4 September 2016	1 (2014)
Japan	2014 champions	21 January 2017	15 (1977, 1981, 1986, 1989, 1991, 1993, 1995, 1997, 1999, 2001, 2003, 2006, 2008, 2010, **2014**)
Australia	2014 runners-up	21 January 2017	5 (1975, 2006, 2008, **2010**, 2014)
China	2014 third place	21 January 2017	13 (**1986**, **1989**, **1991**, **1993**, **1995**, **1997**, **1999**, 2001, 2003, **2006**, 2008, 2010, 2014)
Philippines	Group A runners-up	10 April 2017	8 (1981, 1983, 1993, 1995, 1997, 1999, 2001, 2003)
South Korea	Group B winners	11 April 2017	11 (1991, 1993, 1995, 1997, 1999, 2001, 2003, 2006, 2008, 2010, 2014)
Thailand	Group C winners	7 April 2017	15 (1975, 1977, 1981, **1983**, 1986, 1989, 1991, 1995, 1999, 2001, 2003, 2006, 2008, 2010, 2014)
Vietnam	Group D winners	11 April 2017	7 (1999, 2001, 2003, 2006, 2008, 2010, 2014)

^{1} Bold indicates champions for that year. Italic indicates hosts for that year.

== Goalscorers ==
There were 206 goals scored in 38 matches, for an average of 5.42 goals per match.

13 goals

- (Jordan) Maysa Jbarah

9 goals

- (Jordan) Stephanie Al-Naber

8 goals

- (Myanmar) Win Theingi Tun

6 goals

- (Iran) Zahra Ghanbari
- (Jordan) Shahnaz Jebreen
- (Vietnam) Huỳnh Như

5 goals

- (Iran) Sara Zohrabi
- (Myanmar) Yee Yee Oo

4 goals

- (Bahrain) Reem Al-Hashmi
- (Jordan) Luna Al-Masri
- (South Korea) Ji So-yun
- (South Korea) Lee Geum-min
- (Philippines) Sara Castañeda
- (Philippines) Hali Long
- (Philippines) Eva Madarang
- (North Korea) Kim Yun-mi
- (North Korea) Sung Hyang-sim
- (Vietnam) Nguyễn Thị Tuyết Dung
- (Vietnam) Phạm Hải Yến

3 goals

- (Bahrain) Deena Abdulrahman
- (Chinese Taipei) Yu Hsiu-chin
- (Iran) Sara Ghomi
- (South Korea) Cho So-hyun
- (South Korea) Yoo Young-a
- (Myanmar) Naw Ar Lo Wer Phaw
- (Myanmar) Wai Wai Aung
- (Uzbekistan) Lyudmila Karachik
- (Vietnam) Nguyễn Thị Hòa

2 goals

- (Bahrain) Noora Al-Dossary
- (Chinese Taipei) Michelle Pao
- (Iran) Fatemeh Ghasemi
- (Iran) Foroogh Mouri
- (Jordan) Mai Sweilem
- (South Korea) Jang Sel-gi
- (North Korea) Kim Phyong-hwa
- (North Korea) Ri Un-yong
- (North Korea) Wi Jong-sim
- (Philippines) Anicka Castañeda
- (Thailand) Suchawadee Nildhamrong
- (United Arab Emirates) Salha Rashid
- (Uzbekistan) Makhliyo Sarikova
- (Vietnam) Nguyễn Thị Liễu
- (Vietnam) Nguyễn Thị Nguyệt

1 goal

- (Bahrain) Yasmeen Fayez Tobellah
- (Hong Kong) Cheung Wai Ki
- (India) Ngangom Bala Devi
- (India) Sasmita Malik
- (India) Nongm Ratanbala Devi
- (Iran) Shaghayegh Rouzbahan
- (Jordan) Hannah Al-Kousheh
- (Jordan) Abeer Al-Nahar
- (South Korea) Kang Yu-mi
- (South Korea) Kwon Eun-som
- (South Korea) Lee Eun-mi
- (South Korea) Lee Min-a
- (South Korea) Lee So-dam
- (Myanmar) Hla Yin Win
- (Myanmar) July Kyaw
- (Myanmar) Phu Pwint Khaing
- (North Korea) Choe Un-ju
- (North Korea) Ri Hyang-sim
- (North Korea) Ri Kyong-hyang
- (Philippines) Alisha del Campo
- (Philippines) Alesa Dolino
- (Philippines) Mary Duran
- (Philippines) Irish Navaja
- (Singapore) Lim Li Xian
- (Tajikistan) Jonona Halimova
- (Tajikistan) Madinai Iskandari
- (Tajikistan) Natalia Sotnikova
- (Thailand) Kanjana Sungngoen
- (Thailand) Orathai Srimanee
- (Thailand) Rattikan Thongsombut
- (Thailand) Taneekarn Dangda
- (United Arab Emirates) Nouf Faleh
- (United Arab Emirates) Shahad Jaseem
- (United Arab Emirates) Houriya Taheri
- (Uzbekistan) Lianna Narbekova
- (Uzbekistan) Dildora Nozimova
- (Uzbekistan) Feruza Turdiboeva
- (Uzbekistan) Umida Zoirova
- (Vietnam) Nguyễn Thị Bích Thùy
- (Vietnam) Nguyễn Thị Muôn
- (Vietnam) Nguyễn Thị Thúy Hằng
- (Vietnam) Trần Thị Thùy Trang
- (Vietnam) Vũ Thị Nhung

1 own goal

- (Hong Kong) Ho Wan Tung (playing against North Korea)
- (Iraq) Zahraa Ahmed Breesam (playing against Jordan)
- (Palestine) Miral Al-Sarras (playing against Thailand)
- (Singapore) Angelyn Pang (playing against Vietnam)

Source: the-afc.com
