= Rouzbahan =

Rouzbahan is a name. People with the name include:

- Shaghayegh Rouzbahan
- Rouzbahan Fraij
