= Eva Madarang =

Filipino footballer (born 1997)

Personal information
- Full name: Eva Silva Madarang
- Date of birth: September 13, 1997 (age 29)
- Place of birth: New Jersey, U.S.
- Height: 1.60 m (5 ft 3 in)
- Positions: Right back; midfielder; striker

Youth career
- 2011–2014: Newbury Park HS

College career
Years	Team	Apps	(Gls)
2015–2016	Moorpark Raiders	45	(7)
2017–2018	Rogers State Hillcats	36	(3)

Senior career*
Years	Team	Apps	(Gls)
2019–2020	Doncaster Rovers Belles	6	(1)
2020–2021	Roma CF	10	(1)
2021	Pozoalbense	3	(0)

International career^{‡}
2017–	Philippines	49	(12)
Medal record
Women's football
Representing the Philippines
AFF Women's Championship
Winner	2022 Philippines	Team
Southeast Asian Games
Bronze medal – third place	2021 Vietnam	Team
- * Club domestic league appearances and goals as of 00:45; 23 June 2022 (UTC) ‡ National team caps and goals as of 06:19; 10 April 2023 (UTC)

Eva Silva Madarang (born September 13, 1997) is a footballer who plays as a right back. Born in the United States, she represents the Philippines at international level.

== College career ==
In college soccer, Madarang played for Moorpark College. In 2016, she was named the team's MVP. In January 2017, she was among the players who were named into the All-Western State Conference North Division first team after leading her team to a Western State North Championships. She also a two time honoree of the 100% Hustle Award. Starting September 2017, she played for the Rogers State University in NCAA Division II.

== Club career ==
=== Doncaster Rovers Belles ===
Madarang signed for Doncaster Rovers Belles in September 2019, with the two-time national champions languishing in the FA Women's National League Division One Midlands. The league's 2019–20 season was cancelled due to the COVID-19 pandemic.

=== Roma CF ===
In 2020, Madarang was signed for Roma Calcio Femminile (Roma C.F.), a A.S. Roma affiliate, of the Italian Serie B.

=== Pozoalbense ===
In July 2021, she moved to CD Pozoalbense of Spain's Segunda División Pro.

== International career ==
Madarang's father is Filipino, making her eligible to play for her father's homeland. She went to the Philippines to try out for the country's national team with low expectations but made it to the final squad that participated in the 2018 AFC Women's Asian Cup qualifiers. The Philippines qualified for the tournament final with her scoring four goals in five games as a striker. Prior to the qualifiers, she was trained in her natural position of left back.

Madarang was among the players named to the national team that participated at the 2017 Southeast Asian Games. However she sustained an injury on August 8, 2017, during a training camp in Japan, a few days before the regional tournament. The coaching staff decided not to play her so she could be fit enough to play at the 2018 AFC Women's Asian Cup.

=== International goals ===
Scores and results list the Philippines' goal tally first.

#	Date	Venue	Opponent	Score	Result	Competition
1.	April 3, 2017	Pamir Stadium, Dushanbe, Tajikistan	United Arab Emirates	1–0	4–0	2018 AFC Women's Asian Cup qualification
2.	April 3, 2017	Pamir Stadium, Dushanbe, Tajikistan	United Arab Emirates	2–0	4–0	2018 AFC Women's Asian Cup qualification
3.	April 5, 2017	Pamir Stadium, Dushanbe, Tajikistan	Iraq	1–0	4–0	2018 AFC Women's Asian Cup qualification
4.	April 7, 2017	Pamir Stadium, Dushanbe, Tajikistan	Tajikistan	1–0	8–0	2018 AFC Women's Asian Cup qualification
5.	April 9, 2019	Grand Hamad Stadium, Doha, Qatar	Palestine	3–0	7–0	2020 AFC Women's Olympic Qualifying Tournament
6.	April 9, 2019	Grand Hamad Stadium, Doha, Qatar	Palestine	4–0	7–0	2020 AFC Women's Olympic Qualifying Tournament
7.	November 29, 2019	Biñan Football Stadium, Biñan, Philippines	Malaysia	5–0	5–0	2019 Southeast Asian Games
8.	April 30, 2022	Valentine Sports Park, Sydney, Australia	Tonga	4–0	5–0	Friendly
9.	April 30, 2022	Valentine Sports Park, Sydney, Australia	Tonga	5–0	5–0	Friendly
10.	May 9, 2022	Cẩm Phả Stadium, Cẩm Phả, Vietnam	Cambodia	3–0	5–0	2021 Southeast Asian Games
11.	December 11, 2022	Wanderers Football Park, Sydney, Australia	Papua New Guinea	3–1	5–1	Friendly
12.	April 5, 2023	Hisor Central Stadium, Hisor, Tajikistan	Pakistan	3–0	4–0	2024 AFC Women's Olympic Qualifying Tournament

== Honours ==
=== International ===
==== Philippines ====
- Southeast Asian Games Bronze Medal: 2021
- AFF Women's Championship: 2022

== Education ==
In 2019, she graduated from Rogers State University in Oklahoma. In 2020, she decided to pursue a master's degree.

== Businesses and social media ==
She makes a YouTube channel called Eva's World. Her channel is not about soccer, but shows trips she took with the Philippines women's national team and videos from England when she played for a club there. To lose weight, she became a vegan, and she makes videos about eating vegan. She enjoys filming and photography. She made ESM Photographs from her name, Eva Silva Madarang. She made a clothing business called Eva's Closet.
