= Yoon Young-geul =

South Korean footballer

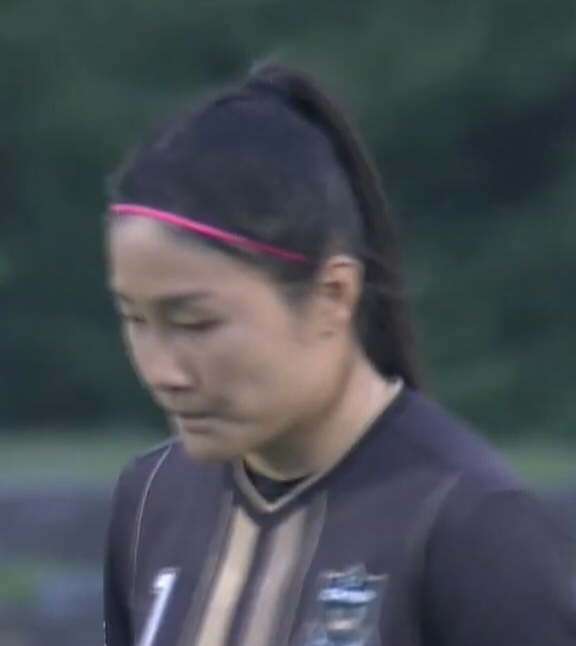
- Yoon Young-geul playing for Gyeongju KHNP in 2021

Personal information
- Date of birth: 28 October 1987 (age 39)
- Place of birth: Pyeongtaek, Gyeonggi, South Korea
- Height: 1.71 m (5 ft 7 in)
- Position: Goalkeeper

Senior career*
Years	Team	Apps	(Gls)
2008–2011	Seoul WFC		
2012–2016	Suwon UDC		
2017–2021	Gyeongju KHNP		
2022	AGF	1	(0)
2023	BK Häcken FF		

International career^{‡}
2004–2006	South Korea U20	7	(0)
2015–2023	South Korea	29	(0)
- * Club domestic league appearances and goals ‡ National team caps and goals as of 25 July 2023

Yoon Young-geul (Korean: 윤영글; born 28 October 1987) is a South Korean former footballer and coach who mostly played as a goalkeeper. With the South Korea national team, she participated at the 2015 FIFA Women's World Cup.

== Youth career ==
Yoon began playing football in the sixth grade of elementary school after a friend she met through taekwondo classes introduced her to a local football coach. She progressed through the girls' football academies at Osan Middle School, Osan Girls' I.C.T. High School, and Yeoju University. During her youth career, Yoon mostly played in various outfield positions, but she did play as goalkeeper for a short spell while at middle school.

== Club career ==
=== Early years: Seoul City WFC ===
Yoon was selected by Seoul City WFC at the women's works football new player draft in 2007, initially playing as a defender and midfielder. When the WK League was launched in 2009, Yoon only made two league appearances for Seoul due to a knee injury which forced her to rest for most of the season. After recovering from a knee surgery, Yoon began playing as a goalkeeper on the advice of coach Seo Jeong-ho, who told her that an outfield position would be worse for her knee. In 2010, she played all minutes of all of Seoul City's WK League matches as goalkeeper, but after the season ended, at her request she returned to playing as a midfielder.

=== Becoming established as a goalkeeper ===
In 2012, Yoon transferred to Suwon UDC, playing in an outfield role for one season before donning the gloves again when the team was short of goalkeepers. This time, she found herself enjoying the role, and continued playing as goalkeeper for the rest of her career. In 2017, Yoon moved to newly established team Gyeongju KHNP. She considered retiring from football but was encouraged to continue playing and competing for a place in the national team by goalkeeping coach Kim Poong-joo. As the oldest member of the squad, Yoon was a key player as KHNP qualified for the 2018 WK League championship final in only the second year since the club's foundation. With Yoon as goalkeeper, Gyeongju qualified for the league playoff for four consecutive years, playing against her former club Suwon on all four occasions.

=== Move to Europe ===
In 2022, she became the first female Korean goalkeeper to play in Europe when she signed with Danish side AGF Fodbold. Dissatisfied with the limited number of opportunities to play, Yoon requested early termination of her contract with AGF after just a few months there, and the club agreed to release her. The following year, she joined Swedish side BK Häcken on a six-month contract. Yoon retired from her playing career in late 2023, without having played in a competitive fixture for Häcken.

== International career ==
Yoon first played for South Korea at the 2004 FIFA U-19 Women's World Championship as a defender.

By this time playing as a goalkeeper, Yoon made her full international debut for South Korea in March 2015 at the Cyprus Cup in Scotland. She was part of South Korea's squad at the 2015 FIFA Women's World Cup but as the third choice goalkeeper, she didn't play any matches at the tournament. Yoon was the country's first-choice goalkeeper at the 2018 AFC Women's Asian Cup, 2018 Asian Games, and 2019 EAFF E-1 Championship, but missed out on the 2019 World Cup due to an injury. She finally achieved her dream of playing at a World Cup in 2023, appearing in South Korea's first group stage match in what would be her final appearance for the national team. During her career she made 29 A match appearances for South Korea, conceding 15 goals.

== Coaching career ==
After retiring as a player, Yoon initially stepped away from football despite colleagues and friends encouraging her to become a coach. In 2025 she returned to the sport, taking up a coaching position with the Gangwon State University women's football team.
