= Moon So-ri (footballer) =

South Korean footballer (born 1990)

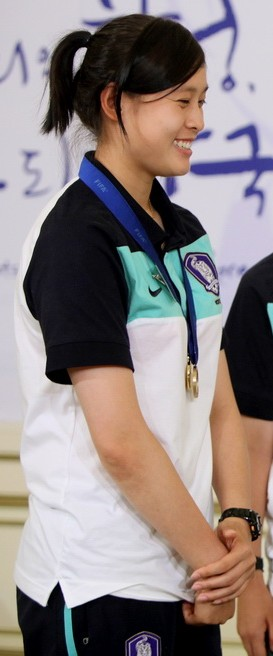

Personal information
- Full name: Moon So-ri
- Date of birth: 12 August 1990 (age 36)
- Place of birth: Goyang, South Korea
- Height: 1.75 m (5 ft 9 in)
- Position: Goalkeeper

Youth career
- 2006-2008: Dongsan I.C.T. High School
- 2009-2010: Ulsan College

Senior career*
Years	Team	Apps	(Gls)
2011	Seoul City		
2012	Chungbuk Sportstoto		

International career
2008-2010	South Korea U-20	12	(0)
2010-2011	South Korea	2	(0)
- * Club domestic league appearances and goals

Moon So-ri (Korean: 문소리; born 12 August 1990) is a South Korean former footballer who played as a goalkeeper. Once considered to be one of the rising stars of South Korean women's football, Moon retired from playing early to start a family and now works as a goalkeeping coach at the Korea Football Association.

== Playing career ==
=== Youth career ===
Moon began playing football in the playground at elementary school and asked her parents to allow her to join a team but they refused, not considering it a suitable hobby for a girl. Moon began writing daily letters to her parents, begging them to let her play and eventually they promised that she could join a football academy if she got good grades on her exams at the end of elementary school. Having satisfied their conditions, Moon began training at Changdeok Girls' Middle School in Seoul and continued her football career at Dongsan I.C.T. High School.

Moon then attended Ulsan College, training with the women's football team alongside South Korea teammates Jeong Yeong-a and Kwon Eun-som. The trio were awarded scholarships by the university after South Korea's third place finish at the 2010 FIFA U-20 Women's World Cup.

=== WK League ===
Moon was selected by Seoul City in the fifth round of the 2011 WK League new players' draft. During the 2011 season, a conflict arose between Moon and her club after Moon took time off to care for her mother, with Seoul City coaches alleging poor communication and attitude problems on Moon's part. Seoul City Hall dismissed Moon in September 2011, but Moon was unable to sign with a new club until Seoul manager Seo Jung-ho agreed to accept a letter of resignation dated 30 September and sign Moon's release papers.

Moon subsequently joined Chungbuk Sportstoto. Shortly after arriving at the club, Moon got married and then announced her pregnancy, taking early retirement from her professional footballing career.

=== International career ===
Moon was a key member of South Korea's squad at the 2010 FIFA U-20 Women's World Cup, playing in all six of the team's matches at the tournament. The team lost 5-1 to Germany in the semi-finals, but Moon was praised for her performance despite the scoreline, especially as the squad did not have a goalkeeper-specific coach. They went on to beat Colombia to finish in third place, becoming the first South Korean national team to do so at a FIFA tournament.

Following the U-20 team's success at the World Cup, Moon was called up to South Korea's senior squad for the 2010 Asian Games. She made her A match debut at the Asian Games in South Korea's group stage 5-0 win against Jordan. She made her second and final senior international appearance against Northern Ireland at the 2011 Cyprus Cup.

=== Return to amateur football and futsal ===
Having retired from football to focus on her family, Moon made a return to the pitch in 2013, playing for amateur side Ulsan WFC alongside other former players and alumni of the football academy at Ulsan College. In 2015 Moon joined Busan Kappa FC in the newly established women's division of the FK League.

== Coaching career ==
Having retired from playing, Moon turned to coaching. She qualified as a goalkeeping coach after studying at the '2013 Golden Glove Academy' at the Paju National Football Center, and in 2016 she earned her UEFA goalkeeping coaching license in Firenze, Italy. Later that year, she started working as a goalkeeping coach for the U-12 team at Seongnam FC, where she later joined the coaching staff for the U-15 side.

In addition to her UEFA license, Moon holds AFC C, B and A goalkeeping licenses as well as C and B field licenses. She has spoken about how when she first went abroad to train as a coach she was often dismissed for being Asian and a woman, and this perspective has influenced her coaching philosophy. In 2024 she became the first woman to be appointed by the Korea Football Association as a full-time goalkeeping coach. The following year she travelled to the U.S.A. with South Korea's U-15 women's team as they competed in the Nike Premier Cup.

== Personal life ==
In early 2012 Moon was subject to a flurry of media attention as she announced her forthcoming marriage on social media. On 26 May 2012 she married former footballer Kang Min-gyu, whom she had met the previous year while working together coaching a youth team following her departure from Seoul City. A few months later the couple announced that they were expecting a baby. Moon gave birth to her daughter in November 2012. Her second child was born in late 2014.
