= Ho Wan Tung =

Hong Kong football and futsal player

Personal information
- Full name: Ho Wan Tung
- Date of birth: 29 May 1996 (age 30)
- Place of birth: Kowloon, Hong Kong
- Position: Defender

Team information
- Current team: Queen's Park
- Number: 22

Senior career*
Years	Team	Apps	(Gls)
- Kitchee
2020–	Queen's Park		

International career^{‡}
2012–2014	Hong Kong U19		
2015	Hong Kong (futsal)		(0)
2016–	Hong Kong	8	(0)
- * Club domestic league appearances and goals ‡ National team caps and goals as of 15 September 2019

Ho Wan Tung (born 29 May 1996), also known as Toni Ho Wan Tung or Toni Ho, is a Hong Kong footballer who plays as a defender for Scottish club Queen's Park. She is also a futsal player, and represented Hong Kong internationally in both football and futsal.

== Club career ==
Ho Wan Tung played for Kitchee SC in Hong Kong before joining Queen's Park of the Scottish Women's Premier League in October 2020.

== International career ==
Ho Wan Tung has been capped for Hong Kong at senior level in both football and futsal. In football, she represented Hong Kong at two AFC U-19 Women's Championship qualifications (2013 and 2015), two AFC Women's Olympic Qualifying Tournament editions (2016 and 2020), the 2017 EAFF E-1 Football Championship and the 2018 AFC Women's Asian Cup qualification.

In futsal, Ho Wan Tung played for Hong Kong at the 2015 AFC Women's Futsal Championship.

== See also ==
- List of Hong Kong women's international footballers
