= Malin Reuterwall =

Swedish footballer (born 1990)

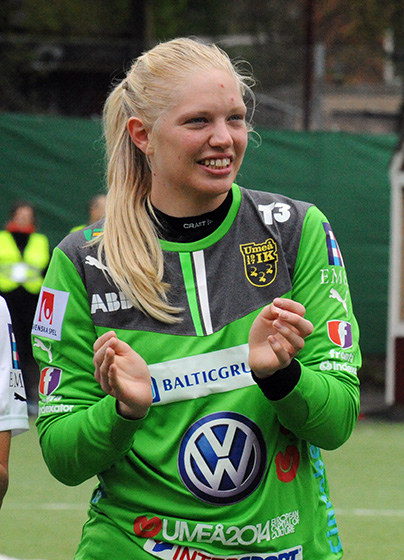
- Reuterwall playing for Umeå in May 2014

Personal information
- Full name: Malin Reuterwall
- Date of birth: 10 December 1990 (age 35)
- Place of birth: Västerås, Sweden
- Height: 1.80 m (5 ft 11 in)
- Position: Goalkeeper

Team information
- Current team: Grindavik

Youth career
- Västerås BK30

Senior career*
Years	Team	Apps	(Gls)
2007–2010	Västerås BK30		
2011–2016	Umeå IK	58	(0)
2017–	Grindavik	3	(0)

International career^{‡}
2014–	Sweden	1	(0)
- * Club domestic league appearances and goals as of 21:01, 11 December 2014 (UTC) ‡ National team caps and goals as of 21:01, 11 December 2014 (UTC)

Malin Reuterwall (born 10 December 1990) is a Swedish football goalkeeper for Grindavik of the Icelandic Urvalsdeild Kvenna. She is included in the Sweden women's national football team.

== Club career ==
Reuterwall began her career with local club BK30, playing in the first-team at age of 16. In April 2011 Umeå signed Reuterwall, on the recommendation of national team goalkeeper coach Elisabeth Leidinge. She joined Umeå in preference to several other interested clubs, where she became the regular understudy to the experienced Caroline Jönsson.

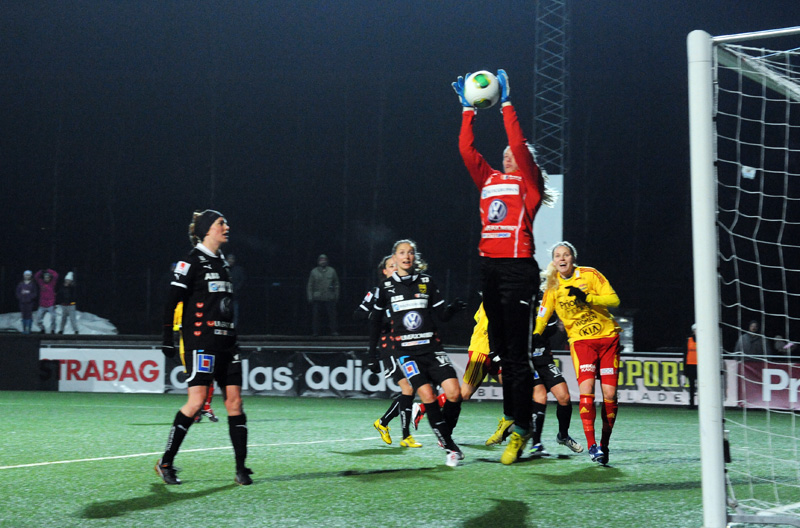
Taking a catch against Tyresö in 2013

Umeå secured Reuterwall's services for another season when she extended her contract with the club in December 2014.

== International career ==
In September 2013 coach Pia Sundhage gave Reuterwall her debut call-up to the national team, for a home World Cup qualifying match against Poland. At that point Reuterwall had won eight caps for Sweden at the U23 level. Her first experience at the international level was gained as Sweden's third-choice goalkeeper at the 2010 FIFA U-20 Women's World Cup.

Reuterwall won her debut senior cap in a 1–1 draw with Canada in November 2014.
