= Alaba Jonathan =

Nigerian footballer

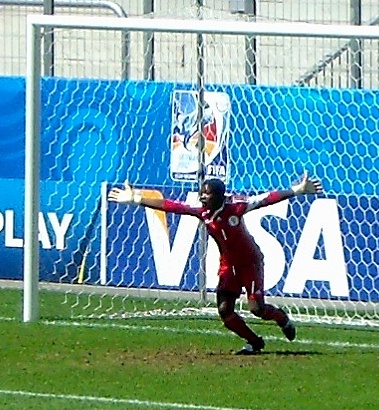
- Jonathan at the 2010 FIFA U-20 Women's World Cup

Personal information
- Full name: Alaba Jonathan
- Date of birth: 1 June 1992 (age 34)
- Place of birth: Calabar, Nigeria
- Height: 1.67 m (5 ft 6 in)
- Position: Goalkeeper

Team information
- Current team: Pelican Stars
- Number: 16

Senior career*
Years	Team	Apps	(Gls)
- Pelican Stars
- Bayelsa Queens

International career
- Nigeria U-20
- Nigeria
- * Club domestic league appearances and goals

Alaba Jonathan (born 1 June 1992 Calabar, Nigeria) is a Nigerian footballer who plays as a goalkeeper for Pelican Stars.

== Career ==
=== Development ===
Alaba Jonathan began her career in the youth of the Navy Angels. After she failed to qualify for the senior team of the Navy Angels, she moved to the Pelican Stars in spring 2010 where she remains under contract.

=== National team ===
Jonathan is a member of Nigeria's national team and has played at least once for the team. Jonathan represented her home country as a third goalkeeper at the 2011 FIFA Women's World Cup in Germany. Previously in 2010, she participated in the U-20 World Cup for the Nigeria U-20's.

She was shortlisted by coach Thomas Dennerby to be among the 27 women's team that will feature in the 2019 Fifa Women's World Cup in Austria.

== International career ==
Alaba Jonathan was in goal as the Falconets reached the final of the 2010 FIFA U-20 Women’s World Cup in Germany. It was the first time an African team would play in the final of a major FIFA women’s tournament, a feat the Falconets repeated in 2014 in Canada. Alaba went on to feature for the Super Falcons and was in goal when the team won the Africa Women’s Cup of Nations in Cameroon in 2016.

Senior Level & Super Falcons:

Nigeria’s Super Falcons on Saturday emerged African champions with a hard-earned victory over Cameroon. The Falcons’ 1-0 defeat of the Lionesses ensured that they retained the AWCON title they won two years ago. The match proved to be a particularly stern test for the Nigerian team. The Cameroonians created several chances; goalkeeper Jonathan Alaba was called to action on a number of occasions, as the Lionesses tried in vain to break the deadlock

== Club career ==
Bayelsa Queens FC: Super 4 champion and Bayelsa Queens goalkeeper Alaba Jonathan says her performance during the competition was her response to questions whether she was ready for a bigger role as a national team player.
