= Mirelle Arciniega =

Mexican footballer (born 1992)

Personal information
- Full name: Mirelle Arciniega Sevenello
- Date of birth: 13 August 1992 (age 34)
- Place of birth: Puebla, Puebla, Mexico
- Height: 1.62 m (5 ft 4 in)
- Position: Attacking midfielder

Team information
- Current team: Atlas U-19 (Manager)

Senior career*
Years	Team	Apps	(Gls)
2018–2022	Puebla	104	(8)
2022	Cruz Azul	15	(1)
2023–2024	Querétaro	18	(0)

International career^{‡}
2010	Mexico U-20	4	(0)
2020	Mexico	3	(1)

Managerial career
- 2024–2025: Puebla U-19
- 2025–: Atlas U-19
- * Club domestic league appearances and goals as of 23 February 2020 ‡ National team caps and goals as of 5 March 2020

Mirelle Arciniega Sevenello (born 13 August 1992) is a former Mexican footballer who last played as an attacking midfielder for Liga MX Femenil side Querétaro and the Mexico women's national team.

== International career ==
Arciniega represented Mexico at the 2010 CONCACAF Women's U-20 Championship and the 2010 FIFA U-20 Women's World Cup. She made her senior debut on 5 March 2020 in a 1–1 friendly draw against Croatia.
