= Fafali Dumehasi =

Ghanaian footballer

Personal information
- Date of birth: 25 December 1993 (age 32)
- Position: Goalkeeper

Senior career*
Years	Team	Apps	(Gls)
- Police Accra

International career
- Ghana
- * Club domestic league appearances and goals

Fafali Dumehasi (born 25 December 1993) is a Ghanaian footballer who plays as a goalkeeper for the Ghana women's national football team. She was part of the team at the 2014 African Women's Championship. At the club level, she played for Police Accra in Ghana.

She announced her retirement from the national team on 10 March 2023.
