= Kang Yu-mi (footballer) =

South Korean footballer (born 1991)

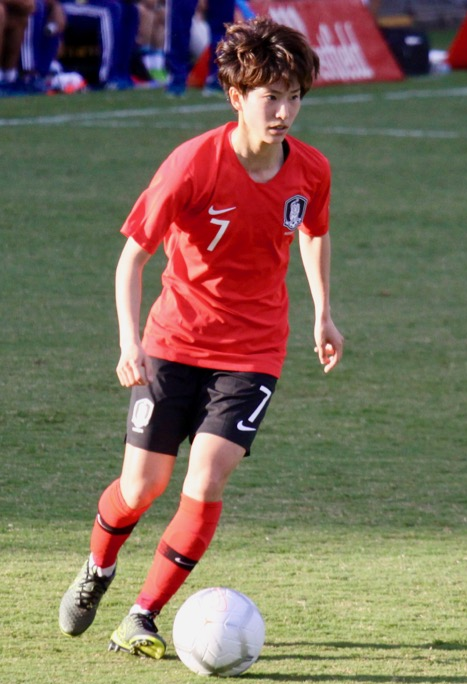

Personal information
- Date of birth: 5 October 1991 (age 35)
- Place of birth: Tokyo, Japan
- Height: 1.63 m (5 ft 4 in)
- Positions: Midfielder; forward

Team information
- Current team: Seoul WFC
- Number: 15

Youth career
- Dongsan Information Industry High School
- Hanyang Women's University

Senior career*
Years	Team	Apps	(Gls)
2012	Chungnam Ilhwa Chunma	0	(0)
2013–2014	Incheon Hyundai Steel Red Angels	0	(0)
2015–2019	Hwacheon KSPO	0	(0)
2020-2023	Gyeongju KHNP WFC	16	(3)
2024	Changnyeong WFC		
2025-	Seoul WFC		

International career^{‡}
2008–2010	South Korea U20	7	(6)
2015–	South Korea	28	(8)
- * Club domestic league appearances and goals ‡ National team caps and goals as of 07:24, 6 January 2026 (UTC)

- Kang Yu-mi
- Hangul: 강유미
- RR: Gang Yumi
- MR: Kang Yumi

Kang Yu-mi (Korean: 강유미, Korean pronunciation: [kaŋ.ju.mi]; born 5 October 1991) is a South Korean footballer who plays as a midfielder or a forward for WK League side Seoul WFC and the South Korea national team.

== Early life ==
Kang grew up in Tokyo as a third generation Zainichi Korean, where she went by the name Ōmura Hiromi (Japanese: 大村 裕美). At middle school she was close friends with Haruka Nakagawa, who went on to become a member of idol group AKB48. Kang began playing football at age 9 when she joined a football club for children of Korean descent. At age 14, she trained with the South Korea U-17 squad for the first time upon the recommendation of football officials working within Korean communities in Japan.

Kang moved to South Korea on her own at the age of 17 to attend Dongsan Information Industry High School in Seoul on a sports scholarship. After graduating from high school, she attended Hanyang Women's University.

== Club career ==
Kang participated in the 2012 WK League new player draft, where she was selected in the first round by Chungnam Ilhwa Chunma. When the club was disbanded at the end of the season, Kang moved to Incheon Hyundai Steel Red Angels. After two seasons and two WK League titles with the Red Angels, she transferred to Hwacheon KSPO in 2015.

After five years with KSPO, Kang sought opportunities to play overseas, and was preparing to return to Japan when she received an offer from Gyeongju KHNP manager Song Ju-hee and opted to stay in the WK League. In 2024, Kang played for Changnyeong WFC, before transferring again, this time to Seoul City, ahead of the 2025 season.

== International career ==
Kang was part of the under-20 team that finished runners-up at the 2009 AFC U-19 Women's Championship and third at the 2010 FIFA U-20 Women's World Cup. On 5 April 2015, she made her senior debut in a 1–0 win over Russia. She was a surprise inclusion in South Korea's squad for the 2015 FIFA Women's World Cup in Canada but was in the starting eleven for all three group matches, recording two assists to help the team progress to the knockout stage of the tournament for the first time. On 4 June 2016, she scored her first international goal in a 5–0 victory against Myanmar. Kang also played at the 2019 FIFA Women's World Cup in France.

== International goals ==
No.	Date	Venue	Opponent	Score	Result	Competition
1	4 June 2016	YTC Stadium, Myanmar	Myanmar	2-0	5-0	Friendly
2	7 June 2016	YTC Stadium, Myanmar	Myanmar		4-1	Friendly
3	8 November 2016	Hong Kong Football Club, Hong Kong	Guam	8–0	13–0	2017 EAFF E-1 Football Championship (qualification)
4	14 November 2016	Hong Kong Football Club, Hong Kong	Chinese Taipei	2–0	9–0	2017 EAFF E-1 Football Championship (qualification)
5	14 November 2016	Hong Kong Football Club, Hong Kong	Chinese Taipei	6–0	9–0	2017 EAFF E-1 Football Championship (qualification)
6	6 March 2017	Ammochostos Stadium, Larnaca, Cyprus	New Zealand	1–0	2–0	2017 Cyprus Women's Cup
7	5 April 2017	Kim Il-Sung Stadium, Pyongyang, North Korea	India	1–0	10–0	2018 AFC Women's Asian Cup qualification
8	15 December 2017	Fukuda Denshi Arena, Chiba, Japan	China	1–2	1–3	2017 EAFF E-1 Football Championship

== Honours ==
=== Club ===
Incheon Hyundai Steel Red Angels

- WK League: 2013, 2014
