= Jujuba Cardozo =

Brazilian footballer (born 1991)

Personal information
- Full name: Juliana Aparecida Paulino Cardozo
- Date of birth: 6 September 1991 (age 35)
- Height: 1.70 m (5 ft 7 in)
- Position: Defender

Team information
- Current team: Granada

Juliana Aparecida Paulino Cardozo (born 6 September 1991), known as Jujuba Cardozo, is a Brazilian football player who played as a defender for the Liga F side SD Eibar. In 2023, Cardozo signed for Granada.
