= Foroogh Mouri =

Iranian footballer (born 1989)

Personal information
- Full name: Foroogh Mouri
- Date of birth: 30 September 1989 (age 37)
- Place of birth: Shushtar, Khuzestan, Iran
- Height: 1.68 m (5 ft 6 in)
- Position: Forward

Team information
- Current team: Vachan Kurdistan
- Number: 19

Senior career*
Years	Team	Apps	(Gls)
- Vachan Kurdistan

International career^{‡}
2017–	Iran	6	(2)
- * Club domestic league appearances and goals ‡ National team caps and goals as of 9 April 2019

Foroogh Mouri (Persian: فروغ موری; born 30 September 1989) is an Iranian footballer who plays as a forward for Kowsar Women Football League club Vachan Kurdistan and the Iran women's national team.

== International goals ==
No.	Date	Venue	Opponent	Score	Result	Competition
1.	5 April 2017	Vietnam YFT Center, Hanoi, Vietnam	Singapore	5–0	6–0	2022 AFC Women's Asian Cup qualification
2.	5 April 2017	Vietnam YFT Center, Hanoi, Vietnam	Singapore	6–0	6–0	2022 AFC Women's Asian Cup qualification
