= Elin Borg =

Swedish football defender (born 1990)

Personal information
- Date of birth: 27 February 1990 (age 36)
- Place of birth: Sweden
- Position: Defender

Team information
- Current team: Södersnäckornas BK

Senior career*
Years	Team	Apps	(Gls)
2011	Linköping	7	(0)
2011	Linköping Kenty	15	(0)
2012	AIK	22	(0)
2013	Kristianstad	8	(0)
2014–2015	Djurgården	47	(1)
2018–2019	Södersnäckornas BK		
- * Club domestic league appearances and goals as of 7 September 2016

Elin Borg (born 27 February 1990) is a Swedish football defender who currently plays for Södersnäckornas BK. She has played Damallsvenskan football for Linköpings FC, AIK, Kristianstads DFF.
