= Ayano Dozono =

Japanese footballer (born 1990)

Personal information
- Date of birth: 27 March 1990 (age 36)
- Place of birth: Ichiki, Miyazaki, Japan
- Height: 1.64 m (5 ft 5 in)
- Position: Defender

Ayano Dozono (27 March 1990) is a Japanese footballer who played for Málaga.

== Career ==
Donzono began her football career playing for Urawa Red Diamonds who she played for between 2008 and 2014. During this period Donzono won 2 Japanese championships.

In June 2015, Orca Kamogawa FC returned to play professional football. By the end of 2014 Donzono retired for a second time.

After retiring for a second time, Donzoa decided to come out of retirement and try to play professional football in Spain and decided to join UD Granadilla Tenerife. However, due to his own injury, she moved to Santa Teresa CD of the Spanish Women's Second Division. In the 2019-2020 season, he moved to Málaga CFF.
