= Ashtown Ladies F.C. =

Football club in Ghana

- Full name: Ashtown Ladies Football Club
- Ground: WESCO Park, Kumasi
- League: Ghana Women’s Premier League

Ashtown Ladies Football Club is a Ghanaian professional women's football club based in the heart Ashtown in Kumasi in the Ashanti Region of Ghana. The club is founded on the principles of inclusivity, empowerment, and excellence and strive to create an environment where female athletes of all ages and backgrounds can develop their skills, build lasting friendships, and become positive role models in our community. The club features in the Ghana Women’s Premier League. Their rivals are Fabulous Ladies and Kumasi Sports Academy Ladies.

== Grounds ==
The club plays their home matches at the Wesley College of Education (WESCO) Park in Kumasi.

== History ==
Ash-Town Ladies football club has a history that reflects a commitment to women’s football, community engagement, and empowerment. The club began through social gathering, then 31 December Revolution Sporting games under the auspices of the late Mr. W.H. Yeboah who was the Ashanti Regional Secretary (Minister), when a group of individuals came together with a shared vision of creating a women’s football club that could make a difference in the Garden City of Ghana.

== Foundation and early years ==
Ash-Town Ladies Football Club was founded by the elderly women who were at the forefront of the games especially those from Ashanti–New–Town (AshTown) community of Garden City, Kumasi close to Manhyia Palace. Namely: Nana Abena Kuffour, Chairperson, Madam Abena Ateaa who doubled as first captain and goalkeeper of the club and also the mother of (Sammy Osei Kuffour of Bayern Munchen fame) Nana Ama Congress, Mrs. Regina AsafoAgyei, Sister Georgina, Mrs. Owusu-Ansah, with abled-technical team head by Nana Kwame Poku, Now Otumfuo Ntahirahene (Nana Opoku Obrempong), Mr. Adolf Mensah, Kofi John. Mr. Kwame Poku Boateng (Super BorguƐ) team manager had the foresight to recruit young girls and ladies to solidify the team. Some of the pioneer young players included Adwoa Konadu alias Agasco (U.S.A), Joyce Gyimah alias Kobo (USA), Akosua Peprah, Akua Birago (Italy), Akua Nyarko alias O. Ansah, Holland, Cynthia Frimpong (Canada), Adwoa Amponsah, (London) Adjoa Agyeiwaa, Naa Ohuo, Gladys Achiaa Adu (Zico), Esther Osei-Mensah alias Ember (Holland), Monica Abankwa Serwaa Akoto, (Germany) Becky Boateng alias Gaddafi (Norway), Mavis Akosua Addai, Silvia Adusei and Esther Nkansah, Diana Appiah alias Little Ayipey, Hannah Osei and Enterprising Madam Abiba Attah who was introduced to the team by Madam Yaa Duku and Agasco and became the full time captain of the club. On 31 August 1985, Ash-Town Ladies Football Club was officially formed at KONADU-YIADOM SCHOOL PARK, ASHANTINEW-TOWN (Ash-Town).

As the club was first of its kind to be formed in the country and during Ghana Broadcasting Corporation (GBC) 50th anniversary celebration the team’s performance attracted people of all walks of life to watch them, even during their training sessions at Konadu-Yiadom school park. As Akan Say "ƆBAA TƆ TUA ETWENE BEMA BO" prominent personalities of Ashanti-New-Town were appointed to steer the affairs of the club namely Nana Osei Boakye Mensah as Chairman of the club, former chairman of NPP Manhyia constituency and chief agent of Ashanti Region newspapers vendors Nana Akwasi, vice, Mr. Jerry King, Mr. Joe Adu, Nana Druyeh, Mr. Donkor of Ghana Police Service, Kumasi, Mr. Osei Kwadwo alias Spearman, Mr. Yaw Nkrumah, Mr. Kwadwo Afriyie (Lokko), Mr. Yamoah Ponko (Father Cozy), Mr. Osman Eshun. Ash-Town ladies football club began to play matches against both clubs of age 16 and 17 across the country especially during festivals and school vacations.

In February 1986, Ash-Town ladies football club had to give NLA ladies club the baptismal of fire under coach Kwao Philips, former player of Great Ashantis football club in two separate matches (7-1) and (2-1) respectively. In attendance was Ashanti Regional Secretary (Minister) Mr. Will Yeboah and high dignities in the region. The Regional Secretary honoured the Management, and Executives and playing body at Residency during Ghana’s 29th Independence anniversary celebration to a cocktail party. The club became a household name in Ghana. AshTown ladies football club received an international invitation in February 1987, to a special competition in Abidjan la Cote d’Ivoire through an initiative of Messrs Jafaru and Amanquah of Berekum and Adebayo Yahaya of Asec Mimosa ladies. On the way to La Cote d’Ivoire, then first ever Black Queens goalkeeper Dora Zutah, Zinabu Nabuzire joined the team. To crown the competition as winners Ash-Town ladies football club beat Stella club of Abidjan (2-0), Asec Mimosa ladies (1-0) and drew (1-1) with Ivorian women national team. With the help of Mr. E.A. Paintsil, father of sports Broadcaster and Commentator Papa Zomelo Paintsil then Regional sports organizer of NSC (NSA) the club was allowed to play curtain raiser matches at Kumasi sports Stadium now Baba Yara Sports stadium.

In advert of the rise of women football across the world after FIFA maiden women world cup tournament in 1991, in China. Ash-Town Ladies football club split into two that is current Ash-Town ladies football club was metamorphosed in three phases. First the club went to Ilorin-Kwara State, Nigeria in 1991 with the name FABULOUS LADIES FOOTBALL CLUB to win 8-club-1st YSFON GIRLS.

== Founders ==
Founders and pacesetters of the game were Nana Abena Kuffour, (Chairperson), Madam Abena Ateaa, Nana Osei Boakye Mensah, (Chairman), Mr. Kwame Poku Boateng (Super BoguƐ), Mr. Charles Amoah alias Char-Char (Nana Obrempong Mensah of Mim Abidjanhene. Mr. Boadi and Mr. Richard Effah Amponsah (Wango).

== International Tournaments ==
In 1992, when Ghana Football Association officially introduced women football in the country through FIFA's and CAF's directive the league was played on region basis (Accra & Kumasi). To usher the Ashanti Regional league, gala matches were organized and two FABULOUS CLUBS appeared as Fabulous ladies No. 1 and Fabulous ladies No 2. After the gala the late Messrs George Dramani and Charles Aryee, Regional sports, organizer and administrator respectively had to persuade the original Fabulous ladies football club that won Ilorin-Kwara state, Nigeria tournament to change their name and hence the name of Goldfields ladies football club. In 2012, the GFA under Mr. Kwasi Nyantakyi revived women football, a semi-professional women football league took a national dimension into two zones (Southern or Northern). Six-participation-clubs at each zone and at the end of the season, League leaders played to be declared national champion. Then the executives reverted to the original name which is synonym to women football Ash-Town ladies football club and Ash-Town ladies football is women football.
