= Yeoju Institute of Technology =

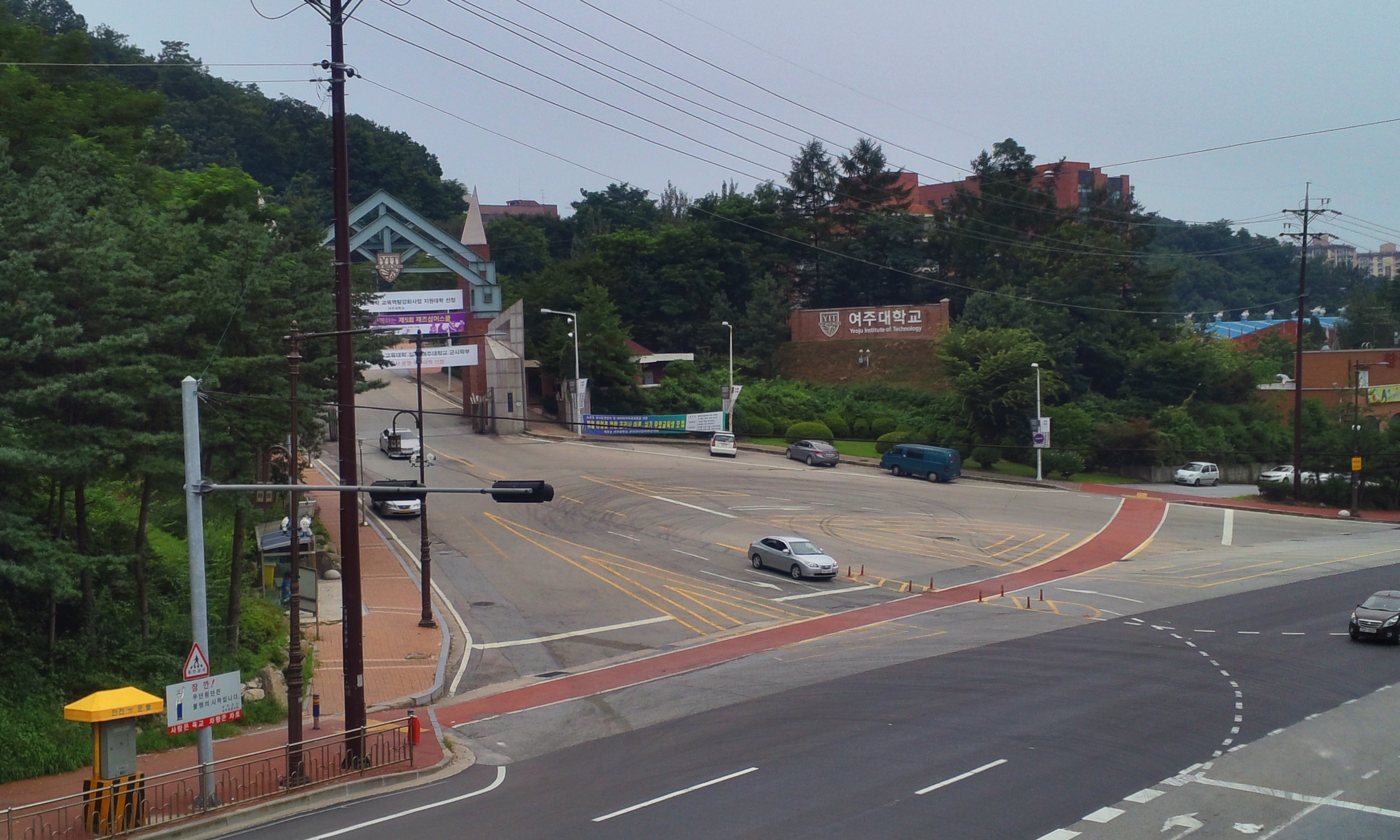
- Main gate of Yeoju Institute of Technology (2013)

Korean name
- Hangul: 여주대학
- Hanja: 驪州大學
- RR: Yeoju daehak
- MR: Yŏju taehak

Yeoju Institute of Technology (or YIT) is a private higher educational institution in Sejong-ro, Yeoju-si, Gyeonggi-do, South Korea. As of 2012, the status of the institution has changed to a university. Several four-year programs have been established such as the school's nursing program. Yeoju University has begun to develop an international studies program. A big number of students from China, Uzbekistan, Mongolia, and Burma have enrolled. These students mainly attend the college for Korean language training. Yeoju University is known for its educational programs in Architecture, Civil engineering, Renewable energy development, Management and marketing.

There are many "foreign instructors and professors" employed at institute. A small extension campus is located in neighboring Icheon City, at a Hyundai/ KCC plant. The school has a strong focus on automotive technology, but offers training in a variety of other fields, including ceramic design, a field which is of considerable economic importance in Yeoju and Icheon.

== History ==
The school was established by the Dongshin Educational Foundation. Governmental permission was received in 1992. The school admitted its first entering class in March 1993. It was known at that time as Yeoju Industrial Technical College, taking its present name two years later in 1995. The first international sisterhood relationship was established in the intervening year (1994), with Salt Lake Community College in the United States.

== Sister colleges ==
In addition to Salt Lake Community College, YIT maintains relationships with schools in several countries. These include Houghton College and Utah Valley University in the United States, British Columbia Institute of Technology in Canada, the University of Leicester in the United Kingdom, the University of Newcastle in Australia, Osaka Industrial University in Japan, and Kyung Hee University in Korea.

== See also ==
- Education in South Korea
- List of colleges and universities in South Korea
