= Kwon Eun-som =

South Korean footballer (born 1990)

Personal information
- Full name: Kwon Eun-som
- Date of birth: 13 November 1990 (age 35)
- Place of birth: South Korea
- Height: 1.53 m (5 ft 0 in)
- Position: Midfielder

Team information
- Current team: Suwon FC
- Number: 17

Youth career
- 2003-2005: Seolbong Middle School
- 2006-2008: Janghowon High School
- 2009: Ulsan College

Senior career*
| Years | Team | Apps | (Gls) |
| 2010 | INAC Kobe Leonessa | | |
| 2011-2017 | Icheon Daekyo | | |
| 2018- | Suwon FC | | |

International career^{‡}
| 2008-2010 | South Korea U20 | 12 | (6) |
| 2009 | South Korea Universiade | 4 | (0) |
| 2010- | South Korea | 16 | (4) |
- * Club domestic league appearances and goals ‡ National team caps and goals as of 04:35, 13 May 2026 (UTC)

Kwon Eun-som (Korean: 권은솜; born 13 November 1990) is a South Korean footballer who plays as a midfielder for WK League club Suwon FC and the South Korea women's national team.

== Club career ==
In late 2010, Kwon signed with Japanese side INAC Kobe Leonessa, becoming the third Korean woman to play football professionally in Japan. After winning the 2011 Nadeshiko League with INAC Kobe, Kwon returned to South Korea and joined Goyang Daekyo. With Daekyo, Kwon won her first WK League title in 2012. She also played in the 2012 WK League all-star match.

Following the disbandment of Icheon Daekyo in 2017, Kwon joined Suwon UDC. The club merged with the existing Suwon FC in 2022 and was rebranded as Suwon FC Women. Suwon finished as WK League runners-up in 2023 before lifting the trophy in 2024, qualifying for the 2025-26 AFC Women's Champions League. Kwon was named Player of the Match after Suwon beat defending champions Wuhan Jiangda 0–4 in the quarter-finals of the competition.

== International career ==
=== South Korea U-20 ===
Kwon was part of the South Korean squad that came in third place at the 2010 FIFA U-20 Women's World Cup, the first South Korean team to finish third in a FIFA tournament. Kwon provided the assist for Ji So-yun to score the winning goal in the third-place play-off match against Colombia at the tournament.

=== South Korea ===
Having made her full international debut at the 2010 Peace Queen Cup, Kwon was selected to play at the 2010 Asian Games, where she scored her first international goal in South Korea's group stage match against Jordan. South Korea went on to win the bronze medal at the tournament.

== Career statistics ==
List of international goals scored by Kwon Eun-som
| No. | Date | Venue | Opponent | Score | Result | Competition | Ref. |
|---|---|---|---|---|---|---|---|
| 1. | 16 November 2010 | University Town Stadium, Guangzhou, China | Jordan | 3–0 | 5–0 | 2010 Asian Games | |
| 2. | 8 November 2016 | Hong Kong Football Club Stadium, Hong Kong | Guam | 11–0 | 13–0 | 2017 EAFF E-1 Football Championship qualification | |
| 3. | 11 November 2016 | Hong Kong Football Club Stadium, Hong Kong | Hong Kong | 10–0 | 14–0 | 2017 EAFF E-1 Football Championship qualification | |
| 4. | 9 April 2017 | Kim Il-sung Stadium, Pyongyang, North Korea | Hong Kong | 4–0 | 6–0 | 2018 AFC Women's Asian Cup qualification | |

== Honours ==
=== INAC Kobe Leonessa ===
- Nadeshiko League
  - Champions: 2011

=== Icheon Daekyo (previously Goyang Daekyo) ===
- WK League
  - Champions: 2012
  - Runners-up: 2014, 2015, 2016

=== Suwon FC Women ===
- WK League
  - Champions: 2024
  - Runners-up: 2023

=== South Korea U-20 ===
- FIFA U-20 Women's World Cup
  - Third place: 2010

=== South Korea ===
- Asian Games
  - Third place: 2010
