= Gangwon State University =

University in South Korea

Gangwon Provincial University
- Motto: 진리, 창조, 봉사 "Truth, Creativity, Service"
- Type: Public
- Established: 1998
- President: Song Seung-cheol
- Location: Gangneung, Gangwon-do; 37°52′38″N 128°49′45″E
- Campus: Urban
- Website: gw.ac.kr

- Gangwon State University
- Hangul: 강원도립대학교
- Hanja: 江原道立大學校
- RR: Gangwon dorip daehakgyo
- MR: Kangwŏn torip taehakkyo

Gangwon Provincial University (Korean: 강원도립대학) is a public college in Gangneung City, Gangwon Province, South Korea. Unlike most public tertiary institutions in South Korea, it is administered directly by the provincial government of Gangwon-do.

== Campus ==
The college is located in Jumunjin-eup, north of Gangneung's city center. It lies close to the Yeongdong Expressway.

== History ==
Permission to establish the college was granted in 1995, and construction began in 1997. The first students were admitted in March 1998. In 2015, an evaluation by the Ministry of Education rated the college in the lowest E group, resulting in the Ministry halting its monetary support and barring the college from all state-funded programs.

== Organization ==
The president of GPU reports directly to the governor of Gangwon Province. The president oversees the college's four divisions: Natural Science, Engineering, Human and Social Science, and Physical Education. Under these four divisions, there are a total of 13 departments.

- Marine Police & Technology, Marine Life Sciences, Food Processing & Bakery,
- Cadastral Science & Real Estate, Tourism, Child Education & Care, Civil Engineering, Information & Communication,
- Automotive Engineering, Industrial Design, Fire-Environmental & Disaster Prevention, Digital Contents Techniques,
- Leisure Sports.

== Students and faculty ==
As of February 2010, the school has about 1,400 students, 33 full-time professors, 13 adjunct professors and over 90 part-time lecturers. A total of about 3,500 students had graduated from the school, as of 2010.

== Cooperation with local community ==
GPC has, since its inception, worked together with the local community. The campus itself is open to the general public, and the school's departments have closely linked with local industries. For example, the college has a leading role in establishing a ‘Jumunjin Brand Squid’, whose name ‘Jumunjingeo’ combines the name of the town as well as the Korean word for fish. In Jumunjin, the most well known marine animal is squid.

== See also ==
- List of national universities in South Korea
- List of universities and colleges in South Korea
- Education in Korea
- Kangwon National University
