= Jeong Yeong-a =

South Korean footballer

Jeong Yeong-a 정영아
Personal information
- Date of birth: 9 December 1990 (age 35)
- Place of birth: Ulsan, South Korea
- Height: 1.68 m (5 ft 6 in)
- Position: Defender

Team information
- Current team: Gyeonju KHNP
- Number: 22

Youth career
- Hyundai Cheongun Middle School
- Ulsan Technical High School
- Ulsan College

Senior career*
Years	Team	Apps	(Gls)
2011–2013	Seoul WFC		
2014–2015	Daejeon Sportstoto		
2016–2017	Icheon Daekyo		
2018–2024	Gyeongju KHNP	37	(0)
2026–	Gyeongju KHNP	0	(0)

International career^{‡}
2008–2010	South Korea U20	10	(0)
2013–2022	South Korea	16	(0)
- * Club domestic league appearances and goals ‡ National team caps and goals as of 06:10, 20 March 2026 (UTC)

Jeong Yeong-a (born 9 December 1990) is a South Korean women's footballer who plays as a defender for Gyeongju KHNP and the South Korea women's national team.

== Early life ==
Jeong was born in Ulsan and began playing football while in the fifth grade at Seobu Elementary School. She was scouted while participating in a 7-a-side football tournament hosted by Ulsan College, and went on to play for Hyundai Cheongun Middle School, Ulsan Technical High School, and Ulsan College.

== Club career ==
Jeong was selected by Seoul WFC in the second round of the 2011 WK League rookie draft, signing a three-year contract with the team. From 2014-15 Jeong played for Daejeon Sportstoto.

Ahead of the 2016 season, she transferred to Icheon Daekyo, where she played as a central defender alongside Park Eun-seon. Following the dissolution of Icheon Daekyo, Jeong was signed by Gyeongju KHNP. Before the start of the 2020 season, she suffered a torn ligament in her left knee, requiring three surgeries and leaving her unable to play football for a year.

== International career ==
Jeong played ten matches for the South Korea U20 team between 2008 and 2010 and was a member of the squad that finished third in the 2010 FIFA U-20 Women's World Cup. She made her full international debut on 12 January 2013 in a friendly against Norway.
