= Shaghayegh Rouzbahan =

Iranian footballer (born 1994)

Shaqayeq Rouzbahan
Personal information
- Full name: Shaqayeq Rouzbahan
- Date of birth: 6 December 1994 (age 31)
- Place of birth: Qaem Shahr, Iran
- Position: Midfielder

Team information
- Current team: Sepahan Isfahan
- Number: 17

Senior career*
Years	Team	Apps	(Gls)
- Sepahan Isfahan

International career^{‡}
2012	Iran U19		(1)
2013–	Iran	9	(1)
- * Club domestic league appearances and goals ‡ National team caps and goals as of 9 April 2019

Shaqayeq Rouzbahan (Persian: شقایق روزبهان; born 6 December 1994) is an Iranian footballer who plays as a midfielder for Kowsar Women Football League club Sepahan SC and the Iran women's national team.

== International goals ==
No.	Date	Venue	Opponent	Score	Result	Competition
1.	11 April 2017	Vietnam YFT Center, Hanoi, Vietnam	Syria	3–0	12–0	2018 AFC Women's Asian Cup qualification
