= 2022–23 WE League =

Second season of the top Japanese women's association football league

WE League
- Season: 2022–23
- Dates: 22 October 2022 – 11 June 2023
- Champions: Urawa Red Diamonds; 1st WE League title 5th Japanese title
- AFC Club Championship: Urawa Red Diamonds
- Matches: 110
- Goals: 287 (2.61 per match)
- Top goalscorer: Riko Ueki (Tokyo Verdy Beleza) (14 goals)
- Biggest home win: Tokyo Verdy Beleza 9–0 Chifure AS Elfen Saitama (14 May 2023)
- Biggest away win: MyNavi Sendai 0–4 Omiya Ardija Ventus (26 November 2022)
- Highest scoring: Tokyo Verdy Beleza 9–0 Chifure AS Elfen Saitama (14 May 2023)
- Highest attendance: Urawa Red Diamonds 3–2 AC Nagano Parceiro; 4,604 (23 October 2022)
- Lowest attendance: Chifure AS Elfen Saitama 0–3 AC Nagano Parceiro; 434 (18 March 2023)
- Total attendance: 154,141
- Average attendance: 1,401

The 2022–23 WE League, also known as the 2022–23 Yogibo WE League (Japanese: 2022–23 Yogibo WEリーグ, Hepburn: 2022–23 Yogibo WE Rīgu) for sponsorship reasons, was the 2nd season of the WE League, the top Japanese women's professional league for association football clubs, since its establishment in 2020.

== Overview ==
This season was the last in the 11 team format, as the WE League expanded to 12 teams from the 2023–24 season.

== Teams ==
Locations of the 2022–23 WE League teams
Locations of the WE League teams in and near Tokyo

Team	Location	Ground	Capacity	2021–22 season
AC Nagano Parceiro	Nagano, Nagano	Nagano U Stadium	15,491	7th
Albirex Niigata	Niigata, Niigata	Denka Big Swan Stadium	42,300	8th
Albirex Niigata	Niigata, Niigata	Niigata Athletic Stadium	18,671	8th
AS Elfen Saitama	Kumagaya, Saitama	Kumagaya Athletic Stadium	15,392	11th
INAC Kobe Leonessa	Kobe, Hyōgo	Noevir Stadium Kobe	30,132	1st
JEF United Chiba	Chiba, Chiba	Fukuda Denshi Arena	19,781	4th
JEF United Chiba	Ichihara, Chiba	ZA Oripri Stadium	14,051	4th
MyNavi Sendai	Sendai, Miyagi	Yurtec Stadium Sendai	19,694	5th
Nojima Stella Sagamihara	Sagamihara, Kanagawa	Sagamihara Gion Stadium	15,300	10th
Omiya Ardija Ventus	Saitama, Saitama	NACK5 Stadium Omiya	15,500	9th
Sanfrecce Hiroshima Regina	Hiroshima, Hiroshima	Hiroshima Koiki Park Football Stadium	6,000	6th
Tokyo Verdy Beleza	Kita, Tokyo	Ajinomoto Field Nishigaoka	7,258	3rd
Urawa Red Diamonds	Saitama, Saitama	Urawa Komaba Stadium	21,500	2nd

=== Personnel and kits ===
Team	Manager	Kit manufacturer	Shirt sponsor
AC Nagano Parceiro	(Japan) Kumiko Tashiro	Penalty	Hokto
Albirex Niigata	(Japan) Daisuke Muramatsu	X-girl	Kameda Seika
AS Elfen Saitama	(Japan) Tomoe Tanabe	X-girl	Chifure Holdings Co., Ltd.
INAC Kobe Leonessa	(South Korea) Park Kang-jo	Hummel International	Mondahmin (home kit); Earth Corporation (away kit)
JEF United Chiba	(Japan) Shinji Sarusawa	X-girl	Yakult Honsha
MyNavi Sendai	(Japan) Takeo Matsuda	X-girl	Mynavi Corporation
Nojima Stella Sagamihara	(Japan) Masaaki Kanno	X-girl	Television Kanagawa
Omiya Ardija Ventus	(Japan) Takeyuki Okamoto	X-girl	ahamo
Sanfrecce Hiroshima Regina	(Japan) Shin Nakamura	Nike	EDION
Tokyo Verdy Beleza	(Japan) Kazuhiko Takemoto	Athleta	Coca-Cola Bottlers Japan Inc.
Urawa Red Diamonds	(Japan) Naoki Kusunose	Nike	POLUS Co., Ltd.

== Foreign players ==
The JFA subsidizes salaries for players from Southeast Asian member federations, while the league itself subsidizes players from top-ranked FIFA countries.

Club	Player 1	Player 2	Player 3
MyNavi Sendai	(Thailand) Phornphirun Philawan	(Montenegro) Slađana Bulatović	
Urawa Red Diamonds			
Omiya Ardija Ventus			
AS Elfen Saitama			
JEF United Chiba	(Chinese Taipei) Cheng Ssu-yu		
Tokyo Verdy Beleza			
Nojima Stella Kanagawa			
AC Nagano Parceiro			
Albirex Niigata			
INAC Kobe Leonessa			
Sanfrecce Hiroshima Regina			

== League table ==
Pos	Team	Pld	W	D	L	GF	GA	GD	Pts
1	Urawa Red Diamonds (C)	20	17	1	2	50	17	+33	52
2	INAC Kobe Leonessa	20	13	5	2	35	15	+20	44
3	Tokyo Verdy Beleza	20	12	6	2	47	22	+25	42
4	Mynavi Sendai	20	7	6	7	20	25	−5	27
5	Sanfrecce Hiroshima Regina	20	6	6	8	21	27	−6	24
6	Omiya Ardija Ventus	20	6	5	9	22	27	−5	23
7	AC Nagano Parceiro	20	5	6	9	21	25	−4	21
8	JEF United Chiba	20	4	8	8	21	27	−6	20
9	Nojima Stella Sagamihara	20	5	4	11	17	32	−15	19
10	Albirex Niigata	20	4	4	12	18	29	−11	16
11	AS Elfen Saitama	20	5	1	14	15	41	−26	16

Source: WE League
Rules for classification: 1) Points; 2) Goal difference; 3) Number of goals scored.
(C) Champions

== Results ==
Home \ Away	PAR	ALB	ELF	LEO	JEF	MYN	STE	VEN	REG	BEL	RED
AC Nagano Parceiro	—	0–2	2–1	2–2	0–0	1–2	1–0	0–0	3–3	0–2	2–1
Albirex Niigata	1–0	—	0–3	1–0	2–2	0–1	2–3	0–1	1–0	2–3	1–2
AS Elfen Saitama	0–3	1–0	—	0–2	3–1	0–1	1–2	1–2	1–0	0–3	0–5
INAC Kobe Leonessa	1–0	2–1	3–0	—	4–2	3–0	2–0	2–0	1–1	2–2	1–2
JEF United Chiba	1–0	1–1	2–2	0–1	—	1–1	4–0	1–0	0–0	1–2	0–2
MyNavi Sendai	1–0	0–0	3–1	1–2	0–0	—	1–1	0–4	3–2	1–2	1–2
Nojima Stella Sagamihara	2–0	1–1	0–1	0–2	2–0	1–2	—	1–1	0–2	1–3	1–3
Omiya Ardija Ventus	0–2	3–2	1–0	0–1	2–4	1–1	0–0	—	5–0	0–2	0–3
Sanfrecce Hiroshima Regina	0–0	2–1	1–0	1–1	2–1	2–1	1–2	0–0	—	1–3	1–2
Tokyo Verdy Beleza	3–3	1–0	9–0	1–1	0–0	0–0	3–0	3–2	0–1	—	3–5
Urawa Red Diamonds	3–2	3–0	1–0	1–2	3–0	2–0	2–0	4–0	2–1	2–2	—

Source: WE League
Legend: Blue = home team win; Yellow = draw; Red = away team win.

== Season statistics ==
=== Top scorers ===
Rank	Player	Club	Goals
1	(Japan) Riko Ueki	Nippon TV Tokyo Verdy Beleza	14
2	(Japan) Kiko Seike	Urawa Red Diamonds	12
3	(Japan) Yuika Sugasawa	Urawa Red Diamonds	11
3	(Japan) Aoba Fujino	Nippon TV Tokyo Verdy Beleza	11
3	(Japan) Mina Tanaka	INAC Kobe Leonessa	11
6	(Japan) Mei Shimada	Urawa Red Diamonds	8
6	(Japan) Ayaka Inoue	Omiya Ardija Ventus	8
8	(Japan) Hikaru Naomoto	Urawa Red Diamonds	7
8	(Japan) Yoshino Nakashima	Sanfrecce Hiroshima Regina	7
10	(Japan) Rikako Kobayashi	Nippon TV Tokyo Verdy Beleza	6
10	(Japan) Ayaka Michigami	Albirex Niigata	6
10	(Japan) Megumi Takase	INAC Kobe Leonessa	6

== Matches ==
List of matches that were played, or are yet to be played on the 2022–23 WE League season. With an even number of teams (11) competing in the league, there are five matches to play each matchweek, with the team who doesn't have any fixture on the matchweek earning a "standby round", called as the "WE League WE Action Day". All the matches and fixtures displayed here can be found at the Official WE League Website. All the kick-off times are listed in (UTC+9), Japan Standard Time (JST).

=== Matchweek 1 ===
22 October 2022	MyNavi Sendai	3–1	AS Elfen Saitama	Sendai
13:05	Funaki 34'; Yakata 43'; Nakajima 67'	Report	Kishi 27'	Stadium: Yurtec Stadium Sendai; Attendance: 3,117; Referee: Asaka Koizumi

22 October 2022	Tokyo Verdy Beleza	1–0	Albirex Niigata	Kita
14:00	Fujino 67'	Report		Stadium: Ajinomoto Field Nishigaoka; Attendance: 1,364; Referee: Kumiko Matsuo

23 October 2022	INAC Kobe Leonessa	2–0	Omiya Ardija Ventus	Kobe
13:03	Tanaka 35', 80'	Report		Stadium: Noevir Stadium Kobe; Attendance: 3,336; Referee: Haruna Kanematsu

23 October 2022	Urawa Red Diamonds	3–2	AC Nagano Parceiro	Saitama
14:03	Shiokoshi 5'; Seike 11'; Shimada 84'	Report	Kawafune 16'; Inamura 87'	Stadium: Saitama Stadium 2002; Attendance: 4,604; Referee: Minako Asakura

23 October 2022	Sanfrecce Hiroshima Regina	2–1	JEF United Chiba	Hiroshima
14:03	Nakashima 46'; Takizawa 50'	Report	Otaki 37'	Stadium: Hiroshima Koiki Park Football Stadium No.1; Attendance: 1,274; Referee: Emi Chiba

=== Matchweek 2 ===
29 October 2022	AS Elfen Saitama	1–0	Albirex Niigata	Kumagaya
14:00	Yoshida 38'	Report		Stadium: Kumagaya Athletic Stadium; Attendance: 1,741; Referee: Mariko Iwaki

29 October 2022	AC Nagano Parceiro	1–2	MyNavi Sendai	Nagano
14:00	Kikuchi 54'	Report	Yakata 10'; Bulatović 39'	Stadium: Nagano U Stadium; Attendance: 1,182; Referee: Mari Yamamoto

30 October 2022	INAC Kobe Leonessa	4–2	JEF United Chiba	Kobe
13:00	Takase 59', 69'; Tanaka 61'; Narumiya 85'	Report	Kamogawa 64'	Stadium: Noevir Stadium Kobe; Attendance: 1,508; Referee: Fusako Kajiyama

30 October 2022	Tokyo Verdy Beleza	3–5	Urawa Red Diamonds	Kita
14:00	Iwasaki 7'; Kinoshita 42'; Fujino 79'	Report	Sugasawa 24', 53', 83'; Naomoto 37'; Shiokoshi 69'	Stadium: Ajinomoto Field Nishigaoka; Attendance: 2,210; Referee: Emi Chiba

30 October 2022	Sanfrecce Hiroshima Regina	1–2	Nojima Stella Sagamihara	Hiroshima
14:00	Sayama 38'	Report	Sugita 32'; Oga 73'	Stadium: Hiroshima Koiki Park Football Stadium No.1; Attendance: 1,288; Referee: Michiko Fujita

=== Matchweek 3 ===
5 November 2022	JEF United Chiba	1–0	AC Nagano Parceiro	Chiba
13:00	Kamogawa 36'	Report		Stadium: Fukuda Denshi Arena; Attendance: 2,082; Referee: Haruna Kanematsu

5 November 2022	Omiya Ardija Ventus	1–0	AS Elfen Saitama	Saitama
14:00	Okuma 31'	Report		Stadium: NACK5 Stadium Omiya; Attendance: 1,733; Referee: Yoshimi Yamashita

5 November 2022	Albirex Niigata	0–1	MyNavi Sendai	Niigata
14:00		Report	Ichise 89'	Stadium: Denka Big Swan Stadium; Attendance: 1,234; Referee: Kazue Kusadokoro

5 November 2022	Nojima Stella Sagamihara	1–3	Tokyo Verdy Beleza	Hiratsuka
15:00	Sugita 1'	Report	Hijikata 44'; Kitamura 60'; Ueki 66'	Stadium: Lemon Gas Stadium Hiratsuka; Attendance: 732; Referee: Satomi Arakawa

6 November 2022	Urawa Red Diamonds	2–1	Sanfrecce Hiroshima Regina	Saitama
15:00	Seike 70'; Shimada 86'	Report	Taniguchi 84'	Stadium: Urawa Komaba Stadium; Attendance: 1,999; Referee: Fusako Kajiyama

=== Matchweek 4 ===
26 November 2022	MyNavi Sendai	0–4	Omiya Ardija Ventus	Sendai
13:00		Report	Takahashi 13', 63'; Inoue 17'; Goshima 44'	Stadium: Yurtec Stadium Sendai; Attendance: 1,686; Referee: Kumiko Matsuo

26 November 2022	Albirex Niigata	2–3	Nojima Stella Sagamihara	Niigata
13:00	Yamaya 34'; Shirai 45'	Report	Sugita 1'; Matsumoto 6'; Minamino 72'	Stadium: Denka Big Swan Stadium; Attendance: 826; Referee: Chihiro Ikki

26 November 2022	AS Elfen Saitama	3–1	JEF United Chiba	Kumagaya
14:00	Yumura 28', 85'; Yoshida 90+2'	Report	Ichinose 22'	Stadium: Kumagaya Athletic Stadium; Attendance: 1,011; Referee: Emi Chiba

26 November 2022	AC Nagano Parceiro	0–2	Tokyo Verdy Beleza	Nagano
14:00		Report	Fujino 52'; Ueki 60'	Stadium: Nagano U Stadium; Attendance: 1,372; Referee: Mariko Iwaki

26 November 2022	Sanfrecce Hiroshima Regina	1–1	INAC Kobe Leonessa	Hiroshima
14:00	Ueno 64'	Report	Tanaka 89'	Stadium: Hiroshima Koiki Park Football Stadium No.1; Attendance: 1,117; Referee: Asaka Koizumi

=== Matchweek 5 ===
3 December 2022	JEF United Chiba	1–1	Albirex Niigata	Ichihara
13:00		Report	Takikawa 71'	Stadium: ZA Oripri Stadium; Attendance: 517; Referee: Satomi Arakawa

3 December 2022	Omiya Ardija Ventus	0–3	Urawa Red Diamonds	Saitama
14:00		Report	Endo 9'; Sugasawa 40', 43'	Stadium: NACK5 Stadium Omiya; Attendance: 3,190; Referee: Asaka Koizumi

3 December 2022	Nojima Stella Sagamihara	1–2	MyNavi Sendai	Sagamihara
14:00	Sasai 47'	Report	Funaki 60', 78'	Stadium: Sagamihara Gion Stadium; Attendance: 1,183; Referee: Mari Yamamoto

4 December 2022	INAC Kobe Leonessa	3–0	AS Elfen Saitama	Kobe
13:00	Narumiya 8'; Takase 62'; Hamano 89'	Report		Stadium: Noevir Stadium Kobe; Attendance: 2,209; Referee: Kazue Kusadokoro

4 December 2022	Tokyo Verdy Beleza	0–1	Sanfrecce Hiroshima Regina	Kita
14:00		Report	Nakashima 63'	Stadium: Ajinomoto Field Nishigaoka; Attendance: 1,586; Referee: Kumiko Matsuo

=== Matchweek 6 ===
10 December 2022	MyNavi Sendai	0–0	JEF United Chiba	Sendai
13:00		Report		Stadium: Yurtec Stadium Sendai; Attendance: 1,651; Referee: Minako Asakura

10 December 2022	Albirex Niigata	0–1	Omiya Ardija Ventus	Niigata
13:00		Report	Inoue 33'	Stadium: Niigata Athletic Stadium; Attendance: 527; Referee: Emi Chiba

10 December 2022	AS Elfen Saitama	1–0	Sanfrecce Hiroshima Regina	Kumagaya
14:00	Yumura 8'	Report		Stadium: Kumagaya Athletic Stadium; Attendance: 1,029; Referee: Mariko Iwaki

10 December 2022	AC Nagano Parceiro	1–0	Nojima Stella Sagamihara	Nagano
14:00	Ito 43'	Report		Stadium: Nagano U Stadium; Attendance: 1,013; Referee: Ayano Yanagi

11 December 2022	Urawa Red Diamonds	1–2	INAC Kobe Leonessa	Saitama
14:03	Seike 64'	Report	Moriya 18'; Takase 88'	Stadium: Urawa Komaba Stadium; Attendance: 2,093; Referee: Fusako Kajiyama

=== Matchweek 7 ===
24 December 2022	Omiya Ardija Ventus	0–2	Tokyo Verdy Beleza	Saitama
14:00		Report	Ueki 50'; Muramatsu 53'	Stadium: NACK5 Stadium Omiya; Attendance: 1,492; Referee: Fusako Kajiyama

21 March 2023	Sanfrecce Hiroshima Regina	2–1	Albirex Niigata	Hiroshima
14:00	Taniguchi 90+2'	Report	Kamionobe 6'	Stadium: Hiroshima Koiki Park Football Stadium No.1; Attendance: 698; Referee: Kumi Hiruma
Note: The match was due to be played on 24 December 2022; Ended up postponed due to heavy snowfall.

25 December 2022	INAC Kobe Leonessa	1–0	AC Nagano Parceiro	Kobe
13:00	Nagae 87' (o.g.)	Report		Stadium: Noevir Stadium Kobe; Attendance: 2,450; Referee: Asaka Koizumi

25 December 2022	Urawa Red Diamonds	2–0	MyNavi Sendai	Saitama
14:00	Ando 5'; Endo 40'	Report		Stadium: Urawa Komaba Stadium; Attendance: 1,635; Referee: Kumiko Matsuo

25 December 2022	AS Elfen Saitama	1–2	Nojima Stella Sagamihara	Kumagaya
14:00	Seno 39'	Report	Hirano 44'; Minamino 89'	Stadium: Kumagaya Athletic Stadium; Attendance: 1,206; Referee: Chihiro Ikki

=== Matchweek 8 ===
7 January 2023	Sanfrecce Hiroshima Regina	0–0	AC Nagano Parceiro	Hiroshima
14:03		Report		Stadium: Hiroshima Koiki Park Football Stadium No.1; Attendance: 1,040; Referee: Ayano Yanagi

7 January 2023	Nojima Stella Sagamihara	1–1	Omiya Ardija Ventus	Sagamihara
14:04	Sasai 58'	Report	Okuma 28'	Stadium: Sagamihara Gion Stadium; Attendance: 1,451; Referee: Satomi Arakawa

8 January 2023	INAC Kobe Leonessa	2–1	Albirex Niigata	Kobe
10:33	Aikawa 12'; Moriya 90+3'	Report	Takikawa 55'	Stadium: Noevir Stadium Kobe; Attendance: 2,462; Referee: Haruna Kanematsu

8 January 2023	JEF United Chiba	0–2	Urawa Red Diamonds	Ichihara
13:03		Report	Shimada 47'; Ando 51'	Stadium: ZA Oripri Stadium; Attendance: 1,200; Referee: Kazue Kusadokoro

9 January 2023	Tokyo Verdy Beleza	0–0	MyNavi Sendai	Kita
14:03		Report		Stadium: Ajinomoto Field Nishigaoka; Attendance: 1,311; Referee: Chihiro Ikki

=== Matchweek 9 ===
5 March 2023	Albirex Niigata	1–2	Urawa Red Diamonds	Niigata
13:00	Takikawa 70'	Report	Shimada 56'; Ishikawa 81'	Stadium: Denka Big Swan Stadium; Attendance: 871; Referee: Satomi Arakawa

5 March 2023	MyNavi Sendai	1–2	INAC Kobe Leonessa	Sendai
14:00	Funaki 53'	Report	Tsutsui 3'; Takase 89'	Stadium: Yurtec Stadium Sendai; Attendance: 2,509; Referee: Saori Takahashi

5 March 2023	AS Elfen Saitama	0–3	Tokyo Verdy Beleza	Kumagaya
14:00		Report	Kitamura 29'; ? 45+1' (o.g.); Fujino 65'	Stadium: Kumagaya Athletic Stadium; Attendance: 1,076; Referee: Fusako Kajiyama

5 March 2023	Nojima Stella Sagamihara	2–0	JEF United Chiba	Sagamihara
14:00	Hamada 8'; Sasai 71'	Report		Stadium: Sagamihara Gion Stadium; Attendance: 605; Referee: Ayano Yanagi

5 March 2023	AC Nagano Parceiro	0–0	Omiya Ardija Ventus	Nagano
14:00		Report		Stadium: Minami Nagano Sports Park Stadium; Attendance: 882; Referee: Chihiro Ikki

=== Matchweek 10 ===
12 March 2023	JEF United Chiba	1–2	Tokyo Verdy Beleza	Chiba
13:03	Osawa 25'	Report	Ueki 63'; Hijikata 79'	Stadium: Fukuda Denshi Arena; Attendance: 807; Referee: Kazue Kusadokoro

12 March 2023	INAC Kobe Leonessa	2–0	Nojima Stella Sagamihara	Kobe
13:03	Tsutsui 14'; Itō 41'	Report		Stadium: Noevir Stadium Kobe; Attendance: 1,601; Referee: Chihiro Ikki

12 March 2023	Urawa Red Diamonds	1–0	AS Elfen Saitama	Saitama
14:03	Seike 89'	Report		Stadium: Urawa Komaba Stadium; Attendance: 1,832; Referee: Saori Takahashi

12 March 2023	Omiya Ardija Ventus	5–0	Sanfrecce Hiroshima Regina	Saitama
14:03	Uetsuji 4'; Inoue 13', 69'; Takahashi 56', 76'	Report		Stadium: NACK5 Stadium Omiya; Attendance: 2,726; Referee: Miu Sone

12 March 2023	AC Nagano Parceiro	0–2	Albirex Niigata	Nagano
14:03		Report	Michigami 57', 60'	Stadium: Nagano U Stadium; Attendance: 925; Referee: Minako Asakura

=== Matchweek 11 ===
18 March 2023	JEF United Chiba	1–0	Omiya Ardija Ventus	Chiba
13:03	Tsurumi 15'	Report		Stadium: Fukuda Denshi Arena; Attendance: 599; Referee: Fusako Kajiyama (Japan)

18 March 2023	Sanfrecce Hiroshima Regina	2–1	MyNavi Sendai	Hiroshima
14:03	Kinga 25'; Ueno 58'	Report	Nakajima 3'	Stadium: Hiroshima Koiki Park Football Stadium No.1; Attendance: 814; Referee: Kirsty Dowle (England)

18 March 2023	AS Elfen Saitama	0–3	AC Nagano Parceiro	Kumagaya
14:04		Report	Sakakibara 9'; Okubo 45+1'; Ozawa 78'	Stadium: Kumagaya Athletic Stadium; Attendance: 434; Referee: Emi Chiba (Japan)

19 March 2023	Tokyo Verdy Beleza	1–1	INAC Kobe Leonessa	Kita
14:03	Muramatsu 82'	Report	Koyama 67'	Stadium: Ajinomoto Field Nishigaoka; Attendance: 1,777; Referee: Asaka Koizumi (Japan)

19 March 2023	Nojima Stella Sagamihara	1–3	Urawa Red Diamonds	Sagamihara
14:04	Matsumoto 38'	Report	Ando 9'; Mizutani 25'; Naomoto 79'	Stadium: Sagamihara Gion Stadium; Attendance: 874; Referee: Haruna Kanematsu (Japan)

=== Matchweek 12 ===
25 March 2023	Albirex Niigata	0–3	AS Elfen Saitama	Chiba
13:03		Report	Nishikawa 20', 22'; Setoguchi 63'	Stadium: Fukuda Denshi Arena; Attendance: 523; Referee: Asaka Koizumi (Japan)

25 March 2023	AC Nagano Parceiro	0–0	JEF United Chiba	Hiroshima
14:03		Report		Stadium: Hiroshima Koiki Park Football Stadium No.1; Attendance: 635; Referee: Haruna Kanematsu (Japan)

26 March 2023	INAC Kobe Leonessa	1–1	Sanfrecce Hiroshima Regina	Kumagaya
13:03	Tanaka 30'	Report	Masuya 72'	Stadium: Kumagaya Athletic Stadium; Attendance: 1,432; Referee: Ayano Yanagi (Japan)

26 March 2023	MyNavi Sendai	1–2	Tokyo Verdy Beleza	Sendai
13:04	Matsukubo 53'	Report	Kinoshita 25'; Ueki 31'	Stadium: Yurtec Stadium Sendai; Attendance: 823; Referee: Emi Chiba (Japan)

26 March 2023	Omiya Ardija Ventus	0–0	Nojima Stella Sagamihara	Saitama
14:03		Report		Stadium: NACK5 Stadium Omiya; Attendance: 701; Referee: Kirsty Dowle (England)

=== Matchweek 13 ===
1 April 2023	JEF United Chiba	0–0	Sanfrecce Hiroshima Regina	Chiba
13:00		Report		Stadium: Fukuda Denshi Arena; Attendance: 596; Referee: Satomi Arakawa (Japan)

1 April 2023	AS Elfen Saitama	0–1	MyNavi Sendai	Kumagaya
14:00		Report	Manaka Matsukubo 6'	Stadium: Kumagaya Athletic Stadium; Attendance: 854; Referee: Azusa Sugino (Japan)

1 April 2023	Nojima Stella Sagamihara	2–0	AC Nagano Parceiro	Sagamihara
14:00	Ōga 84'; Hamada 86'	Report		Stadium: Sagamihara Gion Stadium; Attendance: 825; Referee: Fusako Kajiyama (Japan)

2 April 2023	Urawa Red Diamonds	3–0	Albirex Niigata	Saitama
14:00	Seike 41'; Ando 47'; Sugasawa 58'	Report		Stadium: Urawa Komaba Stadium; Attendance: 1,718; Referee: Kirsty Dowle (England)

2 April 2023	Tokyo Verdy Beleza	3–2	Omiya Ardija Ventus	Kita
14:00	Fujino 21'; Ueki 36'; Nishikawa 45+1'	Report	Oshima 78'; Inoue 87'	Stadium: Ajinomoto Field Nishigaoka; Attendance: 1,095; Referee: Haruna Kanematsu (Japan)

=== Matchweek 14 ===
22 April 2023	Albirex Niigata	2–2	JEF United Chiba	Niigata
13:03	Michigami 63', 79'	Report	Kamogawa 4'; Imai 24'	Stadium: Niigata Athletic Stadium; Attendance: 981; Referee: Kazue Kusadokoro

22 April 2023	MyNavi Sendai	1–2	Urawa Red Diamonds	Kita
13:04	Yakata 45'	Report	Seike 22'; Naomoto 39'	Stadium: Ajinomoto Field Nishigaoka; Attendance: 1,757; Referee: Emi Chiba

22 April 2023	Nojima Stella Sagamihara	0–1	AS Elfen Saitama	Yokohama
14:03		Report	Setoguchi 21'	Stadium: NHK Spring Mitsuzawa Football Stadium; Attendance: 718; Referee: Chihhiro Ikki

23 April 2023	Omiya Ardija Ventus	0–1	INAC Kobe Leonessa	Saitama
14:03		Report	Takase 43'	Stadium: NACK5 Stadium Omiya; Attendance: 1,095; Referee: Saori Takahashi

23 April 2023	Sanfrecce Hiroshima Regina	1–3	Tokyo Verdy Beleza	Hiroshima
14:03	Nakashima 61'	Report	Ueki 53'; Fujino 65', 80'	Stadium: Hiroshima Koiki Park Football Stadium No.1; Attendance: 1,065; Referee: Minako Asakura

=== Matchweek 15 ===
29 April 2023	JEF United Chiba	2–2	AS Elfen Saitama	Ichihara
12:03	Osawa 67'; Hasuwa 90+2'	Report	Yoshida 64'; Kishi 71'	Stadium: ZA Oripri Stadium; Attendance: 450; Referee: Ayano Yanagi

29 April 2023	Urawa Red Diamonds	2–0	Nojima Stella Sagamihara	Saitama
14:03	Naomoto 5'; Sugasawa 30'	Report		Stadium: Urawa Komaba Stadium; Attendance: 1,705; Referee: Saori Takahashi

29 April 2023	Omiya Ardija Ventus	3–2	Albirex Niigata	Saitama
14:03	Inoue 46', 67'; Okuma 87'	Report	Michigami 33'; Shirai 73'	Stadium: NACK5 Stadium Omiya; Attendance: 2,224; Referee: Mari Yamamoto

29 April 2023	AC Nagano Parceiro	3–3	Sanfrecce Hiroshima Regina	Nagano
15:03	Takizawa 37', 45'; Ito 43'	Report	Shimabukuro 13'; Nakashima 50', 56'	Stadium: Nagano U Stadium; Attendance: 924; Referee: Satomi Arakawa

29 April 2023	INAC Kobe Leonessa	3–0	MyNavi Sendai	Kobe
19:03	Tanaka 10', 88'; Ito 37'	Report		Stadium: Noevir Stadium Kobe; Attendance: 3,012; Referee: Fusako Kajiyama

=== Matchweek 16 ===
3 May 2023	Tokyo Verdy Beleza	0–0	JEF United Chiba	Kita
13:03		Report		Stadium: Ajinomoto Field Nishigaoka; Attendance: 1,259; Referee: Miu Sone (Japan)

3 May 2023	Albirex Niigata	1–0	INAC Kobe Leonessa	Niigata
13:03	Michigami 41'	Report		Stadium: Niigata Athletic Stadium; Attendance: 727; Referee: Minako Asakura (Japan)

3 May 2023	AS Elfen Saitama	1–2	Omiya Ardija Ventus	Kumagaya
14:03	Yoshida 31'	Report	Kitagawa 22'; Inoue 49'	Stadium: Kumagaya Athletic Stadium; Attendance: 1,320; Referee: Michiko Fujita (Japan)

3 May 2023	Sanfrecce Hiroshima Regina	1–2	Urawa Red Diamonds	Hiroshima
14:03	Nakashima 32'	Report	Sugasawa 64'; Shimada 71'	Stadium: Hiroshima Koiki Park Football Stadium No.1; Attendance: 1,811; Referee: Asaka Koizumi (Japan)

3 May 2023	MyNavi Sendai	1–0	AC Nagano Parceiro	Sendai
19:03	Hirosawa 84'	Report		Stadium: Yurtec Stadium Sendai; Attendance: 1,721; Referee: Kazue Kusadokoro (Japan)

=== Matchweek 17 ===
7 May 2023	Albirex Niigata	1–0	Sanfrecce Hiroshima Regina	Shibata
10:33	Ishibuchi 11'	Report		Stadium: Ijimino Park Athletics Stadium; Attendance: 284; Referee: Haruna Kanematsu (Japan)

7 May 2023	JEF United Chiba	1–1	MyNavi Sendai	Ichihara
13:03	Nakajima 52'	Report	Kamogawa 56'	Stadium: ZA Oripri Stadium; Attendance: 294; Referee: Emi Chiba (Japan)

7 May 2023	Urawa Red Diamonds	2–2	Tokyo Verdy Beleza	Saitama
14:03	Seike 61'; Shiokoshi 68'	Report (JP); Report (EN)	Ueki 29'; Kitamura 82'	Stadium: Urawa Komaba Stadium; Attendance: 1,430; Referee: Azusa Sugino (Japan)

7 May 2023	Nojima Stella Kanagawa Sagamihara	0–2	INAC Kobe Leonessa	Sagamihara
14:03		Report	Tanaka 42', 46'	Stadium: Sagamihara Gion Stadium; Attendance: 634; Referee: Asaka Koizumi (Japan)

7 May 2023	AC Nagano Parceiro	2–1	Chifure AS Elfen Saitama	Nagano
15:03	Okutsu 63', 67'	Report	Yoshida 4'	Stadium: Nagano U Stadium; Attendance: 538; Referee: Chihiro Ikki (Japan)

=== Matchweek 18 ===
13 May 2023	JEF United Ichihara Chiba	4–0	Nojima Stella Kanagawa Sagamihara	Chiba
13:00	Fujio 16'; Chiba 24', 47'; Osawa 85'	Report		Stadium: Fukuda Denshi Arena; Attendance: 497; Referee: Haruna Kanematsu (Japan)

13 May 2023	Omiya Ardija Ventus	0–2	AC Nagano Parceiro	Saitama
14:00		Report	Takizawa 46'; Nagae 84'	Stadium: NACK5 Stadium Omiya; Attendance: 634; Referee: Azusa Sugino (Japan)

14 May 2023	MyNavi Sendai	0–0	Albirex Niigata	Sendai
13:03		Report		Stadium: Yurtec Stadium Sendai; Attendance: 1,514; Referee: Asaka Koizumi (Japan)

14 May 2023	INAC Kobe Leonessa	1–2	Urawa Red Diamonds	Kobe
13:03	Tanaka 56'	Report	Shimada 32'; Sugasawa 76'	Stadium: Noevir Stadium Kobe; Attendance: 1,918; Referee: Yoshimi Yamashita (Japan)

14 May 2023	Nippon TV Tokyo Verdy Beleza	9–0	Chifure AS Elfen Saitama	Kita
14:03	Ueki 9', 36', 43', 60', 68'; Kobayashi 25', 46'; Kitamura 45+3'; Miyagawa 66'	Report		Stadium: Ajinomoto Field Nishigaoka; Attendance: 819; Referee: Fusako Kajiyama (Japan)

=== Matchweek 19 ===
15 April 2023	Sanfrecce Hiroshima Regina	0–0	Omiya Ardija Ventus	Hiroshima
14:00		Report		Stadium: Hiroshima Koiki Park Football Stadium No.1; Attendance: 636; Referee: Azusa Sugino

20 May 2023	Tokyo Verdy Beleza	3–0	Nojima Stella Kanagawa Sagamihara	Kita
14:03	Ueki 25'; Kobayashi 54'; Fujino 89'	Report		Stadium: Ajinomoto Field Nishigaoka; Attendance: 1,091; Referee: Emi Chiba

21 May 2023	Albirex Niigata	1–0	AC Nagano Parceiro	Niigata
13:03	Miura 7'	Report		Stadium: Denka Big Swan Stadium; Attendance: 1,009; Referee: Saori Takahashi

21 May 2023	Urawa Red Diamonds	3–0	JEF United Chiba	Saitama
14:03	Seike 10', 62'; Naomoto 74'	Report		Stadium: Urawa Komaba Stadium; Attendance: 1,875; Referee: Asaka Koizumi

21 May 2023	Chifure AS Elfen Saitama	0–2	INAC Kobe Leonessa	Kumagaya
14:03		Report	Koyama 10'; Narumiya 79'	Stadium: Kumagaya Athletic Stadium; Attendance: 940; Referee: Azusa Sugino

=== Matchweek 20 ===
27 May 2023	MyNavi Sendai	3–2	Sanfrecce Hiroshima Regina	Sendai
13:00	Yakata 11'; Matsukubo 30'; Own goal 60' (o.g.)	Report	Tachibana 49'; Takizawa 52'	Stadium: Yurtec Stadium Sendai; Attendance: 1,211; Referee: Satomi Arakawa (Japan)

27 May 2023	Omiya Ardija Ventus	2–4	JEF United Chiba	Saitama
14:00	Nakada 20', 22'	Report	Osawa 9'; Kamogawa 14'; Chiba 70'; Own goal 87' (o.g.)	Stadium: NACK5 Stadium Omiya; Attendance: 913; Referee: Emi Chiba (Japan)

27 May 2023	Nojima Stella Kanagawa Sagamihara	1–1	Albirex Niigata	Sagamihara
14:00	Oga 90'	Report	Takikawa 65'	Stadium: Sagamihara Gion Stadium; Attendance: 959; Referee: Fusako Kajiyama (Japan)

27 May 2023	AC Nagano Parceiro	2–1	Urawa Red Diamonds	Nagano
14:00	Okubo 68'; Suzuki 90'	Report	Shimada 11'	Stadium: Nagano U Stadium; Attendance: 1,554; Referee: Ayano Yanagi (Japan)

28 May 2023	INAC Kobe Leonessa	2–2	Nippon TV Tokyo Verdy Beleza	Kobe
13:00	Tanaka 9'; Aikawa 15'	Report	Kobayashi 31'; Ueki 45'	Stadium: Noevir Stadium Kobe; Attendance: 2,012; Referee: Haruna Kanematsu (Japan)

=== Matchweek 21 ===
3 June 2023	MyNavi Sendai	1–1	Nojima Stella Kanagawa Sagamihara	Sendai
13:03	Miyazawa 4'	Report	Miyazawa 4'	Stadium: Yurtec Stadium Sendai; Attendance: 1,985; Referee: Haruna Kanematsu

3 June 2023	Urawa Red Diamonds	4–0	Omiya Ardija Ventus	Saitama
14:03	Naomoto 24'; Shimada 45'; Seike 60', 77'	Report		Stadium: Urawa Komaba Stadium; Attendance: 4,905; Referee: Asaka Koizumi

3 June 2023	Nippon TV Tokyo Verdy Beleza	3–3	AC Nagano Parceiro	Kita
14:03	Fujino 14', 44'; Kobayashi 76'	Report	Takizawa 19'; Ueda 69'; Suzuki 89'	Stadium: Ajinomoto Field Nishigaoka; Attendance: 1,261; Referee: Satomi Arakawa

3 June 2023	Sanfrecce Hiroshima Regina	1–0	Chifure AS Elfen Saitama	Hiroshima
14:03	75' (o.g.)	Report		Stadium: Hiroshima Koiki Park Football Stadium No.1; Attendance: 1,148; Referee: Ayano Yanagi

4 June 2023	JEF United Chiba	0–1	INAC Kobe Leonessa	Chiba
13:03		Report	Narumiya 43'	Stadium: Fukuda Denshi Arena; Attendance: 2,051; Referee: Chihiro Ikki

=== Matchweek 22 ===
10 June 2023	Omiya Ardija Ventus	1–1	MyNavi Sendai	Saitama
14:03	Oshima 70'	Report	Matsukubo 58'	Stadium: NACK5 Stadium Omiya; Attendance: 1,694; Referee: Fusako Kajiyama

10 June 2023	Nojima Stella Kanagawa Sagamihara	0–2	Sanfrecce Hiroshima Regina	Sagamihara
14:03		Report	Nakashima 10'; Takizawa 62'	Stadium: Sagamihara Gion Stadium; Attendance: 1,251; Referee: Yoshimi Yamashita

10 June 2023	AC Nagano Parceiro	2–2	INAC Kobe Leonessa	Nagano
14:03	Kikuchi 28'; Sakakibara 67'	Report	Moriya 44'; Sakaguchi 77'	Stadium: Nagano U Stadium; Attendance: 1,807; Referee: Ayano Yanagi

10 June 2023	Albirex Niigata	2–3	Nippon TV Tokyo Verdy Beleza	Niigata
14:03	Ishibuchi 2'; Kamionobe 41'	Report	Yamamoto 60'; Sakabe 61'; Kobayashi 79'	Stadium: Niigata Athletic Stadium; Attendance: 1,113; Referee: Emi Chiba

10 June 2023	Chifure AS Elfen Saitama	0–5	Urawa Red Diamonds	Kumagaya
14:04		Report	Ando 5'; Sugasawa 21', 57'; Naomoto 54'; Seike 90+3'	Stadium: Kumagaya Athletic Stadium; Attendance: 2,502; Referee: Haruna Kanematsu

== Broadcasting rights ==
- In Japan, there is live streaming on DAZN. Globally, some matches are streamed in the WE League's own YouTube channel.

== See also ==
- Japan Football Association (JFA)
  - 2023 in Japanese football
    - 2023 Nadeshiko League
    - 2023 Empress's Cup
    - 2022–23 WE League Cup
