= 2022–23 WE League Cup =

Tournament details
- Country: Japan
- Dates: 20 August – 1 October 2022
- Teams: 11

Final positions
- Champions: Urawa Red Diamonds Ladies (1st title)
- Runners-up: Nippon TV Tokyo Verdy Beleza

Tournament statistics
- Matches played: 26
- Goals scored: 54 (2.08 per match)
- Top goal scorer: Riko Ueki (6 goals)

The 2022–23 WE League Cup is the 1st season of the WE League Cup, a women's football cup tournament that will be contested annually between WE League clubs. As the league have as of the 2022–23 season only 11 clubs featuring in the tournament and the plan was to make a group stage between the knockouts, it was necessary that six teams featured in a group, and five in another. The winner of each group got a ticket to the final, which will be contested by Urawa Red Diamonds and Tokyo Verdy Beleza. Despite the tournament refers to itself as if it was played between two different years, the tournament starts and ends on 2022, as the "–23" refers to the Japan professional women's football season on the WE League, which starts in 2022 and (actually) ends on 2023. The final of this edition will be played on 1 October 2022.

== Schedule ==
	Matchday	Date
Group stage	Matchday 1	20 or 21 August
Group stage	Matchday 2	27 or 28 August
Group stage	Matchday 3	3 or 4 September
Group stage	Matchday 4	10 or 11 September
Group stage	Matchday 5	17 or 18 or 19 September
Group stage	Matchday 6	24 or 25 September
Final		1 October

== Group stage ==
=== Group A ===
Pos	Team	Pld	W	D	L	GF	GA	GD	Pts	
1	Urawa Red Diamonds Ladies	5	3	2	0	12	5	+7	11	Advance to the final
2	AC Nagano Parceiro Ladies	5	3	2	0	7	4	+3	11	
3	Chifure AS Elfen Saitama	5	1	2	2	6	8	−2	5	
4	Mynavi Sendai Ladies	5	1	2	2	5	8	−3	5	
5	Omiya Ardija Ventus	5	1	1	3	4	6	−2	4	
6	Albirex Niigata Ladies	5	1	1	3	5	8	−3	4	

Source: WE League

20 August 2022 Matchweek 1	Albirex Niigata Ladies	1–1	Chifure AS Elfen Saitama	Shibata
17:03 JST	Michigami 87'	Report (WE League)	Karahashi 86'	Stadium: Shibata Ijimino Park Athletics Stadium; Attendance: 213; Referee: Emi Chiba

20 August 2022 Matchweek 1	AC Nagano Parceiro Ladies	1–1	Mynavi Sendai Ladies	Nagano
18:00 JST	Inamura 61'	Report (WE League)	Yakata 23'	Stadium: Nagano U Stadium; Attendance: 591; Referee: Miu Sone

21 August 2022 Matchweek 1	Omiya Ardija Ventus	2–2	Urawa Red Diamonds Ladies	Saitama
18:03 JST	Nakada 30'; Uetsuji 58'	Report (WE League)	Naomoto 90+1'; Shiokoshi 90+3'	Stadium: NACK5 Stadium Omiya; Attendance: 1,857; Referee: Minako Asakura

27 August 2022 Matchweek 2	Urawa Red Diamonds Ladies	4–1	Albirex Niigata Ladies	Saitama
18:00 JST	Ando 11'; Sugasawa 20', 67'; Naomoto 82'	Report (WE League)	Yamaya 7'	Stadium: Urawa Komaba Stadium; Attendance: 1,546; Referee: Chihiro Ikki

27 August 2022 Matchweek 2	AC Nagano Parceiro Ladies	1–0	Omiya Ardija Ventus	Nagano
18:00 JST	Ito 81'	Report (WE League)		Stadium: Nagano U Stadium; Attendance: 844; Referee: Haruna Kanematsu

3 September 2022 Matchweek 3	Mynavi Sendai Ladies	0–2	Albirex Niigata Ladies	Ishinomaki
15:01 JST		Report (WE League)	Yamamoto 4'; Takikawa 69'	Stadium: Seihoku Park Ishinomaki; Attendance: 483; Referee: Satomi Arakawa

3 September 2022 Matchweek 3	Urawa Red Diamonds Ladies	2–2	AC Nagano Parceiro Ladies	Saitama
18:00 JST	Ando 7'; Takahashi 69'	Report (WE League)	Takizawa 32', 63'	Stadium: Urawa Komaba Stadium; Attendance: 1,146; Referee: Kumiko Matsuo

3 September 2022 Matchweek 3	Omiya Ardija Ventus	1–2	Chifure AS Elfen Saitama	Saitama
18:03 JST	Murakami 66'	Report (WE League)	Nishikawa 10'; Matsuyama 87'	Stadium: NACK5 Stadium Omiya; Attendance: 1,828; Referee: Fusako Kajiyama

11 September 2022 Matchweek 4	Mynavi Sendai Ladies	3–3	Chifure AS Elfen Saitama	Sendai
16:01 JST	Bulatović 44'; Yakata 56'; Sato 77'	Report (WE League)	Sakuma 49'; Yoshida 59'; Karahashi 89'	Stadium: Yurtec Stadium Sendai; Attendance: 822; Referee: Mari Yamamoto

18 September 2022 Matchweek 5	Urawa Red Diamonds Ladies	2–0	Mynavi Sendai Ladies	Saitama
15:30 JST	Seike 85'; Ando 90'	Report (WE League)		Stadium: Urawa Komaba Stadium; Attendance: 931; Referee: Haruna Kanematsu

19 September 2022 Matchweek 5	Albirex Niigata Ladies	0–1	Omiya Ardija Ventus	Shibata
16:01 JST		Report (WE League)	Inoue 10'	Stadium: Shibata Ijimino Athletic Stadium; Attendance: 1,303; Referee: Mari Yamamoto

19 September 2022 Matchweek 5	Chifure AS Elfen Saitama	0–1	AC Nagano Parceiro Ladies	Kumagaya
17:03 JST		Report (WE League)	Kawafune 84'	Stadium: Kumagaya Athletic Stadium; Attendance: 939; Referee: Junko Kirihara

24 September 2022 Matchweek 6	Mynavi Sendai Ladies	1–0	Omiya Ardija Ventus	Onagawa
13:00 JST	Ichise 90+3'	Report (WE League)		Stadium: Onagawa Stadium; Attendance: 332; Referee: Chihiro Ikki

24 September 2022 Matchweek 6	AC Nagano Parceiro Ladies	2–1	Albirex Niigata Ladies	Nagano
18:03 JST	Takizawa 2'; Okamoto 37'	Report (WE League)	Michigami 78'	Stadium: Nagano U Stadium; Attendance: 984; Referee: Fusako Kajiyama

25 September 2022 Matchweek 6	Chifure AS Elfen Saitama	0–2	Urawa Red Diamonds Ladies	Kumagaya
17:03 JST		Report (WE League)	Shimada 7'; Ishikawa 27'	Stadium: Kumagaya Athletic Stadium; Attendance: 1,755; Referee: Emi Chiba

=== Group B ===
Pos	Team	Pld	W	D	L	GF	GA	GD	Pts	
1	Nippon TV Tokyo Verdy Beleza	4	2	2	0	9	3	+6	8	Advance to the final
2	INAC Kobe Leonessa	4	2	2	0	7	5	+2	8	
3	JEF United Ichihara Chiba Ladies	4	1	2	1	5	5	0	5	
4	Nojima Stella Kanagawa Sagamihara	4	0	2	2	3	6	−3	2	
5	Sanfrecce Hiroshima Regina	4	0	2	2	5	10	−5	2	

Source: WE League

20 August 2022 Matchweek 1	INAC Kobe Leonessa	3–2	JEF United Ichihara Chiba Ladies	Sakai
19:03 JST	Sakaguchi 11', 25'; Aikawa 17'	Report (WE League)	Kamogawa 37'; Kishikawa 75'	Stadium: J-GREEN SAKAI S1 Main Field; Attendance: 936; Referee: Michiko Fujita

27 August 2022 Matchweek 2	JEF United Ichihara Chiba Ladies	0–0	Nippon TV Tokyo Verdy Beleza	Chiba
18:00 JST		Report (WE League)		Stadium: Fukuda Denshi Arena; Attendance: 461; Referee: Kazue Kusadokoro

28 August 2022 Matchweek 2	Nojima Stella Kanagawa Sagamihara	0–0	INAC Kobe Leonessa	Sagamihara
18:00 JST		Report (WE League)		Stadium: Sagamihara Gion Stadium; Attendance: 634; Referee: Saori Takahashi

4 September 2022 Matchweek 3	JEF United Ichihara Chiba Ladies	2–1	Nojima Stella Kanagawa Sagamihara	Chiba
18:00 JST	Hasuwa 8'; Osawa 50'	Report (WE League)	Fujiwara 66'	Stadium: Fukuda Denshi Arena; Attendance: 443; Referee: Minako Asakura

4 September 2022 Matchweek 3	Sanfrecce Hiroshima Regina	1–5	Nippon TV Tokyo Verdy Beleza	Hiroshima
18:03 JST	Kawashima 33'	Report (WE League)	Muramatsu 47'; Fujino 53', 90+2'; Ueki 76' (82)	Stadium: Hiroshima Koiki Park Football Stadium No.1; Attendance: 968; Referee: Ayano Yanagi

10 September 2022 Matchweek 4	Nippon TV Tokyo Verdy Beleza	2–2	INAC Kobe Leonessa	Kita
15:00 JST	Ueki 17', 20'	Report (WE League)	Moriya 62'; Tanaka 90+4'	Stadium: AGF Field; Attendance: 816; Referee: Yoshimi Yamashita

10 September 2022 Matchweek 4	Nojima Stella Kanagawa Sagamihara	2–2	Sanfrecce Hiroshima Regina	Sagamihara
15:33 JST	Fujiwara 84'; Own goal 90+4'	Report (WE League)	Tachibana 87'; Kawashima 90+2'	Stadium: Sagamihara Gion Stadium; Attendance: 744; Referee: Miu Sone

17 September 2022 Matchweek 5	Nippon TV Tokyo Verdy Beleza	2–0	Nojima Stella Kanagawa Sagamihara	Tama
15:00 JST	Fujino 51'; Utsugi 73'	Report (WE League)		Stadium: Tama Athletic Stadium; Attendance: 594; Referee: Kazue Kusadokoro

20 September 2022 Matchweek 5	Sanfrecce Hiroshima Regina	1–1	JEF United Ichihara Chiba Ladies	Hiroshima
19:00 JST	Taniguchi 90'	Report (WE League)	Kamogawa 23'	Stadium: Hiroshima Koiki Park Football Stadium No.1; Attendance: 458; Referee: Asaka Koizumi

25 September 2022 Matchweek 6	INAC Kobe Leonessa	2–1	Sanfrecce Hiroshima Regina	Sakai
15:30 JST	Tanaka 32' (pen.); Narumiya 80'	Report (WE League)	Ueno 30'	Stadium: J-GREEN SAKAI S1 Main Field; Attendance: 969; Referee: Kumiko Matsuo

== Final ==
1 October 2022
16:00 JST

Urawa Red Diamonds Ladies	3–3	Nippon TV Tokyo Verdy Beleza
Seike 75'; Ando 76'; Sugasawa 84'	Report (WE League)	Ueki 25', 29'; Muramatsu 72'
Penalties
Sugasawa (penalty scored); Shiokoshi (penalty scored); Naomoto (penalty scored); Seike (penalty scored)	4–2	(penalty scored) Ueki; (penalty scored) Utsugi; (penalty missed) Miura; (penalty missed) Fujino

Ajinomoto Field Nishigaoka, Kita, Tokyo
Attendance: 3,546
Referee: Asaka Koizumi

== Awards ==
Award	Player	Club
MVP		

== Top scorers ==
As of 1 October 2022

Rank	Player	Club	Goals
1	Riko Ueki	Nippon TV Tokyo Verdy Beleza	6
2	Kozue Ando	Urawa Red Diamonds Ladies	4
3	Yuika Sugasawa	Urawa Red Diamonds Ladies	3
3	Aoba Fujino	Nippon TV Tokyo Verdy Beleza	3
3	Rio Takizawa	AC Nagano Parceiro Ladies	3
6	Miyu Yakata	MyNavi Sendai	2
6	Hikaru Naomoto	Urawa Red Diamonds Ladies	2
6	Kiko Seike	Urawa Red Diamonds Ladies	2
6	Mayu Karahashi	Chifure AS Elfen Saitama	2
6	Miho Kamogawa	JEF United Chiba Ladies	2
6	Tomoko Muramatsu	Nippon TV Tokyo Verdy Beleza	2
6	Kana Fujiwara	Nojima Stella Kanagawa Sagamihara	2
6	Ayaka Michigami	Albirex Niigata Ladies	2
6	Mina Tanaka	INAC Kobe Leonessa	2
6	Moeno Sakaguchi	INAC Kobe Leonessa	2
6	Haruna Kawashima	Sanfrecce Hiroshima Regina	2

== TV broadcasting ==
- BS TV Tokyo Corporation (final match only)

== Internet live streaming ==
- 2022-23 WE League Cup playlist on YouTube (all matches)

== See also ==
- Japan Football Association (JFA)
  - 2023 in Japanese football
    - 2022–23 WE League season
    - 2023 Nadeshiko League
    - 2023 Empress's Cup
