= 2023–24 WE League Cup =

Tournament details
- Country: Japan
- Dates: 26 August – 14 October 2023
- Teams: 12

Final positions
- Champions: Sanfrecce Hiroshima Regina (1st title)
- Runners-up: Albirex Niigata Ladies

Tournament statistics
- Matches played: 31
- Goals scored: 80 (2.58 per match)
- Attendance: 44,501 (1,436 per match)
- Top goal scorer(s): Ayaka Michigami (Albirex Niigata Ladies) (4 goals)

The 2023–24 WE League Cup is the 2nd season of the WE League Cup, a women's football cup tournament. The final of this edition will be played on 14 October 2023.

== Schedule ==
	Matchday	Date
Group stage	1	26–27 August 2023
Group stage	2	2–3 September 2023
Group stage	3	9–10 September 2023
Group stage	4	16–17 September 2023
Group stage	5	30 September – 1 October 2023
Final		14 October 2023

== Group stage ==
=== Group A ===
Pos	Team	Pld	W	D	L	GF	GA	GD	Pts	
1	Sanfrecce Hiroshima Regina	5	4	1	0	10	4	+6	13	Advance to the Final
2	Cerezo Osaka Yanmar	5	3	1	1	8	3	+5	10	
3	Urawa Red Diamonds	5	2	2	1	10	4	+6	8	
4	JEF United Ichihara Chiba	5	1	3	1	5	6	−1	6	
5	Nojima Stella Kanagawa Sagamihara	5	0	2	3	2	9	−7	2	
6	Mynavi Sendai	5	0	1	4	3	12	−9	1	

Source: WE League

26 August 2023 Matchweek 1	Urawa Red Diamonds	2–2	JEF United Ichihara Chiba	Saitama
18:00		Report		Stadium: Urawa Komaba Stadium

26 August 2023 Matchweek 1	Nojima Stella Kanagawa Sagamihara	0–2	Cerezo Osaka Yanmar	Sagamihara
18:00		Report		Stadium: Sagamihara Gion Stadium

26 August 2023 Matchweek 1	Sanfrecce Hiroshima Regina	4–1	Mynavi Sendai	Hiroshima
18:30		Report		Stadium: HIROSHIMA FOOTBALL STADIUM #1

2 September 2023 Matchweek 2	Mynavi Sendai	0–1	JEF United Ichihara Chiba	Sendai
18:00		Report		Stadium: Yurtec Stadium Sendai

2 September 2023 Matchweek 2	Nojima Stella Kanagawa Sagamihara	0–4	Urawa Red Diamonds	Sagamihara
18:00		Report		Stadium: Sagamihara Gion Stadium

3 September 2023 Matchweek 2	Cerezo Osaka Yanmar	1–2	Sanfrecce Hiroshima Regina	Osaka
18:00		Report		Stadium: Yodoko Sakura Stadium

9 September 2023 Matchweek 3	Mynavi Sendai	0–3	Urawa Red Diamonds	Sendai
18:00		Report		Stadium: Yurtec Stadium Sendai

9 September 2023 Matchweek 3	Sanfrecce Hiroshima Regina	1–0	Nojima Stella Kanagawa Sagamihara	Hiroshima
18:00		Report		Stadium: Hiroshima Football Stadium 1

10 September 2023 Matchweek 3	JEF United Ichihara Chiba	0–2	Cerezo Osaka Yanmar	Chiba
18:00		Report		Stadium: Fukuda Denshi Arena

16 September 2023 Matchweek 4	Cerezo Osaka Yanmar	3–1	Mynavi Sendai	Osaka
15:00		Report		Stadium: Yodoko Sakura Stadium

17 September 2023 Matchweek 4	Urawa Red Diamonds	1–2	Sanfrecce Hiroshima Regina	Saitama
15:00		Report		Stadium: Urawa Komaba Stadium

17 September 2023 Matchweek 4	Nojima Stella Kanagawa Sagamihara	1–1	JEF United Ichihara Chiba	Sagamihara
15:00		Report		Stadium: Sagamihara Gion Stadium

30 September 2023 Matchweek 5	JEF United Ichihara Chiba	1–1	Sanfrecce Hiroshima Regina	Ichihara
13:00		Report		Stadium: ZA Oripri Stadium

1 October 2023 Matchweek 5	Cerezo Osaka Yanmar	0–0	Urawa Red Diamonds	Osaka
12:00		Report		Stadium: Yodoko Sakura Stadium

1 October 2023 Matchweek 5	Mynavi Sendai	1–1	Nojima Stella Kanagawa Sagamihara	Sendai
13:00		Report		Stadium: Yurtec Stadium Sendai

=== Group B ===
Pos	Team	Pld	W	D	L	GF	GA	GD	Pts	
1	Albirex Niigata	5	2	2	1	9	6	+3	8	Advance to the Final
2	Omiya Ardija Ventus	5	2	2	1	6	4	+2	8	
3	Chifure AS Elfen Saitama	5	2	1	2	8	7	+1	7	
4	Nippon TV Tokyo Verdy Beleza	5	2	1	2	8	12	−4	7	
5	INAC Kobe Leonessa	5	2	0	3	6	8	−2	6	
6	AC Nagano Parceiro	5	1	2	2	6	6	0	5	

Source: WE League

26 August 2023 Matchweek 1	Nippon TV Tokyo Verdy Beleza	2–1	AC Nagano Parceiro	Tokyo
18:00		Report		Stadium: Ajinomoto Field Nishigaoka

27 August 2023 Matchweek 1	Albirex Niigata	4–1	Chifure AS Elfen Saitama	Niigata
18:02		Report		Stadium: Niigata Athletic Stadium

27 August 2023 Matchweek 1	Nojima Stella Kanagawa Sagamihara	4–1	INAC Kobe Leonessa	Saitama
18:03		Report		Stadium: NACK5 Stadium Omiya

2 September 2023 Matchweek 2	Chifure AS Elfen Saitama	2–0	Omiya Ardija Ventus	Kumagaya
18:00		Report		Stadium: Kumagaya Athletic Stadium

3 September 2023 Matchweek 2	AC Nagano Parceiro	3–1	INAC Kobe Leonessa	Nagano
18:00		Report		Stadium: Nagano U Stadium

3 September 2023 Matchweek 2	Nippon TV Tokyo Verdy Beleza	3–2	Albirex Niigata	Tokyo
19:01		Report		Stadium: Ajinomoto Field Nishigaoka

9 September 2023 Matchweek 3	Albirex Niigata	2–2	AC Nagano Parceiro	Niigata
17:00		Report		Stadium: Denka Big Swan Stadium

10 September 2023 Matchweek 3	INAC Kobe Leonessa	1–0	Chifure AS Elfen Saitama	Kobe
16:00		Report		Stadium: Noevir Stadium Kobe

10 September 2023 Matchweek 3	Omiya Ardija Ventus	1–1	Nippon TV Tokyo Verdy Beleza	Saitama
18:03		Report		Stadium: NACK5 Stadium Omiya

17 September 2023 Matchweek 4	Albirex Niigata	0–0	Omiya Ardija Ventus	Niigata
16:00		Report		Stadium: Denka Big Swan Stadium

17 September 2023 Matchweek 4	Nippon TV Tokyo Verdy Beleza	0–3	INAC Kobe Leonessa	Tokyo
18:00		Report		Stadium: Ajinomoto Field Nishigaoka

17 September 2023 Matchweek 4	AC Nagano Parceiro	0–0	Chifure AS Elfen Saitama	Nagano
18:00		Report		Stadium: Nagano U Stadium

1 October 2023 Matchweek 5	Omiya Ardija Ventus	1–0	AC Nagano Parceiro	Saitama
14:00		Report		Stadium: NACK5 Stadium Omiya

1 October 2023 Matchweek 5	Chifure AS Elfen Saitama	5–2	Nippon TV Tokyo Verdy Beleza	Kawagoe
15:00		Report		Stadium: Kawagoe Stadium

1 October 2023 Matchweek 5	INAC Kobe Leonessa	0–1	Albirex Niigata	Osaka
15:00		Report		Stadium: Yodoko Sakura Stadium

== Final ==
14 October 2023
16:03 JST

Sanfrecce Hiroshima Regina	0–0	Albirex Niigata
	Report (WE League)
Penalties
	4–2

Kawasaki Todoroki Stadium, Kawasaki, Kanagawa
Attendance: 6,261

== Statistics ==
=== Top scorer ===
Rank	Player	Club	Goal(s)
1	Ayaka Michigami	Albirex Niigata Ladies	4
2	Yuika Sugasawa	Urawa Red Diamonds Ladies	3
2	Ayaka Inoue	Omiya Ardija Ventus	3
2	Miho Kamogawa	JEF United Ichihara Chiba Ladies	3
2	Moemi Ishibuchi	Albirex Niigata Ladies	3
2	Miyu Yakata	Cerezo Osaka Yanmar Ladies	3
7	Emi Nakajima	Mynavi Sendai Ladies	2
7	Hanon Nishio	Urawa Red Diamonds Ladies	2
7	Kozue Setoguchi	Chifure AS Elfen Saitama	2
7	Riko Yoshida	Chifure AS Elfen Saitama	2
7	Haruka Osawa	JEF United Ichihara Chiba Ladies	2
7	Riko Ueki	Nippon TV Tokyo Verdy Beleza	2
7	Aoba Fujino	Nippon TV Tokyo Verdy Beleza	2
7	Akimi Kawafune	AC Nagano Parceiro Ladies	2
7	Yui Narumiya	INAC Kobe Leonessa	2
7	Ai Ogawa	Sanfrecce Hiroshima Regina	2
7	Yoshino Nakashima	Sanfrecce Hiroshima Regina	2
7	Miyuki Takahashi	Sanfrecce Hiroshima Regina	2

== Internet live streaming ==
- WE League Cup live

== See also ==
- Japan Football Association (JFA)
- 2023 in association football
- 2023 in Japanese football
- 2023–24 WE League season
- 2023 Nadeshiko League
