= 2022 Empress's Cup =

Football tournament season

(Japanese: 皇后杯 JFA 第44回全日本女子サッカー選手権大会)
- Dates: 26 November 2022 – 28 January 2023

Final positions
- Champions: Nippon TV Tokyo Verdy Beleza (16th title)

Tournament statistics
- Matches played: 46
- Goals scored: 149 (3.24 per match)

The 2022 Empress's Cup was the 44th season of the Japanese women's football main cup competition. All the non-relegated teams from the 1st and 2nd division of the 2021 Nadeshiko League (except for Tsukuba FC) automatically qualified to the first and second round (allocated to Nadeshiko League Top 3), while all 11 teams from the 2022–23 WE League earned an automatic entry to the Round of 16.

== Calendar and format ==
Below are the dates for each round as given by the official schedule:

Round	Date(s)	Number of fixtures	Clubs
First Round	26 & 27 November 2022	17	34 → 17
Second round	3 & 4 December 2022	10	20 (17+3) → 10
Third round	10 & 11 December 2022	5	10 → 5
Round of 16	17 & 18 December 2022	8	16 (11+5) → 8
Quarter-finals	15 January 2023	4	8 → 4
Semi-finals	22 January 2023	2	4 → 2
Final	28 January 2023	1	2 → 1

== Participating clubs ==
2021–22 WE League season All 11 clubs join in the fourth round	2021 Nadeshiko League; Top 3 clubs join in the second round	2021 Nadeshiko League; 17 clubs join in the first round	Non-league entrants All 17 clubs join in the first round
AC Nagano Parceiro; Albirex Niigata; Chifure AS Elfen Saitama; INAC Kobe Leonessa; JEF United Chiba; MyNavi Sendai; Nojima Stella Kanagawa Sagamihara; Omiya Ardija; Sanfrecce Hiroshima Regina; Tokyo Verdy Beleza; Urawa Red Diamonds	AS Harima Albion; Iga FC Kunoichi; Sfida Setagaya	Ange Violet Hiroshima; Bunnys GFC White Star; Cerezo Osaka Sakai; Diosa Izumo; Ehime FC; NGU Loveledge Nagoya; Nittaidai SMG Yokohama; Orca Kamogawa; Speranza Osaka-Takatsuki; Yokohama FC Seagulls; Fukuoka J. Anclas; JFA Academy Fukushima; KIU Charme Okayama; Norddea Hokkaido; Okayama Yunogo Belle; Shizuoka SSU Bonita	Aichi: Aichi Toho University; Ehime: FC Imabari; Ishikawa: Lily Wolf F Ishikawa; Hokkaido: Sapporo University Vista; Hyōgo: Hinomoto Gakuen High School; Kagoshima: Kamimura Gakuen High School; Kanagawa: SEISA OSA Rhea Shonan; Miyagi: Tokiwagi Gakuen High School LSC; Miyazaki: Viamaterras Miyazaki; Okayama: Sakuyo High School; Osaka: Daisho Gakuen High School; Saitama: Toyo University; Shizuoka: Fujieda Junshin High School; Yamanashi: FC Fujizakura Yamanashi; Tokyo 1: Tokai University; Tokyo 2: Tokyo International University; Tokyo 3: Waseda University

== First round ==
27 November 2022 Match 1	Tokyo International University	0−4	Viamaterras Miyazaki	Miki
11:00		Report (JFA); Report (JFA)	Own goal 11' (o.g.); Saito 31'; Shimada 45+2'; Kakazu 64'	Stadium: Miki Athletic Stadium; Attendance: 101; Referee: Nanako Iwamoto

26 November 2022 Match 2	Ange Violet Hiroshima	5−0	Okayama Yunogo Belle	Tottori
14:00	Konomi 12', 20', 27'; Kanda 54'; Shinjo 77'	Report (JFA); Report (JFA)		Stadium: Axis Bird Stadium; Attendance: 325; Referee: Maki Yoshinaga

26 November 2022 Match 3	Toyo University	5−0	Norddea Hokkaido	Ishinomaki
13:30	Inayama 14', 54'; Kitagawa 26'; Kadowaki 47', 60'	Report (JFA); Report (JFA)		Stadium: Ishinomaki Sports Park Football Field; Attendance: 169; Referee: Chihiro Ueda

27 November 2022 Match 4	Tokiwagi Gakuen High School LSC	2−1	FC Imabari	Ishinomaki
10:30	Ito 77'; Shiraki 79'	Report (JFA); Report (JFA)	Ochi 32'	Stadium: Ishinomaki Sports Park Football Field; Attendance: 253; Referee: Hisae Yoshizawa

27 November 2022 Match 5	Ehime FC	2−0	Lily Wolf F Ishikawa	Miki
14:00	Hiratsuka 45'; Sakurai 67'	Report (JFA); Report (JFA)		Stadium: Miki Athletic Stadium; Attendance: 151; Referee: Yurika Araki

26 November 2022 Match 6	SEISA OSA Rhea Shonan	1−1 (a.e.t.) (5–4 p)	Aichi Toho University	Iga
10:30	Suzuki 1'	Report (JFA); Report (JFA)	Kamiya 55'	Stadium: Ueno Sports Park; Attendance: 153; Referee: Ryoka Nagano
	Penalties
	Natsume (penalty scored); Takahashi (penalty scored); Miyamoto (penalty missed); Suzuki (penalty scored); Kuniyoshi (penalty scored); Endo (penalty scored)		Chiina (penalty scored); Koketsu (penalty missed); Hirosaki (penalty scored); Ogawa (penalty scored); Daido (penalty scored); Yonezawa (penalty missed)

27 November 2022 Match 7	Fujieda Junshin High School	3−0	Fukuoka J. Anclas	Fujieda
13:30	Tsujisawa 23', 36', 42'	Report (JFA); Report (JFA)		Stadium: Fujieda Soccer Stadium; Attendance: 224; Referee: Kumi Hiruma

26 November 2022 Match 8	Speranza Osaka-Takatsuki	1−2	University of Tsukuba	Fujieda
13:30	Mochida 58'	Report (JFA); Report (JFA)	Hiranaka 44'; Yamada 90+2'	Stadium: Fujieda Soccer Stadium; Attendance: 118; Referee: Isako Onoda

26 November 2022 Match 9	Sakuyo High School	2−1	Kamimura Gakuen High School	Miki
14:00	Yuba 37'; Ishida 52'	Report (JFA); Report (JFA)	Kuroiwa 14'	Stadium: Miki Athletic Stadium; Attendance: 116; Referee: Erina Kokushi

26 November 2022 Match 10	Cerezo Osaka Sakai	6−0	Hinomoto Gakuen High School	Miki
11:00	Koyama 17'; Momono 23'; Takawa 29', 36', 63'; Tsutsui 90'	Report (JFA); Report (JFA)		Stadium: Miki Athletic Stadium; Attendance: 244; Referee: Emi Yamauchi

26 November 2022 Match 11	KIU Charme Okayama	1−4	Shizuoka SSU Bonita	Fujieda
10:30	Unoki 27'	Report (JFA); Report (JFA)	Miwa 42'; Nakagawa 65'; Koike 75', 90+1'	Stadium: Fujieda Soccer Stadium; Attendance: 148; Referee: Yoko Yasunami

27 November 2022 Match 12	Nittaidai SMG Yokohama	0−1	Fujizakura Yamanashi	Fujieda
10:30		Report (JFA); Report (JFA)	Hamana 45+1'	Stadium: Fujieda Soccer Stadium; Attendance: 168; Referee: Mizuki Yoshida

26 November 2022 Match 13	Yokohama FC Seagulls	2−1	JFA Academy Fukushima	Iga
13:30	Kurata 9'; Uchida 90+4'	Report (JFA); Report (JFA)	Matsukubo 22'	Stadium: Ueno Sports Park; Attendance: 192; Referee: Kyoko Kondo

27 November 2022 Match 14	Orca Kamogawa	4−0	Daisho Gakuen High School	Iga
13:00	Matsuo 5', 45+2'; Kaneshige 66'; Kira 69'	Report (JFA); Report (JFA)		Stadium: Ueno Sports Park; Attendance: 182; Referee: Chikako Matozaki

26 November 2022 Match 15	Diosa Izumo	3−0	Tokai University	Tottori
11:00	Ichihara 45+1'; Thays 61'; Yamamoto 85'	Report (JFA); Report (JFA)		Stadium: Axis Bird Stadium; Attendance: 245; Referee: Minami Akagi

26 November 2022 Match 16	NGU Loveledge Nagoya	6−0	Sapporo University Vista	Ishinomaki
10:30	Yamada 4', 11', 77'; Ezaki 24'; Mizuno 33'; Ueda 75'	Report (JFA); Report (JFA)		Stadium: Ishinomaki Sports Park Football Field; Attendance: 108; Referee: Tomoe Iguchi

27 November 2022 Match 17	Bunnys Gunma FC White Star	1−3	Waseda University	Ishinomaki
13:30	Oya 85'	Report (JFA); Report (JFA)	Kasahara 21', 74'; Takahashi 87'	Stadium: Ishinomaki Sports Park Football Field; Attendance: 135; Referee: Misaki Katsumata

== Second round ==
3 December 2022 Match 18	Sfida Setagaya	3−1	Viamaterras Miyazaki	Miyazaki
13:30	Otake 17', 77'; Horie 26'	Report (JFA); Report (JFA)	Asuka 72'	Stadium: Miyazaki Athletic Park Stadium; Attendance: 458; Referee: Misato Sugimoto

4 December 2022 Match 19	Ange Violet Hiroshima	0−4	Toyo University	Sakai
10:30		Report (JFA); Report (JFA)	Kitagawa 6'; Inayama 43'; Kadowaki 47'; Muraoka 67'	Stadium: Nitto Shinko Stadium Maruoka; Attendance: 130; Referee: Yoko Yasunami

3 December 2022 Match 20	Iga FC Kunoichi	2−0	Tokiwagi Gakuen High School LSC	Ishinomaki
10:30	Sakuma 9'; Fujita 41'	Report (JFA); Report (JFA)		Stadium: Ishinomaki Sports Park Football Field; Attendance: 210; Referee: Nanako Tanimoto

3 December 2022 Match 21	Ehime FC	3−2	SEISA OSA Rhea Shonan	Utsunomiya
14:00	Fujisawa 12'; Kojima 15'; hiratsuka 90+5'	Report (JFA); Report (JFA)	Nakajima 3'; Takahashi 48'	Stadium: Tochigi Green Stadium; Attendance: 70; Referee: Minako Ito

3 December 2022 Match 22	AS Harima Albion	6−3 (a.e.t.)	Fujieda Junshin High School	Sakai
13:30	Shinbori 2', 103'; Chiba 26', 63'; Nakano 93'; Inowaki 112'	Report (JFA); Report (JFA)	Kubota 5'; Masano 51'; Hamano 57'	Stadium: Nitto Shinko Stadium Maruoka; Attendance: 103; Referee: Narumi Baba

3 December 2022 Match 23	University of Tsukuba	0−1	Sakuyo High School	Miyazaki
10:30		Report (JFA); Report (JFA)	Okura 50'	Stadium: Miyazaki Athletic Park Stadium; Attendance: 132; Referee: Kyoko Kondo

3 December 2022 Match 24	Cerezo Osaka Sakai	0−0 (a.e.t.) (5–4 p)	Shizuoka SSU Bonita	Sakai
10:30		Report (JFA); Report (JFA)		Stadium: Nitto Shinko Stadium Maruoka; Attendance: 120; Referee: Marika Iwamoto
	Penalties
	Tsutsui (penalty scored); Maegawa (penalty scored); Yoneda (penalty scored); Matsumoto (penalty missed); Ogikubo (penalty scored); Tanaka (penalty missed); Wada (penalty scored)		Yamada (penalty scored); Watanabe (penalty scored); Takashima (penalty scored); Kamiyanagi (penalty missed); Shiozawa (penalty scored); Hikosaka (penalty missed); Kojima (penalty missed)

3 December 2022 Match 25	Fujizakura Yamanashi	0−3	Yokohama FC Seagulls	Ishinomaki
13:30		Report (JFA); Report (JFA)	Katayama 22'; Uchida 32', 61'	Stadium: Ishinomaki Sports Park Football Field; Attendance: 153; Referee: Satomi Inaba

4 December 2022 Match 26	Orca Kamogawa	5−0	Diosa Izumo	Sakai
13:30	Saito 24'; Urashima 67', 82'; Fuchigami 78'; Namiki 84'	Report (JFA); Report (JFA)		Stadium: Nitto Shinko Stadium Maruoka; Attendance: 81; Referee: Mizuki Yoshida

3 December 2022 Match 27	NGU Loveledge Nagoya	1−2	Waseda University	Utsunomiya
11:00	Yamada 69'	Report (JFA); Report (JFA)	Takahashi 27'; Tsukiji 76'	Stadium: Tochigi Green Stadium; Attendance: 77; Referee: Maiko Hagio

== Third round ==
10 December 2022 Match 28	Sfida Setagaya	6−0	Toyo University	Utsunomiya
11:00	Mitsumoto 7', 18'; Horie 12', 38'; Kurakami 66', 76'	Report (JFA); Report (JFA)		Stadium: Tochigi Green Stadium; Attendance: 224; Referee: Chihiro Ueda

10 December 2022 Match 29	Iga FC Kunoichi	1−1 (6–5 p)	Ehime FC	Miki
11:00	Nishibayashi 83'	Report (JFA); Report (JFA)	Hiratsuka 56'	Stadium: Miki Athletic Stadium; Attendance: 192; Referee: Chikako Matozaki
	Penalties
	Okino (penalty scored); Tsuneda (penalty scored); Kawasaki (penalty scored); Shimano (penalty scored); Ogawa (penalty missed); Miyasako (penalty scored); Mori (penalty scored)		Hiratsuka (penalty missed); Taketa (penalty scored); Maeda (penalty scored); Murakami (penalty scored); Osajima (penalty scored); Mitsunaga (penalty scored); Kamimura (penalty missed)

10 December 2022 Match 30	AS Harima Albion	2−0	Sakuyo High School	Miki
14:00	Chiba 69'; Yoshida 77'	Report (JFA); Report (JFA)		Stadium: Miki Athletic Stadium; Attendance: 289; Referee: Marika Iwamoto

11 December 2022 Match 31	Cerezo Osaka Sakai	2−3	Yokohama FC Seagulls	Miki
13:00	Tabata 39', 54'	Report (JFA); Report (JFA)	Uchida 43'; Miyashita 66'; Kobayashi 81'	Stadium: Miki Athletic Stadium; Attendance: 284; Referee: Michiko Fujita

10 December 2022 Match 32	Orca Kamogawa	0−0 (4–5 p)	Waseda University	Utsunomiya
14:00		Report (JFA); Report (JFA)		Stadium: Tochigi Green Stadium; Attendance: 163; Referee: Kumi Hiruma
	Penalties
	Urashima (penalty scored); Kira (penalty scored); Yamashita (penalty missed); Yamada (penalty scored); Kodama (penalty scored); Yamada (penalty missed)		Yoshino (penalty scored); Takahashi (penalty scored); Tsukiji (penalty scored); Munakata (penalty scored); Inoue (penalty missed); Urabe

== Round of 16 ==
18 December 2022 Match 33	MyNavi Sendai	1−4	Tokyo Verdy Beleza	Utsunomiya
14:00	Yakata 65'	Report (JFA); Report (JFA)	Ueki 1', 38'; Kitamura 11'; Kobayashi 17'	Stadium: Kanseki Stadium Tochigi; Attendance: 452; Referee: Mari Yamamoto

18 December 2022 Match 34	Sanfrecce Hiroshima Regina	1−0	Yokohama FC Seagulls	Hiroshima
13:00	Shiota 41'	Report (JFA); Report (JFA)		Stadium: Hiroshima Regional Park No.1 Football Stadium; Attendance: 568; Referee: Chihiro Ikki

17 December 2022 Match 35	Albirex Niigata	2−0	JEF United Chiba	Utsunomiya
14:00	Michigami 2', 57'	Report (JFA); Report (JFA)		Stadium: Tochigi Green Stadium; Attendance: 305; Referee: Saori Takahashi

17 December 2022 Match 36	Omiya Ardija Ventus	1−0	Waseda University	Utsunomiya
11:00	Yamazaki 2'	Report (JFA); Report (JFA)		Stadium: Tochigi Green Stadium; Attendance: 291; Referee: Satomi Arakawa

18 December 2022 Match 37	Urawa Red Diamonds	2−1	Nagano Parceiro	Utsunomiya
11:00	Naomoto 5'; Sugasawa 18'	Report (JFA); Report (JFA)	Okutsu 45+1'	Stadium: Kanseki Stadium Tochigi; Attendance: 887; Referee: Kazue Kusadokoro

18 December 2022 Match 38	INAC Kobe Leonessa	2−1	AS Harima Albion	Miki
14:00	Tanaka 7'; Hamano 56'	Report (JFA); Report (JFA)	Shinbori 17'	Stadium: Miki Athletic Stadium; Attendance: 684; Referee: Miu Sone

18 December 2022 Match 39	Nojima Stella Kanagawa Sagamihara	1−0	Sfida Setagaya	Miki
11:00	Matsumoto 1'	Report (JFA); Report (JFA)		Stadium: Miki Athletic Stadium; Attendance: 282; Referee: Kumi Hiruma

18 December 2022 Match 40	Chifure AS Elfen Saitama	2−1 (a.e.t.)	Iga FC Kunoichi	Fujieda
13:00	Kishi 86'; Nishikawa 98'	Report (JFA); Report (JFA)	Mori 55'	Stadium: Fujieda Soccer Stadium; Attendance: 213; Referee: Junko Kirihara

== Quarter-finals ==
15 January 2023 Match 41	Tokyo Verdy Beleza	3−0	Sanfrecce Hiroshima Regina	Utsunomiya
14:00	Ueki 44', 78'; Fujino 67'	Report (JFA); Report (JFA)		Stadium: Kanseki Stadium Tochigi; Attendance: 664; Referee: Satomi Arakawa

15 January 2023 Match 42	Albirex Niigata	1−0	Omiya Ardija Ventus	Miki
13:00	Michigami 90+2'	Report (JFA); Report (JFA)		Stadium: Miki Athletic Stadium; Attendance: 364; Referee: Kumi Hiruma

15 January 2023 Match 43	Urawa Red Diamonds	1−2	INAC Kobe Leonessa	Utsunomiya
18:00	Ando 75'	Report (JFA); Report (JFA)	Narumiya 21', 23'	Stadium: Kanseki Stadium Tochigi; Attendance: 799; Referee: Emi Chiba

15 January 2023 Match 44	Nojima Stella Kanagawa Sagamihara	0−2	Chifure AS Elfen Saitama	Hiroshima
13:00		Report (JFA); Report (JFA)	Nishikawa 31'; Miura 57'	Stadium: Hiroshima Regional Park No.1 Football Stadium; Attendance: 144; Referee: Misako Kajiyama

== Semi-finals ==
22 January 2023 Match 45	Tokyo Verdy Beleza	3−1	Albirex Niigata	Kameoka
13:00	Fujino 3'; Ueki 12', 66'	Report (JFA); Report (JFA)	Own goal 51' (o.g.)	Stadium: Sanga Stadium by Kyocera; Attendance: 1,019; Referee: Asaka Koizumi

22 January 2023 Match 46	INAC Kobe Leonessa	2−1	Chifure AS Elfen Saitama	Kameoka
16:00	Takase 32'; Narumiya 62'	Report (JFA); Report (JFA)	Yoshida 39'	Stadium: Sanga Stadium by Kyocera; Attendance: 1,398; Referee: Haruna Kanematsu

== Final ==
28 January 2023 Match 47	Tokyo Verdy Beleza	4−0	INAC Kobe Leonessa	Osaka
15:00	Ueki 39', 49'; Kobayashi 81'; Fujino 90'	Report (JFA); Report (JFA)		Stadium: Yodoko Sakura Stadium; Attendance: 1,939; Referee: Yoshimi Yamashita

== Top scorers ==
As of 22 January 2023.

Rank	Player	Club	Goals
1	(Japan) Riko Ueki	Tokyo Verdy Beleza	6
2	(Japan) Misuzu Uchida	Yokohama FC Seagulls	4
2	(Japan) Nina Yamada	NGU Loveledge Nagoya	4
4	(Japan) Sonoko Chiba	AS Harima Albion	3
4	(Japan) Miyu Inayama	Toyo University	3
4	(Japan) Maki Hiratsuka	Ehime FC	3
4	(Japan) Mitsuki Horie	Sfida Setagaya	3
4	(Japan) Mai Kadowaki	Toyo University	3
4	(Japan) Taketoya Konomi	Ange Violet Hiroshima	3
4	(Japan) Ayaka Michigami	Albirex Niigata	3
4	(Japan) Yui Narumiya	INAC Kobe Leonessa	3
4	(Japan) Kanami Shinbori	AS Harima Albion	3
4	(Japan) Seriwa Takawa	Cerezo Osaka Sakai	3
4	(Japan) Ai Tsujisawa	Fujieda Junshin High School	3
