= 2023–24 WE League =

Third season of the top Japanese women's association football league

WE League
- Season: 2023–24
- Dates: 11 November 2023 – 25 May 2024
- Champions: Urawa Reds (2nd title)
- AFC Champions League: Urawa Reds
- Matches: 132
- Goals: 326 (2.47 per match)
- Top goalscorer: Kiko Seike (20 goals)
- Biggest away win: Mynavi Sendai 0–5 NTV Tokyo Verdy Beleza (26 November 2023); Nojima Stella Kanagawa 0–5 Urawa Reds (16 March 2024)
- Highest scoring: AC Nagano Parceiro 3–5 Urawa Reds (31 March 2024)
- Longest winning run: 6 matches (Urawa Reds)
- Longest unbeaten run: 13 matches (INAC Kobe Leonessa)
- Longest winless run: 13 matches (Nojima Stella Kanagawa)
- Longest losing run: 5 matches (Nojima Stella Kanagawa)
- Highest attendance: 5,306 (18 November 2023); Mynavi Sendai 0–3 INAC Kobe Leonessa
- Lowest attendance: 575 (9 December 2023); JEF United Chiba 1–1 Sanfrecce Hiroshima Regina
- Total attendance: 227,377
- Average attendance: 1,722

The 2023–24 WE League season (Japanese: 2023–24 WEリーグ, Hepburn: 2023–24 WE Rīgu) was the 3rd season of the WE League since its establishment in 2020. The league begin on 11 November 2023 and end on 25 May 2024.

== Overview ==
This season, the league expanded to 12 teams with the inclusion of Cerezo Osaka Yanmar Ladies, who will play in the WE League for the first time after playing in the Nadeshiko League Division 1 in the 2022 season.

== Teams ==
Locations of the 2023–24 WE League teams
Locations of the WE League teams in and near Tokyo

Team	Location	Ground	Capacity	2022–23 season
AC Nagano Parceiro	Nagano	Nagano U Stadium	15,491	7th
Albirex Niigata	Niigata	Denka Big Swan Stadium	42,300	10th
Albirex Niigata	Niigata	Niigata Athletic Stadium	18,671	10th
Chifure AS Elfen Saitama	Kumagaya	Kumagaya Athletic Stadium	15,392	11th
Cerezo Osaka Yanmar	Osaka	Yodoko Sakura Stadium	15,392	2022 Nadeshiko League Division 1, 4th
INAC Kobe Leonessa	Kobe	Noevir Stadium Kobe	30,132	2nd
JEF United Chiba	Chiba	Fukuda Denshi Arena	19,781	8th
JEF United Chiba	Ichihara	ZA Oripri Stadium	14,051	8th
MyNavi Sendai	Sendai	Yurtec Stadium Sendai	19,694	4th
Nojima Stella Kanagawa Sagamihara	Sagamihara	Sagamihara Gion Stadium	15,300	9th
Omiya Ardija Ventus	Saitama	NACK5 Stadium Omiya	15,500	6th
Sanfrecce Hiroshima Regina	Hiroshima	Hiroshima Koiki Park Football Stadium	6,000	5th
Nippon TV Tokyo Verdy Beleza	Kita, Tokyo	Ajinomoto Field Nishigaoka	7,258	3rd
Urawa Red Diamonds	Saitama	Urawa Komaba Stadium	21,500	1st

=== Personnel and kits ===
Team	Manager	Kit manufacturer	Shirt sponsor
AC Nagano Parceiro	(Japan) Ryu Hirose	Penalty	Hokto
Albirex Niigata	(Japan) Kazuaki Hashikawa	X-girl	Kameda Seika
Chifure AS Elfen Saitama	(Japan) Takashi Ikegaya	X-girl	Chifure
Cerezo Osaka Yanmar	(Japan) Nobuhito Toriizuka	X-girl	Yanmar
INAC Kobe Leonessa	(Spain) Jordi Ferrón	Hummel	Mondahmin (Home kit); Earth Corporation (Away kit)
JEF United Chiba	(Japan) Shoko Mikami	X-girl	Furukawa Electric
MyNavi Sendai	(Japan) Shigemitsu Sudo	X-girl	Mynavi
Nojima Stella Kanagawa Sagamihara	(Japan) Masaaki Kanno	X-girl	tvk
Omiya Ardija Ventus	(Japan) Rina Yanai	Under Armour	ahamo
Sanfrecce Hiroshima Regina	(Japan) Shin Nakamura	Nike	EDION
Nippon TV Tokyo Verdy Beleza	(Japan) Takeo Matsuda	Athleta	Coca-Cola
Urawa Red Diamonds	(Japan) Naoki Kusunose	Nike	Mitsubishi Heavy Industries

=== Foreign players ===
The JFA subsidizes salaries for players from Southeast Asian member federations, while the league itself subsidizes players from top-ranked FIFA countries.

Club	Player 1	Player 2	Player 3	Player 4	Player 5	Player 6	Former players
Albirex Niigata							
Cerezo Osaka Yanmar	(Indonesia) Zahra Muzdalifah						
Chifure AS Elfen Saitama	(United States) Sakura Yoshida						
INAC Kobe Leonessa							
JEF United Chiba	(Jamaica) Vyan Sampson						
MyNavi Sendai	(Cameroon) Aurelle Awona	(Nigeria) Chidinma Okeke	(Spain) Carla Bautista	(Spain) Paula Guerrero	(Thailand) Janista Jinantuya	(Thailand) Chatchawan Rodthong	
Nagano Parceiro	(Thailand) Taneekarn Dangda	(Thailand) Nutwadee Pram-nak					
Nojima Stella Kanagawa							
Omiya Ardija Ventus							
Sanfrecce Hiroshima Regina							
Tokyo Verdy Beleza							
Urawa Red Diamonds							

== League table ==
Pos	Team	Pld	W	D	L	GF	GA	GD	Pts	Qualification
1	Urawa Red Diamonds (C)	22	18	3	1	55	17	+38	57	Qualification to the 2024–25 AFC Women's Champions League
2	INAC Kobe Leonessa	22	15	4	3	39	12	+27	49	
3	Nippon TV Tokyo Verdy Beleza	22	13	7	2	47	18	+29	46	
4	Albirex Niigata	22	13	2	7	26	18	+8	41	
5	Sanfrecce Hiroshima Regina	22	9	4	9	26	25	+1	31	
6	JEF United Chiba	22	6	7	9	18	23	−5	25	
7	Omiya Ardija Ventus	22	7	4	11	17	32	−15	25	
8	Chifure AS Elfen Saitama	22	7	2	13	20	29	−9	23	
9	Cerezo Osaka Yanmar	22	6	3	13	19	31	−12	21	
10	MyNavi Sendai	22	5	6	11	22	40	−18	21	
11	AC Nagano Parceiro	22	4	6	12	21	40	−19	18	
12	Nojima Stella Kanagawa Sagamihara	22	3	4	15	16	41	−25	13	

Source: WE League, WE League Data Site
Rules for classification: 1) Points;2) Goal difference;3) Number of goals scored.
(C) Champions

== Results ==
Home \ Away	ALB	BEL	CER	ELF	JEF	KOB	MYN	NAG	NOJ	OMI	REG	URA
Albirex Niigata		1–0	1–0	1–0	2–1	0–2	2–1	4–1	2–0	0–1	0–2	2–0
Nippon TV Tokyo Verdy Beleza	2–1		1–1	0–0	2–1	0–1	3–0	3–1	3–1	7–0	2–1	2–2
Cerezo Osaka Yanmar	1–0	1–1		0–1	1–0	1–2	1–2	0–1	3–3	2–1	0–2	0–4
Chifure AS Elfen Saitama	1–2	1–2	0–1		0–1	0–3	1–3	1–0	2–1	2–1	2–1	1–2
JEF United Chiba	0–0	1–3	0–2	1–0		2–1	1–0	2–0	1–1	1–1	1–1	1–2
INAC Kobe Leonessa	1–0	0–0	3–1	3–0	2–0		4–1	3–0	2–0	1–1	1–0	0–2
MyNavi Sendai	1–3	0–5	2–1	2–1	0–0	0–3		1–1	1–1	1–2	1–2	0–3
AC Nagano Parceiro	0–0	0–3	1–2	1–1	2–1	1–1	2–2		2–3	1–2	1–0	3–5
Nojima Stella Kanagawa Sagamihara	0–1	0–2	2–1	2–1	0–2	0–3	0–2	1–1		0–1	0–1	0–5
Omiya Ardija Ventus	1–2	0–1	1–0	0–2	0–0	0–2	0–0	0–1	1–0		1–2	0–4
Sanfrecce Hiroshima Regina	1–2	2–2	1–0	0–2	1–1	2–0	2–2	2–0	2–1	0–2		1–2
Urawa Red Diamonds	2–0	3–3	2–0	2–1	2–0	1–1	2–0	3–1	2–0	3–1	2–0	

Source: WE League, WE League Data Site
Legend: Blue = home team win; Yellow = draw; Red = away team win.

== Season statistics ==
=== Top scorers ===
Rank	Player	Club	Goals
1	(Japan) Kiko Seike (清家 貴子)	Urawa Reds	20
2	(Japan) Mami Ueno (上野 真実)	Sanfrecce Hiroshima Regina	11
3	(Japan) Nanami Kitamura (藤野 あおば)	NTV Tokyo Verdy Beleza	9
3	(Japan) Mei Shimada (島田 芽依)	Urawa Reds	9
5	(Japan) Mina Tanaka (田中 美南)	INAC Kobe Leonessa	8
6	(Japan) Megumi Ito (伊藤 めぐみ)	AC Nagano Parceiro	7
6	(Japan) Maho Hirosawa (廣澤 真穂)	Mynavi Sendai	7
8	(Japan) Miyu Yakata (矢形 海優)	Cerezo Osaka Yanmar	6
8	(Japan) Hikaru Kitagawa (北川 ひかる)	INAC Kobe Leonessa	6
8	(Japan) Nanami Kitamura (北村 菜々美)	NTV Tokyo Verdy Beleza	6
8	(Japan) Yuzuki Yamamoto (山本 柚月)	NTV Tokyo Verdy Beleza	6
8	(Japan) Miki Ito (伊藤 美紀)	Urawa Reds	6

== See also ==
- 2023 Empress's Cup
- 2023–24 WE League Cup
- 2023 AFC Women's Club Championship
- 2024–25 AFC Women's Champions League
