= Riko Urakawa =

Japanese association football player

Personal information
- Date of birth: 14 January 1998 (age 28)
- Place of birth: Osaka Prefecture, Japan
- Height: 1.80 m (5 ft 11 in)
- Position: Defender

Team information
- Current team: Albirex Niigata
- Number: 2

Senior career*
Years	Team	Apps	(Gls)
- Albirex Niigata
- * Club domestic league appearances and goals

Riko Urakawa (born 14 January 1998) is a Japanese professional footballer who plays as a defender for WE League club Albirex Niigata Ladies.

== Club career ==
Urakawa made her WE League debut on 12 September 2021.
