= Megumi Itō =

Megumi Itō may refer to:

- Megumi Itō (synchronized swimmer)
- Megumi Ito (footballer)
