= Nanami Kitamura =

Japanese footballer

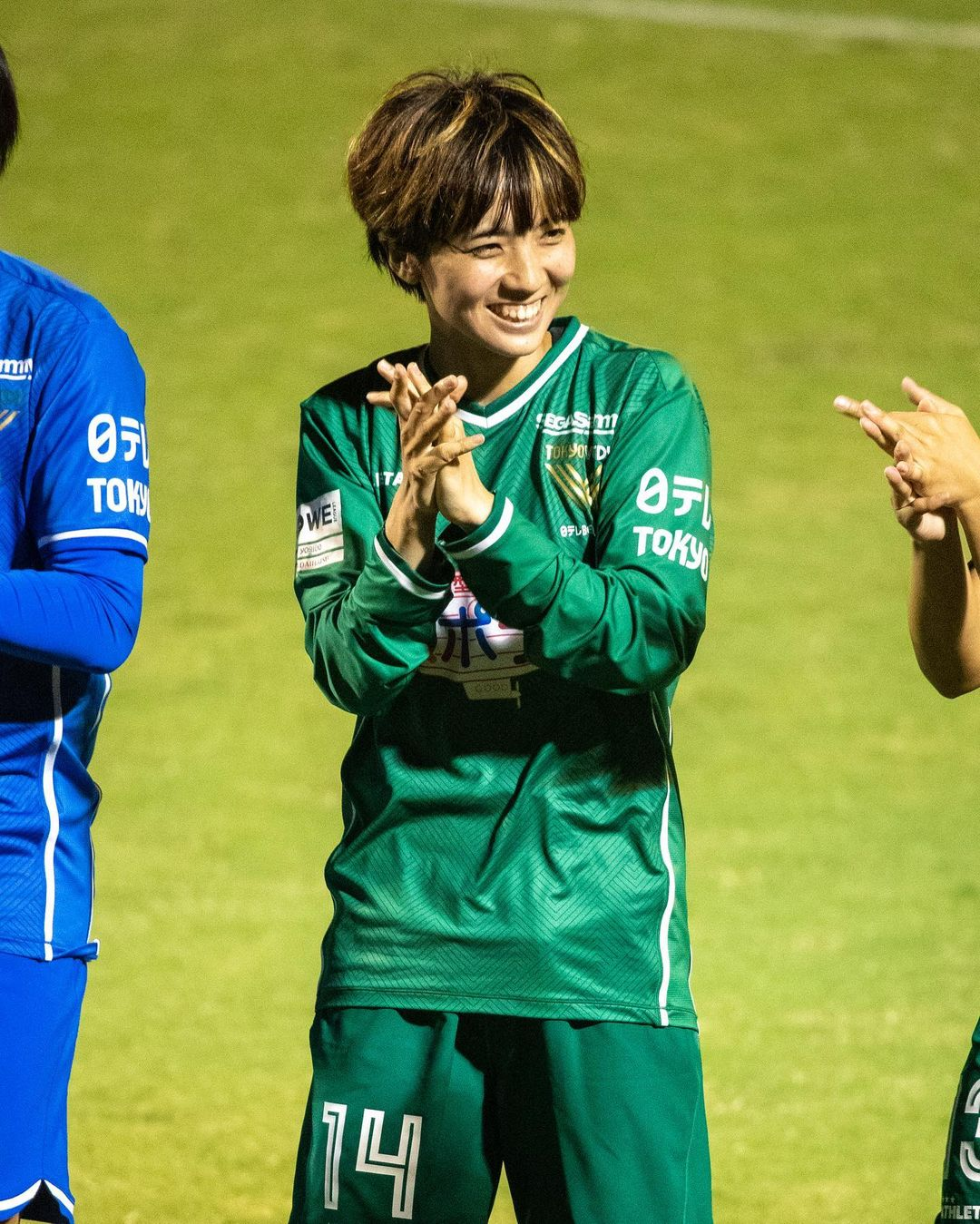

Personal information
- Date of birth: 25 November 1999 (age 26)
- Place of birth: Osaka, Japan
- Height: 1.61 m (5 ft 3 in)
- Position: Defender

Team information
- Current team: Tokyo Verdy Beleza
- Number: 14

Youth career
- Shokakuji FC

Senior career*
Years	Team	Apps	(Gls)
2014–2020	Cerezo Osaka Sakai	95	(14)
2021–	Tokyo Verdy Beleza	22	(6)

International career^{‡}
2016	Japan U17	5	(0)
2017	Japan U19	1	(0)
2018	Japan U20	6	(0)
2021–	Japan	8	(0)
- * Club domestic league appearances and goals as of 17:33, 19 March 2023 (UTC) ‡ National team caps and goals as of 16:01, 22 February 2023 (UTC)

Nanami Kitamura (北村 菜々美, Kitamura Nanami; born 25 November 1999) is a Japanese footballer currently playing as a defender in the Japanese WE League club Tokyo Verdy Beleza and the Japan women's national team.

== Career statistics ==
=== Club ===
As of match played 19 March 2023

Appearances and goals by club, season and competition
Club	Season	League			National Cup (Note: Empress's Cup)		League Cup (Note: Includes Nadeshiko League Cup, WE League Cup)		Total	
Club	Season	Division	Apps	Goals	Apps	Goals	Apps	Goals	Apps	Goals
Cerezo Osaka Sakai	2014	Nadeshiko Challenge	5	0	0	0	0	0	5	0
Cerezo Osaka Sakai	2015	Nadeshiko Challenge (West)	11	2	0	0	0	0	11	2
Cerezo Osaka Sakai	2016	Nadeshiko League Div. 2	12	2	1	0	9	1	22	3
Cerezo Osaka Sakai	2017	Nadeshiko League Div. 2	16	2	2	0	8	1	26	3
Cerezo Osaka Sakai	2018	Nadeshiko League	18	1	2	0	8	2	28	3
Cerezo Osaka Sakai	2019	Nadeshiko League Div. 2	16	3	2	1	4	0	22	4
Cerezo Osaka Sakai	2020	Nadeshiko League	17	4	3	0	0	0	20	4
Cerezo Osaka Sakai	Total		95	14	10	1	29	4	134	19
NTV Tokyo Verdy Beleza	2021–22	WE League	12	4	2	1	-		14	5
NTV Tokyo Verdy Beleza	2022–23	WE League	10	2	4	1	5	0	19	3
NTV Tokyo Verdy Beleza	Total		22	6	6	2	5	0	33	8
Career total			117	20	16	3	34	4	167	27

=== International ===
As of matches played 6 October 2022.

Appearances and goals by national team and year
National team	Year	Apps	Goals
Japan	2021	7	0
Japan	2022	1	0
Total		8	0

== Honours ==
Tokyo Verdy Beleza

- Empress's Cup: 2022
- WE League Cup runner-up: 2022–23

Japan U20

- AFC U-19 Women's Championship: 2017
- FIFA U-20 Women's World Cup: 2018
