= Tomoko Takahashi (footballer) =

Japanese footballer

Personal information
- Date of birth: 7 April 1997 (age 29)
- Place of birth: Niigata Prefecture, Japan
- Height: 1.66 m (5 ft 5 in)
- Position: Goalkeeper

Team information
- Current team: Albirex Niigata Ladies
- Number: 21

Senior career*
Years	Team	Apps	(Gls)
2021–	Albirex Niigata Ladies		
- * Club domestic league appearances and goals

Tomoko Takahashi (born 7 April 1997) is a Japanese professional footballer who plays as a goalkeeper for WE League club Albirex Niigata Ladies.

== Club career ==
Takahashi made her WE League debut on 17 October 2021.
