= Minami Ishida =

Japanese footballer

Personal information
- Date of birth: 14 May 1991 (age 35)
- Place of birth: Gotemba, Japan
- Height: 1.62 m (5 ft 4 in)
- Position: Defender

Team information
- Current team: Nojima Stella
- Number: 3

Senior career*
Years	Team	Apps	(Gls)
	Nojima Stella	2	(0)
- * Club domestic league appearances and goals

Minami Ishida (born 14 May 1991) is a Japanese professional footballer who plays as a defender for WE League club Nojima Stella Kanagawa Sagamihara.

== Club career ==
Ishida made her WE League debut on 26 September 2021.
