= 2023 AFC Women's Club Championship =

Tournament details
- Host countries: Thailand; Uzbekistan
- Dates: Group stage: 6–12 November 2023; Final: 10 May 2024
- Teams: 8 (from 8 associations)

Final positions
- Champions: Urawa Red Diamonds (1st title)
- Runners-up: Incheon Hyundai Steel Red Angels

Tournament statistics
- Matches played: 13
- Goals scored: 53 (4.08 per match)
- Top scorer: Kiko Seike (7 goals)

The 2023 AFC Women's Club Championship (also known as the AFC Women's Club Championship 2023 – Invitational Tournament) was the fourth and final edition of the AFC Women's Club Championship, organized by the Asian Football Confederation (AFC). Eight clubs from AFC member associations competed.

A final between the two group winners was planned, but was initially cancelled by the AFC in March 2024, only to be reintroduced in the following month, and was held on 10 May.

== Seeding ==
| Pot 1 | Pot 2 | Pot 3 | Pot 4 |
|---|---|---|---|
| (Japan) Urawa Red Diamonds (Australia) Sydney FC | (South Korea) Incheon Hyundai Steel Red Angels (Chinese Taipei) Hualien | (Thailand) Bangkok (H) (Uzbekistan) FC Nasaf (H) | (India) Gokulam Kerala (Iran) Bam Khatoon |

== Format ==
The tournament was held in two centralized venues, with 4 teams in 2 groups, in a round-robin format. The first-placed team in each group advanced to the finals.

== Teams ==
| Team | Qualifying method | App. (last) |
|---|---|---|
| (Australia) Sydney FC | 2022–23 A-League Women premiers | 1st |
| (Japan) Urawa Red Diamonds | 2022–23 WE League champions | 1st |
| (South Korea) Incheon Hyundai Steel Red Angels | 2022 WK League champions | 2nd (2019) |
| (Chinese Taipei) Hualien | 2022 Taiwan Mulan Football League champions | 1st |
| (Thailand) Bangkok | 2023 Thai Women's League champions | 1st |
| (India) Gokulam Kerala | 2022–23 Indian Women's League champions | 2nd (2021) |
| (Iran) Bam Khatoon | 2022–23 Kowsar Women Football League champions | 2nd (2022) |
| (Uzbekistan) FC Nasaf | 2022 Uzbekistan Women's League champions | 1st |

== Group stage ==
=== Group A ===
| Pos | Team | Pld | W | D | L | GF | GA | GD | Pts | Qualification |
|---|---|---|---|---|---|---|---|---|---|---|
| 1 | (Japan) Urawa Red Diamonds | 3 | 3 | 0 | 0 | 20 | 1 | +19 | 9 | Advance to final |
| 2 | (India) Gokulam Kerala | 3 | 1 | 1 | 1 | 5 | 12 | −7 | 4 | |
| 3 | (Thailand) Bangkok (H) | 3 | 1 | 0 | 2 | 6 | 10 | −4 | 3 | |
| 4 | (Chinese Taipei) Hualien | 3 | 0 | 1 | 2 | 1 | 9 | −8 | 1 | |

Source: AFC
(H) Hosts
6 November 2023
16:30 UTC+7

| Urawa Red Diamonds (Japan) | 8–0 | (India) Gokulam Kerala |
|---|---|---|
| Shibata 2'; Kurishima 16'; Shimada 38'; Ito 48', 82'; Nishio 83'; Seike 87'; Ando 90+2' | Report |

Chonburi Stadium, Chonburi
Attendance: 100
Referee: Yu Hong (China)
6 November 2023
20:30 UTC+7

| Hualien (Chinese Taipei) | 0–2 | (Thailand) Bangkok |
|---|---|---|
| | Report | Kwandarin 15'; Kanyanat 70' |

Chonburi Stadium, Chonburi
Attendance: 209
Referee: Lê Thị Lý (Vietnam)

9 November 2023
16:30 UTC+7

| Gokulam Kerala (India) | 1–1 | (Chinese Taipei) Hualien |
|---|---|---|
| Kumari 19' | Report | Lin Jing-xuan 42' |

Chonburi Stadium, Chonburi
Attendance: 147
Referee: Rebecca Durcau (Australia)
9 November 2023
20:30 UTC+7

| Bangkok (Thailand) | 1–6 | (Japan) Urawa Red Diamonds |
|---|---|---|
| Kanyanat 87' | Report | Seike 6', 84'; Ito 9', 36'; Ando 21'; Shimada 51' |

Chonburi Stadium, Chonburi
Attendance: 500
Referee: Mahnaz Zokaee (Iran)

12 November 2023
16:30 UTC+7

| Urawa Red Diamonds (Japan) | 6–0 | (Chinese Taipei) Hualien |
|---|---|---|
| Seike 5', 17', 67'; Takatsuka 7'; Shimada 45'; Endo 75' | Report |

Chonburi Stadium, Chonburi
12 November 2023
20:30 UTC+7

| Bangkok (Thailand) | 3–4 | (India) Gokulam Kerala |
|---|---|---|
| Ploychompoo 26'; Kanyanat 45+1', 49' | Report | Dabbaghi 45'; Appiah 47', 77', 80' |

Chonburi Stadium, Chonburi

=== Group B ===
| Pos | Team | Pld | W | D | L | GF | GA | GD | Pts | Qualification |
|---|---|---|---|---|---|---|---|---|---|---|
| 1 | (South Korea) Incheon Hyundai Steel Red Angels | 3 | 3 | 0 | 0 | 7 | 1 | +6 | 9 | Advance to final |
| 2 | (Australia) Sydney FC | 3 | 2 | 0 | 1 | 5 | 4 | +1 | 6 | |
| 3 | (Uzbekistan) FC Nasaf (H) | 3 | 0 | 1 | 2 | 3 | 6 | −3 | 1 | |
| 4 | (Iran) Bam Khatoon | 3 | 0 | 1 | 2 | 3 | 7 | −4 | 1 | |

Source: AFC
(H) Hosts
6 November 2023
15:00 UTC+5

| Sydney FC (Australia) | 3–0 | (Iran) Bam Khatoon |
|---|---|---|
| Worts 3', 59'; Keane 43' | Report |

JAR Stadium, Tashkent
Attendance: 50
Referee: Doumouh Al Bakkar (Lebanon)
6 November 2023
18:00 UTC+5

| Incheon Hyundai Steel Red Angels (South Korea) | 2–0 | (Uzbekistan) FC Nasaf |
|---|---|---|
| Namgung Ye-ji 39' (pen.); Adams 44' (o.g.) | Report |

Pakhtakor Stadium, Tashkent
Attendance: 115
Referee: Veronika Bernatskaya (Kyrgyzstan)

9 November 2023
15:00 UTC+5

| Bam Khatoon (Iran) | 1–2 | (South Korea) Incheon Hyundai Steel Red Angels |
|---|---|---|
| Zandi 61' | Report | Namgung Ye-ji 58'; Jang Chang 78' |

JAR Stadium, Tashkent
Attendance: 48
Referee: Asaka Koizumi (Japan)
9 November 2023
18:00 UTC+5

| FC Nasaf (Uzbekistan) | 1–2 | (Australia) Sydney FC |
|---|---|---|
| Kudratova 90' | Report | Worts 33', 57' |

Pakhtakor Stadium, Tashkent
Attendance: 85
Referee: Pansa Chaisanit (Thailand)

12 November 2023
15:00 UTC+5

| Sydney FC (Australia) | 0–3 | (South Korea) Incheon Hyundai Steel Red Angels |
|---|---|---|
| | Report | Nrehy 44'; Hong Hye-ji 54'; Kim Hye-ri 70' |

JAR Stadium, Tashkent
Referee: Rahmonova Dilshoda (Tajikistan)
12 November 2023
18:00 UTC+5

| FC Nasaf (Uzbekistan) | 2–2 | (Iran) Bam Khatoon |
|---|---|---|
| Karachik 26', 71' | Report | Khosravi 62'; Didar 90+4' |

Pakhtakor Stadium, Tashkent
Referee: Nuannid Donjangreed (Thailand)

== Final ==
10 May 2024
18:00 UTC+9

| Urawa Red Diamonds (Japan) | 2–1 | (South Korea) Incheon Hyundai Steel Red Angels |
|---|---|---|
| Seike 22'; Shimada 26' | Report | Lee So-hee 13' |

Urawa Komaba Stadium, Saitama
Attendance: 5,271
Referee: Dong Fangyu (China)

== Top goalscorers ==
| Rank | Player | Club | Goals |
|---|---|---|---|
| 1 | (Japan) Kiko Seike | (Japan) Urawa Red Diamonds | 7 |
| 2 | (Thailand) Kanyanat Chetthabutr | (Thailand) Bangkok | 4 |
| 2 | (Japan) Miki Ito | (Japan) Urawa Red Diamonds | 4 |
| 2 | (Japan) Mei Shimada | (Japan) Urawa Red Diamonds | 4 |
| 2 | (England) Fiona Worts | (Australia) Sydney FC | 4 |
| 6 | (Ghana) Veronica Appiah | (India) Gokulam Kerala | 3 |
| 7 | (Japan) Kozue Ando | (Japan) Urawa Red Diamonds | 2 |
| 7 | (Uzbekistan) Lyudmila Karachik | (Uzbekistan) FC Nasaf | 2 |
| 7 | (South Korea) Namgung Ye-ji | (South Korea) Incheon Hyundai Steel Red Angels | 2 |
| 10 | Multiple players | | 1 |

== See also ==
Continental Club Championship

- 2023 CAF Women's Champions League
- 2023 Copa Libertadores Femenina
- 2023 OFC Women's Champions League
- 2022–23 and 2023–24 UEFA Women's Champions League
- 2023–24 AFC Champions League

Regional Club Championship

- WAFF Women's Clubs Championship (Western Asia)
