= Hikari Hirata =

Japanese footballer

Personal information
- Date of birth: 25 May 1995 (age 31)
- Place of birth: Kasuya, Japan
- Height: 1.60 m (5 ft 3 in)
- Position: Forward

Team information
- Current team: Nojima Stella Kanagawa Sagamihara
- Number: 7

Senior career*
Years	Team	Apps	(Gls)
2019–	Nojima Stella Kanagawa Sagamihara		
- * Club domestic league appearances and goals

Hikari Hirata (born 25 May 1995) is a Japanese professional footballer who plays as a forward for WE League club Nojima Stella Kanagawa Sagamihara.

== Club career ==
Hirata made her WE League debut on 12 September 2021.
