= WE League Cup =

- Organiser(s): JFA; WE League
- Founded: 2022; 4 years ago
- Region: Asia (AFC)
- Teams: 12
- Current champions: 2025–26: Tokyo Verdy Beleza (1st title)
- Most championships: Sanfrecce Hiroshima (2 titles)
- Broadcaster(s): TV Tokyo; YouTube; FIFA+
- Website: Official website
- 2024–25 WE League Cup; Dates: 31 August – 29 December 2024

The WE League Cup (Japanese: WEリーグカップ) is a cup competition for women's football clubs in Japan.

== Results ==
Edition	Season	Winners	Score	Runners-up	Venue
1	2022–23	Urawa Red Diamonds Ladies	3–3 (PSO: 4–2)	Nippon TV Tokyo Verdy Beleza	Ajinomoto Field Nishigaoka
2	2023–24	Sanfrecce Hiroshima Regina	0–0 (PSO: 4–2)	Albirex Niigata Ladies	Kawasaki Todoroki Stadium
3	2024–25	Sanfrecce Hiroshima Regina	1–0	INAC Kobe Leonessa	Japan National Stadium
4	2025–26	Nippon TV Tokyo Verdy Beleza	2–2 (PSO: 3–1)	RB Omiya Ardija Women	Todoroki Athletics Stadium

== Records and statistics ==
=== Performances by club ===
Performances in the WE League Cup by club
Club	Winners	Runners-up	Years won	Years runners-up
Sanfrecce Hiroshima Regina	2	0	2023–24, 2024–25	
Nippon TV Tokyo Verdy Beleza	1	1	2025–26	2022–23
Urawa Red Diamonds Ladies	1	0	2022–23	
Albirex Niigata Ladies	0	1		2023–24
INAC Kobe Leonessa	0	1		2024–25
RB Omiya Ardija Women	0	1		2025–26

=== Top scorers by year ===
Year	Top scorer(s)	Club(s)	Goals
2022–23	(Japan) Riko Ueki	Tokyo Verdy Beleza	6
2023–24	(Japan) Ayaka Michigami	Albirex Niigata Ladies	4
2024–25	(Japan) Serika Takawa	Cerezo Osaka Yanmar Ladies	4
2025–26	(Japan) Rikako Kobayashi	Tokyo Verdy Beleza	6

== See also ==
- JFA
- WE League
- Empress's Cup (National Cup)
- Japanese association football league system
