= Risako Oga =

Japanese footballer

Risako Oga 大賀 理紗子
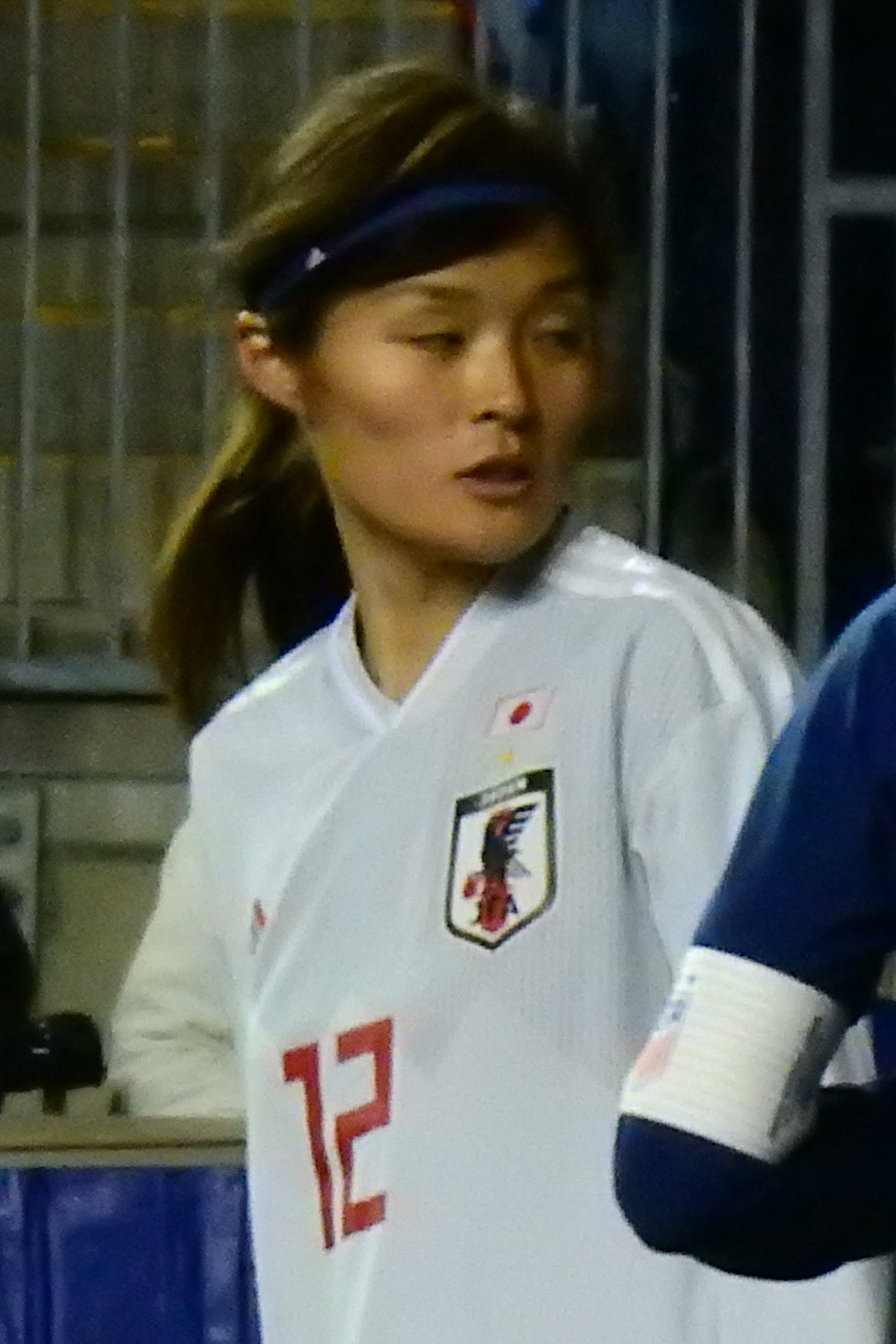
- Oga at the 2019 SheBelieves Cup

Personal information
- Full name: Risako Ōga
- Date of birth: January 4, 1997 (age 29)
- Place of birth: Yokohama, Japan
- Height: 1.69 m (5 ft 6 1/2 in)
- Position: Defender

Team information
- Current team: Nojima Stella
- Number: 5

Youth career
- 2012–2014: JEF United Chiba
- 2015–2018: Nittaidai SMG Yokohama

Senior career*
Years	Team	Apps	(Gls)
2019–	Nojima Stella	40	(4)

International career^{‡}
2019	Japan	3	(0)
- * Club domestic league appearances and goals as of 15:05, 15 February 2024 (UTC) ‡ National team caps and goals as of 15:05, 15 February 2024 (UTC)

Risako Oga (大賀 理紗子, Ōga Risako; born January 4, 1997) is a Japanese footballer who plays as a defender. She plays for Nojima Stella in the Nadeshiko Division 1 and for the Japan national team.

== Early life and club career ==
Oga was born in Yokohama on January 4, 1997. After graduating from Nippon Sport Science University, where she played for Nittaidai SMG Yokohama, she joined L.League club Nojima Stella Kanagawa Sagamihara in 2019.

== National team career ==
In February 2019, Oga was selected for the Japan national team for SheBelieves Cup. At this tournament, on February 27, she debuted against the United States.

== National team statistics ==
Japan national team
Year	Apps	Goals
2019	3	0
Total	3	0
