= Ruka Yamaya =

Japanese footballer

Personal information
- Date of birth: 10 February 1995 (age 31)
- Place of birth: Hokkaido Prefecture, Japan
- Height: 1.64 m (5 ft 5 in)
- Position: Midfielder

Team information
- Current team: Albirex Niigata Ladies
- Number: 20

Senior career*
Years	Team	Apps	(Gls)
2021–	Albirex Niigata Ladies		
- * Club domestic league appearances and goals

Ruka Yamaya (born 10 February 1995) is a Japanese professional footballer who plays as a midfielder for WE League club Albirex Niigata Ladies.

== Club career ==
Yamaya made her WE League debut on 12 September 2021.
