= Rana Okuma =

Japanese footballer

Personal information
- Date of birth: 23 December 1998 (age 27)
- Place of birth: Saitama Prefecture, Japan
- Height: 1.70 m (5 ft 7 in)
- Position: Forward

Team information
- Current team: VfL Bochum
- Number: 11

Senior career*
Years	Team	Apps	(Gls)
2017–2020	Urawa Red Diamonds	9	(0)
2021–2023	Omiya Ardija Ventus	22	(3)
2023–2025	CP Cacereño	34	(2)
2025–2026	Turbine Potsdam	18	(9)
2026–	VfL Bochum	1	(0)
- * Club domestic league appearances and goals

Rana Okuma (born 23 December 1998) is a Japanese professional footballer who plays as a forward.

== Club career ==
Okuma made her WE League debut on 12 September 2021.
