= Saori Takahashi =

Japanese volleyball player (born 1992)

Personal information
- Full name: Saori Takahashi
- Nickname: Saku
- Born: December 9, 1992 (age 33); Kitakami, Iwate, Japan
- Height: 1.77 m (5 ft 9 1/2 in)
- Weight: 68 kg (150 lb)
- Spike: 319 cm (126 in)
- Block: 310 cm (122 in)

Volleyball information
- Position: Wing Spiker
- Current club: Hitachi Rivale
- Number: 11

National team
Japan

Saori Takahashi (高橋 沙織 Takahashi Saori, born December 9, 1992) is a Japanese volleyball player who plays for Hitachi Rivale. She also plays for the All-Japan women's volleyball team.

Takahashi played for the All-Japan team for the first time at the Montreux Volley Masters in June 2013.

== Clubs ==
- (Japan) Waga-higashi Junior High
- (Japan) Morioka girls Highschool
- (Japan) Hitachi Rivale (2011-)

== Awards ==
=== Individuals ===
- 2013 - V.Challenge League Excellent player award

=== Clubs ===
- 2012-2013 V.Challenge League - Runner-Up, with Hitachi Rivale
