= Mayu Karahashi =

Japanese footballer

Personal information
- Date of birth: 4 August 1999 (age 27)
- Place of birth: Niigata Prefecture, Japan
- Height: 1.65 m (5 ft 5 in)
- Position: Midfielder

Team information
- Current team: Chifure AS Elfen Saitama
- Number: 27

Senior career*
Years	Team	Apps	(Gls)
	Chifure AS Elfen Saitama	1	(0)
- * Club domestic league appearances and goals

Mayu Karahashi (born 4 August 1999) is a Japanese professional footballer who plays as a midfielder for WE League club Chifure AS Elfen Saitama.

== Club career ==
Karahashi made her WE League debut on 20 September 2021.
