= Chise Takizawa =

Japanese association football player

Personal information
- Date of birth: 14 February 2001 (age 25)
- Place of birth: Okaya, Japan
- Height: 1.52 m (5 ft 0 in)
- Position: Midfielder

Team information
- Current team: Sanfrecce Hiroshima Regina
- Number: 10

Senior career*
| Years | Team | Apps | (Gls) |
| 2019–2021 | AC Nagano Parceiro | 10 | (3) |
| 2022– | Sanfrecce Hiroshima Regina | 2 | (1) |

International career^{‡}
| 2018 | Japan U17 | 5 | (0) |
| 2019 | Japan U19 | 3 | (0) |
- * Club domestic league appearances and goals as of 21:55, 23 November 2022 (UTC) ‡ National team caps and goals as of 21:55, 23 November 2022 (UTC)

Chise Takizawa (born 14 February 2001) is a Japanese professional footballer who plays as a midfielder for WE League club Sanfrecce Hiroshima Regina.

== Club career ==
Takizawa made her WE League debut on 12 September 2021.
