= Moemi Ishibuchi =

Japanese footballer

Personal information
- Date of birth: 20 April 1996 (age 30)
- Place of birth: Aichi Prefecture, Japan
- Height: 1.65 m (5 ft 5 in)
- Position: Forward

Team information
- Current team: Albirex Niigata
- Number: 8

Senior career*
Years	Team	Apps	(Gls)
2021-	Albirex Niigata	33	(3)
- * Club domestic league appearances and goals

Moemi Ishibuchi (born 20 April 1996) is a Japanese professional footballer who made her WE League debut on 20 September 2021 as a forward for Albirex Niigata.
