= Manaka Matsumoto =

Japanese footballer

Personal information
- Date of birth: 10 February 1999 (age 27)
- Place of birth: Yokohama, Japan
- Height: 1.64 m (5 ft 5 in)
- Position: Forward

Team information
- Current team: Sanfrecce Hiroshima Regina
- Number: 14

Senior career*
Years	Team	Apps	(Gls)
2021–2023	Nojima Stella		
2023–	Sanfrecce Hiroshima Regina		
- * Club domestic league appearances and goals

Manaka Matsumoto (born 10 February 1999) is a Japanese professional footballer who plays as a forward for WE League club Nojima Stella Kanagawa Sagamihara.

== Club career ==
Matsumoto made her WE League debut on 12 September 2021.
