= Rio Takizawa =

Japanese association football player

Personal information
- Date of birth: 30 September 1996 (age 30)
- Place of birth: Niigata Prefecture, Japan
- Height: 1.56 m (5 ft 1 in)
- Position: Midfielder

Team information
- Current team: 1. FSV Mainz 05
- Number: 8

Senior career*
Years	Team	Apps	(Gls)
2022-2023	AC Nagano Parceiro Ladies	20	(4)
2023-2026	SC Sand	77	(7)
2026–	1. FSV Mainz 05	8	(0)
- * Club domestic league appearances and goals as of 25 October 2026

Rio Takizawa (born 30 September 1996) is a Japanese professional footballer who plays as a midfielder for Frauen-Bundesliga club 1. FSV Mainz 05.

== Club career ==
Takizawa made her WE League debut on 12 September 2021.
