= Kozue Setoguchi =

Japanese footballer

Personal information
- Date of birth: 30 November 1991 (age 34)
- Place of birth: Kagoshima Prefecture, Japan
- Height: 1.54 m (5 ft 1 in)
- Position: Midfielder

Team information
- Current team: Chifure AS Elfen Saitama
- Number: 5

Senior career*
Years	Team	Apps	(Gls)
2021–	Chifure AS Elfen Saitama		
- * Club domestic league appearances and goals

Kozue Setoguchi (born 30 November 1991) is a Japanese professional footballer who plays as a midfielder for WE League club Chifure AS Elfen Saitama.

== Club career ==
Setoguchi made her WE League debut on 12 September 2021.
