= Minori Kishi =

Japanese footballer

Personal information
- Date of birth: 14 October 1994 (age 32)
- Place of birth: Higashikurume, Japan
- Height: 1.69 m (5 ft 7 in)
- Position: Defender

Team information
- Current team: Chifure AS Elfen Saitama
- Number: 20

Senior career*
Years	Team	Apps	(Gls)
2021–	Chifure AS Elfen Saitama	1	(0)
- * Club domestic league appearances and goals

Minori Kishi (born 14 October 1994) is a Japanese professional footballer who plays as a defender for WE League club Chifure AS Elfen Saitama.

== Club career ==
Kishi made her WE League debut on 12 September 2021.
