= Yo Tachibana =

Japanese footballer

Personal information
- Date of birth: 17 June 1997 (age 29)
- Place of birth: Aichi Prefecture, Japan
- Height: 1.56 m (5 ft 1 in)
- Position: Forward

Team information
- Current team: Sanfrecce Hiroshima Regina
- Number: 26

College career
Years	Team	Apps	(Gls)
2016	Florida State Seminoles	4	(0)
2017–2019	Central Connecticut Blue Devils	49	(6)

Senior career*
Years	Team	Apps	(Gls)
2021–	Sanfrecce Hiroshima Regina		

International career
2013	Japan U16		
2014	Japan U17		
- * Club domestic league appearances and goals

Yo Tachibana (born 17 June 1997) is a Japanese professional footballer who plays as a forward for WE League club Sanfrecce Hiroshima Regina.

== Club career ==
Tachibana made her WE League debut on 12 September 2021.
