= Rena Okutsu =

Japanese association football player

Personal information
- Date of birth: 12 May 1997 (age 29)
- Place of birth: Kanagawa Prefecture, Japan
- Height: 1.61 m (5 ft 3 in)
- Position: Defender

Team information
- Current team: AC Nagano Parceiro Ladies
- Number: 25

Senior career*
Years	Team	Apps	(Gls)
- AC Nagano Parceiro Ladies
- * Club domestic league appearances and goals

Rena Okutsu (born 12 May 1997) is a Japanese professional footballer who plays as a defender for WE League club AC Nagano Parceiro Ladies.

== Club career ==
Okutsu made her WE League debut on 2 October 2021.
