= Nojima Stella Kanagawa Sagamihara =

Nojima Stella Kanagawa Sagamihara ノジマステラ神奈川相模原
- Full name: Nojima Stella Kanagawa Sagamihara
- Nickname: Stella
- Founded: 2012
- Ground: Sagamihara Gion Stadium
- Capacity: 11,808
- Head coach: Masaaki Kanno
- League: WE League
- 2025–26: 7th
- Website: http://stellakanagawa.nojima.co.jp

Nojima Stella Kanagawa Sagamihara (ノジマステラ神奈川相模原) is a Japanese women's professional football club which plays in the WE League. Its hometown is Sagamihara, Kanagawa.

== History ==
In the 2016 season, Nojima Stella Kanagawa Sagamihara finished the first place in the 2016 L. League Division 2 and clinched the promotion to the Division 1 for the first time in the team history.

== Kits ==
=== Kit suppliers and shirt sponsors ===
Period	Kit manufacturer	Shirt sponsor (chest)	Shirt sponsor (sleeve)
2021–2022	X-girl	Television Kanagawa (TVK)	Epos Card
2022–2023	X-girl	Television Kanagawa (TVK)	Epos Card
2023–2024	X-girl	Television Kanagawa (TVK)	Epos Card

== Mascot ==
=== Lady Momo (Momo-chan) ===
- Birthday: March 3rd
- Hobbies: Supporting Stella's games!!
- Special Skill: Quickly peel banana skins
- Favorite food: Banana.
- Specialty dish: Sweets made with banana.

== Players ==
=== Current squad ===
As of 13 May 2023.

Note: Flags indicate national team as defined under FIFA eligibility rules; some limited exceptions apply. Players may hold more than one non-FIFA nationality.

No.	Pos.	Nation	Player
1	GK	JPN	Fubuki Kuno
2	DF	JPN	Yuka Hirano
3	DF	JPN	Minami Ishida
4	DF	JPN	Miyuka Hatanaka
5	DF	JPN	Risako Oga
6	MF	JPN	Arisa Matsubara
7	MF	JPN	Hikari Hirata
9	FW	JPN	Arisa Minamino
10	MF	JPN	Ami Sugita
14	MF	JPN	Hina Inoue
15	DF	JPN	Mako Kudo
16	GK	JPN	Nagisa Ikejiri

No.	Pos.	Nation	Player
18	DF	JPN	Sora Fukuzumi
19	MF	JPN	Chihiro Ishida
20	FW	JPN	Manaka Matsumoto
21	MF	JPN	Riko Shimoyama
22	DF	JPN	Juri Ito
23	FW	JPN	Haruka Hamada
24	MF	JPN	Mahiro Nishigori
25	FW	JPN	Rinko Ushikubo
26	DF	JPN	Ami Dekimura
27	MF	JPN	Kana Fujiwara
28	FW	JPN	Chinari Sasai
29	FW	JPN	Hana Saito
30	FW	JPN	Megu Hamada

== Club staff ==
Position	Name
Head coach	(Japan) Masaaki Kanno
Assistant head coach	(Japan) Kei Ezawa
Goalkeeper Coach	(Japan) Tomoya Ikeda
Chief trainer	(Japan) Ichiro Kumagai
Trainer	(Japan) Toru Mizoguchi
Competent	(Japan) Ayana Maehara
Academy director and Director of Avenir	(Japan) Aiko Fujimaki
Director Due	(Japan) Kohei Midorikawa
Academy Goalkeeper Coach	(Japan) Mami Isogami
Due Manager	(Japan) Yuho Tomoe
Avenile Manager	(Japan) Takuma Ito

== Honours ==
=== Domestic ===
- Nadeshiko League Division 2
  - Champions (1): 2016
- Empress's Cup
  - Runners-up (1): 2017

== Season-by-season record ==
Seasons of Nojima Stella Kanagawa Sagamihara
Season	Domestic League				Empress's Cup	Nadeshiko League Cup / WE League Cup
Season	League	Level	Position	Tms.	Empress's Cup	Nadeshiko League Cup / WE League Cup
2012	Kanagawa Div.3	6	Champions	Third round	—	
2013	Challenge League	2	4th	16	First round	—
2014	Challenge League	2	3rd	16	Third round	—
2015	Nadeshiko League Div.2	2	2nd	10	Third round	—
2016	Nadeshiko League Div.2	2	Champions	10	Quarter-finals	Semi-finals / Div.2
2017	Nadeshiko League Div.1	1	8th	10	Runners-up	Group stage
2018	Nadeshiko League Div.1	1	3rd	10	Quarter-finals	Group stage
2019	Nadeshiko League Div.1	1	7th	10	Quarter-finals	Group stage
2020	Nadeshiko League Div.1	1	8th	10	Quarter-finals	Cancelled
2021–22	WE League	1	10th	11	Fourth round	—
2022–23	WE League	1	9th	11	Quarter-finals	Group stage
2023–24	WE League	1	TBD	12	TBD	TBD

== Transition of team name ==
- Nojima Stella Kanagawa: 2012–2013
- Nojima Stella Kanagawa Sagamihara: 2014–present

== See also ==
- Japan Football Association (JFA)
- 2022–23 in Japanese football
- List of women's football clubs in Japan
