= Ayaka Inoue =

Japanese footballer

Personal information
- Date of birth: 15 January 1995 (age 31)
- Place of birth: Tochigi Prefecture, Japan
- Height: 1.62 m (5 ft 4 in)
- Position: Forward

Team information
- Current team: Omiya Ardija Ventus
- Number: 9

Senior career*
Years	Team	Apps	(Gls)
	Omiya Ardija Ventus		(5)

International career
2022–	Japan	3	(0)
- * Club domestic league appearances and goals

Ayaka Inoue (born 15 January 1995) is a Japanese professional footballer who plays as a forward for WE League club Omiya Ardija Ventus.

== Club career ==
Inoue made her WE League debut on 12 September 2021.

== Career statistics ==
=== International ===
National Team	Year	Apps	Goals
Japan
Japan	2022	3	0
Total		3	0
