= Miho Kamogawa =

Japanese footballer

Personal information
- Date of birth: 27 August 1997 (age 29)
- Place of birth: Ibaraki Prefecture, Japan
- Height: 1.56 m (5 ft 1 in)
- Position: Midfielder

Team information
- Current team: HJK
- Number: 71

Senior career*
Years	Team	Apps	(Gls)
2021–	JEF United Chiba	188	(25)
2025	→ Växjö (loan)	26	(3)
2026	→ HJK (loan)	24	(8)

International career
2013	Japan U16	4	(4)
2014	Japan U17	1	(0)
- * Club domestic league appearances and goals as of 17 Dec 2026

Miho Kamogawa (鴨川実歩, Kamogawa Miho; pronounced [kamo̞ɡa̠wa̠ miho̞]; born 27 August 1997) is a Japanese professional footballer who plays as a midfielder for Kansallinen Liiga club HJK.

== Club career ==
Kamogawa began her senior career with JEF United Chiba Ladies in the Japanese women’s league system. During her time at the club, she established herself as a technically skilled midfielder capable of contributing both defensively and offensively. She spent multiple seasons with the team and became an experienced player within the squad.

In 2025, Kamogawa moved to Sweden and joined Växjö DFF in the Damallsvenskan, the top tier of women’s football in Sweden. During the season, she recorded five goals and seven assists, adapting quickly to European football and earning recognition for her creativity and work rate in midfield.

In January 2026, HJK announced the signing of Kamogawa for the 2026 season. She joined the Finnish Kansallinen Liiga side as part of the club’s efforts to strengthen its midfield options and international experience. During the 2026 season, Miho Kamogawa won the Kansallinen Liiga assist ranking with 11 assists. She was also voted HJK Women’s Player of the Year in a vote conducted among the team’s players and coaching staff.She also helped HJK win the Kansallinen Liiga title and the Finnish Women’s Cup.
