= Mei Shimada =

Japanese footballer (born 2002)

Mei Shimada 島田 芽依
Personal information
- Date of birth: 8 May 2002 (age 24)
- Place of birth: Mitaka, Japan
- Height: 1.64 m (5 ft 5 in)
- Position: Forward

Team information
- Current team: Werder Bremen
- Number: 8

Senior career*
Years	Team	Apps	(Gls)
2022–2026	Urawa Reds	135	(51)
2026–	Werder Bremen	11	(4)

International career
2022	Japan U20	3	(0)
2023–	Japan	4	(0)
Medal record
Women's football
Representing Japan
Asian Games
Gold medal – first place	2023 Hangzhou	Team
FIFA U-20 Women's World Cup
Runner-up	2022 Costa Rica
- * Club domestic league appearances and goals as of 21 November 2026

Mei Shimada (島田 芽依, Shimida Mei; born 8 May 2002) is a Japanese professional footballer who plays as a forward for the Frauen-Bundesliga club Werder Bremen and the Japan national team. She is a gold medal winner for the 2022 Asian Games held in Hangzhou.

== Club career ==
After graduation from Fujimura Girls' High School, Shimawa was promoted from Urawa Reds' youth team to the senior team in 2021.

Shimada is a key player in the Urawa Reds, she plays as a target forward to bring her team into the attack. Since 2022, she played in 135 matches and scored 51 goals, and contributed significantly to the two WE League championship in season 2022–23 and season 2023–24. Sponichi described her as a "next generation heroine". Since Kiko Seike, a key player in the previous seasons, transferred to the Women's Super League club Brighton & Hove Albion, Shimada has to lead the front line of Urawa Reds.

Shimada is well regarded by sports analysts. For e.g., in a tactical analysis by Football Tribe, the analyst pointed out that Urawa Reds was losing tactically to Cerezo Osaka Yanmar Ladies' 3–1–4–2 formation, but Shimada's "excellence at receiving passes in crowded areas" helped them over come the team from Osaka. The club's manager also agreed that Shimada's off the ball movement created goal scoring chances for the team.

In 2023, British media AnalyticsFC selected her as one of the rising stars in Japan, writing that "Her decision making is often on-point and she is rarely seen to hesitate in a critical do-or-die situation...for expected goals, touches in the box, and open play defensive headers she is in the top 10% of the league."

In season 2025/2026, Shimada was the second highest goal scorer in the WE League, having scored 15 goals for the Urawa Reds, only one goal behind the top scorer.

On 3 July 2026, it was announced that Shimada had joined the Frauen-Bundesliga club Werder Bremen and is the first Japanese player to join this club. She settled at the club quickly, scoring 3 goals in her first six Bundesliga games.

== International career ==
In August 2022, Shimada was selected to the U20 Japanese national team and played in 3 matches in the 2022 FIFA U-20 Women's World Cup. They finished as runner up.

In August 2023, Shimada was selected into the Japanese national football team to play in the 2022 Asian Games held in Hangzhou, China. The games were actually played in 2023 due to delay caused by the COVID-19 pandemic. During the Asian games, Shimada played in four matches and contributed to Japan's gold medal.

In October 2026, Shimada was selected into the Nadeshiko Japan (usually known as the "A Team" of national football) to participate in friendlies against European teams. This is the first time Shimada entered the A Team.
