= Megumi Ito (footballer) =

Japanese association football player

Personal information
- Date of birth: 7 April 2002 (age 24)
- Place of birth: Nagano Prefecture, Japan
- Height: 1.50 m (4 ft 11 in)
- Position: Midfielder

Team information
- Current team: Sanfrecce Hiroshima Regina
- Number: 7

Senior career*
Years	Team	Apps	(Gls)
2021–2025	AC Nagano Parceiro Ladies		
2025–	Sanfrecce Hiroshima Regina		
- * Club domestic league appearances and goals

Megumi Ito (born 7 April 2002) is a Japanese professional footballer who plays as a midfielder for WE League club Sanfrecce Hiroshima Regina.

== Club career ==
Ito made her WE League debut on 12 September 2021.
