= Ayaka Michigami =

Japanese association football player

Personal information
- Date of birth: 27 July 1994 (age 32)
- Place of birth: Tokushima Prefecture, Japan
- Height: 1.69 m (5 ft 7 in)
- Position: Forward

Team information
- Current team: INAC Kobe Leonessa
- Number: 16

Senior career*
Years	Team	Apps	(Gls)
2021–2025	Albirex Niigata	8	(8)
- * Club domestic league appearances and goals as of 00:20, 19 July 2022 (UTC)

Ayaka Michigami (born 27 July 1994) is a Japanese professional footballer who plays as a forward for WE League club INAC Kobe Leonessa.

== Club career ==
Michigami made her WE League debut on 12 September 2021.
