= RB Omiya Ardija Women =

Japanese football club

RB Omiya Ardija Women RB大宮アルディージャWomen
- Nickname: Ventus
- Short name: RB Omiya W
- Founded: 1996; 30 years ago as Jūmonji Junior & Senior High School Soccer Team; 2025; 1 year ago as RB Omiya Ardija Women
- Ground: NACK5 Stadium Omiya; Niiza, Saitama, Japan
- Capacity: 15,500
- Owner: Red Bull GmbH
- Chairman: Masashi Mori
- Head coach: Rina Yanai
- League: WE League
- 2025–26: WE League, 11th of 12
- Website: https://www.rbomiya.com/women/

RB Omiya Ardija Women (RB 大宮アルディージャWOMEN), formerly Omiya Ardija Ventus (大宮アルディージャVentus) is a Japanese professional women's association football team which plays in the WE League.

== History ==
The team started in 1996 as an old girls' club for students of Jumonji Middle School in Toshima Ward, Tokyo. In 2014 they adopted the name "FC Jumonji Ventus" from the Latin word for wind and as a pun on Italian giants Juventus. In 2021 they merged with male club Omiya Ardija, across the prefectural border in Saitama, to participate in WE League.

On 6 November 2024, Omiya Ardija Ventus announced they would officially change their name to Red Bull Omiya Ardija Women from 2025, after being acquired by Red Bull GmbH.

== Kits ==
=== Kit suppliers and shirt sponsors ===
Period	Kit manufacturer	Shirt sponsor (chest)	Shirt sponsor (sleeve)
2021–2022	X-girl	NTT Docomo	Fujiyakuhin
2022–2023	X-girl	NTT Docomo	Fujiyakuhin

== Other sports ==
The Omiya Ardija Ventus's men's football team is the Omiya Ardija. The club plays in the J2 League, the second tier of football in the country.

== Staff ==
As of 17 September 2021.

Position	Name
General manager	(Japan) Norio Sasaki
Head coach	(Japan) Rina Yanai
Assistant coach	(Japan) Shinobu Ohno
Assistant coach	(Japan) Kei Shibayama
Goalkeeping coach	(Japan) Mizuki Nakae
Fitness coach	(Japan) Yoshiki Hirai

== Players ==
=== Current squad ===
As of 10 July 2026.

Note: Flags indicate national team as defined under FIFA eligibility rules; some limited exceptions apply. Players may hold more than one non-FIFA nationality.

No.	Pos.	Nation	Player
1	GK	JPN	Arisa Mochizuki
2	DF	JPN	Yuki Sakai
3	DF	JPN	Aya Sameshima
4	DF	JPN	Hikari Nagashima
5	DF	JPN	Ruka Norimatsu
6	DF	JPN	Saori Ariyoshi
7	MF	JPN	Marumi Yamazaki
9	FW	JPN	Ayaka Inoue
10	MF	JPN	Kyoka Goshima
11	FW	JPN	Miyuki Takahashi
13	MF	JPN	Ayu Nakada
14	FW	JPN	Rana Okuma
15	MF	JPN	Minori Hayashi

No.	Pos.	Nation	Player
16	FW	JPN	Eri Kitagawa
17	DF	JPN	Hinano Nishizawa
18	MF	JPN	Minori Tajima
22	GK	JPN	Minami Imamura
24	MF	JPN	Hazuki Genma
25	MF	JPN	Maho Murakami
26	DF	JPN	Mihoshi Sugisawa
28	DF	JPN	Fumina Shibayama
30	FW	JPN	Akane Yoshitani
31	DF	JPN	Hikaru Shibusawa
33	FW	JPN	Haruna Oshima
–	FW	PHI	Jaclyn Sawicki
–	FW	KOR	Park Eun-sun

== Season-by-season records ==
Seasons of Omiya Ardija Ventus
Season	Domestic League				Empress's Cup	WE League Cup
Season	League	Level	Position	Tms.	Empress's Cup	WE League Cup
2021–22	WE League	1	9th	11	Quarter-finals	—
2022–23	WE League	1	TBD	11	TBD	Group stage

Seasons of RB Omiya Ardija Women
Season	Domestic League				Empress's Cup	WE League Cup
Season	League	Level	Position	Tms.	Empress's Cup	WE League Cup
2025–26	WE League	1		12		—

== See also ==
- Japan Football Association (JFA)
- 2022–23 in Japanese football
- List of women's football clubs in Japan
