= Kumagaya Athletic Stadium =

Multi-use stadium in Japan

Coordinates: 36.164°N 139.411002°E

Kumagaya Athletics Stadium
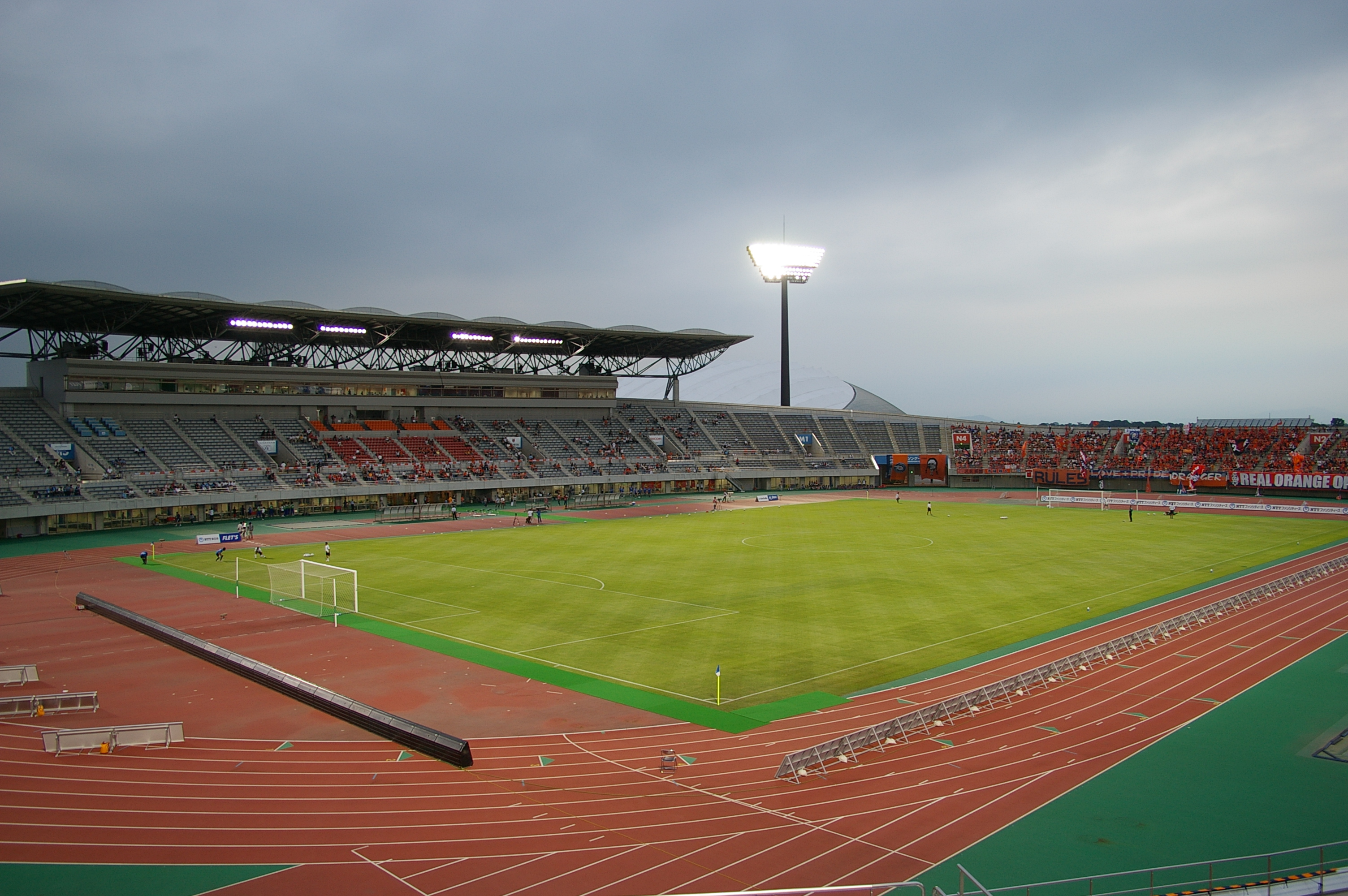

- Location within Saitama Prefecture Location within Japan
- Interactive map of Kumagaya Athletics Stadium
- Location: 300 Kamigawakami, Kumagaya, Saitama, Japan
- Owner: Saitama Prefecture
- Capacity: 15,392
- Surface: Grass

Construction
- Groundbreaking: 1996
- Opened: 2003

Tenants
- Chifure AS Elfen Saitama; Omiya Ardija

Kumagaya Athletics Stadium (熊谷スポーツ文化公園陸上競技場) is a multi-use stadium in Kumagaya, Saitama, Japan. The stadium is part of a larger sports complex which includes a smaller athletics stadium, a rugby stadium and a large arena. The complex is located in the Kumagaya Park.

== Uses ==
The Kumagaya Athletics Stadium itself includes a 9-lane athletic track and is one of the main tracks of the Japan Association of Athletics Federations, hosting athletics events through the year. The stadium is also the alternative stadium of the football team Omiya Ardija which plays some matches there. Some pre-season and Emperor's Cup matches are also played at the stadium.

The rugby stadium hosted matches during the 2019 Rugby World Cup.
