= Albirex Niigata Ladies =

Albirex Niigata Ladies アルビレックス新潟レディース
- Full name: Albirex Niigata Ladies
- Nicknames: Niigata L Albi Ladies
- Founded: 2002
- Ground: Niigata City Athletic Stadium
- Capacity: 18,671
- Chairman: Hideaki Yamamoto
- Manager: Daisuke Muramatsu
- League: WE League
- 2025–2026: WE League, 6th
- Website: https://www.albirex.co.jp/substructure/ladies.html
Home colours	Away colours

Albirex Niigata Ladies (Japanese: アルビレックス新潟レディース, romanized: Arubirekkusunīgata redīsu) is a professional women's football club based in Niigata and affiliated with Albirex Niigata, founded in 2002. The club currently plays in the WE League, the highest division of women's football in Japan.

== Kit suppliers and shirt sponsors ==
Period	Kit manufacturer	Shirt sponsor (chest)	Shirt sponsor (sleeve)
2021–2022	X-girl	Kameda Seika	None

== Honours ==
=== Domestic competitions ===
- Empress's Cup
  - Runners-up (4): 2011, 2013, 2015, 2016
- WE League Cup
  - Runners-up (1): 2023–24

== Season-by-season record ==
Seasons of Albirex Niigata Ladies
Season	Domestic League				Empress's Cup	WE League Cup
Season	League	Level	Place	Tms.	Empress's Cup	WE League Cup
2003	Hokushinetsu	3	Champions	9	Second round	—
2004	L2	2	2nd	6	Second round	—
2005	L2	2	2nd	7	Second round	—
2006	Nadeshiko Div.2	2	Champions	8	Second round	—
2007	Nadeshiko Div.1	1	6th	8	Quarter-finals	Group stage
2008	Nadeshiko Div.1	1	7th	8	Quarter-finals	—
2009	Nadeshiko Div.1	1	7th	8	Quarter-finals	—
2010	Nadeshiko	1	6th	10	Semi-finals	Group stage
2011	Nadeshiko	1	5th	9	Runners-up	—
2012	Nadeshiko	1	5th	10	Third round	Semi-finals
2013	Nadeshiko	1	8th	10	Runners-up	Group stage
2014	Nadeshiko Div.1	1	3rd	10	Quarter-finals	—
2015	Nadeshiko Div.1	1	4th	10	Runners-up	—
2016	Nadeshiko Div.1	1	5th	10	Runners-up	Group stage
2017	Nadeshiko Div.1	1	5th	10	Quarter-finals	Group stage
2018	Nadeshiko Div.1	1	5th	10	Quarter-finals	Group stage
2019	Nadeshiko Div.1	1	6th	10	Quarter-finals	Group stage
2020	Nadeshiko Div.1	1	5th	10	Semi-finals	Cancelled
2021–22	WE League	1	8th	11	Quarter-finals	—
2022–23	WE League	1	10th	11	Semi-finals	Group stage
2023–24	WE League	1	TBD	12	TBD	Runners-up

== See also ==
- List of women's football clubs in Japan
- 2022–23 in Japanese football
- Albirex Jurong Women's FC
