= 2021–22 WE League =

WE League
- Season: 2021–22
- Dates: 12 September 2021 – 21 May 2022
- Champions: INAC Kobe Leonessa; 1st WE League title 4th Japanese title
- Matches: 110
- Goals: 260 (2.36 per match)
- Top goalscorer: Yuika Sugasawa (Urawa Red Diamonds) (14 goals)
- Biggest home win: INAC Kobe Leonessa 5–0 Omiya Ardija Ventus (12 Sep)
- Biggest away win: Omiya Ardija Ventus 1–4 Urawa Red Diamonds (2 Oct)
- Highest scoring: Nojima Stella Kanagawa 2–4 Albirex Niigata (20 Nov) (6 goals)
- Longest winning run: 8 matches INAC Kobe Leonessa
- Longest unbeaten run: 9 matches INAC Kobe Leonessa
- Longest winless run: 10 matches Nojima Stella Kanagawa
- Longest losing run: 5 matches AS Elfen Saitama
- All statistics correct as of 22 May 2022.

The 2021–22 WE League, also known as the 2021–22 Yogibo WE League (Japanese: 2021–22 Yogibo WEリーグ, Hepburn: 2021–22 Yogibo WE Rīgu) for sponsorship reasons, was the 1st season of the WE League, the top Japanese women's professional league for association football clubs, since its establishment in 2020. The league began on 2 September 2021 and ended on 21 May 2022.

== Organisation ==
The WE League is Japan's first fully professional women's soccer league, and 2021–22 is the WE League's inaugural season.

== Competition ==
=== Preseason ===
Preseason ran from 24 April 2021 to 19 June 2021 prior to the Tokyo Olympics. In the first preseason match, INAC Kobe Leonessa defeated AC Nagano Parceiro 3–0.

=== Regular season ===
The regular season started on 12 September 2021 and finished on 21 May 2022.

== Clubs ==
=== Stadiums and locations ===
Club	Stadium	Capacity
MyNavi Sendai	Yurtec Stadium Sendai	19,694
MyNavi Sendai	Q&A Stadium Miyagi	49,133
Urawa Red Diamonds	Urawa Komaba Stadium	21,500
Omiya Ardija Ventus	NACK5 Stadium Omiya	15,500
AS Elfen Saitama	Kumagaya Athletic Stadium	15,392
JEF United Chiba	Fukuda Denshi Arena	19,781
JEF United Chiba	ZA Oripri Stadium	14,051
Tokyo Verdy Beleza	Ajinomoto Field Nishigaoka	7,258
Nojima Stella Kanagawa	Sagamihara Gion Stadium	15,300
AC Nagano Parceiro	Nagano U Stadium	15,491
Albirex Niigata	Denka Big Swan Stadium	42,300
Albirex Niigata	Niigata Athletic Stadium	18,671
INAC Kobe Leonessa	Noevir Stadium Kobe	30,132
Sanfrecce Hiroshima Regina	Hiroshima Koiki Park Football Stadium	6,000

Locations of WE League clubs
Locations of WE League clubs in and near Tokyo

=== Personnel and kits ===
Club	Manager	Captain	Kit manufacturer	Kit sponsor
MyNavi Sendai	(Japan) Takeo Matsuda	(Japan) Haruka Hamada	X-girl	Mynavi Corporation
Urawa Red Diamonds	(Japan) Naoki Kusunose	(Japan) Hanae Shibata	Nike	POLUS Co., Ltd.
Omiya Ardija Ventus	(Japan) Takeyuki Okamoto	(Japan) Saori Ariyoshi	X-girl	ahamo
AS Elfen Saitama	(Japan) Etsuko Handa	(Japan) Emi Yamamoto	X-girl	Chifure Holdings Co., Ltd.
JEF United Chiba	(Japan) Shinji Sarusawa	(Japan) Kanae Hayashi	X-girl	Yakult Honsha
Tokyo Verdy Beleza	(Japan) Kazuhiko Takemoto	(Japan) Risa Shimizu	ATHLETA	Task Force Co., Ltd.
Nojima Stella Kanagawa	(Japan) Makoto Kitano	(Japan) Arisa Matsubara	X-girl	Television Kanagawa
AC Nagano Parceiro	(Japan) Tadashi Ogasahara	(Japan) Kyoka Goshima	X-girl	Hokto
Albirex Niigata	(Japan) Daisuke Muramatsu		X-girl	Kameda Seika
INAC Kobe Leonessa	(Japan) Kei Hoshikawa	(Japan) Emi Nakajima	hummel	Earth Corporation
Sanfrecce Hiroshima Regina	(Japan) Shin Nakamura	(Japan) Yukari Kinga	Nike	EDION

== Foreign players ==
The JFA subsidizes salaries for players from Southeast Asian member federations, while the league itself subsidizes players from top-ranked FIFA countries.

Club	Player 1	Player 2	Player 3
MyNavi Sendai			
Urawa Red Diamonds			
Omiya Ardija Ventus	(United States) Grace Cutler		
AS Elfen Saitama	(Philippines) Sarina Bolden		
JEF United Chiba	(Philippines) Quinley Quezada	(Chinese Taipei) Cheng Ssu-yu	
Tokyo Verdy Beleza			
Nojima Stella Kanagawa	(Germany) Cindy König	(Nigeria) Uchechi Sunday	
AC Nagano Parceiro			
Albirex Niigata	(South Korea) Lee Hyo-kyeong		
INAC Kobe Leonessa	(Germany) Stina Johannes		
Sanfrecce Hiroshima Regina			

== League table ==
Pos	Team	Pld	W	D	L	GF	GA	GD	Pts	Qualification or relegation
1	INAC Kobe Leonessa	20	16	2	2	35	9	+26	50	League Winner
2	Urawa Red Diamonds	20	13	3	4	40	24	+16	42	
3	Tokyo Verdy Beleza	20	10	4	6	32	18	+14	34	
4	JEF United Chiba	20	9	7	4	26	18	+8	34	
5	Mynavi Sendai	20	9	4	7	25	16	+9	31	
6	Sanfrecce Hiroshima Regina	20	7	4	9	24	26	−2	25	
7	AC Nagano Parceiro	20	5	6	9	15	24	−9	21	
8	Albirex Niigata	20	4	7	9	20	30	−10	19	
9	Omiya Ardija Ventus	20	3	9	8	17	31	−14	18	
10	Nojima Stella Kanagawa	20	2	7	11	13	31	−18	13	
11	AS Elfen Saitama	20	2	7	11	13	33	−20	13	

Source: WE League, WE League Data Site
Rules for classification: 1) Points; 2) Goal difference; 3) Number of goals scored.

== Results ==
=== Positions by round ===
Team ╲ Round	1	2	3	4	5	6	7	8	9	10	11	12	13	14	15	16	17	18	19	20	21	22
INAC Kobe Leonessa	1	4	1	1	1	1	1	1	1	1		1	1	1	1	1	1	1	1	1	1	1
Urawa Red Diamonds	4	1	2	2	2	3	4	4	3	3		3	3	3	3	3	3	2	2	2	2	2
Tokyo Verdy Beleza	8	7	5	4	4	4	2	3	5	5		4	2	2	2	2	2	4	5	3	3	3
JEF United Chiba	7	6	10	10	10	7	5	5	4	4		5	5	5	5	4	4	3	3	4	4	4
MyNavi Sendai	5	3	4	3	3	2	3	2	2	2		2	4	4	4	5	5	5	4	5	5	5
Sanfrecce Hiroshima Regina	2	5	7	7	9	5	7	6	8	8		8	9	9	9	10	9	8	8	6	6	6
AC Nagano Parceiro	3	2	3	5	7	9	5	7	6	6		7	7	7	8	8	8	9	9	7	7	7
Albirex Niigata	9	8	6	6	5	8	9	10	10	9		9	8	8	7	7	7	7	7	9	8	8
Omiya Ardija Ventus	11	11	9	9	8	10	10	8	7	7		6	6	6	6	6	6	6	6	8	9	9
Nojima Stella Kanagawa	5	9	8	8	6	6	8	9	9	10		10	10	10	10	9	11	11	11	11	10	10
AS Elfen Saitama	10	10	11	11	11	11	11	11	11	11		11	11	11	11	11	10	10	10	10	11	11

Leader

Updated to match(es) played on 22 May 2022. Source: WE League (in English)

=== Results by round ===
Team ╲ Round	1	2	3	4	5	6	7	8	9	10	11	12	13	14	15	16	17	18	19	20	21	22
Albirex Niigata	L	D	W	D	WAD	L	L	L	L	W	L	WAD	D	D	W	L	W	L	L	D	D	D
MyNavi Sendai	D	W	D	W	D	W	WAD	W	L	D	L	W	WAD	L	W	L	L	W	W	L	L	W
AC Nagano Parceiro	W	D	D	L	L	L	W	L	W	WAD	W	L	D	WAD	L	D	L	L	D	W	D	L
INAC Kobe Leonessa	W	WAD	W	W	W	W	W	W	W	D	L	D	W	W	WAD	W	W	W	W	W	L	W
Sanfrecce Hiroshima Regina	W	L	L	D	L	W	D	WAD	L	D	W	L	L	L	L	WAD	W	W	L	W	D	W
Urawa Red Diamonds	W	W	WAD	W	W	L	L	L	W	D	W	W	D	W	W	L	WAD	W	W	W	W	D
Nojima Stella Kanagawa	D	L	D	WAD	W	L	D	L	L	L	L	D	D	L	L	W	L	WAD	D	L	D	L
Tokyo Verdy Beleza	L	D	W	W	L	W	W	L	WAD	D	W	W	W	W	W	L	L	L	WAD	D	W	D
JEF United Chiba	WAD	D	L	L	D	W	W	W	W	D	D	L	L	W	W	W	D	W	D	WAD	W	D
Omiya Ardija Ventus	L	D	D	L	W	WAD	L	W	D	D	D	D	L	D	L	W	D	L	L	L	WAD	L
AS Elfen Saitama	L	D	L	L	L	L	L	W	D	D	WAD	D	W	L	L	D	W	L	D	L	L	WAD

Win
Draw
Lose
WE ACTION DAY (WAD)

Updated to match(es) played on 22 May 2022. Source: WE League (in English)

=== All match results ===
Home \ Away	MYN	RED	VEN	ELF	JEF	BEL	STE	PAR	ALB	LEO	REG
MyNavi Sendai			0–0		1–1	1–0	0–0			1–1	4–0
Urawa Red Diamonds	3–1				2–0		2–0	2–0	2–0	0–2	1–2
Omiya Ardija Ventus	0–1	1–4		0–0			0–0	1–3	1–1		4–1
AS Elfen	0–3	1–1					1–1	1–0		0–1	0–3
JEF United Chiba		2–1	1–1	1–1		0–3	2–0	0–0			
Tokyo Verdy Beleza		1–2	0–0	4–1				4–0	2–0		2–0
Nojima Stella Kanagawa			0–1	1–0				0–0	2–4		
AC Nagano Parceiro					0–2	0–0				0–2	2–1
Albirex Niigata	0–3			2–1	0–1			1–3			
INAC Kobe Leonessa			5–0	1–1	2–0	1–0	1–0		1–0		3–2
Sanfrecce Hiroshima Regina	0–2				1–1		0–0		1–1		

Updated to match(es) played on 1 May 2022. Source: WE League (in English)
Legend: Blue = home team win; Yellow = draw; Red = away team win.

== Season statistics ==
As of 22 May 2022

=== Top scorers ===
Rank	Player	Club	Goals
1	(Japan) Yuika Sugasawa	Urawa Red Diamonds	14 (1 player)
2	(Japan) Mina Tanaka	INAC Kobe Leonessa	12 (1 player)
3	(Japan) Mami Ueno	Sanfrecce Hiroshima Regina	11 (1 player)
4	(Japan) Akari Shiraki	MyNavi Sendai	8 (2 players)
4	(Japan) Ayaka Michigami	Albirex Niigata	8 (2 players)
6	(Japan) Miyu Yakata	MyNavi Sendai	7 (1 player)
7	(Japan) Ayaka Inoue	Omiya Ardija Ventus	6 (6 players)
7	(Japan) Natsuki Kishikawa	JEF United Chiba	6 (6 players)
7	(Japan) Haruka Osawa	JEF United Chiba	6 (6 players)
7	(Japan) Remina Chiba	JEF United Chiba	6 (6 players)
7	(Japan) Riko Ueki	Tokyo Verdy Beleza	6 (6 players)
7	(Japan) Yui Narumiya	INAC Kobe Leonessa	6 (6 players)
(12 players)

== Pre-season matches ==
=== Overview ===
- Title: 2021 WE League pre-season matches
- Dates: 24 April – 19 June 2021
- Rules and regulations: match duration; 90 minutes (45 minutes each half)
- Number of matches: 22
- Official website: 2021 WE League pre-season matches (in Japanese)

=== Results ===
24 April 2021 Match 1	INAC Kobe Leonessa	3–0	AC Nagano Parceiro	Sakai, Osaka
13:00 UTC+9	Yui Narumiya 23', 41'; Fukina Mizuno 90+2'	Report (WE League) (in Japanese and English)		Stadium: Natural Grass Main Field S1; Attendance: 262; Referee: Haruna Kanematsu

24 April 2021 Match 2	Urawa Red Diamonds	1–1	MyNavi Sendai	Saitama, Saitama
14:00 UTC+9	Yuika Sugasawa 37' (pen.)	Report (WE League (in Japanese and English)	Hinata Miyazawa 72'	Stadium: Urawa Komaba Stadium; Attendance: 1,504; Referee: Asaka Koizumi

25 April 2021 Match 3	Albirex Niigata	6–0	Nojima Stella Kanagawa	Niigata, Niigata
14:00 UTC+9	Ayaka Michigami 34', 39'; Yuri Kawamura 45'; Yume Takikawa 66'; Fuka Kono 84', 90+2'	Report (WE League) (in Japanese and English)		Stadium: Denka Big Swan Stadium; Attendance: 678; Referee: Azusa Sugino

29 April 2021 Match 4	JEF United Chiba	0–1	Omiya Ardija Ventus	Ichihara, Chiba
13:00 UTC+9		Report (WE League) (in Japanese and English)	Yuki Sakai 45+2'	Stadium: ZA Oripri Stadium; Attendance: 362; Referee: Miu Sone

29 April 2021 Match 5	AC Nagano Parceiro	1–2	Albirex Niigata	Saku, Nagano
13:00 UTC+9	Hinako Murakami 73'	Report (WE League) (in Japanese and English)	Moemi Ishibuchi 3'; Natsuki Nagasawa 53'	Stadium: Saku Athletic Stadium; Attendance: 280; Referee: Kazue Kusadokoro

29 April 2021 Match 6	Nojima Stella Kanagawa	1–5	Urawa Red Diamonds	Sagamihara, Kanagawa
14:00 UTC+9	Minami Ishida 49'	Report (WE League) (in Japanese and English)	Yuika Sugasawa 2' (o.g.) 34', 69'; Yuzuho Shiokoshi 51', 67'	Stadium: Sagamihara Gion Stadium; Attendance: 485; Referee: Fusako Kajiyama

4 May 2021 Match 7	AS Elfen Saitama	0–1	INAC Kobe Leonessa	Kumagaya, Saitama
14:00 UTC+9		Report (WE League) (in Japanese and English)	Fukina Mizuno 4'	Stadium: Kumagaya Athletic Stadium; Attendance: 991; Referee: Emi Chiba

8 May 2021 Match 8	AC Nagano Parceiro	1–0	Nojima Stella Kanagawa	Saku, Nagano
13:00 UTC+9	Yukino Inamura 90+3'	Report (WE League) (in Japanese and English)		Stadium: Saku Athletic Stadium; Attendance: 277; Referee: Asaka Koizumi

8 May 2021 Match 9	Omiya Ardija Ventus	0–1	Sanfrecce Hiroshima Regina	Saitama, Saitama
14:00 UTC+9		Report (WE League) (in Japanese and English)	Mami Ueno 35'	Stadium: NACK5 Stadium Omiya; Attendance: 2,834; Referee: Yoshimi Yamashita

8 May 2021 Match 10	Tokyo Verdy Beleza	0–1	JEF United Chiba	Chōfu, Tokyo
14:00 UTC+9		Report (WE League) (in Japanese and English)	Yuka Anzai 8'	Stadium: AGF Field; Attendance: 0 (Behind closed doors); Referee: Haruna Kanematsu

9 May 2021 Match 11	MyNavi Sendai	0–0	AS Elfen Saitama	Kakuda, Miyagi
13:00 UTC+9		Report (WE League) (in Japanese and English)		Stadium: Kakuda athletic field Attendance: 478; Referee: Azusa Sugino

22 May 2021 Match 12	INAC Kobe Leonessa	2–0	Urawa Red Diamonds	Kobe, Hyōgo
13:00 UTC+9	Moriya Miyabi 48'; Maria Kikuchi 89'	Report (WE League) (in Japanese and English)		Stadium: Noevir Stadium Kobe; Attendance: 0 (Behind closed doors); Referee: Fusako Kajiyama

22 May 2021 Match 13	Sanfrecce Hiroshima Regina	2–0	JEF United Chiba	Hiroshima, Hiroshima
13:00 UTC+9	Chihiro Yamaguchi 50'; Konomi Taniguchi 72'	Report (WE League) (in Japanese and English)		Stadium: Hiroshima Koiki Park Football Stadium No.1; Attendance: 1,075; Referee: Saki Nakamoto

22 May 2021 Match 14	Omiya Ardija Ventus	0–4	Tokyo Verdy Beleza	Saitama, Saitama
14:00 UTC+9		Report (WE League) (in Japanese and English)	Riko Ueki 30', 84', 86'; Asato Miyagawa 67'	Stadium: NACK5 Stadium Omiya; Attendance: 2,856; Referee: Mariko Iwaki

22 May 2021 Match 15	Albirex Niigata	3–1	AS Elfen Saitama	Niigata, Niigata
14:00 UTC+9	Ayaka Michigami 27', 57'; Fuka Kono 59'	Report (WE League) (in Japanese and English)	Riko Yoshida 35'	Stadium: Denka Big Swan Stadium; Attendance: 586; Referee: Saori Takahashi

29 May 2021 Match 16	JEF United Chiba	1–2	MyNavi Sendai	Chiba, Chiba
12:00 UTC+9	Arisa Minamino 90+1'	Report (WE League) (in Japanese and English)	Akari Shiraki 22'; Miyu Yakata 32'	Stadium: Fukuda Denshi Arena; Attendance: 550; Referee: Minako Asakura

29 May 2021 Match 17	Nojima Stella Kanagawa	0–1	Omiya Ardija Ventus	Sagamihara, Kanagawa
13:00 UTC+9		Report (WE League) (in Japanese and English)	Ayaka Inoue 32'	Stadium: Sagamihara Gion Stadium; Attendance: 485; Referee: Haruna Kanematsu

29 May 2021 Match 18	Urawa Red Diamonds	2–2	Sanfrecce Hiroshima Regina	Saitama, Saitama
14:00 UTC+9	Mayu Sasaki 53'; Yuzuho Shiokoshi 55'	Report (WE League) (in Japanese and English)	Mami Ueno 14'; Yo Tachibana 84'	Stadium: Urawa Komaba Stadium; Attendance: 1,431; Referee: Junko Kirihara

30 May 2021 Match 19	Tokyo Verdy Beleza	4–0	Albirex Niigata	Kita, Tokyo
14:00 UTC+9	Nanami Kitamura 37', 57'; Rikako Kobayashi 42'; Risa Shimizu 65'	Report (WE League) (in Japanese and English)		Stadium: Ajinomoto Field Nishigaoka; Attendance: 1,888; Referee: Mari Miyazaki

5 June 2021 Match 20	MyNavi Sendai	2–1	Tokyo Verdy Beleza	Ishinomaki, Miyagi
13:00 UTC+9	Miyu Yakata 40'; Mayu Ikejiri 64'	Report (WE League) (in Japanese and English)	Jun Endo 77'	Stadium: Ishinomaki football field Attendance: 488; Referee: Azusa Sugino

5 June 2021 Match 21	Sanfrecce Hiroshima Regina	0–1	INAC Kobe Leonessa	Hiroshima, Hiroshima
14:00 UTC+9		Report (WE League) (in Japanese and English)	? 64' (o.g.)	Stadium: Hiroshima Koiki Park Football Stadium No.1; Attendance: 1,573; Referee: Michiko Fujita

19 June 2021 Match 22	AS Elfen Saitama	1–2	AC Nagano Parceiro	Kumagaya, Saitama
14:00 UTC+9	Emi Yamamoto 16'	Report (WE League) (in Japanese and English)	Shiho Tomari 50', 77'	Stadium: Kumagaya Athletic Stadium; Attendance: 701; Referee: Hisae Yoshizawa

== See also ==
National association

- Japan Football Association (JFA)

National league(s)

- Nadeshiko League

National cup(s)

- Empress's Cup
- Nadeshiko League Cup

National team(s)

- Japan women's national football team
