= Eriko Goya =

Japanese footballer

Personal information
- Date of birth: January 27, 1997 (age 29)
- Place of birth: Hyōgo, Japan
- Height: 1.65 m (5 ft 5 in)
- Position: Defender

Team information
- Current team: Sanfrecce Hiroshima Regina
- Number: 3

Youth career
- Osaka Tōin High School

Senior career*
Years	Team	Apps	(Gls)
2015–2018	Yoshikoku University	66	(4)
2019	Chifure	0	(0)
2019	→ Yunogo Belle (loan)	6	(0)
2020	Ehime	18	(0)
2021–	Sanfrecce Hiroshima Regina	5	(0)
- * Club domestic league appearances and goals as of 23 March 2023

Eriko Goya (Japanese: 呉屋絵理子) is a Japanese footballer who plays as a defender for Sanfrecce Hiroshima Regina in the WE League, the top flight of women's association football in Japan.

== Early life ==
Born in 1997, Goya grew up in Hyōgo prefecture. Her father was originally from Nishihara, Okinawa. She started playing soccer under the influence of her older brother, footballer Hiroto Goya, who has played for JEF Chiba in the J2 League. Goya attended Osaka Toin High School, and went to Yoshikoku University.

== Career ==
Goya played for the Yoshikoku University team, making 66 appearances in the league, scoring 4 goals. She also made 11 appearances in the cup, scoring no goals.

Goya joined Chifure, but went to Yunogo Belle on loan in 2019, making 6 appearances.

In 2020, Goya joined the Ehime FC Ladies, making 18 appearances during her first season playing in the 1st Division of the Nadeshiko League.

In 2021, Goya joined Sanfrecce Hiroshima Regina, but was unable to play at first due to a shoulder injury from the previous season. She underwent surgery in November 2021. On December 4, 2022, she made her debut with in the WE League against Tokyo Verdy Beleza, coming on in the 90th minute for Aoi Kizaki. On January 7, 2023, Goya was named to the starting lineup for Sanfrecce against AC Nagano Parceiro Ladies, which ended 0–0.

== Style of play ==
Goya mainly operates as a defender and can play as a centre-back.
