= Aoi Kizaki =

Japanese footballer

Aoi Kizaki 木﨑あおい
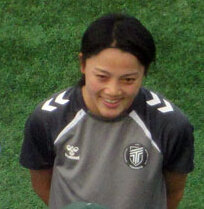
- Kizaki in 2025

Personal information
- Date of birth: 13 March 1998 (age 28)
- Place of birth: Saitama Prefecture, Japan
- Height: 1.61 m (5 ft 3 in)
- Positions: Defender; midfielder

Team information
- Current team: Stomilanki Olsztyn
- Number: 26

Youth career
- TS Girls
- Misugidai Together
- Hanno Bruder
- 2010–2015: Urawa Red Diamonds Ladies

Senior career*
Years	Team	Apps	(Gls)
2016–2018	Urawa Red Diamonds Ladies	24	(1)
2019–2020	Chifure AS Elfen Saitama	36	(3)
2021–2023	Sanfrecce Hiroshima Regina	27	(0)
2023–2024	Nippon TV Tokyo Verdy Beleza	15	(0)
2024	Sabah FA		
2025	AFC Toronto	14	(1)
2026–	Stomilanki Olsztyn	11	(0)

International career
2017	Japan U19	1	(0)
- * Club domestic league appearances and goals as of 20:46, 2 June 2026 (UTC)

Aoi Kizaki (木﨑あおい; born 13 March 1998) is a Japanese professional footballer who plays as a midfielder for I liga club Stomilanki Olsztyn.

== Early life ==
Kizaki began playing youth football with TS Girls, later joining Misugidai Together, Hanno Bruder, and then in 2010 joined the Urawa Red Diamonds Ladies.

== Club career ==
Ahead of the 2016 season, Kizaki was added to the senior roster of the Urawa Red Diamonds Ladies in the then first tier Nadeshiko League Division 1. In 2017, she was converted to a full-back role, from her usually defensive midfield role.

In January 2019, she joined Chifure AS Elfen Saitama in the then second tier Nadeshiko League Division 2.

In January 2021, she joined Sanfrecce Hiroshima Regina in the new first tier WE League, which was established as a professional league for 2021. Over her season and a half with the team, she played in every match.

In February 2023, Kizaki transferred to Nippon TV Tokyo Verdy Beleza in the WE League. In July 2024, it was announced that she would depart the club.

In September 2024, she signed with Malaysia National Women's League club Sabah FA.

In December 2024, Kizaki joined Canadian club AFC Toronto ahead of the inaugural Northern Super League season. On 11 May 2025, she scored her first goal in a 1–1 draw against Vancouver Rise FC.

On 4 February 2026, Kizaki moved to Polish Ekstraliga side Stomilanki Olsztyn on a free transfer.

== International career ==
In September 2017, Kizaki was called up to the Japan U19 ahead of a set of three friendlies. In April 2018, she was called up to the Japan U20 camp, as an injury replacement for Nanami Kitamura. In December 2020, she was called up to the Japan senior team for a training camp.

== Career statistics ==
As of match played 30 May 2026

Appearances and goals by club, season and competition
Club	Season	League			National cup (Note: Includes Empress's Cup, Polish Cup)		League cup (Note: Includes WE League Cup)		Other		Total	
Club	Season	Division	Apps	Goals	Apps	Goals	Apps	Goals	Apps	Goals	Apps	Goals
Urawa Red Diamonds Ladies	2016	Nadeshiko League Division 1	0	0	1	0	5	0	—		6	0
Urawa Red Diamonds Ladies	2017	Nadeshiko League Division 1	14	1	4	0	10	0	—		28	1
Urawa Red Diamonds Ladies	2018	Nadeshiko League Division 1	10	0	2	0	6	0	—		18	0
Urawa Red Diamonds Ladies	Total		24	1	7	0	21	0	0	0	52	1
Chifure AS Elfen Saitama	2019	Nadeshiko League Division 2	18	1	4	0	8	0	—		30	1
Chifure AS Elfen Saitama	2020	Nadeshiko League Division 2	18	2	2	0	—		—		20	2
Chifure AS Elfen Saitama	Total		36	3	6	0	8	0	0	0	50	3
Sanfrecce Hiroshima Regina	2021–22	WE League	20	0	2	0	—		—		22	0
Sanfrecce Hiroshima Regina	2022–23	WE League	7	0	2	0	4	0	—		13	0
Sanfrecce Hiroshima Regina	Total		27	0	4	0	4	0	0	0	35	0
Nippon TV Tokyo Verdy Beleza	2022–23	WE League	12	0	0	0	0	0	—		12	0
Nippon TV Tokyo Verdy Beleza	2023–24	WE League	3	0	2	0	2	0	—		7	0
Nippon TV Tokyo Verdy Beleza	Total		15	0	2	0	2	0	0	0	19	0
Sabah FA	2024	Malaysia National Women's League	0	0	0	0	—		3 (Note: Appearances in AFC Women's Champions League)	0	3	0
AFC Toronto	2025	Northern Super League	14	1	—		—		0	0	14	1
Stomilanki Olsztyn	2025–26	Ekstraliga	11	0	1	0	—		—		12	0
Career total			127	5	20	0	35	0	3	0	185	5
