= Hiroto Goya =

Japanese footballer (born 1994)

Hiroto Goya 呉屋 大翔
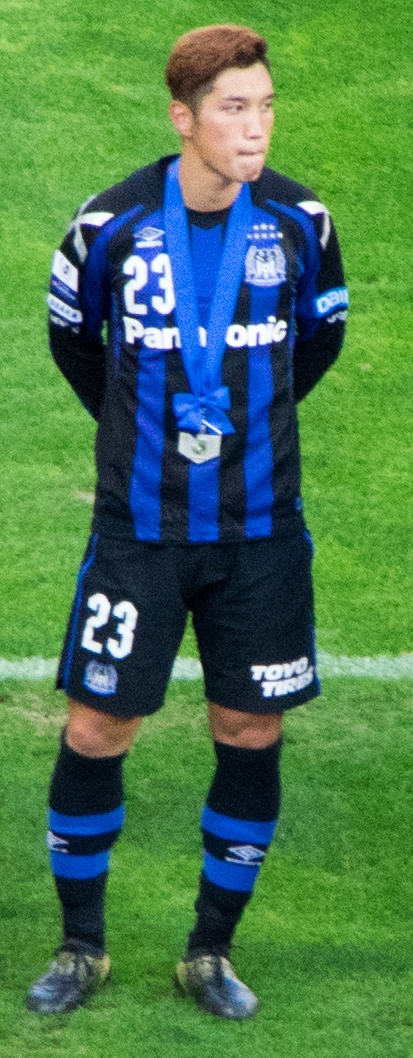

Personal information
- Full name: Hiroto Goya
- Date of birth: 2 January 1994 (age 32)
- Place of birth: Kawanishi, Hyōgo, Japan
- Height: 1.77 m (5 ft 10 in)
- Position: Forward

Team information
- Current team: JEF United Chiba
- Number: 9

Youth career
- –2005: Keyaki FC
- 2006–2008: Vissel Kobe
- 2009–2011: RKU Kashiwa High School

College career
Years	Team	Apps	(Gls)
2012–2015	Kwansei Gakuin University		

Senior career*
Years	Team	Apps	(Gls)
2016–2017	Gamba Osaka U-23	13	(7)
2016–2019	Gamba Osaka	23	(2)
2018	→ Tokushima Vortis (loan)	7	(1)
2019	→ V-Varen Nagasaki (loan)	36	(22)
2020–2021	Kashiwa Reysol	20	(4)
2021–2023	Oita Trinita	49	(9)
2023–	JEF United Chiba	100	(18)
Medal record
Gamba Osaka
Runner-up	J.League Cup	2016
- * Club domestic league appearances and goals as of 12 August 2026

Hiroto Goya (呉屋 大翔, Goya Hiroto) is a Japanese football player. He currently plays for JEF United Chiba.

He previously had a loan spell at fellow J2 League side Tokushima Vortis. His regular playing position is forward.

== Club career ==
After graduating from Kwansei Gakuin University, Goya signed for J1 League side Gamba Osaka ahead of the 2016 season and was handed the number 23 jersey. He made his J1 League debut as a second-half replacement for Shun Nagasawa in a 1–0 win away to Ventforet Kofu on 6 March 2016. He scored once in 14 league games during his first campaign at senior level with the goal coming against Albirex Niigata on 29 October. Goya also appeared once in both the Emperor's Cup and the AFC Champions League as well as scoring one goal in 4 substitute appearances in the J.League Cup. Unfortunately for him, he missed the decisive penalty in the final of the competition against Urawa Red Diamonds.

Although he found goals hard to come by for Gamba's top team in 2016, he had no such issues when playing for Gamba Under-23 in J3 where he found the back of the net 7 times in just 11 appearances. The following year Gamba's Under-23 side was run more as a youth team unlike the reserve team status it had held in 2016 and as such Goya only played twice and didn't manage to notch any goals in those limited appearances.

At senior level, 2017 was also a disappointment with his game time much less than in the previous season. He played just 9 times in J1 League, scoring once, a 92nd-minute equaliser in a 3–3 draw away to Urawa Red Diamonds. He also made one appearance in both the Emperor's Cup and the J.League Cup to take his senior total to just one goal in 11 appearances.

In search of more game time Goya was sent on loan to Tokushima Vortis for the 2018 season. However injury restricted him to just 7 games in which time he netted once before returning to Gamba for 2019.

== Personal life ==
As of 2023, his younger sister, Eriko Goya, plays as a defender for Sanfrecce Hiroshima Regina, in the women's top-flight WE League.

== Career statistics ==
Last update: 22 March 2019.

Club performance			League		Cup		League Cup		Continental		Other		Total	
Season	Club	League	Apps	Goals	Apps	Goals	Apps	Goals	Apps	Goals	Apps	Goals	Apps	Goals
Japan			League		Emperor's Cup		League Cup		Asia		Super Cup		Total	
2012	Kwansei Gakuin University	-	-		1	0	-		-		-		1	0
2013	Kwansei Gakuin University	-	-		1	1	-		-		-		1	1
2014	Kwansei Gakuin University	-	-		2	2	-		-		-		2	2
2015	Kwansei Gakuin University	-	-		1	0	-		-		-		1	0
Total			-		5	3	-		-		-		5	3
2016	Gamba Osaka	J1	14	1	1	0	4	1	1	0	0	0	20	2
2017	Gamba Osaka	J1	9	1	1	0	1	0	0	0	-		11	1
2019	Gamba Osaka	J1	0	0	0	0	1	0	-		-		1	0
Total			23	2	2	0	5	1	1	0	0	0	31	3
2018	Tokushima Vortis	J2	7	1	0	0	-		-		-		7	1
2019	V-Varen Nagasaki	J2	0	0	0	0	-		-		-		0	0
Career total			30	3	7	3	6	1	1	0	0	0	44	7

== Reserves performance ==
Last Update: 1 February 2019

Club performance			League		Total	
Season	Club	League	Apps	Goals	Apps	Goals
Japan			League		Total	
2016	Gamba Osaka U-23	J3	11	7	11	7
2017	Gamba Osaka U-23	J3	2	0	2	0
Career total			13	7	13	7
