= Naomi Yamamoto (footballer) =

Japanese footballer

Personal information
- Date of birth: 31 March 1991 (age 35)
- Place of birth: Yamanashi Prefecture, Japan
- Height: 1.68 m (5 ft 6 in)
- Position: Forward

Team information
- Current team: Chifure AS Elfen Saitama
- Number: 9

Senior career*
Years	Team	Apps	(Gls)
- Chifure AS Elfen Saitama
- * Club domestic league appearances and goals

Naomi Yamamoto (born 31 March 1991) is a Japanese professional footballer who plays as a forward for WE League club Chifure AS Elfen Saitama.

== Club career ==
Yamamoto made her WE League debut on 12 September 2021.
