= Chisato Ichinose =

Japanese footballer (born 1999)

Personal information
- Date of birth: 7 June 1999 (age 27)
- Place of birth: Chiba Prefecture, Japan
- Height: 1.67 m (5 ft 6 in)
- Position: Defender

Team information
- Current team: Sanfrecce Hiroshima Regina
- Number: 5

Senior career*
Years	Team	Apps	(Gls)
2018–2023	JEF United Chiba		
2023–	Sanfrecce Hiroshima Regina		
- * Club domestic league appearances and goals

Chisato Ichinose (born 7 June 1999) is a Japanese professional footballer who plays as a defender for WE League club Sanfrecce Hiroshima Regina.

== Club career ==
Ichinose made her WE League debut on 20 September 2021.
