= Funa Yanase =

Japanese footballer

Personal information
- Date of birth: 6 June 2002
- Place of birth: Aichi Prefecture, Japan
- Height: 1.53 m (5 ft 0 in)
- Position: Midfielder

Team information
- Current team: Sanfrecce Hiroshima Regina
- Number: 23

Youth career
- Nagoya FC Ladies
- FC Ferbol
- FC Ferbol MIMOSA
- Fujieda Junshin High School

Senior career*
Years	Team	Apps	(Gls)
2021–	Sanfrecce Hiroshima Regina		

International career
2026–	Japan		
Medal record
Representing Japan
Asian Games
Gold medal – first place	2026 Aichi-Nagoya	Women's football
- * Club domestic league appearances and goals

Funa Yanase (Japanese: 柳瀬 楓菜, born 6 June 2002) is a Japanese professional footballer who plays as a midfielder for Sanfrecce Hiroshima Regina in the WE League and the Japan national team. She won a gold medal with Japan at the 2026 Asian Games.

== Career ==
Yanase was born in Aichi Prefecture, Japan. She played youth football for Nagoya FC Ladies, FC Ferbol and FC Ferbol MIMOSA before attending Fujieda Junshin High School in Shizuoka Prefecture.

In January 2021, Yanase was announced as a new signing for Sanfrecce Hiroshima's women's team, which subsequently competed in the WE League as Sanfrecce Hiroshima Regina. She made her debut in the league during the 2021–22 season and became a regular member of the team's midfield. During the 2025–26 season, she scored five goals in 20 WE League appearances.

In July 2026, Yanase received her first call-up to the Japan senior women's national team for the women's football tournament at the 2026 Asian Games in Aichi-Nagoya. She started Japan's opening group-stage match and later returned to the starting line-up for the final against North Korea on 2 October. Yanase delivered the cut-back that led to Mami Ueno's opening goal in the 32nd minute. Japan drew 2–2 after extra time and won the penalty shoot-out 5–3 to secure its third consecutive Asian Games gold medal.
