= Kyoka Goshima =

Japanese association football player

Personal information
- Date of birth: 15 January 1997 (age 29)
- Place of birth: Oita Prefecture, Japan
- Height: 1.56 m (5 ft 1 in)
- Position: Defender

Team information
- Current team: AC Nagano Parceiro
- Number: 3

Senior career*
Years	Team	Apps	(Gls)
	AC Nagano Parceiro	5	(0)
- * Club domestic league appearances and goals

Kyoka Goshima (born 15 January 1997) is a Japanese professional footballer who plays as a defender for WE League club AC Nagano Parceiro.

== Club career ==
Goshima made her WE League debut on 12 September 2021.
