= Runa Konomi =

Japanese footballer

Runa Konomi 木稲瑠那
Personal information
- Date of birth: 6 August 2000 (age 26)
- Place of birth: Fukuoka Prefecture, Japan
- Height: 1.76 m (5 ft 9 in)
- Position: Goalkeeper

Team information
- Current team: Sanfrecce Hiroshima Regina
- Number: 1

Senior career*
Years	Team	Apps	(Gls)
2021–	Sanfrecce Hiroshima Regina	4	(0)
- * Club domestic league appearances and goals

Runa Konomi (木稲 瑠那, Konomi Runa; born 6 August 2000) is a Japanese professional footballer who plays as a goalkeeper for WE League club Sanfrecce Hiroshima Regina.

== Club career ==
Konomi made her WE League debut on 12 September 2021.
