= Nanami Sone =

Japanese footballer (born 1999)

Personal information
- Date of birth: 2 September 1999 (age 27)
- Place of birth: Chiba Prefecture, Japan
- Height: 1.59 m (5 ft 3 in)
- Position: Midfielder

Team information
- Current team: JEF United Chiba

Youth career
- Takasu Hoppers
- 2017–2018: JEF United Chiba

Senior career*
Years	Team	Apps	(Gls)
2018–2024	JEF United Chiba	45	(3)
2024	Young Elephants		
2024–2026	Abu Dhabi Country Club		
2026	Nees Atromitou	13	(1)
2026–	JEF United Chiba		
- * Club domestic league appearances and goals as of 18 July 2026

Nanami Sone (born 2 September 1999) is a Japanese professional footballer who plays as a midfielder for JEF United Chiba in the WE League.

== Club career ==
Sone made her WE League debut on 20 September 2021.
