= Tamaki Okuma =

Japanese footballer (born 2001)

Personal information
- Date of birth: 25 December 2001 (age 24)
- Place of birth: Chiba Prefecture, Japan
- Height: 1.69 m (5 ft 7 in)
- Position: Defender

Team information
- Current team: INAC Kobe Leonessa
- Number: 25

Senior career*
Years	Team	Apps	(Gls)
2019–2025	JEF United Chiba	5	(0)
- * Club domestic league appearances and goals

Tamaki Okuma (born 25 December 2001) is a Japanese professional footballer who plays as a defender for WE League club INAC Kobe Leonessa.

== Club career ==
Okuma made her WE League debut on 20 September 2021.
