= Namie Shimabukuro =

Japanese association football player

Personal information
- Date of birth: 10 June 1998 (age 28)
- Place of birth: Gunma Prefecture, Japan
- Height: 1.56 m (5 ft 1 in)
- Position: Forward

Team information
- Current team: Sanfrecce Hiroshima Regina
- Number: 20

Senior career*
Years	Team	Apps	(Gls)
2021–	Sanfrecce Hiroshima Regina		
- * Club domestic league appearances and goals

Namie Shimabukuro (born 10 June 1998) is a Japanese professional footballer who plays as a forward for WE League club Sanfrecce Hiroshima Regina.

== Club career ==
Shimabukuro made her WE League debut on 12 September 2021.
