= Chisa Okugawa =

Japanese footballer

Personal information
- Date of birth: 24 August 1995 (age 31)
- Place of birth: Aichi Prefecture, Japan
- Height: 1.59 m (5 ft 3 in)
- Position: Defender

Team information
- Current team: AC Nagano Parceiro Ladies
- Number: 22

Senior career*
Years	Team	Apps	(Gls)
2018-2022	MyNavi Sendai	40	(0)
2022-	AC Nagano Parceiro Ladies	19	(0)
- * Club domestic league appearances and goals

Chisa Okugawa (born 24 August 1995) is a Japanese professional footballer who plays as a defender for WE League club AC Nagano Parceiro Ladies.

== Club career ==
Okugawa made her WE League debut on 12 September 2021.
