= Sayaka Mitani =

Japanese association football player

Personal information
- Date of birth: 13 May 1995 (age 31)
- Place of birth: Okayama Prefecture, Japan
- Height: 1.61 m (5 ft 3 in)
- Position: Midfielder

Team information
- Current team: AC Nagano Parceiro Ladies
- Number: 11

Senior career*
Years	Team	Apps	(Gls)
- AC Nagano Parceiro Ladies
- * Club domestic league appearances and goals

Sayaka Mitani (born 13 May 1995) is a Japanese professional footballer who plays as a midfielder for WE League club AC Nagano Parceiro Ladies.

== Club career ==
Mitani made her WE League debut on 12 September 2021.
