= Arisa Minamino =

Japanese footballer (born 1991)

Personal information
- Date of birth: 26 November 1991 (age 34)
- Place of birth: Tokushima Prefecture, Japan
- Height: 1.57 m (5 ft 2 in)
- Position: Forward

Team information
- Current team: JEF United Chiba
- Number: 7

Senior career*
Years	Team	Apps	(Gls)
-2021	Nojima Stella		(7)
2021-	JEF United Chiba	5	
- * Club domestic league appearances and goals

Arisa Minamino (born 26 November 1991) is a Japanese professional footballer who plays as a forward for WE League club JEF United Chiba Ladies.

== Club career ==
Minamino made her WE League debut on 20 September 2021.
