= Hazuki (given name) =

Hazuki (Japanese: 葉月; "month of leaves") is the traditional name of the month of August in the Japanese calendar and a Japanese surname and given name. It can also refer to:

== People with given name ==
- Hazuki (singer) (葉月), vocalist for the band Lynch
- Hazuki (wrestler) (葉月; born 1997), Japanese wrestler
- Hazuki Genma (源間 葉月; born 1998), Japanese professional footballer
- Hazuki Miyamoto (宮本 葉月; born 2000), Japanese diver
- Hazuki Mukai (向井 葉月; born 1999), Japanese former member of idol group Nogizaka46
- Hazuki Nagai (永井 葉月; born 1994), Japanese field hockey player
- Hazuki Sakamoto (坂元 葉月; born 1998), Japanese former member of idol group Wasuta
- Hazuki Tanda (反田 葉月; born 2001), Japanese actress and voice actress
- Hazuki Watanabe (渡部 葉月; born 2004), Japanese artistic gymnast
- Hazuki Yuda (湯田 葉月; born 1989), Japanese field hockey player

== People with surname ==
- Ai Hazuki (葉月 あい; born 1995), Japanese actress
- Erino Hazuki (葉月 絵理乃), Japanese voice actress
- Hotaru Hazuki (葉月 螢 or 葉月 蛍; born 1970), Japanese actress
- Reo Hazuki (レオ葉月 or HZK; born 1997), a Japanese women's professional wrestler
- Riona Hazuki (葉月 里緒奈; born 1975), Japanese actress
- Yuna Hazuki (葉月 結菜; born 2002), Japanese member of idol group Iginari Tohoku San

== Fictional characters ==
- Iwao Hazuki (芭月 巌), the father of Ryo Hazuki in the video game series Shenmue
- Nagisa Hazuki (葉月 渚), a character from the anime Free!
- Ren Hazuki (葉月 恋), a character from the anime Love Live! Superstar!!
- Ryo Hazuki (芭月 涼), the protagonist of the video game series, Shenmue
- Shizuku Hazuki (葉月 しずく), a character from the manga New Game!
- Hazuki Shiina, a character in the anime and manga series Legend of Light
- Hazuki Fujiwara (藤原 はづき), a.k.a. Reanne Griffith, a character in Ojamajo Doremi
- Hazuki (葉月), a character from the anime Tsukuyomi -Moon Phase-
- Hazuki Azuma (東 葉月), a character from the anime and eroge Yami to Bōshi to Hon no Tabibito
- Hazuki Kashiwabara (柏原 葉月), a character from the visual novel 999: Nine Hours, Nine Persons, Nine Doors, whose code name was "Lotus"
- Hazuki Shimada (島田 葉月), a character from the Japanese light novel series Baka and Test
