= Yuna Sonoda =

Japanese association football player

Personal information
- Date of birth: 10 February 1999 (age 27)
- Place of birth: Miyazaki Prefecture, Japan
- Height: 1.56 m (5 ft 1 in)
- Position: Midfielder

Team information
- Current team: ADO Den Haag
- Number: 7

Senior career*
Years	Team	Apps	(Gls)
2020–2023	Albirex Niigata Ladies		
2023–2025	Chifure AS Elfen Saitama		
2026–	ADO Den Haag		
- * Club domestic league appearances and goals

Yuna Sonoda (born 10 February 1999) is a Japanese professional footballer who plays as a midfielder for WE League club Albirex Niigata Ladies. In the winter of 2025/26 she transfers to ADO Den Haag.

== Club career ==
Sonoda made her WE League debut on 12 September 2021.
