= Yuria Ito =

Japanese association football player

Personal information
- Date of birth: 2 April 2001 (age 25)
- Place of birth: Nagano Prefecture, Japan
- Height: 1.72 m (5 ft 8 in)
- Position: Goalkeeper

Team information
- Current team: Mynavi Sendai Ladies
- Number: 1

Senior career*
Years	Team	Apps	(Gls)
2020–2025	AC Nagano Parceiro Ladies		
- * Club domestic league appearances and goals

Yuria Ito (born 2 April 2001) is a Japanese professional footballer who plays as a goalkeeper for WE League club Mynavi Sendai Ladies.

== Club career ==
Ito made her WE League debut on 12 September 2021.
