= Hazuki Genma =

Japanese footballer

Personal information
- Date of birth: 28 October 1998 (age 28)
- Place of birth: Saitama Prefecture, Japan
- Height: 1.65 m (5 ft 5 in)
- Position: Midfielder

Team information
- Current team: JEF United Chiba
- Number: 23

Senior career*
Years	Team	Apps	(Gls)
2021–2024	Omiya Ardija Ventus		
2024–2025	AC Nagano Parceiro		
2025–	JEF United Chiba		
- * Club domestic league appearances and goals

Hazuki Genma (born 28 October 1998) is a Japanese professional footballer who plays as a midfielder for WE League club JEF United Chiba.

== Club career ==
Genma made her WE League debut on 12 September 2021.
