= Reina Shirowa =

Japanese footballer (born 2002)

Personal information
- Date of birth: 9 May 2002 (age 24)
- Place of birth: Chiba Prefecture, Japan
- Height: 1.74 m (5 ft 9 in)
- Position: Defender

Team information
- Current team: Albirex Niigata
- Number: 19

Senior career*
Years	Team	Apps	(Gls)
2021–2025	JEF United Chiba		
2025–	Albirex Niigata		
- * Club domestic league appearances and goals

Reina Shirowa (born 9 May 2002) is a Japanese professional footballer who plays as a defender for WE League club Albirex Niigata Ladies.

== Club career ==
Shirowa made her WE League debut on 20 September 2021.
