= Kusunose =

Kusunose (written: 楠瀬) is a Japanese surname. Notable people with the surname include:

- Akihito Kusunose (born 1986), Japanese football player
- Kusunose Yukihiko (1858–1927), general of the Imperial Japanese Army
- Naoki Kusunose (born 1964), Japanese football manager
- Shiho Kusunose (楠瀬 志保, born 1969), Japanese speed skater
- Tsunei Kusunose (1899–1988), Japanese politician
