= Momoko Sayama =

Japanese association football player

Personal information
- Date of birth: 19 February 1992 (age 34)
- Place of birth: Hiroshima Prefecture, Japan
- Height: 1.67 m (5 ft 6 in)
- Position: Defender

Team information
- Current team: Sanfrecce Hiroshima Regina
- Number: 6

Senior career*
Years	Team	Apps	(Gls)
2021–	Sanfrecce Hiroshima Regina		
- * Club domestic league appearances and goals

Momoko Sayama (born 19 February 1992) is a Japanese professional footballer who plays as a defender for WE League club Sanfrecce Hiroshima Regina.

== Club career ==
Sayama made her WE League debut on 18 September 2021.
