= Shiori Kinoshita =

Japanese footballer

Personal information
- Date of birth: 17 August 1992 (age 34)
- Place of birth: Kanagawa Prefecture, Japan,
- Height: 1.66 m (5 ft 5 in)
- Position: Defender

Team information
- Current team: Elfen Saitama
- Number: 2

Senior career*
Years	Team	Apps	(Gls)
	Elfen Saitama	2	(0)
- * Club domestic league appearances and goals

Shiori Kinoshita (born 17 August 1992) is a Japanese professional footballer who plays as a defender for WE League club Chifure AS Elfen Saitama.

== Club career ==
Kinoshita made her WE League debut on 12 September 2021.
