= Ai Ogawa =

Japanese footballer

Personal information
- Date of birth: 23 September 1998 (age 28)
- Place of birth: Tokyo Prefecture, Japan
- Height: 1.61 m (5 ft 3 in)
- Position: Midfielder

Team information
- Current team: Sanfrecce Hiroshima Regina
- Number: 8

Senior career*
Years	Team	Apps	(Gls)
2021–	Sanfrecce Hiroshima Regina		
- * Club domestic league appearances and goals

Ai Ogawa (born 23 September 1998) is a Japanese professional footballer who plays as a midfielder for WE League club Sanfrecce Hiroshima Regina.

== Club career ==
Ogawa made her WE League debut on 12 September 2021.
