= Yuka Anzai =

Japanese footballer (born 1996)

Personal information
- Date of birth: 14 October 1996 (age 30)
- Place of birth: Chiba Prefecture, Japan
- Position: Midfielder

Team information
- Current team: JEF United Chiba Ladies
- Number: 18

Senior career*
Years	Team	Apps	(Gls)
- JEF United Chiba Ladies
- * Club domestic league appearances and goals

Yuka Anzai (born 14 October 1996) is a Japanese professional footballer who plays as a midfielder for WE League club JEF United Chiba Ladies.

== Club career ==
Anzai made her WE League debut on 16 October 2021.
