= Akari Matsukubo =

Japanese footballer (born 1996)

Personal information
- Date of birth: 25 August 1996 (age 30)
- Place of birth: Kawasaki, Kanagawa Prefecture, Japan
- Height: 1.64 m (5 ft 5 in)
- Position: Defender

Team information
- Current team: Chifure AS Elfen Saitama
- Number: 3

Youth career
- NTV Menina

Senior career*
Years	Team	Apps	(Gls)
2015-2017	Chifure AS Elfen Saitama		
2018-2020	Iga FC Kunoichi Mie		
2021-	Chifure AS Elfen Saitama		
- * Club domestic league appearances and goals as of 4 24 2022

Akari Matsukubo (born 25 August 1996) is a Japanese professional footballer who plays as a defender for WE League club Chifure AS Elfen Saitama.

== Club career ==
Matsukubo made her WE League debut on 12 September 2021.
