= Yakult =

Sweetened probiotic milk beverage

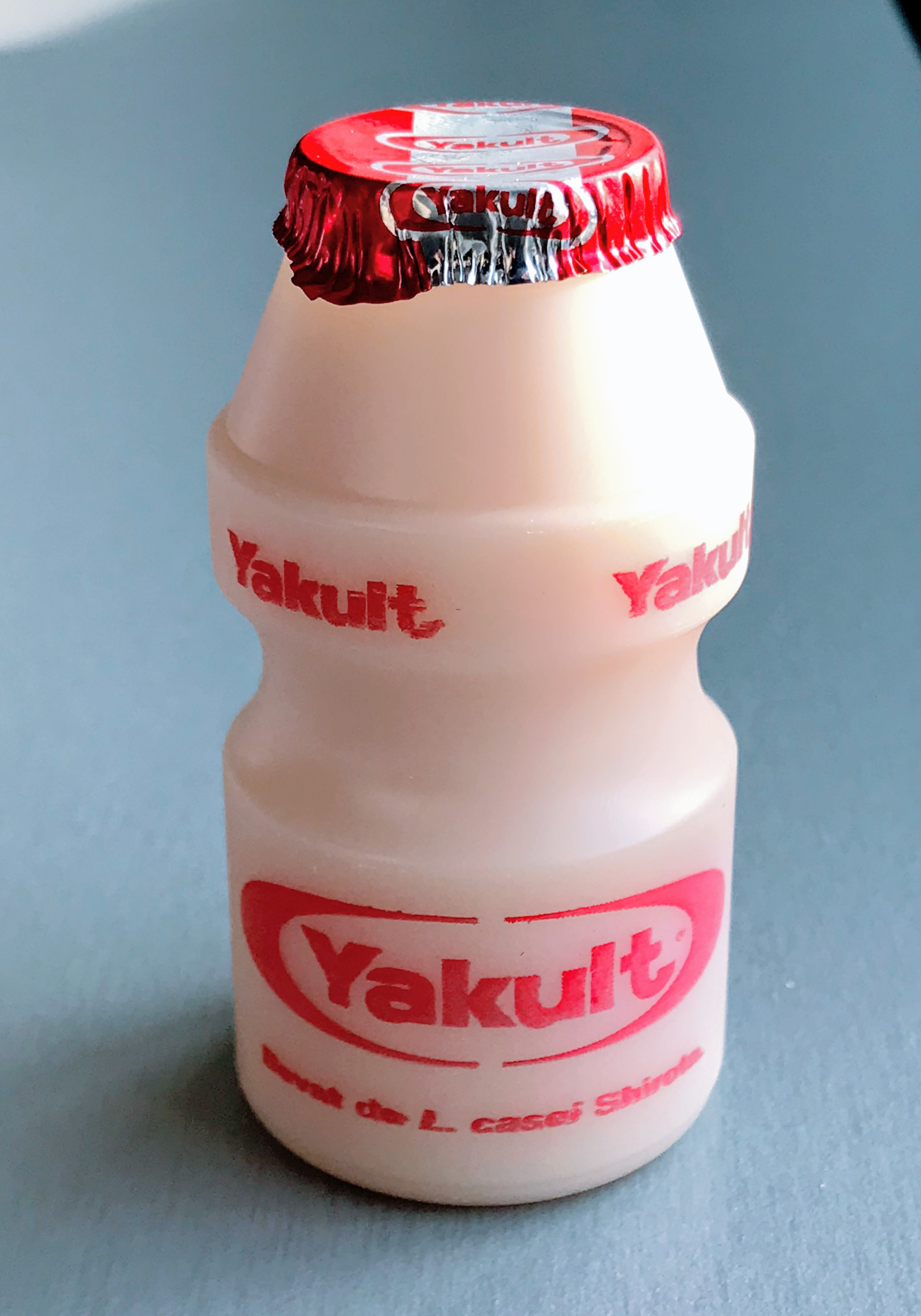
- A single serving of Yakult
- Type: Drink
- Manufacturer: Yakult Honsha
- Distributor: Yakult Honsha
- Origin: Japan
- Introduced: 1935
- Colour: Light peach
- Ingredients: Water, skimmed milk, glucose-fructose syrup, sucrose, citrus, live Lacticaseibacillus casei Shirota
- Website: www.yakult.nl

Yakult (ヤクルト, Yakuruto) is a Japanese sweetened probiotic milk beverage fermented with the bacteria strain Lacticaseibacillus casei Shirota. It is sold by Yakult Honsha, based in Tokyo. The name "Yakult" was coined from jahurto, an Esperanto word meaning "yogurt".

== Ingredients ==
Yakult's ingredients are water, skimmed milk, glucose-fructose syrup, sucrose, natural flavors (citrus), and live Lacticaseibacillus casei Shirota bacteria. The strain was originally classified as Lactobacillus casei.

Yakult is prepared by adding glucose to skimmed milk and heating the mixture at 90 to 95 °C for about 30 minutes. After letting it cool to 45 °C, the mixture is inoculated with the Lactobacillus and incubated for 6 to 7 days at 37 to 38 °C. After fermentation, water, sugar, gums, and lactic acid are added.

It is produced with various flavors. In Singapore, it was sold in orange, grape, apple, and original flavors from 1980 to 2026. However, from July 2026, the orange flavor was discontinued and replaced with peach due to production capacity constraints. The muscat flavor is produced in Mexico and China, while the mango flavor is sold in Indonesia and India.

== Health claims ==
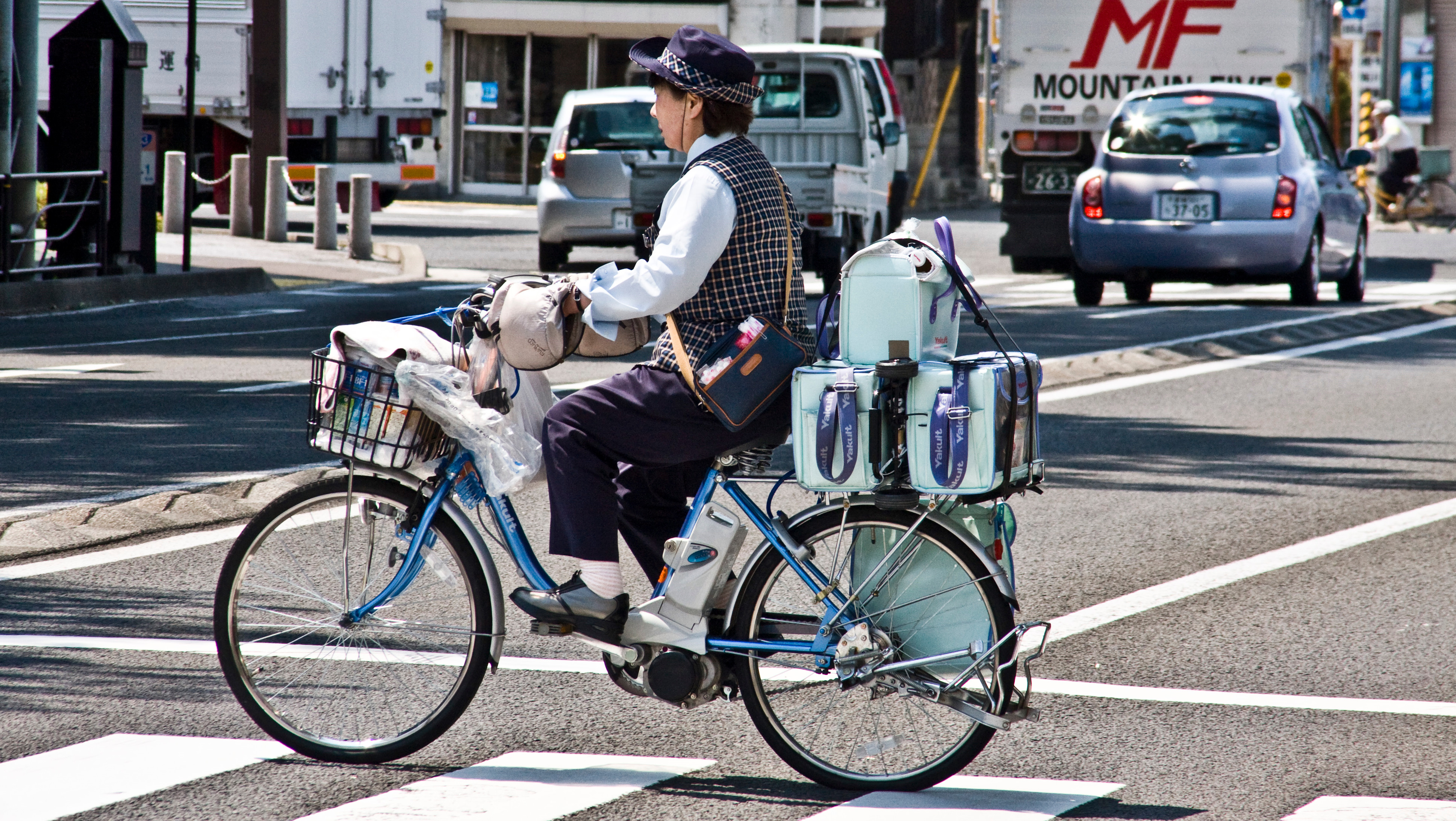
Delivery of Yakult drinks on a Yakult-branded bicycle in Fukushima City, Japan, 2009

In 2006, a panel appointed by the Netherlands Nutrition Center (Voedingscentrum) to evaluate a marketing request by Yakult found sufficient evidence to justify claims that drinking at least one bottle of Yakult per day might help improve bowel movements for people who tend to be constipated and might help maintain a healthy population of gut flora. However, these claims are not approved as health claims under EU regulations, which require authorization by the European Food Safety Authority (EFSA). The Netherlands Nutrition Center does not endorse specific probiotic products like Yakult, as only one probiotic health claim is authorized in the EU: that live bacteria in yogurt or fermented milk improve lactose digestion in individuals with lactose maldigestion. This claim is exclusive to yogurt and fermented milk containing specific strains (Lactobacillus delbrueckii subsp. bulgaricus and Streptococcus thermophilus). EFSA has rejected most probiotic health claims, including those for strains not in yogurt or fermented milk.

In 2010, an EFSA panel decided that the company was not allowed to make the health claim that the product defends the upper respiratory tract against pathogens (and thus protects against diseases like the common cold), finding that this was not supported by evidence.

In 2013, the UK Advertising Standards Authority disallowed an advertisement for Yakult in response to a complaint. It found that while there was sufficient evidence for the claim that "significant numbers of viable [Lactobacillus] survived transit to the gut [after consumption of Yakult]", the advertisement had made claims of general health benefits without providing a specific, referenced claim, as required.

== Marketing history ==
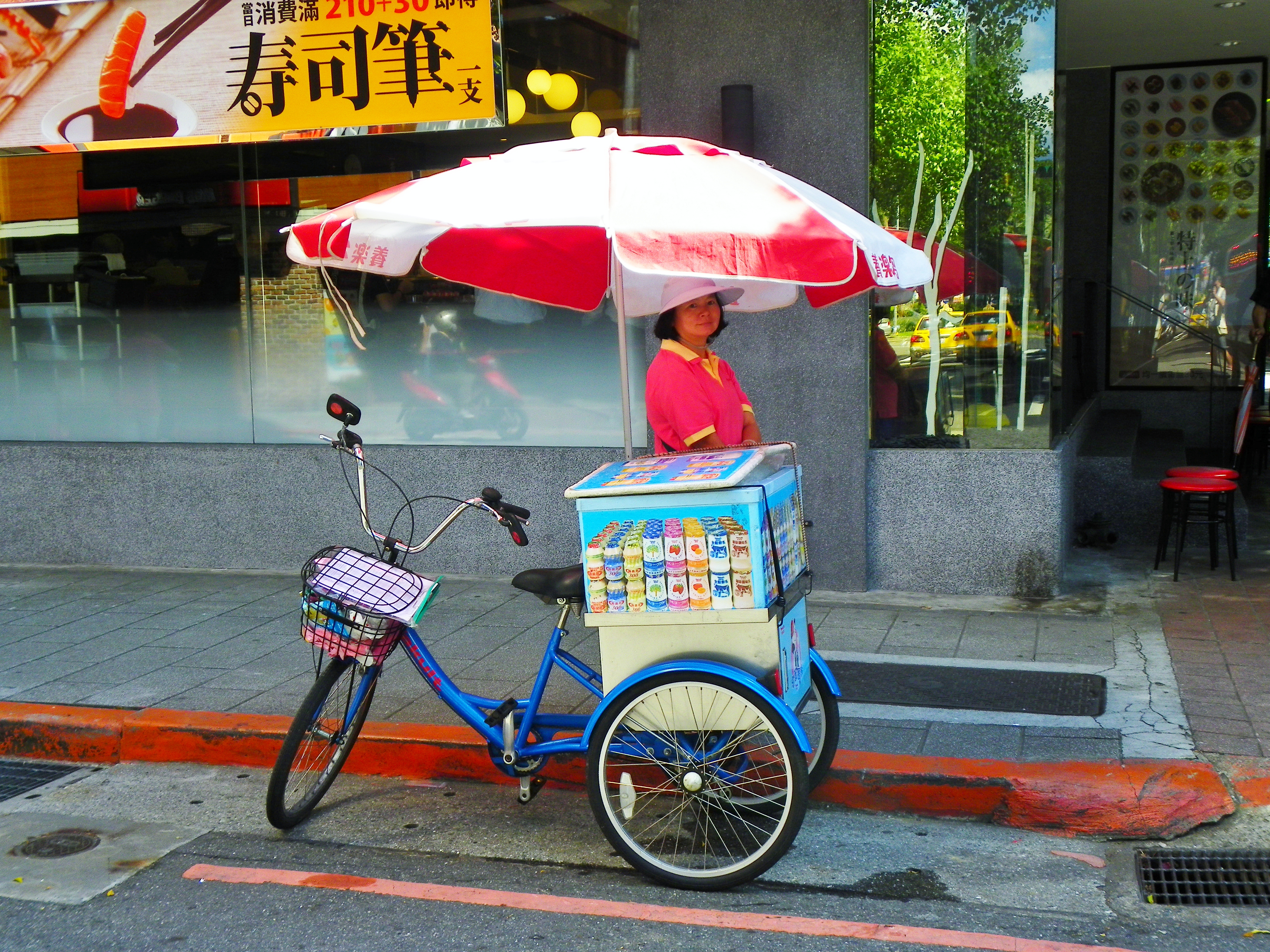
Yakult lady in Taiwan

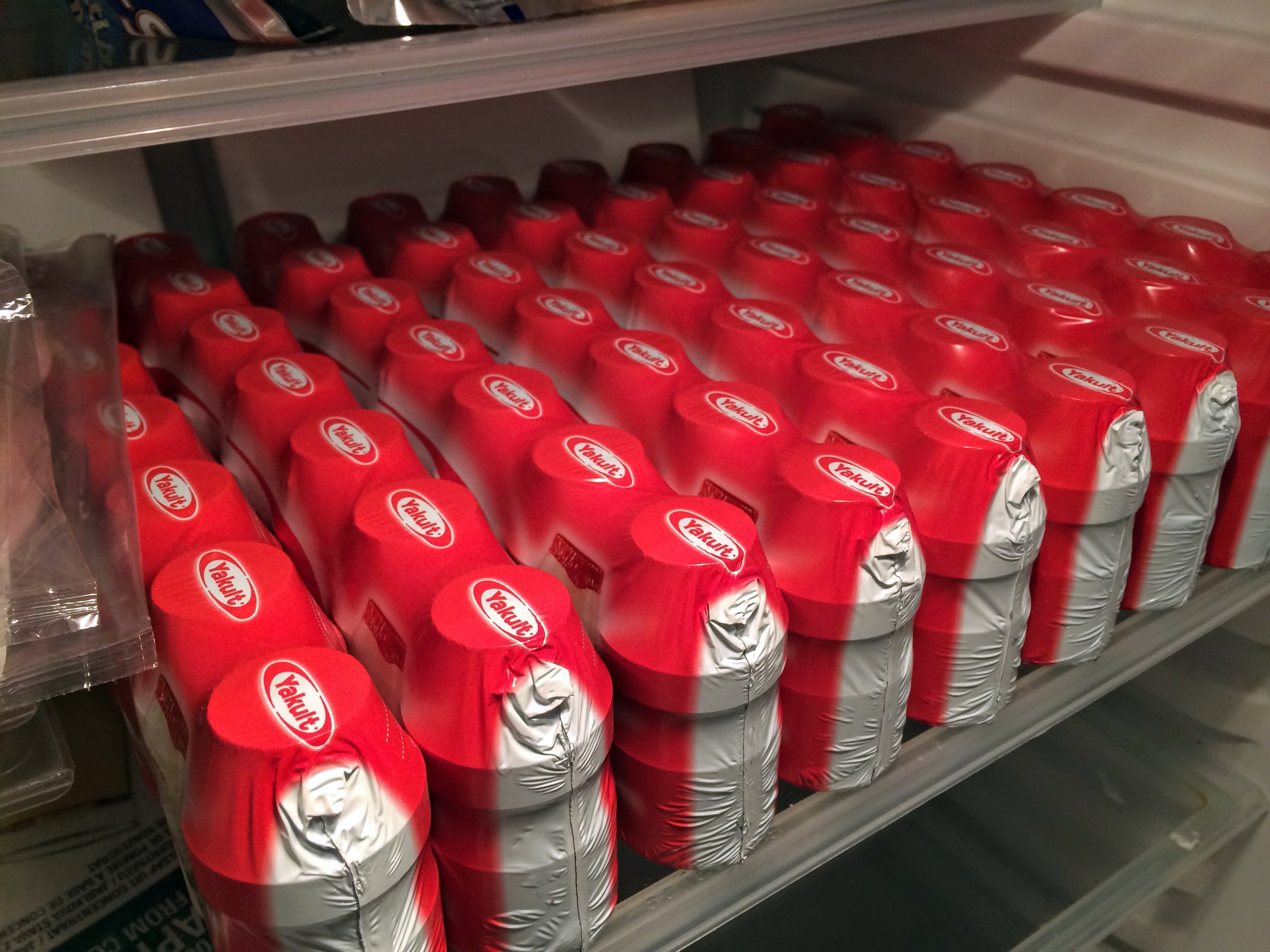
Yakult packs

Yakult was invented in 1935 in Japan by Minoru Shirota, who helped found the company Yakult Honsha to commercialize it. While Yakult is sold in supermarkets and convenience stores, in certain countries it is also delivered directly to customers' homes by "Yakult ladies".

=== History ===
In 1930, scientist Minoru Shirota strengthened and cultured the Lactobacillus casei Shirota strain. Five years later, in 1935, Yakult began production in Japan. The company continued to expand, and in 1955, Yakult Honsha was established.

In 1963, Yakult introduced a home delivery service, employing "Yakult ladies" to distribute the product directly to consumers. The following year, Yakult expanded internationally, beginning sales in Taiwan. In 1968, the company opened its first factory outside Japan in São Bernardo do Campo, Brazil. This international growth continued in 1969 with the establishment of Hong Kong Yakult Co., Ltd. and the founding of Korea Yakult in South Korea.

By 1981, Yakult had entered the Mexican market, opening a factory in the city of Ixtapaluca under the direction of Carlos Kasuga. Further expansion took place in 1994, with the product becoming available in Australia, Great Britain, and the United States.

In 2004, Yakult launched sales in New Zealand through its Australian operations. That same year, Yakult LIGHT was introduced in Australia, offering a lower-sugar alternative. In 2017, the company reformulated Yakult LIGHT to further reduce its sugar and energy content, replacing sugar with stevia.

In 2014, the company opened its first manufacturing facility in the United States, located in Fountain Valley, California.

=== Relationship with Danone ===
In February 2018, it was reported that Danone planned to sell US$1.9 billion of its Yakult investment, reducing its stake from 21% to 7%. Following the report, Yakult's share value declined. Danone had first purchased shares in Yakult in April 2000, and the sale was completed in March 2018.

=== In mass media ===
Gale (Wood Harris) drinks a bottle of Yakult in the 2015 film Ant-Man.

In September 2018, it was reported that the appearance of unlabelled Yakult bottles in the film To All the Boys I've Loved Before led to a rise in sales. This coincided with a 2.8% increase in Yakult's share price following the film's release on 17 August.

In January 2020, professional sumo wrestler Takakeishō Takanobu appeared in a television commercial advertising Yakult 1000.

== See also ==
- Actimel
- Bikkle
- Calpis
- Fermented milk products
- List of fermented foods
- Tokyo Yakult Swallows
