= Haruka Osawa =

Japanese footballer (born 2001)

Personal information
- Full name: Haruka Osawa
- Date of birth: 15 April 2001 (age 25)
- Place of birth: Tokyo Prefecture, Japan,
- Height: 1.61 m (5 ft 3 in)
- Position: Forward

Team information
- Current team: VfB Stuttgart
- Number: 10

Senior career*
Years	Team	Apps	(Gls)
2020–2025	JEF United Chiba	108	(22)
2025–	VfB Stuttgart	12	(4)

International career
2025–	Japan	2	(0)
- * Club domestic league appearances and goals as of 25 August 2026

Haruka Osawa (born 15 April 2001) is a Japanese professional footballer who plays as a forward for VfB Stuttgart and for the Japan national team

== Club career ==
Osawa made her WE League debut with JEF United Chiba on 20 September 2021. In the summer of 2025 she moved to VfB Stuttgart.
