= Yukino Inamura =

Japanese association football player

Personal information
- Date of birth: 19 February 2003 (age 23)
- Place of birth: Nagano Prefecture, Japan
- Height: 1.57 m (5 ft 2 in)
- Position: Midfielder

Team information
- Current team: AC Nagano Parceiro Ladies
- Number: 28

Senior career*
Years	Team	Apps	(Gls)
- AC Nagano Parceiro Ladies
- * Club domestic league appearances and goals

Yukino Inamura (born 19 February 2003) is a Japanese professional footballer who plays as a midfielder for WE League club AC Nagano Parceiro Ladies.

== Club career ==
Inamura made her WE League debut on 12 September 2021.
