= AC Nagano Parceiro Ladies =

- Full name: AC Nagano Parceiro Ladies (ja: AC長野パルセイロレディース)
- Nickname: Parceiro / AC Nagano
- Founded: 2000
- Ground: Nagano U Stadium
- Capacity: 15,491
- Chairman: Yoshiyuki Machida
- Head coach: Ryu Hirose
- League: WE League
- 2025–26: 12th
- Website: parceiro.co.jp/ladies/
Home colours	Away colours

AC Nagano Parceiro Ladies (AC長野パルセイロレディース) is a professional women's football club based in Nagano and affiliated with AC Nagano Parceiro. The team currently plays in the WE League, the highest division of women's football in Japan.

== Kits ==
=== Kit manufacturers and shirt sponsors ===
Period	Kit manufacturer	Shirt sponsor (chest)	Shirt sponsor (sleeve)
2016	Penalty	Hokuto	None
2017	Penalty	Hokuto	None
2018	Penalty	Hokuto	None
2019	Penalty	Hokuto	Densen
2020	Penalty	Hokuto	Sumihei
2021–2022	X-girl	Hokuto	Kyowa
2022–2023	Penalty	Hokuto	Kyowa
2023–2024	Penalty	Hokuto	None
2024–2025	Penalty	Hokuto	None

== Staff ==
As of 14 October 2022.

Role (Japanese)	Name
Manager	(Japan) Kyoka Sano
Head coach	(Japan) Ryu Hirose
Assistant Coach	(Japan) Yosuke Sakamoto
First-Team Coach	(Japan) Ayami Otaki
Goalkeeper Coach	(Japan) Yuichi Mizutani
Goalkeeper Assistant Coach	(Japan) Natsumi Ikegaya
Trainer	(Japan) Takumi Kobayashi (Japan) Daisuke Nagahama
Strengthening Officer	(Japan) Furano Maeda
Team Doctor	(Japan) Mitsuru Aizawa (Japan) Masataka Mochizuki (Japan) Kazutoshi Maruyama (Japan) Yuki Asano

=== Managerial history ===
Dates	Name
2003	(Japan) Taneda Kaori
2004	(Japan) Masahiko Okiyama
2005–2007	(Japan) Taneda Kaori
2008–2011	(Japan) Yosuke Kunugi
2012	(Japan) Toru Katsumata
2013–2019	(Japan) Midori Honda
2020	(Japan) Yuki Sano
2021–2022	(Japan) Tadashi Ogasahara
2022–present	(Japan) Kumiko Tashiro

== Players ==
=== Current squad ===
As of 13 November 2024.

Note: Flags indicate national team as defined under FIFA eligibility rules; some limited exceptions apply. Players may hold more than one non-FIFA nationality.

No.	Pos.	Nation	Player
1	GK	JPN	Yuria Ito
21	GK	JPN	Mao Umemura
31	GK	JPN	Yuka Kazama
3	DF	JPN	Yuka Okamoto
5	DF	JPN	Kurumi Iwashita
23	DF	JPN	Ami Kubota
24	DF	JPN	Suguri Hashitani
25	DF	JPN	Chisa Okugawa
26	DF	JPN	Shion Konose
27	DF	JPN	Nanao Chiku
29	DF	JPN	Yuki Sakai
6	MF	JPN	Hazuki Genma
7	MF	JPN	Sayaka Mitani
8	MF	JPN	Maho Murakami
14	MF	JPN	Maria Kikuchi
15	MF	JPN	Kotone Nakano
18	MF	JPN	Megumi Ito
20	MF	THA	Nutwadee Pramnak
22	MF	JPN	Kano Miyamoto
28	MF	JPN	Yukino Inamura
9	FW	JPN	Megumi Nakamura
10	FW	THA	Taneekarn Dangda
11	FW	JPN	Akimi Kawafune
13	FW	JPN	Rio Ouchi
17	FW	JPN	Hina Takahashi
19	FW	JPN	Nonoha Abe
30	FW	JPN	Koharu Tamai

== Season-by-season records ==
Seasons of AC Nagano Parceiro Ladies
Season	League				National Cup	League Cup	Asia
Season	Division (tier)	Level	Pos.	Tms.	National Cup	League Cup	Asia
2001	Tōkai Women's Soccer League	2	Champions	10	Second round	—	—
2002	Tōkai Women's Soccer League	2	Champions	10	Second round	—	—
2003	L	1	7th	13	Quarter-finals	—	—
2004	L1	1	8th	8	Second round	—	—
2005	L2	2	3rd	7	Second round	—	—
2006	Nadeshiko League Division 2	2	2nd	8	Quarter-finals	—	—
2007	Nadeshiko League Division 1	1	8th	8	Quarter-finals	Group stage	—
2008	Nadeshiko League; Division 2	2	4th	9	Third round	—	—
2009	Nadeshiko League; Division 2	2	5th	8	Third round	—	—
2010	Challenge League (EAST)	2	4th	6	First round	—	—
2011	Challenge League (EAST)	2	5th	6	First round	—	—
2012	Challenge League	2	11th	12	DNQ	—	—
2013	Challenge League	2	11th	16	First round	—	—
2014	Challenge League	2	4th	16	DNQ	—	—
2015	Nadeshiko League Division 2	2	Champions	10	First round	—	—
2016	Nadeshiko League Division 1	1	3rd	10	Quarter-finals	Group stage	—
2017	Nadeshiko League Division 1	1	6th	10	Quarter-finals	Group stage	—
2018	Nadeshiko League Division 1	1	7th	10	Quarter-finals	Group stage	—
2019	Nadeshiko League Division 1	1	9th	10	Third round	Group stage	—
2020	Nadeshiko League Division 2	2	5th	10	Second round	Cancelled	—
2021–22	WE League	1	7th	11	Fourth round	Not held	—
2022–23	WE League	1		11		Group stage	—
2023–24	WE League	1		12		Group stage	—
2024–25	WE League	1		12			—

== Transition of team name ==
- Ohara Gakuen JaSRA Ladies SC: 2000–2009
- AC Nagano Parceiro Ladies: 2010–present

== See also ==
- Japan Football Association (JFA)
- List of women's football clubs in Japan
