= Daisuke Muramatsu =

Japanese football manager (born 1977)

Personal information
- Date of birth: 8 June 1977 (age 49)
- Place of birth: Shizuoka Prefecture, Japan

Team information
- Current team: Albirex Niigata Ladies (head coach)

Managerial career
- Years: Team
- Albirex Niigata Ladies

Daisuke Muramatsu (born 8 June 1977) is a Japanese football manager who currently manages WE League club Albirex Niigata Ladies.
