= Bikkle =

Japanese yogurt drink

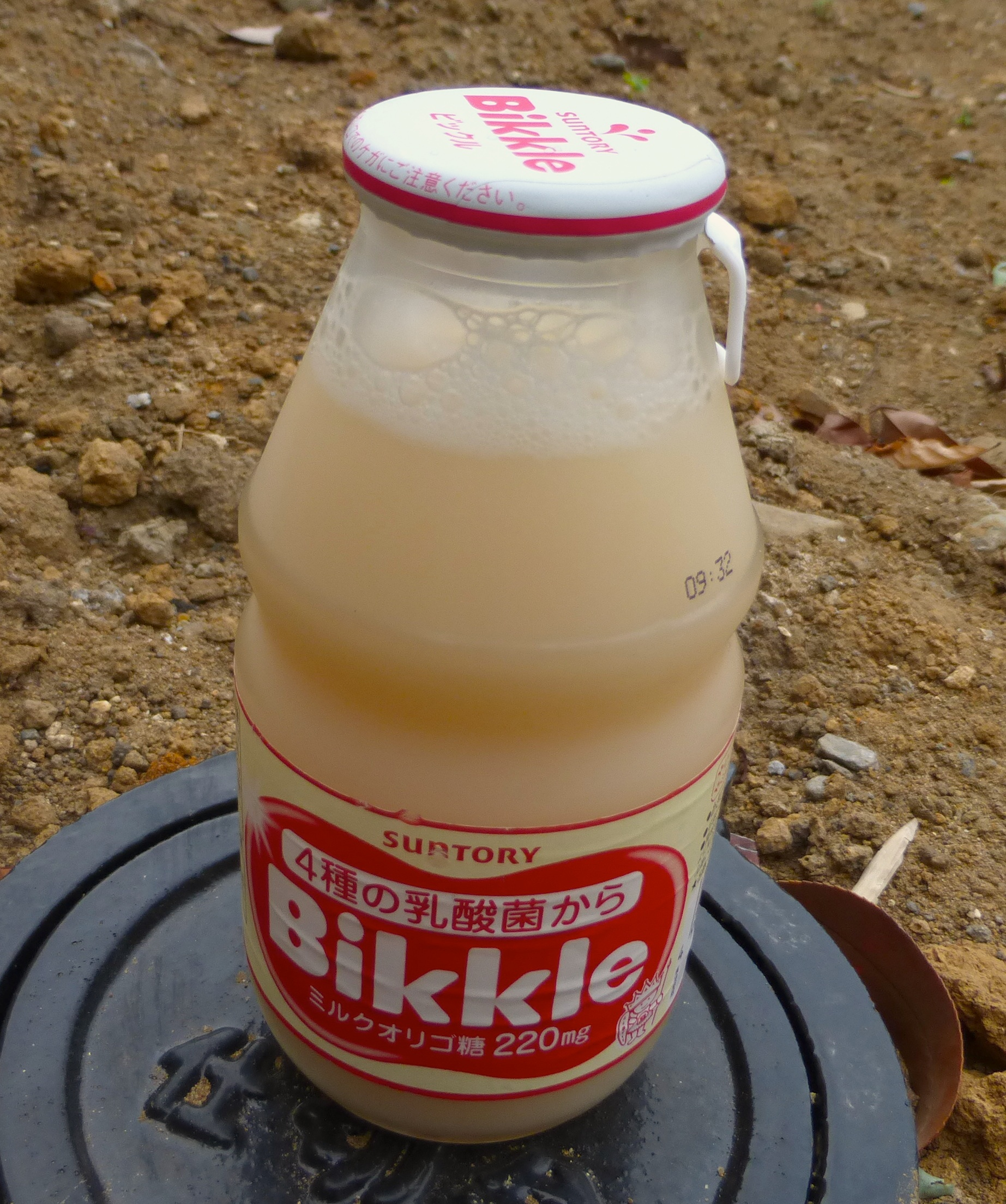
Bottle of Bikkle

Bikkle (ビックル) is a Japanese yogurt-based drink. Produced by Japanese drink giant Suntory, it can be found in vending machines for 100-120 yen and also at convenience stores and supermarkets. It comes in a small glass bottle, although since 2007, "Big Bikkle" is also available in a larger 500ml plastic bottle.

Bikkle is a popular drink among both the Japanese and expatriates living in Japan, with whom it has gained somewhat of a cult status due to the interesting-sounding name and unique taste. Many have described the taste of Bikkle to be similar to that of Yakult, or even oranges and cream.
