= Tadashi Ogasahara =

Japanese football manager

Personal information
- Date of birth: 12 September 1969 (age 57)
- Place of birth: Kyoto Prefecture, Japan

Team information
- Current team: AC Nagano Parceiro Ladies (manager)

Managerial career
- Years: Team
- AC Nagano Parceiro Ladies

Tadashi Ogasahara (born 12 September 1969) is a Japanese football manager who currently manages WE League club AC Nagano Parceiro Ladies.
