= Kanae Hayashi =

Japanese footballer (born 1994)

Personal information
- Date of birth: 27 February 1994 (age 32)
- Place of birth: Hyogo Prefecture, Japan
- Height: 1.63 m (5 ft 4 in)
- Position: Defender

Team information
- Current team: JEF United Chiba
- Number: 4

Senior career*
Years	Team	Apps	(Gls)
2016–	JEF United Chiba		

International career
2022–	Japan	1	(0)
- * Club domestic league appearances and goals

Kanae Hayashi (born 27 February 1994) is a Japanese professional footballer who plays as a defender for WE League club JEF United Chiba Ladies.

== Club career ==
Hayashi made her WE League debut on 20 September 2021.

== Career statistics ==
=== International ===
National Team	Year	Apps	Goals
Japan
Japan	2022	1	0
Total		1	0
