= Shinji Sarusawa =

Japanese footballer and manager

Shinji Sarusawa 猿澤 真治
Personal information
- Full name: Shinji Sarusawa
- Date of birth: June 9, 1969 (age 57)
- Place of birth: Hiroshima, Japan

Youth career
- 1985–1987: Hiroshima Technical High School
- 1988–1991: Osaka University of Health and Sport Sciences

Senior career*
Years	Team	Apps	(Gls)
1992–1999	Kagawa Shiun		

Managerial career
- 2017: Renofa Yamaguchi FC
- * Club domestic league appearances and goals

Shinji Sarusawa (猿澤 真治, Sarusawa Shinji; born June 9, 1969) is a Japanese football player and manager and current manager WE League club of JEF United Chiba.

== Playing career ==
Sarusawa was born in Hiroshima Prefecture on June 9, 1969. After graduating from Osaka University of Health and Sport Sciences, he played Kagawa Shiun from 1992 to 1999.

== Coaching career ==
In 2017, Sarusawa became a coach at J2 League club Renofa Yamaguchi FC under manager Nobuhiro Ueno. In May when Renofa was at the 20th place of 22 clubs, manager Ueno resigned for poor results. Sarusawa managed the club as caretaker. Although Sarusawa managed 2 matches, Renofa lost both matches. In June, Carlos Mayor became new manager, so Sarusawa he resigned as manager.

== Managerial statistics ==
Team	From	To	Record				
Team	From	To	G	W	D	L	Win %
Renofa Yamaguchi FC	2017	2017	2	0	0	2	0.00
Total			2	0	0	2	0.00
