= Minoru Shirota =

Japanese microbiologist

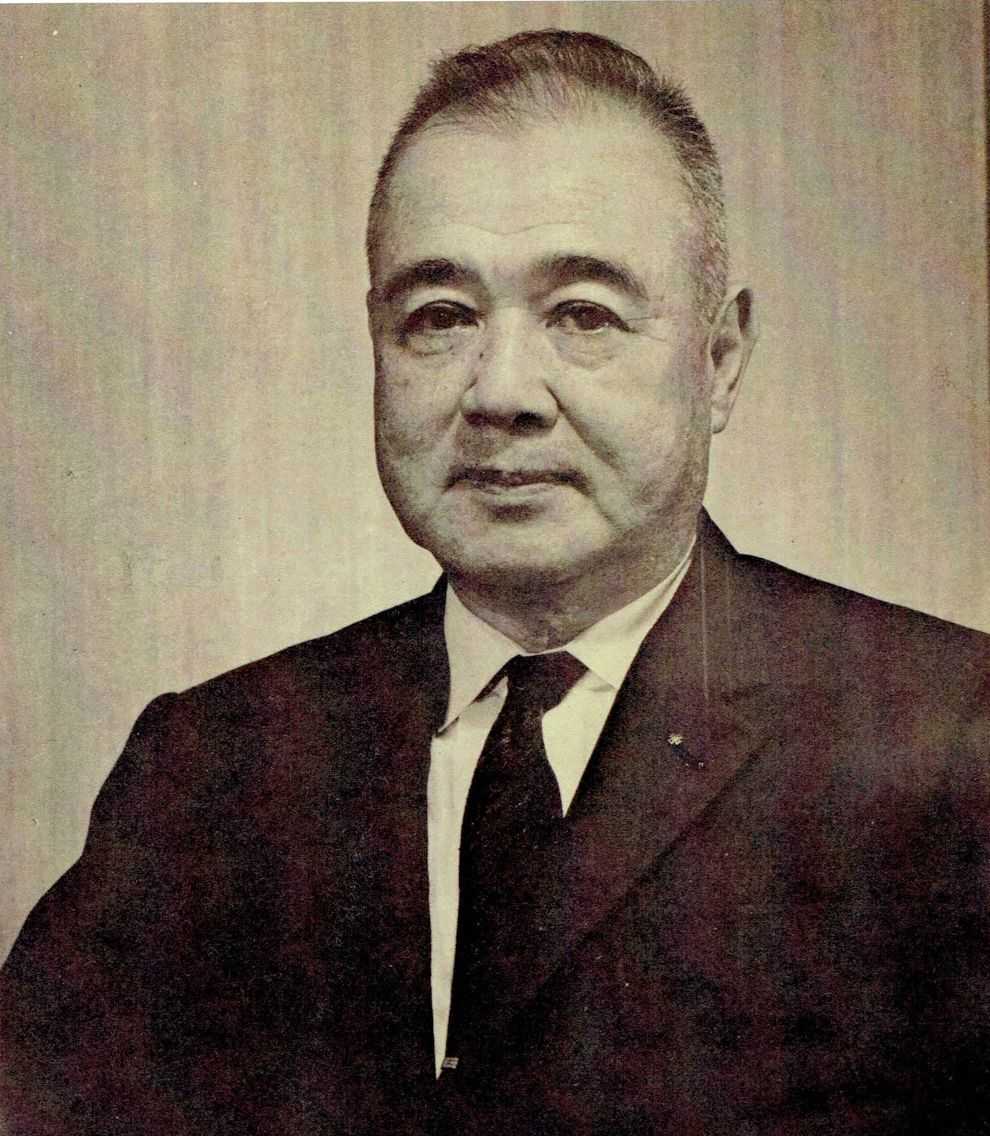
- Shirota in 1967
- Born: 代田 稔 (Shirota Minoru); 23 April 1899; Tatsuoka, Nagano, Japan
- Died: 10 March 1982 (aged 82); Tokyo, Japan
- Education: Kyoto University
- Occupation: Microbiologist
- Known for: Discovery of probiotic bacterium Invention of Yakult

Minoru Shirota (代田 稔, Shirota Minoru; 23 April 1899 – 10 March 1982) was a Japanese microbiologist who made pioneering research on gut microbiota and developed the first commercial probiotic. In the 1930, he identified a strain of lactic acid bacteria that is part of normal gut flora that he originally called Lactobacillus casei Shirota, which appeared to help contain the growth of harmful bacteria in the gut. The species was later reclassified as Lactobacillus paracasei.

Using his novel bacterium, Shirota produced the first probiotic yogurt, named Yakult in 1935. The commercial success of the beverage led to the establishment of the company Yakult Honsha and its subsidiary research organisation Yakult Central Institute in 1935.

== Biography ==
Shirota was born to a poor farming family in western Nagano, Japan. Inspired by the prevalent infectious diseases and malnutrition in his hometown, he chose to study medicine. In 1921, he entered the medical school of Kyoto University. After obtaining his doctoral degree, he joined the faculty and devoted his research on microbes important to health.

He died in Tokyo, Japan, in 1982.

== Scientific contribution ==
While studying different microbes of the digestive system in Kyoto University, Shirota came across Élie Metchnikoff's theory on aging and longevity. Nobel laureate, Metchnikoff was the founder of immunology who believed that longevity, such as in Bulgarians, was due habitual consumption of yogurt. He had identified a bacterium Lactobacillus bulgaricus (later reassigned Lactobacillus delbrueckii subsp. bulgaricus) as an ingredient of yogurt that he suggested as the cause of longevity. Shirota was keen to understand such bacterium. After a series of experiments, he found that the Bulgarian bacterium could not be the cause of health benefits. He discovered that the bacterium could not survive in acidic condition such as in the stomach. They were also difficult to maintain in culture so that isolation and storing them alive were impossible.

In 1930, Shirota found a type of bacteria (which he originally identified as Lactobacillus casei) from human faeces in 1930. He isolated a specific type (strain) that was resistant to gastric acid and digestive enzymes unlike Metchnikoff's bacterium. This was the discovery of Lactobacillus casei strain Shirota, which was later reclassified into the species Lacticaseibacillus paracasei in 2020. (However, L. paracasei Shirota is not yet recognised as a valid name under the International Code of Nomenclature of Prokaryotes.) Unlike Metchnikoff's bacterium, the new strain was easily cultured, isolated and maintained in the laboratory. Further, they could pass through the digestive system and multiply in the intestine. Shirota discovered that it was able to inhibit pathogenic bacteria present in the digestive system. He the used the isolated bacterium to treat diarrhoea during an outbreak.

Using his bacterium, Shirota prepared a fermented milk which he found was health beneficial for the digestive system. In 1935, he produced the first commercial probiotic beverage which he named Yakult (meaning yogurt). The gradual success of his laboratory product led to the establishment of the first probiotic company, Yakult Honsha, in Kyoto in 1955. The company was based on its Shirota Research Institute which was moved to Kunitachi, Tokyo, in 1967 and renamed Yakult Central Institute for Microbiological Research.
