= Yakult lady =

Woman selling Yakult products

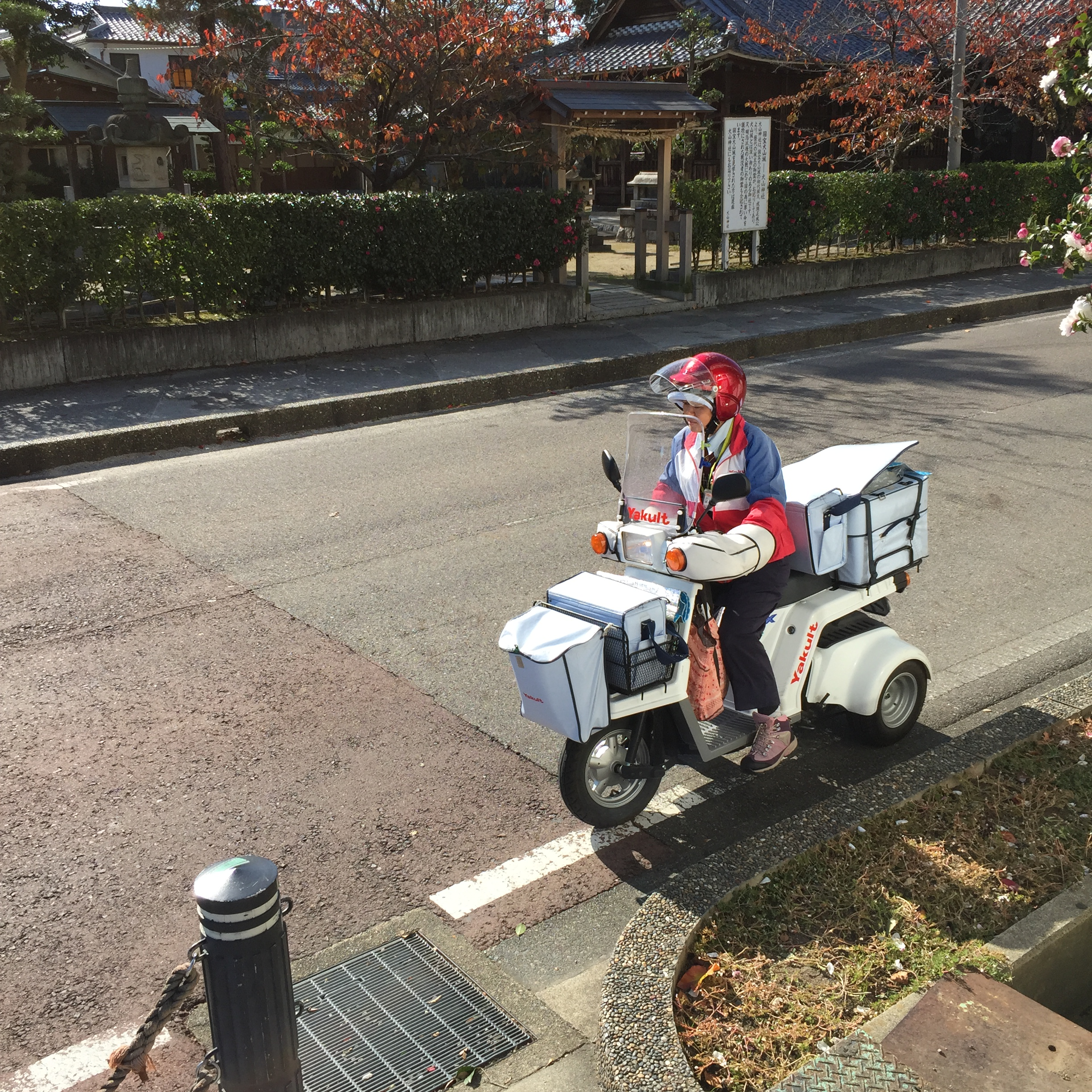
Yakult delivery in Japan

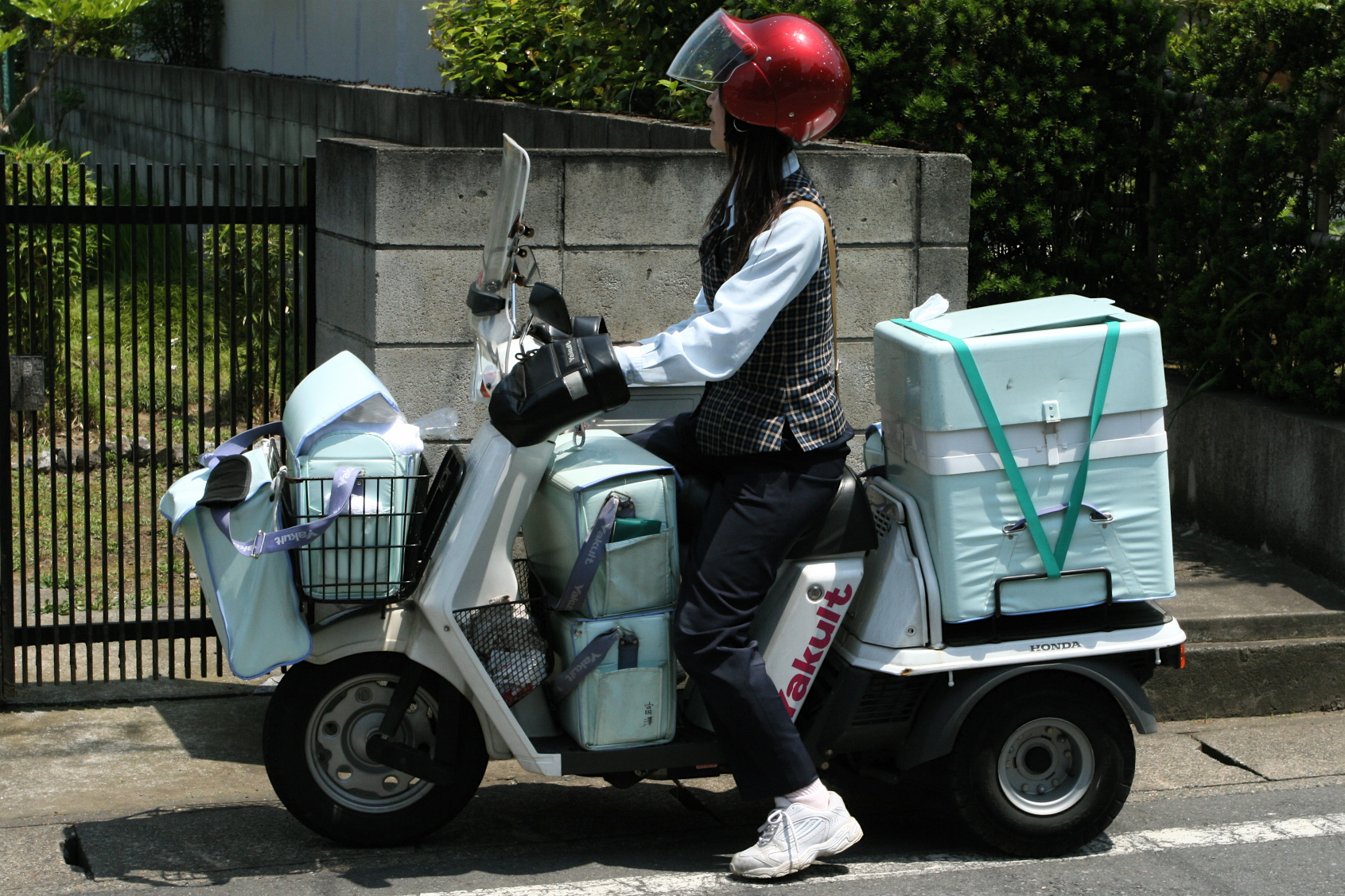
A Yakult lady in Japan

A Yakult lady (ヤクルトレディー; Yakuruto redī), also known as a Yakult auntie (ヤクルトおばさん; Yakuruto obasan), is a woman who sells Yakult products as an employee or delivers the products door to door to individuals at their homes. They sell and market Yakult products while riding bicycles, motorcycles, or other automobiles. They wear the company's uniform, including a hat and a pair of gloves. The Yakult lady home delivery system was introduced in 1963 while the Yakult Lady System started in 1981. Initially, all the salespeople were men, but labor shortages later led local distributors to hire women.

There have been many cases in which a Yakult lady's social standing has become more like that of an entrepreneur than that of a part-time worker. They are fairly similar to retail stores licensed to sell the products by Yakult themselves.

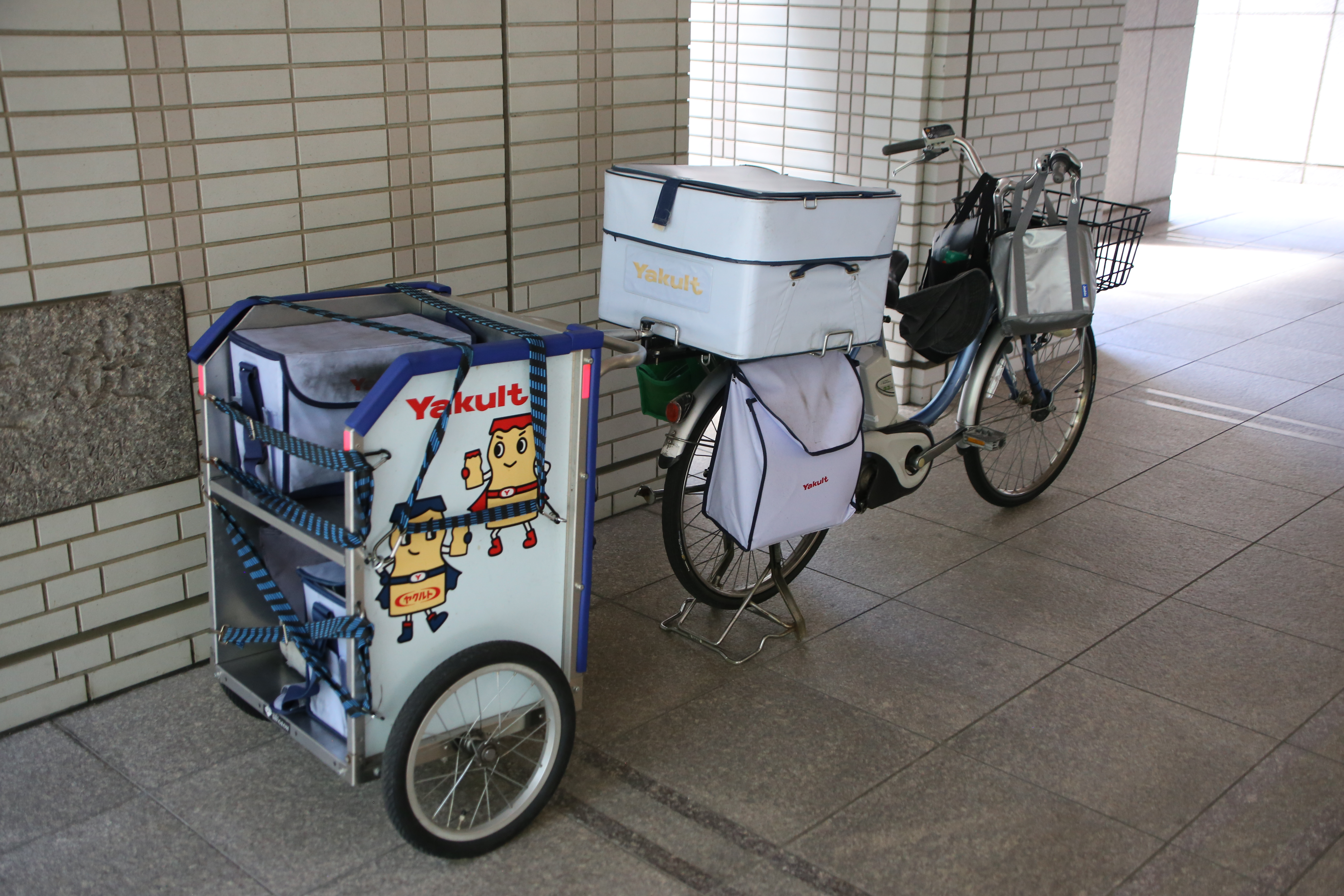
Yakult bicycle delivery

Yakult ladies operate in Japan, China, India, the Philippines, Indonesia and Thailand as well as Brazil. Although Yakult is sold in Western countries, Yakult ladies do not operate there. A trial of the system was introduced to Australia in 1994 but it was eventually disbanded.

The social/interpersonal aspect of the Yakult home delivery has been cited as a way to counter kodokushi, the unseen and unnoticed death at home of an elderly person. In the first half of 2024, kodokushi accounted for 37,227 deaths, and nearly 4,000 bodies were discovered more than a month after death, including 130 that remained unnoticed for over a year.

== See also ==
- Milk delivery
- Dabbawala
