= Yuki Sakai =

Japanese footballer

Yuki Sakai 坂井 優紀
Personal information
- Date of birth: January 10, 1989 (age 37)
- Place of birth: Chiba, Japan
- Height: 1.71 m (5 ft 7 1/2 in)
- Position: Defender

Team information
- Current team: Mynavi Sendai Ladies
- Number: 29

Youth career
- 2004–2006: Keimei Gakuin High School

Senior career*
Years	Team	Apps	(Gls)
2007–2008	Tasaki Perule FC	29	(3)
2009–2011	INAC Kobe Leonessa	24	(0)
2012–2020	Mynavi Vegalta Sendai	119	(14)
2021–2024	Omiya Ardija Ventus	2	(0)
2024–2025	AC Nagano Parceiro		
2025–	Mynavi Sendai		
Total		172	(17)

International career
2008	Japan U-20	1	(0)
2011	Japan	1	(0)
Medal record
Tasaki Perule FC
Runner-up	Nadeshiko League	2007
Runner-up	Empress's Cup	2007
INAC Kobe Leonessa
Winner	Nadeshiko League	2011
Winner	Empress's Cup	2010
Winner	Empress's Cup	2011
Mynavi Vegalta Sendai
Runner-up	Nadeshiko League	2015
- * Club domestic league appearances and goals as of December 31, 2018

Yuki Sakai (坂井 優紀, Sakai Yuki; born January 10, 1989) is a Japanese footballer who plays as a defender. She plays for Mynavi Sendai Ladies in the WE League and has also played for the Japan national team.

== Club career ==
Sakai was born in Chiba Prefecture on January 10, 1989. After graduating from high school, she joined Tasaki Perule FC in 2007. After the club was disbanded in 2008 due to financial strain, she moved to INAC Kobe Leonessa in 2009. In 2012, she moved to new club Vegalta Sendai (later Mynavi Vegalta Sendai).

== National team career ==
In November 2008, Sakai was selected for the Japan U-20 national team for the 2008 U-20 World Cup. In March 2011, she was selected for the Japan national team for 2011 Algarve Cup. At this competition, on March 9, she debuted against Sweden.

== National team statistics ==
Japan national team
Year	Apps	Goals
2011	1	0
Total	1	0
