= Sanfrecce Hiroshima Regina =

Japanese football club

Sanfrecce Hiroshima Regina サンフレッチェ広島レジーナ
- Full name: Sanfrecce Hiroshima Regina
- Nickname: Regina
- Founded: 2020
- Ground: Edion Peace Wing Hiroshima
- Capacity: 28,520
- Chairman: Shingo Senda
- Head coach: Megumu Yoshida
- League: WE League
- 2025-26: 4th
- Website: https://www.sanfrecce.co.jp/regina
Home colours	Away colours

Sanfrecce Hiroshima Regina (サンフレッチェ広島レジーナ, Sanfuretchehiroshima Rejīna) is a women's professional football club playing in the WE League. Its hometown is Hiroshima.

== Kits ==
=== Kit suppliers and shirt sponsors ===
Period	Kit manufacturer	Shirt sponsor (chest)	Shirt sponsor (sleeve)
2021–present	Nike	Edion	None

== Club staff ==
Position	Name
Manager	(Japan) Megumi Yoshida
Assistant Manager	(Japan) Shun Suzuki
First-Team Coach	(Japan) Shiho Takahata
Goalkeeper Coach	(Japan) Naoto Kohno
Competent	(Japan) Sawa Bando
Trainer	(Japan) Koba Matsumoto

== Players ==
=== Current squad ===
As of 14 January 2025.

Note: Flags indicate national team as defined under FIFA eligibility rules; some limited exceptions apply. Players may hold more than one non-FIFA nationality.

No.	Pos.	Nation	Player
1	GK	JPN	Runa Konomi
2	DF	JPN	Yukari Kinga
3	DF	JPN	Eriko Goya
4	DF	JPN	Kaede Nakamura
5	DF	JPN	Chisato Ichinose
6	DF	JPN	Momoko Sayama
8	MF	JPN	Ai Ogawa
9	FW	JPN	Mami Ueno
10	MF	JPN	Chise Takizawa
11	FW	JPN	Yoshino Nakashima
13	FW	JPN	Miyuki Takahashi
14	MF	JPN	Manaka Matsumoto
15	DF	JPN	Natsumi Fujiu

No.	Pos.	Nation	Player
16	MF	JPN	Miku Hayama
18	MF	JPN	Mai Watanabe
19	FW	JPN	Mao Yoshino
20	MF	JPN	Namie Shimabukuro
21	GK	JPN	Koharu Maki
22	GK	JPN	Nanami Fujita
23	MF	JPN	Funa Yanase
25	MF	JPN	Maaya Shiota
26	MF	JPN	Yo Tachibana
27	DF	JPN	Soran Mori
28	FW	JPN	Hanano Koga
29	MF	JPN	Ayano Kasahara
30	FW	PRK	Ri Song-a
31	GK	JPN	Miho Fukumoto
32	GK	JPN	Hinaha Ishida
38	DF	JPN	Hana Shimada

== Honours ==
=== Domestic ===
- Empress's Cup
  - Champions (1): 2025
- WE League Cup
  - Champions (2): 2023–24, 2024–25

== Season-by-season records ==
Seasons of Sanfrecce Hiroshima Regina
Season	Domestic League				Empress's Cup	WE League Cup
Season	League	Level	Position	Teams	Empress's Cup	WE League Cup
2021–22	WE League	1	6th	11	Quarter-finals	—
2022–23	WE League	1	5th	11	Quarter-finals	Group stage
2023–24	WE League	1	5th	12	Semi-finals	Champions
2024–25	WE League	1	5th	12	Quarter-finals	Champions
2025–26	WE League	1	TBD	12	Champions	Semi-finals

== See also ==
- Japan Football Association (JFA)
- 2022–23 in Japanese football
- List of women's football clubs in Japan
