= 2024–25 WE League =

Fourth season of the top Japanese women's association football league

WE League
- Season: 2024–25
- Dates: 14 September 2024 – 17 May 2025
- Champions: NTV Tokyo Verdy Beleza (1st title)
- AFC Champions League: NTV Tokyo Verdy Beleza
- Matches: 132
- Goals: 339 (2.57 per match)
- Top goalscorer: Carlota Suárez (13 goals)
- Biggest home win: INAC Kobe Leonessa 6–0 Mynavi Sendai (11 May 2025)
- Highest scoring: Mynavi Sendai 3–6 Albirex Niigata (13 April 2025)
- Longest winning run: 6 matches (INAC Kobe Leonessa, NTV Tokyo Verdy Beleza)
- Longest unbeaten run: 17 matches (Urawa Reds)
- Longest winless run: 11 matches (Omiya Ardija Ventus, Mynavi Sendai)
- Longest losing run: 6 matches (Mynavi Sendai)
- Highest attendance: 26,605
- Lowest attendance: 414
- Total attendance: 282,221
- Average attendance: 2,138

The 2024–25 WE League season (Japanese: 2024–25 WEリーグ, Hepburn: 2024–25 WE Rīgu) was the 4th season of the WE League since its establishment in 2020. The league begin on 14 September 2024 and end on 17 May 2025.
