= Naoki Kusunose =

Japanese footballer and manager

Personal information
- Full name: Naoki Kusunose
- Date of birth: April 17, 1964 (age 62)
- Place of birth: Tokyo, Japan
- Position: Defender

Youth career
- 1983–1986: Hosei University

Senior career*
Years	Team	Apps	(Gls)
1987–1990	Yomiuri		
1990–1995	Honda		

Managerial career
- 2012: FC Machida Zelvia (caretaker)
- 2013: FC Machida Zelvia (caretaker)
- 2015–2018: Japan Women U-17
- 2021-: Urawa Red Diamonds Ladies
Medal record
Yomiuri
Runner-up	Japan Soccer League	1989/90
Winner	Emperor's Cup	1987
Honda
Runner-up	JSL Cup	1991
- * Club domestic league appearances and goals

Naoki Kusunose (楠瀬 直木, Kusunose Naoki; born April 17, 1964) is a Japanese football manager and former player. Currently, he is head coach of the Japan women's national under-17 football team and manager of WE League club Urawa Red Diamonds.

== Playing career ==
Naoki Kusunose played for Yomiuri and Honda as defender.

== Coaching career ==
Naoki Kusunose became manager for some youth team; e.g. Hakuoh University, Tokyo Verdy youth team. Since 2012, he became stuff for FC Machida Zelvia. In November, manager; Osvaldo Ardiles was sacked. Naoki Kusunose managed team as caretaker. After that, Yutaka Akita was appointed new manager. But In June 2013 manager; Yutaka Akita was sacked. So, Naoki Kusunose managed team as caretaker again until end of 2013 season. In February 2015, Naoki Kusunose became head coach for Japan women's U-17 national team (aiming for 2016 FIFA U-17 Women's World Cup in Jordan). In November, Japan won second position in 2015 AFC U-16 Women's Championship and qualified for 2016 FIFA U-17 Women's World Cup. He resigned before 2018 FIFA U-17 Women's World Cup in November.
