= Carlota Suárez =

Spanish footballer (born 1997

Personal information
- Full name: Carlota Suárez Crespo
- Date of birth: 19 July 1997 (age 29)
- Place of birth: Vigo, Spain
- Position: Forward

Team information
- Current team: CD Tenerife

College career
| Years | Team | Apps | (Gls) |
| 2016 | Tyler Junior College Apaches | 24 | (24) |
| 2017–2019 | Sam Houston Bearkats | | |

Senior career*
| Years | Team | Apps | (Gls) |
- CF Pozuelo de Alarcón
| 2019–2022 | Real Oviedo | | |
| 2022–2023 | Deportivo de La Coruña | | |
| 2023–2024 | Granada CF | 27 | (5) |
| 2024–2025 | INAC Kobe Leonessa | 22 | (13) |
| 2025– | CD Tenerife | 18 | (7) |
- * Club domestic league appearances and goals as of 2 September 2026

Carlota Suárez Crespo (born 19 July 1997) is a Spanish professional footballer who plays as a forward for INAC Kobe Leonessa.

== Early life ==
Suárez was born on 19 July 1997 in Vigo, Spain. A native of Galicia, Spain, she attended Tyler Junior College and Sam Houston State University in the United States, where she played for their soccer teams.

== Career ==
Suárez started her career with Spanish side CF Pozuelo de Alarcón. In 2019, she signed for Spanish side Real Oviedo. Subsequently, she signed for Spanish side Deportivo de La Coruña in 2022.

Ahead of the 2023–24 season, she signed for Spanish side Granada CF, where she made twenty-seven league appearances and scored five goals. Spanish newspaper Ideal wrote in 2023 that she "become one of [coach] Roger Lamesa's preferred options in the Red and Whites' attack" while playing for the club. One year later, she signed for Japanese side INAC Kobe Leonessa, where she scored five goals in her first seven appearances.

== Style of play ==
Suárez plays as a forward. Known for her speed and aerial ability, she has received comparisons to Norway international Erling Haaland.
