= JEF United Chiba Ladies =

JEF United Chiba Ladies ジェフユナイテッド市原・千葉レディース
- Full name: JEF United Ichihara Chiba Ladies
- Nicknames: JEF Ladies; JEF United Chiba Ladies
- Founded: 1992
- Ground: Ichihara Seaside Stadium; Ichihara, Chiba
- Capacity: 14,051
- Chairman: Hideyuki Maeda
- Manager: Shinji Sarusawa
- League: WE League
- 2025–26: 9th
- Website: https://jefunited.co.jp/teams/ladies/
Home colours	Away colours

JEF United Chiba Ladies, also known by their full name JEF United Ichihara Chiba Ladies (ジェフユナイテッド市原・千葉レディース, Jefu Yunaiteddo Ichihara Chiba), is a Japanese professional women's football club that plays in the WE League.

== Kits ==
=== Kit suppliers and shirt sponsors ===
Period	Kit manufacturer	Shirt sponsor (chest)	Shirt sponsor (sleeve)
2021–2022	X-girl	Yakult Honsha	
2022–2023	X-girl	Yakult Honsha	Viewcard
2023–2024	X-girl	Furukawa Electric	Viewcard

== Players ==
=== First-team squad ===
As of 26 August 2023.

Note: Flags indicate national team as defined under FIFA eligibility rules; some limited exceptions apply. Players may hold more than one non-FIFA nationality.

No.	Pos.	Nation	Player
1	GK	JPN	Shiori Shimizu
2	DF	JPN	Maho Fujishiro
3	DF	JPN	Nanami Ishida
4	DF	JPN	Kanae Hayashi
5	DF	JPN	Mariko Tanaka
6	DF	JPN	Makoto Hasuwa
7	FW	JPN	Yuki Ogawa
8	MF	JPN	Natsuki Kishikawa
9	FW	JPN	Haruka Osawa
10	MF	JPN	Miho Kamogawa
13	MF	JPN	Nanami Sone
14	DF	JPN	Tamaki Okuma

No.	Pos.	Nation	Player
15	MF	JPN	Chika Kato
16	FW	JPN	Sara Imada
17	MF	JPN	Chihiro Yamaguchi
18	MF	JPN	Yuka Anzai
19	DF	JPN	Saki Ueno
20	MF	JPN	Miu Kitamura
22	DF	JPN	Chisato Inoue
23	MF	JPN	Hinata Kobayashi
24	MF	JPN	Reina Shirowa
28	DF	JPN	Makoto Tasaki
30	GK	JPN	Akane Okuma
33	GK	JPN	Moeka Yonezawa
38	MF	JPN	Kirara Fujio
	MF	KOR	Yeo Min-Ji

=== Former notable players ===
- (Japan) Karina Maruyama (2010–2011)
- (Japan) Yuika Sugasawa (2013–2016)
- (Japan) Erina Yamane (2012 – June 2017)

== Club officials ==
Position	Name
Manager	(Japan) Shinji Sarusawa
Assistant Manager	(Japan) Katsura Ehashi
Goalkeeper Coach	(Japan) Masahiko Ashikawa
Conditioning Coach	(Japan) Yuka Shimizu
Technicial Staff	(Japan) Asako Sakurabayashi
Chief Trainer	(Japan) Minami Tsukamoto
Trainer	(Japan) Mai Mizusawa
Competent	(Japan) Sakiko Ogura
General Manager	(Japan) Shoko Mikami

== Honours ==
=== Domestic ===
- Empress's Cup
  - Runners-up (2): 2012, 2021
- Nadeshiko League Cup
  - Champions (1): 2017
  - Runners-up (1): 2016

== Season-by-season record ==
Seasons of JEF United Chiba Ladies
Season	Domestic League				Empress's Cup	Nadeshiko League Cup / WE League Cup
Season	League	Level	Place	Tms.	Empress's Cup	Nadeshiko League Cup / WE League Cup
1994	—	—	—	—	Second round	—
1995	Kanto	3	Champions	6	DNQ	—
1996	Kanto	2	—	—	DNQ	—
1997	Kanto	2	Champions	8	DNQ	—
1998	Kanto	2	Champions	8	DNQ	—
1999	Kanto	2	Champions	8	First round	—
2000	L	1	8th	9	Quarter-finals	—
2001	L	1	9th	10	Second round	—
2002	L	1	9th	11	Quarter-finals	—
2003	L	1	12th	13	First round	—
2004	L2	2	5th	6	First round	—
2005	L2	2	5th	7	Second round	—
2006	Nadeshiko; Div.2	2	4th	8	Third round	—
2007	Nadeshiko; Div.2	2	2nd	8	Third round	Group stage
2008	Nadeshiko; Div.2	2	Champions	9	Third round	—
2009	Nadeshiko Div.1	1	5th	8	Quarter-finals	—
2010	Nadeshiko	1	7th	10	Quarter-finals	Group stage
2011	Nadeshiko	1	7th	9	Quarter-finals	—
2012	Nadeshiko	1	6th	10	Runners-up	Group stage
2013	Nadeshiko	1	7th	10	Quarter-finals	Semi-finals
2014	Nadeshiko	1	5th	10	Semi-finals	—
2015	Nadeshiko; Div.1	1	5th	10	Quarter-finals	—
2016	Nadeshiko; Div.1	1	7th	10	Quarter-finals	Runners-up
2017	Nadeshiko; Div.1	1	7th	10	Semi-finals	Winners
2018	Nadeshiko; Div.1	1	6th	10	Semi-finals	Group stage
2019	Nadeshiko; Div.1	1	5th	10	Second round	Group stage
2020	Nadeshiko; Div.1	1	6th	10	Quarter-finals	—
2021–22	WE League	1	4th	11	Runners-up	—
2022–23	WE League	1	8th	11	Round of 16	Group stage
2023–24	WE League	1	TBD	12	TBD	TBD

== Transition of team name ==
- JEF United Ichihara Ladies: 1992–2004
- JEF United Chiba Ladies: 2005–present

== See also ==
- Japan Football Association (JFA)
- List of women's football clubs in Japan
- 2022–23 in Japanese football
