= Yakult Honsha =

Japanese company known for probiotic beverages

Yakult Honsha Company, Limited

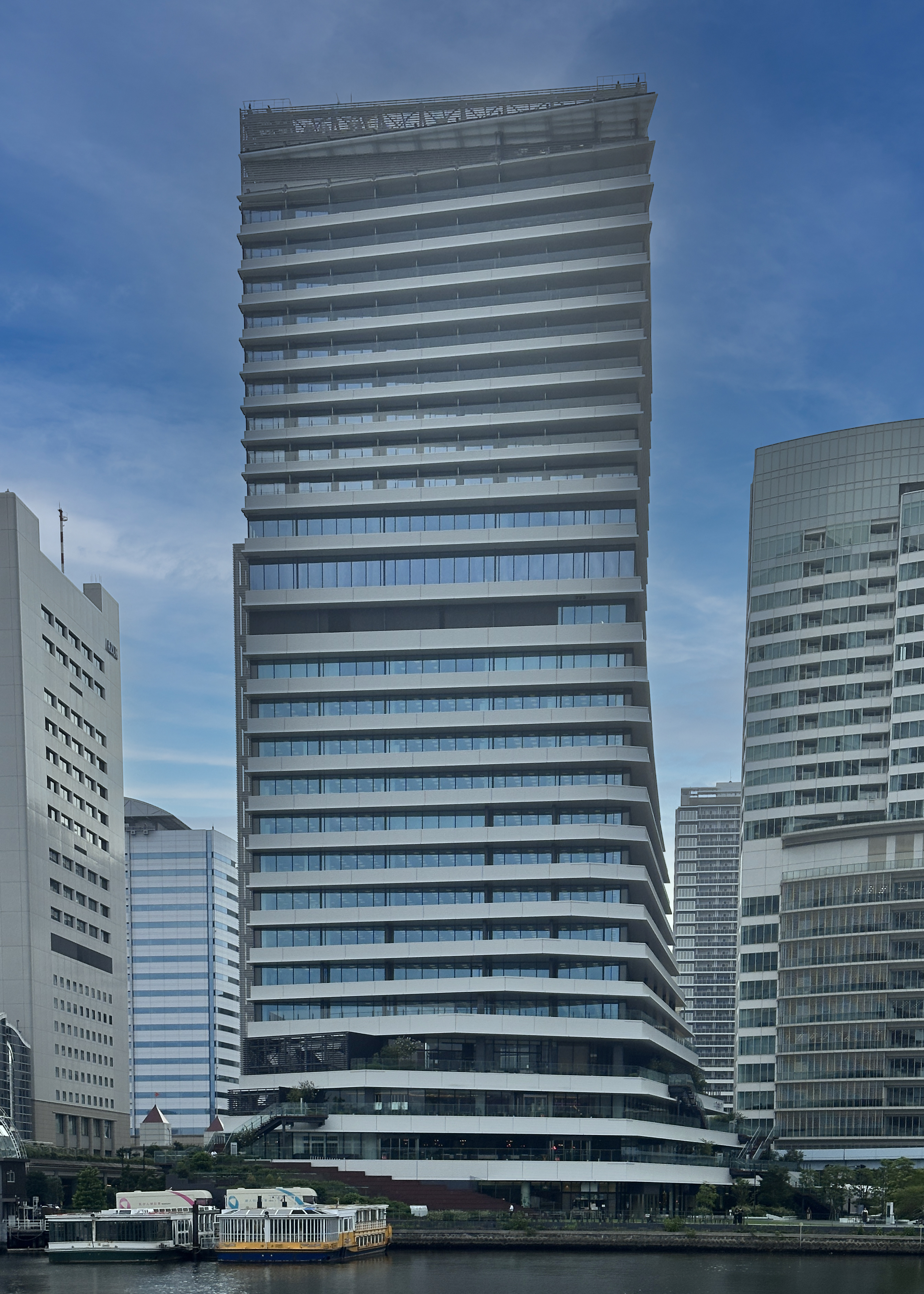
- Headquarters in Kaigan, Minato, Tokyo
- Company type: Public KK
- Traded as: TYO: 2267
- Industry: Probiotic Drinks
- Founded: January 29, 1955; 71 years ago
- Founder: Minoru Shirota
- Headquarters: Minato-ku, Tokyo, Japan
- Key people: Sumiya Hori (Chairman); Khamis Agear (EVP for global operation)
- Products: Yakult
- Website: www.yakult.co.jp

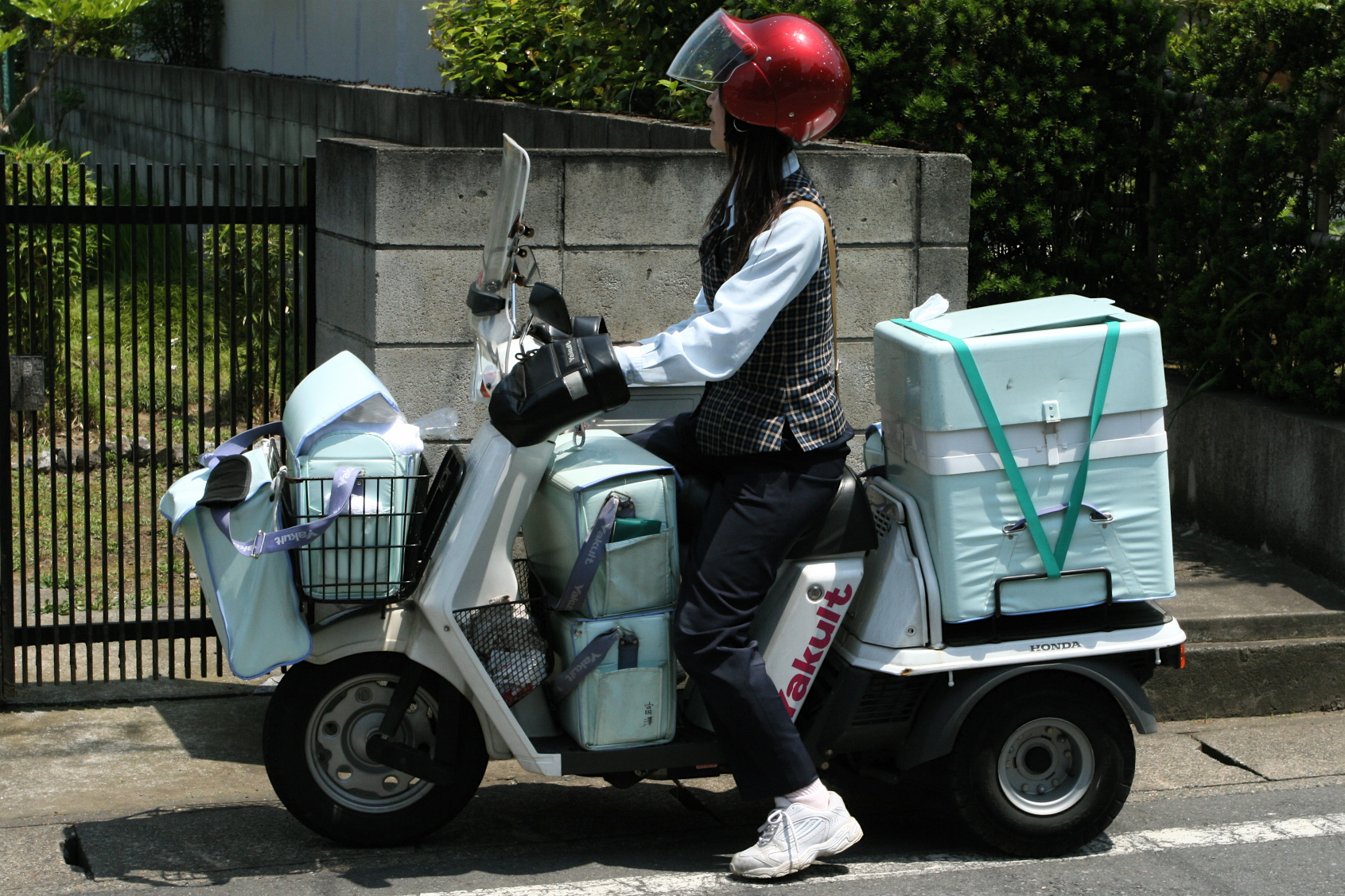
A Yakult lady in Japan

Yakult Honsha Company, Limited (株式会社ヤクルト本社, Kabushiki-gaisha Yakuruto Honsha) is a Japanese multinational corporation. It produces Yakult, a probiotic beverage using lactic acid bacteria discovered by Minoru Shirota in the 1920s. The company markets other products, owns the Tokyo Yakult Swallows baseball team, and promotes “Shirota-ism,” a philosophy of affordable pricing and the belief that a healthy intestine prolongs life, as reported by the Financial Times. Yakult operates in India through a 50:50 joint venture with Danone.

== History ==
Yakult Honsha was founded in 1955. Since 1963, Yakult has employed women, known as Yakult Ladies (ヤクルトレディー, Yakuruto Redī) or Yakult Aunties (ヤクルトおばさん, Yakuruto Obasan), to deliver products to homes via bicycles or motorcycles. That initiative, enhancing female workforce participation, accounts for 60% of bottled Yakult sales. Their numbers in Japan declined from 65,700 in 1973 to 42,500 in 2009. In the early 1980s, Carlos Kasuga, a Mexican of Japanese descent, established Yakult Mexico. In 1998, Yakult Honsha incurred $813 million in derivatives market losses, drawing international attention. In 2000, The Japan Times reported that the company paid a criminal syndicate annually to prevent disruptions at shareholder meetings, masking payments as advertising costs. In 2010, Yakult established a U.S. subsidiary and built a factory in Fountain Valley, California, which began production in 2014. Danone, once holding 21% of Yakult Honsha shares, reduced its stake to 7% in 2018 but remains the largest shareholder.
