= Chifure AS Elfen Saitama =

Japanese football club

Chifure AS Elfen Saitama ちふれASエルフェン埼玉
- Full name: Chifure AS Elfen Saitama
- Nickname: AS Saitama
- Founded: 1991
- Chairman: Hideo Saotome
- Head coach: Ikegaya Takashi
- League: WE League
- 2025–26: 11th
- Website: https://www.as-elfen.co.jp/
Home colours	Away colours

Chifure AS Elfen Saitama (ちふれASエルフェン埼玉) is a Japanese professional women's football club from Saitama. Founded in 1991, they have played in the WE League since 2021.

== Kits ==
=== Kit suppliers and shirt sponsors ===
Period	Kit manufacturer	Shirt sponsor (chest)	Shirt sponsor (sleeve)
2021–2022	X-girl	Chifure	
2022–2023	X-girl	Chifure	Tamura
2023–2024	X-girl	Chifure	Tamura

== Mascot ==
=== Elrun ===
- A symbol of peace that brings smiles and abundance.
- The guardian deity of the stadium, who encourages everyone's peace of mind, safety, and free interaction.
- The motif is the adorable and agile giant flying squirrel that inhabits the mountains of Saitama.
- Gender: Genderless.

==== Chi-chan ====
- The stadium's symbol of good luck, which is said to bring happiness when you meet it.
- "Erurun" was created with her magical powers, and even Chichaku is a big presence.
- The motif is the wild bird "kingfisher" that emits vivid colors in the clear waters of Saitama.
- Gender: Genderless.

==== Nyatetsu ====
- I love to be mischievous and have fun. A friend of the stadium who is honest and kind.
- The motif is a “street cat” that is strong, reliable, and lively.
- Gender: Genderless.

== Staff ==
As of 14 June 2022

- Manager: Tomoe Tanabe
- Assistant manager: Teppei Noguchi
- Goalkeeping coach: Nozomi Yamago
- Physical coach and trainer: Mitsui Hisatsugu
- Technical Staff: Yuhei Itagaki
- Trainer: Yuka Ito
- Competent: Misato Nunoyama

== Players ==
=== Current squad ===
As of 3 September 2023.

Note: Flags indicate national team as defined under FIFA eligibility rules; some limited exceptions apply. Players may hold more than one non-FIFA nationality.

No.	Pos.	Nation	Player
1	GK	JPN	Natsumi Asano
2	DF	JPN	Shiori Kinoshita
3	DF	JPN	Akari Matsukubo
4	DF	JPN	Maho Hashinuma
5	MF	JPN	Kozue Setoguchi
6	MF	JPN	Yuki Seno
7	MF	JPN	Yoshino Osone
8	MF	JPN	Yuna Sonoda
9	FW	JPN	Eriko Arakawa
10	MF	JPN	Riko Yoshida
13	DF	JPN	Miki Sakuma
14	FW	JPN	Shoko Uemura

No.	Pos.	Nation	Player
15	MF	JPN	Chihiro Oda
17	MF	JPN	Mayu Karahashi
18	FW	JPN	Hina Takahashi
19	DF	JPN	Risa Kanehira
20	DF	JPN	Minori Kishi
21	GK	JPN	Miori Ono
22	FW	JPN	Faye Brough
23	DF	JPN	Hana Matsumoto
24	DF	JPN	Ayuka Onuma
25	MF	JPN	Hitomi Yamakata
28	FW	JPN	Sakura Hirose
29	MF	JPN	Hikaru Yumura

== Honours ==
=== Domestic ===
- Nadeshiko League Division 2
  - Runners-up (2): 2016, 2020
- Nadeshiko League Cup Division 2
  - Runners-up (1): 2019

== Season-by-season record ==
Seasons of Chifure AS Elfen Saitama
Season	Domestic League				Empress's Cup	Nadeshiko League Cup/WE League Cup
Season	League	Level	Place	Tms.	Empress's Cup	Nadeshiko League Cup/WE League Cup
1993	Saitama	3	2nd	—	DNQ	—
1994	Saitama	3	2nd	—	DNQ	—
1995	Saitama	3	2nd	—	DNQ	—
1996	Saitama	3	Champions	—	DNQ	—
1997	Saitama	3	Champions	—	Second round	—
1998	Saitama	3	2nd	—	DNQ	—
1999	Saitama	3	Champions	—	DNQ	—
2000	Kanto	2		8	DNQ	—
2001	Kanto	2	2nd	8	Second round	—
2002	L	1	8th	11	Second round	—
2003	L	1	10th	13	Second round	—
2004	L2	2	3rd	6	First round	—
2005	L2	2	4th	7	Second round	—
2006	Nadeshiko Div.2	2	5th	8	Third round	—
2007	Nadeshiko Div.2	2	4th	8	Third round	Group stage
2008	Nadeshiko Div.2	2	3rd	9	Second round	—
2009	Nadeshiko Div.2	2	Champions	8	Third round	—
2010	Nadeshiko	1	9th	10	Second round	Group stage
2011	Nadeshiko	1	8th	9	Quarter-finals	—
2012	Nadeshiko	1	9th	10	Quarter-finals	Group stage
2013	Challenge	2	2nd	16	Third round	—
2014	Nadeshiko	1	8th	10	Third round	—
2015	Nadeshiko Div.1	1	10th	10	Quarter-finals	—
2016	Nadeshiko Div.2	2	2nd	10	Third round	Group stage / Div.2
2017	Nadeshiko Div.1	1	9th	10	Third round	Group stage
2018	Nadeshiko Div.2	2	3rd	10	First round	Group stage
2019	Nadeshiko Div.2	2	3rd	10	Semi-finals	Runners-up / Div.2
2020	Nadeshiko Div.2	2	2nd	10	Third round	Cancelled
2021–22	WE League	1	11th	11	Fourth round	—
2022–23	WE League	1	11th	11	Semi-finals	Group stage
2023–24	WE League	1	TBD	12	TBD	TBD

== Transition of team name ==
- AS Elfen FC: 1991–2001
- AS Elfen Sayama FC: 2002–2013
- AS Elfen Saitama: 2014–2015
- Chifure AS Elfen Saitama: 2016–present

== See also ==
- Japan Football Association (JFA)
- List of women's football clubs in Japan
- 2022–23 in Japanese football
