= WE League =

Japanese association football league

- Organising body: WE League; JFA
- Founded: 3 June 2020; 6 years ago
- First season: 2021–22
- Country: Japan
- Confederation: AFC
- Divisions: 1
- Number of clubs: 12
- Level on pyramid: 1
- Domestic cup: Empress's Cup
- League cup: WE League Cup
- International cup: AFC Women's Champions League
- Current champions: INAC Kobe Leonessa (2nd title) (2025–26)
- Most championships: INAC Kobe Leonessa; Urawa Red Diamonds (2 titles)
- Broadcaster(s): DAZN
- Sponsor(s): Sompo
- Website: Official website
- Current: 2025–26 WE League season

The WE League (Japanese: WEリーグ, Hepburn: WE Rīgu), officially the Japan Women's Empowerment Professional Football League (日本女子プロサッカーリーグ, Nihon Joshi Puro Sakkā Rīgu; "Japan Women Pro Football League"), also known as the SOMPO WE League (SOMPO WEリーグ, SOMPO WE Rīgu) for sponsorship reasons, is the top flight of women's association football in Japan, starting from the 2021–22 season. It is the first fully-professional women's football league in Japan.

The current (2024–25) title holders are Tokyo Verdy Beleza.

== History ==
On 3 June 2020, the Japan Football Association (JFA) announced the formation of the WE League to become Japan's new top-flight, professional women's football league. The semi-professional Nadeshiko League would become the second level on the women's football pyramid in Japan once the WE League began play in the autumn of 2021. United States–based business executive and former Japan international footballer Kikuko Okajima was announced as the WE League's inaugural chairwoman.

17 clubs applied to join the WE League. On 15 October 2020, 11 clubs were announced as founding members of the WE League, including seven with J. League affiliations.

- From Nadeshiko League First Division: Urawa Red Diamonds Ladies, INAC Kobe Leonessa, Tokyo Verdy Beleza, Albirex Niigata Ladies, JEF United Ichihara Chiba Ladies, Mynavi Vegalta Sendai (disaffiliated from male club Vegalta Sendai before the opening season), Nojima Stella Kanagawa Sagamihara
- From Nadeshiko League Second Division: Chifure AS Elfen Saitama, AC Nagano Parceiro Ladies, FC Jumonji Ventus (affiliated to male club Omiya Ardija)
- Ex-novo franchise: Sanfrecce Hiroshima Regina.

In the 2023–24 season, Cerezo Osaka Sakai Ladies entered the WE League, promoted from Nadeshiko League Division 1.

== Competition format ==
The WE League's 2023–24 season features 12 teams playing a double round-robin, home-and-away competition. Unlike the Nadeshiko League, the WE League will play a winter season that conforms with most European leagues. There will be no relegation from the WE League to the Nadeshiko League, but teams may be promoted from the latter in the first several seasons for the WE League to reach a desired number of teams.

Each team in the WE League must have at least 15 players signed to fully professional contracts, which are not subject to a salary cap. In addition to bringing professionalism to Japanese women's football, the WE League also implemented measures to bringing in international players. The JFA subsidizes salaries for players from Southeast Asian member federations, while the league itself subsidizes players from top-ranked FIFA countries. The league actively recruits players from top-ranked federations such as France, Germany, the Netherlands, the United States and Spain, and it also provides additional subsidies to encourage internationalization for expenses such as interpreters.

== Clubs ==
=== 2025–26 season ===
The following 12 clubs competed in the WE League in the 2025–26 season.

Club	Position in the 2024–25 season	First season in top division	First season in WE League	First season of current spell in top division	Top division titles	Most recent top division title
AC Nagano Parceiro	8	2003	2021–22	2021–22	0	—
Albirex Niigata	4	2007	2021–22	2007	0	—
AS Elfen Saitama	6	2002	2021–22	2021–22	0	—
Cerezo Osaka Yanmar	7	2018	2023–24	2023–24	0	—
INAC Kobe Leonessa	2	2006	2021–22	2006	4	2021–22
JEF United Chiba	9	2000	2021–22	2009	0	—
Mynavi Sendai	12	2013	2021–22	2013	0	—
Nojima Stella Kanagawa	10	2017	2021–22	2017	0	—
RB Omiya Ardija Women	11	2021–22	2021–22	2021–22	0	—
Sanfrecce Hiroshima Regina	5	2021–22	2021–22	2021–22	—	—
Tokyo Verdy Beleza	1	1989	2021–22	1989	18	2024–25
Urawa Red Diamonds	3	1999	2021–22	1999	5	2022–23

Locations of WE League clubs
Locations of WE League clubs in and near Tokyo

== List of winners ==
Year	Champions (number of titles)	Runners-up	Third place	Leading goalscorer	Goals
2021–22	INAC Kobe Leonessa	Urawa Red Diamonds Ladies	Tokyo Verdy Beleza	(Japan) Yuika Sugasawa (Urawa Red Diamonds)	14
2022–23	Urawa Red Diamonds Ladies	INAC Kobe Leonessa	Tokyo Verdy Beleza	(Japan) Riko Ueki (Tokyo Verdy Beleza)	14
2023–24	Urawa Red Diamonds Ladies (2)	INAC Kobe Leonessa	Tokyo Verdy Beleza	(Japan) Kiko Seike (Urawa Red Diamonds)	20
2024–25	Tokyo Verdy Beleza	INAC Kobe Leonessa	Urawa Red Diamonds Ladies	(Spain) Carlota Suárez (INAC Kobe Leonessa)	13
2025–26	INAC Kobe Leonessa (2)	Urawa Red Diamonds Ladies	Tokyo Verdy Beleza	(Japan) Riko Yoshida (INAC Kobe Leonessa)	16

== Sponsorship ==
=== Title Partner ===
Company	Period
Yogibo Japan (Webshark)	2021–2023
SOMPO Holdings	2024–present

=== Cup Title Partner ===
Company	Period
Kracie	2024–present

=== Gold Partner/Grassroots Partner ===
Company	Period
Daihatsu	2021–present

=== Silver Partners ===
Company	Period
Plenus	2021–2023
Asahi Kasei	2021–present
MediQttO	2021–2022
x-girl	2021–present
Persol	2021–present
TRE Holdings	2022–2023
Kracie	2023–present

=== Social Impact Partner ===
Provider	Period
KPMG	2023–present

=== Official Broadcasting Partner ===
Provider	Period
DAZN	2021–present

=== Official Media Partners ===
Provider	Period
Yomiuri Shimbun	2024–present

=== Official Equipment Partner ===
Provider	Period
Molten	2021–present

=== Official Ticketing Partner ===
Provider	Period
Pia	2021–present

== WE ACTION DAY ==
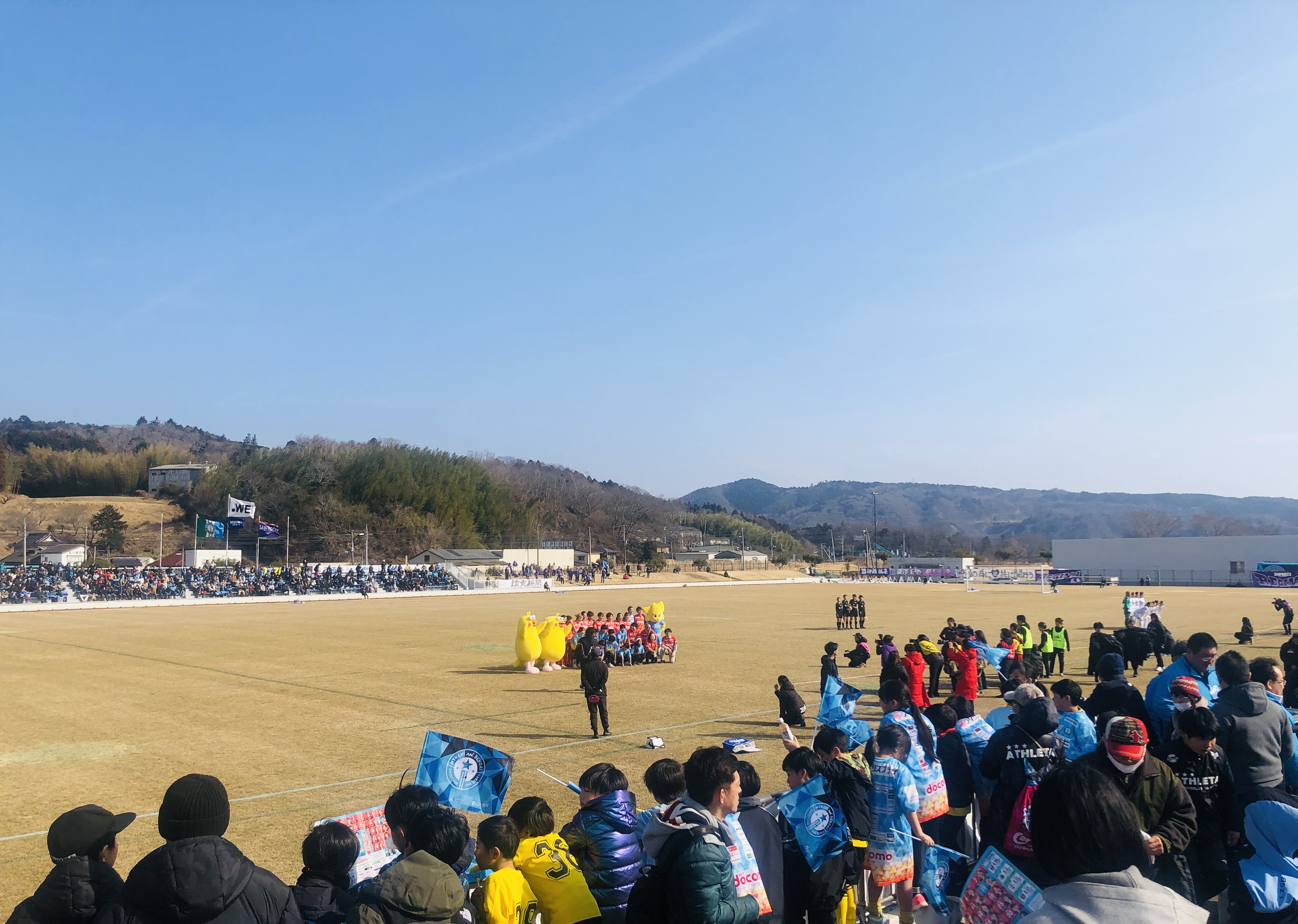
Sendai to wear special uniforms for reconstruction support match in Ishinomaki.

As the WE League comprises 11 teams in its inaugural season, there are inevitably matchdays where some teams do not play. The league has designated these days without matches as "WE ACTION DAY" and conducts initiatives to promote its core philosophy. On September 9, 2021—the league's opening season—it announced the launch of activities aimed at realizing the "inclusive society" set forth in its mission.

Furthermore, as part of their efforts to address gender-related issues and contribute to achieving the SDGs (Sustainable Development Goals), each club conducts a variety of activities, such as soccer clinics for children, participation in para-sports experience events for people with disabilities, and community volunteer work.

In addition, activities tailored to the history of each region are also being conducted. Examples include initiatives in Kobe to ensure that memories of the 1995 Great Hanshin-Awaji Earthquake do not fade, and the hosting of matches in Sendai—held in March, the month the disaster occurred—to support recovery efforts following the 2011 Great East Japan Earthquake.

== See also ==
- Japan Football Association
- Nadeshiko League (tiers 2–3)
- Empress's Cup
- WE League Cup
