= 2012 FIFA U-17 Women's World Cup squads =

This article lists the squads for the 2012 FIFA U-17 Women's World Cup held in Azerbaijan. Each competing federation was allowed a 21-player squad, which had to be submitted to FIFA.

== Group A ==
=== Azerbaijan ===
Coach: (Germany) Sissy Raith

No.	Pos.	Player	Date of birth (age)	Caps	Goals	Club
1	GK	Aytaj Sharifova	8 January 1997 (aged 15)			(Association of Football Federations of Azerbaijan) BTI
2	DF	Zhala Mahsimova	2 September 1996 (aged 16)			(Association of Football Federations of Azerbaijan) Shahdag Samur
3	MF	Zhala Mammadova	9 July 1997 (aged 15)			(Association of Football Federations of Azerbaijan) Fidan
4	DF	Laman Baghirova	6 March 1995 (aged 17)			(Association of Football Federations of Azerbaijan) Sumgayit
5	DF	Nargiz Omarova	19 February 1995 (aged 17)			(Association of Football Federations of Azerbaijan) Fidan
6	MF	Maia Dangadze	7 June 1996 (aged 16)			(Association of Football Federations of Azerbaijan) Qax
7	DF	Amina Heydarova (c)	28 February 1995 (aged 17)			(Association of Football Federations of Azerbaijan) Fidan
8	FW	Aliya Valiyeva	14 January 1995 (aged 17)			(Association of Football Federations of Azerbaijan) BTI
9	MF	Sevinj Gurbanova	12 November 1996 (aged 15)			(Swedish Football Association) Nykoping
10	MF	Nigar Jalilli	15 January 1997 (aged 15)			(Association of Football Federations of Azerbaijan) Fidan
11	DF	Shafag Nasirova	24 May 1996 (aged 16)			(Association of Football Federations of Azerbaijan) Sumgayit
12	GK	Gunay Ismayilova	8 March 1998 (aged 14)			(Association of Football Federations of Azerbaijan) Fidan
13	MF	Aysun Aliyeva	19 July 1997 (aged 15)			(Association of Football Federations of Azerbaijan) BTI
14	DF	Suheyla Iltar	17 March 1997 (aged 15)			(German Football Association) Grün-Weiss Neukolin
15	DF	Kamilla Mammadova	31 August 1996 (aged 16)			(Association of Football Federations of Azerbaijan) BTI
16	FW	Melis Sarialtin	14 January 1996 (aged 16)			(German Football Association) 1. FC Köln
17	DF	Olya Shioshvili	12 February 1995 (aged 17)			(Association of Football Federations of Azerbaijan) Sumgayit
18	MF	Leila Solmaz	11 December 1995 (aged 16)			(German Football Association) VfB Stuttgart
19	FW	Susan Mansimova	9 September 1997 (aged 15)			(Association of Football Federations of Azerbaijan) BTI
20	MF	Sabrina Ronaghi	10 August 1995 (aged 17)			(German Football Association) FFC Wacker München
21	GK	Hulya Cin	8 November 1995 (aged 16)			(German Football Association) 1817 Mainz

=== Canada ===
Coach: Bryan Rosenfeld

No.	Pos.	Player	Date of birth (age)	Caps	Goals	Club
1	GK	Kailen Sheridan	16 July 1995 (aged 17)			(Canadian Soccer Association) Pickering SC
2	DF	Lindsay Agnew	31 March 1995 (aged 17)			(United States Soccer Federation) Ohio Premier Eagles
3	DF	Madeline Iozzi	5 March 1995 (aged 17)			(Canadian Soccer Association) Pickering SC
4	FW	Summer Clarke	15 September 1995 (aged 17)			(Canadian Soccer Association) Richmond Selects
5	MF	Quinn (Note: Then known as Rebecca Quinn)	11 August 1995 (aged 17)			(Canadian Soccer Association) Erin Mills SC
6	DF	Amanpreet Shergill	5 October 1995 (aged 16)			(Canadian Soccer Association) Vancouver Whitecaps
7	MF	Ashley Lawrence (c)	11 June 1995 (aged 17)			(Canadian Soccer Association) Erin Mills SC
8	FW	Jasmin Dhanda	10 September 1995 (aged 17)			(Canadian Soccer Association) Vancouver Whitecaps
9	FW	Amandine Pierre-Louis	18 February 1995 (aged 17)			(Canadian Soccer Association) Soccer St. Leonard
10	MF	Valerie Sanderson	16 March 1995 (aged 17)			(Canadian Soccer Association) FC Boisbriand
11	FW	Nichelle Prince	19 February 1995 (aged 17)			(Canadian Soccer Association) Pickering SC
12	DF	Kadeisha Buchanan	5 November 1995 (aged 16)			(Canadian Soccer Association) Erin Mills SC
13	MF	Lizzy Raben	27 April 1995 (aged 17)			(United States Soccer Federation) Colorado Rush
14	DF	Rebecca Pongetti	28 June 1995 (aged 17)			(Canadian Soccer Association) Oakville SC
15	DF	Victoria Pickett	12 August 1996 (aged 16)			(Canadian Soccer Association) Glen Shields Sun Devils
16	MF	Emily Pietrangelo	23 August 1995 (aged 17)			(Canadian Soccer Association) Erin Mills SC
17	MF	Jordyn Listro	10 August 1995 (aged 17)			(Canadian Soccer Association) Brams United
18	GK	Taylor Bucklin	17 March 1995 (aged 17)			(United States Soccer Federation) CFC United
19	DF	Nicole Loncar	19 June 1995 (aged 17)			(Canadian Soccer Association) Brams United
20	DF	Larisa Staub	15 September 1995 (aged 17)			(Canadian Soccer Association) Southwest United
21	GK	Maryse Bard-Martel	12 January 1995 (aged 17)			(Canadian Soccer Association) FC Boisbriand

=== Colombia ===
Coach: (Colombia) Fabian Taborda

No.	Pos.	Player	Date of birth (age)	Caps	Goals	Club
1	GK	Lissa Cardoza	4 September 1995 (aged 17)			(Colombian Football Federation) CD Generaciones Palmiranas
2	DF	Diana Duarte	5 October 1995 (aged 16)			(Colombian Football Federation) Club Gol Star
3	DF	Ana Elena Verdeza	10 July 1995 (aged 17)			(Colombian Football Federation) Elite
4	MF	Estefanía Botero	14 March 1995 (aged 17)			(Colombian Football Federation) Club Molino Viejo
5	DF	Mariandrea Otero	31 May 1995 (aged 17)			(Colombian Football Federation) Club Gol Star
6	FW	Dayana Castillo (c)	1 May 1996 (aged 16)			(Colombian Football Federation) Elite
7	MF	Daniela Tamayo	26 September 1995 (aged 16)			(Colombian Football Federation) Nacional
8	MF	Carolina Arbeláez	8 March 1995 (aged 17)			(Colombian Football Federation) CD Formas Íntimas
9	FW	Pamela Peñaloza	5 December 1996 (aged 15)			(Colombian Football Federation) Club Cota
10	MF	Leicy Santos	16 May 1996 (aged 16)			(Colombian Football Federation) Club Besser
11	FW	Nicole Regnier	28 February 1995 (aged 17)			(Mexican Football Federation) Atlas
12	GK	Angie Mina	6 February 1996 (aged 16)			(Colombian Football Federation) CD Sarmiento Lora
13	MF	Laura Aguirre	10 January 1996 (aged 16)			(Colombian Football Federation) CD Formas Íntimas
14	FW	Juliana Ocampo	15 May 1996 (aged 16)			(Colombian Football Federation) Club Gol Star
15	DF	María Jaramillo	10 February 1996 (aged 16)			(United States Soccer Federation) Michigan Gators
16	MF	Anyella Martínez	23 February 1995 (aged 17)			(Colombian Football Federation) City Futbol
17	MF	Maria Villa	31 December 1995 (aged 16)			(Colombian Football Federation) Talentos Caldas
18	FW	Gabriela Maldonado	25 November 1996 (aged 15)			(Colombian Football Federation) Club Gol Star
19	MF	Marcela Restrepo	10 November 1995 (aged 16)			(Colombian Football Federation) CD Generaciones Palmiranas
20	MF	Karen Gutiérrez	8 October 1995 (aged 16)			(Colombian Football Federation) El Popular
21	GK	Valentina Tabares	2 April 1995 (aged 17)			(Colombian Football Federation) Talentos Caldas

=== Nigeria ===
Coach: Peter Dedevbo

No.	Pos.	Player	Date of birth (age)	Caps	Goals	Club
1	GK	Gift Andy	10 April 1995 (aged 17)			(Nigeria Football Federation) Nasarawa Amazons
2	DF	Sarah Nnodim	25 December 1995 (aged 16)			(Nigeria Football Federation) Adamawa Queens
3	DF	Hauwa Abdullahi	4 November 1996 (aged 15)			(Nigeria Football Federation) FCT Queens
4	MF	Oluchi Ofoegbu	20 July 1995 (aged 17)			(Nigeria Football Federation) Pelican Stars
5	DF	Ugochi Emenayo	20 December 1997 (aged 14)			(Nigeria Football Federation) Nasarawa Amazons
6	MF	Ihuoma Onyebuchi	10 December 1997 (aged 14)			(Nigeria Football Federation) Rivers Angels
7	MF	Chidinma Edeji	15 December 1995 (aged 16)			(Nigeria Football Federation) Bayelsa Queens
8	MF	Joy Bokiri	29 December 1998 (aged 13)			(Nigeria Football Federation) Bayelsa Queens
9	FW	Aminat Yakubu	25 December 1997 (aged 14)			(Nigeria Football Federation) Robo
10	MF	Tessy Biahwo	15 November 1997 (aged 14)			(Nigeria Football Federation) Kogi Cone
11	FW	Yetunde Adeboyejo	25 May 1996 (aged 16)			(Nigeria Football Federation) Inneh Queens
12	GK	Sandra Chiichii	10 October 1997 (aged 14)			(Nigeria Football Federation) Ibom Angels
13	FW	Mabel Effiom	10 June 1995 (aged 17)			(Nigeria Football Federation) Ibom Angels
14	FW	Halimatu Ayinde	16 May 1995 (aged 17)			(Nigeria Football Federation) Amazons Queens
15	DF	Victoria Aidelomon (c)	11 December 1995 (aged 16)			(Nigeria Football Federation) Pelican Stars
16	FW	Jiroro Idike	7 June 1996 (aged 16)			(Nigeria Football Federation) Delta Queens
17	DF	Iheoma Amos	7 July 1996 (aged 16)			(Nigeria Football Federation) Inneh Queens
18	DF	Ebere Okoye	3 December 1995 (aged 16)			(Nigeria Football Federation) Inneh Queens
19	FW	Chinwendu Ihezuo	30 April 1997 (aged 15)			(Nigeria Football Federation) Pelican Stars
20	MF	Eluemunor Ijeh	29 November 1997 (aged 14)			(Nigeria Football Federation) Delta Queens
21	GK	Rita Obeni	19 November 1996 (aged 15)			(Nigeria Football Federation) Kogi Confluence

== Group B ==
=== France ===
Coach: Guy Ferrier

No.	Pos.	Player	Date of birth (age)	Caps	Goals	Club
1	GK	Romane Bruneau	27 August 1996 (aged 16)			(French Football Federation) ESOF Vendée La Roche-sur-Yon
2	DF	Amandine Blanc	5 March 1996 (aged 16)			(French Football Federation) FCF Monteux-Vaucluse
3	MF	Ophelie Gahery	15 March 1995 (aged 17)			(French Football Federation) Le Mans FC
4	MF	Aïssatou Tounkara	16 March 1995 (aged 17)			(French Football Federation) FCF Juvisy
5	DF	Griedge Mbock Bathy	26 February 1995 (aged 17)			(French Football Federation) EA Guingamp
6	MF	Candice Gherbi	5 September 1995 (aged 17)			(French Football Federation) AS Saint-Etienne
7	FW	Léa Declercq	12 May 1995 (aged 17)			(French Football Federation) FCF Hénin-Beaumont
8	MF	Laura Blanchard	3 August 1995 (aged 17)			(French Football Federation) Dijon FCO
9	FW	Kadidiatou Diani	1 April 1995 (aged 17)			(French Football Federation) FCF Juvisy
10	MF	Sandie Toletti (c)	13 July 1995 (aged 17)			(French Football Federation) Montpellier HSC
11	FW	Pauline Cousin	4 February 1995 (aged 17)			(French Football Federation) FCF Henin-Beaumont
12	FW	Laurie Saulnier	8 May 1995 (aged 17)			(French Football Federation) FCF Monteux-Vaucluse
13	DF	Marion Romanelli	24 July 1996 (aged 16)			(French Football Federation) FCF Monteux-Vaucluse
14	MF	Ghoutia Karchouni	29 May 1995 (aged 17)			(French Football Federation) Olympique Lyonnais
15	DF	Noémie Carage	9 September 1996 (aged 16)			(French Football Federation) Olympique Lyonnais
16	GK	Claire Jacob	3 May 1996 (aged 16)			(French Football Federation) Arras FCF
17	MF	Alexandra Atamaniuk	11 June 1995 (aged 17)			(French Football Federation) FC Vendenheim
18	MF	Grace Geyoro	2 July 1997 (aged 15)			(French Football Federation) Paris Saint-Germain
19	MF	Juliane Gathrat	24 August 1996 (aged 16)			(French Football Federation) AS Algrange
20	MF	Delphine Cascarino	5 February 1997 (aged 15)			(French Football Federation) Olympique Lyonnais
21	GK	Cindy Perrault	26 January 1996 (aged 16)			(French Football Federation) Olympique Lyonnais

=== Gambia ===
Coach: Buba Jallow

No.	Pos.	Player	Date of birth (age)	Caps	Goals	Club
1	GK	Aminata Gaye	3 March 1996 (aged 16)			(Gambia Football Federation) Interior
2	DF	Amie Jarju (c)	15 September 1996 (aged 16)			(Gambia Football Federation) Interior
3	DF	Anna Nyassi	12 April 1996 (aged 16)			(Gambia Football Federation) Armed Forces
4	DF	Mariama Bojang	3 October 1997 (aged 14)			(Gambia Football Federation) Red Scorpions
5	MF	Binta Colley	11 October 1997 (aged 14)			(Gambia Football Federation) Abuko Utd.
6	MF	Ndey Beyai	22 November 1996 (aged 15)			(Gambia Football Federation) Abuko Utd.
7	MF	Fatou Darboe	29 November 1997 (aged 14)			(Gambia Football Federation) Interior
8	FW	Penda Bah	17 August 1998 (aged 14)			(Gambia Football Federation) Makasutu
9	MF	Sainey Sissohore	30 December 1998 (aged 13)			(Gambia Football Federation) Abuko Utd.
10	FW	Adama Tamba	29 August 1998 (aged 14)			(Gambia Football Federation) Red Scorpions
11	DF	Awa Tamba	29 August 1998 (aged 14)			(Gambia Football Federation) Red Scorpions
12	FW	Awa Demba	9 August 1997 (aged 15)			(Gambia Football Federation) Interior
13	MF	Maria Camara	1 October 1997 (aged 14)			(Gambia Football Federation) Red Scorpions
14	MF	Veronic Malack	25 December 1997 (aged 14)			(Gambia Football Federation) Interior
15	MF	Fatoumata Gibba	21 July 1996 (aged 16)			(Gambia Football Federation) Armed Forces
16	DF	Serreh Jatta	12 March 1997 (aged 15)			(Gambia Football Federation) Interior
17	DF	Fatou Fatty	11 November 1997 (aged 14)			(Gambia Football Federation) Red Scorpions
18	GK	Mariama Ceesay	22 January 1998 (aged 14)			(Gambia Football Federation) Red Scorpions
19	MF	Metta Sanneh	10 February 1998 (aged 14)			(Gambia Football Federation) Makasutu
20	FW	Isatou Jallow	10 October 1997 (aged 14)			(Gambia Football Federation) Interior
21	GK	Fatim Jawara	10 March 1997 (aged 15)			(Gambia Football Federation) Red Scorpions

=== North Korea ===
Coach: Hwang Yong Bong

No.	Pos.	Player	Date of birth (age)	Caps	Goals	Club
1	GK	Jang Yong-sim	22 July 1995 (aged 17)			(DPR Korea Football Association) Wolmido
2	DF	Kim Un-i	2 January 1996 (aged 16)			(DPR Korea Football Association) Amrokgang
3	DF	Pak Sun-gyong	14 March 1996 (aged 16)			(DPR Korea Football Association) Pyongyang City
4	DF	Choe Sol-gyong	14 September 1996 (aged 16)			(DPR Korea Football Association) Rimyongsu
5	MF	Kim Hyang-ran	22 January 1995 (aged 17)			(DPR Korea Football Association) April 25
6	DF	Kim Hyang-mi	1 September 1995 (aged 17)			(DPR Korea Football Association) Kalmaegi
7	MF	Choe Yun-gyong	29 October 1995 (aged 16)			(DPR Korea Football Association) April 25
8	MF	Choe Hyang-mi	22 March 1995 (aged 17)			(DPR Korea Football Association) Rimyongsu
9	MF	Ri Hyang-sim	23 March 1996 (aged 16)			(DPR Korea Football Association) Amrokgang
10	FW	Ri Un-sim	20 May 1996 (aged 16)			(DPR Korea Football Association) April 25
11	MF	Kim Phyong-hwa	28 November 1996 (aged 15)			(DPR Korea Football Association) Hwangryongsan
12	DF	Jon So-yon	25 July 1996 (aged 16)			(DPR Korea Football Association) April 25
13	FW	Jo Ryon-hwa	13 January 1996 (aged 16)			(DPR Korea Football Association) Wolmido
14	MF	Ri Kum-suk	7 December 1995 (aged 16)			(DPR Korea Football Association) Sobaeksu
15	MF	Choe Chung-bok (c)	3 July 1996 (aged 16)			(DPR Korea Football Association) April 25
16	MF	Ri Un-yong	1 September 1996 (aged 16)			(DPR Korea Football Association) Sobaeksu
17	MF	Kim Un-hwa	28 August 1996 (aged 16)			(DPR Korea Football Association) Mangyongbong
18	GK	Rim Yong-hwa	20 January 1996 (aged 16)			(DPR Korea Football Association) Sobaeksu
19	FW	Ri Kyong-hyang	10 June 1996 (aged 16)			(DPR Korea Football Association) April 25
20	FW	Kim So-hyang	2 January 1996 (aged 16)			(DPR Korea Football Association) Sobaeksu
21	GK	Jong Un-ha	23 February 1996 (aged 16)			(DPR Korea Football Association) Amrokgang

=== United States ===
Coach: Albertin Montoya

No.	Pos.	Player	Date of birth (age)	Caps	Goals	Club
1	GK	Jane Campbell	17 February 1995 (aged 17)			(United States Soccer Federation) Concorde Fire South
2	FW	Emily Bruder	18 February 1995 (aged 17)			(United States Soccer Federation) Utah Avalanche
3	DF	Brittany Basinger	30 June 1995 (aged 17)			(United States Soccer Federation) FC Virginia
4	MF	Joanna Boyles	13 November 1995 (aged 16)			(United States Soccer Federation) Chelsea Ladies
5	DF	Maddie Bauer	20 March 1995 (aged 17)			(United States Soccer Federation) Slammers FC
6	FW	Summer Green	2 May 1995 (aged 17)			(United States Soccer Federation) Michigan Hawks
7	DF	Gabbi Miranda	27 September 1995 (aged 16)			(United States Soccer Federation) Colorado Rush
8	FW	Amber Munerlyn	15 January 1995 (aged 17)			(United States Soccer Federation) So Cal Blues
9	MF	Lauren Kaskie	18 September 1995 (aged 17)			(United States Soccer Federation) Heat FC
10	MF	Morgan Andrews (c)	25 March 1995 (aged 17)			(United States Soccer Federation) FC Stars of Mass
11	MF	Toni Payne	22 April 1995 (aged 17)			(United States Soccer Federation) Concorde Fire
12	DF	Mandy Freeman	23 March 1995 (aged 17)			(United States Soccer Federation) Coral Springs Utd.
13	DF	Lizzy Raben	27 April 1995 (aged 17)			(United States Soccer Federation) Colorado Rush
14	DF	Morgan Reid	13 June 1995 (aged 17)			(United States Soccer Federation) Chelsea Ladies
15	DF	Claire Wagner	15 July 1995 (aged 17)			(United States Soccer Federation) Chelsea Ladies
16	MF	Morgan Stanton	2 April 1995 (aged 17)			(United States Soccer Federation) Colorado Rush
17	MF	Andi Sullivan	20 December 1995 (aged 16)			(United States Soccer Federation) Bethesda SC
18	GK	Cassie Miller	28 April 1995 (aged 17)			(United States Soccer Federation) Sereno FC
19	FW	Margaret Purce	18 September 1995 (aged 17)			(United States Soccer Federation) Freestate Soccer
20	GK	Morgan Stearns	19 January 1995 (aged 17)			(United States Soccer Federation) McLean MPS Power
21	FW	Darian Jenkins	5 January 1995 (aged 17)			(United States Soccer Federation) Sparta SC

== Group C ==
=== Mexico ===
Coach: Christopher Cuéllar

No.	Pos.	Player	Date of birth (age)	Caps	Goals	Club
1	GK	Ana Gabriela Paz	21 December 1995 (aged 16)			(Mexican Football Federation) ITESM Guadalajara
2	DF	Jaqueline Rodríguez	7 September 1996 (aged 16)			(Mexican Football Federation) CEFOR Tequixquiac
3	DF	Jessica Valadez	24 November 1995 (aged 16)			(United States Soccer Federation) Camarillo Eagles
4	DF	Jocelyn Orejel	14 November 1996 (aged 15)			(United States Soccer Federation) So Cal Blues
5	DF	Paulina Solís	13 March 1996 (aged 16)			(Mexican Football Federation) Colegio Once
6	MF	Karla Nieto	9 January 1995 (aged 17)			(Mexican Football Federation) Galeana Morelos
7	FW	Taylor Alvarado	1 March 1995 (aged 17)			(United States Soccer Federation) Camarillo Eagles
8	MF	Greta Espinoza	5 June 1995 (aged 17)			(Mexican Football Federation) Juventus Femenil Tijuana
9	FW	Luz Duarte	29 August 1995 (aged 17)			(United States Soccer Federation) Lady Jaguars
10	MF	Cynthia Pineda	4 February 1995 (aged 17)			(United States Soccer Federation) Sockers
11	FW	Samantha Arellano	21 August 1995 (aged 17)			(United States Soccer Federation) San Diego Utd
12	GK	Esthefanny Barreras	2 November 1996 (aged 15)			(United States Soccer Federation) Sereno
13	DF	Paola Urbieta	16 February 1995 (aged 17)			(Mexican Football Federation) CEDEFUT Auriazules
14	DF	María Fernanda Pérez	12 January 1995 (aged 17)			(Mexican Football Federation) Colegio Once
15	MF	Mariana Cadena	13 February 1995 (aged 17)			(Mexican Football Federation) ITESM Monterrey
16	MF	Michelle González	20 July 1995 (aged 17)			(Mexican Football Federation) PUMAS UNAM
17	MF	Natalie Rivas	11 January 1995 (aged 17)			(United States Soccer Federation) Real So Cal
18	FW	Hallie Hernandez	8 September 1995 (aged 17)			(United States Soccer Federation) LA Blues
19	FW	Gabriela Álvarez	21 February 1996 (aged 16)			(Mexican Football Federation) Atletico Cora
20	FW	Jenny Chiu	25 September 1995 (aged 16)			(United States Soccer Federation) El Paso Galaxy
21	GK	Adela Meza	5 January 1996 (aged 16)			(Mexican Football Federation) CEFOR Jaguares

=== New Zealand ===
Coach: (New Zealand) Paul Temple

No.	Pos.	Player	Date of birth (age)	Caps	Goals	Club
1	GK	Lily Alfeld	4 August 1995 (aged 17)			(New Zealand Football) Coastal Spirit FC
2	DF	Meikayla Moore	4 June 1996 (aged 16)			(New Zealand Football) Coastal Spirit FC
3	DF	Laura Merrin	12 August 1995 (aged 17)			(New Zealand Football) Coastal Spirit FC
4	DF	Catherine Bott	22 April 1995 (aged 17)			(New Zealand Football) Lynn-Avon United
5	DF	Emily Jensen	22 August 1995 (aged 17)			(New Zealand Football) Three Kings United
6	MF	Hannah Carlsen	25 November 1995 (aged 16)			(New Zealand Football) Forrest Hill Milford
7	FW	Jasmine Pereira	20 July 1996 (aged 16)			(New Zealand Football) Three Kings United
8	MF	Daisy Cleverley	30 April 1997 (aged 15)			(New Zealand Football) Lynn-Avon United
9	FW	Martine Puketapu	16 September 1997 (aged 15)			(New Zealand Football) Three Kings United
10	MF	Emma Fletcher	4 February 1995 (aged 17)			(Canadian Soccer Association) Vancouver Whitecaps FC
11	FW	Briar Palmer	1 July 1995 (aged 17)			(New Zealand Football) Waterside Karori AFC
12	DF	Megan Robertson	1 August 1995 (aged 17)			(New Zealand Football) Waterside Karori AFC
13	DF	Megan Lee	7 February 1995 (aged 17)			(United States Soccer Federation) LSU Tigers
14	MF	Jessica Innes	5 June 1995 (aged 17)			(New Zealand Football) Glenfield Rovers
15	FW	Lauren Dabner	4 January 1996 (aged 16)			(New Zealand Football) Coastal Spirit FC
16	GK	Ronisa Lipi	27 August 1995 (aged 17)			(New Zealand Football) Waterside Karori AFC
17	FW	Emily Oosterhof	10 February 1997 (aged 15)			(New Zealand Football) Glenfield Rovers
18	FW	Emma Rolston	10 November 1996 (aged 15)			(New Zealand Football) Waterside Karori AFC
19	FW	Tayla Christensen	31 August 1997 (aged 15)			(New Zealand Football) Melville United
20	GK	Emma Taylor	5 October 1995 (aged 16)			(New Zealand Football) Glenfield Rovers
21	DF	Courteney van Lieshout	11 December 1995 (aged 16)			(New Zealand Football) Pukekohe AFC

=== Brazil ===
Coach: Edvaldo Erlacher

No.	Pos.	Player	Date of birth (age)	Caps	Goals	Club
1	GK	Nicole	14 August 1995 (aged 17)			(Brazilian Football Confederation) Botafogo
2	DF	Julia Bianchi	7 October 1997 (aged 14)			(Brazilian Football Confederation) Kindermann
3	MF	Andressa	23 April 1995 (aged 17)			(Brazilian Football Confederation) Assaí
4	DF	Carol Gomes	22 June 1995 (aged 17)			(Brazilian Football Confederation) Porto Alegre
5	MF	Camila	29 July 1995 (aged 17)			(Brazilian Football Confederation) São José
6	DF	Letícia Albuquerque	24 May 1995 (aged 17)			(Brazilian Football Confederation) Kindermann
7	MF	Mayara Vaz	22 April 1995 (aged 17)			(Brazilian Football Confederation) ESMAC
8	MF	Djeni	25 June 1995 (aged 17)			(Brazilian Football Confederation) Kindermann
9	FW	Byanca Brasil	23 November 1995 (aged 16)			(Brazilian Football Confederation) Vasco da Gama
10	MF	Andressa (c)	1 May 1995 (aged 17)			(Brazilian Football Confederation) Kindermann
11	MF	Gaby Soares	24 July 1995 (aged 17)			(Brazilian Football Confederation) Vasco da Gama
12	GK	Tainá	1 May 1995 (aged 17)			(Brazilian Football Confederation) Centro Olímpico
13	FW	Mônica	7 August 1996 (aged 16)			(Brazilian Football Confederation) Kindermann
14	FW	Maxinny	3 February 1995 (aged 17)			(Brazilian Football Confederation) Búzios
15	MF	Chaiane Locatelli	20 February 1995 (aged 17)			(Brazilian Football Confederation) Kindermann
16	DF	Natane Locatelli	20 February 1995 (aged 17)			(Brazilian Football Confederation) Kindermann
17	DF	Ana Clara	21 May 1995 (aged 17)			(Brazilian Football Confederation) Vasco da Gama
18	FW	Gabi Portilho	18 July 1995 (aged 17)			(Brazilian Football Confederation) Kindermann
19	FW	Jenyffer Leonela	28 March 1995 (aged 17)			(Brazilian Football Confederation) Vitória das Tabocas
20	MF	Brena	28 October 1996 (aged 15)			(Brazilian Football Confederation) Vasco da Gama
21	GK	Ana Beatriz	25 April 1996 (aged 16)			(Brazilian Football Confederation) Vasco da Gama

=== Japan ===
Coach: Hiroshi Yoshida

No.	Pos.	Player	Date of birth (age)	Caps	Goals	Club
1	GK	Nene Inoue	28 June 1995 (aged 17)			(Japan Football Association) JFA Academy Fukushima
2	DF	Saki Ishii	3 July 1995 (aged 17)			(Japan Football Association) Urawa Red Diamonds Ladies
3	DF	Shiori Miyake	13 October 1995 (aged 16)			(Japan Football Association) JFA Academy Fukushima
4	DF	Ruka Norimatsu	30 January 1996 (aged 16)			(Japan Football Association) JFA Academy Fukushima
5	DF	Miho Manya	5 November 1996 (aged 15)			(Japan Football Association) Hinomoto Gakuen H.S.
6	MF	Mizuki Nakamura	15 August 1995 (aged 17)			(Japan Football Association) Urawa Red Diamonds Ladies
7	MF	Hina Sugita	31 January 1997 (aged 15)			(Japan Football Association) Fujieda Junshin H.S.
8	MF	Miki Ito	10 September 1995 (aged 17)			(Japan Football Association) Tokiwagi Gakuen H.S
9	MF	Yui Narumiya	22 February 1995 (aged 17)			(Japan Football Association) JFA Academy Fukushima
10	FW	Rika Masuya	14 September 1995 (aged 17)			(Japan Football Association) JFA Academy Fukushima
11	MF	Rin Sumida	12 January 1996 (aged 16)			(Japan Football Association) NTV Beleza
12	GK	Chika Hirao	31 December 1996 (aged 15)			(Japan Football Association) JFA Academy Fukushima
13	DF	Risa Shimizu	15 June 1996 (aged 16)			(Japan Football Association) NTV Menina
14	DF	Arisa Matsubara	1 May 1995 (aged 17)			(Japan Football Association) Daishō Gakuen H.S.
15	DF	Miku Kojima	30 August 1996 (aged 16)			(Japan Football Association) JFA Academy Fukushima
16	MF	Ayaka Inoue	15 January 1995 (aged 17)			(Japan Football Association) Kawachi SC Juvenile
17	MF	Yui Hasegawa	29 January 1997 (aged 15)			(Japan Football Association) NTV Menina
18	MF	Yuka Momiki	9 April 1996 (aged 16)			(Japan Football Association) NTV Beleza
19	MF	Ayaka Nishikawa	2 April 1996 (aged 16)			(Japan Football Association) Tokiwagi Gakuen H.S
20	FW	Akari Shiraki	4 November 1996 (aged 15)			(Japan Football Association) Tokiwagi Gakuen H.S
21	GK	Eri Otaka	10 May 1995 (aged 17)			(Japan Football Association) Hinomoto Gakuen H.S.

== Group D ==
=== Uruguay ===
Coach: Graciela Rebollo

No.	Pos.	Player	Date of birth (age)	Caps	Goals	Club
1	GK	Anabel Ubal	24 December 1995 (aged 16)			(Uruguayan Football Association) Racing
2	DF	Nicole Arámbulo	26 July 1995 (aged 17)			(Uruguayan Football Association) Colón
3	DF	Karen Acosta	13 October 1995 (aged 16)			(Uruguayan Football Association) San Miguel
4	DF	Carina Felipe	3 March 1998 (aged 14)			(Uruguayan Football Association) Nacional
5	MF	Agustina Arámbulo	24 June 1998 (aged 14)			(Uruguayan Football Association) Colón
6	MF	Yamila del Puerto	19 November 1996 (aged 15)			(Uruguayan Football Association) Cerro
7	FW	Keisy Silveira	12 November 1995 (aged 16)			(Uruguayan Football Association) Nacional
8	MF	María González	29 October 1995 (aged 16)			(Uruguayan Football Association) Colón
9	MF	Pamela González	28 September 1995 (aged 16)			(Uruguayan Football Association) Colón
10	MF	Carolina Birizamberri	9 July 1995 (aged 17)			(Uruguayan Football Association) Bella Vista
11	FW	Yamila Badell	1 March 1996 (aged 16)			(Uruguayan Football Association) Colón
12	GK	Valentina Rodríguez	7 September 1995 (aged 17)			(Uruguayan Football Association) Colón
13	FW	Jemina Rolfo	20 February 1995 (aged 17)			(Uruguayan Football Association) Montevideo Wanderers
14	MF	Stephanie Tregartten	13 October 1997 (aged 14)			(Uruguayan Football Association) Iasa Paysandú
15	DF	Gisella Dell'Oca	26 July 1995 (aged 17)			(Uruguayan Football Association) Montevideo Wanderers
16	DF	Romina Soravilla	28 May 1996 (aged 16)			(Uruguayan Football Association) Nacional
17	MF	Sabrina Soravilla	28 May 1996 (aged 16)			(Uruguayan Football Association) Nacional
18	MF	Antonella Larrica	11 October 1995 (aged 16)			(Uruguayan Football Association) Colón
19	FW	Lucía Cappelletti	28 May 1996 (aged 16)			(Uruguayan Football Association) Nacional
20	MF	Alaides Bonilla	27 May 1996 (aged 16)			(Uruguayan Football Association) Nacional
21	GK	Gabriela González	10 May 1995 (aged 17)			(Uruguayan Football Association) Juventud Colonia

=== China PR ===
Coach: Zhang Chonglai

No.	Pos.	Player	Date of birth (age)	Caps	Goals	Club
1	GK	Li Mengyu	6 June 1995 (aged 17)			(Chinese Football Association) Henan Steel
2	DF	Zhang Xin	20 November 1995 (aged 16)			(Chinese Football Association) Dalian Shide
3	DF	Jiang Tingting (c)	17 April 1995 (aged 17)			(Chinese Football Association) Henan Steel
4	DF	Wang Xi	23 January 1997 (aged 15)			(Chinese Football Association) Shandong Huangming
5	DF	Song Yuqing	2 March 1995 (aged 17)			(Chinese Football Association) Dalian Shide
6	MF	Xiao Yuyi	10 January 1996 (aged 16)			(Chinese Football Association) Shanghai Women
7	MF	Liu Yanqiu	31 December 1995 (aged 16)			(Chinese Football Association) Wuhan Jiangda University
8	MF	Lei Jiahui	22 September 1995 (aged 17)			(Chinese Football Association) Henan Steel
9	FW	Zhang Chen	11 October 1995 (aged 16)			(Chinese Football Association) Beijing Baxy
10	FW	Song Duan	2 August 1995 (aged 17)			(Chinese Football Association) Dalian Shide
11	MF	Zhang Zhu	20 May 1996 (aged 16)			(Chinese Football Association) Beijing Baxy
12	DF	Chen Pingping	4 September 1995 (aged 17)			(Chinese Football Association) Guangdong Haiyin
13	FW	Li Mengwen	28 March 1995 (aged 17)			(Chinese Football Association) Jiangsu Huatai
14	DF	Wang Xuan	2 July 1996 (aged 16)			(Chinese Football Association) Shandong Huangming
15	MF	Miao Siwen	24 January 1995 (aged 17)			(Chinese Football Association) Shanghai Women
16	FW	Tang Jiali	16 March 1995 (aged 17)			(Chinese Football Association) Shanghai Women
17	FW	Dong Jiabao	21 November 1996 (aged 15)			(Chinese Football Association) Henan Steel
18	GK	Lu Feifei	10 November 1995 (aged 16)			(Chinese Football Association) Jiangsu Huatai
19	MF	Ji Xinyi	16 June 1996 (aged 16)			(Chinese Football Association) Beijing Baxy
20	MF	Lyu Yueyun	13 November 1995 (aged 16)			(Chinese Football Association) Wuhan Jiangda University
21	GK	Wang Xin	28 August 1995 (aged 17)			(Chinese Football Association) Shaanxi

=== Ghana ===
Coach: Mas-Ud Didi Dramani

No.	Pos.	Player	Date of birth (age)	Caps	Goals	Club
1	GK	Sawude Issah	24 November 1995 (aged 16)			(Ghana Football Association) Hasaacas Ladies
2	DF	Naomi Anima	18 May 1998 (aged 14)			(Ghana Football Association) Ash Town Ladies
3	FW	Jane Ayiyem	19 October 1997 (aged 14)			(Ghana Football Association) Ash Town Ladies
4	MF	Rasheda Abdul-Rahman	28 November 1996 (aged 15)			(Ghana Football Association) Lepo Stars Ladies
5	FW	Lily Niber-Lawrence	23 June 1997 (aged 15)			(Ghana Football Association) Hasaacas Ladies
6	DF	Ellen Coleman	11 December 1995 (aged 16)			(Ghana Football Association) Ghatel Ladies Accra
7	FW	Sherifatu Sumaila	30 November 1996 (aged 15)			(Ghana Football Association) Lepo Stars Ladies
8	FW	Wasila Diwura-Soale	1 September 1996 (aged 16)			(Ghana Football Association) Hasaacas Ladies
9	FW	Alberta Ahialey	23 April 1997 (aged 15)			(Ghana Football Association) Ghana Post Ladies
10	MF	Gladys Neequaye	20 April 1998 (aged 14)			(Ghana Football Association) Faith Ladies
11	DF	Vida Opoku	15 December 1997 (aged 14)			(Ghana Football Association) Olympique Marseille Ladies
12	MF	Gladys Amfobea	1 July 1998 (aged 14)			(Ghana Football Association) Lepo Stars Ladies
13	MF	Samira Abdul-Rahman	28 November 1997 (aged 14)			(Ghana Football Association) Lepo Stars Ladies
14	MF	Priscilla Okyere (C)	6 June 1995 (aged 17)			(Ghana Football Association) Fabulous Ladies
15	DF	Belinda Anane	14 June 1998 (aged 14)			(Ghana Football Association) Fabulous Ladies
16	GK	Victoria Agyei	15 May 1996 (aged 16)			(Ghana Football Association) Ash Town Ladies
17	DF	Ivy Kolli	17 January 1996 (aged 16)			(Ghana Football Association) Inter Royal Ladies
18	DF	Regina Antwi	26 November 1995 (aged 16)			(Ghana Football Association) Ghatel Ladies Accra
19	FW	Laadi Issaka	11 July 1997 (aged 15)			(Ghana Football Association) Sharp Arrows Ladies
20	MF	Fatima Alhassan	13 August 1996 (aged 16)			(Ghana Football Association) Ash Town Ladies
21	GK	Azume Adams	28 December 1997 (aged 14)			(Ghana Football Association) Hasaacas Ladies

=== Germany ===
Coach: (Germany) Anouschka Bernhard

No.	Pos.	Player	Date of birth (age)	Caps	Goals	Club
1	GK	Merle Frohms	28 January 1995 (aged 17)			(German Football Association) VfL Wolfsburg
2	DF	Sarah Schulte	8 June 1995 (aged 17)			(German Football Association) SV Meppen
3	DF	Sharon Beck	22 March 1995 (aged 17)			(German Football Association) SGS Essen
4	DF	Laura Leluschko	30 October 1995 (aged 16)			(German Football Association) Bayer Leverkusen
5	DF	Lena Lückel	9 August 1995 (aged 17)			(German Football Association) FSV Gütersloh 2009
6	MF	Daria Streng	22 May 1995 (aged 17)			(German Football Association) FCR 2001 Duisburg
7	MF	Vivien Beil	12 December 1995 (aged 16)			(German Football Association) FF USV Jena
8	MF	Theresa Panfil	13 November 1995 (aged 16)			(German Football Association) 1. FFC Frankfurt
9	MF	Ricarda Kießling	23 June 1996 (aged 16)			(German Football Association) TSV 1861 Nördlingen
10	MF	Sara Däbritz	15 February 1995 (aged 17)			(German Football Association) SC Freiburg
11	MF	Manjou Wilde	19 April 1995 (aged 17)			(German Football Association) SV Werder Bremen
12	GK	Teresa Straub	10 August 1995 (aged 17)			(German Football Association) SC Freiburg
13	DF	Franziska Jaser	20 January 1996 (aged 16)			(German Football Association) TSG Thannhausen
14	DF	Wibke Meister	12 March 1995 (aged 17)			(German Football Association) 1. FFC Turbine Potsdam
15	MF	Pauline Bremer	10 April 1996 (aged 16)			(German Football Association) 1. FFC Turbine Potsdam
16	MF	Janina Meissner	22 February 1995 (aged 17)			(German Football Association) TSG 1899 Hoffenheim
17	DF	Johanna Tietge	16 April 1996 (aged 16)			(German Football Association) VfL Wolfsburg
18	FW	Venus El-Kassem	4 January 1995 (aged 17)			(German Football Association) 1. FFC Turbine Potsdam
19	DF	Marie Becker	18 May 1995 (aged 17)			(German Football Association) Holstein Kiel
20	MF	Rebecca Knaak	23 June 1996 (aged 16)			(German Football Association) SC 07 Bad Neuenahr
21	GK	Miriam Hanemann	24 March 1997 (aged 15)			(German Football Association) 1. FFC Frankfurt
