= Fatim Jawara =

Gambian footballer (1997–2016)

Personal information
- Date of birth: 13 March 1997
- Place of birth: Serekunda, The Gambia
- Date of death: 27 October 2016 (aged 19)
- Place of death: Mediterranean Sea
- Position: Goalkeeper

Senior career*
Years	Team	Apps	(Gls)
- Red Scorpions FC

International career
2012	Gambia U17		
2015–2016	Gambia		
- * Club domestic league appearances and goals

Fatim Jawara (13 March 1997 – 27 October 2016) was a Gambian footballer who played for the Gambia women's national team and top Gambian women's football club Red Scorpions FC. In 2012, she played as the substitute goalkeeper at the 2012 FIFA U-17 Women's World Cup for the under-17 national team. She died attempting to cross the Mediterranean Sea by boat to Italy in 2016.

== Club career ==
Jawara played for Gambia's top women's football club, the Red Scorpions FC, based in Serekunda. She eventually became the first choice goalkeeper for the team.

== International career ==
Jawara represented Gambia on the under-17 and senior national teams. She was called up to the Gambia women's national under-17 football team, making her debut in 2009 and went on to play at the 2012 FIFA U-17 Women's World Cup in Azerbaijan. She made her debut for the women's national football team in 2015, and saved a penalty kick in a friendly against Glasgow Girls F.C. from the Scottish Women's Football League First Division during the match.

== Death ==
In February 2016, Jawara left her homeland Serrekunda in Gambia and crossed the Sahara Desert to Libya. Once in Libya, she contacted her family and informed them that she was travelling to Europe to seek a position playing for a major European club.

At the end of October 2016, she attempted to smuggle herself into Europe by travelling with others on two boats across the Mediterranean Sea, heading towards the island of Lampedusa, Italy. Due to a severe storm, their boats sank and Jawara drowned. She was 19 years old.

Her absence was first noted when the national team was due to play Casa Sports F.C. from Senegal as part of a festival to celebrate women's football. Several days after the accident, her family was contacted by the agent to inform them that the boat had capsized, and she had drowned.

=== Reactions ===
Lamin Kaba Bajo, President of the Gambia Football Federation, said that the federation was "grieving at the moment as this is a great loss to the national soccer team and the nation." Jawara's former teammate Adama Tamba said that learning about her death was "painful". Tamba stated that Jawara was "someone very close to [her]" and that she was "always advising [her], especially in the tournament [...] in Baku in 2012".

== See also ==
- European migrant crisis
