= Sulayman Marreh =

Gambian footballer

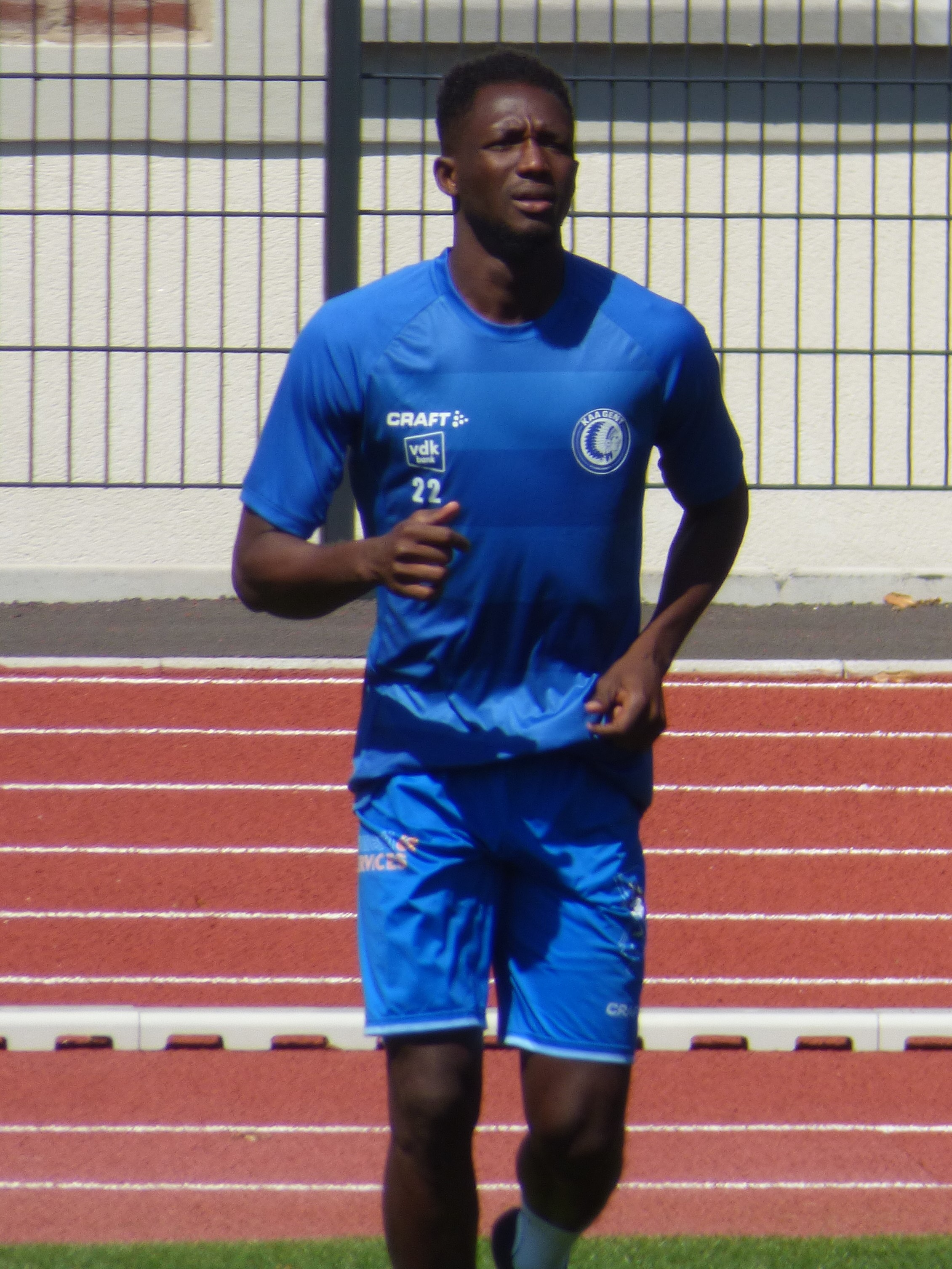
- Marreh training in 2020

Personal information
- Full name: Sulayman Marreh
- Date of birth: 15 January 1996 (age 30)
- Place of birth: Abuko, Gambia
- Height: 1.84 m (6 ft 0 in)
- Positions: Defensive midfielder; centre-back

Youth career
- Abuko United

Senior career*
Years	Team	Apps	(Gls)
2010–2011	Abuko United		
2011–2013	Samger		
2013–2017	Granada B	55	(3)
2014–2015	Granada	1	(0)
2017–2019	Watford	0	(0)
2017–2018	→ Valladolid (loan)	0	(0)
2018	→ Almería (loan)	12	(1)
2018–2019	→ Eupen (loan)	29	(1)
2019	Eupen	11	(0)
2020–2023	Gent	32	(1)
2023	Hapoel Haifa	0	(0)
2024	Železničar Pančevo	2	(0)

International career^{‡}
2011–	Gambia	34	(1)
- * Club domestic league appearances and goals as of 8 June 2023 ‡ National team caps and goals as of 12:02, 30 July 2020 (UTC)

Sulayman Marreh (born 15 January 1996) is a Gambian professional footballer who plays as a defensive midfielder or centre-back.

== Club career ==
Born in Banjul, Marreh made his senior debuts with Abuko United FC. In 2011, he was spotted by Gambia U-17's staff ahead of 2011 African U-17 Championship, and despite being left out of the final cut, he joined Samger FC. In March 2014 he moved to Granada CF in Spain, being assigned to the reserves in Segunda División B, for a reported fee of one million dalasi.

Marreh made his senior debut with the side on 15 March 2014, starting in a 0–0 draw against FC Cartagena; roughly a month later he netted his first goal abroad, scoring the first of a 6–1 home win over Écija Balompié.

On 21 March, Marreh was called up to the Andalusians' main squad ahead of the La Liga match against Elche CF; he remained on the bench in the 1–0 win at the Estadio Nuevo Los Cármenes, however. He made his first-team debut on 17 October, starting in a 0–1 home loss against Rayo Vallecano.

On 10 July 2017, after having his federative rights assigned to Watford, Marreh was loaned to Segunda División club Real Valladolid for one year. The following January, his loan with Valladolid was cancelled and he joined UD Almería on a loan deal for the remainder of the campaign.

In March 2019 Belgian First Division A club Eupen announced they had taken up the option to sign Marreh on a contract until June 2021, having initially signed him on loan for the 2018–19 season.

In February 2024, at the end of the Africa Cup of Nations, he signed with Serbian side Železničar Pančevo.

== International career ==
After being left out of the under-17 squad, Marreh made his debut with the main squad on 9 February 2011, coming on as a substitute in a 1–3 loss against Guinea-Bissau at Lisbon, Portugal. He played his first official match on 15 June of the following year, starting in a 1–4 2013 Africa Cup of Nations qualification loss against Algeria. He played in the 2021 Africa cup of Nations, his national team's first continental tournament, where they made a sensational quarter-final.

== Career statistics ==
=== Club ===
As of match played 23 August 2023

Appearances and goals by club, season and competition
Club	Season	League			National Cup (Note: Includes Copa del Rey, Belgian Cup)		Europe		Other		Total	
Club	Season	Division	Apps	Goals	Apps	Goals	Apps	Goals	Apps	Goals	Apps	Goals
Granada B	2013–14	Primera Federación	8	1	—		—		—		8	1
Granada B	2014–15	Primera Federación	14	0	—		—		—		14	0
Granada B	2015–16	Primera Federación	18	2	—		—		—		18	2
Granada B	2016–17	Primera Federación	23	1	—		—		—		23	1
Granada B	Total		63	4	—		—		—		63	4
Granada	2014–15	La Liga	1	0	1	0	—		—		2	0
Real Valladolid (loan)	2017–18	Segunda División	0	0	4	0	—		—		4	0
Almería (loan)	2017–18	Segunda División	12	1	0	0	—		—		12	1
Eupen	2018–19	Belgian Pro League	21	0	1	0	—		8 (Note: Appearance(s) in play-off)	1	30	1
Eupen	2019–20	Belgian Pro League	10	0	1	1	—		—		11	1
Eupen	Total		31	0	2	1	—		8	1	41	2
Gent	2019–20	Belgian Pro League	4	0	0	0	1 (Note: Appearance(s) in UEFA Europa League)	0	—		5	0
Gent	2020–21	Belgian Pro League	11	0	0	0	3 (Note: One appearance in UEFA Champions League, two appearances in UEFA Europa League)	0	3	0	17	0
Gent	2021–22	Belgian Pro League	1	0	2	0	1 (Note: Appearance(s) in UEFA Conference League)	0	2	0	6	0
Gent	2022–23	Belgian Pro League	10	1	1	0	5 (Note: One appearance in UEFA Europa League, four appearances in UEFA Conference League)	0	2 (Note: One appearance in Belgian Super Cup, one appearance in play-off)	0	18	1
Gent	Total		24	1	3	0	10	0	7	0	46	1
Career total			131	6	10	1	10	0	15	1	168	8

=== International ===
Appearances and goals by national team and year
National team	Year	Apps	Goals
Gambia	2011	1	0
Gambia	2012	1	0
Gambia	2013	4	0
Gambia	2015	4	0
Gambia	2017	2	0
Gambia	2018	4	0
Gambia	2019	2	1
Total		18	1

Scores and results list Gambia's goal tally first, score column indicates score after each Marreh goal.

List of international goals scored by Sulayman Marreh
No.	Date	Venue	Opponent	Score	Result	Competition
1	13 November 2019	Estádio 11 de Novembro, Luanda, Angola	Angola	3–1	3–1	2021 Africa Cup of Nations qualification
