= 2011 AFC U-16 Women's Championship =

AFC U-16 Women's Championship

Tournament details
- Host country: China
- Dates: 3–13 November
- Teams: 6 (from 1 confederation)
- Venues: 2 (in 1 host city)

Final positions
- Champions: Japan (2nd title)
- Runners-up: North Korea
- Third place: China
- Fourth place: South Korea

Tournament statistics
- Matches played: 15
- Goals scored: 54 (3.6 per match)
- Attendance: 1,624 (108 per match)
- Top scorer: (North Korea) Ri Un-sim (9 goals)
- Best player: (Japan) Yui Narumiya
- Fair play award: Thailand

The 2011 AFC U-16 Women's Championship was the fourth edition of the AFC U-16 Women's Championship. The top 3 teams qualify for the 2012 FIFA U-17 Women's World Cup.

== Venues ==
The host city was Nanjing in Jiangsu, China. The Final round was played on the following stadiums.

Nanjing
Nanjing Olympic Sports Centre	Jiangning Sports Center
Capacity: 61,443	Capacity: 30,000
2011 AFC U-16 Women's Championship is located in China

== Qualification ==
There were two qualification rounds to determine one additional place for the final round, for which five teams were automatically qualified.

	Teams entering in this round	Teams advancing from previous round	Competition format
First qualifying round (10 teams)	10 teams from lowest ranked associations	N/A	2 groups of 5 teams, hosted by one city
Second qualifying round (5 teams)	Chinese Taipei; Myanmar; Thailand	2 group winners from 1st qualifying round; Iran; Vietnam	1 groups of 5 teams, hosted by one city
Final tournament (6 teams)	South Korea (Defending champions); North Korea (2009 runners-up); Japan (2009 Third place); Australia (2009 Fourth place); China (2009 Group Stage)	1 group winner from 2nd qualifying round (Thailand)	round-robin tournament

== Final tournament ==
The final round was played as a single round-robin tournament from 3–13 November 2011.

Team	Pld	W	D	L	GF	GA	GD	Pts
Japan	5	5	0	0	18	0	+18	15
North Korea	5	4	0	1	14	1	+13	12
China	5	2	1	2	11	4	+7	7
South Korea	5	2	1	2	7	7	0	7
Australia	5	1	0	4	4	9	–5	3
Thailand	5	0	0	5	0	33	–33	0

3 November 2011
14:30

China	8–0	Thailand
Lyu Yueyun 33'; Lei Jiahui 34', 90'; Wang Yaping 51', 56'; Zhang Chen 69', 88'; Ji Xinyi 86'	Report

Jiangning Sports Center, Nanjing
Attendance: 100
Referee: Cha Sung-mi (South Korea)
3 November 2011
14:30

South Korea	4–0	Australia
Kim So-yi 19', 47'; Lim Hee-eun 35'; Namgung Yeji 90'	Report

Nanjing Olympic Sports Center, Nanjing
Attendance: 75
Referee: Sato Nami (Japan)
3 November 2011
17:30

North Korea	0–1	Japan
	Report	Norimatsu 90+2'

Jiangning Sports Center, Nanjing
Attendance: 91
Referee: Maria Piedade Rebello (India)

5 November 2011
14:30

Japan	10–0	Thailand
Inoue 23'; Itō 25'; Shiraki 35', 55'; Hirata 40'; Pannaray Suyao 46' (o.g.); Matsubara 66'; Nakamura 68', 90+1'; Toriumi 77'	Report

Nanjing Olympic Sports Center, Nanjing
Attendance: 21
Referee: Ri Hong-Sil (North Korea)
5 November 2011
14:30

Australia	0–3	China
	Report	Song Yuqing 18'; Song Duan 27', 55'

Jiangning Sports Center, Nanjing
Attendance: 150
Referee: Cha Sung-mi (South Korea)
5 November 2011
17:30

South Korea	0–4	North Korea
	Report	Ri Kyong-hyang 21', 65'; Ri Un-sim 41', 72'

Jiangning Sports Center, Nanjing
Attendance: 100
Referee: Abirami Apbai Naidu (Singapore)

7 November 2011
14:30

China	0–3	Japan
	Report	Masuya 11', 73'; Narumiya 38'

Jiangning Sports Center, Nanjing
Attendance: 80
Referee: Semaksuk Praew (Thailand)
7 November 2011
14:30

Thailand	0–3	South Korea
	Report	Namgung Ye-ji 41'; Kim So-yi 47'; Yoon Ji-hyun 70'

Jiangning Sports Center, Nanjing
Attendance: 25
Referee: Maria Piedade Rebello (India)
7 November 2011
17:30

Australia	0–1	North Korea
	Report	Ri Kyong-hyang 90'

Nanjing Olympic Sports Center, Nanjing
Attendance: 50
Referee: Nami Sato (Japan)

10 November 2011
14:30

Thailand	0–4	Australia
	Report	Jones 21', 82'; Brown 62'; Sampson 64'

Nanjing Olympic Sports Center, Nanjing
Attendance: 50
Referee: Ri Hong-sil (North Korea)
10 November 2011
14:30

North Korea	1–0	China
Kim Phyong-hwa 47'	Report

Jiangning Sports Center, Nanjing
Attendance: 125
Referee: Abirami Apbai Naidu (Singapore)
10 November 2011
17:30

Japan	3–0	South Korea
Narumiya 4'; Nakamura 13'; Masuya 30'	Report

Jiangning Sports Center, Nanjing
Attendance: 80
Referee: Wang Jia (China PR)

13 November 2011
14:30

Thailand	0–8	North Korea
	Report	Kim So-hyang 6'; Ri Un-sim 31', 43', 45+1', 46', 52', 66', 74'

Nanjing Olympic Sports Center, Nanjing
Attendance: 40
Referee: Abirami Apbai Naidu (Singapore)
13 November 2011
14:30

Australia	0–1	Japan
	Report	Momiki 16'

Jiangning Sports Center, Nanjing
Attendance: 125
Referee: Semaksuk Praew (Thailand)
13 November 2011
17:30

China	0–0	South Korea
	Report

Jiangning Sports Center, Nanjing
Attendance: 512
Referee: Nami Sato (Japan)

== Winners ==
AFC U-19 Women's Championship 2011

Japan
Second title

== Awards ==
Most Valuable Player	Top Scorer	Fair Play Award
(Japan) Yui Narumiya	(North Korea) Ri Un-sim (9 goals)	Thailand

== Goalscorers ==
9 goals

- (North Korea) Ri Un-sim

3 goals

- (Japan) Mizuki Nakamura
- (Japan) Rika Masuya
- (North Korea) Ri Kyong-hyang

2 goals

- (Australia) Adriana Jones
- (China) Lei Jiahui
- (China) Song Duan
- (China) Wang Yaping
- (China) Zhang Chen
- (Japan) Akari Shiraki
- (Japan) Yui Narumiya
- (South Korea) Kim So-yi
- (South Korea) Namgung Ye-ji

1 goal

- (Australia) Lauren Ann Brown
- (Australia) Breanna Jane Sampson
- (China) Ji Xinyi
- (China) Lyu Yueyun
- (China) Song Yuqing
- (Japan) Arisa Matsubara
- (Japan) Ayaka Inoue
- (Japan) Ruka Norimatsu
- (Japan) Miki Hirata
- (Japan) Miki Itō
- (Japan) Yuka Momiki
- (Japan) Yuka Toriumi
- (South Korea) Lim Hee-eun
- (South Korea) Kim So-yi
- (South Korea) Yoon Ji-hyun
- (North Korea) Kim So-hyang
- (North Korea) Ri Kyong-hyang

Own goal

- (Thailand) Pannaray Suyao (playing against Japan)
