= 2013 AFC U-19 Women's Championship =

Tournament details
- Host country: China
- Dates: 11–20 October
- Teams: 6

Final positions
- Champions: South Korea (2nd title)
- Runners-up: North Korea
- Third place: China
- Fourth place: Japan

Tournament statistics
- Matches played: 15
- Goals scored: 56 (3.73 per match)
- Top scorer: (South Korea) Jang Sel-gi (8 goals)
- Best player: (South Korea) Jang Sel-gi
- Fair play award: China

The AFC U-19 Women's Championship 2013 is the seventh edition of the AFC U-19 Women's Championship. It was played from 11 to 20 October 2013. The top three teams (South Korea, North Korea, and China PR) qualified for the 2014 FIFA U-20 Women's World Cup.

== Venues ==
Nanjing
Jiangning Sports Center	Jiangsu Football Training Base Stadium
Capacity: 30,000	Capacity: 3,000
2013 AFC U-19 Women's Championship is located in China

== Seedings ==
	Teams entering in this round	Teams advancing from previous round	Competition format
First qualifying round (12 teams)	teams not in the top 8 of last tournament		3 groups of 4 teams, hosted by Malaysia, Jordan, and Philippines
Second qualifying round (8 teams)	teams placed 6 and 7 in last tournament: Thailand; Vietnam	3 group winners and 3 group runners-up from 1st qualifying round	2 groups of 4 teams, and a play-off between each group winner hosted by Vietnam
Final tournament (6 teams)	top 5 finishers from last tournament: Japan; North Korea; China; South Korea; Australia	1 play-off winner from 2nd qualifying round	round-robin tournament

== Qualification ==
First qualification round took place from 17 to 24 October 2012. The second round was played from 2 to 9 December 2012. Myanmar won the only qualification spot to the final tournament.

== Participating teams ==
The following teams qualified for the final tournament:

- Australia
- China
- Japan
- Myanmar (Note: Myanmar qualified to the final tournament by beating Thailand in the deciding play-off 1–0.)
- North Korea
- South Korea

== Format ==
The teams play each other once. There is no knock-out stage.

If two or more teams are equal on points on completion of the group matches, the following criteria were applied to determine the rankings.

1. Greater number of points obtained in the group matches between the teams concerned;
2. Goal difference resulting from the group matches between the teams concerned;
3. Greater number of goals scored in the group matches between the teams concerned;
4. Goal difference in all the group matches;
5. Greater number of goals scored in all the group matches;
6. Kicks from the penalty mark if only two teams are involved and they are both on the field of play;
7. Fewer score calculated according to the number of yellow and red cards received in the group matches;
8. Drawing of lots.

Results

Team	Pld	W	D	L	GF	GA	GD	Pts
South Korea	5	4	1	0	15	4	+11	13
North Korea	5	3	1	1	10	4	+6	10
China	5	2	2	1	14	6	+8	8
Japan	5	2	2	1	11	4	+7	8
Australia	5	1	0	4	6	12	−6	3
Myanmar	5	0	0	5	0	26	-26	0

11 October 2013
14:00

China	2–2	South Korea
Zhu Beiyan 29'; Song Duan 76'	Report	Jang Sel-gi 52'; Lee Geum-min 89'

Jiangning Sports Center, Nanjing
Attendance: 200
Referee: Sachiko Yamagishi (Japan)
11 October 2013
16:30

Japan	7–0	Myanmar
Shiraki 8'; Kurishima 10'; Tanaka 12', 16'; Michigami 26'; Hamamoto 66'; Inoue 90+2'	Report

Jiangning Sports Center, Nanjing
Attendance: 70
Referee: Pannipar Kamnueng (Thailand)
11 October 2013
16:30

North Korea	6–2	Australia
Kim Phyong-hwa 2'; Kim So-hyang 13', 52'; Ri Un-sim 67', 70', 84'	Report	Logarzo 39'; Raso 77'

Jiangsu Football Training Base Stadium, Nanjing
Attendance: 81
Referee: Qin Liang (China)

13 October 2013
14:00

South Korea	7–0	Myanmar
Jang Sel-gi 12', 17', 21', 53', 78'; Choe Yu-ri 33', 38'	Report

Jiangsu Football Training Base Stadium, Nanjing
Attendance: 30
Referee: Maria Rebello (India)
13 October 2013
14:00

Australia	0–2	Japan
	Report	Hasegawa 49'; Sumida 80'

Jiangning Sports Center, Nanjing
Attendance: 120
Referee: Ri Hyang-ok (North Korea)
13 October 2013
16:30

North Korea	1–0	China
Jon So-yon 5'	Report

Jiangning Sports Center, Nanjing
Attendance: 500
Referee: Abirami Apbai Naidu (Singapore)

15 October 2013
14:00

Japan	0–2	South Korea
	Report	Kim In-ji 74'; Choe Yu-ri 76'

Jiangning Sports Center, Nanjing
Attendance: 70
Referee: Abirami Apbai Naidu (Singapore)
15 October 2013
14:00

Myanmar	0–2	North Korea
	Report	Choe Chung-bok 26'; Kim Mi-gyong 88'

Jiangsu Football Training Base Stadium, Nanjing
Attendance: 40
Referee: Rita Gani (Malaysia)
15 October 2013
16:30

Australia	1–2	China
Raso 47'	Report	Wang Shuang 78', 79'

Jiangning Sports Center, Nanjing
Attendance: 130
Referee: Pannipar Kamnueng (Thailand)

18 October 2013
14:00

Myanmar	0–2	Australia
	Report	Harrison 50'; Whitfield 51'

Jiangsu Football Training Base Stadium, Nanjing
Attendance: 61
Referee: Maria Rebello (India)
18 October 2013
14:00

South Korea	2–1	North Korea
Lee Geum-min 30'; Jang Sel-gi 36'	Report	Ri Un-sim 49'

Jiangning Sports Center, Nanjing
Attendance: 130
Referee: Sachiko Yamagishi (Japan)
18 October 2013
16:33

China	2–2	Japan
Song Duan 45'; Li Mengwen 54'	Report	Michigami 27'; Naomoto 58'

Jiangning Sports Center, Nanjing
Attendance: 320
Referee: Rita Gani (Malaysia)

20 October 2013
14:00

Japan	0–0	North Korea
	Report

Jiangning Sports Center, Nanjing
Attendance: 120
Referee: Pannipar Kamnueng (Thailand)
20 October 2013
14:00

Australia	1–2	South Korea
Yeoman-Dale 33'	Report	Jang Sel-gi 20'; Lee So-dam 41' (pen.)

Jiangsu Football Training Base Stadium, Nanjing
Attendance: 60
Referee: Qin Liang (China)
20 October 2013
16:30

Myanmar	0–8	China
	Report	Li Mengwen 11'; Lyu Yueyun 16'; Wang Shuang 32', 45', 89'; Song Duan 34'; Zhao Xinzhai 39'; Li Xiang 57'

Jiangning Sports Center, Nanjing
Attendance: 585
Referee: Ri Hyang-ok (North Korea)

== Winners ==
AFC U-19 Women's Championship 2013

South Korea
Second title

== Awards ==
The following awards were given.

Most Valuable Player	Top Scorer	Fair Play Award
(South Korea) Jang Sel-gi	(South Korea) Jang Sel-gi (8 goals)	China

== Goalscorers ==
8 goals

- (South Korea) Jang Sel-gi

5 goals

- (China) Wang Shuang

4 goals

- (North Korea) Ri Un-sim

3 goals

- (South Korea) Choi Yu-ri
- (China) Song Duan

2 goals

- (Australia) Hayley Raso
- (China) Li Mengwen
- (Japan) Ayaka Michigami
- (Japan) Mina Tanaka
- (South Korea) Lee Geum-min
- (North Korea) Kim So-hyang

1 goals

- (Australia) Amy Harrison
- (Australia) Chloe Logarzo
- (Australia) Brittany Whitfield
- (Australia) Georgia Yeoman-Dale
- (China) Zhu Beiyan
- (China) Lyu Yueyun
- (China) Zhao Xinzhai
- (China) Li Xiang
- (Japan) Akari Kurishima
- (Japan) Akari Shiraki
- (Japan) Ayaka Inoue
- (Japan) Marin Hamamoto
- (Japan) Rin Sumida
- (Japan) Hikaru Naomoto
- (Japan) Yui Hasegawa
- (South Korea) Kim In-ji
- (South Korea) Lee So-dam
- (North Korea) Jon So-yon
- (North Korea) Kim Phyong-hwa
- (North Korea) Choe Chung-bok
- (North Korea) Kim Mi-gyong
