= Claire Jacob =

French footballer (born 1996)

Personal information
- Date of birth: 3 May 1996 (age 30)
- Place of birth: Sedan, France
- Height: 1.73 m (5 ft 8 in)
- Position: Goalkeeper

Youth career
- 2002–2006: AS de Glaire
- 2006–2008: CS Sedan Ardennes
- 2008–2011: OFC Charleville
- 2011–2012: Hénin-Beaumont

Senior career*
Years	Team	Apps	(Gls)
2011–2012	Hénin-Beaumont	5	(0)
2012–2014	Arras	30	(0)
2014–2015	Lillers	15	(0)
2015–2018	Reims	36	(0)
Total		86	(0)

International career
2012	France U17	3	(0)
2013–2014	France U19	4	(0)
2016	France U23	1	(0)
Medal record
Women's football
Representing France
FIFA U-17 Women's World Cup
Winner	2012 Azerbaijan
UEFA Women's Under-17 Championship
Runner-up	2012 Switzerland
- * Club domestic league appearances and goals

Claire Jacob (born 3 May 1996) is a French former footballer who played as a goalkeeper.

== Honours ==
France U17

- FIFA U-17 Women's World Cup: 2012
- UEFA Women's Under-17 Championship runners-up: 2012
