= Gabriela Álvarez (footballer) =

Mexican footballer (born 1996)

Personal information
- Full name: Gabriela Rocío Álvarez Huerta
- Date of birth: 21 February 1996 (age 30)
- Place of birth: Tepic, Nayarit, Mexico
- Height: 1.64 m (5 ft 5 in)
- Position: Centre-back

Senior career*
Years	Team	Apps	(Gls)
2018–2019	Monterrey	18	(1)
2019–2020	UNAM	34	(1)
2021	Juárez	30	(2)
2022–2023	Cruz Azul	12	(1)
2023–2024	Mazatlán	32	(1)
2025–2026	Querétaro	25	(1)
2026-	Granada CF (women)		

International career^{‡}
2011–2012	Mexico U17		
- * Club domestic league appearances and goals as of 5 February 2026 ‡ National team caps and goals as of 12 March 2022

Gabriela Rocío Álvarez Huerta (born 21 February 1996) is a Mexican professional footballer who plays as a centre-back.

== Career ==
In 2018, she started her career in Monterrey. In 2019, she was transferred to UNAM. In 2021, she joined Juárez. In 2022, she was transferred to Cruz Azul. Since 2024, she is part of Mazatlán.

== International career ==
Álvarez represented Mexico at the 2012 FIFA U-17 Women's World Cup.
