= Sana Daoudi =

Moroccan footballer (born 1998)

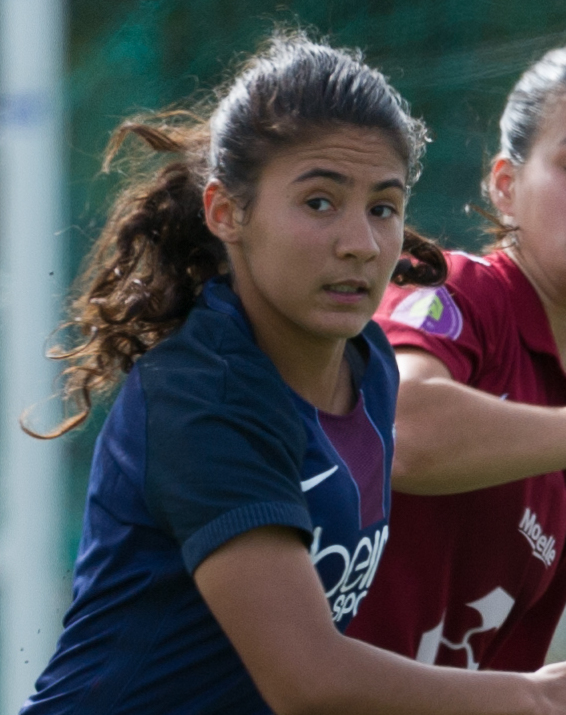

Personal information
- Date of birth: 12 March 1998 (age 28)
- Place of birth: Saint-Denis, France
- Height: 1.62 m (5 ft 4 in)
- Position: Midfielder

Team information
- Current team: Guingamp
- Number: 8

Senior career*
Years	Team	Apps	(Gls)
2016–2018	Paris Saint-Germain	1	(0)
2017–2018	→ Atlético Madrid (loan)	8	(0)
2018–	Guingamp	95	(3)

International career^{‡}
2017	France U19	7	(0)
2018	France U20	5	(0)
2022–	Morocco	1	(0)
- * Club domestic league appearances and goals as of 22 September 2024 ‡ National team caps and goals as of 14 November 2022

Sana Daoudi (Arabic: سناء الداودي; born 12 March 1998) is a professional footballer who plays as a midfielder for Première Ligue club Guingamp. Born in France, she has represented her country of birth and Morocco at youth and senior levels, respectively.

== Early life ==
Daoudi is a native of Paris, France, and started playing football at French side Aulnay FC. She was regarded as a French international football prospect.

== Club career ==
Daoudi started her career with French side PSG. While playing for the club, she suffered injuries and received interest and offers from English sides. In 2017, she signed for Spanish side Atlético Madrid, helping the club win the league. After that, she signed for French side Guingamp.

== International career ==
Daoudi represented France internationally at youth level. She helped the youth national team reach the semi-finals of the 2018 FIFA U-20 Women's World Cup. In 2022, Daoudi received her first call-up to represent the Morocco women's national football team internationally.

== Style of play ==
Daoudi mainly operates as a midfielder and is known for her tenaciousness. She is also known for her ability to mark opposing players.
