= Sabrina Soravilla =

Uruguayan footballer (born 1996)

Personal information
- Full name: Sabrina Soravilla Calvano
- Date of birth: 25 August 1996 (age 30)
- Place of birth: Canelones, Uruguay
- Height: 1.70 m (5 ft 7 in)
- Position: Midfielder

Team information
- Current team: Nacional

Youth career
- 2014–2015: Nacional

Senior career*
Years	Team	Apps	(Gls)
2014–2018	Nacional	68	(16)
2019–	Liverpool Montevideo	5	(0)

International career^{‡}
2012	Uruguay U17	2	(0)
2014–	Uruguay	4	(0)
- * Club domestic league appearances and goals ‡ National team caps and goals as of 3 March 2019

Sabrina Soravilla Calvano (born 25 August 1996) is a Uruguayan footballer who plays as a midfielder for Liverpool FC (Montevideo) and the Uruguay women's national team.

== International career ==
Soravilla represented Uruguay at the 2012 FIFA U-17 Women's World Cup along with her twin Romina. At senior level, she played in two Copa América Femenina editions (2014 and 2018).
