= Keisy Silveira =

Uruguayan footballer (born 1995)

Personal information
- Full name: Keisy Nicol Silveira Davitte
- Date of birth: 12 November 1995 (age 30)
- Place of birth: Montevideo, Uruguay
- Position: Forward

Team information
- Current team: Racing Power FC
- Number: 23

Senior career*
Years	Team	Apps	(Gls)
2009	Colón		
2009–2017	Nacional	55+	(117)
2018–2019	Colón	28	(17)
2019	Tolima	3	
2019–2020	Paio Pires	14	(44)
2020–2021	Valadares Gaia	16	(4)
2021	Valadares Gaia B	2	(0)
2021–	Racing Power FC	28	(16)

International career^{‡}
2012	Uruguay U17	2	(0)
2019–	Uruguay	3+	(1+)
- * Club domestic league appearances and goals as of 17 Feb 2023 ‡ National team caps and goals as of 17 Feb 2023

Keisy Nicol Silveira Davitte (born 28 July 1995) is a Uruguayan footballer who plays as a forward for Portuguese Campeonato Nacional Feminino club Valadares Gaia FC and the Uruguay women's national team.

== Club career ==
Silveira has played for Colón and Nacional in Uruguay, for Tolima in Colombia and for Paio Pires and Valadares Gaia in Portugal.

== International career ==
Silveira represented Uruguay at the 2012 FIFA U-17 Women's World Cup. She made her senior debut on 23 May 2019 in a 1–3 friendly away loss to Argentina.
