= Samantha Arellano =

Mexican footballer (born 1995)

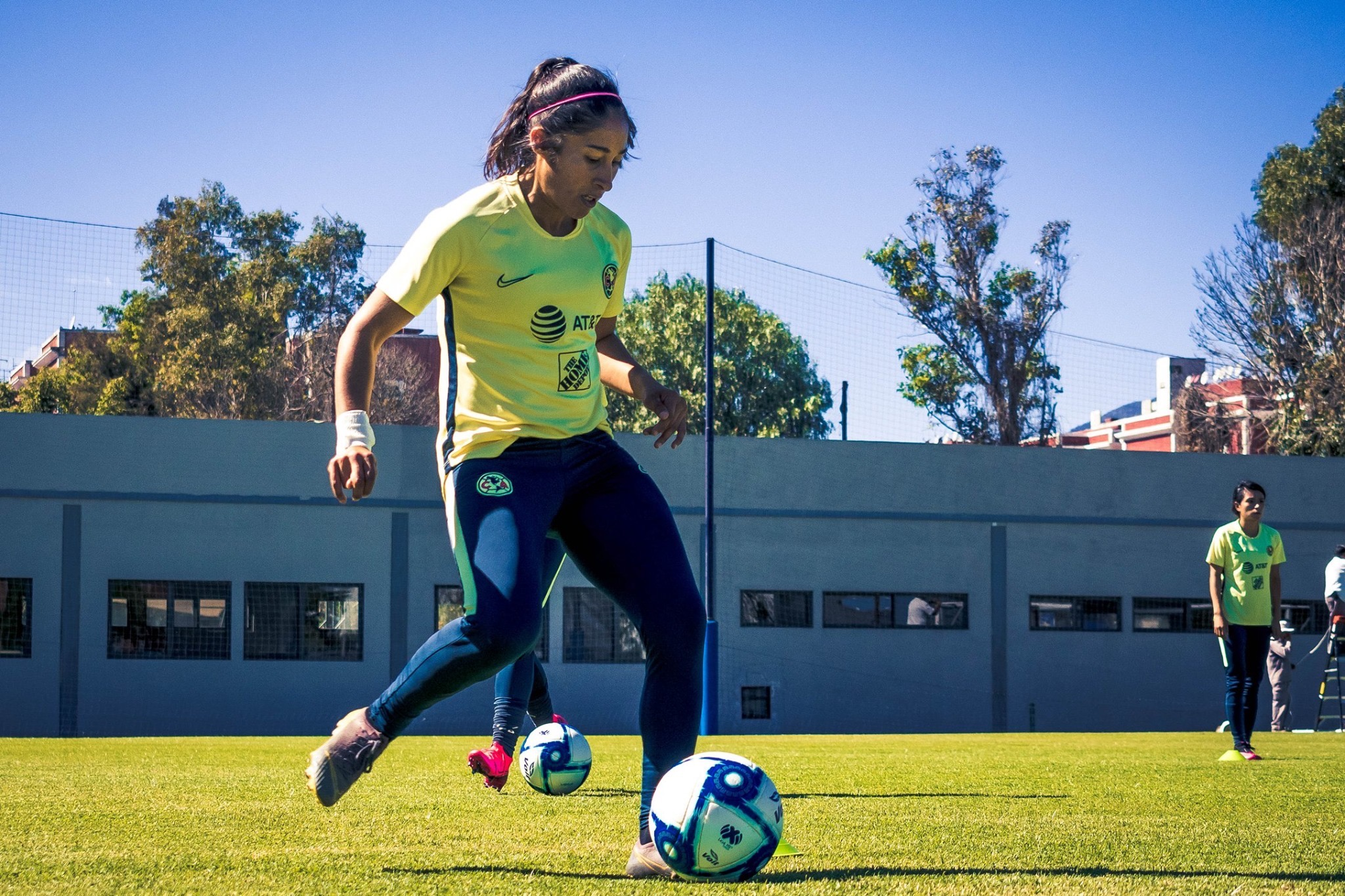

Personal information
- Full name: Samantha Arellano Duron
- Date of birth: 21 August 1995 (age 31)
- Place of birth: Tijuana, Baja California, Mexico
- Height: 1.67 m (5 ft 6 in)
- Position: Midfielder

Youth career
- 2009–2013: San Ysidro High School

College career
Years	Team	Apps	(Gls)
2013–2016	UC Riverside Highlanders		

Senior career*
Years	Team	Apps	(Gls)
2017–2018	Tijuana	40	(4)
2019–2020	América	16	(0)
2020–2022	Tijuana	45	(1)

International career
2012	Mexico U17		
- * Club domestic league appearances and goals as of 2 March 2020

Samantha Arellano Duron (born 21 August 1995) is a Mexican professional footballer who plays as a midfielder.

== Early life ==
Born in Tijuana, Mexico, Arellano attended San Ysidro High School in San Diego, California where she became two-time South Bay League champion from 2009 to 2013. During her time with the Cougars, she became the top scoring soccer player for the women's soccer team, registering 96 goals during her four years of varsity soccer. Arellano was recognized as MVP her sophomore, junior, and senior year by her team and the South Bay League Conference and won All-Conference Academic honors.

Arellano also played for the San Diego United club from 2011 to 2013. During this time, she participated in the 2012 FIFA U-17 Women's World Cup representing Mexico. After her participation, Arellano was offered to be part of the UC Riverside Highlanders women's Soccer team to compete in the NCAA Division I Big West Conference intercollegiate competition.

== College career ==
Arellano began her participation with the UC Riverside Highlanders Women's Soccer team in 2013 where she saw her first action and first start in the team's season-opening 3–2 loss to UNLV. She picked up her first assist against San Jose State University on August 25, 2013. During the Big West Conference, Arellano recorded a goal and an assist in the 3–1 victory over California State University, Northridge, scored the only goal in the 3–1 loss to California Polytechnic State University, and finished second on the team in points, goals and assists. The Big West named her to the All-Conference Honorable Mention Team, while College Sports Madness named her to the All-Conference, Second Team. During her sophomore year, College Sports Madness named her to the Big West Preseason All-Conference First Team, scored in the Highlanders' first two matches of the season—a 3–0 victory over Grand Canyon University and a 4–2 win over Northern Arizona University—and was named to the Big West All-Academic Team. In Arellano's third season, she recorded the first multi-goal match of her collegiate career in a 2–0 victory at the University of South Dakota and was named to the Big West All-Academic Team. Arellano finished her college career in 2016 with two assists in the 3–0 victory against the University of Houston. By June 2017, she completed a Bachelor of Arts (B.A.) in psychology, from the University of California, Riverside.

== Club career ==
The Liga MX Femenil began its foundation in 2017 and Arellano was one of the many players who pioneered in the league. She debuted with Club Tijuana in July 2017 against Club America in Mexico City, playing the full 90 minutes.

Arellano participated in three tournaments with the team from 2017 to 2018 registering four goals after her third season. She scored her first professional career goal against C.F Pachuca September 30, 2017 at Estadio Caliente.

After her third tournament with Tijuana, Arellano signed with América for the 2019 season and was part of the team from January 2019 to June 2020. Arellano came back to Tijuana in 2020.
