= Léa Declercq =

French footballer (born 1995)

Lea Declercq
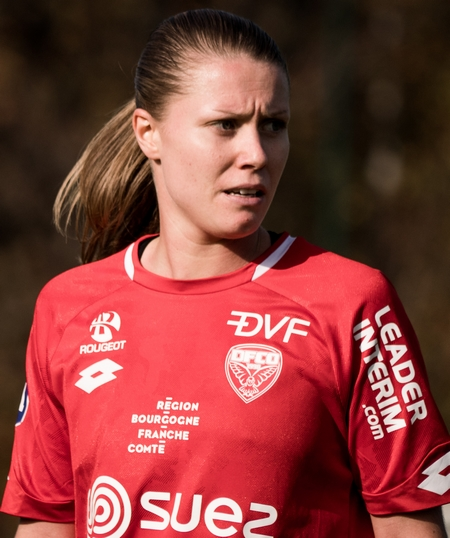

Personal information
- Date of birth: 12 May 1995 (age 31)
- Place of birth: Croix, France
- Height: 1.68 m (5 ft 6 in)
- Position: Forward

Team information
- Current team: RC Strasbourg

Senior career*
Years	Team	Apps	(Gls)
2010–2013	FCF Hénin-Beaumont	28	(9)
2013–2016	Paris Saint-Germain	12	(0)
2016–2017	FCF Juvisy	15	(2)
2017–2018	Paris FC	21	(2)
2018–2026	Dijon	121	(18)

International career
2010–2012	France U17	28	(17)
2013–2014	France U19	19	(8)
2018	France B	2	(0)
- * Club domestic league appearances and goals as of 3 October 2025

Léa Declercq (born 12 May 1995) is a French footballer who plays as a striker for RC Strasbourg.

== International career ==
Declercq represented France at youth level.

== Honours ==
France U17

- FIFA U-17 Women's World Cup: 2012
