= Romane Bruneau =

French association football player (born 1996)

Personal information
- Full name: Romane Bruneau
- Date of birth: 27 August 1996 (age 30)
- Place of birth: Angers, Maine-et-Loire, France
- Height: 1.67 m (5 ft 6 in)
- Position: Goalkeeper

Senior career*
Years	Team	Apps	(Gls)
2011–2014	La Roche-sur-Yon	15	(0)
2014	FCF Juvisy	0	(0)
2015–2016	La Roche-sur-Yon	22	(0)
2016–2017	Dijon	12	(0)
2017–2018	Lyon	0	(0)
2018–2022	Bordeaux	16	(0)
2022	Toulouse	5	(0)
2023	Bordeaux	0	(0)

International career
2011–2013	France U17	18	(0)
2013–2015	France U19	6	(0)
2014–2016	France U20	4	(0)
- * Club domestic league appearances and goals

Romane Bruneau (born 27 August 1996) is a French goalkeeper.

== Honours ==
France U17

- 2012 FIFA U-17 Women's World Cup winner in Azerbaijan, 2012
