= Candice Gherbi =

French footballer (born 1995)

Personal information
- Date of birth: 5 September 1995 (age 31)
- Place of birth: Die, Drôme, France
- Height: 1.65 m (5 ft 5 in)
- Position: Midfielder

Team information
- Current team: FC Metz

International career
Years	Team	Apps	(Gls)
- France (women U-19)

Candice Gherbi (born 5 September 1995) is a French footballer who plays as a midfielder for FC Metz.

== Honours ==
=== International ===
- France U17
  - 2012 FIFA U-17 Women's World Cup winner in Azerbaijan, 2012
