= Cindy Perrault =

French footballer (born 1996)

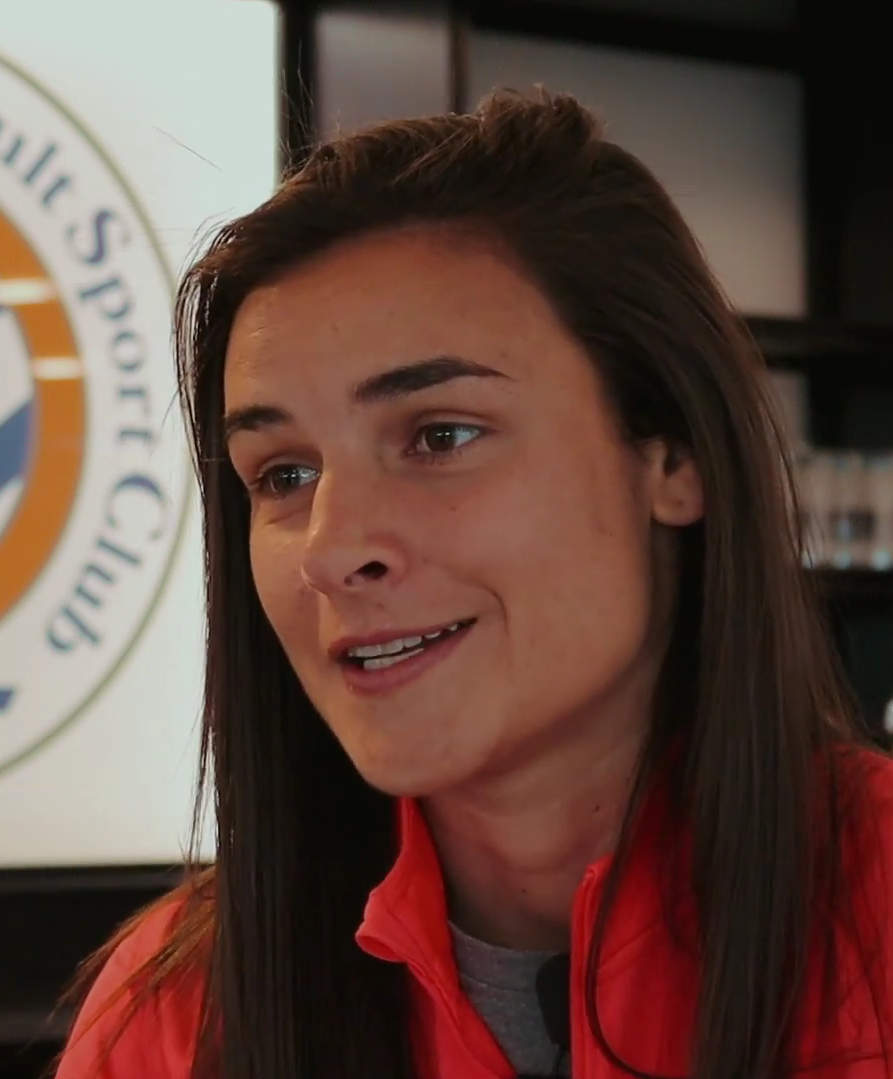
- Perrault in 2020

Personal information
- Date of birth: 5 September 1996 (age 30)
- Place of birth: Angers, France
- Height: 1.72 m (5 ft 8 in)
- Position: Goalkeeper

Youth career
- 2011–2013: Lyon

Senior career*
Years	Team	Apps	(Gls)
2013–2016	Lyon	0	(0)
2016–2017	Albi	11	(0)
2017–2019	Grenoble	37	(0)
2019–2021	Montpellier	15	(0)
2021–2025	Guingamp	32	(0)

International career
2011–2012	France U16	6	(0)
2012	France U17	2	(0)
2014–2015	France U19	12	(0)
2016	France U20	2	(0)
- * Club domestic league appearances and goals

Cindy Perrault (born 26 January 1996) is a French professional footballer who plays as a goalkeeper.
