= Arisa Matsubara =

Japanese footballer (born 1995)

Arisa Matsubara 松原 有沙
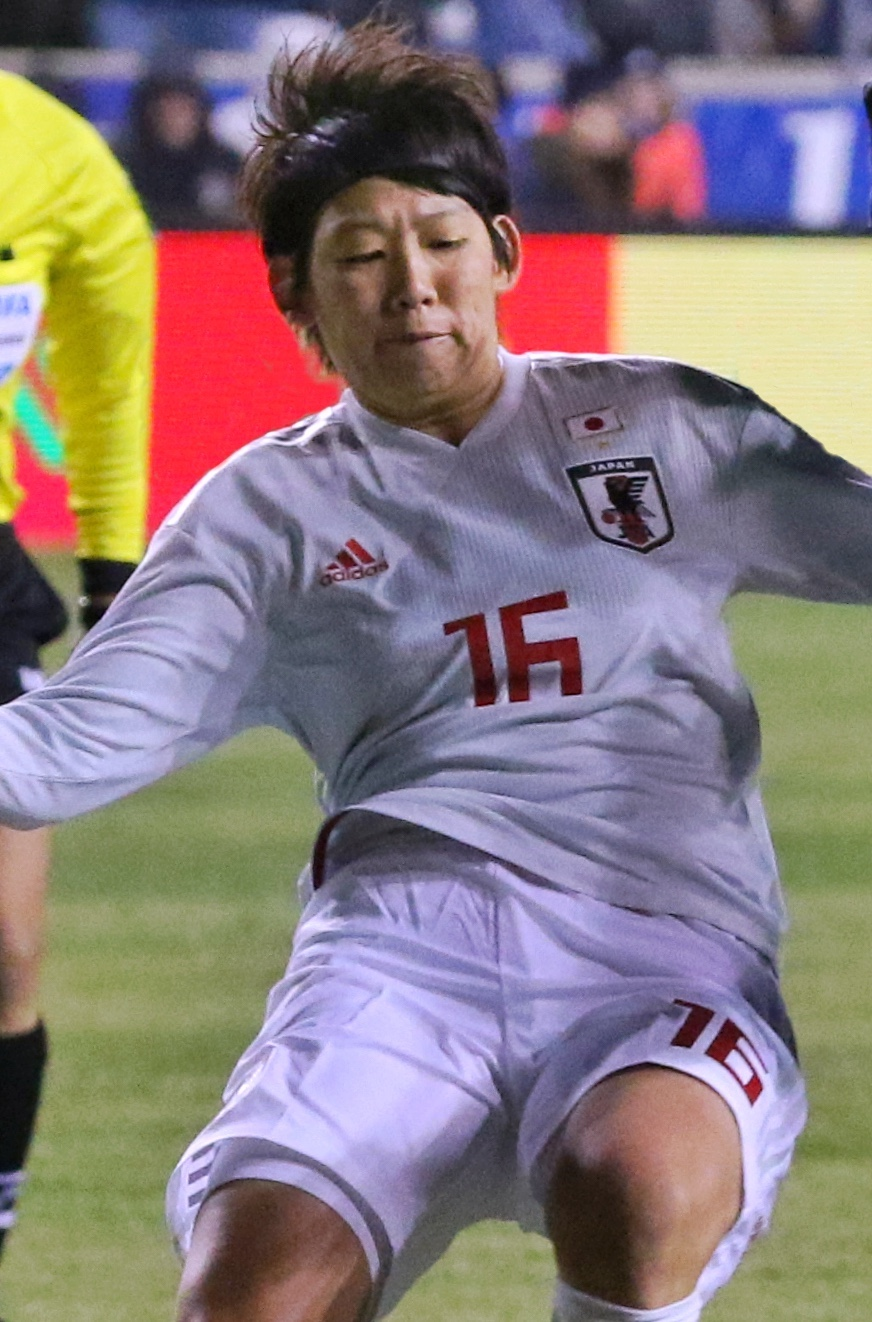
- Matsubara in 2019

Personal information
- Full name: Arisa Matsubara
- Date of birth: May 1, 1995 (age 31)
- Place of birth: Otaru, Hokkaido, Japan
- Height: 1.68 m (5 ft 6 in)
- Position: Midfielder

Team information
- Current team: Nojima Stella
- Number: 6

Youth career
- 2011–2013: Daisho Gakuen High School
- 2014–2017: Waseda University

Senior career*
Years	Team	Apps	(Gls)
2018–	Nojima Stella	0	(0)

International career^{‡}
2012	Japan U-17	2	(0)
2019	Japan	4	(1)
Medal record
Representing Japan
AFC U-16 Women's Championship
Gold medal – first place	2011 China
- * Club domestic league appearances and goals ‡ National team caps and goals as of December 17, 2019

Arisa Matsubara (松原 有沙, Matsubara Arisa; born May 1, 1995) is a Japanese footballer who plays as a midfielder. She plays for Nojima Stella Kanagawa Sagamihara and the Japan national team.

== Club career ==
Matsubara was born in Hokkaido on May 1, 1995. After graduating from Waseda University, she joined L.League club Nojima Stella Kanagawa Sagamihara in 2018.

== National team career ==
In September 2012, Matsubara was selected for the Japan U-17 national team for the 2012 U-17 World Cup. She played two matches in the tournament.

In February 2019, Matsubara was selected Japan national team for SheBelieves Cup. At this tournament, on February 27, she debuted as defensive midfielder against United States.

== National team statistics ==
Japan national team
Year	Apps	Goals
2019	4	1
Total	4	1

== International goals ==
.Scores and results list Japan's goal tally first.

No.	Date	Venue	Opponent	Score	Result	Competition
1.	11 December 2019	Busan Asiad Main Stadium, Busan, South Korea	Chinese Taipei	5–0	9–0	2019 EAFF E-1 Football Championship
