= Gambia women's national under-17 football team =

Gambia
- Nickname: The Scorpions
- Association: Gambia Football Federation
- Confederation: CAF (Africa)
- Sub-confederation: WAFU (West Africa)
- FIFA code: GAM
First colours	Second colours

African Cup of Nations
- Appearances: 2 (first in 2012)
- Best result: Winners (2012)

FIFA U-17 Women's World Cup
- Appearances: 1 (first in 2012)
- Best result: Group stage (2012)

Gambia women's national under-17 football team represents Gambia in international youth football competitions.

== FIFA U-17 Women's World Cup ==
Year	Round	Pld	W	D	L	GF	GA
(New Zealand) 2008	Did not qualify						
(Trinidad and Tobago) 2010	Did not qualify						
(Azerbaijan) 2012	Group stage	3	0	0	3	2	27
(Costa Rica) 2014	Did not qualify						
(Jordan) 2016	Did not qualify						
(Uruguay) 2018	Did not qualify						
(India) 2022	Did not qualify						
(Dominican Republic) 2024	Did not qualify						
(Morocco) 2025	Did not qualify						
(Morocco) 2026	To be determined						
(Morocco) 2027	To be determined						
(Morocco) 2028	To be determined						
(Morocco) 2029	To be determined						
Total	1/13	3	0	0	3	2	27

== African U-17 Cup of Nations for Women ==
Year	Result	Matches	Wins	Draws*	Losses	GF	GA
Home / away 2008	Did not enter						
Home / away 2010	Did not enter						
Home / away 2012	Winners	4	3	0	1	7	4
Home / away 2013	Did not enter						
Home / away 2016	Did not enter						
Home / away 2018	First round	3	1	0	2	4	7
Home / away 2022	Did not enter						
Total	2/7	7	4	0	3	11	11

== Head-to-head record ==
The following table shows Gambia's head-to-head record in the FIFA U-17 Women's World Cup.

Opponent	Pld	W	D	L	GF	GA	GD	Win %
France	1	0	0	1	2	10	−8	0.00
North Korea	1	0	0	1	0	11	−11	0.00
United States	1	0	0	1	0	6	−6	0.00
Total	3	0	0	3	2	27	−25	0.00

=== Previous squads ===
2012 FIFA U-17 Women's World Cup

== See also ==
- Gambia women's national football team
- Gambia women's national under-20 football team
