= Abuko =

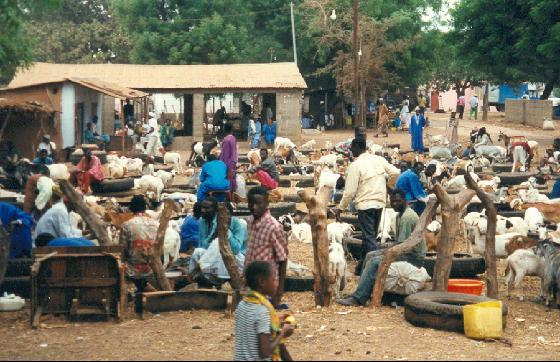
- Livestock market in Abuko

- Location in the Gambia
- Coordinates: 13°24′15″N 16°39′21″W
- Country: The Gambia
- Division: Western Division
- District: Kombo North/Saint Mary
- Elevation: 49 ft (15 m)

Population (2012)
  - Total: 6,572
- Time zone: UTC+0 (UTC)

Abuko is a town in the West Coast Division of the Gambia, five miles southwest of the capital Banjul. It is located in the district of Kombo North/Saint Mary to the north of Banjul International Airport and Abuko Nature Reserve.

== Location ==
Abuko is in the West Coast Division, in the western part of the country, 10 kilometres (6.2 mi) south-west of the capital city Banjul. It had 6,572 inhabitants as of 2012. The area around Abuko is well-populated, with 1,056 people per square kilometer. The nearest larger city is Serekunda, 4.5 kilometres (2.8 mi) north-west of Abuko. The town is home to the Abuko United FC.

The 259 acres (105 ha) Abuko Nature Reserve, created in 1968, lies to the south of the town. It is the most visited tourist attraction in Gambia, with over 30,000 visitors annually. It contains tropical canopy forest near the Lamin Stream, giving way to Guinean savanna further from the water. The reserve is home to many species of bird, four primates and a variety of reptiles.

== Terrain ==
Abuko is 15 metres (49 ft) above sea level. (Note: Elevation is calculated from elevation data from the Viewfinder Panoramas.) The surrounding land is mainly flat. (Note: Terrain characteristics are calculated from the variance of all elevation data from the Viewfinder Panoramas within a 10 kilometres (6.2 mi) radius.) The highest point nearby has an elevation of 26 metres (85 ft), 1 kilometre (0.62 mi) south of Abuko. (Note: Calculated from elevation data from the Viewfinder Panoramas.) The vegetation around Abuko is almost all fields. Peninsulas and islands are common in the region. (Note: Peninsulas, and islands are more common in a 10 kilometres (6.2 mi) radius than for the average point on the earth, according to the GeoNames.)

== Climate ==
Abuko has a savanna climate. The average temperature is 24 °C (75 °F). The hottest month is April, with 27 °C (81 °F) and the coldest month is July, with 22 °C (72 °F). Average annual rainfall is 1,148 millimetres (45.2 in). The wettest month is August, with 449 millimetres (17.7 in) of rain, and the driest month is February, with 1 millimetre (0.039 in) of rain.

Abuko

Climate chart (precipitation, max. and min. temperature)
J	F	M	A	M	J	J	A	S	O	N	D
2 32 15	1 33 17	1 36 17	1 36 18	18 36 18	63 27 19	269 25 19	449 22 22	254 24 21	86 27 22	3 29 20	1 31 17
- █ Average max. and min. temperatures in °C
- █ Precipitation totals in mm
Imperial conversion
J	F	M	A	M	J	J	A	S	O	N	D
0.1 90 59	0 91 63	0 97 63	0 97 64	0.7 97 64	2.5 81 66	11 77 66	18 72 72	10 75 70	3.4 81 72	0.1 84 68	0 88 63
- █ Average max. and min. temperatures in °F
- █ Precipitation totals in inches
