= Penda Bah =

Gambian footballer

Personal information
- Date of birth: 17 August 1998 (age 28)
- Place of birth: Gambia
- Height: 1.79 m (5 ft 10 in)
- Position: Midfielder

Team information
- Current team: VIIMSI JK (ESTONIA)

Senior career*
Years	Team	Apps	(Gls)
2019	Dream Stars		
- Police Ladies

International career
2012	Gambia U17	2+	(1+)
- Gambia
- * Club domestic league appearances and goals

Penda Bah (born 17 August 1998) is a Gambian footballer who plays as a midfielder and captains the Gambia women's national team.

== Club career ==
Ahead of the 2019 NWPL season, Bah signed for newly promoted Nigeria Women Premier League side, Dream Stars F.C.
