= Vivien Beil =

German footballer (born 1995)

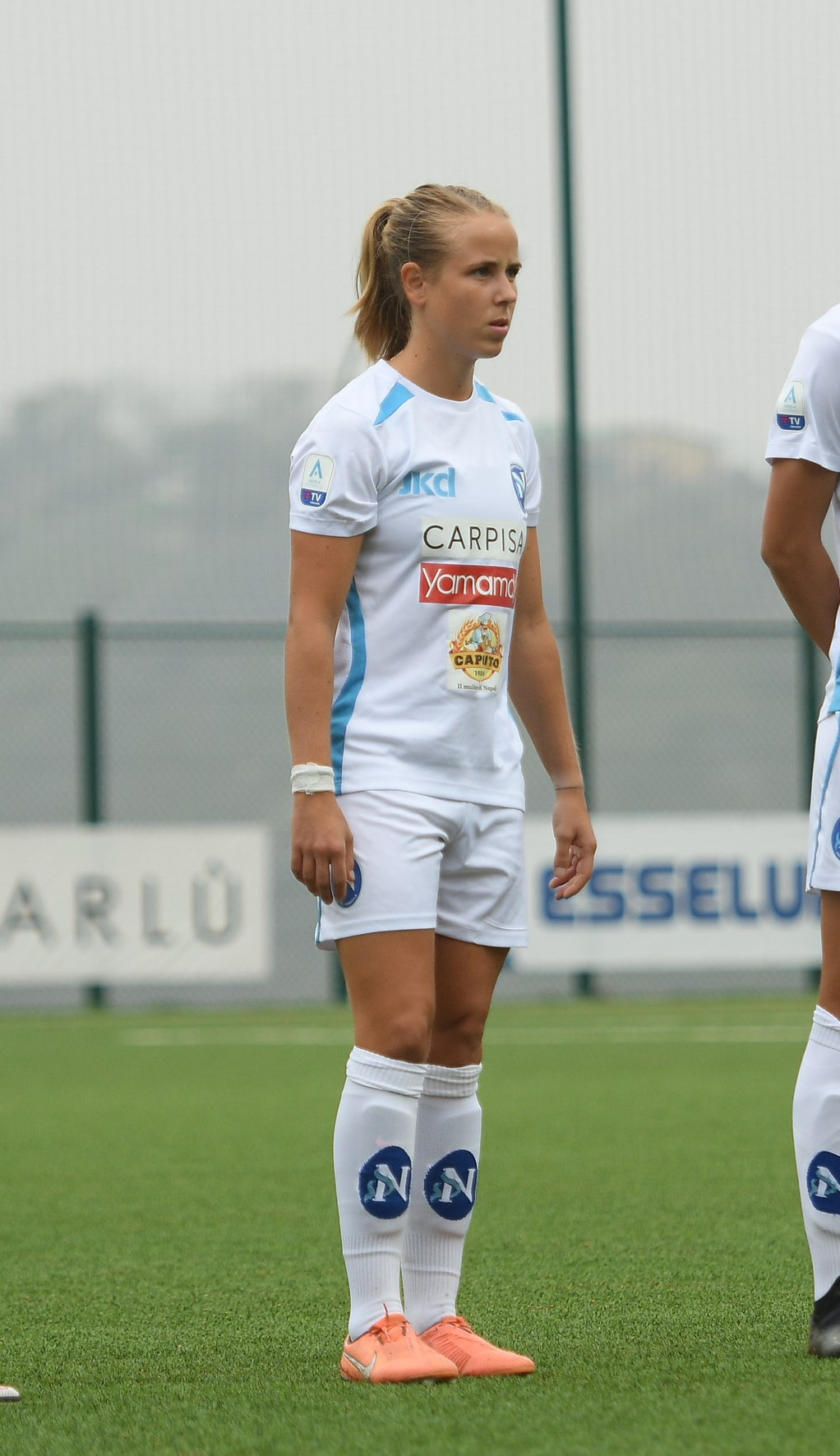

Personal information
- Date of birth: 12 December 1995 (age 30)
- Place of birth: Jena, Germany
- Height: 1.64 m (5 ft 5 in)
- Position: Midfielder

Youth career
- USV Jena

College career
Years	Team	Apps	(Gls)
2015–2017	Maine Black Bears	33	(6)
2017–2020	UConn Huskies	33	(7)

Senior career*
Years	Team	Apps	(Gls)
2011–2015	USV Jena	56	(3)
2020	Napoli	0	(0)
2020	San Marino	0	(0)
2020–2021	Napoli	14	(0)
2021–2023	Como	24	(3)
2023–2024	Parma	22	(3)
2024–2025	Napoli	2	(0)
Total		118	(9)

International career
2011	Germany U16	5	(1)
2011–2012	Germany U17	14	(5)
2013	Germany U19	4	(1)
- * Club domestic league appearances and goals as of 16:38, 21 December 2025 (UTC)

Vivien Beil (born 12 December 1995) is a German former professional footballer who played as a midfielder.
