= Abuko United FC =

Association football club in the Gambia

Abuko United
- Full name: Abuko United Football Club
- Ground: Serrekunda East Mini-Stadium
- Capacity: 10,000
- League: Gambian Championnat National D1 Woman

Abuko United Football Club is a Gambian sports club based in Abuko near Kombo North/Saint Mary. The Men's team play in the Serrekunda East Sports Development Organisation.

The Women's team play in Gambian Championnat National D1 Woman.

== Stadium ==
Currently the team plays at the 10000 capacity Serrekunda East Mini-Stadium.
