= Lü Yueyun =

Chinese footballer

Personal information
- Full name: Lü Yueyun
- Date of birth: 13 November 1995 (age 30)
- Place of birth: China
- Position: Midfielder

International career^{‡}
Years	Team	Apps	(Gls)
2011	China U16	?	(3)
2012	China U17	3	(1)
2013	China U19	?	(1)
2017–	China	4	(0)
- ‡ National team caps and goals as of 10 November 2019

Lü Yueyun (born 13 November 1995) is a Chinese footballer who plays as a midfielder. She has been a member of the China women's national team. She plays for WFC Lokomotiv Moscow in the Russian Women's Football Championship since 2023.
