= France women's national under-17 football team =

Selected team of French football players under 17 years

France Women's U-17
- Association: France Football Federation
- Confederation: UEFA (Europe)
- Head coach: Cécile Locatelli
- FIFA code: FRA
First colours	Second colours

UEFA Women's Under-17 Championship
- Appearances: 12 (first in 2008)
- Best result: Winners (2023)

FIFA U-17 Women's World Cup
- Appearances: 5 (first in 2008)
- Best result: Winners (2012)

The France women's national under-17 football team is a youth football team that represents France at UEFA Women's Under-17 Championship and U-17 Women's World Cup tournaments. They were the first non-Asian country to win a U-17 Women's World Cup in 2012.

== Fixtures and results ==
Legend

Win Draw Lose Fixture

== Players ==
=== Previous squads ===
- 2008 FIFA U-17 Women's World Cup
- 2012 FIFA U-17 Women's World Cup

== Competitive record ==
=== FIFA U-17 Women's World Cup ===
Year	Result	Pld	W	D*	L	GF	GA
(New Zealand) 2008	Group stage	3	1	1	1	8	10
(Trinidad and Tobago) 2010	Did not qualify						
(Azerbaijan) 2012	Champions	6	2	4	0	14	4
(Costa Rica) 2014	Did not qualify						
(Jordan) 2016	Did not qualify						
(Uruguay) 2018	Did not qualify						
(India) 2022	Group stage	3	0	1	2	2	5
(Dominican Republic) 2024	Did not qualify						
(Morocco) 2025	Quarter-finals	5	2	2	1	8	6
(Morocco) 2026	Round of 16	4	2	1	1	3	2
(Morocco) 2027	To be determined						
(Morocco) 2028	To be determined						
(Morocco) 2029	To be determined						
Total	5/13	21	7	9	5	35	27

* Draws include knockout matches decided by penalty shoot-out.

FIFA U-17 Women's World Cup History
Year	Round	Opponent	Scores	Result	Venue
2008	Group stage	Paraguay	6–2	Win	Hamilton, New Zealand
2008	Group stage	Japan	1–7	Loss	Hamilton, New Zealand
2008	Group stage	United States	1–1	Draw	Auckland, New Zealand
2012	Group stage	United States	0–0	Draw	Baku, Azerbaijan
2012	Group stage	North Korea	1–1	Draw	Baku, Azerbaijan
2012	Group stage	Gambia	10–2	Win	Baku, Azerbaijan
2012	Quarter-finals	Nigeria	0–0 (a.e.t.) (5–3 p)	Draw	Baku, Azerbaijan
2012	Semi-finals	Ghana	2–0	Win	Baku, Azerbaijan
2012	Final	North Korea	1–1 (7–6 p)	Draw	Baku, Azerbaijan
2022	Group D	Canada	1–1	Draw	Margao, India
2022	Group D	Tanzania	1–2	Loss	Margao, India
2022	Group D	Japan	0–2	Loss	Margao, India

=== UEFA Women's Under-17 Championship ===
Year	Result	Pld	W	D	L	GF	GA
(Switzerland) 2008	Runners-up	2	1	0	1	3	4
(Switzerland) 2009	Third place	2	1	0	1	4	5
(Switzerland) 2010	Did not qualify						
(Switzerland) 2011	Runners-up	2	0	1	1	2	3
(Switzerland) 2012	Runners-up	2	1	1	0	6	2
(Switzerland) 2013	Did not qualify						
(England) 2014	Group stage	3	1	0	2	1	6
(Iceland) 2015	Semi-finals	4	2	1	1	5	3
(Belarus) 2016	Did not qualify						
(Czech Republic) 2017	Group stage	3	1	1	1	4	4
(Lithuania) 2018	Did not qualify						
(Bulgaria) 2019	Did not qualify						
(Sweden) ~~2020~~	Cancelled						
(Faroe Islands) ~~2021~~	Cancelled						
(Bosnia and Herzegovina) 2022	Third place	5	3	0	2	5	4
(Estonia) 2023	Champions	5	4	1	0	20	5
(Sweden) 2024	Fourth place	5	2	1	2	14	11
(Faroe Islands) 2025	Semi-finals	4	1	3	0	6	4
(Northern Ireland) 2026	Runners-up	5	3	1	1	11	3
(Finland) 2027	To be determined						
(Belgium) 2028	To be determined						
(Turkey) 2029	To be determined						
Total:12/16	1 title	42	20	10	12	81	54

== Head-to-head record ==
The following table shows France's head-to-head record in the FIFA U-17 Women's World Cup.

Opponent	Pld	W	D	L	GF	GA	GD	Win %
Canada	2	0	1	1	2	3	−1	0.00
China	1	0	1	0	0	0	+0	0.00
Gambia	1	1	0	0	10	2	+8	100.00
Ghana	1	1	0	0	2	0	+2	100.00
Japan	3	0	0	3	1	11	−10	0.00
Netherlands	1	0	1	0	2	2	+0	0.00
Nigeria	2	1	1	0	1	0	+1	50.00
North Korea	2	0	2	0	2	2	+0	0.00
Paraguay	1	1	0	0	6	2	+4	100.00
Samoa	1	1	0	0	4	2	+2	100.00
Spain	1	0	1	0	0	0	+0	0.00
Tanzania	1	0	0	1	1	2	−1	0.00
United States	2	0	2	0	1	1	+0	0.00
Venezuela	1	1	0	0	2	0	+2	100.00
Zambia	1	1	0	0	1	0	+1	100.00
Total	21	7	9	5	35	27	+8	33.33

== See also ==
- France women's national football team
- France women's national under-19 football team
- FIFA U-17 Women's World Cup
- UEFA Women's Under-17 Championship
