= 2012 FIFA U-17 Women's World Cup =

Third edition of the FIFA U-17 Women's World Cup

FİFA U-17 Qadınlararası Dünya Çempionatı Azərbaycan 2012

Tournament details
- Host country: Azerbaijan
- Dates: 22 September – 13 October
- Teams: 16 (from 6 confederations)
- Venues: 6 (in 2 host cities)

Final positions
- Champions: France (1st title)
- Runners-up: North Korea
- Third place: Ghana
- Fourth place: Germany

Tournament statistics
- Matches played: 32
- Goals scored: 119 (3.72 per match)
- Attendance: 257,666 (8,052 per match)
- Top scorer: (North Korea) Ri Un-sim (8 goals)
- Best player: (France) Griedge Mbock Bathy
- Best goalkeeper: (France) Romane Bruneau
- Fair play award: Japan

The 2012 FIFA U-17 Women's World Cup was the third edition of the women's football tournament, and was held in Azerbaijan from 22 September to 13 October, following a decision by the executive committee on 19 March 2010. Defending champions South Korea failed to qualify for the tournament. France won the title after defeating North Korea 1–1 (7–6 after pen.).

== Qualified teams ==
Confederation	Qualifying Tournament	Qualifiers
AFC (Asia)	2011 AFC U-16 Women's Championship	China^{1} Japan; North Korea
CAF (Africa)	2012 African U-17 Women's World Cup Qualifying Tournament	Gambia^{1} Ghana; Nigeria
CONCACAF (North, Central America and Caribbean)	2012 CONCACAF Women's U-17 Championship	Canada; Mexico; United States
CONMEBOL (South America)	2012 South American Under 17 Women's Championship	Brazil; Colombia; Uruguay^{1}
OFC (Oceania)	2012 OFC Women's Under 17 Qualifying Tournament	New Zealand
UEFA (Europe)	Host nation	Azerbaijan^{1}
UEFA (Europe)	2012 UEFA Women's Under-17 Championship	France; Germany

1.Teams that made their debut.

Teams which played in final round; Teams which did not qualify; Countries which didn't take part in qualifications; Countries which are not in FIFA

== Venues ==
Originally, all four stadiums were to be located in Baku, but due to FIFA demands, two extra stadiums needed to be added. One was in the city and another in Lankaran, who hosted three games. Four of the matches were held at Tofiq Bahramov Stadium.

Baku	Lankaran	Baku
Tofiq Bahramov Stadium	Lankaran City Stadium	Eighth Kilometer District Stadium
Capacity: 31,200	Capacity: 15,000	Capacity: 11,000
Stadium	Stadium	Stadium
2012 FIFA U-17 Women's World Cup is located in Azerbaijan
Baku	Baku	Baku
Shafa Stadium	Dalga Arena	Bayil Stadium
Capacity: 8,152	Capacity: 6,700	Capacity: 5,000
Stadium	Stadium	

== Match officials ==
A total of 14 referees and 28 assistant referees were appointed by FIFA for the tournament.

Confederation	Referees	Assistant referees
AFC	(Japan) Etsuko Fukano (North Korea) Ri Hyang-ok	(North Korea) Hong Kum-nyo (Chinese Taipei) Liu Hsiu-mei (Japan) Chie Ohata (China) Zhang Lingling
CAF	(Togo) Aissata Amegee	(Ghana) Emmanuella Aglago (Uganda) Diana Mukasa (Algeria) Khadidja Belkadi
CONCACAF	(Mexico) Alondra Arellano (Barbados) Gillian Martindale (Jamaica) Cardella Samuels	(El Salvador) Elizabeth Aguilar (Dominican Republic) Milagros Leonardo (Guyana) Nykasie Liverpool (Canada) Suzanne Morisset (Honduras) Shirley Perelló (Honduras) Mady Santos
CONMEBOL	(Uruguay) Claudia Umpiérrez	(Uruguay) Luciana Mascaraña (Paraguay) Nadia Weiler
OFC	(Fiji) Finau Vulivuli	(New Zealand) Jacqueline Stephenson (Papua New Guinea) Wantin Yagum
UEFA	(Czech Republic) Jana Adámková (Hungary) Katalin Kulcsár (Ukraine) Kateryna Monzul (Scotland) Morag Pirie (Poland) Karolina Radzik-Johan (Italy) Carina Vitulano	(Netherlands) Nicolet Bakker (Greece) Ourania Foskolou (Italy) Giuliana Guarino (Greece) Panagiota Koutsoumpou (Hungary) Judit Kulcsár (Norway) Monica Løkkeberg (Azerbaijan) Ulviyya Mustafaeva (Azerbaijan) Maya Nabiyeva (Czech Republic) Lucie Ratajová (Spain) Judit Romano (Italy) Romina Santuari (Czech Republic) Adriana Šecová

== Final draw ==
The final draw was held on 6 July 2012 in Baku.

== Squads ==
Each team submitted a squad of 21 players, including three goalkeepers. The squads were announced on 14 September 2012.

== Group stage ==
The ranking of each team in each group was determined as follows:

1. greatest number of points obtained in all group matches
2. goal difference in all group matches
3. greatest number of goals scored in all group matches

If two or more teams were equal on the basis of the above three criteria, their rankings were determined as follows:

1. greatest number of points obtained in the group matches between the teams concerned
2. goal difference resulting from the group matches between the teams concerned
3. greatest number of goals scored in all group matches between the teams concerned
4. drawing of lots by the FIFA Organising Committee

The two teams finishing first and second in each group qualified for the quarter-finals.

All times are Azerbaijan Summer Time (UTC+5).

=== Group A ===
Team	Pld	W	D	L	GF	GA	GD	Pts
Nigeria	3	2	1	0	15	1	+14	7
Canada	3	2	1	0	3	1	+2	7
Colombia	3	1	0	2	4	4	0	3
Azerbaijan (H)	3	0	0	3	0	16	−16	0

22 September 2012
17:00

Nigeria	1–1	Canada
Ihezuo 81'	Report	Pierre-Louis 63'

Tofiq Bahramov Stadium, Baku
Attendance: 30,250
Referee: Kateryna Monzul (Ukraine)
22 September 2012
20:00

Azerbaijan	0–4	Colombia
	Report	Castillo 17', 20'; Maldonaldo 44'; Aguirre 73'

Tofiq Bahramov Stadium, Baku
Attendance: 30,250
Referee: Etsuko Fukano (Japan)

25 September 2012
14:00

Colombia	0–1	Canada
	Report	Clarke 51'

Shafa Stadium, Baku
Attendance: 4,729
Referee: Carina Vitulano (Italy)
25 September 2012
17:00

Azerbaijan	0–11	Nigeria
	Report	Ihezuo 5', 32', 37', 56', 70'; Ayinde 8', 24'; Biahwo 20', 74'; Yakubu 22'; Bokiri 68'

Lankaran City Stadium, Lankaran
Attendance: 10,827
Referee: Alondra Arellano (Mexico)

29 September 2012
20:00

Canada	1–0	Azerbaijan
Sanderson 48'	Report

Dalga Arena, Baku
Attendance: 5,000
Referee: Claudia Umpiérrez (Uruguay)
29 September 2012
20:00

Colombia	0–3	Nigeria
	Report	Ayinde 32', 75'; Duarte 80' (o.g.)

Bayil Stadium, Baku
Attendance: 2,500
Referee: Cardella Samuels (Jamaica)

=== Group B ===
Team	Pld	W	D	L	GF	GA	GD	Pts
North Korea	3	1	2	0	13	2	+11	5
France	3	1	2	0	11	3	+8	5
United States	3	1	2	0	7	1	+6	5
Gambia	3	0	0	3	2	27	−25	0

22 September 2012
13:00

North Korea	11–0	Gambia
Choe Yun-gyong 18'; Ri Un-sim 19', 31' (pen.), 34'; Ri Kyong-hyang 20', 63', 77'; Kim Phyong-hwa 44'; Kim So-hyang 68'; Ri Hyang-sim 87', 90+1'	Report

Eighth Kilometer District Stadium, Baku
Attendance: 9,000
Referee: Carina Vitulano (Italy)
22 September 2012
15:00

France	0–0	United States
	Report

Lankaran City Stadium, Lankaran
Attendance: 8,100
Referee: Claudia Umpiérrez (Uruguay)

25 September 2012
14:00

France	1–1	North Korea
Diani 60'	Report	Ri Un-sim 59'

Dalga Arena, Baku
Attendance: 4,200
Referee: Gillian Martindale (Barbados)
25 September 2012
17:00

United States	6–0	Gambia
Green 25' (pen.), 71'; Munerlyn 46'; Jarju 61' (o.g.); Stanton 83'; Payne 86'	Report

Dalga Arena, Baku
Attendance: 4,200
Referee: Etsuko Fukano (Japan)

29 September 2012
17:00

Gambia	2–10	France
Bah 48'; Sissohore 69'	Report	Cousin 11', 81'; Sanneh 25' (o.g.); Declercq 35', 78', 85'; Gherbi 53'; Diani 71'; Mbock Bathy 79'; Bojang 90' (o.g.)

Dalga Arena, Baku
Attendance: 5,000
Referee: Finau Vulivuli (Fiji)
29 September 2012
17:00

United States	1–1	North Korea
Jenkins 2'	Report	Ri Un-sim 4'

Bayil Stadium, Baku
Attendance: 2,500
Referee: Katalin Kulcsár (Hungary)

=== Group C ===
Team	Pld	W	D	L	GF	GA	GD	Pts
Japan	3	3	0	0	17	0	+17	9
Brazil	3	2	0	1	5	8	−3	6
Mexico	3	1	0	2	1	10	−9	3
New Zealand	3	0	0	3	3	8	−5	0

23 September 2012
15:00

Mexico	1–0	New Zealand
Pérez 36'	Report

Bayil Stadium, Baku
Attendance: 1,900
Referee: Jana Adámková (Czech Republic)
23 September 2012
18:00

Brazil	0–5	Japan
	Report	Masuya 2', 17'; Narumiya 49', 67'; Sugita 63'

Bayil Stadium, Baku
Attendance: 1,900
Referee: Katalin Kulcsár (Hungary)

26 September 2012
17:00

Mexico	0–1	Brazil
	Report	Byanca 82'

Eighth Kilometer District Stadium, Baku
Attendance: 7,000
Referee: Kateryna Monzul (Ukraine)
26 September 2012
20:00

New Zealand	0–3	Japan
	Report	Hasegawa 60', 78'; Sumida 90+3' (pen.)

Eighth Kilometer District Stadium, Baku
Attendance: 7,000
Referee: Cardella Samuels (Jamaica)

30 September 2012
14:00

Japan	9–0	Mexico
Shimizu 8'; Narumiya 18' (pen.); Shiraki 22', 29'; A. Inoue 28', 56'; Sugita 69'; Momiki 79'; Nakamura 86'	Report

Shafa Stadium, Baku
Attendance: 3,000
Referee: Morag Pirie (Scotland)
30 September 2012
14:00

New Zealand	3–4	Brazil
Jensen 4'; Ana Clara 45+1' (o.g.); Puketapu 77'	Report	Byanca 10'; Brena 26'; Andressa 35' (pen.); Camila 55'

Eighth Kilometer District Stadium, Baku
Attendance: 8,857
Referee: Ri Hyang-ok (North Korea)

=== Group D ===
Team	Pld	W	D	L	GF	GA	GD	Pts
Germany	3	2	1	0	8	4	+4	7
Ghana	3	2	0	1	8	2	+6	6
China	3	1	1	1	5	3	+2	4
Uruguay	3	0	0	3	2	14	−12	0

23 September 2012
15:00

Ghana	1–2	Germany
Ayieyam 80'	Report	Beil 13'; Bremer 19'

Dalga Arena, Baku
Attendance: 3,000
Referee: Alondra Arellano (Mexico)
23 September 2012
18:00

Uruguay	0–4	China
	Report	Tang Jiali 23'; Zhang Chen 34', 41'; Lyu Yueyun 79'

Dalga Arena, Baku
Attendance: 3,000
Referee: Morag Pirie (Scotland)

26 September 2012
17:00

Uruguay	0–5	Ghana
	Report	Ayieyam 8'; Okyere 24', 79'; Ahialey 45'; Alhassan 78'

Bayil Stadium, Baku
Attendance: 2,600
Referee: Ri Hyang-ok (North Korea)
26 September 2012
20:00

China	1–1	Germany
Miao Siwen 12'	Report	Kießling 90+4'

Bayil Stadium, Baku
Attendance: 2,600
Referee: Aissata Amegee (Togo)

30 September 2012
17:00

Germany	5–2	Uruguay
Däbritz 14', 64'; Knaak 48'; Kießling 65'; Beck 80' (pen.)	Report	Badell 42', 87'

Lankaran City Stadium, Lankaran
Attendance: 8,610
Referee: Gillian Martindale (Barbados)
30 September 2012
17:00

China	0–2	Ghana
	Report	Ayieyam 18', 88'

Eighth Kilometer District Stadium, Baku
Attendance: 8,857
Referee: Jana Adámková (Czech Republic)

== Knockout stage ==
In the knockout stage, if a match was level at the end of normal playing time, no extra time was played, with the match determined by a penalty shoot-out.

Quarter-finals
4 October – Baku (8KM)
Nigeria	0 (3)
France (p)	0 (5)
5 October – Baku (8KM)
Japan	0
Ghana	1
4 October – Baku (8KM)
North Korea	2
Canada	1
5 October – Baku (8KM)
Germany	2
Brazil	1

Semi-finals
9 October – Baku (8KM)
France	2
Ghana	0
9 October – Baku (8KM)
North Korea	2
Germany	1

Final
13 October – Baku (Tofik)
France (p)	1 (7)
North Korea	1 (6)
Third place
13 October – Baku (Tofik)
Ghana	1
Germany	0

=== Quarterfinals ===
4 October 2012
17:00

North Korea	2–1	Canada
Ri Un-sim 78', 87'	Report	Prince 90+1'

Eighth Kilometer District Stadium, Baku
Attendance: 6,852
Referee: Morag Pirie (Scotland)

4 October 2012
20:00

Nigeria	0–0	France
	Report
Penalties
Emenayo (penalty scored); Nnodim (penalty missed); Ofoegbu (penalty scored); Biahwo (penalty scored)	3–5	(penalty scored) Toletti; (penalty scored) Declercq; (penalty scored) Mbock Bathy; (penalty scored) Cascarino; (penalty scored) Romanelli

Eighth Kilometer District Stadium, Baku
Attendance: 6,852
Referee: Ri Hyang-ok (North Korea)

5 October 2012
17:00

Germany	2–1	Brazil
Däbritz 31'; Knaak 90+2'	Report	Djenifer 13'

Eighth Kilometer District Stadium, Baku
Attendance: 2,762
Referee: Alondra Arellano (Mexico)

5 October 2012
20:00

Japan	0–1	Ghana
	Report	Sumaila 53'

Eighth Kilometer District Stadium, Baku
Attendance: 2,762
Referee: Kateryna Monzul (Ukraine)

=== Semifinals ===
9 October 2012
17:00

France	2–0	Ghana
Diani 31', 89'	Report

Eighth Kilometer District Stadium, Baku
Attendance: 4,651
Referee: Cardella Samuels (Jamaica)

9 October 2012
20:00

North Korea	2–1	Germany
Kim So-hyang 39', 47'	Report	Knaak 59'

Eighth Kilometer District Stadium, Baku
Attendance: 4,651
Referee: Claudia Umpiérrez (Uruguay)

=== Third place match ===
13 October 2012
17:00

Ghana	1–0	Germany
Okyere 38'	Report

Tofiq Bahramov Stadium, Baku
Attendance: 27,128
Referee: Jana Adámková (Czech Republic)

=== Final ===
13 October 2012
20:00

France	1–1	North Korea
Declercq 33'	Report	Ri Un-sim 79'
Penalties
Toletti (penalty scored); Declercq (penalty scored); Mbock Bathy (penalty scored); Romanelli (penalty missed); Cascarino (penalty scored); Bruneau (penalty scored); Carage (penalty scored); Diani (penalty scored)	7–6	(penalty missed) Kim Un-hwa; (penalty scored) Choe Chung-bok; (penalty scored) Choe Yun-gyong; (penalty scored) Kim Hyang-mi; (penalty scored) Ri Kyong-hyang; (penalty scored) Ri Un-sim; (penalty scored) Ri Kum-suk; (penalty missed) Ri Un-yong

Tofiq Bahramov Stadium, Baku
Attendance: 27,128
Referee: Carina Vitulano (Italy)

== Winners ==
2012 FIFA U-17 Women's World Cup winners

France
First title

== Awards ==
The following awards were given for the tournament:

Golden Ball	Silver Ball	Bronze Ball
(France) Griedge Mbock Bathy	(North Korea) Ri Hyang-sim	(Japan) Yui Hasegawa

Golden Shoe	Silver Shoe	Bronze Shoe
(North Korea) Ri Un-sim	(Nigeria) Chinwendu Ihezuo	(Nigeria) Halimatu Ayinde

FIFA Fair Play Award	Golden Glove
Japan	(France) Romane Bruneau

== Goalscorers ==
8 goals

- (North Korea) Ri Un-sim

6 goals

- (Nigeria) Chinwendu Ihezuo

4 goals

- (France) Léa Declercq
- (France) Kadidiatou Diani
- (Ghana) Jane Ayieyam
- (Nigeria) Halimatu Ayinde

3 goals

- (Germany) Sara Däbritz
- (Germany) Rebecca Knaak
- (Ghana) Priscilla Okyere
- (Japan) Yui Narumiya
- (North Korea) Kim So-hyang
- (North Korea) Ri Kyong-hyang

2 goals

- (Brazil) Byanca
- (China) Zhang Chen
- (Colombia) Dayana Castillo
- (France) Pauline Cousin
- (Germany) Ricarda Kießling
- (Japan) Yui Hasegawa
- (Japan) Ayaka Inoue
- (Japan) Rika Masuya
- (Japan) Akari Shiraki
- (Japan) Hina Sugita
- (North Korea) Ri Hyang-sim
- (Nigeria) Tessy Biahwo
- (United States) Summer Green
- (Uruguay) Yamila Badell

1 goal

- (Brazil) Andressa
- (Brazil) Brena
- (Brazil) Camila
- (Canada) Summer Clarke
- (Canada) Amandine Pierre-Louis
- (Canada) Nichelle Prince
- (Canada) Valerie Sanderson
- (China) Lyu Yueyun
- (China) Miao Siwen
- (China) Tang Jiali
- (Colombia) Laura Aguirre
- (Colombia) Gabriela Maldonado
- (France) Candice Gherbi
- (France) Griedge Mbock Bathy
- (The Gambia) Penda Bah
- (The Gambia) Sainey Sissohore
- (Germany) Sharon Beck
- (Germany) Vivien Beil
- (Germany) Pauline Bremer
- (Ghana) Alberta Ahialey
- (Ghana) Fatima Alhassan
- (Ghana) Sherifatu Sumaila
- (Japan) Yuka Momiki
- (Japan) Mizuki Nakamura
- (Japan) Risa Shimizu
- (Japan) Rin Sumida
- (New Zealand) Emily Jensen
- (New Zealand) Martine Puketapu
- (North Korea) Choe Yun-gyong
- (North Korea) Kim Phyong-hwa
- (Mexico) Fernanda Pérez
- (Nigeria) Joy Bokiri
- (Nigeria) Aminat Yakubu
- (United States) Darian Jenkins
- (United States) Amber Munerlyn
- (United States) Toni Payne
- (United States) Morgan Stanton

1 Own goal

- (Brazil) Ana Clara (playing against New Zealand)
- (Colombia) Diana Duarte (playing against Nigeria)
- (The Gambia) Mariama Bojang (playing against France)
- (The Gambia) Amie Jarju (playing against United States)
- (The Gambia) Metta Sanneh (playing against France)
