= Akari Shiraki =

Japanese footballer

Personal information
- Date of birth: 4 November 1996 (age 30)
- Place of birth: Hokkaido Prefecture, Japan
- Height: 1.70 m (5 ft 7 in)
- Position: Forward

Senior career*
Years	Team	Apps	(Gls)
2015–2018	Urawa Red	52	(1)
2019–2022	MyNavi Sendai	51	(11)
- * Club domestic league appearances and goals as of 04:47, 21 March 2023 (UTC)

Akari Shiraki (born 4 November 1996) is a Japanese retired professional footballer. She last played as a forward for WE League club MyNavi Sendai.

== Club career ==
Shiraki made her WE League debut on 12 September 2021. On 25 June 2022, MyNavi Sendai announced that she retired from football.
