= 2010 FIFA U-17 Women's World Cup squads =

The following is a list of squads for each nation competing at the second FIFA U-17 Women's World Cup in Trinidad and Tobago.

Ages and club as of 5 September 2010.

== Group A ==
=== Chile ===
Coach: (Chile) Ronnie Radonich

No.	Pos.	Player	Date of birth (age)	Caps	Club
1	GK	María Troncoso	2 April 1993 (aged 17)		(Chile) Universidad Católica
2	DF	Yocelyn Cisternas	20 May 1993 (aged 17)		(Chile) Everton
3	DF	Nicole Cornejo	19 June 1993 (aged 17)		Universidad de Chile
4	DF	Camila Sáez	17 October 1994 (aged 15)		(Chile) Everton
5	DF	Leticia Torres (c)	30 May 1994 (aged 16)		(Chile) Universidad Católica
6	MF	Yorky Arriagada	31 May 1993 (aged 17)		(Chile) Santiago Morning
7	FW	Michelle Bernstein	7 July 1993 (aged 17)		(Chile) Colo-Colo
8	MF	Jetzabeth Zepeda	23 August 1993 (aged 17)		Universidad de Chile
9	FW	Yanara Aedo	5 August 1993 (aged 17)		(Chile) Colo-Colo
10	FW	Bárbara Santibáñez	23 August 1993 (aged 17)		(Chile) Colo-Colo
11	FW	Francisca Moroso	20 March 1993 (aged 17)		(Chile) Universidad Católica
12	GK	Carla Tejas	18 September 1993 (aged 16)		(Chile) Universidad Católica
13	MF	Iona Rothfeld	19 January 1993 (aged 17)		(Chile) Universidad Católica
14	FW	María José Urrutia	17 December 1993 (aged 16)		(Chile) Universidad Católica
15	DF	Isadora Cubillos	20 January 1993 (aged 17)		(Chile) Universidad Católica
16	MF	Claudia Soto	6 July 1993 (aged 17)		(Chile) Colo-Colo
17	MF	Fernanda Pinilla	6 November 1993 (aged 16)		(Chile) Universidad Católica
18	MF	Rocío Soto	21 September 1993 (aged 16)		(Chile) Colo-Colo
19	FW	Yudith Rojas	13 February 1994 (aged 16)		(Chile) Colo-Colo
20	MF	Melissa Espina	6 July 1994 (aged 16)		(Chile) Audax Italiano
21	GK	Verónica Sáez	28 April 1993 (aged 17)		(Chile) Audax Italiano

=== Nigeria ===
Coach: Peter Dedevbo

No.	Pos.	Player	Date of birth (age)	Caps	Club
1	GK	Amina Abu	8 August 1993 (aged 17)		(Nigeria) Delta Queens
2	DF	Sarah Nnodim	25 December 1995 (aged 14)		(Nigeria) Adamawa Queens
3	DF	Gladys Abasi	28 December 1995 (aged 14)		(Nigeria) Inneh Queens
4	MF	Oluchi Ofoegbu (c)	20 July 1995 (aged 15)		(Nigeria) Pelican Stars
5	DF	Chioma Alimba	22 December 1995 (aged 14)		(Nigeria) Inneh Queens
6	DF	Ugo Njoku	27 November 1994 (aged 15)		(Nigeria) Delta Queens
7	FW	Loveth Ayila	6 September 1994 (aged 15)		(Nigeria) Adamawa Queens
8	MF	Christiana Osundele	24 September 1995 (aged 14)		(Nigeria) Bayelsa Queens
9	FW	Francisca Ordega	19 October 1993 (aged 16)		(Nigeria) Sunshine Queens
10	MF	Ngozi Okobi	14 December 1993 (aged 16)		(Nigeria) Delta Queens
11	MF	Winifred Eyebhoria	14 February 1994 (aged 16)		(Nigeria) Ibom Angels
12	GK	Damiola Akano	30 December 1993 (aged 16)		(Nigeria) Sunshine Queens
13	MF	Kemi Abiodun	20 December 1994 (aged 15)		(Nigeria) Amazons Queens
14	FW	Halimatu Ayinde	16 May 1995 (aged 15)		(Nigeria) Amazons Queens
15	DF	Victoria Aidelomon	11 December 1995 (aged 14)		(Nigeria) Pelican Stars
16	FW	Jane David	10 August 1993 (aged 17)		(Nigeria) Delta Queens
17	DF	Omolade Akinbiyi	31 December 1994 (aged 15)		(Nigeria) Sunshine Queens
18	FW	Ebere Okoye	3 December 1995 (aged 14)		(Nigeria) Inneh Queens
19	FW	Yetunde Aluko	26 December 1995 (aged 14)		(Nigeria) Sunshine Queens
20	MF	Ogechi Okwaraji	1 June 1995 (aged 15)		(Nigeria) Adamawa Queens
21	GK	Ibijoke Sangonuga	20 December 1994 (aged 15)		(Nigeria) Inneh Queens

=== North Korea ===
Coach: Ri Song-gun

No.	Pos.	Player	Date of birth (age)	Caps	Club
1	GK	Choe Kyong-im	15 July 1993 (aged 17)		(North Korea) Pyongyang City Sports Club
2	DF	Song Im	31 January 1993 (aged 17)		(North Korea) Sobaeksu Sports Club
3	MF	Ri Un-gyong	11 January 1993 (aged 17)		(North Korea) Chebi Sports Club
4	DF	Kim Hyang-sim	15 November 1993 (aged 16)		(North Korea) Kyonggongop Sports Club
5	DF	Jo Jong-sim	23 June 1993 (aged 17)		(North Korea) Rimyongsu Sports Club
6	MF	Han Hyang-suk	23 December 1993 (aged 16)		(North Korea) Pyongyang City Sports Club
7	DF	Pong Son-hwa	18 February 1993 (aged 17)		(North Korea) Pyongyang City Sports Club
8	MF	Kim Yun-mi	1 July 1993 (aged 17)		(North Korea) April 25 Sports Club
9	MF	O Hui-sun (c)	22 November 1993 (aged 16)		(North Korea) Sobaeksu Sports Club
10	FW	Kim Kum-jong	23 May 1994 (aged 16)		(North Korea) Pyongyang City Sports Club
11	FW	Kim Su-gyong	4 January 1995 (aged 15)		(North Korea) April 25 Sports Club
12	MF	Choe Jong-hwa	9 April 1993 (aged 17)		(North Korea) Ponghwasan Sports Club
13	DF	Kim Nam-hui	4 March 1994 (aged 16)		(North Korea) Wangjaesan Sports Club
14	FW	Ri Yong-mi	8 May 1993 (aged 17)		(North Korea) Amrokkang Sports Club
15	DF	Kim Un-ha	23 March 1993 (aged 17)		(North Korea) Sobaeksu Sports Club
16	DF	Kang Ok-gum	10 January 1994 (aged 16)		(North Korea) Amrokkang Sports Club
17	DF	Yang Yong-sun	4 October 1993 (aged 16)		(North Korea) Pyongyang City Sports Club
18	GK	Kwak Chuk-bok	15 December 1993 (aged 16)		(North Korea) Wolmido Sports Club
19	MF	Pak Kyong-mi	8 April 1993 (aged 17)		(North Korea) April 25 Sports Club
20	GK	Rim Myong	16 September 1993 (aged 16)		(North Korea) Amrokkang Sports Club
21	MF	Rim Un-sim	1 January 1994 (aged 16)		(North Korea) Sobaeksu Sports Club

=== Trinidad and Tobago ===
Coach: (Norway) Even Pellerud

No.	Pos.	Player	Date of birth (age)	Caps	Club
1	GK	Keri Myers	11 January 1994 (aged 16)		(Trinidad and Tobago) Waterloo Starlets
2	DF	Rose Bahadursingh	27 October 1993 (aged 16)		(Canada) Ajax United Magic
3	FW	Diarra Simmons	11 September 1995 (aged 14)		(Canada) Pickering Power
4	DF	Patrice Vincent	10 April 1993 (aged 17)		(Trinidad and Tobago) Petrotrin SC
5	DF	Lauren Schmidt (c)	27 April 1993 (aged 17)		(United States) MVLA Avalanche
6	DF	Khadisha Debesette	6 January 1995 (aged 15)		(Trinidad and Tobago) Alutrint FC
7	FW	Brianna Ryce	25 January 1994 (aged 16)		(United States) Concorde Fire
8	MF	Victoria Swift	29 January 1995 (aged 15)		(Trinidad and Tobago) Waterloo Starlets
9	MF	Liana Hinds	23 February 1995 (aged 15)		(United States) Soccerplus Connecticut
10	FW	Jo Marie Lewis	11 December 1993 (aged 16)		(Trinidad and Tobago) Step By Step
11	MF	Khadidra Debesette	6 January 1995 (aged 15)		(Trinidad and Tobago) Alutrint FC
12	MF	Kayla Taylor	29 October 1994 (aged 15)		(Trinidad and Tobago) Petrotrin SC
13	FW	Nykosi Simmons	31 January 1993 (aged 17)		(Canada) Pickering Power
14	MF	Emma Abdul	17 August 1995 (aged 15)		(Canada) Brampton Rebels
15	FW	Camille Charles	1 October 1993 (aged 16)		(Trinidad and Tobago) Point Fortin Pioneers
16	DF	Rehana Omardeen	25 March 1993 (aged 17)		(Trinidad and Tobago) International School
17	DF	Jonelle Warrick	14 March 1995 (aged 15)		(Trinidad and Tobago) Trinicity Nationals
18	MF	Jasmine Sampson	21 December 1993 (aged 16)		(United States) Bethesda Freedom
19	FW	Anique Walker	4 February 1995 (aged 15)		(Trinidad and Tobago) Maple Leaf International
20	GK	Shalette Alexander	20 December 1993 (aged 16)		(Trinidad and Tobago) Waterloo Starlets
21	GK	Linfah Jones	7 February 1993 (aged 17)		(Trinidad and Tobago) Petrotrin SC

== Group B ==
=== Germany ===
Coach (Germany) Ralf Peter

No.	Pos.	Player	Date of birth (age)	Caps	Club
1	GK	Lena Nuding	18 February 1993 (aged 17)		(Germany) VfL Sindelfingen
2	DF	Claire Savin	2 April 1993 (aged 17)		(Germany) TSG 1899 Hoffenheim
3	DF	Luisa Wensing	8 February 1993 (aged 17)		(Germany) FCR 2001 Duisburg
4	DF	Kristin Demann (c)	7 April 1993 (aged 17)		(Germany) 1. FFC Turbine Potsdam
5	DF	Jennifer Cramer	24 February 1993 (aged 17)		(Germany) 1. FFC Turbine Potsdam
6	MF	Isabella Schmid	6 March 1993 (aged 17)		(Germany) SC Freiburg
7	DF	Annabel Jäger	6 January 1994 (aged 16)		(Germany) FSV Gütersloh 2009
8	MF	Lina Magull	15 August 1994 (aged 16)		(Germany) FSV Gütersloh 2009
9	FW	Kyra Malinowski	20 January 1993 (aged 17)		(Germany) SGS Essen
10	FW	Silvana Chojnowski	17 April 1994 (aged 16)		(Germany) FSV Frankfurt
11	MF	Lena Lotzen	11 September 1993 (aged 16)		(Germany) Bayern Munich
12	GK	Friederike Abt	7 July 1994 (aged 16)		(Germany) Herforder SV
13	MF	Natalie Moik	11 August 1993 (aged 17)		(Germany) Bayer 04 Leverkusen
14	MF	Melanie Leupolz	14 April 1994 (aged 16)		(Germany) SC Freiburg
15	FW	Lena Petermann	5 February 1994 (aged 16)		(Germany) Hamburger SV
16	DF	Anne Rheinheimer	26 February 1993 (aged 17)		(Germany) 1. FFC Frankfurt
17	MF	Clara Schöne	6 July 1993 (aged 17)		(Germany) Bayern Munich
18	MF	Sarah Romert	13 December 1993 (aged 16)		(Germany) Bayern Munich
19	MF	Karoline Heinze	15 October 1994 (aged 15)		(Germany) 1. FFC Turbine Potsdam
20	FW	Sandra Starke	31 July 1993 (aged 17)		(Germany) 1. FFC Turbine Potsdam
21	GK	Meike Kaemper	23 April 1994 (aged 16)		(Germany) FCR 2001 Duisburg

=== South Korea ===
Coach: Choi Duck-joo

No.	Pos.	Player	Date of birth (age)	Caps	Club
1	GK	Shim Dan-bi	18 January 1993 (aged 17)		(South Korea) Gwangyang Girls' HS
2	DF	Kim Bich-na	2 December 1993 (aged 16)		(South Korea) Hanbyeol HS
3	DF	Jang Sel-gi	31 May 1994 (aged 16)		(South Korea) Chungnam Internet HS
4	MF	Oh Da-hye	1 April 1993 (aged 17)		(South Korea) Pohang Girls' Electronic HS
5	DF	Shin Dam-yeong	2 October 1993 (aged 16)		(South Korea) Dongbu Girls' HS
6	MF	Lee Jung-eun	15 December 1993 (aged 16)		(South Korea) Haman Daesan HS
7	MF	Kim Na-ri	28 March 1993 (aged 17)		(South Korea) Hyundai Info-Tech HS
8	MF	Kim A-reum (c)	7 August 1993 (aged 16)		(South Korea) Pohang Girls' Electronic HS
9	FW	Kim Da-hye	5 June 1993 (aged 17)		(South Korea) Hyundai Info-Tech HS
10	FW	Yeo Min-ji	27 April 1993 (aged 17)		(South Korea) Haman Daesan HS
11	MF	Lee Geum-min	7 April 1994 (aged 16)		(South Korea) Hyundai Info-Tech HS
12	MF	Kim In-ji	5 July 1994 (aged 16)		(South Korea) Incheon Design HS
13	DF	Joo Soo-jin	19 September 1993 (aged 16)		(South Korea) Hyundai Info-Tech HS
14	MF	Lee So-dam	12 October 1994 (aged 15)		(South Korea) Hyundai Info-Tech HS
15	DF	Baek Eun-mi	2 June 1993 (aged 17)		(South Korea) Gwangyang Girls' HS
16	DF	Kim Soo-bin	19 January 1993 (aged 17)		(South Korea) Hyundai Info-Tech HS
17	MF	Lee Yoo-na	10 January 1994 (aged 16)		(South Korea) Gangil Girls' HS
18	GK	Kim Min-ah	27 April 1993 (aged 17)		(South Korea) Pohang Girls' Electronic HS
19	MF	Jeon Han-wool	23 October 1994 (aged 15)		(South Korea) Incheon Design HS
20	DF	Lim Ha-young	30 August 1993 (aged 16)		(South Korea) Chungnam Internet HS
21	GK	Kim Yoo-jin	10 February 1993 (aged 17)		(South Korea) Kwangyang Girls' HS

=== Mexico ===
Coach: (Mexico) Saúl Reséndiz

No.	Pos.	Player	Date of birth (age)	Caps	Club
1	GK	Rosa Mérida	31 May 1993 (aged 17)		(United States) Dallas Texans
2	DF	Amber Hernandez	14 July 1993 (aged 17)		(United States) South Valley Chivas
3	DF	Alejandra Amador	14 September 1993 (aged 16)		(United States) Irvine Strikers
4	DF	Alexandra Duran	12 September 1993 (aged 16)		(England) Arsenal
5	DF	Paulina Bueno	15 July 1993 (aged 17)		(Mexico) Tamaulipas
6	DF	Anakaren Llamas	11 March 1993 (aged 17)		(Mexico) Tlaquepaque
7	MF	Amanda Pérez	31 July 1994 (aged 16)		(United States) PSV Union
8	MF	Diana González	10 September 1993 (aged 16)		(Mexico) Toluca
9	FW	Tanya Samarzich	28 December 1994 (aged 15)		(United States) Legends
10	MF	Christina Murillo	28 January 1993 (aged 17)		(United States) Camarillo Eagles
11	MF	Andrea Sánchez	31 March 1994 (aged 16)		(Mexico) Jalisco
12	GK	Alejandra Gutiérrez	2 July 1994 (aged 16)		(Mexico) Morelos
13	DF	Cristina Ferral	16 February 1993 (aged 17)		(Mexico) Tamaulipas
14	DF	Cintia Sandoval	8 June 1993 (aged 17)		(Mexico) La Raza
15	DF	Adrianna Nuñez	17 August 1993 (aged 17)		(United States) Real So Cal
16	MF	Mariel Gutiérrez	6 August 1994 (aged 16)		(Mexico) Andrea's Soccer
17	MF	Ana Paola López	9 February 1994 (aged 16)		(Mexico) ITESEM Puebla
18	FW	Fernanda Piña	17 December 1993 (aged 16)		(Mexico) ITESEM Puebla
19	FW	Daniela Solís	19 April 1993 (aged 17)		(United States) Sherwood High School
20	GK	Karen Gomez	10 June 1993 (aged 17)		(Mexico) Tlaquepaque
21	FW	Fabiola Ibarra	2 February 1994 (aged 16)		(Mexico) Colegio Once

=== South Africa ===
Coach: Solomon Luvhengo

No.	Pos.	Player	Date of birth (age)	Caps	Club
1	GK	Nkosingiphile Zungu	30 January 1993 (aged 17)		(South Africa) Real City
2	DF	Khosi Mnyakeni	4 January 1993 (aged 17)		(South Africa) Springs Home Sweepers
3	DF	Nomvula Kgoale	20 November 1995 (aged 14)		(South Africa) Bakone Ladies
4	DF	Jabulile Mazibuko	26 January 1993 (aged 17)		(South Africa) Alexandra Ladies
5	DF	Meagan Newman	16 September 1995 (aged 14)		(South Africa) Cape Town Roses
6	DF	Octovia Nogwanya	7 March 1994 (aged 16)		(South Africa) Brazilian Ladies
7	DF	Maphuti Manamela	4 March 1993 (aged 17)		(South Africa) Dlalantombazana
8	MF	Rachel Sebati (c)	3 February 1993 (aged 17)		(South Africa) Mphahlele Ladies
9	MF	Robyn Moodaly	16 June 1994 (aged 16)		(South Africa) Stepping Stones
10	MF	Christelene Jantjies	21 November 1993 (aged 16)		(South Africa) Cape Town Spurs
11	FW	Tshegofatso Makinta	13 July 1993 (aged 17)		(South Africa) Home Sweepers
12	MF	Kelso Peskin	23 July 1995 (aged 14)		(South Africa) University of the Western Cape
13	FW	Jermaine Seoposenwe	12 October 1993 (aged 16)		(South Africa) Santos Cape Town
14	FW	Catlin Fryer	4 September 1996 (aged 13)		(United States) Patriots
15	DF	Lindiwe Mkhize	27 June 1993 (aged 17)		(South Africa) Stepping Stones
16	GK	Kaylin Swart	30 September 1994 (aged 15)		(South Africa) Springs Home Sweepers
17	FW	Alice Khosa	23 February 1994 (aged 16)		(South Africa) Mamelodi Sundowns Ladies Academy
18	MF	Aviwe Kalolo	13 November 1994 (aged 15)		(South Africa) Liverpool
19	DF	Manthipu Mabote	18 November 1994 (aged 15)		(South Africa) Bakone Ladies
20	MF	Presocious Matabologa	30 July 1993 (aged 16)		(South Africa) Cape Town Roses
21	GK	Nthabiseng Masunte	11 December 1993 (aged 16)		(South Africa) Cape Town Roses

== Group C ==
=== Spain ===
Head coach: Jorge Vilda

No.	Pos.	Player	Date of birth (age)	Caps	Club
1	GK	Lola Gallardo	10 June 1993 (aged 17)		(Spain) Sevilla
2	DF	Ana Sáenz	5 February 1993 (aged 17)		(Spain) Prainsa Zaragoza
3	DF	Ana María Catalá	20 July 1993 (aged 17)		(Spain) Rayo Vallecano
4	DF	Ivana Andrés	13 July 1994 (aged 16)		(Spain) Valencia
5	DF	Laura Gutiérrez	2 May 1994 (aged 16)		(Spain) Barcelona
6	DF	Nagore Calderón	2 June 1993 (aged 17)		(Spain) Atlético Madrid
7	MF	Gemma Gili	21 May 1994 (aged 16)		(Spain) Valencia
8	MF	Marina García	3 August 1994 (aged 16)		(Spain) Cáceres
9	FW	Paloma Lázaro	28 September 1993 (aged 16)		(Spain) Rayo Vallecano
10	FW	Amanda Sampedro	26 June 1993 (aged 17)		(Spain) Atlético Madrid
11	FW	Alexia Putellas	4 February 1994 (aged 16)		(Spain) Espanyol
12	MF	Sara Tazo	9 July 1993 (aged 17)		(Spain) Aurrerá Vitoria
13	GK	Elena Fernández	15 March 1993 (aged 17)		(Spain) Atlético Madrid
14	DF	Arene Altonaga	25 February 1993 (aged 17)		(Spain) Athletic Club
15	MF	Iraia Pérez	14 January 1994 (aged 16)		(Spain) Gasteiz Cup
16	DF	Paula Nicart	8 September 1994 (aged 15)		(Spain) Barcelona
17	MF	Sara Mérida	8 April 1993 (aged 17)		(Spain) Espanyol
18	FW	Raquel Pinel	30 August 1994 (aged 16)		(Spain) Real Jaén
19	DF	Paula López	4 July 1994 (aged 16)		(Spain) Atlético Madrid
20	MF	Nerea Pérez	11 January 1994 (aged 16)		(Spain) Plaza Argel
20	GK	Patricia Asensio	6 February 1993 (aged 17)		(Spain) Badajoz

=== Japan ===
Head coach: Hiroshi Yoshida

No.	Pos.	Player	Date of birth (age)	Caps	Club
1	GK	Eri Hirao	28 January 1993 (aged 17)		(Japan) Seiwa Gakuen H.S
2	DF	Serina Kashimoto	9 January 1993 (aged 17)		(Japan) Fujieda Junshin H.S
3	DF	Mami Kanazawa	3 August 1993 (aged 17)		(Japan) Tokoha Gakuen Tachibana H.S
4	DF	Yume Nagasawa	6 April 1993 (aged 17)		(Japan) NTV Menina
5	DF	Naoko Wada	24 May 1993 (aged 17)		(Japan) JFA Academy Fukushima
6	MF	Ayu Nakada	15 August 1993 (aged 17)		(Japan) Tokiwagi Gakuen H.S
7	MF	Hikaru Naomoto	3 March 1994 (aged 16)		(Japan) Fukuoka J. Anclas
8	MF	Yoko Tanaka	30 July 1993 (aged 17)		(Japan) JFA Academy Fukushima
9	MF	Haruna Kawashima	12 April 1993 (aged 17)		(Japan) JFA Academy Fukushima
10	FW	Mai Kyokawa	28 December 1993 (aged 16)		(Japan) Tokiwagi Gakuen H.S
11	FW	Mina Tanaka	28 April 1994 (aged 16)		(Japan) NTV Menina
12	GK	Arisa Mochizuki	15 April 1994 (aged 16)		(Japan) NTV Menina
13	DF	Tomoko Muramatsu	23 October 1994 (aged 15)		(Japan) NTV Menina
14	MF	Haruka Hamada	26 January 1993 (aged 17)		(Japan) JFA Academy Fukushima
15	MF	Hikari Takagi	21 May 1993 (aged 17)		(Japan) Tokoha Gakuen Tachibana H.S
16	MF	Chika Kato	28 February 1994 (aged 16)		(Japan) Urawa Red Diamonds
17	FW	Kumi Yokoyama	13 August 1993 (aged 17)		(Japan) Jumonji H.S
18	FW	Yuka Honda	13 June 1993 (aged 17)		(Japan) JFA Academy Fukushima
19	FW	Aya Goto	9 December 1993 (aged 16)		(Japan) Tokoha Gakuen Tachibana H.S
20	DF	Hikari Nagashima	20 December 1993 (aged 16)		(Japan) Urawa Red Diamonds
21	GK	Isayo Mita	16 March 1993 (aged 17)		(Japan) Kyoto Seika Joshi H.S

=== New Zealand ===
Head coach: (England) Dave Edmondson

No.	Pos.	Player	Date of birth (age)	Caps	Club
1	GK	Chloe-May Geurts	20 June 1993 (aged 17)		(New Zealand) Hawera
2	DF	Rachel Head	12 December 1993 (aged 16)		(New Zealand) Metro
3	DF	Tessa McPherson	16 May 1993 (aged 17)		(New Zealand) Lynn-Avon United
4	MF	Olivia Chance	5 October 1993 (aged 16)		(New Zealand) Claudelands Rovers
5	FW	Brittany Dudley-Smith	8 November 1993 (aged 16)		(New Zealand) Eastern Suburbs AFC
6	MF	Evie Millynn	23 November 1994 (aged 15)		(New Zealand) Eastern Suburbs AFC
7	MF	Holly Patterson	16 April 1994 (aged 16)		(New Zealand) Claudelands Rovers
8	MF	Kate Loye	15 May 1993 (aged 17)		(New Zealand) Claudelands Rovers
9	MF	Hannah Carlsen	25 November 1995 (aged 14)		(New Zealand) Metro
10	FW	Hannah Wong	11 October 1993 (aged 16)		(New Zealand) Three Kings United
11	FW	Grace Parkinson	29 March 1994 (aged 16)		(New Zealand) Claudelands Rovers
12	FW	Steph Skilton	27 October 1994 (aged 15)		(New Zealand) Three Kings United
13	DF	Megan Lee	7 February 1995 (aged 15)		(New Zealand) Lynn-Avon United
14	DF	Katie Bowen (c)	15 April 1994 (aged 16)		(New Zealand) Glenfield Rovers
15	DF	Kate Carlton	21 July 1993 (aged 17)		(New Zealand) Claudelands Rovers
16	MF	Jessie Mathews	4 June 1994 (aged 16)		(New Zealand) Three Kings United
17	DF	Sivitha Boyce	21 October 1994 (aged 15)		(New Zealand) Metro
18	MF	Rebecca Burrows	29 August 1994 (aged 16)		(New Zealand) Metro
19	DF	Michelle Windsor	10 December 1993 (aged 16)		(New Zealand) Metro
20	GK	Jess Reddaway	12 January 1994 (aged 16)		(New Zealand) Metro
21	GK	Lily Alfeld	4 August 1995 (aged 15)		(New Zealand) Coastal Spirit FC

=== Venezuela ===
Head coach: (Panama) Kenneth Zseremeta

No.	Pos.	Player	Date of birth (age)	Caps	Club
1	GK	Maleike Pacheco	20 October 1993 (aged 16)		Universidad Central de Venezuela FC
2	DF	Génesis Moreno	3 May 1993 (aged 17)		(Venezuela) La Fría
3	DF	Yaribeth Ulacio	10 January 1993 (aged 17)		(Venezuela) Estudiantes de Guarico
4	DF	Soleidys Rengel	3 December 1993 (aged 16)		(Venezuela) Unión Atlético Piar
5	MF	Yurimar Toledo	25 February 1993 (aged 17)		(United States) Mickey Sport
6	DF	María Eugenia Rodríguez	26 November 1994 (aged 15)		(Venezuela) Caracas FC
7	FW	Paola Villamizar	30 June 1994 (aged 16)		(Venezuela) Colegio Centro América
8	MF	María Carrero	14 March 1993 (aged 17)		(Venezuela) Universidad de Los Andes
9	FW	Ysaura Viso	17 June 1993 (aged 17)		(Venezuela) Estudiantes de Guarico
10	MF	Marialba Zambrano (captain)	17 June 1995 (aged 15)		(Venezuela) Caracas
11	MF	Michelle Clemente	7 December 1994 (aged 15)		(Venezuela) Market
12	GK	Nathaly Natera	11 January 1993 (aged 17)		(Venezuela) Pedagogico
13	GK	Orliany Marcano	4 January 1995 (aged 15)		(Venezuela) Mickey Sport
14	MF	Natasha Rosas	21 August 1993 (aged 17)		(Venezuela) Mickey Sport
15	MF	Anna Alvarado	23 July 1994 (aged 16)		(Venezuela) La Fría
16	DF	Génesis Moncada	21 September 1993 (aged 16)		Universidad Central de Venezuela FC
17	MF	Maryeling Martínez	14 January 1995 (aged 15)		(Venezuela) Unión Atlético Piar
18	FW	Joemar Guarecuco	20 June 1994 (aged 16)		(Venezuela) Barinas
19	MF	Silvana Aron	10 October 1994 (aged 15)		Universidad Central de Venezuela FC
20	MF	Jessyca Montes	17 April 1993 (aged 17)		(Venezuela) Universidad de Los Andes
21	MF	Wendy Padilla	28 July 1993 (aged 17)		(Venezuela) La Fría

== Group D ==
=== Brazil ===
Head coach: Edvaldo Erlacher

No.	Pos.	Player	Date of birth (age)	Caps	Club
1	GK	Dani Neuhaus	21 May 1993 (aged 17)		(Brazil) Foz do Iguaçu
2	DF	Tainara	15 November 1993 (aged 16)		(Brazil) CBF
3	DF	Ingrid Pardal	8 October 1993 (aged 16)		(Brazil) CA Juventus
4	DF	Caroline	14 May 1993 (aged 17)		(Brazil) Coritiba FC
5	MF	Lucimara	14 April 1993 (aged 17)		(Brazil) Itumirim EC
6	DF	Roberta Schroeder	15 January 1993 (aged 17)		(Brazil) CBF
7	MF	Benícia	7 April 1993 (aged 17)		(Brazil) Kindermann Futebol
8	MF	Andressinha	1 May 1995 (aged 15)		(Brazil) EC Pelotas
9	FW	Paula Vicenzo	9 July 1993 (aged 17)		(Brazil) Santos FC
10	MF	Bia Zaneratto	17 December 1993 (aged 16)		(Brazil) Santos FC
11	MF	Thaisinha (c)	20 January 1993 (aged 17)		(Brazil) Santos FC
12	GK	Letícia Izidoro	13 August 1994 (aged 16)		(Brazil) Kindermann Futebol
13	DF	Lílian	11 January 1993 (aged 17)		(Brazil) Campo Grande AC
14	DF	Rayanne Machado	16 June 1994 (aged 16)		(Brazil) Kindermann Futebol
15	FW	Glaucia	30 January 1993 (aged 17)		(Brazil) São Bernardo FC
16	DF	Jucinara	3 August 1993 (aged 17)		(Brazil) Porto Alegre FC
17	MF	Bianca	28 October 1993 (aged 16)		(Brazil) Porto Alegre FC
18	MF	Naomi	11 July 1995 (aged 15)		(Brazil) CA Juventus
19	FW	Tati Nepomuceno	30 April 1993 (aged 17)		(Brazil) CBF
20	MF	Luana Bertolucci	2 May 1993 (aged 17)		(Brazil) São Caetano
21	GK	Nicole	14 August 1995 (aged 15)		(Brazil) Team Chicago Brasil

=== Canada ===
Coach (Canada) Bryan Rosenfeld

No.	Pos.	Player	Date of birth (age)	Caps	Club
1	GK	Rachelle Beanlands	11 May 1993 (aged 17)		(Canada) Ottawa Fury
2	DF	Sophie Thérien	4 April 1993 (aged 17)		(Canada) Lakers du Lac Saint-Louis
3	MF	Jade Kovacevic	10 April 1994 (aged 16)		(Canada) Oakville SC
4	MF	Chantale Campbell	9 January 1994 (aged 16)		(Canada) North London
5	MF	Ashley Lawrence	11 June 1995 (aged 15)		(Canada) Erin Mills
6	DF	Yazmin Ongtengco-Hintzen	23 July 1993 (aged 17)		(Canada) Ajax United
7	MF	Kylie Davis	22 July 1994 (aged 16)		(Canada) Lakers du Lac Saint-Louis
8	MF	Diamond Simpson	28 April 1993 (aged 17)		(Canada) Dixie Dragons
9	FW	Nour Ghoneim	13 June 1993 (aged 17)		(Canada) Richmond Hill
10	DF	Vanessa Kovacs	4 November 1993 (aged 16)		(Canada) Vancouver Whitecaps FC
11	DF	Alison Clarke	23 March 1993 (aged 17)		(Canada) World Soccer Academy
12	DF	Nicole Setterlund (c)	16 February 1993 (aged 17)		(Canada) Vancouver Whitecaps FC
13	MF	Kinley McNicoll	17 April 1994 (aged 16)		(Canada) Burlington Heat
14	FW	Zakiya McIntosh	3 February 1993 (aged 17)		(Canada) Ajax United
15	FW	Haisha Cantave	3 June 1993 (aged 17)		(Canada) Ottawa Fury
16	DF	Charlène Achille	18 March 1994 (aged 16)		(Canada) CS Longueuil
17	DF	Ally Courtnall	26 June 1993 (aged 17)		(Canada) Eagles SC
18	GK	Sabrina D'Angelo	11 May 1993 (aged 17)		(Canada) Toronto Lady Lynx
19	FW	Caroline Beaulne	30 April 1994 (aged 16)		(Canada) CS Longueuil
20	GK	Eve Badana	9 July 1993 (aged 17)		(Canada) Toronto Lady Lynx
21	FW	Abigail Raymer	5 January 1993 (aged 17)		(Canada) Vancouver Whitecaps FC

=== Ghana ===
Head coach: Abrahams Allotey

No.	Pos.	Player	Date of birth (age)	Caps	Club
1	GK	Ayishetu Simpson	1 October 1993 (aged 16)		(Ghana) Ideal Ladies
2	DF	Cynthia Boakye-Yiadom	25 December 1994 (aged 15)		(Ghana) Fabulous Ladies
3	DF	Grace Adams	2 November 1995 (aged 14)		(Ghana) Post Ladies
4	DF	Linda Addai	12 December 1995 (aged 14)		(Ghana) Soccer Intellectual Ladies
5	DF	Ellen Coleman	11 December 1995 (aged 14)		(Ghana) Ghatel Ladies Accra
6	MF	Felicia Owusu Djabaah	18 September 1994 (aged 15)		(Ghana) Nungua Ladies
7	FW	Sherifatu Sumaila	30 November 1996 (aged 13)		(Ghana) Lepo Stars Ladies
8	MF	Priscilla Okyere	6 June 1995 (aged 15)		(Ghana) Fabulous Ladies
9	FW	Rita Okyere	14 July 1993 (aged 17)		(Ghana) Ghatel Ladies Accra
10	MF	Beatrice Adawoed Sesu (c)	27 November 1995 (aged 14)		(Ghana) Post Ladies
11	FW	Alice Eva Danso	25 December 1994 (aged 15)		(Ghana) Ghatel Ladies Accra
12	MF	Mary Essiful	22 June 1993 (aged 17)		(Ghana) Soccer Intellectual Ladies
13	MF	Jennifer Cudjoe	7 March 1994 (aged 16)		(Ghana) Hasaacas Ladies
14	DF	Regina Antwi	26 November 1995 (aged 14)		(Ghana) Vodafone Ladies
15	FW	Kesewa Comfort Antwi	11 October 1996 (aged 13)		(Ghana) Fabulous Ladies
16	GK	Margaret Otoo	1 September 1993 (aged 17)		(Ghana) Ghatel Ladies Accra
17	FW	Kasira Malik-Jebdon	23 November 1995 (aged 14)		(Ghana) Vodafone Ladies
18	DF	Rebecca Asante	16 October 1994 (aged 15)		(Ghana) Vodafone Ladies
19	DF	Ivy Kolli	17 January 1996 (aged 14)		(Ghana) Cougans Ladies
20	MF	Rashida Abdul-Rahman	28 November 1996 (aged 13)		(Ghana) Lepo Stars Ladies
21	GK	Sawude Issah	24 November 1995 (aged 14)		(Ghana) Post Ladies

=== Republic of Ireland ===
Coach (Republic of Ireland) Noel King

No.	Pos.	Player	Date of birth (age)	Caps	Club
1	GK	Grace Moloney	1 March 1993 (aged 17)		(England) Reading
2	DF	Ciara O'Brien	13 February 1993 (aged 17)		(Republic of Ireland) Tramore FC
3	DF	Megan Campbell	28 June 1993 (aged 17)		(Republic of Ireland) St Francis
4	DF	Jessica Gleeson	23 October 1993 (aged 16)		(Republic of Ireland) Tramore FC
5	DF	Jennifer Byrne	5 March 1993 (aged 17)		(Republic of Ireland) Bealnamulla
6	MF	Ciara Grant (c)	11 June 1993 (aged 17)		(Republic of Ireland) Kilmacrennan Celtic
7	MF	Aileen Gilroy	1 March 1993 (aged 17)		(Republic of Ireland) Killala
8	MF	Dora Gorman	18 February 1993 (aged 17)		(Republic of Ireland) Salthill Devon
9	DF	Zoe Boyd	26 February 1993 (aged 17)		(United States) Montclair Thunderbolts
10	FW	Denise O'Sullivan	4 February 1994 (aged 16)		(Republic of Ireland) Wilton United
11	FW	Siobhán Killeen	15 March 1993 (aged 17)		(Republic of Ireland) Raheny United
12	MF	Stacie Donnelly	7 June 1993 (aged 17)		(England) Reading
13	FW	Rianna Jarrett	5 July 1993 (aged 17)		(Republic of Ireland) Northend United
14	DF	Tanya Kennedy	8 July 1993 (aged 17)		(Northern Ireland) Finn Valley
15	DF	Kerry Glynn	14 April 1993 (aged 17)		(United States) Montclair Thunderbolts
16	GK	Amanda Budden	9 May 1994 (aged 16)		(Republic of Ireland) Wilton United
17	FW	Clare Shine	18 May 1995 (aged 15)		(Republic of Ireland) Douglas Hall
18	DF	Harriet Scott	10 February 1993 (aged 17)		(England) Reading
19	FW	Rebecca Kearney	29 April 1994 (aged 16)		(Republic of Ireland) Lakewood Athletic
20	GK	Jillian Maloney	25 January 1995 (aged 15)		(United States) Roswell Santos
21	MF	Emma Hansberry	26 May 1994 (aged 16)		(Republic of Ireland) Strand Celtic
