= Leonie Doege =

German footballer

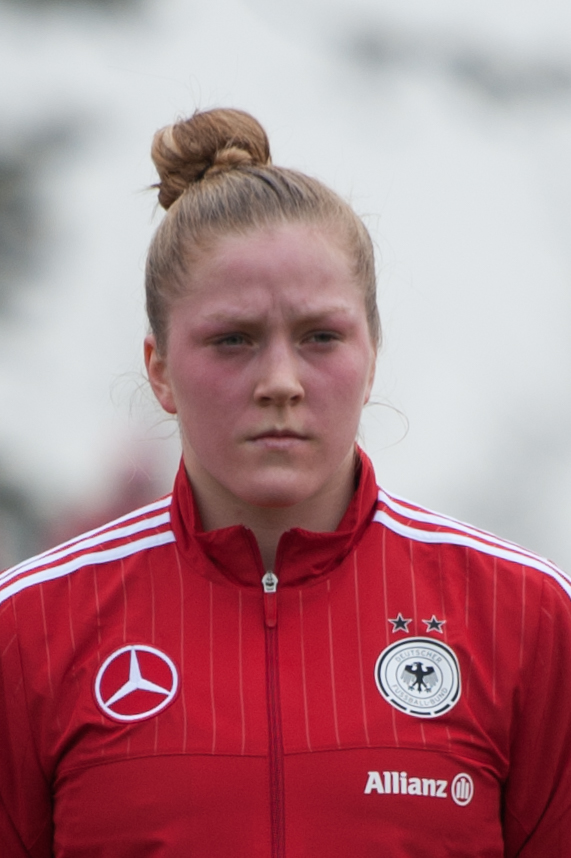

Personal information
- Full name: Leonie Elisabeth Doege
- Date of birth: 20 February 1999 (age 27)
- Place of birth: Düsseldorf, Germany
- Height: 1.67 m (5 ft 6 in)
- Position: Goalkeeper

College career
Years	Team	Apps	(Gls)
2017–2018	Butler Bulldogs		

Senior career*
Years	Team	Apps	(Gls)
- VfL Bochum

International career
2014–2015	Germany U16	6	(0)
2016	Germany U17	12	(0)
2017	Germany U19	2	(0)
- * Club domestic league appearances and goals

Leonie Elisabeth Doege (born 20 February 1999) is a German footballer who plays as a goalkeeper for VfL Bochum.

== International career ==
Doege has represented Germany at youth level.

== Honours ==
Twente

- Eredivisie: 2023–24
- Eredivisie Cup: 2023–24
- Dutch Women's Super Cup: 2023

Germany U17

- UEFA Women's Under-17 Championship: 2016
