= Dimitrios Pappas =

Greek footballer and manager (born 1980)

Dimi Pappas
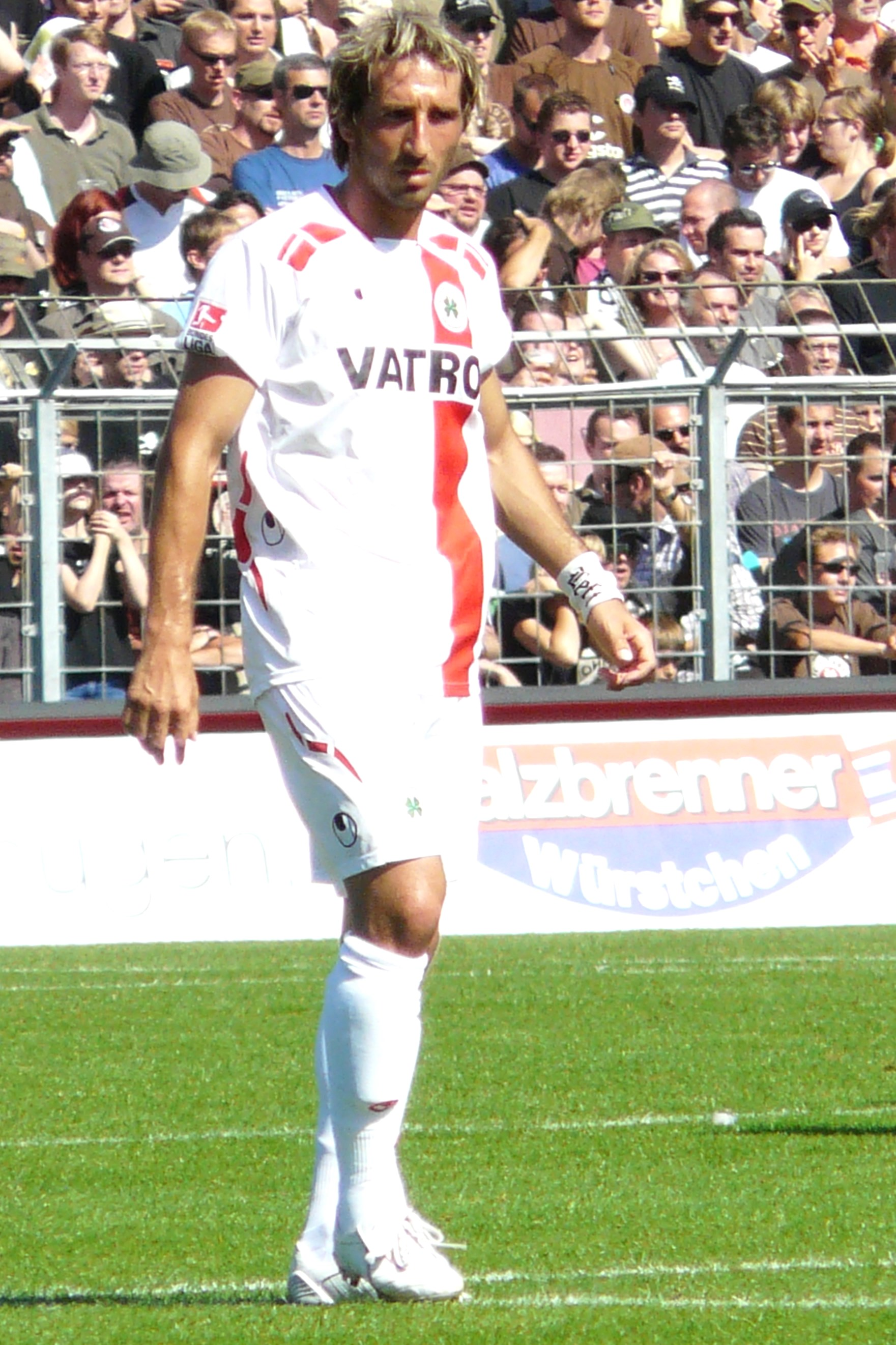
- Pappas in 2008

Personal information
- Full name: Dimitrios Pappas
- Date of birth: 25 February 1980 (age 46)
- Place of birth: Ioannina, Greece
- Height: 1.80 m (5 ft 11 in)
- Position: Defender

Youth career
- 1995–2000: SC Plettenberg
- 2000–2003: Rot-Weiß Lüdenscheid
- 2003–2004: Sportfr. Oestrich-Iserlohn

Senior career*
| Years | Team | Apps | (Gls) |
| 2004–2005 | SSV Hagen | | |
| 2005–2006 | Rot-Weiss Essen | 1 | (0) |
| 2006–2012 | Rot-Weiß Oberhausen | 156 | (4) |
| 2012–2015 | SSVg Velbert | 82 | (8) |
| 2015 | SpVgg Erkenschwick | 6 | (0) |
| 2016–2017 | Rot-Weiß Oberhausen II | 17 | (0) |

Managerial career
- 2016–2017: Rot-Weiß Oberhausen II
- 2017–2020: Rot-Weiß Oberhausen U19
- 2020: Rot-Weiß Oberhausen
- 2021–2022: VfL Bochum (women)
- 2022–2024: SSVg Velbert
- * Club domestic league appearances and goals as of 4 November 2012

Dimitrios Pappas (Greek: Δημήτριος Παππάς; born 25 February 1980 in Ioannina) is a Greek former footballer and current football manager.

== Managerial career ==
Pappas managed Rot-Weiß Oberhausen in 2020. He later coached VfL Bochum (women) in 2021–22.

== Personal life ==
He starred alongside his girlfriend Rebecca Fuhrländer in the German Scripted Reality show "mieten, kaufen, wohnen".
