= Isabel Hochstein =

German footballer (born 1994)

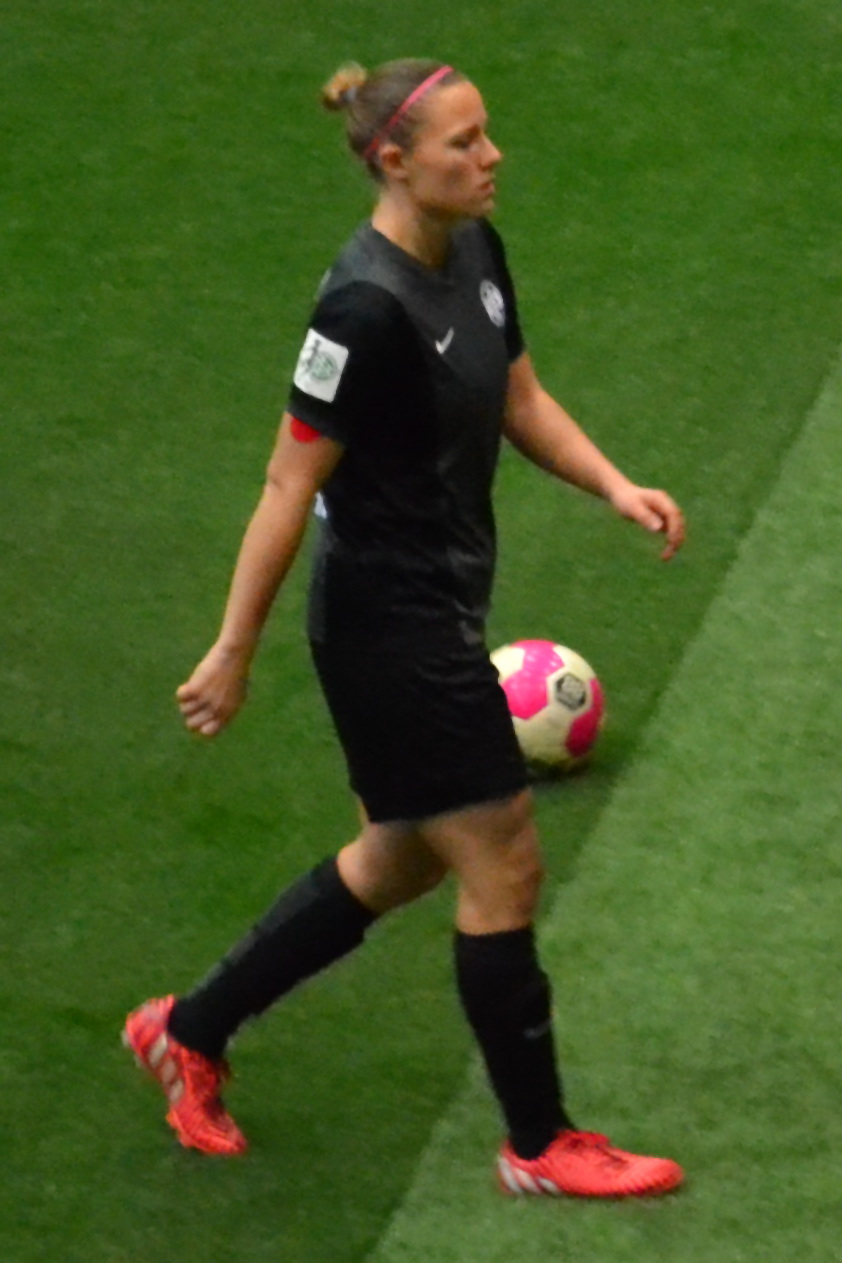

Personal information
- Date of birth: 20 April 1994 (age 32)
- Place of birth: Duisburg, Germany
- Height: 1.70 m (5 ft 7 in)
- Position: Midfielder

Team information
- Current team: MSV Duisburg

Senior career*
Years	Team	Apps	(Gls)
2010–2012	FCR 2001 Duisburg	1	(0)
2014–2019	SGS Essen	44	(1)
2019–2021	MSV Duisburg	30	(0)
2021–2023	Borussia Bocholt	11	(0)
2025–	MSV Duisburg		
- * Club domestic league appearances and goals

Isabel Hochstein (born 20 April 1994) is a German footballer who plays as a midfielder for MSV Duisburg.
