= Rachel Sebati =

South African soccer player (born 1993)

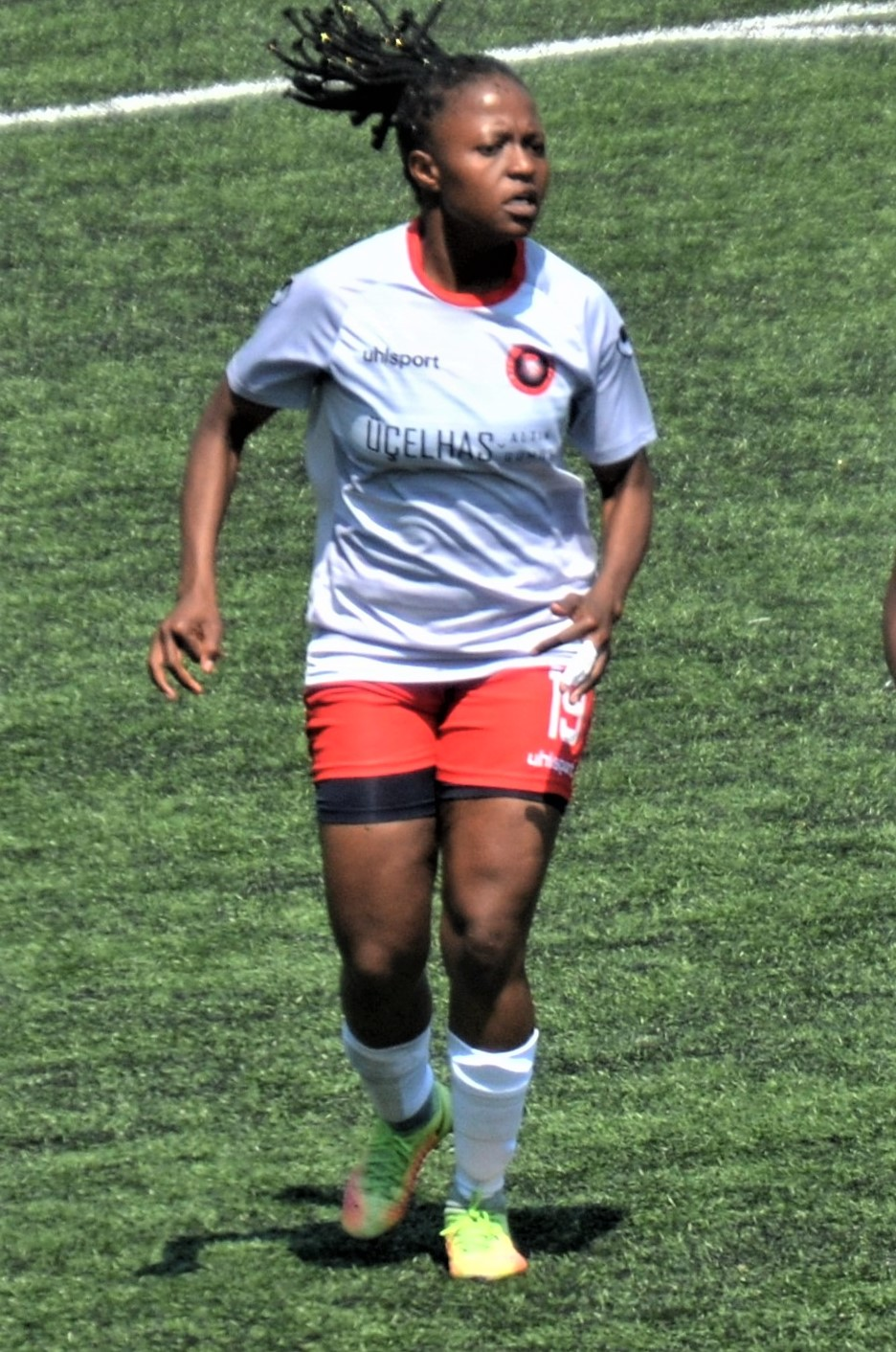
- Rachel Sebati of Fatih Vatan Spor (May 2022)

Personal information
- Full name: Rachel Raesetja Sebati
- Date of birth: 3 February 1993 (age 33)
- Place of birth: Limpopo, South Africa
- Height: 1.57 m (5 ft 2 in)
- Position: Midfielder

Team information
- Current team: Fatih Vatan Spor
- Number: 19

Senior career*
| Years | Team | Apps | (Gls) |
| 2010 | Mphahlele Ladies | | |
- TUT Ladies
| 2019 | Minsk | 1 | (0) |
| 2019–2020 | ALG Spor | 11 | (1) |
| 2020– | Fatih Vatan Spor | 40 | (2) |

International career
| 2010 | South Africa U-17 | 3 | (0) |
| 2017 | South Africa | | |
- * Club domestic league appearances and goals as of 5 February 2023

Rachel Raesetja Sebati (born 3 February 1993) is a South African soccer player who plays as a midfielder for Turkish Women's Football Super League club Fatih Vatan Spor. She has represented South Africa at under-17 and senior levels.

== Early life ==
Sebati was born in Limpopo, South Africa on 3 February 1993.

== Club career ==
Sebati was a member of Mphahlele Ladies FC in her country. Later, she played for TUT Ladies, and captained the team.

Nadia Kroll, the assistant coach of TUT Ladies, offered Sebati and her teammate Letago Madiba to play in Belarus. She had to decide within three days as the Belarusian club was in preparation for a major European tournament. She moved to Belarus in July 2019, and signed with ZFK Minsk two weeks before their participation at the 2019–20 UEFA Women's Champions League qualifying round. She appeared in two matches in August 2019 for the Belarusian team at Group 4 of the 2019–20 UEFA Women's Champions League qualifying round.

End October 2019, Sebati went to Turkey, arranged by her manager Kroll, and joined ALG Spor, a club in Gaziantep, which would play the second season in the Women's First League after their promotion. She scored one goal in eleven matches of the 2019-20 Turkish Women's First Football League season. The 2019–20 league season was stopped due to the COVID-19 pandemic in Turkey. However, her team was named by the Turkish Football Federation to represent Turkey at the 2020–21 UEFA Women's Champions League as the top-ranking team when the league was stopped.

In the [[2020-21 Turk sh Women's Football League|2020–21 Turkish Women's League]] season, she transferred to Fatih Vatan Spor.

== International career ==
Sebati played as captain of her national team South Africa girls' U-17 in all three matches of the 2010 FIFA U-17 Women's World Cup – Group B. She captained the national U-17 team at the competition.

Sebati was part of the South Africa women's national team, nicknamed "Banyana Banyana", and a regular member in 2017. She played at the 2017 COSAFA Women's Championship – Group C matches.

== Career statistics ==
As of 5 February 20232

| Club | Season | League | | | Continental | | National | | Total | |
| Club | Season | Division | Apps | Goals | Apps | Goals | Apps | Goals | Apps | Goals |
|---|---|---|---|---|---|---|---|---|---|---|
| ALG Spor | 2019–20 | First League | 11 | 1 | – | – | 0 | 0 | 11 | 1 |
| ALG Spor | Total | | 11 | 1 | – | – | 0 | 0 | 11 | 1 |
| Fatih Vatan Spor | 2020–21 | First League | 6 | 2 | – | – | 0 | 0 | 6 | 2 |
| Fatih Vatan Spor | 2021–22 | Super League | 22 | 0 | – | – | 0 | 0 | 22 | 0 |
| Fatih Vatan Spor | 2022–23 | Super League | 12 | 0 | – | – | 0 | 0 | 12 | 0 |
| Fatih Vatan Spor | Total | | 40 | 2 | – | – | 0 | 0 | 40 | 2 |

== Honours ==
Turkish Women's First League

Fatih Vatan Spor
Runners-up (1): 2020–21
