= Kelsey Vogel =

American soccer player

Personal information
- Full name: Kelsey Vogel
- Date of birth: September 15, 1998 (age 28)
- Place of birth: Centennial, Colorado
- Height: 1.70 m (5 ft 7 in)
- Position: Defender

College career
Years	Team	Apps	(Gls)
2016–2019	Seattle Redhawks	70	(4)

Senior career*
Years	Team	Apps	(Gls)
2021–2022	MSV Duisburg	19	(3)
- * Club domestic league appearances and goals

Kelsey Vogel (born September 15, 1998) is an American professional soccer player who plays as a defender for MSV Duisburg of the German Frauen-Bundesliga.
