= VfL Bochum (women) =

- Full name: Verein für Leibesübungen Bochum 1848 Fußballgemeinschaft e. V.
- Founded: 1 July 2010; 16 years ago
- Ground: Lohrheidestadion
- Capacity: 16,387
- CEO: Ilja Kaenzig
- Manager: Kyra Malinowski
- League: 2. Frauen-Bundesliga
- 2025–26: 2. Bundesliga, 9th of 14
Home colours	Away colours	Third colours

VfL Bochum is a women's association football club from Bochum, Germany. It is part of the VfL Bochum club.

== History ==
VfL Bochum began its cooperation with TuS Harpen on July 1, 2008. TuS Harpen competed in the Regionalliga until its acquisition by VfL Bochum on July 1, 2010. During this period, another Bochum-based club, SG Wattenscheid 09, faced financial difficulties and dissolved, leading all their players to join the newly formed VfL Bochum women's team.

In their first two seasons in the Regionalliga West, VfL Bochum finished as runners-up. They became champions in their third season, earning promotion to the 2. Bundesliga.

On October 1, 2014, VfL Bochum 1848 announced that it would disband its women's football division at the end of the 2014–15 season to save 120,000 euros annually. This decision was met with sharp criticism from VfL fans. The fan club unserVfL.de stated in an open letter that the board's decision "cannot be reconciled with the values of the club" and accused the board of "trampling on social responsibility." However, on October 20, 2014, an extraordinary general meeting decided to retain the women's football division.

Despite this, the club withdrew the team from the 2014–15 2. Bundesliga, even though they had a mid-table finish. In the Regionalliga West, VfL Bochum finished as runners-up behind Borussia Bocholt in the 2017–18 season. Since June 20, 2018, the department has had a cooperation with the Swiss club FC Oerlikon Polizei Zürich, which includes an exchange of coaches and players.

The club remained in the Regionalliga West until they became champions of the 2023–24 season, earning promotion back to the 2. Bundesliga, following a 6–3 victory on aggregate over Mainz in the promotion play-off final.

== Squad ==
As of 18 October 2025

Note: Flags indicate national team as defined under FIFA eligibility rules; some limited exceptions apply. Players may hold more than one non-FIFA nationality.

No.	Pos.	Nation	Player
1	GK	GER	Kari Närdemann
2	DF	GER	Antonia Haase
5	MF	GER	Lilian Huber
7	MF	GER	Mara Kanoğlu
9	FW	GER	Dörthe Hoppius (captain)
10	MF	GER	Anna Moczarski
14	MF	AUS	Lara Kirkby
15	DF	NED	Jana Heinen
16	MF	GER	Emely Joester
17	DF	POR	Ana Leite
18	GK	GER	Svea Resing
19	MF	GER	Fiona Gaißer
20	DF	GER	Amelie Fölsing
21	FW	POR	Anna Marques

No.	Pos.	Nation	Player
23	FW	GER	Nina Lange
24	FW	GER	Alina Angerer
25	DF	SUI	Leana Zaugg
26	GK	GER	Sarah Rolle
27	MF	GER	Sarah Freutel
30	MF	GER	Lilith Schmidt
31	DF	GER	Franziska Wenzel
34	GK	GER	Anne Moll
—	DF	NED	Ebla Gouriye
—	DF	USA	Adrienne Jordan
—	DF	GER	Bente Fischer
—	MF	GER	Noemi Gentile
—	MF	GER	Ida Daedelow
—	FW	JPN	Rana Okuma

=== Former players ===
- Oliwia Wos
- Ajla Balic
- Giorgia Irmici

== Coaching history ==
Coach	Tenure
(Germany) Roger Dorny	1 July 2010 – 30 March 2011
(Germany) Thomas Reis	30 March 2011 – 30 June 2011
(Germany) Arthur Matlik	1 July 2011 – 30 June 2013
(Germany) Sabrina Gesell	1 July 2013 – 30 June 2015
(Germany) Andreas Billetter	1 July 2015 – 18 April 2016
(Germany) Heiko Küpper	19 April 2016 – 30 June 2017
(Germany) Maik Büsser	1 July 2017 – 7 November 2018
(Germany) Kelly Lorent	7 November 2018 – 19 November 2018
(Germany) Paul Müller	19 November 2018 – 30 June 2021
(Greece) Dimitrios Pappas	12 July 2021 – 31 July 2022
(Germany) Kyra Malinowski	1 August 2022 – present
