= Renofa Yamaguchi FC Ladies =

Japanese women's football club

Renofa Yamaguchi FC Ladies レノファ山口FCレディース
- Full name: Renofa Yamaguchi FC Ladies
- Founded: 2008; 18 years ago
- Manager: Shota Akamine
- League: Chugoku Women's Football League
- 2024: Chugoku Women's Football League , 2rd of 10
- Website: https://www.renofa.com/ladies2024/

Renofa Yamaguchi FC Ladies (レノファ山口FCレディース,Renofa Yamaguchi FC Redeisu) is a women's football team founded in 2008. Previously known as Reone Yamaguchi Ladies (レオーネ山口レディース), the club became an affiliated team to Renofa Yamaguchi FC in 2015 and was renamed to its current name. The club plays in the Chugoku Women's Football League, the 4th tier of the Japanese League System.

The club represents the Yamaguchi Prefecture (山口県). The club aims to be promoted to the Nadeshiko League. The club has passed the Nadeshiko League 2 application process 3 times in a row since 2022 and played in the Nadeshiko League qualifiers but has failed to make it to the playoffs.

== 2025 season ==
Prior to the start of the 2025 season, the club signed former national team player Yoko Tanaka as their first professional player in club history. They aim to progress to the promotion/relegation game to advance to the Nadeshiko League 2 without conceding any goals during their 2025 league games. As of the halfway point in the season, they have been successful in this aim, winning their first 9-season games without conceding a point.

== Current squad ==
As of 31 January 2025.

Note: Flags indicate national team as defined under FIFA eligibility rules; some limited exceptions apply. Players may hold more than one non-FIFA nationality.

No.	Pos.	Nation	Player
2	DF	JPN	Akina Isoda
3	DF	JPN	Mizuki Fujiwara
4	MF	JPN	Kanae Yoshihara
5	DF	JPN	Rena Oga
6	MF	JPN	Itsuki Oka
7	MF	JPN	Sakura Ito
8	MF	JPN	Moe Tanaka
9	FW	JPN	Junko Fukumoto
10	MF	JPN	Tanaka Yoko *
11	MF	KOR	Lee Jungeun *
13	MF	JPN	Hitomi Nishiyama
14	MF	JPN	Sakura Ishihara
15	MF	JPN	Tsugumi Ebisutani
16	FW	JPN	Nishita Mai
17	MF	JPN	Kobayashi Ayana
18	FW	JPN	Rinka Asada
19	DF	JPN	Miyazaki Juri

No.	Pos.	Nation	Player
20	MF	JPN	Karin Tsunaga
21	MF	JPN	Aiko Namiki
22	DF	JPN	Honoka Murao
23	GK	JPN	Hana Abe
24	FW	JPN	Ai Hasegawa
25	DF	JPN	Mei Yamamoto
28	DF	JPN	Airi Yonekawa
29	FW	JPN	Yuki Arai
30	MF	JPN	Ichikawa Mei
32	DF	JPN	Kubota Chisa
33	FW	JPN	Nakamaru Mirei
37	GK	JPN	Haruna Daiguji
38	MF	JPN	Nana Yamada
44	FW	JPN	Hanari Nakamaru
55	MF	JPN	Manami Ogawa

- for professional players

== Results ==
Season	Domestic League				National Cup	Nadeshiko League Promotion Series
Season	League	Level	Place	Tms.	National Cup	Nadeshiko League Promotion Series
2022	Chugoku Women's Football League	4	4	9	Prefecture Qualifier Final	Group Stage
2023	Chugoku Women's Football League	4	3	10	Regional Qualifier Final	Group Stage
2024	Chugoku Women's Football League	4	2	10	Regional Qualifier Semi-final	3rd Place
