= 2010 FIFA U-17 Women's World Cup =

FIFA U-17 Women's World Cup Trinidad & Tobago 2010
- Trinidad & Tobago 2010 official logo

Tournament details
- Host country: Trinidad and Tobago
- Dates: 5–25 September
- Teams: 16 (from 6 confederations)
- Venues: 5 (in 5 host cities)

Final positions
- Champions: South Korea (1st title)
- Runners-up: Japan
- Third place: Spain
- Fourth place: North Korea

Tournament statistics
- Matches played: 32
- Goals scored: 125 (3.91 per match)
- Attendance: 141,622 (4,426 per match)
- Top scorer: (South Korea) Yeo Min-ji (8 goals)
- Best player: (South Korea) Yeo Min-ji
- Best goalkeeper: (Spain) Dolores Gallardo
- Fair play award: Germany

The 2010 FIFA U-17 Women's World Cup women's football tournament was the second such tournament, and was held in Trinidad and Tobago from 5 to 25 September 2010. Sixteen teams, comprising representatives from all six confederations, took part in the final competition, in which Trinidad and Tobago had a guaranteed place as the host nation.

== Qualified teams ==
- The qualifiers took place during late 2009 and early 2010. The places were allocated as follows to confederations: AFC (3), CAF (3), CONCACAF (2), CONMEBOL (3), OFC (1), UEFA (3), plus the host country.

Confederation	Qualifying Tournament	Qualifier(s)
AFC (Asia)	2009 AFC U-16 Women's Championship	North Korea; South Korea; Japan
CAF (Africa)	2010 African U-17 Women's World Cup Qualifying Tournament	Nigeria; Ghana; South Africa^{1}
CONCACAF (Central, North America and Caribbean)	Host nation	Trinidad and Tobago^{1}
CONCACAF (Central, North America and Caribbean)	2010 CONCACAF Under-17 Women's Championship	Canada (Mexico) Mexico^{1}
CONMEBOL (South America)	2010 South American Under 17 Women Championship	Brazil; Chile^{1} Venezuela^{1}
OFC (Oceania)	2010 OFC Women's Under 17 Qualifying Tournament	New Zealand
UEFA (Europe)	2010 UEFA Women's Under-17 Championship	Spain^{1} Republic of Ireland^{1} Germany

1.Teams that made their debut.

On 30 June 2010, President of Nigeria Goodluck Jonathan announced he would suspend the Nigeria Football Federation from FIFA competition for 2 years. This put the Flamingoes place at the competition in jeopardy. On 5 July 2010, the ban was lifted.

== Venues ==
During preparation, four stadiums were constructed in 2001. These four venues along with Hasely Crawford Stadium in Port of Spain, Trinidad are the venues for the women's competition.

Port of Spain	Arima/Malabar	Couva	Marabella	Scarborough
Hasely Crawford Stadium	Larry Gomes Stadium	Ato Boldon Stadium	Manny Ramjohn Stadium	Dwight Yorke Stadium
10°39′41.48″N 61°31′58.92″W	10°36′59.00″N 61°16′57.00″W	10°25′29.00″N 61°25′02.00″W	10°18′12.00″N 61°26′30.00″W	11°10′53.17″N 60°43′00.86″W
Capacity: 27,000	Capacity: 10,000	Capacity: 10,000	Capacity: 10,000	Capacity: 7,500
2010 FIFA U-17 Women's World Cup is located in Trinidad and Tobago

== Group stage ==
The opening phase of the tournament comprised four groups of four teams, with the top two sides in each section advancing to the quarter-finals. The final draw to determine the groups took place in Port of Spain, Trinidad and Tobago on 5 May 2010.

Tie breakers in the group stage are:

1. greatest number of points obtained in all group matches
2. goal difference in all group matches
3. greatest number of goals scored in all group matches

If more than two or more teams are still tied after that:

1. greatest number of points obtained in matches between concerned teams
2. goal difference in matches between concerned teams
3. greatest number of goals scored in matches between concerned teams
4. fair play point system, in which the yellow and red cards of group matches are evaluated
5. drawing of lots

=== Group A ===
Team	Pld	W	D	L	GF	GA	GD	Pts
Nigeria	3	3	0	0	10	3	+7	9
North Korea	3	2	0	1	6	3	+3	6
Trinidad and Tobago	3	1	0	2	3	4	−1	3
Chile	3	0	0	3	1	10	−9	0

Match times are local time (UTC−4).

5 September 2010
15:00

Nigeria	3–2	North Korea
Okobi 3', 79'; Ordega 77'	Report	Kim Su-gyong 28'; Kim Kum-jong 58'

Hasely Crawford Stadium, Port of Spain
Attendance: 13,646
Referee: Kirsi Heikkinen (Finland)

5 September 2010
18:00

Trinidad and Tobago	2–1	Chile
Simmons 9'; Hinds 80'	Report	Rothfeld 83'

Hasely Crawford Stadium, Port of Spain
Attendance: 13,646
Referee: Gyöngyi Gaál (Hungary)

8 September 2010
16:00

North Korea	3–0	Chile
Kim Kum-jong 44', 73'; Pong Son-hwa 85' (pen.)	Report

Manny Ramjohn Stadium, Marabella
Attendance: 10,000
Referee: Finau Vulivuli (Fiji)

8 September 2010
19:00

Trinidad and Tobago	1–2	Nigeria
Hinds 36'	Report	Ordega 28'; Ayila 86'

Manny Ramjohn Stadium, Marabella
Attendance: 10,000
Referee: Tanja Schett (Austria)

12 September 2010
18:00

North Korea	1–0	Trinidad and Tobago
Kim Su-gyong 3'	Report

Ato Boldon Stadium, Couva
Attendance: 8,000
Referee: Thalia Mitsi (Greece)

12 September 2010
18:00

Chile	0–5	Nigeria
	Report	Ordega 15'; Ayila 41', 51', 72'; Okobi 90+1'

Larry Gomes Stadium, Arima
Attendance: 2,335
Referee: Michelle Pye (Canada)

=== Group B ===
Team	Pld	W	D	L	GF	GA	GD	Pts
Germany	3	3	0	0	22	1	+21	9
South Korea	3	2	0	1	7	5	+2	6
Mexico	3	1	0	2	5	13	−8	3
South Africa	3	0	0	3	2	17	−15	0

Match times are local time (UTC−4).

5 September 2010
16:00

Germany	9–0	Mexico
Lotzen 4', 35'; Petermann 12', 13', 72'; Malinowski 42', 55', 66'; Demann 47'	Report

Dwight Yorke Stadium, Scarborough
Attendance: 2,961
Referee: Sachiko Yamagishi (Japan)

5 September 2010
19:00

South Africa	1–3	South Korea
Seoposenwe 53'	Report	Yeo Min-ji 37', 56'; Shin Dam-yeong 77'

Dwight Yorke Stadium, Scarborough
Attendance: 2,961
Referee: Tanja Schett (Austria)

8 September 2010
16:00

Germany	10–1	South Africa
Lotzen 12'; Malinowski 19', 29', 36', 57'; Leupolz 24', 25'; Petermann 35', 37'; Seoposenwe 45' (o.g.)	Report	Seoposenwe 31'

Dwight Yorke Stadium, Scarborough
Attendance: 1,830
Referee: Michelle Pye (Canada)

8 September 2010
19:00

South Korea	4–1	Mexico
Kim Na-ri 27'; Yeo Min-ji 40'; Kim Da-hye 76'; Lee Yoo-na 90'	Report	Piña 37'

Dwight Yorke Stadium, Scarborough
Attendance: 1,830
Referee: Estela Alvarez (Argentina)

12 September 2010
15:00

South Korea	0–3	Germany
	Report	Schmid 72'; Lotzen 76'; Chojnowski 90+3'

Larry Gomes Stadium, Arima
Attendance: 2,335
Referee: Shane de Silva (Trinidad and Tobago)

12 September 2010
15:00

Mexico	4–0	South Africa
Solís 21'; Sánchez 51'; Murillo 68'; Piña 77'	Report

Ato Boldon Stadium, Couva
Attendance: 8,500
Referee: Esther Staubli (Switzerland)

=== Group C ===
Team	Pld	W	D	L	GF	GA	GD	Pts
Spain	3	3	0	0	9	3	+6	9
Japan	3	2	0	1	13	4	+9	6
Venezuela	3	1	0	2	3	9	−6	3
New Zealand	3	0	0	3	2	11	−9	0

Match times are local time (UTC−4).

6 September 2010
16:00

Spain	4–1	Japan
I. Pérez 26'; Putellas 28'; Gutiérrez 41'; Pinel 55'	Report	Yokoyama 56'

Ato Boldon Stadium, Couva
Attendance: 1,364
Referee: Quetzalli Alvarado (Mexico)

6 September 2010
19:00

New Zealand	1–2	Venezuela
Loye 10'	Report	Viso 24', 67'

Ato Boldon Stadium, Couva
Attendance: 1,364
Referee: Thalia Mitsi (Greece)

9 September 2010
16:00

New Zealand	1–3	Spain
Loye 15'	Report	Gili 4'; Mérida 48'; Lázaro 86'

Ato Boldon Stadium, Couva
Attendance: 1,785
Referee: Cha Sung Mi (South Korea)

9 September 2010
19:00

Japan	6–0	Venezuela
Kyokawa 10', 32' (pen.), 59'; Y. Tanaka 27'; Yokoyama 70'; Nagashima 90+2'	Report

Ato Boldon Stadium, Couva
Attendance: 1,758
Referee: Quetzalli Alvarado (Mexico)

13 September 2010
16:00

Japan	6–0	New Zealand
Yokoyama 24', 58'; Y. Tanaka 59', 89'; M. Tanaka 74'; Honda 90+1'	Report

Dwight Yorke Stadium, Scarborough
Attendance: 2,140
Referee: Kirsi Heikkinen (Finland)

13 September 2010
16:00

Venezuela	1–2	Spain
Alvarado 74'	Report	Lázaro 28', 83'

Manny Ramjohn Stadium, Marabella
Attendance: 2,579
Referee: Therese Sagno (Guinea)

=== Group D ===
Team	Pld	W	D	L	GF	GA	GD	Pts
Republic of Ireland	3	2	0	1	5	2	+3	6
Brazil	3	2	0	1	4	2	+2	6
Canada	3	1	0	2	1	3	−2	3
Ghana	3	1	0	2	1	4	−3	3

Match times are local time (UTC−4).

6 September 2010
16:00

Republic of Ireland	1–2	Brazil
Killeen 58'	Report	Glaucia 4', 61'

Larry Gomes Stadium, Arima
Attendance: 1,881
Referee: Wang Jia (China)

6 September 2010
19:00

Canada	1–0	Ghana
Cantave 54'	Report

Larry Gomes Stadium, Arima
Attendance: 1,881
Referee: Sung Mi Cha (South Korea)

9 September 2010
16:00

Republic of Ireland	1–0	Canada
Killeen 76'	Report

Larry Gomes Stadium, Arima
Attendance: 2,293
Referee: Sachiko Yamagishi (Japan)

9 September 2010
19:00

Ghana	1–0	Brazil
Danso 22'	Report

Larry Gomes Stadium, Arima
Attendance: 2,293
Referee: Esther Staubli (Switzerland)

13 September 2010
19:00

Ghana	0–3	Republic of Ireland
	Report	Campbell 5'; Donnelly 36'; Gilroy 77'

Dwight Yorke Stadium, Scarborough
Attendance: 2,140
Referee: Estela Alvarez (Argentina)

13 September 2010
19:00

Brazil	2–0	Canada
Paula 20'; Thaís 51'	Report

Manny Ramjohn Stadium, Marabella
Attendance: 2,579
Referee: Gyöngyi Gaál (Hungary)

== Knockout stage ==
Quarter-finals
16 September — Marabella
Nigeria	5
South Korea	6
17 September — Couva
Spain	2
Brazil	1
16 September — Marabella
Germany	0
North Korea	1
17 September — Arima
Republic of Ireland	1
Japan	2

Semi-finals
21 September — Arima
South Korea	2
Spain	1
21 September — Couva
North Korea	1
Japan	2

Final
25 September — Port of Spain
South Korea	3 (5)
Japan	3 (4)
Third place
25 September — Port of Spain
Spain	1
North Korea	0

=== Quarterfinals ===
16 September 2010
16:00

Nigeria	5–6 (a.e.t.)	South Korea
Ayila 2', 103'; Eyebhoria 3'; Okobi 37', 90+1'	Report	Lee Geum-min 15'; Yeo Min-ji 23', 70' (pen.), 89', 98'; Kim A-reum 94'

Manny Ramjohn Stadium, Marabella
Attendance: 4,034
Referee: Thalia Mitsi (Greece)

16 September 2010
19:00

Germany	0–1	North Korea
	Report	Kim Kum-jong 44'

Manny Ramjohn Stadium, Marabella
Attendance: 4,034
Referee: Quetzalli Alvarado (Mexico)

17 September 2010
16:00

Spain	2–1	Brazil
Pinel 35'; Calderón 65'	Report	Andrés 76' (o.g.)

Ato Boldon Stadium, Couva
Attendance: 1,265
Referee: Sachiko Yamagishi (Japan)

17 September 2010
19:00

Republic of Ireland	1–2	Japan
O'Sullivan 53'	Report	Naomoto 34' (pen.); Yokoyama 66'

Larry Gomes Stadium, Arima
Attendance: 1,427
Referee: Michelle Pye (Canada)

=== Semifinals ===
21 September 2010
16:00

South Korea	2–1	Spain
Yeo Min-ji 25'; Joo Soo-jin 39'	Report	Sampedro 23'

Ato Boldon Stadium, Couva
Attendance: 3,428
Referee: Michelle Pye (Canada)

21 September 2010
19:00

North Korea	1–2	Japan
Kim Kum-jong 59'	Report	Takagi 69'; Yokoyama 70'

Ato Boldon Stadium, Couva
Attendance: 3,428
Referee: Gyöngyi Gaál (Hungary)

=== Third place playoff ===
25 September 2010
15:00

Spain	1–0	North Korea
Pinel 56'	Report

Hasely Crawford Stadium, Port of Spain
Attendance: 12,983
Referee: Quetzalli Alvarado (Mexico)

=== Final ===
25 September 2010
18:00

South Korea	3–3 (a.e.t.)	Japan
Lee Jung-eun 6'; Kim A-reum 45+1'; Lee So-dam 79'	Report	Naomoto 11'; Y. Tanaka 17'; Katō 57'
Penalties
Lee Jung-eun (penalty missed); Yeo Min-ji (penalty scored); Lee So-dam (penalty scored); Kim Da-hye (penalty scored); Kim A-reum (penalty scored); Jang Sel-gi (penalty scored)	5–4	(penalty scored) Y. Tanaka; (penalty missed) Wada; (penalty scored) Nakada; (penalty scored) Hamada; (penalty scored) Naomoto; (penalty missed) Muramatsu

Hasely Crawford Stadium, Port of Spain
Attendance: 12,983
Referee: Kirsi Heikkinen (Finland)

== Winners ==
2010 FIFA U-17 Women's World Cup winners

South Korea
First title

== Awards ==
Golden Ball	Silver Ball	Bronze Ball
(South Korea) Yeo Min-ji	(Japan) Kumi Yokoyama	(North Korea) Kim Kum-jong

Golden Shoe	Silver Shoe	Bronze Shoe
(South Korea) Yeo Min-ji	(Germany) Kyra Malinowski	(Japan) Kumi Yokoyama

FIFA Fair Play Award	Golden Glove
Germany	(Spain) Dolores Gallardo

== Goal scorers ==
8 goals

- (South Korea) Yeo Min-ji

7 goals

- (Germany) Kyra Malinowski

6 goals

- (Japan) Kumi Yokoyama
- (Nigeria) Loveth Ayila

5 goals

- (Germany) Lena Petermann
- (Nigeria) Ngozi Okobi
- (North Korea) Kim Kum-jong

4 goals

- (Germany) Lena Lotzen
- (Japan) Yōko Tanaka

3 goals

- (Nigeria) Francisca Ordega
- (Japan) Mai Kyokawa
- (Spain) Paloma Lázaro
- (Spain) Raquel Pinel

2 goals

- (Brazil) Glaucia
- (Germany) Melanie Leupolz
- (Republic of Ireland) Siobhán Killeen
- (Japan) Hikaru Naomoto
- (South Korea) Kim A-reum
- (Mexico) Fernanda Piña
- (New Zealand) Kate Loye
- (North Korea) Kim Su-Gyong
- (South Africa) Jermaine Seoposenwe
- (Trinidad and Tobago) Liana Hinds
- (Venezuela) Ysaura Viso

1 goal

- (Brazil) Paula
- (Brazil) Thaís
- (Canada) Haisha Cantave
- (Chile) Iona Rothfeld
- (Spain) Nagore Calderón
- (Spain) Laura Gutiérrez
- (Spain) Gema Gili
- (Spain) Sara Merida
- (Spain) Iraia Pérez
- (Spain) Alexia Putellas
- (Spain) Amanda Sampedro
- (Germany) Silvana Chojnowski
- (Germany) Kristin Demann
- (Germany) Isabella Schmid
- (Ghana) Alice Danso
- (Republic of Ireland) Megan Campbell
- (Republic of Ireland) Stacie Donnelly
- (Republic of Ireland) Aileen Gilroy
- (Republic of Ireland) Denise O'Sullivan
- (Japan) Yuka Honda
- (Japan) Chika Katō
- (Japan) Hikari Nagashima
- (Japan) Mina Tanaka
- (Japan) Hikari Takagi
- (South Korea) Kim Da-hye
- (South Korea) Lee So-dam
- (South Korea) Shin Dam-yeong
- (South Korea) Lee Jung-eun
- (South Korea) Lee Yoo-na
- (South Korea) Kim Na-ri
- (South Korea) Lee Geum-min
- (South Korea) Joo Soo-jin
- (Mexico) Christina Murillo
- (Mexico) Andrea Sánchez
- (Mexico) Daniela Solís
- (Nigeria) Winifred Eyebhoria
- (North Korea) Pong Son-Hwa
- (Trinidad and Tobago) Diarra Simmons
- (Venezuela) Anna Alvarado

Own goal

- (South Africa) Jermaine Seoposenwe (against Germany)
- (Spain) Ivana Andres (against Brazil)
