= Melissa Espina =

Chilean footballer (born 1994)

Personal information
- Full name: Melissa Andrea Espina Esquivel
- Date of birth: 6 July 1994 (age 32)
- Place of birth: Santiago, Chile
- Height: 1.54 m (5 ft 1 in)
- Position: Midfielder

Team information
- Current team: Deportes Iquique

College career
Years	Team	Apps	(Gls)
2015–2020	Aztecas UDLAP		

Senior career*
Years	Team	Apps	(Gls)
2007	Unión San Felipe		
–2010	Audax Italiano		
2011–2012	Colo-Colo		
2013–2014	Universidad de Chile		
2020–2022	Palestino		
2023	Atlético San Luis		
2024	Audax Italiano		
2025–	Deportes Iquique		

International career
2009–2010	Chile U17		
2012	Chile U20		
- * Club domestic league appearances and goals

Melissa Andrea Espina Esquivel (born 6 July 1994) is a Chilean footballer who plays as a midfielder for Deportes Iquique.

== Club career ==
Born in Santiago de Chile, Espina began playing football alongside male players.

At club level, she made her debut with Unión San Felipe at the age of thirteen.

Later, she played for Audax Italiano, Colo-Colo and Universidad de Chile.

In 2015, she emigrated to Mexico and spent six years playing at university level for Aztecas UDLAP until 2020.

Back in Chile, she joined Palestino. In February 2022, she signed her first professional contract with them. In the first half of the same year, she suffered a collarbone fracture, returning to play in the second half.

In 2023, she joined the Mexican club Atlético San Luis, becoming the first Chilean player in the Liga MX Femenil. She made his debut on 16 January in the 3–1 win against León and left the club in the second half of the year.

In 2024, Espina returned to her homeland and rejoined Audax Italiano. The next year, she switched to Deportes Iquique.

== International career ==
In 2009, Espina represented Chile U17 in friendly matches previous to the 2010 South American Championship, but she was hit by a car while riding a bicycle, suffering a fracture in two lumbar vertebrae and not taking part in the final squad. However, she took part in the FIFA World Cup.

In 2012, she represented the under-20's.

At senior level, she has taken part in training microcycles in 2021.

== Personal life ==
Espina attended the Universidad de las Américas Puebla and got a degree in business managing. She has worked as a business analyst in a Chilean medical technology company.
