= Michelle Pye =

Canadian soccer referee

- Full name: Michelle Pye
- Born: 1978 (age 47–48); Kamloops, British Columbia, Canada

Domestic
Years	League	Role

International
Years	League	Role
2007–2017	FIFA-listed	Referee

Michelle Pye (born 1978) is a Canadian soccer referee. She was given her international badge by FIFA in 2007. Pye is one of only seven international soccer referees in Canada. She began her career as an official in Kamloops, British Columbia in the mid-1990s. Since age 13 she has worked her way up to the highest level possible for a soccer match official.

Pye was inducted to the Canada Soccer Hall of Fame in 2025.

== Career ==
In 2012, along with Carol Anne Chénard, David Gantar, Silviu Petrescu, and Paul Ward, Pye was named again to the 2012 FIFA list of referees.

Pye was previously appointed to the tournament at New Zealand 2008 and Trinidad and Tobago 2010.

On 27–29 July, Ottawa, Ontario, Canada was the stage of the 2012 W-League Championship, the crowning event of the highest level of women's soccer in the United States and Canada. Three national list officials participated in the event: Michelle Pye, Suzanne Morisset and Sheena Dickson. Pye and Morisset attended this year's CONCACAF Women's U-17 Championship in Guatemala. The 2012 CONCACAF Women's Under-17 Championship took place 2–13 May in Ciudad Guatemala, Guatemala.

== Competitions officiated ==
- 2006 W-League as a referee for Charlotte Lady Eagles versus Ottawa Fury Women on August 4, 2006.
- 2008 FIFA U-17 Women's World Cup as a referee for Germany versus North Korea on November 4, 2008, Brazil versus England on October 30 and North Korea versus England (Semifinals) on November 13. Pye was the 4th official for Paraguay versus USA on November 2. Japan versus France. She also attended the game between England versus Germany.
- Football at the 2009 Summer Universiade – Women as a referee for South Korea versus Germany on June 30, 2009, Republic of Ireland versus France on July 4 and Germany versus Serbia (Classification round) on July 8.
- 2010 Algarve Cup as a referee for Germany versus Denmark on February 24, 2010, and China versus Sweden (3rd place game) on March 3.
- 2010 CONCACAF Women's U-17 Championship as a referee for Costa Rica versus Cayman Islands on March 10, 2010.
- 2010 W-League (North America) as a referee for Pali Blues versus Vancouver Whitecaps Women on July 24, 2010.
- Football at the 2010 Summer Youth Olympics – Girls' tournament as a referee for Turkey versus Iran on August 12, 2010, Turkey versus Iran on August 24. Pye was the 4th official for Papua New Guinea versus Turkey. Turkey versus Chile:
- 2010 FIFA U-17 Women's World Cup On September 12, 2010, Py was a referee for a soccer match of Chile versus Nigeria at Larry Gomes Stadium, Arima held in Trinidad and Tobago from September 5–25, 2010. Also, on September 8, she attended the game between Germany versus South Africa. On September 17, she refereed a match between Republic of Ireland and Japan in the quarterfinals. Then, on September 21, a game between South Korea and. Spain in the semifinals. She was 4th official in the between Germany and Mexico. And 4th official in South Africa versus Korea Republic: and 4th official in Spain versus North Korea DPR:
- 2012 CONCACAF Women's U-17 Championship as a referee for US versus Mexico on May 7, 2012, in Guatemala City, Guatemala at Estadio Cementos Progreso.
- 2012 W-League season as a Referee for Pali Blues versus Ottawa Fury Women on July 29, 2012, the championship game. She was one of the officials for the match of Quebec Dynamo ARSQ versus Pali Blues.
- 2015 FIFA Women's World Cup as the fourth official for France versus England on June 9, 2015, Germany versus Côte d'Ivoire on June 7, 2015, France versus Colombia on June 13, 2015, and England versus Colombia on June 17, 2015.
