= Kaitlyn Parcell =

American soccer player

Personal information
- Date of birth: September 9, 1997 (age 29)
- Place of birth: Spring Lake, New Jersey, United States
- Height: 1.65 m (5 ft 5 in)
- Position: Wing-back

Team information
- Current team: Fortuna Hjørring
- Number: 22

Youth career
- 2010–2012: Westside Breakers
- 2012–2015: South Bay Force
- 2015–2016: Real SoCal

College career
Years	Team	Apps	(Gls)
2016–2019	Santa Clara		
2020–2021	Georgetown		

Senior career*
Years	Team	Apps	(Gls)
2021–2023	MSV Duisburg	43	(2)
2024–	Fortuna Hjørring	24	(1)
- * Club domestic league appearances and goals as of 13 August 2025

Kaitlyn Parcell (born September 9, 1997) is an American soccer player who currently plays for Danish A-Liga club Fortuna Hjørring.

Parcell was born in Spring Lake, New Jersey and played youth football with Westside Breakers, South Bay Force, and Real SoCal. She played college football with Santa Clara and NCAA Division 1 soccer for Georgetown University, before starting her professional career in 2021 with Women's Bundesliga club MSV Duisburg.

Parcell made the move to the Danish A-Liga club Fortuna Hjørring in January 2024.
