= Dörthe Hoppius =

German footballer

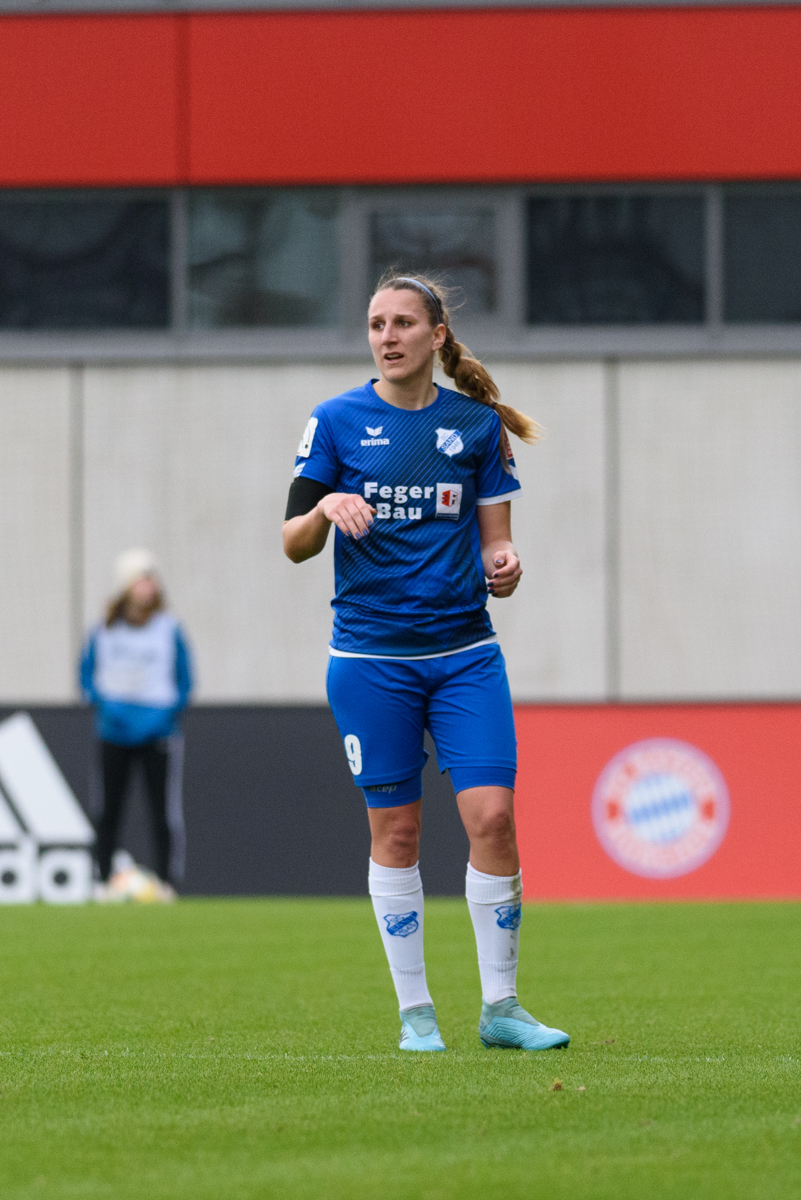
- Hoppius with SC Sand in 2020

Personal information
- Date of birth: 22 May 1996 (age 30)
- Place of birth: Recklinghausen, Germany
- Height: 1.78 m (5 ft 10 in)
- Position: Forward

Team information
- Current team: VfL Bochum
- Number: 14

Youth career
- BVH Dorsten
- –2010: FC Rhade
- 2010–2012: VfL Bochum

College career
Years	Team	Apps	(Gls)
2014–2017	San Jose State Spartans	80	(23)

Senior career*
Years	Team	Apps	(Gls)
2012–2014	VfL Bochum	43	(25)
2018–2019	MSV Duisburg	22	(8)
2019–2022	SC Sand	61	(9)
2022–2023	MSV Duisburg	20	(2)
2023–	VfL Bochum	24	(31)

International career^{‡}
2012	Germany U16	6	(3)
2012	Germany U17	3	(0)
2016	Germany U20	2	(0)
Medal record
VfL Bochum
Winner	Regionalliga West	2012–13
Winner	Westphalian Cup	2012–13
Winner	Regionalliga West	2023–24
- * Club domestic league appearances and goals as of 22:20, 22 August 2022 (UCT) ‡ National team caps and goals as of 26 November 2016

Dörthe Hoppius (born 22 May 1996) is a German footballer who plays as a forward for VfL Bochum in the 2. Frauen-Bundesliga.

== Club career ==
A native of Dorsten, Hoppius began playing youth football with local sides BVH Dorsten and FC Rhade, before joining VfL Bochum. By age 18, Hoppius had already scored nine goals for VfL Bochum in the 2. Frauen-Bundesliga. Next, she played collegiate soccer for the San Jose State Spartans in the United States, and was awarded the team's top offensive player two consecutive seasons.

When she returned to Germany, Hoppius signed for Frauen-Bundesliga side MSV Duisburg, where she led the team in scoring with eight league goals during the 2018–19 season. She signed for rivals SC Sand following the season. She is also training to be a police officer.

Following another season with MSV Duisburg, she rejoined her former club VfL Bochum in 2023, where she contributed to their promotion to the 2. Bundesliga.

== Career statistics ==
As of 17 August 2019

Appearances and goals by club, season and competition
Club	Season	League			Cup		Total	
Club	Season	Division	Apps	Goals	Apps	Goals	Apps	Goals
VfL Bochum	2012–13	Regionalliga West	21	16	—		21	16
VfL Bochum	2013–14	2. Bundesliga	22	9	3	3	25	12
VfL Bochum	Total		43	25	3	3	46	28
MSV Duisburg	2018–19	Bundesliga	22	8	2	1	24	9
SC Sand	2019–20	Bundesliga	0	0	0	0	0	0
Career total			65	33	5	4	70	37
