= Yoko Tanaka =

Japanese footballer

Yoko Tanaka 田中 陽子
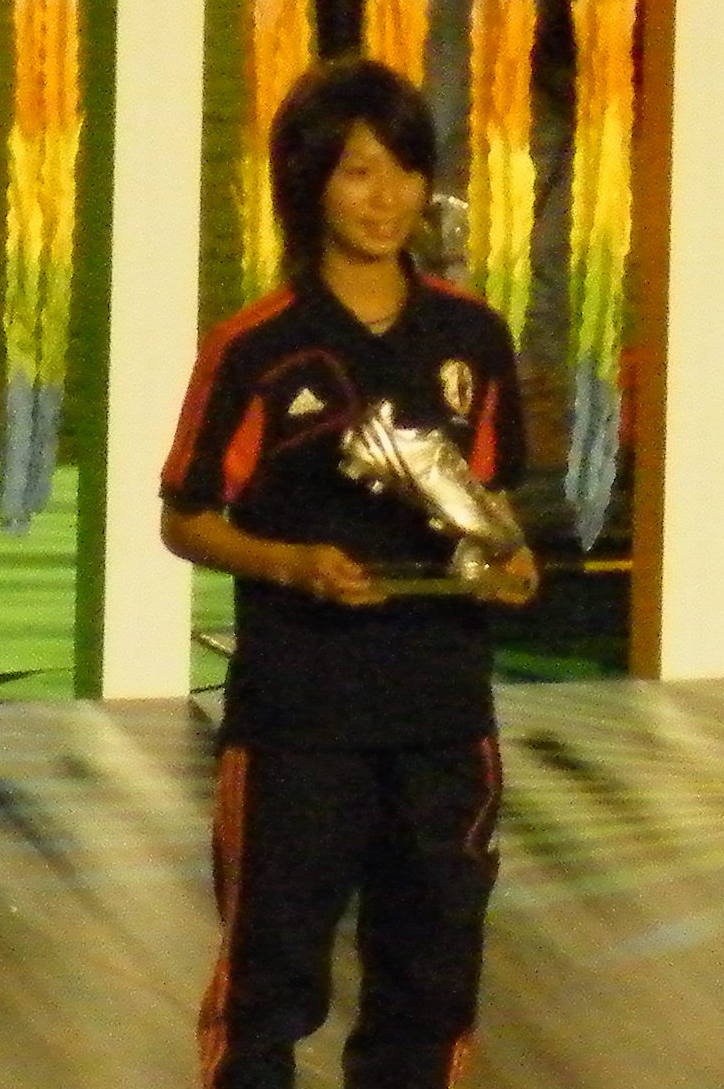
- 2012 U-20 World Cup Awards Ceremony

Personal information
- Full name: Yoko Tanaka
- Date of birth: 30 July 1993 (age 33)
- Place of birth: Yamaguchi, Yamaguchi, Japan
- Height: 1.57 m (5 ft 2 in)
- Position: Midfielder

Team information
- Current team: Renofa Yamaguchi FC Ladies
- Number: 10

Youth career
- 2006–2011: JFA Academy Fukushima

Senior career*
Years	Team	Apps	(Gls)
2012–2014	INAC Kobe Leonessa	34	(8)
2015–2019	Nojima Stella Kanagawa Sagamihara	88	(35)
2019–2021	Sporting de Huelva	42	(5)
2021–2022	Rayo Vallecano	15	(0)
2022–2024	Incheon Hyundai Steel Red Angels WFC	46	(4)
2025–	Renofa Yamaguchi FC Ladies		
Total		225	(52)

International career^{‡}
2008–2010	Japan U-17	9	(4)
2012	Japan U-20	6	(6)
2013	Japan	4	(0)
Medal record
INAC Kobe Leonessa
Winner	Nadeshiko League	2012
Winner	Nadeshiko League	2013
Winner	Nadeshiko League Cup	2013
Runner-up	Nadeshiko League Cup	2012
Winner	Empress's Cup	2012
Winner	Empress's Cup	2013
Nojima Stella Kanagawa Sagamihara
Runner-up	Empress's Cup	2017
Representing Japan
FIFA U-20 Women's World Cup
Bronze medal – third place	2012 Japan
AFC U-19 Women's Championship
Gold medal – first place	2011 Vietnam
FIFA U-17 Women's World Cup
Silver medal – second place	2010 Trinidad and Tobago
AFC U-16 Women's Championship
Bronze medal – third place	2009 Thailand
- * Club domestic league appearances and goals as of 1 January 2025 ‡ National team caps and goals as of 1 January 2025

Yoko Tanaka (田中 陽子, Tanaka Yōko; born 30 July 1993) is a Japanese professional footballer who plays as a midfielder for Renofa Yamaguchi FC Ladies. She has also been a member of the Japan national team.

== Club career ==
Tanaka was born in Yamaguchi on July 30, 1993. After graduating from JFA Academy Fukushima, she joined INAC Kobe Leonessa in 2012. In 2014, she moved to Nojima Stella Kanagawa Sagamihara. In July 2019, she moved to Sporting de Huelva. In December 2024, she returned to Japan to sign for her hometown team-Renofa Yamaguchi FC Ladies, becoming the first player to sign a professional contract for the club.

== National team career ==
Tanaka was a member of Japan U-17 national team for 2008 and 2010 U-17 World Cup. At 2010, she played 6 games and 4 goals, and U-17 Japan team won 2nd place. She was also a member of U-20 team for 2012 U-20 World Cup in Japan. She played 6 games and 6 goals. She was selected Silver Shoe awards and Japan won 3rd place. In March 2013, she was selected Japan national team for 2013 Algarve Cup. At this competition, on March 6, she debuted against Norway. She played 4 games for Japan in 2013.

== National team statistics ==
Japan national team
Year	Apps	Goals
2013	4	0
Total	4	0
