= Mary Essiful =

Ghanaian footballer (born 1993)

Personal information
- Date of birth: 22 June 1993 (age 33)
- Position: Midfielder

Senior career*
Years	Team	Apps	(Gls)
- Soccer Intellectuals Ladies

International career^{‡}
- Ghana
- * Club domestic league appearances and goals ‡ National team caps and goals as of 11 October 2014 (before the 2014 African Women's Championship)

Mary Essiful (born 22 June 1993) is a Ghanaian footballer who plays as a midfielder for the Ghana women's national football team. She was part of the team at the 2014 African Women's Championship. On club level she played for Soccer Intellectuals Ladies in Ghana. In 2020, she signed for NWFL Premiership side, Rivers Angels F.C.
