= Loveth Ayila =

Nigerian footballer (born 1994)

Personal information
- Full name: Loveth Ngusurun Ayila
- Date of birth: 6 September 1994 (age 32)
- Place of birth: Nigeria
- Height: 1.59 m (5 ft 3 in)
- Position: Forward

Senior career*
Years	Team	Apps	(Gls)
2013–2014	Bobruichanka Bobruisk	23	(29)
2015	Rivers Angels		

International career^{‡}
2010	Nigeria U17		
2014	Nigeria U20		
2010–2015	Nigeria	3	(0)
- * Club domestic league appearances and goals as of 13:17, 2 July 2015 (UTC) ‡ National team caps and goals as of 18:33, 17 June 2015 (UTC)

Loveth Ngusurun Ayila (born 6 September 1994) is a Nigerian international footballer who plays as a forward.

== Club career ==
Ayila played for Bobruichanka Bobruisk in the Belarusian Premier League before moving to Rivers Angels.

== International career ==
Aylia represented the Nigeria U17 team in the 2010 FIFA U-17 Women's World Cup and the U20 team in the 2014 FIFA U-20 Women's World Cup. She subsequently won three caps for the full national team, and was called up to play in the 2015 FIFA Women's World Cup, although she did not make an appearance at the tournament.

She was also part of Nigeria's winning squad at the 2010 African Women's Championship.

== Honours ==
=== International ===
Nigeria

- African Women's Championship (1): 2010
