= MSV Duisburg (women) =

- Full name: Meidericher Sportverein 02 e. V. Duisburg
- Nickname: Die Zebras (The Zebras)
- Founded: 1 January 2014; 12 years ago
- Ground: PCC-Stadion
- Capacity: 3.000
- Manager: Henrik Lehm
- League: Bundesliga
- 2023–24: 12th of 12 (relegated)
Home colours	Away colours

Meidericher Spielverein 02 e. V. Duisburg, commonly known as MSV Duisburg, is a German women's football club based in Duisburg, North Rhine-Westphalia.

== History ==
The women's football section of MSV Duisburg was founded in 2014. It is the successor club of FCR 2001 Duisburg which went into insolvency the year before. When FCR 2001 Duisburg had to file for insolvency during the 2013–14 season, nearly all players left the club and joined the MSV Duisburg. As MSV they were allowed to continue the second half of the season with the original license of the FCR. MSV Duisburg played in the second level, 2. Bundesliga. In 2015–16, winning the league championship promoted the club to the 2016–17 Bundesliga. The club remained in the top level until 2020–21. In the 2021–22 season, they returned to the Bundesliga for the 2022–23 season. Following a last-place finish in the 2023–24 Bundesliga, they withdrew from the 2024–25 2. Bundesliga season. The decision was made to compete in the West Regionalliga, following the relegation of the men's team to the Regionalliga and the resulting financial deficits.

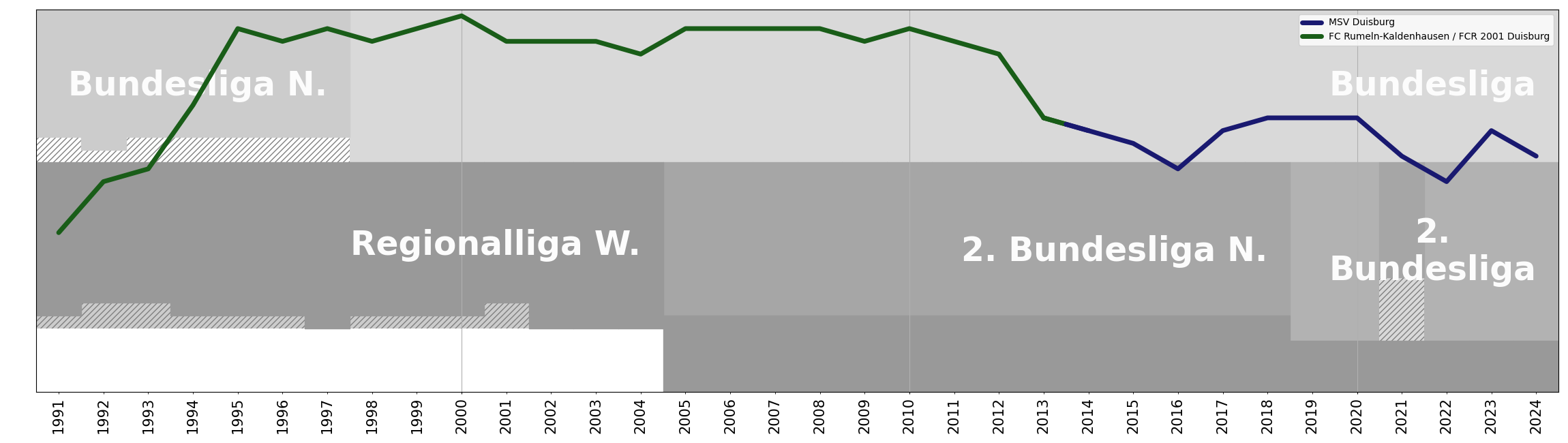
League positions at end of season for MSV Duisburg

== Current squad ==
As of 15 May 2022

Note: Flags indicate national team as defined under FIFA eligibility rules; some limited exceptions apply. Players may hold more than one non-FIFA nationality.

No.	Pos.	Nation	Player
1	GK	GER	Kathrin Närdemann
4	DF	GER	Kara Bathmann
5	DF	GER	Paula Flach
8	MF	GER	Vanessa Fürst
10	MF	GER	Meret Günster
11	FW	GER	Dörthe Hoppius
14	DF	DEN	Emilie Henriksen
16	DF	USA	Kelsey Vogel

No.	Pos.	Nation	Player
17	MF	GER	Yvonne Zielinski
18	MF	AUT	Jelena Prvulović
19	FW	GER	Antonia-Johanna Halverkamps
21	MF	GER	Sarah Freutel
25	DF	USA	Kaitlyn Parcell
27	MF	GER	Alissa Andres
30	MF	GER	Gina Ebels
—	FW	GER	Eva Hilsenberg

=== Former players ===
- (Bosnia and Herzegovina) Sejla Dedic
- (Canada) Sura Yekka
- (Morocco) Narijs Ahamad
- (Turkey) Miray Cin
- (Canada) Danica Wu
- (Tunisia) Hanna Hamdi
- (Czech Republic) Lucie Vonkova
- (Hungary) Zsofia Racz
- (New Zealand) Emma Rolston
- (Greece) Sofia Nati
