= Iona Rothfeld =

Chilean footballer (born 1993)

Personal information
- Full name: Iona Ronit Rothfeld Báscoli
- Date of birth: 19 January 1993 (age 33)
- Place of birth: Santiago, Chile
- Height: 5 ft 9 in (1.75 m)
- Position: Midfielder

Youth career
- 2004–2006: Santiago Oriente

College career
Years	Team	Apps	(Gls)
2018–2019	St. Thomas Bobcats		

Senior career*
Years	Team	Apps	(Gls)
2007–2012	Universidad Católica		
2014–2015	Audax Italiano		
2016	Universidad Católica		
2020–2021	Audax Italiano		

International career
2006	Chile U14		
2009–2010	Chile U17		
2013–2014	Chile	4	(0)
Medal record
Women's football
Representing Chile
South American Games
Silver medal – second place	2014 Santiago	Team
- * Club domestic league appearances and goals

Iona Ronit Rothfeld Báscoli (born 19 January 1993) is a Chilean former football player who played as a midfielder. She is currently the President of ANJUFF (Asociación Nacional de Jugadoras de Fútbol Femenino), the union of female footballers in Chile.

== Football career ==
=== Club career ===
Rothfeld began her career with the Santiago Oriente academy. At senior level, she played for Universidad Católica and Audax Italiano in her homeland.

While studying in the United States, she played for St. Thomas Bobcats.

=== International career ===
After taking part in a trial competition, Rothfeld represented Chile at under-14 level in the opening of a new headquarters of FIFA.

In 2010, Rothfeld represented Chile U17 in the South American Championship, qualifying to the FIFA World Cup, the first time for a Chilean women's team. She also represented them in the World Cup.

At senior level, she made an appearance in the 2013 International Tournament of Brasília and three appearances in the 2014 South American Games, winning the silver medal.

=== Leader career ===
In 2016, Chile dropped out of the FIFA rankings again, just a year after achieving their best ranking of 41 in 2015. Rothfeld, Christiane Endler, and a few other Chilean teammates created the ANJUFF (Asociación Nacional de Jugadoras de Fútbol Femenino), a Chilean women's footballing union to combat neglect from their federation. ANJUFF received recognition from Chile's athletic unions and FIFPro, and was one of the first efforts to unionize female athletes in Latin America. Chile made their competitive return in May 2017, winning by 12–0 over Peru.

Since then, she has led the institution.

== Other works ==
Rothfeld performed as co-director of OFFSIDE, a short documentary film about women in the 2019 FIFA Women's World Cup.

She frequently gives talks about women's leadership and gender equaty.

She serves as adviser for ComunidadMujer.

== Personal life ==
Rothfeld attended the University of Chile to study law. Abroad, she attended the St. Thomas University and got a political science degree. She also got a degree in sport management at the Santo Tomás University.

== Political views ==
Committed with the gender equity, Rothfeld was an independent candidate for the 2021 Chilean Constitutional Convention to write a new Constitution.

== Honours ==
Chile

- South American Games Silver medal: 2014
