= Sarah Romert =

German footballer (born 1994)

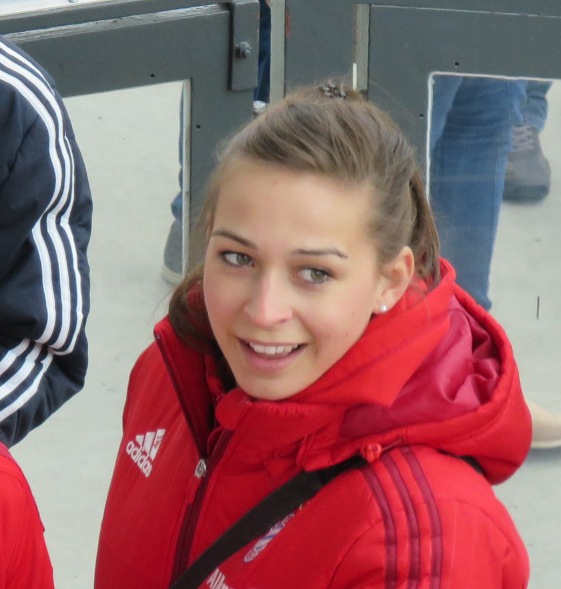

Personal information
- Date of birth: 13 December 1994 (age 31)
- Place of birth: Memmingen, Germany
- Height: 1.74 m (5 ft 9 in)
- Position: Midfielder

Team information
- Current team: Bayern Munich

Sarah Romert (born 13 December 1994) is a German former professional footballer who played as a midfielder for Bayern Munich.
