= Haruna Kawashima =

Japanese association football player

Personal information
- Date of birth: 12 April 1993 (age 33)
- Place of birth: Shizuoka Prefecture, Japan
- Height: 1.56 m (5 ft 1 in)
- Position: Midfielder

Team information
- Current team: Nojima Stella
- Number: 17

Senior career*
Years	Team	Apps	(Gls)
2021–2023	Sanfrecce Hiroshima Regina		
2023–	Nojima Stella		
- * Club domestic league appearances and goals

Haruna Kawashima (born 12 April 1993) is a Japanese professional footballer who plays as a midfielder for WE League club Nojima Stella Kanagawa Sagamihara.

== Club career ==
Kawashima made her WE League debut on 12 September 2021.
