= Arisa Mochizuki =

Japanese footballer (born 1994)

Personal information
- Date of birth: 15 April 1994 (age 32)
- Place of birth: Tokyo Prefecture, Japan
- Height: 1.72 m (5 ft 8 in)
- Position: Goalkeeper

Team information
- Current team: JEF United Chiba
- Number: 1

Senior career*
Years	Team	Apps	(Gls)
2021–2024	Omiya Ardija Ventus		
2024–	JEF United Chiba		
- * Club domestic league appearances and goals

Arisa Mochizuki (born 15 April 1994) is a Japanese professional footballer who plays as a goalkeeper for WE League club JEF United Chiba.

== Club career ==
Mochizuki made her WE League debut on 12 September 2021.
