= Sarah Freutel =

German footballer (born 1992)

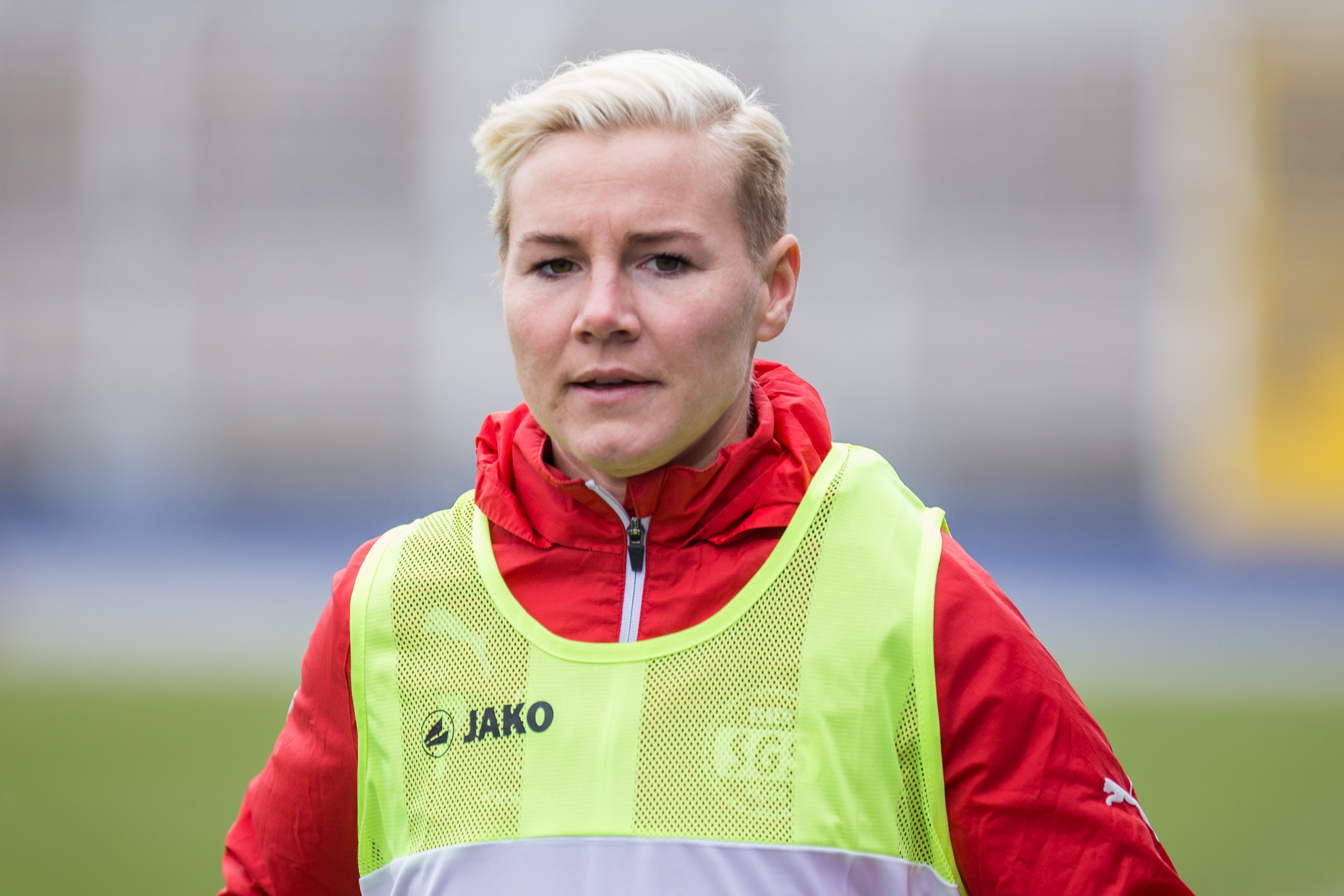

Personal information
- Full name: Sarah Freutel
- Date of birth: 11 July 1992 (age 34)
- Place of birth: Essen, Germany
- Height: 1.70 m (5 ft 7 in)
- Position: Midfielder

Team information
- Current team: MSV Duisburg

Youth career
- 2008-2009: SGS Essen

Senior career*
Years	Team	Apps	(Gls)
2009-2019	SGS Essen	154	(16)
2022-	MSV Duisburg	21	(3)
- * Club domestic league appearances and goals

Sarah Freutel (born 11 July 1992) is a German footballer who plays as a midfielder for MSV Duisburg
