= Leticia Torres (footballer) =

Chilean footballer (born 1994)

Personal information
- Full name: Leticia Francisca Torres Mandiola
- Date of birth: 30 May 1994 (age 32)
- Place of birth: Chile
- Height: 1.69 m (5 ft 7 in)
- Position: Defender

Youth career
- Santa Rosa
- Universidad Católica

College career
Years	Team	Apps	(Gls)
2012–2015	San Francisco Dons		

Senior career*
Years	Team	Apps	(Gls)
2008–2011	Universidad Católica		
2018	Boldklubben af 1893		

International career
2008–2010	Chile U17	10	(0)
2010–2014	Chile U20	14	(0)
2011–2014	Chile	11	(0)
Medal record
Women's football
Representing Chile
South American Games
Silver medal – second place	2014 Santiago	Team
- * Club domestic league appearances and goals

Leticia Francisca Torres Mandiola (born 30 May 1994) is a Chilean former footballer who played as a defender.

== Club career ==
As a youth player, Torres and her sister were with club Santa Rosa from Las Condes, Chile, before joining Universidad Católica in 2008. In 2012, she moved to the United States and played for San Francisco Dons.

She spent two years not playing football due to an ankle injury before joining Danish club Boldklubben af 1893 in 2018.

== International career ==
She was captain of the U17 team, who was the first team to qualify to a World Cup in 2010. She was captain on the U20 teams in 2012 and 2014 and was part of the full team that participated in the Copa America in 2014.

== Personal life ==
Her grandfather, Jaime Mandiola, was a top goalscorer at the Universidad Católica youth ranks.

== Honours ==
Chile

- South American Games Silver medal: 2014
