= Mieten, kaufen, wohnen =

German television series

mieten, kaufen, wohnen
- Genre: Scripted reality
- Country of origin: Germany
- Original language: German

Production
- Running time: 46 minutes
- Production company: Fanarseu Film TV

Original release
- Network: VOX
- Release: 2008 – 2016

mieten, kaufen, wohnen ("rent, buy, live") is a German reality series on the VOX channel which is similar to the American House Hunters show. It was produced from October 2008 to September 2016 and appears each weekday. The show is produced by Fanarseu Film TV.
