= Kyra Malinowski =

German footballer

Personal information
- Full name: Kyra Malinowski
- Date of birth: 20 January 1993 (age 33)
- Place of birth: Bochum, Germany
- Height: 1.75 m (5 ft 9 in)
- Position: Striker

Senior career*
Years	Team	Apps	(Gls)
2008–2009	SG Wattenscheid 09	13	(2)
2009–2013	SG Essen-Schönebeck	34	(8)

Managerial career
- 2022–: VfL Bochum
- * Club domestic league appearances and goals

Kyra Malinowski (born 20 January 1993) is a German former football striker. She last played for SG Essen-Schönebeck in Germany's Frauen Bundesliga.

She was named the MVP of the 2009 U-17 European Championship after scoring five goals in the final against Spain. The following year she scored two goals in the 2010 U-19 European Championship. She was subsequently awarded the bronze Fritz Walter Medal.

Following her retirement from playing football at SG Essen-Schönebeck, she became manager of their U17 and U20 divisions. She was later appointed as head coach of VfL Bochum on 25 July 2022.
