= Hikari Nagashima =

Japanese footballer

Personal information
- Date of birth: 2 December 1993 (age 32)
- Place of birth: Saitama Prefecture, Japan
- Height: 1.66 m (5 ft 5 in)
- Position: Defender

Team information
- Current team: Nojima Stella Kanagawa Sagamihara
- Number: 3

Senior career*
Years	Team	Apps	(Gls)
2021–2024	Omiya Ardija Ventus		
2024–	Nojima Stella Kanagawa Sagamihara		
- * Club domestic league appearances and goals

Hikari Nagashima (born 2 December 1993) is a Japanese professional footballer who plays as a defender for WE League club Nojima Stella Kanagawa Sagamihara.

== Club career ==
Nagashima made her WE League debut on 12 September 2021.
