= 2009 UEFA Women's Under-19 Championship =

Tournament details
- Host country: Belarus
- Dates: 13–25 July
- Teams: 8 (from 1 confederation)

Final positions
- Champions: England (1st title)
- Runners-up: Sweden

Tournament statistics
- Matches played: 15
- Goals scored: 50 (3.33 per match)
- Attendance: 41,544 (2,770 per match)
- Top scorer(s): (Sweden) Sofia Jakobsson (5 goals)
- Best player: (Switzerland) Ramona Bachmann

The UEFA Women's Under-19 Championship 2009 Final Tournament was held in Belarus from 13 to 25 July 2009. Players born on or after 1 January 1990 were eligible to participate in this competition. The tournament served as a qualifier for the 2010 FIFA U-20 Women's World Cup in Germany.

== Qualification ==
There were two qualification rounds.

	Teams entering in this round	Teams advancing from previous round	Competition format
First qualifying round (44 teams)	44 teams from associations ranked 2–53		11 groups of 4 teams, hosted by one nation, seeded into four pots by UEFA coefficient
Second qualifying round (24 teams)	Germany (top-seed)	11 group winners and runners-up from 1st qualifying round; best group third-place finisher from 1st qualifying round	6 groups of 4 teams, hosted by one nation, seeded into four pots by UEFA coefficient
Final tournament (8 teams)	Belarus (hosts)	6 group winners from 2nd qualifying round; best group runners-up from 2nd qualifying round	2 groups of 4 teams, semi-finals, final

=== First qualifying round ===
==== Group 1 ====
- Host country: Portugal.

Team	Pld	W	D	L	GF	GA	GD	Pts
Norway	3	2	1	0	14	0	+14	7
Romania	3	2	0	1	8	8	0	6
Portugal	3	1	1	1	2	4	−2	4
Faroe Islands	3	0	0	3	1	13	−12	0

26 September 2008

Portugal	1–4	Romania

26 September 2008

Norway	8–0	Faroe Islands

28 September 2008

Portugal	1–0	Faroe Islands

28 September 2008

Romania	0–6	Norway

1 October 2008

Norway	0–0	Portugal

1 October 2008

Faroe Islands	1–4	Romania

==== Group 2 ====
- Host country: Poland.

Team	Pld	W	D	L	GF	GA	GD	Pts
Austria	3	3	0	0	13	1	+12	9
Poland	3	2	0	1	8	6	+2	6
Armenia	3	0	1	2	3	9	−6	1
Turkey	3	0	1	2	4	12	−8	1

25 September 2008

Poland	3–0	Armenia

25 September 2008

Austria	5–0	Turkey

27 September 2008

Armenia	0–3	Austria

27 September 2008

Poland	4–1	Turkey

30 September 2008

Austria	5–1	Poland

30 September 2008

Turkey	3–3	Armenia

==== Group 3 ====
- Host country: Sweden.

Team	Pld	W	D	L	GF	GA	GD	Pts
Sweden	3	3	0	0	12	0	+12	9
Wales	3	2	0	1	5	3	+2	6
Croatia	3	1	0	2	1	7	−6	3
Latvia	3	0	0	3	0	8	−8	0

25 September 2008

Sweden	5–0	Croatia

25 September 2008

Wales	3–0	Latvia

27 September 2008

Croatia	0–2	Wales

27 September 2008

Sweden	4–0	Latvia

30 September 2008

Wales	0–3	Sweden

30 September 2008

Latvia	0–1	Croatia

==== Group 4 ====
- Host country: Lithuania.

Team	Pld	W	D	L	GF	GA	GD	Pts
Spain	3	2	1	0	22	1	+21	7
Netherlands	3	2	1	0	15	1	+14	7
Lithuania	3	1	0	2	3	19	−16	3
Cyprus	3	0	0	3	0	19	−19	0

25 September 2008

Spain	9–0	Cyprus

25 September 2008

Netherlands	7–0	Lithuania

27 September 2008

Netherlands	7–0	Cyprus

27 September 2008

Lithuania	0–12	Spain

30 September 2008

Spain	1–1	Netherlands

30 September 2008

Cyprus	0–3	Lithuania

==== Group 5 ====
- Host country: Slovenia.

Team	Pld	W	D	L	GF	GA	GD	Pts
England	3	2	1	0	9	3	+6	7
Slovakia	3	1	2	0	5	2	+3	5
Slovenia	3	1	0	2	2	7	−5	3
Scotland	3	0	1	2	2	6	−4	1

25 September 2008

Scotland	0–1	Slovenia

25 September 2008

England	1–1	Slovakia

27 September 2008

Scotland	0–0	Slovakia

27 September 2008

Slovenia	0–3	England

30 September 2008

England	5–2	Scotland

30 September 2008

Slovakia	4–1	Slovenia

==== Group 6 ====
- Host country: Azerbaijan.

Team	Pld	W	D	L	GF	GA	GD	Pts
Azerbaijan	3	3	0	0	4	1	+3	9
Finland	3	2	0	1	3	2	+1	6
Czech Republic	3	1	0	2	4	5	−1	3
Northern Ireland	3	0	0	3	1	4	−3	0

25 September 2008

Czech Republic	1–2	Azerbaijan

25 September 2008

Finland	1–0	Northern Ireland

27 September 2008

Czech Republic	2–1	Northern Ireland

27 September 2008

Azerbaijan	1–0	Finland

30 September 2008

Finland	2–1	Czech Republic

30 September 2008

Northern Ireland	0–1	Azerbaijan

==== Group 7 ====
- Host country: Israel.

Team	Pld	W	D	L	GF	GA	GD	Pts
Republic of Ireland	3	3	0	0	11	1	+10	9
Iceland	3	2	0	1	5	7	−2	6
Israel	3	0	1	2	1	5	−4	1
Greece	3	0	1	2	1	5	−4	1

24 September 2008

Iceland	2–1	Israel

24 September 2008

Republic of Ireland	3–0	Greece

26 September 2008

Iceland	2–1	Greece

26 September 2008

Israel	0–3	Republic of Ireland

29 September 2008

Republic of Ireland	5–1	Iceland

29 September 2008

Greece	0–0	Israel

==== Group 8 ====
- Host country: Bosnia-Herzegovina.

Team	Pld	W	D	L	GF	GA	GD	Pts
Hungary	3	3	0	0	19	4	+15	9
Russia	3	2	0	1	24	3	+21	6
Bosnia and Herzegovina	3	1	0	2	13	13	0	3
Moldova	3	0	0	3	0	36	−36	0

25 September 2008

Hungary	9–3	Bosnia and Herzegovina

25 September 2008

Russia	19–0	Moldova

27 September 2008

Hungary	7–0	Moldova

27 September 2008

Bosnia and Herzegovina	0–4	Russia

30 September 2008

Russia	1–3	Hungary

30 September 2008

Moldova	0–10	Bosnia and Herzegovina

==== Group 9 ====
- Host country: Macedonia.

Team	Pld	W	D	L	GF	GA	GD	Pts
France	3	3	0	0	17	0	+17	9
Belgium	3	2	0	1	25	4	+21	6
Macedonia	3	1	0	2	5	14	−9	3
Georgia	3	0	0	3	3	32	−29	0

25 September 2008

France	4–0	Macedonia

25 September 2008

Belgium	18–0	Georgia

27 September 2008

France	10–0	Georgia

27 September 2008

Macedonia	1–7	Belgium

30 September 2008

Belgium	0–3	France

30 September 2008

Georgia	3–4	Macedonia

==== Group 10 ====
- Host country: Serbia.

Team	Pld	W	D	L	GF	GA	GD	Pts
Denmark	3	2	1	0	13	2	+11	7
Switzerland	3	2	1	0	9	2	+7	7
Serbia	3	1	0	2	7	5	+2	3
Kazakhstan	3	0	0	3	0	20	−20	0

25 September 2008

Switzerland	2–0	Serbia

25 September 2008

Denmark	8–0	Kazakhstan

27 September 2008

Switzerland	5–0	Kazakhstan

27 September 2008

Serbia	0–3	Denmark

30 September 2008

Denmark	2–2	Switzerland

30 September 2008

Kazakhstan	0–7	Serbia

==== Group 11 ====
- Host country: Bulgaria.

Team	Pld	W	D	L	GF	GA	GD	Pts
Italy	3	3	0	0	17	1	+16	9
Ukraine	3	2	0	1	7	6	+1	6
Bulgaria	3	1	0	2	3	9	−6	3
Estonia	3	0	0	3	1	12	−11	0

25 September 2008

Ukraine	3–0	Bulgaria

25 September 2008

Italy	6–0	Estonia

27 September 2008

Ukraine	4–1	Estonia

27 September 2008

Bulgaria	1–6	Italy

30 September 2008

Italy	5–0	Ukraine

30 September 2008

Estonia	0–2	Bulgaria

==== Ranking of third-placed teams ====
Matches against the fourth-placed team in each of the groups are not included in this ranking.

Grp	Team	Pld	W	D	L	GF	GA	GD	Pts
1	Portugal	2	0	1	1	1	4	−3	1
6	Czech Republic	2	0	0	2	2	4	−2	0
7	Israel Greece	2	0	0	2	1	5	−4	0
10	Serbia	2	0	0	2	0	5	−5	0
5	Slovenia	2	0	0	2	1	7	−6	0
2	Armenia	2	0	0	2	0	6	−6	0
3	Croatia	2	0	0	2	0	7	−7	0
11	Bulgaria	2	0	0	2	1	9	−8	0
8	Bosnia and Herzegovina	2	0	0	2	3	13	−10	0
9	Macedonia	2	0	0	2	1	11	−10	0
4	Lithuania	2	0	0	2	0	19	−19	0

=== Second qualifying round ===
==== Group 1 ====
- Host country: Poland.

Team	Pld	W	D	L	GF	GA	GD	Pts
Iceland	3	1	2	0	5	4	+1	5
Sweden	3	1	2	0	1	0	+1	5
Denmark	3	1	0	2	3	4	−1	3
Poland	3	0	2	1	2	3	−1	2

23 April 2009
12:00

Denmark	2–3	Iceland

Stadion Ludowy, Sosnowiec

23 April 2009
15:00

Sweden	0–0	Poland

Stadion Miejski, Jaworzno

25 April 2009
12:00

Sweden	0–0	Iceland

Stadion Miejski, Jaworzno

25 April 2009
15:00

Poland	0–1	Denmark

Stadion Ludowy, Sosnowiec

28 April 2009
11:00

Denmark	0–1	Sweden

Stadion Ludowy, Sosnowiec

28 April 2009
11:00

Iceland	2–2	Poland

Stadion Miejski, Jaworzno

==== Group 2 ====
- Host country: Austria.

Team	Pld	W	D	L	GF	GA	GD	Pts
Norway	3	3	0	0	14	1	+13	9
Belgium	3	2	0	1	6	6	0	6
Austria	3	1	0	2	6	7	−1	3
Ukraine	3	0	0	3	4	16	−12	0

23 April 2009
13:00

Norway	5–1	Ukraine

Enzesfeld-Lindabrunn

23 April 2009
19:00

Austria	0–1	Belgium

Sportzentrum, Trumau

25 April 2009
11:00

Belgium	0–4	Norway

Enzesfeld-Lindabrunn

25 April 2009
17:00

Austria	6–1	Ukraine

Franz Kovacsich-Platz, Baumgarten

28 April 2009
19:00

Norway	5–0	Austria

Sportzentrum, Trumau

28 April 2009
19:00

Ukraine	2–5	Belgium

Franz Kovacsich-Platz, Baumgarten

==== Group 3 ====
- Host country: Portugal.

Team	Pld	W	D	L	GF	GA	GD	Pts
France	3	3	0	0	7	1	+6	9
Azerbaijan	3	1	1	1	4	4	0	4
Portugal	3	1	0	2	2	4	−2	3
Wales	3	0	1	2	4	8	−4	1

23 April 2009
18:00

France	4–1	Wales

Estádio Municipal, Oliveira do Bairro

23 April 2009
18:00

Azerbaijan	2–0	Portugal

Estádio Municipal Engenheiro Sílvio Henriques Cerveira, Anadia

25 April 2009
16:00

France	1–0	Portugal

Estádio Dr. Américo Couto, Mealhada

25 April 2009
16:00

Wales	2–2	Azerbaijan

Estádio Municipal de Águeda, Águeda

28 April 2009
16:00

Azerbaijan	0–2	France

Estádio Municipal Engenheiro Sílvio Henriques Cerveira, Anadia

28 April 2009
16:00

Portugal	2–1	Wales

Estádio Dr. Américo Couto, Mealhada

==== Group 4 ====
- Host country: Germany.

Team	Pld	W	D	L	GF	GA	GD	Pts
Germany	3	3	0	0	17	0	+17	9
Republic of Ireland	3	2	0	1	4	7	−3	6
Russia	3	1	0	2	2	5	−3	3
Slovakia	3	0	0	3	1	12	−11	0

23 April 2009
11:00

Germany	4–0	Russia

Frankenstadion, Heilbronn

23 April 2009
13:30

Republic of Ireland	3–1	Slovakia

Frankenstadion, Heilbronn

25 April 2009
14:45

Russia	0–1	Republic of Ireland

FC-Astoria-Stadion, Walldorf

25 April 2009
17:30

Germany	7–0	Slovakia

FC-Astoria-Stadion, Walldorf

28 April 2009
11:00

Republic of Ireland	0–6	Germany

Waldstadion, Viernheim

28 April 2009
11:00

Slovakia	0–2	Russia

Otto-Meister-Stadion, Öhringen

==== Group 5 ====
- Host country: Switzerland.

Team	Pld	W	D	L	GF	GA	GD	Pts
Switzerland	3	3	0	0	16	4	+12	9
Netherlands	3	1	1	1	12	8	+4	4
Italy	3	1	1	1	5	4	+1	4
Romania	3	0	0	3	1	18	−17	0

23 April 2009
19:00

Netherlands	8–0	Romania

Stadion Seefeld, Buochs

23 April 2009
19:30

Italy	0–3	Switzerland

Aengelgehr, Altbüron

25 April 2009
16:00

Italy	4–0	Romania

Aengelgehr, Altbüron

25 April 2009
16:00

Switzerland	7–3	Netherlands

Schöller-Meyer Fussballplatz, Brunnen

28 April 2009
19:00

Netherlands	1–1	Italy

Schöller-Meyer Fussballplatz, Brunnen

28 April 2009
19:00

Romania	1–6	Switzerland

Stadion Seefeld, Buochs

==== Group 6 ====
- Host country: Hungary.

Team	Pld	W	D	L	GF	GA	GD	Pts
England	3	3	0	0	10	0	+10	9
Spain	3	2	0	1	7	4	+3	6
Hungary	3	1	0	2	3	9	−6	3
Finland	3	0	0	3	0	7	−7	0

23 April 2009
14:30

Hungary	0–4	England

Perutz Stadion, Pápa

23 April 2009
17:30

Spain	2–0	Finland

Gyirmóti Stadion, Győr

25 April 2009
14:30

England	3–0	Spain

Perutz Stadion, Pápa

25 April 2009
17:30

Hungary	2–0	Finland

Gyirmóti Stadion, Győr

28 April 2009
15:30

Spain	5–1	Hungary

Gyirmóti Stadion, Győr

28 April 2009
15:30

Finland	0–3	England

Perutz Stadion, Pápa

==== Ranking of second-placed teams ====
Matches against the fourth-placed team in each of the groups are not included in this ranking.

Grp	Team	Pld	W	D	L	GF	GA	GD	Pts
1	Sweden	2	1	1	0	1	0	+1	4
6	Spain	2	1	0	1	5	4	+1	3
3	Azerbaijan	2	1	0	1	2	2	0	3
2	Belgium	2	1	0	1	1	4	−3	3
4	Republic of Ireland	2	1	0	1	1	6	−5	3
5	Netherlands	2	0	1	1	4	8	−4	1

== Final tournament ==
=== Group stage ===
==== Group A ====
Pos	Team	Pld	W	D	L	GF	GA	GD	Pts	Qualification
1	France	3	2	0	1	6	2	+4	6 (Note: Head-to-head points: France 3, Switzerland 0.)	Knockout stage
2	Switzerland	3	2	0	1	7	3	+4	6	Knockout stage
3	Germany	3	2	0	1	11	4	+7	6	
4	Belarus	3	0	0	3	1	16	−15	0	

Notes:
13 July 2009

France	1–2	Germany
Barbance 7'	(Report)	Wich 35', 36'

Torpedo Stadium, Minsk
Attendance: 750
Referee: Efthalia Mitsi (Greece)

13 July 2009

Belarus	1–4	Switzerland
Miklashevich 52'	(Report)	Stein 12'; Crnogorčević 25'; Mehmeti 29'; Baer 41'

City Stadium, Borisov
Attendance: 4,000
Referee: Elia María Martínez Martínez (Spain)

16 July 2009

Belarus	0–3	France
	(Report)	Rubio 12'; Barbance 83', 84'

City Stadium, Borisov
Attendance: 2,500
Referee: Yuliya Medvedeva-Keldyusheva (Kazakhstan)

16 July 2009

Switzerland	3–0	Germany
Crnogorčević 3'; Bachmann 65'; Stein 78'	(Report)

Torpedo Stadium, Minsk
Attendance: 800
Referee: Teodora Albon (Romania)

19 July 2009

Germany	9–0	Belarus
Marozsán 6', 7', 10'; Bagehorn 23'; Mirlach 27' (pen.); Huth 31'; Wermelt 35'; Popp 62'; Wagner 77'	(Report)

Darida Stadium, Minsk
Attendance: 2,450
Referee: Sandra Braz Bastos (Portugal)

19 July 2009

Switzerland	0–2	France
	(Report)	Crammer 52'; Barbance 80'

Torpedo Stadium, Minsk
Attendance: 700
Referee: Carina Susanna Vitulano (Italy)

==== Group B ====
Pos	Team	Pld	W	D	L	GF	GA	GD	Pts	Qualification
1	England	3	2	1	0	7	0	+7	7	Knockout stage
2	Sweden	3	2	0	1	4	5	−1	6	Knockout stage
3	Norway	3	0	2	1	1	2	−1	2	
4	Iceland	3	0	1	2	1	6	−5	1	

13 July 2009

Sweden	0–3	England
	(Report)	Moore 20'; Duggan 36'; Weston 65'

Darida Stadium, Minsk
Attendance: 2,900
Referee: Carina Susanna Vitulano (Italy)

13 July 2009

Iceland	0–0	Norway
	(Report)

City Stadium, Molodechno
Attendance: 3,852
Referee: Yuliya Medvedeva-Keldyusheva (Kazakhstan)

16 July 2009

Sweden	2–1	Iceland
Jakobsson 77'; Hjohlman 88'	(Report)	Asgrimsdottir 45+2'

Darida Stadium, Minsk
Attendance: 2,530
Referee: Sandra Braz Bastos (Portugal)

16 July 2009

England	0–0	Norway
	(Report)

City Stadium, Molodechno
Attendance: 3,043
Referee: Elia María Martínez Martínez (Spain)

19 July 2009

Norway	1–2	Sweden
Pedersen 4'	(Report)	Göransson 35'; Jakobsson 44'

Traktor Stadium, Minsk
Attendance: 3,180
Referee: Teodora Albon (Romania)

19 July 2009

England	4–0	Iceland
Moore 11'; Nobbs 13', 80'; Christiansen 77'	(Report)

City Stadium, Molodechno
Attendance: 1,700
Referee: Efthalia Mitsi (Greece)

=== Knockout stage ===
Semi-finals
France	2
Sweden (a.e.t.)	5
England	3
Switzerland	0

Final
Sweden	0
England	2

==== Semifinals ====
22 July 2009

France	2–5 (a.e.t.)	Sweden
Tenret 34'; Sasso 68'	(Report)	Lövgren 24'; Jakobsson 86', 91', 107'; Egelryd 100'

Darida Stadium, Minsk
Attendance: 3,300
Referee: Efthalia Mitsi (Greece)

22 July 2009

England	3–0	Switzerland
Duggan 28', 55'; Christiansen 45'	(Report)

City Stadium, Molodechno
Attendance: 3,721
Referee: Yuliya Medvedeva-Keldyusheva (Kazakhstan)

==== Final ====
25 July 2009

Sweden	0–2	England
	(Report)	Duggan 33'; Nobbs 37'

City Stadium, Borisov
Attendance: 4,500
Referee: Teodora Albon (Romania)

Sweden	England

SWEDEN:
GK	12	Hilda Carlén
DF	4	Emma Kullberg		(substituted off) 80'
DF	5	Emelie Lövgren
DF	6	Cecilia Borgström		(substituted off) 58'
MF	2	Josefine Alfsson	(yellow card) 76'
MF	7	Emilia Appelqvist (c)
MF	10	Tilda Heimersson
MF	13	Catrine Johansson
MF	15	Antonia Göransson
FW	9	Sofia Jakobsson
FW	17	Jennifer Egelryd		(substituted off) 46'
Substitutes:
FW	18	Jenny Hjohlman		(substituted on) 46'
MF	8	Julia Lyckberg		(substituted on) 58'
FW	11	Olivia Schough		(substituted on) 80'
Manager:
Calle Barrling

ENGLAND:
GK	1	Rebecca Spencer
DF	2	Chelsea Weston
DF	3	Gilly Flaherty
DF	5	Lucia Bronze
MF	4	Remi Allen
MF	6	Kerys Harrop
MF	7	Isobel Christiansen		(substituted off) 79'
MF	8	Jordan Nobbs
MF	10	Michelle Hinnigan (c)		(substituted off) 67'
MF	11	Jade Moore	(yellow card) 86'
FW	9	Toni Duggan
Substitutes:
MF	14	Laura Coombs		(substituted on) 67'
FW	16	Jess Holbrook		(substituted on) 79'
Manager:
Maureen Marley

MATCH OFFICIALS

- Assistant referees:
  - Maja Dovnik (Slovenia)
  - Paula Brady (Ireland)
- Fourth official: Carina Vitulano (Italy)

== Awards ==
2009 UEFA Women's Under-19 European champions

England
First title

== Goalscorers ==
5 goals

- (Sweden) Sofia Jakobsson

4 goals

- (England) Toni Duggan
- (France) Solène Barbance

3 goals

- (England) Jordan Nobbs
- (Germany) Dzsenifer Marozsán

2 goals

- (England) Isobel Christiansen
- (England) Jade Moore
- (Germany) Jessica Wich
- (Switzerland) Ana-Maria Crnogorčević

1 goal

- (Belarus) Ekaterina Miklashevich
- (England) Chelsea Weston
- (France) Pauline Crammer
- (France) Léa Rubio
- (France) Charlène Sasso
- (France) Fanny Tenret
- (Germany) Marie-Louise Bagehorn
- (Germany) Svenja Huth
- (Germany) Stefanie Mirlach
- (Germany) Alexandra Popp
- (Germany) Selina Wagner
- (Germany) Lena Wermelt
- (Iceland) Arna Sif Asgrimsdottir
- (Norway) Cecilie Pedersen
- (Sweden) Jennifer Egelryd
- (Sweden) Antonia Göransson
- (Sweden) Jenny Hjohlman
- (Sweden) Emelie Lövgren
- (Switzerland) Ramona Bachmann
- (Switzerland) Bettina Baer
- (Switzerland) Jehona Mehmeti
