= 2008 UEFA Women's Under-19 Championship =

Tournament details
- Host country: France
- Dates: 7–19 July
- Teams: 8

Final positions
- Champions: Italy (1st title)
- Runners-up: Norway

Tournament statistics
- Matches played: 15
- Goals scored: 41 (2.73 per match)
- Attendance: 14,185 (946 per match)
- Top scorer(s): (Germany) Marie Pollmann (4 goals)
- Best player: (Italy) Sara Gama

The UEFA Women's U-19 Championship 2008 Final Tournament was held in France between 7–19 July 2008. Players born after 1 January 1989 were eligible to participate in this competition.

== Qualification ==
There were two qualification rounds.

	Teams entering in this round	Teams advancing from previous round	Competition format
First qualifying round (44 teams)	44 teams from associations ranked 1–53		11 groups of 4 teams, hosted by one club, seeded into four pots by UEFA coefficient
Second qualifying round (24 teams)		11 group winners and runners-up from 1st qualifying round; best two group third-place finishers from 1st qualifying round	6 groups of 4 teams, hosted by one club, seeded into four pots by UEFA coefficient
Final tournament (8 teams)	France (hosts)	6 group winners from 2nd qualifying round; best group runners-up from 2nd qualifying round	2 groups of 4 teams, semi-finals, final

== Final tournament ==
=== Group stage ===
==== Group A ====
Team	Pts	Pld	W	D	L	GF	GA
Italy	6	3	2	0	1	4	4
Norway	4	3	1	1	1	3	3
France	4	3	1	1	1	3	4
Spain	3	3	1	0	2	4	3

July 7, 2008

Italy	1–0	Norway
Bonetti 90'	(Report)

Stade Jules Ladoumègue, Romorantin-Lanthenay
Referee: Marija Damjanovic (Croatia)

July 7, 2008

France	1–0	Spain
Machart 59'	(Report)

Stade Les Allées, Blois
Referee: Cristina Dorcioman (Romania)

July 10, 2008

Spain	1–2	Norway
Flaviano 90+1'	(Report)	Herregården 58'; Hansen 75'

Stade Georges Boulogne, Amboise
Referee: Tanja Subotic (Slovenia)

July 10, 2008

France	1–3	Italy
Le Sommer 62'	(Report)	Barreca 34'; Gueli 69'; Bonometti 89'

Stade Les Allées, Blois
Referee: Kateryna Monzul (Ukraine)

July 13, 2008

Norway	1–1	France
Mjelde 35'	(Report)	Le Sommer 73'

Stade Jules Ladoumègue, Romorantin-Lanthenay
Referee: Hilal Tuba Tosun Ayer (Turkey)

July 13, 2008

Spain	3–0	Italy
Ruiz 25'; Meseguer 61'; González 88'	(Report)

Vineuil
Referee: Jana Adamkova (Czech Republic)

==== Group B ====
Team	Pts	Pld	W	D	L	GF	GA
Germany	7	3	2	1	0	10	1
Sweden	5	3	1	2	0	4	3
England	4	3	1	1	1	4	4
Scotland	0	3	0	0	3	2	12

July 7, 2008

Sweden	2–1	Scotland
Konradsson 69'; Sjöstedt 90+4'	(Report)	Murray 82'

Stade Georges Boulogne, Amboise
Referee: Hilal Tuba Tosun Ayer (Turkey)

July 7, 2008

Germany	2–0	England
Pollmann 35', 59'	(Report)

Péteseilles, Avoine
Referee: Kateryna Monzul (Ukraine)

July 10, 2008

Sweden	1–1	Germany
Jakobsson 31'	(Report)	Pollmann 25'

Stade Guy Drut, Saint-Cyr-sur-Loire
Referee: Jana Adamkova (Czech Republic)

July 10, 2008

Scotland	1–3	England
Littlejohn 6'	(Report)	Nobbs 4'; Duggan 45+4', 74'

Péteseilles, Avoine
Referee: Marija Damjanovic (Croatia)

July 13, 2008

England	1–1	Sweden
Duggan 10'	(Report)	Fors 63' (pen.); Fors (yellow card) 45' (yellow-red card) 64'

Stade Guy Drut, Saint-Cyr-sur-Loire
Referee: Cristina Dorcioman (Romania)

July 13, 2008

Scotland	0–7	Germany
	(Report)	Schwab 10', 45+1'; Kulig 18'; Pollmann 32'; Mirlach 37'; Hegering 47'; Wagner 64'

Stade Georges Boulogne, Amboise
Referee: Tanja Subotic (Slovenia)

=== Knockout stage ===
Semifinals – July 16
1A	Italy	4
2B	Sweden	0
1B	Germany	1 (2)
2A	Norway	1 (4)

National Championship – July 19
Italy	1
Norway	0

==== Semifinals ====
July 16, 2008

Germany	1–1 (a.e.t.)	Norway
Mirlach 2'	(Report)	Enget 49'
Penalties
Hegering (penalty missed); Wagner (penalty missed); Pollmann (penalty scored); Mirlach (penalty scored)	2–4	(penalty missed) Mjelde; (penalty scored) Isaksen; (penalty scored) Ree; (penalty scored) Andresen; (penalty scored) Enget

Vallée du Cher, Tours
Referee: Hilal Tuba Tosun Ayer (Turkey)

July 16, 2008

Italy	4–0	Sweden
Gueli 37', 75'; Bonometti 54'; Parisi 72' (pen.)	(Report)

Stade Les Allées, Blois
Referee: Kateryna Monzul (Ukraine)

==== Final ====
July 19, 2008

Italy	1–0	Norway
Parisi 71' (pen.)	(Report)

Vallée du Cher, Tours
Attendance: 2,500
Referee: Cristina Dorcioman (Romania)

Italy	Norway

ITALY:
GK	12	Sara Penzo
DF	15	Eleonora Bussu
DF	3	Sara Gama (c)
DF	6	Francesca Sampietro
DF	2	Diletta Crespi		(substituted off) 65'
MF	8	Alessandra Barreca
MF	10	Alice Parisi
MF	4	Silvia Pisano
FW	11	Pamela Gueli	(yellow card) 43'	(substituted off) 72'
FW	9	Sabrina Marchese	(yellow card) 44'	(substituted off) 46'
MF	7	Cristina Bonometti
Substitutes:
MF	16	Laura Fusetti	(yellow card) 74'	(substituted on) 46'
DF	13	Michela Rodella		(substituted on) 65'
FW	7	Tatiana Bonetti		(substituted on) 72'
Manager:
Corrado Corradini

NORWAY:
GK	1	Ingrid Thorbjørnsen
DF	5	Gunhild Herregården
DF	7	Maren Mjelde (c)
DF	3	Caroline Walde
DF	2	Astrid Ree	(substituted off) 82'
MF	11	June Tårnes	(substituted off) 58'
MF	16	Kathrine Andresen	(substituted off) 76'
MF	8	Ingrid Moe Wold
FW	9	Ingvild Isaksen
FW	10	Ida Elise Enget
FW	13	Hege Hansen
Substitutes:
DF	17	Ingrid Ryland	(substituted on) 58'
MF	6	Maritha Eide	(substituted on) 76'
FW	15	Cathrine Dyngvold	(substituted on) 82'
Manager:
Jarl Torske

MATCH OFFICIALS

- Assistant referees:
  - Tonja Paavola (Finland)
  - Judit Kulcsár (Hungary)
- Fourth official: Kateryna Monzul (Ukraine)

== Awards ==
2008 UEFA Women's Under-19 champions

Italy
First title

== Goalscorers ==
4 goals

- (Germany) Marie Pollmann

3 goals

- (England) Toni Duggan
- (Italy) Pamela Gueli

2 goals

- (France) Eugénie Le Sommer
- (Germany) Stefanie Mirlach
- (Germany) Lisa Schwab
- (Italy) Cristina Bonometti
- (Italy) Alice Parisi

1 goal

- (England) Jordan Nobbs
- (Spain) Joana Flaviano
- (Spain) Sara González
- (Spain) Silvia Meseguer
- (Spain) Rocío Ruiz
- (France) Julie Machart
- (Germany) Marina Hegering
- (Germany) Kim Kulig
- (Germany) Selina Wagner
- (Italy) Alessandra Barreca
- (Italy) Tatiana Bonetti
- (Norway) Ida Elise Enget
- (Norway) Hege Hansen
- (Norway) Gunhild Herregården
- (Norway) Maren Mjelde
- (Scotland) Ruesha Littlejohn
- (Scotland) Christie Murray
- (Sweden) Louise Fors
- (Sweden) Sofia Jakobsson
- (Sweden) Emmelie Konradsson
- (Sweden) Sara Sjöstedt
