= La Marina (Cantabria) =

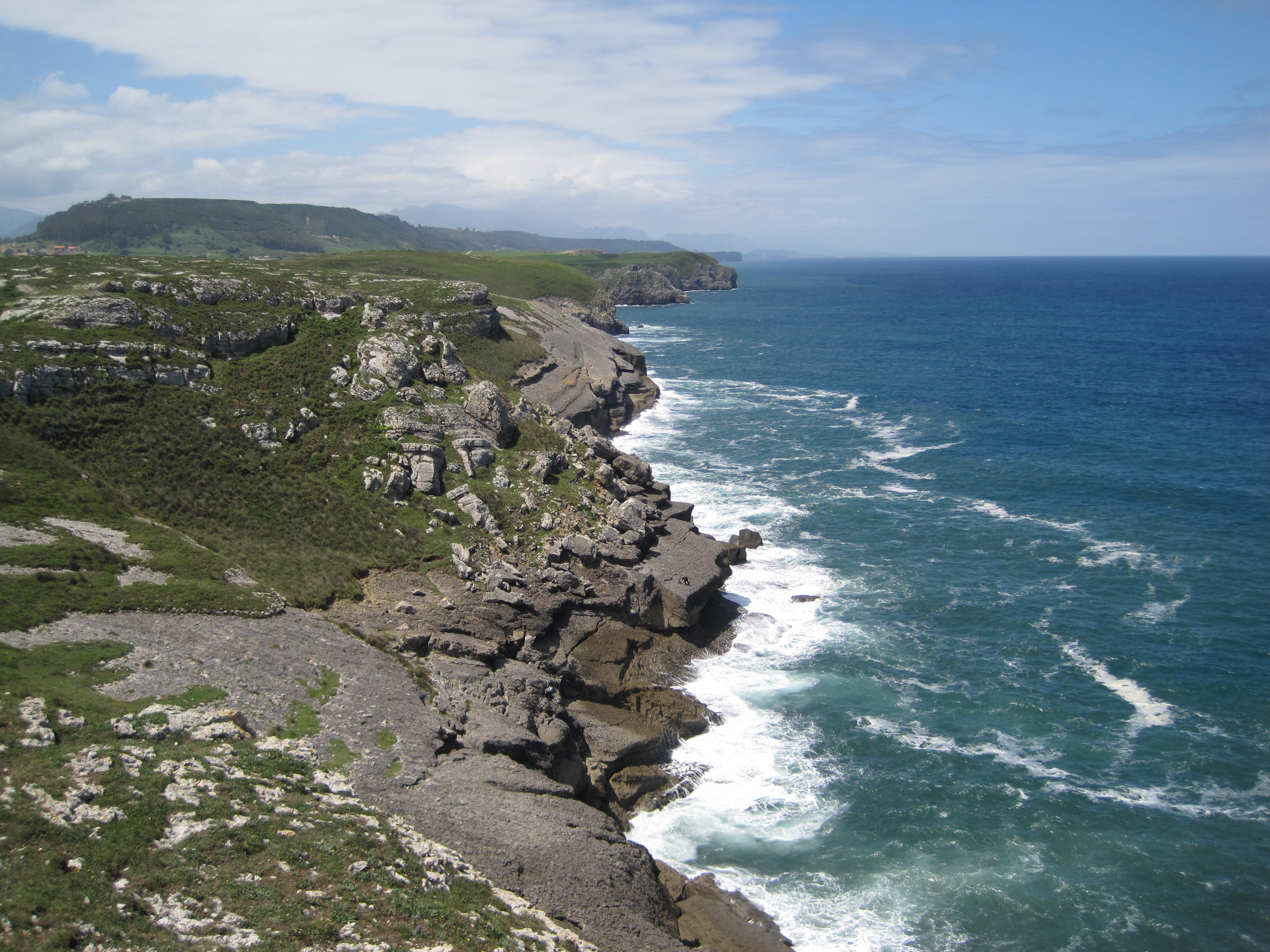
Cliffs near San Vicente.

La Marina is the name traditionally given to the area of Cantabria (autonomous community of Spain) facing the sea, in contrast to La Montaña, its inland part. The differences between the two are orographic, climatic and ecological as well as anthropological and ethnographic. In the case of La Marina, which occupies only a third of the autonomous community, the orography and climate are gentle, the population density is much higher and, therefore, it has a higher level of development. Several of the largest population centers in the region are located in this area, with its capital, Santander, standing out. Chapter 2 of the Regional Land Use Plan of Cantabria defines La Marina as a distinguishable physical environment, with a milder climate and relief than inland Cantabria, and with a higher population development.

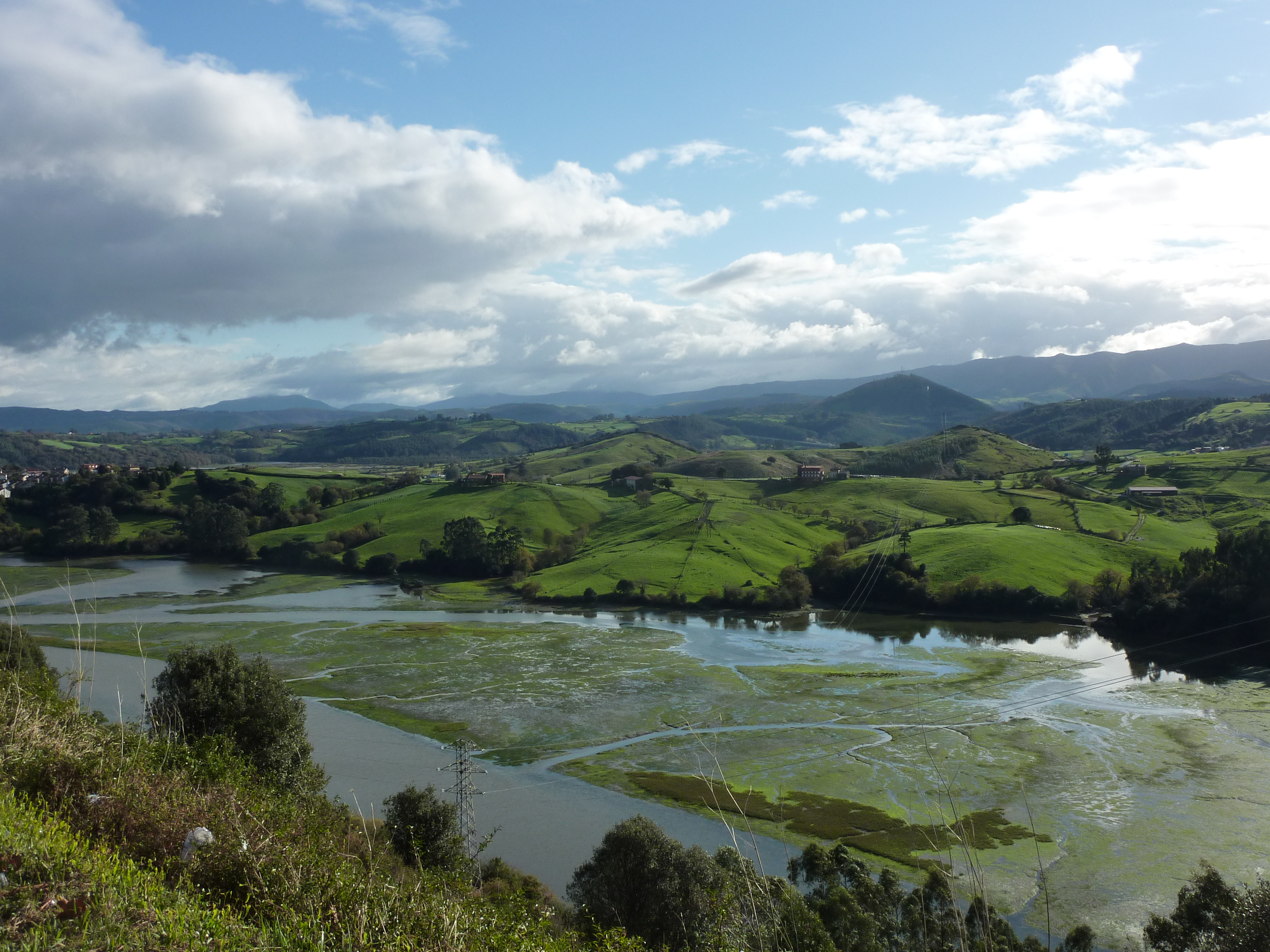
Landscape of La Marina with low valleys, estuary in the foreground

Historically, La Marina has been occupied by human societies since the Lower Paleolithic, although it maintained a low population density and a little humanized landscape until the 9th century, when it is known that there was a process of repopulation sustained in the monasteries in the Asturias of Santillana and Trasmiera; From then on, the situation of the Cantabrian coastal populations was similar to those of Biscay, where the largest abbeys of the time were concentrated along the coastal cliffs, developing population centers around them during the 10th century. The monasteries, in both territories, controlled the maritime and fluvial fishing resources.

== Physical geography ==
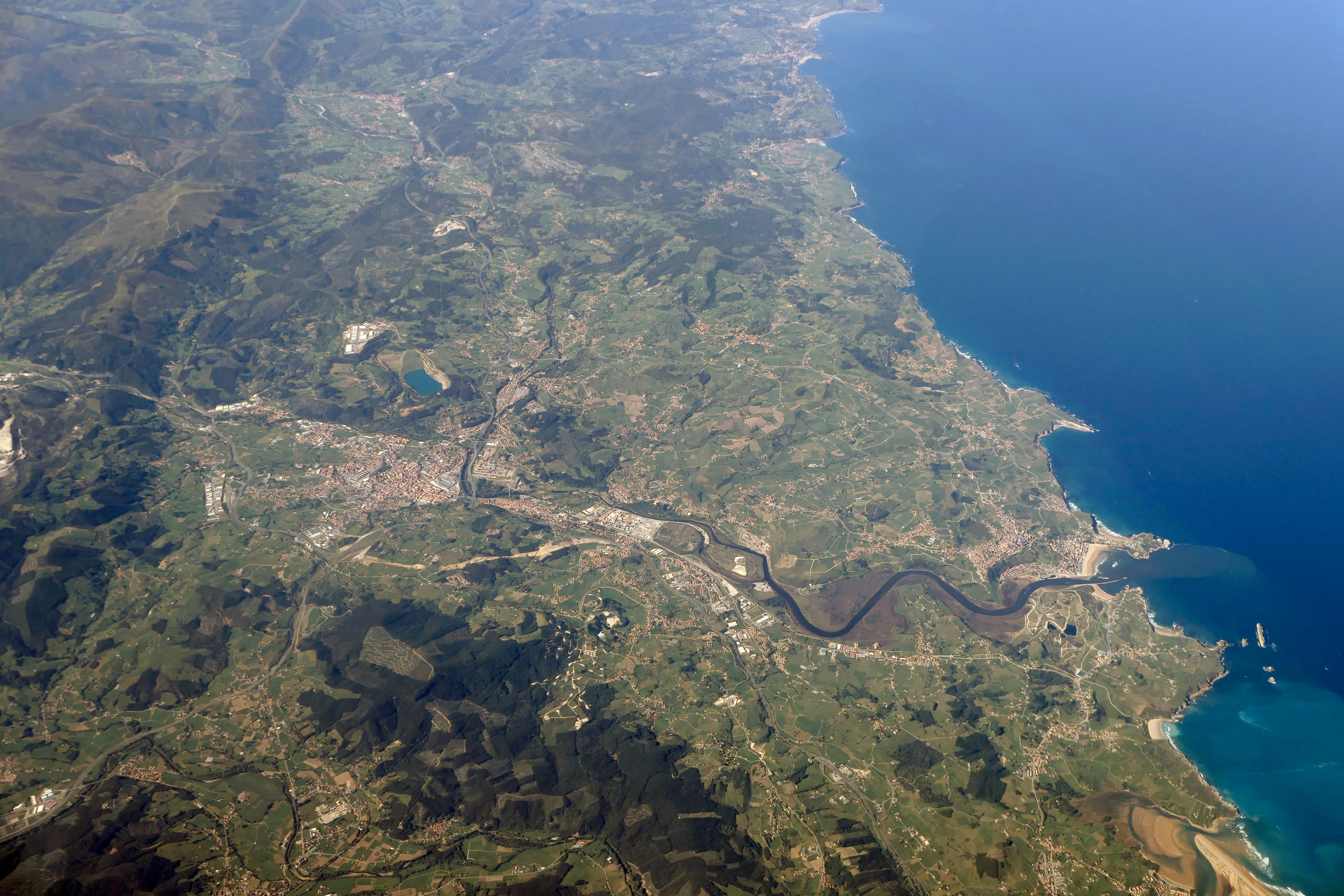
Aerial view of part of La Marina around Torrelavega.

The borders between Marina and Montaña are usually fixed geographically in the Sierra del Escudo de Cabuérniga, a mountain range that cuts the Cantabrian valleys, generally perpendicular to the sea, and from which the Cantabrian mountain range abandons the steep relief for a much gentler one, which descends in steps to the coast without exceeding, with some exceptions, 200 m above sea level. These lands emerged from the sea during the Quaternary era and were progressively eroded from their fractures, so that the current depressions are coincident with fault lines. Several of them are today the beds of the great rivers of the region, such as the Besaya and the Asón, as well as shaping the bay of Santander and other coastal areas. At the same time, plate tectonics caused the slight uplift of some areas. Examples of the unevenness of erosion are La Masera, a hill located next to the San Martín de la Arena estuary, and Mount Vispieres. The dolomitic and limestone areas withstood the climate better. Its heights are generically called Sierras Litorales, which includes the mountain ranges of Udías-Novales, Camargo, Peña Cabarga, Monte Buciero and Cerredo.

== See also ==
- Ethnography of Cantabria
- Coast of Cantabria
