= Penzo =

Penzo is an Italian surname. Notable people with the surname include:

- Domenico Penzo (born 1953), Italian footballer
- Jacobo Penzo (born 1948), Venezuelan film director
- Sara Penzo (born 1989), Italian footballer
