= Gándara =

River in Spain

Gándara Soba
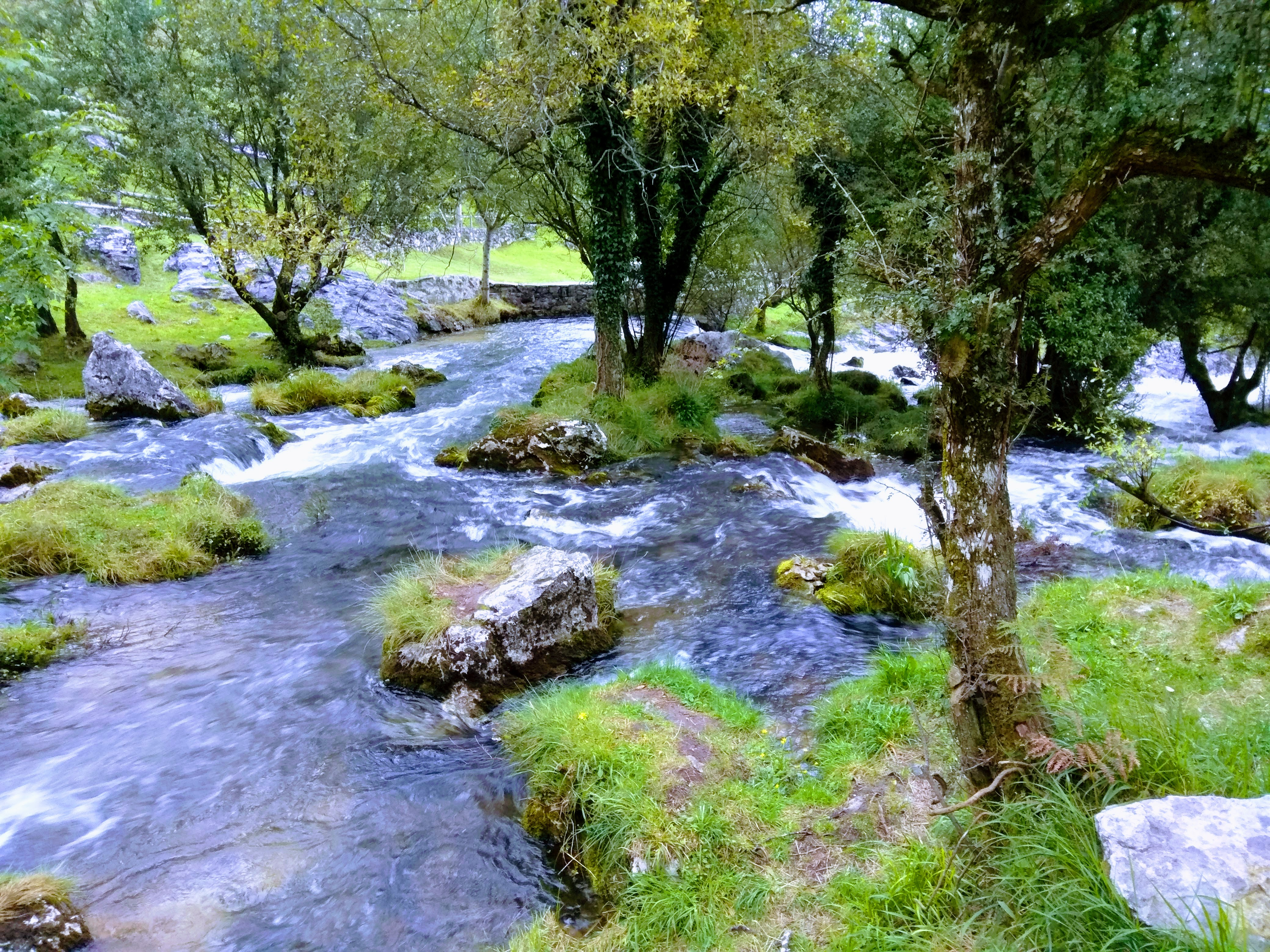

Location
- Country: Spain
- State: Cantabria

Physical characteristics
- Source
  - elevation: 950 m (3,120 ft)
- Mouth
  - location: Ramales de la Victoria
- Length: 18 km (11 mi)
- Discharge
  - location: Asón River

Basin features
- Tributaries
  - left: Rocío
  - right: Rovente, Astrón, Calera

The Gándara (also known as the Soba River) is a river in Green Spain, at the north of the country. It flows through the autonomous community of Cantabria and discharges into the Asón River. The Gándara offers trout fishing.

The river's name comes from the plains where it is born, known as La Gándara, under the Becerral crag. It flows from west to east until it reaches the Bolea and Regules bridge, where it changes direction towards the north. Not much later it changes again, to the east. In some areas, it detours round steep mountains; sometimes it plunges from considerable heights.

The river is also known for various caves such as the Cueto-Coventosa ,Tibia-Fresca, Tonio-Cañuela and the Sistema Gándara.

== See also ==
- List of rivers of Spain
