= Rodella =

Rodella is a surname. Notable people with the surname include:

- Alvise Rodella (born 2007), Italian racing driver
- Debbie Rodella (born 1961), American politician
- Michela Rodella (born 1989), Italian footballer
