= Sierra del Escudo de Cabuérniga =

Mountain range in Cantabria, Spain

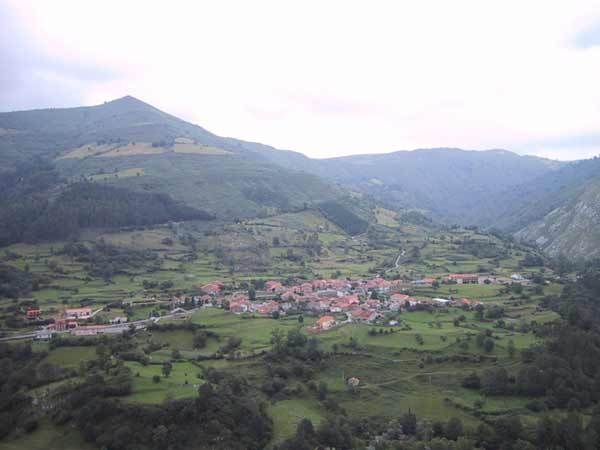
- View of the range above Celis, a village of Rionansa municipality

Highest point
- Peak: Gándara
- Elevation: 927 m (3,041 ft)

Dimensions
- Length: 50 km (31 mi) E/W
- Width: 15 km (9.3 mi) N/S

Geography
- Location within Spain
- Country: Spain
- Region: Asturias
- Range coordinates: 43°16′N 4°19′W
- Parent range: Cantabrian Mountains

Geology
- Orogeny: Alpine orogeny
- Rock age: Mesozoic
- Rock type: Sandstone

The Sierra del Escudo de Cabuérniga is a mountain range in Cantabria, Spain. It is a northern foothill of the Cantabrian Mountains, located between the main ranges and the Bay of Biscay. Its highest point is 927 m high Gándara.

Traditionally in Cantabria this range has been considered the border between La Marina (The Coast) and La Montaña (The Mountain).

== Geography ==
The Sierra del Escudo de Cabuérniga runs parallel to the coast, separated 15–20 km from it. The altitude of its summits averages between 600 and 1,000 metres above sea level.

The range is broken in several places by gorges eroded by the rivers which flow perpendicularly from the Cantabrian Mountains into the sea. Its continuity is very well marked in the western zone of Cantabria, while to the east, its orography starts to dilute, although the appearance of great faults mark its East-West route. The Escudo River has its sources in this range.

Geologically the Sierra del Escudo de Cabuérniga is an inverted basin geological fault where Paleozoico stands exposed, along with Mesozoic rocks of the Jurassic and Cretacean periods.

787.02 hectares of the central strip of the range, near Carmona, are catalogued as a Site of Community Importance.
