= Rocío =

Rocío is a feminine given name of Spanish origin, derived from the Virgin of El Rocío and ultimately from the Latin Roscidus, literally meaning dew. Notable people with the name include:

- Rocío Banquells (born 1958), Mexican pop singer and actress
- Rocío Bueno (born 1992), Argentine footballer
- Rocío Campigli (born 1994), Argentine handball player
- Rocío Carrasco (born 1977), Spanish TV presenter and businesswoman
- Rocío Comba (born 1987), Argentine discus thrower
- Rocío Dúrcal (1944–2006), Spanish singer and actress
- Rocío González Navas (born 1953), former First Lady of Ecuador
- Rocío González Zúñiga, Peruvian politician
- Rocío Hernández (born 1985), Puerto Rican footballer
- Rocío Igarzábal (born 1989), Argentine actress, singer and model
- Rocío Jurado (1946–2006), Spanish singer and actress
- Rocío Marengo (born 1980), Argentine model and actress
- Rocío Monasterio (born 1974), Spanish entrepreneur and politician
- Rocío Orsi (1976–2014), Spanish philosopher and professor
- Rocío Ríos (born 1969), Spanish long-distance runner
- Rocío Ruiz, Spanish footballer
- Rocío Sánchez Moccia (born 1988), Argentine field hockey player
- Rocío Urquijo (1935–2009), Spanish artist
- Rocío Ybarra (born 1984), Spanish field hockey player

== See also ==
- Virgin of El Rocío
- Hermitage of El Rocío, Almonte
- Romería de El Rocío pilgrimage
