= Catrine Johansson =

Swedish footballer (born 1991)

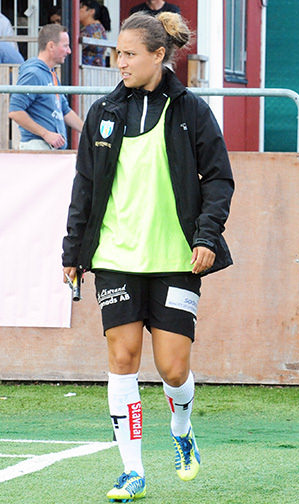

Personal information
- Full name: Catrine Louise Jahansson
- Date of birth: 18 December 1991 (age 34)
- Place of birth: Gothenburg, Sweden
- Height: 1.69 m (5 ft 7 in)
- Position: Defender

Youth career
- Ytterby IS

Senior career*
Years	Team	Apps	(Gls)
2007–2022	BK Häcken	193	(3)

International career
2010	Sweden U20	3	(0)
- * Club domestic league appearances and goals

Catrine Johansson (born 18 December 1991) is a Swedish footballer who plays as a defender.

== Honours ==
Kopparbergs/Göteborg FC

- Svenska Supercupen: 2013; runner-up: 2012
- Svenska Cupen: 2012
