= Marie Pollmann =

German footballer (born 1989)

Personal information
- Date of birth: 10 February 1997 (age 29)
- Place of birth: Salzkotten, Germany
- Height: 1.75 m (5 ft 9 in)
- Position: Forward

Marie Pollmann (born 13 September 1989) is a German footballer who plays as a forward for FSV Gütersloh 2009.

== International career ==
Pollmann represented Germany at youth level.
