= Emelie Lövgren =

Swedish footballer (born 1990)

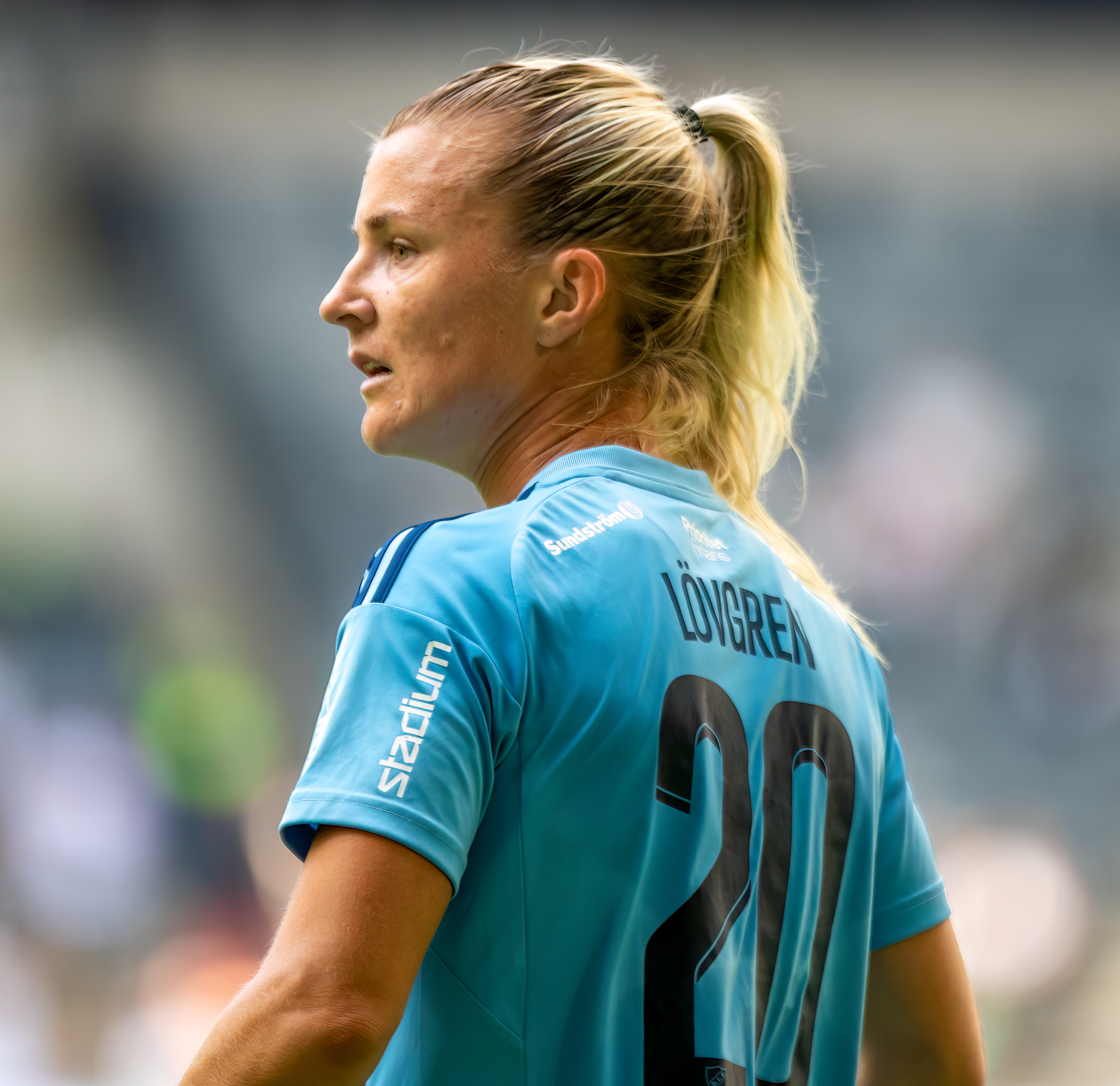
- Emilie Lövgren in 2022

Personal information
- Date of birth: 3 July 1990 (age 36)
- Place of birth: Piteå, Sweden
- Height: 1.71 m (5 ft 7 1/2 in)
- Position: Defender

Team information
- Current team: Djurgården
- Number: 20

Senior career*
Years	Team	Apps	(Gls)
2009–2020	Piteå IF	176	(5)
2020–2021	Arna-Bjørnar	34	(2)
2022-	Djurgården	2	(0)
- * Club domestic league appearances and goals as of 22 February 2020 (UTC)

Emelie Lövgren (born 3 July 1990) is a Swedish football defender currently playing for Djurgården in the Damallsvenskan. In 2018, she became Swedish national champion with Piteå IF.

== Career ==
Lövgren started playing football at the age of five for Storfors AIK.

Lövgren played for Piteå IF in the Damallsvenskan in 2009. For the 2010 season, she joined Sunnanå SK. In 2011, Lövgren returned to Piteå IF. In 2018, she became Swedish champion with Piteå IF. After the 2019 season, she left Piteå, having played a total of 160 matches in the Damallsvenskan for the club.

For the 2020 season, Lövgren joined Norwegian side Arna-Bjørnar. After two seasons in Norway, she signed a three-year contract with Djurgårdens IF for the 2022 season.
