= Ekaterina Miklashevich =

Belarusian footballer

Personal information
- Date of birth: 25 January 1992 (age 34)
- Place of birth: Belarus
- Height: 1.80 m (5 ft 11 in)
- Position: Goalkeeper (since 2013)Defender (until 2012)

Team information
- Current team: ALG
- Number: 1

Senior career*
Years	Team	Apps	(Gls)
2010–2017	Minsk	113	(13)
2018	Bobruichanka	6	(0)
2020–	Lokomotiv Moscow	7	(0)
2024	Gaziantep Asya	4	(0)
2024–	ALG	3	(0)

International career^{‡}
2009–2010	Belarus U19	4+	(1)
2020–	Belarus	1	(0)
- * Club domestic league appearances and goals as of 22 September 2024 ‡ National team caps and goals as of 17 February 2024

Ekaterina Miklashevich (Belarusian: Кацярына Міклашэвіч; born 25 January 1992) is a Belarusian women's football goalkeeper who plays in the Turkish Super League for ALG and the Belarus women's national team.

== Club career ==
Miklashevich has played for FC Minsk and Bobruichanka Bobruisk in Belarus and for Lokomotiv Moscow in Russia.

In January 2024, she moved to Turkey, and signed with Gaziantep Asya to play as a goalkeeper in the second half of the 2023-24 Turkish Women's Football Super League season.

For the 2024–25 Turkish Super League season, she transferred to ALG in Gaziantep.

== International career ==
Miklashevich capped for Belarus at senior level during the UEFA Women's Euro 2022 qualifying.
