= Jenny Hjohlman =

Swedish footballer (born 1990)

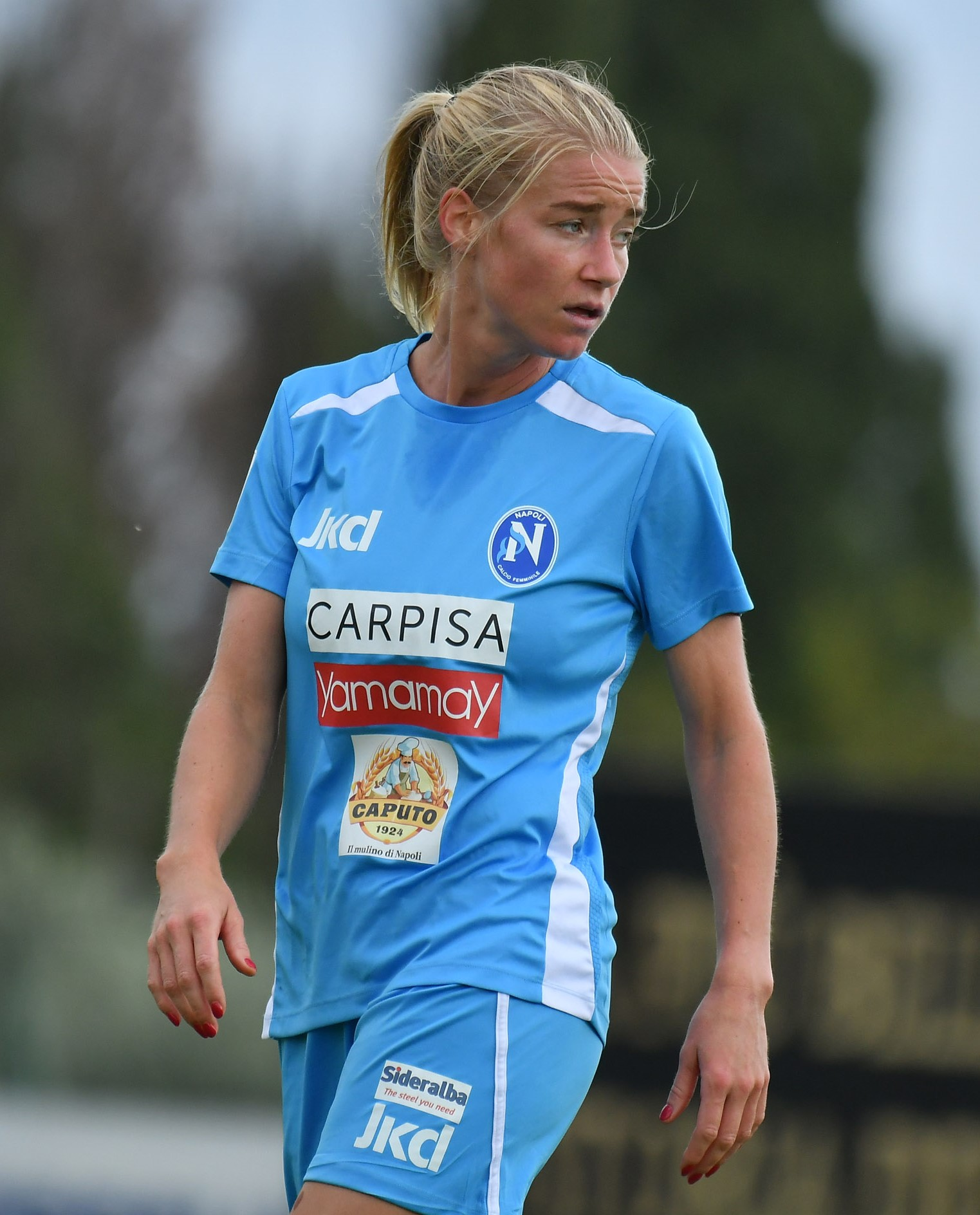
- Hjohlman with Napoli in 2021

Personal information
- Full name: Jenny Josefina Hjohlman
- Date of birth: 13 February 1990 (age 36)
- Place of birth: Sweden
- Height: 1.68 m (5 ft 6 in)
- Position: Forward

Youth career
- Viksjöfors IF FF
- 2004–2006: Edsbyns IF FF

Senior career*
Years	Team	Apps	(Gls)
2007–2011	Sundsvalls DFF		
2012–2016	Umeå IK	92	(34)
2017	KIF Örebro DFF	21	(1)
2018–2019	C.F. Florentia	17	(0)
2019–2020	Empoli	16	(3)
2020–2021	Napoli	22	(1)
2021–2025	Brescia	81	(9)

International career^{‡}
2013–	Sweden	14	(1)
- * Club domestic league appearances and goals as of 12 February 2023 ‡ National team caps and goals as of 00:10, 19 November 2018 (UTC)

Jenny Josefina Hjohlman (born 13 February 1990) is a Swedish footballer. She plays as a forward for the Sweden women's national football team.

== Club career ==
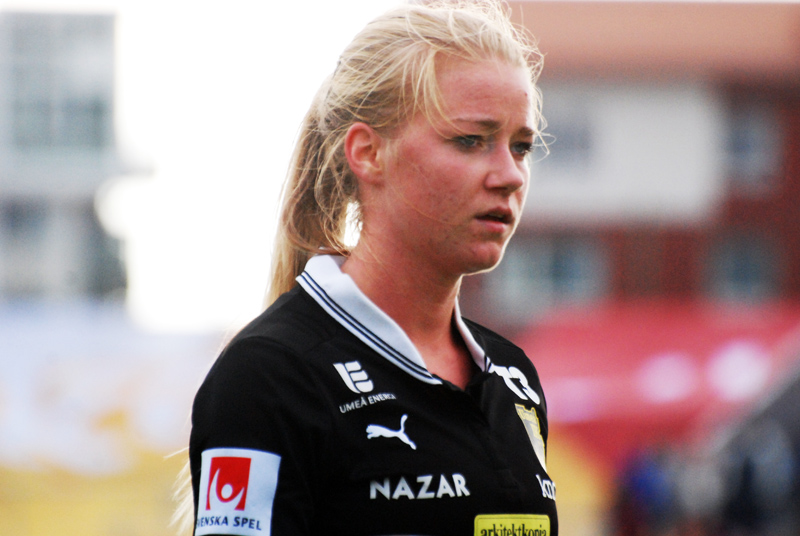
Hjohlman with Umeå IK in 2012

After five seasons with Sundsvalls DFF, Hjohlman joined Damallsvenskan team Umeå IK ahead of the 2012 season on a two-year contract. Upon Umeå's relegation in the 2016 season, Hjohlman transferred to KIF Örebro DFF on a one-year contract with an option for an extension.

== International career ==
Hjohlman made her debut for the senior Sweden team in a 4–1 win over England on 4 July 2013.

Coach Pia Sundhage named Hjohlman in the Sweden squad for UEFA Women's Euro 2013.
