= Rocío Ruiz =

Spanish footballer (born 1990)

Personal information
- Full name: Rocío Ruiz Molinero
- Date of birth: 18 April 1990 (age 36)
- Place of birth: Madrid, Spain
- Position: Defender

Senior career*
Years	Team	Apps	(Gls)
2005–2010	Atlético Madrid	48	(7)
2010–2012	Rayo Vallecano	1	(0)
- * Club domestic league appearances and goals as of 10:26, 31 August 2021 (UTC)

Rocío Ruiz Molinero is a Spanish former footballer who played mostly as a defender.

== Club career ==
Ruiz progressed through the academy at Atlético Madrid and played as a defender. In 2010, while still at Atlético, she appeared in El Mundo's "Uno de Seis Millones" special feature. In 2012, following issues with her foot while playing for Rayo Vallecano, she retired from football at the age of 21. She stated her intention to go into coaching and to continue working within football. Her former club Atlético Madrid sent a message of support following the announcement of her retirement, citing her being part of their team that won promotion to the Primera División in 2006 as a career highlight.

== International career ==
As an under-19 international she played in the 2008 U-19 European Championship.
