= Sara Penzo =

Italian footballer

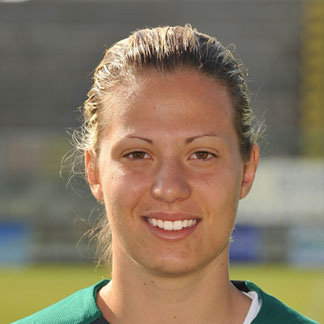

Personal information
- Full name: Sara Penzo
- Date of birth: 16 December 1989 (age 36)
- Place of birth: Chioggia, Italy
- Height: 1.75 m (5 ft 9 in)
- Position: Goalkeeper

Youth career
- Chioggia Sottomarina

Senior career*
Years	Team	Apps	(Gls)
2006–2007	Gordige	17	(0)
2007–2008	Torres Calcio Femminile	19	(0)
2008–2011	Venezia 1984	63	(0)
2011–2012	FC Basel Frauen		
2012–2013	ACF Brescia	30	(0)
2013–2017	UPC Tavagnacco		
2017–2018	Lazio		
2018–2019	Roma C.F.		

International career^{‡}
2010–2014	Italy	7	(0)
- * Club domestic league appearances and goals as of 15:42, 30 May 2015 (UTC) ‡ National team caps and goals as of 12:00, 1 July 2013 (UTC)

Sara Penzo (born 16 December 1989) is an Italian former football goalkeeper who played for women's Serie A club UPC Tavagnacco and the Italy women's national football team. In 2012, she signed for Serie A club ACF Brescia, following a season in the Swiss Nationalliga A playing for the women's section of FC Basel. She was part of the Italian squad at the 2009 and 2013 editions of the UEFA Women's Championship.

== International career ==
After helping Italy win the 2008 UEFA Women's Under-19 Championship, conceding one goal in four games, she was named in the squad for UEFA Women's Euro 2009 as an understudy to Anna Maria Picarelli.

Penzo made her senior debut for Italy in March 2010, in a 3–2 defeat by England at the 2010 Cyprus Cup.

National coach Antonio Cabrini named Penzo in his selection for UEFA Women's Euro 2013 in Sweden.
