= Cathrine Dyngvold =

Norwegian footballer (born 1989)

Personal information
- Full name: Cathrine Dyngvold
- Date of birth: 17 April 1989 (age 37)
- Place of birth: Kristiansand, Norway
- Height: 1.69 m (5 ft 6 1/2 in)
- Position: Forward

Youth career
- Just
- Bømlo
- Haugar

Senior career*
Years	Team	Apps	(Gls)
2008–2012	Klepp	88	(45)
2013–2015	Kopparbergs/Göteborg	16	(1)
2017–	Amazon Grimstad	72	(42)
- * Club domestic league appearances and goals as of 21:53, 20 July 2015 (UTC)

Cathrine Dyngvold (born 17 April 1989) is a Norwegian footballer who plays as a forward for 1. divisjon club Amazon Grimstad.

== Early life ==
Born and raised in Kristiansand, Dyngvold began playing football for local club, Just IL, as a youth. She began playing for Bømlo at age 12 and scored 42 goals in just over two seasons with the club. In 2003 at age 14, she captained the squad that clinched the Norway Cup scoring two goals during the final match. Starting at age 16, she played for Haugar for 1 1/2 years.

== Playing career ==
=== Club ===
==== Klepp IL ====
Dyngvold began playing for Klepp IL in the Toppserien, the top-level league in Norway, in 2008.

==== Göteborg FC ====
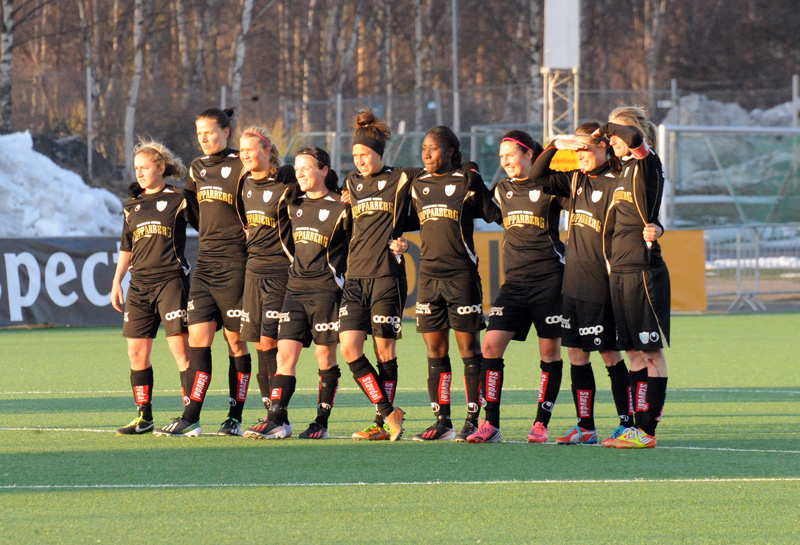
Dyngvold (third from left) prepares with her Göteborg FC teammates during penalty kicks in the 2013 Svenska Supercupen

In September 2012, Dyngvold signed a two-year contract with Swedish side, Kopparbergs/Göteborg FC in the Damallsvenskan, the top division of women's soccer in Sweden. She made her debut for the club during the Svenska Supercupen (Swedish Super Cup), an annual cup played between the previous season's Damallsvenskan champion and the winners of the Svenska Cupen (Swedish Cup). Dyngvold was subbed in during the 110th minute after the match went into overtime in a 2–2 draw against Damallsvenskan champions, Tyresö FF. Göteborg won 4–2 during penalty kicks with Dyngvold scoring the deciding penalty.

Dyngvold made her regular season debut for Göteborg during a 1–1 draw against Linköping FC on 17 April 2013. She scored her first goal on 13 June in a 5–1 victory over Mallbackens IF.

== Honors and awards ==
=== Team ===
- Winner, Swedish Super Cup Women, 2013
