= Lena Wermelt =

German footballer

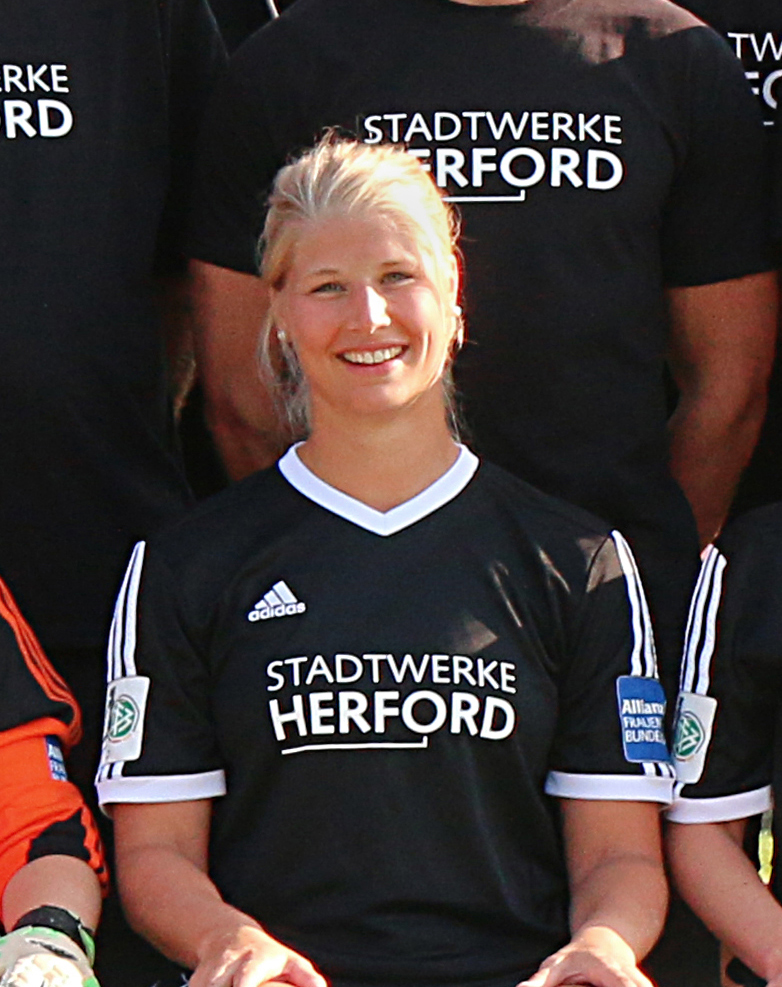

Personal information
- Full name: Lena Wermelt
- Date of birth: 29 September 1990 (age 36)
- Place of birth: Steinfurt, West Germany
- Height: 1.80 m (5 ft 11 in)
- Position: Defender

Team information
- Current team: HSV Borussia Friedenstal
- Number: 29

Youth career
- TuS Germania 1910 Horstmar
- –2006: SV Westfalia Leer

Senior career*
Years	Team	Apps	(Gls)
2006–2007	FFC Heike Rheine	19	(1)
2007–2009	SG Wattenscheid 09	42	(9)
2009–2010	FCR 2001 Duisburg	5	(1)
2010–	HSV Borussia Friedenstal	33	(12)

International career
	Germany U-15	?	(?)
	Germany U-17	?	(?)
–2009	Germany U-19	10	(4)
–2010	Germany U-20	4	(0)
- * Club domestic league appearances and goals

Lena Wermelt (born 29 September 1990 in Steinfurt) is a German footballer, playing for HSV Borussia Friedenstal in the Fußball-Bundesliga (women).

== Early life ==
Wermelt grew up on a farm and first played football with her neighbour. She first joined a football club at the age of six. In 2009, she was honoured as an elite sports student in Bochum.
