= Fanny Tenret =

French footballer

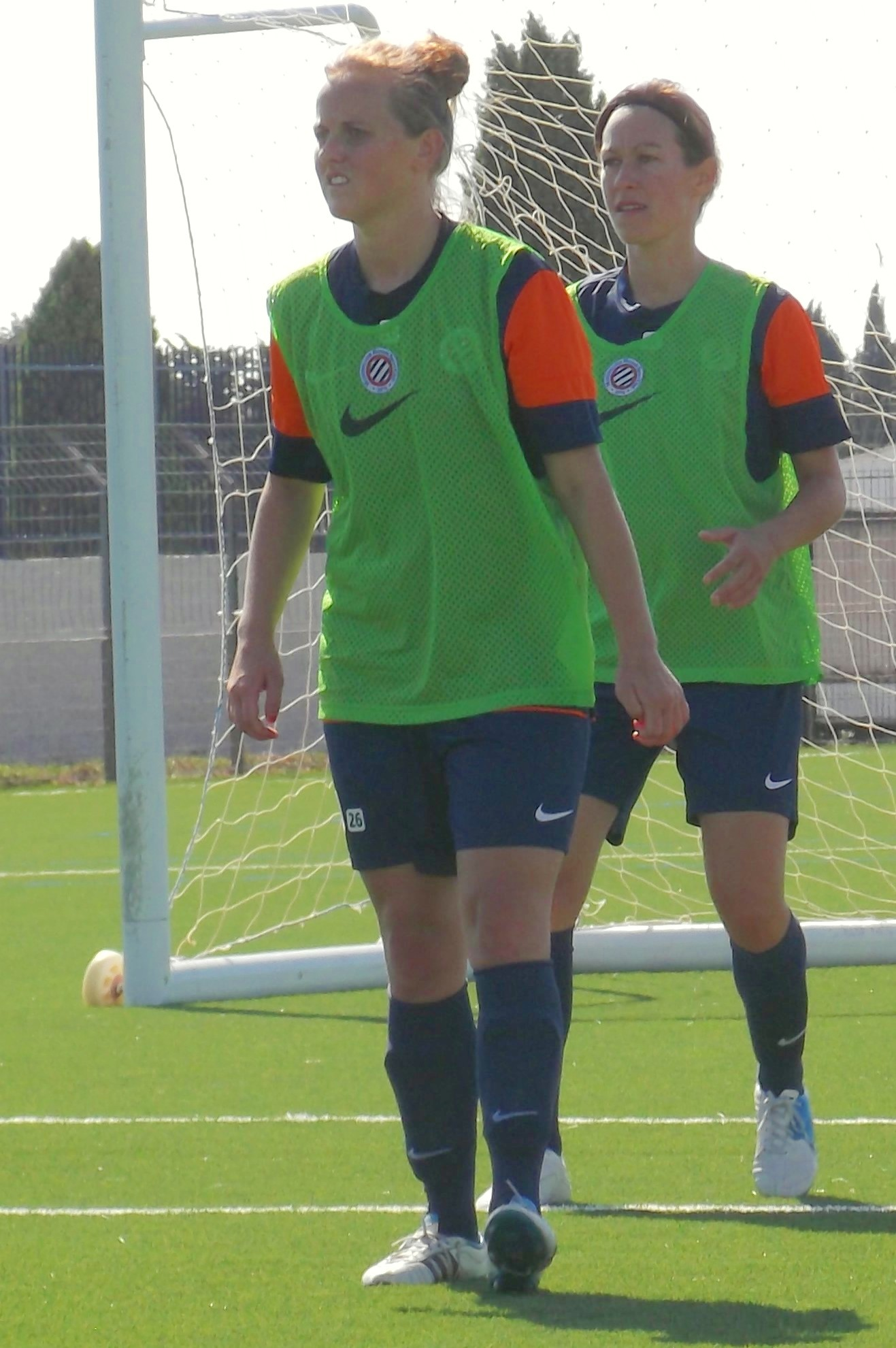
- Fanny Tenret, training with Montpellier HSC, in 2013.

Personal information
- Date of birth: 11 March 1990 (age 36)
- Place of birth: Sète, France
- Height: 1.69 m (5 ft 7 in)
- Position: Forward

Fanny Tenret (born 11 March 1990) is a French footballer who played Toulouse FC in the Seconde Ligue.

== International career ==
Tenret has played for France at youth level at the 2008 FIFA U-20 Women's World Cup.
