= Michela Rodella =

Italian footballer

Personal information
- Date of birth: 8 January 1989 (age 37)
- Place of birth: Rovigo, Italy
- Height: 1.62 m (5 ft 4 in)
- Position: Defender

Michela Rodella (born 8 January 1989) is a retired Italian footballer who played as a defender for Verona and the Italian national team.
