= Selina Wagner =

German footballer (born 1990)

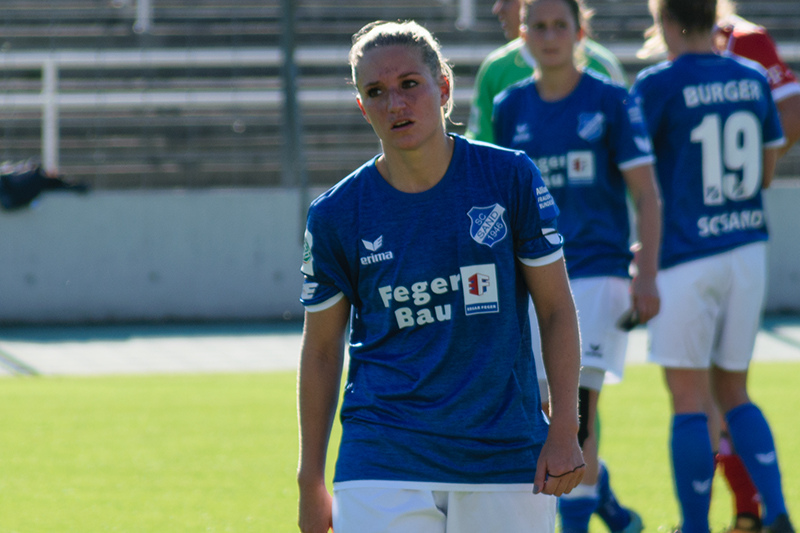
- Wagner in 2017

Personal information
- Full name: Selina Anna Wagner
- Date of birth: 6 October 1990 (age 36)
- Place of birth: St. Wendel, Germany
- Height: 1.68 m (5 ft 6 in)
- Position: Midfielder

Team information
- Current team: SC Sand
- Number: 31

Youth career
- SG St. Wendel
- Sportfreunde Winterbach
- 1. FC Saarbrücken

Senior career*
Years	Team	Apps	(Gls)
2007–2008	1. FC Saarbrücken	22	(3)
2009–2015	VfL Wolfsburg	59	(19)
2014	VfL Wolfsburg II	3	(1)
2015–2017	SC Freiburg	34	(3)
2017–	SC Sand	10	(0)

International career
2007	Germany U-17	5	(2)
2007–2009	Germany U-19	11	(3)
2009–2010	Germany U-20	12	(1)
2010	Germany U-23	1	(0)
- * Club domestic league appearances and goals as of 4 July 2018(UTC)

Selina Anna Wagner (born 6 October 1990) is a German footballer. She plays as a midfielder for SC Sand in the Bundesliga.

== Early life ==
Wagner was born in Sankt Wendel to parents hailing from Sankt Wendel and nearby Winterbach.

== Club career ==
Selina Wagner began her career at 1. FC Saarbrücken before joining VfL Wolfsburg in 2009. During the 2012–2013 season, she played an important role in their winning Champions League campaign, scoring in the second leg of the semi-final against Arsenal. That same season, Wolfsburg also won the DFB-Pokal and the Bundesliga, completing the treble. In 2015, she moved to SC Freiburg.

== International career ==
On 29 September 2007 she made her debut in the U-19 national team in the match against Macedonia.

On 1 August 2010, Wagner came on as an 88th-minute substitute in the final of the U-20 Women's World Cup in Germany, beating Nigeria 2–0.

== Honours ==
=== Club ===
VfL Wolfsburg

- UEFA Women's Champions League: 2012–13, 2013–14
- Bundesliga: 2012–13, 2013–14
- DFB-Pokal: 2012–13, 2014–15

=== International ===
- FIFA U-20 Women's World Cup: 2010

== Modelling ==
At the time of the 2011 FIFA Women's World Cup, the German July/August issue of Playboy featured a photoshoot of Selina Wagner with teammates Annika Doppler, Ivana Rudelic, Julia Simic and Kristina Gessat.
