= Stefanie Mirlach =

German footballer

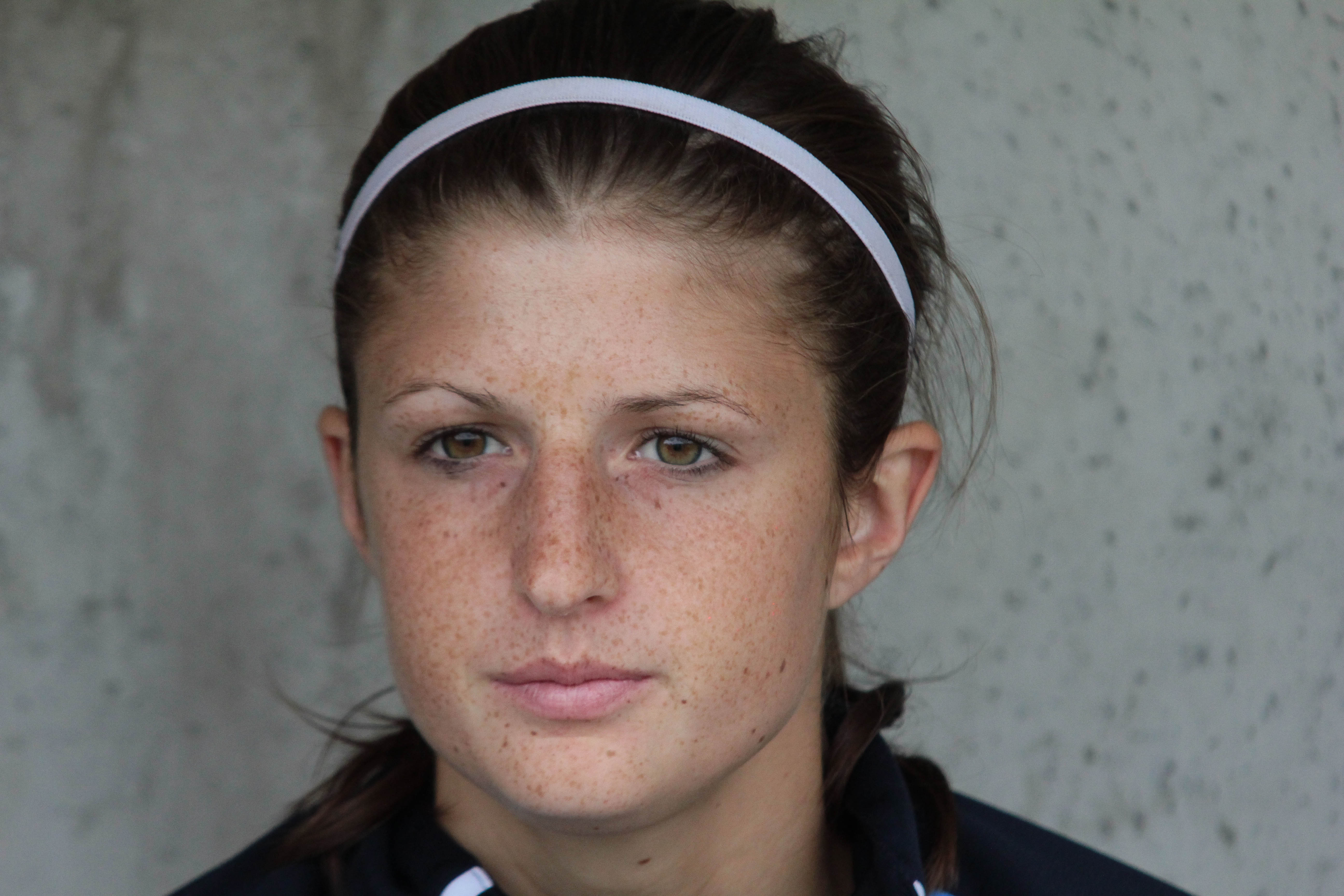

Personal information
- Date of birth: 18 April 1990 (age 36)
- Place of birth: Ingolstadt, West Germany
- Position: Midfielder

Team information
- Current team: Turbine Potsdam
- Number: 20

Senior career*
| Years | Team | Apps | (Gls) |
| 2006–2012 | Bayern Munich | 85 | (18) |
| 2012–2014 | Turbine Potsdam | | |
- * Club domestic league appearances and goals

Stefanie Mirlach is a retired German football midfielder. She last played for Turbine Potsdam in the Bundesliga. As an Under-19 international she won the 2010 U-20 World Cup.

== 1. FFC Turbine Potsdam ==
On 10 May 2012, it was announced that Mirlach will join German Bundesliga side 1. FFC Turbine Potsdam effective from 1 July 2012.
