= Cantabrian Coast =

Natural region in Northern Spain

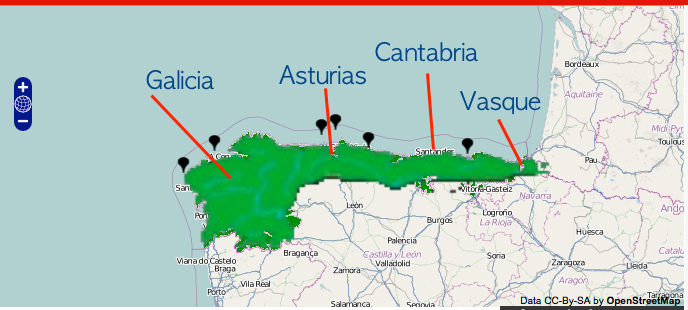
Green Spain location map

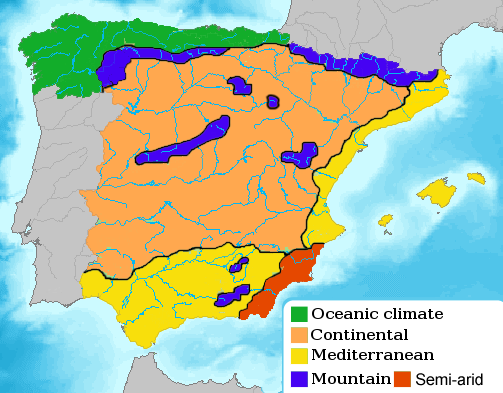
Spanish climatic areas, so-called 'Green Spain' is in the northernmost part

The Cantabrian Coast, often also Green Spain (Spanish: España Verde), is a lush natural region in Northern Spain, stretching along the Atlantic coast from the border with Portugal to the border with France. The region includes nearly all of Galicia, Asturias, and Cantabria, in addition to the northern parts of the Basque Country, as well as a small portion of Navarre.

== Climate and landscape ==
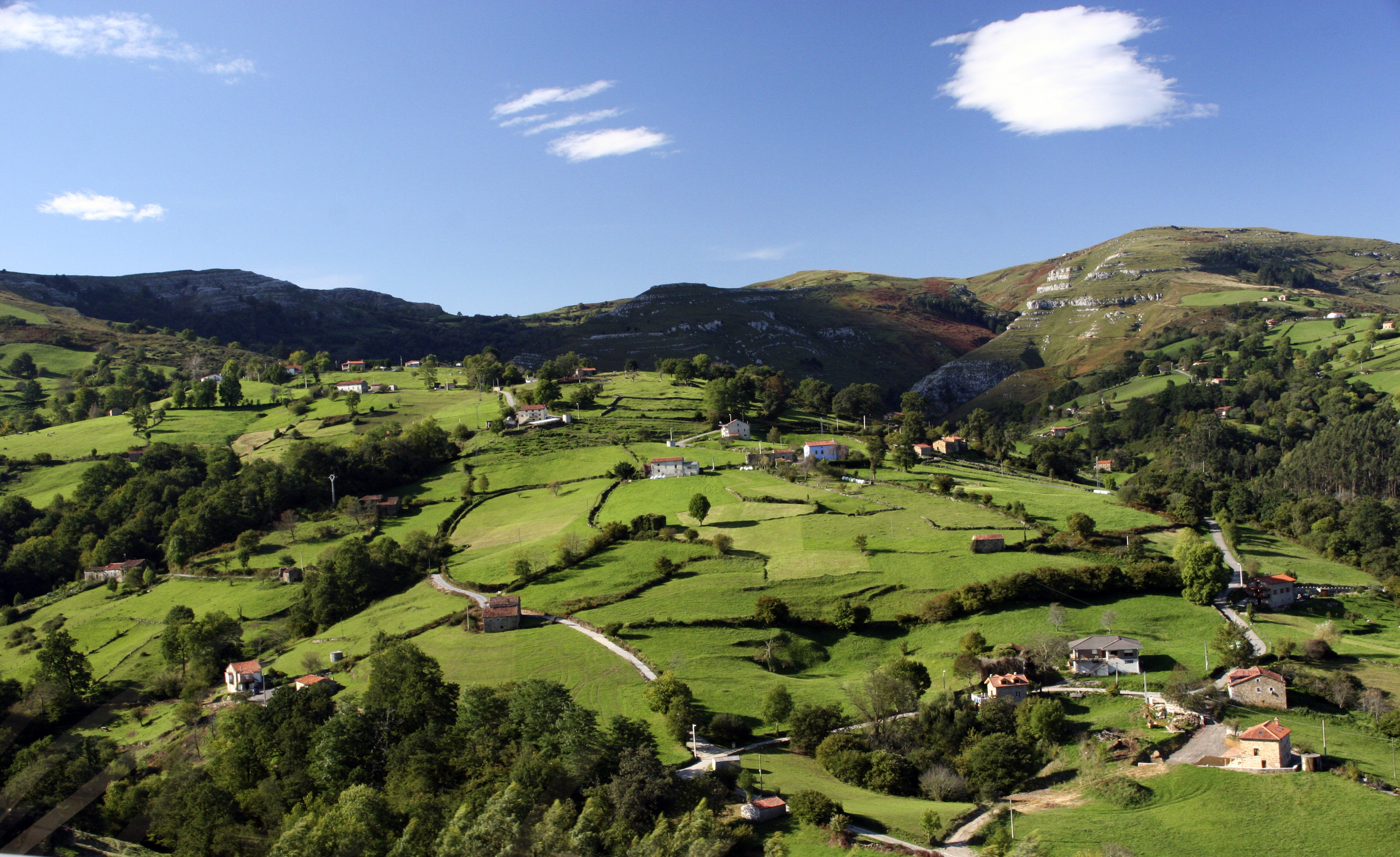
Mowing meadows in Cantabria. On the Cantabrian coast, dispersed settlements predominate.

Its wet and temperate oceanic climate helps lush pastures and forests thrive, providing a landscape similar to that of Ireland, Great Britain, and the west coast of France. The denomination of "Green Spain" has been made a territorial brand (in 1989) by the autonomous communities of Galicia, the Principality of Asturias, Cantabria and the Basque Country, with the support of Turespaña, whose objective is to position the Cantabrian coast as an alternative tourist destination in the international market.

The climate and landscape are determined by the Atlantic Ocean winds whose moisture gets trapped by the mountains circumventing the Spanish Atlantic façade.

Because of the Foehn effect, the southern slopes fall inside the rain shadow zone and so Green Spain contrasts starkly with the drier central plateau of Spain. Conversely, in those brief episodes when the southwestern winds blow through the mountains (especially during October and November), the effect reverses: the northern coast gets inside the Foehn winds and is dry and much warmer than the inner plateau, where rain is present.

The average precipitation is about 1,200 millimetres (47 in), higher than in most areas in inland central Europe, and wetter than almost anywhere in Spain, a country generally considered dry (the main exception to this northernly rainfall trend is the Sierra de Grazalema, in the southern province of Cádiz, with mountains that block the Atlantic moisture-carrying winds and which is, indeed, the rainiest place in Spain). Asturias has an average summer temperature of 20-22 °C, being one of the mildest climates in Europe.

Most of the rain comes from the Atlantic through Galicia, the western part of Green Spain. Depending on the latitude of entry, this wet air can drop to the south, or more likely stay and run through the north stretch of land, pushed north by the Cantabrian mountains.

== Native species ==
The main native tree species of this biome are beech and oak. However, since the second half of the 20th century, in some areas (especially in coastal areas), native forests have been replaced by plantations of eucalyptus and Monterey pine for its commercial exploitation in the paper industry.

The Pyrenees, which sometimes are considered in the same geologic system as the Cantabrian Mountains, were once included in Green Spain, even though the rainfall there has different patterns and the general landscape is more alpine rather than genuinely oceanic.

== Image gallery ==
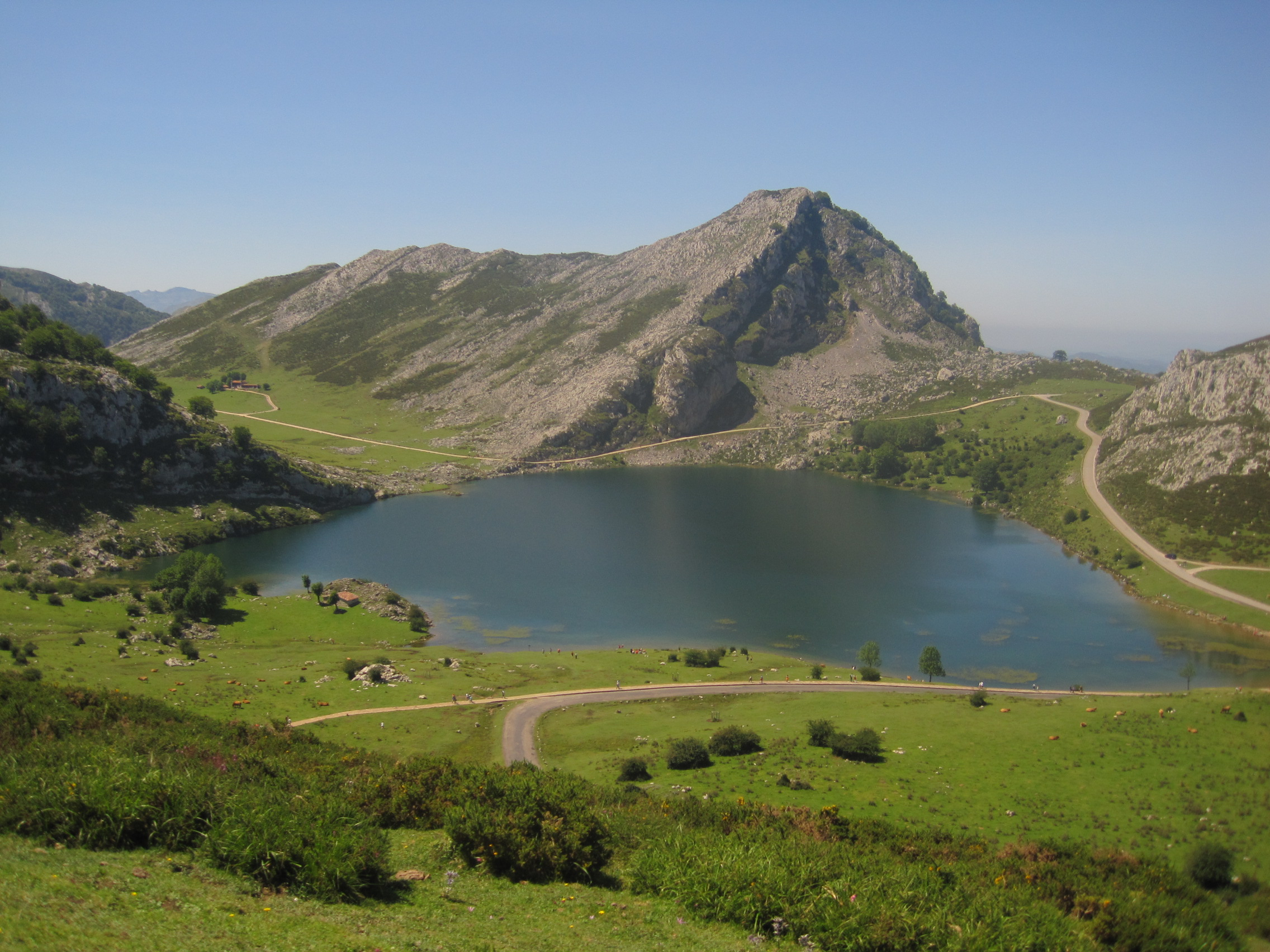
Lake Enol, Picos de Europa National Park, Picos de Europa, Asturias.

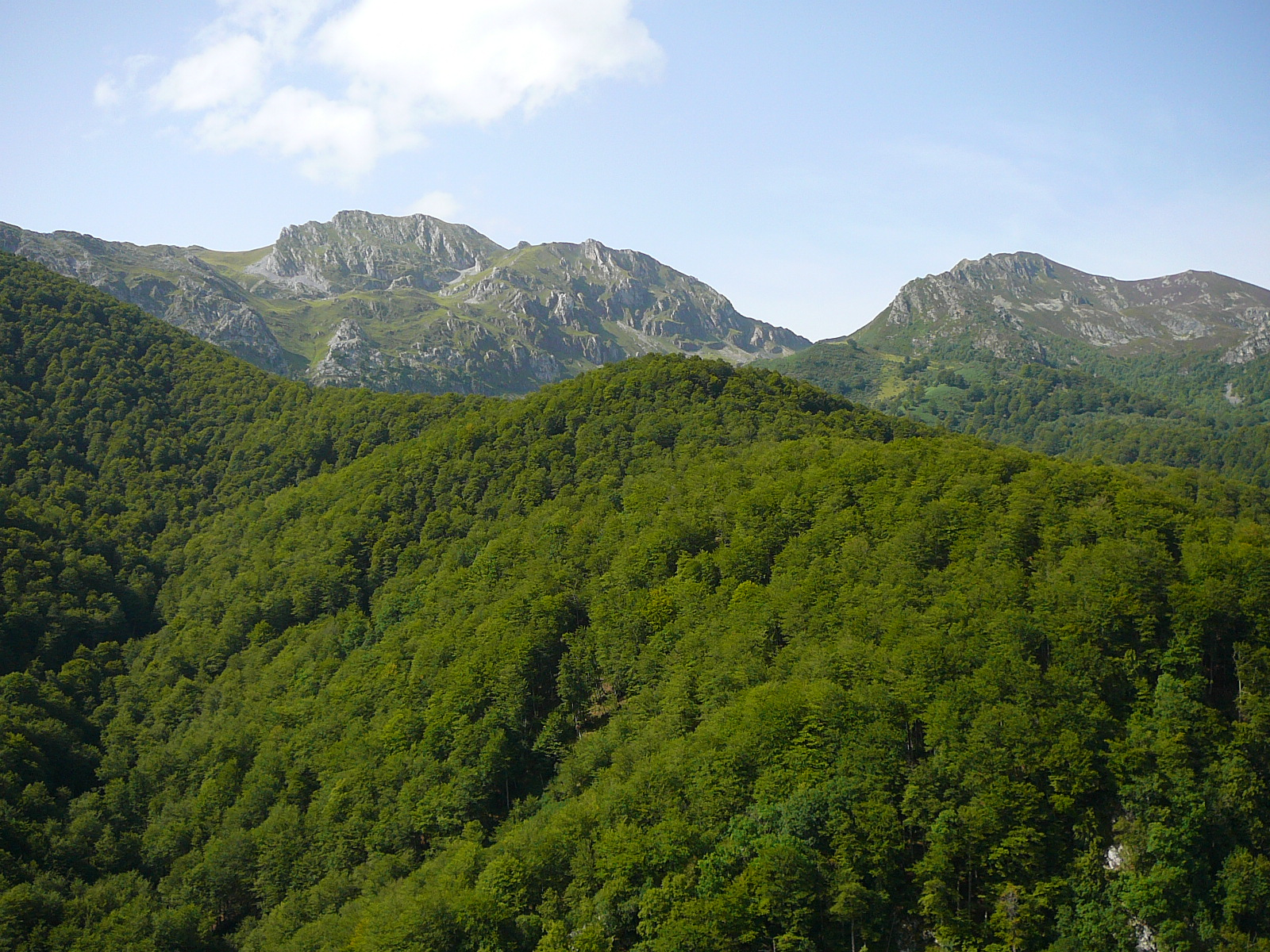
Redes Natural Park, Asturias.

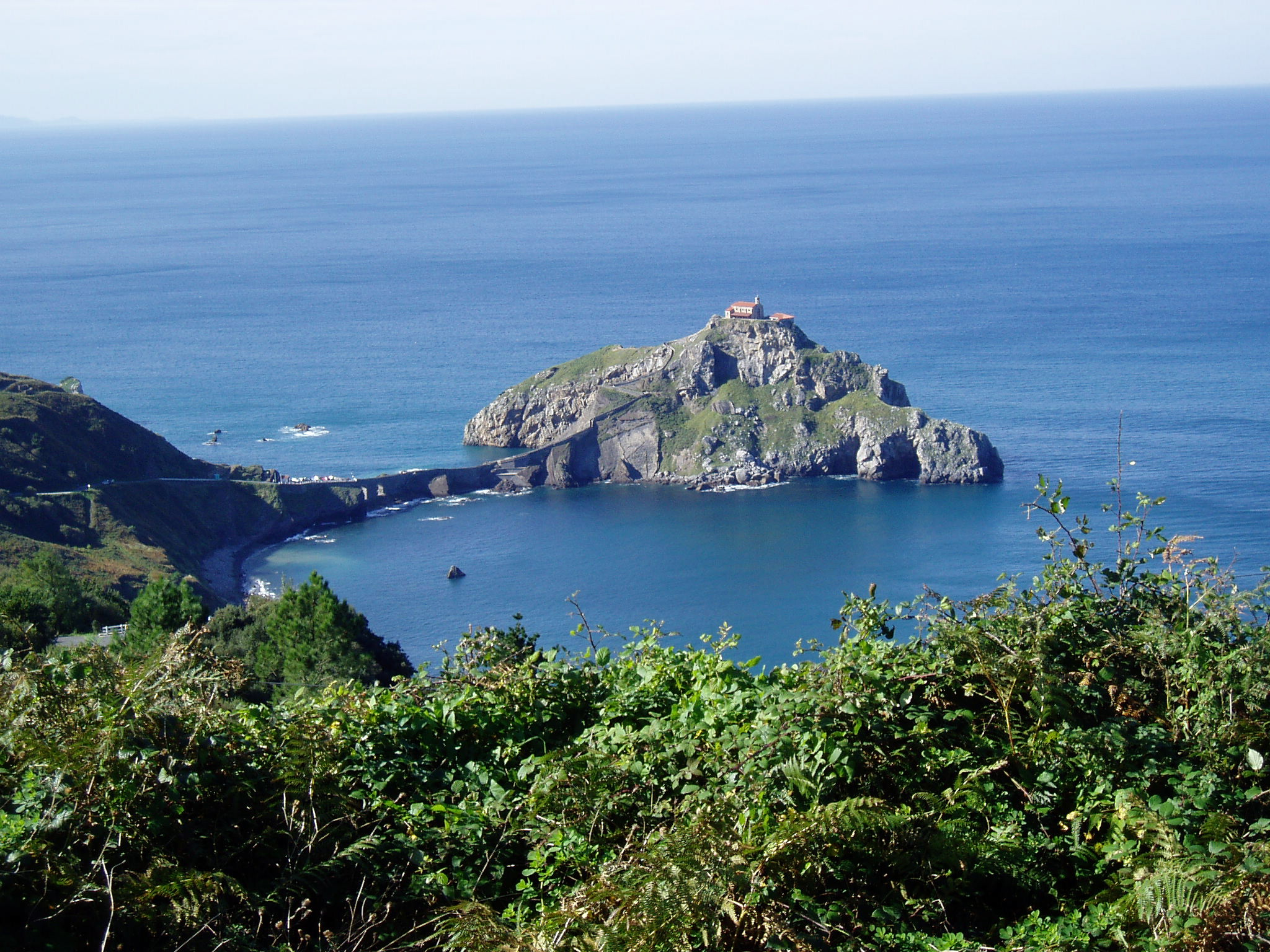
Basque coast.

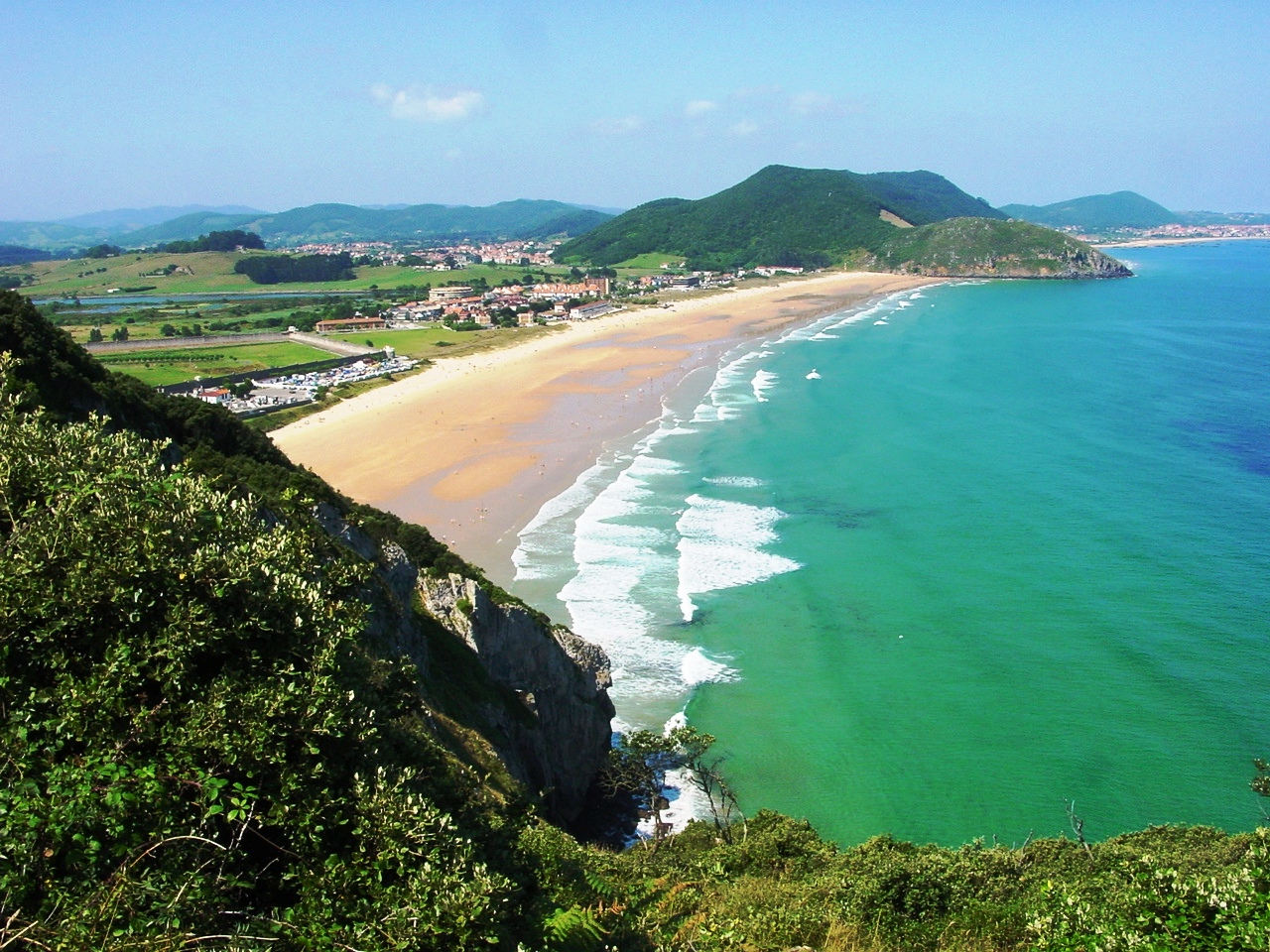
Coast of Cantabria.

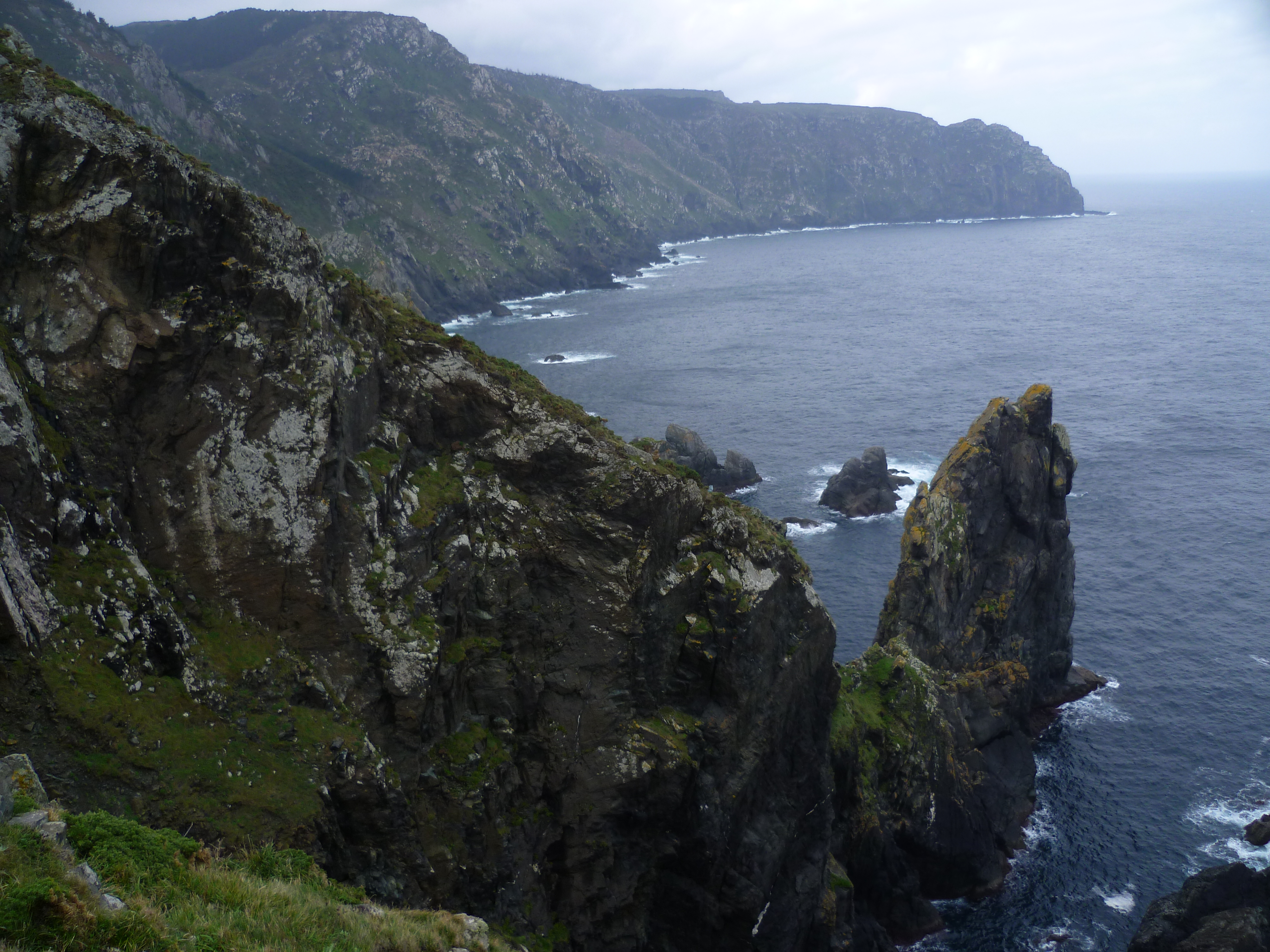
Coast of Galicia.

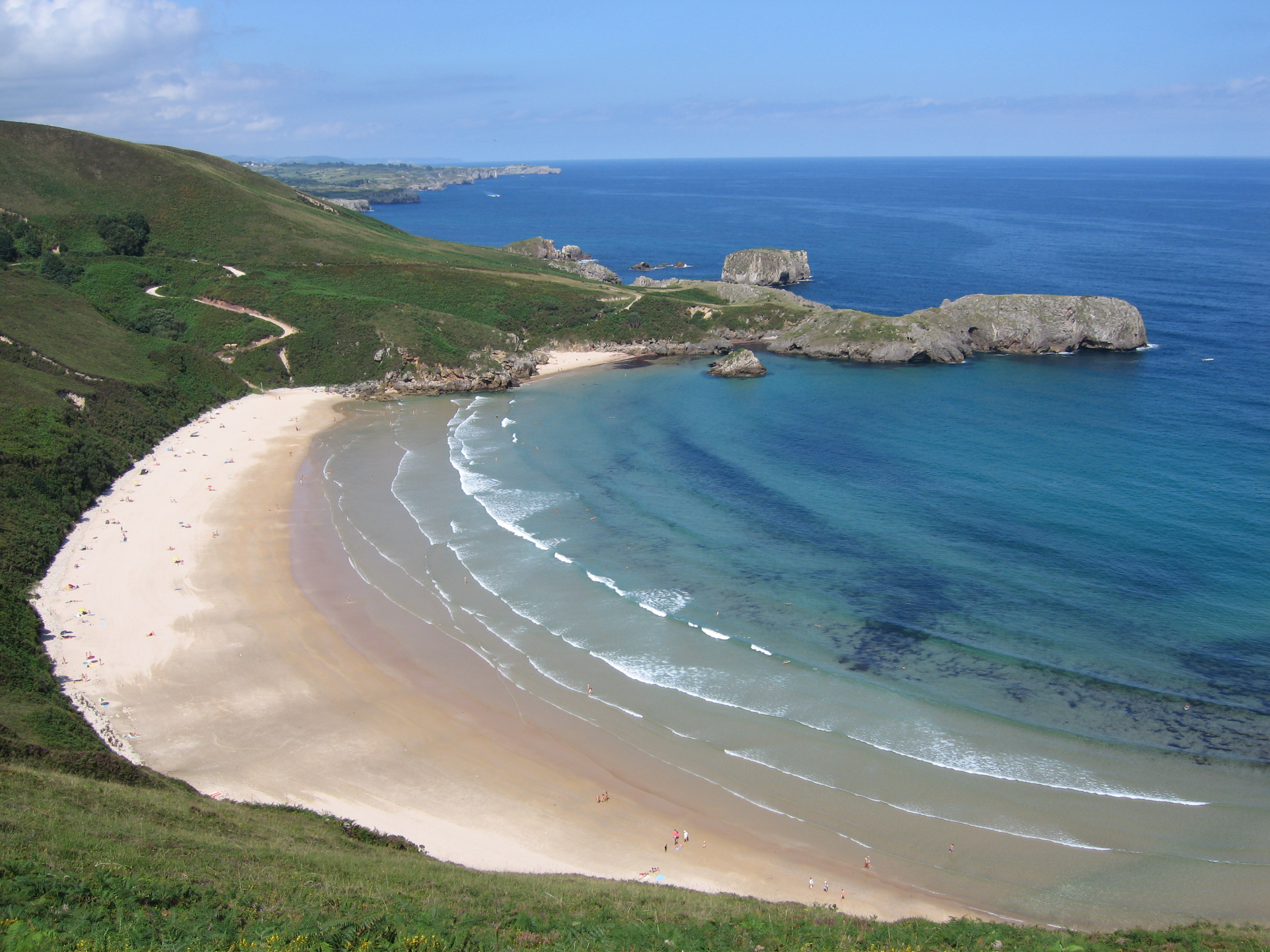
Coast of Asturias.

== See also ==
- Cantabrian mixed forests
- Climate of Spain
- The Eurosiberian region of the Iberian Peninsula
- Temperate broadleaf and mixed forests biome
