= 2003 in Japanese football =

2003 season

Japanese football in 2003

== National team (Men) ==
=== Results ===
2003.03.28	Japan	2–2	Uruguay	Tokyo, Japan
	Nakamura 23'; Inamoto 57'	JFA	? (?) ? (?)	Stadium: Tokyo National Stadium; Attendance: 54,039

2003.04.16	Japan	1–0	South Korea	Seoul, South Korea
	Nagai 90'	JFA		Attendance: 64,703

2003.05.31	Japan	0–1	South Korea	Tokyo, Japan
		JFA	? (?)	Stadium: Tokyo National Stadium; Attendance: 53,405

2003.06.08	Japan	1–4	Argentina	Osaka, Japan
	Akita 54'	JFA	? (?) ? (?) ? (?) ? (?)	Stadium: Osaka Nagai Stadium; Attendance: 45,313

2003.06.11	Japan	0–0	Paraguay	Saitama, Japan
		JFA		Stadium: Saitama Stadium 2002; Attendance: 59,891

2003.06.18	Japan	3–0	New Zealand	Saint-Denis, France
	Nakamura 12', 75'; H. Nakata 65'	JFA		Attendance: 36,038

2003.06.20	Japan	1–2	France	Saint-Étienne, France
	Nakamura 59'	JFA	? (?) ? (?)	Attendance: 33,070

2003.06.22	Japan	0–1	Colombia	Saint-Étienne, France
		JFA	? (?)	Attendance: 24,541

2003.08.20	Japan	3–0	Nigeria	Tokyo, Japan
	Takahara 1', 39'; Endō 72'	JFA		Stadium: Tokyo National Stadium; Attendance: 54,660

2003.09.10	Japan	0–1	Senegal	Niigata, Japan
		JFA	? (?)	Stadium: Niigata Stadium; Attendance: 40,014

2003.10.08	Japan	1–0	Tunisia	Tunis, Tunisia
	Yanagisawa 39'	JFA

2003.10.11	Japan	1–1	Romania	Bucharest, Romania
	Yanagisawa 58'	JFA	? (?)

2003.11.19	Japan	0–0	Cameroon	Ōita, Japan
		JFA		Stadium: Ōita Stadium; Attendance: 38,627

2003.12.04	Japan	2–0	China PR	Tokyo, Japan
	Kubo 4', 80'	JFA		Stadium: Tokyo National Stadium; Attendance: 41,742

2003.12.07	Japan	1–0	Hong Kong	Saitama, Japan
	Santos 37'	JFA		Stadium: Saitama Stadium 2002; Attendance: 45,145

2003.12.10	Japan	0–0	South Korea	Kanagawa, Japan
		JFA		Stadium: International Stadium Yokohama; Attendance: 62,633

=== Players statistics ===
Player	-2002	03.28	04.16	05.31	06.08	06.11	06.18	06.20	06.22	08.20	09.10	10.08	10.11	11.19	12.04	12.07	12.10	2003	Total
Yoshikatsu Kawaguchi	52(0)	O	-	-	-	-	-	-	-	-	-	-	O	-	-	-	-	2(0)	54(0)
Masashi Nakayama	50(21)	-	O	O	O	-	-	-	-	-	-	-	-	-	-	-	-	3(0)	53(21)
Hidetoshi Nakata	48(9)	O	-	-	O	O	O(1)	O	O	O	O	O	O	O	-	-	-	11(1)	59(10)
Yutaka Akita	40(3)	O	O	O	O(1)	-	-	-	-	-	-	-	-	-	-	-	-	4(1)	44(4)
Toshihiro Hattori	40(2)	O	O	O	O	-	-	-	-	-	-	-	-	-	-	-	-	4(0)	44(2)
Junichi Inamoto	35(3)	O(1)	-	O	O	-	O	O	-	O	O	O	O	O	-	-	-	10(1)	45(4)
Akira Narahashi	34(0)	O	O	O	O	-	-	-	-	-	-	-	-	-	-	-	-	4(0)	38(0)
Ryuzo Morioka	34(0)	O	O	O	O	-	-	-	-	-	-	-	-	-	-	-	-	4(0)	38(0)
Koji Nakata	33(0)	O	O	O	O	O	-	O	O	-	-	-	-	-	-	-	-	7(0)	40(0)
Shinji Ono	32(3)	O	-	-	-	-	-	-	-	-	O	O	O	O	-	-	-	5(0)	37(3)
Atsushi Yanagisawa	31(9)	-	-	-	-	-	-	-	-	O	O	O(1)	O(1)	O	-	-	-	5(2)	36(11)
Seigo Narazaki	25(0)	-	O	O	O	O	O	O	O	-	-	O	-	O	O	O	O	12(0)	37(0)
Shunsuke Nakamura	23(5)	O(1)	-	-	-	O	O(2)	O(1)	-	O	O	O	O	-	-	-	-	8(4)	31(9)
Takayuki Suzuki	23(4)	O	-	O	O	-	-	-	-	-	-	O	-	-	-	-	-	4(0)	27(4)
Daisuke Oku	22(2)	-	O	-	-	-	-	-	O	-	-	-	-	-	-	O	-	3(0)	25(2)
Naohiro Takahara	19(9)	O	-	-	-	O	O	O	O	O(2)	-	-	O	O	-	-	-	8(2)	27(11)
Atsuhiro Miura	16(1)	-	-	-	-	-	-	-	-	-	-	O	-	-	-	-	-	1(0)	17(1)
Tsuneyasu Miyamoto	16(0)	-	-	-	-	O	O	O	O	O	O	-	-	O	O	O	O	10(0)	26(0)
Takashi Fukunishi	15(0)	-	O	-	O	O	-	-	-	-	-	-	-	-	O	O	O	6(0)	21(0)
Tatsuhiko Kubo	14(0)	-	-	-	-	-	-	-	-	-	-	-	-	-	O(2)	O	O	3(2)	17(2)
Yuji Nakazawa	10(2)	-	-	-	-	-	-	-	-	-	-	O	O	-	O	-	O	4(0)	14(2)
Toshiya Fujita	10(2)	-	-	-	-	-	-	-	-	-	-	O	-	O	-	-	O	3(0)	13(2)
Alessandro Santos	9(1)	O	O	O	O	O	O	O	O	O	O	-	O	O	O	O(1)	O	15(1)	24(2)
Mitsuo Ogasawara	8(0)	-	O	O	O	-	-	O	O	-	-	-	-	-	O	O	O	8(0)	16(0)
Masashi Motoyama	3(0)	-	-	-	-	-	-	-	-	-	O	-	-	-	O	-	O	3(0)	6(0)
Hitoshi Sogahata	2(0)	-	-	-	-	-	-	-	-	O	O	-	-	-	-	-	-	2(0)	4(0)
Yoshiteru Yamashita	2(0)	-	O	-	-	-	-	-	-	-	-	-	-	-	-	-	-	1(0)	3(0)
Yasuhito Endō	1(0)	-	-	O	-	O	O	O	O	O(1)	O	-	-	O	O	O	O	11(1)	12(1)
Nobuhisa Yamada	1(0)	-	-	-	-	O	O	O	O	O	O	-	O	O	O	O	O	11(0)	12(0)
Yoshito Ōkubo	0(0)	-	-	O	O	O	O	O	O	O	O	O	O	O	O	O	O	14(0)	14(0)
Keisuke Tsuboi	0(0)	-	-	-	-	O	O	O	O	O	O	-	O	O	O	O	O	11(0)	11(0)
Yuichiro Nagai	0(0)	-	O(1)	O	O	-	-	-	O	-	-	-	-	-	-	-	-	4(1)	4(1)
Teruaki Kurobe	0(0)	O	-	-	-	-	-	-	-	-	O	-	-	-	-	-	O	3(0)	3(0)
Teruyuki Moniwa	0(0)	-	-	-	-	-	-	-	-	-	-	O	-	-	-	O	-	2(0)	2(0)
Daisuke Matsui	0(0)	-	-	-	-	-	-	-	O	-	-	-	-	-	-	-	-	1(0)	1(0)
Akira Kaji	0(0)	-	-	-	-	-	-	-	-	-	-	O	-	-	-	-	-	1(0)	1(0)
Takuya Yamada	0(0)	-	-	-	-	-	-	-	-	-	-	-	-	-	-	O	-	1(0)	1(0)
Naohiro Ishikawa	0(0)	-	-	-	-	-	-	-	-	-	-	-	-	-	-	O	-	1(0)	1(0)

== National team (Women) ==
=== Results ===
2003.01.12	Japan	0–0	United States	United States

2003.03.19	Japan	9–0	Thailand	Thailand
	Yamagishi (?); Arakawa (?); Ono (?); Suzuki (?); Ando (?); Maruyama (?)

2003.06.09	Japan	15–0	Philippines	Thailand
	Otani (?); Arakawa (?); Kobayashi (?); Miyazaki (?); Sawa (?); Miyamoto (?); Miyama (?); Sakai (?)

2003.06.11	Japan	7–0	Guam	Thailand
	Sakai (?); Sawa (?); Maruyama (?); Yano (?); Arakawa (?)

2003.06.13	Japan	7–0	Myanmar	Thailand
	Otani (?); Kobayashi (?); Sawa (?); Isozaki (?); Maruyama (?)

2003.06.15	Japan	5–0	Chinese Taipei	Thailand
	Sawa (?); Kobayashi (?); Maruyama (?) (?)

2003.06.19	Japan	0–3	North Korea	Thailand
			? (?) ? (?) ? (?)

2003.06.21	Japan	0–1	South Korea	Thailand
			? (?)

2003.07.05	Japan	2–2	Mexico	Mexico
	Kobayashi (?); Miyamoto (?)		? (?) ? (?)

2003.07.12	Japan	2–0	Mexico	Tokyo, Japan
	Sawa (?); Maruyama (?)			Stadium: National Stadium

2003.07.22	Japan	5–0	South Korea	Miyagi, Japan
	Otani (?); Miyamoto (?); Arakawa (?); Miyama (?)			Stadium: Sendai Stadium

2003.07.27	Japan	0–0	Australia	Miyagi, Japan
				Stadium: Sendai Stadium

2003.09.21	Japan	6–0	Argentina	United States
	Otani (?); Yamamoto (?); Sawa (?)

2003.09.25	Japan	0–3	Germany	United States
			? (?) ? (?) ? (?)

2003.09.27	Japan	1–3	Canada	United States
	Sawa (?)		? (?) ? (?) ? (?)

=== Players statistics ===
Player	-2002	01.12	03.19	06.09	06.11	06.13	06.15	06.19	06.21	07.05	07.12	07.22	07.27	09.21	09.25	09.27	2003	Total
Homare Sawa	70(37)	O	-	O(1)	O(2)	O(1)	O(2)	O	O	O	O(1)	-	-	O(2)	O	O(1)	12(10)	82(47)
Yumi Obe	66(6)	O	O	O	O	O	O	O	O	O	O	O	O	O	O	O	15(0)	81(6)
Nozomi Yamago	46(0)	O	O	O	O	O	O	O	O	O	O	O	O	O	O	O	15(0)	61(0)
Hiromi Isozaki	44(3)	-	O	O	-	O(1)	-	O	O	O	O	O	-	O	O	O	11(1)	55(4)
Tomoe Sakai	43(0)	O	O	O(1)	O(1)	O	O	O	-	O	O	O	O	O	O	O	14(2)	57(2)
Tomomi Miyamoto	37(6)	-	O	O(1)	O	O	O	O	O	O(1)	O	O(1)	O	O	O	O	14(3)	51(9)
Yasuyo Yamagishi	36(5)	O	O(1)	-	O	O	O	O	O	-	-	O	O	O	O	O	12(1)	48(6)
Yayoi Kobayashi	32(5)	O	-	O(2)	O	O(2)	O(1)	O	O	O(1)	O	O	O	O	O	O	14(6)	46(11)
Mio Otani	26(11)	O	O	O(7)	-	O(2)	O	O	O	O	O	O(1)	O	O(3)	O	O	14(13)	40(24)
Miyuki Yanagita	24(3)	-	-	-	-	-	-	-	-	-	-	-	O	-	O	O	3(0)	27(3)
Mai Nakachi	24(0)	O	-	-	O	-	O	O	-	-	-	O	-	-	-	-	5(0)	29(0)
Naoko Kawakami	20(0)	O	O	O	O	O	O	-	O	O	O	O	O	O	O	O	14(0)	34(0)
Shiho Onodera	18(0)	-	O	-	-	-	-	-	-	-	-	O	-	-	-	-	2(0)	20(0)
Kozue Ando	11(0)	-	O(2)	-	-	-	-	-	-	-	-	-	-	-	-	-	1(2)	12(2)
Yuka Miyazaki	10(1)	O	O	O(1)	-	O	-	-	-	-	-	O	O	-	-	-	6(1)	16(2)
Karina Maruyama	5(0)	O	O(1)	O	O(2)	O(1)	O(1)	O	O	-	O(1)	O	O	O	-	-	12(6)	17(6)
Eriko Arakawa	2(0)	-	O(1)	O(1)	O(1)	O	O	O	O	-	O	O(2)	O	O	O	O	13(5)	15(5)
Miho Fukumoto	1(0)	-	O	-	-	-	-	-	-	-	-	-	-	-	-	-	1(0)	2(0)
Emi Yamamoto	0(0)	O	O	O	-	O	O	O	O	O	O	O	O	O(1)	O	O	14(1)	14(1)
Kyoko Yano	0(0)	-	-	-	O(1)	-	O	-	O	O	O	O	O	O	O	-	9(1)	9(1)
Aya Miyama	0(0)	-	O	O(1)	O	-	-	O	-	-	-	O(1)	-	-	-	O	6(2)	6(2)
Shinobu Ono	0(0)	O	O(2)	-	O	-	-	-	O	O	-	-	-	-	-	-	5(2)	5(2)
Tomoko Suzuki	0(0)	O	O(2)	-	-	-	-	-	-	-	-	-	-	-	-	-	2(2)	2(2)
Akiko Sudo	0(0)	O	O	-	-	-	-	-	-	-	-	-	-	-	-	-	2(0)	2(0)
Hiroko Sano	0(0)	-	O	-	-	-	-	-	-	-	-	-	-	-	-	-	1(0)	1(0)
Akiko Niwata	0(0)	-	O	-	-	-	-	-	-	-	-	-	-	-	-	-	1(0)	1(0)
Eriko Sato	0(0)	-	-	-	-	-	-	-	-	-	-	-	O	-	-	-	1(0)	1(0)

== Births ==
- 30 April: Kuryu Matsuki
