= 2007 in Japanese football =

2007 season

Japanese football in 2007

== J.League Division 1 ==
| Pos | Team | Pld | W | D | L | GF | GA | GD | Pts | Qualification or relegation |
|---|---|---|---|---|---|---|---|---|---|---|
| 1 | Kashima Antlers (C) | 34 | 22 | 6 | 6 | 60 | 36 | +24 | 72 | 2008 AFC Champions League Group Stage |
| 2 | Urawa Red Diamonds | 34 | 20 | 10 | 4 | 55 | 28 | +27 | 70 | 2008 AFC Champions League Knockout Stage |
| 3 | Gamba Osaka | 34 | 19 | 10 | 5 | 71 | 37 | +34 | 67 | 2008 AFC Champions League Group Stage (Note: Urawa Red Diamonds won the 2006 Emperor's Cup and have already qualified for AFC Champions League. Since Urawa takes the extra spot as the defending 2007 ACL champion; therefore Gamba Osaka received the third ACL spot as the third place team of the league.) (Note: Gamba Osaka qualifies to Pan-Pacific Championship as the Nabisco Cup winner.) |
| 4 | Shimizu S-Pulse | 34 | 18 | 7 | 9 | 53 | 36 | +17 | 61 | |
| 5 | Kawasaki Frontale | 34 | 14 | 12 | 8 | 66 | 48 | +18 | 54 | |
| 6 | Albirex Niigata | 34 | 15 | 6 | 13 | 48 | 47 | +1 | 51 | |
| 7 | Yokohama F. Marinos | 34 | 14 | 8 | 12 | 54 | 35 | +19 | 50 | |
| 8 | Kashiwa Reysol | 34 | 14 | 8 | 12 | 43 | 36 | +7 | 50 | |
| 9 | Júbilo Iwata | 34 | 15 | 4 | 15 | 54 | 55 | −1 | 49 | |
| 10 | Vissel Kobe | 34 | 13 | 8 | 13 | 58 | 48 | +10 | 47 | |
| 11 | Nagoya Grampus Eight | 34 | 13 | 6 | 15 | 43 | 45 | −2 | 45 | |
| 12 | FC Tokyo | 34 | 14 | 3 | 17 | 49 | 58 | −9 | 45 | |
| 13 | JEF United Chiba | 34 | 12 | 6 | 16 | 51 | 56 | −5 | 42 | |
| 14 | Oita Trinita | 34 | 12 | 5 | 17 | 42 | 60 | −18 | 41 | |
| 15 | Omiya Ardija | 34 | 8 | 11 | 15 | 24 | 40 | −16 | 35 | |
| 16 | Sanfrecce Hiroshima (R) | 34 | 8 | 8 | 18 | 44 | 71 | −27 | 32 | 2007 promotion/relegation Series |
| 17 | Ventforet Kofu (R) | 34 | 7 | 6 | 21 | 33 | 65 | −32 | 27 | Relegation to 2008 J.League Division 2 |
| 18 | Yokohama FC (R) | 34 | 4 | 4 | 26 | 19 | 66 | −47 | 16 | Relegation to 2008 J.League Division 2 |

Updated to match(es) played on December 1, 2007. Source: J. League Division 1
Rules for classification: 1) points; 2) goal difference; 3) number of goals scored.
(C) Champions; (R) Relegated

== J.League Division 2 ==
| Pos | Team | Pld | W | D | L | GF | GA | GD | Pts | Promotion |
|---|---|---|---|---|---|---|---|---|---|---|
| 1 | Consadole Sapporo (C, P) | 48 | 27 | 10 | 11 | 66 | 45 | +21 | 91 | Promotion to 2008 J. League Division 1 |
| 2 | Tokyo Verdy 1969 (P) | 48 | 26 | 11 | 11 | 90 | 57 | +33 | 89 | Promotion to 2008 J. League Division 1 |
| 3 | Kyoto Sanga (P) | 48 | 24 | 14 | 10 | 80 | 59 | +21 | 86 | 2007 promotion/relegation Series |
| 4 | Vegalta Sendai | 48 | 24 | 11 | 13 | 72 | 54 | +18 | 83 | |
| 5 | Cerezo Osaka | 48 | 24 | 8 | 16 | 72 | 55 | +17 | 80 | |
| 6 | Shonan Bellmare | 48 | 23 | 8 | 17 | 72 | 55 | +17 | 77 | |
| 7 | Avispa Fukuoka | 48 | 22 | 7 | 19 | 77 | 61 | +16 | 73 | |
| 8 | Sagan Tosu | 48 | 21 | 9 | 18 | 63 | 66 | −3 | 72 | |
| 9 | Montedio Yamagata | 48 | 15 | 13 | 20 | 46 | 56 | −10 | 58 | |
| 10 | Ehime FC | 48 | 12 | 9 | 27 | 39 | 66 | −27 | 45 | |
| 11 | Thespa Kusatsu | 48 | 7 | 21 | 20 | 42 | 71 | −29 | 42 | |
| 12 | Mito HollyHock | 48 | 8 | 10 | 30 | 32 | 70 | −38 | 34 | |
| 13 | Tokushima Vortis | 48 | 6 | 15 | 27 | 31 | 67 | −36 | 33 | |

Updated to match(es) played on December 1, 2007. Source: J. League Division 2
Rules for classification: 1) points; 2) goal difference; 3) number of goals scored.
(C) Champions; (P) Promoted

== Japan Football League ==
| Pos | Team | Pld | W | D | L | GF | GA | GD | Pts | Promotion or relegation |
|---|---|---|---|---|---|---|---|---|---|---|
| 1 | Sagawa Express (Note: Occupied the top place at the end of the first half of the season (17th week) and was automatically qualified for 2007 Emperor's Cup, while each of other JFL clubs had to go through the prefectural qualifier.) (C) | 34 | 26 | 5 | 3 | 81 | 31 | +50 | 83 | |
| 3 | Rosso Kumamoto (Note: J. League Associate Membership) (P) | 34 | 21 | 6 | 7 | 65 | 34 | +31 | 69 | Promotion to 2008 J. League Division 2 (Note: Must hold J. League Associate Membership, finish no less than in fourth place and pass a final inspection by J. League to be promoted.) |
| 3 | FC Gifu (P) | 34 | 17 | 9 | 8 | 45 | 31 | +14 | 60 | Promotion to 2008 J. League Division 2 |
| 4 | ALO's Hokuriku | 34 | 16 | 11 | 7 | 50 | 35 | +15 | 59 | |
| 5 | Honda FC | 34 | 16 | 10 | 8 | 61 | 42 | +19 | 58 | |
| 6 | YKK AP | 34 | 16 | 7 | 11 | 60 | 53 | +7 | 55 | |
| 7 | Yokogawa Musashino | 34 | 16 | 6 | 12 | 50 | 44 | +6 | 54 | |
| 8 | Tochigi SC | 34 | 14 | 10 | 10 | 43 | 29 | +14 | 52 | |
| 9 | JEF Reserves | 34 | 14 | 10 | 10 | 50 | 45 | +5 | 52 | |
| 10 | Ryutsu Keizai University | 34 | 15 | 5 | 14 | 58 | 49 | +9 | 50 | |
| 11 | Sony Sendai | 34 | 13 | 5 | 16 | 46 | 59 | −13 | 44 | |
| 12 | SP Kyoto | 34 | 13 | 4 | 17 | 45 | 57 | −12 | 43 | |
| 13 | TDK SC | 34 | 11 | 9 | 14 | 49 | 47 | +2 | 42 | |
| 14 | Gainare Tottori | 34 | 10 | 9 | 15 | 42 | 51 | −9 | 39 | |
| 15 | Mitsubishi Motors Mizushima | 34 | 11 | 2 | 21 | 36 | 53 | −17 | 35 | |
| 16 | FC Kariya | 34 | 8 | 4 | 22 | 36 | 59 | −23 | 28 | |
| 17 | FC Ryukyu | 34 | 7 | 6 | 21 | 38 | 82 | −44 | 27 | |
| 18 | Arte Takasaki | 34 | 1 | 4 | 29 | 17 | 71 | −54 | 7 | |

Updated to match(es) played on December 2, 2007. Source: Japan Football League
Rules for classification: 1) points; 2) goal difference; 3) number of goals scored.
(C) Champions; (P) Promoted

== National team (Men) ==
=== Results ===
| 2007.03.24 | Japan | 2–0 | Peru | Kanagawa, Japan |
| | Maki 19'; Takahara 54' | JFA | | Stadium: International Stadium Yokohama; Attendance: 60,400 |

| 2007.06.01 | Japan | 2–0 | Montenegro | Shizuoka, Japan |
| | Nakazawa 23'; Takahara 38' | JFA | | Stadium: Shizuoka Stadium; Attendance: 28,635 |

| 2007.06.05 | Japan | 0–0 | Colombia | Saitama, Japan |
| | | JFA | | Stadium: Saitama Stadium 2002; Attendance: 45,091 |

| 2007.07.09 | Japan | 1–1 | Qatar | Hanoi, Vietnam |
| | Takahara 60' | JFA | ? (?) | Attendance: 5,000 |

| 2007.07.13 | Japan | 3–1 | United Arab Emirates | Hanoi, Vietnam |
| | Takahara 22', 27'; S. Nakamura 42' | JFA | ? (?) | Attendance: 5,000 |

| 2007.07.16 | Japan | 4–1 | Vietnam | Hanoi, Vietnam |
| | Maki 12', 59'; Endō 31'; S. Nakamura 52' | JFA | ? (?) | Attendance: 40,000 |

| 2007.07.21 | Japan | 1–1 (a.e.t.) (4–3 p) | Australia | Hanoi, Vietnam |
| | Takahara 72' | JFA | ? (?) | Attendance: 25,000 |

| 2007.07.25 | Japan | 2–3 | Saudi Arabia | Hanoi, Vietnam |
| | Nakazawa 37'; Abe 53' | JFA | ? (?) ? (?) ? (?) | Attendance: 10,000 |

| 2007.07.28 | Japan | 0–0 (a.e.t.) (5–6 p) | South Korea | Palembang, Indonesia |
| | | JFA | | Attendance: 10,000 |

| 2007.08.22 | Japan | 2–0 | Cameroon | Ōita, Japan |
| | Tulio 25'; Yamase 89' | JFA | | Stadium: Ōita Stadium; Attendance: 37,240 |

| 2007.09.07 | Japan | 0–0 (3–4 p) | Austria | Klagenfurt, Austria |
| | | JFA | | Attendance: 26,142 |

| 2007.09.11 | Japan | 4–3 | Switzerland | Klagenfurt, Austria |
| | S. Nakamura 53', 78'; Maki 68'; Yano 90' | JFA | ? (?) ? (?) ? (?) | Attendance: 19,500 |

| 2007.10.17 | Japan | 4–1 | Egypt | Osaka, Japan |
| | Ōkubo 21', 42'; Maeda 53'; Kaji 68' | JFA | ? (?) | Stadium: Osaka Nagai Stadium; Attendance: 41,901 |

=== Players statistics ===
| Player | -2006 | 03.24 | 06.01 | 06.05 | 07.09 | 07.13 | 07.16 | 07.21 | 07.25 | 07.28 | 08.22 | 09.07 | 09.11 | 10.17 | 2007 | Total |
| Yoshikatsu Kawaguchi | 98(0) | O | - | O | O | O | O | O | O | O | O | O | O | O | 12(0) | 110(0) |
| Junichi Inamoto | 65(4) | - | - | O | - | - | - | - | - | - | - | O | O | - | 3(0) | 68(4) |
| Shunsuke Nakamura | 63(16) | O | - | O | O | O(1) | O(1) | O | O | O | - | O | O(2) | - | 10(4) | 73(20) |
| Kōji Nakata | 56(2) | - | - | O | - | - | - | - | - | - | - | - | - | - | 1(0) | 57(2) |
| Yuji Nakazawa | 53(9) | O | O(1) | O | O | O | O | O | O(1) | O | O | O | O | O | 13(2) | 66(11) |
| Seigo Narazaki | 50(0) | - | O | - | - | - | - | - | - | - | - | - | - | - | 1(0) | 51(0) |
| Akira Kaji | 49(1) | O | - | - | O | O | O | O | O | O | O | O | O | O(1) | 11(1) | 60(2) |
| Naohiro Takahara | 44(17) | O(1) | O(1) | O | O(1) | O(2) | O | O(1) | O | O | - | - | - | - | 9(6) | 53(23) |
| Yasuhito Endō | 44(3) | O | O | O | O | O | O(1) | O | O | O | O | O | O | O | 13(1) | 57(4) |
| Keisuke Tsuboi | 39(0) | - | O | - | - | - | - | - | - | - | - | - | - | - | 1(0) | 40(0) |
| Yoshito Ōkubo | 19(0) | - | - | - | - | - | - | - | - | - | O | - | - | O(2) | 2(2) | 21(2) |
| Seiichiro Maki | 17(3) | O(1) | O | O | - | O | O(2) | O | O | - | - | O | O(1) | - | 9(4) | 26(7) |
| Yūichi Komano | 15(0) | O | O | O | - | O | O | O | O | O | O | O | O | O | 12(0) | 27(0) |
| Yuki Abe | 13(1) | O | O | O | O | O | O | O | O(1) | O | O | - | - | O | 11(1) | 24(2) |
| Hisato Satō | 12(3) | - | O | - | - | - | O | O | O | O | O | - | O | - | 7(0) | 19(3) |
| Keita Suzuki | 7(0) | O | O | O | O | O | O | O | O | O | O | O | O | O | 13(0) | 20(0) |
| Tatsuya Tanaka | 6(1) | - | - | - | - | - | - | - | - | - | O | O | - | - | 2(0) | 8(1) |
| Yasuyuki Konno | 6(0) | - | O | O | O | O | - | O | - | - | O | O | - | O | 8(0) | 14(0) |
| Marcus Tulio Tanaka | 5(1) | O | - | - | - | - | - | - | - | - | O(1) | O | O | - | 4(1) | 9(2) |
| Naotake Hanyu | 5(0) | O | - | O | O | O | O | - | O | O | - | - | - | - | 7(0) | 12(0) |
| Daisuke Matsui | 4(1) | - | - | - | - | - | - | - | - | - | - | O | O | - | 2(0) | 6(1) |
| Kengo Nakamura | 3(1) | O | O | O | O | O | O | O | O | O | O | O | O | O | 13(0) | 16(1) |
| Satoru Yamagishi | 3(0) | - | O | - | O | - | - | - | - | O | - | - | O | O | 5(0) | 8(0) |
| Ryūji Bando | 2(2) | - | - | O | - | - | - | - | - | - | - | - | - | - | 1(0) | 3(2) |
| Koji Yamase | 1(0) | - | - | - | - | - | - | - | - | - | O(1) | - | - | - | 1(1) | 2(1) |
| Daiki Takamatsu | 1(0) | - | - | - | - | - | - | - | - | - | O | - | - | - | 1(0) | 2(0) |
| Kisho Yano | 0(0) | O | O | - | - | - | - | O | O | O | - | O | O(1) | - | 7(1) | 7(1) |
| Jungo Fujimoto | 0(0) | O | O | O | - | - | - | - | - | - | - | - | - | O | 4(0) | 4(0) |
| Koki Mizuno | 0(0) | O | O | - | - | O | O | - | - | - | - | - | - | - | 4(0) | 4(0) |
| Hideo Hashimoto | 0(0) | - | O | - | O | - | - | - | - | - | O | - | - | O | 4(0) | 4(0) |
| Ryoichi Maeda | 0(0) | - | - | - | - | - | - | - | - | - | O | - | - | O(1) | 2(1) | 2(1) |
| Akihiro Ienaga | 0(0) | O | - | - | - | - | - | - | - | - | - | - | - | - | 1(0) | 1(0) |

== National team (Women) ==
=== Results ===
| 2007.02.09 | Japan | 1–0 | Norway | Cyprus |
| | Ono (?) |

| 2007.02.12 | Japan | 2–2 | Sweden | Cyprus |
| | Miyama (?); Arakawa (?) | | ? (?) ? (?) |

| 2007.02.14 | Japan | 2–0 | Scotland | Cyprus |
| | Sakaguchi (?) |

| 2007.03.10 | Japan | 2–0 | Mexico | Tokyo, Japan |
| | Sawa (?); Miyama (?) | | | Stadium: National Stadium |

| 2007.03.17 | Japan | 1–2 | Mexico | Mexico |
| | Arakawa (?) | | ? (?) ? (?) |

| 2007.04.07 | Japan | 2–0 | Vietnam | Tokyo, Japan |
| | Sawa (?); Sakai (?) | | | Stadium: National Stadium |

| 2007.04.15 | Japan | 4–0 | Thailand | Thailand |
| | Sawa (?); Arakawa (?); Ono (?) |

| 2007.06.03 | Japan | 6–1 | South Korea | Tokyo, Japan |
| | Miyamoto (?); Ono (?); Arakawa (?) (?); Ito (?); Sawa (?) | | ? (?) | Stadium: National Stadium |

| 2007.06.10 | Japan | 2–2 | South Korea | South Korea |
| | Ono (?); Miyama (?) | | ? (?) ? (?) |

| 2007.07.28 | Japan | 1–4 | United States | United States |
| | Nagasato (?) | | ? (?) ? (?) ? (?) ? (?) |

| 2007.08.04 | Japan | 8–0 | Vietnam | Vietnam |
| | Sakai (?); Iwashimizu (?); Ono (?); Miyama (?); Miyamoto (?); Sawa (?); Nagasato (?) |

| 2007.08.12 | Japan | 5–0 | Thailand | Tokyo, Japan |
| | Ono (?); Nagasato (?); Yanagita (?); Sawa (?); Sakaguchi (?) | | | Stadium: National Stadium |

| 2007.08.30 | Japan | 0–0 | Canada | Tokyo, Japan |
| | | | | Stadium: National Stadium |

| 2007.09.02 | Japan | 2–1 | Brazil | Chiba, Japan |
| | Iwashimizu (?) (?) | | ? (?) | Stadium: Chiba Soga Football Stadium |

| 2007.09.11 | Japan | 2–2 | England | China |
| | Miyama (?) | | ? (?) ? (?) |

| 2007.09.14 | Japan | 1–0 | Argentina | China |
| | Nagasato (?) |

| 2007.09.17 | Japan | 0–2 | Germany | China |
| | | | ? (?) ? (?) |

=== Players statistics ===
| Player | -2006 | 02.09 | 02.12 | 02.14 | 03.10 | 03.17 | 04.07 | 04.15 | 06.03 | 06.10 | 07.28 | 08.04 | 08.12 | 08.30 | 09.02 | 09.11 | 09.14 | 09.17 | 2007 | Total |
| Homare Sawa | 116(59) | - | - | - | O(1) | O | O(1) | O(1) | O(1) | O | O | O(1) | O(1) | O | O | O | O | O | 14(6) | 130(65) |
| Tomoe Sakai | 93(5) | O | O | O | O | O | O(1) | O | O | O | O | O(1) | O | O | O | O | O | O | 17(2) | 110(7) |
| Hiromi Isozaki | 91(4) | O | O | - | O | O | O | O | O | O | O | O | O | O | O | O | O | O | 16(0) | 107(4) |
| Nozomi Yamago | 80(0) | - | - | O | - | - | - | - | - | O | - | - | O | - | - | - | - | - | 3(0) | 83(0) |
| Mio Otani | 66(31) | - | O | - | - | O | - | O | O | O | - | - | - | O | O | - | - | - | 7(0) | 73(31) |
| Miyuki Yanagita | 62(10) | O | O | - | O | O | O | O | O | O | O | O | O(1) | O | O | - | - | O | 14(1) | 76(11) |
| Tomomi Miyamoto | 61(11) | O | O | - | O | O | O | O | O(1) | O | O | O(1) | O | O | O | O | O | O | 16(2) | 77(13) |
| Kozue Ando | 43(7) | - | O | O | - | - | O | - | O | - | O | - | O | - | O | O | O | - | 9(0) | 52(7) |
| Karina Maruyama | 40(10) | - | - | O | - | - | - | - | - | - | - | - | - | - | - | - | - | - | 1(0) | 41(10) |
| Eriko Arakawa | 39(13) | O | O(1) | - | O | O(1) | O | O(1) | O(1) | O | O | O | - | O | O | O | O | O | 15(4) | 54(17) |
| Kyoko Yano | 35(1) | - | - | - | - | O | - | - | - | O | O | - | - | O | O | - | O | - | 6(0) | 41(1) |
| Aya Miyama | 33(9) | O | O(1) | O | O(1) | O | O | O | O | O(1) | O | O(1) | O | O | O | O(2) | O | O | 17(6) | 50(15) |
| Shinobu Ono | 29(10) | O(1) | O | O | O | O | O | O(2) | O(1) | O(1) | O | O(2) | O(1) | O | O | O | O | O | 17(8) | 46(18) |
| Ayumi Hara | 29(1) | - | - | - | - | - | - | - | - | - | - | O | O | - | O | O | - | O | 5(0) | 34(1) |
| Aya Shimokozuru | 26(0) | - | - | O | - | - | - | - | - | - | - | - | - | - | - | - | - | - | 1(0) | 27(0) |
| Yuki Nagasato | 23(15) | O | O | O | O | - | - | - | - | - | O(1) | O(1) | O(1) | O | O | O | O(1) | O | 12(4) | 35(19) |
| Miho Fukumoto | 19(0) | O | O | - | O | O | O | O | O | - | O | O | - | O | O | O | O | O | 14(0) | 33(0) |
| Maiko Nakaoka | 13(0) | - | - | O | - | - | - | - | - | - | - | - | - | - | - | - | - | - | 1(0) | 14(0) |
| Azusa Iwashimizu | 10(3) | O | O | - | O | O | - | - | - | O | O | O(1) | O | O | O(1) | O | O | O | 13(2) | 23(5) |
| Kanako Ito | 9(2) | - | - | - | - | - | - | - | O(1) | - | - | - | - | - | - | - | - | - | 1(1) | 10(3) |
| Mizuho Sakaguchi | 7(10) | - | - | O(2) | - | - | O | O | - | - | O | - | O(1) | - | - | - | - | - | 5(3) | 12(13) |
| Rumi Utsugi | 7(0) | O | - | - | O | O | O | O | - | - | - | - | - | - | O | O | O | O | 9(0) | 16(0) |
| Ayako Kitamoto | 6(3) | - | - | O | - | - | - | - | - | - | - | - | - | - | - | - | - | - | 1(0) | 7(3) |
| Nayuha Toyoda | 5(0) | - | O | O | - | - | O | O | O | - | O | O | O | - | - | - | - | - | 8(0) | 13(0) |
| Yukari Kinga | 3(0) | O | O | O | O | O | O | O | O | O | O | O | - | O | O | O | O | O | 16(0) | 19(0) |
| Mami Yamaguchi | 0(0) | - | - | - | - | - | - | - | - | - | O | - | - | - | - | - | - | - | 1(0) | 1(0) |

== Deaths ==
- 21 February: Arawa Kimura (born 1931)
