= Emi Yamamoto =

Japanese footballer (born 1982)

Emi Yamamoto 山本 絵美
Personal information
- Full name: Emi Yamamoto
- Date of birth: 9 March 1982 (age 44)
- Place of birth: Miura, Kanagawa, Japan
- Height: 1.57 m (5 ft 2 in)
- Position: Midfielder

Team information
- Current team: Chifure AS Elfen Saitama
- Number: 7

Youth career
- 1997–1999: Shonan Women's High School

Senior career*
Years	Team	Apps	(Gls)
2000–2008	Tasaki Perule FC	145	(62)
2014–2020	Yokohama FC Seagulls	52+	(6+)
2021-	Chifure AS Elfen Saitama	0	(0)
Total		197+	(68+)

International career
2003–2004	Japan	22	(4)
Medal record
Tasaki Perule FC
Winner	Nadeshiko League	2003
Runner-up	Nadeshiko League	2001
Runner-up	Nadeshiko League	2002
Runner-up	Nadeshiko League	2005
Runner-up	Nadeshiko League	2007
Winner	Empress's Cup	2002
Winner	Empress's Cup	2003
Winner	Empress's Cup	2006
Runner-up	Empress's Cup	2000
Runner-up	Empress's Cup	2001
Runner-up	Empress's Cup	2005
Runner-up	Empress's Cup	2007
- * Club domestic league appearances and goals

Emi Yamamoto (山本 絵美, Yamamoto Emi; born 9 March 1982) is a Japanese football player. She plays for Chifure AS Elfen Saitama. She has also played for the Japan national team.

== Club career ==
Yamamoto was born in Miura on 9 March 1982. After graduating from high school, she joined Tasaki Perule FC in 2000. She was selected Best Young Player awards in the 2000 season. The club won L.League championship in 2003 and 2nd position 4 times. However, the club was disbanded in 2008 due to financial strain. From 2009, she went to the United States and Italy. In 2014, she returned to Japan and joined Yokohama FC Seagulls (later NHK Spring Yokohama FC Seagulls).

== National team career ==
On 12 January 2003, Yamamoto debuted in the Japan national team against the United States. She played at the 2003 AFC Championship. She was also a team member for Japan at the 2003 World Cup and 2004 Summer Olympics. She played 22 games and scored 4 goals for Japan until 2004.

== National team statistics ==
Japan national team
Year	Apps	Goals
2003	14	1
2004	8	3
Total	22	4

== International goals ==
No.	Date	Venue	Opponent	Score	Result	Competition
1.	20 September 2003	Columbus Crew Stadium, Columbus, United States	Argentina	3–0	6–0	2003 FIFA Women's World Cup
2.	20 August 2004	Kaftanzoglio Stadium, Thessaloniki, Greece	United States	1–1	1–2	2004 Summer Olympics
