= 1999 in Japanese football =

1999 season

Japanese football in 1999

== J.League Division 1 ==
Pos	Team	Pld	W	OTW	D	OTL	L	GF	GA	GD	Pts	Qualification or relegation
1/2	Shimizu S-Pulse	30	20	2	1	1	6	56	36	+20	65	
1/2	Júbilo Iwata	30	14	3	1	3	9	52	42	+10	49	Champion and qualified to the Asian Club Championship 2000–01 Second Round
3	Kashiwa Reysol	30	17	3	1	1	8	49	36	+13	58	
4	Nagoya Grampus Eight	30	16	2	2	3	7	62	44	+18	54	Cup-Winner 1999 Emperor's Cup and qualified to the Asian Cup Winners' Cup 2000–01 Second Round
5	Yokohama F. Marinos	30	14	4	3	1	8	61	35	+26	53	
6	Cerezo Osaka	30	15	4	0	1	10	64	45	+19	53	
7	Verdy Kawasaki	30	13	4	2	2	9	43	43	0	49	
8	Sanfrecce Hiroshima	30	15	1	1	2	11	54	43	+11	48	
9	Kashima Antlers (Note: Champion from 1998 J.League)	30	11	3	1	4	11	53	37	+16	40	
10	Vissel Kobe	30	9	3	4	2	12	38	45	−7	37	
11	Gamba Osaka	30	9	2	1	2	16	36	46	−10	32	
12	Kyoto Purple Sanga	30	9	2	0	4	15	38	58	−20	31	
13	JEF United Ichihara	30	6	4	2	4	14	41	56	−15	28	
14	Avispa Fukuoka	30	7	3	1	1	18	41	59	−18	28	
15	Urawa Red Diamonds	30	7	1	5	7	10	39	58	−19	28	Relegated to the 2000 J.League Division 2
16	Bellmare Hiratsuka	30	4	0	1	3	22	30	72	−42	13	Relegated to the 2000 J.League Division 2

Source: J.League data site

== J.League Division 2 ==
Pos	Team	Pld	W	OTW	D	OTL	L	GF	GA	GD	Pts	Promotion
1	Kawasaki Frontale (C)	36	20	5	3	1	7	69	34	+35	73	Promoted to the 2000 J.League Division 1
2	FC Tokyo	36	19	2	3	2	10	51	35	+16	64	Promoted to the 2000 J.League Division 1
3	Oita Trinita	36	18	3	3	4	8	62	42	+20	63	
4	Albirex Niigata	36	16	4	2	1	13	46	40	+6	58	
5	Consadole Sapporo (Note: Relegated from 1998 J.League)	36	15	2	6	2	11	54	35	+19	55	
6	Omiya Ardija	36	14	4	1	2	15	47	44	+3	51	
7	Montedio Yamagata	36	14	1	4	4	13	47	53	−6	48	
8	Sagan Tosu	36	11	1	2	2	20	52	64	−12	37	
9	Vegalta Sendai	36	7	3	4	4	18	30	58	−28	31	
10	Ventforet Kofu	36	4	1	4	4	23	32	85	−53	18	

(C) Champion

== Japan Football League ==
Pos	Team	Pld	W	OTW	D	L	GF	GA	GD	Pts	Promotion
1	Yokohama FC (C)	24	16	2	3	3	57	32	+25	55	
2	Honda Motor (Note: Occupied one of the top three places at the end of the first part of the season (9th week) and were seeded for 1999 Emperor's Cup. These clubs were automatically qualified for the tournament, while each of other JFL clubs had to go through the prefectural qualifier. Yokohama F.C. and Kokushikan University were not eligible to be seeded.)	24	13	5	1	5	69	34	+35	50	
3	Mito HollyHock (P)	24	13	3	0	8	48	32	+16	45	Promotion to 2000 J. League Division 2 (Note: Though Mito HollyHock haven't finished within top two, their promotion was unanimously accepted by the special J. League Board decision. The fact that championship has been won by associate JFL members, Yokohama F.C., was taken into account.)
4	Denso SC	24	8	3	4	9	46	38	+8	34	
5	Sony Sendai	24	7	2	1	14	29	42	−13	26	
6	Otsuka Pharmaceuticals	24	7	1	2	14	35	47	−12	25	
7	Jatco SC	24	6	2	3	13	40	53	−13	25	
8	Yokogawa Electric	24	6	1	0	17	26	42	−16	20	
9	Kokushikan University	24	4	2	0	18	36	65	−29	16	

Updated to match(es) played on 7 November 1999. Source: Japan Football League
Rules for classification: 1) points; 2) goal difference; 3) number of goals scored.
(C) Champion; (P) Promoted

== National team (Men) ==
=== Results ===
1999.03.31	Japan	0–2	Brazil	Tokyo, Japan
		JFA	? (?) ? (?)	Stadium: Tokyo National Stadium; Attendance: 53,903

1999.06.03	Japan	0–0	Belgium	Tokyo, Japan
		JFA		Stadium: Tokyo National Stadium; Attendance: 54,685

1999.06.06	Japan	0–0	Peru	Kanagawa, Japan
		JFA		Stadium: International Stadium Yokohama; Attendance: 67,354

1999.06.29	Japan	2–3	Peru	Asunción, Paraguay
	Lopes 7'; Miura 78'	JFA	? (?) ? (?) ? (?)

1999.07.02	Japan	0–4	Paraguay	Asunción, Paraguay
		JFA	? (?) ? (?) ? (?) ? (?)

1999.07.05	Japan	1–1	Bolivia	Pedro Juan Caballero, Paraguay
	Lopes 73'	JFA	? (?)

1999.09.08	Japan	1–1	Iran	Kanagawa, Japan
	Oku 10'	JFA	? (?)	Stadium: International Stadium Yokohama; Attendance: 35,860

=== Players statistics ===
Player	-1998	03.31	06.03	06.06	06.29	07.02	07.05	09.08	1999	Total
Masami Ihara	119(5)	O	-	-	O	-	O	-	3(0)	122(5)
Tsuyoshi Kitazawa	57(3)	-	-	O	-	-	-	-	1(0)	58(3)
Naoki Soma	53(4)	O	O	O	-	O	-	O	5(0)	58(4)
Hiroshi Nanami	47(6)	O	O	O	O	O	O	-	6(0)	53(6)
Masashi Nakayama	31(14)	O	-	-	-	-	-	-	1(0)	32(14)
Yutaka Akita	30(3)	O	O	O	O	O	O	O	7(0)	37(3)
Yoshikatsu Kawaguchi	30(0)	-	O	-	-	O	-	O	3(0)	33(0)
Shoji Jo	27(5)	O	-	-	O	O	O	O	5(0)	32(5)
Hidetoshi Nakata	26(6)	O	O	O	-	-	-	-	3(0)	29(6)
Masayuki Okano	24(2)	-	-	-	-	-	O	-	1(0)	25(2)
Wagner Lopes	13(3)	O	O	O	O(1)	O	O(1)	O	7(2)	20(5)
Toshihide Saito	13(0)	O	O	O	-	O	-	-	4(0)	17(0)
Masaaki Sawanobori	11(2)	-	-	-	-	-	-	O	1(0)	12(2)
Eisuke Nakanishi	11(0)	-	-	-	-	-	-	O	1(0)	12(0)
Toshihiro Hattori	7(0)	-	O	O	O	-	O	O	5(0)	12(0)
Toshiya Fujita	6(2)	-	O	O	-	O	O	-	4(0)	10(2)
Kazuaki Tasaka	4(0)	O	O	-	O	-	-	-	3(0)	7(0)
Shigeyoshi Mochizuki	3(0)	-	-	-	O	-	O	-	2(0)	5(0)
Teruyoshi Ito	2(0)	O	O	O	O	O	O	O	7(0)	9(0)
Atsushi Yanagisawa	2(0)	O	O	O	-	-	-	O	4(0)	6(0)
Seigo Narazaki	2(0)	-	-	O	O	-	O	-	3(0)	5(0)
Daisuke Oku	1(0)	-	O	O	O	-	O	O(1)	5(1)	6(1)
Tatsuhiko Kubo	1(0)	-	-	-	-	-	-	O	1(0)	2(0)
Ryuzo Morioka	0(0)	O	O	O	O	O	O	O	7(0)	7(0)
Atsuhiro Miura	0(0)	-	-	O	O(1)	O	O	O	5(1)	5(1)
Takashi Fukunishi	0(0)	-	-	-	O	O	-	O	3(0)	3(0)
Takashi Shimoda	0(0)	O	-	-	-	-	-	-	1(0)	1(0)
Masahiro Ando	0(0)	-	-	-	-	O	-	-	1(0)	1(0)
Kota Yoshihara	0(0)	-	-	-	-	O	-	-	1(0)	1(0)
Yuji Nakazawa	0(0)	-	-	-	-	-	-	O	1(0)	1(0)

== National team (Women) ==
=== Results ===
1999.03.24	Japan	1–0	France	France
	Kobayashi (?)

1999.04.29	Japan	0–9	United States	United States
			? (?) ? (?) ? (?) ? (?) ? (?) ? (?) ? (?) ? (?) ? (?)

1999.05.02	Japan	0–7	United States	United States
			? (?) ? (?) ? (?) ? (?) ? (?) ? (?) ? (?)

1999.05.30	Japan	1–1	South Korea	Kyoto, Japan
	Uchiyama (?)		? (?)	Stadium: Nishikyogoku Athletic Stadium

1999.06.03	Japan	3–2	South Korea	Tokyo, Japan
	Kobayashi (?); Uchiyama (?); Otake (?)		? (?) ? (?)	Stadium: National Stadium

1999.06.19	Japan	1–1	Canada	United States
	Otake (?)		? (?)

1999.06.23	Japan	0–5	Russia	United States
			? (?) ? (?) ? (?) ? (?) ? (?)

1999.06.26	Japan	0–4	Norway	United States
			? (?) ? (?) ? (?) ? (?)

1999.11.08	Japan	9–0	Thailand	Philippines
	Yamagishi (?); Isaka (?); Uchiyama (?); Takakura (?); Otake (?)

1999.11.10	Japan	5–1	Uzbekistan	Philippines
	Obe (?); Takakura (?); Otake (?)		? (?)

1999.11.12	Japan	14–0	Nepal	Philippines
	Obe (?); Yamagishi (?); Mitsui (?); Mikami (?); Isaka (?); Aizawa (?); Takakura (?); Uchiyama (?); Kasajima (?)

1999.11.14	Japan	6–0	Philippines	Philippines
	Yamagishi (?); Hara (?); Isaka (?); Aizawa (?)

1999.11.19	Japan	0–2	Chinese Taipei	Philippines
			? (?) ? (?)

1999.11.21	Japan	2–3	North Korea	Philippines
	Otake (?)		? (?) ? (?) ? (?)

=== Players statistics ===
Player	-1998	03.24	04.29	05.02	05.30	06.03	06.19	06.23	06.26	11.08	11.10	11.12	11.14	11.19	11.21	1999	Total
Asako Takakura	73(24)	-	-	-	-	-	-	-	-	O(2)	O(1)	O(2)	O	O	O	6(5)	79(29)
Homare Sawa	45(25)	O	O	O	O	O	O	O	O	-	-	-	-	-	-	8(0)	53(25)
Rie Yamaki	45(3)	-	-	O	O	O	-	O	O	-	-	-	-	-	-	5(0)	50(3)
Tamaki Uchiyama	44(22)	O	O	O	O(1)	O(1)	O	O	O	O(1)	O	O(1)	O	O	O	14(4)	58(26)
Yumi Tomei	37(6)	-	-	O	O	O	O	O	O	-	-	-	-	-	-	6(0)	43(6)
Nami Otake	36(18)	O	O	O	-	O(1)	O(1)	O	O	O(4)	O(3)	-	-	-	O(2)	10(11)	46(29)
Kae Nishina	36(1)	O	-	-	O	O	O	O	O	-	-	-	-	-	-	6(0)	42(1)
Yumi Obe	32(2)	-	-	-	-	-	-	-	-	O	O(1)	O(1)	O	O	O	6(2)	38(4)
Tomomi Mitsui	16(3)	O	O	O	O	O	O	O	O	O	O	O(2)	O	O	O	14(2)	30(5)
Tomoe Sakai	16(0)	O	O	O	O	O	O	O	-	O	O	O	O	O	O	13(0)	29(0)
Hiromi Isozaki	15(0)	O	O	O	O	O	O	O	O	-	-	-	-	-	-	8(0)	23(0)
Nozomi Yamago	14(0)	O	O	-	-	-	O	O	O	O	O	-	O	O	O	10(0)	24(0)
Mayumi Omatsu	11(1)	-	-	-	O	-	-	-	-	-	-	-	-	-	-	1(0)	12(1)
Shiho Onodera	10(0)	-	-	-	O	-	-	-	-	-	-	-	-	-	-	1(0)	11(0)
Mito Isaka	7(3)	O	O	O	O	O	O	O	O	O(1)	O	O(1)	O(3)	O	O	14(5)	21(8)
Mai Nakachi	7(0)	O	O	O	-	-	-	-	-	-	-	-	-	-	-	3(0)	10(0)
Kazumi Kishi	5(2)	-	-	O	-	-	-	-	-	-	-	-	-	-	-	1(0)	6(2)
Yasuyo Yamagishi	4(1)	-	-	-	-	-	-	-	-	O(1)	O	O(1)	O(1)	O	-	5(3)	9(4)
Miyuki Yanagita	3(2)	O	O	O	O	O	-	O	O	-	-	-	-	-	-	7(0)	10(2)
Ayumi Hara	3(0)	-	-	O	O	O	O	O	O	O	O	O	O(1)	O	O	12(1)	15(1)
Rie Kimura	2(0)	-	-	-	-	-	-	-	-	O	O	O	O	O	O	6(0)	8(0)
Tomomi Fujimura	1(0)	-	-	-	-	-	-	-	-	O	O	O	O	O	O	6(0)	7(0)
Kaoru Nagadome	1(0)	O	O	-	-	O	-	-	-	-	-	-	-	-	-	3(0)	4(0)
Yayoi Kobayashi	0(0)	O(1)	O	O	O	O(1)	O	O	O	-	-	-	-	-	-	8(2)	8(2)
Yoshie Kasajima	0(0)	-	-	-	-	-	-	-	-	O	O	O(1)	-	O	O	5(1)	5(1)
Megumi Torigoe	0(0)	-	-	-	-	-	-	-	-	O	O	-	O	O	O	5(0)	5(0)
Mai Aizawa	0(0)	-	-	-	-	-	-	-	-	-	-	O(3)	O(1)	-	O	3(4)	3(4)
Shoko Mikami	0(0)	-	-	-	-	-	-	-	-	-	-	O(2)	O	O	-	3(2)	3(2)
Naoko Nishigai	0(0)	-	-	O	-	O	-	-	-	-	-	-	-	-	-	2(0)	2(0)
Kozue Ando	0(0)	-	-	-	-	-	-	-	O	-	-	-	-	-	-	1(0)	1(0)
Mari Miyamoto	0(0)	-	-	-	-	-	-	-	-	-	-	O	-	-	-	1(0)	1(0)

== Births ==
- 17 May: Daiki Hashioka
