= 2001 in Japanese football =

2001 season

Japanese football in 2001

== National team (Men) ==
=== Results ===
| 2001.03.24 | Japan | 0–5 | France | Saint-Denis, France |
| | | JFA | Zidane 10' (pen.); Henry 14'; Wiltord 56'; Trezeguet 62', 65' | Attendance: 77,888 |

| 2001.04.25 | Japan | 0–1 | Spain | Córdoba, Spain |
| | | JFA | Baraja 89' | Attendance: 15,000 |

| 2001.05.31 | Japan | 3–0 | Canada | Niigata, Japan |
| | Ono 57'; Nishizawa 60'; Morishima 88' | JFA | | Stadium: Niigata Stadium; Attendance: 39,006 |

| 2001.06.02 | Japan | 2–0 | Cameroon | Niigata, Japan |
| | Suzuki 8', 65' | JFA | | Stadium: Niigata Stadium; Attendance: 39,430 |

| 2001.06.04 | Japan | 0–0 | Brazil | Ibaraki, Japan |
| | | JFA | | Stadium: Kashima Soccer Stadium; Attendance: 37,470 |

| 2001.06.07 | Japan | 1–0 | Australia | Kanagawa, Japan |
| | H. Nakata 43' | JFA | | Stadium: International Stadium Yokohama; Attendance: 48,699 |

| 2001.06.10 | Japan | 0–1 | France | Kanagawa, Japan |
| | | JFA | Vieira 30' | Stadium: International Stadium Yokohama; Attendance: 65,335 |

| 2001.07.01 | Japan | 2–0 | Paraguay | Hokkaido, Japan |
| | Yanagisawa 16', 50' | JFA | | Stadium: Sapporo Dome; Attendance: 39,073 |

| 2001.07.04 | Japan | 1–0 | Yugoslavia | Ōita, Japan |
| | Inamoto 21' | JFA | | Stadium: Ōita Stadium; Attendance: 38,147 |

| 2001.08.15 | Japan | 3–0 | Australia | Shizuoka, Japan |
| | Yanagisawa 19'; Hattori 53'; Nakayama 66' | JFA | | Stadium: Shizuoka Stadium; Attendance: 46,404 |

| 2001.10.04 | Japan | 0–2 | Senegal | Reims, France |
| | | JFA | Diouef 77'; Thiaw 90' | Attendance: 3,000 |

| 2001.10.07 | Japan | 2–2 | Nigeria | Southampton, England |
| | Yanagisawa 26'; Suzuki 57' | JFA | Matsuda 28' (o.g.); Aghahowa 81' | Attendance: 11,801 |

| 2001.11.07 | Japan | 1–1 | Italy | Saitama, Japan |
| | Yanagisawa 10' | JFA | Doni 51' | Stadium: Saitama Stadium 2002; Attendance: 61,833 |

=== Players statistics ===
| Player | -2000 | 03.24 | 04.25 | 05.31 | 06.02 | 06.04 | 06.07 | 06.10 | 07.01 | 07.04 | 08.15 | 10.04 | 10.07 | 11.07 | 2001 | Total |
| Hiroshi Nanami | 65(9) | O | O | - | - | - | - | - | - | - | - | - | - | - | 2(0) | 67(9) |
| Hiroaki Morishima | 47(10) | - | - | O(1) | O | O | O | O | O | O | O | - | - | O | 9(1) | 56(11) |
| Yoshikatsu Kawaguchi | 41(0) | - | O | O | O | - | O | O | O | O | O | - | O | - | 9(0) | 50(0) |
| Masashi Nakayama | 39(20) | - | - | O | O | O | - | O | O | O | O(1) | - | - | O | 8(1) | 47(21) |
| Shoji Jo | 34(7) | O | - | - | - | - | - | - | - | - | - | - | - | - | 1(0) | 35(7) |
| Hidetoshi Nakata | 33(6) | O | O | O | O | O | O(1) | - | - | - | - | - | - | O | 7(1) | 40(7) |
| Toshihiro Hattori | 24(1) | O | O | - | O | O | O | - | O | O | O(1) | O | O | O | 11(1) | 35(2) |
| Ryuzo Morioka | 21(0) | O | O | O | O | - | O | O | O | O | O | O | - | O | 11(0) | 32(0) |
| Daisuke Oku | 18(2) | - | O | - | - | - | - | - | - | - | O | O | O | - | 4(0) | 22(2) |
| Akinori Nishizawa | 16(8) | O | O | O(1) | O | - | O | O | - | - | - | - | O | O | 8(1) | 24(9) |
| Atsushi Yanagisawa | 16(4) | - | - | - | - | - | - | - | O(2) | O | O(1) | O | O(1) | O(1) | 6(5) | 22(9) |
| Shunsuke Nakamura | 16(3) | O | - | - | - | - | - | - | - | - | - | - | - | - | 1(0) | 17(3) |
| Teruyoshi Ito | 16(0) | O | O | O | - | O | - | O | O | O | O | O | O | O | 11(0) | 27(0) |
| Shinji Ono | 15(1) | - | - | O(1) | O | O | O | O | O | O | - | - | O | O | 9(1) | 24(2) |
| Shigeyoshi Mochizuki | 14(1) | O | - | - | - | - | - | - | - | - | - | - | - | - | 1(0) | 15(1) |
| Junichi Inamoto | 14(0) | O | O | O | O | - | O | O | O | O(1) | - | O | O | O | 11(1) | 25(1) |
| Naoki Matsuda | 14(0) | O | - | - | O | O | O | O | O | O | O | O | O | - | 10(0) | 24(0) |
| Seigo Narazaki | 14(0) | O | - | - | - | - | - | - | - | - | - | - | - | - | 1(0) | 15(0) |
| Atsuhiro Miura | 13(1) | O | - | O | - | - | - | O | - | - | - | - | - | - | 3(0) | 16(1) |
| Naohiro Takahara | 11(8) | O | O | - | - | - | - | - | - | - | - | O | - | O | 4(0) | 15(8) |
| Tomokazu Myojin | 9(2) | O | O | O | O | O | - | - | - | - | O | - | - | O | 7(0) | 16(2) |
| Yuji Nakazawa | 7(2) | O | O | - | - | - | - | - | - | - | - | - | - | - | 2(0) | 9(2) |
| Koji Nakata | 7(0) | O | O | O | O | O | O | O | O | O | O | O | O | O | 13(0) | 20(0) |
| Tatsuhiko Kubo | 7(0) | - | - | - | - | - | - | O | - | O | - | - | - | - | 2(0) | 9(0) |
| Takashi Fukunishi | 3(0) | - | - | - | - | - | - | - | - | - | - | O | O | - | 2(0) | 5(0) |
| Tsuneyasu Miyamoto | 2(0) | - | - | - | - | - | - | - | - | O | - | - | O | O | 3(0) | 5(0) |
| Takayuki Suzuki | 0(0) | - | O | - | O(2) | O | O | - | O | O | O | O | O(1) | O | 10(3) | 10(3) |
| Yasuhiro Hato | 0(0) | - | O | - | - | O | O | O | O | O | O | O | O | O | 10(0) | 10(0) |
| Kazuyuki Toda | 0(0) | - | - | O | O | - | O | O | O | O | O | O | O | O | 10(0) | 10(0) |
| Kenichi Uemura | 0(0) | - | O | O | - | O | O | - | - | - | - | - | - | - | 4(0) | 4(0) |
| Yoshiteru Yamashita | 0(0) | - | - | - | - | O | - | - | O | - | - | - | - | - | 2(0) | 2(0) |
| Ryōta Tsuzuki | 0(0) | - | - | - | - | O | - | - | - | - | - | O | - | - | 2(0) | 2(0) |
| Chikara Fujimoto | 0(0) | - | - | - | - | - | - | - | O | - | - | O | - | - | 2(0) | 2(0) |
| Nozomi Hiroyama | 0(0) | - | - | - | - | - | - | - | - | - | - | O | O | - | 2(0) | 2(0) |
| Hitoshi Sogahata | 0(0) | - | - | - | - | - | - | - | - | - | - | - | - | O | 1(0) | 1(0) |

== National team (Women) ==
=== Results ===
| 2001.03.16 | Japan | 2–0 | Chinese Taipei | Chinese Taipei |
| | Otani (?); Kasajima (?) |

| 2001.08.03 | Japan | 1–1 | South Korea | South Korea |
| | Kobayashi (?) | | ? (?) |

| 2001.08.05 | Japan | 2–2 | China | South Korea |
| | Sato (?); Isaka (?) | | ? (?) ? (?) |

| 2001.08.08 | Japan | 1–1 | Brazil | South Korea |
| | Isozaki (?) | | ? (?) |

| 2001.09.07 | Japan | 0–1 | Germany | United States |
| | | | ? (?) |

| 2001.09.09 | Japan | 0–3 | China | United States |
| | | | ? (?) ? (?) ? (?) |

| 2001.12.04 | Japan | 14–0 | Singapore | Chinese Taipei |
| | Kasajima (?); Sawa (?); Otani (?); Isaka (?); Sato (?); Obe (?) |

| 2001.12.08 | Japan | 11–0 | Guam | Chinese Taipei |
| | Sawa (?); Isaka (?); Ito (?); Otani (?); Fujimura (?); Isozaki (?) |

| 2001.12.10 | Japan | 0–1 | North Korea | Chinese Taipei |
| | | | ? (?) |

| 2001.12.12 | Japan | 3–1 | Vietnam | Chinese Taipei |
| | Ito (?); Otani (?) | | ? (?) |

| 2001.12.14 | Japan | 2–1 | South Korea | Chinese Taipei |
| | Kobayashi (?); Otani (?) | | ? (?) |

| 2001.12.16 | Japan | 0–2 | North Korea | Chinese Taipei |
| | | | ? (?) ? (?) |

=== Players statistics ===
| Player | -2000 | 03.16 | 08.03 | 08.05 | 08.08 | 09.07 | 09.09 | 12.04 | 12.08 | 12.10 | 12.12 | 12.14 | 12.16 | 2001 | Total |
| Homare Sawa | 54(26) | - | - | - | - | O | O | O(4) | O(2) | O | O | O | O | 8(6) | 62(32) |
| Yumi Obe | 44(5) | O | O | O | O | O | O | O(1) | O | O | O | O | O | 12(1) | 56(6) |
| Tomoe Sakai | 30(0) | O | - | O | O | O | - | - | - | - | - | - | - | 4(0) | 34(0) |
| Hiromi Isozaki | 28(0) | O | O | - | O(1) | O | O | O | O(2) | O | - | O | O | 10(3) | 38(3) |
| Nozomi Yamago | 28(0) | O | O | O | O | O | O | O | - | O | - | O | O | 10(0) | 38(0) |
| Mito Isaka | 26(8) | - | O | O(1) | O | O | O | O(4) | O(2) | O | O | O | O | 11(7) | 37(15) |
| Ayumi Hara | 21(1) | O | O | O | O | - | - | - | - | - | - | - | - | 4(0) | 25(1) |
| Yasuyo Yamagishi | 14(5) | O | O | O | - | O | O | O | O | O | O | O | O | 11(0) | 25(5) |
| Rie Kimura | 14(0) | O | O | O | - | - | - | - | O | O | - | O | O | 7(0) | 21(0) |
| Miyuki Yanagita | 13(2) | - | - | - | - | - | - | - | - | - | - | - | O | 1(0) | 14(2) |
| Tomomi Fujimura | 13(0) | O | - | - | - | - | - | - | O(1) | O | O | - | - | 4(1) | 17(1) |
| Shiho Onodera | 13(0) | O | - | - | - | - | - | - | O | - | O | - | - | 3(0) | 16(0) |
| Mai Nakachi | 11(0) | O | O | O | O | O | O | O | - | - | O | - | - | 8(0) | 19(0) |
| Yoshie Kasajima | 10(1) | O(1) | - | O | O | O | O | O(1) | - | O | - | O | O | 9(2) | 19(3) |
| Yayoi Kobayashi | 9(2) | O | O(1) | O | O | O | O | O | O | O | O | O(1) | O | 12(2) | 21(4) |
| Megumi Torigoe | 7(0) | O | - | - | - | - | - | - | - | - | - | - | - | 1(0) | 8(0) |
| Kazumi Kishi | 6(2) | - | O | O | O | - | - | - | - | - | - | - | - | 3(0) | 9(2) |
| Yuka Yamazaki | 6(0) | O | - | - | - | - | - | - | - | - | - | - | - | 1(0) | 7(0) |
| Mio Otani | 5(0) | O(1) | O | - | O | O | O | O(2) | O(3) | O | O(2) | O(1) | O | 11(9) | 16(9) |
| Harue Sato | 4(1) | O | O | O(1) | - | O | O | O(2) | - | O | O | - | O | 9(3) | 13(4) |
| Naoko Kawakami | 0(0) | O | O | - | O | - | O | O | O | O | O | O | O | 10(0) | 10(0) |
| Kanako Ito | 0(0) | - | - | O | O | - | O | O | O(1) | - | O(1) | - | - | 6(2) | 6(2) |
| Yuka Miyazaki | 0(0) | - | - | O | O | - | O | - | O | - | O | - | - | 5(0) | 5(0) |
| Noriko Baba | 0(0) | - | O | - | O | O | O | - | - | - | - | - | - | 4(0) | 4(0) |
| Yuki Tsuchihashi | 0(0) | - | - | O | - | O | O | - | - | - | - | O | - | 4(0) | 4(0) |
| Nao Shikata | 0(0) | - | - | - | - | - | - | O | O | - | O | - | - | 3(0) | 3(0) |

== Births ==
- 4 June: Takefusa Kubo
