= Eriko Arakawa =

Japanese football player

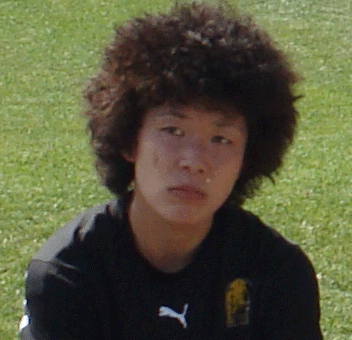

Personal information
- Full name: Eriko Arakawa
- Date of birth: 30 October 1979 (age 47)
- Place of birth: Nerima, Tokyo, Japan
- Height: 1.66 m (5 ft 5 1/2 in)
- Position: Forward

Team information
- Current team: Chifure AS Elfen Saitama
- Number: 9

Youth career
- 1995–1996: Nippon TV Beleza

Senior career*
Years	Team	Apps	(Gls)
1997–2009	Nippon TV Beleza	140	(68)
2009	Gold Pride	19	(1)
2009	Nippon TV Beleza	4	(1)
2010–2012	Urawa Reds	31	(15)
2013–2014	Chifure AS Elfen Saitama	40	(30)
2015	Nippon TV Beleza	2	(0)
2016	Chifure AS Elfen Saitama	14	(4)
2017	Nittaidai SMG Yokohama	12	(4)
2018–	Chifure AS Elfen Saitama	18	(5)
Total		280	(128)

International career
2000–2011	Japan	72	(20)
Medal record
Nippon TV Beleza
Winner	Nadeshiko League	2000
Winner	Nadeshiko League	2001
Winner	Nadeshiko League	2002
Winner	Nadeshiko League	2005
Winner	Nadeshiko League	2006
Winner	Nadeshiko League	2007
Winner	Nadeshiko League	2008
Winner	Nadeshiko League	2015
Runner-up	Nadeshiko League	1997
Runner-up	Nadeshiko League	1998
Runner-up	Nadeshiko League	1999
Runner-up	Nadeshiko League	2003
Runner-up	Nadeshiko League	2004
Runner-up	Nadeshiko League	2009
Winner	Nadeshiko League Cup	1999
Winner	Nadeshiko League Cup	2007
Runner-up	Nadeshiko League Cup	1997
Winner	Empress's Cup	1997
Winner	Empress's Cup	2000
Winner	Empress's Cup	2004
Winner	Empress's Cup	2005
Winner	Empress's Cup	2007
Winner	Empress's Cup	2008
Winner	Empress's Cup	2009
Runner-up	Empress's Cup	2002
Runner-up	Empress's Cup	2003
Urawa Reds
Runner-up	Nadeshiko League	2010
Runner-up	Nadeshiko League Cup	2010
Runner-up	Empress's Cup	2010
Representing Japan
AFC Women's Asian Cup
Bronze medal – third place	2008 Vietnam
Asian Games
Silver medal – second place	2006 Doha	Team
- * Club domestic league appearances and goals as of 31 December 2018

Eriko Arakawa (荒川 恵理子, Arakawa Eriko; born 30 October 1979) is a Japanese football player. She plays for Chifure AS Elfen Saitama and formerly played for the Japan national team.

== Club career ==
Arakawa was born in Nerima, Tokyo on 30 October 1979. In 1997, she joined L.League club Yomiuri-Seiyu Beleza (later Nippon TV Beleza) from youth team. She was selected Best Eleven in 2003 and 2004. In the September 2008 WPS International Draft, she was drafted by FC Gold Pride in the top level US based Women's Professional Soccer league.

In her first appearance for FC Gold Pride, Arakawa scored the club's first ever goal against the Boston Breakers in a 2–1 victory. It would turn out to be her only goal of the season. Following the end of the 2009 WPS season, she was back to Nippon TV Beleza.

In 2010, she moved to Urawa Reds. From 2013, she played for Chifure AS Elfen Saitama (2013-2014, 2016), Nippon TV Beleza (2015) and Nippon Sport Science University Fields Yokohama (2017). She is currently playing for Chifure AS Elfen Saitama from 2018.

== National team career ==
On 10 June 2000, Arakawa debuted for Japan national team against Canada. She was a member of Japan's squads at the 2003 and 2007 World Cups, and the 2004 and 2008 Summer Olympics. She played 72 games and scored 20 goals for Japan until 2011.

== Club statistics ==
Team	Season	League	Domestic League					Domestic Playoffs					Total				
Team	Season	League	Apps	Starts	Minutes	Goals	Assists	Apps	Starts	Minutes	Goals	Assists	Apps	Starts	Minutes	Goals	Assists
FC Gold Pride	2009	WPS	19	11	1088	1	1	–	–	–	–	–	19	11	1088	1	1
		Total	19	11	1088	1	1	–	–	–	–	–	19	11	1088	1	1
Career Total		–	19	11	1088	1	1	–	–	–	–	–	19	11	1088	1	1

== National team statistics ==
Japan national team
Year	Apps	Goals
2000	2	0
2001	0	0
2002	0	0
2003	13	5
2004	10	5
2005	0	0
2006	14	3
2007	15	4
2008	14	3
2009	1	0
2010	0	0
2011	3	0
Total	72	20

== International goals ==
No.	Date	Venue	Opponent	Score	Result	Competition
1.	9 June 2003	Bangkok, Thailand	Philippines	2–0	15–0	2003 AFC Women's Championship
2.	22 July 2003	Sendai, Japan	South Korea	3–0	5–0	Friendly
3.	22 July 2003	Sendai, Japan	South Korea	5–0	5–0	Friendly
4.	14 September 2003	Concord, United States	France	2–2	2–2	Friendly
6.	24 April 2004	Tokyo, Japan	North Korea	1–0	3–0	2004 Summer Olympics qualification
7.	11 August 2004	Volos, Greece	Sweden	1–0	1–0	2004 Summer Olympics
16.	15 April 2007	Bangkok, Thailand	Thailand	2–0	4–0	2008 Summer Olympics qualification
17.	3 June 2007	Tokyo, Japan	South Korea	3–0	6–1	2008 Summer Olympics qualification
18.	21 February 2008	Chongqing, China	South Korea	1–0	2–0	2008 EAFF Women's Football Championship
19.	31 May 2008	Hồ Chí Minh City, Vietnam	Chinese Taipei	4–0	11–0	2008 AFC Women's Asian Cup
20.	18 August 2008	Beijing, China	United States	2–4	2–4	2008 Summer Olympics
