= Miyuki Yanagita =

Japanese footballer

Miyuki Yanagita 柳田 美幸
Personal information
- Full name: Miyuki Yanagita
- Date of birth: April 11, 1981 (age 45)
- Place of birth: Chigasaki, Kanagawa, Japan
- Height: 1.58 m (5 ft 2 in)
- Position: Midfielder

Senior career*
| Years | Team | Apps | (Gls) |
| 1997–1999 | NTV Beleza | 32 | (7) |
| 2000–2005 | Tasaki Perule FC | 85 | (19) |
| 2006–2012 | Urawa Reds | 122 | (20) |
| Total | | 239 | (46) |

International career
| 1997–2008 | Japan | 91 | (11) |
Medal record
NTV Beleza
| Runner-up | Nadeshiko League | 1997 |
| Runner-up | Nadeshiko League | 1998 |
| Runner-up | Nadeshiko League | 1999 |
| Winner | Nadeshiko League Cup | 1999 |
| Runner-up | Nadeshiko League Cup | 1997 |
| Winner | Empress's Cup | 1997 |
Tasaki Perule FC
| Winner | Nadeshiko League | 2003 |
| Runner-up | Nadeshiko League | 2001 |
| Runner-up | Nadeshiko League | 2002 |
| Runner-up | Nadeshiko League | 2005 |
| Winner | Empress's Cup | 2002 |
| Winner | Empress's Cup | 2003 |
| Runner-up | Empress's Cup | 2000 |
| Runner-up | Empress's Cup | 2001 |
| Runner-up | Empress's Cup | 2005 |
Urawa Reds
| Winner | Nadeshiko League | 2009 |
| Runner-up | Nadeshiko League | 2006 |
| Runner-up | Nadeshiko League | 2010 |
| Runner-up | Nadeshiko League Cup | 2007 |
| Runner-up | Nadeshiko League Cup | 2010 |
| Runner-up | Empress's Cup | 2009 |
| Runner-up | Empress's Cup | 2010 |
Representing Japan
AFC Women's Asian Cup
| Silver medal – second place | 2001 Chinese Taipei |
| Bronze medal – third place | 1997 China |
| Bronze medal – third place | 2008 Vietnam |
Asian Games
| Silver medal – second place | 2006 Doha | Team |
| Bronze medal – third place | 1998 Bangkok | Team |
| Bronze medal – third place | 2002 Busan | Team |
- * Club domestic league appearances and goals

Miyuki Yanagita (柳田 美幸, Yanagita Miyuki; born April 11, 1981) is a former Japanese football player. She played for Japan national team.

== Club career ==
Yanagita was born in Chigasaki on April 11, 1981. When she was a high school student, she played for NTV Beleza. In 2000, she graduated from high school and she joined Tasaki Perule FC. In 2006, she moved to Urawa Reds. She retired end of 2012 season. She played 239 matches at 3 clubs in L.League and she was selected Best Eleven 3 times (2006, 2009 and 2010).

== National team career ==
In December 1997, when Yanagita was 16 years old, she was selected Japan national team for 1997 AFC Championship. At this competition, on December 5, she debuted and scored a goal against Guam. She was a member of Japan for 1999, 2003, 2007 World Cup, 2004 and 2008 Summer Olympics. She played 91 games and scored 11 goals for Japan until 2008.

== National team statistics ==
Japan national team
| Year | Apps | Goals |
|---|---|---|
| 1997 | 3 | 2 |
| 1998 | 0 | 0 |
| 1999 | 7 | 0 |
| 2000 | 3 | 0 |
| 2001 | 1 | 0 |
| 2002 | 10 | 1 |
| 2003 | 3 | 0 |
| 2004 | 11 | 0 |
| 2005 | 9 | 3 |
| 2006 | 15 | 4 |
| 2007 | 14 | 1 |
| 2008 | 15 | 0 |
| Total | 91 | 11 |

=== International goals ===
| No. | Date | Venue | Opponent | Score | Result | Competition |
|---|---|---|---|---|---|---|
| 1. | 5 December 1997 | Guangzhou, China | Guam | ?–0 | 21–0 | 1997 AFC Women's Championship |
| 2. | 9 December 1997 | Guangzhou, China | Hong Kong | ?–0 | 9–0 | 1997 AFC Women's Championship |
| 3. | 9 April 2002 | Limoges, France | Canada | ?–? | 3–2 | Friendly |
| 4. | 26 March 2005 | Sydney, Australia | Australia | 2–0 | 2–0 | Friendly |
| 5. | 26 May 2005 | Russia | Russia | ?–? | 4–2 | Friendly |
| 6. | 26 May 2005 | Russia | Russia | ?–? | 4–2 | Friendly |
| 7. | 21 July 2006 | Adelaide, Australia | Chinese Taipei | 7–1 | 11–1 | 2006 AFC Women's Asian Cup |
| 8. | 30 November 2006 | Doha, Qatar | Jordan | 1–0 | 13–0 | 2006 Asian Games |
| 9. | 30 November 2006 | Doha, Qatar | Jordan | 8–0 | 13–0 | 2006 Asian Games |
| 10. | 10 December 2006 | Doha, Qatar | South Korea | 2–0 | 3–1 | 2006 Asian Games |
| 11. | 12 August 2007 | Tokyo, Japan | Thailand | 3–0 | 5–0 | 2008 Summer Olympics qualification |
