= Naoko Kawakami =

Japanese footballer

Naoko Kawakami 川上 直子
Personal information
- Full name: Naoko Kawakami
- Date of birth: November 16, 1977 (age 48)
- Place of birth: Akashi, Hyogo, Japan
- Height: 1.56 m (5 ft 1 1/2 in)
- Position: Midfielder

Senior career*
Years	Team	Apps	(Gls)
1990–2004	Tasaki Perule FC	176+	(22+)
2005–2006	Nippon TV Beleza	38	(2)
Total		214+	(24+)

International career
2001–2005	Japan	48	(0)
Medal record
Tasaki Perule FC
Winner	Nadeshiko League	2003
Runner-up	Nadeshiko League	2001
Runner-up	Nadeshiko League	2002
Winner	Empress's Cup	1999
Winner	Empress's Cup	2002
Winner	Empress's Cup	2003
Runner-up	Empress's Cup	2000
Runner-up	Empress's Cup	2001
Nippon TV Beleza
Winner	Nadeshiko League	2005
Winner	Nadeshiko League	2006
Winner	Empress's Cup	2005
Representing Japan
AFC Women's Asian Cup
Silver medal – second place	2001 Chinese Taipei
Asian Games
Bronze medal – third place	2002 Busan	Team
- * Club domestic league appearances and goals

Naoko Kawakami (川上 直子, Kawakami Naoko; born November 16, 1977) is a former Japanese football player. She played for Japan national team.

== Club career ==
Kawakami was born in Akashi on November 16, 1977. In 1990, she was 13 years old, she joined for Tasaki-Shinju Kobe (later Tasaki Perule FC). She previously played midfielder. However, when she entered Japan national team, she became a right back. After success at this position, she remained a defender when she transferred to Nippon TV Beleza. She had a lot of success with her two clubs, winning one L.League title with her first club in 2003 and three Empress's Cups, and two other titles with her second one. She was also selected Best Eleven 5 times (2000, 2002, 2003, 2004 and 2005).

== National team career ==
On March 16, 2001, Kawakami debuted for Japan national team against Chinese Taipei. She played at 2001, 2003 AFC Championship and 2002 Asian Games. She was also a member of Japan for 2003 World Cup and the 2004 Olympic Games. She played 48 games for Japan until 2005.

== After retirement ==
After retiring from international football in 2005 and from football the following year, Kawakami became a commentator for NBS at the 2007 World Cup qualification round. She then commented the final tournament for Fuji TV. In 2011, she was commentator for NHK during the Women's World Cup tournament, including when the Japan national team won the world title.

== National team statistics ==
Japan national team
Year	Apps	Goals
2001	10	0
2002	10	0
2003	14	0
2004	10	0
2005	4	0
Total	48	0

== Achievements ==
=== Individual ===
5 times in the best eleven: 2000, 2002, 2003, 2004, 2005

=== Club ===
Tasaki Perule FC

- 1 L.League championship title: 2003 (runners-up in 2001 and 2002)
- 3 Empress's Cup: 2000, 2003, 2004

Nippon TV Bereza

- 2 L.League championship title : 2005, 2006
- 1 Empress's Cup: 2006
