= Mio Otani =

Japanese footballer

Mio Otani 大谷 未央
Personal information
- Full name: Mio Otani
- Date of birth: May 5, 1979 (age 47)
- Place of birth: Koka, Shiga, Japan
- Height: 1.60 m (5 ft 3 in)
- Position: Forward

Youth career
- 1995–1996: Nishiyama High School
- 1997: Keimei Gakuin High School

Senior career*
Years	Team	Apps	(Gls)
1998–2008	Tasaki Perule FC	180	(150)
Total		180	(150)

International career
2000–2007	Japan	73	(31)
Medal record
Tasaki Perule FC
Winner	Nadeshiko League	2003
Runner-up	Nadeshiko League	2001
Runner-up	Nadeshiko League	2002
Runner-up	Nadeshiko League	2005
Runner-up	Nadeshiko League	2007
Winner	Empress's Cup	1999
Winner	Empress's Cup	2002
Winner	Empress's Cup	2003
Winner	Empress's Cup	2006
Runner-up	Empress's Cup	2000
Runner-up	Empress's Cup	2001
Runner-up	Empress's Cup	2005
Runner-up	Empress's Cup	2007
Representing Japan
AFC Women's Asian Cup
Silver medal – second place	2001 Chinese Taipei
Asian Games
Bronze medal – third place	2002 Busan	Team
- * Club domestic league appearances and goals

Mio Otani (大谷 未央, Ōtani Mio; born May 5, 1979) is a former Japanese football player. She played for Japan national team.

== Club career ==
Otani was born in Koka on May 5, 1979. After graduating from high school, she joined Tasaki Perule FC in 1998. She became top scorer for 3 years in a row (2001 and 2003). In 2003 season, she was also selected MVP awards and the club won L.League championship. In 2005 season, she became top scorer again. However, the club was disbanded in 2008 due to financial strain. So, she retired end of 2008 season. She scored 150 goals in 180 matches in L.League. She was also selected Best Eleven for 3 years in a row (2001-2006).

== National team career ==
On May 31, 2000, Otani debuted for Japan national team against Australia. She was a member of Japan for 2003, 2007 World Cup and 2004 Summer Olympics. She scored a hat trick in Japan's victory over Argentina in the 2003 World Cup. She also played at 2001, 2003 AFC Championship, 2002 Asian Games and 2006 Asian Cup. She played 73 games and scored 31 goals for Japan until 2007.

== National team statistics ==
Japan national team
Year	Apps	Goals
2000	5	0
2001	11	9
2002	10	2
2003	14	13
2004	10	7
2005	7	0
2006	9	0
2007	7	0
Total	73	31

== International goals ==
No.	Date	Venue	Opponent	Score	Result	Competition
1.	16 March 2001	Taipei, Taiwan	Chinese Taipei	?–0	2–0	Friendly
2.	4 December 2001	New Taipei City, Taiwan	Singapore	?–0	14–0	2001 AFC Women's Championship
3.	4 December 2001	New Taipei City, Taiwan	Singapore	?–0	14–0	2001 AFC Women's Championship
4.	8 December 2001	New Taipei City, Taiwan	Guam	?–0	11–0	2001 AFC Women's Championship
5.	8 December 2001	New Taipei City, Taiwan	Guam	?–0	11–0	2001 AFC Women's Championship
6.	8 December 2001	New Taipei City, Taiwan	Guam	?–0	11–0	2001 AFC Women's Championship
7.	12 December 2001	New Taipei City, Taiwan	Vietnam	?–?	3–1	2001 AFC Women's Championship
8.	12 December 2001	New Taipei City, Taiwan	Vietnam	?–?	3–1	2001 AFC Women's Championship
9.	14 December 2001	New Taipei City, Taiwan	South Korea	2–1	2–1	2001 AFC Women's Championship
10.	4 October 2002	Changwon, South Korea	Vietnam	1–0	3–0	2002 Asian Games
11.	4 October 2002	Changwon, South Korea	Vietnam	2–0	3–0	2002 Asian Games
12.	9 June 2003	Bangkok, Thailand	Philippines	1–0	15–0	2003 AFC Women's Championship
13.	9 June 2003	Bangkok, Thailand	Philippines	3–0	15–0	2003 AFC Women's Championship
14.	9 June 2003	Bangkok, Thailand	Philippines	5–0	15–0	2003 AFC Women's Championship
15.	9 June 2003	Bangkok, Thailand	Philippines	8–0	15–0	2003 AFC Women's Championship
16.	9 June 2003	Bangkok, Thailand	Philippines	9–0	15–0	2003 AFC Women's Championship
17.	9 June 2003	Bangkok, Thailand	Philippines	12–0	15–0	2003 AFC Women's Championship
18.	9 June 2003	Bangkok, Thailand	Philippines	15–0	15–0	2003 AFC Women's Championship
19.	13 June 2003	Bangkok, Thailand	Myanmar	1–0	7–0	2003 AFC Women's Championship
20.	13 June 2003	Bangkok, Thailand	Myanmar	2–0	7–0	2003 AFC Women's Championship
21.	22 July 2003	Sendai, Japan	South Korea	1–0	5–0	Friendly
22.	14 September 2003	Concord, United States	France	1–2	2–2	Friendly
23.	20 September 2003	Columbus, United States	Argentina	4–0	6–0	2003 FIFA Women's World Cup
24.	20 September 2003	Columbus, United States	Argentina	5–0	6–0	2003 FIFA Women's World Cup
25.	20 September 2003	Columbus, United States	Argentina	6–0	6–0	2003 FIFA Women's World Cup
26.	18 April 2004	Tokyo, Japan	Vietnam	2–0	7–0	2004 Summer Olympics qualification
27.	18 April 2004	Tokyo, Japan	Vietnam	4–0	7–0	2004 Summer Olympics qualification
28.	22 April 2004	Tokyo, Japan	Thailand	5–0	6–0	2004 Summer Olympics qualification
29.	24 April 2004	Tokyo, Japan	North Korea	3–0	3–0	2004 Summer Olympics qualification
30.	30 July 2004	Tokyo, Japan	Canada	?–0	3–0	Friendly
31.	30 July 2004	Tokyo, Japan	Canada	?–0	3–0	Friendly
32.	6 August 2004	Zeist, Netherlands	Netherlands	?–0	2–0	Friendly
