= Shoko Mikami =

Japanese footballer (born 1981)

Shoko Mikami 三上 尚子
Personal information
- Full name: Shoko Mikami
- Date of birth: January 8, 1981 (age 45)
- Place of birth: Ichihara, Chiba, Japan
- Position: Forward

Senior career*
Years	Team	Apps	(Gls)
1996–1998	Nikko Securities Dream Ladies		
1999–2001	Tasaki Perule FC		
2002–2003	JEF United Ichihara		
2007–2009	JEF United Chiba		

International career
1999	Japan	3	(2)

Managerial career
- 2014–2017: JEF United Chiba
Medal record
Nikko Securities Dream Ladies
Winner	Nadeshiko League	1996
Winner	Nadeshiko League	1997
Winner	Nadeshiko League	1998
Winner	Empress's Cup	1996
Runner-up	Empress's Cup	1998
Tasaki Perule FC
Runner-up	Nadeshiko League	2001
Winner	Empress's Cup	1999
Runner-up	Empress's Cup	2000
Runner-up	Empress's Cup	2001
- * Club domestic league appearances and goals

Shoko Mikami (三上 尚子, Mikami Shōko; born January 8, 1981) is a former Japanese football player and manager. She played for Japan national team.

== Club career ==
Mikami was born in Ichihara, Chiba on January 8, 1981. In 1996, she joined Nikko Securities Dream Ladies, who won the L.League championship for three years in a row (1996-1998). However, the club was disbanded in 1998 due to financial difficulty. Mikami then moved to Tasaki Perule FC, where she was selected Best Eleven in the 2001 season. In 2002, she moved to her local club JEF United Ichihara (later JEF United Chiba), and in 2003 she went to the United States to play for university teams. From 2004-2006 she played for the University of Memphis. In 2007, she returned to JEF United Chiba, and in 2009, she retired.

== National team career ==
In November 1999, Mikami was selected Japan national team for 1999 AFC Championship. At this competition, on November 12, she debuted and scored 2 goals against Nepal. She played 3 games and scored 2 goals for Japan in 1999.

== Coaching career ==
After retirement, Mikami became coach for youth team at JEF United Chiba. In 2014, she became manager for top team. She managed the team until 2017 season.

== National team statistics ==
Japan national team
Year	Apps	Goals
1999	3	2
Total	3	2

https://gotigersgo.com/sports/womens-soccer/roster/shoko-mikami/621==References==
