= 1998 L.League Cup final =

Prima Ham FC Kunoichi	Matsushita Electric Panasonic Bambina
2	1
- Date: April 12, 1998
- Venue: Nihondaira Sports Stadium, Shizuoka

1998 L.League Cup final was the 3rd final of the L.League Cup competition. The final was played at Nihondaira Sports Stadium in Shizuoka on April 12, 1998. Prima Ham FC Kunoichi won the championship.

== Overview ==
Defending champion Prima Ham FC Kunoichi won their 2nd title, by defeating Matsushita Electric Panasonic Bambina 2–1. Prima Ham FC Kunoichi won the title for 2 years in a row.

== Match details ==
April 12, 1998

Prima Ham FC Kunoichi	2-1	Matsushita Electric Panasonic Bambina
? ?' ? ?'		? ?'

Nihondaira Sports Stadium

== See also ==
- 1998 L.League Cup
