= 1998 L.League Cup =

Statistics of L. League Cup in the 1998 season.

== Overview ==
Prima Ham FC Kunoichi won the championship.

== Results ==
=== Preliminary round ===
==== East ====
Pos	Team	Pld	W	D	L	GF	GA	GD	Pts
1	Yomiuri Beleza	4	3	1	0	10	2	+8	10
2	OKI FC Winds	4	1	2	1	3	4	−1	5
3	Nikko Securities Dream Ladies	4	1	1	2	5	5	0	4
4	Suzuyo Shimizu FC Lovely Ladies	4	1	1	2	4	7	−3	4
5	Fujita SC Mercury	4	1	1	2	6	10	−4	4

==== West ====
Pos	Team	Pld	W	D	L	GF	GA	GD	Pts
1	Prima Ham FC Kunoichi	4	3	0	1	14	7	+7	9
2	Matsushita Electric Panasonic Bambina	4	2	1	1	13	7	+6	7
3	Takarazuka Bunnys	4	2	1	1	9	8	+1	7
4	Tasaki Perule FC	4	2	0	2	7	12	−5	6
5	Shiroki FC Serena	4	0	0	4	4	13	−9	0

=== Final round ===
==== Semifinals ====
- Prima Ham FC Kunoichi 2-1 OKI FC Winds
- Matsushita Electric Panasonic Bambina 2-1 Yomiuri Beleza

==== Final ====
- Prima Ham FC Kunoichi 2-1 Matsushita Electric Panasonic Bambina
