= Hiromi Ikeda =

Japanese footballer (born 1975)

Hiromi Ikeda 池田 浩美
Personal information
- Full name: Hiromi Ikeda
- Date of birth: December 22, 1975 (age 50)
- Place of birth: Honjo, Saitama, Japan
- Height: 1.63 m (5 ft 4 in)
- Position: Defender

Youth career
- Honjo Daiichi High School

Senior career*
Years	Team	Apps	(Gls)
1995–2008	Tasaki Perule FC	236	(15)
Total		236	(15)

International career
1997–2008	Japan	119	(4)
Medal record
Tasaki Perule FC
Winner	Nadeshiko League	2003
Runner-up	Nadeshiko League	2001
Runner-up	Nadeshiko League	2002
Runner-up	Nadeshiko League	2005
Runner-up	Nadeshiko League	2007
Winner	Empress's Cup	1999
Winner	Empress's Cup	2002
Winner	Empress's Cup	2003
Winner	Empress's Cup	2006
Runner-up	Empress's Cup	2000
Runner-up	Empress's Cup	2001
Runner-up	Empress's Cup	2005
Runner-up	Empress's Cup	2007
Representing Japan
AFC Women's Asian Cup
Silver medal – second place	2001 Chinese Taipei
Bronze medal – third place	1997 China
Bronze medal – third place	2008 Vietnam
Asian Games
Silver medal – second place	2006 Doha	Team
Bronze medal – third place	1998 Bangkok	Team
- * Club domestic league appearances and goals

Hiromi Ikeda (池田 浩美, Ikeda Hiromi; born December 22, 1975) (former name; Hiromi Isozaki, 磯﨑 浩美) is a former Japanese football player. She played for the Japan national team.

== Club career ==
Ikeda was born in Honjo on December 22, 1975. She joined Tasaki Perule FC in 1995. She was selected for the Best Young Player award in 1995. She was also selected as one of the Best Eleven for 10 years in a row (1999-2008). However, the club was disbanded in 2008 due to financial strain. She retired at the end of the 2008 season. She played 236 matches in the L.League.

== National team career ==
On June 8, 1997, Ikeda debuted for the Japan national team against China. She was a member of the national team for the 1999, 2003, 2007 World Cups; as well as at the 2004 and 2008 Summer Olympics. At the 2004 Summer Olympics, she played as captain because Captain Yumi Obe was held in reserve. After the 2004 Summer Olympics, she became captain until the 2008 Summer Olympics. She played 119 games and scored 4 goals for Japan until 2008.

== Personal life ==
Ikeda got married in 2007 and changed her name from Hiromi Isozaki (磯﨑 浩美) to Hiromi Ikeda (池田 浩美).

== National team statistics ==
Japan national team
Year	Apps	Goals
1997	6	0
1998	9	0
1999	8	0
2000	5	0
2001	10	3
2002	6	0
2003	11	1
2004	10	0
2005	9	0
2006	17	0
2007	16	0
2008	12	0
Total	119	4

== International goals ==
No.	Date	Venue	Opponent	Score	Result	Competition
4.	13 June 2003	Rajamangala Stadium, Bangkok, Thailand	Myanmar	5–0	7–0	2003 AFC Women's Championship

== Titles ==
- 1 L.League (2003)
- 4 Empress's Cup (1999, 2002, 2003, 2006)
