= 2003 L.League =

L. League
- Season: 2003
- Champions: Tasaki Perule FC; 1st L. League title
- Top goalscorer: Mio Otani (33 goals)

Statistics of L. League in the 2003 season. Tasaki Perule FC won the championship.

== First stage ==
=== East ===
Pos	Team	Pld	W	D	L	GF	GA	GD	Pts	Qualification
1	YKK Tohoku LSC Flappers	12	8	4	0	27	7	+20	28	2nd Stage:1-6 Playoff
2	Saitama Reinas FC	12	8	4	0	28	9	+19	28	2nd Stage:1-6 Playoff
3	Nippon TV Beleza	12	8	3	1	47	6	+41	27	2nd Stage:1-6 Playoff
4	AS Elfen Sayama FC	12	4	1	7	22	29	−7	13	2nd Stage:7-13 Playoff
5	Ohara Gakuen JaSRA LSC	12	3	2	7	18	23	−5	11	2nd Stage:7-13 Playoff
6	Shimizudaihachi SC	12	2	1	9	21	55	−34	7	2nd Stage:7-13 Playoff
7	JEF United Ichihara Ladies	12	0	3	9	11	45	−34	3	2nd Stage:7-13 Playoff

Source: RSSSF

=== West ===
Pos	Team	Pld	W	D	L	GF	GA	GD	Pts	Qualification
1	Tasaki Perule FC	10	10	0	0	56	4	+52	30	2nd Stage:1-6 Playoff
2	Iga FC Kunoichi	10	6	2	2	41	8	+33	20	2nd Stage:1-6 Playoff
3	Speranza FC Takatsuki	10	5	1	4	24	18	+6	16	2nd Stage:1-6 Playoff
4	Okayama Yunogo Belle	10	5	0	5	24	24	0	15	2nd Stage:7-13 Playoff
5	Takarazuka Bunnys Ladies SC	10	2	1	7	14	27	−13	7	2nd Stage:7-13 Playoff
6	Renaissance Kumamoto FC	10	0	0	10	3	81	−78	0	2nd Stage:7-13 Playoff

Source: RSSSF

== Second stage ==
=== Championship playoff ===
Pos	Team	Pld	W	D	L	GF	GA	GD	Pts	Qualification
1	Tasaki Perule FC	10	8	1	1	31	7	+24	25	Champions
2	Nippon TV Beleza	10	6	1	3	15	7	+8	19	
3	Iga FC Kunoichi	10	6	0	4	20	11	+9	18	
4	Saitama Reinas FC	10	5	1	4	13	13	0	16	
5	YKK Tohoku LSC Flappers	10	2	0	8	8	24	−16	6	
6	Speranza FC Takatsuki	10	1	1	8	4	29	−25	4	

Source: RSSSF
- All Teams Stay Division 1 in 2004 Season.

=== Position playoff ===
Pos	Team	Pld	W	D	L	GF	GA	GD	Pts	Qualification or relegation
7	Ohara Gakuen JaSRA LSC	6	5	1	0	21	3	+18	16	Stay/Relegation Playoff
8	Okayama Yunogo Belle	6	4	2	0	24	5	+19	14	Stay/Relegation Playoff
9	Takarazuka Bunnys Ladies SC	6	4	1	1	13	7	+6	13	Stay/Relegation Playoff
10	AS Elfen Sayama FC	6	2	0	4	10	16	−6	6	Stay/Relegation Playoff
11	Shimizudaihachi SC	6	2	0	4	7	14	−7	6	Relegation to Division 2
12	JEF United Ichihara Ladies	6	2	0	4	9	22	−13	6	Relegation to Division 2
13	Renaissance Kumamoto FC	6	0	0	6	4	21	−17	0	Relegation to Division 2

Source: RSSSF
- Shimizudaihachi SC, JEF United Ichihara Ladies, and Renaissance Kumamoto FC were relegated to Division 2 in the 2004 season.

=== Division 1 Stay/Relegation playoff ===
Pos	Team	Pld	W	D	L	GF	GA	GD	Pts	Qualification or relegation
1	Ohara Gakuen JaSRA LSC	3	2	0	1	6	5	+1	6	Stay Division 1
2	Takarazuka Bunnys Ladies SC	3	2	0	1	3	2	+1	6	Stay Division 1
3	Okayama Yunogo Belle	3	1	0	2	9	8	+1	3	Relegation to Division 2
4	AS Elfen Sayama FC	3	1	0	2	4	7	−3	3	Relegation to Division 2

Source: RSSSF
- Ohara Gakuen JaSRA LSC and Takarazuka Bunnys Ladies SC would stay in Division 1 of the 2004 Season.
- Okayama Yunogo Belle, AS Elfen Sayama FC Relegated to Division 2 in 2004 Season.

== League awards ==
=== Best player ===
Player	Club
(Japan) Mio Otani	Tasaki Perule FC

=== Top scorers ===
Rank	Scorer	Club	Goals
1	(Japan) Mio Otani	Tasaki Perule FC	33

=== Best eleven ===
Pos	Player	Club
GK	(Japan) Nozomi Yamago	Saitama Reinas FC
DF	(Japan) Mai Nakachi	Nippon TV Beleza
DF	(Japan) Yumi Obe	YKK Tohoku LSC Flappers
DF	(Japan) Yasuyo Yamagishi	Iga FC Kunoichi
DF	(Japan) Hiromi Isozaki	Tasaki Perule FC
MF	(Japan) Naoko Kawakami	Tasaki Perule FC
MF	(Japan) Tomomi Miyamoto	Iga FC Kunoichi
MF	(Japan) Tomoe Sakai	Nippon TV Beleza
FW	(Japan) Eriko Arakawa	Nippon TV Beleza
FW	(Japan) Mio Otani	Tasaki Perule FC
FW	(Japan) Mito Isaka	Iga FC Kunoichi

=== Best young player ===
Player	Club
(Japan) Yukari Kinga	Nippon TV Beleza

== See also ==
- Empress's Cup
