= 2005 Nadeshiko League =

L. League
- Season: 2005
- Champions: Nippon TV Beleza; 8th L. League title
- Relegated: Takarazuka Bunnys Ladies SC
- Top goalscorer: Mio Otani (25 goals)

Statistics of L. League in the 2005 season. Nippon TV Beleza won the championship.

== Division 1 ==
=== Result ===
Pos	Team	Pld	W	D	L	GF	GA	GD	Pts	Qualification or relegation
1	Nippon TV Beleza	21	18	3	0	84	5	+79	57	Champions
2	Tasaki Perule FC	21	16	3	2	68	13	+55	51	
3	Iga FC Kunoichi	21	11	6	4	29	26	+3	39	
4	TEPCO Mareeze	21	11	1	9	33	30	+3	34	
5	Urawa Reds Ladies	21	10	3	8	40	38	+2	33	
6	Okayama Yunogo Belle	21	5	0	16	20	49	−29	15	
7	Speranza FC Takatsuki	21	3	1	17	14	64	−50	10	
8	Takarazuka Bunnys Ladies SC	21	1	1	19	12	75	−63	4	Relegated to Division 2

Source: RSSSF

=== League awards ===
==== Best player ====
Player	Club
(Japan) Shinobu Ono	Nippon TV Beleza

==== Top scorers ====
Rank	Scorer	Club	Goals
1	(Japan) Mio Otani	Tasaki Perule FC	25

==== Best eleven ====
Pos	Player	Club
GK	(Japan) Shiho Onodera	Nippon TV Beleza
DF	(Japan) Naoko Kawakami	Nippon TV Beleza
DF	(Japan) Aya Shimokozuru	Tasaki Perule FC
DF	(Japan) Nao Shikata	Nippon TV Beleza
DF	(Japan) Hiromi Isozaki	Tasaki Perule FC
MF	(Japan) Homare Sawa	Nippon TV Beleza
MF	(Japan) Kozue Ando	Urawa Reds Ladies
MF	(Japan) Tomoe Sakai	Nippon TV Beleza
FW	(Japan) Yuki Nagasato	Nippon TV Beleza
FW	(Japan) Shinobu Ono	Nippon TV Beleza
FW	(Japan) Mio Otani	Tasaki Perule FC

==== Best young player ====
Player	Club
(Japan) Karina Maruyama	TEPCO Mareeze

== Division 2 ==
=== Result ===
Pos	Team	Pld	W	D	L	GF	GA	GD	Pts	Promotion
1	INAC Leonessa	18	16	1	1	87	16	+71	49	Promoted for Division 1
2	Albirex Niigata Ladies	18	13	2	3	54	18	+36	41	
3	Ohara Gakuen JaSRA LSC	18	9	3	6	48	23	+25	30	
4	AS Elfen Sayama FC	18	8	2	8	35	34	+1	26	
5	JEF United Chiba Ladies	18	7	2	9	23	34	−11	23	
6	Shimizudaihachi SC	18	2	1	15	11	75	−64	7	
7	Renaissance Kumamoto FC	18	1	3	14	14	72	−58	6	

Source: RSSSF
- Best Player: Miwa Yonetsu, INAC Leonessa

== See also ==
- Empress's Cup
