= 2002 L.League =

L. League
- Season: 2002
- Champions: Nippon TV Beleza; 7th L. League title
- Top goalscorer: Mio Otani (11 goals)

Statistics of L. League in the 2002 season. Nippon TV Beleza won the championship.

== First stage ==
=== East ===
Pos	Team	Pld	W	D	L	GF	GA	GD	Pts	Qualification
1	Nippon TV Beleza	5	5	0	0	28	2	+26	15	2nd Stage:1-4 Playoff
2	Saitama Reinas FC	5	3	1	1	17	5	+12	10	2nd Stage:1-4 Playoff
3	YKK Tohoku LSC Flappers	5	3	1	1	16	6	+10	10	2nd Stage:5-11 Playoff
4	AS Elfen Sayama FC	5	1	1	3	7	16	−9	4	2nd Stage:5-11 Playoff
5	JEF United Ichihara Ladies	5	1	1	3	7	20	−13	4	2nd Stage:5-11 Playoff
6	Shimizudaihachi SC	5	0	0	5	3	29	−26	0	2nd Stage:5-11 Playoff

Source: RSSSF

=== West ===
Pos	Team	Pld	W	D	L	GF	GA	GD	Pts	Qualification
1	Tasaki Perule FC	4	4	0	0	14	1	+13	12	2nd Stage:1-4 Playoff
2	Iga FC Kunoichi	4	3	0	1	10	3	+7	9	2nd Stage:1-4 Playoff
3	Takarazuka Bunnys Ladies SC	4	1	1	2	3	5	−2	4	2nd Stage:5-11 Playoff
4	Speranza FC Takatsuki	4	1	1	2	7	12	−5	4	2nd Stage:5-11 Playoff
5	Renaissance Kumamoto FC	4	0	0	4	3	16	−13	0	2nd Stage:5-11 Playoff

Source: RSSSF

== Second stage ==
=== Championship playoff ===
Pos	Team	Pld	W	D	L	GF	GA	GD	Pts	Qualification
1	Nippon TV Beleza	6	4	2	0	6	2	+4	14	Champions
2	Tasaki Perule FC	6	4	1	1	11	4	+7	13	
3	Saitama Reinas FC	6	1	1	4	3	8	−5	4	
4	Iga FC Kunoichi	6	1	0	5	2	8	−6	3	

Source: RSSSF

=== Position playoff ===
Pos	Team	Pld	W	D	L	GF	GA	GD	Pts
5	Takarazuka Bunnys Ladies SC	6	5	0	1	18	7	+11	15
6	Speranza FC Takatsuki	6	4	2	0	15	5	+10	14
7	YKK Tohoku LSC Flappers	6	3	2	1	19	4	+15	11
8	AS Elfen Sayama FC	6	2	1	3	14	12	+2	7
9	JEF United Ichihara Ladies	6	0	4	2	9	18	−9	4
10	Shimizudaihachi SC	6	1	1	4	10	26	−16	4
11	Renaissance Kumamoto FC	6	0	2	4	4	17	−13	2

Source: RSSSF

== League awards ==
=== Best player ===
Player	Club
(Japan) Tomoe Kato	Nippon TV Beleza

=== Top scorers ===
Rank	Scorer	Club	Goals
1	(Japan) Mio Otani	Tasaki Perule FC	5+6

=== Best eleven ===
Pos	Player	Club
GK	(Japan) Nozomi Yamago	Saitama Reinas FC
DF	(Japan) Nana Fujii	Nippon TV Beleza
DF	(Japan) Yuka Miyazaki	Iga FC Kunoichi
DF	(Japan) Yasuyo Yamagishi	Iga FC Kunoichi
DF	(Japan) Hiromi Isozaki	Tasaki Perule F.C.
MF	(Japan) Naoko Kawakami	Tasaki Perule FC
MF	(Japan) Kanako Ito	Nippon TV Beleza
MF	(Japan) Tomoe Sakai	Nippon TV Beleza
FW	(Japan) Shinobu Ono	Nippon TV Beleza
FW	(Japan) Mio Otani	Tasaki Perule FC
FW	(Japan) Kozue Ando	Saitama Reinas FC

=== Best young player ===
Player	Club
(Japan) Kozue Ando	Saitama Reinas FC

== See also ==
- Empress's Cup
