= 2001 L.League =

Japanese women's football league season

L. League
- Season: 2001
- Champions: Nippon TV Beleza; 6th L. League title
- Top goalscorer: Mio Otani (15 goals)

Statistics of L. League in the 2001 season. Nippon TV Beleza won the championship.

== First stage ==
=== East ===
Pos	Team	Pld	W	D	L	GF	GA	GD	Pts	Qualification
1	Nippon TV Beleza	8	8	0	0	52	2	+50	24	2nd Stage:1-4 Playoff
2	YKK Tohoku LSC Flappers	8	4	1	3	24	10	+14	13	2nd Stage:1-4 Playoff
3	Urawa Reinas FC	8	4	1	3	13	20	−7	13	2nd Stage:5-10 Playoff
4	JEF United Ichihara Ladies	8	1	2	5	8	30	−22	5	2nd Stage:5-10 Playoff
5	Shimizudaihachi SC	8	0	2	6	7	42	−35	2	2nd Stage:5-10 Playoff

Source: RSSSF

=== West ===
Pos	Team	Pld	W	D	L	GF	GA	GD	Pts	Qualification
1	Tasaki Perule FC	8	7	1	0	32	3	+29	22	2nd Stage:1-4 Playoff
2	Iga FC Kunoichi	8	6	1	1	20	3	+17	19	2nd Stage:1-4 Playoff
3	Takarazuka Bunnys Ladies SC	8	3	1	4	10	16	−6	10	2nd Stage:5-10 Playoff
4	Speranza FC Takatsuki	8	2	1	5	10	18	−8	7	2nd Stage:5-10 Playoff
5	Renaissance Kumamoto FC	8	0	0	8	3	35	−32	0	2nd Stage:5-10 Playoff

Source: RSSSF

== Second stage ==
=== Championship Playoff ===
Pos	Team	Pld	W	D	L	GF	GA	GD	Pts	Qualification
1	Nippon TV Beleza	6	5	1	0	12	2	+10	16	Champions
2	Tasaki Perule FC	6	4	1	1	15	8	+7	13	
3	YKK Tohoku LSC Flappers	6	2	0	4	6	13	−7	6	
4	Iga FC Kunoichi	6	0	0	6	0	10	−10	0	

Source: RSSSF

=== Position playoff ===
Pos	Team	Pld	W	D	L	GF	GA	GD	Pts
5	Urawa Reinas FC	5	4	0	1	16	5	+11	12
6	Shimizudaihachi SC	5	3	1	1	9	4	+5	10
7	Speranza FC Takatsuki	5	3	0	2	10	4	+6	9
8	Takarazuka Bunnys Ladies SC	5	3	0	2	9	6	+3	9
9	JEF United Ichihara Ladies	5	1	1	3	11	14	−3	4
10	Renaissance Kumamoto FC	5	0	0	5	2	24	−22	0

Source: RSSSF

== League awards ==
=== Best player ===
Player	Club
(Japan) Tomoe Sakai	Nippon TV Beleza

=== Top scorers ===
Rank	Scorer	Club	Goals
1	(Japan) Mio Otani	Tasaki Perule FC	5+11

=== Best eleven ===
Pos	Player	Club
GK	(Japan) Nozomi Yamago	Urawa Reinas FC
DF	(Japan) Mai Nakachi	Nippon TV Beleza
DF	(Japan) Yumi Obe	YKK Tohoku LSC Flappers
DF	(Japan) Yasuyo Yamagishi	Iga FC Kunoichi
DF	(Japan) Hiromi Isozaki	Tasaki Perule FC
MF	(Japan) Yayoi Kobayashi	Nippon TV Beleza
MF	(Japan) Kanako Ito	Nippon TV Beleza
MF	(Japan) Tomoe Sakai	Nippon TV Beleza
FW	(Japan) Shinobu Ono	Nippon TV Beleza
FW	(Japan) Mio Otani	Tasaki Perule FC
FW	(Japan) Shoko Mikami	Tasaki Perule FC

=== Best young player ===
Player	Club
(Japan) Masami Inaba	Takarazuka Bunnys Ladies SC

== See also ==
- Empress's Cup
