= Mari Miyamoto =

Japanese footballer

Mari Miyamoto 宮本 真理
Personal information
- Full name: Mari Miyamoto
- Place of birth: Japan
- Position: Goalkeeper

Senior career*
Years	Team	Apps	(Gls)
- OKI FC Winds

International career
1999	Japan	1	(0)
- * Club domestic league appearances and goals

Mari Miyamoto (宮本 真理, Miyamoto Mari) is a former Japanese football player. She played for Japan national team.

== Club career ==
Miyamoto played for OKI FC Winds.

== National team career ==
In November 1999, Miyamoto was selected Japan national team for 1999 AFC Championship. At this competition, on November 12, she debuted against Nepal.

== National team statistics ==
Japan national team
Year	Apps	Goals
1999	1	0
Total	1	0
