= Tomoe Kato =

Japanese footballer (born 1978)

Tomoe Kato 加藤 與惠
Personal information
- Full name: Tomoe Kato
- Date of birth: May 27, 1978 (age 48)
- Place of birth: Tokyo, Japan
- Height: 1.58 m (5 ft 2 in)
- Position: Midfielder

Senior career*
Years	Team	Apps	(Gls)
1993–2008	Nippon TV Beleza	246	(22)
Total		246	(22)

International career
1997–2008	Japan	114	(8)
Medal record
Nippon TV Beleza
Winner	Nadeshiko League	1993
Winner	Nadeshiko League	2000
Winner	Nadeshiko League	2001
Winner	Nadeshiko League	2002
Winner	Nadeshiko League	2005
Winner	Nadeshiko League	2006
Winner	Nadeshiko League	2007
Winner	Nadeshiko League	2008
Runner-up	Nadeshiko League	1994
Runner-up	Nadeshiko League	1997
Runner-up	Nadeshiko League	1998
Runner-up	Nadeshiko League	1999
Runner-up	Nadeshiko League	2003
Runner-up	Nadeshiko League	2004
Winner	Nadeshiko League Cup	1996
Winner	Nadeshiko League Cup	1999
Winner	Nadeshiko League Cup	2007
Runner-up	Nadeshiko League Cup	1997
Winner	Empress's Cup	1993
Winner	Empress's Cup	1997
Winner	Empress's Cup	2000
Winner	Empress's Cup	2004
Winner	Empress's Cup	2005
Winner	Empress's Cup	2007
Winner	Empress's Cup	2008
Runner-up	Empress's Cup	1996
Runner-up	Empress's Cup	2002
Runner-up	Empress's Cup	2003
Representing Japan
AFC Women's Asian Cup
Bronze medal – third place	1997 China
Bronze medal – third place	2008 Vietnam
Asian Games
Silver medal – second place	2006 Doha	Team
Bronze medal – third place	1998 Bangkok	Team
Bronze medal – third place	2002 Busan	Team
- * Club domestic league appearances and goals

Tomoe Kato (加藤 與惠, Katō Tomoe; born May 27, 1978) (former name; Tomoe Sakai, 酒井 與惠) is a former Japanese football player. She played for Japan national team.

== Club career ==
Kato was born in Tokyo on May 27, 1978. She played for Nippon TV Beleza from 1993 to 2008. The club won L.League championship 8 times. She played 246 matches in L.League. She was selected MVP awards 2 times in 2001 and 2002. She was also selected Best Eleven for 12 years in a row (1996-2007).

== National team career ==
On June 8, 1997, when Kato was 19 years old, she debuted for Japan national team against China. She was a member of Japan for 1999, 2003, 2007 World Cup, 2004 and 2008 Summer Olympics. She played 114 games and scored 8 goals for Japan until 2008.

== Personal life ==
Kato got married and changed her name to Tomoe Kato (加藤 與惠) from Tomoe Sakai (酒井 與惠) in November 2007.

== National team statistics ==
Japan national team
Year	Apps	Goals
1997	7	0
1998	9	0
1999	13	0
2000	1	0
2001	4	0
2002	9	0
2003	14	2
2004	11	0
2005	9	1
2006	16	2
2007	17	2
2008	4	1
Total	114	8

== International goals ==
No.	Date	Venue	Opponent	Score	Result	Competition
1.	9 June 2003	Rajamangala Stadium, Bangkok, Thailand	Philippines	14–0	15–0	2003 AFC Women's Championship
2.	11 June 2003	Rajamangala Stadium, Bangkok, Thailand	Guam	1–0	7–0	2003 AFC Women's Championship
5.	30 November 2006	Grand Hamad Stadium, Doha, Qatar	Jordan	12–0	13–0	2006 Asian Games
6.	7 April 2007	Japan National Stadium, Tokyo, Japan	Vietnam	2–0	2–0	2008 Summer Olympics qualification
7.	4 August 2007	Lạch Tray Stadium, Hải Phòng, Vietnam	Vietnam	2–0	2–0	2008 Summer Olympics qualification
8.	31 May 2008	Thống Nhất Stadium, Ho Chi Minh City, Vietnam	Chinese Taipei	8–0	11–0	2008 AFC Women's Asian Cup
