= Kozue Ando =

Japanese football player (born 1982)

Kozue Ando 安藤 梢
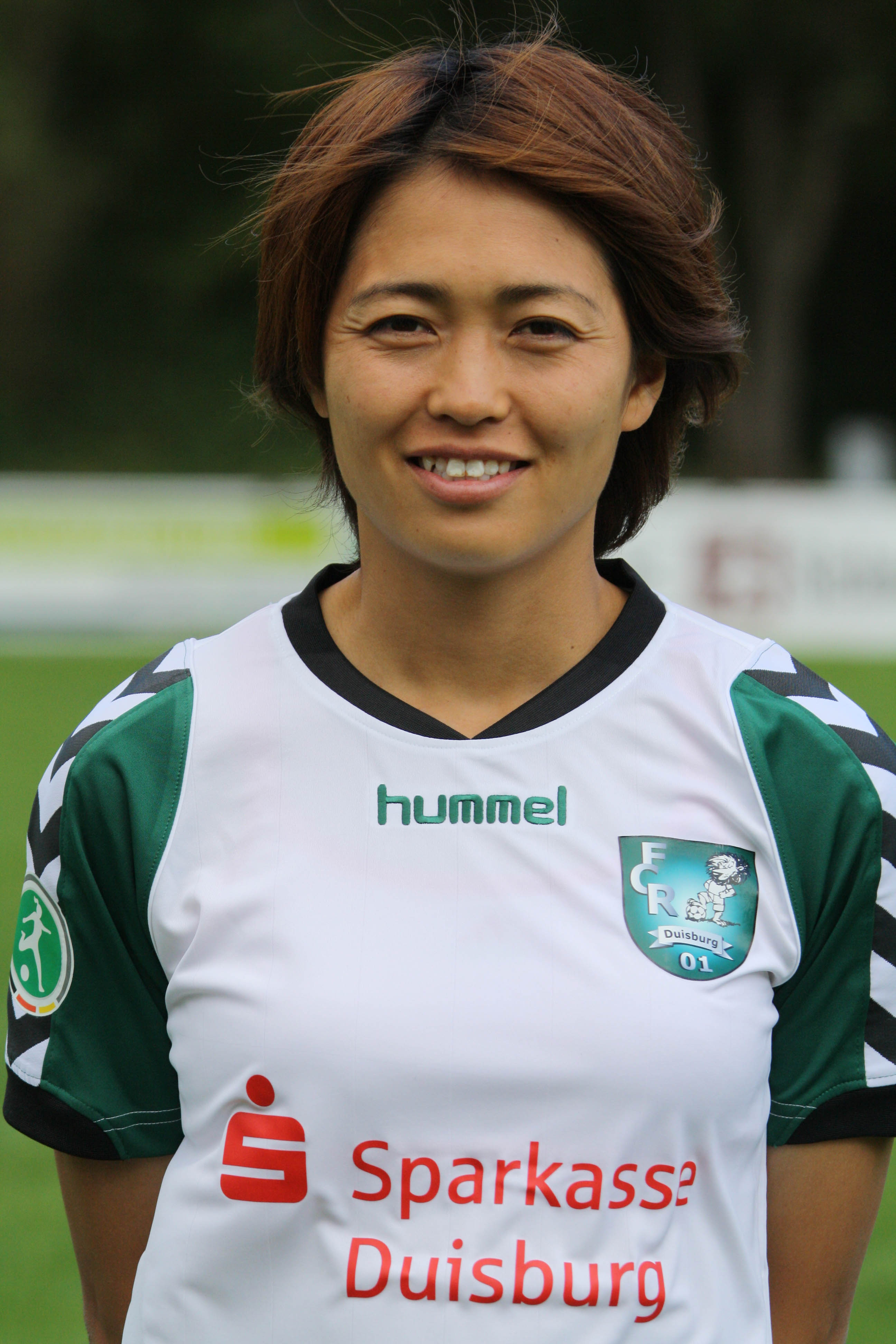
- Ando with Duisburg in 2011

Personal information
- Full name: Kozue Ando
- Date of birth: 9 July 1982 (age 44)
- Place of birth: Utsunomiya, Tochigi, Japan
- Height: 1.65 m (5 ft 5 in)
- Position: Forward

Team information
- Current team: Urawa Red Diamonds
- Number: 10

Youth career
- 1998–2000: Utsunomiya Women's High School

College career
Years	Team	Apps	(Gls)
2001	University of Tsukuba		

Senior career*
Years	Team	Apps	(Gls)
2002–2009	Urawa Reds	146	(98)
2010–2012	Duisburg	58	(19)
2013–2015	Frankfurt	52	(16)
2015–2017	Essen	35	(5)
2017–	Urawa Red Diamonds	46	(9)
Total		314	(140)

International career
1999–2015	Japan	126	(19)
Medal record
Urawa Reds
Winner	Nadeshiko League	2004
Winner	Nadeshiko League	2009
Runner-up	Nadeshiko League	2006
Runner-up	Nadeshiko League Cup	2007
Runner-up	Nadeshiko League Cup	2017
Runner-up	Empress's Cup	2004
Runner-up	Empress's Cup	2009
Representing Japan
Olympic Games
Silver medal – second place	2012 London	Team
FIFA Women's World Cup
Gold medal – first place	2011 Germany
Silver medal – second place	2015 Canada
AFC Women's Asian Cup
Bronze medal – third place	2008 Vietnam
Bronze medal – third place	2010 China
Asian Games
Silver medal – second place	2006 Doha	Team
- * Club domestic league appearances and goals as of 31 December 2018

Kozue Ando (安藤 梢, Andō Kozue; born 9 July 1982) is a Japanese football player. Ando currently plays club football for the Urawa Reds Diamonds. She previously played for the Japan national team before retiring in 2015.

== Club career ==
Ando was born in Utsunomiya on 9 July 1982. In 2002, when she was a University of Tsukuba student, she left university club and joined Saitama Reinas FC (later Urawa Reds). In 2002 season, she scored 10 goals and was selected at the Young Player Awards. She became top scorer and she was selected MVP awards in 2004 and 2009. She also featured in the Best Eleven 6 times. From 2010, she played for German Bundesliga clubs; Duisburg, Frankfurt and Essen. At Frankfurt, she won UEFA Women's Champions League in 2014–15 season. In June 2017, she returned to Japan and joined Urawa Reds.

== National team career ==
In June 1999, when Ando was 16 years old, she was selected for the Japan national team for the 1999 FIFA Women's World Cup. At this competition, on 26 June, she debuted against Norway. She played in the World Cup four times and in the Summer Olympics three times. She was a member of the team that defeated the United States in a penalty shootout in the final to win the 2011 World Cup; Ando started the final. She was also part of the Japanese team which won the silver medal at the 2012 Summer Olympics and second place at the 2015 World Cup. At the 2015 World Cup, in the first match against Switzerland, she got a penalty kick, but she fractured her left ankle at that moment. This match was her last as part of the Japan national team. She played 126 games and scored 19 goals for Japan.

== Education ==
Ando graduated from Utsunomiya Women's High School. She earned a PhD in Physical Education, Health and Sport Sciences from University of Tsukuba in May 2018.

== Club statistics ==
As of 12 May 2013

Club	Season	League		Cup		League Cup		Continental^{1}		Total	
Club	Season	Apps	Goals	Apps	Goals	Apps	Goals	Apps	Goals	Apps	Goals
Urawa Reds	2002	11	10			-		-			
Urawa Reds	2003	20	8			-		-			
Urawa Reds	2004	14	12			-		-			
Urawa Reds	2005	21	13	4	7	-		-		25	20
Urawa Reds	2006	17	6	3	2	-		-		20	8
Urawa Reds	2007	21	18	3	2	2	1	-		26	21
Urawa Reds	2008	21	13	2	1	-		-		23	14
Urawa Reds	2009	21	18	4	1	-		-		25	19
Urawa Reds	Total	146	98			2	1	-			
Duisburg	2009–10	10	6	3	1	-		2	0	15	7
Duisburg	2010–11	20	5	3	1	4	2	10	1	37	9
Duisburg	2011–12	17	6	2	3	-		-		19	9
Duisburg	2012–13	11	2	2	1	-		-		13	3
Duisburg	Total	58	19	10	6	4	2	12	1	84	28
Frankfurt	2012–13	10	4			-					
Frankfurt	Total	10	4								
Career total		214	121			6	3	12	1		

^{1}Includes UEFA Champions League.

== National team statistics ==
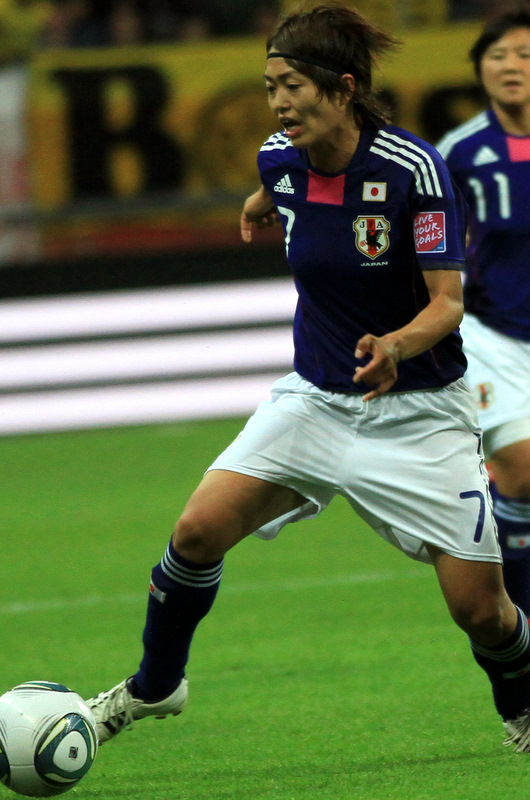
Ando playing at the 2011 World Cup

Japan national team
Year	Apps	Goals
1999	1	0
2000	5	0
2001	0	0
2002	5	0
2003	1	2
2004	6	1
2005	9	1
2006	16	3
2007	9	0
2008	16	3
2009	3	1
2010	8	6
2011	18	0
2012	13	0
2013	5	1
2014	4	0
2015	7	1
Total	126	19

== International goals ==
No.	Date	Venue	Opponent	Score	Result	Competition
1.	19 March 2003	Bangkok, Thailand	Thailand	?–0	9–0	Friendly
2.	19 March 2003	Bangkok, Thailand	Thailand	?–0	9–0	Friendly
3.	22 April 2004	Tokyo, Japan	Thailand	2–0	6–0	2004 Summer Olympics qualification
5.	30 July 2006	Adelaide, Australia	North Korea	1–3	2–3	2006 AFC Women's Asian Cup
7.	4 December 2006	Al-Rayyan, Qatar	Thailand	4–0	4–0	2006 Asian Games
8.	18 February 2008	Chongqing, China	North Korea	1–0	3–2	2008 EAFF Women's Football Championship
9.	31 May 2008	Hồ Chí Minh City, Vietnam	Chinese Taipei	3–0	11–0	2008 AFC Women's Asian Cup
10.	2 June 2008	Hồ Chí Minh City, Vietnam	Australia	1–0	3–1	2008 AFC Women's Asian Cup
11.	22 May 2010	Chengdu, China	Thailand	4–0	4–0	2010 AFC Women's Asian Cup
12.	24 May 2010	Chengdu, China	North Korea	1–0	2–1	2010 AFC Women's Asian Cup
13.	30 May 2010	Chengdu, China	China	1–0	2–0	2010 AFC Women's Asian Cup
18.	20 July 2013	Seoul, South Korea	China	1–0	2–0	2013 EAFF Women's East Asian Cup
19.	4 March 2015	Parchal, Portugal	Denmark	1–1	1–2	2015 Algarve Cup

== Honors ==
=== Club ===
Urawa Reds Ladies

- L.League: 2004, 2009

FCR 2001 Duisburg

- DFB-Pokal: 2009–10

Frankfurt

- DFB-Pokal: 2013–14
- UEFA Women's Champions League: 2014–15

=== National team ===
- FIFA Women's World Cup: 2011

=== Individual ===
- L.League

MVP: 2004, 2009
Top Scorers: 2004, 2009
Best Eleven (6): 2002, 2004, 2005, 2007, 2008, 2009
Best Young Player: 2002
