= Nozomi Yamago =

Japanese association football player

Nozomi Yamago 山郷 のぞみ
Personal information
- Full name: Nozomi Yamago
- Date of birth: January 16, 1975 (age 51)
- Place of birth: Saitama, Saitama, Japan
- Height: 1.63 m (5 ft 4 in)
- Position: Goalkeeper

Youth career
- 1990–1992: Honjo Women's High School

Senior career*
Years	Team	Apps	(Gls)
1993–2001	Iga FC Kunoichi	115	(0)
2002–2004	Saitama Reinas FC	47	(0)
2005	California Storm		
2005–2012	Urawa Reds	123	(0)
2013–2014	AS Elfen Saitama	41	(0)
Total		326	(0)

International career
1997–2011	Japan	96	(0)
Medal record
Iga FC Kunoichi
Winner	Nadeshiko League	1995
Winner	Nadeshiko League	1999
Runner-up	Nadeshiko League	1996
Runner-up	Nadeshiko League	2000
Winner	Nadeshiko League Cup	1997
Winner	Nadeshiko League Cup	1998
Runner-up	Nadeshiko League Cup	1996
Runner-up	Nadeshiko League Cup	1999
Winner	Empress's Cup	1995
Winner	Empress's Cup	1998
Winner	Empress's Cup	2001
Runner-up	Empress's Cup	1993
Runner-up	Empress's Cup	1994
Runner-up	Empress's Cup	1997
Runner-up	Empress's Cup	1999
Urawa Reds
Winner	Nadeshiko League	2004
Winner	Nadeshiko League	2009
Runner-up	Nadeshiko League	2006
Runner-up	Nadeshiko League	2010
Runner-up	Nadeshiko League Cup	2007
Runner-up	Nadeshiko League Cup	2010
Runner-up	Empress's Cup	2004
Runner-up	Empress's Cup	2009
Runner-up	Empress's Cup	2010
Representing Japan
FIFA Women's World Cup
Gold medal – first place	2011 Germany
AFC Women's Asian Cup
Silver medal – second place	2001 Chinese Taipei
Bronze medal – third place	1997 China
Bronze medal – third place	2008 Vietnam
Bronze medal – third place	2010 China
Asian Games
Gold medal – first place	2010 Guangzhou	Team
Silver medal – second place	2006 Doha	Team
Bronze medal – third place	1998 Bangkok	Team
Bronze medal – third place	2002 Busan	Team
- * Club domestic league appearances and goals

Nozomi Yamago (山郷 のぞみ, Yamagō Nozomi; born January 16, 1975) is a Japanese former football player. She played for the Japan women's national football team as a goalkeeper.

== Club career ==
Yamago was born in Saitama on January 16, 1975. After graduating from high school, she joined Prima Ham FC Kunoichi (later Iga FC Kunoichi) in 1993. In 2002, she moved to her local club Saitama Reinas FC (later Urawa Reds). In 2005, she moved to Women's Premier Soccer League club California Storm. At the end of the 2005 season, she returned to Urawa Reds in September. In 2012, she moved to AS Elfen Saitama. She retired in 2014. She was selected to the Nadeshiko League Best XI 10 times (1996, 1999, 2001, 2002, 2003, 2004, 2007, 2008, 2009 and 2010).

== National team career ==
On June 15, 1997, Yamago debuted for the Japan national team against China. She was a member of Japan squads at the 1999, 2003, 2007 and 2011 Women's World Cups, as well as the 2004 Summer Olympics. At the 2011 World Cup, Japan won the championship. She played 96 games for Japan until 2011.

== National team statistics ==
Japan national team
Year	Apps	Goals
1997	6	0
1998	8	0
1999	10	0
2000	4	0
2001	10	0
2002	8	0
2003	15	0
2004	10	0
2005	5	0
2006	4	0
2007	3	0
2008	3	0
2009	2	0
2010	7	0
2011	1	0
Total	96	0

== Honors ==
- FIFA Women's World Cup

Champion (1): 2011

- Football at the Asian Games

Gold Medal (1): 2010
