= 2002 Empress's Cup =

Tournament details
- Country: Japan

Final positions
- Champions: Tasaki Perule FC
- Runners-up: Nippon TV Beleza
- Semifinalists: Saitama Reinas FC; YKK Tohoku LSC Flappers

Statistics of Empress's Cup in the 2002 season.

== Overview ==
It was contested by 21 teams, and Tasaki Perule FC won the championship.

== Results ==
=== 1st round ===
- Fukuoka Jogakuin FC Anclas 0-4 Ohara Gakuen JaSRA
- Ragazza FC Takatsuki Speranza 1-2 Nippon Sport Science University
- Iga FC Fraulein 2-5 Okayama Yunogo Belle
- Nippon TV Menina 3-0 Seiwa Gakuen High School
- J. Sea Gull 2-0 Kochi JFC Rosa

=== 2nd round ===
- Nippon TV Beleza 1-0 Ohara Gakuen JaSRA
- JEF United Ichihara 3-1 AS Elfen Sayama FC
- Takarazuka Bunnys 1-3 Nippon Sport Science University
- Okayama Yunogo Belle 1-4 Saitama Reinas FC
- Iga FC Kunoichi 2-1 Nippon TV Menina
- Shimizudaihachi SC 0-4 YKK Tohoku LSC Flappers
- Speranza FC Takatsuki 8-0 Renaissance Kumamoto FC
- J. Sea Gull 0-4 Tasaki Perule FC

=== Quarterfinals ===
- Nippon TV Beleza 4-0 JEF United Ichihara
- Nippon Sport Science University 0-2 Saitama Reinas FC
- Iga FC Kunoichi 1-1 (pen 0-3) YKK Tohoku LSC Flappers
- Speranza FC Takatsuki 0-1 Tasaki Perule FC

=== Semifinals ===
- Nippon TV Beleza 1-0 Saitama Reinas FC
- YKK Tohoku LSC Flappers 1-3 Tasaki Perule FC

=== Final ===
- Nippon TV Beleza 0-1 Tasaki Perule FC

Tasaki Perule FC won the championship.
