= 2003 Empress's Cup =

Japan Women's Soccer Championship 2003

Tournament details
- Country: Japan

Final positions
- Champions: Tasaki Perule FC
- Runners-up: Nippon TV Beleza
- Semifinalists: Saitama Reinas FC; Iga FC Kunoichi Mie

Statistics of Empress's Cup in the 2003 season.

== Overview ==
It was contested by 23 teams, and Tasaki Perule FC won the championship.

== Results ==
=== 1st round ===
- Honda FC 1-6 Kanagawa University
- Albirex Niigata 2-1 Renaissance Kumamoto FC
- Bucchigiri FC 0-8 AS Elfen Sayama FC
- Hokkaido Bunkyo University Meisei High School 4-1 Kibi International University
- JEF United Ichihara 1-5 Nippon Sport Science University
- Shimizudaihachi SC 0-5 Hinomoto Gakuen High School
- Tokiwagi Gakuken High School 1-2 Hoo High School

=== 2nd round ===
- Tasaki Perule FC 5-0 Kanagawa University
- Albirex Niigata 0-2 Speranza FC Takatsuki
- YKK Tohoku LSC Flappers 4-0 AS Elfen Sayama FC
- Hokkaido Bunkyo University Meisei High School 0-7 Saitama Reinas FC
- Nippon TV Beleza 5-0 Nippon Sport Science University
- Hinomoto Gakuen High School 1-3 Ohara Gakuen JaSRA
- Okayama Yunogo Belle 3-1 Takarazuka Bunnys
- Hoo High School 1-5 Iga FC Kunoichi

=== Quarterfinals ===
- Tasaki Perule FC 3-0 Speranza FC Takatsuki
- YKK Tohoku LSC Flappers 0-2 Saitama Reinas FC
- Nippon TV Beleza 3-1 Ohara Gakuen JaSRA
- Okayama Yunogo Belle 1-5 Iga FC Kunoichi

=== Semifinals ===
- Tasaki Perule FC 1-0 Saitama Reinas FC
- Nippon TV Beleza 3-0 Iga FC Kunoichi

=== Final ===
- Tasaki Perule FC 2-2 (pen 5-3) Nippon TV Beleza

Tasaki Perule FC won the championship.
