= 2000 Empress's Cup =

Tournament details
- Country: Japan

Final positions
- Champions: Nippon TV Beleza
- Runners-up: Tasaki Perule FC
- Semifinalists: Speranza FC Takatsuki; Iga FC Kunoichi

Statistics of Empress's Cup in the 2000 season.

== Overview ==
It was contested by 19 teams, and Nippon TV Beleza won the championship.

== Results ==
=== 1st round ===
- Seiwa Gakuen High School 1-0 Kamimura Gakuen High School
- Sapporo Linda 0-2 Shimizudaihachi SC
- Saibi High School 0-7 Nippon Sport Science University

=== 2nd round ===
- Nippon TV Beleza 8-0 Seiwa Gakuen High School
- Renaissance Kumamoto FC 0-3 JEF United Ichihara
- Speranza FC Takatsuki 7-0 Nawashiro Ladies
- YKK Tohoku LSC Flappers 5-0 Nippon TV Menina
- Tasaki Perule FC 10-1 Shimizudaihachi SC
- Osaka University of Health and Sport Sciences 0-1 Urawa Reinas FC
- Takarazuka Bunnys 3-0 Scramble FC
- Nippon Sport Science University 0-3 Iga FC Kunoichi

=== Quarterfinals ===
- Nippon TV Beleza 3-0 JEF United Ichihara
- Speranza FC Takatsuki 2-1 YKK Tohoku LSC Flappers
- Tasaki Perule FC 4-0 Urawa Reinas FC
- Takarazuka Bunnys 0-4 Iga FC Kunoichi

=== Semifinals ===
- Nippon TV Beleza 5-1 Speranza FC Takatsuki
- Tasaki Perule FC 1-0 Iga FC Kunoichi

=== Final ===
- Nippon TV Beleza 2-1 Tasaki Perule FC

Nippon TV Beleza won the championship.
