= Shimizudaihachi Pleiades =

Shimizudaihachi Pleiades 清水第八プレアデス
- Full name: Shimizudaihachi Pleiades
- Nickname(s): Shimizudaihachi
- Founded: 1978
- Manager: Kyoko Yamanashi
- League: Tokai.League Div.1 / Div.4
- 2014: 16th (Challenge.League) Div.2
- Website: http://www.sdh-1978.com/index.htm
Home colours	Away colours

Shimizudaihachi Pleiades (清水第八プレアデス) is a women's football club playing in Japan's football league, Tokai.League Div.1. Its hometown is Shimizu.

== Squad ==
=== Current squad ===
As of 7 June 2015 Note: Flags indicate national team as defined under FIFA eligibility rules; some limited exceptions apply. Players may hold more than one non-FIFA nationality.

No.	Pos.	Nation	Player
1	GK	(Japan) JPN	Aya Tsuchiya
2	DF	(Japan) JPN	Sayumi Baba
3	DF	(Japan) JPN	Mio Hirukawa
4	DF	(Japan) JPN	Chisato Hatakama
5	MF	(Japan) JPN	Wakana Kanashiro
6	MF	(Japan) JPN	Tomoko Miyagawa
7	MF	(Japan) JPN	Natsuki Matsuda
8	MF	(Japan) JPN	Kotomi Yamaki
9	FW	(Japan) JPN	Haruka Otawa
10	FW	(Japan) JPN	Naomi Suzuki

No.	Pos.	Nation	Player
11	FW	(Japan) JPN	Sayaka Kajikawa
12	DF	(Japan) JPN	Megumi Haruta
13	DF	(Japan) JPN	Nanami Isobe
14	MF	(Japan) JPN	Aki Sugiura
15	GK	(Japan) JPN	Haruna Mochizuki
16	MF	(Japan) JPN	Airi Sakai
17	FW	(Japan) JPN	Yuuka Endo
18	DF	(Japan) JPN	Norie Nishigaya
19	MF	(Japan) JPN	Yui Kondo

== Honors ==
=== Domestic competitions ===
- Empress's Cup All-Japan Women's Football Tournament
  - 'Champions (7) : 1980, 1981, 1982, 1983, 1984, 1985, 1986
  - Runners-up (2) : 1979, 1987

== Results ==
Season	Domestic League				National Cup	League Cup	League Note
Season	League	Level	Place	Tms.	National Cup	League Cup	League Note
1979	–	–	–	–	Runners-up	–	
1980	–	–	–	–	Champion	–	
1981	–	–	–	–	Champion	–	
1982	–	–	–	–	Champion	–	
1983	–	–	–	–	Champion	–	
1984	–	–	–	–	Champion	–	
1985	Shizuoka	2			Champion	–	
1986	Shizuoka	2			Champion	–	
1987	Shizuoka	2			Runners-up	–	
1988	Shizuoka	2			Semi-finals	–	
1989	Shizuoka	2			1st Stage	–	
1990	Shizuoka	2			1st Stage	–	
1991	Shizuoka	2			DNQ	–	
1992	JLSL Challenge	2	3rd	4	DNQ	–	
1993	JLSL Challenge	2	3rd	4	2nd Stage	–	
1994	JLSL Challenge	2	2nd	3	1st Stage	–	
1995	JLSL Challenge	2	3rd	3	DNQ	–	
1996	Shizuoka	3			2nd Stage	–	
1997	Shizuoka	3			2nd Stage	–	
1998	Shizuoka	3			1st Stage	–	
1999	Shizuoka	3			DNQ	–	
2000	Tokai	2			2nd Stage	–	Promoted for L.League
2001	L	1	6th	10	Quarter-finals	–	
2002	L	1	10th	11	2nd Stage	–	
2003	L	1	11th	13	1st Stage	–	Relegated to Div.2
2004	L2	2	6th	6	2nd Stage	–	
2005	L2	2	6th	7	1st Stage	–	
2006	Nadeshiko; Div.2	2	7th	8	2nd Stage	–	
2007	Nadeshiko; Div.2	2	7th	8	2nd Stage	Group League	
2008	Nadeshiko; Div.2	2	7th	9	2nd Stage	–	
2009	Nadeshiko; Div.2	2	4th	8	2nd Stage	–	
2010	Challenge(East)	2	6th	6	2nd Stage	–	Relegated to Regional League
2011	Tokai	3	1st	10	DNQ	–	
2012	Tokai	3	4th	12	DNQ	–	Promoted for L.League
2013	Challenge	2	14th	16	1st Stage	–	
2014	Challenge	2	16th	16	1st Stage	–	Relegated to Regional League
2015	Tokai Div.1	4	6th	6	DNQ	–	
2016	Tokai Div.2	5	1st	6	DNQ	–	
2017	Tokai Div.1	4		6	DNQ	–	

== Transition of team name ==
- Shimizudaihachi SC : 1978 – 2006
- Shimizudaihachi Pleiades : 2007 – Present
