= Bunnys Gunma FC White Star =

- Nickname(s): Bunnys
- Founded: 2007, as White Star Takasaki Hossoku
- Ground: Yamashiro Park Taiyogaoka Stadium
- Capacity: 7,000
- Manager: Osamu Yamada
- League: Nadeshiko League Div.2
- 2024: Nadeshiko League Div.1, 12th of 12
- Website: https://whitestar-sportsclub.com/
| Home colours | Away colours |

Bunnys Gunma FC White Star (バニーズ群馬FCホワイトスター) is a women's football club playing in Japan's football league, Nadeshiko League Division 2. Its hometown is the city of Maebashi.

== Squad ==
=== Current squad ===
As of 2 May 2022.

Note: Flags indicate national team as defined under FIFA eligibility rules; some limited exceptions apply. Players may hold more than one non-FIFA nationality.

| No. | Pos. | Nation | Player |
|---|---|---|---|
| 1 | GK | (Japan) JPN | Misa Takagi |
| 2 | DF | (Japan) JPN | Asumi Ikeda |
| 3 | DF | (Japan) JPN | Misaki Hata |
| 4 | DF | (Japan) JPN | Mana Minami |
| 5 | MF | (Japan) JPN | Sayuri Oshima |
| 6 | MF | (Japan) JPN | Yumi Yamamoto |
| 7 | MF | (Japan) JPN | Yuka Sawada |
| 8 | DF | (Japan) JPN | Yumiko Shibuya |
| 9 | FW | (Japan) JPN | Yukari Tanihara |
| 10 | MF | (Japan) JPN | Nozomi Matsuda |
| 11 | FW | (Japan) JPN | Yuka Yoshino |
| 13 | FW | (Japan) JPN | Aoi Kushige |
| 14 | FW | (Japan) JPN | Itsuki Nishikawa |

| No. | Pos. | Nation | Player |
|---|---|---|---|
| 15 | FW | (Japan) JPN | Rena Hanazaki |
| 16 | MF | (Japan) JPN | Ai Yoshizawa |
| 17 | FW | (Japan) JPN | Masami Okawa |
| 18 | GK | (Japan) JPN | Saki Shinomaru |
| 19 | MF | (Japan) JPN | Natsuki Nagai |
| 20 | MF | (Japan) JPN | Yuu Yamashita |
| 21 | GK | (Japan) JPN | Misaki Gotyo |
| 22 | DF | (Japan) JPN | Ryo Akiyama |
| 23 | MF | (Japan) JPN | Mika Momii |
| 24 | MF | (Japan) JPN | Saori Oyamada |
| 25 | FW | (Japan) JPN | Kasumi Masuda |
| 26 | MF | (Japan) JPN | Nanase Asano |
| 28 | DF | (Japan) JPN | Natsumi Kuwahara |

== Results ==
| Season | Domestic League | | | | National Cup | League Cup |
| Season | League | Level | Place | Tms. | National Cup | League Cup |
|---|---|---|---|---|---|---|
| 1991 | JLSL | 1 | 8th | 10 | Quarter-finals | – |
| 1992 | JLSL | 1 | 6th | 10 | Quarter-finals | – |
| 1993 | JLSL | 1 | 7th | 10 | Quarter-finals | – |
| 1994 | L | 1 | 9th | 10 | 2nd Stage | – |
| 1995 | L | 1 | 10th | 10 | 2nd Stage | – |
| 1996 | L | 1 | 6th | 10 | Quarter-finals | Group Stage |
| 1997 | L | 1 | 10th | 10 | 2nd Stage | Group Stage |
| 1998 | L | 1 | 6th | 10 | Quarter-finals | Group Stage |
| 1999 | L | 1 | 6th | 8 | Quarter-finals | Group Stage |
| 2000 | L | 1 | 7th | 9 | Quarter-finals | – |
| 2001 | L | 1 | 8th | 10 | Quarter-finals | – |
| 2002 | L | 1 | 5th | 11 | 2nd Stage | – |
| 2003 | L | 1 | 9th | 13 | 2nd Stage | – |
| 2004 | L1 | 1 | 6th | 8 | Quarter-finals | – |
| 2005 | L1 | 1 | 8th | 8 | 1st Stage | – |
| 2006 | Nadeshiko; Div.2 | 2 | 6th | 8 | 3rd Stage | – |
| 2007 | Nadeshiko; Div.2 | 2 | 6th | 8 | 2nd Stage | Group Stage |
| 2008 | Nadeshiko; Div.2 | 2 | 6th | 9 | 3rd Stage | – |
| 2009 | Nadeshiko; Div.2 | 2 | 6th | 8 | 1st Stage | – |
| 2010 | Challenge (West) | 2 | 2nd | 6 | 1st Stage | – |
| 2011 | Challenge (West) | 2 | 5th | 6 | DNQ | – |
| 2012 | Challenge | 2 | 10th | 12 | DNQ | – |
| 2013 | Challenge | 2 | 12th | 16 | DNQ | – |
| 2014 | Challenge | 2 | 15th | 16 | DNQ | – |
| 2015 | Challenge(West) | 3 | 4th | 6 | 2nd Stage | – |
| 2016 | Challenge | 3 | 4th | 12 | 2nd Stage | – |
| 2017 | Challenge | 3 | 2nd | 12 | 2nd Stage | – |
| 2018 | Nadeshiko Div.2 | 2 | 9th | 10th | 2nd Stage | – |
| 2019 | Nadeshiko Div.2 | 2 | | | | |
| 2020 | | | | | | |
| 2021 | | | | | | |
| 2022 | | | | | | |
| 2023 | | | | | | |

== Transition of team name ==
- Asahi Kokusai Bunnys: 1991–1994
- Takarazuka Bunnys Ladies SC: 1995–2005
- Bunnys Kyoto SC: 2006–2020
- Bunnys Gunma FC White Star: 2021–present
