= Tasaki Perule FC =

Tasaki Perule FC TASAKIペルーレFC
- Full name: Tasaki Perule FC
- Nickname: Perule
- Founded: 1976
- Ground: Kakogawa Athletic Stadium; Kakogawa, Hyogo

Tasaki Perule FC (TASAKIペルーレFC, Tasaki Perure FC) was a women's football team which played in Division 1 of Japan's Nadeshiko League. It was originally founded in 1976 as the women's division of the Kobe Football Club before the involvement of Tasaki Pearl beginning in 1989. The club was disbanded in 2008 following the company's restructuring. Their final match was played that December, losing to INAC Leonessa in the semifinals of the All Japan Women's Football Championship.

== Honors ==
=== Domestic competitions ===
- Nadeshiko.League Division 1
  - Champions (1) : 2003
  - Runners-up (4) : 2001, 2002, 2005, 2007
- Empress's Cup All-Japan Women's Football Tournament
  - Champions (4) : 1999, 2002, 2003, 2006
  - Runners-up (4) : 2000, 2001, 2005, 2007
- Nadeshiko Super Cup
  - Champions (1) : 2006
  - Runners-up (1) : 2007

== Results ==
Season	Domestic League				National Cup	League Cup	League Note
Season	League	Level	Place	Tms.	National Cup	League Cup	League Note
1980	-	-	-	-	Semi-finals	-	
1981	-	-	-	-	1st Stage	-	
1982	-	-	-	-	Quarter-finals	-	
1983	-	-	-	-	Quarter-finals	-	
1984	-	-	-	-	Quarter-finals	-	
1985	-	-	-	-	Semi-finals	-	
1986	-	-	-	-	Semi-final(4th)	-	
1987	-	-	-	-	Semi-finals	-	
1988	-	-	-	-	Quarter-finals	-	
1989	JLSL	1	3rd	6	Semi-finals	-	
1990	JLSL	1	6th	6	Quarter-finals	-	
1991	JLSL	1	6th	10	Quarter-finals	-	
1992	JLSL	1	10th	10	2nd Stage	-	Relegated to Div.2
1993	JLSL Challenge	2	2nd	4	Quarter-finals	-	
1994	JLSL Challenge	2	1st	3	Quarter-finals	-	Promoted for Div.1
1995	L	1	8th	10	Quarter-finals	-	1st Stage : 8th / 2nd Stage : 3rd
1996	L	1	7th	10	Quarter-finals	Group League	1st Stage : 7th / 2nd Stage : 7th
1997	L	1	5th	10	Quarter-finals	Group League	1st Stage : 5th / 2nd Stage : 6th
1998	L	1	7th	10	Semi-finals	Group League	1st Stage : 7th / 2nd Stage : 7th
1999	L	1	3rd	8	Champion	Semi-finals(4th)	1st Stage : 2nd / 2nd Stage : 2nd
2000	L	1	3rd	9	Runners-up	-	1st Stage : (WEST)1st
2001	L	1	2nd	10	Runners-up	-	1st Stage : (WEST)1st
2002	L	1	2nd	11	Champion	-	1st Stage : (WEST)1st
2003	L	1	1st	13	Champion	-	1st Stage : (WEST)1st
2004	L1	1	3rd	8	Semi-finals	-	
2005	L1	1	2nd	8	Runners-up	-	
2006	Nadeshiko; Div.1	1	3rd	8	Champion	-	
2007	Nadeshiko; Div.1	1	2nd	8	Runners-up	Group League	
2008	Nadeshiko; Div.1	1	4th	8	Semi-finals	-	Dissolved

== Transition of team name ==
- Kobe FC Ladies : 1976 - 1988
- Tasaki-Shinju Kobe Ladies : 1989 - 1990
- Tasaki Kobe Ladies : 1991 - 1992
- Tasaki Perule FC : 1993 – 2008

== See also ==
- Japanese women's club teams
