= 1986 in Japanese football =

1986 season

Japanese football in 1986

== Japan Soccer League ==
=== Division 1 ===
Pos	Team	Pld	W	D	L	GF	GA	GD	Pts	Qualification or relegation
1	Yomiuri	22	11	7	4	35	18	+17	29	Champions
2	Nippon Kokan	22	11	7	4	30	17	+13	29	
3	Mitsubishi Motors	22	9	10	3	23	14	+9	28	
4	Furukawa Electric	22	10	6	6	26	17	+9	26	
5	Nissan	22	10	4	8	35	24	+11	24	
6	Yanmar Diesel	22	8	8	6	21	22	−1	24	
7	Mazda	22	6	11	5	17	17	0	23	
8	Fujita Engineering	22	8	6	8	24	22	+2	22	
9	Honda	22	6	8	8	20	24	−4	20	
10	Yamaha Motors	22	3	11	8	11	22	−11	17	
11	Matsushita Electric	22	5	6	11	23	38	−15	16	Relegated to Second Division
12	Hitachi	22	1	4	17	13	43	−30	6	Relegated to Second Division

=== Division 2 ===
==== First stage ====
===== East =====
Pos	Team	Pld	W	D	L	GF	GA	GD	Pts
1	Toshiba	14	10	3	1	24	7	+17	23
2	Sumitomo	14	9	3	2	36	9	+27	21
3	Kofu Club	14	6	3	5	15	15	0	15
4	Cosmo Oil	14	5	4	5	17	15	+2	14
5	ANA Yokohama	14	4	5	5	20	18	+2	13
6	Fujitsu	14	6	1	7	16	20	−4	13
7	Toho Titanium	14	4	4	6	13	19	−6	12
8	TDK	14	0	1	13	8	46	−38	1

===== West =====
Pos	Team	Pld	W	D	L	GF	GA	GD	Pts
1	Tanabe Pharmaceuticals	14	9	5	0	22	5	+17	23
2	Toyota Motors	14	9	2	3	33	15	+18	20
3	Osaka Gas	14	6	7	1	20	13	+7	19
4	Seino Transportation	14	7	2	5	14	12	+2	16
5	Nippon Steel	14	7	1	6	23	15	+8	15
6	Kyoto Prefectural Police	14	3	2	9	15	34	−19	8
7	Kawasaki Steel	14	2	2	10	16	30	−14	6
8	NTT Kansai	14	1	3	10	12	31	−19	5

==== Second stage ====
===== Promotion Group =====
Pos	Team	Pld	W	D	L	GF	GA	GD	Pts	Promotion
1	Sumitomo	14	9	4	1	20	4	+16	22	Promoted to First Division
2	Toyota Motors	14	6	4	4	19	12	+7	16	Promoted to First Division
3	Tanabe Pharmaceuticals	14	3	8	3	11	9	+2	14	
4	Seino Transportation	14	4	6	4	9	11	−2	14	
5	Toshiba	14	4	5	5	12	11	+1	13	
6	Osaka Gas	14	5	2	7	12	20	−8	12	
7	Kofu Club	14	5	1	8	12	15	−3	11	
8	Cosmo Oil	14	3	4	7	8	21	−13	10	

===== Relegation Group =====
====== East ======
Pos	Team	Pld	W	D	L	GF	GA	GD	Pts	Relegation
1	Fujitsu	6	5	1	0	37	26	+11	24	
2	ANA Yokohama	6	3	1	2	33	30	+3	20	
3	Toho Titanium	6	2	2	2	21	29	−8	16	
4	TDK	6	1	1	4	20	54	−34	11	Relegated to Regional Leagues

====== West ======
Pos	Team	Pld	W	D	L	GF	GA	GD	Pts	Relegation
1	Nippon Steel	6	4	0	2	37	22	+15	23	
2	Kawasaki Steel	6	3	1	2	29	39	−10	13	
3	NTT Kansai	6	3	0	3	25	40	−15	11	
4	Kyoto Prefectural Police	6	1	1	4	20	54	−34	11	Relegated to Regional Leagues

====== 9th-16th Place Playoff ======
Pos	East	Score	West
9–10	Fujitsu	3-3(PK4-2)	Nippon Steel
11–12	ANA Yokohama	4-2	Kawasaki Steel
13–14	Toho Titanium	3-0	NTT Kansai
15–16	TDK	5-0	Kyoto Prefectural Police

== Emperor's Cup ==
January 1, 1987

Yomiuri	2–1	Nippon Kokan
? (?) ? (?)		? (?)

National Stadium

== National team (Men) ==
=== Results ===
1986.07.25	Japan	2–1	Syria	Kuala Lumpur, Malaysia
	Matsuura 18'; Hara 63'	JFA	? (?)

1986.08.01	Japan	1–2 (a.e.t.)	Malaysia	Kuala Lumpur, Malaysia
	Hara 43'	JFA	? (?) ? (?)	Attendance: 30,000

1986.09.20	Japan	5–0	Nepal	Daejeon, South Korea
	Tsunami 9'; Hara 18', 41'; Kimura 26', 31'	JFA

1986.09.22	Japan	0–2	Iran	Daejeon, South Korea
		JFA	? (?) ? (?)

1986.09.24	Japan	0–2	Kuwait	Daejeon, South Korea
		JFA	? (?) ? (?)

1986.09.28	Japan	4–0	Bangladesh	Daejeon, South Korea
	Hara 2', 60', 72'; Tsunami 86'	JFA

=== Players statistics ===
Player	-1985	07.25	08.01	09.20	09.22	09.24	09.28	1986	Total
Hiromi Hara	56(23)	O(1)	O(1)	O(2)	O	O	O(3)	6(7)	62(30)
Kazushi Kimura	48(24)	O	O	O(2)	O	O	O	6(2)	54(26)
Hisashi Kato	45(4)	-	O	O	O	O	O	5(0)	50(4)
Satoshi Tsunami	40(0)	O	-	O(1)	O	O	O(1)	5(2)	45(2)
Akihiro Nishimura	35(2)	O	O	-	O	O	O	5(0)	40(2)
Koichi Hashiratani	27(3)	-	-	-	-	O	O	2(0)	29(3)
Yasuhiko Okudera	23(8)	-	-	O	O	O	O	4(0)	27(8)
Toshio Matsuura	12(1)	O(1)	-	O	-	O	-	3(1)	15(2)
Satoshi Tezuka	10(0)	-	O	-	O	O	O	4(0)	14(0)
Kiyotaka Matsui	10(0)	-	O	-	-	-	O	2(0)	12(0)
Satoshi Miyauchi	9(0)	O	O	O	O	O	O	6(0)	15(0)
Yoshinori Ishigami	9(0)	O	-	-	O	O	-	3(0)	12(0)
Yasutaro Matsuki	9(0)	-	-	O	-	-	O	2(0)	11(0)
Toshinobu Katsuya	2(0)	O	O	O	O	-	-	4(0)	6(0)
Shinichi Morishita	2(0)	O	-	O	O	O	-	4(0)	6(0)
Osamu Taninaka	1(0)	O	O	-	-	-	-	2(0)	3(0)
Kazuo Echigo	0(0)	O	O	O	-	-	-	3(0)	3(0)
Hisashi Kaneko	0(0)	O	O	-	-	-	O	3(0)	3(0)
Takumi Horiike	0(0)	-	O	-	O	-	-	2(0)	2(0)
Yasuharu Kurata	0(0)	-	-	O	-	-	-	1(0)	1(0)

== National team (Women) ==
=== Results ===
1986.01.21	Japan	0–1	India	Indonesia
			? (?)

1986.01.26	Japan	7–0	India	Indonesia
	Kioka (?); Handa (?); Noda (?); Nagamine (?)

1986.03.07	Japan	0–2	Chinese Taipei	Tokyo, Japan
			? (?) ? (?)	Stadium: Nishigaoka Soccer Stadium

1986.07.19	Japan	1–5	Italy	Italy
	Takakura (?)		? (?) ? (?) ? (?) ? (?) ? (?)

1986.07.21	Japan	3–0	Mexico	Italy
	Kioka (?); Nagamine (?)

1986.07.25	Japan	1–3	United States	Italy
	Kioka (?)		? (?) ? (?) ? (?)

1986.07.26	Japan	1–2	China	Italy
	Matsuda (?)		? (?) ? (?)

1986.09.18	Japan	1–2	Italy	Tokyo, Japan
	Kioka (?)		? (?) ? (?)	Stadium: Nishigaoka Soccer Stadium

1986.09.23	Japan	2–3	Italy	Tokyo, Japan
	Nagamine (?)		? (?) ? (?) ? (?)	Stadium: National Stadium

1986.12.14	Japan	0–2	China	Hong Kong
			? (?) ? (?)

1986.12.18	Japan	10–0	Malaysia	Hong Kong
	Kioka (?); Tezuka (?); Nagamine (?); Takakura (?); Matsuda (?)

1986.12.21	Japan	4–0	Thailand	Hong Kong
	Kioka (?); Nagamine (?); Noda (?); Matsuda (?)

1986.12.23	Japan	0–2	China	Hong Kong
			? (?) ? (?)

=== Players statistics ===
Player	-1985	01.21	01.26	03.07	07.19	07.21	07.25	07.26	09.18	09.23	12.14	12.18	12.21	12.23	1986	Total
Futaba Kioka	8(1)	O	O(1)	O	O	O(1)	O(1)	O	O(1)	O	O	O(2)	O(1)	O	13(7)	21(8)
Etsuko Handa	8(1)	O	O(2)	O	O	O	O	O	O	O	O	O	O	O	13(2)	21(3)
Midori Honda	8(0)	O	O	-	-	-	-	-	O	-	-	O	O	O	6(0)	14(0)
Sayuri Yamaguchi	5(0)	O	O	O	O	O	O	O	O	O	O	O	O	O	13(0)	18(0)
Michiko Matsuda	4(2)	-	-	-	O	O	O	O(1)	O	O	O	O(1)	O(1)	O	10(3)	14(5)
Asako Takakura	3(0)	O	O	-	O(1)	O	-	O	O	O	O	O(2)	O	O	11(3)	14(3)
Kazuko Hironaka	3(0)	-	-	-	O	O	O	O	O	O	O	O	O	O	10(0)	13(0)
Kimiko Shiratori	3(0)	O	-	O	-	-	-	-	-	-	-	-	-	-	2(0)	5(0)
Chiaki Yamada	2(0)	O	O	O	O	-	O	O	-	-	-	-	-	-	6(0)	8(0)
Mami Kaneda	2(0)	O	-	-	-	-	-	-	-	-	-	-	-	-	1(0)	3(0)
Kaori Nagamine	1(0)	O	O(3)	O	O	O(2)	O	O	O	O(2)	O	O(4)	O(1)	O	13(12)	14(12)
Masae Suzuki	1(0)	O	O	O	O	O	O	O	O	O	O	O	O	O	13(0)	14(0)
Akemi Noda	1(0)	O	O(1)	O	O	O	O	-	O	O	O	O	O(1)	O	12(2)	13(2)
Mayumi Kaji	1(0)	-	O	O	O	O	O	O	O	O	O	O	O	O	12(0)	13(0)
Yoko Takahagi	0(0)	O	O	O	O	O	O	O	O	O	O	O	O	O	13(0)	13(0)
Takako Tezuka	0(0)	-	-	O	-	O	O	O	O	O	O	O(1)	O	O	10(1)	10(1)
Yuko Oita	0(0)	O	O	-	-	-	-	-	-	-	-	-	-	-	2(0)	2(0)
Shoko Hamada	0(0)	O	-	O	-	-	-	-	-	-	-	-	-	-	2(0)	2(0)
Tomomi Seo	0(0)	O	-	-	-	-	-	-	-	-	-	-	-	-	1(0)	1(0)

== Births ==
- 10 June: Hajime Hosogai
