= 1987 in Japanese football =

1987 season

Japanese football in 1987

== Japan Soccer League ==
=== Division 1 ===
Pos	Team	Pld	W	D	L	GF	GA	GD	Pts	Qualification or relegation
1	Yamaha Motors	22	12	10	0	27	10	+17	34	Champions
2	Nippon Kokan	22	13	4	5	25	13	+12	30	
3	Mitsubishi Motors	22	12	5	5	27	15	+12	29	
4	Nissan	22	10	5	7	27	20	+7	25	
5	Yomiuri	22	8	8	6	23	17	+6	24	
6	Yanmar Diesel	22	7	10	5	22	19	+3	24	
7	Furukawa Electric	22	6	9	7	17	16	+1	21	
8	Honda	22	6	8	8	19	22	−3	20	
9	Fujita Engineering	22	6	6	10	16	20	−4	18	
10	Sumitomo	22	5	5	12	17	32	−15	15	
11	Mazda	22	2	9	11	8	18	−10	13	Relegated to Second Division
12	Toyota Motors	22	3	5	14	10	36	−26	11	Relegated to Second Division

=== Division 2 ===
==== First stage ====
===== East =====
Pos	Team	Pld	W	D	L	GF	GA	GD	Pts
1	Toshiba	14	8	4	2	20	5	+15	20
2	ANA Yokohama	14	7	6	1	26	13	+13	20
3	Hitachi	14	6	6	2	22	9	+13	18
4	NTT Kanto	14	5	7	2	20	12	+8	17
5	Fujitsu	14	5	4	5	17	13	+4	14
6	Toho Titanium	14	3	4	7	11	25	−14	10
7	Seino Transportation	14	3	1	10	7	25	−18	7
8	Kofu Club	14	1	4	9	8	29	−21	6

===== West =====
Pos	Team	Pld	W	D	L	GF	GA	GD	Pts
1	Matsushita Electric	14	11	3	0	51	7	+44	25
2	Tanabe Pharmaceuticals	14	8	3	3	27	13	+14	19
3	Cosmo Oil	14	7	4	3	24	15	+9	18
4	Kawasaki Steel	14	6	2	6	21	19	+2	14
5	Osaka Gas	14	6	2	6	15	25	−10	14
6	Nippon Steel	14	4	3	7	15	28	−13	11
7	NTT Kansai	14	3	0	11	11	34	−23	6
8	Mazda Auto Hiroshima	14	2	1	11	8	31	−23	5

==== Second stage ====
===== Promotion Group =====
Pos	Team	Pld	W	D	L	GF	GA	GD	Pts	Promotion
1	ANA	14	11	2	1	26	6	+20	24	Promoted to First Division
2	Matsushita Electric	14	9	2	3	24	8	+16	20	Promoted to First Division
3	Toshiba	14	8	2	4	15	8	+7	18	
4	Hitachi	14	6	3	5	11	12	−1	15	
5	NTT Kanto	14	4	6	4	8	9	−1	14	
6	Tanabe Pharmaceuticals	14	2	7	5	11	16	−5	11	
7	Cosmo Oil	14	2	1	11	7	21	−14	5	
8	Kawasaki Steel	14	1	3	10	8	30	−22	5	

===== Relegation Group =====
====== East ======
Pos	Team	Pld	W	D	L	GF	GA	GD	Pts	Relegation
1	Fujitsu	6	4	0	2	25	17	+8	22	
2	Toho Titanium	6	2	0	4	17	33	−16	14	
3	Kofu Club	6	3	1	2	15	34	−19	13	
4	Seino Transportation	6	2	1	3	13	35	−22	12	Relegated to Regional Leagues

====== West ======
Pos	Team	Pld	W	D	L	GF	GA	GD	Pts	Relegation
1	Nippon Steel	6	4	0	2	25	27	−2	19	
2	Osaka Gas	6	1	3	2	20	30	−10	19	
3	NTT Kansai	6	2	1	3	19	43	−24	11	
4	Mazda Auto Hiroshima	5	2	1	2	16	40	−24	11	Relegated to Regional Leagues

====== 9th-16th Places Playoff ======
Pos	East	Score	West
9–10	Fujitsu	1-2	Nippon Steel
11–12	Toho Titanium	2-0	Osaka Gas
13–14	Kofu Club	0-0(PK4-1)	NTT Kansai
15–16	Seino Transportation	5-0	Mazda Auto Hiroshima

== Emperor's Cup ==
January 1, 1988

Yomiuri	2–0	Mazda
? (?); Tetsuya Totsuka (?)

National Stadium

== National team (Men) ==
=== Results ===
1987.04.08	Japan	3–0	Indonesia	Tokyo, Japan
	Hara 42'; Tezuka 62'; Takeda 89'	JFA		Stadium: Tokyo National Stadium; Attendance: 13,000

1987.04.12	Japan	1–0	Singapore	Tokyo, Japan
	Matsuyama 65'	JFA		Stadium: Tokyo National Stadium; Attendance: 13,000

1987.05.27	Japan	2–2	Senegal	Hiroshima, Japan
	Hara 40'; Matsuyama 50'	JFA	? (?) ? (?)	Stadium: Hiroshima Stadium

1987.06.14	Japan	1–0	Singapore	Singapore
	Mizunuma 41'	JFA		Attendance: 7,318

1987.06.26	Japan	2–1	Indonesia	Jakarta, Indonesia
	Hara 75'; Matsuyama 87'	JFA	? (?)

1987.09.02	Japan	0–0	Thailand	Bangkok, Thailand
		JFA		Attendance: 25,000

1987.09.15	Japan	5–0	Nepal	Tokyo, Japan
	Okudera 16'; Tezuka 17'; Kato 19'; Matsuura 74'; Matsuyama 82'	JFA		Stadium: Tokyo National Stadium

1987.09.18	Japan	9–0	Nepal	Tokyo, Japan
	Matsuura 2', 21', 70'; Kaneko 9'; Hara 26', 28', 32'; Kato 43'; Echigo 83'	JFA		Stadium: Tokyo National Stadium

1987.09.26	Japan	1–0	Thailand	Tokyo, Japan
	Mizunuma 34'	JFA		Stadium: Tokyo National Stadium

1987.10.04	Japan	1–0	China PR	Guangzhou, China PR
	Hara 21'	JFA		Attendance: 60,000

1987.10.26	Japan	0–2	China PR	Tokyo, Japan
		JFA	? (?) ? (?)	Stadium: Tokyo National Stadium

=== Players statistics ===
Player	-1986	04.08	04.12	05.27	06.14	06.26	09.02	09.15	09.18	09.26	10.04	10.26	1987	Total
Hiromi Hara	62(30)	O(1)	O	O(1)	O	O(1)	O	O	O(3)	O	O(1)	O	11(7)	73(37)
Hisashi Kato	50(4)	O	O	O	O	O	O	O(1)	O(1)	O	O	O	11(2)	61(6)
Satoshi Tsunami	45(2)	O	O	O	O	O	O	O	-	O	O	O	10(0)	55(2)
Akihiro Nishimura	40(2)	-	-	O	O	O	O	-	O	O	O	O	8(0)	48(2)
Yasuhiko Okudera	27(8)	O	-	-	-	-	O	O(1)	-	-	O	O	5(1)	32(9)
Toshio Matsuura	15(2)	-	-	O	O	O	O	O(1)	O(3)	O	-	-	7(4)	22(6)
Satoshi Miyauchi	15(0)	O	O	-	O	O	-	-	O	-	-	-	5(0)	20(0)
Satoshi Tezuka	14(0)	O(1)	O	O	O	-	-	O(1)	-	O	O	O	8(2)	22(2)
Takashi Mizunuma	13(4)	-	-	O	O(1)	-	O	O	O	O(1)	O	O	8(2)	21(6)
Kiyotaka Matsui	12(0)	-	-	-	-	-	-	-	O	-	-	-	1(0)	13(0)
Shinichi Morishita	6(0)	O	O	O	O	O	O	O	-	O	O	O	10(0)	16(0)
Toshinobu Katsuya	6(0)	-	-	-	-	-	O	O	O	O	O	O	6(0)	12(0)
Hisashi Kaneko	3(0)	O	O	-	O	-	-	-	O(1)	-	-	-	4(1)	7(1)
Kazuo Echigo	3(0)	O	O	-	-	-	-	-	O(1)	-	-	-	3(1)	6(1)
Takumi Horiike	2(0)	O	O	O	O	O	O	O	O	O	O	O	11(0)	13(0)
Yasuharu Kurata	1(0)	-	-	O	O	O	-	O	-	O	-	-	5(0)	6(0)
Yoshiyuki Matsuyama	0(0)	O	O(1)	O(1)	O	O(1)	-	O(1)	O	-	O	O	9(4)	9(4)
Kuniharu Nakamoto	0(0)	-	-	-	-	-	O	O	-	O	O	O	5(0)	5(0)
Nobuhiro Takeda	0(0)	O(1)	O	-	-	O	-	-	O	-	-	-	4(1)	4(1)
Katsuyoshi Shinto	0(0)	-	-	O	-	O	-	-	-	-	-	-	2(0)	2(0)
Tomoyasu Asaoka	0(0)	-	O	-	-	-	-	-	-	-	-	-	1(0)	1(0)

== National team (Women) ==
=== Results ===
1987.08.04	Japan	1–3	Chinese Taipei	Chinese Taipei
	Takakura (?)		? (?) ? (?) ? (?)

1987.08.09	Japan	1–2	Chinese Taipei	Chinese Taipei
	Yamada (?)		? (?) ? (?)

1987.12.12	Japan	0–1	United States	Chinese Taipei
			? (?)

1987.12.15	Japan	5–0	Hong Kong	Chinese Taipei
	Kioka (?); Nagamine (?); Takakura (?)

=== Players statistics ===
Player	-1986	08.04	08.09	12.12	12.15	1987	Total
Futaba Kioka	21(8)	O	O	O	O(1)	4(1)	25(9)
Etsuko Handa	21(3)	O	O	O	O	4(0)	25(3)
Kaori Nagamine	14(12)	O	O	O	O(1)	4(1)	18(13)
Michiko Matsuda	14(5)	O	O	O	O	4(0)	18(5)
Asako Takakura	14(3)	O(1)	O	-	O(3)	3(4)	17(7)
Midori Honda	14(0)	O	O	O	O	4(0)	18(0)
Masae Suzuki	14(0)	O	O	O	O	4(0)	18(0)
Akemi Noda	13(2)	O	O	O	O	4(0)	17(2)
Mayumi Kaji	13(0)	O	O	O	O	4(0)	17(0)
Yoko Takahagi	13(0)	O	O	-	-	2(0)	15(0)
Kazuko Hironaka	13(0)	-	-	O	O	2(0)	15(0)
Takako Tezuka	10(1)	O	O	O	O	4(0)	14(1)
Chiaki Yamada	8(0)	O	O(1)	O	O	4(1)	12(1)
Yuko Oita	2(0)	-	-	-	O	1(0)	3(0)
Akiko Hayakawa	0(0)	O	-	-	-	1(0)	1(0)

== Births ==
- 20 December: Michihiro Yasuda
