= 1984 in Japanese football =

1984 season

Japanese football in 1984

== Japan Soccer League ==
=== Division 1 ===
Pos	Team	Pld	W	D	L	GF	GA	GD	Pts	Qualification
1	Yomiuri	18	11	4	3	41	20	+21	26	Champions
2	Nissan	18	11	3	4	40	23	+17	25	
3	Yamaha Motors	18	10	4	4	25	16	+9	24	
4	Furukawa Electric	18	8	5	5	28	20	+8	21	
5	Honda	18	7	5	6	26	23	+3	19	
6	Fujita Engineering	18	6	6	6	25	25	0	18	
7	Mitsubishi Motors	18	6	3	9	22	33	−11	15	
8	Nippon Kokan	18	4	6	8	16	23	−7	14	
9	Yanmar Diesel	18	5	4	9	15	28	−13	14	
10	Hitachi	18	2	0	16	11	41	−30	4	

=== Division 2 ===
Pos	Team	Pld	W	D	L	GF	GA	GD	Pts	Promotion
1	Sumitomo	18	10	6	2	40	23	+17	26	Promoted to First Division
2	ANA Yokohama	18	12	2	4	31	17	+14	26	Promoted to First Division
3	Matsushita Electric	18	8	6	4	25	19	+6	22	
4	Toshiba	18	9	4	5	29	25	+4	22	
5	Tanabe Pharmaceuticals	18	7	7	4	30	21	+9	21	
6	Mazda	18	7	4	7	24	20	+4	18	
7	Fujitsu	18	5	4	9	20	30	−10	14	
8	Toyota Motors	18	4	5	9	24	31	−7	13	
9	Nippon Steel	18	4	4	10	15	28	−13	12	
10	Kofu Club	18	1	4	13	20	44	−24	6	

== Emperor's Cup ==
January 1, 1985

Yomiuri	2–0	Furukawa Electric
? (?) ? (?)

National Stadium

== National team (Men) ==
=== Results ===
1984.03.06	Japan	7–1	Brunei	Bandar Seri Begawan, Brunei
	Kimura 19', 35'; Kaneda (?); Hara (?); Usui (?)	JFA	? (?)

1984.04.15	Japan	2–5	Thailand	Singapore
	Hashiratani 71'; Kimura 78'	JFA	? (?) ? (?) ? (?) ? (?) ? (?)

1984.04.18	Japan	1–2	Malaysia	Singapore
	Hara 84'	JFA	? (?) ? (?)

1984.04.21	Japan	1–2	Iraq	Singapore
	Hara 34'	JFA	? (?) ? (?)

1984.04.26	Japan	1–2	Qatar	Singapore
	Hara 52'	JFA	? (?) ? (?)

1984.05.31	Japan	1–0	China PR	Saitama, Japan
	Kato 86'	JFA		Stadium: Omiya Football Stadium

1984.09.30	Japan	2–1	South Korea	Seoul, South Korea
	Kimura 36'; Mizunuma 50'	JFA	? (?)

=== Players statistics ===
Player	-1983	03.06	04.15	04.18	04.21	04.26	05.31	09.30	1984	Total
Hideki Maeda	62(11)	O	O	-	-	O	-	-	3(0)	65(11)
Mitsuhisa Taguchi	55(0)	O	O	O	O	-	-	-	4(0)	59(0)
Nobutoshi Kaneda	52(5)	O(1)	O	O	O	O	O	-	6(1)	58(6)
Hiromi Hara	39(13)	O(2)	O	O(1)	O(1)	O(1)	O	O	7(5)	46(18)
Hiroyuki Usui	35(13)	O(2)	O	-	-	O	-	-	3(2)	38(15)
Kazushi Kimura	31(13)	O(2)	O(1)	O	O	O	O	O(1)	7(4)	38(17)
Hisashi Kato	31(3)	-	O	O	O	O	O(1)	O	6(1)	37(4)
Masafumi Yokoyama	30(10)	-	-	O	-	-	-	-	1(0)	31(10)
Satoshi Tsunami	28(0)	O	O	O	-	-	O	O	5(0)	33(0)
Kazuo Saito	28(0)	O	-	O	O	O	-	-	4(0)	32(0)
Akihiro Nishimura	26(0)	-	-	-	-	-	-	O	1(0)	27(0)
Tetsuo Sugamata	22(0)	-	O	-	-	-	-	-	1(0)	23(0)
Takeshi Okada	17(1)	O	-	O	-	O	O	-	4(0)	21(1)
Takeshi Koshida	15(0)	O	-	O	O	-	-	-	3(0)	18(0)
Koji Tanaka	14(3)	O	O	O	O	O	O	-	6(0)	20(3)
Koichi Hashiratani	13(0)	-	O(1)	O	O	-	O	O	5(1)	18(1)
Shinji Tanaka	12(0)	-	-	-	O	O	-	-	2(0)	14(0)
Toshio Matsuura	11(1)	-	-	-	O	-	-	-	1(0)	12(1)
Kazumi Tsubota	6(0)	-	-	-	-	O	-	-	1(0)	7(0)
Yutaka Ikeuchi	3(0)	-	-	-	-	-	O	-	1(0)	4(0)
Takashi Mizunuma	0(0)	-	-	O	O	O	O	O(1)	5(1)	5(1)
Yasutaro Matsuki	0(0)	-	O	-	-	-	O	O	3(0)	3(0)
Kiyotaka Matsui	0(0)	-	-	-	-	-	O	O	2(0)	2(0)
Yoshinori Ishigami	0(0)	-	-	-	-	-	-	O	1(0)	1(0)
Atsushi Uchiyama	0(0)	-	-	-	-	-	-	O	1(0)	1(0)
Satoshi Miyauchi	0(0)	-	-	-	-	-	-	O	1(0)	1(0)
Osamu Taninaka	0(0)	-	-	-	-	-	-	O	1(0)	1(0)

== National team (Women) ==
=== Results ===
1984.10.17	Japan	0–6	Italy	China
			? (?) ? (?) ? (?) ? (?) ? (?) ? (?)

1984.10.22	Japan	2–6	Australia	China
	Matsuda (?)		? (?) ? (?) ? (?) ? (?) ? (?) ? (?)

1984.10.24	Japan	1–5	Italy	China
	Kioka (?)		? (?) ? (?) ? (?) ? (?) ? (?)

=== Players statistics ===
Player	-1983	10.17	10.22	10.24	1984	Total
Etsuko Handa	5(1)	O	O	O	3(0)	8(1)
Futaba Kioka	5(0)	O	O	O(1)	3(1)	8(1)
Midori Honda	5(0)	O	O	O	3(0)	8(0)
Sayuri Yamaguchi	2(0)	O	O	O	3(0)	5(0)
Michiko Matsuda	1(0)	O	O(2)	O	3(2)	4(2)
Kaoru Kakinami	1(0)	O	O	O	3(0)	4(0)
Emiko Kubo	1(0)	O	O	O	3(0)	4(0)
Keiko Saito	0(0)	O	O	O	3(0)	3(0)
Kimiko Shiratori	0(0)	O	O	O	3(0)	3(0)
Kazuko Hironaka	0(0)	O	O	O	3(0)	3(0)
Asako Takakura	0(0)	O	O	O	3(0)	3(0)
Chiaki Yamada	0(0)	O	-	O	2(0)	2(0)
Mami Kaneda	0(0)	-	O	O	2(0)	2(0)
Akemi Noda	0(0)	O	-	-	1(0)	1(0)
Kaori Nagamine	0(0)	-	O	-	1(0)	1(0)
Masae Suzuki	0(0)	-	-	O	1(0)	1(0)

== Births ==
- 5 April: Kisho Yano
