= 1989 in Japanese football =

1989 season

Japanese football in 1989

== Japan Soccer League ==
=== Division 1 ===
Pos	Team	Pld	W	D	L	GF	GA	GD	Pts	Qualification or relegation
1	Nissan	22	14	5	3	44	26	+18	47	Champions
2	Yomiuri S.C.	22	13	7	2	36	16	+20	46	
3	ANA Club	22	11	7	4	34	19	+15	40	
4	Furukawa Electric	22	10	8	4	25	16	+9	38	
5	Yamaha Motors	22	9	7	6	23	19	+4	34	
6	Honda	22	10	2	10	32	29	+3	32	
7	Yanmar Diesel	22	6	9	7	20	23	−3	27	
8	Nippon Kokan	22	5	9	8	16	32	−16	24	
9	Toshiba	22	4	8	10	20	28	−8	20	
10	Matsushita Electric	22	4	7	11	24	31	−7	19	
11	Fujita Engineering	22	4	5	13	17	30	−13	17	Relegated to Second Division
12	Hitachi	22	3	4	15	12	26	−14	13	Relegated to Second Division

=== Division 2 ===
Pos	Team	Pld	W	D	L	GF	GA	GD	Pts	Promotion or relegation
1	Mitsubishi Motors	30	22	4	4	89	25	+64	70	Promoted to First Division
2	Toyota Motors	30	22	3	5	84	26	+58	69	Promoted to First Division
3	Mazda	30	20	7	3	62	20	+42	67	
4	Kyoto Shiko Club	30	17	9	4	61	28	+33	60	
5	Fujitsu	30	17	4	9	58	35	+23	55	
6	Sumitomo	30	14	10	6	50	27	+23	52	
7	Tanabe Pharmaceuticals	30	15	7	8	44	36	+8	52	
8	Kawasaki Steel	30	14	7	9	47	23	+24	49	
9	NTT Kanto	30	13	8	9	41	32	+9	47	
10	Cosmo Oil	30	8	8	14	38	39	−1	32	
11	Toho Titanium	30	6	9	15	26	56	−30	27	
12	Kofu Club	30	5	9	16	25	51	−26	24	
13	Nippon Steel	30	7	3	20	29	68	−39	24	
14	Osaka Gas	30	5	4	21	17	78	−61	19	
15	Mazda Auto Hiroshima	30	3	3	24	30	87	−57	12	Relegated to Regional Leagues
16	Teijin SC Matsuyama	30	2	5	23	16	86	−70	11	Relegated to Regional Leagues

== Emperor's Cup ==
January 1, 1990

Nissan Motors	3–2	Yamaha Motors
Lopes (?); Renato (?); Kazushi Kimura (?)		? (?) ? (?)

National Stadium

== National team (Men) ==
=== Results ===
1989.01.20	Japan	2–2	Iran	Tehrān, Iran
	Maeda 19', 57'	JFA	? (?) ? (?)

1989.05.05	Japan	0–1	South Korea	Seoul, South Korea
		JFA	? (?)

1989.05.10	Japan	2–2	China PR	Tokyo, Japan
	Kajino 17'; Maeda 56'	JFA	? (?) ? (?)	Stadium: Nishigaoka Soccer Stadium

1989.05.13	Japan	2–0	China PR	Okayama, Japan
	Yoshida 26'; Maeda 40'	JFA		Stadium: Okayama Stadium

1989.05.22	Japan	0–0	Hong Kong	Hong Kong
		JFA

1989.05.28	Japan	0–0	Indonesia	Jakarta, Indonesia
		JFA

1989.06.04	Japan	2–1	North Korea	Tokyo, Japan
	Mizunuma 74'; 88' (o.g.)	JFA	? (?)	Stadium: Tokyo National Stadium

1989.06.11	Japan	5–0	Indonesia	Tokyo, Japan
	Horiike 5'; Maeda 16'; Shinto 19'; Hasegawa 24'; Kurosaki 69'	JFA		Stadium: Nishigaoka Soccer Stadium

1989.06.18	Japan	0–0	Hong Kong	Hyōgo, Japan
		JFA		Stadium: Kobe Universiade Memorial Stadium

1989.06.25	Japan	0–2	North Korea	Pyongyang, North Korea
		JFA	? (?) ? (?)

1989.07.23	Japan	0–1	Brazil	Rio de Janeiro, Brazil
		JFA	? (?)

=== Players statistics ===
Player	-1988	01.20	05.05	05.10	05.13	05.22	05.28	06.04	06.11	06.18	06.25	07.23	1989	Total
Takashi Mizunuma	24(6)	-	-	O	-	O	O	O(1)	O	O	O	O	8(1)	32(7)
Shinichi Morishita	18(0)	-	-	-	O	-	-	-	-	-	O	O	3(0)	21(0)
Takumi Horiike	14(0)	O	O	O	O	O	O	O	O(1)	O	O	O	11(1)	25(1)
Hiroshi Hirakawa	10(0)	O	-	O	-	-	-	-	-	-	-	-	2(0)	12(0)
Yoshiyuki Matsuyama	9(4)	-	-	-	-	-	-	-	-	-	-	O	1(0)	10(4)
Tomoyasu Asaoka	6(0)	O	O	-	-	-	-	-	-	-	-	-	2(0)	8(0)
Tetsuji Hashiratani	5(1)	O	O	O	O	O	O	O	O	O	O	-	10(0)	15(1)
Osamu Maeda	5(1)	O(2)	O	O(1)	O(1)	O	O	O	O(1)	O	-	-	9(5)	14(6)
Masami Ihara	5(0)	O	O	O	O	O	O	O	O	O	O	O	11(0)	16(0)
Katsuyoshi Shinto	5(0)	-	-	O	-	O	O	O	O(1)	O	O	O	8(1)	13(1)
Toru Sano	5(0)	O	-	-	-	-	-	-	-	-	-	-	1(0)	6(0)
Satoru Mochizuki	3(0)	-	O	-	O	-	O	-	-	-	-	O	4(0)	7(0)
Masanao Sasaki	2(0)	O	O	O	O	O	O	O	O	O	O	O	11(0)	13(0)
Mitsunori Yoshida	1(0)	O	-	O	O(1)	O	O	O	O	O	O	O	10(1)	11(1)
Shigetatsu Matsunaga	1(0)	O	O	O	-	O	O	O	O	O	O	-	9(0)	10(0)
Tomoyuki Kajino	1(0)	-	O	O(1)	O	O	-	O	O	O	O	-	8(1)	9(1)
Masaaki Mori	1(0)	-	O	O	O	O	O	O	-	-	-	O	7(0)	8(0)
Atsushi Natori	1(0)	-	-	O	O	-	-	-	-	O	O	O	5(0)	6(0)
Kenta Hasegawa	0(0)	O	O	O	O	O	O	O	O(1)	O	O	O	11(1)	11(1)
Hisashi Kurosaki	0(0)	-	O	-	-	-	O	O	O(1)	O	O	O	7(1)	7(1)
Katsumi Oenoki	0(0)	-	O	O	O	O	-	-	-	-	-	-	4(0)	4(0)

== National team (Women) ==
=== Results ===
1989.01.12	Japan	0–1	Finland	China
			? (?)

1989.01.14	Japan	13–0	Philippines	China
	Kioka (?); Nagamine (?); Tezuka (?); Kuroda (?); Watanabe (?)

1989.01.16	Japan	0–4	China	China
			? (?) ? (?) ? (?) ? (?)

1989.12.02	Japan	2–2	Australia	Kanagawa, Japan
	Nagamine (?)		? (?) ? (?)	Stadium: Hiratsuka Stadium

1989.12.04	Japan	1–1	Australia	Chiba, Japan
	Kioka (?)		? (?)	Stadium: Akitsu Park Soccer Stadium

1989.12.19	Japan	11–0	Indonesia	Hong Kong
	Kioka (?); Handa (?); Nagamine (?); Takakura (?); Tezuka (?)

1989.12.22	Japan	3–0	Hong Kong	Hong Kong
	Nagamine (?); Noda (?); Yamada (?)

1989.12.24	Japan	14–0	Nepal	Hong Kong
	(?); Handa (?); Nagamine (?); Ishibashi (?); Kuroda (?); Yamada (?); Kioka (?); Hironaka (?)

1989.12.26	Japan	0–1	Chinese Taipei	Hong Kong
			? (?)

1989.12.29	Japan	9–0	Hong Kong	Hong Kong
	Kioka (?); Handa (?); Watanabe (?); Matsuda (?)

=== Players statistics ===
Player	-1988	01.12	01.14	01.16	12.02	12.04	12.19	12.22	12.24	12.26	12.29	1989	Total
Futaba Kioka	28(9)	O	O(1)	O	O	O(1)	O(1)	O	O(2)	O	O(4)	10(9)	38(18)
Etsuko Handa	28(4)	O	-	O	O	O	O(1)	O	O(2)	O	O(3)	9(6)	37(10)
Kaori Nagamine	21(14)	O	O(2)	O	O(2)	O	O(4)	O(1)	O(4)	O	O	10(13)	31(27)
Masae Suzuki	21(0)	O	O	O	O	O	O	O	-	O	O	9(0)	30(0)
Midori Honda	21(0)	O	-	O	O	O	O	O	-	O	O	8(0)	29(0)
Asako Takakura	20(7)	O	-	O	O	O	O(3)	-	O	-	-	6(3)	26(10)
Michiko Matsuda	20(5)	O	O	O	O	O	O	O	-	O	O(1)	9(1)	29(6)
Akemi Noda	20(2)	O	O	O	-	-	-	O(1)	O	O	O	7(1)	27(3)
Mayumi Kaji	20(0)	O	O	O	O	O	O	O	-	O	O	9(0)	29(0)
Takako Tezuka	17(2)	O	O(4)	O	O	O	O(2)	O	-	O	O	9(6)	26(8)
Yoko Takahagi	15(0)	-	-	-	O	O	O	O	O	-	O	6(0)	21(0)
Kazuko Hironaka	15(0)	-	-	-	O	-	O	-	O(2)	-	-	3(2)	18(2)
Chiaki Yamada	14(1)	-	O	O	O	-	-	O(1)	O(1)	O	O	7(2)	21(3)
Yumi Watanabe	2(0)	O	O(1)	O	O	O	O	-	O	O	O(1)	9(2)	11(2)
Tomoko Matsunaga	2(0)	-	O	-	-	-	-	O	O	-	O	4(0)	6(0)
Kyoko Kuroda	0(0)	O	O(5)	O	-	-	-	-	O(1)	-	-	4(6)	4(6)
Noriko Ishibashi	0(0)	-	-	-	-	-	-	-	O(1)	-	-	1(1)	1(1)
Megumi Sakata	0(0)	-	-	-	-	-	-	-	O	-	-	1(0)	1(0)

== Births ==
- 12 November: Hiroshi Kiyotake
