= 1990 in Japanese football =

1990 season

== Japan Soccer League ==
=== Division 1 ===
Pos	Team	Pld	W	D	L	GF	GA	GD	Pts	Qualification or relegation
1	Yomiuri S.C.	22	15	4	3	41	16	+25	49	1991–92 Asian Club Championship
2	Nissan	22	11	9	2	27	10	+17	42	1991–92 Asian Cup Winners' Cup
3	Honda	22	10	8	4	29	21	+8	38	
4	Toshiba	22	8	8	6	26	24	+2	32	
5	Toyota Motors	22	7	9	6	26	27	−1	30	
6	Matsushita	22	7	9	6	24	26	−2	30	
7	ANA Club	22	7	6	9	24	24	0	27	
8	Yamaha Motors	22	6	7	9	21	22	−1	25	
9	Furukawa Electric	22	5	10	7	22	24	−2	25	
10	Mitsubishi Motors	22	6	6	10	18	23	−5	24	
11	Yanmar Diesel	22	5	5	12	13	31	−18	20	Relegated to Second Division
12	Nippon Kokan	22	2	5	15	16	39	−23	11	Relegated to Second Division

=== Division 2 ===
Pos	Team	Pld	W	D	L	GF	GA	GD	Pts	Promotion or relegation
1	Hitachi	30	27	1	2	102	19	+83	82	Promoted to First Division
2	Mazda	30	24	2	4	76	17	+59	74	Promoted to First Division
3	Fujita Engineering	30	21	7	2	60	15	+45	70	
4	Sumitomo	30	15	6	9	43	24	+19	51	
5	Fujitsu	30	15	6	9	46	30	+16	51	
6	NTT Kanto	30	16	3	11	43	41	+2	51	
7	Kawasaki Steel	30	15	4	11	37	41	−4	49	
8	Yomiuri S.C. (Juniors)	30	11	7	12	37	38	−1	40	
9	Tanabe Pharmaceuticals	30	12	4	14	39	41	−2	40	
10	Otsuka Pharmaceutical	30	11	2	17	32	44	−12	35	
11	Cosmo Oil Yokkaichi	30	9	7	14	26	39	−13	34	
12	Kofu Club	30	9	7	14	37	57	−20	34	
13	Kyoto Shiko Club	30	8	7	15	42	62	−20	31	
14	Toho Titanium	30	4	6	20	13	41	−28	18	
15	Osaka Gas	30	2	6	22	14	62	−48	12	Relegated to Regional Leagues
16	Nippon Steel	30	3	2	25	18	94	−76	11	Relegated to Regional Leagues

== Emperor's Cup ==
January 1, 1991

Matsushita Electric	0–0	Nissan Motors
Penalties
	4–3

National Stadium

== National team (Men) ==
=== Results ===
1990.07.27	Japan	0–2	South Korea	Beijing, China PR
		JFA	? (?) ? (?)

1990.07.29	Japan	0–1	China PR	Beijing, China PR
		JFA	? (?)

1990.07.31	Japan	0–1	North Korea	Beijing, China PR
		JFA	? (?)

1990.09.26	Japan	3–0	Bangladesh	Beijing, China PR
	Hashiratani 7'; Hasegawa 28', 64'	JFA

1990.09.28	Japan	0–2	Saudi Arabia	Beijing, China PR
		JFA	? (?) ? (?)

1990.10.01	Japan	0–1	Iran	Beijing, China PR
		JFA	? (?)

=== Players statistics ===
Player	-1989	07.27	07.29	07.31	09.26	09.28	10.01	1990	Total
Takumi Horiike	25(1)	O	O	O	O	O	O	6(0)	31(1)
Shinichi Morishita	21(0)	O	O	O	O	O	O	6(0)	27(0)
Masami Ihara	16(0)	O	O	O	O	O	O	6(0)	22(0)
Tetsuji Hashiratani	15(1)	O	O	O	O(1)	O	O	6(1)	21(2)
Katsuyoshi Shinto	13(1)	-	-	-	-	O	O	2(0)	15(1)
Masanao Sasaki	13(0)	O	O	O	O	O	O	6(0)	19(0)
Kenta Hasegawa	11(1)	O	O	O	O(2)	O	O	6(2)	17(3)
Hisashi Kurosaki	7(1)	-	-	-	O	-	O	2(0)	9(1)
Toru Sano	6(0)	O	-	O	-	O	-	3(0)	9(0)
Nobuhiro Takeda	4(1)	O	O	O	-	O	-	4(0)	8(1)
Katsumi Oenoki	4(0)	-	O	-	-	-	-	1(0)	5(0)
Masahiro Fukuda	0(0)	O	O	O	O	O	-	5(0)	5(0)
Yuji Sakakura	0(0)	O	O	O	O	-	O	5(0)	5(0)
Shiro Kikuhara	0(0)	-	O	O	O	O	O	5(0)	5(0)
Akihiro Nagashima	0(0)	O	O	O	-	-	-	3(0)	3(0)
Ruy Ramos	0(0)	-	-	-	O	O	O	3(0)	3(0)
Kazuyoshi Miura	0(0)	-	-	-	O	O	O	3(0)	3(0)
Yasuharu Sorimachi	0(0)	O	-	-	-	-	O	2(0)	2(0)
Shinichiro Tani	0(0)	O	-	-	-	-	-	1(0)	1(0)
Masashi Nakayama	0(0)	-	-	O	-	-	-	1(0)	1(0)

== National team (Women) ==
=== Results ===
1990.09.06	Japan	13–1	South Korea	South Korea
	Kioka (?); Nagamine (?); Takakura (?); Matsuda (?); Tezuka (?)		? (?)

1990.09.09	Japan	5–0	South Korea	South Korea
	Kioka (?); Kuroda (?); Noda (?); Mizuma (?); Tezuka (?)

1990.09.27	Japan	0–5	China	China
			? (?) ? (?) ? (?) ? (?) ? (?)

1990.09.29	Japan	8–1	South Korea	China
	Kioka (?); Handa (?); Nagamine (?); Noda (?); Mizuma (?); Hironaka (?)		? (?)

1990.10.01	Japan	5–0	Hong Kong	China
	Kioka (?); Handa (?); Nagamine (?); Matsuda (?)

1990.10.03	Japan	3–1	Chinese Taipei	China
	Handa (?); Nagamine (?)		? (?)

1990.10.06	Japan	1–1	North Korea	China
	Mizuma (?)		? (?)

=== Players statistics ===
Player	-1989	09.06	09.09	09.27	09.29	10.01	10.03	10.06	1990	Total
Futaba Kioka	38(18)	O(2)	O(1)	O	O(2)	O(2)	O	O	7(7)	45(25)
Etsuko Handa	37(10)	O	-	O	O(1)	O(1)	O(2)	O	6(4)	43(14)
Kaori Nagamine	31(27)	O(3)	-	O	O(2)	O(1)	O(1)	O	6(7)	37(34)
Masae Suzuki	30(0)	O	-	O	-	O	O	O	5(0)	35(0)
Michiko Matsuda	29(6)	O(1)	-	O	-	O(1)	O	O	5(2)	34(8)
Mayumi Kaji	29(0)	O	O	O	O	O	O	O	7(0)	36(0)
Midori Honda	29(0)	O	-	O	-	O	O	O	5(0)	34(0)
Akemi Noda	27(3)	O	O(1)	O	O(1)	O	O	O	7(2)	34(5)
Asako Takakura	26(10)	O(2)	O	O	-	O	-	-	4(2)	30(12)
Takako Tezuka	26(8)	O(5)	O(1)	-	O	O	-	-	4(6)	30(14)
Yoko Takahagi	21(0)	O	O	O	O	-	O	O	6(0)	27(0)
Kazuko Hironaka	18(2)	O	O	-	O(1)	-	-	-	3(1)	21(3)
Sayuri Yamaguchi	18(0)	-	-	-	-	O	-	-	1(0)	19(0)
Yumi Watanabe	11(2)	O	O	O	O	-	O	O	6(0)	17(2)
Tomoko Matsunaga	6(0)	-	O	-	O	-	-	-	2(0)	8(0)
Kyoko Kuroda	4(6)	-	O(1)	-	-	O	-	-	2(1)	6(7)
Megumi Sakata	1(0)	-	O	-	O	-	-	-	2(0)	3(0)
Yuriko Mizuma	0(0)	-	O(1)	-	O(1)	O	O	O(1)	5(3)	5(3)

== Births ==
- 18 May: Yuya Osako
