= 1988 in Japanese football =

1988 season

Japanese football in 1988

== Japan Soccer League ==
=== Division 1 ===
Pos	Team	Pld	W	D	L	GF	GA	GD	Pts	Qualification or relegation
1	Nissan	22	14	4	4	32	17	+15	46	Champions
2	ANA Club	22	12	4	6	37	22	+15	40	
3	Yamaha Motors	22	12	3	7	31	21	+10	39	
4	Fujita Engineering	22	10	6	6	34	20	+14	36	
5	Yomiuri	22	8	8	6	25	23	+2	32	
6	Furukawa Electric	22	8	5	9	21	19	+2	29	
7	Matsushita Electric	22	8	5	9	26	30	−4	29	
8	Yanmar Diesel	22	7	7	8	23	22	+1	28	
9	Honda	22	7	6	9	20	23	−3	27	
10	Nippon Kokan	22	3	10	9	17	31	−14	19	
11	Sumitomo	22	4	7	11	12	37	−25	19	Relegated to Second Division
12	Mitsubishi Motors	22	1	11	10	14	27	−13	14	Relegated to Second Division

=== Division 2 ===
==== First stage ====
===== East =====
Pos	Team	Pld	W	D	L	GF	GA	GD	Pts
1	Toshiba	14	9	5	0	38	7	+31	23
2	Fujitsu	14	8	4	2	22	13	+9	20
3	Hitachi	14	7	5	2	18	9	+9	19
4	NTT Kanto	14	6	4	4	16	12	+4	16
5	Kofu Club	14	7	0	7	19	24	−5	14
6	Toho Titanium	14	3	3	8	10	24	−14	9
7	Cosmo Oil	14	2	4	8	13	25	−12	8
8	Fujieda City Office	14	1	1	12	7	29	−22	3

===== West =====
Pos	Team	Pld	W	D	L	GF	GA	GD	Pts
1	Mazda	14	9	4	1	24	6	+18	22
2	Toyota Motors	14	8	5	1	27	8	+19	21
3	Tanabe Pharmaceuticals	14	8	3	3	20	11	+9	19
4	Osaka Gas	14	7	4	3	20	18	+2	18
5	Nippon Steel	14	4	4	6	16	19	−3	12
6	Kawasaki Steel	14	1	6	7	8	15	−7	8
7	Teijin Matsuyama	14	2	4	8	18	32	−14	8
8	NTT Kansai	14	1	2	11	7	31	−24	4

==== Second stage ====
===== Promotion Group =====
Pos	Team	Pld	W	D	L	GF	GA	GD	Pts	Promotion
1	Toshiba	14	8	5	1	20	10	+10	21	Promoted to First Division
2	Hitachi	14	8	2	4	13	9	+4	18	Promoted to First Division
3	Tanabe Pharmaceuticals	14	6	5	3	17	13	+4	17	
4	Fujitsu	14	6	4	4	16	15	+1	16	
5	Mazda	14	5	4	5	16	9	+7	14	
6	Toyota Motors	14	3	6	5	18	18	0	12	
7	NTT Kanto	13	4	2	7	18	20	−2	10	
8	Osaka Gas	13	0	2	11	5	29	−24	2	

===== Relegation Group =====
====== East ======
Pos	Team	Pld	W	D	L	GF	GA	GD	Pts	Relegation
1	Kofu Club	20	9	2	9	24	29	−5	20	
2	Cosmo Oil	20	6	5	9	25	30	−5	17	
3	Toho Titanium	20	4	5	11	17	33	−16	13	
4	Fujieda City Office	20	2	4	14	11	38	−27	8	Relegated to Regional Leagues

====== West ======
Pos	Team	Pld	W	D	L	GF	GA	GD	Pts	Relegation
1	Nippon Steel	20	7	6	7	25	25	0	20	
2	Kawasaki Steel	20	2	10	8	15	22	−7	14	
3	Teijin Matsuyama	20	4	5	11	26	42	−16	13	
4	NTT Kansai	20	3	3	14	17	42	−25	9	Relegated to Regional Leagues

====== 9th-16th Places Playoff ======
Pos	East	Score	West
9–10	Kofu Club	1-1(PK3-1)	Nippon Steel
11–12	Cosmo Oil	0-0(PK3-2)	Kawasaki Steel
13–14	Toho Titanium	2-3	Teijin Matsuyama
15–16	Fujieda City Office	0-3	NTT Kansai

== Emperor's Cup ==
January 1, 1989

Nissan Motors	3–1	Fujita Industries
? (?) ? (?) ? (?)		? (?)

National Stadium

== National team (Men) ==
=== Results ===
1988.01.27	Japan	1–1	United Arab Emirates	Dubai, United Arab Emirates
	Hashiratani 85'	JFA	? (?)

1988.01.30	Japan	0–2	United Arab Emirates	Abu Dhabi, United Arab Emirates
		JFA	? (?) ? (?)

1988.02.02	Japan	1–1	Oman	Muscat, Oman
	Maeda 88'	JFA	? (?)

1988.06.02	Japan	0–3	China PR	Aichi, Japan
		JFA	? (?) ? (?) ? (?)	Stadium: Mizuho Athletic Stadium

1988.10.26	Japan	0–1	South Korea	Tokyo, Japan
		JFA	? (?)	Stadium: Tokyo National Stadium

=== Players statistics ===
Player	-1987	01.27	01.30	02.02	06.02	10.26	1988	Total
Hiromi Hara	73(37)	-	-	-	O	O	2(0)	75(37)
Akihiro Nishimura	48(2)	-	O	-	-	-	1(0)	49(2)
Satoshi Tezuka	22(2)	O	O	O	-	-	3(0)	25(2)
Takashi Mizunuma	21(6)	-	-	O	O	O	3(0)	24(6)
Shinichi Morishita	16(0)	O	O	-	-	-	2(0)	18(0)
Kiyotaka Matsui	13(0)	-	-	O	O	-	2(0)	15(0)
Takumi Horiike	13(0)	-	-	-	-	O	1(0)	14(0)
Hiroshi Hirakawa	6(0)	O	O	O	O	-	4(0)	10(0)
Katsuyoshi Shinto	2(0)	O	O	O	-	-	3(0)	5(0)
Tomoyasu Asaoka	1(0)	O	O	O	O	O	5(0)	6(0)
Tetsuji Hashiratani	0(0)	O(1)	O	O	O	O	5(1)	5(1)
Osamu Maeda	0(0)	O	O	O(1)	O	O	5(1)	5(1)
Masami Ihara	0(0)	O	O	O	O	O	5(0)	5(0)
Toru Sano	0(0)	O	O	O	O	O	5(0)	5(0)
Satoru Mochizuki	0(0)	O	O	O	-	-	3(0)	3(0)
Nobuyo Fujishiro	0(0)	O	O	-	-	-	2(0)	2(0)
Katsuhiro Kusaki	0(0)	O	-	-	-	O	2(0)	2(0)
Masanao Sasaki	0(0)	-	-	-	O	O	2(0)	2(0)
Yuji Sugano	0(0)	-	-	O	-	-	1(0)	1(0)
Tomoyuki Kajino	0(0)	-	-	-	O	-	1(0)	1(0)
Masaaki Mori	0(0)	-	-	-	O	-	1(0)	1(0)
Mitsunori Yoshida	0(0)	-	-	-	O	-	1(0)	1(0)
Shigetatsu Matsunaga	0(0)	-	-	-	-	O	1(0)	1(0)
Atsushi Natori	0(0)	-	-	-	-	O	1(0)	1(0)

== National team (Women) ==
=== Results ===
1988.06.01	Japan	2–5	United States	China
	Nagamine (?); Tezuka (?)		? (?) ? (?) ? (?) ? (?) ? (?)

1988.06.03	Japan	1–2	Czechoslovakia	China
	Handa (?)		? (?) ? (?)

1988.06.05	Japan	0–3	Sweden	China
			? (?) ? (?) ? (?)

=== Players statistics ===
Player	-1987	06.01	06.03	06.05	1988	Total
Futaba Kioka	25(9)	O	O	O	3(0)	28(9)
Etsuko Handa	25(3)	O	O(1)	O	3(1)	28(4)
Kaori Nagamine	18(13)	O(1)	O	O	3(1)	21(14)
Michiko Matsuda	18(5)	O	O	-	2(0)	20(5)
Midori Honda	18(0)	O	O	O	3(0)	21(0)
Masae Suzuki	18(0)	O	O	O	3(0)	21(0)
Asako Takakura	17(7)	O	O	O	3(0)	20(7)
Akemi Noda	17(2)	O	O	O	3(0)	20(2)
Mayumi Kaji	17(0)	O	O	O	3(0)	20(0)
Takako Tezuka	14(1)	O(1)	O	O	3(1)	17(2)
Chiaki Yamada	12(1)	O	O	-	2(0)	14(1)
Akiko Hayakawa	1(0)	-	-	O	1(0)	2(0)
Yumi Watanabe	0(0)	O	O	-	2(0)	2(0)
Tomoko Matsunaga	0(0)	O	-	O	2(0)	2(0)
Taeko Kawasumi	0(0)	-	O	O	2(0)	2(0)

== Births ==
- 2 June: Takashi Inui
