= 1991 in Japanese football =

1991 season

Japanese football in 1991

== Japan Soccer League ==
=== Division 1 ===
Pos	Team	Pld	W	D	L	GF	GA	GD	Pts	Qualification
1	Yomiuri S.C.	22	15	6	1	43	13	+30	51	Form J.League and 1992–93 Asian Club Championship
2	Nissan Motors	22	12	7	3	25	14	+11	43	Form J.League and 1992–93 Asian Cup Winners' Cup (Note: By winning 1991 Emperor's Cup)
3	Yamaha Motors	22	11	3	8	30	31	−1	36	Form Japan Football League Division 1
4	Toshiba	22	7	9	6	26	24	+2	30	Form Japan Football League Division 1
5	Matsushita Electric	22	7	8	7	25	27	−2	29	Form J.League
6	Mazda	22	7	6	9	30	23	+7	27	Form J.League
7	JR Furukawa	22	8	3	11	30	38	−8	27	Form J.League
8	ANA Club	22	6	7	9	20	23	−3	25	Form J.League
9	Hitachi	22	6	7	9	22	30	−8	25	Form Japan Football League Division 1
10	Honda	22	5	8	9	18	25	−7	23	Form Japan Football League Division 1
11	Mitsubishi Motors	22	5	6	11	25	40	−15	21	Form J.League
12	Toyota Motors	22	4	8	10	24	30	−6	20	Form J.League

=== Division 2 ===
Pos	Team	Pld	W	D	L	GF	GA	GD	Pts	Promotion
1	Fujita Engineering	30	24	2	4	79	17	+62	74	Champions (not promoted, form Japan Football League Division 1)
2	Sumitomo	30	21	2	7	66	24	+42	65	Promoted to new J.League
3	Yanmar Diesel	30	20	5	5	56	17	+39	65	Form Japan Football League Division 1
4	Nippon Kokan	30	18	6	6	51	24	+27	60	Form Japan Football League Division 1
5	Fujitsu	30	17	8	5	46	26	+20	59	Form Japan Football League Division 1
6	Otsuka Pharmaceutical	30	15	5	10	45	32	+13	50	Form Japan Football League Division 1
7	Tokyo Gas	30	12	10	8	30	28	+2	46	Form Japan Football League Division 1
8	Kawasaki Steel	30	12	9	9	31	23	+8	45	Form Japan Football League Division 2
9	NTT Kanto	30	9	6	15	37	44	−7	33	Form Japan Football League Division 2
10	Kofu Club	30	9	6	15	35	66	−31	33	Form Japan Football League Division 2
11	Cosmo Oil Yokkaichi	30	8	5	17	27	53	−26	29	Form Japan Football League Division 2
12	Chuo Bohan	30	7	6	17	33	52	−19	27	Form Japan Football League Division 2
13	Toho Titanium	30	7	6	17	32	59	−27	27	Form Japan Football League Division 2
14	Kyoto Shiko Club	30	5	7	18	21	57	−36	22	Form Japan Football League Division 2
15	Tanabe Pharmaceutical	30	6	3	21	18	50	−32	21	Form Japan Football League Division 2
16	Yomiuri S.C. (Juniors)	30	5	4	21	20	55	−35	19	Folded (Note: Merges with parent club to form Verdy Kawasaki)

== Emperor's Cup ==
January 1, 1992

Nissan Motors	4–1	Yomiuri
Everton (?); Kazushi Kimura (?); Takahiro Yamada (?); Renato (?)		Nobuhiro Takeda (?)

National Stadium

== National team (Men) ==
=== Results ===
1991.06.02	Japan	1–0	Thailand	Yamagata, Japan
	Hashiratani 89'	JFA		Stadium: Yamagata Park Stadium

1991.07.27	Japan	0–1	South Korea	Nagasaki, Japan
		JFA	? (?)	Stadium: Nagasaki Athletic Stadium

=== Players statistics ===
Player	-1990	06.02	07.27	1991	Total
Takumi Horiike	31(1)	O	O	2(0)	33(1)
Shinichi Morishita	27(0)	O	-	1(0)	28(0)
Masami Ihara	22(0)	O	O	2(0)	24(0)
Tetsuji Hashiratani	21(2)	O(1)	O	2(1)	23(3)
Masanao Sasaki	19(0)	O	-	1(0)	20(0)
Shigetatsu Matsunaga	10(0)	-	O	1(0)	11(0)
Nobuhiro Takeda	8(1)	O	O	2(0)	10(1)
Masahiro Fukuda	5(0)	O	O	2(0)	7(0)
Yuji Sakakura	5(0)	-	O	1(0)	6(0)
Ruy Ramos	3(0)	O	O	2(0)	5(0)
Kazuyoshi Miura	3(0)	O	O	2(0)	5(0)
Akihiro Nagashima	3(0)	-	O	1(0)	4(0)
Yasuharu Sorimachi	2(0)	O	O	2(0)	4(0)
Tetsuya Asano	0(0)	O	O	2(0)	2(0)
Tsuyoshi Kitazawa	0(0)	O	O	2(0)	2(0)

== National team (Women) ==
=== Results ===
1991.04.01	Japan	1–3	France	Bulgaria
	Noda (?)		? (?) ? (?) ? (?)

1991.04.03	Japan	2–2	Sweden	Bulgaria
	Noda (?); Mizuma (?)		? (?) ? (?)

1991.04.05	Japan	2–0	Hungary	Bulgaria
	Kioka (?); Takakura (?)

1991.05.26	Japan	1–0	North Korea	Fukuoka, Japan
	Nagamine (?)			Stadium: Heiwadai Athletic Stadium

1991.05.28	Japan	4–1	Hong Kong	Fukuoka, Japan
	Tezuka (?); Nagamine (?); Takakura (?)		? (?)	Stadium: Heiwadai Athletic Stadium

1991.06.01	Japan	12–0	Malaysia	Fukuoka, Japan
	Tezuka (?); Handa (?); Nagamine (?); Noda (?); Mizuma (?)			Stadium: Fukuoka Kasuga Park Stadium

1991.06.03	Japan	10–0	Singapore	Fukuoka, Japan
	Matsuda (?); Tezuka (?); Noda (?); Takakura (?); Yamaguchi (?); Uchiyama (?)			Stadium: Heiwadai Athletic Stadium

1991.06.06	Japan	0–0 (5–4 p)	Chinese Taipei	Fukuoka, Japan
				Stadium: Hakatanomori Athletic Stadium

1991.06.08	Japan	0–5	China	Fukuoka, Japan
			? (?) ? (?) ? (?) ? (?) ? (?)	Stadium: Hakatanomori Athletic Stadium

1991.08.21	Japan	0–0	China	China

1991.11.17	Japan	0–1	Brazil	China
			? (?)

1991.11.19	Japan	0–8	Sweden	China
			? (?) ? (?) ? (?) ? (?) ? (?) ? (?) ? (?) ? (?)

1991.11.21	Japan	0–3	United States	China
			? (?) ? (?) ? (?)

=== Players statistics ===
Player	-1990	04.01	04.03	04.05	05.26	05.28	06.01	06.03	06.06	06.08	08.21	11.17	11.19	11.21	1991	Total
Futaba Kioka	45(25)	O	O	O(1)	-	-	-	-	-	-	-	O	O	O	6(1)	51(26)
Etsuko Handa	43(14)	O	-	O	O	O	O(2)	-	O	O	-	-	-	O	8(2)	51(16)
Kaori Nagamine	37(34)	O	O	-	O(1)	O(1)	O(3)	O	O	O	O	O	O	O	12(5)	49(39)
Mayumi Kaji	36(0)	O	O	O	O	O	O	-	O	O	O	O	O	O	12(0)	48(0)
Masae Suzuki	35(0)	O	O	-	O	O	-	-	O	O	O	O	O	O	10(0)	45(0)
Michiko Matsuda	34(8)	O	O	-	O	O	-	O(2)	O	O	O	O	O	O	11(2)	45(10)
Akemi Noda	34(5)	O(1)	O(1)	O	O	O	O(3)	O(2)	O	O	O	O	O	O	13(7)	47(12)
Midori Honda	34(0)	O	O	-	O	-	-	O	O	-	O	O	O	O	9(0)	43(0)
Takako Tezuka	30(14)	-	O	O	-	O(1)	O(3)	O(1)	O	O	O	O	O	O	11(5)	41(19)
Asako Takakura	30(12)	O	O	O(1)	O	O(2)	-	O(1)	O	O	O	O	O	O	12(4)	42(16)
Yoko Takahagi	27(0)	-	-	O	-	O	O	-	-	O	-	-	-	-	4(0)	31(0)
Sayuri Yamaguchi	19(0)	O	O	-	-	O	O	O(1)	-	-	O	O	O	O	9(1)	28(1)
Yumi Watanabe	17(2)	-	O	O	-	-	-	-	-	-	-	-	-	-	2(0)	19(2)
Tomoko Matsunaga	8(0)	-	-	O	-	O	O	-	O	O	-	-	-	-	5(0)	13(0)
Kyoko Kuroda	6(7)	O	-	O	O	-	O	O	O	O	O	O	O	O	11(0)	17(7)
Yuriko Mizuma	5(3)	O	O(1)	O	O	-	O(1)	O	O	O	O	O	O	-	11(2)	16(5)
Megumi Sakata	3(0)	-	-	O	-	-	O	O	-	-	-	-	-	-	3(0)	6(0)
Noriko Ishibashi	1(1)	-	-	-	-	-	O	O	-	-	-	-	-	-	2(0)	3(1)
Tamaki Uchiyama	0(0)	-	-	-	O	-	O	O(3)	O	O	O	-	-	-	6(3)	6(3)
Ryoko Kobayashi	0(0)	-	-	-	-	-	-	O	-	-	-	-	-	-	1(0)	1(0)
Yumi Obe	0(0)	-	-	-	-	-	-	-	-	-	O	-	-	-	1(0)	1(0)

== Births ==
- 9 May: Genki Haraguchi
