= Chieko =

- Gender: Female

Origin
- Origin: Japanese
- Meaning: Different meanings depending on the kanji used

Chieko (written: 千恵子, 千枝子, 千栄子, 知恵子, 智恵子 or 智栄子) is a feminine Japanese given name. Notable people with the name include:

- Chieko Aioi (相生 千恵子; 1934–2013), Japanese actress and voice actress
- Chieko Akagi (赤木 千恵子; born 1966), Japanese sprint canoeist
- Chieko Asakawa (浅川 智恵子; born 1958), blind Japanese computer scientist
- Chieko Baisho (倍賞 千恵子; born 1941), Japanese actress and singer
- Chieko Hara (原 千恵子; 1914–2001), Japanese pianist
- Chieko Hase (長谷 千恵子; born 1956), Japanese former football player
- Chieko Higashiyama (東山 千栄子; 1890–1980), Japanese stage and film actress
- Chieko Higuchi (樋口 智恵子; born 1981), Japanese voice actress and singer
- Chieko Homma (本間 知恵子; born 1964), Japanese former football player
- Chieko Honda (本多 知恵子; 1963-2013), Japanese voice actress
- Chieko Hosokawa (細川 智栄子; born 1935), Japanese manga artist
- Chieko Ito (伊東 千恵子; born 1954), Japanese speed skater
- Chieko Kawabe (河辺 千恵子; born 1987), Japanese singer, model and actress
- Chieko Kikkawa (吉川 智恵子; born 1955), Japanese gymnast
- Chieko Matsubara (松原 智恵子; born 1945), Japanese actress
- Chieko Matsumoto (松本ちえこ; 1959–2019), Japanese idol, singer and actress
- Chieko Misaki (三崎 千恵子; 1921–2012), Japanese actress and singer
- Chieko Nakakita (中北 千枝子; 1926–2005), Japanese actress
- Chieko Nakanishi (中西 千枝子; born 1966), Japanese volleyball player
- Chieko Naniwa (浪花 千栄子; 1907–1973), Japanese actress
- Chieko Nenaka (根中 千恵子; born 1973), known as Rinka, Japanese fashion model and tarento
- Chieko Nohno (南野 知恵子; born 1935), Japanese politician
- Chieko Oda (小田 千恵子; born 1947), Japanese gymnast
- Chieko N. Okazaki (1926–2011), American leader in the Church of Jesus Christ of Latter-day Saints (LDS Church)
- Chieko Shiratori (白鳥 智恵子; born 1975), Japanese actress
- Chieko Sugawara (菅原 千恵子; born 1976)), Japanese fencer
- Chieko Suzuki (鈴木 智江子; born 1969), known as Dynamite Kansai, Japanese professional wrestler
- Chieko Takamura (高村 智恵子; 1886–1938), Japanese poet
- Chieko Utsumi (1903–1976), Japanese physical educator

== See also ==
- Portrait of Chieko, a 1967 Japanese film
- Chieko, Kenya, a settlement in Central Province, Kenya
