= Akihiro Nishimura =

Akihiro Nishimura may refer to:

- Akihiro Nishimura (politician) (born 1960), Japanese politician of the Liberal Democratic Party
- Akihiro Nishimura (footballer) (born 1958), former Japanese footballer
