= Mihoko Iwaya =

Japanese footballer

Mihoko Iwaya 岩屋 美保子
Personal information
- Full name: Mihoko Iwaya
- Date of birth: June 1, 1964 (age 62)
- Place of birth: Japan
- Position: Goalkeeper

Senior career*
Years	Team	Apps	(Gls)
- Shimizudaihachi SC
- Shizuoka Koki LSC

International career
1981	Japan	2	(0)
- * Club domestic league appearances and goals

Mihoko Iwaya (岩屋 美保子, Iwaya Mihoko; born June 1, 1964) is a former Japanese football player. She played for Japan national team.

== National team career ==
Iwaya was born on June 1, 1964. In June 1981, when she was 17 years old, she was selected for the Japan national team for the 1981 AFC Championship. At this competition, on June 13, she debuted against Indonesia and Japan won this match (1-0). That was the Japan team's first victory. She played two games for Japan, including that competition in 1981.

== National team statistics ==
Japan national team
Year	Apps	Goals
1981	2	0
Total	2	0
