= Maho Shimizu =

Japanese footballer

Maho Shimizu 清水 万帆
Personal information
- Full name: Maho Shimizu
- Date of birth: March 9, 1960 (age 66)
- Place of birth: Japan
- Position: Midfielder

Senior career*
Years	Team	Apps	(Gls)
- Tasaki-Shinju Kobe

International career
1981	Japan	3	(0)
- * Club domestic league appearances and goals

Maho Shimizu (清水 万帆, Shimizu Maho; born March 9, 1960) is a former Japanese football player. She played for Japan national team.

== National team career ==
Shimizu was born on March 9, 1960. In June 1981, she was selected Japan national team for 1981 AFC Championship. At this competition, on June 7, she debuted against Chinese Taipei. This match is Japan team first match in International A Match. She played in 2 matches at this championship. She played 3 games for Japan include this competition in 1981.

== National team statistics ==
Japan national team
Year	Apps	Goals
1981	3	0
Total	3	0
