= Miho Kaneda =

Japanese footballer

Miho Kaneda 金田 美保
Personal information
- Full name: Miho Kaneda
- Place of birth: Japan
- Position: Forward

Senior career*
Years	Team	Apps	(Gls)
- Shimizudaihachi SC

International career
1981	Japan	5	(0)
- * Club domestic league appearances and goals

Miho Kaneda (金田 美保, Kaneda Miho) is a former Japanese football player. She played for the Japan national team.

== Club career ==
Kaneda played for Shimizudaihachi SC. The club won the 1980 Empress's Cup and she was selected for the MVP award.

== National team career ==
In June 1981, Kaneda was selected for the Japan national team for the 1981 AFC Championship. At this competition on June 7, she debuted against Chinese Taipei. That match was Japan's first match in an International A Match. She played in all three matches at the championship. In September, she also played in two matches against England and Italy. However Japan was defeated by a score of 0–9 against Italy. That was the biggest defeat in the history of the Japan national team. She played five games for Japan in 1981.

== National team statistics ==
Japan national team
Year	Apps	Goals
1981	5	0
Total	5	0
