= Akemi Iwata =

Japanese footballer

Akemi Iwata 岩田 明美
Personal information
- Full name: Akemi Iwata
- Date of birth: January 19, 1954 (age 72)
- Place of birth: Japan
- Position: Defender

Senior career*
Years	Team	Apps	(Gls)
- FC Jinnan

International career
1981	Japan	3	(0)
- * Club domestic league appearances and goals

Akemi Iwata (岩田 明美, Iwata Akemi; born January 19, 1954) is a former Japanese football player. She played for Japan national team.

== National team career ==
Iwata was born on January 19, 1954. In June 1981, when she was 17 years old, she was selected for the Japan national team to play in the 1981 AFC Championship. She debuted against Thailand at this competition on June 11. She played in two matches at this championship. In September, she also played against Italy. However Japan was defeated by a score of 0–9. That was the greatest defeat in the history of the Japan national team. She played three games for Japan in 1981.

== National team statistics ==
Japan national team
Year	Apps	Goals
1981	3	0
Total	3	0
