= Masuyo Shiraishi =

Japanese footballer

Masuyo Shiraishi 白石 益代
Personal information
- Full name: Masuyo Shiraishi
- Date of birth: September 24, 1963 (age 63)
- Place of birth: Japan
- Position: Defender

Youth career
- Nishiyama High School

International career
| Years | Team | Apps | (Gls) |
| 1981 | Japan | 4 | (0) |

Masuyo Shiraishi (白石 益代, Shiraishi Masuyo; born September 24, 1964) is a former Japanese football player. She played for Japan national team.

== National team career ==
Shiraishi was born on September 24, 1964. In June 1981, when she was 17 years old, she was selected Japan national team for 1981 AFC Championship. At this competition, on June 7, she debuted against Chinese Taipei. This match is Japan team first match in International A Match. She played in all 3 matches at this championship. She played 4 games for Japan include this competition in 1981.

== National team statistics ==
Japan national team
| Year | Apps | Goals |
|---|---|---|
| 1981 | 4 | 0 |
| Total | 4 | 0 |
