= Shiho Kaneda =

Japanese footballer

Shiho Kaneda 金田 志保
Personal information
- Full name: Shiho Kaneda
- Date of birth: March 11, 1965 (age 61)
- Place of birth: Japan
- Position: Defender

Senior career*
Years	Team	Apps	(Gls)
- Shimizudaihachi SC

International career
1981	Japan	4	(0)
- * Club domestic league appearances and goals

Shiho Kaneda (金田 志保, Kaneda Shiho; born March 11, 1965) is a former Japanese football player. She played for Japan national team.

== National team career ==
Kaneda was born on March 11, 1965. In June 1981, when she was 16 years old, she was selected for the Japan national team for the 1981 AFC Championship. On June 7, she debuted against Chinese Taipei. That match was Japan's first match in an International A Match. She played in two matches during that championship. In September, she also played in two matches against England and Italy. However Japan was defeated by a score of 0–9 against Italy. That was the biggest defeat in the history of the Japan national team. She played in four games for Japan in 1981.

== National team statistics ==
Japan national team
Year	Apps	Goals
1981	4	0
Total	4	0
