= Junko Ishida =

Japanese footballer

Junko Ishida 石田 順子
Personal information
- Full name: Junko Ishida
- Date of birth: March 11, 1966 (age 60)
- Place of birth: Japan
- Position: Forward

Youth career
- Nishiyama High School

Senior career*
Years	Team	Apps	(Gls)
- Nishiyama High School Club

International career
1981	Japan	3	(0)
- * Club domestic league appearances and goals

Junko Ishida (石田 順子, Ishida Junko; born March 11, 1966) is a former Japanese football player. She played for the Japan national team.

== National team career ==
Ishida was born on March 11, 1966. In June 1981, when she was 15 years old, she was selected by the Japan national team for the 1981 AFC Championship. At this competition, on June 7, she debuted against Chinese Taipei. This match was the Japan team's first match in an International A Match. She played in two matches at this championship. She played three games for Japan, including this competition, in 1981.

== National team statistics ==
Japan national team
Year	Apps	Goals
1981	3	0
Total	3	0
