= Sanae Mishima =

Japanese footballer

Sanae Mishima 三島 早苗
Personal information
- Full name: Sanae Mishima
- Date of birth: May 3, 1957 (age 69)
- Place of birth: Japan
- Position: Midfielder

Youth career
- Jissen Women's University

Senior career*
Years	Team	Apps	(Gls)
- FC PAF

International career
1981	Japan	2	(0)
- * Club domestic league appearances and goals

Sanae Mishima (三島 早苗, Mishima Sanae; born May 3, 1957) is a former Japanese football player. She played for Japan national team.

== National team career ==
Mishima was born on May 3, 1957. In June 1981, she was selected Japan national team for 1981 AFC Championship. At this competition, on June 11, she debuted against Thailand. In September, she also played against Italy. However Japan was defeated this match by a score of 0–9. This is the biggest defeat in the history of Japan national team. She played 2 games for Japan in 1981.

== National team statistics ==
Japan national team
Year	Apps	Goals
1981	2	0
Total	2	0
