= Yuriko Shima =

Japanese footballer

Yuriko Shima 島 由理子
Personal information
- Full name: Yuriko Shima
- Date of birth: July 12, 1959 (age 67)
- Place of birth: Japan
- Position: Midfielder

Senior career*
Years	Team	Apps	(Gls)
- FC Jinnan

International career
1981	Japan	4	(0)
- * Club domestic league appearances and goals

Yuriko Shima (島 由理子, Shima Yuriko; born July 12, 1959) is a former Japanese football player. She played for Japan national team.

== Club career ==
Shima was born on July 12, 1959. She played for FC Jinnan. The club won 1979 Empress's Cup. At the final, she scored a winning goal and was selected MVP awards.

== National team career ==
In June 1981, Shima was selected Japan national team for 1981 AFC Championship. At this competition, on June 7, she debuted against Chinese Taipei. This match is Japan team first match in International A Match. She played in all 3 matches at this championship. In September, she also played against Italy. However Japan was defeated this match by a score of 0–9. This is the biggest defeat in the history of Japan national team. She played 4 games for Japan in 1981.

== National team statistics ==
Japan national team
Year	Apps	Goals
1981	4	0
Total	4	0
