= Nobuko Kondo =

Japanese footballer

Nobuko Kondo 近藤 修子
Personal information
- Full name: Nobuko Kondo
- Date of birth: December 1, 1956 (age 69)
- Place of birth: Japan
- Position: Defender

Senior career*
Years	Team	Apps	(Gls)
- FC Jinnan

International career
1981	Japan	4	(0)
- * Club domestic league appearances and goals

Nobuko Kondo (近藤 修子, Kondo Nobuko; born December 1, 1956) is a former Japanese football player. She played for Japan national team.

== National team career ==
Kondo was born on December 1, 1956. In June 1981, she was selected by the Japan national team for the 1981 AFC Championship. She debuted against Chinese Taipei on June 7. That match was the Japan team's first International A Match. She played in all three matches during the championship tournament. In September, she played against Italy. However Japan was defeated by a score of 0–9. That was the worst defeat in the history of the Japan national team. She played four games for Japan in 1981.

== National team statistics ==
Japan national team
Year	Apps	Goals
1981	4	0
Total	4	0
