= Chieko Hase =

Japanese footballer

Chieko Hase 長谷 千恵子
Personal information
- Full name: Chieko Hase
- Date of birth: October 25, 1956 (age 70)
- Place of birth: Japan
- Position: Goalkeeper

Senior career*
Years	Team	Apps	(Gls)
- Yowa Ladies

International career
1981	Japan	3	(0)
- * Club domestic league appearances and goals

Chieko Hase (長谷 千恵子, Hase Chieko; born October 25, 1956) is a former Japanese football player. She played for the Japan national team.

== National team career ==
Hase was born on October 25, 1956. In June 1981, she was selected Japan national team for 1981 AFC Championship. At this competition, on June 7, she debuted against Chinese Taipei. This was the Japan team's first match in an International A Match. She played in two matches at this championship. In September, she also played against Italy. However Japan was defeated in this match by a score of 0–9. This was the biggest defeat in the history of the Japan national team. She played three games for Japan in 1981.

== National team statistics ==
Japan national team
Year	Apps	Goals
1981	3	0
Total	3	0
