= Chieko Homma =

Japanese footballer

Chieko Homma 本間 知恵子
Personal information
- Full name: Chieko Homma
- Date of birth: November 5, 1964 (age 62)
- Place of birth: Japan
- Position: Defender

Senior career*
Years	Team	Apps	(Gls)
- Shimizudaihachi SC
- Shizuoka Koki LSC

International career
1981	Japan	3	(0)
- * Club domestic league appearances and goals

Chieko Homma (本間 知恵子, Honma Chieko; born November 5, 1964) is a former Japanese football player. She played for Japan national team.

== Club career ==
Homma was born on November 5, 1964. She played for Shimizudaihachi SC and Shizuoka Koki LSC.

== National team career ==
In June 1981, Homma was selected by the Japan national team for the 1981 AFC Championship. At this competition, on June 7, she debuted against Chinese Taipei. This match was the Japan team's first match in an International A Match. She played three games for Japan in 1981.

== National team statistics ==
Japan national team
Year	Apps	Goals
1981	3	0
Total	3	0
