= Japan women's national football team results (1981–1989) =

This page records the details of the Japan women's national football team from 1981 to 1989.

== 1981 ==
=== Results ===
1981.06.07	Japan	0–1	Chinese Taipei	Hong Kong
			? (?)

1981.06.11	Japan	0–2	Thailand	Hong Kong
			? (?) ? (?)

1981.06.13	Japan	1–0	Indonesia	Hong Kong
	Handa (?)

1981.09.06	Japan	0–4	England	Hyogo, Japan
			? (?) ? (?) ? (?) ? (?)	Stadium: Kobe Central Stadium

1981.09.09	Japan	0–9	Italy	Tokyo, Japan
			? (?) ? (?) ? (?) ? (?) ? (?) ? (?) ? (?) ? (?) ? (?)	Stadium: Nishigaoka Soccer Stadium

=== Players statistics ===
Player	−1980	06.07	06.11	06.13	09.06	09.09	1981	Total
Etsuko Handa	0(0)	O	O	O(1)	O	O	5(1)	5(1)
Midori Honda	0(0)	O	O	O	O	O	5(0)	5(0)
Futaba Kioka	0(0)	O	O	O	O	O	5(0)	5(0)
Miho Kaneda	0(0)	O	O	O	O	O	5(0)	5(0)
Masuyo Shiraishi	0(0)	O	O	O	O	-	4(0)	4(0)
Nobuko Kondo	0(0)	O	O	O	-	O	4(0)	4(0)
Yuriko Shima	0(0)	O	O	O	-	O	4(0)	4(0)
Shiho Kaneda	0(0)	O	-	O	O	O	4(0)	4(0)
Chieko Homma	0(0)	O	O	O	-	-	3(0)	3(0)
Maho Shimizu	0(0)	O	O	-	O	-	3(0)	3(0)
Chieko Hase	0(0)	O	O	-	-	O	3(0)	3(0)
Junko Ishida	0(0)	O	-	O	O	-	3(0)	3(0)
Akemi Iwata	0(0)	-	O	O	-	O	3(0)	3(0)
Sanae Mishima	0(0)	-	O	-	-	O	2(0)	2(0)
Mihoko Iwaya	0(0)	-	-	O	O	-	2(0)	2(0)
Sayuri Yamaguchi	0(0)	-	-	-	O	O	2(0)	2(0)
Nobuko Jashima	0(0)	-	-	-	O	-	1(0)	1(0)
Kaoru Kakinami	0(0)	-	-	-	O	-	1(0)	1(0)
Michiko Matsuda	0(0)	-	-	-	O	-	1(0)	1(0)
Mayumi Kaji	0(0)	-	-	-	O	-	1(0)	1(0)
Emiko Kubo	0(0)	-	-	-	O	-	1(0)	1(0)
Tomoko Ohara	0(0)	-	-	-	-	O	1(0)	1(0)
Masako Yoshida	0(0)	-	-	-	-	O	1(0)	1(0)

== 1984 ==
=== Results ===
1984.10.17	Japan	0–6	Italy	China
			? (?) ? (?) ? (?) ? (?) ? (?) ? (?)

1984.10.22	Japan	2–6	Australia	China
	Matsuda (?)		? (?) ? (?) ? (?) ? (?) ? (?) ? (?)

1984.10.24	Japan	1–5	Italy	China
	Kioka (?)		? (?) ? (?) ? (?) ? (?) ? (?)

=== Players statistics ===
Player	−1983	10.17	10.22	10.24	1984	Total
Etsuko Handa	5(1)	O	O	O	3(0)	8(1)
Futaba Kioka	5(0)	O	O	O(1)	3(1)	8(1)
Midori Honda	5(0)	O	O	O	3(0)	8(0)
Sayuri Yamaguchi	2(0)	O	O	O	3(0)	5(0)
Michiko Matsuda	1(0)	O	O(2)	O	3(2)	4(2)
Kaoru Kakinami	1(0)	O	O	O	3(0)	4(0)
Emiko Kubo	1(0)	O	O	O	3(0)	4(0)
Keiko Saito	0(0)	O	O	O	3(0)	3(0)
Kimiko Shiratori	0(0)	O	O	O	3(0)	3(0)
Kazuko Hironaka	0(0)	O	O	O	3(0)	3(0)
Asako Takakura	0(0)	O	O	O	3(0)	3(0)
Chiaki Yamada	0(0)	O	-	O	2(0)	2(0)
Mami Kaneda	0(0)	-	O	O	2(0)	2(0)
Akemi Noda	0(0)	O	-	-	1(0)	1(0)
Kaori Nagamine	0(0)	-	O	-	1(0)	1(0)
Masae Suzuki	0(0)	-	-	O	1(0)	1(0)

== 1986 ==
=== Results ===
1986.01.21	Japan	0–1	India	South Jakarta, Indonesia
			Anita Sarkar 3'	Stadium: Kuningan Students' Stadium

1986.01.26	Japan	7–0	India	South Jakarta, Indonesia
	Akemi Noda 14'; Kaori Nagamine 23', 47', 61'; Futaba Kioka 43'; Etsuko Handa 57', 59'			Stadium: Senayan Main Stadium

1986.03.07	Japan	0–2	Chinese Taipei	Tokyo, Japan
			? (?) ? (?)	Stadium: Nishigaoka Soccer Stadium

1986.07.19	Japan	1–5	Italy	Italy
	Takakura (?)		? (?) ? (?) ? (?) ? (?) ? (?)

1986.07.21	Japan	3–0	Mexico	Italy
	Kioka (?); Nagamine (?)

1986.07.25	Japan	1–3	United States	Italy
	Kioka (?)		? (?) ? (?) ? (?)

1986.07.26	Japan	1–2	China	Italy
	Matsuda (?)		? (?) ? (?)

1986.09.18	Japan	1–2	Italy	Tokyo, Japan
	Kioka (?)		? (?) ? (?)	Stadium: Nishigaoka Soccer Stadium

1986.09.23	Japan	2–3	Italy	Tokyo, Japan
	Nagamine (?)		? (?) ? (?) ? (?)	Stadium: National Stadium

1986.12.14	Japan	0–2	China	Hong Kong
			? (?) ? (?)

1986.12.18	Japan	10–0	Malaysia	Hong Kong
	Kioka (?); Tezuka (?); Nagamine (?); Takakura (?); Matsuda (?)

1986.12.21	Japan	4–0	Thailand	Hong Kong
	Kioka (?); Nagamine (?); Noda (?); Matsuda (?)

1986.12.23	Japan	0–2	China	Hong Kong
			? (?) ? (?)

=== Players statistics ===
Player	−1985	01.21	01.26	03.07	07.19	07.21	07.25	07.26	09.18	09.23	12.14	12.18	12.21	12.23	1986	Total
Futaba Kioka	8(1)	O	O(1)	O	O	O(1)	O(1)	O	O(1)	O	O	O(2)	O(1)	O	13(7)	21(8)
Etsuko Handa	8(1)	O	O(2)	O	O	O	O	O	O	O	O	O	O	O	13(2)	21(3)
Midori Honda	8(0)	O	O	-	-	-	-	-	O	-	-	O	O	O	6(0)	14(0)
Sayuri Yamaguchi	5(0)	O	O	O	O	O	O	O	O	O	O	O	O	O	13(0)	18(0)
Michiko Matsuda	4(2)	-	-	-	O	O	O	O(1)	O	O	O	O(1)	O(1)	O	10(3)	14(5)
Asako Takakura	3(0)	O	O	-	O(1)	O	-	O	O	O	O	O(2)	O	O	11(3)	14(3)
Kazuko Hironaka	3(0)	-	-	-	O	O	O	O	O	O	O	O	O	O	10(0)	13(0)
Kimiko Shiratori	3(0)	O	-	O	-	-	-	-	-	-	-	-	-	-	2(0)	5(0)
Chiaki Yamada	2(0)	O	O	O	O	-	O	O	-	-	-	-	-	-	6(0)	8(0)
Mami Kaneda	2(0)	O	-	-	-	-	-	-	-	-	-	-	-	-	1(0)	3(0)
Kaori Nagamine	1(0)	O	O(3)	O	O	O(2)	O	O	O	O(2)	O	O(4)	O(1)	O	13(12)	14(12)
Masae Suzuki	1(0)	O	O	O	O	O	O	O	O	O	O	O	O	O	13(0)	14(0)
Akemi Noda	1(0)	O	O(1)	O	O	O	O	-	O	O	O	O	O(1)	O	12(2)	13(2)
Mayumi Kaji	1(0)	-	O	O	O	O	O	O	O	O	O	O	O	O	12(0)	13(0)
Yoko Takahagi	0(0)	O	O	O	O	O	O	O	O	O	O	O	O	O	13(0)	13(0)
Takako Tezuka	0(0)	-	-	O	-	O	O	O	O	O	O	O(1)	O	O	10(1)	10(1)
Yuko Oita	0(0)	O	O	-	-	-	-	-	-	-	-	-	-	-	2(0)	2(0)
Shoko Hamada	0(0)	O	-	O	-	-	-	-	-	-	-	-	-	-	2(0)	2(0)
Tomomi Seo	0(0)	O	-	-	-	-	-	-	-	-	-	-	-	-	1(0)	1(0)

== 1987 ==
=== Results ===
1987.08.04	Japan	1–3	Chinese Taipei	Chinese Taipei
	Takakura (?)		? (?) ? (?) ? (?)

1987.08.09	Japan	1–2	Chinese Taipei	Chinese Taipei
	Yamada (?)		? (?) ? (?)

1987.12.12	Japan	0–1	United States	Chinese Taipei
			? (?)

1987.12.15	Japan	5–0	Hong Kong	Chinese Taipei
	Kioka (?); Nagamine (?); Takakura (?)

=== Players statistics ===
Player	−1986	08.04	08.09	12.12	12.15	1987	Total
Futaba Kioka	21(8)	O	O	O	O(1)	4(1)	25(9)
Etsuko Handa	21(3)	O	O	O	O	4(0)	25(3)
Kaori Nagamine	14(12)	O	O	O	O(1)	4(1)	18(13)
Michiko Matsuda	14(5)	O	O	O	O	4(0)	18(5)
Asako Takakura	14(3)	O(1)	O	-	O(3)	3(4)	17(7)
Midori Honda	14(0)	O	O	O	O	4(0)	18(0)
Masae Suzuki	14(0)	O	O	O	O	4(0)	18(0)
Akemi Noda	13(2)	O	O	O	O	4(0)	17(2)
Mayumi Kaji	13(0)	O	O	O	O	4(0)	17(0)
Yoko Takahagi	13(0)	O	O	-	-	2(0)	15(0)
Kazuko Hironaka	13(0)	-	-	O	O	2(0)	15(0)
Takako Tezuka	10(1)	O	O	O	O	4(0)	14(1)
Chiaki Yamada	8(0)	O	O(1)	O	O	4(1)	12(1)
Yuko Oita	2(0)	-	-	-	O	1(0)	3(0)
Akiko Hayakawa	0(0)	O	-	-	-	1(0)	1(0)

== 1988 ==
=== Results ===
1988.06.01	Japan	2–5	United States	China
	Nagamine (?); Tezuka (?)		? (?) ? (?) ? (?) ? (?) ? (?)

1988.06.03	Japan	1–2	Czechoslovakia	China
	Handa (?)		? (?) ? (?)

1988.06.05	Japan	0–3	Sweden	China
			? (?) ? (?) ? (?)

=== Players statistics ===
Player	−1987	06.01	06.03	06.05	1988	Total
Futaba Kioka	25(9)	O	O	O	3(0)	28(9)
Etsuko Handa	25(3)	O	O(1)	O	3(1)	28(4)
Kaori Nagamine	18(13)	O(1)	O	O	3(1)	21(14)
Michiko Matsuda	18(5)	O	O	-	2(0)	20(5)
Midori Honda	18(0)	O	O	O	3(0)	21(0)
Masae Suzuki	18(0)	O	O	O	3(0)	21(0)
Asako Takakura	17(7)	O	O	O	3(0)	20(7)
Akemi Noda	17(2)	O	O	O	3(0)	20(2)
Mayumi Kaji	17(0)	O	O	O	3(0)	20(0)
Takako Tezuka	14(1)	O(1)	O	O	3(1)	17(2)
Chiaki Yamada	12(1)	O	O	-	2(0)	14(1)
Akiko Hayakawa	1(0)	-	-	O	1(0)	2(0)
Yumi Watanabe	0(0)	O	O	-	2(0)	2(0)
Tomoko Matsunaga	0(0)	O	-	O	2(0)	2(0)
Taeko Kawasumi	0(0)	-	O	O	2(0)	2(0)

== 1989 ==
=== Results ===
1989.01.12	Japan	0–1	Finland	China
			? (?)

1989.01.14	Japan	13–0	Philippines	China
	Kioka (?); Nagamine (?); Tezuka (?); Kuroda (?); Watanabe (?)

1989.01.16	Japan	0–4	China	China
			? (?) ? (?) ? (?) ? (?)

1989.12.02	Japan	2–2	Australia	Kanagawa, Japan
	Nagamine (?)		? (?) ? (?)	Stadium: Hiratsuka Stadium

1989.12.04	Japan	1–1	Australia	Chiba, Japan
	Kioka (?)		? (?)	Stadium: Akitsu Park Soccer Stadium

1989.12.19	Japan	11–0	Indonesia	Hong Kong
	Kioka (?); Handa (?); Nagamine (?); Takakura (?); Tezuka (?)

1989.12.22	Japan	3–0	Hong Kong	Hong Kong
	Nagamine (?); Noda (?); Yamada (?)

1989.12.24	Japan	14–0	Nepal	Hong Kong
	(?); Handa (?); Nagamine (?); Ishibashi (?); Kuroda (?); Yamada (?); Kioka (?); Hironaka (?)

1989.12.26	Japan	0–1	Chinese Taipei	Hong Kong
			? (?)

1989.12.29	Japan	9–0	Hong Kong	Hong Kong
	Kioka (?); Handa (?); Watanabe (?); Matsuda (?)

=== Players statistics ===
Player	−1988	01.12	01.14	01.16	12.02	12.04	12.19	12.22	12.24	12.26	12.29	1989	Total
Futaba Kioka	28(9)	O	O(1)	O	O	O(1)	O(1)	O	O(2)	O	O(4)	10(9)	38(18)
Etsuko Handa	28(4)	O	-	O	O	O	O(1)	O	O(2)	O	O(3)	9(6)	37(10)
Kaori Nagamine	21(14)	O	O(2)	O	O(2)	O	O(4)	O(1)	O(4)	O	O	10(13)	31(27)
Masae Suzuki	21(0)	O	O	O	O	O	O	O	-	O	O	9(0)	30(0)
Midori Honda	21(0)	O	-	O	O	O	O	O	-	O	O	8(0)	29(0)
Asako Takakura	20(7)	O	-	O	O	O	O(3)	-	O	-	-	6(3)	26(10)
Michiko Matsuda	20(5)	O	O	O	O	O	O	O	-	O	O(1)	9(1)	29(6)
Akemi Noda	20(2)	O	O	O	-	-	-	O(1)	O	O	O	7(1)	27(3)
Mayumi Kaji	20(0)	O	O	O	O	O	O	O	-	O	O	9(0)	29(0)
Takako Tezuka	17(2)	O	O(4)	O	O	O	O(2)	O	-	O	O	9(6)	26(8)
Yoko Takahagi	15(0)	-	-	-	O	O	O	O	O	-	O	6(0)	21(0)
Kazuko Hironaka	15(0)	-	-	-	O	-	O	-	O(2)	-	-	3(2)	18(2)
Chiaki Yamada	14(1)	-	O	O	O	-	-	O(1)	O(1)	O	O	7(2)	21(3)
Yumi Watanabe	2(0)	O	O(1)	O	O	O	O	-	O	O	O(1)	9(2)	11(2)
Tomoko Matsunaga	2(0)	-	O	-	-	-	-	O	O	-	O	4(0)	6(0)
Kyoko Kuroda	0(0)	O	O(5)	O	-	-	-	-	O(1)	-	-	4(6)	4(6)
Noriko Ishibashi	0(0)	-	-	-	-	-	-	-	O(1)	-	-	1(1)	1(1)
Megumi Sakata	0(0)	-	-	-	-	-	-	-	O	-	-	1(0)	1(0)
