= 1990 L.League =

L. League
- Season: 1990
- Champions: Yomiuri SC Ladies Beleza; 1st L. League title
- Top goalscorer: Akemi Noda (16 goals)

Statistics of L. League in the 1990 season. Yomiuri SC Ladies Beleza won the championship.

== JLSL League standings ==
Pos	Team	Pld	W	D	L	GF	GA	GD	Pts	Qualification
1	Yomiuri SC Ladies Beleza	15	14	1	0	52	4	+48	29	Champions
2	Suzuyo Shimizu FC Lovely Ladies	15	10	2	3	39	18	+21	22	
3	Prima Ham FC Kunoichi	15	5	5	5	14	19	−5	15	
4	Nissan FC Ladies	15	3	5	7	21	35	−14	11	
5	Shinko Seiko FC Clair	15	3	2	10	17	34	−17	8	
6	Tasaki-Shinju Kobe Ladies	15	2	1	12	6	39	−33	5	

== League awards ==
=== Best player ===
Player	Club
(Japan) Akemi Noda	Yomiuri SC Ladies Beleza

=== Top scorers ===
Rank	Scorer	Club	Goals
1	(Japan) Akemi Noda	Yomiuri SC Ladies Beleza	16

=== Best eleven ===
Pos	Player	Club
GK	(Japan) Yumi Furuki	Prima Ham FC Kunoichi
DF	(Japan) Chiaki Shimamura	Yomiuri SC Ladies Beleza
DF	(Japan) Midori Honda	Yomiuri SC Ladies Beleza
DF	(Japan) Mayumi Nakayama	Suzuyo Shimizu FC Lovely Ladies
MF	(Japan) Akiko Hayakawa	Yomiuri SC Ladies Beleza
MF	(Japan) Futaba Kioka	Suzuyo Shimizu FC Lovely Ladies
MF	(Japan) Michiko Matsuda	Prima Ham FC Kunoichi
FW	(Japan) Akemi Noda	Yomiuri SC Ladies Beleza
FW	(Japan) Takako Tezuka	Yomiuri SC Ladies Beleza
FW	(Japan) Etsuko Handa	Suzuyo Shimizu FC Lovely Ladies
FW	(Japan) Kaori Nagamine	Shinko Seiko FC Clair

=== Best young player ===
Player	Club
(Japan) Shiho Onodera	Yomiuri SC Ladies Beleza

== See also ==
- Empress's Cup
