= Chieko Nakanishi =

Japanese volleyball player

Personal information
- Born: 24 August 1966 (age 60); Ashiya, Fukuoka, Japan
- Height: 1.63 m (5 ft 4 in)

Volleyball information
- Position: Setter
- Number: 4 (1992); 1 (1996)

National team
1986–1996	Japan

Chieko Nakanishi (中西 千枝子, Nakanishi Chieko; born 24 August 1966) is a Japanese former volleyball player who competed in the 1992 Summer Olympics and the 1996 Summer Olympics.

In 1992, Nakanishi finished fifth with the Japanese team in the Olympic tournament in Barcelona.

Four years later, Nakanishi was eliminated with the Japanese team in the preliminary round of the 1996 Olympic tournament in Atlanta.
