= Shoko Hamada (footballer) =

Japanese footballer

Shoko Hamada 浜田 彰子
Personal information
- Full name: Shoko Hamada
- Place of birth: Japan
- Position: Midfielder

International career
Years	Team	Apps	(Gls)
1986	Japan	2	(0)

Shoko Hamada (浜田 彰子, Hamada Shōko) is a former Japanese football player. She played for Japan national team.

== National team career ==
On January 21, 1986, Hamada debuted for Japan national team against India. She played two games for Japan in 1986.

== National team statistics ==
Japan national team
Year	Apps	Goals
1986	2	0
Total	2	0
