= Emiko Kubo =

Japanese footballer

Emiko Kubo 久保 恵美子
Personal information
- Full name: Emiko Kubo
- Date of birth: December 28, 1966 (age 59)
- Place of birth: Osaka, Japan
- Position: Defender

Senior career*
Years	Team	Apps	(Gls)
- Takatsuki Ladies FC
- Nishiyama High School Club
- Takatsuki Ladies FC

International career
1981–1984	Japan	4	(0)
- * Club domestic league appearances and goals

Emiko Kubo (久保 恵美子, Kubo Emiko; born December 28, 1966) is a former Japanese football player. She played for Japan national team.

== Club career ==
Kubo was born in Osaka Prefecture on December 28, 1966. When she was junior high school student, she played for Takatsuki Ladies FC. The club won the 2nd place in 1979 Empress's Cup. When she was high school student, she played for Nishiyama High School Club. After graduating from high school, she returned to Takatsuki Ladies FC. When she was 23 years old, she got married and retired from playing career.

== National team career ==
On September 6, 1981, when Kubo was 14 years and 262 days, she debuted for Japan national team against England. It made her the youngest player who represented Japan. She played 4 games for Japan until 1984.

== National team statistics ==
Japan national team
Year	Apps	Goals
1981	1	0
1982	0	0
1983	0	0
1984	3	0
Total	4	0
