= Kaoru Kakinami =

Japanese footballer (born 1966)

Kaoru Kakinami 柿並 薫
Personal information
- Full name: Kaoru Kakinami
- Date of birth: May 7, 1966 (age 60)
- Place of birth: Japan
- Position: Midfielder

Senior career*
Years	Team	Apps	(Gls)
- Takatsuki Ladies FC

International career
1981–1984	Japan	4	(0)
- * Club domestic league appearances and goals

Kaoru Kakinami (柿並 薫, Kakinami Kaoru; born May 7, 1966) is a former Japanese football player. She played for Japan national team.

== National team career ==
Kakinami was born on May 7, 1966. On September 6, 1981, when she was 15 years old, she debuted for Japan national team against England. She played 4 games for Japan until 1984.

== National team statistics ==
Japan national team
Year	Apps	Goals
1981	1	0
1982	0	0
1983	0	0
1984	3	0
Total	4	0
