= Noriko Ishibashi =

Japanese footballer

Noriko Ishibashi 石橋 紀子
Personal information
- Full name: Noriko Ishibashi
- Date of birth: May 5, 1970 (age 56)
- Place of birth: Japan
- Position: Forward

Senior career*
Years	Team	Apps	(Gls)
- Prima Ham FC Kunoichi

International career
1989–1991	Japan	3	(1)
Medal record
Representing Japan
AFC Women's Asian Cup
Silver medal – second place	1991 Japan
Bronze medal – third place	1989 Hong Kong
- * Club domestic league appearances and goals

Noriko Ishibashi (石橋 紀子, Ishibashi Noriko; born May 5, 1970) is a former Japanese football player. She played for Japan national team.

== National team career ==
Ishibashi was born on May 5, 1970. In December 1989, she was selected Japan national team for 1989 AFC Championship. At this competition, on December 24, she debuted and scored a goal against Nepal. She also played at 1991 AFC Championship. This competition was her last game for Japan. She played 3 games and scored 1 goal for Japan until 1991.

== National team statistics ==
Japan national team
Year	Apps	Goals
1989	1	1
1990	0	0
1991	2	0
Total	3	1
