= Mami Kaneda =

Japanese footballer

Mami Kaneda 金田 真美
Personal information
- Full name: Mami Kaneda
- Date of birth: March 9, 1968 (age 58)
- Place of birth: Japan
- Position: Midfielder

Senior career*
Years	Team	Apps	(Gls)
- Shimizudaihachi SC
- Nissan FC

International career
1984–1986	Japan	3	(0)
- * Club domestic league appearances and goals

Mami Kaneda (金田 真美, Kaneda Mami; born March 9, 1968) is a former Japanese football player. She played for Japan national team.

== Club career ==
Kaneda was born on March 9, 1968. She played for Shimizudaihachi SC and Nissan FC.

== National team career ==
On October 22, 1984, Kaneda debuted for the Japan national team against Australia when she was 16 years old. She played 3 games for Japan until 1986.

== National team statistics ==
Japan national team
Year	Apps	Goals
1984	2	0
1985	0	0
1986	1	0
Total	3	0
