= Yuko Oita =

Japanese footballer

Yuko Oita 尾板 裕子
Personal information
- Full name: Yuko Oita
- Date of birth: August 3, 1969 (age 57)
- Place of birth: Japan
- Position: Forward

Senior career*
Years	Team	Apps	(Gls)
- Kobe FC
- Nikko Securities Dream Ladies
- Shiroki FC Serena
- Takarazuka Bunnys

International career
1986–1987	Japan	3	(0)
- * Club domestic league appearances and goals

Yuko Oita (尾板 裕子, Oita Yuko; born August 3, 1969) is a former Japanese football player. She played for Japan national team.

== Club career ==
Oita was born on August 3, 1969. She played for Kobe FC, Nikko Securities Dream Ladies, Shiroki FC Serena and Takarazuka Bunnys.

== National team career ==
On January 21, 1986, when Oita was 16 years old, she debuted for Japan national team against India. She played 3 games for Japan until 1987.

== National team statistics ==
Japan national team
Year	Apps	Goals
1986	2	0
1987	1	0
Total	3	0
