= Kimiko Shiratori =

Japanese footballer

Kimiko Shiratori 白鳥 公子
Personal information
- Full name: Kimiko Shiratori
- Date of birth: June 6, 1968 (age 58)
- Place of birth: Japan
- Position: Defender

Senior career*
Years	Team	Apps	(Gls)
- Shimizudaihachi SC

International career
1984–1986	Japan	5	(0)
- * Club domestic league appearances and goals

Kimiko Shiratori (白鳥 公子, Shiratori Kimiko; born June 6, 1968) is a former Japanese football player. She played for Japan national team.

== National team career ==
Shiratori was born on June 6, 1968. In October 1984, when she was 16 years old, she was selected Japan national team for tour for China. On October 17, she debuted for Japan against Italy. She played 5 games for Japan until 1986.

== National team statistics ==
Japan national team
Year	Apps	Goals
1984	3	0
1985	0	0
1986	2	0
Total	5	0
