= 1989 AFC Women's Championship =

1989年亞足聯女子錦標賽

Tournament details
- Host country: Hong Kong
- Dates: 18–29 December
- Teams: 8 (from 1 confederation)
- Venue: 2 (in 1 host city)

Final positions
- Champions: China (2nd title)
- Runners-up: Chinese Taipei
- Third place: Japan
- Fourth place: Hong Kong

Tournament statistics
- Matches played: 16
- Goals scored: 80 (5 per match)

The Asian Football Confederation's 1989 AFC Women's Championship was held from 19 to 29 December 1989 in Hong Kong. The tournament was won by for the second consecutive time by China in the final against Chinese Taipei.

== Group stage ==
=== Group A ===
Team	Pld	W	D	L	GF	GA	GD	Pts
China	3	3	0	0	8	2	+6	6
Chinese Taipei	3	2	0	1	8	2	+6	4
North Korea	3	1	0	2	6	7	−1	2
Thailand	3	0	0	3	1	12	−11	0

Source: RSSSF
18 December 1989

China	1–0	Chinese Taipei
Wu Weiying 30'

Hong Kong Stadium, Hong Kong

21 December 1989

China	4–1	North Korea
Wu Weiying 19', 38'; Zhang Yan 35'; Liu Ailing 66'		Chu Jong-Ae 29'

Mong Kok Stadium, Hong Kong
21 December 1989

Chinese Taipei	5–0	Thailand

Mong Kok Stadium, Hong Kong

23 December 1989

China	3–1	Thailand
Wen Lirong 36'; Wu Weiying 62'; Zhang Yan 70'		Sunee Kridsanachandee 34'

Mong Kok Stadium, Hong Kong
23 December 1989

Chinese Taipei	3–1	North Korea
Shien Su-Jean 24', 55'; Chen Pau-Tsai 77'		Yang Mi-Gyong 30'

Mong Kok Stadium, Hong Kong

24 December 1989

North Korea	4–0	Thailand

Mong Kok Stadium, Hong Kong

=== Group B ===
Team	Pld	W	D	L	GF	GA	GD	Pts
Japan	3	3	0	0	28	0	+28	6
Hong Kong	3	1	1	1	3	3	0	3
Indonesia	3	1	1	1	8	11	−3	3
Nepal	3	0	0	3	0	25	−25	0

Source: RSSSF
18 December 1989

Hong Kong	3–0	Nepal
Cherry Tsui Sau-King 14', 67'; Ng Fung-Man 77'

Hong Kong Stadium, Hong Kong

19 December 1989

Japan	11–0	Indonesia
Nagamine 1', 16', 54', 59'; Tezuka 5', 79'; Etsuko Handa 11'; Takakura 18', 51', 71'; Kioka 33'

Mong Kok Stadium, Hong Kong

22 December 1989

Indonesia	8–0	Nepal

Mong Kok Stadium, Hong Kong
22 December 1989

Japan	3–0	Hong Kong
Nagamine 4'; Yamada 48'; Noda 70'

Mong Kok Stadium, Hong Kong

24 December 1989

Japan	14–0	Nepal
?' (o.g.); Handa ?', ?'; Nagamine ?', ?', ?', ?'; Ishibashi ?'; Kuroda ?'; Yamada ?'; Kioka ?', ?'; Hironaka ?', ?'

Mong Kok Stadium, Hong Kong
24 December 1989

Hong Kong	0–0	Indonesia

Mong Kok Stadium, Hong Kong

== Knock-out stage ==
Semi-finals
26 December
China	7
Hong Kong	0
26 December
Japan	0
Chinese Taipei	1

Final
29 December
China	1
Chinese Taipei	0
Third place
29 December
Japan	9
Hong Kong	0

=== Semi-final ===
26 December 1989

China	7–0	Hong Kong
Zhang Yan 8', 9', 19', 22', 53', 80'; Liu Ailing 43'

Mong Kok Stadium, Hong Kong
26 December 1989

Japan	0–1	Chinese Taipei
		Chou Tai-ying 10'

Mong Kok Stadium, Hong Kong

=== Third place match ===
29 December 1989

Japan	9–0	Hong Kong
Kioka 4 goals (3 pens); Handa 3 goals Watanabe; Matsuda

Hong Kong Stadium, Hong Kong

=== Final ===
29 December 1989

China	1–0	Chinese Taipei
Ma Li 23'

Hong Kong Stadium, Hong Kong

== Winner ==
AFC Women's Championship
1989 winners

China
Second title

== Goalscorers ==
There were 80 goals scored in 16 matches, for an average of 5 goals per match.

9 goals

- (Japan) Kaori Nagamine

7 goals

- (China) Zhang Yan
- (Japan) Futaba Kioka

6 goals

- (Japan) Etsuko Handa

4 goals

- (China) Wu Weiying

3 goals

- (Japan) Asako Takakura

2 goals

- (Hong Kong) Cherry Tsui Sau-King
- (Japan) Chiaki Yamada
- (Japan) Kazuko Hironaka
- (Japan) Takako Tezuka

1 goal

- (China) Liu Ailing
- (China) Ma Li
- (China) Sun Qingmei
- (China) Wen Lirong
- (Hong Kong) Ng Fung Man
- (Japan) Akemi Noda
- (Japan) Kyoko Kuroda
- (Japan) Michiko Matsuda
- (Japan) Noriko Ishibashi
- (Japan) Yumi Watanabe
- (Thailand) Sunee Kridsanachandee

1 own goal

- (Nepal) ? (against Japan)
