= Yumi Watanabe =

Japanese footballer

Yumi Watanabe 渡邊 由美
Personal information
- Full name: Yumi Watanabe
- Date of birth: July 2, 1970 (age 56)
- Place of birth: Japan
- Position: Defender

Senior career*
Years	Team	Apps	(Gls)
- Fujita Tendai SC Mercury

International career
1988–1991	Japan	19	(2)
Medal record
Representing Japan
AFC Women's Asian Cup
Bronze medal – third place	1989 Hong Kong
Asian Games
Silver medal – second place	1990 Beijing	Team
- * Club domestic league appearances and goals

Yumi Watanabe (渡邊 由美, Watanabe Yumi; born July 2, 1970) is a former Japanese football player. She played for Japan national team.

== Club career ==
Watanabe was born on July 2, 1970. She played for Fujita Tendai SC Mercury.

== National team career ==
On June 1, 1988, when Watanabe was 17 years old, she debuted for Japan national team against United States. She played at 1989 AFC Championship and 1990 Asian Games. She was also a member of Japan for 1991 World Cup. She played 19 games and scored 2 goals for Japan until 1991.

== National team statistics ==
Japan national team
Year	Apps	Goals
1988	2	0
1989	9	2
1990	6	0
1991	2	0
Total	19	2
