= Kazuko Hironaka =

Japanese footballer

Kazuko Hironaka 弘中 和子
Personal information
- Place of birth: Japan
- Position: Midfielder

Senior career*
Years	Team	Apps	(Gls)
- Nissan FC

International career
1984–1990	Japan	21	(3)
Medal record
Representing Japan
AFC Women's Asian Cup
Silver medal – second place	1986 China
Bronze medal – third place	1989 Hong Kong
Asian Games
Silver medal – second place	1990 Beijing	Team
- * Club domestic league appearances and goals

Kazuko Hironaka (弘中 和子, Hironaka Kazuko) is a Japanese former footballer who played as a midfielder. She played for Japan national team.

== Club career ==
Hironaka played for L.League club Nissan FC. She was selected Fighting Spirit prize in 1990 season.

== International career ==
In October 1984, Hironaka was selected by the Japan national team for a tour in China. On October 17, she debuted for Japan against Italy. She was a member of the national team in 1986 and in the 1989 AFC Championship. She also played in the 1990 Asian Games. That competition was her last game for Japan. She played 21 games and scored 3 goals for Japan between 1984 and 1990.

== Career statistics ==
Japan national team
Year	Apps	Goals
1984	3	0
1985	0	0
1986	10	0
1987	2	0
1988	0	0
1989	3	2
1990	3	1
Total	21	3
