= Yoko Takahagi =

Japanese footballer

Yoko Takahagi 高萩 陽子
Personal information
- Full name: Yoko Takahagi
- Date of birth: April 17, 1969 (age 57)
- Place of birth: Japan
- Position: Defender

Youth career
- Tokyo Gakugei University

Senior career*
Years	Team	Apps	(Gls)
- Shinko Seiko FC Clair

International career
1986–1991	Japan	31	(0)
Medal record
Representing Japan
AFC Women's Asian Cup
Silver medal – second place	1986 China
Silver medal – second place	1991 Japan
Bronze medal – third place	1989 Hong Kong
Asian Games
Silver medal – second place	1990 Beijing	Team
- * Club domestic league appearances and goals

Yoko Takahagi (高萩 陽子, Takahagi Yōko; born April 17, 1969) is a former Japanese football player. She played for Japan national team.

== Club career ==
Takahagi was born on April 17, 1969. She played for Shinko Seiko FC Clair.

== National team career ==
On January 21, 1986, when Takahagi was 16 years old, she debuted for Japan national team against India. She played at 1986, 1989 and 1991 AFC Championship. She also played at 1990 Asian Games. She was a member of Japan for 1991 World Cup. She played 31 games for Japan until 1991.

== National team statistics ==
Japan national team
Year	Apps	Goals
1986	13	0
1987	2	0
1988	0	0
1989	6	0
1990	6	0
1991	4	0
Total	31	0
