= Chiaki Yamada =

Japanese footballer

Chiaki Yamada 山田 千愛
Personal information
- Full name: Chiaki Yamada
- Date of birth: August 2, 1966 (age 60)
- Place of birth: Shizuoka, Shizuoka, Japan
- Position: Midfielder

Senior career*
| Years | Team | Apps | (Gls) |
| 1980-88 | Shimizudaihachi SC | | |
| 1989 | Suzuyo Shimizu FC Lovely Ladies | | |

International career
| 1984–1989 | Japan | 21 | (3) |
Medal record
Representing Japan
AFC Women's Asian Cup
| Bronze medal – third place | 1989 Hong Kong |
- * Club domestic league appearances and goals

Chiaki Yamada (山田 千愛, Yamada Chiaki; born August 2, 1966) is a former Japanese football player. She played for the Japan national team.

== Club career ==
Yamada was born in Shizuoka on August 2, 1966. She played for her local club Shimizudaihachi SC in the Shizuoka League where teams she belonged to won the championship in seven consecutive years from1980-1986, and for the Suzuyo Shimizu FC Lovely Ladies, in the Japan Women’s Football League where she belonged to the team which won the inaugural title in 1989.

The Suzuyo Shimizu FC Lovely Ladies team was a new team created specifically for the new competition mostly using the best players from the previous dominant Shimizudaihachi SC team, which was unable to afford to participate in the new completion. As one of the key players in Shimizuhachidai, Yamada was chosen for the new team.

== National team career ==
On October 17, 1984, when Yamada was 18 years old, she debuted for the Japan national team against Italy. She was a member of the Japan team for the 1989 AFC Championship. She played her last game for Japan in this competition. In total, Yamada played 21 games, and scored 3 goals, for Japan between 1984 and 1989.

== National team statistics ==
Japan national team
| Year | Apps | Goals |
|---|---|---|
| 1984 | 2 | 0 |
| 1985 | 0 | 0 |
| 1986 | 6 | 0 |
| 1987 | 4 | 1 |
| 1988 | 2 | 0 |
| 1989 | 7 | 2 |
| Total | 21 | 3 |
