= Akihiro Nishimura (footballer) =

Japanese footballer and manager

Akihiro Nishimura 西村 昭宏
Personal information
- Full name: Akihiro Nishimura
- Date of birth: August 8, 1958 (age 68)
- Place of birth: Osaka, Japan
- Height: 1.75 m (5 ft 9 in)
- Position: Midfielder

Youth career
- 1974–1976: Hokuyo High School

College career
Years	Team	Apps	(Gls)
1977–1980	Osaka University H&SS		

Senior career*
Years	Team	Apps	(Gls)
1981–1991	Yammer Diesel	148	(3)
Total		148	(3)

International career
1980–1988	Japan	49	(2)

Managerial career
- 1999–2001: Japan U-20
- 2001–2003: Cerezo Osaka
- 2004: Kyoto Purple Sanga
- 2014–2016: Kochi United SC
Medal record
Yanmar Diesel
Winner	JSL Cup	1983
Winner	JSL Cup	1984
Runner-up	JSL Cup	1982
Runner-up	Emperor's Cup	1983
- * Club domestic league appearances and goals

Akihiro Nishimura (西村 昭宏, Nishimura Akihiro; born August 8, 1958) is a former Japanese football player and manager. He played for Japan national team.

== Club career ==
Nishimura was born in Osaka Prefecture on August 8, 1958. After graduating from Osaka University of Health and Sport Sciences, he joined his local club Yammer Diesel in 1981. The club won 1983 and 1984 JSL Cup. He retired in 1991. He played 148 games and scored 3 goals in the league. He was selected Best Eleven in 1982.

== National team career ==
On June 18, 1980, when Nishimura was an Osaka University of Health and Sport Sciences student, he debuted for Japan national team against Hong Kong. He played at 1984 Summer Olympics qualification, 1986 World Cup qualification, 1982 Asian Games and 1988 Summer Olympics qualification. He played 49 games and scored 2 goals for Japan until 1988.

== Coaching career ==
After retirement, Nishimura started coaching career at Matsushita Electric (later Gamba Osaka) in 1991. In 1999, he became a manager for Japan U-20 national team. He managed U-20 Japan at the 2001 World Youth Championship in Argentina. In September 2001, he signed with Cerezo Osaka and became coach. In December, he became a manager as João Carlos successor and he led the club to won the 2nd place in Emperor's Cup. In October 2003, he was sacked. In 2004, he signed with Kyoto Purple Sanga. He was sacked in June.

== Club statistics ==
Club performance			League		Cup		League Cup		Total	
Season	Club	League	Apps	Goals	Apps	Goals	Apps	Goals	Apps	Goals
Japan			League		Emperor's Cup		JSL Cup		Total	
1981	Yanmar Diesel	JSL Division 1	18	0					18	0
1982	Yanmar Diesel	JSL Division 1	14	1					14	1
1983	Yanmar Diesel	JSL Division 1	12	0					12	0
1984	Yanmar Diesel	JSL Division 1	17	0					17	0
1985/86	Yanmar Diesel	JSL Division 1	21	1					21	1
1986/87	Yanmar Diesel	JSL Division 1	21	0					21	0
1987/88	Yanmar Diesel	JSL Division 1	5	0					5	0
1988/89	Yanmar Diesel	JSL Division 1	10	0					10	0
1989/90	Yanmar Diesel	JSL Division 1	15	1			0	0	15	1
1990/91	Yanmar Diesel	JSL Division 1	15	0			2	0	17	0
Total			148	3	0	0	2	0	150	3

== National team statistics ==
Japan national team
Year	Apps	Goals
1980	1	0
1981	13	0
1982	2	0
1983	10	0
1984	1	0
1985	8	2
1986	5	0
1987	8	0
1988	1	0
Total	49	2

== Managerial statistics ==
Team	From	To	Record				
Team	From	To	G	W	D	L	Win %
Cerezo Osaka	2001	2003	71	37	15	19	52.11
Kyoto Purple Sanga	2004	2004	17	5	7	5	29.41
Total			88	42	22	24	47.73
