= Mayumi Kaji =

Japanese footballer

Mayumi Kaji 加治 真弓
Personal information
- Full name: Mayumi Kaji
- Date of birth: 28 June 1964 (age 62)
- Place of birth: Japan
- Position: Defender

Senior career*
Years	Team	Apps	(Gls)
- Tasaki Kobe

International career
1981–1991	Japan	48	(0)
Medal record
Representing Japan
AFC Women's Asian Cup
Silver medal – second place	1986 China
Silver medal – second place	1991 Japan
Bronze medal – third place	1989 Hong Kong
Asian Games
Silver medal – second place	1990 Beijing	Team
- * Club domestic league appearances and goals

Mayumi Kaji (加治 真弓, Kaji Mayumi; born 28 June 1964) is a former Japanese football player. She played for Japan national team.

== Club career ==
Kaji was born on 28 June 1964. She played for Tasaki Kobe. In 1989, she was selected Best Eleven L.League first season.

== National team career ==
On 6 September 1981, when Kaji was 17 years old, she debuted for Japan national team against England. She played at 1986, 1989, 1991 AFC Championship and 1990 Asian Games. She was also a member of Japan for 1991 World Cup. This competition was her last game for Japan. She played 48 games for Japan until 1991.

== National team statistics ==
Japan national team
Year	Apps	Goals
1981	1	0
1982	0	0
1983	0	0
1984	0	0
1985	0	0
1986	12	0
1987	4	0
1988	3	0
1989	9	0
1990	7	0
1991	12	0
Total	48	0
