= Takako Tezuka =

Japanese footballer and manager

Takako Tezuka 手塚 貴子
Personal information
- Full name: Takako Tezuka
- Date of birth: 6 November 1970 (age 56)
- Place of birth: Utsunomiya, Tochigi, Japan
- Position: Forward

Senior career*
Years	Team	Apps	(Gls)
????–1992	Yomiuri Nippon Beleza		
1996–1999	NTV Beleza	59	(21)

International career
1986–1991	Japan	41	(19)

Managerial career
- 2013: Urawa Reds
Medal record
NTV Beleza
Winner	Nadeshiko League	1990
Winner	Nadeshiko League	1991
Winner	Nadeshiko League	1992
Runner-up	Nadeshiko League	1989
Runner-up	Nadeshiko League	1997
Runner-up	Nadeshiko League	1998
Runner-up	Nadeshiko League	1999
Winner	Nadeshiko League Cup	1996
Winner	Nadeshiko League Cup	1999
Runner-up	Nadeshiko League Cup	1997
Winner	Empress's Cup	1997
Runner-up	Empress's Cup	1991
Runner-up	Empress's Cup	1992
Runner-up	Empress's Cup	1996
Representing Japan
AFC Women's Asian Cup
Silver medal – second place	1986 China
Silver medal – second place	1991 Japan
Bronze medal – third place	1989 Hong Kong
Asian Games
Silver medal – second place	1990 Beijing	Team
- * Club domestic league appearances and goals

Takako Tezuka (手塚 貴子, Tezuka Takako; born 6 November 1970) is a former Japanese football player and manager. She played for Japan national team.

== Club career ==
Tezuka was born in Utsunomiya on 6 November 1970. She played for Yomiuri Nippon Beleza (later NTV Beleza). The club won L.League for 3 years in a row (1990-1992). In 1991 season, she became top scorer with 29 goals and she was selected MVP awards. She was also selected Best Eleven for 4 years in a row (1989-1992). End of 1992 season, she retired. However, during 1996 season, she came back and played for NTV Beleza until 1999.

== National team career ==
On 7 March 1986, when Tezuka was 15 years old, she debuted for Japan national team against Chinese Taipei. She played at 1986, 1989, 1991 AFC Championship and 1990 Asian Games. She was also a member of Japan for 1991 World Cup. This competition was her last game for Japan. She played 41 games and scored 19 goals for Japan until 1991.

== Coaching career ==
After retirement, Tezuka started coaching career in her local Tochigi Prefecture. In 2011, she became assistant coach for Japan U-20 and U-17 national team. In October, U-20 team won 2011 AFC U-19 Championship and in November, U-17 team won 2011 AFC U-16 Championship. She has been given the AFC Women's Coach Of The Year Award. In 2013, she was appointed manager for Urawa Reds. However, in June, she resigned for health reasons.

== National team statistics ==
Japan national team
Year	Apps	Goals
1986	10	1
1987	4	0
1988	3	1
1989	9	6
1990	4	6
1991	11	5
Total	41	19
