= Futaba Kioka =

Japanese footballer

Futaba Kioka 木岡 二葉
Personal information
- Full name: Futaba Kioka
- Date of birth: 22 November 1965 (age 60)
- Place of birth: Shizuoka, Japan
- Height: 1.62 m (5 ft 4 in)
- Position: Midfielder

Senior career*
Years	Team	Apps	(Gls)
1978–1988	Shimizudaihachi SC		
1989–1996	Suzuyo Shimizu FC Lovely Ladies		

International career
1981–1996	Japan	75	(30)
Medal record
Shimizudaihachi SC
Winner	Empress's Cup	1980
Winner	Empress's Cup	1981
Winner	Empress's Cup	1982
Winner	Empress's Cup	1983
Winner	Empress's Cup	1984
Winner	Empress's Cup	1985
Winner	Empress's Cup	1986
Runner-up	Empress's Cup	1979
Runner-up	Empress's Cup	1987
Suzuyo Shimizu FC Lovely Ladies
Winner	Nadeshiko League	1989
Runner-up	Nadeshiko League	1990
Runner-up	Nadeshiko League	1991
Runner-up	Nadeshiko League	1992
Runner-up	Nadeshiko League	1993
Winner	Empress's Cup	1991
Runner-up	Empress's Cup	1989
Runner-up	Empress's Cup	1990
Representing Japan
AFC Women's Asian Cup
Silver medal – second place	1986 China
Silver medal – second place	1995 Malaysia
Bronze medal – third place	1989 Hong Kong
Bronze medal – third place	1993 Malaysia
Asian Games
Silver medal – second place	1990 Beijing	Team
Silver medal – second place	1994 Hiroshima	Team
- * Club domestic league appearances and goals

Futaba Kioka (木岡 二葉, Kioka Futaba; born 22 November 1965) is a former Japanese football player. She played for Japan national team.

== Club career ==
Kioka was born in Shizuoka Prefecture on 22 November 1965. She played for her local club Shimizudaihachi SC until 1988. In 1989, she moved to Shimizu FC Ladies (later Suzuyo Shimizu FC Lovely Ladies). In 1989, the club won championship in L.League first season and from next season, won 2nd place for 4 years in a row until 1993 season. She was selected Best Eleven 3 times (1989, 1990 and 1995).

== National team career ==
In June 1981, when Kioka was 16 years old, she was selected Japan national team for 1981 AFC Championship. At this competition, on 7 June, she debuted against Chinese Taipei. This match is Japan team first match in International A Match. She also played at 1986, 1989, 1993, 1995 AFC Championship, 1990, 1994 Asian Games. She was a member of Japan for 1991, 1995 World Cup and 1996 Summer Olympics. She played 75 games and scored 30 goals for Japan until 1996.

== National team statistics ==
Japan national team
Year	Apps	Goals
1981	5	0
1982	0	0
1983	0	0
1984	3	1
1985	0	0
1986	13	7
1987	4	1
1988	3	0
1989	10	9
1990	7	7
1991	6	1
1992	0	0
1993	5	2
1994	5	1
1995	9	0
1996	5	1
Total	75	30
