= Masae Suzuki =

Japanese footballer and manager

Masae Suzuki 鈴木 政江
Personal information
- Full name: Masae Suzuki
- Date of birth: January 21, 1957 (age 69)
- Place of birth: Chiba, Chiba, Japan
- Position: Goalkeeper

Senior career*
Years	Team	Apps	(Gls)
1977–1984	Mitsubishi Heavy Industries		
1985–1989	Nissan FC	9	(0)
1990–1991	Nikko Securities Dream Ladies	11+	(0)
2002–2004	JEF United Ichihara	9	(0)
Total		29+	(0)

International career
1984–1991	Japan	45	(0)

Managerial career
- 2000–2004: JEF United Ichihara
Medal record
Nikko Securities Dream Ladies
Winner	Empress's Cup	1990
Representing Japan
AFC Women's Asian Cup
Silver medal – second place	1986 China
Silver medal – second place	1991 Japan
Bronze medal – third place	1989 Hong Kong
Asian Games
Silver medal – second place	1990 Beijing	Team
- * Club domestic league appearances and goals

Masae Suzuki (鈴木 政江, Suzuki Masae; born January 21, 1957) is a former Japanese football player and manager. She played for Japan national team.

== Club career ==
Suzuki was born in Chiba on January 21, 1957. She started playing career at Mitsubishi Heavy Industries. In 1985, she moved to FC Jinnan (later Nissan FC). In 1990, she moved to her local new club, Nikko Securities Dream Ladies. End of 1991 season, she retired. During 2002 season, she came back as playing manager at JEF United Ichihara. In 2004 season, she played 9 games in L.League. She made the records for the oldest player in L.League match at the age of 47 years.

== National team career ==
On October 24, 1984, when Suzuki was 27 years old, she debuted for Japan national team against Italy. She played at 1986, 1989, 1991 AFC Championship and 1990 Asian Games. She was also a member of Japan for 1991 World Cup. This competition was her last game for Japan. She played 45 games for Japan until 1991.

== Coaching career ==
After retirement, in 2000, Suzuki became manager for JEF United Ichihara. End of 2004 season, she was succeeded by Takashi Uemura and she became assistant coach until 2017 season.

== National team statistics ==
Japan national team
Year	Apps	Goals
1984	1	0
1985	0	0
1986	13	0
1987	4	0
1988	3	0
1989	9	0
1990	5	0
1991	10	0
Total	45	0
