= Kaori Nagamine =

Japanese footballer

Kaori Nagamine 長峯 かおり
Personal information
- Full name: Kaori Nagamine
- Date of birth: 3 June 1968 (age 58)
- Place of birth: Kodaira, Tokyo, Japan
- Height: 1.60 m (5 ft 3 in)
- Position: Forward

Senior career*
Years	Team	Apps	(Gls)
1981–1990	Shinko Seiko FC Clair	28	(3)
1991–1993	Reggiana Refrattari Zambelli		
1993–1999	Suzuyo Shimizu FC Lovely Ladies		

International career
1984–1996	Japan	64	(48)
Medal record
Suzuyo Shimizu FC Lovely Ladies
Runner-up	Nadeshiko League	1993
Representing Japan
AFC Women's Asian Cup
Silver medal – second place	1986 China
Silver medal – second place	1991 Japan
Silver medal – second place	1995 Malaysia
Bronze medal – third place	1989 Hong Kong
Bronze medal – third place	1993 Malaysia
Asian Games
Silver medal – second place	1990 Beijing	Team
Silver medal – second place	1994 Hiroshima	Team
- * Club domestic league appearances and goals

Kaori Nagamine (長峯 かおり, Nagamine Kaori; born 3 June 1968) is a former Japanese football player. She played for Japan national team.

== Club career ==
Nagamine was born in Kodaira on 3 June 1968. She played for Shinko Seiko FC Clair until 1990. She was selected Best Eleven in 1990 season. In 1991, she moved to Italian club Reggiana Refrattari Zambelli. She then became the first Asian footballer to play in Serie A. The club won Serie A for 2 years in a row. However, Reggiana was relegated due to financial strain. In 1993, she returned to Japan and joined Suzuyo Shimizu FC Lovely Ladies. However, the club was withdrew from L.League end of 1998 season. The club was disbanded end of 1999. So, she retired.

== National team career ==
On 22 October 1984, when Nagamine was 16 years old, she debuted for Japan national team against Australia. She was a member of Japan for 1991 and 1995 World Cup. She also played at 1986, 1989, 1991, 1993, 1995 AFC Championship, 1990 and 1994 Asian Games. She played 64 games and scored 48 goals for Japan until 1996.

== National team statistics ==
Japan national team
Year	Apps	Goals
1984	1	0
1985	0	0
1986	13	12
1987	4	1
1988	3	1
1989	10	13
1990	6	7
1991	12	5
1992	0	0
1993	4	5
1994	5	2
1995	5	2
1996	1	0
Total	64	48

List of international goals scored by Kaori Nagamine
No.	Date	Venue	Opponent	Score	Result	Competition
1.	26 January 1986	Jakarta, Indonesia	India	2–0	7–0	Friendly
2.	26 January 1986	Jakarta, Indonesia	India	4–0	7–0	Friendly
3.	26 January 1986	Jakarta, Indonesia	India	7–0	7–0	Friendly
4.	21 July 1986	Jesolo, Italy	Mexico	?–0	3–0	1986 Mundialito
5.	21 July 1986	Jesolo, Italy	Mexico	?–0	3–0	1986 Mundialito
6.	23 September 1986	Tokyo, Japan	Italy	?–?	2–3	Friendly
7.	23 September 1986	Tokyo, Japan	Italy	?–?	2–3	Friendly
8.	18 December 1986	Hong Kong	Malaysia	3–0	10–0	1986 AFC Women's Championship
9.	18 December 1986	Hong Kong	Malaysia	4–0	10–0	1986 AFC Women's Championship
10.	18 December 1986	Hong Kong	Malaysia	5–0	10–0	1986 AFC Women's Championship
11.	18 December 1986	Hong Kong	Malaysia	6–0	10–0	1986 AFC Women's Championship
12.	21 December 1986	Hong Kong	Thailand	2–0	4–0	1986 AFC Women's Championship
13.	15 December 1987	Taiwan	Hong Kong	?–0	5–0	1987 Chunghua Cup
14.	1 June 1988	Panyu, China	United States	?–?	2–5	1988 FIFA Women's Invitation Tournament
15.	14 January 1989	Xiamen, China	Philippines	?–0	13–0	Friendly
16.	14 January 1989	Xiamen, China	Philippines	?–0	13–0	Friendly
17.	2 December 1989	Kanagawa, Japan	Australia	1–?	2–2	Friendly
18.	2 December 1989	Kanagawa, Japan	Australia	2–?	2–2	Friendly
19.	19 December 1989	Hong Kong	Indonesia	1–0	11–0	1989 AFC Women's Championship
20.	19 December 1989	Hong Kong	Indonesia	4–0	11–0	1989 AFC Women's Championship
21.	19 December 1989	Hong Kong	Indonesia	8–0	11–0	1989 AFC Women's Championship
22.	19 December 1989	Hong Kong	Indonesia	9–0	11–0	1989 AFC Women's Championship
23.	22 December 1989	Hong Kong	Hong Kong	1–0	3–0	1989 AFC Women's Championship
24.	24 December 1989	Hong Kong	Nepal	?–0	14–0	1989 AFC Women's Championship
25.	24 December 1989	Hong Kong	Nepal	?–0	14–0	1989 AFC Women's Championship
26.	24 December 1989	Hong Kong	Nepal	?–0	14–0	1989 AFC Women's Championship
27.	24 December 1989	Hong Kong	Nepal	?–0	14–0	1989 AFC Women's Championship
28.	6 September 1990	Seoul, South Korea	South Korea	4–0	13–1	Friendly
29.	6 September 1990	Seoul, South Korea	South Korea	?–?	13–1	Friendly
30.	6 September 1990	Seoul, South Korea	South Korea	13–1	13–1	Friendly
31.	29 September 1990	Beijing, China	South Korea	3–0	8–1	1990 Asian Games
32.	29 September 1990	Beijing, China	South Korea	4–0	8–1	1990 Asian Games
33.	1 October 1990	Beijing, China	Hong Kong	?–0	5–0	1990 Asian Games
34.	3 October 1990	Beijing, China	Chinese Taipei	?–?	3–1	1990 Asian Games
35.	26 May 1991	Fukuoka, Japan	North Korea	1–0	1–0	1991 AFC Women's Championship
36.	28 May 1991	Fukuoka, Japan	Hong Kong	?–?	4–1	1991 AFC Women's Championship
37.	1 June 1991	Fukuoka, Japan	Malaysia	?–0	12–0	1991 AFC Women's Championship
38.	1 June 1991	Fukuoka, Japan	Malaysia	?–0	12–0	1991 AFC Women's Championship
39.	1 June 1991	Fukuoka, Japan	Malaysia	?–0	12–0	1991 AFC Women's Championship
40.	4 December 1993	Kuching, Malaysia	Chinese Taipei	?–?	6–1	1993 AFC Women's Championship
41.	6 December 1993	Kuching, Malaysia	Philippines	?–0	15–0	1993 AFC Women's Championship
42.	6 December 1993	Kuching, Malaysia	Philippines	?–0	15–0	1993 AFC Women's Championship
43.	6 December 1993	Kuching, Malaysia	Philippines	?–0	15–0	1993 AFC Women's Championship
44.	6 December 1993	Kuching, Malaysia	Philippines	?–0	15–0	1993 AFC Women's Championship
45.	4 October 1994	Fukuyama, Japan	South Korea	?–0	5–0	1994 Asian Games
46.	4 October 1994	Fukuyama, Japan	South Korea	?–0	5–0	1994 Asian Games
47.	25 September 1995	Kota Kinabalu, Malaysia	India	?–0	6–0	1995 AFC Women's Championship
48.	25 September 1995	Kota Kinabalu, Malaysia	India	?–0	6–0	1995 AFC Women's Championship
