= Akemi Noda =

Japanese footballer and manager

Akemi Noda 野田 朱美
Personal information
- Full name: Akemi Noda
- Date of birth: October 13, 1969 (age 57)
- Place of birth: Komae, Tokyo, Japan
- Height: 1.66 m (5 ft 5 in)
- Position: Midfielder

Senior career*
| Years | Team | Apps | (Gls) |
| 1982–1994 | Yomiuri-Seiyu Beleza | 92 | (69) |
| 1995–1996 | Takarazuka Bunnys | 35 | (6) |
| Total | | 127 | (75) |

International career
| 1984–1996 | Japan | 76 | (24) |

Managerial career
- 2011–2012: Nippon TV Beleza
- 2016–2017: Iga FC Kunoichi
Medal record
Yomiuri-Seiyu Beleza
| Winner | Nadeshiko League | 1990 |
| Winner | Nadeshiko League | 1991 |
| Winner | Nadeshiko League | 1992 |
| Winner | Nadeshiko League | 1993 |
| Runner-up | Nadeshiko League | 1989 |
| Runner-up | Nadeshiko League | 1994 |
| Winner | Empress's Cup | 1987 |
| Winner | Empress's Cup | 1988 |
| Winner | Empress's Cup | 1993 |
| Runner-up | Empress's Cup | 1986 |
| Runner-up | Empress's Cup | 1991 |
| Runner-up | Empress's Cup | 1992 |
Representing Japan
AFC Women's Asian Cup
| Silver medal – second place | 1986 China |
| Silver medal – second place | 1991 Japan |
| Silver medal – second place | 1995 Malaysia |
| Bronze medal – third place | 1989 Hong Kong |
| Bronze medal – third place | 1993 Malaysia |
Asian Games
| Silver medal – second place | 1990 Beijing | Team |
| Silver medal – second place | 1994 Hiroshima | Team |
- * Club domestic league appearances and goals

Akemi Noda (野田 朱美, Noda Akemi; born October 13, 1969) is a former Japanese football player and manager. She played for Japan national team.

== Playing career ==
Noda was born in Komae on October 13, 1969. In 1982, she joined Yomiuri Beleza. The club won L.League for 4 years in a row (1990-1993). In 1990 season, she became top scorer with 16 goals and she was selected MVP awards. She was also selected Best Eleven 5 times (1989, 1990, 1991, 1993 and 1994). In 1995, she moved to Takarazuka Bunnys. In 1996, she retired.

== National team career ==
On October 17, 1984, when Noda was 15 years old, she debuted for Japan national team against Italy. She played at 1986, 1989, 1991, 1993, 1995 AFC Championship, 1990 and 1994 Asian Games. She was also a member of Japan for 1991, 1995 World Cup and 1996 Summer Olympics. She played 76 games and scored 24 goals for Japan until 1996.

== Coaching career ==
Following the end of the 2010 L.League Noda was appointed Nippon TV Beleza's manager. She resigned in 2012. In May 2016, she was appointed Iga FC Kunoichi. She managed until end of 2017 season.

== National team statistics ==
Japan national team
| Year | Apps | Goals |
|---|---|---|
| 1984 | 1 | 0 |
| 1985 | 0 | 0 |
| 1986 | 12 | 2 |
| 1987 | 4 | 0 |
| 1988 | 3 | 0 |
| 1989 | 7 | 1 |
| 1990 | 7 | 2 |
| 1991 | 13 | 7 |
| 1992 | 0 | 0 |
| 1993 | 4 | 0 |
| 1994 | 6 | 3 |
| 1995 | 9 | 8 |
| 1996 | 10 | 1 |
| Total | 76 | 24 |

== International goals ==
| No. | Date | Venue | Opponent | Score | Result | Competition |
|---|---|---|---|---|---|---|
| 1. | 26 January 1986 | Jakarta, Indonesia | India | 1–0 | 7–0 | Friendly |
| 2. | 21 December 1986 | Kowloon, Hong Kong | Thailand | 3–0 | 4–0 | 1986 AFC Women's Championship |
| 3. | 22 December 1989 | Kowloon, Hong Kong | Hong Kong | 3–0 | 3–0 | 1989 AFC Women's Championship |
| 4. | 29 September 1990 | Beijing, China | South Korea | 6–1 | 8–1 | 1990 Asian Games |
| 5. | 7 June 1995 | Karlstad, Sweden | Brazil | 1–1 | 2–1 | 1995 FIFA Women's World Cup |
| 6. | 7 June 1995 | Karlstad, Sweden | Brazil | 2–1 | 2–1 | 1995 FIFA Women's World Cup |
| 24. | 21 July 1996 | Birmingham, United States | Germany | 2–2 | 2–3 | 1996 Summer Olympics |
