= Etsuko Handa =

Japanese association football player

Etsuko Handa 半田 悦子
Personal information
- Full name: Etsuko Handa
- Date of birth: 10 May 1965 (age 61)
- Place of birth: Shizuoka, Shizuoka, Japan
- Height: 1.60 m (5 ft 3 in)
- Position: Midfielder

Senior career*
Years	Team	Apps	(Gls)
- Shimizudaihachi SC
1989–1996	Suzuyo Shimizu FC Lovely Ladies	131	(71)
Total		131	(71)

International career
1981–1996	Japan	75	(19)
Medal record
Suzuyo Shimizu FC Lovely Ladies
Winner	Nadeshiko League	1989
Runner-up	Nadeshiko League	1990
Runner-up	Nadeshiko League	1991
Runner-up	Nadeshiko League	1992
Runner-up	Nadeshiko League	1993
Winner	Empress's Cup	1991
Runner-up	Empress's Cup	1989
Runner-up	Empress's Cup	1990
Representing Japan
AFC Women's Asian Cup
Silver medal – second place	1986 China
Silver medal – second place	1991 Japan
Silver medal – second place	1995 Malaysia
Bronze medal – third place	1989 Hong Kong
Bronze medal – third place	1993 Malaysia
Asian Games
Silver medal – second place	1990 Beijing	Team
Silver medal – second place	1994 Hiroshima	Team
- * Club domestic league appearances and goals

Etsuko Handa (半田 悦子, Handa Etsuko; born 10 May 1965) is a Japanese former professional footballer. She was also a member of the Japan national team.

== Club career ==
Handa was born in Shizuoka on 10 May 1965. She played for her local club Shimizudaihachi SC and Suzuyo Shimizu FC Lovely Ladies (formerly Shimizu FC Ladies). In 1989, Handa helped Shimizu FC Ladies win the L.League in its inaugural season, while also earning the Best player award. During the 1993 season, she scored 14 goals and was the league's top scorer. She was selected Best Eleven four times (1989, 1990, 1993, 1994).

== National team career ==
In June 1981, when Handa was 16 years old, she was selected to the Japan national team for the 1981 AFC Championship. At this competition, she debuted against Chinese Taipei on 7 June. This fixture was also Japan's first International A Match. On 13 June, she scored a goal in Japan's (1–0) victory against Indonesia. It was Japan's first goal and first win in an "A" match. She also played at the 1986, 1989, 1991, 1993 and 1995 AFC Championships. Handa also competed at the 1990 and 1994 Asian Games, as well as the 1991 and 1995 World Cups and the 1996 Summer Olympics. She played 75 games in total for Japan throughout her career, as well as scoring 19 goals.

== National team statistics ==
Japan national team
Year	Apps	Goals
1981	5	1
1982	0	0
1983	0	0
1984	3	0
1985	0	0
1986	13	2
1987	4	0
1988	3	1
1989	9	6
1990	6	4
1991	8	2
1992	0	0
1993	5	3
1994	5	0
1995	7	0
1996	7	0
Total	75	19
