= Michiko Matsuda =

Japanese footballer

Michiko Matsuda 松田 理子
Personal information
- Full name: Michiko Matsuda
- Date of birth: 26 October 1966 (age 60)
- Place of birth: Japan
- Position: Midfielder

Senior career*
Years	Team	Apps	(Gls)
- Prima Ham FC Kunoichi

International career
1981–1991	Japan	45	(10)
Medal record
Representing Japan
AFC Women's Asian Cup
Silver medal – second place	1986 China
Silver medal – second place	1991 Japan
Bronze medal – third place	1989 Hong Kong
Asian Games
Silver medal – second place	1990 Beijing	Team
- * Club domestic league appearances and goals

Michiko Matsuda (松田 理子, Matsuda Michiko; born 26 October 1966) is a former Japanese football player. She played for Japan national team.

== Club career ==
Matsuda was born on 26 October 1966. She played for Prima Ham FC Kunoichi.

== National team career ==
On 6 September 1981, when Matsuda was 15 years old, she debuted for Japan national team against England. She played at 1986, 1989, 1991 AFC Championship and 1990 Asian Games. She was also a member of Japan for 1991 World Cup. This competition was her last game for Japan. She played 45 games and scored 10 goals for Japan until 1991.

== National team statistics ==
Japan national team
Year	Apps	Goals
1981	1	0
1982	0	0
1983	0	0
1984	3	2
1985	0	0
1986	10	3
1987	4	0
1988	2	0
1989	9	1
1990	5	2
1991	11	2
Total	45	10
