= 1981 AFC Women's Championship =

Tournament details
- Host country: Hong Kong
- Dates: 7–17 June
- Teams: 8 (from 1 confederation)
- Venue: 2 (in 1 host city)

Final positions
- Champions: Mulan Taipei (3rd title)
- Runners-up: Thailand
- Third place: India
- Fourth place: Hong Kong

Tournament statistics
- Matches played: 16
- Goals scored: 50 (3.13 per match)

The Asian Football Confederation's 1981 AFC Women's Championship was the fourth AFC Women's Championship. It was held from 7 to 17 June 1981 in Hong Kong. The tournament was won by for the third consecutive time by Chinese Taipei in the final against Thailand.

== Stadiums ==
- Government Stadium
- Mong Kok Stadium

== Group stage ==
=== Group A ===
Team	Pld	W	D	L	GF	GA	GD	Pts
India	3	2	1	0	13	0	+13	5
Hong Kong	3	2	1	0	3	0	+3	5
Singapore	3	1	0	2	4	7	−3	2
Philippines	3	0	0	3	1	14	−13	0

Source: RSSSF
7 June 1981

Hong Kong	2−0	Philippines
Wong Mei-Yee 3'; Tao Kwai-Mui 17'

Government Stadium, Hong Kong
Attendance: 8,123

8 June 1981

India	5−0	Singapore
Mullick 4x'; Shukla Dutta

Mong Kok Stadium, Hong Kong
Attendance: 3,427

10 June 1981

Hong Kong	1−0	Singapore
Cheung Suet-Ping 13'

Mong Kok Stadium, Hong Kong
10 June 1981

India	8−0	Philippines
Shukia Nag 4x'; Mullick 2x'; Socorina Pereira; Ghosh

Mong Kok Stadium, Hong Kong

12 June 1981

Hong Kong	0−0	India

Mong Kok Stadium, Hong Kong
Attendance: 1,200
12 June 1981

Singapore	4−1	Philippines

Mong Kok Stadium, Hong Kong
Attendance: 1,200

=== Group B ===
Team	Pld	W	D	L	GF	GA	GD	Pts
Mulan Taipei	3	3	0	0	14	0	+14	6
Thailand	3	2	0	1	5	3	+2	4
Japan	3	1	0	2	1	3	−2	2
Indonesia	3	0	0	3	0	14	−14	0

Source: RSSSF
7 June 1981

Mulan Taipei	1−0	Japan
Liu Yu-chu 39'

Government Stadium, Hong Kong
Attendance: 8,123

8 June 1981

Thailand	3−0	Indonesia
Busara Rungsawai; Chanchana Photongnak; Wanvila Tongsa

Mong Kok Stadium, Hong Kong
Attendance: 3,427

11 June 1981

Mulan Taipei	10−0	Indonesia
Chou Tai-ying 5x'; Ho Su-ching 2x'; Huang Bee-yueh; Chao Feng-ying; Dorce Upuya 15' (o.g.)

Mong Kok Stadium, Hong Kong
Attendance: 6,822
11 June 1981

Thailand	2−0	Japan
Panadda Chipeankha; Wannipha Yeepracha

Mong Kok Stadium, Hong Kong
Attendance: 6,822

13 June 1981

Mulan Taipei	3−0	Thailand

Mong Kok Stadium, Hong Kong
Attendance: 7,300
13 June 1981

Japan	1−0	Indonesia
Handa

Mong Kok Stadium, Hong Kong
Attendance: 7,300

== Knock-out stage ==
Semi-finals
15 June
Thailand	1
India	0
15 June
Hong Kong	0
Mulan Taipei	1

Final
17 June
Thailand	0
Mulan Taipei	5
Third place
17 June
Hong Kong	0
India	2

=== Semi-final ===
15 June 1981

Thailand	1–0	India
Budsara Rungsawai 50'

Government Stadium, Hong Kong
Attendance: 9,956
15 June 1981

Hong Kong	0–1	Mulan Taipei
		Chou Tai-ying 37'

Government Stadium, Hong Kong
Attendance: 9,956

=== Third place match ===
17 June 1981

Hong Kong	0–2	India
		Shukla Dutta 25'; Socorina Pereira 51'

Government Stadium, Hong Kong
Attendance: 16,969

=== Final ===
17 June 1981

Thailand	0–5	Mulan Taipei
		Chao Feng-ying 1', 20'; Chen Hsiu-jung 5'; Chou Tai-ying 11', 50'

Government Stadium, Hong Kong
Attendance: 16,969

== Winner ==
AFC Women's Championship
1981 winners

Mulan Taipei
Third title
