= Nao Shikata =

Japanese footballer

Nao Shikata 四方 菜穂
Personal information
- Full name: Nao Shikata
- Date of birth: November 5, 1979 (age 46)
- Place of birth: Kamakura, Kanagawa, Japan
- Height: 1.65 m (5 ft 5 in)
- Position: Defender

Senior career*
Years	Team	Apps	(Gls)
1995–2008	Nippon TV Beleza	147	(16)
Total		147	(16)

International career
2001–2006	Japan	8	(0)
Medal record
Nippon TV Beleza
Winner	Nadeshiko League	2000
Winner	Nadeshiko League	2001
Winner	Nadeshiko League	2002
Winner	Nadeshiko League	2005
Winner	Nadeshiko League	2006
Winner	Nadeshiko League	2007
Winner	Nadeshiko League	2008
Runner-up	Nadeshiko League	1997
Runner-up	Nadeshiko League	1998
Runner-up	Nadeshiko League	1999
Runner-up	Nadeshiko League	2003
Runner-up	Nadeshiko League	2004
Winner	Nadeshiko League Cup	1996
Winner	Nadeshiko League Cup	1999
Winner	Nadeshiko League Cup	2007
Runner-up	Nadeshiko League Cup	1997
Winner	Empress's Cup	1997
Winner	Empress's Cup	2000
Winner	Empress's Cup	2004
Winner	Empress's Cup	2005
Winner	Empress's Cup	2007
Winner	Empress's Cup	2008
Runner-up	Empress's Cup	1996
Runner-up	Empress's Cup	2002
Runner-up	Empress's Cup	2003
Representing Japan
AFC Women's Asian Cup
Silver medal – second place	2001 Chinese Taipei
- * Club domestic league appearances and goals

Nao Shikata (四方 菜穂, Shikata Nao; born November 5, 1979) is a former Japanese football player. She played for Japan national team.

== Club career ==
Shikata was born in Kamakura on November 5, 1979. When she was a high school student, she joined Yomiuri-Seiyu Beleza (later Nippon TV Beleza) in 1995. She was selected Best Eleven in 2005. She retired in 2008.

== National team career ==
In December 2001, Shikata was selected Japan national team for 2001 AFC Championship. At this competition, on December 4, she debuted against Singapore. She also played at 2006 Asian Cup. This competition was her last game for Japan. She played 8 games for Japan until 2006.

== National team statistics ==
Japan national team
Year	Apps	Goals
2001	3	0
2002	0	0
2003	0	0
2004	1	0
2005	2	0
2006	2	0
Total	8	0
