= Mai Nakachi =

Japanese footballer

Mai Nakachi 中地 舞
Personal information
- Full name: Mai Nakachi
- Date of birth: 16 December 1980 (age 45)
- Place of birth: Chiba, Japan
- Height: 1.55 m (5 ft 1 in)
- Position: Defender

Youth career
- 1996: Yomiuri-Seiyu Beleza

Senior career*
Years	Team	Apps	(Gls)
1997–2010	Nippon TV Beleza	187	(0)
Total		187	(0)

International career
1997–2008	Japan	30	(0)
Medal record
Nippon TV Beleza
Winner	Nadeshiko League	2000
Winner	Nadeshiko League	2001
Winner	Nadeshiko League	2002
Winner	Nadeshiko League	2005
Winner	Nadeshiko League	2006
Winner	Nadeshiko League	2007
Winner	Nadeshiko League	2008
Winner	Nadeshiko League	2010
Runner-up	Nadeshiko League	1997
Runner-up	Nadeshiko League	1998
Runner-up	Nadeshiko League	1999
Runner-up	Nadeshiko League	2003
Runner-up	Nadeshiko League	2004
Runner-up	Nadeshiko League	2009
Winner	Nadeshiko League Cup	1999
Winner	Nadeshiko League Cup	2007
Winner	Nadeshiko League Cup	2010
Runner-up	Nadeshiko League Cup	1997
Winner	Empress's Cup	1997
Winner	Empress's Cup	2000
Winner	Empress's Cup	2004
Winner	Empress's Cup	2005
Winner	Empress's Cup	2007
Winner	Empress's Cup	2008
Winner	Empress's Cup	2009
Runner-up	Empress's Cup	2002
Runner-up	Empress's Cup	2003
Representing Japan
AFC Women's Asian Cup
Silver medal – second place	2001 Chinese Taipei
Bronze medal – third place	1997 China
Asian Games
Bronze medal – third place	1998 Bangkok	Team
Bronze medal – third place	2002 Busan	Team
- * Club domestic league appearances and goals

Mai Nakachi (中地 舞, Nakachi Mai; born 16 December 1980) is a former Japanese football player. She played for Japan national team.

== Club career ==
Nakachi was born in Chiba Prefecture on 16 December 1980. She played for Nippon TV Beleza from 1997 to 2010. She was selected Best Young Player award in 1997 season. She played 187 matches in L.League and she was selected Best Eleven 4 times (2000, 2001, 2003 and 2006). The club won L.League championship 8 times.

== National team career ==
In December 1997, when Nakachi was 16 years old, she was selected Japan national team for 1997 AFC Championship. At this competition, on 5 December, she debuted against Guam. She played at 1998, 2002 Asian Games, 2001 and 2003 AFC Championship. She was also a member of Japan for 1999 and 2003 World Cup. She played 30 games for Japan until 2008.

== National team statistics ==
Japan national team
Year	Apps	Goals
1997	2	0
1998	5	0
1999	3	0
2000	1	0
2001	8	0
2002	5	0
2003	5	0
2004	0	0
2005	0	0
2006	0	0
2007	0	0
2008	1	0
Total	30	0
