= Kanako Ito (footballer) =

Japanese footballer

Kanako Ito 伊藤 香菜子
Personal information
- Full name: Kanako Ito
- Date of birth: July 20, 1983 (age 43)
- Place of birth: Nerima, Tokyo, Japan
- Height: 1.60 m (5 ft 3 in)
- Position: Midfielder

Team information
- Current team: Chifure AS Elfen Saitama
- Number: 10

Senior career*
Years	Team	Apps	(Gls)
1999–2008	Nippon TV Beleza	113	(46)
2010–2012	Nippon TV Beleza	50	(13)
2013–2014	AS Elfen Saitama	46	(30)
2015	INAC Kobe Leonessa	20	(0)
2016	Chifure AS Elfen Saitama	17	(5)
2017	Nippon Sport Science University Fields Yokohama	18	(10)
2018–	Chifure AS Elfen Saitama	18	(3)
Total		282	(107)

International career
2002	Japan U-20	3	(0)
2001–2012	Japan	13	(3)
Medal record
Nippon TV Beleza
Winner	Nadeshiko League	2000
Winner	Nadeshiko League	2001
Winner	Nadeshiko League	2002
Winner	Nadeshiko League	2005
Winner	Nadeshiko League	2006
Winner	Nadeshiko League	2007
Winner	Nadeshiko League	2008
Winner	Nadeshiko League	2010
Runner-up	Nadeshiko League	1999
Runner-up	Nadeshiko League	2003
Runner-up	Nadeshiko League	2004
Runner-up	Nadeshiko League	2011
Runner-up	Nadeshiko League	2012
Winner	Nadeshiko League Cup	1999
Winner	Nadeshiko League Cup	2007
Winner	Nadeshiko League Cup	2010
Winner	Nadeshiko League Cup	2012
Winner	Empress's Cup	2000
Winner	Empress's Cup	2004
Winner	Empress's Cup	2005
Winner	Empress's Cup	2007
Winner	Empress's Cup	2008
Runner-up	Empress's Cup	2002
Runner-up	Empress's Cup	2003
INAC Kobe Leonessa
Winner	Empress's Cup	2015
Representing Japan
AFC Women's Asian Cup
Silver medal – second place	2001 Chinese Taipei
Asian Games
Bronze medal – third place	2002 Busan	Team
AFC U-19 Women's Championship
Gold medal – first place	2002 India
- * Club domestic league appearances and goals as of December 31, 2018

Kanako Ito (伊藤 香菜子, Itō Kanako; born July 20, 1983) is a Japanese footballer who has played as a midfielder. She plays for Chifure AS Elfen Saitama. She has also played for the Japan national team.

== Club career ==
Ito was born in Nerima, Tokyo on July 20, 1983. She joined NTV Beleza (later Nippon TV Beleza) in 1999. She was selected Best Eleven in 2001 and 2002. End of 2008 season, she left the club, but in 2010, she came back and she played until 2012. From 2013, she played for Chifure AS Elfen Saitama (2013-2014, 2016), INAC Kobe Leonessa (2015) and Nippon Sport Science University Fields Yokohama (2017). She is currently playing for Chifure AS Elfen Saitama from 2018.

== National team career ==
On August 5, 2001, when Ito was 18 years old, she debuted for the Japan national team against China. In 2002, she was selected by the Japan U-20 national team for the 2002 U-19 World Championship. She played 13 games and scored 3 goals for Japan until 2012.

== National team statistics ==
Japan national team
Year	Apps	Goals
2001	6	2
2002	3	0
2003	0	0
2004	0	0
2005	0	0
2006	0	0
2007	1	1
2008	0	0
2009	0	0
2010	0	0
2011	0	0
2012	3	0
Total	13	3
