= Japan women's national football team results (2000–2009) =

This page records the details of the Japan women's national football team from 2000 to 2009.

== 2000 ==
=== Results ===
2000.05.31	Japan	0–1	Australia	Australia
			? (?)

2000.06.02	Japan	2–1	New Zealand	Australia
	Nishina (?); Yamagishi (?)		? (?)

2000.06.04	Japan	0–2	China	Australia
			? (?) ? (?)

2000.06.08	Japan	1–4	United States	Australia
	Obe (?)		? (?) ? (?) ? (?) ? (?)

2000.06.10	Japan	1–5	Canada	Australia
	Sato (?)		? (?) ? (?) ? (?) ? (?) ? (?)

2000.12.17	Japan	1–1	United States	United States
	Sawa (?)		? (?)

=== Players statistics ===
Player	−1999	05.31	06.02	06.04	06.08	06.10	12.17	2000	Total
Homare Sawa	53(25)	-	-	-	-	-	O(1)	1(1)	54(26)
Kae Nishina	42(1)	-	O(1)	O	O	O	-	4(1)	46(2)
Yumi Obe	38(4)	O	O	O	O(1)	O	O	6(1)	44(5)
Tomoe Sakai	29(0)	-	-	-	-	-	O	1(0)	30(0)
Nozomi Yamago	24(0)	O	-	O	O	-	O	4(0)	28(0)
Hiromi Isozaki	23(0)	O	-	O	O	O	O	5(0)	28(0)
Mito Isaka	21(8)	O	O	O	O	O	-	5(0)	26(8)
Ayumi Hara	15(1)	O	O	O	O	O	O	6(0)	21(1)
Shiho Onodera	11(0)	-	O	-	-	O	-	2(0)	13(0)
Miyuki Yanagita	10(2)	O	-	O	-	O	-	3(0)	13(2)
Mai Nakachi	10(0)	-	-	-	-	-	O	1(0)	11(0)
Yasuyo Yamagishi	9(4)	O	O(1)	O	O	O	-	5(1)	14(5)
Yayoi Kobayashi	8(2)	-	-	-	-	-	O	1(0)	9(2)
Rie Kimura	8(0)	O	O	O	O	O	O	6(0)	14(0)
Tomomi Fujimura	7(0)	O	O	O	O	O	O	6(0)	13(0)
Yoshie Kasajima	5(1)	O	O	O	O	-	O	5(0)	10(1)
Megumi Torigoe	5(0)	-	O	-	-	O	-	2(0)	7(0)
Kozue Ando	1(0)	O	O	O	O	O	-	5(0)	6(0)
Yuka Yamazaki	0(0)	O	O	O	O	O	O	6(0)	6(0)
Mio Otani	0(0)	O	O	O	O	O	-	5(0)	5(0)
Harue Sato	0(0)	O	-	O	O	O(1)	-	4(1)	4(1)
Eriko Arakawa	0(0)	-	-	-	-	O	O	2(0)	2(0)
Megumi Ogawa	0(0)	-	-	-	-	-	O	1(0)	1(0)

== 2001 ==
=== Results ===
2001.03.16	Japan	2–0	Chinese Taipei	Chinese Taipei
	Otani (?); Kasajima (?)

2001.08.03	Japan	1–1	South Korea	South Korea
	Kobayashi (?)		? (?)

2001.08.05	Japan	2–2	China	South Korea
	Sato (?); Isaka (?)		? (?) ? (?)

2001.08.08	Japan	1–1	Brazil	South Korea
	Isozaki (?)		? (?)

2001.09.07	Japan	0–1	Germany	United States
			? (?)

2001.09.09	Japan	0–3	China	United States
			? (?) ? (?) ? (?)

2001.12.04	Japan	14–0	Singapore	Chinese Taipei
	Kasajima (?); Sawa (?); Otani (?); Isaka (?); Sato (?); Obe (?)

2001.12.08	Japan	11–0	Guam	Chinese Taipei
	Sawa (?); Isaka (?); Ito (?); Otani (?); Fujimura (?); Isozaki (?)

2001.12.10	Japan	0–1	North Korea	Chinese Taipei
			? (?)

2001.12.12	Japan	3–1	Vietnam	Chinese Taipei
	Ito (?); Otani (?)		? (?)

2001.12.14	Japan	2–1	South Korea	Chinese Taipei
	Kobayashi (?); Otani (?)		? (?)

2001.12.16	Japan	0–2	North Korea	Chinese Taipei
			? (?) ? (?)

=== Players statistics ===
Player	−2000	03.16	08.03	08.05	08.08	09.07	09.09	12.04	12.08	12.10	12.12	12.14	12.16	2001	Total
Homare Sawa	54(26)	-	-	-	-	O	O	O(4)	O(2)	O	O	O	O	8(6)	62(32)
Yumi Obe	44(5)	O	O	O	O	O	O	O(1)	O	O	O	O	O	12(1)	56(6)
Tomoe Sakai	30(0)	O	-	O	O	O	-	-	-	-	-	-	-	4(0)	34(0)
Hiromi Isozaki	28(0)	O	O	-	O(1)	O	O	O	O(2)	O	-	O	O	10(3)	38(3)
Nozomi Yamago	28(0)	O	O	O	O	O	O	O	-	O	-	O	O	10(0)	38(0)
Mito Isaka	26(8)	-	O	O(1)	O	O	O	O(4)	O(2)	O	O	O	O	11(7)	37(15)
Ayumi Hara	21(1)	O	O	O	O	-	-	-	-	-	-	-	-	4(0)	25(1)
Yasuyo Yamagishi	14(5)	O	O	O	-	O	O	O	O	O	O	O	O	11(0)	25(5)
Rie Kimura	14(0)	O	O	O	-	-	-	-	O	O	-	O	O	7(0)	21(0)
Miyuki Yanagita	13(2)	-	-	-	-	-	-	-	-	-	-	-	O	1(0)	14(2)
Tomomi Fujimura	13(0)	O	-	-	-	-	-	-	O(1)	O	O	-	-	4(1)	17(1)
Shiho Onodera	13(0)	O	-	-	-	-	-	-	O	-	O	-	-	3(0)	16(0)
Mai Nakachi	11(0)	O	O	O	O	O	O	O	-	-	O	-	-	8(0)	19(0)
Yoshie Kasajima	10(1)	O(1)	-	O	O	O	O	O(1)	-	O	-	O	O	9(2)	19(3)
Yayoi Kobayashi	9(2)	O	O(1)	O	O	O	O	O	O	O	O	O(1)	O	12(2)	21(4)
Megumi Torigoe	7(0)	O	-	-	-	-	-	-	-	-	-	-	-	1(0)	8(0)
Kazumi Kishi	6(2)	-	O	O	O	-	-	-	-	-	-	-	-	3(0)	9(2)
Yuka Yamazaki	6(0)	O	-	-	-	-	-	-	-	-	-	-	-	1(0)	7(0)
Mio Otani	5(0)	O(1)	O	-	O	O	O	O(2)	O(3)	O	O(2)	O(1)	O	11(9)	16(9)
Harue Sato	4(1)	O	O	O(1)	-	O	O	O(2)	-	O	O	-	O	9(3)	13(4)
Naoko Kawakami	0(0)	O	O	-	O	-	O	O	O	O	O	O	O	10(0)	10(0)
Kanako Ito	0(0)	-	-	O	O	-	O	O	O(1)	-	O(1)	-	-	6(2)	6(2)
Yuka Miyazaki	0(0)	-	-	O	O	-	O	-	O	-	O	-	-	5(0)	5(0)
Noriko Baba	0(0)	-	O	-	O	O	O	-	-	-	-	-	-	4(0)	4(0)
Yuki Tsuchihashi	0(0)	-	-	O	-	O	O	-	-	-	-	O	-	4(0)	4(0)
Nao Shikata	0(0)	-	-	-	-	-	-	O	O	-	O	-	-	3(0)	3(0)

== 2002 ==
=== Results ===
2002.04.03	Japan	0–1	France	France
			? (?)

2002.04.06	Japan	1–1	Australia	France
	Kasajima (?)		? (?)

2002.04.09	Japan	3–2	Canada	France
	Yanagita (?); Sawa (?)		? (?) ? (?)

2002.08.27	Japan	0–4	China	China
			? (?) ? (?) ? (?) ? (?)

2002.08.29	Japan	0–1	Russia	China
			? (?)

2002.08.31	Japan	0–0	South Korea	China

2002.10.02	Japan	0–1	North Korea	South Korea
			? (?)

2002.10.04	Japan	3–0	Vietnam	South Korea
	Otani (?); Sawa (?)

2002.10.07	Japan	1–0	South Korea	South Korea
	Sawa (?)

2002.10.09	Japan	2–2	China	South Korea
	Miyamoto (?); Sawa (?)		? (?) ? (?)

2002.10.11	Japan	2–0	Chinese Taipei	South Korea
	Kobayashi (?); Miyazaki (?)

=== Players statistics ===
Player	−2001	04.03	04.06	04.09	08.27	08.29	08.31	10.02	10.04	10.07	10.09	10.11	2002	Total
Homare Sawa	62(32)	O	O	O(2)	-	-	-	O	O(1)	O(1)	O(1)	O	8(5)	70(37)
Yumi Obe	56(6)	O	O	O	O	-	O	O	O	O	O	O	10(0)	66(6)
Hiromi Isozaki	38(3)	O	O	O	O	O	O	-	-	-	-	-	6(0)	44(3)
Nozomi Yamago	38(0)	O	-	O	O	O	-	O	-	O	O	O	8(0)	46(0)
Mito Isaka	37(15)	O	O	-	O	O	O	-	O	O	O	O	9(0)	46(15)
Tomoe Sakai	34(0)	O	-	O	O	O	O	O	-	O	O	O	9(0)	43(0)
Tomomi Miyamoto	30(5)	-	-	-	O	O	O	O	O	O	O(1)	-	7(1)	37(6)
Yasuyo Yamagishi	25(5)	O	O	O	O	O	O	O	O	O	O	O	11(0)	36(5)
Ayumi Hara	25(1)	-	-	-	O	-	O	-	-	-	-	-	2(0)	27(1)
Yayoi Kobayashi	21(4)	O	O	O	O	O	O	O	O	O	O	O(1)	11(1)	32(5)
Yoshie Kasajima	19(3)	-	O(1)	O	O	O	-	O	-	-	-	-	5(1)	24(4)
Mai Nakachi	19(0)	O	-	O	O	-	O	-	O	-	-	-	5(0)	24(0)
Tomomi Fujimura	17(1)	O	O	O	-	-	-	-	-	-	-	-	3(0)	20(1)
Mio Otani	16(9)	O	O	-	O	O	O	O	O(2)	O	O	O	10(2)	26(11)
Shiho Onodera	16(0)	-	O	-	-	-	O	-	-	-	-	-	2(0)	18(0)
Miyuki Yanagita	14(2)	-	O	O(1)	O	O	O	O	O	O	O	O	10(1)	24(3)
Harue Sato	13(4)	-	O	O	O	-	O	-	-	-	-	-	4(0)	17(4)
Naoko Kawakami	10(0)	O	O	-	O	O	O	O	O	O	O	O	10(0)	20(0)
Kanako Ito	6(2)	-	-	-	-	-	-	O	O	-	-	O	3(0)	9(2)
Kozue Ando	6(0)	O	O	-	O	O	O	-	-	-	-	-	5(0)	11(0)
Yuka Miyazaki	5(0)	-	-	-	-	-	-	O	O	O	O	O(1)	5(1)	10(1)
Noriko Baba	4(0)	O	-	-	-	-	-	-	-	-	-	-	1(0)	5(0)
Mai Aizawa	3(4)	-	-	-	-	O	-	-	-	-	-	O	2(0)	5(4)
Karina Maruyama	0(0)	-	-	-	-	-	-	O	O	O	O	O	5(0)	5(0)
Miho Fukumoto	0(0)	-	-	-	-	-	-	-	O	-	-	-	1(0)	1(0)

== 2003 ==
=== Results ===
2003.01.12	Japan	0–0	United States	United States

2003.03.19	Japan	9–0	Thailand	Thailand
	Yamagishi (?); Arakawa (?); Ono (?); Suzuki (?); Ando (?); Maruyama (?)

2003.06.09	Japan	15–0	Philippines	Thailand
	Otani (?); Arakawa (?); Kobayashi (?); Miyazaki (?); Sawa (?); Miyamoto (?); Miyama (?); Sakai (?)

2003.06.11	Japan	7–0	Guam	Thailand
	Sakai (?); Sawa (?); Maruyama (?); Yano (?); Arakawa (?)

2003.06.13	Japan	7–0	Myanmar	Thailand
	Otani (?); Kobayashi (?); Sawa (?); Isozaki (?); Maruyama (?)

2003.06.15	Japan	5–0	Chinese Taipei	Thailand
	Sawa (?); Kobayashi (?); Maruyama (?) (?)

2003.06.19	Japan	0–3	North Korea	Thailand
			? (?) ? (?) ? (?)

2003.06.21	Japan	0–1	South Korea	Thailand
			? (?)

2003.07.05	Japan	2–2	Mexico	Mexico
	Kobayashi (?); Miyamoto (?)		? (?) ? (?)

2003.07.12	Japan	2–0	Mexico	Tokyo, Japan
	Sawa (?); Maruyama (?)			Stadium: National Stadium

2003.07.22	Japan	5–0	South Korea	Miyagi, Japan
	Otani (?); Miyamoto (?); Arakawa (?); Miyama (?)			Stadium: Sendai Stadium

2003.07.27	Japan	0–0	Australia	Miyagi, Japan
				Stadium: Sendai Stadium

2003.09.21	Japan	6–0	Argentina	United States
	Otani (?); Yamamoto (?); Sawa (?)

2003.09.25	Japan	0–3	Germany	United States
			? (?) ? (?) ? (?)

2003.09.27	Japan	1–3	Canada	United States
	Sawa (?)		? (?) ? (?) ? (?)

=== Players statistics ===
Player	−2002	01.12	03.19	06.09	06.11	06.13	06.15	06.19	06.21	07.05	07.12	07.22	07.27	09.21	09.25	09.27	2003	Total
Homare Sawa	70(37)	O	-	O(1)	O(2)	O(1)	O(2)	O	O	O	O(1)	-	-	O(2)	O	O(1)	12(10)	82(47)
Yumi Obe	66(6)	O	O	O	O	O	O	O	O	O	O	O	O	O	O	O	15(0)	81(6)
Nozomi Yamago	46(0)	O	O	O	O	O	O	O	O	O	O	O	O	O	O	O	15(0)	61(0)
Hiromi Isozaki	44(3)	-	O	O	-	O(1)	-	O	O	O	O	O	-	O	O	O	11(1)	55(4)
Tomoe Sakai	43(0)	O	O	O(1)	O(1)	O	O	O	-	O	O	O	O	O	O	O	14(2)	57(2)
Tomomi Miyamoto	37(6)	-	O	O(1)	O	O	O	O	O	O(1)	O	O(1)	O	O	O	O	14(3)	51(9)
Yasuyo Yamagishi	36(5)	O	O(1)	-	O	O	O	O	O	-	-	O	O	O	O	O	12(1)	48(6)
Yayoi Kobayashi	32(5)	O	-	O(2)	O	O(2)	O(1)	O	O	O(1)	O	O	O	O	O	O	14(6)	46(11)
Mio Otani	26(11)	O	O	O(7)	-	O(2)	O	O	O	O	O	O(1)	O	O(3)	O	O	14(13)	40(24)
Miyuki Yanagita	24(3)	-	-	-	-	-	-	-	-	-	-	-	O	-	O	O	3(0)	27(3)
Mai Nakachi	24(0)	O	-	-	O	-	O	O	-	-	-	O	-	-	-	-	5(0)	29(0)
Naoko Kawakami	20(0)	O	O	O	O	O	O	-	O	O	O	O	O	O	O	O	14(0)	34(0)
Shiho Onodera	18(0)	-	O	-	-	-	-	-	-	-	-	O	-	-	-	-	2(0)	20(0)
Kozue Ando	11(0)	-	O(2)	-	-	-	-	-	-	-	-	-	-	-	-	-	1(2)	12(2)
Yuka Miyazaki	10(1)	O	O	O(1)	-	O	-	-	-	-	-	O	O	-	-	-	6(1)	16(2)
Karina Maruyama	5(0)	O	O(1)	O	O(2)	O(1)	O(1)	O	O	-	O(1)	O	O	O	-	-	12(6)	17(6)
Eriko Arakawa	2(0)	-	O(1)	O(1)	O(1)	O	O	O	O	-	O	O(2)	O	O	O	O	13(5)	15(5)
Miho Fukumoto	1(0)	-	O	-	-	-	-	-	-	-	-	-	-	-	-	-	1(0)	2(0)
Emi Yamamoto	0(0)	O	O	O	-	O	O	O	O	O	O	O	O	O(1)	O	O	14(1)	14(1)
Kyoko Yano	0(0)	-	-	-	O(1)	-	O	-	O	O	O	O	O	O	O	-	9(1)	9(1)
Aya Miyama	0(0)	-	O	O(1)	O	-	-	O	-	-	-	O(1)	-	-	-	O	6(2)	6(2)
Shinobu Ono	0(0)	O	O(2)	-	O	-	-	-	O	O	-	-	-	-	-	-	5(2)	5(2)
Tomoko Suzuki	0(0)	O	O(2)	-	-	-	-	-	-	-	-	-	-	-	-	-	2(2)	2(2)
Akiko Sudo	0(0)	O	O	-	-	-	-	-	-	-	-	-	-	-	-	-	2(0)	2(0)
Hiroko Sano	0(0)	-	O	-	-	-	-	-	-	-	-	-	-	-	-	-	1(0)	1(0)
Akiko Niwata	0(0)	-	O	-	-	-	-	-	-	-	-	-	-	-	-	-	1(0)	1(0)
Eriko Sato	0(0)	-	-	-	-	-	-	-	-	-	-	-	O	-	-	-	1(0)	1(0)

== 2004 ==
=== Results ===
2004.04.18	Japan	7–0	Vietnam	Tokyo, Japan
	Miyamoto (?); Otani (?); Maruyama (?); Yamamoto (?); Sawa (?)			Stadium: Komazawa Olympic Park Stadium

2004.04.22	Japan	6–0	Thailand	Tokyo, Japan
	Maruyama (?); Ando (?); Kobayashi (?); Otani (?); Yamamoto (?)			Stadium: National Stadium

2004.04.24	Japan	3–0	North Korea	Tokyo, Japan
	Arakawa (?) (?); Otani (?)			Stadium: National Stadium

2004.04.26	Japan	0–1	China	Hiroshima, Japan
			? (?)	Stadium: Hiroshima Big Arch

2004.06.06	Japan	1–1	United States	United States
	Arakawa (?)		? (?)

2004.07.30	Japan	3–0	Canada	Tokyo, Japan
	Otani (?) (?)			Stadium: National Stadium

2004.08.06	Japan	2–0	Netherlands	Netherlands
	Otani (?) ? (?)

2004.08.11	Japan	1–0	Sweden	Greece
	Arakawa (?)

2004.08.14	Japan	0–1	Nigeria	Greece
			? (?)

2004.08.20	Japan	1–2	United States	Greece
	Yamamoto (?)		? (?) ? (?)

2004.12.18	Japan	11–0	Chinese Taipei	Tokyo, Japan
	Arakawa (?); Miyama (?); Ono (?); Sawa (?); Kitamoto (?)			Stadium: Nishigaoka Soccer Stadium

=== Players statistics ===
Player	−2003	04.18	04.22	04.24	04.26	06.06	07.30	08.06	08.11	08.14	08.20	12.18	2004	Total
Homare Sawa	82(47)	O(1)	-	O	O	-	-	O	O	O	O	O(1)	8(2)	90(49)
Yumi Obe	81(6)	-	O	-	O	-	O	O	-	-	-	-	4(0)	85(6)
Nozomi Yamago	61(0)	O	-	O	O	O	O	O	O	O	O	O	10(0)	71(0)
Tomoe Sakai	57(2)	O	O	O	O	O	O	O	O	O	O	O	11(0)	68(2)
Hiromi Isozaki	55(4)	O	-	O	O	O	O	O	O	O	O	O	10(0)	65(4)
Tomomi Miyamoto	51(9)	O(2)	-	O	O	O	O	O	O	O	O	-	9(2)	60(11)
Yasuyo Yamagishi	48(6)	O	O	O	-	O	O	O	O	O	O	O	10(0)	58(6)
Yayoi Kobayashi	46(11)	O	O(1)	-	O	O	O	O	O	O	-	-	8(1)	54(12)
Mio Otani	40(24)	O(2)	O(1)	O(1)	O	O	O(2)	O(1)	O	O	O	-	10(7)	50(31)
Naoko Kawakami	34(0)	O	-	O	O	O	O	O	O	O	O	O	10(0)	44(0)
Miyuki Yanagita	27(3)	O	O	O	O	O	O	O	O	O	O	O	11(0)	38(3)
Ayumi Hara	27(1)	-	-	-	-	-	-	-	-	-	-	O	1(0)	28(1)
Shiho Onodera	20(0)	-	O	-	-	-	O	O	-	-	-	-	3(0)	23(0)
Karina Maruyama	17(6)	O(1)	O(2)	O	O	O	O	O	O	O	O	O	11(3)	28(9)
Yuka Miyazaki	16(2)	-	O	-	-	-	-	-	-	-	-	-	1(0)	17(2)
Eriko Arakawa	15(5)	O	-	O(1)	O	O(1)	O	O	O(1)	O	O	O(2)	10(5)	25(10)
Emi Yamamoto	14(1)	O(1)	O(1)	O	O	O	-	O	-	O	O(1)	-	8(3)	22(4)
Kozue Ando	12(2)	-	O(1)	-	-	O	O	O	O	-	-	O	6(1)	18(3)
Kyoko Yano	9(1)	-	O	O	O	O	-	-	-	-	O	-	5(0)	14(1)
Aya Miyama	6(2)	-	-	-	-	-	-	-	-	-	-	O(2)	1(2)	7(4)
Shinobu Ono	5(2)	-	-	-	-	-	-	-	-	-	-	O(3)	1(3)	6(5)
Nao Shikata	3(0)	-	-	-	-	-	-	-	-	-	-	O	1(0)	4(0)
Aya Shimokozuru	0(0)	O	O	O	-	O	O	O	O	O	O	O	10(0)	10(0)
Ayako Kitamoto	0(0)	-	-	-	-	O	-	-	-	-	-	O(3)	2(3)	2(3)
Yuki Nagasato	0(0)	-	O	-	-	-	-	-	-	-	-	-	1(0)	1(0)
Nayuha Toyoda	0(0)	-	-	-	-	-	-	-	-	-	-	O	1(0)	1(0)

== 2005 ==
=== Results ===
2005.03.26	Japan	2–0	Australia	Australia
	Ando (?); Yanagita (?)

2005.03.29	Japan	1–2	Australia	Australia
	Miyama (?)		? (?) ? (?)

2005.05.21	Japan	6–0	New Zealand	Tokyo, Japan
	Sawa (?); Nagasato (?); Miyama (?); Sudo (?)			Stadium: Nishigaoka Soccer Stadium

2005.05.26	Japan	4–2	Russia	Russia
	(?); Yanagita (?); Nagasato (?)		? (?) ? (?)

2005.05.28	Japan	2–0	Russia	Russia
	Nagasato (?); Sawa (?)

2005.07.23	Japan	4–2	Australia	Tokyo, Japan
	Nagasato (?); Ono (?); Sakai (?)		? (?) ? (?)	Stadium: Nishigaoka Soccer Stadium

2005.08.01	Japan	0–1	North Korea	South Korea
			? (?)

2005.08.03	Japan	0–0	China	South Korea

2005.08.06	Japan	0–0	South Korea	South Korea

=== Players statistics ===
Player	−2004	03.26	03.29	05.21	05.26	05.28	07.23	08.01	08.03	08.06	2005	Total
Homare Sawa	90(49)	O	O	O(2)	O	O(1)	O	O	O	O	9(3)	99(52)
Nozomi Yamago	71(0)	O	-	-	-	O	-	O	O	O	5(0)	76(0)
Tomoe Sakai	68(2)	O	O	O	O	O	O(1)	O	O	O	9(1)	77(3)
Hiromi Isozaki	65(4)	O	O	O	O	O	O	O	O	O	9(0)	74(4)
Yasuyo Yamagishi	58(6)	-	-	O	-	O	-	-	-	-	2(0)	60(6)
Mio Otani	50(31)	-	-	O	O	O	O	O	O	O	7(0)	57(31)
Naoko Kawakami	44(0)	O	O	O	O	-	-	-	-	-	4(0)	48(0)
Miyuki Yanagita	38(3)	O(1)	O	O	O(2)	O	O	O	O	O	9(3)	47(6)
Karina Maruyama	28(9)	-	-	-	-	-	O	O	-	O	3(0)	31(9)
Ayumi Hara	28(1)	-	O	-	-	-	-	-	-	-	1(0)	29(1)
Kozue Ando	18(3)	O(1)	O	O	O	O	O	O	O	O	9(1)	27(4)
Kyoko Yano	14(1)	-	-	-	O	O	-	O	O	O	5(0)	19(1)
Aya Shimokozuru	10(0)	-	-	-	-	O	O	O	O	O	5(0)	15(0)
Aya Miyama	7(4)	O	O(1)	O(1)	O	O	O	O	O	O	9(2)	16(6)
Shinobu Ono	6(5)	-	-	O	O	O	O(1)	O	O	O	7(1)	13(6)
Nao Shikata	4(0)	O	O	-	-	-	-	-	-	-	2(0)	6(0)
Ayako Kitamoto	2(3)	O	O	O	-	O	-	-	-	-	4(0)	6(3)
Tomoko Suzuki	2(2)	O	-	-	-	-	-	-	-	-	1(0)	3(2)
Akiko Sudo	2(0)	O	O	O(1)	O	O	-	-	-	-	5(1)	7(1)
Miho Fukumoto	2(0)	-	O	O	O	-	O	-	-	-	4(0)	6(0)
Yuki Nagasato	1(0)	O	O	O(2)	O(1)	O(1)	O(2)	O	O	O	9(6)	10(6)
Nayuha Toyoda	1(0)	O	O	-	-	-	O	O	-	-	4(0)	5(0)
Rumi Utsugi	0(0)	-	-	O	O	-	O	-	O	O	5(0)	5(0)
Maiko Nakaoka	0(0)	-	-	O	O	O	-	-	-	-	3(0)	3(0)
Saiko Takahashi	0(0)	-	O	O	-	-	-	-	-	-	2(0)	2(0)
Yukari Kinga	0(0)	-	O	-	-	-	-	-	-	-	1(0)	1(0)
Natsumi Hara	0(0)	-	O	-	-	-	-	-	-	-	1(0)	1(0)

== 2006 ==
=== Results ===
2006.02.18	Japan	2–0	Russia	Shizuoka, Japan
	Nagasato (?) (?)			Stadium: Shizuoka Stadium

2006.03.10	Japan	4–0	Scotland	Italy
	Sakai (?); Sawa (?); Ando (?); Arakawa (?)

2006.03.12	Japan	0–1	Italy	Italy
			? (?)

2006.05.07	Japan	1–3	United States	Kumamoto, Japan
	Iwashimizu (?)		? (?) ? (?) ? (?)	Stadium: Kumamoto Athletics Stadium

2006.05.09	Japan	0–1	United States	Osaka, Japan
			? (?)	Stadium: Osaka Nagai Stadium

2006.07.19	Japan	5–0	Vietnam	Australia
	Sawa (?); Sakaguchi (?); Nagasato (?)

2006.07.21	Japan	11–1	Chinese Taipei	Australia
	Ono (?); Nagasato (?); Sawa (?); Sakaguchi (?); Yanagita (?)		? (?)

2006.07.23	Japan	1–0	China	Australia
	Miyama (?)

2006.07.27	Japan	0–2	Australia	Australia
			? (?) ? (?)

2006.07.30	Japan	2–3	North Korea	Australia
	Ando (?); Nagasato (?)		? (?) ? (?) ? (?)

2006.11.19	Japan	1–0	Australia	Chiba, Japan
	Ono (?)			Stadium: Chiba Soga Football Stadium

2006.11.23	Japan	3–6	Germany	Germany
	Ono (?); Miyama (?); Maruyama (?)		? (?) ? (?) ? (?) ? (?) ? (?) ? (?)

2006.11.30	Japan	13–0	Jordan	Qatar
	Yanagita (?); Miyama (?); Sudo (?); Arakawa (?); Sakaguchi (?); Sawa (?); Sakai (?)

2006.12.04	Japan	4–0	Thailand	Qatar
	Sakaguchi (?); Ono (?); Arakawa (?); Ando (?)

2006.12.07	Japan	1–0	China	Qatar
	Iwashimizu (?)

2006.12.10	Japan	3–1	South Korea	Qatar
	Iwashimizu (?); Yanagita (?); Nagasato (?)		? (?)

2006.12.13	Japan	0–0 (pen 2–4)	North Korea	Qatar

=== Players statistics ===
Player	−2005	02.18	03.10	03.12	05.07	05.09	07.19	07.21	07.23	07.27	07.30	11.19	11.23	11.30	12.04	12.07	12.10	12.13	2006	Total
Homare Sawa	99(52)	O	O(1)	O	O	O	O(2)	O(2)	O	O	O	O	O	O(2)	O	O	O	O	17(7)	116(59)
Nozomi Yamago	76(0)	O	O	O	-	-	-	-	-	-	-	-	-	O	-	-	-	-	4(0)	80(0)
Tomoe Sakai	77(3)	O	O(1)	O	O	O	O	O	-	O	O	O	O	O(1)	O	O	O	O	16(2)	93(5)
Hiromi Isozaki	74(4)	O	O	O	O	O	O	O	O	O	O	O	O	O	O	O	O	O	17(0)	91(4)
Tomomi Miyamoto	60(11)	-	-	-	-	-	-	-	-	-	-	O	-	-	-	-	-	-	1(0)	61(11)
Mio Otani	57(31)	O	O	O	O	O	O	-	O	O	O	-	-	-	-	-	-	-	9(0)	66(31)
Miyuki Yanagita	47(6)	O	O	O	-	-	O	O(1)	O	O	O	O	O	O(2)	O	O	O(1)	O	15(4)	62(10)
Karina Maruyama	31(9)	O	O	O	O	-	-	-	-	-	-	O	O(1)	O	O	O	-	-	9(1)	40(10)
Kozue Ando	27(4)	O	O(1)	O	O	O	-	O	O	O	O(1)	O	O	O	O(1)	O	O	O	16(3)	43(7)
Eriko Arakawa	25(10)	O	O(1)	O	O	O	O	-	-	-	O	O	O	O(1)	O(1)	O	O	O	14(3)	39(13)
Kyoko Yano	19(1)	O	O	O	O	O	O	O	O	O	O	O	O	-	O	O	O	O	16(0)	35(1)
Aya Miyama	16(6)	O	O	O	O	O	O	O	O(1)	O	O	O	O(1)	O(1)	O	O	O	O	17(3)	33(9)
Aya Shimokozuru	15(0)	O	O	O	-	-	O	O	O	O	O	O	O	-	O	-	-	-	11(0)	26(0)
Shinobu Ono	13(6)	O	O	O	O	O	O	O(1)	O	O	O	O(1)	O(1)	-	O(1)	O	O	O	16(4)	29(10)
Yuki Nagasato	10(6)	O(1)	-	-	O	O	O(1)	O(5)	O	O	O(1)	O	O	-	-	O	O(1)	O	13(9)	23(15)
Akiko Sudo	7(1)	-	-	-	-	-	-	-	-	-	-	-	-	O(1)	-	-	-	-	1(1)	8(2)
Miho Fukumoto	6(0)	-	-	-	O	O	O	O	O	O	O	O	O	-	O	O	O	O	13(0)	19(0)
Nao Shikata	6(0)	-	O	-	-	-	-	O	-	-	-	-	-	-	-	-	-	-	2(0)	8(0)
Rumi Utsugi	5(0)	-	-	-	O	O	-	-	-	-	-	-	-	-	-	-	-	-	2(0)	7(0)
Maiko Nakaoka	3(0)	-	O	-	-	O	-	O	O	O	-	-	O	O	-	O	O	O	10(0)	13(0)
Yukari Kinga	1(0)	O	O	-	-	-	-	-	-	-	-	-	-	-	-	-	-	-	2(0)	3(0)
Azusa Iwashimizu	0(0)	O	-	-	O(1)	O	O	-	-	-	-	-	O	O	O	O(1)	O(1)	O	10(3)	10(3)
Mizuho Sakaguchi	0(0)	-	-	-	-	-	O(2)	O(2)	O	O	O	-	-	O(5)	O(1)	-	-	-	7(10)	7(10)

== 2007 ==
=== Results ===
2007.02.09	Japan	1–0	Norway	Cyprus
	Ono (?)

2007.02.12	Japan	2–2	Sweden	Cyprus
	Miyama (?); Arakawa (?)		? (?) ? (?)

2007.02.14	Japan	2–0	Scotland	Cyprus
	Sakaguchi (?)

2007.03.10	Japan	2–0	Mexico	Tokyo, Japan
	Sawa (?); Miyama (?)			Stadium: National Stadium

2007.03.17	Japan	1–2	Mexico	Mexico
	Arakawa (?)		? (?) ? (?)

2007.04.07	Japan	2–0	Vietnam	Tokyo, Japan
	Sawa (?); Sakai (?)			Stadium: National Stadium

2007.04.15	Japan	4–0	Thailand	Thailand
	Sawa (?); Arakawa (?); Ono (?)

2007.06.03	Japan	6–1	South Korea	Tokyo, Japan
	Miyamoto (?); Ono (?); Arakawa (?) (?); Ito (?); Sawa (?)		? (?)	Stadium: National Stadium

2007.06.10	Japan	2–2	South Korea	South Korea
	Ono (?); Miyama (?)		? (?) ? (?)

2007.07.28	Japan	1–4	United States	United States
	Nagasato (?)		? (?) ? (?) ? (?) ? (?)

2007.08.04	Japan	8–0	Vietnam	Vietnam
	Sakai (?); Iwashimizu (?); Ono (?); Miyama (?); Miyamoto (?); Sawa (?); Nagasato (?)

2007.08.12	Japan	5–0	Thailand	Tokyo, Japan
	Ono (?); Nagasato (?); Yanagita (?); Sawa (?); Sakaguchi (?)			Stadium: National Stadium

2007.08.30	Japan	0–0	Canada	Tokyo, Japan
				Stadium: National Stadium

2007.09.02	Japan	2–1	Brazil	Chiba, Japan
	Iwashimizu (?) (?)		? (?)	Stadium: Chiba Soga Football Stadium

2007.09.11	Japan	2–2	England	China
	Miyama (?)		? (?) ? (?)

2007.09.14	Japan	1–0	Argentina	China
	Nagasato (?)

2007.09.17	Japan	0–2	Germany	China
			? (?) ? (?)

=== Players statistics ===
Player	−2006	02.09	02.12	02.14	03.10	03.17	04.07	04.15	06.03	06.10	07.28	08.04	08.12	08.30	09.02	09.11	09.14	09.17	2007	Total
Homare Sawa	116(59)	-	-	-	O(1)	O	O(1)	O(1)	O(1)	O	O	O(1)	O(1)	O	O	O	O	O	14(6)	130(65)
Tomoe Sakai	93(5)	O	O	O	O	O	O(1)	O	O	O	O	O(1)	O	O	O	O	O	O	17(2)	110(7)
Hiromi Isozaki	91(4)	O	O	-	O	O	O	O	O	O	O	O	O	O	O	O	O	O	16(0)	107(4)
Nozomi Yamago	80(0)	-	-	O	-	-	-	-	-	O	-	-	O	-	-	-	-	-	3(0)	83(0)
Mio Otani	66(31)	-	O	-	-	O	-	O	O	O	-	-	-	O	O	-	-	-	7(0)	73(31)
Miyuki Yanagita	62(10)	O	O	-	O	O	O	O	O	O	O	O	O(1)	O	O	-	-	O	14(1)	76(11)
Tomomi Miyamoto	61(11)	O	O	-	O	O	O	O	O(1)	O	O	O(1)	O	O	O	O	O	O	16(2)	77(13)
Kozue Ando	43(7)	-	O	O	-	-	O	-	O	-	O	-	O	-	O	O	O	-	9(0)	52(7)
Karina Maruyama	40(10)	-	-	O	-	-	-	-	-	-	-	-	-	-	-	-	-	-	1(0)	41(10)
Eriko Arakawa	39(13)	O	O(1)	-	O	O(1)	O	O(1)	O(1)	O	O	O	-	O	O	O	O	O	15(4)	54(17)
Kyoko Yano	35(1)	-	-	-	-	O	-	-	-	O	O	-	-	O	O	-	O	-	6(0)	41(1)
Aya Miyama	33(9)	O	O(1)	O	O(1)	O	O	O	O	O(1)	O	O(1)	O	O	O	O(2)	O	O	17(6)	50(15)
Shinobu Ono	29(10)	O(1)	O	O	O	O	O	O(2)	O(1)	O(1)	O	O(2)	O(1)	O	O	O	O	O	17(8)	46(18)
Ayumi Hara	29(1)	-	-	-	-	-	-	-	-	-	-	O	O	-	O	O	-	O	5(0)	34(1)
Aya Shimokozuru	26(0)	-	-	O	-	-	-	-	-	-	-	-	-	-	-	-	-	-	1(0)	27(0)
Yuki Nagasato	23(15)	O	O	O	O	-	-	-	-	-	O(1)	O(1)	O(1)	O	O	O	O(1)	O	12(4)	35(19)
Miho Fukumoto	19(0)	O	O	-	O	O	O	O	O	-	O	O	-	O	O	O	O	O	14(0)	33(0)
Maiko Nakaoka	13(0)	-	-	O	-	-	-	-	-	-	-	-	-	-	-	-	-	-	1(0)	14(0)
Azusa Iwashimizu	10(3)	O	O	-	O	O	-	-	-	O	O	O(1)	O	O	O(1)	O	O	O	13(2)	23(5)
Kanako Ito	9(2)	-	-	-	-	-	-	-	O(1)	-	-	-	-	-	-	-	-	-	1(1)	10(3)
Mizuho Sakaguchi	7(10)	-	-	O(2)	-	-	O	O	-	-	O	-	O(1)	-	-	-	-	-	5(3)	12(13)
Rumi Utsugi	7(0)	O	-	-	O	O	O	O	-	-	-	-	-	-	O	O	O	O	9(0)	16(0)
Ayako Kitamoto	6(3)	-	-	O	-	-	-	-	-	-	-	-	-	-	-	-	-	-	1(0)	7(3)
Nayuha Toyoda	5(0)	-	O	O	-	-	O	O	O	-	O	O	O	-	-	-	-	-	8(0)	13(0)
Yukari Kinga	3(0)	O	O	O	O	O	O	O	O	O	O	O	-	O	O	O	O	O	16(0)	19(0)
Mami Yamaguchi	0(0)	-	-	-	-	-	-	-	-	-	O	-	-	-	-	-	-	-	1(0)	1(0)

== 2008 ==
=== Results ===
2008.02.18	Japan	3–2	North Korea	China
	Ando (?); Miyama (?); Sawa (?)		? (?) ? (?)

2008.02.21	Japan	2–1	South Korea	China
	Arakawa (?); Ono (?)		? (?)

2008.02.24	Japan	3–0	China	China
	Ono (?); Nagasato (?)

2008.03.07	Japan	0–3	Canada	Cyprus
			? (?) ? (?) ? (?)

2008.03.10	Japan	3–1	Russia	Cyprus
	Sakaguchi (?); Ono (?); Utsugi (?)		? (?)

2008.03.12	Japan	2–1	Netherlands	Cyprus
	Nagasato (?); Utsugi (?)		? (?)

2008.05.29	Japan	1–3	South Korea	Vietnam
	Nagasato (?)		? (?) ? (?) ? (?)

2008.05.31	Japan	11–0	Chinese Taipei	Vietnam
	Sameshima (?); Utsugi (?); Ando (?); Arakawa (?); Maruyama (?); Goto (?); Kato (?); Nagasato (?)

2008.06.02	Japan	3–1	Australia	Vietnam
	Ando (?); Nagasato (?); Miyama (?)		? (?)

2008.06.05	Japan	1–3	China	Vietnam
	Sawa (?)		? (?) ? (?) ? (?)

2008.06.08	Japan	3–0	Australia	Vietnam
	Nagasato (?); Miyama (?); Sawa (?)

2008.07.24	Japan	3–0	Australia	Hyogo, Japan
	Sawa (?); Nagasato (?); Maruyama (?)			Stadium: Kobe Wing Stadium

2008.07.29	Japan	2–0	Argentina	Tokyo, Japan
	Ono (?); Nagasato (?)			Stadium: National Stadium

2008.08.06	Japan	2–2	New Zealand	China
	Miyama (?); Sawa (?)		? (?) ? (?)

2008.08.09	Japan	0–1	United States	China
			? (?)

2008.08.12	Japan	5–1	Norway	China
	Kinga (?) (?); Ono (?); Sawa (?); Hara (?)		? (?)

2008.08.15	Japan	2–0	China	China
	Sawa (?); Nagasato (?)

2008.08.18	Japan	2–4	United States	China
	Ono (?); Arakawa (?)		? (?) ? (?) ? (?) ? (?)

2008.08.21	Japan	0–2	Germany	China
			? (?) ? (?)

=== Players statistics ===
Player	−2007	02.18	02.21	02.24	03.07	03.10	03.12	05.29	05.31	06.02	06.05	06.08	07.24	07.29	08.06	08.09	08.12	08.15	08.18	08.21	2008	Total
Homare Sawa	130(65)	O(1)	O	O	-	-	-	O	-	O	O(1)	O(1)	O(1)	O	O(1)	O	O(1)	O(1)	O	O	15(7)	145(72)
Tomoe Kato	110(7)	-	O	-	-	-	-	-	O(1)	-	-	-	-	O	-	-	O	-	-	-	4(1)	114(8)
Hiromi Ikeda	107(4)	-	-	O	-	-	-	O	-	O	O	O	O	O	-	O	O	O	O	O	12(0)	119(4)
Nozomi Yamago	83(0)	-	O	O	-	-	-	O	-	-	-	-	-	-	-	-	-	-	-	-	3(0)	86(0)
Miyuki Yanagita	76(11)	O	O	O	O	O	O	O	-	O	O	O	O	O	O	O	-	O	-	-	15(0)	91(11)
Eriko Arakawa	54(17)	O	O(1)	O	-	-	-	O	O(1)	O	O	O	-	O	O	O	-	O	O(1)	O	14(3)	68(20)
Kozue Ando	52(7)	O(1)	O	O	O	-	O	O	O(1)	O(1)	-	O	O	O	O	O	O	O	O	-	16(3)	68(10)
Aya Miyama	50(15)	O(1)	O	O	O	O	O	O	-	O(1)	O	O(1)	O	O	O(1)	O	O	O	O	O	18(4)	68(19)
Shinobu Ono	46(18)	O	O(1)	O(2)	O	O(1)	O	O	O	O	O	O	O	O(1)	O	O	O(1)	O	O(1)	O	19(7)	65(25)
Karina Maruyama	41(10)	O	O	O	-	O	O	O	O(2)	-	O	O	O(1)	O	O	O	O	O	O	O	17(3)	58(13)
Kyoko Yano	41(1)	-	O	-	-	O	O	-	-	-	-	-	O	O	O	-	O	O	O	O	10(0)	51(1)
Yuki Nagasato	35(19)	O	-	O(1)	-	O	O(1)	O(1)	O(1)	O(1)	O	O(1)	O(1)	O(1)	O	O	O	O(1)	O	O	17(9)	52(28)
Ayumi Hara	34(1)	-	-	-	O	O	-	-	-	-	-	-	O	O	-	O	O(1)	-	O	O	8(1)	42(2)
Miho Fukumoto	33(0)	O	-	-	O	O	O	-	-	O	O	-	O	O	O	O	O	O	O	O	14(0)	47(0)
Mai Nakachi	29(0)	-	O	-	-	-	-	-	-	-	-	-	-	-	-	-	-	-	-	-	1(0)	30(0)
Aya Shimokozuru	27(0)	-	-	-	-	-	-	-	O	-	-	-	-	-	-	-	-	-	-	-	1(0)	28(0)
Azusa Iwashimizu	23(5)	O	O	O	O	O	O	O	-	O	O	O	O	O	O	O	O	O	O	O	18(0)	41(5)
Yukari Kinga	19(0)	O	O	O	O	O	O	O	-	O	O	O	O	O	O	O	O(1)	O	O	O	18(1)	37(1)
Rumi Utsugi	16(0)	-	-	O	O	O(1)	O(1)	-	O(2)	O	O	-	O	O	-	-	-	-	-	O	10(4)	26(4)
Mizuho Sakaguchi	12(13)	O	-	O	O	O(1)	O	O	-	O	O	O	O	O	O	O	O	O	O	O	17(1)	29(14)
Nayuha Toyoda	13(0)	O	O	-	O	-	O	-	-	-	-	-	-	-	-	-	-	-	-	-	4(0)	17(0)
Ayako Kitamoto	7(3)	-	-	-	-	-	-	-	O	-	O	-	-	-	-	-	-	-	-	-	2(0)	9(3)
Eriko Sato	1(0)	-	-	-	-	O	-	-	-	-	-	-	-	-	-	-	-	-	-	-	1(0)	2(0)
Ayumi Kaihori	0(0)	-	-	-	-	-	-	-	O	-	-	O	O	-	-	-	-	-	-	-	3(0)	3(0)
Michi Goto	0(0)	-	-	-	O	-	-	-	O(2)	-	-	-	-	-	-	-	-	-	-	-	2(2)	2(2)
Aya Sameshima	0(0)	-	-	-	-	O	-	-	O(1)	-	-	-	-	-	-	-	-	-	-	-	2(1)	2(1)
Saki Kumagai	0(0)	-	-	-	O	-	-	-	O	-	-	-	-	-	-	-	-	-	-	-	2(0)	2(0)
Nahomi Kawasumi	0(0)	-	-	-	-	-	-	-	O	-	-	-	-	-	-	-	-	-	-	-	1(0)	1(0)

== 2009 ==
=== Results ===
2009.07.29	Japan	0–0	Germany	Germany

2009.08.01	Japan	4–0	France	France
	Ono (?); Ando (?); Kinga (?); Yamaguchi (?)

2009.11.14	Japan	2–1	New Zealand	Saitama, Japan
	Miyama (?); Ono (?)		? (?)	Stadium: Saitama Komaba Stadium

=== Players statistics ===
Player	−2008	07.29	08.01	11.14	2009	Total
Homare Sawa	145(72)	-	-	O	1(0)	146(72)
Nozomi Yamago	86(0)	-	O	O	2(0)	88(0)
Eriko Arakawa	68(20)	-	-	O	1(0)	69(20)
Aya Miyama	68(19)	-	-	O(1)	1(1)	69(20)
Kozue Ando	68(10)	O	O(1)	O	3(1)	71(11)
Shinobu Ono	65(25)	O	O(1)	O(1)	3(2)	68(27)
Karina Maruyama	58(13)	O	O	-	2(0)	60(13)
Yuki Nagasato	52(28)	O	O	O	3(0)	55(28)
Kyoko Yano	51(1)	-	-	O	1(0)	52(1)
Azusa Iwashimizu	41(5)	O	O	O	3(0)	44(5)
Yukari Kinga	37(1)	O	O(1)	O	3(1)	40(2)
Rumi Utsugi	26(4)	O	O	O	3(0)	29(4)
Yuka Miyazaki	17(2)	-	O	-	1(0)	18(2)
Nayuha Toyoda	17(0)	O	O	-	2(0)	19(0)
Ayako Kitamoto	9(3)	O	O	O	3(0)	12(3)
Ayumi Kaihori	3(0)	O	O	O	3(0)	6(0)
Aya Sameshima	2(1)	O	O	O	3(0)	5(1)
Nahomi Kawasumi	1(0)	O	O	-	2(0)	3(0)
Mami Yamaguchi	1(0)	-	O(1)	-	1(1)	2(1)
Asano Nagasato	0(0)	O	O	O	3(0)	3(0)
Miwa Yonetsu	0(0)	O	-	O	2(0)	2(0)
Maiko Nasu	0(0)	-	O	O	2(0)	2(0)
Megumi Kamionobe	0(0)	-	O	-	1(0)	1(0)
