= Akiko Sudo =

Japanese footballer

Akiko Sudo 須藤 安紀子
Personal information
- Full name: Akiko Sudo
- Date of birth: 7 April 1984 (age 42)
- Place of birth: Kokubunji, Tokyo, Japan
- Height: 1.65 m (5 ft 5 in)
- Position: Defender

Senior career*
Years	Team	Apps	(Gls)
2000–2013	Nippon TV Beleza	156	(15)
Total		156	(15)

International career
2002	Japan U-20	4	(1)
2003–2010	Japan	15	(3)
Medal record
Nippon TV Beleza
Winner	Nadeshiko League	2000
Winner	Nadeshiko League	2001
Winner	Nadeshiko League	2002
Winner	Nadeshiko League	2005
Winner	Nadeshiko League	2006
Winner	Nadeshiko League	2007
Winner	Nadeshiko League	2008
Winner	Nadeshiko League	2010
Runner-up	Nadeshiko League	2003
Runner-up	Nadeshiko League	2004
Runner-up	Nadeshiko League	2009
Runner-up	Nadeshiko League	2011
Runner-up	Nadeshiko League	2012
Runner-up	Nadeshiko League	2013
Winner	Nadeshiko League Cup	2007
Winner	Nadeshiko League Cup	2010
Winner	Nadeshiko League Cup	2012
Winner	Empress's Cup	2000
Winner	Empress's Cup	2004
Winner	Empress's Cup	2005
Winner	Empress's Cup	2007
Winner	Empress's Cup	2008
Winner	Empress's Cup	2009
Runner-up	Empress's Cup	2002
Runner-up	Empress's Cup	2003
Representing Japan
AFC Women's Asian Cup
Bronze medal – third place	2010 China
Asian Games
Silver medal – second place	2006 Doha	Team
AFC U-19 Women's Championship
Gold medal – first place	2002 India
- * Club domestic league appearances and goals

Akiko Sudo (須藤 安紀子, Sudō Akiko; born 7 April 1984) is a former Japanese football player. She played for Japan national team.

== Club career ==
Sudo was born in Kokubunji on 7 April 1984. She was promoted to Nippon TV Beleza from youth team in 2000 and played until 2013. In 14 seasons, she played 156 games and scored 15 goals and the club won the L.League championship 8 times. At the end of the 2013 season, she retired.

== National team career ==
In August 2002, Sudo was selected Japan U-20 national team for 2002 U-19 World Championship. On 12 January 2003, she debuted for Japan national team against United States. She was a member of Japan for 2003 World Cup. She subsequently played the 2006 Asian Games, where she scored against Jordan, the 2010 EAFF Championship, which Japan won, and the 2010 Asian Cup, which marked qualification for the 2011 World Cup, which Japan eventually won. She played 15 games and scored 3 goals for Japan until 2010. She also played the 2003 and 2007 Summer Universiade.

== National team statistics ==
Japan national team
Year	Apps	Goals
2003	2	0
2004	0	0
2005	5	1
2006	1	1
2007	0	0
2008	0	0
2009	0	0
2010	7	1
Total	15	3

== International goals ==
No.	Date	Venue	Opponent	Score	Result	Competition
2.	30 November 2006	Grand Hamad Stadium, Doha, Qatar	Jordan	3–0	13–0	2006 Asian Games
