= Chiaki Minamiyama =

Japanese footballer

Chiaki Minamiyama 南山 千明
Personal information
- Full name: Chiaki Minamiyama
- Date of birth: October 16, 1985 (age 41)
- Place of birth: Ichikawa, Chiba, Japan
- Height: 1.65 m (5 ft 5 in)
- Position: Midfielder

Team information
- Current team: Orca Kamogawa FC
- Number: 27

Youth career
- 1998–2002: Nippon TV Beleza

Senior career*
Years	Team	Apps	(Gls)
2003–2010	Nippon TV Beleza	53	(6)
2011–2016	INAC Kobe Leonessa	80	(12)
2017–2018	Hwacheon KSPO		
2019–	Orca Kamogawa FC		
Total		133	(18)

International career
2010	Japan	4	(2)
Medal record
Nippon TV Beleza
Winner	Nadeshiko League	2005
Winner	Nadeshiko League	2006
Winner	Nadeshiko League	2007
Winner	Nadeshiko League	2008
Winner	Nadeshiko League	2010
Runner-up	Nadeshiko League	2003
Runner-up	Nadeshiko League	2004
Runner-up	Nadeshiko League	2009
Winner	Nadeshiko League Cup	2007
Winner	Nadeshiko League Cup	2010
Winner	Empress's Cup	2004
Winner	Empress's Cup	2005
Winner	Empress's Cup	2007
Winner	Empress's Cup	2008
Winner	Empress's Cup	2009
Runner-up	Empress's Cup	2003
INAC Kobe Leonessa
Winner	Nadeshiko League	2011
Winner	Nadeshiko League	2012
Winner	Nadeshiko League	2013
Runner-up	Nadeshiko League	2016
Winner	Nadeshiko League Cup	2013
Runner-up	Nadeshiko League Cup	2012
Winner	Empress's Cup	2011
Winner	Empress's Cup	2012
Winner	Empress's Cup	2013
Winner	Empress's Cup	2015
Winner	Empress's Cup	2016
Representing Japan
AFC Women's Asian Cup
Bronze medal – third place	2010 China
- * Club domestic league appearances and goals

Chiaki Minamiyama (南山 千明, Minamiyama Chiaki; born October 16, 1985) is a Japanese football player. She played for Japan national team.

== Club career ==
Minamiyama was born in Ichikawa on October 16, 1985. In 2003, she joined Nippon TV Beleza from youth team and played until 2010. In 2011, she moved to INAC Kobe Leonessa. She left the club end of 2016 season. In June 2017, she joined Korean WK League club Hwacheon KSPO. In 2019, she returned Japan and joined Orca Kamogawa FC.

== National team career ==
On May 8, 2010, Minamiyama debuted for Japan national team against Mexico. She played 4 games and scored 2 goals for Japan in 2010.

== National team statistics ==
Japan national team
Year	Apps	Goals
2010	4	2
Total	4	2
