= Nayuha Toyoda =

Japanese footballer

Nayuha Toyoda 豊田 奈夕葉
Personal information
- Full name: Nayuha Toyoda
- Date of birth: 15 September 1986 (age 40)
- Place of birth: Kamakura, Kanagawa, Japan
- Height: 1.65 m (5 ft 5 in)
- Position: Midfielder

Team information
- Current team: Laos women's (head coach)

Youth career
- Nippon TV Beleza

Senior career*
Years	Team	Apps	(Gls)
2003–2011	Nippon TV Beleza	134	(6)
2012	Speranza FC Osaka-Takatsuki	8	(0)
2012	Albirex Niigata	6	(0)
2013	Bunnys Kyoto SC	22	(6)
2014	Yokohama FC Seagulls		
Total		170+	(12+)

International career
2004–2010	Japan	22	(0)

Managerial career
- 2023-2025: Laos women's
Medal record
Nippon TV Beleza
Winner	Nadeshiko League	2005
Winner	Nadeshiko League	2006
Winner	Nadeshiko League	2007
Winner	Nadeshiko League	2008
Winner	Nadeshiko League	2010
Runner-up	Nadeshiko League	2003
Runner-up	Nadeshiko League	2004
Runner-up	Nadeshiko League	2009
Runner-up	Nadeshiko League	2011
Winner	Nadeshiko League Cup	2007
Winner	Nadeshiko League Cup	2010
Winner	Empress's Cup	2004
Winner	Empress's Cup	2005
Winner	Empress's Cup	2007
Winner	Empress's Cup	2008
Winner	Empress's Cup	2009
Runner-up	Empress's Cup	2003
Representing Japan
AFC Women's Asian Cup
Bronze medal – third place	2010 China
- * Club domestic league appearances and goals

Nayuha Toyoda (豊田 奈夕葉, Toyoda Nayuha; born 15 September 1986) is a former Japanese football player. She was most recently the head coach of the Laos women's national football team.

== Club career ==
Toyoda was born in Kamakura on 15 September 1986. She was promoted to Nippon TV Beleza from youth team in 2003. She retired in June 2011. In 2012, she came back at Speranza FC Osaka-Takatsuki. In October, she moved to Albirex Niigata. From 2013, she played for Bunnys Kyoto SC (2013) and Yokohama FC Seagulls (2014).

== National team career ==
On 18 December 2004, when Toyoda was 18 years old, she debuted for Japan national team against Chinese Taipei. She was a member of Japan for 2007 World Cup. She played 22 games for Japan until 2010.

== National team statistics ==
Japan national team
Year	Apps	Goals
2004	1	0
2005	4	0
2006	0	0
2007	8	0
2008	4	0
2009	2	0
2010	3	0
Total	22	0
