= Noriko Baba =

Japanese footballer (born 1977)

Noriko Baba 馬場 典子
Personal information
- Full name: Noriko Baba
- Date of birth: May 4, 1977 (age 49)
- Place of birth: Tokyo, Japan
- Height: 1.64 m (5 ft 4 1/2 in)
- Position: Defender

Senior career*
Years	Team	Apps	(Gls)
1994–2006	Nippon TV Beleza		

International career
2001–2002	Japan	5	(0)
Medal record
Nippon TV Beleza
Winner	Nadeshiko League	2000
Winner	Nadeshiko League	2001
Winner	Nadeshiko League	2002
Winner	Nadeshiko League	2005
Winner	Nadeshiko League	2006
Runner-up	Nadeshiko League	1994
Runner-up	Nadeshiko League	1997
Runner-up	Nadeshiko League	1998
Runner-up	Nadeshiko League	1999
Runner-up	Nadeshiko League	2003
Runner-up	Nadeshiko League	2004
Winner	Nadeshiko League Cup	1996
Winner	Nadeshiko League Cup	1999
Runner-up	Nadeshiko League Cup	1997
Winner	Empress's Cup	1997
Winner	Empress's Cup	2000
Winner	Empress's Cup	2004
Winner	Empress's Cup	2005
Runner-up	Empress's Cup	1996
Runner-up	Empress's Cup	2002
Runner-up	Empress's Cup	2003
- * Club domestic league appearances and goals

Noriko Baba (馬場 典子, Baba Noriko; born May 4, 1977) is a former Japanese football player. She played for Japan national team.

== Club career ==
Baba was born in Tokyo on May 4, 1977. She played for Nippon TV Beleza from 1994 to 2006.

== National team ==
On August 3, 2001, Baba debuted for Japan national team against South Korea. She played 5 games for Japan until 2002.

== National team statistics ==
Japan national team
Year	Apps	Goals
2001	4	0
2002	1	0
Total	5	0
