= Tomomi Fujimura =

Japanese footballer

Tomomi Fujimura 藤村 智美
Personal information
- Full name: Tomomi Fujimura
- Date of birth: May 30, 1978 (age 48)
- Place of birth: Hyogo, Japan
- Position: Defender

Senior career*
Years	Team	Apps	(Gls)
1997–2005	Iga FC Kunoichi		
2006–2009	INAC Kobe Leonessa		

International career
1997–2002	Japan	20	(1)
Medal record
Iga FC Kunoichi
Winner	Nadeshiko League	1999
Runner-up	Nadeshiko League	2000
Winner	Nadeshiko League Cup	1997
Winner	Nadeshiko League Cup	1998
Runner-up	Nadeshiko League Cup	1999
Winner	Empress's Cup	1998
Winner	Empress's Cup	2001
Runner-up	Empress's Cup	1997
Runner-up	Empress's Cup	1999
INAC Kobe Leonessa
Runner-up	Nadeshiko League	2008
Runner-up	Empress's Cup	2008
Representing Japan
AFC Women's Asian Cup
Silver medal – second place	2001 Chinese Taipei
- * Club domestic league appearances and goals

Tomomi Fujimura (藤村 智美, Fujimura Tomomi; born May 30, 1978) is a former Japanese football player. She played for the Japan national team.

== Club career ==
Fujimura was born in Hyogo Prefecture on May 30, 1978. After graduating from high school, she played for Iga FC Kunoichi (1997–2005) and INAC Kobe Leonessa (2006–2009). She was selected Best Eleven in 2000 season.

== National team career ==
On June 15, 1997, when Fujimura was 19 years old, she debuted for the Japan national team against China. She played at the 1999 and 2001 AFC Championship. She played 20 games and scored one goal for Japan until 2002.

== National team statistics ==
Japan national team
Year	Apps	Goals
1997	1	0
1998	0	0
1999	6	0
2000	6	0
2001	4	1
2002	3	0
Total	20	1
