= Asano Nagasato =

Japanese footballer

Asano Nagasato 永里 亜紗乃
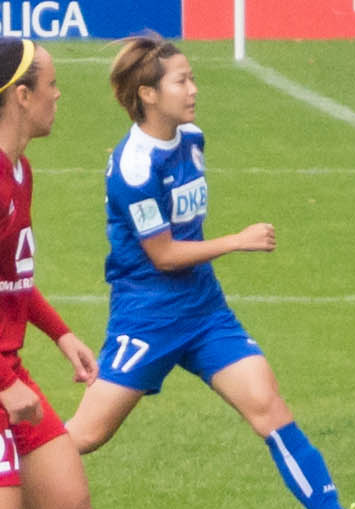

Personal information
- Full name: Asano Nagasato
- Date of birth: January 24, 1989 (age 37)
- Place of birth: Atsugi, Kanagawa, Japan
- Height: 1.65 m (5 ft 5 in)
- Position: Forward

Youth career
- 2004–2006: Nippon TV Beleza

Senior career*
| Years | Team | Apps | (Gls) |
| 2007–2012 | Nippon TV Beleza | 90 | (39) |
| 2013–2016 | Turbine Potsdam | 37 | (12) |
| Total | | 127 | (51) |

International career
| 2008 | Japan U-20 | 3 | (2) |
| 2009–2015 | Japan | 11 | (1) |
Medal record
Nippon TV Beleza
| Winner | Nadeshiko League | 2007 |
| Winner | Nadeshiko League | 2008 |
| Winner | Nadeshiko League | 2010 |
| Runner-up | Nadeshiko League | 2009 |
| Runner-up | Nadeshiko League | 2011 |
| Runner-up | Nadeshiko League | 2012 |
| Winner | Nadeshiko League Cup | 2007 |
| Winner | Nadeshiko League Cup | 2010 |
| Winner | Nadeshiko League Cup | 2012 |
| Winner | Empress's Cup | 2007 |
| Winner | Empress's Cup | 2008 |
| Winner | Empress's Cup | 2009 |
Representing Japan
FIFA Women's World Cup
| Silver medal – second place | 2015 Canada |
AFC U-19 Women's Championship
| Silver medal – second place | 2007 China |
AFC U-16 Women's Championship
| Gold medal – first place | 2005 South Korea |
- * Club domestic league appearances and goals

Asano Nagasato (永里 亜紗乃, Nagasato Asano; born January 24, 1989) is a Japanese former footballer, who played as a forward. She played for the Japan national team. Her brother Genki Nagasato and sister Yuki Nagasato are also footballers.

== Club career ==
Nagasato was born in Atsugi on January 24, 1989. She joined Nippon TV Beleza from youth team in 2007. In 2012 season, she was selected Best Eleven. In 2013, she moved to German Bundesliga club Turbine Potsdam. In 2016, she retired.

== National team career ==
In November 2008, Nagasato was selected Japan U-20 national team for 2008 U-20 World Cup. She scored two goals including a winner against Germany. On July 29, 2009, Asano Nagasato debuted for Japan national team against Germany. She was a member of Japan for 2015 World Cup. She played 11 games and scored 1 goals for Japan until 2015.

== National team statistics ==
Japan national team
| Year | Apps | Goals |
|---|---|---|
| 2009 | 3 | 0 |
| 2010 | 0 | 0 |
| 2011 | 1 | 0 |
| 2012 | 0 | 0 |
| 2013 | 2 | 0 |
| 2014 | 1 | 1 |
| 2015 | 4 | 0 |
| Total | 11 | 1 |
