= Ayako Kitamoto =

Japanese footballer and manager

Ayako Kitamoto 北本 綾子
Personal information
- Full name: Ayako Kitamoto
- Date of birth: June 22, 1983 (age 43)
- Place of birth: Sapporo, Hokkaido, Japan
- Height: 1.64 m (5 ft 4 1/2 in)
- Position: Forward

Youth career
- 1999–2001: Hokkaido Bunkyo University Meisei High School
- 2002–2003: Tokyo Women's College of Physical Education

Senior career*
Years	Team	Apps	(Gls)
2004–2010	Urawa Reds	118	(58)
2014–2015	Orca Kamogawa FC		
Total		118	(58)

International career
2002	Japan U-20	3	(0)
2004–2010	Japan	17	(4)

Managerial career
- 2014–2017: Orca Kamogawa FC
Medal record
Urawa Reds
Winner	Nadeshiko League	2004
Winner	Nadeshiko League	2009
Runner-up	Nadeshiko League	2006
Runner-up	Nadeshiko League	2010
Runner-up	Nadeshiko League Cup	2007
Runner-up	Nadeshiko League Cup	2010
Runner-up	Empress's Cup	2004
Runner-up	Empress's Cup	2009
Runner-up	Empress's Cup	2010
Representing Japan
AFC Women's Asian Cup
Bronze medal – third place	2008 Vietnam
Asian Games
Gold medal – first place	2010 Guangzhou	Team
AFC U-19 Women's Championship
Gold medal – first place	2002 India
- * Club domestic league appearances and goals

Ayako Kitamoto (北本 綾子, Kitamoto Ayako; born June 22, 1983) is a former Japanese football player and manager. She played for Japan national team.

== Club career ==
Kitamoto was born in Sapporo on June 22, 1983. After graduating from Tokyo Women's College of Physical Education, she played for the Urawa Reds from 2004 to 2010. She was selected for the Best Eleven in 2009. She retired at the end of the 2010 season. In 2014, she came back as playing manager at a new club, the Orca Kamogawa FC. She stayed with the team until the 2015 season.

== National team career ==
In August 2002, Kitamoto was selected for the Japan U-20 national team for the 2002 U-19 World Championship. On June 6, 2004, she debuted for the Japan national team against the United States. She played 17 games and scored 4 goals for Japan until 2010.

== Coaching career ==
In 2014, Kitamoto became playing manager for new club Orca Kamogawa FC. She retired as player in 2015 and she resigned as manager in 2017.

== National team statistics ==
Japan national team
Year	Apps	Goals
2004	2	3
2005	4	0
2006	0	0
2007	1	0
2008	2	0
2009	3	0
2010	5	1
Total	17	4

== International goals ==
No.	Date	Venue	Opponent	Score	Result	Competition
4.	14 November 2010	Huangpu Sports Center, Guangzhou, China	Thailand	1–0	4–0	2010 Asian Games
