= Tomomi Miyamoto =

Japanese footballer (born 1978)

Tomomi Miyamoto 宮本 ともみ
Personal information
- Full name: Tomomi Miyamoto
- Date of birth: December 31, 1978 (age 47)
- Place of birth: Sagamihara, Kanagawa, Japan
- Height: 1.68 m (5 ft 6 in)
- Position: Midfielder

Youth career
- 1994–1996: Sagami-Ono High School

Senior career*
Years	Team	Apps	(Gls)
1997–2004	Iga FC Kunoichi	104	(8)
2006–2008	Iga FC Kunoichi	52	(4)
2009–2010	TEPCO Mareeze	38	(7)
2011–2012	Iga FC Kunoichi	34	(3)
Total		228	(22)

International career
1997–2007	Japan	77	(13)
Medal record
Iga FC Kunoichi
Winner	Nadeshiko League	1999
Runner-up	Nadeshiko League	2000
Winner	Nadeshiko League Cup	1997
Winner	Nadeshiko League Cup	1998
Runner-up	Nadeshiko League Cup	1999
Winner	Empress's Cup	1998
Winner	Empress's Cup	2001
Runner-up	Empress's Cup	1997
Runner-up	Empress's Cup	1999
Representing Japan
AFC Women's Asian Cup
Bronze medal – third place	1997 China
Asian Games
Bronze medal – third place	1998 Bangkok	Team
Bronze medal – third place	2002 Busan	Team
- * Club domestic league appearances and goals

Tomomi Miyamoto (宮本 ともみ, Miyamoto Tomomi; born December 31, 1978) (former name; Tomomi Mitsui, 三井 ともみ) is a former Japanese football player. She played for Japan national team.

== Club career ==
Miyamoto was born in Sagamihara on December 31, 1978. After graduating from high school, she joined Prima Ham FC Kunoichi (later Iga FC Kunoichi) in 1997. She was selected Best Eleven 2 times (1999 and 2003). She took maternity leave in 2005 season. She came back from 2006 season. In 2009, she moved to TEPCO Mareeze. In 2011, she returned to Iga FC Kunoichi. End of 2012 season, she retired.

== National team career ==
On June 8, 1997, when Miyamoto was 18 years old, she debuted and scored a goal for Japan national team against China. She was a member of Japan for 1999, 2003, 2007 World Cup and 2004 Summer Olympics. She also played at 1997, 1999, 2003 AFC Championship, 1998 and 2002 Asian Games. She played 77 games and scored 13 goals for Japan until 2007.

== Personal life ==
Miyamoto got married and changed her name to Tomomi Miyamoto (宮本 ともみ) from Tomomi Mitsui (三井 ともみ) in 2002. In May 2005, she bore a children. So, she took maternity leave in 2005 season.

== National team statistics ==
Japan national team
Year	Apps	Goals
1997	6	2
1998	10	1
1999	14	2
2000	0	0
2001	0	0
2002	7	1
2003	14	3
2004	9	2
2005	0	0
2006	1	0
2007	16	2
Total	77	13

== International goals ==
No.	Date	Venue	Opponent	Score	Result	Competition
1.	8 June 1997	Japan National Stadium, Tokyo, Japan	China	1–0	1–0	Friendly
2.	9 December 1997	Guangzhou, China	Hong Kong	?–0	9–0	1997 AFC Women's Championship
3.	8 December 1998	Thupatemi Stadium, Pathum Thani, Thailand	Thailand	?–0	6–0	1998 Asian Games
4.	12 November 1999	Barotac Nuevo, Philippines	Nepal	?–0	14–0	1999 AFC Women's Championship
5.	12 November 1999	Barotac Nuevo, Philippines	Nepal	?–0	14–0	1999 AFC Women's Championship
6.	9 October 2002	Changwon Stadium, Changwon, South Korea	China	1–0	2–2	2002 Asian Games
7.	9 June 2003	Rajamangala Stadium, Bangkok, Thailand	Philippines	11–0	15–0	2003 AFC Women's Championship
8.	5 July 2003	Mexico	Mexico	?–?	2–2	Friendly
9.	22 July 2003	Sendai Stadium, Sendai, Japan	South Korea	?–0	5–0	Friendly
10.	18 April 2004	Komazawa Olympic Park Stadium, Tokyo, Japan	Vietnam	1–0	7–0	2004 Summer Olympics qualification
11.	18 April 2004	Komazawa Olympic Park Stadium, Tokyo, Japan	Vietnam	3–0	7–0	2004 Summer Olympics qualification
12.	3 June 2007	Japan National Stadium, Tokyo, Japan	South Korea	1–0	6–1	2008 Summer Olympics qualification
13.	4 August 2007	Lạch Tray Stadium, Hải Phòng, Vietnam	Vietnam	5–0	8–0	2008 Summer Olympics qualification
