= Yuka Yamazaki =

Japanese footballer

Yuka Yamazaki 山崎 由加
Personal information
- Full name: Yuka Yamazaki
- Date of birth: June 29, 1980 (age 46)
- Place of birth: Tokyo, Japan
- Height: 1.66 m (5 ft 5 1/2 in)
- Position: Defender

Senior career*
Years	Team	Apps	(Gls)
1995–2002	Nippon TV Beleza		
2003–2006	Okayama Yunogo Belle		

International career
2000–2001	Japan	7	(0)
Medal record
Nippon TV Beleza
Winner	Nadeshiko League	2000
Winner	Nadeshiko League	2001
Winner	Nadeshiko League	2002
Runner-up	Nadeshiko League	1997
Runner-up	Nadeshiko League	1998
Runner-up	Nadeshiko League	1999
Winner	Nadeshiko League Cup	1996
Winner	Nadeshiko League Cup	1999
Runner-up	Nadeshiko League Cup	1997
Winner	Empress's Cup	1997
Winner	Empress's Cup	2000
Runner-up	Empress's Cup	1996
Runner-up	Empress's Cup	2002
Okayama Yunogo Belle
Runner-up	Empress's Cup	2006
- * Club domestic league appearances and goals

Yuka Yamazaki (山崎 由加, Yamazaki Yuka; born June 29, 1980) is a former Japanese football player. She played for Japan national team.

== Club career ==
Yamazaki was born in Tokyo on June 29, 1980. She played for Nippon TV Beleza and Okayama Yunogo Belle. She retired in 2006.

== National team career ==
On May 31, 2000, when Yamazaki was 19 years old, she debuted for Japan national team against Australia. She played 7 games for Japan until 2001.

== National team statistics ==
Japan national team
Year	Apps	Goals
2000	6	0
2001	1	0
Total	7	0
