= Yasuyo Yamagishi =

Japanese footballer

Yasuyo Yamagishi 山岸 靖代
Personal information
- Full name: Yasuyo Yamagishi
- Date of birth: 28 November 1979 (age 46)
- Place of birth: Saitama, Japan
- Height: 1.63 m (5 ft 4 in)
- Position: Defender

Youth career
- 1995–1997: Saitama Sakae High School

Senior career*
| Years | Team | Apps | (Gls) |
| 1998–2006 | Iga FC Kunoichi | 131 | (27) |
| 2007–2008 | INAC Leonessa | | |

International career
| 1998–2005 | Japan | 60 | (6) |
Medal record
Iga FC Kunoichi
| Winner | Nadeshiko League | 1999 |
| Runner-up | Nadeshiko League | 2000 |
| Winner | Nadeshiko League Cup | 1998 |
| Runner-up | Nadeshiko League Cup | 1999 |
| Winner | Empress's Cup | 1998 |
| Winner | Empress's Cup | 2001 |
| Runner-up | Empress's Cup | 1999 |
INAC Leonessa
| Runner-up | Nadeshiko League | 2008 |
| Runner-up | Empress's Cup | 2008 |
Representing Japan
AFC Women's Asian Cup
| Silver medal – second place | 2001 Chinese Taipei |
Asian Games
| Bronze medal – third place | 1998 Bangkok | Team |
| Bronze medal – third place | 2002 Busan | Team |
- * Club domestic league appearances and goals

Yasuyo Yamagishi (山岸 靖代, Yamagishi Yasuyo; born 28 November 1979) is a former Japanese football player. She played for Japan national team.

== Club career ==
Yamagishi was born in Saitama Prefecture on 28 November 1979. After graduating from high school, she joined Prima Ham FC Kunoichi (later Iga FC Kunoichi) in 1998. She played 131 matches in L.League and she was selected Best Eleven 5 times (1999, 2001, 2002, 2003 and 2004). In 2007, she moved to INAC Leonessa. She retired at the end of the 2008 season.

== National team career ==
In December 1998, when Yamagishi was 19 years old, she was selected Japan national team for 1998 Asian Games. At this competition, on 8 December, she debuted against Thailand. She played at 1999, 2001, 2003 AFC Championship and 2002 Asian Games. She was also a member of Japan for 2003 World Cup and 2004 Summer Olympics. She played 60 games and scored 6 goals for Japan until 2005.

== National team statistics ==
Japan national team
| Year | Apps | Goals |
|---|---|---|
| 1998 | 4 | 1 |
| 1999 | 5 | 3 |
| 2000 | 5 | 1 |
| 2001 | 11 | 0 |
| 2002 | 11 | 0 |
| 2003 | 12 | 1 |
| 2004 | 10 | 0 |
| 2005 | 2 | 0 |
| Total | 60 | 6 |
