= Ayumi Hara =

Japanese footballer (born 1979)

Ayumi Hara 原 歩
Personal information
- Full name: Ayumi Hara
- Date of birth: February 21, 1979 (age 47)
- Place of birth: Hachioji, Tokyo, Japan
- Height: 1.66 m (5 ft 5 1/2 in)
- Position: Midfielder

Senior career*
| Years | Team | Apps | (Gls) |
| 1993–2001 | Nippon TV Beleza | 108 | (24) |
| 2002–2005 | Iga FC Kunoichi | 61 | (20) |
| 2006–2009 | INAC Kobe Leonessa | 76 | (21) |
| 2013–2014 | AS Elfen Saitama | 0 | (0) |
| Total | | 245 | (65) |

International career
| 1998–2008 | Japan | 42 | (2) |
Medal record
Nippon TV Beleza
| Winner | Nadeshiko League | 1993 |
| Winner | Nadeshiko League | 2000 |
| Winner | Nadeshiko League | 2001 |
| Runner-up | Nadeshiko League | 1994 |
| Runner-up | Nadeshiko League | 1997 |
| Runner-up | Nadeshiko League | 1998 |
| Runner-up | Nadeshiko League | 1999 |
| Winner | Nadeshiko League Cup | 1996 |
| Winner | Nadeshiko League Cup | 1999 |
| Runner-up | Nadeshiko League Cup | 1997 |
| Winner | Empress's Cup | 1993 |
| Winner | Empress's Cup | 1997 |
| Winner | Empress's Cup | 2000 |
| Runner-up | Empress's Cup | 1996 |
INAC Kobe Leonessa
| Runner-up | Nadeshiko League | 2008 |
| Runner-up | Empress's Cup | 2008 |
- * Club domestic league appearances and goals

Ayumi Hara (原 歩, Hara Ayumi; born February 21, 1979) is a former Japanese football player. She played for Japan national team.

== Club career ==
Hara was born in Hachioji on February 21, 1979. In 1993, when she was 14 years old, she debuted for Yomiuri Nippon Beleza (later Nippon TV Beleza). In 2000 season, she was selected MVP awards in L.League. She played for the club until 2001. From 2002, she played for Iga FC Kunoichi (2002-2005) and INAC Kobe Leonessa (2006-2009). She retired in 2009. She played 245 matches at 3 clubs in L.League and she was selected Best Eleven 3 times (1999, 2000 and 2008). In July 2013, she came back at AS Elfen Sayama FC (later AS Elfen Saitama) until end of 2014 season.

== National team career ==
On May 17, 1998, when Hara was 18 years old, she debuted for Japan national team against United States. She was a member of Japan for 1999, 2007 World Cup and 2008 Summer Olympics. She played 42 games and scored 2 goals for Japan until 2008.

== National team statistics ==
Japan national team
| Year | Apps | Goals |
|---|---|---|
| 1998 | 3 | 0 |
| 1999 | 12 | 1 |
| 2000 | 6 | 0 |
| 2001 | 4 | 0 |
| 2002 | 2 | 0 |
| 2003 | 0 | 0 |
| 2004 | 1 | 0 |
| 2005 | 1 | 0 |
| 2006 | 0 | 0 |
| 2007 | 5 | 0 |
| 2008 | 8 | 1 |
| Total | 42 | 2 |

== International goals ==
| No. | Date | Venue | Opponent | Score | Result | Competition |
|---|---|---|---|---|---|---|
| 1. | 14 November 1999 | Iloilo Sports Complex, Iloilo City, Philippines | Philippines | 5–0 | 6–0 | 1999 AFC Women's Championship |
| 2. | 12 August 2008 | Shanghai Stadium, Shanghai, China | Norway | 5–1 | 5–1 | 2008 Summer Olympics |
