= Yuka Miyazaki (footballer) =

Japanese footballer

Yuka Miyazaki 宮﨑 有香
Personal information
- Full name: Yuka Miyazaki
- Date of birth: October 13, 1983 (age 43)
- Place of birth: Iga, Mie, Japan
- Height: 1.66 m (5 ft 5 1/2 in)
- Position: Defender

Senior career*
Years	Team	Apps	(Gls)
1999–2005	Iga FC Kunoichi	80	(3)
2006–2009	TEPCO Mareeze		
2013	Okayama Yunogo Belle	17	(2)
Total		97+	(5+)

International career
2002	Japan U-20	4	(0)
2001–2009	Japan	18	(2)
Medal record
Iga FC Kunoichi
Winner	Nadeshiko League	1999
Runner-up	Nadeshiko League	2000
Runner-up	Nadeshiko League Cup	1999
Winner	Empress's Cup	2001
Runner-up	Empress's Cup	1999
Okayama Yunogo Belle
Runner-up	Nadeshiko League Cup	2013
Representing Japan
AFC Women's Asian Cup
Silver medal – second place	2001 Chinese Taipei
Asian Games
Bronze medal – third place	2002 Busan	Team
AFC U-19 Women's Championship
Gold medal – first place	2002 India
- * Club domestic league appearances and goals

Yuka Miyazaki (宮﨑 有香, Miyazaki Yuka; born October 13, 1983) is a former Japanese football player. She played for Japan national team.

== Club career ==
Miyazaki was born in Iga on October 13, 1983. when she was a high school and Tenri University student, she played for her local club Iga FC Kunoichi from 1999 to 2005. she was selected Best Eleven in 2002. After graduating from Tenri University, she joined TEPCO Mareeze in 2006. She left the club in 2009. In 2013, she came back at Okayama Yunogo Belle.

== National team career ==
On August 5, 2001, when Miyazaki was 17 years old, she debuted for Japan national team against China. In 2002, she was selected Japan U-20 national team for 2002 U-19 World Championship. She was also a member of Japan for 2003 World Cup. She played 18 games and scored 2 goals for Japan until 2009.

== National team statistics ==
Japan national team
Year	Apps	Goals
2001	5	0
2002	5	1
2003	6	1
2004	1	0
2005	0	0
2006	0	0
2007	0	0
2008	0	0
2009	1	0
Total	18	2

== International goals ==
No.	Date	Venue	Opponent	Score	Result	Competition
1.	11 October 2002	Masan Stadium, Changwon, South Korea	Chinese Taipei	1–0	2–0	2002 Asian Games
2.	9 June 2003	Rajamangala Stadium, Bangkok, Thailand	Philippines	6–0	15–0	2003 AFC Women's Championship
