= Mito Isaka =

Japanese footballer

Mito Isaka 井坂 美都
Personal information
- Full name: Mito Isaka
- Date of birth: January 25, 1976 (age 50)
- Place of birth: Saitama, Japan
- Height: 1.56 m (5 ft 1 1/2 in)
- Position: Forward

Senior career*
Years	Team	Apps	(Gls)
1994	Urawa Ladies		
1995–????	Iga FC Kunoichi		

International career
1997–2002	Japan	46	(15)
Medal record
Iga FC Kunoichi
Winner	Nadeshiko League	1995
Winner	Nadeshiko League	1999
Runner-up	Nadeshiko League	1996
Runner-up	Nadeshiko League	2000
Winner	Nadeshiko League Cup	1997
Winner	Nadeshiko League Cup	1998
Runner-up	Nadeshiko League Cup	1996
Runner-up	Nadeshiko League Cup	1999
Winner	Empress's Cup	1995
Winner	Empress's Cup	1998
Winner	Empress's Cup	2001
Runner-up	Empress's Cup	1997
Runner-up	Empress's Cup	1999
Representing Japan
AFC Women's Asian Cup
Silver medal – second place	2001 Chinese Taipei
Asian Games
Bronze medal – third place	1998 Bangkok	Team
Bronze medal – third place	2002 Busan	Team
- * Club domestic league appearances and goals

Mito Isaka (井坂 美都, Isaka Mito; born January 25, 1976) is a former Japanese football player. She played for Japan national team.

== Club career ==
Isaka was born in Saitama Prefecture on January 25, 1976. She joined L.League club Urawa Ladies in 1994. She was selected Best Young Player awards in 1994 season. In 1995, she moved to Prima Ham FC Kunoichi (later Iga FC Kunoichi). In 1999 season, she scored 21 goals and became top scorer and she was selected MVP awards. She was also selected Best Eleven 3 times (1999, 2000 and 2003).

== National team career ==
On June 15, 1997, Isaka debuted for Japan national team against China. She played at 1998, 2002 Asian Games, 1999 and 2001 AFC Championship. She was also a member of Japan for 1999 World Cup. She played 46 games and scored 15 goals for Japan until 2002.

== National team statistics ==
Japan national team
Year	Apps	Goals
1997	1	0
1998	6	3
1999	14	5
2000	5	0
2001	11	7
2002	9	0
Total	46	15
