= Kyoko Yano =

Japanese footballer

Kyoko Yano 矢野 喬子
Personal information
- Full name: Kyoko Yano
- Date of birth: June 3, 1984 (age 42)
- Place of birth: Yokohama, Kanagawa, Japan
- Height: 1.64 m (5 ft 4 1/2 in)
- Position: Defender

Youth career
- 2000–2002: Shonan Gakuin High School
- 2003–2006: Kanagawa University

Senior career*
Years	Team	Apps	(Gls)
2007–2012	Urawa Reds	111	(3)
Total		111	(3)

International career
2003–2012	Japan	74	(1)
Medal record
Urawa Reds
Winner	Nadeshiko League	2009
Runner-up	Nadeshiko League	2010
Runner-up	Nadeshiko League Cup	2007
Runner-up	Nadeshiko League Cup	2010
Runner-up	Empress's Cup	2009
Runner-up	Empress's Cup	2010
Representing Japan
Olympic Games
Silver medal – second place	2012 London	Team
FIFA Women's World Cup
Gold medal – first place	2011 Germany
AFC Women's Asian Cup
Bronze medal – third place	2010 China
Asian Games
Gold medal – first place	2010 Guangzhou	Team
Silver medal – second place	2006 Doha	Team
- * Club domestic league appearances and goals

Kyoko Yano (矢野 喬子, Yano Kyōko; born June 3, 1984) is a Japanese former football player. She has played for the Japan national team as a defender.

== Club career ==
Yano was born in Yokohama on June 3, 1984. After graduating from Kanagawa University, she joined Urawa Reds in 2007. In 2007 season, she was selected Best Young Player awards. She retired end of 2012 season. In 6 seasons, she played 111 matches in L.League and she was selected Best Eleven every season.

== National team career ==
In June 2003, Yano was a Kanagawa University student, she was selected to play for the Japan national team at the 2003 AFC Championship. At this competition, on June 11, she debuted and scored a goal against Guam. She played at the World Cup 3 times (2003, 2007 and 2011) and at the Summer Olympics 3 times (2004, 2008 and 2012). Japan won the championship at the 2011 World Cup and silver medal at the 2012 Summer Olympics. She played 74 games and scored 1 goals for Japan until 2012.

== Club statistics ==
Club	Season	League		Cup		League Cup		Total	
Club	Season	Apps	Goals	Apps	Goals	Apps	Goals	Apps	Goals
Urawa Reds	2007	21	2	3	0	2	0	26	2
Urawa Reds	2008	21	0	2	0	-		23	0
Urawa Reds	2009	21	0	4	0	-		25	0
Urawa Reds	2010	18	0	4	0	6	0	28	0
Urawa Reds	2011	13	0	2	0	-		15	0
Urawa Reds	2012	17	1	3	0	4	0	24	1
Career total		111	3	18	0	12	0	141	3

== National team statistics ==
Japan national team
Year	Apps	Goals
2003	9	1
2004	5	0
2005	5	0
2006	16	0
2007	6	0
2008	10	0
2009	1	0
2010	13	0
2011	4	0
2012	5	0
Total	74	1

International goals
#	Date	Venue	Opponent	Score	Result	Competition
1.	11 June 2003	Rajamangala Stadium, Bangkok, Thailand	Guam	6–0	7-0	2003 AFC Women's Championship

== Honors ==
=== Club Team ===
- L.League

Champion (1): 2009

=== National team ===
- FIFA Women's World Cup

Champion (1): 2011

- Asian Games

Gold Medal (1): 2010

- East Asian Football Championship

Champions (2): 2008, 2010
