= Maiko Nakaoka =

Japanese footballer

Maiko Nakaoka 中岡 麻衣子
Personal information
- Full name: Maiko Nakaoka
- Date of birth: February 15, 1985 (age 41)
- Place of birth: Amagasaki, Hyogo, Japan
- Height: 1.64 m (5 ft 4 1/2 in)
- Position: Midfielder

Youth career
- 2000–2002: Honjo Daiichi High School

Senior career*
Years	Team	Apps	(Gls)
1997–1999	Takarazuka Bunnys	5	(0)
2003–2008	Tasaki Perule FC	56	(1)
2009–2011	Speranza FC Takatsuki		
2012	Albirex Niigata	2	(0)
Total		63+	(1+)

International career
2005–2007	Japan	14	(0)
Medal record
Tasaki Perule FC
Winner	Nadeshiko League	2003
Runner-up	Nadeshiko League	2005
Runner-up	Nadeshiko League	2007
Winner	Empress's Cup	2003
Winner	Empress's Cup	2006
Runner-up	Empress's Cup	2005
Runner-up	Empress's Cup	2007
Representing Japan
Asian Games
Silver medal – second place	2006 Doha	Team
- * Club domestic league appearances and goals

Maiko Nakaoka (中岡 麻衣子, Nakaoka Maiko; born February 15, 1985) is a former Japanese football player. She played for Japan national team.

== Club career ==
Nakaoka was born in Amagasaki on February 15, 1985. In 1997, she was 12 years old, she debuted in L.League at Takarazuka Bunnys. While she was a high school student, she left the league. After graduating from high school, she joined Tasaki Perule FC in 2003. However, the club was disbanded in 2008 due to financial strain. She moved to Speranza FC Takatsuki. In 2012, she moved to Albirex Niigata and retired end of season.

== National team career ==
On May 21, 2005, when Nakaoka was 20 years old, she debuted for Japan national team against New Zealand. In 2006, she played at 2006 Asian Cup and 2006 Asian Games. She played 14 games for Japan until 2007.

== National team statistics ==
Japan national team
Year	Apps	Goals
2005	3	0
2006	10	0
2007	1	0
Total	14	0
