= 1999 L.League Cup final =

NTV Beleza	Prima Ham FC Kunoichi
1	0
- Date: June 13, 1999
- Venue: Nihondaira Sports Stadium, Shizuoka

1999 L.League Cup final was the fourth final of the L. League Cup competition. The final was played at Nihondaira Sports Stadium in Shizuoka on June 13, 1999. NTV Beleza won the championship.

== Overview ==
NTV Beleza won their second title, by defeating defending champion Prima Ham FC Kunoichi, 1–0.

== Match details ==
June 13, 1999

NTV Beleza	1-0	Prima Ham FC Kunoichi
? ?'

Nihondaira Sports Stadium

== See also ==
- 1999 L.League Cup
