= Harue Sato =

Japanese footballer

Harue Sato 佐藤 春詠
Personal information
- Full name: Harue Sato
- Date of birth: January 1, 1976 (age 50)
- Place of birth: Isesaki, Gunma, Japan
- Height: 1.70 m (5 ft 7 in)
- Position: Forward

Senior career*
Years	Team	Apps	(Gls)
1994–1998	Nikko Securities Dream Ladies	22	(2)
1999	OKI FC Winds	14	(2)
2000–2006	TEPCO Mareeze	109	(44)
Total		145	(48)

International career
2000–2002	Japan	17	(4)
Medal record
Nikko Securities Dream Ladies
Winner	Nadeshiko League	1996
Winner	Nadeshiko League	1997
Winner	Nadeshiko League	1998
Runner-up	Nadeshiko League	1995
Winner	Empress's Cup	1996
Runner-up	Empress's Cup	1994
Runner-up	Empress's Cup	1998
Representing Japan
AFC Women's Asian Cup
Silver medal – second place	2001 Chinese Taipei
- * Club domestic league appearances and goals

Harue Sato (佐藤 春詠, Satō Harue; born January 1, 1976) is a former Japanese football player. She played for Japan national team.

== Club career ==
Sato was born in Isesaki on January 1, 1976. After graduating from high school, she joined Nikko Securities Dream Ladies in 1994. The club was disbanded in 1998 due to financial strain. She moved to OKI FC Winds in 1999. However, the club was disbanded end of season. She moved to YKK Tohoku Ladies SC Flappers (later TEPCO Mareeze) in 2000. In 2000 season, she was selected Best Eleven. She retired in 2006.

== National team career ==
On May 31, 2000, Sato debuted for Japan national team against Australia. She played at 2001 AFC Championship. She played 17 games and scored 4 goals for Japan until 2002.

== National team statistics ==
Japan national team
Year	Apps	Goals
2000	4	1
2001	9	3
2002	4	0
Total	17	4
