= Nakaoka =

Nakaoka (written: 中岡) is a Japanese surname. Notable people with the surname include:

- Maiko Nakaoka (中岡 麻衣子, born 1985), Japanese women's footballer
- Nakaoka Shintarō (中岡 慎太郎, 1838–1867), Japanese samurai
