= 1997 L.League Cup final =

Prima Ham FC Kunoichi	Yomiuri-Seiyu Beleza
3	0
- Date: May 11, 1997
- Venue: Nihondaira Sports Stadium, Shizuoka

1997 L.League Cup final was the second final of the L.League Cup competition. The final was played at Nihondaira Sports Stadium in Shizuoka on May 11, 1997. Prima Ham FC Kunoichi won the championship.

== Overview ==
Prima Ham FC Kunoichi won their 1st title, by defeating defending champion Yomiuri-Seiyu Beleza 3–0.

== Match details ==
May 11, 1997

Prima Ham FC Kunoichi	3-0	Yomiuri-Seiyu Beleza
? ?' ? ?' ? ?'

Nihondaira Sports Stadium

== See also ==
- 1997 L.League Cup
