= Aya Shimokozuru =

Japanese footballer

Aya Shimokozuru 下小鶴 綾
Personal information
- Full name: Aya Shimokozuru
- Date of birth: 7 June 1982 (age 44)
- Place of birth: Nagaokakyo, Kyoto, Japan
- Height: 1.68 m (5 ft 6 in)
- Position: Defender

Youth career
- Matsushita Electric Panasonic Bambina

Senior career*
Years	Team	Apps	(Gls)
1999–2004	Speranza FC Takatsuki	63	(5)
2005–2008	Tasaki Perule FC	77	(4)
2009	Speranza FC Takatsuki	14	(1)
2010–2011	TEPCO Mareeze	18	(3)
2012–2013	Vegalta Sendai	35	(7)
Total		207	(20)

International career
2004–2008	Japan	28	(0)
Medal record
Representing Japan
AFC Women's Asian Cup
Bronze medal – third place	2008 Vietnam
Asian Games
Silver medal – second place	2006 Doha	Team
- * Club domestic league appearances and goals

Aya Shimokozuru (下小鶴 綾, Shimokozuru Aya; born 7 June 1982) is a former Japanese football player. She played for Japan national team.

== Club career ==
Shimokozuru was born in Nagaokakyo on 7 June 1982. In 1999, she joined Matsushita Electric Panasonic Bambina (later Speranza FC Takatsuki) from youth team. In 2005, she graduated from Kansai University and moved to Tasaki Perule FC. She was selected Best Eleven in 2005, 2006. However, in 2008, the club was disbanded due to financial strain and she retired. In May 2009, she came back at Speranza FC Takatsuki. In 2010, she moved to TEPCO Mareeze. However, the club was disbanded for Fukushima Daiichi nuclear disaster in 2011. She moved to new club Vegalta Sendai and played as captain. She retired end of 2013 season.

== National team career ==
In April 2004, Shimokozuru was selected Japan national team for 2004 Summer Olympics qualification. At this competition, on 18 April, she debuted against Vietnam. She was a member of Japan for 2004 Summer Olympics. She also played at 2006, 2008 Asian Cup and 2006 Asian Games. She played 28 games for Japan until 2008.

== National team statistics ==
Japan national team
Year	Apps	Goals
2004	10	0
2005	5	0
2006	11	0
2007	1	0
2008	1	0
Total	28	0
