= Megumi Torigoe =

Japanese footballer

Megumi Torigoe 鳥越 恵
Personal information
- Full name: Megumi Torigoe
- Date of birth: April 28, 1976 (age 50)
- Place of birth: Japan
- Position: Defender

Senior career*
Years	Team	Apps	(Gls)
- Speranza FC Takatsuki

International career
1999–2001	Japan	8	(0)
- * Club domestic league appearances and goals

Megumi Torigoe (鳥越 恵, Torigoe Megumi; born April 28, 1976) is a former Japanese football player. She played for Japan national team.

== Club career ==
Torigoe played for Speranza FC Takatsuki.

== National team career ==
In November 1999, Torigoe was selected Japan national team for 1999 AFC Championship. At this competition, on November 8, she debuted against Thailand. She played 8 games for Japan until 2001.

== National team statistics ==
Japan national team
Year	Apps	Goals
1999	5	0
2000	2	0
2001	1	0
Total	8	0
