= Rie Kimura =

Japanese footballer

Rie Kimura 木村 理恵
Personal information
- Full name: Rie Kimura
- Date of birth: July 30, 1971 (age 55)
- Place of birth: Kyoto, Japan
- Position: Defender

Youth career
- 1990–1993: Osaka University of Health and Sport Sciences

Senior career*
Years	Team	Apps	(Gls)
1994–2003	Speranza FC Takatsuki		

International career
1996–2001	Japan	21	(0)
Medal record
Speranza FC Takatsuki
Winner	Nadeshiko League	1994
Runner-up	Nadeshiko League Cup	1998
Representing Japan
AFC Women's Asian Cup
Silver medal – second place	2001 Chinese Taipei
- * Club domestic league appearances and goals

Rie Kimura (木村 理恵, Kimura Rie; born July 30, 1971) is a former Japanese football player. She played for Japan national team.

== Club career ==
Kimura was born in Kyoto Prefecture on July 30, 1971. After graduating from Osaka University of Health and Sport Sciences, she played for Speranza FC Takatsuki from 1994 to 2003.

== National team career ==
On May 16, 1996, Kimura debuted for Japan national team against United States. She played at 1999 and 2001 AFC Championship. She played 21 games for Japan until 2001.

== National team statistics ==
Japan national team
Year	Apps	Goals
1996	2	0
1997	0	0
1998	0	0
1999	6	0
2000	6	0
2001	7	0
Total	21	0
