= Yoshie Kasajima =

Japanese footballer

Yoshie Kasajima 笠嶋 由恵
Personal information
- Full name: Yoshie Kasajima
- Date of birth: May 12, 1975 (age 51)
- Place of birth: Japan
- Height: 1.70 m (5 ft 7 in)
- Position: Defender

Senior career*
| Years | Team | Apps | (Gls) |
- Shimizudaihachi SC
- Urawa Reds
- AS Elfen Sayama FC

International career
| 1999–2002 | Japan | 24 | (4) |
Medal record
Representing Japan
AFC Women's Asian Cup
| Silver medal – second place | 2001 Chinese Taipei |
Asian Games
| Bronze medal – third place | 2002 Busan | Team |
- * Club domestic league appearances and goals

Yoshie Kasajima (笠嶋 由恵, Kasajima Yoshie; born May 12, 1975) is a former Japanese football player. She played for Japan national team.

== Club career ==
Kasajima was born on May 12, 1975. She played for Shimizudaihachi SC, Urawa Reds and AS Elfen Sayama FC. She was selected Best Eleven in 2004 season. She retired end of 2011 season.

== National team career ==
In November 1999, Kasajima was selected Japan national team for 1999 AFC Championship. At this competition, on November 8, she debuted against Thailand. She also played at 2001 AFC Championship and 2002 Asian Games. She played 24 games and scored 4 goals for Japan until 2002.

== National team statistics ==
Japan national team
| Year | Apps | Goals |
|---|---|---|
| 1999 | 5 | 1 |
| 2000 | 5 | 0 |
| 2001 | 9 | 2 |
| 2002 | 5 | 1 |
| Total | 24 | 4 |
