= 2006 Nadeshiko League =

Nadeshiko.League
- Season: 2006
- Champions: Nippon TV Beleza; 9th L. League title
- Relegated: Speranza FC Takatsuki; TEPCO Mareeze
- Top goalscorer: Yuki Nagasato (18 goals)

Statistics of Nadeshiko.League in the 2006 season. Nippon TV Beleza won the championship.

== Division 1 ==
=== First stage ===
Pos	Team	Pld	W	D	L	GF	GA	GD	Pts	Qualification
1	Nippon TV Beleza	14	11	2	1	49	11	+38	35	2nd Stage:1-4 Playoff
2	Urawa Reds Ladies	14	10	2	2	26	13	+13	32	2nd Stage:1-4 Playoff
3	Tasaki Perule FC	14	9	3	2	28	14	+14	30	2nd Stage:1-4 Playoff
4	Okayama Yunogo Belle	14	7	2	5	17	17	0	23	2nd Stage:1-4 Playoff
5	Iga FC Kunoichi	14	4	1	9	9	28	−19	13	2nd Stage:5-8 Playoff
6	Speranza FC Takatsuki	14	2	3	9	16	30	−14	9	2nd Stage:5-8 Playoff
7	TEPCO Mareeze	14	1	5	8	12	27	−15	8	2nd Stage:5-8 Playoff
8	INAC Leonessa	14	1	4	9	16	33	−17	7	2nd Stage:5-8 Playoff

=== Second stage ===
==== Championship playoff ====
Pos	Team	Pld	W	D	L	GF	GA	GD	Pts	Qualification
1	Nippon TV Beleza	17	14	2	1	57	11	+46	44	Champions
2	Urawa Reds Ladies	17	12	2	3	28	16	+12	38	
3	Tasaki Perule FC	17	10	3	4	31	19	+12	33	
4	Okayama Yunogo Belle	17	7	2	8	18	23	−5	23	

Source: RSSSF

==== Position playoff ====
Pos	Team	Pld	W	D	L	GF	GA	GD	Pts	Qualification or relegation
5	INAC Leonessa	17	4	4	9	25	37	−12	16	
6	Iga FC Kunoichi	17	5	1	11	12	31	−19	16	
7	Speranza FC Takatsuki	17	3	4	10	19	33	−14	13	Division 1 promotion/relegation Series
8	TEPCO Mareeze	17	1	6	10	13	33	−20	9	Relegated to Division 2

Source: RSSSF

=== League awards ===
==== Best player ====
Player	Club
(Japan) Homare Sawa	Nippon TV Beleza

==== Top scorers ====
Rank	Scorer	Club	Goals
1	(Japan) Yuki Nagasato	Nippon TV Beleza	18

==== Best eleven ====
Pos	Player	Club
GK	(Japan) Miho Fukumoto	Okayama Yunogo Belle
DF	(Japan) Mai Nakachi	Nippon TV Beleza
DF	(Japan) Aya Shimokozuru	Tasaki Perule FC
DF	(Japan) Azusa Iwashimizu	Nippon TV Beleza
DF	(Japan) Hiromi Isozaki	Tasaki Perule FC
MF	(Japan) Homare Sawa	Nippon TV Beleza
MF	(Japan) Miyuki Yanagita	Urawa Reds Ladies
MF	(Japan) Tomoe Sakai	Nippon TV Beleza
FW	(Japan) Yuki Nagasato	Nippon TV Beleza
FW	(Japan) Shinobu Ono	Nippon TV Beleza
FW	(Japan) Mio Otani	Tasaki Perule FC

==== Best young player ====
Player	Club
(Japan) Noriko Matsuda	Urawa Reds Ladies

== Division 2 ==
=== Result ===
Pos	Team	Pld	W	D	L	GF	GA	GD	Pts	Promotion or qualification
1	Albirex Niigata Ladies	21	16	3	2	83	14	+69	51	Promoted for Division 1
2	Ohara Gakuen JaSRA LSC	21	15	6	0	68	10	+58	51	Division 1 promotion/relegation Series
3	Fukuoka J. Anclas	21	13	2	6	68	31	+37	41	
4	JEF United Chiba Ladies	21	13	2	6	57	29	+28	41	
5	AS Elfen Sayama FC	21	9	3	9	34	51	−17	30	
6	Bunnys Kyoto SC	21	5	1	15	33	52	−19	16	
7	Shimizudaihachi SC	21	1	3	17	19	73	−54	6	
8	Renaissance Kumamoto FC	21	1	2	18	6	108	−102	5	

Source: RSSSF
- Best Player: Hiromi Katagiri, Albirex Niigata Ladies

== Promotion/relegation series ==
=== Division 1 promotion/relegation series ===
2006-11-11
13:00

Speranza FC Takatsuki	1–2	Ohara Gakuen JaSRA LSC

Edogawa Stadium
- Ohara Gakuen JaSRA LSC was promoted to Division 1 in the 2007 season.
- Speranza FC Takatsuki was relegated to Division 2 in the 2007 season.

== See also ==
- Empress's Cup
