= 2009 Empress's Cup =

Tournament details
- Country: Japan

Final positions
- Champions: Nippon TV Beleza
- Runners-up: Urawa Reds
- Semifinalists: INAC Kobe Leonessa; TEPCO Mareeze

Statistics of Empress's Cup in the 2009 season.

== Overview ==
It was contested by 32 teams, and Nippon TV Beleza won the championship.

== Results ==
=== 1st round ===
- Hinomoto Gakuen High School 3-7 Waseda University
- Je Vrille Kagoshima 1-4 Tokiwagi Gakuken High School
- AS Elfen Sayama FC 11-0 Oita Trinita
- Bunnys Kyoto SC 1-6 Kanagawa University
- Shimizudaihachi Pleiades 5-0 ASC Adooma
- Iga FC Kunoichi 2-0 Osaka Toin High School
- JFA Academy Fukushima 7-1 Renaissance Kumamoto FC
- Ehime Women's College 0-3 Fukuoka J. Anclas

=== 2nd round ===
- Ohara Gakuen JaSRA 1-1 (pen 4-3) Waseda University
- Tokiwagi Gakuken High School 3-1 Fujieda Junshin High School
- Nippon TV Menina 0-1 AS Elfen Sayama FC
- Kanagawa University 2-0 Tokoha University Tachibana High School
- Sakuyo High School 3-1 Shimizudaihachi Pleiades
- Iga FC Kunoichi 1-0 Kibi International University
- Kamimura Gakuen High School 1-5 JFA Academy Fukushima
- Fukuoka J. Anclas 1-0 Fukui University of Technology Fukui High School

=== 3rd round ===
- Urawa Reds 4-0 Ohara Gakuen JaSRA
- Tokiwagi Gakuken High School 0-2 JEF United Chiba
- Speranza FC Takatsuki 1-3 AS Elfen Sayama FC
- Kanagawa University 0-2 INAC Kobe Leonessa
- TEPCO Mareeze 8-0 Sakuyo High School
- Iga FC Kunoichi 0-2 Albirex Niigata
- Okayama Yunogo Belle 4-0 JFA Academy Fukushima
- Fukuoka J. Anclas 0-5 Nippon TV Beleza

=== Quarterfinals ===
- Urawa Reds 2-0 JEF United Chiba
- AS Elfen Sayama FC 0-2 INAC Kobe Leonessa
- TEPCO Mareeze 1-0 Albirex Niigata
- Okayama Yunogo Belle 1-5 Nippon TV Beleza

=== Semifinals ===
- Urawa Reds 3-2 INAC Kobe Leonessa
- TEPCO Mareeze 1-2 Nippon TV Beleza

=== Final ===
- Nippon TV Beleza 2-0 Urawa Reds

Nippon TV Beleza won the championship.
