= 2004 Empress's Cup =

Tournament details
- Country: Japan

Final positions
- Champions: Nippon TV Beleza
- Runners-up: Saitama Reinas FC
- Semifinalists: Iga FC Kunoichi Mie; Tasaki Perule FC

Statistics of Empress's Cup in the 2004 season.

== Overview ==
It was contested by 24 teams, and Nippon TV Beleza won the championship.

== Results ==
=== 1st round ===
- Hokkaido Bunkyo University Meisei High School 5-1 Toyama Ladies SC
- Okayama Yunogo Belle 3-1 Tokyo Women's College of Physical Education
- Renaissance Kumamoto FC 1-0 Bucchigiri FC
- JEF United Ichihara 0-3 Hoo High School
- Nagoya FC 4-6 Shimizudaihachi SC
- AS Elfen Sayama FC 1-6 Kanagawa University
- Albirex Niigata 9-0 Hiroshima Fujita SC
- INAC Leonessa 3-2 Tokiwagi Gakuken High School

=== 2nd round ===
- Saitama Reinas FC 6-0 Hokkaido Bunkyo University Meisei High School
- Okayama Yunogo Belle 3-1 Ohara Gakuen JaSRA
- YKK AP Tohoku LSC Flappers 5-0 Renaissance Kumamoto FC
- Hoo High School 0-5 Iga FC Kunoichi
- Tasaki Perule FC 13-0 Shimizudaihachi SC
- Kanagawa University 0-1 Takarazuka Bunnys
- Speranza FC Takatsuki 1-2 Albirex Niigata
- INAC Leonessa 1-3 Nippon TV Beleza

=== Quarterfinals ===
- Saitama Reinas FC 6-1 Okayama Yunogo Belle
- YKK AP Tohoku LSC Flappers 0-0 (pen 3–4) Iga FC Kunoichi
- Tasaki Perule FC 5-0 Takarazuka Bunnys
- Albirex Niigata 0-5 Nippon TV Beleza

=== Semifinals ===
- Saitama Reinas FC 1-1 (pen 4–3) Iga FC Kunoichi
- Tasaki Perule FC 1-3 Nippon TV Beleza

=== Final ===
- Saitama Reinas FC 1-3 Nippon TV Beleza

Nippon TV Beleza won the championship.
