= 2005 Empress's Cup =

Tournament details
- Country: Japan

Final positions
- Champions: Nippon TV Beleza
- Runners-up: Tasaki Perule FC
- Semifinalists: Urawa Reds; Okayama Yunogo Belle

Statistics of Empress's Cup in the 2005 season.

== Overview ==
It was contested by 32 teams, and Nippon TV Beleza won the championship.

== Results ==
=== 1st round ===
- Nippon TV Beleza 7-0 Kamimura Gakuen High School
- Seiwa Gakuen High School 0-2 Waseda University
- INAC Leonessa 10-0 Hokkaido Bunkyo University Meisei High School
- Hinomoto Gakuen High School 1-1 (pen 5–3) Takarazuka Bunnys
- Urawa Reds 13-0 Toyama Ladies SC
- Iga FC Fraulein 0-3 AS Elfen Sayama FC
- JEF United Chiba 3-0 Hiroshima Fujita SC
- Musashigaoka College 0-1 TEPCO Mareeze
- Iga FC Kunoichi 3-2 Tokiwagi Gakuken High School
- Nagoya FC 2-1 Shimizudaihachi SC
- Ohara Gakuen JaSRA 1-0 Fukuoka Jogakuin FC Anclas
- Urawa Motobuto 0-3 Okayama Yunogo Belle
- Speranza FC Takatsuki 1-0 Osaka University of Health and Sport Sciences
- Kanagawa University 1-5 Albirex Niigata
- Renaissance Kumamoto FC 1-2 Kibi International University
- Kochi JFC Rosa 0-8 Tasaki Perule FC

=== 2nd round ===
- Nippon TV Beleza 5-0 Waseda University
- INAC Leonessa 6-0 Hinomoto Gakuen High School
- Urawa Reds 5-0 AS Elfen Sayama FC
- JEF United Chiba 0-4 TEPCO Mareeze
- Iga FC Kunoichi 4-0 Nagoya FC
- Ohara Gakuen JaSRA 0-2 Okayama Yunogo Belle
- Speranza FC Takatsuki 3-0 Albirex Niigata
- Kibi International University 0-8 Tasaki Perule FC

=== Quarterfinals ===
- Nippon TV Beleza 8-0 INAC Leonessa
- Urawa Reds 1-0 TEPCO Mareeze
- Iga FC Kunoichi 1-4 Okayama Yunogo Belle
- Speranza FC Takatsuki 2-3 Tasaki Perule FC

=== Semifinals ===
- Nippon TV Beleza 2-0 Urawa Reds
- Okayama Yunogo Belle 0-4 Tasaki Perule FC

=== Final ===
- Nippon TV Beleza 4-1 Tasaki Perule FC

Nippon TV Beleza won the championship.
