= 1999 L.League =

L. League
- Season: 1999
- Champions: Prima Ham FC Kunoichi; 2nd L. League title
- Relegated: Nippon Sport Science University
- Top goalscorer: Mito Isaka (21 goals)

Statistics of L. League in the 1999 season. Prima Ham FC Kunoichi won the championship.

== First stage ==
Pos	Team	Pld	W	D	L	GF	GA	GD	Pts	Qualification
1	Prima Ham FC Kunoichi	7	5	1	1	37	3	+34	16	Champions
2	Tasaki Perule FC	7	5	1	1	18	4	+14	16	
3	NTV Beleza	7	5	0	2	32	9	+23	15	
4	Matsushita Electric Panasonic Bambina	7	4	1	2	20	7	+13	13	
5	OKI FC Winds	7	4	1	2	14	11	+3	13	
6	Takarazuka Bunnys Ladies SC	7	2	0	5	11	19	−8	6	
7	Nippon Sport Science University	7	1	0	6	5	47	−42	3	
8	Urawa Reinas FC	7	0	0	7	2	40	−38	0	

== Second stage ==
Pos	Team	Pld	W	D	L	GF	GA	GD	Pts	Qualification
1	NTV Beleza	7	5	2	0	20	4	+16	17	Champions
2	Tasaki Perule FC	7	5	1	1	16	5	+11	16	
3	Prima Ham FC Kunoichi	7	5	0	2	22	6	+16	15	
4	OKI FC Winds	7	4	1	2	19	7	+12	13	
5	Matsushita Electric Panasonic Bambina	7	3	0	4	17	9	+8	9	
6	Takarazuka Bunnys Ladies SC	7	3	0	4	10	9	+1	9	
7	Urawa Reinas FC	7	1	0	6	6	26	−20	3	
8	Nippon Sport Science University	7	0	0	7	3	47	−44	0	

== Championship Playoff ==
Prima Ham FC Kunoichi 3 - 1 NTV Beleza

- Prima Ham FC Kunoichi won the championship.

== League standings ==
Pos	Team	Pld	W	D	L	GF	GA	GD	Pts	Qualification
1	Prima Ham FC Kunoichi	14	10	1	3	59	9	+50	31	Season Champions
2	NTV Beleza	14	10	2	2	52	13	+39	32	
3	Tasaki Perule FC	14	10	2	2	34	9	+25	32	
4	OKI FC Winds	14	8	2	4	33	18	+15	26	Dissolved
5	Matsushita Electric Panasonic Bambina	14	7	1	6	37	15	+22	22	
6	Takarazuka Bunnys Ladies SC	14	5	0	9	21	28	−7	15	
7	Urawa Reinas FC	14	1	0	13	8	66	−58	3	
8	Nippon Sport Science University	14	1	0	13	8	94	−86	3	Moved to Regional League

Source: RSSSF

== League awards ==
=== Best player ===
Player	Club
(Japan) Mito Isaka	Prima Ham FC Kunoichi

=== Top scorers ===
Rank	Scorer	Club	Goals
1	(Japan) Mito Isaka	Prima Ham FC Kunoichi	21

=== Best eleven ===
Pos	Player	Club
GK	(Japan) Nozomi Yamago	Urawa Reinas FC
DF	(Japan) Tomoe Sakai	NTV Beleza
DF	(Japan) Yumi Tomei	Prima Ham FC Kunoichi
DF	(Japan) Yasuyo Yamagishi	Prima Ham FC Kunoichi
DF	(Japan) Hiromi Isozaki	Tasaki Perule FC
MF	(Japan) Tomomi Mitsui	Prima Ham FC Kunoichi
MF	(Japan) Tamaki Uchiyama	Prima Ham FC Kunoichi
MF	(Japan) Ayumi Hara	NTV Beleza
FW	(Japan) Nami Otake	NTV Beleza
FW	(Japan) Miyuki Izumi	NTV Beleza
FW	(Japan) Mito Isaka	Prima Ham FC Kunoichi

=== Best young player ===
Player	Club
(Japan) Mai Aizawa	Matsushita Electric Panasonic Bambina

== See also ==
- Empress's Cup
