= 2007 Empress's Cup =

Tournament details
- Country: Japan

Final positions
- Champions: Nippon TV Beleza
- Runners-up: Tasaki Perule FC
- Semifinalists: INAC Leonessa; Urawa Reds

Statistics of Empress's Cup in the 2007 season.

== Overview ==
It was contested by 32 teams, and Nippon TV Beleza won the championship.

== Results ==
=== 1st round ===
- Briosita Akita 2006 0-1 Kibi International University
- Kochi Ganador FC 0-7 Nippon Sport Science University
- Iga FC Fraulein 0-8 JEF United Chiba
- Nippon TV Menina 8-0 Fukui University of Technology Fukui High School
- Shimizudaihachi Pleiades 4-0 Hiroshima Bunkyo Women's University High School
- Fujieda Junshin High School 0-1 Hoo High School
- Osaka University of Health and Sport Sciences 0-1 TEPCO Mareeze
- Renaissance Kumamoto FC 0-1 Hinomoto Gakuen High School

=== 2nd round ===
- Fukuoka J. Anclas 0-0 (pen 0-3) Kibi International University
- Nippon Sport Science University 1-1 (pen 3-5) Speranza FC Takatsuki
- Bunnys Kyoto SC 1-2 JEF United Chiba
- Nippon TV Menina 11-0 Kagoshima Kamoike FC Asahina
- Tokiwagi Gakuken High School 3-2 Shimizudaihachi Pleiades
- Hoo High School 0-1 AS Elfen Sayama FC
- Hokkaido Bunkyo University Meisei High School 0-2 TEPCO Mareeze
- Hinomoto Gakuen High School 2-3 Urawa Reds Junior Youth

=== 3rd round ===
- Tasaki Perule FC 1-0 Kibi International University
- Speranza FC Takatsuki 2-1 Iga FC Kunoichi
- INAC Leonessa 4-1 JEF United Chiba
- Nippon TV Menina 0-4 Okayama Yunogo Belle
- Urawa Reds 3-1 Tokiwagi Gakuken High School
- AS Elfen Sayama FC 1-2 Ohara Gakuen JaSRA
- Albirex Niigata 1-0 TEPCO Mareeze
- Urawa Reds Junior Youth 0-3 Nippon TV Beleza

=== Quarterfinals ===
- Tasaki Perule FC 2-0 Speranza FC Takatsuki
- INAC Leonessa 2-0 Okayama Yunogo Belle
- Urawa Reds 4-0 Ohara Gakuen JaSRA
- Albirex Niigata 0-9 Nippon TV Beleza

=== Semifinals ===
- Tasaki Perule FC 2-1 INAC Leonessa
- Urawa Reds 0-3 Nippon TV Beleza

=== Final ===
- Tasaki Perule FC 0-2 Nippon TV Beleza

Nippon TV Beleza won the championship.
