= 2004 Nadeshiko League =

L. League
- Season: 2004
- Champions: Saitama Reinas FC; 1st L. League title
- Relegated: Ohara Gakuen JaSRA LSC
- Top goalscorer: Kozue Ando (12 goals)

Statistics of L. League in the 2004 season. Saitama Reinas FC won the championship.

== Division 1 ==
=== Result ===
Pos	Team	Pld	W	D	L	GF	GA	GD	Pts	Qualification or relegation
1	Saitama Reinas FC	14	11	3	0	35	8	+27	36	Champions
2	Nippon TV Beleza	14	11	2	1	41	2	+39	35	
3	Tasaki Perule FC	14	9	1	4	33	9	+24	28	
4	Iga FC Kunoichi	14	8	1	5	26	16	+10	25	
5	YKK AP Tohoku LSC Flappers	14	3	3	8	13	21	−8	12	
6	Takarazuka Bunnys Ladies SC	14	4	0	10	9	45	−36	12	
7	Speranza FC Takatsuki	14	3	2	9	12	26	−14	11	
8	Ohara Gakuen JaSRA LSC	14	0	2	12	4	46	−42	2	Relegated to Division 2

Source: RSSSF

=== League awards ===
==== Best player ====
Player	Club
(Japan) Kozue Ando	Saitama Reinas FC

==== Top scorers ====
Rank	Scorer	Club	Goals
1	(Japan) Kozue Ando	Saitama Reinas FC	12

==== Best eleven ====
Pos	Player	Club
GK	(Japan) Nozomi Yamago	Saitama Reinas FC
DF	(Japan) Yoshie Kasajima	Saitama Reinas FC
DF	(Japan) Kumiko Tashiro	Saitama Reinas FC
DF	(Japan) Yasuyo Yamagishi	Iga FC Kunoichi
DF	(Japan) Hiromi Isozaki	Tasaki Perule FC
MF	(Japan) Naoko Kawakami	Tasaki Perule FC
MF	(Japan) Kozue Ando	Saitama Reinas FC
MF	(Japan) Tomoe Sakai	Nippon TV Beleza
MF	(Japan) Saiko Takahashi	Saitama Reinas FC
FW	(Japan) Eriko Arakawa	Nippon TV Beleza
FW	(Japan) Mio Otani	Tasaki Perule FC

==== Best young player ====
Player	Club
(Japan) Natsuki Muraoka	Iga FC Kunoichi

== Division 2 ==
=== Result ===
Pos	Team	Pld	W	D	L	GF	GA	GD	Pts	Promotion
1	Okayama Yunogo Belle	15	14	0	1	69	7	+62	42	Promoted for Division 1
2	Albirex Niigata Ladies	15	12	0	3	61	17	+44	36	
3	AS Elfen Sayama FC	15	8	1	6	35	24	+11	25	
4	Renaissance Kumamoto FC	15	4	2	9	16	42	−26	14	
5	JEF United Ichihara Ladies	15	4	0	11	21	57	−36	12	
6	Shimizudaihachi SC	15	1	1	13	11	66	−55	4	

Source: RSSSF
- Best Player: Aya Miyama, Okayama Yunogo Belle

== See also ==
- Empress's Cup
