= 2007 Nadeshiko League =

Nadeshiko.League
- Season: 2007
- Champions: Nippon TV Beleza; 10th L. League title
- Relegated: Ohara Gakuen JaSRA LSC
- Top goalscorer: Shinobu Ono (23 goals)

Statistics of Nadeshiko.League in the 2007 season. Nippon TV Beleza won the championship.

== Division 1 ==
=== Result ===
Pos	Team	Pld	W	D	L	GF	GA	GD	Pts	Qualification or relegation
1	Nippon TV Beleza	21	17	2	2	73	12	+61	53	Champions
2	Tasaki Perule FC	21	17	1	3	43	22	+21	52	
3	Urawa Reds Ladies	21	15	3	3	50	18	+32	48	
4	INAC Leonessa	21	10	1	10	37	35	+2	31	
5	Okayama Yunogo Belle	21	9	2	10	37	33	+4	29	
6	Albirex Niigata Ladies	21	3	3	15	20	50	−30	12	
7	Iga FC Kunoichi	21	3	2	16	18	59	−41	11	Division 1 promotion/relegation Series
8	Ohara Gakuen JaSRA LSC	21	2	2	17	14	63	−49	8	Relegated to Division 2

Source: RSSSF

=== League awards ===
==== Best player ====
Player	Club
(Japan) Shinobu Ono	Nippon TV Beleza

==== Top scorers ====
Rank	Scorer	Club	Goals
1	(Japan) Shinobu Ono	Nippon TV Beleza	23

==== Best eleven ====
Pos	Player	Club
GK	(Japan) Nozomi Yamago	Urawa Reds Ladies
DF	(Japan) Yukari Kinga	Nippon TV Beleza
DF	(Japan) Kyoko Yano	Urawa Reds Ladies
DF	(Japan) Azusa Iwashimizu	Nippon TV Beleza
DF	(Japan) Hiromi Isozaki	Tasaki Perule FC
MF	(Japan) Homare Sawa	Nippon TV Beleza
MF	(Japan) Aya Miyama	Okayama Yunogo Belle
MF	(Japan) Tomoe Sakai	Nippon TV Beleza
FW	(Japan) Shinobu Ohno	Nippon TV Beleza
FW	(Japan) Kozue Ando	Urawa Reds Ladies
FW	(Japan) Mizuho Sakaguchi	Tasaki Perule FC

==== Best young player ====
Player	Club
(Japan) Kyoko Yano	Urawa Reds Ladies

== Division 2 ==
=== Result ===
Pos	Team	Pld	W	D	L	GF	GA	GD	Pts	Promotion or qualification
1	TEPCO Mareeze	21	18	2	1	76	6	+70	56	Promoted for Division 1
2	JEF United Chiba Ladies	21	14	3	4	68	19	+49	45	Division 1 promotion/relegation Series
3	Fukuoka J. Anclas	21	12	3	6	32	17	+15	39	
4	Speranza FC Takatsuki	21	11	2	8	44	18	+26	35	
5	AS Elfen Sayama FC	21	10	3	8	63	45	+18	33	
6	Bunnys Kyoto SC	21	7	3	11	39	46	−7	24	
7	Shimizudaihachi Pleiades	21	2	2	17	14	66	−52	8	
8	Renaissance Kumamoto FC	21	0	2	19	9	128	−119	2	

- Best Player: Aya Sameshima, TEPCO Mareeze

== Promotion/relegation series ==
=== Division 1 promotion/relegation series ===
2007-12-15
12:00

Iga FC Kunoichi	2 – 2 (a.e.t.)	JEF United Chiba Ladies
Penalties
	5 – 4

Tama, Tokyo
- Iga FC Kunoichi would stay in Division 1 for the 2008 season.
- JEF United Chiba Ladies would stay in Division 2 for the 2008 season.

== See also ==
- Empress's Cup
