= 2000 L.League =

L. League
- Season: 2000
- Champions: Nippon TV Beleza; 5th L. League title
- Top goalscorer: Yayoi Kobayashi (4 goals)

Statistics of L. League in the 2000 season. Nippon TV Beleza won the championship.

== First stage ==
=== East ===
Pos	Team	Pld	W	D	L	GF	GA	GD	Pts	Qualification
1	Nippon TV Beleza	6	5	1	0	25	1	+24	16	2nd Stage:1-4 Playoff
2	YKK Tohoku LSC Flappers	6	3	2	1	22	6	+16	11	2nd Stage:1-4 Playoff
3	Urawa Reinas FC	6	1	2	3	4	13	−9	5	2nd Stage:5-9 Playoff
4	JEF United Ichihara Ladies	6	0	1	5	2	33	−31	1	2nd Stage:5-9 Playoff

Source: RSSSF

=== West ===
Pos	Team	Pld	W	D	L	GF	GA	GD	Pts	Qualification
1	Tasaki Perule FC	8	7	0	1	51	6	+45	21	2nd Stage:1-4 Playoff
2	Iga FC Kunoichi	8	6	1	1	43	5	+38	19	2nd Stage:1-4 Playoff
3	Speranza FC Takatsuki	8	3	2	3	49	36	+13	11	2nd Stage:5-9 Playoff
4	Takarazuka Bunnys Ladies SC	8	2	1	5	9	23	−14	7	2nd Stage:5-9 Playoff
5	Renaissance Kumamoto FC	8	0	0	8	1	83	−82	0	2nd Stage:5-9 Playoff

Source: RSSSF

== Second stage ==
=== Championship playoff ===
Pos	Team	Pld	W	D	L	GF	GA	GD	Pts	Qualification
1	Nippon TV Beleza	6	4	2	0	9	3	+6	14	Champions
2	Iga FC Kunoichi	6	2	2	2	9	8	+1	8	
3	Tasaki Perule FC	6	0	4	2	7	10	−3	4	
4	YKK Tohoku LSC Flappers	6	0	4	2	5	9	−4	4	

Source: RSSSF

=== Position playoff ===
Pos	Team	Pld	W	D	L	GF	GA	GD	Pts
5	Speranza FC Takatsuki	4	4	0	0	19	3	+16	12
6	Urawa Reinas FC	4	3	0	1	20	3	+17	9
7	Takarazuka Bunnys Ladies SC	4	2	0	2	10	9	+1	6
8	JEF United Ichihara Ladies	4	1	0	3	3	14	−11	3
9	Renaissance Kumamoto FC	4	0	0	4	0	23	−23	0

Source: RSSSF

== League awards ==
=== Best player ===
Player	Club
(Japan) Ayumi Hara	Nippon TV Beleza

=== Top scorers ===
Rank	Scorer	Club	Goals
1	(Japan) Yayoi Kobayashi	Nippon TV Beleza	4

=== Best eleven ===
Pos	Player	Club
GK	(Japan) Shiho Onodera	Nippon TV Beleza
DF	(Japan) Mai Nakachi	Nippon TV Beleza
DF	(Japan) Yumi Obe	YKK Tohoku LSC Flappers
DF	(Japan) Tomomi Fujimura	Iga FC Kunoichi
DF	(Japan) Hiromi Isozaki	Tasaki Perule FC
MF	(Japan) Yayoi Kobayashi	Nippon TV Beleza
MF	(Japan) Naoko Kawakami	Tasaki Perule FC
MF	(Japan) Tomoe Sakai	Nippon TV Beleza
MF	(Japan) Ayumi Hara	Nippon TV Beleza
FW	(Japan) Harue Sato	YKK Tohoku LSC Flappers
FW	(Japan) Mito Isaka	Iga FC Kunoichi

=== Best young player ===
Player	Club
(Japan) Emi Yamamoto	Tasaki Perule FC

== See also ==
- Empress's Cup
