= 2007 Nadeshiko League Cup =

Sports in 2007

Statistics of Nadeshiko League Cup in the 2007 season.

== Overview ==
Nippon TV Beleza won the championship.

== Results ==
=== Qualifying round ===
==== Group A ====
Pos	Team	Pld	W	D	L	GF	GA	GD	Pts
1	Nippon TV Beleza	3	3	0	0	19	3	+16	9
2	JEF United Chiba Ladies	3	1	1	1	5	7	−2	4
3	Ohara Gakuen JaSRA Ladies	3	0	2	1	4	6	−2	2
4	AS Elfen Sayama FC	3	0	1	2	4	16	−12	1

==== Group B ====
Pos	Team	Pld	W	D	L	GF	GA	GD	Pts
1	Urawa Reds Ladies	3	3	0	0	17	1	+16	9
2	Albirex Niigata Ladies	3	2	0	1	10	3	+7	6
3	Fukuoka J. Anclas	3	1	0	2	5	11	−6	3
4	Bunnys Kyoto SC	3	0	0	3	2	19	−17	0

==== Group C ====
Pos	Team	Pld	W	D	L	GF	GA	GD	Pts
1	TEPCO Mareeze	3	3	0	0	15	3	+12	9
2	Tasaki Perule FC	3	2	0	1	14	6	+8	6
3	Iga FC Kunoichi	3	1	0	2	9	11	−2	3
4	Shimizudaihachi Pleiades	3	0	0	3	0	18	−18	0

==== Group D ====
Pos	Team	Pld	W	D	L	GF	GA	GD	Pts
1	INAC Leonessa	3	3	0	0	16	1	+15	9
2	Speranza FC Takatsuki	3	2	0	1	6	3	+3	6
3	Okayama Yunogo Belle	3	1	0	2	9	7	+2	3
4	Renaissance Kumamoto FC	3	0	0	3	1	21	−20	0

=== Final round ===
==== Semifinals ====
- Nippon TV Beleza 5-0 INAC Leonessa
- Urawa Reds Ladies 1-1 (pen 4-2) TEPCO Mareeze

==== Final ====
- Nippon TV Beleza 2-1 Urawa Reds Ladies
