= 1997 L.League Cup =

Japanese women's football competition

Statistics of L. League Cup in the 1997 season.

== Overview ==
Prima Ham FC Kunoichi won the championship.

== Results ==
=== Preliminary round ===
==== East ====
Pos	Team	Pld	W	D	L	GF	GA	GD	Pts
1	Yomiuri-Seiyu Beleza	4	4	0	0	7	1	+6	12
2	Nikko Securities Dream Ladies	4	2	1	1	9	3	+6	7
3	Suzuyo Shimizu FC Lovely Ladies	4	1	2	1	3	2	+1	5
4	OKI FC Winds	4	1	0	3	3	11	−8	3
5	Fujita SC Mercury	4	0	1	3	1	6	−5	1

==== West ====
Pos	Team	Pld	W	D	L	GF	GA	GD	Pts
1	Prima Ham FC Kunoichi	4	3	1	0	10	3	+7	10
2	Matsushita Electric Panasonic Bambina	4	3	0	1	10	5	+5	9
3	Tasaki Perule FC	4	1	2	1	6	4	+2	5
4	Takarazuka Bunnys	4	1	0	3	4	13	−9	3
5	Shiroki FC Serena	4	0	1	3	2	7	−5	1

=== Final round ===
==== Semifinals ====
- Yomiuri-Seiyu Beleza 1-0 Matsushita Electric Panasonic Bambina
- Nikko Securities Dream Ladies 2-3 Prima Ham FC Kunoichi

==== Third place match ====
- Matsushita Electric Panasonic Bambina 2-1 Nikko Securities Dream Ladies

==== Final ====
- Yomiuri-Seiyu Beleza 0-3 Prima Ham FC Kunoichi
