= 2008 Nadeshiko League =

Nadeshiko.League
- Season: 2008
- Champions: Nippon TV Beleza; 11th L. League title
- Relegated: Iga FC Kunoichi
- Top goalscorer: Shinobu Ono (20 goals)

The 2008 Japan Women's Soccer League was held from April to November 2008. This 20th season was nicknamed "Plenus Nadeshiko League 2008," bearing the name of the sponsor, Plenus Company Limited, a food franchise company.

Statistics of Nadeshiko.League in the 2008 season. Nippon TV Beleza won the championship.

== Division 1 ==
=== Result ===
Pos	Team	Pld	W	D	L	GF	GA	GD	Pts	Qualification
1	Nippon TV Beleza	21	17	2	2	73	22	+51	53	Champions
2	INAC Leonessa	21	14	3	4	56	26	+30	45	
3	Urawa Reds Ladies	21	13	4	4	46	18	+28	43	
4	Tasaki Perule FC	21	11	1	9	42	38	+4	34	Dissolved
5	Okayama Yunogo Belle	21	10	3	8	30	29	+1	33	
6	TEPCO Mareeze	21	5	2	14	24	43	−19	17	
7	Albirex Niigata Ladies	21	3	2	16	21	51	−30	11	
8	Iga FC Kunoichi	21	2	1	18	15	80	−65	7	Division 1 promotion/relegation Series

=== League awards ===
==== Best player ====
Player	Club
(Japan) Homare Sawa	Nippon TV Beleza

==== Top scorers ====
Rank	Scorer	Club	Goals
1	(Japan) Shinobu Ono	Nippon TV Beleza	20

==== Best eleven ====
Pos	Player	Club
GK	(Japan) Nozomi Yamago	Urawa Reds Ladies
DF	(Japan) Yukari Kinga	Nippon TV Beleza
DF	(Japan) Kyoko Yano	Urawa Reds Ladies
DF	(Japan) Azusa Iwashimizu	Nippon TV Beleza
DF	(Japan) Hiromi Ikeda	Tasaki Perule FC
MF	(Japan) Homare Sawa	Nippon TV Beleza
MF	(Japan) Aya Miyama	Okayama Yunogo Belle
MF	(Japan) Ayumi Hara	INAC Leonessa
FW	(Japan) Shinobu Ohno	Nippon TV Beleza
FW	(Japan) Kozue Ando	Urawa Reds Ladies
FW	(Brazil) Pretinha	INAC Leonessa

==== Best young player ====
Player	Club
(Japan) Mana Iwabuchi	Nippon TV Beleza

== Division 2 ==
=== Result ===
Pos	Team	Pld	W	D	L	GF	GA	GD	Pts	Promotion or qualification
1	JEF United Chiba Ladies	16	13	3	0	76	10	+66	42	Promoted for Division 1
2	Speranza FC Takatsuki	16	12	4	0	68	19	+49	40	Division 1 promotion/relegation Series
3	AS Elfen Sayama FC	16	10	2	4	55	14	+41	32	
4	Ohara Gakuen JaSRA LSC	16	7	4	5	26	26	0	25	
5	Fukuoka J. Anclas	16	7	2	7	49	24	+25	23	
6	Bunnys Kyoto SC	16	4	1	11	20	52	−32	13	
7	Shimizudaihachi Pleiades	16	2	5	9	21	38	−17	11	
8	Kagoshima Kamoike FC Asahina	16	3	1	12	18	87	−69	10	
9	Renaissance Kumamoto FC	16	3	0	13	8	76	−68	9	

- Best Player: Yuka Shimizu, JEF United Chiba Ladies

== Promotion/relegation series ==
=== Division 1 promotion/relegation series ===
2008-12-13
13:00

Iga FC Kunoichi	2 - 2 (a.e.t.)	Speranza FC Takatsuki
Penalties
	2 – 4

Ueno, Mie
- Speranza FC Takatsuki Promoted for Division 1 in 2009 Season.
- Iga FC Kunoichi Relegated to Division 2 in 2009 Season.

== See also ==
- Empress's Cup
