= 2008 Empress's Cup =

Tournament details
- Country: Japan

Final positions
- Champions: Nippon TV Beleza
- Runners-up: INAC Leonessa
- Semifinalists: Tasaki Perule FC; TEPCO Mareeze

Statistics of Empress's Cup in the 2008 season.

== Overview ==
It was contested by 32 teams, and Nippon TV Beleza won the championship.

== Results ==
=== 1st round ===
- Nagoya FC 1-2 Osaka University of Health and Sport Sciences
- Nippon Sport Science University 4-0 Fukui University of Technology Fukui High School
- Renaissance Kumamoto FC 1-6 Nippon TV Menina
- Fukuoka J. Anclas 2-6 Shimizudaihachi Pleiades
- Bucchigiri FC 0-8 Waseda University
- Hinomoto Gakuen High School 3-1 Shizuoka Sangyo University
- JFA Academy Fukushima 2-0 Hokkaido Bunkyo University Meisei High School
- Anclas FC Paso Dorad 1-2 Sakuyo High School

=== 2nd round ===
- Ohara Gakuen JaSRA 1-0 Osaka University of Health and Sport Sciences
- Nippon Sport Science University 3-0 Tokiwagi Gakuken High School
- Kibi International University 0-0 (pen 3-5) Nippon TV Menina
- Shimizudaihachi Pleiades 1-5 JEF United Chiba
- AS Elfen Sayama FC 2-3 Waseda University
- Hinomoto Gakuen High School 0-1 Speranza FC Takatsuki
- Bunnys Kyoto SC 6-5 JFA Academy Fukushima
- Sakuyo High School 0-7 Hoo High School

=== 3rd round ===
- Nippon TV Beleza 3-0 Ohara Gakuen JaSRA
- Nippon Sport Science University 0-1 Iga FC Kunoichi
- TEPCO Mareeze 7-0 Nippon TV Menina
- JEF United Chiba 1-1 (pen 5-6) Okayama Yunogo Belle
- Urawa Reds 3-0 Waseda University
- Speranza FC Takatsuki 0-2 Tasaki Perule FC
- Albirex Niigata 6-1 Bunnys Kyoto SC
- Hoo High School 1-4 INAC Leonessa

=== Quarterfinals ===
- Nippon TV Beleza 4-0 Iga FC Kunoichi
- TEPCO Mareeze 3-2 Okayama Yunogo Belle
- Urawa Reds 0-1 Tasaki Perule FC
- Albirex Niigata 1-3 INAC Leonessa

=== Semifinals ===
- Tasaki Perule FC 1-4 INAC Leonessa
- Nippon TV Beleza 3-1 TEPCO Mareeze

=== Final ===
- Nippon TV Beleza 4-1 INAC Leonessa

Nippon TV Beleza won the championship.
