= 1999 L.League Cup =

Statistics of L. League Cup in the 1999 season.

== Overview ==
NTV Beleza won the championship.

== Results ==
=== Preliminary round ===
==== East ====
Pos	Team	Pld	W	D	L	GF	GA	GD	Pts
1	OKI FC Winds	5	5	0	0	24	3	+21	15
2	NTV Beleza	5	3	1	1	30	6	+24	10
3	YKK Tohoku Flappers	5	3	1	1	15	5	+10	10
4	Urawa Reinas FC	5	1	1	3	6	21	−15	4
5	Nippon Sport Science University	5	1	0	4	6	32	−26	3
6	Tokyo Selection	5	0	1	4	4	18	−14	1

==== West ====
===== First stage =====
====== Zone A ======
Pos	Team	Pld	W	D	L	GF	GA	GD	Pts
1	Prima Ham FC Kunoichi	3	2	1	0	22	1	+21	7
2	Tasaki Perule FC	3	2	1	0	13	1	+12	7
3	Takarazuka Bunnys Junior	3	1	0	2	1	16	−15	3
4	Matsushita Electric Panasonic Ragazza	3	0	0	3	0	18	−18	0

====== Zone B ======
Pos	Team	Pld	W	D	L	GF	GA	GD	Pts
1	Matsushita Electric Panasonic Bambina	3	3	0	0	27	1	+26	9
2	Takarazuka Bunnys	3	2	0	1	12	4	+8	6
3	Kobe FC	3	1	0	2	2	17	−15	3
4	Prima Fraulein	3	0	0	3	1	20	−19	0

===== Second stage =====
====== Zone High ======
Pos	Team	Pld	W	D	L	GF	GA	GD	Pts
1	Tasaki Perule FC	6	4	1	1	10	8	+2	13
2	Prima Ham FC Kunoichi	6	3	1	2	14	9	+5	10
3	Matsushita Electric Panasonic Bambina	6	2	1	3	7	13	−6	7
4	Takarazuka Bunnys	6	1	1	4	7	8	−1	4

====== Zone Low ======
Pos	Team	Pld	W	D	L	GF	GA	GD	Pts
1	Kobe FC	6	5	0	1	19	5	+14	15
2	Matsushita Electric Panasonic Ragazza	6	4	1	1	31	7	+24	13
3	Takarazuka Bunnys Junior	6	2	1	3	11	15	−4	7
4	Prima Fraulein	6	0	0	6	2	36	−34	0

=== Final round ===
==== Semifinals ====
- OKI FC Winds 1-2 Prima Ham FC Kunoichi
- Tasaki Perule FC 0-1 NTV Beleza

==== Third place match ====
- OKI FC Winds 2-1 Tasaki Perule FC

==== Final ====
- Prima Ham FC Kunoichi 0-1 NTV Beleza
