= TEPCO Mareeze =

TEPCO Mareeze 東京電力女子サッカー部マリーゼ
- Full name: Tokyo Denryoku Ladies S.C. Mareeze
- Nickname(s): TEPCO Mareeze
- Founded: 1997
- Dissolved: 2011
- Owner: TEPCO (sponsor)

TEPCO Mareeze (東京電力女子サッカー部マリーゼ) was a women's football team which played in Division 1 of Japan's Nadeshiko League. It was a founding member of the league in 2000. The club was disbanded after the 2011 Fukushima nuclear disaster; primary sponsor TEPCO had managed the Fukushima nuclear power plant, and all of its players were TEPCO employees. Many of its players were transferred to a new club, Vegalta Sendai Ladies, in January 2012.

== Results ==
Season	Domestic League				National Cup	League Cup	League Note
Season	League	Level	Place	Tms.	National Cup	League Cup	League Note
1997	-	-	-	-	1st Stage	-	
1998	-	-	-	-	2nd Stage	-	
1999	-	-	-	-	2nd Stage	-	
2000	L	1	4th	9	Quarter-finals	-	1st Stage : (EAST)2nd
2001	L	1	3rd	10	Semi-finals	-	1st Stage : (EAST)2nd
2002	L	1	7th	11	Semi-finals	-	1st Stage : (EAST)3rd
2003	L	1	5th	13	Quarter-finals	-	1st Stage : (EAST)1st
2004	L1	1	5th	8	Quarter-finals	-	
2005	L1	1	4th	8	Quarter-finals	-	
2006	Nadeshiko Div.1	1	8th	8	3rd Stage	-	Relegated to Div.2
2007	Nadeshiko Div.2	2	1st	8	3rd Stage	Semi-finals	Promoted for Div.1
2008	Nadeshiko; Div.1	1	6th	8	Semi-finals	-	
2009	Nadeshiko; Div.1	1	3rd	8	Semi-finals	-	
2010	Nadeshiko	1	3rd	10	Quarter-finals	Semi-finals	
2011	Nadeshiko	1	-	10	DNE	-	Dissolved

== Transition of team name ==
- YKK Tohoku Ladies SC Flappers : 1997–2003
- YKK AP Tohoku Ladies SC Flappers : 2004
- TEPCO Mareeze : 2005–2011
