= 2022 Empress's Cup final =

2022年皇后杯決勝 (in Japanese)
- Event: 2022 Empress's Cup
Tokyo Verdy Beleza	INAC Kobe Leonessa
4	0
- Date: 28 January 2023
- Venue: Yodoko Sakura Stadium, Osaka
- Referee: Yoshimi Yamashita
- Attendance: 1,939
- Weather: Sunny; 7.2 °C (45.0 °F); 54% humidity

The 2022 Empress's Cup final was the final of the 2022 Empress's Cup, the 44th edition of the Empress's Cup.

The match was contested at the Yodoko Sakura Stadium in Osaka,Japan.

== Teams ==
Team	League	Previous finals appearances (bold indicates winners)
Tokyo Verdy Beleza	WE League	23 (1986, **1987**, **1988**, 1991, 1992, **1993**, 1995, 1996, **1997**, **2000**, 2002, 2003, **2004**, **2005**, **2007**, **2008**, **2009**, 2010, **2014**, **2017**, **2018**, **2019**, **2020**)
INAC Kobe Leonessa	WE League	8 (2008, **2010**, **2011**, **2012**, **2013**, **2015**, **2016**, 2018)

== Road to the final ==
Tokyo Verdy Beleza		Round	INAC Kobe Leonessa	
Opponent	Result	2022 Empress's Cup	Opponent	Result
Bye		First round	Bye	
Bye		Second round	Bye	
Bye		Third round	Bye	
MyNavi Sendai **(WE)**	4–1	Round of 16	AS Harima Albion **(NL1)**	2–1
Sanfrecce Hiroshima Regina **(WE)**	3–0	Quarter-finals	Urawa Red Diamonds **(WE)**	2–1
Albirex Niigata **(WE)**	3–1	Semi-finals	Chifure AS Elfen Saitama **(WE)**	2–1

== Format ==
The final was played as a single match, with a system of regulation time, extra time and, if necessary, a penalty shoot-out used to decide the winning team.

== Details ==
28 January 2023
15:00 JST

Tokyo Verdy Beleza	4–0	INAC Kobe Leonessa
Ueki 39', 49'; Kobayashi 81'; Fujino 90'	Report (JFA); Report (JFA) (in Japanese)

Yodoko Sakura Stadium, Osaka, Osaka
Attendance: 1,939
Referee: Yoshimi Yamashita

== See also ==
- Japan Football Association (JFA)
- 2022–23 WE League season
- 2022–23 WE League Cup
