= Midori Honda =

Japanese footballer and manager

Midori Honda 本田 美登里
Personal information
- Full name: Midori Honda
- Date of birth: 16 November 1964 (age 61)
- Place of birth: Shizuoka, Japan
- Position: Defender

Youth career
- 1975–1978: Irie SS

Senior career*
Years	Team	Apps	(Gls)
1979–1985	Shimizudaihachi SC		
1985–1992	Yomiuri Nippon SC Ladies Beleza		

International career
1981–1991	Japan	43	(0)

Managerial career
- 1991–1993: Yomiuri Menina
- 2001–2010: Okayama Yunogo Belle
- 2013–2019: AC Nagano Parceiro
- 2020–2021: Shizuoka SSU Asregina
- 2022–2024: Uzbekistan
Medal record
Shimizudaihachi SC
Winner	Empress's Cup	1980
Winner	Empress's Cup	1981
Winner	Empress's Cup	1982
Winner	Empress's Cup	1983
Winner	Empress's Cup	1984
Runner-up	Empress's Cup	1979
Yomiuri Nippon SC Ladies Beleza
Winner	Nadeshiko League	1990
Winner	Nadeshiko League	1991
Winner	Nadeshiko League	1992
Runner-up	Nadeshiko League	1989
Winner	Empress's Cup	1987
Winner	Empress's Cup	1988
Runner-up	Empress's Cup	1986
Runner-up	Empress's Cup	1991
Runner-up	Empress's Cup	1992
Representing Japan
AFC Women's Asian Cup
Silver medal – second place	1986 China
Silver medal – second place	1991 Japan
Bronze medal – third place	1989 Hong Kong
Asian Games
Silver medal – second place	1990 Beijing	Team
- * Club domestic league appearances and goals

Midori Honda (本田 美登里, Honda Midori; born 16 November 1964) is a Japanese football manager and former player who last served as the head coach of the Uzbekistan national team. As a player, Honda played for Japan national team.

== Club career ==
Honda was born in Shizuoka on 16 November 1964. She played for her local club Shimizudaihachi SC. She won Empress's Cup for 4 years in a row (1980-1983). In 1985, she moved to Yomiuri Nippon SC Ladies Beleza. The club won L.League for 3 years in a row (1990-1992). She was selected Best Eleven in 1990 season.

== National team career ==
In June 1981, when Honda was 16 years old, she was selected Japan national team for 1981 AFC Championship. At this competition, on 7 June, she debuted against Chinese Taipei. This match is Japan team first match in International A Match. She also played at 1986, 1989, 1991 AFC Championship and 1990 Asian Games. She was also a member of Japan national team for 1991 World Cup. This competition was her last game for Japan. She played 43 games for Japan until 1991.

== Coaching career ==
In 2001, Honda became manager for new club Okayama Yunogo Belle. She instructed international players, Aya Miyama, Miho Fukumoto and so on. End of 2010 season, she resigned. In 2013, she became manager for AC Nagano Parceiro.

In February 2022, Honda became the head coach of the Uzbekistan women's national football team.

== National team statistics ==
Japan national team
Year	Apps	Goals
1981	5	0
1982	0	0
1983	0	0
1984	3	0
1985	0	0
1986	6	0
1987	4	0
1988	3	0
1989	8	0
1990	5	0
1991	9	0
Total	43	0
