= Sayuri Yamaguchi =

Japanese footballer

Sayuri Yamaguchi 山口 小百合
Personal information
- Full name: Sayuri Yamaguchi
- Date of birth: July 25, 1966 (age 60)
- Place of birth: Shizuoka, Japan
- Position: Defender

Senior career*
Years	Team	Apps	(Gls)
1981–1988	Shimizudaihachi SC		
1989–1995	Suzuyo Shimizu FC Lovely Ladies		
1996–2000	Tasaki Perule FC		

International career
1981–1993	Japan	29	(1)
Medal record
Shimizudaihachi SC
Winner	Empress's Cup	1981
Winner	Empress's Cup	1982
Winner	Empress's Cup	1983
Winner	Empress's Cup	1984
Winner	Empress's Cup	1985
Winner	Empress's Cup	1986
Runner-up	Empress's Cup	1987
Suzuyo Shimizu FC Lovely Ladies
Winner	Nadeshiko League	1989
Runner-up	Nadeshiko League	1990
Runner-up	Nadeshiko League	1991
Runner-up	Nadeshiko League	1992
Runner-up	Nadeshiko League	1993
Winner	Empress's Cup	1991
Runner-up	Empress's Cup	1989
Runner-up	Empress's Cup	1990
Tasaki Perule FC
Winner	Empress's Cup	1999
Runner-up	Empress's Cup	2000
Representing Japan
AFC Women's Asian Cup
Silver medal – second place	1986 China
Silver medal – second place	1991 Japan
Bronze medal – third place	1993 Malaysia
Asian Games
Silver medal – second place	1990 Beijing	Team
- * Club domestic league appearances and goals

Sayuri Yamaguchi (山口 小百合, Yamaguchi Sayuri; born 25 July 1966) is a former Japanese football player. She played for Japan national team.

== Club career ==
Yamaguchi was born in Shizuoka Prefecture on July 25, 1966. She played for Shimizudaihachi SC, Suzuyo Shimizu FC Lovely Ladies and Tasaki Perule FC from 1981 to 2000. She was selected Best Eleven 4 times (1989, 1991, 1992 and 1993) in L.League.

== National team career ==
On September 6, 1981, when Yamaguchi was 15 years old, she debuted for Japan national team against England. She was a member of Japan for 1991 World Cup. She also played at 1986, 1991, 1993 AFC Championship and 1990 Asian Games. She played 29 games and scored 1 goal for Japan until 1993.

== National team statistics ==
Japan national team
Year	Apps	Goals
1981	2	0
1982	0	0
1983	0	0
1984	3	0
1985	0	0
1986	13	0
1987	0	0
1988	0	0
1989	0	0
1990	1	0
1991	9	1
1992	0	0
1993	1	0
Total	29	1
