= Ryoko Uno =

Japanese footballer

Ryoko Uno 宇野 涼子
Personal information
- Full name: Ryoko Uno
- Date of birth: 9 November 1975 (age 51)
- Place of birth: Sagamihara, Kanagawa, Japan
- Height: 1.64 m (5 ft 4 1/2 in)
- Position: Defender

Senior career*
Years	Team	Apps	(Gls)
1990–1999	NTV Beleza	83	(6)
2000–2007	TEPCO Mareeze	78	(0)
Total		161	(6)

International career
1991–1996	Japan	6	(0)
Medal record
NTV Beleza
Winner	Nadeshiko League	1990
Winner	Nadeshiko League	1991
Winner	Nadeshiko League	1992
Winner	Nadeshiko League	1993
Runner-up	Nadeshiko League	1994
Runner-up	Nadeshiko League	1997
Runner-up	Nadeshiko League	1998
Runner-up	Nadeshiko League	1999
Winner	Nadeshiko League Cup	1996
Winner	Nadeshiko League Cup	1999
Runner-up	Nadeshiko League Cup	1997
Winner	Empress's Cup	1993
Winner	Empress's Cup	1997
Runner-up	Empress's Cup	1991
Runner-up	Empress's Cup	1992
Runner-up	Empress's Cup	1996
Representing Japan
AFC Women's Asian Cup
Silver medal – second place	1991 Japan
Bronze medal – third place	1993 Malaysia
- * Club domestic league appearances and goals

Ryoko Uno (宇野 涼子, Uno Ryōko; born 9 November 1975) (former name; Ryoko Kobayashi, 小林 涼子) is a former Japanese football player. She played for Japan national team.

== Club career ==
Uno was born in Sagamihara on 9 November 1975. She joined Yomiuri Beleza (later NTV Beleza) in 1990. The club won L.League championship for 4 years in a row until 1993. She was selected Best Eleven for 3 years in a row from 1991 to 1993. In 2000, she moved to YKK Tohoku Ladies SC Flappers (later TEPCO Mareeze). In 2007, she retired.

== National team career ==
In May 1991, when Uno was 15 years old, she was selected Japan national team for 1991 AFC Championship in Fukuoka. At this competition, on 3 June, she debuted against Singapore. She also played at 1993 AFC Championship. She was a member of Japan for 1995 World Cup. She played 6 games for Japan until 1996.

== National team statistics ==
Japan national team
Year	Apps	Goals
1991	1	0
1992	0	0
1993	4	0
1994	0	0
1995	0	0
1996	1	0
Total	6	0
