= Tomoko Matsunaga =

Japanese footballer

Tomoko Matsunaga 松永 知子
Personal information
- Full name: Tomoko Matsunaga
- Date of birth: August 10, 1971 (age 55)
- Place of birth: Japan
- Position: Defender

Senior career*
Years	Team	Apps	(Gls)
1984–1993	Yomiuri Nippon Beleza	65	(0)
Total		65	(0)

International career
1988–1991	Japan	13	(0)
Medal record
Nippon TV Beleza
Winner	Nadeshiko League	1990
Winner	Nadeshiko League	1991
Winner	Nadeshiko League	1992
Winner	Nadeshiko League	1993
Runner-up	Nadeshiko League	1989
Winner	Empress's Cup	1987
Winner	Empress's Cup	1988
Winner	Empress's Cup	1993
Runner-up	Empress's Cup	1986
Runner-up	Empress's Cup	1991
Runner-up	Empress's Cup	1992
Representing Japan
AFC Women's Asian Cup
Silver medal – second place	1991 Japan
Bronze medal – third place	1989 Hong Kong
Asian Games
Silver medal – second place	1990 Beijing	Team
- * Club domestic league appearances and goals

Tomoko Matsunaga (松永 知子, Matsunaga Tomoko; born August 10, 1971) is a former Japanese football player. She played for Japan national team.

== Club career ==
Matsunaga was born on August 10, 1971. She played for Yomiuri Nippon Beleza from 1984. In L.League from 1989, she played 65 matches for the club in 5 season. She retired end of 1993 season.

== National team career ==
On June 1, 1988, when Matsunaga was 16 years old, she debuted for Japan national team against United States. She played at 1989, 1991 AFC Championship and 1990 Asian Games. She played 13 games for Japan until 1991.

== National team statistics ==
Japan national team
Year	Apps	Goals
1988	2	0
1989	4	0
1990	2	0
1991	5	0
Total	13	0
