= Tamaki Uchiyama =

Japanese footballer

Tamaki Uchiyama 内山 環
Personal information
- Full name: Tamaki Uchiyama
- Date of birth: December 13, 1972 (age 53)
- Place of birth: Hyogo, Japan
- Height: 1.59 m (5 ft 2 1/2 in)
- Position: Forward

Youth career
- Seitoku Gakuen High School

Senior career*
Years	Team	Apps	(Gls)
1989–1991	Tasaki Kobe	42	(15)
1992–1999	Prima Ham FC Kunoichi	104	(46)
Total		146	(61)

International career
1991–1999	Japan	58	(26)
Medal record
Prima Ham FC Kunoichi
Winner	Nadeshiko League	1995
Winner	Nadeshiko League	1999
Runner-up	Nadeshiko League	1996
Winner	Nadeshiko League Cup	1997
Winner	Nadeshiko League Cup	1998
Runner-up	Nadeshiko League Cup	1996
Runner-up	Nadeshiko League Cup	1999
Winner	Empress's Cup	1995
Winner	Empress's Cup	1998
Runner-up	Empress's Cup	1993
Runner-up	Empress's Cup	1994
Runner-up	Empress's Cup	1997
Runner-up	Empress's Cup	1999
Representing Japan
AFC Women's Asian Cup
Silver medal – second place	1991 Japan
Silver medal – second place	1995 Malaysia
Bronze medal – third place	1997 China
Asian Games
Silver medal – second place	1994 Hiroshima	Team
Bronze medal – third place	1998 Bangkok	Team
- * Club domestic league appearances and goals

Tamaki Uchiyama (内山 環, Uchiyama Tamaki; born December 13, 1972) is a former Japanese football player. She played for Japan national team.

== Club career ==
Uchiyama was born in Hyogo Prefecture on December 13, 1972. She played for Tasaki Kobe (1989–1991) and Prima Ham FC Kunoichi (1992–1999). At Prima Ham FC Kunoichi, the club won the L.League championship 2 times in 1995 and 1999. She was also selected Best Eleven 2 times (1995 and 1999).

== National team career ==
In May 1991, when Uchiyama was 18 years old, she was selected Japan national team for 1991 AFC Championship in Fukuoka. At this competition, on May 26, she debuted against North Korea. She also played at 1994, 1998 Asian Games, 1995, 1997 and 1999 AFC Championship. She was also a member of Japan for 1991, 1995, 1999 World Cup and 1996 Summer Olympics. She played 58 games and scored 26 goals for Japan until 1999.

== National team statistics ==
Japan national team
Year	Apps	Goals
1991	6	3
1992	0	0
1993	0	0
1994	5	1
1995	9	9
1996	8	3
1997	6	4
1998	10	2
1999	14	4
Total	58	26
