= Megumi Sakata =

Japanese footballer

Megumi Sakata 坂田 恵
Personal information
- Full name: Megumi Sakata
- Date of birth: 18 October 1971 (age 55)
- Place of birth: Ozu, Kumamoto, Japan
- Height: 1.66 m (5 ft 5 1/2 in)
- Position: Goalkeeper

Youth career
- 1987–1989: Ozu High School

Senior career*
Years	Team	Apps	(Gls)
1990–1993	Nissan FC	52	(0)
1994–1996	Prima Ham FC Kunoichi	34	(0)
1999–2002	Tasaki Perule FC	38	(0)
Total		124	(0)

International career
1989–1996	Japan	10	(0)
Medal record
Prima Ham FC Kunoichi
Winner	Nadeshiko League	1995
Runner-up	Nadeshiko League	1996
Runner-up	Nadeshiko League Cup	1996
Winner	Empress's Cup	1995
Runner-up	Empress's Cup	1994
Tasaki Perule FC
Runner-up	Nadeshiko League	2001
Runner-up	Nadeshiko League	2002
Winner	Empress's Cup	1999
Winner	Empress's Cup	2002
Runner-up	Empress's Cup	2000
Runner-up	Empress's Cup	2001
Representing Japan
AFC Women's Asian Cup
Silver medal – second place	1991 Japan
Silver medal – second place	1995 Malaysia
Bronze medal – third place	1989 Hong Kong
Bronze medal – third place	1993 Malaysia
Asian Games
Silver medal – second place	1990 Beijing	Team
- * Club domestic league appearances and goals

Megumi Sakata (坂田 恵, Sakata Megumi; born 18 October 1971) is a former Japanese football player. She played for Japan national team.

== Club career ==
Sakata was born in Ozu, Kumamoto on 18 October 1971. After graduating from high school, she joined for Nissan FC in 1990. However, the club was disbanded end of 1993 season. She moved to Prima Ham FC Kunoichi. She retired end of 1996 season. In 1999, she came back at Tasaki Perule FC and she played until 2002 season.

== National team career ==
In December 1989, when Sakata was 18 years old, she was selected Japan national team for 1989 AFC Championship. At this competition, on 24 December, she debuted against Nepal. She was a member of Japan for 1991 and 1995 World Cup. She also played at 1990 Asian Games, 1991, 1993 and 1995 AFC Championship. She played 10 games for Japan until 1996.

== National team statistics ==
Japan national team
Year	Apps	Goals
1989	1	0
1990	2	0
1991	3	0
1992	0	0
1993	1	0
1994	1	0
1995	1	0
1996	1	0
Total	10	0
