= 1994 L.League =

L. League
- Season: 1994
- Champions: Matsushita Electric LSC Bambina; 1st L. League title
- Relegated: Urawa Ladies FC
- Top goalscorer: Charmaine Hooper (24 goals)

Statistics of L. League in the 1994 season. Matsushita Electric LSC Bambina won the championship.

== First stage ==
Pos	Team	Pld	W	L	GF	GA	GD	Qualification
1	Yomiuri-Seiyu Beleza	9	7	2	29	7	+22	Champions
2	Nikko Securities Dream Ladies	9	7	2	17	8	+9	
3	Shiroki FC Serena	9	6	3	9	8	+1	
4	Tokyo Shidax LSC	9	5	4	15	9	+6	
5	Prima Ham FC Kunoichi	9	5	4	12	7	+5	
6	Suzuyo Shimizu FC Lovely Ladies	9	5	4	17	8	+9	
7	Matsushita Electric LSC Bambina	9	4	5	17	8	+9	
8	Fujita Tendai SC Mercury	9	4	5	6	12	−6	
9	Asahi Kokusai Bunnys	9	2	7	8	17	−9	
10	Urawa Ladies FC	9	0	9	8	54	−46	

== Second stage ==
Pos	Team	Pld	W	L	GF	GA	GD	Qualification
1	Matsushita Electric LSC Bambina	9	8	1	21	4	+17	Champions
2	Prima Ham FC Kunoichi	9	7	2	33	5	+28	
3	Suzuyo Shimizu FC Lovely Ladies	9	7	2	21	9	+12	
4	Nikko Securities Dream Ladies	9	5	4	15	10	+5	
5	Yomiuri-Seiyu Beleza	9	5	4	18	13	+5	
6	Fujita Tendai SC Mercury	9	4	5	8	16	−8	
7	Asahi Kokusai Bunnys	9	3	6	11	18	−7	
8	Tokyo Shidax LSC	9	3	6	7	14	−7	
9	Shiroki FC Serena	9	3	6	12	21	−9	
10	Urawa Ladies FC	9	0	9	6	42	−36	

== Championship playoff ==
- Yomiuri-Seiyu Beleza 0-1 Matsushita Electric LSC Bambina

Matsushita Electric LSC Bambina won the championship.

== League standings ==
Pos	Team	Pld	W	L	GF	GA	GD	Qualification
1	Matsushita Electric LSC Bambina	18	12	6	38	12	+26	Season Champions
2	Yomiuri-Seiyu Beleza	18	12	6	47	20	+27	
3	Prima Ham FC Kunoichi	18	12	6	45	12	+33	
4	Suzuyo Shimizu FC Lovely Ladies	18	12	6	38	17	+21	
5	Nikko Securities Dream Ladies	18	12	6	32	18	+14	
6	Shiroki FC Serena	18	9	9	21	29	−8	
7	Tokyo Shidax LSC	18	8	10	22	23	−1	
8	Fujita Tendai SC Mercury	18	8	10	14	28	−14	
9	Asahi Kokusai Bunnys	18	5	13	19	35	−16	
10	Urawa Ladies FC	18	0	18	14	96	−82	Division 1 promotion/relegation series

Source: RSSSF

== League awards ==
=== Best player ===
Player	Club
(Japan) Maki Haneta	Matsushita Electric LSC Bambina

=== Top scorers ===
Rank	Scorer	Club	Goals
1	(Canada) Charmaine Hooper	Prima Ham FC Kunoichi	24

=== Best eleven ===
Pos	Player	Club
GK	(Japan) Shiho Onodera	Yomiuri-Seiyu Beleza
DF	(Japan) Maki Haneta	Matsushita Electric LSC Bambina
DF	(Japan) Rie Yamaki	Nikko Securities Dream Ladies
DF	(Japan) Yumi Tomei	Prima Ham FC Kunoichi
MF	(China) Li Xiufu	Prima Ham FC Kunoichi
MF	(Japan) Asako Takakura	Yomiuri-Seiyu Beleza
MF	(Japan) Akemi Noda	Yomiuri-Seiyu Beleza
MF	(Japan) Kaoru Kadohara	Matsushita Electric LSC Bambina
FW	(Japan) Etsuko Handa	Suzuyo Shimizu FC Lovely Ladies
FW	(China) Sun Qingmei	Matsushita Electric LSC Bambina
FW	(Canada) Charmaine Hooper	Prima Ham FC Kunoichi

=== Best young player ===
Player	Club
(Japan) Mito Isaka	Urawa Ladies FC

== JLSL Challenge League ==
Pos	Team	Pld	W	D	L	Pts	Qualification
1	Tasaki Perule FC	8	7	1	0	15	Division 1 promotion/relegation series
2	Shimizudaihachi SC	8	2	2	4	6	
3	OKI Lady Thunders	8	0	3	5	3	

== Promotion/relegation series ==
=== Division 1 promotion/relegation series ===
1995-02-26

Urawa Ladies FC	1–2	Tasaki Perule FC

Urawa, Saitama

1995-03-05

Tasaki Perule FC	3–1	Urawa Ladies FC

Kyoto
- Tasaki Perule FC Promoted for Division 1 in 1995 Season.
- Urawa Ladies FC Relegated to Division 2 in 1995 Season.

== See also ==
- Empress's Cup
