= Yumi Tomei =

Japanese footballer

Yumi Tomei 東明 有美
Personal information
- Full name: Yumi Tomei
- Date of birth: 1 June 1972 (age 54)
- Place of birth: Gifu, Gifu, Japan
- Height: 1.65 m (5 ft 5 in)
- Position: Defender

Senior career*
Years	Team	Apps	(Gls)
1988–2000	Iga FC Kunoichi	183	(31)
Total		183	(31)

International career
1993–1999	Japan	43	(6)
Medal record
Iga FC Kunoichi
Winner	Nadeshiko League	1995
Winner	Nadeshiko League	1999
Runner-up	Nadeshiko League	1996
Runner-up	Nadeshiko League	2000
Winner	Nadeshiko League Cup	1997
Winner	Nadeshiko League Cup	1998
Runner-up	Nadeshiko League Cup	1996
Runner-up	Nadeshiko League Cup	1999
Winner	Empress's Cup	1995
Winner	Empress's Cup	1998
Runner-up	Empress's Cup	1993
Runner-up	Empress's Cup	1994
Runner-up	Empress's Cup	1997
Runner-up	Empress's Cup	1999
Representing Japan
AFC Women's Asian Cup
Silver medal – second place	1995 Malaysia
Bronze medal – third place	1993 Malaysia
Bronze medal – third place	1997 China
Asian Games
Silver medal – second place	1994 Hiroshima	Team
Bronze medal – third place	1998 Bangkok	Team
- * Club domestic league appearances and goals

Yumi Tomei (東明 有美, Tōmei Yumi; born 1 June 1972) is a former Japanese football player. She played for Japan national team.

== Club career ==
Tomei had a career for twelve years. She played for Iga FC Kunoichi (formerly Prima Ham FC Kunoichi) from 1988 to 2000. The club won L.League championship in 1995 and 1999. She was also selected Best Eleven 5 times (1994, 1995, 1996, 1997 and 1999).

== National team career ==
In December 1993, Tomei was selected Japan national team for 1993 AFC Championship. At this competition, on 6 December, she debuted against Philippines. She also played at 1994, 1998 Asian Games, 1995 and 1997 AFC Championship. She was a member of Japan for 1995, 1999 World Cup and 1996 Summer Olympics. She played 43 games and scored 6 goals for Japan until 1999.

== National team statistics ==
Japan national team
Year	Apps	Goals
1993	2	2
1994	6	0
1995	8	3
1996	9	0
1997	6	1
1998	6	0
1999	6	0
Total	43	6
