= 1992 L.League =

L. League
- Season: 1992
- Champions: Yomiuri Nippon SC Ladies Beleza; 3rd L. League title
- Relegated: Tasaki Kobe Ladies
- Top goalscorer: Linda Medalen (17 goals)

Statistics of L. League in the 1992 season. Yomiuri Nippon SC Ladies Beleza won the championship.

== JLSL League Standings ==
Pos	Team	Pld	W	D	L	GF	GA	GD	Pts	Qualification
1	Yomiuri Nippon SC Ladies Beleza	18	16	2	0	57	8	+49	34	Champions
2	Suzuyo Shimizu FC Lovely Ladies	18	14	2	2	49	12	+37	30	
3	Nikko Securities Dream Ladies	18	13	2	3	51	15	+36	28	
4	Matsushita Electric LSC Bambina	18	10	2	6	38	16	+22	22	
5	Prima Ham FC Kunoichi	18	9	4	5	39	23	+16	22	
6	Asahi Kokusai Bunnys	18	6	2	10	20	34	−14	14	
7	Nissan FC Ladies	18	3	7	8	16	30	−14	13	
8	Fujita Tendai SC Mercury	18	2	3	13	19	60	−41	7	
9	Shinko Seiko FC Clair	18	1	4	13	12	61	−49	6	
10	Tasaki Kobe Ladies	18	0	4	14	8	50	−42	4	Division 1 promotion/relegation Series

== League awards ==
=== Best player ===
Player	Club
(Japan) Asako Takakura	Yomiuri Nippon SC Ladies Beleza

=== Top scorers ===
Rank	Scorer	Club	Goals
1	(Norway) Linda Medalen	Nikko Securities Dream Ladies	17

=== Best eleven ===
Pos	Player	Club
GK	(Japan) Shiho Onodera	Yomiuri Nippon SC Ladies Beleza
DF	(China) Ma Li	Matsushita Electric LSC Bambina
DF	(Japan) Chiaki Shimamura	Yomiuri Nippon SC Ladies Beleza
DF	(Japan) Ryoko Uno	Yomiuri Nippon SC Ladies Beleza
DF	(Japan) Sayuri Yamaguchi	Suzuyo Shimizu FC Lovely Ladies
MF	(Taiwan) Chou Tai-ying	Suzuyo Shimizu FC Lovely Ladies
MF	(Japan) Asako Takakura	Yomiuri Nippon SC Ladies Beleza
FW	(Norway) Linda Medalen	Nikko Securities Dream Ladies
FW	(China) Sun Qingmei	Matsushita Electric LSC Bambina
FW	(Japan) Akemi Noda	Yomiuri Nippon SC Ladies Beleza
FW	(Japan) Takako Tezuka	Yomiuri Nippon SC Ladies Beleza

=== Best young player ===
Player	Club
(Japan) Yuko Morimoto	Prima Ham FC Kunoichi

== JLSL Challenge League ==
Pos	Team	Pld	W	D	L	GF	GA	GD	Pts	Qualification
1	Shiroki FC Serena	6	5	0	1	–	–	—	10	Division 1 promotion/relegation series
2	Urawa Motobuto Ladies FC	6	3	1	2	–	–	—	7	
3	Shimizudaihachi SC	6	2	1	3	–	–	—	5	
4	OKI Lady Thunders	6	1	0	5	–	–	—	2	

== Promotion/relegation series ==
=== Division 1 promotion/relegation series ===
1993-02-28

Shiroki FC Serena	0 - 0	Tasaki Kobe Ladies

Toyota Athletic Stadium

1993-03-07

Tasaki Kobe Ladies	1 - 2	Shiroki FC Serena

Kobe Universiade Memorial Stadium
- Shiroki FC Serena Promoted for Division 1 in 1993 Season.
- Tasaki Kobe Ladies Relegated to Division 2 in 1993 Season.

== See also ==
- Empress's Cup
