= 1993 L.League =

L. League
- Season: 1993
- Champions: Yomiuri Nippon SC Ladies Beleza; 4th L. League title
- Top goalscorer: Gunn Nyborg (17 goals)

Statistics of L. League in the 1993 season. Yomiuri Nippon SC Ladies Beleza won the championship.

== First stage ==
Pos	Team	Pld	W	L	GF	GA	GD	Qualification
1	Suzuyo Shimizu FC Lovely Ladies	9	9	0	28	8	+20	Champions
2	Nikko Securities Dream Ladies	9	7	2	25	15	+10	
3	Yomiuri Nippon SC Ladies Beleza	9	6	3	21	8	+13	
4	Nissan FC Ladies	9	6	3	12	6	+6	
5	Shiroki FC Serena	9	5	4	19	16	+3	
6	Prima Ham FC Kunoichi	9	4	5	11	15	−4	
7	Fujita Tendai SC Mercury	9	3	6	9	18	−9	
8	Asahi Kokusai Bunnys	9	2	7	10	15	−5	
9	Tokyo Shidax LSC	9	2	7	3	26	−23	
10	Matsushita Electric LSC Bambina	9	1	8	5	16	−11	

Source: RSSSF

== Second stage ==
Pos	Team	Pld	W	L	GF	GA	GD	Qualification
1	Yomiuri Nippon SC Ladies Beleza	11	9	2	17	2	+15	Champions
2	Nikko Securities Dream Ladies	9	7	2	14	9	+5	
3	Prima Ham FC Kunoichi	9	6	3	15	9	+6	
4	Suzuyo Shimizu FC Lovely Ladies	9	5	4	17	12	+5	
5	Shiroki FC Serena	9	5	4	11	10	+1	
6	Nissan FC Ladies	9	4	5	9	9	0	
7	Matsushita Electric LSC Bambina	9	3	6	8	11	−3	
8	Tokyo Shidax LSC	9	3	6	9	13	−4	
9	Asahi Kokusai Bunnys	9	3	6	8	16	−8	
10	Fujita Tendai SC Mercury	9	0	9	3	20	−17	

Source: RSSSF

== Championship playoff ==
- Suzuyo Shimizu FC Lovely Ladies 2–4 Yomiuri Nippon SC Ladies Beleza

Yomiuri Nippon SC Ladies Beleza won the championship.

== League standings ==
Pos	Team	Pld	W	L	GF	GA	GD	Qualification
1	Yomiuri Nippon SC Ladies Beleza	18	15	3	38	10	+28	Season Champions
2	Suzuyo Shimizu FC Lovely Ladies	18	14	4	45	20	+25	
3	Nikko Securities Dream Ladies	18	14	4	39	24	+15	
4	Nissan FC Ladies	18	10	8	21	15	+6	Dissolved
5	Shiroki FC Serena	18	10	8	30	26	+4	
6	Prima Ham FC Kunoichi	18	10	8	26	24	+2	
7	Asahi Kokusai Bunnys	18	5	13	18	31	−13	
8	Tokyo Shidax LSC	18	5	13	12	39	−27	
9	Matsushita Electric LSC Bambina	18	4	14	13	27	−14	
10	Fujita Tendai SC Mercury	18	3	15	12	38	−26	

Source: RSSSF

== League awards ==
=== Best player ===
Player	Club
(Japan) Asako Takakura	Yomiuri Nippon SC Ladies Beleza

=== Top scorers ===
Rank	Scorer	Club	Goals
1	(Japan) Etsuko Handa	Suzuyo Shimizu FC Lovely Ladies	14

=== Best eleven ===
Pos	Player	Club
GK	(Japan) Junko Ozawa	Nissan FC Ladies
DF	(Japan) Maki Haneta	Matsushita Electric LSC Bambina
DF	(Japan) Rie Yamaki	Nissan FC Ladies
DF	(Japan) Ryoko Uno	Yomiuri Nippon SC Ladies Beleza
DF	(Japan) Sayuri Yamaguchi	Suzuyo Shimizu FC Lovely Ladies
MF	(Norway) Gunn Nyborg	Nikko Securities Dream Ladies
MF	(Japan) Asako Takakura	Yomiuri Nippon SC Ladies Beleza
MF	(Japan) Akemi Noda	Yomiuri Nippon SC Ladies Beleza
MF	(Japan) Homare Sawa	Yomiuri Nippon SC Ladies Beleza
FW	(Japan) Etsuko Handa	Suzuyo Shimizu FC Lovely Ladies
FW	(United States) Brandi Chastain	Shiroki FC Serena

=== Best young player ===
Player	Club
(Japan) Inesu Emiko Takeoka	Nikko Securities Dream Ladies

== JLSL Challenge League ==
Pos	Team	Pld	W	D	L	Pts	Promotion
1	Urawa Motobuto Ladies FC	6	4	1	1	9	Promoted for Division 1
2	Tasaki Perule FC	6	4	0	2	8	
3	Shimizudaihachi SC	6	2	1	3	5	
4	OKI Lady Thunders	6	1	0	5	2	

== See also ==
- Empress's Cup
