= Rie Yamaki =

Japanese footballer

Rie Yamaki 山木 里恵
Personal information
- Full name: Rie Yamaki
- Date of birth: 2 October 1975 (age 51)
- Place of birth: Chiba, Japan
- Height: 1.64 m (5 ft 4 1/2 in)
- Position: Defender

Senior career*
Years	Team	Apps	(Gls)
1989–1993	Nissan FC	75	(10)
1994–1998	Nikko Securities Dream Ladies	80	(10)
1999–2002	Frankfurt		
2003–2004	Ohara Gakuen JaSRA	33	(10)
Total		188	(30)

International career
1993–1999	Japan	50	(3)
Medal record
Nikko Securities Dream Ladies
Winner	Nadeshiko League	1996
Winner	Nadeshiko League	1997
Winner	Nadeshiko League	1998
Runner-up	Nadeshiko League	1995
Winner	Empress's Cup	1996
Runner-up	Empress's Cup	1994
Runner-up	Empress's Cup	1998
Representing Japan
AFC Women's Asian Cup
Silver medal – second place	1995 Malaysia
Bronze medal – third place	1993 Malaysia
Bronze medal – third place	1997 China
Asian Games
Silver medal – second place	1994 Hiroshima	Team
Bronze medal – third place	1998 Bangkok	Team
- * Club domestic league appearances and goals

Rie Yamaki (山木 里恵, Yamaki Rie; born 2 October 1975) is a former Japanese football player. She played for Japan national team.

== Club career ==
Yamaki was born in Chiba Prefecture on 2 October 1975. She joined for Nissan FC in 1989. In 1989 season, she was selected Young players awards. However, the club was disbanded in 1993. In 1994, she moved to Nikko Securities Dream Ladies. The club won L.League championship for 3 years in a row (1996-1998). She was also selected MVP awards in 1997 season. However, the club was disbanded in 1998 due to financial strain. She moved to German Bundesliga club Frankfurt. In 2003, she returned to Japan and joined Ohara Gakuen JaSRA. She retired at the end of the 2004 season. She was also selected Best Eleven for 5 years in a row (1993-1997).

== National team career ==
In December 1993, when Yamaki was 18 years old, she was selected Japan national team for 1993 AFC Championship. At this competition, on 4 December, she debuted against Chinese Taipei. She also played at 1994, 1998 Asian Games, 1995 and 1997 AFC Championship. She was a member of Japan for 1995, 1999 World Cup and 1996 Summer Olympics. She played 50 games and scored 3 goals for Japan until 1999. She was also the captain.

== National team statistics ==
Japan national team
Year	Apps	Goals
1993	4	0
1994	6	0
1995	10	0
1996	10	0
1997	7	2
1998	8	1
1999	5	0
Total	50	3
