= 1997 L.League =

L. League
- Season: 1997
- Champions: Nikko Securities Dream Ladies; 2nd L. League title
- Top goalscorer: Anneli Andelén (19 goals)

Statistics of L. League in the 1997 season. Nikko Securities Dream Ladies won the championship.

== First stage ==
Pos	Team	Pld	W	L	GF	GA	GD	Qualification
1	Yomiuri-Seiyu Beleza	9	8	1	26	5	+21	Champions
2	Prima Ham FC Kunoichi	9	8	1	24	5	+19	
3	Nikko Securities Dream Ladies	9	7	2	28	8	+20	
4	Suzuyo Shimizu FC Lovely Ladies	9	6	3	17	12	+5	
5	Tasaki Perule FC	9	5	4	11	18	−7	
6	Fujita SC Mercury	9	4	5	12	11	+1	
7	Matsushita Electric Panasonic Bambina	9	3	6	18	25	−7	
8	OKI FC Winds	9	2	7	8	30	−22	
9	Takarazuka Bunnys Ladies SC	9	2	7	6	19	−13	
10	Shiroki FC Serena	9	0	9	13	30	−17	

== Second stage ==
Pos	Team	Pld	W	L	GF	GA	GD	Qualification
1	Nikko Securities Dream Ladies	9	8	1	27	7	+20	Champions
2	Yomiuri-Seiyu Beleza	9	8	1	24	5	+19	
3	Prima Ham FC Kunoichi	9	7	2	32	16	+16	
4	Suzuyo Shimizu FC Lovely Ladies	9	4	5	20	24	−4	
5	Matsushita Electric Panasonic Bambina	9	4	5	17	17	0	
6	Tasaki Perule FC	9	4	5	9	18	−9	
7	Shiroki FC Serena	9	3	6	9	18	−9	
8	OKI FC Winds	9	3	6	9	22	−13	
9	Fujita SC Mercury	9	3	6	11	23	−12	
10	Takarazuka Bunnys Ladies SC	9	1	8	10	18	−8	

== Championship playoff ==
- Yomiuri-Seiyu Beleza 1–2 Nikko Securities Dream Ladies

Nikko Securities Dream Ladies won the championship.

== League standings ==
Pos	Team	Pld	W	L	GF	GA	GD	Qualification
1	Nikko Securities Dream Ladies	18	15	3	55	15	+40	Season Champions
2	Yomiuri-Seiyu Beleza	18	16	2	50	10	+40	
3	Prima Ham FC Kunoichi	18	15	3	56	21	+35	
4	Suzuyo Shimizu FC Lovely Ladies	18	10	8	37	36	+1	
5	Tasaki Perule FC	18	9	9	20	36	−16	
6	Matsushita Electric Panasonic Bambina	18	7	11	35	42	−7	
7	Fujita SC Mercury	18	7	11	23	34	−11	
8	OKI FC Winds	18	5	13	17	52	−35	
9	Shiroki FC Serena	18	3	15	22	48	−26	
10	Takarazuka Bunnys Ladies SC	18	3	15	16	37	−21	Division 1 promotion/relegation Series

Source: RSSSF

== League awards ==
=== Best player ===
Player	Club
(Japan) Rie Yamaki	Nikko Securities Dream Ladies

=== Top scorers ===
Rank	Scorer	Club	Goals
1	(Sweden) Anneli Andelén	Suzuyo Shimizu FC Lovely Ladies	19

=== Best eleven ===
Pos	Player	Club
GK	(Japan) Shiho Onodera	Yomiuri-Seiyu Beleza
DF	(Japan) Tomoe Sakai	Yomiuri-Seiyu Beleza
DF	(Japan) Yumi Obe	Nikko Securities Dream Ladies
DF	(Japan) Rie Yamaki	Nikko Securities Dream Ladies
DF	(Japan) Yumi Tomei	Prima Ham FC Kunoichi
MF	(Norway) Hege Riise	Nikko Securities Dream Ladies
MF	(Japan) Homare Sawa	Yomiuri-Seiyu Beleza
MF	(Japan) Asako Takakura	Yomiuri-Seiyu Beleza
FW	(Japan) Nami Otake	Yomiuri-Seiyu Beleza
FW	(Japan) Mayumi Omatsu	Nikko Securities Dream Ladies
FW	(Sweden) Anneli Andelén	Suzuyo Shimizu FC Lovely Ladies

=== Best young player ===
Player	Club
(Japan) Mai Nakachi	Yomiuri-Seiyu Beleza

== Promotion/relegation series ==
=== Division 1 promotion/relegation series ===
1998-01-25

Takarazuka Bunnys Ladies SC	12 - 0	Mothers Kumamoto Rainbow Ladies

Osaka Expo '70 Stadium

1998-02-01

Mothers Kumamoto Rainbow Ladies	0 - 14	Takarazuka Bunnys Ladies SC

Suizenji Stadium
- Takarazuka Bunnys Ladies SC stay Division 1 in 1998 Season.
- Mothers Kumamoto Rainbow Ladies stay Division 2 in 1998 Season.

== See also ==
- Empress's Cup
