= 1996 L.League =

L. League
- Season: 1996
- Champions: Nikko Securities Dream Ladies; 1st L. League title
- Top goalscorer: Linda Medalen (29 goals)

Statistics of L. League in the 1996 season. Nikko Securities Dream Ladies won the championship.

== First stage ==
Pos	Team	Pld	W	L	GF	GA	GD	Qualification
1	Nikko Securities Dream Ladies	9	9	0	41	5	+36	Champions
2	Prima Ham FC Kunoichi	9	8	1	36	9	+27	
3	Yomiuri-Seiyu Beleza	9	7	2	30	8	+22	
4	Takarazuka Bunnys Ladies SC	9	6	3	20	23	−3	
5	Suzuyo Shimizu FC Lovely Ladies	9	4	5	9	14	−5	
6	Matsushita Electric Panasonic Bambina	9	3	6	11	19	−8	
7	Tasaki Perule FC	9	3	6	16	18	−2	
8	Fujita SC Mercury	9	3	6	8	16	−8	
9	Shiroki FC Serena	9	2	7	12	22	−10	
10	OKI FC Winds	9	0	9	7	56	−49	

== Second stage ==
Pos	Team	Pld	W	L	GF	GA	GD	Qualification
1	Nikko Securities Dream Ladies	9	8	1	34	6	+28	Champions
2	Prima Ham FC Kunoichi	9	8	1	23	8	+15	
3	Matsushita Electric Panasonic Bambina	9	6	3	18	12	+6	
4	Yomiuri-Seiyu Beleza	9	5	4	29	12	+17	
5	Suzuyo Shimizu FC Lovely Ladies	9	5	4	32	16	+16	
6	Shiroki FC Serena	9	4	5	18	20	−2	
7	Tasaki Perule FC	9	4	5	13	21	−8	
8	Fujita SC Mercury	9	2	7	6	21	−15	
9	Takarazuka Bunnys Ladies SC	9	2	7	8	33	−25	
10	OKI FC Winds	9	1	8	6	38	−32	

== League standings ==
Pos	Team	Pld	W	L	GF	GA	GD	Qualification
1	Nikko Securities Dream Ladies	18	17	1	75	11	+64	Season Champions
2	Prima Ham FC Kunoichi	18	16	2	59	17	+42	
3	Yomiuri-Seiyu Beleza	18	12	6	59	20	+39	
4	Suzuyo Shimizu FC Lovely Ladies	18	9	9	41	30	+11	
5	Matsushita Electric Panasonic Bambina	18	9	9	29	31	−2	
6	Takarazuka Bunnys Ladies SC	18	8	10	28	56	−28	
7	Tasaki Perule FC	18	7	11	29	39	−10	
8	Shiroki FC Serena	18	6	12	30	42	−12	
9	Fujita SC Mercury	18	5	13	14	37	−23	
10	OKI FC Winds	18	1	17	13	94	−81	Division 1 promotion/relegation Series

== League awards ==
=== Best player ===
Player	Club
(Norway) Linda Medalen	Nikko Securities Dream Ladies

=== Top scorers ===
Rank	Scorer	Club	Goals
1	(Norway) Linda Medalen	Nikko Securities Dream Ladies	29

=== Best eleven ===
Pos	Player	Club
GK	(Japan) Nozomi Yamago	Prima Ham FC Kunoichi
DF	(Japan) Tomoe Sakai	Yomiuri-Seiyu Beleza
DF	(Japan) Maki Haneta	Matsushita Electric Panasonic Bambina
DF	(Japan) Rie Yamaki	Nikko Securities Dream Ladies
DF	(Japan) Yumi Tomei	Prima Ham FC Kunoichi
MF	(Norway) Hege Riise	Nikko Securities Dream Ladies
MF	(Japan) Homare Sawa	Yomiuri-Seiyu Beleza
MF	(Japan) Yumi Obe	Nikko Securities Dream Ladies
FW	(Norway) Linda Medalen	Nikko Securities Dream Ladies
FW	(Japan) Mayumi Omatsu	Nikko Securities Dream Ladies
FW	(Canada) Charmaine Hooper	Prima Ham FC Kunoichi

=== Best young player ===
Player	Club
(United States) Natalie Neaton	Yomiuri-Seiyu Beleza

== Promotion/relegation series ==
=== JLSL Challenge match ===
Urawa Ladies FC	2 - 0	Akita FC Ladies

Akita FC Ladies	0 - 1	Urawa Ladies FC

- Urawa Ladies F.C. play to Division 1 promotion/relegation Series.

=== Division 1 promotion/relegation Series ===
1997-02-16

OKI FC Winds	3 - 1	Urawa Ladies FC

Nishigaoka Soccer Stadium

1997-02-23

Urawa Ladies FC	0 - 3	OKI FC Winds

Urawa, Saitama
- OKI FC Winds stay Division 1 in 1997 Season.
- Urawa Ladies FC stay Division 2 in 1997 Season.

== See also ==
- Empress's Cup
