= 1995 L.League =

L. League
- Season: 1995
- Champions: Prima Ham FC Kunoichi; 1st L. League title
- Top goalscorer: Charmaine Hooper (27 goals)

Statistics of L. League in the 1995 season. Prima Ham FC Kunoichi won the championship.

== First stage ==
Pos	Team	Pld	W	L	GF	GA	GD	Qualification
1	Prima Ham FC Kunoichi	9	9	0	33	6	+27	Champions
2	Nikko Securities Dream Ladies	9	7	2	24	8	+16	
3	Suzuyo Shimizu FC Lovely Ladies	9	6	3	12	11	+1	
4	Shiroki FC Serena	9	5	4	14	13	+1	
5	Matsushita Electric Panasonic Bambina	9	5	4	16	14	+2	
6	Yomiuri-Seiyu Beleza	9	4	5	17	13	+4	
7	Fujita SC Mercury	9	4	5	18	18	0	
8	Tasaki Perule FC	9	3	6	11	22	−11	
9	Tokyo Shidax LSC	9	2	7	13	30	−17	
10	Takarazuka Bunnys Ladies SC	9	0	9	4	27	−23	

== Second stage ==
Pos	Team	Pld	W	L	GF	GA	GD	Qualification
1	Prima Ham FC Kunoichi	9	9	0	28	7	+21	Champions
2	Nikko Securities Dream Ladies	9	8	1	39	10	+29	
3	Tasaki Perule FC	9	5	4	12	15	−3	
4	Yomiuri-Seiyu Beleza	9	5	4	19	11	+8	
5	Matsushita Electric Panasonic Bambina	9	5	4	12	13	−1	
6	Fujita SC Mercury	9	4	5	16	8	+8	
7	Suzuyo Shimizu FC Lovely Ladies	9	4	5	15	15	0	
8	Shiroki FC Serena	9	3	6	14	26	−12	
9	Takarazuka Bunnys Ladies SC	9	1	8	9	31	−22	
10	Tokyo Shidax LSC	9	1	8	10	38	−28	

== League standings ==
Pos	Team	Pld	W	L	GF	GA	GD	Qualification
1	Prima Ham FC Kunoichi	18	18	0	61	13	+48	Season Champions
2	Nikko Securities Dream Ladies	18	15	3	63	18	+45	
3	Suzuyo Shimizu FC Lovely Ladies	18	10	8	27	26	+1	
4	Matsushita Electric Panasonic Bambina	18	10	8	28	26	+2	
5	Yomiuri-Seiyu Beleza	18	9	9	36	25	+11	
6	Fujita SC Mercury	18	8	10	34	26	+8	
7	Shiroki FC Serena	18	8	10	28	39	−11	
8	Tasaki Perule FC	18	8	10	23	37	−14	
9	Tokyo Shidax LSC	18	3	15	23	68	−45	Dissolved
10	Takarazuka Bunnys Ladies SC	18	1	17	13	58	−45	

Source: RSSSF

== League awards ==
=== Best player ===
Player	Club
(Canada) Charmaine Hooper	Prima Ham FC Kunoichi

=== Top scorers ===
Rank	Scorer	Club	Goals
1	(Canada) Charmaine Hooper	Prima Ham FC Kunoichi	27

=== Best eleven ===
Pos	Player	Club
GK	(Japan) Shiho Onodera	Yomiuri-Seiyu Beleza
DF	(China) Wen Lirong	Prima Ham FC Kunoichi
DF	(Japan) Yumi Obe	Nikko Securities Dream Ladies
DF	(Japan) Rie Yamaki	Nikko Securities Dream Ladies
DF	(Japan) Yumi Tomei	Prima Ham FC Kunoichi
MF	(Japan) Futaba Kioka	Suzuyo Shimizu FC Lovely Ladies
MF	(Japan) Homare Sawa	Yomiuri-Seiyu Beleza
MF	(Japan) Kaoru Nagatome	Prima Ham FC Kunoichi
FW	(Norway) Linda Medalen	Nikko Securities Dream Ladies
FW	(Japan) Tamaki Uchiyama	Prima Ham FC Kunoichi
FW	(Canada) Charmaine Hooper	Prima Ham FC Kunoichi

=== Best young player ===
Player	Club
(Japan) Hiromi Isozaki	Tasaki Perule FC

== JLSL Challenge League ==
Pos	Team	Pld	W	D	L	Pts	Promotion
1	OKI Lady Thunders	4	3	0	1	6	Promoted for Division 1
2	Urawa Ladies FC	4	3	0	1	6	
3	Shimizudaihachi SC	4	0	0	4	0	

== See also ==
- Empress's Cup
