= 2021 Empress's Cup final =

2021年皇后杯決勝 (in Japanese)
- Event: 2021 Empress's Cup
Urawa Red Diamonds	JEF United Chiba
1	0
- Date: 27 February 2022
- Venue: Sanga Stadium by Kyocera, Kameoka, Kyoto Prefecture

The 2021 Empress's Cup Final was the final of the 2021 Empress's Cup, the 43rd edition of the Empress's Cup.

The match was contested at the Sanga Stadium by Kyocera in Kyoto.

== Teams ==
Team	League	Previous finals appearances (bold indicates winners)
Urawa Red Diamonds Ladies	WE League	6 (2004, 2009, 2010, 2014, 2019, 2020)
JEF United Chiba Ladies	WE League	1 (2012)

== Road to the final ==
**Urawa Red Diamonds Ladies**		Round	**JEF United Chiba Ladies**	
Opponent	Result	2022 Empress's Cup	Opponent	Result
Bye		First round	Bye	
Bye		Second round	Bye	
Bye		Third round	Bye	
Iga FC Kunoichi **(NL1)**	1–0	Round of 16	Orca Kamogawa **(NL1)**	1–0
Sanfrecce Hiroshima Regina **(WE)**	2–0	Quarter-finals	Tokyo Verdy Beleza **(WE)**	3–0
Cerezo Osaka Sakai **(WE)**	1–0	Semi-finals	Tokyo Verdy Menina **(KLU18)**	1–0

== Format ==
The final was played as a single match. If tied after regulation time, extra time and, would it necessary, a penalty shoot-out would have been used to decide the winning team.

== Details ==
27 February 2022
14:04 JST

Urawa Red Diamonds Ladies	1–0	JEF United Chiba Ladies
Sugasawa 67'	Report (JFA); Report (JFA) (in Japanese)

Sanga Stadium by Kyocera, Kameoka, Kyoto
Attendance: 1,375
Referee: Emi Chiba

**Urawa Red Diamonds Ladies**	**JEF United Chiba Ladies**
