= 1990 Empress's Cup =

Tournament details
- Country: Japan

Final positions
- Champions: Nikko Securities Dream Ladies
- Runners-up: Shimizu FC Ladies
- Semifinalists: Yomiuri SC Beleza; Prima Ham FC Kunoichi

Statistics of Empress's Cup in the 1990 season.

== Overview ==
It was contested by 16 teams, and Nikko Securities Dream Ladies won the championship.

== Results ==
=== 1st Round ===
- Yomiuri SC Beleza 5-0 Seiwa Gakuen SC
- Ota Gal 1-1 (pen 3–4) Asahi Kokusai Bunnys
- Shinko Seiko FC Clair 4-0 Shibecha Ladies
- Nikko Securities Dream Ladies 0-0 (pen 4–1) Nissan FC
- Prima Ham FC Kunoichi 2-1 Hiroshima Minami FC
- Nawashiro Ladies 0-5 Takatsuki FC
- Tasaki-Shinju Kobe 5-0 Shimizudaihachi SC
- Akita FC 0-9 Suzuyo Shimizu FC Lovely Ladies

=== Quarterfinals ===
- Yomiuri SC Beleza 6-3 Asahi Kokusai Bunnys
- Shinko Seiko FC Clair 0-1 Nikko Securities Dream Ladies
- Prima Ham FC Kunoichi 2-1 Takatsuki FC
- Tasaki-Shinju Kobe 0-2 Suzuyo Shimizu FC Lovely Ladies

=== Semifinals ===
- Yomiuri SC Beleza 0-0 (pen 2–4) Nikko Securities Dream Ladies
- Prima Ham FC Kunoichi 0-1 Suzuyo Shimizu FC Lovely Ladies

=== Final ===
- Nikko Securities Dream Ladies 3-3 (pen 4–1) Suzuyo Shimizu FC Lovely Ladies

Nikko Securities Dream Ladies won the championship.
