= 1979 Empress's Cup final =

1979 Empress's Cup Final
| FC Jinnan | Takatsuki FC |
| 2 | 1 |
- Date: March 23, 1980
- Venue: Mitsubishi Yowa Sugamo Ground, Tokyo

1979 Empress's Cup Final was the 1st final of the Empress's Cup competition. The final was played at Mitsubishi Yowa Sugamo Ground in Tokyo on March 23, 1980. FC Jinnan won the championship.

== Overview ==
FC Jinnan won their 1st title, by defeating Takatsuki FC 2–1.

== Match details ==
March 23, 1980

| FC Jinnan | 2-1 | Takatsuki FC |
|---|---|---|
| ? ?' ? ?' | | ? ?' |

Mitsubishi Yowa Sugamo Ground

== See also ==
- 1979 Empress's Cup
