= 1989 Empress's Cup =

Tournament details
- Country: Japan

Final positions
- Champions: Takatsuki FC
- Runners-up: Shimizu FC Ladies
- Semifinalists: Shinko Seiko FC Clair; Tasaki-Shinju Kobe

Statistics of Empress's Cup in the 1989 season.

== Overview ==
It was contested by 16 teams, and Takatsuki FC won the championship.

== Results ==
=== 1st Round ===
- Shimizu FC Ladies 10-0 Toyama Ladies SC
- Tokyo Women's College of Physical Education 2-0 Sapporo Habatake
- Nissan FC 2-1 Shimizudaihachi SC
- Akita FC 0-3 Shinko Seiko FC Clair
- Tasaki-Shinju Kobe 3-0 Uwajima Minami High School
- Jonan Ladies 0-8 Prima Ham FC Kunoichi
- Takatsuki FC 5-0 Seiwa Gakuen SC
- Urawa Motobuto 0-7 Yomiuri SC Beleza

=== Quarterfinals ===
- Shimizu FC Ladies 4-0 Tokyo Women's College of Physical Education
- Nissan FC 0-0 (pen 2–3) Shinko Seiko FC Clair
- Tasaki-Shinju Kobe 0-0 (pen 3–1) Prima Ham FC Kunoichi
- Takatsuki FC 0-0 (pen 2–4) Yomiuri SC Beleza

=== Semifinals ===
- Shimizu FC Ladies 5-0 Shinko Seiko FC Clair
- Tasaki-Shinju Kobe 0-1 Takatsuki FC

=== Final ===
- Shimizu FC Ladies 0-1 Takatsuki FC

Takatsuki FC won the championship.
