= 1989 Empress's Cup final =

1989 Empress's Cup Final
Takatsuki FC	Shimizu FC Ladies
1	0
- Date: March 25, 1990
- Venue: National Stadium, Tokyo

1989 Empress's Cup Final was the 11th final of the Empress's Cup competition. The final was played at National Stadium in Tokyo on March 25, 1990. Takatsuki FC won the championship.

== Overview ==
Takatsuki FC won their 1st title, by defeating Shimizu FC Ladies 1–0.

== Match details ==
March 25, 1990

Takatsuki FC	1-0	Shimizu FC Ladies
? ?'

National Stadium

== See also ==
- 1989 Empress's Cup
