= 1984 Empress's Cup final =

1984 Empress's Cup Final
| Shimizudaihachi SC | Takatsuki FC |
| 4 | 0 |
- Date: March 31, 1985
- Venue: National Stadium, Tokyo

1984 Empress's Cup Final was the 6th final of the Empress's Cup competition. The final was played at National Stadium in Tokyo on March 31, 1985. Shimizudaihachi SC won the championship.

== Overview ==
Defending champion Shimizudaihachi SC won their 5th title, by defeating Takatsuki FC 4–0. Shimizudaihachi SC won the title for 5 years in a row.

== Match details ==
March 31, 1985

| Shimizudaihachi SC | 4-0 | Takatsuki FC |
|---|---|---|
| ?' ? ?' ? ?' ? ?' |

National Stadium

== See also ==
- 1984 Empress's Cup
