= 1981 Empress's Cup final =

1981 Empress's Cup Final
Shimizudaihachi SC	FC PAF
6	0
- Date: March 21, 1982
- Venue: Nishigaoka Soccer Stadium, Tokyo

1981 Empress's Cup Final was the 3rd final of the Empress's Cup competition. The final was played at Nishigaoka Soccer Stadium in Tokyo on March 21, 1982. Shimizudaihachi SC won the championship.

== Overview ==
Defending champion Shimizudaihachi SC won their 2nd title, by defeating FC PAF 6–0. Shimizudaihachi SC won the title for 2 years in a row.

== Match details ==
March 21, 1982

Shimizudaihachi SC	6-0	FC PAF
? ?' ? ?' ? ?' ? ?' ? ?' ? ?'

Nishigaoka Soccer Stadium

== See also ==
- 1981 Empress's Cup
