= 1988 Empress's Cup =

Tournament details
- Country: Japan

Final positions
- Champions: Yomiuri SC Beleza
- Runners-up: Takatsuki FC
- Semifinalists: Nissan FC; Shimizudaihachi SC

Statistics of Empress's Cup in the 1988 season.

== Overview ==
It was contested by 16 teams, and Yomiuri SC Beleza won the championship.

== Results ==
=== 1st Round ===
- Yomiuri SC Beleza 10-0 Toyama Ladies SC
- FC PAF 0-2 Hyogo University of Teacher Education
- Nissan FC 8-0 Nagoya Ladies FC
- Uwajima Minami High School 0-3 Kobe FC
- Shimizudaihachi SC 4-0 Molten Habatake
- Miyagi Hirose Club 0-0 (pen 2–3) Sagamihara LSC
- Takatsuki FC 2-1 Kumamoto Akita
- Hatsukaichi High School 0-4 Shinko Seiko FC Clair

=== Quarterfinals ===
- Yomiuri SC Beleza 3-0 Hyogo University of Teacher Education
- Nissan FC 1-0 Kobe FC
- Shimizudaihachi SC 5-0 Sagamihara LSC
- Takatsuki FC 1-0 Shinko Seiko FC Clair

=== Semifinals ===
- Yomiuri SC Beleza 5-0 Nissan FC
- Shimizudaihachi SC 0-3 Takatsuki FC

=== Final ===
- Yomiuri SC Beleza 2-0 Takatsuki FC

Yomiuri SC Beleza won the championship.
