= 1996 Empress's Cup =

Tournament details
- Country: Japan

Final positions
- Champions: Nikko Securities Dream Ladies
- Runners-up: Yomiuri-Seiyu Beleza
- Semifinalists: Suzuyo Shimizu FC Lovely Ladies; Prima Ham FC Kunoichi

Statistics of Empress's Cup in the 1996 season.

== Overview ==
It was contested by 20 teams, and Nikko Securities Dream Ladies won the championship.

== Results ==
=== 1st round ===
- Akita FC 0-3 OKI FC Winds
- Kochi JFC Rosa 0-6 Yomiuri Menina
- Toyama Ladies SC 0-4 Shimizudaihachi SC
- Shiroki FC Serena 5-0 Takarazuka Bunnys Junior

=== 2nd round ===
- Nikko Securities Dream Ladies 4-0 OKI FC Winds
- Scramble FC 0-11 Fujita SC Mercury
- Suzuyo Shimizu FC Lovely Ladies 7-0 Sapporo Linda
- Yomiuri Menina 2-3 Takarazuka Bunnys
- Yomiuri-Seiyu Beleza 8-0 Shimizudaihachi SC
- Morioka Zebla LFC 0-8 Matsushita Electric Panasonic Bambina
- Tasaki Perule FC 2-0 Urawa FC
- Shiroki FC Serena 1-5 Prima Ham FC Kunoichi

=== Quarterfinals ===
- Nikko Securities Dream Ladies 3-1 Fujita SC Mercury
- Suzuyo Shimizu FC Lovely Ladies 8-5 Takarazuka Bunnys
- Yomiuri-Seiyu Beleza 2-1 Matsushita Electric Panasonic Bambina
- Tasaki Perule FC 3-4 Prima Ham FC Kunoichi

=== Semifinals ===
- Nikko Securities Dream Ladies 3-2 Suzuyo Shimizu FC Lovely Ladies
- Yomiuri-Seiyu Beleza 3-2 Prima Ham FC Kunoichi

=== Final ===
- Nikko Securities Dream Ladies 3-0 Yomiuri-Seiyu Beleza

Nikko Securities Dream Ladies won the championship.
