= 1992 Empress's Cup =

Tournament details
- Country: Japan

Final positions
- Champions: Nikko Securities Dream Ladies
- Runners-up: Yomiuri Nippon SC Beleza
- Semifinalists: Prima Ham FC Kunoichi; Suzuyo Shimizu FC Lovely Ladies

Statistics of Empress's Cup in the 1992 season.

== Overview ==
It was contested by 20 teams, and Nikko Securities Dream Ladies won the championship.

== Results ==
=== 1st round ===
- Gifu Ladies FC 0-4 Tasaki Kobe
- Toyama Ladies SC 3-1 FC Sera Fuchu
- Sapporo Linda 3-2 Ozu High School
- Shinko Seiko FC Clair 10-0 Ota Gal

=== 2nd round ===
- Yomiuri Nippon SC Beleza 6-1 Tasaki Kobe
- Fujita Tendai SC Mercury 2-0 Ishinomaki Women's Commercial High School
- Prima Ham FC Kunoichi 5-0 Nippon Sport Science University
- Toyama Ladies SC 0-8 Matsushita Electric LSC Bambina
- Nikko Securities Dream Ladies 11-0 Sapporo Linda
- Shiroki FC Serena 0-3 Asahi Kokusai Bunnys
- Nissan FC 4-0 Takatsuki FC
- Shinko Seiko FC Clair 0-1 Suzuyo Shimizu FC Lovely Ladies

=== Quarterfinals ===
- Yomiuri Nippon SC Beleza 2-1 Fujita Tendai SC Mercury
- Prima Ham FC Kunoichi 1-1 (pen 6–5) Matsushita Electric LSC Bambina
- Nikko Securities Dream Ladies 7-0 Asahi Kokusai Bunnys
- Nissan FC 0-1 Suzuyo Shimizu FC Lovely Ladies

=== Semifinals ===
- Yomiuri Nippon SC Beleza 1-1 (pen 4–3) Prima Ham FC Kunoichi
- Nikko Securities Dream Ladies 3-3 (pen 5–3) Suzuyo Shimizu FC Lovely Ladies

=== Final ===
- Yomiuri Nippon SC Beleza 0-1 Nikko Securities Dream Ladies

Nikko Securities Dream Ladies won the championship.
