= 1995 Empress's Cup =

Tournament details
- Country: Japan

Final positions
- Champions: Fujita SC Mercury
- Runners-up: Yomiuri-Seiyu Beleza
- Semifinalists: Prima Ham FC Kunoichi; Tokyo Shidax LSC

Statistics of Empress's Cup in the 1995 season.

== Overview ==
It was contested by 20 teams, and Fujita SC Mercury won the championship.

== Results ==
=== 1st round ===
- OKI Lady Thunders 1-3 Takarazuka Bunnys
- Chukyo Women's University 4-1 FC Shibecha
- Jonan Ladies 3-4 Akita FC
- Tokyo Shidax LSC 6-0 Socius Amigo

=== 2nd round ===
- Prima Ham FC Kunoichi 2-1 Takarazuka Bunnys
- Ishinomaki Women's Commercial High School 1-9 Tasaki Perule FC
- Yomiuri-Seiyu Beleza 13-1 Toyama Ladies SC
- Chukyo Women's University 0-9 Matsushita Electric Panasonic Bambina
- Suzuyo Shimizu FC Lovely Ladies 11-0 Akita FC
- Japan Women's College of Physical Education 0-8 Fujita SC Mercury
- Shiroki FC Serena 7-0 Matsushita Electric Panasonic Ragazza
- Tokyo Shidax LSC 1-0 Nikko Securities Dream Ladies

=== Quarterfinals ===
- Prima Ham FC Kunoichi 4-0 Tasaki Perule FC
- Yomiuri-Seiyu Beleza 1-0 Matsushita Electric Panasonic Bambina
- Suzuyo Shimizu FC Lovely Ladies 2-2 (pen 1-3) Fujita SC Mercury
- Shiroki FC Serena 0-0 (pen 2-3) Tokyo Shidax LSC

=== Semifinals ===
- Prima Ham FC Kunoichi 1-1 (pen 3-4) Yomiuri-Seiyu Beleza
- Fujita SC Mercury 1-0 Tokyo Shidax LSC

=== Final ===
- Yomiuri-Seiyu Beleza 2-3 Fujita SC Mercury

Fujita SC Mercury won the championship.
