= 1985 Empress's Cup final =

1985 Empress's Cup Final
Shimizudaihachi SC	Takatsuki FC
5	1
- Date: March 30, 1986
- Venue: National Stadium, Tokyo

1985 Empress's Cup Final was the 7th final of the Empress's Cup competition. The final was played at National Stadium in Tokyo on March 30, 1986. Shimizudaihachi SC won the championship.

== Overview ==
Defending champion Shimizudaihachi SC won their 6th title, by defeating Takatsuki FC 5–1. Shimizudaihachi SC won the title for 6 years in a row.

== Match details ==
March 30, 1986

Shimizudaihachi SC	5-1	Takatsuki FC
? ?' ? ?' ? ?' ? ?' ? ?'		? ?'

National Stadium

== See also ==
- 1985 Empress's Cup
