= 1980 Empress's Cup final =

1980 Empress's Cup Final
Shimizudaihachi SC	FC Jinnan
2	0
- Date: March 22, 1981
- Venue: Mitsubishi Yowa Sugamo Ground, Tokyo

1980 Empress's Cup Final was the 2nd final of the Empress's Cup competition. The final was played at Mitsubishi Yowa Sugamo Ground in Tokyo on March 22, 1981. Shimizudaihachi SC won the championship.

== Overview ==
Shimizudaihachi SC won their 1st title, by defeating FC Jinnan 2–0.

== Match details ==
March 22, 1981

Shimizudaihachi SC	2-0	FC Jinnan
? ?' ? ?'

Mitsubishi Yowa Sugamo Ground

== See also ==
- 1980 Empress's Cup
