= 1982 Empress's Cup final =

1982 Empress's Cup Final
Shimizudaihachi SC	FC Jinnan
6	0
- Date: March 21, 1983
- Venue: Nishigaoka Soccer Stadium, Tokyo

1982 Empress's Cup Final was the 4th final of the Empress's Cup competition. The final was played at Nishigaoka Soccer Stadium in Tokyo on March 21, 1983. Shimizudaihachi SC won the championship.

== Overview ==
Defending champion Shimizudaihachi SC won their 3rd title, by defeating FC Jinnan 6–0. Shimizudaihachi SC won the title for 3 years in a row.

== Match details ==
March 21, 1983

Shimizudaihachi SC	6-0	FC Jinnan
? ?' ? ?' ? ?' ? ?' ? ?' ? ?'

Nishigaoka Soccer Stadium

== See also ==
- 1982 Empress's Cup
