= 1983 Empress's Cup final =

1983 Empress's Cup Final
Shimizudaihachi SC	Takatsuki FC
2	0
- Date: March 25, 1984
- Venue: National Stadium, Tokyo

1983 Empress's Cup Final was the 5th final of the Empress's Cup competition. The final was played at National Stadium in Tokyo on March 25, 1984. Shimizudaihachi SC won the championship.

== Overview ==
Defending champion Shimizudaihachi SC won their 4th title, by defeating Takatsuki FC 2–0. Shimizudaihachi SC won the title for 4 years in a row.

== Match details ==
March 25, 1984

Shimizudaihachi SC	2-0	Takatsuki FC
? ?' ? ?'

National Stadium

== See also ==
- 1983 Empress's Cup
