= 1990 Empress's Cup final =

1990 Empress's Cup Final
Nikko Securities Dream Ladies	Suzuyo Shimizu FC Lovely Ladies
3	3
- Date: March 31, 1991
- Venue: Nishigaoka Soccer Stadium, Tokyo

1990 Empress's Cup Final was the 12th final of the Empress's Cup competition. The final was played at Nishigaoka Soccer Stadium in Tokyo on March 31, 1991. Nikko Securities Dream Ladies won the championship.

== Overview ==
Nikko Securities Dream Ladies won their 1st title, by defeating Suzuyo Shimizu FC Lovely Ladies on a penalty shoot-out.

== Match details ==
March 31, 1991

Nikko Securities Dream Ladies	3-3 (pen 4-1)	Suzuyo Shimizu FC Lovely Ladies
? (?) ? (?) ? (?)		? (?) ? (?) ? (?)

Nishigaoka Soccer Stadium

== See also ==
- 1990 Empress's Cup
