= 1998 L.League =

L. League
- Season: 1998
- Champions: Nikko Securities Dream Ladies; 3rd L. League title
- Top goalscorer: Miyuki Izumi (21 goals)

Statistics of L. League in the 1998 season. Nikko Securities Dream Ladies won the championship.

== First stage ==
Pos	Team	Pld	W	L	GF	GA	GD	Qualification
1	Nikko Securities Dream Ladies	9	9	0	26	7	+19	Champions
2	Yomiuri Beleza	9	8	1	34	8	+26	
3	Prima Ham FC Kunoichi	9	6	3	22	15	+7	
4	Takarazuka Bunnys Ladies SC	9	6	3	14	10	+4	
5	Suzuyo Shimizu FC Lovely Ladies	9	5	4	22	16	+6	
6	Matsushita Electric Panasonic Bambina	9	4	5	21	26	−5	
7	Tasaki Perule FC	9	2	7	14	20	−6	
8	Shiroki FC Serena	9	2	7	9	19	−10	
9	OKI FC Winds	9	2	7	3	23	−20	
10	Fujita SC Mercury	9	1	8	7	28	−21	

== Second stage ==
Pos	Team	Pld	W	L	GF	GA	GD	Qualification
1	Nikko Securities Dream Ladies	9	8	1	28	6	+22	Champions
2	Suzuyo Shimizu FC Lovely Ladies	9	8	1	27	7	+20	
3	Matsushita Electric Panasonic Bambina	9	7	2	22	14	+8	
4	Yomiuri Beleza	9	6	3	15	13	+2	
5	Prima Ham FC Kunoichi	9	5	4	24	17	+7	
6	Takarazuka Bunnys Ladies SC	9	4	5	24	13	+11	
7	Tasaki Perule FC	9	3	6	10	18	−8	
8	Fujita SC Mercury	9	2	7	9	22	−13	
9	OKI FC Winds	9	2	7	6	21	−15	
10	Shiroki FC Serena	9	0	9	8	42	−34	

== League standings ==
Pos	Team	Pld	W	D	L	GF	GA	GD	Qualification
1	Nikko Securities Dream Ladies	18	17	0	1	54	13	+41	Season Champions, Dissolved
2	Yomiuri Beleza	18	14	0	4	49	21	+28	
3	Suzuyo Shimizu FC Lovely Ladies	18	13	0	5	49	23	+26	Moved to Regional League
4	Prima Ham FC Kunoichi	18	11	0	7	46	32	+14	
5	Matsushita Electric Panasonic Bambina	18	11	0	7	43	40	+3	
6	Takarazuka Bunnys Ladies SC	18	10	0	8	38	23	+15	
7	Tasaki Perule FC	18	5	0	13	24	38	−14	
8	OKI FC Winds	18	4	0	14	9	44	−35	
9	Fujita SC Mercury	18	3	0	15	16	50	−34	Dissolved
10	Shiroki FC Serena	18	2	0	16	17	61	−44	Dissolved

Source: RSSSF

== League awards ==
=== Best player ===
Player	Club
(Norway) Agnete Carlsen	Nikko Securities Dream Ladies

=== Top scorers ===
Rank	Scorer	Club	Goals
1	(Japan) Miyuki Izumi	Suzuyo Shimizu FC Lovely Ladies	21

=== Best eleven ===
Pos	Player	Club
GK	(Japan) Naoko Nishigai	Nikko Securities Dream Ladies
DF	(Japan) Tomoe Sakai	Yomiuri Beleza
DF	(Japan) Yumi Obe	Nikko Securities Dream Ladies
DF	(Japan) Kae Nishina	Prima Ham FC Kunoichi
DF	(Japan) Maki Haneta	Matsushita Electric Panasonic Bambina
MF	(Norway) Agnete Carlsen	Nikko Securities Dream Ladies
MF	(Japan) Homare Sawa	Yomiuri Beleza
MF	(Japan) Asako Takakura	Yomiuri Beleza
FW	(Japan) Mayumi Omatsu	Yomiuri Beleza
FW	(Japan) Miyuki Izumi	Yomiuri Beleza
FW	(Spain) Ángeles Parejo	Takarazuka Bunnys Ladies SC

=== Best young player ===
Player	Club
(Japan) Yumiko Tsuhako	Suzuyo Shimizu FC Lovely Ladies

== See also ==
- Empress's Cup
