= 2006 Empress's Cup final =

2006 Empress's Cup Final
Tasaki Perule FC	Okayama Yunogo Belle
2	0
- Date: January 1, 2007
- Venue: National Stadium, Tokyo

2006 Empress's Cup Final was the 28th final of the Empress's Cup competition. The final was played at National Stadium in Tokyo on January 1, 2007. Tasaki Perule FC won the championship.

== Overview ==
Tasaki Perule FC won their 4th title, by defeating Okayama Yunogo Belle 2–0 with Tomoko Suzuki goal.

== Match details ==
January 1, 2007

Tasaki Perule FC	2-0	Okayama Yunogo Belle
Tomoko Suzuki 9', 38'	Report

National Stadium

== See also ==
- 2006 Empress's Cup
