= Tomoko Suzuki =

Japanese footballer

Tomoko Suzuki 鈴木 智子
Personal information
- Full name: Tomoko Suzuki
- Date of birth: January 26, 1982 (age 44)
- Place of birth: Kanagawa, Japan
- Height: 1.65 m (5 ft 5 in)
- Position: Forward

Youth career
- 1997–1999: Shonan Women's High School

Senior career*
Years	Team	Apps	(Gls)
2000–2007	Tasaki Perule FC	117	(49)
2008–2009	INAC Kobe Leonessa		

International career
2003–2005	Japan	3	(2)
Medal record
Tasaki Perule FC
Winner	Nadeshiko League	2003
Runner-up	Nadeshiko League	2001
Runner-up	Nadeshiko League	2002
Runner-up	Nadeshiko League	2005
Runner-up	Nadeshiko League	2007
Winner	Empress's Cup	2002
Winner	Empress's Cup	2003
Winner	Empress's Cup	2006
Runner-up	Empress's Cup	2000
Runner-up	Empress's Cup	2001
Runner-up	Empress's Cup	2005
Runner-up	Empress's Cup	2007
INAC Kobe Leonessa
Runner-up	Nadeshiko League	2008
Runner-up	Empress's Cup	2008
- * Club domestic league appearances and goals

Tomoko Suzuki (鈴木 智子, Suzuki Tomoko; born January 26, 1982) is a former Japanese football player. She played for Japan national team.

== Club career ==
Suzuki was born in Kanagawa Prefecture on January 26, 1982. After graduating from high school, she joined Tasaki Perule FC in 2000. She moved to INAC Leonessa (later INAC Kobe Leonessa) in 2008. She retired in 2009.

== National team career ==
On January 12, 2003, Suzuki debuted for Japan national team against United States. She played 3 games and scored 2 goals for Japan until 2005.

== National team statistics ==
Japan national team
Year	Apps	Goals
2003	2	2
2004	0	0
2005	1	0
Total	3	2
