= 1999 Empress's Cup final =

1999 Empress's Cup Final
Tasaki Perule FC	Prima Ham FC Kunoichi
0	0
- Tasaki Perule won 4–2 on penalties
- Date: January 16, 2000
- Venue: National Stadium, Tokyo

1999 Empress's Cup Final was the 21st final of the Empress's Cup competition. The final was played at National Stadium in Tokyo on January 16, 2000. Tasaki Perule FC won the championship.

== Overview ==
Tasaki Perule FC won their 1st title, by defeating defending champion Prima Ham FC Kunoichi on a penalty shoot-out.

== Match details ==
January 16, 2000

Tasaki Perule FC	0-0 (pen 4-2)	Prima Ham FC Kunoichi

National Stadium

== See also ==
- 1999 Empress's Cup
