= 1995 Empress's Cup final =

1995 Empress's Cup Final
Fujita SC Mercury	Yomiuri-Seiyu Beleza
3	2
- Date: March 3, 1996
- Venue: Nishigaoka Soccer Stadium, Tokyo

1995 Empress's Cup Final was the 17th final of the Empress's Cup competition. The final was played at Nishigaoka Soccer Stadium in Tokyo on March 3, 1996. Fujita SC Mercury won the championship.

== Overview ==
Fujita SC Mercury won their 1st title, by defeating Yomiuri-Seiyu Beleza 3–2.

== Match details ==
March 3, 1996

Fujita SC Mercury	3-2	Yomiuri-Seiyu Beleza
? ?' ? ?' ? ?'		? ?' ? ?'

Nishigaoka Soccer Stadium

== See also ==
- 1995 Empress's Cup
