= 2001 Empress's Cup final =

2001 Empress's Cup Final
Iga FC Kunoichi	Tasaki Perule FC
2	1
- Date: January 20, 2002
- Venue: National Stadium, Tokyo

2001 Empress's Cup Final was the 23rd final of the Empress's Cup competition. The final was played at National Stadium in Tokyo on January 20, 2002. Iga FC Kunoichi won the championship.

== Overview ==
Iga FC Kunoichi won their 3rd title, by defeating Tasaki Perule FC 2–1.

== Match details ==
January 20, 2002

Iga FC Kunoichi	2-1	Tasaki Perule FC
? (?) ? (?)		? (?)

National Stadium

== See also ==
- 2001 Empress's Cup
