= 1985 Empress's Cup =

Tournament details
- Country: Japan

Final positions
- Champions: Shimizudaihachi SC
- Runners-up: Takatsuki FC
- Semifinalists: Kobe FC; FC Jinnan

Statistics of Empress's Cup in the 1985 season.

== Overview ==
It was contested by 16 teams, and Shimizudaihachi SC won the championship.

== Results ==
=== 1st Round ===
- Shimizudaihachi SC 16-0 Yonago Cosmos
- Miyagi Hirose High School 0-2 Chigasaki Fevers
- Kobe FC 3-0 Kumamoto Akita
- Nagoya LFC 0-5 FC Jinnan
- Yomiuri SC Beleza 14-0 Ladies Saijo
- Hyogo University of Teacher Education 3-0 Uwajima Minami High School
- Yonan SC 0-0 (pen 3–5) Shizuoka Koki SC
- Molten Habatake 0-7 Takatsuki FC

=== Quarterfinals ===
- Shimizudaihachi SC 6-0 Chigasaki Fevers
- Kobe FC 1-0 FC Jinnan
- Yomiuri SC Beleza 3-0 Hyogo University of Teacher Education
- Shizuoka Koki SC 0-3 Takatsuki FC

=== Semifinals ===
- Shimizudaihachi SC 2-0 Kobe FC
- Yomiuri SC Beleza 0-1 Takatsuki FC

=== Final ===
- Shimizudaihachi SC 5-1 Takatsuki FC

Shimizudaihachi SC won the championship.
