= 1994 Empress's Cup final =

1994 Empress's Cup Final
| Prima Ham FC Kunoichi | Nikko Securities Dream Ladies |
| 4 | 1 |
- Date: March 26, 1995
- Venue: Nishigaoka Soccer Stadium, Tokyo

1994 Empress's Cup Final was the 16th final of the Empress's Cup competition. The final was played at Nishigaoka Soccer Stadium in Tokyo on March 26, 1995. Prima Ham FC Kunoichi won the championship.

== Overview ==
Prima Ham FC Kunoichi won their 1st title, by defeating Nikko Securities Dream Ladies 4–1.

== Match details ==
March 26, 1995

| Prima Ham FC Kunoichi | 4-1 | Nikko Securities Dream Ladies |
|---|---|---|
| ? (?) ? (?) ? (?) ? (?) | | ? (?) |

Nishigaoka Soccer Stadium

== See also ==
- 1994 Empress's Cup
