= 1998 Empress's Cup final =

1998 Empress's Cup Final
Prima Ham FC Kunoichi	Nikko Securities Dream Ladies
1	0
- Date: January 17, 1999
- Venue: National Stadium, Tokyo

1998 Empress's Cup Final was the 20th final of the Empress's Cup competition. The final was played at National Stadium in Tokyo on January 17, 1999. Prima Ham FC Kunoichi won the championship.

== Overview ==
Prima Ham FC Kunoichi won their 3rd title, by defeating Nikko Securities Dream Ladies 1–0.

== Match details ==
January 17, 1999

Prima Ham FC Kunoichi	1-0	Nikko Securities Dream Ladies
? (?)

National Stadium

== See also ==
- 1998 Empress's Cup
