= 1997 Empress's Cup =

Tournament details
- Country: Japan

Final positions
- Champions: Yomiuri-Seiyu Beleza
- Runners-up: Prima Ham FC Kunoichi
- Semifinalists: Suzuyo Shimizu FC Lovely Ladies; Nikko Securities Dream Ladies

Statistics of Empress's Cup in the 1997 season.

== Overview ==
It was contested by 20 teams, and Yomiuri-Seiyu Beleza won the championship.

== Results ==
=== 1st round ===
- Kochi JFC Rosa 0-7 Shiroki FC Serena
- Mothers Kumamoto Rainbow 1-0 YKK Tohoku LSC Flappers
- Matsushita Electric Panasonic Ragazza 4-1 Sapporo Linda
- Takarazuka Bunnys 4-1 Nippon Sport Science University

=== 2nd round ===
- Nawashiro Ladies 0-4 OKI FC Winds
- Tasaki Perule FC 9-0 AS Elfen FC
- Shimizudaihachi SC 0-6 Fujita SC Mercury
- Matsushita Electric Panasonic Bambina 13-0 Scramble FC
- Yomiuri-Seiyu Beleza 4-1 Shiroki FC Serena
- Mothers Kumamoto Rainbow 0-5 Suzuyo Shimizu FC Lovely Ladies
- Nikko Securities Dream Ladies 10-0 Matsushita Electric Panasonic Ragazza
- Takarazuka Bunnys 1-2 Prima Ham FC Kunoichi

=== Quarterfinals ===
- Yomiuri-Seiyu Beleza 2-0 OKI FC Winds
- Tasaki Perule FC 0-3 Suzuyo Shimizu FC Lovely Ladies
- Nikko Securities Dream Ladies 3-0 Fujita SC Mercury
- Matsushita Electric Panasonic Bambina 1-5 Prima Ham FC Kunoichi

=== Semifinals ===
- Yomiuri-Seiyu Beleza 3-0 Suzuyo Shimizu FC Lovely Ladies
- Nikko Securities Dream Ladies 2-2 (pen 2-4) Prima Ham FC Kunoichi

=== Final ===
- Yomiuri-Seiyu Beleza 1-0 Prima Ham FC Kunoichi

Yomiuri-Seiyu Beleza won the championship.
