= 1982 Empress's Cup =

Tournament details
- Country: Japan

Final positions
- Champions: Shimizudaihachi SC
- Runners-up: FC Jinnan
- Semifinalists: Takatsuki FC; FC Kodaira

Statistics of Empress's Cup in the 1982 season.

== Overview ==
It was contested by 12 teams, and Shimizudaihachi SC won the championship.

== Results ==
=== 1st Round ===
- IMO SC 0-2 Shimizu FC Mama
- Chiba Gakuen High School 0-5 FC PAF
- Nishiyama Club 4-0 Molten Habatake
- Kobe FC 10-0 Hiroshima Oko FC

=== Quarterfinals ===
- FC Jinnan 6-0 Shimizu FC Mama
- Takatsuki FC 2-0 FC PAF
- Nishiyama Club 1-1 (pen 0–2) FC Kodaira
- Kobe FC 0-4 Shimizudaihachi SC

=== Semifinals ===
- FC Jinnan 1-0 Takatsuki FC
- FC Kodaira 0-6 Shimizudaihachi SC

=== Final ===
- FC Jinnan 0-6 Shimizudaihachi SC

Shimizudaihachi SC won the championship.
