= 1991 Empress's Cup final =

1991 Empress's Cup Final
- Event: 1991 Empress's Cup
Suzuyo Shimizu FC Lovely Ladies	Yomiuri SC Beleza
3	1
- Date: March 26, 1992
- Venue: Nishigaoka Soccer Stadium, Tokyo

The 1991 Empress's Cup Final was the 13th final of the Empress's Cup competition. The final was played at Nishigaoka Soccer Stadium in Tokyo on March 26, 1992. Suzuyo Shimizu FC Lovely Ladies won the championship, defeating Yomiuri SC Beleza 3-1.

== Overview ==
Suzuyo Shimizu FC Lovely Ladies won their first title by defeating Yomiuri SC Beleza 3–1.

== Match details ==
March 26, 1992

Suzuyo Shimizu FC Lovely Ladies	3–1	Yomiuri SC Beleza
Player 1 (?); Player 2 (?); Player 3 (?)		Player 4 (?)

Nishigaoka Soccer Stadium

== See also ==
- 1991 Empress's Cup
