= 1988 Empress's Cup final =

1988 Empress's Cup Final
Yomiuri SC Beleza	Takatsuki FC
2	0
- Date: March 25, 1989
- Venue: National Stadium, Tokyo

1988 Empress's Cup Final was the 10th final of the Empress's Cup competition. The final was played at National Stadium in Tokyo on March 25, 1989. Yomiuri SC Beleza won the championship.

== Overview ==
Defending champion Yomiuri SC Beleza won their 2nd title, by defeating Takatsuki FC 2–0. Yomiuri SC Beleza won the title for 2 years in a row.

== Match details ==
March 25, 1989

Yomiuri SC Beleza	2-0	Takatsuki FC
? (?) ? (?)

National Stadium

== See also ==
- 1988 Empress's Cup
