= 2005 Empress's Cup final =

2005 Empress's Cup Final
Nippon TV Beleza	Tasaki Perule FC
4	1
- Date: January 1, 2006
- Venue: National Stadium, Tokyo

2005 Empress's Cup Final was the 27th final of the Empress's Cup competition. The final was played at National Stadium in Tokyo on January 1, 2006. Nippon TV Beleza won the championship.

== Overview ==
Defending champion Nippon TV Beleza won their 7th title, by defeating Tasaki Perule FC 4–1 with Shinobu Ono, Eriko Arakawa and Yuki Nagasato goal.

== Match details ==
January 1, 2006

Nippon TV Beleza	4-1	Tasaki Perule FC
Shinobu Ono 44'; Eriko Arakawa 70'; Yuki Nagasato 75', 86'	Report	Tomoko Suzuki 63'

National Stadium

== See also ==
- 2005 Empress's Cup
