= 1992 Empress's Cup final =

1992 Empress's Cup Final
Nikko Securities Dream Ladies	Yomiuri Nippon SC Beleza
1	0
- Date: March 28, 1993
- Venue: Nishigaoka Soccer Stadium, Tokyo

1992 Empress's Cup Final was the 14th final of the Empress's Cup competition. The final was played at Nishigaoka Soccer Stadium in Tokyo on March 28, 1993. Nikko Securities Dream Ladies won the championship.

== Overview ==
Nikko Securities Dream Ladies won their 2nd title, by defeating Yomiuri Nippon SC Beleza 1–0.

== Match details ==
March 28, 1993

Nikko Securities Dream Ladies	1-0	Yomiuri Nippon SC Beleza
? (?)

Nishigaoka Soccer Stadium

== See also ==
- 1992 Empress's Cup
