= 1993 Empress's Cup =

Tournament details
- Country: Japan

Final positions
- Champions: Yomiuri Nippon SC Beleza
- Runners-up: Prima Ham FC Kunoichi
- Semifinalists: Shiroki FC Serena; Matsushita Electric LSC Bambina

Statistics of Empress's Cup in the 1993 season.

== Overview ==
It was contested by 20 teams, and Yomiuri Nippon SC Beleza won the championship.

== Results ==
=== 1st round ===
- Ota Gal 1-2 Fujita Tendai SC Mercury
- Urawa Motobuto 6-1 Ishinomaki Women's Commercial High School
- Shimizudaihachi SC 4-0 Sapporo Daiichi
- Matsushita Electric LSC Bambina 10-0 Ozu High School

=== 2nd round ===
- Yomiuri Nippon SC Beleza 3-0 Fujita Tendai SC Mercury
- Tasaki Perule FC 0-0 (pen 4–3) Tokyo Shidax LSC
- Shiroki FC Serena 6-0 Hatsukaichi High School
- Urawa Motobuto 0-7 Nissan FC
- Nikko Securities Dream Ladies 6-1 Shimizudaihachi SC
- Nawashiro Ladies 0-6 Prima Ham FC Kunoichi
- Asahi Kokusai Bunnys 1-0 Nippon Sport Science University
- Matsushita Electric LSC Bambina 1-1 (pen 4–3) Suzuyo Shimizu FC Lovely Ladies

=== Quarterfinals ===
- Yomiuri Nippon SC Beleza 5-1 Tasaki Perule FC
- Shiroki FC Serena 1-1 (pen 5–3) Nissan FC
- Nikko Securities Dream Ladies 0-2 Prima Ham FC Kunoichi
- Asahi Kokusai Bunnys 0-2 Matsushita Electric LSC Bambina

=== Semifinals ===
- Yomiuri Nippon SC Beleza 2-1 Shiroki FC Serena
- Prima Ham FC Kunoichi 1-0 Matsushita Electric LSC Bambina

=== Final ===
- Yomiuri Nippon SC Beleza 2-0 Prima Ham FC Kunoichi

Yomiuri Nippon SC Beleza won the championship.
