= 1984 Empress's Cup =

Tournament details
- Country: Japan

Final positions
- Champions: Shimizudaihachi SC
- Runners-up: Takatsuki FC
- Semifinalists: Yomiuri SC Beleza; FC Jinnan

Statistics of Empress's Cup in the 1984 season.

== Overview ==
It was contested by 16 teams, and Shimizudaihachi SC won the championship.

== Results ==
=== 1st Round ===
- Takatsuki FC 9-0 Miss Kick Kanazawa
- Yonan SC 4-1 Shizuoka Koki SC
- Kobe FC 5-0 Molten Habatake
- Aosaki LSC 0-9 Yomiuri SC Beleza
- Nishiyama Club 2-0 Miyagi Hirose High School
- Shimizu FC Mama 0-3 FC Jinnan
- FC Kodaira 4-0 Ryuhoku Club
- Uwajima Minami High School 0-12 Shimizudaihachi SC

=== Quarterfinals ===
- Takatsuki FC 0-0 (pen 5–4) Yonan SC
- Kobe FC 0-1 Yomiuri SC Beleza
- Nishiyama Club 0-0 (pen 1–2) FC Jinnan
- FC Kodaira 0-4 Shimizudaihachi SC

=== Semifinals ===
- Takatsuki FC 1-1 (pen 3–1) Yomiuri SC Beleza
- FC Jinnan 0-3 Shimizudaihachi SC

=== Final ===
- Takatsuki FC 0-4 Shimizudaihachi SC

Shimizudaihachi SC won the championship.
