= 1986 Empress's Cup final =

1986 Empress's Cup Final
Shimizudaihachi SC	Yomiuri SC Beleza
1	0
- Date: March 29, 1987
- Venue: National Stadium, Tokyo

1986 Empress's Cup Final was the 8th final of the Empress's Cup competition. The final was played at National Stadium in Tokyo on March 29, 1987. Shimizudaihachi SC won the championship.

== Overview ==
Defending champion Shimizudaihachi SC won their 7th title, by defeating Yomiuri SC Beleza 1–0. Shimizudaihachi SC won the title for 7 years in a row.

== Match details ==
March 29, 1987

Shimizudaihachi SC	1-0	Yomiuri SC Beleza
? ?'

National Stadium

== See also ==
- 1986 Empress's Cup
