= 1997 Empress's Cup final =

1997 Empress's Cup Final
Yomiuri-Seiyu Beleza	Prima Ham FC Kunoichi
1	0
- Date: January 18, 1998
- Venue: National Stadium, Tokyo

1997 Empress's Cup Final was the 19th final of the Empress's Cup competition. The final was played at National Stadium in Tokyo on January 18, 1998. Yomiuri-Seiyu Beleza won the championship.

== Overview ==
Yomiuri-Seiyu Beleza won their 4th title, by defeating Prima Ham FC Kunoichi 1–0.

== Match details ==
January 18, 1998

Yomiuri-Seiyu Beleza	1-0	Prima Ham FC Kunoichi
? (?)

National Stadium

== See also ==
- 1997 Empress's Cup
