= 1993 Empress's Cup final =

1993 Empress's Cup Final
Yomiuri Nippon SC Beleza	Prima Ham FC Kunoichi
2	0
- Date: March 27, 1994
- Venue: Nishigaoka Soccer Stadium, Tokyo

1993 Empress's Cup Final was the 15th final of the Empress's Cup competition. The final was played at Nishigaoka Soccer Stadium in Tokyo on March 27, 1994. Yomiuri Nippon SC Beleza won the championship.

== Overview ==
Yomiuri Nippon SC Beleza won their 3rd title, by defeating Prima Ham FC Kunoichi 2–0.

== Match details ==
March 27, 1994

Yomiuri Nippon SC Beleza	2-0	Prima Ham FC Kunoichi
? (?) ? (?)

Nishigaoka Soccer Stadium

== See also ==
- 1993 Empress's Cup
