= 1979 Empress's Cup =

Tournament details
- Country: Japan

Final positions
- Champions: FC Jinnan
- Runners-up: Takatsuki FC
- Semifinalists: Shimizu FC Mama; Shimizudaihachi SC

Statistics of Empress's Cup in the 1979 season.

== Overview ==
It was contested by 8 teams, and FC Jinnan won the championship.

== Results ==
=== Quarterfinals ===
- FC Jinnan 7-1 Nishiyama High School
- AC Plum 0-8 Shimizudaihachi SC
- Shimizu FC Mama 3-1 Mitsubishi Heavy Industries
- Jissen Women's University 0-3 Takatsuki FC

=== Semifinals ===
- FC Jinnan 2-1 Shimizudaihachi SC
- Shimizu FC Mama 0-5 Takatsuki FC

=== Final ===
- FC Jinnan 2-1 Takatsuki FC

FC Jinnan won the championship.
