= 1996 Empress's Cup final =

1996 Empress's Cup Final
| Nikko Securities Dream Ladies | Yomiuri-Seiyu Beleza |
| 3 | 0 |
- Date: January 19, 1997
- Venue: National Stadium, Tokyo

1996 Empress's Cup Final was the 18th final of the Empress's Cup competition. The final was played at National Stadium in Tokyo on January 19, 1997. Nikko Securities Dream Ladies won the championship.

== Overview ==
Nikko Securities Dream Ladies won their 3rd title, by defeating Yomiuri-Seiyu Beleza 3–0.

== Match details ==
January 19, 1997

| Nikko Securities Dream Ladies | 3-0 | Yomiuri-Seiyu Beleza |
|---|---|---|
| ? (?) ? (?) ? (?) |

National Stadium

== See also ==
- 1996 Empress's Cup
