= 1987 Empress's Cup final =

1987 Empress's Cup Final
| Yomiuri SC Beleza | Shimizudaihachi SC |
| 2 | 0 |
- Date: March 27, 1988
- Venue: National Stadium, Tokyo

1987 Empress's Cup Final was the 9th final of the Empress's Cup competition. The final was played at National Stadium in Tokyo on March 27, 1988. Yomiuri SC Beleza won the championship.

== Overview ==
Yomiuri SC Beleza won their 1st title, by defeating defending champion Shimizudaihachi SC 2–0.

== Match details ==
March 27, 1988

| Yomiuri SC Beleza | 2-0 | Shimizudaihachi SC |
|---|---|---|
| ? ?' ? ?' |

National Stadium

== See also ==
- 1987 Empress's Cup
