= 1998 Empress's Cup =

Tournament details
- Country: Japan

Final positions
- Champions: Prima Ham FC Kunoichi
- Runners-up: Nikko Securities Dream Ladies
- Semifinalists: Suzuyo Shimizu FC Lovely Ladies; Tasaki Perule FC

Statistics of Empress's Cup in the 1998 season.

== Overview ==
It was contested by 20 teams, and Prima Ham FC Kunoichi won the championship.

== Results ==
=== 1st round ===
- Yokosuka Seagulls FC 1-2 YKK Tohoku LSC Flappers
- Sapporo Linda 1-7 Matsushita Electric Panasonic Ragazza
- OKI FC Winds 2-0 Shimizudaihachi SC
- Scramble FC 0-5 Fujita SC Mercury

=== 2nd round ===
- Suzuyo Shimizu FC Lovely Ladies 11-0 Toyama Ladies SC
- YKK Tohoku LSC Flappers 0-4 Takarazuka Bunnys
- Prima Ham FC Kunoichi 7-1 Matsushita Electric Panasonic Ragazza
- Fukuoka First Lady Eleven 0-16 Matsushita Electric Panasonic Bambina
- Tasaki Perule FC 4-0 Nippon Sport Science University
- OKI FC Winds 1-5 Yomiuri Beleza
- Nikko Securities Dream Ladies 1-0 Fujita SC Mercury
- Socius Amigo 0-6 Shiroki FC Serena

=== Quarterfinals ===
- Nikko Securities Dream Ladies 3-0 Shiroki FC Serena
- Suzuyo Shimizu FC Lovely Ladies 3-1 Takarazuka Bunnys
- Prima Ham FC Kunoichi 3-0 Matsushita Electric Panasonic Bambina
- Tasaki Perule FC 2-1 Yomiuri Beleza

=== Semifinals ===
- Nikko Securities Dream Ladies 1-1 (pen 4–1) Suzuyo Shimizu FC Lovely Ladies
- Prima Ham FC Kunoichi 2-0 Tasaki Perule FC

=== Final ===
- Nikko Securities Dream Ladies 0-1 Prima Ham FC Kunoichi

Prima Ham FC Kunoichi won the championship.
