= 1994 Empress's Cup =

Tournament details
- Country: Japan

Final positions
- Champions: Prima Ham FC Kunoichi
- Runners-up: Nikko Securities Dream Ladies
- Semifinalists: Fujita Tendai SC Mercury; Yomiuri-Seiyu Beleza

Statistics of Empress's Cup in the 1994 season.

== Overview ==
It was contested by 20 teams, and Prima Ham FC Kunoichi won the championship.

== Results ==
=== 1st round ===
- Nippon Sport Science University 1-4 Urawa FC
- Toyama Ladies SC 1-2 Akita FC
- Socius Amigo 1-8 Seiwa Gakuen SC
- Asahi Kokusai Bunnys 2-1 Shimizudaihachi SC

=== 2nd round ===
- Matsushita Electric LSC Bambina 5-0 Urawa FC
- Hatsukaichi High School 0-6 Fujita Tendai SC Mercury
- Nikko Securities Dream Ladies 11-0 Sapporo Linda
- Akita FC 0-9 Suzuyo Shimizu FC Lovely Ladies
- Prima Ham FC Kunoichi 7-0 Seiwa Gakuen SC
- Tasaki Perule FC 2-0 Shiroki FC Serena
- Tokyo Shidax LSC 8-0 JEF United Ichihara
- Asahi Kokusai Bunnys 0-1 Yomiuri-Seiyu Beleza

=== Quarterfinals ===
- Matsushita Electric LSC Bambina 1-3 Fujita Tendai SC Mercury
- Nikko Securities Dream Ladies 1-0 Suzuyo Shimizu FC Lovely Ladies
- Prima Ham FC Kunoichi 3-0 Tasaki Perule FC
- Tokyo Shidax LSC 0-4 Yomiuri-Seiyu Beleza

=== Semifinals ===
- Fujita Tendai SC Mercury 1-2 Nikko Securities Dream Ladies
- Prima Ham FC Kunoichi 1-0 Yomiuri-Seiyu Beleza

=== Final ===
- Nikko Securities Dream Ladies 1-4 Prima Ham FC Kunoichi

Prima Ham FC Kunoichi won the championship.
