= 1991 Empress's Cup =

Tournament details
- Country: Japan

Final positions
- Champions: Shimizu FC Ladies
- Runners-up: Yomiuri SC Beleza
- Semifinalists: Nissan FC; Prima Ham FC Kunoichi

Statistics of Empress's Cup in the 1991 season.

== Overview ==
It was contested by 20 teams, and Suzuyo Shimizu FC Lovely Ladies won the championship.

== Results ==
=== 1st round ===
- Toyama Ladies SC 0-3 Fujita Tendai SC Mercury
- Ishinomaki Women's Commercial High School 1-0 Osaka University of Health and Sport Sciences
- Ube Super Ladies 0-4 Ozu High School
- Matsushita Electric LSC Bambina 0-0 (pen 3–0) Shiroki FC Serena

=== 2nd round ===
- Yomiuri SC Beleza 3-0 Fujita Tendai SC Mercury
- Sagamihara LSC 1-2 Asahi Kokusai Bunnys
- Nissan FC 11-0 Shibecha Ladies
- Ishinomaki Women's Commercial High School 0-5 Nikko Securities Dream Ladies
- Prima Ham FC Kunoichi 7-0 Ozu High School
- Uwajima Minami High School 0-2 Tasaki Kobe
- Shinko Seiko FC Clair 0-0 (pen 4–2) Nippon Sport Science University
- Matsushita Electric LSC Bambina 0-3 Suzuyo Shimizu FC Lovely Ladies

=== Quarterfinals ===
- Yomiuri SC Beleza 3-0 Asahi Kokusai Bunnys
- Nissan FC 2-1 Nikko Securities Dream Ladies
- Prima Ham FC Kunoichi 3-1 Tasaki Kobe
- Shinko Seiko FC Clair 0-5 Suzuyo Shimizu FC Lovely Ladies

=== Semifinals ===
- Yomiuri SC Beleza 4-0 Nissan FC
- Prima Ham FC Kunoichi 0-1 Suzuyo Shimizu FC Lovely Ladies

=== Final ===
- Suzuyo Shimizu FC Lovely Ladies 3-1 Yomiuri SC Beleza

Suzuyo Shimizu FC Lovely Ladies won the championship.
