= 1983 Empress's Cup =

Tournament details
- Country: Japan

Final positions
- Champions: Shimizudaihachi SC
- Runners-up: Takatsuki FC
- Semifinalists: FC Jinnan; Yomiuri SC Beleza

Statistics of Empress's Cup in the 1983 season.

== Overview ==
It was contested by 16 teams, and Shimizudaihachi SC won the championship.

== Results ==
=== 1st Round ===
- FC Jinnan 8-0 Mikaho Reebons
- Takakura Junior High School 4-0 Fujieda Sisters FC
- FC Kodaira 7-0 Shimizu FC Mama
- Chiba Gakuen High School 0-4 Takatsuki FC
- Yomiuri SC Beleza 5-0 Uwajima Minami High School
- Mitsubishi Heavy Industries 0-4 Kobe FC
- Nishiyama Club 4-0 Ichinomiya Graces
- Ryuhoku Club 0-10 Shimizudaihachi SC

=== Quarterfinals ===
- FC Jinnan 3-0 Takakura Junior High School
- FC Kodaira 0-3 Takatsuki FC
- Yomiuri SC Beleza 4-3 Kobe FC
- Nishiyama Club 0-4 Shimizudaihachi SC

=== Semifinals ===
- FC Jinnan 0-1 Takatsuki FC
- Yomiuri SC Beleza 0-5 Shimizudaihachi SC

=== Final ===
- Takatsuki FC 0-2 Shimizudaihachi SC

Shimizudaihachi SC won the championship.
