= 1987 Empress's Cup =

Tournament details
- Country: Japan

Final positions
- Champions: Yomiuri SC Beleza
- Runners-up: Shimizudaihachi SC
- Semifinalists: Kobe FC; Takatsuki FC

Statistics of Empress's Cup in the 1987 season.

== Overview ==
It was contested by 16 teams, and Yomiuri SC Beleza won the championship.

== Results ==
=== 1st Round ===
- Shimizudaihachi SC 3-0 Ladies Saijo
- Nissan FC 3-0 Hyogo University of Teacher Education
- FC Kodaira 7-0 Hiroshima Minami FC
- Shimizu FC 0-3 Kobe FC
- Takatsuki FC 1-0 Miyagi Hirose Club
- Tendai FC 0-0 (pen 2–3) Iga-Ueno Kunoichi SC
- Kumamoto Akita 4-0 FC Atletica
- Ota Gal 0-5 Yomiuri SC Beleza

=== Quarterfinals ===
- Shimizudaihachi SC 2-2 (pen 3–2) Nissan FC
- FC Kodaira 0-2 Kobe FC
- Takatsuki FC 1-0 Iga-Ueno Kunoichi SC
- Kumamoto Akita 0-11 Yomiuri SC Beleza

=== Semifinals ===
- Shimizudaihachi SC 2-1 Kobe FC
- Takatsuki FC 0-1 Yomiuri SC Beleza

=== Final ===
- Shimizudaihachi SC 0-2 Yomiuri SC Beleza

Yomiuri SC Beleza won the championship.
