= 1981 Empress's Cup =

Tournament details
- Country: Japan

Final positions
- Champions: Shimizudaihachi SC
- Runners-up: FC PAF
- Semifinalists: FC Jinnan; Takatsuki SC

Statistics of Empress's Cup in the 1981 season.

== Overview ==
It was contested by 8 teams, and Shimizudaihachi SC won the championship.

== Results ==
=== Quarterfinals ===
- FC Jinnan 2-0 Nagoya LFC
- FC PAF 2-1 Nishiyama High School
- Takatsuki FC 3-0 Yowa Ladies
- Kobe FC 0-5 Shimizudaihachi SC

=== Semifinals ===
- FC Jinnan 0-0 (pen 1–2) FC PAF
- Takatsuki FC 0-3 Shimizudaihachi SC

=== Final ===
- FC PAF 0-6 Shimizudaihachi SC

Shimizudaihachi SC won the championship.
