= 1980 Empress's Cup =

Tournament details
- Country: Japan

Final positions
- Champions: Shimizudaihachi SC
- Runners-up: FC Jinnan
- Semifinalists: Kobe FC; Takatsuki SC

The Empress's Cup was a Japanese Woman's football competition that took place during the 1980 season.

== Overview ==
Eight teams participated in the event, and Shimizudaihachi SC won the championship.

== Results ==
=== Quarterfinals ===
- FC Jinnan 2-0 Nishiyama High School
- Kobe FC 2-1 Shimizu FC Mama
- Shimizudaihachi SC 4-0 Yowa Ladies
- Motohachi SS Mothers 0-12 Takatsuki FC

=== Semifinals ===
- FC Jinnan 3-0 Kobe FC
- Shimizudaihachi SC 1-0 Takatsuki FC

=== Final ===
- FC Jinnan 0-2 Shimizudaihachi SC

Shimizudaihachi SC won the championship.
