= 2011 Empress's Cup final =

2011 Empress's Cup Final
INAC Kobe Leonessa	Albirex Niigata
3	0
- Date: January 1, 2012
- Venue: National Stadium, Tokyo

2011 Empress's Cup Final was the 33rd final of the Empress's Cup competition. The final was played at National Stadium in Tokyo on January 1, 2012. INAC Kobe Leonessa won the championship.

== Overview ==
INAC Kobe Leonessa won their second title by defeating Albirex Niigata – with Chiaki Minamiyama, Megumi Takase and Asuna Tanaka goal. This was the second consecutive win for INAC Kobe Leonessa.

== Match details ==
January 1, 2012

INAC Kobe Leonessa	3-0	Albirex Niigata
Chiaki Minamiyama 44'; Megumi Takase 51'; Asuna Tanaka 70'	Report

National Stadium

== See also ==
- 2011 Empress's Cup
