= 2012 Empress's Cup final =

2012 Empress's Cup Final
INAC Kobe Leonessa	JEF United Chiba
1	0
- Date: December 24, 2012
- Venue: Omiya Football Stadium, Saitama

2012 Empress's Cup Final was the 34th final of the Empress's Cup competition. The final was played at Omiya Football Stadium in Saitama on December 24, 2012. INAC Kobe Leonessa won the championship.

== Overview ==
Defending champion INAC Kobe Leonessa won their 3rd title, by defeating JEF United Chiba – with Asuna Tanaka goal. INAC Kobe Leonessa won the title for 3 years in a row.

== Match details ==
December 24, 2012

INAC Kobe Leonessa	1-0	JEF United Chiba
Asuna Tanaka 90+2'	Report

Omiya Football Stadium

== See also ==
- 2012 Empress's Cup
