= 2013 Empress's Cup final =

2013 Empress's Cup Final
INAC Kobe Leonessa	Albirex Niigata
2	2
- INAC Kobe won 4–3 on penalties
- Date: December 23, 2013
- Venue: Omiya Football Stadium, Saitama

2013 Empress's Cup Final was the 35th final of the Empress's Cup competition. The final was played at Omiya Football Stadium in Saitama on December 23, 2013. INAC Kobe Leonessa won the championship.

== Overview ==
Defending champion INAC Kobe Leonessa won their 4th title, by defeating Albirex Niigata on a penalty shoot-out. INAC Kobe Leonessa won the title for 4 years in a row.

== Match details ==
December 23, 2013

INAC Kobe Leonessa	2-2 (pen 4-3)	Albirex Niigata
Yukari Kinga 65'; Ji So-yun 93'	Report	Tiffany McCarty 42', 111'

Omiya Football Stadium

== See also ==
- 2013 Empress's Cup
