= 2016 Empress's Cup final =

2016 Empress's Cup Final
| INAC Kobe Leonessa | Albirex Niigata |
| 0 | 0 |
- INAC Kobe won 5–4 on penalties
- Date: December 25, 2016
- Venue: Chiba Soga Football Stadium, Chiba

2016 Empress's Cup Final was the 38th final of the Empress's Cup competition. The final was played at Chiba Soga Football Stadium in Chiba on December 25, 2016. INAC Kobe Leonessa won the championship.

== Overview ==
INAC Kobe Leonessa won their sixth title, by defeating Albirex Niigata on a penalty shoot-out. INAC Kobe Leonessa won the title two consecutive years.

== Match details ==
December 25, 2016

| INAC Kobe Leonessa | 0–0 (pen 5–4) | Albirex Niigata |
|---|---|---|
| | Report |

Chiba Soga Football Stadium

== See also ==
- 2016 Empress's Cup
