= 2003 Empress's Cup final =

2003 Empress's Cup Final
Tasaki Perule FC	Nippon TV Beleza
2	2
- Tasaki Purule won 5–3 on penalties
- Date: January 25, 2004
- Venue: National Stadium, Tokyo

2003 Empress's Cup Final was the 25th final of the Empress's Cup competition. The final was played at National Stadium in Tokyo on January 25, 2004. Tasaki Perule FC won the championship.

== Overview ==
Defending champion Tasaki Perule FC won their 3rd title, by defeating Nippon TV Beleza on a penalty shoot-out. Tasaki Perule FC won the title for 2 years in a row.

== Match details ==
January 25, 2004

Tasaki Perule FC	2-2 (pen 5-3)	Nippon TV Beleza
? 31'; Emi Yamamoto 37'		Nayuha Toyoda 37'; Shinobu Ono 88'

National Stadium

== See also ==
- 2003 Empress's Cup
