= 2002 Empress's Cup final =

2002 Empress's Cup Final
Tasaki Perule FC	Nippon TV Beleza
1	0
- Date: January 26, 2003
- Venue: National Stadium, Tokyo

2002 Empress's Cup Final was the 24th final of the Empress's Cup competition. The final was played at National Stadium in Tokyo on January 26, 2003. Tasaki Perule FC won the championship.

== Overview ==
Tasaki Perule FC won their 2nd title, by defeating Nippon TV Beleza 1–0 with Mio Otani goal.

== Match details ==
January 26, 2003

Tasaki Perule FC	1-0	Nippon TV Beleza
Mio Otani 82'

National Stadium

== See also ==
- 2002 Empress's Cup
