= 2012 Empress's Cup =

Tournament details
- Country: Japan

Final positions
- Champions: INAC Kobe Leonessa
- Runners-up: JEF United Chiba
- Semifinalists: Iga FC Kunoichi; Urawa Reds

Statistics of Empress's Cup in the 2012 season.

== Overview ==
It was contested by 32 teams, and INAC Kobe Leonessa won the championship.

== Results ==
=== 1st round ===
- Fukui University of Technology Fukui High School 0-3 Waseda University
- Japan Soccer College 3-1 Seiwa Gakuen High School
- JFA Academy Fukushima 2-1 Shizuoka Sangyo University
- Ehime FC 2-3 Nippon Sport Science University
- Nojima Stella Kanagawa 4-1 Melsa Kumamoto FC
- Himeji Dokkyo University 0-1 Kamimura Gakuen High School
- Kanto Gakuen University 4-2 Sakuyo High School
- Niigata University of Health and Welfare 1-3 Fujieda Junshin High School

=== 2nd round ===
- Hokkaido Otani Muroran High School 1-5 Waseda University
- Japan Soccer College 0-1 AS Elfen Sayama FC
- Osaka University of Health and Sport Sciences 0-3 JFA Academy Fukushima
- Nippon Sport Science University 0-6 Vegalta Sendai
- Kochi ganador FC 0-10 Nojima Stella Kanagawa
- Kamimura Gakuen High School 2-1 Kibi International University
- Fukuoka J. Anclas 2-1 Kanto Gakuen University
- Fujieda Junshin High School 0-2 Tokiwagi Gakuken High School

=== 3rd round ===
- INAC Kobe Leonessa 1-0 Waseda University
- AS Elfen Sayama FC 2-1 Speranza FC Takatsuki
- Albirex Niigata 1-2 JFA Academy Fukushima
- Vegalta Sendai 0-2 Urawa Reds
- Okayama Yunogo Belle 9-0 Nojima Stella Kanagawa
- Kamimura Gakuen High School 0-6 Iga FC Kunoichi
- JEF United Chiba 4-0 Fukuoka J. Anclas
- Tokiwagi Gakuken High School 0-6 Nippon TV Beleza

=== Quarterfinals ===
- INAC Kobe Leonessa 4-0 AS Elfen Sayama FC
- JEF United Chiba 2-2 (pen 4–2) Nippon TV Beleza
- JFA Academy Fukushima 0-3 Urawa Reds
- Okayama Yunogo Belle 1-2 Iga FC Kunoichi

=== Semifinals ===
- Iga FC Kunoichi 1-1 (pen 3–4) JEF United Chiba
- INAC Kobe Leonessa 1-0 Urawa Reds

=== Final ===
- INAC Kobe Leonessa 1-0 JEF United Chiba

INAC Kobe Leonessa won the championship.
