= 1986 Empress's Cup =

Tournament details
- Country: Japan

Final positions
- Champions: Shimizudaihachi SC
- Runners-up: Yomiuri SC Beleza
- Semifinalists: Kobe FC; Takatsuki FC

Statistics of Empress's Cup in the 1986 season.

== Overview ==
It was contested by 16 teams, and Shimizudaihachi SC won the championship.

== Results ==
=== 1st Round ===
- Shimizudaihachi SC 5-0 Miyagi Hirose Club
- Kumamoto Akita 2-1 Tendai FC
- Chigasaki Kowada FC 0-2 Kusunoki SC
- Toyama Ladies SC 0-4 Kobe FC
- Nissan FC 9-0 Mikaho Reebons
- Iga-Ueno Kunoichi SC 0-3 Takatsuki FC
- Yomiuri SC Beleza 9-0 Yonago Cosmos
- Ota Gal 1-2 Nishiyama Club

=== Quarterfinals ===
- Shimizudaihachi SC 7-0 Kumamoto Akita
- Kusunoki SC 0-4 Kobe FC
- Nissan FC 1-2 Takatsuki FC
- Yomiuri SC Beleza 3-0 Nishiyama Club

=== Semifinals ===
- Shimizudaihachi SC 2-0 Kobe FC
- Takatsuki FC 0-2 Yomiuri SC Beleza

=== Final ===
- Shimizudaihachi SC 1-0 Yomiuri SC Beleza

Shimizudaihachi SC won the championship.
