= 2000 Empress's Cup final =

2000 Empress's Cup Final
Nippon TV Beleza	Tasaki Perule FC
2	1
- Date: January 21, 2001
- Venue: National Stadium, Tokyo

2000 Empress's Cup Final was the 22nd final of the Empress's Cup competition. The final was played at National Stadium in Tokyo on January 21, 2001. Nippon TV Beleza won the championship.

== Overview ==
Nippon TV Beleza won their 5th title, by defeating defending champion Tasaki Perule FC 2–1.

== Match details ==
January 21, 2001

Nippon TV Beleza	2-1	Tasaki Perule FC
? (?) ? (?)		? (?)

National Stadium

== See also ==
- 2000 Empress's Cup
