= 2006 Empress's Cup =

Tournament details
- Country: Japan

Final positions
- Champions: Tasaki Perule FC
- Runners-up: Okayama Yunogo Belle
- Semifinalists: Nippon TV Beleza; Urawa Reds

Statistics of Empress's Cup in the 2006 season.

== Overview ==
It was contested by 32 teams, and Tasaki Perule FC won the championship.

== Results ==
=== 1st round ===
- Nagoya FC 0-3 Kibi International University
- FC Adooma 0-4 Waseda University
- Libelta Tokushima FC 0-6 Kagoshima Kamoike FC Asahina
- Kamimura Gakuen High School 3-1 Kanagawa University
- FC Re've 0-14 Hinomoto Gakuen High School
- Osaka University of Health and Sport Sciences 2-1 Seiwa Gakuen High School
- Fujieda Junshin High School 1-0 Fukui University of Technology Fukui High School
- Nippon TV Menina 3-2 Tokiwagi Gakuken High School

=== 2nd round ===
- Renaissance Kumamoto FC 0-2 Kibi International University
- Waseda University 1-0 Albirex Niigata
- JEF United Chiba 6-0 Kagoshima Kamoike FC Asahina
- Kamimura Gakuen High School 0-2 AS Elfen Sayama FC
- Bunnys Kyoto SC 3-2 Hinomoto Gakuen High School
- Osaka University of Health and Sport Sciences 1-4 Fukuoka J. Anclas
- Ohara Gakuen JaSRA 5-0 Fujieda Junshin High School
- Nippon TV Menina 2-0 Shimizudaihachi SC

=== 3rd round ===
- Nippon TV Beleza 9-0 Kibi International University
- Waseda University 0-2 TEPCO Mareeze
- INAC Leonessa 4-1 JEF United Chiba
- AS Elfen Sayama FC 1-2 Okayama Yunogo Belle
- Tasaki Perule FC 6-1 Bunnys Kyoto SC
- Fukuoka J. Anclas 2-3 Iga FC Kunoichi
- Speranza FC Takatsuki 0-2 Ohara Gakuen JaSRA
- Nippon TV Menina 0-4 Urawa Reds

=== Quarterfinals ===
- Nippon TV Beleza 4-0 TEPCO Mareeze
- INAC Leonessa 1-1 (pen 3-5) Okayama Yunogo Belle
- Tasaki Perule FC 2-0 Iga FC Kunoichi
- Ohara Gakuen JaSRA 0-4 Urawa Reds

=== Semifinals ===
- Nippon TV Beleza 0-1 Okayama Yunogo Belle
- Tasaki Perule FC 2-2 (pen 4-3) Urawa Reds

=== Final ===
- Okayama Yunogo Belle 0-2 Tasaki Perule FC

Tasaki Perule FC won the championship.
