= 2007 Empress's Cup final =

2007 Empress's Cup Final
Nippon TV Beleza	Tasaki Perule FC
2	0
- Date: January 1, 2008
- Venue: National Stadium, Tokyo

2007 Empress's Cup Final was the 29th final of the Empress's Cup competition. The final was played at National Stadium in Tokyo on January 1, 2008. Nippon TV Beleza won the championship.

== Overview ==
Nippon TV Beleza won their 8th title, by defeating defending champion Tasaki Perule FC – with Homare Sawa and Eriko Arakawa goal.

== Match details ==
January 1, 2008

Nippon TV Beleza	2-0	Tasaki Perule FC
Homare Sawa 32'; Eriko Arakawa 86'	Report

National Stadium

== See also ==
- 2007 Empress's Cup
