= 2014 Empress's Cup final =

2014 Empress's Cup Final
Nippon TV Beleza	Urawa Reds
1	0
- Date: January 1, 2015
- Venue: Tokyo Stadium, Tokyo

2014 Empress's Cup Final was the 36th final of the Empress's Cup competition. The final was played at Tokyo Stadium in Tokyo on January 1, 2015. Nippon TV Beleza won the championship.

== Overview ==
Nippon TV Beleza won their 11th title, by defeating Urawa Reds 1–0 with Mina Tanaka goal.

== Match details ==
January 1, 2015

Nippon TV Beleza	1-0	Urawa Reds
Mina Tanaka 19'	Report

Tokyo Stadium

== See also ==
- 2014 Empress's Cup
