= 2009 Empress's Cup final =

2009 Empress's Cup Final
Nippon TV Beleza	Urawa Reds
2	0
- Date: January 1, 2010
- Venue: National Stadium, Tokyo

2009 Empress's Cup Final was the 31st final of the Empress's Cup competition. The final was played at National Stadium in Tokyo on January 1, 2010. Nippon TV Beleza won the championship.

== Overview ==
Defending champion Nippon TV Beleza won their 10th title, by defeating Urawa Reds 2–0 with Shinobu Ono and Homare Sawa goal. Nippon TV Beleza won the title for 3 years in a row.

== Match details ==
January 1, 2010

Nippon TV Beleza	2-0	Urawa Reds
Shinobu Ono 49'; Homare Sawa 77'	Report

National Stadium

== See also ==
- 2009 Empress's Cup
