= 2001 Empress's Cup =

Tournament details
- Country: Japan

Final positions
- Champions: Iga FC Kunoichi
- Runners-up: Tasaki Perule FC
- Semifinalists: Nippon TV Beleza; YKK Tohoku LSC Flappers

Statistics of Empress's Cup in the 2001 season.

== Overview ==
It was contested by 20 teams, and Iga FC Kunoichi won the championship.

== Results ==
=== 1st round ===
- Fujimi FC Angels 1-2 Hokkaido Bunkyo University Meisei High School
- Ohara Gakuen JaSRA 2-1 Tokyo Women's College of Physical Education
- Saibi High School 0-6 Kyoto Shiko SC
- Fukuoka Jogakuin FC Anclas 1-3 Seiwa Gakuen High School

=== 2nd round ===
- Nippon TV Beleza 12-0 Hokkaido Bunkyo University Meisei High School
- JEF United Ichihara 1-2 Takarazuka Bunnys
- Urawa Reinas FC 5-0 Hiroshima Minami High School
- Ohara Gakuen JaSRA 0-6 Iga FC Kunoichi
- YKK Tohoku LSC Flappers 3-0 Kyoto Shiko SC
- AS Elfen FC 0-3 Shimizudaihachi SC
- Speranza FC Takatsuki 4-0 Renaissance Kumamoto FC
- Seiwa Gakuen High School 0-10 Tasaki Perule FC

=== Quarterfinals ===
- Nippon TV Beleza 4-0 Takarazuka Bunnys
- Urawa Reinas FC 0-1 Iga FC Kunoichi
- YKK Tohoku LSC Flappers 4-1 Shimizudaihachi SC
- Speranza FC Takatsuki 0-3 Tasaki Perule FC

=== Semifinals ===
- Nippon TV Beleza 1-2 Iga FC Kunoichi
- YKK Tohoku LSC Flappers 1-3 Tasaki Perule FC

=== Final ===
- Iga FC Kunoichi 2-1 Tasaki Perule FC

Iga FC Kunoichi won the championship.
