= 2004 Empress's Cup final =

2004 Empress's Cup Final
Nippon TV Beleza	Saitama Reinas FC
3	1
- Date: January 1, 2005
- Venue: National Stadium, Tokyo

2004 Empress's Cup Final was the 26th final of the Empress's Cup competition. The final was played at National Stadium in Tokyo on January 1, 2005. Nippon TV Beleza won the championship.

== Overview ==
Nippon TV Beleza won their 6th title, by defeating Saitama Reinas FC 3–1 with Eriko Arakawa and Shinobu Ono goal.

== Match details ==
January 1, 2005

Nippon TV Beleza	3-1	Saitama Reinas FC
Eriko Arakawa 2'; Shinobu Ono 16', 23'		? 51'

National Stadium

== See also ==
- 2004 Empress's Cup
