= 1999 Empress's Cup =

Tournament details
- Country: Japan

Final positions
- Champions: Tasaki Perule FC
- Runners-up: Prima Ham FC Kunoichi
- Semifinalists: Matsushita Electric Panasonic Bambina; NTV Beleza

Statistics of Empress's Cup in the 1999 season.

== Overview ==
It was contested by 18 teams, and Tasaki Perule FC won the championship.

== Results ==
=== 1st round ===
- JEF United Ichihara 1-3 YKK Tohoku LSC Flappers
- Osaka University of Health and Sport Sciences 4-2 NTV Menina

=== 2nd round ===
- Prima Ham FC Kunoichi 3-0 YKK Tohoku LSC Flappers
- Urawa Reinas FC 3-1 Sapporo Linda
- OKI FC Winds 5-0 Toyama Ladies SC
- Matsushita Electric Panasonic Bambina 11-0 Hiroshima Oko FC
- NTV Beleza 16-0 Socius Amigo
- Takarazuka Bunnys 1-0 Fukuoka Jogakuin FC
- Nippon Sport Science University 0-1 Suzuyo Shimizu FC Lovely Ladies
- Osaka University of Health and Sport Sciences 0-4 Tasaki Perule FC

=== Quarterfinals ===
- Prima Ham FC Kunoichi 5-0 Urawa Reinas FC
- OKI FC Winds 1-3 Matsushita Electric Panasonic Bambina
- NTV Beleza 3-1 Takarazuka Bunnys
- Suzuyo Shimizu FC Lovely Ladies 0-2 Tasaki Perule FC

=== Semifinals ===
- Prima Ham FC Kunoichi 6-0 Matsushita Electric Panasonic Bambina
- NTV Beleza 1-1 (pen 3-4) Tasaki Perule FC

=== Final ===
- Prima Ham FC Kunoichi 0-0 (pen 2-4) Tasaki Perule FC

Tasaki Perule FC won the championship.
