= FC PAF =

F.C. PAF
- Full name: F.C. PAF
- Nickname: F.C. PAF
- Founded: 1980
- Website: https://www.fcpaf.join-us.jp/pc/index.html

F.C. PAF is a women's football team in Japan.

== Honors ==
=== Domestic competitions ===
- Empress's Cup All-Japan Women's Football Tournament
  - Runners-up (1) : 1981

== Results ==
Season	Domestic League			National Cup	League Cup
Season	Level	Place	Tms.	National Cup	League Cup
1981	3	2nd		Runners-up	-
1982	3	2nd		Quarter-finals	-
1983	3	5th		-	-
1984	3	6th		-	-
1985	3	7th		-	-
1986	3	4th		-	-
1987	3	4th		-	-
1988	3	4th		1st Stage	-
1989	3	7th		-	-
1990	3	2nd		-	-
1991	3	6th		-	-
1992	3	3rd		-	-
1993	3	2nd		-	-
1994	3	4th		-	-
1995	4	3rd		-	-
1996	4	2nd		-	-
1997	4	1st		-	-
1998	4	2nd		-	-
1999	3	3rd		-	-
2000	4	1st		-	-
2001	3	3rd		-	-
2002	3	4th		-	-
2003	3	4th	8	-	-
2004	3	5th	8	-	-
2005	3	7th	8	-	-
2006	4	2nd	10	-	-
2007	4	5th	10	-	-
2008	4	1st	9	-	-
2009	3	6th	8	-	-
2010	3	6th	8	-	-
2011	3	6th	8	-	-
2012	3	8th	8	-	-
2013	4		10	-	-
