= OKI FC Winds =

- Full name: OKI FC Winds
- Nickname: OKI FC
- Founded: 1990

OKI FC Winds was a womens football team which played in Division 1 of Japan's Nadeshiko League. The team was based in Honjō, Saitama Prefecture. It joined the league back in 1994. The club was disbanded in 1999.

== Results ==
Season	Domestic League				National Cup	League Cup	League Note
Season	League	Level	Place	Tms.	National Cup	League Cup	League Note
1992	JLSL Challenge	2	4th	4	DNQ	-	
1993	JLSL Challenge	2	4th	4	DNQ	-	
1994	JLSL Challenge	2	3rd	3	DNQ	-	
1995	JLSL Challenge	2	1st	3	1st Stage	-	Promoted for Div.1
1996	L	1	10th	10	2nd Stage	Group League	1st Stage : 10th / 2nd Stage : 10th
1997	L	1	8th	10	Quarter-finals	Group League	1st Stage : 8th / 2nd Stage : 8th
1998	L	1	8th	10	2nd Stage	Semi-finals	1st Stage : 9th / 2nd Stage : 9th
1999	L	1	4th	10	Quarter-finals	Semi-finals(3rd)	1st Stage : 5th / 2nd Stage : 4th / Dissolved

== Transition of team name ==
- OKI Lady Thunders : 1990 - 1995
- OKI FC Winds : 1996 – 1999

== See also ==
- Japanese women's club teams
