= Kumamoto Renaissance FC =

Kumamoto Renaissance FC 熊本ルネサンスフットボールクラブ
- Full name: Kumamoto Renaissance Football Club
- Nickname(s): Kumamoto Renaissance
- Founded: 1983
- League: Kyushu.League / Div.4
- 2016: 2nd (Kyushu.League) Div.4
- Website: http://renaissance-kumamoto.com/
Home colours	Away colours

Kumamoto Renaissance FC (熊本ルネサンスフットボールクラブ) is a women's football club playing in Japan's football league, Q League. Its hometown is the city of Kumamoto.

== Squad ==
=== Current squad ===
As of 21 Feb. 2015 Note: Flags indicate national team as defined under FIFA eligibility rules; some limited exceptions apply. Players may hold more than one non-FIFA nationality.

No.	Pos.	Nation	Player
1	GK	(Japan) JPN	Natsuki Ushijima
2	MF	(Japan) JPN	Tomomi Mine
3	DF	(Japan) JPN	Erina Hamada
4	MF	(Japan) JPN	Arisa Kutsuna
5	DF	(Japan) JPN	Nozomi Terasawa
6	DF	(Japan) JPN	Miki Nakamura
8	MF	(Japan) JPN	NastumiKameoka (c)
9	MF	(Japan) JPN	Natsumi Hori
10	FW	(Japan) JPN	Eri Kimura

No.	Pos.	Nation	Player
11	FW	(Japan) JPN	Honami Kurahara
13	MF	(Japan) JPN	Mai Okuzono
14	DF	(Japan) JPN	Mika Iwamoto
15	MF	(Japan) JPN	Misato Kiyokawa
17	MF	(Japan) JPN	Eri Kouji
18	DF	(Japan) JPN	Minamo Kitagawa
19	FW	(Japan) JPN	Ayaka Yasuda
21	GK	(Japan) JPN	Mizuho Nakashima
23	DF	(Japan) JPN	Azusa Koshi

== Results ==
Season	Domestic League				National Cup	League Cup	League Note
Season	League	Level	Place	Tms.	National Cup	League Cup	League Note
1985	-	-	-	-	1st Stage	-	
1986	-	-	-	-	Quarter-finals	-	
1987	-	-	-	-	Quarter-finals	-	
1988	-	-	-	-	1st Stage	-	
1989	-	-	-	-	1st Stage	-	
1990	-	-	-	-	1st Stage	-	
1991	-	-	-	-	DNQ	-	
1992	-	-	-	-	DNQ	-	
1993	-	-	-	-	DNQ	-	
1994	-	-	-	-	2nd Stage	-	
1995	-	-	-	-	2nd Stage	-	
1996	-	-	-	-	1st Stage	-	
1997	-	-	-	-	2nd Stage	-	
1998	Kyushu	2	2nd	4	DNQ	-	
1999	Kyushu	2	2nd	5	DNQ	-	Promoted for L.League
2000	L	1	9th	9	2nd Stage	-	
2001	L	1	10th	10	2nd Stage	-	
2002	L	1	11th	11	2nd Stage	-	
2003	L	1	13th	13	1st Stage	-	Relegated to Div.2
2004	L2	2	4th	6	2nd Stage	-	
2005	L2	2	7th	7	1st Stage	-	
2006	Nadeshiko; Div.2	2	8th	8	2nd Stage	-	
2007	Nadeshiko; Div.2	2	8th	8	1st Stage	-	
2008	Nadeshiko; Div.2	2	9th	9	1st Stage	-	
2009	Nadeshiko; Div.2	2	8th	8	1st Stage	-	
2010	Challenge(West)	2	6th	6	1st Stage	-	Relegated to Regional League
2011	Kyushu Div.1	3	1st	7	2nd Stage	-	
2012	Kyushu	3	2nd	12	DNQ	-	
2013	Kyushu	3	1st	12	1st Stage	-	
2014	Kyushu	3	1st	13	DNQ	-	Promoted for L.League
2015	Challenge(West)	3	6th	6	DNQ	-	Relegated to Regional League
2016	Kyushu Div.1	4	2nd	9	2nd Stage	-	
2017	Kyushu Div.1	4		8	DNQ	-	

== Transition of team name ==
- Kumamoto Ladies Akita : 1983 -1988
- Akita FC Ladies : 1989 -1996
- Mothers Kumamoto Rainbow Ladies : 1997
- Renaissance Kumamoto FC : 1998 – 2010
- Mashiki Renaissance Kumamoto FC : 2011 – 2016
- Kumamoto Renaissance FC : 2017 – Present
