= Shiroki FC Serena =

Shiroki FC Serena シロキFCセレーナ
- Full name: Shiroki FC Serena
- Nickname: Shiroki FC Serena
- Founded: 1991; 35 years ago
- Dissolved: 1998; 28 years ago

Shiroki FC Serena (シロキFCセレーナ) was a women's football team based in Toyokawa City, Aichi Prefecture, which played in Division 1 of Japan's Nadeshiko League. It founded the league back in 1993. The team dissolved in March 1998.

== Results ==
Season	Domestic League				National Cup	League Cup	League Note
Season	League	Level	Place	Tms.	National Cup	League Cup	League Note
1991	-	-	-	-	1st Stage	-	
1992	JLSL Challenge	2	1st	4	2nd Stage	-	
1993	JLSL	1	5th	10	Semi-finals	-	1st Stage : 5th / 2nd Stage : 5th
1994	L	1	6th	10	2nd Stage	-	1st Stage : 3rd / 2nd Stage : 9th
1995	L	1	7th	10	Quarter-finals	-	1st Stage : 4th / 2nd Stage : 8th
1996	L	1	8th	10	2nd Stage	Group League	1st Stage : 9th / 2nd Stage : 6th
1997	L	1	9th	10	2nd Stage	Group League	1st Stage : 10th / 2nd Stage : 7th
1998	L	1	10th	10	Quarter-finals	Group League	1st Stage : 8th / 2nd Stage : 10th / Dissolved

== See also ==
- Japanese women's club teams
