= Fujita SC Mercury =

Fujita SC Mercury フジタ・サッカークラブ・マーキュリー
- Full name: Fujita Soccer Club Mercury
- Nickname: Fujita S. C. Mercury
- Founded: 1990

Fujita Soccer Club Mercury (フジタ・サッカークラブ・マーキュリー) was a women's football team from Hiratsuka which played in Division 1 of Japan's Nadeshiko League. It founded the league back in 1989. The club was disbanded in 1999.

== History ==
The club was acquired in 1990 by Fujita Industries, parent company of the team that became Shonan Bellmare. The women's team was run directly by the company. In 1999, following the withdrawal of Fujita's support of the Bellmare club, the women's team was disbanded.

== Honors ==
=== Domestic competitions ===
- Empress's Cup All-Japan Women's Football Tournament
  - Champions (1) : 1995/96

== Results ==
Season	Domestic League				National Cup	League Cup	League Note
Season	League	Level	Place	Tms.	National Cup	League Cup	League Note
1991	JLSL	1	10th	10	2nd Stage	-	
1992	JLSL	1	8th	10	Quarter-finals	-	
1993	JLSL	1	10th	10	2nd Stage	-	1st Stage : 7th / 2nd Stage : 10th
1994	L	1	8th	10	Semi-finals	-	1st Stage : 8th / 2nd Stage : 6th
1995	L	1	6th	10	Champion	-	1st Stage : 7th / 2nd Stage : 6th
1996	L	1	9th	10	Quarter-finals	Group League	1st Stage : 8th / 2nd Stage : 8th
1997	L	1	7th	10	Quarter-finals	Group League	1st Stage : 6th / 2nd Stage : 9th
1998	L	1	9th	10	2nd Stage	Group League	1st Stage : 10th / 2nd Stage : 8th / Dissolved

== Transition of team name ==
- Fujita Tendai SC Mercury : 1990 - 1994
- Fujita SC Mercury : 1995 - 1999
