= Empress's Cup =

- Founded: 1979; 47 years ago
- Region: Japan (Asia)
- Teams: 48
- Current champions: Sanfrecce Hiroshima Regina (1st title)
- Most championships: Nippon TV Tokyo Verdy Beleza (16 titles)
- Broadcaster(s): NHK BS; JFATV
- Website: jfa.jp/eng/empressscup/
- 2025 Empress's Cup

The Empress's Cup All-Japan Women's Soccer Championship Tournament (皇后杯全日本女子サッカー選手権大会, Kōgōhai Zen Nippon Joshi Sakkaa Senshuken Taikai), since 2018 renamed "Empress's Cup JFA Japan Women's Football Championship" (Japanese: 皇后杯 JFA 全日本女子サッカー選手権大会) or The JFA Empress's Cup (from 2024 onwards), is a Japanese Women's football competition. As an elimination tournament, it can be considered the female counterpart to the men's Emperor's Cup in Japan. The name "Empress's Cup" has been used since the 2012 season as the Empress's Cup trophy was founded in that year.

From 2004 to 2011 season (New Year's Day of 2005 to 2012), the final was played on New Year's Day at the National Olympic Stadium in Tokyo before the Emperor's Cup final, and was regarded as the traditional closing match of the season. Since 2012, the final has been played separately from the Emperor's Cup final.

== Past winners ==
Past winners are:

Year	Winner	Result	Runners-up
1979 (Final)	F.C. Jinnan	2–1	Takatsuki F.C. Ladies
1980 (Final)	Shimizu Dai-hachi S.C.	2–0	F.C. Jinnan
1981 (Final)	Shimizu Dai-hachi S.C.	6–0	F.C. PAF
1982 (Final)	Shimizu Dai-hachi S.C.	6–0	F.C. Jinnan
1983 (Final)	Shimizu Dai-hachi S.C.	2–0	Takatsuki F.C. Ladies
1984 (Final)	Shimizu Dai-hachi S.C.	4–0	Takatsuki F.C. Ladies
1985 (Final)	Shimizu Dai-hachi S.C.	5–1	Takatsuki F.C. Ladies
1986 (Final)	Shimizu Dai-hachi S.C.	1–0	Yomiuri S.C. Ladies Beleza
1987 (Final)	Yomiuri S.C. Ladies Beleza	2–0	Shimizu Dai-hachi S.C.
1988 (Final)	Yomiuri S.C. Ladies Beleza	2–0	Takatsuki F.C. Ladies
1989 (Final)	Takatsuki F.C. Ladies	1–0	Shimizu F.C. Ladies
1990 (Final)	Nikko Securities Dream Ladies	3–3 (4–1 pen)	Suzuyo Shimizu F.C. Lovely Ladies
1991 (Final)	Suzuyo Shimizu F.C. Lovely Ladies	0–0 (3–1 pen)	Yomiuri S.C. Ladies Beleza
1992 (Final)	Nikko Securities Dream Ladies	1–0	Yomiuri S.C. Ladies Beleza
1993 (Final)	Yomiuri S.C. Ladies Beleza	2–0	Prima Ham F.C. Kunoichi
1994 (Final)	Prima Ham F.C. Kunoichi	4–1	Nikko Securities Dream Ladies
1995 (Final)	Fujita Soccer Club Mercury	3–2	Yomiuri-Seiyu Beleza
1996 (Final)	Nikko Securities Dream Ladies	3–0	Yomiuri-Seiyu Beleza
1997 (Final)	Yomiuri-Seiyu Beleza	1–0	Prima Ham F.C. Kunoichi
1998 (Final)	Prima Ham F.C. Kunoichi	1–0	Nikko Securities Dream Ladies
1999 (Final)	Tasaki Perule F.C.	0–0 (4–2 pen)	Prima Ham F.C. Kunoichi
2000 (Final)	NTV Beleza	2–1	Tasaki Perule F.C.
2001 (Final)	Iga F.C. Kunoichi	2–1 (a.e.t.)	Tasaki Perule F.C.
2002 (Final)	Tasaki Perule F.C.	1–0	NTV Beleza
2003 (Final)	Tasaki Perule F.C.	2–2 (5–3 pen)	NTV Beleza
2004 (Final)	NTV Beleza	3–1	Saitama Reinas F.C.
2005 (Final)	NTV Beleza	4–1	Tasaki Perule F.C.
2006 (Final)	Tasaki Perule F.C.	2–0	Okayama Yunogo Belle
2007 (Final)	NTV Beleza	2–0	Tasaki Perule F.C.
2008 (Final)	NTV Beleza	4–1	INAC Leonessa
2009 (Final)	NTV Beleza	2–0	Urawa Red Diamonds Ladies
2010 (Final)	INAC Kobe Leonessa	1–1 (3–2 pen)	Urawa Red Diamonds Ladies
2011 (Final)	INAC Kobe Leonessa	3–0	Albirex Niigata Ladies
2012 (Final)	INAC Kobe Leonessa	1–0	JEF United Ichihara Chiba Ladies
2013 (Final)	INAC Kobe Leonessa	2–2 (4–3 pen)	Albirex Niigata Ladies
2014 (Final)	NTV Beleza	1–0	Urawa Red Diamonds Ladies
2015 (Final)	INAC Kobe Leonessa	1–0	Albirex Niigata Ladies
2016 (Final)	INAC Kobe Leonessa	0–0 (5–4 pen)	Albirex Niigata Ladies
2017 (Final)	NTV Beleza	3–0	Nojima Stella Kanagawa Sagamihara
2018 (Final)	NTV Beleza	2–2 (2-0 ET)	INAC Kobe Leonessa
2019 (Final)	NTV Beleza	1–0	Urawa Red Diamonds Ladies
2020 (Final)	NTV Tokyo Verdy Beleza	4–3	Urawa Red Diamonds Ladies
2021 (Final)	Urawa Red Diamonds Ladies	1–0	JEF United Ichihara Chiba Ladies
2022 (Final)	NTV Tokyo Verdy Beleza	4–0	INAC Kobe Leonessa
2023 (Final)	INAC Kobe Leonessa	1–1 (6–5 pen)	Urawa Red Diamonds Ladies
2024 (Final)	Urawa Red Diamonds Ladies	1–1 (5–4 pen)	Albirex Niigata Ladies
2025 (Final)	Sanfrecce Hiroshima Regina	2–1	INAC Kobe Leonessa

== See also ==
- Football in Japan
- Women's football in Japan
- Japan Football Association (JFA)
- Japanese association football league system
- WE League (I)
- Nadeshiko League
  - Nadeshiko League Division 1 (II)
  - Nadeshiko League Division 2 (III)
- Regional Leagues (IV)
- Empress's Cup (National Cup)
- Nadeshiko League Cup (League Cup)
