= Tokyo Shidax LSC =

- Full name: Tokyo Shidax LSC
- Nickname: Shidax LSC
- Founded: 1982
- Dissolved: 1996

Tokyo Shidax LSC (東京シダックスLSC) was a womens association football team that played in Division 1 of Japan's Nadeshiko League.

The club was formed in 1982 and disbanded in 1996.

== Results ==
Season	Domestic League				National Cup	League Cup	League Note
Season	League	Level	Place	Tms.	National Cup	League Cup	League Note
1982	–	–	–	–	Semi-final(4th)	–	
1983	–	–	–	–	Quarter-finals	–	
1984	–	–	–	–	Quarter-finals	–	
1985	–	–	–	–	DNQ	–	
1986	–	–	–	–	DNQ	–	
1987	–	–	–	–	Quarter-finals	–	
1988	–	–	–	–	Quarter-finals	–	
1989	JLSL	1	4th	6	Semi-finals	–	
1990	JLSL	1	5th	6	Quarter-finals	–	
1991	JLSL	1	7th	10	Quarter-finals	–	
1992	JLSL	1	9th	10	2nd Stage	–	
1993	JLSL	1	8th	10	2nd Stage	–	1st Stage : 9th / 2nd Stage : 8th
1994	L	1	7th	10	Quarter-finals	–	1st Stage : 4th / 2nd Stage : 8th
1995	L	1	7th	10	Semi-finals	–	1st Stage : 9th / 2nd Stage : 10th / Dissolved

== Transition of team name ==
- FC Kodaira: 1982 - 1988
- Shinko Seiko FC Clair: 1989 - 1992
- Tokyo Shidax LSC: 1993 - 1996
