= Takatsuki Ladies FC =

Japanese women's football club

Takatsuki Ladies FC (高槻女子フットボールクラブ) was a women's football team. The club was founded in 1978, and disbanded in 1997.

== Honors ==
=== Domestic competitions ===
- Empress's Cup All-Japan Women's Football Tournament
  - Champions (1) : 1989
  - Runners-up (5) : 1979, 1983, 1984, 1985, 1988

== Results ==
Season	Domestic League			National Cup	League Cup
Season	Level	Place	Tms.	National Cup	League Cup
1979	-	-	-	Runners-up	-
1980	-	-	-	Semi-finals	-
1981	-	-	-	Semi-finals	-
1982	-	-	-	Semi-final(3rd)	-
1983	-	-	-	Runners-up	-
1984	-	-	-	Runners-up	-
1985	-	-	-	Runners-up	-
1986	-	-	-	Semi-finals	-
1987	-	-	-	Semi-finals	-
1988	-	-	-	Runners-up	-
1989	-	-	-	Champion	-
1990	-	-	-	Quarter-finals	-
1991	-	-	-	-	-
1992	-	-	-	2nd Stage	-
