= Suzuyo Shimizu FC Lovely Ladies =

Suzuyo Shimizu FC Lovely Ladies 鈴与清水FCラブリーレディース
- Full name: Suzuyo Shimizu FC Lovely Ladies
- Nickname(s): Shimizu FC Ladies
- Founded: 1986

Suzuyo Shimizu FC Lovely Ladies (鈴与清水FCラブリーレディース) was a women's football team which played in Division 1 of Japan's Nadeshiko League. It was one of the founding clubs in the league when it was created in 1989. The club was disbanded in 1999.

== Founding ==
The Suzuyo Shimizu FC Lovely Ladies team was a new team created specifically for the new Japan Women’s Football League competition, mostly using the best players from the previous Shimizudaihachi SC team, which had been dominant in the Shizuoka League, winning 7 consecutive titles between 1980 and 1986, but which was unable to afford to participate in the new completion. The players chosen to move to the new team were forward Etsuko Handa, midfielders Chiaki Yamada and Futaba Kioka, and defender Sayuri Yamaguchi.

Along with these veteran players, the team chose a number of younger players, and also imported a foreign player - a practice which was common in men’s teams of the era, but unusual until that point in Japan’s domestic women’s competitions.

The foreign players signed to the team at its creation in 1989 were forward Chou Tai-ying, a Taiwanese player who had been playing professionally in Germany, and led the scoring for the club in the 1989 season with 12 goals.

The Suzuyo Shimizu F.C. Lovely Ladies won the inaugural Nadeshiko League in 1989.

== Honors ==
=== Domestic competitions ===
- Nadeshiko.League Division 1
  - Champions (1) : 1989
  - Runners-up (4) : 1990, 1991, 1992, 1993
- Empress's Cup All-Japan Women's Football Tournament
  - Champions (1) : 1991
  - Runners-up (2) : 1989, 1990

== Results ==
Season	Domestic League				National Cup	League Cup	League Note
Season	League	Level	Place	Tms.	National Cup	League Cup	League Note
1989	JLSL	1	1st	6	Runners-up	-	
1990	JLSL	1	2nd	6	Runners-up	-	
1991	JLSL	1	2nd	10	Champion	-	
1992	JLSL	1	2nd	10	Semi-finals	-	
1993	JLSL	1	2nd	10	2nd Stage	-	1st Stage : 1st / 2nd Stage : 4th
1994	L	1	4th	10	Quarter-finals	-	1st Stage : 6th / 2nd Stage : 3rd
1995	L	1	3rd	10	Quarter-finals	-	1st Stage : 3rd / 2nd Stage : 7th
1996	L	1	4th	10	Semi-finals	3rd	1st Stage : 5th / 2nd Stage : 5th
1997	L	1	4th	10	Semi-finals	Group League	1st Stage : 4th / 2nd Stage : 4th
1998	L	1	3rd	10	Semi-finals	Group League	1st Stage : 5th / 2nd Stage : 2nd / Moved to Regional League
1999	Tokai	2			Quarter-finals	-	Dissolved

== Transition of team name ==
- Shimizu FC Women : 1986 - 1988
- Shimizu FC Ladies : 1989
- Suzuyo Shimizu FC Lovely Ladies : 1990 - 1999

== Former players ==
- (Sweden) Anneli Andelén
- (Sweden) Kristin Bengtsson
- (United States) Cindy Daws
- (Netherlands) Nathalie Geeris
- (Japan) Futaba Kioka
- (United States) Keri Sanchez
- (Taiwan) Chou Tai-ying
