= Nissan FC Ladies =

Nissan FC Ladies 日産FCレディース
- Full name: Nissan FC Ladies
- Founded: 1972
- Dissolved: 1993

Nissan FC Ladies (日産FCレディース) was a women's football team which played in Division 1 of Japan's Nadeshiko League. It was founded in 1972 but disbanded five years later in 1994.

== Honors ==
=== Domestic competitions ===
- Empress's Cup All-Japan Women's Football Tournament
  - Champions (1) : 1979
  - Runners-up (2) : 1980, 1982

== Results ==
Season	Domestic League				National Cup	League Cup	League Note
Season	League	Level	Place	Tms.	National Cup	League Cup	League Note
1979	-	-	-	-	Champion	-	
1980	-	-	-	-	Runners-up	-	
1981	-	-	-	-	Semi-finals	-	
1982	-	-	-	-	Runners-up	-	
1983	-	-	-	-	Semi-finals	-	
1984	-	-	-	-	Semi-final(4th)	-	
1985	-	-	-	-	Quarter-finals	-	
1986	-	-	-	-	Quarter-finals	-	
1987	-	-	-	-	Quarter-finals	-	
1988	-	-	-	-	Semi-finals	-	
1989	JLSL	1	5th	6	Quarter-finals	-	
1990	JLSL	1	4th	6	1st Stage	-	
1991	JLSL	1	5th	10	Semi-finals	-	
1992	JLSL	1	7th	10	Quarter-finals	-	
1993	JLSL	1	4th	10	Quarter-finals	-	1st Stage: 4th / 2nd Stage: 6th / Dissolved

== Transition of team name ==
- FC Jinnan : 1972 – 1985
- Nissan FC Ladies : 1986 – 1994

== See also ==
- Japanese women's club teams
