= 2024 Empress's Cup =

Football tournament season

- Dates: 17 November 2024 – 25 January 2025

Final positions
- Champions: Urawa Red Diamonds (2nd title)
- Runners-up: Albirex Niigata

The 2024 Empress's Cup (Japanese: 皇后杯 JFA 第46回全日本女子サッカー選手権大会, Hepburn: Kōgō-hai JFA Dai 46-kai Zen'nihon Joshi Sakkā Senshuken Taikai) was the 46th season of the Japanese women's football main cup competition.

== Calendar and format ==
Below are the dates for each round as given by the official schedule:

Round	Date(s)	Number of fixtures	Clubs
First Round	17 November 2024	4	8 → 4
Second round	23–25 November 2024	16	32 (16+12+4) → 16
Third round	30 November–1 December 2024	8	16 → 8
Fourth round	8 December 2024	4	8 → 4
Round of 16	14–15 December 2024	8	16 (12+4) → 8
Quarter-finals	22 December 2024	4	8 → 4
Semi-finals	18 January 2025	2	4 → 2
Final	25 January 2025	1	2 → 1

== Participating clubs ==
=== WE League ===
All 12 teams playing in the 2024–25 WE League. They all join in the Round of 16.

Club	Apps.	Prefecture
MyNavi Sendai	13th	Miyagi
Urawa Red Diamonds	26th	Saitama
Omiya Ardija Ventus	4th	Saitama
Chifure AS Elfen Saitama	25th	Saitama
JEF United Chiba	27th	Chiba
Tokyo Verdy	42nd	Tokyo
Nojima Stella Kanagawa Sagamihara	13th	Kanagawa
Nagano Parceiro	19th	Nagano
Albirex Niigata	22nd	Niigata
Cerezo Osaka Yanmar	10th	Osaka
INAC Kobe Leonessa	21st	Hyogo
Sanfrecce Hiroshima Regina	4th	Hiroshima

=== Nadeshiko League ===
All 12 teams playing in the 2024 Nadeshiko League 1st Division. They all join in the second round.

Club	Apps.	Prefecture
Bunnys GFC White Star	5th	Gunma
Orca Kamogawa	9th	Chiba
Sfida Setagaya	12th	Tokyo
Yokohama FC Seagulls	10th	Kanagawa
Nittaidai SMG Yokohama	26th	Kanagawa
Shizuoka SSU Bonita	16th	Shizuoka
Asahi Intecc Loveledge Nagoya	14th	Aichi
Iga FC Kunoichi Mie	38th	Mie
Speranza Osaka-Takatsuki	33rd	Osaka
AS Harima Albion	11th	Hyogo
Ehime FC	16th	Ehime
Viamaterras Miyazaki	4th	Miyazaki

=== Regional representatives ===
There are 24 regional representatives, who qualified through regional qualification. Eight join the competition in the first round, while the other 16 in the second. All teams up from the Nadeshiko League 2nd Division to the amateur leagues participates in regional qualification.

Region	Team	Prefecture	League	Apps.
Hokkaido	Sapporo University Vista	Hokkaido	Hokkaido Football League	3rd
Tohoku	JFA Academy Fukushima	Fukushima	Nadeshiko League 2nd Div.	17th
Tohoku	MyNavi Sendai (Youth)	Miyagi	Tohoku Football League 1st Div.	2nd
Kanto	Vonds Ichihara	Chiba	Kanto Soccer League 1st Div.	1st
Kanto	Tokyo International University	Tokyo	Kanto Soccer League 1st Div.	3rd
Kanto	Yamanashi Gakuin University	Yamanashi	Kanto Soccer League 2nd Div.	2nd
Kanto	Nihon University	Tokyo	Kanto University Soccer League 1st Div.	2nd
Kanto	Nippon TV Tokyo Verdy Menina	Tokyo	Kanto U-18 Soccer League	17th
Kanto	Yamato Sylphid	Kanagawa	Nadeshiko League 2nd Div.	7th
Kanto	Kanagawa University	Kanagawa	Kanto Soccer League 1st Div.	9th
Hokushin'etsu	Niigata University of Health and Welfare	Niigata	Hokushin'etsu Football League	8th
Tokai	Veertien Mie	Mie	Nadeshiko League 2nd Div.	4th
Tokai	Aichi Toho University	Aichi	Tokai Football League 1st Div.	3rd
Kansai	Meiji University of Integrative Medicine	Kyoto	Kansai University Soccer League 1st Div.	1st
Chugoku	Okayama Yunogo Belle	Okayama	Nadeshiko League 2nd Div.	21st
Chugoku	KIU Charme Okayama Takahashi	Okayama	Nadeshiko League 2nd Div.	19th
Chugoku	Diosa Izumo	Shimane	Nadeshiko League 2nd Div.	5th
Chugoku	Diavorosso Hiroshima	Hiroshima	Nadeshiko League 2nd Div.	3rd
Chugoku	AICJ High School	Hiroshima	Chugoku U-18 Football League	1st
Shikoku	FC Imabari	Ehime	Nadeshiko League 2nd Div.	5th
Shikoku	Naruto Uzushio High School	Tokushima	Shikoku Football League	3rd
Kyushu	Fukuoka J. Anclas	Fukuoka	Nadeshiko League 2nd Div.	17th
Kyushu	Shugakukan High School	Kumamoto	Kyushu Football League 1st Div.	1st
Kyushu	Kamimura Gakuen High School	Kagoshima	Kyushu Football League 1st Div.	14th

== Schedule ==
=== First round ===
17 November 1	Diosa Izumo	3–2	Kamimura Gakuen High School	Sakai
10:30	Hara 21'; Sumitoku 24'; Kawamitsu 36'	Report	Yamano 80'; Kubo 90+3'	Stadium: Technoport Fukui Stadium; Attendance: 135; Referee: Maki Yoshinaga

17 November 2	Tokyo International University	1–1 (5–3 p)	AICJ High School	Utsunomiya
14:00		Report	Miwa 49'	Stadium: Tochigi Green Stadium; Attendance: 135; Referee: Maki Tanaka

17 November 3	KIU Charme Okayama Takahashi	2–0	Shugakukan High School	Sakai
13:30	Furutani 62'; Iwata 73'	Report		Stadium: Technoport Fukui Stadium; Attendance: 113; Referee: Mie Otani

17 November 4	Diavorosso Hiroshima	1–0 (a.e.t.)	Aichi Toho University	Utsunomiya
11:00	Maeta 120+2'	Report		Stadium: Tochigi Green Stadium; Attendance: 111; Referee: Satomi Arakawa

=== Second round ===
23 November 5	Viamaterras Miyazaki	6–0	Diosa Izumo	Tottori
11:00	Own goal 27' (o.g.); Saito 37', 48'; Sakata 64'; Imakura 74', 77'	Report		Stadium: Axis Bird Stadium; Attendance: 169; Referee: Nami Hirota

23 November 6	Naruto Uzushio High School	0–4	JFA Academy Fukushima	Tottori
14:00		Report	Itamura 28', 64', 79'; Ito 90+3'	Stadium: Axis Bird Stadium

23 November 7	Orca Kamogawa	1–2	Kanagawa University	Ishinomaki
13:30	Saito 52'	Report	Own goal 4' (o.g.); Suzuki 21'	Stadium: Seihoku Park Ishinomaki Football Field

24 November 8	Sfida Setagaya	4–0	Yamanashi Gakuin University	Ishinomaki
13:30	Shinbori 17', 35', 53'; Taguchi 27'	Report		Stadium: Seihoku Park Ishinomaki Football Field

24 November 9	Asahi Intecc Loveledge Nagoya	3–0	Tokyo International University	Fujieda
11:00	Mizuno 1'; Takashima 49'; Fuchigami 50'	Report		Stadium: Fujieda Soccer Stadium

24 November 10	Tokyo Verdy Menina	6–0	Sapporo University Vista	Ishinomaki
10:30	Ono 1', 69'; Aso 13', 27'; Nishio 29'; Ito 32'	Report		Stadium: Seihoku Park Ishinomaki Football Field

23 November 11	Iga FC Kunoichi Mie	4–0	Niigata University HW	Fujieda
14:00	Hirata 31', 66'; Murakami 72'; Nishikawa 73'	Report		Stadium: Fujieda Soccer Stadium

24 November 12	AS Harima Albion	1–0 (a.e.t.)	Veertien Mie	Miki
14:30	Kamei 105+2'	Report		Stadium: Miki Athletic Stadium

24 November 13	Speranza Osaka-Takatsuki	1–4	KIU Charme Okayama Takahashi	Miki
11:30	Own goal 34' (o.g.)	Report	Own goal 6' (o.g.); Iwata 59'; Nakamura 67'; Aoyama 79'	Stadium: Miki Athletic Stadium

23 November 14	Yamato Sylphid	0–6	Okayama Yunogo Belle	Utsunomiya
14:00		Report	Kakoi 20', 78'; Komatsu 24'; Uchida 51'; Yokoyama 53'; Kondo 64'	Stadium: Tochigi Green Stadium

24 November 15	Bunnys GFC White Star	4–1	Fukuoka J. Anclas	Tottori
14:00	Shioya 9', 78'; Wyatt 72'; Sato 73'	Report	Koyama 79'	Stadium: Axis Bird Stadium

24 November 16	Ehime FC	2–1 (a.e.t.)	Nihon University	Tottori
11:00	Kuroiwa 66'; Nishimura 98'	Report	Shibata 63'	Stadium: Axis Bird Stadium

24 November 17	Yokohama FC Seagulls	4–1	Diavorosso Hiroshima	Utsunomiya
11:00	Kawano 42'; Oka 64', 66'; Muroi 77'	Report	Nanae 25'	Stadium: Tochigi Green Stadium

23 November 18	Vonds Ichihara	3–0	MyNavi Sendai Youth	Ishinomaki
10:30	Nishiyama 41'; Ueda 45+1'; Matsumoto 66'	Report		Stadium: Seihoku Park Ishinomaki Football Field

23 November 19	Shizuoka SSU Bonita	4–0	FC Imabari	Fujieda
11:00	Kanamaru 3'; Hikosaka 13'; Moriya 79'; Nakajima 90+2'	Report		Stadium: Fujieda Soccer Stadium

24 November 20	Nittaidai SMG Yokohama	2–0	Meiji University of Integrative Medicine	Fujieda
14:00	Shinoda 25'; Mori 90'	Report		Stadium: Fujieda Soccer Stadium

=== Third round ===
1 December 21	Viamaterras Miyazaki	3–1	JFA Academy Fukushima	Ishinomaki
13:10	Yamamoto 25', 33', 59'	Report	Itamura 9'	Stadium: Seihoku Park Ishinomaki Football Field; Attendance: 103; Referee: Ayano Yanagi

1 December 22	Kanagawa University	0–2	Sfida Setagaya	Suzuka
11:00		Report	Horie 11'; Toda 80'	Stadium: Mie Kotsu G Sports no Mori Suzuka; Attendance: 142; Referee: Amy Yamauchi

1 December 23	Asahi Intecc Loveledge Nagoya	2–0	Tokyo Verdy Menina	Suzuka
14:00	Nagata 11'; Miura 64'	Report		Stadium: Mie Kotsu G Sports no Mori Suzuka; Attendance: 231; Referee: Misaki Katsumata

1 December 24	Iga FC Kunoichi Mie	1–1 (a.e.t.) (5–3 p)	AS Harima Albion	Suzuka
14:00	Kamiya 90+2'	Report	Kawasaki 31'	Stadium: Mie Kotsu G Sports no Mori Suzuka; Attendance: 244; Referee: Yurika Araki

30 November 25	KIU Charme Okayama Takahashi	0–2	Okayama Yunogo Belle	Suzuka
11:00		Report	Yokoyama 13'; Kakoi 23'	Stadium: Mie Kotsu G Sports no Mori Suzuka; Attendance: 156; Referee: Isako Onoda

1 December 26	Bunnys GFC White Star	0–5	Ehime FC	Sakai
10:30		Report	Tago 29'; Matsumoto 36'; Own goal 56'; Osajima 70'; Kojima 84'	Stadium: Technoport Fukui Stadium; Attendance: 108; Referee: Midori Yokota

1 December 27	Yokohama FC Seagulls	0–1	Vonds Ichihara	Ishinomaki
10:30		Report	Ueda 78'	Stadium: Seihoku Park Ishinomaki Football Field; Attendance: 136; Referee: Kyoko Kondo

1 December 28	Shizuoka SSU Bonita	4–0	Nittaidai SMG Yokohama	Sakai
13:30	Tsuchiya 2', 60'; Nakajima 88'; Shiozawa 90+2'	Report		Stadium: Technoport Fukui Stadium; Attendance: 106; Referee: Minami Sasaki

=== Fourth round ===
8 December 29	Viamaterras Miyazaki	3–2 (a.e.t.)	Sfida Setagaya	Fujieda
11:00	Terada 13'; Yamamoto 23', 120+1'	Report	Kaneko 5'; Kashiwabara 66'	Stadium: Fujieda Soccer Stadium; Attendance: 190; Referee: Junko Kirihara

8 December 30	Asahi Intecc Loveledge Nagoya	1–0	Iga FC Kunoichi Mie	Miki
14:30	Ezaki 12'	Report		Stadium: Miki Athletic Stadium; Attendance: 185; Referee: Nami Hirota

8 December 31	Okayama Yunogo Belle	5–2	Yokohama FC	Miki
11:30	Taniguchi 11'; Yokoyama 14', 39'; Kakoi 65'; Kondo 71'	Report	Sakurai 5'; Mori 42'	Stadium: Miki Athletic Stadium; Attendance: 463; Referee: Maiko Hagio

8 December 32	Vonds Ichihara	2–1	Shizuoka SSU Bonita	Fujieda
14:00	Sakuraba 45', 64'	Report	Nakajima 78'	Stadium: Fujieda Soccer Stadium; Attendance: 280; Referee: Marika Iwamoto

=== Round of 16 ===
14 December 33	Omiya Ardija Ventus	0–1 (a.e.t.)	Viamaterras Miyazaki	Miki
11:30		Report	Yamamoto 110'	Stadium: Miki Athletic Stadium; Attendance: 311; Referee: Kumi Niitsuma

15 December 34	Tokyo Verdy Beleza	2–0	JEF United Chiba	Hiratsuka
14:00	Yamamoto 72'; Sakabe 75'	Report		Stadium: Lemon Gas Stadium Hiratsuka; Attendance: 1,785; Referee: Azusa Sugino

15 December 35	Albirex Niigata	2–1	Asahi Intecc Loveledge Nagoya	Iga
13:00	Sugita 21'; Takikawa 86'	Report	Fuchigami 16'	Stadium: Ueno Sports Park Stadium; Attendance: 410; Referee: Fusako Kajiyama

15 December 36	MyNavi Sendai	1–0 (a.e.t.)	Cerezo Osaka Yanmar	Miki
11:30	Ibaraki 118'	Report		Stadium: Miki Athletic Stadium; Attendance: 463; Referee: Haruna Kanematsu

15 December 37	Nojima Stella Kanagawa Sagamihara	2–0	Okayama Yunogo Belle	Hiratsuka
11:00	Ito 48'; Katayama 63'	Report		Stadium: Lemon Gas Stadium Hiratsuka; Attendance: 922; Referee: Junko Kirihara

15 December 38	Nagano Parceiro	0–2	Urawa Red Diamonds	Miki
14:30		Report	Takahashi 38'; Ito 74'	Stadium: Miki Athletic Stadium; Attendance: 379; Referee: Satomi Arakawa

14 December 39	Sanfrecce Hiroshima Regina	3–2 (a.e.t.)	Vonds Ichihara	Miki
14:30	Own goal 10'; Takahashi 26'; Ueno 120+1'	Report	Okada 48'; Kobayashi 83'	Stadium: Miki Athletic Stadium; Attendance: 387; Referee: Nanako Tanimoto

14 December 40	Chifure AS Elfen Saitama	2–3 (a.e.t.)	INAC Kobe Leonessa	Kumagaya
12:00	Kishi 19'; Tochitani 88'	Report	Mizuno 48', 90'; Narumiya 98'	Stadium: Kumagaya Athletic Stadium; Attendance: 848; Referee: Ayano Yanagi

=== Quarter-finals ===
22 December 41	Viamaterras Miyazaki	0–1	Tokyo Verdy Beleza	Marugame
11:00		Report	Sakabe 30'	Stadium: Pikara Stadium; Attendance: 397; Referee: Narumi Baba

22 December 42	Albirex Niigata	2–1	MyNavi Sendai	Hiroshima
11:00	Kawamura 13'; Sugita 19'	Report	Osafune 42'	Stadium: Sanfrecce Village Hiroshima No.1 Ball Game Stadium; Attendance: 359; Referee: Kotomi Omura

22 December 43	Nojima Stella Kanagawa Sagamihara	0–1	Urawa Red Diamonds	Marugame
14:00		Report	Ito 6'	Stadium: Pikara Stadium; Attendance: 346; Referee: Kazue Kusadokoro

22 December 44	Sanfrecce Hiroshima Regina	0–1	INAC Kobe Leonessa	Hiroshima
14:00		Report	Yamamoto 3'	Stadium: Sanfrecce Village Hiroshima No.1 Ball Game Stadium; Attendance: 1,265; Referee: Kumiko Matsuo

=== Semi-finals ===
18 January 2025 45	Tokyo Verdy Beleza	1–1 (a.e.t.) (0–3 p)	Albirex Niigata	Kyoto
10:45	Matsunaga 6'	Report	Tomioka 90+5'	Stadium: Sanga Stadium by Kyocera; Attendance: 1,224; Referee: Satomi Arakawa

18 January 2025 46	Urawa Red Diamonds	4–1	INAC Kobe Leonessa	Kyoto
14:00	Takahashi 42'; Shimada 45+2'; Shiokoshi 66'; Ito 73'	Report	Sampson 22'	Stadium: Sanga Stadium by Kyocera; Attendance: 1,813; Referee: Haruna Kanematsu

=== Final ===
25 January 2025
13:00
47

Albirex Niigata	1–1 (a.e.t.)	Urawa Red Diamonds
Takikawa 28'	Report	Takahashi 11'
Penalties
	4–5

Edion Peace Wing Hiroshima, Hiroshima
Attendance: 3,063
Referee: Yoshimi Yamashita

== See also ==
- 2024–25 WE League season
- 2024–25 WE League Cup
