= 2023 Empress's Cup =

Football tournament season

(Japanese: 皇后杯 JFA 第45回全日本女子サッカー選手権大会)
- Dates: 18 November 2023 – 27 January 2024

Final positions
- Champions: INAC Kobe Leonessa (7th title)
- Runners-up: Urawa Red Diamonds

The 2023 Empress's Cup was the 45th season of the Japanese women's football main cup competition.

== Calendar and format ==
Below are the dates for each round as given by the official schedule:

Round	Date(s)	Number of fixtures	Clubs
First Round	18–19 November 2023	4	8 → 4
Second round	25–26 November 2023	16	32 (16+12+4) → 16
Third round	2–3 December 2023	8	16 → 8
Fourth round	10 December 2023	4	8 → 4
Round of 16	16–17 December 2023	8	16 (12+4) → 8
Quarter-finals	14 January 2024	4	8 → 4
Semi-finals	20 January 2024	2	4 → 2
Final	27 January 2024	1	2 → 1

== Participating clubs ==
2023–24 WE League season All 12 clubs join in the fifth round	2023 Nadeshiko League Div. 1 All 12 clubs join in the second round	Regional Leagues entrants 16 clubs join in the second round	Regional Leagues entrants 8 clubs join in the first round
AC Nagano Parceiro; Albirex Niigata; Cerezo Osaka Yanmar; Chifure AS Elfen Saitama; INAC Kobe Leonessa; JEF United Chiba; MyNavi Sendai; Nojima Stella Kanagawa Sagamihara; Omiya Ardija; Sanfrecce Hiroshima Regina; Tokyo Verdy Beleza; Urawa Red Diamonds	Asahi Intecc Loveledge Nagoya; Bunnys GFC White Star; Ehime FC; AS Harima Albion; Iga FC Kunoichi Mie; Nittaidai SMG Yokohama; Orca Kamogawa; Sfida Setagaya; Shizuoka SSU Bonita; Speranza Osaka-Takatsuki; Yamato Sylphid; Yokohama FC Seagulls	Hokkaido: Norddea Hokkaido; Tohoku: MyNavi Sendai (Youth); Hokushin'etsu: Lily Wolf F Ishikawa; Kanto: Jumonji High School Teikyo Heisei University Tokyo Verdy Menina Toyo University; Tokai: Fujieda Junshin High School JFA Academy Fukushima; Kansai: Osaka Sangyo University Tezukayama Gakuin University; Chugoku: Shunan University Vinculum; Shikoku: FC Imabari; Kyushu: Energic Ryukyu Deigos Fukuoka J. Anclas Yanagigaura High School	Hokkaido: Sapporo University Vista; Kanto: Nihon University Waseda University; Tokai: Veertien Mie; Chugoku: Diavorosso Hiroshima KIU Charme Okayama Takahashi Okayama Yunogo Belle; Kyushu: Viamaterras Miyazaki

== Schedule ==
=== First round ===
19 November 2023 1	Okayama Yunogo Belle	7–0	Sapporo University Vista	Hitachinaka
11:00	Toriumi 45'; Yokoyama 45+2', 83', 90+3'; Akimoto 49'; Araya 61'; Uchida 87'	Report		Stadium: Hitachinaka City Stadium

18 November 2023 2	Viamaterras Miyazaki	4–0	Diavorosso Hiroshima	Utsunomiya
11:00	Saito 6', 75', 82'; Nagano 68'	Report		Stadium: Tochigi Green Stadium

19 November 2023 3	Veertien Mie	0–4	Nihon University	Hitachinaka
14:00		Report	Fujiwara 36', 88'; Kobayashi 58', 78'	Stadium: Hitachinaka City Stadium

18 November 2023 4	Waseda University	2–1 (a.e.t.)	KIU Charme Okayama Takahashi	Utsunomiya
14:00	Kasahara 43'; Tsukiji 109'	Report	Itakura 18'	Stadium: Tochigi Green Stadium

=== Second round ===
26 November 2023 5	Orca Kamogawa	2–0	Okayama Yunogo Belle	Tottori
14:00	Suzuki 4', 24'	Report		Stadium: Axis Bird Stadium

26 November 2023 6	Fujieda Junshin High School	4–0	Lily Wolf F. Ishikawa	Fujieda
14:00	Tsujisawa 36'; Kubota 52'; Shimoyoshi 78'; Mochizuki 82'	Report		Stadium: Fujieda Soccer Stadium

25 November 2023 7	Bunnys GFC White Star	1–1 (a.e.t.) (4–5 p)	Osaka Sangyo University	Iga
10:30	Oya 25'	Report	Yano 53'	Stadium: Ueno Sports Park Stadium

26 November 2023 8	Ehime FC	4–0	Jumonji High School	Ishinomaki
10:30	Tago 3'; Kojima 23', 32'; Sakurai 40'	Report		Stadium: Ishinomaki Sports Park Football Field

26 November 2023 9	Asahi Intecc Loveledge Nagoya	1–2	Viamaterras Miyazaki	Iga
10:30	Kato 77'	Report	Saito 7'; Kakazu 38'	Stadium: Ueno Sports Park Stadium

25 November 2023 10	Toyo University	1–1 (a.e.t.) (4–3 p)	JFA Academy Fukushima	Fujieda
11:00	Miyamoto 67'	Report	Tanikawa 78'	Stadium: Fujieda Soccer Stadium

26 November 2023 11	AS Harima Albion	4–1	Energic Ryukyu Deigos	Fujieda
11:00	Uchida 2', 40'; Kamei 38', 89'	Report	Sakairi 80'	Stadium: Fujieda Soccer Stadium

25 November 2023 12	Speranza Osaka	1–0	Tezukayama Gakuin University	Iga
13:30	Hamada 79'	Report		Stadium: Ueno Sports Park Stadium

26 November 2023 13	Iga FC Kunoichi Mie	2–1	Nihon University	Iga
13:30	Tsuneda 28'; Hata 51'	Report	Kubo 16'	Stadium: Ueno Sports Park Stadium

25 November 2023 14	Fukuoka J. Anclas	1–0	Norddea Hokkaido	Ishinomaki
10:30	Hara 41'	Report		Stadium: Ishinomaki Sports Park Football Field

26 November 2023 15	Nittaidai SMG Yokohama	3–1	MyNavi Sendai Youth	Ishinomaki
13:30	Kaneko 16'; Kitazawa 36'; Watanabe 68'	Report	Tsuda 15'	Stadium: Ishinomaki Sports Park Football Field

25 November 2023 16	Shizuoka SSU Bonita	1–2	Teikyo Heisei University	Fujieda
14:00	Kanamaru 71'	Report	Yamada 47'; Sato 68'	Stadium: Fujieda Soccer Stadium

25 November 2023 17	Sfida Setagaya	1–0	Waseda University	Tottori
14:00	Watanabe 47'	Report		Stadium: Axis Bird Stadium

26 November 2023 18	Shunan University Vinculum	0–1	Tokyo Verdy Menina	Tottori
11:00		Report	Aoki 8'	Stadium: Axis Bird Stadium

25 November 2023 19	Yokohama FC Seagulls	5–1	FC Imabari	Ishinomaki
13:30	Katayama 37', 73', 83'; Kosuda 70'; Kurada 73'	Report	Morise 45+2'	Stadium: Ishinomaki Sports Park Football Field

25 November 2023 20	Yamato Sylphid	2–0	Yanagigaura High School	Tottori
11:00	Nebu 9'; Hamamoto 58'	Report		Stadium: Axis Bird Stadium

=== Third round ===
2 November 2023 21	Orca Kamogawa	2–3	Fujieda Junshin High School	Sakai
13:30	Kono 43'; Suzuki 49'	Report	Tsujisawa 1', 8', 90+3'	Stadium: Nitto Shinko Stadium Maruoka; Attendance: 103; Referee: Isako Onoda

2 November 2023 22	Osaka Sangyo University	0–2	Ehime FC	Sakai
10:30		Report	Kubota 37'; Omiya 76'	Stadium: Nitto Shinko Stadium Maruoka; Attendance: 110; Referee: Midori Yokota

3 November 2023 23	Viamaterras Miyazaki	1–0	Toyo University	Sakai
13:30	Saito 69'	Report		Stadium: Nitto Shinko Stadium Maruoka; Attendance: 98; Referee: Marika Iwamoto

3 November 2023 24	AS Harima Albion	3–0	Speranza Osaka	Suzuka
11:00	Uchida 40'; Katsurama 50'; Shono 72'	Report		Stadium: Mie Suzuka Sports Garden; Attendance: 184; Referee: Emi Yamauchi

3 November 2023 25	Iga FC Kunoichi Mie	2–0	Fukuoka J. Anclas	Suzuka
14:00	Tsuneda 56'; Murakami 80'	Report		Stadium: Mie Suzuka Sports Garden

3 November 2023 26	Nittaidai SMG Yokohama	2–1	Teikyo Heisei University	Ishinomaki
13:30	Kitazawa 10'; Lee Song-ah 70'	Report	Koga 85'	Stadium: Ishinomaki Sports Park Football Field; Attendance: 43; Referee: Mizuki Yoshida

3 November 2023 27	Sfida Setagaya	1–0	Tokyo Verdy Menina	Ishinomaki
10:30	Nagasaki 27'	Report		Stadium: Ishinomaki Sports Park Football Field; Attendance: 113; Referee: Satomi Inaba

3 November 2023 28	Yokohama FC Seagulls	2–1	Yamato Sylphid	Sakai
10:30	Takahashi 45+3'; Katayama 75'	Report	Sue 43'	Stadium: Nitto Shinko Stadium Maruoka; Attendance: 76; Referee: Satomi Hamasaki

=== Fourth round ===
10 December 2023 29	Fujieda Junshin High School	1–3	Ehime FC	Ishinomaki
10:30	Uemoto 51'	Report	Own goal 17'; Tago 50'; Imakura 83'	Stadium: Ishinomaki Sports Park Football Field; Attendance: 141; Referee: Maiko Hagio

10 December 2023 30	Viamaterras Miyazaki	3–3 (a.e.t.) (4–5 p)	AS Harima Albion	Fujieda
14:00	Kakazu 5'; Fukumaru 8'; Nagatomi 114'	Report	Yamagishi 37'; Uchida 72'; Kamei 99'	Stadium: Fujieda Soccer Stadium; Attendance: 205; Referee: Mari Yamamoto

10 December 2023 31	Iga FC Kunoichi Mie	1–1 (a.e.t.) (2–4 p)	Nittaidai SMG Yokohama	Ishinomaki
13:30	Nishikawa 19'	Report	Lee Sung-ah 65'	Stadium: Ishinomaki Sports Park Football Field; Attendance: 80; Referee: Isako Onoda

10 December 2023 32	Sfida Setagaya	5–1	Yokohama FC Seagulls	Fujieda
11:00	Otake 7'; Mitsumoto 9'; Mochizuki 27'; Shinbori 45+1', 65'	Report	Gonno 74'	Stadium: Fujieda Soccer Stadium; Attendance: 290; Referee: Narumi Baba

=== Round of 16 ===
16 December 2023 33	Urawa Red Diamonds	2–0	Nittaidai SMG Yokohama	Utsunomiya
14:00	Sugasawa 20'; Ito 66'	Report		Stadium: Kanseki Stadium Tochigi; Attendance: 834; Referee: Satomi Arakawa

17 December 2023 34	JEF United Chiba	4–1	Nojima Stella Kanagawa Sagamihara	Shintomi
13:00	Tanaka 9'; Kamogawa 44'; Chiba 82'; Imada 90+5'	Report	Hamada 32'	Stadium: Unilever Stadium Shintomi; Attendance: 191; Referee: Saori Takahashi

17 December 2023 35	MyNavi Sendai	2–1	Ehime FC	Utsunomiya
11:00	Hirosawa 52'; Tabata 87'	Report	Tago 84'	Stadium: Kanseki Stadium Tochigi; Attendance: 284; Referee: Isako Onoda

16 December 2023 36	Sanfrecce Hiroshima Regina	1–0	Cerezo Osaka Yanmar	Utsunomiya
11:00	Nakashima 51'	Report		Stadium: Kanseki Stadium Tochigi; Attendance: 527; Referee: Junko Kirihara

17 December 2023 37	INAC Kobe Leonessa	2–1	AS Harima Albion	Miki
14:00	Takase 9'; Narumiya 81'	Report	Kojima 59'	Stadium: Miki Athletic Stadium; Attendance: 688; Referee: Miu Sone

17 December 2023 38	AC Nagano Parceiro	1–4	Albirex Niigata	Miki
11:00	Taneekarn 15'	Report	Sugita 16'; Ishibuchi 23'; Takikawa 30'; Kawasumi 52'	Stadium: Miki Athletic Stadium; Attendance: 490; Referee: Misaki Katsumata

17 December 2023 39	Tokyo Verdy Beleza	2–1	Sfida Setagaya	Utsunomiya
14:00	Fujino 80'; Kitamura 87'	Report	Kaneko 76'	Stadium: Kanseki Stadium Tochigi; Attendance: 593; Referee: Kazue Kusadokoro

17 December 2023 40	Omiya Ardija Ventus	0–1	Chifure AS Elfen Saitama	Kumagaya
13:00		Report	Onuma 23'	Stadium: Kumagaya Athletic Stadium; Attendance: 2,028; Referee: Mari Yamamoto

=== Quarter-finals ===
14 January 2024 41	Urawa Red Diamonds	2–0	JEF United Chiba	Utsunomiya
14:00	Ando 42', 50'	Report		Stadium: Kanseki Stadium Tochigi; Attendance: 1,567; Referee: Kazue Kusadokoro

14 January 2024 42	MyNavi Sendai	0–1	Sanfrecce Hiroshima Regina	Hiroshima
13:00		Report	Ueno 43'	Stadium: Hiroshima Regional Park No.1 Ball Game Stadium; Attendance: 1,231; Referee: Fusako Kajiyama

14 January 2024 43	INAC Kobe Leonessa	2–0	Albirex Niigata	Miki
13:00	Kitagawa 3'; Tanaka 52'	Report		Stadium: Miki Athletic Stadium; Attendance: 610; Referee: Misaki Katsumata

14 January 2024 44	Tokyo Verdy Beleza	0–1 (a.e.t.)	Chifure AS Elfen Saitama	Utsunomiya
11:00		Report	Kanehira 95'	Stadium: Kanseki Stadium Tochigi; Attendance: 1,038; Referee: Miu Sone

=== Semi-finals ===
20 January 2024 45	INAC Kobe Leonessa	3–2	Chifure AS Elfen Saitama	Kameoka
11:00	Tanaka 39'; Moriya 61'; Kitagawa 120'	Report	Yoshida 52'; Yumura 83'	Stadium: Sanga Stadium by Kyocera; Attendance: 1,079; Referee: Emi Chiba

20 January 2024 46	Urawa Red Diamonds	3–3 (4–2 p)	Sanfrecce Hiroshima Regina	Kameoka
14:00	Ando 19'; Naomoto 42'; Seike 112'	Report	Tachibana 45+3'; Takizawa 60'; Nakashima 91'	Stadium: Sanga Stadium by Kyocera; Attendance: 1,481; Referee: Azusa Sugino

=== Final ===
27 January 2024

Urawa Red Diamonds	1–1 (a.e.t.)	INAC Kobe Leonessa
Own goal 19' (o.g.)	Report	Takase 90+5'
Penalties
Sugasawa (penalty scored); Takahashi (penalty scored); Shiokoshi (penalty missed); Ikeda (penalty scored); Nagashima (penalty scored); Tsunoda (penalty scored); Ito (penalty missed)	5–6	(penalty scored) Tanaka; (penalty scored) Takase; (penalty missed) Narumiya; (penalty scored) Kuwahara; (penalty scored) Doko; (penalty scored) Ide; (penalty scored) Takeshige

Yodoko Sakura Stadium, Osaka
Attendance: 2,625
Referee: Asaka Koizumi

== Top scorers ==
Rank	Player	Club	Goals
1	(Japan) Yuma Saito	Viamaterras Miyazaki	5
2	(Japan) Yuna Katayama	Yokohama FC Seagulls	4
2	(Japan) Ai Tsujisawa	Fujieda Junshin High School	4
2	(Japan) Misuzu Uchida	AS Harima Albion	4
5	(Japan) Kozue Ando	Urawa Red Diamonds	3
5	(Japan) Nana Kamei	AS Harima Albion	3
5	(Japan) Haruhi Suzuki	Orca Kamogawa	3
5	(Japan) Natsumi Tago	Ehime FC	3
5	(Japan) Kumi Yokoyama	Okayama Yunogo Belle	3

== See also ==
- 2023–24 WE League season
- 2023–24 WE League Cup
