= 2022 in Japanese football =

Football in Japan
- Season: 2022

Men's football
- J1 League: Yokohama F. Marinos (5th title)
- J2 League: Albirex Niigata (1st title)
- J3 League: Iwaki FC (1st title)
- Japan Football League (JFL): Nara Club (1st title)
- Japanese Regional Leagues: Briobecca Urayasu (1st title)
- Emperor's Cup: Ventforet Kofu (1st title)
- J.League Cup: Sanfrecce Hiroshima (1st title)
- Super Cup: Urawa Red Diamonds (2nd title)

Women's football
- WE League: INAC Kobe Leonessa (1st title)
- Nadeshiko League Division 1: Sfida Setagaya FC (1st title)
- Nadeshiko League Division 2: Shizuoka SSU Bonita (1st title)

This article summarizes Japanese football in the 2022 season.

== National teams ==
Source: JFA

=== Men's ===
==== Senior ====
17 November International Friendly	Canada	2–1	Japan	Dubai, United Arab Emirates
17:40 UTC+4	Vitória 21'; Cavallini 90+5' (pen.)	Report (JFA); Report (Soccerway)	Soma 9'	Stadium: Al-Maktoum Stadium; Attendance: 2,971; Referee: Omar Mohamed Al Ali (United Arab Emirates)

23 November 2022 FIFA World Cup	Germany	1–2	Japan	Doha, Qatar
16:00 UTC+3	Gündoğan 33' (pen.)	Report (FIFA); Report (JFA); Report (Soccerway)	Dōan 75'; Asano 83'	Stadium: Khalifa International Stadium; Attendance: 42,608; Referee: Iván Barton (El Salvador)

27 November 2022 FIFA World Cup	Japan	0–1	Costa Rica	Al Rayyan, Qatar
13:00 UTC+3		Report (FIFA); Report (JFA); Report (Soccerway)	Fuller 81'	Stadium: Ahmad bin Ali Stadium; Attendance: 41,479; Referee: Michael Oliver (England)

1 December 2022 FIFA World Cup	Japan	2–1	Spain	Doha, Qatar
22:00 UTC+3	Dōan 48'; Tanaka 51'	Report (FIFA); Report (JFA); Report (Soccerway)	Morata 11'	Stadium: Khalifa International Stadium; Attendance: 44,851; Referee: Victor Gomes (South Africa)

5 December 2022 FIFA World Cup R16	Japan	1–1 (a.e.t.) (1–3 p)	Croatia	Al Wakrah, Qatar
18:00 UTC+3	Maeda 43'	Report	Perišić 55'	Stadium: Al Janoub Stadium; Attendance: 42,523; Referee: Ismail Elfath (United States)
	Penalties
	Minamino (penalty missed); Mitoma (penalty missed); Asano (penalty scored); Yoshida (penalty missed)		(penalty scored) Vlašić; (penalty scored) Brozović; (penalty missed) Livaja; (penalty scored) Pašalić

- Fixtures & Results (2022), JFA.jp

==== U-23 ====
20 September Friendly match	Cambodia	1–3	Japan	Phnom Penh, Cambodia
19:00 UTC+7		Report (JFA)		Stadium: Morodoc Teco National Stadium

- Fixtures & Results (U-23), JFA.jp

==== U-21 ====
23 March Dubai Cup U-23	Japan	1–0	Croatia	Dubai, UAE
16:00 UTC+4	Oda 81'	Report (JFA); Report (JFA) (in Japanese and English); Report (Soccerway)		Stadium: Al Awir Stadium

26 March Dubai Cup U-23	Qatar	0–2	Japan	Dubai, UAE
16:00 UTC+4		Report (JFA); Report (Soccerway)	Saito 53'; Yamamoto 86'	Stadium: Al Maktoum Stadium

29 March Dubai Cup U-23 Placement match	Saudi Arabia	0–1	Japan	Dubai, UAE
21:00 UTC+4		Report (JFA); Report (Soccerway)	Hosoya 20'	Stadium: Al Maktoum Stadium

3 June 2022 AFC U-23 Asian Cup	United Arab Emirates	1–2	Japan	Tashkent, Uzbekistan
18:00 UTC+5	Hassan 63'	Report (AFC); Report (JFA); Report (Soccerway)	Y. Suzuki 61'; Hosoya 76'	Stadium: Pakhtakor Stadium; Attendance: 270; Referee: Hettikamkanamge Perera (Sri Lanka)

6 June 2022 AFC U-23 Asian Cup	Japan	0–0	Saudi Arabia	Tashkent, Uzbekistan
18:00 UTC+5		Report (AFC); Report (JFA); Report (Soccerway)		Stadium: Pakhtakor Stadium; Attendance: 300; Referee: Ali Sabah (Iraq)

9 June 2022 AFC U-23 Asian Cup	Japan	3–0	Tajikistan	Tashkent, Uzbekistan
18:00 UTC+5	Matsuki 11'; Sato 56'; Nakashima 90+4'	Report (AFC); Report (JFA); Report (Soccerway)		Stadium: Milliy Stadium; Attendance: 375; Referee: Ali Shaban (Kuwait)

12 June 2022 AFC U-23 Asian Cup Quarter-finals	South Korea	0–3	Japan	Tashkent, Uzbekistan
18:00 UTC+5		Live Report; Stats Report	Y. Suzuki 22', 80'; Hosoya 65'	Stadium: Pakhtakor Stadium; Referee: Hanna Hattab (Syria)

15 June 2022 AFC U-23 Asian Cup Semi-finals	Uzbekistan	2–0	Japan	Tashkent, Uzbekistan
21:00 UTC+5	Jaloliddinov 60'; Norchaev 89'	Live Report; Stats Report		Stadium: Milliy Stadium; Attendance: 0 Referee: Ahmed Al-Kaf (Oman)

18 June 2022 AFC U-23 Asian Cup 3rd place match	Japan	3–0	Australia	Tashkent, Uzbekistan
18:00 UTC+5	Sato 7'; Trewin 39' (o.g.); Fujio 63'	Live Report; Stats Report		Stadium: Pakhtakor Stadium; Attendance: 230; Referee: Kim Hee-gon (South Korea)

22 September Friendly match	Switzerland	2–1	Japan	Marbella, Spain
20:00 UTC+2	Goal 9', 48'	Report (JFA)	Hosoya 15'	Stadium: Marbella Football Center

26 September Friendly match	Italy	1–1	Japan	Castel di Sangro, Italy
15:30 UTC+2	Fujio 55'	Report (JFA)	Colombo 39'	Stadium: Stadio Teofilo Patini

18 November Friendly match	Japan	v	Spain	Sevilla, Spain
20:00 UTC+2		Report (JFA); Report (Soccerway)		Stadium: Estadio La Cartuja

- Fixtures & Results (U-21), JFA.jp

==== U-17 ====
15 November Friendly	Croatia	2–1	Japan	Poreč, Croatia
	Goal 15', 90+1'	Report (JFA)	Jumpei Hayakawa 52'	Stadium: Zelena Laguna Sports Center

18 November Friendly	Sweden	1–4	Japan	Poreč, Croatia
	Goal 41' (pen.)		Rikuto Iida 30'; Hisatsugu Ishii 80'; Jumpei Hayakawa 87'; Toki Yukutomo 90'	Stadium: Zelena Laguna Sports Center

21 November Friendly	Denmark	0–2	Japan	Poreč, Croatia
		Report	Toki Yukutomo 60'; Keisuke Goto 70'	Stadium: Zelena Laguna Sports Center

- Fixtures & Results (U-17 2022), JFA.jp

==== U-16 ====
13 December Copa Joaju	Japan	4–1	Chile	Ypané, Paraguay
18:00 UTC−3	Homare Tokuda 14', 40'; Ryonosuke Yada 63'; Mark Isozaki 78' (pen.)	Report	Benjamín Ampuero 52'	Stadium: CARFEM; Referee: Carlos Paul Benítez (Paraguay)

15 December Copa Joaju	Japan	0–1	Colombia	Ypané, Paraguay
18:00 UTC−3		Report	Nicolás Profeta 90+3' (pen.)	Stadium: CARFEM; Referee: Juan Gabriel Benítez (Paraguay)

17 December Copa Joaju	Paraguay	3–3	Japan	Ypané, Paraguay
09:30 UTC−3	Rodrigo Villalba 22' (pen.); Fernando Leguizamón 49'; Juán Sánchez 89' (pen.)	Report	Shota Yamamoto 7'; Ryunosuke Sato 82'; Homare Tokuda 85'	Stadium: CARFEM; Referee: Mario Díaz de Vivar (Paraguay)

- Fixtures & Results (U-16 2022), JFA.jp

==== U-15 ====
23 November Federations Cup	Japan	2–0	Wales	Alicante, Spain
18:00 UTC+1	Yuji Doi 37'; Kota Sekiguchi 73'	Report (JFA); Report (FFC)		Stadium: Ciudad Deportiva Camilo Cano

25 November Federations Cup	Japan	0–0 (1–3 pen.)	Spain	Alicante, Spain
12:00 UTC+1		Report (JFA); Report (FFC)		Stadium: Estadio Polideportivo Pau Gasol; Referee: Mariano Esteban López

27 November Federations Cup 3rd-place match	Japan	2–0	Mexico	Alicante, Spain
16:00 UTC+1	Shion Nakayama 20'; Kento Hamasaki 45'	Report (JFA); Report (FFC)		Stadium: Estadio Polideportivo Pau Gasol

- Fixtures & Results (U-15 2022), JFA.jp

==== Futsal ====
28 September AFC Futsal Asian Cup	Japan	1–2	Saudi Arabia	Kuwait City, Kuwait
19:00 UTC+3	Crepaldi 3'		Al-Harthi 11'; Fqihe 15'	Stadium: Saad Al Abdullah Hall

30 September AFC Futsal Asian Cup	Japan	6–0	South Korea	Kuwait City, Kuwait
15:00 UTC+3	Seo Jung-woo 6' (o.g.); Oliveira 7'; Mizutani 18'; Ishida 28'; Kanazawa 29'; Yoshikawa 36'	Report (JFA)		Stadium: Saad Al Abdullah Hall

2 October AFC Futsal Asian Cup	Japan	2–0	Vietnam	Kuwait City, Kuwait
14:00 UTC+3	Shimizu 6', 36'			Stadium: Saad Al Abdullah Hall

4 October AFC Futsal Asian Cup QF	Japan	3–2	Indonesia	Kuwait City, Kuwait
14:00 UTC+3	Kanazawa 32'; Pires 38'; Mizutani 39'		Eko 21'; Dewa 40'	Stadium: Saad Al Abdullah Hall; Referee: Trương Quốc Dũng (Vietnam)

6 October AFC Futsal Asian Cup SF	Uzbekistan	1–2	Japan	Kuwait City, Kuwait
17:00 UTC+3	Khamroev 16'		Oliveira 22'; Kanazawa 29'	Stadium: Saad Al Abdullah Hall

8 October AFC Futsal Asian Cup F	Iran	2–3	Japan	Kuwait City, Kuwait
20:00 UTC+3	Ahmadabbasi 15'; Javan 40'	Report	Shimizu 16'; Oliveira 27'; Ahmadabbasi 40' (o.g.)	Stadium: Saad Al Abdullah Hall; Referee: Ryan Shepheard (Australia)

- Fixtures & Results (futsal 2022), JFA.jp

==== U-19 futsal ====
25 May 2022 2022 F.League Ocean Cup First Round	Japan	3−4	(Japan) Pescadola Machida	Tokyo, Japan
14:30	Miyashita 19', 25', 26'	Report (JFA)		Stadium: Ésforta Arena Hachiōji; Attendance: ~500

21 June 2022 2022 Futsal Week U19 Summer Cup GS Group B	Japan	10−1	Hungary	Poreč, Croatia
21:00 UTC+7	Jinkawa 1', 18'; Taguchi 4'; Miyashita 10', 35'; Nakajima 13', 28'; Ogata 17'; Harada 20', 38'	Report (JFA)	Goal 19'	Stadium: Finida Hall

22 June 2022 2022 Futsal Week U19 Summer Cup GS Group B	Ukraine	4−4	Japan	Poreč, Croatia
21:00 UTC+7	Goal 11', 13', 15', 32'	Report (JFA)	Uno 7'; Ito 9'; Taguchi 16'; Jinkawa 28'	Stadium: Finida Hall

23 June 2022 2022 Futsal Week U19 Summer Cup GS Group B	Japan	5−1	Greenland	Poreč, Croatia
18:45 UTC+7	Harada 2'; Jinkawa 9', 12', 37'; Taguchi 31'	Report (JFA)	Goal 29'	Stadium: Finida Hall

25 June 2022 2022 Futsal Week U19 Summer Cup Semi-final	Japan	6−0	Poland	Poreč, Croatia
21:00 UTC+7	Jinkawa 1'; Harada 3'; Taguchi 16'; Narita 24', 32'; Ogata 40'	Report (JFA)		Stadium: Finida Hall

26 June 2022 2022 Futsal Week U19 Summer Cup Final	Japan	2−6	Spain	Poreč, Croatia
21:00 UTC+7	Nakajima 21'; Own goal 39'	Report (JFA)	Goal 4', 15', 21', 36', 36', 38'	Stadium: Finida Hall

- Fixtures & Results (U-19 futsal 2022), JFA.jp

==== Beach soccer ====
1 November Beach Soccer Intercontinental Cup	United States	1–3	Japan	Dubai, United Arab Emirates
16:00 GST (UTC+4)	Dilbert 5'	Report (BSWW)	Okuyama 3', 7'; Oba 8'	Stadium: Kite Beach; Referee: Ibrahim Al-Raeesi (UAE)

2 November Beach Soccer Intercontinental Cup	Japan	5–8	Paraguay	Dubai, United Arab Emirates
16:00 GST (UTC+4)	Akaguma 2'; Oba 6', 25'; Kibune 22'; Matsuo 34'	Report (BSWW)	Carballo 1', 23', 30'; Martinez 9', 18'; Benitez 15'; Escobar 23'; Rolon 35'	Stadium: Kite Beach; Referee: Fallah Hassan Al-Balushi (Oman)

3 November Beach Soccer Intercontinental Cup	Iran	4–3 (a.e.t.)	Japan	Dubai, United Arab Emirates
20:00 GST (UTC+4)	Shirmohammadi 5'; Mohammadpour 15'; Behzapour 28'; Akbari 38'	Report (BSWW)	Masoumi 16' (o.g.); Akaguma 19'; Kawai 35'	Stadium: Kite Beach; Referee: Vitalij Gomolko (Lithuania)

4 November Beach Soccer Intercontinental Cup 5th–8th place play-offs	Japan	10–3	Saudi Arabia	Dubai, United Arab Emirates
17:15 GST (UTC+4)	Oba 1', 14', 16'; Ozu 4', 11'; Yamauchi 15', 28'; Akaguma 17', 18'; Uesato 33'	Report (BSWW)	Al-Youbi 9'; Al-Douarsi 11', 16'	Stadium: Kite Beach; Referee: Fallah Hassan Al-Balushi (Oman)

6 November Beach Soccer Intercontinental Cup 5th place play-offs	Japan	4–0	United States	Dubai, United Arab Emirates
17:15 GST (UTC+4)	Ozu 9'; Oba 15'; Matsuo 24'; Yamauchi 30'	Report (BSWW)		Stadium: Kite Beach; Referee: Özcan Sultanoğlu (Turkey)

9 November Neom Beach Soccer Cup GS	Japan	5–6	Oman	Neom, Saudi Arabia
14:30 AST (UTC+3)	Okuyama 1', 8'; Kawai 11'; Akaguma 31'; Shibamoto 32'	Report (BSWW)	K. Al-Araimi 2', 28', 33'; Al-Bulushi 7', 25'; M. Al-Araimi 20'	Stadium: Gayal Beach; Referee: Ibrahim Al-Raeesi (UAE)

10 November Neom Beach Soccer Cup GS	Japan	6–2	Bahrain	Neom, Saudi Arabia
14:30 AST (UTC+3)	Ozu 1', 2', 29'; Oba 14', 31'; Akaguma 24'	Report (BSWW)	Kadhem 12'; Saleem 14'	Stadium: Gayal Beach; Referee: Vitalij Gomolko (Lithuania)

11 November Neom Beach Soccer Cup GS	Brazil	8–3	Japan	Neom, Saudi Arabia
19:45 AST (UTC+3)	Mauricinho 1', 30'; Benjamin 2'; Filipe 6', 12'; Rodrigo 11'; Diogo 30'; Edson Hulk 36'	Report (BSWW)	Akaguma 3', 31'; Ozu 9'	Stadium: Gayal Beach; Referee: Ibrahim Al-Raeesi (UAE)

12 November Neom Beach Soccer Cup 5th/6th place play-offs	England	3–7	Japan	Neom, Saudi Arabia
21:00 AST (UTC+3)	Day 16', 27'; Clarke 34'	Report (BSWW)	Oba 1'; Shibamoto 4'; Ozu 18', 27'; Kibune 20'; Uesato 25'; Matsuo 32'	Stadium: Gayal Beach; Referee: Fallah Hassan Al-Balushi (Oman)

- Fixtures & Results (Beach soccer 2022), JFA.jp

==== Esports football ====
27 January FIFAe Nations Series 2022	Japan	3–3	Australia

27 January FIFAe Nations Series 2022	Singapore	3–3	Japan

28 January FIFAe Nations Series 2022	Indonesia	3–3	Japan

28 January FIFAe Nations Series 2022	Japan	1–4	India

10 March FIFAe Nations Series 2022	Japan	6–0	New Zealand

10 March FIFAe Nations Series 2022	Japan	6–0	South Korea

10 March FIFAe Nations Series 2022	Japan	1–4	Indonesia

7 April FIFAe Nations Series 2022	Japan	4–1	Indonesia

7 April FIFAe Nations Series 2022	Japan	2–2	India

8 April FIFAe Nations Series 2022	Japan	6–0	Malaysia

8 April FIFAe Nations Series 2022	Japan	3–3	Australia

27 July 2022 FIFAe Nations Cup GS Round 1	France	2–0	Japan
16:05

27 July 2022 FIFAe Nations Cup GS Round 2	Japan	0–3	Germany
16:30

27 July 2022 FIFAe Nations Cup GS Round 3	Sweden	0–0	Japan
16:55

27 July 2022 FIFAe Nations Cup GS Round 4	Japan	1–1	United Arab Emirates
17:40

27 July 2022 FIFAe Nations Cup GS Round 5	Peru	0–1	Japan
18:05

28 July 2022 FIFAe Nations Cup GS Round 6	Japan	1–4	France
16:05

28 July 2022 FIFAe Nations Cup GS Round 7	Germany	2–2	Japan
16:30

28 July 2022 FIFAe Nations Cup GS Round 8	Japan	1–3	Sweden
16:55

28 July 2022 FIFAe Nations Cup GS Round 9	United Arab Emirates	3–0	Japan
17:40

28 July 2022 FIFAe Nations Cup GS Round 10	Japan	2–0	Peru
18:05

- Fixtures & Results (2022), JFA.jp

=== Women's ===
==== Senior ====
11 November Friendly	England	4–0	Japan	Murcia, Spain
20:00 (CET)	Daly 38'; Kelly 53'; Toone 77'; Park 90+1'	Report (JFA)		Stadium: Pinatar Arena; Referee: Zuzana Valentová (Slovakia)

15 November Friendly	Spain	1–0	Japan	Sevilla, Spain
20:00 UTC+2	Redondo 9'	Report (JFA)		Stadium: Estadio La Cartuja

- Fixtures & Results (2022), JFA.jp

==== U-20 ====
11 August 2022 FIFA U-20 Women's World Cup GS	Japan	1–0	Netherlands	Alajuela, Costa Rica
14:00 CST (UTC–6)	Yamamoto 23'	Report (FIFA); Report (Soccerway)		Stadium: Estadio Alejandro Morera Soto; Attendance: 877; Referee: Akhona Makalima (South Africa)

14 August 2022 FIFA U-20 Women's World Cup GS	Japan	2–0	Ghana	Alajuela, Costa Rica
11:00 CST (UTC–6)	Hamano 63' (pen.), 72' (pen.)	Report (FIFA); Report (Soccerway)		Stadium: Estadio Alejandro Morera Soto; Attendance: 765; Referee: Maraniela Araya (Costa Rica)

17 August 2022 FIFA U-20 Women's World Cup GS	United States	1–3	Japan	Alajuela, Costa Rica
17:00 CST (UTC–6)	Jackson 70'	Report (FIFA); Report (Soccerway)	Matsukubo 55'; Koyama 67'; Tabata 84'	Stadium: Estadio Alejandro Morera Soto; Attendance: 1,392; Referee: Marta Huerta de Aza (Spain)

21 August 2022 FIFA U-20 Women's World Cup QF	Japan	3–3 (a.e.t.) (5–3 p)	France	Alajuela, Costa Rica
20:00 CST (UTC–6)	Yamamoto 33'; Hamano 48'; Fujino 120+2' (pen.)	Report (FIFA); Report (Soccerway)	Folquet 15'; Mbakem-Niaro 85'; Hoeltzel 110'	Stadium: Estadio Alejandro Morera Soto; Attendance: 2,979; Referee: Emikar Calderas (Venezuela)
	Penalties
	Oyama (penalty scored); Koyama (penalty scored); Fujino (penalty scored); Shimada (penalty scored); Tabata (penalty scored)		(penalty missed) Fazer; (penalty scored) Sombath; (penalty scored) Mbakem-Niaro; (penalty scored) Le Guilly

25 August 2022 FIFA U-20 Women's World Cup SF	Brazil	1–2	Japan	San José, Costa Rica
20:00 CST (UTC–6)	Cris 55'	Report (FIFA); Report (Soccerway)	Yamamoto 30'; Hamano 84'	Stadium: Estadio Nacional de Costa Rica; Attendance: 6,571; Referee: Tess Olofsson (Sweden)

28 August 2022 FIFA U-20 Women's World Cup F	Spain	3–1	Japan	San José, Costa Rica
20:00	Gabarro 12'; Paralluelo 22', 27' (pen.)	Report (FIFA)	Amano 47'	Stadium: Estadio Nacional de Costa Rica; Attendance: 29,891; Referee: Emikar Calderas (Venezuela)

- Fixtures & Results (WU-20), JFA.jp

==== U-17 ====
12 October 2022 FIFA U-17 Women's World Cup GS	Japan	4–0	Tanzania	Margao, India
20:00 UTC+5:30	Uno Shiragaki 33'; Mao Itamura 67'; Ai Tsujisawa 75'; Momoko Tanikawa 81'	Report		Stadium: Pandit Jawaharlal Nehru Stadium; Attendance: 3,566; Referee: Anahí Fernández (Uruguay)

15 October 2022 FIFA U-17 Women's World Cup GS	Japan	4–0	Canada	Margao, India
20:00 UTC+5:30	Mao Kubota 9'; Uno Shiragaki 37'; Momoko Tanikawa 52'; Mio Takaoka 90+2'	Report		Stadium: Pandit Jawaharlal Nehru Stadium; Attendance: 5,492; Referee: María Victoria Daza (Colombia)

18 October 2022 FIFA U-17 Women's World Cup GS	France	0–2	Japan	Margao, India
20:00 UTC+5:30		Report	Momoko Tanikawa 26'; Sayami Kusunoki 90+1'	Stadium: Pandit Jawaharlal Nehru Stadium; Attendance: 6,734; Referee: Maria Rivet (Mauritius)

22 October 2022 FIFA U-17 Women's World Cup QF	Japan	1–2	Spain	Margao, India
20:00 UTC+5:30	Momoko Tanikawa 66'	Report	Ricky Lopez 87', 90+3'	Stadium: Pandit Jawaharlal Nehru Stadium; Attendance: 6,432; Referee: Katia García (Mexico)

- Fixtures & Results (2022), JFA.jp

==== Futsal ====
20 August 2022 Friendly match	Japan	2–6	(Japan) Bardral Urayasu Tercero	Mihama-ku, Chiba
15:00 JST +09:00	Ryo Egawa 10'; Risa Ikadai 37'	Report	Goal 25', 30', 34', 36', 39', 39'	Stadium: JFA YUME Field

16 November 2022 Friendly match	CD Leganés (Spain)	3–7	Japan	Spain
21:00 CET +01:00		Report	Ikadai 3'; Yotsui 12'; Own goal 16' (o.g.); Ito 20'; Eguchi 25'; Egawa 26', 38'

17 November 2022 Friendly match	CD Alcorcón (Spain)	4–2	Japan	Spain
21:15 CET +01:00		Report	Eguchi 11', 22'

22 November 2022 Friendly match	Spain	3–2	Japan	Madrid, Spain
20:30 CET +01:00	Dany 28'; Peque 39'; Egawa 39' (o.g.)	JFA; RFEF	Eguchi 7'; Ikadai 28'	Stadium: Ciudad del Fútbol; Referee: Mayo López (Spain)

- Fixtures & Results (W futsal), JFA.jp

== League competitions ==
=== Men ===
==== Promotion and relegation ====
League	Promoted to league	Relegated from league
J1 League	Júbilo Iwata ▲; Kyoto Sanga ▲	Tokushima Vortis ▼; Oita Trinita ▼; Vegalta Sendai ▼; Yokohama FC ▼
J2 League	Roasso Kumamoto ▲; Iwate Grulla Morioka ▲	SC Sagamihara ▼; Ehime FC ▼; Giravanz Kitakyushu ▼; Matsumoto Yamaga ▼
J3 League	Iwaki FC ▲	No relegation
Japan Football League	Criacao Shinjuku ▲	FC Kariya ▼

==== J1 League ====
Pos	Team	Pld	W	D	L	GF	GA	GD	Pts	Qualification or relegation
1	Yokohama F. Marinos (C)	34	20	8	6	70	35	+35	68	Qualification for the AFC Champions League group stage
2	Kawasaki Frontale	34	20	6	8	65	42	+23	66	Qualification for the AFC Champions League group stage
3	Sanfrecce Hiroshima	34	15	10	9	52	41	+11	55	
4	Kashima Antlers	34	13	13	8	47	42	+5	52	
5	Cerezo Osaka	34	13	12	9	46	40	+6	51	
6	FC Tokyo	34	14	7	13	46	43	+3	49	
7	Kashiwa Reysol	34	13	8	13	43	44	−1	47	
8	Nagoya Grampus	34	11	13	10	30	35	−5	46	
9	Urawa Red Diamonds	34	10	15	9	48	39	+9	45	Qualification for the AFC Champions League play-off round (Note: Urawa Red Diamonds won the Champions League but did not qualify for the Champions League via league position. As a result, the last spot distributed to the third-placed team was transferred to Urawa Red Diamonds pursuant to the rules that Champions League winners would guaranteed a Champions League spot.)
10	Hokkaido Consadole Sapporo	34	11	12	11	45	55	−10	45	
11	Sagan Tosu	34	9	15	10	45	44	+1	42	
12	Shonan Bellmare	34	10	11	13	31	39	−8	41	
13	Vissel Kobe	34	11	7	16	35	41	−6	40	
14	Avispa Fukuoka	34	9	11	14	29	38	−9	38	
15	Gamba Osaka	34	9	10	15	33	44	−11	37	
16	Kyoto Sanga (O)	34	8	12	14	30	38	−8	36	Qualification for relegation playoffs
17	Shimizu S-Pulse (R)	34	7	12	15	44	54	−10	33	Relegation to the J2 League
18	Júbilo Iwata (R)	34	6	12	16	32	57	−25	30	Relegation to the J2 League

Source: J.League Data Site
Rules for classification: 1) Points; 2) Goal difference; 3) Goals scored; 4) Head-to-head points; 5) Head-to-head goal difference; 6) Head-to-head goals scored; 7) Fewer disciplinary points.
(C) Champions; (O) Play-off winners; (R) Relegated

==== J2 League ====
Pos	Team	Pld	W	D	L	GF	GA	GD	Pts	Promotion or relegation
1	Albirex Niigata (C, P)	42	25	9	8	73	35	+38	84	Promotion to the J1 League
2	Yokohama FC (P)	42	23	11	8	66	49	+17	80	Promotion to the J1 League
3	Fagiano Okayama	42	20	12	10	61	42	+19	72	Qualification for the promotion play-offs
4	Roasso Kumamoto	42	18	13	11	58	48	+10	67	Qualification for the promotion play-offs
5	Oita Trinita	42	17	15	10	62	52	+10	66	Qualification for the promotion play-offs
6	Montedio Yamagata	42	17	13	12	62	40	+22	64	Qualification for the promotion play-offs
7	Vegalta Sendai	42	18	9	15	67	59	+8	63	
8	Tokushima Vortis	42	13	23	6	48	35	+13	62	
9	Tokyo Verdy	42	16	13	13	62	55	+7	61	
10	JEF United Chiba	42	17	10	15	44	42	+2	61	
11	V-Varen Nagasaki	42	15	11	16	50	54	−4	56	
12	Blaublitz Akita	42	15	11	16	39	46	−7	56	
13	Mito HollyHock	42	14	12	16	47	46	+1	54	
14	Zweigen Kanazawa	42	13	13	16	56	69	−13	52	
15	Machida Zelvia	42	14	9	19	51	50	+1	51	
16	Renofa Yamaguchi	42	13	11	18	51	54	−3	50	
17	Tochigi SC	42	11	16	15	32	40	−8	49	
18	Ventforet Kofu (X)	42	11	15	16	47	54	−7	48	Qualification for the AFC Champions League group stage (Note: Qualified as the 2022 Emperor's Cup winners.)
19	Omiya Ardija	42	10	13	19	48	64	−16	43	
20	Thespakusatsu Gunma	42	11	9	22	36	57	−21	42	
21	FC Ryukyu (R)	42	8	13	21	41	65	−24	37	Relegation to J3 League
22	Iwate Grulla Morioka (R)	42	9	7	26	35	80	−45	34	Relegation to J3 League

Source: Meiji Yasuda J2 League, J.League Data Site
Rules for classification: 1) Points; 2) Goal difference; 3) Goals scored; 4) Head-to-head points; 5) Head-to-head goal difference; 6) Head-to-head goal scored; 7) Fair-play points.
(C) Champions; (P) Promoted; (R) Relegated; (X) Qualified for the AFC Champions League.

==== J3 League ====
Pos	Team	Pld	W	D	L	GF	GA	GD	Pts	Promotion
1	Iwaki FC (C, P)	34	23	7	4	72	23	+49	76	Promotion to the J2 League (Note: Only teams that hold a J2 license are eligible for promotion.)
2	Fujieda MYFC (P)	34	20	7	7	58	29	+29	67	Promotion to the J2 League
3	Kagoshima United	34	21	3	10	55	39	+16	66	
4	Matsumoto Yamaga	34	20	6	8	46	33	+13	66	
5	FC Imabari	34	18	6	10	55	40	+15	60	
6	Kataller Toyama	34	19	3	12	55	48	+7	60	
7	Ehime FC	34	14	10	10	51	41	+10	52	
8	Nagano Parceiro	34	14	10	10	42	41	+1	52	
9	Tegevajaro Miyazaki (Note: The team hold neither a J1 nor J2 license, and so are ineligible for promotion to the J2 League.)	34	12	10	12	45	47	−2	46	
10	Vanraure Hachinohe	34	14	1	19	32	46	−14	43	
11	Fukushima United	34	11	9	14	37	45	−8	42	
12	Gainare Tottori	34	12	5	17	55	56	−1	41	
13	Giravanz Kitakyushu	34	11	7	16	41	45	−4	40	
14	FC Gifu	34	10	7	17	43	53	−10	37	
15	Azul Claro Numazu	34	8	7	19	27	46	−19	31	
16	YSCC Yokohama	34	8	4	22	25	66	−41	28	
17	Kamatamare Sanuki	34	6	9	19	27	49	−22	27	
18	SC Sagamihara	34	6	7	21	31	50	−19	25	

Source: Meiji Yasuda J3 League, J.League Data Site
Rules for classification: 1) Points; 2) Goal difference; 3) Head-to-head points; 4) Head-to-head goal difference; 5) Head-to-head goal scored; 6) Number of wins; 7) Goals scored; 8) Fair-play points
(C) Champions; (P) Promoted

==== Japan Football League (JFL) ====
Pos	Team	Pld	W	D	L	GF	GA	GD	Pts	Promotion or qualification
1	**Nara Club** (Note: J.League 100 Year Plan clubs) (C, P)	30	16	11	3	48	25	+23	59	Promotion to 2023 J3 League (Note: Promotion is conditional on holding a valid J3 license (marked in bold in the table), finishing the season in the top 4 of the JFL, and finishing in the top 2 out of the J.League 100 Year Plan clubs. Average home attendance of at least 2,000 is also required.)
2	**FC Osaka** (P)	30	17	8	5	47	34	+13	59	Promotion to 2023 J3 League
3	Honda FC	30	16	8	6	47	23	+24	56	
4	**ReinMeer Aomori**	30	14	9	7	35	23	+12	51	
5	Maruyasu Okazaki	30	14	7	9	48	34	+14	49	
6	Tokyo Musashino United	30	14	6	10	49	33	+16	48	
7	**Veertien Mie**	30	12	9	9	43	29	+14	45	
8	**Verspah Oita**	30	12	7	11	40	44	−4	43	
9	Suzuka Point Getters	30	12	5	13	31	40	−9	41	
10	Honda Lock	30	10	6	14	33	33	0	36	
11	**Kochi United**	30	9	7	14	30	39	−9	34	
12	Kagura Shimane	30	9	7	14	32	42	−10	34	Folded (Note: Withdrew after the end of the season.)
13	Tiamo Hirakata	30	9	5	16	40	50	−10	32	
14	Sony Sendai	30	5	13	12	23	39	−16	28	
15	Criacao Shinjuku	30	6	6	18	30	52	−22	24	
16	MIO Biwako Shiga	30	5	6	19	21	57	−36	21	

Source: JFL Official Website (in Japanese)
Rules for classification: 1) Points; 2) Goal difference; 3) goals scored; 4) Head-to-head Results (a. Points, b. Goal difference, c. Goals scored); 5) Number of wins; 6) Disciplinary points; 7) Play-off (if necessary)
(C) Champions; (P) Promoted

=== Women ===
==== Promotion and relegation ====
League	Promoted to league	Relegated from league
WE League	No promotion	No relegation
Nadeshiko League Division 1		
Nadeshiko League Division 2		

==== WE League ====
Pos	Team	Pld	W	D	L	GF	GA	GD	Pts	Qualification or relegation
1	INAC Kobe Leonessa	20	16	2	2	35	9	+26	50	League Winner
2	Urawa Red Diamonds	20	13	3	4	40	24	+16	42	
3	Tokyo Verdy Beleza	20	10	4	6	32	18	+14	34	
4	JEF United Chiba	20	9	7	4	26	18	+8	34	
5	Mynavi Sendai	20	9	4	7	25	16	+9	31	
6	Sanfrecce Hiroshima Regina	20	7	4	9	24	26	−2	25	
7	AC Nagano Parceiro	20	5	6	9	15	24	−9	21	
8	Albirex Niigata	20	4	7	9	20	30	−10	19	
9	Omiya Ardija Ventus	20	3	9	8	17	31	−14	18	
10	Nojima Stella Kanagawa	20	2	7	11	13	31	−18	13	
11	AS Elfen Saitama	20	2	7	11	13	33	−20	13	

Source: WE League, WE League Data Site
Rules for classification: 1) Points; 2) Goal difference; 3) Number of goals scored.

==== Nadeshiko League ====
===== Division 1 =====
Pos	Team	Pld	W	D	L	GF	GA	GD	Pts	Promotion or relegation
1	Sfida Setagaya FC (C)	22	16	2	4	45	16	+29	50	
2	Iga Kunoichi	22	14	4	4	37	18	+19	46	
3	AS Harima Albion	22	13	4	5	46	23	+23	43	
4	Cerezo Osaka (P)	22	11	5	6	46	25	+21	38	Promoted to 2023–24 WE League
5	Orca Kamogawa FC	22	11	3	8	26	20	+6	36	
6	NGU Loveledge Nagoya	22	10	6	6	27	24	+3	36	
7	Nippon Sport Science University Fields Yokohama	22	9	2	11	19	28	−9	29	
8	NHK Spring Yokohama FC Seagulls	22	7	6	9	24	26	−2	27	
9	Bunnys Gunma FC White Star	22	7	4	11	21	40	−19	25	
10	Speranza Osaka-Takatsuki	22	3	7	12	13	34	−21	16	
11	Ehime FC Ladies	22	2	7	13	18	32	−14	13	
12	Ange Violet Hiroshima	22	3	2	17	10	46	−36	11	Disbanding after this season

Source: Nadeshiko League
Rules for classification: 1) Points; 2) Goal difference; 3) Number of goals scored; 4) Head-to-head points; 5) Head-to-head goal difference; 6) Head-to-head away goals scored
(C) Champions; (P) Promoted

===== Division 2 =====
Pos	Team	Pld	W	D	L	GF	GA	GD	Pts	Qualification or relegation
1	Shizuoka SSU Asregina (C, P)	18	13	4	1	37	15	+22	43	Promotion to the 2023 Nadeshiko League Division 1
2	JFA Academy Fukushima (Note: After two teams are leaving from Division 1, a promotion-relegation playoff between Divisions 1 and 2 has been cancelled, no team from Division 1 will be relegated, and top two teams from Division 2 will promote to Division 1. However, since the second-placed team (JFA Academy Fukushima) is not eligible for promoting to Division 1, the third-placed team (Yamato Sylphid) is to promote to Division 1 instead.)	18	12	5	1	47	17	+30	41	
3	Yamato Sylphid (P)	18	10	5	3	37	20	+17	35	Promotion to the 2023 Nadeshiko League Division 1
4	Diavorosso Hiroshima	18	7	6	5	24	18	+6	27	
5	Kibi International University Charme Okayama Takahashi	18	4	6	8	13	22	−9	18	
6	Fukuoka J. Anclas	18	4	6	8	14	29	−15	18	
7	Norddea Hokkaido	18	3	7	8	16	28	−12	16	
8	Tsukuba FC Ladies	18	2	8	8	12	28	−16	14	
9	Veertien Mie Ladies	18	2	7	9	14	21	−7	13	
10	Okayama Yunogo Belle (O)	18	1	10	7	14	30	−16	13	Qualification for the promotion relegation play-offs

Source: Nadeshiko League
Rules for classification: 1) Points; 2) Goal difference; 3) Number of goals scored; 4) Head-to-head points; 5) Head-to-head goal difference; 6) Head-to-head away goals scored
(C) Champions; (O) Play-off winners; (P) Promoted

===== Division 2 promotion-relegation play-offs =====
The top three teams from regional league qualifiers (1st: FC Fujizakura Yamanashi, 2nd: Diosa Izumo FC, 3rd: Viamaterras Miyazaki) and the lowest-ranked team from Division 2 (Okayama Yunogo Belle) played a round-robin tournament. The top three teams of the round-robin were to join Division 2 next year.

Pos	Team	Pld	W	D	L	GF	GA	GD	Pts	Qualification or relegation
1	Viamaterras Miyazaki (P)	3	3	0	0	11	1	+10	**9**	Promotion to 2023 Nadeshiko League Division 2
2	FC Fujizakura Yamanashi (P)	3	2	0	1	4	4	0	**6**	Promotion to 2023 Nadeshiko League Division 2
3	Okayama Yunogo Belle	3	1	0	2	5	11	−6	**3**	Remained in Nadeshiko League Division 2
4	Diosa Izumo FC	3	0	0	3	3	7	−4	**0**	

Source: Nadeshiko League (in Japanese)
Rules for classification: 1) Points; 2) Head-to-head points; 3) Head-to-head goal difference; 4) Head-to-head goals scored; 5) Goal difference; 6) Number of goals scored; 7) Disciplinary points for yellow and red cards
(P) Promoted

== Cup competitions ==
=== Men ===
==== Fujifilm Super Cup ====
===== Final =====
12 February 2022
13:35 JST

Kawasaki Frontale	0–2	Urawa Red Diamonds
	JLeague.co (EN); JLeague.jp (JA)	Esaka 7', 81'

Nissan Stadium, Yokohama
Attendance: 18,558
Referee: Hiroki Kasahara

==== J.League YBC Levain Cup ====
===== Final =====
12 February 2022
13:35 JST

Kawasaki Frontale	0–2	Urawa Red Diamonds
	JLeague.co (EN); JLeague.jp (JA)	Esaka 7', 81'

Nissan Stadium, Yokohama
Attendance: 18,558
Referee: Hiroki Kasahara

=== Women ===
==== WE League Cup ====
1 October 2022
16:00 JST

Urawa Red Diamonds Ladies	3–3	Nippon TV Tokyo Verdy Beleza
Seike 75'; Ando 76'; Sugasawa 84'	Report (WE League)	Ueki 25', 29'; Muramatsu 72'
Penalties
Sugasawa (penalty scored); Shiokoshi (penalty scored); Naomoto (penalty scored); Seike (penalty scored)	4–2	(penalty scored) Ueki; (penalty scored) Utsugi; (penalty missed) Miura; (penalty missed) Fujino

Ajinomoto Field Nishigaoka, Kita, Tokyo
Attendance: 3,546
Referee: Asaka Koizumi

== Deaths ==
- 7 January 2022: Tadatoshi Komine, 76, who managed Shimabara Shogyo High School, Kunimi High School, Nagasaki Institute of Applied Science High School and Japan national under-17 football team.

== See also ==
- Japan Football Association (JFA)
