= 2023 Nadeshiko League =

Nadeshiko League Division 1
- Season: 2023
- Dates: 18 March – 9 October 2023
- Champions: Orca Kamogawa FC (1st title)
- Matches: 22
- Top goalscorer: Chiina Kamiya (14 goals)

Nadeshiko League Division 2
- Season: 2023
- Dates: 1 April – 15 October 2023
- Champions: Viamaterras Miyazaki (1st title)
- Matches: 18
- Top goalscorer: Akane Saito (23 goals)

The 2023 Nadeshiko League was the 35th season of the Nadeshiko League, the second or third-tier leagues for women's association football in Japan. It was also the 19th season in its current format.

== Teams ==
=== Division 1 ===
Team	Coach	Location	2022 season
Bunnys Gunma	Tsutomu Kobayashi	Maebashi, Gunma	Div.1 9th
Orca Kamogawa	Akemi Noda	Chiba, Chiba	Div.1 5th
Sfida Setagaya	Akihiko Kamikawa	Setagaya, Tokyo	Div.1 1st
Nittaidai	Shigehisa Otsuki	Sagamihara, Kanagawa	Div.1 7th
Yokohama FC Seagulls	Mihoko Ishida	Yokohama, Kanagawa	Div.1 8th
Yamato Sylphid	Kazuyuki Takahashi	Yamato, Kanagawa	Div.2 3rd ▲ (promoted)
Shizuoka SSU Bonita	Takashi Ogawa	Iwata, Shizuoka	Div.2 1st ▲ (promoted)
NGU Loveledge Nagoya	Yasuyuki Moriyama	Nagoya, Aichi	Div.1 6th
Iga FC	Ryuji Kitamura	Iga, Mie	Div.1 2nd
Speranza Osaka	Kaori Taneda	Takahashi, Okayama	Div.1 10th
AS Harima Albion	Suzuka Ono	Himeji, Hyōgo	Div.1 3rd
Ehime FC	Takanobu Tokunaga	Matsuyama, Ehime	Div.1 11th

=== Division 2 ===
Team	Coach	Location	2022 season
Norddea Hokkaido	Ryuichi Yoneyama (footballer)	Sapporo, Hokkaido	5th
Tsukuba FC Ladies	Sou Hakuba	Tsukuba, Ibaraki	6th
FC Fujizakura Yamanashi	Kai Watanabe	Narusawa, Yamanashi	Tōkai Div.1 5th ▲
JFA Academy Fukushima	Takafumi Yamaguchi	Kobe, Hyōgo	1st
Veertien Mie Ladies	Kenichi Sadakiyo	Sendai, Miyagi	Tōkai Div.1 5th ▲
Okayama Yunogo Belle	Hiroshi Taniguchi	Mimasaka, Okayama	8th
KIU Charme	Shinji Ota	Takahashi, Okayama	7th
Diavorosso Hiroshima	Junji Iwata	Hiroshima, Hiroshima	Chūgoku Div.2 1st ▲
Fukuoka J. Anclas	Mie Kawashima	Fukuoka, Fukuoka	4th
Viamaterras Miyazaki	Shoma Mizunaga	Shintomi, Miyazaki	4th

== League table ==
=== Division 1 ===
Pos	Team	Pld	W	D	L	GF	GA	GD	Pts
1	Yokohama FC Seagulls	11	8	2	1	22	11	+11	26
2	Orca Kamogawa	11	7	2	2	20	9	+11	23
3	NGU Loveledge Nagoya	11	6	2	3	18	10	+8	20
4	Iga Kunoichi Mie	11	5	4	2	20	7	+13	19
5	AS Harima Albion	11	5	4	2	16	14	+2	19
6	Sfida Setagaya	11	4	5	2	16	11	+5	17
7	Nittaidai	11	4	3	4	18	15	+3	15
8	Ehime FC	11	2	5	4	12	16	−4	11
9	Bunnys Gunma	11	2	5	4	12	17	−5	11
10	Shizuoka SSU Bonita	11	2	2	7	12	22	−10	8
11	Yamato Sylphid	11	2	2	7	11	33	−22	8
12	Speranza Osaka	11	1	0	10	9	21	−12	3

Updated to match(es) played on 28 May 2023. Source: Nadeshiko League
Rules for classification: 1) Points; 2) Goal difference; 3) Number of goals scored; 4) Head-to-head points; 5) Head-to-head goal difference; 6) Head-to-head away goals scored

=== Division 2 ===
Pos	Team	Pld	W	D	L	GF	GA	GD	Pts
1	Viamaterras Miyazaki	10	8	2	0	44	4	+40	26
2	JFA Academy Fukushima	10	6	2	2	17	6	+11	20
3	Fukuoka J. Anclas	10	6	2	2	10	13	−3	20
4	Okayama Yunogo Belle	10	4	3	3	28	16	+12	15
5	Tsukuba FC	10	4	2	4	13	14	−1	14
6	FC Fujizakura Yamanashi	10	3	4	3	10	10	0	13
7	Veertien Mie	10	3	3	4	7	9	−2	12
8	KIU Charme	10	2	4	4	12	15	−3	10
9	Diavorosso Hiroshima	10	1	3	6	3	31	−28	6
10	Norddea Hokkaido	10	0	1	9	2	28	−26	1

Updated to match(es) played on 4 June 2023. Source: Nadeshiko League
Rules for classification: 1) Points; 2) Goal difference; 3) Number of goals scored; 4) Head-to-head points; 5) Head-to-head goal difference; 6) Head-to-head away goals scored

== Season statistics ==
=== Top scorers ===
==== Division 1 ====
As of 28 May 2023.

Rank	Player	Club	Goals
1	(Japan) Yuna Katayama	Yokohama FC Seagulls	10
2	(Japan) Misuzu Uchida	AS Harima Albion	9
3	(Japan) Kana Shinbori	Sfida Setagaya	6
3	(Japan) Hinano Hirata	Iga FC Kunoichi Mie	6
5	(Japan) Chiina Kamiya	Asahi Intecc Loveledge Nagoya	5
5	(Japan) Shiho Ogawa	Iga FC Kunoichi Mie	5
7	(Japan) Risa Urashima	Orca Kamogawa	4
7	(Japan) Haruhi Suzuki	Orca Kamogawa	4
7	(Japan) Ami Kitazawa	Nittaidai SMG Yokohama	4
7	(Japan) Mayu Kaneko	Nittaidai SMG Yokohama	4
7	(Japan) Akari Kurata	Yokohama FC Seagulls	4
7	(Japan) Runa Shioya	Bunnys Gunma	4

==== Division 2 ====
As of 4 June 2023.

Rank	Player	Club	Goals
1	(Japan) Akane Saito	Viamaterras Miyazaki	18
2	(Japan) Kumi Yokoyama	Okayama Yunogo Belle	11
3	(Japan) Mao Itamura	JFA Academy Fukushima	7
4	(Japan) Miyuu Sakata	Viamaterras Miyazaki	6
4	(Japan) Konomi Uchida	Okayama Yunogo Belle	6
6	(Japan) Saya Wakita	FC Fujizakura Yamanashi	5
6	(Japan) Riho Sakamoto	Viamaterras Miyazaki	5
8	(Japan) Mizuki Akamine	Tsukuba FC	4
9	(Japan) Karin Naito	Tsukuba FC	3
9	(Japan) Momoko Tanikawa	JFA Academy Fukushima	3
9	(Japan) Suzu Katanoda	Veertien Mie	3
9	(Japan) Yurina Furutani	KIU Charme Okayama Takahashi	3
9	(Japan) Kaede Itakura	KIU Charme Okayama Takahashi	3
9	(Japan) Rina Koyama	Fukuoka J. Anclas	3
9	(Japan) Shiori Yanagita	Fukuoka J. Anclas	3
9	(Japan) Ayako Shimada	Viamaterras Miyazaki	3
9	(Japan) Yuka Toriumi	Okayama Yunogo Belle	3

== See also ==
- Japan Football Association (JFA)
  - 2023 in Japanese football
    - 2022–23 WE League season
    - 2023 Empress's Cup
    - 2022–23 WE League Cup
