= 2021 Empress's Cup =

Football tournament season

- Dates: 27 November 2021 – 27 February 2022

Final positions
- Champions: Urawa Red Diamonds (1st title)
- Runners-up: JEF United Chiba

Tournament statistics
- Matches played: 47

The 2021 Empress's Cup was the 43rd season of the Japanese women's football main cup competition.

== Calendar and schedule ==
Below are the dates for each round as given by the official schedule:

| Round | Date(s) | Number of fixtures | Clubs |
|---|---|---|---|
| First Round | 27 & 28 November 2021 | 17 | 34 → 17 |
| Second round | 4 & 5 December 2021 | 10 | 20 (17+3) → 10 |
| Third round | 11 & 12 December 2021 | 5 | 10 → 5 |
| Round of 16 | 25 December 2021 | 8 | 16 (11+5) → 8 |
| Quarter-finals | 29 December 2021 | 4 | 8 → 4 |
| Semi-finals | 5 January 2022 | 2 | 4 → 2 |
| Final | 27 February 2022 | 1 | 2 → 1 |

=== First round ===
| No. | Home | Score | Away |
|---|---|---|---|
| 1 | Veertien Mie | 0–1 | University of Tsukuba |
| 2 | Yamato Sylphid | 0–0 (0–3 pen.) | Tokuyama University |
| 3 | Diavorosso Hiroshima | 0–1 | Fukuoka J. Anclas |
| 4 | Otemon Gakuen High School | 3–6 | Japan Soccer College |
| 5 | Speranza Osaka-Takatsuki | 3–1 | Kanagawa University |
| 6 | Norddea Hokkaido | 0–3 | Fujieda Junshin High School |
| 7 | Ehime FC | 0–3 | JFA Academy Fukushima |
| 8 | Shizuoka SSU Bonita | 2–2 (10–9 pen.) | Fujizakura Yamanashi |
| 9 | Yokohama FC Seagulls | 8–0 | Hokkaido Bunkyo University High School |
| 10 | Orca Kamogawa | 4–0 | Osaka University of Health and Sport Sciences |
| 11 | Waseda University | 4–0 | SGU Kagawa Nishi High School |
| 12 | Ange Violet Hiroshima | 3–1 | JEF United Chiba U-18 |
| 13 | Viamaterras Miyazaki | 1–2 | Diosa Izumo |
| 14 | Nittaidai SMG Yokohama | 0–1 | SEISA OSA Rhea Shonan |
| 15 | KIU Charme Okayama | 1–2 | Tokyo Verdy Menina |
| 16 | AS Harima Albion | 5–0 | Sendai University |
| 17 | NGU Loveledge Nagoya | 4–1 | Tokai University Fukuoka High School |

=== Second round ===
| No. | Home | Score | Away |
|---|---|---|---|
| 18 | Iga FC Kunoichi | 4–0 | University of Tsukuba |
| 19 | Tokuyama University | 0–2 | Fukuoka J. Anclas |
| 20 | Cerezo Osaka Sakai | 8–0 | Japan Soccer College |
| 21 | Speranza Osaka-Takatsuki | 2–3 | Fujieda Junshin High School |
| 22 | JFA Academy Fukushima | 0–0 (4–5 pen.) | Shizuoka SSU Bonita |
| 23 | NHK Spring Yokohama FC Seagulls | 0–1 | Orca Kamogawa |
| 24 | Sfida Setagaya | 1–0 | Waseda University |
| 25 | Ange Violet Hiroshima | 3–0 | Diosa Izumo |
| 26 | SEISA OSA Rhea Shonan | 1–5 | Tokyo Verdy Menina |
| 27 | AS Harima Albion | 4–1 | NGU Loveledge Nagoya |

=== Third round ===
| No. | Home | Score | Away |
|---|---|---|---|
| 28 | Iga FC Kunoichi | 7–0 | Fukuoka J. Anclas |
| 29 | Cerezo Osaka Sakai | 4–0 | Fujieda Junshin High School |
| 30 | Shizuoka SSU Bonita | 0–1 | Orca Kamogawa |
| 31 | Sfida Setagaya | 2–1 | Ange Violet Hiroshima |
| 32 | Nippon TV Tokyo Verdy Menina | 2–1 | AS Harima Albion |

=== Round of 16 ===
| No. | Home | Score | Away |
|---|---|---|---|
| 33 | Sanfrecce Hiroshima Regina | 2–0 | MyNavi Sendai |
| 34 | Urawa Red Diamonds | 1–0 | Iga FC Kunoichi |
| 35 | Chifure AS Elfen Saitama | 0–2 | Albirex Niigata |
| 36 | Nojima Stella Kanagawa Sagamihara | 2–3 | Cerezo Osaka Sakai |
| 37 | Nagano Parceiro | 0–4 | Tokyo Verdy Beleza |
| 38 | JEF United Chiba | 1–0 | Orca Kamogawa |
| 39 | Omiya Ardija Ventus | 2–1 | Sfida Setagaya |
| 40 | INAC Kobe Leonessa | 1–2 | Tokyo Verdy Menina |

=== Quarter-finals ===
| No. | Home | Score | Away |
|---|---|---|---|
| 41 | Sanfrecce Hiroshima Regina | 0–2 | Urawa Red Diamonds |
| 42 | Albirex Niigata | 0–1 | Cerezo Osaka Sakai |
| 43 | Tokyo Verdy Beleza | 0–3 | JEF United Chiba |
| 44 | Omiya Ardija Ventus | 0–4 | Tokyo Verdy Menina |

=== Semi-finals ===
| No. | Home | Score | Away |
|---|---|---|---|
| 45 | Urawa Red Diamonds | 1−0 | Cerezo Osaka Sakai |
| 46 | JEF United Chiba | 1−0 | Tokyo Verdy Menina |

=== Final ===
27 February 2022
14:00

| Urawa Red Diamonds | 1−0 | JEF United Chiba |
|---|---|---|
| Yuika Sugasawa 67' | Report (JFA) |

Sanga Stadium by Kyocera, Kameoka, Kyoto
Attendance: 1,375
Referee: Emi Chiba
