= Shiho Ogawa =

Japanese footballer (born 1988)

Shiho Ogawa 小川 志保
Personal information
- Full name: Shiho Ogawa
- Date of birth: December 26, 1988 (age 37)
- Place of birth: Kashima, Ibaraki, Japan
- Height: 1.66 m (5 ft 5 1/2 in)
- Position: Forward

Team information
- Current team: Iga FC Kunoichi Mie
- Number: 11

Senior career*
Years	Team	Apps	(Gls)
2007–2009	JEF United Chiba	7	(2)
2010–2011	INAC Kobe Leonessa	12	(1)
2012–2013	JEF United Chiba	24	(4)
2014–	Iga FC Kunoichi Mie	72	(8)
Total		115	(15)

International career
2013	Japan	3	(0)
Medal record
INAC Kobe Leonessa
Winner	Nadeshiko League	2011
Winner	Empress's Cup	2010
Winner	Empress's Cup	2011
JEF United Chiba
Runner-up	Empress's Cup	2012
- * Club domestic league appearances and goals as of December 31, 2018

Shiho Ogawa (小川 志保, Ogawa Shiho; born December 26, 1988) is a Japanese football player. She plays for Iga FC Kunoichi Mie. She played for Japan national team.

== Early life ==
Ogawa was born in Kashima on December 26, 1988.

== Career ==
After graduating from high school, she joined JEF United Chiba in 2007. In 2010, she moved to INAC Kobe Leonessa. In 2012, she returned to JEF United Chiba. In 2014, she moved to Iga FC Kunoichi.

=== National team ===
In March 2013, Ogawa was picked in the Japan national team for the 2013 Algarve Cup. At this competition, on March 6, she debuted against Norway. She played 3 games for Japan in 2013.

== Statistics ==
Japan national team
Year	Apps	Goals
2013	3	0
Total	3	0
