= Akane Saito =

Japanese footballer

Akane Saito 齊藤 あかね
Personal information
- Full name: Akane Saito
- Date of birth: January 12, 1993 (age 33)
- Place of birth: Saitama, Japan
- Height: 1.67 m (5 ft 5 1/2 in)
- Position: Midfielder

Team information
- Current team: AC Nagano Parceiro
- Number: 11

Youth career
- Tokiwagi Gakuen High School LSC

Senior career*
Years	Team	Apps	(Gls)
????–2011	TEPCO Mareeze		
2011–2014	Urawa Reds	42	(4)
2015–	AC Nagano Parceiro	0	(0)

International career
2008	Japan U-17	3	(0)
2010	Japan U-20	1	(0)
2011	Japan	1	(0)
Medal record
Urawa Reds
Winner	Nadeshiko League	2014
Runner-up	Empress's Cup	2014
Representing Japan
AFC U-19 Women's Championship
Gold medal – first place	2009 China
Gold medal – first place	2011 Vietnam
AFC U-16 Women's Championship
Silver medal – second place	2007 Malaysia
- * Club domestic league appearances and goals

Akane Saito (齊藤 あかね, Saitō Akane; born January 12, 1993) is a Japanese footballer who plays as a midfielder. She plays for AC Nagano Parceiro and has previously played for the Japan national team.

== Club career ==
Saito was born in Saitama Prefecture on January 12, 1993. She played for TEPCO Mareeze. However, the club was disbanded for Fukushima Daiichi nuclear disaster in 2011. In April 2011, she moved to her local club Urawa Reds. She moved to AC Nagano Parceiro in 2015.

== National team career ==
In October 2008, Saito was selected Japan U-17 national team for 2008 U-17 Women's World Cup. In July 2010, she was selected Japan U-20 national team for 2010 U-20 World Cup. In March 2011, she was selected Japan national team for 2011 Algarve Cup. At this competition, on March 9, she debuted against Sweden.

== National team statistics ==
Japan national team
Year	Apps	Goals
2011	1	0
Total	1	0
