= Mitsuba Ibaraki =

Japanese association football player

Personal information
- Date of birth: 7 May 1998 (age 28)
- Place of birth: Kumamoto Prefecture, Japan
- Height: 1.56 m (5 ft 1 in)
- Position: Midfielder

Team information
- Current team: MyNavi Sendai
- Number: 14

Senior career*
Years	Team	Apps	(Gls)
2021-2022	Albirex Niigata	19	(1)
2022-	MyNavi Sendai		
- * Club domestic league appearances and goals

Mitsuba Ibaraki (born 7 May 1998) is a Japanese professional footballer who plays as a midfielder for WE League club MyNavi Sendai.

== Club career ==
Ibaraki made her WE League debut on 12 September 2021.
