= 2024–25 WE League Cup =

2024-25 WE League
Tournament details
- Country: Japan
- Venue: Japan National Stadium (Final)
- Dates: 31 August – 29 December 2024
- Teams: 12

The 2024–25 WE League Cup was the 3rd edition of the WE League Cup, a women's football cup tournament.

The final was played between Sanfrecce Hiroshima Regina and Inac Kobe Leonessa on 29 December 2024 at the Japan National Stadium.

Sanfrecce Hiroshima Regina won 1-0 and became the first team to successfully defend the title.
