= Fukina Mizuno =

Japanese footballer

Personal information
- Date of birth: 31 January 2001 (age 25)
- Place of birth: Kyoto Prefecture, Japan
- Height: 1.60 m (5 ft 3 in)
- Positions: Midfielder; defender

Team information
- Current team: INAC Kobe Leonessa
- Number: 24

Youth career
- 2016–2018: Otemon Gakuin

Senior career*
Years	Team	Apps	(Gls)
2019–	INAC Kobe Leonessa	53	(7)

International career
2019	Japan U-19	2	(0)
2026-	Japan	4	(0)
- * Club domestic league appearances and goals

Fukina Mizuno (born 31 January 2001) is a Japanese professional footballer who plays as a midfielder for WE League club INAC Kobe Leonessa.

== Career ==
After graduation from (Otemon Gakuin), Fukina Mizuno joined INAC Kobe Leonessa in 2019. She was also selected into the U19 Japan National Football team and played in the 2019 AFC U-19 Women's Championship.

In season 2020–2021, Mizuno was awarded the Nadeshiko League Division 1 Rookie of the Year.

In the inaugural 2021–2022 season of the WE League, she contributed to the team's championship by playing in 16 matches. In 2022, she was selected as one of the top five crossers in the WE League.

However, she suffered from torn anterior cruciate ligament in December 2022. The injury caused her to miss much of season 2022–2023. In September 2024, Mizuno fully recovered from her injury and started playing for INAC Kobe, scoring goal in her first appearance in the season. Sun Television described the match as "Mizuno's resurrection".

In season 2024–2025, Mizuno scored decisive goals and assists, and was voted into the list of best players of the year in the WE League Award by players and coaches of the 12 league teams.

In season 2025-2026, Mizuno was selected as the best offensive player in WE League in April and May 2026. She was also selected as one of the outstanding players in WE League for the season.
