= Yume Takikawa =

Japanese association football player

Personal information
- Date of birth: 31 August 1999 (age 27)
- Place of birth: Mie Prefecture, Japan
- Height: 1.53 m (5 ft 0 in)
- Position: Midfielder

Team information
- Current team: Albirex Niigata
- Number: 17

Senior career*
Years	Team	Apps	(Gls)
2021–	Albirex Niigata	50	(13)

International career^{‡}
2025–	Japan	1	(1)
- * Club domestic league appearances and goals as of 22 December 2024 ‡ National team caps and goals as of 9 July 2025

Yume Takikawa (born 31 August 1999) is a Japanese professional footballer who plays as a midfielder for WE League club Albirex Niigata Ladies.

== Club career ==
Takikawa made her WE League debut on 12 September 2021.

== International career ==
On 9 July 2025, she made her debut for Japan and also scored her first international goal at 2025 EAFF E-1 Football Championship in South Korea against Chinese Taipei.

=== International goals ===
List of international goals scored by Miyu Yakata
No.	Date	Venue	Opponent	Score	Result	Competition
1.	9 July 2025	Suwon World Cup Stadium, Suwon, South Korea	Chinese Taipei	2–0	4–0	2025 EAFF E-1 Football Championship
