= Ami Sugita =

Japanese footballer

Ami Sugita 杉田 亜未
Personal information
- Full name: Ami Sugita
- Date of birth: March 14, 1992 (age 34)
- Place of birth: Zama, Kanagawa, Japan
- Height: 1.56 m (5 ft 1 1/2 in)
- Position: Midfielder

Team information
- Current team: Albirex Niigata
- Number: 13

Youth career
- 2007–2009: Shonan Gakuin High School
- 2010–2013: Kibi International University

Senior career*
Years	Team	Apps	(Gls)
2014–2021	Iga FC Kunoichi Mie	101	(27)
2022–2023	Nojima Stella	11	(3)
2023–	Albirex Niigata		
Total		112	(30)

International career
2014–2022	Japan	8	(2)
Medal record
Representing Japan
AFC Women's Asian Cup
Gold medal – first place	2014 Vietnam
- * Club domestic league appearances and goals as of December 31, 2018

Ami Sugita (杉田 亜未, Sugita Ami; born March 14, 1992) is a Japanese football player. She plays for Albirex Niigata in Japan's WE League. She played for Japan's national team.

== Club career ==
Sugita was born in Zama on March 14, 1992. After graduating from Kibi International University, she joined Iga FC Kunoichi in 2014.

== National team career ==
In May 2014, Sugita was picked in the Japan national team for 2014 Asian Cup. At this competition, on May 18, she debuted against Jordan. Japan won the championship. Until 2017, she had played 6 games and scored 2 goals for Japan.

== National team statistics ==
Japan national team
Year	Apps	Goals
2014	1	0
2015	3	2
2016	1	0
2017	1	0
2018	0	0
2019	0	0
2020	0	0
2021	0	0
2022	2	0
Total	8	2

=== International goals ===
No.	Date	Venue	Opponent	Score	Result	Competition
1.	1 August 2015	Wuhan Sports Center Stadium, Wuhan, China	North Korea	2–2	2–4	2015 EAFF Women's East Asian Cup
2.	8 August 2015	Wuhan Sports Center Stadium, Wuhan, China	China	2–0	2–0	2015 EAFF Women's East Asian Cup
