= Veertien Mie Ladies =

- Full name: Veertien Mie Ladies
- Nickname: V Mie
- Founded: 2012
- Ground: Asahi Gas Energy Toin Stadium
- Chairman: Daisuke Goto
- Head coach: Mori Shuzo
- League: Nadeshiko League Div. 2
- Website: https://www.veertien.jp/lfc/

Veertien Mie Ladies (ヴィアティン三重レディース, Viathin Mie Redhi-su) is a women's association football club which plays in Japan's Nadeshiko League.

== Results ==
Season	Domestic League				National Cup	League Cup
Season	League	Level	Place	Tms.	National Cup	League Cup
2013						
2014						
2015						
2016						
2017						
2018						
2019						
2020						
2021						
2022						
2023	Nadeshiko Div. 2	3	5	10	1st stage	
2024	Nadeshiko Div. 2	3	7	12		

== See also ==
- Japan Football Association
