= Nadeshiko League =

Japanese association football league

- Founded: 1989; 37 years ago, as L.League
- Country: Japan
- Confederation: AFC
- Divisions: D1: Division 1 D2: Division 2
- Number of clubs: D1: 12; D2: 12
- Level on pyramid: 2–3
- Relegation to: Regional leagues
- Domestic cup: Empress's Cup
- League cup: Nadeshiko League Cup
- Current champions: D1: Asahi Intecc Loveledge Nagoya (1st title); D2: VONDS Ichihara FC Ladies (1st title) (2025)
- Most championships: D1: NTV Beleza (17 titles); D2:
- Broadcaster: YouTube
- Website: en.nadeshikoleague.jp (in English)
- Current: 2026 Nadeshiko League

The Japan Women's Football League (Japanese: 日本女子サッカーリーグ; Nihon Joshi Sakkā Rīgu), commonly known as the Nadeshiko League (Japanese: なでしこリーグ; Nadeshiko Rīgu), is a women's association football league in Japan.

The Nadeshiko League consists of two divisions that correspond to the second and third levels of the Japanese women's football pyramid respectively. Teams are promoted and relegated between the divisions, and between the Nadeshiko League Division 2 and the fourth-level Japanese regional leagues, based on performance in the previous season. Prior to 2021, the Nadeshiko League occupied the top level of the Japanese women's football pyramid as well; that level is now represented by the fully professional WE League.

Since 2008, the Nadeshiko League has been sponsored by Plenus (株式会社プレナス), a fast food (bento) company based in Fukuoka.

== History ==
The Japan Women's Football League, or the L. League, was founded in 1989. The founding six clubs were Yomiuri SC Ladies Beleza, Shinko Seiko FC Clair, Nissan FC Ladies, Shimizu FC Ladies, Prima Ham FC Kunoichi, and Tasaki-Shinju Kobe Ladies. From 1993 to 1999 it adopted an Apertura and Clausura system, similar to the J. League system of that era. From 2000 to 2003 the clubs were divided into East and West groups and then the top clubs of each would go into a championship group, with the bottom clubs in a relegation group. In 2004 the single-table format was brought back. Teams from this early era would host annual training camps to build skills and relationships with international women's football clubs, such as those in the United States and Australia.

In 2004 the L. League acquired the nickname the Nadeshiko League. Nadeshiko is the name of the dianthus flower and was chosen from suggestions by fans, signifying an ideal of a dutiful Japanese woman.

In the 2004 season, the L. League added a second division, and until 2009 the league operated in the same way as the old Japan Soccer League for men where the bottom club in the second division playing off against a regional league playoff winner. In 2010, the second division was divided into east and west groups of six teams each; the winners of each group were promoted to the first division.

After Japan's World Cup win in 2011, the L. League saw an upsurge in popularity. In 2015, the league added a third division called the Nadeshiko Challenge League (チャレンジリーグ, Charenji Rīgu) was added, and the first and second divisions now had 10 teams each.

In 2020, the Japan Football Association announced that the newly established WE League will become the top level for women's football in Japan in 2021. The Nadeshiko League would then become the second to fourth levels of the Japanese women's football pyramid. After many top teams left for the WE League, the Nadeshiko League abolished the third division in 2021.

== Structure ==
Since 2021, the Nadeshiko League consists of two divisions:

Level on the pyramid	Division
II	Nadeshiko League Division 1 (Plenus Nadeshiko League Division 1); 12 clubs ↓ 1 relegation spot
III	Nadeshiko League Division 2 (Plenus Nadeshiko League Division 2); 12 clubs ↑ 1 promotion spot ↓ 2 promotion/relegation series spot

== Clubs ==
=== Champions ===
==== Division 1 ====
Bold indicate doubles with the Empress's Cup.

Year	Club
1989	Shimizu FC Ladies
1990	Yomiuri SC Ladies Beleza
1991	Yomiuri SC Ladies Beleza
1992	Yomiuri Nippon SC Ladies Beleza
1993	**Yomiuri Nippon SC Ladies Beleza**
1994	Matsushita Electric LSC Bambina
1995	**Prima Ham FC Kunoichi**
1996	**Nikko Securities Dream Ladies**
1997	Nikko Securities Dream Ladies
1998	Nikko Securities Dream Ladies
1999	Prima Ham FC Kunoichi
2000	**Nippon TV Beleza**
2001	Nippon TV Beleza
2002	Nippon TV Beleza
2003	**Tasaki Perule FC**
2004	Saitama Reinas FC
2005	**Nippon TV Beleza**
2006	Nippon TV Beleza
2007	**Nippon TV Beleza**

Year	Club
2008	**Nippon TV Beleza**
2009	Urawa Reds Ladies
2010	Nippon TV Beleza
2011	**INAC Kobe Leonessa**
2012	**INAC Kobe Leonessa**
2013	**INAC Kobe Leonessa**
2014	Urawa Reds Ladies
2015	Nippon TV Beleza
2016	Nippon TV Beleza
2017	**Nippon TV Beleza**
2018	**Nippon TV Beleza**
2019	Nippon TV Beleza
2020	Urawa Reds Ladies
2021	Iga FC Kunoichi Mie
2022	Sfida Setagaya FC
2023	Orca Kamogawa FC
2024	Viamaterras Miyazaki
2025	Asahi Intecc Loveledge Nagoya

===== Wins by club =====
Clubs in bold are those competing in Division 1 as of the 2023 season. Clubs in italics no longer exist.

Club	Championships	Years
Nippon TV Beleza (Note: Yomiuri Beleza was renamed to Nippon TV Beleza in 1999 and to Tokyo Verdy Beleza in 2011, when the Yomiuri Group sold its stake.)	17	1990, 1991, 1992, 1993, 2000, 2001, 2002, 2005, 2006, 2007, 2008, 2010, 2015, 2016, 2017, 2018, 2019
Urawa Reds Ladies (Note: Saitama Reinas were absorbed by Urawa Red Diamonds in 2005.)	4	2004, 2009, 2014, 2020
Nikko Securities Dream Ladies	3	1996, 1997, 1998
**Iga FC Kunoichi** (Note: Prima Ham FC Kunoichi was renamed to Iga FC Kunoichi in 2000.)	3	1995, 1999, 2021
INAC Kobe Leonessa	3	2011, 2012, 2013
Shimizu FC Ladies	1	1989
**Matsushita Electric LSC Bambina** (Note: Matsushita LSC Bambina was renamed to Speranza FC Takatsuki in 2000. Then, renamed to Speranza Osaka-Takatsuki in 2012.)	1	1994
Tasaki Perule FC	1	2003
**Sfida Setagaya FC**	1	2022
**Orca Kamogawa FC**	1	2023
**Viamaterras Miyazaki**	1	2024
**Asahi Intecc Loveledge Nagoya**	1	2025

===== Wins by region =====
Region	Total	Clubs
Kantō	26	Nippon TV Beleza (17), Nikko Securities Dream Ladies (3), Urawa Reds Ladies (4), Sfida Setagaya FC (1), Orca Kamogawa FC (1)
Kansai	5	INAC Kobe Leonessa (3), Matsushita Electric LSC Bambina (1), Tasaki Perule FC (1)
Tōkai	4	Iga FC Kunoichi (3), Shimizu FC Ladies (1)

==== Division 2 ====
Year	Club	
2004	Okayama Yunogo Belle	
2005	INAC Kobe Leonessa	
2006	Albirex Niigata Ladies	
2007	TEPCO Mareeze	
2008	JEF United Chiba Ladies	
2009	AS Elfen Sayama FC	
Year	East	West
2010	Tokiwagi Gakuen HS	Speranza FC Takatsuki
2011	Tokiwagi Gakuen HS	FC Kibi International University Charme
Year	Club	
2012	Vegalta Sendai Ladies	
2013	Tokiwagi Gakuen HS	
2014	Speranza FC Osaka-Takatsuki	
2015	AC Nagano Parceiro Ladies	
2016	Nojima Stella Kanagawa Sagamihara	
2017	Nippon Sport Science University Fields Yokohama	
2018	Iga FC Kunoichi	
2019	Ehime FC Ladies	
2020	Sfida Setagaya FC	
2021	JFA Academy Fukushima	
2022	Shizuoka SSU Bonita	
2023	Viamaterras Miyazaki	
2024	Okayama Yunogo Belle	
2025	VONDS Ichihara FC Ladies	

==== Challenge League ====
Year	Club
2015	Tokiwagi Gakuen HS
2016	Orca Kamogawa FC
2017	Shizuoka Sangyo University Iwata Bonita
2018	Yamato Sylphid
2019	FC Jumonji Ventus
2020	JFA Academy Fukushima

=== 2024 season ===
==== Division 1 ====
Club	Hometown	Current spell in D1
Bunnys Gunma FC White Star	Maebashi	2022–
Orca Kamogawa FC	Kamogawa	2021–
Sfida Setagaya FC	Setagaya	2021–
Nittaidai SMG Yokohama	Yokohama	2021–
Yokohama FC Seagulls	Yokohama	2021–
Shizuoka SSU Bonita	Iwata	2023–
NGU Loveledge Nagoya	Nagoya	2021–
Iga FC Kunoichi	Iga	2019–
Speranza Osaka	Takatsuki	2021–
AS Harima Albion	Himeji	2021–
Ehime FC Ladies	Matsuyama	2020–
Viamaterras Miyazaki	Shintomi	2024–

==== Division 2 ====
Clubs	Hometown
JFA Academy Fukushima LSC	Susono
Tsukuba FC Ladies	Tsukuba
Yamato Sylphid	Yamato
SEISA OSA Rhea Shonan FC	Ōiso
FC Fujizakura Yamanashi	Narusawa
Veertien Mie Ladies	Kuwana
Diosa Izumo FC	Izumo
Okayama Yunogo Belle	Mimasaka
KIU Charme	Takahashi
Diavorosso Hiroshima	Kumano
FC Imabari Ladies	Imabari
Fukuoka J. Anclas	Fukuoka

=== Previous clubs ===
The following clubs have previously competed in the Nadeshiko League for at least one season.

==== Joined WE League in 2021 ====
- Mynavi Sendai
- Urawa Reds
- Omiya Ardija Ventus (formerly FC Jumonji Ventus)
- Elfen Saitama
- JEF United Chiba
- NTV Tokyo Verdy Beleza
- Nojima Stella Kanagawa Sagamihara
- AC Nagano Parceiro
- Albirex Niigata
- INAC Kobe Leonessa

==== Joined WE League in 2023 ====
- Cerezo Osaka Yanmar Ladies

==== Relegated to regional leagues ====
- Je Vrille Kagoshima: relegated to Kyushu League from 2014
- Shimizudaihachi Pleiades: relegated to Tokai League from 2015
- Mashiki Renaissance Kumamoto F.C.: relegated to Kyushu League from 2016

==== Defunct ====
- Fujita Soccer Club Mercury (affiliated with Shonan Bellmare)
- Nikko Securities Dream Ladies
- Nissan F.C. Ladies (affiliated with Yokohama Marinos)
- OKI F.C. Winds
- Shiroki F.C. Serena
- Suzuyo Shimizu F.C. Lovely Ladies (affiliated with Shimizu S-Pulse)
- Tasaki Perule F.C.
- Tokyo Shidax L.S.C. (formerly Shinko Seiko F.C. Clair)
- Urawa Ladies F.C.
- TEPCO Mareeze (dissolved after Fukushima Daiichi nuclear disaster; many of the players moved to Vegalta Sendai Ladies)
- Aguilas Kobe
- Hoyo Sukarabu F.C.

== Division 1 awards ==
=== Most Valuable Player ===
Year	Player	Club
2002	Tomoe Sakai	NTV Beleza
2003	Mio Otani	Tasaki Perule F.C.
2004	Kozue Ando	Saitama Reinas F.C.
2005	Shinobu Ohno	NTV Beleza
2006	Homare Sawa	NTV Beleza
2007	Shinobu Ohno	NTV Beleza
2008	Homare Sawa	NTV Beleza
2009	Kozue Ando	Urawa Reds Ladies
2010	Shinobu Ohno	NTV Beleza
2011	Nahomi Kawasumi	INAC Kobe Leonessa
2012	Megumi Takase	INAC Kobe Leonessa
2013	Nahomi Kawasumi	INAC Kobe Leonessa
2014	Michi Goto	Urawa Reds Ladies
2015	Mizuho Sakaguchi	NTV Beleza
2016	Mizuho Sakaguchi	NTV Beleza
2017	Mizuho Sakaguchi	NTV Beleza
2018	Mina Tanaka	NTV Beleza
2019	Mina Tanaka	NTV Beleza
2020	Yuika Sugasawa	Urawa Reds Ladies
2021	Ami Sugita	Iga FC Kunoichi Mie
2022	Mayu Otake	Sfida Setagaya FC
2023	Haruhi Suzuki	Orca Kamogawa FC

=== Top Goalscorers ===
Year	Player	Goals	Club
2002	Mio Otani	5	Tasaki Perule F.C.
2003	Mio Otani	33	Tasaki Perule F.C.
2004	Kozue Ando	12	Saitama Reinas F.C.
2005	Mio Otani	25	Tasaki Perule F.C.
2006	Yūki Nagasato	18	NTV Beleza
2007	Shinobu Ohno	23	NTV Beleza
2008	Shinobu Ohno	20	NTV Beleza
2009	Kozue Ando	18	Urawa Reds Ladies
2010	Shinobu Ohno	13	NTV Beleza
2011	Nahomi Kawasumi	12	INAC Kobe Leonessa
2011	Shinobu Ohno	12	INAC Kobe Leonessa
2012	Megumi Takase	20	INAC Kobe Leonessa
2013	Beverly Goebel	15	INAC Kobe Leonessa
2014	Yuika Sugasawa	20	JEF United Chiba Ladies
2015	Yuika Sugasawa	15	JEF United Chiba Ladies
2016	Mina Tanaka	18	NTV Beleza
2017	Mina Tanaka	15	NTV Beleza
2018	Mina Tanaka	15	NTV Beleza
2019	Mina Tanaka	20	NTV Beleza
2020	Yuika Sugasawa	17	Urawa Reds Ladies
2021	Asuka Nishikawa	19	Iga FC Kunoichi Mie
2022	Sonoko Chiba	14	AS Harima Albion
2023	Chiina Kamiya	14	Asahi Intecc Loveledge Nagoya

=== Best Young Player ===
Year	Player	Club
2002	Kozue Ando	Saitama Reinas F.C.
2003	Yukari Kinga	NTV Beleza
2004	Natsuki Muraoka	Iga FC Kunoichi
2005	Karina Maruyama	TEPCO Mareeze
2006	Noriko Matsuda	Urawa Reds Ladies
2007	Kyoko Yano	Urawa Reds Ladies
2008	Mana Iwabuchi	NTV Beleza
2009	Megumi Takase	INAC Kobe Leonessa
2010	Nozomi Fujita	Urawa Reds Ladies
2011	Chinatsu Kira	Urawa Reds Ladies
2012	Shiho Kohata	Urawa Reds Ladies
2013	Saki Ueno	JEF Chiba Ladies
2014	Ruka Norimatsu	Urawa Reds Ladies
2015	Kiko Seike	Urawa Reds Ladies
2016	Hina Sugita	INAC Kobe Leonessa
2017	Yui Fukuta	INAC Kobe Leonessa
2018	Hinata Miyazawa	NTV Beleza
2019	Satsuki Miura	INAC Kobe Leonessa
2020	Fukina Mizuno	INAC Kobe Leonessa
2021	Nina Yamada	Ehime FC Ladies
2022	Yuka Kuratomi	Sfida Setagaya FC
2023	Natsumi Tago	Ehime FC Ladies

== See also ==
- Football in Japan
- Women's football in Japan
- Japan Football Association (JFA)
- Japanese association football league system
- WE League (I)
- Japanese Regional Leagues (women) (IV)
- Empress's Cup (National Cup)
- Nadeshiko League Cup (League Cup)
