= FC Fujizakura Yamanashi =

Japanese women's football club

FC Fujizakura Yamanashi FCふじざくら山梨
- Full name: FC Fujizakura Yamanashi
- Founded: 2019; 7 years ago
- Manager: Taguchi Tomohisa
- League: Nadeshiko League Division 2
- 2025: Nadeshiko League Division 2, 4th of 10
- Website: https://www.fujizakura-sc.jp/

FC Fujizakura Yamanashi (Japanese: FCふじざくら山梨, Hepburn: FC Fujizakura Yamanashi) is a women's football team founded in 2019. The team is sponsored by Fuji kanko Kaihatsu, providing opportunities for player to work at the Fuji Yurari Hot Spring . After joining the Nadeshiko League Division 2 in 2023, the club's vision is to gain promotion to play in Division 1. The long-term goal is to play at the WE League, the professional football league for women's football in Japan, in the 2028 season.

The club currently plays in the Nadeshiko League Division 2, the 3rd tier of the Japanese League System. They finished the 2024 season as the second runner-up in the league, a record high for the club.

The club represents the Yamanashi Prefecture, all three of their home stadiums are located within the prefecture. They are Mt. Fuji's famous water stadium, JIT Recycle Ink Stadium, and Nirasaki Central Park Athletics Stadium. Starting from the 2025 season, fans are required to purchase tickets to watch the home games.

== Current squad ==
As of 30 March 2025.

Note: Flags indicate national team as defined under FIFA eligibility rules; some limited exceptions apply. Players may hold more than one non-FIFA nationality.

| No. | Pos. | Nation | Player |
|---|---|---|---|
| 1 | GK | JPN | Deguchi Haruna |
| 3 | DF | JPN | Kamura Nanami |
| 4 | MF | JPN | Kokaji Asahi |
| 5 | DF | JPN | Takayama Saki |
| 6 | MF | JPN | Hamana Kako |
| 7 | MF | JPN | Ihara Minami |
| 8 | MF | JPN | Genseki Kiyoka |
| 9 | FW | JPN | Yamamoto Naomi |
| 10 | MF | JPN | Suga Momoka |
| 11 | MF | JPN | Nakamura Yuka |
| 12 | GK | JPN | Shimada Yukiho |
| 13 | MF | JPN | Sasaki Aoi |
| 14 | FW | JPN | Wakita Saya |

| No. | Pos. | Nation | Player |
|---|---|---|---|
| 15 | FW | JPN | Narisako Misaki |
| 16 | FW | JPN | Tsujino Yumiko |
| 17 | MF | JPN | Ohtani Ruan |
| 20 | DF | JPN | Gomi Kokaru |
| 21 | FW | JPN | Uchida Shuka |
| 23 | MF | JPN | Omori Misaki |
| 27 | DF | JPN | Kato Mana |
| 28 | MF | JPN | Shimamura Mifu |
| 29 | MF | JPN | Sanda Yukimi |
| 30 | MF | JPN | Hosaka Nodoka |
| 33 | GK | JPN | Yonezawa Mokea |
| 40 | DF | JPN | Suzuki Ayaka |

== Results ==
| Season | Domestic League | | | | National Cup | Nadeshiko League Promotion Series |
| Season | League | Level | Place | Tms. | National Cup | Nadeshiko League Promotion Series |
|---|---|---|---|---|---|---|
| 2019 | Yamanashi Prefecture Women's Football League Division 2 | 7 | 4 | 9 | Prefecture Qualifier Final | Playoff |
| 2020 | Yamanashi Prefecture Women's Football League Division 1 | 6 | 2 | 6 | Prefecture Qualifier Final | |
| 2021 | Yamanashi Prefecture Women's Football League Division 1 | 6 | 1 | 6 | First Round | Group Stage |
| 2022 | Kanto Women's Football League Division 2 | 5 | 1 | 8 | Second Round | 2nd in playoff (Promoted) |
| 2023 | Nadeshiko League Division 2 | 3 | 7 | 10 | Regional Second Round | |
| 2024 | Nadeshiko League Division 2 | 3 | 2 | 12 | Regional Second Round | |
