= Diosa Izumo FC =

- Full name: Diosa Izumo F.C.
- Nickname(s): Diosa
- Founded: 1991
- Manager: Jun Tanaka
- League: Chugoku League / Div.4
- 2016: 1st
- Website: http://www.diosa-fc.jp/

Diosa Izumo F.C. (ディオッサ出雲F.C.) is a women's football club playing in Japan's football league, Chugoku League. Its hometown is the city of Izumo.

== Current squad ==
As of 7 June 2015

Note: Flags indicate national team as defined under FIFA eligibility rules; some limited exceptions apply. Players may hold more than one non-FIFA nationality.

No.	Pos.	Nation	Player
1		(Japan) JPN	Makoto Nakashima
2		(Japan) JPN	Nastumi Tanaka
3		(Japan) JPN	Chiemi Katayose
4		(Japan) JPN	Aiko Fujino
5		(Japan) JPN	Chiaki Yagyu
6		(Japan) JPN	Keina Kinjyo
7		(Japan) JPN	Mari Yoshioka

No.	Pos.	Nation	Player
8		(Japan) JPN	Yuka Oosawa
9		(Japan) JPN	Shuri Itou
10		(Japan) JPN	Miyu Yoshizawa
13		(Japan) JPN	Keika Fujihara
15		(Japan) JPN	Yuzuka Ishikawa
16		(Japan) JPN	Hiroko Yamada
17		(Japan) JPN	Nastuka Nishimura

== Results ==
Season	Domestic League				National Cup	League Cup	League Note
Season	League	Level	Place	Tms.	National Cup	League Cup	League Note
2013	Shimane	4		4	DNQ	-	
2014	Shimane	4	1st	5	DNQ	-	
2015	Chugoku	4	3rd	12	1st Stage	-	
2016	Chugoku	4	1st	12	DNQ	-	
2017	Chugoku	4		12	DNQ	-	

== Ground ==
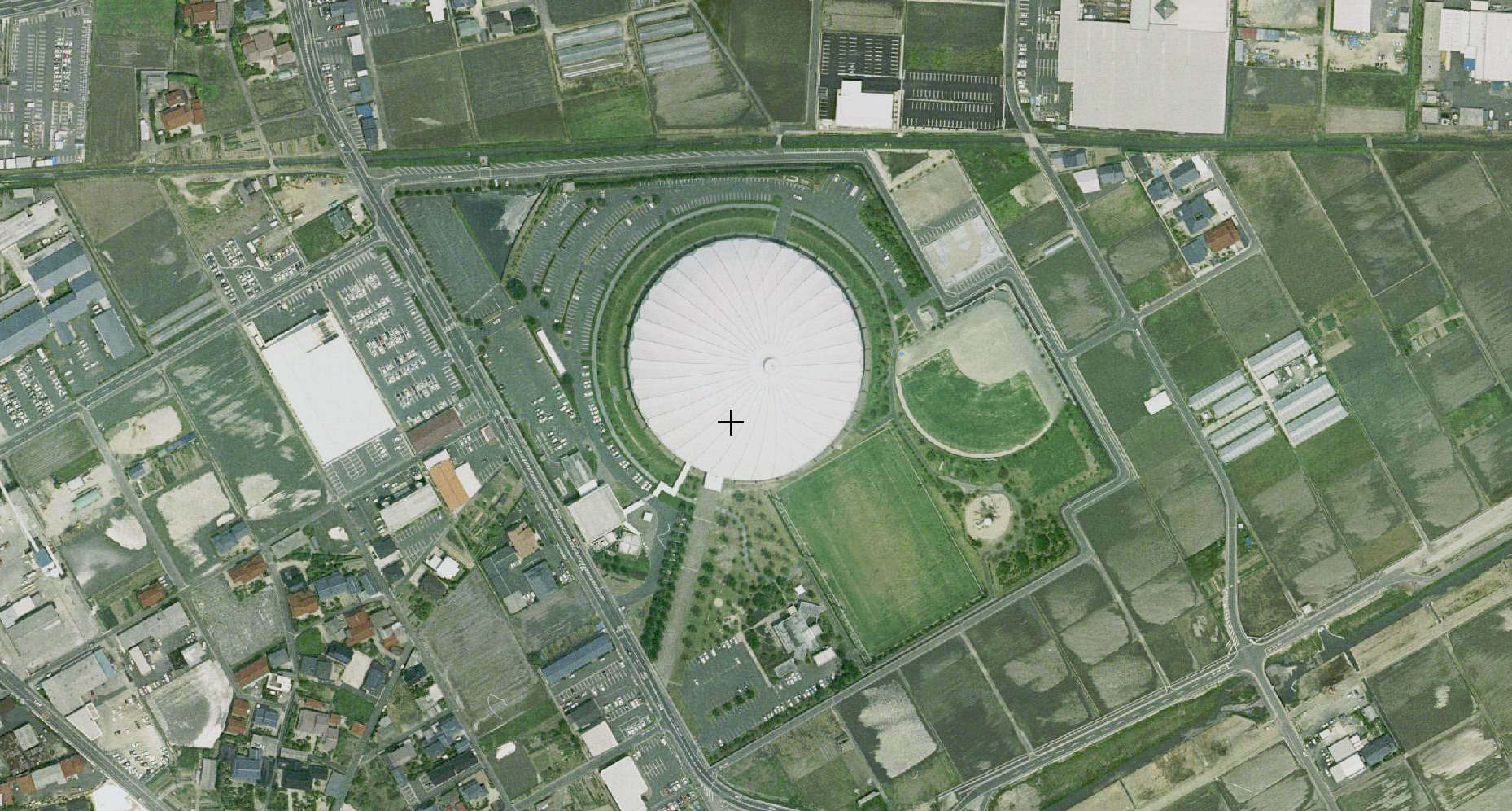
Izumo Health Park
