= Asahi Intecc Loveledge Nagoya =

Asahi Intecc Loveledge Nagoya 朝日インテック・ラブリッジ名古屋
- Full name: Asahi Intecc Loveledge Nagoya (1 February 2022 – 31 January 2025)
- Nickname: Loveledge Nagoya
- Founded: 1998
- League: Nadeshiko League Div.1
- 2024: Nadeshiko League Div.1, 3rd of 12
- Website: http://loveledge.jp/

Asahi Intecc Loveledge Nagoya (朝日インテック・ラブリッジ名古屋) is a women's football club playing in Japan's football league, the Nadeshiko League Division 1. Its hometown is the city of Nagoya, Aichi.

== Squad ==
=== Current squad ===
As of 2 May 2022. Note: Flags indicate national team as defined under FIFA eligibility rules; some limited exceptions apply. Players may hold more than one non-FIFA nationality.

No.	Pos.	Nation	Player
1	GK	JPN	Miharu Takahashi
2	DF	JPN	Makiko Morita
3	DF	JPN	Mayu Terada
4	DF	JPN	Kaho Ohshima
5	MF	JPN	Saki Fujimura
7	MF	JPN	Ayano Koike
8	MF	JPN	Chisa Kuwata
9	MF	JPN	Mayura Imai
10	FW	JPN	Ayuka Kato
11	FW	JPN	Miyabi Aoshima
13	DF	JPN	Rika Usui

No.	Pos.	Nation	Player
14	MF	JPN	Yuka Sugiyama
15	MF	JPN	Ibuki Kato
16	FW	JPN	Yui Ogawa
18	FW	JPN	Ao Sato
19	DF	JPN	Yuka Shimada
20	MF	JPN	Rina Takenaka
21	FW	JPN	Nayo Kawai
22	GK	JPN	Mao Unoki
23	GK	JPN	Hiyori Demizu

== Results ==
Season	Domestic League				National Cup	League Cup
Season	League	Level	Place	Tms.	National Cup	League Cup
1998	Aichi Div.2	5	2nd		DNQ	-
1999	Aichi Div.2	5	3rd		DNQ	-
2000	Aichi Div.2	5	1st		DNQ	-
2001	Aichi Div.1	4	3rd		DNQ	-
2002	Aichi Div.1	4	4th		DNQ	-
2003	Aichi Div.1	4	1st		DNQ	-
2004	Tokai	3	2nd	10	1st Stage	-
2005	Tokai	3	1st	10	2nd Stage	-
2006	Tokai	3	1st	10	1st Stage	-
2007	Tokai	3	1st	10	DNQ	-
2008	Tokai	3	2nd	10	1st Stage	-
2009	Tokai	3	3rd	10	DNQ	-
2010	Tokai	3	3rd	10	DNQ	-
2011	Tokai	3	2nd	10	DNQ	-
2012	Tokai	3	3rd	12	DNQ	-
2013	Tokai Div.1	3	3rd	6	DNQ	-
2014	Tokai Div.1	3	3rd	6	DNQ	-
2015	Challenge(West)	3	5th	6	2nd Stage	-
2016	Challenge	3	10th	12	1st Stage	-
2017	Challenge	3	7th	12	2nd Stage	-
2018						
2019						
2020						
2021						
2022						
2023						

== Transition of team name ==
- Nagoya FC Ladies : 1998 -2011
- NGU Nagoya FC Ladies : 2012 – 2016
- NGU Loveledge Nagoya : 2017 – 2021
- Asahi Intecc Loveledge Nagoya : 2022 – Present
