= NHK Spring Yokohama FC Seagulls =

NHK Spring Yokohama FC Seagulls ニッパツ横浜FCシーガルズ
- Full name: NHK Spring Yokohama FC Seagulls
- Nickname: Seagulls
- Founded: 1976
- Manager: Yuichi Yoda
- League: Nadeshiko League Div.1
- 2024: Nadeshiko League Div.1, 2nd of 12
- Website: http://www.yokohamafc.com/yokohamafc-seagulls/

NHK Spring Yokohama FC Seagulls (ニッパツ横浜FCシーガルズ) is a women's football club playing in Japan's football league, Kanto League. Its hometown is the city of Yokohama.

== Squad ==
=== Current squad ===
As of 2 May 2022. Note: Flags indicate national team as defined under FIFA eligibility rules; some limited exceptions apply. Players may hold more than one non-FIFA nationality.

No.	Pos.	Nation	Player
1	GK	JPN	Haruna Deguchi
2	DF	JPN	Sayuri Imai
3	DF	JPN	Mami Kanazawa
4	DF	JPN	Kana Yamamoto
6	DF	JPN	Marina Senda
8	MF	JPN	Nanami Miyashita
9	FW	JPN	Yui Tanaka
10	MF	JPN	Manami Shibata

No.	Pos.	Nation	Player
11	FW	JPN	Mizuki Yoshida
13	FW	JPN	Misato Ishihara
14	MF	JPN	Kaori Muta
15	MF	JPN	Anna Sano
16	DF	JPN	Maki Yamana
17	FW	JPN	Mayu Fujikake
18	MF	JPN	Miku Nakai
19	MF	JPN	Nagisa Sato
20	FW	JPN	Ami Ishihara
21	GK	JPN	Maya Asari

== Coaching staff ==
Role	Nat.	Name
Manager	(Japan)	Yuichi Yoda
Assistant manager	(Japan)	Mihoko Ishida
Goalkeeper coach	(Japan)	Kazuma Takahashi
Physical coach	(Japan)	Tetsuya Nakajima
Trainer	(Japan)	Tae Ishikawa

== Former players ==
- (Japan) Keiko Tanaka

== Results ==
Season	Domestic League				Empress's Cup	WE League Cup
Season	League	Level	Place	Tms.	Empress's Cup	WE League Cup
2010	Kanagawa; Div.1	5	3rd	9	DNQ	–
2011	Kanagawa; Div.1	5	2nd	10	DNQ	–
2012	Kanagawa; Div.1	5	3rd	10	DNQ	–
2013	Kanagawa; Div.1	5	1st	10	DNQ	–
2014	Kanto Div.2	4	1st	8	DNQ	–
2015	Challenge (East)	3	1st	6	Second round	–
2016	Nadeshiko League Div.2	2	8th	10	Third round	Group stage/Div.2
2017	Nadeshiko League Div.2	2	5th	10	First round	Group stage/Div.2
2018						
2019						
2020						
2021						
2022						
2023						

== Transition of team name ==
- Yokosuka Seagulls FC: 2006–2012
- Yokohama FC Seagulls: 2013–2015
- NHK Spring Yokohama FC Seagulls: 2016–present
