= Sfida Setagaya FC =

Sfida Setagaya F.C. スフィーダ世田谷F.C.
- Full name: Sfida Setagaya F.C.
- Nickname: S-Setagaya
- Founded: 2001; 24 years ago
- Ground: Komazawa Olympic Park
- Manager: Akihiko Kamikawa
- League: Nadeshiko League Div.1
- 2024: Nadeshiko League Div.1, 4th of 12
- Website: http://www.sfida.or.jp/
Home colours	Away colours

Sfida Setagaya F.C. (スフィーダ世田谷F.C., Sufīda Setagaya Efu Shī) is a women's football club based in Setagaya, Tokyo. The club currently play in Nadeshiko League, Japan's second tier of women football league.

== Squad ==
=== Current squad ===
As of 21 October 2022

Note: Flags indicate national team as defined under FIFA eligibility rules; some limited exceptions apply. Players may hold more than one non-FIFA nationality.

No.	Pos.	Nation	Player
1	GK	JPN	Himeka Ishino
2	DF	JPN	Ayaka Nemoto
3	MF	JPN	Miu Kashiwabara
4	DF	JPN	Ayumi Toda
5	DF	JPN	Mizuki Watanabe
6	MF	JPN	Yui Kaneko
7	FW	JPN	Satsuki Nakayama
8	DF	JPN	Shioka Kumagai
9	FW	JPN	Mitsuki Horie
10	MF	JPN	Mayu Otake
11	MF	JPN	Akane Nagasaki
13	DF	JPN	Yuka Kuratomi
14	FW	JPN	Mahiru Takishita

No.	Pos.	Nation	Player
15	MF	JPN	Sayaka Mitsumoto
16	MF	JPN	Maasa Taguchi
17	DF	JPN	Kanako Takeshima
18	MF	JPN	Nanami Shishido
19	FW	JPN	Yumino Yasuda
20	MF	JPN	Serina Kashimoto
21	GK	JPN	Hoshimi Kishi
22	FW	JPN	Mao Murakami
23	FW	JPN	Ayaka Ito
24	MF	JPN	Hikari Shirasaki
25	GK	JPN	Tomomi Nomura
26	FW	JPN	Yuka Kawabe
27	GK	JPN	Mahiro Ishikawa

== Club officials ==
Position	Name
Manager	(Japan) Akihiko Kamikawa
Assistant manager	(Japan) Tamai Kawashima
Trainer	(Japan) Nae Ochiumi

== Results ==
Season	Domestic League				National Cup	League Cup
Season	League	Level	Place	Tms.	National Cup	League Cup
2003	Tokyo Div.2	4	1st	10	DNQ	-
2004	Tokyo Div.1	4	4th	10	DNQ	-
2005	Tokyo Div.1	4	6th	10	DNQ	-
2006	Tokyo Div.1	4	4th	10	DNQ	-
2007	Tokyo Div.1	4	3rd	10	DNQ	-
2008	Tokyo Div.1	4	2nd	9	DNQ	-
2009	Tokyo Div.1	4	1st	10	DNQ	-
2010	Tokyo Div.1	4	1st	10	DNQ	-
2011	Challenge(East)	2	3rd	6	DNQ	-
2012	Challenge	2	3rd	12	DNQ	-
2013	Challenge	2	3rd	16	3rd Stage	-
2014	Challenge	2	6th	16	2nd Stage	-
2015	Nadeshiko; Div.2	2	4th	10	2nd Stage	-
2016	Nadeshiko; Div.2	2	5th	10	3rd Stage	Group Stage / Div.2
2017	Nadeshiko; Div.2	2	6th	10	2nd Stage	Group Stage / Div.2
2018	Nadeshiko; Div.2	2	8th	10	2nd Stage	2nd
2019	Nadeshiko; Div.2	2	7th	10	2nd Stage	Group Stage / Div.2
2020	Nadeshiko; Div.2	2	1st	10	3rd Stage	Canceled
2021	Nadeshiko; Div.1	2	2nd	12	4th Stage	-
2022	Nadeshiko; Div.1	2	1st	12	4th Stage	-
2023	Nadeshiko; Div.1	2	4th	12	TBD	-
