= Viamaterras Miyazaki =

Japanese women's football club

- Full name: Viamaterras Miyazaki
- Nickname: Viama
- Founded: 2020
- Owner: Connecting Sports Miyazaki
- Chairman: Noriko Akimoto
- Head coach: Shoma Mizunaga
- League: Nadeshiko League Div.1
- 2024: Nadeshiko League Div. 1, 1st of 12
- Website: https://www.miyazakisports.jp/

Viamaterras Miyazaki (ヴィアマテラス宮崎, Viamaterasu Miyazaki) is a women's association football club which plays in Japan's Nadeshiko League.

== Players ==
=== Current squad ===
As of 27 November 2022

Note: Flags indicate national team as defined under FIFA eligibility rules; some limited exceptions apply. Players may hold more than one non-FIFA nationality.

No.	Pos.	Nation	Player
2	DF	JPN	Iori Hashitani
3	DF	JPN	Yoshina Emori
4	FW	JPN	Momoko Nagano (captain)
5	DF	JPN	Narumi Kuratani
6	DF	JPN	Yuna Nomura
7	MF	JPN	Riko Arima
8	MF	JPN	Asuka Kakazu
10	FW	JPN	Yuri Nagatomi
11	FW	JPN	Sawa Matsuda
14	MF	JPN	Ayako Shimada
15	GK	JPN	Hinano Baba

No.	Pos.	Nation	Player
16	MF	JPN	Tomoko Fukumaru
17	FW	JPN	Yuma Saito
19	MF	JPN	Mao Kiritoshi
20	FW	JPN	Koyuki Ito
21	DF	JPN	Riho Sakamoto
22	MF	JPN	Suzu Murakami
23	MF	JPN	Mao Sajiki
24	MF	JPN	Minori Sato
28	DF	JPN	Mitsuki Sato
32	FW	JPN	Rina Matsuno
37	DF	JPN	Tomomi Tsunemasu

== Season by season record ==
Season	Domestic League				Empress's Cup
Season	League	Level	Position	Tms.	Empress's Cup
2021	Kyushu Soccer League Div.2	5	1st	9	First round
2022	Kyushu Soccer League Div.1	4	1st	9	Second round
2023	Nadeshiko League Div.2	3	1st	10	Fourth round
2024	Nadeshiko League Div.1	2	1st	12	Quarter-finals

== See also ==
- Japan Football Association (JFA)
