= Diavorosso Hiroshima =

- Full name: Diavorosso Hiroshima
- Nickname: DR Hiroshima
- Founded: 2019
- Head coach: Kenichi Sadakiyo
- League: Nadeshiko League Div.2
- 2022: Nadeshiko League Div.2, 4th of 10
- Website: Official website

Diavorosso Hiroshima (ディアヴォロッソ広島, Dhiavorosso Hiroshima) is a women's association football club which plays in Japan's Nadeshiko League.

== Players ==
=== Current squad ===
As of 4 October 2022

Note: Flags indicate national team as defined under FIFA eligibility rules; some limited exceptions apply. Players may hold more than one non-FIFA nationality.

No.	Pos.	Nation	Player
1	GK	JPN	Aki Shimizu
17	GK	JPN	Miki Sakima

No.	Pos.	Nation	Player

== Results ==
Season	Domestic League				National Cup	League Cup
Season	League	Level	Place	Tms.	National Cup	League Cup
2019						
2020						
2021						
2022						
2023						

== See also ==
- Japan Football Association
