= Shizuoka SSU Bonita =

- Full name: Shizuoka SSU Bonita
- Founded: 2008
- Ground: Yumeria
- Chairman: Tetsuji Miura
- Manager: Takashi Ogawa
- League: Nadeshiko League Div. 1
- 2024: Nadeshiko League Div. 1, 7th of 12
- Website: https://shizuoka-ssu.com/
Home colours

Shizuoka SSU Bonita (静岡SSUボニータ) is a women's football club playing in Japan's football league, the Nadeshiko League Division 1. Its hometown is the city of Iwata, Shizuoka.

== Squad ==
=== Current squad ===
As of 22 December 2022. Note: Flags indicate national team as defined under FIFA eligibility rules; some limited exceptions apply. Players may hold more than one non-FIFA nationality.

No.	Pos.	Nation	Player
1	GK	JPN	Miharu Takahashi
2	MF	JPN	Ayaka Watanabe
3	DF	JPN	Momoka Hikosaka
4	DF	JPN	Yu Shiozawa
5	DF	JPN	Mina Hara
6	DF	JPN	Yui Yamada
7	DF	JPN	Rena Koizumi
8	MF	JPN	Mari Koike
9	FW	JPN	Yutsuki Tsuchiya
13	MF	JPN	Shoko Kanamaru
14	FW	JPN	Rena Miwa
15	MF	JPN	Ayane Takashima
16	DF	JPN	Chikako Kojima
17	FW	JPN	Waka Morita
18	FW	JPN	Koko Nakagawa
19	DF	JPN	Rikana Iwamoto
20	GK	JPN	Asuka Tsuji

No.	Pos.	Nation	Player
21	FW	JPN	Chisato Hara
22	DF	JPN	Ayu Nagase
23	GK	JPN	Yukiho Shimada
24	MF	JPN	Kaho Onoda
25	DF	JPN	Kei Yoneda
26	MF	JPN	Shuka Hikida
27	MF	JPN	Minori Kato
28	MF	JPN	Ayumi Kamiyanagi
33	GK	JPN	Remon Ochi
—	GK	JPN	Erika Asai
—	DF	JPN	Minami Nakabayashi
—	MF	JPN	Natsuki Kamimura
—	MF	JPN	Marin Manabe
—	MF	JPN	Ayano Sasaki
—	FW	JPN	Manaka Hasegawa
—	FW	JPN	Hana Koshidaka
—	FW	JPN	Kana Onishi

== Results ==
Season	Domestic League				National Cup	League Cup
Season	League	Level	Place	Tms.	National Cup	League Cup
2008	Shizuoka	4	2nd	11	1st Stage	-
2009	Tokai	3	2nd	8	DNQ	-
2010	Challenge (West)	2	3rd	6	3rd Stage	-
2011	Challenge (West)	2	4th	6	1st Stage	-
2012	Challenge	2	8th	12	1st Stage	-
2013	Challenge	2	6th	16	2nd Stage	-
2014	Challenge	2	13th	16	1st Stage	-
2015	Challenge(West)	3	2nd	6	2nd Stage	-
2016	Challenge	3	3rd	12	2nd Stage	-
2017	Challenge	3	1st	12	1st Stage	-
2018						
2019						
2020						
2021						
2022						
2023						

== Coaching staff ==
Position	Name
Manager	(Japan) Takashi Ogawa
Assistant Manager	(Japan) Takayuki Yasunami
First-Team Coach	(Japan) Kenjiro Yasuda
Trainer	(Japan) Hijiri Wakita (Japan) Ayumi Masuda

== Transition of team name ==
- Shizuoka Sangyo University Iwata Ladies : 2008 - 2009
- Shizuoka Sangyo University Iwata Bonita : 2010 – Present
