= AS Harima Albion =

AS Harima ALBION AS ハリマ アルビオン
- Full name: Athletic Sports Harima ALBION
- Nickname: ALBION
- Founded: 2012
- Ground: Himeji City Stadium
- Capacity: 3,000
- Manager: Suzuka Ono
- League: Nadeshiko League Div.1
- 2024: Nadeshiko League Div.1, 11th of 12
- Website: http://h-albion.jp/

AS Harima ALBION (AS ハリマ アルビオン) is a women's football club playing in Japan's Nadeshiko League Division 1. Its hometown is the city of Himeji.

== Squad ==
=== Current squad ===
As of 21 October 2022

Note: Flags indicate national team as defined under FIFA eligibility rules; some limited exceptions apply. Players may hold more than one non-FIFA nationality.

No.	Pos.	Nation	Player
1	GK	JPN	Ema Takaki
2	DF	JPN	Mei Sugita
3	DF	JPN	Natsuki Higashi
4	DF	JPN	Mio Sakanaka
5	MF	JPN	Kokoro Koike
6	DF	JPN	Shiho Yoshida
7	FW	JPN	Akane Inowaki
8	DF	JPN	Yuki Takeda
9	FW	JPN	Kanami Shinbori
10	MF	JPN	Sonoko Chiba
11	FW	JPN	Yuki Hazuki
13	MF	JPN	Mio Hisanaga
14	MF	JPN	Kanako Shono
15	MF	JPN	Hikaru Nemoto
16	DF	JPN	Kiko Matsukubo
17	MF	JPN	Fumina Katsurama

No.	Pos.	Nation	Player
18	MF	JPN	Rino Nakano
19	DF	JPN	Misato Aoyama
20	DF	JPN	Chinatsu Shidara
21	GK	JPN	Shizuka Kodera
22	MF	JPN	Natsumi Noda
23	MF	JPN	Nanako Miura
24	MF	JPN	Kaede Murata
25	MF	JPN	Fuko Takashi
26	MF	JPN	Ayu Fujiwara
27	MF	JPN	Sara Kawakami
28	MF	JPN	Rimi Yajima
29	FW	JPN	Momoka Tsuchiyama
30	MF	JPN	Ruan Otani
31	GK	JPN	Miho Harada
32	MF	JPN	Honoka Nishizaki
41	GK	JPN	Mio Tanaka

== Results ==
Season	Domestic League				National Cup	League Cup
Season	League	Level	Place	Tms.	National Cup	League Cup
2013	Kansai Div.3	5	1st	10	-	-
2014	Challenge	2	5th	16	3rd Stage	-
2015	Nadeshiko; Div.2	2	7th	10	2nd Stage	-
2016	Nadeshiko; Div.2	2	7th	10	2nd Stage	Winner / Div.2
2017	Nadeshiko; Div.2	2	7th	10	2nd Stage	Group Stage / Div.2
2018						
2019						
2020						
2021						
2022						
2023						
