= Iga FC Kunoichi Mie =

Iga FC Kunoichi Mie 伊賀FCくノ一三重
- Full name: Iga FC Kunoichi Mie
- Nickname: Kunoichi (The Ninjas)
- Founded: 1976
- Ground: Ueno Undo Koen
- Capacity: 4,500
- Chairman: Shigeo Yoshimori
- Manager: Katsuhiro Kusaki
- League: Nadeshiko League Div.1
- 2024: Nadeshiko League Div.1, 5th of 12
- Website: https://www.igafc.jp/
Home colours	Away colours

Iga FC Kunoichi Mie (伊賀FCくノ一三重, Iga FC Kunoichi Mie), is a women's football team which plays in Division 1 of Japan's Nadeshiko League. Iga FC Kunoichi Mie is a women's club in the Tōkai region, making them a competitor among the other clubs of the Kanto, NTV Beleza, and Kansai, INAC Kobe Leonessa.

== Squad ==
=== Current squad ===
As of 9 February 2025

Note: Flags indicate national team as defined under FIFA eligibility rules; some limited exceptions apply. Players may hold more than one non-FIFA nationality.

No.	Pos.	Nation	Player
1	GK	JPN	Kanasa Takeshita
2	DF	JPN	Nana Tsuneda
3	DF	JPN	Miyu Hata
4	MF	JPN	Rie Nishibayashi
5	MF	JPN	Mio Shimano
6	MF	JPN	Mayu Tsuneda
7	MF	JPN	Hitomi Mori
8	MF	JPN	Asuka Mitsuhashi
9	FW	JPN	Kurea Okino
10	MF	JPN	Kotori Sakuma
11	FW	JPN	Shiho Ogawa
13	DF	JPN	Tamami Miyasako
14	FW	JPN	Matsuri Katayama
15	MF	JPN	Rin Watanabe
16	GK	JPN	Suzuka Fujita

No.	Pos.	Nation	Player
17	MF	JPN	Momoka Fujita
19	MF	JPN	Aimi Yamasaki
20	MF	JPN	Saya Kawasaki
21	GK	JPN	Yukari Yokoji
22	MF	JPN	Aoi Sasaki
23	DF	JPN	Maya Sakamoto
24	MF	JPN	Niia Nakagaki
25	DF	JPN	Ami Tamashiro
26	MF	JPN	Yuina Harada
27	DF	JPN	Nanase Murakami
28	DF	JPN	Airi Yonekawa
29	MF	JPN	Aya Shimojo
30	MF	JPN	Sayaka Yamashita

== Honors ==
=== Domestic competitions ===
- Nadeshiko.League Division 1
  - Champions (2) : 1995, 1999, 2021
  - Runners-up (2) : 1996, 2000, 2022
- Empress's Cup All-Japan Women's Football Tournament
  - Champions (3) : 1995, 1998, 2001
  - Runners-up (4) : 1993, 1994, 1997, 1999
- Nadeshiko League Cup
  - Champions (2) : 1997, 1998
  - Runners-up (2) : 1996, 1999

== Results ==
Season	Domestic League				National Cup	League Cup
Season	League	Level	Place	Tms.	National Cup	League Cup
1986	-	-	-	-	1st Stage	-
1987	-	-	-	-	Quarter-finals	-
1988	-	-	-	-	Qualifiers	-
1989	JLSL	1	6th	6	Quarter-finals	-
1990	JLSL	1	3rd	6	Semi-finals	-
1991	JLSL	1	3rd	10	Semi-finals	-
1992	JLSL	1	3rd	10	Semi-finals	-
1993	JLSL	1	6th	10	Runners-up	-
1994	L	1	3rd	10	Runners-up	-
1995	L	1	1st	10	Champion	-
1996	L	1	2nd	10	Semi-finals	Runners-up
1997	L	1	3rd	10	Runners-up	Winner
1998	L	1	4th	10	Champion	Winner
1999	L	1	1st	8	Runners-up	Runners-up
2000	L	1	2nd	9	Semi-finals	-
2001	L	1	4th	10	Champion	-
2002	L	1	4th	11	Quarter-finals	-
2003	L	1	3rd	13	Semi-finals	-
2004	L1	1	4th	8	Semi-finals	-
2005	L1	1	3rd	8	Quarter-finals	-
2006	Nadeshiko; Div.1	1	6th	8	Quarter-finals	-
2007	Nadeshiko; Div.1	1	7th	8	3rd Stage	Group Stage
2008	Nadeshiko; Div.1	1	8th	8	Quarter-finals	-
2009	Nadeshiko Div.2	2	2nd	8	3rd Stage	-
2010	Nadeshiko	1	10th	10	3rd Stage	Group Stage
2011	Nadeshiko	1	6th	9	Semi-finals	-
2012	Nadeshiko	1	7th	10	Semi-finals	Semi-finals
2013	Nadeshiko	1	4th	10	Semi-finals	Group Stage
2014	Nadeshiko	1	9th	10	Quarter-finals	-
2015	Nadeshiko; Div.1	1	7th	10	Quarter-finals	-
2016	Nadeshiko; Div.1	1	6th	10	3rd Stage	Group Stage
2017	Nadeshiko; Div.1	1	10th	10	3rd Stage	Group Stage
2018						
2019						
2020						
2021						
2022						
2023						

== Transition of team name ==
- Iga-Ueno Kunoichi SC : 1976 - 1988
- Prima Ham FC Kunoichi : 1989 - 1999
- Iga FC Kunoichi : 2000 – 2019
- Iga FC Kunoichi Mie : 2020 – Present

== Home ground ==
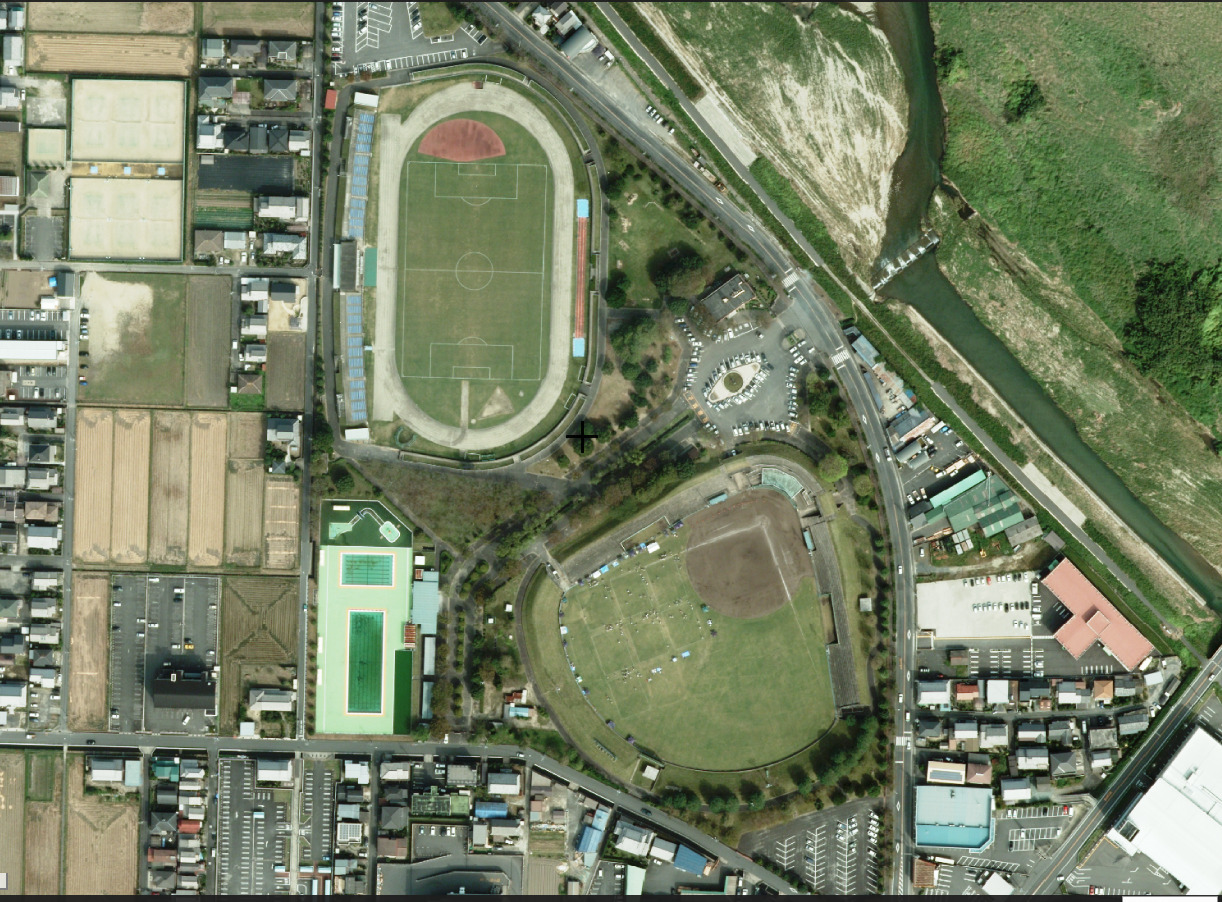
Ueno Sports Park
