= 2015 Nadeshiko League =

Nadeshiko League
- Season: 2015
- Champions: NTV Beleza; 13th Nadeshiko League title
- Relegated: AS Elfen Saitama
- Top goalscorer: Yuika Sugasawa (15 goals)

The 2015 Nadeshiko League season was won by NTV Beleza, who have won the title 13 times.

== Nadeshiko League Division 1 ==
=== First stage : Regular series ===
| Pos | Team | Pld | W | D | L | GF | GA | GD | Pts | 2nd Stage : Ex.Pts |
|---|---|---|---|---|---|---|---|---|---|---|
| 1 | NTV Beleza | 18 | 13 | 4 | 1 | 41 | 9 | +32 | 43 | Championship League : 6 |
| 2 | INAC Kobe Leonessa | 18 | 13 | 3 | 2 | 36 | 18 | +18 | 42 | Championship League : 5 |
| 3 | Vegalta Sendai Ladies | 18 | 11 | 3 | 4 | 40 | 26 | +14 | 36 | Championship League : 4 |
| 4 | JEF United Ichihara Chiba Ladies | 18 | 8 | 8 | 2 | 25 | 12 | +13 | 32 | Championship League : 3 |
| 5 | Albirex Niigata Ladies | 18 | 8 | 2 | 8 | 20 | 17 | +3 | 26 | Championship League : 2 |
| 6 | Urawa Red Diamonds Ladies | 18 | 6 | 5 | 7 | 20 | 18 | +2 | 23 | Championship League : 1 |
| 7 | Okayama Yunogo Belle | 18 | 5 | 3 | 10 | 16 | 34 | −18 | 18 | Position Playoff : 6 |
| 8 | Iga F.C. Kunoichi | 18 | 4 | 2 | 12 | 12 | 30 | −18 | 14 | Position Playoff : 5 |
| 9 | Speranza F.C. Osaka-Takatsuki | 18 | 2 | 4 | 12 | 14 | 32 | −18 | 10 | Position Playoff : 3 |
| 10 | AS Elfen Saitama | 18 | 2 | 2 | 14 | 8 | 36 | −28 | 8 | Position Playoff : 3 |

=== Second stage : Exciting series ===
==== Championship league ====
| Pos | Team | Pld | W | D | L | GF | GA | GD | BP | Pts | Qualification |
|---|---|---|---|---|---|---|---|---|---|---|---|
| 1 | NTV Beleza | 5 | 3 | 1 | 1 | 7 | 3 | +4 | 6 | 16 | Season Champions |
| 2 | Vegalta Sendai Ladies | 5 | 2 | 2 | 1 | 11 | 10 | +1 | 4 | 12 | |
| 3 | INAC Kobe Leonessa | 5 | 1 | 2 | 2 | 6 | 7 | −1 | 5 | 10 | |
| 4 | Albirex Niigata Ladies | 5 | 2 | 1 | 2 | 10 | 8 | +2 | 2 | 9 | |
| 5 | JEF United Ichihara Chiba Ladies | 5 | 1 | 3 | 1 | 7 | 8 | −1 | 3 | 9 | |
| 6 | Urawa Red Diamonds Ladies | 5 | 1 | 1 | 3 | 8 | 13 | −5 | 1 | 5 | |

==== Position playoff ====
| Pos | Team | Pld | W | D | L | GF | GA | GD | BP | Pts | Qualification or relegation |
|---|---|---|---|---|---|---|---|---|---|---|---|
| 7 | Iga F.C. Kunoichi | 6 | 4 | 1 | 1 | 8 | 3 | +5 | 5 | 18 | |
| 8 | Okayama Yunogo Belle | 6 | 2 | 3 | 1 | 7 | 6 | +1 | 6 | 15 | |
| 9 | Speranza F.C. Osaka-Takatsuki | 6 | 2 | 1 | 3 | 7 | 10 | −3 | 3 | 10 | Division 1 promotion/relegation Series |
| 10 | AS Elfen Saitama | 6 | 1 | 1 | 4 | 6 | 9 | −3 | 3 | 7 | Relegated for Division 2 |

=== League awards ===
==== Best player ====
| Player | Club |
|---|---|
| (Japan) Mizuho Sakaguchi | NTV Beleza |

==== Top scorers ====
| Rank | Scorer | Club | Goals |
|---|---|---|---|
| 1 | (Japan) Yuika Sugasawa | JEF United Ichihara Chiba Ladies | 15 |
| 2 | (Japan) Mina Tanaka | NTV Beleza | 14 |
| 3 | (Japan) Mizuho Sakaguchi | NTV Beleza | 9 |
| 3 | (Japan) Yuri Kawamura | Vegalta Sendai Ladies | 9 |

==== Best eleven ====
| Pos | Player | Club |
|---|---|---|
| GK | (Japan) Ayaka Yamashita | NTV Beleza |
| DF | (Japan) Saori Ariyoshi | NTV Beleza |
| DF | (Japan) Tomoko Muramatsu | NTV Beleza |
| DF | (Japan) Azusa Iwashimizu | NTV Beleza |
| MF | (Japan) Yuri Kawamura | Vegalta Sendai Ladies |
| MF | (Japan) Hanae Shibata | Urawa Reds Ladies |
| MF | (Japan) Mizuho Sakaguchi | NTV Beleza |
| MF | (Japan) Natsuko Hara | NTV Beleza |
| MF | (Japan) Megumi Kamionobe | Albirex Niigata Ladies |
| FW | (Japan) Mina Tanaka | NTV Beleza |
| FW | (Japan) Yuika Sugasawa | JEF United Ichihara Chiba Ladies |

==== Best young player ====
| Player | Club |
|---|---|
| (Japan) Kiko Seike | Urawa Red Diamonds Ladies |

== Nadeshiko League Division 2 ==
=== Result ===
| Pos | Team | Pld | W | D | L | GF | GA | GD | Pts | Promotion or relegation |
|---|---|---|---|---|---|---|---|---|---|---|
| 1 | AC Nagano Parceiro Ladies | 27 | 22 | 1 | 4 | 85 | 25 | +60 | 67 | Promoted for Division 1 |
| 2 | Nojima Stella Kanagawa Sagamihara | 27 | 21 | 1 | 5 | 91 | 33 | +58 | 64 | Division 1 promotion/relegation Series |
| 3 | Nippon Sport Science University Fields Yokohama | 27 | 18 | 2 | 7 | 65 | 29 | +36 | 56 | |
| 4 | Sfida Setagaya F.C. | 27 | 12 | 4 | 11 | 45 | 40 | +5 | 40 | |
| 5 | Angeviolet Hiroshima | 27 | 12 | 3 | 12 | 38 | 40 | −2 | 39 | |
| 6 | Ehime F.C. Ladies | 27 | 10 | 4 | 13 | 42 | 59 | −17 | 34 | |
| 7 | AS Harima ALBION | 27 | 8 | 8 | 11 | 39 | 41 | −2 | 32 | |
| 8 | F.C. Kibi International University Charme | 27 | 8 | 1 | 18 | 33 | 53 | −20 | 25 | |
| 9 | Fukuoka J. Anclas | 27 | 6 | 5 | 16 | 24 | 70 | −46 | 23 | Division 2 promotion/relegation Series |
| 10 | Japan Soccer College Ladies | 27 | 2 | 3 | 22 | 16 | 88 | −72 | 9 | Relegated for Division 3 |

- Best Player: Kumi Yokoyama, AC Nagano Parceiro Ladies
- Top scorers: Kumi Yokoyama, AC Nagano Parceiro Ladies
- Best young player: Takako Gonno, Nojima Stella Kanagawa Sagamihara

== Challenge League (Division 3) ==
=== Regular season ===
==== East ====
| Pos | Team | Pld | W | D | L | GF | GA | GD | Pts | Qualification |
|---|---|---|---|---|---|---|---|---|---|---|
| 1 | Yokohama F.C. Seagulls | 15 | 11 | 1 | 3 | 39 | 13 | +26 | 34 | Championship Playoff |
| 2 | Tokiwagi Gakuen High School LSC | 15 | 9 | 2 | 4 | 32 | 14 | +18 | 29 | Championship Playoff |
| 3 | Niigata University of Health and Welfare L.S.C. | 15 | 6 | 3 | 6 | 31 | 30 | +1 | 21 | |
| 4 | Yamato Sylphid | 15 | 5 | 3 | 7 | 21 | 26 | −5 | 18 | |
| 5 | Norddea Hokkaido | 15 | 5 | 3 | 7 | 19 | 41 | −22 | 18 | |
| 6 | Tsukuba F.C. Ladies | 15 | 1 | 4 | 10 | 8 | 26 | −18 | 7 | Division 3 promotion/relegation Series |

==== West ====
| Pos | Team | Pld | W | D | L | GF | GA | GD | Pts | Qualification |
|---|---|---|---|---|---|---|---|---|---|---|
| 1 | Cerezo Osaka Sakai Ladies | 15 | 13 | 2 | 0 | 45 | 15 | +30 | 41 | Championship Playoff |
| 2 | Shizuoka Sangyo University Iwata Bonita | 15 | 7 | 2 | 6 | 21 | 23 | −2 | 23 | Championship Playoff |
| 3 | JFA Academy Fukushima L.S.C. | 15 | 6 | 2 | 7 | 27 | 28 | −1 | 20 | |
| 4 | Bunnys Kyoto S.C. | 15 | 5 | 4 | 6 | 26 | 23 | +3 | 19 | |
| 5 | NGU Nagoya F.C. Ladies | 15 | 4 | 1 | 10 | 15 | 28 | −13 | 13 | |
| 6 | Mashiki Renaissance Kumamoto F.C. | 15 | 4 | 1 | 10 | 12 | 29 | −17 | 13 | Division 3 promotion/relegation Series |

=== Championship playoff ===
| Pos | Team | Pld | W | D | L | GF | GA | GD | Pts | Promotion or qualification |
|---|---|---|---|---|---|---|---|---|---|---|
| 1 | Tokiwagi Gakuen High School LSC | 3 | 2 | 1 | 0 | 5 | 2 | +3 | 7 | Season Champions |
| 2 | Cerezo Osaka Sakai Ladies | 3 | 2 | 0 | 1 | 11 | 6 | +5 | 6 | Promoted for Division 2 |
| 3 | Yokohama F.C. Seagulls | 3 | 1 | 1 | 1 | 4 | 7 | −3 | 4 | Division 2 promotion/relegation Series |
| 4 | Shizuoka Sangyo University Iwata Bonita | 3 | 0 | 0 | 3 | 3 | 8 | −5 | 0 | |

- Best Player: Rikako Kobayashi, Tokiwagi Gakuen High School LSC
- Top scorers: Rikako Kobayashi, Tokiwagi Gakuen High School LSC
- Best young player: Miyuki Takahashi, Niigata University of Health and Welfare L.S.C.

== Promotion/relegation series ==
=== Division 1 promotion/relegation series ===
2015-12-5
13:00

| Nojima Stella Kanagawa Sagamihara | 2 - 2 | Speranza F.C. Osaka-Takatsuki |

Sagamihara Gion Stadium

2015-12-12
13:00

| Speranza F.C. Osaka-Takatsuki | 0 - 0 | Nojima Stella Kanagawa Sagamihara |

Takatsuki Hagitani Soccer Stadium
- Speranza F.C. Osaka-Takatsuki stay Division 1 in 2016 Season.
- Nojima Stella Kanagawa Sagamihara stay Division 2 in 2016 Season.

=== Division 2 promotion/relegation series ===
2015-12-6
13:00

| Yokohama F.C. Seagulls | 1 - 1 | Fukuoka J. Anclas |

Atsugi-shi Ogino Sports Park Stadium

2015-12-13
12:00

| Fukuoka J. Anclas | 0 - 1 | Yokohama F.C. Seagulls |

Ogori-shi Athletics Stadium
- Yokohama F.C. Seagulls Promoted to Division 2 in 2016 Season.
- Fukuoka J. Anclas Relegated to Division 3 (Challenge League) in 2016 Season.

=== Division 3 promotion/relegation series ===
==== Qualifying round ====
| Pos | Team | Pld | W | D | L | GF | GA | GD | Pts | Qualification |
|---|---|---|---|---|---|---|---|---|---|---|
| 1 | Orca Kamogawa F.C. | 3 | 3 | 0 | 0 | 13 | 3 | +10 | 9 | Final Round A |
| 2 | INAC Kobe Leoncheena | 3 | 1 | 1 | 1 | 3 | 8 | −5 | 4 | Final Round B |
| 3 | Cerezo Osaka Sakai girls | 3 | 0 | 2 | 1 | 4 | 6 | −2 | 2 | |
| 4 | Diosa Izumo F.C. | 3 | 0 | 1 | 2 | 5 | 8 | −3 | 1 | |

==== Final Round A ====
2015-12-5
14:00

| Orca Kamogawa F.C. | 1 - 0 | Mashiki Renaissance Kumamoto F.C. |

Kamogawa-shi Athletics Stadium

2015-12-13
13:00

| Mashiki Renaissance Kumamoto F.C. | 2 - 1 | Orca Kamogawa F.C. |

Kikuchi-shi Shichijo Sports Park
- Orca Kamogawa F.C. Promoted to Division 3 (Challenge League) in 2016 Season.
- Mashiki Renaissance Kumamoto F.C. Relegated to Regional League (Kyushu, Q League) in 2016 Season.

==== Final Round B ====
2015-12-6
12:00

| INAC Kobe Leoncheena | 0 - 2 | Tsukuba F.C. Ladies |

Miki Sogobousai Park Athletics Stadium

2015-12-13
11:00

| Tsukuba F.C. Ladies | 1 - 0 | INAC Kobe Leoncheena |

Sekisyu Challenge Stadium
- Tsukuba F.C. Ladies Stay Division 3 (Challenge League) in 2016 Season.
- INAC Kobe Leoncheena Stay Regional League (Kansai League) in 2016 Season.

== See also ==
- Empress's Cup
