= 2020 Nadeshiko League =

The 2020 Nadeshiko League was the 32nd season of the Nadeshiko League, the main league for women's association football in Japan. It was also the 16th season in its current format.

The league was originally scheduled to begin on 2 May 2020 but was delayed due to the COVID-19 pandemic. The league was finally rescheduled to begin on 18 July 2020 with the first two rounds of matches played behind closed doors.

== Division 1 ==
Nadeshiko League Division 1
- Season: 2020
- Dates: 18 July 2020 – 21 November 2020
- Champions: Urawa Reds Ladies (4th title)
- Relegated: Cerezo Osaka; Iga Kunoichi; Ehime
- AFC Women's Club Championship: Urawa Reds Ladies
- Matches: 90
- Goals: 273 (3.03 per match)
- Top goalscorer: Yuika Sugasawa (17 goals)
- Biggest home win: Mynavi Vegalta Sendai 5–0 Ehime (1 November 2020) INAC Kobe Leonessa 5–0 Ehime (30 August 2020)
- Biggest away win: Cerezo Osaka 1–10 NTV Beleza (15 August 2020)
- Highest scoring: Cerezo Osaka 1–10 NTV Beleza (15 August 2020)
- Longest winning run: Urawa Reds Ladies (6 matches)
- Longest unbeaten run: Urawa Reds Ladies (8 matches)
- Longest winless run: Ehime (9 matches)
- Longest losing run: Iga FC Kunoichi (6 matches)
- All statistics correct as of 21 November 2020.

The season started on 18 July 2020 and ended in November 2020 with the play-offs to be held days later. Prior to the league start date, PCR were carried out on all the players and staffs of the teams participating in the leagues to check their health conditions, almost all test cases came out negative.

Urawa Reds Ladies won their fourth Nadeshiko League title and therefore will earn the right to participate in the 2021 AFC Women's Club Championship.

This is its final year as the highest division of the Japan women's football league system as the WE League is set to commence next year. Similar to the men's J. League in 1992 and the English women's FA WSL in 2011, not all Division 1 clubs will be admitted to the new league.

=== Teams ===
The league was contested by 10 teams, debutants Ehime winners of the 2019 Nadeshiko League Division 2 and runners up Cerezo Osaka replaced Nittidai and AC Nagano Parceiro Ladies, who were relegated from the 2019 Nadeshiko League Division 1.

Club	Hometown(s)	First season in top flight	Current spell in top flight
NTV Beleza	Inagi, Tokyo	1989	1989–present
INAC Kobe Leonessa	Kobe, Hyogo	2005	2005–present
Mynavi Vegalta Sendai	Sendai, Miyagi	2013	2013–present
Albirex Niigata	Niigata Prefecture	2007	2007–present
Cerezo Osaka	Osaka	2018	2020–present
Ehime	Matsuyama	2020	2020–present
JEF United Chiba	Chiba, Chiba	2000	2009–present
Urawa Reds Ladies	Saitama, Saitama	1999	1999–present
Nojima Stella	Sagamihara, Kanagawa	2017	2017–present
Iga Kunoichi	Iga, Mie	1989	2019–present

Locations of 2020 Nadeshiko League Division 1 teams

=== Table ===
Pos	Team	Pld	W	D	L	GF	GA	GD	Pts	Qualification or relegation
1	Urawa Reds Ladies	18	14	2	2	37	17	+20	44	Champions, form WE League
2	INAC Kobe Leonessa	18	11	2	5	33	19	+14	35	Form WE League
3	NTV Beleza	18	9	4	5	45	22	+23	31	Form WE League
4	Cerezo Osaka	18	8	6	4	32	36	−4	30	
5	Albirex Niigata	18	8	3	7	19	17	+2	27	Form WE League
6	JEF United Chiba	18	6	5	7	30	29	+1	23	Form WE League
7	Mynavi Vegalta Sendai	18	6	4	8	26	24	+2	22	Form WE League
8	Nojima Stella	18	4	3	11	18	30	−12	15	Form WE League
9	Iga Kunoichi	18	4	2	12	17	33	−16	14	
10	Ehime	18	3	3	12	16	46	−30	12	

Source: Soccerway
Rules for classification: 1) Points; 2) Goal difference; 3) Number of goals scored; 4) Head-to-head points; 5) Head-to-head goal difference; 6) Head-to-head away goals scored

=== Results ===
Home \ Away	ALB	CER	EHI	INA	IGA	JEF	NTV	NOJ	URA	VEG
Albirex Niigata	—	0–1	2–0	2–1	1–1	2–0	0–0	1–0	2–3	0–1
Cerezo Osaka	2–1	—	3–2	2–0	2–1	2–2	1–10	3–1	0–0	2–2
Ehime	1–0	3–2	—	0–1	2–1	1–5	1–5	2–2	0–1	0–2
INAC	2–0	3–1	5–0	—	2–1	2–0	4–1	2–1	0–1	3–0
Iga Kunoichi	0–1	2–2	3–0	0–1	—	0–5	1–6	3–1	0–1	0–2
JEF United	1–2	3–3	0–0	2–1	2–1	—	1–3	1–2	2–4	1–1
NTV Beleza	2–2	1–1	2–2	1–2	3–0	0–1	—	1–0	3–2	4–1
Nojima Stella	0–1	0–3	2–1	1–1	0–1	1–3	2–1	—	2–3	2–1
Urawa Reds Ladies	2–1	0–1	5–1	4–1	2–1	2–0	1–0	1–1	—	2–1
Vegalta Sendai	0–1	5–1	5–0	2–2	0–1	1–1	0–2	1–0	1–2	—

Source: Soccerway
Legend: Blue = home team win; Yellow = draw; Red = away team win.

=== Positions by round ===
Team ╲ Round	1	2	3	4	5	6	7	8	9	10	11	12	13	14	15	16	17	18
Urawa Reds Ladies	1	1	1	3	1	1	1	1	1	1	1	1	1	1	1	1	1	1
INAC Kobe	5	4	2	2	3	4	3	3	3	4	4	4	3	2	2	2	2	2
NTV Beleza	3	2	4	4	4	2	2	2	2	2	2	2	2	3	3	3	3	3
Cerezo Osaka	2	3	3	1	2	3	4	4	4	3	3	3	4	4	4	5	4	4
Albirex Niigata	4	6	6	5	5	5	6	5	5	5	5	5	5	5	5	4	5	5
JEF United	10	5	7	7	6	8	8	8	9	9	7	8	6	6	7	7	6	6
Vegalta Sendai	8	10	10	10	10	7	7	9	8	8	6	6	7	7	6	6	7	7
Nojima Stella	9	9	8	9	9	6	5	6	6	7	9	7	8	8	8	8	8	8
Iga FC	7	8	9	8	7	10	9	7	7	6	8	9	9	9	9	9	9	9
Ehime	6	7	5	6	8	9	10	10	10	10	10	10	10	10	10	10	10	10

Source: Soccerway
= Leader; = To Relegation Series; = Relegation to Nadeshiko League Division 2

=== Attendance ===
(Note: Due to the COVID-19 pandemic, spectators were not allowed into stadiums.)

=== Statistics ===
==== Topscorers ====
As of matches played on 21 November 2020.

Rank	Player	Club	Goals
1	(Japan) Yuika Sugasawa	Urawa Reds Ladies	17
2	(Japan) Haruka Hamada	Vegalta Sendai	15
3	(Japan) Mina Tanaka	INAC Kobe Leonessa	13
4	(Japan) Rikako Kobayashi	NTV Beleza	9
4	(Japan) Ami Otaki	JEF United	9
6	(Japan) Jun Endo	NTV Beleza	8
7	(Japan) Yui Hasegawa	NTV Beleza	7
7	(Japan) Honoka Hayashi	Cerezo Osaka	7
7	(Japan) Arisa Minamino	Nojima Stella	7
10	4 players		6

== Division 2 ==
Nadeshiko League Division 2
- Season: 2020
- Dates: 18 July – 21 November 2020
- Matches: 90
- Goals: 225 (2.5 per match)
- Biggest home win: Harima 4–0 Nittaidai (24 October 2020) Elfen Saitama 4–0 Nittaidai (26 July 2020) Kamogawa 4–0 Bunnys Kyoto (20 September 2020)
- Highest scoring: Sfida Setagaya 5–2 Jumonji Ventus (20 September 2020)
- All statistics correct as of 15 November 2020.

The season began on 18 July 2020.

=== Teams and format ===
10 teams contested the league, Jumonji Ventus were promoted while Shizuoka Sangyo were relegated from the previous season, additionally Nittaidai and Nagano Parceiro Ladies also joined from the Nadeshiko League Division 1.

=== League table ===
Pos	Team	Pld	W	D	L	GF	GA	GD	Pts	Promotion or relegation
1	Sfida Setagaya	18	11	4	3	34	18	+16	37	
2	Elfen Saitama	18	11	3	4	33	13	+20	36	Promoted to WE League
3	Kamogawa	18	10	4	4	37	18	+19	34	
4	Yokohama	18	8	8	2	29	8	+21	32	
5	Nagano Parceiro	18	8	4	6	22	13	+9	28	Promoted to WE League
6	Harima	18	8	2	8	25	22	+3	26	
7	Yamato Sylphid	18	7	5	6	15	16	−1	26	
8	Jumonji Ventus	18	3	4	11	15	40	−25	13	Promoted to WE League
9	Nittaidai	18	2	3	13	7	46	−39	9	
10	Bunnys Kyoto	18	1	5	12	8	31	−23	8	

Source: Soccerway

=== Results ===
Home \ Away	KYO	ELF	HAR	JUM	KAM	NIT	NAG	SET	YAM	YOK
Bunnys Kyoto	—	0–3	1–3	0–1	0–3	0–1	0–3	1–2	2–1	0–1
Elfen Saitama	2–1	—	4–1	1–0	5–1	4–0	1–2	1–1	0–1	0–0
Harima	0–0	0–1	—	2–1	0–1	4–0	1–2	3–0	2–1	1–0
Jumonji Ventus	2–2	1–2	2–1	—	1–4	2–0	0–5	0–5	0–2	0–5
Kamogawa	4–0	2–2	3–0	3–0	—	4–1	0–0	0–1	2–1	0–0
Nittaidai	0–0	1–0	0–5	1–1	0–5	—	1–3	0–2	1–1	0–5
Nagano Parceiro	1–1	0–1	0–1	1–0	1–2	2–0	—	1–1	0–1	0–0
Sfida Setagaya	3–0	0–3	2–0	5–2	3–1	2–1	2–0	—	1–2	2–2
Yamato Sylphid	1–0	0–3	0–0	0–0	1–0	2–0	0–1	1–1	—	0–3
Yokohama	0–0	2–0	4–1	1–1	2–2	3–0	1–0	0–1	0–0	—

Source: Soccerway
Legend: Blue = home team win; Yellow = draw; Red = away team win.

== Challenge League ==
Challenge League (Division 3)
- Season: 2020
- Champions: JFA Academy
- All statistics correct as of 30 December 2020.

12 teams contested the third tier, divided into two groups of 6 each for East and West. Newly promoted clubs were Shizuoka SSU Asregina (formerly Iwata Bonita) and Fukuoka J. Anclas, both returning to the national tiers, and Cerezo Osaka Sakai Girls, Cerezo Osaka Sakai Ladies's B-team.

=== Teams ===
Clubs (East)	Hometown(s)
Norddea Hokkaido	Sapporo, Hokkaido
Tsukuba FC Ladies	Tsukuba, Ibaraki
Niigata University of Health and Welfare LSC	Niigata, Niigata
JFA Academy Fukushima LSC	Susono, Shizuoka
Shizuoka SSU Asregina	Iwata, Shizuoka
NGU Loveledge Nagoya	Nagoya, Aichi
Clubs (West)	Hometown(s)
Speranza Osaka Takatsuki	Takatsuki, Osaka
Cerezo Osaka Sakai Girls	Osaka
KIU Charme	Takahashi, Okayama
Yunogo Belle	Mimasaka, Okayama
Angeviolet Hiroshima	Hiroshima
Fukuoka J. Anclas	Fukuoka

=== Challenge League Championship ===
December 12, 2020

Angeviolet Hiroshima	0–0	JFA Academy Fukushima LSC

December 20, 2020

JFA Academy Fukushima LSC	1–0	Angeviolet Hiroshima
Numao 77'

JFA Academy wins the title.

=== Challenge League Third Place ===
December 12, 2020

Speranza Osaka-Takatsuki	0–0	NGU Loveledge Nagoya

December 19, 2020

NGU Loveledge Nagoya	0–1 (a.e.t.)	Speranza Osaka-Takatsuki
		Sakanaka 106'

Speranza is promoted to the Nadeshiko League.
