= 2019 Empress's Cup =

Football tournament season

Tournament details
- Country: Japan
- Dates: 2 November – 29 December 2019
- Teams: 48

Final positions
- Champions: Tokyo Verdy Beleza (13th title)
- Runners-up: Urawa Red Diamonds

Tournament statistics
- Matches played: 47

The 2019 Empress's Cup was the 42nd season of the Japanese women's football main cup competition.

== Calendar and schedule ==
Below are the dates for each round as given by the official schedule:

Round	Date(s)	Number of fixtures	Clubs
First round	2 & 3 November	16	32 → 16
Round of 32	23 & 24 November	10	32 (16+16) → 16
Round of 16	30 Nov–4 Dec	8	16 → 8
Quarter-finals	8 December	4	8 → 4
Semi-finals	22 December	2	4 → 2
Final	29 December	1	2 → 1

=== First round ===
No.	Home	Score	Away
1	Yamato Sylphid	3–1	Tokuyama University
2	Teikyo Heisei University	2–1	Daisho Gakuen High School
3	Tokyo Verdy Menina	4–1	Seiwa Gakuen High School
4	Waseda University	3–1	KIU Charme Okayama
5	Sendai University	0–2	HBU Meisei High School
6	NGU Loveledge Nagoya	2–1	Norddea Hokkaido
7	Sakuyo High School	4–0	Albirex Niigata U-18
8	Bunnys Gunma White Star	1–6	AS Harima Albion
9	Tokiwagi Gakuen High School	2–1	Toyo University
10	SSU Iwata Bonita	1–1 (5-3 pen.)	FC Imabari
11	Hinomoto Gakuen High School	1–2	Albirex Niigata
12	Energic Ryukyu Deigos	0–2	JFA Academy Fukushima
13	Fujieda Junshin High School	2–0	Kunimi FC
14	Osaka Gakugei High School	1–4	Okayama Yunogo Belle
15	Bunny's Kyoto SC	2–2 (3-1 pen.)	Yamanashi Gakuin University
16	Ange Violet Hiroshima	0–1	Speranza Osaka-Takatsuki

=== Round of 32 ===
No.	Home	Score	Away
17	Tokyo Verdy Beleza	4–0	Yamato Sylphid
18	Yokohama FC Seagulls	2–1	Teikyo Heisei University
19	Nagano Parceiro	3–1	Tokyo Verdy Menina
20	Nittaidai SMG Yokohama	1–0	Waseda University
21	Albirex Niigata	8–0	HBU Meisei High School
22	Chifure AS Elfen Saitama	3–0	NGU Loveledge Nagoya
23	JEF United Chiba	1–2	Sakuyo High School
24	Orca Kamogawa	1–0	AS Harima Albion
25	Urawa Red Diamonds	6–0	Tokiwagi Gakuen High School
26	Sfida Setagaya	0–1	SSU Iwata Bonita
27	Iga FC Kunoichi	7–0	Niigata University HW
28	MyNavi Vegalta Sendai	2–1	JFA Academy Fukushima
29	INAC Kobe Leonessa	3–0	Fujieda Junshin High School
30	Cerezo Osaka	4–0	Okayama Yunogo Belle
31	Nojima Stella Kanagawa Sagamihara	2–0	Bunnies Kyoto
32	Ehime FC	0–0 (4-3 pen.)	Speranza Osaka-Takatsuki

=== Round of 16 ===
No.	Home	Score	Away
33	Tokyo Verdy Beleza	5–1	Yokohama FC Seagulls
34	Nagano Parceiro	1–2	Nittaidai SMG Yokohama
35	Albirex Niigata	2–2 (4-5 pen.)	Chifure AS Elfen Saitama
36	Sakuyo High School	0–2	Orca Kamogawa
37	Urawa Red Diamonds	3–0	SSU Iwata Bonita
38	Iga FC Kunoichi	1–2	MyNavi Vegalta Sendai
39	INAC Kobe Leonessa	4–0	Cerezo Osaka
40	Nojima Stella Kanagawa Sagamihara	3–0	Ehime FC

=== Quarter-finals ===
No.	Home	Score	Away
41	Tokyo Verdy Beleza	5–0	Nittaidai SMG Yokohama
42	Chifure AS Elfen Saitama	3–2	Orca Kamogawa
43	Urawa Red Diamonds	1–0	MyNavi Vegalta Sendai
44	INAC Kobe Leonessa	1–0	Nojima Stella Kanagawa Sagamihara

=== Semi-finals ===
No.	Home	Score	Away
45	Tokyo Verdy Beleza	2–1	Chifure AS Elfen Saitama
46	Urawa Red Diamonds	3–2	INAC Kobe Leonessa

=== Final ===
29 December
14:00

Tokyo Verdy Beleza	1−0	Urawa Red Diamonds
Mina Tanaka 7'	Report (JFA)

NACK5 Stadium Omiya, Saitama, Saitama Prefecture
Attendance: 10,012
Referee: Yoshimi Yamashita
