= 2013 Nadeshiko League =

Nadeshiko League
- Season: 2013
- Champions: INAC Kobe Leonessa; 3rd Nadeshiko League title
- Relegated: Speranza F.C. Osaka-Takatsuki
- Top goalscorer: Beverly Goebel-Yanez (15 goals)

The 2013 Nadeshiko League season was won by INAC Kobe Leonessa, who defended their 2012 title.

== Nadeshiko League (Division 1) ==
=== Result ===
Pos	Team	Pld	W	D	L	GF	GA	GD	Pts	Qualification or relegation
1	INAC Kobe Leonessa	18	16	0	2	62	13	+49	48	Champions
2	NTV Beleza	18	12	2	4	36	15	+21	38	
3	Okayama Yunogo Belle	18	10	4	4	31	19	+12	34	
4	Iga F.C. Kunoichi	18	8	4	6	20	17	+3	28	
5	Vegalta Sendai Ladies	18	8	4	6	23	24	−1	28	
6	Urawa Red Diamonds Ladies	18	6	3	9	23	26	−3	21	
7	JEF United Ichihara Chiba Ladies	18	5	6	7	15	20	−5	21	
8	Albirex Niigata Ladies	18	5	4	9	27	32	−5	19	
9	F.C. Kibi International University Charme	18	3	3	12	17	49	−32	12	Division 1 promotion/relegation Series
10	Speranza F.C. Osaka-Takatsuki	18	0	4	14	5	44	−39	4	Relegated to Division 2

=== League awards ===
==== Best player ====
Player	Club
(Japan) Nahomi Kawasumi	INAC Kobe Leonessa

==== Top scorers ====
Rank	Scorer	Club	Goals
1	(United States) Beverly Goebel-Yanez	INAC Kobe Leonessa	15
2	(Japan) Nahomi Kawasumi	INAC Kobe Leonessa	12
3	(Japan) Minami Tanaka	NTV Beleza	10
4	(South Korea) Ji So-Yun	INAC Kobe Leonessa	9
5	(Japan) Nanase Kiryu	NTV Beleza	8
5	(Japan) Saori Arimachi	Okayama Yunogo Belle	8

==== Best eleven ====
Pos	Player	Club
GK	(Japan) Ayumi Kaihori	INAC Kobe Leonessa
DF	(Japan) Kana Osafune	Vegalta Sendai Ladies
DF	(Japan) Saori Ariyoshi	NTV Beleza
DF	(Japan) Azusa Iwashimizu	NTV Beleza
DF	(Japan) Emi Nakajima	INAC Kobe Leonessa
MF	(Japan) Aya Miyama	Okayama Yunogo Belle
MF	(South Korea) Ji So-Yun	INAC Kobe Leonessa
MF	(Japan) Mizuho Sakaguchi	NTV Beleza
FW	(United States) Beverly Goebel-Yanez	INAC Kobe Leonessa
FW	(Japan) Nahomi Kawasumi	INAC Kobe Leonessa
FW	(Japan) Nanase Kiryu	NTV Beleza

==== Best young player ====
Player	Club
(Japan) Saki Ueno	JEF United Ichihara Chiba Ladies

== Challenge League (Division 2) ==
=== Result ===
Pos	Team	Pld	W	D	L	GF	GA	GD	Pts	Promotion or relegation
1	Tokiwagi Gakuen High School L.S.C.	22	20	0	2	89	21	+68	60	
2	AS Elfen Sayama F.C.	22	19	2	1	96	13	+83	59	Promoted for Division 1
3	Sfida Setagaya F.C.	22	17	0	5	86	28	+58	51	Division 1 promotion/relegation Series
4	Nojima Stella Kanagawa	22	15	3	4	81	23	+58	48	
5	Fukuoka J. Anclas	22	14	1	7	54	37	+17	43	
6	Shizuoka Sangyo University Iwata Bonita	22	12	4	6	54	33	+21	40	
7	JFA Academy Fukushima L.S.C.	22	9	6	7	49	29	+20	33	
8	Ehime F.C. Ladies	22	10	2	10	51	47	+4	32	
9	Nippon Sport Science University L.S.C.	22	9	2	11	38	37	+1	29	
10	Japan Soccer College Ladies	22	8	4	10	34	35	−1	28	
11	AC Nagano Parceiro Ladies	22	9	1	12	34	55	−21	28	
12	Bunnys Kyoto S.C.	22	7	5	10	29	43	−14	26	
13	Cerezo Osaka Sakai Ladies	22	5	3	14	38	74	−36	18	
14	Shimizudaihachi Pleiades	22	3	1	18	19	90	−71	10	
15	Je Vrille Kagoshima	22	1	1	20	12	118	−106	4	Division 2 promotion/relegation Series
16	Hoyo Sukarabu F.C.	22	0	1	21	5	86	−81	1	Dissolved

- Best Player: Akari Shiraki, Tokiwagi Gakuen High School L.S.C.
- Top scorers: Hitomi Mori, Sfida Setagaya F.C.
- Best young player: Rikako Kobayashi, Tokiwagi Gakuen High School L.S.C.

== Promotion/relegation series ==
=== Division 1 promotion/relegation series ===
2013-11-17
13:00

Sfida Setagaya F.C.	0 - 1	F.C. Kibi International University Charme

Nishigaoka Soccer Stadium

2013-11-23
13:00

F.C. Kibi International University Charme	0 - 1 (a.e.t.)	Sfida Setagaya F.C.
Penalties
	5 – 4

Kakogawa Athletic Stadium
- F.C. Kibi International University Charme stay Division 1 in 2014 Season.
- Sfida Setagaya F.C. stay Division 2 in 2014 Season.

=== Division 2 Promotion series ===
==== Qualifiers Block A ====
2013-11-02
10:00

Norddea Hokkaido	1 - 2	Angeviolet Hiroshima

Gotenba, Shizuoka

2013-11-03
10:00

Mashiki Renaissance Kumamoto F.C.	2 - 0	Norddea Hokkaido

Gotenba, Shizuoka

2013-11-04
10:00

Angeviolet Hiroshima	2 - 0	Mashiki Renaissance Kumamoto F.C.

Gotenba, Shizuoka

==== Qualifiers Block B ====
2013-11-02
13:00

Niigata University of Health and Welfare L.S.C.	0 - 0	AS Harima ALBION

Gotenba, Shizuoka

2013-11-03
13:00

NGU Nagoya F.C. Ladies	0 - 0	Niigata University of Health and Welfare L.S.C.

Gotenba, Shizuoka

2013-11-04
13:00

AS Harima ALBION	2 - 1	NGU Nagoya F.C. Ladies

Gotenba, Shizuoka

==== Final ====
2013-11-09
13:00

Angeviolet Hiroshima	1 - 2 (a.e.t.)	AS Harima ALBION

Coca-Cola West Hiroshima Stadium
- AS Harima ALBION Promoted for Division 2 in 2014 Season.
- Angeviolet Hiroshima play to Division 2 promotion/relegation Series.

=== Division 2 promotion/relegation series ===
2013-11-17
12:00

Je Vrille Kagoshima	0 - 3	Angeviolet Hiroshima

Isa Studium, Isa, Kagoshima
- Angeviolet Hiroshima Promoted for Division 2 in 2014 Season.
- Je Vrille Kagoshima Relegated to Regional League (Kyushu, Q League) in 2014 Season.

== See also ==
- Empress's Cup
