= 2011 Nadeshiko League =

L. League
- Season: 2011
- Champions: INAC Kobe Leonessa; 1st L. League title
- Best player: Nahomi Kawasumi
- Top goalscorer: Nahomi Kawasumi (12 goals); Shinobu Ohno (12 goals)

Statistics of Nadeshiko.League in the 2011 season. INAC Kobe Leonessa won the championship.

Nadeshiko League Cup was cancelled due to the devastating damage from 2011 Tōhoku earthquake and tsunami on 11 March. Season opener became Week 5 (29 April) as the earthquake made Week 1 to 4 rescheduled chaotically after 11 June. The 4 games of Week 1 scheduled on 7/30, 7/31, 7/24, 6/11, and Week 2 on 7/24, 8/6, 6/12, 6/12. Such disorder continued until Week 4.

== Nadeshiko League (Division 1) ==
=== Result ===
Pos	Team	Pld	W	D	L	GF	GA	GD	Pts	Qualification
1	INAC Kobe Leonessa	16	13	3	0	49	8	+41	42	Champions
2	NTV Beleza	16	11	2	3	37	11	+26	35	
3	Urawa Red Diamonds Ladies	16	10	3	3	28	16	+12	33	
4	Okayama Yunogo Belle	16	8	4	4	33	21	+12	28	
5	Albirex Niigata Ladies	16	6	4	6	33	25	+8	22	
6	Iga F.C. Kunoichi	16	5	1	10	18	26	−8	16	
7	JEF United Ichihara Chiba Ladies	16	5	1	10	16	29	−13	16	
8	AS Elfen Sayama F.C.	16	3	1	12	21	53	−32	10	
9	Fukuoka J. Anclas	16	1	1	14	13	59	−46	4	
10	TEPCO Mareeze	0	–	–	–	–	–	—	0	Withdrew/Dissolved

=== League awards ===
==== Best player ====
Player	Club
(Japan) Nahomi Kawasumi	INAC Kobe Leonessa

==== Top scorers ====
Rank	Scorer	Club	Goals
1	(Japan) Nahomi Kawasumi	INAC Kobe Leonessa	12
1	(Japan) Shinobu Ohno	INAC Kobe Leonessa	12
3	(Japan) Mana Iwabuchi	NTV Beleza	8
3	(Japan) Chinatsu Kira	Urawa Reds Ladies	8
3	(Japan) Aya Miyama	Okayama Yunogo Belle	8
3	(Japan) Megumi Kamionobe	Albirex Niigata Ladies	8

==== Best eleven ====
Pos	Player	Club
GK	(Japan) Ayumi Kaihori	INAC Kobe Leonessa
DF	(Japan) Yukari Kinga	INAC Kobe Leonessa
DF	(Japan) Kyoko Yano	Urawa Reds Ladies
DF	(Japan) Azusa Iwashimizu	NTV Beleza
DF	(Japan) Asuna Tanaka	INAC Kobe Leonessa
MF	(Japan) Aya Miyama	Okayama Yunogo Belle
MF	(Japan) Mizuho Sakaguchi	Albirex Niigata Ladies
MF	(Japan) Homare Sawa	INAC Kobe Leonessa
FW	(Japan) Shinobu Ohno	INAC Kobe Leonessa
FW	(Japan) Nahomi Kawasumi	INAC Kobe Leonessa
FW	(Japan) Mana Iwabuchi	NTV Beleza

==== Best young player ====
Player	Club
(Japan) Chinatsu Kira	Urawa Reds Ladies

== Challenge League (Division 2) ==
=== Result ===
==== East ====
Pos	Team	Pld	W	D	L	GF	GA	GD	Pts	Qualification
1	Tokiwagi Gakuen High School LSC	15	12	1	2	63	20	+43	37	
2	JFA Academy Fukushima	15	9	3	3	44	23	+21	30	
3	Sfida Setagaya F.C.	15	8	3	4	35	22	+13	27	
4	Nippon Sport Science University	15	7	3	5	33	26	+7	24	
5	AC Nagano Parceiro Ladies	15	2	2	11	14	51	−37	8	
6	Norddea Hokkaido	15	0	2	13	12	59	−47	2	Division 2 promotion/relegation Series

Source: soccerway.com
- Best Player(EAST): Mai Kyokawa, Tokiwagi Gakuen High School L.S.C.
- Top scorers(EAST): Mai Kyokawa, Tokiwagi Gakuen High School L.S.C.

==== West ====
Pos	Team	Pld	W	D	L	GF	GA	GD	Pts	Promotion
1	F.C. Takahashi Charme	15	12	2	1	87	12	+75	38	
2	Speranza F.C. Takatsuki	15	12	2	1	74	13	+61	38	Promoted for Division 1
3	Je Vrille Kagoshima	15	6	3	6	32	24	+8	21	
4	Shizuoka Sangyo University Iwata Bonita	15	6	0	9	49	39	+10	18	
5	Bunnys Kyoto S.C.	15	5	1	9	24	49	−25	16	
6	Aguilas Kobe	15	0	0	15	2	131	−129	0	Dissolved

Source: soccerway.com
- Best Player(WEST): Chiho Takahashi, F.C. Takahashi Charme
- Top scorers(WEST): Akika Nishikawa, F.C. Takahashi Charme

== Promotion/relegation series ==
=== Division 2 Promotion series ===
==== Qualifiers ====
2011-11-03
11:00

Shimizudaihachi Pleiades	1 - 1 (a.e.t.)	Tsukuba F.C. Ladies
	Report
Penalties
	4 – 5

Susono, Shizuoka

2011-11-03
14:00

Mashiki Renaissance Kumamoto F.C.	2 - 1	Toyota Ladies F.C.
	Report

Susono, Shizuoka

==== Semi-final ====
2011-11-05
11:00

Ehime F.C. Ladies	3 - 1	Tsukuba F.C. Ladies
	Report

Susono, Shizuoka

2011-11-05
14:00

Japan Soccer College Ladies	3 - 1	Mashiki Renaissance Kumamoto F.C.
	Report

Susono, Shizuoka

==== Final ====
2011-11-06
11:00

Ehime F.C. Ladies	1 - 2	Japan Soccer College Ladies
	Report

Susono, Shizuoka
- Japan Soccer College Ladies Promoted to Division 2 in 2012 Season.
- Ehime F.C. Ladies play to Division 2 promotion/relegation Series.

=== Division 2 promotion/relegation series ===
2011-11-13
11:00

Ehime F.C. Ladies	2 - 1	Norddea Hokkaido
	Report

Matsuyama, Ehime

2011-11-19
11:00

Norddea Hokkaido	1 - 1	Ehime F.C. Ladies
	Report

Sapporo, Hokkaido
- Ehime F.C. Ladies Promoted to Division 2 in 2012 Season.
- Norddea Hokkaido Relegated to Regional League (Hokkaido League) in 2012 Season.

== See also ==
- Empress's Cup
