= List of women's football clubs in Japan =

This article contains a list of the women's football clubs in Japan. There are many football leagues, including WE League, Nadeshiko League and Regional leagues. Additionally there are leagues for University / College football clubs.

== WE League ==
=== WE League (since 2021) ===
- Albirex Niigata Ladies
- Cerezo Osaka Yanmar Ladies
- Chifure AS Elfen Saitama
- INAC Kobe Leonessa
- JEF United Chiba Ladies
- Mynavi Sendai Ladies
- AC Nagano Parceiro Ladies
- Nippon TV Tokyo Verdy Beleza
- Nojima Stella Kanagawa Sagamihara
- Omiya Ardija Ventus
- Sanfrecce Hiroshima Regina
- Urawa Red Diamonds Ladies

== Nadeshiko League ==
=== Nadeshiko League Div.1 (from 2020) ===
- NTV Beleza (Inagi, Tokyo) (16)
- INAC Kobe Leonessa (Kobe) (3)
- Nagano Parceiro (Nagano)
- Mynavi Vegalta Sendai (Sendai)
- Albirex Niigata (Seiro & Niigata, Niigata)
- Nippon Sport Science University Fields Yokohama (Yokohama)
- JEF United Chiba (Ichihara, Chiba)
- Urawa Red Diamonds (Saitama) (3)
- Nojima Stella (Sagamihara, Kanagawa)
- Iga Kunoichi (Iga, Mie) (2)

=== Nadeshiko League Div.2 (from 2020) ===
- Elfen Saitama (Kawagoe, Saitama)
- Yamato Sylphid (Yamato, Kanagawa)
- Cerezo Osaka (Minamitsumori, Osaka) (Until 2022–23)
- Ehime (Matsuyama, Ehime)
- Sfida Setagaya (Setagaya, Tokyo)
- Shizuoka Sagyo Univ (Iwata, Shizuoka)
- Harima (Himeji, Hyogo)
- Nippatsu Yokohama F.C. Seagulls (Yokohama)
- Bunnys Kyoto (Nagaokakyo, Kyoto)
- Orca Kamogawa (Kamogawa, Chiba)

=== Challenge League (Div.3) (until 2020 defunct) ===
==== East ====
- Yunogo Belle (Mimasaka, Okayama)
- Norddea Hokkaido (Sapporo)
- Tokiwagi Gakuen High School L.S.C. (Sendai)
- Niigata University of Health and Welfare L.S.C. (Niigata)
- Tsukuba F.C. Ladies (Tsukuba)
- FC Jumonji Ventus (Tokyo)

==== West ====
- Angeviolet Hiroshima (Hiroshima)
- JFA Academy Fukushima L.F.C. (Fukushima)
- Fukuoka J. Anclas (Kasuga, Fukuoka)
- NGU Loveledge Nagoya (Nagoya)

=== Past participating ===
- Nissan F.C. Ladies
- Tokyo SHiDAX L.S.C. (ex Shinko Seiko F.C. Clair)
- Fujita Soccer Club Mercury
- Nikko Securities Dream Ladies
- Shiroki F.C. Serena
- OKI F.C. Winds
- Suzuyo Shimizu F.C. Lovely Ladies
- Urawa Ladies F.C.
- Tasaki Perule F.C.
- TEPCO Mareeze
- Aguilas Kobe (later Albero Kobe)
- Hoyo Sukarabu F.C.

== Regional League ==
There are eight regional women's football/soccer leagues in Japan; Tohoku region does not have women's regional league.

=== Hokkaido ===
- Hokkaido Bunkyo Univ. Meisei High School L.F.C.
- Hokkaido Otani Muroran High School L.F.C.
- Sapporo Univ. L.S.C. Vista
- Club Fields Linda
- Otaru Hokusyo Corsa'rio
- Hokkaido Lira Consadole

=== Hokushinetsu ===
- Japan Soccer College Ladies
- Niigata University of Health and Welfare L.S.C.
- Albirex Niigata Ladies U-18
- Hokuriku University
- F.C. Schloß Matsumoto
- Toyama Ladies S.C.
- Granscena Niigata F.C. Ladies
- AC Shinsyu University
- Fukui University of Technology L.F.C.
- Japan Soccer College Ladies
- AC Nagano Parceiro Schwester

=== Kanto ===
==== Div.1 ====
- Waseda University Association F.C. Ladies
- Urawa Red Diamonds Ladies Youth
- JEF United Ichihara Chiba Ladies U-18
- NTV Menina
- Kantogakuen University L.S.C.
- Tokyo International University L.S.C.
- University of Tsukuba Women's Soccer Team
- Kanagawa University L.S.C.

==== Div.2 ====
- Keiogijyuku University L.S.C.
- Musashigaoka Jr. College Ciencia
- Syobi University L.S.C.
- Maebashiikuei High School
- Mito Eiko F.C. Ibaragi Ladies
- Kokushikan University L.S.C.
- Toyo University L.S.C.
- Nihonkouku High School L.S.C.

=== Tokai ===
==== Div.1 ====
- Fujieda Junshin High School
- Tokoha Tachibana High School
- Iga F.C. Kunoichi satellite
- Aichi Toho University
- NGU Loveledge Nagoya Youth
- Shimizudaihachi Pleiades

==== Div.2 ====
- Iwata Higashi High School
- Fujieda Junshin S.C. Junior Blue
- Tokoha Tachibana junior High School
- Shigakkan University
- F.C. Gifu Belta
- Lecre MYFC

=== Kansai ===
==== Div.1 ====
- Cerezo Osaka Sakai Girls
- Daisho Gakuen High School L.S.C.
- FC VICTORIES
- Renaissgakuen Koga Ladies
- Takarazuka El Baile Ladies F.C.
- INAC Kobe Leoncheena
- Kobe F.C. Ladies
- F.C. Vitoria
- Kyoto Shiko Soccer Club Ladies
- Konomiya Speranza U-18

==== Div.2 ====
- Kainan F.C. Ladies SHOUT
- F.C. Terra
- F.C. Osaka CRAVO
- Ritto F.C. Libro
- Osaka City Lady's F.C.
- Menina Kobe S.C.
- Vispo Sayama
- Ootsu Victories S.C.
- Diablossa Takada F.C. Ladies
- Riseisya F.C.

=== Chugoku ===
- Tokuyama Univ. L.F.C
- Hiroshima Ohkoh F.C. Ladies
- Diosa Izumo F.C.
- Freyia F.C. Venus
- Aosaki Soccer Club HANAKO
- F.C. RE'VE
- Bingo Fucyu TAM-S
- Yamato Nadeshiko
- Sakuyo High School L.S.C.
- Okayama Yunogo Belle U-18
- Bunkyo High School L.S.C.
- Iwakuni Angels

=== Shikoku ===
- Kochi Ganador F.C.
- Naruto Uzushio High School L.S.C.
- Trefle F.C. Fille
- Shikoku Gakuin University L.S.C.

=== Kyushu ===
==== Div.1 ====
- Yanagigaura High School L.S.C.
- Kumamoto Renaissance FC
- Fukuoka Jo-Gakuin High School L.S.C.
- New Wave KitaKyusyu Ladies
- Syugakukan High School L.S.C.
- Ryukyu Deigos
- Tokai Univ. Fukuoka Women's Football Team
- Vicsale Okinawa Nabiita

==== Div.2 ====
- Kunimi F.C. Ladies
- Oita Trinita Ladies
- F.C. Alegre Caminho
- Kumamoto United S.C.
- Je Vrille Kagoshima
- Melsa Kumamoto F.C.
- Fukuoka J Anclas Nova
- Tokai Univ. Kumamoto Seisyho High School L.S.C

== See also ==
- Women's football (soccer)
- Women's football around the world
- L. League
- Empress's Cup
- List of men's football clubs in Japan
