= 2014 Empress's Cup =

Tournament details
- Country: Japan

Final positions
- Champions: Nippon TV Beleza
- Runners-up: Urawa Reds
- Semifinalists: JEF United Chiba; Vegalta Sendai

Statistics of Empress's Cup in the 2014 season.

== Overview ==
It was contested by 36 teams, and Nippon TV Beleza won the championship.

== Results ==
=== 1st round ===
- Nojima Stella Kanagawa Sagamihara 3–2 Sakuyo High School
- Naruto Uzushio High School 0–2 Seiwa Gakuen High School
- Shizuoka Sangyo University 1–2 JEF United Chiba U-18
- AS Harima ALBION 3–0 Shimizudaihachi Pleiades
- Sfida Setagaya FC 6–2 Niigata University of Health and Welfare
- Fujieda Junshin High School 5–0 Himeji Dokkyo University
- Hinomoto Gakuen High School 1–3 Ehime FC
- JFA Academy Fukushima 3–0 Fukuoka J. Anclas
- Albirex Niigata U-18 0–6 Tokiwagi Gakuken High School
- Daisho Gakuen High School 5–1 Kamimura Gakuen High School
- Japan Soccer College 0–2 Nippon Sport Science University
- Angeviolet Hiroshima 2–1 Norddea Hokkaido

=== 2nd round ===
- Nojima Stella Kanagawa Sagamihara 3–1 Seiwa Gakuen High School
- JEF United Chiba U-18 0–4 Iga FC Kunoichi
- Urawa Reds Youth 0–0 (pen 3–4) AS Harima ALBION
- Sfida Setagaya FC 0–1 Fujieda Junshin High School
- Ehime FC 3–2 JFA Academy Fukushima
- Tokiwagi Gakuken High School 3–2 Speranza FC Osaka-Takatsuki
- Kibi International University 2–2 (pen 7–8) Angeviolet Hiroshima
- Daisho Gakuen High School 0–1 Nippon Sport Science University

=== 3rd round ===
- Urawa Reds 6–0 Nojima Stella Kanagawa Sagamihara
- Iga FC Kunoichi 3–1 AS Elfen Saitama
- INAC Kobe Leonessa 4–0 AS Harima ALBION
- Fujieda Junshin High School 0–4 JEF United Chiba
- Nippon TV Beleza 9–0 Ehime FC
- Tokiwagi Gakuken High School 0–4 Albirex Niigata
- Vegalta Sendai 5–0 Angeviolet Hiroshima
- Nippon Sport Science University 1–3 Okayama Yunogo Belle

=== Quarterfinals ===
- Urawa Reds 2–0 Iga FC Kunoichi
- INAC Kobe Leonessa 0–1 JEF United Chiba
- Nippon TV Beleza 3–0 Albirex Niigata
- Vegalta Sendai 6–1 Okayama Yunogo Belle

=== Semifinals ===
- Urawa Reds 3–1 JEF United Chiba
- Nippon TV Beleza 2–0 Vegalta Sendai

=== Final ===
- Nippon TV Beleza 1–0 Urawa Reds

Nippon TV Beleza won the championship.
