= 2018 Empress's Cup =

Tournament details
- Country: Japan

Final positions
- Champions: Nippon TV Beleza
- Runners-up: INAC Kobe Leonessa
- Semifinalists: Urawa Reds; JEF United Chiba

Statistics of Empress's Cup in the 2018 season.

== Overview ==
It was contested by 48 teams, and Nippon TV Beleza won the championship.

== Results ==
=== 1st round ===
- JFA Academy Fukushima LSC 1-0 Chifure AS Elfen Saitama
- Otani Muroran High School 1-4 Daito Bunka University
- Nippon TV Menina 5-2 Kibi International University Charme Okayama Takahashi
- Fukuoka J. Anclas 0-3 Waseda University
- Mukogawa Women's University 5-4 Shikoku Gakuin University Kagawa West High School
- Tokiwagi Gakuen High School LSC 3-1 Albirex Niigata U-18
- Kanagawa University 3-2 Ryukyu Deigos
- Norddea Hokkaido 1-3 Bunnys Kyoto SC
- Fujieda Junshin High School 4-0 Sakuyo High School
- Seiwa Gakuen High School 0-4 AS Harima Albion
- Seisen University 0-6 Teikyo Heisei University
- Angeviolet Hiroshima 4-0 Fukui University of Technology Fukui High School
- Sendai University 2-5 Okayama Yunogo Belle
- JEF United Chiba U-18 3-0 Tokoha University Tachibana High School
- Nippon Sport Science University Fields Yokohama Satellite 0-0 (PSO 5-4) Osaka University of Health and Sport Sciences
- NGU Loveledge Nagoya 3-0 Osaka Toin High School

=== 2nd round ===
- Nippon TV Beleza 6-1 JFA Academy Fukushima LSC
- Orca Kamogawa FC 6-1 Daito Bunka University
- Cerezo Osaka Sakai 1-0 Nippon TV Menina
- Mynavi Vegalta Sendai Ladies 2-0 Waseda University
- AC Nagano Parceiro 4-0 Mukogawa Women's University
- Ehime FC 0-1 Tokiwagi Gakuen High School LSC
- Nippatsu Yokohama FC Seagulls 2-1 Kanagawa University
- Urawa Reds 5-1 Bunnys Kyoto SC
- Nojima Stella Kanagawa Sagamihara 3-0 Fujieda Junshin High School
- Sfida Setagaya FC 0-4 AS Harima Albion
- Iga FC Kunoichi 1-2 Teikyo Heisei University
- JEF United Chiba 2-0 Angeviolet Hiroshima
- Albirex Niigata 3-2 Okayama Yunogo Belle
- Nippon Sport Science University Fields Yokohama 1-0 JEF United Chiba U-18
- Shizuoka Sangyo University Iwata Bonita 6-1 Nippon Sport Science University Fields Yokohama Satellite
- INAC Kobe Leonessa 4-0 NGU Loveledge Nagoya

=== 3rd round ===
- Nippon TV Beleza 4-0 Orca Kamogawa FC
- Cerezo Osaka Sakai 0-2 Mynavi Vegalta Sendai Ladies
- AC Nagano Parceiro 1-0 Tokiwagi Gakuen High School LSC
- Nippatsu Yokohama FC Seagulls 0-2 Urawa Reds
- Nojima Stella Kanagawa Sagamihara 3-1 AS Harima Albion
- Teikyo Heisei University 0-1 JEF United Chiba
- Albirex Niigata 3-1 Nippon Sport Science University Fields Yokohama
- Shizuoka Sangyo University Iwata Bonita 0-2 INAC Kobe Leonessa

=== Quarterfinals ===
- Nippon TV Beleza 6-0 Mynavi Vegalta Sendai Ladies
- AC Nagano Parceiro 0-1 Urawa Reds
- Nojima Stella Kanagawa Sagamihara 0-1 JEF United Chiba
- Albirex Niigata 1-2 INAC Kobe Leonessa

=== Semifinals ===
- Nippon TV Beleza 1-0 Urawa Reds
- JEF United Chiba 0-1 INAC Kobe Leonessa

=== Final ===
- Nippon TV Beleza 4-2 INAC Kobe Leonessa

Nippon TV Beleza won the championship.
