= 2020 in Japanese football =

Football in Japan
- Season: 2020

Men's football
- J1 League: Kawasaki Frontale
- J2 League: Tokushima Vortis
- J3 League: Blaublitz Akita
- Japan Football League: Verspah Oita
- Japanese Regional Leagues: Tiamo Hirakata
- Emperor's Cup: Kawasaki Frontale
- J.League Cup: FC Tokyo
- Japanese Super Cup: Vissel Kobe

Women's football
- Nadeshiko Division 1: Urawa Red
- Nadeshiko Division 2: Sfida Setagaya
- Challenge League: JFA Academy
- Empress's Cup: NTV Beleza

This article summarize the Japanese football in the 2020 season.

== Men's football ==
For this season, as a result of the COVID-19 pandemic, there was no relegation in place for the professional J1, J2 and J3 League, with the J1 League expanding to 20 clubs for the 2021 season. The Japan Football League curtailed its season to play only the second half and had no relegation, thus expanding to maximum 18 clubs for the 2021 season.

=== Promotion and relegation ===
Teams relegated from J1 League

- Jubilo Iwata
- Matsumoto Yamaga

Teams promoted to J1 League

- Kashiwa Reysol
- Yokohama FC

Teams relegated from J2 League

- Kagoshima United FC
- FC Gifu

Teams promoted to J2 League

- Giravanz Kitakyushu
- Thespakusatsu Gunma

Teams relegated from J3 League

No relegation to the Japan Football League

Teams promoted to J3 League

- FC Imabari

Teams relegated from Japan Football League

- Ryutsu Keizai Dragons

Teams promoted to Japan Football League

- Iwaki FC
- Kochi United SC

=== J1 League ===
Pos	Team	Pld	W	D	L	GF	GA	GD	Pts	Qualification or relegation
1	Kawasaki Frontale (C)	34	26	5	3	88	31	+57	83	Qualification for AFC Champions League group stage (Note: Since the winners of the 2020 Emperor's Cup, Kawasaki Frontale, qualified for the Champions League group stage, the spot given to the Emperor's Cup winners (Champions League group stage) was passed to the third-placed team and the spot given to the third-place team (Champions League play-off round) was passed to the fourth-placed team.)
2	Gamba Osaka	34	20	5	9	46	42	+4	65	Qualification for AFC Champions League group stage
3	Nagoya Grampus	34	19	6	9	45	28	+17	63	Qualification for AFC Champions League group stage
4	Cerezo Osaka	34	18	6	10	46	37	+9	60	Qualification for AFC Champions League play-off round
5	Kashima Antlers	34	18	5	11	55	44	+11	59	
6	FC Tokyo	34	17	6	11	47	42	+5	57	
7	Kashiwa Reysol	34	15	7	12	60	46	+14	52	
8	Sanfrecce Hiroshima	34	13	9	12	46	37	+9	48	
9	Yokohama F. Marinos	34	14	5	15	69	59	+10	47	
10	Urawa Red Diamonds	34	13	7	14	43	56	−13	46	
11	Oita Trinita	34	11	10	13	36	45	−9	43	
12	Hokkaido Consadole Sapporo	34	10	9	15	47	58	−11	39	
13	Sagan Tosu	34	7	15	12	37	43	−6	36	
14	Vissel Kobe	34	9	9	16	50	59	−9	36	
15	Yokohama FC	34	9	6	19	38	60	−22	33	
16	Shimizu S-Pulse	34	7	7	20	48	70	−22	28	
17	Vegalta Sendai	34	6	10	18	36	61	−25	28	
18	Shonan Bellmare	34	6	9	19	29	48	−19	27	

Source: Meiji Yasuda J1 League
Rules for classification: 1) Points; 2) Goal difference; 3) Head-to-head points; 4) Head-to-head goal difference; 5) Head-to-head goal scored; 6) Number of wins; 7) Goals scored; 8) Fair-play points.
(C) Champions

=== J2 League ===
Pos	Team	Pld	W	D	L	GF	GA	GD	Pts	Promotion, qualification or relegation
1	Tokushima Vortis (C, P)	42	25	9	8	67	33	+34	84	Promotion to 2021 J1 League; 2020 Emperor's Cup quarter-finals
2	Avispa Fukuoka (P)	42	25	9	8	51	29	+22	84	Promotion to 2021 J1 League
3	V-Varen Nagasaki	42	23	11	8	66	39	+27	80	
4	Ventforet Kofu	42	16	17	9	50	41	+9	65	
5	Giravanz Kitakyushu	42	19	8	15	59	51	+8	65	
6	Júbilo Iwata	42	16	15	11	58	47	+11	63	
7	Montedio Yamagata	42	17	11	14	59	42	+17	62	
8	Kyoto Sanga	42	16	11	15	47	45	+2	59	
9	Mito HollyHock	42	16	10	16	68	62	+6	58	
10	Tochigi SC	42	15	13	14	41	39	+2	58	
11	Albirex Niigata	42	14	15	13	55	55	0	57	
12	Tokyo Verdy	42	13	15	14	48	48	0	54	
13	Matsumoto Yamaga	42	13	15	14	44	52	−8	54	
14	JEF United Chiba	42	15	8	19	47	51	−4	53	
15	Omiya Ardija	42	14	11	17	43	52	−9	53	
16	FC Ryukyu	42	14	8	20	58	61	−3	50	
17	Fagiano Okayama	42	12	14	16	39	49	−10	50	
18	Zweigen Kanazawa	42	12	13	17	57	67	−10	49	
19	Machida Zelvia	42	12	13	17	41	52	−11	49	
20	Thespakusatsu Gunma	42	15	4	23	40	62	−22	49	
21	Ehime FC	42	8	10	24	38	68	−30	34	
22	Renofa Yamaguchi	42	9	6	27	43	74	−31	33	

Source: Meiji Yasuda J2 League
Rules for classification: 1) Points; 2) Goal difference; 3) Head-to-head points; 4) Head-to-head goal difference; 5) Head-to-head goal scored; 6) Number of wins; 7) Goals scored; 8) Fair-play points
(C) Champions; (P) Promoted

=== J3 League ===
Pos	Team	Pld	W	D	L	GF	GA	GD	Pts	Promotion
1	Blaublitz Akita (C, P)	34	21	10	3	55	18	+37	73	Promotion to 2021 J2 League; 2020 Emperor's Cup quarter-finals
2	SC Sagamihara (P)	34	16	13	5	43	35	+8	61	Promotion to 2021 J2 League (Note: Only teams that hold a J2 licence are eligible for promotion.)
3	Nagano Parceiro	34	17	8	9	45	26	+19	59	
4	Kagoshima United	34	18	4	12	55	43	+12	58	
5	Gainare Tottori	34	17	6	11	47	37	+10	57	
6	FC Gifu	34	16	8	10	50	39	+11	56	
7	FC Imabari	34	15	10	9	39	27	+12	55	
8	Roasso Kumamoto	34	16	6	12	56	47	+9	54	
9	Kataller Toyama	34	15	5	14	52	43	+9	50	
10	Fujieda MYFC	34	14	7	13	48	44	+4	49	
11	Iwate Grulla Morioka	34	11	9	14	36	47	−11	42	
12	Azul Claro Numazu	34	12	5	17	36	40	−4	41	
13	Fukushima United	34	11	6	17	46	55	−9	39	
14	Gamba Osaka U-23	34	9	8	17	43	55	−12	35	Folded
15	Vanraure Hachinohe	34	8	9	17	42	56	−14	33	
16	Kamatamare Sanuki	34	7	10	17	33	52	−19	31	
17	YSCC Yokohama	34	5	12	17	37	66	−29	27	
18	Cerezo Osaka U-23	34	5	10	19	28	61	−33	25	Folded
19	FC Tokyo U-23	0	0	0	0	0	0	0	0	Withdrew due to the COVID-19 pandemic in Japan

Updated to match(es) played on 20 December 2020. Source: 2020 MEIJI YASUDA J3 LEAGUE League table
Rules for classification: 1) Points; 2) Goal difference; 3) Head-to-head points; 4) Head-to-head goal difference; 5) Head-to-head goal scored; 6) Number of wins; 7) Goals scored; 8) Fair-play points
(C) Champions; (P) Promoted

=== Japan Football League ===
Pos	Team	Pld	W	D	L	GF	GA	GD	Pts	Promotion
1	Verspah Oita (C)	15	10	2	3	27	16	+11	32	
2	**Tegevajaro Miyazaki** (P)	15	8	4	3	26	15	+11	28	Promotion to 2021 J3 League (Note: To qualify for promotion, a club must hold a 100 Year Plan status, obtain J3 license (marked in bold in the table), and finish both in the top 4 of the JFL, and either 1st or 2nd among the promotion-eligible clubs.)
3	Sony Sendai	15	8	2	5	25	22	+3	26	
4	Honda FC	15	5	7	3	20	12	+8	22	
5	Suzuka Point Getters	15	6	3	6	23	19	+4	21	
6	**Veertien Mie**	15	6	3	6	17	16	+1	21	
7	**Iwaki FC**	15	6	3	6	24	24	0	21	
8	**FC Osaka**	15	6	2	7	24	24	0	20	
9	MIO Biwako Shiga	15	6	2	7	23	27	−4	20	
10	Matsue City FC	15	6	2	7	18	24	−6	20	
11	Tokyo Musashino City	15	5	4	6	15	17	−2	19	
12	Honda Lock	15	5	4	6	19	25	−6	19	
13	**Nara Club**	15	5	3	7	21	21	0	18	
14	Kochi United SC	15	4	4	7	17	20	−3	16	
15	**ReinMeer Aomori**	15	4	4	7	17	26	−9	16	
16	Maruyasu Okazaki	15	4	3	8	14	22	−8	15	

Source: JFL website (in Japanese)
Rules for classification: 1) Points; 2) Goal difference; 3) Head-to-head results; 4) Goals scored; 5) Disciplinary points; 6) Number of wins; 7) Lottery
(C) Champions; (P) Promoted

=== National team ===
==== Results ====
9 October 2020 Friendly	**Japan**	**0–0**	**Cameroon**	Utrecht, Netherlands
14:00 UTC+2		Report		Stadium: Stadion Galgenwaard; Referee: Bas Nijhuis (Netherlands)

13 October 2020 Friendly	**Japan**	**1–0**	**Ivory Coast**	Utrecht, Netherlands
16:45 UTC+2	Ueda 90+1'	Report		Stadium: Stadion Galgenwaard; Referee: Jochem Kamphuis (Netherlands)

13 November 2020 Friendly	**Japan**	**1–0**	**Panama**	Graz, Austria
15:15 UTC+1	Minamino 61' (pen.)	Report		Stadium: Liebenauer Stadium; Referee: Christian-Petru Ciochirca (Austria)

17 November 2020 Friendly	**Japan**	**0–2**	**Mexico**	Graz, Austria
21:00 UTC+1		Report	Jiménez 63'; Lozano 68'	Stadium: Liebenauer Stadium; Referee: Manuel Schüttengruber (Austria)

== Women's football ==
=== Promotion and relegation ===
Team(s) relegated from Nadeshiko Division 1

- Ehime

Teams at the Division 1 play-offs

- Iga Kunoichi
- Elfen Saitama

Team(s) promoted to Nadeshiko Division 1

- Sfida Setagaya

Team(s) relegated from Nadeshiko Division 2

- Bunnys Kyoto

Team(s) at the Division 2 play-offs

- Nittaidai

=== Nadeshiko League (Division 1) ===
Pos	Team	Pld	W	D	L	GF	GA	GD	Pts	Qualification or relegation
1	Urawa Reds Ladies	18	14	2	2	37	17	+20	44	Champions, form WE League
2	INAC Kobe Leonessa	18	11	2	5	33	19	+14	35	Form WE League
3	NTV Beleza	18	9	4	5	45	22	+23	31	Form WE League
4	Cerezo Osaka	18	8	6	4	32	36	−4	30	
5	Albirex Niigata	18	8	3	7	19	17	+2	27	Form WE League
6	JEF United Chiba	18	6	5	7	30	29	+1	23	Form WE League
7	Mynavi Vegalta Sendai	18	6	4	8	26	24	+2	22	Form WE League
8	Nojima Stella	18	4	3	11	18	30	−12	15	Form WE League
9	Iga Kunoichi	18	4	2	12	17	33	−16	14	
10	Ehime	18	3	3	12	16	46	−30	12	

Source: Soccerway
Rules for classification: 1) Points; 2) Goal difference; 3) Number of goals scored; 4) Head-to-head points; 5) Head-to-head goal difference; 6) Head-to-head away goals scored

=== Nadeshiko League (Division 2) ===
Pos	Team	Pld	W	D	L	GF	GA	GD	Pts	Promotion or relegation
1	Sfida Setagaya	18	11	4	3	34	18	+16	37	
2	Elfen Saitama	18	11	3	4	33	13	+20	36	Promoted to WE League
3	Kamogawa	18	10	4	4	37	18	+19	34	
4	Yokohama	18	8	8	2	29	8	+21	32	
5	Nagano Parceiro	18	8	4	6	22	13	+9	28	Promoted to WE League
6	Harima	18	8	2	8	25	22	+3	26	
7	Yamato Sylphid	18	7	5	6	15	16	−1	26	
8	Jumonji Ventus	18	3	4	11	15	40	−25	13	Promoted to WE League
9	Nittaidai	18	2	3	13	7	46	−39	9	
10	Bunnys Kyoto	18	1	5	12	8	31	−23	8	

Source: Soccerway

=== National team ===
==== Results ====
5 March 2020 SheBelieves Cup	Japan	1–3	Spain	Orlando, United States
16:15 ET	Iwabuchi 44'	Report	Putellas 8'; García 48', 78'	Stadium: Exploria Stadium; Attendance: 7,528; Referee: Katja Koroleva (United States)

8 March 2020 SheBelieves Cup	Japan	0–1	England	Harrison, United States
14:15 ET		Report	White 84'	Stadium: Red Bull Arena; Attendance: 14,758; Referee: Katja Koroleva (United States)

11 March 2020 SheBelieves Cup	United States	3–1	Japan	Frisco, United States
19:00 CT	Rapinoe 7'; Press 26'; Horan 83'	Report	Iwabuchi 58'	Stadium: Toyota Stadium; Referee: Melissa Borjas (Honduras)

11 April 2020 MS&AD Cup 2020	Japan	Cancelled	New Zealand	Sendai
15:00		Cancellation		Stadium: Yurtec Stadium
