= Shiori Miyake =

Japanese footballer (born 1995)

Shiori Miyake 三宅 史織
Personal information
- Date of birth: 13 October 1995 (age 31)
- Place of birth: Sapporo, Japan
- Height: 1.65 m (5 ft 5 in)
- Position: Defender

Team information
- Current team: INAC Kobe Leonessa
- Number: 5

Youth career
- 2008–2013: JFA Academy Fukushima

Senior career*
Years	Team	Apps	(Gls)
2013–	INAC Kobe Leonessa	89	(4)
Total		89	(4)

International career^{‡}
2012	Japan U-17	3	(0)
2013–	Japan	35	(0)
Medal record
INAC Kobe Leonessa
Winner	Nadeshiko League	2013
Runner-up	Nadeshiko League	2016
Runner-up	Nadeshiko League	2017
Runner-up	Nadeshiko League	2018
Winner	Nadeshiko League Cup	2013
Runner-up	Nadeshiko League Cup	2018
Winner	Empress's Cup	2013
Winner	Empress's Cup	2015
Winner	Empress's Cup	2016
Runner-up	Empress's Cup	2018
Representing Japan
AFC Women's Asian Cup
Gold medal – first place	2018 Jordan
Asian Games
Gold medal – first place	2018 Jakarta-Palembang	Team
AFC U-16 Women's Championship
Gold medal – first place	2011 China
- * Club domestic league appearances and goals as of 31 December 2018 ‡ National team caps and goals as of 27 March 2023

Shiori Miyake (三宅 史織, Miyake Shiori; born 13 October 1995) is a Japanese professional footballer who plays for WE League club INAC Kobe Leonessa and the Japan women's national team.

== Club career ==
Miyake was born in Sapporo on October 13, 1995. After playing JFA Academy Fukushima, she joined INAC Kobe Leonessa in 2013.

== National team career ==
In 2011, Miyake was part of the Japan U-16 team that won the 2011 AFC U-16 Championship. In 2012, she represented Japan U-17 team at the 2012 U-17 World Cup. On September 11, 2013, she received her first senior team call-up. On September 22, she made her debut in a 2–0 win over Nigeria. In 2018, she played at 2018 Asian Cup and Japan won the championship. She played 17 games for Japan.

On 13 June 2023, she was included in Japan's 23-player squad for the FIFA Women's World Cup 2023.

== National team statistics ==
As of 17 April 2018.

Japan national team
Year	Apps	Goals
2013	1	0
2014	0	0
2015	0	0
2016	0	0
2017	5	0
2018	11	0
2019	4	0
2020	3	0
2021	2	0
2022	6	0
2023	3	0
Total	35	0

== Honours ==
=== Club ===
INAC Kobe Leonessa

- Nadeshiko League: 2013
- Empress's Cup: 2015, 2016
- Nadeshiko League Cup: 2013

=== International ===
- AFC U-16 Women's Championship: 2011
