= 2022 Nadeshiko League =

Nadeshiko League Division 1
- Season: 2022
- Dates: 19 March – 16 October 2022
- All statistics correct as of 3 October 2022.

Nadeshiko League Division 2
- Season: 2022
- Dates: 26 March – 9 October 2022
- All statistics correct as of 3 October 2022.

The 2022 Nadeshiko League was the 34th season of the Nadeshiko League, the second or third-tier leagues for women's association football in Japan. It was also the 18th season in its current format.

== Teams ==
=== Division 1 ===
| Team | Location | Ground | Capacity | 2021 season |
|---|---|---|---|---|
| Bunnys Gunma FC White Star | Maebashi | Earth Care Gunma Shikishima Football Stadium | | Div.2 2nd ▲ |
| Orca Kamogawa FC | Chiba | Fukuda Denshi Arena | | 9th |
| Sfida Setagaya FC | Setagaya, Tokyo | Komazawa Olympic Park | | 2nd |
| Nippon Sport Science University Fields Yokohama | Sagamihara | Sagamihara Gion Stadium | | 4th |
| NHK Spring Yokohama FC Seagulls | Saitama | NACK5 Stadium Omiya | | 6th |
| NGU Loveledge Nagoya | Hiroshima | Hiroshima Koiki Park Football Stadium | | 8th |
| Iga Kunoichi | Iga | Ueno Athletic Park | | 1st |
| Speranza Osaka-Takatsuki | Takahashi, Okayama | Ajinomoto Field Nishigaoka | | 10th |
| Cerezo Osaka | Osaka | Kumagaya Athletic Stadium | | 3rd |
| AS Harima Albion | Saitama | Urawa Komaba Stadium | | 7th |
| Ange Violet Hiroshima | Saitama | Urawa Komaba Stadium | | 11th |
| Ehime FC | Matsuyama | Ningineer Stadium | | 5th |

=== Division 2 ===
| Team | Location | Ground | Capacity | 2021 season |
|---|---|---|---|---|
| Norddea Hokkaido | Sapporo, Hokkaido | Nagano U Stadium | | 5th |
| Tsukuba FC Ladies | Tsukuba, Ibaraki | Denka Big Swan Stadium | | 6th |
| Yamato Sylphid | Kumagaya | Kumagaya Athletic Stadium | | Div.1 12nd ▼ |
| JFA Academy Fukushima | Kobe | Noevir Stadium Kobe | | 1st |
| Shizuoka SSU Asregina | Chiba | Fukuda Denshi Arena | | 3rd |
| Veertien Mie Ladies | Sendai | Yurtec Stadium Sendai | | Tōkai Div.1 5th ▲ |
| Okayama Yunogo Belle | Mimasaka, Okayama | Sagamihara Gion Stadium | | 8th |
| Kibi International University Charme Okayama Takahashi | Takahashi, Okayama | NACK5 Stadium Omiya | | 7th |
| Diavorosso Hiroshima | Hiroshima | Hiroshima Koiki Park Football Stadium | | Chūgoku Div.2 1st ▲ |
| Fukuoka J. Anclas | Fukuoka | Ajinomoto Field Nishigaoka | | 4th |

== League table ==
=== Division 1 ===
| Pos | Team | Pld | W | D | L | GF | GA | GD | Pts | Promotion or relegation |
|---|---|---|---|---|---|---|---|---|---|---|
| 1 | Sfida Setagaya FC (C) | 22 | 16 | 2 | 4 | 45 | 16 | +29 | 50 | |
| 2 | Iga Kunoichi | 22 | 14 | 4 | 4 | 37 | 18 | +19 | 46 | |
| 3 | AS Harima Albion | 22 | 13 | 4 | 5 | 46 | 23 | +23 | 43 | |
| 4 | Cerezo Osaka (P) | 22 | 11 | 5 | 6 | 46 | 25 | +21 | 38 | Promoted to 2023–24 WE League |
| 5 | Orca Kamogawa FC | 22 | 11 | 3 | 8 | 26 | 20 | +6 | 36 | |
| 6 | NGU Loveledge Nagoya | 22 | 10 | 6 | 6 | 27 | 24 | +3 | 36 | |
| 7 | Nippon Sport Science University Fields Yokohama | 22 | 9 | 2 | 11 | 19 | 28 | −9 | 29 | |
| 8 | NHK Spring Yokohama FC Seagulls | 22 | 7 | 6 | 9 | 24 | 26 | −2 | 27 | |
| 9 | Bunnys Gunma FC White Star | 22 | 7 | 4 | 11 | 21 | 40 | −19 | 25 | |
| 10 | Speranza Osaka-Takatsuki | 22 | 3 | 7 | 12 | 13 | 34 | −21 | 16 | |
| 11 | Ehime FC Ladies | 22 | 2 | 7 | 13 | 18 | 32 | −14 | 13 | |
| 12 | Ange Violet Hiroshima | 22 | 3 | 2 | 17 | 10 | 46 | −36 | 11 | Disbanding after this season |

Source: Nadeshiko League
Rules for classification: 1) Points; 2) Goal difference; 3) Number of goals scored; 4) Head-to-head points; 5) Head-to-head goal difference; 6) Head-to-head away goals scored
(C) Champions; (P) Promoted

=== Division 2 ===
| Pos | Team | Pld | W | D | L | GF | GA | GD | Pts | Qualification or relegation |
|---|---|---|---|---|---|---|---|---|---|---|
| 1 | Shizuoka SSU Asregina (C, P) | 18 | 13 | 4 | 1 | 37 | 15 | +22 | 43 | Promotion to the 2023 Nadeshiko League Division 1 |
| 2 | JFA Academy Fukushima (Note: After two teams are leaving from Division 1, a promotion-relegation playoff between Divisions 1 and 2 has been cancelled, no team from Division 1 will be relegated, and top two teams from Division 2 will promote to Division 1. However, since the second-placed team (JFA Academy Fukushima) is not eligible for promoting to Division 1, the third-placed team (Yamato Sylphid) is to promote to Division 1 instead.) | 18 | 12 | 5 | 1 | 47 | 17 | +30 | 41 | |
| 3 | Yamato Sylphid (P) | 18 | 10 | 5 | 3 | 37 | 20 | +17 | 35 | Promotion to the 2023 Nadeshiko League Division 1 |
| 4 | Diavorosso Hiroshima | 18 | 7 | 6 | 5 | 24 | 18 | +6 | 27 | |
| 5 | Kibi International University Charme Okayama Takahashi | 18 | 4 | 6 | 8 | 13 | 22 | −9 | 18 | |
| 6 | Fukuoka J. Anclas | 18 | 4 | 6 | 8 | 14 | 29 | −15 | 18 | |
| 7 | Norddea Hokkaido | 18 | 3 | 7 | 8 | 16 | 28 | −12 | 16 | |
| 8 | Tsukuba FC Ladies | 18 | 2 | 8 | 8 | 12 | 28 | −16 | 14 | |
| 9 | Veertien Mie Ladies | 18 | 2 | 7 | 9 | 14 | 21 | −7 | 13 | |
| 10 | Okayama Yunogo Belle (O) | 18 | 1 | 10 | 7 | 14 | 30 | −16 | 13 | Qualification for the promotion relegation play-offs |

Source: Nadeshiko League
Rules for classification: 1) Points; 2) Goal difference; 3) Number of goals scored; 4) Head-to-head points; 5) Head-to-head goal difference; 6) Head-to-head away goals scored
(C) Champions; (O) Play-off winners; (P) Promoted

==== Division 2 promotion-relegation play-offs ====
The top three teams from regional league qualifiers (1st: FC Fujizakura Yamanashi, 2nd: Diosa Izumo FC, 3rd: Viamaterras Miyazaki) and the lowest-ranked team from Division 2 (Okayama Yunogo Belle) played a round-robin tournament. The top three teams of the round-robin were to join Division 2 next year.

| Pos | Team | Pld | W | D | L | GF | GA | GD | Pts | Qualification or relegation |
|---|---|---|---|---|---|---|---|---|---|---|
| 1 | Viamaterras Miyazaki (P) | 3 | 3 | 0 | 0 | 11 | 1 | +10 | 9 | Promotion to 2023 Nadeshiko League Division 2 |
| 2 | FC Fujizakura Yamanashi (P) | 3 | 2 | 0 | 1 | 4 | 4 | 0 | 6 | Promotion to 2023 Nadeshiko League Division 2 |
| 3 | Okayama Yunogo Belle | 3 | 1 | 0 | 2 | 5 | 11 | −6 | 3 | Remained in Nadeshiko League Division 2 |
| 4 | Diosa Izumo FC | 3 | 0 | 0 | 3 | 3 | 7 | −4 | 0 | |

Source: Nadeshiko League (in Japanese)
Rules for classification: 1) Points; 2) Head-to-head points; 3) Head-to-head goal difference; 4) Head-to-head goals scored; 5) Goal difference; 6) Number of goals scored; 7) Disciplinary points for yellow and red cards
(P) Promoted

== Top scorers ==
=== Division 1 ===
As of 11 October 2022.

| Rank | Player | Club | Goals |
|---|---|---|---|
| 1 | (Japan) Sonoko Chiba (千葉 園子) | AS Harima Albion | 14 |
| 2 | (Japan) Mayu Otake (大竹 麻友) | Sfida Setagaya FC | 13 |
| 3 | (Japan) Niina Yamada (山田 仁衣奈) | NGU Loveledge Nagoya | 10 |
| 3 | (Japan) Sinomi Koyama (小山 史乃観) | Cerezo Osaka Sakai Ladies | 10 |
| 5 | (Japan) Mao Murakami (村上 真生) | Sfida Setagaya FC | 8 |
| 5 | (Japan) Fumina Katsurama (葛馬 史奈) | AS Harima Albion | 8 |
| 5 | (Japan) Sari Kaneshige (兼重 紗里) | Orca Kamogawa FC | 8 |
| 8 | (Japan) Kanami Sinbori (新堀 華波) | AS Harima Albion | 7 |
| 8 | (Japan) Asuka Mitsuhashi (三橋 明香) | Iga FC Kunoichi Mie | 7 |
| 10 | (Japan) Miyuka Momono (百濃 実結香) | Cerezo Osaka Sakai Ladies | 6 |

=== Division 2 ===
As of 9 October 2022.

| Rank | Player | Club | Goals |
|---|---|---|---|
| 1 | (Japan) Mao Itamura (板村 真央) | JFA Academy Fukushima | 13 |
| 1 | (Japan) Marin Hamamoto (濱本 まりん) | Yamato Sylphid | 13 |
| 3 | (Japan) Eriko Adachi (足立 英梨子) | Diavorosso Hiroshima | 9 |
| 4 | (Japan) Momoko Tanikawa (谷川 萌々子) | JFA Academy Fukushima | 8 |
| 5 | (Japan) Rika Kojima (幸嶋 里佳) | Yamato Sylphid | 7 |
| 6 | (Japan) Hibari Hara (原 ひばり) | JFA Academy Fukushima | 6 |
| 6 | (Japan) Arisa Nakamura (中村 有沙) | Okayama Yunogo Belle | 6 |
| 8 | (Japan) Yukiko Sue (須恵 裕貴子) | Yamato Sylphid | 5 |
| 8 | (Japan) Manaka Matsukubo (松窪 真心) | JFA Academy Fukushima | 5 |
| 8 | (Japan) Yuzuki Tsuchiya (土屋 佑津季) | Shizuoka SSU Asregina | 5 |
| 8 | (Japan) Mizuki Akamine (赤嶺 美月) | Diavorosso Hiroshima | 5 |

== See also ==
- Japan Football Association (JFA)
- 2022 in Japanese football
- 2021–22 WE League season
