= 2016 Empress's Cup =

Tournament details
- Country: Japan

Final positions
- Champions: INAC Kobe Leonessa
- Runners-up: Albirex Niigata
- Semifinalists: Nippon TV Beleza; Vegalta Sendai

Statistics of Empress's Cup in the 2016 season.

== Overview ==
It was contested by 48 teams, and INAC Kobe Leonessa won the championship.

== Results ==
=== 1st round ===
- Hiroshima Bunkyo Women's University High School 0-3 Clubfields Linda
- Fujieda Junshin High School 1-2 Sendai University
- Tokuyama University 0-5 Nippatsu Yokohama FC Seagulls
- JFA Academy Fukushima 8-1 Shikoku Gakuin University
- NGU Nagoya FC 0-2 Orca Kamogawa FC
- Norddea Hokkaido 1-4 Hinomoto Gakuen High School
- Shizuoka Sangyo University 1-0 Urawa Reds Youth
- AS Harima ALBION 4-1 Nippon TV Menina
- Kamimura Gakuen High School 3-2 Seiwa Gakuen High School
- Cerezo Osaka Sakai 3-1 Fukui University of Technology Fukui High School
- Fukuoka J. Anclas 0-5 Waseda University
- Bunnys Kyoto SC 1-0 University of Tsukuba
- Toyo University 3-0 Japan Soccer College
- Mashiki Renaissance Kumamoto FC 3-2 Tokoha University Tachibana High School
- Tokyo International University 1-0 Angeviolet Hiroshima
- Daisho Gakuen High School 1-0 Niigata University of Health and Welfare

=== 2nd round ===
- Nippon TV Beleza 12-0 Clubfields Linda
- Ehime FC 5-0 Sendai University
- Konomiya Speranza Osaka-Takatsuki 1-3 Nippatsu Yokohama FC Seagulls
- JEF United Chiba 4-0 JFA Academy Fukushima
- Albirex Niigata 4-1 Orca Kamogawa FC
- Chifure AS Elfen Saitama 3-1 Hinomoto Gakuen High School
- Nippon Sport Science University 5-0 Shizuoka Sangyo University
- AC Nagano Parceiro 5-1 AS Harima ALBION
- Vegalta Sendai 7-0 Kamimura Gakuen High School
- Sfida Setagaya FC 3-0 Cerezo Osaka Sakai
- Nojima Stella Kanagawa Sagamihara 3-2 Waseda University
- Okayama Yunogo Belle 1-0 Bunnys Kyoto SC
- Iga FC Kunoichi 4-0 Toyo University
- Urawa Reds 6-0 Mashiki Renaissance Kumamoto FC
- Kibi International University 2-2 (pen 5-4) Tokyo International University
- INAC Kobe Leonessa 1-0 Daisho Gakuen High School

=== 3rd round ===
- Nippon TV Beleza 8-1 Ehime FC
- Nippatsu Yokohama FC Seagulls 1-2 JEF United Chiba
- Albirex Niigata 1-0 Chifure AS Elfen Saitama
- Nippon Sport Science University 1-2 AC Nagano Parceiro
- Vegalta Sendai 5-1 Sfida Setagaya FC
- Nojima Stella Kanagawa Sagamihara 3-1 Okayama Yunogo Belle
- Iga FC Kunoichi 0-2 Urawa Reds
- Kibi International University 0-3 INAC Kobe Leonessa

=== Quarterfinals ===
- Nippon TV Beleza 1-0 JEF United Chiba
- Albirex Niigata 2-0 AC Nagano Parceiro
- Vegalta Sendai 2-0 Nojima Stella Kanagawa Sagamihara
- Urawa Reds 0-1 INAC Kobe Leonessa

=== Semifinals ===
- Nippon TV Beleza 0-1 Albirex Niigata
- Vegalta Sendai 1-3 INAC Kobe Leonessa

=== Final ===
- INAC Kobe Leonessa 0-0 (pen 5-4) Albirex Niigata

INAC Kobe Leonessa won the championship.
