= Rika Masuya =

Japanese footballer (born 1995)

Rika Masuya 増矢 理花
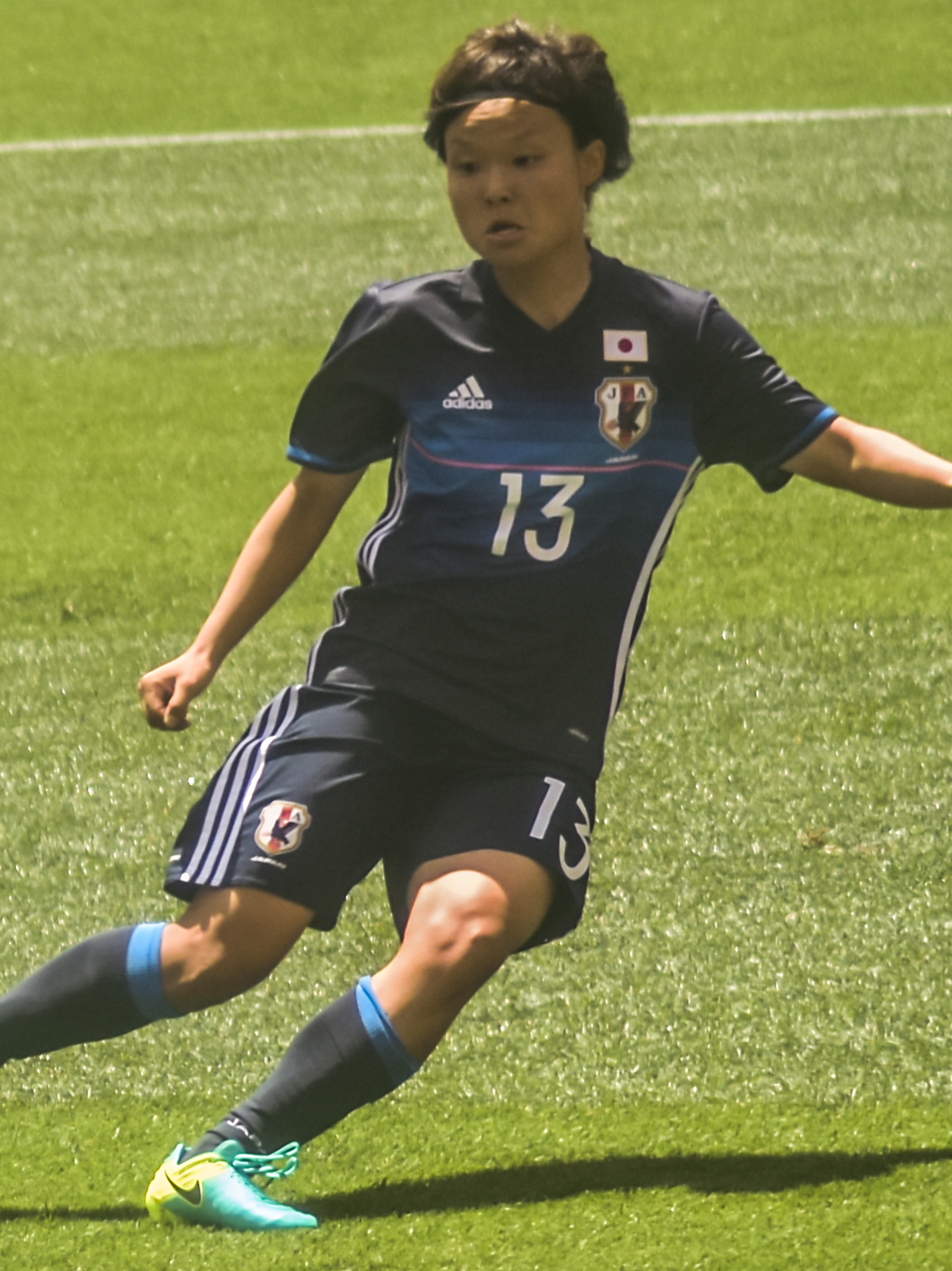
- Masuya playing in 2016

Personal information
- Full name: Rika Masuya
- Date of birth: September 14, 1995 (age 31)
- Place of birth: Matsushige, Tokushima, Japan
- Height: 1.60 m (5 ft 3 in)
- Position: Forward

Youth career
- 2008–2013: JFA Academy Fukushima

Senior career*
Years	Team	Apps	(Gls)
2014–2020	INAC Kobe Leonessa	133	(27)
2021–2023	Sanfrecce Hiroshima Regina	17	(2)
2023–2024	INAC Kobe Leonessa	3	(0)
Total		153	(29)

International career
2012	Japan U-17	3	(2)
2014–2018	Japan	27	(6)
Medal record
INAC Kobe Leonessa
Runner-up	Nadeshiko League	2016
Runner-up	Nadeshiko League	2017
Runner-up	Nadeshiko League	2018
Runner-up	Nadeshiko League Cup	2018
Winner	Empress's Cup	2015
Winner	Empress's Cup	2016
Runner-up	Empress's Cup	2018
Representing Japan
AFC Women's Asian Cup
Gold medal – first place	2018 Jordan
Asian Games
Gold medal – first place	2018 Jakarta-Palembang	Team
Silver medal – second place	2014 Incheon	Team
AFC U-16 Women's Championship
Gold medal – first place	2011 China
- * Club domestic league appearances and goals as of December 23 November 2022 (UTC)

Rika Masuya (増矢 理花, Masuya Rika; born September 14, 1995) is a Japanese former professional footballer who played as a forward. She played for the Japan national team.

== Club career ==
Masuya was born in Matsushige, Tokushima on September 14, 1995. After graduating from JFA Academy Fukushima, she joined INAC Kobe Leonessa in 2014.

== National team career ==
In September 2012, Masuya was selected for the Japan U-17 national team for 2012 U-17 World Cup. On September 13, 2014, when she was 18 years old, she debuted for Japan national team against Ghana. She played for Japan at 2014 Asian Games. She played 6 games and scored 2 goals. Japan won 2nd place. In 2018, she played at 2018 Asian Cup and Japan won the championship. She played 27 games and scored 6 goals for Japan until 2018.

== National team statistics ==
Japan national team
Year	Apps	Goals
2014	7	2
2015	3	1
2016	3	0
2017	2	0
2018	12	3
Total	27	6

== International goals ==
No.	Date	Venue	Opponent	Score	Result	Competition
1.	26 September 2014	Hwaseong Stadium, Hwaseong, South Korea	Hong Kong	1–0	9–0	2014 Asian Games
2.	26 September 2014	Hwaseong Stadium, Hwaseong, South Korea	Hong Kong	4–0	9–0	2014 Asian Games
3.	1 August 2015	Wuhan Sports Center Stadium, Wuhan, China	North Korea	2–2	2–4	2015 EAFF Women's East Asian Cup
4.	1 April 2018	Transcosmos Stadium Nagasaki, Isahaya, Japan	Ghana	3–1	7–1	Friendly
5.	29 July 2018	Pratt & Whitney Stadium, East Hartford, United States	Brazil	1–2	1–2	2018 Tournament of Nations
6.	21 August 2018	Gelora Sriwijaya Stadium, Palembang, Indonesia	Vietnam	5–0	7–0	2018 Asian Games
