= Mai Kyokawa =

Japanese footballer

Mai Kyokawa 京川 舞
Personal information
- Full name: Mai Kyokawa
- Date of birth: December 28, 1993 (age 32)
- Place of birth: Omitama, Ibaraki, Japan
- Height: 1.62 m (5 ft 4 in)
- Position: Forward

Team information
- Current team: 1. FFC Turbine Potsdam
- Number: 7

Youth career
- 2009–2011: Tokiwagi Gakuen High School LSC

Senior career*
Years	Team	Apps	(Gls)
2012–2022	INAC Kobe Leonessa	88	(35)
2022–2023	1. FFC Turbine Potsdam	19	(1)
2024-	Gyeongju KHNP		

International career
2010	Japan U-17	6	(3)
2012–2015	Japan	5	(0)
Medal record
INAC Kobe Leonessa
Winner	Nadeshiko League	2012
Winner	Nadeshiko League	2013
Runner-up	Nadeshiko League	2016
Runner-up	Nadeshiko League	2017
Runner-up	Nadeshiko League	2018
Winner	Nadeshiko League Cup	2013
Runner-up	Nadeshiko League Cup	2012
Runner-up	Nadeshiko League Cup	2018
Winner	Empress's Cup	2012
Winner	Empress's Cup	2013
Winner	Empress's Cup	2015
Winner	Empress's Cup	2016
Runner-up	Empress's Cup	2018
Representing Japan
AFC U-19 Women's Championship
Gold medal – first place	2011 Vietnam
FIFA U-17 Women's World Cup
Silver medal – second place	2010 Trinidad and Tobago
AFC U-16 Women's Championship
Bronze medal – third place	2009 Thailand
- * Club domestic league appearances and goals as of 18 August 2024

Mai Kyokawa (京川 舞, Kyokawa Mai; born December 28, 1993) is a Japanese footballer who plays as forward. She plays for 1. FFC Turbine Potsdam in the German Frauen Bundesliga. She has played for the Japan national team.

== Club career ==
Kyokawa was born in Omitama on December 28, 1993. After graduating from high school, she joined INAC Kobe Leonessa in 2012.

== National team career ==
In 2010, Kyokawa was selected by the Japan U-17 national team for the 2010 U-17 World Cup. She played six games and scored three goals, helping Japan to a second-place finish. In February 2012, when she was 18 years old, she was selected by the Japan national team for the 2012 Algarve Cup. At that competition on February 29, she debuted against Norway. She played five games for Japan until 2015.

== National team statistics ==
Japan national team
Year	Apps	Goals
2012	2	0
2013	0	0
2014	0	0
2015	3	0
Total	5	0
