= 2015 Empress's Cup =

Tournament details
- Country: Japan

Final positions
- Champions: INAC Kobe Leonessa
- Runners-up: Albirex Niigata
- Semifinalists: Nippon TV Beleza; Vegalta Sendai

Statistics of Empress's Cup in the 2015 season.

== Overview ==
It was contested by 48 teams, and INAC Kobe Leonessa won the championship.

== Results ==
=== 1st round ===
- Diosa Izumo FC 0-4 Fujieda Junshin High School
- Waseda University 1-0 Fukuoka J. Anclas
- Niigata University of Health and Welfare 1-2 NGU Nagoya FC
- Kanto Gakuen University 0-5 Osaka University of Health and Sport Sciences
- Urawa Reds Youth 0-0 (pen 5-4) JFA Academy Fukushima
- Chinzei Gakuin High School 2-3 Nippon TV Menina
- Kamimura Gakuen High School 3-0 Clubfields Linda
- Sfida Setagaya FC 9-0 Seiwa Gakuen High School
- Japan Soccer College 1-0 Tokoha University Tachibana High School
- Daito Bunka University 2-0 Norddea Hokkaido
- Tokiwagi Gakuken High School 0-1 Yokohama FC Seagulls
- Shizuoka Sangyo University 8-0 Ryukyu Deigos
- Shikoku University 0-5 Yamato Sylphid
- Kaishi Gakuen Japan Soccer College 0-4 Kibi International University
- Hinomoto Gakuen High School 4-3 Tokuyama University
- University of Tsukuba 1-1 (pen 3-4) Bunnys Kyoto SC

=== 2nd round ===
- Nippon TV Beleza 3-1 Fujieda Junshin High School
- AS Harima ALBION 2-2 (pen 0-3) Waseda University
- Speranza FC Osaka-Takatsuki 6-0 NGU Nagoya FC
- Iga FC Kunoichi 3-0 Osaka University of Health and Sport Sciences
- Albirex Niigata 5-0 Urawa Reds Youth
- Nojima Stella Kanagawa Sagamihara 3-1 Nippon TV Menina
- Nippon Sport Science University 5-1 Kamimura Gakuen High School
- JEF United Chiba 1-0 Sfida Setagaya FC
- Vegalta Sendai 3-0 Japan Soccer College
- Ehime FC 2-3 Daito Bunka University
- Urawa Reds 5-0 Yokohama FC Seagulls
- AC Nagano Parceiro 6-1 Shizuoka Sangyo University
- Okayama Yunogo Belle 3-1 Yamato Sylphid
- AS Elfen Saitama 2-0 Kibi International University
- Angeviolet Hiroshima 2-1 Hinomoto Gakuen High School
- INAC Kobe Leonessa 4-0 Bunnys Kyoto SC

=== 3rd round ===
- Nippon TV Beleza 5-0 Waseda University
- Speranza FC Osaka-Takatsuki 1-2 Iga FC Kunoichi
- Albirex Niigata 2-1 Nojima Stella Kanagawa Sagamihara
- Nippon Sport Science University 0-2 JEF United Chiba
- Vegalta Sendai 4-1 Daito Bunka University
- Urawa Reds 2-0 AC Nagano Parceiro
- Okayama Yunogo Belle 2-6 AS Elfen Saitama
- Angeviolet Hiroshima 0-5 INAC Kobe Leonessa

=== Quarterfinals ===
- Nippon TV Beleza 4-1 Iga FC Kunoichi
- Albirex Niigata 2-0 JEF United Chiba
- Vegalta Sendai 0-0 (pen 5-3) Urawa Reds
- AS Elfen Saitama 0-2 INAC Kobe Leonessa

=== Semifinals ===
- Nippon TV Beleza 1-1 (pen 2-3) Albirex Niigata
- Vegalta Sendai 0-2 INAC Kobe Leonessa

=== Final ===
- INAC Kobe Leonessa 1-0 Albirex Niigata

INAC Kobe Leonessa won the championship.
