= Ayumi Kaihori =

Japanese footballer (born 1986)

Ayumi Kaihori 海堀 あゆみ
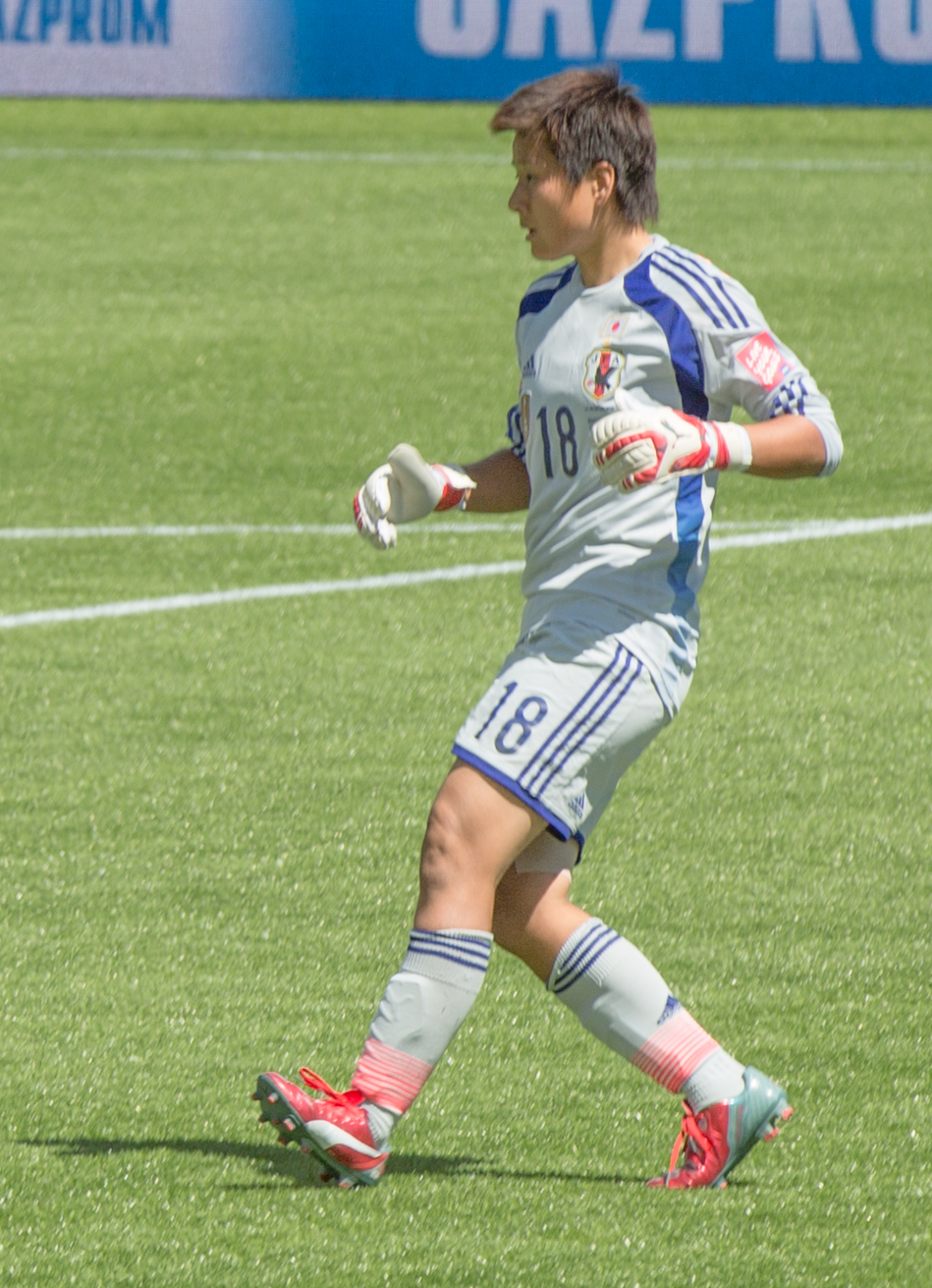
- Kaihori at the 2015 World Cup

Personal information
- Full name: Ayumi Kaihori
- Date of birth: September 4, 1986 (age 40)
- Place of birth: Nagaokakyo, Kyoto, Japan
- Height: 1.70 m (5 ft 7 in)
- Position: Goalkeeper

Youth career
- Speranza FC Takatsuki

Senior career*
| Years | Team | Apps | (Gls) |
| 2004–2007 | Speranza FC Takatsuki | 58 | (0) |
| 2008–2015 | INAC Kobe Leonessa | 157 | (0) |
| Total | | 215 | (0) |

International career
| 2008–2015 | Japan | 53 | (0) |
Medal record
INAC Kobe Leonessa
| Winner | Nadeshiko League | 2011 |
| Winner | Nadeshiko League | 2012 |
| Winner | Nadeshiko League | 2013 |
| Runner-up | Nadeshiko League | 2008 |
| Winner | Nadeshiko League Cup | 2013 |
| Runner-up | Nadeshiko League Cup | 2012 |
| Winner | Empress's Cup | 2010 |
| Winner | Empress's Cup | 2011 |
| Winner | Empress's Cup | 2012 |
| Winner | Empress's Cup | 2013 |
| Winner | Empress's Cup | 2015 |
| Runner-up | Empress's Cup | 2008 |
Representing Japan
Olympic Games
| Silver medal – second place | 2012 London | Team |
FIFA Women's World Cup
| Gold medal – first place | 2011 Germany |
| Silver medal – second place | 2015 Canada |
AFC Women's Asian Cup
| Gold medal – first place | 2014 Vietnam |
| Bronze medal – third place | 2008 Vietnam |
| Bronze medal – third place | 2010 China |
Asian Games
| Gold medal – first place | 2010 Guangzhou | Team |
| Silver medal – second place | 2014 Incheon | Team |
- * Club domestic league appearances and goals

Ayumi Kaihori (海堀 あゆみ, Kaihori Ayumi; born September 4, 1986) is a former Japanese footballer who played as a goalkeeper. She played for the Japan national team.

== Club career ==
Kaihori was born in Nagaokakyo on September 4, 1986. In 2004, she was a high school student and joined the youth team for the Speranza FC Takatsuki. She moved to INAC Leonessa (later INAC Kobe Leonessa) in 2008. The club won the L.League championship three years in a row (2011-2013). She was also selected one of the Best Eleven twice, in 2011 and 2013. She retired in 2015.

== National team career ==
In May 2008, Kaihori was selected by the Japan national team for the 2008 AFC Women's Asian Cup. At this competition, on May 31, she debuted against Chinese Taipei. She was Japan's goalkeeper in the 2011 World Cup final, where she saved two penalties from Shannon Boxx and Tobin Heath in the shoot-out. Japan defeated the United States, 3–1. She was part of the Japanese team that finished second and earned the silver medal at the 2012 Summer Olympics, playing in one game, vs South Africa, which saw Kaihori keep a clean sheet. She also played five matches at the 2015 World Cup and Japan advanced to the final. But lost 5–2 to the United States and finished in second place. She played 53 games for Japan until 2015.

== National team statistics ==
Japan national team
| Year | Apps | Goals |
|---|---|---|
| 2008 | 3 | 0 |
| 2009 | 3 | 0 |
| 2010 | 7 | 0 |
| 2011 | 14 | 0 |
| 2012 | 7 | 0 |
| 2013 | 6 | 0 |
| 2014 | 6 | 0 |
| 2015 | 7 | 0 |
| Total | 53 | 0 |
