= Niigata University of Health and Welfare LSC =

Niigata University of Health and Welfare L.S.C. 新潟医療福祉大学女子サッカー部
- Full name: Niigata University of Health and Welfare L.S.C.
- Founded: 2012
- Manager: Takayuki Akiyama
- League: Challenge.League
- Website: http://www.nuhw.ac.jp/sport/wsoccer/

Niigata University of Health and Welfare L.S.C. (新潟医療福祉大学女子サッカー部) is a women's football club playing in Japan's football league, Hokushinetsu League. Its hometown is the city of Niigata.

== Squad ==
=== Current squad ===
As of 14 July 2020. Note: Flags indicate national team as defined under FIFA eligibility rules; some limited exceptions apply. Players may hold more than one non-FIFA nationality.

No.	Pos.	Nation	Player
1	GK	(Japan) JPN	Natsumi Sato
2	DF	(Japan) JPN	Manami Meguro
3	DF	(Japan) JPN	Chinatsu Hiki
4	MF	(Japan) JPN	Yui Imai
5	DF	(Japan) JPN	Asuka Sugawara
6	DF	(Japan) JPN	Yuka Kikuchi
7	MF	(Japan) JPN	Sorami Kai
8	MF	(Japan) JPN	Ayumi Sekine
9	MF	(Japan) JPN	Yuki Yoshinaga
10	FW	(Japan) JPN	Miyuki Takahashi
11	FW	(Japan) JPN	Miki Fukazawa
12	DF	(Japan) JPN	Mai Ogawa
13	FW	(Japan) JPN	Naho Ohtomo
14	DF	(Japan) JPN	Yumeno Goto
15	MF	(Japan) JPN	Ami Takahashi
16	MF	(Japan) JPN	Monoka Ito

No.	Pos.	Nation	Player
17	MF	(Japan) JPN	Saori Abe
18	MF	(Japan) JPN	Watako Takahashi
19	MF	(Japan) JPN	Arisu Yamazato
20	MF	(Japan) JPN	Rurika Yamatani
21	GK	(Japan) JPN	Airi Kodaka
22	DF	(Japan) JPN	Marina Sato
23	MF	(Japan) JPN	Sonoka Matsumoto
24	DF	(Japan) JPN	Homi Tsunematsu
25	DF	(Japan) JPN	Natsuki Nagasawa
26	MF	(Japan) JPN	Kanami Nakamatsu
27	MF	(Japan) JPN	Ayane Mori
28	MF	(Japan) JPN	Fuki Kinoshita
30	FW	(Japan) JPN	Sari Kaneshige
32	MF	(Japan) JPN	Kou Yamatani
33	DF	(Japan) JPN	Ayaka Furuse

== Results ==
Season	Domestic League				National Cup	League Cup	League Note
Season	League	Level	Place	Tms.	National Cup	League Cup	League Note
2012	Niigata	4	1st	6	1st Stage	–	
2013	Hokushinetsu(pre)	3	1st	6	DNQ	–	
2014	Hokushinetsu	3	1st	7	1st Stage	–	Promoted for L.League
2015	Challenge(East)	3	3rd	6	1st Stage	–	
2016	Challenge	3	9th	12	1st Stage	–	West : 6th
2017	Challenge	3	8th	12	2nd Stage	–	East : 4th
