= Japan Soccer College Ladies =

- Full name: Japan Soccer College Ladies
- Founded: 2008
- Ground: Seirō, Niigata, Japan

Japan Soccer College Ladies (JAPANサッカーカレッジレディース) is a Japanese women's football team which played Japan Women's Football League from 2012 to 2016.

== See also ==
- List of women's football clubs in Japan
