= Kibi International University Charme Okayama Takahashi =

Kibi International University Charme Okayama Takahashi 吉備国際大学Charme岡山高梁
- Full name: Kibi International University Charme Okayama Takahashi
- Nickname(s): Kibi Charme
- Founded: 2000
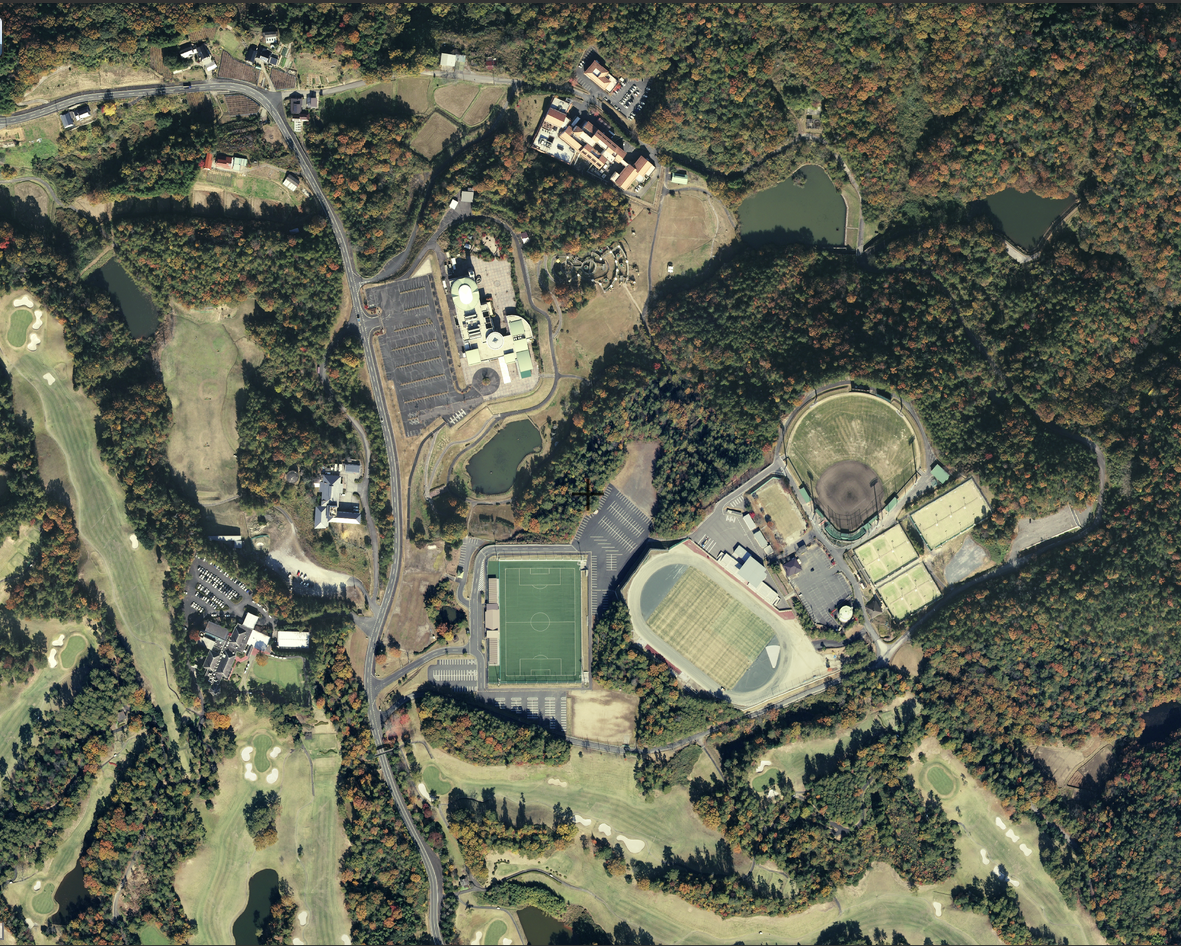
- Ground: City Light Stadium
- Capacity: 5,898
- Manager: Shinji Ota
- League: Nadeshiko League Div.2
- 2022: Nadeshiko League Div.2, 5th of 10
- Website: http://www.charmefc.jp/
Home colours	Away colours

Kibi International University Charme Okayama Takahashi (吉備国際大学Charme岡山高梁) is a women's football club playing in Japan's football league, Challenge League. Its hometown is the city of Takahashi.

== Squad ==
=== Current squad ===
As of April. 15, 2018 Note: Flags indicate national team as defined under FIFA eligibility rules; some limited exceptions apply. Players may hold more than one non-FIFA nationality.

No.	Pos.	Nation	Player
1	GK	(Japan) JPN	Suzuka Fujita
2	DF	(Japan) JPN	Satsuki Mukai
3	DF	(Japan) JPN	Momoko Nagano
4	DF	(Japan) JPN	Asuka Miyaji
5	DF	(Japan) JPN	Rui Kadota
6	MF	(Japan) JPN	Manami Yoshitake
7	FW	(Japan) JPN	Shiho Kurakazu
8	DF	(Japan) JPN	Fumika Noma
9	MF	(Japan) JPN	Mina Komatsu
10	FW	(Japan) JPN	Marin Hamamoto
13	FW	(Japan) JPN	Misaki Kambara
14	MF	(Japan) JPN	Nagisa Yoshida
15	MF	(Japan) JPN	Ayane Takatsuka
16	MF	(Japan) JPN	Sena Mamyo
17	MF	(Japan) JPN	Mitsuyo Tajima
18	FW	(Japan) JPN	Misako Oka
19	FW	(Japan) JPN	Eriko Goya
20	DF	(Japan) JPN	Mika Eguchi
21	GK	(Japan) JPN	Aoi Sakamoto
22	DF	(Japan) JPN	Sakura Asai
23	MF	(Japan) JPN	Rei Tachibana
24	MF	(Japan) JPN	Mami Tachibana
25	DF	(Japan) JPN	Natsuki Yoda
26	MF	(Japan) JPN	Mayu Sekiguchi
27	FW	(Japan) JPN	Mayu Yoshida

No.	Pos.	Nation	Player
28	FW	(Japan) JPN	Momoko Hemmi
29	DF	(Japan) JPN	Asumi Amano
30	DF	(Japan) JPN	Yukino Nishizono
31	GK	(Japan) JPN	Haruka Nakagawa
32	FW	(Japan) JPN	Azuki Oba
33	DF	(Japan) JPN	Yuri Akatsu
34	MF	(Japan) JPN	Sae Hirose
35	FW	(Japan) JPN	Mana Tomochika
36	FW	(Japan) JPN	Nanoka Iriguchi
37	FW	(Japan) JPN	Nanase Fujie
38	MF	(Japan) JPN	Shino Kondo
39	MF	(Japan) JPN	Yuki Koreeda
40	DF	(Japan) JPN	Riku Kayano
41	GK	(Japan) JPN	Rimi Komatsu
42	MF	(Japan) JPN	Yumi Ishimura
43	MF	(Japan) JPN	Amika Kawai
44	FW	(Japan) JPN	Yui Yoshinaga
45	DF	(Japan) JPN	Suzuka Ishikawa
46	DF	(Japan) JPN	Yumi Koyama
47	MF	(Japan) JPN	Misuzu Sakai
48	MF	(Japan) JPN	Hotaru Ura
49	MF	(Japan) JPN	Yuka Sasaki
50	MF	(Japan) JPN	Mai Ueda
51	DF	(Japan) JPN	Hazuki Inoue
52	MF	(Japan) JPN	Kotone Kobayashi
53	DF	(Japan) JPN	Mako Hashimoto

== Results ==
Season	Domestic League				National Cup	League Cup
Season	League	Level	Place	Tms.	National Cup	League Cup
2001	Okayama	3			DNQ	-
2002	Chugoku	2	3rd	8	DNQ	-
2003	Chugoku	2	1st	8	1st Stage	-
2004	Chugoku	3	2nd	8	DNQ	-
2005	Chugoku	3	1st	8	2nd Stage	-
2006	Chugoku	3	1st	8	3rd Stage	-
2007	Chugoku	3	1st	10	3rd Stage	-
2008	Chugoku	3	1st	10	2nd Stage	-
2009	Chugoku	3	1st	10	2nd Stage	-
2010	Chugoku	3	1st	10	3rd Stage	-
2011	Challenge(West)	2	1st	6	3rd Stage	-
2012	Challenge	2	2nd	12	2nd Stage	-
2013	Nadeshiko	1	9th	10	Quarterfinals	Group Stage
2014	Nadeshiko	1	10th	10	2nd Stage	-
2015	Nadeshiko Div.2	2	8th	10	2nd Stage	-
2016	Nadeshiko Div.2	2	9th	10	3rd Stage	Group Stage / Div.2
2017	Nadeshiko Div.2	2	9th	10	1st Stage	Group Stage / Div.2
2018						
2019						
2020						
2021						
2022						
2023						

== Transition of team name ==
- Kibi International University LSC : 2000 - 2010
- FC Takahashi Kibi International University Charme : 2011 – 2012
- FC Kibi International University Charme : 2013 – 2017
- Kibi International University Charme Okayama Takahashi : 2018 – Present
