= Yamato Sylphid =

Yamato Sylphid 大和シルフィード
- Full name: Yamato Sylphid
- Nickname: Sylphid
- Founded: 1998
- Ground: Hodogaya Soccer Field
- Capacity: 2,000
- Manager: Miyuki Sato
- League: Nadeshiko League Div. 1
- 2022: Nadeshiko League Div. 2, 3rd (promoted)
- Website: http://www.yamato-sylphid.com/

Yamato Sylphid (大和シルフィード, Yamato Shirufīdo) is a women's football club based in Yamato, Kanagawa. They currently play in Nadeshiko League, Japan's second tier of women's league football.

== Squad ==
=== Current squad ===
As of 15 January 2023.

Note: Flags indicate national team as defined under FIFA eligibility rules; some limited exceptions apply. Players may hold more than one non-FIFA nationality.

| No. | Pos. | Nation | Player |
|---|---|---|---|
| 1 | GK | JPN | Mayu Mizuguchi |
| 2 | DF | JPN | Miku Shirai |
| 3 | DF | JPN | Mizuki Fujiwara |
| 4 | DF | JPN | Yukiko Shimamura |
| 7 | MF | JPN | Yukiko Sue |
| 8 | MF | JPN | Marin Hamamoto |
| 9 | MF | JPN | Nagisa Matsuura |
| 11 | FW | JPN | Yoshin Hori |
| 13 | MF | JPN | Ai Hasegawa |
| 14 | MF | JPN | Yui Yamane |
| 15 | DF | JPN | Mayu Ando |
| 16 | GK | JPN | Mina Akiba |
| 17 | MF | JPN | Mai Endo |
| 18 | MF | JPN | Rika Kojima |

| No. | Pos. | Nation | Player |
|---|---|---|---|
| 19 | DF | JPN | Sayaka Morimoto |
| 20 | MF | JPN | Kiyoka Genseki |
| 21 | GK | JPN | Yuka Imai |
| 22 | MF | JPN | Aya Murayama |
| 23 | DF | JPN | Sujaku Haga |
| 24 | MF | JPN | Momoko Fujihara |
| 25 | MF | JPN | Natsuha Hayakari |
| 26 | MF | JPN | Ayano Ogawa |
| 27 | MF | JPN | Kaho Sugiura |
| 28 | MF | JPN | Nanami Kai |
| 29 | MF | JPN | Suzune Kajii |
| 31 | GK | JPN | Eiri Takahara |
| 32 | MF | JPN | Haruna Noda |
| 34 | MF | JPN | Momoko Nebu |
| 35 | MF | JPN | Shiho Shimoyamada |

== Results ==
| Season | Domestic League | | | | National Cup | League Cup |
| Season | League | Level | Place | Tms. | National Cup | League Cup |
|---|---|---|---|---|---|---|
| 2006 | Kanagawa; Div.1 | 5 | 2nd | 8 | DNQ | - |
| 2007 | Kanagawa; Div.1 | 5 | 1st | 8 | DNQ | - |
| 2008 | Kanagawa; Div.1 | 5 | 2nd | 8 | DNQ | - |
| 2009 | Kanagawa; Div.1 | 5 | 4th | 8 | DNQ | - |
| 2010 | Kanagawa; Div.1 | 5 | 5th | 9 | DNQ | - |
| 2011 | Kanagawa; Div.1 | 5 | 5th | 10 | DNQ | - |
| 2012 | Kanagawa; Div.1 | 5 | 4th | 10 | DNQ | - |
| 2013 | Kanagawa; Div.1 | 5 | 6th | 10 | DNQ | - |
| 2014 | Kanagawa; Div.1 | 5 | 5th | 7 | DNQ | - |
| 2015 | Challenge(East) | 3 | 4th | 6 | 2nd Stage | - |
| 2016 | Challenge | 3 | 2nd | 12 | DNQ | - |
| 2017 | Challenge | 3 | 3rd | 12 | 1st Stage | - |
| 2018 | | | | | | |
| 2019 | | | | | | |
| 2020 | | | | | | |
| 2021 | | | | | | |
| 2022 | | | | | | |
| 2023 | | | | | | |

== Transition of team name ==
- Yamato Sylphid 1998 : 1998 – 2013
- Yamato Sylphid : 2014 – Present
