= Cerezo Osaka Yanmar Ladies =

Cerezo Osaka Yanmar Ladies セレッソ大阪ヤンマーレディース
- Full name: Cerezo Osaka Yanmar Ladies
- Nicknames: Cerezo, Sakura (Cherry Blossoms)
- Founded: 2005; 21 years ago
- Ground: Yodoko Sakura Stadium
- Capacity: 24,481
- Chairman: Hiroaki Morishima
- Manager: Nobuhito Toriizuka
- League: WE League
- 2025–26: 10th
- Website: https://www.cerezo.jp/ladies/
Home colours	Away colours

Cerezo Osaka Yanmar Ladies (セレッソ大阪ヤンマーレディース, Seresso Ōsaka Yanmā Redīsu) is a professional women's football club based in Sakai and Osaka, Osaka. The team currently plays in the WE League, the top division of women's football in Japan.

== History ==
Cerezo Osaka, which has been playing in the J.League since 1995, established a women's class at its school in 2005 to strengthen women's football, and formed a women's team as Cerezo Osaka Ladies U-15 in 2010. The team later changed its name to Cerezo Osaka Ladies in 2012. The following year, the team entered the Japan Women's Soccer League, adopting the name of its hometown, Sakai, as well as Osaka, and changing its name to Cerezo Osaka Sakai Ladies.

In 2021, Japan's first professional women's soccer league, the WE League, was established, but Cerezo Osaka Sakai Ladies avoided participating due to the fact that most of their players were students. However, with many promising players deciding to move on, they made preparations to join, and on September 14, 2022, they were approved to join the WE League for the 2023-24 season.

On February 24, 2023, Cerezo Osaka Sakai Ladies announced that the team would change its name to Cerezo Osaka Yanmar Ladies after Yanmar acquired the naming rights.

== Club staff ==
Position	Name
Manager	(Japan) Nobuhito Toriizuka
Coach	(Japan) Ayumi Hasegawa
Goalkeeper Coach	(Japan) Daiji Kakii

== Squad ==
=== Current squad ===
As of 9 December 2023.

Note: Flags indicate national team as defined under FIFA eligibility rules; some limited exceptions apply. Players may hold more than one non-FIFA nationality.

No.	Pos.	Nation	Player
1	GK	JPN	Erika Fukunaga
2	DF	JPN	Hina Morinaka
3	DF	JPN	Hiromi Yoneda
4	DF	JPN	Riko Tsutsui
5	MF	JPN	Miki Maegawa
6	MF	JPN	Nao Matsumoto
7	DF	JPN	Yuri Ogikubo
8	FW	JPN	Tomoko Tanaka
9	MF	JPN	Warai Yoshizumi
10	MF	JPN	Shinomi Koyama
11	FW	JPN	Miyu Yakata
13	MF	JPN	Miyuka Momono
14	MF	JPN	Serika Takawa
15	MF	JPN	Rui Furusawa
16	MF	USA	Maia Tabion
17	DF	JPN	Rina Nakatani
18	MF	JPN	Hikari Miyamoto
19	MF	JPN	Yukina Shikai
20	FW	JPN	Kotono Tamazakura
21	GK	JPN	Rina Yamashita

No.	Pos.	Nation	Player
22	DF	JPN	Uno Shiragaki
23	DF	JPN	Mahiro Asayama
24	DF	JPN	Nodoka Fujiwara
25	FW	IDN	Zahra Muzdalifah
26	MF	JPN	Shuka Kitahara
27	GK	JPN	Maho Nishinaka
28	MF	JPN	Reina Wakisaka (Captain)
29	FW	JPN	Asaki Wada
36	FW	JPN	Yuka Kurimoto
37	MF	JPN	Fuu Nakanishi

== Season-by-season record ==
Season	Domestic League				Empress's Cup	Nadeshiko League Cup / WE League Cup
Season	League	Level	Place	Teams	Empress's Cup	Nadeshiko League Cup / WE League Cup
2010	Kansai Div. 2 (B)	4	5th	6	DNQ	—
2011	Kansai Div. 2 (A)	4	2nd	8	DNQ	—
2012	Kansai Div. 1	3	3rd	10	DNQ	—
2013	Challenge	2	3rd	16	1st Stage	—
2014	Challenge	2	14th	16	DNQ	—
2015	Challenge (West)	3	1st	6	DNQ	—
2016	Nadeshiko Div. 2	2	3rd	10	2nd Stage	Semi-finals
2017	Nadeshiko Div. 2	2	2nd	10	3rd Stage	Winner / Div. 2
2018	Nadeshiko Div. 1	1	10th	10	3rd Stage	Group Stage
2019	Nadeshiko Div. 2	2	2nd	10	3rd Stage	Winner / Div. 2
2020	Nadeshiko Div. 1	1	4th	10	Quarter-finals	—
2021	Nadeshiko Div. 1	2	3rd	12	Semi-finals	—
2022	Nadeshiko Div. 1	2	4th	12	Third Round	—
2023–24	WE League	1	TBD	12	TBD	TBD

== Transition of team name ==
- Cerezo Osaka Ladies: (2010–2012)
- Cerezo Osaka Sakai Ladies: (2013–2023)
- Cerezo Osaka Yanmar Ladies: (1 April 2023 – 31 January 2025)

== See also ==
- List of women's football clubs in Japan
- Japan Football Association
