= Nittaidai SMG Yokohama =

- Full name: Nittaidai SMG Yokohama
- Nickname: Nittaidai FC Ladies
- Founded: 1985
- Ground: NHK Spring Mitsuzawa Football Stadium
- Manager: Harunosuke Yano
- Coach: Shigehisa Otsuki
- League: Nadeshiko League Div.1
- 2024: Nadeshiko League Div.1, 6th of 12
- Website: http://www.nittai-fc.com/ladies/
Home colours

Nittaidai SMG Yokohama (日体大SMG横浜) (known as Nittaidai (日体大) FC Ladies for short) is a women's football club playing in Japan's top women's football league, Nadeshiko League Division 1.

The team is affiliated with the Nippon Sport Science University based in Yokohama. The team also participates in the Kanto University League, Kanagawa Prefecture League, and Tokyo League. In June 2015, the team signed a sponsorship agreement with "Fields Corporation" (ja) and team name was changed to "Nippon Sport Science University Fields Yokohama".

== Squad ==
=== Current squad ===
As of 2 May 2022.

Note: Flags indicate national team as defined under FIFA eligibility rules; some limited exceptions apply. Players may hold more than one non-FIFA nationality.

No.	Pos.	Nation	Player
1	GK	JPN	Maya Ino
2	DF	JPN	Miyu Mori
3	DF	JPN	Risa Kanehira
4	DF	JPN	Mai Sekiguchi
5	DF	JPN	Chihiro Tomioka
6	DF	JPN	Miina Matsunaga
7	MF	JPN	Misaki Morita
8	MF	JPN	Mai Watanabe
9	MF	JPN	Wakana Onishi
10	FW	PRK	Song-A Lee
11	MF	JPN	Ami Kubota
12	GK	JPN	Miku Washizawa
13	DF	JPN	Chisato Maruyama
14	MF	JPN	Amane Takahara
15	DF	JPN	Miku Gunji

No.	Pos.	Nation	Player
16	MF	JPN	Mayu Kaneko
17	MF	JPN	Ami Takahashi
18	FW	JPN	Hono Matsumoto
19	GK	JPN	Mai Sato
20	FW	JPN	Sayaka Taniguchi
21	MF	JPN	Kotono Sakuraba
22	MF	JPN	Ako Okamoto
23	MF	JPN	Urara Watanabe
24	MF	JPN	Kanon Tamura
25	MF	JPN	Yua Kato
26	DF	JPN	Emiri Takahashi
27	FW	JPN	Honoka Eto
28	DF	JPN	Nanami Chiba
29	DF	JPN	Asuka Komaki
30	GK	JPN	Fuari Yagi

== Results ==
Season	Domestic League				National Cup	League Cup
Season	League	Level	Place	Tms.	National Cup	League Cup
2005	Kanto	3	2nd	8	DNQ	-
2006	Kanto	3	2nd	8	DNQ	-
2007	Kanto	3	1st	8	2nd Stage	-
2008	Kanto	3	1st	8	3rd Stage	-
2009	Kanto	3	5th	8	DNQ	-
2010	Challenge (East)	2	3rd	6	3rd Stage	-
2011	Challenge (East)	2	4th	6	DNQ	-
2012	Challenge	2	4th	12	2nd Stage	-
2013	Challenge	2	9th	16	2nd Stage	-
2014	Challenge	2	2nd	16	3rd Stage	-
2015	Nadeshiko Div.2	2	3rd	10	3rd Stage	-
2016	Nadeshiko Div.2	2	6th	10	3rd Stage	Runners-up / Div.2
2017	Nadeshiko Div.2	2	1st	10	3rd Stage	Runners-up / Div.2
2018	Nadeshiko Div. 1	1	9th	10	3rd Stage	-
2019						
2020						
2021						
2022						
2023						

== Supporter's Club ==
Nittaidai Ladies FC is supported by the Blue "S" Supporters Club.

== Transition of team name ==
- Nippon Sport Science University LSC: 1985 - 2014
- Nippon Sport Science University SC Yokohama: 2015
- Nittaidai Fields Yokohama: 2015 – 2021
- Nittaidai SMG Yokohama: 2022 – Present
