= Orca Kamogawa FC =

Orca Kamogawa FC オルカ鴨川FC
- Full name: Orca Kamogawa FC
- Nickname: Orca
- Founded: 2014; 11 years ago
- Ground: Kamogawa Stadium
- Capacity: 4,240
- Manager: Ayako Kitamoto
- League: Nadeshiko League Div.1
- 2024: Nadeshiko League Div.1, 8th of 12 (champions)
- Website: www.orcakamogawafc.com

Orca Kamogawa FC (オルカ鴨川FC, Oruka Kamogawa) is a women's football club playing in Japan's football league, the Nadeshiko League Division 1. Its hometown is the city of Kamogawa.

== Current squad ==
As of 2 April 2022.

Note: Flags indicate national team as defined under FIFA eligibility rules; some limited exceptions apply. Players may hold more than one non-FIFA nationality.

No.	Pos.	Nation	Player
1	GK	JPN	Shizuka Arima
3	DF	JPN	Miyoshi Akaogi
4	DF	JPN	Erina Kobayashi
6	MF	JPN	Takako Gonno
7	MF	JPN	Risa Urashima
8	MF	JPN	Nozomi Fujita
10	FW	USA	Hannah Diaz
11	FW	JPN	Mariko Nagaki
13	MF	JPN	Asuka Kakazu
14	FW	JPN	Mami Muraoka
15	MF	JPN	Toshiko Saito

No.	Pos.	Nation	Player
16	GK	JPN	Hanami Kawabe
17	MF	JPN	Nakashima Yoshino
18	MF	JPN	Manami Nishio
19	MF	JPN	Yuriko Okano
20	FW	JPN	Yuki Tsuchiya
21	MF	JPN	Marine Naruoka
22	DF	JPN	Mao Miyamoto
23	DF	JPN	Shiho Yoshida
25	DF	JPN	Miki Hirata
26	GK	JPN	Shoko Kunika
27	FW	JPN	Seira Kojima

== Results ==
Season	Domestic League				National Cup	League Cup
Season	League	Level	Place	Tms.	National Cup	League Cup
2014	Chiba Div.2	6	2nd	11	DNQ	-
2015	Chiba Div.1	6	1st	7	DNQ	-
2016	Challenge	3	1st	12	2nd Stage	-
2017	Nadeshiko Div.2	2	4th	10	3rd Stage	Group stage / Div.2
2018	Nadeshiko Div.2	2	4th	10	3rd Stage	Group stage / Div.2
2019	Nadeshiko Div.2	2	4th	10	Quarter-finals	Group stage / Div.2
2020	Nadeshiko Div.2	2	3rd	10	3rd Stage	Canceled
2021	Nadeshiko Div.1	2	9th	12	4th Stage	-
2022	Nadeshiko Div.1	2	5th	12	3rd Stage	-
2023	Nadeshiko Div.1	2	1st	12	TBD	-
