= Fukuoka J. Anclas =

Fukuoka J. Anclas 福岡Jアンクラス
- Full name: Fukuoka J. Anclas
- Nickname(s): Fukuoka AN
- Founded: 1986
- Manager: Mie Kawashima
- League: Nadeshiko League Div.2
- 2022: Nadeshiko League Div.2, 6th of 10
- Website: http://www.anclas.jp/
Home colours	Away colours

Fukuoka J. Anclas is a Japanese women's football club from Fukuoka. Founded in 1986, it has played in the Nadeshiko League since 2010. The team was relegated in the 2024 season after being defeated by VONDS Ichihara FC Ladies in the Nadeshiko League playoff.

== Squad ==
=== Current squad ===
As of 5 April 2018 Note: Flags indicate national team as defined under FIFA eligibility rules; some limited exceptions apply. Players may hold more than one non-FIFA nationality.

No.	Pos.	Nation	Player
1	GK	(Japan) JPN	Hoshimi Kishi
2	FW	(Japan) JPN	Shiori Yanagita
3	DF	(Japan) JPN	Chisa Ito
4	MF	(Japan) JPN	Hitomi Nariai
5	MF	(Japan) JPN	Misato Doushita
6	MF	(Japan) JPN	Kotome Ukita
7	FW	(Japan) JPN	Narumi Doi
9	MF	(Japan) JPN	Shihori Fukui
10	DF	(Japan) JPN	Aiko Hanada
11	MF	(Japan) JPN	Chizuru Takahashi

No.	Pos.	Nation	Player
13	FW	(Japan) JPN	Rie Marugata
14	DF	(Japan) JPN	Marin Fujisawa
15	MF	(Japan) JPN	Natsumi Kobayashi
18	MF	(Japan) JPN	Sakura Sakanashi
19	MF	(Japan) JPN	Akane Yatsugi
20	MF	(Japan) JPN	Aira Nishida
21	GK	(Japan) JPN	Erina Ueda
22	DF	(Japan) JPN	Misato Komatsu
23	DF	(Japan) JPN	Misato Hirata

== Results ==
Season	Domestic League				National Cup	League Cup
Season	League	Level	Place	Tms.	National Cup	League Cup
1999	Kyushu	2	1st	5	2nd Stage	-
2000	Kyushu	2	1st	5	DNQ	-
2001	Kyushu	2	1st	6	1st Stage	-
2002	Kyushu	2	1st	7	1st Stage	-
2003	Kyushu	2	1st	7	DNQ	-
2004	Kyushu	3	1st	8	DNQ	-
2005	Kyushu	3	1st	8	1st Stage	-
2006	Nadeshiko; Div.2	2	3rd	8	3rd Stage	-
2007	Nadeshiko; Div.2	2	3rd	8	2nd Stage	Group Stage
2008	Nadeshiko; Div.2	2	5th	9	1st Stage	-
2009	Nadeshiko; Div.2	2	3rd	8	3rd Stage	-
2010	Nadeshiko	1	8th	10	3rd Stage	Group Stage
2011	Nadeshiko	1	9th	9	3rd Stage	-
2012	Nadeshiko	1	10th	10	3rd Stage	Group Stage
2013	Challenge	2	5th	16	1st Stage	-
2014	Challenge	2	12th	16	1st Stage	-
2015	Nadeshiko Div.2	2	9th	10	1st Stage	-
2016	Challenge	3	7th	12	1st Stage	-
2017	Challenge	3	10th	12	2nd Stage	-
2018	Kyushu Div.2		1st	9	1st Stage	
2019	Kyushu Div.1		1st	8	DNQ	
2020	Challenge		3rd (West)	6	2nd Stage	
2021	Nadeshiko Div.2	3	4th	8	3rd Stage	
2022	Nadeshiko Div.2	3	5th	10	1st Stage	
2023	Nadeshiko Div.2	3	4th	10		
2024	Nadeshiko Div.2	3	12th	12		

== Transition of team name ==
- Fukuoka Jogakuin FC: 1986–1999
- Fukuoka Jogakuin FC Anclas: 2000–2005
- Fukuoka J. Anclas: 2006–present
