= Ange Violet Hiroshima =

Angeviolet Hiroshima アンジュヴィオレ広島
- Full name: Angeviolet Hiroshima
- Founded: 2012
- Chairman: Fumio Kishida
- Manager: Seiji Morishita
- League: Nadeshiko League Div.1
- 2022: Nadeshiko League Div.1, 12th of 12
- Website: http://angeviolet.com/index.php

Angeviolet Hiroshima (アンジュヴィオレ広島) was a women's football club. Its hometown was the city of Hiroshima.

== Squad ==
=== Current squad ===
As of 02 April 2022. Note: Flags indicate national team as defined under FIFA eligibility rules; some limited exceptions apply. Players may hold more than one non-FIFA nationality.

No.	Pos.	Nation	Player
1	GK	JPN	Kumiko Uetani
2	DF	JPN	Hitomi Saito
3	DF	JPN	Nanae Kinjo
4	FW	JPN	Aya Kuramoto
5	MF	JPN	Hisami Yamagata
6	DF	JPN	Yuki Takeda
7	FW	JPN	Mizuki Akamine
8	MF	JPN	Emi Yokoyama
9	FW	JPN	Yurie Yamaguchi
13	DF	JPN	Yuka Tokoro
14	MF	JPN	Kazumi Watanabe
15	DF	JPN	Natsuki Konishi
16	FW	JPN	Arisa Uozumi

No.	Pos.	Nation	Player
17	MF	JPN	Sonoka Ichikawa
18	DF	JPN	Kurumi Yamashita
19	DF	JPN	Mayumi Yamashita
20	DF	JPN	Kana Kitagawa
21	GK	JPN	Megumi Kameda
22	MF	JPN	Yuri Mizuno
23	FW	JPN	Sae Tateishi
24	DF	JPN	Ikumi Matsuda
25	MF	JPN	Ayumi Miyake
26	MF	JPN	Fumika Akagi
27	MF	JPN	Ayuki Egashira
28	DF	JPN	Nozomi Kato
29	DF	JPN	Miki Kanayama
30	MF	JPN	Tsugumi Kubo
32	DF	JPN	Maaya Kawano

== Results ==
Season	Domestic League				National Cup	League Cup
Season	League	Level	Place	Tms.	National Cup	League Cup
2012	Hiroshima	4	1st	8	DNQ	-
2013	Chugoku	3	1st	10	1st Stage	-
2014	Challenge	2	10th	16	3rd Stage	-
2015	Nadeshiko; Div.2	2	5th	10	3rd Stage	-
2016	Nadeshiko; Div.2	2	10th	10	1st Stage	Group Stage / Div.2
2017	Challenge	3	5th	12	2nd Stage	-
2018						
2019						
2020						
2021						
2022						
2023						
