= Norddea Hokkaido =

Japanese association football club in Sapporo

Norddea Hokkaido ノルディーア北海道
- Full name: Norddea Hokkaido
- Nickname: Norddea Hokkaido
- Founded: 2004
- Manager: Masayuki Miura
- League: Nadeshiko League Div.2
- 2022: Nadeshiko League Div.2, 7th
- Website: http://www.norddea.jp/
Home colours	Away colours

Norddea Hokkaido (ノルディーア北海道) is a women's football club playing in Japan's Hokkaido League. Its hometown is the city of Sapporo, Hokkaido.

== Squad ==
=== Current squad ===
As of 14 July 2020. Note: Flags indicate national team as defined under FIFA eligibility rules; some limited exceptions apply. Players may hold more than one non-FIFA nationality.

No.	Pos.	Nation	Player
1	GK	JPN	Azusa Watanabe
2	DF	JPN	Yumeka Kikuchi
3	DF	JPN	Touko Hasatani
4	DF	JPN	Akiho Minato
5	DF	JPN	Hitoe Arita
6	MF	JPN	Misato Mori
7	MF	JPN	Mayuko Watanabe
8	MF	JPN	Yuri Sanogawa
9	FW	JPN	Ayaka Hoshiyama
10	FW	JPN	Miki Kannari (c)
11	FW	JPN	Azami Saito
13	MF	JPN	Wakana Narumi

No.	Pos.	Nation	Player
14	FW	JPN	Yuna Yamazaki
15	MF	JPN	Yukari Arai
16	GK	JPN	Mai Konno
17	DF	JPN	Rina Takahashi
18	MF	JPN	Mio Ebisu
19	MF	JPN	Eri Hashimoto
20	DF	JPN	Miran Kan
22	MF	JPN	Rina Takahashi
23	MF	JPN	Rei Uno
24	DF	JPN	Amiri Misumi
25	FW	JPN	Mai Tomita
27	FW	JPN	Airi Mogami

== Results ==
Season	Domestic League				National Cup	League Cup
Season	League	Level	Place	Tms.	National Cup	League Cup
2005	Hokkaido	4	1st		DNQ	-
2006	Hokkaido	3	2nd		1st Stage	-
2007	Hokkaido	3	3rd		DNQ	-
2008	Hokkaido	3	2nd		DNQ	-
2009	Hokkaido	3	3rd	5	1st Stage	-
2010	Challenge (East)	2	5th	6	2nd Stage	-
2011	Challenge (East)	2	6th	6	2nd Stage	-
2012	Hokkaido	3	3rd	4	DNQ	-
2013	Hokkaido	3	2nd	5	DNQ	-
2014	Hokkaido	3	1st	6	1st Stage	-
2015	Challenge(East)	3	5th	6	1st Stage	-
2016	Challenge	3	5th	12	1st Stage	-
2017	Challenge	3	11th	12	1st Stage	-
2018						
2019						
2020						
2021						
2022						
2023						

== Transition of team name ==
- FC Adooma: 2004–2006
- ASC Adooma: 2007–2009
- Norddea Hokkaido: 2010 – Present

The team name comes from Italian Nord (north) and dea (goddess).
