= Ehime FC Ladies =

Ehime F.C. Ladies 愛媛F.C.レディース
- Full name: Ehime F.C. Ladies
- Nickname: Ehime F.C. Ladies
- Founded: 2011
- Ground: Ningineer Stadium
- League: Nadeshiko League Div.1
- 2024: Nadeshiko League Div.1, 9th of 12
- Website: ehimefc.com/ladies.html
Home colours	Away colours

Ehime F.C. Ladies (愛媛F.C.レディース) is a women's football club playing in Japan's football league, Nadeshiko Div. 1. Its hometown is the city of Matsuyama, Ehime.

== Squad ==
=== Current squad ===
As of 27 February 2020.

Note: Flags indicate national team as defined under FIFA eligibility rules; some limited exceptions apply. Players may hold more than one non-FIFA nationality.

No.	Pos.	Nation	Player
1	GK	JPN	Hanako Osako
2	DF	JPN	Nozomi Nishimura
3	DF	JPN	Ayaka Mukaidani
4	DF	JPN	Ran Kamata
5	DF	JPN	Maiko Kariya
6	MF	JPN	Shiori Watai
7	MF	JPN	Sayumi Nishigawa
8	MF	JPN	Yuka Iwamoto
9	FW	JPN	Ayumu Ooya
10	MF	JPN	Miyuki Yamashiro
11	MF	JPN	Saori Haruyama
12	GK	JPN	Sayaka Kitaike
14	MF	JPN	Manami Ogawa
15	MF	JPN	Akari Kawamura
16	DF	JPN	Miyu Ono

No.	Pos.	Nation	Player
18	MF	JPN	Mana Akune
19	MF	JPN	Mizuho Niwa
20	FW	JPN	Natsumi Tagami
21	GK	JPN	Yukiko Ueno
22	DF	JPN	Natsumi Taketa
24	MF	JPN	Mana Momota
25	DF	JPN	Mafuyu Muramatsu
27	MF	JPN	Kanami Kanemoto
28	DF	JPN	Hazuki Onoue
29	DF	JPN	Nao Tanioka
30	FW	JPN	Hinako Nakachi
31	DF	JPN	Mika Akinaka
32	DF	JPN	Yumeno Yamaguchi
33	GK	JPN	Chiaki Tomonaga
34	GK	JPN	Saki Nakamura

== Results ==
Season	Domestic League				National Cup	League Cup
Season	League	Level	Place	Tms.	National Cup	League Cup
2011	Shikoku	3	1st	4	3rd Stage	-
2012	Challenge	2	7th	12	1st Stage	-
2013	Challenge	2	8th	16	3rd Stage	-
2014	Challenge	2	9th	16	3rd Stage	-
2015	Nadeshiko; Div.2	2	6th	10	2nd Stage	-
2016	Nadeshiko; Div.2	2	4th	10	3rd Stage	Group Stage / Div.2
2017	Nadeshiko; Div.2	2	3rd	10	2nd Stage	Group Stage / Div.2
2018						
2019						
2020						
2021						
2022						
2023						
