= Asato Miyagawa =

Japanese footballer (born 1998)

Asato Miyagawa 宮川 麻都
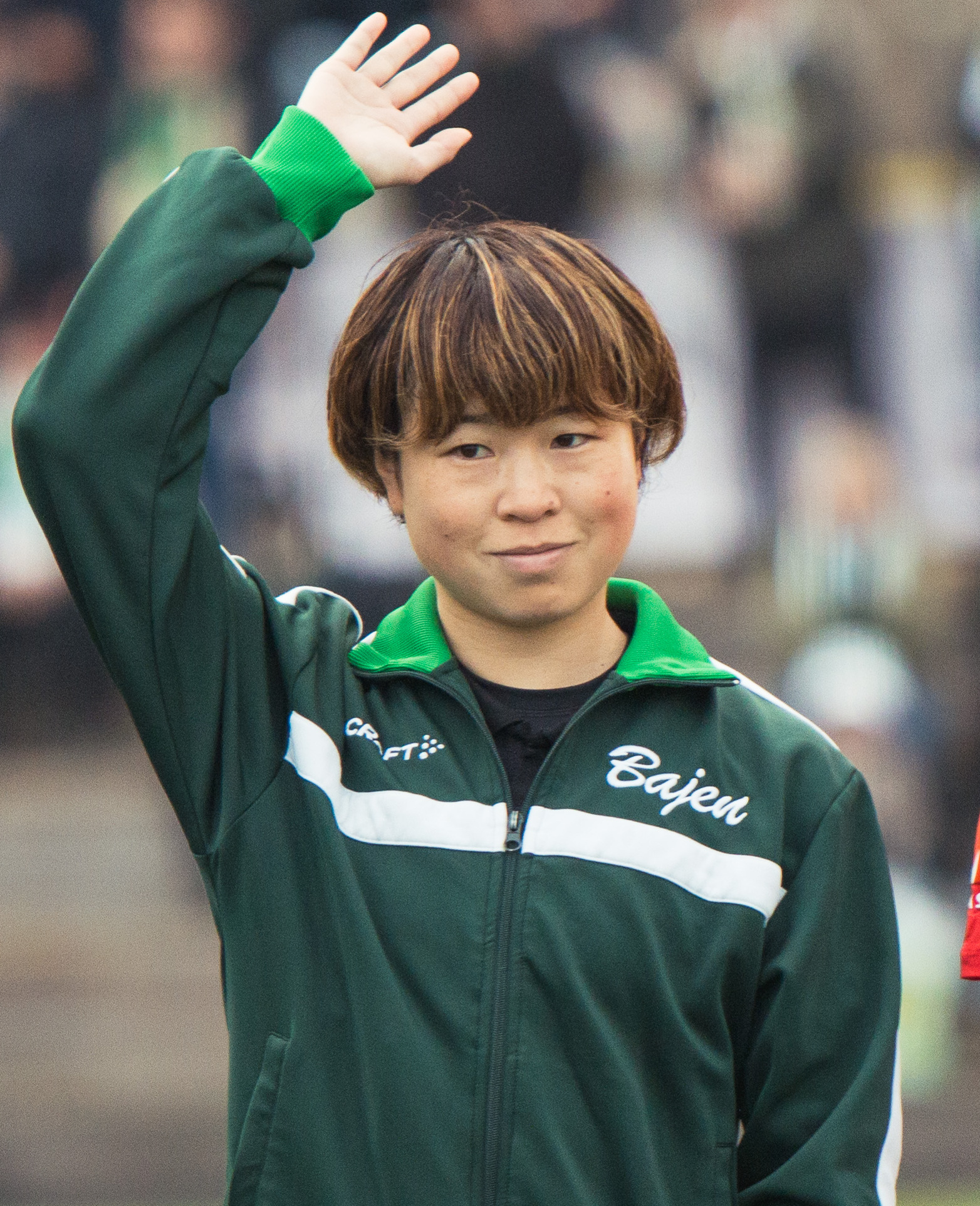
- Miyagawa with Hammarby IF in 2025

Personal information
- Full name: Asato Miyagawa
- Date of birth: February 24, 1998 (age 28)
- Place of birth: Yokohama, Kanagawa, Japan
- Height: 1.60 m (5 ft 3 in)
- Position: Defender

Team information
- Current team: Birmingham City
- Number: 26

Youth career
- 2013–2015: Tokyo Verdy Beleza

Senior career*
Years	Team	Apps	(Gls)
2016–2024	Tokyo Verdy Beleza	93	(6)
2024–2025	Hammarby IF	35	(4)
2026–	Birmingham City	0	(0)

International career^{‡}
2014	Japan U-17	6	(2)
2016–2018	Japan U-20	10	(0)
2019–	Japan	23	(0)
Medal record
Nippon TV Beleza
Winner	Nadeshiko League	2016
Winner	Nadeshiko League	2017
Winner	Nadeshiko League	2018
Winner	Nadeshiko League Cup	2016
Winner	Nadeshiko League Cup	2018
Winner	Empress's Cup	2017
Winner	Empress's Cup	2018
Representing Japan
FIFA U-20 Women's World Cup
Bronze medal – third place	2016 Papua New Guinea
Gold medal – first place	2018 France
AFC U-19 Women's Championship
Gold medal – first place	2015 China
Gold medal – first place	2017 China
FIFA U-17 Women's World Cup
Gold medal – first place	2014 Costa Rica
AFC U-16 Women's Championship
Gold medal – first place	2013 China
- * Club domestic league appearances and goals as of November 20, 2025 ‡ National team caps and goals as of 18:03, 2 May 2026 (UTC)

Asato Miyagawa (宮川 麻都, Miyagawa Asato; born February 24, 1998) is a Japanese football player who plays as a defender for Women's Super League club Birmingham City and the Japan national team.

== Club career ==
Miyagawa was born in Kanagawa Prefecture on February 24, 1998. She was promoted to L.League club Nippon TV Beleza from youth team in 2016.

On 11 July 2024, Miyagawa was announced at Hammarby IF on a two and a half year contract.

On 23 December 2025, Birmingham City confirmed the signing of Miyagawa which took effect on January 2, 2026.

== National team career ==
In 2014, Miyagawa was selected Japan U-17 national team for 2014 U-17 World Cup. She played in all 6 matches and scored 2 goals, and Japan won the championship.

In 2016, Miyagawa was selected Japan U-20 national team for 2016 U-20 World Cup. She played in 4 matches and Japan won the 3rd place.

In 2018, Miyagawa was selected Japan U-20 national team for 2018 U-20 World Cup second time. She played in all 6 matches and Japan won the championship.

In February 2019, Miyagawa was selected Japan national team for SheBelieves Cup. At this tournament, on March 2, she debuted as right back against Brazil.

On 10 May 2019, Miyagawa was included in the 23-player squad for the 2019 FIFA Women's World Cup.

On 18 June 2021, she was included in the Japan squad for the 2020 Summer Olympics.

On 7 January 2022, Miyagawa was called up to the 2022 AFC Women's Asian Cup squad.

== Career statistics ==
=== International ===
As of match played 9 October 2022

Appearances and goals by national team and year
National team	Year	Apps	Goals
Japan
Japan	2019	9	0
Japan	2020	2	0
Japan	2021	6	0
Japan	2022	6	0
Total		23	0

== Honours ==
Tokyo Verdy Beleza

- Nadeshiko League: 2016, 2017, 2018, 2019
- Nadeshiko League Cup: 2016, 2018, 2019
- Empress's Cup: 2017, 2018, 2019, 2020
- AFC Women's Club Championship: 2019

Hammarby IF

- Svenska Cupen: 2024–25

Birmingham City

- Women's Super League 2: 2025–26
