= 2019 SheBelieves Cup squads =

List of players competing at the 4th edition of the SheBelieves Cup

This article lists the squads for the 2019 SheBelieves Cup, the 4th edition of the SheBelieves Cup. The cup consisted of a series of friendly games, and was held in the United States from 27 February to 5 March 2019. The four national teams involved in the tournament registered a squad of 23 players.

The age listed for each player is on 27 February 2019, the first day of the tournament. The club listed is the club for which the player last played a competitive match prior to the tournament. The nationality for each club reflects the national association (not the league) to which the club is affiliated. A flag is included for coaches that are of a different nationality than their own national team.

== Squads ==
=== Brazil ===
Coach: Vadão

The final squad was announced on 21 February 2019.

No.	Pos.	Player	Date of birth (age)	Caps	Goals	Club
1	GK	Lelê	13 August 1994 (aged 24)			(Brazilian Football Confederation) Corinthians
2	DF	Letícia	1 December 1994 (aged 24)			(German Football Association) SC Sand
3	DF	Jucinara	3 August 1993 (aged 25)			(Royal Spanish Football Federation) Valencia
4	DF	Érika	4 February 1988 (aged 31)			(Brazilian Football Confederation) Corinthians
5	MF	Thaisa	17 December 1988 (aged 30)			(Italian Football Federation) Milan
6	DF	Tamires	10 October 1987 (aged 31)			(Danish Football Association) Fortuna Hjørring
7	MF	Andressa Alves	10 November 1992 (aged 26)			(Royal Spanish Football Federation) Barcelona
8	MF	Formiga	3 March 1978 (aged 40)			(French Football Federation) Paris Saint-Germain
9	FW	Debinha	20 October 1991 (aged 27)			(United States Soccer Federation) North Carolina Courage
10	MF	Marta (captain)	19 February 1986 (aged 33)			(United States Soccer Federation) Orlando Pride
11	FW	Adriana	17 November 1996 (aged 22)			(Brazilian Football Confederation) Corinthians
12	GK	Aline	15 April 1989 (aged 29)			(Royal Spanish Football Federation) Granadilla
13	DF	Tayla	9 May 1992 (aged 26)			(Portuguese Football Federation) Benfica
14	DF	Kathellen	26 April 1996 (aged 22)			(French Football Federation) Bordeaux
15	DF	Poliana	6 February 1991 (aged 28)			(Brazilian Football Confederation) São José
16	FW	Beatriz	17 December 1993 (aged 25)			(Korea Football Association) Incheon Hyundai Steel Red Angels
17	MF	Juliana	22 December 1991 (aged 27)			(Brazilian Football Confederation) Flamengo
18	FW	Geyse	27 March 1998 (aged 20)			(Portuguese Football Federation) Benfica
19	FW	Ludmila	1 December 1994 (aged 24)			(Royal Spanish Football Federation) Atlético Madrid
20	FW	Raquel	21 March 1991 (aged 27)			(Royal Spanish Football Federation) Sporting Huelva
21	DF	Mônica	21 April 1987 (aged 31)			(United States Soccer Federation) Orlando Pride
22	GK	Luciana	24 July 1987 (aged 31)			(Brazilian Football Confederation) Ferroviária
23	MF	Luana	2 May 1993 (aged 25)			(Korea Football Association) Hwacheon KSPO

=== England ===
Coach: Phil Neville

The final squad was announced on 19 February 2019. Jill Scott withdrew from the squad on 24 February 2019 to manage her fitness and was replaced with Chioma Ubogagu.

No.	Pos.	Player	Date of birth (age)	Caps	Goals	Club
1	GK	Karen Bardsley	14 October 1984 (aged 34)			(The Football Association) Manchester City
2	DF	Lucy Bronze	28 October 1991 (aged 27)			(French Football Federation) Lyon
3	DF	Alex Greenwood	7 September 1993 (aged 25)			(The Football Association) Manchester United
4	MF	Keira Walsh	8 April 1997 (aged 21)			(The Football Association) Manchester City
5	DF	Steph Houghton (captain)	23 April 1988 (aged 30)			(The Football Association) Manchester City
6	DF	Abbie McManus	14 January 1993 (aged 26)			(The Football Association) Manchester City
7	FW	Nikita Parris	10 March 1994 (aged 24)			(The Football Association) Manchester City
8	MF	Izzy Christiansen	20 September 1991 (aged 27)			(French Football Federation) Lyon
9	FW	Jodie Taylor	17 May 1986 (aged 32)			(United States Soccer Federation) Reign FC
10	MF	Fran Kirby	29 June 1993 (aged 25)			(The Football Association) Chelsea
11	FW	Toni Duggan	25 July 1991 (aged 27)			(Royal Spanish Football Federation) Barcelona
12	DF	Demi Stokes	12 December 1991 (aged 27)			(The Football Association) Manchester City
13	GK	Carly Telford	7 July 1987 (aged 31)			(The Football Association) Chelsea
14	DF	Gemma Bonner	13 July 1991 (aged 27)			(The Football Association) Manchester City
15	DF	Leah Williamson	29 March 1997 (aged 21)			(The Football Association) Arsenal
16	FW	Chioma Ubogagu	10 September 1992 (aged 26)			(United States Soccer Federation) Orlando Pride
17	DF	Rachel Daly	6 December 1991 (aged 27)			(United States Soccer Federation) Houston Dash
18	FW	Ellen White	9 May 1989 (aged 29)			(The Football Association) Birmingham City
19	MF	Georgia Stanway	3 January 1999 (aged 20)			(The Football Association) Manchester City
20	MF	Karen Carney	1 August 1987 (aged 31)			(The Football Association) Chelsea
21	GK	Mary Earps	7 March 1993 (aged 25)			(German Football Association) VfL Wolfsburg
22	FW	Beth Mead	9 May 1995 (aged 23)			(The Football Association) Arsenal
23	MF	Lucy Staniforth	2 October 1992 (aged 26)			(The Football Association) Birmingham City

=== Japan ===
Coach: Asako Takakura

The final squad was announced on 15 February 2019. Rei Takenaka and Ayaka Saitō replaced Sakiko Ikeda and Ayaka Yamashita who withdrew due to injuries.

No.	Pos.	Player	Date of birth (age)	Caps	Goals	Club
1	GK	Rei Takenaka	18 May 1992 (aged 26)			(Japan Football Association) INAC Kobe Leonessa
2	MF	Rumi Utsugi	5 December 1988 (aged 30)			(United States Soccer Federation) Reign FC
3	DF	Aya Sameshima	16 June 1987 (aged 31)			(Japan Football Association) INAC Kobe Leonessa
4	DF	Saki Kumagai (captain)	17 October 1990 (aged 28)			(French Football Federation) Lyon
5	DF	Nana Ichise	4 August 1997 (aged 21)			(Japan Football Association) Vegalta Sendai
6	DF	Saori Ariyoshi	1 November 1987 (aged 31)			(Japan Football Association) Nippon TV Beleza
7	MF	Emi Nakajima	27 September 1990 (aged 28)			(Japan Football Association) INAC Kobe Leonessa
8	MF	Moeno Sakaguchi	4 June 1992 (aged 26)			(Japan Football Association) Albirex Niigata
9	MF	Hina Sugita	31 January 1997 (aged 22)			(Japan Football Association) INAC Kobe Leonessa
11	FW	Rikako Kobayashi	21 July 1997 (aged 21)			(Japan Football Association) Nippon TV Beleza
12	DF	Risako Oga	4 January 1997 (aged 22)			(Japan Football Association) Nojima Stella Kanagawa
13	FW	Mayu Ikejiri	19 December 1996 (aged 22)			(Korea Football Association) Suwon UDC
14	MF	Yui Hasegawa	29 January 1997 (aged 22)			(Japan Football Association) Nippon TV Beleza
15	FW	Yuka Momiki	9 April 1996 (aged 22)			(Japan Football Association) Nippon TV Beleza
16	MF	Arisa Matsubara	1 May 1995 (aged 23)			(Japan Football Association) Nojima Stella Kanagawa
17	MF	Narumi Miura	3 July 1997 (aged 21)			(Japan Football Association) Nippon TV Beleza
18	GK	Ayaka Saitō	26 August 1991 (aged 27)			(Japan Football Association) Vegalta Sendai
19	FW	Jun Endo	24 May 2000 (aged 18)			(Japan Football Association) Nippon TV Beleza
20	FW	Kumi Yokoyama	13 August 1993 (aged 25)			(Japan Football Association) AC Nagano Parceiro
21	GK	Erina Yamane	20 December 1990 (aged 28)			(Royal Spanish Football Federation) Real Betis
22	DF	Risa Shimizu	15 June 1996 (aged 22)			(Japan Football Association) Nippon TV Beleza
23	DF	Moeka Minami	7 December 1998 (aged 20)			(Japan Football Association) Urawa Red Diamonds
24	DF	Asato Miyagawa	24 February 1998 (aged 21)			(Japan Football Association) Nippon TV Beleza

=== United States ===
Coach: Jill Ellis

The final squad was announced on 12 February 2019. Danielle Colaprico suffered a groin injury and was replaced by Emily Fox on 26 February 2020.

No.	Pos.	Player	Date of birth (age)	Caps	Goals	Club
1	GK	Alyssa Naeher	April 20, 1988 (aged 30)	40	0	(United States Soccer Federation) Chicago Red Stars
2	DF	Emily Sonnett	November 25, 1993 (aged 25)	28	0	(United States Soccer Federation) Portland Thorns
3	MF	Sam Mewis	October 9, 1992 (aged 26)	43	8	(United States Soccer Federation) North Carolina Courage
4	DF	Becky Sauerbrunn	June 6, 1985 (aged 33)	151	0	(United States Soccer Federation) Utah Royals
5	DF	Kelley O'Hara	August 4, 1988 (aged 30)	112	2	(United States Soccer Federation) Utah Royals
6	MF	Andi Sullivan	December 20, 1995 (aged 23)	11	0	(United States Soccer Federation) Washington Spirit
7	DF	Abby Dahlkemper	May 13, 1993 (aged 25)	32	0	(United States Soccer Federation) North Carolina Courage
8	MF	Julie Ertz	April 6, 1992 (aged 26)	74	18	(United States Soccer Federation) Chicago Red Stars
10	FW	Carli Lloyd	July 16, 1982 (aged 36)	266	105	(United States Soccer Federation) Sky Blue
11	FW	Mallory Pugh	April 29, 1998 (aged 20)	45	13	(United States Soccer Federation) Washington Spirit
12	DF	Tierna Davidson	September 19, 1998 (aged 20)	14	1	(United States Soccer Federation) Chicago Red Stars
13	FW	Alex Morgan	July 2, 1989 (aged 29)	155	98	(United States Soccer Federation) Orlando Pride
14	DF	Casey Short	August 23, 1990 (aged 28)	27	0	(United States Soccer Federation) Chicago Red Stars
15	FW	Megan Rapinoe (captain)	July 5, 1985 (aged 33)	146	41	(United States Soccer Federation) Reign FC
16	MF	Rose Lavelle	May 14, 1995 (aged 23)	21	6	(United States Soccer Federation) Washington Spirit
17	FW	Tobin Heath	May 29, 1988 (aged 30)	143	25	(United States Soccer Federation) Portland Thorns
19	DF	Crystal Dunn	July 3, 1992 (aged 26)	77	24	(United States Soccer Federation) North Carolina Courage
20	FW	Jessica McDonald	February 28, 1988 (aged 30)	5	1	(United States Soccer Federation) North Carolina Courage
21	GK	Adrianna Franch	November 12, 1990 (aged 28)	0	0	(United States Soccer Federation) Portland Thorns
22	DF	Emily Fox	July 5, 1998 (aged 20)	3	0	(United States Soccer Federation) North Carolina Tar Heels
23	FW	Christen Press	December 29, 1988 (aged 30)	108	47	(United States Soccer Federation) Utah Royals
24	GK	Ashlyn Harris	October 19, 1985 (aged 33)	19	0	(United States Soccer Federation) Orlando Pride
25	MF	McCall Zerboni	December 13, 1986 (aged 32)	8	0	(United States Soccer Federation) North Carolina Courage

== Player representation ==
=== By club ===
Clubs with 3 or more players represented are listed.

Players	Club
8	(England) Manchester City, (Japan) Nippon TV Beleza
7	(United States) North Carolina Courage
5	(United States) Orlando Pride
4	(Japan) INAC Kobe Leonessa, (United States) Chicago Red Stars
3	(Brazil) Corinthians, (England) Chelsea, (France) Lyon, (United States) Portland Thorns, (United States) Utah Royals, (United States) Washington Spirit

=== By club nationality ===
Players	Clubs
30	United States
19	Japan
16	England
7	Spain
6	Brazil
5	France
3	South Korea
2	Germany, Portugal
1	Denmark, Italy

=== By club federation ===
Players	Federation
34	UEFA
30	CONCACAF
22	AFC
6	CONMEBOL

=== By representatives of domestic league ===
National squad	Players
United States	23
Japan	19
England	16
Brazil	6
