= Rikako Kobayashi =

Japanese footballer (born 1997)

Rikako Kobayashi 小林 里歌子
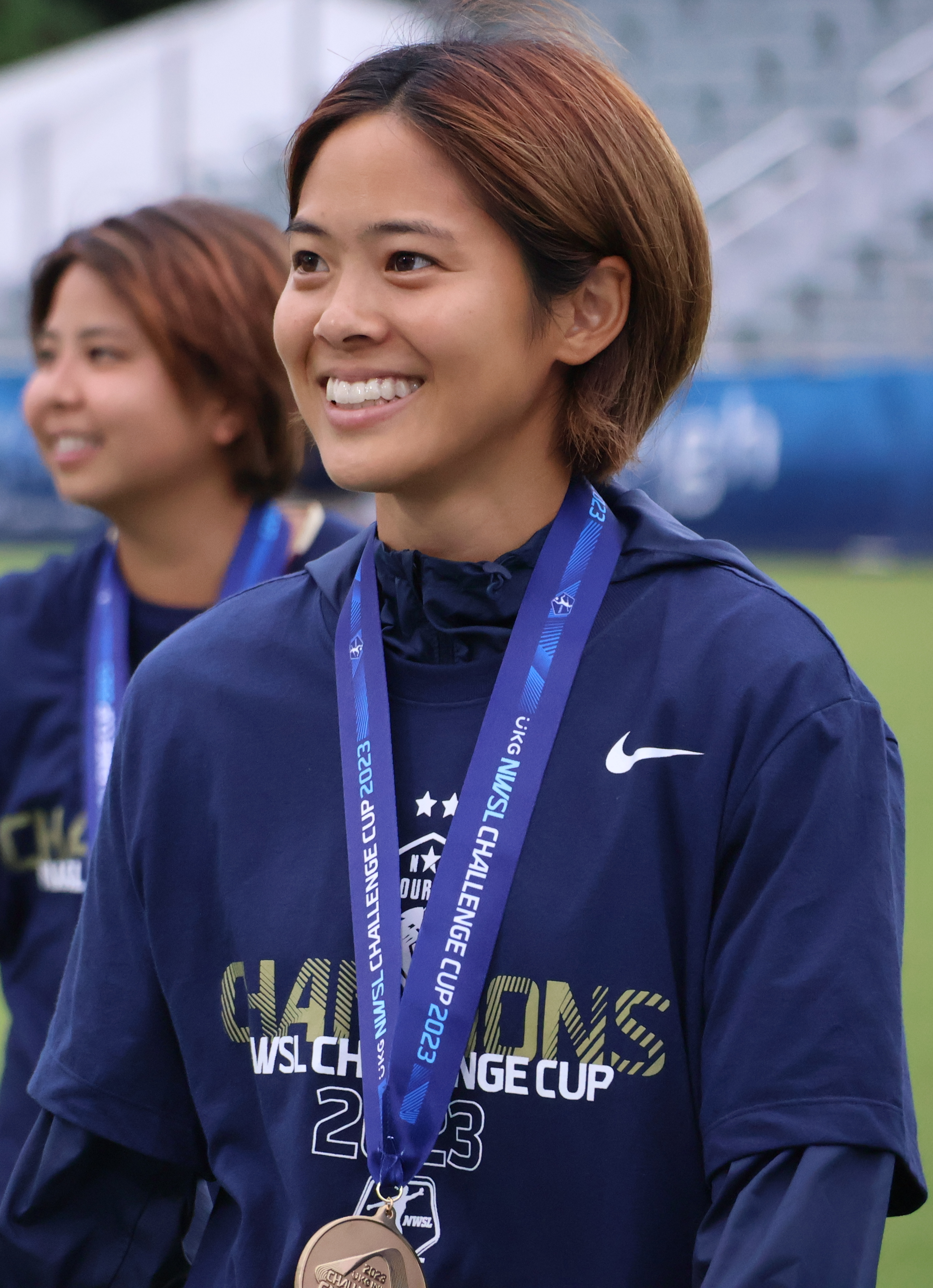
- Kobayashi with the North Carolina Courage in 2023

Personal information
- Full name: Rikako Kobayashi
- Date of birth: 21 July 1997 (age 29)
- Place of birth: Kobe, Hyogo, Japan
- Height: 1.60 m (5 ft 3 in)
- Position: Forward

Team information
- Current team: Tokyo Verdy Beleza
- Number: 20

Youth career
- 2013–2015: Tokiwagi Gakuen High School LSC

Senior career*
Years	Team	Apps	(Gls)
2016–2023	Tokyo Verdy Beleza	72	(36)
2023–2024	North Carolina Courage	0	(0)
2024–	Tokyo Verdy Beleza		
Total		25	(22)

International career^{‡}
2014	Japan U-17	5	(2)
2019–	Japan	16	(4)
Medal record
Nippon TV Beleza
Winner	Nadeshiko League	2016
Winner	Nadeshiko League	2017
Winner	Nadeshiko League	2018
Winner	Nadeshiko League Cup	2016
Winner	Nadeshiko League Cup	2018
Winner	Empress's Cup	2017
Winner	Empress's Cup	2018
Representing Japan
AFC U-19 Women's Championship
Gold medal – first place	2015 China
FIFA U-17 Women's World Cup
Gold medal – first place	2014 Costa Rica
AFC U-16 Women's Championship
Gold medal – first place	2013 China
- * Club domestic league appearances and goals as of March 21, 2024 ‡ National team caps and goals as of December 17, 2019

Rikako Kobayashi (小林 里歌子, Kobayashi Rikako; born 21 July 1997) is a Japanese professional football player who plays as a midfielder for Tokyo Verdy Beleza the Japan national team. She is the sister of footballer Seigo Kobayashi.

== Club career ==
Kobayashi was born in Hyogo Prefecture on 21 July 1997. She attended and played for Tokiwagi Gakuen High School, which competed in the second-division Challenge League. She led Tokiwagi Gakuen, the only high school competing in senior league competition at the time, to its first and only third-division Challenge League championship in 2015 as the league's top scorer and most valuable player. She also won the 2015 AFC young player of the year award.

She joined L.League club Nippon TV Tokyo Verdy Beleza in 2016. However, she could not play in her first two seasons due to injury and debuted in the 2018 season.

On 17 July 2023, North Carolina Courage of the American National Women's Soccer League announced their signing of Kobayashi for a two-year contract through the 2024 NWSL season, with an option for an additional year. After failing to make a professional appearance for North Carolina due to injury, the club and Kobayashi mutually agreed to terminate her contract on 21 March 2024.

== National team career ==
In 2013, Kobayashi was selected in the Japan U-16 national team for 2013 AFC U-16 Championship. She scored 7 goals and became a top scorer. Japan team also won the championship. In 2014, Kobayashi was selected in Japan U-17 national team for 2014 U-17 World Cup. She played 5 matches and scored 2 goals, and Japan won the championship.

In 2015, Kobayashi was selected Japan U-19 national team for 2015 AFC U-19 Championship. Japan won the championship and she was selected Best players award. Although Japan qualified for the 2016 U-20 World Cup, she was not selected to the Japan team for the tournament due to injury.

In February 2019, Kobayashi was selected Japan national team for SheBelieves Cup. At this tournament, on 27 February, she debuted against United States.

== Career statistics ==
=== Club ===
As of match played 10 June 2023

Appearances and goals by club, season and competition
Club	Season	League			National Cup (Note: Includes Empress's Cup)		League Cup (Note: Includes Nadeshiko League Cup, NWSL Challenge Cup)		Continental (Note: Includes AFC Women's Club Championship)		Total	
Club	Season	Division	Apps	Goals	Apps	Goals	Apps	Goals	Apps	Goals	Apps	Goals
Nippon TV Beleza	2016	Nadeshiko League	0	0	0	0	0	0	—		0	0
Nippon TV Beleza	2017	Nadeshiko League	0	0	0	0	0	0	—		0	0
Nippon TV Beleza	2018	Nadeshiko League	15	3	5	1	9	1	—		29	5
Nippon TV Beleza	2019	Nadeshiko League	16	11	5	5	2	0	2	1	23	16
Nippon TV Beleza	2020	Nadeshiko League	14	13	5	6	—		—		19	19
Nippon TV Beleza	2021–22	WE League	9	3	2	1	—		—		11	4
Nippon TV Beleza	2022–23	WE League	18	6	4	2	0	0	—		22	8
Nippon TV Beleza	Total		72	36	21	15	11	1	2	1	106	53
North Carolina Courage	2023	NWSL	0	0	—		0	0	—		0	0
Career Total			72	36	21	15	11	1	2	1	106	53

=== International ===
As of match played 23 February 2023

Appearances and goals by national team and year
National team	Year	Apps	Goals
Japan	2019	12	4
Japan	2020	0	0
Japan	2021	2	0
Japan	2022	0	0
Japan	2023	2	0
Total		16	4

Scores and results list Japan's goal tally first, score column indicates score after each Kobayashi goal.

List of international goals scored by Rikako Kobayashi
No.	Date	Venue	Opponent	Score	Result	Competition
1.	3 March 2019	Nissan Stadium, Nashville, United States	Brazil	2–1	3–1	2019 SheBelieves Cup
2.	4 April 2019	Stade de l'Abbé-Deschamps, Auxerre, France	France	1–1	1–3	Friendly
3.	6 October 2019	IAI Stadium Nihondaira, Shizuoka, Japan	Canada	4–0	4–0	Friendly
4.	11 December 2019	Busan Asiad Main Stadium, Busan, South Korea	Chinese Taipei	3–0	9–0	2019 EAFF E-1 Football Championship

== Honours ==
Tokyo Verdy Beleza

- Nadeshiko League: 2016, 2017, 2018, 2019
- Empress's Cup: 2017, 2018, 2019, 2020, 2022
- Nadeshiko League Cup: 2016, 2018, 2019
- AFC Women's Club Championship: 2019

Individual

- WE League Outstanding Players Award: 2022–23
