= Yui Hasegawa =

Japanese footballer (born 1997)

Yui Hasegawa 長谷川 唯
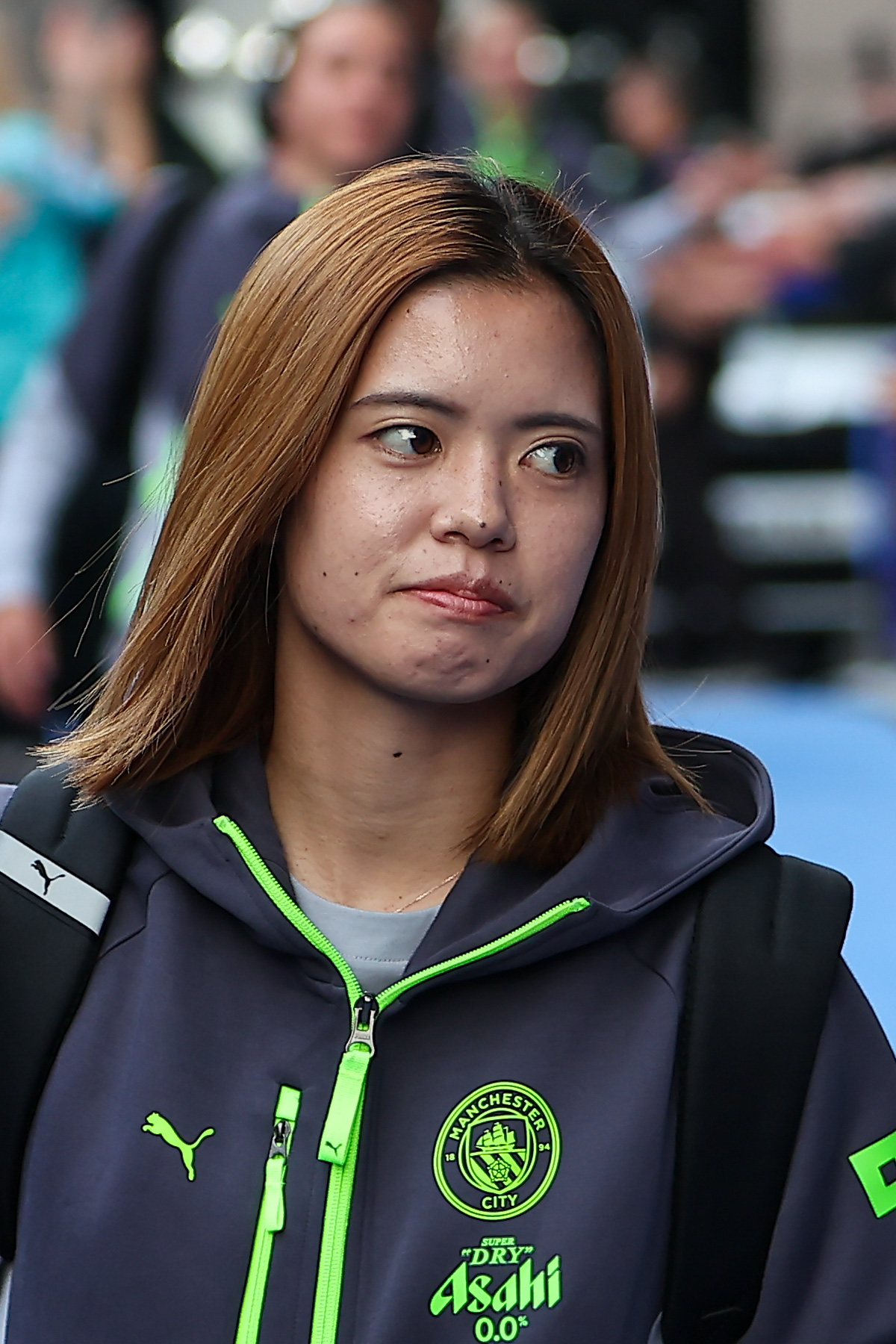
- Hasegawa in 2025

Personal information
- Date of birth: January 29, 1997 (age 29)
- Place of birth: Sendai, Miyagi, Japan
- Height: 1.57 m (5 ft 2 in)
- Position: Midfielder

Team information
- Current team: Manchester City
- Number: 25

Youth career
- 2009–2012: Tokyo Verdy Beleza

Senior career*
Years	Team	Apps	(Gls)
2013–2021	Tokyo Verdy Beleza	148	(19)
2021	Milan	9	(3)
2021–2022	West Ham United	17	(2)
2022–	Manchester City	95	(3)

International career^{‡}
2012–2014	Japan U17	17	(10)
2016	Japan U20	19	(7)
2017–	Japan	108	(21)
Medal record
Women's football
Representing Japan
AFC Women's Asian Cup
Winner	2018 Jordan
Winner	2026 Australia
Asian Games
Gold medal – first place	2018 Jakarta-Palembang	Team
FIFA U-20 Women's World Cup
Bronze medal – third place	2016 Papua New Guinea
AFC U-19 Women's Championship
Winner	2015 China
FIFA U-17 Women's World Cup
Winner	2014 Costa Rica
- * Club domestic league appearances and goals as of 22:20, 22 November 2026 (UTC) ‡ National team caps and goals as of 06:48, 14 October 2026 (UTC)

Yui Hasegawa (長谷川 唯, Hasegawa Yui; IPA: [haseɡaɰa jɯ.i]; born 29 January 1997) is a Japanese professional footballer who plays as a midfielder for Women's Super League club Manchester City and captains the Japan national team. Considered as one of the best defensive midfielders in the world, she has the versatility to operate across the midfield in both offensive and defensive positions.

Born in Sendai, Miyagi Prefecture and brought up in Toda, Saitama, Hasegawa played youth football with Tokyo Verdy Beleza before she began her career with the senior team in 2013. In 2021, Hasegawa joined AC Milan before moving to West Ham United at the end of 2020-21 Serie A season. She joined Manchester City in the summer of 2022 after spending one season with West Ham United.

A full international since 2017, Hasegawa has represented Japan in the 2019 and 2023 FIFA World Cup, the 2020 and 2024 Olympics, as well as the 2018, 2022, and 2026 AFC Asian Cup. As of March 2025, she had scored 20 goals and earned over 100 caps for Japan.

== Early life ==
Hasegawa was born in Sendai, Miyagi Prefecture on January 29, 1997. She subsequently moved to Toda, Saitama with her family during her childhood. She attended high school at Hinode High School (now Meguro Nihon University High School). She graduated from Nihon University in 2019.

Hasegawa began playing football in kindergarten at the age of six under the influence of her older brothers, and initially played amongst boys before joining a girls' football club around the age of nine. In 2009, aged 11, she was accepted into Menina, the nation's top youth academy of the club, she would later play for Tokyo Verdy Beleza. She would regularly travel by train from her home in Saitama to Tokyo daily after school for team practice before returning home late at night. Over a four-year period from 2011 to 2014, she was a central figure behind Menina's successive titles at the JFA U-18 All Japan Youth Women's Football Tournaments. While at the academy, she befriended and rose through the ranks with fellow players such as Risa Shimizu and Yuka Momiki, all of whom would go on play for the Japan national team together.

== Club career ==
=== Tokyo Verdy Beleza ===
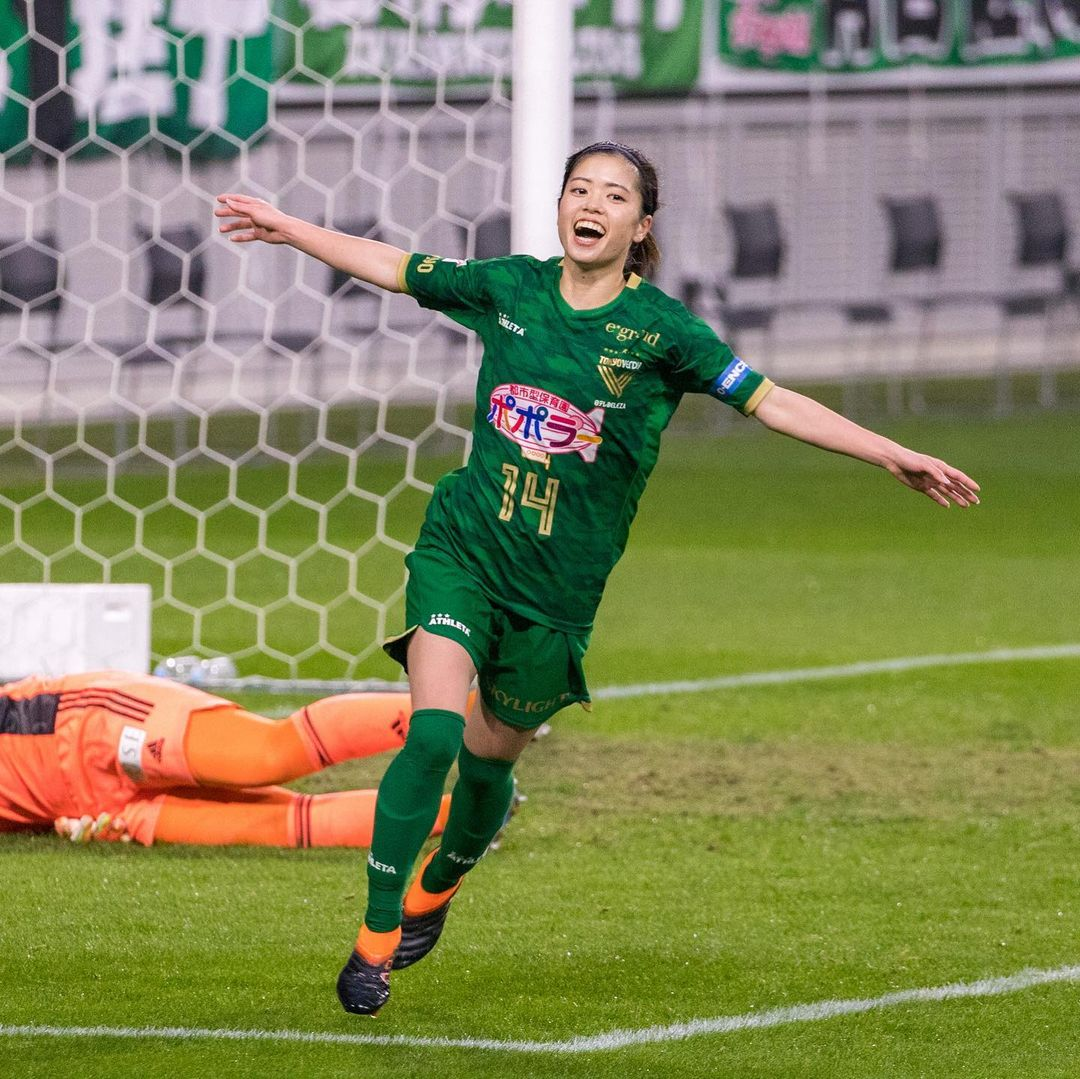
Hasegawa celebrates after scoring a goal for Beleza in the Empress's Cup semi-final in December 2020

Having progressed through the youth set-up of Tokyo Verdy Beleza, Hasegawa was promoted to the senior team in 2013. She made her Nadeshiko League debut on March 23, 2013, as a sixteen-year-old, against FC Kibi IU Charme. Despite her young age and relative inexperience in the first team, she quickly established herself as a regular starter in midfield, amongst other more accomplished senior teammates in the Japan national team at the time.

The 2015 season proved to be a breakout year for her in senior football. She scored her first league goal in the Nadeshiko League against Iga FC Kunoichi on September 23, 2015, and played a key part in leading the team to win the championship that year, ending a five-year drought for the domestic title. Hasegawa's time with the club coincided with one of the most successful periods for the club. During her eight seasons with Beleza, she won multiple trophies with Beleza; including five successive league titles, five Empress's Cup, three League Cup, and the inaugural AFC Women's Club Championship. She won the domestic triple crown twice with Beleza, having done so consecutively in the 2018 and 2019 season.

Hasegawa was first selected to the Nadeshiko League Best XI in the 2017 season. She would repeated that feat again in 2018, 2019, and 2020, until she left Japan to play overseas in 2021.

At the age of 21, she reached the milestone of 100 league appearances for Beleza on May 3, 2018, in a scoreless draw against Nojima Stella Kanagawa. In total, she made 217 appearances and scored 40 goals for the club .

=== AC Milan ===
On January 29, 2021, it was announced that Hasegawa would join Serie A Femminile club AC Milan. She netted a brace in her competitive debut for Milan in a 6–1 victory over Pink Bari on February 27, 2021, including one direct free-kick She was also awarded Player of the Match in that game. In half a season in Italy, Hasegawa helped AC Milan finish runner-up in the league to qualify for the UEFA Champions League 1st round and reached the 2020–21 Coppa Italia final. In total, she featured in nine games and scored three goals for the club.

=== West Ham United ===
In August 2021, Hasegawa signed a two-year contract with English side West Ham United. She scored her first goal for the club's first ever victory over Manchester City in the Women's Super League, assisting the first and scoring the second in their 2–0 win on October 3, 2021. She scored again for West Ham in a 2–1 victory over Reading on April 24, 2022. Both of these goals from Hasegawa won the WSL Goal of the Month awards, with the latter being nominated for the league's Goal of the Season as well. In her first season with the Hammers, Hasegawa helped West Ham achieve sixth-place, their best ever finish in the league thus far, and reached the Women's FA Cup semi-finals.

=== Manchester City ===
On September 8, 2022, Hasegawa signed a three-year deal with fellow Women's Super League side Manchester City. Her arrival at the club coincided with a mass squad turnover, which saw the departure of several key players through transfers and retirements. While at Manchester City, she began playing as a defensive midfielder under manager Gareth Taylor, filling the gap left behind by Keira Walsh following her departure to FC Barcelona. Hasegawa quickly established herself as a key player in the starting line-up as she helped spark a 16-game unbeaten run in all competitions since joining the club. She scored her first goal for the club in their 4–0 win against Leicester City on October 16, 2022. A string of good performances in January 2023 saw her nominated for January's WSL Player of the Month award. She would end her season playing the third most minutes in the league for Manchester City (1,783), only behind Khadija Shaw and Alex Greenwood. In her first season with the club, Hasegawa helped Manchester City finish fourth in the league, as well as reaching the semi-finals of the FA Women's League Cup. She was named in the 2022/23 PFA WSL Team of the Year at the end of the season. On September 7, she was nominated as one of 30 candidates for the Ballon d'Or.

Hasegawa retained her place in the starting eleven in the 2023–24 season, playing in all but one game in all competition for Manchester City. She played a crucial role in the team's season performance as they finished 2nd in the league, which includes a record breaking 13 successive win in the league. She would score her only goal of the season in a 1–0 quarterfinals win over Tottenham Hotspur in the FA Women's League Cup. On January 23, 2023, Hasegawa signed a contract extension that keeps her at Manchester City until 2027. She was shortlisted for the 2023/24 PFA Player of the Year award and named in the 2023/24 PFA WSL Team of the Year at the end of the season for her season performance. On September 4, 2024, she was nominated again as one of 30 candidates for the Ballon d'Or Féminin.

During the 2024–25 season, Hasegawa would feature in the UEFA Champions League for the first time in her career as Manchester City qualified for the competition proper after defeating Paris FC in the qualifying round. She went on to start in all but one match for the team in all competition as Manchester City would advance to the Women's League Cup final, her first final since arrived in Europe. On 15 March 2025, during the Women's League Cup final against Chelsea, Hasegawa conceded an own goal, when trying to clear the ball, which led to their 2-1 defeat. At the end of the season, she was voted Manchester City's Player of the Season and named to the PFA WSL Team of the Year for the 3rd consecutive year. She was also shortlisted again for the PFA Player of the Year.

On 4 September 2025, Hasegawa signed an additional 2-year contract extension on her current which will keep her with the club until 2029. In the first home game of the 2025–26 season, Hasegawa scored the winning goal in the 2–1 victory over Brighton. On 28 September 2025, she made her 100th competitive appearance for Manchester City in a league match win against London City Lionnesses.

== International career ==
=== Youth ===
Hasegawa has been featured throughout all youth levels of the Japan national team set-up, since she was first called up to the U-17 national team in 2011 at the age of 14.

She began her international career as a 15-year-old at the 2012 FIFA U-17 World Cup in Azerbaijan, where she started in two matches against Brazil in the group stage and Ghana in the quarter-final. Japan were knocked out in the 1–0 quarter-final defeat, and Hasegawa ended her first international tournament with 2 goals, from a brace against New Zealand.

The following year, her development was accelerated yet again as she was called up to the U-20 national team to participate in the 2013 AFC U-19 Championship despite still being 16.

As the U-20 squad had failed to qualify for the 2014 FIFA U-20 World Cup that year, Hasegawa returned to her original age group to play in the 2014 FIFA U-17 World Cup in Costa Rica. She started all six matches in Japan's remarkable run that saw them emerge as the champions. A cornerstone of Japan's attack, she scored three goals against Paraguay, New Zealand and Mexico, as she went on to receive the individual honour of the adidas Silver Ball – the second best player of the tournament – behind teammate Hina Sugita who won the Golden Ball.

=== Senior ===
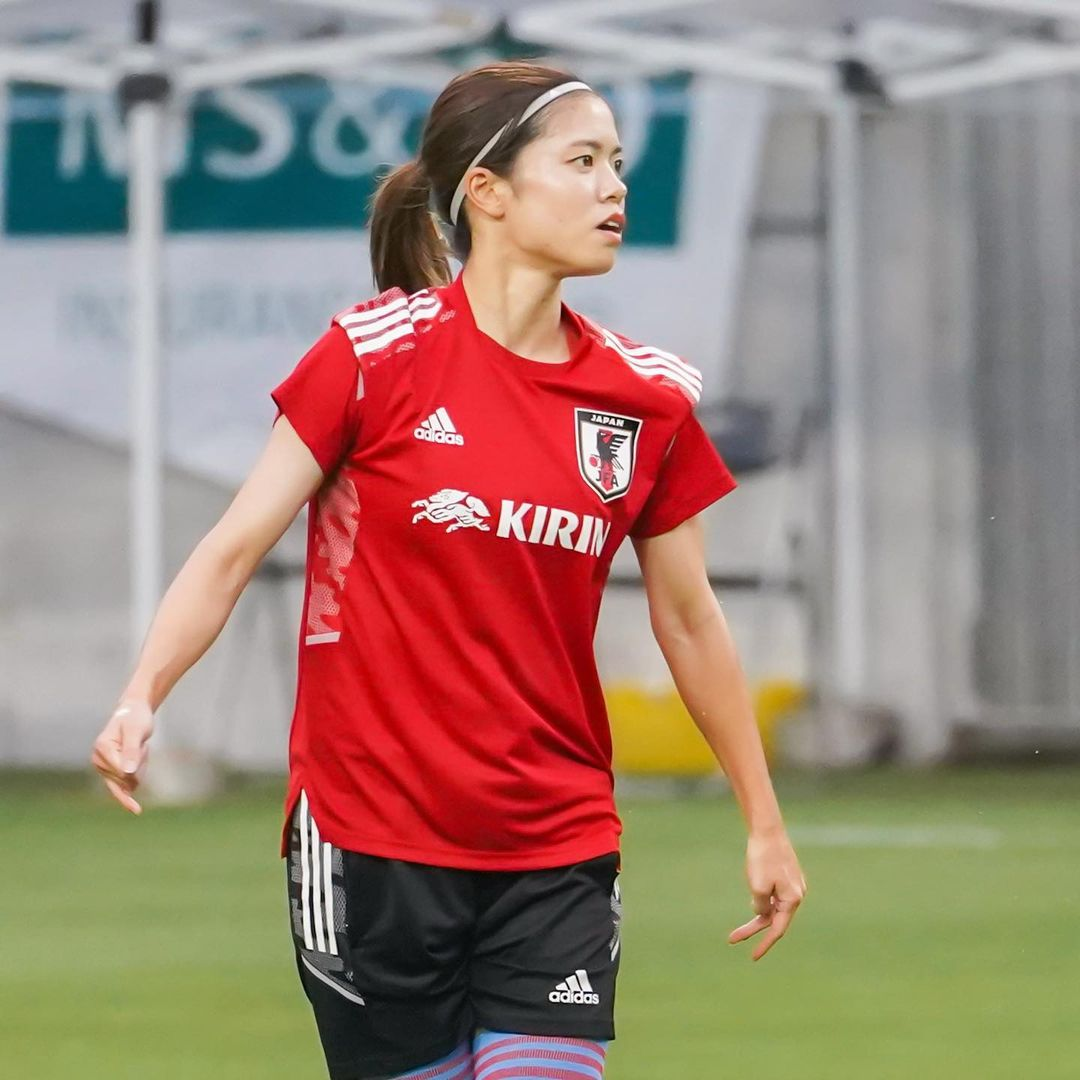
Hasegawa warming up prior to a friendly match with Australia in April 2021

On March 1, 2017, Hasegawa won her first senior cap for the Japan national team when she made her debut as a half-time substitute against Spain at the 2017 Algarve Cup. In the following match, she scored her first international goals at senior level, netting twice in Japan's 2–0 win over Iceland.

She was also part of Japan's squad as they defended their Asian Cup title, during the 2018 AFC Asian Cup in Jordan. She provided the assist for Kumi Yokoyama's crucial winning goal that saw Japan lift the trophy, beating regional rivals Australia by a 1–0 scoreline for the second consecutive time. In the same year, she won a gold medal at the 2018 Asian Games, where Japan emerged champions of yet another closely contested final, to win 1–0 over China.

Hasegawa participated in her first World Cup competition at the 2019 FIFA World Cup in France. She was part of a new generation of Nadeshiko stars, as the Japan senior team was in a period of transition, moving on from many of the players who featured in the squad that reached the previous World Cup final, and had lifted the historic title in 2011. Despite Japan's exit to the Netherlands in the Round of 16, Hasegawa's equaliser in that match was nominated for Goal of the Tournament.

In July 2021, Hasegawa took part in the 2020 Summer Olympics held in her home country of Japan. She started in all four of Japan's matches and provided two assists as Japan was eliminated from the competition in the quarter-final, where they lost 3–1 to eventual silver medalists Sweden.

On 13 June 2023, Hasegawa was included in the 23-player squad for the FIFA World Cup 2023. She played a pivotal role in Japan's performance in the tournament. She started in all but one game as they finished top of their group and reached the quarterfinals in the world cup.

On 14 June 2024, Hasegawa was included in the Japan squad for the 2024 Summer Olympics.

Hasegawa was part of the Japan squad that won the 2025 SheBelieves Cup. She was appointed the captain of the Japan national team by head coach Nils Nielsen on 30 May 2025 prior to their friendly match against Brazil. She was called up to the national team for the 2026 AFC Asian Cup. She started all six matches for Japan as she led the team to their third continental title, winning all matches in the process. She made her 100th senior international appearance for Japan in their 7–0 win over Philippines in the quarter-finals.

== Style of play ==
Primarily a defensive midfielder, Hasegawa began her career as an attacking midfielder in Japan. She is known for her composure on the ball, passing vision, football intelligence and her ball-winning ability.

Early in her career playing with Nippon TV Tokyo Verdy Beleza, she most often operated as a left wide midfielder in a 4-3-3 formation, although her versatility allows her to occupy many positions in midfield. Hasegawa is described as a player who possesses exceptional ability on the ball. Her quick feet, acceleration and low centre of gravity make her an adept dribbler and press resistant. She possesses a wide variety of passes in her arsenal, and when combined with her passing range and ball-carrying capability, she has earned her rank among the best players in her position in terms of ball progression. She possesses a keen tactical awareness and sense of positioning which makes her a penetration threat with or without the ball. Hasegawa is also an effective player on the defensive end where her intense counter pressing in the final third regularly helps her side to quickly regain possession through intercepting opposition play.

Since joining Manchester City, Hasegawa has primarily operated as a defensive midfielder where she dictates and controls match tempo from deep while providing defensive cover for the defensive line. In her first season in the new position, she consistently ranked high in the defensive metrics such as interception, ball won back in the middle third, and ball recoveries. She also possessed a strong ability to kickstart the attacking sequence after winning back possession. She is similarly comfortable in playing through the opposition pressure as she ranked second in pass completion rate (88.6%) among players with 1,000+ passes attempted in the 2022–23 season.

== Career statistics ==
=== Club ===
As of match played 22 November 2026

Appearances and goals by club, season and competition
Club	Season	League			National cup (Note: Includes Empress's Cup, Coppa Italia, Women's FA Cup)		League cup (Note: Includes Nadeshiko League Cup, Women's League Cup)		Continental		Total	
Club	Season	Division	Apps	Goals	Apps	Goals	Apps	Goals	Apps	Goals	Apps	Goals
Tokyo Verdy Beleza	2013	Nadeshiko League	17	0	2	0	8	2	—		27	2
Tokyo Verdy Beleza	2014	Nadeshiko League	21	0	4	3	—		—		25	3
Tokyo Verdy Beleza	2015	Nadeshiko League	22	3	4	1	—		—		26	4
Tokyo Verdy Beleza	2016	Nadeshiko League	18	2	4	3	10	3	—		32	8
Tokyo Verdy Beleza	2017	Nadeshiko League	18	3	5	1	6	1	—		29	5
Tokyo Verdy Beleza	2018	Nadeshiko League	18	3	5	1	5	3	—		28	7
Tokyo Verdy Beleza	2019	Nadeshiko League	16	1	5	2	3	1	3 (Note: Appearance(s) in AFC Women's Club Championship)	0	27	4
Tokyo Verdy Beleza	2020	Nadeshiko League	18	7	5	0	—		—		23	7
Tokyo Verdy Beleza	Total		148	19	34	11	32	10	3	0	217	40
A.C. Milan	2020–21	Serie A	9	3	4	0	—		—		13	3
West Ham United	2021–22	Women's Super League	17	2	3	0	3	0	—		23	2
Manchester City	2022–23	Women's Super League	20	1	2	0	5	0	—		27	1
Manchester City	2023–24	Women's Super League	22	0	3	0	5	1	—		30	1
Manchester City	2024–25	Women's Super League	22	0	3	0	3	0	10 (Note: Appearance(s) in UEFA Women's Champions League)	0	38	0
Manchester City	2025–26	Women's Super League	20	2	4	0	5	2	—		29	4
Manchester City	2026–27	Women's Super League	11	0	0	0	—		5	0	16	0
Manchester City	Total		95	3	12	0	18	3	15	0	140	6
Career Total			269	27	53	11	53	13	18	0	393	51

=== International ===
As of match played 13 October 2026

Appearances and goals by national team and year
National team	Year	Apps	Goals
Japan	2017	13	2
Japan	2018	17	2
Japan	2019	12	4
Japan	2020	0	0
Japan	2021	10	1
Japan	2022	8	3
Japan	2023	17	6
Japan	2024	12	0
Japan	2025	6	1
Japan	2026	13	2
Total		108	21

Scores and results list Japan's goal tally first, score column indicates score after each Hasegawa goal.

List of international goals scored by Yui Hasegawa
No.	Date	Venue	Opponent	Score	Result	Competition	Ref.
1	3 March 2017	Bela Vista Municipal Stadium, Parchal, Portugal	Iceland	1–0	2–0	2017 Algarve Cup	
2	3 March 2017	Bela Vista Municipal Stadium, Parchal, Portugal	Iceland	2–0	2–0	2017 Algarve Cup	
3	5 March 2018	Estádio Algarve, Almancil, Portugal	Denmark	1–0	2–0	2018 Algarve Cup	
4	25 August 2018	Gelora Sriwijaya Stadium, Palembang, Indonesia	North Korea	2–0	2–1	2018 Asian Games	
5	3 March 2019	Nissan Stadium, Nashville, United States	Brazil	3–1	3–1	2019 SheBelieves Cup	
6	9 April 2019	Benteler-Arena, Paderborn, Germany	Germany	2–1	2–2	Friendly	
7	25 June 2019	Roazhon Park, Rennes, France	Netherlands	1–1	1–2	2019 FIFA Women's World Cup	
8	6 October 2019	IAI Stadium Nihondaira, Shizuoka, Japan	Canada	3–0	4–0	Friendly	
9	11 April 2021	Japan National Stadium, Tokyo, Japan	Panama	3–0	7–0	Friendly	
10	21 January 2022	Shree Shiv Chhatrapati Sports Complex, Pune, India	Myanmar	2–0	5–0	2022 AFC Women's Asian Cup	
11	21 January 2022	Shree Shiv Chhatrapati Sports Complex, Pune, India	Myanmar	5–0	5–0	2022 AFC Women's Asian Cup	
12	27 June 2022	Veritas Stadion, Turku, Finland	Finland	5–1	5–1	Friendly	
13	22 February 2023	Toyota Stadium, Frisco, United States	Canada	2–0	3–0	2023 SheBelieves Cup	
14	7 April 2023	Estádio D. Afonso Henriques, Guimarães, Portugal	Portugal	1–1	2–1	Friendly	
15	14 July 2023	Yurtec Stadium Sendai, Sendai, Japan	Panama	2–0	5–0	Friendly	
16	14 July 2023	Yurtec Stadium Sendai, Sendai, Japan	Panama	4–0	5–0	Friendly	
17	23 September 2023	Kitakyushu Stadium, Kitakyushu, Japan	Argentina	2–0	8–0	Friendly	
18	23 September 2023	Kitakyushu Stadium, Kitakyushu, Japan	Argentina	4–0	8–0	Friendly	
19	24 October 2025	Stadio Giuseppe Sinigaglia, Como, Italy	Italy	1–1	1–1	Friendly	
20	7 March 2026	Perth Rectangular Stadium, Perth, Australia	India	2–0	11–0	2026 AFC Women's Asian Cup	
21	9 October 2026	Stade Bauer, Saint-Ouen-sur-Seine, France	Haiti	3–0	5–1	Friendly	

== Honours ==
Tokyo Verdy Beleza

- Nadeshiko League: 2015, 2016, 2017, 2018, 2019
- Nadeshiko League Cup: 2016, 2018, 2019
- Empress's Cup: 2014, 2017, 2018, 2019, 2020
- AFC Women's Club Championship: 2019

AC Milan

- Coppa Italia runner-up: 2020–21

Manchester City

- Women's Super League: 2025–26
- Women's FA Cup: 2025–26

Japan U17

- FIFA U-17 Women's World Cup: 2014

Japan

- AFC Women's Asian Cup: 2018, 2026
- Asian Games: 2018
- EAFF Women's Football Championship: 2019
- SheBelieves Cup: 2025

Individual

- Nadeshiko League Best Eleven: 2017, 2018, 2019, 2020
- FIFA U-17 Women's World Cup Silver Ball: 2014
- FA Women's Super League Goal of the Month: April 2022
- PFA Team of the Year: 2022–23, 2023–24, 2024–25, 2025–26
- Manchester City Player of the Year: 2024–25

== Published works ==
- Hasegawa, Yui (2026). ＳＭＩＬＥ わたしを笑顔にする４０の思考と習慣. Tokyo: 徳間書店 Tokuma Shoten. ISBN 9784198662318.
