= Yu Nakasato =

Japanese footballer

Yu Nakasato 中里 優
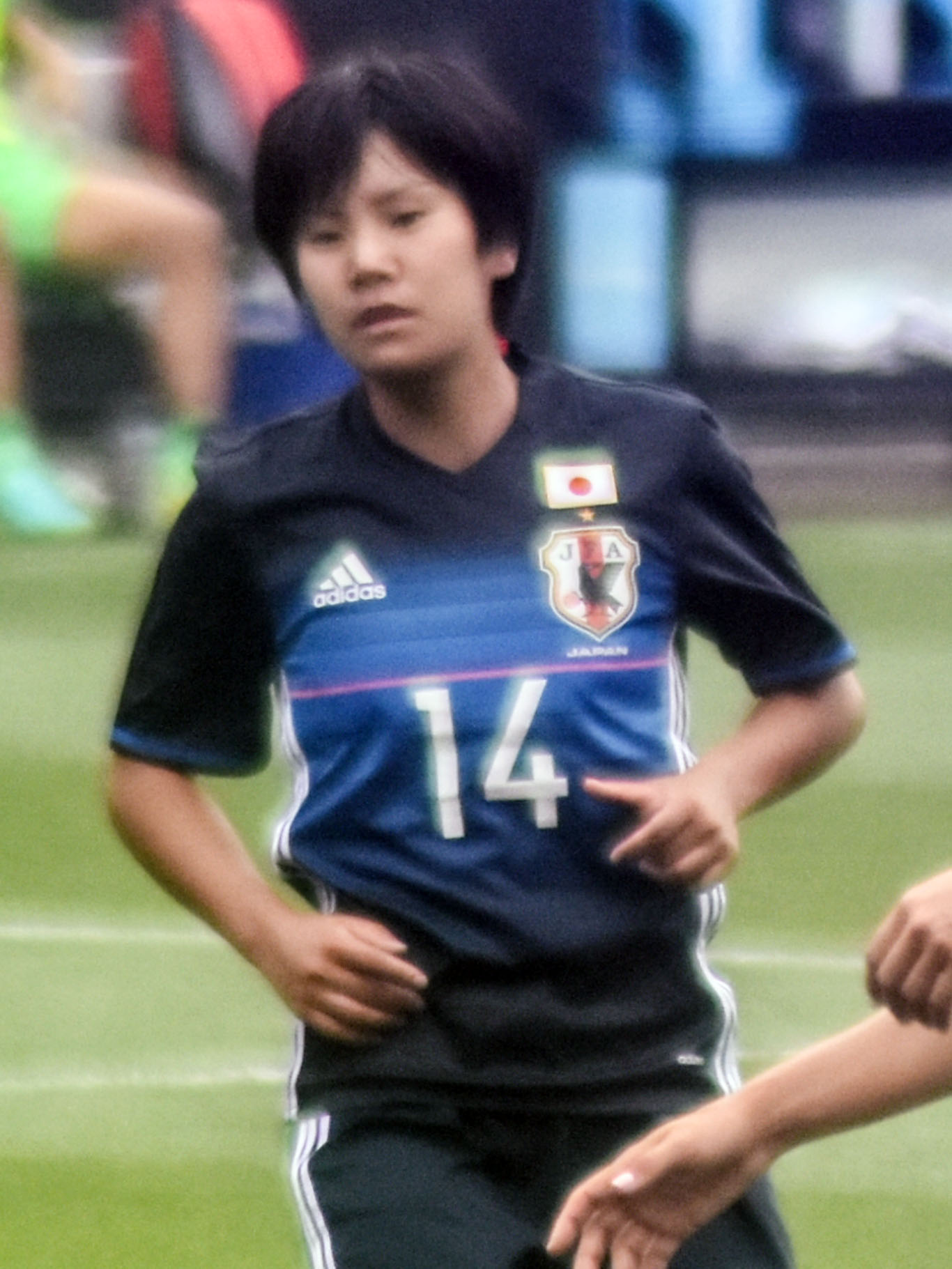

Personal information
- Full name: Yu Nakasato
- Date of birth: July 14, 1994 (age 32)
- Place of birth: Fuchu, Tokyo, Japan
- Height: 1.48 m (4 ft 10 1/2 in)
- Position: Midfielder

Team information
- Current team: Tokyo Verdy Beleza
- Number: 7

Youth career
- 2007–2010: Tokyo Verdy Beleza

Senior career*
| Years | Team | Apps | (Gls) |
| 2011– | Tokyo Verdy Beleza | 102 | (16) |
| Total | | 102 | (16) |

International career
| 2012 | Japan U-20 | 1 | (0) |
| 2016–2018 | Japan | 20 | (0) |
Medal record
Nippon TV Beleza
| Winner | Nadeshiko League | 2015 |
| Winner | Nadeshiko League | 2016 |
| Winner | Nadeshiko League | 2017 |
| Winner | Nadeshiko League | 2018 |
| Runner-up | Nadeshiko League | 2011 |
| Runner-up | Nadeshiko League | 2012 |
| Runner-up | Nadeshiko League | 2013 |
| Runner-up | Nadeshiko League | 2014 |
| Winner | Nadeshiko League Cup | 2012 |
| Winner | Nadeshiko League Cup | 2016 |
| Winner | Nadeshiko League Cup | 2018 |
| Winner | Empress's Cup | 2014 |
| Winner | Empress's Cup | 2017 |
| Winner | Empress's Cup | 2018 |
Representing Japan
Asian Games
| Gold medal – first place | 2018 Jakarta-Palembang | Team |
FIFA U-20 Women's World Cup
| Bronze medal – third place | 2012 Japan |
- * Club domestic league appearances and goals as of December 31, 2018

Yu Nakasato (中里 優, Nakasato Yū; born July 14, 1994) is a Japanese footballer who plays as a midfielder. She plays for Tokyo Verdy Beleza and the Japan national team.

== Club career ==
Nakasato was born in Fuchu on July 14, 1994. In 2011, she joined Nippon TV Beleza from youth team. She was selected Best Eleven in 2017 season.

== National team career ==
In August 2012, Nakasato was selected for Japan U-20 national team for 2012 U-20 World Cup and Japan won 3rd place. On June 2, 2016, she debuted for Japan national team against United States. She played 20 games for Japan until 2018.

== National team statistics ==
Japan national team
| Year | Apps | Goals |
|---|---|---|
| 2016 | 3 | 0 |
| 2017 | 13 | 0 |
| 2018 | 4 | 0 |
| Total | 20 | 0 |
