= Tomoko Muramatsu =

Japanese footballer

Tomoko Muramatsu 村松 智子
Personal information
- Full name: Tomoko Muramatsu
- Date of birth: October 23, 1994 (age 32)
- Place of birth: Setagaya, Tokyo, Japan
- Height: 1.62 m (5 ft 4 in)
- Position: Defender

Team information
- Current team: Tokyo Verdy Beleza
- Number: 3

Youth career
- 2007–2010: Tokyo Verdy Beleza

Senior career*
Years	Team	Apps	(Gls)
2011–	Tokyo Verdy Beleza	80	(1)
Total		68	(1)

International career
2010	Japan U-17	5	(0)
2015–2016	Japan	4	(0)
Medal record
Nippon TV Beleza
Winner	Nadeshiko League	2015
Winner	Nadeshiko League	2016
Winner	Nadeshiko League	2017
Winner	Nadeshiko League	2018
Runner-up	Nadeshiko League	2011
Runner-up	Nadeshiko League	2012
Runner-up	Nadeshiko League	2013
Runner-up	Nadeshiko League	2014
Winner	Nadeshiko League Cup	2012
Winner	Nadeshiko League Cup	2016
Winner	Nadeshiko League Cup	2018
Winner	Empress's Cup	2014
Winner	Empress's Cup	2017
Winner	Empress's Cup	2018
Representing Japan
FIFA U-17 Women's World Cup
Silver medal – second place	2010 Trinidad and Tobago
AFC U-16 Women's Championship
Bronze medal – third place	2009 Thailand
- * Club domestic league appearances and goals as of December 31, 2018

Tomoko Muramatsu (村松 智子, Muramatsu Tomoko; born October 23, 1994) is a Japanese footballer who plays as a defender. She plays for Tokyo Verdy Beleza in the WE League and has also played for the Japan national team.

== Club career ==
Muramatsu was born in Setagaya, Tokyo on October 23, 1994. She was promoted to Nippon TV Beleza from youth team in 2011. She was selected Best Eleven in 2015 and 2016.

== National team career ==
In 2010, Muramatsu was selected Japan U-17 national team for 2010 U-17 World Cup. She played 5 games and Japan won 2nd place. In August 2015, she was selected Japan national team for 2015 East Asian Cup. At this competition, on August 4, she debuted against South Korea. She played 4 games for Japan until 2016.

== National team statistics ==
Japan national team
Year	Apps	Goals
2015	2	0
2016	2	0
Total	4	0
