= Saori Ariyoshi =

Japanese footballer (born 1987)

Saori Ariyoshi 有吉 佐織
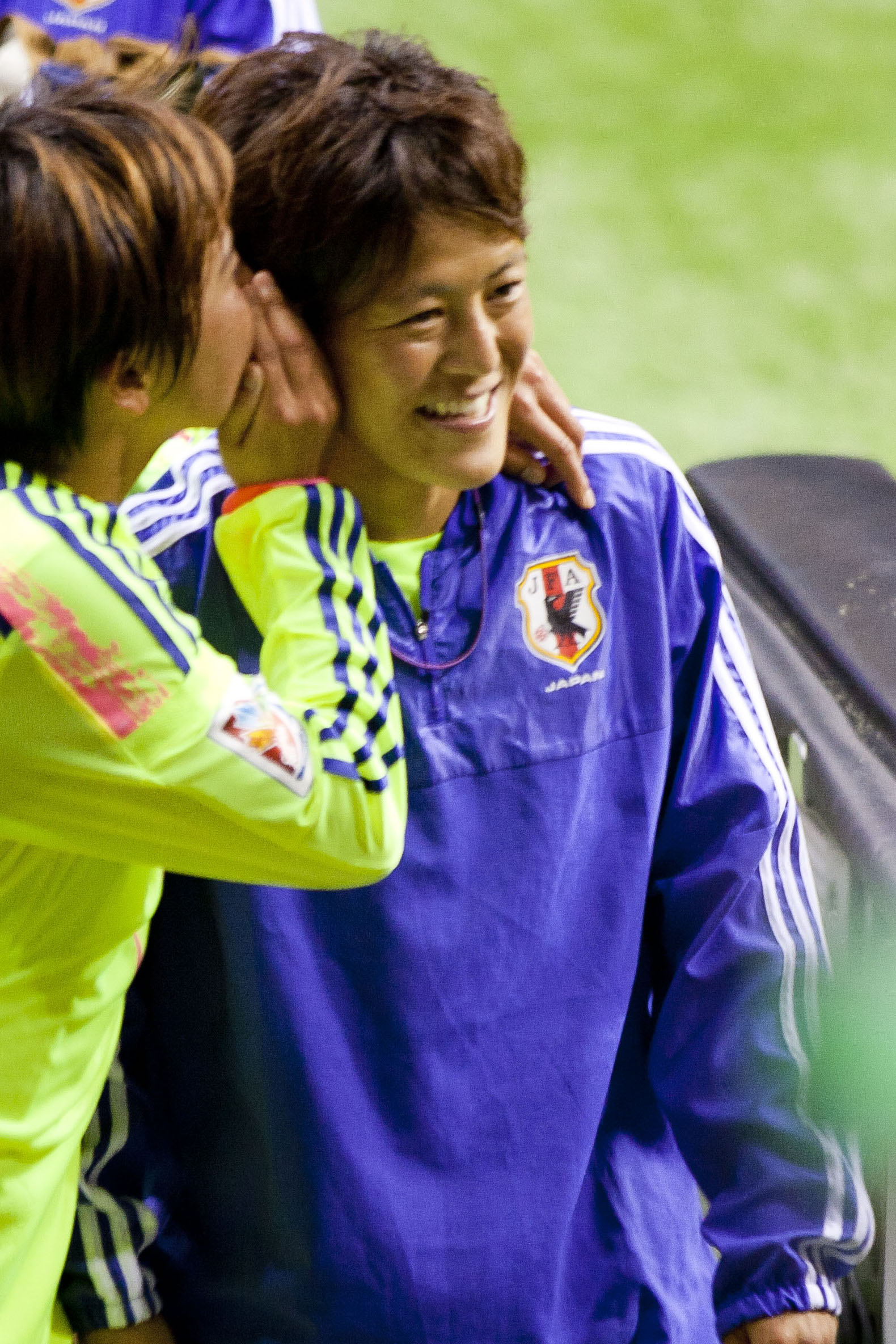

Personal information
- Full name: Saori Ariyoshi
- Date of birth: November 1, 1987 (age 39)
- Place of birth: Saga, Saga, Japan
- Height: 1.59 m (5 ft 2 1/2 in)
- Position: Defender

Team information
- Current team: Albirex Niigata
- Number: 6

Youth career
- 2003–2005: Kamimura Gakuen High School
- 2006–2009: Nippon Sport Science University

Senior career*
Years	Team	Apps	(Gls)
2008	TEPCO Mareeze	3	(0)
2010–2020	NTV Tokyo Verdy Beleza	142	(7)
2021–2024	Omiya Ardija Ventus	39	(3)
2024–	Albirex Niigata	13	(0)
Total		145	(7)

International career^{‡}
2012–2019	Japan	65	(1)
Medal record
Nippon TV Beleza
Winner	Nadeshiko League	2010
Winner	Nadeshiko League	2015
Winner	Nadeshiko League	2016
Winner	Nadeshiko League	2017
Winner	Nadeshiko League	2018
Runner-up	Nadeshiko League	2011
Runner-up	Nadeshiko League	2012
Runner-up	Nadeshiko League	2013
Runner-up	Nadeshiko League	2014
Winner	Nadeshiko League Cup	2010
Winner	Nadeshiko League Cup	2012
Winner	Nadeshiko League Cup	2016
Winner	Nadeshiko League Cup	2018
Winner	Empress's Cup	2014
Winner	Empress's Cup	2017
Winner	Empress's Cup	2018
Representing Japan
FIFA Women's World Cup
Silver medal – second place	2015 Canada
AFC Women's Asian Cup
Gold medal – first place	2014 Vietnam
Gold medal – first place	2018 Jordan
Asian Games
Gold medal – first place	2018 Jakarta-Palembang	Team
Silver medal – second place	2014 Incheon	Team
- * Club domestic league appearances and goals as of December 31, 2018 ‡ National team caps and goals as of March 2, 2019

Saori Ariyoshi (有吉 佐織, Ariyoshi Sayori; born November 1, 1987) is a Japanese footballer who currently plays for Albirex Niigata in the WE League. She has played for the Japan national team.

== Club career ==
Ariyoshi was born in Saga on November 1, 1987. In 2008, when she was at Nippon Sport Science University, she debuted in the L.League for TEPCO Mareeze. After graduating, she joined Nippon TV Beleza in 2010. She was selected for the Best Eleven four years in a row, from 2013 to 2016).

== National team career ==
In February 2012, Ariyoshi was selected Japan national team for 2012 Algarve Cup. At this competition, on February 29, she debuted against Norway. In 2014, she played at 2014 Asian Cup and 2014 Asian Games. Japan won the championship at Asian Cup and 2nd place at Asian Games. In 2015, she played at 2015 World Cup and Japan won 2nd place. She played 6 matches and scored a goal. She was named candidates for the Golden Ball at the tournament. She was also a member for 2018 Asian Cup and Japan won their second consecutive title. She played 63 games and scored 1 goals for Japan.

== National team statistics ==
Japan national team
Year	Apps	Goals
2012	5	0
2013	8	0
2014	17	0
2015	12	1
2016	7	0
2017	0	0
2018	14	0
2019	2	0
Total	65	1

== Honours ==
Tokyo Verdy Beleza

- AFC Women's Club Championship: 2019
