= Narumi Miura =

Japanese footballer (born 1997)

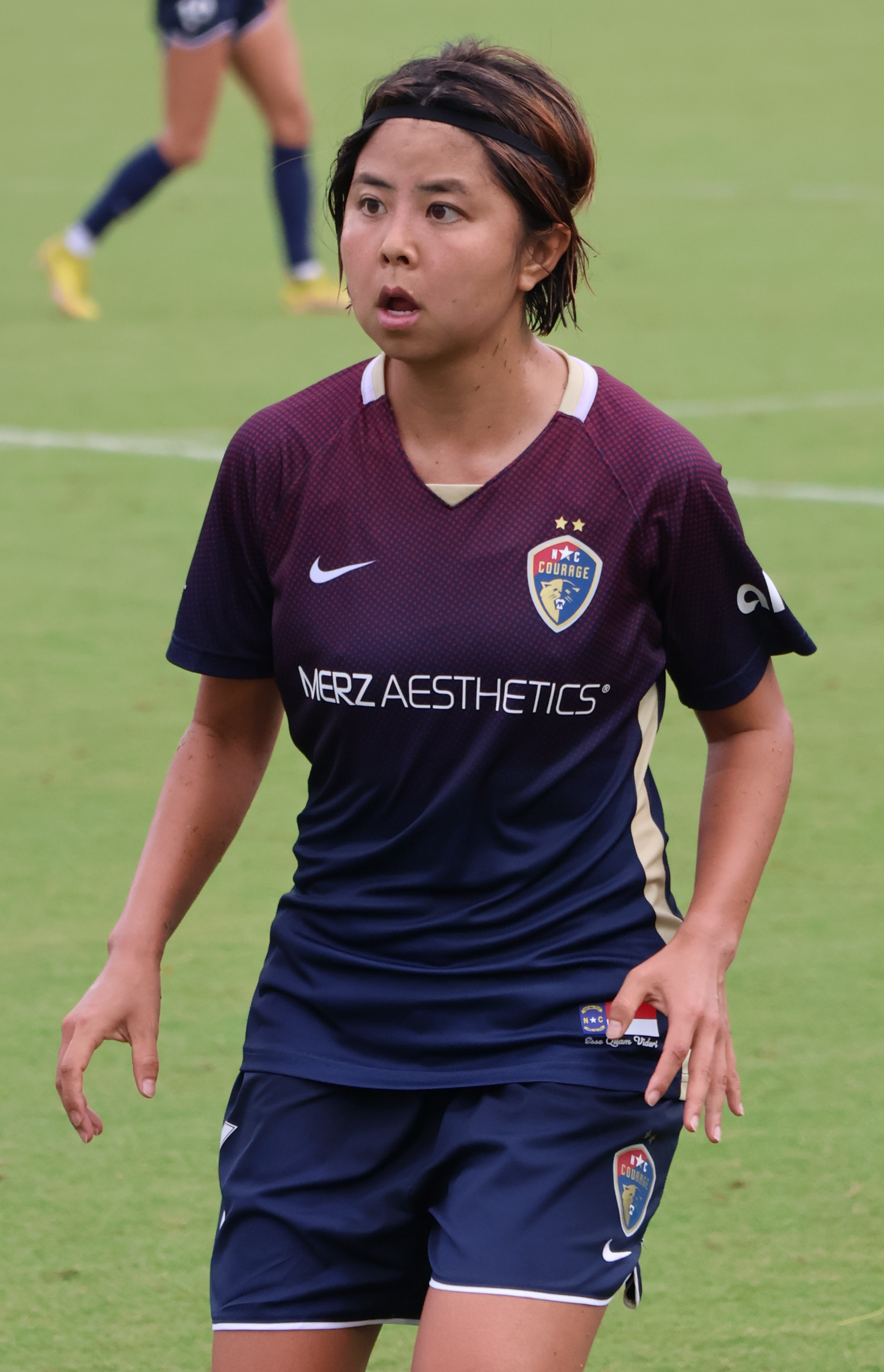
- Miura with the North Carolina Courage in 2023

Personal information
- Full name: Narumi Miura
- Date of birth: 3 July 1997 (age 29)
- Place of birth: Kawasaki, Kanagawa, Japan
- Height: 1.56 m (5 ft 1 1/2 in)
- Position: Midfielder

Team information
- Current team: Utah Royals
- Number: 10

Youth career
- 2010–2015: Tokyo Verdy Menina

Senior career*
Years	Team	Apps	(Gls)
2016–2023	Tokyo Verdy Beleza	84	(1)
2023–2024	North Carolina Courage	16	(0)
2025	Washington Spirit	23	(0)
2026–	Utah Royals	23	(3)

International career^{‡}
2016	Japan U-20	5	(0)
2018–	Japan	31	(0)
Medal record
Representing Japan
FIFA U-20 Women's World Cup
Bronze medal – third place	2016 Papua New Guinea
AFC U-19 Women's Championship
Gold medal – first place	2015 China
AFC U-16 Women's Championship
Gold medal – first place	2013 China
- * Club domestic league appearances and goals as of 04:22, 10 November 2026 (UTC) ‡ National team caps and goals as of 7 November 2023

Narumi Miura (三浦 成美, Miura Narumi; born 3 July 1997) is a Japanese professional footballer who plays as a midfielder for National Women's Soccer League (NWSL) club Utah Royals and the Japan national team.

== Club career ==
=== Tokyo Verdy Beleza, 2016–2023 ===
Narumi was born in Kawasaki on 3 July 1997. She joined Nadeshiko League club Tokyo Verdy Beleza in 2016, after being promoted from Tokyo Verdy Menina, their under-18 team. Despite being young and a newly-promoted player for Beleza, she played many matches from her first season as a professional. During her years with the club, Beleza won consecutive Nadeshiko League titles in 2016, 2017, 2018, and 2019.

=== North Carolina Courage, 2023–2024 ===
Narumi was signed by the North Carolina Courage on 7 February 2023. On 9 September 2023, she assisted the opening goal by Kerolin as the Courage won 2–0 against Racing Louisville in the 2023 NWSL Challenge Cup final. She played and started all 22 league games in 2023, doing so alongside Kaleigh Kurtz and Ryan Williams, and scored 1 goal with 3 assists. North Carolina placed third in the league and lost to eventual champions NJ/NY Gotham FC in the playoff quarterfinals. The following season, she played in 25 games with 23 starts as the Courage finished fifth and lost to the Kansas City Current in the quarterfinals.

=== Washington Spirit, 2025 ===
On 17 December 2024, the Washington Spirit announced they had signed Narumi as a free agent on a two-year contract with an option to extend another year. On 7 March 2025, she won a trophy after her Spirit debut in the 2025 NWSL Challenge Cup, converting a penalty in the shootout after a 1–1 draw against the Orlando Pride. She played in 23 league games, making 20 starts, and had 3 assists as the Spirit placed second in the table. In the quarterfinals, she substituted for Leicy Santos against Racing Louisville before the Spirit advanced on penalties, then was unused for the rest of the playoffs as they reached the 2025 NWSL Championship, losing to Gotham FC.

=== Utah Royals, 2026– ===
On 12 January 2026, Narumi was traded to the Utah Royals in exchange for US$180,000 in allocation money, signing a two-year contract with the mutual option for another year, and joined fellow Japanese internationals Mina Tanaka and Miyabi Moriya.

== International career ==
In September 2013, Narumi was selected for the Japan U-17s to play the 2013 AFC U-16 Women's Championship. She scored two goals at the tournament, with one of them being scored at the Final, that helped Japan to win the tournament for the second time in a row. In August 2015, she was selected for Japan U-20s to play the 2015 AFC U-19 Women's Championship, with Japan winning the tournament. In November 2016, she was once again selected for Japan U-20s, now for the 2016 U-20 Women's World Cup. At this tournament, she played five matches and Japan earned a third-place finish.

On 10 June 2018, Narumi debuted for the Japan national team against New Zealand.

On 10 May 2019, Miura was included in the 23-player squad for the 2019 FIFA Women's World Cup.

In 2021, Narumi represented Japan on the women's football tournament of the 2020 Olympics, which was held in her home country, Japan.

Miura was part of the Japan squad that won the 2025 SheBelieves Cup.

== Style of play ==
A central defensive midfielder, Miura is known for her vision, defensive ability, and passing.

== Career statistics ==
=== International ===
As of match played 23 September 2023

Appearances and goals by national team and year
National team	Year	Apps	Goals
Japan
Japan	2018	5	0
Japan	2019	12	0
Japan	2020	3	0
Japan	2021	8	0
Japan	2022	2	0
Japan	2023	1	0
Total		31	0

== Honours ==
Tokyo Verdy Beleza

- Nadeshiko League: 2016, 2017, 2018, 2019
- Empress's Cup: 2017, 2018, 2019, 2020, 2022
- Nadeshiko League Cup: 2016, 2018, 2019, 2020
- AFC Women's Club Championship: 2019

North Carolina Courage

- NWSL Challenge Cup: 2023

Washington Spirit

- NWSL Challenge Cup: 2025
