= Rin Sumida =

Japanese footballer (born 1996)

Rin Sumida 隅田 凜
Personal information
- Full name: Rin Sumida
- Date of birth: January 12, 1996 (age 30)
- Place of birth: Fujisawa, Kanagawa, Japan
- Height: 1.59 m (5 ft 2 1/2 in)
- Position: Midfielder

Team information
- Current team: Nippon TV Beleza
- Number: 6

Youth career
- 2008–2011: Nippon TV Beleza

Senior career*
Years	Team	Apps	(Gls)
2012–2018	Nippon TV Beleza	116	(13)
2019–2025	Mynavi Sendai	89	(4)
2025–	Nippon TV Beleza		
Total		163	(16)

International career^{‡}
2012	Japan U-17	4	(1)
2016	Japan U-20	6	(0)
2017–	Japan	27	(1)
Medal record
Nippon TV Beleza
Winner	Nadeshiko League	2015
Winner	Nadeshiko League	2016
Winner	Nadeshiko League	2017
Winner	Nadeshiko League	2018
Runner-up	Nadeshiko League	2012
Runner-up	Nadeshiko League	2013
Runner-up	Nadeshiko League	2014
Winner	Nadeshiko League Cup	2012
Winner	Nadeshiko League Cup	2016
Winner	Nadeshiko League Cup	2018
Winner	Empress's Cup	2014
Winner	Empress's Cup	2017
Winner	Empress's Cup	2018
Representing Japan
AFC Women's Asian Cup
Gold medal – first place	2018 Jordan
Asian Games
Gold medal – first place	2018 Jakarta-Palembang	Team
FIFA U-20 Women's World Cup
Bronze medal – third place	2016 Papua New Guinea
AFC U-19 Women's Championship
Gold medal – first place	2015 China
AFC U-16 Women's Championship
Gold medal – first place	2011 China
- * Club domestic league appearances and goals as of December 31, 2018 ‡ National team caps and goals as of December 4, 2022

Rin Sumida (隅田 凜, Sumida Rin; born January 12, 1996) is a Japanese footballer who plays as a midfielder. She plays for Nippon TV Beleza and the Japan national team.

== Club career ==
Sumida was born in Fujisawa on January 12, 1996. She joined Nippon TV Beleza from youth team in 2012. In 2019, she moved to Mynavi Vegalta Sendai.

== National team career ==
In 2012, Sumida played for Japan U-17 national team at 2012 U-17 World Cup. She also played for Japan U-20 national team at 2016 U-20 World Cup and Japan won 3rd place. On April 9, 2017, she debuted for Japan national team against Costa Rica. In 2018, she was a member for 2018 Asian Cup which Japan won. She played 22 games for Japan until 2018.

== National team statistics ==
Japan national team
Year	Apps	Goals
2017	7	0
2018	15	0
2019	0	0
2020	0	0
2021	2	0
2022	3	1
Total	27	1

== International goals ==
No.	Date	Venue	Opponent	Score	Result	Competition
1.	30 January 2022	DY Patil Stadium, Navi Mumbai, India	Thailand	3–0	7–0	2022 AFC Women's Asian Cup
