= Jun Endō =

Japanese footballer (born 2000)

Jun Endo 遠藤 純
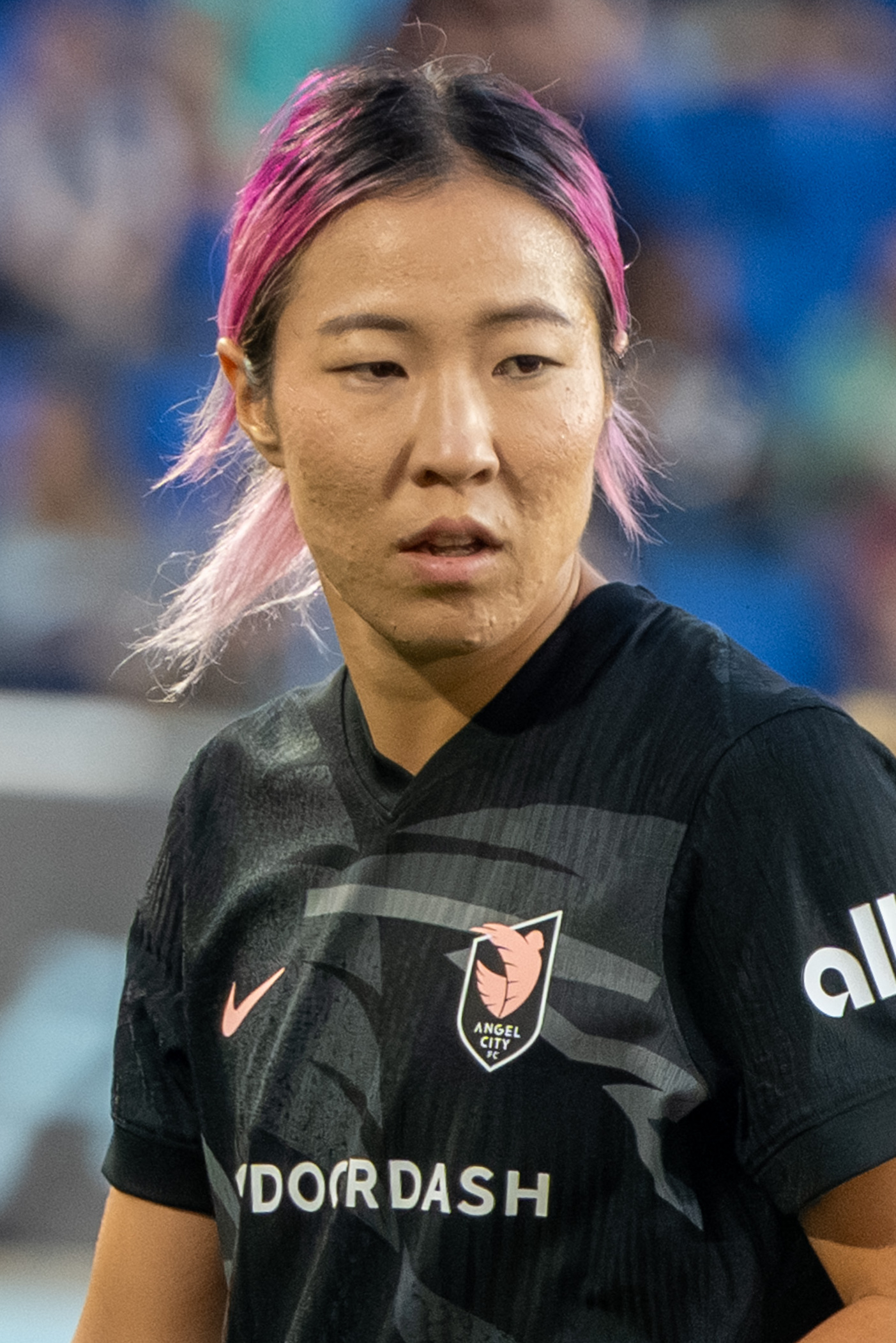
- Endo with Angel City FC in 2025

Personal information
- Full name: Jun Endo
- Date of birth: 24 May 2000 (age 26)
- Place of birth: Shirakawa, Fukushima, Japan
- Height: 1.66 m (5 ft 5 in)
- Positions: Forward; midfielder

Team information
- Current team: Angel City
- Number: 18

Youth career
- 2013–2018: JFA Academy Fukushima LSC

Senior career*
Years	Team	Apps	(Gls)
2018–2021	Tokyo Verdy Beleza	41	(13)
2022–	Angel City	58	(4)

International career^{‡}
2016	Japan U-17	4	(3)
2018	Japan U-20	6	(2)
2019–	Japan	42	(5)
Medal record
Representing Japan
FIFA U-20 Women's World Cup
Gold medal – first place	2018 France
AFC U-19 Women's Championship
Gold medal – first place	2017 China
FIFA U-17 Women's World Cup
Silver medal – second place	2016 Jordan
AFC U-16 Women's Championship
Silver medal – second place	2015 China
- * Club domestic league appearances and goals as of 05:59, 12 November 2026 (UTC) ‡ National team caps and goals as of 02:06, 1 December 2023 (UTC)

Jun Endo (遠藤 純, Endō Jun; born 24 May 2000) is a Japanese professional footballer who plays as a forward or attacking midfielder for Angel City FC of the National Women's Soccer League (NWSL) and the Japan national team. She previously played for Nippon TV Beleza of the Japanese Nadeshiko League and won the 2019 AFC Women's Club Championship.

== Early life ==
Endo was born in Fukushima Prefecture on 24 May 2000. Endo is the youngest of four children. Her father is a football coach, and her mother is a teacher, and her family lived next door to her grandparents in her hometown of Shirakawa in the Fukushima Prefecture of Japan.

The April 2011 Fukushima earthquake struck while Endo, then 10 years old, was in class and heavily damaged her school. Her family and their homes survived, and they were not required to evacuate from the subsequent release of radiation at the Fukushima Daiichi Nuclear Power Plant; as she wasn't allowed to go outside, she continued to practice football inside her home, which contributed to her ability to handle the ball in confined spaces. In a 2023 interview, Endo said that at the time she had been bullied by youth players who would often act like players from Fukushima were "contaminated" by radioactivity. Despite this, the subsequent Japanese victory at the 2011 FIFA Women's World Cup inspired Endo to continue her football career.

== Club career ==
=== Tokyo Verdy Beleza, 2018–2021 ===
In 2018, she joined L.League club Nippon TV Beleza from JFA Academy Fukushima LSC. In 2019, Endo won the 2019 AFC Women's Club Championship with Nippon TV Beleza.

=== Angel City FC, 2022– ===
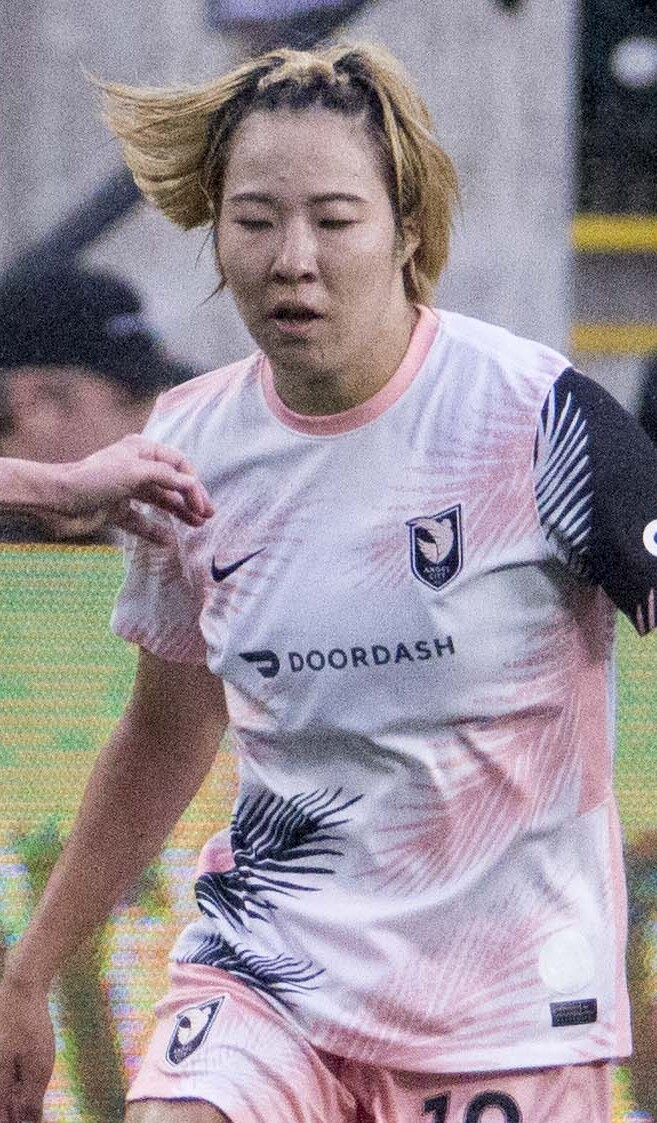
Endo playing for Angel City in 2022

On 20 December 2021, Endo signed with NWSL club Angel City FC for the club's inaugural season. On 29 April 2022, she assisted the first goal and scored the second in Angel City's first-ever regular season game, a win over North Carolina Courage, and was awarded Player of the Match. In her first season with Angel City, Endo played 22 games and racked up 1,925 minutes. The club finished their first season in eighth place with a 8–9–5 record.

Endo returned to Angel City for the 2023 season and started in 10 of the 18 games she played in addition to playing in the 2023 FIFA Women's World Cup. She notched her first goal and assist of the season in a 3-2 win over Kansas City Current in May.

During a 2-2 draw against Chicago Red Stars on 17 September, she scored the club's second goal. She scored Angel City's last goal in a 5-1 rout against Portland Thorns FC on 15 October. Angel City finished in fifth place during the regular season and advanced to the playoffs for the first time where they were eliminated by Seattle Reign FC in the quarter final match.

On 29 November 2023, Angel City announced they would exercise their one-year option to extend Endo's contract through 2024. In February 2024, Endo suffered a season-ending ACL injury to her left-knee during a preseason training camp in Melbourne, Florida. On 5 September 2024, Angel City announced Endo would be signing a new contract with Angel City beginning in 2025, keeping her at the club through 2027.

== International career ==
=== Youth ===
In 2016, Endo was selected for the Japan U-17 national team for the 2016 U-17 World Cup. She played in four matches and scored three goals, helping Japan win second place.

In 2018, Endo was selected for the Japan U-20 national team for the 2018 U-20 World Cup. She played in all six matches and scored two goals, and Japan won the championship.

=== Senior ===
In February 2019, Endo was selected for the Japan national team for the SheBelieves Cup. She earned her first cap for the senior nation al team on 27 February during the match against the United States.

In 2019, Endo was the youngest member of the 2019 Japanese World Cup team and played in three of Japan's four games.

On 18 June 2021, she was included in the Japan squad for the 2020 Summer Olympics.

On 7 January 2022, Endo was called up to the 2022 AFC Women's Asian Cup squad.

In February 2023, Endo was selected for the Japan national team for the SheBelieves Cup. She scored in Japan's 3-0 win over Canada. On 13 June 2023, she was included in the 23-player squad for the FIFA Women's World Cup 2023.

== Career statistics ==
=== Club ===
As of match played 18 August 2025

Appearances and goals by club, season and competition
Club	Season	League			National cup (Note: Includes Empress's Cup)		League cup (Note: Includes Nadeshiko League Cup, WE League Cup, NWSL Challenge Cup)		Continental		Total	
Club	Season	Division	Apps	Goals	Apps	Goals	Apps	Goals	Apps	Goals	Apps	Goals
Tokyo Verdy Beleza	2018	Nadeshiko League	0	0	0	0	1	0	–		1	0
Tokyo Verdy Beleza	2019	Nadeshiko League	18	5	5	1	4	0	3 (Note: AFC Women's Club Championship)	0	30	6
Tokyo Verdy Beleza	2020	Nadeshiko League	15	8	5	5	–		–		20	13
Tokyo Verdy Beleza	2021–22	WE League	8	0	2	0	–		–		10	0
Tokyo Verdy Beleza	Total		41	13	12	6	5	0	3	0	61	19
Angel City	2022	NWSL	22	1	–		6	0	–		28	1
Angel City	2023	NWSL	18	3	–		1	0	–		19	3
Angel City	2024	NWSL	0	0	–		–		–		0	0
Angel City	2025	NWSL	5	0	–		–		–		5	0
Angel City	Total		45	4	–		7	0	–		52	4
Career total			86	17	12	6	12	0	3	0	113	23

=== International ===
As of match played 30 November 2023

Appearances and goals by national team and year
National Team	Year	Apps	Goals
Japan	2019	12	0
Japan	2020	2	0
Japan	2021	7	1
Japan	2022	7	1
Japan	2023	14	3
Total		42	5

Scores and results list Japan's goal tally first, score column indicates score after each Endo goal.

List of international goals scored by Jun Endo
No.	Date	Venue	Opponent	Score	Result	Competition	Ref
1	13 June 2021	Kanseki Stadium Tochigi, Utsunomiya, Japan	Mexico	5–1	5–1	Friendly	
2	27 June 2022	Veritas Stadion, Turku, Finland	Finland	2–1	5–1	Friendly	
3	22 February 2023	Toyota Stadium, Frisco, United States	Canada	3–0	3–0	2023 SheBelieves Cup	
4	22 July 2023	Waikato Stadium, Hamilton, New Zealand	Zambia	4–0	5–0	2023 FIFA Women's World Cup	
5	30 November 2023	Arena Corinthians, São Paulo, Brazil	Brazil	2–3	3–4	Friendly	

== Honours ==
Tokyo Verdy Beleza

- Nadeshiko League: 2018, 2019
- Empress's Cup: 2019, 2020
- Nadeshiko League Cup: 2018, 2019
- AFC Women's Club Championship: 2019

Japan U20

- AFC U-19 Women's Championship: 2017
- FIFA U-20 Women's World Cup: 2018

Japan

- EAFF E-1 Football Championship: 2019
