= Momiki =

Momiki may refer to:

- Yūka Momiki (born 1996), Japanese footballer
- Momiki Tameike Dam, an earthfill dam in Miyazaki Prefecture, Japan
