= Yūka Momiki =

Japanese footballer

Yuka Momiki 籾木 結花
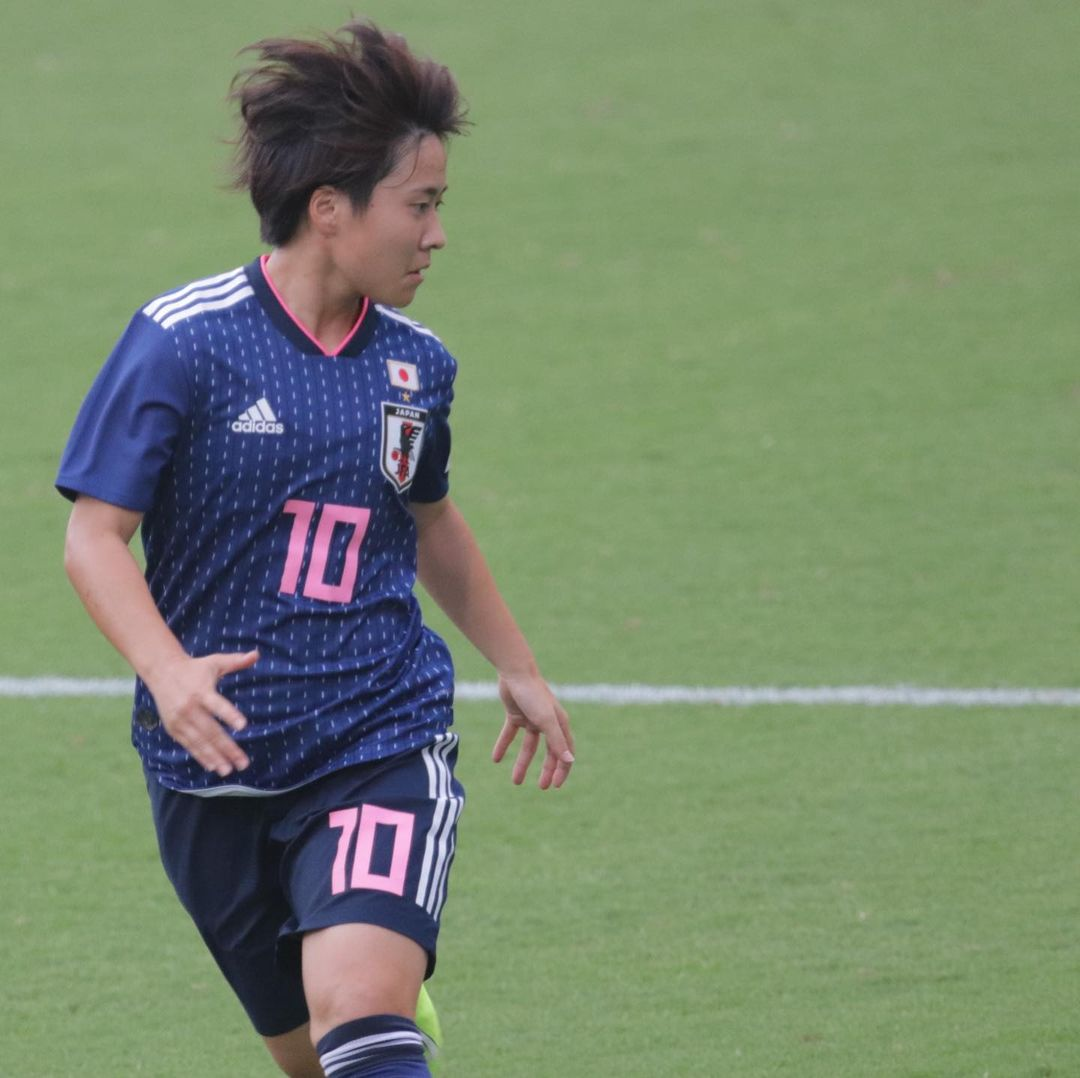

Personal information
- Full name: Yūka Nicole Momiki
- Date of birth: 9 April 1996 (age 30)
- Place of birth: New York City, United States
- Height: 1.53 m (5 ft 0 in)
- Position: Forward

Team information
- Current team: Everton
- Number: 29

Youth career
- 2009–2010: Nippon TV Beleza

Senior career*
Years	Team	Apps	(Gls)
2011–2020	Nippon TV Beleza	117	(39)
2020–2021	OL Reign	0	(0)
2020	→ Linköpings FC (loan)	1	(0)
2021	→ Linköpings FC (loan)	10	(1)
2022–2023	Linköpings FC	41	(15)
2024–2025	Leicester City	34	(5)
2025–	Everton	23	(3)

International career^{‡}
2012	Japan U17	3	(1)
2016	Japan U20	6	(7)
2017–	Japan	47	(15)
Medal record
Women's football
Representing Japan
Asian Games
Gold medal – first place	2018 Jakarta-Palembang	Team
FIFA U-20 Women's World Cup
Bronze medal – third place	2016 Papua New Guinea
AFC U-19 Women's Championship
Winner	2015 China
AFC U-16 Women's Championship
Winner	2011 China
- * Club domestic league appearances and goals as of 06:40, 15 September 2026 (UTC) ‡ National team caps and goals as of 15:56, 22 December 2025 (UTC)

Yūka Nicole Momiki (籾木 結花 ニコル, Momiki Yūka Nikoru; IPA: [moꜜmiki jɯːka ɲikoꜜɾɯ]; born 9 April 1996) is a professional soccer player who plays as a forward for Women's Super League club Everton. Born in the United States, she plays for the Japan national team.

== Club career ==
Momiki joined Nippon TV Beleza from youth team in 2011. She was selected in the Best Eleven in 2016 and 2017.

On 22 May 2020, Momiki signed for OL Reign of the National Women's Soccer League. After two separate loan spells in Sweden, Momiki transferred permanently to Linköpings FC on 10 December 2021. In January 2024, she signed for Leicester City. After her contract expired in July 2025, she joined Everton.

== International career ==
Born in the United States to Japanese parents, Momiki was eligible to represent Japan or the United States at the international level. She opted to play for Japan.

In 2012, Momiki was selected for Japan U-17 national team for 2012 U-17 World Cup.

In 2016, Momiki was selected for Japan U-20 national team for 2016 U-20 World Cup. At this competition, she played 6 games and scored 7 goals, helping Japan to a third-place finish.

In 2017, Momiki was selected for the Japan national team for the 2017 Algarve Cup. At this competition, on 1 March, she debuted against Spain. She played 21 games and scored 6 goals for Japan in 2017.

On 10 May 2019, Momiki was included in the 23-player squad for the 2019 FIFA Women's World Cup.

On 18 June 2021, she was included in the Japan squad for the 2020 Summer Olympics.

Momiki was part of the Japan squad that won the 2025 SheBelieves Cup.

== Career statistics ==
=== Club ===
As of match played 13 September 2026

Appearances and goals by club, season and competition
Club	Season	League			National cup (Note: Includes Empress's Cup, Svenska Cupen, Women's FA Cup)		League cup (Note: Includes Nadeshiko League Cup, NWSL Challenge Cup, FA Women's League Cup)		Continental (Note: Includes AFC Women's Club Championship, UEFA Women's Champions League)		Total	
Club	Season	Division	Apps	Goals	Apps	Goals	Apps	Goals	Apps	Goals	Apps	Goals
Nippon TV Beleza	2011	Nadeshiko League	1	1	0	0	0	0	—		1	1
Nippon TV Beleza	2012	Nadeshiko League	4	0	2	0	1	0	—		7	0
Nippon TV Beleza	2013	Nadeshiko League	18	5	2	1	8	2	—		28	8
Nippon TV Beleza	2014	Nadeshiko League	28	10	4	1	0	0	—		32	11
Nippon TV Beleza	2015	Nadeshiko League	19	5	3	2	0	0	—		22	7
Nippon TV Beleza	2016	Nadeshiko League	18	7	4	5	10	8	—		32	20
Nippon TV Beleza	2017	Nadeshiko League	17	7	4	1	6	5	—		27	13
Nippon TV Beleza	2018	Nadeshiko League	12	4	5	6	6	2	—		23	11
Nippon TV Beleza	2019	Nadeshiko League	17	4	5	0	4	2	2	0	28	6
Nippon TV Beleza	Total		134	43	29	16	35	19	2	0	200	78
OL Reign	2020	National Women's Soccer League	0	0	—		5	0	—		5	0
OL Reign	2021	National Women's Soccer League	0	0	—		3	0	—		3	0
OL Reign	Total		0	0	0	0	8	0	0	0	8	0
Linköpings (loan)	2020	Damallsvenskan	1	0	0	0	—		—		1	0
Linköpings (loan)	2021	Damallsvenskan	10	1	2	0	—		—		12	1
Linköpings	2022	Damallsvenskan	26	7	1	0	—		—		27	7
Linköpings	2023	Damallsvenskan	24	15	3	2	—		2	1	29	18
Linköpings	Total		50	22	4	2	0	0	2	1	69	26
Leicester City	2023–24	Women's Super League	12	2	4	0	1	0	—		17	2
Leicester City	2024–25	Women's Super League	22	3	2	2	2	1	—		26	6
Leicester City	Total		34	5	6	2	3	1	0	0	43	8
Everton	2025–26	Women's Super League	21	3	2	2	3	1	—		26	6
Everton	2026–27	Women's Super League	2	0	0	0	0	0	—		2	0
Everton	Total		23	3	2	2	3	1	0	0	28	6
Career total			252	74	43	20	49	19	4	1	248	114

=== International ===
As of match played 28 October 2025

Appearances and goals by national team and year
National team	Year	Apps	Goals
Japan	2017	14	3
Japan	2018	7	3
Japan	2019	9	4
Japan	2020	3	0
Japan	2021	7	4
Japan	2025	7	1
Total		47	15

Scores and results list Japan's goal tally first, score column indicates score after each Momiki goal.

List of international goals scored by Yūka Momiki
No.	Date	Venue	Opponent	Score	Result	Competition
1	9 April 2017	Umakana Yokana Stadium, Kumamoto, Japan	Costa Rica	3–0	3–0	Friendly
2	27 July 2017	CenturyLink Field, Seattle, United States	Brazil	1–0	1–1	2017 Tournament of Nations
3	30 July 2017	Qualcomm Stadium, San Diego, United States	Australia	2–4	2–4	2017 Tournament of Nations
4	16 August 2018	Bumi Sriwijaya Stadium, Palembang, Indonesia	Thailand	2–0	2–0	2018 Asian Games
5	21 August 2018	Gelora Sriwijaya Stadium, Palembang, Indonesia	Vietnam	2–0	7–0	2018 Asian Games
6	11 November 2018	Tottori Bank Bird Stadium, Tottori, Japan	Norway	4–0	4–1	Friendly
7	28 February 2019	Talen Energy Stadium, Chester, United States	United States	2–2	2–2	2019 SheBelieves Cup
8	3 March 2019	Nissan Stadium, Nashville, United States	Brazil	1–0	3–1	2019 SheBelieves Cup
9	6 October 2019	IAI Stadium Nihondaira, Shizuoka, Japan	Canada	2–0	4–0	Friendly
10	17 December 2019	Busan Gudeok Stadium, Busan, South Korea	South Korea	1–0	1–0	2019 EAFF E-1 Football Championship
11	8 April 2021	Yurtec Stadium Sendai, Sendai, Japan	Paraguay	6–0	7–0	Friendly
12	11 April 2021	Japan National Stadium, Tokyo, Japan	Panama	5–0	7–0	Friendly
13	10 June 2021	Hiroshima Big Arch, Hiroshima, Japan	Ukraine	8–0	8–0	Friendly
14	13 June 2021	Kanseki Stadium Tochigi, Utsunomiya, Japan	Mexico	3–1	5–1	Friendly
15	26 February 2025	Snapdragon Stadium, San Diego, United States	United States	1–0	2–1	2025 SheBelieves Cup

== Honours ==
Tokyo Verdy Beleza

- Nadeshiko League: 2015, 2016, 2017, 2018, 2019
- Empress's Cup: 2014, 2017, 2018, 2019
- Nadeshiko League Cup: 2012, 2016, 2018, 2019
- AFC Women's Club Championship: 2019
