= 2012 Nadeshiko League Cup final =

Nippon TV Beleza	INAC Kobe Leonessa
3	2
- Date: September 9, 2012
- Venue: Omiya Football Stadium, Saitama

2012 Nadeshiko League Cup final was the 7th final of the Nadeshiko League Cup competition. The final was played at Omiya Football Stadium in Saitama on September 9, 2012. Nippon TV Beleza won the championship.

== Overview ==
Nippon TV Beleza won their 3rd title, by defeating INAC Kobe Leonessa 3–2 with Asano Nagasato and Yayoi Kobayashi goal.

== Match details ==
September 9, 2012

Nippon TV Beleza	3-2	INAC Kobe Leonessa
Asano Nagasato 7', 56'; Yayoi Kobayashi 44'	Report	Ji So-yun 23'; Goebel Yanez 30'

Omiya Football Stadium

== See also ==
- 2012 Nadeshiko League Cup
