= Ayaka Saito (footballer) =

Japanese footballer

Personal information
- Date of birth: 26 August 1991 (age 35)
- Place of birth: Chiba Prefecture, Japan
- Height: 1.74 m (5 ft 9 in)
- Position: Goalkeeper

Team information
- Current team: MyNavi Sendai
- Number: 1

Senior career*
Years	Team	Apps	(Gls)
2010-2011	TEPCO Mareeze	0	(0)
2012-	MyNavi Sendai	44	(0)
- * Club domestic league appearances and goals

Ayaka Saito (born 26 August 1991) is a Japanese professional footballer who plays as a goalkeeper for WE League club MyNavi Sendai.

== Club career ==
Saito made her WE League debut on 17 October 2021.
