= Momiki Tameike Dam =

Dam in Miyazaki Prefecture, Japan

Momiki Tameike
- Location within Japan
- Official name: 籾木溜池
- Location: Miyazaki Prefecture, Japan
- Coordinates: 32°3′56″N 131°17′32″E
- Opening date: 1914

Dam and spillways
- Height: 23.6 m (77 ft)
- Length: 129 m (423 ft)

Reservoir
- Total capacity: 167 thousand cubic meters
- Catchment area: 1 sq. km
- Surface area: 19 hectares

Momiki Tameike (Japanese: 籾木溜池) is an earthfill dam located in Miyazaki Prefecture in Japan. The dam is used for irrigation. The catchment area of the dam is 1 km^{2}. The dam impounds about 19 ha of land when full and can store 167 thousand cubic meters of water. The construction of the dam was completed in 1914.

== See also ==
- List of dams in Japan
