= 2016 Nadeshiko League Cup final =

Nippon TV Beleza	JEF United Chiba Ladies
4	0
- Date: September 3, 2016
- Venue: Nishigaoka Soccer Stadium, Tokyo

2016 Nadeshiko League Cup final was the 9th final of the Nadeshiko League Cup competition. The final was played at Nishigaoka Soccer Stadium in Tokyo on September 3, 2016. Nippon TV Beleza won the championship.

== Overview ==
Nippon TV Beleza won their 4th title, by defeating JEF United Chiba Ladies 4–0 with Yuka Momiki, Mina Tanaka and Rin Sumida goal.

== Match details ==
September 3, 2016

Nippon TV Beleza	4-0	JEF United Chiba Ladies
Yuka Momiki 55', 90+1'; Mina Tanaka 59'; Rin Sumida 64'	Report

Nishigaoka Soccer Stadium

== See also ==
- 2016 Nadeshiko League Cup
