= 2019 Nadeshiko League =

- Season: 2019
- Dates: 21 March 2019 – 3 November 2019
- Champions: NTV Beleza (14th and 5th consecutive title)
- Matches played: 90
- Goals scored: 241 (2.68 per match)
- Top goalscorer: Mina Tanaka (20 goals)
- Biggest home win: NTV Beleza 11–0 Nittaidai (2 March 2019)
- Biggest away win: Nittaidai 1–6 NTV Beleza (14 October 2019) Nojima Stella 0–5 NTV Beleza (16 September 2019)
- Highest scoring: NTV Beleza 11–0 Nittaidai (2 March 2019)
- All statistics correct as of 17 November 2019.

The 2019 Nadeshiko League was the 31st season of Japan's women's association football highest division league.

== Nadeshiko League Division 1 ==
The season started on 21 March 2019 and was completed on 3 November 2019 with the play-offs on 10 November 2019 and 16 November 2019. NTV Beleza won their 14th and their 5th consecutive title.

=== Teams ===
10 teams contested the league, nine teams from the previous season and one promoted team, Iga FC Kunoichi. Nittaidai was able to defeat Nippatsu Yokohama FC Seagulls at the play-offs and thus remained in the league.

Team	Location	2018 position
AC Nagano Parceiro Ladies	Nagano	7th
Albirex Niigata Ladies	Niigata	5th
Iga FC Kunoichi	Iga, Mie	1st in Nadeshiko League Division 2 (promoted)
INAC Kobe Leonessa	Kobe	2nd
JEF United Ichihara Chiba Ladies	Ichihara	6th
Nittaidai	Yokohama	9th (Play-off winner)
NTV Beleza	Inagi	1st
Nojima Stella	Sagamihara	3rd
Urawa Red Diamonds Ladies	Saitama	4th
Vegalta Sendai Ladies	Sendai	8th

=== Location of teams ===
Locations of 2019 Nadeshiko League Division 1 teams

== League table ==
Pos	Team	Pld	W	D	L	GF	GA	GD	Pts	Qualification or relegation
1	NTV Beleza	18	13	3	2	59	17	+42	42	League Winner
2	Urawa Red Diamonds	18	13	0	5	37	16	+21	39	
3	INAC Kobe Leonessa	18	9	4	5	28	17	+11	31	
4	Iga Kunoichi	18	7	6	5	21	17	+4	27	
5	JEF United Chiba	18	7	5	6	18	19	−1	26	
6	Albirex Niigata	18	6	6	6	17	19	−2	24	
7	Nojima Stella	18	6	1	11	15	29	−14	19	
8	Mynavi Vegalta Sendai	18	4	4	10	15	29	−14	16	
9	AC Nagano Parceiro	18	4	3	11	15	26	−11	15	To Relegation play-offs
10	Nittaidai	18	4	2	12	16	52	−36	14	Relegation to 2020 Nadeshiko League Division 2

Source: Soccerway
Rules for classification: 1) Points; 2) Goal difference; 3) Number of goals scored; 4) Head-to-head points; 5) Head-to-head goal difference; 6) Head-to-head away goals scored

== Results ==
Home \ Away	ALB	NIT	NAG	INA	IGA	JEF	NTV	NOJ	URA	VEG
Albirex Niigata	—	0–0	1–0	0–1	1–0	1–1	3–2	1–0	0–1	4–1
Nittaidai	1–0	—	0–3	1–4	2–0	0–2	1–6	2–4	1–5	1–3
Nagano Parceiro	0–1	2–3	—	1–2	0–1	1–1	0–0	2–1	1–2	0–1
INAC Kobe	5–2	2–1	4–0	—	0–1	1–0	1–1	0–1	2–1	1–2
Iga Kunoichi	1–1	1–1	0–0	3–3	—	4–0	1–1	3–0	1–2	2–1
JEF United	0–0	2–1	2–0	0–0	0–1	—	1–2	1–0	0–2	1–0
NTV Beleza	3–1	11–0	4–1	2–1	3–0	3–1	—	4–2	2–3	3–0
Nojima Stella	0–0	0–1	0–1	1–0	1–0	1–2	0–5	—	1–4	1–0
Urawa Red	2–0	6–0	2–1	0–1	0–1	0–2	1–3	2–0	—	2–0
Vegalta Sendai	1–1	1–0	1–2	0–0	1–1	2–2	0–4	1–2	0–2	—

Source: Soccerway
Legend: Blue = home team win; Yellow = draw; Red = away team win.

== Statistics ==
=== Topscorers ===
Updated to matches played on 3 November 2020

Rank	Player	Club	Goals
1	(Japan) Mina Tanaka	NTV Beleza	20
2	(Japan) Yuika Sugasawa	Urawa Reds	11
3	(Japan) Riko Ueki	NTV Beleza	8
4	(Japan) Rikako Kobayashi	NTV Beleza	7
4	(Japan) Mai Kyōkawa	INAC Kobe Leonessa	7
6	(Japan) Manami Nakano	Nojima Stella	6
6	(Japan) Ami Sugita	Iga Kunoichi	6

=== Awards ===
Award	Winner	
Best Player Award (MVP)	(Japan) Mina Tanaka	NTV Beleza
Top Scorer	(Japan) Mina Tanaka	NTV Beleza
Best Young Player	(Japan) Satsuki Miura	INAC Kobe Leonessa

=== Best XI ===
Pos	Player	Club
GK	(Japan) Ayaka Yamashita	NTV Beleza
DF	(Japan) Mayo Doko	NTV Beleza
DF	(Japan) Moeka Minami	Urawa Reds
DF	(Japan) Risa Shimizu	NTV Beleza
DF	(Japan) Narumi Miura	NTV Beleza
MF	(Japan) Hina Sugita	INAC Kobe Leonessa
MF	(Japan) Emi Nakajima	INAC Kobe Leonessa
MF	(Japan) Yui Hasegawa	NTV Beleza
FW	(Japan) Yuka Momiki	NTV Beleza
FW	(Japan) Mina Tanaka	NTV Beleza
FW	(Japan) Yuika Sugasawa	Urawa Reds
