= 2018 Nadeshiko League Cup final =

Nippon TV Beleza	INAC Kobe Leonessa
1	0
- Date: July 21, 2018
- Venue: Nishigaoka Soccer Stadium, Tokyo

2018 Nadeshiko League Cup final was the 11th final of the Nadeshiko League Cup competition. The final was played at Nishigaoka Soccer Stadium in Tokyo on July 21, 2018. Nippon TV Beleza won the championship.

== Overview ==
Nippon TV Beleza won their 7th title, by defeating INAC Kobe Leonessa 1–0 with Mina Tanaka goal.

== Match details ==
July 21, 2018

Nippon TV Beleza	1–0	INAC Kobe Leonessa
Tanaka 85'	Report

Nishigaoka Soccer Stadium

== See also ==
- 2018 Nadeshiko League Cup
