= 2019 SheBelieves Cup =

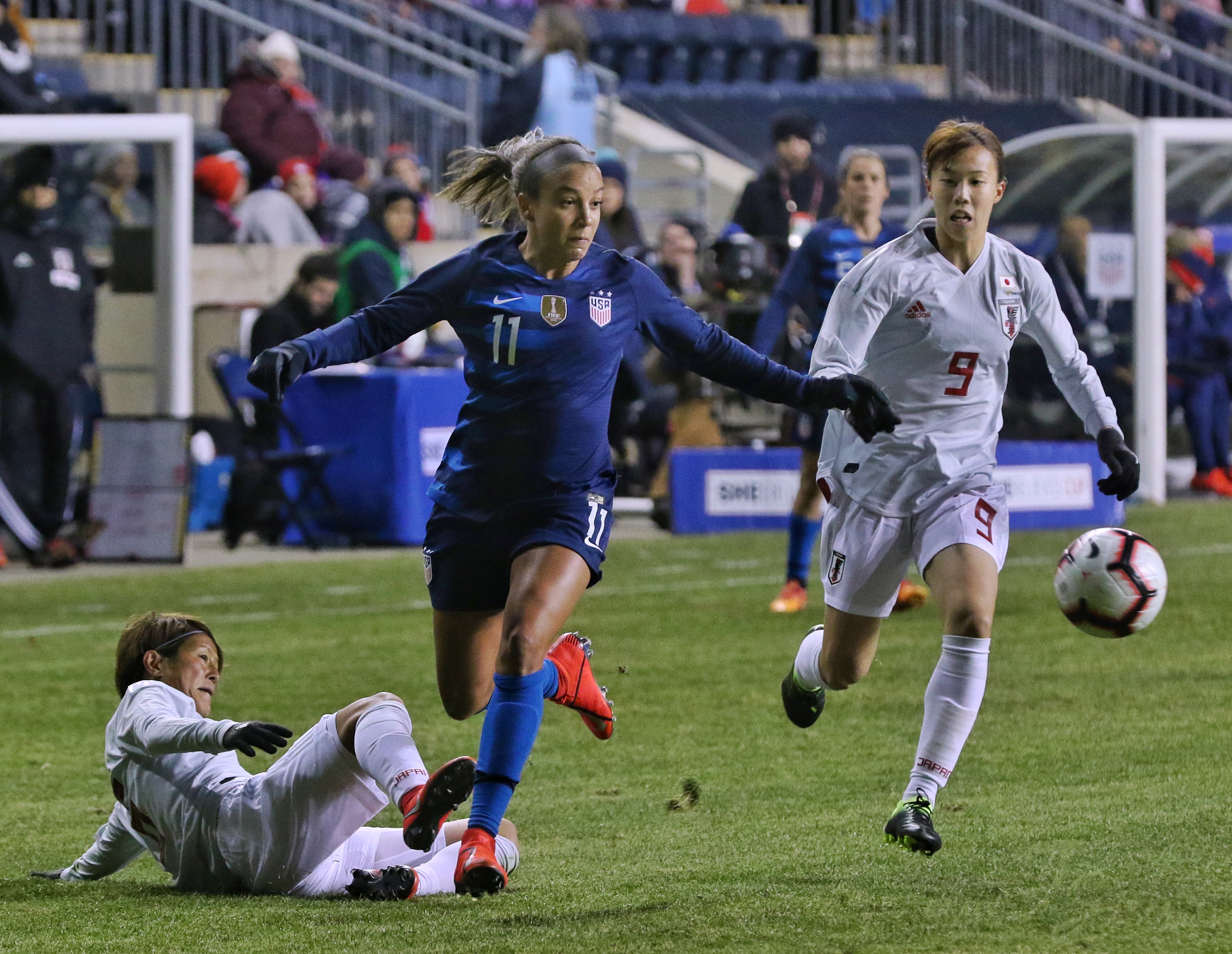

Tournament details
- Host country: United States
- Dates: February 27 – March 5
- Teams: 4 (from 4 confederations)
- Venues: 3 (in 3 host cities)

Final positions
- Champions: England (1st title)
- Runners-up: United States
- Third place: Japan
- Fourth place: Brazil

Tournament statistics
- Matches played: 6
- Goals scored: 19 (3.17 per match)
- Attendance: 77,809 (12,968 per match)
- Top scorer(s): (United States) Tobin Heath (England) Beth Mead (Japan) Yuka Momiki (United States) Megan Rapinoe (2 goals each)

The 2019 SheBelieves Cup was the fourth edition of the SheBelieves Cup, an invitational women's soccer tournament held in the United States. Featuring national teams from Brazil, England, Japan, and hosts United States, it began on February 27 and ended on March 5, 2019. Having kept the same four teams in the first three editions, 2019 was the first time that France and Germany had not taken part. They were instead replaced by Japan and Brazil, the first time teams from either the AFC or CONMEBOL had taken part.

The United States were the defending champions. England won the tournament for the first time.

== Format ==
The four invited teams played a round-robin tournament. Points awarded in the group stage followed the formula of three points for a win, one point for a draw, and zero points for a loss. A tie in points would be decided by goal differential; other tie-breakers are listed below.

== Venues ==
Chester (Philadelphia area)	Nashville	Tampa
Talen Energy Stadium	Nissan Stadium	Raymond James Stadium
Capacity: 18,500	Capacity: 69,193	Capacity: 66,321
2019 SheBelieves Cup is located in the United States

== Teams ==
Team	FIFA Rankings (December 2018)
United States	1
England	4
Japan	8
Brazil	10

== Standings ==
Pos	Team	Pld	W	D	L	GF	GA	GD	Pts
1	England (C)	3	2	1	0	7	3	+4	7
2	United States (H)	3	1	2	0	5	4	+1	5
3	Japan	3	1	1	1	5	6	−1	4
4	Brazil	3	0	0	3	2	6	−4	0

Source: USSoccer
Rules for classification: 1) points; 2) goal difference; 3) goals scored; 4) head-to-head result; 5) FIFA ranking.
(C) Champions; (H) Hosts

== Results ==
February 27, 2019
19:00 ET

United States	2–2	Japan
Rapinoe 23'; Morgan 76'	Report	Nakajima 67'; Momiki 90+1'

Talen Energy Stadium, Chester, Pennsylvania
Attendance: 14,555
Referee: Melissa Borjas (Honduras)
February 27, 2019
16:00 ET

England	2–1	Brazil
White 49'; Mead 75'	Report	Andressa 16' (pen.)

Talen Energy Stadium, Chester, Pennsylvania
Attendance: 5,954
Referee: Katja Koroleva (United States)

March 2, 2019
13:00 CT

Brazil	1–3	Japan
Debinha 57'	Report	Momiki 44'; Kobayashi 81'; Hasegawa 85'

Nissan Stadium, Nashville, Tennessee
Attendance: 12,586
Referee: Karen Abt (United States)
March 2, 2019
15:30 CT

United States	2–2	England
Rapinoe 33'; Heath 67'	Report	Houghton 36'; Parris 52'

Nissan Stadium, Nashville, Tennessee
Attendance: 22,125
Referee: Marianela Araya (Costa Rica)

March 5, 2019
17:25 ET

Japan	0–3	England
	Report	Staniforth 12'; Carney 23'; Mead 30'

Raymond James Stadium, Tampa, Florida
Attendance: 8,580
Referee: Christina Unkel (United States)
March 5, 2019
20:20 ET

United States	1–0	Brazil
Heath 20'	Report

Raymond James Stadium, Tampa, Florida
Attendance: 14,009
Referee: Carol Anne Chénard (Canada)

== Goalscorers ==
There were 19 goals scored in 6 matches, for an average of 3.17 goals per match.

2 goals

- (England) Beth Mead
- (Japan) Yuka Momiki
- (United States) Tobin Heath
- (United States) Megan Rapinoe

1 goal

- (Brazil) Andressa Alves
- (Brazil) Debinha
- (England) Karen Carney
- (England) Steph Houghton
- (England) Nikita Parris
- (England) Lucy Staniforth
- (England) Ellen White
- (Japan) Yui Hasegawa
- (Japan) Rikako Kobayashi
- (Japan) Emi Nakajima
- (United States) Alex Morgan
