= 2017 Empress's Cup final =

2017 Empress's Cup Final
Nippon TV Beleza	Nojima Stella Kanagawa Sagamihara
3	0
- Date: December 24, 2017
- Venue: Osaka Nagai Stadium, Osaka

2017 Empress's Cup Final was the 39th final of the Empress's Cup competition. The final was played at Osaka Nagai Stadium in Osaka on December 24, 2017. Nippon TV Beleza won the championship.

== Overview ==
Nippon TV Beleza won their 12th title, by defeating Nojima Stella Kanagawa Sagamihara – with Mina Tanaka and Mizuho Sakaguchi goal.

== Match details ==
December 24, 2017

Nippon TV Beleza	3-0	Nojima Stella Kanagawa Sagamihara
Mina Tanaka 6', 74'; Mizuho Sakaguchi 24'	Report

Osaka Nagai Stadium

== See also ==
- 2017 Empress's Cup
