= 2018 Empress's Cup final =

2018 Empress's Cup Final
Nippon TV Beleza	INAC Kobe Leonessa
4	2
- Date: January 1, 2019
- Venue: Panasonic Stadium Suita, Osaka

2018 Empress's Cup Final was the 40th final of the Empress's Cup competition. The final was played at Panasonic Stadium Suita in Osaka on January 1, 2019. Nippon TV Beleza won the championship.

== Overview ==
Nippon TV Beleza won their 13th title, by defeating INAC Kobe Leonessa 4–2 with Riko Ueki, Yuka Momiki and Mina Tanaka goals.

== Match details ==
January 1, 2019

Nippon TV Beleza	4–2	INAC Kobe Leonessa
Ueki 54'; Momiki 71', 94'; Tanaka 104'	Report	Masuya 42'; Kyokawa 77'

Panasonic Stadium Suita

== See also ==
- 2018 Empress's Cup
