= 2012 Nadeshiko League Cup =

Statistics of Nadeshiko League Cup in the 2012 season.

== Overview ==
Nippon TV Beleza won the championship.

== 2012 ==
=== Qualifying round ===
==== Group A ====
Pos	Team	Pld	W	D	L	GF	GA	GD	Pts
1	INAC Kobe Leonessa	4	4	0	0	11	4	+7	12
2	Albirex Niigata Ladies	4	3	0	1	7	3	+4	9
3	Urawa Reds Ladies	4	1	1	2	6	4	+2	4
4	JEF United Chiba Ladies	4	1	1	2	6	7	−1	4
5	Fukuoka J. Anclas	4	0	0	4	3	15	−12	0

==== Group B ====
Pos	Team	Pld	W	D	L	GF	GA	GD	Pts
1	Nippon TV Beleza	4	4	0	0	19	4	+15	12
2	Iga FC Kunoichi	4	3	0	1	12	4	+8	9
3	Okayama Yunogo Belle	4	2	0	2	9	9	0	6
4	AS Elfen Sayama FC	4	1	0	3	5	11	−6	3
5	Speranza FC Osaka-Takatsuki	4	0	0	4	5	22	−17	0

=== Final round ===
==== Semifinals ====
- INAC Kobe Leonessa 5-1 Iga FC Kunoichi
- Nippon TV Beleza 3-0 Albirex Niigata Ladies

==== Final ====
- INAC Kobe Leonessa 2-3 Nippon TV Beleza
