= 2016 Nadeshiko League Cup =

Statistics of Nadeshiko League Cup in the 2016 season.

== Overview ==
Nippon TV Beleza won the championship.

== Results ==
=== Division 1 ===
==== Qualifying round ====
===== Group A =====
Pos	Team	Pld	W	D	L	GF	GA	GD	Pts
1	Nippon TV Beleza	8	6	2	0	29	1	+28	20
2	JEF United Chiba Ladies	8	5	0	3	10	8	+2	15
3	INAC Kobe Leonessa	8	4	2	2	16	4	+12	14
4	Iga FC Kunoichi	8	2	0	6	6	15	−9	6
5	Konomiya Speranza Osaka-Takatsuki	8	1	0	7	5	38	−33	3

===== Group B =====
Pos	Team	Pld	W	D	L	GF	GA	GD	Pts
1	Vegalta Sendai Ladies	8	5	2	1	11	4	+7	17
2	Urawa Reds Ladies	8	3	4	1	14	10	+4	13
3	AC Nagano Parceiro Ladies	8	4	1	3	17	15	+2	13
4	Albirex Niigata Ladies	8	3	1	4	10	10	0	10
5	Okayama Yunogo Belle	7	0	2	5	4	17	−13	2

==== Final round ====
===== Semifinals =====
- Nippon TV Beleza 4-0 Urawa Reds Ladies
- Vegalta Sendai Ladies 0-1 JEF United Chiba Ladies

===== Final =====
- Nippon TV Beleza 4-0 JEF United Chiba Ladies

=== Division 2 ===
==== Qualifying round ====
===== Group A =====
Pos	Team	Pld	W	D	L	GF	GA	GD	Pts
1	Nojima Stella Kanagawa Sagamihara	8	7	1	0	22	6	+16	22
2	Nippon Sport Science University Fields Yokohama	8	4	1	3	16	13	+3	13
3	Chifure AS Elfen Saitama	8	3	3	2	12	12	0	12
4	Nippatsu Yokohama FC Seagulls	8	3	1	4	14	15	−1	10
5	Sfida Setagaya FC	8	0	0	8	5	23	−18	0

===== Group B =====
Pos	Team	Pld	W	D	L	GF	GA	GD	Pts
1	Cerezo Osaka Sakai Ladies	8	6	0	2	22	9	+13	18
2	AS Harima ALBION	8	5	1	2	11	6	+5	16
3	Ehime FC Ladies	8	4	3	1	17	9	+8	15
4	Angeviolet Hiroshima	8	0	3	5	4	13	−9	3
5	FC Kibi International University Charme	8	0	3	5	6	23	−17	3

==== Final round ====
===== Semifinals =====
- Nojima Stella Kanagawa Sagamihara 1-1 (pen 3-5) AS Harima ALBION
- Cerezo Osaka Sakai Ladies 2-3 Nippon Sport Science University Fields Yokohama

===== Final =====
- AS Harima ALBION 2-0 Nippon Sport Science University Fields Yokohama
