= 2017 Empress's Cup =

Tournament details
- Country: Japan

Final positions
- Champions: NTV Beleza
- Runners-up: Nojima Stella
- Semifinalists: Urawa Red Diamonds; JEF United

The 2017 Empress's Cup was the 39th edition of the Japanese women's football national cup. NTV Beleza won its 11th title and sealed its first League-Cup double since the 2008 season after beating Nadeshiko Division 1 newcomer Nojima Stella in the final. Defending champion INAC Leonessa was defeated on penalties in the Round of 32 by the non-L. League team of the Waseda University.

Round of 32
NTV Beleza | 6
JFA Academy | 0
Sfida Setagaya | 0
JEF United U-18 | 1
Iga Kunoichi | 3
Fukuoka J. Anclas | 0
Albirex Niigata | 4
Sendai University | 1
Urawa Red Diamonds | 8
Nittaidai Fields B | 0
Cerezo Osaka | 2
Fujieda Junshin | 0
Orca Kamogawa | 2
Niigata University | 0
Vegalta Sendai | 2
Speranza Takatsuki | 0
Nagano Parceiro | 3
Bunnys Kioto | 2
Harima ALBION | 3
Tokiwagi Gakuen | 5
Nittaidai Fields | 5
Shikoku Gakuin | 2
JEF United | 3
Angeviolet Hiroshima | 0
Nojima Stella | 1
Loveledge Nagoya | 0
Elfen Saitama | 1
Aichi Toho University | 0
Ehime FC | 0
Waseda University | 1
INAC Leonessa | 5
Yunogo Belle | 0

Round of 16
NTV Beleza | 4
JEF United U-18 | 0
Iga Kunoichi | 2
Albirex Niigata | 4
Urawa Red Diamonds | 2
Cerezo Osaka | 0
Orca Kamogawa | 2
Vegalta Sendai | 4
Nagano Parceiro | 3
Tokiwagi Gakuen | 0
Nittaidai Fields | 2
JEF United | 3
Nojima Stella (p) | 0
Elfen Saitama | 0
Waseda University (p) | 1
INAC Leonessa | 1

Quarterfinals
NTV Beleza | 1
Albirex Niigata | 0
Urawa Red Diamonds(p) | 1
Vegalta Sendai | 1
Nagano Parceiro | 0
JEF United | 1
Nojima Stella | 4
Waseda University | 3

Semifinals
NTV Beleza | 2
Urawa Red Diamonds | 1
JEF United | 0
Nojima Stella | 1

Final
NTV Beleza | 3
Nojima Stella | 0
