= 2018 Nadeshiko League Cup =

Statistics of Nadeshiko League Cup in the 2018 season.

== Division 1 ==
=== Overview ===
Nippon TV Beleza won the championship.

=== Results ===
==== Qualifying round ====
===== Group A =====
Pos	Team	Pld	W	D	L	GF	GA	GD	Pts
1	Nippon TV Beleza	8	7	0	1	23	5	+18	21
2	Urawa Reds Ladies	8	4	3	1	15	9	+6	15
3	Albirex Niigata Ladies	8	2	3	3	13	16	−3	9
4	JEF United Chiba Ladies	8	1	3	4	8	12	−4	6
5	Nippon Sport Science University Fields Yokohama	8	1	1	6	7	24	−17	4

===== Group B =====
Pos	Team	Pld	W	D	L	GF	GA	GD	Pts
1	INAC Kobe Leonessa	8	6	1	1	12	5	+7	19
2	Mynavi Vegalta Sendai Ladies	8	3	3	2	8	4	+4	12
3	Nojima Stella Kanagawa Sagamihara	8	3	1	4	15	11	+4	10
4	AC Nagano Parceiro Ladies	8	3	1	4	7	11	−4	10
5	Cerezo Osaka Sakai Ladies	8	1	2	5	6	17	−11	5

==== Final ====
- Nippon TV Beleza 1-0 INAC Kobe Leonessa

Nippon TV Beleza won the championship.

== Division 2 ==
=== Overview ===
Iga FC Kunoichi won the championship.

=== Results ===
==== Qualifying round ====
===== Group A =====
Pos	Team	Pld	W	D	L	GF	GA	GD	Pts
1	Sfida Setagaya FC	8	5	1	2	16	8	+8	16
2	Orca Kamogawa FC	8	5	0	3	16	8	+8	15
3	Nippatsu Yokohama FC Seagulls	8	4	1	3	8	10	−2	13
4	Chifure AS Elfen Saitama	8	3	1	4	9	11	−2	10
5	Shizuoka Sangyo University Iwata Bonita	8	0	3	5	4	16	−12	3

===== Group B =====
Pos	Team	Pld	W	D	L	GF	GA	GD	Pts
1	Iga FC Kunoichi	8	5	2	1	22	10	+12	17
2	Okayama Yunogo Belle	8	5	0	3	12	14	−2	15
3	AS Harima Albion	8	4	1	3	15	12	+3	13
4	Ehime FC Ladies	8	2	1	5	11	19	−8	7
5	Bunnys Kyoto SC	8	2	0	6	12	17	−5	6

==== Final ====
- Sfida Setagaya FC 1-4 Iga FC Kunoichi

Iga FC Kunoichi won the championship.
