= 2018 Nadeshiko League =

L. League
- Season: 2018
- Champions: NTV Beleza
- AFC Club Championship: NTV Beleza

The 2018 L. League season was the 30th edition of the league since its establishment. NTV Beleza were the defending champions, having won the Division 1 title in each of the previous three seasons.

== Nadeshiko League Division 1 ==
The season began on 21 March 2018 and ended on 3 November 2018.

Nadeshiko League Division 1
- Season: 2018
- Champions: NTV Beleza
- Relegated: Cerezo Osaka Sakai Ladies
- Matches played: 90
- Goals scored: 243 (2.7 per match)
- Biggest home win: INAC Kobe 4–0 Nagano Parceiro; INAC Kobe 4–0 Cerezo Osaka
- Biggest away win: Nittaidai 0–4 NTV Beleza
- Highest scoring: JEF United 3–4 Vegalta Sendai
- All statistics correct as of 25 March 2018.

=== Teams ===
Team	Location	2017 position
AC Nagano Parceiro Ladies	Nagano	6th
Albirex Niigata Ladies	Niigata	5th
Cerezo Osaka Sakai Ladies	Osaka	2nd in Nadeshiko League Division 2 (promoted)
INAC Kobe Leonessa	Kobe	2nd
JEF United Ichihara Chiba Ladies	Ichihara	7th
Nippon Sport Science University Fields Yokohama	Yokohama	1st in Nadeshiko League Division 2 (promoted)
NTV Beleza	Inagi	1st
Nojima Stella Kanagawa Sagamihara	Sagamihara	8th
Urawa Red Diamonds Ladies	Saitama	3rd
Vegalta Sendai Ladies	Sendai	4th

=== Table ===
Pos	Team	Pld	W	D	L	GF	GA	GD	Pts	Qualification or relegation
1	NTV Beleza (C)	18	14	3	1	38	6	+32	45	Qualification to 2019 AFC Women's Club Championship
2	INAC Kobe Leonessa	18	12	4	2	45	11	+34	40	
3	Nojima Stella Kanagawa Sagamihara	18	9	3	6	29	24	+5	30	
4	Urawa Red Diamonds Ladies	18	9	2	7	22	20	+2	29	
5	Albirex Niigata Ladies	18	8	3	7	20	22	−2	27	
6	JEF United Ichihara Chiba Ladies	18	5	8	5	19	19	0	23	
7	AC Nagano Parceiro Ladies	18	6	4	8	22	27	−5	22	
8	Vegalta Sendai Ladies	18	4	3	11	17	39	−22	15	
9	Nippon Sport Science University Fields Yokohama	18	3	4	11	14	33	−19	13	Division 1 promotion/relegation Series
10	Cerezo Osaka Sakai Ladies (R)	18	2	2	14	17	42	−25	8	Relegated to Division 2

(C) Champions; (R) Relegated

== Nadeshiko League Division 2 ==
The season began on 21 March 2018 and ended on 28 October 2018.

Nadeshiko League Div.2 (Division 2)
- Season: 2018
- Champions: Iga FC Kunoichi
- Promoted: Iga FC Kunoichi
- Relegated: Okayama Yunogo Belle
- Matches played: 90
- Goals scored: 222 (2.47 per match)
- All statistics correct as of 15 March 2018.

=== Teams ===
Team	Location	2017 position
AS Harima ALBION	Himeji	7th
Bunnys Kyoto SC	Kyoto	1st in Challenge League West (promoted)
Chifure AS Elfen Saitama	Saitama	9th in Nadeshiko League Division 1 (relegated)
Ehime FC Ladies	Matsuyama	3rd
Iga FC Kunoichi	Iga	10th in Nadeshiko League Division 1 (relegated)
Nippatsu Yokohama FC Seagulls	Yokohama	5th
Okayama Yunogo Belle	Mimasaka	8th
Orca Kamogawa FC	Kamogawa	4th
Shizuoka Sangyo University Iwata Bonita	Iwata	2nd in Challenge League West (promoted)
Sfida Setagaya FC	Setagaya	6th

=== Table ===
Pos	Team	Pld	W	D	L	GF	GA	GD	Pts	Promotion or relegation
1	Iga FC Kunoichi	18	14	2	2	29	6	+23	44	Promoted to Division 1
2	Nippatsu Yokohama FC Seagulls	18	9	4	5	32	24	+8	31	Division 1 promotion/relegation Series
3	Chifure AS Elfen Saitama	18	8	6	4	27	21	+6	30	
4	Orca Kamogawa FC	18	8	4	6	26	24	+2	28	
5	AS Harima ALBION	18	7	4	7	20	19	+1	25	
6	Ehime FC Ladies	18	5	8	5	21	21	0	23	
7	Shizuoka Sangyo University Iwata Bonita	18	4	9	5	20	23	−3	21	
8	Sfida Setagaya FC	18	5	3	10	20	28	−8	18	
9	Bunnys Kyoto SC	18	3	5	10	11	27	−16	14	Division 2 promotion/relegation Series
10	Okayama Yunogo Belle	18	2	5	11	16	29	−13	11	Relegated to Division 3

== Challenge League (Division 3) ==
Challenge League (Division 3)
- Season: 2018
- Matches played: 108
- All statistics correct as of 18 March 2018.

=== Teams ===
==== East ====
Team	Location	2017 Challenge League East position	2017 overall position
FC Jumonji Ventus	Niiza	1st	4th
Niigata University of Health and Welfare LSC	Niigata	4th	8th
Norddea Hokkaido	Sapporo	5th	11th
Tokiwagi Gakuen High School LSC	Sendai	3rd	6th
Tsukuba FC Ladies	Tsukuba	6th	12th
Yamato Sylphid	Yamato	2nd	3rd

==== West ====
Team	Location	2017 Challenge League West position	2017 overall position
Angeviolet Hiroshima	Hiroshima	4th	5th
Cerezo Osaka Sakai Girls	Osaka		1st in Challenge League replacement game (promoted)
FC Kibi International University Charme	Takahashi		9th in Nadeshiko League Division 2 (relegated)
JFA Academy Fukushima LSC	Gotemba	5th	9th
Konomiya Speranza Osaka-Takatsuki	Takatsuki		10th in Nadeshiko League Division 2 (relegated)
NGU Loveledge Nagoya	Nagoya	3rd	7th
