= Nadeshiko League Cup =

- 2019 Nadeshiko League Cup

The Nadeshiko League Cup (Japanese: なでしこリーグカップ) is a cup competition for women's football clubs in Japan. The competition began as the L.League Cup in 1996 and it was abolished after the 1999 edition. It reappeared on the occasion of the 2007 FIFA Women's World Cup, under the name Nadeshiko League Cup. The WE League, a professional women's football league, was launched in 2021, and the Nadeshiko League Cup ended in 2020.

== Results ==
| Season | Winner | Score | Runners-up | Semi-finals | |
L.League Cup
| 1996 | Yomiuri-Seiyu Beleza | 0–0 (4–3 pen.) | Prima Ham F.C. Kunoichi | Suzuyo Shimizu F.C. Lovely Ladies | Matsushita Denki Panasonic Bambina |
| 1997 | Prima Ham F.C. Kunoichi | 3–0 | Yomiuri-Seiyu Beleza | Matsushita Denki Panasonic Bambina | Nikko Securities Dream Ladies |
| 1998 | Prima Ham F.C. Kunoichi | 2–1 | Matsushita Denki Panasonic Bambina | Yomiuri Beleza | OKI F.C. Winds |
| 1999 | NTV Beleza | 2–0 | Prima Ham F.C. Kunoichi | OKI F.C. Winds | Tasaki Perule F.C. |
Nadeshiko League Cup
| 2007 | NTV Beleza | 2–1 | Urawa Red Diamonds Ladies | INAC Leonessa | TEPCO Mareeze |
| 2010 | NTV Beleza | 3–2 | Urawa Red Diamonds Ladies | INAC Kobe Leonessa | TEPCO Mareeze |
| 2012 | NTV Beleza | 3–2 | INAC Kobe Leonessa | Iga F.C. Kunoichi | Albirex Niigata Ladies |
| 2013 | INAC Kobe Leonessa | 3–1 | Okayama Yunogo Belle | NTV Beleza | JEF United Ichihara Chiba Ladies |
| 2016 | NTV Beleza (Division 1) | 4–0 | JEF United Chiba Ladies | Urawa Red Diamonds Ladies | Mynavi Vegalta Sendai Ladies |
| 2016 | AS Harima Albion (Division 2) | 2–0 | Nippon Sport Science University Fields Yokohama | Nojima Stella Kanagawa Sagamihara | Cerezo Osaka Sakai Ladies |
| 2017 | JEF United Chiba Ladies (Division 1) | 1–0 | Urawa Red Diamonds Ladies | NTV Beleza | INAC Kobe Leonessa |
| 2017 | Cerezo Osaka Sakai Ladies (Division 2) | 1–1 (5–4 pen.) | Nippon Sport Science University Fields Yokohama | Sfida Setagaya FC | Okayama Yunogo Belle |
| 2018 | NTV Beleza (Division 1) | 1–0 | INAC Kobe Leonessa | Urawa Red Diamonds Ladies | Mynavi Vegalta Sendai Ladies |
| 2018 | Iga FC Kunoichi (Division 2) | 4–1 | Sfida Setagaya FC | Okayama Yunogo Belle | Orca Kamogawa FC |
| 2019 | NTV Beleza (Division 1) | 3–1 (a.e.t.) | INAC Kobe Leonessa | Urawa Red Diamonds Ladies | Nojima Stella Kanagawa Sagamihara |
| 2019 | Cerezo Osaka Sakai Ladies (Division 2) | 2–1 | Chifure AS Elfen Saitama | NHK Spring Yokohama FC Seagulls | AS Harima Albion |
| 2020 | Cancelled | | | | |
| 2021 | Not Held | | | | |

== See also ==
- WE League
- Empress's Cup
- WE League Cup
