= Mayo Doko =

Japanese football player

Mayo Doko 土光 真代
Personal information
- Full name: Mayo Doko
- Date of birth: May 3, 1996 (age 30)
- Place of birth: Toda, Saitama, Japan
- Height: 1.64 m (5 ft 4 1/2 in)
- Position: Defender

Team information
- Current team: INAC Kobe Leonessa
- Number: 3

Youth career
- 2009–2011: Tokyo Verdy Beleza

Senior career*
Years	Team	Apps	(Gls)
2012–2023	Tokyo Verdy Beleza	57	(1)
2023–	INAC Kobe Leonessa	19	(0)
Total		57	(1)

International career^{‡}
2012	Japan U-20	6	(0)
2018–2021	Japan	5	(0)
Medal record
Nippon TV Beleza
Winner	Nadeshiko League	2015
Winner	Nadeshiko League	2016
Winner	Nadeshiko League	2017
Winner	Nadeshiko League	2018
Runner-up	Nadeshiko League	2012
Runner-up	Nadeshiko League	2013
Runner-up	Nadeshiko League	2014
Winner	Nadeshiko League Cup	2012
Winner	Nadeshiko League Cup	2016
Winner	Nadeshiko League Cup	2018
Winner	Empress's Cup	2014
Winner	Empress's Cup	2017
Winner	Empress's Cup	2018
Representing Japan
FIFA U-20 Women's World Cup
Bronze medal – third place	2012 Japan
AFC U-16 Women's Championship
Gold medal – first place	2011 China
- * Club domestic league appearances and goals as of 9 2023 ‡ National team caps and goals as of 9 2023

Mayo Doko (土光 真代, Dokō Mayo; born May 3, 1996) is a Japanese footballer who plays as a defender. She plays for the INAC Kobe Leonessa in the Japanese WE League. and the Japan national team.

== Club career ==
Doko was born in Toda on May 3, 1996. In 2012, when she was 15 years old, she joined L.League club Nippon TV Beleza from youth team. She played many matches as center back from first season. The club won the championship three years in a row (2015-2017).

== National team career ==
In August 2012, when Doko was 16 years old, she was selected Japan U-20 national team for 2012 U-20 Women's World Cup was held in Japan. At this tournament, she played as center back in all 6 matches and Japan won the 3rd place.

On July 29, 2018, Doko debuted for Japan national team as substitute center back from the 68th minute instead Aimi Kunitake for injury against Brazil.

== National team statistics ==
Japan national team
Year	Apps	Goals
2018	1	0
2019	1	0
2020	2	0
2021	1	0
Total	5	0

== Honours ==
Tokyo Verdy Beleza

- AFC Women's Club Championship: 2019
