= 2017 Nadeshiko League =

L.League
- Season: 2017
- Champions: NTV Beleza

The 2017 L.League season was the 29th edition since its establishment. NTV Beleza were the defending champions, having won the Division 1 title in each of the past two seasons. The season began in March 2017 and ended in October 2017. NTV Beleza won the season, making it their 15th (and 3rd straight) Division 1 title.

== Nadeshiko League Div.1 (Division 1) ==
The season began on 26 March 2017 and ended on 7 October 2017.

Nadeshiko League Div.1 (Division 1)
- Season: 2017
- Champions: NTV Beleza; 15th Nadeshiko League title
- Relegated: Iga FC Kunoichi
- Matches: 90
- Goals: 218 (2.42 per match)
- Top goalscorer: Mina Tanaka (15 goals)
- Biggest home win: Urawa Red Diamonds Ladies 7–0 Chifure AS Elfen Saitama (7 May 2017)
- Biggest away win: Albirex Niigata Ladies 0–4 NTV Beleza (27 May 2017); Vegalta Sendai Ladies 0–4 INAC Kobe Leonessa (9 September 2017); Chifure AS Elfen Saitama 0–4 NTV Beleza (7 October 2017)
- Highest scoring: Urawa Red Diamonds Ladies 7–0 Chifure AS Elfen Saitama (7 May 2017)
- Longest winning run: 9 matches NTV Beleza
- Longest unbeaten run: 9 matches NTV Beleza
- Longest winless run: 7 matches Iga FC Kunoichi
- Longest losing run: 5 matches Nojima Stella Kanagawa Sagamihara
- Highest attendance: 5,460; Albirex Niigata Ladies 2–1 INAC Kobe Leonessa (22 April 2017)
- Lowest attendance: 421; Nojima Stella Kanagawa Sagamihara 1–3 Albirex Niigata Ladies (6 September 2017)
- Total attendance: 129,312
- Average attendance: 1,437
- All statistics correct as of 11 March 2018.

=== Teams ===
Team	Location	2016 position
AC Nagano Parceiro Ladies	Nagano	3rd
Albirex Niigata Ladies	Niigata	5th
Chifure AS Elfen Saitama	Saitama	2nd in Nadeshiko League Division 2 (promoted)
INAC Kobe Leonessa	Kobe	2nd
Iga FC Kunoichi	Iga	6th
JEF United Ichihara Chiba Ladies	Ichihara	7th
Mynavi Vegalta Sendai Ladies	Sendai	4th
NTV Beleza	Inagi	1st
Nojima Stella Kanagawa Sagamihara	Sagamihara	1st in Nadeshiko League Division 2 (promoted)
Urawa Red Diamonds Ladies	Saitama	8th

=== Table ===
Pos	Team	Pld	W	D	L	GF	GA	GD	Pts	Qualification or relegation
1	NTV Beleza	18	15	2	1	39	8	+31	47	Champions
2	INAC Kobe Leonessa	18	12	3	3	31	12	+19	39	
3	Urawa Red Diamonds	18	10	2	6	29	14	+15	32	
4	Mynavi Vegalta Sendai Ladies	18	9	3	6	21	23	−2	30	
5	Albirex Niigata Ladies	18	7	4	7	18	21	−3	25	
6	AC Nagano Parceiro Ladies	18	6	5	7	23	16	+7	23	
7	JEF United Ichihara Chiba Ladies	18	7	1	10	14	23	−9	22	
8	Nojima Stella Kanagawa Sagamihara	18	3	5	10	17	32	−15	14	
9	Chifure AS Elfen Saitama	18	4	2	12	13	40	−27	14	Division 1 promotion/relegation Series
10	Iga FC Kunoichi	18	2	3	13	14	30	−16	9	Relegated to Division 2

=== Results ===
Home \ Away	ALB	BEL	ELF	JEF	KAN	KUN	LEO	PAR	RED	VEG
Albirex Niigata Ladies	—	0–4	1–0	5–1	2–2	0–0	2–1	0–2	1–0	0–1
NTV Beleza	2–0	—	2–1	3–0	0–0	3–2	2–0	1–1	1–0	3–1
Chifure AS Elfen Saitama	0–1	0–4	—	1–1	1–2	2–1	1–2	2–1	2–3	0–1
JEF United Ichihara Chiba Ladies	1–0	0–1	0–1	—	1–0	2–1	0–1	2–1	0–1	1–2
Nojima Stella Kanagawa Sagamihara	2–2	1–2	1–1	0–1	—	1–0	1–3	3–2	0–1	1–3
Iga FC Kunoichi	0–2	0–3	4–0	0–1	1–0	—	2–2	0–0	0–3	2–4
INAC Kobe Leonessa	1–1	1–0	3–0	2–0	3–0	1–0	—	2–0	2–0	1–2
AC Nagano Parceiro Ladies	0–1	1–2	6–0	0–1	3–0	2–0	1–1	—	1–0	1–0
Urawa Red Diamonds Ladies	3–0	0–3	7–0	3–2	4–1	2–0	0–1	0–0	—	0–0
Mynavi Vegalta Sendai Ladies	1–0	0–3	0–1	1–0	2–2	2–1	0–4	1–1	0–2	—

Updated to match(es) played on 7 October 2017. Source: Sportradar
Legend: Blue = home team win; Yellow = draw; Red = away team win.

=== Attendance ===
==== Average home attendances ====
Ranked from highest to lowest average attendance.

Team	GP	Attendance	High	Low	Average
AC Nagano Parceiro Ladies	9	21,793	4,275	1,345	2,421
INAC Kobe Leonessa	9	20,336	4,295	916	2,259
Albirex Niigata Ladies	9	18,525	5,460	696	2,058
Urawa Red Diamonds Ladies	9	16,790	2,305	1,549	1,865
Mynavi Vegalta Sendai Ladies	9	11,772	2,259	626	1,308
Nojima Stella Kanagawa Sagamihara	9	9,474	1,604	421	1,052
NTV Beleza	9	9,264	1,842	579	1,029
JEF United Ichihara Chiba Ladies	9	8,505	2,052	526	945
Iga FC Kunoichi	9	6,673	1,044	537	741
Chifure AS Elfen Saitama	9	6,180	1,211	504	686
Total	90	129,312	5,460	421	1,437

Updated to games played on 7 October 2017.

==== Highest attendances ====
Rank	Home team	Score	Away team	Attendance	Date	Stadium
1	Albirex Niigata Ladies	2–1	INAC Kobe Leonessa	5,460	22 April 2017	Denka Big Swan Stadium
2	Albirex Niigata Ladies	0–1	Mynavi Vegalta Sendai Ladies	5,383	30 September 2017	Denka Big Swan Stadium
3	INAC Kobe Leonessa	3–0	Chifure AS Elfen Saitama	4,295	1 October 2017	Noevir Stadium Kobe
4	AC Nagano Parceiro Ladies	1–1	INAC Kobe Leonessa	4,275	3 May 2017	Minami Nagano Sports Park Stadium
5	INAC Kobe Leonessa	3–0	Nojima Stella Kanagawa Sagamihara	3,259	26 March 2017	Noevir Stadium Kobe
6	AC Nagano Parceiro Ladies	1–0	Urawa Red Diamonds Ladies	3,064	26 March 2017	Minami Nagano Sports Park Stadium
7	AC Nagano Parceiro Ladies	2–0	Iga FC Kunoichi	2,697	7 May 2017	Minami Nagano Sports Park Stadium
8	INAC Kobe Leonessa	1–0	NTV Beleza	2,596	21 May 2017	Noevir Stadium Kobe
9	AC Nagano Parceiro Ladies	6–0	Chifure AS Elfen Saitama	2,525	20 May 2017	Minami Nagano Sports Park Stadium
10	AC Nagano Parceiro Ladies	3–0	Nojima Stella Kanagawa Sagamihara	2,363	30 September 2017	Minami Nagano Sports Park Stadium

Updated to games played on 7 October 2017.

=== Top scorers ===
Rank	Player	Club	Goals
1	(Japan) Mina Tanaka	NTV Beleza	15
2	(Japan) Yuika Sugasawa	Urawa Red Diamonds Ladies	9
3	(Japan) Arisa Minamino	Nojima Stella Kanagawa Sagamihara	8
3	(Japan) Emi Nakajima	INAC Kobe Leonessa	8
5	(Japan) Chinatsu Kira	Urawa Red Diamonds Ladies	7
5	(Japan) Yuka Momiki	NTV Beleza	7
7	(Japan) Sawako Yasumoto	Mynavi Vegalta Sendai Ladies	6
7	(Japan) Kumi Yokoyama	AC Nagano Parceiro Ladies	6
9	(Japan) Riko Ueki	NTV Beleza	5
9	(Japan) Megumi Takase	INAC Kobe Leonessa	5

Updated: 7 October 2017.

=== Awards ===
The awards ceremony took place on 9 October 2017.

Award	Winner	
Best Player Award (MVP)	(Japan) Mizuho Sakaguchi	NTV Beleza
Top Scorer	(Japan) Mina Tanaka	NTV Beleza
Best Young Player Award	(Japan) Yui Fukuta	INAC Kobe Leonessa
Fighting-spirit Award	(Japan) Emi Nakajima	INAC Kobe Leonessa

==== Best XI ====
Pos	Player	Club
GK	(Japan) Ayaka Yamashita	NTV Beleza
DF	(Japan) Aya Sameshima	INAC Kobe Leonessa
DF	(Japan) Risa Shimizu	NTV Beleza
DF	(Japan) Azusa Iwashimizu	NTV Beleza
MF	(Japan) Mizuho Sakaguchi	NTV Beleza
MF	(Japan) Yuka Momiki	NTV Beleza
MF	(Japan) Yui Hasegawa	NTV Beleza
MF	(Japan) Emi Nakajima	INAC Kobe Leonessa
MF	(Japan) Yu Nakasato	NTV Beleza
FW	(Japan) Mina Tanaka	NTV Beleza
FW	(Japan) Yuika Sugasawa	Urawa Red Diamonds Ladies

== Nadeshiko League Div.2 (Division 2) ==
The season began on 25 March 2017 and ended on 7 October 2017.

Nadeshiko League Div.2 (Division 2)
- Season: 2017
- Champions: Nippon Sport Science University Fields Yokohama
- Promoted: Nippon Sport Science University Fields Yokohama; Cerezo Osaka Sakai Ladies
- Relegated: FC Kibi International University Charme; Konomiya Speranza Osaka-Takatsuki
- Matches: 90
- Goals: 256 (2.84 per match)
- Top goalscorer: Saori Takarada (22 goals)
- Biggest home win: Nippon Sport Science University Fields Yokohama 6–0 Konomiya Speranza Osaka-Takatsuki (2 April 2017); Cerezo Osaka Sakai Ladies 8–2 AS Harima Albion (8 April 2017)
- Biggest away win: Konomiya Speranza Osaka-Takatsuki 0–8 Nippon Sport Science University Fields Yokohama (1 October 2017)
- Highest scoring: Cerezo Osaka Sakai Ladies 8–2 AS Harima Albion (8 April 2017)
- Longest winning run: 5 matches Cerezo Osaka Sakai Ladies
- Longest unbeaten run: 11 matches Cerezo Osaka Sakai Ladies
- Longest winless run: 15 matches Konomiya Speranza Osaka-Takatsuki
- Longest losing run: 15 matches Konomiya Speranza Osaka-Takatsuki
- Highest attendance: 2,030; AS Harima Albion 2–1 Sfida Setagaya FC (2 April 2017)
- Lowest attendance: 72; Ehime FC Ladies 5–1 Konomiya Speranza Osaka-Takatsuki (16 September 2017)
- Total attendance: 46,031
- Average attendance: 511
- All statistics correct as of 2 April 2018.

=== Teams ===
Team	Location	2016 position
AS Harima Albion	Himeji	7th
Cerezo Osaka Sakai Ladies	Osaka	3rd
Ehime FC Ladies	Matsuyama	4th
FC Kibi International University Charme	Takahashi	9th
Konomiya Speranza Osaka-Takatsuki	Takatsuki	9th in Nadeshiko League Division 1 (relegated)
Nippatsu Yokohama FC Seagulls	Yokohama	8th
Nippon Sport Science University Fields Yokohama	Yokohama	6th
Okayama Yunogo Belle	Mimasaka	10th in Nadeshiko League Division 1 (relegated)
Orca Kamogawa FC	Kamogawa	1st in Challenge League East (promoted)
Sfida Setagaya FC	Setagaya	5th

=== Table ===
Pos	Team	Pld	W	D	L	GF	GA	GD	Pts	Promotion or relegation
1	Nippon Sport Science University Fields Yokohama	18	13	3	2	44	13	+31	42	Promoted to Division 1
2	Cerezo Osaka Sakai Ladies	18	12	5	1	51	19	+32	41	Division 1 promotion/relegation Series
3	Ehime FC Ladies	18	7	8	3	30	18	+12	29	
4	Orca Kamogawa FC	18	7	7	4	21	12	+9	28	
5	Nippatsu Yokohama FC Seagulls	18	7	3	8	20	22	−2	24	
6	Sfida Setagaya FC	18	6	5	7	30	27	+3	23	
7	AS Harima Albion	18	7	2	9	21	30	−9	23	
8	Okayama Yunogo Belle	18	5	4	9	22	35	−13	19	
9	FC Kibi International University Charme	18	5	3	10	16	32	−16	18	Division 2 promotion/relegation Series
10	Konomiya Speranza Osaka-Takatsuki	18	1	0	17	11	58	−47	3	Relegated to Division 3

=== Attendance ===
==== Average home attendances ====
Ranked from highest to lowest average attendance.

Team	GP	Attendance	High	Low	Average
Okayama Yunogo Belle	9	6,935	1,194	302	770
Orca Kamogawa FC	9	6,828	1,525	539	758
AS Harima Albion	9	6,472	2,030	258	719
Nippatsu Yokohama FC Seagulls	9	5,094	876	338	566
Sfida Setagaya FC	9	5,081	1,815	268	564
Cerezo Osaka Sakai Ladies	9	3,673	684	109	408
FC Kibi International University Charme	9	3,665	902	262	407
Nippon Sport Science University Fields Yokohama	9	2,913	513	180	323
Ehime FC Ladies	9	2,732	618	72	303
Konomiya Speranza Osaka-Takatsuki	9	2,638	528	139	293
Total	90	46,031	2,030	72	511

Updated to games played on 7 October 2017.

==== Highest attendances ====
Rank	Home team	Score	Away team	Attendance	Date	Stadium
1	AS Harima Albion	2–1	Sfida Setagaya FC	2,030	2 April 2017	Himeji Athletic Stadium
2	Sfida Setagaya FC	1–1	Ehime FC Ladies	1,815	10 September 2017	Komazawa Olympic Park Stadium
3	Orca Kamogawa FC	0–1	AS Harima Albion	1,525	14 May 2017	Sodegaura City Athletic Field
4	Okayama Yunogo Belle	2–1	FC Kibi International University Charme	1,194	26 March 2017	Mimasaka Rugby Football Field
5	Okayama Yunogo Belle	0–4	Cerezo Osaka Sakai Ladies	963	3 September 2017	City Light Stadium

Updated to games played on 7 October 2017.

=== Top scorers ===
Rank	Player	Club	Goals
1	(Japan) Saori Takarada	Cerezo Osaka Sakai Ladies	22
2	(Japan) Akane Nagasaki	Sfida Setagaya FC	11
3	(Japan) Kanako Ito	Nippon Sport Science University Fields Yokohama	10
4	(Japan) Shoko Uemura	Nippon Sport Science University Fields Yokohama	8
4	(Japan) Mana Akune	Ehime FC Ladies	8
4	(Japan) Konomi Taniguchi	Konomiya Speranza Osaka-Takatsuki	8
7	(Japan) Shiho Matsubara	Cerezo Osaka Sakai Ladies	7
8	(Japan) Honoka Hayashi	Cerezo Osaka Sakai Ladies	6
8	(Japan) Fumina Katsurama	AS Harima Albion	6
8	(Japan) Misuzu Uchida	AS Harima Albion	6
8	(Japan) Mayu Ikejiri	FC Kibi International University Charme	6

Updated: 7 October 2017.

=== Awards ===
The awards ceremony took place on 9 October 2017.

Award	Winner	
Best Player Award (MVP)	(Japan) Kanako Ito	Nippon Sport Science University Fields Yokohama
Top Scorer	(Japan) Saori Takarada	Cerezo Osaka Sakai Ladies
Best Young Player Award	(Japan) Konomi Taniguchi	Konomiya Speranza Osaka-Takatsuki

== Challenge League (Division 3) ==
Challenge League (Division 3)
- Season: 2017
- Champions: Shizuoka Sangyo University Iwata Bonita
- Promoted: Shizuoka Sangyo University Iwata Bonita; Bunnys Kyoto SC
- Relegated: Fukuoka J. Anclas (withdrawal)
- Matches: 108
- Goals: 287 (2.66 per match)
- Top goalscorer: Yume Takigawa (11 goals)
- Biggest home win: NGU Loveledge Nagoya 5–1 Angeviolet Hiroshima (11 June 2017); Tokiwagi Gakuen High School LSC 6–2 Tsukuba FC Ladies (2 July 2017)
- Biggest away win: Tsukuba FC Ladies 0–6Tokiwagi Gakuen High School LSC (20 May 2017)
- Highest scoring: Tokiwagi Gakuen High School LSC 6–2 Tsukuba FC Ladies (2 July 2017)
- Longest winning run: 5 matches Bunnys Kyoto SC
- Longest unbeaten run: 12 matches Bunnys Kyoto SC
- Longest winless run: 14 matches Tsukuba FC Ladies
- Longest losing run: 5 matches Tsukuba FC Ladies
- All statistics correct as of 2 April 2018.

=== Teams ===
==== East ====
Team	Location	2016 Challenge League East position	2016 overall position
FC Jumonji Ventus	Niiza		1st in Challenge League replacement game (promoted)
Niigata University of Health and Welfare LSC	Niigata	6th	9th
Norddea Hokkaido	Sapporo	3rd	5th
Tokiwagi Gakuen High School LSC	Sendai	4th	8th
Tsukuba FC Ladies	Tsukuba	5th	11th
Yamato Sylphid	Yamato	2nd	2nd

==== West ====
Team	Location	2016 Challenge League West position	2016 overall position
Angeviolet Hiroshima	Hiroshima		10th in Nadeshiko League Division 2 (relegated)
Bunnys Kyoto SC	Kyoto	2nd	4th
Fukuoka J. Anclas	Fukuoka	4th	7th
JFA Academy Fukushima LSC	Gotemba	3rd	6th
NGU Loveledge Nagoya	Nagoya	5th	10th
Shizuoka Sangyo University Iwata Bonita	Iwata	1st	3rd

=== Table ===
==== Regular season ====
===== East =====
Pos	Team	Pld	W	D	L	GF	GA	GD	Pts	Qualification
1	FC Jumonji Ventus	15	9	3	3	23	14	+9	30	Championship playoffs
2	Yamato Sylphid	15	8	3	4	19	12	+7	27	Championship playoffs
3	Tokiwagi Gakuen High School LSC	15	6	4	5	34	25	+9	22	5–8 overall position playoffs
4	Niigata University of Health and Welfare LSC	15	6	3	6	24	25	−1	21	5–8 overall position playoffs
5	Norddea Hokkaido	15	5	3	7	20	19	+1	18	9–12 overall position playoffs
6	Tsukuba FC Ladies	15	1	4	10	10	35	−25	7	9–12 overall position playoffs

===== West =====
Pos	Team	Pld	W	D	L	GF	GA	GD	Pts	Qualification
1	Bunnys Kyoto SC	15	10	3	2	22	9	+13	33	Championship playoffs
2	Shizuoka Sangyo University Iwata Bonita	15	6	5	4	21	17	+4	23	Championship playoffs
3	NGU Loveledge Nagoya	15	6	4	5	23	18	+5	22	5–8 overall position playoffs
4	Angeviolet Hiroshima	15	5	3	7	17	24	−7	18	5–8 overall position playoffs
5	JFA Academy Fukushima LSC	15	4	3	8	18	25	−7	15	9–12 overall position playoffs
6	Fukuoka J. Anclas	15	3	4	8	19	27	−8	13	9–12 overall position playoffs

==== Playoffs ====
===== Championship playoffs =====
Pos	Team	Pld	W	D	L	GF	GA	GD	Pts	Promotion or qualification
1	Shizuoka Sangyo University Iwata Bonita	3	3	0	0	8	1	+7	9	Promoted to Division 2
2	Bunnys Kyoto S.C.	3	2	0	1	5	6	−1	6	Division 2 promotion/relegation Series
3	Yamato Sylphid	3	0	1	2	3	5	−2	1	
4	FC Jumonji Ventus	3	0	1	2	0	4	−4	1	

===== 5–8 overall position playoffs =====
Pos	Team	Pld	W	D	L	GF	GA	GD	Pts
5	Angeviolet Hiroshima	3	2	0	1	4	2	+2	6
6	Tokiwagi Gakuen High School LSC	3	2	0	1	3	2	+1	6
7	NGU Loveledge Nagoya	3	2	0	1	3	3	0	6
8	Niigata University of Health and Welfare LSC	3	0	0	3	1	4	−3	0

===== 9–12 overall position playoffs =====
Pos	Team	Pld	W	D	L	GF	GA	GD	Pts	Qualification
9	JFA Academy Fukushima LSC	3	1	2	0	5	1	+4	5	
10	Fukuoka J. Anclas	3	1	2	0	3	0	+3	5	
11	Norddea Hokkaido	3	1	2	0	2	1	+1	5	Division 3 promotion/relegation Series
12	Tsukuba FC Ladies	3	0	0	3	0	8	−8	0	Division 3 promotion/relegation Series

== Promotion/relegation Series ==
=== Division 1 promotion/relegation Series ===
9 December 2017
13:00

Cerezo Osaka Sakai Ladies	1 – 0	Chifure AS Elfen Saitama
Yakata 19'	Report

J-GREEN Sakai, Sakai
Attendance: 973

16 December 2017
13:00

Chifure AS Elfen Saitama	0 – 3	Cerezo Osaka Sakai Ladies
	Report	Nojima 17'; Matsubara 76'; Takarada 90+2' (pen.)

Kawagoe Stadium, Kawagoe
Attendance: 2,280
- Cerezo Osaka Sakai Ladies are promoted to Division 1.
- Chifure AS Elfen Saitama are relegated to Division 2.

=== Division 2 promotion/relegation Series ===
9 December 2017
13:00

Bunnys Kyoto SC	4 – 2	FC Kibi International University Charme
Matsuda 2' (pen.); Nishikawa 37', 57'; Yoshida 79'	Report	Hemmi 7'; Nishizono 59'

Kyoto Nishikyogoku Athletic Stadium, Kyoto
Attendance: 1,277

17 December 2017
13:00

FC Kibi International University Charme	0 – 1	Bunnys Kyoto SC
	Report	Sato 22'

Tsuyama Stadium, Tsuyama
Attendance: 837
- Bunnys Kyoto SC are promoted to Division 2.
- FC Kibi International University Charme are relegated to Division 3.
