= 2020 Empress's Cup =

Football tournament season

Tournament details
- Dates: 5 December – 29 December 2020
- Teams: 32

Final positions
- Champions: NTV Beleza

Tournament statistics
- Matches played: 31
- Goals scored: 115 (3.71 per match)
- All statistics correct as of 29 December 2020.

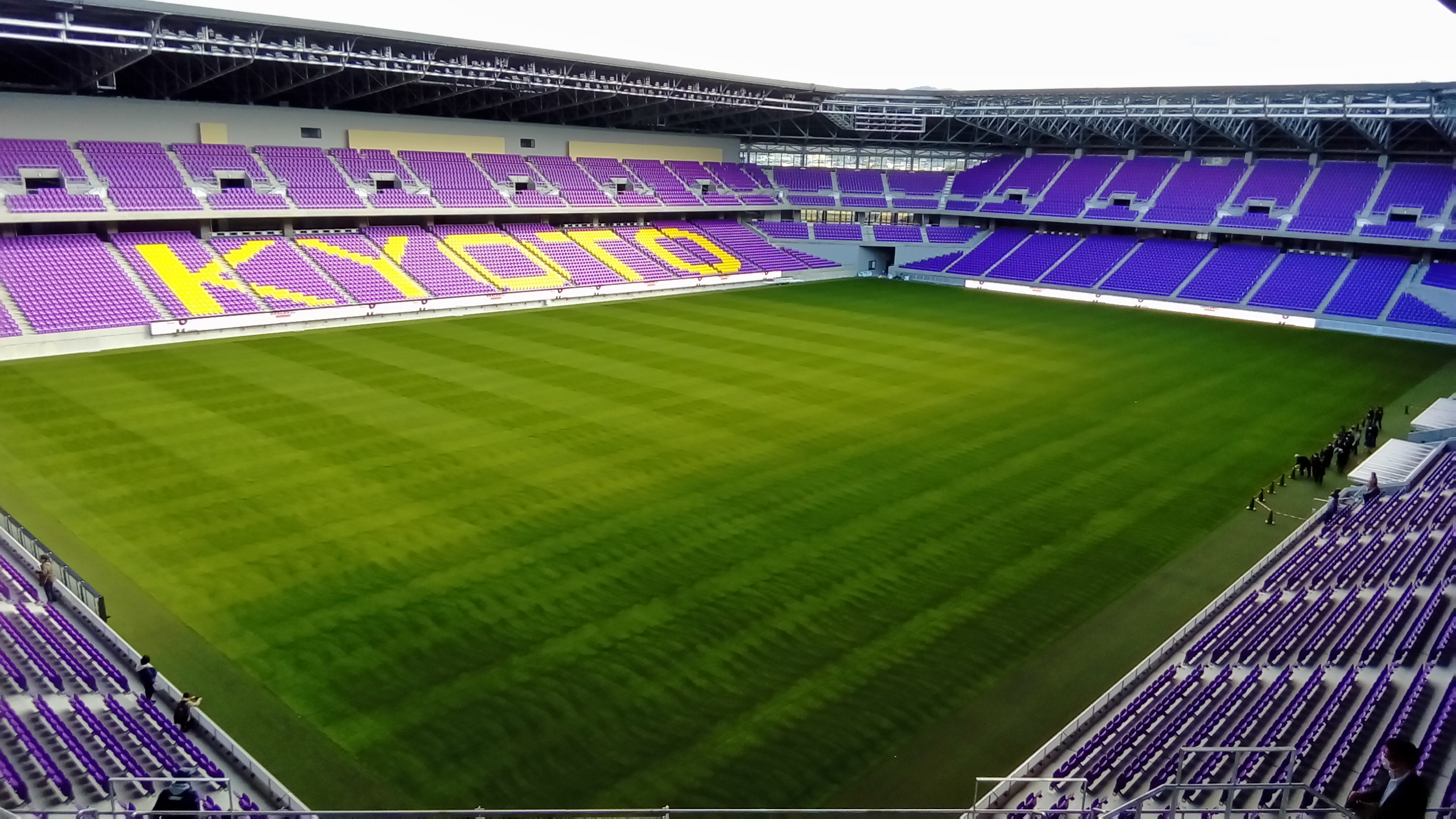
Sanga stadium, where the semi finals and finals were held

The 2020 Empress's Cup was the 42nd season of the Japanese women's football main cup competition. NTV Beleza won the competition after defeating Urawa Red 4–3 at the final, winning their fourth consecutive and 15th overall title.

Matches especially the semi-finals and final were streamed live on JFA TV.

== Calendar and format ==
Below are the dates for each round as given by the official schedule:

Round	Date(s)	Number of fixtures	Clubs
First round	5 & 6 December 2020	16	32 →16
Second round	12 & 13 December 2020	8	16 →8
Quarter-final	19 & 20 December 2020	4	8 →4
Semi-final	24 December 2020	2	4 →2
Final	29 December 2020	1	2 →1

== First round ==
32 teams competed in this round.

Team 1	Score	Team 2
5 December 2020
Kamogawa	4–0	Daisho Gakuen High School
Sfida Setagaya	3–2	Shizuoka Sangyo University
Harima	2–1 (a.e.t.)	Waseda University
Elfen Saitama	1–0	Nittaidai
Iga Kunoichi	11–0	Diosa Izumo
Vegalta Sendai	1–0	Kanagawa University
JEF United	2–0	Fukuoka J. Anclas
Cerezo Osaka	2–1	Speranza Osaka
6 December 2020
Yamato Sylphid	4–1	Imabari
Yokohama	1–0 (a.e.t.)	Nagano Parceiro
Nojima Stella	1–0	Gunma
Ehime	4–1	Okayama SHS
Albirex Niigata	4–0	NGU Loveledge
Urawa Red	5–0	Jumonji Ventus
INAC Kobe	4–0	Norddea Hokkaido
NTV Beleza	3–1	Nitere Menina

== Second round ==
The remaining 16 teams played in this round.

Team 1	Score	Team 2
12 December 2020
JEF United	1–0 (a.e.t.)	Iga Kunoichi
Nojima Stella	2–1	Ehime
Cerezo Osaka	3–0	Elfen Saitama
Urawa Red	2–0	Yamato Sylphid
INAC Kobe	1–0	Orca Kamogawa
NTV Beleza	2–0	Harima
13 December 2020
Albirex Niigata	3–1	Yokohama
Vegalta Sendai	1–1 (a.e.t.) (5–3 (p)	Sfida Setagaya

12 December 2020	JEF United	1–0 (a.e.t.)	Iga Kunoichi	Axis Bird Stadium, Tottori
11:00 UTC+9	Otaki 111'	Report

12 December 2020	Nojima Stella	2–1	Ehime	Tochigi Green Stadium, Utsunomiya
11:00 UTC+9	Hirata 2'; Minamino 62'	Report	Yamaguchi 19'

12 December 2020	Cerezo Osaka	3–0	Elfen Saitama	Miki Athletic Stadium, Miki
11:00 UTC+9	Yakata 17', 84'; Nojima 52'	Report

12 December 2020	Urawa Red	2–0	Yamato Sylphid	Tochigi Green Stadium, Utsunomiya
14:00 UTC+9	Kozue Ando 18', 51'	Report

12 December 2020	INAC Kobe	1–0	Orca Kamogawa	Miki Athletic Stadium, Miki
14:00 UTC+9	Sameshima 33'	Report

12 December 2020	NTV Beleza	2–0	Harima	Axis Bird Stadium, Tottori
14:00 UTC+9	Miura 22'; Kinoshita 90+3'	Report

13 December 2020	Albirex Niigata	3–1	Yokohama	Tochigi Green Stadium, Utsunomiya
11:00 UTC+9	Kawamura 67'; Kono Kaede 75', 88'	Report	Nagashima 37'

13 December 2020	Vegalta Sendai	1–1 (a.e.t.) (5–3 p)	Sfida Setagaya	Tochigi Green Stadium, Utsunomiya
14:00 UTC+9	Arimachi 94'	Report	Takishita 110'
	Penalties
	Arimachi (penalty scored); Kunitake (penalty scored); Hamada (penalty scored); Ono (penalty scored); Manya (penalty scored)		Seno (penalty scored); Misaki (penalty scored); Kaneko (penalty scored); Ayaka (penalty missed)

== Quarter-final ==
Team 1	Score	Team 2
19 December 2020
INAC Kobe	2–3	Albirex Niigata
NTV Beleza	5–0	Nojima Stella
20 December 2020
Urawa Red	3–2	JEF United
Cerezo Osaka	3–3 (a.e.t.) 3–5 (p)	Vegalta Sendai

19 December 2020	INAC Kobe	2–3	Albirex Niigata	Tochigi Green Stadium, Utsunomiya
11:00 UTC+9	Takase 36'; Nakajima 38'	Report	Takikawa 48'; Kawamura 51'; Ishibuchi 53'

19 December 2020	NTV Beleza	5–0	Nojima Stella	Tochigi Green Stadium, Utsunomiya
14:00 UTC+9	Miyazawa 16'; Kobayashi 76', 79', 83'; Endo 82'	Report

20 December 2020	Urawa Red	3–2	JEF United	Yurtec Stadium, Sendai City
11:00 UTC+9	Seike 12'; Shiokoshi 15'; Minami 83'	Report	Ozawa 74'; Setoguchi 77'

20 December 2020	Cerezo Osaka	v (a.e.t.) (3–5 p)	Vegalta Sendai	Yurtec Stadium, Sendai City
14:00 UTC+9	Hamano 65', 104'; Nojima 82'	Report	Hamada 2', 25'; Arimachi 111'
	Penalties
	Takarada (penalty missed); Riko (penalty scored); Kitamura (penalty scored); Koyama (penalty scored)		Hitomi (penalty scored); Hamada (penalty scored); Manya (penalty scored); Sumida (penalty scored); Arimachi (penalty scored)

== Semi-final ==
Team 1	Score	Team 2
NTV Beleza	4–1	Vegalta Sendai
Urawa Red	1–1 (a.e.t.) 5–3 (p)	Albirex Niigata

24 December 2020	NTV Beleza	4–1	Vegalta Sendai	Sanga Stadium, Kameoka
15:00 UTC+9	Endo 26', 57', 79'; Miyazawa 52'	Report	Hamada 85'

24 December 2020	Urawa Red	1–1 (a.e.t.)	Albirex Niigata	Sanga Stadium, Kameoka
18:00 UTC+9	Naomoto 13'	Report	Megumi 24'

== Final ==
The final was played on 29 December 2020 at the Sanga Stadium in Kameoka, Kyoto

Team 1	Score	Team 2
Urawa Red	3–4	NTV Beleza

29 December 2020	Urawa Red	3–4	NTV Beleza	Sanga Stadium, Kameoka
14:00 UTC+9	Takahashi 53'; Sugasawa 69'; Ando 86'	Report	Endo 11'; Miyazawa 41'; Kobayashi 73', 88'
