= Emi Nakajima =

Japanese footballer (born 1990)

Emi Nakajima 中島 依美
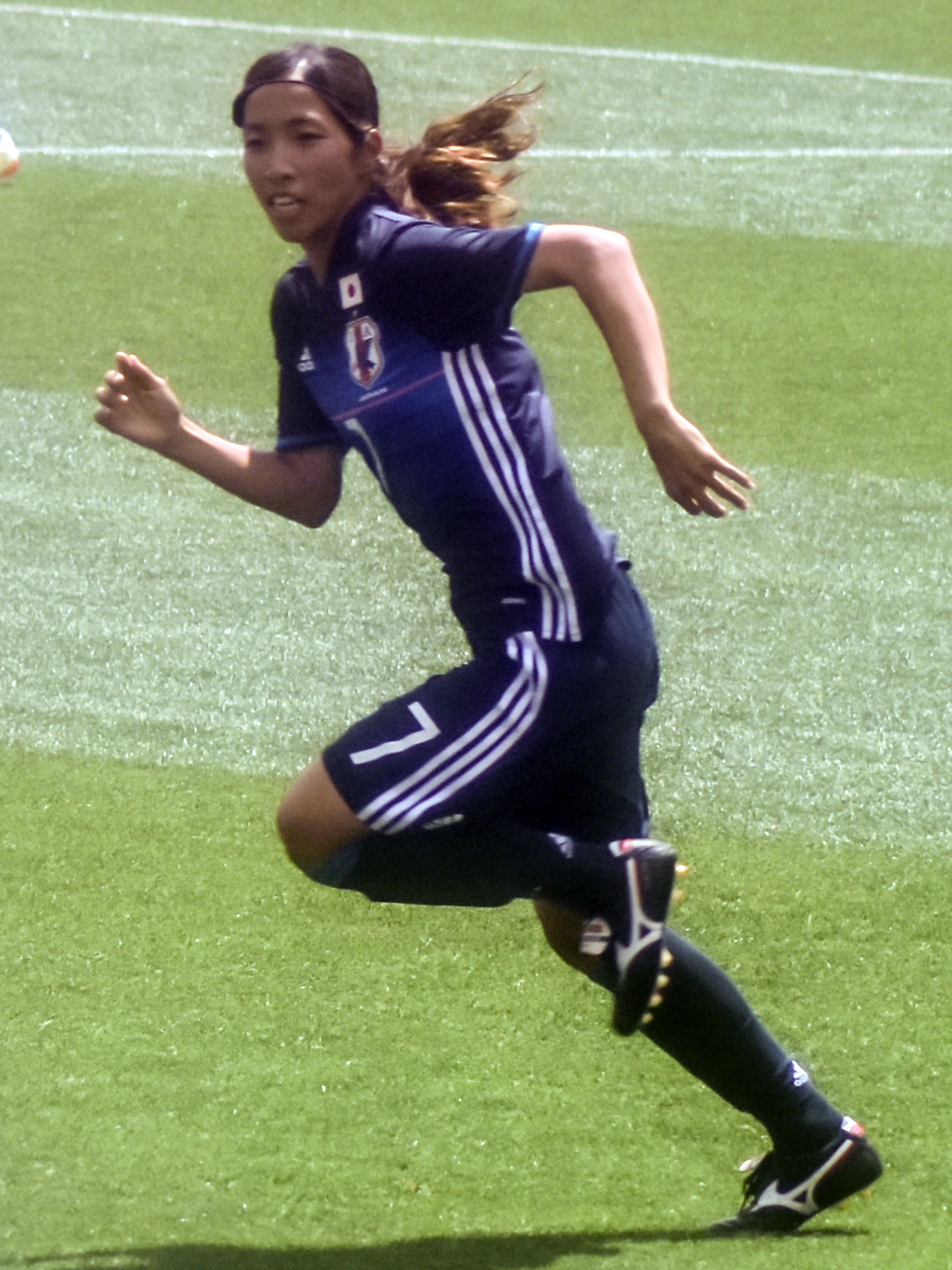
- Nakajima playing for Japan in 2016

Personal information
- Full name: Emi Nakajima
- Date of birth: September 27, 1990 (age 36)
- Place of birth: Yasu, Shiga, Japan
- Height: 1.58 m (5 ft 2 in)
- Position: Midfielder

Team information
- Current team: Gyeongju KHNP WFC
- Number: 35

Youth career
- 2006–2008: Yasu High School

Senior career*
| Years | Team | Apps | (Gls) |
| 2009–2022 | INAC Kobe Leonessa | 221 | (34) |
| 2022–2025 | MyNavi Sendai | 33 | (3) |
| 2025– | Gyeongju KHNP WFC | 0 | (0) |
| Total | | 168 | (30) |

International career
| 2010 | Japan U-20 | 3 | (1) |
| 2011–2021 | Japan | 90 | (14) |
Medal record
INAC Kobe Leonessa
| Winner | Nadeshiko League | 2011 |
| Winner | Nadeshiko League | 2012 |
| Winner | Nadeshiko League | 2013 |
| Runner-up | Nadeshiko League | 2016 |
| Runner-up | Nadeshiko League | 2017 |
| Runner-up | Nadeshiko League | 2018 |
| Winner | Nadeshiko League Cup | 2013 |
| Runner-up | Nadeshiko League Cup | 2012 |
| Runner-up | Nadeshiko League Cup | 2018 |
| Winner | Empress's Cup | 2010 |
| Winner | Empress's Cup | 2011 |
| Winner | Empress's Cup | 2012 |
| Winner | Empress's Cup | 2013 |
| Winner | Empress's Cup | 2015 |
| Winner | Empress's Cup | 2016 |
| Runner-up | Empress's Cup | 2018 |
Representing Japan
AFC Women's Asian Cup
| Gold medal – first place | 2014 Vietnam |
| Gold medal – first place | 2018 Jordan |
Asian Games
| Gold medal – first place | 2018 Jakarta-Palembang | Team |
| Silver medal – second place | 2014 Incheon | Team |
- * Club domestic league appearances and goals as of December 31, 2018

Emi Nakajima (中島 依美, Nakajima Emi; born September 27, 1990) is a Japanese footballer who plays as a midfielder. She plays for Gyeongju KHNP WFC and Japan national team.

== Club career ==
Nakajima was born in Yasu on September 27, 1990. After graduating from high school, she joined INAC Kobe Leonessa in 2009. The club won L.League championship for 3 years in a row (2011-2013). She was also selected Best Eleven in 2013 and 2017.

After 13 years at INAC Kobe, Nakajima transferred to Mynavi Sendai, where she spent three years before moving to WK League club Gyeongju KHNP. She scored the winning goal in the championship final of the 2026 WK League, giving KHNP their first ever WK League title.

== National team career ==
Nakajima was included in Norio Sasaki's Japan U20 national team for the 2010 U20 World Cup in Germany. She appeared in all of Japan's three matches against Mexico, Nigeria and England, scoring one goal in a 3–1 win against England, as Japan were eliminated in the group stage. Nakajima received her first cap for the senior team against United States on May 14, 2011. On July 10, 2013, she was called up to the 2013 East Asian Cup in South Korea. She scored her first goal on July 20 in a 2–0 win against China in the first East Asian Cup final round match. In 2014, she played at 2014 Asian Cup and 2014 Asian Games. Japan won the championship at Asian Cup and 2nd place at Asian Games.

On 19 March 2018, she was called up to the 2018 AFC Women's Asian Cup, where Japan won the championship.

On 10 May 2019, Nakajima was included in the 23-player squad for the 2019 FIFA Women's World Cup.

On 18 June 2021, she was included in the Japan squad for the 2020 Summer Olympics.

== Club statistics ==
As of match played 18 May 2013.

| Club | Season | League | | National Cup | | League Cup | | Total | |
| Club | Season | Apps | Goals | Apps | Goals | Apps | Goals | Apps | Goals |
|---|---|---|---|---|---|---|---|---|---|
| INAC Kobe Leonessa | 2009 | 11 | 1 | 3 | 1 | – | | 14 | 2 |
| INAC Kobe Leonessa | 2010 | 18 | 2 | 4 | 2 | 3 | 0 | 25 | 4 |
| INAC Kobe Leonessa | 2011 | 13 | 1 | 1 | 0 | – | | 14 | 1 |
| INAC Kobe Leonessa | 2012 | 14 | 4 | 4 | 0 | 5 | 1 | 23 | 5 |
| INAC Kobe Leonessa | 2013 | 9 | 1 | | | 10 | 0 | 9 | 1 |
| INAC Kobe Leonessa | Total | 65 | 9 | 12 | 3 | 18 | 1 | 95 | 13 |
| Career total | | 65 | 9 | 12 | 3 | 18 | 1 | 95 | 13 |

== National team statistics ==
Japan national team
| Year | Apps | Goals |
|---|---|---|
| 2011 | 2 | 0 |
| 2012 | 0 | 0 |
| 2013 | 7 | 1 |
| 2014 | 12 | 4 |
| 2015 | 3 | 1 |
| 2016 | 7 | 1 |
| 2017 | 15 | 2 |
| 2018 | 19 | 4 |
| 2019 | 13 | 1 |
| 2020 | 3 | 0 |
| 2021 | 9 | 0 |
| Total | 90 | 14 |

== National team goals ==
=== Under–20 ===
Scores and results list Japan U20's goal tally first.

| # | Date | Venue | Opponent | Score | Result | Competition |
|---|---|---|---|---|---|---|
| 1. | 21 July 2010 | Bielefelder Alm, Bielefeld | England | 1–0 | 3–1 | 2010 FIFA U-20 Women's World Cup |

=== Senior team ===
Scores and results list Japan's goal tally first.

| # | Date | Venue | Opponent | Score | Result | Competition |
|---|---|---|---|---|---|---|
| 1. | 20 July 2013 | Seoul World Cup Stadium, Seoul | China | 2–0 | 2–0 | 2013 EAFF Women's East Asian Cup |
| 2. | 18 May 2014 | Gò Đậu Stadium, Thủ Dầu Một | Jordan | 2-0 | 7-0 | 2014 AFC Women's Asian Cup |
| 3. | 18 May 2014 | Gò Đậu Stadium, Thủ Dầu Một | Jordan | 5-0 | 7-0 | 2014 AFC Women's Asian Cup |
| 4. | 18 September 2014 | Yamagata Park Stadium, Yamagata | Ghana | 5-0 | 5-0 | International friendly |
| 5. | 26 September 2014 | Hwaseong Sports Complex, incheon | Hong Kong | 3-0 | 9-0 | 2014 Asian Games |
| 6. | 4 August 2015 | Wuhan Sports Center, Wuhan | South Korea | 1-0 | 1-2 | 2015 EAFF Women's East Asian Cup |
| 7. | 7 March 2016 | Kincho Stadium, Osaka Prefecture | Vietnam | 4-1 | 6-1 | 2016 AFC Women's Olympic Qualifying Tournament |
| 8. | 22 October 2017 | Nagano U Stadium, Nagano | Switzerland | 1-0 | 2-0 | International friendly |
| 9. | 8 December 2017 | Chiba Soga Football Stadium | South Korea | 2-1 | 3-2 | 2017 EAFF E-1 Football Championship (women) |
| 10. | 28 February 2018 | Estádio Municipal Da Bela Vista | Netherlands | 2-6 | 2-6 | 2018 Algarve Cup |
| 11. | 1 April 2018 | Transcosmos Stadium Nagasaki | Ghana | 4-1 | 7-1 | International friendly |
| 12. | 7 April 2018 | King Abdullah II Stadium | Vietnam | 2-0 | 4-0 | 2018 AFC Women's Asian Cup |
| 13. | 21 August 2018 | Gelora Sriwijaya Stadium | Vietnam | 3-0 | 7-0 | 2018 Asian Games |
| 14. | 27 February 2019 | Talen Energy Stadium, Chester, Pennsylvania | United States | 1–1 | 2–2 | 2019 SheBelieves Cup |

== Honours ==
=== Club ===
INAC Kobe Leonessa

- L.League (2): 2011, 2012
- Empress's Cup (3): 2010, 2011, 2012
- Japan and South Korea Women's League Championship (1): 2012

==== Gyeongju KHNP ====
- WK League: 2026

=== Japan ===
- AFC Women's Asian Cup

Champion: 2014
