= Ayaka Yamashita (footballer) =

Japanese footballer (born 1995)

Ayaka Yamashita 山下 杏也加
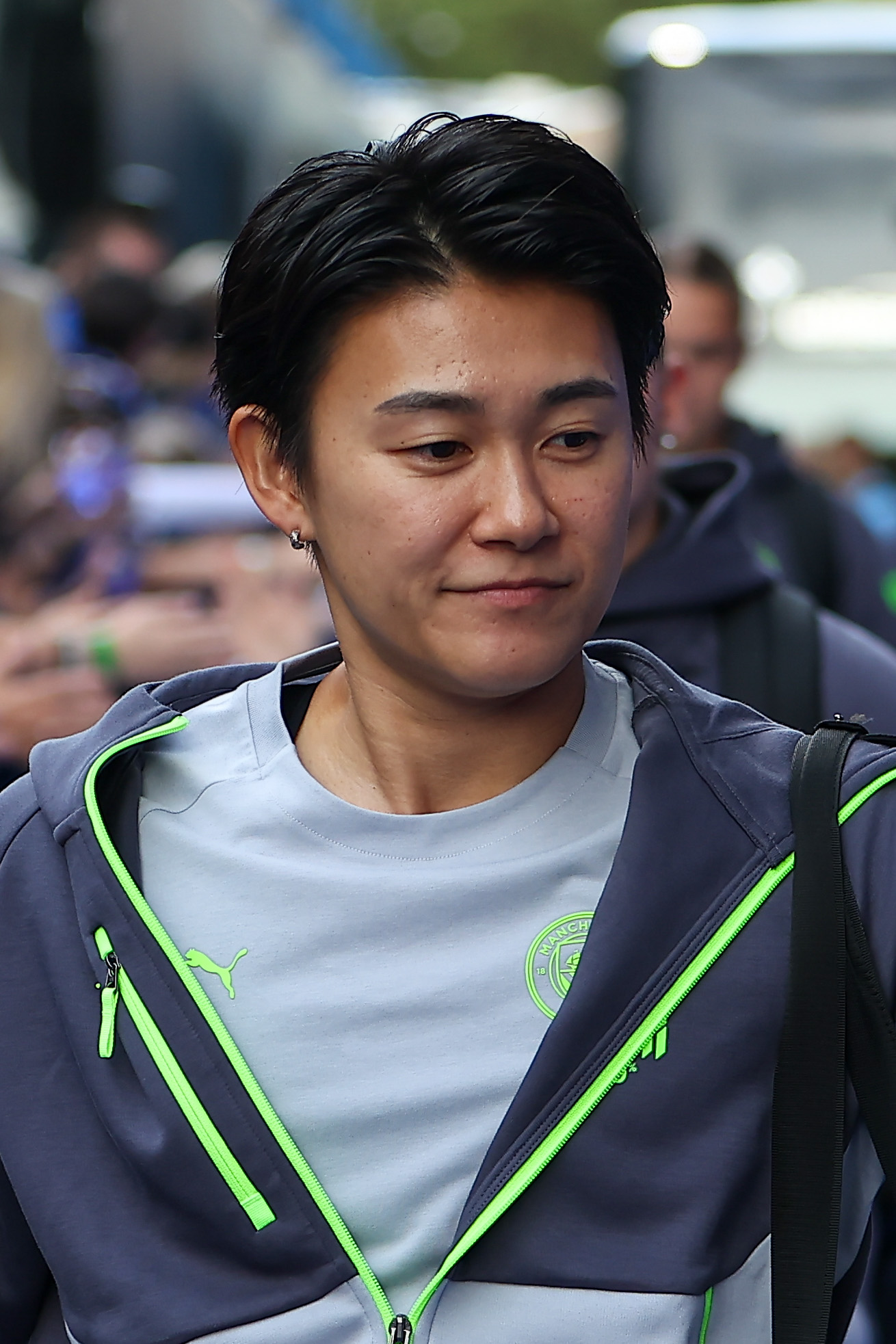
- Yamashita in 2025

Personal information
- Date of birth: September 29, 1995 (age 31)
- Place of birth: Adachi, Tokyo, Japan
- Height: 1.70 m (5 ft 7 in)
- Position: Goalkeeper

Team information
- Current team: Manchester City
- Number: 31

Youth career
- 2011–2013: Murata Girls' High School

Senior career*
Years	Team	Apps	(Gls)
2014–2020	NTV Tokyo Verdy Beleza	109	(0)
2021–2024	INAC Kobe Leonessa	56	(0)
2024–	Manchester City	37	(0)

International career^{‡}
2015–	Japan	91	(0)
Medal record
Women's football
Representing Japan
AFC Women's Asian Cup
Winner	2018 Jordan
Winner	2026 Australia
Asian Games
Gold medal – first place	2018 Jakarta-Palembang	Team
- * Club domestic league appearances and goals as of 22:25, 22 November 2026 (UTC) ‡ National team caps and goals as of 22:55, 18 October 2026 (UTC)

Ayaka Yamashita (山下 杏也加, Yamashita Ayaka; IPA: [jamaꜜɕi̥ta ajaka]; born September 29, 1995) is a Japanese professional footballer who plays as a goalkeeper for Women's Super League club Manchester City and the Japan national team.

== Club career ==
Yamashita was born in Adachi, Tokyo on September 29, 1995. After graduating from high school, she joined Nippon TV Beleza in 2014. The club won L.League championship and she was selected Best Eleven for 3 years in a row from the 2015 season.

On 9 August 2024, Ayaka was signed on a three year deal by Women's Super League club Manchester City. She made her debut for the team in a UEFA Women's Champions League qualifying match win over Paris FC on 18 September 2024.

== International career ==
In August 2015, when Yamashita was 19 years old, she was selected for the Japan national team for the 2015 East Asian Cup. In that competition, on August 4, she debuted against South Korea.

On 19 March 2018, she was called up to the 2018 AFC Women's Asian Cup, where Japan won the championship.

On 10 May 2019, Yamashita was included in the 23-player squad for the 2019 FIFA Women's World Cup. On 18 June 2021, she was included in the Japan squad for the 2020 Summer Olympics.

On 7 January 2022, Yamashita was called up to the 2022 AFC Women's Asian Cup squad. On 13 June 2023, she was included in the 23-player squad for the FIFA Women's World Cup 2023.

On 14 June 2024, Yamashita was included in the Japan squad for the 2024 Summer Olympics. Yamashita was part of the Japan squad that won the 2025 SheBelieves Cup.

Yamashita won the 2026 AFC Women's Asian Cup with her national team after a 1–0 victory over Australia in the final, where she also received the Best Goalkeeper award.

== Career statistics ==
=== Club ===
As of match played 22 November 2026

Appearances and goals by club, season and competition
Club	Season	League			National Cup (Note: Includes Empress's Cup, Women's FA Cup)		League Cup (Note: Includes Nadeshiko League Cup, WE League Cup, FA Women's League Cup)		Continental (Note: Includes AFC Women's Club Championship, UEFA Women's Champions League)		Total	
Club	Season	Division	Apps	Goals	Apps	Goals	Apps	Goals	Apps	Goals	Apps	Goals
Tokyo Verdy Beleza	2014	Nadeshiko League	4	0	4	0	—		—		8	0
Tokyo Verdy Beleza	2015	Nadeshiko League	22	0	3	0	—		—		25	0
Tokyo Verdy Beleza	2016	Nadeshiko League	18	0	4	0	7	0	—		29	0
Tokyo Verdy Beleza	2017	Nadeshiko League	18	0	5	0	6	0	—		29	0
Tokyo Verdy Beleza	2018	Nadeshiko League	17	0	5	0	4	0	—		26	0
Tokyo Verdy Beleza	2019	Nadeshiko League	18	0	2	0	3	0	3	0	26	0
Tokyo Verdy Beleza	2020	Nadeshiko League	12	0	0	0	—		—		12	0
Tokyo Verdy Beleza	Total		109	0	23	0	20	0	3	0	155	0
INAC Kobe Leonessa	2021–22	WE League	19	0	1	0	—		—		20	0
INAC Kobe Leonessa	2022–23	WE League	19	0	4	0	4	0	—		27	0
INAC Kobe Leonessa	2023–24	WE League	18	0	3	0	1	0	—		22	0
INAC Kobe Leonessa	Total		56	0	8	0	5	0	0	0	69	0
Manchester City	2024–25	Women's Super League	10	0	3	0	3	0	5	0	21	0
Manchester City	2025–26	Women's Super League	17	0	1	0	2	0	—		20	0
Manchester City	2026–27	Women's Super League	10	0	0	0	—		5	0	15	0
Manchester City	Total		37	0	4	0	5	0	10	0	56	0
Career Total			202	0	35	0	30	0	13	0	280	0

=== International ===
As of match played 13 October 2026

National team	Year	Apps	Goals
Japan	2015	3	0
Japan	2016	3	0
Japan	2017	5	0
Japan	2018	14	0
Japan	2019	10	0
Japan	2020	2	0
Japan	2021	6	0
Japan	2022	10	0
Japan	2023	11	0
Japan	2024	11	0
Japan	2025	9	0
Japan	2026	7	0
Total		91	0

== Honours ==
Tokyo Verdy Beleza

- Nadeshiko League: 2015, 2016, 2017, 2018, 2019
- Empress's Cup: 2014, 2017, 2018, 2019, 2020
- Nadeshiko League Cup: 2016, 2018, 2019
- AFC Women's Club Championship: 2019

INAC Kobe Leonessa

- WE League: 2021–22

Manchester City

- Women's Super League: 2025–26
- Women's FA Cup: 2025–26

Japan

- AFC Asian Cup: 2018, 2026
- Asian Games: 2018
- SheBelieves Cup: 2025

Individual

- Nadeshiko League Best Eleven: 2015, 2016, 2017, 2018, 2019
- WE League Most Valuable Player: 2021–22
- WE League Best Eleven: 2021–22, 2022–23
- WE League Outstanding Players Award: 2021–22, 2022–23
- AFC Women's Asian Cup Best Goalkeeper: 2026
