= Takeo Matsuda =

Japanese footballer (born 1961)

Takeo Matsuda 松田 岳夫
Personal information
- Date of birth: October 13, 1961 (age 65)
- Place of birth: Tokyo, Japan

Youth career
- 1977–1979: Nihon University High School

College career
Years	Team	Apps	(Gls)
1980–1983	Nihon University		

Senior career*
Years	Team	Apps	(Gls)
1984–1990	Fujitsu		

Managerial career
- 1998–1999: NTV Beleza
- 2005–2008: Nippon TV Beleza
- 2009: Tokyo Verdy
- 2010–2011: Gainare Tottori
- 2012: FC Ryukyu
- 2013–2014: AS Elfen Saitama
- 2015–2017: INAC Kobe Leonessa
- 2019–2020: Fukushima United FC
- 2021-2023: MyNavi Sendai Ladies
- 2023-: Tokyo Verdy Beleza
- * Club domestic league appearances and goals

Takeo Matsuda (松田 岳夫, Matsuda Takeo; born October 13, 1961) is a former Japanese football player and manager currently manager WE League club of Tokyo Verdy Beleza.

== Playing career ==
Matsuda was born in Tokyo on October 13, 1961. After graduating from Nihon University, he played for Fujitsu from 1984 to 1990.

== Coaching career ==
After retirement, Matsuda started coaching career at Verdy Kawasaki (later Tokyo Verdy) in 1992. He mainly coached youth team and Verdy's women team Nippon TV Beleza. He managed Beleza twice and he led Beleza to L.League champions 4 years in a row (2005–2008). He also managed Verdy from October 2009. In 2010, he moved to Japan Football League (JFL) club Gainare Tottori. He led Gainare to JFL champions and Gainare was promoted to J2 League. However the club finished at the 19th place of 20 clubs in 2011 season in J2 and he resigned end of the season. In 2012, he signed with JFL club FC Ryukyu. In 2013, he signed with L.League Division 2 club AS Elfen Saitama. He led Elfen to the 2nd place in 2013 and Elfen was promoted to Division 1. In 2015, he moved to L.League club INAC Kobe Leonessa. INAC won the champions 2015 and 2016 Empress's Cup. In 2018, he moved to Regional Leagues club Tochigi Uva FC and served as assistant coach. In 2019, he signed with J3 League club Fukushima United FC and served as a manager.

== Managerial statistics ==
Update; December 31, 2018

Team	From	To	Record				
Team	From	To	G	W	D	L	Win %
Tokyo Verdy	2009	2009	7	4	2	1	57.14
Gainare Tottori	2011	2011	38	8	7	23	21.05
Fukushima United FC	2019	present					
Total			45	12	9	24	26.67
