= 2016 Nadeshiko League =

Nadeshiko League
- Season: 2016
- Champions: NTV Beleza; 14th Nadeshiko League title
- Relegated: Konomiya Speranza; Okayama Yunogo Belle
- Top goalscorer: Mina Tanaka (18 goals)

The 2016 Nadeshiko League for Japan's women's association football Nadeshiko League was won by NTV Beleza, who have won the title 14 times.

== Nadeshiko League Division 1 ==
=== Result ===
Pos	Team	Pld	W	D	L	GF	GA	GD	Pts	Qualification or relegation
1	NTV Beleza	18	14	2	2	48	8	+40	44	Champions
2	INAC Kobe Leonessa	18	12	1	5	40	19	+21	37	
3	AC Nagano Parceiro Ladies	18	12	1	5	38	34	+4	37	
4	Vegalta Sendai Ladies	18	10	1	7	29	20	+9	31	
5	Albirex Niigata Ladies	18	9	3	6	23	21	+2	30	
6	Iga F.C. Kunoichi	18	6	3	9	14	18	−4	21	
7	JEF United Ichihara Chiba Ladies	18	5	5	8	19	24	−5	20	
8	Urawa Red Diamonds Ladies	18	6	1	11	18	24	−6	19	
9	Konomiya Speranza Osaka-Takatsuki	18	3	2	13	13	46	−33	11	Division 1 promotion/relegation series
10	Okayama Yunogo Belle	18	3	1	14	13	41	−28	10	Relegated to Division 2

Source: RSSSF

=== League awards ===
==== Best player ====
Player	Club
(Japan) Mizuho Sakaguchi	NTV Beleza

==== Top scorers ====
Rank	Scorer	Club	Goals
1	(Japan) Mina Tanaka	NTV Beleza	18
2	(Japan) Kumi Yokoyama	AC Nagano Parceiro Ladies	16
3	(Japan) Mizuho Sakaguchi	NTV Beleza	7
3	(Japan) Yuka Momiki	NTV Beleza	7
3	(Japan) Shinobu Ohno	INAC Kobe Leonessa	7
3	(Japan) Sayaka Oishi	Albirex Niigata Ladies	7

==== Best eleven ====
Pos	Player	Club
GK	(Japan) Ayaka Yamashita	NTV Beleza
DF	(Japan) Saori Ariyoshi	NTV Beleza
DF	(Japan) Tomoko Muramatsu	NTV Beleza
DF	(Japan) Azusa Iwashimizu	NTV Beleza
MF	(Japan) Yuri Kawamura	Vegalta Sendai Ladies
MF	(Japan) Yuka Momiki	NTV Beleza
MF	(Japan) Mizuho Sakaguchi	NTV Beleza
MF	(Japan) Aya Sameshima	INAC Kobe Leonessa
MF	(Japan) Megumi Kamionobe	Albirex Niigata Ladies
FW	(Japan) Mina Tanaka	NTV Beleza
FW	(Japan) Kumi Yokoyama	AC Nagano Parceiro Ladies

==== Best young player ====
Player	Club
(Japan) Hina Sugita	Urawa Red Diamonds Ladies

==== Fighting-spirit award ====
Player	Club
(Japan) Kumi Yokoyama	AC Nagano Parceiro Ladies

== Nadeshiko League Division 2 ==
=== Result ===
Pos	Team	Pld	W	D	L	GF	GA	GD	Pts	Promotion or relegation
1	Nojima Stella Kanagawa Sagamihara	18	14	4	0	47	6	+41	46	Promoted for Division 1
2	Chifure AS Elfen Saitama	18	12	5	1	39	9	+30	41	Division 1 promotion/relegation series
3	Cerezo Osaka Sakai Ladies	18	8	7	3	34	24	+10	31	
4	Ehime F.C. Ladies	18	8	5	5	27	30	−3	29	
5	Sfida Setagaya F.C.	18	6	5	7	24	25	−1	23	
6	Nippon Sport Science University Fields Yokohama	18	5	5	8	24	27	−3	20	
7	AS Harima ALBION	18	5	3	10	17	24	−7	18	
8	Nippatsu Yokohama F.C. Seagulls	18	4	5	9	22	33	−11	17	
9	F.C. Kibi International University Charme	18	5	2	11	18	42	−24	17	Division 2 promotion/relegation series
10	Angeviolet Hiroshima	18	1	3	14	14	46	−32	6	Relegated for Division 3

- Best Player: Saki Oyama, Nojima Stella Kanagawa Sagamihara
- Top scorers: Alisa Minamino, Nojima Stella Kanagawa Sagamihara
- Top scorers: Michelle Pao, Nojima Stella Kanagawa Sagamihara
- Top scorers: Syoko Uemura, Nippon Sport Science University Fields Yokohama
- Best young player: Hikari Takagi, Nojima Stella Kanagawa Sagamihara

== Challenge League (Division 3) ==
=== Regular season ===
==== East ====
Pos	Team	Pld	W	D	L	GF	GA	GD	Pts	Qualification
1	Orca Kamogawa F.C.	15	13	0	2	35	2	+33	39	Championship Playoff
2	Yamato Sylphid	15	10	1	4	29	14	+15	31	Championship Playoff
3	Norddea Hokkaido	15	6	3	6	23	25	−2	21	5–8 Position Playoff
4	Tokiwagi Gakuen High School L.S.C.	15	5	4	6	17	28	−11	19	5–8 Position Playoff
5	Tsukuba F.C. Ladies	15	5	1	9	15	27	−12	16	9–12 Position Playoff
6	Japan Soccer College Ladies	15	1	1	13	9	32	−23	4	9–12 Position Playoff

==== West ====
Pos	Team	Pld	W	D	L	GF	GA	GD	Pts	Qualification
1	Shizuoka Sangyo University Iwata Bonita	15	10	3	2	32	14	+18	33	Championship Playoff
2	Bunnys Kyoto S.C.	15	10	1	4	25	15	+10	31	Championship Playoff
3	JFA Academy Fukushima L.S.C.	15	6	2	7	25	24	+1	20	5–8 Position Playoff
4	Fukuoka J. Anclas	15	5	3	7	24	26	−2	18	5–8 Position Playoff
5	NGU Nagoya F.C. Ladies	15	4	3	8	14	27	−13	15	9–12 Position Playoff
6	Niigata University of Health and Welfare L.S.C.	15	1	6	8	15	29	−14	9	9–12 Position Playoff

=== Season playoffs ===
==== Championship playoff ====
Pos	Team	Pld	W	D	L	GF	GA	GD	Pts	Promotion or qualification
1	Orca Kamogawa F.C.	3	3	0	0	6	2	+4	9	Promoted for Division 2
2	Yamato Sylphid	3	1	1	1	2	2	0	4	Division 2 promotion/relegation series
3	Shizuoka Sangyo University Iwata Bonita	3	1	1	1	3	4	−1	4	
4	Bunnys Kyoto S.C.	3	0	0	3	3	6	−3	0	

==== 5–8 position playoff ====
Pos	Team	Pld	W	D	L	GF	GA	GD	Pts
5	Norddea Hokkaido	3	2	1	0	5	1	+4	7
6	JFA Academy Fukushima L.F.C.	3	2	0	1	6	4	+2	6
7	Fukuoka J. Anclas	3	1	1	1	2	2	0	4
8	Tokiwagi Gakuen High School L.S.C.	3	0	0	3	2	8	−6	0

==== 9–12 position playoff ====
Pos	Team	Pld	W	D	L	GF	GA	GD	Pts	Qualification
9	Niigata University of Health and Welfare L.S.C.	3	3	0	0	8	2	+6	9	
10	NGU Nagoya F.C. Ladies	3	1	1	1	5	4	+1	4	
11	Tsukuba F.C. Ladies	3	1	1	1	1	2	−1	4	Division 3 promotion/relegation series
12	Japan Soccer College Ladies	3	0	0	3	1	7	−6	0	Division 3 promotion/relegation series

- Best Player: Yoshie Matsunaga, Orca Kamogawa F.C.
- Top scorers: Asami Hirano, Shizuoka Sangyo University Iwata Bonita
- Best young player: Shizuka Mitsuhori, Yamato Sylphid

== Promotion/relegation series ==
=== Division 1 promotion/relegation series ===
2016-11-13
14:00

Chifure AS Elfen Saitama	4 - 1	Konomiya Speranza Osaka-Takatsuki

Konosu Stadium

2016-11-20
13:00

Konomiya Speranza Osaka-Takatsuki	0 - 1	Chifure AS Elfen Saitama

Takatsuki Sogo Sport Center
- Chifure AS Elfen Saitama Promoted to Division 1 in 2017 season.
- Konomiya Speranza Osaka-Takatsuki relegated to Division 2 in 2017 season.

=== Division 2 promotion/relegation series ===
2016-12-13
13:00

Yamato Sylphid	0 - 2	F.C. Kibi International University Charme

Yamato Nadeshiko Studiam

2016-12-19
13:00

F.C. Kibi International University Charme	2 - 0	Yamato Sylphid

Tsuyama Athletics Field
- F.C. Kibi International University Charme stays in Division 2 for the 2017 season.
- Yamato Sylphid stays in Division 3 (Challenge League) for the 2017 season.

=== Division 3 promotion/relegation series ===
==== Qualifying round ====
===== Group A =====
Pos	Team	Pld	W	D	L	GF	GA	GD	Pts	Qualification
1	MITO EIKO F.C. Ibaragi Ladies	3	2	1	0	5	1	+4	7	Qualifying Final
2	Nankatsu S.C. Wings	3	2	0	1	4	3	+1	6	Position Final
3	Diosa Izumo F.C.	3	0	2	1	2	3	−1	4 (Note: 2 bonus points?)	
4	INAC Kobe Leoncheena	3	0	1	2	0	4	−4	1	

===== Group B =====
Pos	Team	Pld	W	D	L	GF	GA	GD	Pts	Qualification
1	F.C.Jumonji Ventus	3	2	1	0	3	0	+3	8 (Note: 1 bonus point?)	Qualifying Final
2	Cerezo Osaka Sakai Girls	3	2	1	0	4	1	+3	7	Position Final
3	Nojima Stella Kanagawa Sagamihara Due	3	0	1	2	1	5	−4	2 (Note: 1 bonus point?)	
4	Vicsale Okinawa F.C. Nabiita	3	0	1	2	2	4	−2	1	

===== Position final =====
2016-11-6
10:00

Nankatsu S.C. Wings	2 - 0	Cerezo Osaka Sakai Girls

Tokinosumika Sports Center

===== Qualifying final =====
2016-11-6
13:00

MITO EIKO F.C. Ibaragi Ladies	1 - 1	F.C.Jumonji Ventus
Penalties
	2 – 4

Tokinosumika Sports Center
- MITO EIKO F.C. Ibaragi Ladies will play match with Tsukuba F.C. Ladies (final round A)
- F.C.Jumonji Ventus will play match with Japan Soccer College Ladies (final round B)

==== Final round A ====
2016-11-13
13:00

MITO EIKO F.C. Ibaragi Ladies	2 - 3	Tsukuba F.C. Ladies

Twinfield Mito

2016-11-19
17:00

Tsukuba F.C. Ladies	1 - 1	MITO EIKO F.C. Ibaragi Ladies

Sekisyu Challenge Stadium
- Tsukuba F.C. Ladies Stay Division 3 (Challenge League) in 2017 season.
- MITO EIKO F.C. Ibaragi Ladies Stay Regional League (Kanto League) in 2017 season.

==== Final round B ====
2016-11-13
16:30

F.C.Jumonji Ventus	3 - 2	Japan Soccer College Ladies

Jumonji University

2016-11-20
13:00

Japan Soccer College Ladies	2 - 3	F.C.Jumonji Ventus

Shibatashi ijiminokoen Athletic Stadium
- F.C.Jumonji Ventus promoted to Division 3 (Challenge League) in 2017 season.
- Japan Soccer College Ladies relegated to Regional League (Hokushinetsu League) in 2017 season.

== See also ==
- Empress's Cup
- Football in Japan
- List of football clubs in Japan
