= Mizuho Sakaguchi =

Japanese footballer (born 1987)

Mizuho Sakaguchi 阪口 夢穂
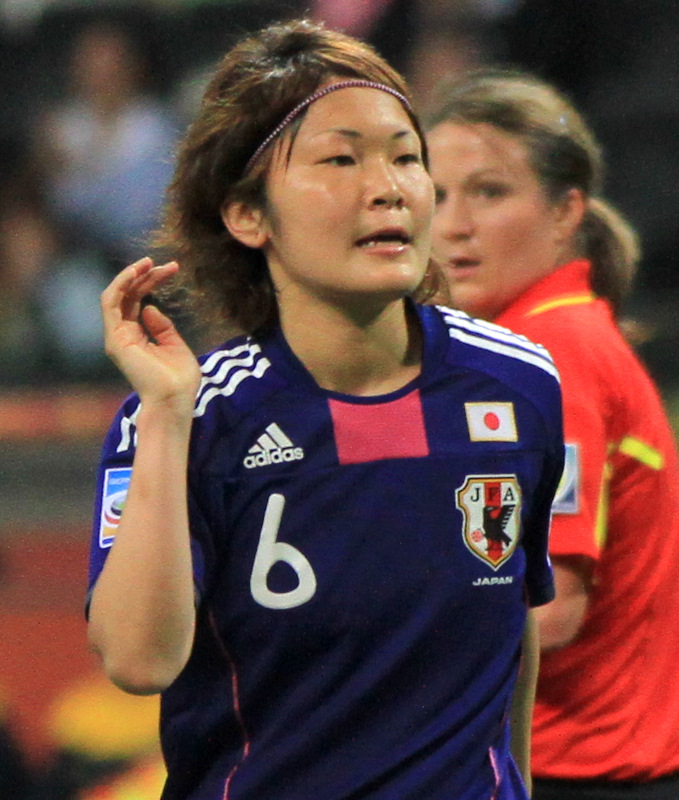
- Sakaguchi playing in the 2011 World Cup

Personal information
- Full name: Mizuho Sakaguchi
- Date of birth: October 15, 1987 (age 39)
- Place of birth: Sakai, Osaka, Japan
- Height: 1.65 m (5 ft 5 in)
- Position: Midfielder

Senior career*
Years	Team	Apps	(Gls)
2003–2004	Speranza FC Takatsuki	21	(7)
2006–2008	Tasaki Perule FC	56	(15)
2009	FC Indiana	2	(1)
2010–2011	Albirex Niigata	28	(10)
2012–2020	Tokyo Verdy Beleza	117	(42)
2021–2022	Omiya Ardija Ventus	2	(0)

International career
2006–2019	Japan	124	(29)
Medal record
Tasaki Perule FC
Runner-up	Nadeshiko League	2007
Winner	Empress's Cup	2006
Runner-up	Empress's Cup	2007
Albirex Niigata
Runner-up	Empress's Cup	2011
Nippon TV Beleza
Winner	Nadeshiko League	2015
Winner	Nadeshiko League	2016
Winner	Nadeshiko League	2017
Winner	Nadeshiko League	2018
Runner-up	Nadeshiko League	2012
Runner-up	Nadeshiko League	2013
Runner-up	Nadeshiko League	2014
Winner	Nadeshiko League Cup	2012
Winner	Nadeshiko League Cup	2016
Winner	Nadeshiko League Cup	2018
Winner	Empress's Cup	2014
Winner	Empress's Cup	2017
Winner	Empress's Cup	2018
Representing Japan
Olympic Games
Silver medal – second place	2012 London	Team
FIFA Women's World Cup
Gold medal – first place	2011 Germany
Silver medal – second place	2015 Canada
AFC Women's Asian Cup
Gold medal – first place	2014 Vietnam
Gold medal – first place	2018 Jordan
Bronze medal – third place	2008 Vietnam
Asian Games
Gold medal – first place	2010 Guangzhou	Team
Silver medal – second place	2006 Doha	Team
Silver medal – second place	2014 Incheon	Team
- * Club domestic league appearances and goals as of December 31, 2018

Mizuho Sakaguchi (阪口 夢穂, Sakaguchi Mizuho; born October 15, 1987) is a former Japanese footballer who played as a midfielder. She last played for Omiya Ardija Ventus in the WE League and the Japan national team.

== Club career ==
Sakaguchi was born in Sakai on October 15, 1987. In 2003, at the age of 15, she debuted in the L.League at Speranza FC Takatsuki. After graduating from high school, she joined Tasaki Perule FC in 2006. She was selected Best Eleven in 2007. However, the club was disbanded in 2008 due to financial strain. She went to the United States and joined USL W-League club FC Indiana in 2009. In 2010, she returned to Japan and joined Albirex Niigata. She was selected Best Eleven in 2011. In 2012, she moved to Nippon TV Beleza. She was selected MVP awards for 3 years in a row (2015-2017). She was also selected Best Eleven for 5 years in a row (2013-2017).

== National team career ==
In July 2006, Sakaguchi was selected to be on the Japan national team for the 2006 Asian Cup. At this competition, on July 19, she debuted and scored 2 goals against Vietnam. She played in the 2011 World Cup where Japan won the championship; Sakaguchi scored one of the penalties in the shootout against United States in the final. She also played in the 2015 World Cup where Japan came second. She was also part of the silver medal-winning 2012 Summer Olympic team. From June 2016, she was given the number 10 shirt for Japan by new manager Asako Takakura. She played 124 games and scored 29 goals for Japan until 2018.

== Career statistics ==
=== Club ===
As of match played 29 June 2022

Appearances and goals by club, season and competition
Club	Season	League			National cup		League cup		Total	
Club	Season	Division	Apps	Goals	Apps	Goals	Apps	Goals	Apps	Goals
Speranza FC Takatsuki	2003	Nadeshiko League	9	1	0	0	—		9	1
Speranza FC Takatsuki	2004	Nadeshiko League	12	6	0	0	—		12	6
Speranza FC Takatsuki	Total		21	7	0	0	—		21	7
Tasaki Perule FC	2006	Nadeshiko League	16	4	4	1	—		20	5
Tasaki Perule FC	2007	Nadeshiko League	20	7	4	0	0	0	24	7
Tasaki Perule FC	2008	Nadeshiko League	20	4	3	0	—		23	4
Tasaki Perule FC	Total		56	15	11	1	0	0	67	16
FC Indiana	2009	USL W-League	2	1	—		—		2	1
Albirex Niigata	2010	Nadeshiko League	12	4	3	0	4	3	19	7
Albirex Niigata	2011	Nadeshiko League	16	6	4	1	—		20	7
Albirex Niigata	Total		28	10	7	1	4	3	39	14
Nippon TV Beleza	2012	Nadeshiko League	10	2	0	0	4	1	14	3
Nippon TV Beleza	2013	Nadeshiko League	17	6	2	1	9	4	28	11
Nippon TV Beleza	2014	Nadeshiko League	28	13	4	0	0	0	32	13
Nippon TV Beleza	2015	Nadeshiko League	23	10	4	0	0	0	27	10
Nippon TV Beleza	2016	Nadeshiko League	18	7	4	1	8	3	30	11
Nippon TV Beleza	2017	Nadeshiko League	18	3	5	3	6	2	29	8
Nippon TV Beleza	2018	Nadeshiko League	3	1	1	0	0	0	4	1
Nippon TV Beleza	2019	Nadeshiko League	0	0	0	0	0	0	0	0
Nippon TV Beleza	2020	Nadeshiko League	8	0	2	0	0	0	10	0
Nippon TV Beleza	Total		125	42	25	5	27	10	177	57
Omiya Ardija Ventus	2021–22	WE League	4	0	0	0	0	0	4	0
Career total			236	75	43	7	31	13	310	95

=== International ===
As of match played 21 April 2018

Appearances and goals by national team and year
National team	Year	Apps	Goals
Japan	2006	7	10
Japan	2007	5	3
Japan	2008	17	1
Japan	2009	0	0
Japan	2010	4	1
Japan	2011	14	1
Japan	2012	14	1
Japan	2013	7	1
Japan	2014	17	8
Japan	2015	12	2
Japan	2016	6	0
Japan	2017	13	0
Japan	2018	8	1
Total		124	29

Scores and results list Japan's goal tally first, score column indicates score after each Sakaguchi goal.

List of international goals scored by Mizuho Sakaguchi
No.	Date	Venue	Opponent	Score	Result	Competition	Ref.
1	July 19, 2006	Hindmarsh Stadium	Vietnam	3–0	5–0	2006 AFC Women's Asian Cup	
2	July 19, 2006	Hindmarsh Stadium	Vietnam	4–0	5–0	2006 AFC Women's Asian Cup	
3	July 21, 2006	Hindmarsh Stadium	Chinese Taipei	6–1	11–1	2006 AFC Women's Asian Cup	
4	July 21, 2006	Hindmarsh Stadium	Chinese Taipei	10–1	11–1	2006 AFC Women's Asian Cup	
5	November 30, 2006	Al-Arabi Stadium, Doha	Jordan	5–0	13–0	2006 Asian Games	
6	November 30, 2006	Al-Arabi Stadium, Doha	Jordan	6–0	13–0	2006 Asian Games	
7	November 30, 2006	Al-Arabi Stadium, Doha	Jordan	7–0	13–0	2006 Asian Games	
8	November 30, 2006	Al-Arabi Stadium, Doha	Jordan	9–0	13–0	2006 Asian Games	
9	November 30, 2006	Al-Arabi Stadium, Doha	Jordan	11–0	13–0	2006 Asian Games	
10	December 4, 2006	Al-Gharafa Stadium, Al-Rayyan	Thailand	1–0	4–0	2006 Asian Games	
11	February 14, 2007	Cyprus	Scotland	1–0	2–0	Friendly	
12	February 14, 2007	Cyprus	Scotland	2–0	2–0	Friendly	
13	August 12, 2007	National Olympic Stadium (Tokyo)	Thailand	5–0	5–0	Football at the 2008 Summer Olympics – Women's qualification	
14	March 10, 2008	Dasaki Stadium	Russia	1–0	3–1	2008 Cyprus Cup	
15	November 14, 2010	Huangpu Sports Center, Guangzhou	Thailand	3–0	4–0	2010 Asian Games	
16	September 3, 2011	Jinan Olympic Sports Center	South Korea	1–0	2–1	Football at the 2012 Summer Olympics – Women's Asian Qualifiers	
17	August 6, 2012	Wembley Stadium	France	2–0	2–1	2012 Summer Olympics	
18	September 26, 2013	Chiba Soga Football Stadium	Nigeria	2–0	2–0	Friendly	
19	May 18, 2014	Gò Đậu Stadium	Jordan	3–0	7–0	2014 AFC Women's Asian Cup	
20	May 18, 2014	Gò Đậu Stadium	Jordan	6–0	7–0	2014 AFC Women's Asian Cup	
21	September 13, 2014	Yamagata Park Stadium	Ghana	2–0	5–0	Friendly	
22	September 18, 2014	Namdong Asiad Rugby Field, Incheon	Jordan	3–0	12–0	2014 Asian Games	
23	September 18, 2014	Namdong Asiad Rugby Field, Incheon	Jordan	4–0	12–0	2014 Asian Games	
24	September 18, 2014	Namdong Asiad Rugby Field, Incheon	Jordan	11–0	12–0	2014 Asian Games	
25	September 22, 2014	Munhak Stadium, Incheon	Chinese Taipei	1–0	3–0	2014 Asian Games	
26	September 29, 2014	Football Stadium, Incheon	Vietnam	1–0	3–0	2014 Asian Games	
27	June 23, 2015	BC Place	Netherlands	2–0	2–1	2015 FIFA Women's World Cup	
28	November 29, 2015	Kras Stadion	Netherlands	1–2	1–3	Friendly	
29	April 13, 2018	Amman International Stadium, Amman	Australia	1–0	1–1	2018 AFC Women's Asian Cup	

== Honours ==
Tasaki Perule FC

- Empress's Cup: 2007

Japan

- FIFA Women's World Cup: 2011; Runner-up: 2015
- Asian Games: 2010; Silver Medal 2006
- EAFF Women's Football Championship: 2008
- AFC Women's Asian Cup

Champion: 2014

Individual

- L.League Best Eleven: 2007, 2011, 2013

== See also ==
- List of women's footballers with 100 or more caps
