= Tokyo Verdy Beleza =

- Full name: Nippon TV Tokyo Verdy Beleza
- Nickname: Beleza
- Founded: 1981; 45 years ago
- Ground: Ajinomoto Field Nishigaoka
- Capacity: 10,000
- Owner: Tokyo Verdy Holdings
- Chairman: Hideyuki Hanyu
- Manager: Takeo Matsuda
- League: WE League
- 2025–26: 3rd
- Website: https://www.verdy.co.jp/beleza/
Home colours	Away colours

Tokyo Verdy Beleza, known officially as Nippon TV Tokyo Verdy Beleza (日テレ・東京ヴェルディベレーザ, Nittere Tōkyō Verudi Berēza) (Note: "W League Regulations, Chapter 3, Article 22" (revised on 22 November 2023)) for sponsorship reasons, is a women's professional football team that plays in Japan's WE League. It is based in the Kita, Itabashi, Inagi, Hino, Tama, and Tachikawa wards of Tokyo.

They have won 52 major Asian and national titles, the most of any team in the WE League. They have produced many players for the women's national team, youth national team and other teams in Japan and abroad.

== History ==
The club was founded as the women's team of Yomiuri SC (currently Tokyo Verdy) by Yomiuri Shimbun in 1981 and named Yomiuri SC Ladies Beleza. Its team name, "Beleza", is Portuguese for "beauty". It was a founding member of the Nadeshiko League (the Japan Women's Football League) in 1989 and is the only Japanese women's club to have never been relegated. In 1999, the club was transferred to Nippon Television and the club name was changed to NTV Beleza. In 2000, the team name was changed to Nippon TV Beleza. In September 2009, Nippon TV withdrew from management. However, the club signed a new contract for naming rights with Nippon TV, and since 2020 its name has been Nippon TV Tokyo Verdy Beleza. The team joined the WE League for the 2021-2022 season as a founding member.

- 1981: Founded as the women's team of Yomiuri Soccer Club, the predecessor of Tokyo Verdy, Yomiuri Soccer Club Women's Beleza. Participated in the Tokyo League Division 2. Initially, the team was created for female fans of Yomiuri Club with the aim of "getting closer to the players", but by providing full-scale coaching, the team aimed to popularise and improve women's football. In 1984, the team was promoted to the Tokyo League Division 1. The team has participated in the Empress's Cup All-Japan Women's Football Championship since the 5th tournament (1983).
- 1989: When the Japan Women's Football League was launched, the team participated as one of the founding members (6 clubs). They won the opening match against Shimizu FC Ladies (9 September). In this first season, they came second behind Shimizu FC Ladies. (Note: They tied with Shimizu FC with 17 points (8 wins, 1 draw, 1 loss), but were behind them on goal difference.)
- 1990: From the second season, Beleza won four consecutive championships, and with players such as Akemi Noda, Asako Takakura, Takako Tezuka, Shiho Onodera, and Nami Otake, they were always competitors for the championship in the season and the All-Japan Women's Football Championship.
- 1994: They signed a sponsorship contract with Seiyu and changed their name to Yomiuri Seiyu Beleza.
- 1998: The sponsorship contract with Seiyu was terminated and the name was changed to Yomiuri Beleza.
- 1999: The sponsor changed to NTV FC, a wholly owned subsidiary of Nippon Television Network Corporation. (Note: This was due to Yomiuri Shimbun increasing its investment in Verdy.) The name was changed to NTV Beleza.
- 2000: When Nippon Television Network changed its logo and introduced a new corporate identity to unify the abbreviation to "NTV", the team became NTV Beleza ( NTV FC became a joint venture with Inagi City and others in 2001). During this time, Beleza had not won the league since 1994, but the Nikko Securities Dream Ladies, who had won three consecutive league titles in 10th season in 1998, were disbanded at the end of the same year, and Prima Ham FC Kunoichi, who won the 11th season in 1999, was reorganised and downsized as Iga FC Kunoichi in 2000, which marked the so-called "winter period of women's football". (Note: What was particularly serious was that the Japanese national team missed out on qualifying for the 2000 Sydney Olympics after being eliminated in the group stage at the 1999 FIFA Women's World Cup, in which eight Beleza players, including Otake, Sakai, and Sawa, participated.) In the 12th season, they won their first championship in seven years. They won the league three times in a row until the 2002 season.
- 2004: Homare Sawa, Eriko Arakawa, Yoe Sakai (who changed her name to Yoe Kato after her marriage in 2007), and Yayoi Kobayashi were selected for the Athens Olympics women's football team (Nadeshiko Japan), and played key roles in supporting the team.
- 2005: Naoko Kawakami transferred from Tasaki Perule FC. The team won the L-League for the first time in three years with an undefeated record of 18 wins and 3 draws in 21 matches, and also won the Sunny Country Okayama National Athletic Meet (Note: The National Sports Festival is usually held on a prefecture-by-prefecture basis, but it does not necessarily have to be a "selected team" made up of players from multiple clubs and schools within the prefecture; individual teams can also participate. In 2005, Tokyo (Beleza) and several other prefectures participated as individual teams.) and the Empress's Cup All-Japan Women's Football Championship. This was the first time in the history of Japanese women's soccer that a single team had won a de facto triple crown without losing a single match. (Note: Tasaki also achieved the "triple crown" of the league, the National Athletic Meet, and the All-Japan Women's Championship in 2003, but at that time it was a mixed team that also included players from the Takarazuka Bunnys Ladies Soccer Club at the National Athletic Meet.) They also won the Nadeshiko Super Cup, held before the season, in a penalty shootout, making them the strongest club in the league with a "quadruple crown".
- 2006: The team suffered their first league defeat in two years in the final league match against Tasaki Perule, but won all three playoff matches to win consecutive championships. They became the first team to win the "100 Million Yen Tiara" that was created that year.
- 2007: They won their 10th league championship of the season, and also won the Nadeshiko Super Cup, Nadeshiko League Cup (established that year), and the 29th All-Japan Women's Football Championship, to achieve a "quadruple crown."
- 2008: With players called up to the Japan Women's National Team for the Beijing Olympics, the FIFA U-20 Women's World Cup, and the FIFA U-17 Women's World Cup, it was a difficult season with many injuries, but the team came together to win their fourth consecutive league championship and the 30th All-Japan Women's Football Championship.
- 21 October 2009: Nippon Television sold its shares in Nippon Television Football Club (later changing its name to Tokyo Verdy 1969 Football Club), which operated Beleza, to an outside company, and withdrew from managing the club. However, Nippon Television retained the naming rights to the team, and the team name remained "Nippon Television Beleza".
- 2010: Verdy was temporarily placed under J.League management after falling into a serious management crisis. The crisis was averted by the formation of a new management team with Buddy Planning Research Institute as the largest shareholder. However, further cost-cutting measures were taken, and Beleza, which won the league championship for the first time in two years that year, did not renew the contracts of professional players Homare Sawa (Note: Sawa played for Washington Freedom in the US Women's Professional Soccer (WPS) league in 2009 and 2010, returning to Beleza at the end of each season, so she played in few matches.) and Shinobu Ohno, the season's top scorer. As a result, four players, including Chika Yukari and Chiaki Minamiyama, who were Nadeshiko members despite being amateur players, left Beleza and all transferred to INAC Kobe Leonessa, which had won the 32nd All-Japan Women's Football Championship that year and was managed by Kei Hoshikawa, who had been fired as Beleza manager in July 2010. In 2010, Yuki Nagasato transferred to an overseas league in January before the start of the season, and Rumi Utsugi in July, while Eriko Arakawa transferred to Urawa Red Diamonds Ladies in March, and Mai Nakaji retired after the season ended in December, meaning that many of Beleza's home-grown main players had left the club.
- 2011: Akemi Noda, who had been the new coach since November of the previous year, continued to lead the team, and the team was able to integrate veterans such as Nadeshiko Japan member Azusa Iwashimizu , (Note: Of the eight Beleza players who played for the 2008 Beijing Olympics and the five who played for the 2010 Asian Games, Iwashimizu is the only one who remained with Beleza in 2011.) Yayoi Kobayashi, and Kanako Ito with young forwards such as Mana Iwabuchi, Asano Nagasato, and Nanase Kiryu. Although the team missed out on consecutive league titles, they finished second behind INAC Kobe Leonessa. Iwashimizu was a key player in the team's first FIFA Women's World Cup victory in 2011 and their qualification for the main tournament in the London Olympics qualifiers, and she began to attract a lot of attention from the media. In October, Beleza signed a professional contract with Iwashimizu until January 2015, and Iwashimizu was assigned to the club production department in preparation for future participation in club management. Iwabuchi also played in the World Cup and Nagasato in the Olympic qualifiers, gaining experience that would help improve the team's strength. At the end of the year, in the 33rd All-Japan Women's Football Championship, they lost to Albirex Niigata Ladies in the semi-finals. (Note: The winners were INAC Kobe Leonessa.)
- 2012: On 9 September, they defeated INAC Kobe in the final of the Nadeshiko League Cup 2012 to win the tournament for the third time in a row. In November, they participated in the first International Women's Club Championship as League Cup winners and placed third in the tournament.
- 2015: On 1 January, they defeated Urawa in the Empress's Cup final to win their 11th championship in five years. They also won the Nadeshiko League for the first time since 2010.
- 2016: On 3 September, they defeated JEF United Chiba Ladies in the Nadeshiko League Cup final to win their first championship in four years. They also won their second consecutive Nadeshiko League championship.
- 2017: They won their third consecutive Nadeshiko League championship. In the Empress's Cup, they defeated Nojima Stella Kanagawa Sagamihara in the final to win their 12th championship in three tournaments.
- 2018: They won the Nadeshiko League for the fourth consecutive year and the Nadeshiko League Cup for the fifth time in two years. They also won the Empress's Cup the following year, defeating INAC Kobe in the final, achieving a triple crown of domestic titles.
- 2019: They won the Nadeshiko League for the fifth consecutive year, and the Nadeshiko League Cup for the sixth time in two consecutive years. They also won the Empress's Cup, beating Urawa Red Diamonds Ladies in the final, achieving a triple crown of domestic titles. They also won the AFC Women's Club Championship, achieving a quadruple title in the year.
- 2020: They won the Empress's Cup for the third consecutive year. They announced that they would change their team name to Nippon TV Tokyo Verdy Beleza and have a new team emblem. On 15 October, they were approved to join the new WE League, which would be launched in 2021.
- 2021-22 season: They lost to Urawa at home in the opening game of the WE League, and lost to Chiba L in the quarterfinals of the Empress's Cup, missing out on their fourth consecutive Empress's Cup victory, and finished without a title for the first time in eight years.
- 2022–23 season: In the WE League Cup final, they were trailing 3-0 to Urawa and lost 2-4 on penalties, finishing as runners-up, but defeated INAC Kobe 4-0 in the Empress's Cup final to win their 16th title in two tournaments.
- In the 2024-25 season, they beat JEF United Chiba 3-0 on the last day of the season. In the WE League, that made them tied with INAC Kobe Leonessa on points and superior on goal difference, thus causing them to win the league for the first time since its inception in 2021.

== Kits ==
=== Kit suppliers and shirt sponsors ===
Period	Kit manufacturer	Shirt sponsor (chest)	Shirt sponsor (sleeve)
2021–2022	Athleta	Task force	Nippon TV
2022–present	Athleta	Coca-Cola Bottlers Japan	Nippon TV

== Stadium ==
Nippon TV Tokyo Verdy Beleza play their home matches at Ajinomoto Field Nishigaoka.

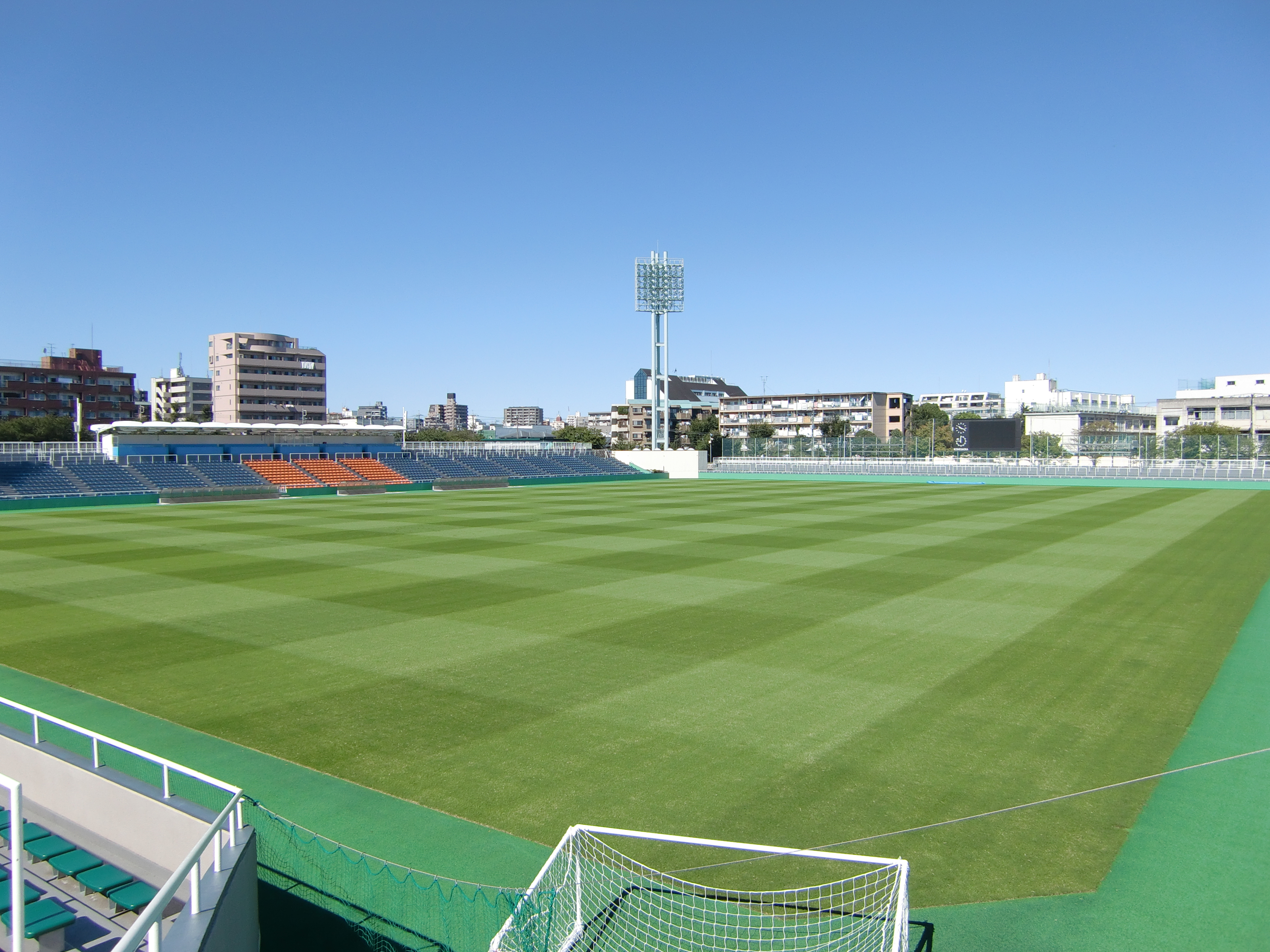
Ajinomoto Field Nishigaoka

== Youth teams ==
Nippon TV Tokyo Verdy Menina is Beleza's football academy. Players such as Aya Miyama and Karina Maruyama have been on its roster.

Tokyo Verdy Menina currently plays in the Kantō League Div. 1 (Division 3).

== Other sports ==
Verdy is a multi-sport club and also fields teams in volleyball and triathlon. Nippon TV Tokyo Verdy Beleza's men's football team is Tokyo Verdy. The club plays in the J1 League, the first tier of football in the country.

Founded as Yomiuri FC in 1969, Tokyo Verdy is one of the most decorated clubs in the J.League, with honours including 2 J.League titles, 5 Emperor's Cups, 6 JSL Cup / J.League Cups and an Asian Club Championship title, and the most successful team in Japanese football history with 25 titles.

The club was an original member ("Original Ten") (Note: The Original Ten of the J.League in 1992 were Kashima Antlers, Urawa Red Diamonds, JEF United Ichihara, Verdy Kawasaki, Yokohama Marinos, Yokohama Flügels, Shimizu S-Pulse, Nagoya Grampus Eight, Gamba Osaka and Sanfrecce Hiroshima.) of the J.League in 1993.

== Coaching staff ==
As of 23 October 2024

Position	Name
Manager	(Japan) Takeo Matsuda
Head coach	(Japan) Koji Seki
Analysis and assistant coach	(Japan) Yusuke Miyachi
Goalkeeping coach	(Japan) Kazuya Nakamura

=== Managerial history ===
Dates	Name
1989–1996	(Japan) Kazuhiko Takemoto
1997	(Japan) Eiji Mori
1998–1999	(Japan) Takeo Matsuda
2000–2001	(Japan) Maki Osuga
2002–2004	(Japan) Masashi Miyamura
2005–2008	(Japan) Takeo Matsuda
2009–2010	(Japan) Kei Hoshikawa
2010	(Japan) Eiji Mori
2010–2012	(Japan) Akemi Noda
2013–2014	(Japan) Mayumi Teratani
2015–2017	(Japan) Eiji Mori
2018–2020	(Japan) Masato Nagata
2021–2023	(Japan) Kazuhiko Takemoto
2023–present	(Japan) Takeo Matsuda

== Players ==
=== Current squad ===
As of 19 July 2025.

Note: Flags indicate national team as defined under FIFA eligibility rules; some limited exceptions apply. Players may hold more than one non-FIFA nationality.

No.	Pos.	Nation	Player
1	GK	JPN	Momoko Tanaka
2	DF	JPN	Miharu Kobayashi
3	DF	JPN	Tomoko Muramatsu
4	DF	JPN	Satsuki Miura
5	DF	JPN	Shino Matsuda
7	MF	JPN	Nanami Kitamura
8	MF	JPN	Oto Kanno
11	FW	JPN	Maya Hijikata
13	MF	JPN	Sana Kimura
14	MF	JPN	Miharu Shinjo
17	DF	JPN	Nana Kashimura
18	MF	JPN	Kokona Iwasaki

No.	Pos.	Nation	Player
19	FW	JPN	Yuzuki Yamamoto
20	FW	JPN	Rikako Kobayashi
21	GK	JPN	Jessica Yuri Wulf
22	DF	JPN	Yukina Sakabe
23	FW	JPN	Rihona Ujihara
25	FW	SGP	Danelle Tan Li Ern
26	DF	JPN	Yuna Aoki
27	FW	JPN	Moka Hiwatari
29	MF	JPN	Miyu Matsunaga
30	DF	JPN	Rumi Utsugi
31	GK	JPN	Nina Noda
33	DF	JPN	Azusa Iwashimizu

=== Notable players ===
GK

- (Japan) Ayaka Yamashita (2014–2020)

DF

- (Japan) Yukari Kinga (2003–2010)
- (Japan) Risa Shimizu (2013–2022)

MF

- (Japan) Asako Takakura (1985–1998)
- (Japan) Akemi Noda (1989–2004)
- (Japan) Homare Sawa (1991–1998, 2004–2010)
- (Japan) Aya Miyama (1999–2000)
- (Japan) Mami Yamaguchi (2003–2004, 2010)
- (Japan) Mizuho Sakaguchi (2012–2020)
- (Japan) Yui Hasegawa (2013–2021)
- (Japan) Jun Endo (2018-2021)
- (Japan) Narumi Miura (2016-2023)
- (Japan) Hinata Miyazawa (2018-2020)
- (Japan) Aoba Fujino (2021-2024)

FW

- (Japan) Shinobu Ohno (1999–2010)
- (Japan) Yūki Nagasato (2001–2009)
- (Japan) Mana Iwabuchi (2007–2012)
- (Japan) Mina Tanaka (2011–2019)
- (Japan) Rico Ueki (2016–2023)

== Honours ==
=== Continental ===
- AFC Women's Club Championship
  - Champions (1): 2019

=== Regional ===
- Japan and South Korea Women's League Championship
  - Champions (1): 2011

=== Domestic ===
NTV Beleza has attained the domestic treble (winning the Nadeshiko League, League Cup, and Empress's Cup) thrice: 2007, 2018 and 2019.

- WE League
  - Champions (1): 2024–25
- Nadeshiko League Division 1
  - Champions (17): 1990, 1991, 1992, 1993, 2000, 2001, 2002, 2005, 2006, 2007, 2008, 2010, 2015, 2016, 2017, 2018, 2019 (record)
  - Runners-up (12): 1989, 1994, 1997, 1998, 1999, 2003, 2004, 2009, 2011, 2012, 2013, 2014
- Empress's Cup
  - Champions (16): 1987, 1988, 1993, 1997, 2000, 2004, 2005, 2007, 2008, 2009, 2014, 2017, 2018, 2019, 2020, 2022 (record)
  - Runners-up (6): 1986, 1991, 1992, 1996, 2002, 2003,
- WE League Cup
  - Champions (1): 2025–26
  - Runners-up (1): 2022–23
- Nadeshiko League Cup
  - Champions (8): 1996, 1999, 2007, 2010, 2012, 2016, 2018, 2019 (record)
  - Runners-up (1): 1997
- Nadeshiko Super Cup
  - Champions (2): 2005, 2007 (record)
  - Runners-up (1): 2006

== Season-by-season records ==
Seasons of Nippon TV Tokyo Verdy Beleza
Season	Domestic League				Empress's Cup	WE/Nadeshiko League Cup	AFC Club Championship
Season	League	Div.	Pos.	Teams	Empress's Cup	WE/Nadeshiko League Cup	AFC Club Championship
1981	Tokyo Prefectural League		—	—	Semi-finals	—	—
1982	Tokyo Prefectural League		—	—	Semi-finals	—	—
1983	Tokyo Prefectural League		—	—	Semi-finals	—	—
1984	Tokyo Prefectural League		—	—	Semi-finals (3rd)	—	—
1985	Tokyo Prefectural League		—	—	Quarter-finals	—	—
1986	Tokyo Prefectural League		—	—	Runners-up	—	—
1987	Tokyo Prefectural League		—	—	Winners	—	—
1988	Tokyo Prefectural League		—	—	Winners	—	—
1989	JLSL	1	2nd	6	Quarter-finals	—	—
1990	JLSL	1	Champions	6	Semi-finals	—	—
1991	JLSL	1	Champions	10	Runners-up	—	—
1992	JLSL	1	Champions	10	Runners-up	—	—
1993	JLSL	1	Champions	10	Winners	—	—
1994	L.League	1	2nd	10	Semi-finals	—	—
1995	L.League	1	5th	10	Semi-finals	—	—
1996	L.League	1	3rd	10	Runners-up	Winners	—
1997	L.League	1	2nd	10	Winners	Runners-up	—
1998	L.League	1	2nd	10	Quarter-finals	Semi-finals	—
1999	L.League	1	2nd	8	Semi-finals	Winners	—
2000	L.League	1	Champions	9	Winners	—	—
2001	L.League	1	Champions	10	Semi-finals	—	—
2002	L.League	1	Champions	11	Runners-up	—	—
2003	L.League	1	2nd	13	Runners-up	—	—
2004	L.League 1 (L1)	1	2nd	8	Winners	—	—
2005	L.League 1 (L1)	1	Champions	8	Winners	—	—
2006	Nadeshiko League Division 1	1	Champions	8	Semi-finals	—	—
2007	Nadeshiko League Division 1	1	Champions	8	Winners	Winners	—
2008	Nadeshiko League Division 1	1	Champions	8	Winners	—	—
2009	Nadeshiko League Division 1	1	2nd	8	Winners	—	—
2010	Nadeshiko League	1	Champions	10	Third round	Winners	—
2011	Nadeshiko League	1	2nd	9	Semi-finals	—	—
2012	Nadeshiko League	1	2nd	10	Quarter-finals	Winners	—
2013	Nadeshiko League	1	2nd	10	Quarter-finals	Semi-finals	—
2014	Nadeshiko League	1	2nd	10	Winners	—	—
2015	Nadeshiko League Division 1	1	Champions	10	Semi-finals	—	—
2016	Nadeshiko League Division 1	1	Champions	10	Semi-finals	Winners	—
2017	Nadeshiko League Division 1	1	Champions	10	Winners	Semi-finals	—
2018	Nadeshiko League Division 1	1	Champions	10	Winners	Winners	—
2019	Nadeshiko League Division 1	1	Champions	10	Winners	Winners	Winners
2020	Nadeshiko League Division 1	1	3rd	10	Winners	—	—
2021–22	WE League	1	3rd	11	Quarter-finals	—	—
2022–23	WE League	1	3rd	11	Winners	Runners-up	—
2023-24	WE League	1	3rd	12	Quarter-finals	—	—
2024-25	WE League	1	Champions	12	Group stage	Semi-finals	—
Victories			18		16	8	1

=== Record in Asian club tournament ===
The club championship in Asia was the AFC Women's Club Championship from 2019–2023 and the AFC Women's Champions League from 2024 on.

All scores list Tokyo Verdy Beleza's goal tally first.

Season	Round	Opponent	Score	Placement
2019	Round-robin tournament	(China) Jiangsu Suning	1–1	Winners
2019	Round-robin tournament	(South Korea) Incheon Hyundai Steel Red Angels	2–0	Winners
2019	Round-robin tournament	(Australia) Melbourne Victory	5–0	Winners
2025–26	Group stage	(North Korea) Naegohyang	4–0	1st
2025–26	Group stage	(Myanmar) ISPE	1–0	1st
2025–26	Group stage	(South Korea) Suwon	0–0	1st
2025–26	Quarter-finals	(Philippines) Stallion Laguna	5–0	
2025–26	Semi-finals	(Australia) Melbourne City	3–1	
2025–26	Final	(North Korea) Naegohyang	0–1	

== Transition of team name ==
- Yomiuri SC Ladies Beleza: 1981–1991
- Yomiuri Nippon SC Ladies Beleza: 1992–1993
- Yomiuri-Seiyu Beleza: 1994–1997
- Yomiuri Beleza: 1998
- NTV Beleza: 1999
- Nippon TV Beleza: 2000–2019
- Nippon TV Tokyo Verdy Beleza: 20 January 2020 – present

== See also ==
- Japan Football Association (JFA)
- 2022–23 in Japanese football
- List of women's football clubs in Japan
