= Mayu Funada =

Japanese footballer

Personal information
- Date of birth: 9 November 1990 (age 35)
- Place of birth: Tokyo Prefecture, Japan
- Height: 1.66 m (5 ft 5 in)
- Position: Goalkeeper

Team information
- Current team: INAC Kobe Leonessa
- Number: 21

Senior career*
Years	Team	Apps	(Gls)
2013–2021	JEF United Chiba Ladies	0	(0)
2021–2023	Chifure AS Elfen Saitama	5	(0)
2023–	INAC Kobe Leonessa	0	(0)
- * Club domestic league appearances and goals

Mayu Funada (born 9 November 1990) is a Japanese professional footballer who plays as a goalkeeper for WE League club INAC Kobe Leonessa.

== Club career ==
Funada made her WE League debut on 12 September 2021.
