= Yui Fukuta =

Japanese association football player

Personal information
- Date of birth: 20 May 1998 (age 28)
- Place of birth: Aichi Prefecture, Japan
- Height: 1.65 m (5 ft 5 in)
- Position: Midfielder

Team information
- Current team: Nagano Parceiro
- Number: 8

Senior career*
Years	Team	Apps	(Gls)
2017-2019	INAC Kobe Leonessa	14	(1)
2020-2022	MyNavi Sendai	25	(1)
2022-	Nagano Parceiro	8	(0)
- * Club domestic league appearances and goals

Yui Fukuta (born 20 May 1998) is a Japanese professional footballer who plays as a midfielder for WE League club AC Nagano Parceiro Ladies.

== Club career ==
Fukuta made her WE League debut on 18 September 2021.
