= Azusa Iwashimizu =

Japanese footballer (born 1986)

Azusa Iwashimizu 岩清水 梓
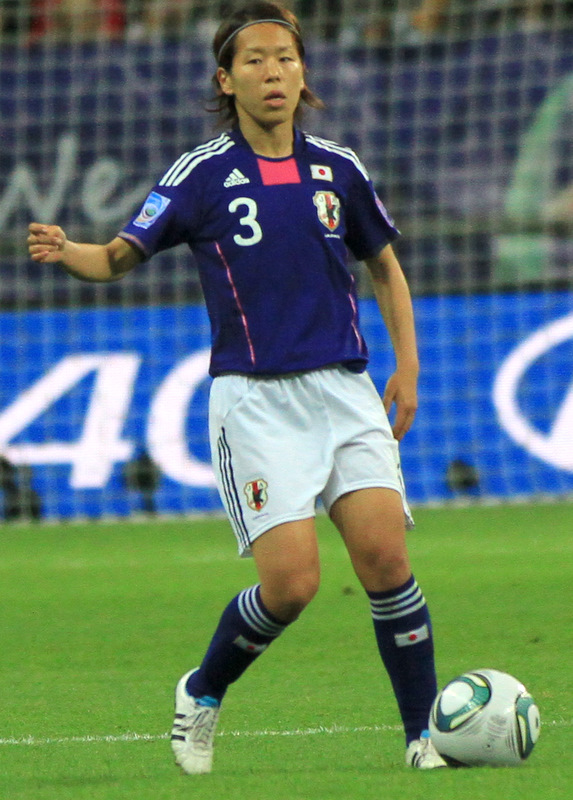

Personal information
- Full name: Azusa Iwashimizu
- Date of birth: 14 October 1986 (age 40)
- Place of birth: Takizawa, Iwate, Japan
- Height: 1.63 m (5 ft 4 in)
- Position: Defender

Youth career
- 1999–2002: Tokyo Verdy Beleza

Senior career*
Years	Team	Apps	(Gls)
2003–2026	Tokyo Verdy Beleza	278	(21)
Total		278	(21)

International career
2006–2016	Japan	122	(11)
Medal record
Nippon TV Beleza
Winner	Nadeshiko League	2005
Winner	Nadeshiko League	2006
Winner	Nadeshiko League	2007
Winner	Nadeshiko League	2008
Winner	Nadeshiko League	2010
Winner	Nadeshiko League	2015
Winner	Nadeshiko League	2016
Winner	Nadeshiko League	2017
Winner	Nadeshiko League	2018
Runner-up	Nadeshiko League	2003
Runner-up	Nadeshiko League	2004
Runner-up	Nadeshiko League	2009
Runner-up	Nadeshiko League	2011
Runner-up	Nadeshiko League	2012
Runner-up	Nadeshiko League	2013
Runner-up	Nadeshiko League	2014
Winner	Nadeshiko League Cup	2007
Winner	Nadeshiko League Cup	2010
Winner	Nadeshiko League Cup	2012
Winner	Nadeshiko League Cup	2016
Winner	Nadeshiko League Cup	2018
Winner	Empress's Cup	2004
Winner	Empress's Cup	2005
Winner	Empress's Cup	2007
Winner	Empress's Cup	2008
Winner	Empress's Cup	2009
Winner	Empress's Cup	2014
Winner	Empress's Cup	2017
Winner	Empress's Cup	2018
Runner-up	Empress's Cup	2003
Representing Japan
Olympic Games
Silver medal – second place	2012 London	Team
FIFA Women's World Cup
Gold medal – first place	2011 Germany
Silver medal – second place	2015 Canada
AFC Women's Asian Cup
Gold medal – first place	2014 Vietnam
Bronze medal – third place	2008 Vietnam
Bronze medal – third place	2010 China
Asian Games
Gold medal – first place	2010 Guangzhou	Team
Silver medal – second place	2006 Doha	Team
Silver medal – second place	2014 Incheon	Team
- * Club domestic league appearances and goals as of 31 December 2018

Azusa Iwashimizu (岩清水 梓, Iwashimizu Azusa; born 14 October 1986) is a Japanese former footballer who played as a defender. She spent her entire career for Tokyo Verdy Beleza in the WE League and played for the Japan national team.

== Club career ==
Iwashimizu was born in Takizawa on 14 October 1986. In 2003, she was promoted to Nippon TV Beleza after developing in their youth team. She played 260 matches in the L.League until 2017. She was elected to the league's Best XI for 12 years in a row (2006-2017).

== National team career ==
On 18 February 2006, when Iwashimizu was 19 years old, she debuted for Japan national team against Russia. She has played in the 2007, 2011 and 2015 World Cups, winning the 2011 World Cup and winning a silver medal at the 2012 Summer Olympics. In the final minute of extra time in the 2011 World Cup Final, she was sent off after receiving a red card for slide tackling Alex Morgan. Japan would go on to win the match in the penalty shootout that followed.

Iwashimizu was instrumental in Japan's victory at the 2014 Asian Cup, scoring the winning goal in both the semifinal against China and the final against Australia. She played 122 games and scored 11 goals for Japan until 2016.

== Club statistics ==
As of 11 November 2012

Club	Season	League		Cup		League Cup		Total	
Club	Season	Apps	Goals	Apps	Goals	Apps	Goals	Apps	Goals
Nippon TV Beleza	2003	17	1	1	0	-		18	1
Nippon TV Beleza	2004	0	0			-			
Nippon TV Beleza	2005	16	1	4	0	-		20	1
Nippon TV Beleza	2006	17	3	3	0	-		20	3
Nippon TV Beleza	2007	19	1	3	0	1	0	23	1
Nippon TV Beleza	2008	16	2	0	0	-		16	2
Nippon TV Beleza	2009	21	2	4	0	-		25	2
Nippon TV Beleza	2010	17	2	1	0	5	0	23	2
Nippon TV Beleza	2011	16	1	3	0	-		19	1
Nippon TV Beleza	2012	17	1			5	0		
Career total		156	14			11	0		

== National team statistics ==
Japan national team
Year	Apps	Goals
2006	10	3
2007	13	2
2008	18	0
2009	3	0
2010	13	3
2011	17	0
2012	11	0
2013	10	0
2014	14	3
2015	10	0
2016	3	0
Total	122	11

International goals
#	Date	Venue	Opponent	Score	Result	Competition
1.	7 May 2006	Kumamoto Athletics Stadium, Kumamoto Japan	United States	1–0	1–3	Friendly Match
2.	7 December 2006	Umm-Affai Stadium, Al-Rayyan Qatar	China	0–1	0–1	Football at the 2006 Asian Games
3.	10 December 2006	Qatar SC Stadium, Doha Qatar	South Korea	1–0	3–1	Football at the 2006 Asian Games
4.	4 August 2007	Lạch Tray Stadium, Hai Phong, Vietnam	Vietnam	0–2	0–8	Football at the 2008 Summer Olympics qualification
5.	2 September 2007	Fukuda Denshi Arena, Chiba, Japan	Brazil	1–1	2–1	Friendly Match
6.	15 January 2010	Estadio Municipal Francisco Sánchez Rumoroso, Coquimbo Chile	Chile	1–1	1–1	2010 Bicennteniall Woman's Cup (es)
7.	20 May 2010	Chengdu Sports Centre, Chengdu China	Myanmar	1–0	8–0	2010 AFC Women's Asian Cup
8.	22 November 2010	Tianhe Stadium, Guangzhou China	North Korea	0–1	0–1	Football at the 2010 Asian Games
9.	22 May 2014	Thống Nhất Stadium, Ho Chi Minh City Vietnam	China	2-1	2–1	2014 AFC Women's Asian Cup
10.	25 May 2014	Thống Nhất Stadium, Ho Chi Minh City Vietnam	Australia	1-0	1-0	2014 AFC Women's Asian Cup
11.	26 September 2014	Hwaseong Stadium, South Korea	Hong Kong	5-0	9-0	Football at the 2014 Asian Games

== Honors and awards ==
=== Team ===
Japan women's national football team

- FIFA Women's World Cup

Champion: 2011

- East Asian Football Championship

Champion: 2010

- East Asian Football Championship

Champions: 2008, 2010

- AFC Women's Asian Cup

Champion: 2014
Nippon TV Beleza

- L.League

Champions (11): 2001, 2002, 2005, 2006, 2007, 2008, 2010, 2015, 2016, 2017, 2018

- Empress's Cup :

Champions: 2004, 2005, 2007, 2008, 2009, 2014, 2017, 2018

- Nadeshiko League Cup :

Champions: 2007, 2010, 2012, 2016, 2018

=== Individual ===
- L.League

Best Eleven (13): 2006, 2007, 2008, 2009, 2010, 2011, 2012, 2013, 2014, 2015, 2016, 2017, 2018
