= Japan and South Korea Women's League Championship =

Women's association football competition

Japan and South Korea Women's League Championship (Japanese: 日韓女子リーグチャンピオンシップ, Korean: 한일여자리그 챔피언십) was a women's association football competition between the clubs of Nadeshiko League (Japan Women's Football League division 1) winners and WK-League (Korea Republic Women's Football League) winners.

== History ==
The first edition was held in March 2010, where the two league winners of 2009 season competed. This competition aims at being developed into women's version of AFC Champions League, that is, many other Asian countries taking part.

== Results ==
=== 2010 ===
The first edition was held at the home ground of the 2009 Japanese champion Urawa Red Diamonds Ladies. Urawa Reds reversed the one-goal behind Daekyo Kangaroos in the last five minutes and won the title.

27 March 2010
13:00 UTC+9

Urawa Red Diamonds Ladies (Japan)	4–2	(South Korea) Daekyo Kangaroos
Arakawa 29'; Niwata 85'; Goto 86', 89'	report	Pretinha 9', 20'

(Japan) Urawa Komaba Stadium, Saitama
Attendance: 1,823

=== 2011 ===
The second edition was moved to South Korea.

13 March 2011
13:00 UTC+9

Suwon FMC (South Korea)	0–2	(Japan) Nippon TV Beleza
	report (Japanese)	Kiryu 73'; Ariyoshi 83'

(South Korea) Ulsan Stadium, Ulsan
Attendance: 400

=== 2012 ===
The third edition was held at the home ground of Japanese champion INAC Kobe Leonessa.

15 March 2012
19:00 UTC+9

INAC Kobe Leonessa (Japan)	3–0	(South Korea) Goyang Daekyo Noonnoppi
Ohno 8'; Kyokawa 51', 87'	report (Japanese)

(Japan) Home's Stadium Kobe, Kobe
Attendance: 2,219
