= Konomi Taniguchi =

Japanese association football player

Personal information
- Date of birth: 23 August 1996 (age 30)
- Place of birth: Kyoto Prefecture, Japan
- Height: 1.65 m (5 ft 5 in)
- Position: Forward

Team information
- Current team: Sanfrecce Hiroshima
- Number: 13

Senior career*
Years	Team	Apps	(Gls)
	Sanfrecce Hiroshima Regina	3	(1)
- * Club domestic league appearances and goals as of 23 November 2022 (UTC)

Konomi Taniguchi (born 23 August 1996) is a Japanese professional footballer who plays as a forward for WE League club Sanfrecce Hiroshima Regina.

== Club career ==
Taniguchi made her WE League debut on 12 September 2021.
