= Sakura Nojima =

Japanese footballer

Personal information
- Date of birth: 25 April 1999 (age 27)
- Place of birth: Kadoma, Japan
- Height: 1.59 m (5 ft 3 in)
- Position: Forward

Team information
- Current team: Nojima Stella Kanagawa Sagamihara
- Number: 13

Senior career*
Years	Team	Apps	(Gls)
- Nojima Stella Kanagawa Sagamihara
- * Club domestic league appearances and goals

Sakura Nojima (野島さくら; born 25 April 1999) is a Japanese professional footballer who plays as a forward for WE League club Nojima Stella Kanagawa Sagamihara.

== Club career ==
Nojima made her WE League debut on 12 September 2021.
