= Tsukuba FC Ladies =

Tsukuba F.C. Ladies つくばFCレディス
- Full name: Tsukuba F.C. Ladies
- Nickname: Tsukuba Ladies
- Founded: 1993
- Ground: Tsukuba Wellness Park Area B
- Chairman: Shinnosuke Ishikawa
- Manager: Takeshi Hashino
- League: Nadeshiko League Div.2
- 2022: Nadeshiko League Div.2, 8th
- Website: http://www.tsukuba-fc.com/woman/

Tsukuba F.C. Ladies (つくばFCレディス) is a women's football club playing in Japan's football league, Nadeshiko League Division 2. Its hometown is the city of Tsukuba.

== Squad ==
=== Current squad ===
As of 20 November 2022

Note: Flags indicate national team as defined under FIFA eligibility rules; some limited exceptions apply. Players may hold more than one non-FIFA nationality.

No.	Pos.	Nation	Player
1	GK	JPN	Syoko Kunika
2	DF	JPN	Kiyomi Hirano
3	DF	JPN	Risa Aoki
4	DF	JPN	Shiho Fujii
5	DF	JPN	Asuka Sugawara
6	DF	JPN	Mutsumi Mitsuma
7	FW	JPN	Yuri Imanaka
8	MF	JPN	Chizuru Ina
9	FW	JPN	Emi Shibata
10	MF	JPN	Yumi Kamei
12	FW	JPN	Kana Inoue
13	MF	JPN	Sari Oyama
14	MF	JPN	Fuyuki Nakamura
15	FW	JPN	Kanaho Shibata

No.	Pos.	Nation	Player
16	MF	JPN	Shiori Kawasaki
17	DF	JPN	Nagisa Saida
18	MF	JPN	Yuki Ito
19	MF	JPN	Misa Hanabusa
20	GK	JPN	Rumika Murakami
21	MF	JPN	Sayaka Kikuchi
22	FW	JPN	Hitomi Kojima
23	MF	JPN	Haruka Mochida
24	MF	JPN	Yukina Otobe
25	MF	JPN	Chizuru Morioka
27	DF	JPN	Riko Koike
28	DF	JPN	Eri Kamiyama
29	FW	JPN	Ruri Nagashima
30	GK	JPN	Yoshimi Nakagawa

== Results ==
Season	Domestic League				Empress's Cup	League Cup
Season	League	Level	Place	Tms.	Empress's Cup	League Cup
2006	Ibaraki; Div.1	5	3rd	5	DNQ	–
2007	Ibaraki; Div.1	5	4th	6	DNQ	–
2008	Ibaraki; Div.1	5	4th	6	DNQ	–
2009	Ibaraki; Div.1	5	2nd	6	DNQ	–
2010	Ibaraki; Div.1	5	2nd	6	DNQ	–
2011	Ibaraki; Div.1	5	1st	6	DNQ	–
2012	Ibaraki; Div.1	5	1st	6	DNQ	–
2013	Ibaraki; Div.1	5	1st	6	DNQ	–
2014	Kanto Div.2	4	6th	8	DNQ	–
2015	Challenge (East)	3	6th	6	DNQ	–
2016	Challenge	3	11th	12	DNQ	–
2017	Challenge	3	12th	12	First stage	–
2018	Challenge	3		12	DNQ	—
2019	Challenge	3		12	DNQ	–
2020	Challenge	3		12	DNQ	–
2021	Nadeshiko Div.2	3	6th	8	DNQ	–
2022	Nadeshiko Div.2	3	8th	10	DNQ	—
2023						
