= INAC Kobe Leonessa =

INAC Kobe Leonessa INAC神戸レオネッサ
- Full name: International Athletic Club Kobe Leonessa
- Founded: 2001; 25 years ago
- Ground: Noevir Stadium Kobe
- Capacity: 30,132
- Manager: Jordi Ferrón
- League: WE League
- 2025–26: 1st
- Website: https://inac-kobe.com/
Home colours	Away colours

INAC Kobe Leonessa (INAC神戸レオネッサ, Ainakku-Kōbe Reonessa) is a professional Japanese women's football club from Kobe, founded in 2001. INAC stands for International Athletic Club, while Leonessa means Lioness in Italian.

In 2006 INAC Leonessa was promoted to the Nadeshiko.League, where it has played since 2020. In 2021 they are playing in WE League. The 2008 season marked a great leap for the team as it was the runner-up both in the Nadeshiko.League and the All Japan Women's Football Championship. 2010 saw INAC lift its first title as they beat Urawa Red Diamonds in the final of the All Japan Women's Football Championship through a penalty shootout, and in 2011, coinciding with the club's 10th anniversary, the team won the double Nadeshiko.League – All Japan Women's Football Championship.

Leonessa's 2011 squad included seven champions of the 2011 World Cup: Ayumi Kaihori, Yukari Kinga, Nahomi Kawasumi, Shinobu Ohno, Homare Sawa, Megumi Takase and Asuna Tanaka.

== Kits ==
=== Kit suppliers and shirt sponsors ===
Period	Kit manufacturer	Shirt sponsor (chest)	Shirt sponsor (sleeve)
2021–2022	Hummel International	Earth	
2022–2023	Hummel International	Earth	Art Moving

== Mascot ==
=== Raimu-chan ===
- Born September 3.
- Modeled after the lioness from which the team got its name.
- Her favorite foods are Yakiniku and Japanese-style rolled omelette.

== Players ==
=== Current squad ===
As of 9 December 2024.

Note: Flags indicate national team as defined under FIFA eligibility rules; some limited exceptions apply. Players may hold more than one non-FIFA nationality.

No.	Pos.	Nation	Player
1	GK	JPN	Akane Okuma
21	GK	JPN	Yuan Kikuchi
99	GK	JPN	Mayu Funada
2	DF	JPN	Miyabi Moriya
3	DF	JPN	Mayo Doko
4	DF	JPN	Hinata Ide
5	DF	JPN	Shiori Miyake
6	DF	JPN	Yuna Matsubara
21	DF	ESP	Carla Morera
30	DF	JPN	Aoi Matsuki
37	DF	JPN	Natsume Kingetsu
53	DF	JPN	Rei Kitamura
55	DF	JAM	Vyan Sampson
7	MF	JPN	Maya Yamamoto
8	MF	KOR	Lee Su-bin
10	MF	JPN	Yui Narumiya
14	MF	JPN	Fukina Mizuno
18	MF	ESP	Paola Soldevila
23	MF	JPN	Wakana Mitani
39	MF	JPN	Koharu Terada
62	MF	JPN	Arisu Ota
9	FW	ESP	Carlota Suárez
11	FW	JPN	Megumi Takase
17	FW	JPN	Haruna Aikawa
19	FW	JPN	Mao Kubota
20	FW	JPN	Ai Kuwahara
29	FW	JPN	Ai Tsujisawa
44	FW	JPN	So Kojima

== Club staff ==
Position	Name
Manager	(Spain) Jordi Ferrón
Assistant Manager	(Japan) Eri Higashi (Japan) Ryota Shimizu
Goalkeeper Coach	(Japan) Riki Takashi
Fitness Coach	(Japan) Masao Tateishi
Team Doctor	(Japan) Ryosuke Kuroda (Japan) Takehiko Matsushita (Japan) Yoshiyuki Okada (Japan) Koji Sofuyu (Japan) Hide Watanabe (Japan) Wado Kitayama (Japan) Shosuke Nagata (Japan) Rika Shigemoto

== Honours ==
=== Domestic ===
- WE League
  - Champions (2): 2021–22, 2025–26
  - Runners-up (3): 2022–23, 2023–24, 2024–25
- Nadeshiko.League Division 1
  - Champions (3): 2011, 2012, 2013
  - Runners-up (5): 2008, 2016, 2017, 2018, 2020
- Empress's Cup
  - Champions (6): 2010, 2011, 2012, 2013, 2015, 2016, 2023
  - Runners-up (4): 2008, 2018, 2022, 2025
- WE League Cup
  - Runners-up (1): 2024–25
- Nadeshiko League Cup
  - Champions (1): 2013
  - Runners-up (3): 2012, 2018, 2019

=== International ===
- Japan/Korea Women's League Championship
  - Champions (1): 2012
- International Women's Club Championship
  - Champions (1): 2013
  - Runners-up (1): 2012

== Season-by-season records ==
Seasons of INAC Kobe Leonessa
Season	Domestic League				Empress's Cup	Nadeshiko League Cup / WE League Cup
Season	League	Level	Position	Tms.	Empress's Cup	Nadeshiko League Cup / WE League Cup
2002	Kansai League Division 3	4	Champions		DNQ	—
2003	Kansai League Division 2	3	Champions	8	DNQ	—
2004	Kansai League Division 1	3	Champions	8	Second round	—
2005	L2	2	Champions	7	Quarter-finals	—
2006	Nadeshiko League Division 1	1	5th	8	Quarter-finals	—
2007	Nadeshiko League Division 1	1	4th	8	Semi-finals	Semi-finals
2008	Nadeshiko League Division 1	1	2nd	8	Runners-up	—
2009	Nadeshiko League Division 1	1	4th	8	Semi-finals	—
2010	Nadeshiko	1	4th	10	Winners	Semi-finals
2011	Nadeshiko	1	Champions	9	Winners	—
2012	Nadeshiko	1	Champions	10	Winners	Runners-up
2013	Nadeshiko	1	Champions	10	Winners	Winners
2014	Nadeshiko	1	6th	10	Quarter-finals	—
2015	Nadeshiko League Division 1	1	3rd	10	Winners	—
2016	Nadeshiko League Division 1	1	2nd	10	Winners	Group stage
2017	Nadeshiko League Division 1	1	2nd	10	Third round	Semi-finals
2018	Nadeshiko League Division 1	1	2nd	10	Runners-up	Runners-up
2019	Nadeshiko League Division 1	1	3rd	10	Semi-finals	Runners-up
2020	Nadeshiko League Division 1	1	2nd	10	Quarter-finals	—
2021	Nadeshiko League Division 1	1	–	–	Fourth round	—
2021–22	WE League	1	Champions	11		Not held
2022–23	WE League	1	2nd	11	Runners-up	Group stage

== Continental record ==
Season	Competition	Round	Opponent	Score	Result
2026–27	AFC Women's Champions League	Group A	(Iran) Bam Khatoon	4–1	2nd out of 4
2026–27	AFC Women's Champions League	Group A	(Myanmar) Ayeyawady	2–0	2nd out of 4
2026–27	AFC Women's Champions League	Group A	(North Korea) Naegohyang	0–1	2nd out of 4
2026–27	AFC Women's Champions League	Quarter-finals			

== Transition of team name ==
- INAC Leonessa: 2001–2008
- INAC Kobe Leonessa: 2009–present

== See also ==
- Japan Football Association (JFA)
- List of women's football clubs in Japan
