= 1999 FIFA Women's World Cup squads =

Football squads

Below are the rosters for the 1999 FIFA Women's World Cup tournament in the United States. The 16 national teams involved in the tournament were required to register a squad of 20 players, including at least two goalkeepers. Only players in these squads were eligible to take part in the tournament.

== Group A ==
=== Denmark ===
Head coach: Jørgen Hvidemose

No.	Pos.	Player	Date of birth (age)	Caps	Goals	Club
1	GK	Dorthe Larsen	8 August 1969 (aged 29)			(Danish Football Association) Fortuna Hjørring
2	FW	Hanne Sand Christensen	22 September 1973 (aged 25)			(Danish Football Association) Fortuna Hjørring
3	FW	Karina Christensen	1 July 1973 (aged 25)			(Danish Football Association) BK Rødovre
4	FW	Lene Terp (captain)	15 April 1973 (aged 26)			(Danish Football Association) OB
5	FW	Marlene Kristensen	28 May 1973 (aged 26)			(Danish Football Association) OB
6	MF	Jeanne Axelsen	3 January 1968 (aged 31)			(Danish Football Association) Frederiksberg Boldklub
7	MF	Louise Hansen	4 May 1975 (aged 24)			(German Football Association) SF Siegen
8	MF	Janne Rasmussen	18 July 1970 (aged 28)			(Danish Football Association) OB
9	FW	Christina Petersen	17 September 1974 (aged 24)			(Danish Football Association) Fortuna Hjørring
10	FW	Gitte Krogh	13 May 1977 (aged 22)			(Danish Football Association) OB
11	FW	Merete Pedersen	30 June 1973 (aged 25)			(Danish Football Association) OB
12	FW	Lene Jensen	17 March 1976 (aged 23)			(Danish Football Association) HEI Aarhus
13	DF	Ulla Knudsen	21 June 1976 (aged 22)			(Danish Football Association) HEI Aarhus
14	DF	Katrine Pedersen	13 April 1977 (aged 22)			(Danish Football Association) HEI Aarhus
15	FW	Mikka Hansen	11 November 1975 (aged 23)			(Danish Football Association) Frederiksberg Boldklub
16	GK	Christina Jensen	21 January 1974 (aged 25)			(Danish Football Association) BK Rødovre
17	MF	Hanne Nørregaard	21 December 1968 (aged 30)			(Danish Football Association) Frederiksberg Boldklub
18	DF	Lise Søndergaard	27 October 1973 (aged 25)			(Danish Football Association) HEI Aarhus
19	FW	Janni Johansen	14 January 1976 (aged 23)			(Danish Football Association) Frederiksberg Boldklub
20	DF	Anne-Mette Christensen	4 March 1973 (aged 26)			(Danish Football Association) Fortuna Hjørring

=== Nigeria ===
Head coach: Mabo Ismaila

No.	Pos.	Player	Date of birth (age)	Caps	Goals	Club
1	GK	Ann Chiejine	2 February 1974 (aged 25)			(Nigeria Football Federation) Pelican Stars
2	DF	Yinka Kudaisi	25 August 1975 (aged 23)			(Nigeria Football Federation) Pelican Stars
3	MF	Martha Tarhemba	1 April 1978 (aged 21)			(Nigeria Football Federation) Pelican Stars
4	DF	Adanna Nwaneri	31 August 1975 (aged 23)			(Nigeria Football Federation) Capital Queens
5	DF	Eberechi Opara	6 March 1976 (aged 23)			(Nigeria Football Federation) Pelican Stars
6	DF	Florence Ajayi	28 April 1977 (aged 22)			(Nigeria Football Federation) Pelican Stars
7	FW	Stella Mbachu	16 April 1978 (aged 21)			(Nigeria Football Federation) Pelican Stars
8	FW	Rita Nwadike	3 November 1974 (aged 24)			(Nigeria Football Federation) Rivers Angels
9	MF	Gloria Usieta	19 June 1977 (aged 22)			(Nigeria Football Federation) Oladimeji Tigress
10	DF	Mavis Ogun	24 August 1973 (aged 25)			(Nigeria Football Federation) Ufuoma Babes
11	DF	Prisca Emeafu	30 March 1972 (aged 27)			(Nigeria Football Federation) Pelican Stars
12	GK	Judith Chime	20 May 1978 (aged 21)			(Nigeria Football Federation) Pelican Stars
13	MF	Nkiru Okosieme	1 March 1972 (aged 27)			(Nigeria Football Federation) Rivers Angels
14	MF	Florence Omagbemi (captain)	2 February 1975 (aged 24)			(Nigeria Football Federation) Pelican Stars
15	MF	Maureen Mmadu	7 May 1975 (aged 24)			(Nigeria Football Federation) Pelican Stars
16	DF	Florence Iweta	29 March 1983 (aged 16)			(Nigeria Football Federation) Capital Queens
17	FW	Nkechi Egbe	5 February 1978 (aged 21)			(Nigeria Football Federation) Capital Queens
18	FW	Patience Avre	10 June 1976 (aged 23)			(Nigeria Football Federation) Pelican Stars
19	FW	Mercy Akide	26 August 1975 (aged 23)			(Nigeria Football Federation) Pelican Stars
20	MF	Ifeanyi Chiejine	17 May 1983 (aged 16)			(Nigeria Football Federation) Capital Queens

=== North Korea ===
Head coach: Myong Dong-chan

No.	Pos.	Player	Date of birth (age)	Caps	Goals	Club
1	GK	Ri Jong-hui	20 August 1975 (aged 23)			(DPR Korea Football Association) Pyongyang
2	DF	Yun In-sil	10 January 1976 (aged 23)			(DPR Korea Football Association) Amnokgang
3	FW	Jo Song-ok	18 March 1974 (aged 25)			(DPR Korea Football Association) Pyongyang
4	DF	Kim Sun-hui	4 April 1972 (aged 27)			(DPR Korea Football Association) Wolmido
5	DF	Kim Sun-hye	1 January 1977 (aged 22)			(DPR Korea Football Association) Rimyongsu
6	MF	Sol Yong-suk	4 February 1975 (aged 24)			(DPR Korea Football Association) Kyonggongopsong
7	MF	Ri Hyang-ok	18 December 1977 (aged 21)			(DPR Korea Football Association) Rimyongsu
8	FW	Kim Song-ryo	5 June 1976 (aged 23)			(DPR Korea Football Association) Amnokgang
9	MF	Ri Kyong-ae	4 December 1972 (aged 26)			(DPR Korea Football Association) Sobaeksu
10	MF	Kim Kum-sil (captain)	24 December 1970 (aged 28)			(DPR Korea Football Association) Pyongyang
11	FW	Jo Jong-ran	18 September 1971 (aged 27)			(DPR Korea Football Association) Rimyongsu
12	DF	Kim Hye-ran	19 May 1970 (aged 29)			(DPR Korea Football Association) Wolmido
13	DF	Ri Ae-gyong	12 September 1971 (aged 27)			(DPR Korea Football Association) Wolmido
14	MF	Pak Jong-ae	3 April 1974 (aged 25)			(DPR Korea Football Association) Rimyongsu
15	FW	Jin Pyol-hui	19 August 1980 (aged 18)			(DPR Korea Football Association) Wolmido
16	MF	Ri Kum-suk	16 August 1978 (aged 20)			(DPR Korea Football Association) Sobaeksu
17	DF	Yang Kyong-hui	21 January 1978 (aged 21)			(DPR Korea Football Association) Wolmido
18	GK	Kye Yong-sun	27 March 1972 (aged 27)			(DPR Korea Football Association) Wolmido
19	DF	Jang Ok-gyong	29 January 1980 (aged 19)			(DPR Korea Football Association) Amnokgang
20	MF	Kim Un-ok	18 April 1978 (aged 21)			(DPR Korea Football Association) Kigwancha

=== United States ===
Head coach: Tony DiCicco

No.	Pos.	Player	Date of birth (age)	Caps	Goals	Club
1	GK	Briana Scurry	7 September 1971 (aged 27)		0	(United States Soccer Federation) U.S. Soccer
2	MF	Lorrie Fair	5 August 1978 (aged 20)		1	(United States Soccer Federation) U.S. Soccer
3	DF	Christie Pearce	24 June 1975 (aged 23)		3	(United States Soccer Federation) U.S. Soccer
4	DF	Carla Overbeck (captain)	9 May 1968 (aged 31)		7	(United States Soccer Federation) U.S. Soccer
5	MF	Tiffany Roberts	5 May 1977 (aged 22)		6	(United States Soccer Federation) U.S. Soccer
6	DF	Brandi Chastain	21 July 1968 (aged 30)		20	(United States Soccer Federation) U.S. Soccer
7	MF	Sara Whalen	28 April 1976 (aged 23)		2	(United States Soccer Federation) U.S. Soccer
8	MF	Shannon MacMillan	7 October 1974 (aged 24)		19	(United States Soccer Federation) U.S. Soccer
9	FW	Mia Hamm	17 March 1972 (aged 27)		111	(United States Soccer Federation) U.S. Soccer
10	MF	Michelle Akers	1 February 1966 (aged 33)		104	(United States Soccer Federation) U.S. Soccer
11	MF	Julie Foudy	23 January 1971 (aged 28)		29	(United States Soccer Federation) U.S. Soccer
12	FW	Cindy Parlow	8 May 1978 (aged 21)		25	(United States Soccer Federation) U.S. Soccer
13	MF	Kristine Lilly	22 July 1971 (aged 27)		71	(United States Soccer Federation) U.S. Soccer
14	DF	Joy Fawcett	8 February 1968 (aged 31)		18	(United States Soccer Federation) U.S. Soccer
15	MF	Tisha Venturini	3 March 1973 (aged 26)		41	(United States Soccer Federation) U.S. Soccer
16	FW	Tiffeny Milbrett	23 October 1972 (aged 26)		58	(United States Soccer Federation) U.S. Soccer
17	FW	Danielle Fotopoulos	24 March 1976 (aged 23)		8	(United States Soccer Federation) U.S. Soccer
18	GK	Saskia Webber	13 June 1971 (aged 28)		0	(United States Soccer Federation) U.S. Soccer
19	GK	Tracy Ducar	18 June 1973 (aged 26)		0	(United States Soccer Federation) U.S. Soccer
20	DF	Kate Sobrero	23 August 1976 (aged 22)		0	(United States Soccer Federation) U.S. Soccer

== Group B ==
=== Brazil ===
Head coach: Wilsinho

No.	Pos.	Player	Date of birth (age)	Caps	Goals	Club
1	GK	Maravilha	10 April 1973 (aged 26)			(Brazilian Football Confederation) São Paulo
2	DF	Nenê	31 March 1976 (aged 23)			(Brazilian Football Confederation) São Paulo
3	DF	Elane (captain)	4 June 1968 (aged 31)			(Brazilian Football Confederation) São Paulo
4	DF	Tânia	3 October 1974 (aged 24)			(Brazilian Football Confederation) Lusa Sant’Anna
5	MF	Cidinha	6 October 1976 (aged 22)			(Brazilian Football Confederation) Palmeiras
6	DF	Juliana	3 October 1981 (aged 17)			(Brazilian Football Confederation) São Paulo
7	FW	Maycon	30 April 1977 (aged 22)			(Brazilian Football Confederation) Lusa Sant’Anna
8	MF	Formiga	3 March 1978 (aged 21)			(Brazilian Football Confederation) Lusa Sant’Anna
9	FW	Kátia	18 February 1977 (aged 22)			(Brazilian Football Confederation) São Paulo
10	MF	Sissi	2 June 1967 (aged 32)			(Brazilian Football Confederation) Palmeiras
11	DF	Suzana	12 October 1973 (aged 25)			(Brazilian Football Confederation) São Paulo
12	GK	Andréia	14 September 1977 (aged 21)			(Brazilian Football Confederation) São Paulo
13	DF	Fanta	14 September 1966 (aged 32)			(Brazilian Football Confederation) Vasco da Gama
14	FW	Grazielle	28 March 1981 (aged 18)			(Brazilian Football Confederation) Lusa Sant’Anna
15	MF	Raquel	10 May 1978 (aged 21)			(Brazilian Football Confederation) São Paulo
16	DF	Marisa	10 August 1966 (aged 32)			(Brazilian Football Confederation) Lusa Sant’Anna
17	FW	Pretinha	19 May 1975 (aged 24)			
18	MF	Priscila	10 March 1982 (aged 17)			(Brazilian Football Confederation) Lusa Sant’Anna
19	MF	Valeria	9 March 1968 (aged 31)			(Brazilian Football Confederation) Lusa Sant’Anna
20	MF	Deva	16 April 1981 (aged 18)			(Brazilian Football Confederation) Lusa Sant’Anna

=== Germany ===
Head coach: Tina Theune-Meyer

No.	Pos.	Player	Date of birth (age)	Caps	Goals	Club
1	GK	Silke Rottenberg	25 January 1972 (aged 27)	5		(German Football Association) Sportfreunde Siegen
2	DF	Kerstin Stegemann	29 September 1977 (aged 21)	42		(German Football Association) FCR Duisburg
3	DF	Ariane Hingst	25 July 1979 (aged 19)	46		(German Football Association) 1. FFC Turbine Potsdam
4	DF	Steffi Jones	22 December 1972 (aged 26)	38		(German Football Association) SC 07 Bad Neuenahr
5	DF	Doris Fitschen (captain)	25 October 1968 (aged 30)	38		(German Football Association) 1. FFC Frankfurt
6	MF	Melanie Hoffmann	29 November 1974 (aged 24)	14		(German Football Association) FCR Duisburg
7	MF	Martina Voss	22 December 1967 (aged 31)	28		(German Football Association) FCR Duisburg
8	MF	Sandra Smisek	3 July 1977 (aged 21)	18		(German Football Association) FCR Duisburg
9	FW	Birgit Prinz	25 October 1977 (aged 21)	43		(German Football Association) 1. FFC Frankfurt
10	MF	Bettina Wiegmann	7 October 1971 (aged 27)	44		(German Football Association) Sportfreunde Siegen
11	MF	Maren Meinert	5 February 1973 (aged 26)	40		(German Football Association) FCR Duisburg
12	FW	Claudia Müller	21 May 1974 (aged 25)	45		(German Football Association) 1. FFC Frankfurt
13	DF	Sandra Minnert	7 April 1973 (aged 26)	42		(German Football Association) FSV Frankfurt
14	DF	Tina Wunderlich	10 October 1977 (aged 21)	40		(German Football Association) 1. FFC Frankfurt
15	GK	Nadine Angerer	10 November 1978 (aged 20)	25		(German Football Association) FC Wacker München
16	MF	Renate Lingor	11 October 1975 (aged 23)	14		(German Football Association) 1. FFC Frankfurt
17	DF	Pia Wunderlich	26 January 1975 (aged 24)	28		(German Football Association) 1. FFC Frankfurt
18	FW	Inka Grings	31 October 1978 (aged 20)	17		(German Football Association) FCR Duisburg
19	DF	Nicole Brandebusemeyer	9 October 1974 (aged 24)	46		(German Football Association) Grün-Weiß Brauweiler
20	FW	Monika Meyer	23 June 1972 (aged 26)	17		(German Football Association) 1. FFC Frankfurt

=== Italy ===
Head coach: Carlo Facchin

No.	Pos.	Player	Date of birth (age)	Caps	Goals	Club
1	GK	Giorgia Brenzan	21 August 1967 (aged 31)			(Italian Football Federation) AC Milan
2	DF	Damiana Deiana	26 June 1970 (aged 28)			(Italian Football Federation) Torres
3	DF	Paola Zanni	12 June 1977 (aged 22)			(Italian Football Federation) AC Milan
4	DF	Luisa Marchio	6 February 1971 (aged 28)			(Italian Football Federation) Torino
5	DF	Daniela Tavalazzi	8 August 1972 (aged 26)			(Italian Football Federation) Torres
6	DF	Elisa Miniati	6 January 1974 (aged 25)			(Italian Football Federation) Autolelli Picenum
7	FW	Rita Guarino	31 January 1971 (aged 28)			(Italian Football Federation) Torres
8	MF	Manuela Tesse	28 February 1976 (aged 23)			(Italian Football Federation) Lazio
9	FW	Patrizia Panico	8 February 1975 (aged 24)			(Italian Football Federation) Lazio
10	MF	Antonella Carta (captain)	1 March 1967 (aged 32)			(Italian Football Federation) Autolelli Picenum
11	FW	Patrizia Sberti	6 July 1969 (aged 29)			(Italian Football Federation) Agliana
12	GK	Fabiana Comin	20 March 1970 (aged 29)			(Italian Football Federation) Bardolino
13	DF	Anna Duò	8 August 1972 (aged 26)			(Italian Football Federation) Bardolino
14	MF	Federica D'Astolfo	27 October 1966 (aged 32)			(Italian Football Federation) Pisa
15	DF	Adele Frollani	4 August 1974 (aged 24)			(Italian Football Federation) Lazio
16	MF	Tatiana Zorri	19 October 1977 (aged 21)			(Italian Football Federation) Lazio
17	FW	Silvia Tagliacarne	8 August 1975 (aged 23)			(Italian Football Federation) AC Milan
18	MF	Silvia Fiorini	24 December 1969 (aged 29)			(Italian Football Federation) Agliana
19	MF	Alessandra Pallotti	7 September 1974 (aged 24)			(Italian Football Federation) Agliana
20	DF	Roberta Stefanelli	18 May 1974 (aged 25)			(Italian Football Federation) Bardolino

=== Mexico ===
Head coach: Leonardo Cuéllar

No.	Pos.	Player	Date of birth (age)	Caps	Goals	Club
1	GK	Linnea Quiñones	17 July 1980 (aged 18)			(United States Soccer Federation) San Diego State Aztecs
2	DF	Susana Mora	26 January 1979 (aged 20)			(United States Soccer Federation) USC Trojans
3	DF	Martha Moore	14 April 1981 (aged 18)			(United States Soccer Federation) Texas A&M Aggies
4	DF	Gina Oceguera (captain)	9 April 1977 (aged 22)			(United States Soccer Federation) Cal Poly Mustangs
5	MF	Patricia Pérez	17 December 1978 (aged 20)			(Mexican Football Federation) Guadalajara
6	MF	Fátima Leyva	14 February 1980 (aged 19)			(Mexican Football Federation) Laguna de Iztacalco
7	MF	Mónica Vergara	2 May 1983 (aged 16)			
8	MF	Andrea Rodebaugh	8 October 1966 (aged 32)			
9	FW	Lisa Náñez	10 March 1977 (aged 22)			(United States Soccer Federation) Santa Clara Broncos
10	FW	Maribel Domínguez	18 November 1978 (aged 20)			(Mexican Football Federation) Santos Laguna
11	FW	Mónica Gerardo	10 November 1976 (aged 22)			(United States Soccer Federation) Notre Dame Fighting Irish
12	GK	Yvette Valdez	16 October 1973 (aged 25)			(United States Soccer Federation) California Storm
13	FW	Mónica González	10 October 1978 (aged 20)			(United States Soccer Federation) Notre Dame Fighting Irish
14	FW	Iris Mora	22 September 1981 (aged 17)			(Mexican Football Federation) Bugatti
15	MF	Laurie Hill	11 February 1970 (aged 29)			(United States Soccer Federation) UC Santa Barbara
16	FW	Nancy Pinzón	6 June 1974 (aged 25)			(United States Soccer Federation) Cal State San Bernardino
17	MF	Kendyl Michner	3 May 1978 (aged 21)			(United States Soccer Federation) Tennessee Volunteers
18	FW	Tánima Rubalcaba	24 December 1980 (aged 18)			
19	DF	Bárbara Almaraz	4 May 1979 (aged 20)			(United States Soccer Federation) USC Trojans
20	MF	Denise Ireta	4 January 1980 (aged 19)			

== Group C ==
=== Canada ===
Head coach: (England) Neil Turnbull

No.	Pos.	Player	Date of birth (age)	Caps	Goals	Club
1	GK	Nicci Wright	12 August 1972 (aged 26)	19	0	(Canadian Soccer Association) Gorge FC
2	MF	Liz Smith	25 September 1975 (aged 23)	19	2	(German Football Association) Heike Rheine
3	DF	Sharolta Nonen	30 December 1977 (aged 21)	4	0	(United States Soccer Federation) Nebraska Cornhuskers
4	MF	Tanya Franck	13 December 1974 (aged 24)	18	2	(Canadian Soccer Association) Toronto Inferno
5	DF	Andrea Neil	26 October 1971 (aged 27)	27	3	(Canadian Soccer Association) UBC Alumni
6	MF	Geri Donnelly	30 November 1965 (aged 33)	68	9	(Canadian Soccer Association) Metro-Ford
7	DF	Isabelle Morneau	18 April 1976 (aged 23)	23	4	(United States Soccer Federation) Nebraska Cornhuskers
8	FW	Sara Maglio	17 March 1978 (aged 21)	4	0	(Canadian Soccer Association) Simon Fraser Red Leafs
9	DF	Janine Helland	24 April 1970 (aged 29)	44	1	(Canadian Soccer Association) Edmonton Angels
10	FW	Charmaine Hooper	15 January 1968 (aged 31)	56	34	(United States Soccer Federation) Chicago Cobras
11	FW	Shannon Rosenow	20 June 1972 (aged 26)	21	1	(Canadian Soccer Association) Gorge FC
12	FW	Isabelle Harvey	27 March 1975 (aged 24)	14	2	(United States Soccer Federation) University of Southern California
13	MF	Amy Walsh	13 September 1977 (aged 21)	16	0	(United States Soccer Federation) Nebraska Cornhuskers
14	MF	Sarah Joly	16 February 1977 (aged 22)	17	1	(Canadian Soccer Association) Edmonton Angels
15	DF	Suzanne Muir	6 July 1970 (aged 28)	31	2	(Canadian Soccer Association) UBC Alumni
16	MF	Jeanette Haas	3 January 1976 (aged 23)	6	0	(Canadian Soccer Association) Victoria Vikes
17	FW	Silvana Burtini (captain)	10 May 1969 (aged 30)	41	29	(United States Soccer Federation) Raleigh Wings
18	MF	Mary Beth Bowie	27 October 1978 (aged 20)	5	0	(Canadian Soccer Association) Edmonton Angels
19	GK	Melanie Haz	26 November 1975 (aged 23)	0	0	(Canadian Soccer Association) Edmonton Ital-Canadians
20	GK	Karina LeBlanc	30 March 1980 (aged 19)	4	0	(United States Soccer Federation) Nebraska Cornhuskers

=== Japan ===
Head coach: Satoshi Miyauchi

No.	Pos.	Player	Date of birth (age)	Caps	Goals	Club
1	GK	Shiho Onodera	18 November 1973 (aged 25)			(Japan Football Association) NTV Beleza
2	DF	Rie Yamaki	2 October 1975 (aged 23)			(German Football Association) 1. FFC Frankfurt
3	DF	Kaoru Nagadome	7 May 1973 (aged 26)			(Japan Football Association) Prima Kunoichi
4	DF	Mai Nakachi	16 December 1980 (aged 18)			(Japan Football Association) NTV Beleza
5	MF	Tomoe Sakai	27 May 1978 (aged 21)			(Japan Football Association) NTV Beleza
6	DF	Kae Nishina	7 December 1972 (aged 26)			(Japan Football Association) Prima Kunoichi
7	DF	Yumi Tomei	1 June 1972 (aged 27)			(Japan Football Association) Prima Kunoichi
8	MF	Ayumi Hara	21 February 1979 (aged 20)			(Japan Football Association) NTV Beleza
9	FW	Tamaki Uchiyama	13 December 1972 (aged 26)			(Japan Football Association) Prima Kunoichi
10	MF	Homare Sawa (captain)	6 September 1978 (aged 20)			(Japan Football Association) NTV Beleza
11	FW	Nami Otake	30 July 1974 (aged 24)			(Japan Football Association) NTV Beleza
12	DF	Hiromi Isozaki	22 December 1975 (aged 23)			(Japan Football Association) Tasaki Perule
13	MF	Miyuki Yanagita	11 April 1981 (aged 18)			(Japan Football Association) NTV Beleza
14	MF	Tomomi Mitsui	31 December 1978 (aged 20)			(Japan Football Association) Prima Kunoichi
15	FW	Mito Isaka	25 January 1976 (aged 23)			(Japan Football Association) Prima Kunoichi
16	MF	Yayoi Kobayashi	18 September 1981 (aged 17)			(Japan Football Association) NTV Beleza
17	FW	Mayumi Omatsu	12 July 1970 (aged 28)			(Japan Football Association) OKI FC Winds
18	GK	Nozomi Yamago	16 January 1975 (aged 24)			(Japan Football Association) Prima Kunoichi
19	FW	Kozue Ando	9 July 1982 (aged 16)			(Japan Football Association) Utsunomiya WHS
20	GK	Naoko Nishigai	22 January 1969 (aged 30)			(Japan Football Association) OKI FC Winds

=== Norway ===
Head coach: Per-Mathias Høgmo

No.	Pos.	Player	Date of birth (age)	Caps	Goals	Club
1	GK	Bente Nordby	23 July 1974 (aged 24)			(Norwegian Football Federation) Athene Moss
2	DF	Brit Sandaune	5 June 1972 (aged 27)			(Norwegian Football Federation) Trondheims-Ørn
3	DF	Gøril Kringen	28 January 1972 (aged 27)			(Norwegian Football Federation) Trondheims-Ørn
4	MF	Silje Jørgensen	5 May 1977 (aged 22)			(Norwegian Football Federation) Klepp
5	DF	Henriette Viker	5 August 1973 (aged 25)			(Norwegian Football Federation) Asker
6	MF	Hege Riise	18 July 1969 (aged 29)			(Norwegian Football Federation) Setskog/Høland FK
7	MF	Tone Gunn Frustøl	21 June 1975 (aged 23)			(Norwegian Football Federation) Asker
8	MF	Monica Knudsen	25 March 1975 (aged 24)			(Norwegian Football Federation) Asker
9	MF	Ann Kristin Aarønes	19 January 1973 (aged 26)			(Norwegian Football Federation) Trondheims-Ørn
10	DF	Linda Medalen (captain)	17 June 1965 (aged 34)			(Norwegian Football Federation) Asker
11	MF	Marianne Pettersen	12 April 1975 (aged 24)			(Norwegian Football Federation) Asker
12	GK	Astrid Johannessen	10 January 1978 (aged 21)			(Norwegian Football Federation) Asker
13	MF	Ragnhild Gulbrandsen	22 February 1977 (aged 22)			(Norwegian Football Federation) Trondheims-Ørn
14	DF	Anne Nymark Andersen	28 September 1972 (aged 26)			(Norwegian Football Federation) Bjørnar
15	MF	Dagny Mellgren	19 June 1978 (aged 21)			(Norwegian Football Federation) Bjørnar
16	MF	Solveig Gulbrandsen	12 January 1981 (aged 18)			(Norwegian Football Federation) Kolbotn
17	MF	Anita Rapp	24 July 1977 (aged 21)			(Norwegian Football Federation) Asker
18	DF	Anne Tønnessen	18 March 1974 (aged 25)			(Norwegian Football Federation) Kolbotn
19	MF	Linda Ørmen	22 March 1977 (aged 22)			(Norwegian Football Federation) Athene Moss
20	MF	Unni Lehn	7 June 1977 (aged 22)			(Norwegian Football Federation) Trondheims-Ørn

=== Russia ===
Head coach: Yuri Bystritsky

No.	Pos.	Player	Date of birth (age)	Caps	Goals	Club
1	GK	Svetlana Petko	6 June 1970 (aged 29)			(Russian Football Union) Samara
2	DF	Yulia Yushekivitch	14 September 1980 (aged 18)			(Russian Football Union) Ryazan
3	DF	Marina Burakova	8 May 1966 (aged 33)			(Russian Football Union) Ryazan
4	DF	Natalia Karasseva	30 April 1977 (aged 22)			(Russian Football Union) Samara
5	DF	Tatiana Cheverda	29 August 1974 (aged 24)			(Russian Football Union) Dynamo Moscow
6	DF	Galina Komarova	12 August 1977 (aged 21)			(Russian Football Union) Samara
7	MF	Tatiana Egorova	10 March 1970 (aged 29)			(Russian Football Union) Samara
8	MF	Irina Grigorieva (captain)	21 February 1972 (aged 27)			(Russian Football Union) Samara
9	MF	Alexandra Svetlitskaya	20 August 1971 (aged 27)			(Russian Football Union) Samara
10	FW	Natalia Barbashina	26 August 1973 (aged 25)			(Russian Football Union) Ryazan
11	FW	Olga Letyushova	29 December 1975 (aged 23)			(Russian Football Union) Ryazan
12	GK	Alla Volkova	12 April 1968 (aged 31)			(Russian Football Union) Dynamo Moscow
13	MF	Elena Fomina	5 April 1979 (aged 20)			(Russian Football Union) Chertanovo Moscow
14	MF	Olga Karasseva	6 October 1975 (aged 23)			(Russian Football Union) Chertanovo Moscow
15	FW	Larisa Savina	25 November 1970 (aged 28)			(Russian Football Union) Samara
16	DF	Natalia Filippova	7 February 1975 (aged 24)			(Russian Football Union) Samara
17	MF	Elena Lissacheva	25 November 1973 (aged 25)			(Russian Football Union) Lada Togliatti
18	MF	Tatyana Skotnikova	27 November 1978 (aged 20)			(Russian Football Union) Lada Togliatti
19	DF	Tatiana Zaitseva	27 August 1978 (aged 20)			(Russian Football Union) Kubanochka Krasnodar
20	GK	Larissa Kapitonova	4 May 1970 (aged 29)			(Russian Football Union) Ryazan

== Group D ==
=== Australia ===
Head coach: Greg Brown

No.	Pos.	Player	Date of birth (age)	Caps	Goals	Club
1	GK	Belinda Kitching	15 July 1977 (aged 21)			(Football Australia) Canberra Eclipse
2	DF	Amy Taylor	11 June 1979 (aged 20)			(Football Australia) Canberra Eclipse
3	DF	Bridgette Starr	10 December 1975 (aged 23)			(Football Australia) NSW Sapphires
4	DF	Sarah Cooper	8 October 1969 (aged 29)			(Football Australia) Canberra Eclipse
5	DF	Traci Bartlett	17 May 1972 (aged 27)			(Football Australia) Canberra Eclipse
6	DF	Anissa Tann	10 October 1967 (aged 31)			(Football Australia) NSW Sapphires
7	MF	Lisa Casagrande	29 May 1978 (aged 21)			(Football Australia) Canberra Eclipse
8	FW	Cheryl Salisbury	8 March 1974 (aged 25)			(Football Australia) NNSW Horizon
9	FW	Julie Murray (captain)	28 April 1970 (aged 29)			(Football Australia) NSW Sapphires
10	MF	Angela Iannotta	22 March 1971 (aged 28)			(Football Australia) Canberra Eclipse
11	MF	Sharon Black	4 April 1971 (aged 28)			(Football Australia) SASI Pirates
12	DF	Kristyn Swaffer	13 December 1975 (aged 23)			(Football Australia) SASI Pirates
13	FW	Alicia Ferguson	31 October 1981 (aged 17)			(Football Australia) Queensland Sting
14	MF	Joanne Peters	11 March 1979 (aged 20)			(Football Australia) NSW Sapphires
15	MF	Peita-Claire Hepperlin	24 December 1981 (aged 17)			(Football Australia) Canberra Eclipse
16	MF	Amy Wilson	9 June 1980 (aged 19)			(Football Australia) Canberra Eclipse
17	MF	Kelly Golebiowski	26 July 1981 (aged 17)			(Football Australia) NSW Sapphires
18	MF	Alison Forman	17 March 1969 (aged 30)			(Football Australia) NNSW Horizon
19	DF	Dianne Alagich	12 May 1979 (aged 20)			(Football Australia) SASI Pirates
20	GK	Tracey Wheeler	26 September 1967 (aged 31)			(Football Australia) SASI Pirates

=== China PR ===
Head coach: Ma Yuanan

No.	Pos.	Player	Date of birth (age)	Caps	Goals	Club
1	GK	Han Wenxia	23 August 1976 (aged 22)			(Chinese Football Association) Dalian
2	MF	Wang Liping	12 November 1973 (aged 25)			(Chinese Football Association) Hebei
3	DF	Fan Yunjie	29 April 1972 (aged 27)			(Chinese Football Association) Henan
4	DF	Man Yanling	9 November 1972 (aged 26)			(Chinese Football Association) Beijing Chengjian
5	DF	Xie Huilin	17 January 1975 (aged 24)			(Chinese Football Association) Shanghai SVA
6	MF	Zhao Lihong	25 December 1972 (aged 26)			(Chinese Football Association) Guangdong
7	FW	Zhang Ouying	2 November 1975 (aged 23)			(Chinese Football Association) Hebei
8	FW	Jin Yan	27 July 1972 (aged 26)			(Chinese Football Association) Beijing Chengjian
9	FW	Sun Wen (captain)	6 April 1973 (aged 26)			(Chinese Football Association) Shanghai SVA
10	MF	Liu Ailing	2 May 1967 (aged 32)			(Chinese Football Association) Beijing Chengjian
11	MF	Pu Wei	20 August 1980 (aged 18)			(Chinese Football Association) Shanghai SVA
12	DF	Wen Lirong	2 October 1969 (aged 29)			(Chinese Football Association) Beijing Chengjian
13	MF	Liu Ying	11 June 1974 (aged 25)			(Chinese Football Association) Beijing Chengjian
14	DF	Bai Jie	28 March 1972 (aged 27)			(Chinese Football Association) Army
15	MF	Qiu Haiyan	17 June 1974 (aged 25)			(Chinese Football Association) Guangdong
16	FW	Fan Chunling	2 February 1972 (aged 27)			(Chinese Football Association) Beijing Chengjian
17	MF	Zhu Jing	2 March 1978 (aged 21)			(Chinese Football Association) Shandong
18	GK	Gao Hong	27 November 1967 (aged 31)			(Chinese Football Association) Guangdong
19	DF	Gao Hongxia	7 December 1973 (aged 25)			(Chinese Football Association) Shanghai SVA
20	DF	Wang Jingxia	11 November 1976 (aged 22)			(Chinese Football Association) Shanghai SVA

=== Ghana ===
Head coach: Emmanuel Kwasi Afranie

No.	Pos.	Player	Date of birth (age)	Caps	Goals	Club
1	GK	Memunatu Sulemana	4 November 1977 (aged 21)			(Ghana Football Association) Mawuena Ladies
2	DF	Patience Sackey	25 April 1975 (aged 24)			(Ghana Football Association) Postal Ladies
3	DF	Rita Yeboah	25 May 1976 (aged 23)			(Ghana Football Association) Bluna Ladies
4	DF	Regina Ansah	23 August 1974 (aged 24)			(Ghana Football Association) Bluna Ladies
5	DF	Elizabeth Baidu	28 April 1978 (aged 21)			(Ghana Football Association) Bluna Ladies
6	MF	Juliana Kakraba	29 December 1979 (aged 19)			(Ghana Football Association) Ghatel Ladies
7	FW	Mavis Dgajmah	21 December 1973 (aged 25)			(Ghana Football Association) La Ladies
8	DF	Barikisu Tettey-Quao	28 August 1980 (aged 18)			(Ghana Football Association) La Ladies
9	FW	Alberta Sackey (captain)	6 November 1972 (aged 26)			(Ghana Football Association) Ghatel Ladies
10	FW	Vivian Mensah	13 June 1972 (aged 27)			(Ghana Football Association) La Ladies
11	FW	Adjoa Bayor	17 May 1979 (aged 20)			(Ghana Football Association) Ghatel Ladies
12	DF	Kulu Yahaya	23 May 1976 (aged 23)			(Ghana Football Association) Ashiaman Ladies
13	DF	Lydia Ankrah	1 December 1973 (aged 25)			(Ghana Football Association) Postal Ladies
14	DF	Mercy Tagoe	5 February 1974 (aged 25)			(Ghana Football Association) Bluna Ladies
15	FW	Nana Gyamfuah	4 August 1978 (aged 20)			(Ghana Football Association) Postal Ladies
16	FW	Gladys Enti	21 April 1975 (aged 24)			(Ghana Football Association) Ghatel Ladies
17	FW	Sheila Okai	14 February 1979 (aged 20)			(Ghana Football Association) Ghatel Ladies
18	GK	Priscilla Mensah	19 April 1974 (aged 25)			(Ghana Football Association) La Ladies
19	MF	Stella Quartey	28 December 1973 (aged 25)			(Ghana Football Association) Ghatel Ladies
20	MF	Genevive Clottey	29 April 1969 (aged 30)			(Ghana Football Association) Ghatel Ladies

=== Sweden ===
Head coach: Marika Domanski-Lyfors

No.	Pos.	Player	Date of birth (age)	Caps	Goals	Club
1	GK	Ulrika Karlsson	14 October 1970 (aged 28)	34	0	(Swedish Football Association) Bälinge IF
2	DF	Karolina Westberg	16 May 1978 (aged 21)	27	0	(Swedish Football Association) Malmö FF
3	DF	Jane Törnqvist	9 May 1975 (aged 24)	37	5	(Swedish Football Association) Älvsjö
4	DF	Åsa Lönnqvist	14 April 1970 (aged 29)	61	1	(Swedish Football Association) Älvsjö
5	MF	Kristin Bengtsson	12 January 1970 (aged 29)	77	4	(Norwegian Football Federation) Athene Moss
6	MF	Malin Moström	1 August 1975 (aged 23)	9	2	(Swedish Football Association) Umeå IK
7	DF	Cecilia Sandell	10 June 1968 (aged 31)	41	2	(Swedish Football Association) Älvsjö
8	FW	Malin Gustafsson	24 January 1980 (aged 19)	6	1	(Swedish Football Association) Sunnanå SK
9	MF	Malin Andersson (captain)	4 May 1973 (aged 26)	69	20	(Swedish Football Association) Älvsjö
10	MF	Hanna Ljungberg	8 January 1979 (aged 20)	35	5	(Swedish Football Association) Umeå IK
11	FW	Victoria Svensson	18 May 1977 (aged 22)	32	8	(Swedish Football Association) Älvsjö
12	GK	Ulla-Karin Thelin	19 February 1977 (aged 22)	2	0	(Swedish Football Association) Umeå IK
13	DF	Hanna Marklund	26 November 1977 (aged 21)	13	0	(Swedish Football Association) Sunnanå SK
14	DF	Jessika Sundh	9 July 1974 (aged 24)	5	0	(Swedish Football Association) Djurgårdens IF
15	MF	Linda Gren	12 November 1974 (aged 24)	5	0	(Swedish Football Association) Djurgårdens IF
16	FW	Salina Olsson	29 August 1978 (aged 20)	18	1	(Swedish Football Association) Djurgårdens IF
17	MF	Linda Fagerström	17 March 1977 (aged 22)	18	2	(Swedish Football Association) Hammarby
18	MF	Therese Lundin	3 March 1979 (aged 20)	1	0	(Swedish Football Association) Malmö FF
19	MF	Minna Heponiemi	10 August 1977 (aged 21)	3	1	(Swedish Football Association) Bälinge IF
20	MF	Tina Nordlund	19 March 1977 (aged 22)	8	0	(Swedish Football Association) Umeå IK
