= UEFA Women's Euro 2001 squads =

Football tournament squads

This article lists all the confirmed national football squads for the UEFA Women's Euro 2001.

Players marked (c) were named as captain for their national squad.

== Group A ==
=== Germany ===
Head coach: (Germany) Tina Theune-Meyer

No.	Pos.	Player	Date of birth (age)	Caps	Goals	Club
1	GK	Silke Rottenberg	January 25, 1972 (aged 29)			(German Football Association) Brauweiler Pulheim
2	DF	Kerstin Stegemann	September 29, 1977 (aged 23)			(German Football Association) Heike Rheine
3	DF	Linda Bresonik	December 7, 1983 (aged 17)			(German Football Association) FCR 2001 Duisburg
4	DF	Steffi Jones	December 22, 1972 (aged 28)			(German Football Association) 1. FFC Frankfurt
5	DF	Doris Fitschen (c)	October 25, 1968 (aged 32)			(United States Soccer Federation) Philadelphia Charge
6	FW	Maren Meinert	August 5, 1973 (aged 27)			(United States Soccer Federation) Boston Breakers
7	MF	Pia Wunderlich	January 26, 1975 (aged 26)			(German Football Association) 1. FFC Frankfurt
8	FW	Sandra Smisek	July 3, 1977 (aged 23)			(German Football Association) FSV Frankfurt
9	FW	Birgit Prinz	October 25, 1977 (aged 23)			(German Football Association) 1. FFC Frankfurt
10	MF	Bettina Wiegmann	October 7, 1971 (aged 29)			(United States Soccer Federation) Boston Breakers
11	FW	Martina Müller	April 18, 1980 (aged 21)			(German Football Association) SC 07 Bad Neuenahr
12	FW	Claudia Müller	May 21, 1974 (aged 27)			(German Football Association) WSV Wolfsburg-Wendschott
13	DF	Sandra Minnert	April 7, 1973 (aged 28)			(German Football Association) 1. FFC Frankfurt
14	DF	Madleen Wilder	July 6, 1980 (aged 20)			(German Football Association) 1. FFC Turbine Potsdam
15	MF	Navina Omilade	November 3, 1981 (aged 19)			(German Football Association) Brauweiler Pulheim
16	MF	Renate Lingor	October 11, 1975 (aged 25)			(German Football Association) 1. FFC Frankfurt
17	DF	Ariane Hingst	July 25, 1979 (aged 21)			(German Football Association) 1. FFC Turbine Potsdam
18	FW	Petra Wimbersky	November 9, 1982 (aged 18)			(German Football Association) Bayern Munich
19	DF	Tina Wunderlich	October 10, 1977 (aged 23)			(German Football Association) 1. FFC Frankfurt
20	GK	Nadine Angerer	November 10, 1978 (aged 22)			(German Football Association) 1. FFC Turbine Potsdam

=== Sweden ===
Head coach: (Sweden) Marika Domanski-Lyfors

No.	Pos.	Player	Date of birth (age)	Caps	Goals	Club
1	GK	Caroline Jönsson	November 22, 1977 (aged 23)	19	0	(Swedish Football Association) Malmö FF
2	DF	Karolina Westberg	May 16, 1978 (aged 23)	54	0	(Swedish Football Association) Malmö FF
3	DF	Jane Törnqvist	May 9, 1975 (aged 26)	66	7	(Swedish Football Association) Älvsjö AIK
4	DF	Hanna Marklund	November 26, 1977 (aged 23)	34	0	(Swedish Football Association) Umeå IK
5	MF	Kristin Bengtsson	January 12, 1970 (aged 31)	100	8	(United States Soccer Federation) San Diego Spirit
6	MF	Malin Moström	August 1, 1975 (aged 25)	40	8	(Swedish Football Association) Umeå IK
7	DF	Sara Larsson	May 13, 1975 (aged 26)	14	0	(Swedish Football Association) Malmö FF
8	MF	Tina Nordlund	March 19, 1977 (aged 24)	36	6	(Swedish Football Association) Umeå IK
9	MF	Malin Andersson (c)	May 4, 1973 (aged 28)	97	27	(Swedish Football Association) Älvsjö AIK
10	FW	Hanna Ljungberg	January 8, 1979 (aged 22)	60	25	(Swedish Football Association) Umeå IK
11	FW	Victoria Svensson	May 18, 1975 (aged 26)	56	17	(Swedish Football Association) Älvsjö AIK
12	GK	Ulla-Karin Thelin	February 19, 1977 (aged 24)	6	0	(Swedish Football Association) Umeå IK
13	DF	Sofia Eriksson	May 11, 1979 (aged 22)	2	0	(Swedish Football Association) Umeå IK
14	MF	Linda Fagerström	March 17, 1977 (aged 24)	41	4	(Swedish Football Association) Hammarby IF
15	MF	Therese Sjögran	April 8, 1977 (aged 24)	27	1	(Swedish Football Association) Kristianstads DFF
16	FW	Elin Flyborg	October 5, 1976 (aged 24)	15	7	(Swedish Football Association) Djurgårdens IF
17	FW	Therese Lundin	March 3, 1979 (aged 22)	14	0	(Swedish Football Association) Malmö FF
18	DF	Frida Östberg	December 10, 1977 (aged 23)	2	0	(Swedish Football Association) Umeå IK
19	DF	Sara Call	July 16, 1977 (aged 23)	20	1	(Swedish Football Association) Bälinge IF
20	FW	Sara Johansson	January 23, 1980 (aged 21)	6	1	(Swedish Football Association) Djurgårdens IF

Sweden caps and goals based on compilation of match reports at https://www.svenskfotboll.se/landslag/dam/landskamper-1973-2000/ & https://www.svenskfotboll.se/landslag/dam/landskamper-2001-2010/

=== Russia ===
Head coach: (Russia) Yuri Bystritsky

No.	Pos.	Player	Date of birth (age)	Caps	Goals	Club
1	GK	Svetlana Petko	June 6, 1970 (aged 31)			(Russian Football Union) CSK VVS Samara
2	DF	Olga Karasseva	October 5, 1975 (aged 25)			(Russian Football Union) CSK VVS Samara
3	DF	Marina Burakova	May 8, 1966 (aged 35)			(Russian Football Union) Energiya Voronezh
4	DF	Elena Jikhareva	July 8, 1974 (aged 26)			(Russian Football Union) Ryazan VDV
5	DF	Natalia Filippova	February 7, 1975 (aged 26)			(Russian Football Union) CSK VVS Samara
6	MF	Galina Komarova	August 12, 1977 (aged 23)			(Russian Football Union) CSK VVS Samara
7	MF	Tatiana Egorova	March 10, 1970 (aged 31)			(Russian Football Union) Lada Toliatti
8	FW	Irina Grigorieva (c)	February 21, 1972 (aged 29)			(Russian Football Union) CSK VVS Samara
9	MF	Alexandra Svetlitskaya	August 20, 1971 (aged 29)			(Russian Football Union) Lada Toliatti
10	FW	Natalia Barbashina	August 26, 1973 (aged 27)			(Russian Football Union) Ryazan VDV
11	FW	Olga Letyushova	December 29, 1975 (aged 25)			(Russian Football Union) Ryazan VDV
12	GK	Larissa Kapitonova	May 4, 1970 (aged 31)			(Russian Football Union) Ryazan VDV
13	MF	Oxana Shmachkova	June 20, 1981 (aged 20)			(Russian Football Union) Ryazan VDV
14	DF	Natalia Karasseva	April 30, 1977 (aged 24)			(Russian Football Union) Lada Toliatti
15	MF	Elena Fomina	April 5, 1979 (aged 22)			(Russian Football Union) Chertanovo Moscow
16	FW	Olga Kremleva	October 9, 1974 (aged 26)			(Russian Football Union) CSK VVS Samara
17	MF	Tatyana Skotnikova	November 27, 1978 (aged 22)			(Russian Football Union) Lada Toliatti
18	MF	Anastassia Pustovoitova	February 10, 1981 (aged 20)			(Russian Football Union) Ryazan VDV
19	DF	Yulia Issaeva	June 30, 1977 (aged 23)			(Russian Football Union) CSK VVS Samara
20	GK	Tatiana Pichugova	May 16, 1979 (aged 22)			(Russian Football Union) Chertanovo Moscow

=== England ===
Head coach: (England) Hope Powell

No.	Pos.	Player	Date of birth (age)	Caps	Goals	Club
1	GK	Pauline Cope	February 16, 1969 (aged 32)			(The Football Association) Charlton Athletic
2	DF	Danielle Murphy	June 4, 1981 (aged 20)			(United States Soccer Federation) Florida Gators
3	DF	Rachel Unitt	June 5, 1982 (aged 19)			(The Football Association) Everton
4	MF	Becky Easton	April 16, 1974 (aged 27)			(The Football Association) Doncaster Belles
5	DF	Mo Marley (c)	January 31, 1967 (aged 34)			(The Football Association) Everton
6	DF	Katie Chapman	June 15, 1982 (aged 19)			(The Football Association) Fulham
7	MF	Karen Burke	June 14, 1971 (aged 30)			(The Football Association) Doncaster Belles
8	MF	Tara Proctor	January 31, 1971 (aged 30)			(The Football Association) Charlton Athletic
9	FW	Kelly Smith	October 29, 1978 (aged 22)			(United States Soccer Federation) Philadelphia Charge
10	FW	Angela Banks	December 23, 1975 (aged 25)			(The Football Association) Arsenal
11	MF	Sue Smith	November 24, 1979 (aged 21)			(The Football Association) Tranmere Rovers
12	DF	Faye White	February 2, 1978 (aged 23)			(The Football Association) Arsenal
13	GK	Leanne Hall	May 19, 1980 (aged 21)			(The Football Association) Doncaster Belles
14	DF	Julie Fletcher	September 28, 1974 (aged 26)			(The Football Association) Charlton Athletic
15	MF	Samantha Britton	December 8, 1973 (aged 27)			(The Football Association) Everton
16	FW	Marieanne Spacey	December 13, 1966 (aged 34)			(The Football Association) Arsenal
17	FW	Rachel Yankey	November 1, 1979 (aged 21)			(The Football Association) Fulham
18	FW	Karen Walker	July 29, 1969 (aged 31)			(The Football Association) Doncaster Belles
19	MF	Vicky Exley	October 22, 1975 (aged 25)			(The Football Association) Doncaster Belles
20	GK	Rachel Brown	July 2, 1980 (aged 20)			(United States Soccer Federation) Pittsburgh Panthers

== Group B ==
=== Denmark ===
Head coach: (Denmark) Poul Højmose

No.	Pos.	Player	Date of birth (age)	Caps	Goals	Club
1	GK	Heidi Johansen	9 June 1983 (aged 18)			(Danish Football Association) OB
2	DF	Ulla Knudsen	21 June 1976 (aged 25)			(Danish Football Association) HEI Aarhus
3	DF	Katrine Pedersen	13 April 1977 (aged 24)			(Danish Football Association) HEI Aarhus
4	DF	Lene Terp (c)	15 April 1973 (aged 28)			(Danish Football Association) OB
5	DF	Gitte Andersen	28 April 1977 (aged 24)			(Danish Football Association) Brøndby IF
6	MF	Cathrine Sørensen	14 June 1978 (aged 23)			(Danish Football Association) Brøndby IF
7	DF	Julie Hauge Andersson	2 January 1970 (aged 31)			(Danish Football Association) OB
8	FW	Lene Jensen	17 March 1976 (aged 25)			(Danish Football Association) HEI Aarhus
9	FW	Christina Petersen	17 September 1974 (aged 26)			(Danish Football Association) Fortuna Hjørring
10	FW	Gitte Krogh	13 May 1977 (aged 24)			(Danish Football Association) OB
11	FW	Merete Pedersen	30 June 1973 (aged 27)			(Danish Football Association) OB
12	MF	Nadia Kjældgaard	2 November 1978 (aged 22)			(Danish Football Association) HEI Aarhus
13	FW	Julie Rydahl Bukh	9 January 1981 (aged 20)			(Danish Football Association) Vejle B
14	MF	Lise Søndergaard	27 October 1973 (aged 27)			(Danish Football Association) HEI Aarhus
15	DF	Mitzi Møller	2 October 1979 (aged 21)			(Danish Football Association) Hillerød G&IF
16	GK	Tine Cederkvist	21 March 1979 (aged 22)			(Danish Football Association) Hillerød G&IF
17	MF	Christina Bonde	28 September 1973 (aged 27)			(Danish Football Association) Fortuna Hjørring
18	FW	Mette Jokumsen	11 February 1977 (aged 24)			(Danish Football Association) HEI Aarhus
19	MF	Anja Møller	11 May 1978 (aged 23)			(Danish Football Association) Hillerød G&IF
20	FW	Janne Madsen	12 March 1978 (aged 23)			(Danish Football Association) Fortuna Hjørring

=== Norway ===
Head coach: (Norway) Åge Steen

No.	Pos.	Player	Date of birth (age)	Caps	Goals	Club
1	GK	Bente Nordby	July 23, 1974 (aged 26)			(United States Soccer Federation) Carolina Courage
2	DF	Brit Sandaune	June 5, 1972 (aged 29)			(Norwegian Football Federation) Trondheims-Ørn
3	DF	Gøril Kringen (c)	January 28, 1972 (aged 29)			(Norwegian Football Federation) Trondheims-Ørn
4	DF	Anne Tønnessen	March 18, 1974 (aged 27)			(Norwegian Football Federation) Kolbotn
5	DF	Bente Kvitland	June 23, 1974 (aged 27)			(Norwegian Football Federation) Trondheims-Ørn
6	MF	Hege Riise	July 18, 1969 (aged 31)			(United States Soccer Federation) Carolina Courage
7	MF	Solveig Gulbrandsen	January 12, 1981 (aged 20)			(Norwegian Football Federation) Kolbotn
8	MF	Monica Knudsen	March 25, 1975 (aged 26)			(Norwegian Football Federation) Asker
9	FW	Ragnhild Gulbrandsen	February 22, 1977 (aged 24)			(Norwegian Football Federation) Trondheims-Ørn
10	MF	Unni Lehn	June 7, 1977 (aged 24)			(Norwegian Football Federation) Trondheims-Ørn
11	FW	Margunn Haugenes	January 25, 1970 (aged 31)			(The Football Association) Fulham
12	GK	Ingeborg Hovland	October 3, 1969 (aged 31)			(Norwegian Football Federation) Klepp IL
13	DF	Henriette Viker	August 5, 1973 (aged 27)			(Norwegian Football Federation) Asker
14	FW	Dagny Mellgren	June 19, 1976 (aged 25)			(United States Soccer Federation) Boston Breakers
15	DF	Ane Stangeland	June 2, 1980 (aged 21)			(Norwegian Football Federation) Klepp IL
16	MF	Christine Bøe Jensen	June 3, 1975 (aged 26)			(Norwegian Football Federation) Kolbotn
17	FW	Anita Rapp	July 24, 1977 (aged 23)			(Norwegian Football Federation) Asker
18	FW	Linda Ørmen	March 22, 1977 (aged 24)			(Norwegian Football Federation) Kolbotn
19	DF	Anne Bugge-Paulsen	June 29, 1979 (aged 21)			(Norwegian Football Federation) Arna-Bjørnar
20	MF	Trine Rønning	June 14, 1982 (aged 19)			(Norwegian Football Federation) Trondheims-Ørn

=== Italy ===
Head coach: (Italy) Carolina Morace

No.	Pos.	Player	Date of birth (age)	Caps	Goals	Club
1	GK	Giorgia Brenzan (c)	August 21, 1967 (aged 33)			(Italian Football Federation) Foroni Verona
2	DF	Monica Caprini	May 15, 1974 (aged 27)			(Italian Football Federation) Ruco Line Lazio
3	DF	Daniela Tavalazzi	August 8, 1972 (aged 28)			(Italian Football Federation) Torres
4	DF	Giulia Perelli	April 23, 1982 (aged 19)			(Italian Football Federation) Pisa CF
5	DF	Goia Masia	January 22, 1977 (aged 24)			(Italian Football Federation) Torres
6	DF	Adele Frollani	August 4, 1974 (aged 26)			(Italian Football Federation) Ruco Line Lazio
7	MF	Damiana Deiana	June 26, 1970 (aged 30)			(Italian Football Federation) Torres
8	MF	Marina Pellizzer	February 8, 1972 (aged 29)			(Italian Football Federation) Foroni Verona
9	FW	Patrizia Panico	February 8, 1975 (aged 26)			(Italian Football Federation) Ruco Line Lazio
10	MF	Tatiana Zorri	October 19, 1977 (aged 23)			(Italian Football Federation) Ruco Line Lazio
11	FW	Rita Guarino	January 31, 1971 (aged 30)			(Italian Football Federation) Torres
12	GK	Fabiana Comin	March 20, 1970 (aged 31)			(Italian Football Federation) Bardolino Verona
13	DF	Manuela Tesse	February 28, 1976 (aged 25)			(Italian Football Federation) Foroni Verona
14	MF	Federica D'Astolfo	October 27, 1966 (aged 34)			(Italian Football Federation) Foroni Verona
15	DF	Anna Duo	August 8, 1972 (aged 28)			(Italian Football Federation) Ruco Line Lazio
16	MF	Piera-Cassandra Maglio	January 30, 1976 (aged 25)			(Italian Football Federation) Bardolino Verona
17	FW	Silvia Tagliacarne	August 8, 1975 (aged 25)			(Italian Football Federation) ACF Milan
18	FW	Teresina Marsico	February 7, 1976 (aged 25)			(Italian Football Federation) AC Gravina
19	MF	Samantha Ceroni	February 26, 1973 (aged 28)			(Italian Football Federation) Ruco Line Lazio
20	GK	Carla Brunozzi	April 20, 1976 (aged 25)			(Italian Football Federation) Atletico Dristano

=== France ===
Head coach: (France) Élisabeth Loisel

No.	Pos.	Player	Date of birth (age)	Caps	Goals	Club
1	GK	Corinne Lagache	December 9, 1975 (aged 25)			(French Football Federation) La Roche ESOF
2	DF	Emmanuelle Sykora	February 21, 1976 (aged 25)			(French Football Federation) Olympique Lyonnais
3	DF	Élodie Woock	January 13, 1976 (aged 25)			(French Football Federation) Toulouse FC
4	DF	Sabrina Viguier	January 4, 1981 (aged 20)			(French Football Federation) Toulouse FC
5	DF	Corinne Diacre (c)	August 4, 1974 (aged 26)			(French Football Federation) ASJ Soyaux
6	MF	Sandrine Soubeyrand	August 16, 1973 (aged 27)			(French Football Federation) FCF Juvisy
7	MF	Stephanie Mugneret-Beghe	March 22, 1974 (aged 27)			(French Football Federation) FCF Juvisy
8	MF	Gaëlle Blouin	August 14, 1972 (aged 28)			(French Football Federation) Toulouse FC
9	FW	Anne Zenoni	March 26, 1971 (aged 30)			(French Football Federation) Toulouse FC
10	MF	Françoise Jezequel	March 30, 1970 (aged 31)			(French Football Federation) Saint-Brieuc
11	FW	Marinette Pichon	November 26, 1975 (aged 25)			(French Football Federation) Saint-Memmie Olympique
12	MF	Sarah M'Barek	October 13, 1977 (aged 23)			(French Football Federation) La Roche ESOF
13	FW	Marie Kubiak	May 11, 1981 (aged 20)			(French Football Federation) Olympique Lyonnais
14	DF	Aline Riera	January 21, 1972 (aged 29)			(French Football Federation) FCF Juvisy
15	FW	Angélique Roujas	September 15, 1974 (aged 26)			(French Football Federation) La Roche ESOF
16	GK	Céline Marty	March 30, 1976 (aged 25)			(French Football Federation) Toulouse FC
17	MF	Severine Lecoufle	March 31, 1975 (aged 26)			(French Football Federation) ES Cormelles
18	FW	Hoda Lattaf	August 31, 1978 (aged 22)			(French Football Federation) La Roche ESOF
19	FW	Candie Herbert	June 4, 1977 (aged 24)			(French Football Federation) ASJ Soyaux
20	DF	Sonia Bompastor	June 8, 1980 (aged 21)			(French Football Federation) La Roche ESOF
