= UEFA Women's Euro 1997 squads =

List of all the confirmed national football squads for the UEFA Women's Euro 1997

This article lists all the confirmed national football squads for the UEFA Women's Euro 1997.

Players marked (c) were named as captain for their national squad.

== Group A ==
=== France ===
Head coach: (France) Aimé Mignot

No.	Pos.	Player	Date of birth (age)	Caps	Goals	Club
1	GK	Sandrine Roux (c)	22 December 1966 (aged 30)			(French Football Federation) VGA Saint-Maur
2	DF	Hélène Hillion-Guillemin	2 January 1969 (aged 28)			(French Football Federation) FCF Juvisy
3	DF	Laëtitia Gravier	3 July 1978 (aged 18)			(French Football Federation) FC Vendenheim
4	DF	Cécile Locatelli	12 November 1970 (aged 26)			(French Football Federation) Lyon
5	DF	Corinne Diacre	4 August 1974 (aged 22)			(French Football Federation) ASJ Soyaux
6	MF	Elodie Woock	13 January 1976 (aged 21)			(French Football Federation) Toulouse FC
7	FW	Candie Herbert	4 June 1977 (aged 20)			(French Football Federation) USO Bruay-la-Buissière
8	MF	Jocelyne Gout	10 March 1968 (aged 29)			(French Football Federation) Lyon
9	FW	Anne Zenoni	26 March 1971 (aged 26)			(French Football Federation) Toulouse FC
10	DF	Sandrine Ringler	10 September 1973 (aged 23)			(French Football Federation) FC Vendenheim
11	FW	Marinette Pichon	26 November 1975 (aged 21)			(French Football Federation) Saint-Memmie Olympique
12	MF	Aude Banasiak	8 October 1975 (aged 21)			(French Football Federation) Saint-Memmie Olympique
13	DF	Elodie Jacq	29 June 1975 (aged 22)			(French Football Federation) La Roche-sur-Yon
14	MF	Sandrine Soubeyrand	16 August 1973 (aged 23)			(French Football Federation) SC Caluire
15	FW	Angélique Roujas	15 September 1974 (aged 22)			(French Football Federation) La Roche-sur-Yon
16	GK	Céline Marty	30 March 1976 (aged 21)			(French Football Federation) Toulouse FC
17	MF	Stéphanie Mugneret-Béghé	22 March 1974 (aged 23)			(French Football Federation) FCF Juvisy
18	FW	Stéphanie Trognon	18 October 1976 (aged 20)			(French Football Federation) ASPTT Strasbourg
19	DF	Emmanuelle Sykora	21 February 1976 (aged 21)			(French Football Federation) Lyon
20	GK	Sandrine Capy	19 January 1969 (aged 28)			(French Football Federation) FCF Juvisy

=== Russia ===
Head coach: (Russia) Yuri Bystritsky

No.	Pos.	Player	Date of birth (age)	Caps	Goals	Club
1	GK	Svetlana Petko	6 June 1970 (aged 27)			(Russian Football Union) CSK VVS Samara
2	DF	Alena Dmitrienko	2 October 1974 (aged 22)			(Russian Football Union) FC Energy Voronezh
3	DF	Marina Burakova	8 May 1966 (aged 31)			(Russian Football Union) FC Energy Voronezh
4	DF	Elena Denschik	11 November 1973 (aged 23)			(Russian Football Union) FC Energy Voronezh
5	DF	Tatiana Cheverda	29 August 1974 (aged 22)			(Russian Football Union) FC Energy Voronezh
6	MF	Galina Komarova	12 August 1977 (aged 19)			(Russian Football Union) CSK VVS Samara
7	MF	Tatiana Egorova	10 March 1970 (aged 27)			(Russian Football Union) CSK VVS Samara
8	FW	Irina Grigorieva (c)	21 January 1972 (aged 25)			(Russian Football Union) CSK VVS Samara
9	MF	Alexandra Svetlitskaya	20 August 1970 (aged 26)			(Russian Football Union) CSK VVS Samara
10	FW	Elena Kononova	17 August 1969 (aged 27)			(Russian Football Union) CSK VVS Samara
11	FW	Larisa Savina	25 November 1970 (aged 26)			(Russian Football Union) CSK VVS Samara
12	GK	Larissa Kapitonova	4 May 1970 (aged 27)			(Russian Football Union) Ryazan VDV
13	DF	Natalia Kapkova	10 August 1971 (aged 25)			(Russian Football Union) FC Chertanovo Moscow
14	DF	Marina Dikareva	1 May 1975 (aged 22)			(Russian Football Union) Sibiryachka Krasnoyarsk
15	MF	Elena Lissacheva	25 November 1973 (aged 23)			(Russian Football Union) FC Lada Togliatti
16	MF	Valentina Barkova	17 March 1971 (aged 26)			(Russian Football Union) Ryazan VDV
17	MF	Natalia Barbashina	26 August 1973 (aged 23)			(Russian Football Union) FC Energy Voronezh
18	DF	Elena Golovko	14 December 1975 (aged 21)			(Russian Football Union) CSK VVS Samara
19	DF	Svetlana Matveeva				
20	DF	Yulia Issaeva	30 June 1977 (aged 19)			(Russian Football Union) Kaluzhanka Kaluga

=== Spain ===
Head coach: (Spain) Ignacio Quereda

No.	Pos.	Player	Date of birth (age)	Caps	Goals	Club
1	GK	Roser Serra	30 August 1971 (aged 25)			(Royal Spanish Football Federation) FC Barcelona
2	DF	Marina Nohalez	5 July 1974 (aged 22)			(Royal Spanish Football Federation) EFB Torrent
3	DF	Judith Corominas	10 November 1966 (aged 30)			(Royal Spanish Football Federation) FC Barcelona
4	DF	Antonia Is	13 June 1966 (aged 31)			(Royal Spanish Football Federation) Tradehi CFF
5	DF	Arantza del Puerto (c)	8 May 1971 (aged 26)			(Royal Spanish Football Federation) Añorga KKE
6	MF	Beatriz García	23 April 1970 (aged 27)			(Royal Spanish Football Federation) Añorga KKE
7	MF	Rosa Castillo	12 December 1974 (aged 22)			(Royal Spanish Football Federation) CD Híspalis
8	MF	Marisa Puñal	29 May 1971 (aged 26)			(Royal Spanish Football Federation) Parque Alcobendas CF
9	FW	Mar Prieto	1 March 1969 (aged 28)			(Royal Spanish Football Federation) CD Oroquieta Villaverde
10	MF	Alicia Fuentes	27 May 1978 (aged 19)			(Royal Spanish Football Federation) Atlético Málaga
11	FW	Yolanda Mateos	26 February 1976 (aged 21)			(Royal Spanish Football Federation) Eibartarrak FT
12	DF	Maider Castillo	3 August 1976 (aged 20)			(Royal Spanish Football Federation) Eibartarrak FT
13	GK	Elixabete Capa	20 March 1978 (aged 19)			(Royal Spanish Football Federation) Añorga KKE
14	MF	Vanesa Gimbert	19 April 1980 (aged 17)			(Royal Spanish Football Federation) Mondelia CF
15	MF	Isabel Parejo	22 March 1969 (aged 28)			(Italian Football Federation) Olbia CF
16	MF	Palmira Chivite	4 April 1971 (aged 26)			(Royal Spanish Football Federation) Municipal de Corella
17	DF	Silvia Zarza	30 April 1977 (aged 20)			(Royal Spanish Football Federation) ADFF Butarque
18	FW	Auxi Jiménez	11 January 1975 (aged 22)			(Royal Spanish Football Federation) Atlético Málaga
19	FW	Ángeles Parejo	22 March 1969 (aged 28)			(Italian Football Federation) Torres
20	GK	Arrate Guisasola	5 February 1979 (aged 18)			(Royal Spanish Football Federation) Eibartarrak FT

=== Sweden ===
Head coach: (Sweden) Marika Domanski-Lyfors

No.	Pos.	Player	Date of birth (age)	Caps	Goals	Club
1	GK	Annelie Nilsson	14 June 1971 (aged 26)	32	0	(Swedish Football Association) Sunnanå SK
2	DF	Karolina Westberg	16 May 1978 (aged 19)	2	0	(Swedish Football Association) Malmö FF
3	DF	Jane Törnqvist	9 May 1975 (aged 22)	9	1	(Swedish Football Association) Hammarby IF DFF
4	DF	Åsa Lönnqvist	14 April 1970 (aged 27)	36	1	(Swedish Football Association) Älvsjö AIK
5	DF	Kristin Bengtsson	12 January 1970 (aged 27)	58	3	(Swedish Football Association) Öxabäcks IF
6	MF	Anna Pohjanen	25 January 1974 (aged 23)	35	7	(Swedish Football Association) Sunnanå SK
7	MF	Malin Allberg	5 May 1975 (aged 22)	8	1	(Swedish Football Association) Älvsjö AIK
8	MF	Malin Swedberg (c)	15 September 1968 (aged 28)	60	9	(Swedish Football Association) Älvsjö AIK
9	MF	Malin Andersson	4 May 1973 (aged 24)	45	15	(Swedish Football Association) Älvsjö AIK
10	FW	Hanna Ljungberg	8 January 1979 (aged 18)	12	1	(Swedish Football Association) Sunnanå SK
11	FW	Victoria Svensson	18 May 1975 (aged 22)	6	1	(Swedish Football Association) Jitex BK
12	GK	Ulrika Karlsson	14 October 1970 (aged 26)	11	0	(Swedish Football Association) Bälinge IF
13	MF	Anneli Wahlgren	15 April 1973 (aged 24)	15	3	(Swedish Football Association) Bälinge IF
14	MF	Eva Zeikfalvy	18 April 1967 (aged 30)	63	2	(Swedish Football Association) Malmö FF
15	MF	Camilla Andersson	3 July 1967 (aged 29)			(Swedish Football Association) Älvsjö AIK
16	FW	Christin Lilja	7 January 1975 (aged 22)	2	0	(Swedish Football Association) Lotorps IF
17	DF	Eva Larsson	27 February 1973 (aged 24)			(Swedish Football Association) Älvsjö AIK
18	FW	Carina Håkansson	15 September 1969 (aged 27)	2	0	(Swedish Football Association) Landvetter IF
19	FW	Kristin Jonsson	15 March 1974 (aged 23)	14	1	(Swedish Football Association) Sunnanå SK
20	MF	Cecilia Sandell	10 June 1968 (aged 29)	17	0	(Swedish Football Association) Älvsjö AIK

Sweden caps and goals based on compilation of match reports at https://www.svenskfotboll.se/landslag/dam/landskamper-1973-2000/

== Group B ==
=== Denmark ===
Head coach: (Denmark) Jørgen Hvidemose

No.	Pos.	Player	Date of birth (age)	Caps	Goals	Club
1	GK	Dorthe Larsen	8 August 1969 (aged 27)	40	0	(Danish Football Association) Fortuna Hjørring
2	DF	Karina Sefron	2 July 1967 (aged 29)	64	0	(German Football Association) SG Praunheim
3	DF	Bonny Madsen	10 August 1967 (aged 29)	68	3	(Italian Football Federation) ACF Lugo
4	DF	Lene Terp	15 April 1973 (aged 24)	36	0	(Danish Football Association) OB
5	DF	Kamma Flæng	30 March 1976 (aged 21)	33	7	(Danish Football Association) Vorup FB
6	MF	Anne Dot Eggers Nielsen	6 November 1975 (aged 21)	42	7	(Danish Football Association) Hjortshøj-Egå IF
7	MF	Louise Hansen	4 May 1975 (aged 22)	10	0	(German Football Association) Sportfreunde Siegen
8	MF	Rikke Holm (c)	22 March 1972 (aged 25)	50	9	(Danish Football Association) Hjortshøj-Egå IF
9	FW	Janni Lund Johansen	14 January 1976 (aged 21)	6	1	(Danish Football Association) BK Rødovre
10	FW	Gitte Krogh	13 May 1977 (aged 20)	41	18	(Danish Football Association) Hjortshøj-Egå IF
11	FW	Merete Pedersen	30 June 1973 (aged 23)	17	1	(Danish Football Association) OB
12	DF	Hanne Sand	22 September 1973 (aged 23)	9	0	(Danish Football Association) Fortuna Hjørring
13	MF	Christina Petersen	17 September 1974 (aged 22)	34	5	(Danish Football Association) Fortuna Hjørring
14	MF	Irene Stelling	25 July 1971 (aged 25)	55	2	(Danish Football Association) Hjortshøj-Egå IF
15	MF	Katrine Pedersen	13 April 1977 (aged 20)	28	1	(Danish Football Association) Hjortshøj-Egå IF
16	GK	Christina Jensen	21 January 1974 (aged 23)	5	0	(Danish Football Association) OB
17	FW	Hanne Nørregaard	21 December 1968 (aged 28)	9	4	(Danish Football Association) Brøndby IF
18	MF	Jeanne Axelsen	3 January 1968 (aged 29)	15	2	(Danish Football Association) BK Rødovre
19	MF	Marlene Kristensen	28 May 1973 (aged 24)	3	0	(Danish Football Association) OB
20	GK	Helle Bjerregaard	21 June 1968 (aged 29)	56	0	(Danish Football Association) Brøndby IF

=== Germany ===
Head coach: (Germany) Tina Theune-Meyer

No.	Pos.	Player	Date of birth (age)	Caps	Goals	Club
1	GK	Silke Rottenberg	25 January 1972 (aged 25)			(German Football Association) Sportfreunde Siegen
2	DF	Kerstin Stegemann	29 September 1977 (aged 19)			(German Football Association) FFC Heike Rheine
3	DF	Sandra Minnert	7 April 1973 (aged 24)			(German Football Association) FSV Frankfurt
4	DF	Steffi Jones	22 December 1972 (aged 24)			(German Football Association) FSV Frankfurt
5	DF	Doris Fitschen	25 October 1968 (aged 28)			(German Football Association) 1. FFC Frankfurt
6	MF	Pia Wunderlich	26 January 1975 (aged 22)			(German Football Association) 1. FFC Frankfurt
7	FW	Claudia Müller	21 May 1974 (aged 23)			(German Football Association) 1. FFC Frankfurt
8	MF	Bettina Wiegmann	7 October 1971 (aged 25)			(German Football Association) FFC Brauweiler Pulheim
9	FW	Birgit Prinz	25 October 1977 (aged 19)			(German Football Association) FSV Frankfurt
10	MF	Martina Voss (c)	22 December 1967 (aged 29)			(German Football Association) FCR Duisburg 55
11	MF	Maren Meinert	5 August 1973 (aged 23)			(German Football Association) FCR Duisburg 55
12	GK	Nadine Angerer	10 November 1978 (aged 18)			(German Football Association) FC Wacker München
13	DF	Claudia Klein	24 September 1971 (aged 25)			(German Football Association) FFC Brauweiler Pulheim
14	MF	Melanie Hoffmann	29 November 1974 (aged 22)			(German Football Association) FCR Duisburg 55
15	DF	Sonja Fuss	11 May 1978 (aged 19)			(German Football Association) FFC Brauweiler Pulheim
16	GK	Claudia von Lanken	3 June 1977 (aged 20)			(German Football Association) FFC Heike Rheine
17	MF	Ariane Hingst	25 July 1979 (aged 17)			(German Football Association) 1. FFC Turbine Potsdam
18	MF	Sandra Smisek	3 July 1977 (aged 19)			(German Football Association) FSV Frankfurt
19	DF	Inken Beeken	2 September 1978 (aged 18)			(German Football Association) Tennis Borussia Berlin
20	FW	Monika Meyer	23 June 1972 (aged 25)			(German Football Association) Sportfreunde Siegen

=== Italy ===
Head coach: (Italy) Sergio Guenza

No.	Pos.	Player	Date of birth (age)	Caps	Goals	Club
1	GK	Giorgia Brenzan	21 August 1967 (aged 29)			(Italian Football Federation) Torres Sardi
2	DF	Damiana Deiana	26 June 1970 (aged 27)			(Italian Football Federation) Torres Sardi
3	MF	Daniela Tavalazzi	8 August 1972 (aged 24)			(Italian Football Federation) Cascine Vica
4	DF	Emma Iozzelli	12 June 1966 (aged 31)			(Italian Football Federation) Agliana
5	DF	Raffaella Salmaso	16 April 1968 (aged 29)			(Italian Football Federation) Modena
6	MF	Federica D'Astolfo	27 October 1966 (aged 30)			(Italian Football Federation) Modena
7	FW	Silvia Fiorini	24 December 1969 (aged 27)			(Italian Football Federation) Agliana
8	MF	Antonella Carta	1 March 1967 (aged 30)			(Italian Football Federation) Lugo
9	FW	Carolina Morace (c)	5 February 1964 (aged 33)			(Italian Football Federation) Modena
10	MF	Florinda Ciardi	29 August 1970 (aged 26)			(Italian Football Federation) Picenum
11	FW	Patrizia Panico	8 February 1975 (aged 22)			(Italian Football Federation) Torino
12	GK	Stefania Antonini	10 October 1970 (aged 26)			(Italian Football Federation) Modena
13	DF	Marinella Piolanti	15 May 1973 (aged 24)			(Italian Football Federation) Lugo
14	FW	Roberta Ulivi	8 February 1971 (aged 26)			(Italian Football Federation) Lugo
15	DF	Elisa Miniati	6 January 1974 (aged 23)			(Italian Football Federation) Torino
16	DF	Silvia Nannini	14 July 1971 (aged 25)			(Italian Football Federation) Agliana
17	MF	Manuela Tesse	28 February 1976 (aged 21)			(Italian Football Federation) Modena
18	FW	Rita Guarino	31 January 1971 (aged 26)			(Italian Football Federation) Cascine Vica
19	MF	Cristina Murelli	21 April 1970 (aged 27)			(Italian Football Federation) Milan
20	GK	Monica Di Bernardo	2 October 1971 (aged 25)			

=== Norway ===
Head coach: (Norway) Per-Mathias Høgmo

No.	Pos.	Player	Date of birth (age)	Caps	Goals	Club
1	GK	Bente Nordby	23 July 1974 (aged 22)	47	0	(Norwegian Football Federation) Athene Moss
2	DF	Gøril Kringen	28 January 1972 (aged 25)	9	0	(Norwegian Football Federation) SK Trondheims-Ørn
3	DF	Gro Espeseth (c)	30 October 1972 (aged 24)	85	7	(Norwegian Football Federation) IL Sandviken
4	DF	Agnete Carlsen	14 January 1971 (aged 26)	94	17	(Japan Football Association) Nikko
5	DF	Anne Nymark Andersen	28 September 1972 (aged 24)	49	9	(Norwegian Football Federation) IL Sandviken
6	MF	Hege Riise	18 July 1969 (aged 27)	89	38	(Japan Football Association) Nikko
7	MF	Unni Lehn	7 June 1977 (aged 20)	8	2	(Norwegian Football Federation) SK Trondheims-Ørn
8	MF	Heidi Støre	4 July 1963 (aged 33)	148	21	(Japan Football Association) Nikko
9	FW	Ann Kristin Aarønes	19 January 1973 (aged 24)	82	50	(Norwegian Football Federation) SK Trondheims-Ørn
10	FW	Marianne Pettersen	12 April 1975 (aged 22)	41	27	(Norwegian Football Federation) Asker
11	FW	Linda Medalen	17 June 1965 (aged 32)	120	59	(Japan Football Association) Nikko
12	GK	Astrid Johannessen	10 January 1978 (aged 19)	3	0	(Norwegian Football Federation) Asker
13	DF	Henriette Viker	5 August 1973 (aged 23)	9	0	(Norwegian Football Federation) Asker
14	DF	Merete Myklebust	16 May 1973 (aged 24)	55	2	(Norwegian Football Federation) SK Trondheims-Ørn
15	FW	Ragnhild Gulbrandsen	22 February 1977 (aged 20)	5	2	(Norwegian Football Federation) SK Trondheims-Ørn
16	MF	Margunn Haugenes	25 October 1970 (aged 26)	31	3	(Norwegian Football Federation) Bjørnar IL
17	MF	Monica Knudsen	25 March 1975 (aged 22)	10	2	(Norwegian Football Federation) Asker
18	MF	Brit Sandaune	5 June 1972 (aged 25)	24	6	(Norwegian Football Federation) SK Trondheims-Ørn
19	FW	Randi Leinan	9 April 1968 (aged 29)	19	8	(Norwegian Football Federation) Kolbotn
20	GK	Ingeborg Hovland	3 October 1969 (aged 27)	2	0	(Norwegian Football Federation) Klepp IL
