= List of Mexico women's international footballers =

This is a non-exhaustive list of Mexico women's international footballers – association football players who have appeared at least once for the senior Mexico women's national football team.

== Players ==
Key
**Bold**	Named to the national team in the past year

Name	Caps	Goals	National team years	Club(s)	Ref.
Jackie Acevedo	1	0	2013	Retired	
Bárbara Almaraz				Retired	
Emily Alvarado	19	0	2019–	(Mexico) Tijuana	
Mónica Alvarado	21	0	2009–2015	(Mexico) UNAM	
Nancy Antonio	24	1	2015–	(Mexico) América	
Mirelle Arciniega	3	1	2020	Retired	
**Aylín Aviléz**	2	0	2022-	(Mexico) América	
**Esthefanny Barreras**	19	0	2016–	(Mexico) Pachuca	
**Karol Bernal**	3	0	2023–	(Mexico) Monterrey	
**Rebeca Bernal**	65	7	2016–	Unattached	
**Christina Burkenroad**	11	5	2023–	(Mexico) Monterrey	
Mariana Cadena	3	0	2017–	(Mexico) Pachuca	
Ariana Calderón	14	2	2014–2018	Retired	
**Scarlett Camberos**	18	2	2022–	(Mexico) América	
**Bri Campos**	3	0	2017–2021	Retired	
**Jasmine Casarez**	6	4	2023–	(Mexico) Juárez	
Atzimba Casas	1	0	2020	Retired	
María de Jesús Castillo				Retired	
Alicia Cervantes	10	9	2021-	(Mexico) Guadalajara	
Charlyn Corral	71	35	2008–	(Mexico) Pachuca	
Dolce Costa	1	1	2006	Retired	
María Guadalupe Cruzaley	1	0	2015	Retired	
**Renae Cuéllar**	39	10	2008–2019	Retired	
**Casandra Cuevas**	1	0	2024–	(Mexico) Toluca	
Lucero Cuevas	1	0	2017–	Retired	
**Myra Delgadillo**	5	1	2021–	(Mexico) Pachuca	
**Alexia Delgado**	34	1	2019–	(Mexico) UANL	
Karen Díaz	1	0	2019–	(Mexico) Tijuana	
Marylin Díaz			2010	Retired	
Nayeli Díaz	2	0	2021–	(Mexico) Pachuca	
Maribel Domínguez	116	82	1998–2016	Retired	
Luz Duarte	4	2	2014–	Retired	
**Celeste Espino**	3	0	2024–	(Mexico) América	
Daniela Espinosa	21	0	2018–	(Mexico) América	
**Greta Espinoza**	56	5	2014–	(Mexico) UANL	
Diana Evangelista	5	0	2019–	(Mexico) Monterrey	
Janelly Farías	13	0	2007–	(Mexico) Juárez	
**Blanca Félix**	2	0	2017–	(Mexico) Guadalajara	
**Cristina Ferral**	48	2	2017–	(Mexico) UANL	
Mónica Flores	12	0	2016–2023	Retired	
Sabrina Flores	1	0	2018	Retired	
Silvana Flores	1	0	2021–	(Mexico) UNAM	
Vanessa Flores	1	0	2017–	Retired	
Yamile Franco	13	1	2012–	(Mexico) Guadalajara	
**Diana García**	23	3	2020–	(Mexico) Monterrey	
Natalie Garcia	9	0	2010–2012	Retired	
Alina Garciamendez	51	1	2009–2016	Retired	
Dinora Garza	30	5	2011–	(Mexico) Atlético San Luis	
Monica Gerardo	30	15	1998–2002	Retired	
Alejandría Godínez	2	0	2019–	(Mexico) Cruz Azul	
Liliana Godoy			2011	Retired	
Natalia Gómez Junco	5	0	2013–2018	Retired	
Elizabeth Gómez			2002–2007	Retired	
Alison González	10	3	2021–	(Mexico) UANL	
**Itzel González**	20	0	2019–	(Mexico) UANL	
Mónica González	83	10	1998–2011	Retired	
Anisa Guajardo	13	4	2011–2015	Retired	
Nancy Gutiérrez			2004	Retired	
Bianca Henninger	7	0	2017–2019	Retired	
Montserrat Hernández	3	0	2021–	(Mexico) Guadalajara	
**Nicolette Hernández**	21	1	2022–	(Mexico) América	
Zulma Hernández	1	0	2019–	Unattached	
Laurie Hill				Retired	
Sofía Huerta (Note: Later represented the United States.)	5	2	2012–2013	(France) Lyon	
Fabiola Ibarra	6	1	2013–	(Mexico) Pachuca	
Denise Ireta	3	0		Retired	
Adriana Iturbide	6	1	2019–	(Mexico) Guadalajara	
Carolina Jaramillo	5	2	2017–	(Mexico) Guadalajara	
Mariela Jiménez	1	0	2020	Retired	
Anjulí Ladrón			2015	Retired	
Brenda León	1	0	2020-	Unattached	
Fátima Leyva	62	5	2000–2011	Retired	
Evelyn López	102	14	2004–2011	Retired	
**Jimena López**	36	3	2019–	(Mexico) UANL	
Ana Lozada	1	0	2020–	Retired	
**Karen Luna**	12	2	2024–	(Mexico) América	
Maria Maradiaga	1	1	2006	Retired	
Carina Maravillas			2004	Retired	
Alma Martínez	9	1	2004	Retired	
**Karla Martínez**	3	0	2023–	(Mexico) Guadalajara	
**Katty Martínez**	21	8	2019–	(Mexico) Monterrey	
**Natalia Mauleón**	12	2	2022–	(Mexico) América	
Stephany Mayor	92	21	2010-	(Mexico) UANL	
**Annia Mejía**	4	0	2016–	(Mexico) Juárez	
**Ana Mendoza**	1	0	2024–	(Mexico) UNAM	
Liliana Mercado	24	1	2010-	(Mexico) Juárez	
Kendyl Michner			1998–1999	Retired	
Valeria Miranda	17	0	2015–	(Mexico) Cruz Azul	
Jennifer Molina				Retired	
Daniela Monroy	2	0	2022-	Retired	
Desirée Monsiváis	5	3	2013-2015	Retired	
Casandra Montero	1	1	2021-	(Mexico) Monterrey	
Joseline Montoya	6	1	2021-	(Mexico) UANL	
Martha Moore	2	0	1999–2002	Retired	
Iris Mora	13	2	1999–2006	Retired	
Susana Mora	3	0	1998–2003	Retired	
Tania Morales	8	2	2005–2018	Retired	
Andrea Moreno	1	1	2003	Retired	
Jennifer Muñoz	1	1	2020	Retired	
Leslie Muñoz			2003-2010	Retired	
Christina Murillo	26	1	2011–2018	Retired	
Lisa Náñez	3	0		Retired	
**Karla Nieto**	55	1	2015–	(Mexico) Juárez	
Teresa Noyola	40	3	2010-2018	(United States) Oakland Soul	
Gina Oceguera			1998-2002	Retired	
Mónica Ocampo	77	14	2006-	(Mexico) Pachuca	
**Diana Ordóñez**	29	10	2022–	(United States) Houston Dash	
**Jocelyn Orejel**	22	0	2018–	(Mexico) América	
**Lizbeth Ovalle**	58	20	2018–	(Mexico) UANL	
**Kiana Palacios**	50	13	2018–	(Mexico) UANL	
**Mayra Pelayo-Bernal**	13	2	2023–	(Mexico) UANL	
Amanda Pérez	8	0	2013-2020	(Mexico) Pachuca	
**Nicole Pérez**	14	4	2021–	(Mexico) Monterrey	
Patricia Pérez				Retired	
Verónica Pérez	84	9	2010-2016	Retired	
Nancy Pinzón				Retired	
Linnea Quiñones	3	0		Retired	
Nayeli Rangel	81	7	2012-	(Mexico) UANL	
**Maricarmen Reyes**	13	7	2021–	(Mexico) UANL	
**Reyna Reyes**	14	0	2021–	(United States) Portland Thorns	
Clarissa Robles	1	0	2017-2018	Retired	
Joana Robles	14	0	2019-	(Mexico) Atlético San Luis	
**Kenti Robles**	106	3	2010–	(Mexico) Pachuca	
Andrea Rodebaugh	3	0	1994-1999	Retired	
**Anika Rodríguez**	18	0	2021–	(Mexico) UANL	
**Karina Rodríguez**	20	0	2021–	(Mexico) América	
**Kimberly Rodríguez**	25	1	2019–	(Mexico) América	
Arianna Romero	47	1	2011-2018	Retired	
Mayra Rosales	2	2	2003	Retired	
Tánima Rubalcaba				Retired	
Jenny Ruiz	36	4	2003-2016	Retired	
**Montserrat Saldívar**	4	2	2024–	(Mexico) América	
Viridiana Salazar	3	0	2020-	(Mexico) Guadalajara	
Tanya Samarzich	10	1	2011–2017	Retired	
**María Sánchez**	63	14	2015–	(United States) San Diego Wave	
Marlene Sandoval	85	5	2002-2011	Retired	
Cecilia Santiago	66	0	2010-	(Mexico) UANL	
Luz Saucedo	106	2	2003-2011	Retired	
**Fátima Servín**	4	1	2024–	(Mexico) Monterrey	
Bianca Sierra	76	0	2013-2022	(Mexico) UANL	
Paulina Solís	7	0	2013–2014	Retired	
**Alice Soto**	4	3	2024–	(Mexico) Monterrey	
Pamela Tajonar	58	0	2002-	Monterrey	
**Araceli Torres**	11	0	2023–	(Mexico) Guadalajara	
Dioselina Valderrama			2004	Retired	
Maria Valdez	1	1	2007	Retired	
Yvette Valdez			1998-1999	Retired	
Erika Vanegas			2010-2011	Retired	
Esmeralda Verdugo	1	0	2015	(Mexico) Tijuana	
Mónica Vergara				Retired	
Leticia Villalpando	1	1	2005	Retired	
Melany Villeda	1	0	2021-	(Mexico) UNAM	
Natalie Vinti	22	0	2010-2011	Retired	
Lupita Worbis	115	20	2003-2013	Retired	
Miah Zuazua	3	0	2023-	(Mexico) Juárez	

== See also ==
- Mexico women's national football team
