= Football at the 1998 Goodwill Games – Women's team squads =

The women's football tournament at the 1998 Goodwill Games was held from 25 to 27 July 1998. The four national teams involved in the tournament were required to register a squad of players, including two goalkeepers.

The age listed for each player is their age as of 25 July 1998, the first day of the tournament. The numbers of caps and goals listed for each player do not include any matches played after the start of the tournament. The club listed is the club for which the player last played a competitive match prior to the tournament.

== China PR ==
Manager: Ma Yuanan

China PR named a 19-player squad for the tournament.

| No. | Pos. | Player | Date of birth (age) | Caps | Goals | Club |
|---|---|---|---|---|---|---|
| 1 | GK | Zhao Yan | 7 May 1972 (aged 26) | | | (Chinese Football Association) Shanghai |
| 2 | MF | Wang Liping | 12 November 1973 (aged 24) | | | (Chinese Football Association) Hebei |
| 3 | DF | Fan Yunjie | 29 April 1972 (aged 26) | | | (Chinese Football Association) Henan |
| 4 | DF | Man Yanling | 9 November 1972 (aged 25) | | | (Chinese Football Association) Beijing |
| 5 | MF | Xie Huilin | 17 January 1975 (aged 23) | | | (Chinese Football Association) Shanghai |
| 6 | MF | Zhao Lihong | 4 December 1972 (aged 25) | | | (Chinese Football Association) Guangdong |
| 7 | FW | Zhang Ouying | 2 November 1975 (aged 22) | | | (Chinese Football Association) Hebei |
| 8 | FW | Jin Yan | 27 July 1972 (aged 25) | | | (Chinese Football Association) Beijing |
| 9 | FW | Sun Wen (captain) | 6 April 1973 (aged 25) | | | (Chinese Football Association) Shanghai |
| 10 | MF | Liu Ailing | 2 June 1967 (aged 31) | | | (Chinese Football Association) Beijing |
| 12 | DF | Bai Jie | 28 March 1972 (aged 26) | | | (Chinese Football Association) Army |
| 13 | MF | Liu Ying | 11 June 1974 (aged 24) | | | (Chinese Football Association) Beijing |
| 15 | DF | Wang Jingxia | 11 November 1976 (aged 21) | | | (Chinese Football Association) Shanghai |
| 16 | MF | Qiu Haiyan | 17 June 1974 (aged 24) | | | (Chinese Football Association) Guangdong |
| 17 | MF | Xie Caixia | 17 February 1976 (aged 22) | | | (Chinese Football Association) Guangdong |
| 18 | MF | Zhu Jing | 2 March 1978 (aged 20) | | | (Chinese Football Association) Shandong |
| 19 | | He Xingxue | | | | (Chinese Football Association) Guangdong |
| 20 | GK | Gao Hong | 27 November 1967 (aged 30) | | | (Chinese Football Association) Guangdong |
| | | Mo Chenyue | | | | (Chinese Football Association) Shanghai |

== Denmark ==
Manager: Jørgen Hvidemose

Denmark named an 18-player squad for the tournament.

| No. | Pos. | Player | Date of birth (age) | Caps | Goals | Club |
|---|---|---|---|---|---|---|
| 1 | GK | Dorthe Larsen | 8 August 1969 (aged 28) | 50 | 0 | (Danish Football Association) Fortuna Hjørring |
| 2 | DF | Lene Terp (captain) | 15 April 1973 (aged 25) | 47 | 2 | (Danish Football Association) OB |
| 3 | MF | Katrine Pedersen | 13 April 1977 (aged 21) | 36 | 1 | (Danish Football Association) HEI |
| 4 | MF | Jeanne Axelsen | 3 January 1968 (aged 30) | 22 | 3 | (Danish Football Association) Rødovre |
| 5 | DF | Hanne Sand Christensen | 22 September 1973 (aged 24) | 16 | 0 | (Danish Football Association) Fortuna Hjørring |
| 6 | MF | Birgit Christensen | 31 May 1976 (aged 22) | 42 | 8 | (Danish Football Association) Fortuna Hjørring |
| 7 | MF | Louise Hansen | 4 May 1975 (aged 23) | 20 | 0 | (German Football Association) TSV Siegen |
| 8 | FW | Merete Pedersen | 30 June 1973 (aged 25) | 29 | 5 | (Danish Football Association) OB |
| 9 | FW | Gitte Krogh | 13 May 1977 (aged 21) | 52 | 23 | (Danish Football Association) OB |
| 10 | MF | Anne Dot Eggers Nielsen | 6 November 1975 (aged 22) | 53 | 10 | (Danish Football Association) HEI |
| 11 | MF | Christina Petersen | 17 September 1974 (aged 23) | 42 | 8 | (Danish Football Association) Fortuna Hjørring |
| 12 | MF | Janne Rasmussen | 18 July 1970 (aged 28) | 27 | 8 | (Danish Football Association) OB |
| 13 | DF | Karina Christensen | 1 July 1973 (aged 25) | 4 | 1 | (Danish Football Association) Rødovre |
| 14 | DF | Marlene Kristensen | 28 May 1973 (aged 25) | 5 | 0 | (Danish Football Association) OB |
| 15 | FW | Lene Jensen | 17 March 1976 (aged 22) | 10 | 1 | (Danish Football Association) HEI |
| 16 | GK | Christina Jensen | 21 January 1974 (aged 24) | 7 | 0 | (Danish Football Association) OB |
| 17 | DF | Lise Søndergaard | 27 October 1973 (aged 24) | 0 | 0 | (Danish Football Association) HEI |
| 18 | MF | Janni Johansen | 14 January 1976 (aged 22) | 10 | 1 | (German Football Association) TSV Siegen |

== Norway ==
Manager: Per-Mathias Høgmo

Norway named a 17-player squad for the tournament.

| No. | Pos. | Player | Date of birth (age) | Caps | Goals | Club |
|---|---|---|---|---|---|---|
| 1 | GK | Bente Nordby | 23 July 1974 (aged 24) | 61 | 0 | (Norwegian Football Federation) Athene Moss |
| 2 | DF | Brit Sandaune | 5 June 1972 (aged 26) | 36 | 6 | (Norwegian Football Federation) Trondheims-Ørn |
| 3 | DF | Gøril Kringen | 28 January 1972 (aged 26) | 24 | 0 | (Norwegian Football Federation) Trondheims-Ørn |
| 4 | FW | Linda Medalen (captain) | 17 June 1965 (aged 33) | 136 | 61 | (Norwegian Football Federation) Asker |
| 6 | MF | Hege Riise | 18 July 1969 (aged 29) | 105 | 43 | (Norwegian Football Federation) Setskog/Høland |
| 7 | MF | Unni Lehn | 7 June 1977 (aged 21) | 23 | 5 | (Norwegian Football Federation) Trondheims-Ørn |
| 8 | MF | Monica Knudsen | 25 March 1975 (aged 23) | 23 | 3 | (Norwegian Football Federation) Asker |
| 9 | MF | Margunn Haugenes | 25 January 1970 (aged 28) | 48 | 8 | (Norwegian Football Federation) Arna-Bjørnar |
| 10 | MF | Kjersti Thun | 18 June 1974 (aged 24) | 8 | 1 | (Norwegian Football Federation) Asker |
| 11 | FW | Marianne Pettersen | 12 April 1975 (aged 23) | 57 | 42 | (Norwegian Football Federation) Asker |
| 12 | GK | Ingeborg Hovland | 3 October 1969 (aged 28) | 2 | 0 | (Norwegian Football Federation) Klepp |
| 13 | DF | Henriette Viker | 5 August 1973 (aged 24) | 17 | 0 | (Norwegian Football Federation) Asker |
| 14 | MF | Silje Jørgensen | 5 May 1977 (aged 21) | 8 | 1 | (Norwegian Football Federation) Klepp |
| 15 | FW | Elisabeth Fagereng | 17 April 1976 (aged 22) | 11 | 0 | (Norwegian Football Federation) Kolbotn |
| 16 | DF | Anne Tønnessen | 18 March 1974 (aged 24) | 6 | 0 | (Norwegian Football Federation) Kolbotn |
| 17 | MF | Solveig Gulbrandsen | 12 January 1981 (aged 17) | 1 | 0 | (Norwegian Football Federation) Kolbotn |
| 18 | FW | Ragnhild Gulbrandsen | 22 February 1977 (aged 21) | 13 | 4 | (Norwegian Football Federation) Trondheims-Ørn |

== United States ==
Manager: Tony DiCicco

The United States named an 18-player squad for the tournament.

| No. | Pos. | Player | Date of birth (age) | Caps | Goals | Club |
|---|---|---|---|---|---|---|
| | GK | Tracy Ducar | 18 June 1973 (aged 25) | 18 | 0 | (United States Soccer Federation) Raleigh Wings |
| | GK | Briana Scurry | 7 September 1971 (aged 26) | 75 | 0 | |
| | DF | Lorrie Fair | 5 August 1978 (aged 19) | 32 | 1 | (United States Soccer Federation) North Carolina Tar Heels |
| | DF | Carla Overbeck (captain) | 9 May 1968 (aged 30) | 123 | 7 | |
| | DF | Christie Pearce | 24 June 1975 (aged 23) | 31 | 2 | (United States Soccer Federation) New Jersey Lady Stallions |
| | DF | Kate Sobrero | 23 August 1976 (aged 21) | 6 | 0 | |
| | MF | Michelle Akers | 1 February 1966 (aged 32) | 122 | 98 | |
| | MF | Brandi Chastain | 21 July 1968 (aged 30) | 72 | 16 | |
| | MF | Joy Fawcett | 8 February 1968 (aged 30) | 121 | 15 | (United States Soccer Federation) Ajax America Women |
| | MF | Julie Foudy | 23 January 1971 (aged 27) | 133 | 23 | (United States Soccer Federation) Sacramento Storm |
| | MF | Shannon MacMillan | 7 October 1974 (aged 23) | 57 | 13 | |
| | MF | Cindy Parlow | 8 May 1978 (aged 20) | 40 | 17 | (United States Soccer Federation) North Carolina Tar Heels |
| | MF | Tiffany Roberts | 5 May 1977 (aged 21) | 70 | 6 | (United States Soccer Federation) North Carolina Tar Heels |
| | MF | Tisha Venturini | 3 March 1973 (aged 25) | 107 | 40 | (United States Soccer Federation) Delaware Genies |
| | FW | Mia Hamm | 17 March 1972 (aged 26) | 151 | 92 | |
| | FW | Debbie Keller | 24 March 1975 (aged 23) | 39 | 13 | |
| | FW | Kristine Lilly | 22 July 1971 (aged 27) | 158 | 58 | (United States Soccer Federation) Delaware Genies |
| | FW | Tiffeny Milbrett | 23 October 1972 (aged 25) | 97 | 41 | |
