= Football at the 1998 Asian Games =

- Venues: Nakhon Sawan Stadium; Surat Thani Stadium; Supachalasai Stadium; Trang Stadium; Suphan Buri Stadium; 700th Anniversary Stadium; Sri Nakhon Lamduan Stadium; Tinsulanon Stadium; Thammasat Stadium; Rajamangala Stadium; Thupatemi Stadium; Thai-Japanese Stadium
- Dates: 30 November – 19 December
- Nations: 24

Medalists
gold medal	Iran (men); China (women)
silver medal	Kuwait (men); North Korea (women)
bronze medal	China (men); Japan (women)

Football at the 1998 Asian Games was held in Thailand from 30 November to 19 December 1998. 24 countries participated in the football competition.

Iran won the men's gold medal with the skeleton of the team that played in the 1998 FIFA World Cup in France with addition of some new players. Iran won the goal medal defeating Kuwait in the final 2–0. China beat the host team Thailand 3–0 in the bronze medal match to finish third.

China won the women's competition after beating North Korea 1–0 after the extra time.

== Venues ==
Bangkok			Chiang Mai	Pathum Thani	
Rajamangala Stadium	Supachalasai Stadium	Thai-Japanese Stadium	700th Anniversary Stadium	Thupatemi Stadium	Thammasat Stadium
Capacity: 80,000	Capacity: 40,000	Capacity: 6,600	Capacity: 25,000	Capacity: 25,000	Capacity: 25,000
Suphanburi	Songkhla	Nakhon Sawan	Sisaket	Surat Thani	Trang
Suphanburi Stadium	Tinsulanon Stadium	Nakhon Sawan Stadium	Sri Nakhon Lamduan Stadium	Surat Thani Stadium	Trang Municipality Stadium
Capacity: 20,000	Capacity: 20,000	Capacity: 15,000	Capacity: 11,200	Capacity: 10,000	Capacity: 4,789
Football at the 1998 Asian Games is located in Thailand

== Schedule ==
P	Preliminary round	S	Second round	¼	Quarterfinals	½	Semifinals	F	Finals

Event↓/Date →	30th Mon	1st Tue	2nd Wed	3rd Thu	4th Fri	5th Sat	6th Sun	7th Mon	8th Tue	9th Wed	10th Thu	11th Fri	12th Sat	13th Sun	14th Mon	15th Tue	16th Wed	17th Thu	18th Fri	19th Sat
Men	P	P	P	P	P	P		S	S	S	S	S	S		¼		½			F
Women								P	P	P	P	P	P			½		F		

== Medalists ==
Event	Gold	Silver	Bronze
Men	Iran; Behzad Gholampour; Mehdi Mahdavikia; Javad Zarincheh; Mohammad Khakpour; Nader Mohammadkhani; Karim Bagheri; Alireza Mansourian; Sattar Hamedani; Hamid Estili; Ali Daei; Ali Mousavi; Dariush Yazdani; Mohammad Navazi; Vahid Hashemian; Ali Karimi; Ali Janmaleki; Rasoul Khatibi; Mahmoud Fekri; Nima Nakisa; Hamid Reza Babaei	Kuwait; Khaled Al-Fadhli; Naser Al-Omran; Jamal Mubarak; Ali Abdulreda Asel; Nohair Al-Shammari; Hussain Al-Khodari; Bader Haji; Mohammad Al-Buraiki; Ayman Al-Hussaini; Hani Al-Saqer; Faraj Laheeb; Nawaf Al-Khaldi; Ahmad Al-Mutairi; Khaled Abdulqoddus; Saleh Al-Buraiki; Mohammad Jasem; Esam Sakeen; Naser Al-Othman; Jasem Al-Huwaidi; Ahmad Al-Jasem	China; Jiang Jin; Ma Yongkang; Zhang Enhua; Sun Jihai; Fan Zhiyi; Li Tie; Zhao Junzhe; Ma Mingyu; Hao Haidong; Yang Chen; Bian Jun; Sui Dongliang; Wang Peng; Shu Chang; Huang Yong; Yao Xia; Li Weifeng; Li Jinyu; Chen Dong; Chi Rongliang
Women	China; Bai Jie; Fan Yunjie; Gao Hong; Jin Yan; Liu Ailing; Liu Ying; Man Yanling; Qiu Haiyan; Shui Qingxia; Sun Qimin; Sun Wen; Wang Jingxia; Wang Liping; Wen Lirong; Xie Huilin; Zhang Ouying; Zhao Lihong; Zhao Yan	North Korea; Jin Pyol-hui; Jo Jong-ran; Jo Song-ok; Kim Hye-ran; Kim Kum-sil; Kim Song-ryo; Kim Sun-hui; Kim Sun-hye; Kye Yong-sun; Pak Jong-ae; Ri Ae-gyong; Ri Hyang-ok; Ri Jong-hui; Ri Kum-suk; Ri Kyong-ae; Sol Yong-suk; Yang Kyong-hui; Yun In-sil	Japan; Mito Isaka; Hiromi Isozaki; Kazumi Kishi; Tomomi Mitsui; Mai Nakachi; Kae Nishina; Yumi Obe; Shiho Onodera; Nami Otake; Tomoe Sakai; Homare Sawa; Miki Sugawara; Yumi Tomei; Tamaki Uchiyama; Yasuyo Yamagishi; Nozomi Yamago; Rie Yamaki; Miyuki Yanagita

== Medal table ==
Rank	Nation	Gold	Silver	Bronze	Total
1	China (CHN)	1	0	1	2
2	Iran (IRI)	1	0	0	1
3	Kuwait (KUW)	0	1	0	1
3	North Korea (PRK)	0	1	0	1
5	Japan (JPN)	0	0	1	1
Totals (5 entries)		2	2	2	6

== Draw ==
=== Men ===
Group A

- Turkmenistan
- Vietnam
- South Korea

Group B

- China
- Lebanon
- Cambodia

Group C

- Nepal
- Japan
- India

Group D

- Tajikistan
- Maldives
- Qatar
- ~~Brunei~~*

Group E

- North Korea
- ~~Myanmar~~*
- United Arab Emirates
- ~~Bangladesh~~*

Group F

- Hong Kong
- Oman
- Thailand

Group G

- Uzbekistan
- Mongolia
- Kuwait

Group H

- Kazakhstan
- Iran
- Laos

* Withdrew

=== Women ===
Group A

- Thailand
- Japan
- North Korea
- Vietnam

Group B

- China
- South Korea
- Chinese Taipei
- India

== Final standing ==
=== Men ===
Rank	Team	Pld	W	D	L	GF	GA	GD	Pts
1st place, gold medalist(s)	Iran	8	7	0	1	24	6	+18	21
2nd place, silver medalist(s)	Kuwait	8	3	2	3	23	8	+15	11
3rd place, bronze medalist(s)	China	8	6	0	2	24	7	+17	18
4	Thailand	8	4	1	3	12	10	+2	13
5	Qatar	6	4	1	1	9	4	+5	13
6	South Korea	6	4	0	2	12	6	+6	12
7	Uzbekistan	6	3	2	1	25	8	+17	11
8	Turkmenistan	6	3	2	1	10	9	+1	11
9	Japan	5	3	0	2	8	4	+4	9
10	Kazakhstan	5	2	1	2	8	6	+2	7
11	Oman	5	2	1	2	14	13	+1	7
12	Lebanon	5	2	0	3	9	7	+2	6
13	North Korea	4	1	2	1	6	8	−2	5
14	Tajikistan	5	1	1	3	8	13	−5	4
15	United Arab Emirates	4	1	1	2	5	10	−5	4
16	India	5	1	0	4	3	8	−5	3
17	Nepal	2	0	0	2	0	6	−6	0
17	Vietnam	2	0	0	2	0	6	−6	0
19	Cambodia	2	0	0	2	2	9	−7	0
20	Maldives	2	0	0	2	0	7	−7	0
21	Laos	2	0	0	2	1	11	−10	0
22	Hong Kong	2	0	0	2	0	11	−11	0
23	Mongolia	2	0	0	2	0	26	−26	0

=== Women ===
Rank	Team	Pld	W	D	L	GF	GA	GD	Pts
1st place, gold medalist(s)	China	5	5	0	0	28	0	+28	15
2nd place, silver medalist(s)	North Korea	5	3	1	1	26	4	+22	10
3rd place, bronze medalist(s)	Japan	5	3	0	2	18	7	+11	9
4	Chinese Taipei	5	1	2	2	16	10	+6	5
5	South Korea	3	1	1	1	8	4	+4	4
6	Vietnam	3	0	1	2	1	16	−15	1
7	Thailand	3	0	1	2	1	22	−21	1
8	India	3	0	0	3	1	36	−35	0
