= Mary Bowie =

Mary Bowie may refer to:

- Mary Jane Bowie (born 1948), Canadian luger
- Mary Beth Bowie (born 1978), Canadian soccer player
