= Marchio =

Marchio is an Italian surname. Notable people with the surname include:

- Fanny Marchiò (1904–1980), Italian actress
- Luisa Marchio (born 1971), Italian footballer

== See also ==
- Francesco Maria Taliani de Marchio (1887-1968), Italian diplomat, and ambassador to China
