= Clottey =

Clottey is a surname. Notable people with the surname include:

- Emmanuel Clottey (born 1987), Ghanaian footballer
- Emmanuel Clottey (boxer), (born 1974), Ghanaian boxer
- Genevive Clottey (born 1969), Ghanaian footballer
- Joshua Clottey (born 1977), Ghanaian boxer
- Serge Attukwei Clottey (born 1985), Ghanaian artist

== See also ==
- Manny Pacquiao vs. Joshua Clottey, was a welterweight fight for the WBO World welterweight championship
