= Madleen =

Madleen is a given name. Notable people with the given name include:

- Madleen Kane (born 1958), Swedish model and singer
- Madleen Wilder (born 1980), German footballer

== See also ==
- Madeleine (given name), another given name
- June 2025 Gaza Freedom Flotilla, led by a ship named Madleen
