= Guadalupe Cruzaley =

Mexican footballer (born 1986)

Personal information
- Full name: María Guadalupe Cruzaley Parra
- Date of birth: 12 October 1986 (age 40)
- Place of birth: Michoacán, Mexico
- Height: 1.60 m (5 ft 3 in)
- Position: Defender

Senior career*
Years	Team	Apps	(Gls)
2018–2020	Morelia	57	(10)

International career^{‡}
2015	Mexico	1+	(0)
- * Club domestic league appearances and goals as of 2 March 2020 ‡ National team caps and goals as of 13 December 2015

María Guadalupe Cruzaley Parra (born 10 December 1986), is a former Mexican footballer who last played as a defender for Liga MX Femenil club Monarcas Morelia. She has been a member of the Mexico women's national team.

== International career ==
Cruzaley capped for Mexico at senior level in the 2015 International Women's Football Tournament of Natal.

== See also ==
- List of Mexico women's international footballers
