= Marilou Duringer =

French association football player

Personal information
- Date of birth: 1 September 1948 (age 78)
- Position: Midfielder

Senior career*
Years	Team	Apps	(Gls)
- FC Vendenheim
- * Club domestic league appearances and goals

Marilou Duringer, (born September 1, 1948), is a French footballer who played for FC Vendenheim. After retiring from football she became an administrator for the French Football Federation. Duringer is an important pioneer of Women's football in France.
