= Elena Kononova =

Russian footballer (1969–2014)

Elena Kononova (Russian: Елена Викторовна Кононова; Moscow, 17 August 1969 – 22 May 2014) was a Russian soccer player.

With the Russian national team, she participated in the UEFA Women's Championship in 1993, 1995 and 1997.

== See also ==
1997 UEFA Women's Championship squads
