= Alessandra Pallotti =

Italian footballer (born 1974)

Personal information
- Date of birth: 7 September 1974 (age 52)
- Position: Midfielder

International career^{‡}
Years	Team	Apps	(Gls)
- Italy
- ‡ National team caps and goals as of 19 June 1999 (before the 1999 FIFA Women's World Cup)

Alessandra Pallotti (born 7 September 1974) is an Italian footballer who played as a midfielder for the Italy women's national football team. She was part of the team at the 1999 FIFA Women's World Cup.
