= Roberta Stefanelli =

Italian footballer

Personal information
- Date of birth: 18 May 1974 (age 52)
- Position: Defender

International career^{‡}
Years	Team	Apps	(Gls)
- Italy
- ‡ National team caps and goals as of 19 June 1999 (before the 1999 FIFA Women's World Cup)

Roberta Stefanelli (born 18 May 1974) is an Italian footballer who played as a defender for the Italy women's national football team. She was part of the team at the 1999 FIFA Women's World Cup.
