= Teresina Marsico =

Italian association football player

Personal information
- Date of birth: 7 February 1976 (age 50)
- Place of birth: San Mango d'Aquino, Italy
- Position: Centre forward

Senior career*
Years	Team	Apps	(Gls)
- ACF Milan

International career
	Italy	5	(0)
- * Club domestic league appearances and goals

Teresina Marsico (born 7 February 1976) is an Italian former footballer who played as a centre forward for Lazio.

== Bibliography ==
- Luca Barboni and Gabriele Cecchi, Annuario del calcio femminile 2002/2003, Agnano Pisano (PI), Etruria Football Club - Stamperia Editoriale Pisana S.r.l., luglio 2003.
- Salvatore Lo Presti, Almanacco del calcio mondiale 2004-05, Torino, S.E.T., 2004.
- Sergio Nunzio Capizzi e Roberto Quartarone, Il cielo è rosa sopra il Cibali, Catania, Quelli del '46, 2020, ISBN 9798638618735.
- Roberto Quartarone e Sergio Nunzio Capizzi, Calcio femminile Gravina, la Stella del Sud, Catania, Quelli del '46, 2021, ISBN 9798475012772.
