= Priscila (footballer, born 1982) =

Brazilian footballer

Personal information
- Full name: Priscila Faria de Oliveira
- Date of birth: 10 March 1982 (age 44)
- Position: Midfielder

International career^{‡}
Years	Team	Apps	(Gls)
	Brazil	3	(0)
- ‡ National team caps and goals as of 29 September 2003

Priscila Faria de Oliveira (born 10 March 1982) is a Brazilian women's international footballer who plays as a midfielder. She is a member of the Brazil women's national football team. She was part of the team at the 1999 FIFA Women's World Cup and 2003 FIFA Women's World Cup.
