= Jessika Sundh =

Swedish footballer

Personal information
- Date of birth: 9 July 1974 (age 52)
- Position: Defender

International career
Years	Team	Apps	(Gls)
	Sweden	2	(0)

Jessika Sundh (born 9 July 1974) is a Swedish women's international footballer who plays as a defender. She is a member of the Sweden women's national football team. She was part of the team at the 1999 FIFA Women's World Cup.
