= Sandrine Roux =

French footballer (born 1966)

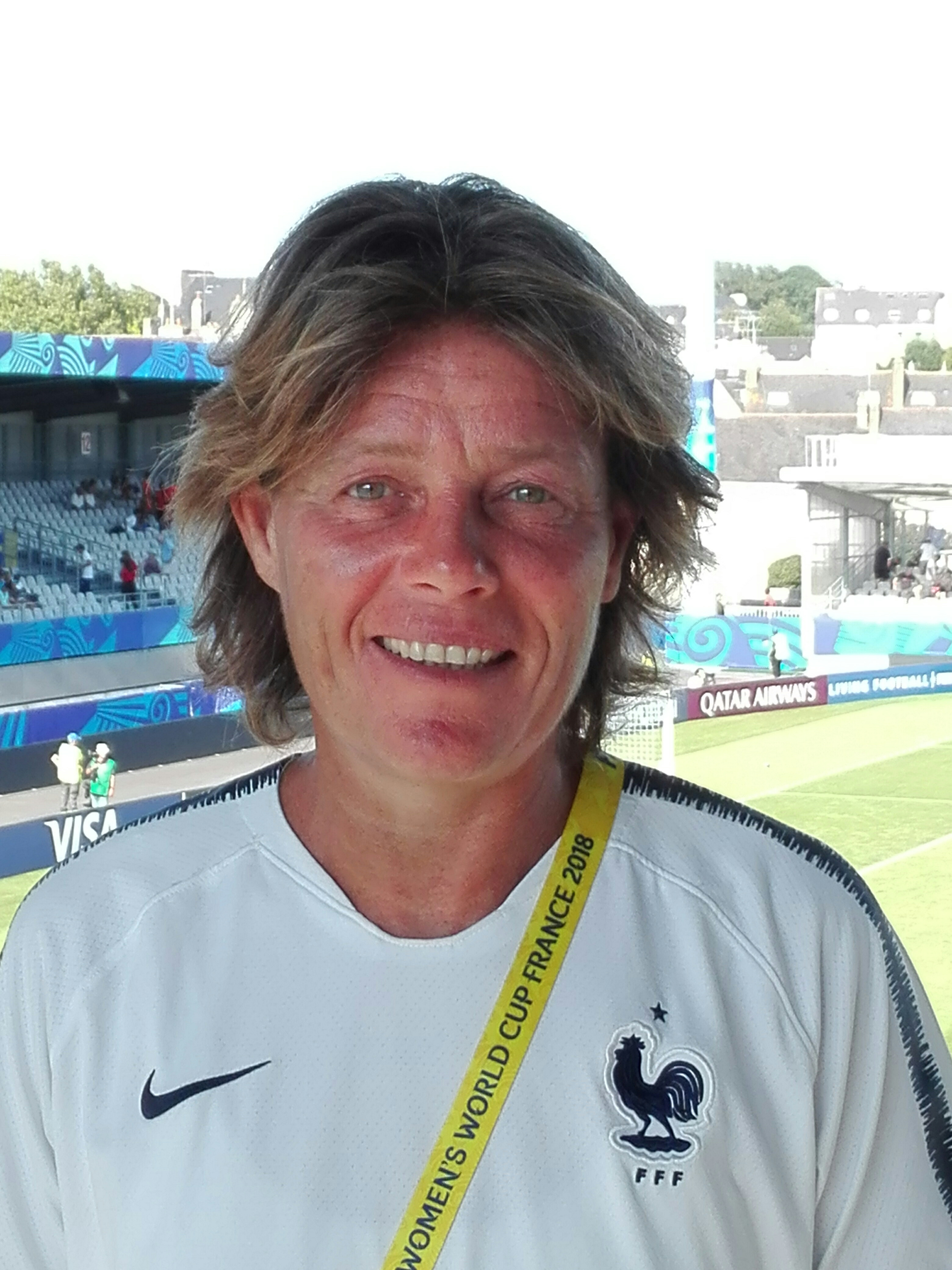
- Roux in 2018

Personal information
- Date of birth: 22 December 1966 (age 59)
- Place of birth: Montreuil, Paris, France
- Position: Goalkeeper

Senior career*
Years	Team	Apps	(Gls)
1980–1999	VGA Saint-Maur	?	(?)
1999–2001	Lyon	?	(?)

International career^{‡}
1983–2000	France	71	(0)
- * Club domestic league appearances and goals as of 18:13, 17 February 2021 (UTC) ‡ National team caps and goals as of 18:13, 17 February 2021 (UTC)

Sandrine Roux (born 22 December 1966) is a French former footballer, who played for the national team between 1983 and 2000. At club level, she played for VGA Saint-Maur and Olympique Lyonnais Féminin. Roux played as a goalkeeper.

== Personal life ==
Roux was born in Montreuil, a suburb of Paris. She started playing football in 1974, during which time she had to hide her long hair under a cap. As a youngstar, she played at Paris FC, which at the time only had a men's team, under the name Stéphane, as women were not allowed to play in the men's team.

== Career ==
Roux started her career playing for VGA Saint-Maur. She played for VGA Saint-Maur from 1980 until 1999, and won Division 1 Féminine titles with them in 1983, 1985, 1986, 1987, 1988, and 1990. She later played for Olympique Lyonnais Féminin, from 1999 until 2001.

Roux made her debut for France in 1983. She competed at the UEFA Women's Euro 1997, and played internationally until 2000. She made 71 appearances for the national team.

Roux retired from football in 2001. In the same year, she became goalkeeping coach for France U-17. She later worked as an assistant coach for France U-20 at the 2016 FIFA U-20 Women's World Cup.

In 2019, Roux worked as a commentator for the Canal+ coverage of the 2019 FIFA Women's World Cup.
