= Kulu Yahaya =

Ghanaian footballer

Kulu Yahaya-Jawula
Personal information
- Full name: Kulu Yahaya-Jawula
- Date of birth: 23 May 1976 (age 50)
- Place of birth: Ghana
- Position: Defender

Senior career*
Years	Team	Apps	(Gls)
1998–2002	Ashaiman Ladies		

International career
1998–2003	Ghana		
- * Club domestic league appearances and goals

Kulu Yahaya-Jawula (born 23 May 1976) is a Ghanaian former international footballer who played as a defender. She represented the Ghana women's national football team at multiple major international tournaments, including serving as a rostered squad member for the 1999 FIFA Women's World Cup and the 1998 African Women's Championship.

== Club career ==
At the domestic level, Yahaya-Jawula played for the Ashaiman Ladies in Ghana. Following her international achievements, she maintained ties to her former club, donating equipment and kits to support the development of local youth players.

== International career ==
Yahaya-Jawula rose through the national team ranks to become a consistent presence in the Black Queens defense during their breakout era in the late 1990s. She was named to the final roster for the 1998 African Women's Championship, where Ghana finished as runners-up to Nigeria and secured their historic first-ever qualification for the World Cup.

She was subsequently selected by head coach Emmanuel Kwasi Afranie as part of the final 20-player squad for the 1999 FIFA Women's World Cup in the United States. Following the tournament, she continued her national team service into the early 2000s, participating in qualification camps and preparation matches for the 2000 African Women's Championship and subsequent international cycles.

In June 2013, Yahaya-Jawula and her teammates from the historic 1998–1999 Black Queens squad were collectively honored at the Guinness National Player Awards in Accra. The team received the "Old Generation" award in recognition of their pioneering achievements and for securing the nation's debut appearance at a FIFA tournament.

== College career and post-football ==
Following her international career, Yahaya-Jawula migrated to the United States on an athletic scholarship to play collegiate soccer at Robert Morris University (RMU) in Chicago. Competing in the NAIA, she was widely recognized as one of the top defenders in the country, earning NAIA All-American honors.

She also excelled academically, earning ESPN The Magazine / CoSIDA Academic All-American recognition in 2004. For her contributions to the program, she was later inducted into the RMU Athletic Hall of Fame. After graduating with a degree in Business Administration, she transitioned into a corporate finance career in the United States.
