= Bárbara Almaraz =

Mexican footballer (born 1979)

Personal information
- Full name: Bárbara Marie Almaraz Preciado
- Date of birth: 4 May 1979 (age 47)
- Place of birth: Oxnard, California, United States
- Positions: Midfielder; defender

College career
Years	Team	Apps	(Gls)
1999–2000	USC Trojans	13	(0)

International career^{‡}
- Mexico
- ‡ National team caps and goals as of 19 June 1999 (before the 1999 FIFA Women's World Cup)

Bárbara Marie Almaraz Preciado (born 4 May 1979) is an American-born Mexican former women's international footballer who played as a defender. She was a member of the Mexico women's national football team. She was part of the team at the 1999 FIFA Women's World Cup.

== See also ==
- List of Mexico women's international footballers
