= Patience Sackey =

Ghanaian footballer

Personal information
- Date of birth: 22 April 1975 (age 51)
- Position: Defender

International career^{‡}
Years	Team	Apps	(Gls)
	Ghana	6	(0)
- ‡ National team caps and goals as of 29 September 2003

Patience Sackey (born 22 April 1975) is a Ghanaian women's international footballer who plays as a defender. She is a member of the Ghana women's national football team. She was part of the team at the 1999 FIFA Women's World Cup and 2003 FIFA Women's World Cup.
