= Juliana Kakraba =

Ghanaian footballer

Personal information
- Date of birth: 29 December 1979 (age 46)
- Position: Midfielder

Senior career*
| Years | Team | Apps | (Gls) |
- Ghatel Ladies

International career
- Ghana
- * Club domestic league appearances and goals

Juliana Kakraba (born 29 December 1979) is a Ghanaian former footballer who played as a midfielder. She represented the Ghana women's national football team and participated in international competitions, including the 1999 FIFA Women's World Cup.

== Career ==
During her club football career, she played for Ghatel Ladies in Ghana.

Kakraba was a member of the Ghana women's national football team. She was included in the team's squad for the 1999 FIFA Women's World Cup in the United States.
