= Jeanette Haas =

Canadian soccer player

Personal information
- Date of birth: 3 January 1976 (age 50)
- Place of birth: North Vancouver, British Columbia, Canada
- Height: 1.65 m (5 ft 5 in)
- Position: Midfielder

International career
Years	Team	Apps	(Gls)
1999	Canada	7	(0)

Jeanette Haas (born 3 January 1976) is a Canadian soccer player who played as a midfielder for the Canada women's national soccer team. She was part of the team at the 1999 FIFA Women's World Cup.
