= Carla Brunozzi =

Italian footballer (born 1976)

Personal information
- Date of birth: 20 April 1976 (age 50)
- Place of birth: Teramo, Italy
- Position: Goalkeeper

International career
Years	Team	Apps	(Gls)
	Italy	3	(0)

Carla Brunozzi (born 20 April 1976) is an Italian former footballer who played as a goalkeeper for the Italy national team. She was part of the team at the UEFA Women's Euro 2001 and UEFA Women's Euro 2005.
