= Sarah Joly =

Canadian soccer player

Personal information
- Date of birth: 16 February 1977 (age 49)
- Place of birth: Lethbridge, Alberta, Canada
- Height: 1.68 m (5 ft 6 in)
- Position: Midfielder

International career^{‡}
Years	Team	Apps	(Gls)
1996–1999	Canada	17	(1)
- ‡ National team caps and goals as of 19 June 1999 (before the 1999 FIFA Women's World Cup)

Sarah Joly (born 16 February 1977) is a Canadian soccer player who played as a midfielder for the Canada women's national soccer team. She was part of the team at the 1999 FIFA Women's World Cup.
