= Patrizia Sberti =

Italian footballer

Personal information
- Date of birth: 6 July 1969 (age 57)
- Position: Forward

International career^{‡}
Years	Team	Apps	(Gls)
	Italy	17	
- ‡ National team caps and goals as of 19 June 1999 (before the 1999 FIFA Women's World Cup)

Patrizia Sberti (born 6 July 1969) is an Italian footballer who played as a forward for the Italy women's national football team. She was part of the team at the 1999 FIFA Women's World Cup.

== Career ==
=== Club career ===
She began playing in 1984 at the age of 15 with the newly founded Pisanova (which became Pisa two years later), and shortly after transferred to Ulivetese, where she played until 1986 in the Tuscan regional championships.

In 1986, she moved to Prato, where at the age of 17 she debuted in the Serie A championship, in which she would continue to play uninterruptedly until the end of her career. During this time, she played for Carrara, Firenze—with whom, during the 1990-1991 season, she finished second in the top scorer rankings behind Carolina Morace, with 21 goals—and Agliana. With Agliana, she won a championship in the 1994–1995 season—scoring 30 goals and again finishing second in the top scorer rankings, just one goal behind her teammate and leading scorer Morace—as well as an Italian Cup in the 1996–1997 season.

In the summer of 1997, she returned to Pisa, where she continued to play in Serie A for several years. In one of those seasons (the second), she scored 38 goals. She also played in the top division with Torres Terra Sarda (scoring 11 goals in the 2001–2002 season, during which she also participated in the UEFA Women's Cup and started in the Italian Super Cup final, which the team lost), and for one season with Enterprise Lazio (starting in the 2002 Italian Super Cup final, which they also lost), retiring at the end of the 2002–2003 season with a total of 309 goals scored in Serie A.

=== National team ===
Over the course of her career, she played a total of 17 matches with the national team.

In 1999, she was part of the team for the 1999 FIFA Women's World Cup, although she did not appear in any matches.

== Honours ==
=== Club ===
Italian Women's Championship: 1

- Agliana: 1994–1995

Italian Women's Cup: 1

- Agliana: 1996–1997
