= Gladys Enti =

Ghanaian footballer

Personal information
- Date of birth: 21 April 1975 (age 51)
- Position: Goalkeeper

Senior career*
Years	Team	Apps	(Gls)
- Ghatel Ladies

International career^{‡}
	Ghana	19	(0)
- * Club domestic league appearances and goals ‡ National team caps and goals as of 10 September 2007 (before the 2007 FIFA Women's World Cup)

Gladys Enti (born 21 April 1975) is a Ghanaian women's international footballer who plays as a goalkeeper. She is a member of the Ghana women's national football team. She was part of the team at the 1999 FIFA Women's World Cup, 2003 FIFA Women's World Cup and 2007 FIFA Women's World Cup. On club level she plays for Ghatel Ladies in Ghana.
