= Yulia Yushekivitch =

Russian footballer

Personal information
- Date of birth: 14 September 1980 (age 46)
- Position: Defender

Senior career*
Years	Team	Apps	(Gls)
1996–1997	Kaluzhanka		
1999–2003	Ryazan-VDV		
2004–2005	WFC Rossiyanka		

International career^{‡}
1998–1999	Russia		

Managerial career
- 2008: WFC Rossiyanka
- * Club domestic league appearances and goals ‡ National team caps and goals as of 19 June 1999 (before the 1999 FIFA Women's World Cup)

Yulia Yushekivitch (born 14 September 1980) is a Russian former footballer who played as a defender for the Russia women's national football team. She was part of the team at the 1999 FIFA Women's World Cup.
