= Stéphanie Trognon =

French footballer (born 1976)

Personal information
- Date of birth: 18 October 1976 (age 50)
- Position: Midfielder

International career
Years	Team	Apps	(Gls)
1997–1998	France	7	(0)

Stéphanie Trognon (born 18 October 1976) is a French footballer who played as a midfielder for French club ASPTT Strasbourg of the Division 1 Féminine.

== International career ==
Stéphanie Trognon represented France 7 times. Trognon was also part of the French team at the 1997 European Championships.

== Coaching career ==
Since retiring from professional football Trognon has become the coach of the FC Vendenheim.
