= Adanna Nwaneri =

Nigerian footballer

Personal information
- Date of birth: 31 August 1975 (age 51)
- Position: Defender

International career
| Years | Team | Apps | (Gls) |
- Nigeria

Managerial career
- Abia Angels FC

Adanna Nwaneri (born 31 August 1975) is a Nigerian former footballer who played as a defender for the Nigeria women's national football team. She was part of the team at the 1999 FIFA Women's World Cup.

== Early life ==
Adanna Nwaneri (born 31 August 1975) is a Nigerian former international footballer who played as a defender and later transitioned into coaching. She is the current Technical Adviser for Abia Angels FC and previously served as assistant coach for the Nigeria U‑17 women’s team, the Flamingoes.

== Playing career ==
Nwaneri represented the Nigeria women’s national football team as a defender. She was part of the squad at the 1999 FIFA Women’s World Cup held in the United States.

== Coaching career ==
After retiring as a player, Nwaneri moved into coaching. In July 2024, she was appointed Technical Adviser of Abia Angels FC, a club in the Nigeria Women Football League (NWFL). She also served as an assistant coach for the Nigeria U‑17 women's national team (Flamingoes), where she contributed to player development and tactical planning.
