= Linda Gren =

Swedish footballer

Personal information
- Date of birth: 12 November 1974 (age 51)
- Position: Midfielder

International career
| Years | Team | Apps | (Gls) |
| | Sweden | 1 | (0) |

Linda Gren (born 12 November 1974) is a Swedish former women's international footballer who played as a midfielder. She was a member of the Sweden women's national football team, and part of the team at the 1999 FIFA Women's World Cup.
