= Genevive Clottey =

Ghanaian footballer

Personal information
- Date of birth: 25 April 1969 (age 57)
- Position: Midfielder

International career^{‡}
| Years | Team | Apps | (Gls) |
| | Ghana | 6 | (0) |
- ‡ National team caps and goals as of 29 September 2003

Genevive Clottey (born 25 April 1969) is a Ghanaian women's international footballer who plays as a midfielder. She is a member of the Ghana women's national football team. She was part of the team at the 1999 FIFA Women's World Cup and 2003 FIFA Women's World Cup.
