= Elena Lissacheva =

Russian footballer (born 1973)

Personal information
- Date of birth: 25 November 1973 (age 52)
- Place of birth: Cheboksary, Soviet Union
- Position: Midfielder

International career^{‡}
Years	Team	Apps	(Gls)
1994–1999	Russia		
- ‡ National team caps and goals as of 19 June 1999 (before the 1999 FIFA Women's World Cup)

Elena Lissacheva (born 25 November 1973) is a former Russian footballer who played as a midfielder for the Russia women's national football team. She was part of the team at the 1999 FIFA Women's World Cup.
