= Anna Duò =

Italian footballer (born 1972)

Personal information
- Full name: Anna Giorgia Duò
- Date of birth: 8 August 1972 (age 54)
- Position: Defender

International career
Years	Team	Apps	(Gls)
1997–2001	Italy	23	(1)

Anna Giorgia Duò (born 8 August 1972) is an Italian footballer who played as a defender for the Italy women's national football team. She was part of the team at the 1999 FIFA Women's World Cup and UEFA Women's Euro 2001.
