= Susana Mora =

Mexican footballer (born 1979)

Susie Mora
Personal information
- Full name: Susana Mora Chávez
- Date of birth: 26 January 1979 (age 47)
- Place of birth: Santa Clara, California, United States
- Height: 1.68 m (5 ft 6 in)
- Position: Defender

College career
Years	Team	Apps	(Gls)
1997–2000	USC Trojans	78	(0)

International career^{‡}
1998–2003	Mexico	3	(0)
- ‡ National team caps and goals as of 29 June 1999

Susana "Susie" Mora Chávez (born 26 January 1979) is an American-born Mexican former women's international footballer who played as a defender. She was a member of the Mexico women's national football team for six years.

Born in the United States, Mora qualified to represent Mexico internationally through her parents. She was part of the team at the 1999 FIFA Women's World Cup.
