= Silvia Tagliacarne =

Italian footballer

Personal information
- Date of birth: 8 August 1975 (age 51)
- Position: Forward

International career^{‡}
| Years | Team | Apps | (Gls) |
- Italy
- ‡ National team caps and goals as of 19 June 1999 (before the 1999 FIFA Women's World Cup)

Silvia Tagliacarne (born 8 August 1975) is an Italian footballer who played as a forward for the Italy women's national football team. She was part of the team at the 1999 FIFA Women's World Cup and UEFA Women's Euro 2001.
