= Natalia Filippova =

Russian footballer (born 1975)

Personal information
- Date of birth: 7 February 1975 (age 51)
- Position: Defender

Youth career
- 1994: CSK VVS Samara

Senior career*
Years	Team	Apps	(Gls)
1995–2004	CSK VVS Samara	92	(11)
2005–2008	Ryazan		

International career^{‡}
- Russia
- * Club domestic league appearances and goals ‡ National team caps and goals as of 19 June 1999 (before the 1999 FIFA Women's World Cup)

Natalia Filippova (born 7 February 1975) is a former Russian footballer who played as a defender for the Russia women's national football team. She was part of the team at the 1999 FIFA Women's World Cup and the UEFA Women's Euro 2001.
