= Denise Ireta =

Mexican footballer (born 1980)

Personal information
- Full name: María del Carmen Denise Ireta González
- Date of birth: 4 January 1980 (age 46)
- Position: Midfielder

International career^{‡}
| Years | Team | Apps | (Gls) |
| | Mexico | 3 | (0) |
- ‡ National team caps and goals as of 29 June 1999

María del Carmen Denise Ireta González (born 4 January 1980), known as Denise Ireta, is a Mexican former women's international footballer who played as a midfielder. She is a member of the Mexico women's national football team. She was part of the team at the 1999 FIFA Women's World Cup.
