= Tatiana Cheverda =

Russian footballer (born 1974)

Personal information
- Full name: Tatiana Cheverda
- Date of birth: 29 August 1974 (age 52)
- Position: Defender

International career^{‡}
Years	Team	Apps	(Gls)
1995–1999	Russia	19	(0)
- ‡ National team caps and goals as of 19 June 1999 (before the 1999 FIFA Women's World Cup)

Tatiana Cheverda (born 29 August 1974) is a former Russian footballer who played as a defender for the Russia women's national football team. She was part of the team at the 1999 FIFA Women's World Cup.
