= Mary Beth Bowie =

Canadian soccer player

Personal information
- Date of birth: 27 October 1978 (age 48)
- Place of birth: Halifax, Nova Scotia, Canada
- Position: Midfielder

College career
Years	Team	Apps	(Gls)
1998–2000	Dalhousie Tigers		
2000–2001	Connecticut Huskies		

Senior career*
Years	Team	Apps	(Gls)
2001	Boston Renegades		

International career^{‡}
	Canada	13	(0)
- * Club domestic league appearances and goals ‡ National team caps and goals as of 19 June 1999 (before the 1999 FIFA Women's World Cup)

Mary Beth Bowie (born 27 October 1978) is a Canadian women's international soccer player who played as a midfielder. She has competed for the Canada women's national soccer team. She was part of the team at the 1999 FIFA Women's World Cup.

Born in Halifax, Nova Scotia, Bowie grew up in Dartmouth and attended Dalhousie University, before playing for the Connecticut Huskies women's soccer program in the U.S. Overall, Bowie made 13 appearances for the Canadian national team, including five starts.

Bowie played for the Boston Renegades in the W League, and followed that up by playing locally with Scotia Soccer Club, Athens Soccer Club and Halifax City Soccer Club.
