= Fabiana Comin =

Italian footballer and coach

Personal information
- Date of birth: 21 March 1970 (age 56)
- Place of birth: Fonte, Veneto, Italy
- Position: Goalkeeper

International career^{‡}
Years	Team	Apps	(Gls)
- Italy
- ‡ National team caps and goals as of 19 June 1999 (before the 1999 FIFA Women's World Cup)

Fabiana Comin (born 21 March 1970 in Fonte) is an Italian football coach and former footballer who played as a goalkeeper for the Italy women's national football team. She was part of the team at the 1999 FIFA Women's World Cup and UEFA Women's Euro 2001.
