= Hanne Nørregaard =

Danish footballer (born 1968)

Personal information
- Date of birth: 21 December 1968 (age 57)
- Place of birth: Denmark
- Position: Midfielder

Senior career*
Years	Team	Apps	(Gls)
–1997	Brøndby		
1998	Fortuna Hjørring	32	
1999	FB		

International career
1996–1999	Denmark	14	(5)
- * Club domestic league appearances and goals

Hanne Nørregaard (born 21 December 1968) is a Danish international footballer who played as a midfielder for the Denmark women's national football team. She was part of the team at the 1999 FIFA Women's World Cup.
