= Martha Moore =

Mexican footballer (born 1981)

Personal information
- Full name: Martha Ofelia Moore Camacho
- Date of birth: 14 April 1981 (age 45)
- Place of birth: Spring, Texas, United States
- Height: 1.63 m (5 ft 4 in)
- Position: Defender

Youth career
- Klein Oak High School

College career
Years	Team	Apps	(Gls)
1999–2002	Texas A&M Aggies		

International career^{‡}
1999–2002	Mexico	2	(0)
- ‡ National team caps and goals as of 29 June 1999

Martha Ofelia Moore Camacho (born 14 April 1981) is a retired international footballer who played as a defender. Born in the United States, she was a member of the Mexico women's national football team.

Born in the United States, Moore qualified to represent Mexico internationally through her mother. She was part of the team at the 1999 FIFA Women's World Cup and the 2002 CONCACAF Women's Gold Cup.
