= Ulla Knudsen =

Danish footballer (born 1976)

Personal information
- Full name: Ulla Lindbæk Knudsen
- Date of birth: 21 June 1976 (age 50)
- Position: Defender

College career
Years	Team	Apps	(Gls)
- Hartford University

Senior career*
Years	Team	Apps	(Gls)
1994–1996	Vejle B	65	
1997–2002	HEI		
2002–2003	Skovbakken		

International career
1992	Denmark U17	4	(3)
1994–1998	Denmark U21	21	(0)
1999–2001	Denmark	14	(0)
- * Club domestic league appearances and goals

Ulla Lindbæk Strøm (née Knudsen; born 21 June 1976) is a Danish footballer who played as a defender for the Denmark women's national football team. She was part of the team at the UEFA Women's Euro 2001 and 1999 FIFA Women's World Cup. Knudsen retired her active playing career in 2003 following a sustained period of injury issues.
