= Zhu Jing (footballer) =

Chinese footballer

Personal information
- Date of birth: 2 March 1978 (age 48)
- Position: Midfielder

International career^{‡}
Years	Team	Apps	(Gls)
- China
- ‡ National team caps and goals as of 19 June 1999 (before the 1999 FIFA Women's World Cup)

Zhu Jing (born 2 March 1978) is a Chinese women's international footballer who plays as a midfielder. She is a member of the China women's national football team. She was part of the team at the 1999 FIFA Women's World Cup.
