= Kim Sun-hui =

North Korean footballer (born 1972)

Personal information
- Date of birth: 4 April 1972 (age 54)
- Place of birth: Pyongyang, North Korea
- Position: Defender

Senior career*
Years	Team	Apps	(Gls)
- Pyongyang City Sports Club
- Wolmido Sports Club

International career
- North Korea
- * Club domestic league appearances and goals

- Kim Sun-hui
- Hangul: 김순희
- RR: Gim Sunhui
- MR: Kim Sunhŭi

Kim Sun-hui (Korean: 김순희; born 4 April 1972) is a North Korean footballer who played as a defender for the North Korea women's national football team. She was part of the team at the 1999 FIFA Women's World Cup. A tournament preview on the SoccerTimes.com website described her as: "the heart of the [team's] defense".

In February 1999 Kim played for a FIFA World XI in a 2–1 win over the United States, staged to coincide with the FIFA Women's World Cup draw.

North Korea qualified for their first FIFA Women's World Cup when they finished as 1997 AFC Women's Championship runners-up. They upset Japan 1–0 in the semi-final, in which Kim performed a marking job on Homare Sawa. She was praised by Japan's coach Satoshi Miyauchi: "Really skillful and a tremendous player. She's technically good, and she's a strong leader for the defense. She controls the other three defenders." After collecting her second yellow card of the tournament against Japan, she was suspended for North Korea's 2–0 final defeat by China.

At the 1998 Asian Games Kim captained North Korea to a silver medal following a golden goal defeat by China in the final.
