= Karina Christensen =

Danish footballer (born 1973)

Personal information
- Date of birth: 1 July 1973 (age 53)
- Position: Forward

International career^{‡}
Years	Team	Apps	(Gls)
- Denmark
- ‡ National team caps and goals as of 20 September 2003 (before the 1999 FIFA Women's World Cup)

Karina Christensen (born 1 July 1973) is a Danish footballer who played as a forward for the Denmark women's national football team. She was part of the team at the 1995 FIFA Women's World Cup and 1999 FIFA Women's World Cup.
