= Nancy Pinzón =

Mexican footballer (born 1974)

Personal information
- Full name: Nancy Georgina Pinzón Aguilera
- Date of birth: 6 June 1974 (age 52)
- Position: Forward

International career^{‡}
Years	Team	Apps	(Gls)
- Mexico
- ‡ National team caps and goals as of 19 June 1999 (before the 1999 FIFA Women's World Cup)

Nancy Georgina Pinzón Aguilera (born 6 June 1974) is a Mexican retired footballer who played as a forward. She has been a member of the Mexico women's national team.

== International career ==
Pinzón was part of the Mexican squad at the 1999 FIFA Women's World Cup, but made no appearances during the tournament.
