= Tánima Rubalcaba =

Mexican footballer (born 1980)

Personal information
- Full name: Tánima Rubalcaba Cantón
- Date of birth: 24 December 1980 (age 45)
- Position: Forward

International career^{‡}
Years	Team	Apps	(Gls)
- Mexico
- ‡ National team caps and goals as of 19 June 1999 (before the 1999 FIFA Women's World Cup)

Tánima Rubalcaba Cantón (born 24 December 1980) is a Mexican retired footballer who played as a forward. She has been a member of the Mexico women's national team.

== International career ==
Rubalcaba was part of the Mexican team at the 1999 FIFA Women's World Cup, but made no appearances during the tournament.
