= Linnea Quiñones =

American-born Mexican footballer (born 1980)

Personal information
- Full name: Linnea Andrea Quiñones Sandland (Note: Full name in her Mexican nationality.); Linnea Andrea Quinones (Note: Full name in her American nationality.)
- Date of birth: 17 July 1980 (age 46)
- Place of birth: San Diego, California, United States
- Position: Goalkeeper

College career
| Years | Team | Apps | (Gls) |
| 1998–2001 | San Diego State Aztecs | | |

International career^{‡}
| | Mexico | 3 | (0) |
- ‡ National team caps and goals as of 29 June 1999 (before the 1999 FIFA Women's World Cup)

Linnea Andrea "Lenny" Quiñones Sandland (born 17 July 1980) is an American-born Mexican former footballer who played as a goalkeeper. She has been a member of the Mexico women's national team.

== International career ==
Quiñones played for Mexico at senior level in the 1999 FIFA Women's World Cup.
