= Yvette Valdez =

Mexican football manager (born 1973)

Personal information
- Full name: Yvette Marie Valdez Bautista
- Birth name: Yvette Marie Valdez
- Date of birth: 16 October 1973 (age 53)
- Place of birth: Fresno, California, U.S.
- Position: Goalkeeper

Youth career
- –1991: San Joaquin Memorial Panthers

College career
Years	Team	Apps	(Gls)
1992–1993	Fresno City Rams		
1994–1995	Pacific Tigers		

Senior career*
Years	Team	Apps	(Gls)
1994–2001	California Storm		

International career
1998–1999	Mexico		

Managerial career
- 1992–1994: San Joaquin Memorial Panthers (women)
- 1996–2002: Pacific Tigers (women) (assistant)
- 2003–200?: Arizona Wildcats (women) (assistant)
- * Club domestic league appearances and goals

Yvette Marie Valdez Bautista (born 16 October 1973) is a football manager and former player who played as a goalkeeper. Born in the United States, she represented Mexico at international level.

== High school and college career ==
Valdez attended the San Joaquin Memorial High School, the Fresno City College and the University of the Pacific. She graduated from the latter in 1997 with a degree in sports medicine.

== Club career ==
Valdez has played for the California Storm for eight seasons.

== International career ==
Valdez was included in the Mexico squad for the 1999 FIFA Women's World Cup, but made no appearances during the tournament.

== Managerial career ==
Valdez worked as a coach of the San Joaquin Memorial High School women's team from 1992 to 1994. Two years later, she became an assistant coach for the Pacific Tigers and lasted there until 2002, primarily as a goalkeeping coach. In 2003, she joined as an assistant coach for the Arizona Wildcats women's soccer team.
