= Kye Yong-sun =

North Korean footballer (born 1972)

Personal information
- Date of birth: 27 March 1972 (age 54)
- Position: Goalkeeper

International career^{‡}
Years	Team	Apps	(Gls)
	North Korea	3	(0)
- ‡ National team caps and goals as of 29 June 1999 (before the 1999 FIFA Women's World Cup)

Kye Yong-sun (Korean: 계영순; born 27 March 1972) is a North Korean women's international footballer who plays as a goalkeeper. She is a member of the North Korea women's national football team. She was part of the team at the 1999 FIFA Women's World Cup.
