= Madleen Wilder =

German footballer

Personal information
- Date of birth: 6 July 1980 (age 46)
- Place of birth: Potsdam, Germany
- Position: Defender

Senior career*
Years	Team	Apps	(Gls)
- 1. FFC Turbine Potsdam

International career
- Germany
- * Club domestic league appearances and goals

Madleen Wilder (born 6 July 1980 in Potsdam) is a German women's international footballer who plays as a defender. She is a member of the Germany women's national football team. She was part of the team at the UEFA Women's Euro 2001. On club level she plays for 1. FFC Turbine Potsdam in Germany.
