= Kendyl Michner =

Mexican footballer (born 1978)

Personal information
- Full name: Kendyl Parker Michner Venable
- Birth name: Kendyl Parker Michner
- Date of birth: 3 May 1978 (age 48)
- Place of birth: Houston, Texas, U.S.
- Height: 1.73 m (5 ft 8 in)
- Position: Midfielder

Youth career
- Germantown Red Devils
- Memphis Futbol Club

College career
| Years | Team | Apps | (Gls) |
| 1996–1999 | Tennessee Lady Volunteers | | |

International career^{‡}
| 1998–1999 | Mexico | | |
- ‡ National team caps and goals as of 19 June 1999 (before the 1999 FIFA Women's World Cup)

Kendyl Parker Michner Venable (born 3 May 1978) is a former footballer who played as a midfielder. Born in the United States, she was a member of the Mexico women's national football team.

Michner was raised in Germantown, Tennessee and qualified to represent Mexico internationally through her father, who had been circumstantially born in Mexico City. She was part of the team at the 1999 FIFA Women's World Cup.
