= Lise Søndergaard =

Danish footballer (born 1973)

Personal information
- Full name: Lise Bojer Søndergaard
- Date of birth: 27 October 1973 (age 53)
- Positions: Midfielder; defender

Senior career*
Years	Team	Apps	(Gls)
- HEI Aarhus
	Vejle B	99	

International career
1998–2001	Denmark	14	(1)
- * Club domestic league appearances and goals

Lise Bojer Søndergaard (born 27 October 1973) is a Danish former international footballer who played as a defender or midfielder. She was a member of the Denmark women's national football team. She was part of the team at the 1999 FIFA Women's World Cup and at the UEFA Women's Euro 2001. On club level she played for HEI Aarhus in Denmark.
