= Marlene Kristensen =

Danish footballer (born 1973)

Personal information
- Date of birth: 28 May 1973 (age 53)
- Position: Defender

Senior career*
Years	Team	Apps	(Gls)
- OB

International career
1997–2000	Denmark	20	(1)

Managerial career
- 2005–2006: OB
- * Club domestic league appearances and goals

Marlene Kristensen (born 28 May 1973) is a Danish football coach and former international footballer who played as a defender. She earned 20 caps and scored one goal for the Denmark national team.

Kristensen played for OB and was part of the team that won the club its first ever league title in 2000. She played 20 matches for Denmark women's national football team and scored one goal between 1997 and 2000. She was part of the team at the 1999 FIFA Women's World Cup. However, she played only a few minutes of one match (against North Korea), when she fell in an unfortunate manner and broke a leg.

Originally, she played in Odense, Denmark, but she also played in clubs in the United States and Australia.
