= Larissa Kapitonova =

Russian footballer (born 1970)

Personal information
- Date of birth: 4 May 1970 (age 56)
- Place of birth: Cheboksary, Soviet Union
- Position: Goalkeeper

International career^{‡}
Years	Team	Apps	(Gls)
- Russia
- ‡ National team caps and goals as of 19 June 1999 (before the 1999 FIFA Women's World Cup)

Larissa Kapitonova (born 4 May 1970) is a former Russian footballer who played as a goalkeeper for the Russia women's national football team. She was part of the team at the 1999 FIFA Women's World Cup and the UEFA Women's Euro 2001.
