= Daniela Tavalazzi =

Italian footballer (born 1972)

Personal information
- Date of birth: 8 August 1972 (age 54)
- Position: Defender

International career^{‡}
Years	Team	Apps	(Gls)
- Italy
- ‡ National team caps and goals as of 19 June 1999 (before the 1999 FIFA Women's World Cup)

Daniela Tavalazzi (born 8 August 1972) is an Italian footballer who played as a defender for the Italy women's national football team. She was part of the team at the UEFA Women's Euro 1997 and 1999 FIFA Women's World Cup.
