= Damiana Deiana =

Italian footballer (born 1970)

Personal information
- Date of birth: 26 June 1970 (age 56)
- Position: Defender

International career^{‡}
Years	Team	Apps	(Gls)
- Italy
- ‡ National team caps and goals as of 19 June 1999 (before the 1999 FIFA Women's World Cup)

Damiana Deiana (born 26 June 1970) is an Italian footballer who played as a defender for the Italy women's national football team. She was part of the team at the 1999 FIFA Women's World Cup.
