= Christina Jensen =

Danish footballer (born 1974)

Personal information
- Date of birth: 21 January 1974 (age 52)
- Place of birth: Denmark
- Position: Goalkeeper

Youth career
- –1993: Ringsted BK

Senior career*
Years	Team	Apps	(Gls)
1994	B 1909		
1995–1998	OB		
1999–	BK Rødovre		

International career
1995–1999	Denmark	11	(0)
- * Club domestic league appearances and goals

Christina Jensen (born 21 January 1974) is a Danish footballer who played as a goalkeeper for the Danish national team.

She was part of the Denmark women's national football team at the 1996 Summer Olympics, but did not play. She participated in the 1999 FIFA Women's World Cup.

== See also ==
- Denmark at the 1996 Summer Olympics
