= Japan women's national football team results (1990–1999) =

This page records the details of the Japan women's national football team from 1990 to 1999.

== 1990 ==
=== Results ===
1990.09.06	Japan	13–1	South Korea	South Korea
	Kioka (?); Nagamine (?); Takakura (?); Matsuda (?); Tezuka (?)		? (?)

1990.09.09	Japan	5–0	South Korea	South Korea
	Kioka (?); Kuroda (?); Noda (?); Mizuma (?); Tezuka (?)

1990.09.27	Japan	0–5	China	China
			? (?) ? (?) ? (?) ? (?) ? (?)

1990.09.29	Japan	8–1	South Korea	China
	Kioka (?); Handa (?); Nagamine (?); Noda (?); Mizuma (?); Hironaka (?)		? (?)

1990.10.01	Japan	5–0	Hong Kong	China
	Kioka (?); Handa (?); Nagamine (?); Matsuda (?)

1990.10.03	Japan	3–1	Chinese Taipei	China
	Handa (?); Nagamine (?)		? (?)

1990.10.06	Japan	1–1	North Korea	China
	Mizuma (?)		? (?)

=== Players statistics ===
Player	−1989	09.06	09.09	09.27	09.29	10.01	10.03	10.06	1990	Total
Futaba Kioka	38(18)	O(2)	O(1)	O	O(2)	O(2)	O	O	7(7)	45(25)
Etsuko Handa	37(10)	O	-	O	O(1)	O(1)	O(2)	O	6(4)	43(14)
Kaori Nagamine	31(27)	O(3)	-	O	O(2)	O(1)	O(1)	O	6(7)	37(34)
Masae Suzuki	30(0)	O	-	O	-	O	O	O	5(0)	35(0)
Michiko Matsuda	29(6)	O(1)	-	O	-	O(1)	O	O	5(2)	34(8)
Mayumi Kaji	29(0)	O	O	O	O	O	O	O	7(0)	36(0)
Midori Honda	29(0)	O	-	O	-	O	O	O	5(0)	34(0)
Akemi Noda	27(3)	O	O(1)	O	O(1)	O	O	O	7(2)	34(5)
Asako Takakura	26(10)	O(2)	O	O	-	O	-	-	4(2)	30(12)
Takako Tezuka	26(8)	O(5)	O(1)	-	O	O	-	-	4(6)	30(14)
Yoko Takahagi	21(0)	O	O	O	O	-	O	O	6(0)	27(0)
Kazuko Hironaka	18(2)	O	O	-	O(1)	-	-	-	3(1)	21(3)
Sayuri Yamaguchi	18(0)	-	-	-	-	O	-	-	1(0)	19(0)
Yumi Watanabe	11(2)	O	O	O	O	-	O	O	6(0)	17(2)
Tomoko Matsunaga	6(0)	-	O	-	O	-	-	-	2(0)	8(0)
Kyoko Kuroda	4(6)	-	O(1)	-	-	O	-	-	2(1)	6(7)
Megumi Sakata	1(0)	-	O	-	O	-	-	-	2(0)	3(0)
Yuriko Mizuma	0(0)	-	O(1)	-	O(1)	O	O	O(1)	5(3)	5(3)

== 1991 ==
=== Results ===
1991.04.01	Japan	1–3	France	Bulgaria
	Noda (?)		? (?) ? (?) ? (?)

1991.04.03	Japan	2–2	Sweden	Bulgaria
	Noda (?); Mizuma (?)		? (?) ? (?)

1991.04.05	Japan	2–0	Hungary	Bulgaria
	Kioka (?); Takakura (?)

1991.05.26	Japan	1–0	North Korea	Fukuoka, Japan
	Nagamine (?)			Stadium: Heiwadai Athletic Stadium

1991.05.28	Japan	4–1	Hong Kong	Fukuoka, Japan
	Tezuka (?); Nagamine (?); Takakura (?)		? (?)	Stadium: Heiwadai Athletic Stadium

1991.06.01	Japan	12–0	Malaysia	Fukuoka, Japan
	Tezuka (?); Handa (?); Nagamine (?); Noda (?); Mizuma (?)			Stadium: Fukuoka Kasuga Park Stadium

1991.06.03	Japan	10–0	Singapore	Fukuoka, Japan
	Matsuda (?); Tezuka (?); Noda (?); Takakura (?); Yamaguchi (?); Uchiyama (?)			Stadium: Heiwadai Athletic Stadium

1991.06.06	Japan	0–0 (pen 5–4)	Chinese Taipei	Fukuoka, Japan
				Stadium: Hakatanomori Athletic Stadium

1991.06.08	Japan	0–5	China	Fukuoka, Japan
			? (?) ? (?) ? (?) ? (?) ? (?)	Stadium: Hakatanomori Athletic Stadium

1991.08.21	Japan	0–0	China	China

1991.11.17	Japan	0–1	Brazil	China
			? (?)

1991.11.19	Japan	0–8	Sweden	China
			? (?) ? (?) ? (?) ? (?) ? (?) ? (?) ? (?) ? (?)

1991.11.21	Japan	0–3	United States	China
			? (?) ? (?) ? (?)

=== Players statistics ===
Player	−1990	04.01	04.03	04.05	05.26	05.28	06.01	06.03	06.06	06.08	08.21	11.17	11.19	11.21	1991	Total
Futaba Kioka	45(25)	O	O	O(1)	-	-	-	-	-	-	-	O	O	O	6(1)	51(26)
Etsuko Handa	43(14)	O	-	O	O	O	O(2)	-	O	O	-	-	-	O	8(2)	51(16)
Kaori Nagamine	37(34)	O	O	-	O(1)	O(1)	O(3)	O	O	O	O	O	O	O	12(5)	49(39)
Mayumi Kaji	36(0)	O	O	O	O	O	O	-	O	O	O	O	O	O	12(0)	48(0)
Masae Suzuki	35(0)	O	O	-	O	O	-	-	O	O	O	O	O	O	10(0)	45(0)
Michiko Matsuda	34(8)	O	O	-	O	O	-	O(2)	O	O	O	O	O	O	11(2)	45(10)
Akemi Noda	34(5)	O(1)	O(1)	O	O	O	O(3)	O(2)	O	O	O	O	O	O	13(7)	47(12)
Midori Honda	34(0)	O	O	-	O	-	-	O	O	-	O	O	O	O	9(0)	43(0)
Takako Tezuka	30(14)	-	O	O	-	O(1)	O(3)	O(1)	O	O	O	O	O	O	11(5)	41(19)
Asako Takakura	30(12)	O	O	O(1)	O	O(2)	-	O(1)	O	O	O	O	O	O	12(4)	42(16)
Yoko Takahagi	27(0)	-	-	O	-	O	O	-	-	O	-	-	-	-	4(0)	31(0)
Sayuri Yamaguchi	19(0)	O	O	-	-	O	O	O(1)	-	-	O	O	O	O	9(1)	28(1)
Yumi Watanabe	17(2)	-	O	O	-	-	-	-	-	-	-	-	-	-	2(0)	19(2)
Tomoko Matsunaga	8(0)	-	-	O	-	O	O	-	O	O	-	-	-	-	5(0)	13(0)
Kyoko Kuroda	6(7)	O	-	O	O	-	O	O	O	O	O	O	O	O	11(0)	17(7)
Yuriko Mizuma	5(3)	O	O(1)	O	O	-	O(1)	O	O	O	O	O	O	-	11(2)	16(5)
Megumi Sakata	3(0)	-	-	O	-	-	O	O	-	-	-	-	-	-	3(0)	6(0)
Noriko Ishibashi	1(1)	-	-	-	-	-	O	O	-	-	-	-	-	-	2(0)	3(1)
Tamaki Uchiyama	0(0)	-	-	-	O	-	O	O(3)	O	O	O	-	-	-	6(3)	6(3)
Ryoko Kobayashi	0(0)	-	-	-	-	-	-	O	-	-	-	-	-	-	1(0)	1(0)
Yumi Obe	0(0)	-	-	-	-	-	-	-	-	-	O	-	-	-	1(0)	1(0)

== 1993 ==
=== Results ===
1993.12.04	Japan	6–1	Chinese Taipei	Malaysia
	Haneta (?); Takakura (?); Handa (?); Nagamine (?); Mizuma (?)		? (?)

1993.12.06	Japan	15–0	Philippines	Malaysia
	Kioka (?); Takakura (?); Sawa (?); Nagamine (?); Mizuma (?); Handa (?)

1993.12.08	Japan	4–0	Hong Kong	Malaysia
	Tomei (?); Takakura (?); Kadohara (?)

1993.12.10	Japan	1–3	China	Malaysia
	Takakura (?)		? (?) ? (?) ? (?)

1993.12.12	Japan	3–0	Chinese Taipei	Malaysia
	Kioka (?); Handa (?); Mizuma (?)

=== Players statistics ===
Player	−1992	12.04	12.06	12.08	12.10	12.12	1993	Total
Futaba Kioka	51(26)	O	O(1)	O	O	O(1)	5(2)	56(28)
Etsuko Handa	51(16)	O(1)	O(1)	O	O	O(1)	5(3)	56(19)
Kaori Nagamine	49(39)	O(1)	O(4)	-	O	O	4(5)	53(44)
Akemi Noda	47(12)	O	-	O	O	O	4(0)	51(12)
Asako Takakura	42(16)	O(2)	O(2)	O(1)	O(1)	O	5(6)	47(22)
Sayuri Yamaguchi	28(1)	-	O	-	-	-	1(0)	29(1)
Yuriko Mizuma	16(5)	O(1)	O(3)	O	O	O(1)	5(5)	21(10)
Megumi Sakata	6(0)	-	-	O	-	-	1(0)	7(0)
Ryoko Uno	1(0)	O	-	O	O	O	4(0)	5(0)
Yumi Obe	1(0)	-	O	O	-	-	2(0)	3(0)
Maki Haneta	0(0)	O(1)	O	O	O	O	5(1)	5(1)
Homare Sawa	0(0)	-	O(4)	O	O	O	4(4)	4(4)
Kaoru Kadohara	0(0)	O	-	O(1)	O	O	4(1)	4(1)
Junko Ozawa	0(0)	O	O	-	O	O	4(0)	4(0)
Rie Yamaki	0(0)	O	O	-	O	O	4(0)	4(0)
Yumi Tomei	0(0)	-	O	O(2)	-	-	2(2)	2(2)
Yuko Morimoto	0(0)	-	O	O	-	-	2(0)	2(0)

== 1994 ==
=== Results ===
1994.08.20	Japan	2–0	Slovakia	Slovakia
	Sawa (?); Otake (?)

1994.08.21	Japan	1–0	Austria	Slovakia
	Morimoto (?)

1994.09.27	Japan	2–2	Australia	Tokyo, Japan
	Noda (?); Takakura (?)		? (?) ? (?)	Stadium: National Stadium

1994.10.04	Japan	5–0	South Korea	Hiroshima, Japan
	Noda (?); Otake (?); Uchiyama (?); Nagamine (?)			Stadium: Fukuyama Takegahana Stadium

1994.10.06	Japan	3–0	Chinese Taipei	Hiroshima, Japan
	Noda (?); Takakura (?); Kioka (?)			Stadium: Fukuyama Takegahana Stadium

1994.10.10	Japan	1–1	China	Hiroshima, Japan
	Otake (?)		? (?)	Stadium: Fukuyama Takegahana Stadium

1994.10.12	Japan	0–2	China	Hiroshima, Japan
			? (?) ? (?)	Stadium: Fukuyama Takegahana Stadium

=== Players statistics ===
Player	−1993	08.20	08.21	09.27	10.04	10.06	10.10	10.12	1994	Total
Futaba Kioka	56(28)	O	-	O	O	O(1)	-	O	5(1)	61(29)
Etsuko Handa	56(19)	O	-	O	O	O	-	O	5(0)	61(19)
Kaori Nagamine	53(44)	-	O	O	O(2)	-	O	O	5(2)	58(46)
Akemi Noda	51(12)	O	-	O(1)	O(1)	O(1)	O	O	6(3)	57(15)
Asako Takakura	47(22)	O	O	O(1)	O	O(1)	O	O	7(2)	54(24)
Yuriko Mizuma	21(10)	-	O	-	-	-	-	-	1(0)	22(10)
Kyoko Kuroda	17(7)	O	-	-	-	O	O	O	4(0)	21(7)
Megumi Sakata	7(0)	-	O	-	-	-	-	-	1(0)	8(0)
Tamaki Uchiyama	6(3)	-	O	O	O(1)	O	O	-	5(1)	11(4)
Maki Haneta	5(1)	O	O	O	O	O	O	O	7(0)	12(1)
Homare Sawa	4(4)	O(1)	-	O	O	O	O	O	6(1)	10(5)
Kaoru Kadohara	4(1)	-	O	-	-	-	O	-	2(0)	6(1)
Junko Ozawa	4(0)	O	-	O	O	O	O	O	6(0)	10(0)
Rie Yamaki	4(0)	O	-	O	O	O	O	O	6(0)	10(0)
Yumi Tomei	2(2)	O	-	O	O	O	O	O	6(0)	8(2)
Yuko Morimoto	2(0)	-	O	-	-	-	-	-	1(0)	3(0)
Nami Otake	0(0)	O(1)	-	O	O(1)	O	O(1)	O	6(3)	6(3)
Tsuru Morimoto	0(0)	-	O(1)	O	O	-	O	-	4(1)	4(1)
Terumi Nagae	0(0)	-	O	-	-	-	-	-	1(0)	1(0)
Yuki Fushimi	0(0)	-	O	-	-	-	-	-	1(0)	1(0)
Inesu Emiko Takeoka	0(0)	-	O	-	-	-	-	-	1(0)	1(0)
Minako Takashima	0(0)	-	O	-	-	-	-	-	1(0)	1(0)
Etsuko Tahara	0(0)	-	O	-	-	-	-	-	1(0)	1(0)

== 1995 ==
=== Results ===
1995.05.05	Japan	1–0	Canada	Tokyo, Japan
	Otake (?)			Stadium: Nishigaoka Soccer Stadium

1995.06.05	Japan	0–1	Germany	Sweden
			? (?)

1995.06.07	Japan	2–1	Brazil	Sweden
	Noda (?)		? (?)

1995.06.09	Japan	0–2	Sweden	Sweden
			? (?) ? (?)

1995.06.13	Japan	0–4	United States	Sweden
			? (?) ? (?) ? (?) ? (?)

1995.09.22	Japan	1–0	South Korea	Malaysia
	Noda (?)

1995.09.25	Japan	6–0	India	Malaysia
	Obe (?); Otake (?); Takeoka (?); Nagamine (?)

1995.09.27	Japan	17–0	Uzbekistan	Malaysia
	Tomei (?); Otake (?); Noda (?); Takeoka (?); Uchiyama (?)

1995.09.30	Japan	3–0	Chinese Taipei	Malaysia
	Tomei (?); Noda (?); Uchiyama (?)

1995.10.02	Japan	0–2	China	Malaysia
			? (?) ? (?)

=== Players statistics ===
Player	−1994	05.05	06.05	06.07	06.09	06.13	09.22	09.25	09.27	09.30	10.02	1995	Total
Futaba Kioka	61(29)	O	O	O	O	O	O	-	O	O	O	9(0)	70(29)
Etsuko Handa	61(19)	O	O	-	O	O	-	O	O	O	-	7(0)	68(19)
Kaori Nagamine	58(46)	O	O	-	-	-	O	O(2)	-	O	-	5(2)	63(48)
Akemi Noda	57(15)	O	O	O(2)	O	O	O(1)	-	O(4)	O(1)	O	9(8)	66(23)
Asako Takakura	54(24)	O	O	O	O	O	O	-	O	O	O	9(0)	63(24)
Maki Haneta	12(1)	O	O	O	O	O	-	-	O	O	O	8(0)	20(1)
Tamaki Uchiyama	11(4)	O	O	O	O	O	O	-	O(8)	O(1)	O	9(9)	20(13)
Homare Sawa	10(5)	O	O	O	O	-	O	-	O	O	O	8(0)	18(5)
Rie Yamaki	10(0)	O	O	O	O	O	O	O	O	O	O	10(0)	20(0)
Junko Ozawa	10(0)	O	O	O	O	O	-	-	-	-	-	5(0)	15(0)
Yumi Tomei	8(2)	O	O	-	-	O	O	O	O(2)	O(1)	O	8(3)	16(5)
Megumi Sakata	8(0)	-	-	-	-	-	-	O	-	-	-	1(0)	9(0)
Nami Otake	6(3)	O(1)	-	O	O	O	-	O(1)	O(2)	O	O	8(4)	14(7)
Kaoru Kadohara	6(1)	-	-	-	-	-	O	O	-	-	-	2(0)	8(1)
Tsuru Morimoto	4(1)	-	-	-	-	-	-	O	-	-	-	1(0)	5(1)
Yumi Obe	3(0)	O	O	O	O	O	O	O(1)	O	O	O	10(1)	13(1)
Inesu Emiko Takeoka	1(0)	-	-	-	-	-	-	O(2)	O(1)	-	-	2(3)	3(3)
Kae Nishina	0(0)	O	O	O	O	O	O	O	O	O	-	9(0)	9(0)
Shiho Onodera	0(0)	-	-	-	-	-	O	-	O	O	O	4(0)	4(0)

== 1996 ==
=== Results ===
1996.05.11	Japan	0–3	China	United States
			? (?) ? (?) ? (?)

1996.05.16	Japan	0–4	United States	United States
			? (?) ? (?) ? (?) ? (?)

1996.05.18	Japan	0–0 (pen 4–3)	Canada	United States

1996.05.26	Japan	1–1	Denmark	Tokyo, Japan
	Obe (?)		? (?)	Stadium: National Stadium

1996.05.29	Japan	3–4	Denmark	Fukuoka, Japan
	Uchiyama (?)		? (?) ? (?) ? (?) ? (?)	Stadium: Hakatanomori Football Stadium

1996.07.10	Japan	2–2	Australia	United States
	Sawa (?)		? (?) ? (?)

1996.07.15	Japan	1–3	Sweden	United States
	Sawa (?)		? (?) ? (?) ? (?)

1996.07.21	Japan	2–3	Germany	United States
	Kioka (?); Noda (?)		? (?) ? (?) ? (?)

1996.07.23	Japan	0–2	Brazil	United States
			? (?) ? (?)

1996.07.25	Japan	0–4	Norway	United States
			? (?) ? (?) ? (?) ? (?)

=== Players statistics ===
Player	−1995	05.11	05.16	05.18	05.26	05.29	07.10	07.15	07.21	07.23	07.25	1996	Total
Futaba Kioka	70(29)	-	-	-	-	-	O	O	O(1)	O	O	5(1)	75(30)
Etsuko Handa	68(19)	O	-	O	O	O	O	O	O	-	-	7(0)	75(19)
Akemi Noda	66(23)	O	O	O	O	O	O	O	O(1)	O	O	10(1)	76(24)
Kaori Nagamine	63(48)	-	-	O	-	-	-	-	-	-	-	1(0)	64(48)
Asako Takakura	63(24)	O	O	O	O	O	O	O	O	O	O	10(0)	73(24)
Tamaki Uchiyama	20(13)	O	O	-	O	O(3)	O	-	O	O	O	8(3)	28(16)
Maki Haneta	20(1)	O	O	O	O	O	-	O	O	O	O	9(0)	29(1)
Rie Yamaki	20(0)	O	O	O	O	O	O	O	O	O	O	10(0)	30(0)
Homare Sawa	18(5)	O	O	O	O	O	O(2)	O(1)	O	O	O	10(3)	28(8)
Yumi Tomei	16(5)	O	O	-	O	O	O	O	O	O	O	9(0)	25(5)
Junko Ozawa	15(0)	O	-	-	O	O	-	-	O	O	-	5(0)	20(0)
Nami Otake	14(7)	O	O	-	O	O	O	O	-	O	-	7(0)	21(7)
Yumi Obe	13(1)	O	O	O	O(1)	O	O	O	O	O	O	10(1)	23(2)
Kae Nishina	9(0)	O	O	O	O	O	O	O	O	O	O	10(0)	19(0)
Megumi Sakata	9(0)	-	O	-	-	-	-	-	-	-	-	1(0)	10(0)
Kaoru Kadohara	8(1)	-	-	O	-	O	O	-	-	-	O	4(0)	12(1)
Ryoko Uno	5(0)	-	-	O	-	-	-	-	-	-	-	1(0)	6(0)
Shiho Onodera	4(0)	-	-	O	-	-	O	O	-	-	O	4(0)	8(0)
Miyuki Izumi	0(0)	-	O	O	O	-	O	-	-	-	O	5(0)	5(0)
Rie Kimura	0(0)	-	O	O	-	-	-	-	-	-	-	2(0)	2(0)

== 1997 ==
=== Results ===
1997.06.08	Japan	1–0	China	Tokyo, Japan
	Mitsui (?)			Stadium: National Stadium

1997.06.15	Japan	0–0	China	Osaka, Japan
				Stadium: Osaka Nagai Stadium

1997.12.05	Japan	21–0	Guam	China
	Nishina (?); Sawa (?); Morimoto (?); Yanagita (?); Omatsu (?); Otake (?); Uchiyama (?); Yamaki (?)

1997.12.07	Japan	1–0	India	China
	Sawa (?)

1997.12.09	Japan	9–0	Hong Kong	China
	Yamaki (?); Tomei (?); Sawa (?); Morimoto (?); Yanagita (?); Mitsui (?); Uchiyama (?)

1997.12.12	Japan	0–1	North Korea	China
			? (?)

1997.12.14	Japan	2–0	Chinese Taipei	China
	Sawa (?)

=== Players statistics ===
Player	−1996	06.08	06.15	12.05	12.07	12.09	12.12	12.14	1997	Total
Rie Yamaki	30(0)	O	O	O(1)	O	O(1)	O	O	7(2)	37(2)
Maki Haneta	29(1)	-	O	-	-	-	-	-	1(0)	30(1)
Tamaki Uchiyama	28(16)	O	O	O(3)	O	O(1)	O	-	6(4)	34(20)
Homare Sawa	28(8)	O	O	O(7)	O(1)	O(3)	O	O(2)	7(13)	35(21)
Yumi Tomei	25(5)	O	O	O	O	O(1)	O	-	6(1)	31(6)
Yumi Obe	23(2)	O	O	-	O	O	-	-	4(0)	27(2)
Nami Otake	21(7)	O	O	O(6)	O	-	O	O	6(6)	27(13)
Junko Ozawa	20(0)	O	-	-	-	-	-	-	1(0)	21(0)
Kae Nishina	19(0)	O	O	O(1)	O	O	O	O	7(1)	26(1)
Yuko Morimoto	3(0)	-	-	O(1)	O	O(1)	O	O	5(2)	8(2)
Tomoe Sakai	0(0)	O	O	O	O	O	O	O	7(0)	7(0)
Tomomi Mitsui	0(0)	O(1)	O	-	O	O(1)	O	O	6(2)	6(2)
Mayumi Omatsu	0(0)	O	-	O(1)	O	O	O	O	6(1)	6(1)
Hiromi Isozaki	0(0)	O	-	O	O	O	O	O	6(0)	6(0)
Nozomi Yamago	0(0)	-	O	O	O	O	O	O	6(0)	6(0)
Miyuki Yanagita	0(0)	-	-	O(1)	-	O(1)	O	-	3(2)	3(2)
Yumi Umeoka	0(0)	-	O	O	-	O	-	-	3(0)	3(0)
Mai Nakachi	0(0)	-	-	O	-	-	-	O	2(0)	2(0)
Mito Isaka	0(0)	-	O	-	-	-	-	-	1(0)	1(0)
Kaoru Nagadome	0(0)	-	O	-	-	-	-	-	1(0)	1(0)
Tomomi Fujimura	0(0)	-	O	-	-	-	-	-	1(0)	1(0)

== 1998 ==
=== Results ===
1998.05.17	Japan	1–2	United States	Tokyo, Japan
	Otake (?)		? (?) ? (?)	Stadium: National Stadium

1998.05.21	Japan	0–2	United States	Hyogo, Japan
			? (?) ? (?)	Stadium: Kobe Universiade Memorial Stadium

1998.05.24	Japan	0–3	United States	Kanagawa, Japan
			? (?) ? (?) ? (?)	Stadium: International Stadium Yokohama

1998.10.24	Japan	1–1	South Korea	South Korea
	Otake (?)		? (?)

1998.10.26	Japan	1–1	South Korea	South Korea
	Sugawara (?)		? (?)

1998.12.08	Japan	6–0	Thailand	Thailand
	Sawa (?); Mitsui (?); Otake (?); Uchiyama (?); Isaka (?)

1998.12.10	Japan	2–3	North Korea	Thailand
	Otake (?); Isaka (?)		? (?) ? (?) ? (?)

1998.12.12	Japan	8–0	Vietnam	Thailand
	Sawa (?); Isaka (?); Yamagishi (?); Kishi (?); Sugawara (?)

1998.12.15	Japan	0–3	China	Thailand
			? (?) ? (?) ? (?)

1998.12.17	Japan	2–1	Chinese Taipei	Thailand
	Yamaki (?); Otake (?)		? (?)

=== Players statistics ===
Player	−1997	05.17	05.21	05.24	10.24	10.26	12.08	12.10	12.12	12.15	12.17	1998	Total
Rie Yamaki	37(2)	O	O	O	-	-	O	O	O	O	O(1)	8(1)	45(3)
Homare Sawa	35(21)	O	O	O	O	O	O(1)	O	O(3)	O	O	10(4)	45(25)
Tamaki Uchiyama	34(20)	O	O	O	O	O	O(2)	O	O	O	O	10(2)	44(22)
Yumi Tomei	31(6)	O	-	-	O	O	-	-	O	O	O	6(0)	37(6)
Nami Otake	27(13)	O(1)	O	O	O(1)	-	O(1)	O(1)	O	O	O(1)	9(5)	36(18)
Yumi Obe	27(2)	-	-	-	O	O	O	O	-	O	-	5(0)	32(2)
Kae Nishina	26(1)	O	O	O	O	O	O	O	O	O	O	10(0)	36(1)
Yuko Morimoto	8(2)	-	O	O	-	-	-	-	-	-	-	2(0)	10(2)
Shiho Onodera	8(0)	-	-	-	-	O	-	-	O	-	-	2(0)	10(0)
Tomoe Sakai	7(0)	O	O	O	O	O	O	O	-	O	O	9(0)	16(0)
Tomomi Mitsui	6(2)	O	O	O	O	O	O(1)	O	O	O	O	10(1)	16(3)
Mayumi Omatsu	6(1)	O	O	O	O	O	-	-	-	-	-	5(0)	11(1)
Hiromi Isozaki	6(0)	O	O	O	-	O	O	O	O	O	O	9(0)	15(0)
Nozomi Yamago	6(0)	O	O	O	O	-	O	O	-	O	O	8(0)	14(0)
Yumi Umeoka	3(0)	-	O	-	-	-	-	-	-	-	-	1(0)	4(0)
Mai Nakachi	2(0)	-	O	O	O	-	-	-	O	O	-	5(0)	7(0)
Mito Isaka	1(0)	-	-	-	O	-	O(1)	O(1)	O(1)	O	O	6(3)	7(3)
Miki Sugawara	0(0)	O	O	O	-	O(1)	O	O	O(1)	-	-	7(2)	7(2)
Kazumi Kishi	0(0)	-	O	O	-	O	O	-	O(2)	-	-	5(2)	5(2)
Yasuyo Yamagishi	0(0)	-	-	-	-	-	O	-	O(1)	O	O	4(1)	4(1)
Ayumi Hara	0(0)	O	O	O	-	-	-	-	-	-	-	3(0)	3(0)

== 1999 ==
=== Results ===
1999.03.24	Japan	1–0	France	France
	Kobayashi (?)

1999.04.29	Japan	0–9	United States	United States
			? (?) ? (?) ? (?) ? (?) ? (?) ? (?) ? (?) ? (?) ? (?)

1999.05.02	Japan	0–7	United States	United States
			? (?) ? (?) ? (?) ? (?) ? (?) ? (?) ? (?)

1999.05.30	Japan	1–1	South Korea	Kyoto, Japan
	Uchiyama (?)		? (?)	Stadium: Nishikyogoku Athletic Stadium

1999.06.03	Japan	3–2	South Korea	Tokyo, Japan
	Kobayashi (?); Uchiyama (?); Otake (?)		? (?) ? (?)	Stadium: National Stadium

1999.06.19	Japan	1–1	Canada	United States
	Otake (?)		? (?)

1999.06.23	Japan	0–5	Russia	United States
			? (?) ? (?) ? (?) ? (?) ? (?)

1999.06.26	Japan	0–4	Norway	United States
			? (?) ? (?) ? (?) ? (?)

1999.11.08	Japan	9–0	Thailand	Philippines
	Yamagishi (?); Isaka (?); Uchiyama (?); Takakura (?); Otake (?)

1999.11.10	Japan	5–1	Uzbekistan	Philippines
	Obe (?); Takakura (?); Otake (?)		? (?)

1999.11.12	Japan	14–0	Nepal	Philippines
	Obe (?); Yamagishi (?); Mitsui (?); Mikami (?); Isaka (?); Aizawa (?); Takakura (?); Uchiyama (?); Kasajima (?)

1999.11.14	Japan	6–0	Philippines	Philippines
	Yamagishi (?); Hara (?); Isaka (?); Aizawa (?)

1999.11.19	Japan	0–2	Chinese Taipei	Philippines
			? (?) ? (?)

1999.11.21	Japan	2–3	North Korea	Philippines
	Otake (?)		? (?) ? (?) ? (?)

=== Players statistics ===
Player	−1998	03.24	04.29	05.02	05.30	06.03	06.19	06.23	06.26	11.08	11.10	11.12	11.14	11.19	11.21	1999	Total
Asako Takakura	73(24)	-	-	-	-	-	-	-	-	O(2)	O(1)	O(2)	O	O	O	6(5)	79(29)
Homare Sawa	45(25)	O	O	O	O	O	O	O	O	-	-	-	-	-	-	8(0)	53(25)
Rie Yamaki	45(3)	-	-	O	O	O	-	O	O	-	-	-	-	-	-	5(0)	50(3)
Tamaki Uchiyama	44(22)	O	O	O	O(1)	O(1)	O	O	O	O(1)	O	O(1)	O	O	O	14(4)	58(26)
Yumi Tomei	37(6)	-	-	O	O	O	O	O	O	-	-	-	-	-	-	6(0)	43(6)
Nami Otake	36(18)	O	O	O	-	O(1)	O(1)	O	O	O(4)	O(3)	-	-	-	O(2)	10(11)	46(29)
Kae Nishina	36(1)	O	-	-	O	O	O	O	O	-	-	-	-	-	-	6(0)	42(1)
Yumi Obe	32(2)	-	-	-	-	-	-	-	-	O	O(1)	O(1)	O	O	O	6(2)	38(4)
Tomomi Mitsui	16(3)	O	O	O	O	O	O	O	O	O	O	O(2)	O	O	O	14(2)	30(5)
Tomoe Sakai	16(0)	O	O	O	O	O	O	O	-	O	O	O	O	O	O	13(0)	29(0)
Hiromi Isozaki	15(0)	O	O	O	O	O	O	O	O	-	-	-	-	-	-	8(0)	23(0)
Nozomi Yamago	14(0)	O	O	-	-	-	O	O	O	O	O	-	O	O	O	10(0)	24(0)
Mayumi Omatsu	11(1)	-	-	-	O	-	-	-	-	-	-	-	-	-	-	1(0)	12(1)
Shiho Onodera	10(0)	-	-	-	O	-	-	-	-	-	-	-	-	-	-	1(0)	11(0)
Mito Isaka	7(3)	O	O	O	O	O	O	O	O	O(1)	O	O(1)	O(3)	O	O	14(5)	21(8)
Mai Nakachi	7(0)	O	O	O	-	-	-	-	-	-	-	-	-	-	-	3(0)	10(0)
Kazumi Kishi	5(2)	-	-	O	-	-	-	-	-	-	-	-	-	-	-	1(0)	6(2)
Yasuyo Yamagishi	4(1)	-	-	-	-	-	-	-	-	O(1)	O	O(1)	O(1)	O	-	5(3)	9(4)
Miyuki Yanagita	3(2)	O	O	O	O	O	-	O	O	-	-	-	-	-	-	7(0)	10(2)
Ayumi Hara	3(0)	-	-	O	O	O	O	O	O	O	O	O	O(1)	O	O	12(1)	15(1)
Rie Kimura	2(0)	-	-	-	-	-	-	-	-	O	O	O	O	O	O	6(0)	8(0)
Tomomi Fujimura	1(0)	-	-	-	-	-	-	-	-	O	O	O	O	O	O	6(0)	7(0)
Kaoru Nagadome	1(0)	O	O	-	-	O	-	-	-	-	-	-	-	-	-	3(0)	4(0)
Yayoi Kobayashi	0(0)	O(1)	O	O	O	O(1)	O	O	O	-	-	-	-	-	-	8(2)	8(2)
Yoshie Kasajima	0(0)	-	-	-	-	-	-	-	-	O	O	O(1)	-	O	O	5(1)	5(1)
Megumi Torigoe	0(0)	-	-	-	-	-	-	-	-	O	O	-	O	O	O	5(0)	5(0)
Mai Aizawa	0(0)	-	-	-	-	-	-	-	-	-	-	O(3)	O(1)	-	O	3(4)	3(4)
Shoko Mikami	0(0)	-	-	-	-	-	-	-	-	-	-	O(2)	O	O	-	3(2)	3(2)
Naoko Nishigai	0(0)	-	-	O	-	O	-	-	-	-	-	-	-	-	-	2(0)	2(0)
Kozue Ando	0(0)	-	-	-	-	-	-	-	O	-	-	-	-	-	-	1(0)	1(0)
Mari Miyamoto	0(0)	-	-	-	-	-	-	-	-	-	-	O	-	-	-	1(0)	1(0)
