= 1998 in Japanese football =

1998 season

The following describes Japanese football in 1998.

== Japan Football League ==
Pos	Team	Pld	W	OTW	PKW	L	GF	GA	GD	Pts	Promotion
1	Tokyo Gas (C)	30	21	3	0	6	67	17	+50	69	Formed J.League Division 2
2	Kawasaki Frontale	30	22	1	0	7	72	24	+48	68	J.League Division 1 Pro/Rele Series
3	Montedio Yamagata	30	20	2	0	8	69	38	+31	64	Formed J.League Division 2
4	Ventforet Kofu	30	16	5	1	8	74	40	+34	59	Formed J.League Division 2
5	Honda Motors	30	16	3	0	11	57	45	+12	54	Formed new Japan Football League
6	Oita Trinity	30	14	1	1	14	51	51	0	45	Formed J.League Division 2
7	Brummell Sendai	30	10	5	3	12	55	53	+2	43	Formed J.League Division 2
8	Sagan Tosu	30	11	3	0	16	40	55	−15	39	Formed J.League Division 2
9	Otsuka FC Vortis Tokushima	30	11	2	1	16	58	48	+10	38	Formed new Japan Football League
10	Denso SC	30	11	2	1	16	48	59	−11	38	Formed new Japan Football League
11	Albirex Niigata	30	10	2	0	18	39	47	−8	34	Formed J.League Division 2
12	Omiya Ardija	30	9	2	0	19	51	56	−5	31	Formed J.League Division 2
13	Sony Sendai	30	7	1	0	22	42	71	−29	23	Formed new Japan Football League
14	Mito HollyHock	30	7	1	0	22	37	69	−32	23	Formed new Japan Football League
15	Kokushikan University	30	5	3	0	22	42	76	−34	21	Formed new Japan Football League
16	Jatco SC	30	4	3	0	23	44	97	−53	18	Formed new Japan Football League

Updated to match(es) played on November 1998. Source: Montedio Yamagata website
Rules for classification: 1) points; 2) goal difference; 3) number of goals scored.
(C) Champion

== National team (Men) ==
=== Results ===
1998.02.15	Japan	3–0	Australia	Adelaide, Australia
	Nakata 5'; Hirano 65', 70'	JFA

1998.03.01	Japan	2–1	South Korea	Kanagawa, Japan
	Nakayama 18'; Jo 89'	JFA	? (?)	Stadium: International Stadium Yokohama; Attendance: 59,380

1998.03.07	Japan	0–2	China PR	Tokyo, Japan
		JFA	? (?) ? (?)	Stadium: Tokyo National Stadium; Attendance: 53,226

1998.04.01	Japan	1–2	South Korea	Seoul, South Korea
	Nakayama 61'	JFA	? (?) ? (?)

1998.05.17	Japan	1–1	Paraguay	Tokyo, Japan
	Soma 86'	JFA	? (?)	Stadium: Tokyo National Stadium; Attendance: 53,408

1998.05.24	Japan	0–0	Czech Republic	Kanagawa, Japan
		JFA		Stadium: International Stadium Yokohama; Attendance: 66,930

1998.06.03	Japan	0–1	Yugoslavia	Lausanne, Switzerland
		JFA	? (?)

1998.06.14	Japan	0–1	Argentina	Toulouse, France
		JFA	? (?)	Attendance: 33,500

1998.06.20	Japan	0–1	Croatia	Nantes, France
		JFA	? (?)	Attendance: 35,500

1998.06.26	Japan	1–2	Jamaica	Lyon, France
	Nakayama 74'	JFA	? (?) ? (?)	Attendance: 39,100

1998.10.28	Japan	1–0	Egypt	Osaka, Japan
	Nakayama 25'	JFA		Stadium: Osaka Nagai Stadium; Attendance: 47,996

=== Players statistics ===
Player	-1997	02.15	03.01	03.07	04.01	05.17	05.24	06.03	06.14	06.20	06.26	10.28	1998	Total
Masami Ihara	109(5)	O	O	O	O	O	O	-	O	O	O	O	10(0)	119(5)
Kazuyoshi Miura	83(53)	-	-	O	-	-	-	-	-	-	-	-	1(0)	84(53)
Tsuyoshi Kitazawa	54(3)	-	O	O	O	-	-	-	-	-	-	-	3(0)	57(3)
Motohiro Yamaguchi	49(4)	O	-	O	O	O	O	O	O	O	O	-	9(0)	58(4)
Naoki Soma	43(3)	-	O	O	O	O(1)	O	O	O	O	O	O	10(1)	53(4)
Hiroshi Nanami	36(6)	O	O	O	O	O	O	O	O	O	O	O	11(0)	47(6)
Hiroaki Morishima	34(7)	-	-	-	-	O	-	-	-	O	-	O	3(0)	37(7)
Norio Omura	26(4)	-	-	-	O	O	-	O	-	-	O	-	4(0)	30(4)
Akira Narahashi	23(0)	O	O	O	-	O	O	O	O	O	O	-	9(0)	32(0)
Masashi Nakayama	21(10)	-	O(1)	O	O(1)	O	O	O	O	O	O(1)	O(1)	10(4)	31(14)
Yoshikatsu Kawaguchi	21(0)	-	-	O	O	O	O	O	O	O	O	O	9(0)	30(0)
Yutaka Akita	20(3)	O	O	O	O	O	-	O	O	O	O	O	10(0)	30(3)
Masayuki Okano	19(2)	-	O	O	O	-	-	O	-	O	-	-	5(0)	24(2)
Shoji Jo	17(4)	O	O(1)	O	-	O	O	O	O	O	O	O	10(1)	27(5)
Hidetoshi Nakata	16(5)	O(1)	O	O	O	-	O	O	O	O	O	O	10(1)	26(6)
Tadashi Nakamura	15(0)	O	-	-	-	-	-	-	-	-	-	-	1(0)	16(0)
Toshihide Saito	9(0)	-	-	-	-	O	O	O	-	-	-	O	4(0)	13(0)
Wagner Lopes	6(3)	O	-	-	-	O	O	-	O	O	O	O	7(0)	13(3)
Takashi Hirano	5(1)	O(2)	O	-	O	O	-	O	O	-	O	-	7(2)	12(3)
Eisuke Nakanishi	5(0)	-	-	-	O	-	O	O	O	O	-	O	6(0)	11(0)
Toshihiro Hattori	2(0)	O	O	O	-	-	-	O	-	-	-	O	5(0)	7(0)
Shigeyoshi Mochizuki	2(0)	-	-	-	-	-	-	-	-	-	-	O	1(0)	3(0)
Teruyoshi Ito	1(0)	-	-	-	-	O	-	-	-	-	-	-	1(0)	2(0)
Shinji Ono	0(0)	-	-	-	O	-	O	-	-	-	O	-	3(0)	3(0)
Seigo Narazaki	0(0)	O	O	-	-	-	-	-	-	-	-	-	2(0)	2(0)
Atsushi Yanagisawa	0(0)	O	-	-	O	-	-	-	-	-	-	-	2(0)	2(0)
Tadatoshi Masuda	0(0)	O	-	-	-	-	-	-	-	-	-	-	1(0)	1(0)
Daisuke Ichikawa	0(0)	-	-	-	O	-	-	-	-	-	-	-	1(0)	1(0)
Daisuke Oku	0(0)	-	-	-	-	-	-	-	-	-	-	O	1(0)	1(0)
Tatsuhiko Kubo	0(0)	-	-	-	-	-	-	-	-	-	-	O	1(0)	1(0)

== National team (Women) ==
=== Results ===
1998.05.17	Japan	1–2	United States	Tokyo, Japan
	Otake (?)		? (?) ? (?)	Stadium: National Stadium

1998.05.21	Japan	0–2	United States	Hyogo, Japan
			? (?) ? (?)	Stadium: Kobe Universiade Memorial Stadium

1998.05.24	Japan	0–3	United States	Kanagawa, Japan
			? (?) ? (?) ? (?)	Stadium: International Stadium Yokohama

1998.10.24	Japan	1–1	South Korea	South Korea
	Otake (?)		? (?)

1998.10.26	Japan	1–1	South Korea	South Korea
	Sugawara (?)		? (?)

1998.12.08	Japan	6–0	Thailand	Thailand
	Sawa (?); Mitsui (?); Otake (?); Uchiyama (?); Isaka (?)

1998.12.10	Japan	2–3	North Korea	Thailand
	Otake (?); Isaka (?)		? (?) ? (?) ? (?)

1998.12.12	Japan	8–0	Vietnam	Thailand
	Sawa (?); Isaka (?); Yamagishi (?); Kishi (?); Sugawara (?)

1998.12.15	Japan	0–3	China	Thailand
			? (?) ? (?) ? (?)

1998.12.17	Japan	2–1	Chinese Taipei	Thailand
	Yamaki (?); Otake (?)		? (?)

=== Players statistics ===
Player	-1997	05.17	05.21	05.24	10.24	10.26	12.08	12.10	12.12	12.15	12.17	1998	Total
Rie Yamaki	37(2)	O	O	O	-	-	O	O	O	O	O(1)	8(1)	45(3)
Homare Sawa	35(21)	O	O	O	O	O	O(1)	O	O(3)	O	O	10(4)	45(25)
Tamaki Uchiyama	34(20)	O	O	O	O	O	O(2)	O	O	O	O	10(2)	44(22)
Yumi Tomei	31(6)	O	-	-	O	O	-	-	O	O	O	6(0)	37(6)
Nami Otake	27(13)	O(1)	O	O	O(1)	-	O(1)	O(1)	O	O	O(1)	9(5)	36(18)
Yumi Obe	27(2)	-	-	-	O	O	O	O	-	O	-	5(0)	32(2)
Kae Nishina	26(1)	O	O	O	O	O	O	O	O	O	O	10(0)	36(1)
Yuko Morimoto	8(2)	-	O	O	-	-	-	-	-	-	-	2(0)	10(2)
Shiho Onodera	8(0)	-	-	-	-	O	-	-	O	-	-	2(0)	10(0)
Tomoe Sakai	7(0)	O	O	O	O	O	O	O	-	O	O	9(0)	16(0)
Tomomi Mitsui	6(2)	O	O	O	O	O	O(1)	O	O	O	O	10(1)	16(3)
Mayumi Omatsu	6(1)	O	O	O	O	O	-	-	-	-	-	5(0)	11(1)
Hiromi Isozaki	6(0)	O	O	O	-	O	O	O	O	O	O	9(0)	15(0)
Nozomi Yamago	6(0)	O	O	O	O	-	O	O	-	O	O	8(0)	14(0)
Yumi Umeoka	3(0)	-	O	-	-	-	-	-	-	-	-	1(0)	4(0)
Mai Nakachi	2(0)	-	O	O	O	-	-	-	O	O	-	5(0)	7(0)
Mito Isaka	1(0)	-	-	-	O	-	O(1)	O(1)	O(1)	O	O	6(3)	7(3)
Miki Sugawara	0(0)	O	O	O	-	O(1)	O	O	O(1)	-	-	7(2)	7(2)
Kazumi Kishi	0(0)	-	O	O	-	O	O	-	O(2)	-	-	5(2)	5(2)
Yasuyo Yamagishi	0(0)	-	-	-	-	-	O	-	O(1)	O	O	4(1)	4(1)
Ayumi Hara	0(0)	O	O	O	-	-	-	-	-	-	-	3(0)	3(0)

== Births ==
- 5 March: Kaina Tanimura
