= 1997 in Japanese football =

1997 season

Japanese football in 1997

== Japan Football League ==
| Pos | Team | Pld | W | OTW | PKW | L | GF | GA | GD | Pts | Promotion |
|---|---|---|---|---|---|---|---|---|---|---|---|
| 1 | Consadole Sapporo (C, P) | 30 | 24 | 2 | 0 | 4 | 77 | 26 | +51 | 76 | Promoted to 1998 J.League |
| 2 | Tokyo Gas | 30 | 21 | 2 | 1 | 6 | 70 | 30 | +40 | 68 | |
| 3 | Kawasaki Frontale | 30 | 21 | 2 | 0 | 7 | 87 | 36 | +51 | 67 | |
| 4 | Honda Motors | 30 | 20 | 2 | 1 | 7 | 60 | 37 | +23 | 65 | |
| 5 | Montedio Yamagata | 30 | 18 | 1 | 0 | 11 | 57 | 36 | +21 | 56 | |
| 6 | Ventforet Kofu | 30 | 15 | 3 | 1 | 11 | 59 | 41 | +18 | 52 | |
| 7 | Otsuka FC Vortis Tokushima | 30 | 13 | 1 | 0 | 16 | 50 | 45 | +5 | 41 | |
| 8 | Brummell Sendai | 30 | 12 | 1 | 2 | 15 | 37 | 43 | −6 | 40 | |
| 9 | NTT Kanto | 30 | 11 | 3 | 0 | 16 | 48 | 49 | −1 | 39 | |
| 10 | Fukushima FC | 30 | 12 | 1 | 0 | 17 | 48 | 59 | −11 | 38 | Folded (Note: After the season Fukushima FC has folded due to financial difficulties.) |
| 11 | Sagan Tosu | 30 | 12 | 1 | 0 | 17 | 38 | 54 | −16 | 38 | |
| 12 | Oita Trinity | 30 | 7 | 4 | 0 | 19 | 42 | 64 | −22 | 29 | |
| 13 | Denso | 30 | 7 | 2 | 2 | 19 | 29 | 49 | −20 | 27 | |
| 14 | Seino Transportation | 30 | 5 | 0 | 0 | 25 | 24 | 67 | −43 | 15 | Folded (Note: Seino Transportation SC were disbanded by parent company after the season.) |
| 15 | Jatco SC | 30 | 2 | 1 | 3 | 24 | 25 | 70 | −45 | 11 | |
| 16 | Mito HollyHock | 30 | 3 | 0 | 1 | 26 | 24 | 69 | −45 | 10 | |

Updated to match(es) played on November 1997. Source: Montedio Yamagata website
Rules for classification: 1) points; 2) goal difference; 3) number of goals scored.
(C) Champion; (P) Promoted

== National team (Men) ==
=== Results ===
| 1997.02.09 | Japan | 1–1 | Thailand | Bangkok, Thailand |
| | Jo 64' | JFA | ? (?) |

| 1997.02.13 | Japan | 0–1 | Sweden | Bangkok, Thailand |
| | | JFA | ? (?) |

| 1997.03.15 | Japan | 1–3 | Thailand | Bangkok, Thailand |
| | Miura 29' | JFA | ? (?) ? (?) ? (?) |

| 1997.03.23 | Japan | 1–0 | Oman | Muscat, Oman |
| | Omura 10' | JFA |

| 1997.03.25 | Japan | 10–0 | Macau | Muscat, Oman |
| | Takagi 13', 33', 71'; Soma 44'; Miura 53', 89'; Nanami 67'; Morishima 78', 81', 89' | JFA |

| 1997.03.27 | Japan | 6–0 | Nepal | Muscat, Oman |
| | Jo 23'; Takagi 46', 54', 89'; Omura 76'; Honda 79' | JFA |

| 1997.05.21 | Japan | 1–1 | South Korea | Tokyo, Japan |
| | Miura 88' | JFA | ? (?) | Stadium: Tokyo National Stadium |

| 1997.06.08 | Japan | 4–3 | Croatia | Tokyo, Japan |
| | Hirano 34'; Miura 49', 53'; Morishima 89' | JFA | ? (?) ? (?) ? (?) | Stadium: Tokyo National Stadium |

| 1997.06.15 | Japan | 1–0 | Turkey | Osaka, Japan |
| | Morishima 25' | JFA | | Stadium: Osaka Nagai Stadium |

| 1997.06.22 | Japan | 10–0 | Macau | Tokyo, Japan |
| | Nakata 17', 61'; Nishizawa 20'; Miura 23', 29', 44', 57', 62', 79'; Nanami 42' | JFA | | Stadium: Tokyo National Stadium |

| 1997.06.25 | Japan | 3–0 | Nepal | Tokyo, Japan |
| | Nishizawa 44'; Miura 72', 87' | JFA | | Stadium: Tokyo National Stadium |

| 1997.06.28 | Japan | 1–1 | Oman | Tokyo, Japan |
| | Nakata 4' | JFA | ? (?) | Stadium: Tokyo National Stadium |

| 1997.08.13 | Japan | 0–3 | Brazil | Osaka, Japan |
| | | JFA | ? (?) ? (?) ? (?) | Stadium: Osaka Nagai Stadium; Attendance: 45,754 |

| 1997.09.07 | Japan | 6–3 | Uzbekistan | Tokyo, Japan |
| | Miura 4', 23', 64', 80'; Nakata 40'; Jo 44' | JFA | ? (?) ? (?) ? (?) | Stadium: Tokyo National Stadium; Attendance: 54,328 |

| 1997.09.19 | Japan | 0–0 | United Arab Emirates | Abu Dhabi, United Arab Emirates |
| | | JFA |

| 1997.09.28 | Japan | 1–2 | South Korea | Tokyo, Japan |
| | Yamaguchi 67' | JFA | ? (?) ? (?) | Stadium: Tokyo National Stadium; Attendance: 56,704 |

| 1997.10.04 | Japan | 1–1 | Kazakhstan | Almaty, Kazakhstan |
| | Akita 23' | JFA | ? (?) |

| 1997.10.11 | Japan | 1–1 | Uzbekistan | Tashkent, Uzbekistan |
| | Lopes 90' | JFA | ? (?) |

| 1997.10.26 | Japan | 1–1 | United Arab Emirates | Tokyo, Japan |
| | Lopes 3' | JFA | ? (?) | Stadium: Tokyo National Stadium; Attendance: 56,089 |

| 1997.11.01 | Japan | 2–0 | South Korea | Seoul, South Korea |
| | Nanami 1'; Lopes 37' | JFA | | Attendance: 80,000 |

| 1997.11.08 | Japan | 5–1 | Kazakhstan | Tokyo, Japan |
| | Akita 12'; Nakata 16'; Nakayama 44'; Ihara 67'; Takagi 79' | JFA | ? (?) | Stadium: Tokyo National Stadium; Attendance: 56,032 |

| 1997.11.16 | Japan | 3–2 (a.e.t.) (GG) | Iran | Johor Bahru, Malaysia |
| | Nakayama 39'; Jo 76'; Okano 118' | JFA | ? (?) ? (?) | Attendance: 22,000 |

=== Players statistics ===
| Player | -1996 | 02.09 | 02.13 | 03.15 | 03.23 | 03.25 | 03.27 | 05.21 | 06.08 | 06.15 | 06.22 | 06.25 | 06.28 | 08.13 | 09.07 | 09.19 | 09.28 | 10.04 | 10.11 | 10.26 | 11.01 | 11.08 | 11.16 | 1997 | Total |
| Masami Ihara | 88(4) | O | O | O | O | O | O | O | O | O | O | O | O | O | O | O | O | O | O | - | O | O(1) | O | 21(1) | 109(5) |
| Kazuyoshi Miura | 64(35) | O | - | O(1) | O | O(2) | - | O(1) | O(2) | O | O(6) | O(2) | O | O | O(4) | O | O | O | O | O | O | - | O | 19(18) | 83(53) |
| Tsuyoshi Kitazawa | 43(3) | O | O | O | - | O | O | - | - | O | - | O | - | - | - | - | - | - | - | O | O | O | O | 11(0) | 54(3) |
| Takuya Takagi | 39(20) | - | - | O | - | O(3) | O(3) | - | - | - | - | - | - | O | - | - | - | - | - | - | - | O(1) | - | 5(7) | 44(27) |
| Motohiro Yamaguchi | 27(3) | O | O | O | O | O | O | O | O | O | O | O | O | O | O | O | O(1) | O | O | O | O | O | O | 22(1) | 49(4) |
| Hiroshige Yanagimoto | 25(0) | - | O | O | O | O | O | - | - | - | - | - | - | - | - | - | - | - | - | - | - | - | - | 5(0) | 30(0) |
| Hisashi Kurosaki | 23(4) | - | O | - | - | - | - | - | - | - | - | - | - | - | - | - | - | - | - | - | - | - | - | 1(0) | 24(4) |
| Naoki Soma | 22(2) | O | - | O | O | O(1) | O | O | O | O | O | O | O | O | O | O | O | O | O | O | O | O | O | 21(1) | 43(3) |
| Hiroaki Morishima | 20(2) | O | O | O | O | O(3) | O | O | O(1) | O(1) | O | O | - | - | - | O | - | - | O | - | - | O | - | 14(5) | 34(7) |
| Masashi Nakayama | 19(8) | - | - | - | - | - | - | - | - | - | - | - | - | - | - | - | - | - | - | - | - | O(1) | O(1) | 2(2) | 21(10) |
| Masakiyo Maezono | 17(4) | O | - | O | - | - | - | - | - | - | - | - | - | - | - | - | - | - | - | - | - | - | - | 2(0) | 19(4) |
| Norio Omura | 16(2) | O | - | O | O(1) | O | O(1) | O | - | - | - | - | - | - | O | O | O | O | - | - | - | - | - | 10(2) | 26(4) |
| Hiroshi Nanami | 15(3) | O | O | O | O | O(1) | O | O | O | O | O(1) | O | O | - | O | O | O | O | O | O | O(1) | O | O | 21(3) | 36(6) |
| Yasuto Honda | 15(0) | - | O | - | O | O | O(1) | O | O | - | O | O | - | O | O | O | O | O | - | O | - | - | - | 14(1) | 29(1) |
| Masayuki Okano | 14(1) | - | O | - | - | O | O | - | - | - | - | - | O | - | - | - | - | - | - | - | - | - | O(1) | 5(1) | 19(2) |
| Akira Narahashi | 10(0) | - | - | - | - | - | - | - | - | O | O | O | - | O | O | O | O | O | O | O | O | O | O | 13(0) | 23(0) |
| Kenichi Shimokawa | 8(0) | O | - | - | - | - | - | - | - | - | - | - | - | - | - | - | - | - | - | - | - | - | - | 1(0) | 9(0) |
| Tadashi Nakamura | 7(0) | O | - | O | - | - | O | O | O | O | O | - | O | - | - | - | - | - | - | - | - | - | - | 8(0) | 15(0) |
| Yutaka Akita | 4(1) | - | O | - | - | - | - | - | O | O | O | O | O | O | O | O | O | O(1) | O | O | O | O(1) | O | 16(2) | 20(3) |
| Shoji Jo | 4(0) | O(1) | O | O | O | - | O(1) | O | - | - | - | - | - | O | O(1) | O | - | - | O | O | - | O | O(1) | 13(4) | 17(4) |
| Toshihide Saito | 2(0) | - | - | - | - | - | - | O | O | O | - | - | O | O | - | - | - | - | O | O | - | - | - | 7(0) | 9(0) |
| Ryuji Michiki | 1(0) | - | O | - | - | - | - | O | - | - | - | - | - | O | - | - | - | - | - | - | - | - | - | 3(0) | 4(0) |
| Toshihiro Hattori | 1(0) | - | O | - | - | - | - | - | - | - | - | - | - | - | - | - | - | - | - | - | - | - | - | 1(0) | 2(0) |
| Yoshikatsu Kawaguchi | 0(0) | - | O | O | O | O | O | O | O | O | O | O | O | O | O | O | O | O | O | O | O | O | O | 21(0) | 21(0) |
| Hidetoshi Nakata | 0(0) | - | - | - | - | - | - | O | O | O | O(2) | O | O(1) | O | O(1) | O | O | O | O | O | O | O(1) | O | 16(5) | 16(5) |
| Wagner Lopes | 0(0) | - | - | - | - | - | - | - | - | - | - | - | - | - | - | - | O | O | O(1) | O(1) | O(1) | - | O | 6(3) | 6(3) |
| Akinori Nishizawa | 0(0) | - | - | - | - | - | - | O | - | - | O(1) | O(1) | - | - | O | - | O | - | - | - | - | - | - | 5(2) | 5(2) |
| Takashi Hirano | 0(0) | - | - | - | - | - | - | - | O(1) | - | O | - | O | O | - | - | - | - | - | - | O | - | - | 5(1) | 5(1) |
| Eisuke Nakanishi | 0(0) | - | - | - | - | - | - | - | - | - | - | - | - | - | O | O | O | - | O | - | - | O | - | 5(0) | 5(0) |
| Shigeyoshi Mochizuki | 0(0) | - | - | - | - | - | - | - | - | O | - | O | - | - | - | - | - | - | - | - | - | - | - | 2(0) | 2(0) |
| Teruyoshi Ito | 0(0) | - | - | - | - | - | - | - | O | - | - | - | - | - | - | - | - | - | - | - | - | - | - | 1(0) | 1(0) |
| Yasuyuki Moriyama | 0(0) | - | - | - | - | - | - | - | - | O | - | - | - | - | - | - | - | - | - | - | - | - | - | 1(0) | 1(0) |
| Hideto Suzuki | 0(0) | - | - | - | - | - | - | - | - | - | - | - | O | - | - | - | - | - | - | - | - | - | - | 1(0) | 1(0) |
| Takeshi Watanabe | 0(0) | - | - | - | - | - | - | - | - | - | - | - | - | O | - | - | - | - | - | - | - | - | - | 1(0) | 1(0) |

== National team (Women) ==
=== Results ===
| 1997.06.08 | Japan | 1–0 | China | Tokyo, Japan |
| | Mitsui (?) | | | Stadium: National Stadium |

| 1997.06.15 | Japan | 0–0 | China | Osaka, Japan |
| | | | | Stadium: Osaka Nagai Stadium |

| 1997.12.05 | Japan | 21–0 | Guam | China |
| | Nishina (?); Sawa (?); Morimoto (?); Yanagita (?); Omatsu (?); Otake (?); Uchiyama (?); Yamaki (?) |

| 1997.12.07 | Japan | 1–0 | India | China |
| | Sawa (?) |

| 1997.12.09 | Japan | 9–0 | Hong Kong | China |
| | Yamaki (?); Tomei (?); Sawa (?); Morimoto (?); Yanagita (?); Mitsui (?); Uchiyama (?) |

| 1997.12.12 | Japan | 0–1 | North Korea | China |
| | | | ? (?) |

| 1997.12.14 | Japan | 2–0 | Chinese Taipei | China |
| | Sawa (?) |

=== Players statistics ===
| Player | -1996 | 06.08 | 06.15 | 12.05 | 12.07 | 12.09 | 12.12 | 12.14 | 1997 | Total |
| Rie Yamaki | 30(0) | O | O | O(1) | O | O(1) | O | O | 7(2) | 37(2) |
| Maki Haneta | 29(1) | - | O | - | - | - | - | - | 1(0) | 30(1) |
| Tamaki Uchiyama | 28(16) | O | O | O(3) | O | O(1) | O | - | 6(4) | 34(20) |
| Homare Sawa | 28(8) | O | O | O(7) | O(1) | O(3) | O | O(2) | 7(13) | 35(21) |
| Yumi Tomei | 25(5) | O | O | O | O | O(1) | O | - | 6(1) | 31(6) |
| Yumi Obe | 23(2) | O | O | - | O | O | - | - | 4(0) | 27(2) |
| Nami Otake | 21(7) | O | O | O(6) | O | - | O | O | 6(6) | 27(13) |
| Junko Ozawa | 20(0) | O | - | - | - | - | - | - | 1(0) | 21(0) |
| Kae Nishina | 19(0) | O | O | O(1) | O | O | O | O | 7(1) | 26(1) |
| Yuko Morimoto | 3(0) | - | - | O(1) | O | O(1) | O | O | 5(2) | 8(2) |
| Tomoe Sakai | 0(0) | O | O | O | O | O | O | O | 7(0) | 7(0) |
| Tomomi Mitsui | 0(0) | O(1) | O | - | O | O(1) | O | O | 6(2) | 6(2) |
| Mayumi Omatsu | 0(0) | O | - | O(1) | O | O | O | O | 6(1) | 6(1) |
| Hiromi Isozaki | 0(0) | O | - | O | O | O | O | O | 6(0) | 6(0) |
| Nozomi Yamago | 0(0) | - | O | O | O | O | O | O | 6(0) | 6(0) |
| Miyuki Yanagita | 0(0) | - | - | O(1) | - | O(1) | O | - | 3(2) | 3(2) |
| Yumi Umeoka | 0(0) | - | O | O | - | O | - | - | 3(0) | 3(0) |
| Mai Nakachi | 0(0) | - | - | O | - | - | - | O | 2(0) | 2(0) |
| Mito Isaka | 0(0) | - | O | - | - | - | - | - | 1(0) | 1(0) |
| Kaoru Nagadome | 0(0) | - | O | - | - | - | - | - | 1(0) | 1(0) |
| Tomomi Fujimura | 0(0) | - | O | - | - | - | - | - | 1(0) | 1(0) |

== Births ==
- 20 May: Kaoru Mitoma
