= 1995 in Japanese football =

1995 season

Japanese football in 1995

== Japan Football League ==
Pos	Club	P	W	L	GF	GA	Pts	Notes
1	(Fukuoka Prefecture) Fukuoka Blux	30	24	6	83	25	72	Promoted to J.League
2	(Kyoto Prefecture) Kyoto Purple Sanga	30	23	7	74	38	70	Promoted to J.League
3	Tokyo Gas	30	20	7	66	35	61	
4	(Shizuoka Prefecture) Tosu Futures	30	19	11	47	37	60	
5	(Tokushima Prefecture) Otsuka Pharmaceutical	30	19	11	53	28	57	
6	(Hyōgo Prefecture) Vissel Kobe	30	18	12	53	36	55	
7	(Shizuoka Prefecture) Honda	30	16	14	58	42	49	
8	(Hokkaido) Toshiba	30	15	15	46	55	46	
9	(Yamanashi Prefecture) Ventforet Kofu	30	14	16	54	54	43	
10	(Yamagata Prefecture) NEC Yamagata	30	13	17	45	47	41	
11	(Mie Prefecture) Cosmo Oil	30	11	19	27	47	36	
12	(Kanagawa Prefecture) Fujitsu	30	11	19	45	61	34	
13	(Fukushima Prefecture) Fukushima	30	11	19	24	67	33	
14	(Saitama Prefecture) NTT Kanto	30	9	21	34	63	31	
15	(Miyagi Prefecture) Brummell Sendai	30	9	21	40	79	27	
16	(Gifu Prefecture) Seino Transportation	30	8	22	27	62	26	

== National team (Men) ==
=== Results ===
1995.01.06	Japan	0–3	Nigeria	Riyadh, Saudi Arabia
		JFA	? (?) ? (?) ? (?)

1995.01.08	Japan	1–5	Argentina	Riyadh, Saudi Arabia
	Miura 56'	JFA	? (?) ? (?) ? (?) ? (?) ? (?)

1995.02.15	Japan	1–2	Australia	Sydney, Australia
	Hasegawa 17'	JFA	? (?) ? (?)

1995.02.21	Japan	1–1	South Korea	Hong Kong
	Kurosaki 46'	JFA	? (?)

1995.02.23	Japan	2–1	China PR	Hong Kong
	Fujita 15'; Kurosaki 21'	JFA	? (?)

1995.02.26	Japan	2–2 (a.e.t.) (5–3 p)	South Korea	Hong Kong
	Fukuda 1'; M. Yamaguchi 86'	JFA	? (?) ? (?)

1995.05.21	Japan	0–0	Scotland	Hiroshima, Japan
		JFA		Stadium: Hiroshima Big Arch

1995.05.28	Japan	3–0	Ecuador	Tokyo, Japan
	Nakayama 36'; Miura 46', 53'	JFA		Stadium: Tokyo National Stadium

1995.06.03	Japan	1–2	England	London, England
	Ihara 62'	JFA	? (?) ? (?)

1995.06.06	Japan	0–3	Brazil	Liverpool, England
		JFA	? (?) ? (?) ? (?)

1995.06.10	Japan	2–2	Sweden	Nottingham, England
	Fujita 8'; Kurosaki 84'	JFA	? (?) ? (?)

1995.08.06	Japan	3–0	Costa Rica	Kyoto, Japan
	Nanami 44'; Fukuda 65'; Kitazawa 74'	JFA		Stadium: Nishikyogoku Athletic Stadium

1995.08.09	Japan	1–5	Brazil	Tokyo, Japan
	Fukuda 48'	JFA	? (?) ? (?) ? (?) ? (?) ? (?)	Stadium: Tokyo National Stadium

1995.09.20	Japan	1–2	Paraguay	Tokyo, Japan
	Miura 23'	JFA	? (?) ? (?)	Stadium: Tokyo National Stadium

1995.10.24	Japan	2–1	Saudi Arabia	Tokyo, Japan
	Nanami 27'; Miura 54'	JFA	? (?)	Stadium: Tokyo National Stadium

1995.10.28	Japan	2–1	Saudi Arabia	Ehime, Japan
	Miura 82'; Akita 85'	JFA	? (?)	Stadium: Ehime Matsuyama Athletic Stadium

=== Players statistics ===
Player	-1994	01.06	01.08	02.15	02.21	02.23	02.26	05.21	05.28	06.03	06.06	06.10	08.06	08.09	09.20	10.24	10.28	1995	Total
Satoshi Tsunami	75(2)	O	O	-	O	-	-	-	-	-	-	-	-	-	-	-	-	3(0)	78(2)
Masami Ihara	59(3)	O	O	O	O	O	O	O	O	O(1)	O	O	O	O	O	O	O	16(1)	75(4)
Tetsuji Hashiratani	57(6)	O	O	O	O	O	O	O	O	O	-	O	O	O	O	O	O	15(0)	72(6)
Takumi Horiike	56(2)	O	O	-	-	-	-	-	-	-	-	-	-	-	-	-	-	2(0)	58(2)
Kazuyoshi Miura	40(23)	O	O(1)	-	-	-	-	O	O(2)	O	O	O	O	O	O(1)	O(1)	O(1)	12(6)	52(29)
Shigetatsu Matsunaga	34(0)	O	O	O	O	O	O	-	-	-	-	-	-	-	-	-	-	6(0)	40(0)
Masahiro Fukuda	30(6)	O	O	O	O	-	O(1)	O	O	O	O	O	O(1)	O(1)	O	O	O	15(3)	45(9)
Ruy Ramos	29(1)	O	-	-	-	-	-	O	-	-	-	-	-	O	-	-	-	3(0)	32(1)
Hajime Moriyasu	26(0)	-	-	O	O	O	O	-	-	-	O	O	-	-	-	-	-	6(0)	32(0)
Kenta Hasegawa	24(3)	-	-	O(1)	-	O	O	-	-	-	-	-	-	-	-	-	-	3(1)	27(4)
Tsuyoshi Kitazawa	24(2)	O	O	O	O	O	O	O	O	O	O	O	O(1)	O	O	-	-	14(1)	38(3)
Masashi Nakayama	15(7)	-	-	-	-	-	-	O	O(1)	O	O	-	-	-	-	-	-	4(1)	19(8)
Hisashi Kurosaki	11(1)	-	-	O	O(1)	O(1)	O	-	O	O	O	O(1)	O	O	-	-	-	10(3)	21(4)
Yoshihiro Natsuka	9(1)	O	O	-	-	-	-	-	-	-	-	-	-	-	-	-	-	2(0)	11(1)
Kazuya Maekawa	7(0)	-	-	-	-	-	-	O	O	O	-	-	-	-	O	O	-	5(0)	12(0)
Masakiyo Maezono	6(0)	-	-	O	O	O	-	-	-	-	-	-	-	-	O	-	-	4(0)	10(0)
Shinkichi Kikuchi	5(0)	-	-	O	-	-	-	-	-	-	-	-	-	-	-	-	O	2(0)	7(0)
Toshihiro Yamaguchi	2(0)	O	O	-	-	-	-	-	-	-	-	-	-	-	-	-	-	2(0)	4(0)
Akira Narahashi	1(0)	-	-	O	-	-	O	O	O	O	O	O	O	-	O	-	-	9(0)	10(0)
Motohiro Yamaguchi	0(0)	O	O	O	O	O	O(1)	O	O	O	O	O	O	O	O	-	-	14(1)	14(1)
Hiroshige Yanagimoto	0(0)	-	O	O	O	O	O	O	-	O	-	O	O	O	-	O	O	12(0)	12(0)
Hiroaki Morishima	0(0)	-	-	-	-	-	-	O	O	O	O	-	O	O	O	O	O	9(0)	9(0)
Naoki Soma	0(0)	-	-	-	-	-	-	-	O	O	O	O	O	O	O	O	O	9(0)	9(0)
Toshiya Fujita	0(0)	-	-	O	-	O(1)	-	-	-	-	-	O(1)	O	-	-	O	O	6(2)	6(2)
Yoshiyuki Hasegawa	0(0)	-	-	O	O	O	O	-	-	-	-	-	-	-	-	-	-	4(0)	4(0)
Norio Omura	0(0)	-	-	-	-	-	-	O	-	-	O	O	-	-	O	-	-	4(0)	4(0)
Kazuaki Tasaka	0(0)	-	-	-	-	-	-	-	O	O	O	-	-	-	-	O	-	4(0)	4(0)
Tadashi Nakamura	0(0)	-	-	O	-	O	O	-	-	-	-	-	-	-	-	-	-	3(0)	3(0)
Nobuyuki Kojima	0(0)	-	-	-	-	-	-	-	-	-	O	-	O	O	-	-	-	3(0)	3(0)
Masayuki Okano	0(0)	-	-	-	-	-	-	-	-	-	-	-	-	-	O	O	O	3(0)	3(0)
Hiroshi Nanami	0(0)	-	-	-	-	-	-	-	-	-	-	-	O(1)	-	-	O(1)	-	2(2)	2(2)
Yutaka Akita	0(0)	-	-	-	-	-	-	-	-	-	-	-	-	-	-	O	O(1)	2(1)	2(1)
Hiromitsu Isogai	0(0)	O	O	-	-	-	-	-	-	-	-	-	-	-	-	-	-	2(0)	2(0)
Kentaro Hayashi	0(0)	-	-	-	-	-	-	-	-	-	-	-	O	O	-	-	-	2(0)	2(0)
Kentaro Sawada	0(0)	-	-	-	-	-	-	-	-	-	-	-	-	-	O	-	O	2(0)	2(0)
Yasuto Honda	0(0)	-	-	-	-	-	-	-	-	-	-	-	-	-	-	O	O	2(0)	2(0)
Katsuo Kanda	0(0)	-	-	-	-	-	-	-	O	-	-	-	-	-	-	-	-	1(0)	1(0)
Kenichi Shimokawa	0(0)	-	-	-	-	-	-	-	-	-	-	O	-	-	-	-	-	1(0)	1(0)
Koji Noguchi	0(0)	-	-	-	-	-	-	-	-	-	-	-	O	-	-	-	-	1(0)	1(0)
Shoji Jo	0(0)	-	-	-	-	-	-	-	-	-	-	-	-	-	O	-	-	1(0)	1(0)
Masaharu Suzuki	0(0)	-	-	-	-	-	-	-	-	-	-	-	-	-	-	O	-	1(0)	1(0)

== National team (Women) ==
=== Results ===
1995.05.05	Japan	1–0	Canada	Tokyo, Japan
	Otake (?)			Stadium: Nishigaoka Soccer Stadium

1995.06.05	Japan	0–1	Germany	Sweden
			? (?)

1995.06.07	Japan	2–1	Brazil	Sweden
	Noda (?)		? (?)

1995.06.09	Japan	0–2	Sweden	Sweden
			? (?) ? (?)

1995.06.13	Japan	0–4	United States	Sweden
			? (?) ? (?) ? (?) ? (?)

1995.09.22	Japan	1–0	South Korea	Malaysia
	Noda (?)

1995.09.25	Japan	6–0	India	Malaysia
	Obe (?); Otake (?); Takeoka (?); Nagamine (?)

1995.09.27	Japan	17–0	Uzbekistan	Malaysia
	Tomei (?); Otake (?); Noda (?); Takeoka (?); Uchiyama (?)

1995.09.30	Japan	3–0	Chinese Taipei	Malaysia
	Tomei (?); Noda (?); Uchiyama (?)

1995.10.02	Japan	0–2	China	Malaysia
			? (?) ? (?)

=== Players statistics ===
Player	-1994	05.05	06.05	06.07	06.09	06.13	09.22	09.25	09.27	09.30	10.02	1995	Total
Futaba Kioka	61(29)	O	O	O	O	O	O	-	O	O	O	9(0)	70(29)
Etsuko Handa	61(19)	O	O	-	O	O	-	O	O	O	-	7(0)	68(19)
Kaori Nagamine	58(46)	O	O	-	-	-	O	O(2)	-	O	-	5(2)	63(48)
Akemi Noda	57(15)	O	O	O(2)	O	O	O(1)	-	O(4)	O(1)	O	9(8)	66(23)
Asako Takakura	54(24)	O	O	O	O	O	O	-	O	O	O	9(0)	63(24)
Maki Haneta	12(1)	O	O	O	O	O	-	-	O	O	O	8(0)	20(1)
Tamaki Uchiyama	11(4)	O	O	O	O	O	O	-	O(8)	O(1)	O	9(9)	20(13)
Homare Sawa	10(5)	O	O	O	O	-	O	-	O	O	O	8(0)	18(5)
Rie Yamaki	10(0)	O	O	O	O	O	O	O	O	O	O	10(0)	20(0)
Junko Ozawa	10(0)	O	O	O	O	O	-	-	-	-	-	5(0)	15(0)
Yumi Tomei	8(2)	O	O	-	-	O	O	O	O(2)	O(1)	O	8(3)	16(5)
Megumi Sakata	8(0)	-	-	-	-	-	-	O	-	-	-	1(0)	9(0)
Nami Otake	6(3)	O(1)	-	O	O	O	-	O(1)	O(2)	O	O	8(4)	14(7)
Kaoru Kadohara	6(1)	-	-	-	-	-	O	O	-	-	-	2(0)	8(1)
Tsuru Morimoto	4(1)	-	-	-	-	-	-	O	-	-	-	1(0)	5(1)
Yumi Obe	3(0)	O	O	O	O	O	O	O(1)	O	O	O	10(1)	13(1)
Inesu Emiko Takeoka	1(0)	-	-	-	-	-	-	O(2)	O(1)	-	-	2(3)	3(3)
Kae Nishina	0(0)	O	O	O	O	O	O	O	O	O	-	9(0)	9(0)
Shiho Onodera	0(0)	-	-	-	-	-	O	-	O	O	O	4(0)	4(0)

== Births ==
- 31 May: Koki Anzai
