= 1994 in Japanese football =

1994 season

Japanese football in 1994

== J.League ==
| Pos | Team | Pld | W | L | GF | GA | GD | Qualification |
|---|---|---|---|---|---|---|---|---|
| 1 | Verdy Kawasaki | 44 | 31 | 13 | 91 | 47 | +44 | 1995–96 Asian Club Championship |
| 2 | Sanfrecce Hiroshima | 44 | 29 | 15 | 71 | 57 | +14 | |
| 3 | Kashima Antlers | 44 | 27 | 17 | 89 | 68 | +21 | |
| 4 | Shimizu S-Pulse | 44 | 27 | 17 | 69 | 56 | +13 | |
| 5 | Bellmare Hiratsuka | 44 | 23 | 21 | 75 | 80 | −5 | 1995–96 Asian Cup Winners' Cup |
| 6 | Yokohama Marinos | 44 | 22 | 22 | 73 | 61 | +12 | |
| 7 | Yokohama Flügels | 44 | 22 | 22 | 67 | 60 | +7 | |
| 8 | Júbilo Iwata | 44 | 20 | 24 | 56 | 69 | −13 | |
| 9 | JEF United Ichihara | 44 | 19 | 25 | 69 | 85 | −16 | |
| 10 | Gamba Osaka | 44 | 15 | 29 | 66 | 82 | −16 | |
| 11 | Nagoya Grampus Eight | 44 | 15 | 29 | 56 | 82 | −26 | |
| 12 | Urawa Red Diamonds | 44 | 14 | 30 | 59 | 94 | −35 | |

== Japan Football League ==
| Pos | Team | Pld | W | L | GF | GA | GD | Promotion |
|---|---|---|---|---|---|---|---|---|
| 1 | Cerezo Osaka | 30 | 26 | 4 | 85 | 33 | +52 | Promoted to J.League |
| 2 | Kashiwa Reysol | 30 | 25 | 5 | 82 | 29 | +53 | Promoted to J.League |
| 3 | Fujieda Blux | 30 | 24 | 6 | 61 | 32 | +29 | |
| 4 | PJM Futures | 30 | 22 | 8 | 70 | 47 | +23 | |
| 5 | Kyoto Purple Sanga | 30 | 20 | 10 | 63 | 47 | +16 | |
| 6 | Otsuka Pharmaceutical | 30 | 18 | 12 | 63 | 46 | +17 | |
| 7 | Tokyo Gas | 30 | 18 | 12 | 55 | 43 | +12 | |
| 8 | Kawasaki Steel | 30 | 13 | 17 | 36 | 46 | −10 | |
| 9 | Honda | 30 | 12 | 18 | 49 | 62 | −13 | |
| 10 | Fujitsu | 30 | 11 | 19 | 39 | 52 | −13 | |
| 11 | Toshiba | 30 | 11 | 19 | 56 | 71 | −15 | |
| 12 | NTT Kanto | 30 | 10 | 20 | 37 | 46 | −9 | |
| 13 | NEC Yamagata | 30 | 10 | 20 | 30 | 57 | −27 | |
| 14 | Kofu Club | 30 | 9 | 21 | 36 | 74 | −38 | |
| 15 | Cosmo Oil | 30 | 7 | 23 | 33 | 67 | −34 | |
| 16 | Seino Transportation | 30 | 4 | 26 | 29 | 72 | −43 | |

Source: RSSSF

== National team (Men) ==
=== Results ===
| 1994.05.22 | Japan | 1–1 | Australia | Hiroshima, Japan |
| | Asano 6' | JFA | ? (?) | Stadium: Hiroshima Big Arch |

| 1994.05.29 | Japan | 1–4 | France | Tokyo, Japan |
| | Ogura 78' | JFA | ? (?) ? (?) ? (?) ? (?) | Stadium: Tokyo National Stadium |

| 1994.07.08 | Japan | 3–2 | Ghana | Aichi, Japan |
| | Miura 10', 27'; Natsuka 72' | JFA | ? (?) ? (?) | Stadium: Mizuho Athletic Stadium |

| 1994.07.14 | Japan | 2–1 | Ghana | Hyōgo, Japan |
| | Iwamoto 23'; Miura 52' | JFA | ? (?) | Stadium: Kobe Universiade Memorial Stadium |

| 1994.09.27 | Japan | 0–0 | Australia | Tokyo, Japan |
| | | JFA | | Stadium: Tokyo National Stadium |

| 1994.10.03 | Japan | 1–1 | United Arab Emirates | Hiroshima, Japan |
| | Miura 66' | JFA | ? (?) | Stadium: Miyoshi Athletic Stadium |

| 1994.10.05 | Japan | 1–1 | Qatar | Hiroshima, Japan |
| | Takagi 56' | JFA | ? (?) | Stadium: Hiroshima Stadium |

| 1994.10.09 | Japan | 5–0 | Myanmar | Hiroshima, Japan |
| | Hashiratani 36'; Takagi 53'; Iwamoto 81'; Kitazawa 86'; Sawanobori 88' | JFA | | Stadium: Bingo Athletic Stadium |

| 1994.10.11 | Japan | 2–3 | South Korea | Hiroshima, Japan |
| | Miura 30'; Ihara 86' | JFA | ? (?) ? (?) ? (?) | Stadium: Hiroshima Stadium |

=== Players statistics ===
| Player | -1993 | 05.22 | 05.29 | 07.08 | 07.14 | 09.27 | 10.03 | 10.05 | 10.09 | 10.11 | 1994 | Total |
| Masami Ihara | 50(2) | O | O | O | O | O | O | O | O | O(1) | 9(1) | 59(3) |
| Tetsuji Hashiratani | 48(5) | O | O | O | O | O | O | O | O(1) | O | 9(1) | 57(6) |
| Kazuyoshi Miura | 32(18) | O | O | O(2) | O(1) | - | O(1) | O | O | O(1) | 8(5) | 40(23) |
| Takuya Takagi | 24(12) | - | - | - | O | - | O | O(1) | O(1) | O | 5(2) | 29(14) |
| Kenta Hasegawa | 22(3) | O | O | - | - | - | - | - | - | - | 2(0) | 24(3) |
| Hajime Moriyasu | 22(0) | O | O | O | O | - | - | - | - | - | 4(0) | 26(0) |
| Tsuyoshi Kitazawa | 17(1) | - | - | O | O | O | O | O | O(1) | O | 7(1) | 24(2) |
| Nobuhiro Takeda | 16(1) | - | - | - | - | O | O | - | - | - | 2(0) | 18(1) |
| Hisashi Kurosaki | 10(1) | - | O | - | - | - | - | - | - | - | 1(0) | 11(1) |
| Masaaki Sawanobori | 5(1) | O | O | - | - | O | O | - | O(1) | O | 6(1) | 11(2) |
| Tetsuya Asano | 5(0) | O(1) | O | - | O | - | - | - | - | - | 3(1) | 8(1) |
| Kazuya Maekawa | 5(0) | O | O | - | - | - | - | - | - | - | 2(0) | 7(0) |
| Teruo Iwamoto | 0(0) | O | O | O | O(1) | O | O | O | O(1) | O | 9(2) | 9(2) |
| Yoshihiro Natsuka | 0(0) | O | O | O(1) | O | O | O | O | O | O | 9(1) | 9(1) |
| Masahiro Endo | 0(0) | - | O | O | O | O | O | O | O | O | 8(0) | 8(0) |
| Yoshiro Moriyama | 0(0) | - | - | O | O | O | O | O | O | O | 7(0) | 7(0) |
| Masakiyo Maezono | 0(0) | O | - | - | - | O | O | O | O | O | 6(0) | 6(0) |
| Takafumi Ogura | 0(0) | O | O(1) | O | O | - | - | - | O | - | 5(1) | 5(1) |
| Shinkichi Kikuchi | 0(0) | - | - | - | - | O | O | O | O | O | 5(0) | 5(0) |
| Kenji Honnami | 0(0) | - | O | O | O | - | - | - | - | - | 3(0) | 3(0) |
| Koji Kondo | 0(0) | O | O | - | - | - | - | - | - | - | 2(0) | 2(0) |
| Toshihiro Yamaguchi | 0(0) | - | - | O | O | - | - | - | - | - | 2(0) | 2(0) |
| Yoshiaki Sato | 0(0) | O | - | - | - | - | - | - | - | - | 1(0) | 1(0) |
| Takahiro Yamada | 0(0) | - | - | - | - | O | - | - | - | - | 1(0) | 1(0) |
| Akira Narahashi | 0(0) | - | - | - | - | O | - | - | - | - | 1(0) | 1(0) |
| Naoto Otake | 0(0) | - | - | - | - | O | - | - | - | - | 1(0) | 1(0) |

== National team (Women) ==
=== Results ===
| 1994.08.20 | Japan | 2–0 | Slovakia | Slovakia |
| | Sawa (?); Otake (?) |

| 1994.08.21 | Japan | 1–0 | Austria | Slovakia |
| | Morimoto (?) |

| 1994.09.27 | Japan | 2–2 | Australia | Tokyo, Japan |
| | Noda (?); Takakura (?) | | ? (?) ? (?) | Stadium: National Stadium |

| 1994.10.04 | Japan | 5–0 | South Korea | Hiroshima, Japan |
| | Noda (?); Otake (?); Uchiyama (?); Nagamine (?) | | | Stadium: Fukuyama Takegahana Stadium |

| 1994.10.06 | Japan | 3–0 | Chinese Taipei | Hiroshima, Japan |
| | Noda (?); Takakura (?); Kioka (?) | | | Stadium: Fukuyama Takegahana Stadium |

| 1994.10.10 | Japan | 1–1 | China | Hiroshima, Japan |
| | Otake (?) | | ? (?) | Stadium: Fukuyama Takegahana Stadium |

| 1994.10.12 | Japan | 0–2 | China | Hiroshima, Japan |
| | | | ? (?) ? (?) | Stadium: Fukuyama Takegahana Stadium |

=== Players statistics ===
| Player | -1993 | 08.20 | 08.21 | 09.27 | 10.04 | 10.06 | 10.10 | 10.12 | 1994 | Total |
| Futaba Kioka | 56(28) | O | - | O | O | O(1) | - | O | 5(1) | 61(29) |
| Etsuko Handa | 56(19) | O | - | O | O | O | - | O | 5(0) | 61(19) |
| Kaori Nagamine | 53(44) | - | O | O | O(2) | - | O | O | 5(2) | 58(46) |
| Akemi Noda | 51(12) | O | - | O(1) | O(1) | O(1) | O | O | 6(3) | 57(15) |
| Asako Takakura | 47(22) | O | O | O(1) | O | O(1) | O | O | 7(2) | 54(24) |
| Yuriko Mizuma | 21(10) | - | O | - | - | - | - | - | 1(0) | 22(10) |
| Kyoko Kuroda | 17(7) | O | - | - | - | O | O | O | 4(0) | 21(7) |
| Megumi Sakata | 7(0) | - | O | - | - | - | - | - | 1(0) | 8(0) |
| Tamaki Uchiyama | 6(3) | - | O | O | O(1) | O | O | - | 5(1) | 11(4) |
| Maki Haneta | 5(1) | O | O | O | O | O | O | O | 7(0) | 12(1) |
| Homare Sawa | 4(4) | O(1) | - | O | O | O | O | O | 6(1) | 10(5) |
| Kaoru Kadohara | 4(1) | - | O | - | - | - | O | - | 2(0) | 6(1) |
| Junko Ozawa | 4(0) | O | - | O | O | O | O | O | 6(0) | 10(0) |
| Rie Yamaki | 4(0) | O | - | O | O | O | O | O | 6(0) | 10(0) |
| Yumi Tomei | 2(2) | O | - | O | O | O | O | O | 6(0) | 8(2) |
| Yuko Morimoto | 2(0) | - | O | - | - | - | - | - | 1(0) | 3(0) |
| Nami Otake | 0(0) | O(1) | - | O | O(1) | O | O(1) | O | 6(3) | 6(3) |
| Tsuru Morimoto | 0(0) | - | O(1) | O | O | - | O | - | 4(1) | 4(1) |
| Terumi Nagae | 0(0) | - | O | - | - | - | - | - | 1(0) | 1(0) |
| Yuki Fushimi | 0(0) | - | O | - | - | - | - | - | 1(0) | 1(0) |
| Inesu Emiko Takeoka | 0(0) | - | O | - | - | - | - | - | 1(0) | 1(0) |
| Minako Takashima | 0(0) | - | O | - | - | - | - | - | 1(0) | 1(0) |
| Etsuko Tahara | 0(0) | - | O | - | - | - | - | - | 1(0) | 1(0) |

== Births ==
- 10 November: Takuma Asano
