= 1996 in Japanese football =

1996 season

Japanese football in 1996

== J.League ==
| Pos | Team | Pld | W | PKL | L | GF | GA | GD | Pts | Qualification |
|---|---|---|---|---|---|---|---|---|---|---|
| 1 | Kashima Antlers | 30 | 21 | 3 | 6 | 61 | 34 | +27 | 66 | 1997–98 Asian Club Championship |
| 2 | Nagoya Grampus Eight | 30 | 21 | 0 | 9 | 63 | 39 | +24 | 63 | |
| 3 | Yokohama Flügels | 30 | 21 | 0 | 9 | 58 | 44 | +14 | 63 | |
| 4 | Júbilo Iwata | 30 | 20 | 2 | 8 | 53 | 38 | +15 | 62 | |
| 5 | Kashiwa Reysol | 30 | 20 | 0 | 10 | 67 | 52 | +15 | 60 | |
| 6 | Urawa Red Diamonds | 30 | 19 | 2 | 9 | 51 | 31 | +20 | 59 | |
| 7 | Verdy Kawasaki | 30 | 19 | 0 | 11 | 68 | 42 | +26 | 57 | 1997–98 Asian Cup Winners' Cup |
| 8 | Yokohama Marinos | 30 | 14 | 0 | 16 | 39 | 40 | −1 | 42 | |
| 9 | JEF United Ichihara | 30 | 13 | 1 | 16 | 45 | 47 | −2 | 40 | |
| 10 | Shimizu S-Pulse | 30 | 12 | 1 | 17 | 50 | 60 | −10 | 37 | |
| 11 | Bellmare Hiratsuka | 30 | 12 | 0 | 18 | 47 | 58 | −11 | 36 | |
| 12 | Gamba Osaka | 30 | 11 | 0 | 19 | 38 | 59 | −21 | 33 | |
| 13 | Cerezo Osaka | 30 | 10 | 0 | 20 | 38 | 56 | −18 | 30 | |
| 14 | Sanfrecce Hiroshima | 30 | 10 | 0 | 20 | 36 | 60 | −24 | 30 | |
| 15 | Avispa Fukuoka | 30 | 9 | 2 | 19 | 42 | 64 | −22 | 29 | |
| 16 | Kyoto Purple Sanga | 30 | 8 | 0 | 22 | 22 | 54 | −32 | 24 | |

Rules for classification: Win = 3 pts; P.K. loss = 1 pt; Regulation, E.T. loss = 0 pts

== Japan Football League ==
| Pos | Club | P | W | L | GF | GA | Pts | Notes |
| 1 | Honda | 30 | 25 | 5 | 83 | 35 | 75 | Champions (Refused promotion) |
| 2 | Vissel Kobe | 30 | 25 | 5 | 78 | 32 | 75 | Promoted to J.League |
| 3 | Tokyo Gas | 30 | 24 | 6 | 63 | 28 | 73 | |
| 4 | Tosu Futures | 30 | 20 | 10 | 68 | 43 | 62 | Folded |
| 5 | Consadole Sapporo | 30 | 20 | 10 | 60 | 43 | 62 | |
| 6 | Brummell Sendai | 30 | 18 | 12 | 67 | 52 | 56 | |
| 7 | Otsuka Pharmaceutical | 30 | 18 | 12 | 56 | 41 | 55 | |
| 8 | Montedio Yamagata | 30 | 16 | 14 | 45 | 49 | 49 | |
| 9 | Fujitsu Kawasaki | 30 | 15 | 15 | 48 | 45 | 45 | |
| 10 | Oita Trinity | 30 | 13 | 17 | 42 | 52 | 39 | |
| 11 | Ventforet Kofu | 30 | 11 | 19 | 50 | 56 | 33 | |
| 12 | Cosmo Oil Yokkaichi | 30 | 11 | 19 | 45 | 61 | 33 | Folded |
| 13 | NTT Kanto | 30 | 7 | 23 | 36 | 55 | 23 | |
| 14 | Fukushima | 30 | 7 | 23 | 30 | 63 | 22 | |
| 15 | Denso | 30 | 5 | 25 | 40 | 90 | 16 | |
| 16 | Seino Transportation | 30 | 5 | 25 | 28 | 82 | 15 | |

== National team (men) ==
=== Results ===
| 1996.02.10 | Japan | 4–1 | Australia | Wollongong, Australia |
| | Yamaguchi 34'; Takagi 61', 85'; Moriyasu 89' | JFA | ? (?) |

| 1996.02.14 | Japan | 0–3 | Australia | Melbourne, Australia |
| | | JFA | ? (?) ? (?) ? (?) |

| 1996.02.19 | Japan | 5–0 | Poland | Hong Kong |
| | Yamaguchi 29'; Takagi 31', 75'; Omura 40'; Miura 61' | JFA |

| 1996.02.22 | Japan | 1–1 (a.e.t.) (4–5 p) | Sweden | Hong Kong |
| | Omura 64' | JFA | ? (?) |

| 1996.05.26 | Japan | 1–0 | Yugoslavia | Tokyo, Japan |
| | Miura 62' | JFA | | Stadium: Tokyo National Stadium |

| 1996.05.29 | Japan | 3–2 | Mexico | Fukuoka, Japan |
| | Morishima 35'; Miura 46'; Soma 82' | JFA | ? (?) ? (?) | Stadium: Hakatanomori Football Stadium |

| 1996.08.25 | Japan | 5–3 | Uruguay | Osaka, Japan |
| | Maezono 15'; Miura 26', 68'; Takagi 42'; Okano 84' | JFA | ? (?) ? (?) ? (?) | Stadium: Osaka Nagai Stadium |

| 1996.09.11 | Japan | 1–0 | Uzbekistan | Tokyo, Japan |
| | Morishima 6' | JFA | | Stadium: Tokyo National Stadium |

| 1996.10.13 | Japan | 1–0 | Tunisia | Hyōgo, Japan |
| | Maezono 17' | JFA | | Stadium: Kobe Universiade Memorial Stadium |

| 1996.12.06 | Japan | 2–1 | Syria | Al Ain, United Arab Emirates |
| | 84' (o.g.); Takagi 87' | JFA | ? (?) |

| 1996.12.09 | Japan | 4–0 | Uzbekistan | Al Ain, United Arab Emirates |
| | Nanami 7'; Miura 37'; Maezono 86', 89' | JFA |

| 1996.12.12 | Japan | 1–0 | China PR | Al Ain, United Arab Emirates |
| | Soma 89' | JFA |

| 1996.12.15 | Japan | 0–2 | Kuwait | Al Ain, United Arab Emirates |
| | | JFA | ? (?) ? (?) |

=== Players statistics ===
| Player | -1995 | 02.10 | 02.14 | 02.19 | 02.22 | 05.26 | 05.29 | 08.25 | 09.11 | 10.13 | 12.06 | 12.09 | 12.12 | 12.15 | 1996 | Total |
| Masami Ihara | 75(4) | O | O | O | O | O | O | O | O | O | O | O | O | O | 13(0) | 88(4) |
| Kazuyoshi Miura | 52(29) | - | O | O(1) | O | O(1) | O(1) | O(2) | O | O | O | O(1) | O | O | 12(6) | 64(35) |
| Tsuyoshi Kitazawa | 38(3) | O | O | O | O | - | O | - | - | - | - | - | - | - | 5(0) | 43(3) |
| Hajime Moriyasu | 32(0) | O(1) | O | O | - | - | - | - | - | - | - | - | - | - | 3(1) | 35(1) |
| Takuya Takagi | 29(14) | O(2) | O | O(2) | O | - | - | O(1) | O | O | O(1) | O | - | O | 10(6) | 39(20) |
| Hisashi Kurosaki | 21(4) | - | - | - | - | - | O | O | - | - | - | - | - | - | 2(0) | 23(4) |
| Motohiro Yamaguchi | 14(1) | O(1) | O | O(1) | O | O | O | O | O | O | O | O | O | O | 13(2) | 27(3) |
| Hiroshige Yanagimoto | 12(0) | O | O | O | O | O | O | O | O | O | O | O | O | O | 13(0) | 25(0) |
| Kazuya Maekawa | 12(0) | O | O | - | O | - | - | O | - | O | - | - | - | - | 5(0) | 17(0) |
| Masakiyo Maezono | 10(0) | - | - | - | - | - | - | O(1) | O | O(1) | O | O(2) | O | O | 7(4) | 17(4) |
| Naoki Soma | 9(0) | O | O | O | O | O | O(1) | O | O | O | O | O | O(1) | O | 13(2) | 22(2) |
| Hiroaki Morishima | 9(0) | O | - | O | O | O | O(1) | O | O(1) | O | O | O | - | O | 11(2) | 20(2) |
| Norio Omura | 4(0) | O | O | O(1) | O(1) | O | O | O | O | - | O | O | O | O | 12(2) | 16(2) |
| Yoshiyuki Hasegawa | 4(0) | - | - | - | - | O | O | - | - | - | - | - | - | - | 2(0) | 6(0) |
| Masayuki Okano | 3(0) | O | O | - | O | O | - | O(1) | O | O | O | O | O | O | 11(1) | 14(1) |
| Tadashi Nakamura | 3(0) | O | - | - | - | O | O | - | O | - | - | - | - | - | 4(0) | 7(0) |
| Nobuyuki Kojima | 3(0) | - | - | O | - | - | - | - | - | - | - | - | - | - | 1(0) | 4(0) |
| Hiroshi Nanami | 2(2) | O | O | O | O | O | O | O | O | O | O | O(1) | O | O | 13(1) | 15(3) |
| Yutaka Akita | 2(1) | - | - | O | - | - | - | - | - | - | - | - | O | - | 2(0) | 4(1) |
| Yasuto Honda | 2(0) | O | O | O | O | O | O | O | O | O | O | O | O | O | 13(0) | 15(0) |
| Kentaro Sawada | 2(0) | O | O | - | - | - | - | - | - | - | - | - | - | - | 2(0) | 4(0) |
| Kenichi Shimokawa | 1(0) | - | - | - | - | O | O | - | O | - | O | O | O | O | 7(0) | 8(0) |
| Shoji Jo | 1(0) | - | - | - | - | - | - | - | - | O | - | - | O | O | 3(0) | 4(0) |
| Masaharu Suzuki | 1(0) | - | O | - | - | - | - | - | - | - | - | - | - | - | 1(0) | 2(0) |
| Toshihide Saito | 0(0) | - | - | - | - | - | - | O | - | O | - | - | - | - | 2(0) | 2(0) |
| Masaki Tsuchihashi | 0(0) | - | - | - | - | O | - | - | - | - | - | - | - | - | 1(0) | 1(0) |
| Toshihiro Hattori | 0(0) | - | - | - | - | - | - | - | O | - | - | - | - | - | 1(0) | 1(0) |
| Naoki Sakai | 0(0) | - | - | - | - | - | - | - | - | O | - | - | - | - | 1(0) | 1(0) |
| Ryuji Michiki | 0(0) | - | - | - | - | - | - | - | - | O | - | - | - | - | 1(0) | 1(0) |

== National team (women) ==
=== Results ===
| 1996.05.11 | Japan | 0–3 | China | United States |
| | | | ? (?) ? (?) ? (?) |

| 1996.05.16 | Japan | 0–4 | United States | United States |
| | | | ? (?) ? (?) ? (?) ? (?) |

| 1996.05.18 | Japan | 0–0 (4–3 p) | Canada | United States |

| 1996.05.26 | Japan | 1–1 | Denmark | Tokyo, Japan |
| | Obe (?) | | ? (?) | Stadium: National Stadium |

| 1996.05.29 | Japan | 3–4 | Denmark | Fukuoka, Japan |
| | Uchiyama (?) | | ? (?) ? (?) ? (?) ? (?) | Stadium: Hakatanomori Football Stadium |

| 1996.07.10 | Japan | 2–2 | Australia | United States |
| | Sawa (?) | | ? (?) ? (?) |

| 1996.07.15 | Japan | 1–3 | Sweden | United States |
| | Sawa (?) | | ? (?) ? (?) ? (?) |

| 1996.07.21 | Japan | 2–3 | Germany | United States |
| | Kioka (?); Noda (?) | | ? (?) ? (?) ? (?) |

| 1996.07.23 | Japan | 0–2 | Brazil | United States |
| | | | ? (?) ? (?) |

| 1996.07.25 | Japan | 0–4 | Norway | United States |
| | | | ? (?) ? (?) ? (?) ? (?) |

=== Players statistics ===
| Player | -1995 | 05.11 | 05.16 | 05.18 | 05.26 | 05.29 | 07.10 | 07.15 | 07.21 | 07.23 | 07.25 | 1996 | Total |
| Futaba Kioka | 70(29) | - | - | - | - | - | O | O | O(1) | O | O | 5(1) | 75(30) |
| Etsuko Handa | 68(19) | O | - | O | O | O | O | O | O | - | - | 7(0) | 75(19) |
| Akemi Noda | 66(23) | O | O | O | O | O | O | O | O(1) | O | O | 10(1) | 76(24) |
| Kaori Nagamine | 63(48) | - | - | O | - | - | - | - | - | - | - | 1(0) | 64(48) |
| Asako Takakura | 63(24) | O | O | O | O | O | O | O | O | O | O | 10(0) | 73(24) |
| Tamaki Uchiyama | 20(13) | O | O | - | O | O(3) | O | - | O | O | O | 8(3) | 28(16) |
| Maki Haneta | 20(1) | O | O | O | O | O | - | O | O | O | O | 9(0) | 29(1) |
| Rie Yamaki | 20(0) | O | O | O | O | O | O | O | O | O | O | 10(0) | 30(0) |
| Homare Sawa | 18(5) | O | O | O | O | O | O(2) | O(1) | O | O | O | 10(3) | 28(8) |
| Yumi Tomei | 16(5) | O | O | - | O | O | O | O | O | O | O | 9(0) | 25(5) |
| Junko Ozawa | 15(0) | O | - | - | O | O | - | - | O | O | - | 5(0) | 20(0) |
| Nami Otake | 14(7) | O | O | - | O | O | O | O | - | O | - | 7(0) | 21(7) |
| Yumi Obe | 13(1) | O | O | O | O(1) | O | O | O | O | O | O | 10(1) | 23(2) |
| Kae Nishina | 9(0) | O | O | O | O | O | O | O | O | O | O | 10(0) | 19(0) |
| Megumi Sakata | 9(0) | - | O | - | - | - | - | - | - | - | - | 1(0) | 10(0) |
| Kaoru Kadohara | 8(1) | - | - | O | - | O | O | - | - | - | O | 4(0) | 12(1) |
| Ryoko Uno | 5(0) | - | - | O | - | - | - | - | - | - | - | 1(0) | 6(0) |
| Shiho Onodera | 4(0) | - | - | O | - | - | O | O | - | - | O | 4(0) | 8(0) |
| Miyuki Izumi | 0(0) | - | O | O | O | - | O | - | - | - | O | 5(0) | 5(0) |
| Rie Kimura | 0(0) | - | O | O | - | - | - | - | - | - | - | 2(0) | 2(0) |

== Births ==
- 23 August: Yosuke Ideguchi
