= 1993 in Japanese football =

1993 season

Japanese football in 1993

== J.League ==
Pos	Team	Pld	W	L	GF	GA	GD	Qualification
1	Verdy Kawasaki	36	28	8	69	28	+41	1994–95 Asian Club Championship
2	Kashima Antlers	36	23	13	72	43	+29	
3	Shimizu S-Pulse	36	24	12	54	34	+20	
4	Yokohama Marinos	36	21	15	60	48	+12	
5	Sanfrecce Hiroshima	36	18	18	54	49	+5	
6	Yokohama Flügels	36	16	20	44	51	−7	1994–95 Asian Cup Winners' Cup
7	Gamba Osaka	36	16	20	51	65	−14	
8	JEF United Ichihara	36	14	22	51	67	−16	
9	Nagoya Grampus Eight	36	12	24	48	66	−18	
10	Urawa Red Diamonds	36	8	28	26	78	−52	

== Japan Football League ==
=== Division 1 ===
Pos	Team	P	W	L	GF	GA	Qualification or relegation
1	Fujita	18	16	2	49	12	Promoted to J.League
2	Yamaha Motors	18	14	4	31	15	Promoted to J.League
3	Toshiba	18	11	7	42	30	
4	Otsuka Pharmaceutical	18	10	8	33	39	
5	Kashiwa Reysol	18	9	9	41	24	
6	Fujitsu	18	8	10	27	37	
7	Yanmar Diesel	18	7	11	34	43	
8	Tokyo Gas	18	7	11	20	31	
9	Chuo Bohan	18	6	12	25	39	
10	Kyoto Shiko	18	2	16	20	52	

=== Division 2 ===
Pos	Team	P	W	L	GF	GA	Qualification or relegation
1	Honda	18	15	3	62	21	
2	PJM Futures	18	15	3	46	9	
3	NKK	18	14	4	37	7	Folded
4	Cosmo Oil	18	11	7	30	26	
5	Kawasaki Steel	18	10	8	30	23	
6	Toyota Motors Higashi-Fuji	18	6	12	25	33	Folded
7	NTT Kanto	18	6	12	20	30	
8	Seino Transportation	18	6	12	20	42	
9	Kofu	18	6	12	15	37	
10	Toho Titanium	18	1	17	10	57	Relegated to Regional Leagues

== National team (Men) ==
=== Results ===
1993.03.07	Japan	0–1	Hungary	Fukuoka, Japan
		JFA	? (?)	Stadium: Hakatanomori Athletic Stadium

1993.03.14	Japan	3–1	United States	Tokyo, Japan
	K. Miura 36', 80'; 68' (o.g.)	JFA	? (?)	Stadium: Tokyo National Stadium

1993.04.08	Japan	1–0	Thailand	Hyōgo, Japan
	K. Miura 29'	JFA		Stadium: Kobe Universiade Memorial Stadium

1993.04.11	Japan	8–0	Bangladesh	Tokyo, Japan
	K. Miura 18', 44', 52', 53'; Takagi 25', 57'; Fukuda 58', 88'	JFA		Stadium: Tokyo National Stadium

1993.04.15	Japan	5–0	Sri Lanka	Tokyo, Japan
	Takagi 10', 49'; Hashiratani 18'; K. Miura 34', 51'	JFA		Stadium: Tokyo National Stadium

1993.04.18	Japan	2–0	United Arab Emirates	Tokyo, Japan
	Hashiratani 20'; Takagi 76'	JFA		Stadium: Tokyo National Stadium

1993.04.28	Japan	1–0	Thailand	Dubai, United Arab Emirates
	Horiike 49'	JFA

1993.04.30	Japan	4–1	Bangladesh	Dubai, United Arab Emirates
	Fukuda 2'; K. Miura 30'; Yoshida 36'; Takagi 61'	JFA	Rumi 11'

1993.05.05	Japan	6–0	Sri Lanka	Dubai, United Arab Emirates
	Ramos 31'; Ihara 42', 56'; Takagi 61'; K. Miura 80'; Nakayama 82'	JFA

1993.05.07	Japan	1–1	United Arab Emirates	Al Ain, United Arab Emirates
	Sawanobori 83'	JFA	? (?)

1993.10.04	Japan	1–0 (a.e.t.)	Ivory Coast	Tokyo, Japan
	K. Miura 116'	JFA		Stadium: Tokyo National Stadium

1993.10.15	Japan	0–0	Saudi Arabia	Doha, Qatar
		JFA

1993.10.18	Japan	1–2	Iran	Doha, Qatar
	Nakayama 88'	JFA	? (?) ? (?)

1993.10.21	Japan	3–0	North Korea	Doha, Qatar
	K. Miura 28', 69'; Nakayama 51'	JFA

1993.10.25	Japan	1–0	South Korea	Doha, Qatar
	K. Miura 59'	JFA

1993.10.28	Japan	2–2	Iraq	Doha, Qatar
	K. Miura 5'; Nakayama 69'	JFA	? (?) ? (?)

=== Players statistics ===
Player	-1992	03.07	03.14	04.08	04.11	04.15	04.18	04.28	04.30	05.05	05.07	10.04	10.15	10.18	10.21	10.25	10.28	1993	Total
Satoshi Tsunami	65(2)	O	O	O	O	O	O	O	O	O	O	-	-	-	-	-	-	10(0)	75(2)
Takumi Horiike	40(1)	O	O	O	O	O	O	O(1)	O	O	O	O	O	O	O	O	O	16(1)	56(2)
Masami Ihara	35(0)	O	O	O	O	O	O	O	-	O(2)	O	O	O	O	O	O	O	15(2)	50(2)
Tetsuji Hashiratani	34(3)	-	-	O	O	O(1)	O(1)	O	O	O	O	O	O	O	O	O	O	14(2)	48(5)
Toshinobu Katsuya	21(0)	O	O	-	-	-	-	-	O	-	-	-	-	-	O	O	O	6(0)	27(0)
Shigetatsu Matsunaga	20(0)	-	-	O	O	O	O	O	O	O	O	O	O	O	O	O	O	14(0)	34(0)
Mitsunori Yoshida	19(1)	O	O	O	O	O	O	O	O(1)	O	O	O	O	O	O	O	O	16(1)	35(2)
Kenta Hasegawa	17(3)	-	-	-	-	-	-	-	-	-	-	O	-	O	O	O	O	5(0)	22(3)
Kazuyoshi Miura	16(2)	O	O(2)	O(1)	O(4)	O(2)	O	O	O(1)	O(1)	O	O(1)	O	O	O(2)	O(1)	O(1)	16(16)	32(18)
Masahiro Fukuda	15(3)	O	O	O	O(2)	O	O	O	O(1)	O	O	O	O	O	-	O	O	15(3)	30(6)
Ruy Ramos	15(0)	-	-	O	O	O	O	O	O	O(1)	O	O	O	O	O	O	O	14(1)	29(1)
Tsuyoshi Kitazawa	13(1)	O	O	-	-	-	-	-	-	-	-	-	-	-	O	O	-	4(0)	17(1)
Nobuhiro Takeda	12(1)	-	-	-	O	-	-	-	O	-	-	-	-	-	-	O	O	4(0)	16(1)
Takuya Takagi	11(5)	O	O	O	O(2)	O(2)	O(1)	O	O(1)	O(1)	O	O	O	O	-	-	-	13(7)	24(12)
Hisashi Kurosaki	9(1)	O	-	-	-	-	-	-	-	-	-	-	-	-	-	-	-	1(0)	10(1)
Masashi Nakayama	7(3)	O	O	-	-	O	-	-	-	O(1)	-	-	-	O(1)	O(1)	O	O(1)	8(4)	15(7)
Hajime Moriyasu	7(0)	O	O	O	O	O	O	O	O	O	O	O	O	O	O	-	O	15(0)	22(0)
Kazuya Maekawa	3(0)	O	O	-	-	-	-	-	-	-	-	-	-	-	-	-	-	2(0)	5(0)
Masaaki Sawanobori	0(0)	-	-	O	O	O	-	-	-	O	O(1)	-	-	-	-	-	-	5(1)	5(1)
Yasutoshi Miura	0(0)	-	-	-	-	-	-	-	-	-	-	O	O	O	-	-	-	3(0)	3(0)

== National team (Women) ==
=== Results ===
1993.12.04	Japan	6–1	Chinese Taipei	Malaysia
	Haneta (?); Takakura (?); Handa (?); Nagamine (?); Mizuma (?)		? (?)

1993.12.06	Japan	15–0	Philippines	Malaysia
	Kioka (?); Takakura (?); Sawa (?); Nagamine (?); Mizuma (?); Handa (?)

1993.12.08	Japan	4–0	Hong Kong	Malaysia
	Tomei (?); Takakura (?); Kadohara (?)

1993.12.10	Japan	1–3	China	Malaysia
	Takakura (?)		? (?) ? (?) ? (?)

1993.12.12	Japan	3–0	Chinese Taipei	Malaysia
	Kioka (?); Handa (?); Mizuma (?)

=== Players statistics ===
Player	-1992	12.04	12.06	12.08	12.10	12.12	1993	Total
Futaba Kioka	51(26)	O	O(1)	O	O	O(1)	5(2)	56(28)
Etsuko Handa	51(16)	O(1)	O(1)	O	O	O(1)	5(3)	56(19)
Kaori Nagamine	49(39)	O(1)	O(4)	-	O	O	4(5)	53(44)
Akemi Noda	47(12)	O	-	O	O	O	4(0)	51(12)
Asako Takakura	42(16)	O(2)	O(2)	O(1)	O(1)	O	5(6)	47(22)
Sayuri Yamaguchi	28(1)	-	O	-	-	-	1(0)	29(1)
Yuriko Mizuma	16(5)	O(1)	O(3)	O	O	O(1)	5(5)	21(10)
Megumi Sakata	6(0)	-	-	O	-	-	1(0)	7(0)
Ryoko Uno	1(0)	O	-	O	O	O	4(0)	5(0)
Yumi Obe	1(0)	-	O	O	-	-	2(0)	3(0)
Maki Haneta	0(0)	O(1)	O	O	O	O	5(1)	5(1)
Homare Sawa	0(0)	-	O(4)	O	O	O	4(4)	4(4)
Kaoru Kadohara	0(0)	O	-	O(1)	O	O	4(1)	4(1)
Junko Ozawa	0(0)	O	O	-	O	O	4(0)	4(0)
Rie Yamaki	0(0)	O	O	-	O	O	4(0)	4(0)
Yumi Tomei	0(0)	-	O	O(2)	-	-	2(2)	2(2)
Yuko Morimoto	0(0)	-	O	O	-	-	2(0)	2(0)

== Births ==
- 20 April: Ryosuke Yamanaka
