= 1996 L.League Cup final =

Yomiuri-Seiyu Beleza	Prima Ham FC Kunoichi
0	0
- Date: July 7, 1996
- Venue: Nihondaira Sports Stadium, Shizuoka

1996 L.League Cup final was the 1st final of the L.League Cup competition. The final was played at Nihondaira Sports Stadium in Shizuoka on July 7, 1996. Yomiuri-Seiyu Beleza won the championship.

== Overview ==
Yomiuri-Seiyu Beleza won their 1st title, by defeating Prima Ham FC Kunoichi on a penalty shoot-out.

== Match details ==
July 7, 1996

Yomiuri-Seiyu Beleza	0-0 (pen 4-3)	Prima Ham FC Kunoichi

Nihondaira Sports Stadium

== See also ==
- 1996 L.League Cup
