= Naoko Nishigai =

Japanese footballer

Naoko Nishigai 西貝 尚子
Personal information
- Full name: Naoko Nishigai
- Date of birth: January 22, 1969 (age 57)
- Place of birth: Japan
- Position: Goalkeeper

Senior career*
| Years | Team | Apps | (Gls) |
| ????–1998 | Nikko Securities Dream Ladies | | |
| 1999 | OKI FC Winds | | |

International career
| 1999 | Japan | 2 | (0) |
- * Club domestic league appearances and goals

Naoko Nishigai (西貝 尚子, Nishigai Naoko; born January 22, 1969) is a former Japanese football player. She played for Japan national team.

== Club career ==
Nishigai was born on January 22, 1969. She played for Nikko Securities Dream Ladies and OKI FC Winds. She was selected Best Eleven in 1998 season.

== National team career ==
On May 2, 1999, when Nishigai was 30 years old, she debuted for Japan national team against United States. She was a member of Japan for 1999 World Cup. She played 2 games for Japan in 1999.

== National team statistics ==
Japan national team
| Year | Apps | Goals |
|---|---|---|
| 1999 | 2 | 0 |
| Total | 2 | 0 |
