= Yuriko Mizuma =

Japanese footballer

Yuriko Mizuma 水間 百合子
Personal information
- Full name: Yuriko Mizuma
- Date of birth: July 22, 1970 (age 56)
- Place of birth: Yamagata, Japan
- Height: 1.63 m (5 ft 4 in)
- Position: Forward

Senior career*
Years	Team	Apps	(Gls)
????–1992	Urawa Motobuto Ladies FC		
1993–1995	Takarazuka Bunnys	44	(12)
Total		44	(12)

International career
1990–1994	Japan	22	(10)
Medal record
Representing Japan
AFC Women's Asian Cup
Silver medal – second place	1991 Japan
Bronze medal – third place	1993 Malaysia
Asian Games
Silver medal – second place	1990 Beijing	Team
- * Club domestic league appearances and goals

Yuriko Mizuma (水間 百合子, Mizuma Yuriko; born July 22, 1970) is a former Japanese football player. She played for the Japan national team.

== Club career ==
Mizuma was born in Yamagata Prefecture on July 22, 1970. She played for Urawa Motobuto Ladies FC until 1992. In 1993, she moved to Asahi Kokusai Bunnys (later Takarazuka Bunnys). In 1995, she retired due to injury.

== National team career ==
On September 9, 1990, when Mizuma was 20 years old, she debuted and scored a goal for the Japan national team against South Korea. She was a member of Japan's squad for 1991 World Cup. She also played at 1990 Asian Games, 1991 and 1993 AFC Championship. She played 22 games and scored 10 goals for Japan until 1994.

== National team statistics ==
Japan national team
Year	Apps	Goals
1990	5	3
1991	11	2
1992	0	0
1993	5	5
1994	1	0
Total	22	10
