= Urawa Motobuto Ladies FC =

Urawa Motobuto Ladies FC 浦和本太レディースFC
- Full name: Urawa Motobuto Ladies FC
- Nickname: Urawa Motobuto Ladies FC
- Founded: 1980

Urawa Motobuto Ladies FC (浦和本太レディースFC) was a women's football team which played in Division 1 of Japan's Nadeshiko League. It was formed in 1980 as Motobuto Ladies and founded the league back in 1994. The club was disbanded in 2008.

== Results ==
| Season | Domestic League | | | | National Cup | League Cup | League Note |
| Season | League | Level | Place | Tms. | National Cup | League Cup | League Note |
|---|---|---|---|---|---|---|---|
| 1989 | - | - | - | - | 1st Stage | - | |
| 1990 | - | - | - | - | DNQ | - | |
| 1991 | - | - | - | - | DNQ | - | |
| 1992 | JLSL Challenge | 2 | 2nd | 4 | DNQ | - | |
| 1993 | JLSL Challenge | 2 | 1st | 4 | 2nd Stage | - | Promoted for Div.1 |
| 1994 | L | 1 | 10th | 10 | 2nd Stage | - | 1st Stage : 10th / 2nd Stage : 10th / Relegated to Div.2 |
| 1995 | JLSL Challenge | 2 | 2nd | 3 | DNQ | - | Relegated to Regional League |
| 1996 | Kanto | 2 | 1st | 8 | 2nd Stage | - | |
| 1997 | Kanto | 2 | 2nd | 8 | DNQ | - | |
| 1998 | Kanto | 2 | 2nd | 8 | DNQ | - | |
| 1999 | Kanto | 2 | 2nd | 8 | DNQ | - | |
| 2000 | Kanto | 2 | 1st | 8 | DNQ | - | |
| 2001 | Kanto | 2 | | 8 | DNQ | - | |
| 2002 | Kanto | 2 | 1st | 8 | DNQ | - | |
| 2003 | Kanto | 2 | 2nd | 8 | DNQ | - | |
| 2004 | Kanto | 3 | 2nd | 8 | DNQ | - | |
| 2005 | Kanto | 3 | | 8 | 1st Stage | - | |
| 2006 | Kanto | 3 | 4th | 8 | DNQ | - | |
| 2007 | Kanto | 3 | 8th | 8 | DNQ | - | |

== Transition of team name ==
- Urawa Motobuto Ladies FC : 1980–1993
- Urawa Ladies FC : 1994–1997
- Urawa Motobuto Ladies FC : 1998–2008
