= Tsuru Morimoto =

Japanese footballer

Tsuru Morimoto 森本 鶴
Personal information
- Full name: Tsuru Morimoto
- Date of birth: 9 November 1970 (age 56)
- Place of birth: Japan
- Position: Forward

Senior career*
Years	Team	Apps	(Gls)
- Nissan FC
- Nikko Securities Dream Ladies
- Lazio

International career
1994–1995	Japan	5	(1)
Medal record
Representing Japan
AFC Women's Asian Cup
Silver medal – second place	1995 Malaysia
Asian Games
Silver medal – second place	1994 Hiroshima	Team
- * Club domestic league appearances and goals

Tsuru Morimoto (森本 鶴, Morimoto Tsuru; born 9 November 1970) is a former Japanese football player. She played for Japan national team. Her father Mamoru Morimoto is former middle distance runner.

== Club career ==
Morimoto was born on 9 November 1970. She played for Nissan FC. However, the club was disbanded in 1993. After she left the club, she played for Nikko Securities Dream Ladies and the Ladies side of Italian Serie A club Lazio.

== National team career ==
On 21 August 1994, Morimoto debuted and scored a goal for Japan national team against Austria. She was a member of Japan for 1995 World Cup. She also played at 1994 Asian Games and 1995 AFC Championship. She played 5 games and scored 1 goal for Japan until 1995.

== National team statistics ==
Japan national team
Year	Apps	Goals
1994	4	1
1995	1	0
Total	5	1

== See also ==
- 1995 FIFA Women's World Cup
