= Kazumi Kishi =

Japanese footballer

Kazumi Kishi 岸 一美
Personal information
- Full name: Kazumi Kishi
- Date of birth: November 25, 1975 (age 50)
- Place of birth: Japan
- Height: 1.65 m (5 ft 5 in)
- Position: Forward

Senior career*
Years	Team	Apps	(Gls)
- Urawa Reinas FC

International career
1998–2001	Japan	9	(2)
Medal record
Representing Japan
Asian Games
Bronze medal – third place	1998 Bangkok	Team
- * Club domestic league appearances and goals

Kazumi Kishi (岸 一美, Kishi Kazumi; born November 25, 1975) is a former Japanese football player. She played for Japan national team.

== Club career ==
Kishi was born on November 25, 1975. She played for Urawa Reinas FC.

== National team career ==
On May 21, 1998, Kishi debuted for Japan national team against United States. She played at 1998 Asian Games. She played 9 games and scored 2 goals for Japan until 2001.

== National team statistics ==
Japan national team
Year	Apps	Goals
1998	5	2
1999	1	0
2000	0	0
2001	3	0
Total	9	2
