= Inesu Emiko Takeoka =

Japanese footballer

Inesu Emiko Takeoka 武岡 イネス 恵美子
Personal information
- Full name: Inesu Emiko Takeoka
- Date of birth: 1 May 1971 (age 55)
- Place of birth: Japan
- Position: Forward

Senior career*
Years	Team	Apps	(Gls)
????–1998	Nikko Securities Dream Ladies		

International career
1994–1995	Japan	3	(3)
Medal record
Representing Japan
AFC Women's Asian Cup
Silver medal – second place	1995 Malaysia
- * Club domestic league appearances and goals

Inesu Emiko Takeoka (武岡 イネス 恵美子, Takeoka Inesu Emiko; born 1 May 1971) is a former Japanese football player. She played for Japan national team.

== Club career ==
Takeoka was born on 1 May 1971. She played for Nikko Securities Dream Ladies. The club won L.League championship for 3 years in a row (1996-1998). However, the club was disbanded in 1998 due to financial strain and she retired.

== National team career ==
On 21 August 1994, Takeoka debuted for Japan national team against Austria. She was a member of Japan for 1995 World Cup. She also played at 1995 AFC Championship. She played 3 games and scored 3 goals for Japan until 1995.

== National team statistics ==
Japan national team
Year	Apps	Goals
1994	1	0
1995	2	3
Total	3	3
