= Miki Sugawara =

Japanese footballer

Miki Sugawara 菅原 美希
Personal information
- Full name: Miki Sugawara
- Place of birth: Japan
- Position: Midfielder

Senior career*
Years	Team	Apps	(Gls)
- Iga FC Kunoichi

International career
1998	Japan	7	(2)
Medal record
Representing Japan
Asian Games
Bronze medal – third place	1998 Bangkok	Team
- * Club domestic league appearances and goals

Miki Sugawara (菅原 美希, Sugawara Miki) is a former Japanese football player. She played for Japan national team.

== Club career ==
Sugawara played for Iga FC Kunoichi.

== National team career ==
On May 17, 1998, Sugawara debuted for Japan national team against United States. She played at 1998 Asian Games. She played 7 games and scored 2 goals for Japan in 1998.

== National team statistics ==
Japan national team
Year	Apps	Goals
1998	7	2
Total	7	2
