= 1996 L.League Cup =

1986 women's football cup in Japan

Statistics of L. League Cup in the 1996 season.

== Overview ==
Yomiuri-Seiyu Beleza won the championship.

== Results ==
=== Preliminary round ===
==== East ====
Pos	Team	Pld	W	D	L	GF	GA	GD	Pts
1	Yomiuri-Seiyu Beleza	4	2	2	0	8	2	+6	8
2	Suzuyo Shimizu FC Lovely Ladies	4	2	2	0	9	5	+4	8
3	Nikko Securities Dream Ladies	4	2	1	1	7	3	+4	7
4	Fujita SC Mercury	4	1	1	2	7	7	0	4
5	OKI FC Winds	4	0	0	4	1	15	−14	0

==== West ====
Pos	Team	Pld	W	D	L	GF	GA	GD	Pts
1	Prima Ham FC Kunoichi	4	3	1	0	10	1	+9	10
2	Matsushita Electric Panasonic Bambina	4	2	1	1	4	4	0	7
3	Tasaki Perule FC	4	2	0	2	4	2	+2	6
4	Takarazuka Bunnys	4	1	1	2	5	9	−4	4
5	Shiroki FC Serena	4	0	1	3	2	9	−7	1

=== Final round ===
==== Semifinals ====
- Yomiuri-Seiyu Beleza 2-1 Matsushita Electric Panasonic Bambina
- Suzuyo Shimizu FC Lovely Ladies 0-2 Prima Ham FC Kunoichi

==== Third place match ====
- Konomiya Speranza Osaka-Takatsuki|Matsushita Electric Panasonic Bambina 1-2 Suzuyo Shimizu FC Lovely Ladies

==== Final ====
- Yomiuri-Seiyu Beleza 0-0 (pen 4-3) Prima Ham FC Kunoichi
