= Kaoru Nagadome =

Japanese footballer

Kaoru Nagadome 永留 かおる
Personal information
- Full name: Kaoru Nagadome
- Date of birth: May 7, 1973 (age 53)
- Place of birth: Japan
- Position: Defender

Senior career*
Years	Team	Apps	(Gls)
- Prima Ham FC Kunoichi

International career
1997–1999	Japan	4	(0)
- * Club domestic league appearances and goals

Kaoru Nagadome (永留 かおる, Nagadome Kaoru; born May 7, 1973) is a former Japanese football player. She played for Japan national team.

== Club career ==
Nagadome was born on May 7, 1973. She played for Prima Ham FC Kunoichi. She was selected Best Eleven in 1995 season.

== National team career ==
On June 15, 1997, Nagadome debuted for Japan national team against China. She was a member of Japan for 1999 World Cup. She played 4 games for Japan until 1999.

== National team statistics ==
Japan national team
Year	Apps	Goals
1997	1	0
1998	0	0
1999	3	0
Total	4	0
