= Mayumi Omatsu =

Japanese footballer

Mayumi Omatsu 大松 真由美
Personal information
- Full name: Mayumi Omatsu
- Date of birth: July 12, 1970 (age 56)
- Place of birth: Japan
- Position: Forward

Senior career*
Years	Team	Apps	(Gls)
????–1998	Nikko Securities Dream Ladies		
1999	OKI FC Winds		

International career
1997–1999	Japan	12	(1)
Medal record
Representing Japan
AFC Women's Asian Cup
Bronze medal – third place	1997 China
- * Club domestic league appearances and goals

Mayumi Omatsu (大松 真由美, Ōmatsu Mayumi; born July 12, 1970) is a former Japanese football player. She played for Japan national team.

== Club career ==
Omatsu was born on July 12, 1970. She played for Nikko Securities Dream Ladies. The club won L.League championship and she was selected Best Eleven for 3 years in a row (1996-1998). However, the club was disbanded in 1998 due to financial strain. She moved to OKI FC Winds in 1999. However the club was disbanded end of season.

== National team career ==
On June 8, 1997, Omatsu debuted for Japan national team against China. She played at 1997 AFC Championship. She was also a member of Japan for 1999 World Cup. She played 12 games and scored 1 goal for Japan until 1999.

== National team statistics ==
Japan national team
Year	Apps	Goals
1997	6	1
1998	5	0
1999	1	0
Total	12	1
