= Shiho Onodera =

Japanese footballer

Shiho Onodera 小野寺 志保
Personal information
- Full name: Shiho Onodera
- Date of birth: 18 November 1973 (age 52)
- Place of birth: Yamato, Kanagawa, Japan
- Height: 1.63 m (5 ft 4 in)
- Position: Goalkeeper

Senior career*
Years	Team	Apps	(Gls)
1989–2008	Nippon TV Beleza	275	(0)
2014–2016	Yamato Sylphid		
Total		275	(0)

International career
1995–2004	Japan	23	(0)
Medal record
Nippon TV Beleza
Winner	Nadeshiko League	1990
Winner	Nadeshiko League	1991
Winner	Nadeshiko League	1992
Winner	Nadeshiko League	1993
Winner	Nadeshiko League	2000
Winner	Nadeshiko League	2001
Winner	Nadeshiko League	2002
Winner	Nadeshiko League	2005
Winner	Nadeshiko League	2006
Winner	Nadeshiko League	2007
Winner	Nadeshiko League	2008
Runner-up	Nadeshiko League	1989
Runner-up	Nadeshiko League	1994
Runner-up	Nadeshiko League	1997
Runner-up	Nadeshiko League	1998
Runner-up	Nadeshiko League	1999
Runner-up	Nadeshiko League	2003
Runner-up	Nadeshiko League	2004
Winner	Nadeshiko League Cup	1996
Winner	Nadeshiko League Cup	1999
Winner	Nadeshiko League Cup	2007
Runner-up	Nadeshiko League Cup	1997
Winner	Empress's Cup	1993
Winner	Empress's Cup	1997
Winner	Empress's Cup	2000
Winner	Empress's Cup	2004
Winner	Empress's Cup	2005
Winner	Empress's Cup	2007
Winner	Empress's Cup	2008
Runner-up	Empress's Cup	1986
Runner-up	Empress's Cup	1991
Runner-up	Empress's Cup	1992
Runner-up	Empress's Cup	1996
Runner-up	Empress's Cup	2002
Runner-up	Empress's Cup	2003
Representing Japan
AFC Women's Asian Cup
Silver medal – second place	1995 Malaysia
Silver medal – second place	2001 Chinese Taipei
Asian Games
Silver medal – second place	1994 Hiroshima	Team
Bronze medal – third place	1998 Bangkok	Team
- * Club domestic league appearances and goals

Shiho Onodera (小野寺 志保, Onodera Shiho; born 18 November 1973) is a former Japanese football player. She played for Japan national team.

== Club career ==
Onodera was born in Yamato on 18 November 1973. In 1989, she joined Yomiuri Beleza (later Nippon TV Beleza). In 1990 season, she debuted in L.League and she was selected Young Player Awards. She played 275 matches for 20 years at the club until end of 2008 season. She was selected Best Eleven 7 times (1991, 1992, 1994, 1995, 1997, 2000 and 2005). The club won L.League championship 11 times. In 2014, she came back at her local club Yamato Sylphid. At the end of 2016 season, she retired.

== National team career ==
In September 1995, Onodera was selected Japan national team for 1995 AFC Championship. At this competition, on 22 September, she debuted against South Korea. She was a member of Japan for 1995, 1999, 2003 World Cup, 1996 and 2004 Summer Olympics. She also played at 1998 and 2001 AFC Championship. She played 23 games for Japan until 2004.

== National team statistics ==
Japan national team
Year	Apps	Goals
1995	4	0
1996	4	0
1997	0	0
1998	2	0
1999	1	0
2000	2	0
2001	3	0
2002	2	0
2003	2	0
2004	3	0
Total	23	0
