= Yumi Umeoka =

Japanese footballer

Yumi Umeoka 梅岡 由美
Personal information
- Full name: Yumi Umeoka
- Place of birth: Japan
- Position: Defender

Senior career*
| Years | Team | Apps | (Gls) |
- Prima Ham FC Kunoichi

International career
| 1997–1998 | Japan | 4 | (0) |
Medal record
Representing Japan
AFC Women's Asian Cup
| Bronze medal – third place | 1997 China |
- * Club domestic league appearances and goals

Yumi Umeoka (梅岡 由美, Umeoka Yumi) is a former Japanese football player. She played for Japan national team.

== Club career ==
Umeoka played for Prima Ham FC Kunoichi.

== National team career ==
On June 15, 1997, Umeoka debuted for the Japan national team against China. She played at 1997 AFC Championship. She played 4 games for Japan until 1998.

== National team statistics ==
Japan national team
| Year | Apps | Goals |
|---|---|---|
| 1997 | 3 | 0 |
| 1998 | 1 | 0 |
| Total | 4 | 0 |
