= Football at the 1998 Asian Games – Women's tournament =

Women at the 1998 Asian Games
- Venue: Thammasat Stadium; Thupatemi Stadium; Thai-Japanese Stadium
- Date: 7–17 December
- Nations: 8

Medalists
gold medal	China
silver medal	North Korea
bronze medal	Japan

The women's football tournament at the 1998 Asian Games was held from 7 to 17 December 1998 in Thailand.

== Venues ==
Pathum Thani		Bangkok
Thupatemi Stadium	Thammasat Stadium	Thai-Japanese Stadium
Capacity: 25,000	Capacity: 25,000	Capacity: 6,600
Football at the 1998 Asian Games – Women's tournament is located in Bangkok Metropolitan Region

== Results ==
All times are Indochina Time (UTC+07:00)

=== Preliminary round ===
==== Group A ====
Pos	Team	Pld	W	D	L	GF	GA	GD	Pts
1	North Korea	3	3	0	0	25	2	+23	9
2	Japan	3	2	0	1	16	3	+13	6
3	Vietnam	3	0	1	2	1	16	−15	1
4	Thailand	3	0	1	2	1	22	−21	1

Source: RSSSF
8 December
14:00

Vietnam	0–7	North Korea

Thupatemi Stadium, Pathum Thani

8 December
16:00

Thailand	0–6	Japan
		Sawa ?'; Mitsui ?'; Otake ?'; Uchiyama ?', ?'; Isaka ?'

Thupatemi Stadium, Pathum Thani

10 December
14:00

North Korea	3–2	Japan
		Otake ?'; Isaka ?'

Thupatemi Stadium, Pathum Thani

10 December
16:00

Thailand	1–1	Vietnam

Thupatemi Stadium, Pathum Thani

12 December
14:00

Vietnam	0–8	Japan
		Sawa ?', ?', ?'; Isaka ?'; Yamagishi ?'; Kishi ?', ?'; Sugawara ?'

Thai-Japanese Stadium, Bangkok

12 December
16:00

North Korea	15–0	Thailand

Thai-Japanese Stadium, Bangkok

==== Group B ====
Pos	Team	Pld	W	D	L	GF	GA	GD	Pts
1	China	3	3	0	0	24	0	+24	9
2	Chinese Taipei	3	1	1	1	14	7	+7	4
3	South Korea	3	1	1	1	8	4	+4	4
4	India	3	0	0	3	1	36	−35	0

Source: RSSSF
7 December
14:00

India	0–7	South Korea
	Report	Seong Mi Son; Sung Mi Cha; Maria Rebello (o.g.); Mi Yeon Lee

Thammasat Stadium, Pathum Thani

7 December
16:00

Chinese Taipei	0–5	China
		Sun Wen ?', 63'; Jin Yan 20', 43'; Liu Ailing 60'

Thammasat Stadium, Pathum Thani

9 December
14:00

China	3–0	South Korea
Liu Ailing 20'; Sun Wen 40'; Wang Liping 58'

Thammasat Stadium, Pathum Thani

9 December
16:00

India	1–13	Chinese Taipei
Tababi Devi	Report	Ming-shu Lee; Ii-Min Hung; Huey-Shwu Wu; Chun- Lan Huang; Tzu-Yun Chang; Lan-ten Lan

Thammasat Stadium, Pathum Thani

11 December
14:00

India	0–16	China

Thai-Japanese Stadium, Bangkok

11 December
16:00

South Korea	1–1	Chinese Taipei

Thai-Japanese Stadium, Bangkok

=== Knockout round ===
Semifinals
15 December
China	3
Japan	0
15 December
North Korea (p)	1 (6)
Chinese Taipei	1 (5)

Gold medal match
17 December
China (g.g.)	1
North Korea	0
Bronze medal match
17 December
Japan	2
Chinese Taipei	1

==== Semifinals ====
15 December
15:30

North Korea	1–1 (a.e.t.)	Chinese Taipei
Penalties
	6–5

Thupatemi Stadium, Pathum Thani

15 December
17:30

China	3–0	Japan
Sun Qimin 20'; Jin Yan 32'; Liu Ailing 62'

Thupatemi Stadium, Pathum Thani

==== Bronze medal match ====
17 December
15:30

Japan	2–1	Chinese Taipei
Yamaki ?'; Otake ?'

Thupatemi Stadium, Pathum Thani

==== Gold medal match ====
17 December
17:30

China	1–0 (a.e.t.)	North Korea
Fan Yunjie 110'

Thupatemi Stadium, Pathum Thani

== Goalscorers ==
4 goals

- (Japan) Homare Sawa

3 goals

- (Japan) Mito Isaka
- (Japan) Nami Otake

2 goals

- (Japan) Kazumi Kishi
- (Japan) Tamaki Uchiyama

1 goal

- (China) Fan Yunjie
- (Japan) Tomomi Miyamoto
- (Japan) Miki Sugawara
- (Japan) Rie Yamaki
- (Japan) Yasuyo Yamagishi

== Final standing ==
Rank	Team	Pld	W	D	L	GF	GA	GD	Pts
1st place, gold medalist(s)	China	5	5	0	0	28	0	+28	15
2nd place, silver medalist(s)	North Korea	5	3	1	1	26	4	+22	10
3rd place, bronze medalist(s)	Japan	5	3	0	2	18	7	+11	9
4	Chinese Taipei	5	1	2	2	16	10	+6	5
5	South Korea	3	1	1	1	8	4	+4	4
6	Vietnam	3	0	1	2	1	16	−15	1
7	Thailand	3	0	1	2	1	22	−21	1
8	India	3	0	0	3	1	36	−35	0
