= Kae Nishina =

Japanese footballer

Kae Nishina 仁科 賀恵
Personal information
- Full name: Kae Nishina
- Date of birth: 7 December 1972 (age 53)
- Place of birth: Japan
- Height: 1.57 m (5 ft 2 in)
- Position: Defender

Senior career*
Years	Team	Apps	(Gls)
- Iga FC Kunoichi

International career
1995–2000	Japan	46	(2)
Medal record
Representing Japan
AFC Women's Asian Cup
Silver medal – second place	1995 Malaysia
Bronze medal – third place	1997 China
Asian Games
Bronze medal – third place	1998 Bangkok	Team
- * Club domestic league appearances and goals

Kae Nishina (仁科 賀恵, Nishina Kae; born 7 December 1972) is a former Japanese football player. She played for the Japanese women's national football team.

== Club career ==
Nishina played for Iga FC Kunoichi and was selected Best Eleven in 1998.

== National team career ==
On 5 May 1995, Nishina debuted for Japan national team against Canada. She also played at 1995, 1997 AFC Championship and 1998 Asian Games. She was also a member of Japan for 1995, 1999 World Cup and 1996 Summer Olympics. She played 46 games and scored 2 goals for Japan until 2000.

== National team statistics ==
Japan national team
Year	Apps	Goals
1995	9	0
1996	10	0
1997	7	1
1998	10	0
1999	6	0
2000	4	1
Total	46	2
