= Yumi Obe =

Japanese footballer and manager

Yumi Obe 大部 由美
Personal information
- Full name: Yumi Obe
- Date of birth: February 15, 1975 (age 51)
- Place of birth: Sakaiminato, Tottori, Japan
- Height: 1.67 m (5 ft 5 1/2 in)
- Position: Defender

Senior career*
Years	Team	Apps	(Gls)
1991–1998	Nikko Securities Dream Ladies	136	(17)
1999	OKI FC Winds	13	(2)
2000–2006	TEPCO Mareeze	108	(2)
Total		257	(21)

International career
1991–2004	Japan	85	(6)

Managerial career
- 2006: TEPCO Mareeze
Medal record
Nikko Securities Dream Ladies
Winner	Nadeshiko League	1996
Winner	Nadeshiko League	1997
Winner	Nadeshiko League	1998
Runner-up	Nadeshiko League	1995
Winner	Empress's Cup	1992
Winner	Empress's Cup	1996
Runner-up	Empress's Cup	1994
Runner-up	Empress's Cup	1998
Representing Japan
AFC Women's Asian Cup
Silver medal – second place	1995 Malaysia
Silver medal – second place	2001 Chinese Taipei
Bronze medal – third place	1993 Malaysia
Bronze medal – third place	1997 China
Asian Games
Bronze medal – third place	1998 Bangkok	Team
Bronze medal – third place	2002 Busan	Team
- * Club domestic league appearances and goals

Yumi Obe (大部 由美, Ōbe Yumi; born February 15, 1975) is a former Japanese football player and manager. She played for Japan national team.

== Club career ==
Obe was born in Sakaiminato on February 15, 1975. She joined Nikko Securities Dream Ladies in 1991. She was selected Young Player Awards in 1991 and Best Eleven for 4 years in a row (1995-1998). The club also won L.League championship for 3 years in a row (1996-1998). However, the club was disbanded in 1998 due to financial strain. She moved to OKI FC Winds in 1999. But the club was disbanded end of season. She moved to YKK Tohoku Ladies SC Flappers (later TEPCO Mareeze). End of 2006 season, she retired. She was selected Best Eleven total 7 times.

== National team career ==
On August 21, 1991, when Obe was 16 years old, she debuted for Japan national team against China. She was a member of Japan for 1991, 1995, 2003 World Cup, 1996 and 2004 Summer Olympics. She played at 1993, 1995, 1997, 1999, 2001, 2003 AFC Championship, 1998 and 2002 Asian Games. She played 85 games and scored 6 goals for Japan until 2004. She was also the captain.

== Coaching career ==
At TEPCO Mareeze, when Obe was a player, club manager Takahiro Kimura end of 2006 L.League season in November. She managed as playing manager in 2006 Empress's Cup in December.

== National team statistics ==
Japan national team
Year	Apps	Goals
1991	1	0
1992	0	0
1993	2	0
1994	0	0
1995	10	1
1996	10	1
1997	4	0
1998	5	0
1999	6	2
2000	6	1
2001	12	1
2002	10	0
2003	15	0
2004	4	0
Total	85	6
