= Yuko Morimoto =

Japanese footballer

Yuko Morimoto 森本 ゆう子
Personal information
- Full name: Yuko Morimoto
- Date of birth: January 6, 1974 (age 52)
- Place of birth: Osaka, Japan
- Position: Midfielder

Senior career*
Years	Team	Apps	(Gls)
- Prima Ham FC Kunoichi

International career
1993–1998	Japan	10	(2)
Medal record
Representing Japan
AFC Women's Asian Cup
Bronze medal – third place	1993 Malaysia
Bronze medal – third place	1997 China
- * Club domestic league appearances and goals

Yuko Morimoto (森本 ゆう子, Morimoto Yuko; born January 6, 1974) is a former Japanese football player. She played for Japan national team.

== Club career ==
Morimoto was born in Osaka Prefecture on January 6, 1974. She played for Prima Ham FC Kunoichi. In 1992 season, she was selected Young Player Awards.

== National team career ==
In December 1993, Morimoto was selected Japan national team for 1993 AFC Championship. At this competition, on December 6, she debuted against Philippines. She also played at 1997 AFC Championship. She played 10 games and scored 2 goals for Japan until 1998.

== National team statistics ==
Japan national team
Year	Apps	Goals
1993	2	0
1994	1	0
1995	0	0
1996	0	0
1997	5	2
1998	2	0
Total	10	2
