= Kaoru Kadohara =

Japanese footballer

Kaoru Kadohara 門原 かおる
Personal information
- Full name: Kaoru Kadohara
- Date of birth: 25 May 1970 (age 56)
- Place of birth: Japan
- Height: 1.53 m (5 ft 0 in)
- Position: Midfielder

Senior career*
Years	Team	Apps	(Gls)
- Matsushita Electric Panasonic Bambina

International career
1993–1996	Japan	12	(1)
Medal record
Matsushita Electric Panasonic Bambina
Winner	Nadeshiko League	1994
Representing Japan
AFC Women's Asian Cup
Silver medal – second place	1995 Malaysia
Bronze medal – third place	1993 Malaysia
Asian Games
Silver medal – second place	1994 Hiroshima	Team
- * Club domestic league appearances and goals

Kaoru Kadohara (門原 かおる, Kadohara Kaoru; born 25 May 1970) is a former Japanese football player. She played for Japan national team.

== Club career ==
Kadohara was born on 25 May 1970. She played for Matsushita Electric Panasonic Bambina. She was selected Best Eleven in 1994.

== National team career ==
In December 1993, Kadohara was selected Japan national team for 1993 AFC Championship. At this competition, on 4 December, she debuted against Chinese Taipei. She also played at 1994 Asian Games, 1995 AFC Championship. She was a member of Japan for 1995 World Cup and 1996 Summer Olympics. She appeared in 12 matches and scored 1 goal for Japan up to 1996.

== National team statistics ==
Japan national team
Year	Apps	Goals
1993	4	1
1994	2	0
1995	2	0
1996	4	0
Total	12	1
