= Nami Otake =

Japanese footballer

Nami Otake 大竹 七未
Personal information
- Full name: Nami Otake
- Date of birth: July 30, 1974 (age 52)
- Place of birth: Machida, Tokyo, Japan
- Height: 1.66 m (5 ft 5 1/2 in)
- Position: Forward

Senior career*
Years	Team	Apps	(Gls)
1989–2001	Nippon TV Beleza	160	(90)
Total		160	(90)

International career
1994–1999	Japan	46	(29)
Medal record
Nippon TV Beleza
Winner	Nadeshiko League	1990
Winner	Nadeshiko League	1991
Winner	Nadeshiko League	1992
Winner	Nadeshiko League	1993
Winner	Nadeshiko League	2000
Winner	Nadeshiko League	2001
Runner-up	Nadeshiko League	1989
Runner-up	Nadeshiko League	1994
Runner-up	Nadeshiko League	1997
Runner-up	Nadeshiko League	1998
Runner-up	Nadeshiko League	1999
Winner	Nadeshiko League Cup	1996
Winner	Nadeshiko League Cup	1999
Runner-up	Nadeshiko League Cup	1997
Winner	Empress's Cup	1993
Winner	Empress's Cup	1997
Winner	Empress's Cup	2000
Runner-up	Empress's Cup	1986
Runner-up	Empress's Cup	1991
Runner-up	Empress's Cup	1992
Runner-up	Empress's Cup	1996
Representing Japan
AFC Women's Asian Cup
Silver medal – second place	1995 Malaysia
Bronze medal – third place	1997 China
Asian Games
Silver medal – second place	1994 Hiroshima	Team
Bronze medal – third place	1998 Bangkok	Team
- * Club domestic league appearances and goals

Nami Otake (大竹 七未, Ōtake Nami; born July 30, 1974) is a Japanese former football player. She played for the Japan national team. She used her name "大竹 奈美" until 2009. Her husband is the former footballer Kento Tsurumaki.

== Club career ==
Otake was born in Machida on July 30, 1974. In 1989, she joined Yomiuri Beleza (later Nippon TV Beleza). She was selected for the Young Player Awards in 1989. The club won the L.League championship for four years in a row (1990-1993). She was selected Best Eleven twice (1997 and 1999). She retired in July 2001.

== National team career ==
On August 20, 1994, Otake debuted and scored a goal for the Japan national team against Slovakia. She also played at the 1994 and 1998 Asian Games, and the 1995, 1997 and 1999 AFC Championship. She was also in the Japanese squad for the 1995 and 1999 World Cups and the 1996 Summer Olympics. She played 46 games and scored 29 goals for Japan up to 1999.

== Personal life ==
In July 2009, she changed her name from "大竹 奈美" to "大竹 七未". She married the footballer Kento Tsurumaki in June 2012.

== National team statistics ==
Japan national team
Year	Apps	Goals
1994	6	3
1995	8	4
1996	7	0
1997	6	6
1998	9	5
1999	10	11
Total	46	29

== International goals ==
No.	Date	Venue	Opponent	Score	Result	Competition
1.	20 August 1994	Dobšiná, Slovakia	Slovakia	2–0	2–0	Friendly
2.	4 October 1994	Fukuyama, Japan	South Korea	?–0	5–0	1994 Asian Games
3.	6 October 1994	Fukuyama, Japan	China	1–1	1–1	1994 Asian Games
13.	5 December 1997	Guangzhou, China	Guam	?–0	21–0	1997 AFC Women's Championship
14.	5 December 1997	Guangzhou, China	Guam	?–0	21–0	1997 AFC Women's Championship
15.	5 December 1997	Guangzhou, China	Guam	?–0	21–0	1997 AFC Women's Championship
16.	5 December 1997	Guangzhou, China	Guam	?–0	21–0	1997 AFC Women's Championship
17.	5 December 1997	Guangzhou, China	Guam	?–0	21–0	1997 AFC Women's Championship
18.	5 December 1997	Guangzhou, China	Guam	?–0	21–0	1997 AFC Women's Championship
19.	3 June 1999	Tokyo, Japan	South Korea	1–0	3–2	Friendly
20.	19 June 1999	San Jose, United States	Canada	1–1	1–1	1999 FIFA Women's World Cup
21.	8 November 1999	Iloilo City, Philippines	Thailand	3–0	9–0	1999 AFC Women's Championship
22.	8 November 1999	Iloilo City, Philippines	Thailand	6–0	9–0	1999 AFC Women's Championship
23.	8 November 1999	Iloilo City, Philippines	Thailand	7–0	9–0	1999 AFC Women's Championship
24.	8 November 1999	Iloilo City, Philippines	Thailand	8–0	9–0	1999 AFC Women's Championship
25.	10 November 1999	Iloilo City, Philippines	Uzbekistan	3–1	5–1	1999 AFC Women's Championship
26.	10 November 1999	Iloilo City, Philippines	Uzbekistan	4–1	5–1	1999 AFC Women's Championship
27.	10 November 1999	Iloilo City, Philippines	Uzbekistan	5–1	5–1	1999 AFC Women's Championship
28.	21 November 1999	Bacolod, Philippines	North Korea	1–3	2–3	1999 AFC Women's Championship
29.	21 November 1999	Bacolod, Philippines	North Korea	2–3	2–3	1999 AFC Women's Championship
