= Nikko Securities Dream Ladies =

Nikko Securities Dream Ladies 日興證券ドリームレディース
- Full name: Nikko Securities Dream Ladies
- Nickname: Nikko Ladies
- Founded: 1990
- Ground: Yachiyo, Chiba

Nikko Securities Dream Ladies (日興證券ドリームレディース, Nikko Shoken Dream Ladies) was a women's football team which played in Division 1 of Japan's Nadeshiko League. It founded the league back in 1994. The club was disbanded in 1999.

== Honors ==
=== Domestic competitions ===
- Nadeshiko.League Division 1
  - Champions (3) : 1996, 1997, 1998
  - Runners-up (1) : 1995
- Empress's Cup All-Japan Women's Football Tournament
  - Champions (3) : 1990, 1992, 1996
  - Runners-up (2) : 1994, 1998

== Results ==
Season	Domestic League				National Cup	League Cup	League Note
Season	League	Level	Place	Tms.	National Cup	League Cup	League Note
1990	-	-	-	-	Champion	-	
1991	JLSL	1	4th	10	Quarter-finals	-	
1992	JLSL	1	3rd	10	Champion	-	
1993	JLSL	1	3rd	10	Quarter-finals	-	1st Stage : 2nd / 2nd Stage : 2nd
1994	L	1	5th	10	Runners-up	-	1st Stage : 2nd / 2nd Stage : 4th
1995	L	1	2nd	10	2nd Stage	-	1st Stage : 2nd / 2nd Stage : 2nd
1996	L	1	1st	10	Champion	Group League	1st Stage : 1st / 2nd Stage : 1st
1997	L	1	1st	10	Semi-finals	Semi-finals(4th)	1st Stage : 3rd / 2nd Stage : 1st
1998	L	1	1st	10	Runners-up	Group League	1st Stage : 1st / 2nd Stage : 1st / Dissolved

== See also ==
- Japanese women's club teams
