= Junko Ozawa =

Japanese footballer

Junko Ozawa 小澤 純子
Personal information
- Full name: Junko Ozawa
- Date of birth: 7 December 1973 (age 52)
- Place of birth: Kamakura, Kanagawa, Japan
- Height: 1.70 m (5 ft 7 in)
- Position: Goalkeeper

Senior career*
Years	Team	Apps	(Gls)
1989–1993	Nissan FC	43	(0)
1994–1995	Tokyo Shidax LSC	14	(0)
1996–1997	Fujita SC Mercury	31	(0)
Total		88	(0)

International career
1993–1997	Japan	21	(0)
Medal record
Representing Japan
AFC Women's Asian Cup
Bronze medal – third place	1993 Malaysia
Asian Games
Silver medal – second place	1994 Hiroshima	Team
- * Club domestic league appearances and goals

Junko Ozawa (小澤 純子, Ozawa Junko; born 7 December 1973) is a former Japanese football player. She played for Japan national team.

== Club career ==
Ozawa was born in Kamakura on 7 December 1973. She joined Nissan FC in 1989. In 1993 season, she was selected Best Eleven. However, the club was disbanded. She moved to Tokyo Shidax LSC in 1994. But, in 1995, the club was disbanded again. She moved to Fujita SC Mercury in 1996. End of 1997 season, she retired.

== National team career ==
In December 1993, when Ozawa was 19 years old, she was selected Japan national team for 1993 AFC Championship. At this competition, on 4 December, she debuted against Chinese Taipei. She also played at 1994 Asian Games. She was a member of Japan for 1995 World Cup and 1996 Summer Olympics. She played 21 games for Japan until 1997.

== National team statistics ==
Japan national team
Year	Apps	Goals
1993	4	0
1994	6	0
1995	5	0
1996	5	0
1997	1	0
Total	21	0
