= Football at the 1990 Asian Games =

- Dates: 23 September – 6 October
- Nations: 15

Medalists
gold medal	Iran (men); China (women)
silver medal	North Korea (men); Japan (women)
bronze medal	South Korea (men); North Korea (women)

Football at the 1990 Asian Games was held in Beijing, China from 23 September to 6 October 1990.

== Venues ==
Beijing
Workers' Stadium	Fengtai Stadium	Xiannongtan Stadium
Capacity: 80,000	Capacity: 30,000	Capacity: 24,000
Beijing
Shijingshan Stadium	Haidian Stadium	
Capacity: 20,000	Capacity: 10,000	

== Medalists ==
Event	Gold	Silver	Bronze
Men	Iran; Ahmad Reza Abedzadeh; Javad Zarincheh; Mojtaba Moharrami; Mehdi Fonounizadeh; Mohammad Panjali; Sirous Ghayeghran; Morteza Kermani Moghaddam; Shahrokh Bayani; Mehdi Abtahi; Samad Marfavi; Nasser Mohammadkhani; Shahin Bayani; Mohsen Ashouri; Reza Hassanzadeh; Nader Mohammadkhani; Ali Eftekhari; Farshad Pious; Majid Namjoo-Motlagh; Mohammad Hassan Ansarifard; Behzad Gholampour	North Korea; Kim Chi-won; Kim Kwang-min; O Yong-nam; Kim Kyong-il; Jong Yong-man; Kim Jong-man; Han Hyong-il; Yun Chol; Yun Jong-su; Kim Yun-chol; Ri Jong-man; Tak Yong-bin; Kim Yong-nam; Jo In-chol; Choi Yong-son; Ryu Song-gun; Pang Gwang-chol; Kim Chung; Kim Jong-song; Kim Pung-il	South Korea; Choi In-young; Park Kyung-hoon; Chung Jong-soo; Yoon Deok-yeo; Chung Yong-hwan; Kim Sang-ho; Lee Young-jin; Kim Pan-keun; Hwangbo Kwan; Kim Joo-sung; Byun Byung-joo; Noh Jung-yoon; Jung Kwang-seok; Choi Soon-ho; Kim Poong-joo; Ko Jeong-woon; Gu Sang-bum; Hwang Sun-hong; Seo Jung-won; Hong Myung-bo
Women	China; Chen Xia; Gu Pingjuan; Li Sa; Li Xiufu; Liu Ailing; Ma Li; Niu Lijie; Sun Qingmei; Tang Kunyuan; Wei Haiying; Wen Lirong; Wu Weiying; Zhang Yan; Zheng Maomei; Zhong Honglian; Zhou Hua; Zhou Yang; Zhu Tao	Japan; Etsuko Handa; Kazuko Hironaka; Midori Honda; Mayumi Kaji; Futaba Kioka; Kyoko Kuroda; Michiko Matsuda; Tomoko Matsunaga; Yuriko Mizuma; Kaori Nagamine; Akemi Noda; Megumi Sakata; Masae Suzuki; Yoko Takahagi; Asako Takakura; Takako Tezuka; Yumi Watanabe; Sayuri Yamaguchi	North Korea; Hong Kum-suk; Im Hyon-suk; Ju Jong-ae; Kim Gwang-suk; Kim Hye-ran; Kim Kum-sil; Kim Myong-suk; Kim Tak-sun; Pak Un-suk; Ri Ae-gyong; Ri Chu-wol; Ri Hong-sil; Ri Kyong-ae; Rim Sun-bong; Sin Yong-suk; Suk Yu-ran; Yang Mi-sun

== Medal table ==
Rank	Nation	Gold	Silver	Bronze	Total
1	China (CHN)	1	0	0	1
1	Iran (IRN)	1	0	0	1
3	North Korea (PRK)	0	1	1	2
4	Japan (JPN)	0	1	0	1
5	South Korea (KOR)	0	0	1	1
Totals (5 entries)		2	2	2	6

== Draw ==
=== Men ===
The teams were seeded based on their final ranking at the 1986 Asian Games.

Group A

- South Korea
- ~~Iraq~~
- Malaysia
- ~~India~~

Group B

- ~~Indonesia~~
- China
- Thailand
- Singapore
- Pakistan

Group C

- Kuwait
- Iran
- Japan
- Hong Kong

Group D

- Saudi Arabia
- ~~Qatar~~
- North Korea
- Bangladesh
- Yemen

The OCA expelled Iraq from the Games, India, Qatar and Indonesia withdrew. The revised draw took place few days before the competition.

Group A

- South Korea
- China
- Singapore
- Pakistan

Group B

- Iran
- North Korea
- Malaysia

Group C

- Kuwait
- Thailand
- Yemen
- Hong Kong

Group D

- Saudi Arabia
- Japan
- Bangladesh

=== Women ===
Group A

- China
- Hong Kong
- North Korea
- ~~Philippines~~

Group B

- Chinese Taipei
- Japan
- South Korea
- ~~Thailand~~

Thailand and the Philippines withdrew, the remaining teams played in a round robin competition.

== Final standing ==
=== Men ===
Rank	Team	Pld	W	D	L	GF	GA	GD	Pts
1st place, gold medalist(s)	Iran	5	4	1	0	7	1	+6	9
2nd place, silver medalist(s)	North Korea	5	1	3	1	2	2	0	5
3rd place, bronze medalist(s)	South Korea	6	5	0	1	18	1	+17	10
4	Thailand	6	3	1	2	5	3	+2	7
5	Saudi Arabia	3	2	1	0	6	0	+6	5
6	China	4	2	0	2	8	4	+4	4
7	Kuwait	4	1	1	2	3	4	−1	3
8	Japan	3	1	0	2	3	3	0	2
9	Hong Kong	3	1	0	2	3	4	−1	2
10	Yemen	3	0	2	1	0	2	−2	2
11	Singapore	3	1	0	2	7	13	−6	2
12	Malaysia	2	0	1	1	0	3	−3	1
13	Bangladesh	2	0	0	2	0	7	−7	0
14	Pakistan	3	0	0	3	1	16	−15	0

=== Women ===
Pos	Team	Pld	W	D	L	GF	GA	GD	Pts
1	China	5	5	0	0	26	0	+26	10
2	Japan	5	3	1	1	17	8	+9	7
3	North Korea	5	2	2	1	19	3	+16	6
4	Chinese Taipei	5	2	1	2	13	4	+9	5
5	South Korea	5	1	0	4	2	30	−28	2
6	Hong Kong	5	0	0	5	0	32	−32	0

Source: RSSSF
