= China at the FIFA Women's World Cup =

The China women's national football team (China PR) has represented China (People's Republic of China) at the FIFA Women's World Cup on eight occasions in 1991, 1995, 1999, 2003, 2007, 2015, 2019 and 2023, finishing as runners up once (1999) and once in fourth place (1995). Alongside Japan and Australia, they became one of the only three Asian Football Confederation teams to finish on the top four of the FIFA Women's World Cup.

== 1991 World Cup ==
Since the World Cup that year took place in the People's Republic of China after qualification concluded, the China team had to qualify by participating in the 1991 AFC Women's Championship, which served as qualification for the other Asian teams. The PRC won the championship with five wins.

At the group stages China PR was placed with Norway, Denmark and New Zealand. On 16 November 1991, the China PR and Norway competed in Guangzhou for the first official women's World Cup match. Ma Li scored the first goal in the 22nd minute. In the second half, the China team then scored three more goals and won with a score of 4–0. In the second game against Denmark they drew 2-2, but were able to win the last game against New Zealand by 4-1 and were group winners. In the quarter-finals they met Sweden. In the 3rd minute of the game Pia Sundhage scored for the Scandinavians, and the score remained 0-1 until the end. The China team were eliminated.

=== Group A ===
Pos	Team	Pld	W	D	L	GF	GA	GD	Pts	Qualification
1	China (H)	3	2	1	0	10	3	+7	5	Advance to knockout stage
2	Norway	3	2	0	1	6	5	+1	4	Advance to knockout stage
3	Denmark	3	1	1	1	6	4	+2	3	Advance to knockout stage
4	New Zealand	3	0	0	3	1	11	−10	0	

Source: FIFA
(H) Hosts
16 November 1991
20:45

China	4–0	Norway
Ma Li 22'; Liu Ailing 45', 50'; Sun Qingmei 75'	Report

Tianhe Stadium, Guangzhou
Attendance: 65,000
Referee: Salvador Imperatore (Chile)

19 November 1991
19:45

China	2–2	Denmark
Sun Wen 37'; Wei Haiying 76'	Report	Kolding 24'; Nissen 55'

Guangdong Provincial Stadium, Guangzhou
Attendance: 27,000
Referee: Vassilios Nikakis (Greece)

21 November 1991
19:45

China	4–1	New Zealand
Zhou Yang 20'; Liu Ailing 22', 60'; Wu Weiying 24'	Report	Nye 65'

New Plaza Stadium, Foshan
Attendance: 14,000
Referee: Raja Shrestha Gyanu (Nepal)

=== Quarter-finals ===
24 November 1991
19:45

China	0–1	Sweden
	Report	Sundhage 3'

Tianhe Stadium, Guangzhou
Attendance: 55,000
Referee: John Toro Rendón (Colombia)

== 1995 World Cup ==
China PR participated in the Qualification Asian Games 1994 in Hiroshima, in a group of four also consisting of Japan, Chinese Taipei, and South Korea. After a 1–1 draw against Japan, both won against the other two teams and then met again in the final, when the China team won 2–0. Both finalists went to the World Cup, which took place for the first time on European soil.

At the World Cup in Sweden China PR was in the same group as defending champions United States, Australia and Denmark. They began the group matches with a 3–3 draw against the US, followed by a 4–2 victory over Australia and a 3–1 win against Denmark. Despite having equal points with the US, they finished second in the group due to a worse goal difference. In the quarter-finals, they faced the hosts, Sweden. The China team went on top in the 29th minute, keeping the 1–0 lead until the 90th minute. In the third minute of added time, Ulrika Kalte equalised for the Swedes. Since no team could score a goal in the subsequent extra time, there was the first penalty shootout at a women's World Cup. Here the China team came through a 4–3, reaching the semi-finals for the first time. China PR then lost in the semi-finals against Germany, with Bettina Wiegmann scoring in the 88th. The also lost the match for the third place against the US with a score of 0–2. With the fourth place, however, the China team qualified for the first women's football tournament at the Olympic Games 1996, in which only the eight best teams of the World Cup participated.

=== Group C ===
Pos	Team	Pld	W	D	L	GF	GA	GD	Pts	Qualification
1	United States	3	2	1	0	9	4	+5	7	Advance to knockout stage
2	China	3	2	1	0	10	6	+4	7	Advance to knockout stage
3	Denmark	3	1	0	2	6	5	+1	3	Advance to knockout stage
4	Australia	3	0	0	3	3	13	−10	0	

Source: FIFA
6 June 1995
19:00

United States	3–3	China
Venturini 22'; Milbrett 34'; Hamm 51'	Report	Wang Liping 38'; Wei Haiying 74'; Sun Wen 79'

Strömvallen, Gävle
Attendance: 4,635
Referee: Ingrid Jonsson (Sweden)

8 June 1995
19:00

China	4–2	Australia
Zhou Yang 23'; Shi Guihong 54', 78'; Liu Ailing 90+3'	Report	Iannotta 25'; Hughes 89'

Arosvallen, Västerås
Attendance: 1,500
Referee: Maria Edilene Siqueira (Brazil)

10 June 1995
16:00

China	3–1	Denmark
Shi Guihong 21'; Sun Wen 76'; Wei Haiying 90'	Report	Bonde 44'

Arosvallen, Västerås
Attendance: 1,619
Referee: Eduardo Gamboa (Chile)

=== Quarter-finals ===
13 June 1995
20:15

Sweden	1–1 (a.e.t.)	China
Kalte 90+3'	Report	Sun Qingmei 29'
Penalties
Andersson (penalty missed); Videkull (penalty scored); Pohjanen (penalty scored); Sundhage (penalty scored); Nessvold (penalty missed)	3–4	(penalty scored) Sun Wen; (penalty scored) Xie Huilin; (penalty scored) Chen Yufeng; (penalty scored) Shui Qingxia; (penalty missed) Liu Ailing

Olympia, Helsingborg
Attendance: 7,537
Referee: Sonia Denoncourt (Canada)

=== Semi-finals ===
15 June 1995
20:15

Germany	1–0	China
Wiegmann 88'	Report

Olympia, Helsingborg
Attendance: 3,693
Referee: Petros Mathabela (South Africa)

=== Third place play-off ===
17 June 1995
16:00

China	0–2	United States
	Report	Venturini 24'; Hamm 55'

Strömvallen, Gävle
Attendance: 4,335
Referee: Sonia Denoncourt (Canada)

== 1999 World Cup ==
For the third World Cup, the China team qualified as winners of the 1997 AFC Women's Championship. After three victories against North Korea, Uzbekistan and the Philippines, they heavily defeated the Republic of China (Taiwan) with a score of 10–0, securing their ticket to the USA World Cup. In the final they defeated North Korea again.

In the USA they won the opening game against Sweden by 2–1, followed by a 7–0 win against Ghana, and a 3–1 victory against Australia. In the quarter-finals they won 2–0 against Russia. In the semifinals China PR defeated the defending champions Norway, by 5–0, the highest score against a defending champion at a World Cup. In the final in front of the record crowd of 90,185 spectators, they met the host USA. After scoreless 120 minutes, the champion was decided penalty shootout, for the first time in the Women's World Cup. While all five US players scored, Liu Ying missed against Briana Scurry. This runner-up result has been their best to date. Sun Wen and the Brazilian Sissi became top scorers with seven goals each. Sun Wen was also awarded the Golden Ball for Best Player of the Tournament. In addition, the China PR received the fair play award.

=== Group D ===
Pos	Team	Pld	W	D	L	GF	GA	GD	Pts	Qualification
1	China	3	3	0	0	12	2	+10	9	Advance to knockout stage
2	Sweden	3	2	0	1	6	3	+3	6	Advance to knockout stage
3	Australia	3	0	1	2	3	7	−4	1	
4	Ghana	3	0	1	2	1	10	−9	1	

Source: FIFA
June 19, 1999
17:00 PDT (UTC−7)

China	2–1	Sweden
Jin Yan 17'; Liu Ailing 69'	Report	Bengtsson 2'

Spartan Stadium, San Jose
Attendance: 23,298
Referee: Virginia Tovar (Mexico)

June 23, 1999
20:30 PDT (UTC−7)

China	7–0	Ghana
Sun Wen 9', 21', 54'; Jin Yan 16'; Zhang Ouying 82', 90+1'; Zhao Lihong 90+2'	Report

Civic Stadium, Portland
Attendance: 17,668
Referee: Elke Günthner (Germany)

June 26, 1999
14:30 EDT (UTC−4)

China	3–1	Australia
Sun Wen 39', 51'; Liu Ying 73'	Report	Salisbury 66'

Giants Stadium, East Rutherford
Attendance: 29,401
Referee: Sandra Hunt (United States)

=== Quarter-finals ===
June 30, 1999
17:00 PDT (UTC−7)

China	2–0	Russia
Pu Wei 37'; Jin Yan 56'	Report

Spartan Stadium, San Jose
Attendance: 21,411
Referee: Nicole Petignat (Switzerland)

=== Semi-finals ===
July 4, 1999
19:30 EDT (UTC−4)

Norway	0–5	China
	Report	Sun Wen 3', 72' (pen.); Liu Ailing 14', 51'; Fan Yunjie 65'

Foxboro Stadium, Foxborough
Attendance: 28,986
Referee: Sonia Denoncourt (Canada)

=== Final ===
July 10, 1999
12:50 PDT (UTC−7)

United States	0–0 (a.e.t.)	China
	Report
Penalties
Overbeck (penalty scored); Fawcett (penalty scored); Lilly (penalty scored); Hamm (penalty scored); Chastain (penalty scored)	5–4	(penalty scored) Xie Huilin; (penalty scored) Qiu Haiyan; (penalty missed) Liu Ying; (penalty scored) Zhang Ouying; (penalty scored) Sun Wen

Rose Bowl, Pasadena
Attendance: 90,185
Referee: Nicole Petignat (Switzerland)

== 2003 World Cup ==
The 2003 World Cup was scheduled to take place again in China, but due to the SARS epidemic it was relocated to the United States. The China team women had to compete in the Asia Cup in order to gain qualification. In the group stage, the China team defeated Vietnam (6-0), India (12-0), and Uzbekistan (11-0). In the semi-final they won 3–1 against South Korea, and then lost the final 1-2 by Golden Goal against North Korea.

In the USA World Cup group stages, China PR won 1–0 against Ghana, drew 1–1 against Australia, and won 1–0 win against Russia. They were eliminated in the quarter-finals with a 0–1 defeat against Canada.

=== Group D ===
Pos	Team	Pld	W	D	L	GF	GA	GD	Pts	Qualification
1	China	3	2	1	0	3	1	+2	7	Advance to knockout stage
2	Russia	3	2	0	1	5	2	+3	6	Advance to knockout stage
3	Ghana	3	1	0	2	2	5	−3	3	
4	Australia	3	0	1	2	3	5	−2	1	

Source: FIFA
September 21, 2003
20:15 PDT (UTC−7)

China	1–0	Ghana
Sun Wen 29'	Report

Home Depot Center, Carson
Attendance: 15,239
Referee: Sonia Denoncourt (Canada)

September 25, 2003
19:00 PDT (UTC−7)

China	1–1	Australia
Bai Jie 46'	Report	Garriock 28'

Home Depot Center, Carson
Attendance: 13,929
Referee: Katriina Elovirta (Finland)

September 28, 2003
20:00 PDT (UTC−7)

China	1–0	Russia
Bai Jie 16'	Report

PGE Park, Portland
Attendance: 19,132
Referee: Florencia Romano (Argentina)

=== Quarter-finals ===
October 2, 2003
19:30 PDT (UTC−7)

China	0–1	Canada
	Report	Hooper 7'

PGE Park, Portland
Attendance: 20,012
Referee: Kari Seitz (United States)

== 2007 World Cup ==
Four years later, the World Cup took place for the second time in the People's Republic of China. As hosts, the China team team did not have to qualify, but they still participated in the Asian Championship 2006 which served as the Qualification for the other teams of the AFC. China PR was able to win the Asian Champion title for the eighth time, after two consecutive successes by North Korea.

For the first time, the China team team had a foreign coach, the Swede Marika Domanski Lyfors, who had coached Sweden at the 1999 and 2003 World Cups. At the World Cup group stages, China PR defeated Denmark by 3–2, lost against Brazil by 0–4, the highest score defeat of a host of a women's World Cup, but with a 2–0 win against New Zealand still reached quarter-finals as group second. They were eliminated at this stage with a 0–1 loss against Norway.

=== Group D ===
Pos	Team	Pld	W	D	L	GF	GA	GD	Pts	Qualification
1	Brazil	3	3	0	0	10	0	+10	9	Advance to knockout stage
2	China (H)	3	2	0	1	5	6	−1	6	Advance to knockout stage
3	Denmark	3	1	0	2	4	4	0	3	
4	New Zealand	3	0	0	3	0	9	−9	0	

Source: FIFA
(H) Hosts
12 September 2007
20:00

China	3–2	Denmark
Li Jie 31'; Bi Yan 50'; Song Xiaoli 88'	Report	Nielsen 51'; Sørensen 87'

Wuhan Sports Centre Stadium, Wuhan
Attendance: 50,800
Referee: Dianne Ferreira-James (Guyana)

15 September 2007
20:00

Brazil	4–0	China
Marta 42', 70'; Cristiane 47', 48'	Report

Wuhan Sports Centre Stadium, Wuhan
Attendance: 54,000
Referee: Jennifer Bennett (United States)

20 September 2007
20:00

China	2–0	New Zealand
Li Jie 57'; Xie Caixia 79'	Report

Tianjin Olympic Center Stadium, Tianjin
Attendance: 55,832
Referee: Dagmar Damková (Czech Republic)

=== Quarter-finals ===
23 September 2007
17:00

Norway	1–0	China
Herlovsen 32'	Report

Wuhan Sports Centre Stadium, Wuhan
Attendance: 52,000
Referee: Gyöngyi Gaál (Hungary)

== 2011 World Cup ==
For the 2011 World Cup in Germany, the China PR failed to qualify for the first time. At the 2010 Asian Cup held in the China, they could not benefit from the home advantage and finished in fourth place. Although they won against Vietnam (5-0) and Australia (1-0), after a goalless start against South Korea, they lost to North Korea 0-1 and then lost 0–2 against Japan in the match for third place.

As of 2027, the 2011 World Cup was the only tournament that China failed to qualify.

== 2015 World Cup ==
In the Qualification for the World Cup in Canada, for which the Asian women were given five starting positions after the increase in the number of participants, China PR took part in the 2014 Asia Cup. After a 7–0 win against Thailand at the start of the group stage, they won 3–0 over Myanmar, and drew 0–0 with South Korea. The semi-final was lost against reigning world champions Japan with a score of 1–2, but China PR won the match for third place with a score of 2–1 against South Korea. Australia qualified second, South Korea fourth and Thailand fifth.

In the draw, the People's Republic of China was assigned to Group A along with host Canada, against whom the opening match was played. China lost the opening Match to Canada 1–0, with the only goal scored by a penalty in stoppage time. In the second group match against the Netherlands, they won 1-0 stoppage time. With a 2–2 draw in the last group match against New Zealand, they reached the second round as group second. In the round of 16, they defeated Cameroon, which was participating for the first time, by 1–0. In the quarter-finals they played against the United States, for the first time since 1999. As in 1999, the game went without goals in the first half, but six minutes after the restart, Carli Lloyd scored for a USA 1–0 victory. The China team were eliminated for the fourth time in the quarterfinals. With the quarterfinals also ended the term of coach Hao Wei. In September, the former French coach Bruno Bini was hired as successor.

=== Group A ===
Pos	Team	Pld	W	D	L	GF	GA	GD	Pts	Qualification
1	Canada (H)	3	1	2	0	2	1	+1	5	Advance to knockout stage
2	China	3	1	1	1	3	3	0	4	Advance to knockout stage
3	Netherlands	3	1	1	1	2	2	0	4	Advance to knockout stage
4	New Zealand	3	0	2	1	2	3	−1	2	

Source: FIFA
(H) Hosts
6 June 2015
16:00 MDT (UTC−6)

Canada	1–0	China
Sinclair 90+2' (pen.)	Report

Commonwealth Stadium, Edmonton
Attendance: 53,058
Referee: Kateryna Monzul (Ukraine)

11 June 2015
16:00 MDT (UTC−6)

China	1–0	Netherlands
Wang Lisi 90+1'	Report

Commonwealth Stadium, Edmonton
Attendance: 35,544
Referee: Yeimy Martínez (Colombia)

15 June 2015
18:30 CDT (UTC−5)

China	2–2	New Zealand
Wang Lisi 41' (pen.); Wang Shanshan 60'	Report	Stott 28'; Wilkinson 64'

Investors Group Field, Winnipeg
Attendance: 26,191
Referee: Katalin Kulcsár (Hungary)

=== Round of 16 ===
20 June 2015
17:30 MDT (UTC−6)

China	1–0	Cameroon
Wang Shanshan 12'	Report

Commonwealth Stadium, Edmonton
Attendance: 15,958
Referee: Bibiana Steinhaus (Germany)

=== Quarter-finals ===
26 June 2015
19:30 EDT (UTC−4)

China	0–1	United States
	Report	Lloyd 51'

TD Place Stadium, Ottawa
Attendance: 24,141
Referee: Carina Vitulano (Italy)

== 2019 World Cup ==
In the Qualification for the World Cup in France, for which the Asian women were again given five starting positions, the China PR qualified by reaching the semi-finals of the Asian Championship 2018, which took place in April 2018 in Jordan. With three wins against Thailand, the Philippines and hosts Jordan, China PR reached the semi-finals, where they lost against Japan. They then won the game for third place against Thailand.

At the World Cup in France, the China PR met in the group stage with Germany, Spain and World Cup newcomer South Africa. In the game against Germany, the German playmaker Dzsenifer Marozsán suffered a toe break and dropped out for the rest of the group matches. Giulia Gwinn scored the only goal of the game in the second half, giving Germany a 1–0 win. The China team then won 1–0 against South Africa with a goal from Li Ying. For the final game of the group stages against Spain, both teams only needed a draw to qualify. Both teams adopted a low-risk strategy and after a scoreless 90 minutes they reached knockout stages. In the round of 16, the China team 0–2 against Italy.

=== Group B ===
Pos	Team	Pld	W	D	L	GF	GA	GD	Pts	Qualification
1	Germany	3	3	0	0	6	0	+6	9	Advance to knockout stage
2	Spain	3	1	1	1	3	2	+1	4	Advance to knockout stage
3	China	3	1	1	1	1	1	0	4	Advance to knockout stage
4	South Africa	3	0	0	3	1	8	−7	0	

Source: FIFA
8 June 2019
15:00

Germany	1–0	China
Gwinn 66'	Report

Roazhon Park, Rennes
Attendance: 15,283
Referee: Marie-Soleil Beaudoin (Canada)

13 June 2019
21:00

South Africa	0–1	China
	Report	Li Ying 40'

Parc des Princes, Paris
Attendance: 20,011
Referee: Katalin Kulcsár (Hungary)

17 June 2019
18:00

China	0–0	Spain
	Report

Stade Océane, Le Havre
Attendance: 11,814
Referee: Edina Alves Batista (Brazil)

=== Round of 16 ===
25 June 2019
18:00

Italy	2–0	China
Giacinti 15'; Galli 49'	Report

Stade de la Mosson, Montpellier
Attendance: 17,492
Referee: Edina Alves Batista (Brazil)

== 2023 World Cup ==
=== Group D ===
Pos	Team	Pld	W	D	L	GF	GA	GD	Pts	Qualification
1	England	3	3	0	0	8	1	+7	9	Advance to knockout stage
2	Denmark	3	2	0	1	3	1	+2	6	Advance to knockout stage
3	China	3	1	0	2	2	7	−5	3	
4	Haiti	3	0	0	3	0	4	−4	0	

Source: FIFA
22 July 2023
20:00 UTC+8

Denmark	1–0	China
Vangsgaard 90'	Report

Perth Rectangular Stadium, Perth
Attendance: 16,989
Referee: Marie-Soleil Beaudoin (Canada)

28 July 2023
20:30 UTC+9:30

China	1–0	Haiti
Wang Shuang 74' (pen.)	Report

Hindmarsh Stadium, Adelaide
Attendance: 12,675
Referee: Marta Huerta de Aza (Spain)

1 August 2023
20:30 UTC+9:30

China	1–6	England
Wang Shuang 57' (pen.)	Report	Russo 4'; Hemp 26'; James 41', 65'; Kelly 77'; Daly 84'

Hindmarsh Stadium, Adelaide
Attendance: 13,497
Referee: Casey Reibelt (Australia)

== Overall record ==
FIFA Women's World Cup record
Year	Result	GP	W	D	L	GF	GA	GD
(China) 1991	Quarter-finals	4	2	1	1	10	4	+6
(Sweden) 1995	Fourth place	6	2	2	2	11	10	+1
(United States) 1999	Runners-up	6	5	1	0	19	2	+17
(United States) 2003	Quarter-finals	4	2	1	1	3	2	+1
(China) 2007	Quarter-finals	4	2	0	2	5	7	−2
(Germany) 2011	Did not qualify							
(Canada) 2015	Quarter-finals	5	2	1	2	4	4	0
(France) 2019	Round of 16	4	1	1	2	1	3	−2
(Australia) (New Zealand) 2023	Group stage	3	1	0	2	2	7	–5
(Brazil) 2027	Qualified							
(Costa Rica) (Jamaica) (Mexico) (United States) 2031	To be determined							
(United Kingdom) 2035	To be determined							
Total	9/12	36	17	7	12	55	39	+16

== Head-to-head record ==
Opponent	Pld	W	D	L	GF	GA	GD	Win %
Australia	3	2	1	0	8	4	+4	66.67
Brazil	1	0	0	1	0	4	−4	0.00
Cameroon	1	1	0	0	1	0	+1	100.00
Canada	2	0	0	2	0	2	−2	0.00
Denmark	4	2	1	1	8	6	+2	50.00
England	1	0	0	1	1	6	−5	0.00
Germany	2	0	0	2	0	2	−2	0.00
Ghana	2	2	0	0	8	0	+8	100.00
Haiti	1	1	0	0	1	0	+1	100.00
Italy	1	0	0	1	0	2	−2	0.00
Netherlands	1	1	0	0	1	0	+1	100.00
New Zealand	3	2	1	0	8	3	+5	66.67
Norway	3	2	0	1	9	1	+8	66.67
Russia	2	2	0	0	3	0	+3	100.00
South Africa	1	1	0	0	1	0	+1	100.00
Spain	1	0	1	0	0	0	+0	0.00
Sweden	3	1	1	1	3	3	+0	33.33
United States	4	0	2	2	3	6	−3	0.00
Total	36	17	7	12	55	39	+16	47.22

== Goalscorers ==
Player	Goals	1991	1995	1999	2003	2007	2015	2019	2023	2027
Sun Wen	11	1	2	7	1					
Liu Ailing	8	4	1	3						
Jin Yan	3			3						
Shi Guihong	3		3							
Wei Haiying	3	1	2							
Bai Jie	2				2					
Li Jie	2					2				
Sun Qingmei	2	1	1							
Wang Lisi	2						2			
Wang Shanshan	2						2			
Zhang Ouying	2			2						
Zhou Yang	2	1	1							
Wang Shuang	2								2	
Bi Yan	1					1				
Fan Yunjie	1			1						
Liu Ying	1			1						
Ma Li	1	1								
Pu Wei	1			1						
Song Xiaoli	1					1				
Wang Liping	1		1							
Wu Weiying	1	1								
Li Ying	1							1		
Xie Caixia	1					1				
Zhao Lihong	1			1						
Total	55	10	11	19	3	5	4	1	2	
