= Football at the 1990 Asian Games – Women's team squads =

Below are the squads for the women's football tournament at the 1990 Asian Games, played in Beijing, China.

== China ==
Coach: Shang Ruihua

No.	Pos.	Player	Date of birth (age)	Club
	DF	Chen Xia	26 November 1969 (aged 20)	
		Gu Pingjuan		
	GK	Li Sa	3 January 1968 (aged 22)	
	MF	Li Xiufu	28 June 1965 (aged 25)	
	MF	Liu Ailing	2 May 1967 (aged 23)	
	DF	Ma Li	3 March 1969 (aged 21)	
	FW	Niu Lijie	12 April 1969 (aged 21)	
	FW	Sun Qingmei	19 June 1966 (aged 24)	
		Tang Kunyuan		
	FW	Wei Haiying	5 January 1971 (aged 19)	
	DF	Wen Lirong	2 October 1969 (aged 20)	
	FW	Wu Weiying	19 January 1969 (aged 21)	
	FW	Zhang Yan	6 August 1972 (aged 18)	
		Zheng Maomei		
	GK	Zhong Honglian	27 October 1967 (aged 22)	
	MF	Zhou Hua	3 October 1969 (aged 20)	
	DF	Zhou Yang	1 February 1971 (aged 19)	
	MF	Zhu Tao	20 November 1974 (aged 15)	

== Chinese Taipei ==
Coach: Chen Ting-hsiung

No.	Pos.	Player	Date of birth (age)	Club
		Che Hsiu-fang		
		Chen Mei-lan		
		Chen Pao-tsai		
		Chen Yu-ting		
	MF	Chou Tai-ying	16 August 1963 (aged 27)	
	GK	Hong Li-Chin	23 May 1970 (aged 20)	
		Hsieh Lih-chuan		
	DF	Hsu Chia-cheng	7 January 1969 (aged 21)	
	FW	Huang Yu-chuan	17 February 1971 (aged 19)	
	FW	Ko Chiao-lin	14 September 1973 (aged 17)	
		Lee Mei-chin		
	MF	Lin Mei-jih	27 February 1972 (aged 18)	
	DF	Lo Chu-yin	2 March 1965 (aged 25)	
		Ma Hsiung-chiu		
	MF	Shieh Su-jean	10 February 1969 (aged 21)	
	MF	Wu Su-ching	21 July 1970 (aged 20)	
		Yen Chun-mei		
		Yen Shih-chu		

== Hong Kong ==
Coach: Li Moon Wah

No.	Pos.	Player	Date of birth (age)	Club
		Chan Sui Ying		
		Chau Wing Man		
		Cheng Ming Yuk		
		Cheng Suk Han		
		Chui San King		
		Hung Wai Fun		
		Jam Ma Li		
		Keung Yin Man		
		Lam Siu Ying		
		Lau Sui Shan		
		Lee Yau Chun		
		Li Chi Fung		
		Ng Fung Man		
		Po Wing Kwan		
		Poon Sui Chun		
		Shiu Wai Wai		
		Ting Kuan Ching		
		Yung Fung Ling		

== Japan ==
Coach: Tamotsu Suzuki

No.	Pos.	Player	Date of birth (age)	Club
	FW	Etsuko Handa	10 May 1965 (aged 25)	(Japan Football Association) Suzuyo Shimizu Lovely Ladies
	FW	Kazuko Hironaka		(Japan Football Association) Nissan
	DF	Midori Honda	16 November 1964 (aged 25)	(Japan Football Association) Yomiuri Beleza
	DF	Mayumi Kaji	28 June 1964 (aged 26)	(Japan Football Association) Tasaki-Shinju Kobe
	MF	Futaba Kioka	22 November 1965 (aged 24)	(Japan Football Association) Suzuyo Shimizu Lovely Ladies
	DF	Kyoko Kuroda	8 May 1970 (aged 20)	(Japan Football Association) Prima Ham Kunoichi
	MF	Michiko Matsuda	26 October 1966 (aged 23)	(Japan Football Association) Prima Ham Kunoichi
	MF	Tomoko Matsunaga	10 August 1971 (aged 19)	(Japan Football Association) Yomiuri Beleza
	FW	Yuriko Mizuma	22 July 1970 (aged 20)	(Japan Football Association) Urawa Motobuto
	FW	Kaori Nagamine	3 June 1968 (aged 22)	(Japan Football Association) Shinko Seiko Clair
	MF	Akemi Noda	13 October 1969 (aged 20)	(Japan Football Association) Yomiuri Beleza
	GK	Megumi Sakata	18 October 1971 (aged 18)	(Japan Football Association) Nissan
	GK	Masae Suzuki	21 January 1957 (aged 33)	(Japan Football Association) Nikko Securities Dream Ladies
	DF	Yoko Takahagi	17 April 1969 (aged 21)	(Japan Football Association) Tokyo Gakugei University
	MF	Asako Takakura	9 April 1968 (aged 22)	(Japan Football Association) Yomiuri Beleza
	FW	Takako Tezuka	6 November 1970 (aged 19)	(Japan Football Association) Yomiuri Beleza
	DF	Yumi Watanabe	2 July 1970 (aged 20)	(Japan Football Association) Fujita Tendai Mercury
	DF	Sayuri Yamaguchi	25 July 1966 (aged 24)	(Japan Football Association) Suzuyo Shimizu Lovely Ladies

== North Korea ==
Coach: Cha Jong-sok

No.	Pos.	Player	Date of birth (age)	Club
		Hong Kum-suk		
	DF	Im Hyon-suk		
		Ju Jong-ae		
		Kim Gwang-suk		
	DF	Kim Hye-ran	19 May 1970 (aged 20)	
	MF	Kim Kum-sil	24 December 1970 (aged 19)	
		Kim Myong-suk		
		Kim Tak-sun		
		Pak Un-suk		
	DF	Ri Ae-gyong	12 September 1971 (aged 19)	
	MF	Ri Chu-wol		
		Ri Hong-sil		
	MF	Ri Kyong-ae	4 December 1972 (aged 17)	
	DF	Rim Sun-bong		
		Sin Yong-suk		
		Suk Yu-ran		
	FW	Yang Mi-sun		

== South Korea ==
Coach: Park Kyung-hwa

No.	Pos.	Player	Date of birth (age)	Club
		An Kyung-sook		
		Han Eun-kyung		
		Han Mi-ae		
		Im Eun-ju	13 March 1966 (aged 24)	
		Jeon Young-hee		
		Kang Gwi-nyeo		
		Kim Eun-hee		
		Kim Moon-hee		
		Kim Myung-ja		
		Kim Myung-sook		
	FW	Lee Myung-hwa	29 July 1973 (aged 17)	
		Lim Jeong-ja		
		Park Hyang-yeon		
	GK	Park Hyun-joo		
		Shin Hwa-yeon		
		Shin Mi-sun		
		Won Mi-yeon		
	GK	Yoo Young-ae		
