= Indonesia women's national football team results (1975–1999) =

This article provides details of international football games played by the Indonesia women's national football team from 1975 to 1999.

== Results ==
Key
Win
Draw
Defeat

=== 1977 ===
2 August 1977 Women's Asian Cup	Taiwan	5–0	Indonesia	Taipei, Taiwan
--:-- UTC+8	Ho Su-Ching 29', 37', 50'; Liu Su-Yueh 32'; Chou Tai-Mei 60'	Report

5 August 1977 Women's Asian Cup	Indonesia	1–0	Japan	Taipei, Taiwan
--:-- UTC+8	Lantang 20'	Report

9 August 1977 Women's Asian Cup	Thailand	2–1	Indonesia	Taipei, Taiwan
--:-- UTC+8		Report		Stadium: Taipei Municipal Stadium

11 August 1977 Women's Asian Cup	Singapore	2–0	Indonesia	Taipei, Taiwan
--:-- UTC+8		Report		Stadium: Taipei Municipal Stadium

=== 1981 ===
8 June 1981 Women's Asian Cup	Thailand	3–0	Indonesia	Mong Kok, British Hong Kong
--:-- UTC+8	Busara (?); Chanchana (?); Wanvila (?)	Report		Stadium: Mong Kok Stadium; Attendance: 3,427

11 June 1981 Women's Asian Cup	Mulan Taipei	10–0	Indonesia	Mong Kok, British Hong Kong
--:-- UTC+8	Chou Tai-Ying (?); Ho Su-Ching (?); Huang Bee-Yueh (?); Chao Feng-Ying (?); Dorce 15' (o.g.)	Report		Stadium: Mong Kok Stadium; Attendance: 6,822

13 June 1981 Women's Asian Cup	Japan	1–0	Indonesia	Mong Kok, British Hong Kong
--:-- UTC+8	Handa (?)	Report		Stadium: Mong Kok Stadium; Attendance: 7,300

=== 1982 ===
23 March 1982 ASEAN Women's Championship 1982	Indonesia	3–2	Malaysia	Bangkok, Thailand
--:-- UTC+7		Report

24 March 1982 ASEAN Women's Championship 1982	Indonesia	1–0	Singapore	Bangkok, Thailand
--:-- UTC+7	Maryati (?)	Report

26 March 1982 ASEAN Women's Championship 1982	Thailand	1–0	Indonesia	Chaiyaphum, Thailand
--:-- UTC+7		Report

28 March 1982 ASEAN Women's Championship 1982	Thailand	4–1	Indonesia	Bangkok, Thailand
--:-- UTC+7		Report

=== 1985 ===
11 February 1985 ASEAN Women's Championship 1985	Indonesia	3–0	Malaysia	Kuala Lumpur, Malaysia
--:-- UTC+8		Report		Stadium: Jalan Raja Muda Stadium

12 February 1985 ASEAN Women's Championship 1985	Indonesia	3–1	Singapore	Kuala Lumpur, Malaysia
--:-- UTC+8		Report		Stadium: Jalan Raja Muda Stadium

13 February 1985 ASEAN Women's Championship 1985	Thailand	2–1	Indonesia	Kuala Lumpur, Malaysia
--:-- UTC+8		Report		Stadium: Jalan Raja Muda Stadium

14 February 1985 ASEAN Women's Championship 1985	Indonesia	3–0	Philippines	Kuala Lumpur, Malaysia
--:-- UTC+8	Tiktik 4'; Atmini 28'; Maryati 79'	Report		Stadium: Jalan Raja Muda Stadium

16 February 1985 ASEAN Women's Championship 1985	Thailand	1–0	Indonesia	Kuala Lumpur, Malaysia
--:-- UTC+8	Sunee 24'	Report		Stadium: Mindef Stadium

=== 1986 ===
15 December 1986 Women's Asian Cup	Thailand	4–0	Indonesia	Tsuen Wan, British Hong Kong
--:-- UTC+8	Kridsanachandee 40'; Rachasee 43'; Chipeankha 43'; Chaisawat 54'	Report		Stadium: Tsuen Wan Stadium

17 December 1986 Women's Asian Cup	Indonesia	1–0	Hong Kong	Tsuen Wan, British Hong Kong
--:-- UTC+8	Parbo 57'	Report		Stadium: Tsuen Wan Stadium

19 December 1986 Women's Asian Cup	Indonesia	6–0	Nepal	Mong Kok, British Hong Kong
--:-- UTC+8	Atmini 1'; Pella 23'; Kaligis 35', 58'; Rukijah 37', 46'	Report		Stadium: Mong Kok Stadium

21 December 1986 Women's Asian Cup	China	9–0	Indonesia	Mong Kok, British Hong Kong
--:-- UTC+8	Sun Qingmei 2'; Zhang Weiwei (?); Li Xiufu (?); Wang Lili (?); Wu Weiying (?); Susiana 61' (o.g.); Niu Lijie 69'	Report		Stadium: Mong Kok Stadium

23 December 1986 Women's Asian Cup	Thailand	3–1	Indonesia	Mong Kok, British Hong Kong
--:-- UTC+8	Bouthong 2', 16'; Chipeankha 40'	Report	Rukijah 45'	Stadium: Mong Kok Stadium

=== 1989 ===
19 December 1989 Women's Asian Cup	Japan	11–0	Indonesia	Mong Kok, British Hong Kong
--:-- UTC+8	Nagamine 1', 16', 54', 59'; Tezuka 5', 79'; Etsuko Handa 11'; Takakura 18', 51', 71'; Kioka 33'	Report		Stadium: Mong Kok Stadium

22 December 1989 Women's Asian Cup	Indonesia	8–0	Nepal	Mong Kok, British Hong Kong
--:-- UTC+8		Report		Stadium: Mong Kok Stadium

24 December 1989 Women's Asian Cup	Hong Kong	0–0	Indonesia	Mong Kok, British Hong Kong
--:-- UTC+8		Report		Stadium: Mong Kok Stadium

=== 1997 ===
Southeast Asian Games	Myanmar	1–1	Indonesia	Jakarta, Indonesia
--:-- UTC+7		Report

Southeast Asian Games	Indonesia	1–1	Malaysia	Jakarta, Indonesia
--:-- UTC+7		Report

Southeast Asian Games	Thailand	2–0	Indonesia	Jakarta, Indonesia
--:-- UTC+7		Report

Southeast Asian Games	Vietnam	2–0	Indonesia	Jakarta, Indonesia
--:-- UTC+7		Report
