= 1993 AFC Women's Championship =

Kejohanan Wanita AFC 1993

Tournament details
- Host country: Malaysia
- Dates: 3–12 December
- Teams: 8 (from 1 confederation)

Final positions
- Champions: China (4th title)
- Runners-up: North Korea
- Third place: Japan
- Fourth place: Chinese Taipei

Tournament statistics
- Matches played: 16
- Goals scored: 91 (5.69 per match)

The 1993 AFC Women's Championship was an international women's football tournament held in Kuching, Malaysia from 3 to 12 December 1993. It was the 9th staging of the AFC Women's Championship. The tournament was won for the fourth consecutive time by China in the final against North Korea.

== Group stage ==
=== Group A ===
Team	Pld	W	D	L	GF	GA	GD	Pts
North Korea	3	2	1	0	16	1	+15	5
China	3	2	1	0	14	1	+13	5
South Korea	3	1	0	2	4	9	−5	2
Malaysia	3	0	0	3	0	23	−23	0

Source: RSSSF
3 December 1993

South Korea	4–0	Malaysia
Lee Myung-hwa; Yoo Young-sil; Im Jung-ja

Kuching
3 December 1993

China	1–1	North Korea
Zhou Yang		Park Joo-hy

Kuching

5 December 1993

China	6–0	South Korea

Kuching
5 December 1993

North Korea	12–0	Malaysia

Kuching

7 December 1993

China	7–0	Malaysia
Shi Guihong 25'; Wang Liping 30', 36', 62'; Liu Ailing; Sun Qingmei 51'; Niu Lijie 75'

Kuching
8 December 1993

North Korea	3–0	South Korea
Cho Jong-ran 24'; Ri Gyong-ae 40', 61'	Report

Kuching

=== Group B ===
Team	Pld	W	D	L	GF	GA	GD	Pts
Japan	3	3	0	0	25	1	+24	6
Chinese Taipei	3	2	0	1	15	6	+9	4
Hong Kong	3	1	0	2	5	6	−1	2
Philippines	3	0	0	3	0	32	−32	0

Source: RSSSF
4 December 1993

Hong Kong	5–0	Philippines

Kuching
4 December 1993

Japan	6–1	Chinese Taipei
Haneta; Takakura; Handa; Nagamine; Mizuma

Kuching

6 December 1993

Japan	15–0	Philippines
Kioka; Takakura; Sawa; Nagamine; Mizuma; Handa

Kuching
6 December 1993

Chinese Taipei	2–0	Hong Kong

Kuching

8 December 1993

Japan	4–0	Hong Kong
Toumei; Takakura; Kadohara

Kuching
8 December 1993

Chinese Taipei	12–0	Philippines

Kuching

== Knockout stage ==
Semi-finals
10 December
North Korea	2
Chinese Taipei	0
10 December
China	3
Japan	1

Final
12 December
North Korea	0
China	3
Third place
12 December
Chinese Taipei	0
Japan	3

=== Semi-final ===
10 December 1993

North Korea	2–0	Chinese Taipei
Kim Hye-ran 68'; Ri Gyong-ae 74'

Kuching
10 December 1993

China	3–1	Japan
Liu Ailing 30'; Zhao Lihong 36'; Zhou Hua 50'		Takakura 27'

Kuching

=== Third place match ===
12 December 1993

Chinese Taipei	0–3	Japan
		Handa 4'; Mizuma 16'; Kioka 51'

Kuching

=== Final ===
12 December 1993

North Korea	0–3	China
		Liu Ailing 4', 27', 40'

Kuching
Referee: Nik Ahmad Yaacob (Malaysia)

== Winner ==
AFC Women's Championship
1993 winners

China
Fourth title
