= Soccer at the 1998 Goodwill Games =

Goodwill Games event

Football at the 1998 Goodwill Games
Tournament details
- Host country: United States
- City: Uniondale, New York
- Dates: July 25–27
- Teams: 4 (from 3 confederations)
- Venue: 1 (in 1 host city)

Final positions
- Champions: United States (1st title)
- Runners-up: China
- Third place: Norway
- Fourth place: Denmark

Tournament statistics
- Matches played: 4
- Goals scored: 11 (2.75 per match)
- Top scorer: (United States) Mia Hamm (5 goals)

The women's soccer tournament at the 1998 Goodwill Games was held from July 25 to 27, 1998. It was the first time women's football was played at the Goodwill Games, and the second time the sport was played overall. No men's tournament was held in 1998. It was also the last football tournament at the Goodwill Games, as the sport was dropped in 2001. All matches were played at the Mitchel Athletic Complex in Uniondale, New York, United States.

The United States won the tournament, winning 2–0 against China PR in the gold medal match.

== Schedule ==
Legend
½	Semi-finals	B	Bronze medal match	F	Gold medal match

Sat 25	Sun 26	Mon 27	
½		B	F

== Teams ==
Team	Confederation
China	AFC
Denmark	UEFA
Norway	UEFA
United States (host)	CONCACAF

== Venue ==
Soccer at the 1998 Goodwill Games is located in New York	Uniondale
Soccer at the 1998 Goodwill Games is located in New York	Mitchel Athletic Complex
Soccer at the 1998 Goodwill Games is located in New York	Capacity: 10,102

== Squads ==
The four national teams involved in the tournament were required to register a squad of players, including two goalkeepers.

== Matches ==
All times are local, EDT (UTC−4)

=== Bracket ===
Semi-finals
July 25 – Uniondale
United States	5
Denmark	0
July 25 – Uniondale
China (p)	1 (4)
Norway	1 (2)

Gold medal match
July 27 – Uniondale
United States	2
China	0
Bronze medal match
July 27 – Uniondale
Denmark	1 (2)
Norway (p)	1 (4)

=== Semi-finals ===
July 25, 1998
12:00

China	1–1	Norway
Fan Yunjie 78'	Report (SI); Report (NFF)	Pettersen 75'
Penalties
Xie Huilin (penalty scored); Qiu Haiyan (penalty scored); Man Yanling (penalty scored); Sun Wen (penalty scored)	4–2	(penalty scored) Riise; (penalty missed) Kringen; (penalty scored) Viker; (penalty missed) Thun

Mitchel Athletic Complex, Uniondale
Referee: Richard Grady (United States)

July 25, 1998
19:30

United States	5–0	Denmark
Milbrett 18'; Akers 29'; Hamm 45', 70', 75'	Report (SI); Report (Soccer America); Report (DBU)

Mitchel Athletic Complex, Uniondale
Attendance: 6,970
Referee: Johnny Jerome (Canada)

=== Bronze medal match ===
July 27, 1998
18:00

Denmark	1–1	Norway
Eggers Nielsen 81'	Report (SI); Report (DBU); Report (NFF)	Lehn 19'
Penalties
Eggers Nielsen (penalty missed); Krogh (penalty scored); Rasmussen (penalty scored); Hansen (penalty missed)	2–4	(penalty scored) Riise; (penalty scored) Medalen; (penalty scored) Pettersen; (penalty scored) Viker

Mitchel Athletic Complex, Uniondale
Attendance: 11,300
Referee: Kevin Terry (United States)

=== Gold medal match ===
July 27, 1998
20:00

United States	2–0	China
Hamm 66', 87'	Report (SI); Report (Soccer America)

Mitchel Athletic Complex, Uniondale
Attendance: 11,307
Referee: Willie Laidlaw and Johnny Jerome (Canada) (Note: Two Canadian referees officiated the match: Willie Laidlaw in the first half, and Johnny Jerome in the second half.)

== Statistics ==
=== Goalscorers ===
There were 11 goals scored in 4 matches, for an average of 2.75 goals per match.

5 goals

- (United States) Mia Hamm

1 goal

- (China) Fan Yunjie
- (Denmark) Anne Dot Eggers Nielsen
- (Norway) Unni Lehn
- (Norway) Marianne Pettersen
- (United States) Michelle Akers
- (United States) Tiffeny Milbrett

Source: RSSSF

=== Tournament ranking ===
Per statistical convention in football, matches decided in extra time are counted as wins and losses, while matches decided by penalty shoot-outs are counted as draws.

Pos	Team	Pld	W	D	L	GF	GA	GD	Pts	Final result
1	United States (H)	2	2	0	0	7	0	+7	6	Gold medal
2	China	2	0	1	1	1	3	−2	1	Silver medal
3	Norway	2	0	2	0	2	2	0	2	Bronze medal
4	Denmark	2	0	1	1	1	6	−5	1	Fourth place

Source: Goodwill Games
(H) Hosts

== Medal summary ==
=== Medal table ===
* Host nation (United States)

Rank	Nation	Gold	Silver	Bronze	Total
1	United States*	1	0	0	1
2	China	0	1	0	1
3	Norway	0	0	1	1
Totals (3 entries)		1	1	1	3

=== Medalists ===
Event	Gold	Silver	Bronze
Football	United States; Michelle Akers; Brandi Chastain; Tracy Ducar; Lorrie Fair; Joy Fawcett; Julie Foudy; Mia Hamm; Debbie Keller; Kristine Lilly; Shannon MacMillan; Tiffeny Milbrett; Carla Overbeck; Cindy Parlow; Christie Pearce; Tiffany Roberts; Briana Scurry; Kate Sobrero; Tisha Venturini	China; Bai Jie; Fan Yunjie; Gao Hong; He Xingxue; Jin Yan; Liu Ailing; Liu Ying; Man Yanling; Mo Chenyue; Qiu Haiyan; Sun Wen; Wang Jingxia; Wang Liping; Xie Caixia; Xie Huilin; Zhang Ouying; Zhao Lihong; Zhao Yan; Zhu Jing	Norway; Elisabeth Fagereng; Ragnhild Gulbrandsen; Solveig Gulbrandsen; Margunn Haugenes; Ingeborg Hovland; Silje Jørgensen; Monica Knudsen; Gøril Kringen; Unni Lehn; Linda Medalen; Bente Nordby; Marianne Pettersen; Hege Riise; Brit Sandaune; Kjersti Thun; Anne Tønnessen; Henriette Viker
