= Football at the 1994 Asian Games – Women's team squads =

Below are the squads for the women's football tournament at the 1994 Asian Games, played in Hiroshima, Japan.

== China ==
Coach: Ma Yuanan

| No. | Pos. | Player | Date of birth (age) | Club |
|---|---|---|---|---|
| | | Cao Yao | | |
| | MF | Chen Yufeng | 17 January 1970 (aged 24) | |
| | DF | Fan Yunjie | 29 April 1972 (aged 22) | |
| | | Gu Pingjuan | | |
| | MF | Liu Ailing | 2 June 1967 (aged 27) | |
| | DF | Niu Lijie | 12 April 1969 (aged 25) | |
| | FW | Shi Guihong | 13 February 1968 (aged 26) | |
| | DF | Shui Qingxia | 18 December 1966 (aged 27) | |
| | FW | Sun Qingmei | 19 June 1966 (aged 28) | |
| | FW | Sun Wen | 6 April 1973 (aged 21) | |
| | MF | Wang Liping | 12 November 1973 (aged 20) | |
| | FW | Wei Haiying | 5 January 1971 (aged 23) | |
| | DF | Wen Lirong | 2 October 1969 (aged 25) | |
| | DF | Yu Hongqi | 2 February 1973 (aged 21) | |
| | MF | Zhao Lihong | 4 December 1972 (aged 21) | |
| | GK | Zhong Honglian | 27 October 1967 (aged 26) | |
| | MF | Zhou Hua | 3 October 1969 (aged 24) | |
| | MF | Zhou Yang | 2 January 1971 (aged 23) | |

== Chinese Taipei ==
Coach: Hsieh Chih-chun

| No. | Pos. | Player | Date of birth (age) | Club |
|---|---|---|---|---|
| | | Chang Hsiu-ling | | |
| | | Chen Chu-chi | | |
| | MF | Chen Shu-chin | 19 September 1974 (aged 20) | |
| | MF | Chou Tai-ying | 16 August 1963 (aged 31) | |
| | DF | Hsu Chia-cheng | 7 June 1969 (aged 25) | (Japan Football Association) Suzuyo Shimizu Lovely Ladies |
| | | Hsu Ching-hsin | | |
| | FW | Huang Yu-chuan | 17 February 1971 (aged 23) | |
| | | Hung Mei-hsiu | | |
| | FW | Ko Chiao-lin | 14 September 1973 (aged 21) | |
| | DF | Lan Lan-fen | 12 November 1973 (aged 20) | |
| | | Lee Mei-chin | | |
| | GK | Lin Hui-fang | 6 October 1973 (aged 20) | |
| | FW | Lin Mei-chun | 11 January 1974 (aged 20) | |
| | MF | Lin Mei-jih | 27 February 1972 (aged 22) | |
| | MF | Shieh Su-jean | 10 February 1969 (aged 25) | (Japan Football Association) Suzuyo Shimizu Lovely Ladies |
| | | Wu Huey-shwu | | |
| | DF | Wu Min-hsun | 26 September 1974 (aged 20) | |
| | | Yeh Huei-chen | | |

== Japan ==
Coach: Tamotsu Suzuki

| No. | Pos. | Player | Date of birth (age) | Club |
|---|---|---|---|---|
| | MF | Etsuko Handa | 10 May 1965 (aged 29) | (Japan Football Association) Suzuyo Shimizu Lovely Ladies |
| | DF | Maki Haneta | 30 September 1972 (aged 22) | (Japan Football Association) Matsushita Electric Bambina |
| | MF | Kaoru Kadohara | 25 May 1970 (aged 24) | (Japan Football Association) Matsushita Electric Bambina |
| | MF | Futaba Kioka | 22 November 1965 (aged 28) | (Japan Football Association) Suzuyo Shimizu Lovely Ladies |
| | DF | Kyoko Kuroda | 8 May 1969 (aged 25) | (Japan Football Association) Prima Ham Kunoichi |
| | FW | Tsuru Morimoto | 9 November 1970 (aged 23) | (Japan Football Association) Nikko Securities Dream Ladies |
| | DF | Terumi Nagae | | (Japan Football Association) Nikko Securities Dream Ladies |
| | FW | Kaori Nagamine | 3 June 1968 (aged 26) | (Japan Football Association) Suzuyo Shimizu Lovely Ladies |
| | MF | Akemi Noda | 13 October 1969 (aged 24) | (Japan Football Association) Yomiuri-Seiyu Beleza |
| | GK | Shiho Onodera | 18 November 1973 (aged 20) | (Japan Football Association) Yomiuri-Seiyu Beleza |
| | FW | Nami Otake | 30 July 1974 (aged 20) | (Japan Football Association) Yomiuri-Seiyu Beleza |
| | GK | Junko Ozawa | 7 December 1973 (aged 20) | (Japan Football Association) Tokyo Shidax |
| | MF | Homare Sawa | 6 September 1978 (aged 16) | (Japan Football Association) Yomiuri-Seiyu Beleza |
| | MF | Asako Takakura | 19 April 1968 (aged 26) | (Japan Football Association) Yomiuri-Seiyu Beleza |
| | FW | Inesu Emiko Takeoka | 1 May 1971 (aged 23) | (Japan Football Association) Nikko Securities Dream Ladies |
| | DF | Yumi Tomei | 1 June 1972 (aged 22) | (Japan Football Association) Prima Ham Kunoichi |
| | FW | Tamaki Uchiyama | 13 December 1972 (aged 21) | (Japan Football Association) Prima Ham Kunoichi |
| | DF | Rie Yamaki | 2 October 1975 (aged 19) | (Japan Football Association) Nikko Securities Dream Ladies |

== South Korea ==
Coach: Lee Yi-woo

| No. | Pos. | Player | Date of birth (age) | Club |
|---|---|---|---|---|
| | FW | Cha Sung-mi | 23 November 1975 (aged 18) | |
| | | Han Ok-sun | | |
| | MF | Hwang In-sun | 2 February 1976 (aged 18) | |
| | | Hwang Hye-young | | |
| | | Jang Jeong-hee | | |
| | | Jeong Mi-yeong | | |
| | | Jeong Su-jin | | |
| | GK | Kim Ae-ja | | |
| | | Kim Soo-kyung | | |
| | GK | Kwak Soon-mi | | |
| | DF | Lee Mi-yeon | | |
| | FW | Lee Myung-hwa | 29 July 1973 (aged 21) | |
| | | Lim Jeong-ja | | |
| | | Noh Kang-suk | | |
| | | Seo Kyung-suk | | |
| | MF | Son Seong-mi | | |
| | | Yoo Hyun-jung | | |
| | DF | Yoo Young-sil | 1 May 1975 (aged 19) | |
