= Football at the 1998 Asian Games – Women's team squads =

Below are the squads for the women's football tournament at the 1998 Asian Games, played in Bangkok, Thailand.

== Group A ==
=== Japan ===
Coach: Satoshi Miyauchi

No.	Pos.	Player	Date of birth (age)	Club
	FW	Mito Isaka	25 January 1976 (aged 22)	(Japan Football Association) Prima Ham Kunoichi
	DF	Hiromi Isozaki	22 December 1975 (aged 22)	(Japan Football Association) Tasaki Perule
	FW	Kazumi Kishi	25 November 1975 (aged 23)	(Japan Football Association) Takarazuka Bunnys
	MF	Tomomi Mitsui	31 December 1978 (aged 19)	(Japan Football Association) Prima Ham Kunoichi
	DF	Mai Nakachi	16 December 1980 (aged 17)	(Japan Football Association) Yomiuri Beleza
	DF	Kae Nishina	7 December 1972 (aged 25)	(Japan Football Association) Prima Ham Kunoichi
	DF	Yumi Obe	15 February 1975 (aged 23)	(Japan Football Association) Nikko Securities Dream Ladies
	GK	Shiho Onodera	18 November 1973 (aged 25)	(Japan Football Association) Yomiuri Beleza
	FW	Nami Otake	30 July 1974 (aged 24)	(Japan Football Association) Yomiuri Beleza
	MF	Tomoe Sakai	27 May 1978 (aged 20)	(Japan Football Association) Yomiuri Beleza
	MF	Homare Sawa	6 September 1978 (aged 20)	(Japan Football Association) Yomiuri Beleza
	MF	Miki Sugawara		(Japan Football Association) Prima Ham Kunoichi
	DF	Yumi Tomei	1 June 1972 (aged 26)	(Japan Football Association) Prima Ham Kunoichi
	FW	Tamaki Uchiyama	13 December 1972 (aged 25)	(Japan Football Association) Prima Ham Kunoichi
	DF	Yasuyo Yamagishi	28 November 1979 (aged 19)	(Japan Football Association) Prima Ham Kunoichi
	GK	Nozomi Yamago	16 January 1975 (aged 23)	(Japan Football Association) Prima Ham Kunoichi
	DF	Rie Yamaki	2 October 1975 (aged 23)	(Japan Football Association) Nikko Securities Dream Ladies
	MF	Miyuki Yanagita	11 April 1981 (aged 17)	(Japan Football Association) Yomiuri Beleza

=== North Korea ===
No.	Pos.	Player	Date of birth (age)	Club
	FW	Jin Pyol-hui	19 August 1980 (aged 18)	
	FW	Jo Jong-ran	18 September 1971 (aged 27)	
	FW	Jo Song-ok	18 March 1974 (aged 24)	
	DF	Kim Hye-ran	19 May 1970 (aged 28)	
	MF	Kim Kum-sil	24 December 1970 (aged 27)	
	FW	Kim Song-ryo	5 June 1976 (aged 22)	
	DF	Kim Sun-hui	4 April 1972 (aged 26)	
	DF	Kim Sun-hye	1 January 1977 (aged 21)	
	GK	Kye Yong-sun	27 March 1972 (aged 26)	
	MF	Pak Jong-ae	3 April 1974 (aged 24)	
	DF	Ri Ae-gyong	12 September 1971 (aged 27)	
	MF	Ri Hyang-ok	18 December 1977 (aged 20)	
	GK	Ri Jong-hui	20 August 1975 (aged 23)	
	FW	Ri Kum-suk	16 August 1978 (aged 20)	
	MF	Ri Kyong-ae	4 December 1972 (aged 26)	
	MF	Sol Yong-suk	4 February 1975 (aged 23)	
	DF	Yang Kyong-hui	21 January 1978 (aged 20)	
	DF	Yun In-sil	10 January 1976 (aged 22)	

=== Thailand ===
No.	Pos.	Player	Date of birth (age)	Club
	GK	Nuengrutai Srathongvian	1 January 1972 (aged 26)	
	GK	Dechophon Sungtong		

=== Vietnam ===
Coach: (China) Jia Guangta

No.	Pos.	Player	Date of birth (age)	Club
	FW	Bùi Thị Hiền Lương		
	MF	Đỗ Thị Mỹ Oanh		
	MF	Đoàn Thị Kim Chi	29 April 1979 (aged 19)	
	GK	Nguyễn Thị Kim Hồng		

== Group B ==
=== China ===
Coach: Ma Yuanan

No.	Pos.	Player	Date of birth (age)	Club
	FW	Bai Jie	28 March 1972 (aged 26)	
	DF	Fan Yunjie	29 April 1972 (aged 26)	
	GK	Gao Hong	27 November 1967 (aged 31)	
	FW	Jin Yan	27 July 1972 (aged 26)	
	MF	Liu Ailing	2 June 1967 (aged 31)	
	MF	Liu Ying	11 June 1974 (aged 24)	
	DF	Man Yanling	9 November 1972 (aged 26)	
	MF	Qiu Haiyan	17 June 1974 (aged 24)	
	DF	Shui Qingxia	18 December 1966 (aged 31)	
	MF	Sun Qimin		
	FW	Sun Wen	6 April 1973 (aged 25)	
	DF	Wang Jingxia	11 November 1976 (aged 22)	
	MF	Wang Liping	12 November 1973 (aged 25)	
	DF	Wen Lirong	2 October 1969 (aged 29)	
	DF	Xie Huilin	17 January 1975 (aged 23)	
	FW	Zhang Ouying	2 November 1975 (aged 23)	
	MF	Zhao Lihong	4 December 1972 (aged 26)	
	GK	Zhao Yan	7 May 1972 (aged 26)	

=== Chinese Taipei ===
Coach: Kao Yong

No.	Pos.	Player	Date of birth (age)	Club
		Chang Ming-chu		
		Chang Tzu-yun		
	FW	Chen Ya-ling	23 September 1979 (aged 19)	
		Chu Hsin-hsin		
	FW	He Meng-hua		
	MF	Huang Chun-lan	15 March 1979 (aged 19)	
		Huang Shou-mei		
		Hung Li-min		
		Hung Mei-li		
	DF	Lan Lan-fen	22 November 1973 (aged 25)	
	FW	Lee Ming-shu	22 March 1979 (aged 19)	
		Li Chia-lun		
		Tseng Yueh-jo		
		Wu Huey-shwu		
	GK	Yang Tsu-chen		
		Yang Ya-ching		
		Yeh Yu-shuang		
		Yen Chih-ping		

=== India ===
Coach: S. Arumainayagam

No.	Pos.	Player	Date of birth (age)	Club
	MF	Bentla D'Coth	29 May 1969 (aged 29)	
	GK	Binashori Devi		
	DF	Chaitali Kar		
	DF	Chaoba Devi	24 April 1973 (aged 25)	
	DF	Khambi Devi		
	DF	Kumari Devi		
	FW	Lokeshwari Devi		
	MF	Oinam Bembem Devi	1 March 1980 (aged 18)	
	GK	Robita Devi		
	FW	S. Rani Devi		
	FW	Tababi Devi	1 September 1977 (aged 21)	
	DF	Ezhilarasi		
	FW	Sujata Kar	13 May 1980 (aged 18)	
	FW	Gurmeet Kaur		
	MF	Gracey Pereira		
	DF	Maria Rebello		
	MF	Sradhanjali Samantaray	20 June 1978 (aged 20)	
	MF	Alpana Sil		

=== South Korea ===
Coach: Lee Yi-woo

No.	Pos.	Player	Date of birth (age)	Club
1	GK	Jung Ho-jung	11 May 1976 (aged 22)	
2	DF	Lee Mi-yeon		
3	DF	Park Hae-jung	10 March 1977 (aged 21)	
4	DF	Kim Yu-jin	17 July 1979 (aged 19)	
5		Hwang Hye-young		
6	FW	Cha Sung-mi	23 November 1975 (aged 23)	
7	MF	Son Seong-mi		
8	MF	Kim Kyul-sil	13 April 1982 (aged 16)	
9	FW	Lee Myung-hwa	29 July 1973 (aged 25)	
10		Lee Mi-ae		
11		Kwon Min-ju		
12	DF	Yoo Young-sil	1 May 1975 (aged 23)	
13	DF	Bae Jung-soo	11 October 1978 (aged 20)	
14	DF	Jin Suk-hee	9 July 1978 (aged 20)	
15		Park Ji-hye		
16		Kim Mi-jung		
17		Kang Sun-mi		
18		Kim Mi-jeong		
