= Kyoko Kuroda =

Japanese footballer

Kyoko Kuroda 黒田 今日子
Personal information
- Full name: Kyoko Kuroda
- Date of birth: May 8, 1969 (age 57)
- Place of birth: Japan
- Position: Defender

Senior career*
Years	Team	Apps	(Gls)
- Prima Ham FC Kunoichi

International career
1989–1994	Japan	21	(7)
Medal record
Representing Japan
AFC Women's Asian Cup
Silver medal – second place	1991 Japan
Bronze medal – third place	1989 Hong Kong
Asian Games
Silver medal – second place	1990 Beijing	Team
Silver medal – second place	1994 Hiroshima	Team
- * Club domestic league appearances and goals

Kyoko Kuroda (黒田 今日子, Kuroda Kyōko; born May 8, 1969) is a former Japanese football player. She played for Japan national team.

== Club career ==
Kuroda was born on May 8, 1969. She played for Prima Ham FC Kunoichi. She was selected Best Eleven in 1991 season.

== National team career ==
On January 12, 1989, when Kuroda was 19 years old, she debuted for Japan national team against Finland. She was a member of Japan for 1991 World Cup. She played at 1989, 1991 AFC Championship, 1990 and 1994 Asian Games. She played 21 games and scored 7 goals for Japan until 1994.

== National team statistics ==
Japan national team
Year	Apps	Goals
1989	4	6
1990	2	1
1991	11	0
1992	0	0
1993	0	0
1994	4	0
Total	21	7
