= Liu Ailing =

Chinese footballer (born 1967)

Liu Ailing 刘爱玲
Personal information
- Full name: Liu Ailing
- Date of birth: 2 May 1967 (age 59)
- Place of birth: Baotou, China
- Height: 1.68 m (5 ft 6 in)
- Position: Midfielder

Senior career*
| Years | Team | Apps | (Gls) |
| 1985–1993 | Beijing | | |
| 1994–1997 | Tasaki Perule FC | | |
| 1998–2000 | Beijing | | |
| 2001–2002 | Philadelphia Charge | 39 | (12) |

International career^{‡}
| 1987–2002 | China | 111 | (29) |
Medal record
Women's football
Representing China
Olympic Games
| Silver medal – second place | 1996 Atlanta | Team |
Asian Games
| Gold medal – first place | 1990 Beijing | Team |
| Gold medal – first place | 1994 Hiroshima | Team |
| Gold medal – first place | 1998 Bangkok | Team |
- * Club domestic league appearances and goals as of 22:45, 23 November 2016 (UTC) ‡ National team caps and goals as of 22:45, 23 November 2016 (UTC)

Liu Ailing (simplified Chinese: 刘爱玲; traditional Chinese: 劉愛玲; pinyin: Liú Àilíng; born 2 May 1967) is a Chinese former footballer who played for the China national team at the 1991, 1995 and 1999 editions of the FIFA Women's World Cup. She won a silver medal at the 1996 Atlanta Olympics and participated at the 2000 Sydney Olympics. A playmaking midfielder, she played professional club football in Japan and the United States.

== Club career ==
Born in Baotou, Inner Mongolia, Liu excelled in basketball and athletics but did not play football until she was 17 years old. Her parents were initially reluctant to let her play what they saw as a masculine sport.

In 1994, Liu joined Japanese second-tier club Tasaki Perule FC. She won promotion in her first season and remained with the club until 1997.

At the 2000 WUSA Draft, Liu was selected by Philadelphia Charge in the first round, second overall behind compatriot Sun Wen. In the United States, Liu experienced a culture shock; she bought only raw fruit and vegetables from the supermarket as in China she had been in regimented training camps for so long that she had never learned to cook. In the 2001 WUSA season, as a 34-year-old veteran, Liu was a success and led the team on goals (10) and points (22). She was the first woman to win WUSA's Player of the Week in two consecutive weeks, and the first woman to win it three times. Coach Mark Krikorian said of Liu: "She has been one of the greatest center midfielders in the world". In 2002, Liu was less effective, contributing two goals and two assists for six points in her 20 regular season appearances (11 starts). She retired at the end of the season.

== International career ==
At the 1991 FIFA Women's World Cup, Liu played the full 80 minutes in all four of China's games. The hosts reached the quarter-finals before losing 1–0 to Sweden. In the first ever FIFA Women's World Cup match, Liu scored twice in China's 4–0 win over eventual finalists Norway on 16 November 1991.

At the 1996 Atlanta Olympics, she won the silver medal with the Chinese team when she played all five matches and scored one goal.

At the 1997 AFC Women's Championship, Liu scored four goals in China's 10–0 semi-final win over Taiwan and two goals in the 2–0 final win over obdurate North Korea. She was named tournament MVP. Liu was named in the 16-player All-Star team at the 1999 FIFA Women's World Cup. She scored the winning goal in the 2–1 first round win over Sweden and two more in the 5–0 semi-final rout of defending champions Norway, securing China's place in the final, where they lost a controversial penalty shootout to the United States.

In 2000, she was a member of the Chinese team which finished fifth in the Olympic women's tournament. She played all three matches.

In 2003, Liu took a role as deputy secretary general of the Beijing Football Association. Following the playing retirement of Liu and influential contemporaries like Sun Wen and Zhao Lihong, the Chinese national team went into sharp decline, culminating in an 8–0 defeat by Germany at the 2004 Athens Olympics. In June 2007, Liu was running the only girls' football school in Beijing, when it closed through lack of interest.

== International goals ==
| No. | Date | Venue | Opponent | Score | Result | Competition |
|---|---|---|---|---|---|---|
| 1. | 21 December 1989 | Kowloon, Hong Kong | North Korea | 4–1 | 4–1 | 1989 AFC Women's Championship |
| 2. | 26 December 1989 | Kowloon, Hong Kong | Hong Kong | ?–0 | 7–0 | 1989 AFC Women's Championship |
| 3. | 16 November 1991 | Guangzhou, China | Norway | 2–0 | 4–0 | 1991 FIFA Women's World Cup |
| 4. | 16 November 1991 | Guangzhou, China | Norway | 3–0 | 4–0 | 1991 FIFA Women's World Cup |
| 5. | 21 November 1991 | Foshan, China | New Zealand | 2–0 | 4–1 | 1991 FIFA Women's World Cup |
| 6. | 21 November 1991 | Foshan, China | New Zealand | 4–0 | 4–1 | 1991 FIFA Women's World Cup |
| 7. | 5 December 1993 | Kuching, Malaysia | South Korea | ?–0 | 6–0 | 1993 AFC Women's Championship |
| 8. | 7 December 1993 | Kuching, Malaysia | Malaysia | ?–0 | 7–0 | 1993 AFC Women's Championship |
| 9. | 10 December 1993 | Kuching, Malaysia | Japan | 1–1 | 1–1 | 1993 AFC Women's Championship |
| 10. | 12 December 1993 | Kuching, Malaysia | North Korea | 1–0 | 3–0 | 1993 AFC Women's Championship |
| 11. | 12 December 1993 | Kuching, Malaysia | North Korea | 2–0 | 3–0 | 1993 AFC Women's Championship |
| 12. | 12 December 1993 | Kuching, Malaysia | North Korea | 3–0 | 3–0 | 1993 AFC Women's Championship |
| 13. | 8 June 1995 | Västerås, Sweden | Australia | 4–2 | 4–2 | 1995 FIFA Women's World Cup |
| 14. | 26 September 1995 | Kota Kinabalu, Malaysia | Hong Kong | 11–0 | 12–0 | 1995 AFC Women's Championship |
| 15. | 23 July 1996 | Miami, United States | Denmark | 2–0 | 5–1 | 1996 Summer Olympics |
| 16. | 5 December 1997 | Guangdong, China | North Korea | 1–0 | 3–1 | 1997 AFC Women's Championship |
| 17. | 5 December 1997 | Guangdong, China | North Korea | 3–1 | 3–1 | 1997 AFC Women's Championship |
| 18. | 12 December 1997 | Guangdong, China | Chinese Taipei | 3–0 | 10–0 | 1997 AFC Women's Championship |
| 19. | 12 December 1997 | Guangdong, China | Chinese Taipei | 5–0 | 10–0 | 1997 AFC Women's Championship |
| 20. | 12 December 1997 | Guangdong, China | Chinese Taipei | 6–0 | 10–0 | 1997 AFC Women's Championship |
| 21. | 12 December 1997 | Guangdong, China | Chinese Taipei | 10–0 | 10–0 | 1997 AFC Women's Championship |
| 22. | 14 December 1997 | Guangdong, China | North Korea | 1–0 | 2–0 | 1997 AFC Women's Championship |
| 23. | 14 December 1997 | Guangdong, China | North Korea | 2–0 | 2–0 | 1997 AFC Women's Championship |
| 24. | 19 June 1999 | San Jose, United States | Sweden | 2–1 | 2–1 | 1999 FIFA Women's World Cup |
| 25. | 4 July 1999 | Foxborough, United States | Norway | 2–0 | 5–0 | 1999 FIFA Women's World Cup |
| 26. | 4 July 1999 | Foxborough, United States | Norway | 3–0 | 5–0 | 1999 FIFA Women's World Cup |
| 27. | 9 November 1999 | Bacolod, Philippines | Guam | 3–0 | 15–0 | 1999 AFC Women's Championship |
| 28. | 9 November 1999 | Bacolod, Philippines | Guam | 6–0 | 15–0 | 1999 AFC Women's Championship |
| 29. | 19 November 1999 | Bacolod, Philippines | North Korea | 2–0 | 3–0 | 1999 AFC Women's Championship |

== Honors ==
=== International ===
China

- World Cup Silver Medal: 1999
- Olympic Silver Medal: 1996
- AFC Women's Championship: 1989, 1991, 1993, 1995, 1997, 1999
- Football at the Asian Games: 1990, 1994, 1998

=== Individual ===
- Asian Player of the Month: December 1997

== See also ==
- List of women's footballers with 100 or more international caps
