= China women's national football team results (1986–1989) =

This article lists the results for the China women's national football team between 1986 and 1989.

Key
Win
Draw
Defeat

== 1986 ==
20 July 1986 Friendly	United States	2–1	China	Jesolo

24 July 1986 Friendly	China	1–1	Brazil	Jesolo

25 July 1986 Friendly	Italy	3–0	China	Jesolo

26 July 1986 Friendly	China	2–1	Japan	Jesolo

14 December 1986 1986 AFC Women's Championship	China	2–0	Japan	Hong Kong

16 December 1986 1986 AFC Women's Championship	China	10–0	Malaysia	Hong Kong

21 December 1986 1986 AFC Women's Championship	China	9–0	Indonesia	Hong Kong

23 December 1986 1986 AFC Women's Championship	China	2–0	Japan	Hong Kong

== 1987 ==
7 July 1987 Friendly	Sweden	6–0	China

9 July 1987 Friendly	Norway	4–0	China

11 July 1987 Friendly	Canada	2–0	China

3 August 1987 Friendly	China	0–2	United States	Tianjin

13 August 1987 Friendly	China	1–1	United States	Shenyang

== 1988 ==
1 June 1988 1988 FIFA Women's Invitation Tournament	China	2–0	Canada	Guangzhou

3 June 1988 1988 FIFA Women's Invitation Tournament	China	1–0	Netherlands	Guangzhou

5 June 1988 1988 FIFA Women's Invitation Tournament	China	8–1	Ivory Coast	Guangzhou

8 June 1988 1988 FIFA Women's Invitation Tournament	China	7–0	Australia	Guangzhou

10 June 1988 1988 FIFA Women's Invitation Tournament	Sweden	2–1	China	Guangzhou

12 June 1988 1988 FIFA Women's Invitation Tournament	Brazil	0–0 (4–3 p)	China	Guangzhou

== 1989 ==
18 January 1989 Friendly	China	5–0	Finland	Xiamen

25 May 1989 Friendly	Yugoslavia	1–6	China	Niš

18 December 1989 1989 AFC Women's Championship	China	1–0	Chinese Taipei	Hong Kong

21 December 1989 1989 AFC Women's Championship	China	4–1	North Korea	Hong Kong

23 December 1989 1989 AFC Women's Championship	China	3–1	Thailand	Hong Kong

26 December 1989 1989 AFC Women's Championship	China	7–0	Hong Kong	Hong Kong

29 December 1989 1989 AFC Women's Championship	China	1–0	Chinese Taipei	Hong Kong
