= Indonesia women's national football team results =

Indonesia women's national football team results may refer to:

- Indonesia women's national football team results (1975–1999)
- Indonesia women's national football team results (2000–2009)
- Indonesia women's national football team results (2010–2019)
  - 2013 Indonesia national football team results
  - 2015 Indonesia national football team results
- Indonesia women's national football team results (2020–present)
  - 2021 Indonesia national football team results
  - 2022 Indonesia national football team results
  - 2023 Indonesia national football team results
  - 2024 Indonesia national football team results
