= Wen Lirong =

Chinese footballer (born 1969)

Personal information
- Full name: Wen Lirong
- Date of birth: 2 October 1969 (age 57)
- Place of birth: Chengdu, China
- Height: 1.68 m (5 ft 6 in)
- Position: Defender

Senior career*
Years	Team	Apps	(Gls)
1983–1989	Sichuan Corps		
1989–1994	Beijing Chengjian		
1994–1999	Iga FC Kunoichi Mie		
2000	Beijing Chengjian		
2001	Carolina Courage	11	(0)
2001	San Diego Spirit	8	(0)

International career
1987–2001	China	163	
Medal record
Women's football
Representing China
Olympic Games
Silver medal – second place	1996 Atlanta	Team
Asian Games
Gold medal – first place	1990 Beijing	Team
Gold medal – first place	1994 Hiroshima	Team
Gold medal – first place	1998 Bangkok	Team
FIFA Women's World Cup
Runner-up	1999 United States
- * Club domestic league appearances and goals

Wen Lirong (simplified Chinese: 温利蓉; traditional Chinese: 溫利蓉; pinyin: Wēn Lìróng; born 2 October 1969) is a Chinese former footballer who played as a defender. She competed in the 1996 and 2000 Summer Olympics.

In 1996 she won the silver medal with the Chinese team. She played four matches, but missed the final after being sent off in the semifinal.

Four years later she was a member of the Chinese team which finished fifth in the women's tournament. She played all three matches.
