= 1986 AFC Women's Championship =

1986年亞足聯女子錦標賽

Tournament details
- Host country: Hong Kong
- Dates: 14–23 December
- Teams: 7 (from 1 confederation)
- Venues: 3 (in 1 host city)

Final positions
- Champions: China (1st title)
- Runners-up: Japan
- Third place: Thailand
- Fourth place: Indonesia

Tournament statistics
- Matches played: 13
- Goals scored: 61 (4.69 per match)
- Top scorer: (China) Niu Lijie (11 goals)
- Best player: (China) Wu Weiying

The 1986 AFC Women's Championship was held in December 1986 in Hong Kong. The tournament was won for the first time by China in the final against Japan.

It is the sixth edition of the tournament, and the first to be held under the auspices of the Asian Football Confederation.

== Group stage ==
=== Group A ===
Team	Pld	W	D	L	GF	GA	GD	Pts
China	2	2	0	0	12	0	+12	4
Japan	2	1	0	1	10	2	+8	2
Malaysia	2	0	0	2	0	20	−20	0

Source: RSSSF
14 December 1986

China	2–0	Japan
Sun Qingmei 15'; Niu Lijie 63'	Report

Hong Kong Stadium, Hong Kong

16 December 1986

China	10–0	Malaysia
Wu Weiying 14', 15'; Sun Qingmei 16'; Niu Lijie 19', 24', 31', 66'; Wang Fei 25'; Li Xiufu 51'; Huo Xiaomei 58'

Mongkok Stadium, Hong Kong

18 December 1986

Japan	10–0	Malaysia
Takakura 15', 16'; Nagamine 16', 39', 43', 45'; Kioka 51', 65'; Tezuka 57'; Matsuda 63'

Tsuen Wan Stadium, Hong Kong

=== Group B ===
Team	Pld	W	D	L	GF	GA	GD	Pts
Thailand	3	3	0	0	11	0	+11	6
Indonesia	3	2	0	1	7	4	+3	4
Hong Kong	3	1	0	2	1	3	−2	2
Nepal	3	0	0	3	0	12	−12	0

Source: RSSSF
14 December 1986

Hong Kong	1–0	Nepal
Shiu Wai Wai 18'

Hong Kong Stadium, Hong Kong

15 December 1986

Thailand	4–0	Indonesia
Kridsanachandee 40'; Rachasee 43'; Chipeankha 43'; Chaisawat 54'

Tsuen Wan Stadium, Hong Kong

17 December 1986

Thailand	5–0	Nepal
Rachasee 15'; Chipeankha 42'; Bouthong 49' ? 57' ? 64'

Tsuen Wan Stadium, Hong Kong
17 December 1986

Indonesia	1–0	Hong Kong
Parbo 57'

Tsuen Wan Stadium, Hong Kong

19 December 1986

Indonesia	6–0	Nepal
Atmini 1'; Pella 23'; Kaligis 35', 58'; Rukijah 37', 46'

Mongkok Stadium, Hong Kong
19 December 1986

Thailand	2–0	Hong Kong
Chipeankha 31', 37'

Mongkok Stadium, Hong Kong

== Knock-out stage ==
Semi-finals
21 December
China	9
Indonesia	0
21 December
Thailand	0
Japan	4

Final
23 December
China	2
Japan	0
Third place
23 December
Thailand	3
Indonesia	1

=== Semi-final ===
21 December 1986

China	9–0	Indonesia
Sun Qingmei 2'; Niu Lijie 4', 13', 21', 69'; Wang Lili 17'; Li Xiufu 20'; Wu Weiying 25'; Susiana 61' (o.g.)

Mong Kok Stadium, Hong Kong
21 December 1986

Thailand	0–4	Japan
		Kioka 37'; Nagamine 38'; Noda 48'; Matsuda 50'

Mong Kok Stadium, Hong Kong

=== Third place match ===
23 December 1986

Thailand	3–1	Indonesia
Bouthong 2', 16'; Chipeankha 40'		Rukijah 45'

Mong Kok Stadium, Hong Kong

=== Final ===
23 December 1986

China	2–0	Japan
Niu Lijie 5', 17'

Mong Kok Stadium, Hong Kong

== Winner ==
AFC Women's Championship
1986 winners

China
First title
