= 1991 L.League =

L. League
- Season: 1991
- Champions: Yomiuri SC Ladies Beleza; 2nd L. League title
- Top goalscorer: Takako Tezuka (29 goals)

Statistics of L. League in the 1991 season. Yomiuri SC Ladies Beleza won the championship.

== JLSL League standings ==
Pos	Team	Pld	W	D	L	GF	GA	GD	Pts	Qualification
1	Yomiuri SC Ladies Beleza	18	16	2	0	94	6	+88	34	Champions
2	Suzuyo Shimizu FC Lovely Ladies	18	14	2	2	81	14	+67	30	
3	Prima Ham FC Kunoichi	18	13	2	3	69	15	+54	28	
4	Nikko Securities Dream Ladies	18	10	2	6	24	26	−2	22	
5	Nissan FC Ladies	18	10	0	8	33	19	+14	20	
6	Tasaki Kobe Ladies	18	7	3	8	27	30	−3	17	
7	Shinko Seiko FC Clair	18	5	2	11	15	42	−27	12	
8	Asahi Kokusai Bunnys	18	4	2	12	14	84	−70	10	
9	Matsushita Electric LSC Bambina	18	1	2	15	6	63	−57	4	
10	Fujita Tendai SC Mercury	18	1	1	16	9	74	−65	3	

== League awards ==
=== Best player ===
Player	Club
(Japan) Takako Tezuka	Yomiuri SC Ladies Beleza

=== Top scorers ===
Rank	Scorer	Club	Goals
1	(Japan) Takako Tezuka	Yomiuri SC Ladies Beleza	17

=== Best eleven ===
Pos	Player	Club
GK	(Japan) Shiho Onodera	Yomiuri SC Ladies Beleza
DF	(Japan) Kyoko Kuroda	Prima Ham FC Kunoichi
DF	(Japan) Chiaki Shimamura	Yomiuri SC Ladies Beleza
DF	(Japan) Ryoko Uno	Yomiuri SC Ladies Beleza
DF	(Japan) Sayuri Yamaguchi	Suzuyo Shimizu FC Lovely Ladies
MF	(Japan) Asako Takakura	Yomiuri SC Ladies Beleza
MF	(China) Li Xiufu	Prima Ham FC Kunoichi
MF	(Japan) Satoko Matsuda	Prima Ham FC Kunoichi
FW	(China) Jyuko Kun	Prima Ham FC Kunoichi
FW	(Japan) Akemi Noda	Yomiuri SC Ladies Beleza
FW	(Japan) Takako Tezuka	Yomiuri SC Ladies Beleza

=== Best young player ===
Player	Club
(Japan) Yumi Obe	Nikko Securities Dream Ladies

== See also ==
- Empress's Cup
