= Zhong Honglian =

Chinese footballer

Personal information
- Date of birth: 27 October 1967 (age 59)

International career
Years	Team	Apps	(Gls)
1996	China		
Medal record
Women's football
Representing China
Olympic Games
Silver medal – second place	1996 Atlanta	Team
Asian Games
Gold medal – first place	1990 Beijing	Team
Gold medal – first place	1994 Hiroshima	Team

Zhong Honglian (Chinese: 钟红莲, born 27 October 1967) is a female Chinese football (soccer) player who competed in the 1996 Summer Olympics.

In 1996 she won the silver medal with the Chinese team. She was the backup goalkeeper behind Gao Hong.
