= Ma Li (footballer) =

Chinese footballer

Ma Li 马莉
Personal information
- Full name: Ma Li
- Date of birth: 3 March 1969 (age 57)
- Height: 1.71 m (5 ft 7 in)
- Position: Defender

Senior career*
Years	Team	Apps	(Gls)
- Beijing
- Matsushita Denki

International career^{‡}
- China
Medal record
Women's football
Representing China
Asian Games
Gold medal – first place	1990 Beijing	Team
- * Club domestic league appearances and goals as of 15 June 2015 ‡ National team caps and goals as of 15 June 2015

Ma Li (Chinese: 马莉; born 3 March 1969) is a Chinese former footballer who played for the China women's national football team.

== International career ==
At the 1991 FIFA Women's World Cup, central defender Ma played the full 80 minutes in all four of China's games. The hosts reached the quarter-finals before losing 1–0 to Sweden. Ma scored the first ever goal at a FIFA Women's World Cup after 22 minutes of the opening match; China's 4–0 win over eventual finalists Norway on 16 November 1991. She headed Wu Weiying's free kick from the right flank past Norway's goalkeeper Reidun Seth.

== International goals ==
No.	Date	Venue	Opponent	Score	Result	Competition
1.	16 November 1991	Tianhe Stadium, Guangzhou, China	Norway	1–0	4–0	1991 FIFA Women's World Cup

== Personal life ==
Ma later emigrated to Brazil, where as of April 2016 she was working as a businesswoman.
