= 1997 AFC Women's Championship =

1997年亞足聯女子亞洲杯

Tournament details
- Host country: China
- Dates: 5–14 December
- Teams: 11 (from 1 confederation)

Final positions
- Champions: China (6th title)
- Runners-up: North Korea
- Third place: Japan
- Fourth place: Chinese Taipei

Tournament statistics
- Matches played: 19
- Goals scored: 132 (6.95 per match)
- Top scorer(s): (Japan) Homare Sawa (13 goals)
- Best player: (China) Liu Ailing
- Fair play award: China

The 1997 AFC Women's Championship was a women's football tournament held in the province Guangdong, China between 5 and 14 December 1997. It was the 11th staging of the AFC Women's Championship. The 1997 AFC Women's Championship, consisting of eleven teams, served as the AFC's qualifying tournament for the 1999 FIFA Women's World Cup. Asia's three berths were given to the two finalists - China and Korea DPR - and the winner of the third place play-off, Japan.

== Group stage ==
=== Group A ===
Team	Pld	W	D	L	GF	GA	GD	Pts
Japan	3	3	0	0	31	0	+31	9
India	3	2	0	1	13	1	+12	6
Hong Kong	3	1	0	2	1	12	−11	3
Guam	3	0	0	3	0	32	−32	0

Source: RSSSF
5 December 1997

India	3–0	Hong Kong
Tababi Devi 23'; Lokeshwari Devi 58', 80'	Report

Panyu Ying Tung Stadium, Panyu
5 December 1997

Japan	21–0	Guam
Kae Nishina; Homare Sawa (7x); Yuko Morimoto; Miyuki Yanagita; Mayumi Omatsu; Nami Otake (6X); Tamaki Uchiyama (3X); Rie Yamaki	Report

Panyu Ying Tung Stadium, Panyu

7 December 1997

Hong Kong	1–0	Guam
	Report

Panyu Ying Tung Stadium, Panyu
7 December 1997

Japan	1–0	India
Homare Sawa	Report

Panyu Ying Tung Stadium, Panyu

9 December 1997

Japan	9–0	Hong Kong
Rie Yamaki; Yumi Toumei; Homare Sawa (3X); Yuko Morimoto; Miyuki Yanagita; Tomomi Mitsui; Tamaki Uchiyama	Report

Panyu Ying Tung Stadium, Panyu
9 December 1997

India	10–0	Guam
Chaoba Devi (3X); Lokeshwari Devi (5X); Tababi Devi (2X)	Report

Panyu Ying Tung Stadium, Panyu

=== Group B ===
Team	Pld	W	D	L	GF	GA	GD	Pts
China	3	3	0	0	27	1	+26	9
North Korea	3	2	0	1	23	4	+19	6
Uzbekistan	3	1	0	2	2	17	−15	3
Philippines	3	0	0	3	2	32	−30	0

Source: RSSSF
5 December 1997

China	3–1	North Korea
Liu Ailing 3', 88'; Fan Yunjie 17'	Report	Kim Kum-sil 83'

Guangdong Provincial Stadium, Guangzhou
5 December 1997

Uzbekistan	2–1	Philippines
Karima; Gulnara	Report

Guangdong Provincial Stadium, Guangzhou

7 December 1997

China	8–0	Uzbekistan
Jin Yan 15', 46', 62', 74'; Zhao Lihong 30'; Wei Haiying 33', 41'; Liu Ying 67'	Report

Guangdong Provincial Stadium, Guangzhou
7 December 1997

North Korea	14–1	Philippines
	Report

Guangdong Provincial Stadium, Guangzhou

9 December 1997

China	16–0	Philippines
	Report

Guangdong Provincial Stadium, Guangzhou
9 December 1997

North Korea	8–0	Uzbekistan
	Report

Guangdong Provincial Stadium, Guangzhou

=== Group C ===
Team	Pld	W	D	L	GF	GA	GD	Pts
Chinese Taipei	2	2	0	0	7	0	+7	6
South Korea	2	1	0	1	11	1	+10	3
Kazakhstan	2	0	0	2	0	17	−17	0

Source: RSSSF
5 December 1997

Chinese Taipei	1–0	South Korea
Hsu Ching-Hsin 88'	Report

Zhaoqing Sports Center, Zhaoqing

7 December 1997

South Korea	11–0	Kazakhstan
	Report

Zhaoqing Sports Center, Zhaoqing

9 December 1997

Chinese Taipei	6–0	Kazakhstan
	Report

Zhaoqing Sports Center, Zhaoqing

== Knockout stage ==
=== Semi-finals ===
Winners qualified for 1999 FIFA Women's World Cup

12 December 1997

North Korea	1–0	Japan
Kim Kum-sil 3'	Report

Guangdong Provincial Stadium, Guangzhou
12 December 1997

China	10–0	Chinese Taipei
Sun Wen 2', 5'; Liu Ailing 36', 43', 45', 85'; Sun Qingmei 42', 55'; Shui Qingxia 46'; Jin Yan 70'	Report

Guangdong Provincial Stadium, Guangzhou

=== Third place match ===
Winner qualified for 1999 FIFA Women's World Cup

14 December 1997

Japan	2–0	Chinese Taipei
Homare Sawa 20', 39'	Report

Guangdong Provincial Stadium, Guangzhou

=== Final ===
14 December 1997

China	2–0	North Korea
Liu Ailing 49', 65'	Report

Guangdong Provincial Stadium, Guangzhou

== Awards ==
1997 AFC Women's Championship winners

China
Sixth title

== Goalscorers ==
There were 132 goals scored in 19 matches, for an average of 6.95 goals per match.

13 goals

- (Japan) Homare Sawa

6 goals

- (Japan) Nami Otake

4 goals

- (Japan) Tamaki Uchiyama

2 goals

- (Japan) Miyuki Yanagita
- (Japan) Rie Yamaki
- (Japan) Yuko Morimoto

1 goal

- (Japan) Kae Nishina
- (Japan) Mayumi Omatsu
- (Japan) Yumi Toumei
- (Uzbekistan) Yuldasheva Karima
- (Uzbekistan) Azamova Gulnara
