= Zhou Hua =

Chinese footballer

Personal information
- Date of birth: 3 October 1969 (age 57)
- Position: Midfielder

International career^{‡}
Years	Team	Apps	(Gls)
- China
Medal record
Women's football
Representing China
Asian Games
Gold medal – first place	1990 Beijing	Team
Gold medal – first place	1994 Hiroshima	Team
- ‡ National team caps and goals as of 5 June 1995 (before the 1995 FIFA Women's World Cup)

Zhou Hua (born 3 October 1969) is a Chinese footballer who played as a midfielder for the China women's national football team. She was part of the team at the inaugural 1991 FIFA Women's World Cup and 1995 FIFA Women's World Cup.
