= Miyuki Izumi =

Japanese footballer

Miyuki Izumi 泉 美幸
Personal information
- Full name: Miyuki Izumi
- Date of birth: 31 May 1975 (age 51)
- Place of birth: Tokyo, Japan
- Height: 1.59 m (5 ft 2 1/2 in)
- Position: Forward

Senior career*
Years	Team	Apps	(Gls)
1989–1995	Tokyo Shidax LSC	85	(19)
1996–1998	Suzuyo Shimizu FC Lovely Ladies	30	(22)
1999–2006	Nippon TV Beleza	44	(26)
Total		159	(67)

International career
1996	Japan	5	(0)
Medal record
Nippon TV Beleza
Winner	Nadeshiko League	2000
Winner	Nadeshiko League	2001
Winner	Nadeshiko League	2002
Winner	Nadeshiko League	2005
Winner	Nadeshiko League	2006
Runner-up	Nadeshiko League	1999
Runner-up	Nadeshiko League	2003
Runner-up	Nadeshiko League	2004
Winner	Nadeshiko League Cup	1999
Runner-up	Nadeshiko League Cup	1997
Winner	Empress's Cup	2000
Winner	Empress's Cup	2004
Winner	Empress's Cup	2005
Runner-up	Empress's Cup	2002
Runner-up	Empress's Cup	2003
- * Club domestic league appearances and goals

Miyuki Izumi (泉 美幸, Izumi Miyuki; born 31 May 1975) is a former Japanese football player. She played for Japan national team.

== Club career ==
Izumi was born in Tokyo on 31 May 1975. In 1989, she joined Shinko Seiko FC Clair (later Tokyo Shidax LSC). In 1989 season, she was selected Young Player Awards. However, the club was disbanded in 1995. So, she moved to Suzuyo Shimizu FC Lovely Ladies. In 1998 season, she played 18 games and scored 21 goals. She became top scorer. However, the club was withdrew the L.League. So, in 1999, she moved to NTV Beleza (later Nippon TV Beleza). She retired end of 2006 season. She was also selected Best Eleven 2 times (1998 and 1999).

== National team career ==
On 16 May 1996, Izumi debuted for Japan national team against United States. She was a member of Japan for 1996 Summer Olympics. She played 5 games for Japan in 1996.

== National team statistics ==
Japan national team
Year	Apps	Goals
1996	5	0
Total	5	0
