= Chen Xia =

Chinese footballer

Personal information
- Date of birth: 26 November 1969 (age 56)
- Position: Defender

Senior career*
Years	Team	Apps	(Gls)
- Guangdong

International career^{‡}
- China
Medal record
Women's football
Representing China
Asian Games
Gold medal – first place	1990 Beijing	Team
- * Club domestic league appearances and goals ‡ National team caps and goals as of 16 November 1991 (before the 1991 FIFA Women's World Cup)

Chen Xia (born 26 November 1969) is a Chinese footballer who played as a defender for the China women's national football team. She was part of the team at the 1991 FIFA Women's World Cup. At the club level, she played for the team "Guangdong" in China.
