= 1989 L.League =

L. League
- Season: 1989
- Champions: Shimizu FC Ladies; 1st L. League title
- Top goalscorer: Chou Tai-ying (12 goals)

Statistics of L. League in the 1989 season. Shimizu FC Ladies won the championship.

== JLSL League standings ==
Pos	Team	Pld	W	D	L	GF	GA	GD	Pts	Qualification
1	Shimizu FC Ladies	10	8	1	1	38	12	+26	17	Champions
2	Yomiuri SC Ladies Beleza	10	8	1	1	27	4	+23	17	
3	Tasaki-Shinju Kobe Ladies	10	3	2	5	13	24	−11	8	
4	Shinko Seiko FC Clair	10	2	4	4	9	20	−11	8	
5	Nissan FC Ladies	10	2	3	5	8	16	−8	7	
6	Prima Ham FC Kunoichi	10	0	3	7	10	29	−19	3	

== League awards ==
=== Best player ===
Player	Club
(Japan) Etsuko Handa	Shimizu FC Ladies

=== Top scorers ===
Rank	Scorer	Club	Goals
1	(Taiwan) Chou Tai-ying	Shimizu FC Ladies	12

=== Best eleven ===
Pos	Player	Club
GK	(Japan) Masumi Misui	Yomiuri SC Ladies Beleza
DF	(Japan) Chiaki Shimamura	Yomiuri SC Ladies Beleza
DF	(Japan) Sayuri Yamaguchi	Shimizu FC Ladies
DF	(Japan) Rie Fujikawa	Shimizu FC Ladies
DF	(Japan) Mayumi Kaji	Tasaki-Shinju Kobe Ladies
MF	(Japan) Asako Takakura	Yomiuri SC Ladies Beleza
MF	(Japan) Akemi Noda	Yomiuri SC Ladies Beleza
MF	(Japan) Futaba Kioka	Shimizu FC Ladies
FW	(Japan) Etsuko Handa	Shimizu FC Ladies
FW	(Japan) Takako Tezuka	Yomiuri SC Ladies Beleza
FW	(Taiwan) Chou Tai-ying	Shimizu FC Ladies

=== Best young player ===
Player	Club
(Japan) Tomomi Nagano	Shimizu FC Ladies
(Japan) Nami Otake	Yomiuri SC Ladies Beleza
(Japan) Rie Yamaki	Nissan FC Ladies
(Japan) Miyuki Izumi	Shinko Seiko FC Clair

== See also ==
- Empress's Cup
