= Kazuhiko Takemoto =

Japanese footballer and manager

Kazuhiko Takemoto 竹本 一彦
Personal information
- Full name: Kazuhiko Takemoto
- Date of birth: November 22, 1955 (age 70)
- Place of birth: Aichi, Japan

Youth career
- Years: Team
- Waseda University

Managerial career
- 1986–1996: Yomiuri-Seiyu Beleza
- 2001: Gamba Osaka
- 2005: Kashiwa Reysol (caretaker)

Kazuhiko Takemoto (竹本 一彦, Takemoto Kazuhiko; born November 22, 1955) is a former Japanese football player and manager. His wife is former footballer Asako Takakura.

== Coaching career ==
Takemoto was born in Aichi Prefecture on November 22, 1955. He started coaching career at Yomiuri in 1980. He coached youth team and women's team Yomiuri-Seiyu Beleza until 1996. In 1999, he signed with Gamba Osaka and he became assistant coach until 2004. He also managed the club as Hiroshi Hayano's successor in 2001. In 2005, he moved to Kashiwa Reysol and he became assistant coach.

== Managerial statistics ==
Team	From	To	Record				
Team	From	To	G	W	D	L	Win %
Gamba Osaka	2001	2001	7	3	1	3	42.86
Total			7	3	1	3	42.86
