= Li Sa =

Chinese footballer

Personal information
- Date of birth: 3 January 1968 (age 58)
- Position: Goalkeeper

Senior career*
Years	Team	Apps	(Gls)
- Beijing

International career^{‡}
- China
Medal record
Women's football
Representing China
Asian Games
Gold medal – first place	1990 Beijing	Team
- * Club domestic league appearances and goals ‡ National team caps and goals as of 16 November 1991 (before the 1991 FIFA Women's World Cup)

Li Sa (born 3 January 1968) is a Chinese footballer who plays as a goalkeeper for the China women's national football team. She was part of the team at the inaugural 1991 FIFA Women's World Cup. At the club level, she played for the team "Beijing" in China.
