= Henriette Viker =

Norwegian footballer (born 1973)

Henriette Viker (born 5 August 1973) is a former Norwegian football player who played for the club Asker, and for the Norway women's national football team from 1997 to 1999.

She played on the Norwegian team that finished fourth at the 1999 FIFA Women's World Cup in United States.

Viker won the Norwegian league with Asker in 1998 and 1999.
