= Asako Takakura =

Japanese footballer and manager

Asako Takakura 高倉 麻子
Personal information
- Full name: Asako Takakura
- Date of birth: 19 April 1968 (age 58)
- Place of birth: Fukushima, Japan
- Height: 1.63 m (5 ft 4 in)
- Position: Midfielder

Senior career*
Years	Team	Apps	(Gls)
1981–1984	FC Jinnan		
1985–1998	Yomiuri Beleza	167	(30)
1999	Matsushita Electric Panasonic Bambina	14	(6)
2000	Silicon Valley Red Devils		
2001–2004	Speranza FC Takatsuki	45	(8)
Total		226	(44)

International career
1984–1999	Japan	79	(29)

Managerial career
- 2013–2014: Japan U-17
- 2014–2016: Japan U-20
- 2016–2021: Japan
- 2023–2025: Shanghai Women FC
Medal record
Yomiuri Beleza
Winner	Nadeshiko League	1990
Winner	Nadeshiko League	1991
Winner	Nadeshiko League	1992
Winner	Nadeshiko League	1993
Runner-up	Nadeshiko League	1989
Runner-up	Nadeshiko League	1994
Runner-up	Nadeshiko League	1997
Runner-up	Nadeshiko League	1998
Winner	Nadeshiko League Cup	1996
Runner-up	Nadeshiko League Cup	1997
Winner	Empress's Cup	1987
Winner	Empress's Cup	1988
Winner	Empress's Cup	1993
Winner	Empress's Cup	1997
Runner-up	Empress's Cup	1986
Runner-up	Empress's Cup	1991
Runner-up	Empress's Cup	1992
Runner-up	Empress's Cup	1996
Representing Japan
AFC Women's Asian Cup
Silver medal – second place	1986 China
Silver medal – second place	1991 Japan
Silver medal – second place	1995 Malaysia
Bronze medal – third place	1989 Hong Kong
Bronze medal – third place	1993 Malaysia
Asian Games
Silver medal – second place	1990 Beijing	Team
Silver medal – second place	1994 Hiroshima	Team
- * Club domestic league appearances and goals

Asako Takakura (高倉 麻子, Takakura Asako; born 19 April 1968), also known as Asako Takakura-Takemoto or Asako Takemoto due to her marriage, is a Japanese football manager and former player. She played for Japan national team. She is a former manager of the Japan national team. Her husband is former footballer Kazuhiko Takemoto.

== Club career ==
Takakura was born in Fukushima on 19 April 1968. In 1981, she joined FC Jinnan. In 1985, she moved to Yomiuri Beleza. The club won L.League title for 4 years in a row (1990–1993). She was selected MVP awards in 1992 and 1993 season. She was also selected Best Eleven 7 times (1989, 1991, 1992, 1993, 1994, 1997 and 1998). In 1999, her husband Kazuhiko Takemoto moved to Gamba Osaka. So, she moved to Matsushita Electric Panasonic Bambina (later Speranza FC Takatsuki) based in Osaka. In 2000, she moved to Women's Premier Soccer League club Silicon Valley Red Devils. In 2001, she returned to Speranza FC Takatsuki. End of 2004 season, she retired from playing career. She played 226 games in L.League.

== International career ==
On 17 October 1984, when Takakura was 16 years old, she debuted for Japan national team against Italy. She played at 1986, 1989, 1991, 1993, 1995, 1999 AFC Championship, 1990 and 1994 Asian Games. She was also a member of Japan for 1991, 1995 World Cup and 1996 Summer Olympics. She played 79 games and scored 29 goals for Japan until 1999.

== Managerial career ==
Takakura started her coaching career as an assistant coach of the Japan U-17 national team at the 2009 and 2011 AFC U-16 Championships. As manager of the Japan U-17 team, she led the youth team to the title of the 2013 AFC U-16 Championship by winning over North Korea in the final. Next year, she led to the title of the 2014 U-17 World Cup by winning over Spain in the final. She repeated the achievement by mentoring the Japan U-20 national team to help them win the title of the 2015 AFC U-19 Championship, again by defeating North Korea in the final.

On 27 April 2016, Takakura was appointed as the manager of the Japan senior national team becoming the first female to hold the post. She was also appointed as manager of the Japan U-20 team and won 3rd place at 2016 U-20 World Cup. In 2018, she led to the title of 2018 Asian Cup.

Takakura has been given the AFC Women's Coach Of The Year Award Six times; in 2012, 2013, 2014, 2015, 2017 and 2018.

== Career statistics ==
Appearances and goals by national team and year
National team	Year	Apps	Goals
Japan	1984	3	0
Japan	1985	0	0
Japan	1986	11	3
Japan	1987	3	4
Japan	1988	3	0
Japan	1989	6	3
Japan	1990	4	2
Japan	1991	12	4
Japan	1992	0	0
Japan	1993	5	6
Japan	1994	7	2
Japan	1995	9	0
Japan	1996	10	0
Japan	1997	0	0
Japan	1998	0	0
Japan	1999	6	5
Total		79	29

Scores and results list Japan's goal tally first, score column indicates score after each Takakura goal.

List of international goals scored by Asako Takakura
No.	Date	Venue	Opponent	Score	Result	Competition
1	19 July 1986	Italy	Italy	1–?	1–5	Friendly
2	18 December 1986	Tsuen Wan, Hong Kong	Malaysia	1–0	10–0	1986 AFC Women's Championship
3	18 December 1986	Tsuen Wan, Hong Kong	Malaysia	2–0	10–0	1986 AFC Women's Championship
4	19 December 1989	Kowloon, Hong Kong	Indonesia	5–0	11–0	1989 AFC Women's Championship
5	19 December 1989	Kowloon, Hong Kong	Indonesia	7–0	11–0	1989 AFC Women's Championship
6	19 December 1989	Kowloon, Hong Kong	Indonesia	11–0	11–0	1989 AFC Women's Championship
