= Man Yanling =

Chinese footballer

Personal information
- Date of birth: 9 November 1972 (age 53)
- Position: Defender

International career
Years	Team	Apps	(Gls)
- China
Medal record
Women's football
Representing China
Asian Games
Gold medal – first place	1998 Bangkok	Team

Man Yanling is a former Chinese football player. She was part of the Chinese team at the 1995 FIFA Women's World Cup and 1999 FIFA Women's World Cup, where the team placed fourth and second, respectively.
