= Shijingshan Stadium =

Sports venue in Beijing, China

Coordinates: 39°54′17″N 116°11′43″E

Shijingshan Stadium (Simplified Chinese: 石景山体育场) is a multi-use stadium in Beijing, China. It is currently used primarily for football matches. The stadium holds 20,000 people. Stadium construction commenced in February 1981 and was completed in October 1986.
