= Sun Qingmei =

Chinese footballer (born 1966)

Sun Qingmei 孙庆梅
Personal information
- Full name: Sun Qingmei
- Date of birth: June 19, 1966 (age 60)
- Place of birth: Handan, China
- Height: 1.62 m (5 ft 4 in)
- Position: Forward

Senior career*
Years	Team	Apps	(Gls)
1984–1991	Hebei		
1992–1997	Matsushita Denki		

International career^{‡}
1984–1997	China		
Medal record
Women's football
Representing China
Olympic Games
Silver medal – second place	1996 Atlanta	Team
Asian Games
Gold medal – first place	1990 Beijing	Team
Gold medal – first place	1994 Hiroshima	Team
- * Club domestic league appearances and goals as of July 29, 2015 ‡ National team caps and goals as of August 6, 2016

Sun Qingmei (Chinese: 孙庆梅; born June 19, 1966) is a Chinese former footballer who played for the China national team at the 1991 and 1995 editions of the FIFA Women's World Cup and won a silver medal at the 1996 Atlanta Olympics.

== Club career ==
During her childhood in Hebei, Sun's parents locked her in her bedroom in a bid to stop her playing football. She was a member of the state track and field team when she started football training in 1983 and joined the Hebei club in 1984. After the 1991 Women's World Cup, Sun accepted a transfer to the Japan Women's Football League with Matsushita Denki. She helped the Takatsuki, Osaka-based team win the league title in the 1994 season.

== International career ==
At the 1988 FIFA Women's Invitation Tournament in Guangdong she was part of the hosts' team who lost the third place play-off to Brazil. The Chinese press voted her into the tournament's official all-star team. At the 1991 FIFA Women's World Cup, Sun played the full 80 minutes in all four of China's games. The hosts reached the quarter-finals before losing 1–0 to Sweden. In the first ever FIFA Women's World Cup match, Sun scored the fourth goal in China's 4–0 win over eventual finalists Norway on 16 November 1991.

In 1996 Sun won the Olympic silver medal with the Chinese team. She played all five matches and scored three goals. She retired from football after helping China retain the AFC Women's Asian Cup at the 1997 AFC Women's Championship in December 1997.
