= 1991 AFC Women's Championship =

1991 AFC女子選手権

Tournament details
- Host country: Japan
- Dates: 26 May – 8 June
- Teams: 9 (from 1 confederation)

Final positions
- Champions: China (3rd title)
- Runners-up: Japan
- Third place: Chinese Taipei
- Fourth place: North Korea

Tournament statistics
- Matches played: 20
- Goals scored: 98 (4.9 per match)

The 1991 AFC Women's Championship was an international women's football tournament held in Fukuoka, Fukuoka Prefecture, Japan from 26 May to 8 June 1991. It was the 8th staging of the AFC Women's Championship. The 1991 AFC Women's Championship, consisting of nine teams, served as the AFC's qualifying tournament for the 1991 FIFA Women's World Cup. Asia's three berths were given to the two finalists - China and Japan - and the winner of the third place play-off, Chinese Taipei.

== Group stage ==
=== Group A ===
Team	Pld	W	D	L	GF	GA	GD	Pts
China	3	3	0	0	23	1	+22	6
Chinese Taipei	3	1	1	1	9	3	+6	3
Thailand	3	1	1	1	4	10	−6	3
South Korea	3	0	0	3	0	22	−22	0

Source: RSSSF
29 May 1991

China	3–0	Chinese Taipei
Shui Qingxia 13'; Sun Qingmei 40'; Niu Lijie 67'

Fukuoka
29 May 1991

Thailand	3–0	South Korea
Sunee Kridsanachandee 32'; Prapa Bourthong 42'; Anchalee Khaolaung 66'

Fukuoka
31 May 1991

Chinese Taipei	9–0	South Korea
Huang Yu-Chung 3', 32', 49'

Fukuoka
31 May 1991

China	10–1	Thailand
Niu Lijie 27', 28', 41', 76'; Zhu Tao ?'; Sun Wen ?', ?'		Anchalee Khaolaung ?'

Fukuoka
2 June 1991

Chinese Taipei	0–0	Thailand

Fukuoka
2 June 1991

China	10–0	South Korea

Fukuoka

=== Group B ===
Team	Pld	W	D	L	GF	GA	GD	Pts
Japan	4	4	0	0	27	1	+26	8
North Korea	4	3	0	1	25	1	+24	6
Hong Kong	4	1	1	2	3	9	−6	3
Malaysia	4	1	1	2	1	24	−23	3
Singapore	4	0	0	4	0	21	−21	0

Source: RSSSF
26 May 1991

Hong Kong	2–0	Singapore
Chan Shuk-Chi 16', 51'

Fukuoka
26 May 1991

Japan	1–0	North Korea
Kaori Nagamine 66'

Fukuoka

28 May 1991

Japan	4–1	Hong Kong
Takako Tezuka; Kaori Nagamine; Asako Takakura		Law Ka-Lai 17'

Fukuoka
28 May 1991

North Korea	12–0	Malaysia
Yang Mi-sun

Fukuoka

30 May 1991

North Korea	5–0	Hong Kong

Fukuoka
30 May 1991

Malaysia	1–0	Singapore

Fukuoka

1 June 1991

North Korea	8–0	Singapore
Yang Mi-sun

Fukuoka
1 June 1991

Japan	12–0	Malaysia
Takako Tezuka; Etsuko Handa; Kaori Nagamine; Akemi Noda; Yuriko Mizuma

Fukuoka

3 June 1991

Japan	10–0	Singapore
Riko Matsuda; Takako Tezuka; Akemi Noda; Asako Takakura; Sayuri Yamaguchi; Tamaki Uchiyama

Fukuoka
3 June 1991

Hong Kong	0–0	Malaysia

Fukuoka

== Knockout stage ==
=== Semi-finals ===
Winners qualified for 1991 FIFA Women's World Cup.

6 June 1991

China	1–0	North Korea
Zhang Yan 16'

Fukuoka
6 June 1991

Japan	0–0 (a.e.t.)	Chinese Taipei
Penalties
	5–4

Fukuoka

=== Third place match ===
Winner qualified for 1991 FIFA Women's World Cup.

8 June 1991

Chinese Taipei	0–0 (a.e.t.)	North Korea
Penalties
	5–4

Fukuoka

=== Final ===
8 June 1991

China	5–0	Japan

Fukuoka

== Awards ==
1991 AFC Women's Championship winners

China
Third title
