= Zhou Yang (footballer) =

Chinese footballer

Personal information
- Date of birth: 15 January 1971 (age 55)
- Place of birth: China
- Position: Midfielder

International career^{‡}
Years	Team	Apps	(Gls)
- China
Medal record
Women's football
Representing China
Asian Games
Gold medal – first place	1990 Beijing	Team
Gold medal – first place	1994 Hiroshima	Team
- ‡ National team caps and goals as of 5 June 1995 (before the 1995 FIFA Women's World Cup)

Zhou Yang (born 2 January 1971) is a Chinese footballer who played as a midfielder for the China women's national football team. She was part of the team at the inaugural 1991 FIFA Women's World Cup and 1995 FIFA Women's World Cup.. She now currently resides in California, and is the Director of Coaching and Head Coach in the Ace Athletics Youth Soccer Academy.

== International goals ==
No.	Date	Venue	Opponent	Score	Result	Competition
1.	21 November 1991	Foshan, China	New Zealand	1–0	4–1	1991 FIFA Women's World Cup
