= Zhu Tao (footballer) =

Chinese footballer

Personal information
- Date of birth: 20 November 1974 (age 51)
- Position: Midfielder

Senior career*
Years	Team	Apps	(Gls)
- Beijing

International career^{‡}
- China
Medal record
Women's football
Representing China
Asian Games
Gold medal – first place	1990 Beijing	Team
- * Club domestic league appearances and goals ‡ National team caps and goals as of 16 November 1991 (before the 1991 FIFA Women's World Cup)

Zhu Tao (born 20 November 1974) is a Chinese footballer who played as a midfielder for the China women's national football team. She was part of the team at the inaugural 1991 FIFA Women's World Cup. At the club level, she played for Beijing in China.
