= Zhang Yan (footballer, born 1972) =

Chinese footballer

Personal information
- Date of birth: 6 August 1972 (age 54)
- Place of birth: China
- Position: Forward

International career
| Years | Team | Apps | (Gls) |
| 1991, 1996 | China | | |
Medal record
Women's football
Representing China
Asian Games
| Gold medal – first place | 1990 Beijing | Team |

Zhang Yan (Chinese: 张岩; born 6 August 1972) is a Chinese former women's football player.

She participated in the 1996 Summer Olympics.
