= AFC Women's Asian Cup =

- Organiser(s): AFC
- Founded: 1975; 51 years ago
- Region: Asia and Australia
- Teams: 12 (finals); 35 (qualifiers)
- Qualifier for: FIFA Women's World Cup
- Related competitions: AFC Asian Cup
- Current champions: Japan (3rd title)
- Most championships: China (9 titles)
- 2029 AFC Women's Asian Cup

The AFC Women's Asian Cup (formerly known as the AFC Women's Championship) is a quadrennial competition in women's football for national teams which belong to the Asian Football Confederation (AFC). It is the oldest women's international football competition and premier women's football competition in the AFC region for national teams. The competition is also known as the Asian Women's Football Championship and the Asian Women's Championship. 21 tournaments have been held, with the current champions being Japan. Most competitions between 1991 and 2026 also served as the Asian qualifying tournament for the FIFA Women's World Cup.

== History ==
The competition was set up by the Asian Ladies Football Confederation (ALFC), a part of the AFC responsible for women's football. The first competition was held in 1975 and was held every two years after this, except for a period in the 1980s where the competition was held every three years. The ALFC was initially a separate organisation but was absorbed into the AFC in 1986.

From 1975 to 1981, matches were 60 minutes in duration.

The competition has been dominated by countries from the Pacific Rim or Eastern Asia (including East and Southeast Asia), with the China women's national football team having won 9 times, including a series of 7 consecutive victories as of 2022 edition. Countries from Central and West Asia have been rather less successful, with only Uzbekistan, Kazakhstan, Jordan and Iran having qualified so far. Eastern Asia has also been far more frequent in participating in the FIFA Women's World Cup, with five strongest women's teams of Asia (China, North Korea, Japan, Australia, and South Korea) hail from this part.

The tournament frequency changed to every 4 years effective from 2010, after AFC had announced that the Asian Cup will additionally serve as the qualification rounds of the 2015 FIFA Women's World Cup.

Until 2003, teams were invited by the AFC to compete. From 2006, a separate qualification was established and the number of teams will be decided by the merit by qualification process. The name of the tournament was also changed to as the "AFC Women's Asian Cup", to reflect the change and reforms of the competition.

The tournament was expanded from eight teams to twelve starting from the 2022 edition.

On 20 August 2023, AFC has decided to shift the AFC Women's Asian Cup to non-FIFA Women's World Cup odd years, which will see the edition after the upcoming 2026 AFC Women's Asian Cup takes place in 2029 instead of 2030.

On 13 September 2024, AFC announced the change in the format of their women's national team competitions, including a new qualifying format for the Women's Asian Cup. In addition, the Women's Asian Cup will no longer serve as Asian qualifying tournament for the FIFA Women's World Cup from 2031 and instead serve as qualification for AFC Women's Olympic Qualifying Tournament from 2028.

== Trophy ==
The current AFC Women’s Asian Cup trophy was manufactured by London-based company, Thomas Lyte. First presented in 2018, the trophy is made from 5.5kg of sterling silver, and sits at 52.5cm in height. The six handles represent the six countries which took part in the inaugural competition in 1975. The base of the trophy is decorated with the images of eight modern female footballers.

== Format ==
All of the 47 members of the AFC who have a women's national team are eligible to participate in the qualification tournament.

Starting from 2022 edition, a total of twelve teams participate in the final tournament including the hosts, top three finishers of the previous edition and eight teams from the qualification tournament.

== Results ==
Tournament names

- 1975–1983: Asian Cup Women's Tournament (Unofficial - Retrospectively semi official) - FIFA recognized women's football in 1986.
- 1986–2003: AFC Women's Championship
- 2006–present: AFC Women's Asian Cup

#	Year	Hosts	Final			Third-place match or losing semi-finalists			Teams
#	Year	Hosts	Champions	Score	Runners-up	Third place	Score	Fourth place	Teams
Asian Cup Women's Tournament organized by Asian Ladies Football Confederation (ALFC) - 1975 to 1981, matches were 60 minutes
1	1975	Hong Kong	New Zealand	3–1	Thailand	Australia (Note: Australia was represented by a team largely from the St. George club and the New South Wales state team. These games were recognised as official Australian international fixtures in 2023.)	5–0	Malaysia	6
2	1977	Republic of China	Taiwan (Note: Competes as Chinese Taipei since 1981, in compliance with the International Olympic Committee's Nagoya Resolution in 1979. Previously referred to as the Republic of China.)	3–1	Thailand	Singapore	2–0	Indonesia	6
3	1980	India	Taiwan	2–0	India S (Note: Host country India had two teams that played in this competition: India N and India S)	Hong Kong and Western Australia (Note: The match was cancelled as the Hong Kong team had already booked their flights home before kickoff, failing which they would have had to stay in India for a further four days for the next available flight to Hong Kong, which was impossible due to scheduling and logistical issues. Both teams were awarded joint third place.)			6
4	1981	Hong Kong	Mulan Taipei (Note: The team competed under the club name "Mulan Taipei". Chinese Taipei requested two other national teams to compete under the club name as well.)	5–0	Thailand	India	2–0	Hong Kong	8
5	1983	Thailand	Thailand	3–0	India	Malaysia	0–0 (5–4 p)	Singapore	6
AFC Women's Championship organized by Asian Football Confederation (AFC)
6	1986	Hong Kong	China	2–0	Japan	Thailand	3–0	Indonesia	7
7	1989	Hong Kong	China	1–0	Chinese Taipei	Japan	3–1	Hong Kong	8
8	1991	Japan	China	5–0	Japan	Chinese Taipei	0–0 (a.e.t.) (5–4 p)	North Korea	9
9	1993	Malaysia	China	3–0	North Korea	Japan	3–0	Chinese Taipei	9
10	1995	Malaysia	China	2–0	Japan	Chinese Taipei	0–0 (a.e.t.) (3–0 p)	South Korea	11
11	1997	China	China	2–0	North Korea	Japan	2–0	Chinese Taipei	11
12	1999	Philippines	China	3–0	Chinese Taipei	North Korea	3–2	Japan	15
13	2001	Republic of China	North Korea	2–0	Japan	China	8–0	South Korea	14
14	2003	Thailand	North Korea	2–1 (a.e.t./g.g.)	China	South Korea	1–0	Japan	14
AFC Women's Asian Cup organized by Asian Football Confederation (AFC)
15	2006	Australia	China	2–2 (a.e.t.) (4–2 p)	Australia	North Korea	3–2	Japan	9
16	2008	Vietnam	North Korea	2–1	China	Japan	3–0	Australia	8
17	2010	China	Australia	1–1 (a.e.t.) (5–4 p)	North Korea	Japan	2–0	China	8
18	2014	Vietnam	Japan	1–0	Australia	China	2–1	South Korea	8
19	2018	Jordan	Japan	1–0	Australia	China	3–1	Thailand	8
20	2022	India	China	3–2	South Korea	Japan and Philippines			12
21	2026	Australia	Japan	1–0	Australia	China and South Korea			12
22	2029	Uzbekistan							12

== Teams reaching the top four ==
Nation	Champions	Runners-up	Third place	Fourth place	Semi-finalists	Total
China	9	2	3	1	1	16
Japan	3	4	5	3	1	16
North Korea	3	3	2	1	0	9
Chinese Taipei	3	2	2	2	0	9
Australia (Note: Include Western Australia)	1	4	1	1	1	8
Thailand	1	3	1	1	0	6
New Zealand	1	0	0	0	0	1
India	0	2	1	0	0	3
South Korea	0	1	1	3	1	6
Malaysia	0	0	1	1	0	2
Singapore	0	0	1	1	0	2
Hong Kong	0	0	0	2	1	3
Indonesia	0	0	0	2	0	2
Philippines	0	0	0	0	1	1
Total	21	21	18	18	6	82

== Overall team records ==
In this ranking 3 points are awarded for a win, 1 for a draw and 0 for a loss. As per statistical convention in football, matches decided in extra time are counted as wins and losses, while matches decided by penalty shoot-outs are counted as draws. Teams are ranked by total points, then by goal difference, then by goals scored.

As of 2026 AFC Women's Asian Cup

Rank	Team	Part	M	W	D	L	GF	GA	GD	Points
1	China	16	80	65	5	10	377	41	+336	200
2	Japan	18	87	61	6	20	394	61	+333	189
3	Chinese Taipei	15	69	40	6	22	179	93	+86	126
4	North Korea	11	58	39	6	13	256	42	+214	123
5	Thailand	17	69	34	2	33	115	171	−56	104
6	South Korea	14	59	31	8	20	173	84	+89	101
7	Australia	9	46	25	7	14	100	49	+51	82
8	India	10	39	16	4	19	65	77	−12	52
9	Hong Kong	14	57	11	4	42	26	191	−165	37
10	Vietnam	9	33	11	1	21	39	92	−53	34
11	Uzbekistan	6	21	8	0	13	19	78	−59	24
12	Philippines	11	41	7	2	32	26	198	−172	23
13	Singapore	7	27	7	1	19	21	115	−94	22
14	Malaysia	9	34	5	3	26	20	161	−141	18
15	Indonesia	5	17	4	1	12	17	77	−60	13
16	New Zealand	1	4	4	0	0	11	3	+8	12
17	Kazakhstan	3	9	2	2	5	16	39	−23	8
18	Myanmar	5	17	2	2	13	16	56	−40	8
19	Guam	4	15	1	0	14	5	112	−107	3
20	Iran	2	6	0	1	5	0	21	−21	1
21	Bangladesh	1	3	0	0	3	0	11	−11	0
22	Jordan	2	6	0	0	6	5	29	−24	0
23	Nepal	3	10	0	0	10	1	66	−65	0

== Comprehensive team results by tournament ==
Team	(Hong Kong) 1975 (6)	(Taiwan) 1977 (6)	(India) 1980 (6)	(Hong Kong) 1981 (8)	(Thailand) 1983 (6)	(Hong Kong) 1986 (7)	(Hong Kong) 1989 (8)	(Japan) 1991 (9)	(Malaysia) 1993 (8)	(Malaysia) 1995 (11)	(China) 1997 (11)	(Philippines) 1999 (15)	(Taiwan) 2001 (14)	(Thailand) 2003 (14)	(Australia) 2006 (9)	(Vietnam) 2008 (8)	(China) 2010 (8)	(Vietnam) 2014 (8)	(Jordan) 2018 (8)	(India) 2022 (12)	(Australia) 2026 (12)	(Uzbekistan) 2029 (12)	Years
Australia	3rd	OFC member	SF	OFC member											2nd	4th	1st	2nd	2nd	QF	2nd		9
Bangladesh	—N/a	—N/a	—N/a	—N/a	—N/a	—N/a	—N/a	—N/a	—N/a	—N/a	—N/a	—N/a	—N/a	—N/a	—N/a	—N/a	—N/a	—N/a	—N/a	—N/a	GS		1
China						1st	1st	1st	1st	1st	1st	1st	3rd	2nd	1st	2nd	4th	3rd	3rd	1st	SF		16
Chinese Taipei	—N/a	1st	1st	1st	—N/a	—N/a	2nd	3rd	4th	3rd	4th	2nd	GS	GS	GS	GS	—N/a	—N/a	—N/a	QF	QF		15
Guam	—N/a	—N/a	—N/a	—N/a	—N/a	—N/a	—N/a	—N/a	—N/a	—N/a	GS	GS	GS	GS	—N/a	—N/a	—N/a	—N/a	—N/a	—N/a	—N/a		4
Hong Kong	GS	GS	SF	4th	GS	GS	4th	GS	GS	GS	GS	GS	GS	GS	—N/a	—N/a	—N/a	—N/a	—N/a	—N/a	—N/a		14
India	—N/a	—N/a	2nd	3rd	2nd	—N/a	—N/a	—N/a	—N/a	GS	GS	GS	GS	GS	—N/a	—N/a	—N/a	—N/a	—N/a	WD (Note: India failed to name the required 13 players and were unable to play their match of the group stage against Chinese Taipei due to them having only fewer than 13 players left with the remaining team members testing positive for COVID-19. They were considered to have withdrawn from the competition, and all previous matches played by them were considered "null and void" and would not be considered in determining the final group rankings.)	GS		10
Indonesia	—N/a	4th	—N/a	GS	—N/a	4th	GS	—N/a	—N/a	—N/a	—N/a	—N/a	—N/a	—N/a	—N/a	—N/a	—N/a	—N/a	—N/a	GS	—N/a		5
Iran	—N/a	—N/a	—N/a	—N/a	—N/a	—N/a	—N/a	—N/a	—N/a	—N/a	—N/a	—N/a	—N/a	—N/a	—N/a	—N/a	—N/a	—N/a	—N/a	GS	GS		2
Japan	—N/a	GS	—N/a	GS	—N/a	2nd	3rd	2nd	3rd	2nd	3rd	4th	2nd	4th	4th	3rd	3rd	1st	1st	SF	1st		18
Jordan	—N/a	—N/a	—N/a	—N/a	—N/a	—N/a	—N/a	—N/a	—N/a	—N/a	—N/a	—N/a	—N/a	—N/a	—N/a	—N/a	—N/a	GS	GS	—N/a	—N/a		2
Kazakhstan	Part of Soviet Union							—N/a	—N/a	GS	GS	GS	—N/a	UEFA member									3
North Korea	—N/a	—N/a	—N/a	—N/a	—N/a	—N/a	GS	4th	2nd	—N/a	2nd	3rd	1st	1st	3rd	1st	2nd	—N/a	—N/a	—N/a	QF		11
South Korea	—N/a	—N/a	—N/a	—N/a	—N/a	—N/a	—N/a	GS	GS	4th	GS	GS	4th	3rd	GS	GS	GS	4th	5th	2nd	SF		14
Malaysia	4th	—N/a	GS	—N/a	3rd	GS	—N/a	GS	GS	GS	—N/a	GS	GS	—N/a	—N/a	—N/a	—N/a	—N/a	—N/a	—N/a	—N/a		9
Myanmar	—N/a	—N/a	—N/a	—N/a	—N/a	—N/a	—N/a	—N/a	—N/a	—N/a	—N/a	—N/a	—N/a	GS	GS	—N/a	GS	GS	—N/a	GS	—N/a		5
Nepal	—N/a	—N/a	—N/a	—N/a	—N/a	GS	GS	—N/a	—N/a	—N/a	—N/a	GS	—N/a	—N/a	—N/a	—N/a	—N/a	—N/a	—N/a	—N/a	—N/a		3
New Zealand	1st	OFC member																					1
Philippines	—N/a	—N/a	—N/a	GS	GS	—N/a	—N/a	—N/a	GS	GS	GS	GS	GS	GS	—N/a	—N/a	—N/a	—N/a	6th	SF	QF		11
Singapore	GS	3rd	—N/a	GS	4th	—N/a	—N/a	GS	—N/a	—N/a	—N/a	—N/a	GS	GS	—N/a	—N/a	—N/a	—N/a	—N/a	—N/a	—N/a		7
Thailand	2nd	2nd		2nd	1st	3rd	GS	GS		GS		GS	GS	GS	GS	GS	GS	5th	4th	QF	—N/a		17
Uzbekistan	Part of Soviet Union							—N/a	—N/a	GS	GS	GS	GS	GS	—N/a	—N/a	—N/a	—N/a	—N/a	—N/a	QF	Q	7
Vietnam	—N/a	—N/a	—N/a	—N/a	—N/a	—N/a	—N/a	—N/a	—N/a	—N/a	—N/a	GS	GS	GS	GS	GS	GS	6th	GS	QF	GS		10

== Awards ==
Year	Most Valuable Player	Top Scorer	Goals	Best goalkeeper	Fairplay Award
2006	(China) Ma Xiaoxu	(Japan) Yūki Nagasato (South Korea) Jung Jung-suk	7	Not awarded	China
2008	(Japan) Homare Sawa	(North Korea) Ri Kum-suk	7	Not awarded	Japan
2010	(North Korea) Jo Yun-mi	(Japan) Kozue Ando (Japan) Homare Sawa (North Korea) Jo Yun-mi (South Korea) Yoo Young-a	3	Not awarded	China
2014	(Japan) Aya Miyama	(China) Yang Li (South Korea) Park Eun-sun	6	Not awarded	Japan
2018	(Japan) Mana Iwabuchi	(China) Li Ying	7	Not awarded	Japan
2022	(China) Wang Shanshan	(Australia) Sam Kerr	7	(China) Zhu Yu	South Korea
2026	(Australia) Alanna Kennedy	(Japan) Riko Ueki	6	(Japan) Ayaka Yamashita	Japan

== Winning coaches ==
Year	Team	Coach
1975	New Zealand	(New Zealand) Dave Farrington
1977	Taiwan	(Taiwan) Liu Jun-tse
1980	Taiwan	(Taiwan) Chang Teng-yun
1981	Mulan Taipei	(Taiwan) Kao Yong
1983	Thailand	(Thailand) Fuengwit Thongpramul
1986	China	(China) Cong Zheyu
1989	China	(China) Shang Ruihua
1991	China	(China) Shang Ruihua
1993	China	(China) Ma Yuanan
1995	China	(China) Ma Yuanan
1997	China	(China) Ma Yuanan
1999	China	(China) Ma Yuanan
2001	North Korea	(North Korea) Ri Song-gun
2003	North Korea	(North Korea) Ri Song-gun
2006	China	(China) Ma Liangxing
2008	North Korea	(North Korea) Kim Kwang-min
2010	Australia	(Scotland) Tom Sermanni
2014	Japan	(Japan) Norio Sasaki
2018	Japan	(Japan) Asako Takakura
2022	China	(China) Shui Qingxia
2026	Japan	(Denmark) Nils Nielsen

== See also ==
- AFC Women's Asian Cup qualification
- AFC Women's Olympic Qualifying Tournament
- AFC U-20 Women's Asian Cup
- AFC U-17 Women's Asian Cup
- Football at the Asian Games
- AFF Women's Championship
- CAFA Women's Championship
- EAFF E-1 Football Championship (women)
- SAFF Women's Championship
- WAFF Women's Championship
- AFC Asian Cup
