= Niu Lijie =

Chinese footballer

Personal information
- Date of birth: 12 April 1969 (age 57)
- Place of birth: China
- Position: Defender

International career
| Years | Team | Apps | (Gls) |
| 1991–1996 | China | | |
Medal record
Women's football
Representing China
Olympic Games
| Silver medal – second place | 1996 Atlanta | Team |
Asian Games
| Gold medal – first place | 1990 Beijing | Team |
| Gold medal – first place | 1994 Hiroshima | Team |

Niu Lijie (born 12 April 1969) is a Chinese former football player who played for the China women's national football team. She represented China at the 1996 Summer Olympics and the inaugural 1991 FIFA Women's World Cup.

== International goals ==
Scores and results list China's goal tally first.

| No. | Date | Venue | Opponent | Score | Result | Competition |
|---|---|---|---|---|---|---|
| 1. | 14 December 1986 | Hong Kong | Japan | 2–0 | 2–0 | 1986 AFC Women's Championship |
| 2. | 16 December 1986 | Hong Kong | Malaysia | 1–0 | 10–0 | 1986 AFC Women's Championship |
| 3. | 16 December 1986 | Hong Kong | Malaysia | ?–0 | 10–0 | 1986 AFC Women's Championship |
| 4. | 16 December 1986 | Hong Kong | Malaysia | ?–0 | 10–0 | 1986 AFC Women's Championship |
| 5. | 21 December 1986 | Hong Kong | Indonesia | ?–0 | 9–0 | 1986 AFC Women's Championship |
| 6. | 23 December 1986 | Hong Kong | Japan | 1–0 | 2–0 | 1986 AFC Women's Championship |
| 7. | 23 December 1986 | Hong Kong | Japan | 2–0 | 2–0 | 1986 AFC Women's Championship |
| 12. | 3 October 1990 | Beijing, China | South Korea | 2–0 | 8–0 | 1990 Asian Games |
| 13. | 3 October 1990 | Beijing, China | South Korea | 3–0 | 8–0 | 1990 Asian Games |
| 14. | 3 October 1990 | Beijing, China | South Korea | 4–0 | 8–0 | 1990 Asian Games |
| 15. | 3 October 1990 | Beijing, China | South Korea | 5–0 | 8–0 | 1990 Asian Games |
| 16. | 3 October 1990 | Beijing, China | South Korea | 6–0 | 8–0 | 1990 Asian Games |
| 17. | 3 October 1990 | Beijing, China | South Korea | 7–0 | 8–0 | 1990 Asian Games |

== See also ==
- China at the 1996 Summer Olympics
