= Zhao Lihong =

Chinese footballer (born 1972)

Personal information
- Full name: Zhao Lihong
- Date of birth: 4 December 1972 (age 53)
- Place of birth: Yingde, China
- Height: 1.68 m (5 ft 6 in)
- Position: Midfielder

Senior career*
Years	Team	Apps	(Gls)
1988–2001	Guangdong FC		
2002	Philadelphia Charge	17	(2)
2003–200?	Guangdong FC		

International career
1992–2003	China	182	
Medal record
Women's football
Representing China
Olympic Games
Silver medal – second place	1996 Atlanta	Team
Asian Games
Gold medal – first place	1994 Hiroshima	Team
Gold medal – first place	1998 Bangkok	Team
Silver medal – second place	2002 Busan	Team
FIFA Women's World Cup
Runner-up	1999 United States
- * Club domestic league appearances and goals

Zhao Lihong (simplified Chinese: 赵利红; traditional Chinese: 趙利紅; pinyin: Zhào Lìhóng; born 4 December 1972) is a Chinese former footballer who played as a midfielder. She competed in the 1996 Summer Olympics and in the 2000 Summer Olympics.

In 1996 she won the silver medal with the Chinese team. She played all five matches and scored one goal.

Four years later she was a member of the Chinese team which finished fifth in the women's tournament. She played all three matches and scored one goal.

She played for the Philadelphia Charge in the Women's United Soccer Association in 2002.

== International goals ==
No.	Date	Venue	Opponent	Score	Result	Competition
1.	10 December 1993	Kuching, Malaysia	Japan	1–1	3–1	1993 AFC Women's Championship

== See also ==
- List of women's footballers with 100 or more international caps
