= Ri Ae-gyong =

North Korean footballer

Personal information
- Date of birth: 12 September 1971 (age 55)
- Position: Defender

International career^{‡}
Years	Team	Apps	(Gls)
	North Korea	3	(0)
- ‡ National team caps and goals as of 29 June 1999 (before the 1999 FIFA Women's World Cup)

Ri Ae-gyong (born 12 September 1971,Korean: 리애경) is a North Korean women's international footballer who plays as a defender. She is a member of the North Korea women's national football team. She was part of the team at the 1999 FIFA Women's World Cup.
