= Li Xiufu =

Chinese footballer

Personal information
- Date of birth: 28 June 1965 (age 61)
- Position: Midfielder

Senior career*
Years	Team	Apps	(Gls)
- Prima Ham FC

International career^{‡}
- China
Medal record
Women's football
Representing China
Asian Games
Gold medal – first place	1990 Beijing	Team
- * Club domestic league appearances and goals ‡ National team caps and goals as of 16 November 1991 (before the 1991 FIFA Women's World Cup)

Li Xiufu (born 28 June 1965) is a Chinese footballer who played as a midfielder for the China women's national football team. She was part of the team at the inaugural 1991 FIFA Women's World Cup as the team captain. At the club level, she played for Prima Ham FC in Japan.
