= Wu Weiying =

Chinese footballer

Personal information
- Date of birth: 19 January 1969 (age 57)
- Position: Forward

Senior career*
| Years | Team | Apps | (Gls) |
- Guangdong

International career^{‡}
- China
Medal record
Women's football
Representing China
Asian Games
| Gold medal – first place | 1990 Beijing | Team |
- * Club domestic league appearances and goals ‡ National team caps and goals as of 16 November 1991 (before the 1991 FIFA Women's World Cup)

Wu Weiying (born 19 January 1969) is a Chinese footballer who played as a forward for the China women's national football team. She was part of the team at the inaugural 1991 FIFA Women's World Cup. At the club level, she played for Guangdong in China.

== International goals ==
| No. | Date | Venue | Opponent | Score | Result | Competition |
|---|---|---|---|---|---|---|
| 1. | 18 December 1989 | Kowloon, Hong Kong | Chinese Taipei | 1–0 | 1–0 | 1989 AFC Women's Championship |
| 2. | 21 December 1989 | Kowloon, Hong Kong | North Korea | 1–0 | 4–1 | 1989 AFC Women's Championship |
| 3. | 21 December 1989 | Kowloon, Hong Kong | North Korea | 3–1 | 4–1 | 1989 AFC Women's Championship |
| 4. | 23 December 1989 | Kowloon, Hong Kong | Thailand | 2–1 | 3–1 | 1989 AFC Women's Championship |
| 5. | 21 November 1991 | Foshan, China | New Zealand | 3–0 | 4–1 | 1991 FIFA Women's World Cup |
