= Ri Kyong-ae =

North Korean footballer

Personal information
- Date of birth: 4 December 1972 (age 53)
- Position: Midfielder

International career^{‡}
Years	Team	Apps	(Gls)
	North Korea	1	(3)
- ‡ National team caps and goals as of 29 June 1999 (before the 1999 FIFA Women's World Cup)

Ri Kyong-ae (born 4 December 1972,Korean: 리경애) is a North Korean women's international footballer who plays as a midfielder. She is a member of the North Korea women's national football team. She was part of the team at the 1999 FIFA Women's World Cup.
