= Football at the 1990 Asian Games – Women's tournament =

Women at the 1990 Asian Games
- Venue: Shijingshan Stadium; Haidian Stadium
- Date: 27 September – 6 October
- Nations: 6

Medalists
gold medal	China
silver medal	Japan
bronze medal	North Korea

The women's football tournament at the 1990 Asian Games was held from 27 September to 6 October 1990 in Beijing, China.

== Venues ==
Beijing
Shijingshan Stadium	Haidian Stadium
Capacity: 20,000	Capacity: 10,000

== Results ==
Pos	Team	Pld	W	D	L	GF	GA	GD	Pts
1	China	5	5	0	0	26	0	+26	10
2	Japan	5	3	1	1	17	8	+9	7
3	North Korea	5	2	2	1	19	3	+16	6
4	Chinese Taipei	5	2	1	2	13	4	+9	5
5	South Korea	5	1	0	4	2	30	−28	2
6	Hong Kong	5	0	0	5	0	32	−32	0

Source: RSSSF
27 September

Hong Kong	0–5	Chinese Taipei

Beijing

27 September

North Korea	7–0	South Korea
Ri Hong-sil 3'; Ju Jeong-ae 14', 46'; Yang Mi-soon 21'; Ri Kyong-ae 38'; Ri Keum-hwa 40', 42'

Beijing

27 September

China	5–0	Japan
Zhang Yan 1'; Wu Weiying 7'; Li Xiufu 16'; Tang Kunyuan 46'; Niu Lijie 63'

Haidian Stadium, Beijing

29 September
15:00

North Korea	0–0	Chinese Taipei

Beijing

29 September

Japan	8–1	South Korea
Kioka 22', 34'; Nagamine 40', 46'; Handa 64'; Noda 73'; Hironaka 75'; Mizuma 77'		Han Eun-kyung 49'

Haidian Stadium, Beijing

29 September

China	10–0	Hong Kong
Niu Lijie 3', 19', 27'; Zhou Yang 15'; Tang Kunyuan 36'; Zhang Yan 41', 70', 80'; Liu Ailing 60'; Zhu Tao 71'

Beijing

1 October

Hong Kong	0–5	Japan
		Kioka (?); Handa (?); Nagamine (?); Matsuda (?)

Shijingshan Stadium, Beijing

1 October

China	2–0	North Korea
Zhang Yan 2', 47'

Beijing

1 October

South Korea	0–7	Chinese Taipei
		Ko Chiao-lin 39', 46'; Yen Chun-me 64'; Chou Tai-ying 68', 75', 78', 80'

Beijing

3 October

Chinese Taipei	1–3	Japan
[[]]		Handa (?); Nagamine (?)

Haidian Stadium, Beijing

3 October

China	8–0	South Korea
Zhang Yan 2'; Niu Lijie 9', 27', 33', 35', 61', 72'; Wu Weiying 80'

Beijing

3 October

North Korea	11–0	Hong Kong

Beijing

6 October

Japan	1–1	North Korea
Mizuma (?)		? (?)

Shijingshan Stadium, Beijing

6 October

Hong Kong	0–1	South Korea

Beijing

6 October

China	1–0	Chinese Taipei
Liu Ailing 52'

Beijing

== Goalscorers ==
There were 77 goals scored in 15 matches, for an average of 5.13 goals per match.

10 goals

- (China) Niu Lijie

7 goals

- (China) Zhang Yan

4 goals

- (Japan) Futaba Kioka
- (Japan) Etsuko Handa
- (Japan) Kaori Nagamine

2 goals

- (China) Liu Ailing
- (China) Tang Kunyuan
- (China) Wu Weiying
- (Japan) Yuriko Mizuma

1 goal

- (China) Li Xiufu
- (China) Zhou Yang
- (China) Zhu Tao
- (Japan) Akemi Noda
- (Japan) Kazuko Hironaka
- (Japan) Michiko Matsuda
- (South Korea) Han Eun-kyung
