= Football at the 1994 Asian Games – Women's tournament =

Women at the 1994 Asian Games
- Venue: Fukuyama Stadium
- Date: 3–12 October
- Competitors: 72 from 4 nations

Medalists
gold medal	China
silver medal	Japan
bronze medal	Chinese Taipei

The women's football tournament at the 1994 Asian Games was held from 3 October to 12 October 1994 in Hiroshima, Japan. This tournament also served as Asian qualification round for 1995 FIFA Women's World Cup with top-2 teams would qualify.

== Results ==
All times are Japan Standard Time (UTC+09:00)

=== Preliminary round ===
Pos	Team	Pld	W	D	L	GF	GA	GD	Pts
1	Japan	3	2	1	0	9	1	+8	7
2	China	3	2	1	0	8	1	+7	7
3	Chinese Taipei	3	1	0	2	2	8	−6	3
4	South Korea	3	0	0	3	0	9	−9	0

Source: RSSSF
3 October
15:00

Chinese Taipei	0–5	China
		Chen Yufeng 46'; Niu Lijie 50'; Shui Qingxia 61', 65'; Sun Wen 85'

Fukuyama Stadium, Fukuyama

4 October
15:00

Japan	5–0	South Korea
Noda ?'; Otake ?'; Uchiyama ?'; Nagamine ?', ?'

Fukuyama Stadium, Fukuyama

6 October
15:00

Chinese Taipei	0–3	Japan
		Noda ?'; Takakura ?'; Kioka ?'

Fukuyama Stadium, Fukuyama

7 October
15:00

China	2–0	South Korea
Sun Wen

Fukuyama Stadium, Fukuyama

9 October
15:00

Chinese Taipei	2–0	South Korea
Chou Tai-ying; Lin Mei-chun

Fukuyama Stadium, Fukuyama

10 October
15:00

China	1–1	Japan
Goal		Otake ?'

Fukuyama Stadium, Fukuyama

=== Gold medal match ===
12 October
18:00

Japan	0–2	China
		Chen Yufeng 21'; Sun Wen 47'

Fukuyama Stadium, Fukuyama

== Goalscorers ==
There were 21 goals scored in 3 matches, for an average of 7 goals per match.

3 goals

- (China) Sun Wen

2 goals

- (Japan) Akemi Noda
- (Japan) Kaori Nagamine
- (Japan) Nami Otake

1 goal

- (China) Chen Yufeng
- (Chinese Taipei) Chou Tai-ying
- (Chinese Taipei) Lin Mei-chun
- (Japan) Asako Takakura
- (Japan) Futaba Kioka
- (Japan) Tamaki Uchiyama

== Final standing ==
Rank	Team	Pld	W	D	L	GF	GA	GD	Pts
1st place, gold medalist(s)	China	4	3	1	0	10	1	+9	10
2nd place, silver medalist(s)	Japan	4	2	1	1	9	3	+6	7
3rd place, bronze medalist(s)	Chinese Taipei	3	1	0	2	2	8	−6	3
4	South Korea	3	0	0	3	0	9	−9	0
