= J.League =

Association football league in Japan

- Founded: 1 November 1991; 35 years ago
- First season: 1993
- Country: Japan
- Confederation: AFC
- Divisions: J1 League; J2 League; J3 League
- Number of clubs: 60
- Level on pyramid: 1–3
- Domestic cup(s): Emperor's Cup; Fujifilm Super Cup
- League cup: J.League YBC Levain Cup
- International cup(s): AFC Champions League Elite; AFC Champions League Two
- Current champions: J1: Kashima Antlers (9th title); J2: Mito HollyHock (1st title); J3: Tochigi City (1st title) (2025 season)
- Most championships: J1: Kashima Antlers (9 titles); J2: Hokkaido Consadole Sapporo (3 titles); J3: Blaublitz Akita (2 titles)
- Broadcasters: J1: DAZN; J2: DAZN; J3: DAZN/Lemino
- Website: Official website
- Current: 2026–27 J1 League; 7 August 2026 – 5–6 June 2027 2026–27 J2 League; 8–9 August 2026 – 22–23 May 2027 2026–27 J3 League; 8–9 August 2026 – 22–23 May 2027

The Japan Professional Football League (Japanese: 日本プロサッカーリーグ, Hepburn: Nihon Puro Sakkā Rīgu), a.k.a. J.League (Jリーグ, Jē Rīgu), and officially known as the Meiji Yasuda J.League (明治安田Jリーグ) for sponsorship with Meiji Yasuda Life, is the association football league in Japan. It is responsible for organizing Japan's major professional football competitions, including the J1, J2 and J3 leagues. Established in 1993 as Japan's first professional football league, it has been one of the most successful leagues in Asia. Originally founded as a single division, in 1999, the second division J2 League was established, followed by the third division J3 League in 2013.

== History ==
=== Before the professional league (pre-1992) ===
Before the inception of the J.League, the highest level of club football was the Japan Soccer League (JSL), which consisted of amateur clubs. Despite being well-attended during the boom of the late 1960s and early 1970s (when Japan's national team won the Olympic bronze medal at the 1968 games in Mexico), the JSL went into decline in the 1980s, in general line with the deteriorating situation worldwide. Fans were few, the grounds were not of the highest quality, and the Japan national team was not on a par with the other Asian powerhouses. To raise the level of play domestically, to attempt to garner more fans, and to strengthen the national team, the Japan Football Association (JFA) decided to form a professional league. During this era, Japanese football investors traveled exclusively to Europe to find a possible model; eventually, the Japanese embraced the model of Germany's Bundesliga to develop its own professional league.

The professional association football league, J.League was formed in 1992, with eight clubs drawn from the JSL First Division, one from the Second Division, and the newly formed Shimizu S-Pulse. At the same time, JSL changed its name to Japan Football League, becoming a semi-professional league. Although the J.League did not officially launch until 1993, the Yamazaki Nabisco Cup competition was held between the ten clubs in 1992 to prepare for the inaugural season.

=== Inaugural season and J.League boom (1993–1995) ===
J.League officially kicked off its first season with ten clubs on 15 May 1993, when Verdy Kawasaki hosted Yokohama Marinos at the Tokyo National Stadium.

=== After the boom (1996–1999) ===
Despite the success in the first three years, in early 1996 the league attendance declined rapidly, coincided with the economic slump of Japan. In 1997, the average attendance was 10,131, compared to more than 19,000 in 1994. Yokohama Flügels were merged with Yokohama Marinos due to the withdrawal of one of their major sponsors, right after they became the winners of the 1998 Emperor's Cup on 1 January 1999.

=== Change of infrastructure and game formats (1999–2004) ===
The league's management realized that they were heading in the wrong direction. In order to solve the problem, the management came out with two solutions.

First, they announced the J.League Hundred Year Vision, in which they aim to make 100 professional association football clubs in the nation of Japan by 2092, which would be the hundredth season. The league also encouraged the clubs to promote football or non-football related sports and health activities, to acquire local sponsorships, and to build good relationships with their hometowns at the grass-root level. The league believed that this would allow the clubs to bond with their respective cities and towns and get support from local government, companies, and citizens. In other words, clubs would be able to rely on the locals, rather than major national sponsors.

Second, the infrastructure of the league was heavily changed in 1999. The league acquired nine clubs from the semi-professional JFL and one club from J. League to create a two-division system. The top flight became the J.League Division 1 (J1) with 16 clubs while J.League Division 2 (J2) was launched with ten clubs in 1999. The second-tier Japan Football League (former), now became third-tier Japan Football League.

Also, until 2004 (with the exception of 1996 season), the J1 season was divided into two. At the end of each full season, the champion from each half played a two-legged series to determine the overall season winner and runners-up. Júbilo Iwata in 2002, and Yokohama F. Marinos in 2003, won both "halves" of the respective seasons, thus eliminating the need for the playoff series. This was the part of the reason the league abolished the split-season system starting from 2005.

=== European League Format & AFC Champions League (2005–2008) ===
Since the 2005 season, J.League Division 1 consisted of 18 clubs (from 16 in 2004) and the season format became similar to the European club football. The number of relegated clubs also increased from 2 to 2.5, with the third-from-bottom club going into Promotion / relegation Series with the third-placed J2 club. Since then, other than minor adjustments, the top flight has stayed consistent.

Japanese teams did not treat the Asian Champions League that seriously in the early years, in part due to the distances travelled and teams played. However, in the 2008 Champions League, three Japanese sides made the quarter-finals.

However, in the recent years, with the inclusion of the A-League in Eastern Asia, the introduction of FIFA Club World Cup, and increased marketability in the Asian continent, both the league and the clubs paid more attention to Asian competition. For example, Kawasaki Frontale built up a notable fan base in Hong Kong, owing to their participation in the AFC Champions League during the 2007 season. Continuous effort led to the success of Urawa Red Diamonds in 2007 and Gamba Osaka in 2008. Thanks to excellent league management and competitiveness in Asian competition, the AFC awarded J.League the highest league ranking and a total of four slots starting from the 2009 season. The league took this as an opportunity to sell TV broadcasting rights to foreign countries, especially in Asia.

Also starting the 2008 season, Emperor's Cup Winner was allowed to participate in the upcoming Champions League season, rather than waiting a whole year (i.e. 2005 Emperor's Cup winner, Tokyo Verdy, participated in the 2007 ACL season, instead of the 2006 season). In order to fix this one-year lag issue, the 2007 Emperor's Cup winner, Kashima Antlers' turn was waived. Nonetheless, Kashima Antlers ended up participating in the 2009 ACL season by winning the J.League title in the 2008 season.

=== Modern phase (2009–2014) ===
Three major changes were seen starting in the 2009 season. First, starting that season, four clubs entered the AFC Champions League. Secondly, the number of relegation slots increased to three. Finally, the AFC Player slot was implemented starting this season. Each club will be allowed to have a total of four foreign players; however, one slot is reserved for a player that derives from an AFC country other than Japan. Also, as a requirement of being a member of the Asian Football Confederation, the J.League Club License regulations started in 2012 as one criterion of whether a club was allowed to stay in its division or to be promoted to a higher tier in the professional level league. No major changes happened to J.League Division 1 as the number of clubs stayed at 18.

=== Three-stage system (2015–present) ===
From 2015 the J.League system changed to a three-stage system. The year is split into first and second league stages, followed by a third and final championship stage. The third stage is composed of stage one and two's total point champions and up to four other teams. These additional four teams consist of the following: Stage one and stage two's top point accumulator, and stage one and two's second placed points accumulator. These five teams then take part in a championship playoff stage to decide the winner of the league trophy.

In 2017, the single-table format returned due to a negative reaction from hardcore fans and a failure to appeal to casual fans.

Promotion and relegation between J3 and the JFL began in the 2023 season. The J.League will transition to a fall–spring calendar beginning in the 2026–27 season to align with European competitions and the Asian Champions League as well as avoid summer matches and conflicts with international tournaments. The change was approved on December 19, 2023, following a vote of the 60 J.League clubs.

=== Timeline ===
Year	Important events	# J clubs (J1/J2/J3)	# ACL clubs	Rel. slots (J1/J2)
1989	JFA forms a professional league assessment committee.			
1990	The committee decides the criteria for professional clubs; Fifteen to twenty clubs from Japan Soccer League applies for the professional league membership			
1991				
1992	The professional league, J.League is formed with the following 10 clubs: Gamba Osaka, JEF United Ichihara, Nagoya Grampus Eight, Sanfrecce Hiroshima, Urawa Red Diamonds, Verdy Kawasaki, Yokohama Flügels, and Yokohama Marinos (pre-existing from the old JSL First Division); Kashima Antlers (promoted from the old Second Division); Shimizu S-Pulse (newly formed, non-company club).; Japan Soccer League becomes second-tier Japan Football League (former); J.League hosts the first domestic league cup competition with the ten clubs			
1993	The J.League officially kicks off its first season	10		
1994	Following clubs are promoted from Japan Football League: Júbilo Iwata and Bellmare Hiratsuka	12		
1995	Following clubs are promoted from Japan Football League: Cerezo Osaka and Kashiwa Reysol; The points system is introduced for the first time: a club receives 3 pts for any win, 1 pts for PK loss, and 0 pts for regulation or extra time loss.	14		
1996	Following clubs are promoted from Japan Football League: Kyoto Purple Sanga and Avispa Fukuoka; The league adopts single season format; J.League average attendance hits the record low 10,131	16		
1997	Following club is promoted from Japan Football League: Vissel Kobe; The league goes back to split-season format; The points system changes: a club receives 3 pts for the regulation win, 2 pts for extra-time win, 1 pt for PK win, and 0 pts for any loss.	17		
1998	Following club is promoted from Japan Football League: Consadole Sapporo; Yokohama Flügels announce that they will be dissolved into crosstown rivals Yokohama Marinos for the 1999 season; The league announces the J.League Hundred Year Vision; The league announces incorporation of two-division system for the 1999 season; The league hosts J.League Promotion Tournament to decide to promote and/or relegate clubs. As a result, Consadole Sapporo becomes the first club be to relegated.	18		
1999	The J.League adopts two divisions, as nine clubs from the former Japan Football League join Division 2, along with the relegated Consadole Sapporo: Montedio Yamagata, Vegalta Sendai, Omiya Ardija, Kawasaki Frontale, Ventforet Kofu, Sagan Tosu, FC Tokyo, Albirex Niigata, and Oita Trinita; Yokohama Marinos merge with Yokohama Flügels to become Yokohama F. Marinos; Penalty kick shootouts are abolished in both divisions; however, golden goal extra-time rules stayed; The points system changes: a club receives 3 pts for a regulation win, 2 pts for an extra time win, and 1 pt for a tie; Japan Football League (former) is also restructured, as it becomes the 3rd-tier Japan Football League.; Note: To distinguish between the former and the current JFL, the new JFL is pronounced Nihon Football League in Japanese.	16/10		2
2000		16/11		2
2001		16/12		2
2002		16/12	2	2
2003	Extra time is abolished in Division 1 and traditional 3–1–0 points system is adopted	16/12	2	2
2004	No automatic relegation this season, as the top flight expands to 18 clubs in the following season; Inception of the two-legged Promotion / relegation Series	16/12	2	0.5
2005	J.League Division 1 expands to 18 clubs; J.League Division 1 adopts singles-season format	18/12	2	2.5
2006	Away goals rule is adopted in Yamazaki Nabisco Cup and Promotion / relegation Series; The league forms J.League expansion committee; The league reintroduces J.League Associate Membership	18/13	2	2.5
2007	J.League champion qualifies to the FIFA Club World Cup as the host for next two seasons; Note: If a Japanese club wins the AFC Champions League, the host loses its right.: Urawa Red Diamonds becomes the first Japanese club to win the AFC Champions League since its rebranding in 2002.	18/13	2	2.5
2008	Gamba Osaka wins the 2008 AFC Champions League, the second straight championship by a J.League club.	18/15	2 + 1	2.5
2009	Four clubs enter AFC Champions League.; Implementation of a 4th foreign player slot, a.k.a. AFC player slot; Promotion / relegation Series is eliminated and 16th-place club is now relegated by default.	18/18	4	3
2010		18/19	4	3
2011	J.League champion qualifies to the FIFA Club World Cup as the host for next two seasons again	18/20	4	3
2012		18/22	4	3/1
2013		18/22	4	3/0.5
2014	The J.League adopts three divisions, as the following clubs join Division 3: Gainare Tottori (relegated from J2 League).; Blaublitz Akita, Fukushima United, Fujieda MYFC, Nagano Parceiro, FC Ryukyu, SC Sagamihara, YSCC Yokohama, FC Machida Zelvia, and Zweigen Kanazawa (pre-existing from Japan Football League).; Grulla Morioka (promoted directly from Japanese Regional Leagues' Tohoku Soccer League).; A J.League U-22 Selection is also included, composed of the best J1 and J2 youngsters to prepare them for the 2016 Olympics.; The Japan Football League becomes the nationwide fourth tier, and first tier for amateur clubs.	18/22/12	4	3/1.5
2015	J1 League goes back to split-season format	18/22/13	3+1	3/1.5
2016	J.League champion qualifies to the FIFA Club World Cup as the host.; Kashima Antlers became the first Asian team to reach the FIFA Club World Cup final.	18/22/16	3+1	3/1.5
2017	J1 League resumes single-season format	18/22/17	3+1	3/1
2018	Promotion / relegation Series is established again. J.League Cup changes to a 20-team format.	18/22/17	3+1	2.5/2
2019		18/22/18	2+2	2.5/2
2020	J.League is disrupted due to the COVID-19 pandemic in Japan, thus relegation slots have been reduced	18/22/19	2+2	0/0
2021	J1 League expands to 20 teams and J3 contracts to 15, both for the 2021 season only	20/22/15	3+1 → 4	4/4
2022	J1 League reduced to 18 teams and J3 expands to 18 for 2022 season only	18/22/18	3+1	2.5/2

Year	Important events	# J clubs (J1/J2/J3)	# ACL Elite clubs	# ACL Two clubs	Rel. slots (J1/J2/J3)
2023	J3 expands to 20 for 2023 season: relegation J3 to JFL will be introduced.; J1 expand and J2 reduce to 20 teams each in J. League from 2024.	18/22/20	3+1	-	1/2/0–2
2024	J1 expand return and J2 reduced to 20 teams since 2021 and 2011 respectively from 2024 season on.: The three divisions of the J. Leagues will consist of 20 teams for the 2024 season	20/20/20	2+1	1	3/3/0–2

== Stance in the Japanese football pyramid ==
2025 season
Level(s)	League(s)/Division(s)
I	J1 League; 20 clubs
II	J2 League; 20 clubs
III	J3 League; 20 clubs

Since the inception of the second division in 1999, promotion and relegation follow a pattern similar to the European leagues, where the two bottom clubs of J1 and the top two clubs of J2 are guaranteed to move. From the 2004 to 2008 season, the third-placed J2 club entered the Promotion / relegation Series against the sixteenth-placed J1 club and the winner had a right to play in the top flight in the following year. Starting on the 2009 season, the top three J2 clubs receives J1 promotion by default in place of three bottom J1 clubs. However, promotion or right to play the now-defunct pro/rel series relies on the J2 clubs meeting the requirements for J1 franchise status set by the league. This has generally not been a hindrance; in fact, no club has yet been denied promotion due to not meeting the J1 criteria.

Until the 2004 season, the J1 season was divided into two halves, with an annual championship series involving the champions from each half (with the exception of the 1996 season). However, from the 2005 season, the single-season format is adopted as the top flight was expanded to eighteen clubs. Currently, 18 clubs compete in double round robin, home and away. Starting on the 2008 season, the top three clubs, along with the Emperor's Cup winner receive ACL berths for the following season. If the Emperor's Cup winner happens to be one of the top three J1 finishers, the 4th-place club receives the final berth. Starting on the 2009 season, the bottom three clubs are relegated to Division 2 at the end of the year. The two-halves format returned in 2015 but was abandoned again after 2016.

Starting in 2012, Division 2 established promotion playoffs for the clubs ranked 3rd to 6th, in a manner similar to the EFL Championship in England, the Serie B in Italy and the Segunda División in Spain. However, the semifinals would be only one leg and all matches that ended in draws would enable the higher ranked club in the table to advance or be promoted.

In 2013 the J3 League was established and while its champion was promoted automatically, the runner-up had to play a promotion/relegation series until 2017. From 2018 to 2023 two clubs was promoted automatically. From 2024 onwards, Division 3 established promotion playoffs for the clubs ranked 3rd to 6th respectively and winner playoff entered third team promotion.

From 2023 onwards, J. League introduce promotion and relegation between J3 and JFL.

The three divisions of the J. League will consist of 20 teams from 2024 season.

== Crest ==
Non sponsored logo

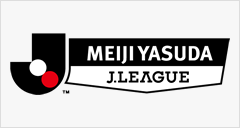
This logo was used from 2015 to 2018

Japanese version logo

== Clubs ==
=== Membership requirements ===
The requirements for joining the J. League include items such as the stadium, management status and team management status. Regarding team management, not only the team itself that actually participates in the J. League game, but also the management obligation of the club youth team by the training organization (subordinate organization) are stipulated. From the 2013 season, the J. League club license system was launched and the system for judging whether or not to join the J.League and the division that can join was updated.

In addition since 2006, it has been decided to certify clubs that meet the criteria for joining the J. League after 2014, it will be called J. League 100 Year Plan club status instead.

=== List of member clubs ===
Club categories and listing order based on club composition for 2026-27 season. As for the home stadium, the stadium shown on the J. League corporate site as of 2026-27 is described. Regarding the descriptions in multiple materials, based on the description of the club guide on the J. League official website, the stadium name was based on the naming rights (see the article of each stadium for the handling of naming rights).

Area	Club Name (Name)	Activity area/Hometown (Home stadium)	League	Year Joined
Hokkaido	Hokkaido Consadole Sapporo	All roads centered on Sapporo, Hokkaido (Daiwa House PREMIST DOME, Toyohira ward, Sapporo)	J2	1998
Tōhoku	Vanraure Hachinohe	Hachinohe, Aomori (Prifoods Stadium, Hachinohe)	J2	2019
Tōhoku	Vegalta Sendai	Sendai, Miyagi (Yurtec Stadium Sendai, Izumi Ward, Sendai)	J2	1999
Tōhoku	Blaublitz Akita	Akita, Akita (SOYU STADIUM, Akita)	J2	2014
Tōhoku	Montedio Yamagata	Tendo, Yamagata (NDsoft Stadium Yamagata, Yamagata)	J2	1999
Tōhoku	Fukushima United	Fukushima, Fukushima (TOHO Stadium, Fukushima)	J3	2014
Tōhoku	Iwaki FC	Iwaki, Fukushima (Hawaiians Stadium Iwaki, Iwaki)	J2	2022
Kantō	Kashima Antlers	Kashima, Ibaraki (Mercari Stadium, Kashima)	J1	1993
Kantō	Mito HollyHock	Mito, Ibaraki (K's denki Stadium Mito, Mito)	J1	2000
Kantō	Tochigi SC	Utsunomiya, Tochigi (Kanseki Stadium Tochigi, Utsunomiya)	J3	2009
Kantō	TOCHIGI CITY	Tochigi, Tochigi (CITY FOOTBALL STATION, Tochigi)	J2	2025
Kantō	Thespa Gunma	Maebashi, Gunma (Shoda Shoyu Stadium Gunma, Maebashi)	J3	2005
Kantō	Urawa Red Diamonds	Saitama, Saitama (Saitama Stadium 2002,Midori-ku Saitama)	J1	1991
Kantō	RB Omiya Ardija	Saitama, Saitama (NACK5 Stadium Ōmiya,Ōmiya-ku Saitama)	J2	1999
Kantō	JEF United Chiba	Chiba, Chiba (Fukuda Denshi Arena, Chiba)	J1	1991
Kantō	Kashiwa Reysol	Kashiwa, Chiba (Sankyo Frontier Kashiwa Stadium, Kashiwa)	J1	1995
Kantō	FC Tokyo	Chōfu, Tokyo (Ajinomoto Stadium, Chōfu)	J1	1999
Kantō	Tokyo Verdy	Inagi, Tokyo (Ajinomoto Stadium, Chōfu)	J1	1991
Kantō	Machida Zelvia	Machida, Tokyo (Machida GION Stadium, Machida)	J1	2012
Kantō	Kawasaki Frontale	Kawasaki, Kanagawa (Uvance Todoroki Stadium by Fujitsu, Kawasaki)	J1	1991
Kantō	Yokohama F. Marinos	Yokohama, Kanagawa (Nissan Stadium, Kōhoku-ku, Yokohama)	J1	1991
Kantō	Yokohama FC	Yokohama, Kanagawa (NHK Spring Mitsuzawa Football Stadium, Kanagawa-ku, Yokohama)	J2	2001
Kantō	Shonan Bellmare	Hiratsuka, Kanagawa (Lemon Gas Stadium Hiratsuka, Hiratsuka)	J2	1994
Kantō	SC Sagamihara	Sagamihara, Kanagawa (SAGAMIHARA GION STADIUM, Sagamihara)	J3	2014
Kantō	Ventforet Kofu	Kōfu, Yamanashi (JIT Recycle Ink Stadium, Kōfu)	J2	1999
Hokuriku and Shin'etsu ↓ Hokushinetsu	Matsumoto Yamaga	Matsumoto, Nagano (SUNPRO ALWIN, Matsumoto)	J3	2012
Hokuriku and Shin'etsu ↓ Hokushinetsu	Nagano Parceiro	Nagano, Nagano (Nagano U Stadium, Nagano)	J3	2014
Hokuriku and Shin'etsu ↓ Hokushinetsu	Albirex Niigata	Niigata, Niigata (DENKA BIG SWAN STADIUM, Niigata)	J2	1999
Hokuriku and Shin'etsu ↓ Hokushinetsu	Kataller Toyama	Toyama, Toyama (Toyama Stadium, Toyama)	J2	2009
Hokuriku and Shin'etsu ↓ Hokushinetsu	Zweigen Kanazawa	Kanazawa, Ishikawa (Kanazawa Go Go Curry Stadium, Kanazawa)	J3	2014
Tōkai	Shimizu S-Pulse	Shimizu-ku, Shizuoka, Shizuoka (IAI Stadium Nihondaira, Shimizu)	J1	1991
Tōkai	Jubilo Iwata	Iwata, Shizuoka (Yamaha Stadium(Iwata), Iwata)	J2	1994
Tōkai	Fujieda MYFC	Fujieda, Shizuoka (Fujieda Soccer Stadium, Fujieda)	J2	2014
Tōkai	Nagoya Grampus	Nagoya, Aichi (Toyota Stadium, Toyota)	J1	1991
Tōkai	FC Gifu	Gifu, Gifu (HIMARAYA STADIUM GIFU, Gifu)	J3	2008
Kansai	Reilac Shiga FC	Kusatsu, Shiga (Heiwado HATO Stadium)	J3	2026
Kansai	Kyoto Sanga	Kyoto, Kyoto (SANGA STADIUM by KYOCERA, Kameoka)	J1	1996
Kansai	Gamba Osaka	Suita, Osaka Prefecture (Panasonic Stadium Suita, Suita)	J1	1991
Kansai	Cerezo Osaka	Osaka, Osaka Prefecture (YANMAR HANASAKA STADIUM, Nagai Park, Higashisumiyoshi-ku, Osaka)	J1	1995
Kansai	FC Osaka	Higashiōsaka, Osaka (Higashiosaka Hanazono Rugby Stadium, Higashiōsaka)	J3	2023
Kansai	Vissel Kobe	Kobe, Hyōgo (NOEVIR Stadium Kobe, Kobe)	J1	1997
Kansai	Nara Club	Nara, Nara (Rohto Field Nara, Nara)	J3	2023
Chūgoku	Gainare Tottori	Tottori, Tottori (Axis Bird Stadium, Tottori)	J3	2011
Chūgoku	Fagiano Okayama	Okayama, Okayama (JFE Harenokuni Stadium, Okayama)	J1	2009
Chūgoku	Sanfrecce Hiroshima	Hiroshima, Hiroshima (Edion Peace Wing Hiroshima, Hiroshima)	J1	1991
Chūgoku	Renofa Yamaguchi	Yamaguchi, Yamaguchi (Ishin Me-Life Stadium, Yamaguchi)	J3	2015
Shikoku	Kamatamare Sanuki	Takamatsu, Kagawa (SHIKOKU KASEI MEGLIO STADIUM, Marugame)	J3	2014
Shikoku	Tokushima Vortis	Tokushima, Tokushima (POCARI SWEAT STADIUM, Naruto)	J2	2005
Shikoku	Ehime FC	Matsuyama, Ehime (Ningineer Stadium, Matsuyama)	J3	2006
Shikoku	FC Imabari	Imabari, Ehime (ASICS SATOYAMA STADIUM, Imabari)	J2	2020
Shikoku	Kochi United SC	Kōchi, Kōchi, Kōchi (GIKEN Stadium,Kōchi)	J3	2025
Kyushu	Avispa Fukuoka	Fukuoka, Fukuoka (BEST DENKI STADIUM, Hakata ward)	J1	1996
Kyushu	Giravanz Kitakyushu	Kitakyushu, Fukuoka (MIKUNI WORLD STADIUM KITAKYUSHU, Kokurakita Ward)	J3	2010
Kyushu	Sagan Tosu	Tosu, Saga (EKIMAE REAL ESTATE STADIUM, Tosu)	J2	1999
Kyushu	V-Varen Nagasaki	Nagasaki, Nagasaki (PEACE STADIUM Connected by SoftBank, Nagasaki)	J1	2013
Kyushu	Roasso Kumamoto	Kumamoto, Kumamoto (EGAO Kenko Stadium, Higashi Ward)	J2	2008
Kyushu	Oita Trinita	Oita, Oita (Crasus Dome Oita, Oita)	J2	1999
Kyushu	Tegevajaro Miyazaki	Miyazaki, Miyazaki (Ichigo Miyazaki Shintomi FB Stadium, Shintomi)	J2	2021
Kyushu	Kagoshima United	Kagoshima, Kagoshima (Shiranami Stadium, Kagoshima)	J3	2016
Kyushu	FC Ryukyu	Okinawa (Okinawa Prefecture Athletic Stadium, Okinawa)	J3	2014

=== Clubs with J3 licenses ===
Clubs that have not joined the J. League but have been granted a J3 license for the 2023 season (including the J. League 100 year concept club).

Area	Club Name (Name)	Activity area/Hometown (Home stadium)	League	Year Approval	Year Withdrawal
Tohoku	ReinMeer Aomori	Aomori, Aomori Prefecture (New Aomori Prefecture General Sports Park)	JFL	2019	2023
Tokai	Veertien Mie	Kuwana, Mie Prefecture (Toin Stadium, Yokkaichi Central Greenery Stadium)	JFL	2019	2023
Shikoku	Kochi United	Kōchi, Kōchi Prefecture (Kochi Haruno Athletic Stadium)	JFL	2019	2023
Kyushu	Verspah Oita	Ōita, Ōita Prefecture (Ōita Sports Park)	JFL	2019	2023

=== J.League 100 Year Plan Club ===
The home stadium is at the time of approval of the 100-year plan club and at the time of J3 admission examination in 2020 Based on the official J. League release.

Area	Club Name (Name)	Activity area/Hometown (Home stadium)	League	Year Approval
Kantō	Tochigi City FC	Tochigi, Tochigi (City Football Station, Tochigi)	Kantō Soccer League Div. 1	2014
Kantō	Vonds Ichihara	Ichihara, Chiba (Ichihara Seaside Stadium, Ichihara)	Kantō Soccer League Div. 1	2020
Kantō	Nankatsu SC	Katsushika, Tokyo (Okudo Sports Center Park, Katsushika)	Kantō Soccer League Div. 1	2020
Kantō	Tokyo 23 FC	Special wards of Tokyo (Edogawa Stadium, Edogawa)	Kantō Soccer League Div. 1	2022
Kantō	Criacao Shinjuku	Shinjuku, Tokyo (AGF Field, Tokyo)	JFL	2021

=== Former clubs that were regular members of the J.League ===
Club Name (Name)	Activity area/Hometown (Home stadium)	Year
Yokohama Flügels	Yokohama, Kanagawa (Mitsuzawa Stadium, Yokohama)	1991–1998

=== Clubs that were former J.League associate members, associate members and Centennial Clubs ===
Club Name (Name)	Activity area/Hometown (Home stadium)	Year
Tosu Futures	Tosu, Saga (Ekimae Real Estate Stadium, Tosu)	1994–1996
Hamamatsu FC	Hamamatsu, Shizuoka (Honda Miyakoda Soccer Stadium, Hamana Ward)	1997
Tonan Maebashi	Maebashi, Gunma (Maebashi Athletic Stadium, Maebashi)	2013–2019
Tokyo Musashino City FC	Musashino, Tokyo (Musashino Municipal Athletic Stadium, Musashino)	2016–2020
Suzuka Point Getters	Suzuka, Mie (Mie Suzuka Sports Garden, Mie)	2021–2022
Cobaltore Onagawa	Onagawa, Miyagi; Onagawa Town Comprehensive Athletic Park, Onagawa	2022
Okinawa SV	Tomigusuku and Uruma, Okinawa (various in Okinawa)	2022–2023

== Champions ==
Year	J1 Champions	J2 Champions	J3 Champions
1993	Verdy Kawasaki	(Old JFL)	(Old JFL Div. 2)
1994	Verdy Kawasaki	(Old JFL)	No national third tier
1995	Yokohama Marinos	(Old JFL)	No national third tier
1996	Kashima Antlers	(Old JFL)	No national third tier
1997	Júbilo Iwata	(Old JFL)	No national third tier
1998	Kashima Antlers	(Old JFL)	No national third tier
1999	Júbilo Iwata	Kawasaki Frontale	(New JFL)
2000	Kashima Antlers	Consadole Sapporo	(New JFL)
2001	Kashima Antlers	Kyoto Purple Sanga	(New JFL)
2002	Júbilo Iwata	Oita Trinita	(New JFL)
2003	Yokohama F. Marinos	Albirex Niigata	(New JFL)
2004	Yokohama F. Marinos	Kawasaki Frontale	(New JFL)
2005	Gamba Osaka	Kyoto Purple Sanga	(New JFL)
2006	Urawa Red Diamonds	Yokohama FC	(New JFL)
2007	Kashima Antlers	Consadole Sapporo	(New JFL)
2008	Kashima Antlers	Sanfrecce Hiroshima	(New JFL)
2009	Kashima Antlers	Vegalta Sendai	(New JFL)
2010	Nagoya Grampus	Kashiwa Reysol	(New JFL)
2011	Kashiwa Reysol	FC Tokyo	(New JFL)
2012	Sanfrecce Hiroshima	Ventforet Kofu	(New JFL)
2013	Sanfrecce Hiroshima	Gamba Osaka	(New JFL)
2014	Gamba Osaka	Shonan Bellmare	Zweigen Kanazawa
2015	Sanfrecce Hiroshima	Omiya Ardija	Renofa Yamaguchi
2016	Kashima Antlers	Consadole Sapporo	Oita Trinita
2017	Kawasaki Frontale	Shonan Bellmare	Blaublitz Akita
2018	Kawasaki Frontale	Matsumoto Yamaga	FC Ryukyu
2019	Yokohama F. Marinos	Kashiwa Reysol	Giravanz Kitakyushu
2020	Kawasaki Frontale	Tokushima Vortis	Blaublitz Akita
2021	Kawasaki Frontale	Júbilo Iwata	Roasso Kumamoto
2022	Yokohama F. Marinos	Albirex Niigata	Iwaki FC
2023	Vissel Kobe	Machida Zelvia	Ehime FC
2024	Vissel Kobe	Shimizu S-Pulse	Omiya Ardija
2025	Kashima Antlers	Mito HollyHock	Tochigi City

== Promotion and relegation ==
=== Changes in the number of clubs promotion and relegation system ===
J1 Entry playoffs have been introduced from 2018, 2019 and 2022 respectively. Relegation from J1 to J2 introduced from 1999, J2 to J3 introduced from 2013 and J3 to JFL introduced from 2023. J1 Promotion playoff introduce from 2012 to 2017, reintroduced in 2023 onwards and J2 Promotion playoff to be introduce start from 2024.

In 1998, the J1 entry decision match was held. From 1999, a replacement system was introduced with the transition to a two-part system of J1 and J2. Since 2012, a replacement system has been introduced between J2 and the lower league (Japan Football League (JFL) in 2012, J3 after the 2013 postseason).

- Until the introduction of the J.League club license system in 2012, if a J2 club that obtained the right to be promoted to J1 through the examination by the J.League did not meet J1 standards, the promotion to J1 would be revoked, and the relegation to J2 from the 16th place in J1 would also be revoked. could have been used, but there have been no cases in which it has actually been applied.
- If a club that has received a loan from the official match stable holding fund cannot repay it by the repayment date, the club belonging to J1 will be demoted to J2 even if it is in the order to remain in J1, and the club belonging to J2 will be promoted to J1. However, the promotion will be postponed. It is unknown whether promotion will be postponed even if it is a rank that can be promoted to J2 in the clubs belonging to J3. However, at the end of the 2021 season, the only cases in which this system could have been applied in the past were Oita in 2013.
- After the 2012 postseason (entry in 2013), in order to enter the J1, J2 and J3 leagues, it is necessary to obtain a license for that league or higher under the club license system.
- If the number of matches that have been completed does not reach 75% of the total number of matches scheduled for the year in the J1/J2/J3 league, or if the number of matches in the category to which one belongs falls short of 50% of the total number of matches scheduled for that year. If there is a club that does not exist, the tournament will be disqualified and no promotion or relegation will take place.

Year	Teams	J1		JFL	Remarks
Year	Teams	Number	JFL Relegation	J League Entry	Remarks
1993	10	10	No Relegation	Bellmare Hiratsuka; Júbilo Iwata	Old JFL
1994	12	12	No Relegation	Cerezo Osaka; Kashiwa Reysol	Old JFL
1995	14	14	No Relegation	Avispa Fukuoka; Kyoto Purple Sanga	Old JFL
1996	16	16	No Relegation	Vissel Kobe	Old JFL
1997	17	17	No Relegation	Consadole Sapporo	Old JFL

Year	Teams	J1		J2			JFL	Remarks
Year	Teams	Number	J2 Relegation	J1 Promotion	Number	JFL Relegation	J League Entry	Remarks
1998	18	18	Consadole Sapporo	—			9 clubs from old JFL (Note: 9 clubs: Vegalta Sendai, Montedio Yamagata, Omiya Ardija, FC Tokyo, Kawasaki Frontale, Ventforet Kofu, Albirex Niigata, Sagan Tosu and Oita Trinita.)	J1 Entry playoff introduced
1999	26	16	Urawa Red Diamonds; Bellmare Hiratsuka	Kawasaki Frontale; FC Tokyo	10	No Relegation	Mito HollyHock	2 teams automatically relegation from J1 to J2
2000	27	16	Kyoto Purple Sanga; Kawasaki Frontale	Consadole Sapporo; Urawa Red Diamonds	11	No Relegation	Yokohama FC	2 teams automatically relegation from J1 to J2
2001	28	16	Avispa Fukuoka; Cerezo Osaka	Kyoto Purple Sanga; Vegalta Sendai	12	No Relegation	—	2 teams automatically relegation from J1 to J2
2002	28	16	Sanfrecce Hiroshima; Consadole Sapporo	Oita Trinita; Cerezo Osaka	12	No Relegation	—	2 teams automatically relegation from J1 to J2
2003	28	16	Vegalta Sendai; Kyoto Purple Sanga	Albirex Niigata; Sanfrecce Hiroshima	12	No Relegation	—	2 teams automatically relegation from J1 to J2
2004	28	16	None	Kawasaki Frontale; Omiya Ardija	12	No Relegation	Tokushima Vortis; Thespa Kusatsu	J1-J2 Entry Playoffs to be introduced
2005	30	18	Kashiwa Reysol†; Tokyo Verdy; Vissel Kobe	Kyoto Purple Sanga; Avispa Fukuoka; Ventforet Kofu†	12	No Relegation	Ehime FC	Automatic replacement 2 clubs to J2 + J1/J2 playoff match
2006	31	18	Avispa Fukuoka†; Cerezo Osaka; Kyoto Purple Sanga	Yokohama FC; Kashiwa Reysol; Vissel Kobe†	13	No Relegation	—	Automatic replacement 2 clubs to J2 + J1/J2 playoff match
2007	31	18	Sanfrecce Hiroshima†; Ventforet Kofu; Yokohama FC	Consadole Sapporo; Tokyo Verdy; Kyoto Purple Sanga†	13	No Relegation	Roasso Kumamoto; FC Gifu	Automatic replacement 2 clubs to J2 + J1/J2 playoff match
2008	33	18	Tokyo Verdy; Consadole Sapporo	Sanfrecce Hiroshima; Montedio Yamagata	15	No Relegation	Tochigi SC; Kataller Toyama; Fagiano Okayama	Automatic replacement 2 clubs to J2 + J1/J2 playoff match
2009	36	18	Kashiwa Reysol; Oita Trinita; JEF United Chiba	Vegalta Sendai; Cerezo Osaka; Shonan Bellmare	18	No Relegation	Giravanz Kitakyushu	Automatic replacement 3 clubs to J2
2010	37	18	FC Tokyo; Kyoto Sanga; Shonan Bellmare	Kashiwa Reysol; Ventforet Kofu; Avispa Fukuoka	19	No Relegation	Gainare Tottori	Automatic replacement 3 clubs to J2
2011	38	18	Ventforet Kofu; Avispa Fukuoka; Montedio Yamagata	FC Tokyo; Sagan Tosu; Consadole Sapporo	20	No Relegation	FC Machida Zelvia; Matsumoto Yamaga FC	Automatic replacement 3 clubs to J2
2012	40	18	Vissel Kobe; Gamba Osaka; Consadole Sapporo	Ventforet Kofu; Shonan Bellmare; Oita Trinita	22	FC Machida Zelvia	V-Varen Nagasaki	J1 promotion playoff start from 2013

Year	Teams	J1		J2			J3			JFL	Remarks
Year	Teams	Number	J2 Relegation	J1 Promotion	Number	J3 Relegation	J2 Promotion	Number	JFL Relegation	J League Entry	Remarks
2013	40	18	Shonan Bellmare; Júbilo Iwata; Oita Trinita	Gamba Osaka; Vissel Kobe; Tokushima Vortis	22	Gainare Tottori	—			Kamatamare Sanuki; 10 clubs from New JFL (Note: 9 clubs from the New JFL: Blaublitz Akita, Fukushima United FC, FC Machida Zelvia, SC Sagamihara, YSCC Yokohama, AC Nagano Parceiro, Zweigen Kanazawa, Fujieda MYFC, FC Ryukyu and one club from the Japanese Regional Leagues, Iwate Grulla Morioka (part of Tohoku Soccer League).)	Sanuki is the result of the J2-JFL exchange match 10 clubs enter J3 from JFL, that club automatically promotion from JFL to J2 from 2014
2014	51	18	Omiya Ardija; Cerezo Osaka; Tokushima Vortis	Shonan Bellmare; Matsumoto Yamaga FC; Montedio Yamagata	22	Kataller Toyama	Zweigen Kanazawa	12	No Relegation	Renofa Yamaguchi FC	Introduction of J2-J3 replacement games
2015	52	18	Matsumoto Yamaga FC; Shimizu S-Pulse; Montedio Yamagata	Omiya Ardija; Júbilo Iwata; Avispa Fukuoka	22	Oita Trinita†; Tochigi SC	Renofa Yamaguchi FC; FC Machida Zelvia†	13	No Relegation	Kagoshima United FC	None
2016	53	18	Nagoya Grampus Eight; Shonan Bellmare; Avispa Fukuoka	Hokkaido Consadole Sapporo; Shimizu S-Pulse; Cerezo Osaka	22	Giravanz Kitakyushu	Oita Trinita	16	No Relegation	Azul Claro Numazu	None
2017	54	18	Ventforet Kofu; Albirex Niigata; Omiya Ardija	Shonan Bellmare; V-Varen Nagasaki; Nagoya Grampus Eight	22	Thespakusatsu Gunma	Tochigi SC	17	No Relegation	—	J2-J3 replacement games has been abolished in 2017
2018	54	18	Kashiwa Reysol; V-Varen Nagasaki	Matsumoto Yamaga FC; Oita Trinita	22	Roasso Kumamoto; Kamatamare Sanuki	FC Ryukyu; Kagoshima United FC	17	No Relegation	Vanraure Hachinohe	J1 entry playoff start for 2018
2019	55	18	Matsumoto Yamaga FC; Júbilo Iwata	Kashiwa Reysol; Yokohama FC	22	Kagoshima United FC; FC Gifu	Giravanz Kitakyushu; Thespakusatsu Gunma	18	No Relegation	FC Imabari	None
2020	56	18	—	Tokushima Vortis; Avispa Fukuoka	22	—	Blaublitz Akita; SC Sagamihara	18	No Relegation	Tegevajaro Miyazaki	No relegation and J1 entry playoffs from 2020 and 2021 due to COVID-19 pandemic.
2021	57	20	Tokushima Vortis; Oita Trinita; Vegalta Sendai; Yokohama FC	Júbilo Iwata; Kyoto Sanga	22	SC Sagamihara; Ehime FC; Giravanz Kitakyushu; Matsumoto Yamaga FC	Roasso Kumamoto; Iwate Grulla Morioka	15	No Relegation	Iwaki FC	No J1 entry playoffs for 2021
2022	58	18	Shimizu S-Pulse; Júbilo Iwata	Albirex Niigata; Yokohama FC	22	FC Ryukyu; Iwate Grulla Morioka	Iwaki FC; Fujieda MYFC	18	No Relegation	Nara Club; FC Osaka	None
2023	60	18	Yokohama FC	FC Machida Zelvia; Júbilo Iwata; Tokyo Verdy	22	Omiya Ardija; Zweigen Kanazawa	Ehime FC; Kagoshima United FC	20	—		J1 promotion playoff return for 2023 onwards
2024	60	20	Júbilo Iwata; Hokkaido Consadole Sapporo; Sagan Tosu	Shimizu S-Pulse; Yokohama FC; Fagiano Okayama	20	Tochigi SC; Kagoshima United FC; Thespa Gunma	Omiya Ardija; FC Imabari; Kataller Toyama	20	YSCC Yokohama†; Iwate Grulla Morioka	Tochigi City FC; Kochi United SC†	J2 promotion playoff introduced from 2024 onwards
2025	60	20	Yokohama FC; Shonan Bellmare; Albirex Niigata	Mito HollyHock; V-Varen Nagasaki; JEF United Chiba	20	Roasso Kumamoto; Renofa Yamaguchi FC; Ehime FC	Tochigi City FC; Vanraure Hachinohe; Tegevajaro Miyazaki	20	Azul Claro Numazu†	Reilac Shiga FC†	
2026–27	60	20			20			20			

- Those with "†" are promotions and promotions based on the result of the shunting match. Remaining in the shunting and entry playoffs is not reflected.
- The number of J3 teams includes the number of 2014 and 2015 J.League Under 22 teams and the number of U-23 teams from 2016 to 2020.

=== About the future ===
The J.League has announced a policy of setting a maximum of 20 teams for the J3 League and 60 teams for the total number of regular member teams including J1 and J2. According to interviews with people involved in the J.League, it has become clear that J1, J2 and J3 are proposing to have 20 teams each from 2024 at the earliest.

In conjunction with the increase in the number of teams, this is a new growth strategy that revises the ratio of equal distribution money and in particular, the policy of grading allocation centered on the top clubs of J1. It is said that the aim is to improve the value of the J. League by increasing the provision of high quality matches. If there are 20 teams in each class, in 2023, only the lowest (18th) club will be demoted from J1 to J2 and conversely, 3 clubs will be promoted from J2 to J1. It is said that there is.

After that, on 20 December 2022, based on the J League's two new growth strategies ("60 clubs shine in their respective regions" and "top tier shines as national (global) content"), From the 2024 season, J1, J2 and J3 will have 20 teams each and J. League cup games will officially be renewed to a knockout (tournament) format in which all 60 clubs from J1, J2 and J3 will participate was announced in.

== Branding ==
The first official J.League Anthem - "J'S THEME" debuted in 1993 and was composed by Michiya Haruhata. It was used during league broadcasts and as a prelude to kickoff at stadiums.

J.League and J.League clubs make the most out of their logos / emblems and mascots for branding and marketing.

In 2026, the J.League announced a partnership with The Pokémon Company to assign all 60 J.League clubs a Pokémon mascot. The mascots will be used starting with the 2026-27 seasons. The partnership also features giveaways of Pokémon "Evolution!" themed eco-bags to game attendees featuring Pikachu and the team's mascot Pokémon.

== Awards ==
- Manager of the Year Award
- Most Valuable Player Award
- Top Scorer Award
- Rookie of the Year Award
- Best XI Award

== See also ==
- Japan Football Association (JFA)

League

- Japanese association football league system
  - J.League
    - J1 League
    - J2 League
    - J3 League
  - Japan Football League
  - Japanese Regional Leagues

Cup

- Fujifilm Super Cup
- Emperor's Cup
- J.League YBC Levain Cup

== See also ==
- Japan Soccer League
