= Baron (name) =

The following is a list of people with the name Baron or Barron. "Baron" is a title of nobility, and in old English referred to a wealthy male landowner. In Hebrew, the Israeli surname "Bar-On" ("בר-און") is usually contracted to Baron; it means "son of strength/vigor/potency".

== Surname ==
- Ana Baron (1950–2015), Argentine journalist
- Bengt Baron (born 1962), Swedish swimmer
- David Baron (disambiguation)
- Eguinaire Baron (1495–1550), French jurist
- Ernie Baron (1940–2006), Filipino broadcaster and inventor
- Fanya Baron (died 1921), Russian anarchist revolutionary
- Fred Baron (lawyer) (1947–2008), American trial lawyer
- Fred Baron (producer) (born 1954), American film producer
- Gustav Baron (1847–1914), Croatian theologian
- Hermine Baron (1912–1996), American bridge player
- Hyacinthe Théodore Baron (1707–1787), French military physician
- Jacques Baron (1905–1986), French surrealist poet
- Joey Baron (born 1955), American jazz drummer
- Krišjānis Barons (1835–1923), Latvian writer and "father of the dainas"
- Leo Baron, British lawyer, contract bridge player, and judge in Zambia and Zimbabwe
- Lynda Baron (1939–2022), English actress
- Marcelo Baron Polanczyk (born 1974), Brazilian footballer
- Margaret Baron (1915–1996), British mathematics educator and historian of mathematics
- Martin Baron (born 1954), American journalist and editor
- Mary Joy Baron (born 1995), Filipino volleyball player
- Michel Baron (1653–1729), French actor and playwright
- Mike Baron, American comic book writer
- Murray Baron (born 1967), Canadian ice hockey player
- Naomi Baron American linguist and professor
- Odile Baron Supervielle (1915–2016), Uruguayan-born Argentine writer, journalist
- Piers Baron (musician)
- Robert Baron (poet) (1630–?), English writer and plagiarist
- Robert Baron (theologian) (1596–1639), Scottish theologian
- Robert A. Baron, American business professor
- Ronald S. Baron (born 1943), American money manager
- Roni Bar-On (born 1948), Israeli politician
- Sacha Baron Cohen (born 1971), British actor and writer
- Salo Wittmayer Baron (1895–1989), Polish-Austrian Jewish historian
- Sandy Baron (1937–2001), American comic actor
- Simon Baron-Cohen (born 1958), British psychotherapy professor
- Théodore Baron (1840–1899), Belgian landscape painter

== Given name ==
- Baron Browne (1955–2021), American jazz musician
- Baron Browning (born 1999), American football player
- Baron Corbin (Thomas Pestock) (born 1984), American professional wrestler
- Baron Davis (born 1979), American basketball player
- Baron Dickinson Webster (1818–1860), British businessman
- Baron Geisler (born 1982), Filipino actor
- Baron Barrymore Halpenny, English artist, writer, and historian
- Barron Hilton (1927–2019), hotel tycoon
- Andy Murray, (Andy Barron Murray, born 1987), Scottish tennis player
- Barron Trump (born 2006), son of Donald and Melania Trump
- Baron Vaughn, American comedian
- Baron Waqa (born 1959), former President of Nauru
- Barron Wortham (born 1969), American football player

== Nickname or stage name ==
- Baron (Trinidadian musician) (born 1948), Trinidadian singer/songwriter
- Baron (photographer), British society photographer prominent in the 1940s and 1950s

== Fictional characters ==
- Baron Trump (character)
- Baron Vengeous, a fictional character in the Skulduggery Pleasant novel series
- Baron Wallis / Mother's Milk (M.M.), a fictional character in The Boys comic series

== See also ==
- Barron (disambiguation)
