= Kim Myung-hwi =

Zainichi Korean footballer (born 1981)

Kim Myung-hwi 金明輝
Personal information
- Full name: Kim Myung-hwi
- Date of birth: 8 May 1981 (age 45)
- Place of birth: Hyogo, Japan
- Height: 1.86 m (6 ft 1 in)
- Position: Defender

Senior career*
| Years | Team | Apps | (Gls) |
| 2000–2001 | JEF United Ichihara | 0 | (0) |
| 2000 | → Ventforet Kofu (loan) | 5 | (0) |
| 2002 | Seongnam Ilhwa Chunma | 0 | (0) |
| 2003–2006 | Sagawa Express Osaka | 52 | (3) |
| 2006 | Banditonce Kobe | 0 | (0) |
| 2007–2010 | Kataller Toyama | 71 | (6) |
| 2011 | Sagan Tosu | 0 | (0) |

Managerial career
- 2018: Sagan Tosu
- 2019–2021: Sagan Tosu
- 2025–2026: Avispa Fukuoka
- * Club domestic league appearances and goals

Kim Myung-hwi (born 8 May 1981) is a Zainichi Korean football manager and former player who is a manager.

== Club statistics ==
| Club performance | | | League | | Cup | | League Cup | | Total | |
| Season | Club | League | Apps | Goals | Apps | Goals | Apps | Goals | Apps | Goals |
| Japan | | | League | | Emperor's Cup | | J.League Cup | | Total | |
|---|---|---|---|---|---|---|---|---|---|---|
| 2000 | JEF United Ichihara | J1 League | 0 | 0 | 0 | 0 | 2 | 0 | 2 | 0 |
| 2000 | Ventforet Kofu | J2 League | 5 | 0 | 0 | 0 | 0 | 0 | 5 | 0 |
| 2001 | JEF United Ichihara | J1 League | 0 | 0 | 1 | 0 | 0 | 0 | 1 | 0 |
| Korea Republic | | | League | | FA Cup | | K-League Cup | | Total | |
| 2002 | Seongnam Ilhwa Chunma | K-League | 0 | 0 | 0 | 0 | 0 | 0 | 0 | 0 |
| Japan | | | League | | Emperor's Cup | | J.League Cup | | Total | |
| 2003 | Sagawa Express Osaka | JFL | 1 | 0 | - | | - | | 1 | 0 |
| 2004 | Sagawa Express Osaka | JFL | 6 | 1 | - | | - | | 6 | 1 |
| 2005 | Sagawa Express Osaka | JFL | 25 | 1 | - | | - | | 25 | 1 |
| 2006 | Sagawa Express Osaka | JFL | 20 | 1 | - | | - | | 20 | 1 |
| 2006 | Banditonce Kobe | JRL (Kansai) | 0 | 0 | 0 | 0 | - | | 0 | 0 |
| 2007 | ALO'S Hokuriku | JFL | 25 | 3 | 2 | 1 | - | | 27 | 4 |
| 2008 | Kataller Toyama | JFL | 14 | 2 | 1 | 0 | - | | 15 | 2 |
| 2009 | Kataller Toyama | J2 League | 15 | 1 | 1 | 0 | - | | 16 | 1 |
| 2010 | Kataller Toyama | J2 League | 17 | 0 | 0 | 0 | - | | 17 | 0 |
| 2011 | Sagan Tosu | J2 League | 0 | 0 | 1 | 0 | - | | 1 | 0 |
| Country | Japan | | 128 | 9 | 9 | 1 | 2 | 0 | 139 | 10 |
| Country | Korea Republic | | 0 | 0 | 0 | 0 | 0 | 0 | 0 | 0 |
| Total | | | 128 | 9 | 9 | 1 | 2 | 0 | 139 | 10 |

== Managerial statistics ==
Update; end of 2025 season

| Team | From | To | Record | | | | |
| Team | From | To | G | W | D | L | Win % |
|---|---|---|---|---|---|---|---|
| Sagan Tosu | 19 October 2018 | 31 December 2018 | 6 | 3 | 2 | 1 | 50.00 |
| Sagan Tosu | 4 May 2019 | 31 January 2022 | 111 | 35 | 32 | 44 | 31.53 |
| Avispa Fukuoka | 1 February 2025 | 5 January 2026 | 46 | 18 | 12 | 16 | 39.13 |
| Total | | | 163 | 56 | 46 | 61 | 34.36 |
