= Bar-On =

Bar-On (Hebrew: בַּר-אוֹן) is a Hebrew surname meaning "son of strength" derived from the Aramaic בר 'bar', meaning "son", and the Hebrew און 'on', meaning "strength" or "power". Notable people with the name include:

- Adina Bar-On (born 1951), Israeli artist
- Aviva Bar-On (born 1932), Czech-Israeli Holocaust survivor
- Dan Bar-On (1938–2008), Israeli psychologist
- Dorit Bar-On (born 1955), American philosopher
- Israel Bar-On (born 1989), Israeli singer
- Mordechai Bar-On (1928–2021), Israeli politician
- Orit Bar-On (born 1975), Israeli judoka
- Reuven Bar-On (born 1944), American psychologist
- Roni Bar-On (born 1948), Israeli politician and lawyer

== See also ==
- Baron (name)
