= Baron (footballer) =

Brazilian footballer (born 1974)

Personal information
- Full name: Marcelo Baron Polanczyk
- Date of birth: 19 January 1974 (age 52)
- Place of birth: Rio Grande do Sul, Brazil
- Height: 1.86 m (6 ft 1 in)
- Position: Forward

Senior career*
Years	Team	Apps	(Gls)
1990–1993	Internacional		
1994	Chapecoense		
1995	Santa Cruz		
1996	Ventforet Kofu		
1997	Sampaio Corrêa Futebol Clube		
1998	Ventforet Kofu		
1999–2000	JEF United Ichihara		
2001–2002	Shimizu S-Pulse		
2003	Cerezo Osaka		
2004	Ventforet Kofu		
2004	Kashima Antlers		
2005	Vegalta Sendai		
2006	Vissel Kobe		
2006	Avispa Fukuoka		
2007	América-SP		
- * Club domestic league appearances and goals

Marcelo Baron Polanczyk (born 19 January 1974), known as just Baron (Japanese: バロン), is a Brazilian former professional footballer who played as a forward. In the 2001–2002 season, he was part of the Shimizu S-Pulse team that won both the Emperor's Cup and the Xerox Cup. He has a bachelor's degree in physical education from Unijuí.

== Career statistics ==
Appearances and goals by club, season and competition
Club	Season	League			National cup (Note: Includes Emperor's Cup.)		League cup (Note: Includes J.League Cup.)		Continental		Total	
Club	Season	Division	Apps	Goals	Apps	Goals	Apps	Goals	Apps	Goals	Apps	Goals
Ventforet Kofu	1996	JFL	26	13	1	2	–		–		27	15
Ventforet Kofu	1998	JFL	29	31	4	10	–		–		33	41
JEF United Ichihara	1999	J1 League	28	17	1	0	1	0	–		30	17
JEF United Ichihara	2000	J1 League	30	13	2	0	3	1	–		35	14
Shimizu S-Pulse	2001	J1 League	28	15	5	5	2	0	–		35	20
Shimizu S-Pulse	2002	J1 League	28	6	3	3	7	2	3	5	41	16
Cerezo Osaka	2003	J1 League	26	9	5	4	4	1	–		35	14
Ventforet Kofu	2004	J2 League	23	14	0	0	–		–		23	14
Kashima Antlers	2004	J1 League	12	2	0	0	1	0	–		13	2
Vegalta Sendai	2005	J2 League	35	14	1	1	–		–		36	15
Vissel Kobe	2006	J2 League	10	0	0	0	–		–		10	0
Avispa Fukuoka	2006	J1 League	13	0	1	0	–		–		14	0
Career total			288	134	23	25	18	4	3	5	332	168

== Honors ==
Sampaio Corrêa Futebol Clube

- Campeonato Brasileiro Série C: 1997
- Campeonato Maranhense: 1997

Shimizu S-Pulse

- Emperor's Cup: 2001
- Japanese Super Cup: 2001, 2002

Individual

- Campeonato Brasileiro Série C top goalscorer: 1997
