= David Barron =

David Barron may refer to:

- David Barron (film producer) (born 1954), British film producer
- David Barron (footballer) (born 1987), Scottish footballer
- David J. Barron (born 1967), federal judge on the United States Court of Appeals for the First Circuit
- David W. Barron (1935–2012), British computer scientist
- David Barron (actor), American actor in the 1989 Broadway revival of Sweeney Todd
- David Barron (Highland games), American competitor at Highland games, including the Highlander Challenge World Championships
- David Barron Corona (1963–1997), Mexican drug trafficker

== See also ==
- David Baron (disambiguation)
