= Đuro Pilar =

Croatian geologist, palaeontologist, professor and rector

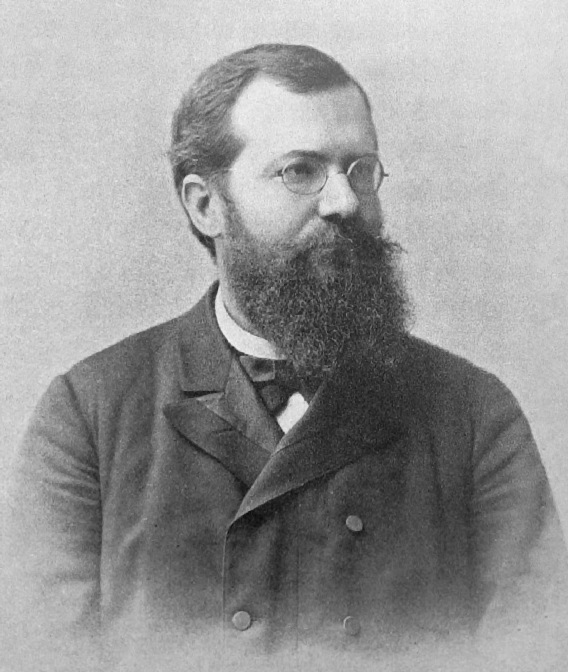
Đuro Pilar

Đuro Pilar (April 22, 1846 in Brod na Savi – May 19, 1893 in Zagreb) was a Croatian geologist, palaeontologist, and professor and rector at the University of Zagreb.

== Biography ==
Pilar had, with his mother (Tereza Čulić of Derventa), a strong family relationship to Bosnia.

His formal training was extensive. The first training he received was at Zagreb and Osijek. Later, he studied at the Université libre de Bruxelles (from 1865, Natural Sciences), the Sorbonne (from 1869), and the École de Chimie (1869, chemistry) in Paris. He received his Ph.D. in 1868 and acquired a title of docent.

Since 1875 he worked as a regular professor at the Faculty of Philosophy (up until 1928 called Mudroslovni fakultet). He was the director of the Mineralogical-geological Department of the People's Museum in Zagreb. He became a full member of the Yugoslav Academy of Sciences and Arts in 1875.

Professor Pilar was the first rector of the University of Zagreb with background in natural science, and also the first Croat to be the professor at the Department for Mathematics. He served as a dean in two mandates, as a rector of the university in the academic year 1884/1885, and as a prorector the following year. In 1874 he founded with his associates Croatian Climbing Society, and in 1885 Croatian Association for Natural Science.

As a versatile geologist, Pilar studied waters and set the foundations of karst hydrology. In his research he investigated earthquakes, speleological objects, and coal findings. As a skilled amateur chess player, he was one of the organizers of the Zagreb chess events, being a winner of the first chess tournament held in Zagreb in 1886. A street in Zagreb and an elementary school in Slavonski Brod are named after him.

== Publications ==
- Uporaba ruda i kovova za prvih kulturnih pojava čovjeka I, II and III (1879–1880)
- Osnovi abisodinamike (1880)
- Geološka opažanja u zapadnoj Bosni. Istraživanja god. 1879. (Rad JAZU, 16. book; 1882)
- Pilar, Giorgio (1883). Flora fossilis Susedana (Susudska Fosilna Flora - Flore Fossile de Sused). Zagrabiae: apud Leopoldum Hartman Bibliopolam Academiae Slav. Merid. – via Google Books.

Academic offices
Preceded by Blaž Lorković	Rector of the University of Zagreb; 1884–1885	Succeeded by Gustav Baron
