= Baron (Trinidadian musician) =

Timothy Watkins
- Born: Timothy Watkins; March 14, 1947 (age 79); Bamboo Village in La Romaine, Trinidad
- Genres: Soca, Calypso
- Occupations: Singer; songwriter
- Instrument: Vocals
- Years active: 1971–present

Timothy Watkins, better known by his stage name Baron, is a Trinidadian singer and songwriter. He is known for many soca/calypso songs from the 80s, such as "Sweet Soca Man", "Doh Rock It So" and "Melosian Rhapsody" as well as the 2009 hit "Spanish Woman".

== Music career ==
=== 1971–1980: Career beginnings ===
In 1971, Baron began making calypsoes.

He released the album Breakdown Time in 1979, as his debut.

=== 1984–1989: Instant Joy, Sweeter Than Ever, Full of Fire and Melosian Rhapsody ===
Baron released four albums in this space of time. Singles like "Doh Rock It So", "Buss Up Shut", "Raja Rani", "Soca Espanol" and "Melosian Rhapsody" were soca hits.

=== 1990–1994: On Top of the World and Soca Uprising ===
He released the albums On Top of the World and Soca Uprising.

In 1990, the song "Sweet Soca Man" was released, and was a hit.

=== 1994–1998: Ballads With a Caribbean Flavor ===
In 1995, Baron released his album Ballads with a Caribbean Flavor, one of his longest albums to be released and was a success. The album had a somewhat 'Lovers Rock' feel to it, with its usual soca calypso influences that Baron uses.

=== 1999–2001: The Very Best of Baron ===
In 1999, Baron released a compilation album The Very Best of Baron.

=== 2001–2009: Two Thousand and One ===
Baron released his album Two Thousand and One.

=== 2009–2016: Christmas with Baron ===
The Christmas album released by Baron in 2009 is one of his most successful albums. The album spawned the hit "Spanish Woman" and helped the artist make a comeback.

=== 2016–present: "Granny Could Wine" ===
In 2016, Baron featured on a track with Granny, a comedian, for her song "Granny Could Wine".
