= 2005 in Japanese football =

2005 season

Japanese football in 2005

== National team (Men) ==
=== Results ===
2005.01.29	Japan	4–0	Kazakhstan	Kanagawa, Japan
	Tamada 5', 60'; Matsuda 11'; Santos 24'	JFA		Stadium: International Stadium Yokohama; Attendance: 46,941

2005.02.02	Japan	3–0	Syria	Saitama, Japan
	Suzuki 44'; Miyamoto 69'; Ogasawara 90'	JFA		Stadium: Saitama Stadium 2002; Attendance: 32,832

2005.02.09	Japan	2–1	North Korea	Saitama, Japan
	Ogasawara 4'; Oguro 90'	JFA	? (?)	Stadium: Saitama Stadium 2002; Attendance: 59,399

2005.03.25	Japan	1–2	Iran	Tehrān, Iran
	Fukunishi 66'	JFA	? (?) ? (?)	Attendance: 110,000

2005.03.30	Japan	1–0	Bahrain	Saitama, Japan
	71' (o.g.)	JFA		Stadium: Saitama Stadium 2002; Attendance: 61,549

2005.05.22	Japan	0–1	Peru	Niigata, Japan
		JFA	? (?)	Stadium: Niigata Stadium; Attendance: 39,856

2005.05.27	Japan	0–1	United Arab Emirates	Tokyo, Japan
		JFA	? (?)	Stadium: Tokyo National Stadium; Attendance: 53,123

2005.06.03	Japan	1–0	Bahrain	Manama, Bahrain
	Ogasawara 34'	JFA		Attendance: 32,000

2005.06.08	Japan	2–0	South Korea	Bangkok, Thailand
	Yanagisawa 67'; Oguro 89'	JFA		Attendance: 0

2005.06.16	Japan	1–2	Mexico	Hanover, Germany
	Yanagisawa 12'	JFA	? (?) ? (?)	Attendance: 24,036

2005.06.19	Japan	1–0	Greece	Frankfurt, Germany
	Oguro 76'	JFA		Attendance: 34,314

2005.06.22	Japan	2–2	Brazil	Köln, Germany
	Nakamura 27'; Oguro 88'	JFA	? (?) ? (?)	Attendance: 44,922

2005.07.31	Japan	0–1	North Korea	Daejeon, South Korea
		JFA	? (?)	Attendance: 23,150

2005.08.03	Japan	2–2	China PR	Daejeon, South Korea
	Moniwa 59'; T. Tanaka 87'	JFA	? (?) ? (?)	Attendance: 1,827

2005.08.07	Japan	1–0	South Korea	Daegu, South Korea
	Nakazawa 86'	JFA		Attendance: 42,753

2005.08.17	Japan	2–1	Iran	Kanagawa, Japan
	Kaji 28'; Oguro 76'	JFA	? (?)	Stadium: International Stadium Yokohama; Attendance: 66,098

2005.09.07	Japan	5–4	Honduras	Miyagi, Japan
	Takahara 33'; Yanagisawa 48', 70'; Nakamura 55'; Ogasawara 78'	JFA	? (?) ? (?) ? (?) ? (?)	Stadium: Miyagi Stadium; Attendance: 45,198

2005.10.08	Japan	2–2	Latvia	Rīga, Latvia
	Takahara 5'; Nakamura 52'	JFA	? (?) ? (?)

2005.10.12	Japan	0–1	Ukraine	Kyiv, Ukraine
		JFA	? (?)

2005.11.16	Japan	1–0	Angola	Tokyo, Japan
	Matsui 90'	JFA		Stadium: Tokyo National Stadium; Attendance: 52,406

=== Players statistics ===
Player	-2004	01.29	02.02	02.09	03.25	03.30	05.22	05.27	06.03	06.08	06.16	06.19	06.22	07.31	08.03	08.07	08.17	09.07	10.08	10.12	11.16	2005	Total
Yoshikatsu Kawaguchi	65(0)	O	O	O	-	-	O	O	O	O	O	O	O	O	-	-	O	-	-	O	O	14(0)	79(0)
Hidetoshi Nakata	61(10)	-	-	-	O	O	-	-	O	-	O	O	O	-	-	-	-	O	O	O	O	10(0)	71(10)
Junichi Inamoto	51(4)	-	-	-	-	O	O	O	O	O	O	-	-	-	-	-	-	O	O	O	O	10(0)	61(4)
Shunsuke Nakamura	46(12)	-	-	O	O	O	-	-	O	-	O	O	O(1)	-	-	-	-	O(1)	O(1)	O	O	11(3)	57(15)
Alessandro Santos	46(4)	O(1)	O	O	-	O	O	O	O	-	O	O	O	O	O	-	O	O	O	O	O	17(1)	63(5)
Kōji Nakata	46(2)	-	O	-	-	-	-	-	O	O	-	O	O	-	-	-	-	O	O	O	-	8(0)	54(2)
Seigo Narazaki	46(0)	-	-	-	O	O	-	-	-	-	-	-	-	-	O	-	-	O	-	-	-	4(0)	50(0)
Takayuki Suzuki	45(10)	O	O(1)	O	-	O	O	O	-	O	-	-	O	-	-	-	-	-	O	O	-	10(1)	55(11)
Tsuneyasu Miyamoto	45(2)	-	O(1)	O	O	O	O	O	O	O	O	O	O	O	-	-	O	O	-	-	O	15(1)	60(3)
Atsushi Yanagisawa	44(13)	-	-	-	O	-	-	-	O	O(1)	O(1)	O	O	-	-	-	-	O(2)	O	O	O	10(4)	54(17)
Shinji Ono	44(5)	-	-	-	O	-	-	O	-	-	-	-	-	-	-	-	-	-	-	-	-	2(0)	46(5)
Takashi Fukunishi	39(5)	O	O	O	O(1)	O	O	O	O	O	O	O	O	O	-	-	O	-	-	-	-	14(1)	53(6)
Naoki Matsuda	39(0)	O(1)	-	-	-	-	-	-	-	-	-	-	-	-	-	-	-	-	-	-	-	1(1)	40(1)
Naohiro Takahara	32(12)	-	-	O	O	O	-	-	-	-	-	-	-	-	-	-	-	O(1)	O(1)	O	O	7(2)	39(14)
Yuji Nakazawa	29(7)	O	O	O	O	O	-	-	O	O	-	-	-	O	-	O(1)	O	O	-	-	O	12(1)	41(8)
Yasuhito Endō	28(3)	O	O	O	-	-	O	-	-	O	-	O	-	O	-	-	O	-	-	-	-	8(0)	36(3)
Mitsuo Ogasawara	28(2)	O	O(1)	O(1)	O	-	O	O	O(1)	O	O	O	O	O	-	O	O	O(1)	-	-	-	15(4)	43(6)
Toshiya Fujita	23(3)	O	-	-	-	-	-	-	-	-	-	-	-	-	-	-	-	-	-	-	-	1(0)	24(3)
Atsuhiro Miura	23(1)	-	-	-	O	-	O	-	-	-	-	-	-	-	-	-	-	-	-	-	-	2(0)	25(1)
Akira Kaji	21(0)	O	O	O	O	O	-	O	O	O	O	O	O	O	-	-	O(1)	O	-	-	-	14(1)	35(1)
Keisuke Tsuboi	21(0)	O	-	-	-	-	O	O	-	-	-	-	-	-	O	O	-	-	O	O	-	7(0)	28(0)
Keiji Tamada	18(5)	O(2)	O	O	O	O	O	O	O	-	O	O	O	O	O	O	O	O	-	-	-	16(2)	34(7)
Masashi Motoyama	18(0)	O	O	-	-	-	O	O	-	-	-	-	-	O	O	O	-	-	O	-	-	8(0)	26(0)
Yoshito Ōkubo	17(0)	-	-	-	-	-	-	-	-	-	-	-	-	-	-	-	-	-	O	O	-	2(0)	19(0)
Makoto Tanaka	14(0)	O	O	O	-	O	O	O	O	O	O	O	O	O	-	-	O	O	O	-	O	16(0)	30(0)
Teruyuki Moniwa	3(0)	-	-	-	-	-	-	-	-	-	-	-	-	-	O(1)	O	-	-	O	O	-	4(1)	7(1)
Takayuki Chano	3(0)	-	-	-	-	-	-	O	-	-	O	-	-	-	O	O	-	-	-	-	-	4(0)	7(0)
Yoichi Doi	2(0)	-	-	-	-	-	-	-	-	-	-	-	-	-	-	O	-	-	O	-	-	2(0)	4(0)
Daisuke Matsui	1(0)	-	-	-	-	-	-	-	-	-	-	-	-	-	-	-	-	-	O	O	O(1)	3(1)	4(1)
Masashi Oguro	0(0)	O	-	O(1)	O	-	O	O	-	O(1)	O	O(1)	O(1)	O	O	O	O(1)	O	-	-	O	15(5)	15(5)
Yuki Abe	0(0)	O	-	-	-	-	-	-	-	-	-	-	-	-	O	O	O	-	-	-	O	5(0)	5(0)
Yūichi Komano	0(0)	-	-	-	-	-	-	-	-	-	-	-	-	-	O	O	-	-	O	O	O	5(0)	5(0)
Seiichiro Maki	0(0)	-	-	-	-	-	-	-	-	-	-	-	-	O	O	O	-	-	-	-	-	3(0)	3(0)
Yasuyuki Konno	0(0)	-	-	-	-	-	-	-	-	-	-	-	-	-	O	O	O	-	-	-	-	3(0)	3(0)
Shinji Murai	0(0)	-	-	-	-	-	-	-	-	-	-	-	-	-	O	O	-	-	-	O	-	3(0)	3(0)
Tatsuya Tanaka	0(0)	-	-	-	-	-	-	-	-	-	-	-	-	O	O(1)	-	-	-	-	-	-	2(1)	2(1)
Yoshinobu Minowa	0(0)	-	-	-	-	-	-	-	-	-	-	-	-	-	-	-	-	-	-	O	-	1(0)	1(0)

== National team (Women) ==
=== Results ===
2005.03.26	Japan	2–0	Australia	Australia
	Ando (?); Yanagita (?)

2005.03.29	Japan	1–2	Australia	Australia
	Miyama (?)		? (?) ? (?)

2005.05.21	Japan	6–0	New Zealand	Tokyo, Japan
	Sawa (?); Nagasato (?); Miyama (?); Sudo (?)			Stadium: Nishigaoka Soccer Stadium

2005.05.26	Japan	4–2	Russia	Russia
	(?); Yanagita (?); Nagasato (?)		? (?) ? (?)

2005.05.28	Japan	2–0	Russia	Russia
	Nagasato (?); Sawa (?)

2005.07.23	Japan	4–2	Australia	Tokyo, Japan
	Nagasato (?); Ono (?); Sakai (?)		? (?) ? (?)	Stadium: Nishigaoka Soccer Stadium

2005.08.01	Japan	0–1	North Korea	South Korea
			? (?)

2005.08.03	Japan	0–0	China	South Korea

2005.08.06	Japan	0–0	South Korea	South Korea

=== Players statistics ===
Player	-2004	03.26	03.29	05.21	05.26	05.28	07.23	08.01	08.03	08.06	2005	Total
Homare Sawa	90(49)	O	O	O(2)	O	O(1)	O	O	O	O	9(3)	99(52)
Nozomi Yamago	71(0)	O	-	-	-	O	-	O	O	O	5(0)	76(0)
Tomoe Sakai	68(2)	O	O	O	O	O	O(1)	O	O	O	9(1)	77(3)
Hiromi Isozaki	65(4)	O	O	O	O	O	O	O	O	O	9(0)	74(4)
Yasuyo Yamagishi	58(6)	-	-	O	-	O	-	-	-	-	2(0)	60(6)
Mio Otani	50(31)	-	-	O	O	O	O	O	O	O	7(0)	57(31)
Naoko Kawakami	44(0)	O	O	O	O	-	-	-	-	-	4(0)	48(0)
Miyuki Yanagita	38(3)	O(1)	O	O	O(2)	O	O	O	O	O	9(3)	47(6)
Karina Maruyama	28(9)	-	-	-	-	-	O	O	-	O	3(0)	31(9)
Ayumi Hara	28(1)	-	O	-	-	-	-	-	-	-	1(0)	29(1)
Kozue Ando	18(3)	O(1)	O	O	O	O	O	O	O	O	9(1)	27(4)
Kyoko Yano	14(1)	-	-	-	O	O	-	O	O	O	5(0)	19(1)
Aya Shimokozuru	10(0)	-	-	-	-	O	O	O	O	O	5(0)	15(0)
Aya Miyama	7(4)	O	O(1)	O(1)	O	O	O	O	O	O	9(2)	16(6)
Shinobu Ono	6(5)	-	-	O	O	O	O(1)	O	O	O	7(1)	13(6)
Nao Shikata	4(0)	O	O	-	-	-	-	-	-	-	2(0)	6(0)
Ayako Kitamoto	2(3)	O	O	O	-	O	-	-	-	-	4(0)	6(3)
Tomoko Suzuki	2(2)	O	-	-	-	-	-	-	-	-	1(0)	3(2)
Akiko Sudo	2(0)	O	O	O(1)	O	O	-	-	-	-	5(1)	7(1)
Miho Fukumoto	2(0)	-	O	O	O	-	O	-	-	-	4(0)	6(0)
Yuki Nagasato	1(0)	O	O	O(2)	O(1)	O(1)	O(2)	O	O	O	9(6)	10(6)
Nayuha Toyoda	1(0)	O	O	-	-	-	O	O	-	-	4(0)	5(0)
Rumi Utsugi	0(0)	-	-	O	O	-	O	-	O	O	5(0)	5(0)
Maiko Nakaoka	0(0)	-	-	O	O	O	-	-	-	-	3(0)	3(0)
Saiko Takahashi	0(0)	-	O	O	-	-	-	-	-	-	2(0)	2(0)
Yukari Kinga	0(0)	-	O	-	-	-	-	-	-	-	1(0)	1(0)
Natsumi Hara	0(0)	-	O	-	-	-	-	-	-	-	1(0)	1(0)

== Births ==
- 26 March: Kento Shiogai
