= Gustav Baron =

Croatian theologian, university professor and rector

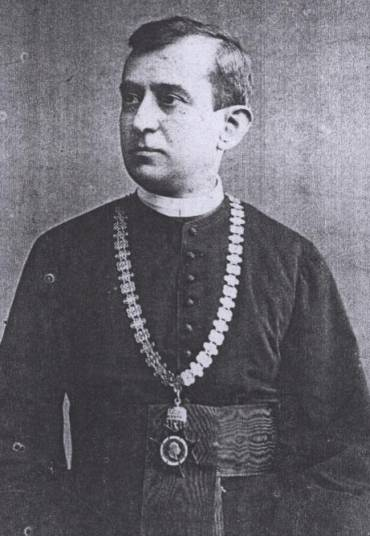
Gustav Baron

Gustav Baron (October 16, 1847 in Kutina – March 18, 1914 in Zagreb) was a Croatian theologian, university professor and rector of the University of Zagreb.

He studied theology in Vienna and Zagreb. He was ordained for a priest in 1873. He received his Ph.D. in 1876 at the Faculty of Theology of the Royal University of Franz Joseph I. He was professor and chair of the Archiepiscopal Gymnasium in Zagreb. He became a docent at the Faculty of Theology in 1877, and a full professor in 1881. He served as the dean of the faculty in two mandates.

Baron was selected as a rector of the University of Zagreb in the academic year 1885/1886. The topic of his inaugural speech was the Bible. After his rectorship mandate expired, he served as a prorector for a year. In 1887 he was appointed as papal agent. He was the canon and the rector of the Theological Seminary in Zagreb in the period 1897-1907, and a general vicar from 1912 until his death. He was one of the founders of the Croatian Catholic movement and a reviver of church singing tradition.

Academic offices
Preceded by Đuro Pilar	Rector of the University of Zagreb; 1885 – 1886	Succeeded by Franjo Vrbanić
