= Margaret Baron =

British mathematics educator and historian of mathematics

Margaret E. Baron (1915 – 16 August 1996) was a British mathematics educator and historian of mathematics known for her book on the history of calculus.

== Life ==
Baron was originally from Gateshead, in north-eastern England, and earned a bachelor's degree from Durham University through King's College, Newcastle, which later became Newcastle University. Baron worked for a year as an English teacher in Frankfurt, and in 1938 became a mathematics teacher at the Bede School for Girls, later to become part of Sunderland College. Because she married George Baron, a teacher at the corresponding boys' school, she was dismissed as a teacher in 1940. She took two more teaching posts, at the Royal Grammar School, Newcastle upon Tyne and the High Storrs School in Sheffield, before leaving work to raise her family in Gateshead.

Her husband returned from war service in 1946, and they moved to London. Eventually she returned to teaching, at Goldsmiths' College and then, in 1957, as head of mathematics at the Stockwell College of Education. While there, she wrote a master's thesis on the history of calculus in 1960, and completed a PhD in 1965. She retired in 1977, and died on 16 August 1996.

== Contributions ==
Baron's book The Origins of the Infinitesimal Calculus, originally published in 1969 by Pergamon, was reprinted in 1987 by Dover Books, and has been suggested for inclusion in undergraduate mathematics libraries by the Mathematical Association of America. She also wrote several other publications in the history of mathematics, including contributions to the Dictionary of Scientific Biography.

She became one of the founders of the Association of Teachers of Mathematics in the early 1950s, and wrote additional publications in mathematics education, including the book Number in Elementary Mathematics (Hutchinson, 1973).
