= David Baron =

David Baron may refer to:

- David Baron (actor) (1933–2020s), English actor
- David Baron (author), American author of the 2017 book American Eclipse
- David Baron (comics), American comic book colorist
- David Baron (composer), American composer and musician
- David Baron (computer scientist), American computer scientist and Mozilla Distinguished Engineer
- David Baron (fighter) (born 1973), French mixed martial artist
- David Baron (Messianic leader) (1855–1926), Jewish convert to Christianity
- Harold Pinter (1930–2008), English playwright, and actor under the stage name David Baron

== See also ==
- David Barron
- David Barons (1936–2018), British racehorse trainer
