= Dorit Bar-On =

American philosopher (born 1955)

Dorit Bar-On (Hebrew: דורית בר-און; born 1955) is a Professor of Philosophy at the University of Connecticut and Director of the Expression, Communication, and the Origins of Meaning (ECOM) Research Group. Her research focuses on philosophy of language, philosophy of mind, epistemology, and metaethics. She previously held positions at the University of Rochester and UNC-Chapel Hill, where she was the Zachary Smith Distinguished Term Professor of Research and Undergraduate Education from 2014 to 2015.

== Education and career ==
Bar-On earned a BA at Tel Aviv University in Philosophy and Linguistics before earning her MA and PhD in Philosophy at UCLA. Her dissertation, Indeterminacy of Translation: Theory and Practice, was written under the supervision of Tyler Burge, Rogers Albritton, Keith Donnellan, David Kaplan, and David Pears. Bar-On has also written Hebrew translations of poetry, fiction, and philosophy, including three anthologies in modern philosophy, writings by Iris Murdoch, Kurt Vonnegut, Dos Passos, Dorothy Richardson, E. E. Cummings, Robert Louis Stevenson, Walter Scott, and, in collaboration with Marcia Falk, a collection of poems by Zelda Schneerson Mishkovsky and The Book of Blessings.

Her other professional experience includes being a radio producer, editor and broadcaster for the Israel IDF radio station, a television writer and host in Israel, and a Hebrew television newscaster and interviewer for Channel 18 in Los Angeles. Bar-On also formerly served as the President of MYCO@UNC, a youth chamber organization, from 2009 to 2012.

== Research ==
In Speaking My Mind: Expression and Self-Knowledge, published by Oxford University Press, Bar-On investigates the problem of self-knowledge in relation to questions of expression and expressive behavior. She draws on historical figures including Wittgenstein and Darwin to develop a neo-expressivist view of first-personal expressive utterances which explains how these utterances differ epistemically from non-expressive utterances while sharing the same semantic structure. Speaking My Mind was described by Joseph Owens of the University of Minnesota as "a rich book; rich in topics, in argumentation, and in philosophical imagination and insight." In subsequent work, Bar-On has applied this neo-expressivist framework to additional problems in the philosophy of language, metaethics, and epistemology. More recently, Bar-On has sought to illuminate the nature of human communication by situating it in relation to animal expressive communication more broadly, and thereby to show how human linguistic meaning can be understood consistently with a naturalistic theory of the world.

== Selected publications ==
- Speaking My Mind: Expression and Self-Knowledge (Oxford University Press, 2004)
- Expression and Self-Knowledge (co-authored with Crispin Wright) (Wiley-Blackwell, 2023)
- “First-Person Authority: Dualism, Constitutivism, and Neo-Expressivism” Erkenntnis 2009
- “The Use of Force Against Deflationism: Assertion and Truth”, (with Keith Simmons) in Truth and Speech Acts: Studies in the Philosophy of Language, Greimann and Siegwart, eds., Routledge, 2007, 61–89.
- “Deflationism”, (with Keith Simmons) in Oxford Handbook in Philosophy of Language, Ernie LePore, ed., Oxford University Press, 2006, 607–630. ISBN 978-0-19-925941-0.
