= 2000 in Japanese football =

2000 season

Japanese football in 2000

== National team (Men) ==
=== Results ===
2000.02.05	Japan	0–1	Mexico	Hong Kong
		JFA	? (?)

2000.02.13	Japan	3–0	Singapore	Macau
	Nakazawa 19', 90'; Nakayama 42'	JFA

2000.02.16	Japan	9–0	Brunei	Macau
	Nakayama 1', 2', 4'; K. Miura 36'; Nakamura 45'; Hirano 66'; Takahara 75', 88'; Sawanobori 85'	JFA

2000.02.20	Japan	3–0	Macau	Macau
	Nakayama 35', 65'; Takahara 57'	JFA

2000.03.15	Japan	0–0	China PR	Hyōgo, Japan
		JFA		Stadium: Kobe Universiade Memorial Stadium; Attendance: 39,482

2000.04.26	Japan	0–1	South Korea	Seoul, South Korea
		JFA	? (?)

2000.06.04	Japan	2–2 (2–4 p)	France	Casablanca, Morocco
	Morishima 34'; Nishizawa 70'	JFA	? (?) ? (?)

2000.06.06	Japan	4–0	Jamaica	Casablanca, Morocco
	Jo 47', 58'; Yanagisawa 65'; K. Miura 78'	JFA

2000.06.11	Japan	1–1	Slovakia	Miyagi, Japan
	Nakamura 9'	JFA	? (?)	Stadium: Miyagi Stadium; Attendance: 45,839

2000.06.18	Japan	2–0	Bolivia	Kanagawa, Japan
	Yanagisawa 7', 34'	JFA		Stadium: International Stadium Yokohama; Attendance: 65,073

2000.08.16	Japan	3–1	United Arab Emirates	Hiroshima, Japan
	Morishima 11'; Nakamura 27'; Oku 87'	JFA	? (?)	Stadium: Hiroshima Big Arch; Attendance: 32,402

2000.10.14	Japan	4–1	Saudi Arabia	Sidon, Lebanon
	Yanagisawa 26'; Takahara 39'; Nanami 54'; Ono 90'	JFA	? (?)

2000.10.17	Japan	8–1	Uzbekistan	Sidon, Lebanon
	Morishima 7'; Nishizawa 14', 25', 49'; Takahara 18', 20', 58'; Kitajima 79'	JFA	? (?)

2000.10.20	Japan	1–1	Qatar	Beirut, Lebanon
	Nishizawa 61'	JFA	? (?)

2000.10.24	Japan	4–1	Iraq	Beirut, Lebanon
	Nanami 7', 28'; Takahara 11'; Myojin 62'	JFA	? (?)

2000.10.26	Japan	3–2	China PR	Beirut, Lebanon
	21' (o.g.); Nishizawa 53'; Myojin 61'	JFA	? (?) ? (?)

2000.10.29	Japan	1–0	Saudi Arabia	Beirut, Lebanon
	Mochizuki 29'	JFA

2000.12.20	Japan	1–1	South Korea	Tokyo, Japan
	Hattori 56'	JFA	? (?)	Stadium: Tokyo National Stadium; Attendance: 54,145

=== Players statistics ===
Player	-1999	02.05	02.13	02.16	02.20	03.15	04.26	06.04	06.06	06.11	06.18	08.16	10.14	1017.	10.20	10.24	10.26	10.29	12.20	2000	Total
Kazuyoshi Miura	84(53)	O	-	O(1)	O	O	-	-	O(1)	-	-	-	-	-	-	-	-	-	-	5(2)	89(55)
Hiroshi Nanami	53(6)	O	-	-	-	O	O	O	O	-	-	-	O(1)	O	O	O(2)	O	O	O	12(3)	65(9)
Hiroaki Morishima	37(7)	-	-	-	-	-	O	O(1)	-	O	O	O(1)	O	O(1)	-	O	O	O	-	10(3)	47(10)
Yoshikatsu Kawaguchi	33(0)	-	O	O	-	-	-	-	O	-	-	-	O	O	-	O	O	O	-	8(0)	41(0)
Masashi Nakayama	32(14)	O	O(1)	O(3)	O(2)	O	O	-	-	-	-	-	-	-	-	-	-	-	O	7(6)	39(20)
Shoji Jo	32(5)	-	-	-	-	O	-	-	O(2)	-	-	-	-	-	-	-	-	-	-	2(2)	34(7)
Hidetoshi Nakata	29(6)	-	-	-	-	O	O	O	O	-	-	-	-	-	-	-	-	-	-	4(0)	33(6)
Takashi Hirano	12(3)	O	-	O(1)	O	-	-	-	-	-	-	-	-	-	-	-	-	-	-	3(1)	15(4)
Masaaki Sawanobori	12(2)	O	O	O(1)	O	-	-	-	-	-	-	-	-	-	-	-	-	-	-	4(1)	16(3)
Toshihiro Hattori	12(0)	-	-	O	O	O	O	-	-	-	-	O	O	O	O	O	O	O	O(1)	12(1)	24(1)
Eisuke Nakanishi	12(0)	-	-	-	-	-	-	-	-	O	-	-	-	-	-	-	-	-	-	1(0)	13(0)
Teruyoshi Ito	9(0)	O	O	-	-	-	O	O	O	O	-	-	-	-	-	-	-	-	O	7(0)	16(0)
Ryuzo Morioka	7(0)	-	-	-	-	O	O	O	O	O	O	O	O	O	O	O	O	O	O	14(0)	21(0)
Daisuke Oku	6(1)	O	O	O	-	-	-	-	O	O	O	O(1)	-	-	O	O	O	O	O	12(1)	18(2)
Atsushi Yanagisawa	6(0)	-	-	-	-	-	O	O	O(1)	O	O(2)	O	O(1)	-	-	-	O	O	O	10(4)	16(4)
Akinori Nishizawa	5(2)	-	-	-	-	-	-	O(1)	O	O	O	O	O	O(3)	O(1)	O	O(1)	O	-	11(6)	16(8)
Atsuhiro Miura	5(1)	-	-	-	-	-	O	O	O	O	O	O	O	-	O	-	-	-	-	8(0)	13(1)
Shigeyoshi Mochizuki	5(0)	O	-	-	-	O	O	-	-	-	O	O	-	O	O	O	-	O(1)	-	9(1)	14(1)
Seigo Narazaki	5(0)	O	-	-	O	O	O	O	-	O	O	O	-	-	-	-	-	-	O	9(0)	14(0)
Shinji Ono	3(0)	O	O	O	O	O	-	-	-	-	-	O	O(1)	O	O	O	-	O	O	12(1)	15(1)
Tatsuhiko Kubo	2(0)	-	-	-	-	-	-	-	O	O	O	O	-	-	O	-	-	-	-	5(0)	7(0)
Yuji Nakazawa	1(0)	-	O(2)	O	O	-	-	-	-	-	-	-	-	O	O	O	-	-	-	6(2)	7(2)
Shunsuke Nakamura	0(0)	-	O	O(1)	O	O	O	O	O	O(1)	O	O(1)	O	O	-	O	O	O	O	16(3)	16(3)
Naoki Matsuda	0(0)	O	O	O	O	O	O	O	O	O	O	-	O	-	-	-	O	O	O	14(0)	14(0)
Junichi Inamoto	0(0)	O	O	O	O	O	O	O	-	O	O	O	O	O	-	O	O	-	-	14(0)	14(0)
Naohiro Takahara	0(0)	-	O	O(2)	O(1)	-	O	-	-	-	O	O	O(1)	O(3)	-	O(1)	O	O	-	11(8)	11(8)
Tomokazu Myojin	0(0)	-	O	-	O	-	-	-	-	-	-	-	O	O	O	O(1)	O(1)	O	O	9(2)	9(2)
Koji Nakata	0(0)	O	O	-	O	O	-	-	O	-	O	-	-	-	-	-	-	-	O	7(0)	7(0)
Hideaki Kitajima	0(0)	-	-	-	-	-	-	-	-	-	-	-	-	O(1)	O	-	-	-	O	3(1)	3(1)
Go Oiwa	0(0)	O	-	-	-	-	-	O	-	O	-	-	-	-	-	-	-	-	-	3(0)	3(0)
Masashi Motoyama	0(0)	-	-	-	-	-	-	-	-	-	O	O	-	-	-	-	-	-	O	3(0)	3(0)
Tomoyuki Hirase	0(0)	O	O	-	-	-	-	-	-	-	-	-	-	-	-	-	-	-	-	2(0)	2(0)
Tsuneyasu Miyamoto	0(0)	-	-	-	-	-	-	-	-	-	O	O	-	-	-	-	-	-	-	2(0)	2(0)
Atsushi Yoneyama	0(0)	-	-	O	-	-	-	-	-	-	-	-	-	-	-	-	-	-	-	1(0)	1(0)
Hiromi Kojima	0(0)	-	-	-	-	-	O	-	-	-	-	-	-	-	-	-	-	-	-	1(0)	1(0)
Yoshiharu Ueno	0(0)	-	-	-	-	-	-	-	O	-	-	-	-	-	-	-	-	-	-	1(0)	1(0)
Daijiro Takakuwa	0(0)	-	-	-	-	-	-	-	-	-	-	-	-	-	O	-	-	-	-	1(0)	1(0)
Keiji Kaimoto	0(0)	-	-	-	-	-	-	-	-	-	-	-	-	-	O	-	-	-	-	1(0)	1(0)
Tomoyuki Sakai	0(0)	-	-	-	-	-	-	-	-	-	-	-	-	-	-	-	-	-	O	1(0)	1(0)

== National team (Women) ==
=== Results ===
2000.05.31	Japan	0–1	Australia	Australia
			? (?)

2000.06.02	Japan	2–1	New Zealand	Australia
	Nishina (?); Yamagishi (?)		? (?)

2000.06.04	Japan	0–2	China	Australia
			? (?) ? (?)

2000.06.08	Japan	1–4	United States	Australia
	Obe (?)		? (?) ? (?) ? (?) ? (?)

2000.06.10	Japan	1–5	Canada	Australia
	Sato (?)		? (?) ? (?) ? (?) ? (?) ? (?)

2000.12.17	Japan	1–1	United States	United States
	Sawa (?)		? (?)

=== Players statistics ===
Player	-1999	05.31	06.02	06.04	06.08	06.10	12.17	2000	Total
Homare Sawa	53(25)	-	-	-	-	-	O(1)	1(1)	54(26)
Kae Nishina	42(1)	-	O(1)	O	O	O	-	4(1)	46(2)
Yumi Obe	38(4)	O	O	O	O(1)	O	O	6(1)	44(5)
Tomoe Sakai	29(0)	-	-	-	-	-	O	1(0)	30(0)
Nozomi Yamago	24(0)	O	-	O	O	-	O	4(0)	28(0)
Hiromi Isozaki	23(0)	O	-	O	O	O	O	5(0)	28(0)
Mito Isaka	21(8)	O	O	O	O	O	-	5(0)	26(8)
Ayumi Hara	15(1)	O	O	O	O	O	O	6(0)	21(1)
Shiho Onodera	11(0)	-	O	-	-	O	-	2(0)	13(0)
Miyuki Yanagita	10(2)	O	-	O	-	O	-	3(0)	13(2)
Mai Nakachi	10(0)	-	-	-	-	-	O	1(0)	11(0)
Yasuyo Yamagishi	9(4)	O	O(1)	O	O	O	-	5(1)	14(5)
Yayoi Kobayashi	8(2)	-	-	-	-	-	O	1(0)	9(2)
Rie Kimura	8(0)	O	O	O	O	O	O	6(0)	14(0)
Tomomi Fujimura	7(0)	O	O	O	O	O	O	6(0)	13(0)
Yoshie Kasajima	5(1)	O	O	O	O	-	O	5(0)	10(1)
Megumi Torigoe	5(0)	-	O	-	-	O	-	2(0)	7(0)
Kozue Ando	1(0)	O	O	O	O	O	-	5(0)	6(0)
Yuka Yamazaki	0(0)	O	O	O	O	O	O	6(0)	6(0)
Mio Otani	0(0)	O	O	O	O	O	-	5(0)	5(0)
Harue Sato	0(0)	O	-	O	O	O(1)	-	4(1)	4(1)
Eriko Arakawa	0(0)	-	-	-	-	O	O	2(0)	2(0)
Megumi Ogawa	0(0)	-	-	-	-	-	O	1(0)	1(0)

== Births ==
- 28 July: Keito Nakamura
