= 2004 in Japanese football =

2004 season

Japanese football in 2004

== National team (Men) ==
=== Results ===
2004.02.07	Japan	4–0	Malaysia	Ibaraki, Japan
	Ogasawara 10'; Miyamoto 37'; N. Yamada 45'; Endō 46'	JFA		Stadium: Kashima Soccer Stadium; Attendance: 29,530

2004.02.12	Japan	2–0	Iraq	Tokyo, Japan
	Yanagisawa 47'; Santos 84'	JFA		Stadium: Tokyo National Stadium; Attendance: 38,622

2004.02.18	Japan	1–0	Oman	Saitama, Japan
	Kubo 90'	JFA		Stadium: Saitama Stadium 2002; Attendance: 60,207

2004.03.31	Japan	2–1	Singapore	Singapore
	Takahara 34'; Fujita 82'	JFA	? (?)	Attendance: 6,000

2004.04.25	Japan	2–3	Hungary	Zalaegerszeg, Hungary
	Tamada 75'; Kubo 77'	JFA	? (?) ? (?) ? (?)	Attendance: 12,000

2004.04.28	Japan	1–0	Czech Republic	Prague, Czech Republic
	Kubo 33'	JFA		Attendance: 11,802

2004.05.30	Japan	3–2	Iceland	Manchester, England
	Kubo 21', 36'; Santos 58'	JFA	? (?) ? (?)

2004.06.01	Japan	1–1	England	Manchester, England
	Ono 53'	JFA	? (?)	Attendance: 38,581

2004.06.09	Japan	7–0	India	Saitama, Japan
	Kubo 12'; Fukunishi 25'; Nakamura 29'; Suzuki 54'; Nakazawa 65', 76'; Ogasawara 68'	JFA		Stadium: Saitama Stadium 2002; Attendance: 63,148

2004.07.09	Japan	3–1	Slovakia	Hiroshima, Japan
	Fukunishi 45'; Suzuki 66'; Yanagisawa 81'	JFA	? (?)	Stadium: Hiroshima Big Arch; Attendance: 34,458

2004.07.13	Japan	1–0	Serbia and Montenegro	Kanagawa, Japan
	Endō 48'	JFA		Stadium: International Stadium Yokohama; Attendance: 57,616

2004.07.20	Japan	1–0	Oman	Chongqing, China PR
	Nakamura 34'	JFA		Attendance: 35,000

2004.07.24	Japan	4–1	Thailand	Chongqing, China PR
	Nakamura 21'; Nakazawa 56', 87'; Fukunishi 68'	JFA	? (?)	Attendance: 45,000

2004.07.28	Japan	0–0	Iran	Chongqing, China PR
		JFA		Attendance: 52,000

2004.07.31	Japan	1–1 (a.e.t.) (4–3 p)	Jordan	Chongqing, China PR
	Suzuki 14'	JFA	? (?)	Attendance: 52,000

2004.08.03	Japan	4–3 (a.e.t.)	Bahrain	Jinan, China PR
	K. Nakata 48'; Tamada 55', 93'; Nakazawa 90'	JFA	? (?) ? (?) ? (?)	Attendance: 32,050

2004.08.07	Japan	3–1	China PR	Beijing, China PR
	Fukunishi 22'; K. Nakata 65'; Tamada 90'	JFA	? (?)	Attendance: 62,000

2004.08.18	Japan	1–2	Argentina	Shizuoka, Japan
	Suzuki 73'	JFA	? (?) ? (?)	Stadium: Shizuoka Stadium; Attendance: 45,721

2004.09.08	Japan	4–0	India	Kolkata, India
	Suzuki 45'; Ono 60'; Fukunishi 71'; Miyamoto 87'	JFA

2004.10.13	Japan	1–0	Oman	Muscat, Oman
	Suzuki 52'	JFA		Attendance: 35,000

2004.11.17	Japan	1–0	Singapore	Saitama, Japan
	Tamada 13'	JFA		Stadium: Saitama Stadium 2002; Attendance: 58,881

2004.12.16	Japan	0–3	Germany	Kanagawa, Japan
		JFA	? (?) ? (?) ? (?)	Stadium: International Stadium Yokohama; Attendance: 63,023

=== Players statistics ===
Player	-2003	02.07	02.12	02.18	03.31	04.25	04.28	05.30	06.01	06.09	07.09	07.13	07.20	07.24	07.28	07.31	08.03	08.07	08.18	09.08	10.13	11.17	12.16	2004	Total
Hidetoshi Nakata	59(10)	-	-	O	O	-	-	-	-	-	-	-	-	-	-	-	-	-	-	-	-	-	-	2(0)	61(10)
Yoshikatsu Kawaguchi	54(0)	-	-	-	-	-	-	-	-	O	O	O	O	O	O	O	O	O	-	O	O	-	-	11(0)	65(0)
Junichi Inamoto	45(4)	-	-	O	O	-	O	O	O	-	-	-	-	-	-	-	-	-	-	-	-	-	O	6(0)	51(4)
Koji Nakata	40(0)	-	-	-	-	-	-	-	-	-	-	-	-	O	-	O	O(1)	O(1)	O	-	-	O	-	6(2)	46(2)
Shinji Ono	37(3)	-	-	-	O	-	O	O	O(1)	O	-	-	-	-	-	-	-	-	-	O(1)	O	-	-	7(2)	44(5)
Seigo Narazaki	37(0)	-	O	O	O	O	O	O	O	-	-	-	-	-	-	-	-	-	O	-	-	-	O	9(0)	46(0)
Atsushi Yanagisawa	36(11)	-	O(1)	O	O	-	O	O	O	-	O(1)	O	-	-	-	-	-	-	-	-	-	-	-	8(2)	44(13)
Naoki Matsuda	36(0)	-	-	-	-	-	-	-	-	-	-	-	-	-	-	O	-	-	O	-	-	O	-	3(0)	39(0)
Shunsuke Nakamura	31(9)	-	O	O	O	-	-	O	O	O(1)	O	O	O(1)	O(1)	O	O	O	O	-	-	O	-	-	15(3)	46(12)
Naohiro Takahara	27(11)	-	-	O	O(1)	-	-	-	-	-	-	-	-	-	-	-	-	-	-	O	O	-	O	5(1)	32(12)
Takayuki Suzuki	27(4)	-	-	O	O	-	-	O	O	O(1)	O(1)	O	O	O	O	O(1)	O	O	O(1)	O(1)	O(1)	O	O	18(6)	45(10)
Tsuneyasu Miyamoto	26(0)	O(1)	O	O	O	-	-	O	O	O	O	O	O	O	O	O	O	O	O	O(1)	O	O	-	19(2)	45(2)
Daisuke Oku	25(2)	O	-	-	-	-	-	-	-	-	-	-	-	-	-	-	-	-	-	-	-	-	-	1(0)	26(2)
Alessandro Santos	24(2)	O	O(1)	O	O	O	O	O(1)	O	O	O	O	O	O	O	O	O	O	O	O	O	O	O	22(2)	46(4)
Takashi Fukunishi	21(0)	-	O	-	-	O	O	O	O	O(1)	O(1)	O	O	O(1)	O	O	O	O(1)	O	O(1)	O	-	O	18(5)	39(5)
Tatsuhiko Kubo	17(2)	O	O	O(1)	-	O(1)	O(1)	O(2)	O	O(1)	-	-	-	-	-	-	-	-	-	O	-	-	-	9(5)	26(8)
Atsuhiro Miura	17(1)	O	-	-	-	O	O	-	-	-	O	-	-	-	-	-	-	-	-	-	-	O	O	6(0)	23(1)
Mitsuo Ogasawara	16(0)	O(1)	O	O	-	-	-	O	-	O(1)	O	-	-	O	-	-	O	-	O	O	-	O	O	12(2)	28(2)
Yuji Nakazawa	14(2)	O	-	-	-	-	-	O	O	O(2)	O	O	O	O(2)	O	O	O(1)	O	O	O	O	-	-	15(5)	29(7)
Yoshito Ōkubo	14(0)	-	O	-	-	-	-	-	-	-	-	-	-	-	-	-	-	-	-	-	-	O	O	3(0)	17(0)
Toshiya Fujita	13(2)	O	O	-	O(1)	O	O	-	-	O	-	-	-	-	-	-	-	-	O	O	-	O	O	10(1)	23(3)
Yasuhito Endō	12(1)	O(1)	O	O	-	O	O	O	-	-	O	O(1)	O	O	O	O	O	-	O	-	-	O	O	16(2)	28(3)
Nobuhisa Yamada	12(0)	O(1)	O	O	-	-	-	-	-	-	-	-	-	-	-	-	-	-	-	-	-	-	-	3(1)	15(1)
Keisuke Tsuboi	11(0)	O	O	O	O	O	O	O	O	O	O	-	-	-	-	-	-	-	-	-	-	-	-	10(0)	21(0)
Masashi Motoyama	6(0)	O	-	-	-	O	O	O	-	-	O	-	O	O	O	O	-	-	O	O	-	O	-	12(0)	18(0)
Teruaki Kurobe	3(0)	O	-	-	-	-	-	-	-	-	-	-	-	-	-	-	-	-	-	-	-	-	-	1(0)	4(0)
Teruyuki Moniwa	2(0)	O	-	-	-	-	-	-	-	-	-	-	-	-	-	-	-	-	-	-	-	-	-	1(0)	3(0)
Ryota Tsuzuki	2(0)	O	-	-	-	-	-	-	-	-	-	-	-	-	-	-	-	-	-	-	-	-	-	1(0)	3(0)
Akira Kaji	1(0)	O	-	-	O	O	O	O	O	O	O	O	O	O	O	O	O	O	O	O	O	O	O	20(0)	21(0)
Takuya Yamada	1(0)	O	O	-	-	-	-	-	-	-	-	-	-	-	-	-	-	-	O	-	-	-	-	3(0)	4(0)
Naohiro Ishikawa	1(0)	O	-	-	-	-	-	-	-	-	-	-	-	-	-	-	-	-	-	-	-	-	-	1(0)	2(0)
Keiji Tamada	0(0)	-	-	-	O	O(1)	O	O	O	O	O	O	O	O	O	O	O(2)	O(1)	O	-	O	O(1)	O	18(5)	18(5)
Makoto Tanaka	0(0)	-	-	-	-	O	O	-	-	-	O	O	O	O	O	O	O	O	O	O	O	-	O	14(0)	14(0)
Norihiro Nishi	0(0)	-	-	-	-	O	O	-	-	-	-	-	O	-	-	-	O	-	-	-	-	-	O	5(0)	5(0)
Takayuki Chano	0(0)	-	-	-	-	O	O	-	-	-	-	-	-	-	-	-	-	-	-	-	-	-	O	3(0)	3(0)
Yoichi Doi	0(0)	O	-	-	-	-	-	-	-	-	-	-	-	-	-	-	-	-	-	-	-	O	-	2(0)	2(0)

== National team (Women) ==
=== Results ===
2004.04.18	Japan	7–0	Vietnam	Tokyo, Japan
	Miyamoto (?); Otani (?); Maruyama (?); Yamamoto (?); Sawa (?)			Stadium: Komazawa Olympic Park Stadium

2004.04.22	Japan	6–0	Thailand	Tokyo, Japan
	Maruyama (?); Ando (?); Kobayashi (?); Otani (?); Yamamoto (?)			Stadium: National Stadium

2004.04.24	Japan	3–0	North Korea	Tokyo, Japan
	Arakawa (?) (?); Otani (?)			Stadium: National Stadium

2004.04.26	Japan	0–1	China	Hiroshima, Japan
			? (?)	Stadium: Hiroshima Big Arch

2004.06.06	Japan	1–1	United States	United States
	Arakawa (?)		? (?)

2004.07.30	Japan	3–0	Canada	Tokyo, Japan
	Otani (?) (?)			Stadium: National Stadium

2004.08.06	Japan	2–0	Netherlands	Netherlands
	Otani (?) ? (?)

2004.08.11	Japan	1–0	Sweden	Greece
	Arakawa (?)

2004.08.14	Japan	0–1	Nigeria	Greece
			? (?)

2004.08.20	Japan	1–2	United States	Greece
	Yamamoto (?)		? (?) ? (?)

2004.12.18	Japan	11–0	Chinese Taipei	Tokyo, Japan
	Arakawa (?); Miyama (?); Ono (?); Sawa (?); Kitamoto (?)			Stadium: Nishigaoka Soccer Stadium

=== Players statistics ===
Player	-2003	04.18	04.22	04.24	04.26	06.06	07.30	08.06	08.11	08.14	08.20	12.18	2004	Total
Homare Sawa	82(47)	O(1)	-	O	O	-	-	O	O	O	O	O(1)	8(2)	90(49)
Yumi Obe	81(6)	-	O	-	O	-	O	O	-	-	-	-	4(0)	85(6)
Nozomi Yamago	61(0)	O	-	O	O	O	O	O	O	O	O	O	10(0)	71(0)
Tomoe Sakai	57(2)	O	O	O	O	O	O	O	O	O	O	O	11(0)	68(2)
Hiromi Isozaki	55(4)	O	-	O	O	O	O	O	O	O	O	O	10(0)	65(4)
Tomomi Miyamoto	51(9)	O(2)	-	O	O	O	O	O	O	O	O	-	9(2)	60(11)
Yasuyo Yamagishi	48(6)	O	O	O	-	O	O	O	O	O	O	O	10(0)	58(6)
Yayoi Kobayashi	46(11)	O	O(1)	-	O	O	O	O	O	O	-	-	8(1)	54(12)
Mio Otani	40(24)	O(2)	O(1)	O(1)	O	O	O(2)	O(1)	O	O	O	-	10(7)	50(31)
Naoko Kawakami	34(0)	O	-	O	O	O	O	O	O	O	O	O	10(0)	44(0)
Miyuki Yanagita	27(3)	O	O	O	O	O	O	O	O	O	O	O	11(0)	38(3)
Ayumi Hara	27(1)	-	-	-	-	-	-	-	-	-	-	O	1(0)	28(1)
Shiho Onodera	20(0)	-	O	-	-	-	O	O	-	-	-	-	3(0)	23(0)
Karina Maruyama	17(6)	O(1)	O(2)	O	O	O	O	O	O	O	O	O	11(3)	28(9)
Yuka Miyazaki	16(2)	-	O	-	-	-	-	-	-	-	-	-	1(0)	17(2)
Eriko Arakawa	15(5)	O	-	O(1)	O	O(1)	O	O	O(1)	O	O	O(2)	10(5)	25(10)
Emi Yamamoto	14(1)	O(1)	O(1)	O	O	O	-	O	-	O	O(1)	-	8(3)	22(4)
Kozue Ando	12(2)	-	O(1)	-	-	O	O	O	O	-	-	O	6(1)	18(3)
Kyoko Yano	9(1)	-	O	O	O	O	-	-	-	-	O	-	5(0)	14(1)
Aya Miyama	6(2)	-	-	-	-	-	-	-	-	-	-	O(2)	1(2)	7(4)
Shinobu Ono	5(2)	-	-	-	-	-	-	-	-	-	-	O(3)	1(3)	6(5)
Nao Shikata	3(0)	-	-	-	-	-	-	-	-	-	-	O	1(0)	4(0)
Aya Shimokozuru	0(0)	O	O	O	-	O	O	O	O	O	O	O	10(0)	10(0)
Ayako Kitamoto	0(0)	-	-	-	-	O	-	-	-	-	-	O(3)	2(3)	2(3)
Yuki Nagasato	0(0)	-	O	-	-	-	-	-	-	-	-	-	1(0)	1(0)
Nayuha Toyoda	0(0)	-	-	-	-	-	-	-	-	-	-	O	1(0)	1(0)

== Births ==
- 4 September: Kōta Takai
