= 2006 in Japanese football =

2006 season

Japanese football in 2006

== National team (Men) ==
=== Results ===
2006.02.10	Japan	2–3	United States	San Francisco, United States
	Maki 60'; Nakazawa 90'	JFA	? (?) ? (?) ? (?)	Attendance: 37,365

2006.02.18	Japan	2–0	Finland	Shizuoka, Japan
	Kubo 48'; Ogasawara 57'	JFA		Stadium: Shizuoka Stadium; Attendance: 40,702

2006.02.22	Japan	6–0	India	Kanagawa, Japan
	Ono 32'; Maki 58'; Fukunishi 68'; Kubo 79', 90'; H. Satō 83'	JFA		Stadium: International Stadium Yokohama; Attendance: 38,025

2006.02.28	Japan	2–2	Bosnia and Herzegovina	Dortmund, Germany
	Takahara 45'; H. Nakata 90'	JFA	? (?) ? (?)	Attendance: 8,120

2006.03.30	Japan	1–0	Ecuador	Ōita, Japan
	H. Satō 85'	JFA		Stadium: Ōita Stadium; Attendance: 36,507

2006.05.09	Japan	1–2	Bulgaria	Osaka, Japan
	Maki 76'	JFA	? (?) ? (?)	Stadium: Osaka Nagai Stadium; Attendance: 44,851

2006.05.13	Japan	0–0	Scotland	Saitama, Japan
		JFA		Stadium: Saitama Stadium 2002; Attendance: 58,648

2006.05.30	Japan	2–2	Germany	Leverkusen, Germany
	Takahara 57', 65'	JFA	? (?) ? (?)	Attendance: 22,500

2006.06.04	Japan	1–0	Malta	Düsseldorf, Germany
	Tamada 2'	JFA		Attendance: 10,802

2006.06.12	Japan	1–3	Australia	Kaiserslautern, Germany
	S. Nakamura 26'	JFA	? (?) ? (?) ? (?)	Attendance: 46,000

2006.06.18	Japan	0–0	Croatia	Nürnberg, Germany
		JFA		Attendance: 41,000

2006.06.22	Japan	1–4	Brazil	Dortmund, Germany
	Tamada 34'	JFA	? (?) ? (?) ? (?) ? (?)	Attendance: 65,000

2006.08.09	Japan	2–0	Trinidad and Tobago	Tokyo, Japan
	Santos 17', 22'	JFA		Stadium: Tokyo National Stadium; Attendance: 47,482

2006.08.16	Japan	2–0	Yemen	Niigata, Japan
	Abe 70'; H. Satō 90'	JFA		Stadium: Niigata Stadium; Attendance: 40,913

2006.09.03	Japan	0–1	Saudi Arabia	Jeddah, Saudi Arabia
		JFA	? (?)	Attendance: 15,000

2006.09.06	Japan	1–0	Yemen	Sana'a, Yemen
	Ganaha 90'	JFA		Attendance: 7,000

2006.10.04	Japan	0–1	Ghana	Kanagawa, Japan
		JFA	? (?)	Stadium: International Stadium Yokohama; Attendance: 52,437

2006.10.11	Japan	3–0	India	Bangalore, India
	Bando 22', 43'; K. Nakamura 81'	JFA		Attendance: 5,000

2006.11.15	Japan	3–1	Saudi Arabia	Hokkaido, Japan
	Tulio 20'; Ganaha 29', 50'	JFA	? (?)	Stadium: Sapporo Dome; Attendance: 40,965

=== Players statistics ===
Player	-2005	02.10	02.18	02.22	02.28	03.30	05.09	05.13	05.30	06.04	06.12	06.18	06.22	08.09	08.16	09.03	09.06	10.04	10.11	11.15	2006	Total
Yoshikatsu Kawaguchi	79(0)	O	O	O	O	O	O	O	O	O	O	O	O	O	O	O	O	O	O	O	19(0)	98(0)
Hidetoshi Nakata	71(10)	-	-	-	O(1)	-	-	-	O	O	O	O	O	-	-	-	-	-	-	-	6(1)	77(11)
Alessandro Santos	63(5)	O	O	O	O	O	O	O	O	O	O	O	O	O(2)	O	O	O	O	O	O	19(2)	82(7)
Junichi Inamoto	61(4)	-	-	-	O	-	-	-	-	O	-	O	O	-	-	-	-	-	-	-	4(0)	65(4)
Tsuneyasu Miyamoto	60(3)	O	O	O	O	O	O	O	O	O	O	O	-	-	-	-	-	-	-	-	11(0)	71(3)
Shunsuke Nakamura	57(15)	-	-	-	O	-	-	-	O	O	O(1)	O	O	-	-	-	-	-	-	-	6(1)	63(16)
Atsushi Yanagisawa	54(17)	-	-	-	O	-	-	-	O	-	O	O	-	-	-	-	-	-	-	-	4(0)	58(17)
Kōji Nakata	54(2)	-	-	-	-	-	-	-	-	O	-	-	O	-	-	-	-	-	-	-	2(0)	56(2)
Takashi Fukunishi	53(6)	O	O	O(1)	O	O	O	O	O	O	O	O	-	-	-	-	-	-	-	-	11(1)	64(7)
Shinji Ono	46(5)	O	O	O(1)	O	O	O	O	-	O	O	-	-	-	-	-	-	-	-	-	9(1)	55(6)
Mitsuo Ogasawara	43(6)	O	O(1)	O	O	O	O	O	-	O	-	O	O	-	-	-	-	-	-	-	10(1)	53(7)
Yuji Nakazawa	41(8)	O(1)	O	O	O	O	O	O	O	O	O	O	O	-	-	-	-	-	-	-	12(1)	53(9)
Naohiro Takahara	39(14)	-	-	-	O(1)	-	-	-	O(2)	-	O	O	O	-	-	-	-	-	-	-	5(3)	44(17)
Yasuhito Endō	36(3)	O	-	O	-	-	O	O	-	-	-	-	-	-	O	O	O	O	-	-	8(0)	44(3)
Akira Kaji	35(1)	O	O	O	O	O	O	O	O	-	-	O	O	-	O	O	O	-	-	O	14(0)	49(1)
Keiji Tamada	34(7)	-	-	-	-	O	O	O	O	O(1)	-	O	O(1)	-	-	-	-	-	-	-	7(2)	41(9)
Makoto Tanaka	30(0)	O	-	-	-	-	O	-	-	-	-	-	-	-	-	-	-	-	-	-	2(0)	32(0)
Keisuke Tsuboi	28(0)	-	O	-	-	O	-	O	O	O	O	-	O	O	O	O	O	-	-	-	11(0)	39(0)
Tatsuhiko Kubo	26(8)	O	O(1)	O(2)	O	O	-	O	-	-	-	-	-	-	-	-	-	-	-	-	6(3)	32(11)
Masashi Motoyama	26(0)	O	O	-	-	-	-	-	-	-	-	-	-	-	-	-	-	-	-	-	2(0)	28(0)
Masashi Oguro	15(5)	-	-	-	O	-	-	-	O	O	O	O	O	-	-	-	-	-	-	-	6(0)	21(5)
Teruyuki Moniwa	7(1)	-	-	O	-	-	-	-	-	-	O	-	-	-	-	-	-	-	-	-	2(0)	9(1)
Yūichi Komano	5(0)	-	O	-	-	-	-	-	O	O	O	-	-	O	O	O	-	O	O	O	10(0)	15(0)
Yuki Abe	5(0)	O	-	-	-	-	O	-	-	-	-	-	-	-	O(1)	O	O	O	O	O	8(1)	13(1)
Seiichiro Maki	3(0)	O(1)	O	O(1)	-	O	O(1)	O	-	O	-	-	O	-	O	O	O	O	O	O	14(3)	17(3)
Yasuyuki Konno	3(0)	-	-	-	-	-	-	-	-	-	-	-	-	-	-	-	-	O	O	O	3(0)	6(0)
Shinji Murai	3(0)	-	O	-	-	-	O	-	-	-	-	-	-	-	-	-	-	-	-	-	2(0)	5(0)
Tatsuya Tanaka	2(1)	-	-	-	-	-	-	-	-	-	-	-	-	O	O	O	O	-	-	-	4(0)	6(1)
Hisato Satō	0(0)	O	O	O(1)	-	O(1)	O	O	-	-	-	-	-	O	O(1)	O	O	O	O	-	12(3)	12(3)
Keita Suzuki	0(0)	-	-	-	-	-	-	-	-	-	-	-	-	O	O	O	O	O	O	O	7(0)	7(0)
Kazuki Ganaha	0(0)	-	-	-	-	-	-	-	-	-	-	-	-	O	-	O	O(1)	O	O	O(2)	6(3)	6(3)
Makoto Hasebe	0(0)	O	-	O	-	-	O	-	-	-	-	-	-	O	-	-	-	O	O	-	6(0)	6(0)
Marcus Tulio Tanaka	0(0)	-	-	-	-	-	-	-	-	-	-	-	-	O	O	O	O	-	-	O(1)	5(1)	5(1)
Naotake Hanyu	0(0)	-	-	-	-	-	-	-	-	-	-	-	-	-	O	O	O	O	-	O	5(0)	5(0)
Kengo Nakamura	0(0)	-	-	-	-	-	-	-	-	-	-	-	-	-	-	-	-	O	O(1)	O	3(1)	3(1)
Satoru Yamagishi	0(0)	-	-	-	-	-	-	-	-	-	-	-	-	-	-	-	-	O	O	O	3(0)	3(0)
Ryūji Bando	0(0)	-	-	-	-	-	-	-	-	-	-	-	-	-	-	-	-	O	O(2)	-	2(2)	2(2)
Hiroki Mizumoto	0(0)	-	-	-	-	-	-	-	-	-	-	-	-	-	-	-	-	O	O	-	2(0)	2(0)
Hayuma Tanaka	0(0)	-	-	-	-	-	-	-	-	-	-	-	-	O	-	-	-	-	-	-	1(0)	1(0)
Koji Yamase	0(0)	-	-	-	-	-	-	-	-	-	-	-	-	O	-	-	-	-	-	-	1(0)	1(0)
Daigo Kobayashi	0(0)	-	-	-	-	-	-	-	-	-	-	-	-	O	-	-	-	-	-	-	1(0)	1(0)
Yuzo Kurihara	0(0)	-	-	-	-	-	-	-	-	-	-	-	-	O	-	-	-	-	-	-	1(0)	1(0)
Naoshi Nakamura	0(0)	-	-	-	-	-	-	-	-	-	-	-	-	O	-	-	-	-	-	-	1(0)	1(0)
Daisuke Sakata	0(0)	-	-	-	-	-	-	-	-	-	-	-	-	O	-	-	-	-	-	-	1(0)	1(0)
Yūto Satō	0(0)	-	-	-	-	-	-	-	-	-	-	-	-	-	O	-	-	-	-	-	1(0)	1(0)
Tsukasa Umesaki	0(0)	-	-	-	-	-	-	-	-	-	-	-	-	-	-	-	O	-	-	-	1(0)	1(0)
Takahiro Futagawa	(0)	-	-	-	-	-	-	-	-	-	-	-	-	-	-	-	-	O	-	-	1(0)	1(0)
Daiki Takamatsu	0(0)	-	-	-	-	-	-	-	-	-	-	-	-	-	-	-	-	-	-	O	1(0)	1(0)

== National team (Women) ==
=== Results ===
2006.02.18	Japan	2–0	Russia	Shizuoka, Japan
	Nagasato (?) (?)			Stadium: Shizuoka Stadium

2006.03.10	Japan	4–0	Scotland	Italy
	Sakai (?); Sawa (?); Ando (?); Arakawa (?)

2006.03.12	Japan	0–1	Italy	Italy
			? (?)

2006.05.07	Japan	1–3	United States	Kumamoto, Japan
	Iwashimizu (?)		? (?) ? (?) ? (?)	Stadium: Kumamoto Athletics Stadium

2006.05.09	Japan	0–1	United States	Osaka, Japan
			? (?)	Stadium: Osaka Nagai Stadium

2006.07.19	Japan	5–0	Vietnam	Australia
	Sawa (?); Sakaguchi (?); Nagasato (?)

2006.07.21	Japan	11–1	Chinese Taipei	Australia
	Ono (?); Nagasato (?); Sawa (?); Sakaguchi (?); Yanagita (?)		? (?)

2006.07.23	Japan	1–0	China	Australia
	Miyama (?)

2006.07.27	Japan	0–2	Australia	Australia
			? (?) ? (?)

2006.07.30	Japan	2–3	North Korea	Australia
	Ando (?); Nagasato (?)		? (?) ? (?) ? (?)

2006.11.19	Japan	1–0	Australia	Chiba, Japan
	Ono (?)			Stadium: Chiba Soga Football Stadium

2006.11.23	Japan	3–6	Germany	Germany
	Ono (?); Miyama (?); Maruyama (?)		? (?) ? (?) ? (?) ? (?) ? (?) ? (?)

2006.11.30	Japan	13–0	Jordan	Qatar
	Yanagita (?); Miyama (?); Sudo (?); Arakawa (?); Sakaguchi (?); Sawa (?); Sakai (?)

2006.12.04	Japan	4–0	Thailand	Qatar
	Sakaguchi (?); Ono (?); Arakawa (?); Ando (?)

2006.12.07	Japan	1–0	China	Qatar
	Iwashimizu (?)

2006.12.10	Japan	3–1	South Korea	Qatar
	Iwashimizu (?); Yanagita (?); Nagasato (?)		? (?)

2006.12.13	Japan	0–0 (2–4 p)	North Korea	Qatar

=== Players statistics ===
Player	-2005	02.18	03.10	03.12	05.07	05.09	07.19	07.21	07.23	07.27	07.30	11.19	11.23	11.30	12.04	12.07	12.10	12.13	2006	Total
Homare Sawa	99(52)	O	O(1)	O	O	O	O(2)	O(2)	O	O	O	O	O	O(2)	O	O	O	O	17(7)	116(59)
Nozomi Yamago	76(0)	O	O	O	-	-	-	-	-	-	-	-	-	O	-	-	-	-	4(0)	80(0)
Tomoe Sakai	77(3)	O	O(1)	O	O	O	O	O	-	O	O	O	O	O(1)	O	O	O	O	16(2)	93(5)
Hiromi Isozaki	74(4)	O	O	O	O	O	O	O	O	O	O	O	O	O	O	O	O	O	17(0)	91(4)
Tomomi Miyamoto	60(11)	-	-	-	-	-	-	-	-	-	-	O	-	-	-	-	-	-	1(0)	61(11)
Mio Otani	57(31)	O	O	O	O	O	O	-	O	O	O	-	-	-	-	-	-	-	9(0)	66(31)
Miyuki Yanagita	47(6)	O	O	O	-	-	O	O(1)	O	O	O	O	O	O(2)	O	O	O(1)	O	15(4)	62(10)
Karina Maruyama	31(9)	O	O	O	O	-	-	-	-	-	-	O	O(1)	O	O	O	-	-	9(1)	40(10)
Kozue Ando	27(4)	O	O(1)	O	O	O	-	O	O	O	O(1)	O	O	O	O(1)	O	O	O	16(3)	43(7)
Eriko Arakawa	25(10)	O	O(1)	O	O	O	O	-	-	-	O	O	O	O(1)	O(1)	O	O	O	14(3)	39(13)
Kyoko Yano	19(1)	O	O	O	O	O	O	O	O	O	O	O	O	-	O	O	O	O	16(0)	35(1)
Aya Miyama	16(6)	O	O	O	O	O	O	O	O(1)	O	O	O	O(1)	O(1)	O	O	O	O	17(3)	33(9)
Aya Shimokozuru	15(0)	O	O	O	-	-	O	O	O	O	O	O	O	-	O	-	-	-	11(0)	26(0)
Shinobu Ono	13(6)	O	O	O	O	O	O	O(1)	O	O	O	O(1)	O(1)	-	O(1)	O	O	O	16(4)	29(10)
Yuki Nagasato	10(6)	O(1)	-	-	O	O	O(1)	O(5)	O	O	O(1)	O	O	-	-	O	O(1)	O	13(9)	23(15)
Akiko Sudo	7(1)	-	-	-	-	-	-	-	-	-	-	-	-	O(1)	-	-	-	-	1(1)	8(2)
Miho Fukumoto	6(0)	-	-	-	O	O	O	O	O	O	O	O	O	-	O	O	O	O	13(0)	19(0)
Nao Shikata	6(0)	-	O	-	-	-	-	O	-	-	-	-	-	-	-	-	-	-	2(0)	8(0)
Rumi Utsugi	5(0)	-	-	-	O	O	-	-	-	-	-	-	-	-	-	-	-	-	2(0)	7(0)
Maiko Nakaoka	3(0)	-	O	-	-	O	-	O	O	O	-	-	O	O	-	O	O	O	10(0)	13(0)
Yukari Kinga	1(0)	O	O	-	-	-	-	-	-	-	-	-	-	-	-	-	-	-	2(0)	3(0)
Azusa Iwashimizu	0(0)	O	-	-	O(1)	O	O	-	-	-	-	-	O	O	O	O(1)	O(1)	O	10(3)	10(3)
Mizuho Sakaguchi	0(0)	-	-	-	-	-	O(2)	O(2)	O	O	O	-	-	O(5)	O(1)	-	-	-	7(10)	7(10)

== Births ==
- 16 October: Ryūnosuke Satō
