= 2015 in Japanese football =

2015 season

Japanese football in 2015.

== J1 League ==
Sanfrecce Hiroshima won the Clausura title, accumulating the most points in the overall table and thus getting a bye to the Championship final, where they met third-place Gamba Osaka, who had defeated Apertura champions Urawa Red Diamonds in the semifinal. Hiroshima won the two-legged final for their eighth overall Japanese title, regaining the record position they had set in 1970 and which they had held until the old Japan Soccer League folded.

Shimizu S-Pulse was relegated to the second tier for the first time, after being one of the co-founders of the J. League back in 1993 (a placement that was deemed questionable in many quarters due to their lack of JSL record). Following after cameo appearances were Montedio Yamagata, in their fourth season, and Matsumoto Yamaga, who was debuting in the top flight only four years after being promoted from what was the third tier at the time, the Japan Football League.

Pos	Team	Pld	W	D	L	GF	GA	GD	Pts	Qualification or relegation
1	Sanfrecce Hiroshima (C)	34	23	5	6	73	30	+43	74	Club World Cup, Champions League group stage and J.League Championship Final
2	Urawa Red Diamonds	34	21	9	4	69	40	+29	72	Champions League group stage and J.League Championship 1st Round
3	Gamba Osaka	34	18	9	7	56	37	+19	63	Champions League group stage and J.League Championship 1st Round
4	FC Tokyo	34	19	6	9	45	33	+12	63	Champions League qualifying play-off (Note: The winner of the 2015 Emperor's Cup qualified for the Group Stage of the 2016 AFC Champions League. Since the Emperor's Cup winner was Gamba Osaka who were the third-placed team, the qualifying play-off spot was awarded to the fourth-placed team.)
5	Kashima Antlers	34	18	5	11	57	41	+16	59	
6	Kawasaki Frontale	34	17	6	11	62	48	+14	57	
7	Yokohama F. Marinos	34	15	10	9	45	32	+13	55	
8	Shonan Bellmare	34	13	9	12	40	44	−4	48	
9	Nagoya Grampus	34	13	7	14	44	48	−4	46	
10	Kashiwa Reysol	34	12	9	13	46	43	+3	45	
11	Sagan Tosu	34	9	13	12	37	54	−17	40	
12	Vissel Kobe	34	10	8	16	44	49	−5	38	
13	Ventforet Kofu	34	10	7	17	26	43	−17	37	
14	Vegalta Sendai	34	9	8	17	44	48	−4	35	
15	Albirex Niigata	34	8	10	16	41	58	−17	34	
16	Matsumoto Yamaga (R)	34	7	7	20	30	54	−24	28	Relegation to 2016 J2 League
17	Shimizu S-Pulse (R)	34	5	10	19	37	65	−28	25	Relegation to 2016 J2 League
18	Montedio Yamagata (R)	34	4	12	18	24	53	−29	24	Relegation to 2016 J2 League

Updated to match(es) played on 28 November 2015. Source: Meiji Yasuda J1 League Standings
Rules for classification: 1) Points; 2) Goal difference; 3) Goals scored
(C) Champions; (R) Relegated

== J2 League ==
Omiya Ardija won the title and returned to the top flight at the first attempt. Júbilo Iwata followed after two years of second-tier football. In the playoffs, Avispa Fukuoka survived the final against fourth-placed Cerezo Osaka with a draw and was promoted, putting an end to four years of second-tier wilderness.

At the bottom, Tochigi SC were relegated after 6 years in the second division, while Oita Trinita had the most shocking downfall, being a former J. League Cup winner and having played first-tier football only two seasons before, and losing a test-match series to Machida Zelvia.

Pos	Team	Pld	W	D	L	GF	GA	GD	Pts	Promotion, qualification or relegation
1	Omiya Ardija (C, P)	42	26	8	8	72	37	+35	86	Promotion to 2016 J1 League
2	Júbilo Iwata (P)	42	24	10	8	72	43	+29	82	Promotion to 2016 J1 League
3	Avispa Fukuoka (O, P)	42	24	10	8	63	37	+26	82	Qualification for promotion playoffs (Note: Only teams that meet J1 license criteria can participate in promotion playoffs. If one or more teams fail to meet the criteria, only eligible teams that finished 3rd to 6th will participate and no replacement teams will be added.)
4	Cerezo Osaka	42	18	13	11	57	40	+17	67	Qualification for promotion playoffs
5	Ehime FC	42	19	8	15	47	39	+8	65	Qualification for promotion playoffs
6	V-Varen Nagasaki	42	15	15	12	42	33	+9	60	Qualification for promotion playoffs
7	Giravanz Kitakyushu	42	18	5	19	59	58	+1	59	
8	Tokyo Verdy	42	16	10	16	43	41	+2	58	
9	JEF United Chiba	42	15	12	15	50	45	+5	57	
10	Consadole Sapporo	42	14	15	13	47	43	+4	57	
11	Fagiano Okayama	42	12	18	12	40	35	+5	54	
12	Zweigen Kanazawa	42	12	18	12	46	43	+3	54	
13	Roasso Kumamoto	42	13	14	15	42	45	−3	53	
14	Tokushima Vortis	42	13	14	15	35	44	−9	53	
15	Yokohama FC	42	13	13	16	33	58	−25	52	
16	Kamatamare Sanuki	42	12	15	15	30	33	−3	51	
17	Kyoto Sanga	42	12	14	16	45	51	−6	50	
18	Thespakusatsu Gunma	42	13	9	20	34	56	−22	48	
19	Mito HollyHock	42	10	16	16	40	47	−7	46	
20	FC Gifu	42	12	7	23	37	71	−34	43	
21	Oita Trinita (R)	42	8	14	20	41	51	−10	38	Qualification for relegation playoffs (Note: The playoffs and direct exchange between J2 and J3 are subject to eligibility of J2-licensed teams in top 2 of 2015 J3 League.)
22	Tochigi SC (R)	42	7	14	21	39	64	−25	35	Relegation to 2016 J3 League

Source: Meiji Yasuda J2 League Standing
Rules for classification: 1) Points; 2) Goal difference; 3) Goals scored
(C) Champions; (O) Play-off winners; (P) Promoted; (R) Relegated

== J3 League ==
Only one season after being promoted from the fourth-tier JFL, Renofa Yamaguchi won the third tier at the first attempt. Machida Zelvia settled for second place but won the test match series easily against a crestfallen Oita Trinita.

There was no relegation from this division, but the Japan Football Association folded the U-22 team.

Pos	Team	Pld	W	D	L	GF	GA	GD	Pts	Promotion or relegation
1	Renofa Yamaguchi (C, P)	36	25	3	8	96	36	+60	78	Promotion to 2016 J2 League
2	Machida Zelvia (P)	36	23	9	4	52	18	+34	78	Qualification to J2 League promotion playoffs (Note: Only teams that hold a J2 license are eligible for promotion.)
3	Nagano Parceiro	36	21	7	8	46	28	+18	70	
4	SC Sagamihara	36	17	7	12	59	51	+8	58	
5	Kataller Toyama	36	14	10	12	37	36	+1	52	
6	Gainare Tottori	36	14	8	14	47	41	+6	50	
7	Fukushima United	36	13	10	13	42	48	−6	49	
8	Blaublitz Akita	36	12	9	15	37	40	−3	45	
9	FC Ryukyu	36	12	9	15	45	51	−6	45	
10	Fujieda MYFC	36	11	4	21	37	61	−24	37	
11	Grulla Morioka	36	8	11	17	36	47	−11	35	
12	J.League U-22 Selection (W)	36	7	7	22	28	71	−43	28	Folded by JFA after the season.
13	YSCC Yokohama	36	7	6	23	24	58	−34	27	

Updated to match(es) played on 23 November 2015. Source: JLeague.jp
Rules for classification: 1) Points; 2) Goal difference; 3) Goals scored; 4th) head-to-head results; 5th) disciplinary points; 6th) draw
(C) Champions; (P) Promoted; (W) Withdrawn

== Japan Football League ==
Vanraure Hachinohe won the Apertura title and an entry to the 2015 Emperor's Cup but fell in the Clausura stage to eventual winner Sony Sendai as well as to Kagoshima United, who won fourth-place overall, good enough for promotion to the J3 League.

There was no relegation, but SP Kyoto FC withdrew after the season. They will be replaced by Regional Promotion Series finalists ReinMeer Aomori and Briobecca Urayasu.

Pos	Team	Pld	W	D	L	GF	GA	GD	Pts	Promotion or relegation
1	Sony Sendai (C)	30	21	8	1	48	21	+27	71	
2	Vanraure Hachinohe	30	17	8	5	36	21	+15	59	
3	Honda FC	30	21	5	4	73	22	+51	68	
4	Kagoshima United (P)	30	18	6	6	46	25	+21	60	Promotion to 2016 J3 League
5	Azul Claro Numazu	30	16	6	8	36	28	+8	54	
6	SP Kyoto FC	30	14	8	8	51	26	+25	50	Withdrawn
7	Nara Club	30	13	7	10	33	28	+5	46	
8	FC Osaka	30	13	5	12	45	35	+10	44	
9	Honda Lock	30	11	7	12	31	37	−6	40	
10	Verspah Oita	30	10	7	13	40	47	−7	37	
11	MIO Biwako Shiga	30	9	7	14	36	41	−5	34	
12	Yokogawa Musashino	30	8	6	16	31	40	−9	30	
13	Maruyasu Okazaki	30	6	3	21	27	61	−34	21	
14	Ryutsu Keizai Dragons	30	6	3	21	27	62	−35	21	
15	Fagiano Okayama Next	30	6	2	22	25	59	−34	20	
16	Tochigi Uva	30	5	4	21	29	61	−32	19	

Updated to match(es) played on 15 November 2015. Source: JFL website (in Japanese)
Rules for classification: 1) Points; 2) Goal difference; 3) Goals scored; 4) head-to-head results; 5) disciplinary points; 6) draw
Winners of each stage will be ranked 1st and 2nd based on the championship results regardless of their total points.
(C) Champions; (P) Promoted

== National team (Men) ==
=== Results ===
12 January 2015 AFC Asian Cup	Japan	4–0	Palestine	Newcastle, Australia
18:00 UTC+11	Endo 8'; Okazaki 25'; Honda 43' (pen.); Yoshida 49'	AFC Report		Stadium: Newcastle Stadium; Attendance: 17,147; Referee: Abdulrahman Abdou (Qatar)

16 January 2015 AFC Asian Cup	Iraq	0–1	Japan	Brisbane, Australia
19:00 UTC+10		AFC Report	Honda 23' (pen.)	Stadium: Brisbane Stadium; Attendance: 22,941; Referee: Alireza Faghani (Iran)

20 January 2015 AFC Asian Cup	Japan	2–0	Jordan	Melbourne, Australia
20:00 UTC+11	Honda 24'; Kagawa 82'	AFC Report		Stadium: Melbourne Rectangular Stadium; Attendance: 25,016; Referee: Ravshan Irmatov (Uzbekistan)

23 January 2015 AFC Asian Cup	Japan	1–1 (a.e.t.) (4–5 p)	United Arab Emirates	Sydney, Australia
20:30 UTC+11	Shibasaki 81'	AFC Report	Mabkhout 7'	Stadium: Stadium Australia; Attendance: 19,094; Referee: Alireza Faghani (Iran)
	Penalties
	Honda (penalty missed); Hasebe (penalty scored); Shibasaki (penalty scored); Toyoda (penalty scored); Morishige (penalty scored); Kagawa (penalty missed)		(penalty scored) O. Abdulrahman; (penalty scored) Mabkhout; (penalty missed) Esmaeel; (penalty scored) Hassan; (penalty scored) Fardan; (penalty scored) I. Ahmed

27 March International Friendly	Japan	2–0	Tunisia	Ōita, Japan
19:37 JST	Okazaki 78'; Honda 83'	JFA Report		Stadium: Ōita Bank Dome; Attendance: 34,777; Referee: Ben Williams (Australia)

31 March International Friendly	Japan	5–1	Uzbekistan	Chōfu, Tokyo, Japan
19:26 JST	Aoyama 6'; Okazaki 54'; Shibasaki 80'; Usami 83'; Kawamata 90'	JFA Report	Tukhtakhodjaev 82'	Stadium: Ajinomoto Stadium; Attendance: 46,007; Referee: Strebre Delovski (Australia)

11 June International Friendly	Japan	4–0	Iraq	Yokohama, Japan
19:03 JST	Honda 5'; Makino 9'; Okazaki 32'; Haraguchi 84'	JFA Report		Stadium: Nissan Stadium; Attendance: 63,877; Referee: Daniel Stefański (Poland)

16 June 2018 FIFA World Cup qualification (AFC) round 2	Japan	0–0	Singapore	Saitama, Japan
19:34 JST		JFA Report		Stadium: Saitama Stadium 2002; Attendance: 57,533; Referee: Mohanad Qasim Sarray (Iraq)

2 August 2015 EAFF East Asian Cup	North Korea	2–1	Japan	Wuhan, China
18:20 UTC+8	Ri Hyok-chol 78'; Pak Hyon-il 88'	EAFF Report	Muto 3'	Stadium: Wuhan Sports Center Stadium; Referee: Alireza Faghani (Iran)

5 August 2015 EAFF East Asian Cup	Japan	1–1	South Korea	Wuhan, China
18:20 UTC+8	Yamaguchi 39'	EAFF Report	Jang Hyun-soo 26' (pen.)	Stadium: Wuhan Sports Center Stadium; Referee: Muhammad Taqi Aljaafari (Singapore)

9 August 2015 EAFF East Asian Cup	China	1–1	Japan	Wuhan, China
20:10 UTC+8	Wu Lei 10'	EAFF Report	Muto 41'	Stadium: Wuhan Sports Center Stadium; Referee: Fahad Al-Mirdasi (Saudi Arabia)

3 September 2018 FIFA World Cup qualification (AFC) round 2	Japan	3–0	Cambodia	Saitama, Japan
19:26 JST	Honda 28'; Yoshida 50'; Kagawa 61'	JFA Report		Stadium: Saitama Stadium 2002; Attendance: 54,716; Referee: Kim Hee-gon (South Korea)

8 September 2018 FIFA World Cup qualification (AFC) round 2	Afghanistan	0–6	Japan	Tehran, Iran
16:55 UTC+4:30		FIFA Report	Kagawa 10', 50'; Morishige 35'; Okazaki 57', 60'; Honda 74'	Stadium: Azadi Stadium; Attendance: 8,650; Referee: Khamis Al-Kuwari (Qatar)

8 October 2018 FIFA World Cup qualification (AFC) round 2	Syria	0–3	Japan	Seeb, Oman
17:00 UTC+4:00		AFC Report	Honda 55' (pen.); Okazaki 70'; Usami 88'	Stadium: Seeb Stadium; Attendance: 680; Referee: Ravshan Irmatov (Uzbekistan)

13 October International Friendly	Iran	1–1	Japan	Tehran, Iran
17:00 UTC+4:30	Torabi 45+1'	FIFA Report	Muto 48'	Stadium: Azadi Stadium; Attendance: 15,000; Referee: Yaqoob Abdul Baki (Oman)

12 November 2018 FIFA World Cup qualification (AFC) round 2	Singapore	0–3	Japan	Kallang, Singapore
19:15 UTC+8:00		AFC Report	Kanazaki 20'; Honda 26'; Yoshida 87'	Stadium: National Stadium; Attendance: 33,868; Referee: Fahad Al-Mirdasi (Saudi Arabia)

17 November 2018 FIFA World Cup qualification (AFC) round 2	Cambodia	0–2	Japan	Phnom Penh, Cambodia
19:14 UTC+7:00		AFC Report	Laboravy 52' (o.g.); Honda 90'	Stadium: Olympic Stadium; Attendance: 29,871; Referee: Fu Ming (China)

Win Draw Loss

=== Players statistics ===
Player	-2014	01.12	01.16	01.20	01.23	03.27	03.31	06.11	06.16	08.02	08.05	08.09	09.03	09.08	10.08	10.13	11.12	11.17	2015	Total
Yasuhito Endo	148(14)	O(1)	O	O	O	-	-	-	-	-	-	-	-	-	-	-	-	-	4(1)	152(15)
Shinji Okazaki	85(40)	O(1)	O	O	O	O(1)	O(1)	O(1)	O	-	-	-	O	O(2)	O(1)	O	-	O	13(7)	98(47)
Yasuyuki Konno	84(2)	-	O	-	-	O	O	-	-	-	-	-	-	-	-	-	-	-	3(0)	87(2)
Makoto Hasebe	83(2)	O	O	O	O	O	-	O	O	-	-	-	O	O	O	O	O	-	12(0)	95(2)
Yuto Nagatomo	76(3)	O	O	O	O	-	-	O	-	-	-	-	O	O	O	-	O	O	10(0)	86(3)
Atsuto Uchida	72(2)	-	-	-	-	O	O	-	-	-	-	-	-	-	-	-	-	-	2(0)	74(2)
Keisuke Honda	65(24)	O(1)	O(1)	O(1)	O	O(1)	O	O(1)	O	-	-	-	O(1)	O(1)	O(1)	O	O(1)	O(1)	14(10)	79(34)
Eiji Kawashima	64(0)	O	O	O	O	-	O	O	O	-	-	-	-	-	-	-	-	-	7(0)	71(0)
Shinji Kagawa	63(19)	O	O	O(1)	O	O	O	O	O	-	-	-	O(1)	O(2)	O	O	O	O	14(4)	77(23)
Maya Yoshida	48(3)	O(1)	O	O	O	O	-	O	O	-	-	-	O(1)	O	O	O	O(1)	O	13(3)	61(6)
Hiroshi Kiyotake	26(1)	O	O	O	-	O	-	-	-	-	-	-	-	-	O	O	O	-	7(0)	33(1)
Hiroki Sakai	19(0)	-	-	-	-	O	-	O	O	-	-	-	O	O	-	-	O	-	6(0)	25(0)
Gotoku Sakai	18(0)	O	O	O	O	-	O	-	-	-	-	-	-	-	O	O	-	-	7(0)	25(0)
Masato Morishige	17(1)	O	O	O	O	-	O	-	-	O	O	O	O	O(1)	-	O	O	-	12(1)	29(2)
Hotaru Yamaguchi	15(0)	-	-	-	-	O	-	O	-	O	O(1)	O	O	O	O	-	-	O	9(1)	24(1)
Shusaku Nishikawa	15(0)	-	-	-	-	-	-	-	-	O	O	-	O	O	O	O	O	O	8(0)	23(0)
Takashi Inui	14(2)	O	O	O	O	-	O	-	-	-	-	-	-	-	-	-	-	-	5(0)	19(2)
Tomoaki Makino	14(1)	-	-	-	-	O	-	O(1)	O	O	O	O	-	-	O	-	-	O	8(1)	22(2)
Yuya Osako	12(3)	-	-	-	-	-	O	O	O	-	-	-	-	-	-	-	-	-	3(0)	15(3)
Shinzo Koroki	12(0)	-	-	-	-	-	-	-	-	O	O	O	O	-	-	-	-	-	4(0)	16(0)
Toshihiro Aoyama	7(0)	-	-	-	-	-	O(1)	-	-	-	-	-	-	-	-	-	-	-	1(1)	8(1)
Yoshinori Muto	6(1)	O	O	O	O	O	-	O	O	-	-	-	O	O	O	O(1)	O	-	12(1)	18(2)
Yohei Toyoda	6(1)	O	-	-	O	-	-	-	-	-	-	-	-	-	-	-	-	-	2(0)	8(1)
Hiroki Mizumoto	6(0)	-	-	-	-	-	O	-	-	-	-	-	-	-	-	-	-	-	1(0)	7(0)
Mu Kanazaki	5(0)	-	-	-	-	-	-	-	-	-	-	-	-	-	-	-	O(1)	-	1(1)	6(1)
Gaku Shibasaki	4(1)	-	-	O	O(1)	-	O(1)	O	O	O	O	O	-	-	-	O	-	-	9(2)	13(3)
Kosuke Ota	4(0)	-	-	-	-	-	O	-	O	-	O	-	-	-	-	-	-	-	3(0)	7(0)
Yosuke Kashiwagi	4(0)	-	-	-	-	-	-	-	-	-	-	-	-	-	-	O	O	O	3(0)	7(0)
Genki Haraguchi	3(0)	-	-	-	-	-	-	O(1)	O	-	-	-	O	O	O	O	O	O	8(1)	11(1)
Shuichi Gonda	2(0)	-	-	-	-	O	-	-	-	-	-	-	-	-	-	-	-	-	1(0)	3(0)
Kensuke Nagai	1(0)	-	-	-	-	O	-	O	-	O	O	O	-	-	-	-	-	-	5(0)	6(0)
Takashi Usami	0(0)	-	-	-	-	O	O(1)	O	O	O	O	O	O	O	O(1)	O	O	O	13(2)	13(2)
Kengo Kawamata	0(0)	-	-	-	-	O	O(1)	-	-	O	O	O	-	-	-	-	-	-	5(1)	5(1)
Wataru Endo	0(0)	-	-	-	-	-	-	-	-	O	O	O	-	O	-	-	-	O	5(0)	5(0)
Hiroki Fujiharu	0(0)	-	-	-	-	O	-	-	-	O	-	-	-	-	-	-	-	O	3(0)	3(0)
Takuma Asano	0(0)	-	-	-	-	-	-	-	-	O	O	O	-	-	-	-	-	-	3(0)	3(0)
Yuki Muto	0(0)	-	-	-	-	-	-	-	-	O(1)	-	O(1)	-	-	-	-	-	-	2(2)	2(2)
Shogo Taniguchi	0(0)	-	-	-	-	-	-	O	-	O	-	-	-	-	-	-	-	-	2(0)	2(0)
Daiki Niwa	0(0)	-	-	-	-	-	-	-	-	-	-	O	-	-	-	O	-	-	2(0)	2(0)
Koki Yonekura	0(0)	-	-	-	-	-	-	-	-	-	-	O	-	-	-	O	-	-	2(0)	2(0)
Takumi Minamino	0(0)	-	-	-	-	-	-	-	-	-	-	-	-	-	-	O	-	O	2(0)	2(0)
Gen Shoji	0(0)	-	-	-	-	-	O	-	-	-	-	-	-	-	-	-	-	-	1(0)	1(0)
Naoyuki Fujita	0(0)	-	-	-	-	-	-	-	-	-	O	-	-	-	-	-	-	-	1(0)	1(0)
Shu Kurata	0(0)	-	-	-	-	-	-	-	-	-	O	-	-	-	-	-	-	-	1(0)	1(0)
Masaaki Higashiguchi	0(0)	-	-	-	-	-	-	-	-	-	-	O	-	-	-	-	-	-	1(0)	1(0)

== National team (Women) ==
=== Results ===
2015.03.04	Japan	1–2	Denmark	Portugal
	Ando (?)		? (?) ? (?)

2015.03.06	Japan	3–0	Portugal	Portugal
	Kawamura (?); Yokoyama (?); Sugasawa (?)

2015.03.09	Japan	1–3	France	Portugal
	Kawasumi (?)		? (?) ? (?) ? (?)

2015.03.11	Japan	2–0	Iceland	Portugal
	Miyama (?)

2015.05.24	Japan	1–0	New Zealand	Kagawa, Japan
	Sawa (?)			Stadium: Kagawa Marugame Stadium

2015.05.28	Japan	1–0	Italy	Nagano, Japan
	Ogimi (?)			Stadium: Minami Nagano Sports Park Stadium

2015.06.08	Japan	1–0	Switzerland	Canada
	Miyama (?)

2015.06.12	Japan	2–1	Cameroon	Canada
	Sameshima (?); Sugasawa (?)		? (?)

2015.06.16	Japan	1–0	Ecuador	Canada
	Ogimi (?)

2015.06.23	Japan	2–1	Netherlands	Canada
	Ariyoshi (?); Sakaguchi (?)		? (?)

2015.06.27	Japan	1–0	Australia	Canada
	Iwabuchi (?)

2015.07.01	Japan	2–1	England	Canada
	Miyama (?) (?)		? (?)

2015.07.05	Japan	2–5	United States	Canada
	Ogimi (?) (?)		? (?) ? (?) ? (?) ? (?) ? (?)

2015.08.01	Japan	2–4	North Korea	China
	Masuya (?); Sugita (?)		? (?) ? (?) ? (?) ? (?)

2015.08.04	Japan	1–2	South Korea	China
	Nakajima (?)		? (?) ? (?)

2015.08.08	Japan	2–0	China	China
	Yokoyama (?); Sugita (?)

2015.11.29	Japan	1–3	Netherlands	Netherlands
	Sakaguchi (?)		? (?) ? (?) ? (?)

=== Players statistics ===
Player	-2014	03.04	03.06	03.09	03.11	05.24	05.28	06.08	06.12	06.16	06.23	06.27	07.01	07.05	08.01	08.04	08.08	11.29	2015	Total
Homare Sawa	197(82)	-	-	-	-	O(1)	O	O	O	O	O	O	-	O	-	-	-	-	8(1)	205(83)
Aya Miyama	144(34)	O	-	O	O(2)	O	O	O(1)	O	O	O	O	O(1)	O	-	-	-	O	13(4)	157(38)
Shinobu Ono	125(39)	O	-	O	O	O	O	O	O	O	O	O	O	O	-	-	-	-	12(0)	137(39)
Kozue Ando	119(18)	O(1)	O	O	O	O	O	O	-	-	-	-	-	-	-	-	-	-	7(1)	126(19)
Yuki Ogimi	112(52)	O	-	O	O	O	O(1)	O	O	O(1)	O	O	O	O(1)	-	-	-	O	13(3)	125(55)
Azusa Iwashimizu	109(11)	O	-	-	O	O	O	O	O	-	O	O	O	O	-	-	-	-	10(0)	119(11)
Yukari Kinga	92(5)	O	-	O	-	O	O	-	O	-	-	-	-	-	-	-	-	-	5(0)	97(5)
Mizuho Sakaguchi	85(26)	O	O	O	O	-	O	O	O	-	O(1)	O	O	O	-	-	-	O(1)	12(2)	97(28)
Miho Fukumoto	75(0)	-	O	-	O	-	O	-	-	O	-	-	-	-	-	-	-	-	4(0)	79(0)
Rumi Utsugi	74(5)	O	O	O	O	O	O	O	O	-	O	O	O	O	-	-	-	O	13(0)	87(5)
Nahomi Kawasumi	67(18)	O	O	O(1)	-	O	O	O	O	-	O	O	O	O	-	-	-	-	11(1)	78(19)
Saki Kumagai	63(0)	O	-	O	-	O	O	O	O	-	O	O	O	O	-	-	-	O	11(0)	74(0)
Aya Sameshima	57(3)	O	-	O	O	O	O	-	O(1)	O	O	O	O	O	-	-	-	O	12(1)	69(4)
Megumi Takase	52(9)	O	O	O	O	-	-	-	-	-	-	-	-	-	O	-	O	-	6(0)	58(9)
Ayumi Kaihori	46(0)	-	-	O	-	-	O	-	O	-	O	O	O	O	-	-	-	-	7(0)	53(0)
Asuna Tanaka	30(3)	-	O	O	O	-	-	-	-	O	-	-	-	-	-	O	O	-	6(0)	36(3)
Saori Ariyoshi	30(0)	O	O	O	O	-	O	O	-	O	O(1)	O	O	O	-	-	-	O	12(1)	42(1)
Megumi Kamionobe	27(2)	-	O	-	O	-	-	-	O	O	-	-	-	-	O	-	-	-	5(0)	32(2)
Mana Iwabuchi	25(3)	-	-	-	-	-	-	-	-	O	O	O(1)	O	O	-	-	-	-	5(1)	30(4)
Yuika Sugasawa	24(8)	O	O(1)	O	O	O	O	O	O(1)	O	-	-	-	O	O	O	O	O	14(2)	38(10)
Emi Nakajima	21(5)	-	-	-	-	-	-	-	-	-	-	-	-	-	-	O(1)	O	O	3(1)	24(6)
Kana Osafune	14(2)	-	-	-	-	-	-	-	-	-	-	-	-	-	-	-	-	O	1(0)	15(2)
Erina Yamane	13(0)	O	-	-	-	O	-	O	-	-	-	-	-	-	O	-	-	O	5(0)	18(0)
Yuri Kawamura	11(1)	-	O(1)	O	-	O	O	O	-	O	-	-	-	-	O	O	O	O	10(1)	21(2)
Rika Masuya	7(2)	-	-	-	-	-	-	-	-	-	-	-	-	-	O(1)	-	O	O	3(1)	10(3)
Asano Nagasato	7(1)	O	O	-	O	-	-	-	-	O	-	-	-	-	-	-	-	-	4(0)	11(1)
Kana Kitahara	7(0)	-	-	-	-	-	-	-	-	O	-	-	-	-	O	-	-	-	2(0)	9(0)
Hikaru Naomoto	6(0)	-	-	-	-	-	-	-	-	-	-	-	-	-	O	O	-	-	2(0)	8(0)
Mina Tanaka	4(1)	-	-	-	-	-	-	-	-	-	-	-	-	-	-	O	O	-	2(0)	6(1)
Mai Kyokawa	2(0)	-	-	-	-	-	-	-	-	-	-	-	-	-	O	O	O	-	3(0)	5(0)
Saori Arimachi	1(0)	-	-	-	-	-	-	-	-	-	-	-	-	-	O	O	O	O	4(0)	5(0)
Ami Sugita	1(0)	-	-	-	-	-	-	-	-	-	-	-	-	-	O(1)	-	O(1)	O	3(2)	4(2)
Yumi Uetsuji	1(0)	-	O	-	O	-	-	-	-	-	-	-	-	-	-	O	-	-	3(0)	4(0)
Ryoko Takara	1(0)	-	-	-	-	-	-	-	-	-	-	-	-	-	O	-	O	-	2(0)	3(0)
Shiho Kohata	1(0)	-	-	-	-	-	-	-	-	-	-	-	-	-	O	-	-	-	1(0)	2(0)
Rie Azami	1(0)	-	-	-	-	-	-	-	-	-	-	-	-	-	-	O	-	-	1(0)	2(0)
Kumi Yokoyama	0(0)	-	O(1)	-	-	-	-	-	-	-	-	-	-	-	O	O	O(1)	O	5(2)	5(2)
Ayaka Yamashita	0(0)	-	-	-	-	-	-	-	-	-	-	-	-	-	-	O	O	O	3(0)	3(0)
Tomoko Muramatsu	0(0)	-	-	-	-	-	-	-	-	-	-	-	-	-	-	O	O	-	2(0)	2(0)
Hanae Shibata	0(0)	-	-	-	-	-	-	-	-	-	-	-	-	-	-	O	-	-	1(0)	1(0)

== Deaths ==
- 15 April: Tadahiko Ueda (born 1947)
