= List of Japan women's international footballers =

This is a list of Japan women's international footballers – Japanese association football players who have played for the Japan women's national football team as recorded by the Japan Football Association.

== Players ==
Last updated : March 16, 2020
| Player | Games | Goals | First Game | Last Game |
|---|---|---|---|---|
| Mana Iwabuchi | 72 | 29 | 2010.02.06 | 2020.03.11 |
| Emi Nakajima | 78 | 14 | 2011.05.14 | 2019.12.17 |
| Saki Kumagai | 110 | 1 | 2008.03.07 | 2019.11.10 |
| Yuika Sugasawa | 69 | 20 | 2010.01.13 | 2019.11.10 |
| Aya Sameshima | 113 | 5 | 2008.03.10 | 2019.06.25 |
| Kumi Yokoyama | 43 | 17 | 2015.03.06 | 2019.06.19 |
| Kiko Seike | 2 | 1 | 2019.12.11 | 2019.12.17 |
| Asato Miyagawa | 9 | 0 | 2019.03.02 | 2019.12.17 |
| Moeka Minami | 10 | 0 | 2019.03.02 | 2019.12.17 |
| Mayu Ikejiri | 6 | 2 | 2019.02.27 | 2019.12.17 |
| Jun Endo | 12 | 0 | 2019.02.27 | 2019.12.17 |
| Rikako Kobayashi | 12 | 4 | 2019.02.27 | 2019.12.17 |
| Hina Sugita | 15 | 0 | 2018.08.02 | 2019.12.17 |
| Narumi Miura | 17 | 0 | 2018.06.10 | 2019.12.17 |
| Mami Ueno | 6 | 0 | 2017.04.09 | 2019.12.17 |
| Yuka Momiki | 30 | 10 | 2017.03.01 | 2019.12.17 |
| Ayaka Yamashita | 35 | 0 | 2015.08.04 | 2019.12.17 |
| Shiori Miyake | 21 | 0 | 2013.09.22 | 2019.12.17 |
| Mina Tanaka | 39 | 16 | 2013.03.08 | 2019.12.17 |
| Arisa Matsubara | 4 | 1 | 2019.02.27 | 2019.12.14 |
| Risa Shimizu | 31 | 0 | 2018.02.28 | 2019.12.14 |
| Yui Hasegawa | 42 | 8 | 2017.03.01 | 2019.12.14 |
| Honoka Hayashi | 1 | 0 | 2019.12.11 | 2019.12.11 |
| Akari Kurishima | 1 | 0 | 2019.12.11 | 2019.12.11 |
| Sakiko Ikeda | 15 | 0 | 2017.03.06 | 2019.12.11 |
| Riko Ueki | 3 | 0 | 2019.04.04 | 2019.11.10 |
| Mayo Doko | 2 | 0 | 2018.07.29 | 2019.11.10 |
| Hikaru Naomoto | 20 | 0 | 2014.05.08 | 2019.11.10 |
| Hana Takahashi | 1 | 0 | 2019.10.06 | 2019.10.06 |
| Saori Takarada | 3 | 0 | 2019.06.10 | 2019.06.25 |
| Nana Ichise | 19 | 0 | 2017.04.09 | 2019.06.25 |
| Rumi Utsugi | 113 | 6 | 2005.05.21 | 2019.06.02 |
| Chika Hirao | 2 | 0 | 2018.08.02 | 2019.04.09 |
| Hinata Miyazawa | 2 | 0 | 2018.11.11 | 2019.04.04 |
| Risako Oga | 3 | 0 | 2019.02.27 | 2019.03.05 |
| Moeno Sakaguchi | 12 | 1 | 2018.06.10 | 2019.03.05 |
| Erina Yamane | 26 | 0 | 2010.01.15 | 2019.03.05 |
| Saori Ariyoshi | 65 | 1 | 2012.02.29 | 2019.03.02 |
| Fuka Nagano | 1 | 0 | 2018.11.11 | 2018.11.11 |
| Rin Sumida | 22 | 0 | 2017.04.09 | 2018.08.31 |
| Yu Nakasato | 20 | 0 | 2016.06.02 | 2018.08.28 |
| Aimi Kunitake | 3 | 0 | 2018.07.29 | 2018.08.28 |
| Rika Masuya | 27 | 6 | 2014.09.13 | 2018.08.25 |
| Hikari Takagi | 19 | 1 | 2016.06.05 | 2018.08.21 |
| Nahomi Kawasumi | 90 | 20 | 2008.05.31 | 2018.08.02 |
| Mizuho Sakaguchi | 124 | 29 | 2006.07.19 | 2018.04.20 |
| Ayumi Oya | 9 | 0 | 2017.04.09 | 2018.03.02 |
| Madoka Haji | 7 | 0 | 2017.07.30 | 2018.02.28 |
| Miho Manya | 7 | 0 | 2017.07.27 | 2017.12.11 |
| Shiho Tomari | 2 | 0 | 2017.07.27 | 2017.08.03 |
| Hikaru Kitagawa | 5 | 0 | 2017.03.01 | 2017.08.03 |
| Riho Sakamoto | 1 | 0 | 2017.07.30 | 2017.07.30 |
| Mayu Sasaki | 8 | 0 | 2016.06.02 | 2017.06.13 |
| Ami Sugita | 6 | 2 | 2014.05.18 | 2017.06.13 |
| Kaede Nakamura | 3 | 0 | 2017.03.03 | 2017.03.08 |
| Yuri Kawamura | 32 | 2 | 2010.01.13 | 2017.03.08 |
| Sonoko Chiba | 5 | 0 | 2016.06.02 | 2017.03.06 |
| Tomoko Muramatsu | 4 | 0 | 2015.08.04 | 2016.07.21 |
| Saori Arimachi | 6 | 0 | 2013.09.22 | 2016.07.21 |
| Yuki Nagasato | 132 | 58 | 2004.04.22 | 2016.07.21 |
| Megumi Takase | 61 | 9 | 2010.01.15 | 2016.03.09 |
| Azusa Iwashimizu | 122 | 11 | 2006.02.18 | 2016.03.09 |
| Yukari Kinga | 100 | 5 | 2005.03.29 | 2016.03.09 |
| Aya Miyama | 162 | 38 | 2003.03.19 | 2016.03.09 |
| Asuna Tanaka | 39 | 3 | 2011.03.04 | 2016.03.07 |
| Megumi Kamionobe | 34 | 2 | 2009.08.01 | 2016.03.07 |
| Shinobu Ono | 139 | 40 | 2003.01.12 | 2016.03.07 |
| Miho Fukumoto | 81 | 0 | 2002.10.04 | 2016.03.04 |
| Kana Osafune | 15 | 2 | 2010.01.13 | 2015.11.29 |
| Ryoko Takara | 3 | 0 | 2013.09.22 | 2015.08.08 |
| Mai Kyokawa | 5 | 0 | 2012.02.29 | 2015.08.08 |
| Hanae Shibata | 1 | 0 | 2015.08.04 | 2015.08.04 |
| Rie Azami | 2 | 0 | 2013.09.26 | 2015.08.04 |
| Yumi Uetsuji | 4 | 0 | 2012.04.05 | 2015.08.04 |
| Shiho Kohata | 2 | 0 | 2014.05.18 | 2015.08.01 |
| Kana Kitahara | 9 | 0 | 2013.09.22 | 2015.08.01 |
| Ayumi Kaihori | 53 | 0 | 2008.05.31 | 2015.07.05 |
| Homare Sawa | 205 | 83 | 1993.12.06 | 2015.07.05 |
| Asano Nagasato | 11 | 1 | 2009.07.29 | 2015.06.16 |
| Kozue Ando | 126 | 19 | 1999.06.26 | 2015.06.08 |
| Rie Usui | 6 | 0 | 2014.09.13 | 2014.10.01 |
| Chinatsu Kira | 12 | 5 | 2014.05.08 | 2014.10.01 |
| Hisui Haza | 4 | 0 | 2014.09.13 | 2014.09.29 |
| Nanase Kiryu | 16 | 3 | 2010.01.13 | 2014.09.26 |
| Michi Goto | 7 | 2 | 2008.03.07 | 2014.05.25 |
| Yuria Obara | 1 | 0 | 2014.05.18 | 2014.05.18 |
| Ruka Norimatsu | 2 | 0 | 2014.05.08 | 2014.05.18 |
| Karina Maruyama | 79 | 14 | 2002.10.02 | 2014.05.16 |
| Hikari Nakade | 1 | 0 | 2013.09.26 | 2013.09.26 |
| Saki Ueno | 1 | 0 | 2013.09.26 | 2013.09.26 |
| Yoko Tanaka | 4 | 0 | 2013.03.06 | 2013.09.22 |
| Manami Nakano | 12 | 2 | 2010.01.13 | 2013.09.22 |
| Marumi Yamazaki | 4 | 0 | 2013.03.06 | 2013.07.25 |
| Mari Kawamura | 2 | 0 | 2013.03.06 | 2013.03.13 |
| Shiho Ogawa | 3 | 0 | 2013.03.06 | 2013.03.13 |
| Yuka Kado | 3 | 0 | 2013.03.06 | 2013.03.13 |
| Ami Otaki | 3 | 0 | 2012.06.20 | 2013.03.13 |
| Fubuki Kuno | 1 | 0 | 2013.03.06 | 2013.03.06 |
| Kyoko Yano | 74 | 1 | 2003.06.11 | 2012.07.31 |
| Kanako Ito | 13 | 3 | 2001.08.05 | 2012.03.05 |
| Maiko Nasu | 3 | 0 | 2009.08.01 | 2011.05.18 |
| Yuki Sakai | 1 | 0 | 2011.03.09 | 2011.03.09 |
| Akane Saito | 1 | 0 | 2011.03.09 | 2011.03.09 |
| Eriko Arakawa | 72 | 20 | 2000.06.10 | 2011.03.09 |
| Nozomi Yamago | 96 | 0 | 1997.06.15 | 2011.03.09 |
| Mami Yamaguchi | 18 | 8 | 2007.07.28 | 2011.03.07 |
| Ayako Kitamoto | 17 | 4 | 2004.06.06 | 2010.11.22 |
| Akiko Sudo | 15 | 3 | 2003.01.12 | 2010.05.27 |
| Chiaki Minamiyama | 4 | 2 | 2010.05.08 | 2010.05.24 |
| Nayuha Toyoda | 22 | 0 | 2004.12.18 | 2010.05.22 |
| Yuiko Konno | 1 | 0 | 2010.05.11 | 2010.05.11 |
| Asako Ideue | 1 | 0 | 2010.05.11 | 2010.05.11 |
| Sawako Yasumoto | 2 | 0 | 2010.05.08 | 2010.05.11 |
| Natsuko Hara | 2 | 0 | 2010.01.13 | 2010.01.15 |
| Miwa Yonetsu | 2 | 0 | 2009.07.29 | 2009.11.14 |
| Yuka Miyazaki | 18 | 2 | 2001.08.05 | 2009.08.01 |
| Ayumi Hara | 42 | 2 | 1998.05.17 | 2008.08.21 |
| Hiromi Ikeda | 119 | 4 | 1997.06.08 | 2008.08.21 |
| Miyuki Yanagita | 91 | 11 | 1997.12.05 | 2008.08.15 |
| Tomoe Kato | 114 | 8 | 1997.06.08 | 2008.08.12 |
| Aya Shimokozuru | 28 | 0 | 2004.04.18 | 2008.05.31 |
| Eriko Sato | 2 | 0 | 2003.07.27 | 2008.03.10 |
| Mai Nakachi | 30 | 0 | 1997.12.05 | 2008.02.21 |
| Tomomi Miyamoto | 77 | 13 | 1997.06.08 | 2007.09.17 |
| Mio Otani | 73 | 31 | 2000.05.31 | 2007.09.02 |
| Maiko Nakaoka | 14 | 0 | 2005.05.21 | 2007.02.14 |
| Nao Shikata | 8 | 0 | 2001.12.04 | 2006.07.21 |
| Yasuyo Yamagishi | 60 | 6 | 1998.12.08 | 2005.05.28 |
| Naoko Kawakami | 48 | 0 | 2001.03.16 | 2005.05.26 |
| Saiko Takahashi | 2 | 0 | 2005.03.29 | 2005.05.21 |
| Natsumi Hara | 1 | 0 | 2005.03.29 | 2005.03.29 |
| Tomoko Suzuki | 3 | 2 | 2003.01.12 | 2005.03.26 |
| Emi Yamamoto | 22 | 4 | 2003.01.12 | 2004.08.20 |
| Yayoi Kobayashi | 54 | 12 | 1999.03.24 | 2004.08.14 |
| Shiho Onodera | 23 | 0 | 1995.09.22 | 2004.08.06 |
| Yumi Obe | 85 | 6 | 1991.08.21 | 2004.08.06 |
| Akiko Niwata | 1 | 0 | 2003.03.19 | 2003.03.19 |
| Hiroko Sano | 1 | 0 | 2003.03.19 | 2003.03.19 |
| Mai Aizawa | 5 | 4 | 1999.11.12 | 2002.10.11 |
| Mito Isaka | 46 | 15 | 1997.06.15 | 2002.10.11 |
| Yoshie Kasajima | 24 | 4 | 1999.11.08 | 2002.10.02 |
| Harue Sato | 17 | 4 | 2000.05.31 | 2002.08.31 |
| Tomomi Fujimura | 20 | 1 | 1997.06.15 | 2002.04.09 |
| Noriko Baba | 5 | 0 | 2001.08.03 | 2002.04.03 |
| Rie Kimura | 21 | 0 | 1996.05.16 | 2001.12.16 |
| Yuki Tsuchihashi | 4 | 0 | 2001.08.05 | 2001.12.14 |
| Kazumi Kishi | 9 | 2 | 1998.05.21 | 2001.08.08 |
| Yuka Yamazaki | 7 | 0 | 2000.05.31 | 2001.03.16 |
| Megumi Torigoe | 8 | 0 | 1999.11.08 | 2001.03.16 |
| Megumi Ogawa | 1 | 0 | 2000.12.17 | 2000.12.17 |
| Kae Nishina | 46 | 2 | 1995.05.05 | 2000.06.10 |
| Nami Otake | 46 | 29 | 1994.08.20 | 1999.11.21 |
| Tamaki Uchiyama | 58 | 26 | 1991.05.26 | 1999.11.21 |
| Asako Takakura | 79 | 29 | 1984.10.17 | 1999.11.21 |
| Shoko Mikami | 3 | 2 | 1999.11.12 | 1999.11.19 |
| Mari Miyamoto | 1 | 0 | 1999.11.12 | 1999.11.12 |
| Yumi Tomei | 43 | 6 | 1993.12.06 | 1999.06.26 |
| Rie Yamaki | 50 | 3 | 1993.12.04 | 1999.06.26 |
| Naoko Nishigai | 2 | 0 | 1999.05.02 | 1999.06.03 |
| Kaoru Nagadome | 4 | 0 | 1997.06.15 | 1999.06.03 |
| Mayumi Omatsu | 12 | 1 | 1997.06.08 | 1999.05.30 |
| Miki Sugawara | 7 | 2 | 1998.05.17 | 1998.12.12 |
| Yuko Morimoto | 10 | 2 | 1993.12.06 | 1998.05.24 |
| Yumi Umeoka | 4 | 0 | 1997.06.15 | 1998.05.21 |
| Maki Haneta | 30 | 1 | 1993.12.04 | 1997.06.15 |
| Junko Ozawa | 21 | 0 | 1993.12.04 | 1997.06.08 |
| Miyuki Izumi | 5 | 0 | 1996.05.16 | 1996.07.25 |
| Kaoru Kadohara | 12 | 1 | 1993.12.04 | 1996.07.25 |
| Akemi Noda | 76 | 24 | 1984.10.17 | 1996.07.25 |
| Futaba Kioka | 75 | 30 | 1981.06.07 | 1996.07.25 |
| Etsuko Handa | 75 | 19 | 1981.06.07 | 1996.07.21 |
| Ryoko Uno | 6 | 0 | 1991.06.03 | 1996.05.18 |
| Kaori Nagamine | 64 | 48 | 1984.10.22 | 1996.05.18 |
| Megumi Sakata | 10 | 0 | 1989.12.24 | 1996.05.16 |
| Inesu Emiko Takeoka | 3 | 3 | 1994.08.21 | 1995.09.27 |
| Tsuru Morimoto | 5 | 1 | 1994.08.21 | 1995.09.25 |
| Kyoko Kuroda | 21 | 7 | 1989.01.12 | 1994.10.12 |
| Etsuko Tahara | 1 | 0 | 1994.08.21 | 1994.08.21 |
| Minako Takashima | 1 | 0 | 1994.08.21 | 1994.08.21 |
| Yuki Fushimi | 1 | 0 | 1994.08.21 | 1994.08.21 |
| Terumi Nagae | 1 | 0 | 1994.08.21 | 1994.08.21 |
| Yuriko Mizuma | 22 | 10 | 1990.09.09 | 1994.08.21 |
| Sayuri Yamaguchi | 29 | 1 | 1981.09.06 | 1993.12.06 |
| Takako Tezuka | 41 | 19 | 1986.03.07 | 1991.11.21 |
| Masae Suzuki | 45 | 0 | 1984.10.24 | 1991.11.21 |
| Michiko Matsuda | 45 | 10 | 1981.09.06 | 1991.11.21 |
| Mayumi Kaji | 48 | 0 | 1981.09.06 | 1991.11.21 |
| Midori Honda | 43 | 0 | 1981.06.07 | 1991.11.21 |
| Tomoko Matsunaga | 13 | 0 | 1988.06.01 | 1991.06.08 |
| Yoko Takahagi | 31 | 0 | 1986.01.21 | 1991.06.08 |
| Noriko Ishibashi | 3 | 1 | 1989.12.24 | 1991.06.03 |
| Yumi Watanabe | 19 | 2 | 1988.06.01 | 1991.04.05 |
| Kazuko Hironaka | 21 | 3 | 1984.10.17 | 1990.09.29 |
| Chiaki Yamada | 21 | 3 | 1984.10.17 | 1989.12.29 |
| Taeko Kawasumi | 2 | 0 | 1988.06.03 | 1988.06.05 |
| Akiko Hayakawa | 2 | 0 | 1987.08.04 | 1988.06.05 |
| Yuko Oita | 3 | 0 | 1986.01.21 | 1987.12.15 |
| Shoko Hamada | 2 | 0 | 1986.01.21 | 1986.03.07 |
| Kimiko Shiratori | 5 | 0 | 1984.10.17 | 1986.03.07 |
| Tomomi Seo | 1 | 0 | 1986.01.21 | 1986.01.21 |
| Mami Kaneda | 3 | 0 | 1984.10.22 | 1986.01.21 |
| Keiko Saito | 3 | 0 | 1984.10.17 | 1984.10.24 |
| Emiko Kubo | 4 | 0 | 1981.09.06 | 1984.10.24 |
| Kaoru Kakinami | 4 | 0 | 1981.09.06 | 1984.10.24 |
| Masako Yoshida | 1 | 0 | 1981.09.09 | 1981.09.09 |
| Tomoko Ohara | 1 | 0 | 1981.09.09 | 1981.09.09 |
| Sanae Mishima | 2 | 0 | 1981.06.11 | 1981.09.09 |
| Akemi Iwata | 3 | 0 | 1981.06.11 | 1981.09.09 |
| Chieko Hase | 3 | 0 | 1981.06.07 | 1981.09.09 |
| Shiho Kaneda | 4 | 0 | 1981.06.07 | 1981.09.09 |
| Yuriko Shima | 4 | 0 | 1981.06.07 | 1981.09.09 |
| Nobuko Kondo | 4 | 0 | 1981.06.07 | 1981.09.09 |
| Miho Kaneda | 5 | 0 | 1981.06.07 | 1981.09.09 |
| Nobuko Jashima | 1 | 0 | 1981.09.06 | 1981.09.06 |
| Mihoko Iwaya | 2 | 0 | 1981.06.13 | 1981.09.06 |
| Junko Ishida | 3 | 0 | 1981.06.07 | 1981.09.06 |
| Maho Shimizu | 3 | 0 | 1981.06.07 | 1981.09.06 |
| Masuyo Shiraishi | 4 | 0 | 1981.06.07 | 1981.09.06 |
| Chieko Homma | 3 | 0 | 1981.06.07 | 1981.06.13 |

== See also ==
Japan
Women's

- International footballers
- National football team (Results)
- National under-20 football team
- National under-17 football team
- National futsal team

Men's

- International footballers
- National football team (Results (2020–present))
- National under-23 football team
- National under-20 football team
- National under-17 football team
- National futsal team
- National under-20 futsal team
- National beach soccer team
