= List of INAC Kobe Leonessa seasons =

This is a list of seasons played by INAC Kobe Leonessa, a Japanese women's football club from Kobe competing in the Japan Women's Football League's premier championship, which has won in three occasions. Leonessa was created in 2001 and plays in the Noevir Stadium Kobe.

Champions	Runners-up	Promoted	Relegated

== Summary ==
Domestic and international results of INAC Kobe Leonessa
Season	League										Empress's Cup	League Cup	League top scorers					
Season	Tier	Division	Pos	P	W	D	L	F	A	Pts	Empress's Cup	League Cup	1st	Goal	2nd	Goal	3rd	Goal
2002	4	Kansai Division 3	1															
2003	3	Kansai Division 2	1															
2004	3	Kansai Division 1	1								R2							
2005	2	Division 2	1	18	16	1	1	87	16	49	QF							
2006	1	Nadeshiko League Division 1	5	17	4	4	9	25	37	16	QF							
2007	1	Nadeshiko League Division 1	4	21	10	1	10	37	25	31	SF	SF						
2008	1	Nadeshiko League Division 1	2	21	14	3	4	56	26	45	RU							
2009	1	Nadeshiko League Division 1	4	21	11	4	6	49	25	37	SF							
2010	1	Nadeshiko League	4	18	11	1	6	32	22	34	W	SF						
2011	1	Nadeshiko League	1	16	13	3	0	49	8	42	W		(Japan) **Kawasumi**	12	(Japan) **Ohno**	12		
2012	1	Nadeshiko League	1	18	17	1	0	69	12	52	W	RU	(Japan) **Takase**	20	(Japan) Ohno	12	(Japan) Kawasumi	8
2013	1	Nadeshiko League	1	18	16	0	2	62	13	48	W	W	(United States) **Goebel**	15	(Japan) Kawasumi	12	(South Korea) Ji	9
2014	1	Nadeshiko League	6	28	10	7	11	44	33	37	QF		(Japan) Takase	19				
2015	1	Nadeshiko League Division 1	3	23	14	5	4	42	25	47	W							
2016	1	Nadeshiko League Division 1	2	18	12	1	5	40	19	37	W	GS	(Japan) Ohno	7	(Japan) Kyokawa	6	(Japan) Nakajima	5
2017	1	Nadeshiko League Division 1	2	18	12	3	3	31	12	39	R3	GS	(Japan) Nakajima	8	(Japan) Takase	5	(Japan) Ohno	4

Overall championship top scorers are marked in bold.
