= 2010 Nadeshiko League Cup final =

Nippon TV Beleza	Urawa Reds Ladies
3	2
- Date: August 22, 2010
- Venue: Nishigaoka Soccer Stadium, Tokyo

2010 Nadeshiko League Cup final was the 6th final of the Nadeshiko League Cup competition. The final was played at Nishigaoka Soccer Stadium in Tokyo on August 22, 2010. Nippon TV Beleza won the championship.

== Overview ==
Nippon TV Beleza won their 2nd title, by defeating Urawa Reds Ladies 3–2 with Shinobu Ono, Kanako Ito and Mana Iwabuchi goal.

== Match details ==
August 22, 2010

Nippon TV Beleza	3-2	Urawa Reds Ladies
Shinobu Ono 60'; Kanako Ito 87'; Mana Iwabuchi 90'	Report	Akiko Niwata 55' ? 62'

Nishigaoka Soccer Stadium

== See also ==
- 2010 Nadeshiko League Cup
