= Michi Goto =

Japanese footballer

Michi Goto 後藤 三知
Personal information
- Full name: Michi Goto
- Date of birth: 27 July 1990 (age 36)
- Place of birth: Suzuka, Mie, Japan
- Height: 1.64 m (5 ft 4 1/2 in)
- Position: Forward

Team information
- Current team: MyNavi Sendai Ladies
- Number: 11

Youth career
- 2006–2008: Tokiwagi Gakuen High School LSC

Senior career*
Years	Team	Apps	(Gls)
2009–2016	Urawa Reds	140	(28)
2017–2018	Real Sociedad	17	(1)
2018–2019	Eibar		
2019-2021.1	Córdoba		
2021.1-2021.5	Alhama CF		
2021.6-2022.6	INAC Kobe Leonessa	0	(0)
2022.6-	MyNavi Sendai Ladies		

International career
2008–2010	Japan U-20	5	(1)
2008–2014	Japan	7	(2)
Medal record
Urawa Reds
Winner	Nadeshiko League	2009
Winner	Nadeshiko League	2014
Runner-up	Nadeshiko League	2010
Runner-up	Nadeshiko League Cup	2010
Runner-up	Empress's Cup	2009
Runner-up	Empress's Cup	2010
Runner-up	Empress's Cup	2014
Representing Japan
AFC Women's Asian Cup
Gold medal – first place	2014 Vietnam
Bronze medal – third place	2008 Vietnam
AFC U-19 Women's Championship
Gold medal – first place	2009 China
Silver medal – second place	2007 China
- * Club domestic league appearances and goals

Michi Goto (後藤 三知, Gotō Michi; born 27 July 1990) is a Japanese footballer who plays as a forward. She plays for MyNavi Sendai Ladies. She has also played for the Japan national team.

== Club career ==
Goto was born in Suzuka on 27 July 1990. After graduating from high school, she joined Urawa Reds in 2009. The club won the L.League championship in 2009 and 2014. She was also selected for the MVP awards in 2014. She left the club at the end of the 2016 season. She played 140 matches and scored 28 goals in L.League. In July 2017, she joined Spanish Primera División club Real Sociedad. In July 2018, she moved to the Primera Nacional club Eibar. In July 2019, she moved to Segunda División Pro club Córdoba.

== National team career ==
On 7 March 2008, when Goto was 17 years old, she debuted for the Japan national team against Canada. In November, she was selected Japan U-20 national team for 2008 U-20 World Cup. She was also a member for 2010 U-20 World Cup. In September 2013, she was selected Japan national team again. She played at 2014 Asian Cup and Japan won the championship. She played 7 games and scored 2 goals for Japan until 2014.

== National team statistics ==
Japan national team
Year	Apps	Goals
2008	2	2
2009	0	0
2010	0	0
2011	0	031 May 2008
2012	0	0
2013	1	0
2014	4	0
Total	7	2

== International goals ==
No.	Date	Venue	Opponent	Score	Result	Competition
1.	31 May 2008	Thống Nhất Stadium, Ho Chi Minh City, Vietnam	Chinese Taipei	7–0	11–0	2008 AFC Women's Asian Cup
