= Rumi Utsugi =

Japanese footballer (born 1988)

Rumi Utsugi 宇津木 瑠美
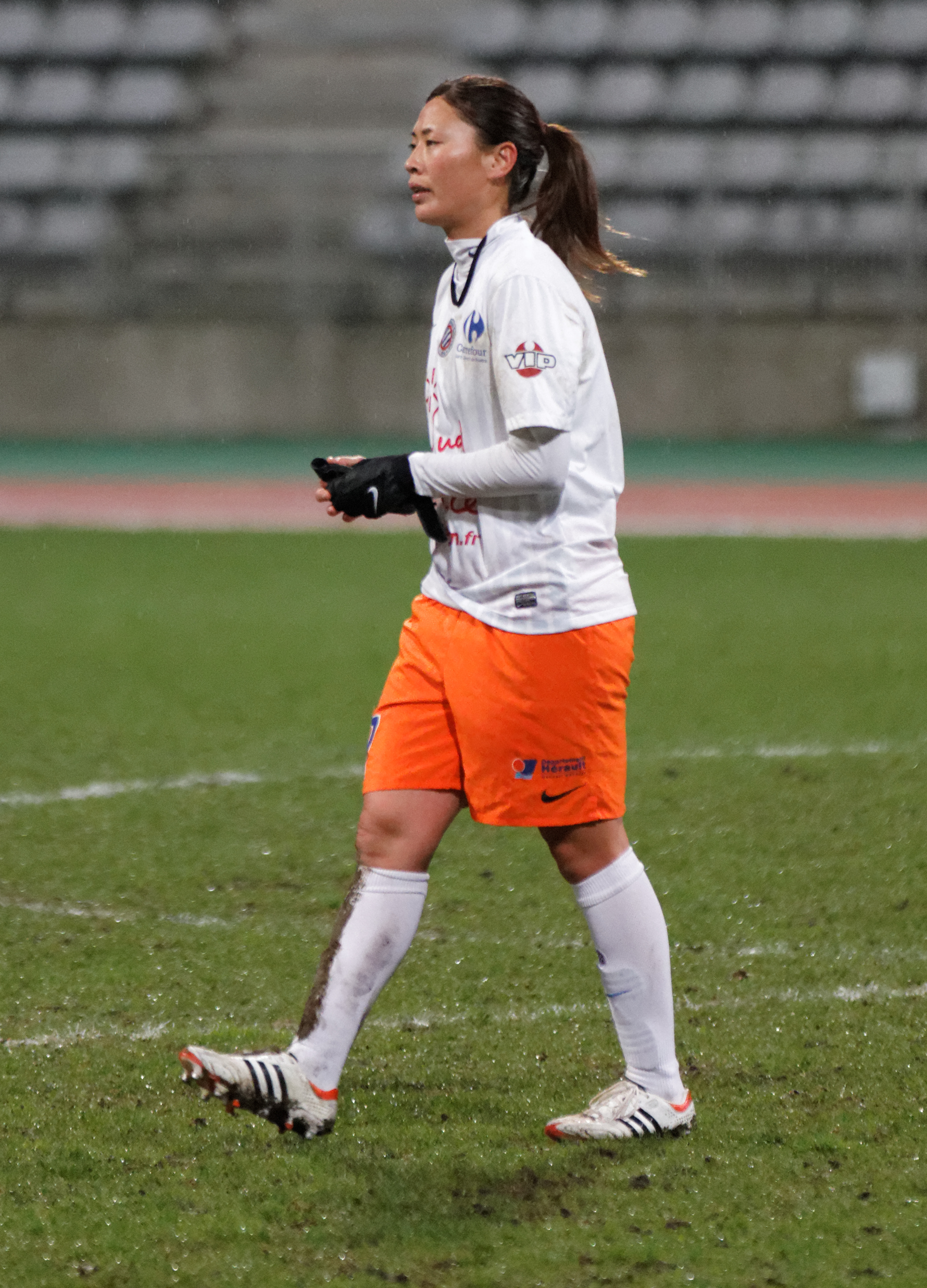
- Rumi Utsugi during PSG-Montpellier (season 2012–2013)

Personal information
- Full name: Rumi Utsugi
- Date of birth: 5 December 1988 (age 37)
- Place of birth: Kawasaki, Japan
- Height: 1.68 m (5 ft 6 in)
- Position: Defensive midfielder

Team information
- Current team: Tokyo Verdy Beleza
- Number: 30

Youth career
- 1995–1999: Kawasaki Wings
- 1999–2000: Kawasaki Frontale
- 2000–2002: Nippon TV Menina
- 2002–2004: Nippon TV Beleza

Senior career*
Years	Team	Apps	(Gls)
2004–2010	Nippon TV Beleza	76	(7)
2010–2016	Montpellier	111	(20)
2016–2019	Reign FC	48	(3)
2021–	Tokyo Verdy Beleza	3	(0)

International career^{‡}
2008	Japan U-20	4	(1)
2005–2019	Japan	113	(6)
Medal record
Nippon TV Beleza
Winner	Nadeshiko League	2005
Winner	Nadeshiko League	2006
Winner	Nadeshiko League	2007
Winner	Nadeshiko League	2008
Winner	Nadeshiko League	2010
Runner-up	Nadeshiko League	2004
Runner-up	Nadeshiko League	2009
Winner	Nadeshiko League Cup	2007
Winner	Nadeshiko League Cup	2010
Winner	Empress's Cup	2004
Winner	Empress's Cup	2005
Winner	Empress's Cup	2007
Winner	Empress's Cup	2008
Winner	Empress's Cup	2009
Representing Japan
FIFA Women's World Cup
Gold medal – first place	2011 Germany
Silver medal – second place	2015 Canada
AFC Women's Asian Cup
Gold medal – first place	2014 Vietnam
Gold medal – first place	2018 Jordan
Bronze medal – third place	2008 Vietnam
Bronze medal – third place	2010 China
AFC U-19 Women's Championship
Silver medal – second place	2007 China
AFC U-16 Women's Championship
Gold medal – first place	2005 South Korea
- * Club domestic league appearances and goals as of 20 November 2022 ‡ National team caps and goals as of 2 June 2019 (UTC)

Rumi Utsugi (宇津木 瑠美, Utsugi Rumi; born 5 December 1988) is a Japanese professional footballer who plays as a midfielder for Tokyo Verdy Beleza of the WE League. She has previously played for Reign FC and Montpellier.

A former Japanese international, Utsugi helped the national team win the 2011 FIFA Women's World Cup.

== Club career ==
Utsugi was born in Kawasaki on 5 December 1988. She began her professional career at Nippon TV Beleza in 2004. During her time at the club, she won four L.League titles and five Empress's Cups. In August 2010, after six years at Beleza, Utsugi departed her home country to sign for French club Montpellier of the Division 1 Féminine. After joining the club, she became the first Japanese player to play in the league.

== International career ==
A left-footed defensive midfielder, Utsugi has represented Japan at the 2007, 2011, and 2015 editions of the World Cup, as well as two Asian Cup competitions. Japan won the 2011 World Cup. She was named in the World Cup 2015 All-Star squad.

== Career statistics ==
=== Club ===
Appearances and goals by club, season and competition
Club	Season	League		Cup		League Cup		Total	
Club	Season	Apps	Goals	Apps	Goals	Apps	Goals	Apps	Goals
Nippon TV Beleza	2004	9	0	0	0	–		9	0
Nippon TV Beleza	2005	14	1	2	0	–		16	1
Nippon TV Beleza	2006	7	0	3	1	–		10	1
Nippon TV Beleza	2007	9	0	2	0	2	0	13	0
Nippon TV Beleza	2008	9	1	1	0	–		10	1
Nippon TV Beleza	2009	20	3	3	0	–		23	3
Nippon TV Beleza	2010	8	2	–		1	0	9	2
Nippon TV Beleza	Total	76	7	11	1	3	0	90	8
Montpellier	2010–11	19	3	5	1	–		24	4
Montpellier	2011–12	16	2	5	1	–		21	3
Montpellier	2012–13	17	0	5	0	–		22	0
Montpellier	2013–14	18	10	1	0	–		19	10
Montpellier	2014–15	19	3	6	0	–		25	3
Montpellier	2015–16	12	1	2	0	–		14	1
Montpellier	Total	101	19	24	2	–		125	21
Reign FC	2016	7	1	–		–		7	1
Reign FC	2017	20	1	–		–		20	1
Reign FC	2018	16	1	–		–		16	1
Reign FC	Total	43	3	–		–		43	3
Career total		220	29	35	3	3	0	258	32

=== International ===
Appearances and goals by national team and year
National team	Year	Apps	Goals
Japan	2005	5	0
Japan	2006	2	0
Japan	2007	9	0
Japan	2008	10	4
Japan	2009	3	0
Japan	2010	9	1
Japan	2011	9	0
Japan	2012	7	0
Japan	2013	8	0
Japan	2014	12	0
Japan	2015	13	0
Japan	2016	3	0
Japan	2017	13	0
Japan	2018	8	1
Japan	2019	2	0
Total		113	6

Scores and results list Japan's goal tally first, score column indicates score after each Utsugi goal.

List of international goals scored by Rumi Utsugi
No.	Date	Venue	Opponent	Score	Result	Competition
1	10 March 2008	Dasaki Stadium, Achna, Cyprus	Russia	3–1	3–1	2008 Cyprus Cup
2	12 March 2008	GSZ Stadium, Larnaca, Cyprus	Netherlands	2–1	2–1	2008 Cyprus Cup
3	31 May 2008	Thong Nhat Stadium, Ho Chi Minh City, Vietnam	Chinese Taipei	2–0	11–0	2008 AFC Women's Asian Cup
4	31 May 2008	Thong Nhat Stadium, Ho Chi Minh City, Vietnam	Chinese Taipei	5–0	11–0	2008 AFC Women's Asian Cup
5	22 May 2010	Chengdu Sports Center, Chengdu, China	Thailand	3–0	4–0	2010 AFC Women's Asian Cup
6	2 March 2018	Bela Vista Municipal Stadium, Parchal, Portugal	Iceland	2–1	2–1	2018 Algarve Cup

== Honours ==
Nippon TV Beleza

- L.League: 2005, 2006, 2007, 2008, 2010
- Empress's Cup: 2005, 2006, 2008, 2009
- Nadeshiko League Cup: 2007, 2010

Japan

- FIFA Women's World Cup: 2011; runners-up 2015
- AFC U-16 Women's Championship: 2005

== See also ==
- List of FIFA Women's World Cup winning players
- List of women's footballers with 100 or more caps
- List of players who have appeared in multiple FIFA Women's World Cups
- List of Japan women's international footballers
- List of OL Reign players
