= Yuki Tsuchihashi =

Japanese footballer

Yuki Tsuchihashi 土橋 優貴
Personal information
- Full name: Yuki Tsuchihashi
- Date of birth: January 16, 1980 (age 46)
- Place of birth: Anan, Tokushima, Japan
- Height: 1.63 m (5 ft 4 in)
- Position: Defender

Youth career
- 1998–2001: Osaka University of Health and Sport Sciences

Senior career*
Years	Team	Apps	(Gls)
2002–2005	Tasaki Perule FC	61	(9)
2006	Ohara Gakuen JaSRA	21	(6)
2007–2012	Urawa Reds	113	(5)
Total		195	(20)

International career
2001	Japan	4	(0)
Medal record
Tasaki Perule FC
Winner	Nadeshiko League	2003
Runner-up	Nadeshiko League	2002
Runner-up	Nadeshiko League	2005
Winner	Empress's Cup	2002
Winner	Empress's Cup	2003
Runner-up	Empress's Cup	2005
Urawa Reds
Winner	Nadeshiko League	2009
Runner-up	Nadeshiko League	2010
Runner-up	Nadeshiko League Cup	2007
Runner-up	Nadeshiko League Cup	2010
Runner-up	Empress's Cup	2009
Runner-up	Empress's Cup	2010
Representing Japan
AFC Women's Asian Cup
Silver medal – second place	2001 Chinese Taipei
- * Club domestic league appearances and goals

Yuki Tsuchihashi (土橋 優貴, Tsuchihashi Yuki; born January 16, 1980) is a former Japanese football player. She played for Japan national team.

== Club career ==
Tsuchihashi was born in Anan on January 16, 1980. After graduating from Osaka University of Health and Sport Sciences, she joined Tasaki Perule FC in 2002. In 2006, she moved to Ohara Gakuen JaSRA. In 2007, she moved to Urawa Reds. She was selected Best Eleven in 2009. She retired end of 2012 season.

== National team career ==
On August 5, 2001, when Tsuchihashi was an Osaka University of Health and Sport Sciences student, she debuted for Japan national team against China. She played at 2001 AFC Championship. She played 4 games for Japan in 2001.

== National team statistics ==
Japan national team
Year	Apps	Goals
2001	4	0
Total	4	0
