= 2007 Nadeshiko League Cup final =

| Nippon TV Beleza | Urawa Reds Ladies |
| 2 | 1 |
- Date: September 24, 2007
- Venue: Saitama Stadium 2002, Saitama

2007 Nadeshiko League Cup final was the 5th final of the Nadeshiko League Cup competition. The final was played at Saitama Stadium 2002 in Saitama on September 24, 2007. Nippon TV Beleza won the championship.

== Overview ==
Nippon TV Beleza won their 1st title, by defeating Urawa Reds Ladies 2–1 with Yuki Nagasato and Yukari Kinga goal.

== Match details ==
September 24, 2007

| Nippon TV Beleza | 2-1 | Urawa Reds Ladies |
|---|---|---|
| Yuki Nagasato 38'; Yukari Kinga 81' | | Kozue Ando 65' |

Saitama Stadium 2002

== See also ==
- 2007 Nadeshiko League Cup
