= Saiko Takahashi =

Japanese footballer

Saiko Takahashi 高橋 彩子
Personal information
- Full name: Saiko Takahashi
- Date of birth: April 11, 1976 (age 50)
- Place of birth: Osaka, Japan
- Height: 1.55 m (5 ft 1 in)
- Position: Midfielder

Senior career*
Years	Team	Apps	(Gls)
1995–1998	Nikko Securities Dream Ladies	29	(5)
1999	OKI FC Winds	14	(2)
2000–2009	Urawa Reds	167	(32)
Total		210	(39)

International career
2005	Japan	2	(0)
Medal record
Nikko Securities Dream Ladies
Winner	Nadeshiko League	1996
Winner	Nadeshiko League	1997
Winner	Nadeshiko League	1998
Runner-up	Nadeshiko League	1995
Winner	Empress's Cup	1996
Runner-up	Empress's Cup	1998
Urawa Reds
Winner	Nadeshiko League	2004
Winner	Nadeshiko League	2009
Runner-up	Nadeshiko League	2006
Runner-up	Nadeshiko League Cup	2007
Runner-up	Empress's Cup	2004
Runner-up	Empress's Cup	2009
- * Club domestic league appearances and goals

Saiko Takahashi (高橋 彩子, Takahashi Saiko; born April 11, 1976) is a former Japanese football player. She played for Japan national team.

== Club career ==
Takahashi was born in Osaka Prefecture on April 11, 1976. After graduating from high school, she joined Nikko Securities Dream Ladies in 1995. The club won L.League championship for 3 years in a row (1996-1998). However, the club was disbanded in 1998 due to financial strain. She moved to OKI FC Winds in 1999. The club was disbanded, so she moved to Urawa Reinas FC (later Urawa Reds) in 2000. She was selected Best Eleven in 2004. She retired end of 2009 season.

== National team career ==
On March 29, 2005, when Takahashi was 28 years old, she debuted for Japan national team against Australia. She played 2 games for Japan in 2005.

== National team statistics ==
Japan national team
Year	Apps	Goals
2005	2	0
Total	2	0
