= Aya Sameshima =

Japanese footballer (born 1987)

Aya Sameshima 鮫島 彩
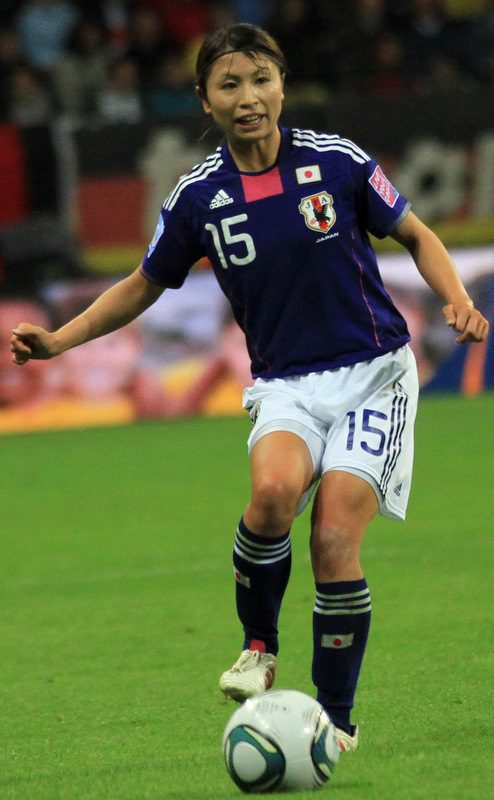
- Sameshima playing for Japan against Sweden in the 2011 World Cup semi finals

Personal information
- Full name: Aya Sameshima
- Date of birth: 16 June 1987 (age 39)
- Place of birth: Utsunomiya, Tochigi, Japan
- Height: 1.63 m (5 ft 4 in)
- Position: Left back

Youth career
- 2003–2005: Tokiwagi Gakuen High School

Senior career*
Years	Team	Apps	(Gls)
2006–2011	TEPCO Mareeze	98	(18)
2011	Boston Breakers	5	(0)
2011–2012	Montpellier	18	(0)
2012–2014	Vegalta Sendai	21	(3)
2015–2020	INAC Kobe Leonessa	73	(2)
2021–2024	Omiya Ardija Ventus	40	(0)
Total		215	(23)

International career^{‡}
2008–2021	Japan	114	(5)
Medal record
Representing Japan
Olympic Games
Silver medal – second place	2012 London	Team
FIFA Women's World Cup
Gold medal – first place	2011 Germany
Silver medal – second place	2015 Canada
AFC Women's Asian Cup
Gold medal – first place	2018 Jordan
Bronze medal – third place	2008 Vietnam
Bronze medal – third place	2010 China
Asian Games
Gold medal – first place	2010 Guangzhou	Team
Gold medal – first place	2018 Jakarta-Palembang	Team
- * Club domestic league appearances and goals as of 31 December 2018 ‡ National team caps and goals as of 8 April 2021

Aya Sameshima (鮫島 彩, Sameshima Aya; born 16 June 1987) is a Japanese former footballer. Primarily a left back, she has over 100 caps for the Japan national team.

== Club career ==
Sameshima was born in Utsunomiya on 16 June 1987. She played youth football for Kawachi SC Juvenile between 1995 and 2002 and Tokiwagi Gakuen High School LSC from 2003 until 2005. In 2006, she joined TEPCO Mareeze, the club owned by the Tokyo Electric Power Company. During her time at Mareeze she lived in the J-Village Sports complex in Hirono near Fukushima, and like other players, she worked at the TEPCO-run Fukushima Daiichi Nuclear Power Plant to earn a living whilst playing for the club.

Following the 2011 Tōhoku earthquake and tsunami and subsequent nuclear disaster, during which the team were in a training camp in the south of the country, the club pulled out of the L.League for the remainder of the season. Sameshima then began training with the Boston Breakers in March 2011, before signing for the club permanently, the first former Mareeze player to sign for another club. She made her debut for the Breakers against Sky Blue on 12 June as a second-half substitute for Alex Scott, becoming the first Japanese international to play for the club.

On 19 September 2011, Sameshima joined French club Montpellier, joining compatriot Rumi Utsugi at the club. She returned to Japan to play for Vegalta Sendai in 2012, before joining Houston Dash in January 2014. However, due to injuries she failed to contract, and rejoined Vegalta Sendai in July 2014. She subsequently signed for INAC Kobe Leonessa for the 2015 season.

== National team career ==
After playing for the Japanese team at the AFC U-19 Championship in 2006, Sameshima made her full international debut on 10 March 2008, against Russia, and played in the 2008 Asian Cup that year, scoring the first goal in an 11–0 win over Chinese Taipei. In 2010, she played in the 2010 Asian Games, winning a gold medal as Japan won the tournament. In 2011, she was part of the Japan squad for the 2011 World Cup, playing in every match for the World Cup Champion Japanese team. She was part of the Japanese team that won the silver medal at the 2012 Summer Olympics. She also played in the 2015 World Cup where Japan were the runners-up. In 2018, she played at 2018 Asian Cup, helping Japan win the championship. She played 103 games and scored 5 goals for Japan.

== Club statistics ==
Club	Season	League		Cup		League Cup		Total	
Club	Season	Apps	Goals	Apps	Goals	Apps	Goals	Apps	Goals
TEPCO Mareeze	2006	17	1	2	0	-		19	1
TEPCO Mareeze	2007	21	8	3	0	4	3	28	11
TEPCO Mareeze	2008	21	5	3	0	-		24	5
TEPCO Mareeze	2009	21	1	3	1	-		24	2
TEPCO Mareeze	2010	18	3	2	0	5	3	25	6
TEPCO Mareeze	Total	98	18	13	1	9	6	120	25
Boston Breakers	2011	5	0	-		-		5	0
Montpellier	2011–12	18	0	5	0	-		23	0
Vegalta Sendai	2012	6	3	2	1	-		8	4
Vegalta Sendai	2013	9	0	0	0	2	2	11	2
Vegalta Sendai	2014	6	0	-		3	1	9	1
Vegalta Sendai	Total	21	3	2	1	5	3	28	7
INAC Kobe Leonessa	2015								
Career total		142	21	20	2	14	9	176	32

== National team statistics ==
Japan national team
Year	Apps	Goals
2008	2	1
2009	3	0
2010	15	1
2011	18	0
2012	14	0
2013	3	0
2014	2	1
2015	12	1
2016	3	0
2017	13	0
2018	18	1
2019	10	0
2020	0	0
2021	1	0
Total	114	5

=== National team goals ===
#	Date	Venue	Opponent	Score	Result	Competition
1	31 May 2008	Ho Chi Minh City, Vietnam	Chinese Taipei	0–1	0–11	2008 AFC Women's Asian Cup
2	20 May 2010	Chengdu, China	Myanmar	4–0	8–0	2010 AFC Women's Asian Cup
3	28 October 2014	BC Place, Vancouver	Canada	2–3	2–3	Friendly
4	12 June 2015	BC Place, Vancouver	Cameroon	1–0	2–1	2015 FIFA Women's World Cup
5	1 April 2018	Isahaya, Japan	Ghana	7–1	7–1	Friendly

== Honors ==
- FIFA Women's World Cup
  - Winner, 2011
- Football at the Asian Games
  - Gold Medal, 2010
- East Asian Football Championship
  - Winner, 2010

== See also ==
- List of women's footballers with 100 or more caps
