= 2010 Nadeshiko League =

Nadeshiko.League
- Season: 2010
- Champions: NTV Beleza; 12th L. League title
- Top goalscorer: Shinobu Ohno (13 goals)

Statistics of Nadeshiko League in the 2010 season. NTV Beleza won the championship.

As of 2010, by the reformation announced in November 2009, Division 1 and Division 2 was renamed as Nadeshiko League and Challenge League respectively. Also, the number of participating teams became 10 teams for Nadeshiko League from 8, and 12 teams for Challenge League, from 8, dividing into 2 sections of 6 teams.

== Nadeshiko League (Division 1) ==
=== Result ===
Pos	Team	Pld	W	D	L	GF	GA	GD	Pts	Qualification
1	NTV Beleza	18	16	1	1	48	14	+34	49	Champions
2	Urawa Red Diamonds Ladies	18	14	1	3	45	11	+34	43	
3	TEPCO Mareeze	18	11	1	6	35	20	+15	34	
4	INAC Kobe Leonessa	18	11	1	6	32	22	+10	34	
5	Okayama Yunogo Belle	18	9	2	7	32	30	+2	29	
6	Albirex Niigata Ladies	18	9	1	8	36	24	+12	28	
7	JEF United Ichihara Chiba Ladies	18	8	1	9	30	36	−6	25	
8	Fukuoka J. Anclas	18	2	2	14	15	41	−26	8	
9	AS Elfen Sayama F.C.	18	2	1	15	9	56	−47	7	
10	Iga F.C. Kunoichi	18	1	3	14	10	39	−29	6	Division 1 promotion/relegation Series

=== League awards ===
==== Best player ====
Player	Club
(Japan) Shinobu Ohno	NTV Beleza

==== Top scorers ====
Rank	Scorer	Club	Goals
1	(Japan) Shinobu Ohno	NTV Beleza	13
2	(Japan) Yuki Yasuda	JEF United Chiba Ladies	11
3	(Japan) Eriko Arakawa	Urawa Reds Ladies	10
3	(Japan) Yuika Sugasawa	Albirex Niigata Ladies	10
5	(Japan) Risa Fukasawa	JEF United Chiba Ladies	9

==== Best eleven ====
Pos	Player	Club
GK	(Japan) Nozomi Yamago	Urawa Reds Ladies
DF	(Japan) Yukari Kinga	NTV Beleza
DF	(Japan) Kyoko Yano	Urawa Reds Ladies
DF	(Japan) Azusa Iwashimizu	NTV Beleza
DF	(Japan) Aya Samejima	TEPCO Mareeze
MF	(Japan) Megumi Kamionobe	Albirex Niigata Ladies
MF	(Japan) Miyuki Yanagita	Urawa Reds Ladies
MF	(Japan) Akiko Niwata	Urawa Reds Ladies
FW	(Japan) Shinobu Ohno	NTV Beleza
FW	(Japan) Nahomi Kawasumi	INAC Kobe Leonessa
FW	(Japan) Eriko Arakawa	Urawa Reds Ladies

==== Best young player ====
Player	Club
(Japan) Nozomi Fujita	Urawa Reds Ladies

== Challenge League (Division 2) ==
=== Result ===
==== East ====
Pos	Team	Pld	W	D	L	GF	GA	GD	Pts	Qualification
1	Tokiwagi Gakuen High School LSC	15	12	2	1	63	18	+45	38	
2	JFA Academy Fukushima	15	11	1	3	46	26	+20	34	
3	Nippon Sport Science University	15	8	2	5	29	19	+10	26	
4	AC Nagano Parceiro Ladies	15	4	3	8	23	38	−15	15	Division 1 promotion/relegation Series
5	Norddea Hokkaido	15	2	2	11	10	36	−26	8	
6	Shimizudaihachi Pleiades	15	2	2	11	14	48	−34	8	Division 2 promotion/relegation Series

==== West ====
Pos	Team	Pld	W	D	L	GF	GA	GD	Pts	Qualification
1	Speranza F.C. Takatsuki	15	14	0	1	63	14	+49	42	Division 1 promotion/relegation Series
2	Bunnys Kyoto S.C.	15	8	2	5	32	23	+9	26	Division 1 promotion/relegation Series
3	Shizuoka Sangyo University Iwata Bonita	15	7	3	5	29	24	+5	24	
4	Aguilas Kobe	15	5	5	5	21	24	−3	20	
5	Je Vrille Kagoshima	15	5	1	9	18	33	−15	16	
6	Renaissance Kumamoto F.C.	15	0	1	14	10	55	−45	1	Division 2 promotion/relegation Series

== Promotion/relegation series ==
=== Division 1 promotion/relegation series ===
==== Qualifiers ====
2010-10-11
13:00

Bunnys Kyoto S.C.	2 - 0	AC Nagano Parceiro Ladies

Nantan, Kyoto

2010-10-17
13:00

Speranza F.C. Takatsuki	7 - 0	Bunnys Kyoto S.C.

Takatsuki Hagitani Soccer Stadium

2010-10-23
14:00

AC Nagano Parceiro Ladies	1 - 5	Speranza F.C. Takatsuki

Minaminagano, Nagano
- Speranza F.C. Takatsuki play to Division 1 promotion/relegation Series Final.

==== Final ====
2010-11-03
13:00

Speranza F.C. Takatsuki	1 - 2	Iga F.C. Kunoichi

Susono, Shizuoka

2010-11-07
13:00

Iga F.C. Kunoichi	1 - 0	Speranza F.C. Takatsuki

Susono, Shizuoka
- Iga F.C. Kunoichi Stay Division 1 in 2011 Season.
- Speranza F.C. Takatsuki Stay Division 2 in 2011 Season.

=== Division 2 promotion/relegation series ===
==== Qualifiers ====
2010-11-05
11:00

Sfida Setagaya F.C.	1 - 2	F.C. Takahashi Charme

Suzuka Sports Garden

2010-11-05
14:00

Hoyo Sukarabu F.C.	0 - 0	Toyota Ladies F.C.

Suzuka Sports Garden

2010-11-06
11:00

Hoyo Sukarabu F.C.	1 - 2	Sfida Setagaya F.C.

Suzuka Sports Garden

2010-11-06
14:00

Toyota Ladies F.C.	0 - 5	F.C. Takahashi Charme

Suzuka Sports Garden

2010-11-07
11:00

Sfida Setagaya F.C.	3 - 0	Toyota Ladies F.C.

Suzuka Sports Garden

2010-11-07
14:00

F.C. Takahashi Charme	7 - 1	Hoyo Sukarabu F.C.

Suzuka Sports Garden
- F.C. Takahashi Charme, Sfida Setagaya F.C. play to Division 2 promotion/relegation Series Final.

==== Final ====
2010-11-14
11:00

F.C. Takahashi Charme	3 - 0	Shimizudaihachi Pleiades

Takahashi, Okayama

2010-11-14
11:00

Sfida Setagaya F.C.	3 - 3	Renaissance Kumamoto F.C.

Kawasaki, Kanagawa

2010-11-21
11:00

Shimizudaihachi Pleiades	1 - 0	F.C. Takahashi Charme

Shizuoka

2010-11-21
13:00

Renaissance Kumamoto F.C.	2 - 3	Sfida Setagaya F.C.

Uki, Kumamoto
- F.C. Takahashi Charme, Sfida Setagaya F.C. Promoted for Division 2 in 2011 Season.
- Shimizudaihachi Pleiades Relegated to Regional League (Tokai League) in 2011 Season.
- Renaissance Kumamoto F.C. Relegated to Regional League (Kyushu, Q League) in 2011 Season.

== See also ==
- Empress's Cup
