= Yukari Kinga =

Japanese footballer (born 1984)

Yukari Kinga 近賀 ゆかり
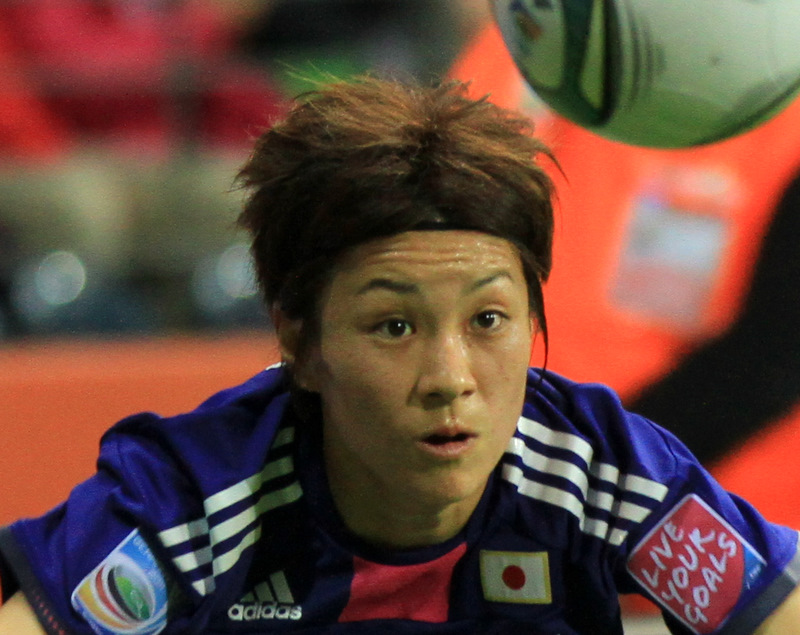
- Kinga playing for Japan in 2011

Personal information
- Full name: Yukari Kinga
- Date of birth: 2 May 1984 (age 42)
- Place of birth: Yokohama, Kanagawa, Japan
- Height: 1.61 m (5 ft 3 1/2 in)
- Position: Defender

Youth career
- 2000–2002: Shonan Gakuin High School

Senior career*
Years	Team	Apps	(Gls)
2003–2010	Nippon TV Beleza	146	(30)
2011–2013	INAC Kobe Leonessa	42	(3)
2014	Arsenal	12	(0)
2015–2016	INAC Kobe Leonessa	36	(3)
2016–2017	Canberra United	13	(3)
2017–2019	Melbourne City	31	(6)
2019	Orca Kamogawa	18	(2)
2019–2020	Melbourne City	9	(1)
2020	Orca Kamogawa	0	(0)
2021–2025	Sanfrecce Hiroshima Regina	39	(2)
Total		274	(44)

International career
2002	Japan U-20	4	(0)
2005–2016	Japan	100	(5)
Medal record
Nippon TV Beleza
Winner	Nadeshiko League	2005
Winner	Nadeshiko League	2006
Winner	Nadeshiko League	2007
Winner	Nadeshiko League	2008
Winner	Nadeshiko League	2010
Runner-up	Nadeshiko League	2003
Runner-up	Nadeshiko League	2004
Runner-up	Nadeshiko League	2009
Winner	Nadeshiko League Cup	2007
Winner	Nadeshiko League Cup	2010
Winner	Empress's Cup	2004
Winner	Empress's Cup	2005
Winner	Empress's Cup	2007
Winner	Empress's Cup	2008
Winner	Empress's Cup	2009
Runner-up	Empress's Cup	2003
INAC Kobe Leonessa
Winner	Nadeshiko League	2011
Winner	Nadeshiko League	2012
Winner	Nadeshiko League	2013
Runner-up	Nadeshiko League	2016
Winner	Nadeshiko League Cup	2013
Runner-up	Nadeshiko League Cup	2012
Winner	Empress's Cup	2011
Winner	Empress's Cup	2012
Winner	Empress's Cup	2013
Winner	Empress's Cup	2015
Winner	Empress's Cup	2016
Representing Japan
Olympic Games
Silver medal – second place	2012 London	Team
FIFA Women's World Cup
Gold medal – first place	2011 Germany
Silver medal – second place	2015 Canada
AFC Women's Asian Cup
Bronze medal – third place	2008 Vietnam
Bronze medal – third place	2010 China
Asian Games
Gold medal – first place	2010 Guangzhou	Team
AFC U-19 Women's Championship
Gold medal – first place	2002 India
- * Club domestic league appearances and goals as of 24 December 2019

Yukari Kinga (近賀 ゆかり, Kinga Yukari; born 2 May 1984) is a Japanese former football player who played as a defender. She previously played for the Japan women's national football team, winning the 2011 Fifa World Cup and an Olympic silver medal before her international retirement in 2016.

== Club career ==
=== In Japan until 2013 ===
Kinga was born in Yokohama on 2 May 1984. After graduating from high school, she joined Nippon TV Beleza in 2003 where she played as attacking midfielder and right-winger. In the 2003 season, she was given the Nadeshiko League's Best Young Player award. During her time at Nippon TV Beleza, the club won the Nadeshiko League championship 5 times. In 2011, she moved to INAC Kobe Leonessa with international players Homare Sawa, Shinobu Ohno and Chiaki Minamiyama due to financial strain at the club. At INAC Kobe Leonessa, the club won the Nadeshiko League championship for 3 years in a row (2011–2013). She was selected to the league's Best XI for 6 years in a row (2007–2012).

In January 2014, INAC's general manager revealed that Kinga had agreed to join English FA WSL club Arsenal Ladies and in February she officially signed the contract. At Arsenal, Kinga helped propel the club to reach the final of the 2014 FA Women's Cup which they won in a 2–0 margin over Everton.

She re-signed with INAC Kobe in early 2015. In 2016, she began playing in the Australian W-League for Canberra United. In October 2017, Kinga joined defending W-League champions Melbourne City. In February 2019, she returned to Japan and joined Orca Kamogawa FC. In October 2019, Kinga re-signed with Melbourne City. In February 2020, it was announced that Kinga would re-sign with Orca Kamogawa at the end of the 2019–20 W-League season.

== National team career ==
In August 2002, Kinga was selected by the Japan U-20 women's national team for the 2002 FIFA U-19 Women's World Championship. On 29 March 2005, she debuted for the Japan women's national team against Australia. She was playing as an attacking midfielder and right-winger until 2007, when she was converted to rightback by manager Hiroshi Ohashi. After she converted her position, she became a regular player in the Japan national team. Japan won the 2011 World Cup in which Kinga played in the final, came second in the 2015 World Cup and earned a silver medal in the 2012 Summer Olympics. She played 100 games and scored 5 goals for Japan until her retirement in 2016.

== Club statistics ==
Club	Season	League		National Cup		League Cup		Total	
Club	Season	Apps	Goals	Apps	Goals	Apps	Goals	Apps	Goals
Nippon TV Beleza	2003	20	6	4	4	-		24	10
Nippon TV Beleza	2004	14	7	4	1	-		18	8
Nippon TV Beleza	2005	18	6	5	2	-		23	8
Nippon TV Beleza	2006	14	2	3	3	-		17	5
Nippon TV Beleza	2007	21	3	4	0	2	1	27	4
Nippon TV Beleza	2008	20	0	4	1	-		24	1
Nippon TV Beleza	2009	21	3	4	0	-		25	3
Nippon TV Beleza	2010	18	3	1	0	6	1	25	4
Nippon TV Beleza	Total	146	30	29	11	8	2	183	43
INAC Kobe Leonessa	2011	16	1	4	0	-		20	1
INAC Kobe Leonessa	2012	18	2	3	0	5	0	24	2
INAC Kobe Leonessa	2013	8	0	4	2	5	0	17	2
INAC Kobe Leonessa	Total	42	3	11	2	10	0	61	5
Career total		188	33	40	13	18	2	244	48

== National team statistics ==
Japan national team
Year	Apps	Goals
2005	1	0
2006	2	0
2007	16	0
2008	18	1
2009	3	1
2010	15	2
2011	17	0
2012	15	1
2013	1	0
2014	4	0
2015	5	0
2016	3	0
Total	100	5

International goals
#	Date	Venue	Opponent	Score	Result	Competition
1.	12 August 2008	Shanghai, China	Norway	1–1	1–5	Football at the 2008 Summer Olympics
2.	1 August 2009	Montargis, France	France	0–3	0–4	Friendly Match
3.	6 February 2010	Chōfu, Japan	China	2–0	2–0	2010 EAFF Women's Football Championship
4.	8 May 2010	Matsumoto, Japan	Mexico	1–0	4–0	Friendly Match
5.	1 April 2012	Sendai, Japan	United States	1–0	1–1	Kirin Challenge Cup

== Honors ==
=== International career ===
Japan

- Summer Olympics: Silver Medal: 2012
- FIFA Women's World Cup: Champion: 2011
- Asian Games: Gold Medal: 2010
- East Asian Football Championship: Champions: 2008, 2010

=== Club ===
Nippon TV Beleza

- L.League:Champion (5): 2005, 2006, 2007, 2008, 2010
- Nadeshiko League Cup: Champion (2): 2007, 2010
- Empress's Cup: Champion (5): 2004, 2005, 2007, 2008, 2009

INAC Kobe

- L.League:Champion (3): 2011, 2012, 2013
- Empress's Cup: Champion (3): 2011, 2012, 2013
- Nadeshiko League Cup: Champion (1): 2012

Arsenal

- FA Women's Cup: Champion (1): 2014

Sanfrecce Hiroshima Regina

- WE League Cup: Champion (2): 2023–24, 2024–25

=== Individual ===
- L.League: Best 11 (6): 2007, 2008, 2009, 2010, 2011, 2012
- L.League: Best Young Player: 2003
- Nadeshiko League Cup: MVP: 2007
