= 2009 Nadeshiko League =

Nadeshiko.League
- Season: 2009
- Champions: Urawa Red Diamonds Ladies; 2nd L. League title
- Relegated: Speranza F.C. Takatsuki
- Top goalscorer: Kozue Ando (18 goals)

Statistics of Nadeshiko League in the 2009 season. Urawa Reds Ladies won the championship.

== Division 1 ==
=== Result ===
Pos	Team	Pld	W	D	L	GF	GA	GD	Pts	Qualification
1	Urawa Red Diamonds Ladies	21	17	3	1	55	13	+42	54	Champions
2	NTV Beleza	21	13	4	4	46	18	+28	43	
3	TEPCO Mareeze	21	12	2	7	37	28	+9	38	
4	INAC Kobe Leonessa	21	11	4	6	49	25	+24	37	
5	JEF United Ichihara Chiba Ladies	21	7	1	13	22	50	−28	22	
6	Okayama Yunogo Belle	21	5	6	10	28	33	−5	21	
7	Albirex Niigata Ladies	21	5	5	11	20	33	−13	20	
8	Speranza F.C. Takatsuki	21	0	3	18	8	65	−57	3	Division 1 promotion/relegation Series

Source: RSSSF

=== League awards ===
==== Best player ====
Player	Club
(Japan) Kozue Ando	Urawa Reds Ladies

==== Top scorers ====
Rank	Scorer	Club	Goals
1	(Japan) Kozue Ando	Urawa Reds Ladies	18

==== Best eleven ====
Pos	Player	Club
GK	(Japan) Nozomi Yamago	Urawa Reds Ladies
DF	(Japan) Yukari Kinga	NTV Beleza
DF	(Japan) Kyoko Yano	Urawa Reds Ladies
DF	(Japan) Azusa Iwashimizu	NTV Beleza
DF	(Japan) Yuki Tsuchihashi	Urawa Reds Ladies
MF	(Japan) Megumi Kamionobe	Albirex Niigata Ladies
MF	(Japan) Miyuki Yanagita	Urawa Reds Ladies
MF	(Japan) Akiko Niwata	Urawa Reds Ladies
FW	(Japan) Shinobu Ohno	NTV Beleza
FW	(Japan) Kozue Ando	Urawa Reds Ladies
FW	(Japan) Ayako Kitamoto	Urawa Reds Ladies

==== Best young player ====
Player	Club
(Japan) Megumi Takase	INAC Kobe Leonessa

== Division 2 ==
=== Result ===
Pos	Team	Pld	W	D	L	GF	GA	GD	Pts	Promotion or qualification
1	AS Elfen Sayama F.C.	21	17	1	3	92	23	+69	52	Promoted for Division 1
2	Iga F.C. Kunoichi	21	17	0	4	84	17	+67	51	Promoted for Division 1
3	Fukuoka J. Anclas	21	16	1	4	88	18	+70	49	Division 1 promotion/relegation Series
4	Shimizudaihachi Pleiades	21	6	7	8	29	22	+7	25	
5	Ohara JaSRA L.S.C.	21	7	4	10	26	39	−13	25	
6	Bunnys Kyoto S.C.	21	4	5	12	16	46	−30	17	
7	Je Vrille Kagoshima	21	5	2	14	22	58	−36	17	
8	Renaissance Kumamoto F.C.	21	1	2	18	12	150	−138	5	

- Best Player: Yoshie Kasazaki, AS Elfen Sayama F.C.

== Promotion/relegation series ==
=== Division 1 promotion/relegation series ===
2009-11-08
13:00

Speranza F.C. Takatsuki	0 - 3	Fukuoka J. Anclas

Takatsuki Hagitani Soccer Stadium

2009-11-15
14:00

Fukuoka J. Anclas	0 - 1	Speranza F.C. Takatsuki

Ogoori, Fukuoka
- Fukuoka J. Anclas Promoted for Division 1 in 2010 Season.
- Speranza F.C. Takatsuki Relegated to Division 2 in 2010 Season.

=== Division 2 Promotion series ===
==== Block A ====
2009-11-21
11:00

Shizuoka Sangyo University Iwata Ladies	0 - 3	Nippon Sport Science University L.S.C.

Susono, Shizuoka

2009-11-21
11:00

Hoyo Sukarabu F.C.	0 - 7	JFA Academy Fukushima L.F.C.

Susono, Shizuoka

2009-11-22
11:00

JFA Academy Fukushima L.F.C.	5 - 1	Shizuoka Sangyo University Iwata Ladies

Susono, Shizuoka

2009-11-22
11:00

Hoyo Sukarabu F.C.	0 - 3	Nippon Sport Science University L.S.C.

Susono, Shizuoka

2009-11-23
11:00

Shizuoka Sangyo University Iwata Ladies	1 - 1	Hoyo Sukarabu F.C.

Susono, Shizuoka

2009-11-23
11:00

Nippon Sport Science University L.S.C.	4 - 0	JFA Academy Fukushima L.F.C.

Susono, Shizuoka
- Nippon Sport Science University L.S.C., Shizuoka Sangyo University Iwata Ladies, JFA Academy Fukushima L.F.C. Promoted for Division 2 in 2010 Season.

==== Block B ====
2009-11-21
14:00

Tokiwagi Gakuen High School L.S.C.	3 - 1	Ikai F.C. Ladies

Susono, Shizuoka

2009-11-21
14:00

F.C. AGUILAS	1 - 0	A.S.C. Adooma

Susono, Shizuoka

2009-11-22
14:00

A.S.C. Adooma	0 - 5	Tokiwagi Gakuen High School L.S.C.

Susono, Shizuoka

2009-11-22
14:00

F.C. AGUILAS	2 - 1	Ikai F.C. Ladies

Susono, Shizuoka

2009-11-23
14:00

Tokiwagi Gakuen High School L.S.C.	3 - 1	F.C. AGUILAS

Susono, Shizuoka

2009-11-23
14:00

Ikai F.C. Ladies	1 - 4	A.S.C. Adooma

Susono, Shizuoka
- Tokiwagi Gakuen High School L.S.C., F.C. AGUILAS, A.S.C. Adooma Promoted for Division 2 in 2010 Season.

== See also ==
- Empress's Cup
