= Speranza Osaka =

Speranza Osaka スペランツァ大阪
- Full name: Speranza Osaka
- Nickname: Speranza
- Founded: 1990; 36 years ago
- Ground: Takatsuki Hagitani Soccer Stadium
- Capacity: 3,000
- Chairman: Sukesaburo Kitawaki
- Manager: Kenji Honnami
- League: Nadeshiko League Div.1
- 2024: Nadeshiko League Div.1 10th of 12
- Website: http://www.speranzafc.jp/
Home colours	Away colours

Speranza Osaka (スペランツァ大阪, Superantsu~a Ōsaka) is a women's football team which plays in Japan's Nadeshiko League Division 1. It was founded in 1990 and enter in the L.League (today Nadeshiko League) in the same year. From the 2019 season, the club has adopted the new name as "Speranza Osaka-Takatsuki".

Because it was founded by the multinational giant Panasonic, Speranza Osaka works as a kind of women's team of the J.League giants Gamba Osaka.

== Squad ==
=== Current squad ===
As of 2 May 2022. Note: Flags indicate national team as defined under FIFA eligibility rules; some limited exceptions apply. Players may hold more than one non-FIFA nationality.

No.	Pos.	Nation	Player
1	GK	JPN	Maya Ono
2	DF	JPN	Arisa Takeda
3	DF	JPN	Ayako Tsuboi
4	DF	JPN	Yumeko Akiba
5	MF	JPN	Midori Yoshimura
6	DF	JPN	Satoko Hirano
9	MF	JPN	Naomi Torao
10	MF	JPN	Toshiko Saito
11	MF	JPN	Yuki Hazuki
13	FW	JPN	Yuko Shimamura
15	FW	JPN	Mari Shiotani

No.	Pos.	Nation	Player
16	MF	JPN	Saki Takahashi
18	MF	JPN	Saki Honda
19	GK	JPN	Maho Yamamoto
20	FW	JPN	Yu Ishikawa
21	MF	JPN	Haruka Yoshioka
22	MF	JPN	Misato Takatani
23	MF	JPN	Fumika Sakumoto
24	DF	JPN	Wakana Kitagawa
25	DF	JPN	Momo Hayashi
26	MF	JPN	Mio Sakanaka
27	DF	JPN	Natsuki Ichino
28	DF	JPN	Suzuka Fujino
32	MF	JPN	Akane Shun

== Honors ==
=== Domestic competitions ===
- Nadeshiko.League Division 1
  - Champions (1) : 1994
- Nadeshiko League Cup
  - Runners-up (1) : 1998

== Results ==
Season	Domestic League				National Cup	League Cup
Season	League	Level	Place	Tms.	National Cup	League Cup
1991	JLSL	1	9th	10	2nd Stage	-
1992	JLSL	1	4th	10	Quarter-finals	-
1993	JLSL	1	9th	10	Semi-finals	-
1994	L	1	1st	10	Quarter-finals	-
1995	L	1	4th	10	Quarter-finals	-
1996	L	1	5th	10	Quarter-finals	4th
1997	L	1	6th	10	Quarter-finals	3rd
1998	L	1	5th	10	Quarter-finals	Runners-up
1999	L	1	5th	8	Semi-finals	Group Stage
2000	L	1	5th	9	Semi-finals	-
2001	L	1	7th	10	Quarter-finals	-
2002	L	1	6th	11	1st Stage	-
2003	L	1	6th	13	Quarter-finals	-
2004	L1	1	7th	8	2nd Stage	-
2005	L1	1	7th	8	Quarter-finals	-
2006	Nadeshiko Div.1	1	7th	8	3rd Stage	-
2007	Nadeshiko; Div.2	2	4th	8	Quarter-finals	Group Stage
2008	Nadeshiko; Div.2	2	2nd	9	3rd Stage	-
2009	Nadeshiko Div.1	1	8th	8	3rd Stage	-
2010	Challenge (West)	2	1st	6	2nd Stage	-
2011	Challenge (West)	2	2nd	6	2nd Stage	-
2012	Nadeshiko	1	8th	10	3rd Stage	Group Stage
2013	Nadeshiko	1	10th	10	3rd Stage	Group Stage
2014	Challenge	2	1st	16	2nd Stage	-
2015	Nadeshiko Div.1	1	9th	10	3rd Stage	-
2016	Nadeshiko Div.1	1	9th	10	2nd Stage	Group Stage
2017	Nadeshiko Div.2	2	10th	10	2nd Stage	Group Stage / Div.2
2018						
2019						
2020						
2021						
2022						
2023						

== Transition of team name ==
- Osaka-Takatsuki Ladies SC : 1990
- Matsushita Electric Ladies SC Bambina : 1991 - 1994
- Matsushita Electric Panasonic Bambina : 1995 - 1999
- Speranza FC Takatsuki : 2000 - 2011
- Speranza FC Osaka-Takatsuki : 2012 – 2015
- Konomiya Speranza Osaka-Takatsuki : 2016 – 2018
- Speranza Osaka-Takatsuki : 2019 – 2021
- Speranza Osaka : 2022 – Present
