= Hoyo Sukarabu FC =

Hoyo Sukarabu F.C. HOYOスカラブF.C.
- Full name: Hoyo Sukarabu F.C.
- Nickname(s): Sukarabu
- Founded: 2004
- Manager: Sachiko Arakawa
- League: Challenge.League Div.2
- 2012: 6th (Q.League) Div.3
Home colours	Away colours

Hoyo Sukarabu F.C. (HOYOスカラブF.C.), known until 2006 as Sukarabu Jr., is a women's football club playing in Japan's football league, Challenge League. Its hometown is the city of Oita.

== Squad ==
=== Current squad ===
As of April 6, 2013 Note: Flags indicate national team as defined under FIFA eligibility rules; some limited exceptions apply. Players may hold more than one non-FIFA nationality.

No.	Pos.	Nation	Player
1	GK	(Japan) JPN	Minami Umemura
2	DF	(Japan) JPN	Emiko Hashimoto
3	FW	(Japan) JPN	Kaho Kusuno
4	DF	(Japan) JPN	Yuna Kinoshita
5	DF	(Japan) JPN	Kanako Himeno
6	FW	(Japan) JPN	Mitsuki Sato
7	MF	(Japan) JPN	Chihiro Kiyosue
8	MF	(Japan) JPN	Misa Hide
9	MF	(Japan) JPN	Risa Kugimiya
10	FW	(Japan) JPN	Arisa Suzu

No.	Pos.	Nation	Player
11	MF	(Japan) JPN	Mari Wada
12	MF	(Japan) JPN	Mei Matsumoto
13	FW	(Japan) JPN	Emi Chiba
14	GK	(Japan) JPN	Rurika Kodama
15	DF	(Japan) JPN	Maki Nagamatsu
16	FW	(Japan) JPN	Maho Jikumaru
17	MF	(Japan) JPN	Nanami Kondo
19	GK	(Japan) JPN	Hitomi Katsuo
23	MF	(Japan) JPN	Mizuki Nakano

== Results ==
Season	Domestic League				National Cup	League Cup	League Note
Season	League	Level	Place	Tms.	National Cup	League Cup	League Note
2005	Kyushu	3	6th	8	DNQ	-	
2006	Kyushu	3	4th	8	DNQ	-	
2007	Kyushu	3	2nd	8	DNQ	-	
2008	Kyushu	3	3rd	7	DNQ	-	
2009	Kyushu	3	2nd	6	DNQ	-	
2010	Kyushu	3	3rd	6	DNQ	-	
2011	Kyushu	3	2nd	7	DNQ	-	
2012	Kyushu	3	6th	12	DNQ	-	Promoted for L.League
2013	Challenge	2	16th	16	DNQ	-	Dissolved
