= Takatsuki Hagitani Soccer Stadium =

Football stadium in Takatsuki, Osaka, Japan

Coordinates: 34°53′06″N 135°34′04″E

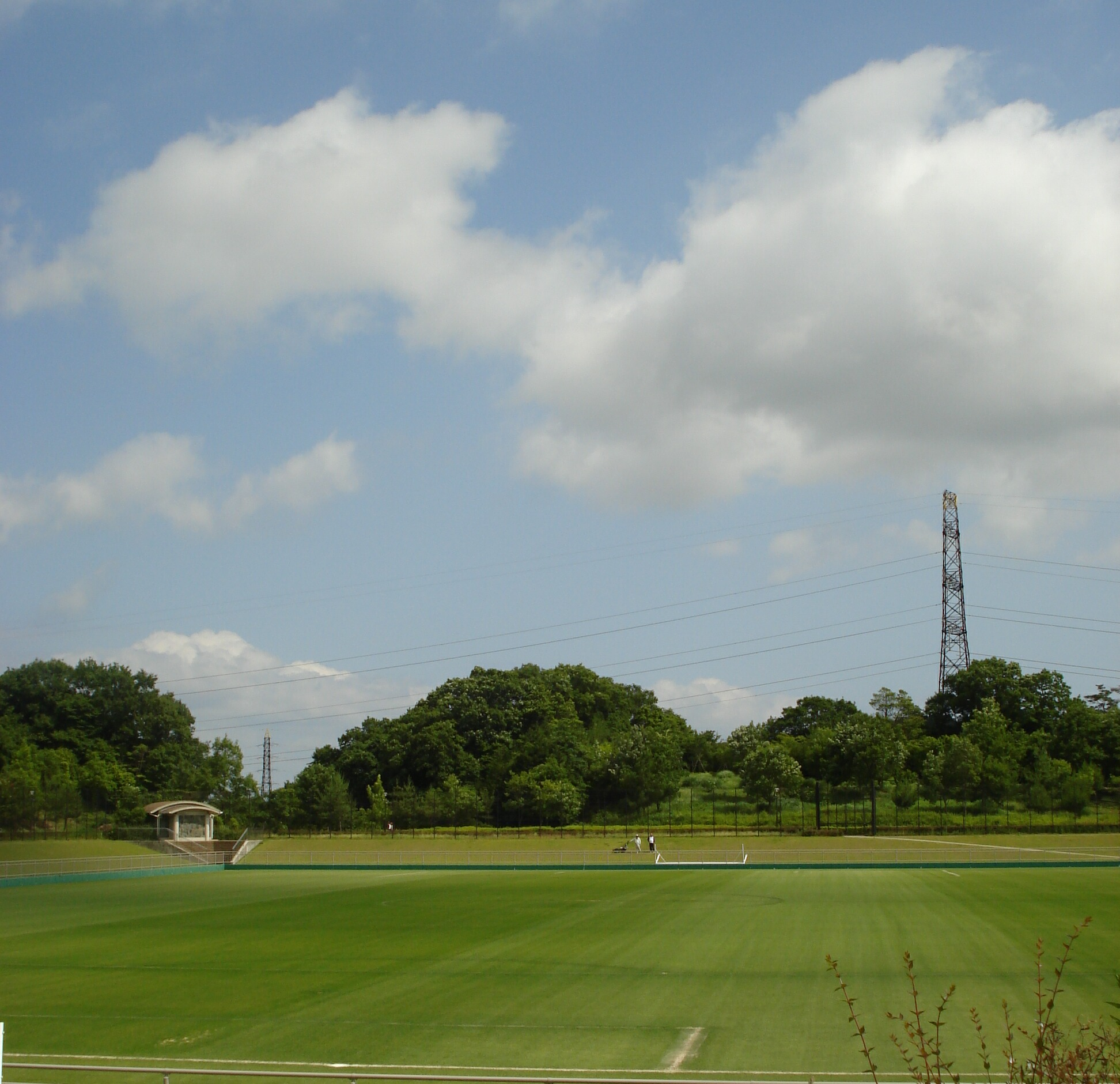
- Interactive map of Takatsuki Hagitani Soccer Stadium
- Location: Takatsuki, Osaka, Japan
- Owner: Takatsuki City
- Capacity: 3,000

Tenant
- Speranza F.C. Osaka-Takatsuki

Takatsuki Hagitani Soccer Stadium is a football stadium in Takatsuki, Osaka, Japan. It is the location in which Speranza F.C. Osaka-Takatsuki plays.
