= Rie Azami =

Japanese football player (born 1989)

Rie Azami 薊 理絵
Personal information
- Full name: Rie Azami
- Date of birth: January 11, 1989 (age 37)
- Place of birth: Higashimurayama, Tokyo, Japan
- Height: 1.61 m (5 ft 3 1/2 in)
- Position: Defender

Team information
- Current team: Chifure AS Elfen Saitama
- Number: 7

Youth career
- 2004–2006: Saitama Heisei High School

Senior career*
Years	Team	Apps	(Gls)
2007–	Chifure AS Elfen Saitama	230	(77)
Total		230	(77)

International career
2013–2015	Japan	2	(0)
- * Club domestic league appearances and goals as of December 31, 2018

Rie Azami (薊 理絵, Azami Rie; born January 11, 1989) is a Japanese footballer who plays as a defender. She plays for Chifure AS Elfen Saitama. She has also played for the Japan national team.

== Club career ==
Azami was born in Higashimurayama on January 11, 1989. After graduating from high school, she joined Chifure AS Elfen Saitama in 2007. She also plays as midfielder.

== National team career ==
On September 26, 2013, Azami debuted for Japan national team against Nigeria. She played two games for Japan until 2015.

== National team statistics ==
Japan national team
Year	Apps	Goals
2013	1	0
2014	0	0
2015	1	0
Total	2	0
