= Shinobu Ohno =

Japanese footballer (born 1984)

Shinobu Ohno 大野 忍
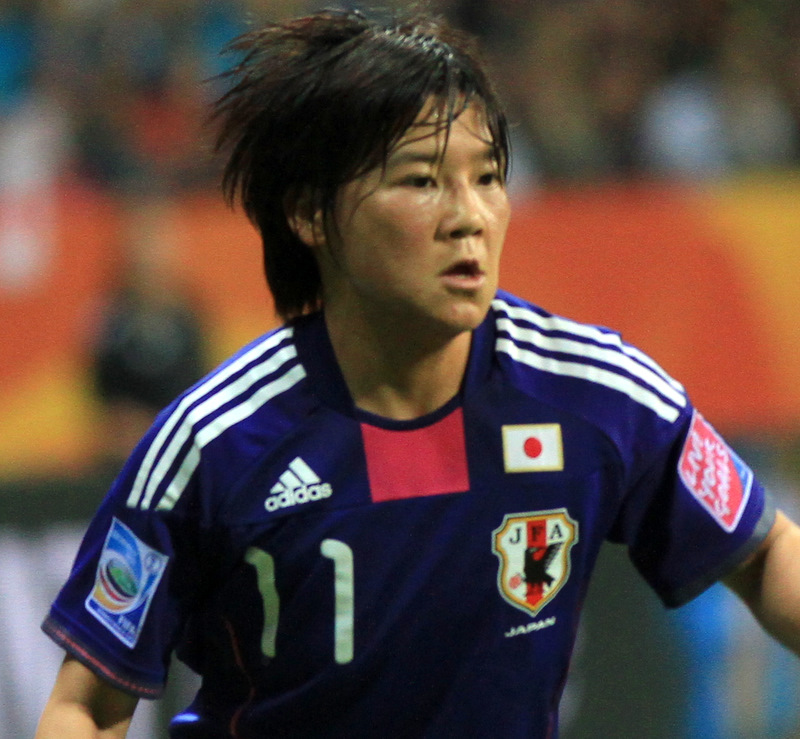
- Ohno playing for Japan in the 2011 World Cup

Personal information
- Date of birth: 23 January 1984 (age 42)
- Place of birth: Zama, Kanagawa, Japan
- Height: 1.56 m (5 ft 1 in)
- Position: Forward

Senior career*
Years	Team	Apps	(Gls)
1999–2010	Nippon TV Beleza	192	(136)
2011–2012	INAC Kobe Leonessa	34	(25)
2013	Olympique Lyonnais	5	(0)
2013	AS Elfen Sayama FC	8	(2)
2014	Arsenal	10	(0)
2015–2017	INAC Kobe Leonessa	55	(15)
2018–2019	Nojima Stella Kanagawa Sagamihara	16	(2)
Total		320	(180)

International career
2002	Japan U20	4	(3)
2003–2016	Japan	139	(40)
Medal record
Nippon TV Beleza
Winner	Nadeshiko League	2000
Winner	Nadeshiko League	2001
Winner	Nadeshiko League	2002
Winner	Nadeshiko League	2005
Winner	Nadeshiko League	2006
Winner	Nadeshiko League	2007
Winner	Nadeshiko League	2008
Winner	Nadeshiko League	2010
Runner-up	Nadeshiko League	1999
Runner-up	Nadeshiko League	2003
Runner-up	Nadeshiko League	2004
Runner-up	Nadeshiko League	2009
Winner	Nadeshiko League Cup	1999
Winner	Nadeshiko League Cup	2007
Winner	Nadeshiko League Cup	2010
Winner	Empress's Cup	2000
Winner	Empress's Cup	2004
Winner	Empress's Cup	2005
Winner	Empress's Cup	2007
Winner	Empress's Cup	2008
Winner	Empress's Cup	2009
Runner-up	Empress's Cup	2002
Runner-up	Empress's Cup	2003
INAC Kobe Leonessa
Winner	Nadeshiko League	2011
Winner	Nadeshiko League	2012
Runner-up	Nadeshiko League	2016
Runner-up	Nadeshiko League	2017
Runner-up	Nadeshiko League Cup	2012
Winner	Empress's Cup	2011
Winner	Empress's Cup	2012
Winner	Empress's Cup	2015
Winner	Empress's Cup	2016
Representing Japan
Olympic Games
Silver medal – second place	2012 London	Team
FIFA Women's World Cup
Gold medal – first place	2011 Germany
Silver medal – second place	2015 Canada
AFC Women's Asian Cup
Bronze medal – third place	2008 Vietnam
Bronze medal – third place	2010 China
Asian Games
Gold medal – first place	2010 Guangzhou	Team
Silver medal – second place	2006 Doha	Team
AFC U-19 Women's Championship
Gold medal – first place	2002 India
- * Club domestic league appearances and goals as of 31 December 2018

Shinobu Ohno (大野 忍, Ōno Shinobu; born 23 January 1984) is a Japanese former footballer who played as a forward. She formerly played for the Japan national team.

== Club career ==
Ohno was born in Zama on 23 January 1984. She played for Nippon TV Beleza from 1999 to 2010. In 12 seasons, she played 192 matches and scored 136 goals. She was the top scorer in three seasons (2007, 2008 and 2010) and she was selected for most-valuable player awards 3 times (2005, 2007 and 2010). She was also selected Best Eleven 8 times (2001, 2002, 2005, 2006, 2007, 2008, 2009 and 2010). The club won L.League championship 8 times and 2nd position 4 times. In 2011, she moved to INAC Kobe Leonessa and she became top scorer with teammate Nahomi Kawasumi. From 2013, she played for Olympique Lyonnais (2013), AS Elfen Sayama FC (2013), Arsenal (2014) and INAC Kobe Leonessa (2015–2017). She is currently playing for Nojima Stella Kanagawa Sagamihara from 2018.

== International career ==
In August 2002, Ohno was selected Japan U-20 national team for 2002 U-19 World Championship. She played 4 games and scored 3 goals. On 12 January 2003, she debuted for Japan national team against United States. Her first major tournament was the 2006 Asian Cup, where Japan placed fourth. The following year she played in the 2007 World Cup, but Japan fell in the group stage. She also competed at the 2008 Summer Olympics, and the 2011 World Cup, where she scored a goal in the group stage match against Mexico as Japan won the championship. Ohno started the final against the United States. She then competed for the Japanese silver medal-winning team at the 2012 Summer Olympics. At 2015 World Cup, Japan won 2nd position. At 2016 AFC Women's Olympic Qualifying Tournament, following Japan's failure to qualify for the 2016 Summer Olympics. This tournament became her last match for Japan. She played 139 games and scored 40 goals for Japan until 2016.

== Career statistics ==
=== Club ===
As of 20 January 2015

Appearances and goals by club, season and competition
Club	Season	League		National cup		League cup		Continental (Note: Includes UEFA Women's Champions League.)		Total	
Club	Season	Apps	Goals	Apps	Goals	Apps	Goals	Apps	Goals	Apps	Goals
Nippon TV Beleza	1999	5	0					–			
Nippon TV Beleza	2000	11	2			–		–			
Nippon TV Beleza	2001	14	10			–		–			
Nippon TV Beleza	2002	10	8			–		–			
Nippon TV Beleza	2003	20	12	4	3	–		–		24	15
Nippon TV Beleza	2004	14	5			–		–			
Nippon TV Beleza	2005	21	24	5	2	–		–		26	6
Nippon TV Beleza	2006	16	8	3	3	–		–		19	11
Nippon TV Beleza	2007	21	23	4	5	2	1	–		27	29
Nippon TV Beleza	2008	21	20	4	3	–		–		25	23
Nippon TV Beleza	2009	21	11	4	4	–		–		25	15
Nippon TV Beleza	2010	18	13	1	0	6	3	–		25	16
Nippon TV Beleza	Total	192	136	25	20	8	4	–		225	160
INAC Kobe Leonessa	2011	16	12	4	0	–		–		20	12
INAC Kobe Leonessa	2012	18	13	3	0	5	0	–		26	13
INAC Kobe Leonessa	Total	34	25	7	0	5	0	–		46	25
Olympique Lyonnais	2012–13	5	0	2	1	–		0	0	7	1
Arsenal	2014	10	0	4	1	6	2	2	0	22	3
Career total		241	161	38	22	19	6	2	0	300	189

=== International ===
Appearances and goals by national team and year
National team	Year	Apps	Goals
Japan	2003	5	2
Japan	2004	1	3
Japan	2005	7	1
Japan	2006	16	4
Japan	2007	17	8
Japan	2008	19	7
Japan	2009	3	2
Japan	2010	12	6
Japan	2011	17	3
Japan	2012	15	2
Japan	2013	7	1
Japan	2014	6	0
Japan	2015	12	0
Japan	2016	2	1
Total		139	40

Scores and results list Japan's goal tally first, score column indicates score after each Ohno goal.

List of international goals scored by Shinobu Ohno
No.	Date	Venue	Opponent	Score	Result	Competition
1	19 March 2003	Bangkok, Thailand	Thailand	Unknown	9–0	Friendly match
2	19 March 2003	Bangkok, Thailand	Thailand	Unknown	9–0	Friendly match
3	18 December 2004	Nishigaoka Soccer Stadium, Tokyo, Japan	Chinese Taipei	3–0	11–0	Friendly match
4	18 December 2004	Nishigaoka Soccer Stadium, Tokyo, Japan	Chinese Taipei	5–0	11–0	Friendly match
5	18 December 2004	Nishigaoka Soccer Stadium, Tokyo, Japan	Chinese Taipei	8–0	11–0	Friendly match
6	23 July 2005	Nishigaoka Soccer Stadium, Tokyo, Japan	Australia	2–2	4–2	Friendly match
7	19 July 2006	Hindmarsh Stadium, Adelaide, Australia	Chinese Taipei	1–0	11–1	2006 AFC Women's Asian Cup
8	19 November 2006	Fukuda Denshi Arena, Chiba, Japan	Australia	1–0	1–0	Friendly match
9	23 November 2006	Wildparkstadion, Karlsruhe, Germany	Germany	1–3	3–6	Friendly match
10	4 December 2006	Al-Gharafa Stadium, Doha, Qatar	Thailand	2–0	4–0	2006 Asian Games
11	9 February 2007	Makario Stadium, Nicosia, Cyprus	Norway	1–0	1–0	Friendly match
12	15 April 2007	Thai Army Sports Stadium, Bangkok, Thailand	Thailand	3–0	4–0	2008 Summer Olympics Qualifiers
13	15 April 2007	Thai Army Sports Stadium, Bangkok, Thailand	Thailand	4–0	4–0	2008 Summer Olympics Qualifiers
14	3 June 2007	National Olympic Stadium, Tokyo, Japan	South Korea	2–0	6–1	2008 Summer Olympics Qualifiers
15	10 June 2007	Bucheon Stadium, Bucheon, South Korea	South Korea	1–1	2–2	2008 Summer Olympics Qualifiers
16	4 August 2007	Lạch Tray Stadium, Hai Phong, Vietnam	Vietnam	3–0	8–0	2008 Summer Olympics Qualifiers
17	4 August 2007	Lạch Tray Stadium, Hai Phong, Vietnam	Vietnam	5–0	8–0	2008 Summer Olympics Qualifiers
18	12 August 2007	National Olympic Stadium, Tokyo, Japan	Thailand	1–0	5–0	2008 Summer Olympics Qualifiers
19	21 February 2008	Yongchuan Stadium, Chongqing, China	South Korea	2–0	2–0	2008 EAFF Women's Football Championship
20	24 February 2008	Yongchuan Stadium, Chongqing, China	China	1–0	3–0	2008 EAFF Women's Football Championship
21	24 February 2008	Yongchuan Stadium, Chongqing, China	China	2–0	3–0	2008 EAFF Women's Football Championship
22	10 March 2008	Dasaki Stadium, Achna, Cyprus	Russia	2–1	3–1	2008 Cyprus Cup
23	29 July 2008	National Olympic Stadium, Tokyo, Japan	Argentina	1–0	2–0	Friendly match
24	12 August 2008	Shanghai Stadium, Shanghai, China	Norway	3–1	5–1	2008 Summer Olympics
25	18 August 2008	Workers Stadium, Beijing, China	Germany	1–0	2–4	2008 Summer Olympics
26	1 August 2009	Montargis, France	France	1–0	4–0	Friendly match
27	14 November 2009	Urawa Komaba Stadium, Saitama, Japan	New Zealand	2–0	2–1	Friendly match
28	13 February 2010	Ajinomoto Stadium, Chōfu, Japan	South Korea	1–0	2–1	2010 EAFF Women's Football Championship
29	8 May 2010	Matsumoto Stadium, Matsumoto, Japan	Mexico	3–0	4–0	Friendly match
30	8 May 2010	Matsumoto Stadium, Matsumoto, Japan	Mexico	4–0	4–0	Friendly match
31	11 May 2010	Niigata Stadium, Niigata, Japan	Mexico	1–0	3–0	Friendly match
32	14 November 2010	Huangpu Sports Center, Guangzhou, China	Thailand	2–0	4–0	2010 Asian Games
33	20 November 2010	Yuexiushan Stadium, Guangzhou, China	China	1–0	1–0	2010 Asian Games
34	4 March 2011	Lagos, Portugal	Finland	1–0	5–0	2011 Algarve Cup
35	1 July 2011	BayArena, Leverkusen, Germany	Mexico	2–0	4–0	2011 FIFA Women's World Cup
36	3 September 2011	Jinan Olympic Sports Center, Jinan, China	South Korea	2–1	2–1	2012 Summer Olympics Qualifiers
37	2 March 2012	Parchal, Portugal	Denmark	2–0	2–0	2012 Algarve Cup
38	3 August 2012	Millennium Stadium, Cardiff, United Kingdom	Brazil	2–0	2–0	2012 Summer Olympics
39	29 June 2013	Allianz Arena, Munich, Germany	Germany	1–1	2–4	Friendly match
40	7 March 2016	Kincho Stadium, Osaka, Japan	Vietnam	2–1	6–1	2016 Summer Olympics qualifiers

== Honors ==
National Team

- FIFA Women's World Cup

Champion: 2011

- Asian Games

Gold Medal: 2010

- East Asian Football Championship

Champions: 2008, 2010

Club

- L.League

Champions (10): 2000, 2001, 2002, 2005, 2006, 2007, 2008, 2010, 2011, 2012

- Empress's Cup

Champions (8): 2000, 2004, 2005, 2007, 2008, 2009, 2011, 2012

- Nadeshiko League Cup

Champions: 2007, 2010

- Japan and South Korea Women's League Championship

Champions: 2012

- Women's FA Cup

Champions: 2014

Individual

- FIFA Women's World Cup

All-Star Team: 2011

- L.League Division 1

Best Player: 2005, 2007, 2010
Top scorers: 2007, 2008, 2010, 2011
Best Eleven (9): 2001, 2002, 2005, 2006, 2007, 2008, 2009, 2010, 2011
