= Nahomi Kawasumi =

Japanese footballer (born 1985)

Nahomi Kawasumi 川澄 奈穂美
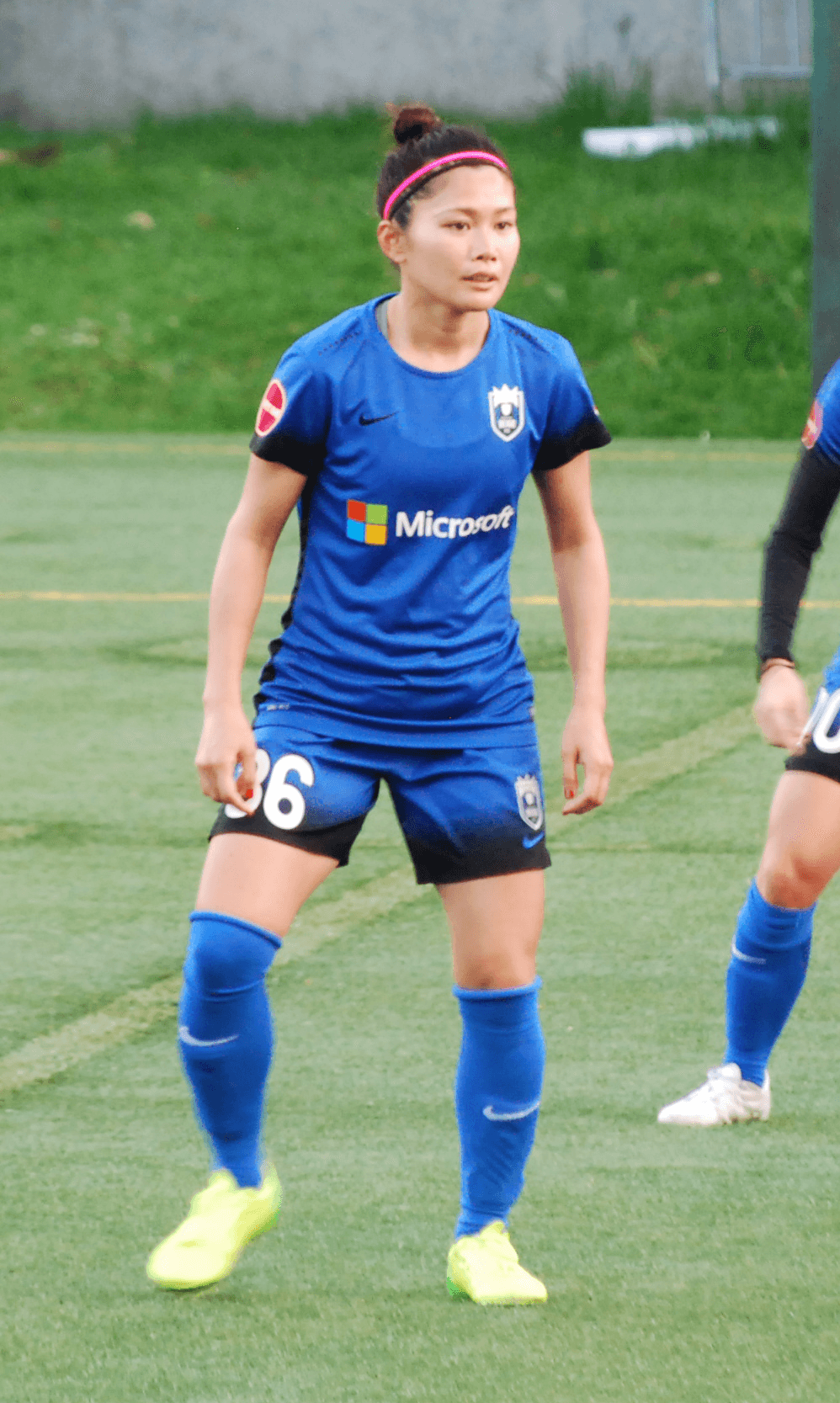
- Kawasumi, April 2017

Personal information
- Full name: Nahomi Kawasumi
- Date of birth: 23 September 1985 (age 41)
- Place of birth: Yamato, Kanagawa, Japan
- Height: 1.57 m (5 ft 2 in)
- Positions: Forward; midfielder

Team information
- Current team: Albirex Niigata Ladies
- Number: 9

Youth career
- 1998–2003: Yamato Sylphid
- 2004–2007: Nippon Sport Science University

Senior career*
Years	Team	Apps	(Gls)
2008–2016	INAC Kobe Leonessa	144	(58)
2014	→ Seattle Reign FC (loan)	22	(9)
2016–2018	Seattle Reign FC	48	(9)
2016	→ INAC Kobe Leonessa (loan)	11	(2)
2019–2023	NJ/NY Gotham FC	66	(2)
2020	→ INAC Kobe Leonessa (loan)	9	(0)
2023–	Albirex Niigata Ladies	60	(6)

International career^{‡}
2008–2018	Japan	90	(20)
Medal record
Women's football
Representing Japan
FIFA Women's World Cup
Winner	2011 Germany
Runner-up	2015 Canada
Olympic Games
Silver medal – second place	2012 London	Team
AFC Women's Asian Cup
Winner	2014 Vietnam
Winner	2018 Jordan
Bronze medal – third place	2008 Vietnam
Bronze medal – third place	2010 China
Asian Games
Gold medal – first place	2010 Guangzhou	Team
Silver medal – second place	2014 Incheon	Team
- * Club domestic league appearances and goals as of 09:12, 6 April 2026 (UTC) ‡ National team caps and goals as of 18:02, 23 February 2023 (UTC)

Nahomi Kawasumi (川澄 奈穂美, Kawasumi Nahomi; born 23 September 1985) is a Japanese professional footballer who plays either as a midfielder or forward for WE League club Albirex Niigata. She had represented the Japan national team in the 2011 and 2015 FIFA World Cups, winning the 2011 edition of the tournament and finish as runner-up in the 2015 edition. She had also won silver at the 2012 London Olympics. During the 2011 World Cup, she scored two goals—including a lob at 35 yards away against Sweden during the semifinals—helping Japan eventually win the tournament for the first time in its history.

== Early life ==
Kawasumi was raised in Kanagawa Prefecture about 40 minutes south of Tokyo where she began playing soccer as a youth following the lead of her older sister. She played for the Rinkan Lemons while in elementary school along with future Japanese national team defender Megumi Kamionobe. Kawasumi and Kamionobe scored approximately 70% of the team's goals. Kawasumi attended Nippon Sport Science University.

== Club career ==
=== INAC Kobe Leonessa ===
Kawasumi signed with INAC Kobe Leonessa in 2008. In 2011, she was named the league's most valuable player after captaining INAC to its first league championship title. The team finished the 2011 season with a 12–3–0 record and 39 points.

During the 2013 season, Kawasumi was named the league's most valuable player for a second time. Her twelve goals were second only to her teammate Beverly Goebel. She was also named to the league's Best Eleven team for the fourth year in a row. INAC finished first in the league with a 16–0–2 record securing their third championship in three consecutive years. Their 48 points were 10 more than second place team Nippon TV Beleza.

During the 2013 International Women's Club Championship, Kawasumi scored INAC's second goal during their 3–0 semi-final win against Chilean team, Colo-Colo Femenino. INAC Kobe won the tournament with a 4–2 win over Chelsea L.F.C. in the final.

In September 2014, Kawasumi returned to INAC Kobe Leonessa after she finished the 2014 NWSL season for Seattle Reign FC on loan.

==== Seattle Reign FC (loan) ====
In February 2014, Kawasumi signed with Seattle Reign FC on loan for the 2014 National Women's Soccer League season. After scoring two goals including the game-winning goal against the Boston Breakers to lift Seattle to a 3–2 win on 6 July 2014, Kawasumi was named NWSL Player of the Week. A few weeks later during a match against the 2013 champions Portland Thorns FC, Kawasumi scored two goals and served an assist to help the Reign win 5–0. She was subsequently named NWSL Player of the Week for the second time during week 16 of the season. Kawasumi finished the 2014 season, having scored 9 goals and provided 5 assists. And she was selected to the NWSL Best XI for the 2014 Season.

=== Seattle Reign FC ===
In June 2016, Kawasumi re-signed with NWSL club Seattle Reign FC. Kawasumi scored a brace on her debut against the Boston Breakers just days after re-signing, earning her NWSL Player of the Week honors. Despite her efforts, the Reign finished fifth in the 2016 NWSL season, missing the play-offs for the first time in three years. Kawasumi played in all ten matches for the Reign after re-signing, starting eight and scoring three goals.

On 13 May 2017, Kawasumi set a new NWSL single-game record with four assists in a 6–2 win over the Washington Spirit. She continued her good run of form in the rest of the 2017 season, playing in all 24 games and scoring six goals. Despite her contribution, Seattle again finished fifth and missed the play-offs.

Following the arrival of new head coach Vlatko Andonovski, Kawasumi saw her playing time diminish and finished the 2018 season scoreless. During the offseason, Kawasumi asked for a trade to maximize her playing time ahead of the 2019 FIFA Women's World Cup and the 2020 Summer Olympics in her home country.

==== INAC Kobe Leonessa (loan) ====
Following the conclusion of 2016 NWSL season, Kawasumi signed with former club INAC Kobe Leonessa on loan for the rest of its 2016 L.League season. She helped the club win the 2016 Empress's Cup despite not playing in the final.

=== NJ/NY Gotham FC ===
On 15 January 2019, Seattle Reign FC traded Kawasumi to fellow NWSL club Sky Blue FC (later NJ/NY Gotham FC) in exchange for American forward Shea Groom. On 8 July 2023, Kawasumi and Gotham mutually agreed to terminate her contract.

=== Albirex Niigata ===
On 23 July 2023, Kawasumi returned to Japan to sign with WE League club Albirex Niigata.

== International career ==
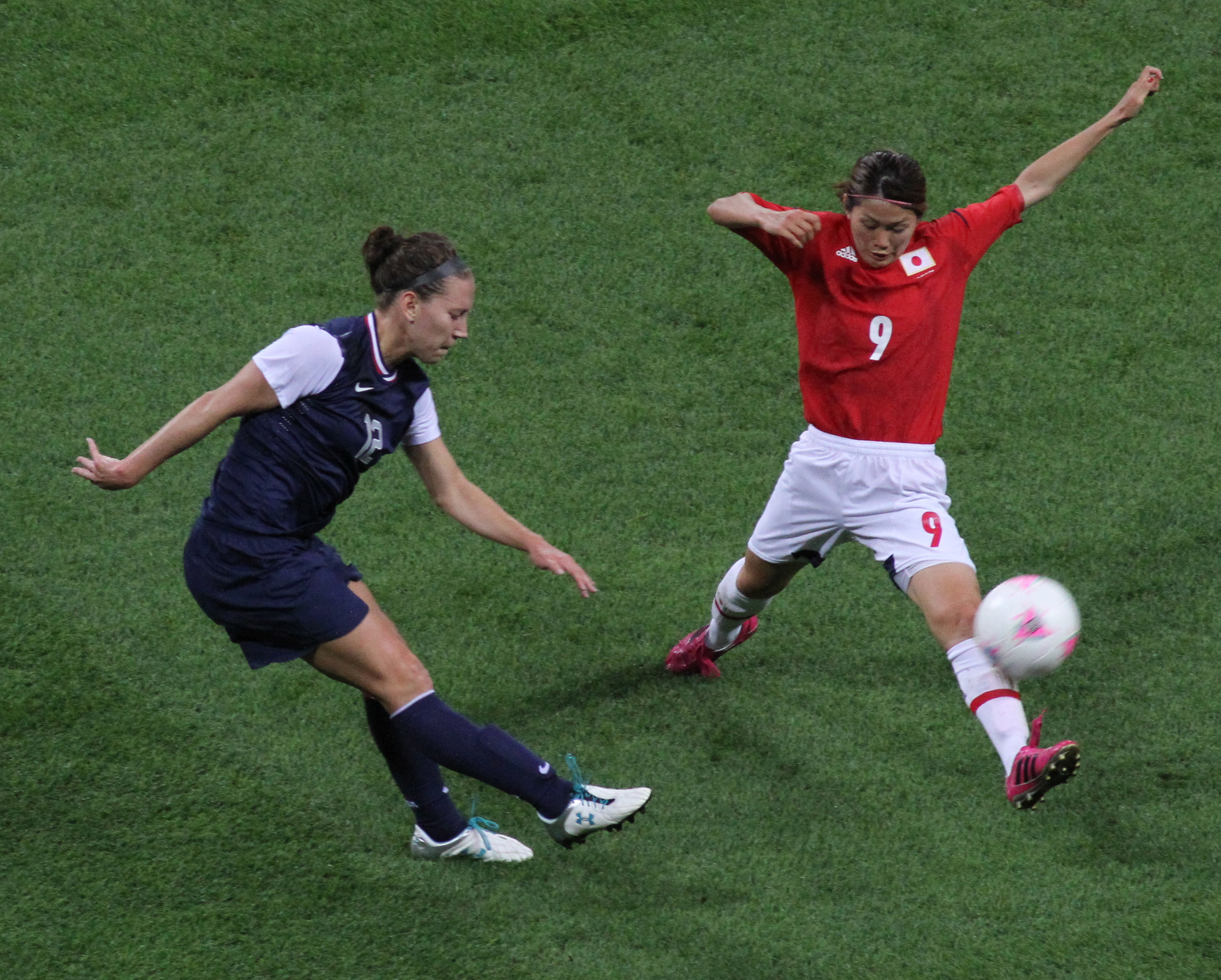
Kawasumi (right) during the 2012 Summer Olympics gold medal match against the United States.

=== Senior ===
Kawasumi began playing for the Japan national team, also known as Nadeshiko Japan, in 2008. She scored her first international goal against Finland at the 2011 Algarve Cup.

During the semi-final match of the 2011 World Cup against Sweden, Kawasumi scored two goals helping Japan win 3–1 and advance to the final against the United States. Kawasumi was in the starting line-up for the first time during the game and scored the equalizer in the 18th minute and the game-winning goal in the 64th. Japan eventually defeated the United States in penalty kicks to clinch the gold medal.

Kawasumi was named to Japan's roster for the 2012 London Olympics and scored her first goal of the tournament during the team' first group stage match against Canada. Japan defeated Canada 2–1. Japan finished second in their group after tying both Sweden and South Africa 0–0. After defeating Brazil 2–0 in the quarter-finals, Japan faced France in the semi-finals and won 2–1 advancing to the final. The team was defeated 2–1 by the United States in the final earning Japan a silver medal at the tournament. Kawasumi finished the tournament having played in every match for Japan and scoring one goal.

Kawasumi remained an integral part of the Nadeshiko side, helping the team finish runners-up in the 2015 FIFA Women's World Cup. Her cross forced a last-minute own goal by English defender Laura Bassett and sent Japan into the final.

Following Japan's failed qualification to the 2016 Summer Olympics, new national team head coach Asako Takakura left off many veterans (including Kawasumi) in favor of younger players. However, Kawasumi was surprisingly recalled to the Nadeshiko in March 2018, following a two-year absence. Her experience helped the team lift the 2018 AFC Women's Asian Cup. Faced with a real chance to make Japan's 2019 FIFA Women's World Cup roster and with playing time diminished at Seattle Reign FC, Kawasumi requested a trade and joined Sky Blue FC in January 2019.

== Off the pitch ==
Kawasumi has appeared in commercials for CalorieMate, Toyota, and skin care line Acnelogy.

== Career statistics ==
=== Club ===
As of match played 5 April 2026

Appearances and goals by club, season and competition
Club	Season	League			National cup (Note: Empress's Cup)		League cup (Note: includes Nadeshiko League Cup, NWSL Challenge Cup, WE League Cup)		Total	
Club	Season	Division	Apps	Goals	Apps	Goals	Apps	Goals	Apps	Goals
INAC Kobe Leonessa	2008	Nadeshiko League	21	3	4	2	—		25	5
INAC Kobe Leonessa	2009	Nadeshiko League	21	10	3	0	—		24	10
INAC Kobe Leonessa	2010	Nadeshiko League	18	8	4	2	5	2	27	12
INAC Kobe Leonessa	2011	Nadeshiko League	16	12	4	2	—		20	14
INAC Kobe Leonessa	2012	Nadeshiko League	18	8	4	1	5	2	27	11
INAC Kobe Leonessa	2013	Nadeshiko League	18	12	4	2	10	5	32	19
INAC Kobe Leonessa	2014	Nadeshiko League	9	1	2	0	—		11	1
INAC Kobe Leonessa	2015	Nadeshiko League	23	4	5	1	—		28	5
INAC Kobe Leonessa	Total		144	58	30	10	20	9	194	77
Seattle Reign FC (loan)	2014	NWSL	22	9	—		—		22	9
Seattle Reign FC	2016	NWSL	10	3	—		—		10	3
Seattle Reign FC	2017	NWSL	24	6	—		—		24	6
Seattle Reign FC	2018	NWSL	14	0	—		—		14	0
Seattle Reign FC	Total		70	18	0	0	0	0	70	18
INAC Kobe Leonessa (loan)	2016	Nadeshiko League	11	2	1	0	3	0	15	2
NJ/NY Gotham FC	2019	NWSL	19	0	—		—		19	0
NJ/NY Gotham FC	2020	NWSL	— (Note: Season cancelled due to COVID-19 pandemic)		—		6	1	6	1
NJ/NY Gotham FC	2021	NWSL	24	1	—		5	0	29	1
NJ/NY Gotham FC	2022	NWSL	20	1	—		6	1	26	2
NJ/NY Gotham FC	2023	NWSL	4	0	—		0	0	4	0
NJ/NY Gotham FC	Total		66	2	0	0	17	2	84	4
INAC Kobe Leonessa (loan)	2020	Nadeshiko League	9	0	1	0	—		10	0
Albirex Niigata	2023–24	WE League	20	3	2	1	6	0	28	4
Albirex Niigata	2024–25	WE League	22	2	4	0	5	0	31	2
Albirex Niigata	2025–26	WE League	18	1	3	0	6	0	27	1
Albirex Niigata	Total		60	6	9	1	17	0	86	7
Career total			361	86	41	11	59	11	459	108

=== International ===
As of 2 August 2018

Appearances and goals by national team and year
National Team	Year	Apps	Goals
Japan	2008	1	0
Japan	2009	2	0
Japan	2010	7	0
Japan	2011	13	6
Japan	2012	16	3
Japan	2013	11	3
Japan	2014	17	6
Japan	2015	11	1
Japan	2016	4	1
Japan	2017	0	0
Japan	2018	8	0
Total		90	20

Scores and results list Japan's goal tally first, score column indicates score after each Kawasumi goal.

List of international goals scored by Nahomi Kawasumi
No.	Date	Venue	Opponent	Score	Result	Competition
1	4 March 2011	Lagos, Portugal	Finland	2–0	5–0	2011 Algarve Cup
2	9 March 2011	Parchal, Portugal	Sweden |	1–2	1–2	2011 Algarve Cup
3	13 July 2011	Commerzbank-Arena, Frankfurt, Germany	Sweden	1–1	3–1	2011 FIFA Women's World Cup
4	13 July 2011	Commerzbank-Arena, Frankfurt, Germany	Sweden	3–1	3–1	2011 FIFA Women's World Cup
5	1 September 2011	Shandong Provincial Stadium, Jinan, China	Thailand	1–0	3–0	2012 Summer Olympics qualification
6	5 September 2011	Shandong Provincial Stadium, Jinan, China	Australia	1–0	1–0	2012 Summer Olympics qualification
7	29 February 2012	Parchal, Portugal	Norway	2–1	2–1	2012 Algarve Cup
8	7 March 2012	Estádio Algarve, Faro, Portugal	Germany	1–2	3–4	2012 Algarve Cup
9	25 July 2012	City of Coventry Stadium, Coventry, United Kingdom	Canada	1–0	2–1	2012 Summer Olympics
10	11 March 2013	Estádio Algarve, Faro, Portugal	Denmark	2–0	2–0	2013 Algarve Cup
11	26 June 2013	Pirelli Stadium, Burton upon Trent, England	England	1–1	1–1	Friendly Match
12	22 September 2013	Nagasaki Athletic Stadium, Isahaya, Japan	Nigeria	2–0	2–0	Friendly Match
13	26 May 2014	Thống Nhất Stadium, Ho Chi Minh City, Vietnam	Vietnam	1–0	4–0	2014 AFC Women's Asian Cup
14	26 May 2014	Thống Nhất Stadium, Ho Chi Minh City, Vietnam	Vietnam	4–0	4–0	2014 AFC Women's Asian Cup
15	18 September 2014	Namdong Asiad Rugby Field, Incheon, South Korea	Jordan	1–0	12–0	2014 Asian Games
16	18 September 2014	Namdong Asiad Rugby Field, Incheon, South Korea	Jordan	12–0	12–0	2014 Asian Games
17	22 September 2014	Incheon Munhak Stadium, Incheon, South Korea	Chinese Taipei	0–3	0–3	2014 Asian Games
18	28 October 2014	Commonwealth Stadium, Edmonton, Canada	Canada	0–3	0–3	Friendly Match
19	9 March 2015	Stadium Bela Vista, Parchal, Portugal	France	1–0	1–3	2015 Algarve Cup
20	7 March 2016	Kincho Stadium, Osaka, Japan	Vietnam	3–1	6–1	2016 AFC Women's Olympic Qualifying Tournament

== Honours ==
INAC Kobe Leonessa

- Nadeshiko League: 2011, 2012, 2013
- Empress's Cup: 2010, 2011, 2012, 2013, 2015, 2016
- Nadeshiko League Cup: 2013
- International Women's Club Championship: 2013

Seattle Reign FC

- NWSL Shield (regular season winners): 2014

Japan

- FIFA Women's World Cup: 2011
- FIFA Women's World Cup Runner-Up: 2015
- Olympic Games Silver Medal: 2012
- AFC Women's Asian Cup: 2014, 2018
- Asian Games: 2010
- Summer Universiade: 2005

Individual

- Japan Women's Football League

MVP: 2011, 2013
Top Scorers (1): 2011
Best XI: 2010, 2011, 2012, 2013

- NWSL

Player of the Week: Week 13, Week 16 (2014 season); Week 11 (2016 season); Week 5 (2017 season)
Best XI: 2014
