= 2010 Nadeshiko League Cup =

Statistics of Nadeshiko League Cup in the 2010 season.

== Overview ==
Nippon TV Beleza won the championship.

== Results ==
=== Qualifying round ===
==== Group A ====
Pos	Team	Pld	W	D	L	GF	GA	GD	Pts
1	Urawa Reds Ladies	4	4	0	0	8	2	+6	12
2	TEPCO Mareeze	4	3	0	1	10	3	+7	9
3	Albirex Niigata Ladies	4	2	0	2	7	6	+1	6
4	JEF United Chiba Ladies	4	1	0	3	3	9	−6	3
5	Iga FC Kunoichi	4	0	0	4	3	11	−8	0

==== Group B ====
Pos	Team	Pld	W	D	L	GF	GA	GD	Pts
1	Nippon TV Beleza	4	3	1	0	13	4	+9	10
2	INAC Kobe Leonessa	4	2	2	0	8	4	+4	8
3	Okayama Yunogo Belle	4	2	0	2	3	6	−3	6
4	Fukuoka J. Anclas	4	1	1	2	9	8	+1	4
5	AS Elfen Sayama FC	4	0	0	4	1	12	−11	0

=== Final round ===
==== Semifinals ====
- Urawa Reds Ladies 3-2 INAC Kobe Leonessa
- Nippon TV Beleza 1-0 TEPCO Mareeze

==== Final ====
- Urawa Reds Ladies 2-3 Nippon TV Beleza
