= All Japan Women's University Football Championship =

- Founded: 1992; 34 years ago
- Region: Japan
- Teams: 24
- Current champions: Nippon Sport Science University (2024, 19th title)
- Most championships: Nippon Sport Science University (19 titles)
- Website: JFA

The All Japan Women's University Football Championship (全日本大学女子サッカー選手権大会, Zen'nihon daigaku joshi sakkā senshuken taikai), is a women's football competition for universities across Japan. Under the same format as the men's university championship, it's currently held with 24 participating university teams. The competition was for the first time held on 1992, following the beginning of football professionalization in Japan and the intent of developing football to a high level in both men's and women's football, also including the youth championship. The championship is organized by the Japan Football Association and the Japan University Women Football Association.

== Past winners ==
Past winners are:

Year	Winner	Result	Runners-up
1992	Nippon Sport Science University	2–1	Osaka University HSS Junior College
1993	Nippon Sport Science University	2–1 (a.e.t.)	Japan Women's College of Physical Education
1994	Osaka University HSS Junior College	1–0	Nippon Sport Science University
1995	Nippon Sport Science University	2–1	Japan Women's College of Physical Education
1996	Nippon Sport Science University	0–0 (5–4 pen.)	Japan Women's College of Physical Education
1997	Nippon Sport Science University	4–0	Tokyo Women's College of Physical Education
1998	Nippon Sport Science University	2–1	Musashigaoka College
1999	Osaka University of Health and Sport Sciences	0–0 (6–5 pen.)	Japan Women's College of Physical Education
2000	Nippon Sport Science University	6–0	Tokyo Women's College of Physical Education
2001	Nippon Sport Science University	3–1	Japan Women's College of Physical Education
2002	Nippon Sport Science University	1–0	Tokyo Women's College of Physical Education
2003	Nippon Sport Science University	2–0	Tokyo Women's College of Physical Education
2004	Nippon Sport Science University	4–1	Musashigaoka College
2005	Waseda University	2–1	Tokyo Women's College of Physical Education
2006	Osaka University of Health and Sport Sciences	1–0	Nippon Sport Science University
2007	Nippon Sport Science University	3–1	Osaka University of Health and Sport Sciences
2008	Nippon Sport Science University	2–0	Waseda University
2009	Waseda University	2–1	Kanagawa University
2010	Waseda University	4–1	Musashigaoka College
2011	Nippon Sport Science University; Kanagawa University	1–1 (a.e.t.)	Shared trophy
2012	Nippon Sport Science University	2–1	Waseda University
2013	Kibi International University	2–1 (a.e.t.)	University of Tsukuba
2014	Nippon Sport Science University	0–0 (4–2 pen.)	Osaka University of Health and Sport Sciences
2015	Waseda University	2–1	Kanagawa University
2016	Waseda University	2–1	Nippon Sport Science University
2017	Waseda University	1–0	Kanagawa University
2018	Nippon Sport Science University	1–0	Waseda University
2019	Nippon Sport Science University	2–0	Waseda University
2020	Teikyo Heisei University	1–0	Shizuoka Sangyo University
2021	Waseda University	1–0	Shizuoka Sangyo University
2022	Toyo University	1–0	Yamanashi Gakuin University
2023	Yamanashi Gakuin University	3–2	Waseda University
2024	Nippon Sport Science University	2–1	Yamanashi Gakuin University

== See also ==
- Football in Japan
- Women's football in Japan
- Japan Football Association (JFA)
- Japanese association football league system
- WE League (I)
- Nadeshiko League
  - Nadeshiko League Division 1 (II)
  - Nadeshiko League Division 2 (III)
- Regional Leagues (IV)
- Empress's Cup (National Cup)
- Nadeshiko League Cup (League Cup)
