= 2013 in Japanese football =

2013 season

Japanese football in 2013.

== Promotion and relegation ==
Teams relegated from J. League Division 1

- Vissel Kobe
- Gamba Osaka
- Consadole Sapporo

Teams promoted to J. League Division 1

- Ventforet Kofu
- Shonan Bellmare
- Oita Trinita

Teams relegated from J. League Division 2

- Machida Zelvia

Teams promoted to J. League Division 2

- V-Varen Nagasaki

== J. League Division 1 ==
Sanfrecce Hiroshima won another J. League title, raising its total league titles to seven. Yokohama F. Marinos led the campaign in the latter half of the seasons, only to lose the last two matches to Albirex Niigata and Kawasaki Frontale respectively, thus settling for second place. Frontale won third place as a result of their victory, qualifying for the AFC Champions League for the first time since 2009.

Oita Trinita, who had been promoted via the playoffs as sixth place, showed their poor preparation throughout the campaign and ended in bottom place. Júbilo Iwata was relegated as well after 20 seasons in Division 1, while Shonan Bellmare, who had been promoted with them in 1994 and was making a cameo appearance, went down with them as well.

Pos	Team	Pld	W	D	L	GF	GA	GD	Pts	Qualification or relegation
1	Sanfrecce Hiroshima (C)	34	19	6	9	51	29	+22	63	Qualification for 2014 AFC Champions League group stage (Note: The winners of the 2013 Emperor's Cup qualify for the group stage of the 2014 AFC Champions League. As the Emperor's Cup winners were Yokohama F. Marinos, who had already qualified to ACL through the championship, the remaining spot was awarded to the fourth-placed team.)
2	Yokohama F. Marinos	34	18	8	8	49	31	+18	62	Qualification for 2014 AFC Champions League group stage
3	Kawasaki Frontale	34	18	6	10	65	51	+14	60	Qualification for 2014 AFC Champions League group stage
4	Cerezo Osaka	34	16	11	7	53	32	+21	59	Qualification for 2014 AFC Champions League group stage
5	Kashima Antlers	34	18	5	11	60	52	+8	59	
6	Urawa Red Diamonds	34	17	7	10	66	56	+10	58	
7	Albirex Niigata	34	17	4	13	48	42	+6	55	
8	FC Tokyo	34	16	6	12	61	47	+14	54	
9	Shimizu S-Pulse	34	15	5	14	48	57	−9	50	
10	Kashiwa Reysol	34	13	9	12	56	59	−3	48	
11	Nagoya Grampus	34	13	8	13	47	48	−1	47	
12	Sagan Tosu	34	13	7	14	54	63	−9	46	
13	Vegalta Sendai	34	11	12	11	41	38	+3	45	
14	Omiya Ardija	34	14	3	17	45	48	−3	45	
15	Ventforet Kofu	34	8	13	13	30	41	−11	37	
16	Shonan Bellmare (R)	34	6	7	21	34	62	−28	25	Relegation to 2014 J.League Division 2
17	Júbilo Iwata (R)	34	4	11	19	40	56	−16	23	Relegation to 2014 J.League Division 2
18	Oita Trinita (R)	34	2	8	24	31	67	−36	14	Relegation to 2014 J.League Division 2

Updated to match(es) played on 7 December 2013. Source: J.League Division 1
Rules for classification: 1) points; 2) goal difference; 3) number of goals scored.
(C) Champions; (R) Relegated

== J. League Division 2 ==
Kansai rivals Gamba Osaka and Vissel Kobe, having been both relegated from Division 1 in the previous season, contested a fierce battle for the second tier title, and Gamba was ultimately victorious. The playoffs were won by Tokushima Vortis, which overcame Kyoto Sanga at Kokuritsu to become the first Shikoku football club to compete in the top Japanese division.

FC Gifu was in bottom place for most of the season before a short burst of rejuvenation in the final weeks allowed them to climb above Gainare Tottori, who was left to face the playout against Kamatamare Sanuki, in what turned out to be their last season in the second tier.

Pos	Team	Pld	W	D	L	GF	GA	GD	Pts	Promotion or relegation
1	Gamba Osaka (C, P)	42	25	12	5	99	46	+53	87	Promotion to 2014 J.League Division 1
2	Vissel Kobe (P)	42	25	8	9	78	41	+37	83	Promotion to 2014 J.League Division 1
3	Kyoto Sanga	42	20	10	12	68	46	+22	70	Qualification for Promotion Playoffs (Note: Only teams that meet J1 criteria can participate in promotion playoffs. If one or more teams fail to meet the criteria, only eligible teams that finished 3rd to 6th participate and no replacement teams are added.)
4	Tokushima Vortis (O, P)	42	20	7	15	56	51	+5	67	Qualification for Promotion Playoffs
5	JEF United Chiba	42	18	12	12	68	49	+19	66	Qualification for Promotion Playoffs
6	V-Varen Nagasaki	42	19	9	14	48	40	+8	66	Qualification for Promotion Playoffs
7	Matsumoto Yamaga	42	19	9	14	54	54	0	66	
8	Consadole Sapporo	42	20	4	18	60	49	+11	64	
9	Tochigi SC	42	17	12	13	61	55	+6	63	
10	Montedio Yamagata	42	16	11	15	74	61	+13	59	
11	Yokohama FC	42	15	13	14	49	46	+3	58	
12	Fagiano Okayama	42	13	17	12	52	48	+4	56	
13	Tokyo Verdy	42	14	14	14	52	58	−6	56	
14	Avispa Fukuoka	42	15	11	16	47	54	−7	56	
15	Mito HollyHock	42	14	13	15	50	58	−8	55	Ineligible for promotion
16	Giravanz Kitakyushu	42	13	10	19	50	60	−10	49	Ineligible for promotion
17	Ehime FC	42	12	11	19	43	52	−9	47	
18	Kataller Toyama	42	11	11	20	45	59	−14	44	
19	Roasso Kumamoto	42	10	13	19	40	70	−30	43	
20	Thespakusatsu Gunma	42	9	13	20	43	61	−18	40	
21	FC Gifu	42	9	10	23	37	80	−43	37	Ineligible for promotion
22	Gainare Tottori (R)	42	5	16	21	38	74	−36	31	Qualification for Relegation Playoffs (Note: Promotion/relegation play-offs between J2 and JFL tooke place between Kamatamare Sanuki, 2nd-placed club of 2013 Japan Football League with J. League Associate Membership, and 22nd-ranked club of 2013 J2 season.)

Updated to match(es) played on 8 December 2013. Source: J.League Division 2
Rules for classification: 1) points; 2) goal difference; 3) number of goals scored.
(C) Champions; (O) Play-off winners; (P) Promoted; (R) Relegated

== Japan Football League ==
In spite of leading the table for most of the season, Kamatamare Sanuki slipped and was overtaken by Nagano Parceiro to the title. However, because Nagano did not fulfill the J2 stadium requirements, Sanuki was allowed to playoff against Tottori and won.

This was the last season of the JFL as the third tier of Japanese football, as a new J. League Division 3 will take its place. No club was relegated to the Regional Leagues.

Pos	Team	Pld	W	D	L	GF	GA	GD	Pts	Qualification or relegation
1	Nagano Parceiro (C)	34	21	9	4	61	25	+36	72	Formed J3 League
2	**Kamatamare Sanuki** (Note: Kamatamare Sanuki topped the table at the end of the 17th round and thus were awarded JFL seed for 2013 Emperor's Cup.) (O, P)	34	21	5	8	49	26	+23	68	Qualification for promotion playoffs (Note: Direct promotion and pro/rele series took place only if there were promotion-eligible teams (shown in bold) that claimed either of two top spots in JFL.)
3	SC Sagamihara	34	18	7	9	58	42	+16	61	Formed J3 League
4	**Machida Zelvia**	34	18	7	9	51	44	+7	61	Formed J3 League
5	Honda FC	34	14	11	9	54	38	+16	53	
6	SP Kyoto	34	14	11	9	36	25	+11	53	
7	**Zweigen Kanazawa**	34	14	8	12	60	48	+12	50	Formed J3 League
8	Blaublitz Akita	34	14	8	12	48	45	+3	50	Formed J3 League
9	Sony Sendai	34	12	14	8	33	34	−1	50	
10	Yokogawa Musashino	34	13	10	11	36	36	0	49	
11	FC Ryukyu	34	12	10	12	47	51	−4	46	Formed J3 League
12	YSCC Yokohama	34	11	6	17	45	56	−11	39	Formed J3 League
13	Fujieda MYFC	34	9	9	16	40	58	−18	36	Formed J3 League
14	Fukushima United	34	8	10	16	35	42	−7	34	Formed J3 League
15	Hoyo Oita	34	9	5	20	32	45	−13	32	
16	MIO Biwako Shiga	34	8	6	20	40	56	−16	30	
17	Tochigi Uva	34	9	3	22	34	66	−32	30	
18	Honda Lock	34	6	11	17	25	47	−22	29	

Updated to match(es) played on 8 December 2013. Source: Japan Football League
Rules for classification: 1) Points; 2) Goal differential; 3) Goals scored; 4) Head-to-head results; 5) Disciplinary points; 6) draw. If two clubs were tied for first place, both clubs would be declared champions.
(C) Champions; (O) Play-off winners; (P) Promoted

== Japanese Regional Leagues ==
Tōhoku champions Grulla Morioka won the Regional Promotion Series, and owing to meeting J. League Associate Membership requirements, they were allowed to be promoted to the new Division 3 instead of the fourth-tier JFL, which the other three finalists joined.

== Domestic cups ==
=== Japanese Super Cup ===
23 February 2013
13:35 JST

Sanfrecce Hiroshima	1–0	Kashiwa Reysol
Satō 29'	Summary

National Olympic Stadium, Tokyo
Attendance: 34,972
Referee: (Japan) Minoru Tōjō

== International club competitions ==
=== Suruga Bank Championship ===
August 7, 2013
19:00 UTC+9

Kashima Antlers (Japan)	3–2	(Brazil) São Paulo
Osako 25', 39', 90+2'	Report	Ganso 58'; Aloísio 75'

Kashima Soccer Stadium, Kashima
Attendance: 26,202
Referee: Abdul Malik Abdul Bashir (Singapore)

== National team (Men) ==
=== Results ===
International Friendly (2013 Kirin Challenge Cup)

6 February 2013	Japan	3–0	Latvia	Hyōgo, Japan
19:20 JST UTC+9	Shinji Okazaki 41', 61'; Keisuke Honda 60'			Stadium: Home's Stadium Kobe

International Friendly

22 March 2013	Japan	2–1	Canada	Doha, Qatar
19:05 UTC+3	Shinji Okazaki 10'; Mike Havenaar 74'		Marcus Haber 58'	Stadium: Khalifa International Stadium

2014 FIFA World Cup qualification (AFC) Fourth Round

26 March 2013	Jordan	2–1	Japan	Amman, Jordan
17:00 UTC+3	Khalil Bani Attiah 45+1'; Ahmad Hayel 60'		Shinji Kagawa 69'	Stadium: King Abdullah Stadium

International Friendly (2013 Asian and Japan Love)

30 May 2013	Japan	0–2	Bulgaria	Aichi, Japan
20:20 JST	Nagatomo (yellow card) 70'; Hosogai (yellow card) 84'	Summary	Manolev 3' (yellow card) 77'; Dyakov (yellow card) 56' Hasebe 70' (o.g.)	Stadium: Toyota Stadium; Attendance: 41,353; Referee: (South Korea) Kim Sang-Woo

2014 FIFA World Cup qualification (AFC) Fourth Round

4 June 2013	Japan	1–1	Australia	Saitama, Japan
20:30 JST	Hasebe (yellow card) 22'; Honda 90+1' (pen.)	Summary	Oar 82'; Bresciano (yellow card) 88'; McKay (yellow card) 90'	Stadium: Saitama Stadium 2002; Referee: (Bahrain) Nawaf Shukralla

2014 FIFA World Cup qualification (AFC) Fourth Round

11 June 2013	Iraq	0–1	Japan	Doha, Qatar
18:30 UTC+3	Alaa Abdul-Zahra (yellow card) 71' (yellow-red card); Ali Rehema (yellow card) 88'	Summary	Okazaki 89'	Stadium: Grand Hamad Stadium; Attendance: 1,100; Referee: (Uzbekistan) Valentin Kovalenko

2013 FIFA Confederations Cup

15 June 2013	Brazil	3–0	Japan	Brasília, Brazil
16:00 UTC-3	Neymar 3'; Paulinho 48'; Jô 90+3'	Summary	Hasebe (yellow card) 45+1'	Stadium: Estádio Nacional; Attendance: 67,423; Referee: (Portugal) Pedro Proença

2013 FIFA Confederations Cup

19 June 2013	Italy	4–3	Japan	Recife, Brazil
19:00 UTC-3	Buffon (yellow card) 20'; De Rossi (yellow card) 36' (goal) 41'; Uchida 50' (o.g.); Balotelli 52' (pen.); Giovinco 86'	Summary	Honda 21' (pen.); Kagawa 33'; Hasebe (yellow card) 52'; Okazaki 69'; Konno (yellow card) 90'	Stadium: Arena Pernambuco; Attendance: 40,489; Referee: (Argentina) Diego Abal

2013 FIFA Confederations Cup

22 June 2013	Japan	1–2	Mexico	Belo Horizonte, Brazil
16:00 UTC-3	Sakai (yellow card) 38'; Okazaki 86'	Summary	Hernández 54', 66'; Ochoa (yellow card) 90+5'	Stadium: Mineirão; Attendance: 52,690; Referee: (Germany) Brych

2013 EAFF East Asian Cup

21 July 2013	Japan	3–3	China	Seoul South Korea
21:00 UTC+9	Kurihara (yellow card) 3' (goal) 32'; Kakitani 59'; Kudo 60'; Makino (yellow card) 77'	Summary	Wang Yongpo 4' (pen.) 80' (pen.); Zheng Zhi (yellow card) 42'; Huang Bowen (yellow card) 67'; Du Wei (yellow card) 70'; Sun Ke 86'	Stadium: Seoul World Cup Stadium; Attendance: 3,500; Referee: (Australia) Benjamin Williams

2013 EAFF East Asian Cup

25 July 2013	Japan	3–2	Australia	Hwaseong, Gyeonggi South Korea
20:00 UTC+9	Saitō 25'; Osako 55', 79' (yellow card) 56'	Summary	Duke 75'; Juric 78'	Stadium: Hwaseong Stadium; Attendance: 1,458; Referee: (China) Hai Tan

2013 EAFF East Asian Cup

28 July 2013	South Korea	1–2	Japan	Seoul South Korea
20:00 UTC+9	Ha Dae-Sung (yellow card) 20'; Kim Young-Gwon (yellow card) 25'; Yun Il-Lok 32'; Ko Yo-Han (yellow card) 62'	Summary	Haraguchi (yellow card) 23'; Kakitani 25', 90'; Aoyama (yellow card) 76'; Kurihara (yellow card) 82'	Stadium: Olympic Stadium; Attendance: 47,258; Referee: (Australia) Benjamin Williams

Win Draw Loss

=== Players statistics ===
Player	-2012	02.06	03.22	03.26	05.30	06.04	06.11	06.15	06.19	06.22	07.21	07.25	07.28	08.14	09.06	09.10	10.11	10.15	11.16	11.19	2013	Total
Yasuhito Endo	124(10)	O	O	O	O	O	O	O	O	O	-	-	-	O	O(1)	O(1)	O	O	O	O	16(2)	140(12)
Yuichi Komano	72(1)	-	O	O	O	-	-	-	-	-	O	-	O	O	-	-	-	-	-	-	6(0)	78(1)
Kengo Nakamura	63(6)	-	O	-	O	-	O	-	O	O	-	-	-	-	-	-	-	-	-	-	5(0)	68(6)
Makoto Hasebe	63(2)	O	O	O	O	O	-	O	O	-	-	-	-	O	O	O	O	O	O	O	14(0)	77(2)
Yasuyuki Konno	63(1)	O	-	O	O	O	O	O	O	O	-	-	-	O	O	O	O	O	O	O	15(0)	78(1)
Shinji Okazaki	58(29)	O(2)	O(1)	O	-	O	O(1)	O	O(1)	O(1)	-	-	-	O	O	-	O	O	O	O(1)	14(7)	72(36)
Yuto Nagatomo	54(3)	O	-	-	O	O	O	O	O	O	-	-	-	-	O	O	O	O	O	-	12(0)	66(3)
Atsuto Uchida	52(1)	O	O	O	O	O	-	O	O	O	-	-	-	O	-	O	O	O	O	-	13(0)	65(1)
Keisuke Honda	40(12)	O(1)	-	-	-	O(1)	-	O	O(1)	O	-	-	-	O(1)	O(1)	O(1)	O	O	O(1)	O(1)	12(8)	52(20)
Eiji Kawashima	39(0)	O	O	O	O	O	O	O	O	O	-	-	-	O	-	O	O	O	-	O	14(0)	53(0)
Shinji Kagawa	37(12)	O	O	O(1)	O	O	O	O	O(1)	O	-	-	-	O(1)	O	O(1)	O	O	O	O	16(4)	53(16)
Ryoichi Maeda	24(10)	O	O	O	O	O	O	O	O	O	-	-	-	-	-	-	-	-	-	-	9(0)	33(10)
Maya Yoshida	22(2)	O	O	O	O	O	-	O	O	O	-	-	-	O	O	O	O	O	O	O	15(0)	37(2)
Hajime Hosogai	18(1)	O	-	-	O	-	O	O	-	O	-	-	-	-	-	-	O	-	-	O	7(0)	25(1)
Masahiko Inoha	16(1)	O	O	-	-	-	O	-	-	-	-	-	-	O	-	-	-	-	-	-	4(0)	20(1)
Yuzo Kurihara	13(2)	-	O	-	O	O	-	-	-	O	O(1)	O	O	-	-	-	-	-	-	-	7(1)	20(3)
Hiroshi Kiyotake	12(1)	O	-	O	O	O	O	O	-	-	-	-	-	-	O	O	O	-	O	O	11(0)	23(1)
Tomoaki Makino	11(1)	-	-	-	-	-	-	-	-	-	O	-	O	-	-	O	-	-	-	-	3(0)	14(1)
Mike Havenaar	9(3)	-	O(1)	O	O	O	O	-	O	-	-	-	-	-	-	-	O	O	-	-	8(1)	17(4)
Shusaku Nishikawa	8(0)	-	-	-	-	-	-	-	-	-	O	-	O	-	O	-	-	-	O	-	4(0)	12(0)
Hiroki Sakai	7(0)	-	O	-	O	-	O	-	O	O	-	-	-	-	-	-	-	-	O	O	7(0)	14(0)
Yuhei Tokunaga	7(0)	-	-	-	-	-	-	-	-	-	-	O	O	-	-	-	-	-	-	-	2(0)	9(0)
Takashi Inui	6(0)	O	O	O	O	-	-	O	-	-	-	-	-	-	-	-	O	-	-	-	6(0)	12(0)
Hideto Takahashi	4(0)	-	-	-	-	-	O	-	-	-	O	O	-	-	-	-	-	-	-	-	3(0)	7(0)
Gotoku Sakai	2(0)	O	O	O	-	-	-	-	-	-	-	-	-	O	O	O	-	O	O	O	9(0)	11(0)
Ryota Moriwaki	2(0)	-	-	-	-	-	-	-	-	-	-	O	-	-	-	-	-	-	-	-	1(0)	3(0)
Genki Haraguchi	1(0)	-	-	-	-	-	-	-	-	-	O	-	O	-	-	-	-	-	-	-	2(0)	3(0)
Shuichi Gonda	1(0)	-	-	-	-	-	-	-	-	-	-	O	-	-	-	-	-	-	-	-	1(0)	2(0)
Yoichiro Kakitani	0(0)	-	-	-	-	-	-	-	-	-	O(1)	-	O(2)	O	O	O	O	O	O	O(1)	9(4)	9(4)
Hotaru Yamaguchi	0(0)	-	-	-	-	-	-	-	-	-	O	O	O	O	-	O	-	O	O	O	8(0)	8(0)
Yuya Osako	0(0)	-	-	-	-	-	-	-	-	-	O	O(2)	-	-	O	O	-	-	O(1)	O	6(3)	6(3)
Masato Morishige	0(0)	-	-	-	-	-	-	-	-	-	O	-	O	-	O	O	-	O	-	O	6(0)	6(0)
Masato Kudo	0(0)	-	-	-	-	-	-	-	-	-	O(1)	O	O	-	O(1)	-	-	-	-	-	4(2)	4(2)
Manabu Saito	0(0)	-	-	-	-	-	-	-	-	-	O	O(1)	-	-	-	O	-	-	-	-	3(1)	3(1)
Toshihiro Aoyama	0(0)	-	-	-	-	-	-	-	-	-	O	-	O	-	O	-	-	-	-	-	3(0)	3(0)
Yohei Toyoda	0(0)	-	-	-	-	-	-	-	-	-	-	O	O	O	-	-	-	-	-	-	3(0)	3(0)
Yuki Otsu	0(0)	O	O	-	-	-	-	-	-	-	-	-	-	-	-	-	-	-	-	-	2(0)	2(0)
Yojiro Takahagi	0(0)	-	-	-	-	-	-	-	-	-	O	-	O	-	-	-	-	-	-	-	2(0)	2(0)
Hiroki Yamada	0(0)	-	-	-	-	-	-	-	-	-	-	O	O	-	-	-	-	-	-	-	2(0)	2(0)
Daisuke Suzuki	0(0)	-	-	-	-	-	-	-	-	-	-	O	-	-	-	-	-	-	-	-	1(0)	1(0)
Kazuhiko Chiba	0(0)	-	-	-	-	-	-	-	-	-	-	O	-	-	-	-	-	-	-	-	1(0)	1(0)
Takahiro Ogihara	0(0)	-	-	-	-	-	-	-	-	-	-	O	-	-	-	-	-	-	-	-	1(0)	1(0)

== National team (Women) ==
=== Results ===
2013.03.06	Japan	0–2	Norway	Portugal
			? (?) ? (?)

2013.03.08	Japan	1–2	Germany	Portugal
	Tanaka (?)		? (?) ? (?)

2013.03.11	Japan	2–0	Denmark	Portugal
	Kawasumi (?); Ogimi (?)

2013.03.13	Japan	1–0	China	Portugal
	Ogimi (?)

2013.06.20	Japan	1–1	New Zealand	Saga, Japan
	Ogimi (?)		? (?)	Stadium: Tosu Stadium

2013.06.26	Japan	1–1	England	England
	Kawasumi (?)		? (?)

2013.06.29	Japan	2–4	Germany	Germany
	Ono (?); Ogimi (?)		? (?) ? (?) ? (?) ? (?)

2013.07.20	Japan	2–0	China	South Korea
	Ando (?); Nakajima (?)

2013.07.25	Japan	0–0	North Korea	South Korea

2013.07.27	Japan	1–2	South Korea	South Korea
	Ogimi (?)		? (?) ? (?)

2013.09.22	Japan	2–0	Nigeria	Nagasaki, Japan
	Ogimi (?); Kawasumi (?)			Stadium: Nagasaki Stadium

2013.09.26	Japan	2–0	Nigeria	Chiba, Japan
	Miyama (?); Sakaguchi (?)			Stadium: Chiba Soga Football Stadium

=== Players statistics ===
Player	-2012	03.06	03.08	03.11	03.13	06.20	06.26	06.29	07.20	07.25	07.27	09.22	09.26	2013	Total
Homare Sawa	187(81)	-	-	-	-	O	-	-	-	-	-	O	-	2(0)	189(81)
Aya Miyama	120(29)	-	-	-	-	O	-	O	O	O	O	O	O(1)	7(1)	127(30)
Shinobu Ono	112(38)	-	-	-	-	O	O	O(1)	O	O	O	-	O	7(1)	119(39)
Kozue Ando	110(17)	-	-	-	-	O	O	O	O(1)	-	O	-	-	5(1)	115(18)
Yuki Ogimi	91(41)	O	O	O(1)	O(1)	O(1)	O	O(1)	O	O	O(1)	O(1)	O	12(6)	103(47)
Yukari Kinga	87(5)	-	-	-	-	-	-	-	-	-	-	O	-	1(0)	88(5)
Azusa Iwashimizu	85(8)	O	O	O	-	O	O	O	O	O	O	-	O	10(0)	95(8)
Karina Maruyama	73(14)	-	-	-	-	O	O	O	-	-	-	O	-	4(0)	77(14)
Miho Fukumoto	67(0)	-	-	-	-	O	-	O	O	-	-	-	-	3(0)	70(0)
Mizuho Sakaguchi	61(17)	-	-	-	-	O	O	O	O	O	O	-	O(1)	7(1)	68(18)
Rumi Utsugi	54(5)	-	O	O	O	O	O	O	O	O	-	-	-	8(0)	62(5)
Aya Sameshima	52(2)	O	O	O	-	-	-	-	-	-	-	-	-	3(0)	55(2)
Saki Kumagai	49(0)	-	O	O	O	O	O	O	O	O	O	-	-	9(0)	58(0)
Nahomi Kawasumi	39(9)	O	O	O(1)	-	O	O(1)	O	O	O	O	O(1)	O	11(3)	50(12)
Ayumi Kaihori	34(0)	-	O	-	-	O	O	-	-	O	O	O	-	6(0)	40(0)
Megumi Takase	29(5)	O	O	O	O	-	-	-	-	O	-	O	-	6(0)	35(5)
Asuna Tanaka	19(3)	O	O	O	O	O	O	O	O	-	O	-	-	9(0)	28(3)
Megumi Kamionobe	18(2)	-	-	-	-	-	O	O	-	O	O	O	-	5(0)	23(2)
Mana Iwabuchi	15(2)	-	-	-	-	-	O	O	O	O	O	-	-	5(0)	20(2)
Manami Nakano	11(2)	-	-	-	-	-	-	-	-	-	-	O	-	1(0)	12(2)
Yuika Sugasawa	10(2)	-	-	-	-	-	-	-	-	-	O	-	O	2(0)	12(2)
Saori Ariyoshi	5(0)	O	O	-	O	O	O	O	O	-	-	-	O	8(0)	13(0)
Nanase Kiryu	5(0)	-	-	-	-	-	-	-	-	-	-	-	O	1(0)	6(0)
Kana Osafune	4(0)	O	-	-	O	-	O	-	-	-	-	-	O	4(0)	8(0)
Asano Nagasato	4(0)	O	-	O	-	-	-	-	-	-	-	-	-	2(0)	6(0)
Michi Goto	2(2)	-	-	-	-	-	-	-	-	-	-	-	O	1(0)	3(2)
Emi Nakajima	2(0)	-	-	O	O	-	O	-	O(1)	O	O	O	-	7(1)	9(1)
Yuri Kawamura	2(0)	O	-	-	-	-	-	-	-	-	-	-	O	2(0)	4(0)
Erina Yamane	1(0)	-	-	O	O	-	-	-	-	-	-	-	O	3(0)	4(0)
Ami Otaki	1(0)	O	-	-	O	-	-	-	-	-	-	-	-	2(0)	3(0)
Mina Tanaka	0(0)	-	O(1)	O	O	-	-	-	-	-	-	-	O	4(1)	4(1)
Yoko Tanaka	0(0)	O	O	-	O	-	-	-	-	-	-	O	-	4(0)	4(0)
Marumi Yamazaki	0(0)	O	-	O	O	-	-	-	-	O	-	-	-	4(0)	4(0)
Yuka Kado	0(0)	O	-	O	O	-	-	-	-	-	-	-	-	3(0)	3(0)
Shiho Ogawa	0(0)	O	-	O	O	-	-	-	-	-	-	-	-	3(0)	3(0)
Mari Kawamura	0(0)	O	-	-	O	-	-	-	-	-	-	-	-	2(0)	2(0)
Fubuki Kuno	0(0)	O	-	-	-	-	-	-	-	-	-	-	-	1(0)	1(0)
Kana Kitahara	0(0)	-	-	-	-	-	-	-	-	-	-	O	-	1(0)	1(0)
Shiori Miyake	0(0)	-	-	-	-	-	-	-	-	-	-	O	-	1(0)	1(0)
Saori Arimachi	0(0)	-	-	-	-	-	-	-	-	-	-	O	-	1(0)	1(0)
Ryoko Takara	0(0)	-	-	-	-	-	-	-	-	-	-	O	-	1(0)	1(0)
Saki Ueno	0(0)	-	-	-	-	-	-	-	-	-	-	-	O	1(0)	1(0)
Rie Azami	0(0)	-	-	-	-	-	-	-	-	-	-	-	O	1(0)	1(0)
Hikari Nakade	0(0)	-	-	-	-	-	-	-	-	-	-	-	O	1(0)	1(0)
