= 2022 All Japan Women's University Football Championship =

Tournament details
- Country: Japan
- Dates: 24 December 2022 – 6 January 2023
- Teams: 24

Final positions
- Champions: Toyo (1st title)
- Runners-up: Yamanashi Gakuin

The 2022 All Japan Women's University Football Championship (第31回全日本大学女子サッカー選手権大会; All Japan 31st University Football Championship) marked the 31st edition of the referred annually contested women's cup for universities across Japan, which started on 24 December 2022 and ended on 6 January 2023. The tournament was contested by 24 universities on a knockout-stage format, organized by the Japan Women's University Football Federation alongside the Japan Football Association.

Waseda were the current champions, lifting their seventh trophy on 2021, after a 1–0 triumph past Shizuoka Sangyo. This 2022 season, Toyo managed to win their first trophy, winning by 1–0 past Yamanashi Gakuin in the final. All the matches were streamed on the All Japan Women's University Football Association Official YouTube Channel.

== Calendar ==
The schedule was decided on 22 November 2022.

Round	Date	Matches	Clubs
First round	24 December 2022	16	16 → 8
Round of 16	26 December 2022	8	16 (8+8) → 8
Quarter-finals	28 December 2022	4	8 → 4
Semi-finals	4 January 2023	2	4 → 2
Final	6 January 2023	1	2 → 1

== Venues ==
All the matches were played in two areas, on the Hyogo Prefecture and the Tokyo Metropolis. The two stadiums which hosted all the matches from the first round down to the quarter-finals utilized two grounds, or fields, at the same place, to enable more matches to be simultaneously held. The venues and the city in which they are located in are as follows:

- Miki
  - Miki Athletic Stadium (No. 1 and No.2) – Host matches from the 1st Round to the quarter-finals
  - Mikibo Football Ground (No.1 and No.2) – Host matches from the 1st Round to the quarter-finals
- Tokyo
  - Ajinomoto Field Nishigaoka – Host the Semi-final and the Final

== Participating clubs ==
In parentheses: Each university's performance at the regional qualifying series.

Region	University (Regional placement)	Located on
2021 champions (Kanto)	Waseda University (4th)	Tokyo
Hokkaido	Sapporo University (1st)	Sapporo
Tohoku	Sendai University (1st)	Miyagi
Tohoku	Hachinohe Gakuin University (2nd)	Aomori
Kanto	Toyo University (1st)	Gunma
Kanto	Teikyo Heisei University (2nd)	Tokyo
Kanto	Yamanashi Gakuin University (3rd)	Yamanashi
Kanto	Kanagawa University (5th)	Kanagawa
Kanto	Nippon Sport Science University (6th)	Tokyo
Kanto	Tokyo International University (7th)	Saitama
Kanto	Nihon University (8th)	Tokyo
Hokushin'etsu	Niigata University of Health and Welfare (1st)	Niigata
Hokushin'etsu	Shinshu University (2nd)	Nagano
Tokai	Shizuoka Sangyo University (1st)	Shizuoka
Tokai	Aichi Toho University (2nd)	Aichi
Kansai	Osaka University of Health and Sport Sciences (1st)	Osaka
Kansai	Meiji University of Integrative Medicine (2nd)	Kyoto
Kansai	Otemon Gakuin University (3rd)	Osaka
Kansai	Tezukayama Gakuin University (4th)	Osaka
Chugoku	Kibi International University (1st)	Okayama
Chugoku	Shunan University (2nd)	Yamaguchi
Shikoku	Shikoku University (1st)	Tokushima
Kyushu	Fukuoka University (1st)	Fukuoka
Kyushu	Kwassui University (2nd)	Nagasaki

== Schedule ==
=== First round ===
24 December 2022 Match 1	Aichi Toho	0–1	Otemon Gakuin	Hyogo
11:00		Report		Stadium: Mikibo Football Ground No.1

24 December 2022 Match 2	Nippon SS	3–0	Niigata HW	Hyogo
13:40		Report		Stadium: Mikibo Football Ground No.1

24 December 2022 Match 3	Meiji IM	4–0	Sapporo	Hyogo
11:00		Report		Stadium: Mikibo Football Ground No.2

24 December 2022 Match 4	Kibi International	3–1	Fukuoka	Hyogo
13:40		Report		Stadium: Mikibo Football Ground No.2

24 December 2022 Match 5	Tokyo International	6–1	Kwassui	Miki
11:00		Report		Stadium: Miki Athletic Stadium No.1

24 December 2022 Match 6	Shikoku	11–0	Shinshu	Miki
13:40		Report		Stadium: Miki Athletic Stadium No.1

24 December 2022 Match 7	Tezukayama Gakuin	2–2 (a.e.t.) (4–5 p)	Shunan	Miki
11:00		Report		Stadium: Miki Athletic Stadium No.2

24 December 2022 Match 8	Nihon	9–0	Hachinohe	Miki
13:40		Report		Stadium: Miki Athletic Stadium No.2

=== Round of 16 ===
26 December 2022 Match 9	Toyo	3–0	Otemon Gakuin	Miki
11:00		Report		Stadium: Miki Athletic Stadium No.1

26 December 2022 Match 10	Nippon SS	2–1	Sendai	Miki
13:40		Report		Stadium: Miki Athletic Stadium No.1

26 December 2022 Match 11	Kanagawa	3–0	Meiji IM	Miki
11:00		Report		Stadium: Miki Athletic Stadium No.2

26 December 2022 Match 12	Kibi International	1–1 (4–3 p)	Teikyo Heisei	Miki
13:40		Report		Stadium: Miki Athletic Stadium No.2

26 December 2022 Match 13	Yamanashi Gakuin	1–0	Tokyo International	Hyogo
11:00		Report		Stadium: Mikibo Football Ground No.1

26 December 2022 Match 14	Shikoku	0–2	Osaka HSS	Hyogo
13:40		Report		Stadium: Mikibo Football Ground No.1

26 December 2022 Match 15	Waseda	2–0	Shunan	Hyogo
11:00		Report		Stadium: Mikibo Football Ground No.2

26 December 2022 Match 16	Nihon	1–0	Shizuoka Sangyo	Hyogo
13:40		Report		Stadium: Mikibo Football Ground No.2

=== Quarter-finals ===
28 December 2022 Match 17	Toyo	0–0 (5–4 p)	Nippon SS	Hyogo
11:00		Report		Stadium: Mikibo Football Ground No.1

28 December 2022 Match 18	Kanagawa	2–5	Kibi International	Hyogo
13:40		Report		Stadium: Mikibo Football Ground No.1

28 December 2022 Match 19	Yamanashi Gakuin	3–0	Osaka HSS	Hyogo
11:00		Report		Stadium: Mikibo Football Ground No.2

28 December 2022 Match 20	Waseda	1–1 (2–3 p)	Nihon	Hyogo
13:40		Report		Stadium: Mikibo Football Ground No.2

=== Semi-finals ===
4 January 2023 Match 21	Toyo	5–0	Kibi International	Tokyo
11:00		Report		Stadium: Ajinomoto Field Nishigaoka

4 January 2023 Match 22	Yamanashi Gakuin	3–1	Nihon	Tokyo
14:00		Report		Stadium: Ajinomoto Field Nishigaoka

=== Final ===
6 January 2023 Match 23	Toyo	1–0	Yamanashi Gakuin	Tokyo
13:00	Eri Kitagawa 66'	Report		Stadium: Ajinomoto Field Nishigaoka; Attendance: 675; Referee: Minako Ito
