= College soccer =

Form of soccer

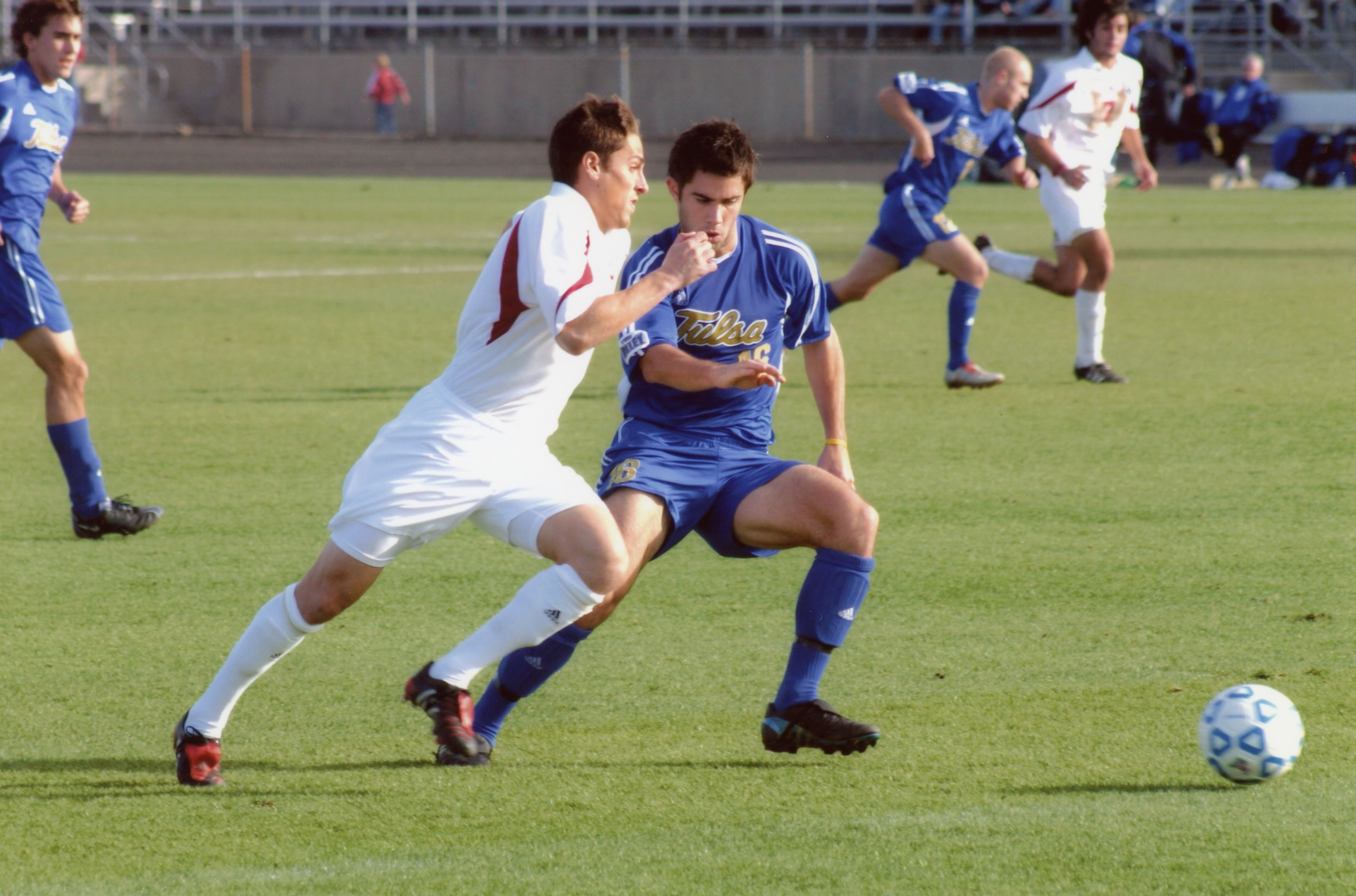
- An NCAA Division I game between Indiana and Tulsa in 2004
- Governing body: List: NCAA; NAIA; NCCAA; NJCAA; USCAA; CCCAA; ACCA; AIAW (defunct)
- First played: 1959 (NCAA, NAIA) (Note: Although the first official soccer season was held in 1959, the first de facto college football game held in 1869 between Ruters and Princeton Universities (with rules based on The Football Association) is considered the first "not official" collegiate soccer match and the birth of the sport in the United States.)

Club competitions
- Men's: Division I, Division II, Division III (NCAA); Championship (NAIA); Women's: Division I, Division II, Division III (NCAA); Championship (NAIA)

Audience records
- Single match: 22,512 (St. Louis 5–1 SIUE at Busch Stadium, 30 Oct 1980)

College soccer, called university soccer or college football in some countries, is played by teams composed of soccer players who are enrolled in colleges and universities. While it is most widespread in the United States, it is also prominent in Japan, South Korea, Canada, South Africa, and the Philippines. The United Kingdom also has a university league. Institutions typically employ professional coaches and staff, while the players are students representing their schools. In the United States, college soccer is sponsored primarily by the National Collegiate Athletic Association (NCAA) and the National Association of Intercollegiate Athletics (NAIA). The NCAA organizes men's and women's soccer competition across Division I, Division II, and Division III, while the National Association of Intercollegiate Athletics organizes men's and women's soccer within a single competitive division and conducts separate national championships for each. Both organizations oversee intercollegiate competition among their member colleges and universities.

In the United States, college soccer teams play a variety of conference and non-conference games throughout the fall season culminating in the post-season tournament known as the College Cup. The St. Louis University Billikens is the most successful men's team, having won 10 College Cups. The North Carolina Tar Heels led by head coach Anson Dorrance is the most successful women's college soccer team with 21 College Cup wins.

Each year, the best American men's and women's college soccer player is awarded the Hermann Trophy.

After their collegiate careers, top men's players often play professionally in Major League Soccer or other professional leagues around the world like the Premier League in England, the Bundesliga in Germany, Ligue 1 in France, Liga MX in Mexico, Serie A in Italy, Scottish Premiership in Scotland. Top women's players may play professionally in the National Women's Soccer League or other professional soccer leagues around the world including the Women's Super League in England, Division 1 Féminine in France, Damallsvenskan in Sweden, Germany's Frauen-Bundesliga, Australia's A-League Women, or Japan's WE League.

== United States ==
=== History ===
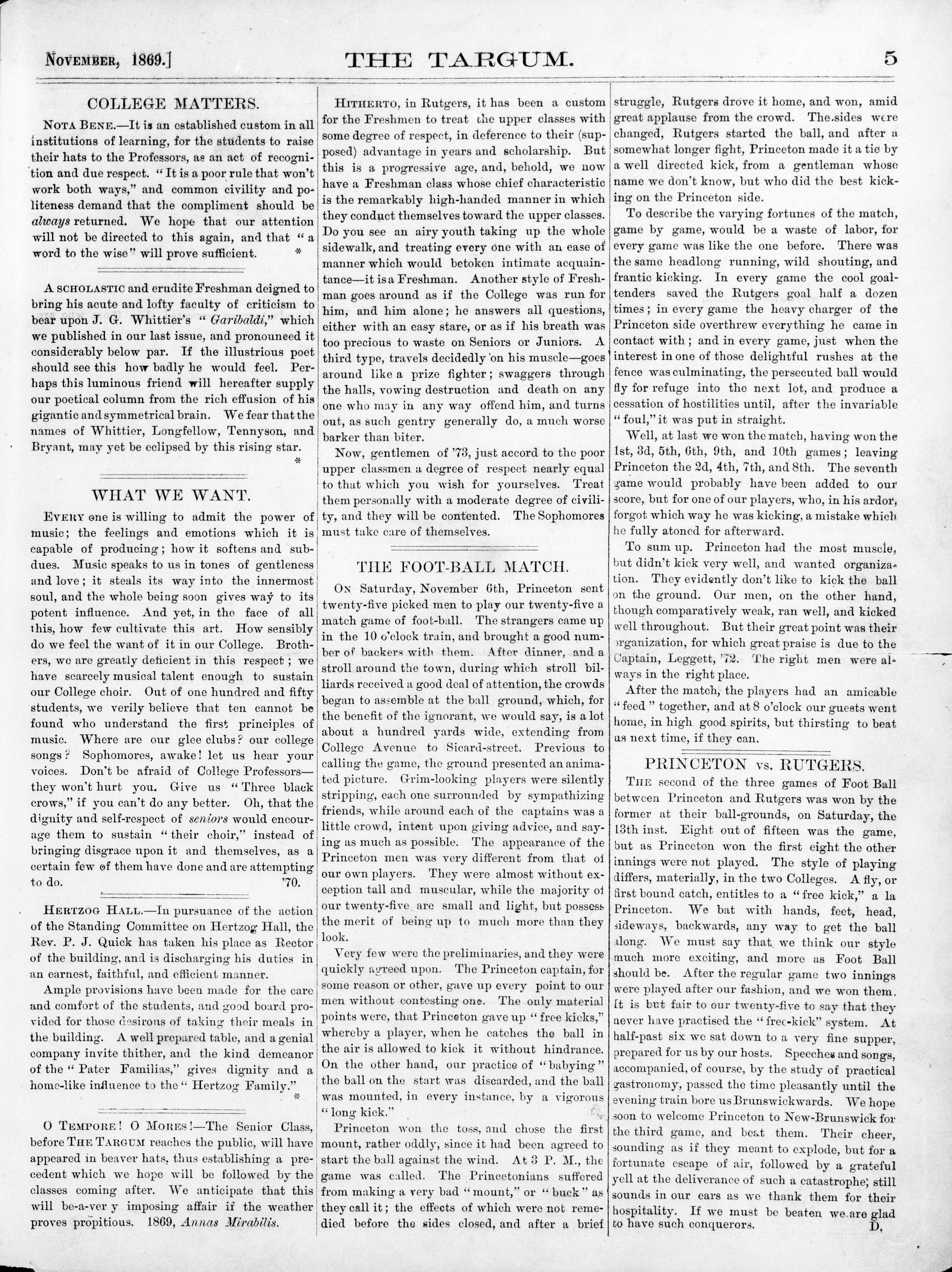
"The Foot-Ball Match", Chronicle of the Rutgers v Princeton game on The Targum, Nov 1869

The first de facto college football game held in the U.S. in 1869 between Rutgers and Princeton Universities was contested at Rutgers captain John W. Leggett's request, with rules mixing soccer and rugby and loosely based on those of the Football Association in London, England. As a result, it is considered the first collegiate soccer match and the birth of soccer in the United States.

However other sports historians argue that this was actually the first-ever college gridiron football season in history. But that perception is changing, with Harvard being recognized as a pioneer in gridiron football, along with McGill, Tufts, and Yale.

The NCAA first began holding a men's national soccer championship in 1959. Before 1959, the men's national champion had been determined by a national poll instead of through a national tournament. Saint Louis University won the 1959 inaugural championship using mostly local players, defeating teams composed mostly of foreign players. Saint Louis continued to dominate the Division I championship for some years, appearing in five consecutive finals from 1959 to 1963 and winning four; and appearing in six consecutive finals from 1969 to 1974 and winning four.

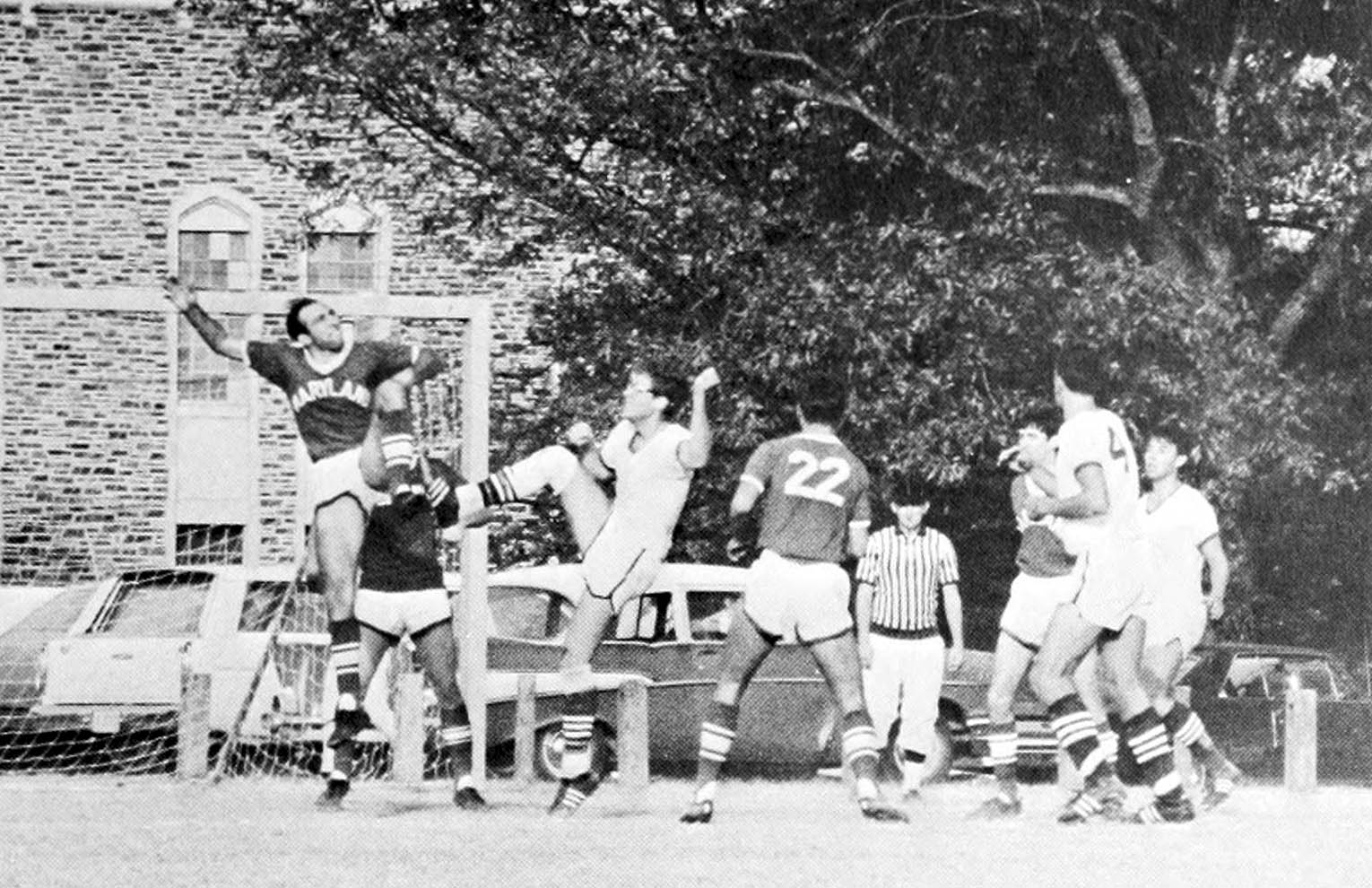
Duke (in white) v Maryland game in 1968

College soccer continued growing throughout the 1970s, with the NCAA adding a men's Division III in 1974 to accommodate the growing number of schools. Indiana University's men's soccer program achieved success in the 1980s, 1990s, and 2000s with 8 national championships, 6 Hermann Trophy winners (national player of the year), and 13 national team players. From 1973 to 2003 no team won more men's national championships or had more NCAA College Cup appearances than Indiana. Virginia won a record four consecutive men's national championships from 1991 to 1994 under head coach Bruce Arena.

The first college women's varsity soccer team was established at Castleton State College, now known as Castleton University, in Vermont in the mid-1960s. A major factor in the growth of women's college soccer was the passage of the Education Amendments of 1972, which included Title IX that mandated equal access and equal spending on athletic programs at college institutions. As a result, college varsity soccer programs for women were established. Since at least 1977, African American and women coaches have been underrepresented and have a significantly shorter tenure.

By 1981, about 100 varsity programs had been established in NCAA women's soccer, and even more club teams had been established. The AIAW (Association for Intercollegiate Athletics for Women), was established in the mid-1970s and began sponsoring women's varsity programs. It established an informal national championship in 1980, which Cortland State won. A year later in 1981, the University of North Carolina hosted and won the tournament.

In 1982, the NCAA began to sponsor women's sports and all schools switched to the NCAA. One major difference in the growth of women's college soccer unlike men's college soccer, was that it did not start primarily in one region of the country and spread through the decades. With help from men's soccer, the women's program was able to take root all over the country at once and grow from there. The University of North Carolina, coached by Anson Dorrance, immediately stood out as the ones to beat in the women's college game and remain that way up to today. Of the first 20 NCAA championships, 16 were won by UNC, including nine in a row from 1986 to 1994.

=== Competition format ===
College soccer is played in the fall from August to December depending on if a team makes the tournament and how long they are in the tournament. Teams play conference and non-conference teams. The NCAA tournament is played in November to early December with the Final Four and Championship game played in December. There are 48 teams in the men's tournament and 64 teams in the women's tournament.

==== Proposed Division I men's season change ====
After many months of extended unofficial discussion, on August 22, 2016, NCAA Division I men's coaches and the National Soccer Coaches Association of America (NSCAA) officially began an "informational campaign" to build support for a proposed change of the playing schedule for Division I men's soccer. Under the proposed changes of the "Academic Year Season Model", the number of games on the Fall schedule and the number of mid-week games would be reduced, with games added in the Spring following a Winter break, and the NCAA Division I men's soccer tournament would be moved from November and December to May and June. In addition to more closely matching the professional season, the changes address player health and safety issues and the time demands on student-athletes. The proposal concerns only Division I men's soccer. While a large majority of men's coaches and players support the changes, only a small minority of women's coaches and players currently do so. At this time, there is only the "informational campaign" "...to educate our Athletic Directors, NCAA leadership, student-athletes, coaches and fans on the advantages of this Academic Year Model," said Sasho Cirovski, NSCAA D1 Men's committee chair and University of Maryland head coach.

A formal proposal was made and a vote was scheduled to take place in April, 2020, but was postponed due to the COVID-19 pandemic. During the 2020-2021 NCAA Tournament, rescheduled to the spring of 2021, broadcasters mentioned that the vote will take place in the spring of 2022.

=== Rules ===
While similar in general appearance, NCAA rules diverge significantly from FIFA Laws of the Game. A manager may make limited substitutions, and each player is allowed one re-entry which must occur in the second half of the match unless the substitution was caused by a player injury resulting from a caution or send-off. Since 2024, all playoff matches have an overtime period if the game remains tied after 90 minutes, but not the regular season. It consists of a regular two-half extra-time period, with the golden goal. During playoff games, if the tie persists after two ten-minute periods, it would go to a penalty shootout. College soccer is played with a clock that can be stopped when signaled to by the referee for injuries, the issuing of cards, or when the referee believes a team is wasting time. The clock is also stopped after goals until play is restarted, and the clock generally counts down from 45:00 to 0:00 in each half. In most professional soccer leagues, there is an up-counting clock with the referee adding stoppage time to the end of each 45-minute half.

==== Double-jeopardy rule change ====
In February 2017, the NCAA rules committee met to discuss a proposed rule that would change the double jeopardy rule. If the last player was to foul a player and deny a goal-scoring opportunity, this rule would instead give the referee the ability to choose to issue a yellow card, if they were to feel it was a proper attempt to get the ball. The change was approved.

==== Potential timekeeping change ====
On March 29, 2018, the NCAA announced that its rules committee had recommended that the organization align itself with FIFA timekeeping rules, with the new rule slated for adoption in the 2018 season. If this proposal had been adopted,

- Stadium clocks would count upward, and the displayed time would be based on the elapsed time of the game.
- The official time would be kept on-field by the referee.
- When the stadium clock indicated one minute remaining in a half or overtime period, the referee would signal the amount of stoppage time to the sideline, and a sign indicating the number of minutes of stoppage time would be displayed.

The committee felt that the then-current timekeeping system led to gamesmanship, specifically blatant delaying tactics, at the end of matches.

==== Potential season change ====
On January 15, 2020, a change for the men's D1 season to run across the full academic year with fall and spring play was proposed. The main motivations for the proposal were to reduce injury and improve the balance academic and other college experiences for athletes. In the fall during the regular season, teams may play 18 to 20 games over 10 weeks—an average of one match every 3.6 days—resulting in higher rates of injury compared to players who recovered for 6 or more days. Under the new schedule, there would be only one match per week.

When initially proposed, the changes were supported by the Atlantic Coast Conference, the Big Ten Conference, and the Pac-12 Conference. The proposal was to be voted on in April 2020 but was indefinitely tabled due to NCAA D1 Legislative Committees prioritizing issues related to the COVID-19 pandemic. During the 2020-2021 NCAA Tournament, broadcasters mentioned that the vote is scheduled for the spring of 2022.

=== Attendance leaders ===
==== Men's ====
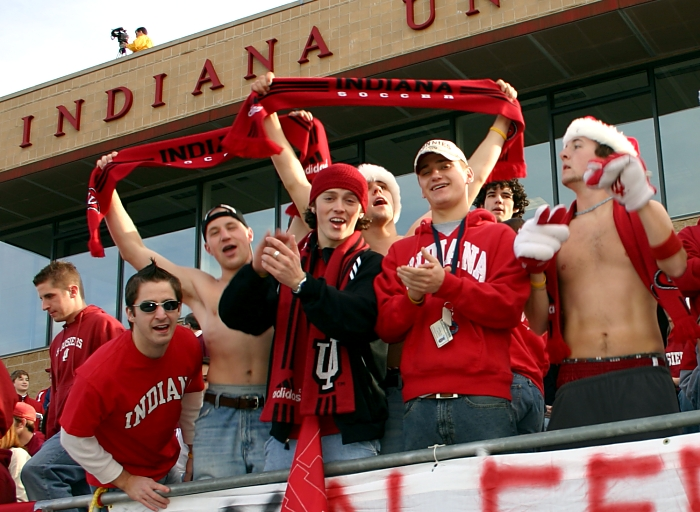
Fans at college soccer games (here at Indiana University in 2004) can number in the thousands between top teams

Annual home attendance champions by average attendance
Year	School	Conference	Home games	Average attendance
1998	Fresno State Bulldogs	WAC	10	2,716
1999	Saint Louis Billikens	C-USA	11	3,037
2000	Connecticut Huskies (Note: Athletically branded as "UConn" since 2013.)	Big East	14	2,772
2001	Saint Louis Billikens	C-USA	12	2,767
2002	Connecticut Huskies	Big East	11	2,519
2003	Saint Louis Billikens	C-USA	9	2,779
2004	Indiana Hoosiers	Big Ten	11	2,385
2005	New Mexico Lobos	MPSF	10	3,629
2006	Connecticut Huskies	Big East	11	2,931
2007	UC Santa Barbara Gauchos	Big West	11	3,435
2008	UC Santa Barbara Gauchos	Big West	11	3,444
2009	UC Santa Barbara Gauchos	Big West	12	4,335
2010	UC Santa Barbara Gauchos	Big West	12	5,873
2011	UC Santa Barbara Gauchos	Big West	13	4,782
2012	UC Santa Barbara Gauchos	Big West	9	5,542
2013	UC Santa Barbara Gauchos	Big West	13	3,707
2014	UC Santa Barbara Gauchos	Big West	11	3,844
2015	UC Santa Barbara Gauchos	Big West	12	3,844
2016	Maryland Terrapins	Big Ten	13	4,014
2017	UConn Huskies	American	12	3,502
2018	UConn Huskies	American	12	3,213
2019	Maryland Terrapins	Big Ten	13	2,311
2021	Saint Louis Billikens	A10	13	3,061
2022	South Carolina Gamecocks	Sun Belt (Note: South Carolina's primary conference is the SEC, but their men's soccer program competes in the Sun Belt Conference.)	9	2,839
2023	South Carolina Gamecocks	Sun Belt	10	4,306

==== Women's ====
Annual home attendance champions by average attendance
Year	School	Conference	Home games	Average attendance
1998	North Carolina Tar Heels	ACC	8	3,046
1999	North Carolina Tar Heels	ACC	12	3,196
2000	North Carolina Tar Heels	ACC	9	3,148
2001	North Carolina Tar Heels	ACC	10	3,983
2002	North Carolina Tar Heels	ACC	9	2,048
2003	Texas A&M Aggies	Big 12	12	1,977
2004	Texas A&M Aggies	Big 12	14	2,790
2005	Portland Pilots	WCC	12	3,403
2006	Portland Pilots	WCC	9	3,408
2007	Portland Pilots	WCC	10	3,771
2008	Portland Pilots	WCC	13	3,622
2009	Portland Pilots	WCC	13	3,472
2010	Portland Pilots	WCC	13	3,549
2011	Portland Pilots	WCC	10	3,110
2012	Portland Pilots	WCC	13	3,313
2013	Portland Pilots	WCC	12	2,937
2014	Portland Pilots	WCC	8	2,971
2015	BYU Cougars	WCC	11	3,496
2016	BYU Cougars	WCC	10	2,957
2017	BYU Cougars	WCC	11	3,006
2018	Texas A&M Aggies	SEC	13	2,562
2019	BYU Cougars	WCC	12	2,945
2021	BYU Cougars	WCC	13	2,513
2022	BYU Cougars	WCC	11	3,186
2023	South Carolina Gamecocks	SEC	11	4,150
2024	South Carolina Gamecocks	SEC	10	4,204

=== College Cup ===
==== Men's ====
The following teams have won the College Cup two or more times.

Team	Number	Years won
Saint Louis	10	1959, 1960, 1962, 1963, 1965, 1967 †, 1969, 1970, 1972, 1973
Indiana	8	1982, 1983, 1988, 1998, 1999, 2003, 2004, 2012
Virginia	7	1989 †, 1991, 1992, 1993, 1994, 2009, 2014
Clemson	4	1984, 1987, 2021, 2023
Maryland	4	1968 ‡, 2005, 2008, 2018
San Francisco	4	1966, 1975, 1976, 1980
UCLA	4	1985, 1990, 1997, 2002
Stanford	3	2015, 2016, 2017
UConn	2	1981, 2000
Michigan State	2	1967 †, 1968 ‡
North Carolina	2	2001, 2011

Side Notes:

- † Co-champions—Game called due to weather
- ‡ Co-champions—Game was declared a tie

==== Women's ====
The following teams have won the College Cup.

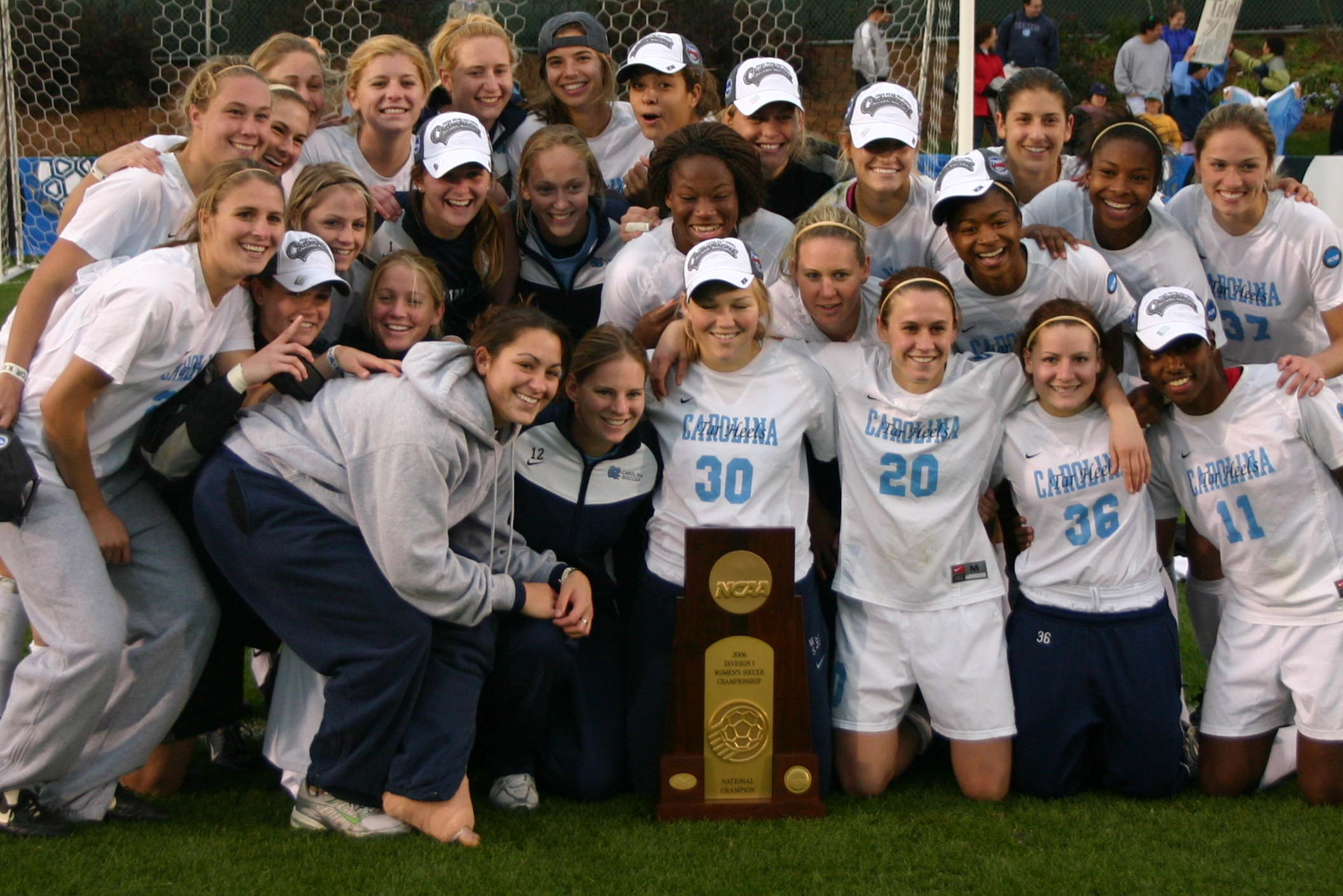
North Carolina Tar Heels celebrate winning the 2006 Women's College Cup

Team	Number	Years won
North Carolina	22	1982, 1983, 1984, 1986, 1987, 1988, 1989, 1990, 1991, 1992, 1993, 1994, 1996, 1997, 1999, 2000, 2003, 2006, 2008, 2009, 2012, 2024
Florida State	5	2014, 2018, 2021, 2023, 2025
Notre Dame	3	1995, 2004, 2010
Stanford	3	2011, 2017, 2019
Portland	2	2002, 2005
USC	2	2007, 2016
Santa Clara	2	2001, 2020
UCLA	2	2013, 2022
George Mason	1	1985
Florida	1	1998
Penn State	1	2015

=== Players ===
Several American college soccer programs have developed players who have gone on to play professionally or for the U.S. national teams. Every year since its inception in 1996, Major League Soccer (MLS) has held a SuperDraft in which MLS teams draft young prospects. The draft picks in the MLS SuperDraft are often U.S.-based college soccer players. A similar format is held each year for the National Women's Soccer League (NWSL): the NWSL College Draft.

The Hermann Trophy is awarded annually by the Missouri Athletic Club to the top male and female college soccer players in the United States. At the start of the college soccer season, a list of Hermann Trophy nominees is compiled. Near the end of the college regular season, 15 players are announced as semifinalists. In early December the top three vote-getters for both the men's and women's trophies are announced as finalists. In an annual banquet held at the Missouri Athletic Club of St. Louis, the winners of the two awards are announced. Hermann Trophy winners who have starred for the U.S. national teams at multiple FIFA World Cups include Tony Meola (1989), Alexi Lalas (1991), and Claudio Reyna (1993), Michelle Akers (1988), Shannon Higgins (1989), Kristine Lilly (1991), Mia Hamm (1991–92), Tisha Venturini (1994), Shannon MacMillan (1995), Cindy Parlow (1997–98), Aly Wagner (2002), Kelley O'Hara (2009), Christen Press (2010), Crystal Dunn (2012) and Morgan Brian (2013–14).

Many top American men's college soccer players play for separate teams in the Premier Development League (PDL) during the summer. One college club, the BYU Cougars men's team, has foregone playing in the NCAA or NAIA and instead play all of their games in the PDL.

Several coaches who have won the College Cup have gone on to coach Division I professional soccer or even the U.S. national teams. The most well-known NCAA men's team coaches who have gone on to success in the professional ranks include Bruce Arena (four College Cups with Virginia from 1991 to 1994), and Sigi Schmid (won two College Cups with UCLA in 1985 and 1990). On the women's side, North Carolina coach Anson Dorrance coached the United States women's national soccer team during its early years from 1986 to 1994 and led the team to win the inaugural 1991 FIFA Women's World Cup in China. Former UCLA Bruins coach Jill Ellis led the national team to win its third World Cup at the 2015 FIFA Women's World Cup in Canada.

Many women's college soccer players take opportunities to play professionally in the National Women's Soccer League (NWSL) and in Europe, Asia, and Australia. Players are also chosen from college to be members of the United States women's national soccer team. The NWSL started in 2012 and now consists of 12 teams, with two more to be added in 2024. However, the league's player draft is not restricted to college players, and the first player selected in the most recent draft in 2023, Alyssa Thompson, turned down a scholarship offer from Stanford to enter the draft.

Recent winners of the Mac Hermann Trophy include international players such as Kadeisha Buchanan (2016), Raquel Rodríguez (2015), Morgan Brian (2014, 2013), and Crystal Dunn (2012).

=== Foreign players ===
Recently, more and more foreign players have been introduced to American college soccer. Getting recruited from overseas, these foreign players are joining teams of many college teams. 2015 was the first year that there was a flood of international players joining these teams. These players are said to join college soccer in hopes of playing professionally in Major League Soccer and also to get the education that the United States provides, with uncertainties raised about the playing time and type of education they would receive in their countries.

=== College soccer ===
College soccer in the United States is sponsored by the National Collegiate Athletic Association (NCAA), the sports regulatory body for major universities, and by the governing bodies for smaller universities and colleges. This sport is played on a rectangular field of the dimensions of about 70–75 yards sideline to sideline (width), and 115–120 yards goal line to goal line (length).

College soccer teams play a variety of conference and non-conference games throughout the fall season, with the season culminating in the post-season tournament called the College Cup. The Saint Louis Billikens are the most successful men's team, having won 10 College Cups while the North Carolina Tar Heels led by head coach Anson Dorrance is the most successful women's college soccer team with 21 College Cup wins.

The best men's and women's college soccer player each year is awarded the Hermann Trophy.

=== Divisions and conferences ===
There are approximately 800 NCAA men's soccer programs—206 NCAA Division I, 207 Division II, and 408 Division III. There are 959 NCAA women's soccer teams—310 Division I, 225 Division II, and 424 Division III.

The number of men's Division I programs has stayed roughly constant since the mid-1990s, but the number of women's Division I programs has increased from 190 in 1995–96 to 310 in 2008–09.

==== NCAA Division I ====
Among Division I all-sports conferences that sponsor a complete array of sports, only the Mid-Eastern Athletic Conference does not sponsor soccer at all. The Pac-12 Conference resumed full operation in 2026–27, having added seven new members in 2026 following the departure of 10 members for other conferences in 2024. All of the 2026–27 members sponsor women's soccer, but only three sponsor the men's sport. To that end, the Pac-12 entered into a men's soccer alliance with the Big West Conference that saw four full Big West members become Pac-12 men's soccer affiliates. The Mountain West Conference added men's soccer in the 2026 season. All of the remaining 30 conferences sponsor women's soccer, but eight of these do not sponsor men's soccer, most notably two power conferences, the Big 12 and SEC.

Statuses of men's soccer for each conference reflect alignments for the 2026 season.

- America East Conference
- American Conference
- Atlantic Coast Conference
- Atlantic Sun Conference
- Atlantic 10 Conference
- Big East Conference
- Big Sky Conference (Note: (Women only.))
- Big South Conference
- Big Ten Conference
- Big 12 Conference
- Big West Conference
- Coastal Athletic Association
- Conference USA
- Horizon League
- Ivy League
- Metro Conference
- Mid-American Conference
- Missouri Valley Conference
- Mountain West Conference
- NEC
- Ohio Valley Conference
- Pac-12 Conference
- Patriot League
- Southeastern Conference
- Southern Conference
- Southland Conference
- Southwestern Athletic Conference
- The Summit League
- Sun Belt Conference
- United Athletic Conference
- West Coast Conference
- Independents (none for men, 1 for women)

==== NCAA Division II ====
Of the 23 Division II all-sports conferences, only the Central Intercollegiate Athletic Association and the Southern Intercollegiate Athletic Conference do not sponsor soccer at all. All of the remaining conferences sponsor soccer for both sexes except the Northern Sun Intercollegiate Conference, which sponsors the sport for women only.

- California Collegiate Athletic Association
- Central Atlantic Collegiate Conference
- Conference Carolinas
- East Coast Conference
- Great American Conference
- Great Lakes Intercollegiate Athletic Conference
- Great Lakes Valley Conference
- Great Midwest Athletic Conference
- Great Northwest Athletic Conference
- Gulf South Conference
- Lone Star Conference
- Mid-America Intercollegiate Athletics Association
- Mountain East Conference
- Northeast-10 Conference
- Northern Sun Intercollegiate Conference (Note: Women only.)
- Pacific West Conference
- Peach Belt Conference
- Pennsylvania State Athletic Conference
- Rocky Mountain Athletic Conference
- South Atlantic Conference
- Sunshine State Conference
- NCAA Division II independent schools

==== NCAA Division III ====
All Division III all-sports conferences sponsor soccer for both sexes. The Wisconsin Intercollegiate Athletic Conference dropped men's soccer after the 2014 season but reinstated it in 2024.

- Allegheny Mountain Collegiate Conference
- American Rivers Conference
- American Southwest Conference
- Atlantic East Conference (Note: The Atlantic East will disband at the end of the 2026–27 school year, with two of its final six members joining the City University of New York Athletic Conference and the rest joining the United East Conference.)
- Centennial Conference
- City University of New York Athletic Conference
- Coast to Coast Athletic Conference
- College Conference of Illinois and Wisconsin
- Collegiate Conference of the South
- Conference of New England
- Empire 8
- Great Northeast Athletic Conference
- Heartland Collegiate Athletic Conference
- Landmark Conference
- Liberty League
- MAC Commonwealth (Note: The MAC Commonwealth and MAC Freedom are two of the three leagues operated by the Middle Atlantic Conferences. Men's and women's soccer are both among the 14 sports that are sponsored by both the Commonwealth and Freedom leagues; an additional 13 sports are organized under the banner of Middle Atlantic Conference (singular).)
- MAC Freedom
- Massachusetts State Collegiate Athletic Conference
- Michigan Intercollegiate Athletic Association
- Midwest Conference
- Minnesota Intercollegiate Athletic Conference
- New England Small College Athletic Conference
- New England Women's and Men's Athletic Conference
- New Jersey Athletic Conference
- North Atlantic Conference
- North Coast Athletic Conference
- Northern Athletics Collegiate Conference
- Northwest Conference
- Ohio Athletic Conference
- Old Dominion Athletic Conference
- Presidents' Athletic Conference
- St. Louis Intercollegiate Athletic Conference
- Skyline Conference
- Southern Athletic Association
- Southern California Intercollegiate Athletic Conference
- Southern Collegiate Athletic Conference
- State University of New York Athletic Conference
- United East Conference (Note: Absorbed the former Colonial States Athletic Conference after the 2022–23 school year.)
- University Athletic Association
- Upper Midwest Athletic Conference
- USA South Athletic Conference
- Wisconsin Intercollegiate Athletic Conference
- NCAA Division III independent schools

=== NAIA ===
The National Association of Intercollegiate Athletics (NAIA) also sponsors intercollegiate soccer in the United States. Unlike the National Collegiate Athletic Association (NCAA), which divides its soccer programs among three divisions, the NAIA conducts its men's and women's soccer championships within a single competitive division.

The NAIA began sponsoring a men's national soccer championship in 1959. The 2025 tournament was the 67th annual NAIA Men's Soccer National Championship. The association began its women's soccer championship in 1984, with the 2025 tournament marking the 42nd annual NAIA Women's Soccer National Championship.

NAIA teams compete in conferences across the United States, with conference performance serving as one route to the national tournament. Conferences with at least six participating men's soccer programs receive one automatic qualifier to the national championship, while conferences with at least 12 receive two. The remaining places in the national tournament are filled through at-large selections.

The national championships use opening-round competition at campus sites before advancing 16 teams to a centralized final site. In the men's tournament, first- and second-round games are played at host institutions, with the 16 advancing teams continuing to the final site for a single-elimination tournament. The women's championship uses a similar format, with teams advancing through first- and second-round competition at campus sites before 16 teams reach the championship final site.

The NAIA has 21 member conferences, including nine that sponsor football. Member institutions that are not a part of any of these conferences play in the Continental Athletic Conference, formerly the Association of Independent Institutions.

==== List of NAIA Conferences ====
- American Midwest Conference (AMC)
- Appalachian Athletic Conference (AAC) *
- California Pacific Conference (Cal Pac)
- Cascade Collegiate Conference (CCC)
- Chicagoland Collegiate Athletic Conference (CCAC)
- Continental Athletic Conference (CAC)
- Crossroads League (CL)
- Frontier Conference (Frontier) *
- Great Plains Athletic Conference (GPAC) *
- Great Southwest Athletic Conference (GSAC)
- HBCU Athletic Conference (HBCUAC)
- Heart of America Athletic Conference (HAAC) *
- Kansas Collegiate Athletic Conference (KCAC) *
- Mid-South Conference (MSC) *
- Mid-States Football Association (MSFA) †
- Red River Athletic Conference (RRAC)
- River States Conference (RSC)
- Sooner Athletic Conference (SAC) *
- Southern States Athletic Conference (SSAC)
- Sun Conference (TSC) *
- Wolverine–Hoosier Athletic Conference (WHAC)

*- Denotes that the conference sponsors football.

†- Denotes a football-only conference.

=== National college soccer awards ===
- Hermann Trophy
- Soccer America Player of the Year
- ISAA Player of the Year
- ISAA Goalkeeper of the Year
- NSCAA Coach of the Year

== United Kingdom ==
In the United Kingdom, the BUCS Football League governs association football at universities and colleges. There are currently over 500 teams spread across the league, making it the largest sport in higher education in the UK.

== Asia ==
=== India ===
The Khelo India University Games is a national level multi-sport event held in India, featuring men's and women's college soccer tournaments, where athletes from universities across the country compete.

=== Japan ===
The All Japan University Football Championship and the All Japan Women's University Football Championship are the main tournaments for universities across Japan. Both events are attended by 24 colleges and universities that have qualified. A different qualifying series will be held each year. The 2022 edition of both men's and women's tournaments are taking place between December 2022 and January 2023.

In addition, there is the Prime Minister Cup All Japan University Soccer Tournament (ja:総理大臣杯全日本大学サッカートーナメント), which has a completely open format regarding the competing teams.

There are also university soccer leagues in each region of Japan. In addition, there is a tournament called the Denso Cup (ja:デンソーカップサッカー), which is divided into eight regions in Japan, with each region organizing its own university student teams, and the teams play against each other.

In Japan, sports introduced from overseas during the Meiji era (1868-1912) were introduced as part of education, and schools and other educational institutions had their own teams. Soccer is no exception, and the vestiges of this tradition continue for a long time. Until the establishment of the old Japan Soccer League, which consisted mainly of amateur adult players, after the 1964 Tokyo Olympics, the Japan national football team consisted mainly of university students and their graduates. The Japan League teams also did not have training academies, but instead recruited players who had played for high school (see also:Japan High School Soccer ja:高校サッカー) or university teams. In other words, Japanese university soccer teams were a valuable source of supply for Japan League teams. Therefore, from 1993, when the professional J.League was founded and had a training organization, until 1998 FIFA World Cup, many of the members of the Japanese national team were university graduates. (Note: When Japan made its first appearance at the 1998 World Cup in France, Hidetoshi Nakata was shown on a BBC TV program expressing his ambitions, saying, "The chances of winning are not zero percent," but host Gary Lineker flatly denied it, saying, "It's impossible".The word on the street was that an academic tournament could be won. The national team for the tournament included seven university graduates who had been students before the start of the J.League in 1993. Lineker had played in the J.League since 1993 and was well-versed in the Japanese soccer scene.)

Many college soccer players in Japan, which has a similar "college soccer to national team" pipeline as found in the United States, have gone on to represent their national teams. Nine players of the Japan national football team at the 2022 FIFA World Cup have a college soccer background.

Since 1993, the majority of the players who joined the J. League clubs came from developmental organizations and immediately after high school, rather than from the universities. Japan national under-20 football team was also composed mainly of university soccer players for many years. However, the under-20 football team that reached the final of the 1999 FIFA World Youth Championship had only three university soccer players. The rest were players who had already joined J.League clubs. After 1993, the majority of players who joined university teams were players who were not scouted by J.League clubs. However, there were still cases where players were selected to the Japan national under-20 football team or scouted by J.League clubs after developing their skills in university soccer teams, Universities remained the source of players.

In the 2022 national soccer team, college graduates will have more opportunities to play for their teams than immediate high school graduates. If a player is good enough to be selected for the national team, he can be an immediate asset, whether at university or when he joins a professional club, even if he has just joined. This meant that they could gain more game experience. Following this, Japan national under-23 football team that competed in the 2020 Summer Olympics, on which the 2022 national team was based, was also going to employ a large number of university students. Kaoru Mitoma, a member of the Japan national football team at the 2022 FIFA World Cup, chose to go to university even though he could have joined the J.League team. School of Physical Education, Health and Sport Sciences University of Tsukuba, where Kaoru Mitoma went to school, has produced many Japan national football team players. It is also a national research institute that has reigned for many years in Japan as an institution that researches soccer.

In Japan, unlike European clubs, there are no youth football leagues for the U19 to U23 age groups, which correspond to university students. Since J.League clubs also do not field teams for these age groups, even if a player joins a J.League club, if they lack the ability to play for the top team at that point, they have no playing opportunities unless they are loaned to a lower-tier club (like J2 or J3) to gain playing time. Consequently, the 2025 J.League Board of Directors resolved to establish a new competition, tentatively named the “U-21 J.League,” primarily targeting players aged 21 and under.

However, even active university student players can participate in J.League matches while maintaining their student status through the “Special License Players System.” For details, see Ja:特別指定選手 and Ja:特別指定選手としてJリーグクラブに登録された選手一覧.

When Japanese players go abroad to play soccer, they generally pass through the J.League, but since the 2010s, an increasing number of players have joined soccer leagues outside of Japan immediately after passing through a developmental organization. Even in this case, many players go abroad after graduating from high school. However, in the case of Kein Satō (ja:佐藤恵允), a member of the Japan national under-23 football team that is aiming to participate in the 2024 Summer Olympics, his previous club was Meiji University, which also produced Yuto Nagatomo, before he joined the Bundesliga club.

The Japan Universiade National Team (ja:ユニバーシアードサッカー日本代表) won the Football at the Summer Universiade in 1995, 2001, 2003, 2005, 2011, 2017, and 2019, The team has won a total of seven times in the Football at the Summer Universiade.

The All-Japan University Selection Team traveled to Italy from August 4 to 16, 2025, and played five matches there, drawing 1-1 with Genoa CFC and Cesena FC, losing 0-1 to Hellas Verona FC, and a 4-1 win against Milan Futuro. On the 15th, without a break, they played a friendly match against Serie A's Fiorentina and won 2-1, drawing international attention to the high level of Japanese university soccer.

The Japan national team that won the 2026 AFC U-23 Asian Cup in January 2026 was also composed of U21 players, two years younger than the regulation age, and included many university students under 20. They had to play matches during daylight hours in the high temperatures of Saudi Arabia, with only two days between group stage matches. However, Japanese university soccer teams benefit from summer vacation periods allowing ample training time. They also hold summer training camps in cooler locations, giving them some acclimatization to hot conditions. Research has been conducted regarding health, fatigue recovery, and safety aspects under such conditions.

Regarding women's university soccer in Japan, as of December 2008, 64 universities are members of the Japan University Women's Football Association, and 1,261 players are registered with the Japan Football Association (JFA). Until then, the registered players in university soccer were not of a high level, as many of them started playing soccer at university. However, since the late 2000s, the number of registered players has increased, and top-level players from high school teams have chosen to play at the university level due to their success in the Universiade, and the level of university soccer has improved.

In the case of women's soccer, past Universiade results show five runner-ups and two third-place finishes, indicating that Japanese women's university soccer is at a level where it is always in a position to challenge for the world championship.

The All Japan Women's University Football Championship, one of the main and most prestigious university women's soccer tournaments in Japan, decides the university championship, with teams that have won their regional and playoff rounds competing for the championship in the preliminary league and then the final tournament. In addition, the "National University Women's Soccer Tsukuba Festival" is held every August with the participation of more than 30 teams. In addition, there are regional tournaments that were started to strengthen the 2001 Summer Universiade. These regional tournaments have developed from the East-West tournaments in the past and have played a role in strengthening university women's soccer.

=== South Korea ===
The university association football competition is called the U-League. Created in 2008, it is the first organized league competition for university association football teams and operates outside of the regular Korean association football league structure.

Many college soccer players in South Korea, which has a similar "college soccer to national team" pipeline as found in the United States, have gone on to represent their national teams. Historically, a majority of players who represented the South Korea national under-20 football team played soccer in college. The team's most successful result was reaching the finals of the 2019 FIFA U-20 World Cup. Similarly, the South Korea women's national under-20 football team also has players from college soccer. In the 2022 FIFA U-20 Women's World Cup, 16 players of the 21-woman squad were in college.

=== Philippines ===
The UAAP Football Championship is contested by the eight member schools of the University Athletic Association of the Philippines. NCAA Philippines also sponsors a football tournament.

=== Thailand ===
Many of Thai association footballers are graduated or once studied at the universities. University tournament also many competitions in Thailand, like Chang U-Champion Cup, Football Thailand University Championship and also University U-21 League. Association football are also featured in University Games of Thailand.

=== Vietnam ===
The university association football competition is called the SV-League, which is held annually among teams of university students.

== Canada ==
Due to its proximity to the United States, a large majority of members of the Canada women's national under-20 soccer team play in the NCAA. In the 2022 FIFA U-20 Women's World Cup, 19 of the 22-woman squad played in the NCAA, and in the competition's next edition in 2024, this number was 15 out of 21. Christine Sinclair, captain of the Canada women's national soccer team, played for the Portland Pilots women's soccer team from 2001 to 2005.

In Canada, two organizations regulate university and collegiate athletics:

U Sports

- Atlantic University Sport (AUS)
- Canada West Universities Athletic Association (CWUAA)
- Ontario University Athletics (OUA)
- Réseau du sport étudiant du Québec (RSEQ; translates to Quebec Student Sports Federation)

Canadian Colleges Athletic Association

- Atlantic Colleges Athletic Association (ACAA)
- Réseau du sport étudiant du Québec (RSEQ)
- Ontario Colleges Athletic Association (OCAA)
- Alberta Colleges Athletic Conference (ACAC)
- British Columbia Colleges Athletic Association (BCCAA)

== South Africa ==
Varsity Football is a yearly tournament contested by South African universities in the intercollegiate league Varsity Sports (South Africa). As of the 2022 season, 8 teams participate in each of the men's and women's divisions.

== See also ==
- Canadian Colleges Athletic Association (CCAA)
- Canadian Colleges Athletic Association Soccer National Championships
- College athletics in the United States
- University and college sport
- U Sports
- University and college sport
