= Moeno Sakaguchi =

Japanese footballer

Moeno Sakaguchi 阪口 萌乃
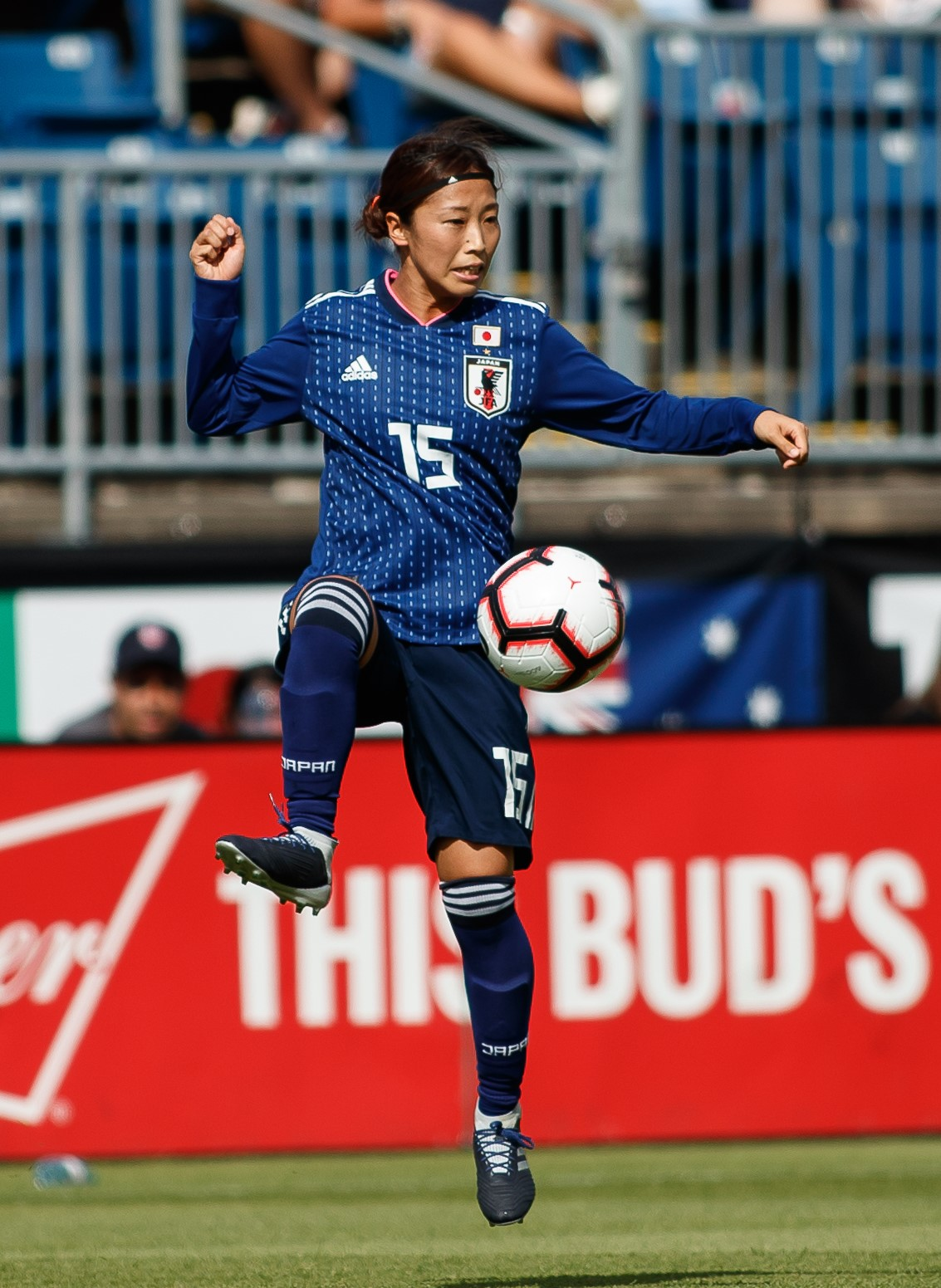

Personal information
- Full name: Moeno Sakaguchi
- Date of birth: June 4, 1992 (age 34)
- Place of birth: Kanagawa, Japan
- Height: 1.57 m (5 ft 2 in)
- Position: Midfielder

Team information
- Current team: INAC Kobe Leonessa
- Number: 15

Youth career
- 2008–2010: Fujieda Junshin High School
- 2011–2012: Musashigaoka College

Senior career*
Years	Team	Apps	(Gls)
2013–2019	Albirex Niigata	118	(15)
2020–	INAC Kobe Leonessa	0	(0)
Total		118	(15)

International career^{‡}
2018–2019	Japan	12	(1)
Medal record
Albirex Niigata
Runner-up	Empress's Cup	2013
Runner-up	Empress's Cup	2015
Runner-up	Empress's Cup	2016
Representing Japan
AFC Women's Asian Cup
Gold medal – first place	2018 Jordan
Asian Games
Gold medal – first place	2018 Jakarta-Palembang	Team
- * Club domestic league appearances and goals as of December 31, 2018 ‡ National team caps and goals as of December 17, 2019

Moeno Sakaguchi (阪口 萌乃, Sakaguchi Moeno; born June 4, 1992) is a Japanese footballer who plays as a midfielder. She plays for INAC Kobe Leonessa in the WE League and the Japan national team.

== Club career ==
Sakaguchi was born in Kanagawa Prefecture on June 4, 1992. After graduating from Musashigaoka College, she joined L.League club Albirex Niigata in 2013.

== National team career ==
In April 2018, Sakaguchi was selected Japan national team for 2018 Women's Asian Cup. Although she did not play in the match, Japan team won the champions for 2 tournament in a row. On June 10, she debuted as substitute midfielder from the second half against New Zealand. She played 10 games and scored 1 goal for Japan.

== National team statistics ==
Japan national team
Year	Apps	Goals
2018	10	1
2019	2	0
Total	12	1

== International goals ==
Scores and results list Japan's goal tally first.

No.	Date	Venue	Opponent	Score	Result	Competition
1.	26 July 2018	Children's Mercy Park, Kansas City, United States	United States	2–4	2–4	2018 Tournament of Nations
