= Megumi Kamionobe =

Japanese footballer

Megumi Kamionobe 上尾野辺 めぐみ
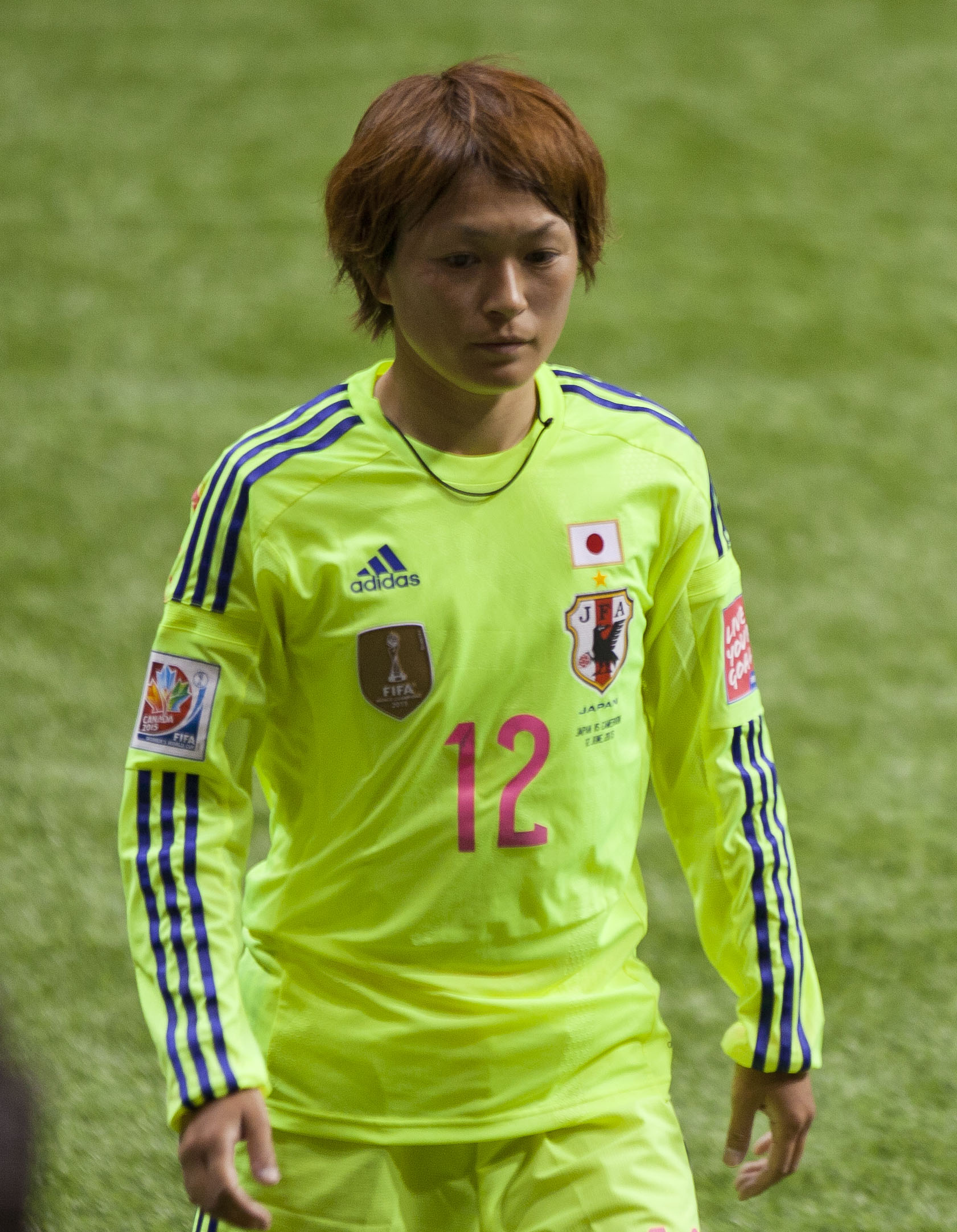
- Kamionobe in 2015

Personal information
- Full name: Megumi Kamionobe
- Date of birth: 15 March 1986 (age 40)
- Place of birth: Yokohama, Kanagawa, Japan
- Height: 1.57 m (5 ft 2 in)
- Position: Midfielder

Team information
- Current team: Albirex Niigata
- Number: 10

Youth career
- 1998–2003: Yamato Sylphid
- 2004–2005: Musashigaoka College

Senior career*
Years	Team	Apps	(Gls)
2006–	Albirex Niigata	253	(77)
Total		253	(77)

International career
2009–2016	Japan	34	(2)
Medal record
Albirex Niigata
Runner-up	Empress's Cup	2011
Runner-up	Empress's Cup	2013
Runner-up	Empress's Cup	2015
Runner-up	Empress's Cup	2016
Representing Japan
FIFA Women's World Cup
Gold medal – first place	2011 Germany
Silver medal – second place	2015 Canada
AFC Women's Asian Cup
Gold medal – first place	2014 Vietnam
Bronze medal – third place	2010 China
Asian Games
Gold medal – first place	2010 Guangzhou	Team
- * Club domestic league appearances and goals as of 31 December 2018

Megumi Kamionobe (上尾野辺 めぐみ, Kamionobe Megumi; born 15 March 1986) is a Japanese footballer who plays as a midfielder. She plays for Albirex Niigata and formerly played for the Japan national team.

== Club career ==
Kamionobe was born in Yokohama on 15 March 1986. After graduating from Musashigaoka College, she joined Albirex Niigata in 2006. She was selected in the Best Eleven 5 times (2009, 2010, 2014, 2015 and 2016).

== International career ==
On 1 August 2009, Kamionobe debuted for the Japan national team against France. She was a member of Japan's squad for the 2011 and 2015 World Cups. Japan won the World Cup in 2011 and came second in 2015. She was also a squad member at the 2010 Asian Games and the 2014 Asian Cup. Japan won the championship at both tournaments. She played 34 games and scored 2 goals for Japan until 2016.

== National team statistics ==
Japan national team
Year	Apps	Goals
2009	1	0
2010	10	1
2011	6	1
2012	1	0
2013	5	0
2014	4	0
2015	5	0
2016	2	0
Total	34	2

== International goals ==
No.	Date	Venue	Opponent	Score	Result	Competition
1.	20 May 2010	Chengdu Sports Center, Chengdu, China	Myanmar	8–0	8–0	2010 AFC Women's Asian Cup
2.	9 March 2011	Complexo Desportivo Belavista, Parchal, Portugal	Sweden	1–1	2–1	2011 Algarve Cup
