= 2011 Empress's Cup =

Tournament details
- Country: Japan

Final positions
- Champions: INAC Kobe Leonessa
- Runners-up: Albirex Niigata
- Semifinalists: Okayama Yunogo Belle; Nippon TV Beleza

Statistics of Empress's Cup in the 2011 season.

== Overview ==
It was contested by 32 teams, and INAC Kobe Leonessa won the championship.

== Results ==
=== 1st round ===
- Jumonji High School 2-2 (pen 5–4) Fujieda Junshin High School
- AC Nagano Parceiro 1-4 Kanto Gakuen University
- Ehime FC 5-0 Hokkaido Bunkyo University Meisei High School
- Osaka University of Health and Sport Sciences 2-1 Japan Soccer College
- Tokuyama University 2-1 Shizuoka Sangyo University
- Musashigaoka College 0-3 Kibi International University
- Himeji Dokkyo University 1-3 Norddea Hokkaido
- Sendai University 1-2 Mashiki Renaissance Kumamoto FC

=== 2nd round ===
- Waseda University 6-2 Jumonji High School
- Kanto Gakuen University 0-3 AS Elfen Sayama FC
- Je Vrille Kagoshima 0-1 Ehime FC
- Osaka University of Health and Sport Sciences 2-4 Tokiwagi Gakuken High School
- Hoo High School 4-2 Tokuyama University
- Kibi International University 4-2 Speranza FC Takatsuki
- JFA Academy Fukushima 5-0 Norddea Hokkaido
- Mashiki Renaissance Kumamoto FC 2-7 Hinomoto Gakuen High School

=== 3rd round ===
- INAC Kobe Leonessa 1-0 Waseda University
- AS Elfen Sayama FC 1-0 Fukuoka J. Anclas
- JEF United Chiba 2-0 Ehime FC
- Tokiwagi Gakuken High School 1-3 Okayama Yunogo Belle
- Albirex Niigata 7-0 Hoo High School
- Kibi International University 3-4 Urawa Reds
- Iga FC Kunoichi 2-0 JFA Academy Fukushima
- Hinomoto Gakuen High School 0-5 Nippon TV Beleza

=== Quarterfinals ===
- Iga FC Kunoichi 0-1 Nippon TV Beleza
- JEF United Chiba 0-2 Okayama Yunogo Belle
- Albirex Niigata 1-0 Urawa Reds
- INAC Kobe Leonessa 2-0 AS Elfen Sayama FC

=== Semifinals ===
- INAC Kobe Leonessa 4-1 Okayama Yunogo Belle
- Albirex Niigata 2-1 Nippon TV Beleza

=== Final ===
- INAC Kobe Leonessa 3-0 Albirex Niigata

INAC Kobe Leonessa won the championship.
