= Fubuki Kuno =

Japanese footballer

Fubuki Kuno 久野 吹雪
Personal information
- Full name: Fubuki Kuno
- Date of birth: December 27, 1989 (age 36)
- Place of birth: Fujisawa, Kanagawa, Japan
- Height: 1.70 m (5 ft 7 in)
- Position: Goalkeeper

Team information
- Current team: Albirex Niigata
- Number: 31

Youth career
- 2005–2007: Yokosuka FC Seagulls
- 2008–2009: Musashigaoka College

Senior career*
Years	Team	Apps	(Gls)
2010–2011	INAC Kobe Leonessa	0	(0)
2012–2017	Iga FC Kunoichi	70	(0)
2018–2025	Nojima Stella	18	(0)
2025–	Albirex Niigata		
Total		88	(0)

International career
2013	Japan	1	(0)
Medal record
INAC Kobe Leonessa
Winner	Nadeshiko League	2011
Winner	Empress's Cup	2010
Winner	Empress's Cup	2011
Representing Japan
AFC U-16 Women's Championship
Gold medal – first place	2005 South Korea
- * Club domestic league appearances and goals as of December 31, 2018

Fubuki Kuno (久野 吹雪, Kuno Fubuki; born December 27, 1989) is a Japanese footballer who plays as a goalkeeper. She plays for Albirex Niigata Ladies and has also played for Japan national team.

== Club career ==
Kuno was born in Fujisawa on December 27, 1989. After graduating from Musashigaoka College, she joined INAC Kobe Leonessa in 2010. She moved to Iga FC Kunoichi in 2012. She plays 70 matches in L.League. In 2018, she moved to Nojima Stella Kanagawa Sagamihara.

== National team career ==
In March 2013, Kuno was selected by the Japan national team for the 2013 Algarve Cup. On March 6, she debuted against Norway.

== National team statistics ==
Japan national team
Year	Apps	Goals
2013	1	0
Total	1	0
