= Aimi Kunitake =

Japanese footballer

Aimi Kunitake 國武 愛美
Personal information
- Full name: Aimi Kunitake
- Date of birth: January 10, 1997 (age 29)
- Place of birth: Yamato, Kumamoto, Japan
- Height: 1.61 m (5 ft 3 1/2 in)
- Position: Defender

Team information
- Current team: Mynavi Sendai
- Number: 5

Youth career
- 2012–2014: Hinomoto Gakuen High School
- 2015–2016: Musashigaoka College

Senior career*
Years	Team	Apps	(Gls)
2017–2019	Nojima Stella Kanagawa Sagamihara	36	(1)
2020-	Mynavi Sendai	35	(0)
Total		71	(1)

International career
2018	Japan	3	(0)
Medal record
Nojima Stella Kanagawa Sagamihara
Runner-up	Empress's Cup	2017
Representing Japan
Asian Games
Gold medal – first place	2018 Jakarta-Palembang	Team
- * Club domestic league appearances and goals as of December 31, 2018

Aimi Kunitake (國武 愛美, Kunitake Aimi; born January 10, 1997) is a Japanese footballer who plays as a defender. She plays for Mynavi Sendai and the Japan national team.

== Club career ==
Kunitake was born in Yamato, Kumamoto on January 10, 1997. After graduating from Musashigaoka College, she joined L.League club Nojima Stella Kanagawa Sagamihara in 2017. She became a regular player as a center back and played all 18 matches in her first season.

== National team career ==
On July 29, 2018, Kunitake debuted for the Japan national team against Brazil. She played three games for Japan in 2018.

== National team statistics ==
Japan national team
Year	Apps	Goals
2018	3	0
Total	3	0
