= Marumi Yamazaki =

Japanese footballer (born 1990)

Personal information
- Date of birth: June 9, 1990 (age 36)
- Place of birth: Saitama, Japan
- Height: 1.66 m (5 ft 5 1/2 in)
- Position: Midfielder

Senior career*
Years	Team	Apps	(Gls)
2006–2007	AS Elfen Sayama FC	38	(28)
2009–2016	Albirex Niigata	101	(34)
2016–2017	AC Nagano Parceiro	20	(3)
2018–2020	JEF United Chiba	18	(2)
2021–2023	Omiya Ardija Ventus	0	(0)
Total		177	(67)

International career
2013	Japan	4	(0)
Medal record
Albirex Niigata
Runner-up	Empress's Cup	2011
Runner-up	Empress's Cup	2013
Runner-up	Empress's Cup	2015
Runner-up	Empress's Cup	2016
Representing Japan
AFC U-19 Women's Championship
Gold medal – first place	2009 China
Silver medal – second place	2007 China
- * Club domestic league appearances and goals as of December 31, 2018

Marumi Yamazaki (山崎 円美, Yamazaki Marumi; born June 9, 1990) is a Japanese former footballer who played as a midfielder. He played for JEF United Chiba and has also played for the Japan national team. Yamazaki is a trans man and played women's association football before transitioning after his retirement.

== Club career ==
Yamazaki was born in Saitama Prefecture on June 9, 1990. When he was high school student, he played for his local club AS Elfen Sayama FC. After graduating from high school, he joined Albirex Niigata in 2009. In June 2016, he moved to AC Nagano Parceiro. In 2018, he moved to JEF United Chiba. He retired from professional soccer in 2023.

== National team career ==
In March 2013, Yamazaki was selected Japan national team for 2013 Algarve Cup. At this competition, on March 6, he debuted against Norway. He played 4 games for Japan in 2013.

== Personal life ==
In January 2026, Yamazaki came out as a transgender man and announced his marriage.

== National team statistics ==
Japan national team
Year	Apps	Goals
2013	4	0
Total	4	0
