= 2013 Empress's Cup =

Tournament details
- Country: Japan

Final positions
- Champions: INAC Kobe Leonessa
- Runners-up: Albirex Niigata
- Semifinalists: Okayama Yunogo Belle; Iga FC Kunoichi

Statistics of Empress's Cup in the 2013 season.

== Overview ==
It was contested by 36 teams, and INAC Kobe Leonessa won the championship.

== Results ==
=== 1st round ===
- Osaka University of Health and Sport Sciences 2-2 (pen 4-5) Nippon Sport Science University
- Fukuoka J. Anclas 1-4 Ehime FC
- Kanto Gakuen University 3-1 Fujieda Junshin High School
- Nojima Stella Kanagawa 1-2 Hinomoto Gakuen High School
- Naruto Uzushio High School 0-3 Fukui University of Technology Fukui High School
- Hoo High School 2-0 Cerezo Osaka Sakai
- AC Nagano Parceiro 0-5 AS Elfen Sayama FC
- Angeviolet Hiroshima 2-3 Shizuoka Sangyo University
- Kamimura Gakuen High School 3-0 Hokkaido Bunkyo University Meisei High School
- Mashiki Renaissance Kumamoto FC 0-6 JFA Academy Fukushima
- Waseda University 3-0 Sendai University
- Shimizudaihachi Pleiades 1-2 Japan Soccer College

=== 2nd round ===
- Nippon Sport Science University 1-4 Ehime FC
- Kanto Gakuen University 2-8 Kibi International University
- Tokiwagi Gakuken High School 0-6 Hinomoto Gakuen High School
- Fukui University of Technology Fukui High School 1-2 Hoo High School
- AS Elfen Sayama FC 2-0 Shizuoka Sangyo University
- Kamimura Gakuen High School 1-6 Sfida Setagaya FC
- Speranza FC Osaka-Takatsuki 4-1 JFA Academy Fukushima
- Waseda University 4-0 Japan Soccer College

=== 3rd round ===
- INAC Kobe Leonessa 10-0 Ehime FC
- Kibi International University 2-1 Urawa Reds
- Iga FC Kunoichi 3-1 Hinomoto Gakuen High School
- Hoo High School 0-10 Vegalta Sendai
- Okayama Yunogo Belle 4-3 AS Elfen Sayama FC
- Sfida Setagaya FC 2-5 JEF United Chiba
- Albirex Niigata 3-0 Speranza FC Osaka-Takatsuki
- Waseda University 0-4 Nippon TV Beleza

=== Quarterfinals ===
- INAC Kobe Leonessa 7-0 Kibi International University
- Iga FC Kunoichi 2-1 Vegalta Sendai
- Okayama Yunogo Belle 2-0 JEF United Chiba
- Albirex Niigata 1-0 Nippon TV Beleza

=== Semifinals ===
- Albirex Niigata 1-0 Okayama Yunogo Belle
- INAC Kobe Leonessa 3-2 Iga FC Kunoichi

=== Final ===
- INAC Kobe Leonessa 2-2 (pen 4-3) Albirex Niigata

INAC Kobe Leonessa won the championship.
