= Tezukayama Gakuin University =

Coordinates: 34°29′30″N 135°32′43″E

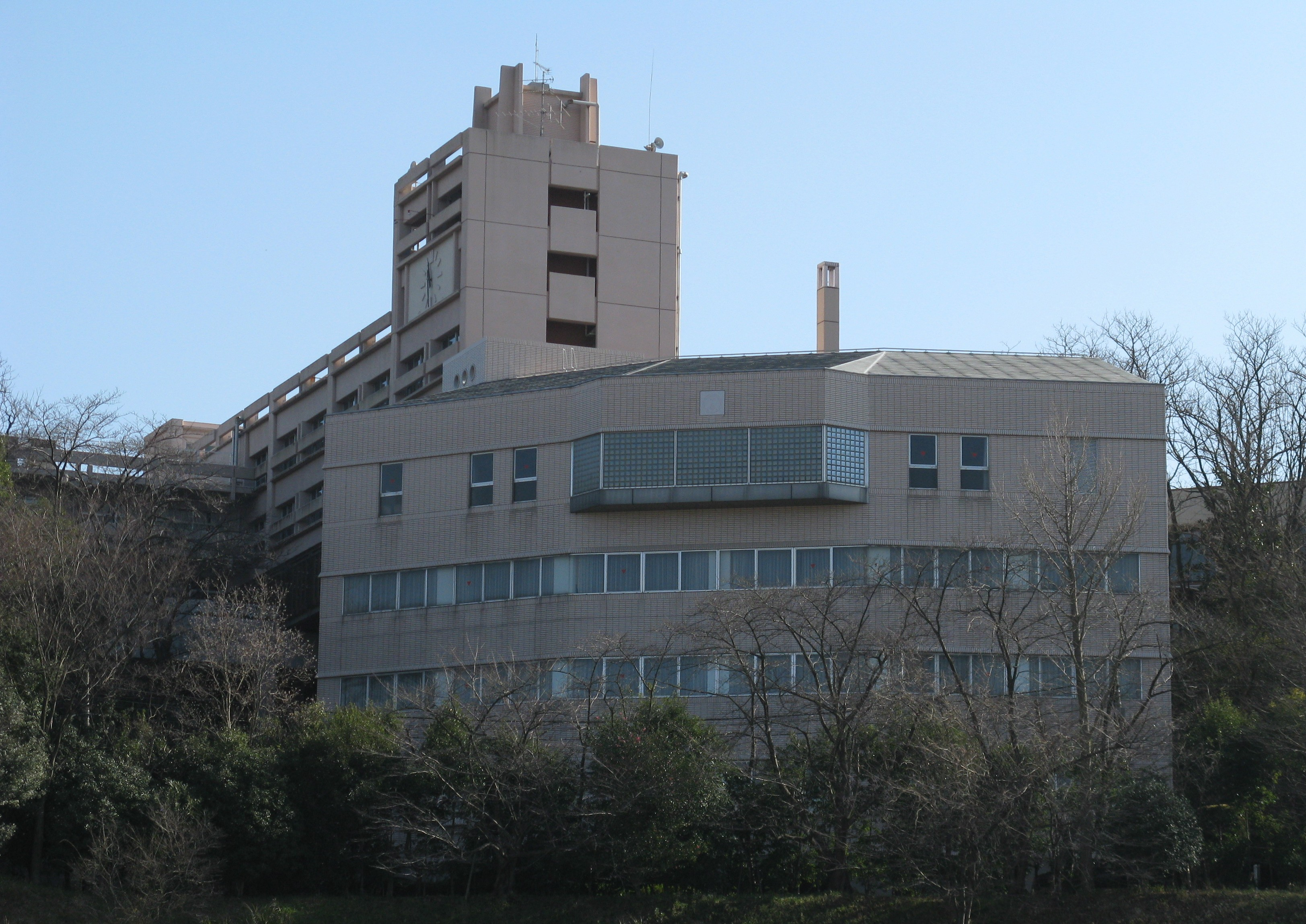
Sayama campus in Ōsakasayama

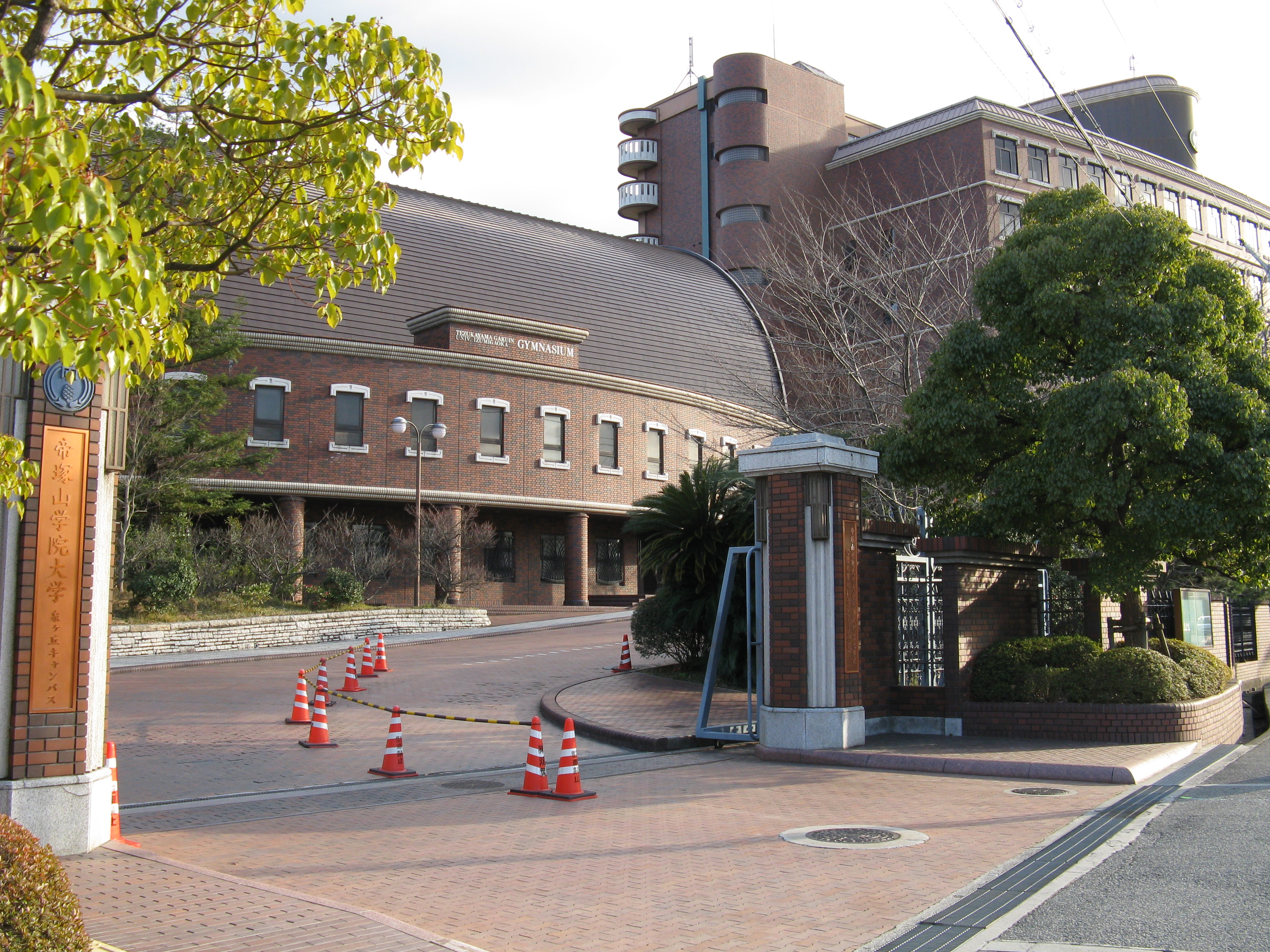
Izumigaoka campus in Sakai

Tezukayama Gakuin University (帝塚山学院大学, Tezukayama gakuin daigaku) is a private university with campuses in the cities of Ōsakasayama and Sakai in Osaka Prefecture, Japan. The predecessor of the school was founded in 1916, and it was chartered as a junior women's college in 1950. In 2007, the school became coeducational.
