= Osaka University of Health & Sports Science Junior College =

Osaka University of Health＆Sports Science Junior College
- 大阪体育大学短期大学部
- Type: Private
- Established: 2000
- Location: Kumatori, Osaka, Japan
- Website: www.ouhs.jp/ouhsjrc/introduction/index.html

Osaka University of Health & Sports Science Junior College (大阪体育大学短期大学部, Osaka Taiiku Daigaku Tanki Daigakubu) was a private junior college in Kumatori, Osaka, Japan. It was established in 1989 as a vocational school, and became a junior college in 2000, abolished in 2011.
