= Teikyo Heisei University =

Private university in Tokyo, Japan

Coordinates: 35°30′17.91″N 140°10′22.96″E

- 帝京平成大学
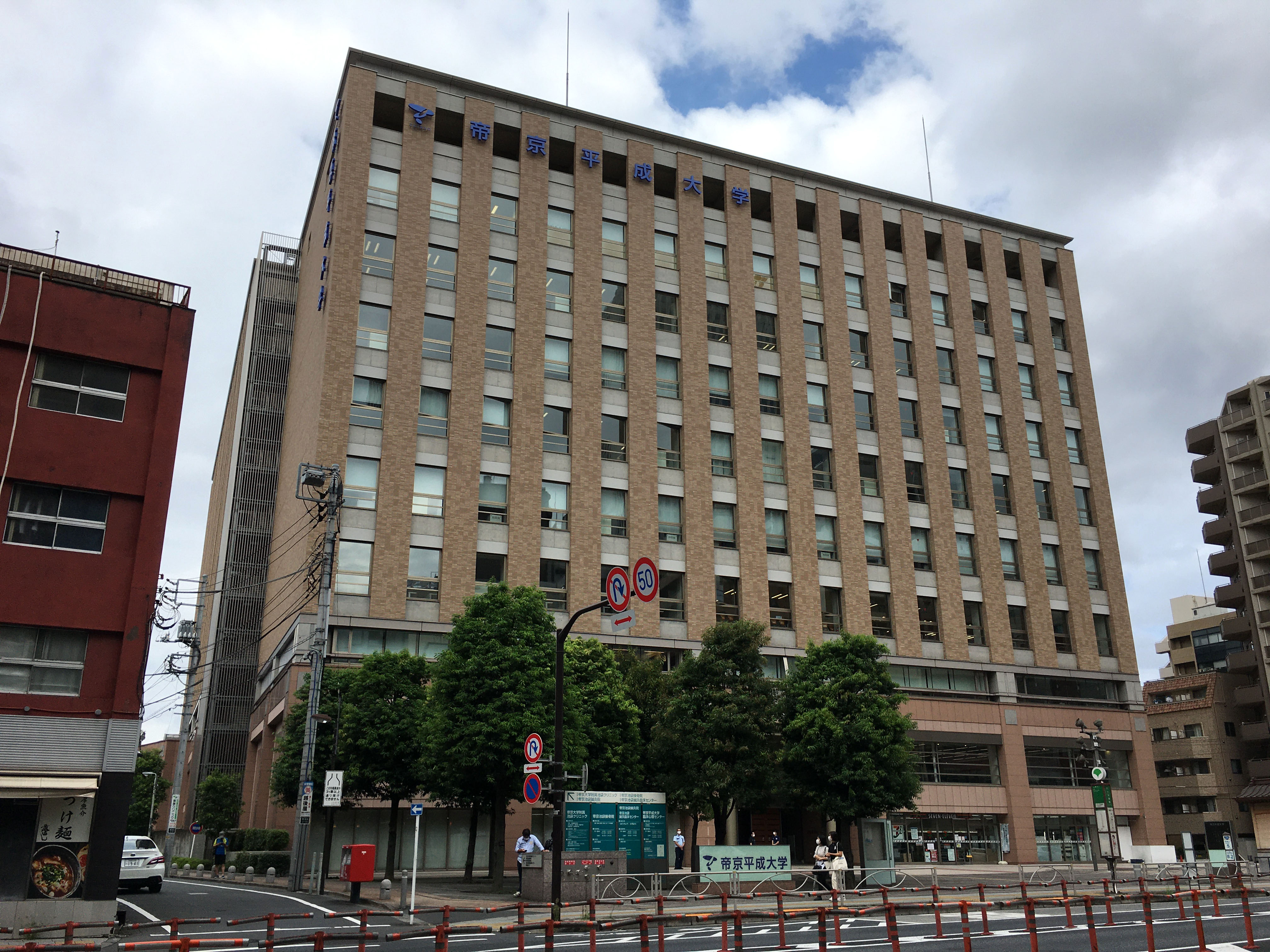
- Ikebukuro Campus (Toshima, Tokyo)
- Type: Private
- Established: 1987
- Location: Toshima, Tokyo, Japan
- Website: www.thu.ac.jp

Teikyo Heisei University (帝京平成大学, Teikyō Heisei Daigaku) is a private university in Toshima, Tokyo, Japan.

== Overviews ==
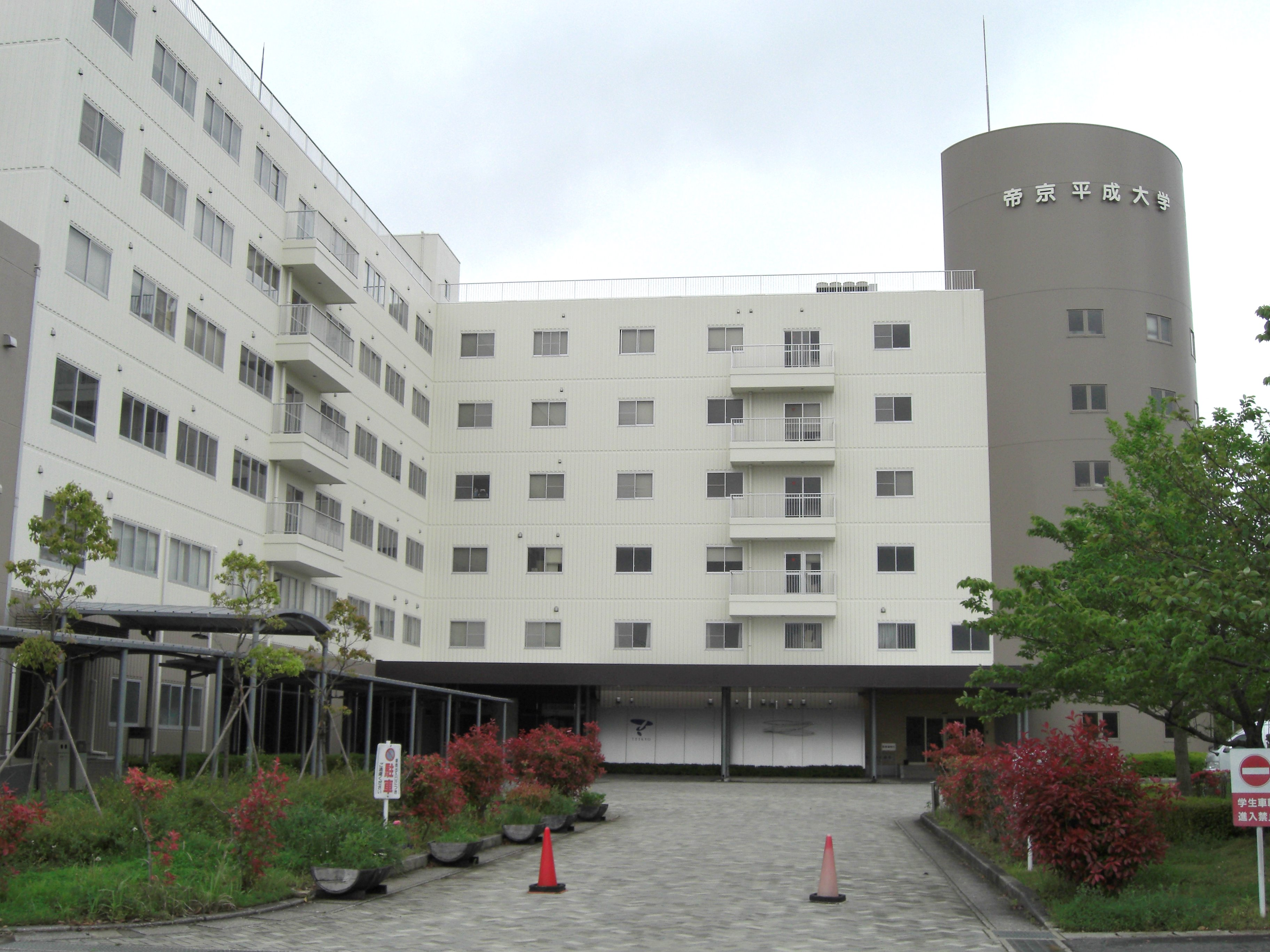
Chiba Campus (Ichihara, Chiba)

Teikyo University of Technology (帝京技術科学大学, Teikyō Gijutsu Kagaku Daigaku) was established in April, 1987. Teikyo University of Technology changed its name to Teikyo Heisei University in April, 1995. It has become an urban university centered on medical, health, welfare, information and education.
