= Kanto Gakuen University =

Private university in Ōta, Gunma, Japan

- 関東学園大学
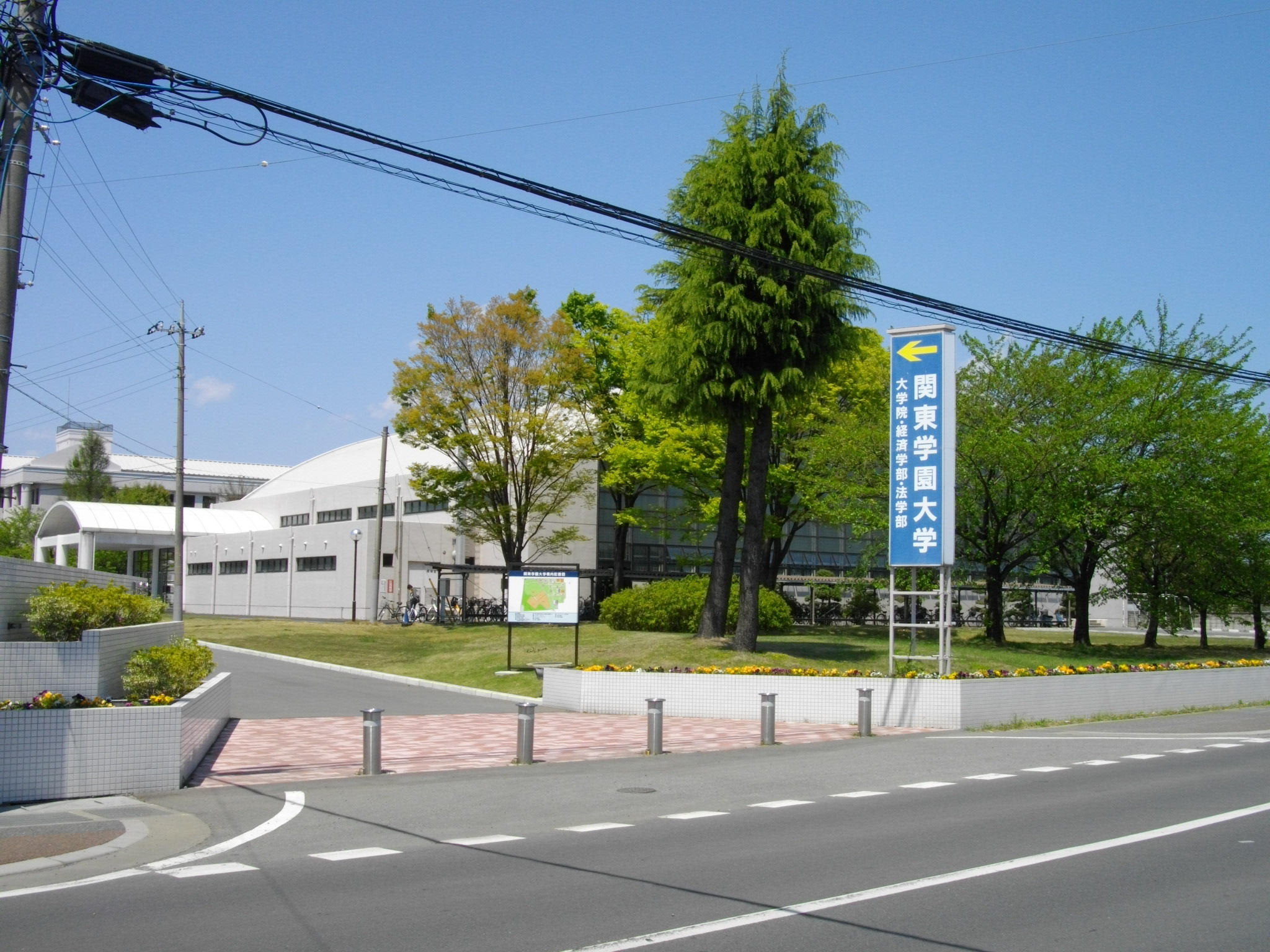
- Type: Private
- Established: Founded 1924; Chartered 1976
- President: Tōru Haneda
- Academic staff: 29 (2026)
- Students: 479 (2026)
- Location: 200 Fujiaguchō, Ōta, Gunma, 373-8515, Japan; 36°17′09″N 139°21′19″E
- Website: Official website

Kanto Gakuen University (関東学園大学, Kantō gakuen daigaku) is a private university in Ōta, Gunma, Japan, established in 1976.

The university has an affiliated high school, Kanto Gakuen University Senior High School, in Tatebayashi, Gunma.
