= Kibi International University =

University in Okayama Prefecture, Japan

Coordinates: 34°47′51″N 133°37′27″E

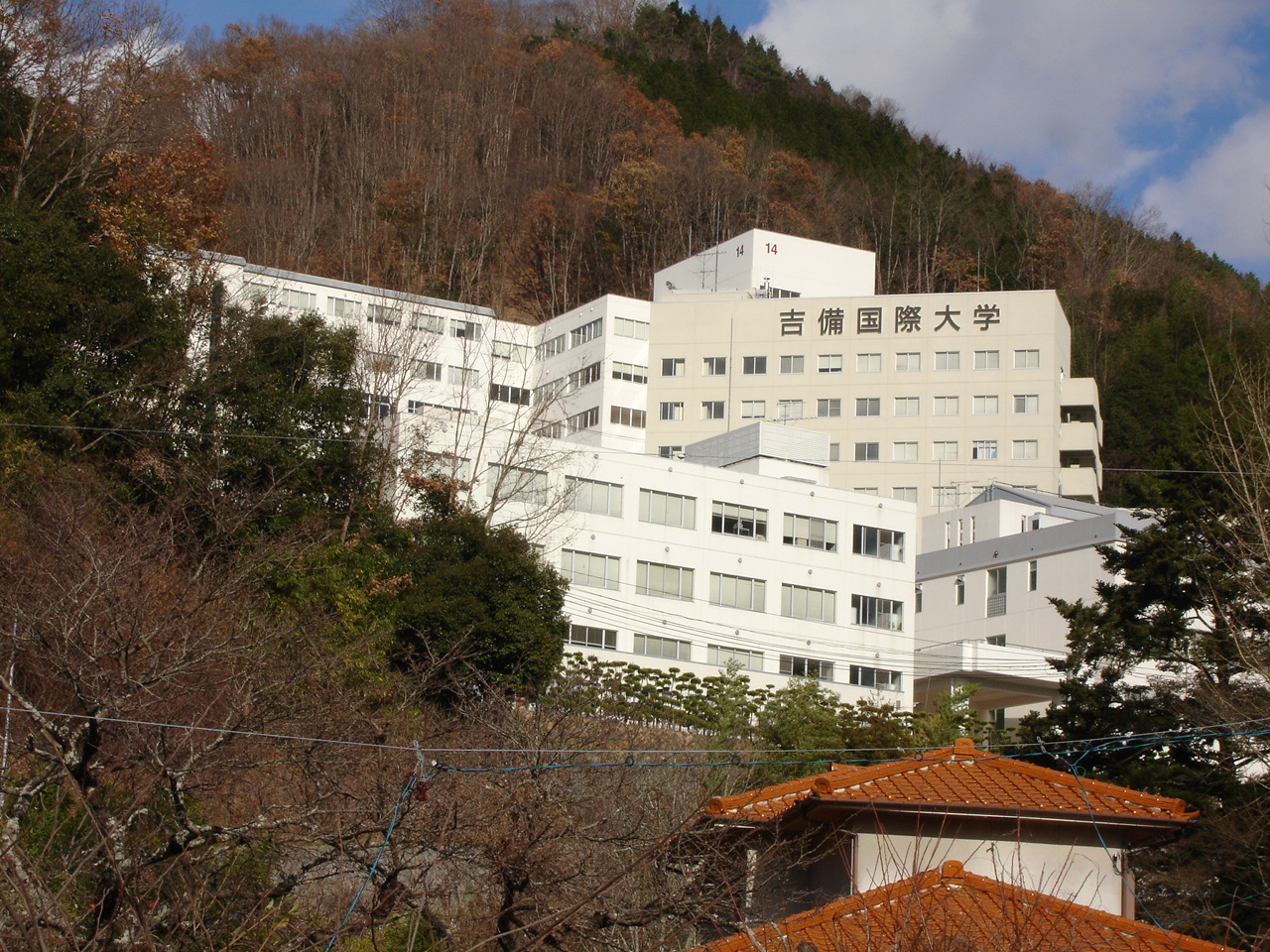
Kibi International University

Kibi International University (吉備国際大学, Kibi kokusai daigaku) is a private university in Takahashi, Okayama, Japan, established in 1990.
