= Shizuoka Sangyo University =

Coordinates: 34°41′52″N 137°51′35″E

- 静岡産業大学
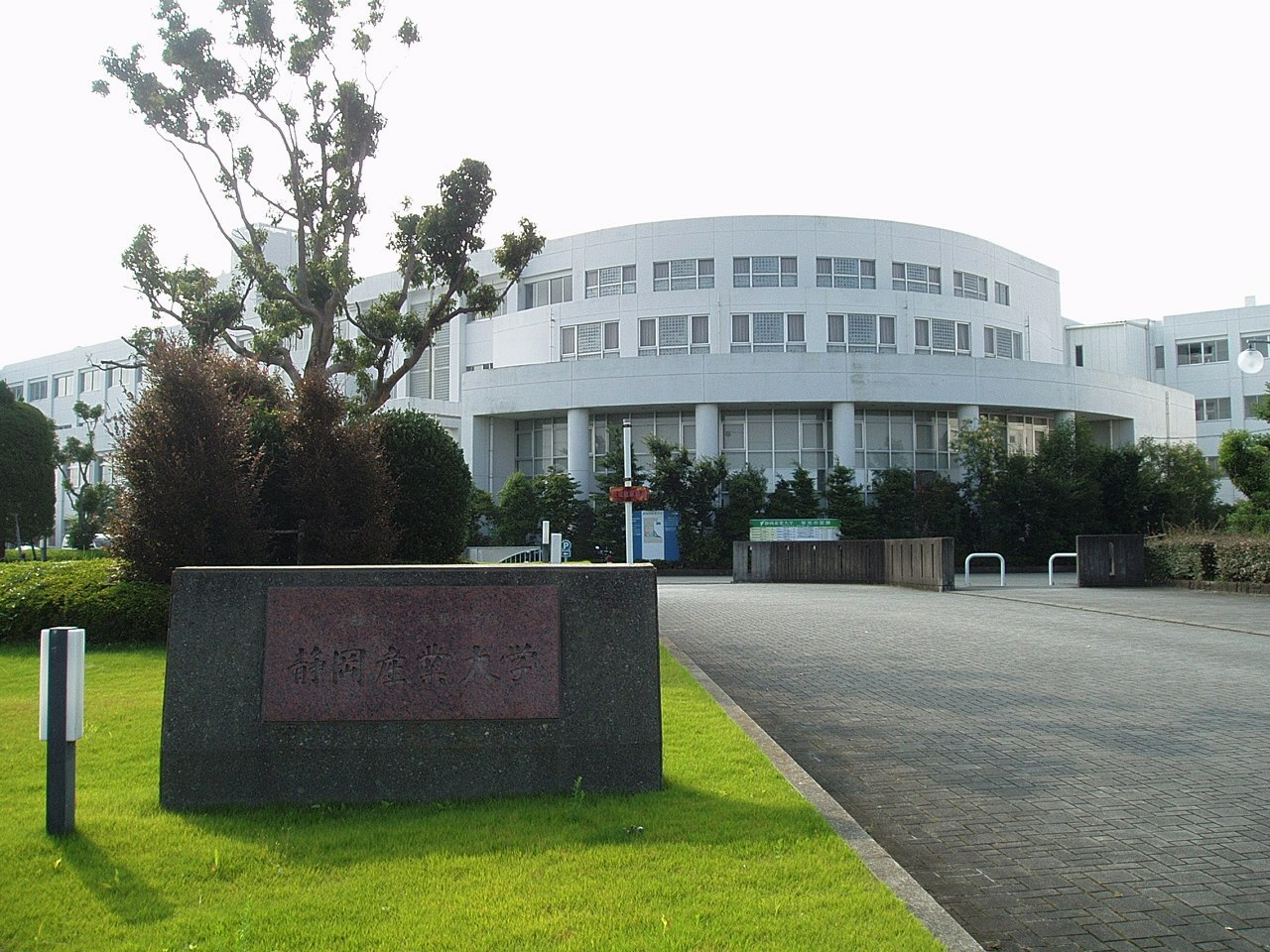
- Iwata Campus
- Type: Private
- Established: 1988
- Location: 1572-1 Ohara, Iwata-shi, Shizuoka-ken 422-8545, Iwata, Shizuoka, Japan
- Campus: Iwata, Fujieda
- Website: www.ssu.ac.jp

Shizuoka Sangyo University (静岡産業大学, Shizuoka Sangyō Daigaku) is a private university in Iwata city, Shizuoka Prefecture, Japan, established in 1988.

== Location ==
- Iwata Campus (1572-1 Ohara, Iwata City, Shizuoka Prefecture)
- Fujieda Campus (4-1-1 Surugadai, Fujieda City, Shizuoka Prefecture)

== Organization ==
(as of July 2014)

=== Undergraduate schools ===
==== School of Management ====
- Department of Management
  - Courses: Marketing, Regional Management, and Accounting & Finance.
- Department of Sports Management
  - Courses: Sports Management, Sports Education, and Preschool Sports.

==== School of Information Studies ====
- Department of Information Design
  - Courses: Visual Expression, Advertising Design, System Design, and Public Management.
- Department of Communication Studies
  - Courses: Regional Business, Tourism Management, International Business, and Public Management.

=== Facilities ===
==== Campuses ====
===== Iwata Campus =====
- Undergraduate schools: School of Business
- Graduate schools: None
- Other facilities: General Library
- Access: JR Tōkaidō Main Line, Iwata Station

===== Fujieda Campus =====
- Undergraduate schools: School of Information Studies
- Graduate schools: None
- Other facilities: Fujieda Library
- Access: JR Tōkaidō Main Line, Fujieda Station
