= Musashigaoka College =

College in Saitama Prefecture, Japa

Coordinates: 36°2′8.3″N 139°25′21.7″E

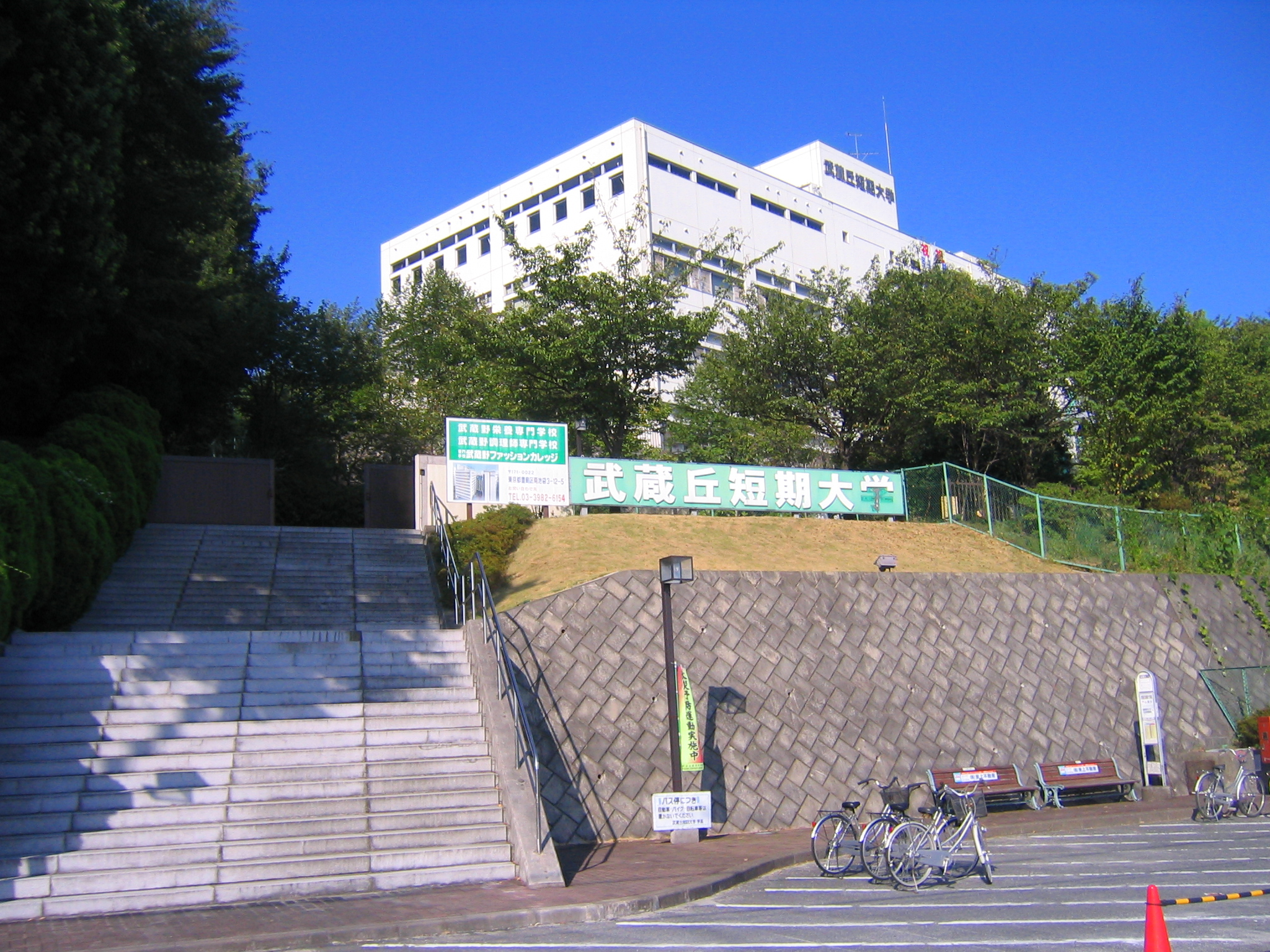
Musashigaoka College

Musashigaoka College (武蔵丘短期大学, Musashigaoka tanki daigaku) is a private junior college in Yoshimi, Saitama, Japan, established in 1991.
