= Japan women's national football team results (2010–2019) =

This page records the details of the Japan women's national football team from 2010 to 2019.

== 2010 ==
=== Results ===
2010.01.13	Japan	1–0	Denmark	Chile
	Yamaguchi (?)

2010.01.15	Japan	1–1	Chile	Chile
	Iwashimizu (?)		? (?)

2010.01.21	Japan	4–2	Colombia	Chile
	Ando (?); Takase (?); Sudo (?)		? (?) ? (?)

2010.01.23	Japan	3–0	Argentina	Chile
	Nakano (?); Ando (?); Yamaguchi (?)

2010.02.06	Japan	2–0	China	Tokyo, Japan
	Miyama (?); Kinga (?)			Stadium: Tokyo Stadium

2010.02.11	Japan	3–0	Chinese Taipei	Tokyo, Japan
	Iwabuchi (?); Takase (?)			Stadium: National Stadium

2010.02.13	Japan	2–1	South Korea	Tokyo, Japan
	Ono (?); Yamaguchi (?)		? (?)	Stadium: Tokyo Stadium

2010.05.08	Japan	4–0	Mexico	Nagano, Japan
	Kinga (?); Takase (?); Ono (?)			Stadium: Matsumotodaira Football Stadium

2010.05.11	Japan	3–0	Mexico	Niigata, Japan
	Ono (?); Minamiyama (?)			Stadium: Niigata Stadium

2010.05.20	Japan	8–0	Myanmar	China
	Iwashimizu (?); Sawa (?); Yamaguchi (?); Sameshima (?); Miyama (?); Kamionobe (?)

2010.05.22	Japan	4–0	Thailand	China
	Takase (?); Nakano (?); Utsugi (?); Ando (?)

2010.05.24	Japan	2–1	North Korea	China
	Ando (?); Nagasato (?)		? (?)

2010.05.27	Japan	0–1	Australia	China
			? (?)

2010.05.30	Japan	2–0	China	China
	Ando (?); Sawa (?)

2010.11.14	Japan	4–0	Thailand	China
	Kitamoto (?); Ono (?); Sakaguchi (?) (?)

2010.11.18	Japan	0–0	North Korea	China

2010.11.20	Japan	1–0	China	China
	Ono (?)

2010.11.22	Japan	1–0	North Korea	China
	Iwashimizu (?)

=== Players statistics ===
Player	−2009	01.13	01.15	01.21	01.23	02.06	02.11	02.13	05.08	05.11	05.20	05.22	05.24	05.27	05.30	11.14	11.18	11.20	11.22	2010	Total
Homare Sawa	146(72)	-	O	-	O	O	O	O	O	O	O(2)	O	-	O	O(1)	O	O	O	O	15(3)	161(75)
Nozomi Yamago	88(0)	-	-	-	O	-	-	O	O	-	-	O	-	-	-	-	O	O	O	7(0)	95(0)
Kozue Ando	71(11)	-	O	O(2)	O(1)	-	-	-	-	-	O	O(1)	O(1)	O	O(1)	-	-	-	-	8(6)	79(17)
Aya Miyama	69(20)	O	O	O	O	O(1)	O	O	-	O	O(1)	O	O	O	O	O	O	O	O	17(2)	86(22)
Shinobu Ono	68(27)	-	O	O	O	O	-	O(1)	O(2)	O(1)	O	-	-	-	-	O(1)	O	O(1)	O	12(6)	80(33)
Yuki Nagasato	55(28)	-	-	-	-	-	-	-	-	-	-	-	O(1)	O	O	-	-	-	-	3(1)	58(29)
Kyoko Yano	52(1)	-	O	-	O	O	-	O	O	O	O	-	O	O	-	O	O	O	O	13(0)	65(1)
Miho Fukumoto	47(0)	O	-	-	-	-	O	-	-	O	-	-	O	-	-	-	-	-	-	4(0)	51(0)
Azusa Iwashimizu	44(5)	-	O(1)	-	O	O	O	O	O	-	O(1)	O	-	O	O	-	O	O	O(1)	13(3)	57(8)
Yukari Kinga	40(2)	O	O	-	O	O(1)	-	O	O(1)	O	O	-	O	O	O	O	O	O	O	15(2)	55(4)
Mizuho Sakaguchi	29(14)	-	-	-	-	-	-	-	-	-	-	-	-	-	-	O(1)	O	O	O	4(1)	33(15)
Rumi Utsugi	29(4)	O	-	O	-	O	-	O	O	-	-	O(1)	O	O	O	-	-	-	-	9(1)	38(5)
Nayuha Toyoda	19(0)	-	-	-	-	-	-	-	O	O	-	O	-	-	-	-	-	-	-	3(0)	22(0)
Ayako Kitamoto	12(3)	-	O	-	-	-	-	-	-	-	-	-	-	-	-	O(1)	O	O	O	5(1)	17(4)
Akiko Sudo	8(2)	O	-	O(1)	-	-	O	-	O	O	O	-	-	O	-	-	-	-	-	7(1)	15(3)
Ayumi Kaihori	6(0)	-	-	O	-	O	-	-	O	-	O	-	-	O	O	O	-	-	-	7(0)	13(0)
Aya Sameshima	5(1)	O	O	O	O	O	O	O	O	-	O(1)	-	O	O	O	O	-	O	O	15(1)	20(2)
Nahomi Kawasumi	3(0)	-	-	-	-	-	-	-	-	O	-	O	O	-	O	O	O	-	O	7(0)	10(0)
Mami Yamaguchi	2(1)	O(1)	O	-	O(1)	O	O	O(1)	-	-	O(2)	O	O	O	O	O	O	O	-	14(5)	16(6)
Saki Kumagai	2(0)	-	O	-	O	O	O	O	O	O	O	-	O	O	O	O	O	O	O	15(0)	17(0)
Megumi Kamionobe	1(0)	O	-	O	-	-	-	-	-	O	O(1)	O	O	O	-	-	O	O	O	10(1)	11(1)
Megumi Takase	0(0)	-	O	O(1)	O	-	O(1)	O	O(1)	-	O	O(1)	-	-	-	O	O	O	O	12(4)	12(4)
Manami Nakano	0(0)	O	-	O	O(1)	-	O	O	O	O	-	O(1)	O	-	-	O	-	-	-	10(2)	10(2)
Yuika Sugasawa	0(0)	O	-	O	-	-	O	-	O	O	-	O	-	-	-	-	-	-	-	6(0)	6(0)
Chiaki Minamiyama	0(0)	-	-	-	-	-	-	-	O	O(2)	-	O	O	-	-	-	-	-	-	4(2)	4(2)
Mana Iwabuchi	0(0)	-	-	-	-	O	O(2)	O	-	-	-	-	-	-	-	-	-	-	-	3(2)	3(2)
Kana Osafune	0(0)	O	-	O	-	-	O	-	-	-	-	-	-	-	-	-	-	-	-	3(0)	3(0)
Nanase Kiryu	0(0)	O	-	O	-	-	O	-	-	-	-	-	-	-	-	-	-	-	-	3(0)	3(0)
Natsuko Hara	0(0)	O	O	-	-	-	-	-	-	-	-	-	-	-	-	-	-	-	-	2(0)	2(0)
Yuri Kawamura	0(0)	O	-	O	-	-	-	-	-	-	-	-	-	-	-	-	-	-	-	2(0)	2(0)
Sawako Yasumoto	0(0)	-	-	-	-	-	-	-	O	O	-	-	-	-	-	-	-	-	-	2(0)	2(0)
Erina Yamane	0(0)	-	O	-	-	-	-	-	-	-	-	-	-	-	-	-	-	-	-	1(0)	1(0)
Asako Ideue	0(0)	-	-	-	-	-	-	-	-	O	-	-	-	-	-	-	-	-	-	1(0)	1(0)
Yuiko Konno	0(0)	-	-	-	-	-	-	-	-	O	-	-	-	-	-	-	-	-	-	1(0)	1(0)

== 2011 ==
=== Results ===
2011.03.02	Japan	1–2	United States	Portugal
	Miyama (?)		? (?) ? (?)

2011.03.04	Japan	5–0	Finland	Portugal
	Ono (?); Kawasumi (?); Nagasato (?); Yamaguchi (?)

2011.03.07	Japan	1–0	Norway	Portugal
	Nagasato (?)

2011.03.09	Japan	2–1	Sweden	Portugal
	Kamionobe (?); Kawasumi (?)		? (?)

2011.05.14	Japan	0–2	United States	United States
			? (?) ? (?)

2011.05.18	Japan	0–2	United States	United States
			? (?) ? (?)

2011.06.18	Japan	1–1	South Korea	Ehime, Japan
	Miyama (?)		? (?)	Stadium: Ehime Matsuyama Athletic Stadium

2011.06.27	Japan	2–1	New Zealand	Germany
	Nagasato (?); Miyama (?)		? (?)

2011.07.01	Japan	4–0	Mexico	Germany
	Sawa (?); Ono (?)

2011.07.05	Japan	0–2	England	Germany
			? (?) ? (?)

2011.07.09	Japan	1–0	Germany	Germany
	Maruyama (?)

2011.07.13	Japan	3–1	Sweden	Germany
	Kawasumi (?); Sawa (?)		? (?)

2011.07.17	Japan	2–2 (pen 3–1)	United States	Germany
	Miyama (?); Sawa (?)		? (?) ? (?)

2011.09.01	Japan	3–0	Thailand	China
	Kawasumi (?); Tanaka (?) (?)

2011.09.03	Japan	2–1	South Korea	China
	Sakaguchi (?); Ono (?)		? (?)

2011.09.05	Japan	1–0	Australia	China
	Kawasumi (?)

2011.09.08	Japan	1–1	North Korea	China
	(?)		? (?)

2011.09.11	Japan	1–0	China	China
	Tanaka (?)

=== Players statistics ===
Player	−2010	03.02	03.04	03.07	03.09	05.14	05.18	06.18	06.27	07.01	07.05	07.09	07.13	07.17	09.01	09.03	09.05	09.08	09.11	2011	Total
Homare Sawa	161(75)	O	O	O	O	O	O	O	O	O(3)	O	O	O(1)	O(1)	-	O	O	O	-	16(5)	177(80)
Nozomi Yamago	95(0)	-	-	-	O	-	-	-	-	-	-	-	-	-	-	-	-	-	-	1(0)	96(0)
Aya Miyama	86(22)	O(1)	O	O	O	O	O	O(1)	O(1)	O	O	O	O	O(1)	O	O	O	O	O	18(4)	104(26)
Shinobu Ono	80(33)	O	O(1)	O	O	O	O	O	O	O(1)	O	O	O	O	O	O(1)	O	O	-	17(3)	97(36)
Kozue Ando	79(17)	O	O	O	O	O	O	O	O	O	O	O	O	O	O	O	O	O	O	18(0)	97(17)
Eriko Arakawa	69(20)	O	O	-	O	-	-	-	-	-	-	-	-	-	-	-	-	-	-	3(0)	72(20)
Kyoko Yano	65(1)	O	-	O	-	-	-	-	-	-	-	-	-	-	O	-	-	-	O	4(0)	69(1)
Karina Maruyama	60(13)	-	-	-	-	-	O	O	O	-	O	O(1)	-	O	-	-	O	-	O	8(1)	68(14)
Yuki Nagasato	58(29)	O	O(1)	O(1)	O	O	-	O	O(1)	O	O	O	O	O	O	O	O	O	O	17(3)	75(32)
Azusa Iwashimizu	57(8)	O	O	O	O	O	O	O	O	O	O	O	O	O	-	O	O	O	O	17(0)	74(8)
Yukari Kinga	55(4)	O	O	O	O	O	O	O	O	O	O	O	O	O	O	O	O	O	-	17(0)	72(4)
Miho Fukumoto	51(0)	O	-	O	-	-	O	-	-	-	-	-	-	-	O	-	-	-	O	5(0)	56(0)
Rumi Utsugi	38(5)	O	O	O	-	O	O	-	-	O	-	O	-	-	O	-	-	-	O	9(0)	47(5)
Mizuho Sakaguchi	33(15)	O	O	-	-	O	O	O	O	O	O	O	O	O	-	O(1)	O	O	-	14(1)	47(16)
Aya Sameshima	20(2)	O	O	O	O	O	O	O	O	O	O	O	O	O	O	O	O	O	O	18(0)	38(2)
Saki Kumagai	17(0)	O	O	-	O	O	O	O	O	O	O	O	O	O	O	O	O	O	-	16(0)	33(0)
Mami Yamaguchi	16(6)	-	O(2)	O	-	-	-	-	-	-	-	-	-	-	-	-	-	-	-	2(2)	18(8)
Ayumi Kaihori	13(0)	-	O	O	-	O	O	O	O	O	O	O	O	O	-	O	O	O	-	14(0)	27(0)
Megumi Takase	12(4)	O	-	O	O	O	-	-	-	-	-	-	O	-	O	-	-	-	O	7(0)	19(4)
Megumi Kamionobe	11(1)	-	O	-	O(1)	-	-	-	-	-	-	-	O	-	O	O	-	-	O	6(1)	17(2)
Nahomi Kawasumi	10(0)	O	O(1)	-	O(1)	-	O	-	-	O	O	-	O(2)	O	O(1)	O	O(1)	O	O	13(6)	23(6)
Mana Iwabuchi	3(2)	-	-	-	-	O	O	O	O	O	O	O	-	O	-	-	-	-	-	8(0)	11(2)
Asano Nagasato	3(0)	-	-	-	-	-	-	-	-	-	-	-	-	-	-	-	-	-	O	1(0)	4(0)
Maiko Nasu	2(0)	-	-	-	-	-	O	-	-	-	-	-	-	-	-	-	-	-	-	1(0)	3(0)
Asuna Tanaka	0(0)	-	O	-	O	-	-	O	O	-	-	-	-	-	O(1)	-	-	-	O(1)	6(2)	6(2)
Emi Nakajima	0(0)	-	-	-	-	O	O	-	-	-	-	-	-	-	-	-	-	-	-	2(0)	2(0)
Akane Saito	0(0)	-	-	-	O	-	-	-	-	-	-	-	-	-	-	-	-	-	-	1(0)	1(0)
Yuki Sakai	0(0)	-	-	-	O	-	-	-	-	-	-	-	-	-	-	-	-	-	-	1(0)	1(0)

== 2012 ==
=== Results ===
2012.02.29	Japan	2–1	Norway	Portugal
	Nagasato (?); Kawasumi (?)		? (?)

2012.03.02	Japan	2–0	Denmark	Portugal
	Sugasawa (?); Ono (?)

2012.03.05	Japan	1–0	United States	Portugal
	Takase (?)

2012.03.07	Japan	3–4	Germany	Portugal
	Kawasumi (?); Tanaka (?); Nagasato (?)		? (?) ? (?) ? (?) ? (?)

2012.04.01	Japan	1–1	United States	Miyagi, Japan
	Kinga (?)		? (?)	Stadium: Sendai Stadium

2012.04.05	Japan	4–1	Brazil	Hyogo, Japan
	(?); Nagasato (?); Miyama (?); Sugasawa (?)		? (?)	Stadium: Kobe Wing Stadium

2012.06.18	Japan	1–4	United States	Sweden
	Nagasato (?)		? (?) ? (?) ? (?) ? (?)

2012.06.20	Japan	1–0	Sweden	Sweden
	Nagasato (?)

2012.07.11	Japan	3–0	Australia	Tokyo, Japan
	Miyama (?); Ogimi (?); Sawa (?)			Stadium: National Stadium

2012.07.19	Japan	0–2	France	France
			? (?) ? (?)

2012.07.25	Japan	2–1	Canada	England
	Kawasumi (?); Miyama (?)		? (?)

2012.07.28	Japan	0–0	Sweden	England

2012.07.31	Japan	0–0	South Africa	Wales

2012.08.03	Japan	2–0	Brazil	Wales
	Ogimi (?); Ono (?)

2012.08.06	Japan	2–1	France	England
	Ogimi (?); Sakaguchi (?)		? (?)

2012.08.09	Japan	1–2	United States	England
	Ogimi (?)		? (?) ? (?)

=== Players statistics ===
Player	−2011	02.29	03.02	03.05	03.07	04.01	04.05	06.18	06.20	07.11	07.19	07.25	07.28	07.31	08.03	08.06	08.09	2012	Total
Homare Sawa	177(80)	O	-	-	-	-	-	O	O	O(1)	O	O	O	-	O	O	O	10(1)	187(81)
Aya Miyama	104(26)	O	O	O	O	O	O(1)	O	O	O(1)	O	O(1)	O	O	O	O	O	16(3)	120(29)
Shinobu Ono	97(36)	O	O(1)	O	O	O	O	O	O	O	O	O	O	-	O(1)	O	O	15(2)	112(38)
Kozue Ando	97(17)	-	-	O	O	O	O	O	O	O	O	O	O	O	O	O	-	13(0)	110(17)
Yuki Ogimi	75(32)	O(1)	O	O	O(1)	O	O(1)	O(1)	O(1)	O(1)	O	O	O	O	O(1)	O(1)	O(1)	16(9)	91(41)
Azusa Iwashimizu	74(8)	-	O	O	O	-	-	-	-	O	O	O	O	O	O	O	O	11(0)	85(8)
Yukari Kinga	72(4)	O	O	O	O	O(1)	O	O	-	O	O	O	O	O	O	O	O	15(1)	87(5)
Kyoko Yano	69(1)	-	-	-	-	O	O	O	-	O	-	-	-	O	-	-	-	5(0)	74(1)
Karina Maruyama	68(14)	-	-	-	-	-	-	O	O	O	-	-	-	O	-	-	O	5(0)	73(14)
Miho Fukumoto	56(0)	-	O	O	-	-	O	-	O	O	O	O	O	-	O	O	O	11(0)	67(0)
Mizuho Sakaguchi	47(16)	O	-	O	O	O	-	O	O	O	O	O	O	O	O	O(1)	O	14(1)	61(17)
Rumi Utsugi	47(5)	O	O	O	O	O	O	O	-	-	-	-	-	-	-	-	-	7(0)	54(5)
Aya Sameshima	38(2)	O	-	O	O	O	O	O	O	O	O	O	O	-	O	O	O	14(0)	52(2)
Saki Kumagai	33(0)	O	O	O	O	O	O	O	O	O	O	O	O	O	O	O	O	16(0)	49(0)
Ayumi Kaihori	27(0)	O	-	-	O	O	-	O	-	O	O	-	-	O	-	-	-	7(0)	34(0)
Nahomi Kawasumi	23(6)	O(1)	O	O	O(1)	O	O	O	O	O	O	O(1)	O	O	O	O	O	16(3)	39(9)
Megumi Takase	19(4)	O	O	O(1)	O	-	O	O	O	O	-	-	-	O	O	-	-	10(1)	29(5)
Megumi Kamionobe	17(2)	-	-	-	-	-	-	-	O	-	-	-	-	-	-	-	-	1(0)	18(2)
Mana Iwabuchi	11(2)	-	-	-	-	-	-	-	-	-	O	-	O	O	-	-	O	4(0)	15(2)
Kanako Ito	10(3)	O	O	O	-	-	-	-	-	-	-	-	-	-	-	-	-	3(0)	13(3)
Manami Nakano	10(2)	-	-	-	-	-	O	-	-	-	-	-	-	-	-	-	-	1(0)	11(2)
Asuna Tanaka	6(2)	O	O	O	O(1)	O	O	O	O	O	-	-	O	O	-	O	O	13(1)	19(3)
Yuika Sugasawa	6(0)	-	O(1)	O	-	O	O(1)	-	-	-	-	-	-	-	-	-	-	4(2)	10(2)
Nanase Kiryu	3(0)	-	O	-	O	-	-	-	-	-	-	-	-	-	-	-	-	2(0)	5(0)
Kana Osafune	3(0)	-	-	-	-	-	O	-	-	-	-	-	-	-	-	-	-	1(0)	4(0)
Saori Ariyoshi	0(0)	O	O	-	O	O	-	-	O	-	-	-	-	-	-	-	-	5(0)	5(0)
Mai Kyokawa	0(0)	O	O	-	-	-	-	-	-	-	-	-	-	-	-	-	-	2(0)	2(0)
Yumi Uetsuji	0(0)	-	-	-	-	-	O	-	-	-	-	-	-	-	-	-	-	1(0)	1(0)
Ami Otaki	0(0)	-	-	-	-	-	-	-	O	-	-	-	-	-	-	-	-	1(0)	1(0)

== 2013 ==
=== Results ===
2013.03.06	Japan	0–2	Norway	Portugal
			? (?) ? (?)

2013.03.08	Japan	1–2	Germany	Portugal
	Tanaka (?)		? (?) ? (?)

2013.03.11	Japan	2–0	Denmark	Portugal
	Kawasumi (?); Ogimi (?)

2013.03.13	Japan	1–0	China	Portugal
	Ogimi (?)

2013.06.20	Japan	1–1	New Zealand	Saga, Japan
	Ogimi (?)		? (?)	Stadium: Tosu Stadium

2013.06.26	Japan	1–1	England	England
	Kawasumi (?)		? (?)

2013.06.29	Japan	2–4	Germany	Germany
	Ono (?); Ogimi (?)		? (?) ? (?) ? (?) ? (?)

2013.07.20	Japan	2–0	China	South Korea
	Ando (?); Nakajima (?)

2013.07.25	Japan	0–0	North Korea	South Korea

2013.07.27	Japan	1–2	South Korea	South Korea
	Ogimi (?)		? (?) ? (?)

2013.09.22	Japan	2–0	Nigeria	Nagasaki, Japan
	Ogimi (?); Kawasumi (?)			Stadium: Nagasaki Stadium

2013.09.26	Japan	2–0	Nigeria	Chiba, Japan
	Miyama (?); Sakaguchi (?)			Stadium: Chiba Soga Football Stadium

=== Players statistics ===
Player	−2012	03.06	03.08	03.11	03.13	06.20	06.26	06.29	07.20	07.25	07.27	09.22	09.26	2013	Total
Homare Sawa	187(81)	-	-	-	-	O	-	-	-	-	-	O	-	2(0)	189(81)
Aya Miyama	120(29)	-	-	-	-	O	-	O	O	O	O	O	O(1)	7(1)	127(30)
Shinobu Ono	112(38)	-	-	-	-	O	O	O(1)	O	O	O	-	O	7(1)	119(39)
Kozue Ando	110(17)	-	-	-	-	O	O	O	O(1)	-	O	-	-	5(1)	115(18)
Yuki Ogimi	91(41)	O	O	O(1)	O(1)	O(1)	O	O(1)	O	O	O(1)	O(1)	O	12(6)	103(47)
Yukari Kinga	87(5)	-	-	-	-	-	-	-	-	-	-	O	-	1(0)	88(5)
Azusa Iwashimizu	85(8)	O	O	O	-	O	O	O	O	O	O	-	O	10(0)	95(8)
Karina Maruyama	73(14)	-	-	-	-	O	O	O	-	-	-	O	-	4(0)	77(14)
Miho Fukumoto	67(0)	-	-	-	-	O	-	O	O	-	-	-	-	3(0)	70(0)
Mizuho Sakaguchi	61(17)	-	-	-	-	O	O	O	O	O	O	-	O(1)	7(1)	68(18)
Rumi Utsugi	54(5)	-	O	O	O	O	O	O	O	O	-	-	-	8(0)	62(5)
Aya Sameshima	52(2)	O	O	O	-	-	-	-	-	-	-	-	-	3(0)	55(2)
Saki Kumagai	49(0)	-	O	O	O	O	O	O	O	O	O	-	-	9(0)	58(0)
Nahomi Kawasumi	39(9)	O	O	O(1)	-	O	O(1)	O	O	O	O	O(1)	O	11(3)	50(12)
Ayumi Kaihori	34(0)	-	O	-	-	O	O	-	-	O	O	O	-	6(0)	40(0)
Megumi Takase	29(5)	O	O	O	O	-	-	-	-	O	-	O	-	6(0)	35(5)
Asuna Tanaka	19(3)	O	O	O	O	O	O	O	O	-	O	-	-	9(0)	28(3)
Megumi Kamionobe	18(2)	-	-	-	-	-	O	O	-	O	O	O	-	5(0)	23(2)
Mana Iwabuchi	15(2)	-	-	-	-	-	O	O	O	O	O	-	-	5(0)	20(2)
Manami Nakano	11(2)	-	-	-	-	-	-	-	-	-	-	O	-	1(0)	12(2)
Yuika Sugasawa	10(2)	-	-	-	-	-	-	-	-	-	O	-	O	2(0)	12(2)
Saori Ariyoshi	5(0)	O	O	-	O	O	O	O	O	-	-	-	O	8(0)	13(0)
Nanase Kiryu	5(0)	-	-	-	-	-	-	-	-	-	-	-	O	1(0)	6(0)
Kana Osafune	4(0)	O	-	-	O	-	O	-	-	-	-	-	O	4(0)	8(0)
Asano Nagasato	4(0)	O	-	O	-	-	-	-	-	-	-	-	-	2(0)	6(0)
Michi Goto	2(2)	-	-	-	-	-	-	-	-	-	-	-	O	1(0)	3(2)
Emi Nakajima	2(0)	-	-	O	O	-	O	-	O(1)	O	O	O	-	7(1)	9(1)
Yuri Kawamura	2(0)	O	-	-	-	-	-	-	-	-	-	-	O	2(0)	4(0)
Erina Yamane	1(0)	-	-	O	O	-	-	-	-	-	-	-	O	3(0)	4(0)
Ami Otaki	1(0)	O	-	-	O	-	-	-	-	-	-	-	-	2(0)	3(0)
Mina Tanaka	0(0)	-	O(1)	O	O	-	-	-	-	-	-	-	O	4(1)	4(1)
Yoko Tanaka	0(0)	O	O	-	O	-	-	-	-	-	-	O	-	4(0)	4(0)
Marumi Yamazaki	0(0)	O	-	O	O	-	-	-	-	O	-	-	-	4(0)	4(0)
Yuka Kado	0(0)	O	-	O	O	-	-	-	-	-	-	-	-	3(0)	3(0)
Shiho Ogawa	0(0)	O	-	O	O	-	-	-	-	-	-	-	-	3(0)	3(0)
Mari Kawamura	0(0)	O	-	-	O	-	-	-	-	-	-	-	-	2(0)	2(0)
Fubuki Kuno	0(0)	O	-	-	-	-	-	-	-	-	-	-	-	1(0)	1(0)
Kana Kitahara	0(0)	-	-	-	-	-	-	-	-	-	-	O	-	1(0)	1(0)
Shiori Miyake	0(0)	-	-	-	-	-	-	-	-	-	-	O	-	1(0)	1(0)
Saori Arimachi	0(0)	-	-	-	-	-	-	-	-	-	-	O	-	1(0)	1(0)
Ryoko Takara	0(0)	-	-	-	-	-	-	-	-	-	-	O	-	1(0)	1(0)
Saki Ueno	0(0)	-	-	-	-	-	-	-	-	-	-	-	O	1(0)	1(0)
Rie Azami	0(0)	-	-	-	-	-	-	-	-	-	-	-	O	1(0)	1(0)
Hikari Nakade	0(0)	-	-	-	-	-	-	-	-	-	-	-	O	1(0)	1(0)

== 2014 ==
=== Results ===
2014.03.05	Japan	1–1	United States	Portugal
	Miyama (?)		? (?)

2014.03.07	Japan	1–0	Denmark	Portugal
	Iwabuchi (?)

2014.03.10	Japan	2–1	Sweden	Portugal
	Ogimi (?); Miyama (?)		? (?)

2014.03.12	Japan	0–3	Germany	Portugal
			? (?) ? (?) ? (?)

2014.05.08	Japan	2–1	New Zealand	Osaka, Japan
	Takase (?); Sugasawa (?)		? (?)	Stadium: Nagai Football Stadium

2014.05.14	Japan	2–2	Australia	Vietnam
	(?); Ogimi (?)		? (?) ? (?)

2014.05.16	Japan	4–0	Vietnam	Vietnam
	Kawasumi (?); Kiryu (?); Ogimi (?)

2014.05.18	Japan	7–0	Jordan	Vietnam
	Kira (?); Nakajima (?); Sakaguchi (?) (?)

2014.05.22	Japan	2–1	China	Vietnam
	Sawa (?); Iwashimizu (?)		? (?)

2014.05.25	Japan	1–0	Australia	Vietnam
	Iwashimizu (?)

2014.09.13	Japan	5–0	Ghana	Yamagata, Japan
	Takase (?); Sakaguchi (?); Osafune (?); Nakajima (?)			Stadium: Yamagata Park Stadium

2014.09.15	Japan	0–0	China	South Korea

2014.09.18	Japan	12–0	Jordan	South Korea
	Kawasumi (?); Sugasawa (?); Sakaguchi (?) (?); Kira (?); Miyama (?)

2014.09.22	Japan	3–0	Chinese Taipei	South Korea
	Sakaguchi (?); Kira (?); Kawasumi (?)

2014.09.26	Japan	9–0	Hong Kong	South Korea
	Masuya (?) (?); Nakajima (?); Iwashimizu (?); Kiryu (?); Takase (?); Sugasawa (?)

2014.09.29	Japan	3–0	Vietnam	South Korea
	Sakaguchi (?); Osafune (?); Sugasawa (?)

2014.10.01	Japan	1–3	North Korea	South Korea
	Miyama (?)		? (?) ? (?) ? (?)

2014.10.25	Japan	3–0	Canada	Canada
	Ogimi (?); Kawamura (?); Kawasumi (?)

2014.10.28	Japan	3–2	Canada	Canada
	Nagasato (?); Ogimi (?); Sameshima (?)		? (?) ? (?)

=== Players statistics ===
Player	−2013	03.05	03.07	03.10	03.12	05.08	05.14	05.16	05.18	05.22	05.25	09.13	09.15	09.18	09.22	09.26	09.29	10.01	10.25	10.28	2014	Total
Homare Sawa	189(81)	O	-	O	O	O	-	O	O	O(1)	O	-	-	-	-	-	-	-	-	-	8(1)	197(82)
Aya Miyama	127(30)	O(1)	O	O(1)	O	O	O	O	-	O	O	O	O	O(1)	O	-	O	O(1)	O	O	17(4)	144(34)
Shinobu Ono	119(39)	O	O	O	O	-	-	-	-	-	-	-	-	-	-	-	-	-	O	O	6(0)	125(39)
Kozue Ando	115(18)	-	O	O	O	-	-	-	-	-	-	-	-	-	-	-	-	-	O	-	4(0)	119(18)
Yuki Ogimi	103(47)	O	O	O(1)	O	-	O(1)	O(1)	O	-	-	-	-	-	-	-	-	-	O(1)	O(1)	9(5)	112(52)
Azusa Iwashimizu	95(8)	O	O	O	O	O	O	O	-	O(1)	O(1)	-	-	O	O	O(1)	-	O	-	O	14(3)	109(11)
Yukari Kinga	88(5)	O	-	O	O	-	-	-	-	-	-	-	-	-	-	-	-	-	O	-	4(0)	92(5)
Karina Maruyama	77(14)	-	-	-	-	O	-	O	-	-	-	-	-	-	-	-	-	-	-	-	2(0)	79(14)
Miho Fukumoto	70(0)	-	O	-	-	-	-	O	-	O	O	-	-	-	-	-	-	-	-	O	5(0)	75(0)
Mizuho Sakaguchi	68(18)	O	-	O	O	O	O	-	O(2)	O	O	O(1)	O	O(3)	O(1)	O	O(1)	O	O	O	17(8)	85(26)
Rumi Utsugi	62(5)	O	O	O	O	O	O	O	O	O	O	-	-	-	-	-	-	-	O	O	12(0)	74(5)
Saki Kumagai	58(0)	O	-	O	O	-	-	-	-	-	-	-	-	-	-	-	-	-	O	O	5(0)	63(0)
Aya Sameshima	55(2)	-	-	-	-	-	-	-	-	-	-	-	-	-	-	-	-	-	O	O(1)	2(1)	57(3)
Nahomi Kawasumi	50(12)	O	O	O	O	O	O	O(2)	-	O	O	O	O	O(2)	O(1)	O	O	O	O(1)	-	17(6)	67(18)
Ayumi Kaihori	40(0)	-	-	O	-	-	-	-	O	-	-	O	O	-	-	O	-	O	-	-	6(0)	46(0)
Megumi Takase	35(5)	O	O	O	O	O(1)	O	O	O	O	O	O(2)	O	-	-	O(1)	O	O	O	O	17(4)	52(9)
Asuna Tanaka	28(3)	-	O	-	-	-	-	-	-	-	-	-	-	-	-	-	-	-	-	O	2(0)	30(3)
Megumi Kamionobe	23(2)	O	O	-	-	-	-	O	-	-	-	-	-	-	-	-	-	-	-	O	4(0)	27(2)
Mana Iwabuchi	20(2)	O	O(1)	O	O	-	-	-	-	-	-	-	-	-	-	-	-	-	-	O	5(1)	25(3)
Saori Ariyoshi	13(0)	O	O	O	O	O	O	O	-	O	O	O	O	O	O	-	O	O	O	O	17(0)	30(0)
Yuika Sugasawa	12(2)	-	-	-	-	O(1)	-	O	-	O	O	O	O	O(3)	-	O(1)	O(1)	O	O	O	12(6)	24(8)
Emi Nakajima	9(1)	-	O	-	-	O	O	-	O(2)	O	O	O(1)	O	O	O	O(1)	O	-	-	-	12(4)	21(5)
Kana Osafune	8(0)	-	-	-	-	-	-	-	-	-	-	O(1)	O	O	-	O	O(1)	O	-	-	6(2)	14(2)
Nanase Kiryu	6(0)	O	O	-	-	-	O	O(1)	-	O	-	O	O	O	O	O(2)	-	-	-	-	10(3)	16(3)
Asano Nagasato	6(0)	-	-	-	-	-	-	-	-	-	-	-	-	-	-	-	-	-	-	O(1)	1(1)	7(1)
Erina Yamane	4(0)	O	-	-	O	O	O	-	-	-	-	O	-	O	O	-	O	-	O	-	9(0)	13(0)
Yuri Kawamura	4(0)	-	-	-	-	O	O	O	-	O	O	-	-	-	-	-	-	-	O(1)	O	7(1)	11(1)
Michi Goto	3(2)	-	-	-	-	O	O	-	O	-	O	-	-	-	-	-	-	-	-	-	4(0)	7(2)
Kana Kitahara	1(0)	-	O	-	-	-	-	-	-	-	-	O	O	O	O	-	O	-	-	-	6(0)	7(0)
Chinatsu Kira	0(0)	-	-	-	-	O	O	-	O(2)	O	O	O	O	O(2)	O(1)	O	O	O	-	-	12(5)	12(5)
Rika Masuya	0(0)	-	-	-	-	-	-	-	-	-	-	O	O	O	O	O(2)	O	O	-	-	7(2)	7(2)
Hikaru Naomoto	0(0)	-	-	-	-	O	-	-	O	-	-	O	-	-	O	O	O	-	-	-	6(0)	6(0)
Rie Usui	0(0)	-	-	-	-	-	-	-	-	-	-	O	O	O	O	O	-	O	-	-	6(0)	6(0)
Hisui Haza	0(0)	-	-	-	-	-	-	-	-	-	-	O	-	-	O	O	O	-	-	-	4(0)	4(0)
Ruka Norimatsu	0(0)	-	-	-	-	O	-	-	O	-	-	-	-	-	-	-	-	-	-	-	2(0)	2(0)
Yuria Obara	0(0)	-	-	-	-	-	-	-	O	-	-	-	-	-	-	-	-	-	-	-	1(0)	1(0)
Shiho Kohata	0(0)	-	-	-	-	-	-	-	O	-	-	-	-	-	-	-	-	-	-	-	1(0)	1(0)
Ami Sugita	0(0)	-	-	-	-	-	-	-	O	-	-	-	-	-	-	-	-	-	-	-	1(0)	1(0)

== 2015 ==
=== Results ===
2015.03.04	Japan	1–2	Denmark	Portugal
	Ando (?)		? (?) ? (?)

2015.03.06	Japan	3–0	Portugal	Portugal
	Kawamura (?); Yokoyama (?); Sugasawa (?)

2015.03.09	Japan	1–3	France	Portugal
	Kawasumi (?)		? (?) ? (?) ? (?)

2015.03.11	Japan	2–0	Iceland	Portugal
	Miyama (?)

2015.05.24	Japan	1–0	New Zealand	Kagawa, Japan
	Sawa (?)			Stadium: Kagawa Marugame Stadium

2015.05.28	Japan	1–0	Italy	Nagano, Japan
	Ogimi (?)			Stadium: Minami Nagano Sports Park Stadium

2015.06.08	Japan	1–0	Switzerland	Canada
	Miyama (?)

2015.06.12	Japan	2–1	Cameroon	Canada
	Sameshima (?); Sugasawa (?)		? (?)

2015.06.16	Japan	1–0	Ecuador	Canada
	Ogimi (?)

2015.06.23	Japan	2–1	Netherlands	Canada
	Ariyoshi (?); Sakaguchi (?)		? (?)

2015.06.27	Japan	1–0	Australia	Canada
	Iwabuchi (?)

2015.07.01	Japan	2–1	England	Canada
	Miyama (?) (?)		? (?)

2015.07.05	Japan	2–5	United States	Canada
	Ogimi (?) (?)		? (?) ? (?) ? (?) ? (?) ? (?)

2015.08.01	Japan	2–4	North Korea	China
	Masuya (?); Sugita (?)		? (?) ? (?) ? (?) ? (?)

2015.08.04	Japan	1–2	South Korea	China
	Nakajima (?)		? (?) ? (?)

2015.08.08	Japan	2–0	China	China
	Yokoyama (?); Sugita (?)

2015.11.29	Japan	1–3	Netherlands	Netherlands
	Sakaguchi (?)		? (?) ? (?) ? (?)

=== Players statistics ===
Player	−2014	03.04	03.06	03.09	03.11	05.24	05.28	06.08	06.12	06.16	06.23	06.27	07.01	07.05	08.01	08.04	08.08	11.29	2015	Total
Homare Sawa	197(82)	-	-	-	-	O(1)	O	O	O	O	O	O	-	O	-	-	-	-	8(1)	205(83)
Aya Miyama	144(34)	O	-	O	O(2)	O	O	O(1)	O	O	O	O	O(1)	O	-	-	-	O	13(4)	157(38)
Shinobu Ono	125(39)	O	-	O	O	O	O	O	O	O	O	O	O	O	-	-	-	-	12(0)	137(39)
Kozue Ando	119(18)	O(1)	O	O	O	O	O	O	-	-	-	-	-	-	-	-	-	-	7(1)	126(19)
Yuki Ogimi	112(52)	O	-	O	O	O	O(1)	O	O	O(1)	O	O	O	O(1)	-	-	-	O	13(3)	125(55)
Azusa Iwashimizu	109(11)	O	-	-	O	O	O	O	O	-	O	O	O	O	-	-	-	-	10(0)	119(11)
Yukari Kinga	92(5)	O	-	O	-	O	O	-	O	-	-	-	-	-	-	-	-	-	5(0)	97(5)
Mizuho Sakaguchi	85(26)	O	O	O	O	-	O	O	O	-	O(1)	O	O	O	-	-	-	O(1)	12(2)	97(28)
Miho Fukumoto	75(0)	-	O	-	O	-	O	-	-	O	-	-	-	-	-	-	-	-	4(0)	79(0)
Rumi Utsugi	74(5)	O	O	O	O	O	O	O	O	-	O	O	O	O	-	-	-	O	13(0)	87(5)
Nahomi Kawasumi	67(18)	O	O	O(1)	-	O	O	O	O	-	O	O	O	O	-	-	-	-	11(1)	78(19)
Saki Kumagai	63(0)	O	-	O	-	O	O	O	O	-	O	O	O	O	-	-	-	O	11(0)	74(0)
Aya Sameshima	57(3)	O	-	O	O	O	O	-	O(1)	O	O	O	O	O	-	-	-	O	12(1)	69(4)
Megumi Takase	52(9)	O	O	O	O	-	-	-	-	-	-	-	-	-	O	-	O	-	6(0)	58(9)
Ayumi Kaihori	46(0)	-	-	O	-	-	O	-	O	-	O	O	O	O	-	-	-	-	7(0)	53(0)
Asuna Tanaka	30(3)	-	O	O	O	-	-	-	-	O	-	-	-	-	-	O	O	-	6(0)	36(3)
Saori Ariyoshi	30(0)	O	O	O	O	-	O	O	-	O	O(1)	O	O	O	-	-	-	O	12(1)	42(1)
Megumi Kamionobe	27(2)	-	O	-	O	-	-	-	O	O	-	-	-	-	O	-	-	-	5(0)	32(2)
Mana Iwabuchi	25(3)	-	-	-	-	-	-	-	-	O	O	O(1)	O	O	-	-	-	-	5(1)	30(4)
Yuika Sugasawa	24(8)	O	O(1)	O	O	O	O	O	O(1)	O	-	-	-	O	O	O	O	O	14(2)	38(10)
Emi Nakajima	21(5)	-	-	-	-	-	-	-	-	-	-	-	-	-	-	O(1)	O	O	3(1)	24(6)
Kana Osafune	14(2)	-	-	-	-	-	-	-	-	-	-	-	-	-	-	-	-	O	1(0)	15(2)
Erina Yamane	13(0)	O	-	-	-	O	-	O	-	-	-	-	-	-	O	-	-	O	5(0)	18(0)
Yuri Kawamura	11(1)	-	O(1)	O	-	O	O	O	-	O	-	-	-	-	O	O	O	O	10(1)	21(2)
Rika Masuya	7(2)	-	-	-	-	-	-	-	-	-	-	-	-	-	O(1)	-	O	O	3(1)	10(3)
Asano Nagasato	7(1)	O	O	-	O	-	-	-	-	O	-	-	-	-	-	-	-	-	4(0)	11(1)
Kana Kitahara	7(0)	-	-	-	-	-	-	-	-	O	-	-	-	-	O	-	-	-	2(0)	9(0)
Hikaru Naomoto	6(0)	-	-	-	-	-	-	-	-	-	-	-	-	-	O	O	-	-	2(0)	8(0)
Mina Tanaka	4(1)	-	-	-	-	-	-	-	-	-	-	-	-	-	-	O	O	-	2(0)	6(1)
Mai Kyokawa	2(0)	-	-	-	-	-	-	-	-	-	-	-	-	-	O	O	O	-	3(0)	5(0)
Saori Arimachi	1(0)	-	-	-	-	-	-	-	-	-	-	-	-	-	O	O	O	O	4(0)	5(0)
Ami Sugita	1(0)	-	-	-	-	-	-	-	-	-	-	-	-	-	O(1)	-	O(1)	O	3(2)	4(2)
Yumi Uetsuji	1(0)	-	O	-	O	-	-	-	-	-	-	-	-	-	-	O	-	-	3(0)	4(0)
Ryoko Takara	1(0)	-	-	-	-	-	-	-	-	-	-	-	-	-	O	-	O	-	2(0)	3(0)
Shiho Kohata	1(0)	-	-	-	-	-	-	-	-	-	-	-	-	-	O	-	-	-	1(0)	2(0)
Rie Azami	1(0)	-	-	-	-	-	-	-	-	-	-	-	-	-	-	O	-	-	1(0)	2(0)
Kumi Yokoyama	0(0)	-	O(1)	-	-	-	-	-	-	-	-	-	-	-	O	O	O(1)	O	5(2)	5(2)
Ayaka Yamashita	0(0)	-	-	-	-	-	-	-	-	-	-	-	-	-	-	O	O	O	3(0)	3(0)
Tomoko Muramatsu	0(0)	-	-	-	-	-	-	-	-	-	-	-	-	-	-	O	O	-	2(0)	2(0)
Hanae Shibata	0(0)	-	-	-	-	-	-	-	-	-	-	-	-	-	-	O	-	-	1(0)	1(0)

== 2016 ==
=== Results ===
2016.02.29	Japan	1–3	Australia	Osaka, Japan
	Ogimi (?)		? (?) ? (?) ? (?)	Stadium: Nagai Football Stadium

2016.03.02	Japan	1–1	South Korea	Osaka, Japan
	Iwabuchi (?)		? (?)	Stadium: Nagai Football Stadium

2016.03.04	Japan	1–2	China	Osaka, Japan
	Yokoyama (?)		? (?) ? (?)	Stadium: Nagai Football Stadium

2016.03.07	Japan	6–1	Vietnam	Osaka, Japan
	Iwabuchi (?); Ono (?); Kawasumi (?); Nakajima (?); Yokoyama (?); Ogimi (?)		? (?)	Stadium: Nagai Football Stadium

2016.03.09	Japan	1–0	North Korea	Osaka, Japan
	Iwabuchi (?)			Stadium: Nagai Football Stadium

2016.06.02	Japan	3–3	United States	United States
	Iwabuchi (?); Ogimi (?); Yokoyama (?)		? (?) ? (?) ? (?)

2016.06.05	Japan	0–2	United States	United States
			? (?) ? (?)

2016.07.21	Japan	0–3	Sweden	Sweden
			? (?) ? (?) ? (?)

=== Players statistics ===
Player	−2015	02.29	03.02	03.04	03.07	03.09	06.02	06.05	07.21	2016	Total
Aya Miyama	157(38)	O	O	O	O	O	-	-	-	5(0)	162(38)
Shinobu Ono	137(39)	O	-	-	O(1)	-	-	-	-	2(1)	139(40)
Yuki Nagasato	125(55)	O(1)	O	O	O(1)	O	O(1)	-	O	7(3)	132(58)
Azusa Iwashimizu	119(11)	O	-	-	O	O	-	-	-	3(0)	122(11)
Mizuho Sakaguchi	97(28)	O	-	O	-	O	O	O	O	6(0)	103(28)
Yukari Kinga	97(5)	-	O	O	-	O	-	-	-	3(0)	100(5)
Rumi Utsugi	87(5)	-	-	-	-	-	O	O	O	3(0)	90(5)
Miho Fukumoto	79(0)	-	O	O	-	-	-	-	-	2(0)	81(0)
Nahomi Kawasumi	78(19)	O	O	O	O(1)	-	-	-	-	4(1)	82(20)
Saki Kumagai	74(0)	O	O	O	-	O	O	O	O	7(0)	81(0)
Aya Sameshima	69(4)	O	-	O	-	O	-	-	-	3(0)	72(4)
Megumi Takase	58(9)	-	-	O	O	O	-	-	-	3(0)	61(9)
Saori Ariyoshi	42(1)	O	O	-	O	O	O	O	O	7(0)	49(1)
Yuika Sugasawa	38(10)	-	-	-	-	-	-	O	-	1(0)	39(10)
Asuna Tanaka	36(3)	-	O	O	O	-	-	-	-	3(0)	39(3)
Megumi Kamionobe	32(2)	-	O	-	O	-	-	-	-	2(0)	34(2)
Mana Iwabuchi	30(4)	O	O(1)	O	O(1)	O(1)	O(1)	O	-	7(4)	37(8)
Emi Nakajima	24(6)	O	O	O	O(1)	O	O	O	-	7(1)	31(7)
Yuri Kawamura	21(2)	O	O	O	O	O	O	O	O	8(0)	29(2)
Erina Yamane	18(0)	O	-	-	-	O	-	O	-	3(0)	21(0)
Rika Masuya	10(3)	-	-	-	-	-	O	O	O	3(0)	13(3)
Kumi Yokoyama	5(2)	O	O	O(1)	O(1)	O	O(1)	O	O	8(3)	13(5)
Saori Arimachi	5(0)	-	-	-	-	-	-	-	O	1(0)	6(0)
Ami Sugita	4(2)	-	-	-	-	-	-	O	-	1(0)	5(2)
Ayaka Yamashita	3(0)	-	-	-	O	-	O	-	O	3(0)	6(0)
Tomoko Muramatsu	2(0)	-	-	-	-	-	O	-	O	2(0)	4(0)
Mayu Sasaki	0(0)	-	-	-	-	-	O	O	O	3(0)	3(0)
Sonoko Chiba	0(0)	-	-	-	-	-	O	O	O	3(0)	3(0)
Yu Nakasato	0(0)	-	-	-	-	-	O	O	O	3(0)	3(0)
Hikari Takagi	0(0)	-	-	-	-	-	-	O	-	1(0)	1(0)

== 2017 ==
=== Results ===
1 March 2017 Algarve Cup – GS	Japan	1–2	Spain	Parchal, Portugal
14:45 WET	Yokoyama 81'	Box; Report	Meseguer 56'; García 70'	Stadium: Bela Vista Municipal Stadium

3 March 2017 Algarve Cup – GS	Japan	2–0	Iceland	Parchal, Portugal
14:45 WET	Hasegawa 11', 15'	Box; Report		Stadium: Bela Vista Municipal Stadium

6 March 2017 Algarve Cup – GS	Japan	2–0	Norway	Algarve, Portugal
14:45 WET	Yokoyama 59', 89'	Box; Report		Stadium: Estádio Algarve

8 March 2017 Algarve Cup – 5th Place	Japan	2–3	Netherlands	Algarve, Portugal
14:45 WET	Yokoyama 20' van den Bulk 77' (o.g.)	Box; Report	Dekker 13'; Martens 19'; Miedema 90+3'	Stadium: Estádio Algarve

9 April 2017 Kirin Challenge Cup	Japan	3–0	Costa Rica	Kumamoto
19:00 JST	Yokoyama 23'; Tanaka 74'; Momiki 82'	Box; Report		Stadium: Umakana Yokana Stadium

9 June 2017 Friendly	Netherlands	0–1	Japan	Breda, Netherlands
18:30 CEST		Report	Yokoyama 62'; Sameshima (yellow card) 81'	Stadium: Rat Verlegh Stadion

13 June 2017 Friendly	Belgium	1–1	Japan	Leuven, Belgium
20:00 CEST	Van Gorp 72'	Report	Sugasawa 69'	Stadium: Stadion Den Dreef

27 July 2017 Tournament of Nations	Japan	1–1	Brazil	Seattle, United States
16:15 PT	Momiki 63'	Report	Camila 87'	Stadium: CenturyLink Field

30 July 2017 Tournament of Nations	Japan	2–4	Australia	San Diego, United States
14:15 PT	Tanaka 6'; Momiki 90+2'	Report	Kerr 11', 16', 43' van Egmond 62'	Stadium: Qualcomm Stadium

3 August 2017 Tournament of Nations	United States	3–0	Japan	Carson, United States
19:00 PT	Rapinoe 12'; Pugh 60'; Morgan 80'	Report		Stadium: StubHub Center

22 October 2017 MS&AD Cup	Japan	2–0	Switzerland	Nagano
16:30 JST	Nakajima 69'; Tanaka 90+3'	Report		Stadium: Nagano U Stadium

24 November 2017 Friendly	Jordan	0–2	Japan	Amman, Jordan
16:00 EET		Report	Iwabuchi 27', 30'	Stadium: King Abdullah II Stadium

8 December 2017 E-1 Championship	Japan	3–2	South Korea	Chiba
18:55 JST	Tanaka 8'; Nakajima 71'; Iwabuchi 83'	Report	Cho 14' (pen.); Han 80'	Stadium: Soga Sports Park; Attendance: 3,080; Referee: Katherine Margaret Jacewicz

11 December 2017 E-1 Championship	Japan	1–0	China	Chiba
18:55 JST	Tanaka 20'	Report	Wang (yellow card) 90+3'	Stadium: Soga Sports Park; Attendance: 3,163; Referee: Cong Thi Dung

15 December 2017 E-1 Championship	Japan	0–2	North Korea	Chiba
18:55 JST		Report	Kim 65'; Ri 82'	Stadium: Soga Sports Park; Attendance: 5,227

=== Players statistics ===
Player	−2016	03.01	03.03	03.06	03.08	04.09	06.09	06.13	07.27	07.30	08.03	10.22	11.24	12.08	12.11	12.15	2017	Total
Mizuho Sakaguchi	103(28)	O	-	O	O	O	O	O	O	-	O	O	O	O	O	O	13(0)	116(28)
Rumi Utsugi	90(5)	O	O	O	O	O	-	-	O	O	O	O	O	O	O	O	13(0)	103(5)
Saki Kumagai	81(0)	O	O	O	O	O	O	O	-	-	-	O	O	-	-	-	9(0)	90(0)
Aya Sameshima	72(4)	O	O	O	O	-	O	O	O	-	O	O	O	O	O	O	13(0)	85(4)
Yuika Sugasawa	39(10)	-	-	-	-	-	O	O(1)	O	-	-	-	-	-	-	O	4(1)	43(11)
Mana Iwabuchi	37(8)	-	O	-	-	-	-	-	-	-	-	O	O(2)	O(1)	O	O	6(3)	43(11)
Emi Nakajima	31(7)	O	O	O	O	O	O	O	O	O	O	O(1)	O	O(1)	O	O	15(2)	46(9)
Yuri Kawamura	29(2)	-	O	O	O	-	-	-	-	-	-	-	-	-	-	-	3(0)	32(2)
Erina Yamane	21(0)	O	-	-	-	-	-	O	-	-	-	-	-	-	-	-	2(0)	23(0)
Kumi Yokoyama	13(5)	O(1)	O	O(2)	O(1)	O(1)	O(1)	O	O	O	O	O	-	-	-	-	11(6)	24(11)
Rika Masuya	13(3)	O	-	-	O	-	-	-	-	-	-	-	-	-	-	-	2(0)	15(3)
Hikaru Naomoto	8(0)	-	-	-	-	O	O	O	O	O	-	-	O	-	O	-	7(0)	15(0)
Mina Tanaka	6(1)	O	O	O	O	O(1)	O	O	O	O(1)	O	O(1)	-	O(1)	O(1)	O	14(5)	20(6)
Ayaka Yamashita	6(0)	-	O	-	O	-	O	-	O	-	O	-	-	-	-	-	5(0)	11(0)
Ami Sugita	5(2)	-	-	-	-	-	-	O	-	-	-	-	-	-	-	-	1(0)	6(2)
Yu Nakasato	3(0)	O	O	O	O	O	O	O	-	O	O	O	O	-	O	O	13(0)	16(0)
Mayu Sasaki	3(0)	O	-	O	O	O	-	O	-	-	-	-	-	-	-	-	5(0)	8(0)
Sonoko Chiba	3(0)	-	O	O	-	-	-	-	-	-	-	-	-	-	-	-	2(0)	5(0)
Hikari Takagi	1(0)	O	O	O	O	O	O	O	O	O	-	-	O	O	-	O	12(0)	13(0)
Shiori Miyake	1(0)	-	-	-	-	-	-	-	-	-	-	O	O	O	O	O	5(0)	6(0)
Yuka Momiki	0(0)	O	O	O	O	O(1)	O	O	O(1)	O(1)	O	O	-	O	O	O	14(3)	14(3)
Yui Hasegawa	0(0)	O	O(2)	O	O	O	O	O	O	O	O	O	O	O	-	-	13(2)	13(2)
Sakiko Ikeda	0(0)	-	-	O	-	O	-	-	-	O	-	O	O	O	O	O	8(0)	8(0)
Ayumi Oya	0(0)	-	-	-	-	O	O	O	O	O	-	-	O	O	O	-	8(0)	8(0)
Rin Sumida	0(0)	-	-	-	-	O	O	-	-	O	O	-	O	-	O	O	7(0)	7(0)
Miho Manya	0(0)	-	-	-	-	-	-	-	O	O	O	O	O	O	O	-	7(0)	7(0)
Nana Ichise	0(0)	-	-	-	-	O	O	O	O	O	O	-	-	-	-	-	6(0)	6(0)
Madoka Haji	0(0)	-	-	-	-	-	-	-	-	O	O	O	O	O	-	O	6(0)	6(0)
Hikaru Kitagawa	0(0)	O	O	-	-	-	-	-	O	O	O	-	-	-	-	-	5(0)	5(0)
Kaede Nakamura	0(0)	-	O	O	O	-	-	-	-	-	-	-	-	-	-	-	3(0)	3(0)
Mami Ueno	0(0)	-	-	-	-	O	-	-	-	-	-	O	O	-	-	-	3(0)	3(0)
Shiho Tomari	0(0)	-	-	-	-	-	-	-	O	-	O	-	-	-	-	-	2(0)	2(0)
Riho Sakamoto	0(0)	-	-	-	-	-	-	-	-	O	-	-	-	-	-	-	1(0)	1(0)

== 2018 ==
=== Results ===
28 February 2018 Algarve Cup – GS	Japan	2–6	Netherlands	Parchal, Portugal
15:40 WET	Nakajima 38'; Iwabuchi 82'	Report	Martens 4', 52'; Beerensteyn 8'; Worm 31' van de Sanden 35' van der Gragt 44'	Stadium: Bela Vista Municipal Stadium

2 March 2018 Algarve Cup – GS	Japan	2–1	Iceland	Parchal, Portugal
15:25 WET	Sugasawa 15'; Utsugi 85'	Report	Glódís Perla 74'	Stadium: Bela Vista Municipal Stadium

5 March 2018 Algarve Cup – GS	Japan	2–0	Denmark	Almancil, Portugal
15:40 WET	Hasegawa 83'; Iwabuchi 90+3'	Report		Stadium: Estádio Algarve

7 March 2018 Algarve Cup – 5th/6th	Japan	0–2	Canada	Parchal, Portugal
14:55 WET		Report	Beckie 20'; Lawrence 50'	Stadium: Bela Vista Municipal Stadium

1 April 2018 MS&AD Cup	Japan	7–1	Ghana	Isahaya
13:30	Tanaka 14'; Iwabuchi 29'; Masuya 43'; Nakajima 48'; Takagi 74'; Sugasawa 79'; Sameshima 83'	Report	Ayieyam 24'	Stadium: Transcosmos Stadium Nagasaki

7 April 2018 Asian Cup – GS	Japan	4–0	Vietnam	Amman, Jordan
16:45 EEST	Yokoyama 3'; Nakajima 17'; Iwabuchi 53'; Tanaka 66'	Report		Stadium: King Abdullah II Stadium

10 April 2018 Asian Cup – GS	Japan	0–0	South Korea	Amman, Jordan
16:45 EEST		Report		Stadium: Amman International Stadium

13 April 2018 Asian Cup – GS	Japan	1–1	Australia	Amman, Jordan
16:45 EEST	Sakaguchi 63'	Report	Kerr 86'	Stadium: Amman International Stadium

17 April 2018 Asian Cup – SF	Japan	3–1	China	Amman, Jordan
20:00 EEST	Iwabuchi 39'; Yokoyama 85', 88'	Report	Wang (yellow card) 87'; Li 90'	Stadium: King Abdullah II Stadium

20 April 2018 Asian Cup – F	Japan	1–0	Australia	Amman, Jordan
20:00 EEST	Kumagai (yellow card) 14'; Yokoyama 84'	Report	Kellond-Knight (yellow card) 80'	Stadium: Amman International Stadium

10 June 2018 Friendly	New Zealand	1–3	Japan	Wellington, New Zealand
15:10 NZST	Moore 18'	Report	Tanaka 17', 34', 44'; Takagi (yellow card) 23'	Stadium: Westpac Stadium

26 July 2018 Tournament of Nations	United States	4–2	Japan	Kansas City, United States
18:00 CDT	Morgan 18', 26', 56'; Rapinoe 66'	Report	Tanaka 20'; Sakaguchi 76'	Stadium: Children's Mercy Park

29 July 2018 Tournament of Nations	Japan	1–2	Brazil	East Hartford, United States
16:15 EDT	Masuya 90+3'	Report	Marta 75'; Beatriz 90'	Stadium: Pratt & Whitney Stadium; Attendance: 13,027

2 August 2018 Tournament of Nations	Japan	0–2	Australia	Bridgeview, United States
16:45 CDT		Report	Kennedy 47'; Kerr 81'	Stadium: Toyota Park

16 August 2018 Asian Games – GS	Japan	2–0	Thailand	Palembang, Indonesia
18:30 IWST	Iwabuchi 33'; Momiki 85'	Report		Stadium: Bumi Sriwijaya Stadium

21 August 2018 Asian Games – GS	Japan	7–0	Vietnam	Palembang, Indonesia
15:00 IWST	Sugasawa 5', 77'; Momiki 17'; Nakajima 38'; Tanaka 52', 88'; Masuya 64'	Report		Stadium: Gelora Sriwijaya Stadium

25 August 2018 Asian Games – QF	Japan	2–1	North Korea	Palembang, Indonesia
16:00 IWST	Sakaguchi (yellow card) 36'; Iwabuchi 40'; Hasegawa 62'	Report	N. Kim 71' (pen.)	Stadium: Gelora Sriwijaya Stadium

28 August 2018 Asian Games – SF	Japan	2–1	South Korea	Palembang, Indonesia
16:00 IWST	Sugasawa 5'; Yamashita (yellow card) 42'; Lim 86' (o.g.)	Report	M. Lee 68'	Stadium: Gelora Sriwijaya Stadium

31 August 2018 Asian Games – F	Japan	1–0	China	Palembang, Indonesia
19:30 IWST	Sugasawa 90'	Report	Han (yellow card) 87'	Stadium: Gelora Sriwijaya Stadium

11 November 2018 Friendly	Japan	4–1	Norway	Tottori
14:00	Yokoyama 16'; Iwabuchi 27', 55'; Momiki 63'	Report	Gausdal 81'	Stadium: Tottori Bank Bird Stadium; Attendance: 6,185; Referee: Hong Yu

=== Players statistics ===
Player	−2017	02.28	03.02	03.05	03.07	04.01	04.07	04.10	04.13	04.17	04.20	06.10	07.26	07.29	08.02	08.16	08.21	08.25	08.28	08.31	11.11	2018	Total
Mizuho Sakaguchi	116(28)	O	-	O	O	O	O	O	O(1)	-	O	-	-	-	-	-	-	-	-	-	-	8(1)	124(29)
Rumi Utsugi	103(5)	-	O(1)	O	O	-	-	-	O	O	O	O	-	-	-	-	-	-	-	-	O	8(1)	111(6)
Saki Kumagai	90(0)	-	O	O	O	-	O	O	O	O	O	O	-	-	-	-	-	-	-	-	O	10(0)	100(0)
Aya Sameshima	85(4)	O	-	O	O	O(1)	O	O	O	-	O	O	O	O	O	O	O	O	O	O	O	18(1)	103(5)
Nahomi Kawasumi	82(20)	-	-	-	-	O	O	O	-	O	-	O	O	O	O	-	-	-	-	-	-	8(0)	90(20)
Saori Ariyoshi	49(1)	O	-	O	O	O	O	-	-	O	-	O	O	-	O	O	-	O	O	O	O	14(0)	63(1)
Emi Nakajima	46(9)	O(1)	O	O	O	O(1)	O(1)	-	O	O	O	O	O	O	O	O	O(1)	O	O	O	O	19(4)	65(13)
Mana Iwabuchi	43(11)	O(1)	O	O(1)	O	O(1)	O(1)	O	O	O(1)	O	-	O	O	O	O(1)	-	O(1)	O	O	O(2)	18(9)	61(20)
Yuika Sugasawa	43(11)	-	O(1)	-	O	O(1)	O	O	O	-	O	O	O	O	O	O	O(2)	O	O(1)	O(1)	O	17(6)	60(17)
Kumi Yokoyama	24(11)	O	O	O	-	-	O(1)	O	-	O(2)	O(1)	-	O	O	O	-	-	-	-	-	O(1)	11(5)	35(16)
Mina Tanaka	20(6)	O	O	O	O	O(1)	O(1)	O	-	O	-	O(3)	O(1)	O	O	O	O(2)	O	-	-	-	15(8)	35(14)
Yu Nakasato	16(0)	-	-	-	-	O	-	-	-	-	-	O	-	-	-	-	O	-	O	-	-	4(0)	20(0)
Rika Masuya	15(3)	O	O	O	-	O(1)	O	-	O	O	-	-	O	O(1)	O	-	O(1)	O	-	-	-	12(3)	27(6)
Hikaru Naomoto	15(0)	-	O	-	-	O	O	-	-	-	-	-	-	-	-	-	-	-	-	-	-	3(0)	18(0)
Yuka Momiki	14(3)	-	-	-	-	-	-	-	-	-	-	-	-	O	-	O(1)	O(1)	O	O	O	O(1)	7(3)	21(6)
Yui Hasegawa	13(2)	O	O	O(1)	O	-	-	O	O	O	O	O	O	O	O	O	-	O(1)	O	O	O	17(2)	30(4)
Hikari Takagi	13(0)	O	O	-	O	O(1)	-	-	-	-	-	O	-	-	-	-	O	-	-	-	-	6(1)	19(1)
Ayaka Yamashita	11(0)	-	O	-	O	O	O	O	O	-	O	O	O	-	-	-	O	O	O	O	O	14(0)	25(0)
Sakiko Ikeda	8(0)	O	-	O	-	O	-	-	-	O	-	-	-	O	-	O	-	-	-	-	-	6(0)	14(0)
Ayumi Oya	8(0)	-	O	-	-	-	-	-	-	-	-	-	-	-	-	-	-	-	-	-	-	1(0)	9(0)
Rin Sumida	7(0)	O	O	-	O	O	-	O	-	O	-	O	O	O	O	O	O	O	O	O	-	15(0)	22(0)
Shiori Miyake	6(0)	O	-	O	-	-	-	-	-	O	-	O	O	-	O	O	O	O	O	O	-	11(0)	17(0)
Nana Ichise	6(0)	O	-	O	O	O	O	O	O	-	O	-	-	-	-	-	-	-	-	-	O	9(0)	15(0)
Madoka Haji	6(0)	O	-	-	-	-	-	-	-	-	-	-	-	-	-	-	-	-	-	-	-	1(0)	7(0)
Risa Shimizu	0(0)	O	O	O	O	O	-	O	O	O	O	O	O	O	O	O	O	O	O	O	O	19(0)	19(0)
Moeno Sakaguchi	0(0)	-	-	-	-	-	-	-	-	-	-	O	O(1)	O	O	O	O	O	O	O	O	10(1)	10(1)
Narumi Miura	0(0)	-	-	-	-	-	-	-	-	-	-	O	O	O	O	-	-	-	-	-	O	5(0)	5(0)
Aimi Kunitake	0(0)	-	-	-	-	-	-	-	-	-	-	-	-	O	-	-	O	-	O	-	-	3(0)	3(0)
Mayo Doko	0(0)	-	-	-	-	-	-	-	-	-	-	-	-	O	-	-	-	-	-	-	-	1(0)	1(0)
Chika Hirao	0(0)	-	-	-	-	-	-	-	-	-	-	-	-	-	O	-	-	-	-	-	-	1(0)	1(0)
Hina Sugita	0(0)	-	-	-	-	-	-	-	-	-	-	-	-	-	O	-	-	-	-	-	-	1(0)	1(0)
Fuka Nagano	0(0)	-	-	-	-	-	-	-	-	-	-	-	-	-	-	-	-	-	-	-	O	1(0)	1(0)
Hinata Miyazawa	0(0)	-	-	-	-	-	-	-	-	-	-	-	-	-	-	-	-	-	-	-	O	1(0)	1(0)

== 2019 ==
28 February 2019 SheBelieves Cup	United States	2–2	Japan	Chester, United States
9:05	Rapinoe 23'; Morgan 76'	Report	Nakajima 67'; Momiki 90+1'	Stadium: Talen Energy Stadium; Attendance: 14,555; Referee: Melissa Borjas (Honduras)

3 March 2019 SheBelieves Cup	Brazil	1–3	Japan	Nashville, United States
4:00	Debinha 57'	Report	Momiki 44'; Kobayashi 81'; Hasegawa 85'	Stadium: Nissan Stadium; Attendance: 12,586; Referee: Karen Abt (United States)

6 March 2019 SheBelieves Cup	Japan	0–3	England	Tampa, United States
7:25		Report	Staniforth 12'; Carney 23'; Mead 30'	Stadium: Raymond James Stadium; Attendance: 8,580; Referee: Christina Unkel (United States)

4 April 2019 Friendly	France	3–1	Japan	Auxerre, France
21:00 CEST	Gauvin 3'; Le Sommer 33'; Diani 82'	Report	Kobayashi 24'	Stadium: Stade de l'Abbé-Deschamps; Attendance: 15,379; Referee: Sara Persson (Sweden)

9 April 2019 Friendly	Germany	2–2	Japan	Paderborn, Germany
16:00 CEST	Popp 53'; Huth 72'	Report	Hasegawa 35'; Yokoyama 69'	Stadium: Benteler-Arena; Attendance: 4,804; Referee: Esther Staubli (Switzerland)

2 June 2019 Friendly	Japan	1–1	Spain	Le Touquet, France
20:50 CEST	Sugasawa 86'	Report	Hermoso 22' (pen.)	Stadium: Stade Gérard Houllier; Attendance: 634; Referee: Mehdi Mokhtari (France)

10 June 2019 FIFA Women's World Cup - GS	Argentina	0–0	Japan	Paris, France
18:00 CEST		Report		Stadium: Parc des Princes; Attendance: 25,055; Referee: Stéphanie Frappart (France)

14 June 2019 FIFA Women's World Cup - GS	Japan	2–1	Scotland	Rennes, France
15:00 CEST	Iwabuchi 23'; Sugasawa 37' (pen.)	Report	Clelland 88'	Stadium: Roazhon Park; Attendance: 13,201; Referee: Lidya Tafesse Abebe (Ethiopia)

19 June 2019 FIFA Women's World Cup - GS	Japan	0–2	England	Nice, France
21:00 CEST		Report	White 14', 84'	Stadium: Allianz Riviera; Attendance: 14,319; Referee: Claudia Umpiérrez (Uruguay)

25 June 2019 FIFA Women's World Cup - R16	Netherlands	2–1	Japan	Rennes, France
21:00 CEST	Martens 17', 90' (pen.)	Report	Hasegawa 43'	Stadium: Roazhon Park; Attendance: 21,076; Referee: Melissa Borjas (Honduras)

6 October 2019 Friendly	Japan	4–0	Canada	Shizuoka
14:30	Iwabuchi 6'; Momiki 65'; Hasegawa 72'; Kobayashi 90+2'	Report	Zadorsky (yellow card) 77'	Stadium: IAI Stadium Nihondaira

10 November 2019 Friendly	Japan	2–0	South Africa	Kitakyushu
12:45	Kumagai (yellow card) 9'; Kumagai 20'; Sugasawa 41'	Report		Stadium: Kitakyushu Stadium

11 December 2019 EAFF Championship	Japan	9–0	Chinese Taipei	Busan, South Korea
16:20	Iwabuchi 7', 71'; Tanaka 9', 38' (pen.); Kobayashi 17'; Matsubara 44'; Ikejiri 54' (pen.), 90+2'; Seike 66'	Box; Report		Stadium: Busan Asiad Main Stadium

14 December 2019 EAFF Championship	Japan	3–0	China	Busan, South Korea
15:55	Iwabuchi 9', 44', 55'	Box	Wu (yellow card) 31'	Stadium: Busan Gudeok Stadium

17 December 2019 EAFF Championship	South Korea	0–1	Japan	Busan, South Korea
19:30	C. Jang (yellow card) 21'; Shim (yellow card) 87'	Box; Report	Tanaka (yellow card) 44'; Momiki 88' (pen.)	Stadium: Busan Gudeok Stadium
