= 2013 Nadeshiko League Cup final =

INAC Kobe Leonessa	Okayama Yunogo Belle
3	1
- Date: September 1, 2013
- Venue: Hiroshima Big Arch, Hiroshima

2013 Nadeshiko League Cup final was the 8th final of the Nadeshiko League Cup competition. The final was played at Hiroshima Big Arch in Hiroshima on September 1, 2013. INAC Kobe Leonessa won the championship.

== Overview ==
INAC Kobe Leonessa won their 1st title, by defeating Okayama Yunogo Belle 3–1 with Chiaki Minamiyama, Goebel Yanez and Nahomi Kawasumi goal.

== Match details ==
September 1, 2013

INAC Kobe Leonessa	3-1	Okayama Yunogo Belle
Chiaki Minamiyama 30'; Goebel Yanez 65'; Nahomi Kawasumi 90+3'	Report	Saori Arimachi 13'

Hiroshima Big Arch

== See also ==
- 2013 Nadeshiko League Cup
