= Miho Fukumoto =

Japanese footballer (born 1983)

Miho Fukumoto 福元 美穂
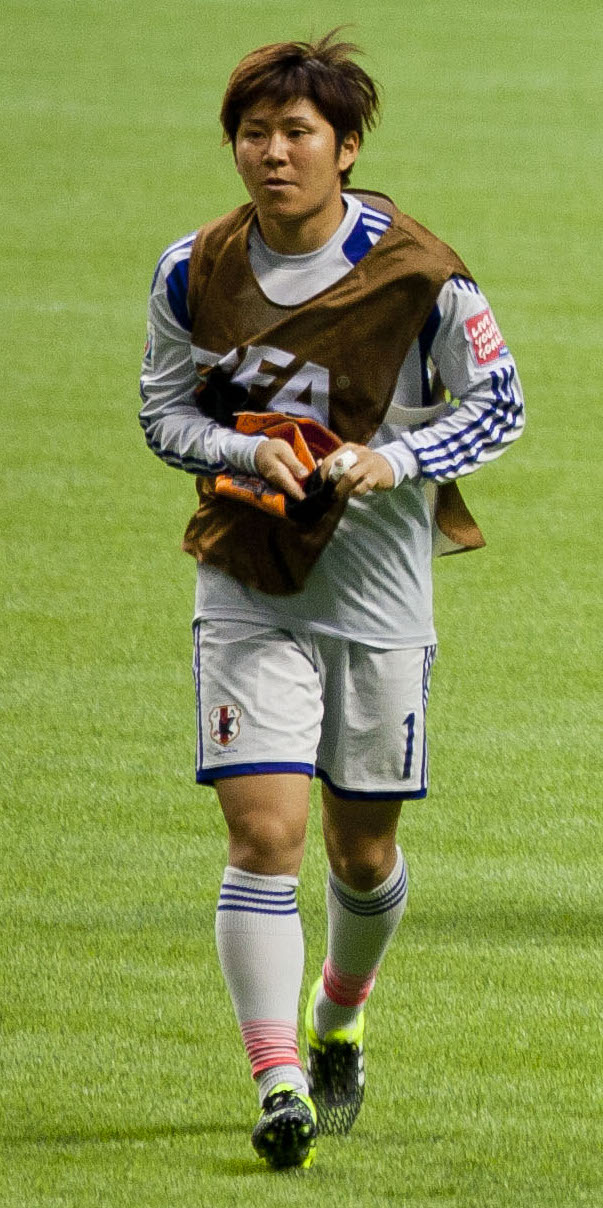
- Fukumoto at the 2015 World Cup

Personal information
- Full name: Miho Fukumoto
- Date of birth: October 2, 1983 (age 43)
- Place of birth: Ibusuki, Kagoshima, Japan
- Height: 1.65 m (5 ft 5 in)
- Position: Goalkeeper

Youth career
- Kamimura Gakuen High School

Senior career*
Years	Team	Apps	(Gls)
2001–2016	Okayama Yunogo Belle	259	(0)
2016–2018	INAC Kobe Leonessa	7	(0)
2019–2020	Chifure AS Elfen Saitama	0	(0)
2021–2025	Sanfrecce Hiroshima Regina	10	(0)
2025–2026	Okayama Yunogo Belle	0	(0)
Total		266	(0)

International career
2002	Japan U-20	4	(0)
2002–2016	Japan	81	(0)
Medal record
Okayama Yunogo Belle
Runner-up	Nadeshiko League Cup	2013
Runner-up	Empress's Cup	2006
INAC Kobe Leonessa
Runner-up	Nadeshiko League	2016
Runner-up	Nadeshiko League	2017
Runner-up	Nadeshiko League	2018
Runner-up	Nadeshiko League Cup	2018
Winner	Empress's Cup	2016
Runner-up	Empress's Cup	2018
Representing Japan
Olympic Games
Silver medal – second place	2012 London	Team
FIFA Women's World Cup
Gold medal – first place	2011 Germany
Silver medal – second place	2015 Canada
AFC Women's Asian Cup
Gold medal – first place	2014 Vietnam
Bronze medal – third place	2008 Vietnam
Bronze medal – third place	2010 China
Asian Games
Silver medal – second place	2006 Doha	Team
Bronze medal – third place	2002 Busan	Team
AFC U-19 Women's Championship
Gold medal – first place	2002 India
- * Club domestic league appearances and goals as of December 31, 2018

Miho Fukumoto (福元 美穂, Fukumoto Miho; born October 2, 1983) is a Japanese former football player who played as a goalkeeper. She plays for Okayama Yunogo Belle in the Nadeshiko League. As a player for the Japan national team, she was capped 81 times between 2002 and 2016.

== Club career ==
Fukumoto was born in Ibusuki on October 2, 1983. After graduating from high school, she joined for Okayama Yunogo Belle in 2001. She was selected Best Eleven 3 times (2006, 2012 and 2014). She played 259 matches at the club. In August 2016, she moved to INAC Kobe Leonessa. However she could hardly play in the match. In 2019, she moved to Chifure AS Elfen Saitama.

== National team career ==
In August 2002, Fukumoto was selected by the Japan U-20 national team for the 2002 U-19 World Championship. In October, she was selected by the Japan national team for the 2002 Asian Games. At this competition, on October 4, she debuted against Vietnam. She played in the World Cup 3 times (2007, 2011 and 2015) and at the Summer Olympics 2 times (2008 and 2012). Japan won the championship at the 2011 World Cup, came second in the 2015 World Cup and got a silver medal in the 2012 Summer Olympics. She played 81 games for Japan until 2016.

== National team statistics ==
Japan national team
Year	Apps	Goals
2002	1	0
2003	1	0
2004	0	0
2005	4	0
2006	13	0
2007	14	0
2008	14	0
2009	0	0
2010	4	0
2011	5	0
2012	11	0
2013	3	0
2014	5	0
2015	4	0
2016	2	0
Total	81	0
