= Manami Nakano =

Japanese footballer

Manami Nakano 中野 真奈美
Personal information
- Full name: Manami Nakano
- Date of birth: August 30, 1986 (age 40)
- Place of birth: Hokkaido, Japan
- Height: 1.59 m (5 ft 2 1/2 in)
- Position: Midfielder

Team information
- Current team: Nojima Stella
- Number: 24

Youth career
- 2002–2004: Hokkaido Bunkyo University Meisei High School

Senior career*
Years	Team	Apps	(Gls)
2005–2006	Ohara Gakuen JaSRA	37	(23)
2007–2014	Okayama Yunogo Belle	161	(51)
2015–2017	Mynavi Vegalta Sendai	47	(7)
2017–2019	AC Nagano Parceiro	26	(3)
2020-	Nojima Stella	0	(6)
Total		271	(84)

International career
2010–2013	Japan	12	(2)
Medal record
Okayama Yunogo Belle
Runner-up	Nadeshiko League Cup	2013
Mynavi Vegalta Sendai
Runner-up	Nadeshiko League	2015
Representing Japan
AFC Women's Asian Cup
Bronze medal – third place	2010 China
Asian Games
Gold medal – first place	2010 Guangzhou	Team
- * Club domestic league appearances and goals as of December 31, 2018

Manami Nakano (中野 真奈美, Nakano Manami; born August 30, 1986) is a Japanese footballer playing as a midfielder. She plays for Nojima Stella in the Nadeshiko League Division 1. She has also played for the Japan national team.

== Club career ==
Nakano was born in Hokkaido on August 30, 1986. After graduating from high school, she joined Ohara Gakuen JaSRA (later AC Nagano Parceiro) in 2005. In 2007, she moved to Okayama Yunogo Belle and she played in 8 season. In 2015, she moved to Vegalta Sendai (later Mynavi Vegalta Sendai). In July 2017, she returned to AC Nagano Parceiro.

== National team career ==
On January 13, 2010, Nakano debuted for Japan national team against Denmark. She was a member of Japan for 2010 Asian Games and Japan won the championship. She played 12 games and scored 2 goals for Japan until 2013.

== National team statistics ==
Japan national team
Year	Apps	Goals
2010	10	2
2011	0	0
2012	1	0
2013	1	0
Total	12	2

== International goals ==
No.	Date	Venue	Opponent	Score	Result	Competition
1.	22 May 2010	Chengdu Sports Centre, Chengdu, China	Thailand	2–0	4–0	2010 AFC Women's Asian Cup
