= Nanase Kiryu =

Japanese footballer

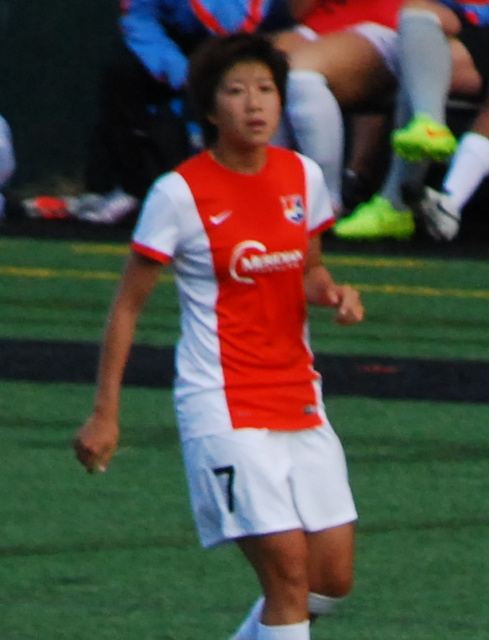

Personal information
- Full name: Nanase Kiryu
- Date of birth: 31 October 1989 (age 37)
- Place of birth: Kanagawa, Japan
- Height: 1.61 m (5 ft 3 1/2 in)
- Position: Forward

Team information
- Current team: Changnyeong
- Number: 14

Youth career
- 2007: Nippon TV Beleza

Senior career*
Years	Team	Apps	(Gls)
2007–2013	Nippon TV Beleza	94	(25)
2014	Sky Blue	16	(0)
2014–2015	Nippon TV Beleza	18	(2)
2016	Guangdong Haiyin	0	(0)
2017–?	Okayama Yunogo Belle	0	(0)
2020-	Changnyeong	0	(0)
Total		128	(27)

International career
2010–2014	Japan	16	(3)
Medal record
Nippon TV Beleza
Winner	Nadeshiko League	2007
Winner	Nadeshiko League	2008
Winner	Nadeshiko League	2010
Winner	Nadeshiko League	2015
Runner-up	Nadeshiko League	2009
Runner-up	Nadeshiko League	2011
Runner-up	Nadeshiko League	2012
Runner-up	Nadeshiko League	2013
Runner-up	Nadeshiko League	2014
Winner	Nadeshiko League Cup	2007
Winner	Nadeshiko League Cup	2010
Winner	Nadeshiko League Cup	2012
Winner	Empress's Cup	2007
Winner	Empress's Cup	2008
Winner	Empress's Cup	2009
Winner	Empress's Cup	2014
Representing Japan
AFC Women's Asian Cup
Gold medal – first place	2014 Vietnam
Asian Games
Silver medal – second place	2014 Incheon	Team
- * Club domestic league appearances and goals

Nanase Kiryu (木龍 七瀬, Kiryū Nanase; born 31 October 1989) is a Japanese footballer playing as a forward. She plays for Changnyeong WFC in the WK League. She has also played for the Japan national team.

== Club career ==
Kiryu was born in Kanagawa Prefecture on 31 October 1989. From 2007, she played for Nippon TV Beleza in Japan's first-division L.League. During her career with the team, she scored 25 goals in her 94 appearances. In February 2014, she signed with Sky Blue FC in the National Women's Soccer League, where she played for one season before returning to Beleza. In January 2016, Kiryu signed with Chinese Division 2 club Guangdong Haiyin, located in the Chinese city of Guangzhou. In 2017, she returned to Japan and joined Okayama Yunogo Belle.

== National team career ==
On 13 January 2010, Kiryu debuted for Japan national team against Denmark. She was a member of Japan for 2014 Asian Cup and Japan won the championship. She played 16 games and scored 3 goals for Japan until 2014.

== National team statistics ==
Japan national team
Year	Apps	Goals
2010	3	0
2011	0	0
2012	2	0
2013	1	0
2014	10	3
Total	16	3

== International goals ==
No.	Date	Venue	Opponent	Score	Result	Competition
1.	16 May 2014	Hồ Chí Minh City, Vietnam	Vietnam	2–0	4–0	2014 AFC Women's Asian Cup
2.	26 September 2014	Hwaseong, South Korea	Hong Kong	6–0	9–0	2014 Asian Games
3.	26 September 2014	Hwaseong, South Korea	Hong Kong	9–0	9–0	2014 Asian Games

== Honors and awards ==
Individual

- L.League Best XI: 2013

Club

- L.League Division 1 League Champions: 2008, 2010
- L.League Division 1 League Runners-up: 2009, 2011, 2012, 2013
- Empress's Cup: 2008, 2009
- Nadeshiko League Cup: 2007, 2010, 2012
- Japan/Korea Women's League Championship: 2011

Japan

- AFC Women's Asian Cup: 2014
