= Megumi Takase =

Japanese footballer (born 1990)

Megumi Takase 高瀬 愛実
Personal information
- Full name: Megumi Takase
- Date of birth: November 10, 1990 (age 36)
- Place of birth: Kitami, Hokkaido, Japan
- Height: 1.64 m (5 ft 4 1/2 in)
- Position: Forward

Team information
- Current team: INAC Kobe Leonessa
- Number: 11

Youth career
- 2006–2008: Hokkaido Bunkyo University Meisei High School

Senior career*
Years	Team	Apps	(Gls)
2009–	INAC Kobe Leonessa	238	(104)

International career^{‡}
2010–2016	Japan	61	(9)
Medal record
INAC Kobe Leonessa
Winner	Nadeshiko League	2011
Winner	Nadeshiko League	2012
Winner	Nadeshiko League	2013
Runner-up	Nadeshiko League	2016
Runner-up	Nadeshiko League	2017
Runner-up	Nadeshiko League	2018
Winner	Nadeshiko League Cup	2013
Runner-up	Nadeshiko League Cup	2012
Runner-up	Nadeshiko League Cup	2018
Winner	Empress's Cup	2010
Winner	Empress's Cup	2011
Winner	Empress's Cup	2012
Winner	Empress's Cup	2013
Winner	Empress's Cup	2015
Winner	Empress's Cup	2016
Runner-up	Empress's Cup	2018
Representing Japan
Olympic Games
Silver medal – second place	2012 London	Team
FIFA Women's World Cup
Gold medal – first place	2011 Germany
AFC Women's Asian Cup
Gold medal – first place	2014 Vietnam
Bronze medal – third place	2010 China
Asian Games
Gold medal – first place	2010 Guangzhou	Team
Silver medal – second place	2014 Incheon	Team
AFC U-19 Women's Championship
Gold medal – first place	2009 China
- * Club domestic league appearances and goals as of 19:05, 23 February 2023 (UTC) ‡ National team caps and goals as of 19:05, 23 February 2023 (UTC)

Megumi Takase (高瀬 愛実, Takase Megumi; born November 10, 1990) is a Japanese footballer who plays as a forward for INAC Kobe Leonessa in the WE League and the Japanese national team.

== Club career ==
Takase was born in Kitami on November 10, 1990. After graduating from high school, she joined INAC Kobe Leonessa in 2009. In 2009 season, she was selected Best Young Player awards. In 2012, she scored 20 goals in 18 games and became top scorer. she was also selected MVP awards.

== International career ==
On January 15, 2010, Takase debuted for the Japan national team against Chile. In July, she was selected to play for the Japan U-20 national team at the 2010 U-20 World Cup. She was a member of Japan's squad for the 2011 World Cup and the 2012 Summer Olympics. Japan won the 2011 World Cup and got a silver medal at the 2012 Summer Olympics. She was also a squad member for the 2010 Asian Games and the 2014 Asian Cup. Japan won the championship at both tournaments. She played 61 games and scored 9 goals for Japan until 2016.

== Personal life ==
Takase's brother Akira Takase is also a footballer.

== Career statistics ==
=== Club ===
As of match played 28 January 2023

Appearances and goals by club, season and competition
Club	Season	League			National Cup		League Cup		Total	
Club	Season	Division	Apps	Goals	Apps	Goals	Apps	Goals	Apps	Goals
INAC Kobe Leonessa	2009	Nadeshiko League	19	16	3	1	-		22	17
INAC Kobe Leonessa	2010	Nadeshiko League	18	8	4	3	3	1	25	12
INAC Kobe Leonessa	2011	Nadeshiko League	15	2	4	3	-		19	5
INAC Kobe Leonessa	2012	Nadeshiko League	18	20	4	1	6	2	28	23
INAC Kobe Leonessa	2013	Nadeshiko League	13	6	4	5	9	4	26	15
INAC Kobe Leonessa	2014	Nadeshiko League	28	19	2	1	-		30	20
INAC Kobe Leonessa	2015	Nadeshiko League	16	7	4	3	-		20	10
INAC Kobe Leonessa	2016	Nadeshiko League	18	3	5	1	8	4	31	8
INAC Kobe Leonessa	2017	Nadeshiko League	18	5	2	1	9	1	29	7
INAC Kobe Leonessa	2018	Nadeshiko League	18	6	5	2	9	2	32	10
INAC Kobe Leonessa	2019	Nadeshiko League	18	1	4	2	10	0	32	3
INAC Kobe Leonessa	2020	Nadeshiko League	14	3	3	2	-		17	5
INAC Kobe Leonessa	2021–22	WE League	19	4	1	0	-		20	4
INAC Kobe Leonessa	2022–23	WE League	6	4	4	1	4	0	14	5
Career total			238	104	49	26	58	14	345	145

=== International ===
As of match played 9 March 2016

Appearances and goals by national team and year
National team	Year	Apps	Goals
Japan	2010	12	4
Japan	2011	7	0
Japan	2012	10	1
Japan	2013	6	0
Japan	2014	17	4
Japan	2015	6	0
Japan	2016	3	0
Total		61	9

Scores and results list Japan's goal tally first, score column indicates score after each Takase goal.

List of international goals scored by Megumi Takase
No.	Date	Venue	Opponent	Score	Result	Competition
1	21 January 2010	Chile	Colombia	3–0	4–2	2010 BICENNTENIAL WOMAN'S CUP
2	11 February 2010	Olympic Stadium, Tokyo, Japan	Chinese Taipei	3–0	3–0	2010 EAFF Women's Football Championship
3	8 May 2010	Matsumoto, Japan	Mexico	2–0	4–0	Friendly
4	22 May 2010	Chengdu Sports Centre, Chengdu, China	Thailand	0–1	0–4	2010 AFC Women's Asian Cup
5	5 March 2012	Estádio Algarve, Faro, Portugal	United States	1–0	1–0	2012 Algarve Cup
6	8 May 2014	ND Soft Stadium Yamagata, Tendo, Japan	New Zealand	1–0	2–1	Friendly
7	13 September 2014	Yodoko Sakura Stadium, Osaka, Japan	Ghana	1–0	5–0	Friendly
8	13 September 2014	Yodoko Sakura Stadium, Osaka, Japan	Ghana	3–0	5–0	Friendly
9	26 September 2014	Hwaseong Stadium, Hwaseong, South Korea	Hong Kong	7–0	9–0	2014 Asian Games

== Honours ==
INAC Kobe Leonessa

- Nadeshiko League: 2011, 2012, 2013
- WE League: 2021–22
- Empress's Cup: 2010, 2011, 2012, 2013, 2015, 2016
- Nadeshiko League Cup: 2013

Japan

- FIFA Women's World Cup: 2011
- Asian Games: 2010
- East Asian Football Championship: 2010
- AFC Women's Asian Cup: 2014

Japan U20

- AFC U-19 Women's Championship: 2009
