= Mami Yamaguchi =

Japanese footballer (born 1986)

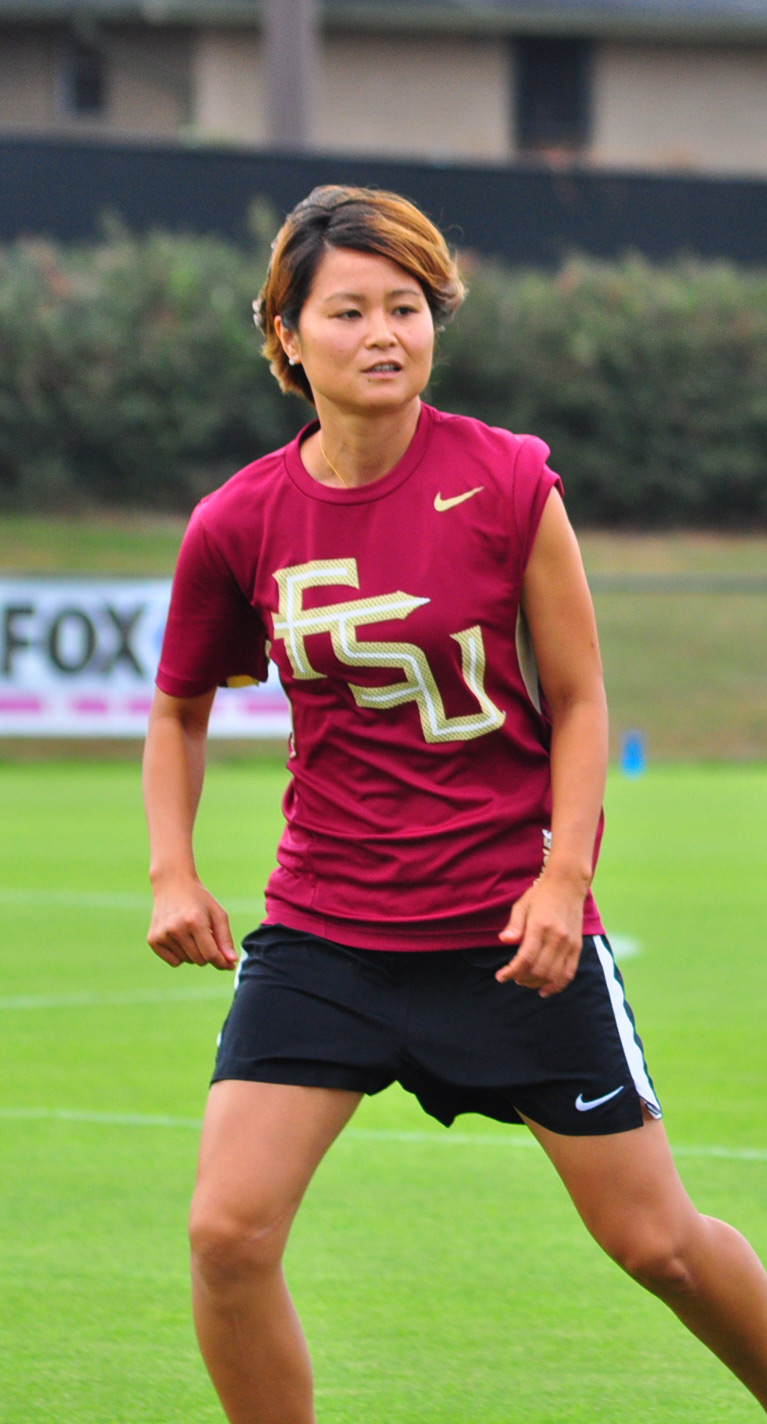

Personal information
- Full name: Mami Yamaguchi
- Date of birth: 13 August 1986 (age 40)
- Place of birth: Nishitokyo, Tokyo, Japan
- Height: 1.65 m (5 ft 5 in)
- Position: Forward

College career
Years	Team	Apps	(Gls)
2005–2007	Florida State Seminoles		

Senior career*
Years	Team	Apps	(Gls)
2002–2004	Nippon TV Beleza	25	(14)
2008–2009	Umeå	44	(7)
2010	Atlanta Beat	22	(1)
2010	Nippon TV Beleza	6	(3)
2011	Hammarby	12	(0)
2012–2013	Okayama Yunogo Belle	11	(1)
2014	Nippon TV Beleza	12	(1)
2019	AFC Ann Arbor	2	(1)
2021	Detroit City FC	6	(1)
Total		140	(29)

International career
2007–2011	Japan	18	(8)
Medal record
Representing Japan
AFC Women's Asian Cup
Bronze medal – third place	2010 China
Asian Games
Gold medal – first place	2010 Guangzhou	Team
- * Club domestic league appearances and goals

Mami Yamaguchi (山口 麻美, Yamaguchi Mami; born 13 August 1986) is a Japanese football coach and former player. She is currently an assistant coach with the NWSL's Washington Spirit. She played for the Japan national team and last played for Detroit City FC.

== Club career ==
Yamaguchi previously played for the Florida State Seminoles at the collegiate level, where she won the MAC Hermann Trophy in 2007. She became the first player in Florida State Soccer history to have her jersey retired. She played for Atlanta Beat (WPS) in the United States and Umeå IK, where she won the double, and made it to UEFA Champions Cup Final, and Hammarby in Sweden's Damallsvenskan.

She joined United Women's Soccer amateur club AFC Ann Arbor in 2019, scoring the team's first-ever goal.

== National team career ==
On 28 July 2007, Yamaguchi debuted for Japan national team against the United States. She played 18 games and scored 8 goals for Japan until 2011.

== Coaching career ==
Yamaguchi began coaching as a volunteer at Florida State during the 2015–16 season. In 2019, she took an assistant coach position with Livonia City F.C., a club now in the second division of United Women's Soccer. In 2021, she became a player-coach at Detroit City FC.

In April 2023, National Women's Soccer League club Washington Spirit hired Yamaguchi as an assistant coach, reuniting her with former Florida State head coach Mark Krikorian, who had become the Spirit's general manager.

== Club statistics ==
Club	Season	League		Cup		League Cup		Continental		Total	
Club	Season	Apps	Goals	Apps	Goals	Apps	Goals	Apps	Goals	Apps	Goals
Nippon TV Beleza	2003	18	9			-		-		18	9
Nippon TV Beleza	2004	7	5			-		-		7	5
Nippon TV Beleza	Total	25	14					-		25	14
Umeå IK	2008	22	3			1	1	8	0	32	4
Umeå IK	2009	22	4			1	0	4	0	27	4
Umeå IK	Total					-				59	8
Atlanta Beat	2010	22	1	-		-		-		22	1
Atlanta Beat	Total	22	1	-		-		-		22	1
Nippon TV Beleza	2010	6	3					-		6	3
Nippon TV Beleza	Total	6	1	2	2	-		-		8	3
Hammarby	2011	12	0	-		-		-		12	0
Hammarby	Total	12	0	-		-		-		5	0
Okayama Yunogo Belle	2012	8	1	2	3	0	0	-		10	4
Okayama Yunogo Belle	Total	8	1	2	3	0	0	-		10	4
Career total										129	30

== National team statistics ==
Japan national team
Year	Apps	Goals
2007	1	0
2008	0	0
2009	1	1
2010	14	5
2011	2	2
Total	18	8

International goals
#	Date	Venue	Opponent	Score	Result	Competition
1.	1 August 2009	Maurice Beraud Stadium, Montargis, France	France	0–4	0–4	Friendly Match
2.	13 January 2010	Estadio Municipal Francisco Sánchez Rumoroso, Coquimbo, Chile	Denmark	1–0	1–0	2010 Bicennteniall Woman's Cup (es)
3.	23 January 2010	Estadio Municipal Francisco Sánchez Rumoroso, Coquimbo, Chile	Argentina	0–3	0–3	2010 Bicennteniall Woman's Cup
4.	13 February 2010	Ajinomoto Stadium, Chōfu Japan	South Korea	2–0	2–1	2010 EAFF Women's Football Championship
5.	20 May 2010	Chengdu Sports Centre, Chengdu China	Myanmar	3–0	8–0	2010 AFC Women's Asian Cup
6.	20 May 2010	Chengdu Sports Centre, Chengdu China	Myanmar	6–0	8–0	2010 AFC Women's Asian Cup
7.	4 March 2011	Municipal Stadium, Lagos, Portugal	Finland	4–0	5–0	2011 Algarve Cup
8.	4 March 2011	Municipal Stadium, Lagos, Portugal	Finland	5–0	5–0	2011 Algarve Cup
