= Yuri Kawamura =

Japanese footballer (born 1989)

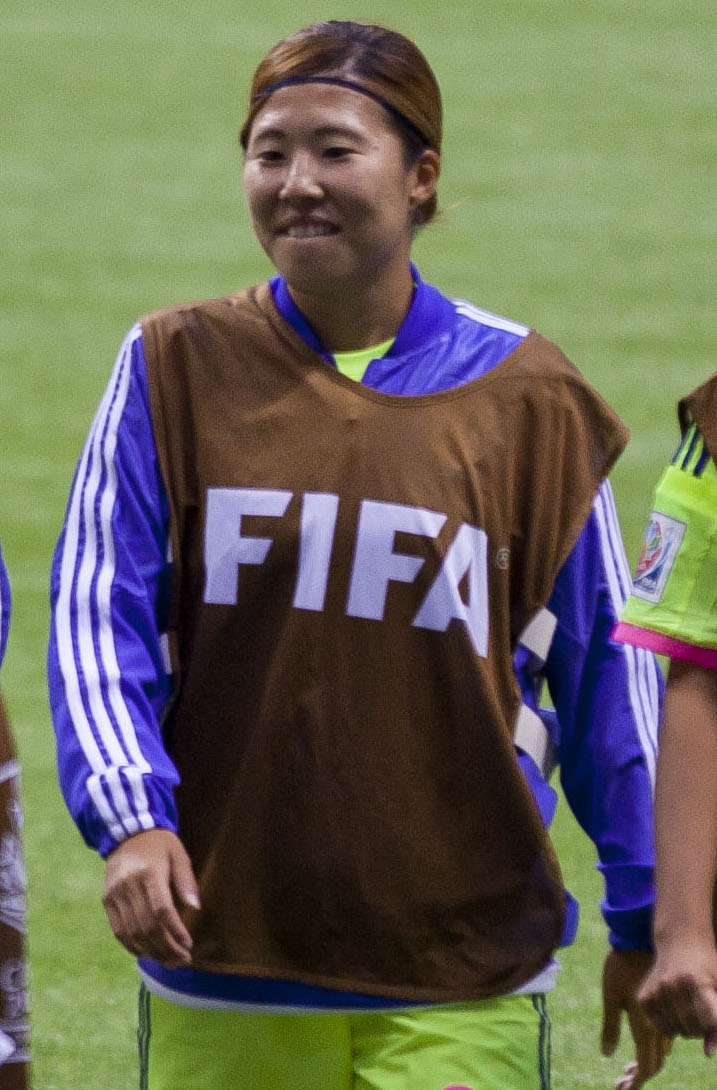
- Kawamura at the 2015 World Cup

Personal information
- Full name: Yuri Kawamura
- Date of birth: 17 May 1989 (age 37)
- Place of birth: Niigata, Niigata, Japan
- Height: 1.67 m (5 ft 5 1/2 in)
- Position: Defender

Senior career*
Years	Team	Apps	(Gls)
2002–2012	Albirex Niigata	150	(17)
2013	JEF United Chiba	13	(0)
2014–2016	Vegalta Sendai	65	(19)
2017	Albirex Niigata	0	(0)
2017–2018	North Carolina Courage	10	(0)
2019–2026	Albirex Niigata	61	(2)
Total		299	(38)

International career
2010–2017	Japan	32	(2)
Medal record
Albirex Niigata
Runner-up	Empress's Cup	2011
Vegalta Sendai
Runner-up	Nadeshiko League	2015
Representing Japan
FIFA Women's World Cup
Silver medal – second place	2015 Canada
AFC Women's Asian Cup
Gold medal – first place	2014 Vietnam
AFC U-19 Women's Championship
Silver medal – second place	2007 China
AFC U-16 Women's Championship
Gold medal – first place	2005 South Korea
- * Club domestic league appearances and goals

Yuri Kawamura (川村 優理, Kawamura Yūri; born 17 May 1989) is a Japanese former footballer who played as a defender. She has also played for Japan national team.

== Club career ==
Kawamura was born in Niigata on 17 May 1989. She played for her local club Albirex Niigata from 2004 to 2012. She moved to JEF United Chiba in 2013 and Vegalta Sendai in 2014. She was selected Best Eleven in 2015 and 2016. In 2017, she returned to Albirex Niigata.

On 4 April 2017, the North Carolina Courage signed Kawamura before the start of their first season in the National Women's Soccer League. She appeared in 8 matches, starting 7, as a defender before tearing her ACL and meniscus on 1 June 2017, in a match against the Chicago Red Stars. The injury required surgery, and the Courage placed Kawamura on the season-ending injury list.

After recovering for injury Kawamura made her 2018 season debut on 3 June against the Houston Dash. Kawamura suffered another ACL tear on 29 July during the final of the 2018 Women's International Champions Cup ending her season early due to injury for the second straight year. The Courage subsequently did not renew her contract, and no NWSL teams claimed her rights from the re-entry wire.

== National team career ==
On 13 January 2010, Kawamura debuted for Japan national team against Denmark. She was a member of Japan for 2014 Asian Cup and 2015 World Cup. Japan won the championship at 2014 Asian Cup and 2nd place at 2015 World Cup. She played 32 games and scored 2 goals for Japan until 2017.

== National team statistics ==
Japan national team
Year	Apps	Goals
2010	2	0
2011	0	0
2012	0	0
2013	2	0
2014	7	1
2015	10	1
2016	8	0
2017	3	0
Total	32	2

== Honours ==
=== International ===
Japan

- AFC Women's Asian Cup: 2014

=== Club ===
North Carolina Courage

- NWSL Champions: 2018
- NWSL Shield: 2017, 2018
