= Kana Osafune =

Japanese footballer

Kana Osafune 長船 加奈
Personal information
- Full name: Kana Osafune
- Date of birth: October 16, 1989 (age 37)
- Place of birth: Toyonaka, Osaka, Japan
- Height: 1.70 m (5 ft 7 in)
- Position: Defender

Senior career*
Years	Team	Apps	(Gls)
2008–2011	TEPCO Mareeze	56	(1)
2011	Nippon TV Beleza	11	(0)
2012–2014	Vegalta Sendai	62	(7)
2015–2024	Urawa Reds	99	(9)
2024–2025	Mynavi Sendai		
Total		190	(13)

International career
2008	Japan U-20	1	(0)
2010–2015	Japan	15	(2)
Medal record
Nippon TV Beleza
Runner-up	Nadeshiko League	2011
Urawa Reds
Runner-up	Nadeshiko League Cup	2017
Representing Japan
Asian Games
Gold medal – first place	2010 Guangzhou	Team
Silver medal – second place	2014 Incheon	Team
- * Club domestic league appearances and goals

Kana Osafune (長船 加奈, Osafune Kana; born October 16, 1989) is a Japanese former football player. She played for WE League club Mynavi Sendai and has previously also played for the Japan national team.

== Club career ==
After graduating from high school, she joined TEPCO Mareeze in 2008. However, the club was disbanded for Fukushima Daiichi nuclear disaster in 2011. In June, she moved to Nippon TV Beleza. In 2012, she moved to new club Vegalta Sendai. In 2013, she was selected Best Eleven. In 2015, she moved to Urawa Reds.

== National team career ==
In November 2008, Osafune was selected Japan U-20 national team for 2008 U-20 World Cup. On January 13, 2010, she debuted for Japan national team against Denmark. She was a member of Japan for 2010 Asian Games and Japan won the championship. She played 15 games and scored 2 goals for Japan until 2015.

== Club statistics ==
Club	Season	League		Cup		League Cup		Total	
Club	Season	Apps	Goals	Apps	Goals	Apps	Goals	Apps	Goals
TEPCO Mareeze	2008	18	0	1	0	-		19	0
TEPCO Mareeze	2009	21	1	3	0	-		24	1
TEPCO Mareeze	2010	17	0	2	0	5	0	24	0
TEPCO Mareeze	Total	56	1	6	0	5	0	67	1
Nippon TV Beleza	2011	11	0	3	1	-		14	1
Nippon TV Beleza	Total	11	0	3	1	-		14	1
Vegalta Sendai	2012								
Vegalta Sendai	Total								
Career total		67	2	9	1	5	0	81	2

== National team statistics ==
Japan national team
Year	Apps	Goals
2010	3	0
2011	0	0
2012	1	0
2013	4	0
2014	6	2
2015	1	0
Total	15	2

== International goals ==
No.	Date	Venue	Opponent	Score	Result	Competition
1.	13 September 2014	ND Soft Stadium Yamagata, Tendō, Japan	Ghana	4–0	5–0	Friendly
2.	29 September 2014	Incheon Football Stadium, Incheon, South Korea	Vietnam	2–0	3–0	2014 Asian Games
