= Wink Athletic Stadium =

Athletic stadium in Himeji, Hyogo, Japan

Coordinates: 34°49′18″N 134°40′15″E

Himeji Athletic Stadium
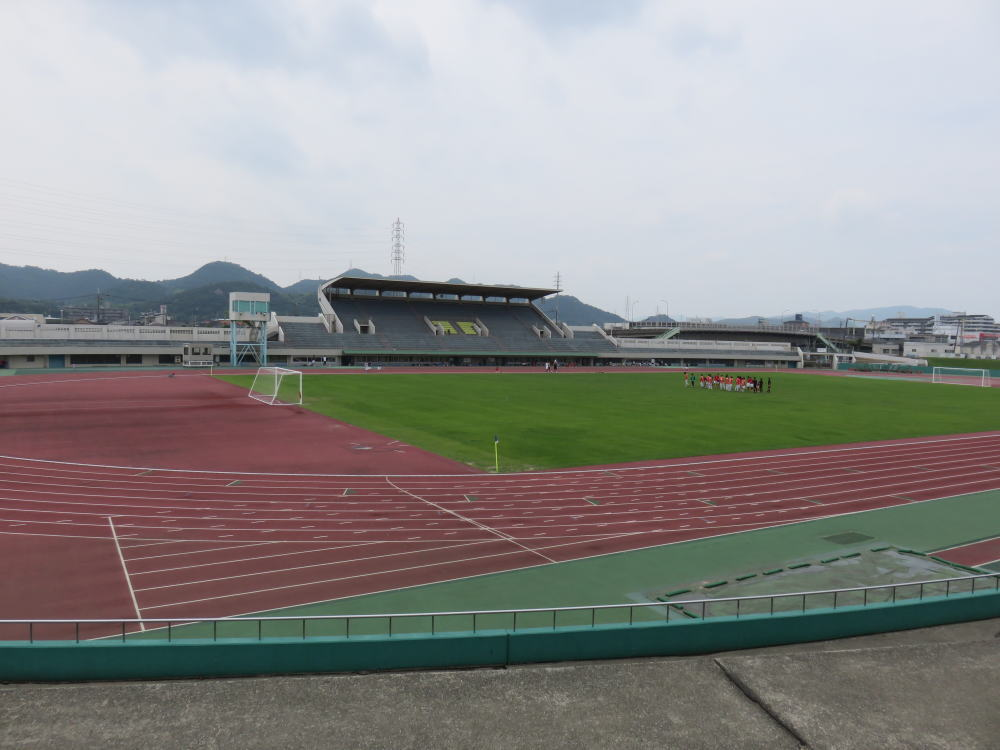
- Interactive map of Himeji Athletic Stadium
- Location: Himeji, Hyogo, Japan
- Owner: Himeji City
- Capacity: 15,000

Tenant
- AS Harima Albion

Himeji Athletic Stadium is an athletic stadium in Himeji, Hyogo, Japan.
