= Yuiko Konno =

Japanese footballer (born 1980)

Yuiko Konno 金野 結子
Personal information
- Full name: Yuiko Konno
- Date of birth: October 10, 1980 (age 46)
- Place of birth: Chiba, Japan
- Height: 1.60 m (5 ft 3 in)
- Position: Midfielder

Senior career*
Years	Team	Apps	(Gls)
2006–2010	JEF United Chiba		

International career
2010	Japan	1	(0)
- * Club domestic league appearances and goals

Yuiko Konno (金野 結子, Konno Yuiko; born October 10, 1980) is a former Japanese football player. She played for the Japan national team.

== Club career ==
Konno was born in Chiba Prefecture on October 10, 1980. She played for her local club, JEF United Chiba. She retired at the end of the 2010 season.

== National team career ==
On May 11, 2010, when Konno was 29 years old, she played for the Japan national team against Mexico.

== National team statistics ==
Japan national team
Year	Apps	Goals
2010	1	0
Total	1	0
