= Saori Arimachi =

Japanese footballer (born 1988)

Saori Arimachi 有町 紗央里
Personal information
- Full name: Saori Arimachi
- Date of birth: July 12, 1988 (age 38)
- Place of birth: Sakai, Fukui, Japan
- Height: 1.60 m (5 ft 3 in)
- Position: Forward

Team information
- Current team: Mynavi Vegalta Sendai
- Number: 10

Youth career
- 2004–2006: Fukui University of Technology Fukui High School

Senior career*
| Years | Team | Apps | (Gls) |
| 2007 | Ohara Gakuen JaSRA | 15 | (5) |
| 2008–2014 | Okayama Yunogo Belle | 132 | (32) |
| 2015– | Mynavi Vegalta Sendai | 60 | (11) |
| Total | | 187 | (48) |

International career
| 2008 | Japan U-20 | 1 | (0) |
| 2013–2016 | Japan | 6 | (0) |
Medal record
Okayama Yunogo Belle
| Runner-up | Nadeshiko League Cup | 2013 |
Mynavi Vegalta Sendai
| Runner-up | Nadeshiko League | 2015 |
Representing Japan
AFC U-19 Women's Championship
| Silver medal – second place | 2007 China |
- * Club domestic league appearances and goals as of December 31, 2018

Saori Arimachi (有町 紗央里, Arimachi Saori; born July 12, 1988) is a Japanese footballer who plays as a forward. She plays for Mynavi Vegalta Sendai and has previously played for the Japan women's team.

== Club career ==
Arimachi was born in Sakai, Fukui on July 12, 1988. After graduating from high school, she joined Ohara Gakuen JaSRA in 2007. In 2008, she moved to Okayama Yunogo Belle. In 2015, she moved to Vegalta Sendai (later Mynavi Vegalta Sendai).

== National team career ==
In November 2008, Arimachi was selected Japan U-20 national team for 2008 U-20 World Cup. On September 22, 2013, she first played for Japan national team against Nigeria. She played six games for Japan until 2016.

== National team statistics ==
Japan national team
| Year | Apps | Goals |
|---|---|---|
| 2013 | 1 | 0 |
| 2014 | 0 | 0 |
| 2015 | 4 | 0 |
| 2016 | 1 | 0 |
| Total | 6 | 0 |
