= Erina Yamane =

Japanese footballer (born 1990)

Erina Yamane 山根 恵里奈
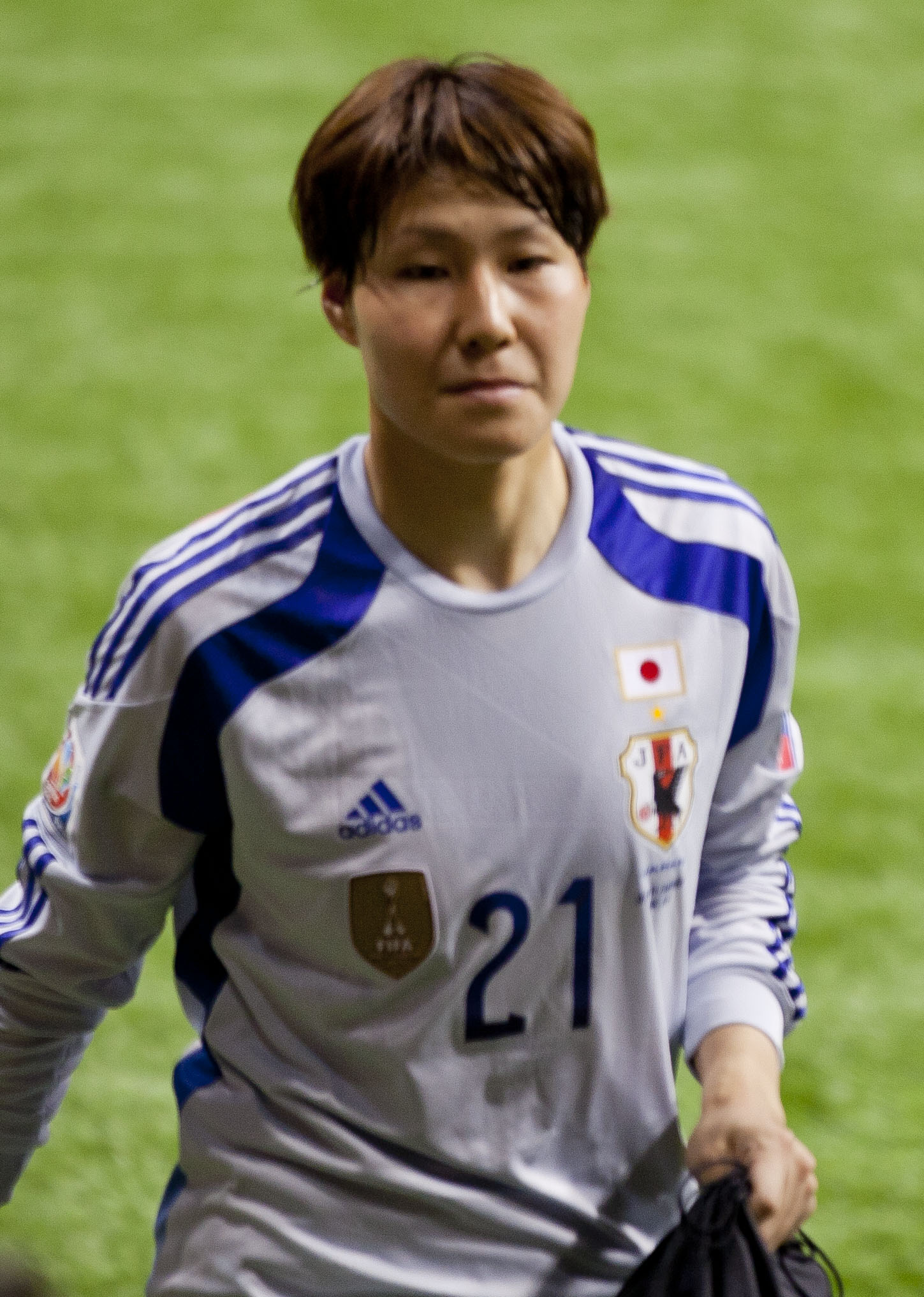
- Yamane in 2015

Personal information
- Full name: Erina Yamane
- Date of birth: December 20, 1990 (age 35)
- Place of birth: Hiroshima, Hiroshima, Japan
- Height: 1.87 m (6 ft 1 1/2 in)
- Position: Goalkeeper

Youth career
- 2006–2008: JFA Academy Fukushima

Senior career*
| Years | Team | Apps | (Gls) |
| 2009–2011 | TEPCO Mareeze | 1 | (0) |
| 2012–2017 | JEF United Chiba | 92 | (0) |
| 2017–2019 | Real Betis | 32 | (0) |
| 2019–2020 | JEF United Chiba | 0 | (0) |
| Total | | 125 | (0) |

International career^{‡}
| 2008–2010 | Japan U-20 | 4 | (0) |
| 2010–2019 | Japan | 26 | (0) |
Medal record
JEF United Chiba
| Winner | Nadeshiko League Cup | 2017 |
| Runner-up | Nadeshiko League Cup | 2016 |
| Runner-up | Empress's Cup | 2012 |
Representing Japan
FIFA Women's World Cup
| Silver medal – second place | 2015 Canada |
AFC Women's Asian Cup
| Gold medal – first place | 2014 Vietnam |
Asian Games
| Silver medal – second place | 2014 Incheon | Team |
AFC U-19 Women's Championship
| Gold medal – first place | 2009 China |
| Silver medal – second place | 2007 China |
- * Club domestic league appearances and goals as of August 1, 2019 ‡ National team caps and goals as of March 5, 2019

Erina Yamane (山根 恵里奈, Yamane Erina; born December 20, 1990) is a Japanese former footballer who played as a goalkeeper. She formerly played for the Japan national team.

== Club career ==
Yamane was born in Hiroshima on December 20, 1990. After graduating from JFA Academy Fukushima, she joined TEPCO Mareeze based in Fukushima Prefecture club in 2009. However, the club was disbanded for Fukushima Daiichi nuclear disaster in 2011. She moved to JEF United Chiba in 2012. She left the club in July 2017. In August, she joined Spanish Primera División club Real Betis. She played for the club in 2 seasons. In August 2019, she returned to JEF United Chiba.

== National team career ==
In November 2008, Yamane was selected for Japan U-20 national team for 2008 U-20 World Cup. On January 15, 2010, she debuted for Japan national team against Chile. In July, she was selected Japan U-20 team for 2010 U-20 World Cup. She was a member of Japan's squads for the 2014 Asian Cup and the 2014 Asian Games. Japan won the championship at Asian Cup and 2nd place at Asian Games. In 2015, she also played at 2015 World Cup and Japan won 2nd place. She played 23 games for Japan until 2017.

== National team statistics ==
Japan national team
| Year | Apps | Goals |
|---|---|---|
| 2010 | 1 | 0 |
| 2011 | 0 | 0 |
| 2012 | 0 | 0 |
| 2013 | 3 | 0 |
| 2014 | 9 | 0 |
| 2015 | 5 | 0 |
| 2016 | 3 | 0 |
| 2017 | 2 | 0 |
| 2018 | 0 | 0 |
| 2019 | 3 | 0 |
| Total | 26 | 0 |
