= Sonoko Chiba =

Japanese footballer

Sonoko Chiba 千葉 園子
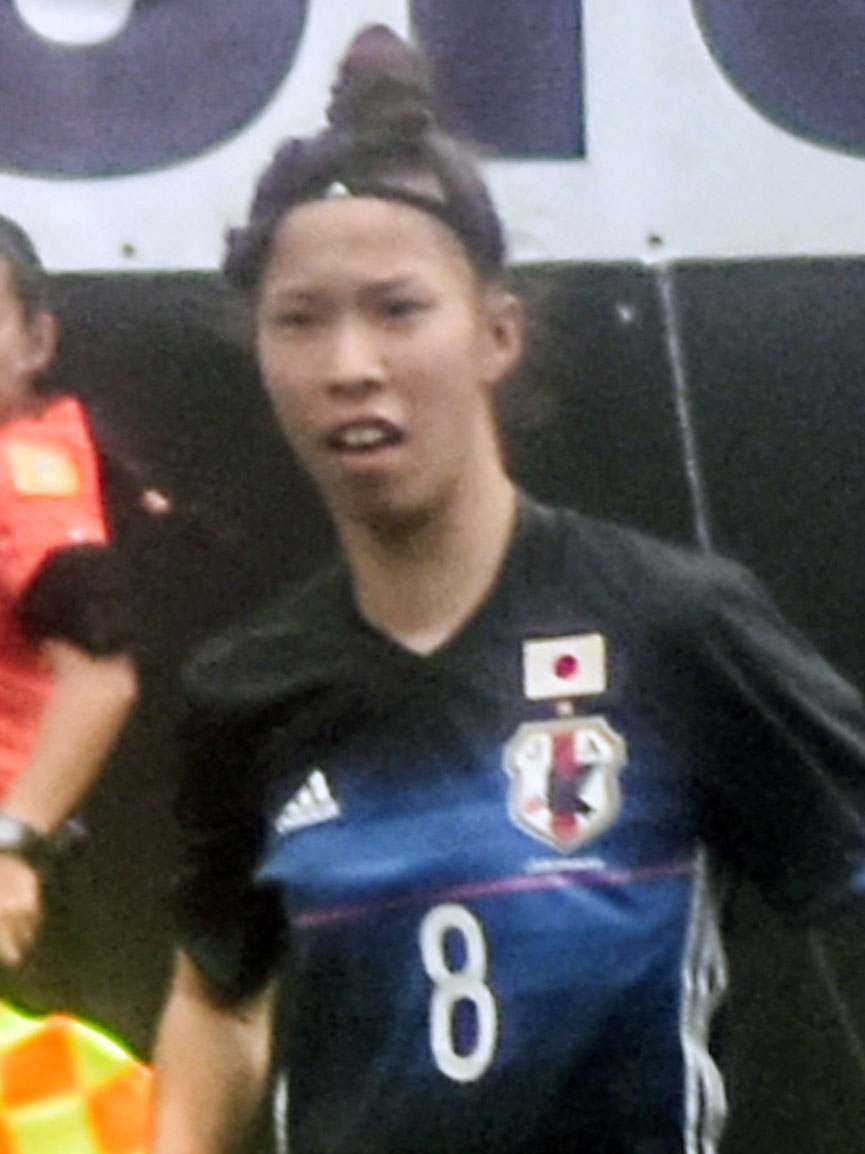

Personal information
- Full name: Sonoko Chiba
- Date of birth: June 15, 1993 (age 33)
- Place of birth: Osaka, Osaka, Japan
- Height: 1.62 m (5 ft 4 in)
- Position: Midfielder

Team information
- Current team: AS Harima Albion
- Number: 10

Youth career
- 2009–2011: Hinomoto Gakuen High School
- 2012–2013: Himeji Hinomoto College

Senior career*
Years	Team	Apps	(Gls)
2014–	AS Harima Albion	81	(21)
Total		61	(21)

International career
2016–2017	Japan	5	(0)
- * Club domestic league appearances and goals as of December 31, 2017

Sonoko Chiba (千葉 園子, Chiba Sonoko; born June 15, 1993) is a Japanese footballer who plays as a midfielder. She plays for AS Harima Albion and has previously been part of the Japan national team.

== Club career ==
Chiba was born in Osaka on June 15, 1993. After graduating from Himeji Hinomoto College, she joined AS Harima Albion based in Himeji in 2014.

== National team career ==
On June 2, 2016, Chiba debuted for Japan national team against United States. She played 5 games for Japan until 2017.

== National team statistics ==
Japan national team
Year	Apps	Goals
2016	3	0
2017	2	0
Total	5	0
