= Maiko Nasu =

Japanese footballer

Maiko Nasu 那須 麻衣子
Personal information
- Full name: Maiko Nasu
- Date of birth: July 31, 1984 (age 42)
- Place of birth: Nabari, Mie, Japan
- Position: Midfielder

Senior career*
Years	Team	Apps	(Gls)
1999–2006	Iga FC Kunoichi		
2007–2011	INAC Kobe Leonessa		
2012–2016	Iga FC Kunoichi		

International career
2002	Japan U-20	2	(0)
2009–2011	Japan	3	(0)
Medal record
Iga FC Kunoichi
Winner	Nadeshiko League	1999
Runner-up	Nadeshiko League	2000
Runner-up	Nadeshiko League Cup	1999
Winner	Empress's Cup	2001
Runner-up	Empress's Cup	1999
INAC Kobe Leonessa
Winner	Nadeshiko League	2011
Runner-up	Nadeshiko League	2008
Winner	Empress's Cup	2010
Winner	Empress's Cup	2011
Runner-up	Empress's Cup	2008
- * Club domestic league appearances and goals

Maiko Nasu (那須 麻衣子, Nasu Maiko; born July 31, 1984) is a Japanese former footballer who played as a midfielder. She played for Japan national team.

== Club career ==
Nasu was born in Nabari on July 31, 1984. She joined her local club Prima Ham FC Kunoichi (later Iga FC Kunoichi) in 1999. The club won the champions in 1999 season and the 2nd place in 2000 season. In 2007, she moved to INAC Kobe Leonessa. The club won the champions in 2011 season. In 2012, she returned to Iga FC Kunoichi. She retired end of 2016 season.

== National team career ==
In August 2002, Nasu was selected Japan U-20 national team for 2002 U-19 World Championship. On August 1, 2009, she debuted for Japan national team against France. She played 3 games for Japan until 2011.

== National team statistics ==
Japan national team
Year	Apps	Goals
2009	2	0
2010	0	0
2011	1	0
Total	3	0
