= Madoka Haji =

Japanese footballer

Madoka Haji 櫨 まどか
Personal information
- Full name: Madoka Haji
- Date of birth: July 8, 1988 (age 38)
- Place of birth: Nagoya, Aichi, Japan
- Height: 1.64 m (5 ft 4 1/2 in)
- Position: Forward

Team information
- Current team: Suwon UDC
- Number: 5

Youth career
- 2004–2006: Seiwa Gakuen High School

Senior career*
Years	Team	Apps	(Gls)
2007–2011	INAC Kobe Leonessa	54	(3)
2012–2017	Iga FC Kunoichi	100	(8)
2018	Mynavi Vegalta Sendai	15	(0)
2019–	Suwon UDC	0	(0)
Total		169	(11)

International career
2017–2018	Japan	7	(0)
Medal record
INAC Kobe Leonessa
Winner	Nadeshiko League	2011
Runner-up	Nadeshiko League	2008
Winner	Empress's Cup	2010
Winner	Empress's Cup	2011
Runner-up	Empress's Cup	2008
- * Club domestic league appearances and goals as of December 31, 2018

Madoka Haji (櫨 まどか, Haji Madoka; born July 8, 1988) is a Japanese footballer who plays as a forward for Suwon UDC and the Japan national team.

== Club career ==
Haji was born in Nagoya on July 8, 1988. After graduating from high school, she joined INAC Kobe Leonessa in 2007. In 2012, she moved to Iga FC Kunoichi. In 2018, she moved to Mynavi Vegalta Sendai. In 2019, she moved to the South Korean club Suwon UDC.

== National team career ==
On July 30, 2017, Haji played for the Japan national team for the first time against Australia. She played seven games for Japan until 2018.

== National team statistics ==
Japan national team
Year	Apps	Goals
2017	6	0
2018	1	0
Total	7	0
