= Hikari Takagi =

Japanese footballer

Hikari Takagi 高木 ひかり
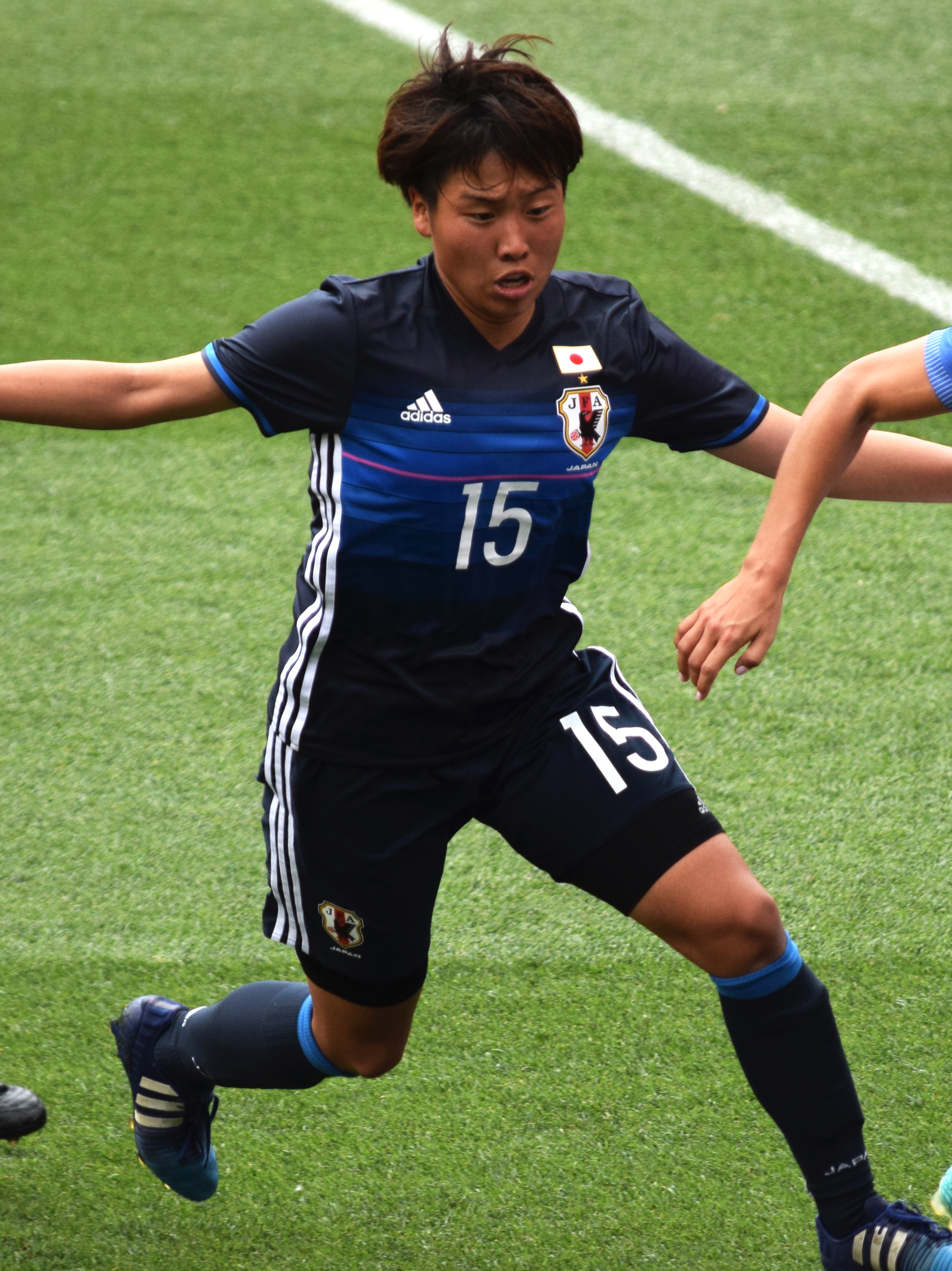

Personal information
- Full name: Hikari Takagi
- Date of birth: May 21, 1993 (age 33)
- Place of birth: Mishima, Shizuoka, Japan
- Height: 1.65 m (5 ft 5 in)
- Position: Defender

Team information
- Current team: Nojima Stella Kanagawa Sagamihara
- Number: 19

Youth career
- 2009–2011: Tokoha Gakuen Tachibana High School
- 2012–2015: Waseda University

Senior career*
Years	Team	Apps	(Gls)
2016–	Nojima Stella Kanagawa Sagamihara	53	(4)
Total		53	(4)

International career
2010	Japan U-17	5	(1)
2012	Japan U-20	5	(0)
2016–2018	Japan	19	(1)
Medal record
Nojima Stella Kanagawa Sagamihara
Runner-up	Empress's Cup	2017
Representing Japan
AFC Women's Asian Cup
Gold medal – first place	2018 Jordan
Asian Games
Gold medal – first place	2018 Jakarta-Palembang	Team
FIFA U-20 Women's World Cup
Bronze medal – third place	2012 Japan
AFC U-19 Women's Championship
Gold medal – first place	2011 Vietnam
FIFA U-17 Women's World Cup
Silver medal – second place	2010 Trinidad and Tobago
AFC U-16 Women's Championship
Bronze medal – third place	2009 Thailand
- * Club domestic league appearances and goals as of December 31, 2018

Hikari Takagi (高木 ひかり, Takagi Hikari; born May 21, 1993) is a Japanese footballer who plays as a defender. She plays for Nojima Stella Kanagawa Sagamihara and the Japan national team.

== Club career ==
Takagi was born in Mishima on May 21, 1993. After graduating from Waseda University, she joined Nojima Stella Kanagawa Sagamihara in 2016.

== National team career ==
Hikari played for Japan U-17 national team at 2010 U-17 World Cup Japan won 2nd place and U-20 team at 2012 U-20 World Cup Japan won 3rd place. On June 5, 2016, she debuted for Japan national team against United States. She was a member of Japan for 2018 Asian Cup and Japan won the championship. She played 19 games and scored 1 goal for Japan until 2018.

== National team statistics ==
Japan national team
Year	Apps	Goals
2016	1	0
2017	12	0
2018	6	1
Total	19	1
