= Himeji Hinomoto College =

Coordinates: 34°55′3.6″N 134°43′44.2″E

Himeji Hinomoto College (姫路日ノ本短期大学, Himeji hinomoto tanki daigaku) is a private junior college in Himeji, Hyōgo, Japan, established in 1974.
