= Mayu Sasaki =

Japanese footballer

Mayu Sasaki 佐々木 繭
Personal information
- Full name: Mayu Sasaki
- Date of birth: January 12, 1993 (age 33)
- Place of birth: Sagamihara, Kanagawa, Japan
- Height: 1.60 m (5 ft 3 in)
- Position: Defender

Youth career
- 2008–2010: Seiwa Gakuen High School
- 2011–2012: Musashigaoka College

Senior career*
Years	Team	Apps	(Gls)
2013–2017	Mynavi Vegalta Sendai	78	(3)
2018–2024	Urawa Reds	15	(0)
Total		93	(3)

International career
2016–2017	Japan	8	(0)
Medal record
Mynavi Vegalta Sendai
Runner-up	Nadeshiko League	2015
- * Club domestic league appearances and goals

Mayu Sasaki (佐々木 繭, Sasaki Mayu; born January 12, 1993) is a Japanese former football player who played for WE League club Urawa Reds. She has previously played for Japan national team.

== Club career ==
Sasaki was born in Sagamihara on January 12, 1993. After graduating from Musashigaoka College, she joined Vegalta Sendai (later Mynavi Vegalta Sendai) in 2013. In 2018, she moved to Urawa Reds.

== National team career ==
On June 2, 2016, Sasaki debuted for Japan national team against United States. She played 8 games for Japan until 2017.

== National team statistics ==
Japan national team
Year	Apps	Goals
2016	3	0
2017	5	0
Total	8	0
