= 2013 Nadeshiko League Cup =

Statistics of Nadeshiko League Cup in the 2013 season.

== Overview ==
INAC Kobe Leonessa won the championship.

== Results ==
=== Qualifying round ===
==== Group A ====
| Pos | Team | Pld | W | D | L | GF | GA | GD | Pts |
|---|---|---|---|---|---|---|---|---|---|
| 1 | INAC Kobe Leonessa | 8 | 5 | 3 | 0 | 18 | 7 | +11 | 18 |
| 2 | Okayama Yunogo Belle | 8 | 5 | 1 | 2 | 21 | 12 | +9 | 16 |
| 3 | Albirex Niigata Ladies | 8 | 2 | 3 | 3 | 6 | 11 | −5 | 9 |
| 4 | Vegalta Sendai Ladies | 8 | 2 | 1 | 5 | 10 | 16 | −6 | 7 |
| 5 | Iga FC Kunoichi | 8 | 2 | 0 | 6 | 8 | 17 | −9 | 6 |

==== Group B ====
| Pos | Team | Pld | W | D | L | GF | GA | GD | Pts |
|---|---|---|---|---|---|---|---|---|---|
| 1 | Nippon TV Beleza | 8 | 7 | 1 | 0 | 22 | 5 | +17 | 22 |
| 2 | JEF United Chiba Ladies | 8 | 5 | 1 | 2 | 16 | 8 | +8 | 16 |
| 3 | Urawa Reds Ladies | 8 | 3 | 2 | 3 | 13 | 8 | +5 | 11 |
| 4 | Speranza FC Osaka-Takatsuki | 8 | 2 | 0 | 6 | 6 | 16 | −10 | 6 |
| 5 | FC Kibi International University Charme | 8 | 1 | 0 | 7 | 9 | 29 | −20 | 3 |

=== Final round ===
==== Semifinals ====
- INAC Kobe Leonessa 2-1 JEF United Chiba Ladies
- Nippon TV Beleza 0-2 Okayama Yunogo Belle

==== Final ====
- INAC Kobe Leonessa 3-1 Okayama Yunogo Belle
