= Okayama Yunogo Belle =

Okayama Yunogo Belle 岡山湯郷ベル
- Full name: Okayama Yunogo Belle
- Nickname(s): Yunogo Belle
- Founded: 2001
- Ground: Mimasaka Rugby Football Field
- Capacity: 5,000
- Chairman: Yuzo Tanimoto
- Manager: Hiroshi Taniguchi
- League: Nadeshiko League Div.2
- 2024: 1st of 12
- Website: https://www.yunogo-belle.com/
Home colours	Away colours

The Okayama Yunogo Belle is a Japanese women's football club based in Mimasaka, Okayama, Japan, that will compete in Nadeshiko League Division 1 in 2025.

Founded in 2001, it debuted in the Nadeshiko League in 2003, where it has played since the 2004 season. Its best results to date are a third-place finish in 2012. In 2006 the club also reached the national cup's final.

== Squad ==
=== Current squad ===
As of 10 July 2023.

Note: Flags indicate national team as defined under FIFA eligibility rules; some limited exceptions apply. Players may hold more than one non-FIFA nationality.

No.	Pos.	Nation	Player
1	GK	(Japan) JPN	Fuki Yamada (山田 蕗)
2	DF	(Japan) JPN	Miku Tasaki (多崎 美玖)
4	MF	(Japan) JPN	Minori Yonemoto (米本 みの里)
5	DF	(Japan) JPN	Konomi Uchida (内田 好美)
6	DF	(Japan) JPN	Hikaru Nakamura (中村 ひかる)
7	MF	(Japan) JPN	Miona Yamada (山田 美緒和)
8	FW	(Japan) JPN	Akari Machida (町田 朱里)
9	FW	(Japan) JPN	Yuka Toriumi (鳥海 由佳)
10	FW	(Japan) JPN	Kumi Yokoyama (横山 久美)
11	FW	(Japan) JPN	Sana Kishino (岸野 早奈)
13	MF	(Japan) JPN	Miu Akimoto (秋元 美雨)
14	DF	(Japan) JPN	Hitomi Konno (今野 瞳)

No.	Pos.	Nation	Player
15	MF	(Japan) JPN	Asuka Kondo (近藤 あすか)
16	MF	(Japan) JPN	Hikaru Nemoto (根本 ひかる)
17	DF	(Japan) JPN	Ayana Kobayashi (小林 亜耶奈)
18	DF	(Japan) JPN	Nanase Murakami (村上 夏奈瀬)
19	MF	(Japan) JPN	Sayaka Yamashita (山下 沙耶香)
20	FW	(Japan) JPN	Ayumi Jyokura (城倉 歩未)
22	FW	(Japan) JPN	Matsuri Katayama (片山 真鞠)
24	FW	(Japan) JPN	Misora Kisu (木須 みそら)
25	MF	(Japan) JPN	Fuka Araya (新谷 楓華)
31	GK	(Chinese Taipei) TPE	Cheng Ssu-yu (程 思瑜)
39	FW	(Japan) JPN	Konomi Taniguchi (谷口 木乃実)

== Honours ==
=== Domestic competitions ===
- Nadeshiko League Division 2
  - Winners (1) : 2024
- Empress's Cup All-Japan Women's Football Tournament
  - Runners-up (1) : 2006
- Nadeshiko League Cup
  - Runners-up (1) : 2013

== Results ==
Season	Domestic league				National cup	League cup
Season	League	Level	Place	Tms.	National cup	League cup
2002	Chugoku	2	1st		2nd Stage	-
2003	L	1	8th	13	Quarter-finals	-
2004	L2	2	1st	6	Quarter-finals	-
2005	L1	1	6th	8	Semi-finals	-
2006	Nadeshiko; Div.1	1	4th	8	Runners-up	-
2007	Nadeshiko; Div.1	1	5th	8	Quarter-finals	Group stage
2008	Nadeshiko; Div.1	1	5th	8	Quarter-finals	-
2009	Nadeshiko; Div.1	1	6th	8	Quarter-finals	-
2010	Nadeshiko	1	5th	10	Quarter-finals	Group stage
2011	Nadeshiko	1	4th	9	Semi-finals	-
2012	Nadeshiko	1	3rd	10	Quarter-finals	Group stage
2013	Nadeshiko	1	3rd	10	Semi-finals	Runners-up
2014	Nadeshiko	1	4th	10	Quarter-finals	-
2015	Nadeshiko Div.1	1	8th	10	3rd stage	-
2016	Nadeshiko Div.1	1	10th	10	3rd stage	Group stage
2017	Nadeshiko Div.2	2	8th	10	2nd stage	Group stage / Div.2
2018	Nadeshiko Div.2	2	10th	10	2nd stage	Semi-finals
2019	Challenge West	3	4th	6	2nd stage	Group stage / Div.2
2020	Challenge West	3	5th	6	1st stage	Cancelled
2021	Nadeshiko Div.2	3	8th	8	Qualifying	—
2022	Nadeshiko Div.2	3	10th	10	1st stage	—
2023	Nadeshiko Div.2	3	3rd	10	2nd round	—
2024	Nadeshiko Div.2	3	1st	12		—

== See also ==
- List of women's football clubs in Japan
