= 2010 AFC Women's Asian Cup squads =

List of players competing at the 17th edition of the AFC Women's Asian Cup

This article lists the squads for the 2010 AFC Women's Asian Cup, the 17th edition of the AFC Women's Asian Cup. The tournament is a quadrennial women's international football tournament for national teams in Asia organised by the Asian Football Confederation (AFC), and was held in China from 19 to 30 May 2010. In the tournament there were involved eight national teams. Each national team registered a final squad of 23 players.

The age listed for each player is on 19 May 2010, the first day of the tournament. The numbers of caps and goals listed for each player do not include any matches played after the start of tournament. The club listed is the club for which the player last played a competitive match prior to the tournament. The nationality for each club reflects the national association (not the league) to which the club is affiliated. A flag is included for coaches that are of a different nationality than their own national team.

== Group A ==
=== Japan ===
Coach: Norio Sasaki

The squad was announced on 16 May 2010.

No.	Pos.	Player	Date of birth (age)	Caps	Goals	Club
1	GK	Nozomi Yamago	16 January 1975 (aged 35)	90	0	(Japan Football Association) Urawa Reds
2	DF	Azusa Iwashimizu	14 October 1986 (aged 23)	50	6	(Japan Football Association) Nippon TV Tokyo Verdy Beleza
3	DF	Kyoko Yano	3 June 1984 (aged 25)	58	1	(Japan Football Association) Urawa Reds
4	DF	Saki Kumagai	17 October 1990 (aged 19)	9	0	(Japan Football Association) Urawa Reds
5	DF	Yukari Kinga	2 May 1984 (aged 26)	47	4	(Japan Football Association) Nippon TV Tokyo Verdy Beleza
6	MF	Aya Sameshima	16 June 1987 (aged 22)	13	1	(Japan Football Association) TEPCO Mareeze
7	FW	Kozue Ando	9 July 1982 (aged 27)	74	14	(German Football Association) FCR 2001 Duisburg
8	MF	Aya Miyama	28 January 1985 (aged 25)	77	21	(United States Soccer Federation) Saint Louis Athletica
9	FW	Yūki Nagasato	15 July 1987 (aged 22)	55	28	(German Football Association) Turbine Potsdam
10	MF	Homare Sawa	6 September 1978 (aged 31)	152	72	(United States Soccer Federation) Washington Freedom
11	FW	Shinobu Ohno	23 January 1984 (aged 26)	75	31	(Japan Football Association) Nippon TV Tokyo Verdy Beleza
12	GK	Ayumi Kaihori	4 September 1986 (aged 23)	9	0	(Japan Football Association) INAC Kobe Leonessa
13	FW	Mami Yamaguchi	13 August 1986 (aged 23)	8	4	(United States Soccer Federation) Atlanta Beat
14	MF	Rumi Utsugi	5 December 1988 (aged 21)	34	4	(Japan Football Association) Nippon TV Tokyo Verdy Beleza
15	DF	Nayuha Toyoda	15 September 1986 (aged 23)	21	0	(Japan Football Association) Nippon TV Tokyo Verdy Beleza
16	DF	Akiko Sudo	7 April 1984 (aged 26)	13	3	(Japan Football Association) Nippon TV Tokyo Verdy Beleza
17	MF	Megumi Kamionobe	15 March 1986 (aged 24)	4	0	(Japan Football Association) Albirex Niigata
18	MF	Manami Nakano	30 August 1986 (aged 23)	7	1	(Japan Football Association) Okayama Yunogo Belle
20	MF	Yuika Sugasawa	5 October 1990 (aged 19)	5	0	(Japan Football Association) Albirex Niigata
21	GK	Miho Fukumoto	2 October 1983 (aged 26)	50	0	(Japan Football Association) Okayama Yunogo Belle
22	FW	Megumi Takase	10 November 1990 (aged 19)	6	3	(Japan Football Association) INAC Kobe Leonessa
24	MF	Nahomi Kawasumi	23 September 1985 (aged 24)	4	0	(Japan Football Association) INAC Kobe Leonessa
36	MF	Chiaki Minamiyama	16 October 1985 (aged 24)	2	2	(Japan Football Association) Nippon TV Tokyo Verdy Beleza

=== Myanmar ===
Coach: U Aye Kyu

No.	Pos.	Player	Date of birth (age)	Caps	Goals	Club
1	GK	May Khin Ya Min	11 January 1986 (aged 24)			
2	FW	Myint Myint Aye	27 December 1988 (aged 21)			
3	DF	San San Thein	10 July 1981 (aged 28)			
4	DF	San San Maw	5 October 1980 (aged 29)			
5	DF	Moe Moe War	21 September 1984 (aged 25)			
6	MF	Than Than Htwe	24 July 1986 (aged 23)			
7	MF	Thu Zar Htwe	30 November 1984 (aged 25)			
8	MF	San Yu Naing	31 December 1987 (aged 22)			
9	FW	My Nilar Htwe	10 November 1979 (aged 30)			
10	FW	Khin Marlar Tun	21 May 1988 (aged 21)			
11	MF	Aye Nandar Hlaing	27 September 1983 (aged 26)			
12	DF	Nay Zar Lin Lin Aung	2 December 1983 (aged 26)			
17	MF	Aye Aye Mar	14 December 1988 (aged 21)			
19	MF	Thandar Moe	27 December 1988 (aged 21)			
20	FW	Yee Yee Oo	1 August 1990 (aged 19)			
21	FW	Margret Marri	16 October 1986 (aged 23)			
22	MF	Khin Moe Wai	16 December 1989 (aged 20)			
24	MF	Nan Nhin Nhin Htwe	27 December 1989 (aged 20)			
25	GK	Thin Thin Soe	3 October 1989 (aged 20)			
27	FW	Naw Ar Lo Wer Phaw	11 January 1988 (aged 22)			

=== North Korea ===
Coach: Kim Kwang-min

No.	Pos.	Player	Date of birth (age)	Caps	Goals	Club
1	GK	Hong Myong-hui	4 September 1991 (aged 18)			
3	DF	Kwon Jong-sun	29 December 1985 (aged 24)			
4	DF	Yun Song-mi	28 January 1992 (aged 18)			
5	DF	Choe Yong-sim	13 October 1990 (aged 19)			
6	DF	Ra Un-sim	2 July 1988 (aged 21)			
7	MF	Choe Un-ju	23 January 1991 (aged 19)			
8	MF	Jo Yun-mi I	5 January 1987 (aged 23)			
9	MF	Ri Ye-gyong	26 October 1989 (aged 20)			
10	FW	Kim Yong-ae	7 March 1983 (aged 27)			
11	MF	Kim Kyong-hwa	28 March 1986 (aged 24)			
12	MF	Kim Un-ju	9 April 1993 (aged 17)			
13	MF	Kim Chung-sim	27 November 1990 (aged 19)			
14	FW	Yun Hyon-hi	9 September 1992 (aged 17)			
15	MF	Mun Chol-mi	2 July 1981 (aged 28)			
16	DF	Yu Jong-hui	21 March 1986 (aged 24)			
17	FW	Jon Myong-hwa	9 August 1993 (aged 16)			
18	GK	Jo Yun-mi II	22 May 1989 (aged 20)			
19	DF	Jong Pok-sim	31 July 1985 (aged 24)			
20	MF	Ri Hyon-suk	20 July 1989 (aged 20)			
21	DF	Song Jong-sun	11 March 1981 (aged 29)			
22	GK	Ri Jin-sim	29 May 1991 (aged 18)			

=== Thailand ===
Coach: Jatuporn Pramualban

The squad was announced on 5 May 2010.

No.	Pos.	Player	Date of birth (age)	Caps	Goals	Club
1	GK	Waraporn Boonsing	16 February 1990 (aged 20)			
2	DF	Darut Changplook	3 February 1988 (aged 22)			
3	DF	Taveeporn Pholsuwan	10 December 1989 (aged 20)			
4	DF	Duangnapa Sritala	4 February 1986 (aged 24)			
5	DF	Kwanruethai Kunupatham	19 October 1990 (aged 19)			
6	DF	Pikul Khueanpet	20 September 1988 (aged 21)			
7	MF	Wajee Kertsombun	2 April 1988 (aged 22)			
8	MF	Junpen Seesraum (captain)	11 May 1987 (aged 23)			
9	MF	Warunee Phetwiset	13 December 1990 (aged 19)			
10	DF	Sunisa Srangthaisong	6 May 1988 (aged 22)			
11	MF	Kanjana Sungngoen	21 September 1986 (aged 23)			
12	MF	Chidtawan Chawong	19 June 1989 (aged 20)			
13	FW	Pitsamai Sornsai	19 January 1989 (aged 21)			
14	FW	Sukunya Peangthem	5 September 1988 (aged 21)			
15	MF	Waranya Chaikantree	5 December 1987 (aged 22)			
17	DF	Anootsara Maijarern	14 February 1986 (aged 24)			
18	GK	Pannipa Kamolrat	8 October 1988 (aged 21)			
19	MF	Treeratchada Boonpload	19 February 1989 (aged 21)			
20	MF	Wilaiporn Boothduang	25 June 1987 (aged 22)			
21	DF	Thidarat Wiwasukhu	18 February 1985 (aged 25)			
22	GK	Sukanya Chor Charoenying	24 November 1987 (aged 22)			
23	FW	Nisa Romyen	18 January 1990 (aged 20)			
31	DF	Phumphuang Ngoendi	6 January 1988 (aged 22)			

== Group B ==
=== Australia ===
Coach: (Scotland) Tom Sermanni

The squad was announced on 15 May 2010.

No.	Pos.	Player	Date of birth (age)	Caps	Goals	Club
1	GK	Melissa Barbieri (captain)	20 February 1980 (aged 30)			(Football Australia) Melbourne Victory
3	DF	Karla Reuter	14 June 1984 (aged 25)			(Football Australia) Brisbane Roar
4	DF	Clare Polkinghorne	1 February 1989 (aged 21)			(Football Australia) Brisbane Roar
5	MF	Lauren Colthorpe	25 October 1985 (aged 24)			(Football Australia) Brisbane Roar
6	MF	Servet Uzunlar	8 March 1989 (aged 21)			(Football Australia) Sydney FC
7	MF	Heather Garriock	21 December 1982 (aged 27)			(Football Australia) Sydney FC
9	FW	Sarah Walsh	11 January 1983 (aged 27)			(United States Soccer Federation) Boston Breakers
10	MF	Kylie Ledbrook	20 March 1986 (aged 24)			(Football Australia) Sydney FC
11	FW	Lisa De Vanna	14 November 1984 (aged 25)			(United States Soccer Federation) Washington Freedom
12	FW	Kate Gill	10 December 1984 (aged 25)			(Swedish Football Association) LdB Malmö
13	DF	Thea Slatyer	2 February 1983 (aged 27)			(Football Australia) Canberra United
14	MF	Collette McCallum	26 March 1986 (aged 24)			(Football Australia) Perth Glory
15	MF	Sally Shipard	20 October 1987 (aged 22)			(Football Australia) Canberra United
16	MF	Elise Kellond-Knight	10 August 1990 (aged 19)			(Football Australia) Brisbane Roar
17	FW	Kyah Simon	25 June 1991 (aged 18)			(Football Australia) Sydney FC
18	GK	Lydia Williams	13 May 1988 (aged 22)			(Football Australia) Canberra United
19	FW	Leena Khamis	19 June 1986 (aged 23)			(Football Australia) Sydney FC
22	FW	Sam Kerr	10 September 1993 (aged 16)			(Football Australia) Perth Glory
23	DF	Kim Carroll	2 September 1987 (aged 22)			(Football Australia) Brisbane Roar
24	MF	Tameka Butt	16 June 1991 (aged 18)			(Football Australia) Brisbane Roar
25	GK	Casey Dumont	25 January 1992 (aged 18)			(Football Australia) Brisbane Roar
27	MF	Aivi Luik	18 March 1985 (aged 25)			(Football Australia) Brisbane Roar
31	DF	Teigen Allen	12 February 1994 (aged 16)			(Football Australia) Sydney FC

=== China ===
Coach: Shang Ruihua

The squad was announced on 4 May 2010.

No.	Pos.	Player	Date of birth (age)	Caps	Goals	Club
1	GK	Zhang Yanru	10 January 1987 (aged 23)			(Chinese Football Association) Jiangsu
2	DF	Liu Huana	17 May 1981 (aged 29)			(Chinese Football Association) Shaanxi
3	DF	Yuan Fan	6 November 1986 (aged 23)			(Chinese Football Association) Shanghai
4	DF	Jin Xiaomei	1 January 1983 (aged 27)			(Chinese Football Association) Shandong Sports Lottery
5	DF	Weng Xinzhi	15 June 1988 (aged 21)			(Chinese Football Association) Jiangsu
6	MF	Zhang Na	10 March 1984 (aged 26)			(Chinese Football Association) Hebei China Fortune
7	MF	Bi Yan	17 February 1984 (aged 26)			(Chinese Football Association) Dalian Shide
8	FW	Xu Yuan	17 November 1985 (aged 24)			(Chinese Football Association) Shanghai
9	FW	Han Duan	15 June 1983 (aged 26)			(Chinese Football Association) Dalian Shide
11	FW	You Jia	24 November 1987 (aged 22)			(Chinese Football Association) Shanghai
12	DF	Guan Jingjing	12 December 1985 (aged 24)			(Chinese Football Association) Jiangsu
13	FW	Ma Jun	6 March 1989 (aged 21)			(Chinese Football Association) Jiangsu
14	DF	Li Danyang	8 April 1990 (aged 20)			(Chinese Football Association) Dalian Shide
15	MF	Sun Ling	12 November 1985 (aged 24)			(Chinese Football Association) Shanghai
16	MF	Zhang Rui	17 January 1989 (aged 21)			(Chinese Football Association) Bayi
17	MF	Pang Fengyue	19 January 1989 (aged 21)			(Chinese Football Association) Dalian Shide
18	GK	Weng Xiaojie	27 July 1987 (aged 22)			(Chinese Football Association) Jiangsu
19	MF	Lou Jiahui	26 May 1991 (aged 18)			(Chinese Football Association) Henan Jianye
20	DF	Zhou Gaoping	20 October 1986 (aged 23)			(Chinese Football Association) Jiangsu
24	MF	Ma Zixiang	9 February 1988 (aged 22)			(Chinese Football Association) Beijing BG
26	MF	Li Ying	7 January 1993 (aged 17)			(Chinese Football Association) Hangzhou Xizi
28	GK	Zhang Yue	30 September 1990 (aged 19)			(Chinese Football Association) Beijing BG
35	MF	Li Dongna	6 December 1988 (aged 21)			(Chinese Football Association) Tianjin Huisen

=== South Korea ===
Coach: Lee Sang-yup

The squad was announced on 18 May 2010.

No.	Pos.	Player	Date of birth (age)	Caps	Goals	Club
1	GK	Jun Min-kyung	16 January 1985 (aged 25)			(Korea Football Association) Daekyo Kangaroos
3	DF	Yu Ji-eun	27 March 1983 (aged 27)			(Korea Football Association) Daekyo Kangaroos
6	FW	Jeon Ga-eul	14 September 1988 (aged 21)			(Korea Football Association) Suwon FMC
7	FW	Yoo Young-a	15 April 1988 (aged 22)			(Korea Football Association) Busan Sangmu
8	MF	Kim Hui-yeong	9 January 1982 (aged 28)			(Korea Football Association) Daekyo Kangaroos
10	MF	Ji So-yun	21 February 1991 (aged 19)			(Korea Football Association) Hanyang Women's University
12	DF	Choe Su-jin	27 June 1987 (aged 22)			(Korea Football Association) Chungnam Ilhwa Chunma
13	DF	Kim Do-yeon	7 December 1988 (aged 21)			(Korea Football Association) Seoul WFC
14	MF	Kwon Hah-nul	7 March 1988 (aged 22)			(Korea Football Association) Busan Sangmu
15	MF	Lee Jang-mi	14 November 1985 (aged 24)			(German Football Association) 1. FFC Frankfurt
16	MF	Lee Sea-eun	27 February 1989 (aged 21)			(Korea Football Association) Incheon Hyundai Steel Red Angels
18	GK	Kim Jung-mi	16 October 1984 (aged 25)			(Korea Football Association) Incheon Hyundai Steel Red Angels
19	FW	Choi Sun-jin	15 March 1987 (aged 23)			(Korea Football Association) Busan Sangmu
20	FW	Jung Hae-in	6 January 1990 (aged 20)			(Korea Football Association) Incheon Hyundai Steel Red Angels
21	GK	Kim Seu-ri	17 April 1988 (aged 22)			(Korea Football Association) Busan Sangmu
22	DF	Shin Sun-nam	30 May 1981 (aged 28)			(Korea Football Association) Incheon Hyundai Steel Red Angels
23	DF	Shim Seo-yeon	15 April 1989 (aged 21)			(Korea Football Association) Suwon FMC
24	DF	Cho So-hyun	24 June 1988 (aged 21)			(Korea Football Association) Suwon FMC
25	MF	Lee Eun-mi	18 August 1988 (aged 21)			(Korea Football Association) Daekyo Kangaroos
26	DF	Lim Seon-joo	27 November 1990 (aged 19)			(Korea Football Association) Hanyang Women's University
27	DF	Kang Sun-mi	14 March 1979 (aged 31)			(Korea Football Association) Daekyo Kangaroos
28	MF	Kim Soo-yun	30 August 1989 (aged 20)			(Korea Football Association) Chungnam Ilhwa Chunma
29	FW	Cha Yun-hee	26 February 1986 (aged 24)			(German Football Association) SC 07 Bad Neuenahr

=== Vietnam ===
Coach: Vũ Bá Đông

The squad was announced on 13 April 2010.

No.	Pos.	Player	Date of birth (age)	Caps	Goals	Club
1	GK	Đặng Thị Kiều Trinh	19 December 1985 (aged 24)			(Vietnam Football Federation) Hồ Chí Minh City I W.F.C.
3	DF	Nhiêu Thùy Linh	7 November 1993 (aged 16)			
4	MF	Nguyễn Thị Hạnh	20 September 1986 (aged 23)			
5	DF	Bùi Thị Như	16 June 1990 (aged 19)			
7	DF	Nguyễn Thị Nga	9 May 1985 (aged 25)			
8	DF	Đào Thị Miện	17 July 1981 (aged 28)			
10	MF	Nguyễn Thị Thành	20 November 1986 (aged 23)			
12	MF	Từ Thị Phụ	5 November 1984 (aged 25)			
13	MF	Nguyễn Thị Muôn	7 October 1988 (aged 21)			
14	MF	Đoàn Thị Kim Chi	29 April 1979 (aged 31)			
15	DF	Nguyễn Thị Ngọc Anh	23 February 1985 (aged 25)			
16	MF	Lê Thị Thương	23 December 1984 (aged 25)			
17	DF	Nguyễn Hải Hòa	22 December 1989 (aged 20)			
18	FW	Nguyễn Thị Minh Nguyệt	16 November 1986 (aged 23)			
19	FW	Lê Thị Oanh	9 February 1984 (aged 26)			
20	FW	Nguyễn Thị Nguyệt	5 November 1992 (aged 17)			
23	MF	Trần Thị Kim Hồng	26 January 1985 (aged 25)			
25	FW	Đỗ Thị Thu Trang	4 November 1983 (aged 26)			
27	GK	Dương Thị Danh	19 March 1987 (aged 23)			
28	MF	Nguyễn Thị Mai Ngọc	15 September 1989 (aged 20)			
29	DF	Bùi Thúy An	5 October 1990 (aged 19)			

== Player representation ==
Statistics are per the beginning of the competition.

=== By representatives of domestic league ===
National squad	Players
China	23
Thailand	23
North Korea	21
South Korea	21
Vietnam	21
Australia	20
Myanmar	20
Japan	18
