= 2010 in Chinese football =

Football in China
- Season: 2010

Men's football
- Super League: Shandong Luneng Taishan
- League One: Guangzhou Evergrande
- League Two: Dalian Aerbin

2010 in Chinese football involved the national competitions of the Chinese football league system and the national team.

== National teams competitions ==
=== Men's senior team ===
==== 2011 AFC Asian Cup qualification ====
Group D

Team	Pld	W	D	L	GF	GA	GD	Pts
Syria	6	4	2	0	10	2	+8	14
China	6	4	1	1	13	5	+8	13
Vietnam	6	1	2	3	6	11	−5	5
Lebanon	6	0	1	5	2	13	−11	1

	(China)	(Vietnam)	(Syria)	(Lebanon)
China		6–1	0–0	1–0
Vietnam	1–2		0–1	3–1
Syria	3–2	0–0		4–0
Lebanon	0–2	0–0	0–2	

6 January Group D	China	0–0	Syria	Hangzhou, China PR
19:30 UTC+8		Report		Stadium: Yellow Dragon Sports Center; Attendance: 29,570; Referee: Toma Maasaki (Japan)

17 January Group D	Vietnam	1–2	China	Hanoi, Vietnam
19:00 UTC+7	Le Cong Vinh 76' (pen.)	Report	Yang Xu 35'; Zhang Linpeng 43'	Stadium: Mỹ Đình National Stadium; Attendance: 3,000; Referee: Malik Abdul Bashir (Singapore)

==== EAFF Championship ====
Team	Pld	W	D	L	GF	GA	GD	Pts
China	3	2	1	0	5	0	+5	7
South Korea	3	2	0	1	8	4	+4	6
Japan	3	1	1	1	4	3	+1	4
Hong Kong	3	0	0	3	0	10	−10	0

6 February	Japan	0–0	China	Tokyo, Japan
19:15 UTC+9		Report		Stadium: Ajinomoto Stadium; Attendance: 25,964; Referee: Strebre Delovski (Australia)

10 February	China	3–0	South Korea	Tokyo, Japan
19:15 UTC+9	Yu Hai 5'; Gao Lin 27'; Deng Zhuoxiang 60'	Report		Stadium: Ajinomoto Stadium; Attendance: 3,629; Referee: Ng Kai Lam (Hong Kong)

14 February	China	2–0	Hong Kong	Tokyo, Japan
16:30 UTC+9	Qu Bo 44', 74' (pen.)	Report		Stadium: Olympic Stadium; Attendance: 16,439; Referee: Kim Jong-Hyeok (Korea Republic)

==== Friendly matches ====
3 March	Portugal	2–0	China	Coimbra, Portugal
20:45 UTC+0	Almeida 36'; Liédson 90+5'	Report		Stadium: Estádio Cidade de Coimbra; Attendance: 25,000; Referee: Djamel Haimoudi (Algeria)

19 May	China	3–0	(Germany) Bayer Leverkusen	Jiangyin, China PR
22:00 UTC+8	Yu Hanchao 49', 50'; Li Xuepeng 86'			Stadium: Jiangyin Stadium; Referee: Tao Rancheng (China)

4 June	France	0–1	China	Saint-Pierre, Réunion
20:00 UTC+4		Report	Deng Zhuoxiang 68'	Stadium: Stade Michel Volnay; Attendance: 8,000; Referee: Pedro Proença (Portugal)

26 June	China	4–0	Tajikistan	Kunming, China PR
16:00 UTC+8	Yan Xiangchuang 10'; Yu Hanchao 48', 77'; Qu Bo 61'			Stadium: Xingyao Sports Center; Referee: Wang Zhe (China)

11 August	China	1–1	Bahrain	Nanning, China PR
20:00 UTC+8	Yu Hai 10'		Abdullatif 17'	Stadium: Guangxi Sports Center; Attendance: 40,000; Referee: Song Wenfeng (China)

3 September	China	0–2	Iran	Zhengzhou, China PR
19:30 UTC+8			Teymourian 38'; Gholami 58'	Stadium: Hanghai Stadium; Attendance: 20,000; Referee: Kim Jong-Hyeok (Korea Republic)

7 September	China	1–1	Paraguay	Nanjing, China PR
19:30 UTC+8	Gao Lin 33'		Barrios 7'	Stadium: Nanjing Olympic Sports Center; Referee: Wang Di (China)

8 October	China	2–1	Syria	Kunming, China PR
19:30 UTC+8	Zhao Peng 37'; Zhang Linpeng 49' (pen.)		Al Hussain 59'	Stadium: Tuodong Stadium; Referee: Tao Rancheng (China)

12 October	China	0–4	Uruguay	Wuhan, China PR
19:30 UTC+8			Feng Xiaoting 70' (o.g.); Cavani 78'; Rodríguez 81'; Fernández 84'	Stadium: Wuhan Sports Center Stadium; Referee: Lee Dong-Jun (Korea Republic)

17 November	China	1–0	Latvia	Kunming, China PR
19:00 UTC+8	Yang Xu 90+3'	Report		Stadium: Tuodong Stadium; Attendance: 15,000; Referee: Ko Hyung-Jin (Korea Republic)

18 December	China	3–0	Estonia	Zhuhai, China PR
15:00 UTC+8	Du Wei 17'; Yu Hai 19'; Yang Xu 38'	Report		Stadium: Zhuhai Sports Center; Attendance: 8,500; Referee: Ko Hyung-Jin (Korea Republic)

22 December	China	1–0	North Macedonia	Guangzhou, China PR
19:30 UTC+8	Deng Zhuoxiang 90+4' (pen.)			Stadium: Yuexiushan Stadium; Referee: Kim Jong-Hyeok (Korea Republic); Assistant referees: Mu Yuxin (China PR); Alamus (China PR)

=== Women's senior team ===
==== Women's EAFF Championship ====
The final competition was held in Tokyo, Japan in February 2010. The North Korean women's team withdrew from the tournament in January 2010, and were replaced by the Chinese Taipei side, the runners-up from the semi-final tournament.

Team	Pld	W	D	L	GF	GA	GD	Pts
Japan	3	3	0	0	7	1	+6	9
China	3	2	0	1	5	3	+2	6
South Korea	3	1	0	2	6	4	+2	3
Chinese Taipei	3	0	0	3	0	10	−10	0

6 February	Japan	2–0	China	Tokyo, Japan
15:30 UTC+9	Miyama 19'; Kinga 61'	Report		Stadium: Ajinomoto Stadium; Attendance: 7,459; Referee: Pannipar Kamnueng (Thailand)

10 February	China	2–1	South Korea	Tokyo, Japan
16:30 UTC+9	Ma Xiaoxu 51'; Yuan Fan 63'	Report	Ji So-Yeon 85'	Stadium: Ajinomoto Stadium; Attendance: 714; Referee: Pannipar Kamnueng (Thailand)

13 February	China	3–0	Chinese Taipei	Tokyo, Japan
13:00 UTC+9	Han Duan 46', 60'; Pang Fengyue 75'	Report		Stadium: Ajinomoto Stadium; Attendance: 728; Referee: Etsuko Fukano (Japan)

==== 2010 Algarve Cup ====
Group A

Team	Pts	Pld	W	D	L	GF	GA	GD
Germany	9	3	3	0	0	16	0	+16
China	4	3	1	1	1	3	6	−3
Denmark	3	3	1	0	2	2	7	−5
Finland	1	3	0	1	2	2	10	−8

24 February Group A	China	1–1	Finland	Lagos, Portugal
15:00 UTC+0	Han Duan 7'		Sällström 54'	Stadium: Municipal Stadium; Referee: Quetzalli Alvarado Godinez (Mexico)

26 February Group A	China	2–0	Denmark	Lagos, Portugal
15:00 UTC+0	Xu Yuan 12', 25'			Stadium: Municipal Stadium; Referee: Silvia Reyes Juarez (Peru)

1 March Group A	China	0–5	Germany	Faro, Portugal
17:00 UTC+0			Garefrekes 2'; Mittag 16', 42'; Peter 75'; Zietz 90'	Stadium: Estádio Algarve; Referee: Quetzalli Alvarado Godinez (Mexico)

3 March third place match	China	0–2	Sweden	Albufeira, Portugal
11:00 UTC+0			Dahlkvist 13'; Fischer 68'	Stadium: Municipal Stadium; Referee: Michelle Pye (Canada)

==== 2010 AFC Women's Asian Cup ====
Group B

Team	Pld	W	D	L	GF	GA	GD	Pts
China	3	2	1	0	6	0	+6	7
Australia	3	2	0	1	5	2	+3	6
South Korea	3	1	1	1	6	3	+3	4
Vietnam	3	0	0	3	0	12	−12	0

19 May Group B	China	0–0	South Korea	Chengdu, China PR
19:30 UTC+8		Report		Stadium: Chengdu Sports Center; Attendance: 15,000; Referee: Pannipar Kamnueng (Thailand)

21 May Group B	China	5–0	Vietnam	Chengdu, China PR
19:30 UTC+8	Li Danyang 8'; Yuan Fan 12'; Zhang Rui 37'; Bi Yan 45+1' (pen.); Han Duan 51'	Report		Stadium: Chengdu Sports Center; Attendance: 8,500; Referee: Semaksuk Praew (Thailand)

23 May Group B	China	1–0	Australia	Chengdu, China PR
16:00 UTC+8	Zhang Rui 9'	Report		Stadium: Chengdu Sports Center; Attendance: 11,000; Referee: Sachiko Yamagishi (Japan)

27 May Semi finals	China	0 – 1 (a.e.t.)	North Korea	Chengdu, China PR
19:30 UTC+8		Report	Kim Kyong-Hwa 109'	Stadium: Chengdu Sports Center; Attendance: 12,500; Referee: Semaksuk Praew (Thailand)

30 May Third place playoff	China	0–2	Japan	Chengdu, China PR
16:00 UTC+8		Report	Ando 18'; Sawa 62'	Stadium: Chengdu Sports Center; Attendance: 5,800; Referee: Hong Eun-Ah (South Korea)

==== 2010 Asian Games ====
Group A

Team	Pld	W	D	L	GF	GA	GD	Pts
South Korea	3	2	1	0	11	1	+10	7
China	3	2	1	0	11	1	+10	7
Vietnam	3	1	0	2	4	7	−3	3
Jordan	3	0	0	3	1	18	−17	0

Note: China PR and Korea Republic finished with identical records. With both teams facing each other in the final group match, a penalty shootout was taken place on the spot to determine the group winner. Korea Republic won 8–7 on penalties.

14 November Group A	China	10–1	Jordan	Guangzhou, China PR
19:00 (UCT+8)	Ma Jun 7', 44'; Qu Shanshan 13', 17'; Xu Yuan 14', 84'; Li Lin 39', 46'; Liu Huana 54'; Pang Fengyue 90'	Report	Jbrarah 19'	Stadium: University City Stadium; Referee: Pannipar Kamnueng (Thailand)

16 November Group A	China	1–0	Vietnam	Guangzhou, China PR
19:00 (UCT+8)	Qu Shanshan 87'	Report		Stadium: University City Stadium; Referee: Ri Hyang-Ok (North Korea)

18 November Group A	China	0–0 (7–8 p)	South Korea	Guangzhou, China PR
19:00 (UCT+8)		Report		Stadium: University City Stadium; Referee: Sachiko Yamagishi (Japan)
	Penalties
	Zhang Yue (penalty scored); Weng Xinzhi (penalty scored); Xu Yuan (penalty scored); Pang Fengyue (penalty missed); Liu Huana (penalty scored); Yuan Fan (penalty scored); Wang Yihang (penalty scored); Zhou Gaoping (penalty scored); Qu Shanshan (penalty missed)		Kim Do-yeon (penalty scored); Kim Na-Rae (penalty scored); Jeon Ga-Eul (penalty scored); Yoo Ji-Eun (penalty missed); Ji So-Yun (penalty scored); Lee Eun-Mi (penalty scored); Kwon Hah-Nul (penalty scored); Hong Kyung-Suk (penalty scored); Yoo Young-A (penalty scored)

Both teams ended the group stage with equal points, goal difference and goal scored. A penalty shootout was therefore taken immediately after the 90-minute match to determine the group winner in which Korea Republic won.

20 November Semi finals	China	0 – 1 (a.e.t.)	Japan	Guangzhou, China PR
16:00 (UCT+8)		Report	Ohno 108'	Stadium: Yuexiushan Stadium; Referee: Hong Eun-Ah (Korea Republic)

22 November Bronze medal match	China	0–2	South Korea	Guangzhou, China PR
15:30 (UCT+8)		Report	Park Hee-young 2'; Ji So-Yun 37'	Stadium: Tianhe Stadium; Referee: Mai Hoang Trang (Vietnam)

==== Friendly matches ====
13 January	China	1–0	Norway	Alicante, Spain
18:00 UTC+1	Han Duan 59'

14 January	China	1–3	(France) Olympique Lyonnais	Alicante, Spain
UTC+1

15 January	China	2–2	England	Alicante, Spain
12:00 UTC+1

16 January	China	3–1	Norway	Alicante, Spain
UTC+1

24 April	China	2–0	Canada	Chongqing, China PR
UTC+8	Han Duan 17'; Marton 65' (o.g.)			Stadium: Yongchuan Sports Center; Attendance: 23,000

30 September	Canada	3–1	China	Toronto, Ontario, Canada
19:30 EDT/UTC-4	Matheson 23'; Tancredi 65'; Sinclair 68'	Report	Zhang Na 42'	Stadium: BMO Field; Attendance: 5,427

2 October	United States	2–1	China	Kennesaw, Georgia, United States
18:00 EDT/UTC-4	Rapinoe 21'; O'Reilly 37'	Report	Qu Shanshan 33'	Stadium: KSU Soccer Stadium; Attendance: 4,759; Referee: Meredith Hackett (USA); Assistant referees: Melanie Johnson (USA); Patrick Baker (USA); Fourth official: Amy Mahan (USA)

6 October	United States	1–1	China	Chester, Pennsylvania, United States
19:00 EDT/UTC-4	Morgan 83'	Report	Ma Jun 37'	Stadium: PPL Park; Attendance: 2,505; Referee: Margaret Domka (USA); Assistant referees: Deborah Coleman (USA); Ross Kleinstauber (USA); Fourth official: Emilie Buse (USA)

=== Men's U-23 team ===
==== 2010 Asian Games ====
Group A

Team	Pld	W	D	L	GF	GA	GD	Pts
Japan	3	3	0	0	8	0	+8	9
China	3	2	0	1	5	4	+1	6
Malaysia	3	1	0	2	2	6	−4	3
Kyrgyzstan	3	0	0	3	2	7	−5	0

8 November Group A	China	0–3	Japan	Guangzhou, China PR
19:00 UCT+8		Report	Yamazaki 11'; Nagai 58'; Suzuki 64'	Stadium: Tianhe Stadium; Referee: Valentin Kovalenko (Uzbekistan)

10 November Group A	China	2–1	Kyrgyzstan	Guangzhou, China PR
19:00 UCT+8	Lü Wenjun 84'; Wu Xi 90+4'	Report	Sidorenko 5'	Stadium: Tianhe Stadium; Referee: Ali Shaban (Kuwait)

13 November Group A	China	3–0	Malaysia	Guangzhou, China PR
19:00 UCT+8	Li Kai 61'; Zhao Honglue 65'; Zhang Linpeng 83' (pen.)	Report		Stadium: Tianhe Stadium; Referee: Ben Williams (Australia)

15 November Round of 16	China	0–3	South Korea	Guangzhou, China PR
19:00 UCT+8		Report	Kim Jung-Woo 19'; Park Chu-Young 49'; Cho Young-Cheol 58'	Stadium: Tianhe Stadium; Referee: Saeid Mozaffabi (Iran)

==== Friendly matches ====
26 January	Portugal	1–2	China	Portugal
UTC+0

16 May	China	1–6	(Germany) Bayer Leverkusen	Foshan, China PR
18:00 UTC+8	Tan Yang 80'		Bender 12'; Helmes 20', 22', 53'; Castro 34'; Friedrich 50'	Stadium: Century Lotus Stadium; Referee: He Zhibiao (China)

12 June	China	2–0	(China) Liaoning Whowin	Shenyang, China PR
15:00 UTC+8	Yang Boyu 49'; Lü Wenjun 70'			Stadium: Tiexi People's Stadium

16 June	China	0–2	(China) Changchun Yatai	Changchun, China PR
15:30 UTC+8			Steer 40'; Lü Jianjun 77'	Stadium: Economics Development Area Stadium

23 June	China	1–2	(China) Hunan Billows	Changsha, China PR
19:30 UTC+8	Qiu Tianyi 73'		Neto 84'; Liu Yusheng 87'	Stadium: Helong Stadium

27 June	China	1–0	(China) Henan Construction	Zhengzhou, China PR
19:45 UTC+8	Wang Gang 49'			Stadium: Hanghai Stadium

3 July	China	0–0 (3–2 p)	(China) Dalian Shide	Dalian, China PR
15:00 UTC+8				Stadium: Jinzhou Stadium
	Penalties
	Zhang Linpeng (penalty scored); Jiang Zhe (penalty scored); Zhang Jian (penalty scored); Dong Xuesheng (penalty missed)		Quan Lei (penalty scored); Chamanga (penalty scored); Zhang Yaokun (penalty missed); Veselinović (penalty missed); Li Xuepeng (penalty missed)

7 July	China	2–3	(China) Qingdao Jonoon	Qingdao, China PR
19:30 UTC+8	Zhang Jian 1', 70'		Rodić 5', 24' (pen.); Wei Renjie 47'	Stadium: Tiantai Stadium

4 September	China	1–2	(China) Shandong Luneng	Jinan, China PR
15:30 UTC+8	Hui Jiakang 48'		Yuan Weiwei 35'; Liu Zhao 53'	Stadium: Shandong Stadium

8 September	China	1–0	(China) Beijing Guoan	Beijing, China PR
19:30 UTC+8	Wu Hao 66' (o.g.)			Stadium: Shijingshan Stadium

1 October	China	3–1	(China) Chongqing Lifan	Chongqing, China PR
15:30 UTC+8	Zhou Liao 78'; Lü Wenjun 79'; Zheng Zheng 87'		Zhang Li 47'	Stadium: Olympic Sports Center

6 October	China	1–1 (4–3 p)	(China) Nanchang Hengyuan	Nanchang, China PR
15:00 UTC+8	Li Kai 38'		Zou Zhongting 40'	Stadium: Bayi Stadium
	Penalties
	(penalty missed) (penalty missed); Zheng Zheng (penalty scored); Zhou Liao (penalty scored); Piao Cheng (penalty scored); Song Long (penalty scored)		Chen Zhizhao (penalty scored); Beto (penalty missed); Jiao Fengbo (penalty missed); Yang Chen (penalty scored); Zheng Kewei (penalty scored); Sun Yifan (penalty missed)

=== Men's U-20 team ===
==== 2010 AFC U-19 Championship ====
Group A

Team	Pld	W	D	L	GF	GA	GD	Pts
China	3	2	1	0	6	2	+4	7
Saudi Arabia	3	2	0	1	3	3	0	6
Syria	3	1	0	2	1	3	−2	3
Thailand	3	0	1	2	1	3	−2	1

3 October Group A	China	3–1	Saudi Arabia	Zibo, China PR
14:30 UCT+8	Tan Tiancheng 3'; Wu Lei 14', 65'	Report	Majrashi 9'	Stadium: Zibo Sports Stadium; Attendance: 31,000; Referee: (Australia) Peter Green

5 October Group A	Syria	0–2	China	Zibo, China PR
14:30 UCT+8		Report	Jin Jingdao 4', 90+4'	Stadium: Zibo Sports Stadium; Attendance: 23,000; Referee: (Singapore) Abdul Bashir

7 October Group A	China	1–1	Thailand	Zibo, China PR
14:30 14:30 UCT+8	Zhu Jianrong 75'	Report	Pattana 35'	Stadium: Zibo Sports Stadium; Attendance: 23,000; Referee: (Oman) Al Masoud

11 October Quarter-finals	China	0–2	North Korea	Zibo, China PR
14:30 UCT+8		Report	Jong Il-Gwan 51'; Pak Song-Chol 53'	Stadium: Zibo Sports Stadium; Attendance: 30,000; Referee: (Lebanon) Andre El Haddad

==== Friendly matches ====
10 April	Dynamos F.C. (Zimbabwe)	1–0	China	Harare, Zimbabwe
				Stadium: National Sports Stadium

27 June	China	1–0	Japan	Weifang, China PR
19:30 UTC+8	Sugimoto 55' (o.g.)			Stadium: Weifang Olympic Park

29 June	China	1–2	Japan	Weifang, China PR
19:30 UTC+8				Stadium: Weifang Olympic Park

23 September	China	3–0	Bahrain	Taian, China PR

25 September	China	0–1	United Arab Emirates	Jinan, China PR

==== 2010 Milk Cup ====
26 July Group Stage	China	0–3	United States	Ballymoney, Northern Ireland
20:00 UCT+0				Stadium: Ballymena Showgrounds

28 July Group Stage	China	0–5	Northern Ireland	Ballymoney, Northern Ireland
20:00 UCT+0				Stadium: Riada Stadium

30 July 5th Place Playoff	China	0–3	Japan	Ballymoney, Northern Ireland
11:00 UCT+0				Stadium: Riada Stadium

==== 2010 Weifang Cup ====
7 August Group Stage	China	4–1	(Australia) Perth Glory Youth	Weifang, China PR

8 August Group Stage	China	0–0	United Arab Emirates	Weifang, China PR

10 August Group Stage	China	3–0	(South Korea) High School Selection	Weifang, China PR

11 August Semifinals	China	2–0	(Poland) Zagłębie Lubin Youth	Weifang, China PR

13 August Final	China	3–1	(China) Tianjin Teda Youth	Weifang, China PR

==== 2010 Sendai Cup ====
9 September	China	1–4	Brazil	Sendai, Japan

11 September	China	1–2	France	Sendai, Japan

13 September	China	0–4	Japan	Sendai, Japan

=== Men's U-17 team ===
==== 2010 AFC U-16 Championship ====
Group D

Team	Pld	W	D	L	GF	GA	GD	Pts
Iraq	3	2	0	1	6	2	+4	6
United Arab Emirates	3	1	2	0	3	2	+1	5
Kuwait	3	1	1	1	1	3	−2	4
China	3	0	1	2	1	4	−3	1

25 October Group D	China	0–2	Iraq	Tashkent, Uzbekistan
13:00 UTC+5		Report	Fendi 5'; Al-Fuadi 39' (pen.)	Stadium: JAR Stadium; Attendance: 4,700; Referee: (Qatar) Abdullah Balideh

27 October Group D	China	1–1	United Arab Emirates	Tashkent, Uzbekistan
17:00 UTC+5	D. L. Zheng 75'	Report	Al-Hammadi 74'	Stadium: JAR Stadium; Attendance: 2,000; Referee: (Japan) Kenji Ogiya

29 October Group D	China	0–1	Kuwait	Tashkent, Uzbekistan
17:00 UTC+5		Report	Al-Enezi 73'	Stadium: JAR Stadium; Attendance: 1,500; Referee: (Uzbekistan) Vladislav Tseytlin

==== AEGON Future Cup ====
Group A

Team	Pld	W	D	L	GF	GA	GD	Pts
(Netherlands) AFC Ajax U17	3	3	0	0	7	0	+7	9
China	3	1	1	1	1	4	−3	4
(England) Liverpool FC U17	3	1	0	2	1	2	−1	3
(Spain) FC Barcelona U17	3	0	1	2	0	3	−3	1

3 April Group A	China	0–0	(Spain) FC Barcelona U17	Amsterdam, Netherlands
16:00

4 April Group A	China	0–4	(Netherlands) AFC Ajax U17	Amsterdam, Netherlands
13:30

4 April Group A	China	1–0	(England) Liverpool FC U17	Amsterdam, Netherlands
16:30

5 April Semi-final	China	1–0	(Germany) FC Bayern Munich U17	Amsterdam, Netherlands
12:00

5 April Final	China	0–1	(Netherlands) AFC Ajax U17	Amsterdam, Netherlands
15:00			Ondaan

=== Women's U-20 team ===
==== International tournament in Russia ====
Group B

Team	Pld	W	D	L	GF	GA	GD	Pts
China	3	3	0	0	11	1	+10	9
Turkey	3	2	0	1	12	2	+10	6
(Russia) Ural	3	1	0	2	5	11	−6	3
(Russia) Region Ug	3	0	0	3	1	15	−14	0

6 March Group B	China	6–1	(Russia) Ural	Sochi, Russia

8 March Group B	China	1–0	Turkey	Sochi, Russia

10 March Group B	China	4–0	(Russia) Region Ug	Sochi, Russia

12 March Quarter-finals	China	2–0	(Russia) Krasnodar Region	Sochi, Russia

14 March Semi-final	China	3–0	Turkey	Sochi, Russia

16 March Final	China	2–0	Russia	Sochi, Russia

== Domestic competitions ==
=== Chinese Super League ===
Pos	Team	Pld	W	D	L	GF	GA	GD	Pts	Qualification or relegation
1	Shandong Luneng (C)	30	18	9	3	59	34	+25	63	AFC Champions League Group stage
2	Tianjin TEDA	30	13	11	6	37	29	+8	50	AFC Champions League Group stage
3	Shanghai Shenhua	30	14	6	10	44	41	+3	48 (Note: Shanghai: 4 pts, 3–2; Hangzhou: 1 pt, 2–3)	AFC Champions League Group stage
4	Hangzhou Greentown	30	13	9	8	38	30	+8	48	AFC Champions League Group stage
5	Beijing Guoan	30	12	10	8	35	29	+6	46	
6	Dalian Shide	30	10	12	8	40	37	+3	42	
7	Liaoning Whowin	30	10	10	10	39	36	+3	40 (Note: Liaoning: 4 pts, 3–1; Henan: 1 pt, 1–3)	
8	Henan Jianye	30	9	13	8	31	31	0	40	
9	Changchun Yatai	30	10	8	12	40	41	−1	38	
10	Shaanxi Chanba	30	9	10	11	33	36	−3	37	
11	Jiangsu Sainty	30	8	11	11	27	27	0	35	
12	Shenzhen Ruby	30	8	8	14	34	41	−7	32 (Note: Shenzhen: 6 pts, 2–0; Nanchang: 0 pt, 0–2)	
13	Nanchang Hengyuan	30	8	8	14	33	35	−2	32	
14	Qingdao Jonoon	30	6	12	12	31	44	−13	30 (Note: Qingdao: 8 pts, 7–4; Chongqing: 5 pts, 6–5; Changsha: 2 pts, 4–8)	
15	Chongqing Lifan (R)	30	7	9	14	36	48	−12	30	Relegation to China League One
16	Changsha Ginde (R)	30	6	12	12	24	42	−18	30	Relegation to China League One

Rules for classification: 1st points; 2nd head-to-head points; 3rd head-to-head goal difference; 4th head-to-head goals scored; 5th goal difference; 6th goals scored; 7th disciplinary points (1 point for each yellow card, 3 points for each red card). Head-to-Head: used when head-to-head record is used to rank tied teams.
(C) Champions; (R) Relegated

=== China League One ===
Pos	Team	Pld	W	D	L	GF	GA	GD	Pts	Promotion or relegation
1	Guangzhou Evergrande (C, P)	24	17	6	1	61	21	+40	57	Promotion to Chinese Super League
2	Chengdu Blades (P)	24	17	5	2	56	15	+41	56	Promotion to Chinese Super League
3	Yanbian	24	12	4	8	30	21	+9	40	
4	Shanghai East Asia	24	9	10	5	25	18	+7	37 (Note: Shanghai, 4 pts; Hubei, 1 pt)	
5	Hubei Luyin	24	10	7	7	30	24	+6	37	
6	Hunan Billows	24	10	5	9	21	24	−3	35	
7	Shenyang Dongjin	24	6	12	6	23	23	0	30	
8	Beijing Baxy&Shengshi	24	10	4	10	24	24	0	28 (Note: Beijing Baxy&Shengshi were given a 6-point deduction for late payment of wages.)	
9	Anhui Jiufang	24	7	3	14	17	36	−19	24	
10	Shanghai Zobon	24	5	8	11	22	37	−15	23	
11	Guangdong Sunray Cave	24	5	7	12	34	39	−5	22	
12	Beijing BIT	24	4	6	14	22	40	−18	18	
13	Nanjing Yoyo (R)	24	3	5	16	19	62	−43	14	Disbanded after season

Updated to match(es) played on 30 October 2010. Source: League One table
Rules for classification: 1st points; 2nd head-to-head points; 3rd head-to-head goal difference; 4th head-to-head goals scored; 5th goal difference; 6th goals scored; 7th disciplinary points (1 point for each yellow card, 3 points for each red card.)
(C) Champions; (P) Promoted; (R) Relegated

=== China League Two ===
==== North Division ====
Pos	Team	Pld	W	D	L	GF	GA	GD	Pts	Qualification
1	Dalian Aerbin (Q, C, P)	16	11	1	4	29	11	+18	34	Play-off semi-finals
2	Dalian Yiteng (Q)	16	8	3	5	23	17	+6	27	Play-off first round
3	Tianjin Huochetou (Q)	16	6	2	8	15	17	−2	20	Play-off first round
4	Liaoning Tiger	16	4	6	6	12	23	−11	18	
5	Panjin Mengzun	16	4	2	10	14	25	−11	14	

==== South Division ====
Pos	Team	Pld	W	D	L	GF	GA	GD	Pts	Qualification
1	Tianjin Songjiang (Q, C, P)	16	10	5	1	30	9	+21	35	Play-off semi-finals
2	Guizhou Zhicheng (Q)	16	4	9	3	16	12	+4	21	Play-off first round
3	Hubei CTGU Kangtian (Q)	16	3	9	4	13	17	−4	18	Play-off first round
4	Sichuan F.C.	16	3	8	5	12	17	−5	17	
5	Wenzhou Provenza	16	1	7	8	13	29	−16	10	

==== Playoffs ====
First round

Team 1	Agg.	Team 2	1st leg	2nd leg
Dalian Yiteng	3–2	Hubei CTGU Kangtian	3–2	0–0
Guizhou Zhicheng	3–0	Tianjin Huochetou	1–0	2–0

Semi-finals / Promotion finals

Team 1	Agg.	Team 2	1st leg	2nd leg
Dalian Aerbin	3–1	Guizhou Zhicheng	3–1	0–0
Tianjin Songjiang	2–1	Dalian Yiteng	0–0	2–1

Champions final

1 December	Dalian Aerbin	2–0	Tianjin Songjiang	Chongqing
	Guo Hui 12'; Hou Zhe 66'			Stadium: Olympic Sports Center

== International clubs competitions ==
=== AFC Champions League ===
==== Group E ====
Team	Pld	W	D	L	GF	GA	GD	Pts
(South Korea) Seongnam Ilhwa Chunma	6	5	0	1	11	6	+5	15
(China) Beijing Guoan	6	3	1	2	7	5	+2	10
(Japan) Kawasaki Frontale	6	2	0	4	8	8	0	6
(Australia) Melbourne Victory	6	1	1	4	3	10	−7	4

	BEI	KAW	MEL	SEO
Beijing Guoan		2–0	1–0	0–1
Kawasaki Frontale	1–3		4–0	3–0
Melbourne Victory	0–0	1–0		0–2
Seongnam Ilhwa Chunma	3–1	2–0	3–2	

==== Group F ====
Team	Pld	W	D	L	GF	GA	GD	Pts
(Japan) Kashima Antlers	6	6	0	0	14	3	+11	18
(South Korea) Jeonbuk Hyundai Motors	6	4	0	2	17	6	+11	12
(China) Changchun Yatai	6	1	0	5	10	7	+3	3
(Indonesia) Persipura Jayapura	6	1	0	5	4	29	−25	3

	CHA	JEO	KAS	JAY
Changchun Yatai		1–2	0–1	9–0
Jeonbuk Hyundai Motors	1–0		1–2	8–0
Kashima Antlers	1–0	2–1		5–0
Persipura Jayapura	2–0	1–4	1–3	

==== Group G ====
Team	Pld	W	D	L	GF	GA	GD	Pts
(South Korea) Suwon Bluewings	6	4	1	1	13	4	+9	13
(Japan) Gamba Osaka	6	3	3	0	11	5	+6	12
Singapore Armed Forces	6	1	1	4	6	16	−10	4
(China) Henan Construction	6	0	3	3	3	8	−5	3

	OSA	HEN	SAF	SUW
Gamba Osaka		1–1	3–0	2–1
Henan Construction	1–1		0–0	0–2
Singapore Armed Forces	2–4	2–1		0–2
Suwon Bluewings	0–0	2–0	6–2	

==== Group H ====
Team	Pld	W	D	L	GF	GA	GD	Pts
(Australia) Adelaide United	6	3	1	2	6	4	+2	10
(South Korea) Pohang Steelers	6	3	1	2	8	7	+1	10
(Japan) Sanfrecce Hiroshima	6	3	0	3	11	11	0	9
(China) Shandong Luneng	6	2	0	4	5	8	−3	6

	ADE	POH	HIR	SHA
Adelaide United		1–0	3–2	0–1
Pohang Steelers	0–0		2–1	1–0
Sanfrecce Hiroshima	1–0	4–3		0–1
Shandong Luneng	0–2	1–2	2–3	

==== Round of 16 ====
11 May	Suwon Samsung Bluewings (South Korea)	2–0	(China) Beijing Guoan	Suwon, Korea Republic
19:30 (UTC+9)	José Mota 27', 86'	Report		Stadium: Suwon World Cup Stadium; Attendance: 5,693; Referee: Ali Hamad Al-Badwawi (UAE)
