= Football at the 2010 Asian Games – Women's tournament =

2010 Women's Asian Games Football Tournament
Tournament details
- Host country: China
- Dates: 14–22 November
- Teams: 7
- Venues: 4 (in 1 host city)

Final positions
- Champions: Japan (1st title)
- Runners-up: North Korea
- Third place: South Korea
- Fourth place: China

Tournament statistics
- Matches played: 13
- Goals scored: 41 (3.15 per match)
- Attendance: 238,266 (18,328 per match)
- Top scorer: (South Korea) Ji So-yun (5 goals)

The Women's football tournament at the 2010 Asian Games was held in Guangzhou in China from 8 November to 25 November.

== Venues ==
Guangzhou
Tianhe	Panyu	Yuexiu	Huangpu
Tianhe Stadium	University Town Stadium	Yuexiushan Stadium	Huangpu Sports Center Stadium
Capacity: 56,000	Capacity: 50,000	Capacity: 30,000	Capacity: 10,000
Map of Guangdong with 2010 Football of Asian Games venues marked.

== Results ==
All times are China Standard Time (UTC+08:00)

=== Pool matches ===
==== Group A ====
Pos	Team	Pld	W	D	L	GF	GA	GD	Pts
1	South Korea	3	2	1	0	11	1	+10	7
2	China	3	2	1	0	11	1	+10	7
3	Vietnam	3	1	0	2	4	7	−3	3
4	Jordan	3	0	0	3	1	18	−17	0

Source: RSSSF
14 November
16:00

South Korea	6–1	Vietnam
Ji So-yun 7'; Park Hee-young 14', 72' (pen.); Nhiêu Thùy Linh 27' (o.g.); Kwon Hah-nul 29', 77'		Nguyễn Thị Muôn 1'

University Town Stadium, Guangzhou
Attendance: 23,600
Referee: Sachiko Yamagishi (Japan)

14 November
19:00

China	10–1	Jordan
Ma Jun 7', 44'; Qu Shanshan 13', 17'; Xu Yuan 14', 84'; Li Lin 39', 46'; Liu Huana 54'; Pang Fengyue 90'		Jbarah 19'

University Town Stadium, Guangzhou
Attendance: 23,600
Referee: Pannipar Kamnueng (Thailand)

16 November
16:00

Jordan	0–5	South Korea
		Ji So-yun 4', 32' (pen.), 76'; Kwon Eun-som 39'; Yoo Young-a 66'

University Town Stadium, Guangzhou
Attendance: 14,360
Referee: Jacqui Melksham (Australia)

16 November
19:00

China	1–0	Vietnam
Qu Shanshan 87'

University Town Stadium, Guangzhou
Attendance: 14,360
Referee: Ri Hyang-ok (North Korea)

18 November
19:00

Vietnam	3–0	Jordan
Nguyễn Thị Hòa 10', 60'; Nguyễn Thị Muôn 35'

Huangpu Sports Center Stadium, Guangzhou
Attendance: 8,045
Referee: Abirami Naidu (Singapore)

18 November
19:00

China	0–0	South Korea
Penalties
Zhang Yue (penalty scored); Weng Xinzhi (penalty scored); Xu Yuan (penalty scored); Pang Fengyue (penalty missed); Liu Huana (penalty scored); Yuan Fan (penalty scored); Wang Yihang (penalty scored); Zhou Gaoping (penalty scored); Qu Shanshan (penalty missed)	7–8	(penalty scored) Kim Do-yeon; (penalty scored) Kim Na-rae; (penalty scored) Jeon Ga-eul; (penalty missed) Yu Ji-eun; (penalty scored) Ji So-yun; (penalty scored) Lee Eun-mi; (penalty scored) Kwon Hah-nul; (penalty scored) Hong Kyung-suk; (penalty scored) Yoo Young-a

University Town Stadium, Guangzhou
Attendance: 15,421
Referee: Sachiko Yamagishi (Japan)
- Both teams ended the group stage with equal points, goal difference and goal scored. A penalty shootout was therefore taken immediately after the 90-minute match to determine the group winner in which South Korea won.

==== Group B ====
Pos	Team	Pld	W	D	L	GF	GA	GD	Pts
1	Japan	2	1	1	0	4	0	+4	4
2	North Korea	2	1	1	0	2	0	+2	4
3	Thailand	2	0	0	2	0	6	−6	0

Source: RSSSF
14 November
19:00

Thailand	0–4	Japan
		Kitamoto 24'; Ono 35'; Sakaguchi 60'; Wiwasukhu 86' (o.g.)

Huangpu Sports Center Stadium, Guangzhou
Attendance: 6,600
Referee: Hong Eun-ah (South Korea)

16 November
19:00

Thailand	0–2	North Korea
		Jong Pok-sim 34' (pen.); Ra Un-sim 58'

Huangpu Sports Center Stadium, Guangzhou
Attendance: 2,580
Referee: Mai Hoàng Trang (Vietnam)

18 November
16:00

Japan	0–0	North Korea

University Town Stadium, Guangzhou
Attendance: 26,000
Referee: Wang Jia (China)

=== Knockout round ===
Semifinals
20 November
South Korea	1
North Korea (a.e.t.)	3
20 November
Japan (a.e.t.)	1
China	0

Final
22 November
North Korea	0
Japan	1
Bronze medal match
22 November
South Korea	2
China	0

==== Semifinals ====
20 November
16:00

Japan	1–0 (a.e.t.)	China
Ono 108'

Yuexiushan Stadium, Guangzhou
Attendance: 15,000
Referee: Hong Eun-ah (South Korea)

20 November
19:00

South Korea	1–3 (a.e.t.)	North Korea
Yoo Young-a 88'		Jo Yun-mi 45+1'; Ra Un-sim 94', 119'

Tianhe Stadium, Guangzhou
Attendance: 36,700
Referee: Jacqui Melksham (Australia)

==== Bronze medal match ====
22 November
15:30

(bronze) South Korea	2–0	China
Park Hee-young 2'; Ji So-yun 37'

Tianhe Stadium, Guangzhou
Attendance: 28,700
Referee: Mai Hoàng Trang (Vietnam)

==== Gold medal match ====
22 November
19:00

(silver) North Korea	0–1	Japan (gold)
		Iwashimizu 73'

Tianhe Stadium, Guangzhou
Attendance: 23,300
Referee: Pannipar Kamnueng (Thailand)

== Goalscorers ==
5 goals

- Ji So-yun (KOR)

3 goals

- Qu Shanshan (CHN)
- Park Hee-young (KOR)
- Ra Un-sim (PRK)

2 goals

- Li Lin (CHN)
- Ma Jun (CHN)
- Xu Yuan (CHN)
- Shinobu Ono (JPN)
- Kwon Hah-nul (KOR)
- Yoo Young-a (KOR)
- Nguyễn Thị Hòa (VIE)
- Nguyễn Thị Muôn (VIE)

1 goal

- Liu Huana (CHN)
- Pang Fengyue (CHN)
- Maysa Jbarah (JOR)
- Azusa Iwashimizu (JPN)
- Ayako Kitamoto (JPN)
- Mizuho Sakaguchi (JPN)
- Kwon Eun-som (KOR)
- Jo Yun-mi (PRK)
- Jong Pok-sim (PRK)

1 own goal

- Thidarat Wiwasukhu (THA) (against JPN)
- Nhiêu Thùy Linh (VIE) (against KOR)

== Final standing ==
Rank	Team	Pld	W	D	L	GF	GA	GD	Pts
1st place, gold medalist(s)	Japan	4	3	1	0	6	0	+6	10
2nd place, silver medalist(s)	North Korea	4	2	1	1	5	2	+3	7
3rd place, bronze medalist(s)	South Korea	5	3	1	1	14	4	+10	10
4	China	5	2	1	2	11	4	+7	7
5	Vietnam	3	1	0	2	4	7	−3	3
6	Thailand	2	0	0	2	0	6	−6	0
7	Jordan	3	0	0	3	1	18	−17	0
