= Zhang Na =

Zhang Na may refer to:

- Zhang Na (footballer) (born 1984), Chinese football (soccer) player
- Zhang Na (ski mountaineer) (born 1985), Chinese ski mountaineer
- Zhang Na (volleyball) (born 1980), Chinese volleyball player
