= Park Hee-young (disambiguation) =

Park Hee-young (born 1987) is a South Korean golfer.

Park Hee-young may also refer to:

- Park Hee-young (footballer, born 1985)
- Park Hee-young (footballer, born 1991)
