= Thin Thin Soe =

Burmese footballer

Personal information
- Date of birth: 3 October 1989 (age 37)
- Place of birth: Nyaungdon, Myanmar
- Position: Goalkeeper

International career^{‡}
Years	Team	Apps	(Gls)
2010–2013	Myanmar	2	(0)
- ‡ National team caps and goals as of 25 May 2013

Thin Thin Soe (born 3 October 1989) is a Burmese footballer who plays as a goalkeeper. She has been a member of the Myanmar women's national team.

== International career ==
Thin Thin Soe capped for Myanmar at the senior level during the 2010 AFC Women's Asian Cup and the 2014 AFC Women's Asian Cup qualification).
