= Choe Su-jin =

South Korean footballer (born 1987)

Personal information
- Full name: Choe Su-jin
- Date of birth: 27 June 1987
- Height: 1.66 m (5 ft 5 in)
- Position: Defender

Senior career*
Years	Team	Apps	(Gls)
2009-2011	Chungnam Ilhwa	57	(2)
2012-2024	Hwacheon KSPO		

International career
2010-2013	South Korea		
- * Club domestic league appearances and goals

Choe Su-jin (Korean: 최수진; born June 27, 1987) is a South Korean former footballer who played as a defender in the WK League and for the South Korean women's national team.

== Youth career ==
Choe played for the university football team while attending Uiduk University.

== Club career ==
Choe started her WK League career in 2009, playing for Chungnam Ilhwa. During her three seasons with the team, she made 57 appearances, recording two goals and four assists.

Choe then played for Hwacheon KSPO (formerly Jeonbuk KSPO) from the team's foundation in 2012 until her retirement from football in 2024. In her final season at the club, they finished the regular league season in 1st place for the first time. However, they finished as overall runners-up after losing the aggregate championship final 3–2 to Suwon FC.

In April 2023, the Korea Sports Promotion Foundation held a ceremony to recognise Choe's 300th appearance in the WK League. She became only the third player to reach this milestone.

== International career ==
Choe was included in the South Korean squad for the 2010 AFC Women's Asian Cup, where she appeared in group stage matches against China and Australia.

== Honours ==
=== Club ===
==== Chungnam Ilhwa Chunma ====
- National Women's Football Tournament: Champions, 2011

==== Hwacheon KSPO ====
- Korean National Sports Festival: Runners-up, 2013
- WK League: Runners-up, 2024

=== Individual ===
- WK League all-star match: 2009, 2011, 2012
- 2011 National Women's Football Tournament MVP
