= Jo Yun-mi (footballer, born 1987) =

North Korean footballer

- Hangul: 조윤미
- RR: Jo Yunmi
- MR: Cho Yunmi

Jo Yun-mi (Korean pronunciation: [tso.jun.mi]; born 5 January 1987 in Pyongyang) is a North Korean football midfielder that plays for the North Korea women's national football team. She played in the 2011 FIFA Women's World Cup.

== International goals ==
| No. | Date | Venue | Opponent | Score | Result | Competition |
|---|---|---|---|---|---|---|
| 1. | 6 August 2005 | Daegu, South Korea | China | 1–0 | 1–0 | 2005 EAFF Women's Football Championship |
| 2. | 18 July 2006 | Adelaide, Australia | Thailand | 6–0 | 9–0 | 2006 AFC Women's Asian Cup |
| 3. | 6 March 2010 | Brisbane, Australia | Australia | 1–1 | 2–3 | Friendly |
| 4. | 20 May 2010 | Chengdu, China | Thailand | 3–0 | 3–0 | 2010 AFC Women's Asian Cup |
| 5. | 22 May 2010 | Chengdu, China | Myanmar | 2–0 | 2–0 | 2010 AFC Women's Asian Cup |
| 6. | 30 May 2010 | Chengdu, China | Australia | 1–1 | 1–1 (a.e.t.) (4–5 p) | 2010 AFC Women's Asian Cup |
| 7. | 20 November 2010 | Guangzhou, China | South Korea | 1–0 | 3–1 (a.e.t.) | 2010 Asian Games |
| 8. | 8 March 2015 | Auckland, New Zealand | New Zealand | 1–1 | 1–1 | Friendly |
