= Waranya Chaikantree =

Thai footballer (born 1987)

Personal information
- Date of birth: 5 December 1987 (age 38)
- Position: Midfielder

International career^{‡}
Years	Team	Apps	(Gls)
2010	Thailand	1	(1)
- ‡ National team caps and goals as of 24 May 2010.

Waranya Chaikantree (Thai: วรัญญา ชัยกันตรี; born 5 December 1987) is a Thai footballer who plays as a midfielder. She has been a member of the Thailand women's national team.

== International career ==
Waranya capped for Thailand at senior level during the 2010 AFC Women's Asian Cup.

=== International goals ===
No.	Date	Venue	Opponent	Score	Result	Competition	Ref.
1.	24 May 2010	Shuangliu Sports Centre Stadium, Kuala Lumpur, Malaysia	Myanmar	2–0	2–0	2010 AFC Women's Asian Cup	
