= Đỗ Thị Thu Trang =

Vietnamese footballer

Personal information
- Date of birth: 4 November 1983 (age 42)
- Place of birth: Mê Linh, Hanoi, Vietnam
- Height: 1.63 m (5 ft 4 in)
- Position: Goalkeeper

Senior career*
Years	Team	Apps	(Gls)
1998–1999	Hà Nội II	3	(0)
2000–2013	Hà Nội I	42	(0)

International career^{‡}
2002–2010	Vietnam	12	(0)
- * Club domestic league appearances and goals ‡ National team caps and goals as of 2010

Đỗ Thị Thu Trang (born 4 November 1983) is a Vietnamese former footballer who played as a goalkeeper. She has been a member of the Vietnam women's national team.
