= Waldemir (footballer) =

Brazilian footballer (born 1981)

Personal information
- Full name: Waldemir Marques de Brito
- Date of birth: November 18, 1981 (age 44)
- Place of birth: Brazil
- Height: 1.80 m (5 ft 11 in)
- Position: Defender

Senior career*
Years	Team	Apps	(Gls)
2006	URT		
2007–2008	Novo Hamburgo		
2008–2009	Beijing Hongdeng	41	(0)
2010	Hunan Billows	22	(1)
- * Club domestic league appearances and goals

Waldemir Marques de Brito or simply Waldemir or Neno, is a Brazilian football striker.

Waldemir previously played for URT in the Copa do Brasil.

He joined Hunan Billows in February 2010.
