= Pang Fengyue =

Chinese footballer

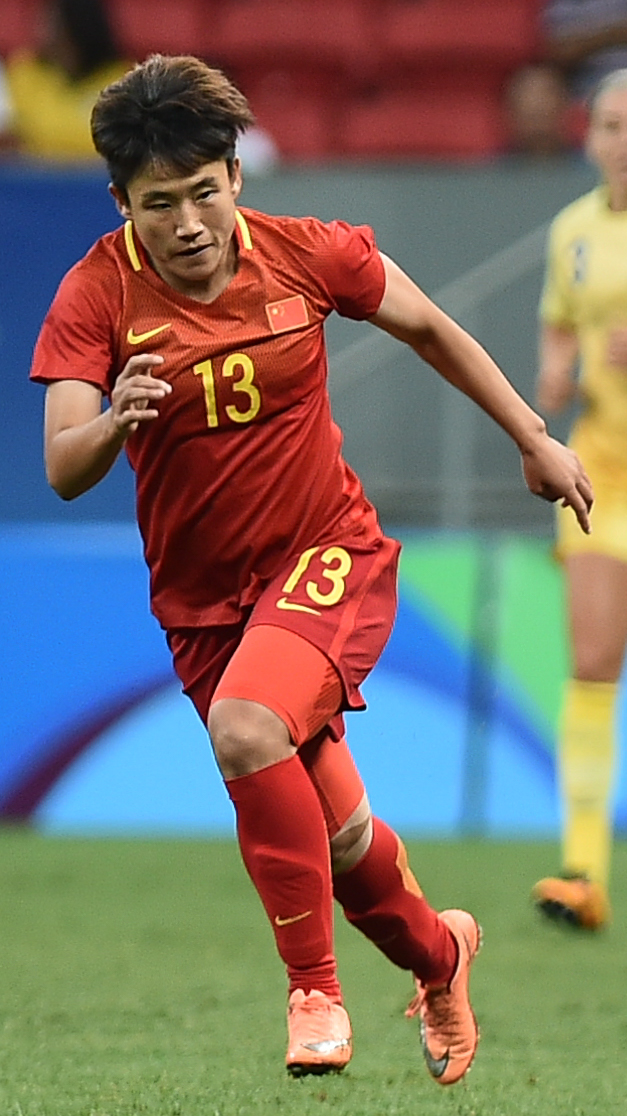
- Pang at the 2016 Olympics

Personal information
- Full name: Pang Fengyue
- Date of birth: January 19, 1989 (age 37)
- Place of birth: Dalian, Liaoning, China
- Height: 1.65 m (5 ft 5 in)
- Position: Midfielder

Senior career*
Years	Team	Apps	(Gls)
?	Dalian	0	(0)
2020–2021	Changchun Jiuyin Loans	8	(1)
2022–2024	Dalian	2	(1)
2025	Liaoning Baiye	0	(0)

International career
2009–2019	China	87	(6)
- * Club domestic league appearances and goals as of 12 March 2020

Pang Fengyue (simplified Chinese: 庞丰月; traditional Chinese: 龐豐月; pinyin: Páng Fēngyuè; born 19 January 1989) is a female Chinese footballer who plays as a midfielder.

== International goals ==
No.	Date	Venue	Opponent	Score	Result	Competition
1.	13 February 2010	Ajinomoto Stadium, Tokyo, Japan	Chinese Taipei	3–0	3–0	2010 EAFF Women's Football Championship
2.	14 November 2010	Guangzhou Higher Education Mega Center Central Stadium, Guangzhou, China	Jordan	10–1	10–1	2010 Asian Games
