= Jin Xiaomei =

Chinese footballer

Personal information
- Date of birth: January 1, 1983 (age 43)
- Place of birth: Weifang, Shandong, China

International career
Years	Team	Apps	(Gls)
2004	China		

Jin Xiaomei (simplified Chinese: 晋小梅; traditional Chinese: 晉小梅; pinyin: Jìn Xiǎoméi; born January 1, 1983, in Weifang, Shandong) is a female Chinese football (soccer) player who competed in the 2004 Summer Olympics.

In 2004, she finished ninth with the Chinese team in the women's tournament. She played both matches.
