= Ri Jin-sim =

North Korean footballer

Personal information
- Date of birth: 29 May 1991 (age 35)
- Position: Goalkeeper

Senior career*
Years	Team	Apps	(Gls)
- Wolmido

International career^{‡}
	North Korea	1	(0)
- * Club domestic league appearances and goals ‡ National team caps and goals as of 26 June 2011 (before the 2011 FIFA Women's World Cup)

Ri Jin-sim (born 29 May 1991,Korean: 리진심) is a North Korean footballer who plays as a goalkeeper for the North Korea women's national football team. She was part of the team at the 2011 FIFA Women's World Cup. At the club level, she plays for Wolmido in North Korea.
