= Ma Jun (footballer) =

Chinese footballer

Personal information
- Full name: Ma Jun
- Date of birth: March 6, 1989 (age 37)
- Place of birth: Lianyungang, Jiangsu, China
- Height: 1.65 m (5 ft 5 in)
- Position: Midfielder

Team information
- Current team: Jiangsu
- Number: 6

Senior career*
Years	Team	Apps	(Gls)
2007–2020	Jiangsu	12	(1)
2021–2025	Wuhan Jianghan University	27	(4)
2026–	Jiangsu	0	(0)

International career^{‡}
2009–2022	China	75	(15)
- * Club domestic league appearances and goals ‡ National team caps and goals as of 18:30, 6 February 2021 (UTC)

Ma Jun (simplified Chinese: 马君; traditional Chinese: 馬君; pinyin: Mǎ Jūn; born 6 March 1989) is a female Chinese footballer who plays as a midfielder for Jiangsu.

== International goals ==
No.	Date	Venue	Opponent	Score	Result	Competition
1.	14 November 2010	Guangzhou Higher Education Mega Center Central Stadium, Guangzhou, China	Jordan	1–0	10–1	2010 Asian Games
2.	14 November 2010	Guangzhou Higher Education Mega Center Central Stadium, Guangzhou, China	Jordan	6–1	10–1	2010 Asian Games
3.	18 September 2014	Incheon Namdong Asiad Rugby Field, Incheon, South Korea	Chinese Taipei	4–0	4–0	2014 Asian Games
4.	9 April 2018	King Abdullah II Stadium, Amman, Jordan	Philippines	2–0	3–0	2018 AFC Women's Asian Cup
