= Liu Huana =

Chinese footballer (born 1981)

Medal record

Women's football

Representing China

Asian Games
Bronze medal – third place	2006 Doha	Team

Liu Huana (simplified Chinese: 刘华娜; traditional Chinese: 劉華娜; pinyin: Liú Huánà; born May 17, 1981, in Shandong) is a female Chinese football (soccer) player who competed at the 2004 Summer Olympics.

In 2004, she was a squad member of the Chinese team which finished ninth in the women's tournament.

== International goals ==
No.	Date	Venue	Opponent	Score	Result	Competition
1.	14 November 2010	Guangzhou Higher Education Mega Center Central Stadium, Guangzhou, China	Jordan	8–1	10–1	2010 Asian Games

== See also ==
- List of women's footballers with 100 or more international caps
