= Park Hee-young (footballer, born 1985) =

South Korean footballer

Personal information
- Date of birth: 11 June 1985 (age 41)
- Place of birth: Taebaek, South Korea
- Height: 1.64 m (5 ft 4 1/2 in)
- Position: Forward

Youth career
- Yeungjin College

Senior career*
Years	Team	Apps	(Gls)
2005–2008	Goyang Daekyo Noonnoppi		
2009	Bad Neuenahr		
2009-2011	Goyang Daekyo Noonnoppi		
2012-2015	Jeonbuk KSPO		

International career
2004	South Korea U20	8	(4)
2005–2013	South Korea	55	(22)
Medal record
Women's football
Representing South Korea
Asian Games
Bronze medal – third place	2010 Guangzhou	Team
- * Club domestic league appearances and goals

- Park Hee-young
- Hangul: 박희영
- RR: Bak Huiyeong
- MR: Pak Hŭiyŏng

Park Hee-young (Korean: 박희영, Korean pronunciation: [pa.kʰi.jʌŋ] or [pak̚] [hi.jʌŋ]; born 11 June 1985) is a South Korean former football player. Considered part of the country's first generation of women's footballers, she was the first South Korean woman to play professionally in Europe.

== Club career ==
Park joined Goyang Daekyo Noonnoppi in 2005. In 2009, she signed with German side SC 07 Bad Neuenahr, becoming the first South Korean woman to play football professionally in Europe. Later the same year, she returned to Korea and re-signed with Daekyo.

Ahead of the 2012 season, Park joined Jeonbuk KSPO, where she continued to play until retiring from football at the end of the 2015 season.

== International career ==
Park made her full international debut for South Korea in 2005.

== Honours ==
=== Team ===
Korea Republic

- EAFF Women's Football Championship : 2005

=== Individual ===
- Windsorawards Korea Football Award - Best Eleven (FW) : 2008

== International goals ==
No.	Date	Venue	Opponent	Score	Result	Competition
1.	4 December 2006	Al-Rayyan, Qatar	Vietnam	2–0	3–1	2006 Asian Games
2.	7 December 2006	Al-Rayyan, Qatar	North Korea	1–3	1–4	2006 Asian Games
3.	10 December 2006	Doha, Qatar	Japan	1–3	1–3	2006 Asian Games
4.	17 February 2007	Masan, South Korea	India	2–0	5–0	2008 Summer Olympics qualification
5.	17 February 2007	Masan, South Korea	India	4–0	5–0	2008 Summer Olympics qualification
6.	25 February 2007	Chennai, India	India	2–0	3–0	2008 Summer Olympics qualification
7.	10 June 2007	Bucheon, South Korea	Japan	2–2	2–2	2008 Summer Olympics qualification
8.	1 July 2007	Yona, Guam	Chinese Taipei	2–0	4–1	2008 EAFF Women's Football Championship
9.	18 February 2008	Chongqing, China	China	1–1	2–3	2008 EAFF Women's Football Championship
10.	18 February 2008	Chongqing, China	China	2–1	2–3	2008 EAFF Women's Football Championship
11.	26 March 2008	Nakhon Ratchasima, Thailand	Malaysia	1–0	13–0	2008 AFC Women's Asian Cup qualification
12.	26 March 2008	Nakhon Ratchasima, Thailand	Malaysia	4–0	13–0	2008 AFC Women's Asian Cup qualification
13.	29 May 2008	Hồ Chí Minh City, Vietnam	Japan	2–1	3–1	2008 AFC Women's Asian Cup
14.	29 May 2008	Hồ Chí Minh City, Vietnam	Japan	3–1	3–1	2008 AFC Women's Asian Cup
15.	14 June 2008	Suwon, South Korea	New Zealand	2–1	2–1	2008 Peace Queen Cup
16.	26 August 2009	Tainan County, Taiwan	Northern Mariana Islands	7–0	19–0	2010 EAFF Women's Football Championship
17.	26 August 2009	Tainan County, Taiwan	Northern Mariana Islands	8–0	19–0	2010 EAFF Women's Football Championship
18.	10 January 2009	Guangzhou, China	Finland	1–0	4–0	2009 Four Nations Tournament
19.	10 January 2009	Guangzhou, China	Finland	3–0	4–0	2009 Four Nations Tournament
20.	14 November 2010	Guangzhou, China	Vietnam	2–1	6–1	2010 Asian Games
21.	14 November 2010	Guangzhou, China	Vietnam	5–1	6–1	2010 Asian Games
22.	22 November 2010	Guangzhou, China	China	1–0	2–0	2010 Asian Games
