= Li Danyang =

Chinese footballer

Personal information
- Full name: Li Danyang
- Date of birth: 8 April 1990 (age 36)
- Place of birth: China
- Position: Defender

International career^{‡}
Years	Team	Apps	(Gls)
200?–200?	China U19	?	(0)
200?–2018	China	11+	(1)
- ‡ National team caps and goals as of 12 June 2018

Li Danyang (born 8 April 1990) is a Chinese footballer who plays as a defender. She has been a member of the China women's national team.

== International goals ==
No.	Date	Venue	Opponent	Score	Result	Competition
1.	21 May 2010	Shuangliu Sports Centre, Chengdu, China	Vietnam	1–0	5–0	2010 AFC Women's Asian Cup
