= Myanmar women's national football team =

Myanmar
- Nickname: Chinthe Ladies
- Association: Myanmar Football Federation
- Confederation: AFC (Asia)
- Sub-confederation: AFF (South-East Asia)
- Head coach: Colin Bell
- Captain: Khin Marlar Tun
- Most caps: Khin Moe Wai (130)
- Top scorer: Win Theingi Tun (86)
- Home stadium: Thuwunna Stadium
- FIFA code: MYA
First colours	Second colours	Third colours

FIFA ranking
- Current: 56 ▼1 (20 October 2026)
- Highest: 42 (September 2009; December 2013)
- Lowest: 56 (August 2025)

First international
- Myanmar 1–1 Philippines (Chiangmai, Thailand; 5 December 1995)

Biggest win
- Myanmar 17–0 Maldives (Ho Chi Minh City, Vietnam; 1 October 2004); Myanmar 17–0 Timor-Leste (Mandalay, Myanmar; 27 July 2016)

Biggest defeat
- South Korea 12–0 Myanmar (Ho Chi Minh City, Vietnam; 15 May 2014)

Asian Cup
- Appearances: 5 (first in 2003)
- Best result: Group stage (2003, 2006, 2010, 2014, 2022)

AFF Championship
- Appearances: 12 (first in 2004)
- Best result: Champions (2004, 2007); Runners up (2025), (2015), (2012),(2011),

The Myanmar women's national football team is the female association football team representing Myanmar and is under the management of the Myanmar Football Federation (MFF).

== History ==
Myanmar played its first game in 1995, against the Philippines, which they drew 1-1 in the 1995 Southeast Asian Games. Since then, Myanmar has received more money from the state and improved its game.

In 2005, the country was one of several teams that included Brunei, Thailand, Indonesia, East Timor, Malaysia, Cambodia, Laos, Vietnam, Burma and Singapore, that fielded a women's football team to compete at the Southeast Asian Games in Marikina in December.

Myanmar first took part in the 2003 AFC Women's Championship held in Thailand, and has since qualified five times. They have never progressed beyond the group stage in the tournament. In the 2022 AFC Women's Asian Cup, they had come close to winning the first group game and qualify for the knockout stage for the first time, but a 2-2 draw to Vietnam after taking the lead twice put an end to that hope.

== FIFA World Ranking ==
As of 28 January 2022, after the match against Vietnam.

Best Ranking Best Mover Worst Ranking Worst Mover

Myanmar's FIFA World Ranking History
Rank	Year	Games Played	Won	Lost	Drawn	Best		Worst	
Rank	Year	Games Played	Won	Lost	Drawn	Rank	Move	Rank	Move
56 ▼1 (20 October 2026)	2022	3	0	2	1	47	Steady	47	Steady

== Results and fixtures ==
The following is a list of match results in the last 12 months, as well as any future matches that have been scheduled.

Legend

Win Draw Loss Fixture

=== 2025 ===
5 December 2025 SEA Games	Myanmar	2–1	Philippines	Chonburi, Thailand
16:00 UTC+7	Win Theingi Tun 4'; May Htet Lu 89'	Report	Ramirez 69'	Stadium: IPE Chonburi Stadium; Referee: Sunita Thongthawin (Thailand)

8 December 2025 SEA Games	Malaysia	0–3	Myanmar	Chonburi, Thailand
16:00 UTC+7		Report	San Thaw Thaw 25'; May Htet Lu 35'; Win Theingi Tun 64'	Stadium: IPE Chonburi Stadium; Referee: Alesar Baddour (Syria

11 December 2025 SEA Games	Vietnam	2–0	Myanmar	Chonburi, Thailand
16:00 UTC+7	Ngân Thị Vạn Sự 8'; Nguyễn Thị Bích Thùy 14'	Report		Stadium: IPE Chonburi Stadium

=== 2026 ===
3 June AYA Bank Tri Nation Cup	Myanmar	0–1	Uzbekistan	Yangon, Myanmar
17:00 UTC+6:30			Nilufar Kudratova 22'	Stadium: Thuwunna Stadium

9 June AYA Bank Tri Nation Cup	Myanmar	1–1	Thailand	Yangon, Myanmar
17:00 UTC+6:30	May Htet Lu 50'		Thawanrat Promthongmee 55'	Stadium: Thuwunna Stadium

14 September 2026 Asian Games	South Korea	5–0	Myanmar	Osaka, Japan
19:30 UTC+9	Kim Min-ji 29', 33', 59'; Jang Sel-gi 38'; Choe Yu-ri 76'	Report		Stadium: Nagai Stadium; Attendance: 500; Referee: Tian Jin (China)

17 September 2026 Asian Games	Myanmar	0–8	North Korea	Osaka, Japan
19:30 UTC+9				Stadium: Nagai Stadium

21 September 2026 Asian Games	Bangladesh	0–0	Myanmar	Osaka, Japan
16:00 UTC+9		Report		Stadium: Nagai Stadium; Attendance: 571; Referee: Roziyabonu Yusupova (Uzbekistan)

1 December Friendly	Myanmar	v	Hong Kong	Yangon, Myanmar
				Stadium: Thuwunna Stadium

4 December Friendly	Myanmar	v	Hong Kong	Yangon, Myanmar
				Stadium: Thuwunna Stadium

== Coaching staff ==
=== Current coaching staff ===
Position	Name
Head coach	(England) Colin Bell
Assistant coach	(South Korea) Jeong Sang Kwon (Myanmar) Thuzar Htwe
Goalkeeping coach	(Myanmar) Sein Aye
Fitness coach	(Myanmar) Htet Kyaw Tun
Video analyst	(Myanmar) Myat Soe Thu
Team doctor	(Myanmar) Zin Yadanar Wint
Media officer	(Myanmar) Aung Aung
Videographer	(Myanmar) Zarni Ohn Khin
Scouting	(Myanmar) Kyi Lwin
Physiotheropist	(Myanmar) Thura Toe
Team leader	(Myanmar) Myat Myat Oo

=== Coaching history ===
Name	Period	Matches	Wins	Draws	Losses	Winning %	Refs
(Japan) Kumada Yoshinori	2011–2019	84	38	6	31	45.2%	
(Myanmar) Tin Myint Aung	2019–2022	12	6	2	4	50%	
(Japan) Tetsuro Uki	2023–2025	27	17	3	7	63%	
(Japan) Mitsuo Kato	2026	2	0	1	1	0%	
(England) Colin Bell	2026-	3	0	1	2	0%	

As of 12 December 2025, after the match against Vietnam.

* = caretaker

== Players ==
=== Current squad ===
The following 36 players were called up for friendly matches.

Caps and goals updated as of 21 September 2026, after the match against Bangladesh.

No.	Pos.	Player	Date of birth (age)	Caps	Goals	Club
	GK	Ei Sandar Zaw	15 February 2000 (age 26)	4	0	(Myanmar Football Federation) Ayeyawady
	GK	Zu Latt Nadi	22 December 2000 (age 25)	1	0	(Myanmar Football Federation) ISPE
	GK	Chan Myae Yadanar		0	0	(Myanmar Football Federation) Shan State
	GK	May Oo Khin		0	0	(Myanmar Football Federation) Yadanarbon
	GK	Khin Khin Zaw		0	0	(Myanmar Football Federation) Ayeyawady
	DF	Yu Yu Naing	29 November 2007 (age 18)	2	0	(Myanmar Football Federation) Yangon United
	DF	Nan Sanay Ma	10 July 2004 (age 22)	0	0	(Myanmar Football Federation) Yangon United
	DF	Khin Moe Win	6 November 2000 (age 26)	0	0	(Myanmar Football Federation) Ayeyawady
	DF	Zune Yu Ya Oo	12 February 2001 (age 25)	35	0	(Myanmar Football Federation) Ayeyawady
	DF	Lin Lae Oo	6 September 2002 (age 24)	18	0	(Myanmar Football Federation) ISPE
	DF	Than Than Nwe	5 August 2001 (age 25)	8	0	(Myanmar Football Federation) ISPE
	DF	Aye Aye Soe	{	0	0	(Myanmar Football Federation) Yadanarbon
	DF	Yamin Thant Zin		0	0	(Myanmar Football Federation) Yadanarbon
	DF	Thiri Nandar Soe		0	0	(Myanmar Football Federation) Yadanarbon
	MF	Phyu Phyu Win	12 January 2004 (age 22)	56	1	(Myanmar Football Federation) Ayeyawady
	MF	Naw Htet Htet Wai	30 July 2000 (age 26)	36	0	(Myanmar Football Federation) Ayeyawady
	MF	Khin Marlar Tun	21 September 1989 (age 37)	132	33	(Myanmar Football Federation) ISPE
	MF	Yu Par Khaing	31 January 1996 (age 30)	38	4	(Myanmar Football Federation) Yadanarbon
	MF	Win Win	12 February 2003 (age 23)	17	8	(Myanmar Football Federation) Thitsar Arman
	MF	Zin Mar Htwe	5 May 2003 (age 23)	0	0	(Myanmar Football Federation) Thitsar Arman
	MF	Khin Mo Mo Tun	3 July 1999 (age 27)	40	5	(Myanmar Football Federation) Thitsar Arman
	MF	Win Sandar		0	0	(Myanmar Football Federation) Yadanarbon
	MF	Lin Myint Mo	9 June 2002 (age 24)	37	5	(Myanmar Football Federation) ISPE
	MF	Shwe Yee Tun	14 May 2003 (age 23)	16	6	(Myanmar Football Federation) ISPE
	MF	Daisy Aung	9 June 2006 (age 20)	1	0	(Myanmar Football Federation) Yangon United
	FW	Honey Phoo Wai	18 April 2010 (age 16)	0	0	(Myanmar Football Federation) Young Lionesses
	MF	Win Yupar	4 January 2011 (age 15)	0	0	(Myanmar Football Federation) Young Lionesses
	MF	Pin Myint Yan	10 January 2009 (age 17)	0	0	(Myanmar Football Federation) Yadanarbon
	MF	Yoon Wadi Hlaing	9 September 2005 (age 21)	13	2	(Myanmar Football Federation) Yangon United
	FW	Win Theingi Tun	1 February 1995 (age 31)	94	86	(Myanmar Football Federation) Yadanarbon
	FW	Hnin Sandar Win		0	0	(Myanmar Football Federation) Yadanarbon
	FW	Myat Noe Khin	24 July 2003 (age 23)	24	8	(Myanmar Football Federation) Thitsar Arman
	FW	Su Su Kyi	30 May 2006 (age 20)	4	0	(Myanmar Football Federation) Yangon United
	FW	San Thaw Thaw	2 January 2001 (age 25)	49	18	(Myanmar Football Federation) Ayeyawady
	FW	Zin Moe Pyae	15 January 2003 (age 23)	2	0	(Myanmar Football Federation) Yangon United
	FW	Shin Thant Phyu Sin Pyone	6 June 2010 (age 16)	0	0	(Myanmar Football Federation) Ayeyawady

=== Recent call-ups ===
The following players have been called up for the Myanmar within the past 12 months.

Pos.	Player	Date of birth (age)	Caps	Goals	Club	Latest call-up
GK	Myo Mya Mya Nyein	22 August 1999 (age 27)	26	0	(Myanmar) Thitsar Arman	
GK	Thuzar Aung		0	0	(Myanmar) Thitsar Arman	
GK	Thet Htar Aung		0	0	(Myanmar) Myawady W.F.C.	
GK	Hla Hla Htwe		0	0	(Myanmar) Yadanarbon	
GK	Htet Eaindra Lin	5 May 2002 (age 24)	0	0	(Myanmar) ISPE	
DF	Hnin Pwint Aye	26 January 2004 (age 22)	6	0	(Myanmar)	
DF	May Thet Mon Myint	1 January 2004 (age 22)	22	1	(Myanmar) Thitsar Arman	
DF	Zune Thae Oo	24 November 2002 (age 23)	0	0	(Myanmar) Shan United	
DF	Khin Myo Thandar Htun	22 February 2004 (age 22)	4	0	(Myanmar) Shan United	
DF	Sandar Lin		3	1	(Myanmar) ISPE W.F.C.	
DF	Nan Phyu Phwe	9 May 2005 (age 21)	9	0	(Myanmar) Ayeyawady	
DF	Pyae Paing Hmue Eain		0	0	(Myanmar) Young Lionesses W.F.C.	
DF	Min Htone May Zitar		0	0	(Myanmar) Young Lionesses W.F.C.	
DF	Wai Hin Phyo		0	0	(Myanmar) ISPE	
DF	Saung Hnin Phwe	26 November 2003 (age 22)	0	0	(Myanmar) Shan United	
MF	Hay Marn Soe	21 May 2005 (age 21)	0	0	(Myanmar) ISPE	
MF	Nang Khine Zin Myint	8 February 2009 (age 17)	0	0	(Myanmar) Ayeyawady	
MF	Nan Phyu Phyu Thwe		0	0	(Myanmar) Shan United	
MF	Yoon Wati		0	0	(Myanmar) Thitsar Arman	
MF	Yin Loon Eain	21 March 2006 (age 20)	7	0	(Myanmar) ISPE W.F.C.	
MF	Phyu Phyu Kyaw		0	0	(Myanmar) Ayeyawady W.F.C.	
MF	Nang Hom Hlaing		0	0	(Myanmar) ISPE	
MF	Win Sandar		0	0	(Myanmar) YREO W.F.C.	
FW	May Htet Lu	29 January 2003 (age 23)	16	9	(Myanmar) Ayeyawady	

=== Previous squads ===
AFC Women's Asian Cup

- 2003 AFC Women's Championship squad
- 2006 AFC Women's Asian Cup squad
- 2010 AFC Women's Asian Cup squad
- 2014 AFC Women's Asian Cup squad
- 2022 AFC Women's Asian Cup squad
- 2026 AFC Women's Asian Cup squad

AFF SEA Games

- 2025 SEA Games squad

== Competitive record ==
=== FIFA Women's World Cup ===
FIFA Women's World Cup record										Qualification record						
Year	Result	Position	Pld	W	D	L	GF	GA	GD	Pld	W	D	L	GF	GA	GD
(China) 1991	Did not exist									Did not exist						
(Sweden) 1995	Did not exist									Did not exist						
(United States) 1999	Did not enter									Did not enter						
(United States) 2003	Did not qualify									Via AFC Women's Asian Cup						
(China) 2007	Did not qualify									Via AFC Women's Asian Cup						
(Germany) 2011	Did not qualify									Via AFC Women's Asian Cup						
(Canada) 2015	Did not qualify									Via AFC Women's Asian Cup						
(France) 2019	Did not qualify									Via AFC Women's Asian Cup						
(Australia) (New Zealand) 2023	Did not qualify									Via AFC Women's Asian Cup						
(Brazil) 2027	Did not qualify									Via AFC Women's Asian Cup						
(Costa Rica) (Jamaica) (Mexico) (United States) 2031	To be determined									To be determined						
(United Kingdom) 2035	To be determined									To be determined						
Total	0/10	–	–	–	–	–	–	–	–	–	–	–	–	–	–	–

=== Olympic Games ===
Summer Olympics record									Qualification record						
Year	Round	Pld	W	D*	L	GF	GA	GD	Pld	W	D*	L	GF	GA	GD
(United States) 1996	Did not enter								Did not enter						
(Australia) 2000	Did not enter								Did not enter						
(Greece) 2004	Did not qualify								3	1	0	2	2	18	−16
(China) 2008	Did not qualify								3	0	1	2	1	4	−3
(United Kingdom) 2012	Did not qualify								4	1	1	2	2	5	−3
(Brazil) 2016	Did not qualify								6	4	0	2	31	7	+24
(Japan) 2020	Did not qualify								8	4	2	2	20	14	+6
(France) 2024	Did not qualify								2	0	1	1	1	2	−1
(United States) 2028	Did not qualify								Via AFC Women's Asian Cup						
(Australia) 2032	To be determined								To be determined						
Total	0/9	–	–	–	–	–	–	–	26	10	5	11	57	50	+7

*Draws include knockout matches decided on penalty kicks.

=== AFC Women's Asian Cup ===
AFC Women's Asian Cup record									Qualification record						
Year	Result	Pld	W	D*	L	GF	GA	GD	Pld	W	D*	L	GF	GA	GD
(Hong Kong) 1975 to (Malaysia) 1993	Did not exist								No Qualification						
(Malaysia) 1995 to (Chinese Taipei) 2001	Did not enter								No Qualification						
(Thailand) 2003	Group stage	5	2	1	1	11	8	+3	No Qualification						
(Australia) 2006	Group stage	4	0	0	4	2	10	−8	3	2	0	1	6	3	+3
(Vietnam) 2008	Did not qualify								3	1	0	2	2	5	−3
(China) 2010	Group stage	3	0	0	3	0	12	−12	2	2	0	0	8	2	+6
(Vietnam) 2014	Group stage	3	0	0	3	1	17	−16	3	2	1	0	11	0	+11
(Jordan) 2018	Did not qualify								4	3	0	1	22	2	+20
(India) 2022	Group stage	3	0	1	2	2	9	−7	3	3	0	0	14	0	+14
(Australia) 2026	Did not qualify								3	2	0	1	15	2	+13
(Uzbekistan) 2029	To be determined								To be determined						
Total	5/21	17	2	2	13	16	56	−40	21	15	1	5	78	14	+64

*Draws include knockout matches decided on penalty kicks.

=== Asian Games ===
Asian Games record
Year	Round	GP	W	D	L	GS	GA	GD
(China) 1990	Did not exist							
(Japan) 1994	Did not exist							
(Thailand) 1998	Did not enter							
(South Korea) 2002	Did not enter							
(Qatar) 2006	Did not enter							
(China) 2010	Did not enter							
(South Korea) 2014	Did not enter							
(Indonesia) 2018	Did not enter							
(China) 2022	Group stage	3	1	0	2	1	6	−5
(Japan) 2026	Group stage	3	0	1	2	0	13	−13
Total	2/10	6	1	1	4	1	19	−18

*Draws include knockout matches decided on penalty kicks.

=== AFF Women's Championship ===
AFF Women's Championship record
Year	Round	Position	GP	W	D*	L	GF	GA	GD
(Vietnam) 2004	Champions	1st	5	4	1	0	32	5	+27
(Vietnam) 2006	Fourth place	4th	3	0	0	3	2	7	−5
(Myanmar) 2007	Champions	1st	5	5	0	0	11	2	+9
(Vietnam) 2008	Fourth place	4th	6	3	0	3	22	11	+11
(Laos) 2011	Runners-up	2nd	5	3	0	2	14	6	+8
(Vietnam) 2012	Runners-up	2nd	5	3	0	2	19	6	+13
(Myanmar) 2013	Fourth place	4th	5	3	0	2	16	9	+7
(Vietnam) 2015	Runners-up	2nd	5	3	0	2	13	7	+6
(Myanmar) 2016	Third place	3rd	5	3	2	0	24	5	+19
(Indonesia) 2018	Fourth place	4th	6	3	0	3	21	11	+10
(Thailand) 2019	Third place	3rd	5	3	0	2	20	9	+11
(Philippines) 2022	Third place	3rd	6	4	0	2	17	10	+7
(Vietnam) 2025	Runners-up	2nd	5	3	1	1	8	4	+4
Total	13/13	Best: Champions	66	40	4	22	219	92	+127

*Draws include knockout matches decided on penalty kicks.

=== SEA Games ===
SEA Games record
Year	Round	GP	W	D*	L	GF	GA	GD
(Thailand) 1985	Did not enter							
(Thailand) 1995	Bronze Medal	4	1	2	1	8	9	−1
(Indonesia) 1997	Silver Medal	4	2	1	1	6	8	−2
(Malaysia) 2001	Bronze Medal	5	3	1	1	11	3	+8
(Vietnam) 2003	Silver Medal	4	3	0	1	16	4	+12
(Philippines) 2005	Silver Medal	5	4	0	1	11	3	+8
(Thailand) 2007	Bronze Medal	4	2	2	1	13	4	+9
(Laos) 2009	Bronze Medal	4	1	3	0	11	5	+6
(Myanmar) 2013	Bronze Medal	4	2	0	2	10	3	+7
(Malaysia) 2017	Bronze Medal	4	2	0	2	14	6	+8
(Philippines) 2019	Bronze Medal	4	2	1	1	7	2	+5
(Vietnam) 2021	Fourth place	5	2	1	2	6	4	+2
(Cambodia) 2023	Silver Medal	5	3	0	2	11	8	+3
(Thailand) 2025	Group stage	3	2	0	1	5	3	+2
Total	Best: Silver Medal	55	29	11	16	129	62	+67

*Draws include knockout matches decided on penalty kicks.

== Honours ==
=== Regional ===
- ASEAN Women's Championship

- Winners (2): 2004, 2007
- Runner-Up (4): 2011, 2012, 2015, 2025
- Bronze medal (3): 2016, 2019, 2022

- Southeast Asian Games

- Silver medal (3): 1997, 2003, 2005, 2023
- Bronze medal (7): 1995, 2001, 2007, 2009, 2013, 2017, 2019

=== Other tournaments ===
- Women's Gold Cup

- Winners (1): 2019

- Vianet International Women's Championship

- Winners (1): 2025

- Malaysia Open Cup
  - Winners (1): 2005 Malaysia Open Cup
- Hanoi Open Cup
  - Runners-up (1): 2002

== See also ==
- Myanmar Football Federation (MFF)
- Football in Myanmar

National teams

- Myanmar women's national football team
  - Myanmar women's national football team results
- Myanmar women's national under-20 football team
- Myanmar women's national under-17 football team
