= Zhang Yue (footballer, born 1990) =

Chinese footballer

Personal information
- Full name: Zhang Yue
- Date of birth: 30 September 1990 (age 36)
- Place of birth: Tianjin, China
- Height: 1.85 m (6 ft 1 in)
- Position: Goalkeeper

International career^{‡}
Years	Team	Apps	(Gls)
2009–2015	China	49	(0)
- ‡ National team caps and goals as of 5 June 2016

Zhang Yue (simplified Chinese: 张越; traditional Chinese: 張越; pinyin: Zhāng Yuè; born 30 September 1990) is a female Chinese football player who is a goalkeeper.
