= Zhang Na (footballer) =

Chinese footballer (born 1984)

Zhang Na (Chinese: 张娜;born 10 March 1984 in Zhangjiakou, Hebei) is a Chinese football player who competed for the national team in the 2008 Summer Olympics. Her position is that of midfielder.

== Major performances ==
- 2008 Asian Cup - 2nd
