= 2010 AFC Women's Asian Cup =

Coordinates: 30°39′N 104°03′E

Tournament details
- Host country: China
- City: Chengdu
- Dates: 19–30 May
- Teams: 8 (from 1 confederation)
- Venue(s): Chengdu Sports Centre Stadium; Shuangliu Sports Centre Stadium

Final positions
- Champions: Australia (1st title)
- Runners-up: North Korea
- Third place: Japan
- Fourth place: China

Tournament statistics
- Matches played: 16
- Goals scored: 45 (2.81 per match)
- Attendance: 59,910 (3,744 per match)
- Top scorer(s): (Japan) Kozue Ando (Japan) Homare Sawa (North Korea) Jo Yun-mi (South Korea) Yoo Young-a (3 goals)

The 2010 AFC Women's Asian Cup was held from 19–30 May at the Chengdu Sports Centre in China PR. The winners, Australia, runners-up, Korea DPR, and third-place team, Japan qualified for the 2011 FIFA Women's World Cup.

With this victory, Australia women's had become the first ever national team to win in two different confederations, having won the OFC Women's Nations Cup three times before. Their success was later followed by their fellow men's team at the men's tournament less than 5 years later.

== Venues ==
Chengdu
Chengdu Sports Center Stadium	Shuangliu Sports Centre Stadium
Capacity: 40,000	Capacity: 26,000
2010 AFC Women's Asian Cup is located in China

== Qualification ==
Direct entry

- North Korea
- China
- Australia
- Japan
- South Korea

Via qualification

- Myanmar (Winner Group A)
- Thailand (Winner Group B)
- Vietnam (Winner Group C)

== Match officials ==
A total of 9 referees and 9 assistant referees were appointed for the final tournament.

Referees

- (Australia) Jacqui Melksham
- (China) Li Hong
- (China) Wang Jia
- (India) Bentla D'Coth
- (Japan) Yamagishi Sachiko
- (North Korea) Ri Hyang-ok
- (South Korea) Hong Eun-ah
- (Thailand) Pannipar Kamnueng
- (Thailand) Semaksuk Praew

Assistant referees

- (Australia) Sarah Ho
- (Australia) Clare Flynn
- (China) Zhang Lingling
- (Chinese Taipei) Liu Hsiu-mei
- (Japan) Saori Takahashi
- (Japan) Shiho Ayukai
- (Malaysia) Widiya Habibah binti Shamsuri
- (North Korea) Hong Kum-nyo
- (South Korea) Kim Kyoung-min

== Group stages ==
The two groups were drawn on 21 November 2009 in Kuala Lumpur, Malaysia.

=== Group A ===
Team	Pld	W	D	L	GF	GA	GD	Pts
Japan	3	3	0	0	14	1	+13	9
North Korea	3	2	0	1	6	2	+4	6
Thailand	3	1	0	2	2	7	−5	3
Myanmar	3	0	0	3	0	12	−12	0

Source: RSSSF
20 May 2010
16:00 UTC+08:00

North Korea	3–0	Thailand
Jon Myong-hwa 1'; Kim Yong-ae 2'; Jo Yun-mi 73'	Report (AFC); Report

Chengdu Sports Center Stadium, Chengdu
Attendance: 260
Referee: Bentla D'Coth (India)
20 May 2010
19:30 UTC+08:00

Japan	8–0	Myanmar
Iwashimizu 4'; Sawa 10', 71'; Yamaguchi 28' (pen.), 60'; Sameshima 50'; Miyama 54'; Kamionobe 85'	Report (AFC); Report

Chengdu Sports Center Stadium, Chengdu
Attendance: 360
Referee: Hong Eun-ah (South Korea)

22 May 2010
16:00 UTC+08:00

Thailand	0–4	Japan
	Report (AFC); Report	Takase 28'; Nakano 42'; Utsugi 45+3'; Ando 55'

Chengdu Sports Center Stadium, Chengdu
Attendance: 550
Referee: Bentla D'Coth (India)
22 May 2010
19:30 UTC+08:00

Myanmar	0–2	North Korea
	Report (AFC); Report	Yun Song-mi 17'; Jo Yun-mi 84'

Chengdu Sports Center Stadium, Chengdu
Attendance: 360
Referee: Wang Jia (China PR)

24 May 2010
16:00 UTC+08:00

North Korea	1–2	Japan
Ra Un-sim 70'	Report (AFC); Report	Ando 4' (pen.); Nagasato 14'

Chengdu Sports Center Stadium, Chengdu
Attendance: 400
Referee: Hong Eun-ah (South Korea)
24 May 2010
16:00 UTC+08:00

Myanmar	0–2	Thailand
	Report (AFC); Report	Junpen 15'; Waranya 89'

Shuangliu Sports Centre Stadium, Chengdu
Attendance: 180
Referee: Wang Jia (China PR)

=== Group B ===
Team	Pld	W	D	L	GF	GA	GD	Pts
China (H)	3	2	1	0	6	0	+6	7
Australia	3	2	0	1	5	2	+3	6
South Korea	3	1	1	1	6	3	+3	4
Vietnam	3	0	0	3	0	12	−12	0

Source: RSSSF
(H) Hosts
19 May 2010
15:00 UTC+08:00

Australia	2–0	Vietnam
Khamis 29'; Ledbrook 51' (pen.)	Report (AFC); Report

Chengdu Sports Center Stadium, Chengdu
Attendance: 1,000
Referee: Ri Hyang-ok (North Korea)
19 May 2010
19:30 UTC+08:00

China	0–0	South Korea
	Report (AFC); Report

Chengdu Sports Center Stadium, Chengdu
Attendance: 15,000
Referee: Pannipar Kamnueng (Thailand)

21 May 2010
15:00 UTC+08:00

South Korea	1–3	Australia
Kang Sun-mi 71'	Report (AFC); Report	Carroll 52'; De Vanna 59'; Kerr 66'

Chengdu Sports Center Stadium, Chengdu
Attendance: 600
Referee: Sachiko Yamagishi (Japan)
21 May 2010
19:30 UTC+08:00

Vietnam	0–5	China
	Report (AFC); Report	Li Danyang 8'; Yuan Fan 12'; Zhang Rui 37'; Bi Yan 45+1' (pen.); Han Duan 51'

Shuangliu Sports Centre Stadium, Chengdu
Attendance: 8,500
Referee: Semaksuk Praew (Thailand)

23 May 2010
16:00 UTC+08:00

China	1–0	Australia
Zhang Rui 9'	Report (AFC); Report

Chengdu Sports Center Stadium, Chengdu
Attendance: 11,000
Referee: Sachiko Yamagishi (Japan)
23 May 2010
16:00 UTC+08:00

Vietnam	0–5	South Korea
	Report (AFC); Report	Yoo Young-a 20', 21', 66'; Cha Yun-hee 28'; Jung Seol-bin 36'

Shuangliu Sports Centre Stadium, Chengdu
Attendance: 1,000
Referee: Ri Hyang-ok (North Korea)

== Knockout stages ==
Semi-finals
27 May – Chengdu
Japan	0
Australia	1
27 May – Chengdu
China	0
North Korea (a.e.t.)	1

Final
30 May – Chengdu
Australia (p)	1 (5)
North Korea	1 (4)
Third place
30 May – Chengdu
Japan	2
China	0

=== Semi-finals ===
Winners qualified for 2011 FIFA Women's World Cup.

27 May 2010
16:00 UTC+08:00

Japan	0–1	Australia
	Report (AFC); Report	Gill 45+1'

Chengdu Sports Center Stadium, Chengdu
Attendance: 1,200
Referee: Pannipar Kamnueng (Thailand)
27 May 2010
19:30 UTC+08:00

China	0–1 (a.e.t.)	North Korea
	Report (AFC); Report	Kim Kyong-hwa 109'

Chengdu Sports Center Stadium, Chengdu
Attendance: 12,500
Referee: Semaksuk Praew (Thailand)

=== Third place match ===
Winner qualified for 2011 FIFA Women's World Cup.

30 May 2010
16:00 UTC+08:00

Japan	2–0	China
Ando 18'; Sawa 62'	Report (AFC); Report

Chengdu Sports Center Stadium, Chengdu
Attendance: 5,800
Referee: Hong Eun-ah (South Korea)

=== Final ===
30 May 2010
19:30 UTC+08:00

Australia	1–1 (a.e.t.)	North Korea
Kerr 19'	Report (AFC); Report	Jo Yun-mi 73'
Penalties
Shipard (penalty scored); Ledbrook (penalty scored); Gill (penalty scored); Garriock (penalty scored); Simon (penalty scored)	5–4	(penalty scored) Jo Yun-mi; (penalty missed) Yun Song-mi; (penalty scored) Choe Yong-sim; (penalty scored) Yu Jong-hui; (penalty scored) Mun Chol-mi

Chengdu Sports Center Stadium, Chengdu
Attendance: 1,200
Referee: Sachiko Yamagichi (Japan)

== Awards ==
AFC Women's Asian Cup 2010 winners

Australia
First title

Most Valuable Player	Top Scorer	Fairplay Award
(North Korea) Jo Yun-mi	(Japan) Kozue Ando (3 goals)	China

== Goalscorers ==
There were 45 goals scored in 16 matches, for an average of 2.81 goals per match.

3 goals

- (Japan) Homare Sawa
- (Japan) Kozue Ando
- (South Korea) Yoo Young-a
- (North Korea) Jo Yun-mi

2 goals

- (Australia) Sam Kerr
- (China) Zhang Rui
- (Japan) Mami Yamaguchi

1 goal

- (Australia) Kate Gill
- (Australia) Kim Carroll
- (Australia) Kylie Ledbrook
- (Australia) Leena Khamis
- (Australia) Lisa De Vanna
- (China) Bi Yan
- (China) Han Duan
- (China) Li Danyang
- (China) Yuan Fan
- (Japan) Aya Miyama
- (Japan) Aya Sameshima
- (Japan) Azusa Iwashimizu
- (Japan) Manami Nakano
- (Japan) Megumi Kamionobe
- (Japan) Megumi Takase
- (Japan) Rumi Utsugi
- (Japan) Yuki Nagasato
- (South Korea) Cha Yun-hee
- (South Korea) Jung Hae-in
- (South Korea) Kang Sun-mi
- (North Korea) Jon Myong-hwa
- (North Korea) Kim Kyong-hwa
- (North Korea) Kim Yong-ae
- (North Korea) Ra Un-sim
- (North Korea) Yun Song-mi
- (Thailand) Junpen Seesraum
- (Thailand) Waranya Chaikantree

== See also ==
- Women's association football
- Asian Football Confederation (AFC)
- AFC Women's Asian Cup
