= Guangzhou Higher Education Mega Center Stadium =

Sports stadium in Guangzhou, China

Coordinates: 23.057986°N 113.38617°E

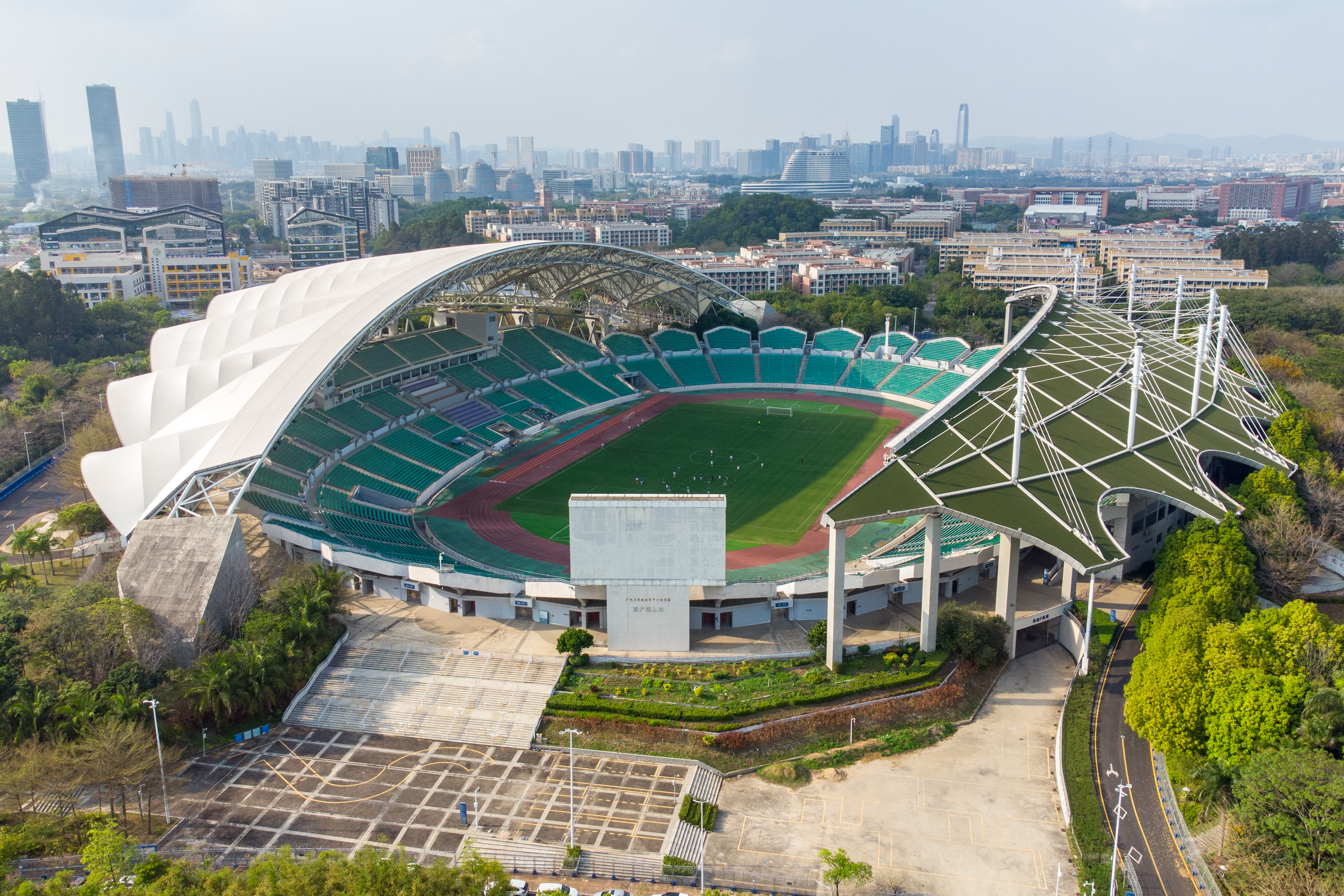
- Interactive map of Guangzhou Higher Education Mega Center Stadium
- Full name: Guangzhou Higher Education Mega Center Stadium
- Location: Guangzhou Higher Education Mega Center, Guangzhou, China
- Capacity: 39,346

Construction
- Architects: Kijo Rokkaku Architect & Associates

Tenant
- Guangzhou Rams

The Guangzhou Higher Education Mega Center Stadium (Chinese: 广州大学城体育场; pinyin: Guǎngzhōu dàxuéchéng tǐyùchǎng) is a stadium situated in the sports center area of the Guangzhou Higher Education Mega Center in Guangzhou, Guangdong, China. It is used mainly for association football, athletics, rugby union, and rugby sevens.

It held rugby and football events at the 2010 Asian Games. Starting from 2013, it also held the China Women's Sevens as part of the IRB Women's Sevens World Series. The stadium has a capacity of 39,346, making it the third largest stadium in Guangzhou, after Guangdong Olympic Stadium and Tianhe Stadium. The Guangzhou Rams rugby team sometimes uses the venue for their big games.

== See also ==
- Guangzhou Higher Education Mega Center
- Lists of stadiums
